= 1979 French Open – Men's doubles =

Men's doubles
- 1979 French Open

Final
- Champion: (United States) Gene Mayer (United States) Sandy Mayer
- Runner-up: (Australia) Ross Case (United States) Phil Dent
- Score: 6–4, 6–4, 6–4

Details
- Draw: 64
- Seeds: 16

Events
Singles	men	women		boys	girls
Doubles	men	women	mixed	boys	girls
WC Singles	men	women	quad
WC Doubles	men	women	quad
Legends	−45	45+	women
- French Open

Gene Mayer and Henry Pfister were the defending champions but only Gene Mayer competed that year.

Gene Mayer teamed up with his brother Sandy Mayer and successfully defended his title by defeating Ross Case and Phil Dent 6–4, 6–4, 6–4 in the final.

== Seeds ==
1. (Poland) Wojtek Fibak / (Netherlands) Tom Okker (second round)
2. (Czechoslovakia) Jan Kodeš / (Czechoslovakia) Tomáš Šmíd (semifinals)
3. (United States) Sandy Mayer / (United States) Gene Mayer (champions)
4. (United States) Brian Gottfried / (Mexico) Raúl Ramírez (quarterfinals)
5. (Paraguay) Víctor Pecci / (Hungary) Balázs Taróczy (withdrew)
6. (Switzerland) Heinz Günthardt / (South Africa) Bob Hewitt (third round)
7. (Romania) Ilie Năstase / (Romania) Ion Țiriac (second round)
8. (Australia) Mark Edmondson / (Australia) John Marks (first round)
9. (United States) Peter Fleming / (Australia) Kim Warwick (third round)
10. (Australia) Ross Case / (Australia) Phil Dent (final)
11. (United States) Arthur Ashe / (United States) Dick Stockton (semifinals)
12. (United States) Tim Gullikson / (United States) Tom Gullikson (third round)
13. (United States) Pat DuPré / (United States) Stan Smith (quarterfinals)
14. (Socialist Federal Republic of Yugoslavia) Željko Franulović / (Chile) Hans Gildemeister (second round)
15. (India) Anand Amritraj / (South Africa) Ray Moore (third round)
16. (United States) Bruce Manson / (Rhodesia) Andrew Pattison (quarterfinals)

== Draw ==
Key

- Q = Qualifier
- WC = Wild card
- LL = Lucky loser
- Alt = Alternate
- ITF = ITF entry
- PR = Protected ranking
- SR = Special ranking
- SE = Special exempt
- JE = Junior exempt
- JR = Junior Accelerator Programme entrant
- CO = College Accelerator Programme entrant
- NG = Next Gen Accelerator Program entrant
- w/o = Walkover
- r = Retired
- d = Defaulted

=== Finals ===
Quarterfinals
10	(Australia) Ross Case (Australia) Phil Dent	6	6
(Chile) Álvaro Fillol (Chile) Jaime Fillol	2	2
4	(United States) Brian Gottfried (Mexico) Raúl Ramírez	7	6^{r}
11	(United States) Arthur Ashe (United States) Dick Stockton	6	7
13	(United States) Pat DuPré (United States) Stan Smith	6	6
3	(United States) Sandy Mayer (United States) Gene Mayer	7	7
16	(United States) Bruce Manson (Rhodesia) Andrew Pattison	1	2
2	(Czechoslovakia) Jan Kodeš (Czechoslovakia) Tomáš Šmíd	6	6

Semifinals
10	(Australia) Ross Case (Australia) Phil Dent	6	3	4	6	6
11	(United States) Arthur Ashe (United States) Dick Stockton	4	6	6	3	4
3	(United States) Sandy Mayer (United States) Gene Mayer	7	5	6	7
2	(Czechoslovakia) Jan Kodeš (Czechoslovakia) Tomáš Šmíd	6	7	3	6

Final
10	(Australia) Ross Case (Australia) Phil Dent	4	4	4
3	(United States) Sandy Mayer (United States) Gene Mayer	6	6	6

=== Top half ===
==== Section 1 ====
First round
1	(Poland) W Fibak (Netherlands) T Okker	6	6
(Australia) S Myers (Australia) B Phillips-Moore	2	4
(United Kingdom) J Lloyd (Australia) P McNamara	w/o
(France) F Jauffret (France) Y Noah
(Spain) Á Giménez (United States) B Rowe	7	6	3
(Australia) D Carter (Australia) J James	6	7	6
(India) R Krishnan (India) B Nunna	4	2
10	(Australia) R Case (Australia) P Dent	6	6
15	(India) A Amritraj (South Africa) R Moore	6	6
(Brazil) N Keller (Brazil) C Motta	3	1
(Uruguay) D Pérez (Uruguay) H Roverano	2	4
(Brazil) R Guedes (Brazil) C Sacomandi	6	6
(Chile) Á Fillol (Chile) J Fillol	6	6
(Paraguay) F González (United States) E Teltscher	4	3
(Spain) M Farani (Chile) W Villanueva	0	1
7	(Romania) I Năstase (Romania) I Țiriac	6	6

Second round
1	(Poland) W Fibak (Netherlands) T Okker	6	5	5
(United Kingdom) J Lloyd (Australia) P McNamara	1	7	7
(Australia) D Carter (Australia) J James	6	5
10	(Australia) R Case (Australia) P Dent	7	7
15	(India) A Amritraj (South Africa) R Moore	6	6
(Brazil) R Guedes (Brazil) C Sacomandi	3	2
(Chile) Á Fillol (Chile) J Fillol	6	7
7	(Romania) I Năstase (Romania) I Țiriac	3	6

Third round
(United Kingdom) J Lloyd (Australia) P McNamara	1	3
10	(Australia) R Case (Australia) P Dent	6	6
15	(India) A Amritraj (South Africa) R Moore	6	6	9
(Chile) Á Fillol (Chile) J Fillol	2	7	11

Quarterfinals
10	(Australia) R Case (Australia) P Dent	6	6
(Chile) Á Fillol (Chile) J Fillol	2	2

==== Section 2 ====
First round
4	(United States) B Gottfried (Mexico) R Ramírez	6	5	6
(Italy) C Barazzutti (Argentina) R Cano	3	7	3
(Brazil) C Kirmayr (Ecuador) R Ycaza	2	0
(France) J-L Haillet (France) P Portes	6	6
(France) P Dominguez (France) G Moretton	6	6
(Brazil) E Botto (Brazil) P Penetta	1	0
(Uruguay) JL Damiani (Peru) F Maynetto	7	5	6
14	(Socialist Federal Republic of Yugoslavia) Ž Franulović (Chile) H Gildemeister	5	7	8
11	(United States) A Ashe (United States) D Stockton	6	6
(Argentina) E Álvarez (Spain) A Muñoz	3	2
(Romania) A Dîrzu (Romania) F Segărceanu	6	7
(France) R Brunet (France) J-B Chanfreau	1	5
(United States) D Ralston (Australia) F Stolle	3	2
(Australia) B Carmichael (United States) B Teacher	6	6
(United States) N Saviano (United States) B Scanlon	w/o
5	(Paraguay) V Pecci (Hungary) B Taróczy

Second round
4	(United States) B Gottfried (Mexico) R Ramírez	6	6
(France) J-L Haillet (France) P Portes	3	3
(France) P Dominguez (France) G Moretton	7	6
14	(Socialist Federal Republic of Yugoslavia) Ž Franulović (Chile) H Gildemeister	5	3
11	(United States) A Ashe (United States) D Stockton	6	6
(Romania) A Dîrzu (Romania) F Segărceanu	0	3
(Australia) B Carmichael (United States) B Teacher	6	6
(United States) N Saviano (United States) B Scanlon	1	4

Third round
4	(United States) B Gottfried (Mexico) R Ramírez	6	3	6
(France) P Dominguez (France) G Moretton	2	6	3
11	(United States) A Ashe (United States) D Stockton	6	6	6
(Australia) B Carmichael (United States) B Teacher	7	3	4

Quarterfinals
4	(United States) B Gottfried (Mexico) R Ramírez	7	6^{r}
11	(United States) A Ashe (United States) D Stockton	6	7

=== Bottom half ===
==== Section 3 ====
First round
6	(Switzerland) H Günthardt (South Africa) B Hewitt	3	7	8
(South Africa) D Joubert (New Zealand) R Simpson	6	6	6
(Colombia) A Cortes (Argentina) T Vázquez	3	7	2
(United States) W Maze (United States) F Taygan	6	6	6
(Czechoslovakia) I Lendl (Czechoslovakia) P Složil	2	4
(Italy) P Bertolucci (Italy) A Panatta	6	6
(Australia) N Jensen (Morocco) O Laimina	1	3
13	(United States) P DuPré (United States) S Smith	6	6
12	(United States) Tim Gullikson (United States) Tom Gullikson	7	6
(France) P Beust (France) B Paul	6	4
(United States) V Amaya (United States) E van Dillen	5	6	6
(Italy) G Ocleppo (France) C Roger-Vasselin	7	3	3
(France) A Jumatano (France) C Ros	0	4
(France) D Bedel (France) É Deblicker	6	6
(France) P Larfouillut (Monaco) E Van Der Pol	1	2
3	(United States) S Mayer (United States) G Mayer	6	6

Second round
6	(Switzerland) H Günthardt (South Africa) B Hewitt	3	7	8
(United States) W Maze (United States) F Taygan	6	6	6
(Italy) P Bertolucci (Italy) A Panatta	6	4
13	(United States) P DuPré (United States) S Smith	7	6
12	(United States) Tim Gullikson (United States) Tom Gullikson	6	5	11
(United States) V Amaya (United States) E van Dillen	2	7	9
(France) D Bedel (France) É Deblicker	2	1
3	(United States) S Mayer (United States) G Mayer	6	6

Third round
6	(Switzerland) H Günthardt (South Africa) B Hewitt	3	6	4
13	(United States) P DuPré (United States) S Smith	6	3	6
12	(United States) Tim Gullikson (United States) Tom Gullikson	3	5
3	(United States) S Mayer (United States) G Mayer	6	7

Quarterfinals
13	(United States) P DuPré (United States) S Smith	6	6
3	(United States) S Mayer (United States) G Mayer	7	7

==== Section 4 ====
First round
8	(United States) P Fleming (Australia) K Warwick	5	4
(Venezuela) J Andrew (Brazil) J Soares	7	6
(France) J-F Caujolle (France) C Freyss	6	3
(United States) R Fagel (United States) B Martin	7	6
(Czechoslovakia) J Granát (Netherlands) L Sanders	6	3	6
(Chile) J Ayala (Chile) JC Ayala	1	6	1
(United States) D Eddy (Socialist Federal Republic of Yugoslavia) M Ostoja	2	2
16	(United States) B Manson (Rhodesia) A Pattison	6	6
9	(Australia) M Edmondson (Australia) J Marks	6	6
(United States) H Hoyt (Socialist Federal Republic of Yugoslavia) N Špear	0	3
(United States) R Crawford (Mexico) E Montaño	6	3
(United States) J Kriek (United States) T Moor	7	6
(France) B Fritz (France) P Proisy	2	6	3
(Monaco) B Balleret (France) J Thamin	6	4	6
(United States) M Cahill (United States) V Winitsky	2	1
2	(Czechoslovakia) J Kodeš (Czechoslovakia) T Šmíd	6	6

Second round
(Venezuela) J Andrew (Brazil) J Soares	3	4
(United States) R Fagel (United States) B Martin	6	6
(Czechoslovakia) J Granát (Netherlands) L Sanders	3	6
16	(United States) B Manson (Rhodesia) A Pattison	6	7
9	(Australia) M Edmondson (Australia) J Marks	7	6
(United States) J Kriek (United States) T Moor	6	0
(Monaco) B Balleret (France) J Thamin	1	2
2	(Czechoslovakia) J Kodeš (Czechoslovakia) T Šmíd	6	6

Third round
(United States) R Fagel (United States) B Martin	3	7	3
16	(United States) B Manson (Rhodesia) A Pattison	6	5	6
9	(Australia) M Edmondson (Australia) J Marks	6	2
2	(Czechoslovakia) J Kodeš (Czechoslovakia) T Šmíd	7	6

Quarterfinals
16	(United States) B Manson (Rhodesia) A Pattison	1	2
2	(Czechoslovakia) J Kodeš (Czechoslovakia) T Šmíd	6	6
