= 1980 Congoleum Classic =

Former men's tennis tournament

- Date: February 11–16
- Edition: 7th
- Category: Grand Prix
- Prize money: $250,000
- Surface: Hard / outdoor
- Location: Rancho Mirage, CA, United States
- Venue: Mission Hills Country Club

Champions

Singles
- N/A

Doubles
- N/A: Both finals were cancelled due to rain.
← 1979 ·	Indian Wells Masters	· 1981 →

The 1980 Congoleum Classic was a men's tennis tournament played on outdoor hard courts. It was the 7th edition of the Indian Wells Masters and was part of the 1980 Volvo Grand Prix. It was played at the Mission Hills Country Club in Rancho Mirage, California in the United States and began on February 11, 1980.

== Events ==
=== Singles ===
The tournament was halted at the semifinal stage due to rain. The four semifinalists were Jimmy Connors, Brian Teacher, Peter Fleming and Gene Mayer and they shared the Finalists prize.

=== Doubles ===
Cancelled due to rain.
