= 1980 Congoleum Classic – Doubles =

Doubles
- 1980 Congoleum Classic

Final
- Score: No result due to rain.

Events
Singles	Doubles
← 1979 ·	Congoleum Classic	· 1981 →

Gene Mayer and Sandy Mayer were the defending champions and were one of sixteen teams in the second round.

There was no result for the tournament due to rain. Only the first round of matches were completed.

== Seeds ==
1. (United States) Marty Riessen / (United States) Sherwood Stewart (second round)
2. (United States) Gene Mayer / (United States) Sandy Mayer (second round)
3. (United States) Peter Fleming / (Czechoslovakia) Tomáš Šmíd (second round)
4. (United States) Robert Lutz / (United States) Stan Smith (second round)
5. (Poland) Wojciech Fibak / (United States) Brian Gottfried (first round)
6. n/a
7. (Australia) Peter McNamara / (Australia) Paul McNamee (second round)
8. (Romania) Ilie Năstase / (Romania) Ion Țiriac (first round)

== Draw ==
=== Key ===
- Q = Qualifier
- WC = Wild card
- LL = Lucky loser
- Alt = Alternate
- SE = Special exempt
- PR = Protected ranking
- ITF = ITF entry
- JE = Junior exempt
- w/o = Walkover
- r = Retired
- d = Defaulted
- SR = Special ranking

=== Final ===
Semifinals

Final

=== Top half ===
First round
1	(United States) M Riessen (United States) S Stewart	7	4	7
(United States) J Sadri (United States) T Wilkison	6	6	5
(United States) T Edlefsen (United States) M Machette	6	7
(United States) C B Strode (United States) M S Strode	4	6
(Australia) D Graham (United States) B Nichols	3	7	6
(United Kingdom) J Lloyd (United States) D Ralston	6	6	0
(United States) Tim Gullikson (United States) E van Dillen	7	6
8	(Romania) I Năstase (Romania) I Țiriac	6	3
3	(United States) P Fleming (Czechoslovakia) T Šmíd	6	7
(Australia) S Docherty (United States) J C Lewis	4	5
(South Africa) B Mitton (South Africa) R Moore	6	2	0
(Australia) G Masters (United States) T Moor	4	6	6
(United States) A Andrews (United States) M Wooldridge	7	3	2
(United States) T Gorman (United States) Tom Gullikson	5	6	6
(India) A Amritraj (United States) J Austin	6	5	6
5	(Poland) W Fibak (United States) B Gottfried	4	7	4

Second round
1	(United States) M Riessen (United States) S Stewart
(United States) T Edlefsen (United States) M Machette
(Australia) D Graham (United States) B Nichols
(United States) Tim Gullikson (United States) E van Dillen
3	(United States) P Fleming (Czechoslovakia) T Šmíd
(Australia) G Masters (United States) T Moor
(United States) T Gorman (United States) Tom Gullikson
(India) A Amritraj (United States) J Austin

Quarterfinals
(United States) (United States)
(United States)
(United States)

Semifinals
(United States)

=== Bottom half ===
First round
7	(Australia) P McNamara (Australia) P McNamee	6	7
(Australia) C Dibley (Australia) C Kachel	1	5
(United States) S Denton (India) S Menon	0	2
(France) P Dominguez (Czechoslovakia) I Lendl	6	6
(United States) V Amaya (United States) H Pfister	6	6
(Australia) R Frawley (Australia) C Letcher	3	2
(United States) B Martin (United States) E Teltscher	3	3
4	(United States) R Lutz (United States) S Smith	6	6
LL	(United States) G Malin (United States) V Van Patten	4	5
(United States) T Leonard (United States) J Van Linge	6	7
(Chile) J Fillol (United States) C Pasarell	5	4
(Southern Rhodesia) A Pattison (United States) N Saviano	7	6
(Australia) J Alexander (Australia) P Dent	6	6
(United States) F Taygan (United States) B Teacher	4	3
(United States) F Buehning (South Africa) J Kriek	2	3
2	(United States) G Mayer (United States) S Mayer	6	6

Second round
7	(Australia) P McNamara (Australia) P McNamee
(France) P Dominguez (Czechoslovakia) I Lendl
(United States) V Amaya (United States) H Pfister
4	(United States) R Lutz (United States) S Smith
(United States) T Leonard (United States) J Van Linge
(Southern Rhodesia) A Pattison (United States) N Saviano
(Australia) J Alexander (Australia) P Dent
2	(United States) G Mayer (United States) S Mayer

Quarterfinals
(United States) (United States)
(United States)

Semifinals
