= 1980 Congoleum Classic – Singles =

Singles
- 1980 Congoleum Classic

Final
- Score: No result due to rain.

Events
Singles	Doubles
← 1979 ·	Congoleum Classic	· 1981 →

Roscoe Tanner was the defending champion but lost in the first round to Johan Kriek.

There was no result for the tournament due to rain. The four semifinalists in the tournament were Jimmy Connors, Brian Teacher, Peter Fleming and Gene Mayer.

== Seeds ==
1. (United States) Jimmy Connors (semifinals)
2. (United States) Roscoe Tanner (first round)
3. n/a
4. (Argentina) Guillermo Vilas (quarterfinals)
5. (United States) Harold Solomon (quarterfinals)
6. (United States) Gene Mayer (semifinals)
7. (Poland) Wojciech Fibak (first round)
8. (United States) Peter Fleming (semifinals)
9. (United States) Brian Gottfried (second round)
10. (Australia) John Alexander (second round)
11. (United States) John Sadri (second round)
12. (United States) Eliot Teltscher (third round)
13. (Czechoslovakia) Ivan Lendl (third round)
14. (United States) Stan Smith (third round)
15. (United States) Tim Gullikson (first round)
16. (United States) Victor Amaya (third round)

== Draw ==
=== Key ===
- Q = Qualifier
- WC = Wild card
- LL = Lucky loser
- Alt = Alternate
- SE = Special exempt
- PR = Protected ranking
- ITF = ITF entry
- JE = Junior exempt
- w/o = Walkover
- r = Retired
- d = Defaulted
- SR = Special ranking

=== Finals ===
Semifinals
1	(United States) Jimmy Connors	No Result due to rain
(United States) Brian Teacher
8	(United States) Peter Fleming	No Result due to rain
6	(United States) Gene Mayer

Final
(United States)	No Final due to rain
(United States)

=== Top half ===
==== Section 1 ====
First round
1	(United States) J Connors	6	6
(United States) D Ralston	0	1
(Australia) G Masters	6	7
(Chile) J Fillol	3	6
(Australia) R Frawley	1	4
(United States) F Buehning	6	6
(United States) S Mayer	6	5	6
11	(United States) J Sadri	2	7	7
10	(Australia) J Alexander	6	7
Q	(South Africa) R Venter	1	6
(South Africa) B Bertram	6	7
Q	(United States) B Nichols	3	6
(Romania) I Nastase	4	6
(United States) E van Dillen	6	7
(United States) T Waltke	2	2
5	(United States) H Solomon	6	6

Second round
1	(United States) J Connors	6	6
(Australia) G Masters	2	2
(United States) F Buehning	2	6	6
11	(United States) J Sadri	6	4	3
10	(Australia) J Alexander	6	6	2
(South Africa) B Bertram	2	7	6
(United States) E van Dillen	2	3
5	(United States) H Solomon	6	6

Third round
1	(United States) J Connors	6	6
(United States) F Buehning	3	3
(South Africa) B Bertram	5	0
5	(United States) H Solomon	7	6

Quarterfinals
1	(United States) J Connors	7	6
5	(United States) H Solomon	5	2

==== Section 2 ====
First round
(United States) S Stewart	4	3
(United States) B Teacher	6	6
(Australia) P Dent	2	4
(United States) Tom Gullikson	6	6
Q	(United States) M Wooldridge	0	1
(United States) M Riessen	6	6
(Australia) C Dibley	7	6
15	(United States) Tim Gullikson	6	2
13	(Czechoslovakia) I Lendl	6	6
(Australia) P McNamee	3	3
(United States) V Van Patten	6	7
Q	(India) S Menon	3	5
(United States) B Walts	1	6
(India) V Amritraj	6	7
(Southern Rhodesia) A Pattison	7	6
7	(Poland) W Fibak	6	3

Second round
(United States) B Teacher	4	7	6
(United States) Tom Gullikson	6	6	3
(United States) M Riessen	6	7
(Australia) C Dibley	3	5
13	(Czechoslovakia) I Lendl	6	6
(United States) V Van Patten	0	3
(India) V Amritraj	2	1
(Southern Rhodesia) A Pattison	6	6

Third round
(United States) B Teacher	5	6	6
(United States) M Riessen	7	4	1
13	(Czechoslovakia) I Lendl	3	4
(Southern Rhodesia) A Pattison	6	6

Quarterfinals
(United States) B Teacher	6	6
(Southern Rhodesia) A Pattison	4	4

=== Bottom half ===
==== Section 3 ====
First round
8	(United States) P Fleming	7	3	6
(South Africa) B Mitton	6	6	4
(United States) F Taygan	5	7	4
(United States) J Austin	7	5	6
(United States) T Wilkison	4	6	6
Q	(Australia) S Docherty	6	2	3
Q	(United States) T Graham	1	4
12	(United States) E Teltscher	6	6
14	(United States) S Smith	6	6	6
(Australia) C Kachel	7	1	2
(Czechoslovakia) T Šmíd	6	6
(France) P Dominguez	2	1
(United States) B Scanlon	7	6
(United States) T Moor	5	3
(United States) R Lutz	6	2	6
4	(Argentina) G Vilas	2	6	7

Second round
8	(United States) P Fleming	2	6	7
(United States) J Austin	6	1	5
(United States) T Wilkison	6	1	3
12	(United States) E Teltscher	2	6	6
14	(United States) S Smith	6	6
(Czechoslovakia) T Šmíd	1	4
(United States) B Scanlon	6	3	4
4	(Argentina) G Vilas	4	6	6

Third round
8	(United States) P Fleming	6	6
12	(United States) E Teltscher	3	3
14	(United States) S Smith	4	4
4	(Argentina) G Vilas	6	6

Quarterfinals
8	(United States) P Fleming	6	6
4	(Argentina) G Vilas	1	4

==== Section 4 ====
First round
6	(United States) G Mayer	6	6
(United Kingdom) J Lloyd	2	1
(Australia) R Case	3	6	1^{r}
(United States) N Saviano	6	4	3
(United States) B Martin	3	3
(South Africa) R Moore	6	6
(United States) T Gorman	1	4
16	(United States) V Amaya	6	6
9	(United States) B Gottfried	6	6
(Sweden) J Norbäck	4	1
(Australia) P McNamara	1	4
(United States) H Pfister	6	6
Q	(United States) B Kleege	6	6
(United States) G Hardie	7	7
(South Africa) J Kriek	6	6	6
2	(United States) R Tanner	4	7	0

Second round
6	(United States) G Mayer	6	6
(United States) N Saviano	4	3
(South Africa) R Moore	4	3
16	(United States) V Amaya	6	6
9	(United States) B Gottfried	6	7	5
(United States) H Pfister	7	5	7
(United States) G Hardie	6	6	7
(South Africa) J Kriek	2	7	5

Third round
6	(United States) G Mayer	3	6	6
16	(United States) V Amaya	6	1	4
(United States) H Pfister	6	6
(United States) G Hardie	3	3

Quarterfinals
6	(United States) G Mayer	6	6
(United States) H Pfister	4	2
