= 1979 Congoleum Classic – Singles =

Singles
- 1979 Congoleum Classic

Final
- Champion: (United States) Roscoe Tanner
- Runner-up: (United States) Brian Gottfried
- Score: 6–4, 6–2

Details
- Draw: 64
- Seeds: 16

Events
Singles	Doubles
← 1978 ·	Congoleum Classic	· 1980 →

Roscoe Tanner was the defending champion and won in the final 6–4, 6–2 against Brian Gottfried.

== Seeds ==
1. (United States) Jimmy Connors (quarterfinals)
2. (Sweden) Björn Borg (first round)
3. (United States) John McEnroe (second round)
4. (United States) Harold Solomon (semifinals)
5. (United States) Brian Gottfried (final)
6. (Mexico) Raúl Ramirez (first round)
7. n/a
8. (United States) Roscoe Tanner (champion)
9. (United States) Sandy Mayer (second round)
10. (Spain) José Higueras (third round)
11. (United States) Tim Gullikson (first round)
12. (Poland) Wojciech Fibak (quarterfinals)
13. (Italy) Adriano Panatta (first round)
14. (United States) Dick Stockton (third round)
15. (United States) Stan Smith (second round)
16. n/a

== Draw ==
=== Key ===
- Q = Qualifier
- WC = Wild card
- LL = Lucky loser
- Alt = Alternate
- SE = Special exempt
- PR = Protected ranking
- ITF = ITF entry
- JE = Junior exempt
- w/o = Walkover
- r = Retired
- d = Defaulted
- SR = Special ranking

=== Finals ===
Semifinals
8	(United States) Roscoe Tanner	6	6
(United States) Eliot Teltscher	3	3
4	(United States) Harold Solomon	6	5	2
5	(United States) Brian Gottfried	1	7	6

Final
8	(United States) Roscoe Tanner	6	6
5	(United States) Brian Gottfried	4	2

=== Top half ===
==== Section 1 ====
First round
1	(United States) J Connors	6	7
(Czechoslovakia) V Zednik	2	5
(South Africa) D Schneider	5	3
(Switzerland) H Günthardt	7	6
(United States) V Amaya	6	6
(United States) S Stewart	4	1
(South Africa) R Moore	7	6
11	(United States) Tim Gullikson	5	3
(United States) J Borowiak	2	2
(United States) G Mayer	6	6
(United States) J Sadri	6	6	6
Q	(United States) B Walts	7	3	4
(United States) T Wilkison	4	1
(South Africa) C Drysdale	6	6
(United States) B Teacher	3	7	3
8	(United States) R Tanner	6	5	6

Second round
1	(United States) J Connors	6	6
(Switzerland) H Günthardt	0	4
(United States) V Amaya	6	6
(South Africa) R Moore	1	2
(United States) G Mayer	6	6
(United States) J Sadri	1	2
(South Africa) C Drysdale	7	5	5
8	(United States) R Tanner	5	7	7

Third round
1	(United States) J Connors	6	6
(United States) V Amaya	0	4
(United States) G Mayer	6	4	3
8	(United States) R Tanner	4	6	6

Quarterfinals
1	(United States) J Connors	6	3	6
8	(United States) R Tanner	4	6	7

==== Section 2 ====
First round
3	(United States) J McEnroe	6	6
(United States) Tom Gullikson	4	3
(United States) E Teltscher	6	7
(United States) H Pfister	3	6
(Brazil) C Kirmayr	3	1
(United States) R Lutz	6	6
(Chile) A Fillol	7	6
13	(Italy) A Panatta	6	3
9	(United States) S Mayer	7	3	7
(United Kingdom) J Lloyd	5	6	5
(United States) T Leonard	3	2
(Australia) C Dibley	6	6
(United States) T Gorman	6	6
(United States) M Cahill	2	4
(United States) N Saviano	7	7
6	(Mexico) R Ramirez	6	5

Second round
3	(United States) J McEnroe	7	5	6
(United States) E Teltscher	6	7	7
(United States) R Lutz	6	6
(Chile) A Fillol	0	3
9	(United States) S Mayer	7	4	3
(Australia) C Dibley	6	6	6
(United States) T Gorman	6	1	6
(United States) N Saviano	4	6	7

Third round
(United States) E Teltscher	6	7
(United States) R Lutz	2	6
(Australia) C Dibley	6	6
(United States) N Saviano	3	3

Quarterfinals
(United States) E Teltscher	6	7
(Australia) C Dibley	2	6

=== Bottom half ===
==== Section 3 ====
First round
LL	(Sweden) J Norbäck	3	1
Q	(United States) B Martin	6	6
Q	(United States) M Mitchell	6	7
Q	(United States) E van Dillen	2	5
(Switzerland) C Dowdeswell	2	6	7
(Austria) P Feigl	6	4	5
(Paraguay) F González	6	4	3
12	(Poland) W Fibak	2	6	6
14	(United States) D Stockton	6	6	6
Q	(United States) J C Lewis	7	3	3
(Australia) R Case	0	2
(United States) P DuPré	6	6
(South Africa) B Mitton	5	3
(Australia) P McNamara	7	6
Q	(United States) G Hardie	6	3	3
4	(United States) H Solomon	3	6	6

Second round
Q	(United States) B Martin	6	6
Q	(United States) M Mitchell	2	1
(Switzerland) C Dowdeswell	4	4
12	(Poland) W Fibak	6	6
14	(United States) D Stockton	7	6
(United States) P DuPré	6	4
(Australia) P McNamara	2	2
4	(United States) H Solomon	6	6

Third round
Q	(United States) B Martin	1	6
12	(Poland) W Fibak	6	7
14	(United States) D Stockton	2	4
4	(United States) H Solomon	6	6

Quarterfinals
12	(Poland) W Fibak	3	4
4	(United States) H Solomon	6	6

==== Section 4 ====
First round
5	(United States) B Gottfried	6	6
(Argentina) L Álvarez	3	1
(United States) T Moor	6	4	7
(Australia) P Dent	3	6	6
Q	(Australia) B Carmichael	6	6
(Venezuela) J Andrew	3	2
(United States) M Riessen	4	2
10	(Spain) J Higueras	6	6
15	(United States) S Smith	5	7	6
Q	(United States) D Bohrnstedt	7	6	1
(Spain) Á Giménez	7	3	2
(Netherlands) T Okker	5	6	6
(Chile) J Fillol	6	7
(United States) C Pasarell	3	6
(United States) B Manson	6	7	6
2	(Sweden) B Borg	7	5	2

Second round
5	(United States) B Gottfried	6	6
(United States) T Moor	3	2
Q	(Australia) B Carmichael	6	1
10	(Spain) J Higueras	7	6
15	(United States) S Smith	6	1	4
(Netherlands) T Okker	4	6	6
(Chile) J Fillol	3	7	3
(United States) B Manson	6	5	6

Third round
5	(United States) B Gottfried	4	6	6
10	(Spain) J Higueras	6	3	2
(Netherlands) T Okker	6	5	6
(United States) B Manson	4	7	4

Quarterfinals
5	(United States) B Gottfried	6	6
(Netherlands) T Okker	2	0
