= 1979 French Open – Mixed doubles =

Mixed doubles
- 1979 French Open

Final
- Champion: (South Africa) Bob Hewitt (Australia) Wendy Turnbull
- Runner-up: (Romania) Ion Țiriac (Romania) Virginia Ruzici
- Score: 6–3, 2–6, 6–1

Details
- Draw: 28
- Seeds: 8

Events
Singles	men	women		boys	girls
Doubles	men	women	mixed	boys	girls
WC Singles	men	women	quad
WC Doubles	men	women	quad
Legends	−45	45+	women
- French Open

Pavel Složil and Renáta Tomanová were the defending champions but lost in the semifinals to Bob Hewitt and Wendy Turnbull.

Bob Hewitt and Wendy Turnbull won in the final 6–3, 2–6, 6–1 against Ion Țiriac and Virginia Ruzici.

== Seeds ==
1. (Romania) Ilie Năstase / (France) Françoise Dürr (quarterfinals)
2. (South Africa) Bob Hewitt / (Australia) Wendy Turnbull (champions)
3. (Czechoslovakia) Pavel Složil / (Czechoslovakia) Renáta Tomanová (semifinals)
4. (Czechoslovakia) Ivan Lendl / (Czechoslovakia) Regina Maršíková (quarterfinals)
5. (Romania) Ion Țiriac / (Romania) Virginia Ruzici (final)
6. (France) Éric Deblicker / (France) Gail Lovera (quarterfinals)
7. (France) Patrice Beust / (Netherlands) Betty Stöve (semifinals)
8. (Paraguay) Francisco González / (United States) Anne Smith (quarterfinals)

== Draw ==
Key

- Q = Qualifier
- WC = Wild card
- LL = Lucky loser
- Alt = Alternate
- ITF = ITF entry
- PR = Protected ranking
- SR = Special ranking
- SE = Special exempt
- JE = Junior exempt
- JR = Junior Accelerator Programme entrant
- CO = College Accelerator Programme entrant
- NG = Next Gen Accelerator Program entrant
- w/o = Walkover
- r = Retired
- d = Defaulted

=== Finals ===
Semifinals
5	(Romania) Ion Țiriac (Romania) Virginia Ruzici	2	6	6
7	(France) Patrice Beust (Netherlands) Betty Stöve	6	3	0
3	(Czechoslovakia) Pavel Složil (Czechoslovakia) Renáta Tomanová	2	0
2	(South Africa) Bob Hewitt (Australia) Wendy Turnbull	6	6

Final
5	(Romania) Ion Țiriac (Romania) Virginia Ruzici	3	6	1
2	(South Africa) Bob Hewitt (Australia) Wendy Turnbull	6	2	6

=== Top half ===
First round
1	(Romania) I Năstase (France) F Dürr	6	6
(Brazil) C Sacomandi (Brazil) C Monteiro	2	0
(France) B Renoult (France) A Chevalier
(United States) P DuPré (United States) D DuPré	w/o
(Brazil) E Botto (Argentina) M Voyame	1	3
(France) C Ros (France) A-M Cassaigne	6	6
4	(Czechoslovakia) I Lendl (Czechoslovakia) R Maršíková	5	6	6
(United States) V Winitsky (United States) R Fox	7	3	1
(France) J-B Chanfreau (United States) M Redondo	7	6
(Morocco) O Laimina (France) D Beillan	6	3
(France) J Lovera (France) R Darmon	6	5
(France) P Joly (Italy) A-M Nasuelli	7	7
(Colombia) A Cortes (United States) P Bostrom	5	4
7	(France) P Beust (Netherlands) B Stöve	7	6

Second round
1	(Romania) I Năstase (France) F Dürr	6	6
(United States) P DuPré (United States) D DuPré	2	0
(France) C Ros (France) A-M Cassaigne	2	1
5	(Romania) I Țiriac (Romania) V Ruzici	6	6
4	(Czechoslovakia) I Lendl (Czechoslovakia) R Maršíková	6	6
(France) J-B Chanfreau (United States) M Redondo	1	3
(France) P Joly (Italy) A-M Nasuelli	1	1
7	(France) P Beust (Netherlands) B Stöve	6	6

Quarterfinals
1	(Romania) I Năstase (France) F Dürr	4	6	3
5	(Romania) I Țiriac (Romania) V Ruzici	6	1	6
4	(Czechoslovakia) I Lendl (Czechoslovakia) R Maršíková	3	5
7	(France) P Beust (Netherlands) B Stöve	6	7

Semifinals
5	(Romania) I Țiriac (Romania) V Ruzici	2	6	6
7	(France) P Beust (Netherlands) B Stöve	6	3	0

=== Bottom half ===
First round
6	(France) É Deblicker (France) G Lovera	6	6
(France) J Ravel (United States) M Riley	1	2
(Brazil) N Keller (Brazil) P Medrado	6	6
(Brazil) R Guedes (Chile) S Urroz	0	3
(Socialist Federal Republic of Yugoslavia) M Ostoja (Socialist Federal Republic of Yugoslavia) M Jaušovec	7	3	4
3	(Czechoslovakia) P Složil (Czechoslovakia) R Tomanová	5	6	6
8	(Paraguay) F González (United States) A Smith	6	6
(United States) T Bennett (United States) P Teeguarden	1	1
(France) J Thamin (France) N Fuchs	6	6
(Chile) JC Ayala (Chile) V Zahri	1	3

Second round
6	(France) É Deblicker (France) G Lovera	6	7
(United States) L Turville (United States) L duPont	3	6
(Brazil) N Keller (Brazil) P Medrado	1	3
3	(Czechoslovakia) P Složil (Czechoslovakia) R Tomanová	6	6
8	(Paraguay) F González (United States) A Smith	w/o
(Venezuela) J Andrew (United States) S Acker
(France) J Thamin (France) N Fuchs	4	1
2	(South Africa) B Hewitt (Australia) W Turnbull	6	6

Quarterfinals
6	(France) É Deblicker (France) G Lovera	6	3
3	(Czechoslovakia) P Složil (Czechoslovakia) R Tomanová	7	6
8	(Paraguay) F González (United States) A Smith	2	4
2	(South Africa) B Hewitt (Australia) W Turnbull	6	6

Semifinals
3	(Czechoslovakia) P Složil (Czechoslovakia) R Tomanová	2	0
2	(South Africa) B Hewitt (Australia) W Turnbull	6	6
