= 1979 Congoleum Classic =

- Date: February 12–18
- Edition: 6th
- Category: Grand Prix
- Draw: 64S / 32D
- Prize money: $250,000
- Surface: Hard / outdoor
- Location: Rancho Mirage, CA, United States
- Venue: Mission Hills Country Club

Champions

Singles
- (United States) Roscoe Tanner

Doubles
- (United States) Gene Mayer / (United States) Sandy Mayer
- Indian Wells Masters

The 1979 Congoleum Classic, also known as the Volvo Tennis Games, was a men's tennis tournament played on outdoor hard courts. It was the 6th edition of the Indian Wells Masters and was part of the 1979 Colgate-Palmolive Grand Prix. It was played at the Mission Hills Country Club in Rancho Mirage, California in the United States and was held from February 12 through February 18, 1979. Eighth-seeded Roscoe Tanner won his second consecutive singles title at the event and earned $35,000 first-prize money.

== Finals ==
=== Singles ===
(United States) Roscoe Tanner defeated (United States) Brian Gottfried 6–4, 6–2

- It was Tanner's 1st title of the year and the 26th of his career.

=== Doubles ===
(United States) Gene Mayer / (United States) Sandy Mayer defeated (South Africa) Cliff Drysdale / (United States) Bruce Manson 6–4, 7–6

- It was Gene Mayer's 1st title of the year and the 8th of his career. It was Sandy Mayer's 1st title of the year and the 20th of his career.
