= Hubertus Hoyt =

American business executive and tennis player

- Country (sports): United States
- Born: November 3, 1955 (age 70) Newburgh, New York
- Height: 5 ft 10 in (178 cm)
- Plays: Right-handed

Singles
- Career record: 3–18
- Highest ranking: No. 195 (July 12, 1978)

Grand Slam singles results
- French Open: 1R (1979)
- Wimbledon: Q1 (1980)

Doubles
- Career record: 5–31

Grand Slam doubles results
- French Open: 1R (1977, 1979)
- US Open: 1R (1976, 1977)

Hubertus Hoyt (born November 3, 1955), also known as Bert Hoyt, is an American business executive and former professional tennis player. He has held executive roles at Puma and Nike.

Hoyt is a native of Newburgh, New York and was active on the professional tennis tour in the late 1970s and early 1980s, reaching a best world ranking of 195. He featured in the singles main draw of the 1979 French Open.
