= 1979 Congoleum Classic – Doubles =

Doubles
- 1979 Congoleum Classic

Final
- Champions: (United States) Gene Mayer (United States) Sandy Mayer
- Runners-up: (South Africa) Cliff Drysdale (United States) Bruce Manson
- Score: 6–4, 7–6

Details
- Draw: 32
- Seeds: 8

Events
| Singles | Doubles |
- Congoleum Classic

Raymond Moore and Roscoe Tanner were the defending champions but lost in the second round to David Graham and John Sadri.

Gene Mayer and Sandy Mayer won in the final 6–4, 7–6 against Cliff Drysdale and Bruce Manson.

== Seeds ==
1. (Poland) Wojciech Fibak / (Netherlands) Tom Okker (second round)
2. (United States) Robert Lutz / (United States) Stan Smith (semifinals)
3. (South Africa) Frew McMillan / (United States) Dick Stockton (second round)
4. (United States) Marty Riessen / (United States) Sherwood Stewart (semifinals)
5. (United States) Brian Gottfried / (Mexico) Raúl Ramirez (quarterfinals)
6. (South Africa) Raymond Moore / (United States) Roscoe Tanner (second round)
7. (United States) Gene Mayer / (United States) Sandy Mayer (champions)
8. (Australia) Syd Ball / (Australia) Ross Case (first round)

== Draw ==
Key

- Q = Qualifier
- WC = Wild card
- LL = Lucky loser
- Alt = Alternate
- ITF = ITF entry
- PR = Protected ranking
- SR = Special ranking
- SE = Special exempt
- JE = Junior exempt
- JR = Junior Accelerator Programme entrant
- CO = College Accelerator Programme entrant
- NG = Next Gen Accelerator Program entrant
- w/o = Walkover
- r = Retired
- d = Defaulted

=== Final ===
Semifinals
7 | (United States) Gene Mayer (United States) Sandy Mayer | 6 | 3 | 6
4 | (United States) Marty Riessen (United States) Sherwood Stewart | 1 | 6 | 1
(South Africa) Cliff Drysdale (United States) Bruce Manson | 7 | 6
2 | (United States) Robert Lutz (United States) Stan Smith | 6 | 3

Final
7 | (United States) Gene Mayer (United States) Sandy Mayer | 6 | 7
(South Africa) Cliff Drysdale (United States) Bruce Manson | 4 | 6

=== Top half ===
First round
1 | (Poland) W Fibak (Netherlands) T Okker | 6 | 6
(Spain) Á Giménez (Spain) J Higueras | 1 | 2
(Australia) P Dent (Australia) C Dibley | 7 | 7
(United States) B Teacher (United States) T Wilkison | 6 | 6
(United States) T Leonard (United States) J Van Linge | 6 | 3 | 6
(Venezuela) J Andrew (Brazil) C Kirmayr | 4 | 6 | 7
(United States) J C Lewis (United States) A Lucchesi | 5 | 3
7 | (United States) G Mayer (United States) S Mayer | 7 | 6
4 | (United States) M Riessen (United States) S Stewart | 6 | 6
(Austria) P Feigl (United States) E Teltscher | 2 | 3
(United States) V Amaya (United States) B Walts | 6 | 6
(Australia) B Carmichael (United States) G Hardie | 3 | 2
(Australia) D Graham (United States) J Sadri | 4 | 7 | 7
(United States) D Bohrnstedt (United States) M Machette | 6 | 6 | 6
(South Africa) B Mitton (South Africa) D Schneider | 3 | 6
6 | (South Africa) R Moore (United States) R Tanner | 6 | 7

Second round
1 | (Poland) W Fibak (Netherlands) T Okker | 6 | 3
(Australia) P Dent (Australia) C Dibley | 7 | 6
(Venezuela) J Andrew (Brazil) C Kirmayr | 3 | 0
7 | (United States) G Mayer (United States) S Mayer | 6 | 6
4 | (United States) M Riessen (United States) S Stewart | 7 | 7
(United States) V Amaya (United States) B Walts | 5 | 5
(Australia) D Graham (United States) J Sadri | 4 | 6 | 6
6 | (South Africa) R Moore (United States) R Tanner | 6 | 3 | 4

Quarterfinals
(Australia) P Dent (Australia) C Dibley | 6 | 6 | 0
7 | (United States) G Mayer (United States) S Mayer | 4 | 7 | 6
4 | (United States) M Riessen (United States) S Stewart | 6 | 6 | 6
(Australia) D Graham (United States) J Sadri | 7 | 3 | 4

Semifinals
7 | (United States) G Mayer (United States) S Mayer | 6 | 3 | 6
4 | (United States) M Riessen (United States) S Stewart | 1 | 6 | 1

=== Bottom half ===
First round
8 | (Australia) S Ball (Australia) R Case | 2 | 5
(South Africa) C Drysdale (United States) B Manson | 6 | 7
(Switzerland) C Dowdeswell (Switzerland) H Günthardt | 6 | 6
(United States) P Kelly (United States) L Shapiro | 1 | 1
(United States) Tim Gullikson (United States) Tom Gullikson | 6 | 6
(United States) M Mitchell (United States) P Rennert | 4 | 0
(Chile) A Fillol (Chile) J Fillol | 3 | 5
3 | (South Africa) F McMillan (United States) D Stockton | 6 | 7
5 | (United States) B Gottfried (Mexico) R Ramirez | 6 | 6
(United States) P Pearson (United States) C Stansbury | 3 | 3
(Australia) D Cahill (United States) T Moor | 6 | 3
(United States) H Pfister (United States) B Rowe | 7 | 6
(United States) P DuPré (United States) T Gorman | 7 | 6 | 7
(United Kingdom) J Lloyd (United States) C Pasarell | 5 | 7 | 5
(Sweden) G Bergstrand (Sweden) J Norbäck | 4 | 1
2 | (United States) R Lutz (United States) S Smith | 6 | 6

Second round
(South Africa) C Drysdale (United States) B Manson | 7 | 4 | 6
(Switzerland) C Dowdeswell (Switzerland) H Günthardt | 6 | 6 | 4
(United States) Tim Gullikson (United States) Tom Gullikson | 6 | 2 | 7
3 | (South Africa) F McMillan (United States) D Stockton | 4 | 6 | 6
5 | (United States) B Gottfried (Mexico) R Ramirez
(United States) H Pfister (United States) B Rowe | w/o
(United States) P DuPré (United States) T Gorman | 6 | 5 | 3
2 | (United States) R Lutz (United States) S Smith | 3 | 7 | 6

Quarterfinals
(South Africa) C Drysdale (United States) B Manson | 4 | 6 | 6
(United States) Tim Gullikson (United States) Tom Gullikson | 6 | 4 | 3
(United States) H Pfister (United States) B Rowe | 6 | 6 | 2
2 | (United States) R Lutz (United States) S Smith | 4 | 7 | 6

Semifinals
(South Africa) C Drysdale (United States) B Manson | 7 | 6
2 | (United States) R Lutz (United States) S Smith | 6 | 3
