= Roger Guedes =

Brazilian tennis player (born 1953)

- Full name: Roger de Santis Guedes
- Country (sports): Brazil
- Born: 3 November 1953 (age 72) Bauru, Brazil
- Height: 181 cm (5 ft 11 in)
- Plays: Right-handed

Singles
- Career record: 5–16
- Career titles: 0
- Highest ranking: No. 89 (13 Aug 1979)

Grand Slam singles results
- French Open: 2R (1979)
- Wimbledon: 1R (1979)
- US Open: 1R (1977)

Doubles
- Career record: 4–14
- Career titles: 0
- Highest ranking: No. 379 (28 Jan 1985)

Grand Slam doubles results
- French Open: 2R (1979)

Grand Slam mixed doubles results
- French Open: 1R (1979)

Roger de Santis Guedes (born 3 November 1953) is a Brazilian former professional tennis player.

Guedes, born and raised in Bauru, was a junior Banana Bowl champion and attended Hampton Institute on a full scholarship. In 1976, he played in the NCAA Division II championship-winning team and also partnered with Bruce Foxworth to win the doubles championship.

On the professional tour, Guedes had a career high ranking of 89 in the world and, despite being one of the Brazil's top players, never received a Davis Cup call up. He won a first round match at the 1979 French Open and also made main draw appearance at Wimbledon and the US Open. His best performance on the Grand Prix circuit was a quarter-final appearance at Bogota in 1979, with wins over João Soares and Álvaro Betancur.
