= 1979 French Open – Men's singles =

Men's singles
- 1979 French Open

Final
- Champion: (Sweden) Björn Borg
- Runner-up: (Paraguay) Víctor Pecci
- Score: 6–3, 6–1, 6–7^{(6–8)}, 6–4

Details
- Draw: 128
- Seeds: 16

Events
Singles	men	women		boys	girls
Doubles	men	women	mixed	boys	girls
WC Singles	men	women	quad
WC Doubles	men	women	quad
Legends	−45	45+	women
- French Open

Defending champion Björn Borg defeated Víctor Pecci in the final, 6–3, 6–1, 6–7^{(6–8)}, 6–4 to win the men's singles tennis title at the 1979 French Open. It was his fourth French Open title and seventh major title overall.

== Seeds ==
The seeded players are listed below. Björn Borg is the champion; others show the round in which they were eliminated.

1. (Sweden) Björn Borg (champion)
2. (United States) Jimmy Connors (semifinals)
3. (Argentina) Guillermo Vilas (quarterfinals)
4. (United States) Vitas Gerulaitis (semifinals)
5. n/a
6. (United States) Harold Solomon (fourth round)
7. (United States) Eddie Dibbs (quarterfinals)
8. (Spain) José Higueras (quarterfinals)
9. (United States) Arthur Ashe (third round)
10. (United States) Brian Gottfried (third round)
11. (Argentina) José Luis Clerc (second round)
12. (Poland) Wojtek Fibak (fourth round)
13. (Spain) Manuel Orantes (fourth round)
14. (United States) Tim Gullikson (fourth round)
15. (Italy) Corrado Barazzutti (third round)
16. (Italy) Adriano Panatta (third round)

== Draw ==
Key

- Q = Qualifier
- WC = Wild card
- LL = Lucky loser
- Alt = Alternate
- ITF = ITF entry
- PR = Protected ranking
- SR = Special ranking
- SE = Special exempt
- JE = Junior exempt
- JR = Junior Accelerator Programme entrant
- CO = College Accelerator Programme entrant
- NG = Next Gen Accelerator Program entrant
- w/o = Walkover
- r = Retired
- d = Defaulted

=== Finals ===
Quarterfinals
1	(Sweden) Björn Borg	6	6	7
(Chile) Hans Gildemeister	4	1	5
4	(United States) Vitas Gerulaitis	6	3	6	6
8	(Spain) José Higueras	1	6	4	4
(Paraguay) Víctor Pecci	6	6	7
3	(Argentina) Guillermo Vilas	0	2	5
7	(United States) Eddie Dibbs	2	6	4	2
2	(United States) Jimmy Connors	6	2	6	6

Semifinals
1	(Sweden) Björn Borg	6	6	6
4	(United States) Vitas Gerulaitis	2	1	0
(Paraguay) Víctor Pecci	7	6	5	6
2	(United States) Jimmy Connors	5	4	7	3

Final
1	(Sweden) Björn Borg	6	6	6^{6}	6
(Paraguay) Víctor Pecci	3	1	7^{8}	4

=== Top half ===
==== Section 1 ====
First round
1	(Sweden) B Borg	6	5	6	6
(Czechoslovakia) T Šmid	1	7	4	4
(United States) T Gullikson	5	7	6	6
Q	(France) H Gauvain	7	5	4	2
(India) A Amritraj	3	5	3
(South Africa) R Moore	6	7	6
(West Germany) W Zirngibl	7	6	0	6
(United States) V Winitsky	5	2	6	3
(Paraguay) F González	6	7	7
(Socialist Federal Republic of Yugoslavia) N Špear	2	6	6
Q	(Uruguay) J L Damiani	6	3	3	6
Q	(Czechoslovakia) J Granát	4	6	6	7
(France) G Moretton	3	6	7	6
(West Germany) P Elter	6	1	6	2
(United States) D Stockton	7	3	6	2	3
11	(Argentina) J L Clerc	5	6	3	6	6

Second round
1	(Sweden) B Borg	6	7	5	6
(United States) T Gullikson	3	6	7	4
(South Africa) R Moore	6	6	4	6
(West Germany) W Zirngibl	3	4	6	3
(Paraguay) F González	6	4	3	4
Q	(Czechoslovakia) J Granát	2	6	6	6
(France) G Moretton	6	6	6
11	(Argentina) J L Clerc	4	2	3

Third round
1	(Sweden) B Borg	6	6	6
(South Africa) R Moore	3	1	0
Q	(Czechoslovakia) J Granát	6	6	6	4
(France) G Moretton	2	7	7	6

Fourth round
1	(Sweden) B Borg	7	6	6
(France) G Moretton	5	4	2

==== Section 2 ====
First round
14	(United States) T Gullikson	6	6	6
(Venezuela) J Andrew	4	3	1
(United States) J Borowiak	6	3	2	6	6
(Austria) H Kary	4	6	6	2	3
Q	(Sweden) J Norbäck	4	6	5
(United States) V Amaya	6	7	7
(South Africa) J Kriek	6	0	6	3
(Czechoslovakia) P Huťka	7	6	3	6
(Chile) H Gildemeister	6	6	7
(United States) H Pfister	4	4	6
(United States) R Fagel	4	3	2
(United States) B Scanlon	6	6	6
(Australia) P McNamara	3	6	1	6	3
(Netherlands) L Sanders	6	2	6	3	6
(Rhodesia) A Pattison	6	6	3	6
LL	(Mexico) E Montaño	2	4	6	2

Second round
14	(United States) T Gullikson	6	6	7	6	6
(United States) J Borowiak	3	7	6	7	2
(United States) V Amaya	6	7	7
(Czechoslovakia) P Huťka	3	6	5
(Chile) H Gildemeister	6	6	6
(United States) B Scanlon	3	4	4
(Netherlands) L Sanders	7	6	7	6
(Rhodesia) A Pattison	6	7	6	2

Third round
14	(United States) T Gullikson	6	6	6	6
(United States) V Amaya	7	3	1	4
(Chile) H Gildemeister	6	6	6
(Netherlands) L Sanders	3	2	3

Fourth round
14	(United States) T Gullikson	7	3	6	1	3
(Chile) H Gildemeister	6	6	4	6	6

==== Section 3 ====
First round
4	(United States) V Gerulaitis	2	2	6	6	6
(United States) B Walts	6	6	3	2	2
Q	(United States) B Rowe	2	6	6	6
(Australia) P Kronk	6	3	4	1
(United States) S Mayer	7	6	6
(Mexico) R Ramírez	6	4	0
(Spain) A Muñoz	4	4	6
(United States) P DuPré	6	6	7
(France) P Proisy	4	4	7	6
(France) P Dominguez	6	6	6	7
(Czechoslovakia) I Lendl	7	6	4	6
(Chile) J Fillol Sr.	6	3	6	3
(Colombia) I Molina	6	6	1	3
(New Zealand) C Lewis	7	2	6	6
(Spain) J Soler	4	2	3
9	(United States) A Ashe	6	6	6

Second round
4	(United States) V Gerulaitis	6	6	6
Q	(United States) B Rowe	4	1	2
(United States) S Mayer	6	6	6
(United States) P DuPré	2	1	2
(France) P Dominguez	6	2	5	2
(Czechoslovakia) I Lendl	3	6	7	6
(New Zealand) C Lewis	6	3	4	2
9	(United States) A Ashe	3	6	6	6

Third round
4	(United States) V Gerulaitis	6	6	6
(United States) S Mayer	1	1	2
(Czechoslovakia) I Lendl	5	7	6	6
9	(United States) A Ashe	7	6	2	3

Fourth round
4	(United States) V Gerulaitis	6	6	6
(Czechoslovakia) I Lendl	2	1	3

==== Section 4 ====
First round
16	(Italy) A Panatta	6	6	6
(Spain) A Giménez	3	3	3
(Czechoslovakia) J Kodeš	7	6	3	6	7
(Australia) D Crealy	6	7	6	4	5
(United States) R Crawford	2	6	4	1
Q	(Brazil) C Motta	6	4	6	6
(United States) F Taygan	1	3	7	6	5
(United States) E Teltscher	6	6	5	2	7
(United States) B Manson	6	6	7
(France) R Brunet	3	2	6
(Italy) G Ocleppo	6	4	6	7
(France) G Goven	4	6	2	5
(Chile) B Prajoux	1	3	4
(United States) M Cahill	6	6	6
(Australia) M Edmondson	3	6	6	1	2
8	(Spain) J Higueras	6	4	4	6	6

Second round
16	(Italy) A Panatta	6	6	6
(Czechoslovakia) J Kodeš	1	2	4
Q	(Brazil) C Motta	6	2	7	0	1
(United States) E Teltscher	3	6	6	6	6
(United States) B Manson	2	6	6	7
(Italy) G Ocleppo	6	3	4	5
(United States) M Cahill	6	6	5	5
8	(Spain) J Higueras	4	7	7	7

Third round
16	(Italy) A Panatta	6	6	4	2	3
(United States) E Teltscher	3	3	6	6	6
(United States) B Manson	2	6	3	2
8	(Spain) J Higueras	6	2	6	6

Fourth round
(United States) E Teltscher	3	4	6	6	3
8	(Spain) J Higueras	6	6	3	1	6

=== Bottom half ===
==== Section 5 ====
First round
6	(United States) H Solomon	6	6	7
Q	(United States) E Van Dillen	3	2	5
LL	(United States) H Hoyt	5	4	2
(France) P Portes	7	6	6
(New Zealand) R Simpson	6	1	7	2	3
(South Africa) J Yuill	3	6	5	6	6
(Socialist Federal Republic of Yugoslavia) Z Franulović	3	2	6
(United States) S Smith	6	6	7
(Australia) J Marks	2	1	6
(Czechoslovakia) P Složil	6	6	7
(France) F Jauffret	7	4	5	1
(Paraguay) V Pecci	6	6	7	6
Q	(Colombia) J Velasco Sr.	2	2	1
(Switzerland) C Dowdeswell	6	6	6
(France) E Deblicker	4	2	5
15	(Italy) C Barazzutti	6	6	7

Second round
6	(United States) H Solomon	6	6	6
(France) P Portes	2	1	1
(South Africa) J Yuill	0	2	1
(United States) S Smith	6	6	6
(Czechoslovakia) P Složil	3	6	3	4
(Paraguay) V Pecci	6	2	6	6
(Switzerland) C Dowdeswell	7	1	2	6	3
15	(Italy) C Barazzutti	6	6	6	4	6

Third round
6	(United States) H Solomon	3	1	6	6	8
(United States) S Smith	6	6	3	1	6
(Paraguay) V Pecci	7	6	7
15	(Italy) C Barazzutti	5	3	6

Fourth round
6	(United States) H Solomon	1	4	3
(Paraguay) V Pecci	6	6	6

==== Section 6 ====
First round
10	(United States) B Gottfried	7	6	6
(Canada) R Genois	5	2	4
(West Germany) A Maurer	1	1	6
(Australia) K Warwick	6	6	7
Q	(Sweden) T Svensson	7	2	1	3
(United States) G Mayer	6	6	6	6
(France) Y Noah	7	6	6	6	6
(United States) B Martin	5	7	2	7	3
(United States) B Teacher	6	6	4	6
Q	(Spain) J López-Maeso	2	3	6	2
(France) J-F Caujolle	7	6	6
(France) J-L Haillet	6	2	2
(South Africa) D Joubert	3	6	6	4	5
Q	(France) C Roger-Vasselin	6	0	2	6	7
(Australia) P Dent	1	0	7	1
3	(Argentina) G Vilas	6	6	5	6

Second round
10	(United States) B Gottfried	6	6	6
(Australia) K Warwick	2	0	4
(United States) G Mayer	3	0	6	6	6
(France) Y Noah	6	6	3	4	3
(United States) B Teacher	6	6	2	5
(France) J-F Caujolle	7	1	6	7
Q	(France) C Roger-Vasselin	4	5	3
3	(Argentina) G Vilas	6	7	6

Third round
10	(United States) B Gottfried	6	7	6	3	2
(United States) G Mayer	1	6	7	6	6
(France) J-F Caujolle	3	1	3
3	(Argentina) G Vilas	6	6	6

Fourth round
(United States) G Mayer	5	6	7	1	2
3	(Argentina) G Vilas	7	1	6	6	6

==== Section 7 ====
First round
7	(United States) E Dibbs	6	6	4	6
(United States) N Saviano	3	3	6	2
(France) C Freyss	6	6	6
Q	(Argentina) L Álvarez	3	2	4
(Australia) D Carter	4	3	6	7	6
Q	(United States) B Maze	6	6	2	6	2
(United Kingdom) B Mottram	1	6	6	7
(Sweden) K Johansson	6	1	1	6
(Czechoslovakia) J Hřebec	5	2	3
(France) D Bedel	7	6	6
(France) B Fritz	3	6	2	7	3
(United Kingdom) J Lloyd	6	3	6	6	6
Q	(Australia) W Maher	6	5	6	6
Q	(West Germany) M Wünschig	3	7	0	4
(Switzerland) H Günthardt	1	6	5	4
12	(Poland) W Fibak	6	4	7	6

Second round
7	(United States) E Dibbs	6	6	6
(France) C Freyss	0	4	3
(Australia) D Carter	3	2	0
(United Kingdom) B Mottram	6	6	6
(France) D Bedel	6	6	6
(United Kingdom) J Lloyd	2	1	4
Q	(Australia) W Maher	2	0	1
12	(Poland) W Fibak	6	6	6

Third round
7	(United States) E Dibbs	6	6	6
(United Kingdom) B Mottram	3	3	2
(France) D Bedel	7	6	5	2
12	(Poland) W Fibak	5	7	7	6

Fourth round
7	(United States) E Dibbs	4	6	6	1	6
12	(Poland) W Fibak	6	4	1	6	4

==== Section 8 ====
First round
13	(Spain) M Orantes	4	6	6	6
(Romania) I Năstase	6	4	1	2
(Italy) P Bertolucci	0	2	r
(Hungary) B Taróczy	6	6
(Australia) A Gardiner	4	6	2
Q	(Brazil) R Guedes	6	7	6
(Brazil) J Soares	4	2	7	2
(West Germany) R Gehring	6	6	6	6
(Argentina) R Cano	4	7	7	4	4
(Australia) R Case	6	6	6	6	6
(Australia) J James	6	7	6
(Ecuador) R Ycaza	2	6	1
(United States) P Fleming	4	3	4
(India) R Krishnan	6	6	6
(United States) T Moor	1	2	3
2	(United States) J Connors	6	6	6

Second round
13	(Spain) M Orantes	7	6	6
(Hungary) B Taróczy	6	4	2
Q	(Brazil) R Guedes	4	1	3
(West Germany) R Gehring	6	6	6
(Australia) R Case	6	6	7
(Australia) J James	1	3	6
(India) R Krishnan	1	1	4
2	(United States) J Connors	6	6	6

Third round
13	(Spain) M Orantes	6	6	6
(West Germany) R Gehring	2	1	2
(Australia) R Case	6	2	5
2	(United States) J Connors	7	6	7

Fourth round
13	(Spain) M Orantes	6	1	3	1
2	(United States) J Connors	4	6	6	6

Preceded by 1978 Australian Open	Grand Slam men's singles	Succeeded by 1979 Wimbledon Championships
