= Chantranith Ros =

Cambodian-born French man tennis player

- Country (sports): Cambodia; France
- Born: 1955 Kampot, Cambodia

Doubles

Grand Slam doubles results
- French Open: 1R (1978, 1979)

Grand Slam mixed doubles results
- French Open: 2R (1979)

Chantranith Ros (born 1955) is a Cambodian-born French former tennis player.

Born in Kampot, Chantranith held dual nationality with France and fled to the European country in 1975, as the Khmer Rouge took control of his homeland.

In the late 1970s he made main draw appearances at the French Open as a doubles player. His best performance was a second round appearance in mixed doubles at the 1979 French Open.
