= 1981 Grand Marnier Tennis Games – Singles =

Singles
- 1981 Grand Marnier Tennis Games

Final
- Champion: (United States) Jimmy Connors
- Runner-up: (Czechoslovakia) Ivan Lendl
- Score: 6–3, 7–6

Details
- Draw: 64
- Seeds: 16

Events
Singles	Doubles
- Grand Marnier Tennis Games

Jimmy Connors won in the final 6–3, 7–6 against Ivan Lendl.

== Seeds ==
1. (United States) Jimmy Connors (champion)
2. (Czechoslovakia) Ivan Lendl (final)
3. (United States) Harold Solomon (semifinals)
4. (United States) Brian Teacher (first round)
5. (United States) Roscoe Tanner (quarterfinals)
6. (France) Yannick Noah (first round)
7. (United States) Eliot Teltscher (semifinals)
8. (United States) Brian Gottfried (quarterfinals)
9. (United States) Eddie Dibbs (third round)
10. (South Africa) Johan Kriek (second round)
11. (United States) Victor Amaya (first round, retired)
12. (Australia) Kim Warwick (first round)
13. (United States) Robert Lutz (third round)
14. (Czechoslovakia) Tomáš Šmíd (quarterfinals)
15. (Spain) José Higueras (second round)
16. (United States) Mel Purcell (third round)

== Draw ==
Key

- Q = Qualifier
- WC = Wild card
- LL = Lucky loser
- Alt = Alternate
- ITF = ITF entry
- PR = Protected ranking
- SR = Special ranking
- SE = Special exempt
- JE = Junior exempt
- JR = Junior Accelerator Programme entrant
- CO = College Accelerator Programme entrant
- NG = Next Gen Accelerator Program entrant
- w/o = Walkover
- r = Retired
- d = Defaulted

=== Finals ===
Semifinals
1	(United States) Jimmy Connors	6	6	6
7	(United States) Eliot Teltscher	3	7	4
3	(United States) Harold Solomon	2	1
2	(Czechoslovakia) Ivan Lendl	6	6

Final
1	(United States) Jimmy Connors	6	7
2	(Czechoslovakia) Ivan Lendl	3	6

=== Top half ===
==== Section 1 ====
First round
1	(United States) J Connors	6	6
(United States) D Stockton	4	4
Q	(United States) C Dunk	6	6
(United States) C Mayotte	4	3
(United States) T Moor	6	6
(United States) T Wilkison	4	2
(United States) J Hayes	3	1
15	(Spain) J Higueras	6	6
11	(United States) V Amaya	6	3	r
(France) C Roger-Vasselin	1	6
(United States) P Du Pré	6	6
(United States) G Holroyd	4	1
(Australia) P Dent	7	6
Q	(United States) W Redondo	5	3
Q	(United States) R Van't Hof	7	6
6	(France) Y Noah	5	4

Second round
1	(United States) J Connors	6	6
Q	(United States) C Dunk	3	1
(United States) T Moor	6	6
15	(Spain) J Higueras	3	1
(France) C Roger-Vasselin	7	5	4
(United States) P Du Pré	6	7	6
(Australia) P Dent	6	6
Q	(United States) R Van't Hof	3	4

Third round
1	(United States) J Connors	6	6
(United States) T Moor	0	2
(United States) P Du Pré	6	6
(Australia) P Dent	4	0

Quarterfinals
1	(United States) J Connors	6	6
(United States) P Du Pré	1	1

==== Section 2 ====
First round
4	(United States) B Teacher	6	6	4
(United States) B Walts	4	7	6
(Australia) P Kronk	6	6
(United States) S Stewart	1	4
(United States) F Buehning	7	6
(Spain) J López-Maeso	6	1
(Zimbabwe) A Pattison	4	5
14	(Czechoslovakia) T Šmíd	6	7
9	(United States) E Dibbs	6	6
Q	(United States) C Delaney	4	2
(Australia) R Frawley	3	7	6
(United States) B Manson	6	6	1
(United States) G Hardie	3	6	6
(United States) F Taygan	6	3	2
(France) P Portes	4	2
7	(United States) E Teltscher	6	6

Second round
(United States) B Walts	6	6
(Australia) P Kronk	7	7
(United States) F Buehning	6	6
14	(Czechoslovakia) T Šmíd	7	7
9	(United States) E Dibbs	6	6
(Australia) R Frawley	1	4
(United States) G Hardie	1	0
7	(United States) E Teltscher	6	6

Third round
(Australia) P Kronk	1	3
14	(Czechoslovakia) T Šmíd	6	6
9	(United States) E Dibbs	2	1
7	(United States) E Teltscher	6	6

Quarterfinals
14	(Czechoslovakia) T Šmíd	6	6
7	(United States) E Teltscher	7	7

=== Bottom half ===
==== Section 3 ====
First round
8	(United States) B Gottfried	6	6
(France) T Tulasne	4	2
(United States) J Austin	6	6
(South Africa) E Edwards	2	2
(United States) S Mayer	6	6
(Australia) J Alexander	3	2
(United States) P Rennert	7	6	3
16	(United States) M Purcell	5	7	6
10	(South Africa) J Kriek	6	7
(Australia) C Dibley	3	6
(United States) T Waltke	6	6
(United States) M Bauer	0	4
(New Zealand) R Simpson	6	4	7
(France) C Freyss	4	6	5
(Colombia) A Cortes	1	3
3	(United States) H Solomon	6	6

Second round
8	(United States) B Gottfried	6	6
(United States) J Austin	3	4
(United States) S Mayer	4	6	0
16	(United States) M Purcell	6	4	6
10	(South Africa) J Kriek	5	1
(United States) T Waltke	7	6
(New Zealand) R Simpson	7	3	0
3	(United States) H Solomon	6	6	6

Third round
8	(United States) B Gottfried	6	6
16	(United States) M Purcell	4	3
(United States) T Waltke	3	2
3	(United States) H Solomon	6	6

Quarterfinals
8	(United States) B Gottfried	6	4	6
3	(United States) H Solomon	3	6	7

==== Section 4 ====
First round
5	(United States) R Tanner	6	6	6
(United States) T Gullikson	7	2	4
(South Africa) B Mitton	4	6	6
(United States) B Martin	6	1	3
(West Germany) R Gehring	6	4	6
Q	(United States) J Delaney	3	6	4
(United States) H Pfister	7	6
12	(Australia) K Warwick	6	3
13	(United States) R Lutz	6	6
(United States) M Riessen	3	4
(United States) N Saviano	6	6	7
(United States) R Meyer	7	4	5
Q	(United States) M Davis	6	6
(South Africa) R Moore	4	1
(United States) S Smith	1	5
2	(Czechoslovakia) I Lendl	6	7

Second round
5	(United States) R Tanner	6	3	6
(South Africa) B Mitton	3	6	3
(West Germany) R Gehring	2	2
(United States) H Pfister	6	6
13	(United States) R Lutz	6	6
(United States) N Saviano	2	4
Q	(United States) M Davis	6	7	3
2	(Czechoslovakia) I Lendl	7	6	6

Third round
5	(United States) R Tanner	6	6	6
(United States) H Pfister	7	4	4
13	(United States) R Lutz	1	6	4
2	(Czechoslovakia) I Lendl	6	4	6

Quarterfinals
5	(United States) R Tanner	6	1
2	(Czechoslovakia) I Lendl	7	6
