= 1981 Grand Marnier Tennis Games =

- Date: February 16–22
- Edition: 8th
- Category: Grand Prix
- Draw: 64S / 32D
- Prize money: $175,000
- Surface: Hard / outdoor
- Location: La Quinta, California, U.S.
- Venue: La Quinta Resort and Club

Champions

Singles
- (United States) Jimmy Connors

Doubles
- (United States) Bruce Manson / (United States) Brian Teacher
- Indian Wells Masters

The 1981 Grand Marnier Tennis Games was a men's professional tennis tournament played on outdoor hard courts. It was the eighth edition of the tournament and was part of the Super Series of the 1981 Volvo Grand Prix. It was played at the La Quinta Resort and Club in La Quinta, California in the United States and was held from February 16 through February 22, 1981. First-seeded Jimmy Connors won the singles title.

== Finals ==
=== Singles ===
(United States) Jimmy Connors defeated (Czechoslovakia) Ivan Lendl 6–3, 7–6

- It was Connors' 1st singles title of the year and the 86th of his career.

=== Doubles ===
(United States) Bruce Manson / (United States) Brian Teacher defeated (United States) Terry Moor / (United States) Eliot Teltscher 7–6, 6–2

- It was Manson's 1st title of the year and the 6th of his career. It was Teacher's 1st title of the year and the 13th of his career.
