= 1979 French Open – Women's singles =

Women's singles
- 1979 French Open

Final
- Champion: (United States) Chris Evert
- Runner-up: (Australia) Wendy Turnbull
- Score: 6–2, 6–0

Details
- Draw: 64
- Seeds: 16

Events
Singles	men	women		boys	girls
Doubles	men	women	mixed	boys	girls
WC Singles	men	women	quad
WC Doubles	men	women	quad
Legends	−45	45+	women
- French Open

Chris Evert defeated Wendy Turnbull in the final, 6–2, 6–0 to win the women's singles tennis title at the 1979 French Open. It was her third French Open singles title and her ninth major singles title overall. Evert extended her win streak at the event to 18 matches, having won the title on her last two appearances in 1974 and 1975.

Virginia Ruzici was the defending champion, but lost in the quarterfinals to Dianne Fromholtz.

== Seeds ==
The seeded players are listed below. Chris Evert is the champion; others show the round in which they were eliminated.

1. (United States) Chris Evert (champion)
2. (United Kingdom) Virginia Wade (second round)
3. (Australia) Dianne Fromholtz (semifinals)
4. (Australia) Wendy Turnbull (finalist)
5. (Romania) Virginia Ruzici (quarterfinals)
6. (United Kingdom) Sue Barker (second round)
7. (Czechoslovakia) Regina Maršíková (semifinals)
8. (Netherlands) Betty Stöve (third round)
9. (Socialist Federal Republic of Yugoslavia) Mima Jaušovec (second round)
10. (United States) Kathy May-Teacher (second round)
11. (United States) Rosie Casals (first round)
12. (South Africa) Marise Kruger (second round)
13. (United States) Anne Smith (third round)
14. (South Africa) Ilana Kloss (second round)
15. n/a
16. (United States) Marita Redondo (first round)

== Draw ==
=== Key ===
- Q = Qualifier
- WC = Wild card
- LL = Lucky loser
- r = Retired

=== Finals ===
Quarterfinals
1	(United States) Chris Evert	6	6
(United States) Ruta Gerulaitis	0	4
3	(Australia) Dianne Fromholtz	6	6
5	(Romania) Virginia Ruzici	0	4
(Czechoslovakia) Hana Mandlíková	3	3
4	(Australia) Wendy Turnbull	6	6
7	(Czechoslovakia) Regina Maršíková	6	6
(Czechoslovakia) Renáta Tomanová	1	1

Semifinals
1	(United States) Chris Evert	6	6
3	(Australia) Dianne Fromholtz	1	3
4	(Australia) Wendy Turnbull	6	6
7	(Czechoslovakia) Regina Maršíková	4	3

Finals
1	(United States) Chris Evert	6	6
4	(Australia) Wendy Turnbull	2	0

=== Earlier rounds ===
==== Section 1 ====
First round
1	(United States) Evert	6	6
(United States) Latham	1	0
(United States) duPont	7	5	6
(United States) Jordan	6	7	3
(Argentina) Madruga	7	6
(Australia) Hunt	6	1
9	(Socialist Federal Republic of Yugoslavia) Jaušovec	6	6
(France) Chevalier	2	3
14	(South Africa) Kloss	6	5	6
(France) Fuchs	2	7	0
(United States) Gerulaitis	6	6	6
(Australia) O'Neil	2	7	0
(France) Simon	6	1	6
(United States) Stoll	2	6	3
8	(Netherlands) Stöve	6	6
(Argentina) González	0	3

Second round
1	(United States) Evert	6	6
(United States) duPont	3	3
(Argentina) Madruga	6	6
9	(Socialist Federal Republic of Yugoslavia) Jaušovec	4	4
14	(South Africa) Kloss	0
(United States) Gerulaitis	6
(France) Simon	6	6	3
8	(Netherlands) Stöve	7	4	6

Third round
1	(United States) Evert	4	6	6
(Argentina) Madruga	6	2	3
(United States) Gerulaitis	6	6
8	(Netherlands) Stöve	1	4

Quarterfinals
1	(United States) Evert	6	6
(United States) Gerulaitis	0	4

==== Section 2 ====
First round
3	(Australia) Fromholtz	6	6
(United States) Fox	4	1
(Argentina) Raponi	6	7
(Australia) Doerner	4	6
(West Germany) Bunge	6	6
(United States) McDaniel	3	4
12	(South Africa) Kruger	7	6
(United States) Blount	6	0
(Czechoslovakia) Budařová	6	6
(United States) Liess	1	2
(United States) Walsh	2	6	6
(France) Thibault	6	4	2
(United Kingdom) Hobbs	6	2	6
(South Africa) Vermaak	3	6	3
5	(Romania) Ruzici	6	6
(Switzerland) Delhees	3	3

Second round
3	(Australia) Fromholtz	6	6
(Argentina) Raponi	2	1
(West Germany) Bunge	6	5	7
12	(South Africa) Kruger	1	7	5
(Czechoslovakia) Budařová	6	6
(United States) Walsh	4	2
(United Kingdom) Hobbs	4	0
5	(Romania) Ruzici	6	6

Third round
3	(Australia) Fromholtz	6	6
(West Germany) Bunge	0	1
(Czechoslovakia) Budařová	1	5
5	(Romania) Ruzici	6	7

Quarterfinals
3	(Australia) Fromholtz	6	6
5	(Romania) Ruzici	0	4

==== Section 3 ====
First round
6	(United Kingdom) Barker	6	7
(West Germany) Eisterlehner	2	6
(Czechoslovakia) Mandlíková	6	6
(Romania) Simionescu	4	4
(United States) Stuart	2	7	8
(Argentina) Villagrán	6	6	6
(Czechoslovakia) Strachoňová	6	6
11	(United States) Casals	1	1
(United States) Allen	6	6
16	(United States) Redondo	3	4
(Netherlands) Vessies	6	6
(United States) Newberry	4	4
(United States) DuVall	6	6
(West Germany) Hanika	4	3
4	(Australia) Turnbull	6	6
(United States) Smith	4	2

Second round
6	(United Kingdom) Barker	6	6	1
(Czechoslovakia) Mandlíková	7	2	6
(United States) Stuart	6	2	6
(Czechoslovakia) Strachoňová	3	6	1
(United States) Allen	6	6	6
(Netherlands) Vessies	2	7	3
(United States) DuVall	3	3
4	(Australia) Turnbull	6	6

Third round
(Czechoslovakia) Mandlíková	6	7
(United States) Stuart	4	6
(United States) Allen	2	3
4	(Australia) Turnbull	6	6

Quarterfinals
(Czechoslovakia) Mandlíková	3	3
4	(Australia) Turnbull	6	6

==== Section 4 ====
First round
7	(Czechoslovakia) Maršíková	6	4	6
(United States) Teeguarden	4	6	0
(United States) Forood	6	6
(United States) Siegel	2	1
(United States) Acker	7	6
(United States) Desfor	6	3
13	(United States) Smith	6	6
(France) Dürr	1	1
10	(United States) May-Teacher	4	6	6
(Italy) Porzio	6	1	0
(Romania) Romanov	6	6
(United States) Stratton	1	1
(Czechoslovakia) Tomanová	6	6	6
(France) Beillan	7	2	4
2	(United Kingdom) Wade	7	7
(France) Lovera	5	6

Second round
7	(Czechoslovakia) Maršíková	6	6
(United States) Forood	3	2
(United States) Acker	1	0
13	(United States) Smith	6	6
10	(United States) May-Teacher	1	4
(Romania) Romanov	6	6
(Czechoslovakia) Tomanová	6	4	6
2	(United Kingdom) Wade	2	6	2

Third round
7	(Czechoslovakia) Maršíková	6	7
13	(United States) Smith	3	6
(Romania) Romanov	4	2
(Czechoslovakia) Tomanová	6	6

Quarterfinals
7	(Czechoslovakia) Maršíková	6	6
(Czechoslovakia) Tomanová	1	1

Preceded by 1978 Australian Open – Women's singles	Grand Slam women's singles	Succeeded by 1979 Wimbledon Championships – Women's singles
