= 1979 French Open – Women's doubles =

Tennis tournament

Women's doubles
- 1979 French Open

Final
- Champion: (Netherlands) Betty Stöve (Australia) Wendy Turnbull
- Runner-up: (France) Françoise Dürr (United Kingdom) Virginia Wade
- Score: 3–6, 7–5, 6–4

Events
Singles	men	women		boys	girls
Doubles	men	women	mixed	boys	girls
WC Singles	men	women	quad
WC Doubles	men	women	quad
Legends	−45	45+	women
- French Open

Mima Jaušovec and Virginia Ruzici were the defending champions but lost in the second round to Sherry Acker and Anne Smith.

Betty Stöve and Wendy Turnbull won in the final 3–6, 7–5, 6–4 against Françoise Dürr and Virginia Wade.

== Seeds ==
1. (Netherlands) Betty Stöve / (Australia) Wendy Turnbull (champions)
2. (France) Françoise Dürr / (United Kingdom) Virginia Wade (final)
3. (Socialist Federal Republic of Yugoslavia) Mima Jaušovec / (Romania) Virginia Ruzici (second round)
4. (United States) Rosie Casals / (United States) Chris Evert (quarterfinals)

== Draw ==
Key

- Q = Qualifier
- WC = Wild card
- LL = Lucky loser
- Alt = Alternate
- ITF = ITF entry
- PR = Protected ranking
- SR = Special ranking
- SE = Special exempt
- JE = Junior exempt
- JR = Junior Accelerator Programme entrant
- CO = College Accelerator Programme entrant
- NG = Next Gen Accelerator Program entrant
- w/o = Walkover
- r = Retired
- d = Defaulted

=== Finals ===
Semifinals
1	(Netherlands) Betty Stöve (Australia) Wendy Turnbull	6	7
(South Africa) Ilana Kloss (United States) Betty Ann Stuart	3	6
(Australia) Dianne Fromholtz (South Africa) Marise Kruger	4	6
2	(France) Françoise Dürr (United Kingdom) Virginia Wade	6	7

Final
1	(Netherlands) Betty Stöve (Australia) Wendy Turnbull	3	7	6
2	(France) Françoise Dürr (United Kingdom) Virginia Wade	6	5	4

=== Top half ===
First round
1	(Netherlands) B Stöve (Australia) W Turnbull	6	6
(West Germany) B Bunge (Argentina) I Madruga	2	1
(United Kingdom) A Hobbs (South Africa) Y Vermaak	6	6
(United States) L Siegel (Italy) S Simmonds	1	0
(Italy) D Porzio (France) F Thibault	5	5
(Australia) C O'Neil (Sweden) M Wikstedt	7	7
(Australia) C Doerner (United States) L Forood	2	2
(France) G Lovera (United States) P Teeguarden	6	6
3	(Socialist Federal Republic of Yugoslavia) M Jaušovec (Romania) V Ruzici	6	6
(United States) R Blount (Argentina) V González	4	4
(United States) S Acker (United States) A Smith	5	6	6
(United States) L Allen (United States) K McDaniel	7	3	4
(South Africa) B Cuypers (United States) L duPont	6	6
(Argentina) C Casabianca (Argentina) E Raponi	4	1
(United States) K Sands (Chile) S Urroz	4	0
(South Africa) I Kloss (United States) BA Stuart	6	6

Second round
1	(Netherlands) B Stöve (Australia) W Turnbull	6	6
(United Kingdom) A Hobbs (South Africa) Y Vermaak	3	4
(Australia) C O'Neil (Sweden) M Wikstedt	6	2	1
(France) G Lovera (United States) P Teeguarden	2	6	6
3	(Socialist Federal Republic of Yugoslavia) M Jaušovec (Romania) V Ruzici	3	6
(United States) S Acker (United States) A Smith	6	7
(South Africa) B Cuypers (United States) L duPont	4	5
(South Africa) I Kloss (United States) BA Stuart	6	7

Quarterfinals
1	(Netherlands) B Stöve (Australia) W Turnbull	6	6
(France) G Lovera (United States) P Teeguarden	3	2
(United States) S Acker (United States) A Smith	2	6	4
(South Africa) I Kloss (United States) BA Stuart	6	2	6

Semifinals
1	(Netherlands) B Stöve (Australia) W Turnbull	6	7
(South Africa) I Kloss (United States) BA Stuart	3	6

=== Bottom half ===
First round
(Australia) D Fromholtz (South Africa) M Kruger	6	1	6
(France) N Fuchs (Argentina) A Villagrán	0	6	1
(United States) P Bostrom (United States) M Redondo	6	6
(Italy) MT Nasuelli (Romania) M Simionescu	2	3
(United States) R Fox (United States) P Smith	6	6
(Australia) N Gregory (Japan) N Sato	3	1
(France) D Beillan (France) B Simon	1	0
4	(United States) R Casals (United States) C Evert	6	6
(Czechoslovakia) H Mandlíková (Czechoslovakia) R Maršíková	6	6
(Czechoslovakia) I Budařová (Czechoslovakia) H Strachoňová	2	2
(Australia) D Evers (Czechoslovakia) R Tomanová	6	6
(United States) J Harrington (United States) A Whitmore	2	0
(Argentina) R Giscafré (United States) J Stratton	2	0
(United States) D Desfor (United States) K Jordan	6	6
(Switzerland) P Delhees (Netherlands) E Vessies	0	1
2	(France) F Dürr (United Kingdom) V Wade	6	6

Second round
(Australia) D Fromholtz (South Africa) M Kruger	6	6
(United States) P Bostrom (United States) M Redondo	0	3
(United States) R Fox (United States) P Smith	4	4
4	(United States) R Casals (United States) C Evert	6	6
(Czechoslovakia) H Mandlíková (Czechoslovakia) R Maršíková	6	6
(Australia) D Evers (Czechoslovakia) R Tomanová	4	4
(United States) D Desfor (United States) K Jordan	1	4
2	(France) F Dürr (United Kingdom) V Wade	6	6

Quarterfinals
(Australia) D Fromholtz (South Africa) M Kruger	7	6
4	(United States) R Casals (United States) C Evert	5	3
(Czechoslovakia) H Mandlíková (Czechoslovakia) R Maršíková	6	1	6
2	(France) F Dürr (United Kingdom) V Wade	4	6	8

Semifinals
(Australia) D Fromholtz (South Africa) M Kruger	4	6
2	(France) F Dürr (United Kingdom) V Wade	6	7
