= Wendy Turnbull =

Australian tennis player

Wendy Turnbull MBE
- Country (sports): Australia
- Residence: Boca Raton, Florida, U.S. Sandgate, Queensland, Australia
- Born: 26 November 1952 (age 73) Brisbane, Queensland, Australia
- Height: 1.64 m (5 ft 4 1/2 in)
- Turned pro: 1975
- Retired: 1989
- Plays: Right-handed (one handed-backhand)
- Prize money: US$ 2,769,024

Singles
- Career record: 478–250
- Career titles: 11
- Highest ranking: No. 3 (7 January 1985)

Grand Slam singles results
- Australian Open: F (1980)
- French Open: F (1979)
- Wimbledon: QF (1979, 1980, 1981)
- US Open: F (1977)

Doubles
- Career record: 653–225
- Career titles: 55
- Highest ranking: No. 5 (19 January 1987)

Grand Slam doubles results
- Australian Open: F (1983, 1988)
- French Open: W (1979)
- Wimbledon: W (1978)
- US Open: W (1979, 1982)

Other doubles tournaments
- Tour Finals: W (1986^{Mar})

Mixed doubles
- Career titles: 5

Grand Slam mixed doubles results
- French Open: W (1979, 1982)
- Wimbledon: W (1983, 1984)
- US Open: W (1980)
Medal record
Olympic Games
Bronze medal – third place	1988 Seoul	Women's doubles

Wendy Turnbull, MBE (born 26 November 1952) is an Australian former tennis player. During her career, she won nine Grand Slam titles, four of them in women's doubles and five of them in mixed doubles. She also was a three-time Grand Slam runner-up in singles and won 11 singles titles and 55 doubles titles.

== Career ==
Turnbull turned professional in 1975. Her career high rankings were third in singles and fifth in doubles. She was ranked in the year-end world top 20 for 10 consecutive years (1977 through 1986) and in the year-end world top 10 for eight consecutive years from 1977 to 1984. She was nicknamed "Rabbit" by her peers because of her foot speed around the court.

Turnbull was a singles runner-up at the 1977 US Open, the 1979 French Open, and the 1980 Australian Open. She won four women's doubles titles and five mixed doubles titles at Grand Slam events.

She was a 12-time runner-up in Grand Slam doubles events: 11 times in women's doubles and one time in mixed doubles. Nine of her 11 women's doubles losses were to teams that included Martina Navratilova.

Turnbull teamed with Elizabeth Smylie to win the bronze medal in women's doubles at the 1988 Summer Olympics in Seoul. She is one of very few players to have a winning record against Steffi Graf (2–1 in head-to-head matches).

Turnbull was a member of Australia's Fed Cup team from 1977 through 1988, compiling a 46–16 overall win–loss record (17–8 in singles and 29–8 in doubles). She was the captain or coach of the team from 1985 to 1993.

In 1979, the Supersisters trading card set was produced and distributed; one of the cards featured Turnbull's name and picture.

Turnbull was appointed to the International Tennis Federation (ITF) Olympic Committee in 1991, the only player appointed to the committee. She also serves on the ITF's Fed Cup Committee.

Wendy Turnbull was made a Member of the Order of the British Empire in 1984. In December 1993, the city of Brisbane named a public park in her honour. She was inducted into the Australian Tennis Hall of Fame in 2009.

== Significant finals ==
=== Grand Slam finals ===
==== Singles: 3 (3 runner-ups) ====
Result	Year	Championship	Surface	Opponent	Score
Loss	1977	US Open	Clay	(United States) Chris Evert	7–6^{(7–3)}, 6–2
Loss	1979	French Open	Clay	(United States) Chris Evert	6–2, 6–0
Loss	1980	Australian Open	Grass	(Czechoslovakia) Hana Mandlíková	6–0, 7–5

==== Doubles: 15 (4 titles, 11 runner-ups) ====
Result	Year	Championship	Surface	Partner	Opponents	Score
Win	1978	Wimbledon	Grass	(Australia) Kerry Melville Reid	(Socialist Federal Republic of Yugoslavia) Mima Jaušovec (Romania) Virginia Ruzici	4–6, 9–8^{(12–10)}, 6–3
Loss	1978	US Open	Hard	(Australia) Kerry Melville Reid	(United States) Billie Jean King (United States) Martina Navratilova	7–6, 6–4
Win	1979	French Open	Clay	(Netherlands) Betty Stöve	(France) Françoise Dürr (United Kingdom) Virginia Wade	3–6, 7–5, 6–4
Loss	1979	Wimbledon	Grass	(Netherlands) Betty Stöve	(United States) Billie Jean King (United States) Martina Navratilova	5–7, 6–3, 6–2
Win	1979	US Open	Hard	(Netherlands) Betty Stöve	(United States) Billie Jean King (United States) Martina Navratilova	7–5, 6–3
Loss	1980	Wimbledon	Grass	(United States) Rosie Casals	(United States) Kathy Jordan (United States) Anne Smith	4–6, 7–5, 6–1
Loss	1981	US Open	Hard	(United States) Rosie Casals	(United States) Kathy Jordan (United States) Anne Smith	6–3, 6–3
Loss	1982	French Open	Clay	(United States) Rosie Casals	(United States) Martina Navratilova (United States) Anne Smith	6–3, 6–4
Win	1982	US Open	Hard	(United States) Rosie Casals	(United States) Barbara Potter (United States) Sharon Walsh	6–4, 6–4
Loss	1983	Wimbledon	Grass	(United States) Rosie Casals	(United States) Martina Navratilova (United States) Pam Shriver	6–2, 6–2
Loss	1983	Australian Open	Grass	(United Kingdom) Anne Hobbs	(United States) Martina Navratilova (United States) Pam Shriver	6–4, 6–7, 6–2
Loss	1984	US Open	Hard	(United Kingdom) Anne Hobbs	(United States) Martina Navratilova (United States) Pam Shriver	6–2, 6–4
Loss	1986	Wimbledon	Grass	(Czechoslovakia) Hana Mandlíková	(United States) Martina Navratilova (United States) Pam Shriver	6–1, 6–3
Loss	1986	US Open	Hard	(Czechoslovakia) Hana Mandlíková	(United States) Martina Navratilova (United States) Pam Shriver	6–4, 3–6, 6–3
Loss	1988	Australian Open	Hard	(United States) Chris Evert	(United States) Martina Navratilova (United States) Pam Shriver	6–0, 7–5

==== Mixed doubles: 6 (5 titles, 1 runner-up) ====
Result	Year	Championship	Surface	Partner	Opponents	Score
Win	1979	French Open	Clay	(Australia) Bob Hewitt	(Romania) Virginia Ruzici (Romania) Ion Țiriac	6–3, 2–6, 6–3
Win	1980	US Open	Hard	(United States) Marty Riessen	(Netherlands) Betty Stöve (South Africa) Frew McMillan	7–5, 6–2
Win	1982	French Open	Clay	(United Kingdom) John Lloyd	(Brazil) Cláudia Monteiro (Brazil) Cássio Motta	6–2, 7–6
Loss	1982	Wimbledon	Grass	(United Kingdom) John Lloyd	(United States) Anne Smith (South Africa) Kevin Curren	2–6, 6–3, 7–5
Win	1983	Wimbledon	Grass	(United Kingdom) John Lloyd	(United States) Billie Jean King (United States) Steve Denton	6–7^{(5–7)}, 7–6^{(7–5)}, 7–5
Win	1984	Wimbledon	Grass	(United Kingdom) John Lloyd	(United States) Kathy Jordan (United States) Steve Denton	6–3, 6–3

=== Olympics ===
==== Doubles ====
Result	Year	Location	Surface	Partner	Opponents	Score
Bronze	1988	Seoul	Hard	(Australia) Elizabeth Smylie	Tied	DNP

Smylie and Turnbull lost in the semifinals to Pam Shriver and Zina Garrison. In 1988, there was no bronze medal play off match, both beaten semifinal pairs received bronze medals.

=== Year-end championships finals ===
==== Doubles: 2 (1 title, 1 runner-up) ====
Result	Year	Location	Surface	Partner	Opponents	Score
Loss	1980	New York	Carpet (i)	(United States) Rosemary Casals	(United States) Billie Jean King (United States) Martina Navratilova	6–3, 4–6, 6–3
Win	1986	New York	Carpet (i)	(Czechoslovakia) Hana Mandlíková	(West Germany) Claudia Kohde (Czechoslovakia) Helena Suková	6–4, 6–7^{(4–7)}, 6–3

== WTA career finals ==
=== Singles: 31 (11–20) ===
Winner – Legend Grand Slam tournaments (0–3) WTA Tour Championships (0–0) Virginia Slims, Avon, other (11–17)	Finals by surface Hard (2–5) Grass (3–7) Clay (2–3) Carpet (4–5)

Result	No.	Date	Tournament	Surface	Opponent	Score
Win	1.	May 1973	Surbiton, UK	Grass	(United States) Ann Kiyomura	6–2, 6–0
Win	2.	Jul 1976	Kitzbühel, Austria	Clay	(Romania) Virginia Ruzici	6–4, 5–7, 6–3
Win	3.	Nov 1976	Tokyo, Japan	Clay	(Belgium) Michele Gurdal	6–1, 6–1
Loss	1.	Aug 1977	US Open	Clay	(United States) Chris Evert	6–7^{(3–7)}, 2–6
Loss	2.	Oct 1977	Phoenix, US	Hard	(United States) Billie Jean King	6–1, 1–6, 0–6
Loss	3.	Nov 1977	Melbourne, Australia	Grass	(Australia) Evonne Goolagong	4–6, 1–6
Loss	4.	Jan 1978	Hollywood, US	Carpet (i)	(Australia) Evonne Goolagong	2–6, 3–6
Loss	5.	Dec 1978	Sydney, Australia	Grass	(Australia) Dianne Fromholtz	2–6, 5–7
Win	4.	Feb 1979	Detroit, US	Carpet (i)	(Romania) Virginia Ruzici	7–5, 1–6, 7–6^{(7–4)}
Win	5.	Mar 1979	Philadelphia, US	Carpet (i)	(United Kingdom) Virginia Wade	5–7, 6–3, 6–2
Loss	6.	May 1979	French Open	Clay	(United States) Chris Evert-Lloyd	2–6, 0–6
Loss	7.	Sep 1979	Atlanta, US	Carpet (i)	(United States) Martina Navratilova	6–7^{(6–8)}, 4–6
Loss	8.	Nov 1979	Melbourne, Australia	Grass	(Czechoslovakia) Hana Mandlíková	3–6, 2–6
Loss	9.	Jun 1980	Eastbourne, UK	Grass	(United States) Tracy Austin	6–7^{(3–7)}, 2–6
Loss	10.	Jul 1980	San Diego, US	Hard	(United States) Tracy Austin	1–6, 3–6
Loss	11.	Sep 1980	Atlanta, US	Carpet (i)	(Czechoslovakia) Hana Mandlíková	3–6, 5–7
Loss	12.	Oct 1980	Phoenix, US	Hard	(Czechoslovakia) Regina Maršíková	6–7, 6–7
Win	6.	Nov 1980	Hong Kong	Hard	(United States) Marcie Louie	6–0, 6–2
Loss	13.	Nov 1980	Australian Open	Grass	(Czechoslovakia) Hana Mandlíková	0–6, 5–7
Win	7.	Dec 1980	Sydney, Australia	Grass	(United States) Pam Shriver	3–6, 6–4, 7–6^{(10–8)}
Win	8.	Nov 1981	Hong Kong	Hard	(Italy) Sabina Simmonds	6–3, 6–4
Loss	14.	Jan 1982	Chicago, US	Carpet (i)	(United States) Martina Navratilova	4–6, 1–6
Loss	15.	Mar 1982	Boston, US	Carpet (i)	(United States) Kathy Jordan	5–7, 6–1, 4–6
Loss	16.	Apr 1982	Orlando, US	Clay	(United States) Martina Navratilova	2–6, 5–7
Win	9.	Nov 1982	Brisbane, Australia	Grass	(United States) Pam Shriver	6–3, 6–1
Win	10.	Dec 1982	Richmond, US	Carpet (i)	(United States) Tracy Austin	6–7^{(3–7)}, 6–4, 6–2
Win	11.	Mar 1983	Boston, US	Carpet (i)	(West Germany) Sylvia Hanika	6–4, 3–6, 6–4
Loss	17.	Jun 1983	Eastbourne, UK	Grass	(United States) Martina Navratilova	1–6, 1–6
Loss	18.	Nov 1983	Brisbane, Australia	Grass	(United States) Pam Shriver	4–6, 5–7
Loss	19.	Oct 1984	Los Angeles, US	Hard	(United States) Chris Evert-Lloyd	2–6, 3–6
Loss	20.	Apr 1985	San Diego, US	Hard	(United Kingdom) Annabel Croft	0–6, 6–7^{(5–7)}

=== Doubles: 110 (55–55) ===
Winner – Legend Grand Slam tournaments (4–11) WTA Championships (1–1) Tier I (0–0) Tier II (1–1) Tier III (0–0) Tier IV (0–2) Tier V (0–0) Virginia Slims, Avon, other (49–40)	Finals by surface Hard (10–16) Grass (12–11) Clay (12–8) Carpet (21–20)

Result	No.	Date	Tournament	Surface	Partner	Opponents	Score
Win	1.	7 May 1973	Bournemouth	Clay	(Australia) Patricia Coleman	(Australia) Evonne Goolagong (Australia) Janet Young	7–5, 7–5
Win	2.	6 January 1975	Auckland	Grass	(Australia) Evonne Goolagong	(United States) Laura duPont (United States) Ceci Martinez	6–3, 4–6, 6–4
Loss	1.	23 February 1976	San Antonio	Clay	(United States) Patricia Bostrom	(United States) Julie Anthony (Australia) Helen Gourlay	0–6, 4–6
Loss	2.	17 May 1976	Hamburg	Clay	(United States) Laura duPont	(South Africa) Linky Boshoff (South Africa) Ilana Kloss	6–4, 5–7, 1–6
Win	3.	5 July 1976	Gstaad	Clay	(United States) Betsy Nagelsen	(South Africa) Brigitte Cuypers (South Africa) Annette Du Plooy	6–4, 6–4
Loss	3.	9 August 1976	Indianapolis	Clay	(United States) Laura duPont	(South Africa) Linky Boshoff (South Africa) Ilana Kloss	2–6, 3–6
Win	4.	7 March 1977	Pensacola	Clay	(United States) Ann Kiyomura	(United States) Carrie Meyer (United States) Betsy Nagelsen	6–1, 6–2
Win	5.	17 October 1977	São Paulo	Hard	(Australia) Kerry Melville Reid	(United States) Martina Navratilova (Netherlands) Betty Stöve	6–3, 5–7, 6–2
Loss	4.	2 January 1978	Washington	Carpet (i)	(Netherlands) Betty Stöve	(United States) Billie Jean King (United States) Martina Navratilova	3–6, 5–7
Win	6.	9 January 1978	Hollywood	Carpet (i)	(United States) Rosie Casals	(France) Françoise Dürr (United Kingdom) Virginia Wade	6–2, 6–4
Win	7.	6 February 1978	Seattle	Carpet (i)	(Australia) Kerry Melville Reid	(United States) Patricia Bostrom (United States) Marita Redondo	6–2, 6–4
Loss	5.	20 February 1978	Detroit	Carpet (i)	(Australia) Kerry Melville Reid	(United States) Billie Jean King (United States) Martina Navratilova	3–6, 4–6
Loss	6.	27 February 1978	Kansas City	Carpet (i)	(Australia) Kerry Melville Reid	(United States) Billie Jean King (United States) Martina Navratilova	4–6, 4–6
Win	8.	20 March 1978	Philadelphia	Carpet (i)	(Australia) Kerry Melville Reid	(France) Françoise Dürr (United Kingdom) Virginia Wade	6–2, 7–5
Win	9.	26 June 1978	Wimbledon	Grass	(Australia) Kerry Melville Reid	(Socialist Federal Republic of Yugoslavia) Mima Jaušovec (Romania) Virginia Ruzici	4–6, 9–8^{(12–10)}, 6–3
Loss	7.	29 August 1978	US Open	Hard	(Australia) Kerry Melville Reid	(United States) Billie Jean King (United States) Martina Navratilova	6–7, 4–6
Win	10.	9 October 1978	Minneapolis	Carpet (i)	(Australia) Kerry Melville Reid	(Australia) Lesley Hunt (South Africa) Ilana Kloss	6–3, 6–3
Loss	8.	6 November 1978	Clearwater	Hard	(Australia) Kerry Melville Reid	(United States) Martina Navratilova (United States) Anne Smith	6–7, 3–6
Loss	9.	14 November 1978	Palm Springs	Hard	(Australia) Kerry Melville Reid	(United States) Billie Jean King (United States) Martina Navratilova	3–6, 4–6
Win	11.	4 December 1978	Sydney	Grass	(Australia) Kerry Melville Reid	(New Zealand) Judy Chaloner (United Kingdom) Anne Hobbs	6–2, 4–6, 6–2
Loss	10.	22 January 1979	Hollywood	Carpet (i)	(United States) Rosie Casals	(United States) Tracy Austin (Netherlands) Betty Stöve	2–6, 6–2, 2–6
Win	12.	19 February 1979	Detroit	Carpet (i)	(Netherlands) Betty Stöve	(United Kingdom) Sue Barker (United States) Ann Kiyomura	6–4, 7–6^{(7–5)}
Win	13.	12 March 1979	Boston	Carpet (i)	(Australia) Kerry Melville Reid	(United Kingdom) Sue Barker (United States) Ann Kiyomura	6–4, 6–2
Win	14.	7 May 1979	Rome	Clay	(Netherlands) Betty Stöve	(Australia) Evonne Goolagong (Australia) Kerry Melville Reid	6–3, 6–4
Win	15.	21 May 1979	Berlin	Clay	(United States) Rosie Casals	(Australia) Evonne Goolagong (Australia) Kerry Melville Reid	6–2, 7–5
Win	16.	28 May 1979	French Open	Clay	(Netherlands) Betty Stöve	(France) Françoise Dürr (United Kingdom) Virginia Wade	2–6, 7–5, 6–4
Win	17.	11 June 1979	Chichester	Grass	(South Africa) Greer Stevens	(United States) Billie Jean King (United States) Martina Navratilova	6–3, 1–6, 7–5
Win	18.	18 June 1979	Eastbourne	Grass	(Netherlands) Betty Stöve	(South Africa) Ilana Kloss (United States) Betty Ann Stuart	6–2, 6–2
Loss	11.	25 June 1979	Wimbledon	Grass	(Netherlands) Betty Stöve	(United States) Billie Jean King (United States) Martina Navratilova	7–5, 3–6, 2–6
Win	19.	13 August 1979	Richmond	Carpet (i)	(Netherlands) Betty Stöve	(United States) Billie Jean King (United States) Martina Navratilova	6–1, 6–4
Win	20.	27 August 1979	US Open	Hard	(Netherlands) Betty Stöve	(United States) Billie Jean King (United States) Martina Navratilova	7–5, 6–3
Win	21.	24 September 1979	Atlanta	Carpet (i)	(Netherlands) Betty Stöve	(United States) Ann Kiyomura (United States) Anne Smith	6–2, 6–4
Loss	12.	1 October 1979	Minneapolis	Carpet (i)	(Netherlands) Betty Stöve	(United States) Billie Jean King (United States) Martina Navratilova	4–6, 6–7
Win	22.	8 October 1979	Phoenix	Hard	(Netherlands) Betty Stöve	(United States) Rosie Casals (United States) Chris Evert-Lloyd	6–4, 7–6
Win	23.	29 October 1979	Stockholm	Carpet (i)	(Netherlands) Betty Stöve	(United States) Billie Jean King (South Africa) Ilana Kloss	7–5, 7–6
Loss	13.	5 November 1979	Filderstadt	Carpet (i)	(Netherlands) Betty Stöve	(United States) Billie Jean King (United States) Martina Navratilova	3–6, 3–6
Win	24.	26 November 1979	Melbourne	Grass	(United States) Billie Jean King	(Australia) Dianne Fromholtz (United States) Anne Smith	6–3, 6–3
Win	25.	3 December 1979	Sydney	Grass	(United States) Billie Jean King	(United Kingdom) Sue Barker (United States) Pam Shriver	7–5, 6–4
Win	26.	28 January 1980	Seattle	Carpet (i)	(United States) Rosie Casals	(South Africa) Greer Stevens (United Kingdom) Virginia Wade	6–4, 2–6, 7–5
Loss	14.	25 February 1980	Houston	Carpet (i)	(Netherlands) Betty Stöve	(United States) Billie Jean King (South Africa) Ilana Kloss	6–3, 1–6, 4–6
Loss	15.	3 March 1980	Dallas	Carpet (i)	(United States) Rosie Casals	(United States) Billie Jean King (United States) Martina Navratilova	6–4, 3–6, 3–6
Win	27.	10 March 1980	Boston	Carpet (i)	(United States) Rosie Casals	(United States) Billie Jean King (South Africa) Ilana Kloss	6–4, 7–6
Loss	16.	19 March 1980	Avon Championships	Carpet (i)	(United States) Rosie Casals	(United States) Billie Jean King (United States) Martina Navratilova	3–6, 6–4, 3–6
Loss	17.	9 June 1980	Chichester	Grass	(United States) Rosie Casals	(United States) Pam Shriver (Netherlands) Betty Stöve	4–6, 5–7
Loss	18.	23 June 1980	Wimbledon	Grass	(United States) Rosie Casals	(United States) Kathy Jordan (United States) Anne Smith	6–4, 5–7, 1–6
Loss	19.	28 July 1980	San Diego	Hard	(United States) Rosie Casals	(United States) Tracy Austin (United States) Ann Kiyomura	6–3, 4–6, 3–6
Win	28.	3 November 1980	Hong Kong	Clay	(United States) Sharon Walsh	(United States) Penny Johnson (Chile) Silvana Urroz	6–1, 6–2
Loss	20.	1 December 1980	Sydney	Grass	(United States) Rosie Casals	(United States) Pam Shriver (Netherlands) Betty Stöve	1–6, 6–4, 4–6
Win	29.	7 January 1981	Washington	Carpet (i)	(United States) Rosie Casals	(United States) Candy Reynolds (United States) Paula Smith	6–3, 4–6, 7–6
Loss	21.	12 January 1981	Kansas City	Carpet (i)	(United States) Rosie Casals	(United States) Barbara Potter (United States) Sharon Walsh	2–6, 6–7^{(4–7)}
Win	30.	2 February 1981	Detroit	Carpet (i)	(United States) Rosie Casals	(Czechoslovakia) Hana Mandlíková (Netherlands) Betty Stöve	6–4, 6–2
Win	31.	9 February 1981	Oakland	Carpet (i)	(United States) Rosie Casals	(United States) Martina Navratilova (United Kingdom) Virginia Wade	6–1, 6–4
Win	32.	23 February 1981	Seattle	Carpet (i)	(United States) Rosie Casals	(United Kingdom) Sue Barker (United States) Ann Kiyomura	6–1, 6–4
Win	33.	6 April 1981	Hilton Head Island	Clay	(United States) Rosie Casals	(Socialist Federal Republic of Yugoslavia) Mima Jaušovec (United States) Pam Shriver	7–5, 7–5
Loss	22.	27 April 1981	Orlando	Clay	(United States) Rosie Casals	(United States) Martina Navratilova (United States) Pam Shriver	1–6, 6–7^{(10–12)}
Win	34.	24 August 1981	Mahwah	Hard	(United States) Rosie Casals	(United States) Candy Reynolds (Netherlands) Betty Stöve	6–2, 6–1
Loss	23.	31 August 1981	US Open	Hard	(United States) Rosie Casals	(United States) Kathy Jordan (United States) Anne Smith	3–6, 3–6
Loss	24.	28 September 1981	Minneapolis	Carpet (i)	(United States) Rosie Casals	(United States) Martina Navratilova (United States) Pam Shriver	4–6, 5–7
Win	35.	5 October 1981	Tampa	Hard	(United States) Rosie Casals	(United States) Martina Navratilova (Czechoslovakia) Renáta Tomanová	6–3, 6–4
Loss	25.	14 December 1981	East Rutherford	Carpet (i)	(United States) Rosie Casals	(United States) Martina Navratilova (United States) Pam Shriver	3–6, 4–6
Win	36.	18 January 1982	Seattle	Carpet (i)	(United States) Rosie Casals	(United States) Kathy Jordan (United States) Anne Smith	7–5, 6–4
Loss	26.	25 January 1982	Chicago	Carpet (i)	(United States) Rosie Casals	(United States) Martina Navratilova (United States) Pam Shriver	5–7, 4–6
Loss	27.	1 February 1982	Detroit	Carpet (i)	(United States) Rosie Casals	(United States) Leslie Allen (Socialist Federal Republic of Yugoslavia) Mima Jaušovec	4–6, 0–6
Loss	28.	15 March 1982	Boston	Carpet (i)	(United States) Rosie Casals	(United States) Kathy Jordan (United States) Anne Smith	6–7, 6–2, 4–6
Win	37.	3 April 1982	Palm Beach Gardens	Clay	(United States) Rosie Casals	(Australia) Evonne Goolagong (Netherlands) Betty Stöve	6–1, 7–6
Win	38.	26 April 1982	Orlando	Clay	(United States) Rosie Casals	(United States) Kathy Jordan (United States) Anne Smith	6–3, 6–3
Loss	29.	24 May 1982	French Open	Clay	(United States) Rosie Casals	(United States) Martina Navratilova (United States) Anne Smith	3–6, 4–6
Loss	30.	7 June 1982	Birmingham	Grass	(United States) Rosie Casals	(United Kingdom) Jo Durie (United Kingdom) Anne Hobbs	3–6, 2–6
Loss	31.	23 August 1982	Mahwah	Hard	(United States) Rosie Casals	(United States) Barbara Potter (United States) Sharon Walsh	1–6, 4–6
Win	39.	30 August 1982	US Open	Hard	(United States) Rosie Casals	(United States) Barbara Potter (United States) Sharon Walsh	6–4, 6–4
Win	40.	27 September 1982	Philadelphia	Carpet (i)	(United States) Rosie Casals	(United States) Barbara Potter (United States) Sharon Walsh	3–6, 7–6^{(7–5)}, 6–4
Loss	32.	4 October 1982	Deerfield Beach	Hard	(United States) Rosie Casals	(United States) Barbara Potter (United States) Sharon Walsh	6–7^{(5–7)}, 6–7^{(3–7)}
Loss	33.	22 January 1983	Marco Island	Clay	(United States) Rosie Casals	(United States) Andrea Jaeger (United States) Mary Lou Piatek	5–7, 4–6
Loss	34.	21 February 1983	Oakland	Carpet (i)	(United States) Rosie Casals	(West Germany) Claudia Kohde-Kilsch (West Germany) Eva Pfaff	4–6, 6–4, 4–6
Loss	35.	7 March 1983	Dallas	Carpet (i)	(United States) Rosie Casals	(United States) Martina Navratilova (United States) Pam Shriver	3–6, 2–6
Loss	36.	25 April 1983	Atlanta	Hard	(United States) Rosie Casals	(United States) Alycia Moulton (United States) Sharon Walsh	3–6, 6–7^{(1–7)}
Loss	37.	20 June 1983	Wimbledon	Grass	(United States) Rosie Casals	(United States) Martina Navratilova (United States) Pam Shriver	2–6, 2–6
Loss	38.	3 October 1983	Detroit	Carpet (i)	(United States) Rosie Casals	(United States) Kathy Jordan (United States) Barbara Potter	4–6, 1–6
Win	41.	14 November 1983	Brisbane	Grass	(United Kingdom) Anne Hobbs	(United States) Pam Shriver (United States) Sharon Walsh	6–3, 6–4
Win	42.	21 November 1983	Sydney	Grass	(United Kingdom) Anne Hobbs	(Czechoslovakia) Hana Mandlíková (Czechoslovakia) Helena Suková	6–4, 6–3
Loss	39.	28 November 1983	Australian Open	Grass	(United Kingdom) Anne Hobbs	(United States) Martina Navratilova (United States) Pam Shriver	4–6, 7–6, 2–6
Loss	40.	23 April 1984	Orlando	Clay	(United Kingdom) Anne Hobbs	(West Germany) Claudia Kohde-Kilsch (Czechoslovakia) Hana Mandlíková	0–6, 6–1, 3–6
Loss	41.	27 August 1984	US Open	Hard	(United Kingdom) Anne Hobbs	(United States) Martina Navratilova (United States) Pam Shriver	2–6, 4–6
Loss	42.	24 September 1984	New Orleans	Hard	(United States) Sharon Walsh	(United States) Martina Navratilova (United States) Pam Shriver	4–6, 1–6
Win	43.	1 October 1984	Los Angeles	Hard	(United States) Chris Evert-Lloyd	(West Germany) Bettina Bunge (West Germany) Eva Pfaff	6–2, 6–4
Loss	43.	19 November 1984	Sydney	Grass	(United States) Sharon Walsh	(West Germany) Claudia Kohde-Kilsch (Czechoslovakia) Helena Suková	2–6, 6–7^{(4–7)}
Win	44.	18 February 1985	Oakland	Carpet (i)	(Czechoslovakia) Hana Mandlíková	(South Africa) Rosalyn Fairbank (United States) Candy Reynolds	4–6, 7–5, 6–1
Win	45.	22 April 1985	San Diego	Hard	(United States) Candy Reynolds	(South Africa) Rosalyn Fairbank (Australia) Susan Leo	6–4, 6–0
Win	46.	15 July 1985	Newport	Grass	(United States) Chris Evert-Lloyd	(United States) Pam Shriver (Australia) Elizabeth Smylie	6–4, 7–6^{(7–2)}
Loss	44.	29 July 1985	Los Angeles	Hard	(Czechoslovakia) Hana Mandlíková	(West Germany) Claudia Kohde-Kilsch (Czechoslovakia) Helena Suková	4–6, 2–6
Win	47.	23 September 1985	New Orleans	Hard	(United States) Chris Evert-Lloyd	(United States) Mary Lou Piatek (United States) Anne White	6–1, 6–2
Win	48.	18 November 1985	Sydney	Grass	(Czechoslovakia) Hana Mandlíková	(South Africa) Rosalyn Fairbank (United States) Candy Reynolds	3–6, 7–6^{(7–5)}, 6–4
Loss	45.	10 February 1986	Boca West	Hard	(United States) Chris Evert-Lloyd	(United States) Pam Shriver (Czechoslovakia) Helena Suková	2–6, 3–6
Win	49.	24 February 1986	Oakland	Carpet (i)	(Czechoslovakia) Hana Mandlíková	(United States) Bonnie Gadusek (Czechoslovakia) Helena Suková	7–6^{(7–5)}, 6–1
Loss	46.	10 March 1986	Dallas	Carpet (i)	(Czechoslovakia) Hana Mandlíková	(West Germany) Claudia Kohde-Kilsch (Czechoslovakia) Helena Suková	6–4, 5–7, 4–6
Win	50.	17 March 1986	Virginia Slims Championships	Carpet (i)	(Czechoslovakia) Hana Mandlíková	(West Germany) Claudia Kohde-Kilsch (Czechoslovakia) Helena Suková	6–4, 6–7^{(4–7)}, 6–3
Win	51.	5 May 1986	Houston	Clay	(United States) Chris Evert-Lloyd	(United States) Elise Burgin (United States) JoAnne Russell	6–2, 6–4
Loss	47.	9 June 1986	Birmingham	Grass	(Australia) Elizabeth Smylie	(United States) Elise Burgin (South Africa) Rosalyn Fairbank	2–6, 4–6
Loss	48.	23 June 1986	Wimbledon	Grass	(Czechoslovakia) Hana Mandlíková	(United States) Martina Navratilova (United States) Pam Shriver	1–6, 3–6
Loss	49.	25 August 1986	US Open	Hard	(Czechoslovakia) Hana Mandlíková	(United States) Martina Navratilova (United States) Pam Shriver	4–6, 6–3, 3–6
Win	52.	29 December 1986	Brisbane	Grass	(Czechoslovakia) Hana Mandlíková	(United States) Betsy Nagelsen (Australia) Elizabeth Smylie	6–4, 6–3
Win	53.	9 February 1987	San Francisco	Carpet (i)	(Czechoslovakia) Hana Mandlíková	(United States) Zina Garrison (Argentina) Gabriela Sabatini	6–4, 7–6^{(7–4)}
Loss	50.	13 April 1987	Amelia Island	Clay	(Czechoslovakia) Hana Mandlíková	(West Germany) Steffi Graf (Argentina) Gabriela Sabatini	6–3, 3–6, 7–5
Win	54.	27 April 1987	Tampa	Clay	(United States) Chris Evert	(United States) Elise Burgin (South Africa) Rosalyn Fairbank	6–4, 6–3
Loss	51.	11 January 1988	Australian Open	Hard	(United States) Chris Evert	(United States) Martina Navratilova (United States) Pam Shriver	0–6, 5–7
Loss	52.	9 January 1989	Sydney	Hard	(Australia) Elizabeth Smylie	(United States) Martina Navratilova (United States) Pam Shriver	3–6, 3–6
Loss	53.	17 July 1989	Newport	Grass	(Australia) Elizabeth Smylie	(United States) Gigi Fernández (United States) Lori McNeil	3–6, 7–6^{(7–5)}, 5–7
Win	55.	7 August 1989	Los Angeles	Hard	(United States) Martina Navratilova	(United States) Mary Joe Fernández (West Germany) Claudia Kohde-Kilsch	5–2 ret.
Loss	54.	15 September 1989	Tokyo	Carpet (i)	(Australia) Elizabeth Smylie	(United States) Gigi Fernández (United States) Robin White	2–6, 2–6
Loss	55.	5 March 1990	Boca Raton	Hard	(United States) Elise Burgin	(Czechoslovakia) Jana Novotná (Czechoslovakia) Helena Suková	4–6, 2–6

== Grand Slam tournament timelines ==
Key
W	F	SF	QF	#R	RR	Q#	DNQ	A	NH

(W) winner; (F) finalist; (SF) semifinalist; (QF) quarterfinalist; (#R) rounds 4, 3, 2, 1; (RR) round-robin stage; (Q#) qualification round; (DNQ) did not qualify; (A) absent; (NH) not held; (SR) strike rate (events won / competed); (W–L) win–loss record.

=== Singles ===
Tournament	1970	1971	1972	1973	1974	1975	1976	1977		1978	1979	1980	1981	1982	1983	1984	1985	1986	1987	1988	1989	Career SR
Australian Open	2R	A	2R	3R	2R	3R	2R	A	A	A	A	F	SF	QF	QF	SF	3R	NH	4R	A	1R	0 / 14
French Open	A	LQ	A	1R	A	A	3R	A		A	F	QF	A	A	A	A	A	A	A	A	A	0 / 4
Wimbledon	A	A	1R	3R	2R	1R	3R	2R		4R	QF	QF	QF	4R	4R	4R	3R	1R	2R	1R	2R	0 / 18
US Open	A	A	A	A	A	A	1R	F		SF	3R	3R	3R	4R	3R	SF	4R	QF	2R	1R	A	0 / 13
SR	0 / 1	0 / 0	0 / 2	0 / 3	0 / 2	0 / 2	0 / 4	0 / 2		0 / 2	0 / 3	0 / 4	0 / 3	0 / 3	0 / 3	0 / 3	0 / 3	0 / 2	0 / 3	0 / 2	0 / 2	0 / 49
Year-end ranking						72	30	9		7	7	8	8	5	7	5	14	18	23	135	264	

=== Doubles ===
Tournament	1972	1973	1974	1975	1976	1977		1978	1979	1980	1981	1982	1983	1984	1985	1986	1987	1988	1989	1990	Career SR
Australian Open	QF	QF	2R	QF	SF	A	A	A	A	SF	SF	QF	F	SF	2R	NH	QF	F	QF	3R	0 / 15
French Open	A	1R	A	A	QF	A		A	W	QF	A	F	QF	A	A	SF	A	A	A	A	1 / 7
Wimbledon	2R	1R	A	3R	QF	1R		W	F	F	2R	SF	F	2R	SF	F	A	SF	3R	3R	1 / 17
US Open	A	A	A	1R	QF	3R		F	W	QF	F	W	QF	F	SF	F	3R	QF	2R	2R	2 / 16
SR	0 / 2	0 / 3	0 / 1	0 / 3	0 / 4	0 / 2		1 / 2	2 / 3	0 / 4	0 / 3	1 / 4	0 / 4	0 / 3	0 / 3	0 / 3	0 / 2	0 / 3	0 / 3	0 / 3	4 / 55
Year-end ranking														7	8	6	15	17	13	44	

=== Mixed doubles ===
Tournament	1972	1973	1974	1975	1976	1977		1978	1979	1980	1981	1982	1983	1984	1985	1986	1987	1988	1989	1990	Career SR
Australian Open	NH	NH	NH	NH	NH	NH	NH	NH	NH	NH	NH	NH	NH	NH	NH	NH	2R	1R	1R	1R	0 / 4
French Open	A	A	A	A	QF	A		A	W	A	A	W	SF	A	A	A	A	A	A	A	2 / 4
Wimbledon	2R	2R	A	1R	1R	A		3R	QF	SF	3R	F	W	W	QF	QF	1R	1R	2R	A	2 / 16
US Open	A	A	A	A	A	2R		SF	A	W	1R	A	SF	3R	SF	1R	1R	1R	1R	A	1 / 11
SR	0 / 1	0 / 1	0 / 0	0 / 1	0 / 2	0 / 1		0 / 2	1 / 2	1 / 2	0 / 2	1 / 2	1 / 3	1 / 2	0 / 2	0 / 2	0 / 3	0 / 3	0 / 3	0 / 1	5 / 35

- Note: The Australian Open was held twice in 1977, in January and December.

== See also ==
- Performance timelines for all female tennis players since 1978 who reached at least one Grand Slam final
