= 1981 Grand Marnier Tennis Games – Doubles =

Doubles
- 1981 Grand Marnier Tennis Games

Final
- Champions: (United States) Bruce Manson (United States) Brian Teacher
- Runners-up: (United States) Terry Moor (United States) Eliot Teltscher
- Score: 7–6, 6–2

Details
- Draw: 32
- Seeds: 8

Events
Singles	Doubles
- Grand Marnier Tennis Games

Bruce Manson and Brian Teacher won in the final 7–6, 6–2 against Terry Moor and Eliot Teltscher.

== Seeds ==
1. n/a
2. (United States) Marty Riessen / (United States) Sherwood Stewart (quarterfinals)
3. (United States) Bruce Manson / (United States) Brian Teacher (champions)
4. (Zimbabwe) Andrew Pattison / (United States) Butch Walts (second round)
5. (United States) Brian Gottfried / (United States) Dick Stockton (second round)
6. (United States) Fritz Buehning / (United States) Ferdi Taygan (first round)
7. (United States) Terry Moor / (United States) Eliot Teltscher (final)
8. (South Africa) Johan Kriek / (South Africa) Bernard Mitton (second round)

== Draw ==
Key

- Q = Qualifier
- WC = Wild card
- LL = Lucky loser
- Alt = Alternate
- ITF = ITF entry
- PR = Protected ranking
- SR = Special ranking
- SE = Special exempt
- JE = Junior exempt
- JR = Junior Accelerator Programme entrant
- CO = College Accelerator Programme entrant
- NG = Next Gen Accelerator Program entrant
- w/o = Walkover
- r = Retired
- d = Defaulted

=== Final ===
Semifinals
(West Germany) Rolf Gehring (United States) Hank Pfister	0	4
7	(United States) Terry Moor (United States) Eliot Teltscher	6	6
3	(United States) Bruce Manson (United States) Brian Teacher	6	6
(United States) Mel Purcell (United States) Peter Rennert	1	4

Final
7	(United States) Terry Moor (United States) Eliot Teltscher	6	2
3	(United States) Bruce Manson (United States) Brian Teacher	7	6

=== Top half ===
First round
LL	(United States) T Delatte (United States) T Garcia	1	6	7
(West Germany) K Meiler (West Germany) W Popp	6	3	6
(Australia) R Case (Australia) P Dent	6	6	7
(United States) M Davis (United States) C Dunk	4	7	6
(Australia) S Ball (United Kingdom) J Lloyd	6	6
(United States) J Austin (United States) T Gullikson	2	3
(West Germany) R Gehring (United States) H Pfister	6	6
6	(United States) F Buehning (United States) F Taygan	3	3
4	(Zimbabwe) A Pattison (United States) B Walts	7	6
(Australia) D Graham (United States) B Nichols	6	3
(Australia) R Frawley (Czechoslovakia) T Šmíd	7	6
(Australia) S Docherty (United States) G Fritz	5	4
(United States) B Martin (New Zealand) R Simpson	6	6	6
(France) C Freyss (France) C Roger-Vasselin	7	2	4
(United States) G Hardie (South Africa) R Moore	4	3
7	(United States) T Moor (United States) E Teltscher	6	6

Second round
LL	(United States) T Delatte (United States) T Garcia	6	6
(Australia) R Case (Australia) P Dent	1	4
(Australia) S Ball (United Kingdom) J Lloyd	2	5
(West Germany) R Gehring (United States) H Pfister	6	7
4	(Zimbabwe) A Pattison (United States) B Walts	6	6	6
(Australia) R Frawley (Czechoslovakia) T Šmíd	4	7	7
(United States) B Martin (New Zealand) R Simpson	3	6
7	(United States) T Moor (United States) E Teltscher	6	7

Quarterfinals
LL	(United States) T Delatte (United States) T Garcia	6	4
(West Germany) R Gehring (United States) H Pfister	7	6
(Australia) R Frawley (Czechoslovakia) T Šmíd	3	4
7	(United States) T Moor (United States) E Teltscher	6	6

Semifinals
(West Germany) R Gehring (United States) H Pfister	0	4
7	(United States) T Moor (United States) E Teltscher	6	6

=== Bottom half ===
First round
5	(United States) B Gottfried (United States) D Stockton	2	7	7
(France) Y Noah (France) P Portes	6	6	5
(United States) B Kleege (United States) W Redondo	6	6
(Spain) J Higueras (Spain) J López-Maeso	4	4
(United States) P Du Pré (Australia) K Warwick	6	3	6
(United States) J Hayes (United States) R Meyer	4	6	2
(United States) M Estep (Australia) P Kronk	6	1	3
3	(United States) B Manson (United States) B Teacher	3	6	6
8	(South Africa) J Kriek (South Africa) B Mitton	6	6
(United States) B Maze (United States) L Stefanki	4	3
(United States) M Purcell (United States) P Rennert	6	6
(Finland) L Palin (United States) R Van't Hof	2	3
(South Africa) E Edwards (South Africa) C Edwards	6	6
(Australia) J Cooper (United States) C Pasarell	1	4
(United States) G Malin (United States) D Siegler	3	3
2	(United States) M Riessen (United States) S Stewart	6	6

Second round
5	(United States) B Gottfried (United States) D Stockton	6	6	4
(United States) B Kleege (United States) W Redondo	3	7	6
(United States) P Du Pré (Australia) K Warwick	3	2
3	(United States) B Manson (United States) B Teacher	6	6
8	(South Africa) J Kriek (South Africa) B Mitton	3	4
(United States) M Purcell (United States) P Rennert	6	6
(South Africa) E Edwards (South Africa) C Edwards	1	4
2	(United States) M Riessen (United States) S Stewart	6	6

Quarterfinals
(United States) B Kleege (United States) W Redondo	6	6
3	(United States) B Manson (United States) B Teacher	7	7
(United States) M Purcell (United States) P Rennert	3	7	7
2	(United States) M Riessen (United States) S Stewart	6	6	5

Semifinals
3	(United States) B Manson (United States) B Teacher	6	6
(United States) M Purcell (United States) P Rennert	1	4
