= Brad Rowe (tennis) =

American tennis player

- Full name: Bradley Rowe
- Country (sports): United States
- Born: November 20, 1955 (age 70) Modesto, California; United States
- Plays: Right-handed

Singles
- Career record: 2–4
- Career titles: 0

Grand Slam singles results
- French Open: 2R (1979)

Doubles
- Career record: 14–17
- Career titles: 0

Grand Slam doubles results
- French Open: 1R (1979)
- Wimbledon: 1R (1979)
- US Open: 1R (1978)

Bradley Rowe (born November 20, 1955) is a former professional tennis player from the United States.

== Biography ==
Rowe played on the Grand Prix tennis circuit between 1977 and 1979, predominantly featuring in doubles tournaments. He was runner-up in three Grand Prix events with San Jose State University teammate Hank Pfister, in San Jose and Hong Kong in 1978, then San Jose once more in 1979.

He qualified for the main singles draw of a Grand Slam tournament for the only time at the 1979 French Open. In the first round he defeated Paul Kronk, before being eliminated in the second round by eventual semi-finalist Vitas Gerulaitis.

Presently, Rowe is working as a tennis coach in California's Conejo Valley.

== Grand Prix career finals ==
=== Doubles: 3 (0–3) ===
Result	W/L	Date	Tournament	Surface	Partner	Opponents	Score
Loss	0–1	Apr 1978	San Jose, U.S.	Carpet	(United States) Hank Pfister	(United States) Gene Mayer (United States) Sandy Mayer	3–6, 4–6
Loss	0–2	Nov 1978	Hong Kong	Hard	(United States) Hank Pfister	(Australia) Mark Edmondson (Australia) John Marks	7–5, 6–7, 1–6
Loss	0–3	Apr 1979	San Jose, U.S.	Carpet	(United States) Hank Pfister	(United States) Peter Fleming (United States) John McEnroe	3–6, 4–6
