= Éric Deblicker =

French tennis player

- Country (sports): France
- Born: 17 April 1952 (age 72); Neuilly-sur-Seine, Hauts-de-Seine
- Plays: Right-handed

Singles
- Career record: 65–89
- Career titles: 0
- Highest ranking: No. 65 (1 May 1978)

Grand Slam singles results
- French Open: 3R (1977)
- Wimbledon: 2R (1974, 1978)
- US Open: 1R (1976, 1977)

Doubles
- Career record: 37–59
- Career titles: 0
- Highest ranking: No. 123 (12 December 1976)

Grand Slam doubles results
- French Open: 3R (1975, 1977)
- Wimbledon: 2R (1976)

Éric Deblicker (born 17 April 1952) is a former tennis player and coach from France.

Deblicker reached a career-high singles ranking of world No. 76, in June 1976. He was captain of the French Davis Cup team before Patrice Dominguez.

Deblicker has coached prominent French tennis players, such as Sébastien Grosjean, Arnaud Clément, Paul-Henri Mathieu and Richard Gasquet.

His wife Nicole died in the 1989 terrorist bombing of Brazzaville-Paris UTA Flight 772. He recounts his grief and his career in an autobiography he wrote with his son, published in 2007. On 20 February 2017, he was appointed advisor to the new president of the French Tennis Federation.
