= 1979 French Open =

- Date: 28 May – 10 June
- Edition: 78
- Category: 49th Grand Slam (ITF)
- Prize money: $375,000
- Surface: Clay / outdoor
- Location: Paris (XVI^{e}), France
- Venue: Stade Roland Garros

Champions

Men's singles
- (Sweden) Björn Borg

Women's singles
- (United States) Chris Evert

Men's doubles
- (United States) Gene Mayer / (United States) Sandy Mayer

Women's doubles
- (Netherlands) Betty Stöve / (Australia) Wendy Turnbull

Mixed doubles
- (Australia) Wendy Turnbull / (Australia) Bob Hewitt
← 1978 ·	French Open	· 1980 →

The 1979 French Open was a tennis tournament that took place on the outdoor clay courts at the Stade Roland Garros in Paris, France. The tournament ran from 28 May until 10 June. It was the 78th staging of the French Open, and the first Grand Slam tennis event of 1979.

== Finals ==
=== Men's singles ===
(Sweden) Björn Borg defeated (Paraguay) Víctor Pecci, 6–3, 6–1, 6–7^{(6–8)}, 6–4

- It was Borg's 7th career Grand Slam title, and his 4th French Open title.

=== Women's singles ===
(United States) Chris Evert-Lloyd defeated (Australia) Wendy Turnbull, 6–2, 6–0

- It was Evert's 9th career Grand Slam title, and her 3rd French Open title.

=== Men's doubles ===
(United States) Gene Mayer / (United States) Sandy Mayer defeated (Australia) Ross Case / (United States) Phil Dent, 6–4, 6–4, 6–4

=== Women's doubles ===
(Netherlands) Betty Stöve / (Australia) Wendy Turnbull defeated (France) Françoise Dürr / (United Kingdom) Virginia Wade, 3–6, 7–5, 6–4

=== Mixed doubles ===
(Australia) Wendy Turnbull / (South Africa) Bob Hewitt defeated (Romania) Virginia Ruzici / (Romania) Ion Țiriac, 6–3, 2–6, 6–1

== Prize money ==
Event		W	F	SF	QF	4R	3R	2R	1R
Singles	Men	FF208,200	FF104,100	FF52,050	FF26,370	FF15,270	FF8,325	FF4,860	FF2,775
Singles	Women	FF126,900	FF63,450	FF31,300	FF13,960	-	FF6,870	FF3,600	FF696

Total prize money for the event was FF2,050,012.

Preceded by 1978 Australian Open	Grand Slams	Succeeded by 1979 Wimbledon Championships
