= Bruce Manson =

American tennis player

- Country (sports): United States
- Residence: New York City, New York
- Born: March 20, 1956 (age 70) Los Angeles, California, US
- Height: 5 ft 8 in (1.73 m)
- Turned pro: 1977
- Retired: 1985
- Plays: Left-handed
- Prize money: $492,338

Singles
- Career record: 126–171
- Career titles: 0
- Highest ranking: No. 39 (August 16, 1982)

Grand Slam singles results
- French Open: 3R (1979, 1980)
- Wimbledon: 3R (1979, 1980)
- US Open: QF (1981)

Doubles
- Career record: 212–160
- Career titles: 9
- Highest ranking: No. 17 (March 23, 1981)

Grand Slam doubles results
- French Open: SF (1980)
- Wimbledon: 3R (1985)
- US Open: QF (1979)

Bruce Manson (born March 20, 1956) is an American former professional tennis player. He achieved a career-high doubles ranking of world No. 17 in 1981. His career high singles ranking was World No. 39, but he did, when ranked 112, defeat world number 1 Björn Borg in 1979 at the Tennis Games Tournament at Mission Hills Country Club.

== Biography ==
Manson is Jewish, and was born in Los Angeles, California, and lived in North Hollywood. He attended Grant High School. He was the first player to win three consecutive L.A. City Tennis Singles Championships (1973–75). He won the boys 16 and under in the Ojai Tennis Tournament in 1972. He was the Southern California Junior Singles Champion in both 1973 and 1974, and was a member of the U.S. Junior Davis Cup Team.

At the University of Southern California on a tennis scholarship, Manson was a three-time All-American (1975–77). He was an NCAA Singles semi-finalist in both 1976 and 1977, and doubles champion in 1975 and 1977. While at USC, Manson won a gold medal in doubles at the 1975 Pan American Games. In 1977, he won the 21-and-under U.S. Singles title.

Manson enjoyed most of his tennis success while playing doubles. During his career he won 9 doubles titles and finished runner-up an additional 8 times. He achieved a career-high doubles ranking of World No. 17 in 1981. His career high singles ranking was World No. 39. He was a member of the 1980 U.S. Davis Cup Team, and made the U.S. Open quarter-finals in 1981 by defeating Danny Saltz, Richard Meyer, Peter McNamara and José Luis Clerc, before being defeated by Vitas Gerulaitis.

In 1993 he was inducted into the Southern California Jewish Sports Hall of Fame.

After retiring from tennis in 1985, he earned an MBA from the Wharton School of the University of Pennsylvania in 1987, and began a career as a bond trader with First Boston in 1987 in New York. He moved to London in 1988, working for CSFB and later Barclays Bank, returned to New York in 1993 with Barclays, and moved to HSBC Bank in 2004.

== Career finals ==
=== Singles: 1 (1 runner-up) ===
| Result | W-L | Date | Tournament | Surface | Opponent | Score |
|---|---|---|---|---|---|---|
| Loss | 0–1 | Mar 1980 | Dayton, US | Carpet | (Poland) Wojciech Fibak | 6–7, 3–6 |

=== Doubles: 17 (9 titles / 8 runner-ups) ===
| Result | W-L | Date | Tournament | Surface | Partner | Opponents | Score |
|---|---|---|---|---|---|---|---|
| Loss | 0–1 | Feb 1976 | Boca Raton, US | Hard | (United States) Butch Walts | (United States) Vitas Gerulaitis (United States) Clark Graebner | 2–6, 4–6 |
| Loss | 0–2 | Aug 1978 | Cleveland, US | Hard | (United States) Rick Fisher | (United States) Dick Stockton (United States) Erik van Dillen | 1–6, 4–6 |
| Loss | 0–3 | Oct 1978 | Basel, Switzerland | Hard (i) | (Rhodesia) Andrew Pattison | (Poland) Wojciech Fibak (United States) John McEnroe | 6–7, 5–7 |
| Win | 1–3 | Nov 1978 | Paris Indoor, France | Hard (i) | (Rhodesia) Andrew Pattison | (Romania) Ion Țiriac (Argentina) Guillermo Vilas | 7–6, 6–2 |
| Loss | 1–4 | Feb 1979 | Rancho Mirage, US | Hard | (South Africa) Cliff Drysdale | (United States) Gene Mayer (United States) Sandy Mayer | 4–6, 6–7 |
| Win | 2–4 | Apr 1979 | Dayton, US | Carpet | (South Africa) Cliff Drysdale | (Australia) Ross Case (Australia) Phil Dent | 3–6, 6–3, 7–6 |
| Win | 3–4 | Aug 1980 | Toronto, Canada | Hard | (United States) Brian Teacher | (Switzerland) Heinz Günthardt (United States) Sandy Mayer | 6–3, 3–6, 6–4 |
| Win | 4–4 | Aug 1980 | Cincinnati, US | Hard | (United States) Brian Teacher | (Poland) Wojciech Fibak (Czechoslovakia) Ivan Lendl | 6–7, 7–5, 6–4 |
| Loss | 4–5 | Nov 1980 | Hong Kong | Hard | (United States) Brian Teacher | (United States) Peter Fleming (United States) Ferdi Taygan | 5–7, 2–6 |
| Win | 5–5 | Nov 1980 | Taipei, Taiwan | Carpet | (United States) Brian Teacher | (United States) John Austin (United States) Ferdi Taygan | 6–4, 6–0 |
| Win | 6–5 | Feb 1981 | La Quinta, US | Hard | (United States) Brian Teacher | (United States) Terry Moor (United States) Eliot Teltscher | 7–6, 6–2 |
| Loss | 6–6 | May 1981 | Rome, Italy | Clay | (Czechoslovakia) Tomáš Šmíd | (Chile) Hans Gildemeister (Ecuador) Andrés Gómez | 5–7, 2–6 |
| Win | 7–6 | Aug 1981 | Columbus, US | Hard | (United States) Brian Teacher | (India) Anand Amritraj (India) Vijay Amritraj | 6–1, 6–1 |
| Loss | 7–7 | Apr 1982 | Los Angeles, US | Hard | (United States) Brian Teacher | (United States) Sherwood Stewart (United States) Ferdi Taygan | 1–6, 7–6, 3–6 |
| Win | 8–7 | Jul 1982 | Zell Am See WCT, Austria | Clay | (Poland) Wojciech Fibak | (United States) Sammy Giammalva Jr. (United States) Tony Giammalva | 6–7, 6–4, 6–4 |
| Win | 9–7 | Nov 1982 | Paris Indoor, France | Hard (i) | (United States) Brian Gottfried | (United States) Jay Lapidus (United States) Richard Meyer | 6–4, 6–2 |
| Loss | 9–8 | Dec 1982 | Chicago-2 WCT, US | Carpet | (United States) Mike Cahill | (India) Anand Amritraj (India) Vijay Amritraj | 6–3, 2–6, 3–6 |

== See also ==
- List of select Jewish tennis players
