= Gene Mayer =

American tennis player

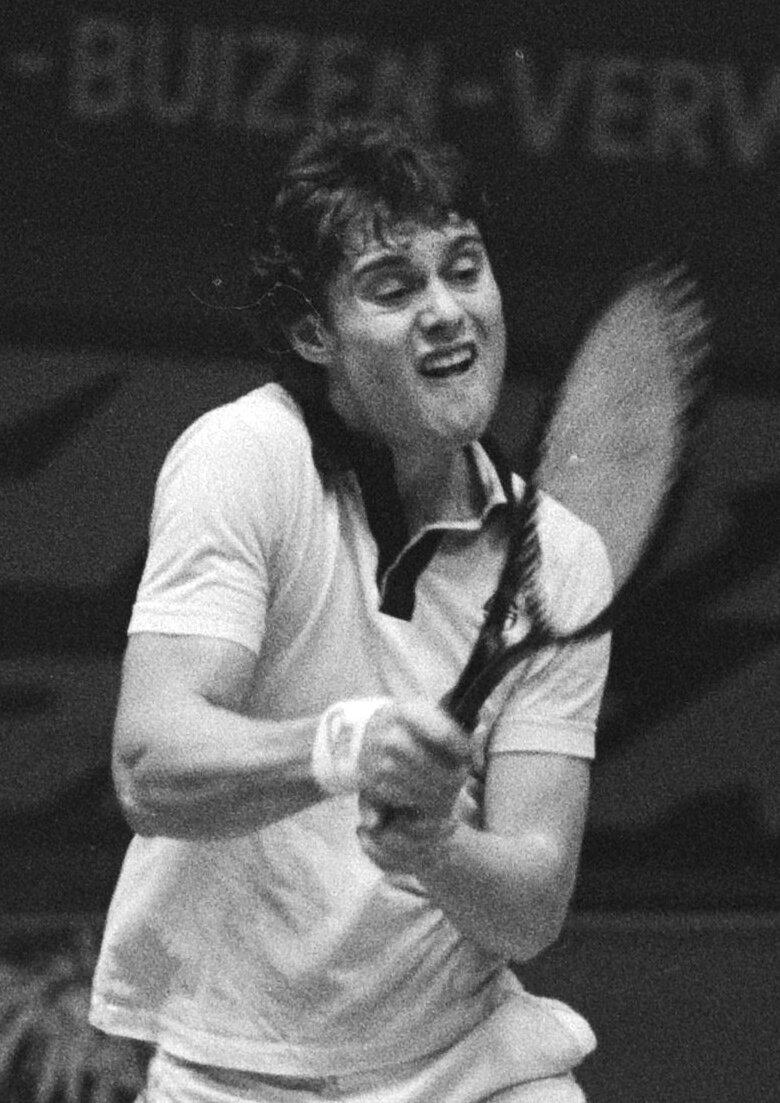
- Gene Mayer at the 1979 ABN Tennis Tournament
- Country (sports): United States
- Residence: Mill Neck, New York, U.S.
- Born: May 11, 1956 (age 70) Flushing, Queens, New York, U.S.
- Height: 6 ft 0 in (1.83 m)
- Turned pro: 1973
- Retired: 1986 (brief comeback in 2001)
- Plays: Right-handed (two-handed both sides)
- Prize money: $1,382,422

Singles
- Career record: 317–158
- Career titles: 14
- Highest ranking: No. 4 (October 6, 1980)

Grand Slam singles results
- French Open: 4R (1979)
- Wimbledon: QF (1980, 1982)
- US Open: QF (1982, 1984)

Other tournaments
- Tour Finals: SF (1980)
- WCT Finals: QF (1979)

Doubles
- Career record: 167–91
- Career titles: 15
- Highest ranking: No. 5 (July 9, 1979)

Grand Slam doubles results
- French Open: W (1978, 1979)

Gene Mayer (born May 11, 1956) is a former tennis player from the United States who won 14 professional singles titles during his career.

Mayer was born in Flushing, Queens, New York. He grew up in Wayne, New Jersey, and played tennis at Wayne Valley High School, where he went unbeaten in his two years on the tennis team. He was a double hander on both forehand and backhand.

The right-hander Mayer reached his highest ranking on the ATP Tour on October 6, 1980, when he reached the rank of world No. 4.

Mayer has been a resident of Woodmere, New York. In 2005, he was inducted into the Nassau County Sports Hall of Fame.

Gene's older brother Sandy was also a tour player. He achieved the rank of world No. 7 in 1982. They met each other in the Stockholm Open final 1981 and won 5 doubles tournaments together, including 1979 French Open.

== Career finals ==
=== Singles: 26 (14 wins, 12 losses) ===
Result	W/L	Date	Tournament	Surface	Opponent	Score
Loss	0–1	Sep 1976	Hamilton, Bermuda	Clay	(United States) Cliff Richey	6–7, 2–6
Win	1–1	Apr 1978	Guadalajara, Mexico	Clay	(Australia) John Newcombe	6–3, 6–4
Loss	1–2	Apr 1979	Houston, U.S.	Clay	(Spain) José Higueras	3–6, 6–2, 6–7
Win	2–2	Nov 1979	Cologne, Germany	Hard (i)	(Poland) Wojtek Fibak	6–3, 3–6, 6–1
Loss	2–3	Nov 1979	Stockholm, Sweden	Hard (i)	(United States) John McEnroe	7–6, 3–6, 3–6
Win	3–3	Feb 1980	Denver, U.S.	Carpet	(United States) Victor Amaya	6–2, 6–2
Loss	3–4	Mar 1980	Rotterdam, Netherlands	Carpet	(Switzerland) Heinz Günthardt	2–6, 4–6
Win	4–4	Mar 1980	Metz, France	Carpet	(Italy) Gianni Ocleppo	6–3, 6–3, 6–0
Win	5–4	Apr 1980	Los Angeles, U.S.	Hard	(United States) Brian Teacher	6–3, 6–2
Loss	5–5	Jul 1980	Boston, U.S.	Clay	(United States) Eddie Dibbs	2–6, 1–6
Win	6–5	Aug 1980	Cleveland, U.S.	Hard	(United States) Victor Amaya	6–2, 6–1
Win	7–5	Sep 1980	San Francisco, U.S.	Carpet	(United States) Eliot Teltscher	6–2, 2–6, 6–1
Loss	7–6	Nov 1980	Wembley, United Kingdom	Carpet	(United States) John McEnroe	4–6, 3–6, 3–6
Win	8–6	Feb 1981	Memphis, U.S.	Carpet	(United States) Roscoe Tanner	6–2, 6–4
Win	9–6	Mar 1981	Denver, U.S.	Carpet	(United States) John Sadri	6–4, 6–4
Loss	9–7	Mar 1981	Rotterdam, Netherlands	Hard (i)	(United States) Jimmy Connors	1–6, 6–2, 2–6
Win	10–7	Aug 1981	Cleveland, U.S.	Hard	(United States) Dave Siegler	6–1, 6–4
Win	11–7	Nov 1981	Stockholm, Sweden	Hard (i)	(United States) Sandy Mayer	6–4, 6–2
Loss	11–8	Apr 1982	Las Vegas, U.S.	Hard	(United States) Jimmy Connors	2–5, retired
Win	12–8	May 1982	Munich, Germany	Clay	(West Germany) Peter Elter	3–6, 6–3, 6–2, 6–1
Loss	12–9	Oct 1982	Sydney Indoor, Australia	Hard (i)	(United States) John McEnroe	4–6, 1–6, 4–6
Loss	12–10	Feb 1983	Memphis, U.S.	Carpet	(United States) Jimmy Connors	5–7, 0–6
Win	13–10	Mar 1983	Rotterdam, Netherlands	Hard (i)	(Argentina) Guillermo Vilas	6–1, 7–6
Win	14–10	Apr 1983	Los Angeles	Hard	(United States) Johan Kriek	7–6, 6–1
Loss	14–11	May 1984	Munich, Germany	Clay	(Belgium) Libor Pimek	4–6, 6–4, 6–7, 4–6
Loss	14–12	Jul 1984	Stuttgart Outdoor, Germany	Clay	(France) Henri Leconte	6–7, 0–6, 6–1, 1–6

=== Doubles: 24 (15 wins, 9 losses) ===
Result	W/L	Date	Tournament	Surface	Partner	Opponents	Score
Loss	0–1	Mar 1976	La Costa, U.S.	Hard	(United States) Peter Fleming	(United States) Marty Riessen (United States) Roscoe Tanner	6–7, 6–7
Loss	0–2	1976	Charlotte WCT, U.S.	Carpet	(United States) Vitas Gerulaitis	(Australia) John Newcombe (Australia) Tony Roche	3–6, 5–7
Loss	0–3	1977	Columbus, U.S.	Clay	(United States) Peter Fleming	(United States) Robert Lutz (United States) Stan Smith	6–4, 5–7, 2–6
Win	1–3	1978	Mexico City WCT, Mexico	Hard	(India) Sashi Menon	(Mexico) Marcello Lara (Mexico) Raúl Ramírez	6–3, 7–6
Win	2–3	1978	Miami, Florida, U.S.	Carpet	(United States) Tom Gullikson	(Australia) Bob Carmichael (United States) Brian Teacher	7–6, 6–3
Loss	2–4	1978	Guadalajara, Mexico	Clay	(India) Sashi Menon	(United States) Sandy Mayer (United States) Sherwood Stewart	6–4, 6–7, 3–6
Win	3–4	1978	San Jose, California, U.S.	Carpet	(United States) Sandy Mayer	(United States) Hank Pfister (United States) Brad Rowe	6–3, 6–4
Win	4–4	1978	French Open, Paris	Clay	(United States) Hank Pfister	(Spain) Manuel Orantes (Spain) José Higueras	6–3, 6–2, 6–2
Win	5–4	1978	Cincinnati, Ohio, U.S.	Clay	(Mexico) Raúl Ramírez	(Egypt) Ismail El Shafei (New Zealand) Brian Fairlie	6–3, 6–3
Win	6–4	1978	Indianapolis, Indiana, U.S.	Clay	(United States) Hank Pfister	(United States) Jeff Borowiak (New Zealand) Chris Lewis	6–3, 6–1
Win	7–4	1979	Rancho Mirage, California, U.S.	Hard	(United States) Sandy Mayer	(South Africa) Cliff Drysdale (United States) Bruce Manson	6–4, 7–6
Win	8–4	1979	Houston, U.S.	Clay	(United States) Sherwood Stewart	(Australia) John Alexander (Australia) Geoff Masters	6–1, 5–7, 6–4
Win	9–4	1979	French Open, Paris	Clay	(United States) Sandy Mayer	(Australia) Ross Case (Australia) Phil Dent	6–4, 6–4, 6–4
Loss	9–5	1979	Forest Hills WCT, U.S.	Clay	(United States) Sandy Mayer	(United States) Peter Fleming (United States) John McEnroe	7–6, 6–7, 3–6
Win	10–5	1979	Indianapolis, Indiana, U.S.	Clay	(United States) John McEnroe	(Czechoslovakia) Jan Kodeš (Czechoslovakia) Tomáš Šmíd	6–4, 7–6
Win	11–5	1979	Cologne, Germany	Hard (i)	(United States) Stan Smith	(Switzerland) Heinz Günthardt (Czechoslovakia) Pavel Složil	6–3, 6–4
Win	12–5	1980	Metz, France	Carpet	(Australia) Colin Dibley	(United States) Chris Delaney (Australia) Kim Warwick	7–6, 7–5
Loss	12–6	1980	Las Vegas, U.S.	Hard	(Poland) Wojtek Fibak	(United States) Robert Lutz (United States) Stan Smith	2–6, 5–7
Win	13–6	1980	Florence, Italy	Clay	(Mexico) Raúl Ramírez	(Italy) Paolo Bertolucci (Italy) Adriano Panatta	6–1, 6–4
Win	14–6	1980	Boston, U.S.	Clay	(United States) Sandy Mayer	(Chile) Hans Gildemeister (Ecuador) Andrés Gómez	1–6, 6–4, 6–4
Loss	14–7	1980	Washington, D.C., U.S.	Clay	(United States) Sandy Mayer	(Chile) Hans Gildemeister (Ecuador) Andrés Gómez	4–6, 5–7
Loss	14–8	1980	San Francisco, U.S.	Carpet	(United States) Sandy Mayer	(United States) Peter Fleming (United States) John McEnroe	1–6, 4–6
Win	15–8	1981	Memphis, U.S.	Carpet	(United States) Sandy Mayer	(United States) Mike Cahill (United States) Tom Gullikson	7–6, 6–7, 7–6
Loss	15–9	1981	Rotterdam, Netherlands	Hard (i)	(United States) Sandy Mayer	(United States) Fritz Buehning (United States) Ferdi Taygan	6–7, 6–1, 4–6
