= 1979 ATP Challenger Series =

Second tier tour for professional tennis organised by the ATP

Details
- Duration: 30 April 1979 – 9 December 1979
- Edition: 2nd
- Tournaments: 22

Achievements (singles)

The ATP Challenger Series is the second-tier tour for professional tennis organised by the Association of Tennis Professionals (ATP). The 1979 ATP Challenger Series calendar comprises 22 tournaments, with prize money ranging from $25,000 up to $40,000.

== Schedule ==
=== April ===
Week of	Tournament	Champions	Runners-up	Semifinalists	Quarterfinalists
April 2	No tournaments scheduled.				
April 9	No tournaments scheduled.				
April 16	No tournaments scheduled.				
April 23	No tournaments scheduled.				
April 30	Indian River Challenger; Indian River, United States; Clay – $25,000 – 64S/32D; Singles draw – Doubles draw	(United States) Billy Martin; 6–2, 6–0	(United States) Rick Fagel	(New Zealand) Chris Lewis (United States) George Hardie	(Australia) David Carter (Australia) Noel Phillips (United States) John Sadri (United States) Van Winitsky
April 30	Indian River Challenger; Indian River, United States; Clay – $25,000 – 64S/32D; Singles draw – Doubles draw	(South Africa) Kevin Curren (United States) Steve Denton; 6–4, 7–5	(South Africa) Pat Cramer (Australia) Cliff Letcher	(New Zealand) Chris Lewis (United States) George Hardie	(Australia) David Carter (Australia) Noel Phillips (United States) John Sadri (United States) Van Winitsky
April 30	Nagoya Challenger; Nagoya, Japan; Hard – $40,000 – 32S/16D; Singles draw – Doubles draw	(Australia) Rod Frawley; 2–6, 6–4, 6–3	(Mexico) Marcelo Lara	(Australia) Chris Kachel (Japan) Tsuyoshi Fukui	(Japan) Shigeyuki Nishio (United States) Joel Bailey (Australia) Charlie Fancutt (New Zealand) Onny Parun
April 30	Nagoya Challenger; Nagoya, Japan; Hard – $40,000 – 32S/16D; Singles draw – Doubles draw	(United States) Joel Bailey (Australia) Rod Frawley; 7–6, 7–5	(Australia) Chris Kachel (Mexico) Marcelo Lara	(Australia) Chris Kachel (Japan) Tsuyoshi Fukui	(Japan) Shigeyuki Nishio (United States) Joel Bailey (Australia) Charlie Fancutt (New Zealand) Onny Parun
April 30	Parioli Challenger; Rome, Italy; Clay – $25,000 – 32S/16D; Singles draw – Doubles draw	(France) Dominique Bedel; 6–4, 7–5	(Italy) Corrado Barazzutti	(Argentina) Fernando Dalla Fontana (Australia) Kim Warwick	(France) Bernard Fritz (Australia) Phil Dent (Argentina) Ricardo Cano (Uruguay) José Luis Damiani
April 30	Parioli Challenger; Rome, Italy; Clay – $25,000 – 32S/16D; Singles draw – Doubles draw	(Australia) Dick Crealy (Australia) Phil Dent; 6–3, 3–6, 7–6	(Australia) Syd Ball (Australia) Kim Warwick	(Argentina) Fernando Dalla Fontana (Australia) Kim Warwick	(France) Bernard Fritz (Australia) Phil Dent (Argentina) Ricardo Cano (Uruguay) José Luis Damiani

=== May ===
Week of	Tournament	Champions	Runners-up	Semifinalists	Quarterfinalists
May 7	Cuneo Challenger; Cuneo, Italy; Clay – $25,000 – 32S/16D; Singles draw – Doubles draw	(Spain) Fernando Luna; 6–2, 6–2, 6–0	(France) Christophe Freyss	(France) Christophe Roger-Vasselin (Italy) Antonio Zugarelli	(Argentina) Carlos Gattiker (Uruguay) José Luis Damiani (France) Dominique Bedel (France) Bernard Fritz
May 7	Cuneo Challenger; Cuneo, Italy; Clay – $25,000 – 32S/16D; Singles draw – Doubles draw	(Chile) Alejandro Pierola (Chile) Belus Prajoux; 6–4, 7–6	(France) Dominique Bedel (France) Christophe Freyss	(France) Christophe Roger-Vasselin (Italy) Antonio Zugarelli	(Argentina) Carlos Gattiker (Uruguay) José Luis Damiani (France) Dominique Bedel (France) Bernard Fritz
May 7	Raleigh Challenger; Raleigh, United States; Clay – $25,000 – 64S/32D; Singles draw – Doubles draw	(United States) John Sadri; 6–7, 6–2, 7–5	(United States) Charles Owens	(New Zealand) Chris Lewis (Colombia) Iván Molina	(United States) Michael Grant (United States) Trey Waltke (Spain) Gabriel Urpí (United States) Howard Schoenfield
May 7	Raleigh Challenger; Raleigh, United States; Clay – $25,000 – 64S/32D; Singles draw – Doubles draw	(United States) John Austin (United States) Billy Martin; 6–2, 7–5	(New Zealand) Chris Lewis (Australia) Cliff Letcher	(New Zealand) Chris Lewis (Colombia) Iván Molina	(United States) Michael Grant (United States) Trey Waltke (Spain) Gabriel Urpí (United States) Howard Schoenfield
May 14	No tournaments scheduled.				
May 21	No tournaments scheduled.				
May 28	No tournaments scheduled.				

=== June ===
Week of	Tournament	Champions	Runners-up	Semifinalists	Quarterfinalists
June 4	Galatina Challenger; Galatina, Italy; Clay – $25,000 – 32S/16D; Singles draw – Doubles draw	(Spain) Miguel Mir; 6–1, 7–6	(Chile) Alejandro Pierola	(France) Christophe Casa (Ecuador) Andrés Gómez	(New Zealand) Onny Parun (Italy) Massimo Di Domenico (Spain) Javier Soler (Australia) Ernie Ewert
June 4	Galatina Challenger; Galatina, Italy; Clay – $25,000 – 32S/16D; Singles draw – Doubles draw	(Australia) Ernie Ewert (Australia) Cliff Letcher; 6–2, 6–2	(Argentina) Gustavo Guerrero (Chile) Alejandro Pierola	(France) Christophe Casa (Ecuador) Andrés Gómez	(New Zealand) Onny Parun (Italy) Massimo Di Domenico (Spain) Javier Soler (Australia) Ernie Ewert
June 4	Zell am See Challenger; Zell am See, Austria; Clay – $25,000 – 16S/8D; Singles draw – Doubles draw	(Brazil) Carlos Kirmayr; 6–7, 6–3, 6–4, 6–2	(Uruguay) José Luis Damiani	(West Germany) Karl Meiler (Australia) Kim Warwick	(Australia) Paul Kronk (Argentina) Ricardo Cano (United States) Billy Martin (South Africa) Deon Joubert
June 4	Zell am See Challenger; Zell am See, Austria; Clay – $25,000 – 16S/8D; Singles draw – Doubles draw	(Australia) Paul Kronk (Australia) Peter McNamara; 2–6, 6–0, 6–3	(Australia) David Carter (United States) Billy Martin	(West Germany) Karl Meiler (Australia) Kim Warwick	(Australia) Paul Kronk (Argentina) Ricardo Cano (United States) Billy Martin (South Africa) Deon Joubert
June 11	Montgomery Challenger; Montgomery, United States; Hard – $25,000 – 64S/32D; Singles draw – Doubles draw	(United States) Trey Waltke; 6–2, 4–6, 7–5	(United States) Vincent Van Patten	(United States) Mike Machette (United States) Charles Owens	(India) Sashi Menon (United States) Tom Leonard (United States) Christopher Lewis (United States) Keith Richardson
June 11	Montgomery Challenger; Montgomery, United States; Hard – $25,000 – 64S/32D; Singles draw – Doubles draw	(United States) Eric Friedler (United States) Erik van Dillen; 4–6, 6–3, 7–6	(United States) Tom Leonard (United States) Jerry Van Linge	(United States) Mike Machette (United States) Charles Owens	(India) Sashi Menon (United States) Tom Leonard (United States) Christopher Lewis (United States) Keith Richardson
June 18	Green Bay Challenger; Green Bay, United States; Hard – $25,000 – 64S/32D; Singles draw – Doubles draw	(United States) Vincent Van Patten; 6–4, 6–0	(United States) Fred McNair	(Australia) Rod Frawley (United States) Peter Rennert	(United States) Erik van Dillen (United States) Tom Leonard (United States) Steve Denton (United States) Jerry Van Linge
June 18	Green Bay Challenger; Green Bay, United States; Hard – $25,000 – 64S/32D; Singles draw – Doubles draw	(India) Sashi Menon (South Africa) Robert Trogolo; 7–5, 6–4	(United States) Tom Leonard (United States) Jerry Van Linge	(Australia) Rod Frawley (United States) Peter Rennert	(United States) Erik van Dillen (United States) Tom Leonard (United States) Steve Denton (United States) Jerry Van Linge
June 25	Concord Challenger; Concord, United States; Hard – $25,000 – 64S/32D; Singles draw – Doubles draw	(United States) Erik van Dillen; 6–7, 6–2, 6–3	(United States) Howard Schoenfield	(Australia) Warren Maher (United States) Bruce Kleege	(United States) Fred McNair (United States) Michael Grant (United States) Vincent Van Patten (New Zealand) Russell Simpson
June 25	Concord Challenger; Concord, United States; Hard – $25,000 – 64S/32D; Singles draw – Doubles draw	(India) Sashi Menon (South Africa) Robert Trogolo; 7–6^{(9–7)}, 6-4	(United States) Christopher Lewis (United States) Bruce Nichols	(Australia) Warren Maher (United States) Bruce Kleege	(United States) Fred McNair (United States) Michael Grant (United States) Vincent Van Patten (New Zealand) Russell Simpson

=== July ===
Week of	Tournament	Champions	Runners-up	Semifinalists	Quarterfinalists
July 2	San Diego Challenger; San Diego, United States; Hard – $25,000 – 64S/32D; Singles draw – Doubles draw	(United States) Trey Waltke; 4–6, 6–4, 6–0	(United States) Matt Mitchell	(Australia) Rod Frawley (New Zealand) Russell Simpson	(United States) Erik van Dillen (South Africa) Byron Bertram (South Africa) Robert Trogolo (United States) Gene Malin
July 2	San Diego Challenger; San Diego, United States; Hard – $25,000 – 64S/32D; Singles draw – Doubles draw	(India) Sashi Menon (South Africa) Robert Trogolo; 7–6, 6–1	(Australia) Rod Frawley (New Zealand) Russell Simpson	(Australia) Rod Frawley (New Zealand) Russell Simpson	(United States) Erik van Dillen (South Africa) Byron Bertram (South Africa) Robert Trogolo (United States) Gene Malin
July 9	No tournaments scheduled.				
July 16	No tournaments scheduled.				
July 23	Porto Alegre Challenger; Porto Alegre, Brazil; Clay – $25,000 – 64S/32D; Singles draw – Doubles draw	(Chile) Belus Prajoux; 6–2, 6–4	(Peru) Fernando Maynetto	(Argentina) Carlos Gattiker (Brazil) João Soares	(Bolivia) Ramiro Benavides (Argentina) Jorge Todero (Finland) Leo Palin (Brazil) Cássio Motta
July 23	Porto Alegre Challenger; Porto Alegre, Brazil; Clay – $25,000 – 64S/32D; Singles draw – Doubles draw	(Brazil) Marcos Hocevar (Brazil) João Soares; 6–1, 6–0	(Argentina) Lito Álvarez (Chile) Álvaro Fillol	(Argentina) Carlos Gattiker (Brazil) João Soares	(Bolivia) Ramiro Benavides (Argentina) Jorge Todero (Finland) Leo Palin (Brazil) Cássio Motta
July 30	Salvador Challenger; Salvador, Brazil; Clay – $25,000 – 64S/32D; Singles draw – Doubles draw	(Brazil) Carlos Kirmayr; 6–1, 7–5	(Brazil) Júlio Góes	(Finland) Leo Palin (Chile) Álvaro Fillol	(United States) Mark Turpin (Uruguay) Hugo Roverano (Brazil) Thomaz Koch (United States) Charles Owens
July 30	Salvador Challenger; Salvador, Brazil; Clay – $25,000 – 64S/32D; Singles draw – Doubles draw	(Chile) Álvaro Fillol (Netherlands) Rolf Thung; 6–7, 6–4, 7–6	(United States) Tony Graham (United States) Chris Sylvan	(Finland) Leo Palin (Chile) Álvaro Fillol	(United States) Mark Turpin (Uruguay) Hugo Roverano (Brazil) Thomaz Koch (United States) Charles Owens

=== August ===
Week of	Tournament	Champions	Runners-up	Semifinalists	Quarterfinalists
August 6	Ribeirão Preto Challenger; Ribeirão Preto, Brazil; Clay – $25,000 – 64S/32D; Singles draw – Doubles draw	(Argentina) Carlos Gattiker; 6–4, 2–6, 6–2	(Brazil) Carlos Kirmayr	(United States) Tony Graham (Argentina) Hugo Varela	(Brazil) Noel Freitas (Sweden) Jan Källqvist (Bolivia) Mario Martinez (Brazil) Thomaz Koch
August 6	Ribeirão Preto Challenger; Ribeirão Preto, Brazil; Clay – $25,000 – 64S/32D; Singles draw – Doubles draw	(Brazil) Ney Keller (Brazil) Cássio Motta; 4–6, 7–6, 7–5	(Brazil) Thomaz Koch (Chile) Belus Prajoux	(United States) Tony Graham (Argentina) Hugo Varela	(Brazil) Noel Freitas (Sweden) Jan Källqvist (Bolivia) Mario Martinez (Brazil) Thomaz Koch
August 6	Biarritz Challenger; Biarritz, France; Clay – $25,000 – 32S/16D; Singles draw – Doubles draw	(France) Éric Deblicker; 6–4, 6–4, 2–6, 2–6, 8–6	(Sweden) Kjell Johansson	(Spain) Antonio Muñoz (South Africa) Eddie Edwards	(France) Patrick Proisy (Sweden) Stefan Simonsson (Sweden) Per Hjertquist (Colombia) Jairo Velasco Sr.
August 6	Biarritz Challenger; Biarritz, France; Clay – $25,000 – 32S/16D; Singles draw – Doubles draw	(Australia) Ernie Ewert (Australia) Victor Eke; 6–1, 6–4, 6–1	(France) Hervé Gauvain (France) Jérôme Vanier	(Spain) Antonio Muñoz (South Africa) Eddie Edwards	(France) Patrick Proisy (Sweden) Stefan Simonsson (Sweden) Per Hjertquist (Colombia) Jairo Velasco Sr.
August 13	Royan Challenger; Royan, France; Clay – $25,000 – 32S/16D; Singles draw – Doubles draw	(France) Bernard Fritz; 6–4, 6–4, 7–5	(Sweden) Birger Andersson	(France) Georges Goven (Colombia) Jairo Velasco Sr.	(Spain) Javier Soler (Belgium) Thierry Stevaux (Spain) Ángel Giménez (Spain) Antonio Muñoz
August 13	Royan Challenger; Royan, France; Clay – $25,000 – 32S/16D; Singles draw – Doubles draw	(Australia) Bob Carmichael (Australia) Victor Eke; 7–5, 6–2	(Sweden) Ulf Eriksson (Sweden) Per Hjertquist	(France) Georges Goven (Colombia) Jairo Velasco Sr.	(Spain) Javier Soler (Belgium) Thierry Stevaux (Spain) Ángel Giménez (Spain) Antonio Muñoz
August 20	Le Touquet Challenger; Le Touquet, France; Clay – $25,000 – 32S/16D; Singles draw – Doubles draw	(Colombia) Jairo Velasco Sr. 4–6, 6–3, 6–3, 6–1	(Spain) Fernando Luna	(France) Hervé Gauvain (Sweden) Tenny Svensson	(South Africa) Eddie Edwards (Spain) Ángel Giménez (Spain) Roberto Vizcaíno (France) Christophe Casa
August 20	Le Touquet Challenger; Le Touquet, France; Clay – $25,000 – 32S/16D; Singles draw – Doubles draw	(Spain) Antonio Muñoz (Colombia) Jairo Velasco Sr. 6–0, 3–6, 6–3	(France) Éric Deblicker (France) Georges Goven	(France) Hervé Gauvain (Sweden) Tenny Svensson	(South Africa) Eddie Edwards (Spain) Ángel Giménez (Spain) Roberto Vizcaíno (France) Christophe Casa
August 27	No tournaments scheduled.				

=== September ===
Week of	Tournament	Champions	Runners-up	Semifinalists	Quarterfinalists
September 3	No tournaments scheduled.				
September 10	Charlotte Challenger; Charlotte, United States; Clay – $25,000 – 64S/32D; Singles draw – Doubles draw	(New Zealand) Chris Lewis; 6–2, 6–2	(Australia) David Carter	(South Africa) Deon Joubert (Australia) Paul McNamee	(United States) Michael Grant (Canada) Réjean Genois (Iran) Ali Madani (United States) Keith Richardson
September 10	Charlotte Challenger; Charlotte, United States; Clay – $25,000 – 64S/32D; Singles draw – Doubles draw	(United States) Mike Barr (United States) Jerry Karzen; 6–3, 4–6, 7–6	(United States) John Benson (United States) Tony Giammalva	(South Africa) Deon Joubert (Australia) Paul McNamee	(United States) Michael Grant (Canada) Réjean Genois (Iran) Ali Madani (United States) Keith Richardson
September 17	Lincoln Challenger; Lincoln, United States; Hard – $25,000 – 64S/32D; Singles draw – Doubles draw	(United States) Matt Mitchell; 6–4, 6–2	(United States) Peter Rennert	(United States) Jeff Robbins (India) Anand Amritraj	(South Africa) David Schneider (United States) Jai DiLouie (United States) Tony Giammalva (Australia) Steve Docherty
September 17	Lincoln Challenger; Lincoln, United States; Hard – $25,000 – 64S/32D; Singles draw – Doubles draw	(United States) Joel Bailey (United States) Bruce Kleege; 0–6, 6–4, 6–4	(United States) Steve Denton (United States) Peter Rennert	(United States) Jeff Robbins (India) Anand Amritraj	(South Africa) David Schneider (United States) Jai DiLouie (United States) Tony Giammalva (Australia) Steve Docherty
September 24	No tournaments scheduled.				

=== October ===
Week of	Tournament	Champions	Runners-up	Semifinalists	Quarterfinalists
October 1	Huntington Beach Challenger; Huntington Beach, United States; Hard – $25,000 – 64S/32D; Singles draw – Doubles draw	(United States) Glenn Petrovic; 6–4, 6–2	(United States) Marcel Freeman	(United States) Billy Martin (New Zealand) Russell Simpson	(United States) Tony Giammalva (United States) Peter Rennert (United States) John Austin (United States) Tom Leonard
October 1	Huntington Beach Challenger; Huntington Beach, United States; Hard – $25,000 – 64S/32D; Singles draw – Doubles draw	(United States) Billy Martin (United States) Bruce Nichols; 3–6, 7–6, 6–3	(United States) Peter Rennert (United States) Robert Van't Hof	(United States) Billy Martin (New Zealand) Russell Simpson	(United States) Tony Giammalva (United States) Peter Rennert (United States) John Austin (United States) Tom Leonard
October 8	No tournaments scheduled.				
October 15	No tournaments scheduled.				
October 22	Guadalajara Open; Guadalajara, Mexico; Clay – $25,000 – 32S/16D; Singles draw – Doubles draw	(Australia) Paul McNamee; 6–4, 6–4	(United States) Rick Fagel	(Australia) David Carter (United States) Tony Giammalva	(United States) Larry Davidson (United States) Fred McNair (Mexico) Alfonso González (United States) Randy Crawford
October 22	Guadalajara Open; Guadalajara, Mexico; Clay – $25,000 – 32S/16D; Singles draw – Doubles draw	(Australia) Paul McNamee (United States) Fred McNair; 6–2, 3–6, 6–3	(United States) Tony Giammalva (United States) Andy Kohlberg	(Australia) David Carter (United States) Tony Giammalva	(United States) Larry Davidson (United States) Fred McNair (Mexico) Alfonso González (United States) Randy Crawford
October 29	No tournaments scheduled.				

=== December ===
Week of	Tournament	Champions	Runners-up	Semifinalists	Quarterfinalists
December 3	Austin Challenger; Austin, United States; Hard – $25,000 – 64S/32D; Singles draw – Doubles draw	(United States) Peter Rennert; 6–3, 4–6, 7–5	(United States) Robert Van't Hof	(United States) Larry Stefanki (United States) Tony Giammalva	(United States) Vincent Van Patten (United States) Tom Cain (United States) Erick Iskersky (United States) Rick Fisher
December 3	Austin Challenger; Austin, United States; Hard – $25,000 – 64S/32D; Singles draw – Doubles draw	(India) Anand Amritraj (United States) John Austin; 6–1, 6–2	(United States) Steve Denton (United States) Mark Turpin	(United States) Larry Stefanki (United States) Tony Giammalva	(United States) Vincent Van Patten (United States) Tom Cain (United States) Erick Iskersky (United States) Rick Fisher
December 10	No tournaments scheduled.				
December 17	No tournaments scheduled.				
December 24	No tournaments scheduled.				
December 31	No tournaments scheduled.				

== Statistical information ==
These tables present the number of singles (S) and doubles (D) titles won by each player and each nation during the season, within all the tournament categories of the 1979 ATP Challenger Series. The players/nations are sorted by: (1) total number of titles (a doubles title won by two players representing the same nation counts as only one win for the nation); (2) a singles > doubles hierarchy; 3) alphabetical order (by family names for players).

=== Titles won by player ===
Total	Player	S	D
3	Billy Martin (USA)	1	2
3	Sashi Menon (IND)	0	3
3	Robert Trogolo (RSA)	0	3
2	Carlos Kirmayr (BRA)	2	0
2	Trey Waltke (USA)	2	0
2	Rod Frawley (AUS)	1	1
2	Paul McNamee (AUS)	1	1
2	Erik van Dillen (USA)	1	1
2	Jairo Velasco Sr. (COL)	1	1
2	John Austin (USA)	0	2
2	Joel Bailey (USA)	0	2
2	Victor Eke (AUS)	0	2
2	Ernie Ewert (AUS)	0	2
1	Dominique Bedel (FRA)	1	0
1	Éric Deblicker (FRA)	1	0
1	Bernard Fritz (FRA)	1	0
1	Carlos Gattiker (ARG)	1	0
1	Chris Lewis (NZL)	1	0
1	Fernando Luna (ESP)	1	0
1	Miguel Mir (ESP)	1	0
1	Matt Mitchell (USA)	1	0
1	Glenn Petrovic (USA)	1	0
1	Peter Rennert (USA)	1	0
1	John Sadri (USA)	1	0
1	Vincent Van Patten (USA)	1	0
1	Anand Amritraj (IND)	0	1
1	Mike Barr (USA)	0	1
1	Bob Carmichael (AUS)	0	1
1	Dick Crealy (AUS)	0	1
1	Kevin Curren (RSA)	0	1
1	Phil Dent (AUS)	0	1
1	Steve Denton (USA)	0	1
1	Álvaro Fillol (CHI)	0	1
1	Eric Friedler (USA)	0	1
1	Marcos Hocevar (BRA)	0	1
1	Jerry Karzen (USA)	0	1
1	Ney Keller (BRA)	0	1
1	Bruce Kleege (USA)	0	1
1	Paul Kronk (AUS)	0	1
1	Cliff Letcher (AUS)	0	1
1	Fred McNair (USA)	0	1
1	Peter McNamara (AUS)	0	1
1	Cássio Motta (BRA)	0	1
1	Antonio Muñoz (ESP)	0	1
1	Bruce Nichols (USA)	0	1
1	Alejandro Pierola (CHI)	0	1
1	João Soares (BRA)	0	1
1	Rolf Thung (NED)	0	1

=== Titles won by nation ===
Total	Nation	S	D
18	United States (USA)	9	9
9	Australia (AUS)	2	7
4	Brazil (BRA)	2	2
4	India (IND)	0	4
4	South Africa (RSA)	0	4
3	France (FRA)	3	0
3	Spain (ESP)	2	1
3	Chile (CHI)	1	2
2	Colombia (COL)	1	1
1	Argentina (ARG)	1	0
1	New Zealand (NZL)	1	0
1	Netherlands (NED)	0	1

== See also ==
- 1979 Grand Prix
- Association of Tennis Professionals
- International Tennis Federation
