= 1978 ATP Challenger Series =

Details
- Duration: 9 January 1978 – 26 November 1978
- Edition: 1st
- Tournaments: 18

Achievements (singles)

The ATP Challenger Series is the second-tier tour for professional tennis organised by the Association of Tennis Professionals (ATP). The 1978 ATP Challenger Series calendar comprises 18 tournaments with prize money of $25,000. The American leg of the tour was known as the AMEX Challenger Circuit.

== Schedule ==
=== January ===
Week of	Tournament	Champions	Runners-up	Semifinalists	Quarterfinalists
January 2	No tournaments scheduled.				
January 9	Benson and Hedges Open; Auckland, New Zealand; Hard – $25,000 – 32S/16D; Singles draw – Doubles draw	(United States) Eliot Teltscher; 6–3, 7–5, 6–1	(New Zealand) Onny Parun	(Australia) Rod Frawley (United Kingdom) Robin Drysdale	(West Germany) Karl Meiler (New Zealand) Russell Simpson (United States) Eric Fromm (New Zealand) Chris Lewis
January 9	Benson and Hedges Open; Auckland, New Zealand; Hard – $25,000 – 32S/16D; Singles draw – Doubles draw	(New Zealand) Chris Lewis (New Zealand) Russell Simpson; 6–1, 7–6	(Australia) Rod Frawley (West Germany) Karl Meiler	(Australia) Rod Frawley (United Kingdom) Robin Drysdale	(West Germany) Karl Meiler (New Zealand) Russell Simpson (United States) Eric Fromm (New Zealand) Chris Lewis
January 9	Tasmanian Championshipsr; Hobart, Australia; Hard – $25,000 – 32S/16D; Singles draw – Doubles draw	(Australia) Bob Carmichael; 4–6, 6–3, 6–4	(Australia) John Marks	(Australia) Peter McNamara (Australia) Allan Stone	(Australia) David Carter (Australia) Chris Kachel (Australia) Lawrence Hall (Australia) Terry Rocavert
January 9	Tasmanian Championshipsr; Hobart, Australia; Hard – $25,000 – 32S/16D; Singles draw – Doubles draw	(Australia) Chris Kachel (Australia) John Marks; 6–1, 6–4	(Australia) Greg Braun (Australia) Peter Campbell	(Australia) Peter McNamara (Australia) Allan Stone	(Australia) David Carter (Australia) Chris Kachel (Australia) Lawrence Hall (Australia) Terry Rocavert
January 16	No tournaments scheduled.				
January 23	No tournaments scheduled.				
January 30	No tournaments scheduled.				

=== June ===
Week of	Tournament	Champions	Runners-up	Semifinalists	Quarterfinalists
June 5	No tournaments scheduled.				
June 12	No tournaments scheduled.				
June 19	Shreveport International; Shreveport, United States; Hard – $25,000 – 64S/32D; Singles draw – Doubles draw	(Paraguay) Francisco González; 7–6, 6–2	(Mexico) Marcello Lara	(Canada) Réjean Genois (United States) Eliot Teltscher	(Australia) Warren Maher (United States) John Sadri (United States) Keith Richardson (United States) Ferdi Taygan
June 19	Shreveport International; Shreveport, United States; Hard – $25,000 – 64S/32D; Singles draw – Doubles draw	(Bolivia) Ramiro Benavides (Canada) Réjean Genois; 7–6, 4–6, 6–2	(United States) Woody Blocher (United States) Dick R. Bohrnstedt	(Canada) Réjean Genois (United States) Eliot Teltscher	(Australia) Warren Maher (United States) John Sadri (United States) Keith Richardson (United States) Ferdi Taygan
June 25	Birmingham Classic; Birmingham, United States; Grass – $25,000 – 64S/32D; Singles draw – Doubles draw	(South Africa) Deon Joubert; 6–4, 6–2	(Mexico) Marcello Lara	(United States) Robert Van't Hof (Paraguay) Francisco González	(United States) Mike Cahill (United States) Keith Richardson (Australia) Alvin Gardiner (France) Christophe Freyss
June 25	Birmingham Classic; Birmingham, United States; Grass – $25,000 – 64S/32D; Singles draw – Doubles draw	(United States) Mike Cahill (Mexico) Marcello Lara; 6–7, 6–4, 6–4	(United States) Woody Blocher (United States) Dick R. Bohrnstedt	(United States) Robert Van't Hof (Paraguay) Francisco González	(United States) Mike Cahill (United States) Keith Richardson (Australia) Alvin Gardiner (France) Christophe Freyss

=== July ===
Week of	Tournament	Champions	Runners-up	Semifinalists	Quarterfinalists
July 3	Asheville Open; Asheville, United States; Clay – $25,000 – 64S/32D; Singles draw – Doubles draw	(United States) Eliot Teltscher; 6–1, 7–5	(South Africa) Deon Joubert	(United States) Mike Cahill (United States) Erick Iskersky	(Paraguay) Francisco González (France) Gilles Moretton (United States) Joe Meyers (France) Pascal Portes
July 3	Asheville Open; Asheville, United States; Clay – $25,000 – 64S/32D; Singles draw – Doubles draw	(Bolivia) Ramiro Benavides (Canada) Réjean Genois; 7–5, 4–6, 7–6	(United States) Jai DiLouie (United States) Ferdi Taygan	(United States) Mike Cahill (United States) Erick Iskersky	(Paraguay) Francisco González (France) Gilles Moretton (United States) Joe Meyers (France) Pascal Portes
July 10	Raleigh International; Raleigh, United States; Clay – $25,000 – 64S/32D; Singles draw – Doubles draw	(United States) Mike Cahill; 6–3, 3–6, 7–6	(South Africa) Willem Prinsloo	(United States) Dick R. Bohrnstedt (Colombia) Álvaro Betancur	(United States) Pat DuPré (United States) Eliot Teltscher (United States) Erick Iskersky (Paraguay) Francisco González
July 10	Raleigh International; Raleigh, United States; Clay – $25,000 – 64S/32D; Singles draw – Doubles draw	(Paraguay) Francisco González (United States) Chris Sylvan; 6–2, 3–6, 6–3	(United States) Bill Csipkay (United States) John Sadri	(United States) Dick R. Bohrnstedt (Colombia) Álvaro Betancur	(United States) Pat DuPré (United States) Eliot Teltscher (United States) Erick Iskersky (Paraguay) Francisco González
July 17	Hilton Head Open; Hilton Head, United States; Clay – $25,000 – 64S/32D; Singles draw – Doubles draw	(Chile) Ricardo Acuña; 1–6, 6–3, 7–6	(United States) Tim Garcia	(Rhodesia) Haroon Ismail (South Africa) Willem Prinsloo	(Colombia) Carlos Gómez (United States) John Holladay (Australia) Paul Kronk (United States) Howard Schoenfield
July 17	Hilton Head Open; Hilton Head, United States; Clay – $25,000 – 64S/32D; Singles draw – Doubles draw	(South Africa) Kevin Curren (United States) Peter Rennert; 6–3, 4–6, 6–2	(Australia) Greg Braun (Australia) Paul Kronk	(Rhodesia) Haroon Ismail (South Africa) Willem Prinsloo	(Colombia) Carlos Gómez (United States) John Holladay (Australia) Paul Kronk (United States) Howard Schoenfield
July 24	Virginia Beach International; Virginia Beach, United States; Hard – $25,000 – 64S/32D; Singles draw – Doubles draw	(South Africa) Deon Joubert; 7–5, 6–1	(United States) Mike Cahill	(United States) Trey Waltke (New Zealand) Russell Simpson	(United States) Howard Schoenfield (United States) Butch Seewagen (Canada) Réjean Genois (South Africa) Johan Kriek
July 24	Virginia Beach International; Virginia Beach, United States; Hard – $25,000 – 64S/32D; Singles draw – Doubles draw	(South Africa) Kevin Curren (United States) Peter Rennert; 6–3, 6–2	(United States) Joe Meyers (United States) Trey Waltke	(United States) Trey Waltke (New Zealand) Russell Simpson	(United States) Howard Schoenfield (United States) Butch Seewagen (Canada) Réjean Genois (South Africa) Johan Kriek
July 31	AMEX Wall; Wall, United States; Hard – $25,000 – 64S/32D; Singles draw – Doubles draw	(South Africa) Johan Kriek; 6–1, 7–6	(United States) Matt Mitchell	(United States) Jay Lapidus (Australia) Dale Collings	(United States) Christopher Lewis (United States) Erick Iskersky (United States) Joel Bailey (Rhodesia) Haroon Ismail
July 31	AMEX Wall; Wall, United States; Hard – $25,000 – 64S/32D; Singles draw – Doubles draw	(South Africa) Kevin Curren (United States) Peter Rennert; 6–1, 6–3	(United States) Jai DiLouie (Rhodesia) Haroon Ismail	(United States) Jay Lapidus (Australia) Dale Collings	(United States) Christopher Lewis (United States) Erick Iskersky (United States) Joel Bailey (Rhodesia) Haroon Ismail

=== August ===
Week of	Tournament	Champions	Runners-up	Semifinalists	Quarterfinalists
August 7	AMEX Cape Cod Open; Cape Cod, United States; Hard – $25,000 – 64S/32D; Singles draw – Doubles draw	(New Zealand) Russell Simpson; 6–4, 7–5	(South Africa) David Schneider	(United States) John Holladay (Australia) Peter Campbell	(Australia) Noel Phillips (United States) Hubertus Hoyt (United States) Bill Maze (United States) Charles Strode
August 7	AMEX Cape Cod Open; Cape Cod, United States; Hard – $25,000 – 64S/32D; Singles draw – Doubles draw	(United States) Matt Mitchell (United States) Bill Maze; 6–4, 6–4	(South Africa) Kevin Curren (United States) Peter Rennert	(United States) John Holladay (Australia) Peter Campbell	(Australia) Noel Phillips (United States) Hubertus Hoyt (United States) Bill Maze (United States) Charles Strode
August 14	AMEX Lancaster Open; Lancaster, United States; Hard – $25,000 – 64S/32D; Singles draw – Doubles draw	(United States) Erik van Dillen; 6–4, 6–7, 7–6	(South Africa) Kevin Curren	(Australia) Peter Campbell (United States) John Austin	(United States) Michael Greenberg (South Africa) David Schneider (New Zealand) Russell Simpson (United States) Ferdi Taygan
August 14	AMEX Lancaster Open; Lancaster, United States; Hard – $25,000 – 64S/32D; Singles draw – Doubles draw	(United States) Matt Mitchell (United States) Bill Maze; 7–5, 6–3	(South Africa) Kevin Curren (United States) Peter Rennert	(Australia) Peter Campbell (United States) John Austin	(United States) Michael Greenberg (South Africa) David Schneider (New Zealand) Russell Simpson (United States) Ferdi Taygan
August 21	No tournaments scheduled.				
August 28	No tournaments scheduled.				

=== September ===
Week of	Tournament	Champions	Runners-up	Semifinalists	Quarterfinalists
September 4	No tournaments scheduled.				
September 11	No tournaments scheduled.				
September 18	No tournaments scheduled.				
September 25	AMEX Tinton Falls Open; Tinton Falls, United States; Hard – $25,000 – 64S/32D; Singles draw – Doubles draw	(India) Sashi Menon; 3–6, 7–5, 6–3	(United States) John Sadri	(United States) Richard Meyer (United States) Bruce Kleege	(South Africa) David Schneider (United States) Rocky Maguire (Rhodesia) Haroon Ismail (United States) Michael Greenberg
September 25	AMEX Tinton Falls Open; Tinton Falls, United States; Hard – $25,000 – 64S/32D; Singles draw – Doubles draw	(United States) Keith Richardson (United States) John Sadri; 6–7, 6–3, 6–4	(United States) Scott Carnahan (United States) Charles Strode	(United States) Richard Meyer (United States) Bruce Kleege	(South Africa) David Schneider (United States) Rocky Maguire (Rhodesia) Haroon Ismail (United States) Michael Greenberg
September 25	AMEX Lincoln Open; Lincoln, United States; Hard – $25,000 – 64S/32D; Singles draw – Doubles draw	(United States) John Sadri; 6–3, 6–2	(South Africa) Kevin Curren	(United States) Eric Fromm (United States) John Hayes	(Australia) Brad Drewett (Australia) John Trickey (United States) Richard Meyer (United States) Bruce Kleege
September 25	AMEX Lincoln Open; Lincoln, United States; Hard – $25,000 – 64S/32D; Singles draw – Doubles draw	(United States) Keith Richardson (United States) John Sadri; 4–6, 6–3, 7–5	(United States) Richard Meyer (United States) Horace Reid	(United States) Eric Fromm (United States) John Hayes	(Australia) Brad Drewett (Australia) John Trickey (United States) Richard Meyer (United States) Bruce Kleege

=== October ===
Week of	Tournament	Champions	Runners-up	Semifinalists	Quarterfinalists
October 2	Salt Lake City International; Salt Lake City, United States; Hard – $25,000 – 64S/32D; Singles draw – Doubles draw	(South Africa) Kevin Curren; 6–4, 6–0	(Australia) Steve Docherty	(United States) Warren Eber (United States) Randy Crawford	(United States) Gene Malin (United States) Mike Machette (United States) Jon Molin (Canada) Richard Legendre
October 2	Salt Lake City International; Salt Lake City, United States; Hard – $25,000 – 64S/32D; Singles draw – Doubles draw	(Mexico) Marcello Lara (United States) John Whitlinger; 6–4, 6–2	(Rhodesia) Haroon Ismail (Australia) Warren Maher	(United States) Warren Eber (United States) Randy Crawford	(United States) Gene Malin (United States) Mike Machette (United States) Jon Molin (Canada) Richard Legendre
October 9	No tournaments scheduled.				
October 16	Crow Canyon Classic; San Ramon, United States; Hard – $25,000 – 64S/32D; Singles draw – Doubles draw	(United States) Tim Wilkison; 7–6, 6–1	(United States) Bruce Manson	(Australia) Bill Lloyd (United Kingdom) Michael Wayman	(United States) Mike Shore (United States) Bill Maze (New Zealand) Russell Simpson (United States) Marty Riessen
October 16	Crow Canyon Classic; San Ramon, United States; Hard – $25,000 – 64S/32D; Singles draw – Doubles draw	(Mexico) Marcello Lara (United States) John Whitlinger; 6–3, 3–6, 7–6	(United States) Rick Fisher (United States) Erik van Dillen	(Australia) Bill Lloyd (United Kingdom) Michael Wayman	(United States) Mike Shore (United States) Bill Maze (New Zealand) Russell Simpson (United States) Marty Riessen
October 16	Tel Aviv Open; Tel Aviv, Israel; Hard – $25,000 – 32S/16D; Singles draw – Doubles draw	(Netherlands) Tom Okker; 6–7, 6–4, 6–2	(Austria) Peter Feigl	(Israel) Shlomo Glickstein (South Africa) David Schneider	(Canada) Réjean Genois (United Kingdom) Richard Lewis (United States) Eric Friedler (Israel) Steve Krulevitz
October 16	Tel Aviv Open; Tel Aviv, Israel; Hard – $25,000 – 32S/16D; Singles draw – Doubles draw	(Austria) Peter Feigl (United States) Eric Friedler; 6–3, 6–7, 6–3	(United States) Mike Fishbach (Netherlands) Tom Okker	(Israel) Shlomo Glickstein (South Africa) David Schneider	(Canada) Réjean Genois (United Kingdom) Richard Lewis (United States) Eric Friedler (Israel) Steve Krulevitz
October 23	Pasadena Open; Pasadena, United States; Hard – $25,000 – 64S/32D; Singles draw – Doubles draw	(Venezuela) Jorge Andrew; 5–7, 6–3, 6–3	(United States) Christopher Lewis	(United States) Tim Wilkison (United States) Howard Schoenfield	(United States) Billy Martin (United States) Erik van Dillen (United States) Peter Pearson (Finland) Leo Palin
October 23	Pasadena Open; Pasadena, United States; Hard – $25,000 – 64S/32D; Singles draw – Doubles draw	(United States) Tom Leonard (United States) Jerry Van Linge; 6–3, 7–6	(United States) Warren Eber (United States) Glen Holroyd	(United States) Tim Wilkison (United States) Howard Schoenfield	(United States) Billy Martin (United States) Erik van Dillen (United States) Peter Pearson (Finland) Leo Palin
October 30	No tournaments scheduled.				

=== November ===
Week of	Tournament	Champions	Runners-up	Semifinalists	Quarterfinalists
November 6	No tournaments scheduled.				
November 13	No tournaments scheduled.				
November 20	Kyoto Classic; Kyoto, Japan; Clay – $25,000 – 32S/16D; Singles draw – Doubles draw	(Australia) Ross Case; 6–1, 6–7, 6–1	(Japan) Jun Kuki	(United States) Joel Bailey (Japan) Sachio Kato	(United States) Tony Graham (Japan) Jun Kamiwazumi (Japan) Shigeyuki Nishio (Japan) Tsuyoshi Fukui
November 20	Kyoto Classic; Kyoto, Japan; Clay – $25,000 – 32S/16D; Singles draw – Doubles draw	(Australia) Ross Case (United States) Tony Graham; 6–3, 6–4	(United States) Joel Bailey (United States) Scott Carnahan	(United States) Joel Bailey (Japan) Sachio Kato	(United States) Tony Graham (Japan) Jun Kamiwazumi (Japan) Shigeyuki Nishio (Japan) Tsuyoshi Fukui
November 27	No tournaments scheduled.				

== Statistical information ==
These tables present the number of singles (S) and doubles (D) titles won by each player and each nation during the season, within all the tournament categories of the 1978 ATP Challenger Series. The players/nations are sorted by: 1) total number of titles (a doubles title won by two players representing the same nation counts as only one win for the nation); 2) a singles > doubles hierarchy; 3) alphabetical order (by family names for players).

=== Titles won by player ===
Total	Player	S	D
4	Kevin Curren (RSA)	1	3
3	John Sadri (USA)	1	2
3	Marcello Lara (MEX)	0	3
3	Peter Rennert (USA)	0	3
2	Deon Joubert (RSA)	2	0
2	Eliot Teltscher (USA)	2	0
2	Mike Cahill (USA)	1	1
2	Ross Case (AUS)	1	1
2	Francisco González (PAR)	1	1
2	Russell Simpson (NZL)	1	1
2	Ramiro Benavides (BOL)	0	2
2	Réjean Génois (CAN)	0	2
2	Bill Maze (USA)	0	2
2	Matt Mitchell (USA)	0	2
2	Keith Richardson (USA)	0	2
2	John Whitlinger (USA)	0	2
1	Ricardo Acuña (CHI)	1	0
1	Jorge Andrew (VEN)	1	0
1	Bob Carmichael (AUS)	1	0
1	Johan Kriek (RSA)	1	0
1	Sashi Menon (IND)	1	0
1	Tom Okker (NED)	1	0
1	Erik van Dillen (USA)	1	0
1	Tim Wilkison (USA)	1	0
1	Peter Feigl (AUT)	0	1
1	Eric Friedler (USA)	0	1
1	Tony Graham (USA)	0	1
1	Chris Kachel (AUS)	0	1
1	Tom Leonard (USA)	0	1
1	Chris Lewis (NZL)	0	1
1	John Marks (AUS)	0	1
1	Chris Sylvan (USA)	0	1
1	Jerry Van Linge (USA)	0	1

=== Titles won by nation ===
Total	Nation	S	D
20	United States (USA)	6	14
7	South Africa (RSA)	4	3
4	Australia (AUS)	2	2
3	Mexico (MEX)	0	3
2	New Zealand (NZL)	1	1
2	Paraguay (PAR)	1	1
2	Bolivia (BOL)	0	2
2	Canada (CAN)	0	2
1	Chile (CHI)	1	0
1	India (IND)	1	0
1	Netherlands (NED)	1	0
1	Venezuela (VEN)	1	0
1	Austria (AUT)	0	1

== See also ==
- 1978 Grand Prix
- Association of Tennis Professionals
- International Tennis Federation
