= 1979 US Open – Men's doubles =

Men's doubles
- 1979 US Open

Final
- Champion: (United States) John McEnroe (United States) Peter Fleming
- Runner-up: (United States) Bob Lutz (United States) Stan Smith
- Score: 6–2, 6–4

Details
- Draw: 64
- Seeds: 16

Events
Singles	men	women		boys	girls
Doubles	men	women	mixed	boys	girls
WC Singles	men	women	quad
WC Doubles	men	women	quad
Legends	men	women	mixed
← 1978 ·	US Open	· 1980 →

The men's doubles tournament at the 1979 US Open was held from August 28 to September 9, 1979 on the outdoor hard courts at the USTA National Tennis Center in New York City, United States. John McEnroe and Peter Fleming won the title, defeating Bob Lutz and Stan Smith in the final.

== Seeds ==
1. (United States) Peter Fleming / (United States) John McEnroe (champion)
2. (Poland) Wojciech Fibak / (Netherlands) Tom Okker (second round)
3. (United States) Marty Riessen / (United States) Sherwood Stewart (semifinal)
4. (United States) Bob Lutz / (United States) Stan Smith (final)
5. (United States) Brian Gottfried / (Mexico) Raúl Ramírez (second round)
6. (South Africa) Bob Hewitt / (South Africa) Frew McMillan (quarterfinal)
7. (Romania) Ilie Năstase / (Romania) Ion Țiriac (first round)
8. (Czechoslovakia) Jan Kodeš / (Czechoslovakia) Tomáš Šmíd (second round)
9. (Australia) Bob Carmichael / (Australia) Phil Dent (second round)
10. (India) Vijay Amritraj / (United States) Gene Mayer (first round)
11. (Australia) Mark Edmondson / (Australia) John Marks (second round)
12. (India) Anand Amritraj / (Australia) Ross Case (first round)
13. (United States) Tim Gullikson / (United States) Tom Gullikson (third round)
14. (United States) Bruce Manson / (Zimbabwe) Andrew Pattison (quarter final)
15. (United States) Pat DuPré / (United States) Dick Stockton (first round)
16. (United Kingdom) Colin Dowdeswell / (Switzerland) Heinz Günthardt (third round)

== Draw ==
=== Key ===
- Q = Qualifier
- WC = Wild card
- LL = Lucky loser
- Alt = Alternate
- ITF = ITF entry
- PR = Protected ranking
- SR = Special ranking
- SE = Special exempt
- JE = Junior exempt
- JR = Junior Accelerator Programme entrant
- CO = College Accelerator Programme entrant
- NG = Next Gen Accelerator Program entrant
- w/o = Walkover
- r = Retired
- d = Defaulted

=== Finals ===
Quarterfinals
1	(United States) Peter Fleming (United States) John McEnroe	4	7	6
14	(United States) Bruce Manson (Zimbabwe Rhodesia) Andrew Pattison	6	5	3
3	(United States) Marty Riessen (United States) Sherwood Stewart	7	6	6
(Paraguay) Francisco González (United States) Eliot Teltscher	6	7	2
6	(South Africa) Bob Hewitt (South Africa) Frew McMillan	3	5
4	(United States) Bob Lutz (United States) Stan Smith	6	7
(United States) John Sadri (United States) Tim Wilkison	3	5
(Australia) Roy Emerson (Australia) Fred Stolle	6	7

Semifinals
1	(United States) Peter Fleming (United States) John McEnroe	6	6
3	(United States) Marty Riessen (United States) Sherwood Stewart	4	4
4	(United States) Bob Lutz (United States) Stan Smith	7	3	7
(Australia) Roy Emerson (Australia) Fred Stolle	5	6	5

Final
1	(United States) Peter Fleming (United States) John McEnroe	6	6
4	(United States) Bob Lutz (United States) Stan Smith	2	4

=== Top half ===
==== Section 1 ====
First round
1	(United States) P Fleming (United States) J McEnroe	6	7
(United States) S Denton (United States) R Van't Hof	3	5
(United Kingdom) J Lloyd (United States) F McNair	6	6
(Australia) P Davies (United States) J Hayes	3	1
(Australia) J Newcombe (United States) J Turpin	7	6
(United States) W Blocher (Canada) H Fritz	5	3
16	(United Kingdom) C Dowdeswell (Switzerland) H Günthardt	W-O
(Australia) P Campbell (United States) C Strode
14	(United States) B Manson (Zimbabwe Rhodesia) A Pattison	6	6
(United States) T Leonard (United States) J Van Linge	4	4
(Argentina) L Álvarez (Australia) P McNamee	6	6	6
(United States) J Bailey (Netherlands) R Thung	7	3	4
(United States) R Meyer (United States) H Reid	6	6	6
(United States) C Owens (United States) S Vuille	4	7	4
(United States) F Buehning (United States) P Rennert	7	5	6
7	(Romania) I Năstase (Romania) Ion Țiriac	6	7	2

Second round
1	(United States) P Fleming (United States) J McEnroe	6	6
(United Kingdom) J Lloyd (United States) F McNair	2	2
(Australia) J Newcombe (United States) J Turpin	3	4
16	(United Kingdom) C Dowdeswell (Switzerland) H Günthardt	6	6
14	(United States) B Manson (Zimbabwe Rhodesia) A Pattison	6	6
(Argentina) L Álvarez (Australia) P McNamee	4	3
(United States) R Meyer (United States) H Reid	6	6
(United States) F Buehning (United States) P Rennert	7	7

Third round
1	(United States) P Fleming (United States) J McEnroe	6	6
16	(United Kingdom) C Dowdeswell (Switzerland) H Günthardt	3	2
14	(United States) B Manson (Zimbabwe Rhodesia) A Pattison	6	6
(United States) F Buehning (United States) P Rennert	3	2

Quarterfinals
1	(United States) P Fleming (United States) J McEnroe	4	7	6
14	(United States) B Manson (Zimbabwe Rhodesia) A Pattison	6	5	3

==== Section 2 ====
First round
3	(United States) M Riessen (United States) S Stewart	6	7
(United States) J Eagleton (South Africa) R Trogolo	1	5
(United States) E Fromm (United States) J Molin	6	5	6
(Bolivia) R Benavides (Zimbabwe Rhodesia) H Ismail	3	7	4
(South Africa) B Mitton (South Africa) R Moore	6	2	6
(Sweden) O Bengtson (United States) B Martin	4	6	3
9	(Australia) B Carmichael (Australia) P Dent	6	6
(United States) T Garcia (United States) M Grant	3	2
(Australia) C Dibley (Chile) J Fillol	7	2	6
12	(India) A Amritraj (Australia) R Case	6	6	2
(United States) V Amaya (United States) H Pfister	6	6
(United States) J Kriek (United States) N Saviano	3	2
(Paraguay) F González (United States) E Teltscher	6	7
(United Kingdom) R Beven (United Kingdom) J Paish	1	6
5	(United States) B Gottfried (Mexico) R Ramírez	6	7
(United States) R Crawford (United States) T Delatte	3	5

Second round
3	(United States) M Riessen (United States) S Stewart	6	6
(United States) E Fromm (United States) J Molin	3	4
(South Africa) B Mitton (South Africa) R Moore	1	6	6
9	(Australia) B Carmichael (Australia) P Dent	6	2	1
(Australia) C Dibley (Chile) J Fillol	4	7	6
(United States) V Amaya (United States) H Pfister	6	6	7
(Paraguay) F González (United States) E Teltscher	6	7
5	(United States) B Gottfried (Mexico) R Ramírez	2	5

Third round
3	(United States) M Riessen (United States) S Stewart	6	7
(South Africa) B Mitton (South Africa) R Moore	3	6
(United States) V Amaya (United States) H Pfister	7	3	2
(Paraguay) F González (United States) E Teltscher	5	6	6

Quarterfinals
3	(United States) M Riessen (United States) S Stewart	7	6	6
(Paraguay) F González (United States) E Teltscher	6	7	2

=== Bottom half ===
==== Section 3 ====
First round
6	(South Africa) B Hewitt (South Africa) F McMillan	6	6
(United States) M De Palmer (United States) R Harmon	2	4
(United States) J Austin (United States) V Winitsky	7	6
(United States) Kh Richardson (South Africa) J Yuill	6	1
(Ecuador) A Gómez (Ecuador) R Ycaza	6	3	6
(Australia) S Ball (Australia) K Warwick	3	6	3
13	(United States) Tim Gullikson (United States) Tom Gullikson	6	6
(Australia) A Gardiner (Australia) T Rocavert	4	4
(Australia) C Fancutt (United States) A Kohlberg	2	7	6
15	(United States) P DuPré (United States) D Stockton	6	6	2
(Australia) S Docherty (Australia) J James	6	6
(Iran) A Madani (South Africa) M Myburg	4	1
(United States) B Maze (United States) B Walts	6	6	6
(India) A Amritraj (South Africa) W Prinsloo	7	4	4
4	(United States) B Lutz (United States) S Smith	6	6
(Uruguay) J-L Damiani (Argentina) A Gattiker	3	4

Second round
6	(South Africa) B Hewitt (South Africa) F McMillan	6	6
(United States) J Austin (United States) V Winitsky	4	2
(Ecuador) A Gómez (Ecuador) R Ycaza	4	4
13	(United States) T Gullikson (United States) T Gullikson	6	6
(Australia) C Fancutt (United States) A Kohlberg	6	2	4
(Australia) S Docherty (Australia) J James	3	6	6
(United States) B Maze (United States) B Walts	5	4
4	(United States) B Lutz (United States) S Smith	7	6

Third round
6	(South Africa) B Hewitt (South Africa) F McMillan	6	7
13	(United States) T Gullikson (United States) T Gullikson	2	5
(Australia) S Docherty (Australia) J James	6	4
4	(United States) B Lutz (United States) S Smith	7	6

Quarterfinals
6	(South Africa) B Hewitt (South Africa) F McMillan	3	5
4	(United States) B Lutz (United States) S Smith	6	7

==== Section 4 ====
First round
8	(Czechoslovakia) J Kodeš (Czechoslovakia) T Šmíd	6	6	6
(United States) M Purcell (United States) B Testerman	7	2	2
(United States) C Pasarell (South Africa) D Schneider	6	7
(United States) G Amaya (United States) G Oropez	2	6
(United States) J Sadri (United States) T Wilkison	6	2	7
(United States) G Malin (United States) V Van Patten	3	6	5
11	(Australia) M Edmondson (Australia) J Marks	6	6
(Sweden) J Norbäck (New Zealand) R Simpson	1	2
(Spain) J Garcia-Requena (United States) B Kleege	6	6	6
10	(India) V Amritraj (United States) G Mayer	7	4	4
(United States) S Davis (United States) D Ralston	6	6	6
(Australia) W Girle (Australia) T Williams	7	3	4
(Australia) R Emerson (Australia) F Stolle	6	3	6
(United States) K Curren (United States) M Shore	3	6	4
2	(Poland) W Fibak (Netherlands) T Okker	7	6
(New Zealand) C Lewis (United States) B Nichols	6	3

Second round
8	(Czechoslovakia) J Kodeš (Czechoslovakia) T Šmíd	6	3
(United States) C Pasarell (South Africa) D Schneider	7	6
(United States) J Sadri (United States) T Wilkison	6	6
11	(Australia) M Edmondson (Australia) J Marks	4	4
(Spain) J Garcia-Requena (United States) B Kleege	3	5
(United States) S Davis (United States) D Ralston	6	7
(Australia) R Emerson (Australia) F Stolle	6	6	6
2	(Poland) W Fibak (Netherlands) T Okker	7	4	1

Third round
(United States) C Pasarell (South Africa) D Schneider	3	3
(United States) J Sadri (United States) T Wilkison	6	6
(United States) S Davis (United States) D Ralston	6	3	3
(Australia) R Emerson (Australia) F Stolle	1	6	6

Quarterfinals
(United States) J Sadri (United States) T Wilkison	3	5
(Australia) R Emerson (Australia) F Stolle	6	7
