= 1979 US Open – Mixed doubles =

Mixed doubles
- 1979 US Open

Final
- Champions: (South Africa) Greer Stevens (South Africa) Bob Hewitt
- Runners-up: (Netherlands) Betty Stöve (South Africa) Frew McMillan
- Score: 6–3, 7–5

Details
- Draw: 32
- Seeds: 6

Events
Singles	men	women		boys	girls
Doubles	men	women	mixed	boys	girls
WC Singles	men	women	quad
WC Doubles	men	women	quad
Legends	men	women	mixed
← 1978 ·	US Open	· 1980 →

Betty Stöve and Frew McMillan were the defending champions, but lost in the final against Greer Stevens and Bob Hewitt. The score was 6–3, 7–5.

== Seeds ==
1. (South Africa) Greer Stevens / (South Africa) Bob Hewitt (champions)
2. (Netherlands) Betty Stöve / (South Africa) Frew McMillan (final)
3. (United States) Betsy Nagelsen / (Australia) Kim Warwick (first round)
4. (United States) Renée Richards / (Romania) Ilie Năstase (semifinals)
5. (United States) Martina Navratilova / (United States) Bill Scanlon (semifinals)
6. (United States) Billie Jean King / (United States) Ben Testerman (second round, withdrew)

== Draw ==
=== Key ===
- Q = Qualifier
- WC = Wild card
- LL = Lucky loser
- Alt = Alternate
- SE = Special exempt
- PR = Protected ranking
- ITF = ITF entry
- JE = Junior exempt
- w/o = Walkover
- r = Retired
- d = Defaulted
- SR = Special ranking

=== Finals ===
Semifinals
1	(South Africa) Bob Hewitt (South Africa) Greer Stevens	6	6
4	(Romania) Ilie Năstase (United States) Renée Richards	0	4
5	(United States) Bill Scanlon (United States) Martina Navratilova	6	3
2	(South Africa) Frew McMillan (Netherlands) Betty Stöve	7	6

Final
1	(South Africa) Bob Hewitt (South Africa) Greer Stevens	6	7
2	(South Africa) Frew McMillan (Netherlands) Betty Stöve	3	5

=== Top half ===
First round
1	(South Africa) B Hewitt (South Africa) G Stevens	6	6
(United States) J Molin (United States) L Allen	1	4
(United States) P Rennert (United States) K Jordan	5	6	6
(Switzerland) C Dowdeswell (United States) J Russell	7	3	4
(United States) R Tyler (Australia) C O'Neil
(South Africa) K Curren (United States) A Smith	w/o
(United States) D Siegler (United States) D Gilbert	3	2
(India) V Amritraj (United States) P Shriver	6	6
4	(Romania) I Năstase (United States) R Richards	6	6
(United States) C Strode (United States) L Antonoplis	1	2
(United States) R Harmon (United States) A Whitmore	3	4
(United States) E Teltscher (United States) M Carillo	6	6
(United States) B Walts (United States) K Shaw-Ziska	7	5	7
(United States) F Buehning (United States) J Anthony	5	7	6
(Australia) F Stolle (United States) B Potter	2	4
6	(United States) B Testerman (United States) B Jean King	6	6

Second round
1	(South Africa) B Hewitt (South Africa) G Stevens	3	6	6
(United States) P Rennert (United States) K Jordan	6	3	4
(South Africa) K Curren (United States) A Smith	6	6
(India) V Amritraj (United States) P Shriver	2	3
4	(Romania) I Năstase (United States) R Richards	6	6
(United States) E Teltscher (United States) M Carillo	0	3
(United States) B Walts (United States) K Shaw-Ziska	w/o
6	(United States) B Testerman (United States) B Jean King

Quarterfinals
1	(South Africa) B Hewitt (South Africa) G Stevens	7	6
(South Africa) K Curren (United States) A Smith	5	4
4	(Romania) I Năstase (United States) R Richards	6	6
(United States) B Walts (United States) K Shaw-Ziska	2	4

Semifinals
1	(South Africa) B Hewitt (South Africa) G Stevens	6	6
4	(Romania) I Năstase (United States) R Richards	0	4

=== Bottom half ===
First round
5	(United States) Bill Scanlon (United States) Martina Navratilova	6	6
(United States) David Sherbeck (United States) Jane Stratton	2	1
(United States) Mel Purcell (United States) Mary-Lou Piatek	3	7	4
(United States) Van Winitsky (United States) Rayni Fox	6	5	6
(Australia) John Marks (South Africa) Ilana Kloss	6	1	4
(Mexico) Raúl Ramírez (West Germany) Bettina Bunge	4	6	6
(United States) Tom Leonard (United States) Barbara Hallquist	6	6
3	(Australia) Kim Warwick (United States) Betsy Nagelsen	4	1
(United States) Jerry Van Linge (United States) Betty-Ann Stuart	4	2
(Australia) Mark Edmondson (South Africa) Marise Kruger	6	6
(India) Anand Amritraj (France) Françoise Dürr	4	6	7
(United States) Andy Kohlberg (United States) Trey Lewis	6	1	5
(United States) Gene Malin (United States) Penny Johnson	7	5	6
(United States) Scott Davis (United States) Anna-Maria Fernandez	6	7	7
(United States) Mike Margolin (United States) Stacy Margolin	2	4
2	(South Africa) Frew McMillan (Netherlands) Betty Stöve	6	6

Second round
5	(United States) Bill Scanlon (United States) Martina Navratilova	6	6	7
(United States) Van Winitsky (United States) Rayni Fox	4	7	6
(Mexico) Raúl Ramírez (West Germany) Bettina Bunge	6	5	6
(United States) Tom Leonard (United States) Barbara Hallquist	3	7	4
(Australia) Mark Edmondson (South Africa) Marise Kruger	4	2
(India) Anand Amritraj (France) Françoise Dürr	6	6
(United States) Scott Davis (United States) Anna-Maria Fernandez	2	0
2	(South Africa) Frew McMillan (Netherlands) Betty Stöve	6	6

Quarterfinals
5	(United States) Bill Scanlon (United States) Martina Navratilova	1	6	6
(Mexico) Raúl Ramírez (West Germany) Bettina Bunge	6	1	4
(India) Anand Amritraj (France) Françoise Dürr	1	5
2	(South Africa) Frew McMillan (Netherlands) Betty Stöve	6	7

Semifinals
5	(United States) Bill Scanlon (United States) Martina Navratilova	6	3
2	(South Africa) Frew McMillan (Netherlands) Betty Stöve	7	6
