= 1978 US Open – Men's doubles =

Men's doubles
- 1978 US Open

Final
- Champion: (United States) Bob Lutz (United States) Stan Smith
- Runner-up: (United States) Marty Riessen (United States) Sherwood Stewart
- Score: 1–6, 7–5, 6–3

Details
- Draw: 64
- Seeds: 16

Events
Singles	men	women		boys	girls
Doubles	men	women	mixed	boys	girls
WC Singles	men	women	quad
WC Doubles	men	women	quad
Legends	men	women	mixed
← 1977 ·	US Open	· 1979 →

Bob Hewitt and Frew McMillan were the defending champions but lost in the quarterfinals to Marty Riessen and Sherwood Stewart.

Bob Lutz and Stan Smith won in the final 1–6, 7–5, 6–3 against Marty Riessen and Sherwood Stewart.

== Seeds ==
1. (South Africa) Bob Hewitt / (South Africa) Frew McMillan (quarterfinals)
2. (Poland) Wojtek Fibak / (Netherlands) Tom Okker (semifinals)
3. (United States) Bob Lutz / (United States) Stan Smith (champions)
4. (United States) Fred McNair / (Mexico) Raúl Ramírez (first round)
5. (United States) Brian Gottfried / (United States) Dick Stockton (quarterfinals)
6. (United States) Peter Fleming / (United States) John McEnroe (quarterfinals)
7. (Paraguay) Víctor Pecci / (Australia) Kim Warwick (quarterfinals)
8. (United States) Marty Riessen / (United States) Sherwood Stewart (final)
9. (Australia) John Alexander / (Australia) Phil Dent (third round)
10. (United States) Gene Mayer / (United States) Henry Pfister (second round)
11. (Switzerland) Colin Dowdeswell / (Australia) Chris Kachel (first round)
12. (Australia) Bob Carmichael / (Australia) Ray Ruffels (second round)
13. (South Africa) Raymond Moore / (United States) Roscoe Tanner (third round)
14. (Chile) Álvaro Fillol / (Chile) Jaime Fillol (first round)
15. (Australia) Ross Case / (Australia) Geoff Masters (third round)
16. (United States) Tim Gullikson / (United States) Tom Gullikson (third round)

== Draw ==
=== Key ===
- Q = Qualifier
- WC = Wild card
- LL = Lucky loser
- Alt = Alternate
- ITF = ITF entry
- PR = Protected ranking
- SR = Special ranking
- SE = Special exempt
- JE = Junior exempt
- JR = Junior Accelerator Programme entrant
- CO = College Accelerator Programme entrant
- NG = Next Gen Accelerator Program entrant
- w/o = Walkover
- r = Retired
- d = Defaulted

=== Finals ===
Quarterfinals
1	(South Africa) Bob Hewitt (South Africa) Frew McMillan	6	2	5
8	(United States) Marty Riessen (United States) Sherwood Stewart	2	6	7
(Australia) Mark Edmondson (Australia) John Marks	6	6
6	(United States) Peter Fleming (United States) John McEnroe	2	4
5	(United States) Brian Gottfried (United States) Dick Stockton	4	6	4
3	(United States) Bob Lutz (United States) Stan Smith	6	4	6
7	(Paraguay) Víctor Pecci (Australia) Kim Warwick	3	6	6
2	(Poland) Wojtek Fibak (Netherlands) Tom Okker	6	3	7

Semifinals
8	(United States) Marty Riessen (United States) Sherwood Stewart	6	6
(Australia) Mark Edmondson (Australia) John Marks	3	4
3	(United States) Bob Lutz (United States) Stan Smith	7	5	7
2	(Poland) Wojtek Fibak (Netherlands) Tom Okker	6	7	6

Final
8	(United States) Marty Riessen (United States) Sherwood Stewart	6	5	3
3	(United States) Bob Lutz (United States) Stan Smith	1	7	6

=== Top half ===
==== Section 1 ====
First round
1	(South Africa) B Hewitt (South Africa) F McMillan	7	7
(United States) J Borowiak (New Zealand) C Lewis	6	6
(United States) C Graebner (United States) C Pasarell	6	6
(United States) S Krulevitz (United States) B Manson	3	4
(Australia) J Newcombe (Australia) F Stolle	6	7
(Sweden) J Norbäck (Sweden) D Palm	3	6
(United States) B Martin (United States) B Scanlon	6	6
15	(Australia) R Case (Australia) G Masters	7	7
14	(Chile) Á Fillol (Chile) J Fillol	6	6
(South Africa) W Prinsloo (United Kingdom) J Smith	7	7
(United States) G Amaya (United States) A Lucchesi	2	4
(United States) A Kohlberg (United States) M Purcell	6	6
(United States) H Bunis (United States) C Hagey	3	7	3
(Canada) R Genois (United States) J Kriek	6	6	6
(India) A Amritraj (United States) J Whitlinger	3	7	1
8	(United States) M Riessen (United States) S Stewart	6	5	6

Second round
1	(South Africa) B Hewitt (South Africa) F McMillan	7	6
(United States) C Graebner (United States) C Pasarell	5	3
(Australia) J Newcombe (Australia) F Stolle	7	3	4
15	(Australia) R Case (Australia) G Masters	6	6	6
(South Africa) W Prinsloo (United Kingdom) J Smith	5	6
(United States) A Kohlberg (United States) M Purcell	7	7
(Canada) R Genois (United States) J Kriek	2	4
8	(United States) M Riessen (United States) S Stewart	6	6

Third round
1	(South Africa) B Hewitt (South Africa) F McMillan	6	6
15	(Australia) R Case (Australia) G Masters	3	3
(United States) A Kohlberg (United States) M Purcell	2	4
8	(United States) M Riessen (United States) S Stewart	6	6

Quarterfinals
1	(South Africa) B Hewitt (South Africa) F McMillan	6	2	5
8	(United States) M Riessen (United States) S Stewart	2	6	7

==== Section 2 ====
First round
4	(United States) F McNair (Mexico) R Ramírez	5	1
(Australia) M Edmondson (Australia) J Marks	7	6
(United States) T Leonard (United States) M Machette	6	7	7
(United States) C Sylvan (United States) B Walts	7	6	6
(United States) W Redondo (United States) B Rowe	4	4
(United States) A Ashe (France) Y Noah	6	6
(United States) M Greenberg (United States) M Shore	3	4
10	(United States) G Mayer (United States) H Pfister	6	6
12	(Australia) B Carmichael (Australia) R Ruffels	6	6
(United States) B Coleman (United States) R Pascale	3	1
(United States) V Amaya (United States) T Waltke	6	6
(Australia) B Drewett (Australia) A Gardiner	3	4
(Switzerland) H Günthardt (Czechoslovakia) T Šmíd	7	6
(India) A Amritraj (India) V Amritraj	6	4
(Spain) A Muñoz (Ecuador) R Ycaza	6	2
6	(United States) P Fleming (United States) J McEnroe	7	6

Second round
(Australia) M Edmondson (Australia) J Marks	7	6	7
(United States) T Leonard (United States) M Machette	6	7	6
(United States) A Ashe (France) Y Noah	6	7
10	(United States) G Mayer (United States) H Pfister	4	5
12	(Australia) B Carmichael (Australia) R Ruffels	3	1
(United States) V Amaya (United States) T Waltke	6	6
(Switzerland) H Günthardt (Czechoslovakia) T Šmíd	6	4
6	(United States) P Fleming (United States) J McEnroe	7	6

Third round
(Australia) M Edmondson (Australia) J Marks	6	6
(United States) A Ashe (France) Y Noah	3	1
(United States) V Amaya (United States) T Waltke	1	2
6	(United States) P Fleming (United States) J McEnroe	6	6

Quarterfinals
(Australia) M Edmondson (Australia) J Marks	6	6
6	(United States) P Fleming (United States) J McEnroe	2	4

=== Bottom half ===
==== Section 3 ====
First round
5	(United States) B Gottfried (United States) D Stockton	7	4	6
(United States) R Fagel (United States) B Seewagen	5	6	3
(United States) S Carnahan (United States) T Wilkison	6	6
(United States) S Bondurant (United States) B Willenborg	3	2
(South Africa) P Cramer (Paraguay) F González	6	2	2
(United States) D Ralston (United States) E van Dillen	3	6	6
(United Kingdom) R Drysdale (United States) V Winitsky	5	3
16	(United States) Tim Gullikson (United States) Tom Gullikson	7	6
9	(Australia) J Alexander (Australia) P Dent	7	7
(South Africa) C Drysdale (Rhodesia) A Pattison	6	6
(Australia) D Crealy (Australia) B Giltinan	6	6
(United States) W Brown (India) J Singh	3	1
(India) S Menon (United States) F Taygan	6	4	4
(United States) J Eagleton (South Africa) D Joubert	3	6	6
(United Kingdom) J Feaver (Australia) J James	5	4
3	(United States) B Lutz (United States) S Smith	7	6

Second round
5	(United States) B Gottfried (United States) D Stockton	6	6
(United States) S Carnahan (United States) T Wilkison	4	4
(United States) D Ralston (United States) E van Dillen	6	2	1
16	(United States) Tim Gullikson (United States) Tom Gullikson	4	6	6
9	(Australia) J Alexander (Australia) P Dent	6	6	6
(Australia) D Crealy (Australia) B Giltinan	7	3	3
(United States) J Eagleton (South Africa) D Joubert	1	2
3	(United States) B Lutz (United States) S Smith	6	6

Third round
5	(United States) B Gottfried (United States) D Stockton	7	7
16	(United States) Tim Gullikson (United States) Tom Gullikson	6	5
9	(Australia) J Alexander (Australia) P Dent	6	3	5
3	(United States) B Lutz (United States) S Smith	4	6	7

Quarterfinals
5	(United States) B Gottfried (United States) D Stockton	4	6	4
3	(United States) B Lutz (United States) S Smith	6	4	6

==== Section 4 ====
First round
7	(Paraguay) V Pecci (Australia) K Warwick	7	6
(Australia) D Collings (Australia) W Maher	6	2
(Australia) D Carter (United States) P DuPré	5	7	7
(United States) J Geraghty (South Africa) J Yuill	7	6	5
(United States) J DiLouie (United States) B Maze	6	6
(United States) M Cahill (United States) T Moor	7	7
(United States) M Fishbach (South Africa) B Mitton	6	7
11	(Switzerland) C Dowdeswell (Australia) C Kachel	3	5
13	(South Africa) R Moore (United States) R Tanner	7	6
(United States) E Friedler (United States) J Karzen	6	4
(South Africa) K Curren (United States) P Rennert	6	7
(Czechoslovakia) S Birner (Czechoslovakia) J Granát	3	6
(Australia) C Dibley (United States) B Teacher	7	6
(Australia) J Eagleton (United States) E Teltscher	5	2
(United States) T Graham (United States) J Sadri	6	3
2	(Poland) W Fibak (Netherlands) T Okker	7	6

Second round
7	(Paraguay) V Pecci (Australia) K Warwick	6	6
(Australia) D Carter (United States) P DuPré	1	2
(United States) M Cahill (United States) T Moor	2	6
(United States) M Fishbach (South Africa) B Mitton	6	7
13	(South Africa) R Moore (United States) R Tanner	6	6
(South Africa) K Curren (United States) P Rennert	0	4
(Australia) C Dibley (United States) B Teacher	4	6	3
2	(Poland) W Fibak (Netherlands) T Okker	6	3	6

Third round
7	(Paraguay) V Pecci (Australia) K Warwick	7	3	6
(United States) M Fishbach (South Africa) B Mitton	5	6	4
13	(South Africa) R Moore (United States) R Tanner	3	6	1
2	(Poland) W Fibak (Netherlands) T Okker	6	4	6

Quarterfinals
7	(Paraguay) V Pecci (Australia) K Warwick	3	6	6
2	(Poland) W Fibak (Netherlands) T Okker	6	3	7
