= 1978 US Open – Men's singles =

Men's singles
- 1978 US Open

Final
- Champion: (United States) Jimmy Connors
- Runner-up: (Sweden) Björn Borg
- Score: 6–4, 6–2, 6–2

Details
- Draw: 128 (14 Q )
- Seeds: 16

Events
Singles	men	women		boys	girls
Doubles	men	women	mixed	boys	girls
WC Singles	men	women	quad
WC Doubles	men	women	quad
Legends	men	women	mixed
- US Open

Jimmy Connors defeated Björn Borg in the final, 6–4, 6–2, 6–2 to win the men's singles tennis title at the 1978 US Open. It was his third US Open singles title and fifth major singles title overall. The final was watched by a sell-out crowd of 19,537 spectators.

Guillermo Vilas was the defending champion, but lost in the fourth round to Butch Walts.

The competition was played best-of-three sets in the first three rounds, followed by best-of-five sets from the fourth round onward.

This was the first edition of the US Open to be played on hardcourts, and the first to be held at the National Tennis Center in Flushing Meadows, relocating from its former site at Forest Hills.

== Seeds ==
The seeded players are listed below. Jimmy Connors is the champion; others show the round in which they were eliminated.

1. (Sweden) Björn Borg (finalist)
2. (United States) Jimmy Connors (champion)
3. (Argentina) Guillermo Vilas (fourth round)
4. (United States) Vitas Gerulaitis (semifinalist)
5. (United States) Eddie Dibbs (third round)
6. (United States) Brian Gottfried (quarterfinalist)
7. (Italy) Corrado Barazzutti (second round)
8. (Mexico) Raúl Ramírez (quarterfinalist)
9. (Spain) Manuel Orantes (first round)
10. (United States) Sandy Mayer (first round)
11. (United States) Roscoe Tanner (fourth round)
12. (United States) Harold Solomon (fourth round)
13. (Argentina) José Luis Clerc (third round)
14. (Poland) Wojtek Fibak (third round)
15. (United States) John McEnroe (semifinalist)
16. (United States) Arthur Ashe (fourth round)

== Draw ==
=== Key ===
- Q = Qualifier
- WC = Wild card
- LL = Lucky loser
- r = Retired

=== Final eight ===
Quarterfinals
1	(Sweden) Björn Borg	6^{6}	6	6	6
8	(Mexico) Raúl Ramírez	7^{8}	4	4	0
4	(United States) Vitas Gerulaitis	6	6	6
(South Africa) Johan Kriek	2	1	2
15	(United States) John McEnroe	6	6	7
(United States) Butch Walts	1	2	6
6	(United States) Brian Gottfried	2	6^{0}	1
2	(United States) Jimmy Connors	6	7^{7}	6

Semifinals
1	(Sweden) Björn Borg	6	6	7^{7}
4	(United States) Vitas Gerulaitis	3	2	6^{3}
15	(United States) John McEnroe	2	2	5
2	(United States) Jimmy Connors	6	6	7

Final
1	(Sweden) Björn Borg	4	2	2
2	(United States) Jimmy Connors	6	6	6

=== Section 1 ===
First round
1	(Sweden) Borg	6	6
(South Africa) Hewitt	0	2
(Switzerland) Günthardt	6	7
(Australia) Masters	3	6
(United States) Leonard	5	6
(South Africa) Mitton	7	7
(United Kingdom) Cox	6	6
(Czechoslovakia) Birner	3	2
(Spain) Muñoz	6	3
(Italy) Ocleppo	7	6
(United States) Borowiak	6	6
(Mexico) Lara	4	3
Q	(India) Menon	0	6	2
(United States) Mayer	6	3	6
(United States) Hardie	3	1
12	(United States) Solomon	6	6

Second round
1	(Sweden) Borg	6	6
(Switzerland) Günthardt	2	4
(South Africa) Mitton	6	7
(United Kingdom) Cox	4	5
(Italy) Ocleppo	6	6
(United States) Borowiak	4	0
(United States) Mayer	4	2
12	(United States) Solomon	6	6

Third round
1	(Sweden) Borg	4	6	6
(South Africa) Mitton	6	4	2
(Italy) Ocleppo	2	1
12	(United States) Solomon	6	6

Fourth round
1	(Sweden) Borg	6	6	6
12	(United States) Solomon	2	2	0

=== Section 2 ===
First round
16	(United States) Ashe	4	7	6
(Australia) Case	6	6	1
(South Africa) McMillan	5	1
(Czechoslovakia) Granát	7	6
Q	(United States) Malin	6	4
Q	(United States) Graham	7	6
(France) Noah	7	6	5
(United States) Moor	6	7	7
(United States) Gullikson	4	2
(South Africa) Moore	6	6
(United Kingdom) Lloyd	6	3	6
(United Kingdom) Mottram	1	6	1
(Australia) Ruffels	2	2
(Australia) Carter	6	6
(Australia) Alexander	6	6	3
8	(Mexico) Ramírez	3	7	6

Second round
16	(United States) Ashe	6	6
(Czechoslovakia) Granát	2	3
Q	(United States) Graham	6	4	2
(United States) Moor	4	6	6
(South Africa) Moore	4	3
(United Kingdom) Lloyd	6	6
(Australia) Carter	3	1
8	(Mexico) Ramírez	6	6

Third round
16	(United States) Ashe	6	6
(United States) Moor	3	4
(United Kingdom) Lloyd	2	3
8	(Mexico) Ramírez	6	6

Fourth round
16	(United States) Ashe	4	6	6	6	2
8	(Mexico) Ramírez	6	4	3	7	6

=== Section 3 ===
First round
4	(United States) Gerulaitis	7	7
(France) Portes	5	5
(United States) Amaya	7	4	6
(United States) Richey	5	6	3
(Australia) Crealy	6	7	6
(United States) Martin	7	5	0
(Netherlands) Okker	6	6	3
(Rhodesia) Pattison	7	4	6
(Chile) Acuña	0	3
(United States) Pfister	6	6
(New Zealand) Lewis	0	1
(United States) Lutz	6	6
Q	(South Africa) Curren	6	6
(Australia) Collings	4	1
(United States) Cahill	6	6	1
13	(Argentina) Clerc	7	3	6

Second round
4	(United States) Gerulaitis	6	6	6
(United States) Amaya	2	7	3
(Australia) Crealy	7	6	2
(Rhodesia) Pattison	4	7	6
(United States) Pfister	4	2
(United States) Lutz	6	6
Q	(South Africa) Curren	6	3
13	(Argentina) Clerc	7	6

Third round
4	(United States) Gerulaitis	6	3	7
(Rhodesia) Pattison	4	6	5
(United States) Lutz	6	6
13	(Argentina) Clerc	3	2

Fourth round
4	(United States) Gerulaitis	4	6	6	6
(United States) Lutz	6	4	3	4

=== Section 4 ===
First round
10	(United States) Mayer	6	2
(Canada) Genois	7	6
(Colombia) Betancur	6	6	6
(United States) Saviano	7	1	4
Q	(United States) Fagel	7	5	3
Q	(Austria) Feigl	6	0	2^{r}
(South Africa) Kriek	7	7
Q	(United States) DiLouie	6	6
(South Africa) Joubert	5	0
(United States) Teacher	7	6
Q	(United States) Manson	4	7	6
Q	(United States) Turpin	6	5	3
(Hungary) Taróczy	6	6
(United States) Amaya	2	2
(United States) Fishbach	6	2
5	(United States) Dibbs	7	6

Second round
(Canada) Genois	6	6
(Colombia) Betancur	2	3
Q	(United States) Fagel	2	7	3
(South Africa) Kriek	6	6	6
(United States) Teacher	6	6
Q	(United States) Manson	4	4
(Hungary) Taróczy	6	6	3
5	(United States) Dibbs	7	4	6

Third round
(Canada) Genois	2	6
(South Africa) Kriek	6	7
(United States) Teacher	6	5	6
5	(United States) Dibbs	2	7	3

Fourth round
(South Africa) Kriek	7	6	7
(United States) Teacher	6	3	6

=== Section 5 ===
First round
7	(Italy) Barazzutti	6	6
(New Zealand) Simpson	0	4
(United States) Sadri	6	6
(Bolivia) Benavides	4	2
(Australia) Warwick	7	6	3
(Switzerland) Dowdeswell	6	7	6
(United States) Purcell	5	0
Q	(United States) Waltke	7	6
(Czechoslovakia) Šmid	4	6	6
(Australia) Giltinan	6	3	0
(United States) Pasarell	1	1
(United States) Fleming	6	6
(Chile) Fillol Sr.	6	6	6
(Sweden) Johansson	1	7	4
(United States) Stewart	6	4
15	(United States) McEnroe	7	6

Second round
7	(Italy) Barazzutti	5	6	2
(United States) Sadri	7	4	6
(Switzerland) Dowdeswell	6	3	6
Q	(United States) Waltke	4	6	3
(Czechoslovakia) Šmid	7	4	0
(United States) Fleming	6	6	6
(Chile) Fillol Sr.	4	7	1
15	(United States) McEnroe	6	6	6

Third round
(United States) Sadri	2	6	3
(Switzerland) Dowdeswell	6	3	6
(United States) Fleming	4	1
15	(United States) McEnroe	6	6

Fourth round
(Switzerland) Dowdeswell	6	3	3
15	(United States) McEnroe	7	6	6

=== Section 6 ===
First round
14	(Poland) Fibak	6	6
(Paraguay) González	3	3
(India) Amritraj	6	1
(United Kingdom) Drysdale	7	6
(France) Moretton	4	2
(United States) Walts	6	6
Q	(United States) Fisher	6	6
(United States) Friedler	3	3
(United States) Dowlen	4	4
(Sweden) Bengtson	6	6
Q	(South Africa) Yuill	6	4
(United States) Smith	7	6
(France) Goven	4	4
(United States) Scanlon	6	6
(South Africa) Drysdale	5	2
3	(Argentina) Vilas	7	6

Second round
14	(Poland) Fibak	6	6
(United Kingdom) Drysdale	4	2
(United States) Walts	7	7
Q	(United States) Fisher	5	5
(Sweden) Bengtson	2	2
(United States) Smith	6	6
(United States) Scanlon	7	4	3
3	(Argentina) Vilas	5	6	6

Third round
14	(Poland) Fibak	4	5
(United States) Walts	6	7
(United States) Smith	4	6	3
3	(Argentina) Vilas	6	3	6

Fourth round
(United States) Walts	6	7	4	6	6
3	(Argentina) Vilas	4	6	6	7	2

=== Section 7 ===
First round
6	(United States) Gottfried	7	7
(Australia) Dent	5	5
(United States) Winitsky	3	7	3
(United States) Van Dillen	6	6	6
(United States) Stockton	6	6	6
(India) Amritraj	3	7	4
(South Africa) Prinsloo	6	6
(United States) Garcia	4	3
(United States) Teltscher	6	6
(Canada) Halder	1	0
(United States) Iskersky	6	6
(Ecuador) Ycaza	4	2
(United States) Taygan	3	3
(Paraguay) Pecci Sr.	6	6
Q	(South Africa) Schneider	1	4
11	(United States) Tanner	6	6

Second round
6	(United States) Gottfried	6	6
(United States) Van Dillen	1	0
(United States) Stockton	6	7
(South Africa) Prinsloo	1	5
(United States) Teltscher	4	6	6
(United States) Iskersky	6	3	4
(Paraguay) Pecci Sr.	3	6	6
11	(United States) Tanner	6	4	7

Third round
6	(United States) Gottfried	6	6
(United States) Stockton	3	1
(United States) Teltscher	6	2
11	(United States) Tanner	7	6

Fourth round
6	(United States) Gottfried	6	6	6
11	(United States) Tanner	2	4	1

=== Section 8 ===
First round
9	(Spain) Orantes	1^{r}
(Italy) Panatta	4
(United States) Gorman	6	6	4
Q	(United States) Nichols	4	7	6
(Australia) Edmondson	1	4
(Australia) James	6	6
(United States) Riessen	3	6	7
(United States) Wilkison	6	4	6
(United States) DuPré	6	6
(Australia) Dibley	4	4
(France) Freyss	6	6
(France) Dominguez	4	4
(Chile) Fillol	2	0
(Australia) Docherty	6	6
(United States) Gullikson	0	2
2	(United States) Connors	6	6

Second round
(Italy) Panatta	6	6
Q	(United States) Nichols	2	4
(Australia) James	1	6	3
(United States) Riessen	6	3	6
(United States) DuPré	6	6
(France) Freyss	2	3
(Australia) Docherty	1	3
2	(United States) Connors	6	6

Third round
(Italy) Panatta	3	6	7
(United States) Riessen	6	3	5
(United States) DuPré	5	6	3
2	(United States) Connors	7	4	6

Fourth round
(Italy) Panatta	6	4	1	6	5
2	(United States) Connors	4	6	6	1	7

Preceded by 1978 Wimbledon Championships – Men's singles	Grand Slam men's singles	Succeeded by 1978 Australian Open – Men's singles
