= 1978 US Open – Mixed doubles =

Mixed doubles
- 1978 US Open

Final
- Champions: (South Africa) Frew McMillan (Netherlands) Betty Stöve
- Runners-up: (United States) Billie Jean King (Australia) Ray Ruffels
- Score: 6–3, 7–6

Details
- Draw: 40
- Seeds: 4

Events
Singles	men	women		boys	girls
Doubles	men	women	mixed	boys	girls
WC Singles	men	women	quad
WC Doubles	men	women	quad
Legends	men	women	mixed
- US Open

Frew McMillan and Betty Stöve were the defending champions and successfully defended their title, defeating Billie Jean King and Ray Ruffels in the final, 6–3, 7–6.

== Seeds ==
1. (South Africa) Frew McMillan / (Netherlands) Betty Stöve (champions)
2. (Australia) Ray Ruffels / (United States) Billie Jean King (final)
3. (Australia) Bob Hewitt / (Australia) Wendy Turnbull (semifinals)
4. (Australia) Chris Kachel / (South Africa) Ilana Kloss (third round)

== Draw ==
Key

- Q = Qualifier
- WC = Wild card
- LL = Lucky loser
- Alt = Alternate
- ITF = ITF entry
- PR = Protected ranking
- SR = Special ranking
- SE = Special exempt
- JE = Junior exempt
- JR = Junior Accelerator Programme entrant
- CO = College Accelerator Programme entrant
- NG = Next Gen Accelerator Program entrant
- w/o = Walkover
- r = Retired
- d = Defaulted

=== Finals ===
Quarterfinals
2	(Australia) Ray Ruffels (United States) Billie Jean King	6	6
(Australia) Bob Carmichael (United States) JoAnne Russell	0	1
(India) Anand Amritraj (France) Françoise Dürr	6	7	3
(United States) Stan Smith (United States) Anne Smith	7	6	6
(United States) Tom Leonard (United States) Pam Teeguarden	7	4	3
3	(Australia) Bob Hewitt (Australia) Wendy Turnbull	6	6	6
(New Zealand) Chris Lewis (Sweden) Helena Anliot	6	0	2
1	(South Africa) Frew McMillan (Netherlands) Betty Stöve	3	6	6

Semifinals
2	(Australia) Ray Ruffels (United States) Billie Jean King	7	6
(United States) Stan Smith (United States) Anne Smith	6	4
3	(Australia) Bob Hewitt (Australia) Wendy Turnbull	6	6	2
1	(South Africa) Frew McMillan (Netherlands) Betty Stöve	4	7	6

Final
2	(Australia) Ray Ruffels (United States) Billie Jean King	3	6
1	(South Africa) Frew McMillan (Netherlands) Betty Stöve	6	7

=== Top half ===
==== Section 1 ====
First round

Second round
2	(Australia) R Ruffels (United States) BJ King	6	6	6
(Switzerland) C Dowdeswell (United States) B Nagelsen	4	7	3
(United States) P Rennert (United States) B Newfield	5	2
(Australia) K Warwick (Czechoslovakia) R Maršíková	7	6
(Australia) B Carmichael (United States) J Russell	6	6
(United States) J Kriek (South Africa) B Cuypers	4	2
(United States) B Walts (United States) K Shaw	w/o
(India) S Menon (United States) J Nachand

Third round
2	(Australia) R Ruffels (United States) BJ King	7	6
(Australia) K Warwick (Czechoslovakia) R Maršíková	6	3
(Australia) B Carmichael (United States) J Russell	6	7
(United States) B Walts (United States) K Shaw	4	5

Quarterfinals
2	(Australia) R Ruffels (United States) BJ King	6	6
(Australia) B Carmichael (United States) J Russell	0	1

==== Section 2 ====
First round
(India) A Amritraj (United States) A Kiyomura	6	3	2
(United States) J McEnroe (United States) S Margolin	4	6	6
(United States) J Van Linge (United States) G Glasgow	6	6	6
(United States) G Malin (United States) B Hallquist	7	3	4
(United States) R Reid (Australia) K Reid
(Australia) F Stolle (United States) J Anthony	w/o
(United States) S Smith (United States) A Smith	6	7
(United States) J Whitlinger (Australia) D Fromholtz	3	6

Second round
4	(Australia) C Kachel (South Africa) I Kloss	6	3	6
(United States) V Winitsky (United States) R Fox	2	6	2
(United States) B Smith (United States) T Holladay	1	3
(India) A Amritraj (France) F Dürr	6	6
(United States) J McEnroe (United States) S Margolin	6	6
(United States) J Van Linge (United States) G Glasgow	3	4
(Australia) F Stolle (United States) J Anthony	4	2
(United States) S Smith (United States) A Smith	6	6

Third round
4	(Australia) C Kachel (South Africa) I Kloss	2	4
(India) A Amritraj (France) F Dürr	6	6
(United States) J McEnroe (United States) S Margolin	4	7	3
(United States) S Smith (United States) A Smith	6	6	6

Quarterfinals
(India) A Amritraj (France) F Dürr	6	7	3
(United States) S Smith (United States) A Smith	7	6	6

=== Bottom half ===
==== Section 3 ====
First round
(Australia) J Marks (Czechoslovakia) R Tomanová	6	7
(United States) B Seewagen (United Kingdom) L Beaven	3	6
(United States) T Leonard (United States) P Teeguarden	w/o
(Czechoslovakia) I Lendl (Czechoslovakia) H Strachoňová
(United States) F McNair (Australia) L Hunt
(United States) R Fagel (Argentina) C Casabianca	w/o
(Australia) D Crealy (United States) P Shriver	6	6	6
(Paraguay) V Pecci (Romania) V Ruzici	7	2	1

Second round
(Australia) J Marks (Czechoslovakia) R Tomanová	6	2	4
(United States) T Leonard (United States) P Teeguarden	2	6	6
(United States) R Fagel (Argentina) C Casabianca	1	2
(Australia) D Crealy (United States) P Shriver	6	6
(Australia) W Lloyd (United States) P Bostrom
(United States) S Denton (United States) B Jordan	w/o
(Paraguay) F González (United States) A Spex
3	(Australia) B Hewitt (Australia) W Turnbull	w/o

Third round
(United States) T Leonard (United States) P Teeguarden	w/o
(Australia) D Crealy (United States) P Shriver
(United States) S Denton (United States) B Jordan	2	6	6
3	(Australia) B Hewitt (Australia) W Turnbull	6	4	7

Quarterfinals
(United States) T Leonard (United States) P Teeguarden	7	4	3
3	(Australia) B Hewitt (Australia) W Turnbull	6	6	6

==== Section 4 ====
First round

Second round
(New Zealand) C Lewis (Sweden) H Anliot	6	6
(United Kingdom) R Drysdale (Australia) K Ruddell	2	2
(United States) J Lucas (United States) R Richards	6	2	6
(Australia) P Dent (Australia) S Leo	4	6	4
(United States) A Lucchesi (United States) M Louie	6	6	7
(United States) H Reid (United States) D Desfor	2	7	6
(Australia) M Edmondson (Australia) C O'Neil	4	2
1	(South Africa) F McMillan (Netherlands) Betty Stöve	6	6

Third round
(New Zealand) C Lewis (Sweden) H Anliot	6	7
(United States) J Lucas (United States) R Richards	2	6
(United States) A Lucchesi (United States) M Louie	4	4
1	(South Africa) F McMillan (Netherlands) Betty Stöve	6	6

Quarterfinals
(New Zealand) C Lewis (Sweden) H Anliot	6	0	2
1	(South Africa) F McMillan (Netherlands) Betty Stöve	3	6	6
