= Jon Molin =

American tennis player

- Country (sports): United States
- Born: October 20, 1956 (age 69)

Singles
- Career record: 0–1
- Highest ranking: No. 248 (January 3, 1979)

Grand Slam singles results
- US Open: 1R (1979)

Doubles
- Career record: 1–2

Grand Slam doubles results
- US Open: 2R (1979)

Grand Slam mixed doubles results
- US Open: 1R (1979)

Jon Molin (born October 20, 1956) is an American former professional tennis player.

Molin, raised in New York City, was a collegiate tennis player for Columbia University and had a stint as the team's captain. He featured in the singles and doubles main draws at the 1979 US Open. A qualifier in the singles, he lost his first round match to Gene Malin in four sets. He had a best singles world ranking of 248.
