= 1979 US Open – Men's singles =

Men's singles
- 1979 US Open

Final
- Champion: (United States) John McEnroe
- Runner-up: (United States) Vitas Gerulaitis
- Score: 7–5, 6–3, 6–3

Details
- Draw: 128 (14 Q )
- Seeds: 16

Events
| Singles | men | women | | boys | girls |
| Doubles | men | women | mixed | boys | girls |
| WC Singles | men | women | quad |
| WC Doubles | men | women | quad |
| Legends | men | women | mixed |
- US Open

John McEnroe defeated Vitas Gerulaitis in the final, 7–5, 6–3, 6–3 to win the men's singles tennis title at the 1979 US Open. It was his first major singles title.

Jimmy Connors was the defending champion, but was defeated in the semifinals by McEnroe. Connors' loss ended a record streak of five consecutive US Open finals (later surpassed by Ivan Lendl's eight consecutive US Open finals).

During the second round, Ilie Năstase was defaulted from his match against McEnroe. The umpire had docked Năstase a point in the third set and then a game in the fourth for arguing and stalling. A near riot followed as the crowd disagreed with the umpire's decision, by throwing beer cans and cups on court. The match was eventually restarted with the umpire being replaced before McEnroe came out the winner. McEnroe did not have to play in the third round (a walkover against John Lloyd) and only had to play three games in the quarterfinals (retirement by Eddie Dibbs). The final was the first all-American men's singles final in the open era.

== Seeds ==
The seeded players are listed below. John McEnroe is the champion; others show the round in which they were eliminated.

1. (Sweden) Björn Borg (quarterfinalist)
2. (United States) Jimmy Connors (semifinalist)
3. (United States) John McEnroe (champion)
4. (United States) Vitas Gerulaitis (finalist)
5. (United States) Roscoe Tanner (semifinalist)
6. (Argentina) Guillermo Vilas (fourth round)
7. (United States) Harold Solomon (fourth round)
8. (Paraguay) Víctor Pecci Sr. (third round)
9. (United States) Eddie Dibbs (quarterfinalist)
10. (Argentina) José Luis Clerc (fourth round)
11. (United States) Brian Gottfried (fourth round)
12. (Poland) Wojtek Fibak (second round)
13. (United States) Gene Mayer (third round)
14. (United States) Tim Gullikson (fourth round)
15. (Italy) Adriano Panatta (first round)
16. (Australia) John Alexander (second round)

== Draw ==
=== Key ===
- Q = Qualifier
- WC = Wild card
- LL = Lucky loser
- r = Retired

=== Final eight ===
Quarterfinals
1 | (Sweden) Björn Borg | 2 | 6 | 2 | 6^{2}
5 | (United States) Roscoe Tanner | 6 | 4 | 6 | 7^{7}
4 | (United States) Vitas Gerulaitis | 5 | 6 | 6 | 6
(South Africa) Johan Kriek | 7 | 3 | 4 | 3
9 | (United States) Eddie Dibbs | 1^{r}
3 | (United States) John McEnroe | 2
(United States) Pat DuPré | 2 | 1 | 1
2 | (United States) Jimmy Connors | 6 | 6 | 6

Semifinals
5 | (United States) Roscoe Tanner | 6 | 6 | 6^{5} | 3 | 3
4 | (United States) Vitas Gerulaitis | 3 | 2 | 7^{7} | 6 | 6
3 | (United States) John McEnroe | 6 | 6 | 7
2 | (United States) Jimmy Connors | 3 | 3 | 5

Final
4 | (United States) Vitas Gerulaitis | 5 | 3 | 3
3 | (United States) John McEnroe | 7 | 6 | 6

=== Section 1 ===
First round
1 | (Sweden) Borg | 6 | 6 | 6
(United States) Mitchell | 1 | 1 | 2
(United Kingdom) Cox | 6 | 3 | 7 | 2 | 1
Q | (Australia) Carter | 0 | 6 | 5 | 6 | 6
(United States) Fleming | 7 | 6 | 0 | 6
(Netherlands) Okker | 6 | 4 | 6 | 3
(France) Bedel | 6 | 1 | 6 | 2
(Chile) Fillol Sr. | 4 | 6 | 7 | 6
(United States) Rennert | 4 | 3 | 4
Q | (United States) Foxworth | 6 | 6 | 6
(Ecuador) Ycaza | 1 | 2 | 0
(United States) Stockton | 6 | 6 | 6
(United States) Richardson | 3 | 6 | 6 | 1 | 6
Q | (United States) Siegler | 6 | 3 | 1 | 6 | 3
(South Africa) Curren | 6 | 7 | 7
15 | (Italy) Panatta | 3 | 5 | 6

Second round
1 | (Sweden) Borg | 6 | 6 | 6
Q | (Australia) Carter | 1 | 1 | 1
(United States) Fleming | 1 | 7 | 2 | 2
(Chile) Fillol Sr. | 6 | 5 | 6 | 6
Q | (United States) Foxworth | 3 | 6 | 3 | 6
(United States) Stockton | 6 | 4 | 6 | 7
(United States) Richardson | 7 | 6 | 7
(South Africa) Curren | 5 | 4 | 5

Third round
1 | (Sweden) Borg | 6 | 6 | 6
(Chile) Fillol Sr. | 0 | 3 | 2
(United States) Stockton | 7 | 6 | 6
(United States) Richardson | 6 | 3 | 3

Fourth round
1 | (Sweden) Borg | 6 | 1 | 7 | 7
(United States) Stockton | 4 | 6 | 6 | 5

=== Section 2 ===
First round
14 | (United States) Gullikson | 6 | 3 | 6 | 6
(United States) Teltscher | 4 | 6 | 4 | 4
Q | (United States) Garcia | 6 | 4 | 5
(Rhodesia) Pattison | 7 | 6 | 7
(United Kingdom) Mottram | 4 | 7 | 6 | 7
Q | (United States) Van't Hof | 6 | 5 | 4 | 6
(South Africa) Schneider | 6 | 7 | 4 | 3 | 1
(Czechoslovakia) Kodeš | 3 | 5 | 6 | 6 | 6
(Australia) Drewett | 3 | 2 | 3
(Australia) James | 6 | 6 | 6
(United States) Saviano | 6 | 4 | 7 | 0 | 4
(United States) Teacher | 1 | 6 | 6 | 6 | 4r
(United States) Van Patten | 4 | 1 | 0
(Czechoslovakia) Lendl | 6 | 6 | 6
(Australia) Marks | 4 | 2 | 0
5 | (United States) Tanner | 6 | 6 | 6

Second round
14 | (United States) Gullikson | 6 | 6 | 7
(Rhodesia) Pattison | 3 | 2 | 6
(United Kingdom) Mottram | 6 | 7 | 6
(Czechoslovakia) Kodeš | 3 | 6 | 2
(Australia) James | 3 | 7 | 4 | 6
(United States) Saviano | 6 | 5 | 6 | 7
(Czechoslovakia) Lendl | 3 | 2 | 1
5 | (United States) Tanner | 6 | 6 | 6

Third round
14 | (United States) Gullikson | 3 | 6 | 6 | 6
(United Kingdom) Mottram | 6 | 3 | 4 | 2
(United States) Saviano | 4 | 4 | 6 | 3
5 | (United States) Tanner | 6 | 6 | 3 | 6

Fourth round
14 | (United States) Gullikson | 3 | 4 | 5
5 | (United States) Tanner | 6 | 6 | 7

=== Section 3 ===
First round
4 | (United States) Gerulaitis | 6 | 6 | 7
(Australia) Edmondson | 3 | 2 | 5
(United States) Taygan | 7 | 6 | 6
Q | (United States) Leonard | 6 | 4 | 3
(United States) Martin | 5 | 1 | 6 | 7 | 4
(New Zealand) Simpson | 7 | 6 | 1 | 5 | 6
(France) Portes | 2 | 3 | 4
(United States) Smith | 6 | 6 | 6
(United States) Fisher | 6 | 3 | 2 | 4
Q | (South Africa) Trogolo | 1 | 6 | 6 | 6
Q | (Sweden) Norbäck | 7 | 6 | 6 | 7
(United States) Kleege | 6 | 7 | 1 | 6
(United States) Purcell | 5 | 6 | 6 | 6
(France) Moretton | 7 | 2 | 4 | 3
Q | (United States) Nichols | 1 | 0 | 4
10 | (Argentina) Clerc | 6 | 6 | 6

Second round
4 | (United States) Gerulaitis | 6 | 6 | 6
(United States) Taygan | 2 | 3 | 3
(New Zealand) Simpson | 2 | 1 | 3
(United States) Smith | 6 | 6 | 6
Q | (South Africa) Trogolo | 6 | 2 | 6 | 6
Q | (Sweden) Norbäck | 4 | 6 | 2 | 2
(United States) Purcell | 2 | 6 | 4
10 | (Argentina) Clerc | 6 | 7 | 6

Third round
4 | (United States) Gerulaitis | 7 | 7 | 6
(United States) Smith | 6 | 6 | 3
Q | (South Africa) Trogolo | 6 | 1 | 1 | 1
10 | (Argentina) Clerc | 4 | 6 | 6 | 6

Fourth round
4 | (United States) Gerulaitis | 7 | 6 | 6
10 | (Argentina) Clerc | 6 | 2 | 2

=== Section 4 ===
First round
12 | (Poland) Fibak | 7 | 7 | 6
(Australia) Carmichael | 6 | 5 | 2
(France) Noah | 6 | 6 | 4 | 7
Q | (South Africa) Cramer | 3 | 0 | 6 | 6
(France) Dominguez | 0 | 1 | 6
(United States) Krulevitz | 6 | 6 | 7
(New Zealand) Lewis | 3 | 2 | 1
(United States) Walts | 6 | 6 | 6
(India) Krishnan | 6 | 6 | 6
(Australia) Dent | 3 | 0 | 3
(South Africa) Kriek | 6 | 6 | 4 | 0 | 6
(Colombia) Molina | 0 | 4 | 6 | 6 | 3
(Ecuador) Gómez | 3 | 3 | 6 | 6 | 6
(United States) Lapidus | 6 | 6 | 3 | 4 | 2
(United States) Kohlberg | 6 | 4 | 7 | 3 | 4
8 | (Paraguay) Pecci Sr. | 3 | 6 | 5 | 6 | 6

Second round
12 | (Poland) Fibak | 4 | 4 | 6
(France) Noah | 6 | 6 | 7
(United States) Krulevitz | 3 | 6 | 6 | 0 | 2
(United States) Walts | 6 | 3 | 4 | 6 | 6
(India) Krishnan | 5 | 2 | 3
(South Africa) Kriek | 7 | 6 | 6
(Ecuador) Gómez | 2 | 2 | 4
8 | (Paraguay) Pecci Sr. | 6 | 6 | 6

Third round
(France) Noah | 7 | 6 | 6
(United States) Walts | 6 | 3 | 2
(South Africa) Kriek | 6 | 6 | 6
8 | (Paraguay) Pecci Sr. | 3 | 2 | 0

Fourth round
(France) Noah | 3 | 6 | 6 | 6 | 4
(South Africa) Kriek | 6 | 7 | 4 | 1 | 6

=== Section 5 ===
First round
6 | (Argentina) Vilas | 6 | 6 | 7
(New Zealand) Parun | 1 | 2 | 6
(United States) Lutz | 6 | 6 | 1 | r
(Bolivia) Benavides | 1 | 7 | 2
(United States) Bailey | 6 | 5 | 6 | 3 | 6
(Sweden) Bengtson | 4 | 7 | 4 | 6 | 4
(Switzerland) Dowdeswell | 7 | 4 | 6 | 3 | 4
(United States) Van Dillen | 6 | 6 | 2 | 6 | 6
(South Africa) Mitton | 6 | 6 | 6
(United States) Amaya | 2 | 1 | 4
(United States) Crawford | 6 | 4 | 3 | 3
(United States) Stewart | 4 | 6 | 6 | 6
Q | (United States) Molin | 0 | 7 | 0 | 4
(United States) Malin | 6 | 6 | 6 | 6
(United States) Wilkison | 6 | 6 | 5 | 2 | 3
9 | (United States) Dibbs | 4 | 2 | 7 | 6 | 6

Second round
6 | (Argentina) Vilas | 6 | 6 | 6
(Bolivia) Benavides | 1 | 1 | 0
(United States) Bailey | 3 | 4 | 2
(United States) Van Dillen | 6 | 6 | 6
(South Africa) Mitton | 6 | 6 | 6
(United States) Stewart | 1 | 3 | 2
(United States) Malin | 1 | 6 | 5 | 2
9 | (United States) Dibbs | 6 | 1 | 7 | 6

Third round
6 | (Argentina) Vilas | 2 | 7 | 6 | 6 | 6
(United States) Van Dillen | 6 | 5 | 7 | 2 | 1
(South Africa) Mitton | 4 | 2 | 3
9 | (United States) Dibbs | 6 | 6 | 6

Fourth round
6 | (Argentina) Vilas | 3 | 7 | 5 | 1
9 | (United States) Dibbs | 6 | 5 | 7 | 6

=== Section 6 ===
First round
16 | (Australia) Alexander | 6 | 7 | 7
(United States) Schoenfield | 1 | 5 | 5
(United States) Pfister | 6 | 6 | 6
(Australia) Docherty | 4 | 3 | 3
(Australia) Rocavert | 6 | 6 | 7
(Australia) Warwick | 0 | 1 | 6
(United States) Gorman | 6 | 7 | 6
(United States) Owens | 2 | 5 | 4
Q | (United States) Pasarell | 1 | 3 | 7 | 1
(United Kingdom) Lloyd | 6 | 6 | 6 | 6
(Brazil) Barbosa | 4 | 0 | 4
(Australia) McNamee | 6 | 6 | 6
(Romania) Năstase | 7 | 7
Q | (Finland) Palin | 5 | 5 | r
(Czechoslovakia) Složil | 1 | 2 | 4
3 | (United States) McEnroe | 6 | 6 | 6

Second round
16 | (Australia) Alexander | 3 | 4 | 6 | 6 | 1
(United States) Pfister | 6 | 6 | 3 | 4 | 6
(Australia) Rocavert | 1 | 2 | 2
(United States) Gorman | 6 | 6 | 6
(United Kingdom) Lloyd | 5 | 6 | 7 | 7 | 7
(Australia) McNamee | 7 | 7 | 5 | 6 | 6
(Romania) Năstase | 4 | 6 | 3 | 2
3 | (United States) McEnroe | 6 | 4 | 6 | 6

Third round
(United States) Pfister | 6 | 4 | 3 | 4
(United States) Gorman | 4 | 6 | 6 | 6
(United Kingdom) Lloyd | w/o
3 | (United States) McEnroe

Fourth round
(United States) Gorman | 2 | 4 | 1
3 | (United States) McEnroe | 6 | 6 | 6

=== Section 7 ===
First round
7 | (United States) Solomon | 6 | 6 | 6
(Uruguay) Damiani | 4 | 0 | 3
(United States) Austin | 2 | 7 | 7 | 1 | 6
Q | (United States) Mayotte | 6 | 6 | 5 | 6 | 3
(South Africa) Moore | 4
(United States) Borowiak | 3 | r
(Czechoslovakia) Hřebec | 6 | 7 | 7
(Argentina) Álvarez | 1 | 5 | 5
(United States) Du Pré | 7 | 7 | 0 | 6
(Mexico) Ramírez | 6 | 5 | 6 | 2
(United States) Scanlon | 3 | 3 | 6 | 3 | 3
(Czechoslovakia) Šmid | 6 | 6 | 2 | 6 | 6
(United States) Gullikson | 6 | 6 | 6
(South Africa) Prinsloo | 3 | 4 | 2
(United States) Shore | 1 | 3 | 0
13 | (United States) Mayer | 6 | 6 | 6

Second round
7 | (United States) Solomon | 6 | 6 | 6
(United States) Austin | 3 | 0 | 4
(South Africa) Moore | 7 | 5
(Czechoslovakia) Hřebec | 6 | 0 | r
(United States) Du Pré | 6 | 6 | 1 | 6
(Czechoslovakia) Šmid | 2 | 2 | 6 | 3
(United States) Gullikson | 4 | 5 | 1
13 | (United States) Mayer | 6 | 7 | 6

Third round
7 | (United States) Solomon | 6 | 6 | 7
(South Africa) Moore | 3 | 0 | 5
(United States) Du Pré | 7 | 6 | 6
13 | (United States) Mayer | 5 | 2 | 3

Fourth round
7 | (United States) Solomon | 6 | 3 | 2 | 6 | 4
(United States) Du Pré | 3 | 6 | 6 | 4 | 6

=== Section 8 ===
First round
11 | (United States) Gottfried | 6 | 6 | 6
(United States) Winitsky | 4 | 2 | 4
(Australia) Gardiner | 5 | 2 | 3
(United States) Riessen | 7 | 6 | 6
(United States) Sadri | 6 | 7 | 6
(United States) Fromm | 1 | 5 | 3
(United States) Amaya | 7 | 6 | 6
(United States) Buehning | 5 | 1 | 2
(United States) Fagel | 6 | 6 | 0 | 3 | 3
(United States) Manson | 4 | 4 | 6 | 6 | 6
(Australia) Case | 7 | 6 | 2 | 5 | 2
(Paraguay) González | 5 | 3 | 6 | 7 | 6
(United States) Meyer | 3 | 4 | 1
(India) Amritraj | 6 | 6 | 6
(India) Amritraj | 2 | 4 | 4
2 | (United States) Connors | 6 | 6 | 6

Second round
11 | (United States) Gottfried | 6 | 5 | 7 | 5 | 6
(United States) Riessen | 3 | 7 | 5 | 7 | 4
(United States) Sadri | 4 | 1 | 4
(United States) Amaya | 6 | 6 | 6
(United States) Manson | 2 | 6 | 6 | 6
(Paraguay) González | 6 | 2 | 2 | 3
(India) Amritraj | 6^{6} | 5 | r
2 | (United States) Connors | 7^{8} | 7

Third round
11 | (United States) Gottfried | 6 | 4 | 7 | 6 | 6
(United States) Amaya | 7 | 6 | 5 | 1 | 4
(United States) Manson | 3 | 0 | 3
2 | (United States) Connors | 6 | 6 | 6

Fourth round
11 | (United States) Gottfried | 2 | 6 | 4 | 5
2 | (United States) Connors | 6 | 1 | 6 | 7

| Preceded by 1978 Wimbledon Championships – Men's singles | Grand Slam men's singles | Succeeded by 1979 Australian Open – Men's singles |
