= New Orleans Grand Prix =

Defunct tennis tournament
- Event name: New Orleans Grand Prix; Hibernia Interfest Tennis Classic; New Orleans Tennis Festival; Gulf States Tennis Classic
- Tour: Grand Prix circuit
- Founded: 1978
- Abolished: 1980
- Editions: 3
- Location: New Orleans, Louisiana, U.S.
- Venue: Louisiana Superdome; New Orleans Municipal Auditorium
- Surface: Carpet / indoor

The New Orleans Grand Prix was a men's tennis tournament played in New Orleans, Louisiana in the United States from 1978 to 1980. The event was part of the Grand Prix tennis circuit. The 1979 edition was part of the World Championship Tennis series which was incorporated into the Grand Prix circuit from 1978 through 1981. The tournament was played on indoor carpet courts in the Louisiana Superdome in 1978 and in the New Orleans Municipal Auditorium in 1979 and 1980.

== Past finals ==
=== Singles ===
Year	Champions	Runners-up	Score
1978	(United States) Roscoe Tanner	(United States) Victor Amaya	6–3, 7–5
1979	(United States) John McEnroe	(United States) Roscoe Tanner	6–4, 6–2
1980	(Poland) Wojciech Fibak	(United States) Eliot Teltscher	6–4, 7–5

=== Doubles ===
Year	Champions	Runners-up	Score
1978	(United States) Erik van Dillen (United States) Dick Stockton	(Egypt) Ismail El Shafei (New Zealand) Brian Fairlie	7–6, 6–3
1979	(United States) Peter Fleming (United States) John McEnroe	(United States) Robert Lutz (United States) Stan Smith	6–1, 6–3
1980	(United States) Terry Moor (United States) Eliot Teltscher	(South Africa) Raymond Moore (South Africa) Robert Trogolo	7–6, 6–1

== See also ==
- Sports in New Orleans
