= Robert Trogolo =

South African tennis player (born 1953)

- Country (sports): South Africa
- Residence: Austin, Texas
- Born: 15 June 1953 (age 71); Johannesburg, South Africa
- Height: 1.80 m (5 ft 11 in)
- Plays: Right-handed

Singles
- Career record: 9–14
- Career titles: 0
- Highest ranking: No. 126 (26 December 1979)

Grand Slam singles results
- Wimbledon: 1R (1980)
- US Open: 3R (1979)

Doubles
- Career record: 10–17
- Career titles: 0

Grand Slam doubles results
- Wimbledon: 1R (1980)
- US Open: 1R (1979, 1980)

Robert Trogolo (born 15 June 1953) is a former professional tennis player from South Africa.

== Career ==
Trogolo was recruited to play tennis for the University of Mary Hardin–Baylor in 1972.

The South African reached the third round of the 1979 US Open, beating Rick Fisher and Jan Norbäck, before being eliminated by José Luis Clerc in four sets. That year he won three Challenger doubles titles within the space of a month, with Sashi Menon as his partner.

The pair competed together in both 1980 Wimbledon Championships and the 1980 US Open but were unable to progress past the first round in either. In both of those tournaments he also took part in the singles. He was defeated in the opening round of Wimbledon by Phil Dent but made the second round at the US Open, with a win over Fernando Maynetto. That year he was also a singles quarter-finalist in the San Juan Open and doubles finalist in New Orleans, partnering Raymond Moore.

== Grand Prix career finals ==
=== Doubles: 1 (0–1) ===
Result	W/L	Date	Tournament	Surface	Partner	Opponents	Score
Loss	0–1	Mar 1980	New Orleans, United States	Carpet	(United States) Raymond Moore	(United States) Terry Moor (United States) Eliot Teltscher	6–7, 1–6

== Challenger titles ==
=== Doubles: (3) ===
No.	Year	Tournament	Surface	Partner	Opponents	Score
1.	1979	Green Bay, United States	Hard	(India) Sashi Menon	(United States) Tom Leonard (United States) Jerry Van Linge	7–5, 6–4
2.	1979	Concord, United States	Hard	(India) Sashi Menon	(United States) Christopher Lewis (United States) Bruce Nichols	7–6^{(9–7)}, 6–4
3.	1979	San Diego, United States	Hard	(India) Sashi Menon	(Australia) Rod Frawley (New Zealand) Russell Simpson	7–6, 6–1
