= John Eagleton =

South African tennis player

- Country (sports): South Africa
- Plays: Right-handed

Singles
- Career record: 1–4
- Highest ranking: No. 272 (14 June 1976)

Doubles
- Career record: 4–13

Grand Slam doubles results
- US Open: 2R (1978)

John Eagleton is a South African former professional tennis player.

Eagleton, a South African junior champion, was a collegiate tennis player for the University of Miami, earning four All-American selections. In the late 1970s he competed professionally and made three doubles main draw appearance at the US Open, reaching the second round in 1978 partnering Deon Joubert. He was the personal coach of doubles specialist Ellis Ferreira and the two later set up a tennis academy together in Longboat Key, Florida.
