= George Amaya =

American tennis player

- Country (sports): United States
- Born: February 12, 1950 Weymouth, Massachusetts
- Died: September 25, 2005 (aged 55) Atlanta, Georgia
- Height: 5 ft 8 in (173 cm)
- Plays: Left-handed

Singles
- Career record: 7–13
- Highest ranking: No. 184 (Dec 26, 1979)

Grand Slam singles results
- US Open: 1R (1977, 1978, 1979)

Doubles
- Career record: 5–11

Grand Slam doubles results
- US Open: 1R (1978)

George Amaya (February 12, 1950 – September 25, 2005) was an American professional tennis player of Colombian descent. He died of cancer at his home in Atlanta in 2005.

Amaya spent most of his childhood in Colombia, but was born in Weymouth, Massachusetts and lived in the U.S. until the age of five. He had returned to the U.S. by the time he was college age and attended Presbyterian College in Clinton, South Carolina, where he was an NAIA singles and doubles champion.

A left-handed player, Amaya turned professional in 1975 and was ranked amongst the world's top 200, featuring in the main draw of three US Opens. He was a long serving director of tennis at the Cherokee Town and Country Club in Atlanta and is a member of the Georgia Tennis Hall of Fame.
