= Dave Siegler =

American tennis player (born 1961)

- Full name: David Jonathan Siegler
- Country (sports): United States
- Born: May 31, 1961 (age 64); Burbank, California
- Plays: Right-handed

Singles
- Career record: 15–25
- Career titles: 0
- Highest ranking: No. 137 (December 26, 1979)

Grand Slam singles results
- Australian Open: 2R (1979, 1981, 1982)
- US Open: 1R (1979)

Doubles
- Career record: 14–26
- Career titles: 0
- Highest ranking: No. 173 (January 3, 1983)

Grand Slam doubles results
- Australian Open: 2R (1980, 1982)

David Jonathan Siegler (born May 31, 1961) is a former professional tennis player from the United States.

== Biography ==
Siegler, who grew up in California, made the boys' juniors final at the 1979 Wimbledon Championships, which he lost to India's Ramesh Krishnan. He managed to qualify for the main draw of the 1979 US Open, but was unable to get past Keith Richardson in a first round match that went to five sets.

A valedictorian at Agoura High School, Siegler took up a full athletic scholarship to Stanford University in 1979 and the following year was a member of the Stanford team that won the NCAA Division One title.

During the early 1980s, Siegler competed on the Grand Prix tennis circuit, with his best performance coming in Cleveland in 1981 when finished runner-up, after beating Stan Smith en route to the final. He won two Challenger doubles titles, both with Robbie Venter.

In addition to his US Open appearance, Siegler made the main draw of three Australian Opens, in 1979, 1981 and 1982.

He now works as a child neurologist in Tulsa, Oklahoma.

== Grand Prix career finals ==
=== Singles: 1 (0–1) ===
| Result | W/L | Year | Tournament | Surface | Opponent | Score |
|---|---|---|---|---|---|---|
| Loss | 0–1 | 1981 | Cleveland, US | Hard | (United States) Gene Mayer | 1–6, 4–6 |

=== Doubles: 1 (0–1) ===
| Result | W/L | Year | Tournament | Surface | Partner | Opponents | Score |
|---|---|---|---|---|---|---|---|
| Loss | 0–1 | 1982 | Metz, France | Hard | (Republic of Ireland) Matt Doyle | (Australia) David Carter (Australia) Paul Kronk | 3–6, 6–7 |

== Challenger titles ==
=== Doubles: (2) ===
| No. | Year | Tournament | Surface | Partner | Opponents | Score |
|---|---|---|---|---|---|---|
| 1. | 1980 | Royan, France | Clay | (South Africa) Robbie Venter | (Sweden) Jan Gunnarsson (Sweden) Stefan Svensson | 6–4, 6–4 |
| 2. | 1980 | Le Touquet, France | Clay | (South Africa) Robbie Venter | (Sweden) Hans Simonsson (Sweden) Tenny Svensson | 7–6, 4–6, 6–3 |
