= Jerry Karzen =

American tennis player

- Full name: Jerry Morse-Karzen
- Country (sports): United States
- Height: 6 ft 4 in (193 cm)

Doubles
- Career record: 5–18

Grand Slam doubles results
- French Open: 1R (1977)
- Wimbledon: 1R (1977)
- US Open: 1R (1976, 1977, 1978)

Jerry Morse-Karzen (born 1950s) is an American former professional tennis player.

A native of Illinois, Karzen is a New Trier High School alumnus and during the early 1970s played collegiate tennis for the University of Michigan. He competed professionally after college, featuring in the doubles main draws of the French Open, Wimbledon and the US Open. His doubles partner on tour was often former Michigan teammate Eric Friedler.

Karzen, the father of four children, competes in USTA father-son/father-daughter championships with son Brett and daughter Becky, combining for 42 national titles (as of April 2016).

== ATP Challenger titles ==
=== Doubles: (1) ===
No.	Date	Tournament	Surface	Partner	Opponents	Score
1.	Sep 1979	Charlotte, United States	Clay	(United States) Mike Barr	(United States) John Benson (United States) Tony Giammalva	6–3, 4–6, 7–6
