= 1978 US Open (tennis) =

- Date: August 28 – September 10
- Edition: 98th
- Category: Grand Slam (ITF)
- Surface: Hardcourt
- Location: Flushing Meadows, New York City, United States
- Venue: National Tennis Center
- Attendance: 275,300

Champions

Men's singles
- (United States) Jimmy Connors

Women's singles
- (United States) Chris Evert

Men's doubles
- (United States) Bob Lutz / (United States) Stan Smith

Women's doubles
- (United States) Billie Jean King / (United States) Martina Navratilova

Mixed doubles
- (Netherlands) Betty Stöve / (South Africa) Frew McMillan
← 1977 ·	US Open	· 1979 →

The 1978 US Open was a tennis tournament played on outdoor hard courts at the USTA National Tennis Center in New York City in New York in the United States. It was the 98th edition of the US Open and the third Grand Slam tennis event of the year. The tournament was held from August 28 to September 10, 1978, and the singles titles were won by Jimmy Connors and Chris Evert. This was the first year the US Open was played at the National Tennis Center in Flushing Meadows after having been organized at the West Side Tennis Club venue in Forest Hills since 1915. It was also the first time the tournament was played on hard courts, as opposed to much of its history on grass and a brief stint, from 1975 through 1977, on clay.

== Seniors ==
=== Men's singles ===
(United States) Jimmy Connors (Note: Due to Connors' victories in '74 on grass and '76 on clay, he is the only person—man or woman—to ever win this tournament on three different surfaces.) defeated (Sweden) Björn Borg, 6–4, 6–2, 6–2

- It was Connors 5th career Grand Slam title, and his 3rd US Open title.

=== Women's singles ===
(United States) Chris Evert defeated (United States) Pam Shriver, 7–5, 6–4

- It was Evert's 8th career Grand Slam title, and her 4th (consecutive) US Open title.

=== Men's doubles ===
(United States) Bob Lutz / (United States) Stan Smith defeated (United States) Marty Riessen / (United States) Sherwood Stewart, 1–6, 7–5, 6–3

=== Women's doubles ===
(United States) Billie Jean King / (United States) Martina Navratilova defeated (Australia) Kerry Melville Reid / (Australia) Wendy Turnbull, 7–6, 6–4

=== Mixed doubles ===
(Netherlands) Betty Stöve / (South Africa) Frew McMillan defeated (United States) Billie Jean King / (Australia) Ray Ruffels, 6–3, 7-6

== Juniors ==
=== Boys' singles ===
(Sweden) Per Hjertquist defeated (Sweden) Stefan Simonsson, 7-6, 1-6, 7-6

=== Girls' singles ===
(United States) Linda Siegel defeated (Argentina) Ivanna Madruga, 6–4, 6-4

== Notes ==
Preceded by 1978 Wimbledon Championships	Grand Slams	Succeeded by 1978 Australian Open
