= Guadalajara Open =

Defunct tennis tournament
- Tour: Grand Prix
- Founded: 1978
- Abolished: 1981
- Editions: 3
- Location: Guadalajara, Mexico
- Surface: Clay / outdoor

The Guadalajara Open is a defunct men's tennis tournament that was played on the Grand Prix tennis circuit founded in 1978. The event was held in Guadalajara, Mexico and was played on outdoor clay courts. Unseeded Gene Mayer won the first singles title while Sandy Mayer and Sherwood Stewart partnered to win the doubles title. The tournament then became part of the ATP Challenger Series in 1979, and played one final time in 1981.

Guadalajara currently is host to the Guadalajara Open, a WTA Tour event.

== Past finals ==
=== Singles ===
Year	Champions	Runners-up	Score
1978	(United States) Gene Mayer	(Australia) John Newcombe	6–3, 6–4
1979	(Australia) Paul McNamee	(United States) Rick Fagel	6–4, 6–4
1981	(Brazil) João Soares	(United States) Matt Anger	6–4, 7–5

=== Doubles ===
Year	Champions	Runners-up	Score
1978	(United States) Sandy Mayer (United States) Sherwood Stewart	(United States) Gene Mayer (India) Sashi Menon	4–6, 7–6, 6–3
