= Eric Friedler =

American tennis player

- Full name: Eric Friedler
- Country (sports): United States
- Born: September 8, 1954 (age 70); Evanston, Illinois, US
- Plays: Right-handed

Singles
- Career record: 16–37
- Career titles: 0
- Highest ranking: No. 152 (January 16, 1978)

Grand Slam singles results
- Australian Open: 1R (1977)
- US Open: 1R (1974, 1976, 1978)

Doubles
- Career record: 11–31
- Career titles: 0

Grand Slam doubles results
- French Open: 1R (1977, 1980)
- Wimbledon: 1R (1977)
- US Open: 1R (1976, 1977, 1978)

Eric Friedler (born September 8, 1954) is a former professional tennis player from the United States.

== Biography ==
Friedler grew up in Chicago and attended Evanston Township High School. From 1972 to 1976 he was at the University of Michigan, where he played on the varsity tennis team. He was an All-American collegiate player in 1975 and a two-time Big Ten Doubles Champion.

Following graduation he competed professionally on tour, until 1980. During his career he competed in all four Grand Slam tournaments, in either singles or doubles. Most of his doubles appearances were with Jerry Karzen, including his only main draw entry at Wimbledon in 1977. He was runner-up in the doubles at a Grand Prix tournament in Lafayette in 1979, with Victor Amaya. In singles his best result was a semi-final in Atlanta in 1979, when managed wins over Ferdi Taygan, Rick Meyer and David Schneider. In 1980 he had an upset win in Cincinnati over Peter Fleming, who was the defending champion.

After leaving professional tennis he completed a J.D. degree at the University of Chicago Law School.

At the age of 38, he was a member of the American team which competed in the 1993 Maccabiah Games in Israel.

He now runs a construction company in Chicago.

== Grand Prix career finals ==
=== Doubles: 1 (0–1) ===
Result	No.	Date	Tournament	Surface	Partner	Opponents	Score
Loss	1.	1979	Lafayette, U.S.	Carpet	(United States) Victor Amaya	(United States) Marty Riessen (United States) Sherwood Stewart	4–6, 4–6

== Challenger titles ==
=== Doubles: (2) ===
No.	Year	Tournament	Surface	Partner	Opponents	Score
1.	1978	Tel Aviv, Israel	Hard	(Austria) Peter Feigl	(United States) Mike Fishbach (Netherlands) Tom Okker	6–3, 6–7, 6–3
2.	1979	Montgomery, U.S.	Hard	(United States) Erik van Dillen	(United States) Tom Leonard (United States) Jerry Van Linge	4–6, 6–3, 7–6
