= Horace Reid (tennis) =

American tennis player

- Country (sports): United States
- Born: June 14, 1955 (age 71)
- Height: 6 ft (183 cm)
- Plays: Right-handed

Singles
- Career record: 0–1
- Highest ranking: No. 272 (January 3, 1979)

Doubles
- Career record: 1–2
- Highest ranking: No. 227 (January 3, 1979)

Grand Slam doubles results
- US Open: 2R (1979)

Grand Slam mixed doubles results
- US Open: 2R (1978)

Horace Reid (born June 14, 1955) is an American former professional tennis player.

Raised in Atlanta, Georgia, Reid won two State AAA singles championships while a Washington High School student. He ranked 10th in the U.S. for the 14s age division and was the first African American to win a Georgia state junior title.

Reid won the American Tennis Association singles championship in 1972 and was considered a protege of former world number one Arthur Ashe, who provided him with financial support. Attending UCLA on a scholarship, he played No.4 singles and No.1 doubles for the Bruins, before dropping out his second year.

Following his time at the Bruins, Reid began competing on the professional tour and achieved a best singles world ranking of 272. He featured in doubles main draws at the US Open.

== ATP Challenger finals ==
=== Doubles: 1 (0–1) ===
Result	No.	Date	Tournament	Surface	Partner	Opponents	Score
Loss	1.	Sep 1978	Lincoln, U.S.	Hard	(United States) Rick Meyer	(United States) Keith Richardson (United States) John Sadri	6–4, 3–6, 5–7
