= Randy Crawford (tennis) =

American tennis player

- Country (sports): United States
- Born: December 22, 1955 (age 70) Dallas, Texas, U.S.
- Height: 6 ft 2 in (188 cm)
- Plays: Right-handed

Singles
- Career record: 7–15
- Highest ranking: No. 95 (1979.06.25)

Grand Slam singles results
- French Open: 1R (1979)
- Wimbledon: 1R (1979)
- US Open: 1R (1979)

Doubles
- Career record: 3–9

Grand Slam doubles results
- French Open: 1R (1979)
- Wimbledon: 1R (1979)
- US Open: 1R (1979)

Randy Crawford (born December 22, 1955) is an American former professional tennis player.

Born in Dallas, Crawford played collegiate tennis for Texas Christian University, where he was the 1977 SWC singles champion and an All-American. After college he competed on the professional tour and had a best ranking of 95 in the world, featuring in grand slam events in 1979. He made Grand Prix quarter-finals at Sarasota in 1979 and Tulsa in 1980.

Crawford was a hitting partner/coach of Martina Navratilova in the late 1980s and has also coached Gigi Fernández.

Since the 1990s he has resided in Aspen, Colorado and is married with a son and daughter.
