= Keith Richardson (tennis) =

American tennis player

- Full name: Keith Richardson
- Country (sports): United States
- Born: 1953 (age 72–73) Rock Hill, South Carolina
- Turned pro: 1976
- Retired: 1979
- Plays: Right-handed

Singles
- Career record: 18–43
- Career titles: 0
- Highest ranking: No. 74 (December 31, 1977)

Grand Slam singles results
- US Open: 3R (1979)

Doubles
- Career record: 19–44
- Career titles: 0

Grand Slam doubles results
- US Open: 1R (1979)

Keith Richardson (born 1953) is a former professional tennis player from the United States. He is a member of both the North Carolina and South Carolina Tennis Hall of Fame.

== Biography ==
Richardson grew up in Rock Hill, South Carolina and attended Rock Hill High School, where he was the state's 4A High School Tennis Champion in 1971. He got an athletic scholarship to North Carolina's Appalachian State University where he played varsity tennis from 1971 to 1975, while he studied for a BSBA degree. During this time he was a three time Southern Conference Singles Champion (1973, 1974, 1975) and two time Doubles Champion (1974, 1975).

In 1976, Richardson turned professional and began touring internationally. By the end of the 1977 he had reached his highest ranking of 74 in the world. He twice featured in the US Open, in 1977 and 1979. In his first appearance in 1977 he lost in the opening round to Phil Dent, but in 1979 he was able to make the third round. He began the 1979 US Open with a five-set win over Dave Siegler, then defeated a young Kevin Curren in straight sets, before exiting in the third round with a loss to Dick Stockton. In 1979 he also played in the first round of the men's doubles, with John Yuill. On the Grand Prix circuit his best performance came in 1979, a doubles final in Sarasota, which he and John James lost to Steve Krulevitz and Ilie Năstase. He also made his only singles quarter-final that year, at Madrid.

Richardson retired from the tour at the end of the 1979 season and then spent three years as the Head Tennis Professional at Benvenue Country Club.

Since 1983 he has worked in the insurance industry and is currently at Peoples First Insurance in Rock Hill, South Carolina. He is married with two children.

== Grand Prix career finals ==
=== Doubles: 1 (0–1) ===
Result	W/L	Date	Tournament	Surface	Partner	Opponents	Score
Loss	0–1	Feb 1979	Sarasota, US	Carpet	(Australia) John James	(United States) Steve Krulevitz (Romania) Ilie Năstase	6–7, 3–6

== Challenger titles ==
=== Doubles: (2) ===
No.	Year	Tournament	Surface	Partner	Opponents	Score
1.	1978	Tinton Falls, US	Hard	(United States) John Sadri	(United States) Scott Carnahan (United States) Charles Strode	6–7, 6–3, 6–4
2.	1978	Lincoln, US	Hard	(United States) John Sadri	(United States) Rick Meyer (United States) Horace Reid	4–6, 6–3, 7–5
