= Jerry Van Linge =

American tennis player

- Country (sports): United States

Singles
- Career record: 1–3
- Highest ranking: No. 271 (Dec 26, 1979)

Doubles
- Career record: 9–17

Grand Slam doubles results
- US Open: 2R (1980)

Grand Slam mixed doubles results
- US Open: 2R (1978)

Jerry Van Linge is an American former professional tennis player.

Van Linge, a native of Los Angeles, competed on the professional tour in the 1970s. He made the second round of the 1972 Golden Gate Pacific Coast Classic (Albany, California) and featured in doubles main draws at the US Open.

== ATP Challenger finals ==
=== Doubles: 3 (1–2) ===
Result	No.	Date	Tournament	Surface	Partner	Opponents	Score
Win	1.	Oct 1978	Pasadena, United States	Hard	(United States) Tom Leonard	(United States) Warren Eber (United States) Glen Holroyd	6–3, 7–6
Loss	1.	Jun 1979	Montgomery, United States	Hard	(United States) Tom Leonard	(United States) Eric Friedler (United States) Erik Van Dillen	6–4, 3–6, 6–7
Loss	2.	Jun 1979	Green Bay, United States	Hard	(United States) Tom Leonard	(India) Sashi Menon (South Africa) Robert Trogolo	5–7, 4–6
