= David Schneider (tennis) =

South African tennis player (born 1955)

- Native name: דוד שניידר
- Country (sports): South Africa; Israel
- Residence: Boca Raton, Florida
- Born: 17 May 1955 (age 71) Johannesburg, South Africa
- Height: 1.85 m (6 ft 1 in)
- Plays: Right-handed

Singles
- Career record: 29–85
- Career titles: 0
- Highest ranking: No. 62 (31 December 1978)

Grand Slam singles results
- Australian Open: 1R (1979)
- French Open: 1R (1977, 1981)
- Wimbledon: 2R (1978, 1979)
- US Open: 1R (1975–1980)

Doubles
- Career record: 34–86
- Career titles: 0

Grand Slam doubles results
- Australian Open: 2R (1979)
- French Open: 1R (1977, 1981)
- Wimbledon: 2R (1979)
- US Open: 3R (1979)
Medal record
Maccabiah Games
Gold medal – first place	1973 Israel	Men's Singles
Gold medal – first place	1973 Israel	Men's Doubles
Gold medal – first place	1973 Israel	Mixed Doubles

David Schneider (Hebrew: דוד שניידר; born 17 May 1955) is a former professional South-African-Israeli tennis player, originally from South Africa. Schneider won three gold medals at the 1973 Maccabiah Games, in the men's singles, men's doubles, and mixed doubles. He has played in the US Open, French Open, Australian Open, and Wimbledon, and for the Israel Davis Cup team.

== Career ==
Schneider, who is Jewish, won three gold medals at the 1973 Maccabiah Games, in the men's singles, doubles with Errol Kilov, and mixed doubles with Ilana Kloss.

A serve and volley specialist, Schneider had his breakthrough performance at the South African Open in 1978. He reached the semi-finals, with wins over Jose Luis Clerc, John Feaver, Deon Joubert and Peter Fleming, He also reached the quarter finals in Gstaad beating Bob Hewitt which ensured he finished the season ranked in the top 100, reaching a career high 58 for the first time. Earlier in the year, he won his first Grand Slam singles match, on his sixth attempt, beating Australian Dick Crealy at Wimbledon. he also held match point against john McEnroe in the 2nd round in San Francisco after defeating top tenner Tom Gorman in the first round

In 1979 he had his best year on tour, making a quarter-finals in Atlanta, Johannesburg, and Toronto where he beat top tenner Vijay Amritraj and Tel Aviv. The South African again made the second round in the Wimbledon Championships, with a victory over Bob Carmichael. He lost five set opening round matches to strong opponents at the 1979 US Open and 1979 Australian Open, to Jan Kodeš and Geoff Masters respectively. In the US Open after losing to Guillermo Vilas he and partner Charlie Pasarell made it to the third round of the men's doubles.

Schneider holds an Israeli passport and began playing for the Israel Davis Cup team in 1981. Over three years, he took part in six ties and played nine matches, of which he won four, a singles rubber over Slobodan Živojinović and three doubles matches, partnering Shlomo Glickstein. He also had success with Glickstein on the 1981 Grand Prix season, with the pair finishing runner-up in Johannesburg and at the South Orange Open. While living in Israel, Schneider served in the Israeli military (he had also previously served in the South African military).

He eventually settled in the United States, where he married an American, the former Jill Strelitz with whom he has three children, Jonathan, Daniella and Michael, and three grandchildren. He started a diamond wholesale business in Boca Raton, Florida, which he has run with his son for over 30years

== Grand Prix career finals ==
=== Doubles: 2 (0–2) ===
Result	W-L	Date	Tournament	Surface	Partner	Opponents	Score
Loss	0–1	Apr 1981	Johannesburg, South Africa	Hard	(Israel) Shlomo Glickstein	(South Africa) Bernard Mitton (South Africa) Raymond Moore	5–7, 6–3, 1–6
Loss	0–2	Aug 1981	South Orange, United States	Clay	(Israel) Shlomo Glickstein	(United States) Fritz Buehning (United States) Andrew Pattison	1–6, 4–6

== See also ==
- List of select Jewish tennis players
