= Deon Joubert =

South African tennis player (born 1953)

- Full name: Deon Joubert
- Country (sports): South Africa
- Born: June 1953 (age 72) Orange Free State, South Africa
- Plays: Left-handed

Singles
- Career record: 38–73
- Career titles: 0
- Highest ranking: No. 56 (31 December 1978)

Grand Slam singles results
- French Open: 1R (1979)
- Wimbledon: 3R (1973)
- US Open: 1R (1977, 1978)

Doubles
- Career record: 34–71
- Career titles: 0

Grand Slam doubles results
- French Open: 1R (1977, 1979)
- Wimbledon: 2R (1973)
- US Open: 2R (1978)

Deon Joubert (born June 1953 (Note: ATP have his birthdate recorded as 10 June 1953. ITF have 19 June 1953 as his birthdate.)) is a former professional tennis player from South Africa.

== Biography ==
Joubert represented South Africa in the 1973 Davis Cup, for a tie against Argentina which was held in Montevideo, Uruguay. He teamed up with Bernard Mitton in the doubles to beat Ricardo Cano and Guillermo Vilas in five sets. That win kept South Africa in the tie and Joubert was called up to play Vilas in the fourth rubber, but was comfortably beaten by the Argentine.

A left-handed player, Joubert competed in the 1973 Wimbledon Championships as a lucky loser and managed to make it to the third round, with wins over Colin Dowdeswell and Jaime Pinto-Bravo. In the third round he lost to Davis Cup teammate Bernard Mitton, also a lucky loser, in a five set match.

In 1978 he won two American ATP Challenger tournaments, the first in Birmingham and the other in Virginia Beach.

On the Grand Prix tennis circuit he had his best performance in 1979 when he was runner-up in a tournament in Johannesburg in 1979. He lost the final to Argentina's José Luis Clerc. The following year he made the semi-finals of the Sarasota Open in Florida.

== Grand Prix career finals ==
=== Singles: 1 (0–1) ===
Result	W/L	Date	Tournament	Surface	Opponent	Score
Loss	0–1	Apr 1979	Johannesburg, South Africa	Hard	(Argentina) José Luis Clerc	2–6, 1–6

== Challenger titles ==
=== Singles: (2) ===
No.	Year	Tournament	Surface	Opponent	Score
1.	1978	Birmingham, U. S.	Grass	(Mexico) Marcello Lara	6–4, 6–2
2.	1978	Virginia Beach, U. S.	Hard	(United States) Mike Cahill	7–5, 6–1

== See also ==
- List of South Africa Davis Cup team representatives
