= 1979 US Open (tennis) =

- Date: August 28 – September 9
- Edition: 99th
- Category: Grand Slam (ITF)
- Surface: Hardcourt
- Location: Flushing Meadows, New York City, United States
- Venue: National Tennis Center

Champions

Men's singles
- (United States) John McEnroe

Women's singles
- (United States) Tracy Austin

Men's doubles
- (United States) Peter Fleming / (United States) John McEnroe

Women's doubles
- (Netherlands) Betty Stöve / (Australia) Wendy Turnbull

Mixed doubles
- (South Africa) Greer Stevens / (South Africa) Bob Hewitt
- US Open

The 1979 US Open was a tennis tournament played on outdoor hard courts at the USTA National Tennis Center in New York City in the United States. It was the 99th edition of the US Open and the third Grand Slam tennis event of the year. The tournament was held from August 28 to September 9, 1979. John McEnroe and Tracy Austin won the singles titles.

Chris Evert's victory over Billie Jean King in the semifinals of the women's singles tournament was the first sporting event result ever reported on ESPN.

== Seniors ==
=== Men's singles ===
(United States) John McEnroe defeated (United States) Vitas Gerulaitis 7–5, 6–3, 6–3

- It was McEnroe's 1st career Grand Slam title.

=== Women's singles ===
(United States) Tracy Austin defeated (United States) Chris Evert 6–4, 6–3

- It was Austin's 1st career Grand Slam title. Austin also became the youngest-ever US Open champion, aged 16 years and 9 months.

=== Men's doubles ===
(United States) John McEnroe / (United States) Peter Fleming defeated (United States) Bob Lutz / (United States) Stan Smith 6–2, 6–4

=== Women's doubles ===
(Netherlands) Betty Stöve / (Australia) Wendy Turnbull defeated (United States) Billie Jean King (United States) Martina Navratilova 7–5, 6–3

=== Mixed doubles ===
(South Africa) Greer Stevens / (South Africa) Bob Hewitt defeated (Netherlands) Betty Stöve / (South Africa) Frew McMillan 6–3, 7–5

== Juniors ==
=== Boys' singles ===
(United States) Scott Davis defeated (Sweden) Jan Gunnarson 6–3, 6–1

=== Girls' singles ===
(United States) Alycia Moulton defeated (United States) Mary Lou Piatek 7–6, 7–6

Preceded by 1979 Wimbledon Championships	Grand Slams	Succeeded by 1979 Australian Open
