= Gene Malin (tennis) =

American tennis player

- Full name: Stuart Eugene Malin
- Country (sports): United States
- Born: October 1, 1948 (age 77)
- Plays: Right-handed

Singles
- Career record: 10–30
- Highest ranking: No. 116 (Sep 17, 1979)

Grand Slam singles results
- Australian Open: 2R (1979)
- French Open: Q1 (1972)
- Wimbledon: Q3 (1980)
- US Open: 2R (1979)

Doubles
- Career record: 13–35
- Highest ranking: No. 148 (Apr 28, 1980)

Grand Slam doubles results
- Australian Open: 1R (1979)
- Wimbledon: 1R (1980)
- US Open: 2R (1980)

Stuart Eugene Malin (born October 1, 1948), known as Gene Malin, is an American former professional tennis player.

A native of Los Angeles, Malin possessed one of the fastest serves on tour and had a singles ranking as high as 116 in the world. His best performance on the Grand Prix circuit came at Cleveland in 1979, registering wins over Ramesh Krishnan and Adriano Panatta, before he lost a close semi-final to Ilie Năstase. During his time on tour he also defeated former world number one John Newcombe.

Malin was a coach of the India Davis Cup team which reached the final in 1987 and has been the tour coach of several players including Stephanie Rehe, Bonnie Gadusek and Barbara Potter.
