= Tom Leonard (tennis) =

American tennis player

- Country (sports): United States
- Born: July 15, 1948 (age 78) Des Moines, Iowa, U.S.
- Height: 5 ft 9 in (1.75 m)
- Plays: Right-handed

Singles
- Career record: 49–109
- Career titles: 0
- Highest ranking: No. 34 (April 10, 1978)

Grand Slam singles results
- Wimbledon: 4R (1978)
- US Open: 3R (1971)

Doubles
- Career record: 72–105
- Career titles: 1
- Highest ranking: No. 67 (January 3, 1979)

Tom Leonard (born July 15, 1948) is a former professional tennis player from the United States. (His mother Joanne Dunn played at Forrest Hills in 1943)

Leonard enjoyed most of his tennis success while playing as a Junior. Finalist - National Hardcourts Burlingame, Ca 1966 (Singles) Finalist - National Clay Courts Louisville, Kentucky 1966 (Singles) Finalist - US Nationals (Jr.) Kalamazoo, Michigan 1966 (Singles) Finalist - US National (Jr.) Kalamazoo, Michigan 1966 (Doubles) Winner - National Jaycees (Jr.) Tampa, Fl (Singles) Played on the National Junior Davis Cup Team 1966, 1967, 1968,& 1969. Started playing professionally with World Championship Tennis (Started by Lamar Hunt) from 1971 (as a substitute for Roy Emerson) until 1974. Hated traveling - so retired in 1974.

Started playing again professionally in 1977 on the minor circuits to get ranking high enough to play on the major circuit again. Played Wimbledon in 1978 - lost in the round of 16 to Tom Okker. Retired again in 1979 due to major ankle injury.

== Grand Prix finals ==
=== Doubles (1 win, 3 losses) ===
Result	W/L	Date	Tournament	Surface	Partner	Opponent	Score
Win	1–0	Aug 1971	South Orange, U.S.	Hard	(Australia) Bob Carmichael	(United States) Clark Graebner (United States) Erik van Dillen	6–4, 4–6, 6–4
Loss	1–1	Mar 1974	Barcelona WCT, Spain	Carpet	(United States) Tom Edlefsen	(United States) Arthur Ashe (United States) Roscoe Tanner	3–6, 4–6
Loss	1–2	Sep 1977	Los Angeles, U.S.	Hard	(United States) Mike Machette	(United States) Sandy Mayer (South Africa) Frew McMillan	2–6, 3–6
Loss	1–3	Apr 1978	Houston WCT, U.S.	Clay	(United States) Mike Machette	(Poland) Wojciech Fibak (Netherlands) Tom Okker	5–7, 5–7

== ATP Challenger finals ==
=== Doubles (1 win, 2 losses) ===
Result	No.	Date	Tournament	Surface	Partner	Opponents	Score
Win	1.	Oct 1978	Pasadena, U.S.	Hard	(United States) Jerry Van Linge	(United States) Warren Eber (United States) Glen Holroyd	6–3, 7–6
Loss	1.	Jun 1979	Montgomery, U.S.	Hard	(United States) Jerry Van Linge	(United States) Eric Friedler (United States) Erik Van Dillen	6–4, 3–6, 6–7
Loss	2.	Jun 1979	Green Bay, U.S.	Hard	(United States) Jerry Van Linge	(India) Sashi Menon (South Africa) Robert Trogolo	5–7, 4–6
