= Sashi Menon =

Indian tennis player

- Country (sports): India
- Born: 9 August 1952 (age 73); Madras, India
- Height: 5 ft 11 in (180 cm)
- Turned pro: 1970
- Retired: 1984
- Plays: Right-handed

Singles
- Career record: 234–270
- Career titles: 4
- Highest ranking: No. 71 (21 October 1975)

Grand Slam singles results
- Australian Open: 2R (1975, 1982)
- French Open: 2R (1976)
- Wimbledon: 2R (1976, 1980, 1982)
- US Open: 2R (1975, 1976, 1977)

Doubles
- Career record: 124–170
- Career titles: 3
- Highest ranking: No. 81 (12 December 1976)

Grand Slam doubles results
- Australian Open: QF (1975)
- French Open: 2R (1977)
- Wimbledon: 3R (1976)
- US Open: 2R (1977)

Sashi Menon (born 9 August 1952) is an Indian former professional tennis player. He was active from 1970 to 1984 and played over 700 matches and won 4 career singles titles, in addition he also won 3 doubles titles.

== Career ==
He played his first singles tournament in 1970 at the qualifiers for the Pacific Southwest Championships. In 1971 he entered his first major tournament at the US Open where he lost in the first round to Željko Franulović. In 1972 he was a quarter finalist at the Pennsylvania Lawn Tennis Championships where he lost to Mark Cox.

In 1973 he reached his first senior tournament final at the Kona Kai Open in San Diego where he was beaten by John Andrews, the same year he won his first title at the Charles Farrell Invitation played at the Racquet Club of Palm Springs against Larry Nagler, and was a losing finalist at the Blue and Gray Championships in Montgomery, Alabama to Raz Reid,

In 1976 he reached the final of the Bangalore Open but lost to Kim Warwick. In 1978 he reached the finals of the Tinton Falls Open in Trinton Falls, New Jersey and won the title against John Sadri. His final singles title came in 1979 at the South Fulton Tennis Classic at College Park, Georgia that was part of the American Express Satellite Circuit that year. He played his final singles event at the International Championships of Egypt in Cairo in 1984.

== Career finals ==
=== Singles: 7 (4 titles, 3 runners-up) ===
Result	W/L	Date	Tournament	Surface	Opponent	Score
Loss	1.	1973	Kona Kai Open	Hard	(United States) John Andrews	1–6, 5–7
Win	1.	1973	Charles Farrell Invitation	Clay	(United States) Larry Nagler	7–6, 7–5
Loss	2.	1973	Blue Gray Championships	Clay	(United States) Raz Reid	3–6, 6–7
Win	2.	1974	Washington Classic	Hard	(United States) Terry Moor	6–3, 6–2
Loss	3.	1976	Bangalore Open	Clay	(Australia) Kim Warwick	1–6, 5–7
Win	3.	1978	Tinton Falls Open	Hard	(United States) John Sadri	3–6, 7–5, 6–3
Win	4.	1979	South Fulton Tennis Classic	Hard	(United States) Terry Moor	6–3, 6–2

=== Doubles: 4 (3 titles, 1 runners-up) ===
Result	W/L	Date	Tournament	Surface	Partner	Opponents	Score
Win	1.	1978	Mexico City WCT, Mexico	Hard	(United States) Gene Mayer	(Mexico) Marcello Lara (Mexico) Raúl Ramírez	6–3, 7–6
Win	2.	1978	Lagos, Nigeria	Clay	(United States) George Hardie	(Rhodesia) Colin Dowdeswell (West Germany) Jürgen Fassbender	6–3, 3–6, 7–5
Loss	1.	1978	Guadalajara, Mexico	Clay	(United States) Gene Mayer	(United States) Sandy Mayer (United States) Sherwood Stewart	6–4, 6–7, 3–6
Win	3.	1978	Calcutta, India	Clay	(United States) Sherwood Stewart	(France) Gilles Moretton (France) Yannick Noah	7–6, 6–4
