= 1977 Wimbledon Championships – Men's singles qualifying =

Men's singles qualifying
- 1977 Wimbledon Championships

Events
Singles	men	women		boys	girls
Doubles	men	women	mixed	boys	girls
WC Singles	men	women	quad
WC Doubles	men	women	quad
Legends	men	women	seniors

Qualification
Singles	men	women
Doubles	men	women
- Wimbledon Championships

Players who neither had high enough rankings nor received wild cards to enter the main draw of the annual Wimbledon Tennis Championships participated in a qualifying tournament held one week before the event. Several players withdrew from the main draw after qualifying had commenced, leading to the highest ranked players who lost in the final qualifying round to be entered into the main draw as lucky losers.

== Qualifiers ==
1. (Czechoslovakia) Tomáš Šmíd
2. (United States) Jim McManus
3. (United States) Raz Reid
4. (New Zealand) Russell Simpson
5. (United States) Henry Bunis
6. (Australia) Chris Kachel
7. (Ecuador) Ricardo Ycaza
8. (Netherlands) Rolf Thung
9. (Republic of Ireland) Sean Sorensen
10. (Czechoslovakia) Jiří Granát
11. (Australia) Alvin Gardiner
12. (Australia) John Marks
13. (United States) Eliot Teltscher
14. (United States) John Holladay
15. (Sweden) Douglas Palm
16. (United States) John McEnroe

== Lucky losers ==
1. (United States) Butch Seewagen
2. (United States) Scott Carnahan
3. (United States) William Lofgren
4. (Brazil) Jose-Edison Mandarino
5. (Australia) Bob Carmichael
6. (South Africa) Rory Chappell
7. (Mexico) Emilio Montaño
8. (United States) Rick Fisher

== Qualifying draw ==
Key

- Q = Qualifier
- WC = Wild card
- LL = Lucky loser
- Alt = Alternate
- ITF = ITF entry
- PR = Protected ranking
- SR = Special ranking
- SE = Special exempt
- JE = Junior exempt
- JR = Junior Accelerator Programme entrant
- CO = College Accelerator Programme entrant
- NG = Next Gen Accelerator Program entrant
- w/o = Walkover
- r = Retired
- d = Defaulted

=== First qualifier ===
First round
1	(Czechoslovakia) Tomáš Šmíd	8	6
8	(United Kingdom) Michael Appleton	6	3
4	(United Kingdom) Martin West	6	9
5	(United Kingdom) William Gowans	2	7
2	(France) Dominique Bedel	2	6	7
7	(Venezuela) Humphrey Hose	6	4	5
3	(United States) Scott Carnahan	6	6
6	(United States) Jerry Karzen	2	2

Second round
(Czechoslovakia) Tomáš Šmíd	6	8
(United Kingdom) Martin West	3	6
(France) Dominique Bedel	2	8
(United States) Scott Carnahan	6	9

Qualifying competition
(Czechoslovakia) Tomáš Šmíd	6	8	8	6
(United States) Scott Carnahan	4	6	9	2

=== Second qualifier ===
First round
1	(Mexico) Emilio Montaño	6	7
8	(United States) Norman Holmes	3	5
4	(Pakistan) Meer Mohammed Khan	6	6
5	(New Zealand) John Mills	4	3
2	(France) Pascal Portes	7	6	8
7	(Brazil) José Schmidt	9	2	6
3	(United States) Jim McManus	6	6
6	(Argentina) Gustavo Guerrero	1	2

Second round
(Mexico) Emilio Montaño	5	9	6
(Pakistan) Meer Mohammed Khan	7	7	3
(France) Pascal Portes	3	7
(United States) Jim McManus	6	9

Qualifying competition
(Mexico) Emilio Montaño	1	6	3	3
(United States) Jim McManus	6	3	6	6

=== Third qualifier ===
First round
1	(United States) Raz Reid	6	4	6
8	(India) Chiradip Mukerjea	3	6	2
4	(United Kingdom) Jeremy Dier	6	6
5	(New Zealand) Peter Langsford	2	4
2	(France) Yannick Noah	6	8
7	(Brazil) Enio Moreira	1	6
3	(Australia) Tim Clements	6	4	6
6	(Australia) Charlie Fancutt	4	6	3

Second round
(United States) Raz Reid	7	8	6
(United Kingdom) Jeremy Dier	9	6	2
(France) Yannick Noah	6	6
(Australia) Tim Clements	4	3

Qualifying competition
(United States) Raz Reid	7	6	6
(France) Yannick Noah	5	2	2

=== Fourth qualifier ===
First round
1	(New Zealand) Russell Simpson	6	6
8	(Switzerland) Michel Burgener	3	2
4	(Switzerland) Matthias Huerlimann	6	6
5	(Australia) Wayne Hampson	1	2
2	(United Kingdom) Mike Collins	6	1
7	(Greece) Nicolas Kelaidis	4	0^{r}
3	(Brazil) Jose-Edison Mandarino	6	8	6
6	(United States) Richard Meyer	3	9	4

Second round
(New Zealand) Russell Simpson	6	6
(Switzerland) Matthias Huerlimann	2	4
(United Kingdom) Mike Collins	8	7	2
(Brazil) Jose-Edison Mandarino	6	9	6

Qualifying competition
(New Zealand) Russell Simpson	8	7	9	6
(Brazil) Jose-Edison Mandarino	9	5	7	1

=== Fifth qualifier ===
First round
1	(United States) Henry Bunis	6	6
8	(Czechoslovakia) Stanislav Birner	4	4
4	(Australia) Bob Rheinberger	9	6
5	(Australia) Dale Collings	8	2
2	(Argentina) Alejandro Gattiker	7	6	6
7	(Australia) Stephen Wright	5	8	4
3	(Australia) Victor Eke	6	6
6	(India) Ashok Amritraj	3	3

Second round
(United States) Henry Bunis	6	6
(Australia) Bob Rheinberger	2	4
(Argentina) Alejandro Gattiker	4	4
(Australia) Victor Eke	6	6

Qualifying competition
(United States) Henry Bunis	6	6	6
(Australia) Victor Eke	4	2	2

=== Sixth qualifier ===
First round
1	(Australia) Chris Kachel	6	6
8	(Israel) Shlomo Glickstein	2	2
4	(United Kingdom) Neil Rayner	9	4	6
5	(Pakistan) Saeed Meer	8	6	4
2	(United States) Jeremy Cohen	9	1	6
7	(United States) P Ranney	8	6	4
3	(Switzerland) Heinz Günthardt	9	8
6	(United Kingdom) Willie Davies	8	6

Second round
(Australia) Chris Kachel	6	6
(United Kingdom) Neil Rayner	2	4
(United States) Jeremy Cohen	3	4
(Switzerland) Heinz Günthardt	6	6

Qualifying competition
(Australia) Chris Kachel	3	6	6	6
(Switzerland) Heinz Günthardt	6	3	2	3

=== Seventh qualifier ===
First round
1	(Ecuador) Ricardo Ycaza	6	5	6
8	(United States) Doug Crawford	3	7	2
4	(Australia) Robert Keighery	6	6
5	(India) Bhanu Nunna	4	3
2	(Canada) Greg Halder	6	6
7	(United States) Henry Jacobson	3	1
3	(United States) Butch Seewagen	6	6
6	(United States) Brian McCarthy	1	4

Second round
(Ecuador) Ricardo Ycaza	6	6
(Australia) Robert Keighery	3	2
(Canada) Greg Halder	3	6
(United States) Butch Seewagen	6	8

Qualifying competition
(Ecuador) Ricardo Ycaza	4	6	6	9
(United States) Butch Seewagen	6	4	2	7

=== Eighth qualifier ===
First round
1	(Australia) David Carter	6	6
8	(Chile) Álvaro Fillol	4	4
4	(United Kingdom) Christopher Kaskow	6	6
5	(United Kingdom) Nigel Sears	3	4
2	(United States) Robert Van't Hof	8	7	17
7	(Australia) Paul Dougherty	9	5	15
3	(Netherlands) Rolf Thung	6	6
6	(Australia) Mark Pinchbeck	3	1

Second round
(Australia) David Carter	7	6
(United Kingdom) Christopher Kaskow	5	2
(United States) Robert Van't Hof	3	1
(Netherlands) Rolf Thung	6	6

Qualifying competition
(Australia) David Carter	7	6	4
(Netherlands) Rolf Thung	9	8	6

=== Ninth qualifier ===
First round
1	(Australia) Bob Carmichael	9	6
8	(France) Patrice Hagelauer	8	2
4	(Finland) Leo Palin	7	6
5	(Israel) Yair Wertheimer	5	1
2	(Republic of Ireland) Sean Sorensen	6	3
7	(Australia) Noel Jensen	2	2^{r}
3	(Australia) Ernie Ewert	6	6
6	(Japan) Kenichi Hirai	1	0

Second round
(Australia) Bob Carmichael	7	6
(Finland) Leo Palin	5	1
(Republic of Ireland) Sean Sorensen	6	6
(Australia) Ernie Ewert	3	4

Qualifying competition
(Australia) Bob Carmichael	3	6	6	8	6
(Republic of Ireland) Sean Sorensen	6	3	4	9	8

=== Tenth qualifier ===
First round
1	(Czechoslovakia) Jiří Granát	6	6
8	(Australia) Steven McInnes	4	3
4	(Australia) Greg Dingwall	6	6
5	(Australia) Gary Hutchinson	4	2
2	(Australia) Brad Drewett	6	6
7	(Argentina) José Luis Clerc	3	1
3	(Paraguay) Francisco Gonzalez	6	6
6	(Australia) Graeme Thomson	3	3

Second round
(Czechoslovakia) Jiří Granát	6	6
(Australia) Greg Dingwall	2	4
(Australia) Brad Drewett	6	4
(Paraguay) Francisco Gonzalez	8	6

Qualifying competition
(Czechoslovakia) Jiří Granát	6	6	7
(Paraguay) Francisco Gonzalez	3	4	5

=== Eleventh qualifier ===
First round
1	(Australia) Alvin Gardiner	3	6	6
8	(Australia) Noel Phillips	6	4	2
4	(United Kingdom) Chris Bradnam	6	7
5	(New Zealand) Gary Slater	2	5
2	(Australia) Noel Callaghan	6	6
7	(United States) W Sudol	2	3
3	(France) Christophe Casa	6	6
6	(Australia) Alan Caulfield	3	4

Second round
(Australia) Alvin Gardiner	6	4	6
(United Kingdom) Chris Bradnam	4	6	2
(Australia) Noel Callaghan	3	7	6
(France) Christophe Casa	6	5	1

Qualifying competition
(Australia) Alvin Gardiner	2	6	9	6
(Australia) Noel Callaghan	6	3	7	2

=== Twelfth qualifier ===
First round
1	(Australia) John Marks	3	6	7
8	(Argentina) Eduardo Bengoechea	6	3	5
4	(Czechoslovakia) Jan Šimbera	9	6
5	(United Kingdom) John Whiteford	7	1
2	(Australia) Warren Maher	6	2
7	(Pakistan) Munawar Iqbal	1	1^{r}
3	(Australia) Rod Frawley	6	6
6	(United States) Dean Martin	3	3

Second round
(Australia) John Marks	6	6
(Czechoslovakia) Jan Šimbera	2	4
(Australia) Warren Maher	6	6
(Australia) Rod Frawley	1	3

Qualifying competition
(Australia) John Marks	6	6	6
(Australia) Warren Maher	3	2	0

=== Thirteenth qualifier ===
First round
1	(United States) William Lofgren	6	3	11
8	(Argentina) Fernando Dalla Fontana	2	6	9
4	(United Kingdom) Rohun Beven	6	6
5	(Pakistan) Nasir Munir-Ahmed	1	3
2	(Japan) Jun Kamiwazumi	6	7
7	(Netherlands) Louk Sanders	4	5
3	(United States) Eliot Teltscher	6	6
6	(West Germany) Reinhart Probst	2	3

Second round
(United States) William Lofgren	6	3	11
(United Kingdom) Rohun Beven	3	6	9
(Japan) Jun Kamiwazumi	8	3
(United States) Eliot Teltscher	9	6

Qualifying competition
(United States) William Lofgren	4	5	4
(United States) Eliot Teltscher	6	7	6

=== Fourteenth qualifier ===
First round
1	(United States) Eric Friedler	6	6
8	(Ecuador) Colon Nunez	3	4
4	(United States) John Holladay	6	6
5	(Australia) Ray Kelly	4	3
2	(Australia) Peter Campbell	6	6
7	(Pakistan) Jamil Ahmed	2	3
3	(South Africa) Rory Chappell	6	8	7
6	(United States) Peter Lawler	3	9	5

Second round
(United States) Eric Friedler	6	8	3
(United States) John Holladay	4	9	6
(Australia) Peter Campbell	6	7	9
(South Africa) Rory Chappell	4	9	11

Qualifying competition
(United States) John Holladay	6	7	6
(South Africa) Rory Chappell	1	5	4

=== Fifteenth qualifier ===
First round
1	(Sweden) Douglas Palm	8	6
8	(Japan) Tetsu Kuramitsu	6	4
4	(Brazil) João Soares	6	8	8
5	(United States) Jerry Suyderhoud	2	9	6
2	(Australia) John Trickey	6	6
7	(Australia) Greg Braun	2	4
3	(United States) Rick Fisher	7	8	6
6	(Australia) Terry Rocavert	5	9	4

Second round
(Sweden) Douglas Palm	6	6
(Brazil) João Soares	2	4
(Australia) John Trickey	1	4
(United States) Rick Fisher	6	6

Qualifying competition
(Sweden) Douglas Palm	8	6	6	6
(United States) Rick Fisher	9	4	3	3

=== Sixteenth qualifier ===
First round
1	(West Germany) Ulrich Marten	6	6
8	(Argentina) Tito Vázquez	4	3
4	(United States) John McEnroe	6	6
5	(France) Christophe Roger-Vasselin	4	3
2	(Australia) Bill Bowrey	2	6	6
7	(United Kingdom) Christopher Wells	6	1	1
3	(France) Gilles Moretton	6	6
6	(Sweden) Tenny Svensson	2	1

Second round
(West Germany) Ulrich Marten	8	4	4
(United States) John McEnroe	6	6	6
(Australia) Bill Bowrey	3	5
(France) Gilles Moretton	6	7

Qualifying competition
(United States) John McEnroe	6	6	6
(France) Gilles Moretton	2	4	4
