= 1977 Wimbledon Championships – Women's singles qualifying =

Women's singles qualifying
- 1977 Wimbledon Championships

Events
Singles	men	women		boys	girls
Doubles	men	women	mixed	boys	girls
WC Singles	men	women	quad
WC Doubles	men	women	quad
Legends	men	women	seniors

Qualification
Singles	men	women
Doubles	men	women
- Wimbledon Championships

Players who neither had high enough rankings nor received wild cards to enter the main draw of the annual Wimbledon Tennis Championships participated in a qualifying tournament held one week before the event.

== Qualifiers ==
1. (United States) Rayni Fox
2. (Denmark) Helle Sparre
3. (United States) Erin Dignam
4. (United States) Aleida Spex
5. (Israel) Paulina Peled
6. (Australia) Christine Mattison
7. (Sweden) Nina Bohm
8. (United States) Anne Smith

== Lucky losers ==
1. (Argentina) Raquel Giscafré

== Qualifying draw ==
Key

- Q = Qualifier
- WC = Wild card
- LL = Lucky loser
- Alt = Alternate
- ITF = ITF entry
- PR = Protected ranking
- SR = Special ranking
- SE = Special exempt
- JE = Junior exempt
- JR = Junior Accelerator Programme entrant
- CO = College Accelerator Programme entrant
- NG = Next Gen Accelerator Program entrant
- w/o = Walkover
- r = Retired
- d = Defaulted

=== First qualifier ===
First round
1	(United States) Rayni Fox	6	6
8	(Australia) Jan Wilton	4	4
4	(France) Frédérique Thibault	6	6
5	(Argentina) Claudia Casabianca	4	1
2	(Australia) Chris O'Neil	6	6
7	(United Kingdom) Kate Glancy	1	3
3	(France) Nathalie Fuchs	7	3	6
6	(United States) Cane	5	6	3

Second round
(United States) Rayni Fox	6	6
(France) Frédérique Thibault	4	4
(Australia) Chris O'Neil	6	6
(France) Nathalie Fuchs	1	1

Qualifying competition
(United States) Rayni Fox	6	6
(Australia) Chris O'Neil	1	3

=== Second qualifier ===
First round
1	(Denmark) Helle Sparre	4	6	6
8	(Australia) Diane Evers	6	2	4
4	(Chile) Silvana Urroz	8	3	6
5	(South Africa) Gwynn Sammel	6	6	4
2	(United States) Laurie Tenney	6	6
7	(Switzerland) Monica Simmen	2	0
3	(United Kingdom) Penny Moor	6	7
6	(Australia) Nerida Gregory	3	5

Second round
(Denmark) Helle Sparre	6	6
(Chile) Silvana Urroz	2	2
(United States) Laurie Tenney	6	5	6
(United Kingdom) Penny Moor	1	7	2

Qualifying competition
(Denmark) Helle Sparre	6	6
(United States) Laurie Tenney	3	1

=== Third qualifier ===
First round
1	(United States) Erin Dignam	6	2	7
8	(United States) Gonzales	2	6	5
4	(United Kingdom) Charlotte Leatham	6	3	6
5	(United States) Roylee Bailey	2	6	4
2	(Sweden) Christina Sandberg	6	6
7	(New Zealand) Judy Connor	4	2
3	(Canada) Marjorie Blackwood	6	6
6	(United Kingdom) Debbie Jevans	1	3

Second round
(United States) Erin Dignam	6	8
(United Kingdom) Charlotte Leatham	3	6
(Sweden) Christina Sandberg	6	7
(Canada) Marjorie Blackwood	4	5

Qualifying competition
(United States) Erin Dignam	6	6
(Sweden) Christina Sandberg	4	0

=== Fourth qualifier ===
First round
1	(United States) Aleida Spex	6	6
8	(United States) Mary-Ann Colville	1	0
4	(Argentina) Elvira Weisenberger	6	8
5	(Australia) Cary	4	6
2	(New Zealand) Chris Newton	6	6
7	(Spain) Maria Victoria Baldovinos Cibeira	4	4
3	(United States) Beverly Buckley	7	6
6	(France) Michelle Rodriguez	5	4

Second round
(United States) Aleida Spex	6	7
(Argentina) Elvira Weisenberger	1	5
(New Zealand) Chris Newton	6	2	6
(United States) Beverly Buckley	1	6	3

Qualifying competition
(United States) Aleida Spex	6	6
(New Zealand) Chris Newton	2	3

=== Fifth qualifier ===
First round
1	(Israel) Paulina Peled	6	7
8	(United Kingdom) Clare Harrison	4	5
4	(Australia) Mary Sawyer	3	6	6
5	(Pakistan) Khan	6	4	2
2	(Argentina) Raquel Giscafré	3	6	6
7	(Canada) Vera Komar	6	1	4
3	(United States) Perry	9	6
6	(Czechoslovakia) Hana Strachoňová	8	2

Second round
(Israel) Paulina Peled	6	6
(Australia) Mary Sawyer	0	2
(Argentina) Raquel Giscafré	6	6
(United States) Perry	0	1

Qualifying competition
(Israel) Paulina Peled	6	6
(Argentina) Raquel Giscafré	3	1

=== Sixth qualifier ===
First round
1	(Australia) Christine Mattison	6	6
8	(United States) Cynthia-Ann Thomas	4	1
4	(Sweden) Margareta Forsgårdh	6	6
5	(United Kingdom) Linda Geeves	3	4
2	(Sweden) Helena Anliot	6	6
7	(United States) C. Bailey	3	2
3	(New Zealand) Sally Chapman	6	7
6	(United Kingdom) Julia Lloyd	3	5

Second round
(Australia) Christine Mattison	6	6
(Sweden) Margareta Forsgårdh	4	2
(Sweden) Helena Anliot	6	6
(New Zealand) Sally Chapman	3	3

Qualifying competition
(Australia) Christine Mattison	6	6
(Sweden) Helena Anliot	4	0

=== Seventh qualifier ===
First round
1	(Sweden) Nina Bohm	6	6	6
8	(United Kingdom) Annette Coe	8	0	4
4	(Australia) Julie Harrison	6	6
5	(United States) Mary McLean	3	3
2	(United States) Susan Hagey	6	6
7	(Australia) Kaye Hallam	3	2
3	(New Zealand) Pauline Elliott	7	6
6	(United Kingdom) Jill Cottrell	5	2

Second round
(Sweden) Nina Bohm	9	6
(Australia) Julie Harrison	8	2
(United States) Susan Hagey	2	6	6
(New Zealand) Pauline Elliott	6	2	2

Qualifying competition
(Sweden) Nina Bohm	6	6
(United States) Susan Hagey	4	2

=== Eighth qualifier ===
First round
1	(United States) Anne Smith	6	7
8	(Brazil) Patricia Medrado	1	5
4	(United Kingdom) Cathy Drury	6	6
5	(Australia) Kerryn Pratt	4	3
2	(Italy) Daniela Porzio	6	3	8
7	(Australia) Kym Ruddell	4	6	6
3	(Indonesia) Yolanda Soemarno	6	6
6	(Canada) Barbara Brankovska	4	4

Second round
(United States) Anne Smith	6	6
(United Kingdom) Cathy Drury	3	1
(Italy) Daniela Porzio	6	6
(Indonesia) Yolanda Soemarno	2	0

Qualifying competition
(United States) Anne Smith	6	6
(Italy) Daniela Porzio	3	2
