= 1976 Wimbledon Championships – Men's singles qualifying =

Men's singles qualifying
- 1976 Wimbledon Championships

Events
Singles	men	women		boys	girls
Doubles	men	women	mixed	boys	girls
WC Singles	men	women	quad
WC Doubles	men	women	quad
Legends	men	women	seniors

Qualification
Singles	men	women
Doubles	men	women	mixed
- Wimbledon Championships

Players who neither had high enough rankings nor received wild cards to enter the main draw of the annual Wimbledon Tennis Championships participated in a qualifying tournament held one week before the event. Several players withdrew from the main draw after qualifying had commenced, leading to the highest ranked players who lost in the final qualifying round to be entered into the main draw as lucky losers.

== Qualifiers ==
1. (India) Jayakumar Royappa
2. (Australia) Dale Collings
3. (United States) Chico Hagey
4. (Japan) Kenichi Hirai
5. (South Africa) John Yuill
6. (New Zealand) Russell Simpson
7. (United States) Gene Mayer
8. (Soviet Union) Teimuraz Kakulia
9. (Soviet Union) Vadim Borisov
10. (Australia) William Lloyd
11. (Australia) Paul McNamee
12. (Australia) Chris Kachel
13. (Australia) John Marks
14. (United Kingdom) Stephen Warboys
15. (United Kingdom) Mark Farrell
16. (United States) Raz Reid

== Lucky losers ==
1. (Czechoslovakia) Milan Holeček
2. (Netherlands) Rolf Thung
3. (United States) John Holladay

== Qualifying draw ==
Key

- Q = Qualifier
- WC = Wild card
- LL = Lucky loser
- Alt = Alternate
- ITF = ITF entry
- PR = Protected ranking
- SR = Special ranking
- SE = Special exempt
- JE = Junior exempt
- JR = Junior Accelerator Programme entrant
- CO = College Accelerator Programme entrant
- NG = Next Gen Accelerator Program entrant
- w/o = Walkover
- r = Retired
- d = Defaulted

=== First qualifier ===
First round
1	(India) Jayakumar Royappa	8	6	6
8	(New Zealand) Anthony Parun	9	3	2
4	(Chile) Álvaro Fillol	6	6
5	(United Kingdom) Christopher Kaskow	4	2
2	(Australia) Terry Rocavert	6	6
7	(United States) William Brown	1	2
3	(Greece) Nicolas Kelaidis	6	6
6	(United Kingdom) Paul Bradnam	2	4

Second round
(India) Jayakumar Royappa	6	8
(Chile) Álvaro Fillol	4	6
(Australia) Terry Rocavert	7	6
(Greece) Nicolas Kelaidis	5	4

Qualifying competition
(India) Jayakumar Royappa	6	6	1	9
(Australia) Terry Rocavert	2	4	6	8

=== Second qualifier ===
First round
1	(Australia) Dale Collings	8	4	6
8	(Switzerland) Petr Kanderal	6	6	3
4	(Spain) Ángel Giménez	6	6
5	(South Africa) Mike Myburg	2	4
2	(Soviet Union) Konstantin Pugaev	6	6
7	(United States) Dick Dell	0	1
3	(Australia) Ernie Ewert	3	6	6
6	(South Africa) Paul Avis	6	3	1

Second round
(Australia) Dale Collings	9	2	6
(Spain) Ángel Giménez	8	6	1
(Soviet Union) Konstantin Pugaev	5	6	6
(Australia) Ernie Ewert	7	2	3

Qualifying competition
(Australia) Dale Collings	6	8	6
(Soviet Union) Konstantin Pugaev	3	6	4

=== Third qualifier ===
First round
1	(United States) Chico Hagey	8	6	9
8	(New Zealand) Gary Slater	9	1	7
4	(United Kingdom) Christopher Wells	6	6
5	(Australia) Trevor Little	2	1
2	(France) Patrice Hagelauer	6	6
7	(Australia) Stephen Wright	1	1
3	(United States) Dean Martin	3	6	6
6	(United Kingdom) Martin Smith	6	3	4

Second round
(United States) Chico Hagey	6	4	6
(United Kingdom) Christopher Wells	2	6	2
(France) Patrice Hagelauer	8	6
(United States) Dean Martin	6	4

Qualifying competition
(United States) Chico Hagey	8	6	9
(France) Patrice Hagelauer	6	1	8

=== Fourth qualifier ===
First round
1	(Japan) Kenichi Hirai	6	6
8	(United Kingdom) Rohun Beven	4	4
4	(United Kingdom) Roger Webb	9	7
5	(Australia) Peter Campbell	7	5
2	(United States) John Holladay	6
7	(France) Denis Naegelen	2^{r}
3	(Australia) Ray Kelly	6	7	8
6	(Japan) Tetsu Kuramitsu	4	9	6

Second round
(Japan) Kenichi Hirai	9	6
(United Kingdom) Roger Webb	7	0
(United States) John Holladay	6	9
(Australia) Ray Kelly	3	8

Qualifying competition
(Japan) Kenichi Hirai	9	8	6
(United States) John Holladay	8	6	0

=== Fifth qualifier ===
First round
1	(South Africa) John Yuill	2	6	6
8	(Iran) Mansour Bahrami	6	3	4
4	(Czechoslovakia) Vladimír Zedník	9	6
5	(Finland) Leo Palin	7	3
2	(Mexico) Roberto Chávez	7	6
7	(Italy) Gianni Ocleppo	5	4
3	(Venezuela) Humphrey Hose	9	8	12
6	(United States) Peter Pearson	8	9	10

Second round
(South Africa) John Yuill	9	8	6
(Czechoslovakia) Vladimír Zedník	8	9	4
(Mexico) Roberto Chávez	6	9
(Venezuela) Humphrey Hose	1	7

Qualifying competition
(South Africa) John Yuill	6	5	8	7
(Mexico) Roberto Chávez	4	7	6	5

=== Sixth qualifier ===
First round
1	(New Zealand) Russell Simpson	6	6
8	(South Africa) Rory Chappell	0	3
4	(France) Jean-Louis Haillet	1	6	6
5	(Netherlands) Louk Sanders	6	3	4
2	(Netherlands) Rolf Thung	9	7
7	(United Kingdom) Chris Bradnam	8	5
3	(Australia) Warren Maher	7	7
6	(France) Pierre Barthès	5	5

Second round
(New Zealand) Russell Simpson	8	6	6
(France) Jean-Louis Haillet	9	3	3
(Netherlands) Rolf Thung	7	7	9
(Australia) Warren Maher	5	9	7

Qualifying competition
(New Zealand) Russell Simpson	6	6	3	6
(Netherlands) Rolf Thung	1	4	6	3

=== Seventh qualifier ===
First round
1	(United States) Gene Mayer	8	6	6
8	(Mexico) Emilio Montaño	9	3	3
4	(Colombia) Álvaro Betancur	6	6
5	(United States) Bruce Manson	3	2
2	(New Zealand) Peter Langsford	6	7
7	(Bolivia) Ramiro Benavides	3	5
3	(South Africa) Lucjan Sosnowski	6	3	6
6	(Argentina) Enrique Caviglia	3	6	0

Second round
(United States) Gene Mayer	6	6
(Colombia) Álvaro Betancur	3	2
(New Zealand) Peter Langsford	6	6
(South Africa) Lucjan Sosnowski	3	2

Qualifying competition
(United States) Gene Mayer	6	6	6
(New Zealand) Peter Langsford	4	2	2

=== Eighth qualifier ===
First round
1	(Soviet Union) Teimuraz Kakulia	6	6
8	(Australia) Victor Eke	4	4
4	(South Africa) David Schneider	6	6
5	(Czechoslovakia) František Pála	3	4
2	(Czechoslovakia) Tomáš Šmíd	9	4	6
7	(Sweden) Tenny Svensson	8	6	3
3	(United Kingdom) Jasper Cooper	3	6	6
6	(Jamaica) Richard Russell	6	4	4

Second round
(Soviet Union) Teimuraz Kakulia	9	6
(South Africa) David Schneider	7	4
(Czechoslovakia) Tomáš Šmíd	6	6
(United Kingdom) Jasper Cooper	3	2

Qualifying competition
(Soviet Union) Teimuraz Kakulia	6	6	6	8
(Czechoslovakia) Tomáš Šmíd	3	8	2	6

=== Ninth qualifier ===
First round
1	(Soviet Union) Vadim Borisov	8	6
8	(United States) Walter Redondo	6	1
4	(United States) Eugene Scott	7	6
5	(Mexico) Luis Baraldi	5	4
2	(Australia) John Trickey	3	9	8
7	(United States) Jeff Austin	6	8	6
3	(United States) John Geraghty	4	6	6
6	(United States) Steven Turner	6	4	4

Second round
(Soviet Union) Vadim Borisov	6	8	6
(United States) Eugene Scott	3	9	2
(Australia) John Trickey	6	8	6
(United States) John Geraghty	3	9	3

Qualifying competition
(Soviet Union) Vadim Borisov	6	6	7
(Australia) John Trickey	2	3	5

=== Tenth qualifier ===
First round
1	(Australia) William Lloyd	3	7	7
8	(Australia) Brad Drewett	6	5	5
4	(United States) Jai DiLouie	4	6	14
5	(Canada) Greg Halder	6	4	12
2	(Australia) Noel Callaghan	6	4	7
7	(India) Chiradip Mukerjea	2	6	5
3	(France) Jean-Claude Barclay	6	6
6	(Australia) Graeme Thomson	1	3

Second round
(Australia) William Lloyd	6	6
(United States) Jai DiLouie	4	3
(Australia) Noel Callaghan	6	6
(France) Jean-Claude Barclay	3	2

Qualifying competition
(Australia) William Lloyd	6	6	6
(Australia) Noel Callaghan	4	1	1

=== Eleventh qualifier ===
First round
1	(Australia) Paul McNamee	6	9
8	(United States) Armistead Neely	3	8
4	(United States) Peter Fleming	6	5	6
5	(Japan) Sachio Kato	3	7	4
2	(United States) Spencer Segura	6	6
7	(Ecuador) Eduardo Zuleta	1	2
3	(Australia) Simon Clarke	6	6
6	(Japan) Yuji Tezuka	4	4

Second round
(Australia) Paul McNamee	6	6
(United States) Peter Fleming	4	1
(United States) Spencer Segura	9	6
(Australia) Simon Clarke	8	2

Qualifying competition
(Australia) Paul McNamee	6	6	7
(United States) Spencer Segura	2	4	5

=== Twelfth qualifier ===
First round
1	(Australia) Chris Kachel	9	6
8	(United States) Larry Parker	7	3
4	(India) Anand Amritraj	7	6
5	(Australia) Peter McNamara	5	2
2	(Czechoslovakia) Jan Šimbera	8	7	8
7	(United Kingdom) John Paish	6	9	6
3	(France) Jean-Baptiste Chanfreau	3	7	7
6	(Japan) Kiyoshi Tanabe	6	5	5

Second round
(Australia) Chris Kachel	6	8	6
(India) Anand Amritraj	4	9	4
(Czechoslovakia) Jan Šimbera	6	6
(France) Jean-Baptiste Chanfreau	4	3

Qualifying competition
(Australia) Chris Kachel	6	6	2	6	6
(Czechoslovakia) Jan Šimbera	4	4	6	8	3

=== Thirteenth qualifier ===
First round
1	(Australia) John Marks	6	6
8	(South Africa) Graham Silberman	1	1
4	(Australia) Alvin Gardiner	9	6
5	(United States) Richard Meyer	8	2
2	(United Kingdom) Tony Lloyd	2	6	6
7	(Belgium) Bernard Mignot	6	4	1
3	(Australia) Noel Jensen	4	6	6
6	(France) Christophe Casa	6	3	2

Second round
(Australia) John Marks	4	6	6
(Australia) Alvin Gardiner	6	2	3
(United Kingdom) Tony Lloyd	6	6
(Australia) Noel Jensen	3	1

Qualifying competition
(Australia) John Marks	6	6	6
(United Kingdom) Tony Lloyd	3	0	0

=== Fourteenth qualifier ===
First round
1	(United Kingdom) Stephen Warboys	6	6
8	(United Kingdom) John Whiteford	3	2
4	(United States) George Hardie	6	6
5	(Romania) Ionel Santeiu	4	3
2	(Pakistan) Saeed Meer	9	4	8
7	(United Kingdom) William Gowans	7	6	6
3	(Brazil) João Soares	9	6
6	(South Africa) Eddie Edwards	8	2

Second round
(United Kingdom) Stephen Warboys	7	4	6
(United States) George Hardie	5	6	4
(Pakistan) Saeed Meer	6	6	7
(Brazil) João Soares	8	4	5

Qualifying competition
(United Kingdom) Stephen Warboys	6	9	8	6	10
(Pakistan) Saeed Meer	3	8	9	8	8

=== Fifteenth qualifier ===
First round
1	(United Kingdom) Mark Farrell	2	6	6
8	(New Zealand) John Mills	6	2	3
4	(Australia) Bob Rheinberger	6	6
5	(India) Ashok Amritraj	2	3
2	(Czechoslovakia) Milan Holeček	6	6
7	(Australia) Robert Casey	4	4
3	(France) Christophe Roger-Vasselin	6	6
6	(United Kingdom) Nigel Sears	0	2

Second round
(United Kingdom) Mark Farrell	7	6
(Australia) Bob Rheinberger	5	3
(Czechoslovakia) Milan Holeček	9	3	6
(France) Christophe Roger-Vasselin	8	6	3

Qualifying competition
(United Kingdom) Mark Farrell	2	6	9	6
(Czechoslovakia) Milan Holeček	6	3	7	2

=== Sixteenth qualifier ===
First round
1	(United States) Raz Reid	6	8
8	(France) Jean Lovera	3	6
4	(Australia) David Carter	7	6
5	(United Kingdom) Andrew Jarrett	5	4
2	(Ecuador) Ricardo Ycaza	6	6
7	(Argentina) Tito Vázquez	4	4
3	(United States) Charles Strode	6	6
6	(Australia) Stephen Myers	3	4

Second round
(United States) Raz Reid	6	8	6
(Australia) David Carter	2	9	4
(Ecuador) Ricardo Ycaza	8	7
(United States) Charles Strode	6	5

Qualifying competition
(United States) Raz Reid	6	6	7	6
(Ecuador) Ricardo Ycaza	1	8	5	4
