= 1977 Wimbledon Championships – Mixed doubles =

Mixed doubles
- 1977 Wimbledon Championships
- Final date: 3 July 1977
- 1976 Champions: (Australia) Tony Roche (France) Françoise Dürr

Final
- Champions: (South Africa) Bob Hewitt (South Africa) Greer Stevens
- Runners-up: (South Africa) Frew McMillan (Netherlands) Betty Stöve
- Score: 3–6, 7–5, 6–4

Details
- Draw: 48
- Seeds: 4

Events
Singles	men	women		boys	girls
Doubles	men	women	mixed	boys	girls
← 1976 ·	Wimbledon Championships	· 1978 →

Tony Roche and Françoise Dürr were the defending champions, but Roche did not compete. Dürr partnered with Marty Riessen but lost in the third round to Bob Hewitt and Greer Stevens.

Hewitt and Stevens defeated Frew McMillan and Betty Stöve in the final, 3–6, 7–5, 6–4 to win the mixed doubles tennis title at the 1977 Wimbledon Championships.

== Seeds ==
1. (South Africa) Frew McMillan / (Netherlands) Betty Stöve (final)
2. (Australia) Phil Dent / (United States) Billie Jean King (semifinals)
3. (United States) Marty Riessen / (France) Françoise Dürr (third round)
4. (United States) Dennis Ralston / (United States) Martina Navratilova (semifinals)

Click on the seed number of a player to go to their draw section.

== Draw ==
=== Key ===
- Q = Qualifier
- WC = Wild card
- LL = Lucky loser
- Alt = Alternate
- SE = Special exempt
- PR = Protected ranking
- ITF = ITF entry
- JE = Junior exempt
- w/o = Walkover
- r = Retired
- d = Defaulted
- SR = Special ranking

=== Finals ===
Quarterfinals
1	(South Africa) Frew McMillan (Netherlands) Betty Stöve	9	6
(Australia) Allan Stone (United States) Ann Kiyomura	7	4
4	(United States) Dennis Ralston (United States) Martina Navratilova	6	6	10
(United States) John McEnroe (United States) Mary Carillo	8	3	8
(Australia) Neale Fraser (Australia) Judy Dalton	3	2
(South Africa) Bob Hewitt (South Africa) Greer Stevens	6	6
(United States) Raz Reid (Australia) Kerry Reid	3	6	7
2	(Australia) Phil Dent (United States) Billie Jean King	6	1	9

Semifinals
1	(South Africa) Frew McMillan (Netherlands) Betty Stöve	5	6	12
4	(United States) Dennis Ralston (United States) Martina Navratilova	7	4	10
(South Africa) Bob Hewitt (South Africa) Greer Stevens	5	6	7
2	(Australia) Phil Dent (United States) Billie Jean King	7	4	5

Final
1	(South Africa) Frew McMillan (Netherlands) Betty Stöve	6	5	4
(South Africa) Bob Hewitt (South Africa) Greer Stevens	3	7	6

=== Top half ===
==== Section 1 ====
First round
1	(South Africa) F McMillan (Netherlands) B Stöve	6	1	6
(United Kingdom) A Jarrett (United Kingdom) D Jevans	2	6	2
(India) V Amritraj (United States) K May
(Australia) M Edmondson (United Kingdom) A Coe	w/o
(Australia) A Stone (United States) A Kiyomura	6	9
(United Kingdom) D Lloyd (United Kingdom) L Charles	4	8
(Australia) J Marks (United Kingdom) L Blachford	3	9	6
(Australia) N Callaghan (Australia) C Matison	6	7	3

Second round
1	(South Africa) F McMillan (Netherlands) B Stöve	6	6
(South Africa) W Prinsloo (South Africa) T Harford	4	3
(Australia) C Dibley (Australia) H Cawley	3	6	3
(Australia) M Edmondson (United Kingdom) A Coe	6	1	6
(Australia) E Ewert (Sweden) M Wikstedt	3	6	4
(Australia) A Stone (United States) A Kiyomura	6	4	6
(United Kingdom) R Drysdale (United Kingdom) L Beaven	3	1
(Australia) J Marks (United Kingdom) L Blachford	6	6

Third round
1	(South Africa) F McMillan (Netherlands) B Stöve	7	9
(Australia) M Edmondson (United Kingdom) A Coe	5	7
(Australia) A Stone (United States) A Kiyomura	6	6
(Australia) J Marks (United Kingdom) L Blachford	3	4

Quarterfinals
1	(South Africa) F McMillan (Netherlands) B Stöve	9	6
(Australia) A Stone (United States) A Kiyomura	7	4

==== Section 2 ====
First round
4	(United States) D Ralston (United States) M Navratilova	6	6
(United Kingdom) K Wooldridge (United Kingdom) W Wooldridge	4	2
(United States) B Teacher (United States) C-A Thomas	3	5
(United States) K Walts (United States) K Shaw	6	7
(United States) J McEnroe (United States) M Carillo	5	9	7
(United Kingdom) R Wilson (United Kingdom) J Fayter	7	8	5
(Australia) R Carmichael (South Africa) I Kloss	6	3	6
(Japan) K Hirai (Japan) N Sato	3	6	3

Second round
4	(United States) D Ralston (United States) M Navratilova	9	6
(United States) C Pasarell (United States) J Anthony	7	4
(United States) K Walts (United States) K Shaw	9	1	2
(South Africa) B Mitton (South Africa) B Cuypers	8	6	6
(United Kingdom) J Lloyd (Switzerland) M Simmen	4	3
(United States) J McEnroe (United States) M Carillo	6	6
(United Kingdom) J Smith (United Kingdom) C Molesworth	5	6	4
(Australia) R Carmichael (South Africa) I Kloss	7	4	6

Third round
4	(United States) D Ralston (United States) M Navratilova	6	6
(South Africa) B Mitton (South Africa) B Cuypers	1	4
(United States) J McEnroe (United States) M Carillo	6	5	6
(Australia) R Carmichael (South Africa) I Kloss	2	7	2

Quarterfinals
4	(United States) D Ralston (United States) M Navratilova	6	6	10
(United States) J McEnroe (United States) M Carillo	8	3	8

==== Section 3 ====
First round
(United States) J Holladay (United States) T Holladay
(Australia) N Fraser (Australia) J Dalton	w/o
(Australia) C Letcher (Australia) P Whytcross	6	4	6
(South Africa) J Yuill (United States) S Tolleson	3	6	4
(United States) J Borowiak (United States) P Teeguarden	3	6	0
(South Africa) D Joubert (South Africa) M Kruger	6	3	6
(United Kingdom) J Feaver (United Kingdom) L Mottram	1	2
3	(United States) M Riessen (France) F Dürr	6	6

Second round
(Australia) N Fraser (Australia) J Dalton	w/o
(United States) V Gerulaitis (United States) R Gerulaitis
(United States) P Fleming (United States) E Nagelsen
(Australia) C Letcher (Australia) P Whytcross	w/o
(South Africa) R Hewitt (South Africa) G Stevens	7	6
(South Africa) D Joubert (South Africa) M Kruger	5	2
(Rhodesia) C Dowdeswell (South Africa) D Boshoff	1	7
3	(United States) M Riessen (France) F Dürr	6	9

Third round
(Australia) N Fraser (Australia) J Dalton	2	7	6
(Australia) C Letcher (Australia) P Whytcross	6	5	4
(South Africa) R Hewitt (South Africa) G Stevens	6	7
3	(United States) M Riessen (France) F Dürr	3	5

Quarterfinals
(Australia) N Fraser (Australia) J Dalton	3	2
(South Africa) R Hewitt (South Africa) G Stevens	6	6

==== Section 4 ====
First round
(United States) J Hagey (United States) S Hagey	3	6	4
(United States) M Machette (United States) S Walsh	6	4	6
(Australia) W Bowrey (Australia) K Ruddell	4	2
(Australia) C Kachel (Australia) C O'Neil	6	6
(United States) A Mayer (United States) R Casals	w/o
(United States) F McNair (United States) R Fox
(United Kingdom) R Lewis (United Kingdom) S Mappin	3	4
(Australia) R Ruffels (United Kingdom) V Wade	6	6

Second round
(United States) M Machette (United States) S Walsh	6	6
(Sweden) J Norbäck (Sweden) N Bohm	3	4
(United States) G Reid (Australia) K Reid	3	6	6
(Australia) C Kachel (Australia) C O'Neil	6	4	1
(Australia) S Docherty (United States) P Bostrom	w/o
(United States) A Mayer (United States) R Casals
(Australia) R Ruffels (United Kingdom) V Wade	5	2
2	(Australia) P Dent (United States) BJ King	7	6

Third round
(United States) M Machette (United States) S Walsh	9	2	3
(United States) G Reid (Australia) K Reid	8	6	6
(Australia) S Docherty (United States) P Bostrom	2	4
2	(Australia) P Dent (United States) BJ King	6	6

Quarterfinals
(United States) G Reid (Australia) K Reid	3	6	7
2	(Australia) P Dent (United States) BJ King	6	1	9
