= Bhanu Nunna =

Indian tennis player

- Full name: Nunna Bhanumurthy
- Country (sports): India
- Born: 13 November 1954 (age 70)
- Plays: Right-handed

Singles
- Career record: 1–11
- Highest ranking: No. 199 (14 June 1976)

Grand Slam singles results
- Wimbledon: Q1 (1977)

Doubles
- Career record: 3–17

Grand Slam doubles results
- French Open: 1R (1979)
- Wimbledon: 1R (1977)

Nunna Bhanumurthy (born 13 November 1954), known as Bhanu Nunna, is an Indian former professional tennis player.

A right-handed player, Nunna featured on the professional tour in the late 1970s, after playing college tennis in the United States for Clemson University. He reached a career high singles ranking of 199 in the world.

Competing on the Grand Prix circuit, his best performance was a runner-up finish in the doubles at the 1976 Indian Open, partnering Chiradip Mukerjea. He made the singles second round of the 1979 Sarasota indoor tournament, where he fell to Ilie Nastase.

Nunna appeared in the men's doubles main draws at the 1977 Wimbledon Championships and 1979 French Open.

== Grand Prix career finals ==
=== Doubles: 1 (0–1) ===
Result	W-L	Date	Tournament	Surface	Partner	Opponents	Score
Loss	0–1	Nov 1976	Bangalore, India	Clay	(India) Chiradip Mukerjea	(Australia) Bob Carmichael (Australia) Ray Ruffels	2–6, 6–7
