= Jane Stratton =

American tennis player

- Full name: Jane Stratton
- Country (sports): United States
- Born: August 10, 1953 (age 72)

Singles

Grand Slam singles results
- French Open: 1R (1976, 1978, 1979)
- Wimbledon: 3R (1977, 1980)
- US Open: 1R (1977, 1980)

Doubles

Grand Slam doubles results
- French Open: 1R (1976, 1978, 1979)
- Wimbledon: QF (1977)
- US Open: QF (1975)
Medal record
Representing United States
Summer Universiade
Bronze medal – third place	1973 Moscow	Doubles

Jane Stratton (born August 10, 1953) is a former professional tennis player from the United States.

== Biography ==
Stratton grew up in Utah and was the first woman to receive an athletic scholarship to the University of Utah. She played collegiate tennis for four years, earning All-American honors on three occasions. During this time, she competed at the 1973 Summer Universiade and won a bronze medal in the women's doubles.

On the professional circuit, she was most successful as a doubles player. She was runner-up in the doubles at two tour events: the 1975 Canadian Open and Pittsburgh Open in 1979. At both the 1975 US Open and 1977 Wimbledon Championships, she was a women's doubles quarterfinalist, partnering JoAnne Russell and Mimi Wikstedt respectively. She also made the quarterfinals of the mixed doubles at the 1979 Wimbledon Championships with David Sherbeck. In singles, she reached the third round at Wimbledon in 1977 and 1980.

Following her retirement, she taught tennis in Salt Lake City, then in 1983 founded a company named Promotion Sports, with former tennis player Raquel Giscafré. The pair went on to run the Southern California Open.

== WTA Tour finals ==
=== Doubles (0–2) ===
Result	Date	Tournament	Tier	Surface	Partner	Opponents	Score
Loss	Aug 1975	Toronto, Canada	Grand Prix	Clay	(United States) JoAnne Russell	(United States) Julie Anthony (Australia) Margaret Court	2–6, 4–6
Loss	Sep 1979	Pittsburgh, U.S.	Colgate Series	Hard	(United States) Bunny Bruning	(United Kingdom) Sue Barker (United States) Candy Reynolds	3–6, 2–6
