= Jeremy Cohen =

Jeremy Cohen may refer to:

- Spike Cohen (born 1982), American political candidate
- Jeremy Cohen (tennis) (1955–2004), American tennis player
