= WTA Montreal =

Defunct tennis tournament
- Event name: World Tennis Classic (1978); Player's Challenge Classic (1980)
- Tour: WTA Tour (1978, 1980)
- Founded: 1978; 47 years ago
- Abolished: 1980; 45 years ago
- Editions: 2
- Surface: Hard (1978, 1980)

The WTA Montreal is a defunct WTA Tour affiliated tennis tournament played twice, in 1978 and 1980. It was held in Montreal, Quebec, Canada and played on indoor hard courts in 1978 and on outdoor hard courts in 1980.

== Results ==
=== Singles ===
| Year | Champion | Runner-up | Score |
|---|---|---|---|
| 1978 | (United States) Caroline Stoll | (France) Françoise Dürr | 6–3, 6–2 |
| 1979 | Not Held | | |
| 1980 | (United States) Martina Navratilova | (South Africa) Greer Stevens | 6–2, 6–1 |

=== Doubles ===
| Year | Champion | Runner-up | Score |
|---|---|---|---|
| 1978 | (United States) Julie Anthony (United States) Billie Jean King | (South Africa) Ilana Kloss (South Africa) Marise Kruger | 6–4, 6–4 |
| 1979 | Not Held | | |
| 1980 | (United States) Pam Shriver (United States) Anne Smith | (United States) Ann Kiyomura (South Africa) Greer Stevens | 3–6, 6–6 ret. |
