= Alison McDade =

South African tennis player

- Full name: Alison McDade (nee McMillan)
- Country (sports): South Africa

Singles

Grand Slam singles results
- French Open: 1R (1976)
- Wimbledon: 3R (1977)

Doubles

Grand Slam doubles results
- Wimbledon: 2R (1976, 1977)

Alison McDade (born 1950s) is a South African former professional tennis player.

Active on tour in the 1970s, McDade originally competed under her maiden name of Alison McMillan. Her most notable performance was a third round appearance at the 1977 Wimbledon Championships, where following a first round bye she defeated Michèle Gurdal, before being eliminated by Terry Holladay.
