= Stephanie Tolleson =

American tennis player

- Country (sports): United States
- Born: March 25, 1956 (age 69)

Singles

Grand Slam singles results
- Wimbledon: 1R (1977, 1978)
- US Open: 3R (1978)

Doubles

Grand Slam doubles results
- Wimbledon: 2R (1977, 1978)
- US Open: 2R (1976, 1978)

Grand Slam mixed doubles results
- Wimbledon: 1R (1977)
- US Open: 1R (1976)
Medal record
Pan American Games
Gold medal – first place	1975 Mexico City	Women's doubles

Stephanie Tolleson (born March 25, 1956) is an American former sports executive and professional tennis player.

Raised in Phoenix, Arizona, Tolleson was a two-time All-American at Trinity University and claimed the NCAA national collegiate singles championship in 1975. She won a gold medal in women's doubles at the 1975 Pan American Games, with Trinity teammate Sandy Stap as her partner.

After college she competed on the professional tour, with highlights including an upset win over Sue Barker at the 1978 Eastbourne International and a third round appearance at the 1978 US Open.

Once she finished her playing career, Tolleson began a 25-year career as a sports executive at IMG. She ran the men's and women's tennis division and her client roster included four # 1 ranked tennis players in the world - Venus Williams, Serena Williams, Monica Seles, and Arantxa Sanchez-Vicario. Tolleson also handled the worldwide title sponsorship sales on behalf of the WTA Tour. Additionally, she oversaw IMG's worldwide events division which included tennis, golf, skating, winter sports, skating and lifestyle and fashion events.

In 2005, Sports Business Journal named her the #4 Most Influential Women in Sports.

Tolleson is currently the Chief Operating Officer for Hawken School, a K-12 co-ed independent school in Gates Mills, Ohio. For the past three years, Hawken has been rated the #1 Academic school in Ohio.

Tolleson is married to former sports executive Peter Johnson.
