= Pauline Hanson (tennis) =

New Zealand tennis player

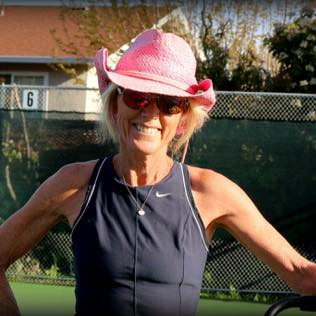
- Hanson in 2017
- Country (sports): New Zealand
- Born: 15 October 1955 (age 70)

Grand Slam singles results
- Australian Open: 1R (1977)
- Wimbledon: Q2 (1977)
- US Open: 2R (1977)

Grand Slam doubles results
- US Open: 1R (1977)

Pauline Hanson (born 15 October 1955), formerly Pauline Elliott, is a New Zealand former professional tennis player.

Hanson represented the New Zealand Federation Cup team from 1975 to 1977, featuring in eight rubbers. She played in the singles main draws of both the US Open and Australian Open in 1977.

During the 1980s, she moved to the United States, and she has been a longtime tennis pro at the Rolling Hills Club in Novato, California. She has competed as a marathon runner, and she had a quick enough time to qualify for the 1984 United States Olympic Trials, but as a New Zealand national, she was unable to participate. Since then, she has become a U.S. citizen, and married Jack Hanson, a local television reporter who passed away in 2023.
