= Chris Kaskow =

British tennis player

- Full name: Christopher Kaskow
- Country (sports): Great Britain

Singles
- Highest ranking: No. 397 (16 Jan 1978)

Grand Slam singles results
- Wimbledon: Q2 (1977)

Doubles
- Career record: 0–1

Grand Slam doubles results
- Wimbledon: 1R (1977)

Christopher Kaskow is a British former professional tennis player.

Kaskow grew up in Torquay and was active on tour during the 1970s, reaching a singles world ranking of 397. He featured in the men's doubles main draw of the 1977 Wimbledon Championships, partnering with Tony Lloyd.
