= Peter Johnson (sports executive) =

American sports executive (born 1950)

- Born: Peter Clark Johnson; January 4, 1950 (age 76); Milwaukee, Wisconsin
- Education: University of Delaware, Wharton School of the University of Pennsylvania
- Occupation: Sports executive
- Spouse: Stephanie Tolleson

Peter Clark Johnson (born January 4, 1950) is an American sports executive.

== Early life and education ==
Johnson was born in Milwaukee, Wisconsin and was raised in Bryn Mawr, Pennsylvania. He went to high school at Penn Charter in Philadelphia and attended the University of Delaware, where he was a member of the 1971 National Champion Division I-AA Football team. After graduating, he played in the NFL for the Buffalo Bills and Detroit Lions. Johnson received his MBA from the Wharton School of the University of Pennsylvania.

== Career ==
In 1976, Johnson started his career at IMG, the world's largest sports, entertainment and media company, where he worked for thirty years. He was the COO, and then the CEO - Sports and Entertainment. At the time, IMG had 3,000 employees in 70 offices in 35 countries.

In 2004, Sports Business Journal named Johnson the Most Influential Agent in Sports. Advertising Age named him the "Top Marketer". In 2005, Sports Business Journal named him the #25 Most Powerful Person in Sports.

== Personal life ==
Johnson lives in Cleveland, Ohio and is married to former IMG executive Stephanie Tolleson.
