= Annette Coe =

British tennis player

- Country (sports): United Kingdom
- Born: 4 March 1954 (age 71)
- Plays: Left-handed

Singles

Grand Slam singles results
- Wimbledon: 2R (1974, 1976)

Doubles

Grand Slam doubles results
- Wimbledon: 2R (1975)

Grand Slam mixed doubles results
- Wimbledon: 3R (1977)

Annette Coe (born 4 March 1954) is a British former professional tennis player.

A left-handed player from Plymouth, Coe was active on tour in the 1970s. In her two singles second round appearance at Wimbledon, she had a narrow loss to Janet Young in 1974 but was double bageled by the top seeded Chris Evert in 1976. She made round of 16 in mixed doubles at the 1977 Wimbledon Championships (with Mark Edmondson).
