= 1977 Wimbledon Championships – Boys' singles =

Boys' singles
- 1977 Wimbledon Championships

Final
- Champion: (United States) Van Winitsky
- Runner-up: (United States) Eliot Teltscher
- Score: 6–1, 1–6, 8–6

Events
Singles	men	women		boys	girls
Doubles	men	women	mixed	boys	girls
← 1976 ·	Wimbledon Championships	· 1978 →

Van Winitsky defeated Eliot Teltscher in the final, 6–4, 7–5 to win the boys' singles tennis title at the 1977 Wimbledon Championships.

== Seeds ==
1. (United Kingdom) Trevor Heath (third round)
2. (Australia) Ray Kelly (third round)
3. (United States) Eliot Teltscher (final)
4. (France) Yannick Noah (third round)
5. (Australia) Charlie Fancutt (quarterfinals)
6. (Czechoslovakia) Ivan Lendl (quarterfinals)
7. (United States) Robert Van't Hof (quarterfinals)
8. (West Germany) Wolfgang Popp (second round)

Click on the seed number of a player to go to their draw section.

== Draw ==
=== Key ===
- Q = Qualifier
- WC = Wild card
- LL = Lucky loser
- Alt = Alternate
- SE = Special exempt
- PR = Protected ranking
- ITF = ITF entry
- JE = Junior exempt
- w/o = Walkover
- r = Retired
- d = Defaulted
- SR = Special ranking

=== Finals ===
Quarterfinals
(Romania) Andrei Dîrzu	9	0	7
(United Kingdom) Michael Appleton	8	6	5
5	(Australia) Charlie Fancutt	1	4
(United States) Van Winitsky	6	6
3	(United States) Eliot Teltscher	6	6
6	(Czechoslovakia) Ivan Lendl	4	2
7	(United States) Robert Van't Hof	6	7	3
(France) Pascal Portes	4	9	6

Semifinals
(Romania) Andrei Dîrzu	6	3	2
(United States) Van Winitsky	3	6	6
3	(United States) Eliot Teltscher	3	8	6
(France) Pascal Portes	6	6	1

Final
(United States) Van Winitsky	6	1	8
3	(United States) Eliot Teltscher	1	6	6

=== Top half ===
==== Section 1 ====
First round
(Republic of Ireland) P Lawlor	0	3
(Argentina) Gustavo Guerrero	6	6
(Romania) Andrei Dîrzu	6	6
(Egypt) T Shawky-Moustafa	1	4
(Venezuela) D Scotti	5	4
(Socialist Federal Republic of Yugoslavia) Marko Ostoja	7	6
(Austria) Helmar Stiegler	2	2
(United Kingdom) Michael Appleton	6	6

Second round
1	(United Kingdom) Trevor Heath	6	7	6
(Argentina) G Guerrero	4	9	1
(Norway) T Rosenvinge	7	2
(Romania) A Dîrzu	9	6
(West Germany) W Popp	2	3
(Socialist Federal Republic of Yugoslavia) M Ostoja	6	6
(United Kingdom) M Appleton	6	6
(Poland) M Najfeld	2	2

Third round
1	(United Kingdom) T Heath	4	3
(Romania) A Dîrzu	6	6
(Socialist Federal Republic of Yugoslavia) M Ostoja	1	1
(United Kingdom) M Appleton	6	6

Quarterfinals
(Romania) A Dîrzu	9	0	7
(United Kingdom) M Appleton	8	6	5

==== Section 2 ====
First round
(Israel) Shau Puni	4	9	6
(Brazil) Celso Sacomandi	6	7	4
(United Kingdom) Harvey Becker	6	3	8
(India) Ramesh Krishnan	4	6	10
(Switzerland) Roland Stadler	6	6
(South Africa) David Segal	4	4
(Bolivia) M Navarro	0	2
(Australia) Paul Dougherty	6	6
(United States) Van Winitsky	6	6
(Belgium) Bernard Boileau	4	3

Second round
5	(Australia) Charlie Fancutt	6	6
(Israel) S Puni	2	0
(India) R Krishnan	6	6
(Jamaica) Stuart Sarnia	2	2
(France) Yannick Noah	6	6
(Switzerland) R Stadler	1	2
(Australia) P Dougherty	3	2
(United States) V Winitsky	6	6

Third round
5	(Australia) C Fancutt	4	6	8
(India) R Krishnan	6	3	6
(France) Y Noah	5	8
(United States) V Winitsky	7	9

Quarterfinals
5	(Australia) C Fancutt	1	4
(United States) V Winitsky	6	6

=== Bottom half ===
==== Section 3 ====
First round
(Sweden) Stefan Simonsson	4	6	6
(South Africa) Rory Chappell	6	2	4
(Romania) Florin Segărceanu	6	6
(Peru) Alberto Franco	4	2
(Iran) Y Saleh	1	3
(United Kingdom) Jeremy Dier	6	6
(Brazil) Cássio Motta	6	6
(New Zealand) Brett Hibbert	4	1

Second round
(Sweden) S Simonsson
(Colombia) Mauricio Posso	w/o
(Romania) F Segărceanu	4	2
3	(United States) Eliot Teltscher	6	6
(Italy) Patrizio Parrini	w/o
(United Kingdom) J Dier
(Brazil) C Motta	4	6	2
6	(Czechoslovakia) Ivan Lendl	6	4	6

Third round
(Sweden) S Simonsson	0	2
3	(United States) E Teltscher	6	6
(United Kingdom) J Dier	5	3
6	(Czechoslovakia) I Lendl	7	6

Quarterfinals
3	(United States) E Teltscher	6	6
6	(Czechoslovakia) I Lendl	4	2

==== Section 4 ====
First round
(United Kingdom) Neil Rayner	9	6
(Pakistan) J Ahmad	8	2
(Argentina) Eduardo Bengoechea	6	6
(Singapore) M Sundin	0	0
(Chile) Hans Gildemeister	4	1
(France) Pascal Portes	6	6
(Netherlands) Marc Albert	6	3	6
(Mexico) Guillermo Stevens	3	6	3

Second round
(United Kingdom) N Rayner	1	6	6
(Canada) Bill Cowan	6	4	2
(Argentina) E Bengoechea	2	2
7	(United States) Robert Van't Hof	6	6
(Denmark) Michael Mortensen	4	4
(France) P Portes	6	6
(Netherlands) M Albert	3	8
2	(Australia) Ray Kelly	6	9

Third round
(United Kingdom) N Rayner	3	2
7	(United States) R Van't Hof	6	6
(France) P Portes	6	8
2	(Australia) R Kelly	4	6

Quarterfinals
7	(United States) R Van't Hof	6	7	3
(France) P Portes	4	9	6
