= 1977 Wimbledon Championships – Women's doubles =

Women's doubles
- 1977 Wimbledon Championships
- Final date: 1 July 1977
- 1976 Champions: (United States) Chris Evert (Czechoslovakia) Martina Navratilova

Final
- Champions: (Australia) Helen Cawley (United States) JoAnne Russell
- Runners-up: (Netherlands) Betty Stöve (United States) Martina Navratilova
- Score: 6–3, 6–3

Details
- Draw: 48 (3 Q )
- Seeds: 8

Events
Singles	men	women		boys	girls
Doubles	men	women	mixed	boys	girls
← 1976 ·	Wimbledon Championships	· 1978 →

Chris Evert and Martina Navratilova were the defending champions, but decided not to play together. Evert partnered with Rosie Casals, but they lost in the second round to Helen Cawley and JoAnne Russell.

Cawley and Russell defeated Navratilova and Betty Stöve in the final, 6–3, 6–3 to win the ladies' doubles tennis title at the 1977 Wimbledon Championships.

== Seeds ==
1. (United States) Martina Navratilova / (Netherlands) Betty Stöve (final)
2. (United States) Rosie Casals / (United States) Chris Evert (second round)
3. (South Africa) Linky Boshoff / (South Africa) Ilana Kloss (quarterfinals)
4. (France) Françoise Dürr / (United Kingdom) Virginia Wade (semifinals)
5. (Australia) Kerry Reid / (South Africa) Greer Stevens (quarterfinals)
6. (United Kingdom) Sue Barker / (United States) Ann Kiyomura (third round)
7. (United Kingdom) Lesley Charles / (United Kingdom) Sue Mappin (semifinals)
8. (United States) Billie Jean King / (United States) Karen Susman (second round)

Click on the seed number of a player to go to their draw section.

== Draw ==
=== Key ===
- Q = Qualifier
- WC = Wild card
- LL = Lucky loser
- Alt = Alternate
- SE = Special exempt
- PR = Protected ranking
- ITF = ITF entry
- JE = Junior exempt
- w/o = Walkover
- r = Retired
- d = Defaulted
- SR = Special ranking

=== Finals ===
Quarterfinals
1	(United States) Martina Navratilova (Netherlands) Betty Stöve	6	6
(United States) Jane Stratton (Sweden) Mimmi Wikstedt	2	0
4	(France) Françoise Dürr (United Kingdom) Virginia Wade	7	7
5	(Australia) Kerry Reid (South Africa) Greer Stevens	5	5
7	(United Kingdom) Lesley Charles (United Kingdom) Sue Mappin	6	8	7
3	(South Africa) Linky Boshoff (South Africa) Ilana Kloss	3	9	5
(South Africa) Brigitte Cuypers (South Africa) Marise Kruger	9	4	2
(Australia) Helen Cawley (United States) JoAnne Russell	8	6	6

Semifinals
1	(United States) Martina Navratilova (Netherlands) Betty Stöve	6	6	6
4	(France) Françoise Dürr (United Kingdom) Virginia Wade	8	2	2
7	(United Kingdom) Lesley Charles (United Kingdom) Sue Mappin	3	4
(Australia) Helen Cawley (United States) JoAnne Russell	6	6

Final
1	(United States) Martina Navratilova (Netherlands) Betty Stöve	3	3
(Australia) Helen Cawley (United States) JoAnne Russell	6	6

=== Top half ===
==== Section 1 ====
First round
1	(United States) M Navratilova (Netherlands) B Stöve	6	7
(Australia) C Doerner (Australia) W Turnbull	2	5
(Uruguay) F Bonicelli (Argentina) R Giscafré	6	6
(United Kingdom) L Beaven (South Africa) Y Vermaak	3	2
(Socialist Federal Republic of Yugoslavia) M Jaušovec (Romania) V Ruzici	9	6
(United Kingdom) J Durie (United Kingdom) A Hobbs	7	2
(United States) L duPont (United States) J Newberry	1	6	4
(United States) J Stratton (Sweden) M Wikstedt	6	3	6

Second round
1	(United States) M Navratilova (Netherlands) B Stöve	6	6
LL	(United States) R Khan (United States) N Weigel	0	1
(Uruguay) F Bonicelli (Argentina) R Giscafré	4	3
(United Kingdom) A Jones (United Kingdom) W Wooldridge	6	6
6	(United Kingdom) S Barker (United States) A Kiyomura	6	6
(Socialist Federal Republic of Yugoslavia) M Jaušovec (Romania) V Ruzici	3	2
(United States) J Stratton (Sweden) M Wikstedt	9	6
(Sweden) I Bentzer (United States) S Tolleson	7	2

Third round
1	(United States) M Navratilova (Netherlands) B Stöve	6	7	6
(United Kingdom) A Jones (United Kingdom) W Wooldridge	3	9	4
6	(United Kingdom) S Barker (United States) A Kiyomura	5	3
(United States) J Stratton (Sweden) M Wikstedt	7	6

Quarterfinals
1	(United States) M Navratilova (Netherlands) B Stöve	6	6
(United States) J Stratton (Sweden) M Wikstedt	2	0

==== Section 2 ====
First round
4	(France) F Dürr (United Kingdom) V Wade	6	1	6
(United States) T Holladay (United States) K May	2	6	3
(United States) R Fox (United States) K Harter	7	1
Q	(Australia) C Matison (Australia) P Whytcross	9	6
5	(Australia) K Reid (South Africa) G Stevens	6	4	6
(United States) L Antonoplis (United States) A Smith	2	6	2
(United States) M Hamm (United States) C Reynolds	7	6
(United Kingdom) C Molesworth (United Kingdom) B Thompson	5	3

Second round
4	(France) F Dürr (United Kingdom) V Wade	6	6
(Italy) S Simmonds (United Kingdom) M Tyler	4	3
Q	(South Africa) G Sammel (South Africa) L Whitfield	3	7	1
Q	(Australia) C Matison (Australia) P Whytcross	6	5	6
5	(Australia) K Reid (South Africa) G Stevens	6	7
(United States) J Anthony (United States) E Nagelsen	3	5
(United States) M Hamm (United States) C Reynolds	w/o
(France) B Simon (France) F Thibault

Third round
4	(France) F Dürr (United Kingdom) V Wade	6	4	8
Q	(Australia) C Matison (Australia) P Whytcross	4	6	6
5	(Australia) K Reid (South Africa) G Stevens	6	6
(United States) M Hamm (United States) C Reynolds	2	0

Quarterfinals
4	(France) F Dürr (United Kingdom) V Wade	7	7
5	(Australia) K Reid (South Africa) G Stevens	5	5

=== Bottom half ===
==== Section 3 ====
First round
(United States) A-M Bruning (United States) S Walsh	3	6	1
(United States) T Austin (Australia) L Hunt	6	1	6
(New Zealand) J Connor (South Africa) T Harford	5	1
7	(United Kingdom) L Charles (United Kingdom) S Mappin	7	6
(United Kingdom) G Coles (United Kingdom) L Mottram	6	3
Q	(Australia) S Saliba (Australia) M Sawyer	8	6
(Romania) F Mihai (Israel) P Peled	3	2
3	(South Africa) D Boshoff (South Africa) I Kloss	6	6

Second round
(Australia) D Evers (Hungary) M Pinterová	4	0
(United States) T Austin (Australia) L Hunt	6	6
(South Africa) A McDade (Netherlands) E Vessies-Appel	4	5
7	(United Kingdom) L Charles (United Kingdom) S Mappin	6	7
(United States) C Meyer (Czechoslovakia) R Tomanová	6	6
Q	(Australia) S Saliba (Australia) M Sawyer	4	4
(Australia) J Dalton (Australia) K Ruddell	8	8
3	(South Africa) D Boshoff (South Africa) I Kloss	9	9

Third round
(United States) T Austin (Australia) L Hunt	2	4
7	(United Kingdom) L Charles (United Kingdom) S Mappin	6	6
(United States) C Meyer (Czechoslovakia) R Tomanová	3	6	3
3	(South Africa) D Boshoff (South Africa) I Kloss	6	3	6

Quarterfinals
7	(United Kingdom) L Charles (United Kingdom) S Mappin	6	8	7
3	(South Africa) D Boshoff (South Africa) I Kloss	3	9	5

==== Section 4 ====
First round
(United States) K Shaw (United States) V Ziegenfuss	6	6
LL	(United States) E Dignam (United States) C Lane	2	2
LL	(United Kingdom) P Moor (United States) J Preyer	1	3
(United States) P Bostrom (United States) M Carillo	6	6
(United Kingdom) C Drury (United Kingdom) C Harrison	6	2	2
(United Kingdom) J Fayter (Czechoslovakia) R Maršíková	4	6	6
(West Germany) H Eisterlehner (West Germany) I Riedel	1	1
2	(United States) R Casals (United States) C Evert	6	6

Second round
(United States) K Shaw (United States) V Ziegenfuss	4	7	4
(South Africa) B Cuypers (South Africa) M Kruger	6	5	6
(United States) P Bostrom (United States) M Carillo	7	6	6
8	(United States) BJ King (United States) K Susman	9	4	3
(United Kingdom) J Fayter (Czechoslovakia) R Maršíková	6	2	6
(Belgium) M Gurdal (Japan) N Sato	3	6	3
(Australia) H Cawley (United States) J Russell	6	7
2	(United States) R Casals (United States) C Evert	3	5

Third round
(South Africa) B Cuypers (South Africa) M Kruger	6	6
(United States) P Bostrom (United States) M Carillo	4	4
(United Kingdom) J Fayter (Czechoslovakia) R Maršíková	6	2
(Australia) H Cawley (United States) J Russell	8	6

Quarterfinals
(South Africa) B Cuypers (South Africa) M Kruger	9	4	2
(Australia) H Cawley (United States) J Russell	8	6	6
