= 1977 Wimbledon Championships – Women's singles =

Women's singles
- 1977 Wimbledon Championships
- 1976 Champion: (United States) Chris Evert

Final
- Champion: (United Kingdom) Virginia Wade
- Runner-up: (Netherlands) Betty Stöve
- Score: 4–6, 6–3, 6–1
- Date: 2 July 1977

Details
- Draw: 96 (8Q / 6WC)
- Seeds: 12

Events
Singles	men	women		boys	girls
Doubles	men	women	mixed	boys	girls
- Wimbledon Championships

Virginia Wade defeated Betty Stöve in the final, 4–6, 6–3, 6–1 to win the ladies' singles tennis title at the 1977 Wimbledon Championships. It was her third and last major singles title. She remains the most recent British woman to win the title. This would also be the last Grand Slam singles title by a British woman until Emma Raducanu's victory in the 2021 US Open.

Chris Evert was the defending champion, but lost in the semifinals to Wade.

This was the first time Wimbledon seeded more than eight players for the ladies' championship, increasing the number to twelve players; the number was further increased to 16 the following year.

== Seeds ==
1. (United States) Chris Evert (semifinals)
2. (United States) Martina Navratilova (quarterfinals)
3. (United Kingdom) Virginia Wade (champion)
4. (United Kingdom) Sue Barker (semifinals)
5. (United States) Billie Jean King (quarterfinals)
6. (United States) Rosie Casals (quarterfinals)
7. (Netherlands) Betty Stöve (final)
8. (Australia) Kerry Melville (quarterfinals)
9. (Australia) Dianne Fromholtz (withdrew)
10. (Socialist Federal Republic of Yugoslavia) Mima Jaušovec (third round)
11. (France) Françoise Dürr (third round)
12. (United States) Kathy May (fourth round)

Click on the seed number of a player to go to their draw section.

Dianne Fromholtz withdrew due to illness. She was replaced in the draw by lucky loser Chris O'Neil.

== Draw ==
Key

- Q = Qualifier
- WC = Wild card
- LL = Lucky loser
- Alt = Alternate
- ITF = ITF entry
- PR = Protected ranking
- SR = Special ranking
- SE = Special exempt
- JE = Junior exempt
- JR = Junior Accelerator Programme entrant
- CO = College Accelerator Programme entrant
- NG = Next Gen Accelerator Program entrant
- w/o = Walkover
- r = Retired
- d = Defaulted

=== Finals ===
Quarterfinals
1	(United States) Chris Evert	6	6
5	(United States) Billie Jean King	1	2
3	(United Kingdom) Virginia Wade	7	6
6	(United States) Rosie Casals	5	2
8	(Australia) Kerry Reid	3	4
4	(United Kingdom) Sue Barker	6	6
7	(Netherlands) Betty Stöve	9	3	6
2	(United States) Martina Navratilova	8	6	1

Semifinals
1	(United States) Chris Evert	2	6	1
3	(United Kingdom) Virginia Wade	6	4	6
4	(United Kingdom) Sue Barker	4	6	4
7	(Netherlands) Betty Stöve	6	2	6

Final
3	(United Kingdom) Virginia Wade	4	6	6
7	(Netherlands) Betty Stöve	6	3	1

=== Top half ===
==== Section 1 ====
First round
1	(United States) C Evert	6	6
(United States) R Gerulaitis	0	3
(Netherlands) E Vessies-Appel	6	3	6
(United States) M Hamm	4	6	2
Q	(United States) E Dignam	6	5	1
WC	(United Kingdom) B Thompson	2	7	6
(United States) M Struthers	1	0
(South Africa) G Stevens	6	6

Second round
1	(United States) C Evert	6	6
WC	(United Kingdom) W Wooldridge	0	2
(Netherlands) E Vessies-Appel	3	3
(United States) T Austin	6	6
(West Germany) K Ebbinghaus	6	6
WC	(United Kingdom) B Thompson	2	0
Q	(United States) A Spex	6	0	2
(South Africa) G Stevens	4	6	6

Third round
1	(United States) C Evert	6	6
(United States) T Austin	1	1
(West Germany) K Ebbinghaus	1	3
(South Africa) G Stevens	6	6

Fourth round
1	(United States) C Evert	8	6
(South Africa) G Stevens	6	4

==== Section 2 ====
First round
Q	(United States) A Smith	4	6	6
(Sweden) M Wikstedt	6	2	0
(United States) J Newberry	6	6
LL	(Argentina) R Giscafré	4	2
(Australia) W Turnbull	6	6
(West Germany) H Eisterlehner	2	1
(United Kingdom) M Tyler	4	6	2
(South Africa) M Kruger	6	2	6

Second round
5	(United States) BJ King	6	6	6
Q	(United States) A Smith	8	0	3
(Brazil) M Bueno	1	8	8
(United States) J Newberry	6	6	6
10	(Socialist Federal Republic of Yugoslavia) M Jaušovec	6	6
(Australia) W Turnbull	4	3
(South Africa) M Kruger	6	6
(France) F Guédy	3	2

Third round
5	(United States) BJ King	6	7
(Brazil) M Bueno	2	5
10	(Socialist Federal Republic of Yugoslavia) M Jaušovec	4	4
(South Africa) M Kruger	6	6

Fourth round
5	(United States) BJ King	4	6	6
(South Africa) M Kruger	6	0	1

==== Section 3 ====
First round
3	(United Kingdom) V Wade	6	6
WC	(United Kingdom) J Durie	2	2
(United Kingdom) J Fayter	2	6	6
Q	(Sweden) N Bohm	6	3	2
(Hungary) M Pinterová	1	1
Q	(Israel) P Peled	6	6
(United States) S Tolleson	2	3
(Romania) M Simionescu	6	6

Second round
3	(United Kingdom) V Wade	6	6
(United States) E Nagelsen	2	1
(South Africa) Y Vermaak	6	6
(United Kingdom) J Fayter	3	1
Q	(Israel) P Peled	4	6	4
Q	(United States) R Fox	6	4	6
(Romania) M Simionescu	6	7
(United States) C Reynolds	4	5

Third round
3	(United Kingdom) V Wade	6	6
(South Africa) Y Vermaak	1	2
Q	(United States) R Fox	5	2
(Romania) M Simionescu	7	6

Fourth round
3	(United Kingdom) V Wade	9	6
(Romania) M Simionescu	7	3

==== Section 4 ====
First round
6	(United States) R Casals	6	6
(South Africa) T Harford	3	1
(United States) J Russell	8	6
(United Kingdom) S Mappin	6	2
11	(France) F Dürr	6	8
(United States) L Forood	0	6
(Australia) P Whytcross	4	4
(South Africa) D Boshoff	6	6

Second round
6	(United States) R Casals	6	6
(United States) V Ziegenfuss	3	3
(United States) J Russell	6	7
LL	(United States) S Hagey	3	5
11	(France) F Dürr	6	7
(Romania) V Ruzici	3	5
(Australia) L Hunt	3	2
(South Africa) D Boshoff	6	6

Third round
6	(United States) R Casals	6	6
(United States) J Russell	1	1
11	(France) F Dürr	3	7
(South Africa) D Boshoff	6	9

Fourth round
6	(United States) R Casals	8	6
(South Africa) D Boshoff	6	3

=== Bottom half ===
==== Section 5 ====
First round
(Australia) C Doerner	6	6
(United States) A-M Bruning	3	1
(United Kingdom) L Mottram	3	1
12	(United States) K May	6	6
(United States) J Anthony	6	6
(Japan) N Sato	1	3
(United States) M Carillo	6	4	5
8	(Australia) K Reid	2	6	7

Second round
(United States) K Harter	3	2
(Australia) C Doerner	6	6
(United Kingdom) C Molesworth	2	4
12	(United States) K May	6	6
(United States) J Anthony	6	6
(West Germany) I Riedel	2	1
(France) G Lovera	1	1
8	(Australia) K Reid	6	6

Third round
(Australia) C Doerner	0	2
12	(United States) K May	6	6
(United States) J Anthony	3	7
8	(Australia) K Reid	6	9

Fourth round
12	(United States) K May	2	1
8	(Australia) K Reid	6	6

==== Section 6 ====
First round
(United States) P Bostrom	3	4
(United States) L Antonoplis	6	6
WC	(Australia) S Saliba	1	5
WC	(United States) K Susman	6	7
(United States) C Meyer	1	5
(United States) A Kiyomura	6	7
(West Germany) H Masthoff	2	7	7
(Uruguay) F Bonicelli	6	5	5

Second round
(United States) L Antonoplis	7	6
Q	(Australia) C Matison	5	1
Q	(Denmark) H Sparre	6	6
WC	(United States) K Susman	3	2
(South Africa) I Kloss	3	4
(United States) A Kiyomura	6	6
(West Germany) H Masthoff	1	3
4	(United Kingdom) S Barker	6	6

Third round
(United States) L Antonoplis	6	6
Q	(Denmark) H Sparre	4	1
(United States) A Kiyomura	2	1
4	(United Kingdom) S Barker	6	6

Fourth round
(United States) L Antonoplis	0	4
4	(United Kingdom) S Barker	6	6

==== Section 7 ====
First round
(United States) S Walsh	4	2
(Australia) H Cawley	6	6
(United States) P Fordyce	6	7	1
(United States) J Stratton	4	9	6
(South Africa) B Cuypers	6	6
(Czechoslovakia) R Maršíková	0	4
(Italy) S Simmonds	3	1
7	(Netherlands) B Stöve	6	6

Second round
(Australia) H Cawley	6	6
WC	(United Kingdom) A Hobbs	4	3
(United States) J Stratton	7	9	6
LL	(Australia) C O'Neil	9	8	3
(Czechoslovakia) R Tomanová	6	2	6
(South Africa) B Cuypers	4	6	3
(United States) P Teeguarden	6	3	2
7	(Netherlands) B Stöve	3	6	6

Third round
(Australia) H Cawley	9	6
(United States) J Stratton	7	3
(Czechoslovakia) R Tomanová	1	2
7	(Netherlands) B Stöve	6	6

Fourth round
(Australia) H Cawley	4	2
7	(Netherlands) B Stöve	6	6

==== Section 8 ====
First round
(Belgium) M Gurdal	6	6
(United States) L duPont	2	4
(United States) T Holladay	6	6
(United Kingdom) L Beaven	3	3
(United Kingdom) L Charles	6	1	6
(France) B Simon	4	6	3
(United Kingdom) G Coles	3	0
2	(United States) M Navratilova	6	6

Second round
(Belgium) M Gurdal	6	6	3
(South Africa) A McDade	1	8	6
(United States) K Shaw	5	4
(United States) T Holladay	7	6
(Romania) F Mihai	2	4
(United Kingdom) L Charles	6	6
(Sweden) I Bentzer	0	3
2	(United States) M Navratilova	6	6

Third round
(South Africa) A McDade	4	0
(United States) T Holladay	6	6
(United Kingdom) L Charles	2	2
2	(United States) M Navratilova	6	6

Fourth round
(United States) T Holladay	4	4
2	(United States) M Navratilova	6	6

Preceded by 1977 French Open – Women's singles	Grand Slam women's singles	Succeeded by 1977 US Open – Women's singles
