= Kathy May =

American tennis player (born 1956)

- Full name: Kathy May Fritz
- Country (sports): United States
- Born: June 18, 1956 (age 70) Beverly Hills, California, USA
- Height: 5 ft 8 in (1.73 m)
- Plays: Right-handed

Singles
- Career record: 56–50
- Career titles: 7
- Highest ranking: No. 10 (July 3, 1977)

Grand Slam singles results
- French Open: QF (1977, 1978)
- Wimbledon: 4R (1977)
- US Open: QF (1978)

Doubles
- Career record: 36–49
- Career titles: 4

Grand Slam doubles results
- French Open: 2R (1977)
- Wimbledon: 3R (1974)
- US Open: QF (1978, 1979)

Kathy May Fritz (born June 18, 1956) is an American former professional tennis player. She reached three Grand Slam quarterfinals, once at the US Open in 1978 and twice at the French Open in 1977 and 1978. She won seven WTA singles titles during her career, and achieved a career-high ranking of world No. 10 in 1977.

She also competed under the names Kathy May Teacher after her marriage in 1979 to tennis player Brian Teacher, and Kathy May-Paben. Her son Taylor Fritz is also a professional tennis player, and he has reached the top 5 on the ATP Tour. She is also the Aunt of American real estate executive and civic official Brian Rosenstein.

== Early and personal life ==
May was born and grew up in Beverly Hills, California. She is the great-granddaughter of David May, founder of The May Department Stores Company (now Macy's).

In 1979, she married fellow Californian player Brian Teacher, also a top 10 tennis player and the 1980 Australian Open champion; they subsequently divorced. She married fireman Donn Paben in 1981 with whom she had two sons, and subsequently divorced. She later married Guy Fritz (brother of Harry Fritz), her third husband, and had her third son Taylor Fritz but she and Guy have since divorced.

== Tennis career ==
She reached three Grand Slam quarterfinals, once at the US Open in 1978 and twice at the French Open in 1977 and 1978. She won seven WTA singles titles during her career, and achieved a career-high ranking of world No. 10 in 1977.

She was coached by Tony Trabert.

== WTA Tour finals ==
=== Singles: 7 (7–0) ===
Winner - Legend Grand Slam tournaments (0–0) WTA Tour Championships (0–0) Virginia Slims, Avon, Other (7–0)	Titles by surface Hard (3–0) Grass (1–0) Clay (3–0) Carpet (0–0)

Outcome	No.	Date	Tournament	Surface	Opponent	Score
Winner	1.	September 17, 1973	Los Angeles	Hard	(United States) Lea Antonoplis	5–7, 6–1, 6–2
Winner	2.	April 22, 1974	Ojai Tennis Tournament	Hard	(United States) Susan Hagey	2–6, 6–0, 6–1
Winner	3.	May 6, 1974	Los Angeles	Hard	(United States) Lindsay Morse	6–4, 7–6
Winner	4.	August 19, 1974	Haverford	Grass	(United States) Barbara Jordan	6–3, 7–5
Winner	5.	March 17, 1975	Pensacola, Florida	Clay	(South Africa) Ilana Kloss	5–7, 6–4, 7–6
Winner	6.	January 19, 1976	Fort Myers, Florida	Clay	(United States) Ann Kiyomura	5–7, 6–3, 6–1
Winner	7.	September 8, 1976	Indianapolis	Clay	(South Africa) Brigitte Cuypers	6–4, 4–6, 6–2

=== Doubles: 7 (4–3) ===
Winner - Legend Grand Slam tournaments (0–0) WTA Tour Championships (0–0) Virginia Slims, Avon, Other (4–3)	Titles by surface Hard (3–2) Grass (0–0) Clay (1–1) Carpet (0–0)

Outcome	No.	Date	Tournament	Surface	Partner	Opponents	Score
Winner	1.	May 7, 1973	Los Angeles	Hard	(United States) Marita Redondo	(United States) Lindsay Morse (United States) Jean Nachand	6–4, 6–0
Winner	2.	September 17, 1973	Los Angeles	Hard	(United States) Marita Redondo	(United States) Laurie Tenney (United States) Robin Tenney	6–3, 7–5
Runner-up	1.	May 6, 1974	Los Angeles	Hard	(United States) Maricaye Christenson	(United States) Lea Antonoplis (United States) Susan Hagey	6–3, 6–4
Winner	3.	July 8, 1974	Raleigh, North Carolina	Clay	(United States) Rayni Fox	(United States) Lindsay Morse (United States) JoAnne Russell	5–7, 6–4, 6–2
Winner	4.	September 16, 1974	Los Angeles	Hard	(United States) Susan Hagey	(United States) Dodo Cheney (United States) Cynthia-Ann Thomas	6–2, 6–4
Runner-up	2.	August 18, 1975	South Orange	Clay	(United States) Kathleen Harter	(United States) Kristien Shaw (South Africa) Greer Stevens	w/o
Runner-up	3.	November 21, 1978	Tokyo	Hard (i)	(United States) Tracy Austin	(United States) Martina Navratilova (Netherlands) Betty Stöve	6–4, 6–7, 3–6

== Grand Slam singles tournament timeline ==
Key
W	F	SF	QF	#R	RR	Q#	DNQ	A	NH

(W) winner; (F) finalist; (SF) semifinalist; (QF) quarterfinalist; (#R) rounds 4, 3, 2, 1; (RR) round-robin stage; (Q#) qualification round; (DNQ) did not qualify; (A) absent; (NH) not held; (SR) strike rate (events won / competed); (W–L) win–loss record.

Tournament	1973	1974	1975	1976	1977		1978	1979	1980	Career SR
Australian Open	A	A	A	A	A	A	A	A	A	0 / 0
French Open	A	A	A	3R	QF		QF	2R	A	0 / 4
Wimbledon	A	2R	3R	2R	4R		3R	3R	2R	0 / 7
US Open	1R	A	3R	2R	1R		QF	4R	2R	0 / 7
SR	0 / 1	0 / 1	0 / 2	0 / 3	0 / 3		0 / 3	0 / 3	0 / 2	0 / 18
Year-end ranking			57	19	21		15	19	130	

- Note: The Australian Open was held twice in 1977, in January and December.

== See also ==
- List of female tennis players
