= Jeremy Cohen (tennis) =

American tennis player

- Full name: Jeremy Benjamin Cohen
- Country (sports): United States
- Born: February 13, 1955; Chicago, Illinois
- Died: January 15, 2004 (aged 48)

Singles
- Career record: 1–5
- Highest ranking: No. 293 (Dec 26, 1979)

Grand Slam singles results
- Australian Open: 1R (1979)
- Wimbledon: Q2 (1977)

Doubles
- Career record: 5–7

Jeremy Benjamin Cohen (February 13, 1955 – January 15, 2004) was an American professional tennis player.

Born and raised in Chicago, Cohen took up a tennis scholarship to Arizona State University and played on the varsity tennis from 1974 to 1977. After college he competed on the international tour and qualified for the main draw of the 1979 Australian Open, losing in the first round to Craig Miller. He was picked on the American team for the 1981 Maccabiah Games but an injury prevented him from taking part.

Cohen was a long-time resident of Scottsdale, Arizona, where he was a successful real estate broker.
