= Henry Bunis =

American tennis player

- Full name: Henry Johnston Bunis
- Country (sports): United States
- Born: March 27, 1953 (age 73) Cincinnati, Ohio
- Turned pro: 1975
- Retired: 1978

Singles
- Career record: 28–58
- Career titles: 0
- Highest ranking: No. 100 (August 24, 1976)

Grand Slam singles results
- French Open: 1R (1976, 1977)
- Wimbledon: 2R (1977)
- US Open: 2R (1976, 1977)

Doubles
- Career record: 16–44
- Career titles: 0

Grand Slam doubles results
- French Open: 2R (1976)
- Wimbledon: 1R (1977)
- US Open: 2R (1977)

Henry Bunis (born March 27, 1953) is a former professional tennis player from the United States.

== Biography ==
=== Early years and education ===
Born in Cincinnati, he is the oldest child of Alvin Bunis Sr. and Ann Bunis (née Johnston).

Bunis, winner of the Ohio high school state championship in 1971, was a two-time All American varsity tennis player at the Columbia University in New York, while he completed an arts history major.

=== Professional tennis ===
Following graduation in 1975, Bunis turned professional and spent four years on tour. He made the quarter-finals at Cologne in 1976, to match his best performance in a Grand Prix tournament, a quarter-final appearance in Cincinnati while at Columbia University in 1974. At a tournament in Little Rock in 1977 he managed to win a set against Björn Borg, in front of a crowd of 3,500 in Arkansas.

Bunis also made appearances at the French Open, Wimbledon and the US Open. He had three wins at Grand Slam level, to make the second round twice at the US Open and at the 1977 Wimbledon Championships, where he won a marathon 72 game match against Raz Reid.

His only final on the Grand Prix tour came in the doubles, when he and partner Paul McNamee were runners-up at the 1977 Chilean Open, .

=== Later life ===
When he retired from tennis in 1978 he began working with JP Morgan in New York and later completed a J.D. degree at New York Law School in June 1992, after which he worked for 20 years with real state company Archstone.

Bunis now lives in Cincinnati, Ohio and is married with two sons, Evan and Ryan.

== Grand Prix career finals ==
=== Doubles: 1 (0–1) ===
Result	W/L	Year	Tournament	Surface	Partner	Opponents	Score
Loss	1–0	Nov 1977	Santiago, Chile	Clay	(Australia) Paul McNamee	(Chile) Patricio Cornejo (Chile) Jaime Fillol	7–5, 1–6, 1–6
