= Scott Carnahan =

American tennis player

- Country (sports): United States
- Born: October 24, 1953 (age 72)

Singles
- Career record: 6–16
- Highest ranking: No. 193 (Dec 12, 1976)

Grand Slam singles results
- Australian Open: 1R (1977)
- Wimbledon: 1R (1977)

Doubles
- Career record: 10–37

Grand Slam doubles results
- Australian Open: 1R (1977)
- French Open: 1R (1980)
- Wimbledon: 2R (1977)
- US Open: 2R (1978)

Scott Carnahan (born October 24, 1953) is an American former professional tennis player.

One of the fastest servers of his era, Carnahan entered in national serving competitions and was once recorded at 137 mph at a Tennis magazine sponsored event in Los Angeles. He played collegiate tennis for UC Irvine, where he was a three-time singles All-American and the 1975 NCAA Division II doubles champion with Bob Wright. On the professional tour, he featured in all four grand slam tournaments during his career and ranked in the world's top 200 for singles.

== ATP Challenger finals ==
=== Doubles: 2 (0–2) ===
Result	No.	Date	Tournament	Surface	Partner	Opponents	Score
Loss	1.	Sep 1978	Tinton Falls, United States	Hard	(United States) Charles Strode	(United States) Keith Richardson (United States) John Sadri	7–6, 3–6, 4–6
Loss	2.	Nov 1978	Kyoto, Japan	Clay	(United States) Joel Bailey	(Australia) Ross Case (United States) Tony Graham	3–6, 4–6
