= 1977 Wimbledon Championships – Men's doubles =

Men's doubles
- 1977 Wimbledon Championships
- Final date: 1 July 1977
- 1976 Champions: (United States) Brian Gottfried (Mexico) Raúl Ramírez

Final
- Champions: (Australia) Ross Case (Australia) Geoff Masters
- Runners-up: (Australia) John Alexander (Australia) Phil Dent
- Score: 6–3, 6–4, 3–6, 8–9, 6–4

Details
- Draw: 64 (5 Q )
- Seeds: 8

Events
Singles	men	women		boys	girls
Doubles	men	women	mixed	boys	girls
← 1976 ·	Wimbledon Championships	· 1978 →

Brian Gottfried and Raúl Ramírez were the defending champions, but lost in the first round to Jim Delaney and Sashi Menon.

Ross Case and Geoff Masters defeated John Alexander and Phil Dent in the final, 6–3, 6–4, 3–6, 8–9, 6–4 to win the gentlemen's doubles title at the 1977 Wimbledon Championships. This was Ross and Masters' second Men's Doubles Grand Slam title (after the 1974 Australian Open), and also their last.

== Seeds ==
1. (United States) Brian Gottfried / (Mexico) Raúl Ramírez (first round)
2. (South Africa) Bob Hewitt / (South Africa) Frew McMillan (quarterfinals)
3. (United States) Bob Lutz / (United States) Stan Smith (third round)
4. (United States) Fred McNair / (United States) Sherwood Stewart (second round)
5. (Poland) Wojciech Fibak / (United States) Dick Stockton (quarterfinals)
6. (United States) Marty Riessen / (United States) Roscoe Tanner (quarterfinals)
7. (Australia) Ross Case / (Australia) Geoff Masters (champions)
8. (United States) Charlie Pasarell / (United States) Erik van Dillen (first round)

Click on the seed number of a player to go to their draw section.

== Draw ==
=== Key ===
- Q = Qualifier
- WC = Wild card
- LL = Lucky loser
- Alt = Alternate
- ITF = ITF entry
- PR = Protected ranking
- SR = Special ranking
- SE = Special exempt
- JE = Junior exempt
- JR = Junior Accelerator Programme entrant
- CO = College Accelerator Programme entrant
- NG = Next Gen Accelerator Program entrant
- w/o = Walkover
- r = Retired
- d = Defaulted

=== Finals ===
Quarterfinals
(Australia) Bob Carmichael (United States) Brian Teacher	6	6	9
5	(Poland) Wojciech Fibak (United States) Dick Stockton	4	4	7
(Australia) John Alexander (Australia) Phil Dent	6	6	6
(Australia) Syd Ball (Australia) Kim Warwick	4	4	2
6	(United States) Marty Riessen (United States) Roscoe Tanner	6	8	9	6	2
(United Kingdom) Mark Cox (South Africa) Cliff Drysdale	8	9	7	4	6
7	(Australia) Ross Case (Australia) Geoff Masters	6	9	5	7	8
2	(South Africa) Bob Hewitt (South Africa) Frew McMillan	2	8	7	9	6

Semifinals
(Australia) Bob Carmichael (United States) Brian Teacher	9	1	7	6	4
(Australia) John Alexander (Australia) Phil Dent	8	6	9	3	6
(United Kingdom) Mark Cox (South Africa) Cliff Drysdale	1	4	1
7	(Australia) Ross Case (Australia) Geoff Masters	6	6	6

Final
(Australia) John Alexander (Australia) Phil Dent	3	4	6	9	4
7	(Australia) Ross Case (Australia) Geoff Masters	6	6	3	8	6

=== Top half ===
==== Section 1 ====
First round
1	(United States) B Gottfried (Mexico) R Ramírez	6	5	8	2	3
(United States) J Delaney (India) S Menon	3	7	6	6	6
(United States) V Amaya (United States) J Hagey	6	6	9
LL	(United Kingdom) M Appleton (United Kingdom) J Dier	3	4	7
(Australia) R Crealy (Czechoslovakia) J Kodeš	9	8	9	8	6
(United States) V Gerulaitis (United States) A Mayer	8	9	7	9	3
(United States) R Fisher (United States) J McManus	1	2	4
(Australia) R Carmichael (United States) B Teacher	6	6	6
(United States) R Bohrnstedt (United States) M Machette	6	6	6
LL	(United States) H Bunis (United States) G Seewagen	3	4	3
Q	(Australia) D Collings (Australia) G Hutchinson	7	8	4	5
(India) An Amritraj (India) V Amritraj	5	9	6	7
Q	(Australia) R Keighery (Australia) W Maher	5	2	4
Q	(Argentina) JL Clerc (Ecuador) R Ycaza	7	6	6
(Venezuela) J Andrew (Bolivia) R Benavides	2	1	2
5	(Poland) W Fibak (United States) R Stockton	6	6	6

Second round
(United States) J Delaney (India) S Menon	7	8	3
(United States) V Amaya (United States) J Hagey	9	9	6
(Australia) R Crealy (Czechoslovakia) J Kodeš	6	3	4	5
(Australia) R Carmichael (United States) B Teacher	2	6	6	7
(United States) R Bohrnstedt (United States) M Machette	1	6	9	6
(India) An Amritraj (India) V Amritraj	6	3	8	3
Q	(Argentina) JL Clerc (Ecuador) R Ycaza	6	6	3	4	3
5	(Poland) W Fibak (United States) R Stockton	2	2	6	6	6

Third round
(United States) V Amaya (United States) J Hagey	9	5	4	4
(Australia) R Carmichael (United States) B Teacher	7	7	6	6
(United States) R Bohrnstedt (United States) M Machette	2	6	6	4
5	(Poland) W Fibak (United States) R Stockton	6	8	3	6

Quarterfinals
(Australia) R Carmichael (United States) B Teacher	6	6	9
5	(Poland) W Fibak (United States) R Stockton	4	4	7

==== Section 2 ====
First round
3	(United States) R Lutz (United States) S Smith	2	7	6	6
(United States) Ti Gullikson (United States) To Gullikson	6	5	3	3
(United States) P Fleming (United States) E Mayer	6	8	3	2
Q	(United States) S Carnahan (United Kingdom) M Wayman	4	9	6	6
(Australia) J Alexander (Australia) P Dent	6	6	6
(India) C Mukerjea (India) B Nunna	3	0	2
(Australia) R Ruffels (Australia) A Stone	7	6	6
(South Africa) W Prinsloo (South Africa) D Schneider	5	4	0
(United Kingdom) C Bradnam (United Kingdom) A Jarrett	6	4	9	2
(Chile) H Gildemeister (Chile) B Prajoux	8	6	7	6
(Australia) C Dibley (United States) M Estep	9	6	6
(United States) T Gorman (United States) D Ralston	8	3	4
LL	(India) As Amritraj (Australia) A Gardiner	2	7	6	1
(Australia) P Kronk (Australia) C Letcher	6	9	3	6
(Australia) S Ball (Australia) K Warwick	6	6	6
8	(United States) C Pasarell (United States) E van Dillen	3	3	4

Second round
3	(United States) R Lutz (United States) S Smith	6	6	8	6
Q	(United States) S Carnahan (United Kingdom) M Wayman	4	4	9	0
(Australia) J Alexander (Australia) P Dent	4	4	6	6	6
(Australia) R Ruffels (Australia) A Stone	6	6	3	4	4
(Chile) H Gildemeister (Chile) B Prajoux	7	8	8
(Australia) C Dibley (United States) M Estep	9	9	9
(Australia) P Kronk (Australia) C Letcher	4	6	4	3
(Australia) S Ball (Australia) K Warwick	6	3	6	6

Third round
3	(United States) R Lutz (United States) S Smith	6	4	6	3
(Australia) J Alexander (Australia) P Dent	3	6	8	6
(Australia) C Dibley (United States) M Estep	2	4	6	3
(Australia) S Ball (Australia) K Warwick	6	6	4	6

Quarterfinals
(Australia) J Alexander (Australia) P Dent	6	6	6
(Australia) S Ball (Australia) K Warwick	4	4	2

=== Bottom half ===
==== Section 3 ====
First round
6	(United States) M Riessen (United States) R Tanner	3	6	8	6	6
(Australia) R Laver (Australia) J Newcombe	6	0	9	2	2
(United Kingdom) R Beven (United Kingdom) N Sears	0	6	3
LL	(Australia) E Ewert (Australia) J Trickey	6	8	6
(Egypt) I El Shafei (New Zealand) B Fairlie	6	6	6
Q	(Australia) R Frawley (Australia) G Thomson	4	4	4
(United States) H Pfister (United States) K Walts	7	6	6
(United Kingdom) C Kaskow (United Kingdom) A Lloyd	5	4	3
(France) G Moretton (France) Y Noah	7	3	8	3
(United Kingdom) M Cox (South Africa) C Drysdale	5	6	9	6
(Rhodesia) C Dowdeswell (Australia) C Kachel	6	6	6
(United States) E Friedler (United States) J Karzen	3	2	1
LL	(Australia) P Campbell (United States) J Holladay	6	6	9
(New Zealand) C Lewis (New Zealand) R Simpson	3	4	8
LL	(New Zealand) P Langsford (Finland) L Palin	6	6	3	6	6
4	(United States) F McNair (United States) S Stewart	8	1	6	2	8

Second round
6	(United States) M Riessen (United States) R Tanner	9	6	6
LL	(Australia) E Ewert (Australia) J Trickey	8	4	4
(Egypt) I El Shafei (New Zealand) B Fairlie	6	6	9
(United States) H Pfister (United States) K Walts	4	4	8
(United Kingdom) M Cox (South Africa) C Drysdale	8	9	6
(Rhodesia) C Dowdeswell (Australia) C Kachel	6	8	4
LL	(Australia) P Campbell (United States) J Holladay	6	2	3	6	6
4	(United States) F McNair (United States) S Stewart	4	6	6	3	4

Third round
6	(United States) M Riessen (United States) R Tanner	6	6	4	6	6
(Egypt) I El Shafei (New Zealand) B Fairlie	3	8	6	4	3
(United Kingdom) M Cox (South Africa) C Drysdale	6	6	6
LL	(Australia) P Campbell (United States) J Holladay	2	4	2

Quarterfinals
6	(United States) M Riessen (United States) R Tanner	6	8	9	6	2
(United Kingdom) M Cox (South Africa) C Drysdale	8	9	7	4	6

==== Section 4 ====
First round
7	(Australia) R Case (Australia) G Masters	6	6	6
(Chile) Á Fillol (Chile) J Fillol	3	4	4
(Mexico) E Montaño (South Africa) J Yuill	2	4	4
(South Africa) B Bertram (South Africa) B Mitton	6	6	6
(Australia) M Edmondson (Australia) J Marks	6	6	6
(Brazil) JE Mandarino (Argentina) M Vázquez	2	1	2
(United States) W Martin (New Zealand) O Parun	7	6	6	6
(United Kingdom) J Feaver (United Kingdom) R Taylor	9	2	4	2
(Australia) W Bowrey (Australia) N Fraser	3	6	4	2
(United Kingdom) R Drysdale (United Kingdom) R Lewis	6	3	6	6
(United States) J Borowiak (United States) A Pattison	6	7	6
LL	(West Germany) U Marten (West Germany) R Probst	3	5	4
(Colombia) Á Betancur (South Africa) D Joubert	1	3	2
(United Kingdom) D Lloyd (United Kingdom) J Lloyd	6	6	6
(South Africa) R Moore (United States) W Scanlon	5	1	4
2	(South Africa) R Hewitt (South Africa) F McMillan	7	6	6

Second round
7	(Australia) R Case (Australia) G Masters	7	6	6	8	6
(South Africa) B Bertram (South Africa) B Mitton	5	4	8	9	2
(Australia) M Edmondson (Australia) J Marks	6	3	6	6	15
(United States) W Martin (New Zealand) O Parun	3	6	3	8	17
(United Kingdom) R Drysdale (United Kingdom) R Lewis	6	3	4	7
(United States) J Borowiak (United States) A Pattison	3	6	6	9
(United Kingdom) D Lloyd (United Kingdom) J Lloyd	3	2	4
2	(South Africa) R Hewitt (South Africa) F McMillan	6	6	6

Third round
7	(Australia) R Case (Australia) G Masters	4	9	6	4	9
(United States) W Martin (New Zealand) O Parun	6	7	3	6	7
(United States) J Borowiak (United States) A Pattison	4	4	4
2	(South Africa) R Hewitt (South Africa) F McMillan	6	6	6

Quarterfinals
7	(Australia) R Case (Australia) G Masters	6	9	5	7	8
2	(South Africa) R Hewitt (South Africa) F McMillan	2	8	7	9	6
