= Noel Callaghan =

Australian tennis coach and former player

- Country (sports): Australia
- Born: 16 May 1955 (age 69); New South Wales
- Official website: noelcallaghantennis.com

Singles
- Career record: 0–1

Grand Slam singles results
- Wimbledon: Q3 (1976, 1977)

Doubles
- Career record: 0–3

Grand Slam doubles results
- Wimbledon: 1R (1978)

Grand Slam mixed doubles results
- Wimbledon: 3R (1976)

Noel Callaghan (born 16 May 1955) is an Australian tennis coach and former professional player.

Callaghan, raised in Sydney, was a top-ranked junior in New South Wales and trained with Charlie Hollis, who also coached Rod Laver. He toured professionally for 10 years and during the 1970s he competed on the European circuit. He competed at the Wimbledon Championships five times whereby both Noel and fellow Aussie Jenny Walker made the round of 16 in 1976, losing a tight 3 setter on Centre Court.

A former New South Wales state coach, Callaghan has coached many professional players, including Brad Drewett, Wally Masur, Jelena Dokic, and Samantha Stosur.
