= Michael Appleton (tennis) =

British tennis player

- Country (sports): Great Britain
- Born: Lancashire, England
- Plays: Right-handed

Singles

Grand Slam singles results
- Wimbledon: Q2 (1978, 1981)

Doubles
- Career record: 0–5

Grand Slam doubles results
- Wimbledon: 1R (1977, 1978, 1980, 1981)

Grand Slam mixed doubles results
- Wimbledon: 1R (1979)

Michael Appleton is a British former professional tennis player.

Appleton, a Lancashire county player, was a top ranked British junior. His junior career included a win over Ivan Lendl at a tournament in Mexico. He made four doubles main draw appearances at the Wimbledon Championships during the 1970s and 1980s. His daughter Emily is a professional tennis player.
