= John Holladay (tennis) =

American tennis player

- Country (sports): United States
- Born: February 24, 1954 (age 71)

Singles
- Highest ranking: No. 92 (June 2, 1975)

Grand Slam singles results
- Wimbledon: 1R (1975, 1976, 1977)

Doubles

Grand Slam doubles results
- Australian Open: 1R (1977^{Jan})
- Wimbledon: 3R (1977)
- US Open: 1R (1973, 1977)

John Holladay (born February 24, 1954) is an American former professional tennis player.

Born in 1954, Holladay attended La Jolla High School and played in the school tennis team which included future professional players Raúl Ramírez, Chico Hagey and Steve Mott. He went on to play collegiate tennis for the USC Trojans.

Holladay, brother of WTA Tour player Terry, had a best singles ranking of 92 on the professional tour and qualified for the main draw at Wimbledon three years in a row, from 1975 to 1977. He lost in the first round on each occasion but made the third round of the doubles at the 1977 Wimbledon Championships, partnering Australian Peter Campbell, which included a win over French Open champions Fred McNair and Sherwood Stewart.
