= Aleida Spex =

Cuban-American tennis player

- Country (sports): Cuba; United States
- Born: June 16, 1955 (age 69)

Singles

Grand Slam singles results
- Wimbledon: 3R (1976)
- US Open: Q3 (1981)

Doubles

Grand Slam doubles results
- US Open: 1R (1976)
Medal record
Representing Cuba
Central American and Caribbean Games
Gold medal – first place	1974 Santo Domingo	Mixed doubles
Silver medal – second place	1974 Santo Domingo	Women's singles
Bronze medal – third place	1974 Santo Domingo	Women's doubles

Aleida Spex (born June 16, 1955) is a Cuban-American former professional tennis player.

Born in Cuba, Spex defected while competing at the 1974 Central American and Caribbean Games in Santo Domingo, where she won three medals for her native country. She initially sought refuge in the Embassy of Chile, but ended up in the United States.

Spex settled in Miami and was able to secure sponsorship to enable her to play on the professional tour. She twice qualified for the main draw of the Wimbledon Championships, including in 1976 when she made it through to the third round, with wins over Christina Sandberg and Isabel Fernández.
