= Peter Campbell (tennis) =

Australian tennis player

- Country (sports): Australia
- Born: 10 November 1950 (age 75) Melbourne, Victoria

Singles
- Career record: 4–21
- Highest ranking: No. 179 (3 Jan 1979)

Grand Slam singles results
- Australian Open: 1R (1976, 1977^{(Jan)}, 1977^{(Dec)}, 1978)
- Wimbledon: Q3 (1975)

Doubles
- Career record: 10–19

Grand Slam doubles results
- Australian Open: 2R (1979)
- Wimbledon: 3R (1977)
- US Open: 1R (1979)

Peter Campbell (born 10 November 1950) is an Australian former professional tennis player. He was previously a women's coach at the Australian Institute of Sport in Canberra.

A native of Melbourne, Campbell played collegiate tennis for UC Berkeley during the early 1970s. He spent the rest of the decade on the professional tour. In 1975 he pushed Ken Rosewall to three sets at the NSW Open and in 1977 he teamed up with John Holladay to make the doubles third round at Wimbledon.

== ATP Challenger finals ==
=== Doubles: 1 (0–1) ===
Result	No.	Date	Tournament	Surface	Partner	Opponents	Score
Loss	1.	Jan 1978	Hobart, Australia	Hard	(Australia) Greg Braun	(Australia) Chris Kachel (Australia) John Marks	1–6, 4–6
