= Susan Hagey =

American tennis player

Susan Hagey Wall
- Full name: Susan Hagey Wall
- Country (sports): United States
- Plays: Right-handed

Grand Slam singles results
- Wimbledon: 2R (1977)

Grand Slam doubles results
- US Open: 1R (1978)

Grand Slam mixed doubles results
- Wimbledon: QF (1974)
- US Open: 1R (1974)

Susan Hagey Wall is an American former professional tennis player. She was Stanford University's first four-time All-American in women's tennis (1976-1979), a two-time AIAW national doubles champion, and helped lead Stanford to its first women's national championship in 1978. Internationally, she reached the mixed doubles quarterfinals at the 1974 Wimbledon Championships, the girls' quarterfinals at the 1975 Wimbledon Championships, won two gold medals representing the United States at the 1979 Pan American Games, and captured the singles title at the 1982 New Zealand Open. In 2019, she was inducted into the Stanford Athletics Hall of Fame. (Note: As of 2026, both the WTA and ITF websites list Hagey's nationality during her career as Belgian, but contemporary sources only mention her as an American. Her given birthdate is in 1952, yet she played Wimbledon juniors in 1975, so it is likely her record has been mixed up with another player.)

== Biography ==
Hagey grew up in La Jolla, California, one of eight children in a family with a distinguished tennis tradition. Her father, Robert Hagey, was a nationally ranked tennis player. Her brother, Chico Hagey, was a two-time All-American at Stanford University before competing professionally on the Association of Tennis Professionals tour. Her sister, Cari Hagey, was also an All-American at Stanford and helped lead the Cardinal to NCAA team championships in 1986 and 1987.

== Stanford ==
Hagey attended Stanford University, where she became the first four-time All-American in the history of the women's tennis program, earning the honor each year from 1976 through 1979. Partnering with Diane Morrison, Hagey won consecutive AIAW national doubles championships in 1975 and 1976. The pair reached the national doubles championship finals again in 1978 before losing to Stanford teammates Barbara Jordan and Kathy Jordan.

Hagey helped lead the Cardinal to three consecutive runner-up finishes in the AIAW team championships before capturing the program's first national championship with the 1978 AIAW title, laying the foundation for what would become one of the most successful women's tennis programs in collegiate history.

Hagey was inducted into the Stanford Athletics Hall of Fame in 2019 in recognition of her accomplishments as one of the pioneering players in the history of the Cardinal women's tennis program.

== International Career ==
In 1974, at age 16, Hagey partnered with Raúl Ramírez in the mixed doubles competition at the 1974 Wimbledon Championships. The pair reached the quarterfinals after defeating the Czechoslovak pairing of Jan Kodeš and Martina Navratilova before losing to eventual champions Billie Jean King and Owen Davidson on Centre Court. At the 1975 Wimbledon Championships Hagey advanced to the quarterfinals of the Junior Wimbledon singles event, where she lost to Greer Stevens. She returned to Wimbledon in 1977 after qualifying for the ladies' singles main draw.

In 1979, Hagey represented the United States at the 1979 Pan American Games in San Juan, Puerto Rico. Hagey won the gold medal in women's singles and teamed with Ann Henricksson to win a second gold medal in women's doubles.

In 1982, Hagey captured the singles title at the New Zealand Open, defeating New Zealand's Belinda Cordwell in the final.

== Olympic Service ==
From 1980 through 1988, Hagey served on the United States Olympic Committee's Athletes Advisory Council as the tennis representative. In 1985, she represented the United States at the International Olympic Academy in Greece.

== Personal life ==
Hagey married attorney Joe Wall, a Stanford University graduate in the Class of 1981. They have six children together.
