= 1977 Wimbledon Championships – Girls' singles =

Girls' singles
- 1977 Wimbledon Championships

Final
- Champion: (United States) Lea Antonoplis
- Runner-up: (United States) Peanut Louie
- Score: 7–5, 6–1

Events
Singles	men	women		boys	girls
Doubles	men	women	mixed	boys	girls
← 1976 ·	Wimbledon Championships	· 1978 →

Lea Antonoplis defeated Peanut Louie in the final, 7–5, 6–1 to win the girls' singles tennis title at the 1977 Wimbledon Championships.

== Seeds ==
1. (United States) Anne Smith (semifinals)
2. (Czechoslovakia) Hana Strachoňová (third round)
3. (United States) Peanut Louie (final)
4. (Argentina) Claudia Casabianca (quarterfinals)

Click on the seed number of a player to go to their draw section.

== Draw ==
=== Key ===
- Q = Qualifier
- WC = Wild card
- LL = Lucky loser
- Alt = Alternate
- SE = Special exempt
- PR = Protected ranking
- ITF = ITF entry
- JE = Junior exempt
- w/o = Walkover
- r = Retired
- d = Defaulted
- SR = Special ranking

=== Finals ===
Quarterfinals
1	(United States) Anne Smith	6	7
(United Kingdom) Jo Durie	0	5
4	(Argentina) Claudia Casabianca	2	2
(United States) Lea Antonoplis	6	6
(Mexico) A Vellejo	0	0
3	(United States) Peanut Louie	6	6
(West Germany) Sylvia Hanika	6	6
(United Kingdom) Clare Harrison	2	4

Semifinals
1	(United States) Anne Smith	6	4	3
(United States) Lea Antonoplis	2	6	6
3	(United States) Peanut Louie	4	6	6
(West Germany) Sylvia Hanika	6	3	2

Final
(United States) Lea Antonoplis	7	6
3	(United States) Peanut Louie	5	1

=== Top half ===
==== Section 1 ====
First round

Second round
1	(United States) Anne Smith	6	6
(South Africa) Rosalyn Fairbank	1	0
(Belgium) M Decrop	4	1
(Canada) N Marois	6	6
(Italy) Sabina Simmonds	6	6
(Australia) Kerryn Pratt	1	3
(India) Amreeta Ahluwalia	2	1
(United Kingdom) Jo Durie	6	6

Third round
1	(United States) A Smith	6	6
(Canada) N Marois	2	1
(Italy) S Simmonds	4	2
(United Kingdom) J Durie	6	6

Quarterfinals
1	(United States) A Smith	6	7
(United Kingdom) J Durie	0	5

==== Section 2 ====
First round
(Sweden) Helene Brywe	6	6
(Austria) P Halat	3	1

Second round
4	(Argentina) Claudia Casabianca	6	6
(Singapore) Caroline Young	1	1
(New Zealand) LM Harris	5	1
(Romania) Lucia Romanov	7	6
(Czechoslovakia) Hana Mandlíková	2	3
(Switzerland) Petra Delhees	6	6
(United States) Lea Antonoplis	6	6
(Sweden) H Brywe	3	2

Third round
4	(Argentina) C Casabianca	6	8
(Romania) L Romanov	2	6
(Switzerland) P Delhees	0	4
(United States) L Antonoplis	6	6

Quarterfinals
4	(Argentina) C Casabianca	2	2
(United States) L Antonoplis	6	6

=== Bottom half ===
==== Section 3 ====
First round
(Mexico) A Vellejo	6	6
(Denmark) P Arildsen	3	2

Second round
(Mexico) A Vellejo	6	4	7
(United Kingdom) Anne Hobbs	4	6	5
(Jamaica) M Harris	0	2
(Poland) M Sierocka	6	6
(Argentina) Ivanna Madruga	6	3	6
(France) Martine Bureau	2	6	3
(Norway) E Torkildsen	2	1
3	(United States) Peanut Louie	6	6

Third round
(Mexico) A Vellejo	6	6
(Poland) M Sierocka	2	2
(Argentina) I Madruga	9	4	4
3	(United States) M Louie	8	6	6

Quarterfinals
(Mexico) A Vellejo	0	0
3	(United States) M Louie	6	6

==== Section 4 ====
First round

Second round
(Italy) Manuela Zoni	2	1
(West Germany) Sylvia Hanika	6	6
(Australia) Amanda Tobin	5	6	6
(Rhodesia) Sally-Ann Lewis	7	0	3
(United Kingdom) Clare Harrison	6	6
(Ghana) Victoria Dowuona	1	1
(Netherlands) I Korsten	6	2
2	(Czechoslovakia) Hana Strachoňová	8	6

Third round
(West Germany) S Hanika	6	8
(Australia) A Tobin	1	6
(United Kingdom) C Harrison	6	5	6
2	(Czechoslovakia) H Strachoňová	4	7	2

Quarterfinals
(West Germany) S Hanika	6	6
(United Kingdom) C Harrison	2	4
