= 1977 Wimbledon Championships – Men's singles =

Men's singles
- 1977 Wimbledon Championships
- Final date: 2 July 1977
- 1976 Champion: (Sweden) Björn Borg

Final
- Champion: (Sweden) Björn Borg
- Runner-up: (United States) Jimmy Connors
- Score: 3–6, 6–2, 6–1, 5–7, 6–4

Details
- Draw: 128 (16 Q / 8 WC )
- Seeds: 16

Events
Singles	men	women		boys	girls
Doubles	men	women	mixed	boys	girls
← 1976 ·	Wimbledon Championships	· 1978 →

Defending champion Björn Borg defeated Jimmy Connors in the final, 3–6, 6–2, 6–1, 5–7, 6–4 to win the gentlemen's singles tennis title at the 1977 Wimbledon Championships. It was his second Wimbledon title and fourth major title overall.

This marked the first Wimbledon singles appearance of future three-time champion John McEnroe, who entered as a qualifier and reached the semifinals before losing to Connors. It was also the final major appearance of four-time Wimbledon champion and eleven-time Grand Slam tournament champion Rod Laver.

== Seeds ==
1. (United States) Jimmy Connors (final)
2. (Sweden) Björn Borg (champion)
3. (Argentina) Guillermo Vilas (third round)
4. (United States) Roscoe Tanner (first round)
5. (United States) Brian Gottfried (second round)
6. (Romania) Ilie Năstase (quarterfinals)
7. (Mexico) Raúl Ramírez (second round)
8. (United States) Vitas Gerulaitis (semifinals)
9. (United States) Dick Stockton (fourth round)
10. (Italy) Adriano Panatta (second round)
11. (United States) Stan Smith (fourth round)
12. (Poland) Wojciech Fibak (fourth round)
13. (Australia) Phil Dent (quarterfinals)
14. (United Kingdom) Mark Cox (fourth round)
15. (United States) Bob Lutz (third round)
16. (United States) Harold Solomon (first round)

Click on the seed number of a player to go to their draw section.

== Draw ==
=== Key ===
- Q = Qualifier
- WC = Wild card
- LL = Lucky loser
- Alt = Alternate
- ITF = ITF entry
- PR = Protected ranking
- SR = Special ranking
- SE = Special exempt
- JE = Junior exempt
- JR = Junior Accelerator Programme entrant
- CO = College Accelerator Programme entrant
- NG = Next Gen Accelerator Program entrant
- w/o = Walkover
- r = Retired
- d = Defaulted

=== Finals ===
Quarterfinals
1	(United States) Jimmy Connors	6	3	6	6
(South Africa) Byron Bertram	4	6	4	2
Q	(United States) John McEnroe	6	8	4	6	6
13	(Australia) Phil Dent	4	9	6	3	4
8	(United States) Vitas Gerulaitis	6	8	6	6
(United States) Billy Martin	2	9	2	2
6	(Romania) Ilie Năstase	0	6	3
2	(Sweden) Björn Borg	6	8	6

Semifinals
1	(United States) Jimmy Connors	6	6	4	6
Q	(United States) John McEnroe	3	3	6	4
8	(United States) Vitas Gerulaitis	4	6	3	6	6
2	(Sweden) Björn Borg	6	3	6	3	8

Final
1	(United States) Jimmy Connors	6	2	1	7	4
2	(Sweden) Björn Borg	3	6	6	5	6

=== Top half ===
==== Section 1 ====
First round
1	(United States) Jimmy Connors	6	6	6
(United Kingdom) Richard Lewis	3	2	4
(United States) Marty Riessen	6	1	8	6
(New Zealand) Chris Lewis	3	6	6	1
(United States) Jeff Borowiak	9	3	5	2
(South Africa) Cliff Drysdale	8	6	7	6
Q	(Czechoslovakia) Jiří Granát	3	3	6	9	2
(United States) Mike Estep	6	6	4	7	6
(United States) Bill Scanlon	3	5	5
Q	(New Zealand) Russell Simpson	6	7	7
(New Zealand) Onny Parun	8	7	9
LL	(United States) Butch Seewagen	6	5	8
(United States) Charlie Pasarell	6	6	6
(United States) Brian Teacher	2	1	4
(Australia) Dick Crealy	4	2	2
11	(United States) Stan Smith	6	6	6

Second round
1	(United States) J Connors	6	8	6	8
(United States) M Riessen	4	9	1	6
(South Africa) C Drysdale	6	6	6
(United States) M Estep	3	4	3
Q	(New Zealand) R Simpson	8	3	4
(New Zealand) O Parun	9	6	6
(United States) C Pasarell	4	3	5
11	(United States) S Smith	6	6	7

Third round
1	(United States) J Connors	6	7	6
(South Africa) C Drysdale	2	5	4
(New Zealand) O Parun	3	7	8	5
11	(United States) S Smith	6	5	9	7

Fourth round
1	(United States) J Connors	7	6	3	6	6
11	(United States) S Smith	9	2	6	3	3

==== Section 2 ====
First round
15	(United States) Bob Lutz	6	6	6
(South Africa) Bernard Mitton	3	4	3
(United States) Trey Waltke	7	4	2	8
WC	(United States) Dennis Ralston	5	6	6	9
WC	(United Kingdom) David Lloyd	6	3	6	3	6
Q	(Ecuador) Ricardo Ycaza	4	6	3	6	4
(Australia) Kim Warwick	6	6	6
(Australia) Geoff Masters	2	2	3
(Australia) Paul Kronk	7	6	3	1	6
(United States) James Delaney	5	3	6	6	4
(West Germany) Frank Gebert	3	4	1
Q	(Sweden) Douglas Palm	6	6	6
(Australia) Colin Dibley	4	6	6	3	2
(South Africa) Byron Bertram	6	3	2	6	6
(Bolivia) Ramiro Benavides	3	4	4
5	(United States) Brian Gottfried	6	6	6

Second round
15	(United States) R Lutz	5	6	7	6
WC	(United States) D Ralston	7	3	5	2
WC	(United Kingdom) D Lloyd	6	1	4
(Australia) K Warwick	8	6	6
(Australia) P Kronk	5	6	6	6	6
Q	(Sweden) D Palm	7	4	8	3	1
(South Africa) B Bertram	6	4	6	6
5	(United States) B Gottfried	2	6	4	3

Third round
15	(United States) R Lutz	4	6	4	6	6
(Australia) K Warwick	6	3	6	2	8
(Australia) P Kronk	4	0	2
(South Africa) B Bertram	6	6	6

Fourth round
(Australia) K Warwick	3	2	5
(South Africa) B Bertram	6	6	7

==== Section 3 ====
First round
4	(United States) Roscoe Tanner	6	4	4	6
(United Kingdom) John Lloyd	3	6	6	8
(West Germany) Karl Meiler	7	4	6	7
(South Africa) Bob Hewitt	5	6	1	5
(United Kingdom) John Feaver	1	6	6	1	3
(Rhodesia) Colin Dowdeswell	6	2	2	6	6
Q	(United States) John McEnroe	6	7	6
(Egypt) Ismail El Shafei	0	5	4
(United States) Butch Walts	6	9	5	8	8
Q	(Australia) John Marks	4	8	7	9	6
(Venezuela) John Andrew	6	6	6
LL	(United States) Scott Carnahan	4	2	4
(United States) Sandy Mayer	6	3	6	8	7
(South Africa) Deon Joubert	2	6	2	9	5
(United States) Erik van Dillen	4	8	6	3
10	(Italy) Adriano Panatta	6	9	4	6

Second round
(United Kingdom) J Lloyd	6	6	2	4	7
(West Germany) K Meiler	2	3	6	6	9
(Rhodesia) C Dowdeswell	7	3	1
Q	(United States) J McEnroe	9	6	6
(United States) K Walts	2	6	4
(Venezuela) J Andrew	6	8	6
(United States) A Mayer	8	6	6	6
10	(Italy) A Panatta	9	0	2	4

Third round
(West Germany) K Meiler	2	2	7	3
Q	(United States) J McEnroe	6	6	5	6
(Venezuela) J Andrew	4	7	4
(United States) A Mayer	6	9	6

Fourth round
Q	(United States) J McEnroe	7	4	6	6
(United States) A Mayer	5	6	3	1

==== Section 4 ====
First round
13	(Australia) Phil Dent	6	6	6
LL	(United States) William Lofgren	1	2	2
LL	(Brazil) José Edison Mandarino	5	1	2
LL	(India) Anand Amritraj	7	6	6
WC	(United Kingdom) Andrew Jarrett	3	3	4
(South Africa) Ray Moore	6	6	6
(Argentina) Lito Álvarez	6	4	6	6
Q	(Netherlands) Rolf Thung	4	6	3	3
(New Zealand) Brian Fairlie	8	7	8	6
(United States) Victor Amaya	9	5	6	4
(United States) Mike Machette	6	3	8	3
LL	(Australia) Bob Carmichael	4	6	9	6
(United States) Tim Gullikson	6	6	6
(United States) Steve Krulevitz	2	4	3
(United States) Peter Fleming	4	6	2	3
7	(Mexico) Raúl Ramírez	6	3	6	6

Second round
13	(Australia) P Dent	2	9	6	4	6
LL	(India) A Amritraj	6	8	3	6	4
(South Africa) R Moore	6	6	6
(Argentina) E Álvarez	4	4	3
(New Zealand) B Fairlie	8	4	6	6
LL	(Australia) R Carmichael	6	6	4	3
(United States) Ti Gullikson	6	6	3	8	6
7	(Mexico) R Ramírez	3	4	6	9	4

Third round
13	(Australia) P Dent	8	3	6	7
(South Africa) R Moore	6	6	4	5
(New Zealand) B Fairlie	8	3	9	3
(United States) Ti Gullikson	9	6	8	6

Fourth round
13	(Australia) P Dent	6	3	9	1	9
(United States) Ti Gullikson	3	6	8	6	7

=== Bottom half ===
==== Section 5 ====
First round
8	(United States) Vitas Gerulaitis	6	9	6
(United States) Tom Gorman	1	8	3
(United States) Gene Mayer	6	6	6
Q	(United States) John Holladay	4	2	4
WC	(United Kingdom) Jonathan Smith	6	6	6
(South Africa) Willem Prinsloo	4	4	2
Q	(United States) Henry Bunis	8	6	6	9	8
Q	(United States) Raz Reid	9	4	8	8	6
(Chile) Hans Gildemeister	4	6	6	6	6
(Chile) Belus Prajoux	6	4	8	4	3
(United States) Fred McNair	6	4	6	8	16
(United States) Nick Saviano	3	6	3	9	14
Q	(Republic of Ireland) Sean Sorensen	0	2	2
(Australia) Rod Laver	6	6	6
WC	(United Kingdom) Robin Drysdale	3	8	3
9	(United States) Dick Stockton	6	9	6

Second round
8	(United States) V Gerulaitis	6	6	6
(United States) E Mayer	3	1	1
WC	(United Kingdom) J Smith	6	7	1	6
Q	(United States) H Bunis	3	5	6	4
(Chile) H Gildemeister	3	8	2	5
(United States) F McNair	6	6	6	7
(Australia) R Laver	6	7	4	5
9	(United States) R Stockton	3	9	6	7

Third round
8	(United States) V Gerulaitis	6	8	6
WC	(United Kingdom) J Smith	3	6	4
(United States) F McNair	4	3	2
9	(United States) R Stockton	6	6	6

Fourth round
8	(United States) V Gerulaitis	6	6	3	6
9	(United States) R Stockton	1	4	6	4

==== Section 6 ====
First round
14	(United Kingdom) Mark Cox	6	7	8
LL	(South Africa) Rory Chappell	4	5	6
(Australia) John Alexander	6	6	6
WC	(United Kingdom) Tony Lloyd	3	4	2
(United States) Dick Bohrnstedt	8	9	6	6
Q	(Australia) Alvin Gardiner	9	8	1	4
WC	(France) Patrice Dominguez	6	4	6	6
(India) Sashi Menon	4	6	2	4
(United States) Billy Martin	6	6	6
(South Africa) David Schneider	4	4	1
(Australia) Ray Ruffels	7	8	2	9
(United Kingdom) Roger Taylor	5	6	6	7
(South Africa) John Yuill	6	6	6
(Colombia) Álvaro Betancur	3	4	3
(Czechoslovakia) Jan Kodeš	8	5	4
3	(Argentina) Guillermo Vilas	9	7	6

Second round
14	(United Kingdom) M Cox	8	6	7
(Australia) J Alexander	6	4	5
(United States) R Bohrnstedt	2	8	3
WC	(France) P Dominguez	6	9	6
(United States) W Martin	3	2	9	6	10
(Australia) R Ruffels	6	6	8	2	8
(South Africa) J Yuill	3	2	6	6
3	(Argentina) G Vilas	6	6	3	8

Third round
14	(United Kingdom) M Cox	6	6	8
WC	(France) P Dominguez	4	1	6
(United States) W Martin	6	6	6
3	(Argentina) G Vilas	2	4	2

Fourth round
14	(United Kingdom) M Cox	6	3	4	6	7
(United States) W Martin	3	6	6	0	9

==== Section 7 ====
First round
6	(Romania) Ilie Năstase	6	6	3	6
(United States) Tom Gullikson	2	1	6	3
LL	(Mexico) Emilio Montaño	1	4	4
(Rhodesia) Andrew Pattison	6	6	6
(Australia) Cliff Letcher	3	6	3	2
Q	(United States) Eliot Teltscher	6	0	6	6
(United States) Pat DuPré	6	6	5	8
Q	(Czechoslovakia) Tomáš Šmid	4	4	7	6
LL	(United States) Rick Fisher	3	3	4
Q	(Australia) Chris Kachel	6	6	6
(Australia) Allan Stone	9	7	6
(Brazil) Carlos Alberto Kirmayr	8	5	2
(Netherlands) Tom Okker	6	6	6
(Australia) Ross Case	2	1	1
(Australia) Steve Docherty	6	4	7	7
16	(United States) Harold Solomon	4	6	5	5

Second round
6	(Romania) I Năstase	7	3	7	8	6
(Rhodesia) A Pattison	9	6	5	6	3
Q	(United States) E Teltscher
(United States) P DuPré	w/o
Q	(Australia) C Kachel	2	6	3
(Australia) A Stone	6	8	6
(Netherlands) T Okker	8	7	6	7
(Australia) S Docherty	9	5	3	5

Third round
6	(Romania) I Năstase	6	6	6
Q	(United States) E Teltscher	4	3	1
(Australia) A Stone	6	6	8	5	4
(Netherlands) T Okker	4	2	9	7	6

Fourth round
6	(Romania) I Năstase	6	6	6	6
(Netherlands) T Okker	8	4	4	4

==== Section 8 ====
First round
12	(Poland) Wojciech Fibak	6	4	4	9	6
(Chile) Jaime Fillol	3	6	6	8	4
Q	(United States) Jim McManus	1	6	4	2
(Sweden) Jan Norbäck	6	3	6	6
(South Africa) Frew McMillan	6	6	6
(West Germany) Jürgen Fassbender	4	4	4
(United Kingdom) Buster Mottram	4	6	6	6
(United States) James "Chico" Hagey	6	4	4	2
(Socialist Federal Republic of Yugoslavia) Nikola Pilić	6	6	6
(United States) Hank Pfister	4	4	1
(India) Vijay Amritraj	4	6	6	7
(United States) Sherwood Stewart	6	4	3	5
WC	(United Kingdom) Michael Wayman	4	6	4	9	5
(Australia) Mark Edmondson	6	2	6	8	7
(Italy) Antonio Zugarelli	4	2	7
2	(Sweden) Björn Borg	6	6	9

Second round
12	(Poland) W Fibak	6	6	6
(Sweden) J Norbäck	3	0	2
(South Africa) F McMillan	4	5	5
(United Kingdom) C Mottram	6	7	7
(Socialist Federal Republic of Yugoslavia) N Pilić	9	6	6
(India) V Amritraj	8	3	2
(Australia) M Edmondson	6	9	2	4	1
2	(Sweden) B Borg	3	7	6	6	6

Third round
12	(Poland) W Fibak	3	9	6	3	6
(United Kingdom) C Mottram	6	8	3	6	2
(Socialist Federal Republic of Yugoslavia) N Pilić	7	5	3
2	(Sweden) B Borg	9	7	6

Fourth round
12	(Poland) W Fibak	5	4	2
2	(Sweden) B Borg	7	6	6

Preceded by 1977 French Open	Grand Slams; Men's singles	Succeeded by 1977 U.S. Open
