= Rory Chappell =

South African tennis player

- Full name: Rory Chappell
- Country (sports): South Africa
- Born: 13 January 1959 Johannesburg, South Africa
- Died: 14 August 2014 (aged 55) Johannesburg, South Africa
- Plays: Left-handed

Singles
- Career record: 8–13
- Career titles: 0
- Highest ranking: No. 195 (2 January 1984)

Grand Slam singles results
- Wimbledon: 1R (1977)

Doubles
- Career record: 3–17

Grand Slam doubles results
- French Open: 1R (1977, 1981, 1982)
- Wimbledon: 2R (1981)

Rory Chappell (13 January 1959 - 14 August 2014) was a South African professional tennis player.

A left-handed player from Johannesburg, Chappell reached a career best singles ranking of 195 in the world and qualified for the main draw of the 1977 Wimbledon Championships.

Chappell died in 2014 at Rosebank Primary School in Johannesburg, where he worked as a tennis coach. He was 55 years of age.
