= Greer Stevens =

South African tennis player

- Country (sports): South Africa
- Born: 15 February 1957 (age 68); Pietermaritzburg, Natal, Union of South Africa
- Height: 1.68 m (5 ft 6 in)
- Turned pro: 1974
- Retired: December 1980
- Plays: Right-handed

Singles
- Career record: 98–59
- Career titles: 4
- Highest ranking: No. 7 (7 July 1980)

Grand Slam singles results
- Australian Open: QF (1980)
- Wimbledon: QF (1980)
- US Open: 4R (1979)

Doubles
- Career record: 93–48
- Career titles: 5

Grand Slam doubles results
- Australian Open: 2R (1980)
- Wimbledon: QF (1977, 1980)
- US Open: SF (1977)

Grand Slam mixed doubles results
- Wimbledon: W (1977, 1979)
- US Open: W (1979)

Greer Stevens (born 15 February 1957) is a retired professional tennis player from South Africa.

== Career ==
Stevens in 1980 reached a career high singles ranking of world No. 7 and the Wimbledon quarterfinals in both singles and doubles. With Bob Hewitt, she won the mixed doubles event at Wimbledon in 1977 and 1979 and at the US Open in 1979. She also played for the Boston Lobsters of World TeamTennis. She retired in December 1980 after competing in the New South Wales Open, having had her career best year.

== Grand Slam finals ==
=== Mixed doubles: 3 (3 titles) ===
Result	Year	Championship	Surface	Partner	Opponents	Score
Win	1977	Wimbledon	Grass	(South Africa) Bob Hewitt	(Netherlands) Betty Stöve (South Africa) Frew McMillan	3–6, 7–5, 6–4
Win	1979	Wimbledon	Grass	(South Africa) Bob Hewitt	(Netherlands) Betty Stöve (South Africa) Frew McMillan	7–5, 7–6
Win	1979	US Open	Hard	(South Africa) Bob Hewitt	(Netherlands) Betty Stöve (South Africa) Frew McMillan	6–3, 7–5

== WTA Tour finals ==
=== Singles: 6 (4–2) ===
Legend Grand Slam tournaments (0–0) WTA Tour Championships (0–0) Virginia Slims, Avon, Other (4–2)	Finals by surface Hard (0–1) Grass (3–0) Clay (0–0) Carpet (1–1)

Result	W/L	Date	Tournament	Surface	Opponent	Score
Win	1–0	May 1975	Surbiton, UK	Grass	(United States) Patti Hogan	6–1, 6–4
Win	2–0	Jun 1975	Chichester, UK	Grass	(United States) Terry Holladay	6–7, 6–4, 6–3
Win	3–0	Jun 1975	Beckenham, UK	Grass	(United States) Patti Hogan	4–6, 6–3, 6–4
Win	4–0	Jan 1979	Hollywood, US	Carpet (i)	(Australia) Dianne Fromholtz	6–4, 2–6, 6–4
Loss	4–1	Jan 1980	Kansas City, US	Carpet (i)	(United States) Martina Navratilova	6–0, 6–2
Loss	4–2	Jul 1980	Montreal, Canada	Hard	(United States) Martina Navratilova	6–2, 6–1

=== Doubles: 17 (5–12) ===
Legend Grand Slam tournaments (0–0) WTA Tour Championships (0–0) Virginia Slims, Avon, Other (5–12)	Finals by surface Hard (0–3) Grass (2–2) Clay (2–2) Carpet (1–5)

Result	No.	Date	Tournament	Surface	Partner	Opponents	Score
Loss	1.	Jun 1974	Manchester	Grass	(United States) Patti Hogan	(United Kingdom) Lesley Charles (United Kingdom) Sue Mappin	6–1, 6–3
Win	1.	Jun 1974	Beckenham	Grass	(South Africa) Rowena Whitehouse	(United States) Sally Greer (United States) Betsy Nagelsen	6–2, 6–4
Loss	2.	Dec 1974	Bloemfontein	Hard	(South Africa) Alison McMillan	(South Africa) Linky Boshoff (United States) Sharon Walsh	6–1, 6–3
Loss	3.	May 1975	Bournemouth	Clay	(South Africa) Linky Boshoff	(United Kingdom) Lesley Charles (United Kingdom) Sue Mappin	6–3, 6–3
Win	2.	May 1975	Guildford	Clay	(United States) Patti Hogan	(United Kingdom) Lesley Charles (United Kingdom) Sue Mappin	6–0, 6–3
Win	3.	May 1975	Surbiton	Grass	(United States) Patti Hogan	(United Kingdom) Lindsay Blachford (Australia) Judy Tegart Dalton	7–9, 6–1, 9–7
Loss	4.	Jun 1975	Chichester	Grass	(United States) Patti Hogan	(Australia) Karen Krantzcke (Australia) Judy Tegart Dalton	4–6, 6–1, 6–4
Win	4.	Aug 1975	South Orange	Clay	(United States) Kristien Shaw	(United States) Kathleen Harter (United States) Kathy May	w/o
Loss	5.	Jan 1976	McAllen, Texas	Hard	(Australia) Jenny Dimond	(Colombia) Isabel Fernández de Soto (Socialist Federal Republic of Yugoslavia) Mima Jaušovec	6–1, 6–2
Loss	6.	Mar 1976	Dallas	Carpet (i)	(United States) Marita Redondo	(United States) Mona Guerrant (United States) Ann Kiyomura	6–3, 4–6, 6–4
Win	5.	Feb 1977	San Francisco	Carpet (i)	(Australia) Kerry Reid	(United Kingdom) Sue Barker (United States) Ann Kiyomura	6–3, 6–1
Loss	7.	Mar 1977	Dallas	Carpet (i)	(Australia) Kerry Reid	(United States) Martina Navratilova (Netherlands) Betty Stöve	6–2, 6–4
Loss	8.	Apr 1978	Hilton Head Island	Clay	(United States) JoAnne Russell	(United States) Billie Jean King (United States) Martina Navratilova	6–3, 7–5
Loss	9.	Jan 1979	Chicago	Carpet (i)	(South Africa) Ilana Kloss	(United States) Rosemary Casals (United States) Betty Ann Grubb Stuart	3–6, 7–5, 7–5
Loss	10.	Jan 1980	Seattle	Carpet (i)	(United Kingdom) Virginia Wade	(United States) Rosemary Casals (Australia) Wendy Turnbull	6–4, 2–6, 7–5
Loss	11.	Feb 1980	Oakland	Carpet (i)	(United Kingdom) Virginia Wade	(United Kingdom) Sue Barker (United States) Ann Kiyomura	6–0, 6–4
Loss	12.	Jul 1980	Montreal	Hard	(United States) Ann Kiyomura	(United States) Pam Shriver (United States) Anne Smith	6–0, 6–4

== Grand Slam singles tournament timeline ==
Key
W	F	SF	QF	#R	RR	Q#	DNQ	A	NH

(W) winner; (F) finalist; (SF) semifinalist; (QF) quarterfinalist; (#R) rounds 4, 3, 2, 1; (RR) round-robin stage; (Q#) qualification round; (DNQ) did not qualify; (A) absent; (NH) not held; (SR) strike rate (events won / competed); (W–L) win–loss record.

Tournament	1974	1975	1976	1977		1978	1979	1980	Career SR
Australian Open	A	A	A	A	A	A	A	QF	0 / 1
French Open	A	A	A	A		A	A	A	0 / 0
Wimbledon	3R	3R	4R	4R		A	4R	QF	0 / 6
US Open	A	3R	2R	2R		A	4R	1R	0 / 5
SR	0 / 1	0 / 2	0 / 2	0 / 2		0 / 0	0 / 2	0 / 3	0 / 12
Year End Ranking		48	17	13		17	12	10	

Note: The Australian Open was held twice in 1977, in January and December.
