= 1977 Wimbledon Championships =

- Date: 20 June – 2 July
- Edition: 91st
- Category: Grand Slam
- Draw: 128S/64D/48XD
- Prize money: £222,540
- Surface: Grass
- Location: Church Road; SW19, Wimbledon, London, United Kingdom
- Venue: All England Lawn Tennis and Croquet Club

Champions

Men's singles
- (Sweden) Björn Borg

Women's singles
- (United Kingdom) Virginia Wade

Men's doubles
- (Australia) Ross Case / (Australia) Geoff Masters

Women's doubles
- (Australia) Helen Cawley / (United States) JoAnne Russell

Mixed doubles
- (South Africa) Bob Hewitt / (South Africa) Greer Stevens

Boys' singles
- (United States) Van Winitsky

Girls' singles
- (United States) Lea Antonoplis
← 1976 ·	Wimbledon Championships	· 1978 →

The 1977 Wimbledon Championships was a tennis tournament that took place on the outdoor grass courts at the All England Lawn Tennis and Croquet Club in Wimbledon, London, United Kingdom. The tournament ran from 20 June until 2 July. It was the 91st staging of the Wimbledon Championships, and the third Grand Slam tennis event of 1977.

== Centenary celebrations ==
On the opening day of the tournament, Monday 20 June, to celebrate the centenary of the first Gentlemen's Singles event, former singles champions were presented with a medal by Prince Edward, Duke of Kent and Katharine, Duchess of Kent on Centre Court. Those attending were: Kitty Godfree, Jean Borotra, René Lacoste, Henri Cochet, Jack Crawford, Sidney Wood, Fred Perry, Dorothy Round, Don Budge, Alice Marble, Yvon Petra, Jack Kramer, Bob Falkenburg, Ted Schroeder, Budge Patty, Dick Savitt, Margaret duPont, Frank Sedgman, Louise Brough, Vic Seixas, Doris Hart, Jaroslav Drobný, Tony Trabert, Shirley Irvin, Lew Hoad, Chuck McKinley, Ashley Cooper, Maria Bueno, Alex Olmedo, Neale Fraser, Angela Barrett, Rod Laver, Karen Susman, Roy Emerson, Billie Jean King, Manuel Santana, John Newcombe, Ann Jones, Evonne Goolagong Cawley, Stan Smith, Jan Kodeš, Arthur Ashe, Chris Evert and Björn Borg. Jacques Brugnon and Elizabeth Ryan were invited to represent all of the doubles champions. Ryan won a total of 19 doubles titles, a record that remains to date. Jimmy Connors (who was the number one seed for the tournament) did not attend the event, choosing instead to practise with Ilie Năstase at the time of the ceremony. This apparent snub by the American earned him harsh booing from the Centre Court crowd when he appeared to play his first round match the following day. The All England Club responded to media enquiries when Major David Mills, the secretary, issued this terse statement: "Medals will be sent only to former champions who indicated they could not be here, and not to those who were here and had the extreme discourtesy not to collect it.".

To commemorate the centenary of the event, all former singles champions were offered a place in the main draw by the All England Club. Several former singles champions (some of whom had been retired) competed in the championships as a result. Björn Borg, Jimmy Connors, Stan Smith, Rod Laver and Jan Kodeš competed in the gentlemen's singles, with John Newcombe and Neale Fraser playing in the doubles. Chris Evert, Maria Bueno, Karen Susman and Billie Jean King played in the ladies singles, with Ann Jones competing in the ladies doubles.

== Prize money ==
The total prize money for 1977 championships was £222,540. The winner of the men's title earned £15,000 while the women's singles champion earned £13,500.

Event	W	F	SF	QF	Round of 16	Round of 32	Round of 64	Round of 128
Men's singles	£15,000	£8,000	£4,000	£2,000	£1,200	£600	£350	£200
Women's singles	£13,500	£7,000	£3,500	£1,600	£925	£460	£270	£150
Men's doubles *	£6,000	£3,000	£2,000	£1,000	£500	£150	£0	—
Women's doubles *	£5,200	£2,600	£1,600	£800	£350	£100	£0	—
Mixed doubles *	£3,000	£1,500	£700	£400	£200	£0	£0	—

_{* per team}

== Champions ==
=== Seniors ===
==== Men's singles ====
(Sweden) Björn Borg defeated (United States) Jimmy Connors, 3–6, 6–2, 6–1, 5–7, 6–4

- It was Borg's second consecutive Wimbledon title and 4th Grand Slam title overall.

==== Women's singles ====
(United Kingdom) Virginia Wade defeated (Netherlands) Betty Stöve, 4–6, 6–3, 6–1

- It was Wade's first and only Wimbledon title, third and final Grand Slam title overall. Wade remains the last British woman to win the singles title at Wimbledon.

==== Men's doubles ====
(Australia) Ross Case / (Australia) Geoff Masters defeated (Australia) John Alexander / (Australia) Phil Dent, 6–3, 6–4, 3–6, 8–9^{(4–7)}, 6–4

==== Women's doubles ====
(Australia) Helen Cawley / (United States) JoAnne Russell defeated (United States) Martina Navratilova / (Netherlands) Betty Stöve, 6–3, 6–3

==== Mixed doubles ====
(South Africa) Bob Hewitt / (South Africa) Greer Stevens defeated (South Africa) Frew McMillan / (Netherlands) Betty Stöve, 3–6, 7–5, 6–4

=== Juniors ===
==== Boys' singles ====
(United States) Van Winitsky defeated (United States) Eliot Teltscher, 6–1, 1–6, 8–6

==== Girls' singles ====
(United States) Lea Antonoplis defeated (United States) Mareen Louie, 7–5, 6–1

== Singles seeds ==
=== Men's singles ===
1. (United States) Jimmy Connors (final, lost to Björn Borg)
2. (Sweden) Björn Borg (champion)
3. (Argentina) Guillermo Vilas (third round, lost to Billy Martin)
4. (United States) Roscoe Tanner (first round, lost to John Lloyd)
5. (United States) Brian Gottfried (second round, lost to Byron Bertram)
6. (Romania) Ilie Năstase (quarterfinals, lost to Björn Borg)
7. (Mexico) Raúl Ramírez (second round, lost to Tim Gullikson)
8. (United States) Vitas Gerulaitis (semifinals, lost to Björn Borg)
9. (United States) Dick Stockton (fourth round, lost to Vitas Gerulaitis)
10. (Italy) Adriano Panatta (second round, lost to Sandy Mayer)
11. (United States) Stan Smith (fourth round, lost to Jimmy Connors)
12. (Poland) Wojciech Fibak (fourth round, lost to Björn Borg)
13. (Australia) Phil Dent (quarterfinals, lost to John McEnroe)
14. (United Kingdom) Mark Cox (fourth round, lost to Billy Martin)
15. (United States) Bob Lutz (third round, lost to Kim Warwick)
16. (United States) Harold Solomon (first round, lost to Steve Docherty)

=== Women's singles ===
1. (United States) Chris Evert (semifinals, lost to Virginia Wade)
2. (United States) Martina Navratilova (quarterfinals, lost to Betty Stöve)
3. (United Kingdom) Virginia Wade (champion)
4. (United Kingdom) Sue Barker (semifinals, lost to Betty Stöve)
5. (United States) Billie Jean King (quarterfinals, lost to Chris Evert)
6. (United States) Rosie Casals (quarterfinals, lost to Virginia Wade)
7. (Netherlands) Betty Stöve (final, lost to Virginia Wade)
8. (Australia) Kerry Reid (quarterfinals, lost to Sue Barker)
9. (Australia) Dianne Fromholtz (withdrew before the tournament began)
10. (Socialist Federal Republic of Yugoslavia) Mima Jaušovec (third round, lost to Marise Kruger)
11. (France) Françoise Dürr (third round, lost to Linky Boshoff)
12. (United States) Kathy May (fourth round, lost to Kerry Reid)

Preceded by 1977 French Open	Grand Slams	Succeeded by 1977 US Open
