= 1982 in tennis =

This page covers all the important events in the sport of tennis in 1982. It provides the results of notable tournaments throughout the year on both the men's and the women's tennis circuits, the Davis Cup, and the Federation Cup.

== Australian Open ==
Category	Champion(s)	Finalist(s)	Score
Men's singles	(United States) Johan Kriek	(United States) Steve Denton	6–3, 6–3, 6–2 (Note: It was Kriek's 2nd and last career Grand Slam title and his 2nd consecutive Australian Open title.)
Women's singles	(United States) Chris Evert	(United States) Martina Navratilova	6–3, 2–6, 6–3 (Note: It was Evert-Lloyd's 13th major title and her 1st Australian Open title.)
Men's doubles	(Australia) John Alexander (Australia) John Fitzgerald	(United States) Andy Andrews (United States) John Sadri	6–4, 7–6 (Note: It was Alexander's 2nd and last career Grand Slam title and his 2nd Australian Open title. It was Fitzgerald's 1st career Grand Slam title and his only Australian Open title.)
Women's doubles	(United States) Martina Navratilova (United States) Pam Shriver	(West Germany) Claudia Kohde (West Germany) Eva Pfaff	6–4, 6–2 (Note: It was Navratilova's 17th career Grand Slam title and her 3rd Australian Open title. It was Shriver's 3rd career Grand Slam title and her 1st Australian Open title.)
Mixed doubles	The competition was not held between 1970 and 1986.		

== French Open ==
Category	Champion(s)	Finalist(s)	Score
Men's singles	(Sweden) Mats Wilander	(Argentina) Guillermo Vilas	1–6, 7–6^{(8–6)}, 6–0, 6–4 (Note: It was Wilander's 1st career title (and his 1st ATP title overall).)
Women's singles	(United States) Martina Navratilova	(United States) Andrea Jaeger	7–6^{(8-6)}, 6–1 (Note: It was Navratilova's 8th title of the year, and her 63rd overall. It was her 4th career Grand Slam title, and her 1st French Open title.)
Men's doubles	(United States) Sherwood Stewart (United States) Ferdi Taygan	(Chile) Hans Gildemeister (Chile) Belus Prajoux	7–5, 6–3, 1–1, retired
Women's doubles	(United States) Martina Navratilova (United States) Anne Smith	(United States) Rosemary Casals (Australia) Wendy Turnbull	6–3, 6–4
Mixed doubles	(Australia) Wendy Turnbull (United Kingdom) John Lloyd	(Brazil) Cláudia Monteiro (Brazil) Cássio Motta	6–2, 7–6

== Wimbledon ==
Category	Champion(s)	Finalist(s)	Score
Men's singles	(United States) Jimmy Connors	(United States) John McEnroe	3–6, 6–3, 6–7^{(2–7)}, 7–6^{(7–5)}, 6–4 (Note: It was Connors's 6th career Grand Slam title and his 2nd and last Wimbledon title.)
Women's singles	(United States) Martina Navratilova	(United States) Chris Evert Lloyd	6–1, 3–6, 6–2 (Note: It was Navratilova's 15th career Grand Slam title and her 3rd Wimbledon title.)
Men's doubles	(Australia) Peter McNamara (Australia) Paul McNamee	(United States) Peter Fleming (United States) John McEnroe	6–3, 6–2 (Note: It was McNamara's 3rd and last career Grand Slam title and his 2nd Wimbledon title. It was McNamee's 3rd career Grand Slam title and his 2nd and last Wimbledon title.)
Women's doubles	(United States) Martina Navratilova (United States) Pam Shriver	(United States) Kathy Jordan (United States) Anne Smith	6–4, 6–1 (Note: It was Navratilova's 16th career Grand Slam title and her 7th Wimbledon title. It was Shriver's 2nd career Grand Slam title and her 2nd Wimbledon title.)
Mixed doubles	(South Africa) Kevin Curren (United States) Anne Smith	(United Kingdom) John Lloyd (Australia) Wendy Turnbull	2–6, 6–3, 7–5 (Note: It was Curren's 2nd career Grand Slam title and his only Wimbledon title. It was Smith's 8th career Grand Slam title and her 2nd Wimbledon title.)

== US Open ==
Category	Champion(s)	Finalist(s)	Score
Men's singles	(United States) Jimmy Connors	(Czechoslovakia) Ivan Lendl	6–3, 6–2, 4–6, 6–4 (Note: It was Connors's 7th career Grand Slam title and his 4th US Open title.)
Women's singles	(United States) Chris Evert-Lloyd	(Czechoslovakia) Hana Mandlíková	6–3, 6–1 (Note: It was Evert-Lloyd's 16th career Grand Slam title and her 6th and last US Open title.)
Men's doubles	(South Africa) Kevin Curren (United States) Steve Denton	(United States) Victor Amaya (United States) Hank Pfister	6–2, 6–7^{(4–7)}, 5–7, 6–2, 6–4 (Note: It was Curren's 3rd career Grand Slam title and his 2nd US Open title. It was Denton's only career Grand Slam title.)
Women's doubles	(United States) Rosemary Casals (Australia) Wendy Turnbull	(United States) Barbara Potter (United States) Sharon Walsh	6–4, 6–4 (Note: It was Casals' 12th and last career Grand Slam title and her 5th US Open title. It was Turnbull's 7th career Grand Slam title and her 3rd and last US Open title.)
Mixed doubles	(United States) Anne Smith (South Africa) Kevin Curren	(United States) Barbara Potter (United States) Ferdi Taygan	6–7, 7–6 ^{(7–4)}, 7–6^{(7–5)} (Note: It was Smith's 9th career Grand Slam title and her 3rd and last US Open title. It was Curren's 4th and last career Grand Slam title and his 3rd US Open title.)

== Davis Cup ==
First round 5–7 March
Carlsbad, CA, United States (hard)
United States	4
India	1
Stockholm, Sweden (indoor carpet)
Sweden	4
Soviet Union	1
Mexico City, Mexico (clay)
Australia	3
Mexico	2
Santiago, Chile (clay)
Romania	1
Chile	3
Christchurch, New Zealand (grass)
Spain	2
New Zealand	3
Rome, Italy (clay)
Italy	3
Great Britain	2
Prague, Czechoslovakia (indoor carpet)
West Germany	0
Czechoslovakia	5
Buenos Aires, Argentina (clay)
France	3
Argentina	2

Quarterfinals; 9–11 July
St. Louis, MO, United States (indoor carpet)
United States	3
Sweden	2
Brisbane, Australia (grass)
Australia	4
Chile	1
Cervia, Italy (clay)
New Zealand	3
Italy	2
Paris, France (clay)
Czechoslovakia	2
France	3

Semifinals; 1–3 October
Perth, Australia (indoor carpet)
United States	5
Australia	0
Aix-en-Provence, France (clay)
New Zealand	2
France	3

Final; 26–28 November
Grenoble, France (indoor clay)
United States	4
France	1

== Federation Cup ==
First Round
United States	3
Indonesia	0
Belgium	1
Mexico	2
Brazil	2
France	0
Hong Kong	2
Chinese Taipei	1
Czechoslovakia	2
Canada	1
Philippines	3
Senegal	0
Austria	1
Israel	2
Italy	1
Great Britain	2
Switzerland	2
New Zealand	1
Sweden
Yugoslavia	w/o
Japan	0
China	3
Portugal	0
West Germany	3
Soviet Union	3
Spain	0
Peru	2
Argentina	1
Denmark	0
Netherlands	3
South Korea	0
Australia	3

Second Round
United States	3
Mexico	0
Brazil	3
Hong Kong	0
Czechoslovakia	3
Philippines	0
Israel	0
Great Britain	3
Switzerland	2
Sweden	1
China	0
West Germany	3
Soviet Union	2
Peru	1
Netherlands	0
Australia	3

Quarterfinals
United States	3
Brazil	0
Czechoslovakia	2
Great Britain	1
Switzerland	0
West Germany	3
Soviet Union	0
Australia	3

Semifinals
United States	3
Czechoslovakia	0
West Germany	3
Australia	0

Final
United States	3
West Germany	0
