= 1987 Virginia Slims of Kansas – Singles =

Singles
- 1987 Virginia Slims of Kansas

Final
- Champion: (United States) Barbara Potter
- Runner-up: (Soviet Union) Larisa Savchenko
- Score: 7–6^{(8–6)}, 7–6^{(7–5)}

Details
- Draw: 32 (4Q)
- Seeds: 8

Events
Singles	Doubles
← 1986 ·	Virginia Slims of Kansas	· 1988 →

Wendy White was the defending champion, but lost in the semifinals to Larisa Savchenko.

Barbara Potter won the title by defeating Savchenko 7–6^{(8–6)}, 7–6^{(7–5)} in the final.

== Seeds ==
1. (United States) Barbara Potter (champion)
2. (Soviet Union) Larisa Savchenko (final)
3. (United States) Pam Casale (first round)
4. (United States) Wendy White (semifinals)
5. (United States) Ann Henricksson (first round)
6. (West Germany) Sylvia Hanika (quarterfinals)
7. (United States) Lisa Bonder (first round)
8. (United States) Anne White (first round)

== Draw ==
=== Key ===
- Q = Qualifier
- WC = Wild card
- LL = Lucky loser
- Alt = Alternate
- ITF = ITF entry
- PR = Protected ranking
- SR = Special ranking
- SE = Special exempt
- JE = Junior exempt
- JR = Junior Accelerator Programme entrant
- CO = College Accelerator Programme entrant
- NG = Next Gen Accelerator Program entrant
- w/o = Walkover
- r = Retired
- d = Defaulted

=== Finals ===
Semifinals
1	(United States) Barbara Potter	5	6	6
Q	(France) Emmanuelle Derly	7	2	3
4	(United States) Wendy White	7	2	4
2	(Soviet Union) Larisa Savchenko	5	6	6

Final
1	(United States) Barbara Potter	7^{8}	7^{7}
2	(Soviet Union) Larisa Savchenko	6^{6}	6^{5}

=== Top half ===
First round
1	(United States) B Potter	6	6
(Spain) A Sánchez Vicario	1	2
(Czechoslovakia) I Budařová	2	6	3
(United States) C Reynolds	7	2	6
(France) N Tauziat	4	3
(United States) M Van Nostrand	6	6
Q	(Czechoslovakia) J Novotná	6	6
7	(United States) L Bonder	3	3
3	(United States) P Casale	6	3	4
(United States) G Kim	4	6	6
Q	(Soviet Union) N Bykova	7	6
(France) C Suire	6	0
(Soviet Union) S Parkhomenko	6	2	4
(United States) ML Piatek	2	6	6
Q	(France) E Derly	7	6
5	(United States) A Henricksson	6	3

Second round
1	(United States) B Potter	6	7
(United States) C Reynolds	4	5
(United States) M Van Nostrand	1	6	3
Q	(Czechoslovakia) J Novotná	6	2	6
(United States) G Kim	2	1
Q	(Soviet Union) N Bykova	6	6
(United States) ML Piatek	3	2
Q	(France) E Derly	6	6

Quarterfinals
1	(United States) B Potter	7	6
Q	(Czechoslovakia) J Novotná	6	3
Q	(Soviet Union) N Bykova	7	3	1
Q	(France) E Derly	6	6	6

Semifinals
1	(United States) B Potter	5	6	6
Q	(France) E Derly	7	2	3

=== Bottom half ===
First round
8	(United States) A White	4	2
(Soviet Union) N Zvereva	6	6
Q	(France) A Dechaume	6	6
(United States) T Holladay	1	3
(United States) T Mochizuki	2	4
(United States) H Na	6	6
(West Germany) C Porwik	2	3
4	(United States) W White	6	6
6	(West Germany) S Hanika	6	6
(Argentina) A Villagrán	1	1
(United States) D Spence	6	6
(United States) K Schaefer	2	2
(United States) C Benjamin	3	6	6
(South Africa) D Van Rensburg	6	1	4
(France) I Demongeot	4	5
2	(Soviet Union) L Savchenko	6	7

Second round
(Soviet Union) N Zvereva	7	4	7
Q	(France) A Dechaume	6	6	5
(United States) H Na	3	6
4	(United States) W White	6	7
6	(West Germany) S Hanika	7	6
(United States) D Spence	6	2
(United States) C Benjamin	6	2
2	(Soviet Union) L Savchenko	7	6

Quarterfinals
(Soviet Union) N Zvereva
4	(United States) W White	w/o
6	(West Germany) S Hanika	3	3
2	(Soviet Union) L Savchenko	6	6

Semifinals
4	(United States) W White	7	2	4
2	(Soviet Union) L Savchenko	5	6	6
