= 1982 Avon Championships of Kansas City =

- Date: 8–14 February
- Edition: 4th
- Category: Avon Championships circuit
- Draw: 16S / 8D
- Prize money: $100,000
- Surface: Carpet (Sporteze) / indoor
- Location: Kansas City, Missouri, U.S.
- Venue: Municipal Auditorium

Champions

Singles
- (United States) Martina Navratilova

Doubles
- (United States) Barbara Potter / (United States) Sharon Walsh
← 1981 ·	Virginia Slims of Kansas	· 1983 →

The 1982 Avon Championships of Kansas City was a women's tennis tournament played on indoor carpet courts at the Municipal Auditorium in Kansas City, Missouri in the United States that was part of the 1982 Virginia Slims World Championship Series. It was the fourth edition of the tournament and was held from February 8 through February 14, 1982. First-seeded Martina Navratilova won the singles title and earned $22,000 first-prize money.

== Finals ==
=== Singles ===
(United States) Martina Navratilova defeated (United States) Barbara Potter 6–2, 6–2

- It was Navratilova's 4th singles title of the year and the 59th of her career.

=== Doubles ===
(United States) Barbara Potter / (United States) Sharon Walsh defeated (United States) Mary Lou Piatek / (United States) Anne Smith 4–6, 6–2, 6–2

== Prize money ==
Event	W	F	SF	QF	Round of 16	Prel. round
Singles	$22,000	$11,000	$6,050	$3,000	$1,650	$900
