= Jill Davis (tennis) =

American tennis player

- Country (sports): United States
- Born: June 23, 1960 (age 65)
- Prize money: US$ 20,437

Singles

Grand Slam singles results
- French Open: 1R (1983)
- Wimbledon: 2R (1983)
- US Open: 2R (1982)

Doubles

Grand Slam doubles results
- French Open: 1R (1983)
- Wimbledon: 2R (1983)
- US Open: 3R (1982)

Jill Davis (born June 23, 1960) is an American former professional tennis player.

== Biography ==
Davis grew up in Quakertown, Pennsylvania and was initially a competitive swimmer, before taking up tennis around the age of 12. She received a scholarship to play tennis for Southern Methodist University in Texas, leaving after her freshman year to turn professional.

At the 1982 US Open she played a second round match against Martina Navratilova, which she lost in straight sets, but managed to take the top seed to a tiebreak in the first set.

Davis also featured in the main draws of the French Open and Wimbledon during her career. This included the 1983 Wimbledon Championships, where she lost a close second round match to Camille Benjamin, 9–11 in the third set. She won the Australian Open juniors, and her first professional tournament as an amateur, the Western Australian Open. She retired from tennis at the age of 28 and later worked as a paramedic. She then graduated from the University of New England College of Osteopathic Medicine.
