= 1982 US Open (tennis) =

- Date: August 31 – September 12
- Edition: 102nd
- Category: Grand Slam (ITF)
- Surface: Hardcourt / outdoor
- Location: New York City, New York, United States

Champions

Men's singles
- (United States) Jimmy Connors

Women's singles
- (United States) Chris Evert-Lloyd

Men's doubles
- (South Africa) Kevin Curren / (United States) Steve Denton

Women's doubles
- (United States) Rosemary Casals / (Australia) Wendy Turnbull

Mixed doubles
- (United States) Anne Smith / (South Africa) Kevin Curren

Boys' singles
- (Australia) Pat Cash

Girls' singles
- (United States) Beth Herr

Boys' doubles
- (United States) Jonathan Canter / (United States) Michael Kures

Girls' doubles
- (United States) Penny Barg / (United States) Beth Herr
- US Open

The 1982 US Open was a tennis tournament played on outdoor hard courts at the USTA National Tennis Center in New York City in New York in the United States. It was the 102nd edition of the US Open and was held from August 31 to September 12, 1982.

== Seniors ==
=== Men's singles ===
(United States) Jimmy Connors defeated (Czechoslovakia) Ivan Lendl 6–3, 6–2, 4–6, 6–4

- It was Connors's 7th career Grand Slam title and his 4th US Open title.

=== Women's singles ===
(United States) Chris Evert-Lloyd defeated (Czechoslovakia) Hana Mandlíková 6–3, 6–1

- It was Evert-Lloyd's 16th career Grand Slam title and her 6th and last US Open title.

=== Men's doubles ===
(South Africa) Kevin Curren / (United States) Steve Denton defeated (United States) Victor Amaya / (United States) Hank Pfister 6–2, 6–7^{(4–7)}, 5–7, 6–2, 6–4

- It was Curren's 3rd career Grand Slam title and his 2nd US Open title. It was Denton's only career Grand Slam title.

=== Women's doubles ===
(United States) Rosemary Casals / (Australia) Wendy Turnbull defeated (United States) Barbara Potter / (United States) Sharon Walsh 6–4, 6–4

- It was Casals' 12th and last career Grand Slam title and her 5th US Open title. It was Turnbull's 7th career Grand Slam title and her 3rd and last US Open title.

=== Mixed doubles ===
(United States) Anne Smith / (South Africa) Kevin Curren defeated (United States) Barbara Potter / (United States) Ferdi Taygan 6–7, 7–6 ^{(7–4)}, 7–6^{(7–5)}

- It was Smith's 9th career Grand Slam title and her 3rd and last US Open title. It was Curren's 4th and last career Grand Slam title and his 3rd US Open title.

== Juniors ==
=== Boys' singles ===
(Australia) Pat Cash defeated (France) Guy Forget 6–3, 6–3

=== Girls' singles ===
(United States) Beth Herr defeated (United States) Gretchen Rush 6–3, 6–1

=== Boys' doubles ===
(United States) Jonathan Canter / (United States) Michael Kures defeated (Australia) Pat Cash / (Australia) John Frawley 7–6, 6–3

=== Girls' doubles ===
(United States) Penny Barg / (United States) Beth Herr defeated (United States) Ann Hulbert / (Australia) Bernadette Randall 1–6, 7–5, 7–6

== Prize money ==
| Event | | W | F | SF | QF | 4R | 3R | 2R | 1R |
| Singles | Men | $90,000 | $45,000 | $22,500 | $11,400 | $6,600 | $3,600 | $2,100 | $1,200 |
| Singles | Women | $90,000 | $45,000 | $22,500 | $11,400 | $6,600 | $3,600 | $2,100 | $1,200 |

Total prize money for the event was $1,386,000, including Grand Prix contribution $1,516,000.

| Preceded by 1982 Wimbledon Championships | Grand Slams | Succeeded by 1982 Australian Open |
