= 1987 Virginia Slims of Kansas – Doubles =

Doubles
- 1987 Virginia Slims of Kansas

Final
- Champions: (Soviet Union) Svetlana Parkhomenko (Soviet Union) Larisa Savchenko
- Runners-up: (United States) Barbara Potter (United States) Wendy White
- Score: 6–2, 6–4

Details
- Draw: 16
- Seeds: 4

Events
Singles	Doubles
← 1986 ·	Virginia Slims of Kansas	· 1988 →

Kathy Jordan and Candy Reynolds were the defending champions, but Jordan did not compete this year. Reynolds teamed up with Catherine Suire and lost in the quarterfinals to Ann Henricksson and Molly Van Nostrand.

Svetlana Parkhomenko and Larisa Savchenko won the title by defeating Barbara Potter and Wendy White 6–2, 6–4 in the final.

== Seeds ==
1. (Soviet Union) Svetlana Parkhomenko / (Soviet Union) Larisa Savchenko (champions)
2. (United States) Mary Lou Piatek / (United States) Anne White (semifinals)
3. (United States) Candy Reynolds / (France) Catherine Suire (quarterfinals)
4. (France) Pascale Paradis / (United States) JoAnne Russell (first round)

== Draw ==
=== Key ===
- Q = Qualifier
- WC = Wild card
- LL = Lucky loser
- Alt = Alternate
- ITF = ITF entry
- PR = Protected ranking
- SR = Special ranking
- SE = Special exempt
- JE = Junior exempt
- JR = Junior Accelerator Programme entrant
- CO = College Accelerator Programme entrant
- NG = Next Gen Accelerator Program entrant
- w/o = Walkover
- r = Retired
- d = Defaulted

=== Draw ===
First round
1	(Soviet Union) A Parkhomenko (Soviet Union) L Savchenko	6	7
(Netherlands) M Bollegraf (Netherlands) N Jagerman	3	5
(Sweden) C Karlsson (Sweden) M Lindström	6	1	2
(Czechoslovakia) I Budařová (Czechoslovakia) J Novotná	4	6	6
3	(United States) C Reynolds (France) C Suire	6	6
(Spain) A Sánchez Vicario (United States) N Sodupe	1	4
(United States) C Benjamin (United States) P Casale	3	2
(United States) A Henricksson (United States) M Van Nostrand	6	6
(United States) B Potter (United States) W White	6	7
(Soviet Union) L Meskhi (Soviet Union) N Zvereva	1	6
(France) I Demongeot (France) N Tauziat	6	0	6
4	(France) P Paradis (United States) J Russell	3	6	3
(West Germany) C Porwik (Spain) A Sánchez Vicario	3	2
(United States) T Holladay (United States) K McDaniel	6	6
(South Africa) E Reinach (South Africa) M Reinach	4	6	6
2	(United States) ML Piatek (United States) A White	6	2	7

Quarterfinals
1	(Soviet Union) A Parkhomenko (Soviet Union) L Savchenko	6	7
(Czechoslovakia) I Budařová (Czechoslovakia) J Novotná	4	5
3	(United States) C Reynolds (France) C Suire	6	2
(United States) A Henricksson (United States) M Van Nostrand	7	6
(United States) B Potter (United States) W White	6	6	6
(France) I Demongeot (France) N Tauziat	4	7	3
(United States) T Holladay (United States) K McDaniel	2	3
2	(United States) ML Piatek (United States) A White	6	6

Semifinals
1	(Soviet Union) A Parkhomenko (Soviet Union) L Savchenko	5	7	6
(United States) A Henricksson (United States) M Van Nostrand	7	6	2
(United States) B Potter (United States) W White	6	7
2	(United States) ML Piatek (United States) A White	4	5

Final
1	(Soviet Union) A Parkhomenko (Soviet Union) L Savchenko	6	6
(United States) B Potter (United States) W White	2	4
