= Jai DiLouie =

American tennis player

- Full name: Jai DiLouie
- Country (sports): United States
- Born: September 11, 1958 (age 67) Dallas, Texas
- Turned pro: 1980
- Retired: 1984
- Plays: Left-handed

Singles
- Career record: 4–14
- Career titles: 0

Grand Slam singles results
- Australian Open: 2R (1978)
- US Open: 1R (1978, 1982)

Doubles
- Career record: 16–30
- Career titles: 0

Grand Slam doubles results
- Australian Open: 1R (1976, 1978, 1980)
- US Open: 1R (1978, 1982)

Jai DiLouie (born September 11, 1958) is a former professional tennis player from the United States.

== Biography ==
DiLouie, a left-handed player from Dallas, was the top ranked junior in Texas in 1974 and 1975. A member of the US Junior Davis Cup team, he won National Grass Court Junior Tennis title in 1975, after saving eight match points against John McEnroe in the semi-finals. He won the junior event held at the 1976 Australian Open and also participated in the men's doubles draw. Just weeks after that tournament he was runner-up to Ray Kelly in the Australian Under 19's Championships in Brisbane. He was coached from the age of nine by former Australian player Warren Jacques.

In singles his first Grand Slam main draw appearances came in 1978, at the US Open where he lost in the opening round to Johan Kriek, then the Australian Open, in which he made the second round, beating Rod Frawley.

As a member of the varsity tennis at Southern Methodist University he was a three-time All-American, in 1977, 1979 and 1980. He won the singles title at the Southwest Conference in 1979 and made the NCAA doubles quarter-finals in 1980.

Following the completion of his business administration degree, DiLouie turned professional and competed on tour for a further four years. He won a Challenger title in Turin in 1980, with Wayne Hampson in the doubles. At the 1982 South Orange Open, a tournament on the Grand Prix circuit, DiLouie was a doubles finalist with Blaine Willenborg. They were beaten in the final by Raúl Ramírez and Van Winitsky. He played as a qualifier at the 1982 US Open.

At the beginning of the 1987 season, DiLouie began coaching Chris Evert. Later in the year he was appointed women's head coach at Southern Methodist University and led the team to the SWC Team Championship. He remained with Evert until October 1989 and also worked as a coach for the Lawn Tennis Association in England. From 1992 to 1993 he was Director of Tennis at Springpark Tennis and Swim Club, then worked for many years as a national coach for the United States Tennis Association.

== Grand Prix career finals ==
=== Doubles: 1 (0–1) ===
Result	W/L	Date	Tournament	Surface	Partner	Opponents	Score
Loss	0–1	Aug 1982	South Orange, U. S.	Clay	(United States) Blaine Willenborg	(Mexico) Raúl Ramírez (United States) Van Winitsky	6–3, 4–6, 1–6

== Challenger titles ==
=== Doubles: (1) ===
No.	Year	Tournament	Surface	Partner	Opponents	Score
1.	1980	Turin, Italy	Clay	(Australia) Wayne Hampson	(United States) Dave Siegler (South Africa) Robbie Venter	6–3, 6–4
