= 1982 US Open – Men's singles =

Men's singles
- 1982 US Open

Final
- Champion: (United States) Jimmy Connors
- Runner-up: (Czechoslovakia) Ivan Lendl
- Score: 6–3, 6–2, 4–6, 6–4

Details
- Draw: 128 (16 Q )
- Seeds: 16

Events
Singles	men	women		boys	girls
Doubles	men	women	mixed	boys	girls
WC Singles	men	women	quad
WC Doubles	men	women	quad
Legends	men	women	mixed
- US Open

Jimmy Connors defeated Ivan Lendl in the final, 6–3, 6–2, 4–6, 6–4 to win the men's singles tennis title at the 1982 US Open. It was his fourth US Open singles title and seventh major singles title overall. It was the first of eight consecutive US Open finals for Lendl.

John McEnroe was the three-time defending champion, but lost in the semifinals to Lendl.

== Seeds ==
The seeded players are listed below. Jimmy Connors is the champion; others show the round in which they were eliminated.

1. (United States) John McEnroe (semifinalist)
2. (United States) Jimmy Connors (champion)
3. (Czechoslovakia) Ivan Lendl (finalist)
4. (Argentina) Guillermo Vilas (semifinalist)
5. (United States) Vitas Gerulaitis (first round)
6. (United States) Gene Mayer (quarterfinalist)
7. (Argentina) José Luis Clerc (first round)
8. (United States) Eliot Teltscher (fourth round)
9. (France) Yannick Noah (fourth round)
10. (United States) Johan Kriek (third round)
11. (Sweden) Mats Wilander (fourth round)
12. (United States) Steve Denton (fourth round)
13. (Australia) Mark Edmondson (second round)
14. (United States) Brian Teacher (second round)
15. (Mexico) Raúl Ramírez (second round)
16. (United States) Roscoe Tanner (second round)

== Draw ==
=== Key ===
- Q = Qualifier
- WC = Wild card
- LL = Lucky loser
- r = Retired

=== Finals ===
Quarterfinals
1	(United States) John McEnroe	4	7^{7}	6	4	6
6	(United States) Gene Mayer	6	6^{4}	3	6	1
3	(Czechoslovakia) Ivan Lendl	6	6	6
(Australia) Kim Warwick	4	3	1
(United States) Tom Gullikson	2	1	3
4	(Argentina) Guillermo Vilas	6	6	6
(United States) Rodney Harmon	1	3	4
2	(United States) Jimmy Connors	6	6	6

Semifinals
1	(United States) John McEnroe	4	4	6^{6}
3	(Czechoslovakia) Ivan Lendl	6	6	7^{8}
4	(Argentina) Guillermo Vilas	1	6	2	3
2	(United States) Jimmy Connors	6	3	6	6

Final
3	(Czechoslovakia) Ivan Lendl	3	2	6	4
2	(United States) Jimmy Connors	6	6	4	6

=== Section 1 ===
First round
1	(United States) McEnroe	7^{7}	6	7
(United States) Ti. Gullikson	6^{2}	4	5
(United States) Davis	6	6	6
(United States) Lapidus	3	4	2
(United States) Van Patten	6	7	1	4	7
(United States) Lipton	2	6	6	6	6
Q	(United States) Brunnberg	4	6	6	6	6
(United States) DuPré	6	3	7	2	3
Q	(Sweden) Simonsson	7	6	6
(Zimbabwe) Ismail	5	1	1
(United States) Smith	4	6	6	7
(United States) Leach	6	4	3	5
(Republic of Ireland) Doyle	6	4	6	6
(Chile) Acuña	4	6	0	4
Q	(United States) Adams	6	3	2
13	(Australia) Edmondson	7	6	6

Second round
1	(United States) McEnroe	7	6	6
(United States) Davis	6	4	3
(United States) Van Patten	6	5	6	6
Q	(United States) Brunnberg	4	7	1	3
Q	(Sweden) Simonsson	6	7	6
(United States) Smith	0	6	3
(Republic of Ireland) Doyle	1	7	7	6
13	(Australia) Edmondson	6	6	5	2

Third round
1	(United States) McEnroe	6	6	6
(United States) Van Patten	3	2	3
Q	(Sweden) Simonsson	6	2	3	1
(Republic of Ireland) Doyle	3	6	6	6

Fourth round
1	(United States) McEnroe	6	6	6
(Republic of Ireland) Doyle	3	4	4

=== Section 2 ===
First round
15	(Mexico) Ramírez	6	6	6
(South Africa) Edwards	3	3	1
(South Africa) Van der Merwe	6	5	6	3	6
(South Africa) Tarr	1	7	3	6	4
(Nigeria) Odizor	6	6	6
(United States) Cahill	4	4	3
(Australia) Drewett	6	1	1
(United States) Lutz	7	6	6
(United States) Dickson	6	6	1	7
Q	(United States) Testerman	2	2	6	6
(United States) Van't Hof	6	6	4	6
Q	(South Africa) Myburg	1	3	6	2
(United States) Iskersky	7	3	7	1	1
(Sweden) Simonsson	6	6	5	6	6
(Czechoslovakia) Granát	4	4	2
6	(United States) Mayer	6	6	6

Second round
15	(Mexico) Ramírez	2	3	7	4
(South Africa) Van der Merwe	6	6	5	6
(Nigeria) Odizor	1	4	7	5
(United States) Lutz	6	6	5	7
(United States) Dickson	2	6	6	1
(United States) Van't Hof	6	4	4	0	r
(Sweden) Simonsson	2	1	1
6	(United States) Mayer	6	6	6

Third round
(South Africa) Van der Merwe	7	4	2	2
(United States) Lutz	6	6	6	6
(United States) Dickson	4	7	2	1
6	(United States) Mayer	6	6	6	6

Fourth round
(United States) Lutz	4	2	1
6	(United States) Mayer	6	6	6

=== Section 3 ===
First round
3	(Czechoslovakia) Lendl	6	7	6
(India) Krishnan	4	6	1
(United States) Mayotte	6	6	6
(Zimbabwe) Pattison	4	4	2
(United States) Bourne	5	4	1
(United States) Solomon	7	6	6
(France) Tulasne	3	6	6	6
(United States) Rennert	6	1	4	4
(United States) Wilkison	4	2	7	7	6
(New Zealand) Simpson	6	6	5	5	1
(United States) Stefanki	6	6	7
(United States) Pate	4	4	5
(Bolivia) Martinez	1	1	3
(United States) Manson	6	6	6
(United States) Scanlon	4	3	1
11	(Sweden) Wilander	6	6	6

Second round
3	(Czechoslovakia) Lendl	6	3	4	7	6
(United States) Mayotte	4	6	6	6	4
(United States) Solomon	6	6	7	6
(France) Tulasne	2	7	5	0
(United States) Wilkison	6	6	3	3	6
(United States) Stefanki	2	2	6	6	3
(United States) Manson	2	6	1
11	(Sweden) Wilander	6	7	6

Third round
3	(Czechoslovakia) Lendl	6	6	6
(United States) Solomon	3	0	1
(United States) Wilkison	4	1	6
11	(Sweden) Wilander	6	6	7

Fourth round
3	(Czechoslovakia) Lendl	6	6	6
11	(Sweden) Wilander	2	2	2

=== Section 4 ===
First round
9	(France) Noah	6	7	6
(South Africa) Curren	3	6	3
(United States) Gottfried	7	6	6
(United States) Waltke	5	0	3
(Brazil) Soares	6	4	6	6	3
Q	(United States) Gilbert	7	6	4	4	6
Q	(United States) Korita	6	4	4	6	6
Q	(France) Vanier	4	6	6	1	2
(United States) Murphy	4	5	1
(Switzerland) Günthardt	6	7	6
(United States) Fromm	6	6	6
Q	(Australia) Cash	3	3	2
Q	(United States) Mayotte	6	3	3	7	6
(Poland) Fibak	4	6	6	6	2
(Australia) Warwick	3	6	1	6	7
7	(Argentina) Clerc	6	4	6	1	6

Second round
9	(France) Noah	6	6	6
(United States) Gottfried	3	4	4
Q	(United States) Gilbert	3	2	6	3
Q	(United States) Korita	6	6	4	6
(Switzerland) Günthardt	6	6	7	7
(United States) Fromm	4	7	5	6
Q	(United States) Mayotte	0	2	0
(Australia) Warwick	6	6	6

Third round
9	(France) Noah	7	6	6	3	6
Q	(United States) Korita	5	7	4	6	4
(Switzerland) Günthardt	3	2	1
(Australia) Warwick	6	6	6

Fourth round
9	(France) Noah	7	3	5	4
(Australia) Warwick	5	6	7	6

=== Section 5 ===
First round
5	(United States) Gerulaitis	4	6	3
(United States) Buehning	6	7	6
(New Zealand) Simpson	2	4	3
(United States) Brown	6	6	6
(South Africa) Sauer	6	6	6
(United States) Letts	4	4	3
(France) Goven	2	1	6	3
(Chile) Fillol Sr.	6	6	1	6
(United States) Fagel	3	2	2
(France) Potier	6	6	6
(Australia) Alexander	6	6	6	4	6
(United States) To. Gullikson	2	4	7	6	7
(United States) Hooper	6	6	7
(United States) Freeman	1	4	5
(Sweden) Hjertquist	6	1	6	4	3
16	(United States) Tanner	2	6	4	6	6

Second round
(United States) Buehning	7	4	6	1	6
(United States) Brown	5	6	4	6	3
(South Africa) Sauer	6	5	4	7	6
(Chile) Fillol Sr.	4	7	6	6	7
(France) Potier	3	1	3
(United States) To. Gullikson	6	6	6
(United States) Hooper	6	7	4	7	7
16	(United States) Tanner	7	6	6	5	6

Third round
(United States) Buehning	6	6	2	2
(Chile) Fillol Sr.	7	3	6	6
(United States) To. Gullikson	6	6	7	6
(United States) Hooper	7	4	6	3

Fourth round
(Chile) Fillol Sr.	4	3	3
(United States) To. Gullikson	6	6	6

=== Section 6 ===
First round
12	(United States) Denton	7	4	6	6
(France) Leconte	6	6	3	4
(United States) McCain	5	5	6
(Italy) Panatta	7	7	7
(United States) Purcell	6	1	6	7
(Brazil) Motta	3	6	1	6
(United States) Stewart	2	7	6	7
(United States) Andrews	6	6	1	5
Q	(United States) DiLouie	3	2	6
(Australia) Carter	6	6	7
Q	(United States) De Palmer	7	6	6
(Spain) López-Maeso	5	4	4
(Brazil) Hocevar	4	6	6	6
(United States) Krulevitz	6	3	1	0
(United States) Dunk	7	3	4	2
4	(Argentina) Vilas	6	6	6	6

Second round
12	(United States) Denton	6	6	7
(Italy) Panatta	3	2	6
(United States) Purcell	6	6	6
(United States) Stewart	1	3	0
(Australia) Carter	6	1	5
Q	(United States) De Palmer	7	6	7
(Brazil) Hocevar	4	2	3
4	(Argentina) Vilas	6	6	6

Third round
12	(United States) Denton	4	6	3	6	6
(United States) Purcell	6	2	6	3	3
Q	(United States) De Palmer	3	5	6	1
4	(Argentina) Vilas	6	7	4	6

Fourth round
12	(United States) Denton	6	6	3	6^{4}	3
4	(Argentina) Vilas	3	4	6	7^{7}	6

=== Section 7 ===
First round
8	(United States) Teltscher	6	7	6
(United States) Gurfein	4	5	4
Q	(United States) Leeds	6	1
(Sweden) Högstedt	2	0	r
(New Zealand) Lewis	6	6	6
(United States) Saviano	4	2	2
Q	(United States) Shiras	5	2	2
(United States) Mitchell	7	6	6
Q	(United States) Brawley	1	4	3
(Sweden) Sundström	6	6	6
(West Germany) Gehring	6	0	5	2
(United States) Harmon	4	6	7	6
(South Africa) Visser	6	2	6	3	4
Q	(United States) Davis	4	6	1	6	6
(United States) Sadri	3	2	2
14	(United States) Teacher	6	6	6

Second round
8	(United States) Teltscher	6	6	6
Q	(United States) Leeds	3	1	2
(New Zealand) Lewis	6	6	7
(United States) Mitchell	3	4	6
(Sweden) Sundström	4	2	2	r
(United States) Harmon	6	6	3
Q	(United States) Davis	7	7	7
14	(United States) Teacher	6	6	6

Third round
8	(United States) Teltscher	4	7	6	6
(New Zealand) Lewis	6	5	3	0
(United States) Harmon	3	6	6	7
Q	(United States) Davis	6	4	4	6

Fourth round
8	(United States) Teltscher	4	6	3	6	6^{1}
(United States) Harmon	6	4	6	3	7^{7}

=== Section 8 ===
First round
10	(United States) Kriek	6	6	6
(United States) Stockton	2	2	2
(France) Roger-Vasselin	3	4	2
(United States) Amaya	6	6	6
(United States) Estep	3	6	2
(Romania) Năstase	6	7	6
(United States) Moor	6	6	6	6
(United States) Walts	7	2	3	3
(Israel) Glickstein	4	6	6	6
(Brazil) Góes	6	1	2	1
(Finland) Palin	7	1	2	2
(United States) Arias	6	6	6	6
(Australia) Dent	0	3	4
(United States) Pfister	6	6	6
(United States) Borowiak	6^{5}	2	3
2	(United States) Connors	7^{7}	6	6

Second round
10	(United States) Kriek	7	7	7
(United States) Amaya	6	5	5
(Romania) Năstase	6	6	7
(United States) Moor	3	4	6
(Israel) Glickstein	4	2	1
(United States) Arias	6	6	6
(United States) Pfister	4	3	2
2	(United States) Connors	6	6	6

Third round
10	(United States) Kriek	6	6	7	3	2
(Romania) Năstase	4	7	6	6	6
(United States) Arias	4	6	4	1
2	(United States) Connors	6	4	6	6

Fourth round
(Romania) Năstase	3	3	4
2	(United States) Connors	6	6	6

Preceded by 1982 Wimbledon Championships – Men's singles	Grand Slam men's singles	Succeeded by 1982 Australian Open – Men's singles
