= 1987 Virginia Slims of Kansas =

- Date: February 2–8
- Edition: 7th
- Category: Category 1+
- Draw: 32S / 16D
- Prize money: $75,000
- Surface: Hard (DecoTurf II) / indoor
- Location: Wichita, Kansas, U.S.
- Venue: Kansas Coliseum

Champions

Singles
- (United States) Barbara Potter

Doubles
- (Soviet Union) Svetlana Parkhomenko (Soviet Union) Larisa Savchenko
- Virginia Slims of Kansas

The 1987 Virginia Slims of Kansas was a women's tennis tournament played on indoor hard courts at the Kansas Coliseum in Wichita, Kansas in the United States and was part of the Category 1+ tier of the 1987 WTA Tour. It was the seventh edition of the tournament and ran from February 2 through February 28, 1987. First-seeded Barbara Potter won the singles title and earned $15,000 first-prize money as well as 190 ranking points.

== Finals ==
=== Singles ===
(United States) Barbara Potter defeated (Soviet Union) Larisa Savchenko 7–6^{(8–6)}, 7–6^{(7–5)}

- It was Potter's 1st singles title of the year and the 5th of her career.

=== Doubles ===
(Soviet Union) Svetlana Parkhomenko / (Soviet Union) Larisa Savchenko defeated (United States) Barbara Potter / (United States) Wendy White 6–2, 6–4
