= 1982 US Open – Men's doubles =

Men's doubles
- 1982 US Open

Final
- Champion: (South Africa) Kevin Curren (United States) Steve Denton
- Runner-up: (United States) Victor Amaya (United States) Hank Pfister
- Score: 6–2, 6–7^{(4–7)}, 5–7, 6–2, 6–4

Details
- Draw: 64
- Seeds: 16

Events
| Singles | men | women | | boys | girls |
| Doubles | men | women | mixed | boys | girls |
| WC Singles | men | women | quad |
| WC Doubles | men | women | quad |
| Legends | men | women | mixed |
| ← 1981 · | US Open | · 1983 → |

The men's doubles tournament at the 1982 US Open was held from August 31 to September 12, 1982, on the outdoor hard courts at the USTA National Tennis Center in New York City, United States. Kevin Curren and Steve Denton won the title, defeating Victor Amaya and Hank Pfister in the final.

== Seeds ==
1. (United States) Peter Fleming / (United States) John McEnroe (quarterfinals)
2. (United States) Sherwood Stewart / (United States) Ferdi Taygan (second round)
3. (South Africa) Kevin Curren / (United States) Steve Denton (champions)
4. (Australia) Mark Edmondson / (Australia) Kim Warwick (quarterfinals)
5. (United States) Victor Amaya / (United States) Hank Pfister (final)
6. (Switzerland) Heinz Günthardt / (Brazil) Cássio Motta (first round)
7. (United States) Brian Gottfried / (Mexico) Raúl Ramírez (semifinals)
8. (United States) Tim Gullikson / (United States) Tom Gullikson (semifinals)
9. (New Zealand) Chris Lewis / (Australia) Paul McNamee (first round)
10. (United States) Fritz Buehning / (United States) Johan Kriek (third round)
11. (United States) Bob Lutz / (United States) Stan Smith (first round)
12. (Poland) Wojciech Fibak / (Australia) John Fitzgerald (third round)
13. (United States) Steve Meister / (United States) Craig Wittus (third round)
14. (United States) Andy Andrews / (United States) John Sadri (first round)
15. (United States) Tim Mayotte / (United States) Tim Wilkison (first round)
16. (United Kingdom) John Lloyd / (United States) Dick Stockton (first round)

== Draw ==
=== Key ===
- Q = Qualifier
- WC = Wild card
- LL = Lucky loser
- Alt = Alternate
- ITF = ITF entry
- PR = Protected ranking
- SR = Special ranking
- SE = Special exempt
- JE = Junior exempt
- JR = Junior Accelerator Programme entrant
- CO = College Accelerator Programme entrant
- NG = Next Gen Accelerator Program entrant
- w/o = Walkover
- r = Retired
- d = Defaulted

=== Finals ===
Quarterfinals
1 | (United States) Peter Fleming (United States) John McEnroe | 6 | 6 | 3 | 1
5 | (United States) Victor Amaya (United States) Hank Pfister | 2 | 7 | 6 | 6
4 | (Australia) Mark Edmondson (Australia) Kim Warwick | 4 | 4 | 6 | 4
7 | (United States) Brian Gottfried (Mexico) Raúl Ramírez | 6 | 6 | 4 | 6
(United States) Chip Hooper (United States) Peter Rennert | 5 | 6 | 7 | 3 | 2
3 | (South Africa) Kevin Curren (United States) Steve Denton | 7 | 4 | 6 | 6 | 6
8 | (United States) Tim Gullikson (United States) Tom Gullikson | 6 | 6 | 7
(United States) Charles Strode (United States) Morris Strode | 4 | 2 | 6

Semifinals
5 | (United States) Victor Amaya (United States) Hank Pfister | 6 | 6 | 6
7 | (United States) Brian Gottfried (Mexico) Raúl Ramírez | 3 | 4 | 3
3 | (South Africa) Kevin Curren (United States) Steve Denton | 3 | 6 | 6 | 6
8 | (United States) Tim Gullikson (United States) Tom Gullikson | 6 | 3 | 2 | 4

Final
5 | (United States) Victor Amaya (United States) Hank Pfister | 2 | 7^{7} | 7 | 2 | 4
3 | (South Africa) Kevin Curren (United States) Steve Denton | 6 | 6^{4} | 5 | 6 | 6

=== Top half ===
==== Section 1 ====
First round
1 | (United States) P Fleming (United States) J McEnroe | 6 | 6
(India) A Amritraj (New Zealand) R Simpson | 3 | 2
(United States) E Fromm (United States) R Meyer | 6 | 6 | 7
(United States) A Pattison (United States) B Walts | 4 | 7 | 6
(United States) L Stefanki (United States) R Van't Hof | 7 | 6 | 6
(United States) B Cox (United States) J Hoffman | 6 | 7 | 2
(Czechoslovakia) J Granát (United States) E Iskersky | 7 | 6 | 6
16 | (United Kingdom) J Lloyd (United States) D Stockton | 6 | 7 | 2
(South Africa) T Viljoen (South Africa) D Visser | 6 | 6 | 6
11 | (United States) B Lutz (United States) S Smith | 4 | 7 | 3
(United States) L Bourne (United States) B Willenbourg | 6 | 1 | 6
(Chile) A Fillol (Chile) J Fillol | 4 | 6 | 3
(Australia) W Pascoe (Philippines) B Sison | 4 | 7 | 6
(United States) M Davis (United States) C Dunk | 6 | 6 | 2
5 | (United States) V Amaya (United States) H Pfister | 7 | 7
(Brazil) M Hocevar (Brazil) J Soares | 5 | 6

Second round
1 | (United States) P Fleming (United States) J McEnroe | 7 | 2 | 6
(United States) E Fromm (United States) R Meyer | 5 | 6 | 3
(United States) L Stefanki (United States) R Van't Hof | 6 | 3 | 5
(Czechoslovakia) J Granát (United States) E Iskersky | 2 | 6 | 7
(South Africa) T Viljoen (South Africa) D Visser | 6 | 6
(United States) L Bourne (United States) B Willenbourg | 1 | 4
(Australia) W Pascoe (Philippines) B Sison | 3 | 2
5 | (United States) V Amaya (United States) H Pfister | 6 | 6

Third round
1 | (United States) P Fleming (United States) J McEnroe | 6 | 6
(Czechoslovakia) J Granát (United States) E Iskersky | 3 | 2
(South Africa) T Viljoen (South Africa) D Visser | 5 | 4
5 | (United States) V Amaya (United States) H Pfister | 7 | 6

Quarterfinals
1 | (United States) P Fleming (United States) J McEnroe | 6 | 6 | 3 | 1
5 | (United States) V Amaya (United States) H Pfister | 2 | 7 | 6 | 6

==== Section 2 ====
First round
4 | (Australia) M Edmondson (Australia) K Warwick | 6 | 6
(United States) T Moor (United States) E Teltscher | 4 | 3
(United States) M Gandolfo (United States) R Hightower | 6 | 7
(South Africa) F Sauer (South Africa) M van der Merwe | 3 | 5
(United States) T Graham (United States) M Mitchell | 6 | 7 | 6
(United States) M Cahill (United States) J Lapidus | 7 | 6 | 2
(United States) T Delatte (United States) M Purcell | 7 | 4 | 6
9 | (New Zealand) C Lewis (Australia) P McNamee | 6 | 6 | 3
13 | (United States) S Meister (United States) C Wittus | 6 | 3 | 6
(United States) J DiLouie (New Zealand) J Simpson | 2 | 6 | 3
(Australia) B Drewett (United States) S McCain | 7 | 7
(United States) F McNair (United States) E van Dillen | 6 | 6
(Australia) J Newcombe (Australia) F Stolle | 6 | 6
(Australia) P Doohan (Australia) P Serret | 1 | 1
7 | (United States) B Gottfried (Mexico) R Ramírez | 6 | 7
(West Germany) R Gehring (United States) W Redondo | 2 | 6

Second round
4 | (Australia) M Edmondson (Australia) K Warwick | 6 | 7 | 6
(United States) M Gandolfo (United States) R Hightower | 7 | 6 | 1
(United States) T Graham (United States) M Mitchell | 6 | 2 | 1
(United States) T Delatte (United States) M Purcell | 2 | 6 | 6
13 | (United States) S Meister (United States) C Wittus | 6 | 3 | 6
(Australia) B Drewett (United States) S McCain | 2 | 6 | 4
(Australia) J Newcombe (Australia) F Stolle | 6 | 6
7 | (United States) B Gottfried (Mexico) R Ramírez | 4 | 3

Third round
4 | (Australia) M Edmondson (Australia) K Warwick | 6 | 7
(United States) T Delatte (United States) M Purcell | 4 | 6
13 | (United States) S Meister (United States) C Wittus | 7 | 6 | 5
7 | (United States) B Gottfried (Mexico) R Ramírez | 6 | 7 | 7

Quarterfinals
4 | (Australia) M Edmondson (Australia) K Warwick | 4 | 4 | 6 | 4
7 | (United States) B Gottfried (Mexico) R Ramírez | 6 | 6 | 4 | 6

=== Bottom half ===
==== Section 3 ====
First round
(United States) C Hooper (United States) P Rennert | 6 | 4 | 6
6 | (Brazil) C Motta (Switzerland) H Günthardt | 3 | 6 | 4
(United States) M Brunnberg (United States) M Dickson | 4 | 7 | 6
(United States) M de Palmer (United States) M Leach | 6 | 6 | 4
(United States) P DuPré (Paraguay) F González | 6 | 6
(United States) M Estep (United States) M Fishbach | 4 | 3
(United States) B Manson (United States) B Teacher | 5 | 7 | 6
14 | (United States) A Andrews (United States) J Sadri | 7 | 6 | 2
12 | (Poland) W Fibak (Australia) J Fitzgerald | 6 | 6
(United States) D Ralston (United States) M Riessen | 4 | 3
(United States) M Doyle (United States) C Leeds | 6 | 6
(United States) D Dowlen (Nigeria) N Odizor | 4 | 4
(Romania) I Năstase (Italy) C Panatta | 6 | 7
(United States) E Sherbeck (United States) T Waltke | 3 | 6
3 | (South Africa) K Curren (United States) S Denton | 6 | 5 | 6
(United States) R Leach (United States) T Pawsat | 2 | 7 | 1

Second round
(United States) C Hooper (United States) P Rennert | 6 | 5 | 6
(United States) M Brunnberg (United States) M Dickson | 4 | 7 | 3
(United States) P DuPré (Paraguay) F González | 4 | 4
(United States) B Manson (United States) B Teacher | 6 | 6
12 | (Poland) W Fibak (Australia) J Fitzgerald | 6 | 6
(United States) M Doyle (United States) C Leeds | 3 | 2
(Romania) I Năstase (Italy) C Panatta | 3 | 4
3 | (South Africa) K Curren (United States) S Denton | 6 | 6

Third round
(United States) C Hooper (United States) P Rennert | 5 | 6 | 6
(United States) B Manson (United States) B Teacher | 7 | 4 | 4
12 | (Poland) W Fibak (Australia) J Fitzgerald | 6 | 2
3 | (South Africa) K Curren (United States) S Denton | 7 | 6

Quarterfinals
(United States) C Hooper (United States) P Rennert | 5 | 6 | 7 | 3 | 2
3 | (South Africa) K Curren (United States) S Denton | 7 | 4 | 6 | 6 | 6

==== Section 4 ====
First round
8 | (United States) Ti Gullikson (United States) To Gullikson | 3 | 6 | 6
(Australia) P Carter (United States) N Saviano | 6 | 1 | 1
(United States) D Gitlin (United States) J Gurfein | 7 | 6
(United States) M Bauer (Australia) P Cash | 6 | 3
(United States) B Kleege (United States) B Maze | 6 | 7
(United States) R Evett (United States) G MacDonald | 3 | 5
10 | (United States) F Buehning (United States) J Kriek | 6 | 6
(Brazil) J Góes (Sweden) P Hjertquist | 2 | 4
(Israel) S Glickstein (United States) S Krulevitz | 6 | 6
15 | (United States) T Mayotte (United States) T Wilkison | 4 | 4
(Australia) B Guan (Australia) W Maher | 7 | 6
(Chile) R Acuña (Chile) JC Ayala | 5 | 4
(United States) C Strode (United States) M Strode | 4 | 6 | 6
(South Africa) E Edwards (Finland) L Palin | 6 | 4 | 1
2 | (United States) S Stewart (United States) F Taygan | 6 | 6
(United Kingdom) A Jarrett (United Kingdom) J Smith | 1 | 4

Second round
8 | (United States) Ti Gullikson (United States) To Gullikson | 4 | 7 | 6
(United States) D Gitlin (United States) J Gurfein | 6 | 6 | 4
(United States) B Kleege (United States) B Maze | 4 | 6 | 3
10 | (United States) F Buehning (United States) J Kriek | 6 | 3 | 6
(Israel) S Glickstein (United States) S Krulevitz | 6 | 6
(Australia) B Guan (Australia) W Maher | 4 | 4
(United States) C Strode (United States) M Strode | 3 | 6 | 7
2 | (United States) S Stewart (United States) F Taygan | 6 | 3 | 6

Third round
8 | (United States) Ti Gullikson (United States) To Gullikson | 3 | 6 | 6
10 | (United States) F Buehning (United States) J Kriek | 6 | 3 | 1
(Israel) S Glickstein (United States) S Krulevitz | 6 | 3 | 3
(United States) C Strode (United States) M Strode | 4 | 6 | 6

Quarterfinals
8 | (United States) Ti Gullikson (United States) To Gullikson | 6 | 6 | 7
(United States) C Strode (United States) M Strode | 4 | 2 | 6
