= 1982 US Open – Mixed doubles =

Tennis tournament

Mixed doubles
- 1982 US Open

Final
- Champions: (United States) Anne Smith (South Africa) Kevin Curren
- Runners-up: (United States) Barbara Potter (United States) Ferdi Taygan
- Score: 6–7, 7–6^{(7–4)}, 7–6^{(7–5)}

Details
- Draw: 32
- Seeds: 8

Events
Singles	men	women		boys	girls
Doubles	men	women	mixed	boys	girls
WC Singles	men	women	quad
WC Doubles	men	women	quad
Legends	men	women	mixed
- US Open

Anne Smith and Kevin Curren were the defending champions and won in the final 6–7, 7–6^{(7–4)}, 7–6^{(7–5)} against Barbara Potter and Ferdi Taygan.

== Seeds ==
Champion seeds are indicated in bold text while text in italics indicates the round in which those seeds were eliminated.

1. (United States) **Anne Smith** / (South Africa) **Kevin Curren (champions)**
2. (United States) Barbara Potter / (United States) Ferdi Taygan (final)
3. (United States) Candy Reynolds / (United States) Sherwood Stewart (semifinals)
4. (United States) JoAnne Russell / (United States) Steve Denton (first round)
5. n/a
6. (United States) Rosemary Casals / (United States) Larry Stefanki (first round)
7. (United States) Mary-Lou Piatek / (United States) Tim Gullikson (first round)
8. (United States) Pam Teeguarden / (United States) Tom Gullikson (second round)

== Draw ==
Key

- Q = Qualifier
- WC = Wild card
- LL = Lucky loser
- Alt = Alternate
- ITF = ITF entry
- PR = Protected ranking
- SR = Special ranking
- SE = Special exempt
- JE = Junior exempt
- JR = Junior Accelerator Programme entrant
- CO = College Accelerator Programme entrant
- NG = Next Gen Accelerator Program entrant
- w/o = Walkover
- r = Retired
- d = Defaulted

=== Final ===
Final
1	(United States) **Anne Smith** (South Africa) **Kevin Curren**	6	**7^{7}**	**7^{7}**
2	(United States) Barbara Potter (United States) Ferdi Taygan	**7**	6^{4}	6^{5}

=== Top half ===
First round
1	(United States) **A Smith** (South Africa) **K Curren**	**6**	4	**7**
(South Africa) R Fairbank (United States) B Nichols	3	**6**	6
(United States) K Steinmetz (United States) C Wittus	4	2
(United States) **B J King** (United States) **R Van't Hof**	**6**	**6**
(United States) **S Collins** (United States) **T Moor**	**6**	2	**7**
(Brazil) C Monteiro (Paraguay) F González	3	**6**	5
(United States) B Gadusek (United States) R Meyer	4	4
8	(United States) **P Teeguarden** (United States) **Tom Gullikson**	**6**	**6**
4	(United States) J Russell (United States) S Denton	6	**6**	4
(United States) **Z Garrison** (Australia) **P Cash**	**7**	2	**6**
(Czechoslovakia) **H Suková** (Czechoslovakia) **J Kukal**	**6**	**6**
(Socialist Federal Republic of Yugoslavia) M Jaušovec (United States) K Cullen	2	3
(United States) **B Jordan** (United States) **C Dunk**	**7**	**6**
(Brazil) P Medrado (Brazil) C Motta	6	1
(United States) **S Mascarin** (New Zealand) **C Lewis**	5	**6**	**7**
6	(United States) R Casals (United States) L Stefanki	**7**	4	6

Second round
1	(United States) **A Smith** (South Africa) **K Curren**	**6**	**6**
(United States) B J King (United States) R Van't Hof	3	3
(United States) **S Collins** (United States) **T Moor**	2	**7**	**7**
8	(United States) P Teeguarden (United States) Tom Gullikson	**6**	5	5
(United States) **Z Garrison** (Australia) **P Cash**	**6**	**6**
(Czechoslovakia) H Suková (Czechoslovakia) J Kukal	4	3
(United States) **B Jordan** (United States) **C Dunk**	**6**	5	**6**
(United States) S Mascarin (New Zealand) C Lewis	2	**7**	3

Quarterfinals
1	(United States) **A Smith** (South Africa) **K Curren**	**6**	5	**6**
(United States) S Collins (United States) T Moor	2	**7**	2
(United States) Z Garrison (Australia) P Cash	**7**	4	5
(United States) **B Jordan** (United States) **C Dunk**	5	**6**	**7**

Semifinals
1	(United States) **A Smith** (South Africa) **K Curren**	**6**	**7**
(United States) B Jordan (United States) C Dunk	1	6

=== Bottom half ===
First round
ALT	(West Germany) **B Bunge** (United States) **D Stockton**	**7**	**6**
(South Africa) T Harford (South Africa) D Visser	5	4
(United States) **L Allen** (United States) **C Strode**	**6**	**7**
(United States) W White (United States) B Cox	3	6
(United States) **P Casale** (United States) **M Bauer**	**6**	3	**7**
(United States) D Robb (United States) J Osborne	3	**6**	5
(South Africa) I Kloss (Australia) O Davidson	5	**6**	4
3	(United States) **C Reynolds** (United States) **S Stewart**	**7**	2	**6**
7	(United States) M-L Piatek (United States) Tim Gullikson	6	4
(United States) **P Smith** (United States) **M Purcell**	**7**	**6**
(United States) **S Walsh** (United States) **D Ralston**	**7**	**7**
(United States) B Herr (United States) M Davis	5	6
(United States) **A Moulton** (United States) **S Davis**	**6**	**6**
(South Africa) Y Vermaak (South Africa) S van der Merwe	1	3
(Netherlands) B Stöve (United States) M Leach	4	3
2	(United States) **B Potter** (United States) **F Taygan**	**6**	**6**

Second round
ALT	(West Germany) **B Bunge** (United States) **D Stockton**	**6**	2	**7**
(United States) L Allen (United States) C Strode	3	**6**	5
(United States) P Casale (United States) M Bauer	3	4
3	(United States) **C Reynolds** (United States) **S Stewart**	**6**	**6**
(United States) **P Smith** (United States) **M Purcell**	**6**	**6**
(United States) S Walsh (United States) D Ralston	2	4
(United States) A Moulton (United States) S Davis	2	5
2	(United States) **B Potter** (United States) **F Taygan**	**6**	**7**

Quarterfinals
ALT	(West Germany) B Bunge (United States) D Stockton	**6**	6	6
3	(United States) **C Reynolds** (United States) **S Stewart**	3	**7**	**7**
(United States) P Smith (United States) M Purcell	5	1
2	(United States) **B Potter** (United States) **F Taygan**	**7**	**6**

Semifinals
3	(United States) C Reynolds (United States) S Stewart	2	4
2	(United States) **B Potter** (United States) **F Taygan**	**6**	**6**
