= 1983 Virginia Slims of Kansas =

- Date: September 19 – 25
- Edition: 5th
- Category: Ginny Tournament Circuit
- Draw: 32S / 16D
- Prize money: $50,000
- Surface: Hard / outdoors
- Location: Kansas City, Kansas, U.S.

Champions

Singles
- (Australia) Elizabeth Sayers

Doubles
- (United States) Sandy Collins / (Australia) Elizabeth Sayers
← 1982 ·	Virginia Slims of Kansas	· 1986 →

The 1983 Virginia Slims of Kansas was a women's tennis tournament played on outdoor hard courts in Kansas City, Kansas in the United States that was part of the Ginny Tournament Circuit (Note: The 1983 Ginny Tournament Circuit consisted of eight $50,000 events played between February and September, followed by a $150,000 Ginny Championships in November. All tournaments were held in the United States) of the 1983 Virginia Slims World Championship Series. It was the fifth edition of the tournament and was held from September 19 through September 25, 1983. Elizabeth Sayers won the singles title.

== Finals ==
=== Singles ===
(Australia) Elizabeth Sayers defeated (Australia) Anne Minter 6–3, 6–1

- It was Sayers' 1st singles title of the year and the 2nd of her career.

=== Doubles ===
(United States) Sandy Collins / (Australia) Elizabeth Sayers defeated (Australia) Chris O'Neil / (Australia) Brenda Remilton 7–5, 7–7

- It was Collins' 1st career title. It was Smylie's 3rd title of the year and the 4th of her career.
