= 1985 Virginia Slims of Central New York =

- Date: August 19–25
- Edition: 8th
- Draw: 32S / 16D
- Prize money: $100,000
- Surface: Hard / outdoor
- Location: Monticello, New York, United States

Champions

Singles
- (United States) Barbara Potter

Doubles
- (Argentina) Mercedes Paz / (Argentina) Gabriela Sabatini
- Virginia Slims of Central New York

The 1985 Virginia Slims of Central New York was a women's tennis tournament played on outdoor hard courts in Monticello, New York in the United States. It was part of the 1985 WTA Tour and was played from August 19 through August 25, 1985 for one edition only. It was the first tournament in Monticello and the first in New York to feature both singles and doubles competitions. Second-seeded Barbara Potter won the singles title.

It was the 8th edition of the event played in the state of New York since 1968 where it originated as the Madison Square Garden Challenge Trophy. This event was revived as a continuation of the earlier (7th ed) Westchester Invitational, held in Harrison, New York. After being held only one time the WTA revived this event in new location Westchester, New York as the Westchester Cup in 1991.

== Finals ==
=== Singles ===
(United States) Barbara Potter defeated (Canada) Helen Kelesi 4–6, 6–3, 6–2

=== Doubles ===
(Argentina) Mercedes Paz / (Argentina) Gabriela Sabatini defeated (Czechoslovakia) Andrea Holíková / (Czechoslovakia) Kateřina Böhmová 5–7, 6–4, 6–3
