= 1982 US Open – Women's singles =

Women's singles
- 1982 US Open

Final
- Champion: (United States) Chris Evert
- Runner-up: (Czechoslovakia) Hana Mandlíková
- Score: 6–3, 6–1

Details
- Draw: 128
- Seeds: 16

Events
Singles	men	women		boys	girls
Doubles	men	women	mixed	boys	girls
WC Singles	men	women	quad
WC Doubles	men	women	quad
Legends	men	women	mixed
← 1981 ·	US Open	· 1983 →

Chris Evert defeated Hana Mandlíková in the final, 6–3, 6–1 to win the women's singles tennis title at the 1982 US Open. It was her sixth US Open title, a joint Open Era record (shared with Serena Williams), and her 13th major singles title overall.

Tracy Austin was the defending champion, but lost in the quarterfinals to Mandlíková.

== Seeds ==
The seeded players are listed below. Chris Evert is the champion; others show the round in which they were eliminated.

1. (United States) Martina Navratilova (quarterfinalist)
2. (United States) Chris Evert (champion)
3. (United States) Tracy Austin (quarterfinalist)
4. (United States) Andrea Jaeger (semifinalist)
5. (Czechoslovakia) Hana Mandlíková (finalist)
6. (Australia) Wendy Turnbull (fourth round)
7. (United States) Pam Shriver (semifinalist)
8. (West Germany) Sylvia Hanika (withdrew due to shoulder injury)
9. (West Germany) Bettina Bunge (third round)
10. (United States) Barbara Potter (second round)
11. (Socialist Federal Republic of Yugoslavia) Mima Jaušovec (second round)
12. (United States) Billie Jean King (first round)
13. (United States) Kathy Rinaldi (fourth round)
14. (Romania) Virginia Ruzici (fourth round)
15. (United States) Andrea Leand (fourth round)
16. (United States) Zina Garrison (fourth round)

Hanika's position in the draw was taken over by ninth-seeded Bunge; in turn, Bunge's position was taken over by 17th-ranked Bonnie Gadusek.

== Draw ==
=== Key ===
- Q = Qualifier
- WC = Wild card
- LL = Lucky loser
- r = Retired

=== Final eight ===
Quarterfinals
1	(United States) Martina Navratilova	6	6	2
7	(United States) Pam Shriver	1	7	6
3	(United States) Tracy Austin	6	4	4
5	(Czechoslovakia) Hana Mandlíková	4	6	6
(United States) Gretchen Rush	6	1	0
4	(United States) Andrea Jaeger	3	6	6
(United States) Bonnie Gadusek	6	1	0
2	(United States) Chris Evert	4	6	6

Semifinals
7	(United States) Pam Shriver	4	6	2
5	(Czechoslovakia) Hana Mandlíková	6	2	6
4	(United States) Andrea Jaeger	1	2
2	(United States) Chris Evert	6	6

Finals
5	(Czechoslovakia) Hana Mandlíková	3	1
2	(United States) Chris Evert	6	6

=== Earlier rounds ===
==== Section 1 ====
First round
1	(United States) Navratilova	6	6
(United States) duPont	1	1
(United States) Davis	7	6
(South Africa) Rollinson	5	3
(United States) Yeargin	6	4	6
Q	(Australia) Whytcross	4	6	3
(United States) Casals	5	6	6
(South Africa) Harford	7	4	2
Q	(United States) Ludloff	6	6
(United States) Smith	2	0
(United States) Desfor	6	6
(United States) Benjamin	2	3
(United States) Bonder	6	4	6
(West Germany) Pfaff	3	6	4
(United States) Bramblett	4	4
15	(United States) Leand	6	6

Second round
1	(United States) Navratilova	7	6
(United States) Davis	6	1
(United States) Yeargin	6	5	6
(United States) Casals	3	7	2
Q	(United States) Ludloff	6	6
(United States) Desfor	4	4
(United States) Bonder	3	6	2
15	(United States) Leand	6	2	6

Third round
1	(United States) Navratilova	6	6
(United States) Yeargin	3	3
Q	(United States) Ludloff	4	2
15	(United States) Leand	6	6

Fourth round
1	(United States) Navratilova	6	6
15	(United States) Leand	1	2

==== Section 2 ====
First round
10	(United States) Potter	7	6
(United States) Sands	6	4
(South Africa) Fairbank	5	7	7
(Czechoslovakia) Suková	7	5	6
(United States) Moulton	6	6	7
(United States) Nagelsen	7	3	5
(Peru) Arraya	6	2	6
(United States) Jordan	1	6	2
(Switzerland) Pasquale	3	6	6
(Brazil) Monteiro	6	2	4
(United States) Gilbert	3	6	6
Q	(United States) Hepner	6	3	2
(United Kingdom) Jevans	6	0	7
(United States) Acker	4	6	6
(Czechoslovakia) Skuherská	0	3
7	(United States) Shriver	6	6

Second round
10	(United States) Potter	4	1
(South Africa) Fairbank	6	6
(United States) Moulton	6	6
(Peru) Arraya	2	2
(Switzerland) Pasquale	4	5
(United States) Gilbert	6	7
(United Kingdom) Jevans	0	1
7	(United States) Shriver	6	6

Third round
(South Africa) Fairbank	6	6
(United States) Moulton	2	1
(United States) Gilbert	6	2	3
7	(United States) Shriver	3	6	6

Fourth round
(South Africa) Fairbank	3	1
7	(United States) Shriver	6	6

==== Section 3 ====
First round
3	(United States) Austin	6	4
(France) Tanvier	2	1^{r}
(United States) Norton	6	4	6
Q	(United States) Holton	2	6	2
(Italy) Simmonds	6	6
(Switzerland) Drescher	3	2
(United Kingdom) Durie	6	6
(Australia) Tobin	2	4
(United States) Herr	6	6
(United States) Gerken	2	0
(United States) Fernandez	6	6
(Hungary) Pinterová	1	4
(United States) Henricksson	5	6	6
(United States) Walsh	7	3	3
(United States) Jones	3	1
14	(Romania) Ruzici	6	6

Second round
3	(United States) Austin	7	6
(United States) Norton	6	3
(Italy) Simmonds	6	3	3
(United Kingdom) Durie	3	6	6
(United States) Herr	7	7
(United States) Fernandez	5	6
(United States) Henricksson	2	3
14	(Romania) Ruzici	6	6

Third round
3	(United States) Austin	6	6
(United Kingdom) Durie	4	3
(United States) Herr	5	2
14	(Romania) Ruzici	7	6

Fourth round
3	(United States) Austin	6	6
14	(Romania) Ruzici	1	3

==== Section 4 ====
First round
12	(United States) King	3	2
(United States) Mascarin	6	6
(United States) Nelson	3	6	6
(United States) Antonoplis	6	2	4
(United States) Kiyomura	2	6	6
(United States) Jordan	6	3	3
(Romania) Romanov	2	6	1
(United States) Gompert	6	4	1^{r}
(Bulgaria) Maleeva	6	6
(United Kingdom) Jones	3	1
(United States) Steinmetz	6	6
(United States) Casale	3	3
(United States) White	6	5	6
(France) Vanier	1	7	3
(Australia) Leo	7	3	1
5	(Czechoslovakia) Mandlíková	5	6	6

Second round
(United States) Mascarin	6	3	2
(United States) Nelson	4	6	6
(United States) Kiyomura	2	0
(Romania) Romanov	6	6
(Bulgaria) Maleeva	5	6	7
(United States) Steinmetz	7	3	5
(United States) White	6	2
5	(Czechoslovakia) Mandlíková	7	6

Third round
(United States) Nelson	6	6
(Romania) Romanov	2	2
(Bulgaria) Maleeva	2	3
5	(Czechoslovakia) Mandlíková	6	6

Fourth round
(United States) Nelson	4	2
5	(Czechoslovakia) Mandlíková	6	6

==== Section 5 ====
First round
6	(Australia) Turnbull	6	3	6
(South Africa) Mould	1	6	0
(United States) Collins	6	3	6
(United States) Lewis	3	6	1
(Argentina) Madruga	7	6
Q	(United States) Bernstein	5	1
(West Germany) Kohde	6	6
(United States) Blount	2	2
(United States) Schillig	6	6
(United States) Allen	2	4
(South Africa) Mundel	6	6
(Switzerland) Strachoňová	2	0
(United States) Rush	4	6	6
(United States) Teeguarden	6	3	2
(United States) Russell	6	6	3
11	(Socialist Federal Republic of Yugoslavia) Jaušovec	3	7	6

Second round
6	(Australia) Turnbull	7	6
(United States) Collins	6	4
(Argentina) Madruga	3	2
(West Germany) Kohde	6	6
(United States) Schillig	6	2	3
(South Africa) Mundel	4	6	6
(United States) Rush	7	2	6
11	(Socialist Federal Republic of Yugoslavia) Jaušovec	5	6	4

Third round
6	(Australia) Turnbull	7	5	6
(West Germany) Kohde	5	7	3
(South Africa) Mundel	6	3
(United States) Rush	7	6

Fourth round
6	(Australia) Turnbull	3	6	2
(United States) Rush	6	4	6

==== Section 6 ====
First round
13	(United States) Rinaldi	6	7
(Argentina) Giussani	3	5
(United States) Torres	4	6	6
(United States) Harrington	6	3	4
(United States) Reynolds	6	6
(United States) Raschiatore	1	4
(South Korea) Lee	6	4	7
(Australia) Minter	3	6	6
(United States) Louie	6	6
Q	(France) Amiach	4	1
(Hungary) Temesvári	6	7
(Czechoslovakia) Tomanová	4	5
(South Africa) Vermaak	6	6
(Sweden) Lindqvist	3	1
(Sweden) Sandin	1	1
4	(United States) Jaeger	6	6

Second round
13	(United States) Rinaldi	6	6
(United States) Torres	4	4
(United States) Reynolds	3	6
(South Korea) Lee	6	7
(United States) Louie	1	4
(Hungary) Temesvári	6	6
(South Africa) Vermaak	3	0
4	(United States) Jaeger	6	6

Third round
13	(United States) Rinaldi	6	6
(South Korea) Lee	2	1
(Hungary) Temesvári	3	2
4	(United States) Jaeger	6	6

Fourth round
13	(United States) Rinaldi	1	1
4	(United States) Jaeger	6	6

==== Section 7 ====
First round
9	(West Germany) Bunge	6	6
(United States) Solomon	1	2
(Brazil) Medrado	6	6
(United Kingdom) Coles	4	1
(United States) Burgin	7	7
Q	(Chile) Ohaco	6	5
(United States) Thompson	6	6
Q	(United Kingdom) Brasher	1	0
(Italy) Rossi	6	6
(Netherlands) Stöve	3	1
(United States) White	6	6
(United States) Preyer	3	2
(Australia) Fromholtz	6	7
(United States) Piatek	1	6
(United States) Gadusek	6	6
(United States) Neviaser	1	0

Second round
9	(West Germany) Bunge	6	6
(Brazil) Medrado	1	3
(United States) Burgin	6	6
(United States) Thompson	3	3
(Italy) Rossi	1	0
(United States) White	6	6
(Australia) Fromholtz	4	2
(United States) Gadusek	6	6

Third round
9	(West Germany) Bunge	6	6
(United States) Burgin	7	7
(United States) White	2	3
(United States) Gadusek	6	6

Fourth round
(United States) Burgin	0	0
(United States) Gadusek	6	6

==== Section 8 ====
First round
16	(United States) Garrison	7	6
(Czechoslovakia) Pazderová	6	2
(United States) Cummings	7	6
(United States) Allen	5	4
(United States) Crowe	6	6
(United States) Margolin	1	1
(United States) Hallquist	7	6
(United States) Eldredge	6	4
(Czechoslovakia) Budařová	6	6
(United States) Klitch	3	1
(United States) Latham	6	6
(United States) Forood	3	2
(United States) Henry	6	6
(United Kingdom) Wade	4	4
LL	(Peru) Vásquez	1	0
2	(United States) Evert	6	6

Second round
16	(United States) Garrison	6	6
(United States) Cummings	1	2
(United States) Crowe	7	1	7
(United States) Hallquist	6	6	6
(Czechoslovakia) Budařová	6	4	5
(United States) Latham	3	6	7
(United States) Henry	1	0
2	(United States) Evert	6	6

Third round
16	(United States) Garrison	6	7
(United States) Crowe	2	5
(United States) Latham	2	1
2	(United States) Evert	6	6

Fourth round
16	(United States) Garrison	4	3
2	(United States) Evert	6	6

Preceded by 1982 Wimbledon Championships – Women's singles	Grand Slam women's singles	Succeeded by 1982 Australian Open – Women's singles
