= 1982 US Open – Women's doubles =

Women's doubles
- 1982 US Open

Final
- Champions: (United States) Rosemary Casals (Australia) Wendy Turnbull
- Runners-up: (United States) Barbara Potter (United States) Sharon Walsh
- Score: 6–4, 6–4

Details
- Draw: 64
- Seeds: 16

Events
Singles	men	women		boys	girls
Doubles	men	women	mixed	boys	girls
WC Singles	men	women	quad
WC Doubles	men	women	quad
Legends	men	women	mixed
← 1981 ·	US Open	· 1983 →

Kathy Jordan and Anne Smith were the defending champions but lost in the quarterfinals to Bettina Bunge and Claudia Kohde-Kilsch.

Rosemary Casals and Wendy Turnbull, who lost the final of the preceding year, won this year's final 6–4, 6–4 against Barbara Potter and Sharon Walsh.

== Seeds ==
Champion seeds are indicated in bold text while text in italics indicates the round in which those seeds were eliminated.

1. (United States) Martina Navratilova / (United States) Pam Shriver (semifinals)
2. (United States) Kathy Jordan / (United States) Anne Smith (quarterfinals)
3. (United States) **Rosemary Casals** / (Australia) **Wendy Turnbull (champions)**
4. n/a
5. (United States) Barbara Potter / (United States) Sharon Walsh (final)
6. (United States) JoAnne Russell / (Romania) Virginia Ruzici (quarterfinals)
7. (United States) Leslie Allen / (Socialist Federal Republic of Yugoslavia) Mima Jaušovec (third round)
8. (West Germany) Bettina Bunge / (West Germany) Claudia Kohde-Kilsch (semifinals)
9. (United States) Candy Reynolds / (United States) Paula Smith (quarterfinals)
10. (United States) Mary-Lou Piatek / (United States) Wendy White (second round)
11. (United States) Ann Kiyomura / (Netherlands) Betty Stöve (third round)
12. (South Africa) Rosalyn Fairbank / (South Africa) Ilana Kloss (second round)
13. (Czechoslovakia) Hana Mandlíková / (Czechoslovakia) Helena Suková (third round)
14. (Brazil) Patricia Medrado / (Brazil) Cláudia Monteiro (first round)
15. (United States) Chris Evert-Lloyd / (United States) Billie Jean King (third round)
16. (South Africa) Tanya Harford / (United Kingdom) Virginia Wade (first round)

== Draw ==
=== Key ===
- Q = Qualifier
- WC = Wild card
- LL = Lucky loser
- Alt = Alternate
- SE = Special exempt
- PR = Protected ranking
- ITF = ITF entry
- JE = Junior exempt
- w/o = Walkover
- r = Retired
- d = Defaulted
- SR = Special ranking

=== Finals ===
Semifinals
1	(United States) Martina Navratilova (United States) Pam Shriver	5	**6**	4
5	(United States) **Barbara Potter** (United States) **Sharon Walsh**	**7**	2	**6**
3	(United States) **Rosemary Casals** (Australia) **Wendy Turnbull**	**6**	**6**
8	(West Germany) Bettina Bunge (West Germany) Claudia Kohde-Kilsch	4	1

Final
5	(United States) Barbara Potter (United States) Sharon Walsh	4	4
3	(United States) **Rosemary Casals** (Australia) **Wendy Turnbull**	**6**	**6**

=== Top half ===
==== Section 1 ====
First round
1	(United States) **M Navratilova** (United States) **P Shriver**	**6**	**6**
(United States) S Mascarin (United States) A White	3	4
(United States) L Bonder (South Korea) D-H Lee	4	2
(United States) **A M Fernandez** (United States) **T Lewis**	**6**	**6**
(United States) J Klitch (United States) T Mochizuki	2	2
(United States) **J Goodling** (United States) **V Nelson**	**6**	**6**
(West Germany) E Pfaff (West Germany) R Tomanová	5	0
15	(United States) **C Evert-Lloyd** (United States) **B J King**	**7**	**6**
ALT	(United States) **E Burgin** (United States) **A Moulton**	2	**7**	**6**
(United States) L Antonoplis (United States) K Jones	**6**	6	4
(United States) **P Barg** (United States) **B Herr**	4	**6**	**6**
(United Kingdom) D Jevans (New Zealand) C Newton	**6**	1	2
(Australia) **D Fromholtz** (United States) **B Gadusek**	**6**	**6**
(United States) J Filkoff (United States) D Robb	4	2
(United States) L duPont (United States) B Jordan	4	**6**	0
7	(United States) **L Allen** (Socialist Federal Republic of Yugoslavia) **M Jaušovec**	**6**	3	**6**

Second round
1	(United States) **M Navratilova** (United States) **P Shriver**	**6**	**6**
(United States) A M Fernandez (United States) T Lewis	1	4
(United States) J Goodling (United States) V Nelson	1	0
15	(United States) **C Evert-Lloyd** (United States) **B J King**	**6**	**6**
ALT	(United States) E Burgin (United States) A Moulton	3	**6**	5
(United States) **P Barg** (United States) **B Herr**	**6**	1	**7**
(Australia) D Fromholtz (United States) B Gadusek	6	1
7	(United States) **L Allen** (Socialist Federal Republic of Yugoslavia) **M Jaušovec**	**7**	**6**

Third round
1	(United States) **M Navratilova** (United States) **P Shriver**	w/o
15	(United States) C Evert-Lloyd (United States) B J King
(United States) **P Barg** (United States) **B Herr**	3	**6**	**6**
7	(United States) L Allen (Socialist Federal Republic of Yugoslavia) M Jaušovec	**6**	2	3

Quarterfinals
1	(United States) **M Navratilova** (United States) **P Shriver**	**6**	**6**
(United States) P Barg (United States) B Herr	2	2

==== Section 2 ====
First round
5	(United States) **B Potter** (United States) **S Walsh**	**6**	**6**
(Sweden) L Sandin (Czechoslovakia) K Skronská	0	2
(Poland) **I Kuczyńska** (Italy) **S Simmonds**	**6**	6	**6**
(United States) H Manset (United States) K O'Brien	3	**7**	3
(United States) **S Collins** (United States) **P Teeguarden**	**6**	**6**
(Argentina) R Giscafré (United States) A Henricksson	3	2
(United States) P Casale (United States) C Manuel	2	2
13	(Czechoslovakia) **H Mandlíková** (Czechoslovakia) **H Suková**	**6**	**6**
12	(South Africa) **R Fairbank** (South Africa) **I Kloss**	4	**6**	**7**
(United States) D Gilbert (Chile) G Ohaco	**6**	0	5
(United States) **D Desfor** (United States) **B Hallquist**	**6**	**6**
(United States) Z Garrison (United States) K Rinaldi	4	3
(South Africa) **Y Vermaak** (United States) **N Yeargin**	**7**	**6**
(United States) S Gordon (United States) J Harrington	6	2
(Peru) L Arraya (Switzerland) H Strachoňová	3	**6**	3
6	(United States) **J Russell** (Romania) **V Ruzici**	**6**	4	**6**

Second round
5	(United States) **B Potter** (United States) **S Walsh**	**6**	**6**
(Poland) I Kuczyńska (Italy) S Simmonds	2	3
(United States) S Collins (United States) P Teeguarden	5	4
13	(Czechoslovakia) **H Mandlíková** (Czechoslovakia) **H Suková**	**7**	**6**
12	(South Africa) R Fairbank (South Africa) I Kloss	4	2
(United States) **D Desfor** (United States) **B Hallquist**	**6**	**6**
(South Africa) Y Vermaak (United States) N Yeargin	4	0
6	(United States) **J Russell** (Romania) **V Ruzici**	**6**	**6**

Third round
5	(United States) **B Potter** (United States) **S Walsh**	**6**	**6**
13	(Czechoslovakia) H Mandlíková (Czechoslovakia) H Suková	2	4
(United States) D Desfor (United States) B Hallquist	**6**	4	4
6	(United States) **J Russell** (Romania) **V Ruzici**	4	**6**	**6**

Quarterfinals
5	(United States) **B Potter** (United States) **S Walsh**	**6**	**6**
6	(United States) J Russell (Romania) V Ruzici	3	2

=== Bottom half ===
==== Section 3 ====
First round
9	(United States) **C Reynolds** (United States) **P Smith**	**6**	**6**
(United States) B Bruning (United States) K Latham	2	3
(Spain) **C Perea** (Peru) **P Vásquez**	1	**7**	**6**
(Hungary) M Pinterová (United States) J Preyer	**6**	5	3
(United Kingdom) E Jones (Czechoslovakia) M Pazderová	4	0
(United Kingdom) **J Durie** (Hungary) **A Temesvári**	**6**	**6**
(United Kingdom) G Coles (Japan) N Sato	0	3
11	(United States) **A Kiyomura** (Netherlands) **B Stöve**	**6**	**6**
14	(Brazil) P Medrado (Brazil) C Monteiro	3	4
(Romania) **L Romanov** (United States) **L-A Thompson**	**6**	**6**
(United States) **L Gordon** (Italy) **P Murgo**	4	**6**	**6**
(Argentina) L Giussani (United States) P Johnson	**6**	0	3
(United States) C Copeland (United States) M Harper	1	4
(United States) **B Norton** (Australia) **E Sayers**	**6**	**6**
(United States) B Bramblett (United States) S Solomon	1	3
3	(United States) **R Casals** (Australia) **W Turnbull**	**6**	**6**

Second round
9	(United States) **C Reynolds** (United States) **P Smith**	**6**	**6**
(Spain) C Perea (Peru) P Vásquez	0	2
(United Kingdom) J Durie (Hungary) A Temesvári	5	**6**	1
11	(United States) **A Kiyomura** (Netherlands) **B Stöve**	**7**	3	**6**
(Romania) L Romanov (United States) L-A Thompson	4	**6**	4
(United States) **L Gordon** (Italy) **P Murgo**	**6**	1	**6**
(United States) B Norton (Australia) E Sayers	2	0
3	(United States) **R Casals** (Australia) **W Turnbull**	**6**	**6**

Third round
9	(United States) **C Reynolds** (United States) **P Smith**	**6**	**6**
11	(United States) A Kiyomura (Netherlands) B Stöve	1	3
(United States) L Gordon (Italy) P Murgo	1	1
3	(United States) **R Casals** (Australia) **W Turnbull**	**6**	**6**

Quarterfinals
9	(United States) C Reynolds (United States) P Smith	**6**	4	6
3	(United States) **R Casals** (Australia) **W Turnbull**	0	**6**	**7**

==== Section 4 ====
First round
8	(West Germany) **B Bunge** (West Germany) **C Kohde-Kilsch**	**6**	**6**
(United States) S Acker (United States) L Forood	2	2
(United States) A Holton (United States) K Holton	2	**6**	5
(France) **S Amiach** (France) **C Vanier**	**6**	2	**7**
(United States) N Neviaser (United States) K Steinmetz	1	6
(United States) **S McInerney** (South Africa) **B Mould**	**6**	**7**
(United States) R Blount (United States) K Sands	4	**7**	4
10	(United States) **M-L Piatek** (United States) **W White**	**6**	6	**6**
16	(South Africa) T Harford (United Kingdom) V Wade	6	**7**	6
(United States) **J Davis** (United States) **H Ludloff**	**7**	6	**7**
(Australia) **S Leo** (Australia) **P Whytcross**	**6**	**6**
(United States) P Louie (United States) S Margolin	0	3
(Czechoslovakia) **I Budařová** (Czechoslovakia) **M Skuherská**	**6**	**7**
(South Africa) J Mundel (South Africa) S Rollinson	1	5
(Australia) A Minter (Australia) A Tobin	1	6
2	(United States) **K Jordan** (United States) **A Smith**	**6**	**7**

Second round
8	(West Germany) **B Bunge** (West Germany) **C Kohde-Kilsch**	**6**	**6**
(France) S Amiach (France) C Vanier	0	3
(United States) **S McInerney** (South Africa) **B Mould**	5	**7**	**7**
10	(United States) M-L Piatek (United States) W White	**7**	6	5
(United States) **J Davis** (United States) **H Ludloff**	4	**7**	**6**
(Australia) S Leo (Australia) P Whytcross	**6**	5	3
(United States) I Budařová (Czechoslovakia) M Skuherská	**6**	3	4
2	(United States) **K Jordan** (United States) **A Smith**	0	**6**	**6**

Third round
8	(West Germany) **B Bunge** (West Germany) **C Kohde-Kilsch**	**6**	**6**
(United States) S McInerney (South Africa) B Mould	2	3
(United States) J Davis (United States) H Ludloff	2	0
2	(United States) **K Jordan** (United States) **A Smith**	**6**	**6**

Quarterfinals
8	(West Germany) **B Bunge** (West Germany) **C Kohde-Kilsch**	6	**7**	**6**
2	(United States) K Jordan (United States) A Smith	**7**	5	3
