= 1986 Virginia Slims of Kansas =

- Date: January 20–26
- Edition: 6th
- Draw: 32S / 16D
- Prize money: $75,000
- Surface: Carpet / indoor
- Location: Wichita, Kansas, U.S.
- Venue: Crestview Country Club

Champions

Singles
- (United States) Wendy White

Doubles
- (United States) Kathy Jordan (United States) Candy Reynolds
← 1983 ·	Virginia Slims of Kansas	· 1987 →

The 1986 Virginia Slims of Kansas was a women's tennis tournament played on indoor carpet courts at the Crestview Country Club in Wichita, Kansas in the United States and was part of the Category 1+ tier of the 1985 Virginia Slims World Championship Series. It was the sixth edition of the tournament and ran from January 20 through January 26, 1986. Unseeded Wendy White won the singles title and earned $12,000 first-prize money.

== Finals ==
=== Singles ===
(United States) Wendy White defeated (United States) Betsy Nagelsen 6–1, 6–7^{(5–7)}, 6–2

- It was White's only singles title of her career.

=== Doubles ===
(United States) Kathy Jordan / (United States) Candy Reynolds defeated (United States) JoAnne Russell / (United States) Anne Smith 6–3, 6–7^{(5–7)}, 6–3
