= Kevin Curren =

South African tennis player (born 1958)

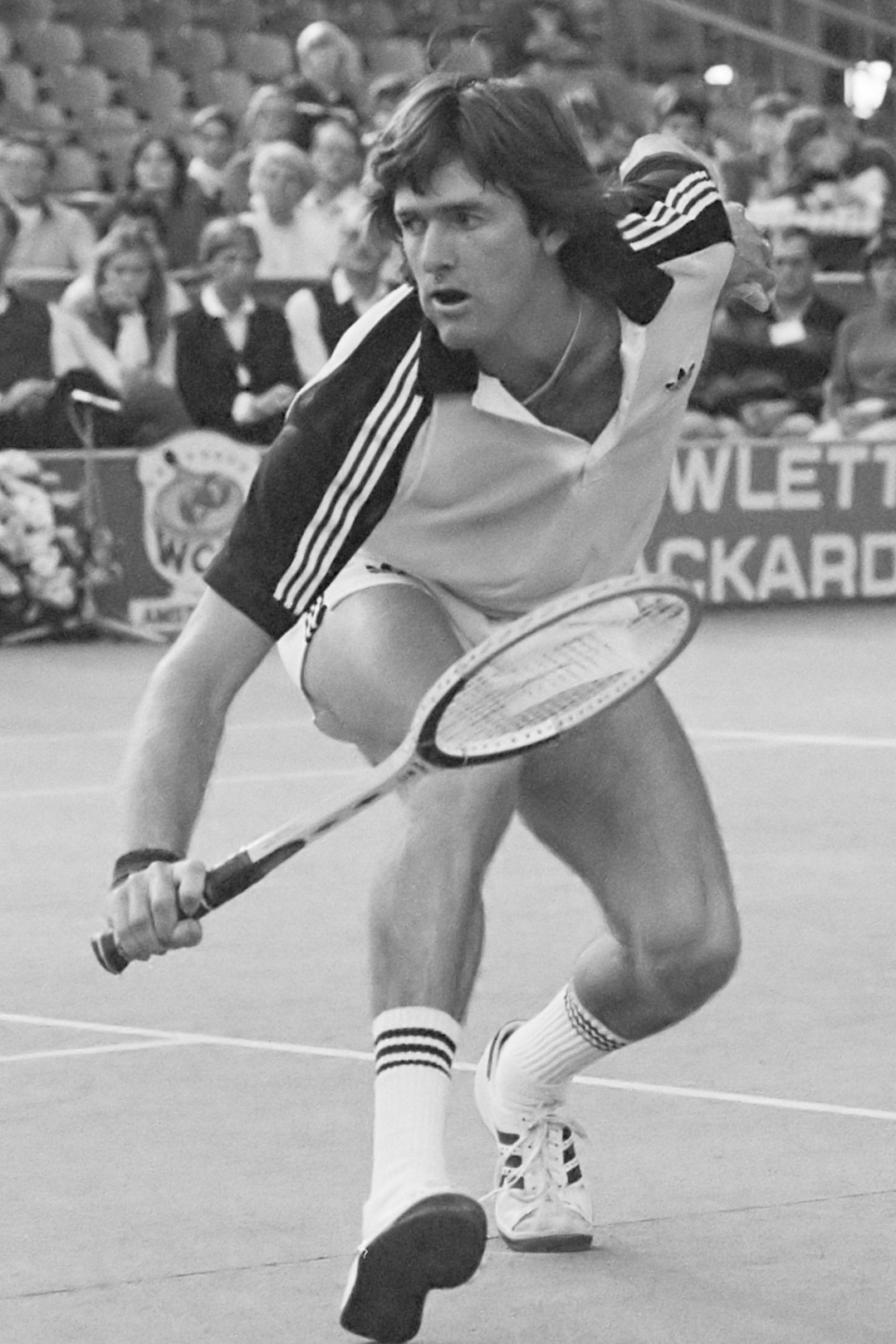
- Curren in 1982
- Country (sports): South Africa; United States (1985-)
- Residence: Austin, Texas
- Born: 2 March 1958 (age 68) Durban, Natal, South Africa
- Height: 1.85 m (6 ft 1 in)
- Turned pro: 1979
- Retired: 1993
- Plays: Right-handed (one-handed backhand)
- Prize money: $3,055,510

Singles
- Career record: 339–234 (59.1%)
- Career titles: 5
- Highest ranking: No. 5 (22 July 1985)

Grand Slam singles results
- Australian Open: F (1984)
- French Open: 2R (1992)
- Wimbledon: F (1985)
- US Open: 4R (1981, 1990)

Other tournaments
- Grand Slam Cup: 1R (1990)
- WCT Finals: SF (1984)

Doubles
- Career record: 430–249 (63.3%)
- Career titles: 26
- Highest ranking: No. 3 (3 January 1983)

Grand Slam doubles results
- Australian Open: SF (1981)
- French Open: QF (1984)
- Wimbledon: SF (1982, 1983)
- US Open: W (1982)

Mixed doubles
- Career titles: 3

Grand Slam mixed doubles results
- Wimbledon: W (1982)
- US Open: W (1981, 1982)

Kevin Melvyn Curren (born 2 March 1958) is a South African former professional tennis player. He played in two Grand Slam singles finals and won four Grand Slam doubles titles, reaching a career-high singles ranking of world No. 5 in July 1985. During his career he won 5 singles and 16 doubles titles.

== Personal life ==
Curren was born in South Africa, and he became a naturalized American citizen in April 1985.

== Tennis career ==
Curren played both tennis and cricket at Glenwood High School in Durban. He also quickly rose among the ranks as a junior at Montclair Lawn Tennis Club in Montclair, Durban. At college he played tennis for the University of Texas at Austin in the United States and won the NCAA singles title in 1979. He turned professional later that year, and won his first top-level singles title in 1981 in Johannesburg.

In 1983, Curren reached his first Grand Slam semifinal at Wimbledon and served 33 aces in beating defending champion, Jimmy Connors in the fourth round, snapping Connors' streak of 27 consecutive major quarterfinals appearances. It went on to be Connors' only 4th round loss in 35 Grand Slam tournaments appearances. Curren lost to unseeded New Zealander Chris Lewis in a five-set semifinal match which allowed Lewis to become only the seventh unseeded player to reach the Wimbledon final. In 1984, Curren played Mats Wilander in the final of the Australian Open, after beating Lendl in the fourth round and making a comeback from two sets down to defeat Ben Testerman in the semifinals. Wilander won the match, played on the grass courts at Kooyong, in four sets, returning Curren's big service well.

In 1985, after becoming an American citizen, Curren reached the final at Wimbledon with the help of coaching from Tony Roche. After defeating Larry Stefanki, Mike De Palmer, David Mustard and then future champion Stefan Edberg in the fourth round in straight sets, he eliminated the then-world No. 1, John McEnroe, in the quarterfinals. He "bewildered" world No. 3 Jimmy Connors in the semifinals, allowing him just five games. Curren was the first player to beat both American players in the same Grand Slam event. McEnroe commented that he felt overpowered. In the final, he lost in four sets to Boris Becker, in a match best remembered for making the 17-year-old Becker the youngest male Grand Slam champion (a record which was later eclipsed by Michael Chang in 1989 at the French Open). The final was intense, and Becker sent several hostile glares to Curren before and after points. On one of the final change-overs, Becker bumped Curren's shoulder as they passed one another. After his defeat, Curren was noted as saying that he thought the game would see an increase in the number of successful young players and predicted that they would have more intense, but shorter careers. Curren was the last American man to reach the final at Wimbledon until Andre Agassi did so seven years later in 1992.

He followed his second Grand Slam singles finals appearance by being upset in straight sets by Guy Forget on Grandstand court in the first round of the US Open. Frustration got the best of the fifth-seeded Curren at the post-match press conference when he commented, "I hate the city, the environment and Flushing Meadows. There is noise, the people in the grandstand are never seated and it takes an hour and a half in traffic to get here. It's sickening that with all the money they get from TV, the USTA doesn't build a better facility. The USTA should be shot. And they should drop an A-bomb on the place."

Though he never won a Grand Slam singles title, Curren did win four Grand Slam doubles titles. In 1981, he won the US Open mixed doubles, and in 1982 he won the Wimbledon mixed doubles and both men's doubles and mixed doubles at the US Open. During his career, Curren won five top-level singles titles and 26 doubles titles. His career-high rankings were world No. 5 in singles and world No. 3 in doubles. His final career singles title came in 1989 at Frankfurt, and his last doubles title was won in 1992 in Seoul. Curren retired from the professional tour in 1993.

Since retiring from the tour, Curren has served as captain of the South Africa Davis Cup team.

== Grand Slam finals ==
=== Singles: 2 (2 runner-ups) ===
Result	Year	Championship	Surface	Opponent	Score
Loss	1984	Australian Open	Grass	(Sweden) Mats Wilander	7–6^{(7–5)}, 4–6, 6–7^{(3–7)}, 2–6
Loss	1985	Wimbledon	Grass	(West Germany) Boris Becker	3–6, 7–6^{(7–4)}, 6–7^{(3–7)}, 4–6

=== Doubles: 1 (1 title) ===
Result	Year	Championship	Surface	Partner	Opponents	Score
Win	1982	US Open	Hard	(United States) Steve Denton	(United States) Victor Amaya (United States) Hank Pfister	6–2, 6–7^{(4–7)}, 5–7, 6–2, 6–4

=== Mixed doubles: 3 (3 titles) ===
Result	Year	Championship	Surface	Partner	Opponents	Score
Win	1981	US Open	Hard	(United States) Anne Smith	(United States) JoAnne Russell (United States) Steve Denton	6–4, 7–6
Win	1982	Wimbledon	Grass	(United States) Anne Smith	(Australia) Wendy Turnbull (United Kingdom) John Lloyd	2–6, 6–3, 7–5
Win	1982	US Open	Hard	(United States) Anne Smith	(United States) Barbara Potter (United States) Ferdi Taygan	6–7, 7–6^{(7–4)}, 7–6^{(7–5)}

== ATP career finals ==
=== Singles: 13 (5 titles / 8 runner-ups) ===
Result	W/L	Date	Tournament	Surface	Opponent	Score
Win	1–0	Apr 1981	Johannesburg, South Africa	Hard	(South Africa) Bernard Mitton	6–4, 6–4
Loss	1–1	Sep 1982	Los Angeles-2 WCT, U.S.	Carpet (i)	(Czechoslovakia) Ivan Lendl	6–7^{(5–7)}, 5–7, 1–6
Loss	1–2	Oct 1982	Amsterdam WCT, Netherlands	Carpet (i)	(Poland) Wojciech Fibak	5–7, 6–3, 4–6, 3–6
Win	2–2	Nov 1982	Cologne, West Germany	Carpet (i)	(Israel) Shlomo Glickstein	2–6, 6–2, 6–3
Loss	2–3	Mar 1983	Milan, Italy	Carpet (i)	(Czechoslovakia) Ivan Lendl	7–5, 3–6, 6–7^{(4–7)}
Loss	2–4	Dec 1984	Australian Open, Melbourne	Grass	(Sweden) Mats Wilander	7–6^{(7–5)}, 4–6, 6–7^{(3–7)}, 2–6
Win	3–4	Feb 1985	Toronto, Canada	Carpet (i)	(Sweden) Anders Järryd	7–6^{(8–6)}, 6–3
Loss	3–5	Mar 1985	Houston WCT, U.S.	Carpet (i)	(United States) John McEnroe	5–7, 1–6, 6–7^{(4–7)}
Loss	3–6	Jul 1985	Wimbledon, U.K.	Grass	(West Germany) Boris Becker	3–6, 7–6^{(7–4)}, 6–7^{(3–7)}, 4–6
Win	4–6	Apr 1986	Atlanta, U.S.	Carpet (i)	(United States) Tim Wilkison	7–6^{(7–5)}, 7–6^{(7–2)}
Loss	4–7	Oct 1986	Scottsdale, U.S.	Hard	(United States) John McEnroe	3–6, 6–3, 2–6
Loss	4–8	Aug 1988	Toronto, Canada	Hard	(Czechoslovakia) Ivan Lendl	6–7^{(10–12)}, 2–6
Win	5–8	Oct 1989	Frankfurt, West Germany	Carpet (i)	(Czechoslovakia) Petr Korda	6–2, 7–5

=== Doubles: 53 (26 titles / 27 runner-ups) ===
Result	No.	Date	Tournament	Surface	Partner	Opponents	Score
Win	1.	1980	Denver, U.S.	Carpet (i)	(United States) Steve Denton	(Poland) Wojciech Fibak (Switzerland) Heinz Günthardt	7–5, 6–2
Loss	1.	1980	Washington D.C., U.S.	Carpet (i)	(United States) Steve Denton	(United States) Ferdi Taygan (United States) Brian Teacher	6–4, 3–6, 6–7
Loss	2.	1980	North Conway, U.S.	Clay	(United States) Steve Denton	(United States) Jimmy Connors (United States) Brian Gottfried	6–7, 3–6
Win	2.	1980	Indianapolis, U.S.	Clay	(United States) Steve Denton	(Poland) Wojciech Fibak (Czechoslovakia) Ivan Lendl	3–6, 7–6, 6–4
Win	3.	1980	Basel, Switzerland	Hard (i)	(United States) Steve Denton	(South Africa) Bob Hewitt (South Africa) Frew McMillan	6–7, 6–4, 6–4
Win	4.	1981	Monterrey WCT, Mexico	Carpet (i)	(United States) Steve Denton	(South Africa) Johan Kriek (New Zealand) Russell Simpson	7–6, 6–3
Loss	3.	1981	Brussels, Belgium	Carpet (i)	(United States) Steve Denton	(United States) Sandy Mayer (South Africa) Frew McMillan	6–4, 3–6, 3–6
Loss	4.	1981	Queen's Club, U.K.	Grass	(United States) Steve Denton	(United States) Pat DuPré (United States) Brian Teacher	6–3, 6–7, 9–11
Loss	5.	1981	Newport, U.S.	Grass	(United States) Billy Martin	(Australia) Brad Drewett (United States) Erik van Dillen	2–6, 4–6
Win	5.	1981	Indianapolis, U.S.	Clay	(United States) Steve Denton	(Mexico) Raúl Ramírez (United States) Van Winitsky	6–3, 5–7, 7–5
Win	6.	1981	Stockholm, Sweden	Hard (i)	(United States) Steve Denton	(United States) Sherwood Stewart (United States) Ferdi Taygan	6–7, 6–4, 6–0
Loss	6.	1982	Masters Doubles WCT, London	Carpet (i)	(United States) Steve Denton	(Switzerland) Heinz Günthardt (Hungary) Balázs Taróczy	7–6, 3–6, 5–7, 4–6
Win	7.	1982	Denver, U.S.	Carpet (i)	(United States) Steve Denton	(Australia) Phil Dent (Australia) Kim Warwick	6–4, 6–4
Win	8.	1982	Memphis, U.S.	Hard (i)	(United States) Steve Denton	(United States) Peter Fleming (United States) John McEnroe	7–6, 4–6, 6–2
Loss	7.	1982	Munich WCT, West Germany	Carpet (i)	(United States) Steve Denton	(Australia) Mark Edmondson (Czechoslovakia) Tomáš Šmíd	6–4, 5–7, 2–6
Loss	8.	1982	Rotterdam, Netherlands	Carpet (i)	(United States) Fritz Buehning	(Australia) Mark Edmondson (United States) Sherwood Stewart	5–7, 2–6
Win	9.	1982	Houston, U.S.	Clay	(United States) Steve Denton	(Australia) Mark Edmondson (Australia) Peter McNamara	7–5, 6–4
Win	10.	1982	US Open, New York	Hard	(United States) Steve Denton	(United States) Victor Amaya (United States) Hank Pfister	6–2, 6–7, 5–7, 6–2, 6–4
Win	11.	1982	Los Angeles-2 WCT, U.S.	Carpet (i)	(United States) Hank Pfister	(United States) Andy Andrews (United States) Drew Gitlin	4–6, 6–2, 7–5
Loss	9.	1982	Amsterdam WCT, Netherlands	Carpet (i)	(United Kingdom) Buster Mottram	(United States) Fritz Buehning (Czechoslovakia) Tomáš Šmíd	6–4, 3–6, 0–6
Win	12.	1983	Philadelphia, U.S.	Carpet (i)	(United States) Steve Denton	(United States) Peter Fleming (United States) John McEnroe	6–4, 7–6
Win	13.	1983	Munich WCT, West Germany	Carpet (i)	(United States) Steve Denton	(Switzerland) Heinz Günthardt (Hungary) Balázs Taróczy	7–5, 2–6, 6–1
Win	14.	1983	Houston WCT, U.S.	Clay	(United States) Steve Denton	(United States) Mark Dickson (Czechoslovakia) Tomáš Šmíd	7–6, 6–7, 6–1
Win	15.	1983	Las Vegas, U.S.	Hard	(United States) Steve Denton	(United States) Tracy Delatte (United States) Johan Kriek	6–3, 7–5
Loss	10.	1983	Forest Hills WCT, U.S.	Clay	(United States) Steve Denton	(United States) Tracy Delatte (United States) Johan Kriek	7–6, 5–7, 3–6
Loss	11.	1983	Queen's Club, U.K.	Grass	(United States) Steve Denton	(United States) Brian Gottfried (Australia) Paul McNamee	4–6, 3–6
Loss	12.	1984	Richmond WCT, U.S.	Carpet (i)	(United States) Steve Denton	(United States) John McEnroe (United States) Patrick McEnroe	6–7, 2–6
Loss	13.	1984	Brussels, Belgium	Carpet (i)	(United States) Steve Denton	(United States) Tim Gullikson (United States) Tom Gullikson	4–6, 7–6, 6–7
Win	16.	1984	Rotterdam, Netherlands	Carpet (i)	(Poland) Wojciech Fibak	(United States) Fritz Buehning (United States) Ferdi Taygan	6–4, 6–4
Loss	14.	1984	Milan, Italy	Carpet (i)	(United States) Steve Denton	(Czechoslovakia) Pavel Složil (Czechoslovakia) Tomáš Šmíd	4–6, 3–6
Loss	15.	1985	Memphis, U.S.	Hard (i)	(United States) Steve Denton	(Czechoslovakia) Pavel Složil (Czechoslovakia) Tomáš Šmíd	6–1, 3–6, 4–6
Loss	16.	1985	Brussels, Belgium	Carpet (i)	(Poland) Wojciech Fibak	(Sweden) Stefan Edberg (Sweden) Anders Järryd	3–6, 6–7
Win	17.	1986	Queen's Club, U.K.	Grass	(France) Guy Forget	(Australia) Darren Cahill (Australia) Mark Kratzmann	6–2, 7–6
Win	18.	1987	Tokyo Outdoor, Japan	Hard	(United States) Paul Annacone	(Ecuador) Andrés Gómez (Sweden) Anders Järryd	6–4, 7–6
Win	19.	1987	Los Angeles, U.S.	Hard	(United States) David Pate	(United States) Brad Gilbert (United States) Tim Wilkison	6–3, 6–4
Win	20.	1987	Johannesburg, South Africa	Hard (i)	(United States) David Pate	(United States) Eric Korita (United States) Brad Pearce	6–4, 6–4
Win	21.	1988	Memphis, U.S.	Hard (i)	(United States) David Pate	(Sweden) Peter Lundgren (Sweden) Mikael Pernfors	6–2, 6–2
Loss	17.	1988	Philadelphia, U.S.	Carpet (i)	(South Africa) Danie Visser	(New Zealand) Kelly Evernden (United States) Johan Kriek	6–7, 3–6
Loss	18.	1988	Vienna, Austria	Carpet (i)	(Czechoslovakia) Tomáš Šmíd	(Austria) Alex Antonitsch (Hungary) Balázs Taróczy	6–4, 3–6, 6–7
Win	22.	1988	Stockholm, Sweden	Hard (i)	(United States) Jim Grabb	(United States) Paul Annacone (Australia) John Fitzgerald	7–5, 7–5
Win	23.	1988	Johannesburg, South Africa	Hard (i)	(United States) David Pate	(South Africa) Gary Muller (United States) Tim Wilkison	7–6, 6–4
Loss	19.	1989	Indian Wells, U.S.	Hard	(United States) David Pate	(West Germany) Boris Becker (Switzerland) Jakob Hlasek	6–3, 3–6, 4–6
Loss	20.	1989	Tokyo Outdoor, Japan	Hard	(United States) David Pate	(United States) Ken Flach (United States) Robert Seguso	4–6, 4–6
Win	24.	1989	Tokyo Indoor, Japan	Carpet (i)	(United States) David Pate	(Ecuador) Andrés Gómez (Socialist Federal Republic of Yugoslavia) Slobodan Živojinović	4–6, 6–3, 7–6
Loss	21.	1989	Frankfurt, West Germany	Carpet (i)	(West Germany) Eric Jelen	(South Africa) Pieter Aldrich (South Africa) Danie Visser	6–7, 7–6, 3–6
Loss	22.	1989	Wembley, U.K.	Carpet (i)	(United Kingdom) Jeremy Bates	(Switzerland) Jakob Hlasek (United States) John McEnroe	1–6, 6–7
Loss	23.	1990	Toronto Indoor, Canada	Carpet (i)	(South Africa) Neil Broad	(United States) Patrick Galbraith (Australia) David Macpherson	6–2, 4–6, 3–6
Loss	24.	1990	Hong Kong, UK	Hard	(United States) Joey Rive	(Australia) Pat Cash (Australia) Wally Masur	3–6, 3–6
Win	25.	1990	Queen's Club, U.K.	Grass	(United Kingdom) Jeremy Bates	(France) Henri Leconte (Czechoslovakia) Ivan Lendl	6–2, 7–6
Loss	25.	1990	West Berlin, West Germany	Carpet (i)	(United States) Patrick Galbraith	(South Africa) Pieter Aldrich (South Africa) Danie Visser	6–7, 6–7
Loss	26.	1991	Lyon, France	Hard (i)	(United Kingdom) Jeremy Bates	(United States) Steve DeVries (Australia) David Macpherson	6–7, 6–3, 3–6
Loss	27.	1992	Memphis, U.S.	Hard (i)	(South Africa) Gary Muller	(Australia) Todd Woodbridge (Australia) Mark Woodforde	5–7, 6–4, 6–7
Win	26.	1992	Seoul, South Korea	Hard	(South Africa) Gary Muller	(New Zealand) Kelly Evernden (United States) Brad Pearce	7–6, 6–4

== Grand Slam singles performance timeline ==
Key
W	F	SF	QF	#R	RR	Q#	DNQ	A	NH

(W) winner; (F) finalist; (SF) semifinalist; (QF) quarterfinalist; (#R) rounds 4, 3, 2, 1; (RR) round-robin stage; (Q#) qualification round; (DNQ) did not qualify; (A) absent; (NH) not held; (SR) strike rate (events won / competed); (W–L) win–loss record.

	South Africa							United States									
Tournament	1978	1979	1980	1981	1982	1983	1984	1985	1986	1987	1988	1989	1990	1991	1992	SR	W–L
Australian Open	A	A	A	2R	A	A	F	A	NH	3R	A	A	A	A	A	0 / 3	9–3
French Open	A	A	A	A	A	A	A	A	A	A	A	A	A	A	2R	0 / 1	1–1
Wimbledon	A	A	4R	2R	3R	SF	4R	F	1R	2R	1R	3R	QF	2R	1R	0 / 13	28–13
US Open	2R	2R	A	4R	1R	A	2R	1R	2R	A	2R	A	4R	2R	1R	0 / 11	12–11
Win–loss	1–1	1–1	3–1	5–3	2–2	5–1	10–3	6–2	1–2	3–2	1–2	2–1	7–2	2–2	1–3	0 / 28	50–28
