= Victor Amaya =

American tennis player

- Country (sports): United States
- Residence: Grand Rapids, Michigan, U.S.
- Born: July 2, 1954 (age 71) Denver, Colorado, U.S.
- Height: 6 ft 7 in (2.01 m)
- Turned pro: 1973
- Retired: 1984
- Plays: Left-handed (one-handed backhand)
- Prize money: $694,304

Singles
- Career record: 186–173
- Career titles: 3
- Highest ranking: No. 15 (August 4, 1980)

Grand Slam singles results
- Australian Open: SF (1979)
- French Open: 3R (1976, 1979)
- Wimbledon: 3R (1981)
- US Open: 3R (1977, 1979, 1980)

Doubles
- Career record: 193–170
- Career titles: 6
- Highest ranking: No. 16 (January 3, 1983)

Victor Amaya (born July 2, 1954) is a retired tennis player from the U.S.

The left-handed Amaya's career-high singles ranking was world No. 15, attained in August 1980. During his career he won three ATP singles titles and six doubles titles, including the 1980 French Open doubles title with partner Hank Pfister. With Pfister he was runner-up in doubles at the 1982 US Open.

One of Amaya's memorable matches was a loss to Björn Borg in the first round of the 1978 Wimbledon Championships. With his 135 mph serve, he led Borg two sets to one and was up a break in the fourth set, but ultimately lost in five sets. After the match Borg, who was the defending champion and seeded first, commented “It was his match, if he wins one point for 4‐1 and two breaks, he doesn't lose the match.”.

He played college tennis at the University of Michigan and was inducted into the USTA/Midwest Hall of Fame in 2016.

== Career finals ==
=== Singles (3 titles, 5 runner-ups) ===
Result	W-L	Date	Tournament	Surface	Opponent	Score
Win	1–0	Jan 1977	Adelaide, Australia	Grass	(United States) Brian Teacher	6–1, 6–4
Loss	1–1	Aug 1978	New Orleans, U.S.	Carpet	(United States) Roscoe Tanner	3–6, 5–7
Loss	1–2	Feb 1979	Denver, U.S.	Carpet	(Poland) Wojciech Fibak	4–6, 1–6
Win	2–2	Jun 1979	Surbiton, U.K.	Grass	(Australia) Mark Edmondson	6–4, 7–5
Loss	2–3	Feb 1980	Denver, U.S.	Carpet	(United States) Gene Mayer	2–6, 2–6
Win	3–3	Mar 1980	Washington, D.C., U.S.	Carpet	(Czechoslovakia) Ivan Lendl	6–7, 6–4, 7–5
Loss	3–4	Apr 1980	Johannesburg, South Africa	Hard	(Switzerland) Heinz Günthardt	4–6, 4–6
Loss	3–5	Aug 1980	Cleveland, U.S.	Hard	(United States) Gene Mayer	2–6, 1–6

=== Doubles (6 titles, 7 runner-ups) ===
Result	W-L	Date	Tournament	Surface	Partner	Opponents	Score
Loss	0–1	Jul 1978	Louisville, U.S.	Clay	(Australia) John James	(Poland) Wojciech Fibak (Paraguay) Víctor Pecci	4–6, 7–6, 4–6
Loss	0–2	Aug 1979	Lafayette, U.S.	Clay	(United States) Eric Friedler	(United States) Marty Riessen (United States) Sherwood Stewart	4–6, 4–6
Win	1–2	Jun 1980	French Open, Paris	Clay	(United States) Hank Pfister	(United States) Brian Gottfried (Mexico) Raúl Ramírez	1–6, 6–4, 6–4, 6–3
Loss	1–3	Oct 1980	Maui, U.S.	Hard	(United States) Hank Pfister	(United States) Peter Fleming (United States) John McEnroe	6–7, 7–6, 2–6
Win	2–3	Nov 1980	Tokyo Indoor, Japan	Carpet	(United States) Hank Pfister	(United States) Marty Riessen (United States) Sherwood Stewart	6–3, 3–6, 7–6
Loss	2–4	Jan 1981	Masters Doubles WCT, London	Carpet	(United States) Hank Pfister	(Australia) Peter McNamara (Australia) Paul McNamee	3–6, 6–2, 6–3, 3–6, 2–6
Win	3–4	Oct 1981	Tokyo Indoor, Japan	Carpet	(United States) Hank Pfister	(Switzerland) Heinz Günthardt (Hungary) Balázs Taróczy	6–4, 6–2
Win	4–4	Feb 1982	Monterrey, Mexico	Carpet	(United States) Hank Pfister	(United States) Tracy Delatte (United States) Mel Purcell	6–3, 6–7, 6–3
Loss	4–5	Jun 1982	London/Queen's Club, U.K.	Grass	(United States) Hank Pfister	(United States) John McEnroe (United States) Peter Rennert	6–7, 5–7
Loss	4–6	Aug 1982	Columbus, U.S.	Carpet	(United States) Hank Pfister	(United States) Tim Gullikson (South Africa) Bernard Mitton	6–4, 1–6, 4–6
Win	5–6	Aug 1982	Cleveland, U.S.	Hard	(United States) Hank Pfister	(United States) Matt Mitchell (United States) Craig Wittus	6–4, 7–6
Loss	5–7	Sep 1982	U.S. Open, New York	Hard	(United States) Hank Pfister	(South Africa) Kevin Curren (United States) Steve Denton	2–6, 7–6, 7–5, 2–6, 4–6
Win	6–7	Aug 1983	Cincinnati, U.S.	Hard	(United States) Tim Gullikson	(Brazil) Carlos Kirmayr (Brazil) Cássio Motta	6–4, 6–3
