= Tom Gullikson =

American tennis player and coach

- Country (sports): United States
- Born: September 8, 1951 (age 75) La Crosse, Wisconsin, U.S.
- Height: 5 ft 11 in (1.80 m)
- Turned pro: 1976
- Retired: 1987
- Plays: Left-handed (1-handed backhand)
- Prize money: $889,492

Singles
- Career record: 217–225
- Career titles: 1
- Highest ranking: No. 34 (April 30, 1984)

Grand Slam singles results
- Australian Open: 3R (1983, 1984)
- French Open: 3R (1977)
- Wimbledon: 3R (1978, 1979, 1984, 1985)
- US Open: QF (1982)

Doubles
- Career record: 293–226
- Career titles: 15
- Highest ranking: No. 4 (September 12, 1983)

Grand Slam doubles results
- Australian Open: SF (1983)
- French Open: 3R (1977, 1978, 1979, 1980)
- Wimbledon: F (1983)
- US Open: SF (1982)

Grand Slam mixed doubles results
- US Open: W (1984)

Tom Gullikson (born September 8, 1951) is a tennis coach and former professional tennis player born in La Crosse, Wisconsin and raised in Onalaska, Wisconsin in the United States.

== Career ==
During his career as a player, Gullikson won 15 ATP recognized doubles titles, ten of them partnering with his identical twin brother, Tim Gullikson, who was also a noted coach. Tim coached the then number one player in the world Pete Sampras before Tim was diagnosed with brain cancer in 1995, and died in 1996. The brothers were runners-up in the doubles competition at Wimbledon in 1983. Gullikson also won the mixed doubles title at the US Open in 1984, with Manuela Maleeva.

Gullikson's best performance at a Grand Slam came when he got to the quarter-finals of the 1982 US Open, defeating John Alexander, Jérôme Potier, Chip Hooper and Jaime Fillol before losing to Guillermo Vilas.

Gullikson played compatriot John McEnroe during the first round of the 1981 Wimbledon championships, when the latter got into a verbal altercation with the umpire over a serve ruled out, during which he uttered his infamous "You cannot be serious!" exclamation. During the verbal exchange with the umpire, McEnroe indirectly referenced Gullikson stating "He's [Gullikson] walking over" implying that Gullikson also assumed McEnroe's serve was good by walking to the other side of the court in anticipation of the next point.

Gullikson won one top-level singles title (at Newport in 1985). His career-high rankings were world No. 34 in singles and world No. 4 in doubles (in 1984 and 1983 respectively). He retired from the professional tour in 1987.

After retiring as a player, he became one of the original members of the United States Tennis Association Player Development Program, coaching players such as Todd Martin, Jennifer Capriati and Andy Roddick. He served as Director of Coaching for the program from 1997 to 2001.

Gullikson was the United States Davis Cup Captain from 1994 to 1999. He captained the teams that won the Davis Cup in 1995 and were runners-up in 1997. In 1996, Gullikson was coach of the US men's Olympic tennis team, and guided Andre Agassi to winning the Olympic Gold Medal in Atlanta.

From December 2001 to February 2002, Gullikson coached Pete Sampras.

== Grand Slam finals ==
=== Doubles (1 runner-up) ===
Result	Year	Championship	Surface	Partner	Opponents	Score
Loss	1983	Wimbledon	Grass	(United States) Tim Gullikson	(United States) Peter Fleming (United States) John McEnroe	4–6, 3–6, 4–6

=== Mixed doubles (1 title) ===
Result	Year	Championship	Surface	Partner	Opponents	Score
Win	1984	US Open	Hard	(Bulgaria) Manuela Maleeva	(Australia) Elizabeth Sayers (Australia) John Fitzgerald	2–6, 7–5, 6–4
