= Barbara Potter =

American tennis player

- Country (sports): United States
- Residence: Harlem, Georgia, USA
- Born: October 22, 1961 (age 64) Waterbury, Connecticut, U.S.
- Height: 1.75 m (5 ft 9 in)
- Turned pro: 1978
- Retired: 1989
- Plays: Left-handed
- Prize money: US$ 1,313,808

Singles
- Career record: 320–191
- Career titles: 6
- Highest ranking: No. 7 (December 6, 1982)

Grand Slam singles results
- Australian Open: QF (1984)
- French Open: 1R (1985)
- Wimbledon: QF (1982, 1983, 1985)
- US Open: SF (1981)

Doubles
- Career record: 200–74
- Career titles: 19
- Highest ranking: No. 3

Grand Slam doubles results
- Australian Open: SF (1982, 1983, 1984, 1985, 1988)
- Wimbledon: SF (1983, 1984)
- US Open: F (1982)

Grand Slam mixed doubles results
- US Open: F (1982, 1983)

Barbara Potter (born October 22, 1961) is a former tennis player from the United States, who competed professionally on the WTA Tour between 1978 and 1989, winning six singles titles and 19 doubles titles. Her highest singles ranking was No. 7 in December 1982.

== Career ==
Potter started playing tennis when she was eight years old. After graduating from Taft School in Watertown, Connecticut in 1978 Potter elected to turn professional instead of accepting an offer of admission at Princeton. A left-hander, she reached the semifinals at the U.S. Open in 1981 as well as the quarterfinals at the Australian Open in 1984, and Wimbledon in 1982, 1983 and 1985. At the WTA Tour Championships, she reached the semifinals in singles in 1984 and was a runner-up in doubles with Sharon Walsh in 1981.

Potter reached a career high ranking of No. 7 in 1982 and that year won the singles titles at the Avon Championships of Cincinnati and the US Indoor Championships. She also played in three Grand Slam doubles finals, the 1982 US Open women's doubles with Sharon Walsh as well as the 1982 and 1983 US Open mixed doubles with Ferdi Taygan.

In 1986, Potter suffered two herniated disks in her back at a tournament in England and was forced off the tour several times. After a grueling exercise and fitness program, she successfully returned to the tour.

She was a member of the 1982 and 1984 U.S. Wightman Cup teams and the 1988 United States Fed Cup team. In 1989, she re-aggravated a persistent back condition at the beginning season when she was involved in an automobile accident. She retired in November 1989 due to deteriorating hip cartilage.

Potter currently resides in Harlem, Georgia.

== Major finals ==
=== Grand Slam finals ===
==== Doubles (1 runner–up) ====
Result	Year	Championship	Surface	Partner	Opponents	Score
Loss	1982	US Open	Hard	(United States) Sharon Walsh	(United States) Kathy Jordan (United States) Anne Smith	6–4, 6–4

==== Mixed doubles (2 runners-up) ====
Result	Year	Championship	Surface	Partner	Opponents	Score
Loss	1982	US Open	Hard	(United States) Ferdi Taygan	(United States) Anne Smith (South Africa) Kevin Curren	6–7^{(4–7)}, 7–6^{(7–4)}, 7–6^{(7–5)}
Loss	1983	US Open	Hard	(United States) Ferdi Taygan	(Australia) Elizabeth Sayers (Australia) John Fitzgerald	3–6, 6–3, 6–4

=== Year-End Championships finals ===
==== Doubles: (1 runner–up) ====
Result	Year	Championship	Surface	Partner	Opponents	Score
Loss	1981	New York City	Carpet (i)	(United States) Sharon Walsh	(Czechoslovakia) Martina Navrátilová (United States) Pam Shriver	6–0, 7–6^{(8–6)}

== WTA career finals ==
=== Singles: 14 (6–8) ===
Winner — Legend Grand Slam tournaments (0–0) WTA Tour Championships (0–0) Tier I (0–0) Tier II (0–0) Tier III (1–0) Tier IV (0–1) Tier V (0–1) Virginia Slims, Avon, Other (5–6)	Titles by surface Hard (2–2) Grass (0–1) Clay (0–0) Carpet (4–5)

Result	W/L	Date	Tournament	Surface	Opponent	Score
Win	1.	Jan 1979	Toronto, Canada	Carpet (i)	(West Germany) Bettina Bunge	6–1, 6–4
Loss	1.	Jan 1980	Las Vegas, US	Hard (i)	(United States) Andrea Jaeger	6–7, 6–4, 1–6
Loss	2.	Feb 1981	Seattle, US	Carpet (i)	(West Germany) Sylvia Hanika	2–6, 4–6
Win	2.	Jan 1982	Cincinnati, US	Carpet (i)	(West Germany) Bettina Bunge	6–2, 7–6^{(7–3)}
Loss	3.	Feb 1982	Kansas City, US	Carpet (i)	(United States) Martina Navratilova	2–6, 2–6
Loss	4.	Sep 1982	Tokyo, Japan	Carpet (i)	(West Germany) Bettina Bunge	6–7^{(4–7)}, 2–6
Win	3.	Sep 1982	Philadelphia, US	Carpet (i)	(United States) Pam Shriver	6–4, 6–2
Loss	5.	Feb 1984	Chicago, US	Carpet (i)	(United States) Pam Shriver	6–7^{(4–7)}, 6–2, 3–6
Win	4.	Aug 1985	Monticello, US	Hard	(Canada) Helen Kelesi	4–6, 6–3, 6–2
Win	5.	Feb 1987	Wichita, US	Carpet (i)	(Soviet Union) Larisa Savchenko	7–6^{(8–6)}, 7–6^{(7–5)}
Loss	6.	Mar 1987	Washington, US	Carpet (i)	(Czechoslovakia) Hana Mandlíková	4–6, 2–6
Loss	7.	Jul 1988	Newport, US	Grass	(United States) Lori McNeil	4–6, 6–4, 3–6
Win	6.	Aug 1988	Cincinnati, US	Hard	(Canada) Helen Kelesi	6–2, 6–2
Loss	8.	Feb 1989	Wichita, US	Hard (i)	(United States) Amy Frazier	6–4, 4–6, 0–6

=== Doubles: 41 (19–22) ===
Winner — Legend Grand Slam tournaments (0–1) WTA Tour Championships (0–1) Tier I (0–0) Tier II (0–0) Tier III (0–0) Tier IV (1–0) Tier V (0–0) Virginia Slims, Avon, Other (18–20)	Titles by surface Hard (3–5) Grass (3–0) Clay (1–1) Carpet (12–16)

Result	W/L	Date	Tournament	Surface	Partner	Opponents	Score
Loss	1.	Aug 1978	Mahwah	Hard	(Australia) Pam Whytcross	(South Africa) Ilana Kloss (South Africa) Marise Kruger	3–6, 4–6
Win	1.	Jan 1980	Las Vegas	Hard (i)	(United States) Kay McDaniel	(United States) Diane Desfor (United States) Barbara Jordan	4–5, 7–6, 6–4
Win	2.	Sep 1980	Atlanta	Carpet (i)	(United States) Sharon Walsh	(United States) Kathy Jordan (United States) Anne Smith	6–3, 6–1
Win	3.	Dec 1980	Tucson	Carpet (i)	(United States) Leslie Allen	(United States) Mary-Lou Piatek (United States) Wendy White	7–6, 6–0
Win	4.	Jan 1981	Kansas City	Carpet (i)	(United States) Sharon Walsh	(United States) Rosie Casals (Australia) Wendy Turnbull	6–2, 7–6^{(7–4)}
Loss	2.	Jan 1981	Chicago	Carpet (i)	(United States) Sharon Walsh	(Czechoslovakia) Martina Navrátilová (United States) Pam Shriver	3–6, 4–6
Win	5.	Mar 1981	Boston	Carpet (i)	(United States) Sharon Walsh	(United States) JoAnne Russell (Romania) Virginia Ruzici	6–7, 6–4, 6–3
Loss	3.	Mar 1981	Avon Championships	Carpet (i)	(United States) Sharon Walsh	(Czechoslovakia) Martina Navrátilová (United States) Pam Shriver	0–6, 6–7^{(6–8)}
Loss	4.	May 1981	Tokyo	Carpet (i)	(United States) Sharon Walsh	(United Kingdom) Sue Barker (United States) Ann Kiyomura	5–7, 2–6
Win	6.	Oct 1981	Brighton	Carpet (i)	(United States) Anne Smith	(Socialist Federal Republic of Yugoslavia) Mima Jaušovec (United States) Pam Shriver	6–7, 6–3, 6–4
Loss	5.	Oct 1981	Filderstadt	Carpet (i)	(United States) Anne Smith	(Socialist Federal Republic of Yugoslavia) Mima Jaušovec (Czechoslovakia) Martina Navrátilová	4–6, 1–6
Win	7.	Nov 1981	Perth	Grass	(United States) Sharon Walsh	(United States) Betsy Nagelsen (United States) Candy Reynolds	6–4, 6–2
Win	8.	Feb 1982	Kansas City	Carpet (i)	(United States) Sharon Walsh	(United States) Mary-Lou Piatek (United States) Anne Smith	4–6, 6–2, 6–2
Win	9.	Feb 1982	Oakland	Carpet (i)	(United States) Sharon Walsh	(United States) Kathy Jordan (United States) Pam Shriver	6–1, 3–6, 7–6^{(7–5)}
Loss	6.	Mar 1982	Los Angeles	Carpet (i)	(United States) Sharon Walsh	(United States) Kathy Jordan (United States) Anne Smith	3–6, 5–7
Loss	7.	Apr 1982	Amelia Island	Clay	(United States) Sharon Walsh	(United States) Leslie Allen (Socialist Federal Republic of Yugoslavia) Mima Jaušovec	1–6, 5–7
Loss	8.	Aug 1982	Montreal	Hard	(United States) Sharon Walsh	(United States) Martina Navratilova (United States) Candy Reynolds	4–6, 4–6
Win	10.	Aug 1982	Mahwah	Hard	(United States) Sharon Walsh	(United States) Rosie Casals (Australia) Wendy Turnbull	6–1, 6–4
Loss	9.	Aug 1982	US Open	Hard	(United States) Sharon Walsh	(United States) Rosie Casals (Australia) Wendy Turnbull	4–6, 4–6
Loss	10.	Sep 1982	Philadelphia	Carpet (i)	(United States) Sharon Walsh	(United States) Rosie Casals (Australia) Wendy Turnbull	6–3, 6–7^{(5–7)}, 4–6
Win	11.	Oct 1982	Deerfield Beach	Hard	(United States) Sharon Walsh	(United States) Rosie Casals (Australia) Wendy Turnbull	7–6^{(7–5)}, 7–6^{(7–3)}
Loss	11.	Oct 1982	Brighton	Carpet (i)	(United States) Sharon Walsh	(United States) Martina Navratilova (United States) Pam Shriver	6–2, 5–7, 4–6
Loss	12.	Jan 1983	Houston	Carpet (i)	(United Kingdom) Jo Durie	(United States) Martina Navratilova (United States) Pam Shriver	4–6, 3–6
Win	12.	Jan 1983	Palm Beach Garden	Clay	(United States) Sharon Walsh	(United States) Kathy Jordan (United States) Paula Smith	6–4, 4–6, 6–2
Win	13.	Jul 1983	Newport	Grass	(United States) Sharon Walsh	(United States) Barbara Jordan (Australia) Elizabeth Sayers	6–3, 6–1
Loss	13.	Sep 1983	Richmond	Carpet (i)	(United States) Kathy Jordan	(South Africa) Rosalyn Fairbank (United States) Candy Reynolds	7–6^{(7–3)}, 2–6, 1–6
Loss	14.	Sep 1983	Hartford	Carpet (i)	(United States) Kathy Jordan	(United States) Billie Jean King (United States) Sharon Walsh	6–3, 3–6, 4–6
Win	14.	Oct 1983	Detroit	Carpet (i)	(United States) Kathy Jordan	(United States) Rosie Casals (Australia) Wendy Turnbull	6–4, 6–1
Win	15.	Jan 1984	Washington	Carpet (i)	(United States) Sharon Walsh	(United States) Leslie Allen (United States) Anne White	6–1, 6–7^{(7–9)}, 6–2
Loss	15.	Jan 1984	Houston	Carpet (i)	(United States) Sharon Walsh	(Socialist Federal Republic of Yugoslavia) Mima Jaušovec (United States) Anne White	4–6, 6–3, 6–7^{(4–7)}
Loss	16.	Feb 1984	Chicago	Carpet (i)	(United States) Pam Shriver	(United States) Billie Jean King (United States) Sharon Walsh	7–5, 3–6, 3–6
Win	16.	Mar 1984	Boston	Carpet (i)	(United States) Sharon Walsh	(United States) Andrea Leand (United States) Mary-Lou Piatek	7–6^{(7–4)}, 6–0
Loss	17.	Sep 1984	Fort Lauderdale	Hard	(United States) Sharon Walsh	(United States) Martina Navratilova (Australia) Elizabeth Sayers	6–2, 2–6, 3–6
Loss	18.	Oct 1984	Brighton	Carpet (i)	(United States) Sharon Walsh	(United States) Alycia Moulton (United States) Paula Smith	7–6, 3–6, 5–7
Win	17.	Mar 1985	Dallas	Carpet (i)	(United States) Sharon Walsh	(Netherlands) Marcella Mesker (France) Pascale Paradis	5–7, 6–4, 7–6^{(7–4)}
Loss	19.	May 1985	Sydney	Carpet (i)	(United States) Sharon Walsh	(United States) Pam Shriver (United States) Elizabeth Smylie	5–7, 5–7
Loss	20.	Oct 1985	Brighton	Carpet (i)	(Czechoslovakia) Helena Suková	(United States) Lori McNeil (France) Catherine Suire	6–4, 6–7^{(3–7)}, 4–6
Loss	21.	Jan 1986	Key Biscayne	Hard	(United States) Betsy Nagelsen	(United States) Kathy Jordan (Australia) Elizabeth Smylie	6–7^{(5–7)}, 6–2, 2–6
Win	18.	Mar 1986	Nashville	Carpet (i)	(United States) Pam Shriver	(United States) Kathy Jordan (Australia) Elizabeth Smylie	6–4, 6–3
Loss	22.	Feb 1987	Wichita	Carpet (i)	(United States) Wendy White	(Soviet Union) Svetlana Parkhomenko (Soviet Union) Larisa Savchenko	2–6, 4–6
Win	19.	Jul 1988	Newport	Grass	(South Africa) Rosalyn Fairbank	(United States) Gigi Fernández (United States) Lori McNeil	6–4, 6–3

== Grand Slam performance timelines ==
Key
W	F	SF	QF	#R	RR	Q#	DNQ	A	NH

(W) winner; (F) finalist; (SF) semifinalist; (QF) quarterfinalist; (#R) rounds 4, 3, 2, 1; (RR) round-robin stage; (Q#) qualification round; (DNQ) did not qualify; (A) absent; (NH) not held; (SR) strike rate (events won / competed); (W–L) win–loss record.

=== Singles ===
Tournament	1978	1979	1980	1981	1982	1983	1984	1985	1986	1987	1988	1989	Career SR
Australian Open	A	A	A	2R	3R	3R	QF	2R	NH	A	4R	1R	0 / 7
French Open	A	A	A	A	A	A	A	1R	A	A	A	A	0 / 1
Wimbledon	2R	1R	3R	4R	QF	QF	4R	QF	A	2R	4R	A	0 / 10
U.S. Open	2R	3R	3R	SF	2R	2R	4R	2R	A	1R	4R	A	0 / 10
SR	0 / 2	0 / 2	0 / 2	0 / 3	0 / 3	0 / 3	0 / 3	0 / 4	0 / 0	0 / 2	0 / 3	0 / 1	0 / 28
Year End Ranking	62	47	25	10	8	23	12	17	26	12	10	105	

=== Doubles ===
Tournament	1978	1979	1980	1981	1982	1983	1984	1985	1986	1987	1988	1989	Career SR
Australian Open	A	A	A	QF	SF	SF	SF	SF	NH	A	SF	1R	0 / 7
French Open	A	A	A	A	A	A	A	A	A	A	A	A	0 / 0
Wimbledon	2R	2R	1R	QF	2R	SF	SF	QF	A	A	2R	2R	0 / 10
U.S. Open	A	A	A	1R	F	A	QF	QF	A	2R	1R	A	0 / 6
SR	0 / 1	0 / 1	0 / 1	0 / 3	0 / 3	0 / 2	0 / 3	0 / 3	0 / 0	0 / 1	0 / 3	0 / 2	0 / 23
Year End Ranking							3	9	25	26	51	356	
