= 1981 US Open – Women's singles qualifying =

Women's singles qualifying
- 1981 US Open

Events
Singles	men	women		boys	girls
Doubles	men	women	mixed	boys	girls
WC Singles	men	women	quad
WC Doubles	men	women	quad
Legends	men	women	mixed
← 1980 ·	US Open	· 1982 →

Players who neither had high enough rankings nor received wild cards to enter the main draw of the annual US Open Tennis Championships participated in a qualifying tournament held over several days before the event.

== Seeds ==
1. (United States) Tina Mochizuki (qualified)
2. (Australia) Linda Cassell (first round)
3. (Netherlands) Nanette Schutte (first round)
4. (United States) Marita Redondo (first round)
5. (United States) Lucy Gordon (qualifying competition, Lucky loser)
6. (Brazil) Cláudia Monteiro (first round)
7. (Netherlands) Mariëtte Pakker (first round)
8. (United States) Shelley Solomon (first round)
9. (France) Marie-Christine Calleja (qualified)
10. (United States) Jill Davis (qualifying competition, Lucky loser)
11. (Sweden) Catrin Jexell (first round)
12. (United States) Joni Urban (second round)
13. (Australia) Pam Whytcross (first round)
14. (United Kingdom) Kate Brasher (qualified)
15. (United States) Felicia Hutnick (qualified)
16. (United States) Heather Ludloff (second round)

== Qualifiers ==
1. (United States) Tina Mochizuki
2. (United States) Leigh-Anne Thompson
3. (United Kingdom) Kate Brasher
4. (United States) Felicia Hutnick
5. (France) Marie-Christine Calleja
6. (United States) Barbara Gerken
7. (United States) Jean Hepner
8. (United States) Kate Gompert

== Lucky losers ==
1. (United States) Jill Davis
2. (United States) Lucy Gordon
3. (United States) Jodi Appelbaum-Steinbauer
4. (Hungary) Beatrix Klein

== Qualifying draw ==
=== Key ===
- Q = Qualifier
- WC = Wild card
- LL = Lucky loser
- Alt = Alternate
- ITF = ITF entry
- PR = Protected ranking
- SR = Special ranking
- SE = Special exempt
- JE = Junior exempt
- JR = Junior Accelerator Programme entrant
- CO = College Accelerator Programme entrant
- NG = Next Gen Accelerator Program entrant
- w/o = Walkover
- r = Retired
- d = Defaulted

=== First qualifier ===
First round
1	(United States) Tina Mochizuki	3	6	6
(United States) Shelby Torrance	6	4	1
(United States) Connie Yowell	6	6
(United States) Lori Miller	1	2
(United States) Gina Genovese	2	3
(United States) Lori McNeil	6	6
(Japan) Sonoe Yonezawa	6^{2}	1
10	(United States) Jill Davis	7^{7}	6

Second round
1	(United States) Tina Mochizuki	6	6
(United States) Connie Yowell	1	4
(United States) Lori McNeil	3	0
10	(United States) Jill Davis	6	6

Qualifying competition
1	(United States) Tina Mochizuki	6	2	6
10	(United States) Jill Davis	2	6	4

=== Second qualifier ===
First round
12	(United States) Joni Urban	2	7^{7}	7^{7}
(United States) Jean Nachand	6	6^{2}	6^{3}
(United States) Aleida Spex	7	6
(Czechoslovakia) Helena Suková	5	4
(United States) Kay McDaniel	4	3
(United States) Penny Barg	6	6
(United States) Leigh-Anne Thompson	6	6
8	(United States) Shelley Solomon	3	1

Second round
12	(United States) Joni Urban	2	6	2
(United States) Aleida Spex	6	2	6
(United States) Penny Barg	4	2
(United States) Leigh-Anne Thompson	6	6

Qualifying competition
(United States) Aleida Spex	0^{r}
(United States) Leigh-Anne Thompson	6

=== Third qualifier ===
First round
4	(United States) Marita Redondo	3	2
(United States) Kyle Copeland	6	6
(Hungary) Beatrix Klein	6	7^{7}
(United Kingdom) Clare Harrison	0	6^{2}
(Canada) Hélène Pelletier	0	1
(United States) Michaela Washington	6	6
(New Zealand) Chris Newton	3	6	1
14	(United Kingdom) Kate Brasher	6	1	6

Second round
(United States) Kyle Copeland	6^{5}	7	1
(Hungary) Beatrix Klein	7^{7}	5	6
(United States) Michaela Washington	7^{7}	1	4
14	(United Kingdom) Kate Brasher	6^{4}	6	6

Qualifying competition
(Hungary) Beatrix Klein	4	3
14	(United Kingdom) Kate Brasher	6	6

=== Fourth qualifier ===
First round
15	(United States) Felicia Hutnick	7	6
(United States) Lisa Bublitz	5	4
(Chile) Silvana Urroz	6	6
(United States) Shannon Gordon	3	3
(Netherlands) Karin Moos	2	6	1
(United States) Phyllis Blackwell	6	2	6
(South Africa) Ilana Kloss	6	2	6
6	(Brazil) Cláudia Monteiro	3	6	4

Second round
15	(United States) Felicia Hutnick	6	7^{7}
(Chile) Silvana Urroz	3	6^{5}
(United States) Phyllis Blackwell	2	6	3
(South Africa) Ilana Kloss	6	2	6

Qualifying competition
15	(United States) Felicia Hutnick	0	7	6
(South Africa) Ilana Kloss	6	5	1

=== Fifth qualifier ===
First round
5	(United States) Lucy Gordon	1	6	6
(United States) Vicki Beggs	6	3	1
(United States) Betsy Blaney	7^{7}	6
(United States) Julie Filkoff	6^{1}	3
(United States) Jenni Goodling	2	4
(United States) Cheryl Jones	6	6
(United States) Suzanne Jarell	2	1
9	(France) Marie-Christine Calleja	6	6

Second round
5	(United States) Lucy Gordon	6	6
(United States) Betsy Blaney	2	3
(United States) Cheryl Jones	6^{4}	3
9	(France) Marie-Christine Calleja	7^{7}	6

Qualifying competition
5	(United States) Lucy Gordon	6	1	3
9	(France) Marie-Christine Calleja	4	6	6

=== Sixth qualifier ===
First round
16	(United States) Heather Ludloff	6	6
(United States) Donna Rubin	4	2
(United States) Barbara Gerken	6	6
(United States) Cathy Farrell	1	1
(United States) Nancy Ornstein	6	3	2
(United States) Carol Watson	2	6	6
(United States) Louise Allen	3	6	6
3	(Netherlands) Nanette Schutte	6	1	2

Second round
16	(United States) Heather Ludloff	2	2
(United States) Barbara Gerken	6	6
(United States) Carol Watson	3	1
(United States) Louise Allen	6	6

Qualifying competition
(United States) Barbara Gerken	6	6
(United States) Louise Allen	4	3

=== Seventh qualifier ===
First round
7	(Netherlands) Mariëtte Pakker	6^{5}	0
(United States) Cissie Donigan	7^{7}	6
(United States) Jean Hepner	6	0	6
(United States) Caryn Copeland	2	6	1
(United States) Stephanie Hales	1	0
(United States) Jodi Appelbaum-Steinbauer	6	6
(United States) Genevieve Greiwe	7	6
11	(Sweden) Catrin Jexell	5	3

Second round
(United States) Cissie Donigan	3	7	1
(United States) Jean Hepner	6	5	6
(United States) Jodi Appelbaum-Steinbauer	6	6
(United States) Genevieve Greiwe	2	2

Qualifying competition
(United States) Jean Hepner	2	6	6
(United States) Jodi Appelbaum-Steinbauer	6	3	4

=== Eighth qualifier ===
First round
13	(Australia) Pam Whytcross	0	1
(United States) Kate Gompert	6	6
(United States) Camille Benjamin	6	6
(New Zealand) Brenda Perry	2	2
(Canada) Angela Walker	4	4
(United States) Kathy O'Brien	6	6
(United States) Gretchen Rush	6	6
2	(Australia) Linda Cassell	2	1

Second round
(United States) Kate Gompert	6	3	6
(United States) Camille Benjamin	4	6	2
(United States) Kathy O'Brien	3	2
(United States) Gretchen Rush	6	6

Qualifying competition
(United States) Kate Gompert	6	6
(United States) Gretchen Rush	4	2
