= 1981 in tennis =

This page covers all the important events in the sport of tennis in 1981. It provides the results of notable tournaments throughout the year on both the ATP and WTA Tours, the Davis Cup, and the Fed Cup.

== Australian Open ==
Category	Champion(s)	Finalist(s)	Score
Men's singles	(South Africa) Johan Kriek	(United States) Steve Denton	6–2, 7–6^{(7–1)}, 6–7^{(1–7)}, 6–4 (Note: It was Kriek's 1st career Grand Slam singles title.)
Women's singles	(United States) Martina Navratilova	(United States) Chris Evert	6–7^{(4–7)}, 6–4, 7–5 (Note: It was Navratilova's 3rd career Grand Slam singles title and her 1st title at the Australian Open.)
Men's doubles	(Australia) Mark Edmondson (Australia) Kim Warwick	(United States) Hank Pfister (United States) John Sadri	6–3, 6–7, 6–3 (Note: It was Edmondson's 2nd career Grand Slam doubles title and his 2nd title at the Australian Open.) (Note: It was Warwick's 3rd career Grand Slam doubles title and his 3rd and last title at the Australian Open.)
Women's doubles	(United States) Kathy Jordan (United States) Anne Smith	(United States) Martina Navratilova (United States) Pam Shriver	6–2, 7–5 (Note: It was Jordan's 4th career Grand Slam doubles title and her 1st and only title at the Australian Open.) (Note: It was Smith's 4th career Grand Slam doubles title and her 1st and only title at the Australian Open.)
Mixed doubles	The competition was not held between 1970 and 1986.		

== French Open ==
Category	Champion(s)	Finalist(s)	Score
Men's singles	(Sweden) Björn Borg	(Czechoslovakia) Ivan Lendl	6–1, 4–6, 6–2, 3–6, 6–1 (Note: It was Borg's 1st title of the year, and his 61st overall. It was his 11th (and last) career Grand Slam title, and his 6th French Open title (at that time, an Open Era record).)
Women's singles	(Czechoslovakia) Hana Mandlíková	(West Germany) Sylvia Hanika	6–2, 6–4 (Note: It was Mandlíková's 2nd title of the year, and her 13th overall. It was her 2nd career Grand Slam title, and her 1st French Open title.)
Men's doubles	(Switzerland) Heinz Günthardt (Hungary) Balázs Taróczy	(United States) Terry Moor (United States) Eliot Teltscher	6–2, 7–6, 6–3
Women's doubles	(South Africa) Rosalyn Fairbank (South Africa) Tanya Harford	(United States) Candy Reynolds (United States) Paula Smith	6–1, 6–3
Mixed doubles	(United States) Andrea Jaeger (United States) James Arias	(Netherlands) Betty Stöve (United States) Frederick McNair	7–6, 6–4

== Wimbledon ==
Category	Champion(s)	Finalist(s)	Score
Men's singles	(United States) John McEnroe	(Sweden) Björn Borg	4–6, 7–6^{(7–1)}, 7–6^{(7–4)}, 6–4 (Note: It was McEnroe's 3rd career Grand Slam title and his 1st Wimbledon title.)
Women's singles	(United States) Chris Evert Lloyd	(Czechoslovakia) Hana Mandlíková	6–2, 6–2 (Note: It was Evert-Lloyd's 12th career Grand Slam title and her third and last Wimbledon title.)
Men's doubles	(United States) Peter Fleming (United States) John McEnroe	(United States) Bob Lutz (United States) Stan Smith	6–4, 6–4, 6–4 (Note: It was Fleming's 3rd career Grand Slam title and his 2nd Wimbledon title. It was McEnroe's 7th career Grand Slam title and his 3rd Wimbledon title.)
Women's doubles	(United States) Martina Navratilova (United States) Pam Shriver	(United States) Kathy Jordan (United States) Anne Smith	6–3, 7–6^{(8–6)} (Note: It was Navratilova's 11th career Grand Slam title and her 5th Wimbledon title. It was Shriver's 1st career Grand Slam title and her 1st Wimbledon title.)
Mixed doubles	(South Africa) Frew McMillan (Netherlands) Betty Stöve	(United States) John Austin (United States) Tracy Austin	4–6, 7–6^{(7–2)}, 6–3 (Note: It was McMillan's 10th and last career Grand Slam title and his 5th Wimbledon title. It was Stöve's 10th and last career Grand Slam title and her 3rd Wimbledon title.)

== US Open ==
Category	Champion(s)	Finalist(s)	Score
Men's singles	(United States) John McEnroe	(Sweden) Björn Borg	4–6, 6–2, 6–4, 6–3 (Note: It was McEnroe's 4th career Grand Slam title and his 3rd US Open title.)
Women's singles	(United States) Tracy Austin	(United States) Martina Navratilova	1–6, 7–6^{(7–4)}, 7–6^{(7–1)} (Note: It was Austin's 2nd and last career Grand Slam title and her 2nd US Open title.)
Men's doubles	(United States) Peter Fleming (United States) John McEnroe	(Switzerland) Heinz Günthardt (Australia) Peter McNamara	by walkover (Note: It was Fleming's 4th career Grand Slam title and his 2nd US Open title. It was McEnroe's 9th career Grand Slam title and his 4th US Open title.)
Women's doubles	(United States) Kathy Jordan (United States) Anne Smith	(United States) Rosemary Casals (Australia) Wendy Turnbull	6–3, 6–3 (Note: It was Jordan's 3rd career Grand Slam title and her only US Open title. It was Smith's 4th career Grand Slam title and her 1st US Open title.)
Mixed doubles	(United States) Anne Smith (South Africa) Kevin Curren	(United States) JoAnne Russell (United States) Steve Denton	6–4, 7–6^{(7–4)} (Note: It was Smith's 5th career Grand Slam title and her 2nd US Open title. It was Curren's 1st career Grand Slam title and his 1st US Open title.)

== Davis Cup ==
First round 6–8 March
Munich, West Germany (indoor carpet)
West Germany	2
Argentina	3
Timișoara, Romania (indoor hard)
Romania	3
Brazil	2
Brighton, United Kingdom (indoor carpet)
Great Britain	3
Italy	2
Seoul, South Korea (clay)
South Korea	0
New Zealand	5
Yokohama, Japan (indoor carpet)
Japan	0
Sweden	5
Lyon, France (indoor carpet)
France	2
Australia	3
Zürich, Switzerland (indoor hard)
Switzerland	2
Czechoslovakia	3
Carlsbad, CA, United States (hard)
United States	3
Mexico	2

Quarterfinals; 9–12 July
Timișoara, Romania (hard)
Argentina	3
Romania	2
Christchurch, New Zealand (carpet)
Great Britain	4
New Zealand	1
Båstad, Sweden (clay)
Sweden	1
Australia	3
New York, NY, United States (hard)
Czechoslovakia	1
United States	4

Semifinals; 2–4 October
Buenos Aires, Argentina (clay)
Argentina	5
Great Britain	0
Portland, OR, United States (indoor carpet)
Australia	0
United States	5

Final; 11–13 December
Cincinnati, OH, United States (indoor carpet)
Argentina	1
United States	3

== Federation Cup ==
First Round
United States	3
South Korea	0
Spain	2
Mexico	1
Indonesia	0
Israel	3
Hungary	0
Romania	3
Switzerland	3
Greece	0
New Zealand	1
Chinese Taipei	2
Brazil	3
Ireland	0
Japan	0
West Germany	3
Czechoslovakia	3
Sweden	0
Denmark	0
Soviet Union	3
France	3
Canada	0
Belgium	0
Great Britain	3
Netherlands	2
Hong Kong	1
Italy	2
Yugoslavia	1
Thailand	0
China	3
Philippines	0
Australia	3

Second Round
United States	3
Spain	0
Israel	0
Romania	3
Switzerland	3
Chinese Taipei	0
Brazil	0
West Germany	2
Czechoslovakia	1
Soviet Union	2
France	0
Great Britain	3
Netherlands	2
Italy	1
China	0
Australia	3

Quarterfinals
United States	3
Romania	0
Switzerland	2
West Germany	1
Soviet Union	1
Great Britain	2
Netherlands	0
Australia	3

Semifinals
United States	3
Switzerland	0
Great Britain	2
Australia	1

Final
United States	3
Great Britain	0
