= 1981 Avon Championships of Detroit – Singles =

Singles
- 1981 Avon Championships of Detroit

Final
- Champion: (United States) Leslie Allen
- Runner-up: (Czechoslovakia) Hana Mandlíková
- Score: 6–4, 6–4

Details
- Draw: 32
- Seeds: 8

Events
Singles	Doubles
← 1980 ·	Virginia Slims of Detroit	· 1982 →

Billie Jean King was the defending champion.

Unseeded Leslie Allen won the title, defeating top-seeded Hana Mandlíková in the final 6–4, 6–4.

== Seeds ==
A champion seed is indicated in bold text while text in italics indicates the round in which that seed was eliminated.

1. (Czechoslovakia) Hana Mandlíková (final)
2. (Australia) Wendy Turnbull (quarterfinals)
3. (United States) Pam Shriver (semifinals)
4. (Romania) Virginia Ruzici (quarterfinals)
5. (Czechoslovakia) Regina Maršíková (first round)
6. (Socialist Federal Republic of Yugoslavia) Mima Jaušovec (quarterfinals)
7. (United Kingdom) Sue Barker (second round)
8. (United States) JoAnne Russell (first round)

== Draw ==
=== Key ===
- Q = Qualifier
- WC = Wild card
- LL = Lucky loser
- Alt = Alternate
- SE = Special exempt
- PR = Protected ranking
- ITF = ITF entry
- JE = Junior exempt
- w/o = Walkover
- r = Retired
- d = Defaulted
- SR = Special ranking

=== Final ===
Semifinals
1	(Czechoslovakia) **Hana Mandlíková**	**6**	**6**
3	(United States) Pam Shriver	0	2
(United States) **Leslie Allen**	2	**7**	**6**
(United States) Barbara Potter	**6**	6	4

Final
1	(Czechoslovakia) Hana Mandlíková	4	4
(United States) **Leslie Allen**	**6**	**6**

=== Top half ===
First round
1	(Czechoslovakia) **Hana Mandlíková**	**6**	**6**
(Czechoslovakia) Iva Budařová	1	1
(Sweden) Nina Bohm	6	4
(United States) **Lisa Bonder**	**7**	**6**
(United States) **Julie Harrington**	**6**	1	**6**
(United States) Caroline Stoll	2	**6**	3
(West Germany) **Claudia Kohde**	**6**	**6**
5	(Czechoslovakia) Regina Maršíková	1	3
3	(United States) **Pam Shriver**	**6**	**6**
(United States) Sherry Acker	1	3
(United States) **Anne Smith**	**6**	**6**
(South Africa) Yvonne Vermaak	4	3
(West Germany) **Bettina Bunge**	**6**	**6**
(United States) Betsy Nagelsen	0	2
7	(United States) Lea Antonoplis	2	**6**	4
(United Kingdom) **Sue Barker**	**6**	3	**6**

Second round
1	(Czechoslovakia) **Hana Mandlíková**	**6**	**6**
(United States) Lisa Bonder	1	1
(United States) Julie Harrington	3	6
(West Germany) **Claudia Kohde**	**6**	**7**
3	**(United States) Pam Shriver**	1	**6**	**7**
(United States) Anne Smith	**6**	1	6
**(West Germany) Bettina Bunge**	**6**	**6**
7	(United Kingdom) Sue Barker	4	2

Quarterfinals
1	**(Czechoslovakia) Hana Mandlíková**	**6**	3	**6**
(West Germany) C Kohde	3	**6**	2
3	**(United States) Pam Shriver**	**6**	**6**
(West Germany) Bettina Bunge	4	2

Semifinals
1	**(Czechoslovakia) Hana Mandlíková**	**6**	**6**
3	(United States) Pam Shriver	0	2

=== Bottom half ===
First round
6	(Socialist Federal Republic of Yugoslavia) **Mima Jaušovec**	**6**	**6**
(Switzerland) Isabelle Villiger	1	1
(United States) Marita Redondo	6	1
(United States) **Paula Smith**	**7**	**6**
(South Africa) Rosalyn Fairbank	6	**6**	2
(United States) **Leslie Allen**	**7**	3	**6**
(United States) Beth Norton	4	6
4	(Romania) **Virginia Ruzici**	**6**	**7**
8	(United States) JoAnne Russell	1	3
(United States) **Susan Mascarin**	**6**	**6**
(United States) **Barbara Potter**	**6**	**6**
(United States) Kathy Horvath	1	4
(Romania) Lucia Romanov	1	0
(United States) **Mary-Lou Piatek**	**6**	**6**
(Netherlands) Betty Stöve	2	3
2	(Australia) **Wendy Turnbull**	**6**	**6**

Second round
6	(Socialist Federal Republic of Yugoslavia) **Mima Jaušovec**	**6**	**6**
(United States) Paula Smith	1	1
(United States) **Leslie Allen**	**6**	**6**
4	(Romania) Virginia Ruzici	1	4
(United States) Susan Mascarin	3	3
(United States) **Barbara Potter**	**6**	**6**
(United States) Mary-Lou Piatek	3	3
2	(Australia) **Wendy Turnbull**	**6**	**6**

Quarterfinals
6	(Socialist Federal Republic of Yugoslavia) Mima Jaušovec	3	2
(United States) **Leslie Allen**	**6**	**6**
(United States) **Barbara Potter**	**6**	6	**6**
2	(Australia) Wendy Turnbull	3	**7**	3

Semifinals
(United States) **Leslie Allen**	2	**7**	**6**
(United States) Barbara Potter	**6**	6	4
