= Hana Mandlíková career statistics =

This is a list of the main career statistics of former professional tennis player Hana Mandlíková.

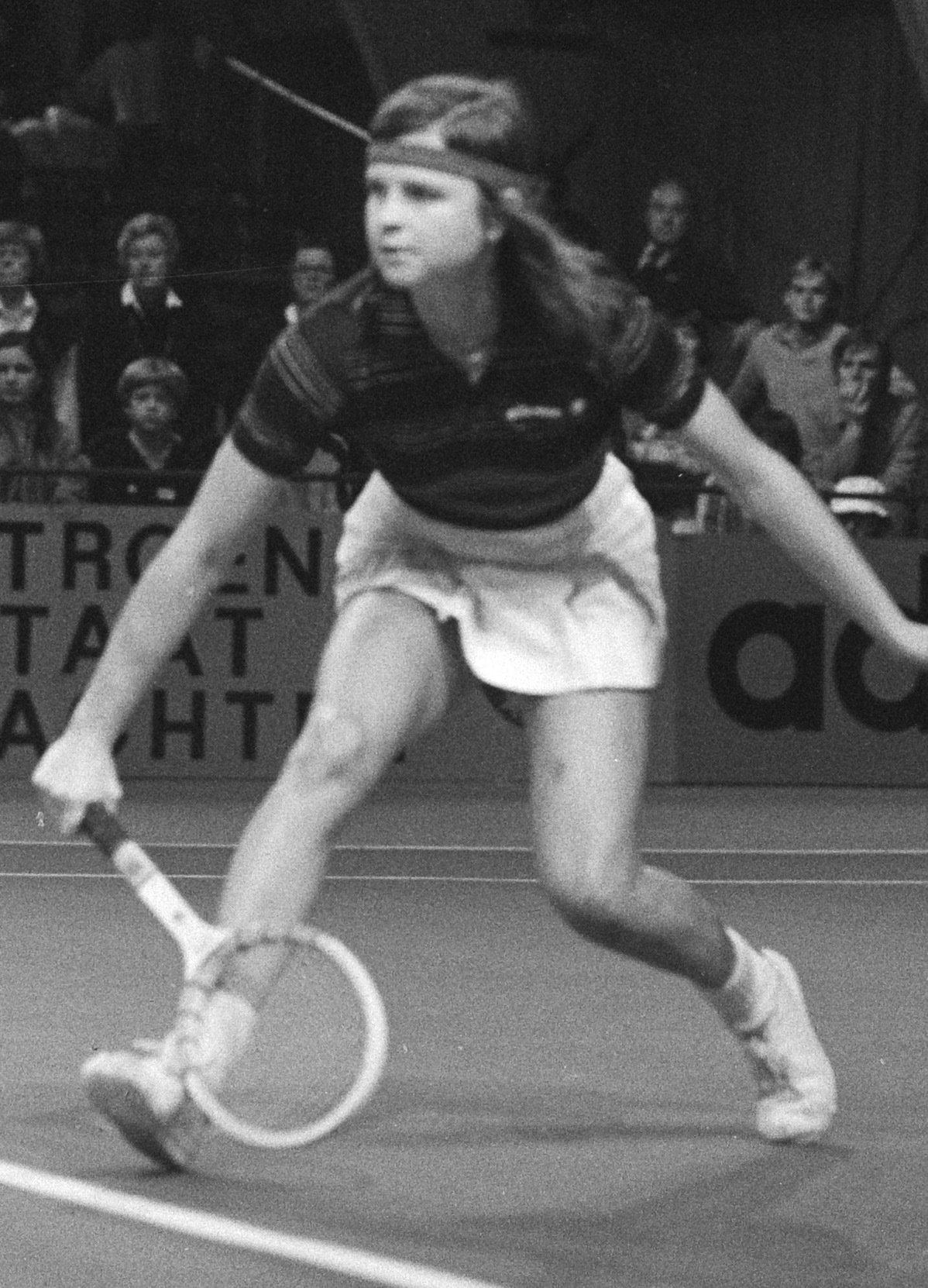
Mandlíková in 1980

== Major finals ==
=== Grand Slam finals ===
==== Singles: 8 (4 titles, 4 runners-up) ====
Result	Year	Championship	Surface	Opponent	Score
Loss	1980	US Open	Hard	(United States) Chris Evert	7–5, 1–6, 1–6
Win	1980	Australian Open	Grass	(Australia) Wendy Turnbull	6–0, 7–5
Win	1981	French Open	Clay	(West Germany) Sylvia Hanika	6–2, 6–4
Loss	1981	Wimbledon	Grass	(United States) Chris Evert	2–6, 2–6
Loss	1982	US Open	Hard	(United States) Chris Evert	3–6, 1–6
Win	1985	US Open	Hard	(United States) Martina Navratilova	7–6^{(7–3)}, 1–6, 7–6^{(7–2)}
Loss	1986	Wimbledon	Grass	(United States) Martina Navratilova	6–7^{(1–7)}, 3–6
Win	1987	Australian Open	Grass	(United States) Martina Navratilova	7–5, 7–6^{(7–1)}

==== Doubles: 4 (1 title, 3 runners-up) ====
Result	Year	Championship	Surface	Partner	Opponents	Score
Loss	1984	French Open	Clay	(West Germany) Claudia Kohde-Kilsch	(United States) Martina Navratilova (United States) Pam Shriver	6–4, 2–6, 2–6
Loss	1986	Wimbledon	Grass	(Australia) Wendy Turnbull	(United States) Martina Navratilova (United States) Pam Shriver	1–6, 3–6
Loss	1986	US Open	Hard	(Australia) Wendy Turnbull	(United States) Martina Navratilova (United States) Pam Shriver	4–6, 6–3, 3–6
Win	1989	US Open	Hard	(United States) Martina Navratilova	(United States) Mary Joe Fernández (United States) Pam Shriver	7–5, 4–6, 6–4

=== Year-End Championships finals ===
==== Singles: 1 (1 runner–up) ====
Result	Year	Location	Surface	Opponent	Score
Loss	1986 (Mar.)	New York City	Carpet (I)	(United States) Martina Navratilova	2–6, 0–6, 6–3, 1–6

==== Doubles: 1 (1 title) ====
Result	Year	Location	Surface	Partner	Opponents	Score
Win	1986 (Mar.)	New York City	Carpet (I)	(Australia) Wendy Turnbull	(West Germany) Claudia Kohde-Kilsch (Czechoslovakia) Helena Suková	6–4, 6–7^{(4–7)}, 6–3

== WTA career finals ==
=== Singles: 52 (27–25) ===
Winner — Legend Grand Slam tournaments (4–4) WTA Tour Championships (0–1) Virginia Slims, Avon, other (23–20)	Titles by surface Hard (3–5) Grass (7–4) Clay (4–7) Carpet (13–9)

Result	No.	Date	Tournament	Surface	Opponent	Score
Win	1.	2 October 1978	Madrid	Clay	(Italy) Sabina Simmonds	6–2, 6–2
Win	2.	9 October 1978	Barcelona	Clay	(Italy) Sabina Simmonds	6–1, 5–7, 6–3
Win	3.	5 February 1979	Montreal	Carpet (i)	(United States) Leslie Allen	7–6, 6–2
Win	4.	18 July 1979	Kitzbühel	Clay	(West Germany) Sylvia Hanika	2–6, 7–5, 6–3
Win	5.	26 November 1979	Melbourne	Grass	(Australia) Wendy Turnbull	6–3, 6–2
Win	6.	10 December 1979	Adelaide	Grass	(Romania) Virginia Ruzici	7–5, 2–2 ret.
Win	7.	17 December 1979	Sydney	Grass	(West Germany) Bettina Bunge	6–3, 3–6, 6–3
Loss	1.	15 April 1980	Amelia Island	Clay	(Czechoslovakia) Martina Navratilova	7–5, 3–6, 2–6
Loss	2.	21 July 1980	Kitzbühel	Clay	(Romania) Virginia Ruzici	6–3, 1–6 ret.
Win	8.	18 August 1980	Mahwah	Hard	(United States) Andrea Jaeger	6–7^{(0–7)}, 6–2, 6–2
Loss	3.	26 August 1980	US Open	Hard	(United States) Chris Evert-Lloyd	7–5, 1–6, 1–6
Loss	4.	15 September 1980	Las Vegas	Hard (i)	(United States) Andrea Jaeger	5–7, 6–4, 3–6
Win	9.	22 September 1980	Atlanta	Carpet (i)	(Australia) Wendy Turnbull	6–3, 7–5
Win	10.	27 October 1980	Stockholm	Carpet (i)	(West Germany) Bettina Bunge	6–2, 6–2
Win	11.	10 November 1980	Amsterdam	Carpet (i)	(Romania) Virginia Ruzici	5–7, 6–2, 7–5
Win	12.	24 November 1980	Australian Open	Grass	(Australia) Wendy Turnbull	6–0, 7–5
Win	13.	8 December 1980	Adelaide	Grass	(United Kingdom) Sue Barker	6–2, 6–4
Loss	5.	26 January 1981	Chicago	Carpet (i)	(Czechoslovakia) Martina Navratilova	4–6, 2–6
Loss	6.	2 February 1981	Detroit	Carpet (i)	(United States) Leslie Allen	4–6, 4–6
Win	14.	16 February 1981	Houston	Carpet (i)	(West Germany) Bettina Bunge	6–4, 6–4
Loss	7.	4 April 1981	Carlsbad	Hard	(United States) Chris Evert-Lloyd	4–6, 3–6
Win	15.	25 May 1981	French Open	Clay	(West Germany) Sylvia Hanika	6–2, 6–4
Loss	8.	22 June 1981	Wimbledon	Grass	(United States) Chris Evert-Lloyd	2–6, 2–6
Loss	9.	20 July 1981	Monte Carlo	Clay	(West Germany) Sylvia Hanika	6–2, 3–6, 6–5 ab.
Win	16.	24 August 1981	Mahwah	Hard	(United States) Pam Casale	6–2, 6–2
Loss	10.	3 May 1982	Perugia	Clay	(United States) Chris Evert-Lloyd	0–6, 2–6
Loss	11.	14 June 1982	Eastbourne	Grass	(United States) Martina Navratilova	4–6, 3–6
Loss	12.	31 August 1982	US Open	Hard	(United States) Chris Evert-Lloyd	3–6, 1–6
Loss	13.	22 January 1983	Marco Island	Clay	(United States) Andrea Jaeger	1–6, 3–6
Loss	14.	22 August 1983	Mahwah	Hard	(United Kingdom) Jo Durie	6–2, 5–7, 4–6
Win	17.	2 January 1984	Washington	Carpet (i)	(United States) Zina Garrison	6–1, 6–1
Win	18.	9 January 1984	Oakland	Carpet (i)	(United States) Martina Navratilova	7–6^{(8–6)}, 3–6, 6–4
Win	19.	30 January 1984	Houston	Carpet (i)	(Bulgaria) Manuela Maleeva	6–4, 6–2
Win	20.	19 March 1984	Dallas	Carpet (i)	(United States) Kathy Jordan	7–6^{(7–3)}, 3–6, 6–1
Win	21.	26 March 1984	Boston	Carpet (i)	(Czechoslovakia) Helena Suková	7–5, 6–0
Loss	15.	12 November 1984	Tokyo	Carpet (i)	(Bulgaria) Manuela Maleeva	1–6, 6–1, 4–6
Win	22.	18 February 1985	Oakland	Carpet (i)	(United States) Chris Evert-Lloyd	6–2, 6–4
Win	23.	4 March 1985	Princeton	Carpet (i)	(Sweden) Catarina Lindqvist	6–3, 7–5
Loss	16.	1 April 1985	Palm Beach Gardens	Clay	(United States) Chris Evert-Lloyd	3–6, 3–6
Win	24.	27 August 1985	US Open	Hard	(United States) Martina Navratilova	7–6^{(7–3)}, 1–6, 7–6^{(7–2)}
Loss	17.	28 October 1985	Zürich	Carpet (i)	(United States) Zina Garrison	1–6, 3–6
Loss	18.	18 November 1985	Sydney	Grass	(United States) Martina Navratilova	6–3, 1–6, 2–6
Loss	19.	17 March 1986	Virginia Slims Championships	Carpet (i)	(United States) Martina Navratilova	2–6, 0–6, 6–3, 1–6
Loss	20.	23 June 1986	Wimbledon	Grass	(United States) Martina Navratilova	6–7^{(1–7)}, 3–6
Loss	21.	13 October 1986	Filderstadt	Carpet (i)	(United States) Martina Navratilova	2–6, 3–6
Loss	22.	3 November 1986	Worcester	Carpet (i)	(United States) Martina Navratilova	2–6, 2–6
Loss	23.	10 November 1986	Chicago	Carpet (i)	(United States) Martina Navratilova	5–7, 5–7
Win	25.	29 December 1986	Brisbane	Grass	(United States) Pam Shriver	6–2, 2–6, 6–4
Win	26.	12 January 1987	Australian Open	Grass	(United States) Martina Navratilova	7–5, 7–6^{(7–1)}
Win	27.	23 March 1987	Washington	Carpet (i)	(United States) Barbara Potter	6–4, 6–2
Loss	24.	13 April 1987	Amelia Island	Clay	(West Germany) Steffi Graf	3–6, 4–6
Loss	25.	25 October 1987	Zürich	Carpet (i)	(West Germany) Steffi Graf	2–6, 2–6

=== Doubles: 38 (19–19) ===
Winner — Legend Grand Slam tournaments (1–3) WTA Tour Championships (1–0) Tier I (0–1) Tier II (1–0) Tier III (1–2) Tier IV (0–1) Tier V (0–0) Virginia Slims, Avon, other (15–12)	Titles by surface Hard (1–5) Grass (3–2) Clay (6–5) Carpet (9–7)

Result	No.	Date	Tournament	Surface	Partner	Opponents	Score
Win	1.	10 December 1979	Adelaide	Grass	(Romania) Virginia Ruzici	(United Kingdom) Sue Barker (United States) Pam Shriver	2–6, 6–4, 6–4
Win	2.	5 May 1980	Perugia	Clay	(Czechoslovakia) Renáta Tomanová	(Argentina) Ivanna Madruga (Argentina) Adriana Villagrán	6–4, 6–4
Loss	1.	21 July 1980	Kitzbühel	Clay	(Czechoslovakia) Renáta Tomanová	(West Germany) Claudia Kohde-Kilsch (West Germany) Eva Pfaff	w/o
Loss	2.	27 October 1980	Stockholm	Carpet (i)	(Netherlands) Betty Stöve	(Socialist Federal Republic of Yugoslavia) Mima Jaušovec (Romania) Virginia Ruzici	2–6, 1–6
Win	3.	3 November 1980	Filderstadt	Carpet (i)	(Netherlands) Betty Stöve	(United States) Kathy Jordan (United States) Anne Smith	6–4, 7–5
Win	4.	10 November 1980	Amsterdam	Carpet (i)	(Netherlands) Betty Stöve	(Socialist Federal Republic of Yugoslavia) Mima Jaušovec (United States) JoAnne Russell	7–6, 7–6
Loss	3.	2 February 1981	Detroit	Carpet (i)	(Netherlands) Betty Stöve	(United States) Rosie Casals (Australia) Wendy Turnbull	4–6, 2–6
Loss	4.	11 April 1983	Amelia Island	Clay	(Romania) Virginia Ruzici	(South Africa) Rosalyn Fairbank (United States) Candy Reynolds	4–6, 2–6
Loss	5.	21 November 1983	Sydney	Grass	(Czechoslovakia) Helena Suková	(United Kingdom) Anne Hobbs (Australia) Wendy Turnbull	4–6, 3–6
Win	5.	23 January 1984	Marco Island	Clay	(Czechoslovakia) Helena Suková	(United Kingdom) Anne Hobbs (United States) Andrea Jaeger	3–6, 6–2, 6–2
Win	6.	9 April 1984	Hilton Head Island	Clay	(West Germany) Claudia Kohde-Kilsch	(United Kingdom) Anne Hobbs (United States) Sharon Walsh	7–5, 6–2
Win	7.	23 April 1984	Orlando	Clay	(West Germany) Claudia Kohde-Kilsch	(United Kingdom) Anne Hobbs (Australia) Wendy Turnbull	6–0, 1–6, 6–3
Loss	6.	28 May 1984	French Open	Clay	(West Germany) Claudia Kohde-Kilsch	(United States) Martina Navratilova (United States) Pam Shriver	6–3, 2–6, 2–6
Loss	7.	20 August 1984	Montreal	Hard	(West Germany) Claudia Kohde-Kilsch	(United States) Kathy Jordan (Australia) Elizabeth Sayers	1–6, 2–6
Loss	8.	29 October 1984	Zürich	Carpet (i)	(West Germany) Claudia Kohde-Kilsch	(United States) Andrea Leand (Hungary) Andrea Temesvári	1–6, 3–6
Loss	9.	5 February 1985	Delray Beach	Hard	(United States) Kathy Jordan	(United States) Gigi Fernández (United States) Martina Navratilova	6–7^{(4–7)}, 2–6
Win	8.	18 February 1985	Oakland	Carpet (i)	(Australia) Wendy Turnbull	(South Africa) Rosalyn Fairbank (United States) Candy Reynolds	4–6, 7–5, 6–1
Win	9.	15 April 1985	Amelia Island	Clay	(South Africa) Rosalyn Fairbank	(Canada) Carling Bassett (United States) Chris Evert-Lloyd	6–1, 2–6, 6–2
Loss	10.	29 July 1985	Manhattan Beach	Hard	(Australia) Wendy Turnbull	(West Germany) Claudia Kohde-Kilsh (Czechoslovakia) Helena Suková	4–6, 2–6
Win	10.	14 October 1985	Filderstadt	Carpet (i)	(United States) Pam Shriver	(Sweden) Carina Karlsson (Denmark) Tine Scheuer-Larsen	6–2, 6–1
Win	11.	28 October 1985	Zürich	Carpet (i)	(Hungary) Andrea Temesvári	(West Germany) Claudia Kohde-Kilsch (Czechoslovakia) Helena Suková	6–4, 3–6, 7–5
Win	12.	18 November 1985	Sydney	Grass	(Australia) Wendy Turnbull	(South Africa) Rosalyn Fairbank (United States) Candy Reynolds	3–6, 7–6^{(7–5)}, 6–4
Win	13.	24 February 1986	Oakland	Carpet (i)	(Australia) Wendy Turnbull	(United States) Bonnie Gadusek (Czechoslovakia) Helena Suková	7–6^{(7–5)}, 6–1
Loss	11.	3 March 1986	Princeton	Carpet (i)	(Czechoslovakia) Helena Suková	(United States) Kathy Jordan (Australia) Elizabeth Sayers	3–6, 5–7
Loss	12.	10 March 1986	Dallas	Carpet (i)	(Australia) Wendy Turnbull	(West Germany) Claudia Kohde-Kilsch (Czechoslovakia) Helena Suková	6–4, 5–7, 4–6
Win	14.	17 March 1986	Virginia Slims Championships	Carpet (i)	(Australia) Wendy Turnbull	(West Germany) Claudia Kohde-Kilsch (Czechoslovakia) Helena Suková	6–4, 6–7^{(4–7)}, 6–3
Loss	13.	23 June 1986	Wimbledon	Grass	(Australia) Wendy Turnbull	(United States) Martina Navratilova (United States) Pam Shriver	1–6, 3–6
Loss	14.	26 August 1986	US Open	Hard	(Australia) Wendy Turnbull	(United States) Martina Navratilova (United States) Pam Shriver	4–6, 6–3, 3–6
Win	15.	29 December 1986	Brisbane	Grass	(Australia) Wendy Turnbull	(United States) Betsy Nagelsen (Australia) Elizabeth Smylie	6–4, 6–3
Win	16.	9 February 1987	San Francisco	Carpet (i)	(Australia) Wendy Turnbull	(United States) Zina Garrison (Argentina) Gabriela Sabatini	6–4, 7–6^{(7–4)}
Loss	15.	13 April 1987	Amelia Island	Clay	(Australia) Wendy Turnbull	(West Germany) Steffi Graf (Argentina) Gabriela Sabatini	6–3, 3–6, 5–7
Loss	16.	15 February 1988	Oakland	Carpet (i)	(Czechoslovakia) Jana Novotná	(United States) Rosie Casals (United States) Martina Navratilova	4–3, 4–6
Win	17.	6 March 1989	Indian Wells	Carpet (i)	(United States) Pam Shriver	(South Africa) Rosalyn Fairbank (United States) Gretchen Magers	6–3, 6–7^{(4–7)}, 6–3
Win	18.	3 April 1989	Hilton Head Island	Clay	(United States) Martina Navratilova	(United States) Mary-Lou Daniels (United States) Wendy White	6–4, 6–1
Win	19.	28 August 1989	US Open	Hard	(United States) Martina Navratilova	(United States) Mary Joe Fernández (United States) Pam Shriver	5–7, 6–4, 6–4
Loss	17.	23 October 1989	Brighton	Carpet (i)	(Czechoslovakia) Jana Novotná	(United States) Katrina Adams (United States) Lori McNeil	6–4, 6–7^{(7–9)}, 4–6
Loss	18.	1 January 1990	Brisbane	Hard	(United States) Pam Shriver	(Czechoslovakia) Jana Novotná (Czechoslovakia) Helena Suková	3–6, 1–6
Loss	19.	14 May 1990	Berlin	Clay	(Czechoslovakia) Jana Novotná	(Australia) Nicole Provis (South Africa) Elna Reinach	2–6, 1–6

== Grand Slam performance timelines ==
Key
W	F	SF	QF	#R	RR	Q#	DNQ	A	NH

(W) winner; (F) finalist; (SF) semifinalist; (QF) quarterfinalist; (#R) rounds 4, 3, 2, 1; (RR) round-robin stage; (Q#) qualification round; (DNQ) did not qualify; (A) absent; (NH) not held; (SR) strike rate (events won / competed); (W–L) win–loss record.

=== Singles ===
	Czechoslovakia										Australia			
Tournament	1978	1979	1980	1981	1982	1983	1984	1985	1986	1987	1988	1989	1990	Career SR
Australian Open	A	QF	W	QF	2R	2R	A	SF	NH	W	QF	4R	3R	2 / 10
French Open	2R	QF	SF	W	SF	QF	SF	QF	SF	2R	2R	1R	A	1 / 12
Wimbledon	A	4R	4R	F	2R	4R	SF	3R	F	A	3R	4R	2R	0 / 11
US Open	3R	2R	F	QF	F	QF	QF	W	4R	4R	A	3R	A	1 / 11
SR	0 / 2	0 / 4	1 / 4	1 / 4	0 / 4	0 / 4	0 / 3	1 / 4	0 / 3	1 / 3	0 / 3	0 / 4	0 / 2	4 / 44
Year End Ranking	45	17	4	5	7	9	3	3	4	5	29	14	NR	

=== Doubles ===
	Czechoslovakia										Australia			
Tournament	1978	1979	1980	1981	1982	1983	1984	1985	1986	1987	1988	1989	1990	Career SR
Australian Open	A	A	1R	2R	A	A	A	2R	NH	QF	QF	1R	1R	0 / 7
French Open	2R	QF	SF	3R	3R	QF	F	3R	SF	1R	3R	3R	A	0 / 12
Wimbledon	1R	2R	2R	A	2R	2R	QF	SF	F	A	2R	3R	A	0 / 10
US Open	A	A	3R	SF	3R	2R	3R	SF	F	3R	A	W	A	1 / 9
SR	0 / 2	0 / 2	0 / 4	0 / 3	0 / 3	0 / 3	0 / 3	0 / 4	0 / 3	0 / 3	0 / 3	1 / 4	0 / 1	1 / 38
Year End Ranking							11	6	7	12	60	17	46	

== Record against other top players ==
Mandlíková's win-loss record against certain players who have been ranked World No. 10 or higher is as follows:

Players who have been ranked World No. 1 are in boldface.

- (Germany) Bettina Bunge 16–1
- (Czechoslovakia) / (Czech Republic) Helena Suková 12–2
- (Germany) Sylvia Hanika 10–5
- (United States) Zina Garrison 9–4
- (Australia) Wendy Turnbull 9–6
- (United Kingdom) Sue Barker 8–0
- (United States) Pam Shriver 8–2
- (Romania) Virginia Ruzici 8–4
- (United States) Andrea Jaeger 8–6
- (United States) Barbara Potter 7–1
- (Socialist Federal Republic of Yugoslavia) Mima Jaušovec 7–4
- (United States) Kathy Jordan 7–5
- (United States) **Chris Evert** 7–21
- (Czechoslovakia) / (United States) **Martina Navratilova** 7–29
- (United States) Kathleen Horvath 6–0
- (United States) Lori McNeil 6–0
- (Germany) Claudia Kohde-Kilsch 6–3
- (United Kingdom) Jo Durie 5–2
- (Argentina) Gabriela Sabatini 5–2
- (Canada) Carling Bassett-Seguso 5–3
- (United States) Lisa Bonder 4–0
- (Netherlands) Betty Stöve 4–0
- (Hungary) Andrea Temesvári 4–0
- (United States) Bonnie Gadusek 4–1
- (Sweden) Catarina Lindqvist 4–1
- (Australia) Dianne Fromholtz 4–2
- (Bulgaria) / (Switzerland) Manuela Maleeva 4–3
- (United States) Mary Joe Fernández 3–0
- (United Kingdom) Virginia Wade 3–0
- (France) Nathalie Tauziat 2–0
- (United States) Kathy Rinaldi 2–1
- (United States) **Billie Jean King** 2–2
- (United States) **Tracy Austin** 2–7
- (United States) Rosemary Casals 1–0
- (France) Françoise Dürr 1–0
- (France) Julie Halard-Decugis 1–0
- (Bulgaria) Magdalena Maleeva 1–0
- (Soviet Union) / (Belarus) Natasha Zvereva 1–0
- (Germany) **Steffi Graf** 1–8
- (South Africa) Amanda Coetzer 0–1
- (Australia) **Evonne Goolagong Cawley** 0–1
- (Socialist Federal Republic of Yugoslavia) / (Federal Republic of Yugoslavia) / (United States) **Monica Seles** 0–2
