= 1981 Volvo Women's Cup =

- Date: August 24–30
- Edition: 4th
- Category: Category 3
- Draw: 56S / 32D
- Prize money: $100,000
- Surface: Hard / outdoor
- Location: Mahwah, New Jersey, U.S.
- Venue: Ramapo College

Champions

Singles
- (Czechoslovakia) Hana Mandlíková

Doubles
- (United States) Rosie Casals / (Australia) Wendy Turnbull
← 1980 ·	WTA New Jersey	· 1982 →

The 1981 Volvo Women's Cup was a women's tennis tournament played on outdoor hard courts at the Ramapo College in Mahwah, New Jersey in the United States, It was part of the Toyota International Series circuit of the 1981 WTA Tour and classified as a Category 3 event. It was the fourth edition of the tournament and was held from August 24 through August 30, 1981. Second-seeded Hana Mandlíková won her second consecutive singles title at the event and earned $20,000 first-prize money.

== Finals ==
=== Singles ===
(Czechoslovakia) Hana Mandlíková defeated (United States) Pam Casale 6–2, 6–2

- It was Mandlíková's 3rd singles title of the year and the 16th of her career.

=== Doubles ===
(United States) Rosie Casals / (Australia) Wendy Turnbull defeated (United States) Candy Reynolds / (Netherlands) Betty Stöve 6–2, 6–1

== Prize money ==
Event	W	F	SF	QF	Round of 16	Round of 32	Round of 64
Singles	$20,000	$10,000	$4,800	$2,050	$900	$475	$250
