= 1980 Volvo Women's Cup =

- Date: August 18–24
- Edition: 3rd
- Category: Colgate Series (AA)
- Draw: 56S / 32D
- Prize money: $100,000
- Surface: Hard / outdoor
- Location: Mahwah, New Jersey, U.S.
- Venue: Ramapo College

Champions

Singles
- (Czechoslovakia) Hana Mandlíková

Doubles
- (United States) Martina Navratilova (United States) Candy Reynolds
← 1979 ·	WTA New Jersey	· 1981 →

The 1980 Volvo Women's Cup was a women's tennis tournament played on outdoor hard courts at the Ramapo College in Mahwah, New Jersey in the United States, It was part of the Colgate Series circuit of the 1980 WTA Tour and classified as a category AA (Note: Tournaments with prize money for women of at least $100,000.) event. It was the third edition of the tournament and was held from August 18 through August 24, 1980. Fifth-seeded Hana Mandlíková won the singles title and earned $20,000 first-prize money.

== Finals ==
=== Singles ===
(Czechoslovakia) Hana Mandlíková defeated (United States) Andrea Jaeger 6–7^{(0–7)}, 6–2, 6–2

- It was Mandlíková's 1st singles title of the year and the 8th of her career.

=== Doubles ===
(United States) Martina Navratilova / (United States) Candy Reynolds defeated (United States) Pam Shriver / (Netherlands) Betty Stöve 4–6, 6–3, 6–1

== Prize money ==
Event	W	F	SF	QF	Round of 16	Round of 32	Round of 64
Singles	$20,000	$10,000	$4,800	$2,050	$1,000	$550	$250
