= 1982 Volvo Women's Cup =

- Date: August 23–29
- Edition: 5th
- Category: Category 3
- Draw: 56S / 32D
- Prize money: $100,000
- Surface: Hard / outdoor
- Location: Mahwah, New Jersey, U.S.
- Venue: Ramapo College

Champions

Singles
- (United States) Leigh-Anne Thompson

Doubles
- (United States) Barbara Potter / (United States) Sharon Walsh
| ← 1981 · | WTA New Jersey | · 1983 → |

The 1982 Volvo Women's Cup was a women's tennis tournament played on outdoor hard courts at the Ramapo College in Mahwah, New Jersey in the United States, It was part of the Toyota International Series circuit of the 1982 WTA Tour and classified as a Category 3 event. It was the fifth edition of the tournament and was held from August 23 through August 29, 1982. Unseeded Leigh-Anne Thompson won the singles title and earned $18,000 first-prize money.

== Finals ==
=== Singles ===
(United States) Leigh-Anne Thompson defeated (West Germany) Bettina Bunge 7–6^{(7–4)}, 6–3

- It was Thompson's only title of her career.

=== Doubles ===
(United States) Barbara Potter / (United States) Sharon Walsh defeated (United States) Rosie Casals / (Australia) Wendy Turnbull 6–1, 6–4

== Prize money ==
| Event | W | F | SF | QF | Round of 16 | Round of 32 | Round of 64 |
| Singles | $18,000 | $9,000 | $4,650 | $2,200 | $1,100 | $550 | $275 |
