= Leigh Thompson =

Leigh Thompson may refer to:

- Leigh-Anne Thompson, a retired American professional tennis player
- Leigh Thompson (academic), J. Jay Gerber Professor of Dispute Resolution & Organizations in the Kellogg School of Management at Northwestern University
