= Mariette Pakker =

Dutch tennis player and commentator

Mariëtte Pakker
- Country (sports): Netherlands
- Born: 16 September 1958 (age 68)

Grand Slam singles results
- French Open: Q1 (1980)
- Wimbledon: 1R (1979)
- US Open: Q1 (1981)

Grand Slam doubles results
- French Open: 2R (1981)
- US Open: 1R (1981)

Mariette Pakker (born 16 September 1958) is a Dutch tennis commentator and former professional player.

A multiple national champion in doubles, Pakker spent four years competing on the professional tour.

Pakker qualified for the singles main draw of the 1979 Wimbledon Championships, where she lost a close first round match to Bettina Bunge from West Germany.

As a doubles player she featured in the main draws of the French Open and US Open. At the 1981 US Open, she and partner Elly Vessies drew top seeds Martina Navratilova and Pam Shriver in the opening round.

Pakker now works as a tennis commentator, including for Eurosport and Fox Sports.
