= 1983 Virginia Slims of New Jersey =

- Date: August 22–28
- Edition: 6th
- Category: Category 2
- Draw: 56S / 32D
- Prize money: $125,000
- Surface: Hard / outdoor
- Location: Mahwah, New Jersey, U.S.
- Venue: Ramapo College

Champions

Singles
- (United Kingdom) Jo Durie

Doubles
- (United Kingdom) Jo Durie / (United States) Sharon Walsh
| ← 1982 · | WTA New Jersey | · 1984 → |

The 1983 Virginia Slims of New Jersey was a women's tennis tournament played on outdoor hard courts at the Ramapo College in Mahwah, New Jersey in the United States that was part of the Category 2 tier of the 1983 Virginia Slims World Championship Series. It was the sixth edition of the tournament and was held from August 22 through August 28, 1983. Sixth-seeded Jo Durie won the singles title and earned $22,000 first-prize money.

== Finals ==
=== Singles ===
(United Kingdom) Jo Durie defeated (Czechoslovakia) Hana Mandlíková 2–6, 7–5, 6–4

- It was Durie's 1st title of the year and the 1st of her career.

=== Doubles ===
(United Kingdom) Jo Durie / (United States) Sharon Walsh defeated (South Africa) Rosalyn Fairbank / (United States) Candy Reynolds 4–6, 7–5, 6–3

- It was Durie's 3rd title of the year and the 4th of her career. It was Walsh's 5th title of the year and the 16th of her career.

== Prize money ==
| Event | W | F | SF | QF | Round of 16 | Round of 32 | Round of 64 |
| Singles | $22,000 | $11,000 | $5,775 | $2,600 | $1,300 | $700 | $300 |
