= 1981 US Open – Women's doubles =

Women's doubles
- 1981 US Open

Final
- Champions: (United States) Kathy Jordan (United States) Anne Smith
- Runners-up: (United States) Rosemary Casals (Australia) Wendy Turnbull
- Score: 6–3, 6–3

Details
- Draw: 64
- Seeds: 16

Events
Singles	men	women		boys	girls
Doubles	men	women	mixed	boys	girls
WC Singles	men	women	quad
WC Doubles	men	women	quad
Legends	men	women	mixed
← 1980 ·	US Open	· 1982 →

Billie Jean King and Martina Navratilova were the defending champions but only Navratilova competed that year with Pam Shriver.

Navratilova and Shriver lost in the semifinals to Rosemary Casals and Wendy Turnbull.

Kathy Jordan and Anne Smith won in the final 6–3, 6–3 against Casals and Turnbull.

== Seeds ==
Champion seeds are indicated in bold text while text in italics indicates the round in which those seeds were eliminated.

1. (United States) Martina Navratilova / (United States) Pam Shriver (semifinals)
2. (United States) **Kathy Jordan** / (United States) **Anne Smith (champions)**
3. (United States) Rosemary Casals / (Australia) Wendy Turnbull (final)
4. n/a
5. (United States) Barbara Potter / (United States) Sharon Walsh (first round)
6. (United States) JoAnne Russell / (Romania) Virginia Ruzici (quarterfinals)
7. (South Africa) Rosalyn Fairbank / (South Africa) Tanya Harford (quarterfinals)
8. (United States) Andrea Jaeger / (United States) Candy Reynolds (second round)
9. (West Germany) Bettina Bunge / (West Germany) Claudia Kohde (quarterfinals)
10. (Czechoslovakia) Hana Mandlíková / (United States) Pam Teeguarden (semifinals)
11. (United States) Chris Evert-Lloyd / (Netherlands) Betty Stöve (third round)
12. (United States) Peanut Louie / (United States) Marita Redondo (first round)
13. (South Africa) Ilana Kloss / (United States) Betsy Nagelsen (third round)
14. (United States) Mary-Lou Piatek / (United States) Wendy White (third round)
15. (Canada) Marjorie Blackwood / (Australia) Susan Leo (first round)
16. (United States) Leslie Allen / (United Kingdom) Virginia Wade (second round)

== Draw ==
=== Key ===
- Q = Qualifier
- WC = Wild card
- LL = Lucky loser
- Alt = Alternate
- ITF = ITF entry
- PR = Protected ranking
- SR = Special ranking
- SE = Special exempt
- JE = Junior exempt
- JR = Junior Accelerator Programme entrant
- CO = College Accelerator Programme entrant
- NG = Next Gen Accelerator Program entrant
- w/o = Walkover
- r = Retired
- d = Defaulted

=== Finals ===
Semifinals
1	(United States) Martina Navratilova (United States) Pam Shriver	6	**6**	4
3	(United States) **Rosemary Casals** (Australia) **Wendy Turnbull**	**7**	4	**6**
10	(Czechoslovakia) Hana Mandlíková (United States) Pam Teeguarden	**6**	2	1
2	(United States) **Kathy Jordan** (United States) **Anne Smith**	3	**6**	**6**

Final
3	(United States) Rosemary Casals (Australia) Wendy Turnbull	3	3
2	(United States) **Kathy Jordan** (United States) **Anne Smith**	**6**	**6**

=== Top half ===
==== Section 1 ====
First round
1	(United States) **M Navratilova** (United States) **P Shriver**	**6**	**6**
(Netherlands) M Pakker (Netherlands) E Vessies	3	2
(United States) L Epstein (United States) J Portman	6	0
(United States) **D Desfor** (United States) **B Hallquist**	**7**	**6**
(Australia) D Fromholtz (United States) M Van Nostrand	1	1
(United States) **R Blount** (United States) **A Buchanan**	**6**	**6**
(United States) J Davis (United States) J Preyer	**6**	2	2
11	(United States) **C Evert-Lloyd** (Netherlands) **B Stöve**	4	**6**	**6**
9	(West Germany) **B Bunge** (West Germany) **C Kohde**	**6**	**6**
(South Africa) J Mundel (South Africa) S Rollinson	3	4
(United States) **K Jones** (United States) **B Norton**	**6**	**6**
(United States) L Gordon (United States) P Johnson	0	4
(United States) S Margolin (United States) N Yeargin	4	2
(United States) **A Henricksson** (United States) **T Lewis**	**6**	**6**
(United States) B A Dent (United States) L Forood	2	0
8	(United States) **A Jaeger** (United States) **C Reynolds**	**6**	**6**

Second round
1	(United States) **M Navratilova** (United States) **P Shriver**	4	**6**	**6**
(United States) D Desfor (United States) B Hallquist	**6**	2	1
(United States) R Blount (United States) A Buchanan	5	0
11	(United States) **C Evert-Lloyd** (Netherlands) **B Stöve**	**7**	**6**
9	(West Germany) **B Bunge** (West Germany) **C Kohde**	**7**	4	**6**
(United States) K Jones (United States) B Norton	5	**6**	4
(United States) **A Henricksson** (United States) **T Lewis**	w/o
8	(United States) A Jaeger (United States) C Reynolds

Third round
1	(United States) **M Navratilova** (United States) **P Shriver**	**6**	**6**
11	(United States) C Evert-Lloyd (Netherlands) B Stöve	2	1
9	(West Germany) **B Bunge** (West Germany) **C Kohde**	**6**	**6**
(United States) A Henricksson (United States) T Lewis	0	2

Quarterfinals
1	(United States) **M Navratilova** (United States) **P Shriver**	**6**	**6**
9	(West Germany) B Bunge (West Germany) C Kohde	1	3

==== Section 2 ====
First round
3	(United States) **R Casals** (Australia) **W Turnbull**	**7**	**6**
(Australia) A Minter (Australia) E Sayers	6	0
(New Zealand) **C Newton** (Australia) **B Remilton**	5	**7**	**7**
(Australia) N Gregory (Hungary) M Pinterová	**7**	6	6
(United States) **B Blaney** (Australia) **C O'Neil**	**6**	**6**
(Brazil) P Medrado (Chile) S Urroz	4	3
(Australia) D Freeman (Australia) S Saliba	2	0
13	(South Africa) **I Kloss** (United States) **B Nagelsen**	**6**	**6**
16	(United States) **L Allen** (United Kingdom) **V Wade**	**6**	**6**
(United States) E Burgin (United States) A M Fernandez	2	4
(United States) **S Mascarin** (United States) **A White**	**6**	**7**
(United States) J Nachand (Australia) P Whytcross	4	5
(United States) S Gordon (South Korea) D-H Lee	2	1
(United States) **S Collins** (United States) **K Horvath**	**6**	**6**
(United States) D Gilbert (United States) M Harper	2	3
6	(United States) **J Russell** (Romania) **V Ruzici**	**6**	**6**

Second round
3	(United States) **R Casals** (Australia) **W Turnbull**	**6**	**7**
(New Zealand) C Newton (Australia) B Remilton	1	6
(United States) B Blaney (Australia) C O'Neil	6	**7**	2
13	(South Africa) **I Kloss** (United States) **B Nagelsen**	**7**	6	**6**
16	(United States) L Allen (United Kingdom) V Wade	4	**6**	3
(United States) **S Mascarin** (United States) **A White**	**6**	3	**6**
(United States) S Collins (United States) K Horvath	2	5
6	(United States) **J Russell** (Romania) **V Ruzici**	**6**	**7**

Third round
3	(United States) **R Casals** (Australia) **W Turnbull**	**6**	**6**
13	(South Africa) I Kloss (United States) B Nagelsen	2	2
(United States) S Mascarin (United States) A White	**6**	6	5
6	(United States) **J Russell** (Romania) **V Ruzici**	3	**7**	**7**

Quarterfinals
3	(United States) **R Casals** (Australia) **W Turnbull**	**6**	**7**
6	(United States) J Russell (Romania) V Ruzici	4	6

=== Bottom half ===
==== Section 3 ====
First round
5	(United States) B Potter (United States) S Walsh	4	6
(United Kingdom) **J Durie** (United Kingdom) **A Hobbs**	**6**	**7**
(United States) **S Acker** (United States) **P Smith**	**6**	**6**
(United States) J DuVall (United States) J Filkoff	0	0
(Czechoslovakia) **Y Brzáková** (Czechoslovakia) **K Skronská**	**6**	**6**
(United States) R McCallum (United States) G Rush	4	4
(United Kingdom) G Coles (United Kingdom) D Jevans	1	1
10	(Czechoslovakia) **H Mandlíková** (United States) **P Teeguarden**	**6**	**6**
12	(United States) P Louie (United States) M Redondo	0	4
(Australia) **E Little** (South Africa) **Y Vermaak**	**6**	**6**
(United States) P Casale (United States) K Rinaldi	3	**6**	1
(United States) **L Antonoplis** (United States) **L Morse**	**6**	2	**6**
(United States) C Copeland (United States) A Moulton	5	4
(United States) **J Goodling** (United States) **J Harrington**	**7**	**6**
(Netherlands) K Moos (Netherlands) N Schutte	6	5
ALT	(United States) **K Gompert** (United States) **V Nelson**	**7**	**7**

Second round
(United Kingdom) **J Durie** (United Kingdom) **A Hobbs**	**6**	**6**
(United States) S Acker (United States) P Smith	3	4
(Czechoslovakia) Y Brzáková (Czechoslovakia) K Skronská	4	4
10	(Czechoslovakia) **H Mandlíková** (United States) **P Teeguarden**	**6**	**6**
(Australia) **E Little** (South Africa) **Y Vermaak**	**6**	**6**
(United States) L Antonoplis (United States) L Morse	4	4
(United States) J Goodling (United States) J Harrington	1	3
ALT	(United States) **K Gompert** (United States) **V Nelson**	**6**	**6**

Third round
(United Kingdom) J Durie (United Kingdom) A Hobbs	2	4
10	(Czechoslovakia) **H Mandlíková** (United States) **P Teeguarden**	**6**	**6**
(Australia) **E Little** (South Africa) **Y Vermaak**	4	**6**	**6**
ALT	(United States) K Gompert (United States) V Nelson	**6**	1	0

Quarterfinals
10	(Czechoslovakia) **H Mandlíková** (United States) **P Teeguarden**	**6**	**6**
(Australia) E Little (South Africa) Y Vermaak	3	1

==== Section 4 ====
First round
7	(South Africa) **R Fairbank** (South Africa) **T Harford**	**6**	**6**
(Czechoslovakia) I Budařová (Japan) N Sato	4	2
(United States) **Z Garrison** (United States) **A Leand**	**6**	5	**7**
(Netherlands) M Mesker (Netherlands) M van der Torre	4	**7**	5
(Socialist Federal Republic of Yugoslavia) **M Jaušovec** (West Germany) **R Tomanová**	**6**	**6**
(United States) C Baily (United States) C Watson	2	2
(United States) H Ludloff (West Germany) E Pfaff	4	1
14	(United States) **M-L Piatek** (United States) **W White**	**6**	**6**
15	(Canada) M Blackwood (Australia) S Leo	5	5
(United States) **F Hutnick** (United States) **R Richards**	**7**	**7**
(United States) **L duPont** (United States) **B Jordan**	**6**	**7**
(United States) K Sands (Peru) P Vásquez	3	5
(United States) **L Bonder** (United States) **B Herr**	**6**	**7**
(United States) K Steinmetz (Canada) A Walker	1	5
(United States) S McInerney (United States) D Morrison	0	0
2	(United States) **K Jordan** (United States) **A Smith**	**6**	**6**

Second round
7	(South Africa) **R Fairbank** (South Africa) **T Harford**	**6**	**6**
(United States) Z Garrison (United States) A Leand	1	3
(Socialist Federal Republic of Yugoslavia) M Jaušovec (West Germany) R Tomanová	5	4
14	(United States) **M-L Piatek** (United States) **W White**	**7**	**6**
(United States) **F Hutnick** (United States) **R Richards**	**7**	**6**
(United States) L duPont (United States) B Jordan	5	0
(United States) L Bonder (United States) B Herr	1	5
2	(United States) **K Jordan** (United States) **A Smith**	**6**	**7**

Third round
7	(South Africa) **R Fairbank** (South Africa) **T Harford**	4	**6**	**6**
14	(United States) M-L Piatek (United States) W White	**6**	4	4
(United States) F Hutnick (United States) R Richards	5	6
2	(United States) **K Jordan** (United States) **A Smith**	**7**	**7**

Quarterfinals
7	(South Africa) R Fairbank (South Africa) T Harford	4	4
2	(United States) **K Jordan** (United States) **A Smith**	**6**	**6**
