= 1977 Virginia Slims of Detroit =

- Date: February 22–27
- Edition: 6th
- Category: Virginia Slims circuit
- Draw: 32S / 16D
- Prize money: $100,000
- Surface: Carpet (Sporteze) / indoor
- Location: Detroit, Michigan, US
- Venue: Cobo Hall & Arena

Champions

Singles
- (United States) Martina Navratilova

Doubles
- (United States) Martina Navratilova / (Netherlands) Betty Stöve
← 1976 ·	Virginia Slims of Detroit	· 1978 →

The 1977 Virginia Slims of Detroit was a women's tennis tournament played on indoor carpet courts at the Cobo Hall & Arena in Detroit, Michigan in the United States that was part of the 1977 Virginia Slims World Championship Series. It was the sixth edition of the tournament and was held from February 22 through February 27, 1977. First-seeded Martina Navratilova won the singles title and earned $20,000 first-prize money.

== Finals ==
=== Singles ===
(United States) Martina Navratilova defeated (United Kingdom) Sue Barker 6–4, 6–4

- It was Navratilova's 4th singles title of the year and the 11th of her career.

=== Doubles ===
(United States) Martina Navratilova / (Netherlands) Betty Stöve defeated (United States) Janet Newberry / (United States) JoAnne Russell 6–3, 6–4

== Prize money ==
Event	W	F	SF	QF	Round of 16	Round of 32
Singles	$20,000	$10,000	$5,400	$2,500	$1,375	$775
