= 1983 Virginia Slims of Detroit =

- Date: October 3–9
- Edition: 12th
- Draw: 32S / 16D
- Prize money: $150,000
- Surface: Carpet (Sporteze) / indoor
- Location: Detroit, Michigan, U.S.
- Venue: Cobo Hall & Arena

Champions

Singles
- (Romania) Virginia Ruzici

Doubles
- (United States) Kathy Jordan / (United States) Barbara Potter
← 1982 ·	Virginia Slims of Detroit

The 1983 Virginia Slims of Detroit was a women's tennis tournament played on indoor carpet courts at the Cobo Hall & Arena in Detroit, Michigan in the United States that was part of the 1983 Virginia Slims World Championship Series. The tournament was held from October 3 through October 9, 1983. Eighth-seeded Virginia Ruzici won the singles title and earned $28,000 first-prize money.

== Finals ==
=== Singles ===
(Romania) Virginia Ruzici defeated (United States) Kathy Jordan 4–6, 6–4, 6–2

- It was Ruzici's 3rd title of the year and the 24th of her career.

=== Doubles ===
(United States) Kathy Jordan / (United States) Barbara Potter defeated (United States) Rosie Casals / (Australia) Wendy Turnbull 6–4, 6–1

- It was Jordan's 2nd title of the year and the 21st of her career. It was Potter's 3rd title of the year and the 15th of her career.

== Prize money ==
Event	W	F	SF	QF	Round of 16	Round of 32
Singles	$28,000	$14,000	$7,000	$3,350	$1,675	$825
