= 1974 Virginia Slims of Detroit =

- Date: February 20–24
- Edition: 3rd
- Category: Virginia Slims circuit
- Draw: 32S / 16D
- Prize money: $50,000
- Surface: Carpet (Sporteze) / indoor
- Location: Detroit, Michigan, US
- Venue: Cobo Hall & Arena

Champions

Singles
- (United States) Billie Jean King

Doubles
- (United States) Rosemary Casals / (United States) Billie Jean King
← 1973 ·	Virginia Slims of Detroit	· 1975 →

The 1974 Virginia Slims of Detroit was a women's tennis tournament played on indoor carpet courts at the Cobo Hall & Arena in Detroit, Michigan in the United States that was part of the 1974 Virginia Slims World Championship Series. It was the third edition of the tournament and was held from February 20 through February 24, 1974. First-seeded Billie Jean King won the singles title and earned $10,000 first-prize money.

== Finals ==
=== Singles ===
(United States) Billie Jean King defeated (United States) Rosemary Casals 6–1, 6–1

=== Doubles ===
(United States) Rosemary Casals / (United States) Billie Jean King defeated (France) Françoise Dürr / (Netherlands) Betty Stöve 2–6, 6–4, 7–5

== Prize money ==
Event	W	F	SF	QF	Round of 16	Round of 32
Singles	$10,000	$5,600	$2,800	$1,400	$700	$350
