= 1976 Virginia Slims of Detroit =

- Date: February 17–22
- Edition: 5th
- Category: Virginia Slims circuit
- Draw: 32S / 16D
- Prize money: $75,000
- Surface: Carpet (Sporteze) / indoor
- Location: Detroit, Michigan, US
- Venue: Cobo Hall & Arena

Champions

Singles
- (United States) Chris Evert

Doubles
- (United States) Mona Guerrant / (United States) Ann Kiyomura
← 1975 ·	Virginia Slims of Detroit	· 1977 →

The 1976 Virginia Slims of Detroit was a women's tennis tournament played on indoor carpet courts at the Cobo Hall & Arena in Detroit, Michigan in the United States that was part of the 1976 Virginia Slims World Championship Series. It was the fifth edition of the tournament and was held from February 17 through February 22, 1976. First-seeded Chris Evert won the singles title and earned $15,000 first-prize money.

== Finals ==
=== Singles ===
(United States) Chris Evert defeated (United States) Rosemary Casals 6–4, 6–2

- It was Evert's 3rd singles title of the year and the 58th of her career.

=== Doubles ===
(United States) Mona Guerrant / (United States) Ann Kiyomura defeated (United States) Chris Evert / (Netherlands) Betty Stöve 6–3, 6–4

== Prize money ==
Event	W	F	3rd	4th	QF	Round of 16	Round of 32
Singles	$15,000	$8,000	$4,650	$3,900	$1,900	$1,100	$550
