= 1978 Bergen County Classic =

- Date: 21–26 August
- Edition: 1st
- Category: Colgate Series (AA)
- Draw: 32S / 16D
- Prize money: $75,000
- Surface: Hard / outdoor
- Location: Mahwah, United States
- Venue: Ramapo College

Champions

Singles
- (United Kingdom) Virginia Wade

Doubles
- (South Africa) Ilana Kloss / (South Africa) Marise Kruger
WTA New Jersey	· 1979 →

The 1978 Bergen County Classic was a women's singles tennis tournament played on outdoor hard courts at the Ramapo College in Mahwah, New Jersey in the United States. The event was part of the AA (Note: Tournaments with prize money for the women of at least $75,000.) category of the 1978 Colgate Series. It was the inaugural edition of the tournament and was held from 21 September through 26 September 1978. First-seeded Virginia Wade won the singles title and earned $14,000 first-prize money.

== Finals ==
=== Singles ===
(United Kingdom) Virginia Wade defeated (Australia) Kerry Reid 1–6, 6–1, 6–4

- It was Wade's 2nd title of the year and the 54th of her career.

=== Doubles ===
(South Africa) Ilana Kloss / (South Africa) Marise Kruger defeated (United States) Barbara Potter / (Australia) Pam Whytcross 6–3, 6–1

== Prize money ==
Event	W	F	3rd	4th	QF	Round of 16	Round of 32
Singles	$14,000	$7,100	$4,200	$3,500	$1,850	$1,000	$550
