= 1982 Avon Championships of Detroit =

- Date: February 1–7
- Edition: 11th
- Category: Virginia Slims circuit
- Draw: 32S / 16D
- Prize money: $150,000
- Surface: Carpet (Sporteze) / indoor
- Location: Detroit, Michigan, US
- Venue: Cobo Hall & Arena

Champions

Singles
- (United States) Andrea Jaeger

Doubles
- (United States) Leslie Allen / (Australia) Wendy Turnbull
← 1981 ·	Virginia Slims of Detroit	· 1983 →

The 1982 Avon Championships of Detroit was a women's tennis tournament played on indoor carpet courts at the Cobo Hall & Arena in Detroit, Michigan in the United States that was part of the 1982 Avon Championships circuit. This was the 11th edition of the tournament and was held from February 1 through February 7, 1982. First-seeded Andrea Jaeger won the singles title and earned $30,000 in first-prize money.

== Finals ==
=== Singles ===
(United States) Andrea Jaeger defeated (Socialist Federal Republic of Yugoslavia) Mima Jaušovec 2–6, 6–4, 6–2

=== Doubles ===
(United States) Leslie Allen / (Socialist Federal Republic of Yugoslavia) Mima Jaušovec defeated (United States) Rosemary Casals / (Australia) Wendy Turnbull 6–4, 6–0

== Prize money ==
Event	W	F	SF	QF	Round of 16	Round of 32
Singles	$30,000	$15,000	$7,350	$3,600	$1,900	$1,100
