= Juan Núñez (tennis) =

Chilean tennis player and coach (born 1956)

- Country (sports): Chile
- Residence: Boca Raton, Florida
- Born: 23 September 1956 (age 69) Valparaíso, Chile
- Height: 1.91 m (6 ft 3 in)
- Plays: Right-handed

Singles
- Career record: 9–18
- Career titles: 0
- Highest ranking: No. 185 (22 December 1980)

Grand Slam singles results
- US Open: 1R (1981)

Doubles
- Career record: 3–20
- Career titles: 0

Grand Slam doubles results
- French Open: 1R (1977)
- US Open: 1R (1981)

Juan Núñez (born 23 September 1956) is a former professional tennis player and coach, from Chile.

== Playing career ==
Núñez partnered Alejandro Gattiker at the 1977 French Open but the pair were unable to get past the first round.

In 1979, Núñez was a singles quarter-finalist at the Santiago Grand Prix tournament, with wins over Fernando Luna and Andrés Gómez.

He played John McEnroe in the opening round of the 1981 US Open and claimed the first set in a tiebreak, before losing in four. In the doubles, Núñez and Fernando Maynetto lost in the first round. Also that year, he made the round of 16 in the singles draw at the Boston Pro Championships.

== Coaching ==
Núñez coached Chris Evert in the late 1980s, before joining Arantxa Sánchez Vicario in 1989. He was the coach of Sánchez Vicario, when the Spaniard won the 1989 French Open. After leaving Sánchez Vicario, he spent time coaching Brenda Schultz and Natasha Zvereva. In 1994, Gabriela Sabatini won the WTA Tour Championships, with Núñez as her coach.
