= Yvona Brzáková =

Czechoslovak tennis player

- Country (sports): Czechoslovakia
- Born: 23 April 1956 (age 70) Levoča, Czechoslovakia
- Retired: 1986
- Plays: Right-handed
- Prize money: $48,774

Singles
- Career record: 12–22

Grand Slam singles results
- French Open: 3R (1983)
- Wimbledon: 1R (1980, 1983)
- US Open: 1R (1981)

Doubles
- Career record: 8–15
- Career titles: 1 WTA

Grand Slam doubles results
- French Open: 2R (1983)
- Wimbledon: 1R (1980)
- US Open: 2R (1981)
Medal record
Representing Czechoslovakia
Summer Universiade
Silver medal – second place	1977 Sofia	Doubles

Yvona Brzáková (born 23 April 1956) is a former professional tennis player who competed for Czechoslovakia.

== Biography ==
Brzáková was born in Levoča, then a town in Czechoslovakia but now part of Slovakia. She won a doubles silver medal at the 1977 Summer Universiade, with Renáta Tomanová as her partner.

A right-handed player, Brzáková appeared in the doubles of two Federation Cup ties for Czechoslovakia in the early rounds of the 1980 World Group, winning both matches, against Hungarian and Yugoslavian pairings. The Czechoslovak team made it through to the semi-finals, but Brzáková didn't feature.

During the 1980s she played professionally on the WTA Tour and won one title, partnering Kateřina Skronská in the doubles at the Austrian Open Kitzbühel in 1982. Her best grand slam performances was a third round appearance in the singles at the 1983 French Open, where she beat Pilar Vásquez and Renee Blount to make the final 32.

After retiring from the WTA Tour, Brzáková played and coached in Germany in the 1990s. She has since coached in Prague.

== WTA Tour finals ==
=== Doubles (1–0) ===
Result	Date	Tournament	Surface	Partner	Opponents	Score
Win	Jul 1982	Kitzbühel, Austria	Clay	(Czechoslovakia) Kateřina Skronská	(United States) Courtney Lord (United States) Jill Patterson	6–1, 7–5
