= 1975 Virginia Slims of Detroit =

- Date: February 18–22
- Edition: 4th
- Category: Virginia Slims circuit
- Draw: 32S / 16D
- Prize money: $75,000
- Surface: Carpet (Sporteze) / indoor
- Location: Detroit, Michigan, U.S.
- Venue: Cobo Hall & Arena

Champions

Singles
- (Australia) Evonne Goolagong

Doubles
- (Australia) Lesley Hunt / (Czechoslovakia) Martina Navratilova
| ← 1974 · | Virginia Slims of Detroit | · 1976 → |

The 1975 Virginia Slims of Detroit was a women's tennis tournament played on indoor carpet courts at the Cobo Hall & Arena in Detroit, Michigan in the United States that was part of the 1975 Virginia Slims World Championship Series. It was the fourth edition of the tournament and was held from February 18 through February 22, 1975. First-seeded Evonne Goolagong won the singles title and earned $15,000 first-prize money.

== Finals ==
=== Singles ===
(Australia) Evonne Goolagong defeated (Australia) Margaret Court 6–3, 3–6, 6–3

- It was Goolagong's 2nd singles title of the year and the 60th of her career.

=== Doubles ===
(Australia) Lesley Hunt / (Czechoslovakia) Martina Navratilova defeated (France) Françoise Dürr / (Netherlands) Betty Stöve 2–6, 7–5, 6–2

== Prize money ==
| Event | W | F | 3rd | 4th | QF | Round of 16 | Round of 32 |
| Singles | $15,000 | $8,000 | $4,600 | $3,800 | $2,100 | $1,100 | $550 |
