= 1979 Avon Championships of Detroit =

- Date: February 19–25
- Edition: 8th
- Category: Virginia Slims circuit
- Draw: 32S/16D
- Prize money: $150,000
- Surface: Carpet (Sporteze) / indoor
- Location: Detroit, USA
- Venue: Cobo Hall & Arena

Champions

Singles
- (Australia) Wendy Turnbull

Doubles
- (United States) Wendy Turnbull / (Netherlands) Betty Stöve
← 1978 ·	Virginia Slims of Detroit	· 1980 →

The 1979 Avon Championships of Detroit was a women's tennis tournament played on indoor carpet courts at the Cobo Hall & Arena in Detroit, Michigan in the United States that was part of the 1979 Avon Championships circuit. It was the eighth edition of the tournament and was held from February 19 through February 25, 1979. Fifth-seeded Wendy Turnbull won the singles title and earned $30,000 first-prize money.

== Finals ==
=== Singles ===
(Australia) Wendy Turnbull defeated (Romania) Virginia Ruzici 7–5, 1–6, 7–6^{(7–4)}

- It was Turnbull's first title of the year and the third of her career.

=== Doubles ===
(Australia) Wendy Turnbull / (Netherlands) Betty Stöve defeated (United Kingdom) Sue Barker / (United States) Ann Kiyomura 6–4, 7–6

== Prize money ==
Event	W	F	3rd	4th	QF	Round of 16	Round of 32
Singles	$30,000	$15,000	$7,500	$7,200	$3,500	$1,750	$1,000
