= 1979 Volvo Tennis Cup =

- Date: 20–26 August
- Edition: 2nd
- Category: Colgate Series (AA)
- Draw: 32S / 16D
- Prize money: $75,000
- Surface: Hard / outdoor
- Location: Mahwah, United States
- Venue: Ramapo College

Champions

Singles
- (United States) Chris Evert

Doubles
- (United States) Tracy Austin / (Netherlands) Betty Stöve
| ← 1978 · | WTA New Jersey | · 1980 → |

The 1979 Volvo Tennis Cup was a women's singles tennis tournament played on outdoor hard courts at the Ramapo College in Mahwah, New Jersey in the United States. The event was part of the AA (Note: Tournaments with prize money for the women of at least $75,000.) category of the 1979 Colgate Series. It was the second edition of the tournament and was held from 20 September through 26 September 1979. First-seeded Chris Evert won the singles title and earned $14,000 first-prize money.

== Finals ==
=== Singles ===
(United States) Chris Evert defeated (United States) Tracy Austin 6–7^{(2–7)}, 6–4, 6–1

- It was Evert's 8th singles title of the year and the 93rd of her career.

=== Doubles ===
(United States) Tracy Austin / (Netherlands) Betty Stöve defeated (Socialist Federal Republic of Yugoslavia) Mima Jaušovec / (Czechoslovakia) Regina Maršíková 7–6^{(7–4)}, 2–6, 6–4

== Prize money ==
| Event | W | F | SF | QF | Round of 16 | Round of 32 |
| Singles | $14,000 | $7,000 | $3,400 | $1,800 | $900 | $450 |
