= 1978 Virginia Slims of Detroit =

- Date: February 21–26
- Edition: 7th
- Category: Virginia Slims circuit
- Draw: 32S / 16D
- Prize money: $100,000
- Surface: Carpet (Sporteze) / indoor
- Location: Detroit, Michigan, US
- Venue: Cobo Hall & Arena

Champions

Singles
- (United States) Martina Navratilova

Doubles
- (United States) Billie Jean King / (United States) Martina Navratilova
| ← 1977 · | Virginia Slims of Detroit | · 1979 → |

The 1978 Virginia Slims of Detroit was a women's tennis tournament played on indoor carpet courts at the Cobo Hall & Arena in Detroit, Michigan in the United States that was part of the 1978 Virginia Slims World Championship Series. It was the seventh edition of the tournament and was held from February 21 through February 26, 1978. First-seeded Martina Navratilova won her second consecutive singles title at the event and earned $20,000 first-prize money.

== Finals ==
=== Singles ===
(United States) Martina Navratilova defeated (Australia) Dianne Fromholtz 6–3, 6–2

- It was Navratilova's 6th singles title of the year and the 19th of her career.

=== Doubles ===
(United States) Billie Jean King / (United States) Martina Navratilova defeated (Australia) Kerry Reid / (Australia) Wendy Turnbull 6–3, 6–4

== Prize money ==
| Event | W | F | 3rd | 4th | QF | Round of 16 | Round of 32 |
| Singles | $20,000 | $10,500 | $6,300 | $5,500 | $2,800 | $1,550 | $850 |
