= 1981 Avon Championships of Detroit =

- Date: February 2–8
- Edition: 10th
- Category: Virginia Slims circuit
- Draw: 32S / 16D
- Prize money: $125,000
- Surface: Carpet (Sporteze) / indoor
- Location: Detroit, USA
- Venue: Cobo Hall & Arena

Champions

Singles
- (United States) Leslie Allen

Doubles
- (United States) Rosemary Casals / (Australia) Wendy Turnbull
← 1980 ·	Virginia Slims of Detroit	· 1982 →

The 1981 Avon Championships of Detroit was a women's tennis tournament played on indoor carpet courts at the Cobo Hall & Arena in Detroit, Michigan in the United States that was part of the 1981 Avon Championships circuit. It was the tenth edition of the tournament and was held from February 2 through February 8, 1981. Unseeded Leslie Allen won the singles title (Note: Allen became the first African American woman to win a significant pro tennis tournament since Althea Gibson in 1958, although Renee Blount is also credited with this feat as she won the Futures of Columbus in 1979.) and earned $24,000 first-prize money.

== Finals ==
=== Singles ===
(United States) Leslie Allen defeated (Czechoslovakia) Hana Mandlíková 6–4, 6–4

- It was Allen's only singles title of her career.

=== Doubles ===
(United States) Rosemary Casals / (Australia) Wendy Turnbull defeated (Czechoslovakia) Hana Mandlíková / (Netherlands) Betty Stöve 6–4, 6–2

== Prize money ==
Event	W	F	3rd	4th	QF	Round of 16	Round of 32
Singles	$24,000	$12,000	$6,500	$6,200	$3,000	$1,600	$900
