= 1973 Virginia Slims of Detroit =

- Date: March 1–4
- Edition: 2nd
- Category: Virginia Slims circuit
- Draw: 16S / 8D
- Prize money: $25,000
- Surface: Carpet (Sporteze) / indoor
- Location: Detroit, Michigan, US
- Venue: Cobo Hall & Arena

Champions

Singles
- (Australia) Margaret Court

Doubles
- (United States) Rosemary Casals / (United States) Billie Jean King
← 1972 ·	Virginia Slims of Detroit	· 1974 →

The 1973 Virginia Slims of Detroit was a women's tennis tournament played on indoor carpet courts at the Cobo Hall & Arena in Detroit, Michigan in the United States that was part of the 1973 Virginia Slims World Championship Series. It was the second edition of the tournament and was held from March 1 through March 4, 1973. First-seeded Margaret Court won the singles title and earned $6,000 first-prize money.

== Finals ==
=== Singles ===
(Australia) Margaret Court defeated (Australia) Kerry Melville 7–6^{(5–4)}, 6–3

=== Doubles ===
(United States) Rosemary Casals / (United States) Billie Jean King defeated (Australia) Karen Krantzcke / (Netherlands) Betty Stöve 6–3, 3–6, 6–1

== Prize money ==
Event	W	F	3rd	4th	QF	Round of 16
Singles	$6,000	$3,000	$1,900	$1,600	$1,000	$0
