= 1980 Avon Championships of Detroit =

- Date: February 18–24
- Edition: 9th
- Category: Virginia Slims circuit
- Draw: 64S/16D
- Prize money: $200,000
- Surface: Carpet (Sporteze) / indoor
- Location: Detroit, USA
- Venue: Cobo Hall & Arena

Champions

Singles
- (United States) Billie Jean King

Doubles
- (United States) Billie Jean King / (South Africa) Ilana Kloss
← 1979 ·	Virginia Slims of Detroit	· 1981 →

The 1980 Avon Championships of Detroit was a women's tennis tournament played on indoor carpet courts at the Cobo Hall & Arena in Detroit, Michigan in the United States that was part of the 1980 Avon Championships circuit. It was the ninth edition of the tournament and was held from February 18 through February 24, 1980. Second-seeded Billie Jean King won the singles title and earned $35,000 first-prize money.

== Finals ==
=== Singles ===
(United States) Billie Jean King defeated (Australia) Evonne Goolagong Cawley 6–3, 6–0

- It was King's first title of the year and the 124th of her career.

=== Doubles ===
(United States) Billie Jean King / (South Africa) Ilana Kloss defeated (United States) Kathy Jordan / (United States) Anne Smith 3–6, 6–3, 6–2

== Prize money ==
Event	W	F	3rd	4th	QF	Round of 16	Round of 32	Round of 64
Singles	$35,000	$17,000	$9,000	$8,800	$4,250	$2,100	$1,000	$500
