= 1981 US Open – Women's singles =

Women's singles
- 1981 US Open

Final
- Champion: (United States) Tracy Austin
- Runner-up: (United States) Martina Navratilova
- Score: 1–6, 7–6^{(7–4)}, 7–6^{(7–1)}

Details
- Draw: 128
- Seeds: 16

Events
Singles	men	women		boys	girls
Doubles	men	women	mixed	boys	girls
WC Singles	men	women	quad
WC Doubles	men	women	quad
Legends	men	women	mixed
← 1980 ·	US Open	· 1982 →

Tracy Austin defeated Martina Navratilova in the final, 1–6, 7–6^{(7–4)}, 7–6^{(7–1)} to win the women's singles tennis title at the 1981 US Open. It was her second US Open title and second and last major singles title.

Chris Evert was the defending champion, but lost in the semifinals to Navratilova. The loss ended Evert's streak of six consecutive US Open finals.

== Seeds ==
The seeded players are listed below. Tracy Austin is the champion; others show the round in which they were eliminated.

1. (United States) Chris Evert (semifinalist)
2. (United States) Andrea Jaeger (second round)
3. (United States) Tracy Austin (champion)
4. (United States) Martina Navratilova (finalist)
5. (Czechoslovakia) Hana Mandlíková (quarterfinalist)
6. (West Germany) Sylvia Hanika (quarterfinalist)
7. (Australia) Wendy Turnbull (third round)
8. (United States) Pam Shriver (fourth round)
9. (Romania) Virginia Ruzici (third round)
10. (Socialist Federal Republic of Yugoslavia) Mima Jaušovec (second round)
11. (United States) Barbara Potter (semifinalist)
12. (West Germany) Bettina Bunge (fourth round)
13. (Czechoslovakia) Regina Maršíková (first round)
14. (United States) Kathy Jordan (fourth round)
15. (United Kingdom) Sue Barker (second round)
16. (Australia) Dianne Fromholtz (first round)

== Draw ==
This edition of the US Open was the first time that the women's singles tournament featured a 128-player draw.

=== Key ===
- Q = Qualifier
- WC = Wild card
- LL = Lucky loser
- r = Retired

=== Final eight ===
Quarterfinals
1	(United States) Chris Evert	6	6
5	(Czechoslovakia) Hana Mandlíková	1	3
4	(United States) Martina Navratilova	7	6
(United States) Anne Smith	5	4
6	(West Germany) Sylvia Hanika	4	3
3	(United States) Tracy Austin	6	6
Q	(United States) Barbara Gerken	5	5
11	(United States) Barbara Potter	7	7

Semifinals
1	(United States) Chris Evert	5	6	4
4	(United States) Martina Navratilova	7	4	6
3	(United States) Tracy Austin	6	6
11	(United States) Barbara Potter	1	3

Finals
4	(United States) Martina Navratilova	6	6^{4}	6^{1}
3	(United States) Tracy Austin	1	7^{7}	7^{7}

=== Earlier rounds ===
==== Section 1 ====
First round
1	(United States) Evert	6	6
(United States) Keil	1	1
(United States) Latham	6	6
(Australia) Saliba	1	2
(United States) Louie	6	6
(United Kingdom) Jevans	3	0
(United States) Moulton	6	6
(Netherlands) Stöve	2	0
(United States) Jones	6	6
(Hungary) Pinterová	3	4
Q	(United States) Thompson	6	6
(United States) Collins	4	3
(United States) Kiyomura	7	7
(Netherlands) Van der Torre	5	5
12	(West Germany) Bunge	6	6
(United States) Louie	2	1

Second round
1	(United States) Evert	6	6
(United States) Latham	0	1
(United States) Louie	3	5
(United States) Moulton	6	7
(United States) Jones	1	1
Q	(United States) Thompson	6	6
(United States) Kiyomura	3	6	3
12	(West Germany) Bunge	6	3	6

Third round
1	(United States) Evert	6	6
(United States) Moulton	3	0
Q	(United States) Thompson	6	6	3
12	(West Germany) Bunge	2	7	6

Fourth round
1	(United States) Evert	6	6
12	(West Germany) Bunge	2	0

==== Section 2 ====
First round
9	(Romania) Ruzici	6	6
(United States) White	2	1
(United States) Burgin	6	6
(United States) Antonoplis	3	3
(United States) Mascarin	3	6	6
(United States) Yeargin	6	2	4
(South Korea) Lee	6	6
(Australia) Leo	3	4
(United States) Jordan	7	6
Q	(United States) Hutnick	5	1
(United Kingdom) Coles	6	6
(United States) McInerney	3	0
(United States) Reynolds	6	6
(United States) Sands	3	0
5	(Czechoslovakia) Mandlíková	6	7	6
(United States) Piatek	7	6	3

Second round
9	(Romania) Ruzici	5	7	6
(United States) Burgin	7	5	2
(United States) Mascarin	7	4	6
(South Korea) Lee	6	6	7
(United States) Jordan	3	6
(United Kingdom) Coles	6	7
(United States) Reynolds	4	4
5	(Czechoslovakia) Mandlíková	6	6

Third round
9	(Romania) Ruzici	1	6	5
(South Korea) Lee	6	4	7
(United Kingdom) Coles	2	1
5	(Czechoslovakia) Mandlíková	6	6

Fourth round
(South Korea) Lee	1	0
5	(Czechoslovakia) Mandlíková	6	6

==== Section 3 ====
First round
4	(United States) Navratilova	6	6
(Australia) Gregory	0	1
(United States) White	4	6	6
(Switzerland) Pasquale	6	1	2
(Canada) Blackwood	6	6
(United States) Steinmetz	4	4
(United States) Russell	1	6	6
(United States) Bonder	6	3	3
(South Africa) Harford	6	6
(Czechoslovakia) Brzáková	4	2
(France) Vanier	1	6	6
(United States) Allen	6	2	3
(France) Tanvier	6	5	6
(Peru) Vásquez	2	7	1
14	(United States) Jordan	6	6
(Australia) Little	0	1

Second round
4	(United States) Navratilova	6	6
(United States) White	2	3
(Canada) Blackwood	2	4
(United States) Russell	6	6
(South Africa) Harford	2	6	6
(France) Vanier	6	2	7
(France) Tanvier	1	1
14	(United States) Jordan	6	6

Third round
4	(United States) Navratilova	6	6
(United States) Russell	2	1
(France) Vanier	2	1
14	(United States) Jordan	6	6

Fourth round
4	(United States) Navratilova	6	6
14	(United States) Jordan	0	1

==== Section 4 ====
First round
(United States) Smith	6	6
16	(Australia) Fromholtz	3	3
(United States) McCallum	6	6
(United States) Preyer	2	3
(United States) Doherty	7	6
(Japan) Sato	5	1
(United States) Portman	6	7
LL	(United States) Davis	2	5
(Czechoslovakia) Tomanová	6	6
(United States) Forood	3	3
(United States) Nelson	6	1	7
(United States) Herr	2	6	6
(United States) DuVall	3	6	6
(United States) Margolin	6	4	0
8	(United States) Shriver	6	6
(United States) Gilbert	1	0

Second round
(United States) Smith	6	6
(United States) McCallum	0	0
(United States) Doherty	5	6
(United States) Portman	7	6
(Czechoslovakia) Tomanová	6	6
(United States) Nelson	4	2
(United States) DuVall	0	3
8	(United States) Shriver	6	6

Third round
(United States) Smith	6	6
(United States) Portman	1	0
(Czechoslovakia) Tomanová	3	2
8	(United States) Shriver	6	6

Fourth round
(United States) Smith	6	1	7
8	(United States) Shriver	4	6	5

==== Section 5 ====
First round
6	(West Germany) Hanika	6	6
(Australia) Remilton	2	2
(United States) Blount	6	6
LL	(United States) Gordon	2	0
(Netherlands) Mesker	6	6
(Czechoslovakia) Skronská	3	2
(Netherlands) Vessies	6	6
(United States) Fernandez	4	4
(United States) Mundel	7	6
Q	(United States) Hepner	5	1
(United Kingdom) Wade	6	6	6
(United States) Teeguarden	3	7	2
(United States) Walsh	6	6
(United States) Cummings	1	3
15	(United Kingdom) Barker	6	4	6
(United States) duPont	4	6	3

Second round
6	(West Germany) Hanika	7	6
(United States) Blount	5	2
(Netherlands) Mesker	6	6
(Netherlands) Vessies	2	2
(United States) Mundel	1	3
(United Kingdom) Wade	6	6
(United States) Walsh	5	6
15	(United Kingdom) Barker	7	3^{r}

Third round
6	(West Germany) Hanika	4	6	6
(Netherlands) Mesker	6	1	2
(United Kingdom) Wade	5	6	3
(United States) Walsh	7	4	6

Fourth round
6	(West Germany) Hanika	6	7
(United States) Walsh	2	5

==== Section 6 ====
First round
(United States) Casals	6	6
13	(Czechoslovakia) Maršíková	2	2
LL	(United States) Appelbaum	4	6	6
(Australia) Sayers	6	3	2
(United States) Morrison	0	6	6
(Australia) Minter	6	3	3
(United States) Acker	7	6
(United States) Dent	6	4
(United States) Casale	6	6
(Czechoslovakia) Budařová	2	1
Q	(United States) Gompert	7	6
(Brazil) Medrado	5	3
(United States) Nagelsen	7	6
(United States) Baily	5	3
3	(United States) Austin	6	6
(United Kingdom) Hobbs	1	2

Second round
(United States) Casals	6	6
LL	(United States) Appelbaum	0	2
(United States) Morrison	4	6
(United States) Acker	6	6
(United States) Casale	6	6
Q	(United States) Gompert	4	0
(United States) Nagelsen	3	0
3	(United States) Austin	6	6

Third round
(United States) Casals	3	6	6
(United States) Acker	6	1	4
(United States) Casale	3	0
3	(United States) Austin	6	6

Fourth round
(United States) Casals	1	3
3	(United States) Austin	6	6

==== Section 7 ====
First round
7	(Australia) Turnbull	3	6	6
(United States) Garrison	6	3	2
(Romania) Romanov	2	6	6
Q	(United States) Mochizuki	6	1	0
Q	(United States) Gerken	6	6
(South Africa) Fairbank	3	4
(United States) Buchanan	6	6
(West Germany) Pfaff	3	2
(United States) Hallquist	6	3	6
(United States) Lewis	4	6	2
(United Kingdom) Durie	6	6
(United States) Desfor	3	3
(United States) Horvath	7	3	7
(United States) Rinaldi	5	6	5
10	(Socialist Federal Republic of Yugoslavia) Jaušovec	6	6
(Peru) Arraya	2	2

Second round
7	(Australia) Turnbull	6	6
(Romania) Romanov	1	3
Q	(United States) Gerken	6	7
(United States) Buchanan	4	5
(United States) Hallquist	3	3
(United Kingdom) Durie	6	6
(United States) Horvath	6	6	6
10	(Socialist Federal Republic of Yugoslavia) Jaušovec	3	7	3

Third round
7	(Australia) Turnbull	5	3
Q	(United States) Gerken	7	6
(United Kingdom) Durie	6	3	6
(United States) Horvath	4	6	4

Fourth round
Q	(United States) Gerken	7	6
(United Kingdom) Durie	6	1

==== Section 8 ====
First round
11	(United States) Potter	6	6	6
(West Germany) Kohde	7	1	2
(South Africa) Rollinson	6	6
Q	(United Kingdom) Brasher	4	2
(United States) Morse	6	6
(Australia) Freeman	3	2
(United States) Smith	6	6
(United States) Gerulaitis	4	4
(South Africa) Vermaak	2	6	6
(United States) Norton	6	1	2
(United States) Harrington	6	6
LL	(Hungary) Klein	0	3
(United States) Leand	6	2	7
(United States) Richards	4	6	5
2	(United States) Jaeger	6	6
Q	(France) Calleja	1	0

Second round
11	(United States) Potter	6	6
(South Africa) Rollinson	3	2
(United States) Morse	6	6
(United States) Smith	2	4
(South Africa) Vermaak	4	6	6
(United States) Harrington	6	1	6
(United States) Leand	1	7	6
2	(United States) Jaeger	6	5	3

Third round
11	(United States) Potter	4	6	7
(United States) Morse	6	2	5
(United States) Harrington	4	3
(United States) Leand	6	6

Fourth round
11	(United States) Potter	6	7	6
(United States) Leand	7	6	3

== See also ==
- Evert–Navratilova rivalry

Preceded by 1981 Wimbledon Championships – Women's singles	Grand Slam women's singles	Succeeded by 1981 Australian Open – Women's singles
