= Lucy Gordon (tennis) =

American tennis player

- Country (sports): United States

Singles

Grand Slam singles results
- Australian Open: Q1 (1981)
- French Open: Q1 (1982)
- Wimbledon: Q1 (1983)
- US Open: 1R (1981)

Doubles

Grand Slam doubles results
- French Open: 1R (1983)
- Wimbledon: 1R (1983)
- US Open: 3R (1982)

Lucy Gordon is an American former professional tennis player.

A native of Coronado, California, Gordon played collegiate tennis for the UCLA Bruins. She won the doubles title at the U.S. national amateur clay court championships in 1979 (with Sheila McInerney).

Gordon made the 1981 US Open singles main draw as a lucky loser from qualifying and was beaten in the first round by Renee Blount. The following year she and partner Patrizia Murgo reached the US Open round of 16 in doubles.
