= 1981 US Open – Men's doubles =

Men's doubles
- 1981 US Open

Final
- Champion: (United States) Peter Fleming (United States) John McEnroe
- Runner-up: (Switzerland) Heinz Günthardt (Australia) Peter McNamara
- Score: W/O

Details
- Draw: 64
- Seeds: 16

Events
Singles	men	women		boys	girls
Doubles	men	women	mixed	boys	girls
WC Singles	men	women	quad
WC Doubles	men	women	quad
Legends	men	women	mixed
← 1980 ·	US Open	· 1982 →

The men's doubles tournament at the 1981 US Open was held on September 1–13, 1981 on the outdoor hard courts at the USTA National Tennis Center in New York City, United States. Heinz Günthardt and Peter McNamara forfeited the title to Peter Fleming and John McEnroe in the final.

== Seeds ==
1. (United States) John McEnroe / (United States) Peter Fleming (champions)
2. (Switzerland) Heinz Günthardt / (Australia) Peter McNamara (final)
3. (Mexico) Raúl Ramírez / (United States) Van Winitsky (second round)
4. (United States) Marty Riessen / (United States) Sherwood Stewart (first round)
5. (United States) Bruce Manson / (United States) Brian Teacher (first round)
6. (United States) Fritz Buehning / (United States) Ferdi Taygan (semifinals)
7. (South Africa) Kevin Curren / (United States) Steve Denton (quarterfinals)
8. (United States) Victor Amaya / (United States) Hank Pfister (quarterfinals)
9. (Poland) Wojciech Fibak / (United States) Stan Smith (first round)
10. (United States) Terry Moor / (United States) Eliot Teltscher (third round)
11. (United States) Tim Gullikson / (South Africa) Bernard Mitton (second round)
12. (South Africa) Johan Kriek / (South Africa) Frew McMillan (first round)
13. (United States) Andrew Pattison / (United States) Butch Walts (first round)
14. (Romania) Ilie Năstase / (Italy) Adriano Panatta (first round)
15. (South Africa) Raymond Moore / (United States) Erik van Dillen (third round)
16. (South Africa) Eddie Edwards / (United States) Craig Edwards (first round)

== Draw ==
=== Key ===
- Q = Qualifier
- WC = Wild card
- LL = Lucky loser
- Alt = Alternate
- ITF = ITF entry
- PR = Protected ranking
- SR = Special ranking
- SE = Special exempt
- JE = Junior exempt
- JR = Junior Accelerator Programme entrant
- CO = College Accelerator Programme entrant
- NG = Next Gen Accelerator Program entrant
- w/o = Walkover
- r = Retired
- d = Defaulted

=== Finals ===
Quarterfinals
1	(United States) Peter Fleming (United States) John McEnroe	6	6	7
7	(South Africa) Kevin Curren (United States) Steve Denton	1	2	5
(United States) Mike Cahill (United States) Tom Gullikson	5	6	6	6	3
(Australia) John Newcombe (Australia) Fred Stolle	7	7	3	4	6
6	(United States) Fritz Buehning (United States) Ferdi Taygan	3	6	6	6	6
(United States) Lloyd Bourne (United States) Matt Mitchell	6	3	7	4	3
8	(United States) Victor Amaya (United States) Hank Pfister	4	2	4
2	(Switzerland) Heinz Günthardt (Australia) Peter McNamara	6	6	6

Semifinals
1	(United States) Peter Fleming (United States) John McEnroe	6	6	5	6	7
(Australia) John Newcombe (Australia) Fred Stolle	2	2	7	7	6
6	(United States) Fritz Buehning (United States) Ferdi Taygan	6	6	4
2	(Switzerland) Heinz Günthardt (Australia) Peter McNamara	7	7	6

Final
1	(United States) Peter Fleming (United States) John McEnroe	w/o
2	(Switzerland) Heinz Günthardt (Australia) Peter McNamara

=== Top half ===
==== Section 1 ====
First round
1	(United States) P Fleming (United States) J McEnroe	6	7	6
(United States) J Hayes (United States) K Kerns	7	6	3
(United States) D Ralston (United States) R Tanner	6	3	6
(Australia) S Ball (Australia) R Case	4	6	3
(United States) J Austin (United States) F McNair	6	6
(United States) M Purcell (United States) V Van Patten	3	3
10	(United States) T Moor (United States) E Teltscher	6	4	6
(United States) S Carnahan (United States) G Petrovic	3	6	3
(United States) T Giammalva (United States) S Giammalva	6	6
14	(Romania) I Năstase (Italy) A Panatta	2	2
(Australia) D Carter (Paraguay) F González	6	7
(United States) M Davis (United States) C Dunk	3	5
(United States) M Estep (United States) B Scanlon	7	7
(United Kingdom) J Lloyd (United States) N Saviano	5	5
7	(South Africa) K Curren (United States) S Denton	6	6
(United States) A Kohlberg (India) S Menon	3	3

Second round
1	(United States) P Fleming (United States) J McEnroe	6	6
(United States) D Ralston (United States) R Tanner	4	4
(United States) J Austin (United States) F McNair	2	6	4
10	(United States) T Moor (United States) E Teltscher	6	3	6
(United States) T Giammalva (United States) S Giammalva	7	6	6
(Australia) D Carter (Paraguay) F González	6	7	7
(United States) M Estep (United States) B Scanlon	6	5
7	(South Africa) K Curren (United States) S Denton	7	7

Third round
1	(United States) P Fleming (United States) J McEnroe	2	7	2	6	6
10	(United States) T Moor (United States) E Teltscher	6	6	6	3	2
(Australia) D Carter (Paraguay) F González	7	7	4	6
7	(South Africa) K Curren (United States) S Denton	5	5	6	1

Quarterfinals
1	(United States) P Fleming (United States) J McEnroe	6	6	7
7	(South Africa) K Curren (United States) S Denton	1	2	5

==== Section 2 ====
First round
(United States) M Cahill (United States) To Gullikson	3	7	6
4	(United States) M Riessen (United States) S Stewart	6	6	3
(Chile) J Fillol (Chile) A Fillol	6	3	6
(Colombia) A Cortes (Finland) L Palin	3	6	3
(United States) A Andrews (United States) D Gitlin	7	6	6
(Australia) M Edmondson (Australia) C Letcher	5	7	2
(United States) R Baxter (United States) J Ross	6	6
12	(South Africa) J Kriek (South Africa) F McMillan	2	4
(United States) T Graham (United States) B Nichols	7	6	6
16	(South Africa) E Edwards (United States) C Edwards	6	7	3
(Australia) J James (United States) R Meyer	6	7
(United States) J Gurfein (United States) B Willenborg	4	6
(Australia) S Docherty (Canada) H Fritz	6	5	6
(United States) G Fritz (Zimbabwe) H Ismail	4	7	3
(Australia) J Newcombe (Australia) F Stolle	6	7
5	(United States) B Manson (United States) B Teacher	3	5

Second round
(United States) M Cahill (United States) To Gullikson	6	6	6
(Chile) J Fillol (Chile) A Fillol	2	7	2
(United States) A Andrews (United States) D Gitlin	6	7
(United States) R Baxter (United States) J Ross	3	6
(United States) T Graham (United States) B Nichols	6	6	6
(Australia) J James (United States) R Meyer	7	1	4
(Australia) S Docherty (Canada) H Fritz	7	6	2
(Australia) J Newcombe (Australia) F Stolle	6	7	6

Third round
(United States) M Cahill (United States) To Gullikson	6	3	6	6	7
(United States) A Andrews (United States) D Gitlin	7	6	3	4	5
(United States) T Graham (United States) B Nichols	6	3	6	6	4
(Australia) J Newcombe (Australia) F Stolle	3	6	7	4	6

Quarterfinals
(United States) M Cahill (United States) To Gullikson	5	6	6	6	3
(Australia) J Newcombe (Australia) F Stolle	7	7	3	4	6

=== Bottom half ===
==== Section 3 ====
First round
6	(United States) F Buehning (United States) F Taygan	6	6
(Chile) R Acuña (Chile) P Rebolledo	1	1
(United States) D Pate (United States) K Richter	7	7
(India) A Amritraj (India) V Amritraj	6	6
(United States) S McCain (United States) L Stefanki	7	6
(Australia) C Dibley (United Kingdom) J Smith	6	1
15	(South Africa) R Moore (United States) E van Dillen	3	6	6
(United States) R Fagel (Israel) D Schneider	6	4	1
(United States) L Bourne (United States) M Mitchell	7	6
13	(United States) A Pattison (United States) B Walts	6	3
(Australia) B Drewett (New Zealand) C Lewis	6	7
(Peru) F Maynetto (Chile) J Núñez	4	6
(United States) M Bauer (United States) J Benson	4	6	6
(United States) S Meister (United States) M Vines	6	3	3
3	(Mexico) R Ramírez (United States) V Winitsky	7	7
(United States) D Dowlen (Nigeria) N Odizor	6	5

Second round
6	(United States) F Buehning (United States) F Taygan	7	6
(United States) D Pate (United States) K Richter	5	4
(United States) S McCain (United States) L Stefanki	6	1
15	(South Africa) R Moore (United States) E van Dillen	7	6
(United States) L Bourne (United States) M Mitchell	7	6
(Australia) B Drewett (New Zealand) C Lewis	5	4
(United States) M Bauer (United States) J Benson	3	6	6
3	(Mexico) R Ramírez (United States) V Winitsky	6	2	3

Third round
6	(United States) F Buehning (United States) F Taygan	6	6	6
15	(South Africa) R Moore (United States) E van Dillen	4	2	2
(United States) L Bourne (United States) M Mitchell	6	2	6	6	7
(United States) M Bauer (United States) J Benson	7	6	4	1	5

Quarterfinals
6	(United States) F Buehning (United States) F Taygan	3	6	6	6	6
(United States) L Bourne (United States) M Mitchell	6	3	7	4	3

==== Section 4 ====
First round
8	(United States) V Amaya (United States) H Pfister	6	3	6
(Sweden) P Hjertquist (United States) S Krulevitz	2	6	2
(United States) T Delatte (United States) T Waltke	1	6	7
(Ecuador) A Gómez (United States) T Wilkison	6	4	6
(Netherlands) T Okker (United States) D Stockton	6	6
(Philippines) B Sison (United States) C Wittus	4	2
11	(United States) Ti Gullikson (South Africa) B Mitton	7	7
(United States) J Bailey (United States) C Hooper	6	5
(United States) M Fishbach (United States) M Hardy	7	6	6
9	(Poland) W Fibak (United States) S Smith	5	7	4
(United States) T Mayotte (United States) C Mayotte	7	6
(Switzerland) M Günthardt (Sweden) H Simonsson	6	4
(United States) E Fromm (United States) C Leeds	6	6
(Australia) J Alexander (Australia) P Dent	4	3
2	(Switzerland) H Günthardt (Australia) P McNamara	6	6
(France) H Leconte (France) G Moretton	3	4

Second round
8	(United States) V Amaya (United States) H Pfister	7	7
(United States) T Delatte (United States) T Waltke	5	6
(Netherlands) T Okker (United States) D Stockton	6	6
11	(United States) Ti Gullikson (South Africa) B Mitton	3	2
(United States) M Fishbach (United States) M Hardy	4	4
(United States) T Mayotte (United States) C Mayotte	6	6
(United States) E Fromm (United States) C Leeds	7	1	6
2	(Switzerland) H Günthardt (Australia) P McNamara	6	6	7

Third round
8	(United States) V Amaya (United States) H Pfister	6	4	1	6	7
(Netherlands) T Okker (United States) D Stockton	3	6	6	3	5
(United States) T Mayotte (United States) C Mayotte	4	3	0
2	(Switzerland) H Günthardt (Australia) P McNamara	6	6	6

Quarterfinals
8	(United States) V Amaya (United States) H Pfister	4	2	4
2	(Switzerland) H Günthardt (Australia) P McNamara	6	6	6
