= Virginia Slims of Detroit =

Women's tennis tournament

Defunct tennis tournament
- Event name: K-Mart International (1972); Virginia Slims of Detroit (1973–78, 1983); Avon Championships of Detroit (1979–82)
- Tour: WTA Tour
- Founded: 1971
- Abolished: 1983
- Editions: 13
- Location: Birmingham, Michigan (1972); Detroit, Michigan (1973–83)
- Venue: Cobo Hall & Arena (1973–82)
- Surface: Carpet / indoor

The Virginia Slims of Detroit is a defunct WTA Tour affiliated tennis tournament played from 1971 to 1983. It was held in Birmingham, Michigan in the United States in 1972 and in Detroit, Michigan in the United States from 1973 to 1983. The tournament was played on indoor carpet courts.

Billie Jean King was the most successful player at the tournament, winning the singles competition three times and the doubles competition four times, partnering American Rosemary Casals twice and Czechoslovak Martina Navratilova and South African Ilana Kloss once each for her doubles successes.

== Past finals ==
=== Singles ===
Year	Champions	Runners-up	Score
1971	(United States) Billie Jean King	(United States) Rosemary Casals	3–6, 6–1, 6–2
1972	(Australia) Kerry Melville	(United States) Rosemary Casals	6–3, 6–7^{(3–5)}, 6–4
1973	(Australia) Margaret Court	(Australia) Kerry Melville	7–6^{(5–4)}, 6–3
1974	(United States) Billie Jean King	(United States) Rosemary Casals	6–1, 6–1
1975	(Australia) Evonne Goolagong	(Australia) Margaret Court	6–3, 3–6, 6–3
1976	(United States) Chris Evert	(United States) Rosemary Casals	6–4, 6–2
1977	(Czechoslovakia) Martina Navratilova	(United Kingdom) Sue Barker	6–4, 6–4
1978	(Czechoslovakia) Martina Navratilova	(Australia) Dianne Fromholtz	6–3, 6–2
1979	(Australia) Wendy Turnbull	(Romania) Virginia Ruzici	7–5, 1–6, 7–6
1980	(United States) Billie Jean King	(Australia) Evonne Goolagong Cawley	6–3, 6–0
1981	(United States) Leslie Allen	(Czechoslovakia) Hana Mandlíková	6–4, 6–4
1982	(United States) Andrea Jaeger	(Socialist Federal Republic of Yugoslavia) Mima Jaušovec	2–6, 6–4, 6–2
1983	(Romania) Virginia Ruzici	(United States) Kathy Jordan	4–6, 6–4, 6–2

=== Doubles ===
Year	Champions	Runners-up	Score
1972	(France) Françoise Dürr (Australia) Judy Tegart	(United States) Rosemary Casals (Australia) Kerry Melville	6–1, 6–1
1973	(United States) Rosemary Casals (United States) Billie Jean King	(Australia) Karen Krantzcke (Netherlands) Betty Stöve	6–3, 3–6, 6–1
1974	(United States) Rosemary Casals (United States) Billie Jean King	(France) Françoise Dürr (Netherlands) Betty Stöve	2–6, 6–4, 7–5
1975	(Australia) Lesley Hunt (Czechoslovakia) Martina Navratilova	(France) Françoise Dürr (Netherlands) Betty Stöve	2–6, 7–5, 6–2
1976	(United States) Mona Guerrant (United States) Ann Kiyomura	(United States) Chris Evert (Netherlands) Betty Stöve	6–3, 6–4
1977	(Czechoslovakia) Martina Navratilova (Netherlands) Betty Stöve	(United States) Janet Newberry (United States) JoAnne Russell	6–3, 6–4
1978	(United States) Billie Jean King (Czechoslovakia) Martina Navratilova	(Australia) Kerry Reid (Australia) Wendy Turnbull	6–3, 6–4
1979	(Netherlands) Betty Stöve (Australia) Wendy Turnbull	(United Kingdom) Sue Barker (United States) Ann Kiyomura	6–4, 7–6
1980	(United States) Billie Jean King (South Africa) Ilana Kloss	(United States) Kathy Jordan (United States) Anne Smith	3–6, 6–3, 6–2
1981	(United States) Rosemary Casals (Australia) Wendy Turnbull	(Czechoslovakia) Hana Mandlíková (Netherlands) Betty Stöve	6–4, 6–2
1982	(United States) Leslie Allen (Socialist Federal Republic of Yugoslavia) Mima Jaušovec	(United States) Rosemary Casals (Australia) Wendy Turnbull	6–4, 6–0
1983	(United States) Kathy Jordan (United States) Barbara Potter	(United States) Rosemary Casals (Australia) Wendy Turnbull	6–4, 6–1

== See also ==
- 1983 Virginia Slims of Detroit
