= 1981 US Open – Men's singles =

Men's singles
- 1981 US Open

Final
- Champion: (United States) John McEnroe
- Runner-up: (Sweden) Björn Borg
- Score: 4–6, 6–2, 6–4, 6–3

Details
- Draw: 128
- Seeds: 16

Events
Singles	men	women		boys	girls
Doubles	men	women	mixed	boys	girls
WC Singles	men	women	quad
WC Doubles	men	women	quad
Legends	men	women	mixed
- US Open

Two-time defending champion John McEnroe defeated Björn Borg in a rematch of the previous year's final, 4–6, 6–2, 6–4, 6–3 to win the men's singles tennis title at the 1981 US Open. It was his third US Open singles title and fourth major singles title overall. It was Borg's fourth runner-up finish at the US Open, his career-best finish at the event. The final would mark the 14th and final meeting between the pair (with McEnroe's victory leveling the rivalry at 7–7) as well as the last major appearance of eleven-time major champion Borg, due to his later retirement from the sport. He left the venue immediately after the final point, before the trophy ceremony.

== Seeds ==
The seeded players are listed below. John McEnroe is the champion; others show the round in which they were eliminated.

1. (United States) John McEnroe (champion)
2. (Sweden) Björn Borg (finalist)
3. (Czechoslovakia) Ivan Lendl (fourth round)
4. (United States) Jimmy Connors (semifinalist)
5. (Argentina) José Luis Clerc (fourth round)
6. (Argentina) Guillermo Vilas (fourth round)
7. (United States) Gene Mayer (fourth round)
8. (United States) Eliot Teltscher (quarterfinalist)
9. (United States) Roscoe Tanner (quarterfinalist)
10. (United States) Brian Teacher (second round)
11. (Australia) Peter McNamara (third round)
12. (South Africa) Johan Kriek (third round)
13. (France) Yannick Noah (fourth round)
14. (Poland) Wojtek Fibak (first round)
15. (United States) Vitas Gerulaitis (semifinalist)
16. (United States) Brian Gottfried (fourth round)

== Draw ==
=== Key ===
- Q = Qualifier
- WC = Wild card
- LL = Lucky loser
- r = Retired

=== Final eight ===
Quarterfinals
1	(United States) John McEnroe	6^{10}	7^{7}	6	6
(India) Ramesh Krishnan	7^{12}	6^{4}	4	2
15	(United States) Vitas Gerulaitis	6	6	4	6
(United States) Bruce Manson	4	2	6	1
8	(United States) Eliot Teltscher	3	1	2
4	(United States) Jimmy Connors	6	6	6
9	(United States) Roscoe Tanner	6^{4}	3	7^{7}	6^{7}
2	(Sweden) Björn Borg	7^{7}	6	6^{4}	7^{9}

Semifinals
1	(United States) John McEnroe	5	6	6	4	6
15	(United States) Vitas Gerulaitis	7	3	2	6	3
4	(United States) Jimmy Connors	2	5	4
2	(Sweden) Björn Borg	6	7	6

Final
1	(United States) John McEnroe	4	6	6	6
2	(Sweden) Björn Borg	6	2	4	3

=== Section 1 ===
First round
1	(United States) McEnroe	6	6	6	6
(Chile) Núñez	7	1	3	2
(France) Bedel	1	4	4
(United States) Gullikson	6	6	6
(United States) DuPré	6	6	4	6
(United States) Delaney	3	3	6	2
(United States) Gullikson	6	6	3	6	1
(United States) Hooper	7	2	6	3	6
(Switzerland) Dupasquier	3	2	1
(Australia) Edmondson	6	6	6
(United States) Kohlberg	5	4	4
(France) Roger-Vasselin	7	6	6
(Bolivia) Martinez	6	6	4	4	2
(United States) Lapidus	4	4	6	6	6
(South Africa) Curren	7	6	7
14	(Poland) Fibak	6	4	6

Second round
1	(United States) McEnroe	6	6	6
(United States) Gullikson	3	1	3
(United States) DuPré	6	6	6
(United States) Hooper	4	2	4
(Australia) Edmondson	4	3	6	6
(France) Roger-Vasselin	6	6	1	4^{r}
(United States) Lapidus	6	3	7	1	3
(South Africa) Curren	4	6	6	6	6

Third round
1	(United States) McEnroe	6	6	6
(United States) DuPré	3	2	3
(Australia) Edmondson	3	5	2
(South Africa) Curren	6	7	6

Fourth round
1	(United States) McEnroe	7	6	6
(South Africa) Curren	5	0	1

=== Section 2 ===
First round
10	(United States) Teacher	6	6	7
(United States) Scanlon	3	2	5
(United States) Davis	6	7	3	6
(United States) Bourne	3	5	6	1
(United States) Sadri	7	7	5	4	6
(United States) Smith	5	6	7	6	7
(India) Krishnan	6	6	6
(Sweden) Hjertquist	1	1	3
(Paraguay) González	3	2	6	5
(United States) Krulevitz	6	6	2	7
(France) Tulasne	6	3	4	4
(United States) Stockton	4	6	6	6
(United States) Wittus	5	6	6	1	3
(United States) Buehning	7	3	4	6	6
(United States) Hayes	4	2	2
7	(United States) Mayer	6	6	6

Second round
10	(United States) Teacher	6	6	2	4
(United States) Davis	2	7	6	6
(United States) Smith	4	3	3
(India) Krishnan	6	6	6
(United States) Krulevitz	4	4	2
(United States) Stockton	6	6	6
(United States) Buehning	4	2	3
7	(United States) Mayer	6	6	6

Third round
(United States) Davis	2	6	7	4
(India) Krishnan	6	7	6	6
(United States) Stockton	4	4	1
7	(United States) Mayer	6	6	6

Fourth round
(India) Krishnan	4	6	7	7
7	(United States) Mayer	6	1	6	5

=== Section 3 ===
First round
3	(Czechoslovakia) Lendl	6	6	6
(Sweden) Simonsson	2	2	2
(France) Portes	2	3	1
(United States) Borowiak	6	6	6
(South Africa) Edwards	6	7	6	6
(United States) Fromm	3	6	7	4
(United States) Vines	6	2	6	4
(New Zealand) Simpson	3	6	2	3	r
(Australia) Ball	1	6	2
(United States) Arias	6	7	6
(South Africa) Tarr	0	1	7	1
(United States) Solomon	6	6	6	6
(United States) Brown	3	6	6	6	5
(Colombia) Cortes	6	4	4	7	7
(United States) Moor	6	3	0	6	2
15	(United States) Gerulaitis	4	6	6	3	6

Second round
3	(Czechoslovakia) Lendl	7	6	7
(United States) Borowiak	6	1	6
(South Africa) Edwards	1	7	1	4
(United States) Vines	6	5	6	6
(United States) Arias	6	6	3	r
(United States) Solomon	7	7	3
(Colombia) Cortes	6	0	1
15	(United States) Gerulaitis	7	6	6

Third round
3	(Czechoslovakia) Lendl	6	3	6	6
(United States) Vines	4	6	2	3
(United States) Solomon	3	2	3
15	(United States) Gerulaitis	6	6	6

Fourth round
3	(Czechoslovakia) Lendl	3	4	6	6	4
15	(United States) Gerulaitis	6	6	3	3	6

=== Section 4 ===
First round
11	(Australia) McNamara	7	2	6	6
(Australia) Fitzgerald	6	6	3	3
(United States) Fishbach	2	4	2
(United States) Fleming	6	6	6
(United States) Meyer	6	6	7
(South Africa) Mitton	3	4	6
(United States) Manson	6	6	6
(United States) Saltz	0	0	2
(Romania) Năstase	6	3	4	6	3
(United States) Purcell	3	6	6	3	6
(United Kingdom) Smith	4	4	2
(Israel) Glickstein	6	6	6
(Australia) Alexander	4	6	6	4
(United States) Wilkison	6	2	7	6
(Australia) Drewett	4	3	3
5	(Argentina) Clerc	6	6	6

Second round
11	(Australia) McNamara	6	6	5	6
(United States) Fleming	4	2	7	3
(United States) Meyer	0	2	6	6	2
(United States) Manson	6	6	3	4	6
(United States) Purcell	6	6	7
(Israel) Glickstein	4	4	5
(United States) Wilkison	4	7	4	7	6
5	(Argentina) Clerc	6	5	6	5	7

Third round
11	(Australia) McNamara	6	3	4	2
(United States) Manson	4	6	6	6
(United States) Purcell	3	6	6	4	3
5	(Argentina) Clerc	6	0	0	6	6

Fourth round
(United States) Manson	6	7	6
5	(Argentina) Clerc	3	6	3

=== Section 5 ===
First round
8	(United States) Teltscher	6	6	6
(United States) Amaya	2	2	4
(United States) Saviano	2	7	1	4
(United States) Austin	6	6	6	6
(France) Moretton	6	3	4	7	6
(Puerto Rico) Fernandez	3	6	6	6	3
(India) Amritraj	6	6	6
(United States) Davis	3	4	2
(Canada) Cowan	5	4	2
(United States) McCain	7	6	6
(United States) Mayotte	6	6	6	6
(United States) Denton	3	4	7	3
(United States) Walts	7	6	6	2	6
(United States) Fagel	6	4	7	6	1
(United States) Van Patten	4	4	1
16	(United States) Gottfried	6	6	6

Second round
8	(United States) Teltscher	6	6	6
(United States) Austin	2	2	2
(France) Moretton	5	3	4
(India) Amritraj	7	6	6
(United States) McCain	3	6	6	1	2
(United States) Mayotte	6	3	4	6	6
(United States) Walts	6	4	2
16	(United States) Gottfried	7	6	6

Third round
8	(United States) Teltscher	6	6	6
(India) Amritraj	2	4	0
(United States) Mayotte	2	3	7	6
16	(United States) Gottfried	6	6	6	7

Fourth round
8	(United States) Teltscher	6	6	5	1	6
16	(United States) Gottfried	4	0	7	6	3

=== Section 6 ===
First round
12	(South Africa) Kriek	6	6	7
(United States) De Palmer	2	3	5
(United States) Gurfein	2	2	7	2
(United States) Doyle	6	6	5	6
(United States) Freeman	6	5	6
(Zimbabwe) Pattison	7	7	7
(United States) Cahill	6	6	6
(United States) Meister	3	3	4
(United States) Winitsky	6	3	2
(Ecuador) Gómez	7	6	6
(New Zealand) Lewis	7	7	6
(United States) Pfister	5	6	2
(Chile) Rebolledo	1	2	2
(Socialist Federal Republic of Yugoslavia) Ostoja	6	6	6
(United Kingdom) Lloyd	0	0	2
4	(United States) Connors	6	6	6

Second round
12	(South Africa) Kriek	4	6	6	6
(United States) Doyle	6	4	3	0
(Zimbabwe) Pattison	4	1	6
(United States) Cahill	6	6	7
(Ecuador) Gómez	6	6	6
(New Zealand) Lewis	4	3	3
(Socialist Federal Republic of Yugoslavia) Ostoja	6	4	3
4	(United States) Connors	7	6	6

Third round
12	(South Africa) Kriek	6	2	1	4
(United States) Cahill	4	6	6	6
(Ecuador) Gómez	7^{7}	3	1	6	6^{5}
4	(United States) Connors	6^{4}	6	6	4	7^{7}

Fourth round
(United States) Cahill	3	3	1
4	(United States) Connors	6	6	6

=== Section 7 ===
First round
6	(Argentina) Vilas	6	6	6	6
(United States) Gitlin	3	7	0	4
(Mexico) Ramírez	6	6	6
(Zimbabwe) Ismail	3	2	4
(Switzerland) Stadler	6	7	5	6
(Australia) Docherty	4	5	7	2
(Italy) Panatta	7	4	6	6
(United States) Taygan	6	6	3	2
(United States) Nichols	4	4	7	4
(Australia) James	6	6	5	6
(Canada) Segal	1	4	4
(United States) Mayotte	6	6	6
(Australia) Case	2	6	2
(United States) Delaney	6	7	6
(United States) Edwards	3	3	4
9	(United States) Tanner	6	6	6

Second round
6	(Argentina) Vilas	6	6	6
(Mexico) Ramírez	1	3	2
(Switzerland) Stadler	5	3	1
(Italy) Panatta	7	6	6
(Australia) James	4	7	5	6	0
(United States) Mayotte	6	5	7	4	6
(United States) Delaney	6	1	4	1
9	(United States) Tanner	4	6	6	6

Third round
6	(Argentina) Vilas	7	4	7	6
(Italy) Panatta	6	6	5	4
(United States) Mayotte	6	1	2
9	(United States) Tanner	7	6	6

Fourth round
6	(Argentina) Vilas	4	2	6^{13}
9	(United States) Tanner	6	6	7^{15}

=== Section 8 ===
First round
13	(France) Noah	6	6	5	4	6
(United States) Andrews	3	4	7	6	2
(United States) Benson	6	0	6	1	4
(United States) Van Dillen	4	6	4	6	6
(United States) Waltke	7	6	1	4	7
(United States) Stewart	6	4	6	6	5
(United States) Giammalva	2	6	1	5
(France) Fritz	6	2	6	7
(Australia) Carter	7	2	7	6
(Chile) Fillol Sr.	6	6	6	2
(United States) Giammalva Jr.	6	4	6	1	6
(Switzerland) Günthardt	4	6	3	6	1
(Australia) Dent	7	5	4	6	3
(United States) Stefanki	6	7	6	3	6
(Switzerland) Günthardt	2	2	0
2	(Sweden) Borg	6	6	6

Second round
13	(France) Noah	6	6	4	7
(United States) Van Dillen	4	2	6	5
(United States) Waltke	6	6	7
(France) Fritz	3	3	6
(Australia) Carter	4	6	1	6	6
(United States) Giammalva Jr.	6	2	6	4	0
(United States) Stefanki	4	4	4
2	(Sweden) Borg	6	6	6

Third round
13	(France) Noah	6	6	6
(United States) Waltke	3	4	4
(Australia) Carter	2	2	2
2	(Sweden) Borg	6	6	6

Fourth round
13	(France) Noah	7^{7}	4	3	3
2	(Sweden) Borg	6^{2}	6	6	6

Preceded by 1981 Wimbledon Championships – Men's singles	Grand Slam men's singles	Succeeded by 1981 Australian Open – Men's singles
