= Leigh-Anne Thompson =

American tennis player

- Country (sports): United States
- Born: January 8, 1964 (age 61) Newport News, Virginia, U.S.
- Turned pro: February 1982
- Retired: July 1988
- Plays: Right-handed (two-handed backhand)
- Prize money: US$ 123,019

Singles
- Career record: 42–68
- Career titles: 1
- Highest ranking: No. 27 (August 15, 1983)

Grand Slam singles results
- French Open: 2R (1982)
- Wimbledon: 1R (1982)
- US Open: 3R (1981, 1985)

Doubles
- Career record: 3–19
- Career titles: 0

Grand Slam doubles results
- French Open: 2R (1982)
- US Open: 2R (1982)

Leigh-Anne Thompson (born January 8, 1964) is a retired American professional tennis player.

== Career ==
Thompson turned professional in February 1982. She had career wins over Andrea Jaeger, Helena Suková, Bettina Bunge, and Catarina Lindqvist. She won 1 singles title and reached a career-high ranking of World No. 27 in 1983. She retired in 1988.

== WTA Tour finals ==
=== Singles: 3 (1–2) ===
Winner — Legend Grand Slam tournaments (0–0) WTA Tour Championships (0–0) Virginia Slims, Avon, Other (1–2)	Titles by surface Hard (1–1) Grass (0–0) Clay (0–0) Carpet (0–1)

Result	W-L	Date	Tournament	Surface	Opponent	Score
Loss	0–1	Jan 1982	Montreal, Canada	Hard (i)	(United Kingdom) Glynis Coles	6–4, 6–4
Loss	0–2	Feb 1982	Nashville, US	Carpet (i)	(West Germany) Eva Pfaff	6–3, 7–5
Win	1–2	Aug 1982	Mahwah, US	Hard	(West Germany) Bettina Bunge	7–6^{(7–4)}, 6–3

== Grand Slam singles tournament timeline ==
Key
W	F	SF	QF	#R	RR	Q#	DNQ	A	NH

(W) winner; (F) finalist; (SF) semifinalist; (QF) quarterfinalist; (#R) rounds 4, 3, 2, 1; (RR) round-robin stage; (Q#) qualification round; (DNQ) did not qualify; (A) absent; (NH) not held; (SR) strike rate (events won / competed); (W–L) win–loss record.

Tournament	1981	1982	1983	1984	1985	1986	1987	1988	Career SR
Australian Open	A	A	A	A	A	NH	A	A	0 / 0
French Open	A	2R	1R	A	A	A	A	A	0 / 2
Wimbledon	A	1R	A	A	A	A	A	A	0 / 1
US Open	3R	2R	1R	1R	3R	1R	A	A	0 / 6
SR	0 / 1	0 / 3	0 / 2	0 / 1	0 / 1	0 / 1	0 / 0	0 / 0	0 / 9
Year-end ranking	63	31	56	215	94	111	NR	NR	
