= 1981 US Open – Mixed doubles =

Mixed doubles
- 1981 US Open

Final
- Champions: (United States) Anne Smith (South Africa) Kevin Curren
- Runners-up: (United States) JoAnne Russell (United States) Steve Denton
- Score: 6–4, 7–6^{(7–4)}

Details
- Draw: 32
- Seeds: 8

Events
Singles	men	women		boys	girls
Doubles	men	women	mixed	boys	girls
WC Singles	men	women	quad
WC Doubles	men	women	quad
Legends	men	women	mixed
- US Open

Wendy Turnbull and Marty Riessen were the defending champions but lost in the first round to Wendy White and Mike Bauer.

Anne Smith and Kevin Curren won in the final 6–4, 7–6^{(7–4)} against JoAnne Russell and Steve Denton.

== Seeds ==
Champion seeds are indicated in bold text while text in italics indicates the round in which those seeds were eliminated.

1. (Netherlands) Betty Stöve / (South Africa) Frew McMillan (second round)
2. (Australia) Wendy Turnbull / (United States) Marty Riessen (first round)
3. (United States) **Anne Smith** / (South Africa) **Kevin Curren (champions)**
4. (United States) JoAnne Russell / (United States) Steve Denton (final)
5. (Romania) Virginia Ruzici / (Romania) Ilie Năstase (quarterfinals)
6. (United States) Pam Teeguarden / (Switzerland) Heinz Günthardt (quarterfinals)
7. (United States) Mary Lou Piatek / (Australia) Ross Case (quarterfinals)
8. (West Germany) Bettina Bunge / (United States) Dick Stockton (semifinals)

== Draw ==
Key

- Q = Qualifier
- WC = Wild card
- LL = Lucky loser
- Alt = Alternate
- ITF = ITF entry
- PR = Protected ranking
- SR = Special ranking
- SE = Special exempt
- JE = Junior exempt
- JR = Junior Accelerator Programme entrant
- CO = College Accelerator Programme entrant
- NG = Next Gen Accelerator Program entrant
- w/o = Walkover
- r = Retired
- d = Defaulted

=== Final ===
Final
4	(United States) JoAnne Russell (United States) Steve Denton	4	6^{4}
3	(United States) **Anne Smith** (South Africa) **Kevin Curren**	**6**	**7^{7}**

=== Top half ===
First round
1	(Netherlands) **B Stöve** (South Africa) **F McMillan**	**6**	3	**7**
(United States) S Mascarin (United States) S Davis	2	**6**	5
(United States) **P Smith** (United States) **M Purcell**	**7**	3	**6**
(United States) B Nagelsen (United States) R Meyer	6	**6**	3
(United States) **K Rinaldi** (United States) **V Van Patten**	3	**7**	**7**
(United States) D Desfor (United States) G Hardie	**6**	6	6
(United States) N Yeargin (United States) J Benson	3	5
7	(United States) **M L Piatek** (Australia) **R Case**	**6**	**7**
4	(United States) **J Russell** (United States) **S Denton**	**6**	**7**
(Australia) D Fromholtz (Australia) M Edmondson	1	6
(United States) **M Kremer** (United States) **T Buford**	**6**	**6**
(West Germany) E Pfaff (United States) R Fagel	4	3
(South Africa) **I Kloss** (Chile) **J Fillol**	w/o
(United States) S Walsh (United States) D Ralston
(United States) D Morrison (United States) M Mitchell	4	**6**	1
6	(United States) **P Teeguarden** (Switzerland) **H Günthardt**	**6**	2	**6**

Second round
1	(Netherlands) B Stöve (South Africa) F McMillan	1	3
(United States) **P Smith** (United States) **M Purcell**	**6**	**6**
(United States) K Rinaldi (United States) V Van Patten	4	6
7	(United States) **M L Piatek** (Australia) **R Case**	**6**	**7**
4	(United States) **J Russell** (United States) **S Denton**	**6**	**6**
(United States) M Kremer (United States) T Buford	1	4
(South Africa) I Kloss (Switzerland) H Günthardt	6	5
6	(United States) **P Teeguarden** (Switzerland) **H Günthardt**	**7**	**7**

Quarterfinals
(United States) **P Smith** (United States) **M Purcell**	**6**	3	**6**
7	(United States) M L Piatek (Australia) R Case	3	**6**	4
4	(United States) **J Russell** (United States) **S Denton**	**6**	**6**
6	(United States) P Teeguarden (Switzerland) H Günthardt	4	4

Semifinals
(United States) P Smith (United States) M Purcell	6	4
4	(United States) **J Russell** (United States) **S Denton**	**7**	**6**

=== Bottom half ===
First round
5	(Romania) **V Ruzici** (Romania) **I Năstase**	**6**	**6**
(United States) L Forood (United States) K Kerns	3	4
(United States) **A Kiyomura** (United States) **M Estep**	**6**	**6**
(New Zealand) C Newton (Republic of Ireland) M Doyle	4	1
(South Africa) **R Fairbank** (South Africa) **P Cramer**	3	**6**	**6**
(United States) S Acker (United States) C Leeds	**6**	3	1
(United States) B Jordan (United States) J Delaney	6	4
3	(United States) **A Smith** (South Africa) **K Curren**	**7**	**6**
8	(West Germany) **B Bunge** (United States) **D Stockton**	**7**	**6**
ALT	(United States) S Margolin (United States) M Margolin	5	0
(United States) **L Allen** (United States) **G Fritz**	**7**	5	**7**
(United Kingdom) A Hobbs (United States) E Fromm	5	**7**	6
(Australia) **P Whytcross** (Australia) **C Letcher**	**7**	4	**6**
(Romania) L Romanov (United States) S Krulevitz	5	**6**	4
(United States) **W White** (United States) **M Bauer**	4	**6**	**7**
2	(Australia) W Turnbull (United States) M Riessen	**6**	3	6

Second round
5	(Romania) **V Ruzici** (Romania) **I Năstase**	**6**	3	**6**
(United States) A Kiyomura (United States) M Estep	4	**6**	4
(South Africa) R Fairbank (South Africa) P Cramer	2	3
3	(United States) **A Smith** (South Africa) **K Curren**	**6**	**6**
8	(West Germany) **B Bunge** (United States) **D Stockton**	**6**	**6**
(United States) L Allen (United States) G Fritz	3	2
(Australia) P Whytcross (Australia) C Letcher	3	4
(United States) **W White** (United States) **M Bauer**	**6**	**6**

Quarterfinals
5	(Romania) V Ruzici (Romania) I Năstase	**7**	2	6
3	(United States) **A Smith** (South Africa) **K Curren**	5	**6**	**7**
8	(West Germany) **B Bunge** (United States) **D Stockton**	**6**	**6**
(United States) W White (United States) M Bauer	4	4

Semifinals
3	(United States) **A Smith** (South Africa) **K Curren**	**6**	**6**
8	(West Germany) B Bunge (United States) D Stockton	4	4
