= Kate Gompert =

American tennis player

- Country (sports): United States
- Born: January 11, 1963 (age 63) Ames, Iowa, U.S.
- Height: 5 ft 10 in (1.78 m)
- Plays: Left-handed (two-handed backhand)
- Prize money: $187,076

Singles
- Career record: 77–78
- Career titles: 0
- Highest ranking: No. 18 (July 6, 1987)

Grand Slam singles results
- French Open: 3R (1987)
- Wimbledon: 1R (1985, 1986, 1987)
- US Open: 4R (1985)

Doubles
- Career record: 3–8
- Career titles: 0
- Highest ranking: No. 214 (December 4, 1989)

Kate Gompert (born January 11, 1963) is a former professional tennis player from the United States.

Gompert had a career record of 77–78. She had a career high singles ranking of world no. 18 in July 1987. Her biggest career win occurred in 1987 at the Virginia Slims of Florida when she defeated the defending champion and first-seeded Chris Evert in three sets. Her best singles result at a Grand Slam tournament was reaching the fourth round of the 1985 US Open where she lost to sixth-seeded Zina Garrison. She did not compete in 1988 due to mononucleosis.

Author and tennis enthusiast David Foster Wallace used Gompert's name for an otherwise unrelated character in his novel Infinite Jest.

== WTA Tour finals ==
=== Singles: 1 (0–1) ===
Winner — Legend Grand Slam tournaments (0–0) WTA Tour Championships (0–0) Virginia Slims (0–1)	Finals by surface Hard (0–0) Grass (0–0) Clay (0–1) Carpet (0–0)

Result	W/L	Date	Tournament	Surface	Opponent	Score
Loss	0–1	Apr 1987	Tampa, U.S.	Clay	(United States) Chris Evert	3–6, 2–6
