= 1981 US Open (tennis) =

- Date: September 1–13
- Edition: 101st
- Category: Grand Slam (ITF)
- Surface: Hardcourt
- Location: New York City, New York

Champions

Men's singles
- (United States) John McEnroe

Women's singles
- (United States) Tracy Austin

Men's doubles
- (United States) Peter Fleming / (United States) John McEnroe

Women's doubles
- (United States) Kathy Jordan / (United States) Anne Smith

Mixed doubles
- (United States) Anne Smith / (South Africa) Kevin Curren

Boys' singles
- (Sweden) Thomas Högstedt

Girls' singles
- (United States) Zina Garrison
- US Open

The 1981 US Open was a tennis tournament played on outdoor hard courts at the USTA National Tennis Center in New York City, New York. It was the 101st edition of the US Open and was held from September 1 to September 13, 1981. It marked the centenary of the inaugural tournament.

== Seniors ==
=== Men's singles ===
(United States) John McEnroe defeated (Sweden) Björn Borg 4–6, 6–2, 6–4, 6–3

- It was McEnroe's 4th career Grand Slam title and his 3rd US Open title.

=== Women's singles ===
(United States) Tracy Austin defeated (United States) Martina Navratilova 1–6, 7–6^{(7–4)}, 7–6^{(7–1)}

- It was Austin's 2nd and last career Grand Slam title and her 2nd US Open title.

=== Men's doubles ===
(United States) Peter Fleming / (United States) John McEnroe defeated (Switzerland) Heinz Günthardt / (Australia) Peter McNamara by walkover

- It was Fleming's 4th career Grand Slam title and his 2nd US Open title. It was McEnroe's 9th career Grand Slam title and his 4th US Open title.

=== Women's doubles ===
(United States) Kathy Jordan / (United States) Anne Smith defeated (United States) Rosemary Casals / (Australia) Wendy Turnbull 6–3, 6–3

- It was Jordan's 3rd career Grand Slam title and her only US Open title. It was Smith's 4th career Grand Slam title and her 1st US Open title.

=== Mixed doubles ===
(United States) Anne Smith / (South Africa) Kevin Curren defeated (United States) JoAnne Russell / (United States) Steve Denton 6–4, 7–6^{(7–4)}

- It was Smith's 5th career Grand Slam title and her 2nd US Open title. It was Curren's 1st career Grand Slam title and his 1st US Open title.

== Juniors ==
=== Boys' singles ===
(Sweden) Thomas Högstedt defeated (West Germany) Hans Schwaier 7–5, 6–3

=== Girls' singles ===
(United States) Zina Garrison defeated (United States) Kate Gompert 6–0, 6–3

Preceded by 1981 Wimbledon Championships	Grand Slams	Succeeded by 1981 Australian Open
