= WTA New Jersey =

Defunct tennis tournament
- Event name: Bergen County Classic (1978); Volvo Cup (1979–82); Virginia Slims of New Jersey (1983); United Jersey Bank Classic (1984–89)
- Tour: WTA Tour
- Founded: 1978
- Abolished: 1989
- Editions: 12
- Location: Mahwah, New Jersey, USA
- Surface: Hard

The WTA New Jersey is a defunct WTA Tour affiliated tennis tournament played from 1978 to 1989. It was held in Mahwah, New Jersey in the United States and played on outdoor hard courts.

Steffi Graf was the most successful player at the tournament, winning the singles competition three times and the doubles competition in 1989 partnering American Pam Shriver.

== Past finals ==
=== Singles ===
Year	Champions	Runners-up	Score
1978	(United Kingdom) Virginia Wade	(Australia) Kerry Reid	1–6, 6–1, 6–4
1979	(United States) Chris Evert	(United States) Tracy Austin	6–7^{(2–7)}, 6–4, 6–1
1980	(Czechoslovakia) Hana Mandlíková	(United States) Andrea Jaeger	6–7^{(0–7)}, 6–2, 6–2
1981	(Czechoslovakia) Hana Mandlíková	(United States) Pam Casale	6–2, 6–2
1982	(United States) Leigh-Anne Thompson	(West Germany) Bettina Bunge	7–6^{(7–4)}, 6–3
1983	(United Kingdom) Jo Durie	(Czechoslovakia) Hana Mandlíková	2–6, 7–5, 6–4
1984	(United States) Martina Navratilova	(United States) Pam Shriver	6–4, 4–6, 7–5
1985	(United States) Kathy Rinaldi	(West Germany) Steffi Graf	6–4, 3–6, 6–4
1986	(West Germany) Steffi Graf	(United States) Molly Van Nostrand	7–5, 6–1
1987	(Bulgaria) Manuela Maleeva-Fragnière	(West Germany) Sylvia Hanika	1–6, 6–4, 6–1
1988	(West Germany) Steffi Graf	(France) Nathalie Tauziat	6–0, 6–1
1989	(West Germany) Steffi Graf	(Hungary) Andrea Temesvári	7–5, 6–2

=== Doubles ===
Year	Champions	Runners-up	Score
1978	(South Africa) Ilana Kloss (South Africa) Marise Kruger	(United States) Barbara Potter (Australia) Pam Whytcross	6–3, 6–1
1979	(United States) Tracy Austin (Netherlands) Betty Stöve	(Socialist Federal Republic of Yugoslavia) Mima Jaušovec (Czechoslovakia) Regina Maršíková	7–6, 2–6, 6–4
1980	(Czechoslovakia) Martina Navratilova (United States) Candy Reynolds	(United States) Pam Shriver (Netherlands) Betty Stöve	4–6, 6–3, 6–1
1981	(United States) Rosemary Casals (Australia) Wendy Turnbull	(United States) Candy Reynolds (Netherlands) Betty Stöve	6–2, 6–1
1982	(United States) Barbara Potter (United States) Sharon Walsh	(United States) Rosemary Casals (Australia) Wendy Turnbull	6–1, 6–4
1983	(United Kingdom) Jo Durie (United States) Sharon Walsh	(South Africa) Rosalyn Fairbank (United States) Candy Reynolds	4–6, 7–5, 6–3
1984	(United States) Martina Navratilova (United States) Pam Shriver	(United Kingdom) Jo Durie (United States) Ann Kiyomura	7–6, 3–6, 6–2
1985	(United States) Kathy Jordan (Australia) Elizabeth Smylie	(West Germany) Claudia Kohde-Kilsch (Czechoslovakia) Helena Suková	7–6, 6–3
1986	(United States) Betsy Nagelsen (Australia) Elizabeth Smylie	(West Germany) Steffi Graf (Czechoslovakia) Helena Suková	7–6, 6–3
1987	(United States) Gigi Fernández (United States) Lori McNeil	(United Kingdom) Anne Hobbs (Australia) Elizabeth Smylie	6–3, 6–2
1988	(Czechoslovakia) Jana Novotná (Czechoslovakia) Helena Suková	(United States) Gigi Fernández (United States) Robin White	6–3, 6–2
1989	(West Germany) Steffi Graf (United States) Pam Shriver	(United States) Louise Allen (Peru) Laura Gildemeister	6–2, 6–4
