= Leslie Allen (tennis) =

American tennis player (born 1957)

- Country (sports): United States
- Born: March 12, 1957 (age 68) Cleveland, U.S.
- Height: 5 ft 10 in (1.78 m)
- Turned pro: 1977
- Retired: 1987
- Plays: Right-handed
- College: USC
- Prize money: $334,697

Singles
- Career record: 12–21 (36.4%)
- Career titles: 1
- Highest ranking: No. 17 (February 15, 1981)

Grand Slam singles results
- Australian Open: 3R (1982)
- French Open: 4R (1979, 1980, 1981)
- Wimbledon: 3R (1981)
- US Open: 3R (1979)

Doubles
- Career record: 11–15 (42.3%)
- Career titles: 5
- Highest ranking: No. 10 (February 6, 1983)

Grand Slam doubles results
- Australian Open: 2R (1982)
- French Open: 3R (1983, 1984)
- Wimbledon: 3R (1982, 1984)
- US Open: 3R (1982, 1983)

Grand Slam mixed doubles results
- French Open: F (1983)
- Wimbledon: 3R (1982)
- US Open: 2R (1981, 1982)

Leslie Allen (born March 12, 1957) is an American retired professional tennis player.

== Career ==
Unranked in junior tennis, Leslie Allen was an ATA, NCAA & WTA Champion. Allen was a member of the University of Southern California national championship team and in 1977 graduated magna cum laude with a Bachelor of Arts in speech communications. She joined the WTA Tour in 1977 and went on to reach a career high ranking of No. 17 in the world in February 1981.

In 1981, Allen became the first African American woman to win a significant pro tennis tournament since Althea Gibson in 1958 when she won the Avon Championships of Detroit, although Renee Blount is also credited with this feat because she won the Futures of Columbus in 1979. Allen qualified for the season-ending 1981 Avon Championships which featured the eight best players of the winter Avon Championships Circuit. She was also a mixed doubles finalist at the 1983 French Open partnering Charles Strode.

== Retirement ==
After retiring from professional tennis, she became a television broadcaster and was also elected to the WTA Board of Directors. Allen founded the Leslie Allen Foundation to introduce young people to the 100+ careers behind the scenes in pro tennis. Through the Foundation's Win4Life program students are challenged to use the Win4Life 4D's (Desire, Dedication, Determination, Discipline) to succeed on and off the court. Allen currently works as a real estate agent in New Jersey and is a motivational speaker.

== Grand Slam finals ==
=== Mixed doubles (1 runner-up) ===
Result	Year	Championship	Surface	Partner	Opponents	Score
Loss	1983	French Open	Clay	(United States) Charles Strode	(United States) Barbara Jordan (United States) Eliot Teltscher	2–6, 3–6
