= 1982 Wimbledon Championships – Men's singles qualifying =

Men's singles qualifying
- 1982 Wimbledon Championships

Events
Singles	men	women		boys	girls
Doubles	men	women	mixed	boys	girls
WC Singles	men	women	quad
WC Doubles	men	women	quad
Legends	men	women	seniors

Qualification
Singles	men	women
Doubles	men	women	mixed
- Wimbledon Championships

Players who neither had high enough rankings nor received wild cards to enter the main draw of the annual Wimbledon Tennis Championships participated in a qualifying tournament held one week before the event. Several players withdrew from the main draw after qualifying had commenced, leading to the highest ranked players who lost in the final qualifying round to be entered into the main draw as lucky losers.

== Seeds ==
1. (India) Vijay Amritraj (qualified)
2. (South Africa) Eddie Edwards (qualified)
3. (Switzerland) Ivan Dupasquier (second round)
4. (Australia) Cliff Letcher (second round)
5. (South Africa) Brent Pirow (qualifying competition, lucky loser)
6. (South Africa) Mike Myburg (qualifying competition, lucky loser)
7. (Australia) Paul Kronk (first round)
8. (Australia) Greg Whitecross (qualifying competition, lucky loser)
9. (United States) Bruce Kleege (second round)
10. (Australia) Pat Cash (first round)
11. (United States) Chris Dunk (qualified)
12. (United States) Craig Wittus (qualified)
13. (United States) Richard Meyer (qualifying competition, lucky loser)
14. (United States) Matt Mitchell (first round)
15. (United States) Drew Gitlin (qualified)
16. (South Africa) Schalk van der Merwe (qualified)
17. -
18. (United States) Larry Stefanki (qualified)
19. (Sweden) Henrik Sundström (qualified)
20. (United States) Tony Graham (qualifying competition)
21. (Australia) Broderick Dyke (qualifying competition)
22. (United States) Rand Evett (qualified)
23. (New Zealand) David Mustard (second round)
24. (India) Anand Amritraj (first round)
25. (United States) Mike Gandolfo (qualifying competition)
26. (New Zealand) Jeff Simpson (first round)
27. (Australia) Syd Ball (qualified)
28. (South Africa) Ray Moore (second round)
29. (United States) Charles Strode (first round)
30. (Australia) Warren Maher (first round)
31. (United States) Morris Strode (first round)
32. (United States) Glen Holroyd (qualifying competition)

== Qualifiers ==
1. (India) Vijay Amritraj
2. (South Africa) Eddie Edwards
3. (South Africa) David Schneider
4. (United States) Rand Evett
5. (Australia) Peter Doohan
6. (India) Sashi Menon
7. (Sweden) Henrik Sundström
8. (Australia) Syd Ball
9. (United States) Larry Stefanki
10. (United Kingdom) Colin Dowdeswell
11. (United States) Chris Dunk
12. (United States) Craig Wittus
13. (United States) David Dowlen
14. (Australia) Michael Fancutt
15. (United States) Drew Gitlin
16. (South Africa) Schalk van der Merwe

== Lucky losers ==
1. (Australia) Greg Whitecross
2. (South Africa) Brent Pirow
3. (United States) Richard Meyer
4. (South Africa) Mike Myburg

== Qualifying draw ==
Key

- Q = Qualifier
- WC = Wild card
- LL = Lucky loser
- Alt = Alternate
- ITF = ITF entry
- PR = Protected ranking
- SR = Special ranking
- SE = Special exempt
- JE = Junior exempt
- JR = Junior Accelerator Programme entrant
- CO = College Accelerator Programme entrant
- NG = Next Gen Accelerator Program entrant
- w/o = Walkover
- r = Retired
- d = Defaulted

=== First qualifier ===
First round
1	(India) Vijay Amritraj	6	6
(United States) Terry Bennett	1	4
Alt	(United Kingdom) Clive Kightley	1	4
(South Africa) Christo van Rensburg	6	6
(South Africa) Brian Levine	0	6	6
(South Africa) Andrew Burrow	6	1	3
WC	(United Kingdom) Martin Guntrip	7	6	6
32	(United States) Glen Holroyd	6	7	8

Second round
1	(India) Vijay Amritraj	6	6
(South Africa) Christo van Rensburg	3	3
(South Africa) Brian Levine	7	4	2
32	(United States) Glen Holroyd	6	6	6

Qualifying competition
1	(India) Vijay Amritraj	6	3	7	6	6
32	(United States) Glen Holroyd	7	6	5	4	2

=== Second qualifier ===
First round
2	(South Africa) Eddie Edwards	6	6	8
(United States) Garth Haynes	7	4	6
(Mexico) Jorge Lozano	3	5
(United States) George Hardie	6	7
(India) Ranjit Mani	3	0
(South Africa) Rory Chappell	6	6
(United Kingdom) Roger Cowell	3	1
25	(United States) Mike Gandolfo	6	6

Second round
2	(South Africa) Eddie Edwards	7	6	7
(United States) George Hardie	5	7	5
(South Africa) Rory Chappell	7	5	4
25	(United States) Mike Gandolfo	5	7	6

Qualifying competition
2	(South Africa) Eddie Edwards	6	6	7	3	6
25	(United States) Mike Gandolfo	4	7	6	6	1

=== Third qualifier ===
First round
3	(Switzerland) Ivan Dupasquier	6	6
WC	(United Kingdom) Craig Haworth	4	3
(South Africa) David Schneider	6	7
(United States) Scott Carnahan	4	5
(Australia) Max Bates	3	6	11
(United Kingdom) John Whiteford	6	4	13
(United States) Jeff Turpin	6	6
29	(United States) Charles Strode	3	4

Second round
3	(Switzerland) Ivan Dupasquier	6	1
(South Africa) David Schneider	7	6
(United Kingdom) John Whiteford	6	3	3
(United States) Jeff Turpin	4	6	6

Qualifying competition
(South Africa) David Schneider	6	6	3	6	6
(United States) Jeff Turpin	4	4	6	7	4

=== Fourth qualifier ===
First round
4	(Australia) Cliff Letcher	4	7	6
(United Kingdom) Nick Fulwood	6	6	4
(United States) Matt Anger	5	7	4
(West Germany) Franz-Josef Wich	7	6	6
(United States) Graham Espley-Jones	3	6	6
(United States) Sean Brawley	6	4	3
(Australia) John Frawley	0	5
22	(United States) Rand Evett	6	7

Second round
4	(Australia) Cliff Letcher	6	6	2
(West Germany) Franz-Josef Wich	3	7	6
(United States) Graham Espley-Jones	6	2
22	(United States) Rand Evett	7	6

Qualifying competition
(West Germany) Franz-Josef Wich	3	4	7	6
22	(United States) Rand Evett	6	6	6	7

=== Fifth qualifier ===
First round
5	(South Africa) Brent Pirow	7	6
(United Kingdom) David Felgate	6	4
WC	(United Kingdom) Robin Scott	6	4
(United States) Gordon Davis	7	6
WC	(Australia) Peter Doohan	6	6
(Spain) Juan-Carlos Andrade	3	1
(Mexico) León Hamui	1	6	6
Alt	(United Kingdom) Stephen Zackon	6	1	2

Second round
5	(South Africa) Brent Pirow	6	6
(United States) Gordon Davis	3	1
WC	(Australia) Peter Doohan	6	6
(Mexico) León Hamui	1	1

Qualifying competition
5	(South Africa) Brent Pirow	3	4	7	3
WC	(Australia) Peter Doohan	6	6	6	6

=== Sixth qualifier ===
First round
6	(South Africa) Mike Myburg	6	6
(United States) Adam Scheinman	3	4
(South Africa) Tian Viljoen	7	6
(South Africa) Arnold Pienaar	6	3
(Australia) Tony Withers	1	2
(India) Sashi Menon	6	6
(United States) Mark Freedman	3	3
28	(South Africa) Ray Moore	6	6

Second round
6	(South Africa) Mike Myburg	6	7
(South Africa) Tian Viljoen	3	6
(India) Sashi Menon	6	4	6
28	(South Africa) Ray Moore	3	6	1

Qualifying competition
6	(South Africa) Mike Myburg	5	6	6	3	4
(India) Sashi Menon	7	2	4	6	6

=== Seventh qualifier ===
First round
7	(Australia) Paul Kronk	6	1
(Switzerland) Jakob Hlasek	7	6
(United Kingdom) Jeremy Dier	6	6
(South Africa) Deon Joubert	3	0
(Australia) Peter MacDonald	1	6	6
(United States) Steve Meister	6	2	4
(United States) Tracy Delatte	4	1
19	(Sweden) Henrik Sundström	6	6

Second round
(Switzerland) Jakob Hlasek	4	7	7
(United Kingdom) Jeremy Dier	6	6	5
(Australia) Peter MacDonald	0	3
19	(Sweden) Henrik Sundström	6	6

Qualifying competition
(Switzerland) Jakob Hlasek	3	3	6
19	(Sweden) Henrik Sundström	6	6	7

=== Eighth qualifier ===
First round
8	(Australia) Greg Whitecross	6	7
(United States) Rodney Crowley	3	6
(United States) Bob Weise	6	7
(United Kingdom) Michael Dawe	3	5
(Australia) Peter Johnston	7	6
(Belgium) Jan Vanlangendonck	6	3
(Australia) Peter Smylie	4	2
27	(Australia) Syd Ball	6	6

Second round
8	(Australia) Greg Whitecross	6	6
(United States) Bob Weise	1	2
(Australia) Peter Johnston	6	7	5
27	(Australia) Syd Ball	7	6	7

Qualifying competition
8	(Australia) Greg Whitecross	7	3	6	4
27	(Australia) Syd Ball	6	6	7	6

=== Ninth qualifier ===
First round
9	(United States) Bruce Kleege	6	6
Alt	(United Kingdom) Richard Stoakes	3	3
(United States) Bruce Nichols	7	4	6
WC	(United Kingdom) Nigel Sears	5	6	3
(United Kingdom) Malcolm Bryant	4	4
WC	(United Kingdom) Barry Mills	6	6
(United States) Tim Anderson	6	3	5
18	(United States) Larry Stefanki	4	6	7

Second round
9	(United States) Bruce Kleege	7	1	4
(United States) Bruce Nichols	5	6	6
WC	(United Kingdom) Barry Mills	1	4
18	(United States) Larry Stefanki	6	6

Qualifying competition
(United States) Bruce Nichols	3	2	6	4
18	(United States) Larry Stefanki	6	6	4	6

=== Tenth qualifier ===
First round
10	(Australia) Pat Cash	4	4
(United Kingdom) Colin Dowdeswell	6	6
(France) Guy Forget	7	7
(United States) Michael Kures	6	6
(Switzerland) Markus Günthardt	2	6	3
WC	(United States) Mike Brunnberg	6	1	6
(United States) Tom Cain	6	7
24	(India) Anand Amritraj	4	6

Second round
(United Kingdom) Colin Dowdeswell	6	7
(France) Guy Forget	4	6
WC	(United States) Mike Brunnberg	4	3
(United States) Tom Cain	6	6

Qualifying competition
(United Kingdom) Colin Dowdeswell	6	4	6	3	6
(United States) Tom Cain	4	6	4	6	4

=== Eleventh qualifier ===
First round
11	(United States) Chris Dunk	6	6
(United States) Craig Edwards	4	4
(United States) William Porter	6	6
(West Germany) Christian Jessell	3	3
(Australia) John McCurdy	1	3
(France) Trevor Allan	6	6
(United States) Eric Sherbeck	2	6	6
26	(New Zealand) Jeff Simpson	6	2	3

Second round
11	(United States) Chris Dunk	7	6
(United States) William Porter	5	3
(France) Trevor Allan	4	3
(United States) Eric Sherbeck	6	6

Qualifying competition
11	(United States) Chris Dunk	7	6	7
(United States) Eric Sherbeck	6	3	6

=== Twelfth qualifier ===
First round
12	(United States) Craig Wittus	6	6
(Italy) Gianni Ocleppo	4	4
(United Kingdom) Stephen Shaw	6	6
(United Kingdom) Stephen Charlery	3	2
(United Kingdom) Ian Currie	2	6	3
(Uganda) Patrick Tibbs	6	3	1^{r}
(United States) Cary Leeds	4	3
21	(Australia) Broderick Dyke	6	6

Second round
12	(United States) Craig Wittus	6	6
(United Kingdom) Stephen Shaw	3	2
(United Kingdom) Ian Currie	4	4
21	(Australia) Broderick Dyke	6	6

Qualifying competition
12	(United States) Craig Wittus	6	7	7
21	(Australia) Broderick Dyke	4	6	6

=== Thirteenth qualifier ===
First round
13	(United States) Richard Meyer	6	6	7
(South Africa) Frank Punčec	7	3	5
(United States) Rick Meyers	4	6	3
(France) Jérôme Vanier	6	4	6
(United States) David Dowlen	6	6
(South Africa) Nicholas Badenhorst	2	2
(South Africa) Christo Steyn	4	3
23	(New Zealand) David Mustard	6	6

Second round
13	(United States) Richard Meyer	6	5	6
(France) Jérôme Vanier	4	7	4
(United States) David Dowlen	6	6
23	(New Zealand) David Mustard	3	3

Qualifying competition
13	(United States) Richard Meyer	4	7	4	2
(United States) David Dowlen	6	6	6	6

=== Fourteenth qualifier ===
First round
14	(United States) Matt Mitchell	1	3
(Australia) Michael Fancutt	6	6
(United Kingdom) Chris Louw	4	6	6
WC	(United Kingdom) Paul Heath	6	3	3
(France) Tarik Benhabiles	7	0	2
(United Kingdom) Willie Davies	6	6	6
(Australia) Brad Guan	7	6	6
31	(United States) Morris Strode	6	7	2

Second round
(Australia) Michael Fancutt	7	5	6
(United Kingdom) Chris Louw	6	7	4
(United Kingdom) Willie Davies	6	6	1
(Australia) Brad Guan	7	4	6

Qualifying competition
(Australia) Michael Fancutt	6	6	6	3	6
(Australia) Brad Guan	7	3	4	6	3

=== Fifteenth qualifier ===
First round
15	(United States) Drew Gitlin	6	6
(South Africa) Leon Naude	4	2
(Japan) Hirato Shibata	3	4
(France) Loïc Courteau	6	6
(West Germany) Christoph Zipf	7	3	6
(Australia) Wayne Pascoe	6	6	2
(South Africa) Barry Moir	6	4	2
20	(United States) Tony Graham	3	6	6

Second round
15	(United States) Drew Gitlin	6	6
(France) Loïc Courteau	4	2
(West Germany) Christoph Zipf	6	3
20	(United States) Tony Graham	7	6

Qualifying competition
15	(United States) Drew Gitlin	6	6	6
20	(United States) Tony Graham	3	4	4

=== Sixteenth qualifier ===
First round
16	(South Africa) Schalk van der Merwe	6	6
(Canada) Nick Mohtadi	3	4
(United States) Jonathan Canter	6	6
(South Africa) Gustav Fichardt	1	4
(United Kingdom) Stuart Bale	6	5
(United States) Dick Metz	7	7
(United Kingdom) Howard McGuiness	3	6	8
30	(Australia) Warren Maher	6	4	6

Second round
16	(South Africa) Schalk van der Merwe	6	7
(United States) Jonathan Canter	2	5
(United States) Dick Metz	6	6
(United Kingdom) Howard McGuiness	3	3

Qualifying competition
16	(South Africa) Schalk van der Merwe	6	6	6
(United States) Dick Metz	4	4	2
