= 1982 Wimbledon Championships – Women's singles qualifying =

Women's singles qualifying
- 1982 Wimbledon Championships

Events
Singles	men	women		boys	girls
Doubles	men	women	mixed	boys	girls
WC Singles	men	women	quad
WC Doubles	men	women	quad
Legends	men	women	seniors

Qualification
Singles	men	women
Doubles	men	women	mixed
- Wimbledon Championships

Players who neither had high enough rankings nor received wild cards to enter the main draw of the annual Wimbledon Tennis Championships participated in a qualifying tournament held one week before the event.

== Qualifiers ==
1. (South Africa) Elizabeth Gordon
2. (Australia) Brenda Remilton-Ward
3. (South Africa) Tanya Harford
4. (United States) Kim Steinmetz
5. (United States) Renee Blount
6. (Bulgaria) Manuela Maleeva
7. (Australia) Elizabeth Smylie
8. (South Africa) Susan Rollinson

== Qualifying draw ==
Key

- Q = Qualifier
- WC = Wild card
- LL = Lucky loser
- Alt = Alternate
- ITF = ITF entry
- PR = Protected ranking
- SR = Special ranking
- SE = Special exempt
- JE = Junior exempt
- JR = Junior Accelerator Programme entrant
- CO = College Accelerator Programme entrant
- NG = Next Gen Accelerator Program entrant
- w/o = Walkover
- r = Retired
- d = Defaulted

=== First qualifier ===
First round
1	(South Africa) Beverly Mould	6	6
8	M. Hooker	3	2
4	(United States) Heather Ludloff	6	6
5	(United States) Tina Mochizuki	0	0
2	(South Africa) Elizabeth Gordon	6	6
7	(United Kingdom) Sally Reeves	3	4
3	(Sweden) Catrin Jexell	6	6
6	(South Africa) Lise Gregory	4	3

Second round
(South Africa) Beverly Mould	7	6
(United States) Heather Ludloff	6	4
(South Africa) Elizabeth Gordon	6	6
(Sweden) Catrin Jexell	2	2

Qualifying competition
(South Africa) Beverly Mould	6	6	7
(South Africa) Elizabeth Gordon	7	3	9

=== Second qualifier ===
First round
1	(Canada) Carling Bassett-Seguso	6	6
8	(France) Isabelle Vernhes	3	3
4	(Australia) Maree Booth	6	6
5	(Australia) Wendy Gilchrist	2	4
2	(Australia) Brenda Remilton-Ward	5	6	9
7	(Australia) Pam Whytcross	7	2	7
3	(United States) Beth Herr	6	6
6	(Australia) Nancy Harris	1	4

Second round
(Canada) Carling Bassett-Seguso	6	6
(Australia) Maree Booth	4	2
(Australia) Brenda Remilton-Ward	6	6
(United States) Beth Herr	4	4

Qualifying competition
(Canada) Carling Bassett-Seguso	1	6	5
(Australia) Brenda Remilton-Ward	6	2	7

=== Third qualifier ===
First round
1	(United States) Nancy Neviaser	7	6
8	(Netherlands) Yvette Flu	5	2
4	(Australia) Linda Cassell	6	6
5	(United Kingdom) Linda Geeves	4	1
2	(South Africa) Tanya Harford	6	6
7	(Japan) Naoko Sato	2	3
3	(United Kingdom) Belinda Thompson	6	1	6
6	(Australia) Kerryn Pratt	2	6	2

Second round
(United States) Nancy Neviaser	6	3	7
(Australia) Linda Cassell	3	6	5
(South Africa) Tanya Harford	6	6
(United Kingdom) Belinda Thompson	4	2

Qualifying competition
(United States) Nancy Neviaser	4	3
(South Africa) Tanya Harford	6	6

=== Fourth qualifier ===
First round
1	(South Africa) Jennifer Mundel	1	6	6
8	E. Badenhorst	6	3	2
4	(Switzerland) Karin Stampfli	6	6
5	L. Baylis	1	1
2	(United States) Kim Steinmetz	6	6
7	(Japan) Masako Yanagi	3	4
3	(Australia) Elizabeth Minter	6	7
6	(United Kingdom) Joy Tacon	3	5

Second round
(South Africa) Jennifer Mundel	7	3	6
(Switzerland) Karin Stampfli	5	6	3
(United States) Kim Steinmetz	6	3	6
(Australia) Elizabeth Minter	2	6	2

Qualifying competition
(South Africa) Jennifer Mundel	5	0
(United States) Kim Steinmetz	7	6

=== Fifth qualifier ===
First round
1	(United States) Renee Blount	6	6
8	(South Africa) Kim Seddon	4	3
4	(Australia) Bernadette Randall	6	7
5	(United States) Carol Watson	2	5
2	(Australia) Amanda Tobin	4	6	6
7	(Switzerland) Isabelle Villiger	6	2	4
3	(United States) Trey Lewis	6	6
6	(Australia) Miranda Yates	1	3

Second round
(United States) Renee Blount	6	6
(Australia) Bernadette Randall	2	3
(Australia) Amanda Tobin	7	6
(United States) Trey Lewis	6	4

Qualifying competition
(United States) Renee Blount	7	6
(Australia) Amanda Tobin	6	3

=== Sixth qualifier ===
First round
1	(United Kingdom) Sara Gomer	6	6
8	(United States) Cathy Farrell	2	4
4	(United Kingdom) Cathy Drury	7	6
5	(United Kingdom) Rina Einy	6	3
2	(Bulgaria) Manuela Maleeva	6	4	6
7	(United States) Kathrin Keil	2	6	0
3	(Jamaica) Joni Van Ryck De Groot	6	6
6	(United States) Jan Blackstad	1	3

Second round
(United Kingdom) Sara Gomer	5	6	6
(United Kingdom) Cathy Drury	7	3	2
(Bulgaria) Manuela Maleeva	4	6	6
(Jamaica) Joni Van Ryck De Groot	6	0	3

Qualifying competition
(United Kingdom) Sara Gomer	6	6	4
(Bulgaria) Manuela Maleeva	2	7	6

=== Seventh qualifier ===
First round
1	(United States) Susan Rimes	6	7
8	(Sweden) Catarina Lindqvist	2	6
4	J. Lewis	6	6
5	(New Zealand) Chris Newton	4	1
2	(Australia) Elizabeth Smylie	6	6
7	(Chile) Germaine Ohaco	4	0
3	(United States) Sheila McInerney	3	7	6
6	(New Zealand) Linda Stewart	6	6	3

Second round
(United States) Susan Rimes	6	4	9
J. Lewis	2	6	7
(Australia) Elizabeth Smylie	6	6	6
(United States) Sheila McInerney	7	0	1

Qualifying competition
(United States) Susan Rimes	6	1	2
(Australia) Elizabeth Smylie	4	6	6

=== Eighth qualifier ===
First round
1	(Switzerland) Christianne Jolissaint	6	6
8	(Australia) Nerida Gregory	2	2
4	(United Kingdom) Julie Salmon	6	6
5	(United States) Donna Rubin	3	4
2	(South Africa) Susan Rollinson	6	2	7
7	(Hong Kong) Patricia Hy-Boulais	3	6	5
3	(United Kingdom) Nicola Lusty	7	6
6	(United Kingdom) A. Jones	6	3

Second round
(Switzerland) Christianne Jolissaint	6	6
(United Kingdom) Julie Salmon	0	2
(South Africa) Susan Rollinson	6	6
(United Kingdom) Nicola Lusty	2	0

Qualifying competition
(Switzerland) Christianne Jolissaint	1	4
(South Africa) Susan Rollinson	6	6
