= 1982 Benson and Hedges Open – Singles =

Singles
- 1982 Benson and Hedges Open

Final
- Champion: (United States) Tim Wilkison
- Runner-up: (New Zealand) Russell Simpson
- Score: 6–4, 6–4, 6–4

Details
- Draw: 32
- Seeds: 8

Events
Singles	Doubles
← 1981 ·	ATP Auckland Open	· 1983 →

Tim Wilkison defeated Russell Simpson 6–4, 6–4, 6–4 to win the 1982 Heineken Open singles competition. Bill Scanlon was the champion but did not defend his title.

== Seeds ==
A champion seed is indicated in bold text while text in italics indicates the round in which that seed was eliminated.

1. (New Zealand) Chris Lewis (quarterfinals)
2. (United States) Tim Wilkison **(champion)**
3. (United States) Steve Krulevitz (first round)
4. (Australia) David Carter (second round)
5. (United Kingdom) Richard Lewis (second round)
6. (United States) Robert Van't Hof (semifinals)
7. (United States) Martin Davis (second round)
8. (New Zealand) Russell Simpson (final)

== Draw ==
- NB: The Final was the best of 5 sets while all other rounds were the best of 3 sets.

=== Final ===
Final
8	(New Zealand) Russell Simpson	4	4	4
2	(United States) **Tim Wilkison**	**6**	**6**	**6**

=== Section 1 ===
First round
1	(New Zealand) **C Lewis**	**7**	**6**
(Canada) N Mohtadi	6	2
(United States) **R Hightower**	**6**	**6**
(New Zealand) D Lewis	4	0
(New Zealand) **K Evernden**	**7**	**6**
(Israel) D Schneider	6	3
(United States) J Delouie	4	**7**	3
8	(New Zealand) **R Simpson**	**6**	6	**6**
4	(Australia) **D Carter**	**6**	**6**
(New Zealand) J Simpson	4	2
(United States) **M Mitchell**	**6**	**6**
(United States) J Delaney	4	1
(United States) **C Stansbury**	**6**	**6**
(New Zealand) C England	2	4
(United States) S Meister	4	2
6	(United States) **R Van't Hof**	**6**	**6**

Second round
1	(New Zealand) **C Lewis**	**6**	**6**
(United States) R Hightower	2	3
(New Zealand) K Evernden	**6**	3	4
8	(New Zealand) **R Simpson**	2	**6**	**6**
4	(Australia) D Carter	3	**6**	5
(United States) **M Mitchell**	**6**	0	**7**
(United States) C Stansbury	2	3
6	(United States) **R Van't Hof**	**6**	**6**

Quarterfinals
1	(New Zealand) C Lewis	1	**6**	4
8	(New Zealand) **R Simpson**	**6**	2	**6**
(United States) M Mitchell	6	**7**	3
6	(United States) **R Van't Hof**	**7**	6	**6**

Semifinals
8	(New Zealand) **R Simpson**	**6**	**7**
6	(United States) R Van't Hof	2	5

=== Section 2 ===
First round
7	(United States) **M Davis**	**6**	**6**
(New Zealand) D Mustard	3	0
(United States) **C Mayotte**	**6**	**6**
(United Kingdom) J Smith	1	4
(New Zealand) **B Derlin**	**6**	**6**
(United States) D Siegler	0	3
(United States) **L Bourne**	**6**	**6**
3	(United States) S Krulevitz	4	3
5	(United Kingdom) **R Lewis**	5	**6**	**12**
(New Zealand) O Parun	**7**	3	10
(United States) **L Stefanki**	**6**	**6**
(New Zealand) M Lewis	1	2
(United States) **C Dunk**	4	**6**	**6**
(United States) M Estep	**6**	4	4
(United States) D Metz	3	3
2	(United States) **T Wilkison**	**6**	**6**

Second round
7	(United States) M Davis	**6**	3	5
(United States) **C Mayotte**	4	**6**	**7**
(New Zealand) B Derlin	**6**	3	1
(United States) **L Bourne**	3	**6**	**6**
5	(United Kingdom) R Lewis	3	2
(United States) **L Stefanki**	**6**	**6**
(United States) C Dunk	6	3
2	(United States) **T Wilkison**	**7**	**6**

Quarterfinals
(United States) **C Mayotte**	2	**6**	**6**
(United States) L Bourne	**6**	3	1
(United States) L Stefanki	3	4
2	(United States) **T Wilkison**	**6**	**6**

Semifinals
(United States) C Mayotte	2	4
2	(United States) **T Wilkison**	**6**	**6**
