= 1982 Benson and Hedges Open – Doubles =

Doubles
- 1982 Benson and Hedges Open

Final
- Champions: (United Kingdom) Andrew Jarrett (United Kingdom) Jonathan Smith
- Runners-up: (United States) Larry Stefanki (United States) Robert Van't Hof
- Score: 7–5, 7–6

Details
- Draw: 16
- Seeds: 4

Events
Singles	Doubles
- ATP Auckland Open

Ferdi Taygan and Tim Wilkison were the defending champions, but Taygan did not compete this year. Wilkison teamed up with Chris Lewis and lost in the first round to James Delaney and Ron Hightower.

Andrew Jarrett and Jonathan Smith won the title by defeating Larry Stefanki and Robert Van't Hof 7–5, 7–6 in the final.

== Seeds ==
1. (New Zealand) Chris Lewis / (United States) Tim Wilkison (first round)
2. (Australia) David Carter / (United States) Mike Estep (first round)
3. (United States) Larry Stefanki / (United States) Robert Van't Hof (final)
4. (United States) Steve Krulevitz / (United States) Chris Mayotte (quarterfinals)

== Draw ==
Key

- Q = Qualifier
- WC = Wild card
- LL = Lucky loser
- Alt = Alternate
- ITF = ITF entry
- PR = Protected ranking
- SR = Special ranking
- SE = Special exempt
- JE = Junior exempt
- JR = Junior Accelerator Programme entrant
- CO = College Accelerator Programme entrant
- NG = Next Gen Accelerator Program entrant
- w/o = Walkover
- r = Retired
- d = Defaulted

=== Draw ===
First round
1	(New Zealand) C Lewis (United States) T Wilkison	4	4
(United States) J Delaney (United States) R Hightower	6	6
(New Zealand) B Derlin (New Zealand) J Simpson	6	6
(New Zealand) M Lewis (New Zealand) D Mustard	4	1
4	(United States) S Krulevitz (United States) C Mayotte	6	6
(New Zealand) K Evernden (New Zealand) D Lewis	2	4
(United Kingdom) A Jarrett (United Kingdom) J Smith	3	6	7
(United Kingdom) R Lewis (South Africa) D Schneider	6	3	5
(United States) L Bourne (United States) M Mitchell	6	7
(United States) D Metz (United States) E Sherbeck	2	5
(United States) J DiLouie (United States) S Meister	2	2
3	(United States) L Stefanki (United States) R Van't Hof	6	6
(United States) M Davis (United States) C Dunk	6	6
(West Germany) Stefan Reich (United States) C Stansbury	3	2
(New Zealand) O Parun (New Zealand) R Simpson	4	7	6
2	(Australia) D Carter (United States) M Estep	6	6	2

Quarterfinals
(United States) J Delaney (United States) R Hightower	6	6	4
(New Zealand) B Derlin (New Zealand) J Simpson	7	3	6
4	(United States) S Krulevitz (United States) C Mayotte	2	4
(United Kingdom) A Jarrett (United Kingdom) J Smith	6	6
(United States) L Bourne (United States) M Mitchell	3	3
3	(United States) L Stefanki (United States) R Van't Hof	6	6
(United States) M Davis (United States) C Dunk	3	6	7
(New Zealand) O Parun (New Zealand) R Simpson	6	4	6

Semifinals
(New Zealand) B Derlin (New Zealand) J Simpson	6	5	2
(United Kingdom) A Jarrett (United Kingdom) J Smith	4	7	6
3	(United States) L Stefanki (United States) R Van't Hof	6	6
(United States) M Davis (United States) C Dunk	3	2

Final
(United Kingdom) A Jarrett (United Kingdom) J Smith	7	7
3	(United States) L Stefanki (United States) R Van't Hof	5	6
