= Scheinman =

Scheinman is a surname. Notable people with the surname include:

- Adam Scheinman, American screenwriter and former professional tennis player
- Andrew Scheinman, American film and television producer
- Jenny Scheinman (born 1973), American jazz violinist
- Pinhas Scheinman (1912–1999), Israeli politician
- Victor Scheinman (1942–2016), American pioneer in the field of robotics
