= 1982 Wimbledon Championships – Boys' singles =

Boys' singles
- 1982 Wimbledon Championships

Final
- Champion: (Australia) Pat Cash
- Runner-up: (Sweden) Henrik Sundström
- Score: 6–4, 6–7^{(5–7)}, 6–3

Events
Singles	men	women		boys	girls
Doubles	men	women	mixed	boys	girls
WC Singles	men	women	quad
WC Doubles	men	women	quad
Legends	men	women	seniors
← 1981 ·	Wimbledon Championships	· 1983 →

Pat Cash defeated Henrik Sundström in the final, 6–4, 6–7^{(5–7)}, 6–3 to win the boys' singles tennis title at the 1982 Wimbledon Championships.

== Seeds ==
1. (Australia) Pat Cash (champion)
2. (Sweden) Henrik Sundström (final)
3. (Netherlands) Eric Wilborts (second round)
4. (France) Loïc Courteau (semifinals)
5. (France) Guy Forget (quarterfinals)
6. (United States) Michael Kures (first round)
7. (United States) Jonathan Canter (third round)
8. (France) Tarik Benhabiles (quarterfinals)

Click on the seed number of a player to go to their draw section.

== Draw ==
=== Key ===
- Q = Qualifier
- WC = Wild card
- LL = Lucky loser
- Alt = Alternate
- SE = Special exempt
- PR = Protected ranking
- ITF = ITF entry
- JE = Junior exempt
- w/o = Walkover
- r = Retired
- d = Defaulted
- SR = Special ranking

=== Finals ===
Quarterfinals
1	(Australia) Pat Cash	6	3	6
8	(France) Tarik Benhabiles	4	6	2
4	(France) Loïc Courteau	6	6
(United States) John Ross	3	4
5	(France) Guy Forget	3	4
(United States) Rick Leach	6	6
(Zimbabwe) Orlando Lourenco	2^{r}
2	(Sweden) Henrik Sundström	3

Semifinals
1	(Australia) Pat Cash	6	7
4	(France) Loïc Courteau	2	6
(United States) Rick Leach	7	6	2
2	(Sweden) Henrik Sundström	5	7	6

Final
1	(Australia) Pat Cash	6	6	6
2	(Sweden) Henrik Sundström	4	7	3

=== Top half ===
==== Section 1 ====
First round
1	(Australia) Pat Cash	6	6
(United Kingdom) Jason Clunie	2	2
(United Kingdom) Peter Moore	3	6	6
(Canada) Chris Pridham	6	1	3
(Switzerland) Jakob Hlasek	6	6
(Colombia) LA Zuleta	2	1
(Denmark) Martin Hansen	6	6	3
(South Africa) Pieter Aldrich	1	7	6
(Italy) Michele Fioroni	6	4	6
(Morocco) Driss Ben Omar	3	6	0
(West Germany) Ricki Osterthun	4	6	6
(Haiti) Ronald Agénor	6	3	1
(Finland) Olli Rahnasto	1	4
(West Germany) Hans Schwaier	6	6
(Sudan) Mandour Abdalla	1	1
8	(France) Tarik Benhabiles	6	6

Second round
1	(Australia) P Cash	6	6
(United Kingdom) P Moore	2	3
(Switzerland) J Hlasek	6	6
(South Africa) P Aldrich	0	2
(Italy) M Fioroni	1	4
(West Germany) R Osterthun	6	6
(West Germany) H Schwaier	6	3	6
8	(France) T Benhabiles	4	6	8

Third round
1	(Australia) P Cash	6	4	6
(Switzerland) J Hlasek	4	6	3
(West Germany) R Osterthun	3	6	1
8	(France) T Benhabiles	6	4	6

Quarterfinals
1	(Australia) P Cash	6	3	6
8	(France) T Benhabiles	4	6	2

==== Section 2 ====
First round
4	(France) Loïc Courteau	6	6
(Mexico) Fernando Pérez Pascal	2	2
(Austria) Norbert Teufelberger	4	3
(South Africa) Gary Muller	6	6
(India) Amit Bhargava	6	6
(Kenya) D Young	3	4
(Czechoslovakia) Karel Nováček	6	3	4
(United Kingdom) Craig Haworth	4	6	6
(United States) John Ross	6	6
(South Africa) Gustav Fichardt	2	4
(Israel) Menashe Tzur	6	7
(Mexico) RB Osuna	4	6
(Socialist Federal Republic of Yugoslavia) Goran Prpić	3	2
(Romania) Mihnea-Ion Năstase	6	6
(United Kingdom) Stuart Bale	4	6	6
6	(United States) Michael Kures	6	3	4

Second round
4	(France) L Courteau	6	6
(South Africa) G Muller	2	4
(India) A Bhargava	3	3
(United Kingdom) C Haworth	6	6
(United States) J Ross	3	6	6
(Israel) M Tzur	6	3	4
(Romania) M-I Năstase	4	4
(United Kingdom) S Bale	6	6

Third round
4	(France) L Courteau	3	7	6
(United Kingdom) C Haworth	6	6	2
(United States) J Ross	6	6	6
(United Kingdom) S Bale	1	7	4

Quarterfinals
4	(France) L Courteau	6	6
(United States) J Ross	3	4

=== Bottom half ===
==== Section 3 ====
First round
5	(France) Guy Forget	7	6
(Australia) John Frawley	5	0
(The Bahamas) Giovanni Zanetta	1	2
(United States) Chuck Willenborg	6	6
(Belgium) Olivier Amerlinck	6	6
(Peru) Carlos di Laura	4	4
(Mexico) Francisco Maciel	5	5
(United Kingdom) Paul Heath	7	7
(Paraguay) Juan Alberto Domínguez Ashwell	0	4
(Japan) Toshimasa Kawai	6	6
(West Germany) Michael Westphal	6	6
(Indonesia) Sulistyono	2	2
(United States) Rick Leach	7	6
(Uruguay) Victor Caldarelli	5	2
(New Zealand) David Lewis	1	7	4
3	(Netherlands) Eric Wilborts	6	5	6

Second round
5	(France) G Forget	6	6
(United States) C Willenborg	2	3
(Belgium) O Amerlinck	4	3
(United Kingdom) P Heath	6	6
(Japan) T Kawai	2	2
(West Germany) M Westphal	6	6
(United States) R Leach	6	7	6
3	(Netherlands) E Wilborts	7	6	2

Third round
5	(France) G Forget	6	6	6
(United Kingdom) P Heath	7	4	3
(West Germany) M Westphal	6	3	3
(United States) R Leach	3	6	6

Quarterfinals
5	(France) G Forget	3	4
(United States) R Leach	6	6

==== Section 4 ====
First round
(Malaysia) Rudy Foo	1	4
7	(United States) Jonathan Canter	6	6
(Philippines) Manny Tolentino	5	6	6
(Hong Kong) Kelvin Ng	7	2	2
(Brazil) J Marques Neto	6	6	3
(United Kingdom) David Felgate	7	4	6
(Zimbabwe) Orlando Lourenco	6	6
(Sri Lanka) Ganendran Subramaniam	0	1
(Israel) Amos Mansdorf	6	6
(Trinidad and Tobago) DB Gibson	0	2
(United Kingdom) Benjamin Knapp	2	0
(Japan) Satoshi Nakamura	6	6
(United Kingdom) Barry Mills	6	3	4
(Pakistan) Mushaf Zia	1	6	6
(Brazil) César Kist	4	1
2	(Sweden) Henrik Sundström	6	6

Second round
7	(United States) J Canter	6	6
(Philippines) M Tolentino	0	4
(United Kingdom) D Felgate	6	4
(Zimbabwe) O Lourenco	7	6
(Israel) A Mansdorf	6	6
(Japan) S Nakamura	4	3
(Pakistan) M Zia	1	0
2	(Sweden) H Sundström	6	6

Third round
7	(United States) J Canter	6	5	1
(Zimbabwe) O Lourenco	3	7	6
(Israel) A Mansdorf	6	2	4
2	(Sweden) H Sundström	3	6	6

Quarterfinals
(Zimbabwe) O Lourenco	2^{r}
2	(Sweden) H Sundström	3
