= 1982 Wimbledon Championships – Boys' doubles =

Boys' doubles
- 1982 Wimbledon Championships

Final
- Champions: (Australia) Pat Cash (Australia) John Frawley
- Runners-up: (United States) Rick Leach (United States) John Ross
- Score: 6–4, 6–7^{(5–7)}, 6–3

Events
Singles	men	women		boys	girls
Doubles	men	women	mixed	boys	girls
WC Singles	men	women	quad
WC Doubles	men	women	quad
Legends	men	women	seniors
Wimbledon Championships	· 1983 →

Pat Cash and John Frawley defeated Rick Leach and John Ross in the final, 6–4, 6–7^{(5–7)}, 6–3 to win the inaugural Boys' Doubles tennis title at the 1982 Wimbledon Championships.

== Seeds ==
1. (United States) Rick Leach / (United States) John Ross (final)
2. (United States) Jonathan Canter / (United States) Chuck Willenborg (semifinals)
3. (Australia) Pat Cash / (Australia) John Frawley (champions)
4. (France) Loïc Courteau / (France) Guy Forget (quarterfinals, withdrew)

== Draw ==
=== Key ===
- Q = Qualifier
- WC = Wild card
- LL = Lucky loser
- Alt = Alternate
- SE = Special exempt
- PR = Protected ranking
- ITF = ITF entry
- JE = Junior exempt
- w/o = Walkover
- r = Retired
- d = Defaulted
- SR = Special ranking

=== Draw ===
First round
1	(United States) Rick Leach (United States) John Ross
(Uruguay) Victor Caldarelli (Peru) Carlos di Laura	w/o
(Switzerland) Jakob Hlasek (Austria) Norbert Teufelberger	w/o
(France) Tarik Benhabiles (New Zealand) David Lewis
(United Kingdom) Craig Haworth (United Kingdom) Paul Heath	6	6	8
(Israel) Amos Mansdorf (Israel) Menashe Tzur	0	7	6
(West Germany) Ricki Osterthun (West Germany) Michael Westphal	w/o
4	(France) Loïc Courteau (France) Guy Forget
3	(Australia) Pat Cash (Australia) John Frawley	6	6
(Indonesia) Sulistyono (Philippines) Manny Tolentino	0	1
(Romania) Mihnea-Ion Năstase (Czechoslovakia) Karel Nováček	6	7
(Japan) Toshimasa Kawai (Japan) Satoshi Nakamura	2	5
(Sri Lanka) Ganendran Subramaniam (Pakistan) Mushaf Zia	6	3
(Paraguay) Juan Alberto Domínguez Ashwell (Colombia) LA Zuleta	7	6
(Mexico) RB Osuna (Canada) Chris Pridham	w/o
2	(United States) Jonathan Canter (United States) Chuck Willenborg

Quarterfinals
1	(United States) Rick Leach (United States) John Ross
(France) Tarik Benhabiles (New Zealand) David Lewis	w/o
(United Kingdom) Craig Haworth (United Kingdom) Paul Heath
4	(France) Loïc Courteau (France) Guy Forget	w/o
3	(Australia) Pat Cash (Australia) John Frawley	6	6
(Romania) Mihnea-Ion Năstase (Czechoslovakia) Karel Nováček	2	2
(Paraguay) Juan Alberto Domínguez Ashwell (Colombia) LA Zuleta	2	1
2	(United States) Jonathan Canter (United States) Chuck Willenborg	6	6

Semifinals
1	(United States) Rick Leach (United States) John Ross	6	6
(United Kingdom) Craig Haworth (United Kingdom) Paul Heath	3	4
3	(Australia) Pat Cash (Australia) John Frawley	7	6
2	(United States) Jonathan Canter (United States) Chuck Willenborg	6	3

Final
1	(United States) Rick Leach (United States) John Ross	3	4
3	(Australia) Pat Cash (Australia) John Frawley	6	6
