= Jonathan Canter =

American tennis player

- Country (sports): United States
- Born: June 4, 1965 (age 60) Los Angeles, California, United States
- Height: 6 ft 1 in (1.85 m)
- Turned pro: 1983
- Plays: Right-handed
- Prize money: $474,516

Singles
- Career record: 68–96
- Career titles: 1; 0 Challenger, 0 Futures
- Highest ranking: No. 36 (13 October 1986)

Grand Slam singles results
- Australian Open: 1R (1985, 1987, 1991)
- French Open: 2R (1986, 1987)
- Wimbledon: 2R (1986)
- US Open: 2R (1985, 1986, 1987)

Doubles
- Career record: 38–68
- Career titles: 0; 3 Challenger, 0 Futures
- Highest ranking: No. 84 (9 July 1990)

Grand Slam doubles results
- Australian Open: 3R (1985, 1989)
- French Open: 2R (1984)
- Wimbledon: 3R (1990)
- US Open: 3R (1989)

Grand Slam mixed doubles results
- Wimbledon: 2R (1991)
- Last updated on: 5 June 2022.

Jonathan Canter (born June 4, 1965) is a former professional tennis player from the United States.

== Early years ==
Canter was born in Los Angeles, where his father, Stanley S. Canter, worked as a film producer. His father, who was also manager of Jimmy Connors for a time, produced films such as Greystoke: The Legend of Tarzan, Lord of the Apes, Tarzan and the Lost City and Hornets' Nest, which he also wrote.

He won the boys 16 and under singles in the 1979 Ojai Tennis Tournament. The promising junior made the quarterfinals of the 1981 US Open and the following year, he reached further quarterfinals at the US Open and French Open. His best performances however came in the doubles. With countryman Michael Kures as his partner, Canter won the boys' doubles title at the 1982 US Open, beating Australians Pat Cash and John Frawley in the final. He also made the doubles semifinals at the 1982 Wimbledon Championships, partnering Chuck Willenborg. At the same event the following year, Canter was once again a singles quarterfinalist.

== Professional career ==
Canter never made the third round of the singles draw at a Grand Slam. He twice came close, the first time at the 1986 French Open when he squandered a two set lead over Jean-Philippe Fleurian in their second-round encounter. In the US Open that year, after coming from two sets down to defeat Tim Mayotte in his opening match, Canter was again at the wrong end of a second-round match decided in five sets, losing to Dan Goldie.

He did, however, reach the third round on four occasions in the doubles. His biggest win came during the 1990 Wimbledon Championships, where he and partner Bruce Derlin upset reigning champions John Fitzgerald and Anders Järryd.

In 1985, Canter won his only Grand Prix/ATP title, at the Melbourne Outdoor tournament. The following year, he would make it to No. 36 in the world. His best results that season were semifinal appearances at Montreal and Toronto. In Montreal, he had a win over world No. 4, Yannick Noah.

== Junior Grand Slam finals ==
=== Doubles: 2 (1 title, 1 runner-up) ===
Result	Year	Tournament	Surface	Partner	Opponents	Score
Loss	1982	French Open	Clay	(United States) Michael Kures	(Australia) Pat Cash (Australia) John Frawley	2–6, 6–7
Win	1982	US Open	Hard	(United States) Michael Kures	(Australia) Pat Cash (Australia) John Frawley	7–6, 6–2

== ATP career finals ==
=== Singles: 1 (1 title) ===
Legend Grand Slam Tournaments (0–0) ATP World Tour Finals (0–0) ATP World Tour Masters Series (0–0) ATP Championship Series (0–0) ATP World Series (1–0)	Finals by surface Hard (0–0) Clay (0–0) Grass (1–0) Carpet (0–0)	Finals by setting Outdoors (1–0) Indoors (0–0)

Result	W–L	Date	Tournament	Tier	Surface	Opponent	Score
Win	1–0	Dec 1985	Melbourne, Australia	Grand Prix	Grass	(Australia) Peter Doohan	5–7, 6–3, 6–4

== ATP Challenger and ITF Futures finals ==
=== Singles: 2 (0–2) ===
Legend ATP Challenger (0–2) ITF Futures (0–0)	Finals by surface Hard (0–2) Clay (0–0) Grass (0–0) Carpet (0–0)

Result	W–L	Date	Tournament	Tier	Surface	Opponent	Score
Loss	0–1	Apr 1989	Nagoya, Japan	Challenger	Hard	(India) Ramesh Krishnan	1–6, 3–6
Loss	0–2	Sep 1993	Singapore, Singapore	Challenger	Hard	(South Africa) Christo Van Rensburg	2–6, 7–5, 2–6

=== Doubles: 5 (3–2) ===
Legend ATP Challenger (3–2) ITF Futures (0–0)	Finals by surface Hard (3–2) Clay (0–0) Grass (0–0) Carpet (0–0)

Result	W–L	Date	Tournament	Tier	Surface	Partner	Opponents	Score
Loss	0–1	Apr 1989	Nagoya, Japan	Challenger	Hard	(India) Ramesh Krishnan	(United States) John Letts (United States) Bruce Man-Son-Hing	5–7, 6–4, 0–6
Loss	0–2	May 1990	Kuala Lumpur, Malaysia	Challenger	Hard	(New Zealand) Bruce Derlin	(Nigeria) Nduka Odizor (Kenya) Paul Wekesa	3–6, 4–6
Win	1–2	May 1990	Bangkok, Thailand	Challenger	Hard	(New Zealand) Bruce Derlin	(Australia) Neil Borwick (New Zealand) David Lewis	6–4, 6–4
Win	2–2	Dec 1991	Guam, United States	Challenger	Hard	(United States) Kenny Thorne	(South Africa) David Adams (United States) Doug Eisenman	6–1, 6–2
Win	3–2	Oct 1993	Réunion Island, France	Challenger	Hard	(United States) Jeff Tarango	(South Africa) Lan Bale (South Africa) Mark Kaplan	6–4, 3–6, 7–5

== Performance timelines ==
Key
W	F	SF	QF	#R	RR	Q#	DNQ	A	NH

(W) winner; (F) finalist; (SF) semifinalist; (QF) quarterfinalist; (#R) rounds 4, 3, 2, 1; (RR) round-robin stage; (Q#) qualification round; (DNQ) did not qualify; (A) absent; (NH) not held; (SR) strike rate (events won / competed); (W–L) win–loss record.

=== Singles ===
Tournament	1982	1983	1984	1985	1986	1987	1988	1989	1990	1991	1992	1993	1994	1995	SR	W–L	Win %
Grand Slam tournaments
Australian Open	Q3	A	A	1R	A	1R	A	Q2	A	1R	A	A	A	A	0 / 3	0–3	0%
French Open	A	A	A	A	2R	2R	A	A	A	A	A	A	A	A	0 / 2	2–2	50%
Wimbledon	Q2	Q1	Q1	1R	2R	1R	A	1R	Q1	Q1	A	A	1R	A	0 / 5	1–5	17%
US Open	A	1R	1R	2R	2R	2R	A	1R	A	A	A	A	Q2	A	0 / 6	3–6	33%
Win–loss	0–0	0–1	0–1	1–3	3–3	2–4	0–0	0–2	0–0	0–1	0–0	0–0	0–1	0–0	0 / 16	6–16	27%
ATP Masters Series
Indian Wells	A	A	A	A	A	2R	1R	2R	A	A	A	A	Q2	A	0 / 3	2–3	40%
Miami	A	A	A	3R	2R	1R	2R	3R	A	A	A	A	1R	Q3	0 / 6	6–6	50%
Rome	A	A	A	A	A	1R	A	A	A	A	A	A	A	A	0 / 1	0–1	0%
Canada	A	A	A	2R	SF	1R	A	3R	A	A	A	A	A	A	0 / 4	7–4	64%
Cincinnati	A	A	A	A	3R	3R	A	A	A	A	A	A	A	A	0 / 2	4–2	67%
Paris	A	A	A	A	A	A	A	A	A	A	A	Q1	A	A	0 / 0	0–0	–
Win–loss	0–0	0–0	0–0	3–2	7–3	3–5	1–2	5–3	0–0	0–0	0–0	0–0	0–1	0–0	0 / 16	19–16	54%

=== Doubles ===
Tournament	1983	1984	1985	1986	1987	1988	1989	1990	1991	1992	1993	1994	SR	W–L	Win %
Grand Slam tournaments
Australian Open	1R	A	3R	A	A	A	3R	A	1R	A	A	A	0 / 4	4–4	50%
French Open	A	2R	A	A	A	A	A	A	A	A	A	A	0 / 1	1–1	50%
Wimbledon	2R	1R	Q3	A	A	A	2R	3R	Q2	A	A	Q1	0 / 4	4–4	50%
US Open	A	A	A	A	A	A	3R	1R	A	A	A	A	0 / 2	2–2	50%
Win–loss	1–2	1–2	2–1	0–0	0–0	0–0	5–3	2–2	0–1	0–0	0–0	0–0	0 / 11	11–11	50%
ATP Masters Series
Miami	A	A	1R	A	A	A	2R	1R	2R	A	A	A	0 / 4	2–4	33%
Canada	A	A	A	A	A	A	QF	1R	A	A	A	A	0 / 2	2–2	50%
Cincinnati	A	A	A	A	A	A	A	1R	A	A	A	A	0 / 1	0–1	0%
Win–loss	0–0	0–0	0–1	0–0	0–0	0–0	3–2	0–3	1–1	0–0	0–0	0–0	0 / 7	4–7	36%
