= 1981 Benson and Hedges Open – Singles =

Singles
- 1981 Benson and Hedges Open

Final
- Champion: (United States) Bill Scanlon
- Runner-up: (United States) Tim Wilkison
- Score: 6–7, 6–3, 3–6, 7–6, 6–0

Details
- Draw: 32
- Seeds: 8

Events
Singles	Doubles
← 1980 ·	ATP Auckland Open	· 1982 →

First-seeded Bill Scanlon defeated Tim Wilkison 6–7, 6–3, 3–6, 7–6, 6–0 to win the 1981 Benson and Hedges Open singles competition. John Sadri was the champion but did not defend his title.

== Seeds ==
A champion seed is indicated in bold text while text in italics indicates the round in which that seed was eliminated.

1. (United States) Bill Scanlon **(champion)**
2. (Australia) Rod Frawley (first round)
3. (New Zealand) Russell Simpson (quarterfinals)
4. (United States) Ferdi Taygan (quarterfinals)
5. (United States) Tim Wilkison (final)
6. (New Zealand) Onny Parun (semifinals)
7. (United States) Billy Martin (semifinals)
8. (United States) Chris Mayotte (quarterfinals)

== Draw ==
=== Key ===
- Q = Qualifier
- WC = Wild card
- LL = Lucky loser
- Alt = Alternate
- SE = Special exempt
- PR = Protected ranking
- ITF = ITF entry
- JE = Junior exempt
- w/o = Walkover
- r = Retired
- d = Defaulted
- SR = Special ranking
- NB: The Final was the best of 5 sets while all other rounds were the best of 3 sets.

=== Final ===
Final
1	(United States) **Bill Scanlon**	6	**6**	3	**7**	**6**
5	(United States) Tim Wilkison	**7**	3	**6**	6	0

=== Section 1 ===
First round
1	(United States) **B Scanlon**	5	**6**	**7**
(Australia) S Docherty	**7**	3	5
(United States) **M Estep**	**6**	**6**
(United States) G Petrovic	2	3
(Australia) **D Crealy**	**6**	**7**
(United States) C Stansbury	4	6
(United States) L Bourne	5	1
8	(United States) **C Mayotte**	**7**	**6**
3	(New Zealand) **R Simpson**	**6**	**6**
(United States) D Siegler	4	3
Q	(United States) **J Lapidus**	4	**6**	**6**
(Australia) D Carter	**6**	2	4
(United States) **T Graham**	**6**	**6**
(New Zealand) B Derlin	1	4
(Australia) G Whitecross	2	**6**	2
6	(New Zealand) **O Parun**	**6**	3	**6**

Second round
1	(United States) **B Scanlon**	**6**	**6**
(United States) M Estep	0	3
(Australia) D Crealy	3	6
8	(United States) **C Mayotte**	**6**	**7**
3	(New Zealand) **R Simpson**	5	**7**	**6**
Q	(United States) J Lapidus	**7**	6	4
(United States) T Graham	4	3
6	(New Zealand) **O Parun**	**6**	**6**

Quarterfinals
1	(United States) **B Scanlon**	**7**	**6**
8	(United States) C Mayotte	6	1
3	(New Zealand) R Simpson	4	**7**	8
6	(New Zealand) **O Parun**	**6**	6	**10**

Semifinals
1	(United States) **B Scanlon**	**6**	**7**
6	(New Zealand) O Parun	4	6

=== Section 2 ===
First round
5	(United States) **T Wilkison**	2	**6**	**6**
(United States) S McCain	**6**	1	2
(United States) **L Stefanki**	**6**	**4**
(United States) T Cain	2	0	R
(New Zealand) **M Lewis**	**6**	**6**
(Australia) E Ewert	2	4
(United States) P Campbell	2	2
4	(United States) **F Taygan**	**6**	**6**
7	(United States) **B Martin**	**6**	**6**
(Australia) A Gardiner	4	4
(United States) **B Maze**	**6**	**6**
(Australia) B Gilmour	4	4
Q	(United States) **R Hightower**	**6**	**6**
Q	(New Zealand) D Mustard	3	1
Q	(New Zealand) **J Simpson**	**6**	**6**
2	(Australia) R Frawley	3	4

Second round
5	(United States) **T Wilkison**	**7**	**6**
(United States) L Stefanki	5	3
(New Zealand) M Lewis	0	2
4	(United States) **F Taygan**	**6**	**6**
7	(United States) **B Martin**	**7**	**6**
(United States) B Maze	5	3
Q	(United States) **R Hightower**	**6**	2	**9**
Q	(New Zealand) J Simpson	4	**6**	7

Quarterfinals
5	(United States) **T Wilkison**	3	**6**	**6**
4	(United States) F Taygan	**6**	4	3
7	(United States) **B Martin**	3	**7**	**7**
Q	(United States) R Hightower	**6**	6	5

Semifinals
5	(United States) **T Wilkison**	**6**	**7**
7	(United States) B Martin	1	5
