= 1981 Benson and Hedges Open =

Tennis tournament

- Date: 5–11 January
- Edition: 14th
- Category: Grand Prix
- Draw: 32S / 16D
- Prize money: $50,000
- Surface: Hard / outdoor
- Location: Auckland, New Zealand
- Venue: Stanley Street Tennis Stadium

Champions

Singles
- (United States) Bill Scanlon

Doubles
- (United States) Ferdi Taygan / (United States) Tim Wilkison
← 1980 ·	ATP Auckland Open	· 1982 →

The 1981 Benson and Hedges Open was a men's professional tennis tournament held at the Stanley Street Tennis Stadium in Auckland, New Zealand, which was part of the 1981 Grand Prix circuit. It was the 14th edition of the tournament and was held from 5 January through 11 January 1981. First-seeded Bill Scanlon won the singles title.

== Finals ==
=== Singles ===
(United States) Bill Scanlon defeated (United States) Tim Wilkison 6–7, 6–3, 3–6, 7–6, 6–0

- It was Scanlon's 1st title of the year and the 4th of his career.

=== Doubles ===
(United States) Ferdi Taygan / (United States) Tim Wilkison defeated (United States) Tony Graham / (United States) Bill Scanlon 7–5, 6–1

- It was Taygan's 1st title of the year and the 5th of his career. It was Wilkison's 1st title of the year and the 4th of his career.
