= Nancy Neviaser =

American tennis player

- Full name: Nancy Neviaser Baker
- Country (sports): United States
- Born: April 18, 1958 (age 66); Fairfax, Virginia, US
- Height: 5 ft 5.5 in (1.66 m)
- Plays: Left-handed

Singles

Grand Slam singles results
- French Open: 1R (1982)
- Wimbledon: Q3 (1982)
- US Open: 1R (1982)

Doubles

Grand Slam doubles results
- French Open: 2R (1982)
- Wimbledon: 1R (1982)
- US Open: 1R (1982)

Nancy Neviaser Baker (born April 18, 1958) is an American former professional tennis player.

Neviaser, raised in Fairfax, Virginia, played collegiate tennis while at Rollins College, earning AIAW All-American honors in 1979 and 1980. She made appearances on the professional tour during the 1980s, which included the singles main draws of the 1982 French and US Opens. Her best win in a WTA Tour tournament came at the 1982 Edgbaston Cup, where she upset 13th seed Sharon Walsh in the first round.
