= Joni Van Ryck De Groot =

Jamaican tennis player

- Country (sports): Jamaica
- Born: October 17, 1955 (age 70)

Singles

Grand Slam singles results
- Wimbledon: Q2 (1982)
- US Open: Q1 (1982)

Team competitions
- Fed Cup: 7–34

Joni Van Ryck De Groot (born 17 October 1955) is a Jamaican former professional tennis player.

Playing for Jamaica at the Fed Cup, Van Ryck De Groot has accumulated a win–loss record of 7–34.

== Career finals ==
=== Doubles: 2 (2–0) ===
| Result | No. | Year | Tournament | Surface | Partner | Opponents | Score |
|---|---|---|---|---|---|---|---|
| Win | 1. | April 1982 | Monterrey, Mexico | Clay | (United States) Lele Forood | (United States) Trey Lewis (United States) Cherise Hagey | 6–4, 5–7, 7–6 |
| Win | 2. | April 1982 | San Luis Potosí, Mexico | Clay | (Mexico) Teresa Lisci | (Mexico) Liza Riefkohl (Mexico) Claudia Hernández | 6–2, 7–6 |
