= Dick Metz (tennis) =

American tennis player

- Country (sports): United States

Singles
- Career record: 0–1
- Highest ranking: No. 548 (Jan 3, 1983)

Grand Slam singles results
- Wimbledon: Q3 (1982)

Doubles
- Career record: 0–1
- Highest ranking: No. 480 (Jan 3 1983)

Grand Slam doubles results
- Wimbledon: Q2 (1982)
Medal record
Universiade
| Silver medal – second place | 1979 Mexico City | Men's doubles |

Dick Metz is an American former professional tennis player.

Metz, a native of California, played his junior and senior collegiate seasons at the UCLA Bruins, where he was a member of the 1979 NCAA championship team. Metzwas a doubles silver medalist at the World University Games, where Metz earned All-American honors for the Bruins in 1980. His time at UCLA included a win over future ATP top 10 player Tim Mayotte.

In 1982 he featured in the singles main draw of the Benson and Hedges Open in Auckland and made the final singles qualifying round of the Wimbledon Championships.

Metz was later the tour coach of WTA Tour player Patty Fendick.
