= 1982 Wimbledon Championships – Girls' singles =

Girls' singles
- 1982 Wimbledon Championships

Final
- Champion: (France) Catherine Tanvier
- Runner-up: (Czechoslovakia) Helena Suková
- Score: 6–2, 7–5

Events
Singles	men	women		boys	girls
Doubles	men	women	mixed	boys	girls
WC Singles	men	women	quad
WC Doubles	men	women	quad
Legends	men	women	seniors
← 1981 ·	Wimbledon Championships	· 1983 →

Catherine Tanvier defeated Helena Suková in the final, 6–2, 7–5 to win the girls' singles tennis title at the 1982 Wimbledon Championships.

== Seeds ==
1. (Czechoslovakia) Helena Suková (final)
2. (France) Catherine Tanvier (champion)
3. (United States) Barbara Gerken (quarterfinals)
4. (Bulgaria) Manuela Maleeva (second round)
5. (United States) Gretchen Rush (third round)
6. (United States) Beth Herr (second round)
7. (United Kingdom) Elizabeth Jones (quarterfinals)
8. (Canada) Carling Bassett (quarterfinals)

Click on the seed number of a player to go to their draw section.

== Draw ==
=== Key ===
- Q = Qualifier
- WC = Wild card
- LL = Lucky loser
- Alt = Alternate
- SE = Special exempt
- PR = Protected ranking
- ITF = ITF entry
- JE = Junior exempt
- w/o = Walkover
- r = Retired
- d = Defaulted
- SR = Special ranking

=== Finals ===
Quarterfinals
1	(Czechoslovakia) Helena Suková	1	6	6
8	(Canada) Carling Bassett	6	2	2
(Australia) Bernadette Randall	6	1	4
(Sweden) Helena Olsson	0	6	6
(United Kingdom) Sara Gomer	6	6^{7}	7
3	(United States) Barbara Gerken	3	7^{9}	5
7	(United Kingdom) Elizabeth Jones	0	2
2	(France) Catherine Tanvier	6	6

Semifinals
1	(Czechoslovakia) Helena Suková	6	6
(Sweden) Helena Olsson	3	2
(United Kingdom) Sara Gomer	0	3
2	(France) Catherine Tanvier	6	6

Final
1	(Czechoslovakia) Helena Suková	2	5
2	(France) Catherine Tanvier	6	7

=== Top half ===
==== Section 1 ====
First round
1	(Czechoslovakia) Helena Suková	6	6
(Mexico) Claudia Hernández	2	3
(Brazil) Silvana Campos	1	2
(Japan) Emiko Okagawa	6	6
(South Africa) Rosalind Riach	6	6
(United Kingdom) Catherine Berry	4	4
(United Kingdom) Shelley Walpole	6	6
(Malaysia) Gabrielle Eu	2	0

Second round
1	(Czechoslovakia) H Suková	6	6
(France) Pascale Paradis	0	1
(Philippines) Dyan Castillejo	0	2
(Japan) E Okagawa	6	6
(South Africa) R Riach	6	6
(Socialist Federal Republic of Yugoslavia) Sabrina Goleš	4	4
(United Kingdom) S Walpole	6	3
8	(Canada) Carling Bassett	7	6

Third round
1	(Czechoslovakia) H Suková	6	6
(Japan) E Okagawa	2	0
(South Africa) R Riach	6	3
8	(Canada) C Bassett	7	6

Quarterfinals
1	(Czechoslovakia) H Suková	1	6	6
8	(Canada) C Bassett	6	2	2

==== Section 2 ====
First round
(Switzerland) Monica Weber	5	1
(Australia) Bernadette Randall	7	6
(United States) Penny Barg	6	6
(Australia) Sharon Hodgkin	0	2
(Japan) Akiko Kijimuta	3	4
(Netherlands) Yvette Flu	6	6
(Sweden) Helena Olsson	1	7	6
(Czechoslovakia) Hana Fukárková	6	6	2

Second round
4	(Bulgaria) Manuela Maleeva	6	3	2
(Australia) B Randall	3	6	6
(United States) P Barg	6	6
(India) Namratha Appa Rao	2	0
(United Kingdom) Jo Louis	6	4
(Netherlands) Y Flu	7	6
(Sweden) H Olsson	6	6
6	(United States) Beth Herr	4	2

Third round
(Australia) B Randall	6	4	6
(United States) P Barg	3	6	2
(Netherlands) Y Flu	6	0	3
(Sweden) H Olsson	4	6	6

Quarterfinals
(Australia) B Randall	6	1	4
(Sweden) H Olsson	0	6	6

=== Bottom half ===
==== Section 3 ====
First round
5	(United States) Gretchen Rush	6	6
(Switzerland) Eva Krapl	2	1
(Zimbabwe) Fiona Martin	1	6
(Denmark) Tine Scheuer-Larsen	6	7
(United Kingdom) Julie Salmon	6	6
(Switzerland) Susanne Schmid	4	3
(Israel) Ruth Sverdloff	5	2
(Mexico) Heliane Steden	7	6

Second round
5	(United States) G Rush	7	6
(Socialist Federal Republic of Yugoslavia) Renata Šašak	5	1
(Denmark) T Scheuer-Larsen	4	4
(United Kingdom) Sara Gomer	6	6
(Hong Kong) Patricia Hy	6	2
(United Kingdom) J Salmon	7	6
(Mexico) H Steden	0	2
3	(United States) Barbara Gerken	6	6

Third round
5	(United States) G Rush	6	3	5
(United Kingdom) S Gomer	4	6	7
(United Kingdom) J Salmon	4	2
3	(United States) B Gerken	6	6

Quarterfinals
(United Kingdom) S Gomer	6	6^{7}	7
3	(United States) B Gerken	3	7^{9}	5

==== Section 4 ====
First round
(New Zealand) Belinda Cordwell	6	6
(Belgium) Martine Geypen	3	0
(West Germany) Myriam Schropp	4	2
(Austria) Petra Huber	6	6
(Trinidad and Tobago) Judy Flook	1	0
(United Kingdom) Amanda Brown	6	6
(Japan) Etsuko Inoue	3	2
2	(France) Catherine Tanvier	6	6

Second round
7	(United Kingdom) Elizabeth Jones	7	6
(New Zealand) B Cordwell	6	1
(Japan) Kumiko Okamoto	1	3
(Austria) P Huber	6	6
(United Kingdom) A Brown	6	6	0
(South Africa) Elvyn Barrable	2	7	6
(Australia) Elizabeth Minter	6	2	3
2	(France) C Tanvier	3	6	6

Third round
7	(United Kingdom) E Jones	6	0	8
(Austria) P Huber	3	6	6
(South Africa) E Barrable	2	6	2
2	(France) C Tanvier	6	4	6

Quarterfinals
7	(United Kingdom) E Jones	0	2
2	(France) C Tanvier	6	6
