= Brent Pirow =

South African tennis player

- Country (sports): South Africa
- Born: 6 February 1959 (age 66)

Singles
- Career record: 2–9
- Highest ranking: No. 229 (3 January 1983)

Grand Slam singles results
- French Open: 2R (1983)
- Wimbledon: 1R (1982)

Doubles
- Career record: 4–14
- Highest ranking: No. 254 (3 January 1983)

Grand Slam doubles results
- US Open: 1R (1983)

Grand Slam mixed doubles results
- US Open: 2R (1983)

Brent Pirow (born 6 February 1959) is a South African former professional tennis player.

Pirow twice qualified for the singles main draw of a grand slam tournament. At the 1982 Wimbledon Championships, which he made as a lucky loser, he lost in the first round to third seed Vitas Gerulaitis. His other appearance came at the 1983 French Open, where after winning his way through qualifying he won his first round match against Gilles Moretton, in five sets. He was beaten in the second round by Patrice Kuchna in another five setter.

== Challenger titles ==
=== Singles: (1) ===
Year	Tournament	Surface	Opponent	Score
1982	Lee-on-Solent, Great Britain	Clay	(South Africa) Derek Tarr	6–7, 6–4, 6–1
