= Adam Scheinman =

American tennis player and screenwriter

- Country (sports): United States

Singles
- Highest ranking: No. 743 (Jan 3, 1983)

Grand Slam singles results
- Wimbledon: Q1 (1982)

Doubles
- Career record: 2–14
- Highest ranking: No. 337 (Jan 2, 1984)

Grand Slam doubles results
- Wimbledon: 1R (1982)

Adam Scheinman is an American screenwriter and former professional tennis player.

Scheinman studied at the University of Virginia, where he was a member of the varsity tennis team, before competing on the professional tour during the 1980s. He featured in the men's doubles main draw of the 1982 Wimbledon Championships. As a screenwriter his credits include the film Mickey Blue Eyes, starring Hugh Grant. His brother Andrew, who was also a tennis player, is a film and television producer.
