= Tennis at the 1979 Summer Universiade =

Tennis events were contested at the 1979 Summer Universiade in Mexico City, Mexico.

== Medal summary ==
| Event | Gold | Silver | Bronze |
|---|---|---|---|
| Men's singles | Vadim Borisov (URS) | Nandan Bal (IND) | Andrei Dîrzu (ROU) |
| Men's doubles | Ramiz Akhmerov and Vadim Borisov (URS) | Dick Metz and Blaine Willenborg (USA) | Andrei Dîrzu and Florin Segărceanu (ROU) |
| Women's singles | Natasha Chmyreva (URS) | Eugenia Birioukova (URS) | Virginia Ruzici (ROU) |
| Women's doubles | Florența Mihai and Virginia Ruzici (ROU) | Ham Yun-Ja and Kim Su-Ok (KOR) | Eugenia Birioukova and Natasha Chmyreva (URS) |
| Mixed doubles | Virginia Ruzici and Traian Marcu (ROU) | Eugenia Birioukova and Ramiz Akhmerov (URS) | Hélène Pelletier and Nick Mohtadi (CAN) |

== Medal table ==
| Rank | Nation | Gold | Silver | Bronze | Total |
|---|---|---|---|---|---|
| 1 | Soviet Union (URS) | 3 | 2 | 1 | 6 |
| 2 | Romania (ROU) | 2 | 0 | 3 | 5 |
| 3 | India (IND) | 0 | 1 | 0 | 1 |
| 3 | South Korea (KOR) | 0 | 1 | 0 | 1 |
| 3 | United States (USA) | 0 | 1 | 0 | 1 |
| 6 | Canada (CAN) | 0 | 0 | 1 | 1 |
| Totals (6 entries) | | 5 | 5 | 5 | 15 |

== See also ==
- Tennis at the Summer Universiade
