= 1982 Wimbledon Championships – Girls' doubles =

Girls' doubles
- 1982 Wimbledon Championships

Final
- Champions: (United States) Penny Barg (United States) Beth Herr
- Runners-up: (United States) Barbara Gerken (United States) Gretchen Rush
- Score: 6–1, 6–4

Events
Singles	men	women		boys	girls
Doubles	men	women	mixed	boys	girls
WC Singles	men	women	quad
WC Doubles	men	women	quad
Legends	men	women	seniors
Wimbledon Championships	· 1983 →

Beth Herr and Penny Barg defeated Barbara Gerken and Gretchen Rush in the final, 6–1, 6–4 to win the inaugural Girls' Doubles tennis title at the 1982 Wimbledon Championships.

== Seeds ==
1. (Australia) Elizabeth Minter / (Australia) Bernadette Randall (semifinals)
2. (United States) Penny Barg / (United States) Beth Herr (champions)
3. (United States) Barbara Gerken / (United States) Gretchen Rush (final)
4. (Japan) Etsuko Inoue / (Japan) Emiko Okagawa (quarterfinals)

== Draw ==
=== Key ===
- Q = Qualifier
- WC = Wild card
- LL = Lucky loser
- Alt = Alternate
- SE = Special exempt
- PR = Protected ranking
- ITF = ITF entry
- JE = Junior exempt
- w/o = Walkover
- r = Retired
- d = Defaulted
- SR = Special ranking

=== Draw ===
First round
1	(Australia) Elizabeth Minter (Australia) Bernadette Randall	6	1
(Sweden) Helena Olsson (Denmark) Tine Scheuer-Larsen	3	1^{r}
(United Kingdom) Catherine Berry (United Kingdom) Amanda Brown	w/o
(Netherlands) Yvette Flu (Bulgaria) Manuela Maleeva
(New Zealand) Belinda Cordwell (Switzerland) Monica Weber
(United Kingdom) Elizabeth Jones (United Kingdom) Shelley Walpole	w/o
(Japan) Akiko Kijimuta (Japan) Kumiko Okamoto	0	2
3	(United States) Barbara Gerken (United States) Gretchen Rush	6	6
4	(Japan) Etsuko Inoue (Japan) Emiko Okagawa
(Australia) Sharon Hodgkin (Israel) Ruth Sverdloff	w/o
(Socialist Federal Republic of Yugoslavia) Sabrina Goleš (Socialist Federal Republic of Yugoslavia) Renata Šašak	w/o
(Czechoslovakia) Hana Fukárková (Czechoslovakia) Helena Suková
(United Kingdom) Sara Gomer (United Kingdom) Julie Salmon
(South Africa) Elvyn Barrable (South Africa) Rosalind Riach	w/o
(Switzerland) Eva Krapl (Switzerland) Susanne Schmid	w/o
2	(United States) Penny Barg (United States) Beth Herr

Quarterfinals
1	(Australia) Elizabeth Minter (Australia) Bernadette Randall
(Netherlands) Yvette Flu (Bulgaria) Manuela Maleeva	w/o
(New Zealand) Belinda Cordwell (Switzerland) Monica Weber	4	4
3	(United States) Barbara Gerken (United States) Gretchen Rush	6	6
4	(Japan) Etsuko Inoue (Japan) Emiko Okagawa	2	3
(Czechoslovakia) Hana Fukárková (Czechoslovakia) Helena Suková	6	6
(United Kingdom) Sara Gomer (United Kingdom) Julie Salmon	w/o
2	(United States) Penny Barg (United States) Beth Herr

Semifinals
1	(Australia) Elizabeth Minter (Australia) Bernadette Randall	2	6	3
3	(United States) Barbara Gerken (United States) Gretchen Rush	6	1	6
(Czechoslovakia) Hana Fukárková (Czechoslovakia) Helena Suková	6	6	3
2	(United States) Penny Barg (United States) Beth Herr	7	2	6

Final
3	(United States) Barbara Gerken (United States) Gretchen Rush	1	4
2	(United States) Penny Barg (United States) Beth Herr	6	6
