= Peter Smylie =

Australian tennis player

- Country (sports): Australia
- Born: 11 October 1958 (age 66); Sydney, Australia

Doubles

Grand Slam doubles results
- Australian Open: 1R (1978)
- Wimbledon: 1R (1982)

Grand Slam mixed doubles results
- French Open: 2R (1983)

Peter Smylie (born 11 October 1958) is an Australian former professional tennis player.

== Biography ==
Born in Sydney, Smylie began playing on the circuit in the late 1970s and featured in three grand slam main draws during his career, all as a doubles player. He competed in the men's doubles at the 1978 Australian Open and 1982 Wimbledon Championships, then the mixed doubles at the 1983 French Open.

His mixed doubles partner at the 1983 French Open was Liz Sayers, who he gave up tennis to coach. They got married in 1984.

Smylie lives on the Gold Coast and works as a real estate sales executive, following a career in sports management. He has three children with wife Liz.
