= Nick Mohtadi =

Canadian orthopaedic surgeon and tennis player

- Full name: Nicholas Mohtadi
- Country (sports): Canada
- Born: Birmingham, England, UK

Singles
- Career record: 0–1
- Highest ranking: No. 576 (Jan 3, 1983)

Grand Slam singles results
- Wimbledon: Q1 (1982)

Doubles
- Career record: 0–1
- Highest ranking: No. 610 (Jan 3, 1983)

Grand Slam doubles results
- Wimbledon: 1R (1982)
Medal record
Universiade
Bronze medal – third place	1979 Mexico City	Mixed doubles

Nicholas Mohtadi is a Canadian orthopaedic surgeon and former professional tennis player.

Mohtadi was born in England and is of Iranian descent. His father, Matthew Farhang Mohtadi, was an Iranian-Canadian academic and Olympic basketball player. The family settled in Calgary, Alberta in 1967.

A national junior champion, Mohtadi went to Oklahoma City University on a tennis scholarship and finished his education back in Canada at the University of Calgary, graduating in 1981 with a Doctor of Medicine.

Mohtadi competed briefly in professional tennis and qualified for the men's doubles main draw at Wimbledon in 1982.
