= John Whiteford =

British tennis player

- Country (sports): Great Britain
- Born: 22 January 1957 (age 68); Sussex, England
- Plays: Left-handed

Singles
- Career record: 0–1
- Highest ranking: No. 344 (4 Jan 1981)

Grand Slam singles results
- Wimbledon: Q3 (1983, 1985)

Doubles
- Career record: 2–7

Grand Slam doubles results
- Wimbledon: 2R (1980, 1982)

Grand Slam mixed doubles results
- Wimbledon: 1R (1979)

John Whiteford (born 22 January 1957) is a British former professional tennis player.

A left-handed player from Sussex, Whiteford featured in several editions of the Wimbledon Championships, including main draw appearances in doubles. In 1981 he was one of three British players arrested on arrival in Nigeria to compete in the Lagos Open, due to their prior participation at tournaments in apartheid South Africa. The incident resulted in the Lagos event being excluded from the Grand Prix calendar for a year.

Whiteford, who played a season of U.S. collegiate tennis for Rice University in 1976, has served as the head coach at the University of Bath and has coached Britain at the World University Games.
