= 1982 Wimbledon Championships – Women's doubles =

Women's doubles
- 1982 Wimbledon Championships

Final
- Champions: (United States) Martina Navratilova (United States) Pam Shriver
- Runners-up: (United States) Kathy Jordan (United States) Anne Smith
- Score: 6–4, 6–1

Details
- Draw: 48 (4 Q )
- Seeds: 12

Events
| Singles | men | women | | boys | girls |
| Doubles | men | women | mixed | boys | girls |
| WC Singles | men | women | quad |
| WC Doubles | men | women | quad |
| Legends | men | women | seniors |
| ← 1981 · | Wimbledon Championships | · 1983 → |

Martina Navratilova and Pam Shriver successfully defended their title, defeating Kathy Jordan and Anne Smith in the final, 6–4, 6–1 to win the ladies' doubles tennis title at the 1982 Wimbledon Championships.

== Seeds ==
1. (United States) Martina Navratilova / (United States) Pam Shriver (champions)
2. (United States) Kathy Jordan / (United States) Anne Smith (final)
3. (United States) Rosie Casals / (Australia) Wendy Turnbull (semifinals)
4. (United States) Barbara Potter / (United States) Sharon Walsh (second round)
5. (United Kingdom) Sue Barker / (United States) Ann Kiyomura (second round)
6. (United States) JoAnne Russell / (Romania) Virginia Ruzici (quarterfinals)
7. (United States) Leslie Allen / (Socialist Federal Republic of Yugoslavia) Mima Jaušovec (third round)
8. (United States) Candy Reynolds / (United States) Paula Smith (third round)
9. (United States) Billie Jean King / (South Africa) Ilana Kloss (second round)
10. (South Africa) Rosalyn Fairbank / (South Africa) Tanya Harford (second round)
11. (United States) Andrea Jaeger / (United States) Betsy Nagelsen (second round)
12. (United States) Mary-Lou Piatek / (United States) Wendy White (third round)

Click on the seed number of a player to go to their draw section.

== Draw ==
=== Key ===
- Q = Qualifier
- WC = Wild card
- LL = Lucky loser
- Alt = Alternate
- SE = Special exempt
- PR = Protected ranking
- ITF = ITF entry
- JE = Junior exempt
- w/o = Walkover
- r = Retired
- d = Defaulted
- SR = Special ranking

=== Finals ===
Quarterfinals
1 | (United States) Martina Navratilova (United States) Pam Shriver | 6 | 6
(Brazil) Patricia Medrado (Brazil) Cláudia Monteiro | 3 | 2
(Canada) Marjorie Blackwood (Australia) Susan Leo | 6 | 5
(West Germany) Bettina Bunge (West Germany) Claudia Kohde | 7 | 7
6 | (United States) JoAnne Russell (Romania) Virginia Ruzici | 1 | 4
3 | (United States) Rosie Casals (Australia) Wendy Turnbull | 6 | 6
Q | (United States) Elise Burgin (United States) Alycia Moulton | 7 | 6 | 5
2 | (United States) Kathy Jordan (United States) Anne Smith | 6 | 7 | 7

Semifinals
1 | (United States) Martina Navratilova (United States) Pam Shriver | 6 | 6
(West Germany) Bettina Bunge (West Germany) Claudia Kohde | 3 | 4
3 | (United States) Rosie Casals (Australia) Wendy Turnbull | 2 | 6 | 4
2 | (United States) Kathy Jordan (United States) Anne Smith | 6 | 2 | 6

Final
1 | (United States) Martina Navratilova (United States) Pam Shriver | 6 | 6
2 | (United States) Kathy Jordan (United States) Anne Smith | 4 | 1

=== Top half ===
==== Section 1 ====
First round
(Netherlands) M Mesker (United States) P Teeguarden | 6 | 3 | 2
(United Kingdom) J Durie (United Kingdom) A Hobbs | 1 | 6 | 6
(United States) C Evert Lloyd (United States) K Rinaldi | 6 | 6
(United States) K Sands (Italy) S Simmonds | 0 | 1
(Brazil) P Medrado (Brazil) C Monteiro | 7 | 7
(Australia) C O'Neil (Sweden) M Wikstedt | 6 | 5
(United States) L Forood (United States) T Holladay | 4 | 4
(United Kingdom) D Jevans (United Kingdom) E Jones | 6 | 6

Second round
1 | (United States) M Navratilova (United States) P Shriver | 6 | 6 | 6
(United Kingdom) J Durie (United Kingdom) A Hobbs | 4 | 7 | 3
(United States) A Leand (Hungary) A Temesvári | 6 | 6 | 2
(United States) C Evert Lloyd (United States) K Rinaldi | 4 | 7 | 6
9 | (United States) BJ King (South Africa) I Kloss | 6 | 6 | 5
(Brazil) P Medrado (Brazil) C Monteiro | 7 | 3 | 7
(United Kingdom) D Jevans (United Kingdom) E Jones | 2 | 1
8 | (United States) C Reynolds (United States) P Smith | 6 | 6

Third round
1 | (United States) M Navratilova (United States) P Shriver | 7 | 6
(United States) C Evert Lloyd (United States) K Rinaldi | 5 | 1
(Brazil) P Medrado (Brazil) C Monteiro | 6 | 7
8 | (United States) C Reynolds (United States) P Smith | 1 | 5

Quarterfinals
1 | (United States) M Navratilova (United States) P Shriver | 6 | 6
(Brazil) P Medrado (Brazil) C Monteiro | 3 | 2

==== Section 2 ====
First round
(Australia) E Sayers (Australia) A Tobin | 3 | 4
(United States) K Jones (United States) E Norton | 6 | 6
(United States) D Desfor (United States) B Hallquist | 6 | 5 | 8
(United Kingdom) G Coles (United States) T Lewis | 2 | 7 | 6
(West Germany) B Bunge (West Germany) C Kohde | w/o
(Switzerland) P Delhees (Switzerland) C Jolissaint
(West Germany) E Pfaff (Czechoslovakia) H Suková | 6 | 7
Q | (South Africa) J Mundel (South Africa) S Rollinson | 0 | 5

Second round
4 | (United States) B Potter (United States) S Walsh | 6 | 5 | 0^{r}
(United States) K Jones (United States) E Norton | 1 | 7 | 0
(Canada) M Blackwood (Australia) S Leo | 3 | 7 | 9
(United States) D Desfor (United States) B Hallquist | 6 | 6 | 7
5 | (United Kingdom) S Barker (United States) A Kiyomura | 3 | 6 | 4
(West Germany) B Bunge (West Germany) C Kohde | 6 | 3 | 6
(West Germany) E Pfaff (Czechoslovakia) H Suková | 6 | 2
12 | (United States) M-L Piatek (United States) W White | 7 | 6

Third round
(United States) K Jones (United States) E Norton | 2 | 4
(Canada) M Blackwood (Australia) S Leo | 6 | 6
(West Germany) B Bunge (West Germany) C Kohde | 7 | 6
12 | (United States) M-L Piatek (United States) W White | 6 | 2

Quarterfinals
(Canada) M Blackwood (Australia) S Leo | 6 | 5
(West Germany) B Bunge (West Germany) C Kohde | 7 | 7

=== Bottom half ===
==== Section 3 ====
First round
(South Africa) Y Vermaak (United States) N Yeargin | 6 | 6
(United States) V Nelson (United States) N Neviaser | 1 | 4
(Hungary) M Pinterová (Japan) N Sato | 6 | 2 | 6
(United States) L Bonder (United States) Z Garrison | 3 | 6 | 3
(New Zealand) C Newton (Australia) B Remilton | 2 | 4
(United States) K Horvath (United Kingdom) V Wade | 6 | 6
LL | (United States) A Henricksson (Australia) P Whytcross | 4 | 6 | 4
(South Korea) D-h Lee (Czechoslovakia) R Tomanová | 6 | 3 | 6

Second round
11 | (United States) A Jaeger (United States) E Nagelsen | 6 | 6 | 10
(South Africa) Y Vermaak (United States) N Yeargin | 7 | 2 | 12
(Hungary) M Pinterová (Japan) N Sato | 1 | 4
6 | (United States) J Russell (Romania) V Ruzici | 6 | 6
(United States) K Horvath (United Kingdom) V Wade | 6 | 4 | 6
(United States) K Latham (France) C Tanvier | 2 | 6 | 3
(South Korea) D-h Lee (Czechoslovakia) R Tomanová | 4 | 1
3 | (United States) R Casals (Australia) W Turnbull | 6 | 6

Third round
(South Africa) Y Vermaak (United States) N Yeargin | 3 | 6
6 | (United States) J Russell (Romania) V Ruzici | 6 | 7
(United States) K Horvath (United Kingdom) V Wade | 1 | 2
3 | (United States) R Casals (Australia) W Turnbull | 6 | 6

Quarterfinals
6 | (United States) J Russell (Romania) V Ruzici | 1 | 4
3 | (United States) R Casals (Australia) W Turnbull | 6 | 6

==== Section 4 ====
First round
(United States) M Louie (United States) S Margolin
(United States) L duPont (United States) B Jordan | w/o
Q | (Australia) N Gregory (United States) K Steinmetz | 3 | 5
Q | (United States) E Burgin (United States) A Moulton | 6 | 7
(United States) S Mascarin (United States) A White | 2 | 2
(Czechoslovakia) H Mandlíková (Netherlands) B Stöve | 6 | 6
Q | (South Africa) E Gordon (South Africa) B Mould | 6 | 3 | 6
(United Kingdom) S Gomer (United Kingdom) J Salmon | 4 | 6 | 4

Second round
7 | (United States) L Allen (Socialist Federal Republic of Yugoslavia) M Jaušovec | 6 | 6
(United States) L duPont (United States) B Jordan | 3 | 4
Q | (United States) E Burgin (United States) A Moulton | 6 | 2
10 | (South Africa) R Fairbank (South Africa) T Harford | 3 | 1^{r}
(Czechoslovakia) H Mandlíková (Netherlands) B Stöve | 4 | 2
(United States) S Collins (United States) B Lemberg | 6 | 6
Q | (South Africa) E Gordon (South Africa) B Mould
2 | (United States) K Jordan (United States) A Smith | w/o

Third round
7 | (United States) L Allen (Socialist Federal Republic of Yugoslavia) M Jaušovec | 6 | 4 | 2
Q | (United States) E Burgin (United States) A Moulton | 1 | 6 | 6
(United States) S Collins (United States) B Lemberg | 3 | 3
2 | (United States) K Jordan (United States) A Smith | 6 | 6

Quarterfinals
Q | (United States) E Burgin (United States) A Moulton | 7 | 6 | 5
2 | (United States) K Jordan (United States) A Smith | 6 | 7 | 7
