= Elizabeth Jones (tennis) =

British tennis player

Liz Jones
- Full name: Elizabeth Jones
- Country (sports): United Kingdom
- Born: 29 March 1964 (age 62)
- Plays: Right-handed
- Prize money: $20,216

Singles
- Career record: 5–5

Grand Slam singles results
- French Open: 1R (1982)
- Wimbledon: 1R (1982)
- US Open: 1R (1982)

Doubles
- Career record: 1–3

Grand Slam doubles results
- Wimbledon: 2R (1982)
- US Open: 1R (1982)
Medal record
Representing Great Britain
Women's Tennis
Summer Universiade
Silver medal – second place	1985 Kobe	Women's Doubles

Elizabeth Jones (born 29 March 1964) is a British former professional tennis player.

== Biography ==
A right-handed player, Jones is originally from Southampton and was one of the world's top juniors. She made the 1982 French Open junior semi-finals and was a junior quarter-finalist at Wimbledon in the same year.

On the professional tour, Jones had her breakthrough in 1981 when as a 17-year old she had a first round win over Rosalyn Fairbank in Brighton, then took former French Open champion Mima Jaušovec to three sets in her next match.

In 1982, while still competing in junior events, she played in the main draws of the French Open, Wimbledon and US Open.

Jones and her coaching partner Mandy Franks were the joint winners of the LTA Coach of the Year award for 2001.
