= 1982 Wimbledon Championships – Men's singles =

Men's singles
- 1982 Wimbledon Championships

Final
- Champion: (United States) Jimmy Connors
- Runner-up: (United States) John McEnroe
- Score: 3–6, 6–3, 6–7^{(2–7)}, 7–6^{(7–5)}, 6–4

Details
- Draw: 128 (16 Q / 8 WC )
- Seeds: 16

Events
Singles	men	women		boys	girls
Doubles	men	women	mixed	boys	girls
WC Singles	men	women	quad
WC Doubles	men	women	quad
Legends	men	women	seniors
← 1981 ·	Wimbledon Championships	· 1983 →

Jimmy Connors defeated defending champion John McEnroe in the final, 3–6, 6–3, 6–7^{(2–7)}, 7–6^{(7–5)}, 6–4 to win the gentlemen's singles tennis title at the 1982 Wimbledon Championships. It was his second Wimbledon title and sixth major title overall. The final was the first Wimbledon match in history that was deliberately scheduled to take place on a Sunday.

A number of high-profile players were absent from this tournament for various reasons. This included five-time champion Björn Borg, who refused to play after officials required him to play in a qualifying tournament due to being absent from the tour injured for most of 1982. Ivan Lendl and Eliot Teltscher both withdrew citing difficulty playing on the grass courts; and Argentine players Guillermo Vilas and José Luis Clerc withdrew in protest to their country's conflict with the United Kingdom over the Falkland Islands.

== Seeds ==
1. (United States) John McEnroe (final)
2. (United States) Jimmy Connors (champion)
3. (United States) Vitas Gerulaitis (quarterfinals)
4. (United States) Sandy Mayer (third round)
5. (South Africa) Johan Kriek (quarterfinals)
6. (United States) Gene Mayer (quarterfinals)
7. (Sweden) Mats Wilander (fourth round)
8. (Australia) Peter McNamara (first round)
9. (Ecuador) Andrés Gómez (first round)
10. (France) Yannick Noah (withdrew)
11. (United States) Brian Teacher (quarterfinals)
12. (Australia) Mark Edmondson (semifinals)
13. (United States) Brian Gottfried (second round)
14. (United States) Roscoe Tanner (fourth round)
15. (United Kingdom) Buster Mottram (fourth round)
16. (United States) Steve Denton (fourth round)

Click on the seed number of a player to go to their draw section.

Yannick Noah withdrew due to injury. He was replaced in the draw by lucky loser Richard Meyer.

== Draw ==
=== Key ===
- Q = Qualifier
- WC = Wild card
- LL = Lucky loser
- Alt = Alternate
- ITF = ITF entry
- PR = Protected ranking
- SR = Special ranking
- SE = Special exempt
- JE = Junior exempt
- JR = Junior Accelerator Programme entrant
- CO = College Accelerator Programme entrant
- NG = Next Gen Accelerator Program entrant
- w/o = Walkover
- r = Retired
- d = Defaulted

=== Finals ===
Quarterfinals
1	(United States) John McEnroe	4	6	7	6
5	(South Africa) Johan Kriek	6	2	5	3
(United States) Tim Mayotte	6	7	7	3	6
11	(United States) Brian Teacher	7	6	5	6	1
12	(Australia) Mark Edmondson	7	3	6	6
3	(United States) Vitas Gerulaitis	6	6	4	3
6	(United States) Gene Mayer	1	2	6
2	(United States) Jimmy Connors	6	6	7

Semifinals
1	(United States) John McEnroe	6	6	6
(United States) Tim Mayotte	3	1	2
12	(Australia) Mark Edmondson	4	3	1
2	(United States) Jimmy Connors	6	6	6

Final
1	(United States) John McEnroe	6	3	7^{7}	6^{5}	4
2	(United States) Jimmy Connors	3	6	6^{2}	7^{7}	6

=== Top half ===
==== Section 1 ====
First round
1	(United States) J McEnroe	6	6	6
(United States) V Winitsky	2	2	1
LL	(Australia) G Whitecross	4	7	2	5
Q	(South Africa) E Edwards	6	6	6	7
(Brazil) C Motta	3	6	6	6
(South Africa) F Sauer	6	2	4	4
(Romania) I Năstase	1	3	6	4
(United States) L Bourne	6	6	3	6
(United States) B Manson	3	4	6
(United States) R Stockton	6	6	7
(Australia) J Fitzgerald	6	7	6
(Czechoslovakia) J Granát	2	6	4
(United States) H Pfister	6	6	6
(United States) M Purcell	2	3	4
(United States) S Smith	6	6	5	7
9/WC	(Ecuador) A Gómez	4	3	7	6

Second round
1	(United States) J McEnroe	6	6	7
Q	(South Africa) E Edwards	3	3	5
(Brazil) C Motta	4	4	6	7	3
(United States) L Bourne	6	6	1	5	6
(United States) R Stockton	4	3	1
(Australia) J Fitzgerald	6	6	6
(United States) H Pfister	6	7	7
(United States) S Smith	4	6	6

Third round
1	(United States) J McEnroe	6	6	6
(United States) L Bourne	2	2	0
(Australia) J Fitzgerald	4	7	4	7	2
(United States) H Pfister	6	5	6	5	6

Fourth round
1	(United States) J McEnroe	6	6	6
(United States) H Pfister	4	4	4

==== Section 2 ====
First round
13	(United States) B Gottfried	7	7	6
(France) G Moretton	6	6	2
(United States) N Saviano	6	6	7
(Spain) Á Giménez	2	1	6
(Australia) D Carter	6	6	6
(France) J Potier	2	3	4
(United States) A Andrews	6	7	7
(Australia) C Fancutt	1	6	6
(United States) P Rennert	6	3	3	6	6
(South Africa) D Tarr	3	6	6	2	4
WC	(United Kingdom) J Smith	2	6	6	7
(Spain) J Avendaño	6	1	4	6
(West Germany) P Elter	6	7	6
Q	(United States) C Dunk	4	6	3
Q	(United States) C Wittus	7	3	1	0
5	(South Africa) J Kriek	6	6	6	6

Second round
13	(United States) B Gottfried	7	7	5	4	1
(United States) N Saviano	6	6	7	6	6
(Australia) D Carter	3	7	6	6	9
(United States) A Andrews	6	5	7	3	7
(United States) P Rennert	7	7	4	6
WC	(United Kingdom) J Smith	6	6	6	3
(West Germany) P Elter	6	3	6	0	4
5	(South Africa) J Kriek	4	6	3	6	6

Third round
(United States) N Saviano	6	6	6
(Australia) D Carter	4	4	4
(United States) P Rennert	6	3	4	1
5	(South Africa) J Kriek	4	6	6	6

Fourth round
(United States) N Saviano	2	3	5
5	(South Africa) J Kriek	6	6	7

==== Section 3 ====
First round
4	(United States) A Mayer	7	6	6
(Zimbabwe) H Ismail	5	2	3
Q	(Switzerland) C Dowdeswell	6	3	6	6
(France) G Goven	2	6	3	2
(United States) T Mayotte	6	6	6	6
WC	(United States) P Fleming	7	4	3	4
Q	(India) S Menon	6	7	6
(Czechoslovakia) P Složil	2	6	0
Q	(Israel) D Schneider	6	3	6
(Australia) C Johnstone	7	6	7
(United States) J Lapidus	3	7	6	6
(Hungary) Z Kuhárszky	6	5	3	0
(United States) V Amaya	7	6	6
WC	(United Kingdom) N Brown	6	3	3
(Sweden) A Järryd	7	1	3	2
15	(United Kingdom) C Mottram	6	6	6	6

Second round
4	(United States) A Mayer	6	6	6
Q	(Switzerland) C Dowdeswell	2	2	3
(United States) T Mayotte	6	6	3	7
Q	(India) S Menon	4	2	6	5
(Australia) C Johnstone	6	6	6	6
(United States) J Lapidus	2	7	4	4
(United States) V Amaya	4	7	4	4
15	(United Kingdom) C Mottram	6	5	6	6

Third round
4	(United States) A Mayer	6	7	4	2	4
(United States) T Mayotte	3	6	6	6	6
(Australia) C Johnstone	1	3	2
15	(United Kingdom) C Mottram	6	6	6

Fourth round
(United States) T Mayotte	6	7	6
15	(United Kingdom) C Mottram	2	5	3

==== Section 4 ====
First round
11	(United States) B Teacher	3	7	6	4	6
(Israel) S Glickstein	6	6	4	6	2
(United States) P DuPré	7	3	6	3
(Australia) R Frawley	6	6	7	6
(Sweden) S Simonsson	7	6	6
(United States) W Scanlon	5	4	1
(Finland) L Palin	3	6	7	4	6
(Australia) C Miller	6	2	6	6	4
Q	(United States) R Evett	4	4	6	2
(Czechoslovakia) S Birner	6	6	2	6
(Italy) C Panatta	2	6	6	6
(United States) R Fagel	6	0	1	2
(Nigeria) N Odizor	4	7	7	7
(Spain) J Lopez-Maeso	6	6	5	6
(Switzerland) H Günthardt	4	3	6	3
7	(Sweden) M Wilander	6	6	3	6

Second round
11	(United States) B Teacher	7	6	4	6
(Australia) R Frawley	5	3	6	3
(Sweden) S Simonsson	6	6	6	7
(Finland) L Palin	3	4	7	5
(Czechoslovakia) S Birner	6	3	3	6	6
(Italy) C Panatta	4	6	6	1	4
(Nigeria) N Odizor	6	4	0
7	(Sweden) M Wilander	7	6	6

Third round
11	(United States) B Teacher	7	4	6	6
(Sweden) S Simonsson	6	6	3	3
(Czechoslovakia) S Birner	3	4	4
7	(Sweden) M Wilander	6	6	6

Fourth round
11	(United States) B Teacher	6	6	6
7	(Sweden) M Wilander	4	4	3

=== Bottom half ===
==== Section 5 ====
First round
8	(Australia) P McNamara	6	6	2	4
(United States) C Hooper	7	3	6	6
(New Zealand) R Simpson	3	4	7	6	6
WC	(United Kingdom) J Lloyd	6	6	6	4	4
(United States) S Krulevitz	4	2	3
(Brazil) M Hocevar	6	6	6
(Paraguay) F González	6	6	6	5	6
(United States) S McCain	3	2	7	7	1
Q	(United States) D Dowlen	6	3	6	6
(Sweden) J Nyström	3	6	1	3
(India) R Krishnan	6	2	4	7	6
WC	(United Kingdom) A Jarrett	4	6	6	6	2
Q	(Sweden) H Sundström	6	3	2
(Brazil) J Soares	7	6	6
(United States) M Davis	6	5	5
12	(Australia) M Edmondson	7	7	7

Second round
(United States) C Hooper	3	6	3	7	9
(New Zealand) R Simpson	6	1	6	6	11
(Brazil) M Hocevar	7	4	7	7
(Paraguay) F González	6	6	6	6
Q	(United States) D Dowlen	4	5	0
(India) R Krishnan	6	7	6
(Brazil) J Soares	3	5	3
12	(Australia) M Edmondson	6	7	6

Third round
(New Zealand) R Simpson	3	5	6	7	6
(Brazil) M Hocevar	6	7	3	6	3
(India) R Krishnan	3	6	1	4
12	(Australia) M Edmondson	6	1	6	6

Fourth round
(New Zealand) R Simpson	4	6	6
12	(Australia) M Edmondson	6	7	7

==== Section 6 ====
First round
14	(United States) R Tanner	6	7	6
(France) H Leconte	4	5	4
(United States) F Buehning	6	6	7
(United States) M Estep	3	3	6
(United States) J Austin	6	2	2
(France) P Portes	7	6	6
(United States) J Borowiak	7	6	3	4	3
Q	(India) V Amritraj	6	4	6	6	6
(France) B Fritz	6	7	4	6	6
(Spain) S Casal	2	5	6	7	3
(Czechoslovakia) T Šmid	6	7	6
(United Kingdom) R Lewis	3	6	0
(South Africa) D Visser	7	6	3	5
(New Zealand) B Derlin	5	7	6	7
LL	(South Africa) B Pirow	4	1	1
3	(United States) V Gerulaitis	6	6	6

Second round
14	(United States) R Tanner	6	6	6	6
(United States) F Buehning	3	3	7	4
(France) P Portes	2	3	2
Q	(India) V Amritraj	6	6	6
(France) B Fritz	4	4	3
(Czechoslovakia) T Šmid	6	6	6
(New Zealand) B Derlin	5	2	3
3	(United States) V Gerulaitis	7	6	6

Third round
14	(United States) R Tanner	6	6	4	4	6
Q	(India) V Amritraj	4	4	6	6	3
(Czechoslovakia) T Šmid	7	6	3	4	2
3	(United States) V Gerulaitis	6	3	6	6	6

Fourth round
14	(United States) R Tanner	3	4	3
3	(United States) V Gerulaitis	6	6	6

==== Section 7 ====
First round
6	(United States) E Mayer	5	6	6	7
(United States) Ti Gullikson	7	4	1	5
(Australia) B Drewett	7	6	6
Q	(Australia) P Doohan	6	2	4
Q	(United States) L Stefanki	6	6	6
(Colombia) A Cortes	4	2	1
(United States) E Fromm	6	3	7	6
Q	(Australia) S Ball	4	6	6	2
(Brazil) J Góes	2	3	2
(New Zealand) C Lewis	6	6	6
(United States) To Gullikson	6	6	6
WC	(United Kingdom) J Bates	4	4	3
Q	(South Africa) S van der Merwe	6	6	7
(United States) T Moor	4	2	6
(United States) J Sadri	7	6	4	6	3
16	(United States) S Denton	6	7	6	3	6

Second round
6	(United States) E Mayer	6	6	6	6
(Australia) B Drewett	7	3	2	1
Q	(United States) L Stefanki	6	4	6	7
(United States) E Fromm	3	6	4	6
(New Zealand) C Lewis	7	7	7
(United States) To Gullikson	6	6	6
Q	(South Africa) S van der Merwe	7	5	6	4	11
16	(United States) S Denton	6	7	3	6	13

Third round
6	(United States) E Mayer	7	6	6
Q	(United States) L Stefanki	6	3	0
(New Zealand) C Lewis	6	5	7	5
16	(United States) S Denton	7	7	6	7

Fourth round
6	(United States) E Mayer	6	6	6
16	(United States) S Denton	3	4	4

==== Section 8 ====
First round
LL	(United States) R Meyer	6	3	2	7	4
(United States) R Lutz	2	6	6	6	6
(Australia) P McNamee	5	6	7	7
(United States) M Doyle	7	3	6	6
(Belgium) B Boileau	6	3	2	7	6
(United States) V Van Patten	4	6	6	5	1
WC	(United Kingdom) J Feaver	2	2	2
(South Africa) K Curren	6	6	6
(France) T Tulasne	6	6	3	7
Q	(Australia) M Fancutt	3	4	6	6
Q	(United States) D Gitlin	7	7	6
(West Germany) A Maurer	5	5	4
(Australia) J Alexander	2	5	7	6	7
(Australia) K Warwick	6	7	6	3	5
LL	(South Africa) M Myburg	0	2	2
2	(United States) J Connors	6	6	6

Second round
(United States) R Lutz	1	6	3	6
(Australia) P McNamee	6	1	6	7
(Belgium) B Boileau	4	3	2
(South Africa) K Curren	6	6	6
(France) T Tulasne	3	4	2
Q	(United States) D Gitlin	6	6	6
(Australia) J Alexander	3	6	1	6
2	(United States) J Connors	6	4	6	7

Third round
(Australia) P McNamee	7	3	3	6	6
(South Africa) K Curren	6	6	6	4	1
Q	(United States) D Gitlin	2	7	5	5
2	(United States) J Connors	6	6	7	7

Fourth round
(Australia) P McNamee	2	3	1
2	(United States) J Connors	6	6	6

Preceded by 1982 French Open	Grand Slams; Men's Singles	Succeeded by 1982 US Open
