= 1982 Benson and Hedges Open =

- Date: 11–17 January
- Edition: 15th
- Category: Grand Prix
- Draw: 32S / 16D
- Prize money: $75,000
- Surface: Hard / outdoor
- Location: Auckland, New Zealand

Champions

Singles
- (United States) Tim Wilkison

Doubles
- (United Kingdom) Andrew Jarrett / (United Kingdom) Jonathan Smith
- ATP Auckland Open

The 1982 Benson and Hedges Open was a men's professional tennis tournament held in Auckland, New Zealand. The event was part of the 1982 Grand Prix circuit. It was the 15th edition of the tournament and was played on outdoor hardcourts and was held from 11 January through 17 January 1982. Second-seeded Tim Wilkison won the singles title.

== Finals ==
=== Singles ===
(United States) Tim Wilkison defeated (New Zealand) Russell Simpson 6–4, 6–4, 6–4

- It was Wilkison's only title of the year and the 7th of his career.

=== Doubles ===
(United Kingdom) Andrew Jarrett / (United Kingdom) Jonathan Smith defeated (United States) Larry Stefanki / (United States) Robert Van't Hof 7–5, 7–6

- It was Jarrett's only title of the year and the 1st of his career. It was Smith's 1st title of the year and the 1st of his career.
