= 1982 Wimbledon Championships – Mixed doubles =

Mixed doubles
- 1982 Wimbledon Championships

Final
- Champions: (South Africa) Kevin Curren (United States) Anne Smith
- Runners-up: (United Kingdom) John Lloyd (Australia) Wendy Turnbull
- Score: 2–6, 6–3, 7–5

Details
- Draw: 48 (4 Q )
- Seeds: 8

Events
Singles	men	women		boys	girls
Doubles	men	women	mixed	boys	girls
WC Singles	men	women	quad
WC Doubles	men	women	quad
Legends	men	women	seniors
← 1981 ·	Wimbledon Championships	· 1983 →

Frew McMillan and Betty Stöve were the defending champions, but lost in the third round to Chris Johnstone and Pam Whytcross.

Kevin Curren and Anne Smith defeated John Lloyd and Wendy Turnbull in the final, 2–6, 6–3, 7–5 to win the mixed doubles tennis title at the 1982 Wimbledon Championships.

== Seeds ==
1. (South Africa) Frew McMillan / (Netherlands) Betty Stöve (third round)
2. (United States) John Austin / (United States) Tracy Austin (first round)
3. (United Kingdom) John Lloyd / (Australia) Wendy Turnbull (final)
4. (South Africa) Kevin Curren / (United States) Anne Smith (champions)
5. (United States) Steve Denton / (United States) JoAnne Russell (quarterfinals)
6. (United States) Dick Stockton / (West Germany) Bettina Bunge (quarterfinals)
7. (India) Vijay Amritraj / (United Kingdom) Virginia Wade (second round)
8. (Australia) Owen Davidson / (United States) Billie Jean King (third round)

Click on the seed number of a player to go to their draw section.

== Draw ==
=== Key ===
- Q = Qualifier
- WC = Wild card
- LL = Lucky loser
- Alt = Alternate
- SE = Special exempt
- PR = Protected ranking
- ITF = ITF entry
- JE = Junior exempt
- w/o = Walkover
- r = Retired
- d = Defaulted
- SR = Special ranking

=== Finals ===
Quarterfinals
(Australia) Chris Johnstone (Australia) Pam Whytcross	5	6	6
(United States) Dennis Ralston (United States) Sharon Walsh	7	4	2
3	(United Kingdom) John Lloyd (Australia) Wendy Turnbull	6	6
5	(United States) Steve Denton (United States) JoAnne Russell	4	2
6	(United States) Dick Stockton (West Germany) Bettina Bunge	4	6
4	(South Africa) Kevin Curren (United States) Anne Smith	6	7
(United States) Buzz Strode (Hungary) Andrea Temesvári	6	6
(United States) Chip Hooper (United States) Anne White	4	2

Semifinals
(Australia) Chris Johnstone (Australia) Pam Whytcross	4	0
3	(United Kingdom) John Lloyd (Australia) Wendy Turnbull	6	6
4	(South Africa) Kevin Curren (United States) Anne Smith	6	7
(United States) Buzz Strode (Hungary) Andrea Temesvári	4	5

Final
3	(United Kingdom) John Lloyd (Australia) Wendy Turnbull	6	3	5
4	(South Africa) Kevin Curren (United States) Anne Smith	2	6	7

=== Top half ===
==== Section 1 ====
First round
1	(South Africa) F McMillan (Netherlands) B Stöve	w/o
(Australia) C Fancutt (Australia) S Leo
(South Africa) D Visser (South Africa) S Rollinson	6	6
(United States) D Gitlin (United States) E Norton	4	3
(Australia) R Case (United States) M-L Piatek
(United States) M Freedman (United States) B Hallquist	w/o
(United Kingdom) J Feaver (United Kingdom) A Hobbs	3	7	5
8	(Australia) O Davidson (United States) BJ King	6	5	7

Second round
1	(South Africa) F McMillan (Netherlands) B Stöve	w/o
(United Kingdom) J Bates (United Kingdom) J Durie
(Australia) C Johnstone (Australia) P Whytcross	6	6
(South Africa) D Visser (South Africa) S Rollinson	2	4
(United States) M Freedman (United States) B Hallquist	3	6
(United States) D Ralston (United States) S Walsh	6	7
(South Africa) R Moore (South Africa) T Harford	1	6
8	(Australia) O Davidson (United States) BJ King	6	7

Third round
1	(South Africa) F McMillan (Netherlands) B Stöve	3	5
(Australia) C Johnstone (Australia) P Whytcross	6	7
(United States) D Ralston (United States) S Walsh	6	6
8	(Australia) O Davidson (United States) BJ King	4	4

Quarterfinals
(Australia) C Johnstone (Australia) P Whytcross	5	6	6
(United States) D Ralston (United States) S Walsh	7	4	2

==== Section 2 ====
First round
(United States) M Doyle (United States) K Sands	6	7
(Australia) C Letcher (Czechoslovakia) H Suková	4	6
(West Germany) J Fassbender (West Germany) C Kohde
(United States) B Manson (United States) P Teeguarden	w/o
(Australia) A Roche (Australia) J Byrne	6	6	6
(Australia) I Goolagong (Australia) E Goolagong Cawley	0	7	3
(United States) F Buehning (United States) A Leand
5	(United States) S Denton (United States) J Russell	w/o

Second round
3	(United Kingdom) J Lloyd (Australia) W Turnbull	6	6
(United States) M Doyle (United States) K Sands	4	1
(South Africa) B Mitton (South Africa) I Kloss
(United States) B Manson (United States) P Teeguarden	w/o
(Australia) A Roche (Australia) J Byrne	w/o
(Ecuador) A Gómez (United States) K Rinaldi
(Switzerland) C Dowdeswell (South Africa) R Fairbank
5	(United States) S Denton (United States) J Russell	w/o

Third round
3	(United Kingdom) J Lloyd (Australia) W Turnbull	7	7
(United States) B Manson (United States) P Teeguarden	6	5
(Australia) A Roche (Australia) J Byrne	4	3
5	(United States) S Denton (United States) J Russell	6	6

Quarterfinals
3	(United Kingdom) J Lloyd (Australia) W Turnbull	6	6
5	(United States) S Denton (United States) J Russell	4	2

=== Bottom half ===
==== Section 3 ====
First round
6	(United States) R Stockton (West Germany) B Bunge	7	6
(United States) J Evert (United States) C Evert Lloyd	6	4
(United Kingdom) A Jarrett (United Kingdom) D Jevans	w/o
(United States) M Davis (United States) B Jordan
(United States) S McCain (United States) B Potter
(Chile) J Fillol (Brazil) C Monteiro	w/o
(United States) L Stefanki (United States) A Kiyomura	7	2	7
(Netherlands) T Okker (Netherlands) M Mesker	5	6	5

Second round
6	(United States) R Stockton (West Germany) B Bunge	6	3	7
Q	(United Kingdom) M Guntrip (United States) H Ludloff	3	6	5
(United Kingdom) A Jarrett (United Kingdom) D Jevans	1	6	1
(United States) P Rennert (United States) L Allen	6	3	6
Q	(United States) J Turpin (United States) K Steinmetz
(Chile) J Fillol (Brazil) C Monteiro	w/o
(United States) L Stefanki (United States) A Kiyomura	3	2
4	(South Africa) K Curren (United States) A Smith	6	6

Third round
6	(United States) R Stockton (West Germany) B Bunge	6	6
(United States) P Rennert (United States) L Allen	2	4
(Chile) J Fillol (Brazil) C Monteiro	3	6
4	(South Africa) K Curren (United States) A Smith	6	7

Quarterfinals
6	(United States) R Stockton (West Germany) B Bunge	4	6
4	(South Africa) K Curren (United States) A Smith	6	7

==== Section 4 ====
First round
7	(India) V Amritraj (United Kingdom) V Wade	w/o
(France) F Jauffret (Romania) L Romanov
(South Africa) S van der Merwe (South Africa) Y Vermaak	6	6
Q	(Australia) M Bates (Australia) B Remilton	3	4
(India) A Amritraj (United States) W White	6	5	7
Q	(United States) E Fromm (United States) E Burgin	3	7	5
(United States) C Hooper (United States) A White	7	6
2	(United States) J Austin (United States) T Austin	5	2

Second round
7	(India) V Amritraj (United Kingdom) V Wade	2	6	2
(United States) C Strode (Hungary) A Temesvári	6	3	6
(United States) C Pasarell (United States) R Casals	7	4	4
(South Africa) S van der Merwe (South Africa) Y Vermaak	6	6	6
(United States) M Strode (United States) P Smith
(India) A Amritraj (United States) W White	w/o
(United States) C Dunk (United States) S Margolin
(United States) C Hooper (United States) A White	w/o

Third round
(United States) C Strode (Hungary) A Temesvári	6	7
(South Africa) S van der Merwe (South Africa) Y Vermaak	3	5
(India) A Amritraj (United States) W White	2	4
(United States) C Hooper (United States) A White	6	6

Quarterfinals
(United States) C Strode (Hungary) A Temesvári	6	6
(United States) C Hooper (United States) A White	4	2
