= 1982 Wimbledon Championships – Men's doubles =

Men's doubles
- 1982 Wimbledon Championships

Final
- Champions: (Australia) Peter McNamara (Australia) Paul McNamee
- Runners-up: (United States) Peter Fleming (United States) John McEnroe
- Score: 6–3, 6–2

Details
- Draw: 64 (5Q / 5WC)
- Seeds: 16

Events
Singles	men	women		boys	girls
Doubles	men	women	mixed	boys	girls
WC Singles	men	women	quad
WC Doubles	men	women	quad
Legends	men	women	seniors
- Wimbledon Championships

Peter McNamara and Paul McNamee defeated the defending champions Peter Fleming and John McEnroe in the final, 6–3, 6–2 to win the gentlemen's doubles title at the 1982 Wimbledon Championships.

== Seeds ==
1. (United States) Peter Fleming / (United States) John McEnroe (final)
2. (United States) Sherwood Stewart / (United States) Ferdi Taygan (semifinals)
3. (Australia) Peter McNamara / (Australia) Paul McNamee (champions)
4. (South Africa) Kevin Curren / (United States) Steve Denton (semifinals)
5. n/a
6. (United States) Bob Lutz / (United States) Stan Smith (second round)
7. (Australia) Mark Edmondson / (Australia) Kim Warwick (quarterfinals)
8. (Czechoslovakia) Pavel Složil / (Czechoslovakia) Tomáš Šmíd (first round)
9. (United States) Victor Amaya / (United States) Hank Pfister (third round)
10. (Sweden) Anders Järryd / (Sweden) Hans Simonsson (second round)
11. (United States) Fritz Buehning / (United States) Peter Rennert (second round)
12. (United States) Sandy Mayer / (United States) Frew McMillan (third round)
13. (United States) Bruce Manson / (United States) Brian Teacher (first round)
14. (United States) Tim Gullikson / (United States) Tom Gullikson (first round)
15. (South Africa) Johan Kriek / (United States) Larry Stefanki (second round)
16. n/a

Click on the seed number of a player to go to their draw section.

== Draw ==
Key

- Q = Qualifier
- WC = Wild card
- LL = Lucky loser
- Alt = Alternate
- ITF = ITF entry
- PR = Protected ranking
- SR = Special ranking
- SE = Special exempt
- JE = Junior exempt
- JR = Junior Accelerator Programme entrant
- CO = College Accelerator Programme entrant
- NG = Next Gen Accelerator Program entrant
- w/o = Walkover
- r = Retired
- d = Defaulted

=== Finals ===
Quarterfinals
1	(United States) Peter Fleming (United States) John McEnroe	3	7	6
(Brazil) Marcos Hocevar (Brazil) João Soares	6	5	2
4	(South Africa) Kevin Curren (United States) Steve Denton	7	7
(United Kingdom) John Lloyd (United States) Dick Stockton	6	6
7	(Australia) Mark Edmondson (Australia) Kim Warwick	3	4
3	(Australia) Peter McNamara (Australia) Paul McNamee	6	6
(United States) Marty Davis (United States) Chris Dunk	3	4
2	(United States) Sherwood Stewart (United States) Ferdi Taygan	6	6

Semifinals
1	(United States) Peter Fleming (United States) John McEnroe	6	6	2	6
4	(South Africa) Kevin Curren (United States) Steve Denton	2	4	6	3
3	(Australia) Peter McNamara (Australia) Paul McNamee	4	6	6	7	6
2	(United States) Sherwood Stewart (United States) Ferdi Taygan	6	4	7	6	4

Final
1	(United States) Peter Fleming (United States) John McEnroe	3	2
3	(Australia) Peter McNamara (Australia) Paul McNamee	6	6

=== Top half ===
==== Section 1 ====
First round
1	(United States) P Fleming (United States) J McEnroe	6	6	6
Q	(Australia) B Dyke (Australia) P Johnston	2	4	4
(Australia) R Frawley (New Zealand) C Lewis	6	6	6
(United States) A Andrews (United States) J Sadri	7	3	4
(Australia) C Letcher (United Kingdom) R Lewis	6	6
LL	(United States) R Crowley (United States) A Scheinman	3	4
(United States) D Dowlen (Nigeria) N Odizor	3	7	11
13	(United States) B Manson (United States) B Teacher	6	6	9
9	(United States) V Amaya (United States) H Pfister	6	2
(Brazil) M Hocevar (Brazil) J Soares	7	6
Q	(United States) T Bennett (Canada) N Mohtadi	6	2
(United States) E Fromm (United States) C Leeds	7	6
(Switzerland) M Günthardt (Philippines) B Sison	6	2	6
(United States) L Bourne (Australia) D Carter	3	6	4
(United States) C Strode (United States) M Strode	6	4	6
LL	(United States) J Lapidus (Australia) P Smylie	2	6	3

Second round
1	(United States) P Fleming (United States) J McEnroe	7	3	8
(Australia) R Frawley (New Zealand) C Lewis	6	6	6
(Australia) C Letcher (United Kingdom) R Lewis	2	6
(United States) D Dowlen (Nigeria) N Odizor	6	7
(Brazil) M Hocevar (Brazil) J Soares	6	7
(United States) E Fromm (United States) C Leeds	2	5
(Switzerland) M Günthardt (Philippines) B Sison	6	6
(United States) C Strode (United States) M Strode	4	4

Third round
1	(United States) P Fleming (United States) J McEnroe	6	7
(United States) D Dowlen (Nigeria) N Odizor	4	6
(Brazil) M Hocevar (Brazil) J Soares	6	6	6
(Switzerland) M Günthardt (Philippines) B Sison	7	3	4

Fourth round
1	(United States) P Fleming (United States) J McEnroe	3	7	6
(Brazil) M Hocevar (Brazil) J Soares	6	5	2

==== Section 2 ====
First round
4	(South Africa) K Curren (United States) S Denton	7	6
(United States) D Gitlin (United States) B Nichols	6	3
Q	(United Kingdom) W Davies (United Kingdom) M Guntrip	6	2
(United Kingdom) A Jarrett (United Kingdom) J Smith	7	6
LL	(South Africa) C Louw (South Africa) B Moir	6	1
(United States) M Estep (Australia) P Kronk	7	6
(United States) C Hooper (United States) T Mayotte	4	2
12	(United States) A Mayer (South Africa) F McMillan	6	6
LL	(Australia) C Fancutt (Australia) M Fancutt	1	7	2
(South Africa) C Viljoen (South Africa) D Visser	6	6	6
(United States) S Krulevitz (United States) R Meyer	6	6	6
(Australia) J Alexander (Chile) J Fillol	7	3	4
(United Kingdom) J Lloyd (United States) R Stockton	6	3	6
Q	(Australia) J McCurdy (Australia) G Whitecross	4	6	4
(United States) T Graham (United States) M Mitchell	7	7
8	(Czechoslovakia) P Složil (Czechoslovakia) T Šmíd	5	6

Second round
4	(South Africa) K Curren (United States) S Denton	7	6
(United Kingdom) A Jarrett (United Kingdom) J Smith	6	3
(United States) M Estep (Australia) P Kronk	3	6	2
12	(United States) A Mayer (South Africa) F McMillan	6	4	6
(South Africa) C Viljoen (South Africa) D Visser	6	6
(United States) S Krulevitz (United States) R Meyer	4	4
(United Kingdom) J Lloyd (United States) R Stockton	6	7	6
(United States) T Graham (United States) M Mitchell	7	5	2

Third round
4	(South Africa) K Curren (United States) S Denton	7	6
12	(United States) A Mayer (South Africa) F McMillan	6	3
(South Africa) C Viljoen (South Africa) D Visser	6	6	10
(United Kingdom) J Lloyd (United States) R Stockton	3	7	12

Fourth round
4	(South Africa) K Curren (United States) S Denton	7	7
(United Kingdom) J Lloyd (United States) R Stockton	6	6

=== Bottom half ===
==== Section 3 ====
First round
7	(Australia) M Edmondson (Australia) K Warwick	6	6
(United States) B Gottfried (United States) W Scanlon	3	4
(United States) R Tanner (United States) E van Dillen	6	6	4
Q	(South Africa) F Sauer (South Africa) S van der Merwe	4	7	6
(Australia) S Ball (New Zealand) R Simpson	6	6
(India) A Amritraj (United States) J Austin	3	4
WC	(Australia) J Newcombe (Australia) A Roche	6	6	3	2
10	(Sweden) A Järryd (Sweden) H Simonsson	7	3	6	6
14	(United States) Ti Gullikson (United States) To Gullikson	3	6
(Paraguay) F González (South Africa) R Moore	6	7
(Australia) C Johnstone (Australia) C Miller	6	6	6
(Egypt) I El Shafei (United Kingdom) J Feaver	4	7	3
(Czechoslovakia) S Birner (Czechoslovakia) J Kodeš	5	5
(United States) C Edwards (South Africa) E Edwards	7	7
WC	(Netherlands) T Okker (United States) M Riessen	2	2
3	(Australia) P McNamara (Australia) P McNamee	6	6

Second round
7	(Australia) M Edmondson (Australia) K Warwick	6	6
Q	(South Africa) F Sauer (South Africa) S van der Merwe	3	4
(Australia) S Ball (New Zealand) R Simpson	7	6	6
10	(Sweden) A Järryd (Sweden) H Simonsson	6	7	2
(Paraguay) F González (South Africa) R Moore	2	6	4
(Australia) C Johnstone (Australia) C Miller	6	2	6
(United States) C Edwards (South Africa) E Edwards	2	4
3	(Australia) P McNamara (Australia) P McNamee	6	6

Third round
7	(Australia) M Edmondson (Australia) K Warwick	6	3	12
(Australia) S Ball (New Zealand) R Simpson	4	6	10
(Australia) C Johnstone (Australia) C Miller	2	4
3	(Australia) P McNamara (Australia) P McNamee	6	6

Fourth round
7	(Australia) M Edmondson (Australia) K Warwick	3	4
3	(Australia) P McNamara (Australia) P McNamee	6	6

==== Section 4 ====
First round
6	(United States) R Lutz (United States) S Smith	1	6	6
(Colombia) A Cortes (United States) M Gandolfo	6	2	1
(Czechoslovakia) J Granát (Sweden) H Sundström	6	4
LL	(New Zealand) D Mustard (Australia) W Pascoe	7	6
(United States) S Meister (United States) C Wittus	4	1
(United States) M Davis (United States) C Dunk	6	6
(West Germany) A Maurer (United Kingdom) C Mottram	1^{r}
15	(South Africa) J Kriek (United States) L Stefanki	1
11	(United States) F Buehning (United States) P Rennert	6	6
WC	(United Kingdom) J Bates (United Kingdom) N Brown	2	2
(Australia) B Drewett (Hungary) Z Kuhárszky	7	7
(New Zealand) B Derlin (United States) M Doyle	6	6
WC	(United Kingdom) J Dier (United Kingdom) J Whiteford	6	7	6
WC	(Switzerland) C Dowdeswell (United Kingdom) R Drysdale	7	5	4
(United States) T Delatte (United States) M Purcell	6	3
2	(United States) S Stewart (United States) F Taygan	7	6

Second round
6	(United States) R Lutz (United States) S Smith	4	6
LL	(New Zealand) D Mustard (Australia) W Pascoe	6	7
(United States) M Davis (United States) C Dunk	3	6	6
(South Africa) J Kriek (United States) L Stefanki	6	3	4
11	(United States) F Buehning (United States) P Rennert	4	7	3
(Australia) B Drewett (Hungary) Z Kuhárszky	6	6	6
WC	(United Kingdom) J Dier (United Kingdom) J Whiteford	6	2	3
2	(United States) S Stewart (United States) F Taygan	3	6	6

Third round
LL	(New Zealand) D Mustard (Australia) W Pascoe	6	6	4
(United States) M Davis (United States) C Dunk	7	3	6
(Australia) B Drewett (Hungary) Z Kuhárszky	6	3
2	(United States) S Stewart (United States) F Taygan	7	6

Fourth round
(United States) M Davis (United States) C Dunk	3	4
2	(United States) S Stewart (United States) F Taygan	6	6
