= Susan Rollinson =

South African tennis player

- Country (sports): South Africa
- Born: 22 August 1961 (age 64) Johannesburg, South Africa
- Prize money: US$ 33,836

Singles

Grand Slam singles results
- French Open: 1R (1981, 1982, 1983)
- Wimbledon: 1R (1980, 1981, 1982)
- US Open: 2R (1981)

Doubles

Grand Slam doubles results
- French Open: 2R (1982)
- Wimbledon: 2R (1981)
- US Open: 1R (1981, 1982)

Grand Slam mixed doubles results
- Wimbledon: 2R (1982)

Susan Rollinson (born 22 August 1961) is a South African former professional tennis player.

Rollinson, born in Johannesburg, competed on the professional tour in the early 1980s. She had two noteworthy upset wins in 1981, over Wendy Turnbull in Hilton Head and Billie Jean King in Haines City.

At grand slam level, Rollinson made her only second round at the 1981 US Open, but had held a match point that year against a young Kathy Rinaldi in the Wimbledon first round.
