= Shelley Walpole =

British tennis player (born 1965)

- Country (sports): United Kingdom
- Born: 17 September 1965 (age 60)
- Plays: Right-handed

Singles

Grand Slam singles results
- French Open: Q2 (1984)
- Wimbledon: 1R (1982, 1984)
- US Open: 1R (1983)

Shelley Walpole (born 17 September 1965) is a British former professional tennis player. She is now known by her married name, Shelley Roxburgh.

Walpole, the daughter of Concorde pilot Brian Walpole, competed on the professional tennis tour in the early 1980s. She is one of few players to have a positive head-to-head record against Steffi Graf, having beaten the German player in the quarter-finals at the ITF Warwickshire in Solihull in 1983.

During her tennis career, Walpole twice received a wildcard into the Wimbledon main draw and qualified for the 1983 US Open, where she lost in the first round to Chris Evert.

Walpole retired from professional tennis in 1984.

== Personal life ==
After retirement, Walpole emigrated to Canada. She is married to Cam Roxburgh, a pastor, with whom she lives near Vancouver. They have four children, one of whom is actress Melissa Roxburgh.
