= 1982 Wimbledon Championships – Women's singles =

Women's singles
- 1982 Wimbledon Championships

Final
- Champion: (United States) Martina Navratilova
- Runner-up: (United States) Chris Evert Lloyd
- Score: 6–1, 3–6, 6–2

Details
- Draw: 96 (8Q / 6WC)
- Seeds: 16

Events
| Singles | men | women | | boys | girls |
| Doubles | men | women | mixed | boys | girls |
| WC Singles | men | women | quad |
| WC Doubles | men | women | quad |
| Legends | men | women | seniors |
- Wimbledon Championships

Martina Navratilova defeated defending champion Chris Evert Lloyd in the final, 6–1, 3–6, 6–2 to win the ladies' singles tennis title at the 1982 Wimbledon Championships. It was her third Wimbledon singles title and fifth major singles title overall. It was the first of nine consecutive years that Navratilova would reach the Wimbledon singles final, winning seven of those finals.

The 16 seeded players were all given byes into the second round. This was the last Wimbledon singles championship to include byes in the first round.

== Seeds ==
1. (United States) Martina Navratilova (champion)
2. (United States) Chris Evert Lloyd (final)
3. (United States) Tracy Austin (quarterfinals)
4. (United States) Andrea Jaeger (fourth round)
5. (Czechoslovakia) Hana Mandlíková (second round)
6. (Australia) Wendy Turnbull (fourth round)
7. (United States) Pam Shriver (fourth round)
8. (Socialist Federal Republic of Yugoslavia) Mima Jaušovec (second round)
9. (West Germany) Sylvia Hanika (fourth round)
10. (United States) Barbara Potter (quarterfinals)
11. (West Germany) Bettina Bunge (semifinals)
12. (United States) Billie Jean King (semifinals)
13. (United States) Anne Smith (quarterfinals)
14. (United States) Andrea Leand (second round)
15. (Romania) Virginia Ruzici (fourth round)
16. (Australia) Evonne Goolagong Cawley (second round)

Click on the seed number of a player to go to their draw section.

Evonne Goolagong Cawley was seeded 16th at the request of the Women's Tennis Association, in recognition of her having won the tournament at her last appearance, before taking maternity leave from the tour. All sixteen seeded players were granted byes in the first round, the last time byes were used in the ladies' championship.

== Draw ==
Key

- Q = Qualifier
- WC = Wild card
- LL = Lucky loser
- Alt = Alternate
- ITF = ITF entry
- PR = Protected ranking
- SR = Special ranking
- SE = Special exempt
- JE = Junior exempt
- JR = Junior Accelerator Programme entrant
- CO = College Accelerator Programme entrant
- NG = Next Gen Accelerator Program entrant
- w/o = Walkover
- r = Retired
- d = Defaulted

=== Finals ===
Quarterfinals
1 | (United States) Martina Navratilova | 6 | 6
(United States) JoAnne Russell | 3 | 4
13 | (United States) Anne Smith | 3 | 6 | 0
11 | (West Germany) Bettina Bunge | 6 | 2 | 6
12 | (United States) Billie Jean King | 3 | 6 | 6
3 | (United States) Tracy Austin | 6 | 4 | 2
10 | (United States) Barbara Potter | 2 | 1
2 | (United States) Chris Evert Lloyd | 6 | 6

Semifinals
1 | (United States) Martina Navratilova | 6 | 6
11 | (West Germany) Bettina Bunge | 2 | 2
12 | (United States) Billie Jean King | 6 | 6 | 3
2 | (United States) Chris Evert Lloyd | 7 | 2 | 6

Final
1 | (United States) Martina Navratilova | 6 | 3 | 6
2 | (United States) Chris Evert Lloyd | 1 | 6 | 2

=== Top half ===
==== Section 1 ====
First round
WC | (United Kingdom) E Jones | 2 | 6 | 4
(United States) E Norton | 6 | 4 | 6
(United States) L duPont | 6 | 6 | 7
(United States) A White | 2 | 7 | 9
WC | (United Kingdom) A Croft | 6 | 3 | 1
(Romania) L Romanov | 1 | 6 | 6
WC | (United States) Z Garrison | 6 | 6
(United States) L-A Thompson | 0 | 2

Second round
1 | (United States) M Navratilova | 6 | 6
(United States) E Norton | 3 | 3
(United States) A White | 7 | 6
(Australia) A Minter | 5 | 3
(Romania) L Romanov | 3 | 6 | 7
(United Kingdom) A Hobbs | 6 | 1 | 5
WC | (United States) Z Garrison | 6 | 6
16 | (Australia) E Goolagong Cawley | 4 | 2

Third round
1 | (United States) M Navratilova | 6 | 6
(United States) A White | 1 | 4
(Romania) L Romanov | 0 | 4
WC | (United States) Z Garrison | 6 | 6

Fourth round
1 | (United States) M Navratilova | 6 | 6
WC | (United States) Z Garrison | 3 | 2

==== Section 2 ====
First round
WC | (United Kingdom) S Walpole | 0 | 2
(United States) P Smith | 6 | 6
(Hungary) A Temesvári | 7 | 7
(United States) D Desfor | 6 | 6
(United States) P Casale | 6 | 6
(United States) K Horvath | 4 | 1
(United States) S Mascarin | 6 | 5 | 2
(United States) J Russell | 4 | 7 | 6

Second round
9 | (West Germany) S Hanika | 6 | 6
(United States) P Smith | 2 | 4
(Czechoslovakia) R Tomanová | 4 | 6 | 5
(Hungary) A Temesvári | 6 | 3 | 7
(United States) R Casals | 6 | 2
(United States) P Casale | 7 | 6
(United States) J Russell | 6 | 6 | 7
8 | (Socialist Federal Republic of Yugoslavia) M Jaušovec | 7 | 3 | 5

Third round
9 | (West Germany) S Hanika | 6 | 6
(Hungary) A Temesvári | 2 | 2
(United States) P Casale | 6 | 6 | 4
(United States) J Russell | 1 | 7 | 6

Fourth round
9 | (West Germany) S Hanika | 4 | 7 | 3
(United States) J Russell | 6 | 6 | 6

==== Section 3 ====
First round
(United Kingdom) G Coles | 6 | 4 | 1
(South Korea) D-h Lee | 4 | 6 | 6
(South Africa) R Fairbank | 6 | 6
Q | (South Africa) S Rollinson | 3 | 2
Q | (Australia) B Remilton | 3 | 4
(United States) W White | 6 | 6
(Brazil) C Monteiro | 3 | 6 | 3
(Australia) S Leo | 6 | 2 | 6

Second round
4 | (United States) A Jaeger | 4 | 6 | 7
(South Korea) D-h Lee | 6 | 4 | 5
(South Africa) R Fairbank | 6 | 6
WC | (United Kingdom) E Lightbody | 0 | 4
(France) C Vanier | 6 | 7 | 7
(United States) W White | 7 | 6 | 5
(Australia) S Leo | 4 | 4
13 | (United States) A Smith | 6 | 6

Third round
4 | (United States) A Jaeger | 6 | 7
(South Africa) R Fairbank | 3 | 5
(France) C Vanier | 3 | 2
13 | (United States) A Smith | 6 | 6

Fourth round
4 | (United States) A Jaeger | 4 | 2
13 | (United States) A Smith | 6 | 6

==== Section 4 ====
First round
(France) C Tanvier | 4 | 6 | 6
(United States) L Allen | 6 | 4 | 8
(United Kingdom) J Durie | 6 | 6 | 2
(United Kingdom) V Wade | 3 | 7 | 6
(United States) L Bonder | 3 | 3
(United States) B Jordan | 6 | 6
Q | (United States) R Blount | 6 | 3
(United States) C Reynolds | 7 | 6

Second round
11 | (West Germany) B Bunge | 6 | 7
(United States) L Allen | 3 | 5
(Canada) M Blackwood | 7 | 7
(United Kingdom) V Wade | 6 | 5
(United States) B Jordan | 4 | 4
(United States) P Teeguarden | 6 | 6
(United States) C Reynolds | 6 | 2 | 6
5 | (Czechoslovakia) H Mandlíková | 3 | 6 | 4

Third round
11 | (West Germany) B Bunge | 6 | 2
(Canada) M Blackwood | 3 | 1^{r}
(United States) P Teeguarden | 7 | 3 | 6
(United States) C Reynolds | 5 | 6 | 8

Fourth round
11 | (West Germany) B Bunge | 6 | 6
(United States) C Reynolds | 2 | 3

=== Bottom half ===
==== Section 5 ====
First round
(Netherlands) M Mesker | 6 | 6
(United States) E Burgin | 2 | 2
(West Germany) E Pfaff | 7 | 6
Q | (Australia) E Sayers | 6 | 0
Q | (South Africa) T Harford | 6 | 6
(United States) L Antonoplis | 2 | 4
(Hungary) M Pinterová | 6 | 2
(Switzerland) C Pasquale | 7 | 6

Second round
6 | (Australia) W Turnbull | 6 | 7
(Netherlands) M Mesker | 4 | 6
(West Germany) E Pfaff | 3 | 6
(Brazil) P Medrado | 6 | 7
Q | (South Africa) E Gordon | 4 | 2
Q | (South Africa) T Harford | 6 | 6
(Switzerland) C Pasquale | 3 | 2
12 | (United States) BJ King | 6 | 6

Third round
6 | (Australia) W Turnbull | 6 | 6
(Brazil) P Medrado | 2 | 4
Q | (South Africa) T Harford | 7 | 6 | 3
12 | (United States) BJ King | 5 | 7 | 6

Fourth round
6 | (Australia) W Turnbull | 2 | 3
12 | (United States) BJ King | 6 | 6

==== Section 6 ====
First round
(United Kingdom) D Jevans | 1 | 3
(West Germany) C Kohde | 6 | 6
(United Kingdom) S Barker | 0 | 4
(United States) S Walsh | 6 | 6
(Czechoslovakia) I Budařová | 5 | 6 | 5
(United States) N Yeargin | 7 | 4 | 7
(United States) A Moulton | 3 | 6 | 6
(Czechoslovakia) H Suková | 6 | 3 | 4

Second round
14 | (United States) A Leand | 5 | 2
(West Germany) C Kohde | 7 | 6
(United States) S Walsh | 3 | 3
(South Africa) Y Vermaak | 6 | 6
(United States) K Jordan | 6 | 6
(United States) N Yeargin | 3 | 4
(United States) A Moulton | 4 | 5
3 | (United States) T Austin | 6 | 7

Third round
(West Germany) C Kohde | 4 | 6 | 9
(South Africa) Y Vermaak | 6 | 0 | 7
(United States) K Jordan | 6 | 1 | 2
3 | (United States) T Austin | 4 | 6 | 6

Fourth round
(West Germany) C Kohde | 3 | 3
3 | (United States) T Austin | 6 | 6

==== Section 7 ====
First round
(United States) S Collins | 4 | 3
(United States) K Jones | 6 | 6
(United States) K Rinaldi | 6 | 7
(United States) S Margolin | 2 | 6
(United States) V Nelson | 6 | 4 | 4
Q | (Bulgaria) M Maleeva | 2 | 6 | 6
(United States) M Louie | 6 | 3 | 5
Q | (United States) K Steinmetz | 4 | 6 | 7

Second round
7 | (United States) P Shriver | 6 | 6
(United States) K Jones | 1 | 1
(United States) K Rinaldi | 6 | 6
(United States) E Nagelsen | 2 | 3
Q | (Bulgaria) M Maleeva | 3 | 3
(United States) J Preyer | 6 | 6
Q | (United States) K Steinmetz | 2 | 3
10 | (United States) B Potter | 6 | 6

Third round
7 | (United States) P Shriver | 6 | 6
(United States) K Rinaldi | 4 | 1
(United States) J Preyer | 4 | 4
10 | (United States) B Potter | 6 | 6

Fourth round
7 | (United States) P Shriver | 2 | 4
10 | (United States) B Potter | 6 | 6

==== Section 8 ====
First round
(Switzerland) P Delhees | 6 | 6
WC | (United Kingdom) K Brasher | 4 | 2
(United States) K Sands | 1 | 3
(Italy) S Simmonds | 6 | 6
(United States) J Klitch | 6 | 3
(United States) B Hallquist | 7 | 6
(United States) A Kiyomura | 4 | 7 | 0
(United States) K Latham | 6 | 6 | 6

Second round
15 | (Romania) V Ruzici | 6 | 7
(Switzerland) P Delhees | 3 | 5
(United States) M-L Piatek | 5 | 4
(Italy) S Simmonds | 7 | 6
(United States) B Hallquist | 6 | 3
(United States) K Latham | 7 | 6
(United States) B Gerken | 0 | 4
2 | (United States) C Evert Lloyd | 6 | 6

Third round
15 | (Romania) V Ruzici | 6 | 7 | 7
(Italy) S Simmonds | 7 | 6 | 5
(United States) K Latham | 1 | 1
2 | (United States) C Evert Lloyd | 6 | 6

Fourth round
15 | (Romania) V Ruzici | 7 | 3 | 1
2 | (United States) C Evert Lloyd | 6 | 6 | 6

== See also ==
- Evert–Navratilova rivalry

| Preceded by 1982 French Open – Women's singles | Grand Slam women's singles | Succeeded by 1982 US Open – Women's singles |
