= Ron Hightower (tennis) =

American tennis player

- Full name: Ron Hightower
- Country (sports): United States
- Born: December 12, 1958 (age 66); Los Angeles, California
- Plays: Right-handed

Singles
- Career record: 7–19
- Career titles: 0
- Highest ranking: No. 97 (January 4, 1982)

Grand Slam singles results
- Australian Open: 1R (1981)
- Wimbledon: 1R (1981)

Doubles
- Career record: 28–32
- Career titles: 0
- Highest ranking: No. 98 (June 25, 1984)

Grand Slam doubles results
- US Open: 2R (1982, 1983)

Ron Hightower (born December 12, 1958) is a former professional tennis player from the United States.

== Biography ==
Hightower grew up in Los Angeles and attended the University of Arkansas on a scholarship, where he achieved All-American status.

His best individual performance on the Grand Prix circuit was a quarter-final appearance in Auckland in 1981. He also won a Challenger tournament in Kyoto that year and made it to the main draw of both the Australian Open and Wimbledon Championships. It was in doubles that he had most success in Grand Prix tournaments, with a total of five semi-finals appearances. He was a top 100 player in the double format.

He was later involved in coaching and became head coach of the University of Arkansas in 1984, a position he held for four years. During this time he was also an assistant coach with the USTA Junior Davis Cup team.

In 2006, he was inducted into the Arkansas Sports Hall of Honor. More recently, in 2019, he was inducted into the Eagle Rock Sports Hall of Fame.

Currently he runs a tennis academy in Pacific Palisades, California.

== Challenger titles ==
=== Singles: (1) ===
Year	Tournament	Surface	Opponent	Score
1981	Kyoto, Japan	Clay	(United States) Matt Doyle	7–5, 7–6
