= Chuck Willenborg =

American tennis player

- Country (sports): United States
- Born: August 6, 1964 (age 61)
- College: UCLA and Miami

Singles
- Career record: 0–1
- Highest ranking: No. 541 (Sep 9, 1985)

Chuck Willenborg (born August 6, 1964) is an American former professional tennis player.

Willenborg, younger brother of tennis player Blaine, grew up in Miami Shores.

== Tennis career ==
He won an NCAA team championship with the UCLA Bruins in 1984 and played his final two collegiate seasons at the University of Miami.

=== Professional career ===
In 1985 he turned professional and qualified for that year's Lipton Championships, losing in the first round to Shahar Perkiss.

=== Coaching career ===
He was the interim men's head coach at Pepperdine University in 1997, after the resignation of Glenn Bassett.

In 2005, Willenborg was named the head coach of the men's tennis team at Johns Hopkins University.
