= John Frawley (tennis) =

Australian tennis player

- Country (sports): Australia
- Born: 4 July 1965 (age 60) Redcliffe, Australia
- Height: 1.73 m (5 ft 8 in)
- Plays: Right-handed (one-handed backhand)
- Prize money: $289,416

Singles
- Career record: 70–90
- Career titles: 0
- Highest ranking: No. 35 (25 January 1988)

Grand Slam singles results
- Australian Open: 4R (1984, 1988)
- French Open: 3R (1984, 1985)
- Wimbledon: 1R (1985, 1988)
- US Open: 4R (1988)

Doubles
- Career record: 18–45
- Career titles: 0
- Highest ranking: No. 130 (29 April 1985)

Grand Slam doubles results
- Australian Open: 2R (1988, 1989)
- French Open: 2R (1985)
- Wimbledon: 1R (1985)

John Frawley (born 4 July 1965) is an Australian retired tennis player. He reached a career-high singles ranking of World No. 35 in January 1988.

He is the younger brother of Rod Frawley.

== Tennis career ==
=== Juniors ===
As a junior, Frawley reached the final of Wimbledon in 1983 (losing to Stefan Edberg) and won both the Wimbledon and French Open junior doubles titles with Pat Cash in 1982.

=== Pro tour ===
Frawley twice reached the fourth round of the Australian Open, defeating seeds Mike Bauer and Peter Lundgren en route.
