= 1982 Wimbledon Championships =

- Date: 21 June – 4 July
- Edition: 96th
- Category: Grand Slam
- Draw: 128S/64D/48XD
- Prize money: £593,366
- Surface: Grass
- Location: Church Road; SW19, Wimbledon, London, United Kingdom
- Venue: All England Lawn Tennis and Croquet Club

Champions

Men's singles
- (United States) Jimmy Connors

Women's singles
- (United States) Martina Navratilova

Men's doubles
- (Australia) Peter McNamara / (Australia) Paul McNamee

Women's doubles
- (United States) Martina Navratilova / (United States) Pam Shriver

Mixed doubles
- (South Africa) Kevin Curren / (United States) Anne Smith

Boys' singles
- (Australia) Pat Cash

Girls' singles
- (France) Catherine Tanvier

Boys' doubles
- (Australia) Pat Cash / (Australia) John Frawley

Girls' doubles
- (United States) Penny Barg / (United States) Beth Herr
- Wimbledon Championships

The 1982 Wimbledon Championships was a tennis tournament played on grass courts at the All England Lawn Tennis and Croquet Club in Wimbledon, London in the United Kingdom. The tournament ran from 21 June until 4 July. It was the 96th staging of the Wimbledon Championships, and the second Grand Slam tennis event of 1982.

The championships saw the inauguration of a junior doubles' tournament for both boys and girls. Future singles champion Pat Cash triumphed in both the boys' singles and doubles.

== Prize money ==
The total prize money for 1982 championships was £593,366. The winner of the men's title earned £41,664 while the women's singles champion earned £37,500.

Event	W	F	SF	QF	Round of 16	Round of 32	Round of 64	Round of 128
Men's singles	£41,667	£20,833	£10,417	£5,278	£3,056	£1,667	£972	£556
Women's singles	£37,500	£18,875	£9,125	£4,222	£2,445	£1,300	£755	£428
Men's doubles *	£16,666	£8,834	£4,166	£1,666	£834	£278	£140	—N/a
Women's doubles *	£14,450	£7,226	£3,332	£1,332	£620	£200	£100	—N/a
Mixed doubles *	£6,750	£3,400	£1,700	£800	£400	£0	£0	—N/a

_{* per team}

== Champions ==
=== Seniors ===
==== Men's singles ====
(United States) Jimmy Connors defeated (United States) John McEnroe, 3–6, 6–3, 6–7^{(2–7)}, 7–6^{(7–5)}, 6–4

- It was Connors's 6th career Grand Slam title and his 2nd and last Wimbledon title.

==== Women's singles ====
(United States) Martina Navratilova defeated (United States) Chris Evert Lloyd, 6–1, 3–6, 6–2

- It was Navratilova's 15th career Grand Slam title and her 3rd Wimbledon title.

==== Men's doubles ====
(Australia) Peter McNamara / (Australia) Paul McNamee defeated (United States) Peter Fleming / (United States) John McEnroe, 6–3, 6–2

- It was McNamara's 3rd and last career Grand Slam title and his 2nd Wimbledon title. It was McNamee's 3rd career Grand Slam title and his 2nd and last Wimbledon title.

==== Women's doubles ====
(United States) Martina Navratilova / (United States) Pam Shriver defeated (United States) Kathy Jordan / (United States) Anne Smith, 6–4, 6–1

- It was Navratilova's 16th career Grand Slam title and her 7th Wimbledon title. It was Shriver's 2nd career Grand Slam title and her 2nd Wimbledon title.

==== Mixed doubles ====
(South Africa) Kevin Curren / (United States) Anne Smith defeated (United Kingdom) John Lloyd / (Australia) Wendy Turnbull, 2–6, 6–3, 7–5

- It was Curren's 2nd career Grand Slam title and his only Wimbledon title. It was Smith's 8th career Grand Slam title and her 2nd Wimbledon title.

=== Juniors ===
==== Boys' singles ====
(Australia) Pat Cash defeated (Sweden) Henrik Sundström, 6–4, 6–7^{(5–7)}, 6–3

==== Girls' singles ====
(France) Catherine Tanvier defeated (Czechoslovakia) Helena Suková, 6–2, 7–5

==== Boys' doubles ====
(Australia) Pat Cash / (Australia) John Frawley defeated (United States) Rick Leach / (United States) John Ross, 6–3, 6–4

==== Girls' doubles ====
(United States) Penny Barg / (United States) Beth Herr defeated (United States) Barbara Gerken / (United States) Gretchen Rush, 6–1, 6–4

== Singles seeds ==
=== Men's singles ===
1. (United States) John McEnroe (final, lost to Jimmy Connors)
2. (United States) Jimmy Connors (champion)
3. (United States) Vitas Gerulaitis (quarterfinals, lost to Mark Edmondson)
4. (United States) Sandy Mayer (third round, lost to Tim Mayotte)
5. (South Africa) Johan Kriek (quarterfinals, lost to John McEnroe)
6. (United States) Gene Mayer (quarterfinals, lost to Jimmy Connors)
7. (Sweden) Mats Wilander (fourth round, lost to Brian Teacher)
8. (Australia) Peter McNamara (first round, lost to Chip Hooper)
9. (Ecuador) Andrés Gómez (first round, lost to Stan Smith)
10. (France) Yannick Noah (withdrew before the tournament began)
11. (United States) Brian Teacher (quarterfinals, lost to Tim Mayotte)
12. (Australia) Mark Edmondson (semifinals, lost to Jimmy Connors)
13. (United States) Brian Gottfried (second round, lost to Nick Saviano)
14. (United States) Roscoe Tanner (fourth round, lost to Vitas Gerulaitis)
15. (United Kingdom) Buster Mottram (fourth round, lost to Tim Mayotte)
16. (United States) Steve Denton (fourth round, lost to Gene Mayer)

=== Women's singles ===
1. (United States) Martina Navratilova (champion)
2. (United States) Chris Evert Lloyd (final, lost to Martina Navratilova)
3. (United States) Tracy Austin (quarterfinals, lost to Billie Jean King)
4. (United States) Andrea Jaeger (fourth round, lost to Anne Smith)
5. (Czechoslovakia) Hana Mandlíková (second round, lost to Candy Reynolds)
6. (Australia) Wendy Turnbull (fourth round, lost to Billie Jean King)
7. (United States) Pam Shriver (fourth round, lost to Barbara Potter)
8. (Socialist Federal Republic of Yugoslavia) Mima Jaušovec (second round, lost to JoAnne Russell)
9. (West Germany) Sylvia Hanika (fourth round, lost to JoAnne Russell)
10. (United States) Barbara Potter (quarterfinals, lost to Chris Evert Lloyd)
11. (West Germany) Bettina Bunge (semifinals, lost to Martina Navratilova)
12. (United States) Billie Jean King (semifinals, lost to Chris Evert Lloyd)
13. (United States) Anne Smith (quarterfinals, lost to Bettina Bunge)
14. (United States) Andrea Leand (second round, lost to Claudia Kohde)
15. (Romania) Virginia Ruzici (fourth round, lost to Chris Evert Lloyd)
16. (Australia) Evonne Goolagong Cawley (second round, lost to Zina Garrison)

Preceded by 1982 French Open	Grand Slams	Succeeded by 1982 US Open
