= 1980 Australian Open – Women's singles qualifying =

Women's singles qualifying
- 1980 Australian Open

Events
Singles	men	women		boys	girls
Doubles	men	women	mixed	boys	girls
WC Singles	men	women	quad
WC Doubles	men	women	quad
Legends	men	women	mixed

Qualification
Singles	men	women
- Australian Open

This article displays the qualifying draw for women's singles at the 1980 Australian Open.

== Seeds ==
1. (France) Marie-Christine Calleja (qualified)
2. (New Zealand) Judy Connor (first round)
3. (United States) Jane Preyer (first round)
4. (Netherlands) Karin Moos (first round)
5. (Australia) Kerryn Pratt (qualified)
6. (Australia) Brenda Catton (qualified)
7. (Australia) Kym Ruddell (qualifying competition)
8. (Australia) Cathy Griffiths (qualifying competition)

== Qualifiers ==
1. (France) Marie-Christine Calleja
2. (Australia) Brenda Catton
3. (Australia) Miranda Yates
4. (Australia) Helen Gourlay
5. (Australia) Kerryn Pratt
6. (Australia) Linda Cassell
7. (New Zealand) Chris Newton
8. (France) Gail Chanfreau

== Qualifying draw ==
Key

- Q = Qualifier
- WC = Wild card
- LL = Lucky loser
- Alt = Alternate
- ITF = ITF entry
- PR = Protected ranking
- SR = Special ranking
- SE = Special exempt
- JE = Junior exempt
- JR = Junior Accelerator Programme entrant
- CO = College Accelerator Programme entrant
- NG = Next Gen Accelerator Program entrant
- w/o = Walkover
- r = Retired
- d = Defaulted

=== First qualifier ===
First round
1	(France) Marie-Christine Calleja	6	6
(Australia) Merrilyn Robinson	4	3
(France) Sophie Amiach	6	6
(Australia) Jackie Pinto	2	2

Qualifying competition
1	(France) Marie-Christine Calleja	3	7	6
(France) Sophie Amiach	6	6	3

=== Second qualifier ===
First round
(Australia) Helen Luscombe	1	0
(United States) Jean Nachand	6	6
(Australia) Elizabeth Minter	6	3
6	(Australia) Brenda Catton	7	6

Qualifying competition
(United States) Jean Nachand	2	4
6	(Australia) Brenda Catton	6	6

=== Third qualifier ===
First round
3	(United States) Jane Preyer	3	4
(France) Catherine Tanvier	6	6
(Australia) Miranda Yates	6	6
(Australia) Julie Peters	1	3

Qualifying competition
(France) Catherine Tanvier	6	6	1
(Australia) Miranda Yates	7	3	6

=== Fourth qualifier ===
First round
(France) Sylvie Gardette	0	2
(Australia) Helen Gourlay	6	6
(Australia) Karen Denman	6	4	6
8	(Australia) Cathy Griffiths	4	6	7

Qualifying competition
(Australia) Helen Gourlay	6	6
8	(Australia) Cathy Griffiths	2	3

=== Fifth qualifier ===
First round
5	(Australia) Kerryn Pratt	6	6
(Australia) Sharon Hodgkin	4	3
(Australia) Rebecca Bryant	2	6	6
(Australia) Kathy Mantle	6	2	3

Qualifying competition
5	(Australia) Kerryn Pratt	6	6
(Australia) Rebecca Bryant	2	1

=== Sixth qualifier ===
First round
(Australia) Gwen Warnock	6	6	2
(Australia) Linda Cassell	4	7	6
(Australia) Annette Gulley	6	3	6
4	(Netherlands) Karin Moos	4	6	4

Qualifying competition
(Australia) Linda Cassell	6	6
(Australia) Annette Gulley	3	0

=== Seventh qualifier ===
First round
7	(Australia) Kym Ruddell	7	7
(Australia) Brenda Remilton-Ward	6	6
(New Zealand) Chris Newton	6	6
(Australia) Debbie Chesterton	1	2

Qualifying competition
7	(Australia) Kym Ruddell	0	1
(New Zealand) Chris Newton	6	6

=== Eighth qualifier ===
First round
(Australia) Jackie Monsour	3	7	0
(Australia) Kaye Hallam	6	5	6
(France) Gail Chanfreau	6	6
2	(New Zealand) Judy Connor	0	1

Qualifying competition
(Australia) Kaye Hallam	1	1
(France) Gail Chanfreau	6	6
