= 1980 Australian Open – Men's singles qualifying =

Men's singles qualifying
- 1980 Australian Open

Events
Singles	men	women		boys	girls
Doubles	men	women	mixed	boys	girls
WC Singles	men	women	quad
WC Doubles	men	women	quad
Legends	men	women	mixed

Qualification
Singles	men	women
- Australian Open

This article displays the qualifying draw for men's singles at the 1980 Australian Open.

== Seeds ==
1. (United States) Rick Fisher (first round)
2. (Australia) Wayne Hampson (first round)
3. (Australia) Brad Guan (second round)
4. (Australia) Chris Johnstone (qualified)
5. (Australia) Cliff Letcher (second round)
6. (Australia) Dale Collings (second round)
7. (United States) Tom Cain (first round)
8. (United Kingdom) Jonathan Smith (qualified)
9. (Australia) John Marks (first round)
10. (United States) Bill Maze (qualifying competition)
11. (Australia) Wayne Pascoe (second round)
12. (Australia) Charlie Fancutt (qualified)
13. (Australia) Chris Kachel (qualified)
14. (United States) Jim Gurfein (second round)
15. (Australia) Craig A. Miller (first round)
16. (France) Grégoire Rafaitin (first round)

== Qualifiers ==
1. (United States) Mike Estep
2. (Australia) Chris Kachel
3. (Australia) Charlie Fancutt
4. (Australia) Chris Johnstone
5. (Australia) John Trickey
6. (United States) Scott McCain
7. (United States) Jay Lapidus
8. (United Kingdom) Jonathan Smith

== Qualifying draw ==
Key

- Q = Qualifier
- WC = Wild card
- LL = Lucky loser
- Alt = Alternate
- ITF = ITF entry
- PR = Protected ranking
- SR = Special ranking
- SE = Special exempt
- JE = Junior exempt
- JR = Junior Accelerator Programme entrant
- CO = College Accelerator Programme entrant
- NG = Next Gen Accelerator Program entrant
- w/o = Walkover
- r = Retired
- d = Defaulted

=== First qualifier ===
First round
1	(United States) Rick Fisher	3	3
(United States) Dave Siegler	6	6
(United States) Glenn Petrovic	6	6
(Australia) John McCurdy	4	4
(Australia) Bill Gilmour	4	3
(United States) Mike Estep	6	6
(Australia) Carl Limberger	6	7
16	(France) Grégoire Rafaitin	3	6

Second round
(United States) Dave Siegler	2	1
(United States) Glenn Petrovic	6	6
(United States) Mike Estep	6	6
(Australia) Carl Limberger	1	2

Qualifying competition
(United States) Glenn Petrovic	2	1
(United States) Mike Estep	6	6

=== Second qualifier ===
First round
2	(Australia) Wayne Hampson	6	4	4
(United States) Craig Edwards	2	6	6
(Australia) Peter Johnston	6	6
(United States) Glen Holroyd	4	4
(Australia) Noel Phillips	1	4
(Australia) Alvin Gardiner	6	6
(Australia) John Blizard	3	3
13	(Australia) Chris Kachel	6	6

Second round
(United States) Craig Edwards	7	7
(Australia) Peter Johnston	6	6
(Australia) Alvin Gardiner	6	3
13	(Australia) Chris Kachel	7	6

Qualifying competition
(United States) Craig Edwards	3	6	3
13	(Australia) Chris Kachel	6	3	6

=== Third qualifier ===
First round
3	(Australia) Brad Guan	6	6
(Australia) John Thorpe	1	3
(Australia) Dick Crealy	6	7
(United States) Jai DiLouie	2	5
(United States) Cary Stansbury	6	6	4
(Australia) Steve Wood	4	7	6
(Australia) Paul Dougherty	1	0
12	(Australia) Charlie Fancutt	6	6

Second round
3	(Australia) Brad Guan	2	3
(Australia) Dick Crealy	6	6
(Australia) Steve Wood	4	4
12	(Australia) Charlie Fancutt	6	6

Qualifying competition
(Australia) Dick Crealy	7	4	3
12	(Australia) Charlie Fancutt	5	6	6

=== Fourth qualifier ===
First round
4	(Australia) Chris Johnstone	6	6
(Australia) Peter Mallett	4	2
(Philippines) Beeyong Sison	5	7	6
(Australia) Peter Della Vedova	7	5	2
(Australia) Andrew Cook	4	4
(Australia) Stephen Myers	6	6
(Australia) Simon Clarke	6	3	7
9	(Australia) John Marks	3	6	6

Second round
4	(Australia) Chris Johnstone	6	7
(Philippines) Beeyong Sison	4	5
(Australia) Stephen Myers	3	6	5
(Australia) Simon Clarke	6	3	7

Qualifying competition
4	(Australia) Chris Johnstone	6	7
(Australia) Simon Clarke	2	5

=== Fifth qualifier ===
First round
5	(Australia) Cliff Letcher	6	7
(Australia) Brett Edwards	3	6
(Australia) John Trickey	6	7
(United States) John Van Nostrand	3	6
(Australia) Victor Eke	4	7	2
(United States) Maurice Hunter	6	6	6
(Australia) Pat Cash	3	1
11	(Australia) Wayne Pascoe	6	6

Second round
5	(Australia) Cliff Letcher	4	7	5
(Australia) John Trickey	6	5	7
(United States) Maurice Hunter	6	6
11	(Australia) Wayne Pascoe	3	4

Qualifying competition
(Australia) John Trickey	6	7
(United States) Maurice Hunter	4	5

=== Sixth qualifier ===
First round
6	(Australia) Dale Collings	6	5	6
(Australia) Peter Doohan	3	7	3
(United States) Scott McCain	6	2
(Australia) Pat Serret	0	0^{r}
(United States) Lloyd Bourne	3	3
(United States) Steve Denton	6	6
(Australia) Ernie Ewert	4	6	6
14	(United States) Jim Gurfein	6	3	7

Second round
6	(Australia) Dale Collings	6	1
(United States) Scott McCain	7	6
(United States) Steve Denton	6	6
14	(United States) Jim Gurfein	3	3

Qualifying competition
(United States) Scott McCain	6	6	6
(United States) Steve Denton	4	7	1

=== Seventh qualifier ===
First round
7	(United States) Tom Cain	6	6	6
(Canada) Bill Cowan	7	3	7
(United States) Jay Lapidus	7	7
(Australia) Lawrence Hall	6	5
(West Germany) Christoph Zipf	2	6	6
(Australia) Peter Campbell	6	4	7
(United States) Craig Wittus	6	6	6
15	(Australia) Craig A. Miller	2	7	3

Second round
(Canada) Bill Cowan	2	2
(United States) Jay Lapidus	6	6
(Australia) Peter Campbell	6	5
(United States) Craig Wittus	7	7

Qualifying competition
(United States) Jay Lapidus	4	6	7
(United States) Craig Wittus	6	4	5

=== Eighth qualifier ===
First round
8	(United Kingdom) Jonathan Smith	6	6
(Australia) Brian Williams	4	2
(Netherlands) Paul van Min	6	6
(Australia) Hans Hansson	1	1
(United States) Ron Hightower	6	5	4
(Australia) Wally Masur	3	7	6
(United States) Hank Moravec	4	3
10	(United States) Bill Maze	6	6

Second round
8	(United Kingdom) Jonathan Smith	2	6	6
(Netherlands) Paul van Min	6	2	4
(Australia) Wally Masur	2	5
10	(United States) Bill Maze	6	7

Qualifying competition
8	(United Kingdom) Jonathan Smith	7	6
10	(United States) Bill Maze	6	2
