= 1981 Australian Open – Women's doubles =

Women's doubles
- 1981 Australian Open

Final
- Champions: (United States) Kathy Jordan (United States) Anne Smith
- Runners-up: (United States) Martina Navratilova (United States) Pam Shriver
- Score: 6–2, 7–5

Details
- Draw: 32
- Seeds: 8

Events
Singles	men	women		boys	girls
Doubles	men	women	mixed	boys	girls
WC Singles	men	women	quad
WC Doubles	men	women	quad
Legends	men	women	mixed
- Australian Open

Kathy Jordan and Anne Smith defeated the defending champion Martina Navratilova and her partner Pam Shriver in the final, 6–2, 7–5 to win the women's doubles tennis title at the 1981 Australian Open.

Betsy Nagelsen and Navratilova were the defending champions, but they competed with different partners that year, Nagelsen with Candy Reynolds and Navratilova with Shriver. Nagelsen and Reynolds lost in the first round to Chris Newton and Brenda Remilton.

== Seeds ==
Champion seeds are indicated in bold text while text in italics indicates the round in which those seeds were eliminated.

1. (United States) Martina Navratilova / (United States) Pam Shriver (final)
2. (United States) **Kathy Jordan** / (United States) **Anne Smith (champions)**
3. (United States) Rosemary Casals / (Australia) Wendy Turnbull (semifinals)
4. (United Kingdom) Sue Barker / (United States) Ann Kiyomura (semifinals)
5. (United States) Barbara Potter / (United States) Sharon Walsh (quarterfinals)
6. (South Africa) Rosalyn Fairbank / (South Africa) Tanya Harford (first round)
7. (United States) Betsy Nagelsen / (United States) Candy Reynolds (first round)
8. (United States) Andrea Jaeger / (Czechoslovakia) Hana Mandlíková (first round)

== Draw ==
Key

- Q = Qualifier
- WC = Wild card
- LL = Lucky loser
- Alt = Alternate
- ITF = ITF entry
- PR = Protected ranking
- SR = Special ranking
- SE = Special exempt
- JE = Junior exempt
- JR = Junior Accelerator Programme entrant
- CO = College Accelerator Programme entrant
- NG = Next Gen Accelerator Program entrant
- w/o = Walkover
- r = Retired
- d = Defaulted

=== Final ===
Final
1	(United States) Martina Navratilova (United States) Pam Shriver	2	5
2	(United States) **Kathy Jordan** (United States) **Anne Smith**	**6**	**7**

=== Top half ===
First round
1	(United States) **M Navratilova** (United States) **P Shriver**	**6**	**6**
(Canada) M Blackwood (Australia) S Leo	3	3
(United States) L Allen (Socialist Federal Republic of Yugoslavia) M Jaušovec	2	1
(United States) **S Acker** (United States) **P Smith**	**6**	**6**
(France) S Amiach (France) C Vanier	0	1
(Australia) **D Fromholtz** (United States) **P Teeguarden**	**6**	**6**
(New Zealand) **C Newton** (Australia) **B Remilton**	**6**	**6**
7	(United States) B Nagelsen (United States) C Reynolds	0	2
4	(United Kingdom) **S Barker** (United States) **A Kiyomura**	**6**	4	**6**
(United States) M-L Piatek (United States) A White	4	**6**	3
(United Kingdom) **J Durie** (United Kingdom) **A Hobbs**	**6**	5	**7**
(Australia) E Little (Australia) S Saliba	2	**7**	5
(United States) R Blount (Switzerland) I Villiger	6^{6}	3
(Australia) **L Cassell** (Australia) **K Pratt**	**7^{8}**	**6**
(Australia) **E Goolagong Cawley** (Netherlands) **B Stöve**	**6**	**6**
6	(South Africa) R Fairbank (South Africa) T Harford	1	1

Second round
1	(United States) **M Navratilova** (United States) **P Shriver**	**6**	**6**
(United States) S Acker (United States) P Smith	4	2
(Australia) **D Fromholtz** (United States) **P Teeguarden**	**7**	**6**
(New Zealand) C Newton (Australia) B Remilton	6	4
4	(United Kingdom) **S Barker** (United States) **A Kiyomura**	6	**6**	**6**
(United Kingdom) J Durie (United Kingdom) A Hobbs	**7**	4	4
(Australia) L Cassell (Australia) K Pratt	4	3
(Australia) **E Goolagong Cawley** (Netherlands) **B Stöve**	**6**	**6**

Quarterfinals
1	(United States) **M Navratilova** (United States) **P Shriver**	**6**	**6**
(Australia) D Fromholtz (United States) P Teeguarden	3	3
4	(United Kingdom) **S Barker** (United States) **A Kiyomura**	**6**	**6**
(Australia) E Goolagong Cawley (Netherlands) B Stöve	4	1

Semifinals
1	(United States) **M Navratilova** (United States) **P Shriver**	**6**	**6**
4	(United Kingdom) S Barker (United States) A Kiyomura	3	4

=== Bottom half ===
First round
5	(United States) **B Potter** (United States) **S Walsh**	**6**	**6**
(United States) C Baily (Australia) N Gregory	1	4
(West Germany) B Bunge (West Germany) C Kohde	3	**6**	6^{5}
(United States) **B Gadusek** (United States) **J Preyer**	**6**	3	**7^{7}**
(Australia) **E Sayers** (Australia) **A Tobin**	**6**	**6**
(United States) D Desfor (United States) B Hallquist	3	4
(Hungary) M Pinterová (Japan) N Sato	**6**	5	1
3	(United States) **R Casals** (Australia) **W Turnbull**	4	**7**	**6**
8	(United States) **A Jaeger** (Czechoslovakia) **H Mandlíková**	**6**	4	**6**
(Netherlands) M Mesker (Czechoslovakia) K Skronská	1	**6**	3
(Czechoslovakia) **H Suková** (Czechoslovakia) **R Tomanová**	**6**	4	**6**
(Australia) D Freeman (Australia) P Whytcross	4	**6**	4
(West Germany) E Pfaff (France) C Tanvier	2	4
(Australia) **C O'Neil** (Sweden) **M Wikstedt**	**6**	**6**
(Australia) B Catton (Australia) K Gulley	1	1
2	(United States) **K Jordan** (United States) **A Smith**	**6**	**6**

Second round
5	(United States) **B Potter** (United States) **S Walsh**	**6**	4	**6**
(United States) B Gadusek (United States) J Preyer	2	**6**	4
(Australia) E Sayers (Australia) A Tobin	4	3
3	(United States) **R Casals** (Australia) **W Turnbull**	**6**	**6**
8	(United States) A Jaeger (Czechoslovakia) H Mandlíková	**6**	5	5
(Czechoslovakia) **H Suková** (Czechoslovakia) **R Tomanová**	4	**7**	**7**
(Australia) C O'Neil (Sweden) M Wikstedt	2	3
2	(United States) **K Jordan** (United States) **A Smith**	**6**	**6**

Quarterfinals
5	(United States) B Potter (United States) S Walsh	**6**	6	1
3	(United States) **R Casals** (Australia) **W Turnbull**	4	**7**	**6**
(Czechoslovakia) H Suková (Czechoslovakia) R Tomanová	6	1
2	(United States) **K Jordan** (United States) **A Smith**	**7**	**6**

Semifinals
3	(United States) R Casals (Australia) W Turnbull	4	**7**	4
2	(United States) **K Jordan** (United States) **A Smith**	**6**	5	**6**
