= 1983 French Open – Women's doubles =

Women's doubles
- 1983 French Open

Final
- Champion: (South Africa) Rosalyn Fairbank (United States) Candy Reynolds
- Runner-up: (United States) Kathy Jordan (United States) Anne Smith
- Score: 5–7, 7–5, 6–2

Details
- Draw: 64
- Seeds: 16

Events
Singles	men	women		boys	girls
Doubles	men	women	mixed	boys	girls
WC Singles	men	women	quad
WC Doubles	men	women	quad
Legends	−45	45+	women
← 1982 ·	French Open	· 1984 →

Martina Navratilova and Anne Smith were the defending champions, but Navratilova chose not to participate. Smith partnered with Kathy Jordan, but lost in the final to Rosalyn Fairbank and Candy Reynolds, 7–5, 5–7, 2–6.

== Draw ==
=== Key ===
- Q = Qualifier
- WC = Wild card
- LL = Lucky loser
- Alt = Alternate
- SE = Special exempt
- PR = Protected ranking
- ITF = ITF entry
- JE = Junior exempt
- w/o = Walkover
- r = Retired
- d = Defaulted
- SR = Special ranking

=== Finals ===
Quarterfinals
(United States) Susan Mascarin (United States) Alycia Moulton	1	6	3
8	(South Africa) Rosalyn Fairbank (United States) Candy Reynolds	6	4	6
4	(United Kingdom) Jo Durie (United Kingdom) Anne Hobbs	6	6
5	(West Germany) Claudia Kohde-Kilsch (West Germany) Eva Pfaff	4	1
6	(Argentina) Ivanna Madruga-Osses (France) Catherine Tanvier	6	6
3	(United States) Rosie Casals (Australia) Wendy Turnbull	1	1
7	(Czechoslovakia) Hana Mandlíková (Romania) Virginia Ruzici	2	6	2
2	(United States) Kathy Jordan (United States) Anne Smith	6	3	6

Semifinals
8	(South Africa) Rosalyn Fairbank (United States) Candy Reynolds	6	6
4	(United Kingdom) Jo Durie (United Kingdom) Anne Hobbs	3	2
6	(Argentina) Ivanna Madruga-Osses (France) Catherine Tanvier	2	6	2
2	(United States) Kathy Jordan (United States) Anne Smith	6	3	6

Final
8	(South Africa) Rosalyn Fairbank (United States) Candy Reynolds	5	7	6
2	(United States) Kathy Jordan (United States) Anne Smith	7	5	2

=== Top half ===
==== Section 1 ====
First round
Alt	(Bulgaria) M Maleeva (United States) M Torres	7	3	4
(United States) K Latham (United States) K Steinmetz	5	6	6
(United States) S Mascarin (United States) A Moulton	6	6
(Peru) L Arraya (Argentina) E Longo	2	3
(Australia) E Cawley (United States) P Teeguarden	6	6
(United States) A Leand (United States) M-L Piatek	3	4
(Australia) C O'Neil (Australia) P Whytcross	6	7
16	(Czechoslovakia) I Budařová (Czechoslovakia) M Skuherská	0	5
8	(South Africa) R Fairbank (United States) C Reynolds	6	7
(France) S Amiach (Argentina) R Giscafré	0	5
(United Kingdom) D Jarrett (Australia) A Tobin	6	7
(Australia) S Leo (Italy) S Simmonds	3	6
(France) B Guéry (France) N Herreman	6	4	0
(Argentina) L Giussani (Spain) C Perea	3	6	6
(United States) C Benjamin (France) C Vanier	6	2	2
10	(United States) L Antonoplis (United States) B Jordan	2	6	6

Second round
(United States) K Latham (United States) K Steinmetz	6	4	4
(United States) S Mascarin (United States) A Moulton	3	6	6
(Australia) E Cawley (United States) P Teeguarden	1	6	3
(Australia) C O'Neil (Australia) P Whytcross	6	1	6
8	(South Africa) R Fairbank (United States) C Reynolds	6	4	6
(United Kingdom) D Jarrett (Australia) A Tobin	4	6	1
(Argentina) L Giussani (Spain) C Perea	4	0
10	(United States) L Antonoplis (United States) B Jordan	6	6

Third round
(United States) S Mascarin (United States) A Moulton	6	6
(Australia) C O'Neil (Australia) P Whytcross	0	3
8	(South Africa) R Fairbank (United States) C Reynolds	6	6
10	(United States) L Antonoplis (United States) B Jordan	4	1

Quarterfinals
(United States) S Mascarin (United States) A Moulton	1	6	3
8	(South Africa) R Fairbank (United States) C Reynolds	6	4	6

==== Section 2 ====
First round
4	(United Kingdom) J Durie (United Kingdom) A Hobbs	6	6
(United States) F Raschiatore (United States) S Rimes	4	1
(Italy) B Rossi (Czechoslovakia) K Skronská	6	6
(United States) S Margolin (Chile) G Ohaco	3	1
(South Korea) Lee D-h (Romania) L Romanov	6	7
(United States) S Collins (Netherlands) B Stöve	4	5
(United States) S Acker (United States) L Forood	4	5
14	(Brazil) P Medrado (Brazil) C Monteiro	6	7
11	(United States) K Horvath (South Africa) Y Vermaak	6	6
(Socialist Federal Republic of Yugoslavia) M Jaušovec (Czechoslovakia) R Tomanová	1	2
(Netherlands) M Mesker (United States) J Russell	4	6	6
(United States) T Lewis (United States) S McInerney	6	4	2
(United States) B Gadusek (United States) W White	6	6
(France) P Paradis (France) N Phan-Thanh	1	1
(Canada) C Bassett (United States) Z Garrison	7	6	2
5	(West Germany) C Kohde-Kilsch (West Germany) E Pfaff	6	7	6

Second round
4	(United Kingdom) J Durie (United Kingdom) A Hobbs	6	6
(Italy) B Rossi (Czechoslovakia) K Skronská	1	4
(South Korea) Lee D-h (Romania) L Romanov	6	6
14	(Brazil) P Medrado (Brazil) C Monteiro	3	1
11	(United States) K Horvath (South Africa) Y Vermaak	7	4	7
(Netherlands) M Mesker (United States) J Russell	5	6	5
(United States) B Gadusek (United States) W White	4	6	4
5	(West Germany) C Kohde-Kilsch (West Germany) E Pfaff	6	2	6

Third round
4	(United Kingdom) J Durie (United Kingdom) A Hobbs	4	7	6
(South Korea) Lee D-h (Romania) L Romanov	6	5	0
11	(United States) K Horvath (South Africa) Y Vermaak	4	2
5	(West Germany) C Kohde-Kilsch (West Germany) E Pfaff	6	6

Quarterfinals
4	(United Kingdom) J Durie (United Kingdom) A Hobbs	6	6
5	(West Germany) C Kohde-Kilsch (West Germany) E Pfaff	4	1

=== Bottom half ===
==== Section 3 ====
First round
6	(Argentina) I Madruga-Osses (France) C Tanvier	5	6	6
(United States) B Herr (United States) A White	7	1	4
(United States) P Casale (Italy) R Reggi	4	1
(South Africa) B Mould (Australia) E Sayers	6	6
(United States) J Klitch (Switzerland) H Strachoňová	6	4	3
(United States) A-M Fernandez (United States) N Yeargin	1	6	6
(United States) J Mundel (South Africa) R Uys	6	6	2
12	(United States) L Allen (United States) C Evert-Lloyd	7	4	6
13	(United States) A Jaeger (Czechoslovakia) H Suková	3	6
(France) C Suire (France) F Thibault	6	7
(United States) K Rinaldi (United States) L-A Thompson	5	1
(United States) P Fendick (United States) S Solomon	7	6
(Switzerland) P Delhees (Switzerland) C Jolissaint	3	4
(Australia) B Remilton (Japan) N Sato	6	6
(United States) D Gilbert (Australia) N Gregory	0	2
3	(United States) R Casals (Australia) W Turnbull	6	6

Second round
6	(Argentina) I Madruga-Osses (France) C Tanvier	6	6	7
(South Africa) B Mould (Australia) E Sayers	4	7	6
(United States) A-M Fernandez (United States) N Yeargin	6	5
12	(United States) L Allen (United States) C Evert-Lloyd	7	7
(France) C Suire (France) F Thibault	6	4	6
(United States) P Fendick (United States) S Solomon	4	6	1
(Australia) B Remilton (Japan) N Sato	2	6	4
3	(United States) R Casals (Australia) W Turnbull	6	2	6

Third round
6	(Argentina) I Madruga-Osses (France) C Tanvier	6	6
12	(United States) L Allen (United States) C Evert-Lloyd	1	4
(France) C Suire (France) F Thibault	2	2
3	(United States) R Casals (Australia) W Turnbull	6	6

Quarterfinals
6	(Argentina) I Madruga-Osses (France) C Tanvier	6	6
3	(United States) R Casals (Australia) W Turnbull	1	1

==== Section 4 ====
First round
9	(United States) A Kiyomura (United States) P Smith	6	6
(United States) L Gordon (United States) G Rush	2	0
(Czechoslovakia) Y Brzáková (Czechoslovakia) L Plchová	6	6
(Japan) E Inoue (United States) V Nelson	4	1
(United States) J Filkoff (Australia) A Minter	7	6
(Italy) P Murgo (Canada) A Walker	6	3
(United States) A Henricksson (United States) J Preyer	4	2
7	(Czechoslovakia) H Mandlíková (Romania) V Ruzici	6	6
15	(United States) B Nagelsen (United Kingdom) V Wade	6	7
(United States) R Blount (United States) J Davis	1	6
(United States) J Harrington (Peru) P Vásquez	5	6	5
(United States) A Holton (United States) K Holton	7	4	7
(United States) B Bramblett (United States) T Mochizuki	0	0
(United States) L Bonder (United States) K Sands	6	6
(West Germany) C Dries (Romania) M Romanov	0	2
2	(United States) K Jordan (United States) A Smith	6	6

Second round
9	(United States) A Kiyomura (United States) P Smith	6	6
(Czechoslovakia) Y Brzáková (Czechoslovakia) L Plchová	4	1
(United States) J Filkoff (Australia) A Minter	0	3
7	(Czechoslovakia) H Mandlíková (Romania) V Ruzici	6	6
15	(United States) B Nagelsen (United Kingdom) V Wade	6	6
(United States) A Holton (United States) K Holton	2	4
(United States) L Bonder (United States) K Sands	1	2
2	(United States) K Jordan (United States) A Smith	6	6

Third round
9	(United States) A Kiyomura (United States) P Smith	3	2
7	(Czechoslovakia) H Mandlíková (Romania) V Ruzici	6	6
15	(United States) B Nagelsen (United Kingdom) V Wade	2	7	4
2	(United States) K Jordan (United States) A Smith	6	6	6

Quarterfinals
7	(Czechoslovakia) H Mandlíková (Romania) V Ruzici	2	6	2
2	(United States) K Jordan (United States) A Smith	6	3	6
