= 1981 Australian Open – Women's singles =

Women's singles
- 1981 Australian Open

Final
- Champion: (United States) Martina Navratilova
- Runner-up: (United States) Chris Evert
- Score: 6–7^{(4–7)}, 6–4, 7–5

Details
- Draw: 56 (8 Q )
- Seeds: 14

Events
Singles	men	women		boys	girls
Doubles	men	women	mixed	boys	girls
WC Singles	men	women	quad
WC Doubles	men	women	quad
Legends	men	women	mixed
- Australian Open

Martina Navratilova defeated Chris Evert in the final, 6–7^{(4–7)}, 6–4, 7–5 to win the women's singles tennis title at the 1981 Australian Open. It was her first Australian Open singles title and third major singles title overall. Evert was attempting to complete the career Grand Slam (she would achieve the feat the following year).

Hana Mandlíková was the defending champion, but was defeated in the quarterfinals by Evert.

== Seeds ==
The seeded players are listed below. Martina Navratilova is the champion; others show the round in which they were eliminated.

1. (United States) Chris Evert (finalist)
2. (United States) Tracy Austin (quarterfinals)
3. (United States) Martina Navratilova (champion)
4. (United States) Andrea Jaeger (quarterfinals)
5. (Czechoslovakia) Hana Mandlíková (quarterfinals)
6. (United States) Pam Shriver (semifinals)
7. (Australia) Wendy Turnbull (semifinals)
8. (Australia) Evonne Goolagong (quarterfinals)
9. (United States) Barbara Potter (second round)
10. (Socialist Federal Republic of Yugoslavia) Mima Jaušovec (third round)
11. (Romania) Virginia Ruzici (first round)
12. (West Germany) Bettina Bunge (third round)
13. (United Kingdom) Sue Barker (third round)
14. (United States) Kathy Jordan (third round)

== Draw ==
=== Key ===
- Q = Qualifier
- WC = Wild card
- LL = Lucky loser
- r = Retired

=== Finals ===
Quarterfinals
1	(United States) Chris Evert	6	7
5	(Czechoslovakia) Hana Mandlíková	4	5
4	(United States) Andrea Jaeger	3	6^{10}
7	(Australia) Wendy Turnbull	6	7^{12}
8	(Australia) Evonne Goolagong	3	1
3	(United States) Martina Navratilova	6	6
6	(United States) Pam Shriver	7	7^{7}
2	(United States) Tracy Austin	5	6^{4}

Semifinals
1	(United States) Chris Evert	6	7^{7}
7	(Australia) Wendy Turnbull	4	6^{1}
3	(United States) Martina Navratilova	6	7
6	(United States) Pam Shriver	3	5

Finals
1	(United States) Chris Evert	7^{7}	4	5
3	(United States) Martina Navratilova	6^{4}	6	7

=== Earlier rounds ===
==== Section 1 ====
First round
(United States) B Gadusek	6	6
(Australia) D Fromholtz	3	1
(Netherlands) B Stöve	6	6
Q	(West Germany) H Lütten	2	4
(United States) C Reynolds	6	6
(West Germany) C Kohde-Kilsch	1	2
9	(United States) B Potter	6	6
Q	(Czechoslovakia) K Skronská	4	2
Q	(Czechoslovakia) H Suková	6	6
(United States) A Smith	4	1
(United States) N Yeargin	7	6
(United States) P Smith	6	3

Second round
1	(United States) C Evert	6	6
(United States) B Gadusek	2	1
(Netherlands) B Stöve	5	3
(United States) C Reynolds	7	6
9	(United States) B Potter	4	3
Q	(Czechoslovakia) H Suková	6	6
(United States) N Yeargin	2	3
5	(Czechoslovakia) H Mandlíková	6	6

Third round
1	(United States) C Evert	6	6
(United States) C Reynolds	4	2
Q	(Czechoslovakia) H Suková	2	1
5	(Czechoslovakia) H Mandlíková	6	6

Quarterfinals
1	(United States) C Evert	6	7
5	(Czechoslovakia) H Mandlíková	4	5

==== Section 2 ====
First round
(United Kingdom) A Hobbs	6	2	6
(Switzerland) I Villiger	1	6	2
(West Germany) E Pfaff	3	6	6
(United States) R Casals	6	4	4
(Australia) A Minter	1	3
13	(United Kingdom) S Barker	6	6
12	(West Germany) B Bunge	6	6
Q	(Australia) B Remilton	0	0
(United States) A Kiyomura	6	7
(South Africa) R Fairbank	2	5
(United States) A White	6	6
(France) C Vanier	3	3

Second round
4	(United States) A Jaeger	6	6
(United Kingdom) A Hobbs	3	1
(West Germany) E Pfaff	3	6	2
13	(United Kingdom) S Barker	6	1	6
12	(West Germany) B Bunge	6	6
(United States) A Kiyomura	0	4
(United States) A White	2	6	3
7	(Australia) W Turnbull	6	4	6

Third round
4	(United States) A Jaeger	6	7
13	(United Kingdom) S Barker	4	5
12	(West Germany) B Bunge	6	2	1
7	(Australia) W Turnbull	3	6	6

Quarterfinals
4	(United States) A Jaeger	6	7^{12}
7	(Australia) W Turnbull	3	6^{10}

==== Section 3 ====
First round
(United States) L Allen	6	6
Q	(Australia) K Gulley	1	2
(United States) S Walsh	6	7
(Hungary) M Pinterová	1	5
(Australia) N Gregory	3	3
10	(Socialist Federal Republic of Yugoslavia) M Jaušovec	6	6
14	(United States) K Jordan	4	6	6
(United States) P Teeguarden	6	3	3
(United States) B Nagelsen	7	6
(United States) M L Piatek	5	1
Q	(Australia) A Tobin	6	7
(United States) S Acker	4	5

Second round
8	(Australia) E Goolagong	5	6	6
(United States) L Allen	7	3	4
(United States) S Walsh	6	2	3
10	(Socialist Federal Republic of Yugoslavia) M Jaušovec	4	6	6
14	(United States) K Jordan	6	7
(United States) B Nagelsen	4	5
Q	(Australia) A Tobin	0	1
3	(United States) M Navratilova	6	6

Third round
8	(Australia) E Goolagong	6	6
10	(Socialist Federal Republic of Yugoslavia) M Jaušovec	3	1
14	(United States) K Jordan	5	6	2
3	(United States) M Navratilova	7	3	6

Quarterfinals
8	(Australia) E Goolagong	3	1
3	(United States) M Navratilova	6	6

==== Section 4 ====
First round
(United States) D Desfor	4	6	6
(United States) R Blount	6	1	1
(United Kingdom) J Durie	6	6
(United States) B Hallquist	4	1
(United States) L Antonoplis	6	6
11	(Romania) V Ruzici	3	4
(Canada) M Blackwood	6	6
(Czechoslovakia) R Tomanová	4	3
(Australia) S Saliba	6	3	7
Q	(France) C Tanvier	2	6	6
(Australia) S Leo	7	6
Q	(United States) K Steinmetz	6	4

Second round
6	(United States) P Shriver	6	6
(United States) D Desfor	1	2
(United Kingdom) J Durie	6	7
(United States) L Antonoplis	0	6
(Canada) M Blackwood	4	6	6
(Australia) S Saliba	6	3	2
(Australia) S Leo	1	1
2	(United States) T Austin	6	6

Third round
6	(United States) P Shriver	6	6
(United Kingdom) J Durie	3	2
(Canada) M Blackwood	3	5
2	(United States) T Austin	6	7

Quarterfinals
6	(United States) P Shriver	7	7^{7}
2	(United States) T Austin	5	6^{4}

== See also ==
- Evert–Navratilova rivalry

Preceded by 1981 US Open – Women's singles	Grand Slam women's singles	Succeeded by 1982 French Open – Women's singles
