= 1981 Wimbledon Championships – Women's singles qualifying =

Women's singles qualifying
- 1981 Wimbledon Championships

Events
| Singles | men | women | | boys | girls |
| Doubles | men | women | mixed | boys | girls |
| WC Singles | men | women | quad |
| WC Doubles | men | women | quad |
| Legends | men | women | seniors |

Qualification
| Singles | men | women |
| Doubles | men | women | mixed |
- Wimbledon Championships

Players who neither had high enough rankings nor received wild cards to enter the main draw of the annual Wimbledon Tennis Championships participated in a qualifying tournament held one week before the event.

== Qualifiers ==
1. (Netherlands) Marcella Mesker
2. (Switzerland) Claudia Pasquale
3. (South Africa) Elizabeth Gordon
4. (Australia) Chris O'Neil
5. (Switzerland) Christianne Jolissaint
6. (Australia) Elizabeth Little
7. (Sweden) Mimmi Wikstedt
8. (Brazil) Gláucia Langela

== Lucky losers ==
1. (South Africa) Jennifer Mundel

== Qualifying draw ==
Key

- Q = Qualifier
- WC = Wild card
- LL = Lucky loser
- Alt = Alternate
- ITF = ITF entry
- PR = Protected ranking
- SR = Special ranking
- SE = Special exempt
- JE = Junior exempt
- JR = Junior Accelerator Programme entrant
- CO = College Accelerator Programme entrant
- NG = Next Gen Accelerator Program entrant
- w/o = Walkover
- r = Retired
- d = Defaulted

=== First qualifier ===
First round
1 | (Netherlands) Marcella Mesker | 6 | 6
8 | (United States) Phyllis Blackwell | 2 | 2
4 | (United Kingdom) Annabel Croft | 6 | 6
5 | (Italy) Patrizia Murgo | 1 | 1
2 | (Australia) Linda Cassell | 6 | 6
7 | (Australia) Miranda Yates | 0 | 4
3 | (United Kingdom) Lisa Pennington | 6 | 3 | 6
6 | (United States) Roberta McCallum | 2 | 6 | 2

Second round
(Netherlands) Marcella Mesker | 7 | 6
(United Kingdom) Annabel Croft | 6 | 2
(Australia) Linda Cassell | 6 | 7
(United Kingdom) Lisa Pennington | 3 | 5

Qualifying competition
(Netherlands) Marcella Mesker | 6 | 6
(Australia) Linda Cassell | 3 | 3

=== Second qualifier ===
First round
1 | (Switzerland) Claudia Pasquale | 6 | 2 | 8
8 | (Australia) Brenda Catton | 2 | 6 | 6
4 | (Japan) Naoko Sato | 4 | 6 | 6
5 | (South Africa) Beverly Mould | 6 | 4 | 4
2 | (United States) Jane Stratton | 6 | 6
7 | (Socialist Federal Republic of Yugoslavia) Renata Šašak | 3 | 3
3 | (United States) Aleida Spex | 6 | 6
6 | (United Kingdom) Amanda Brown | 1 | 4

Second round
(Switzerland) Claudia Pasquale | 3 | 7 | 8
(Japan) Naoko Sato | 6 | 6 | 6
(United States) Jane Stratton | 6 | 6
(United States) Aleida Spex | 0 | 2

Qualifying competition
(Switzerland) Claudia Pasquale | 6 | 6
(United States) Jane Stratton | 2 | 3

=== Third qualifier ===
First round
1 | (South Africa) Elizabeth Gordon | 4 | 6 | 7
8 | (Italy) Barbara Rossi | 6 | 4 | 5
4 | (United Kingdom) Sally Reeves | 6 | 6
5 | (Canada) Angela Walker | 2 | 1
2 | (South Africa) Jennifer Mundel | 6 | 6
7 | (United States) Betsy Blaney | 2 | 0
3 | (United States) Sheila McInerney | 6 | 6
6 | (United Kingdom) Belinda Thompson | 2 | 2

Second round
(South Africa) Elizabeth Gordon | 6 | 6
(United Kingdom) Sally Reeves | 2 | 1
(South Africa) Jennifer Mundel | 6 | 6
(United States) Sheila McInerney | 3 | 1

Qualifying competition
(South Africa) Elizabeth Gordon | 6 | 6
(South Africa) Jennifer Mundel | 1 | 1

=== Fourth qualifier ===
First round
1 | (Australia) Chris O'Neil | 6 | 6
8 | (Switzerland) Karin Stampfli | 3 | 0
4 | (Netherlands) Mariëtte Pakker | 2 | 6 | 6
5 | (Australia) Pam Whytcross | 6 | 4 | 4
2 | (United States) Jane Preyer | 6 | 6
7 | (Peru) Pilar Vásquez | 0 | 1
3 | (United States) Heather Ludloff | 6 | 6
6 | (United States) Diane Morrison | 4 | 2

Second round
(Australia) Chris O'Neil | 6 | 7
(Netherlands) Mariëtte Pakker | 2 | 5
(United States) Jane Preyer | 6 | 3 | 6
(United States) Heather Ludloff | 4 | 6 | 2

Qualifying competition
(Australia) Chris O'Neil | 6 | 3 | 6
(United States) Jane Preyer | 3 | 6 | 3

=== Fifth qualifier ===
First round
1 | (Switzerland) Christianne Jolissaint | 6 | 6
8 | (United Kingdom) Liz Jones | 1 | 3
4 | (South Africa) Rene Uys | 6 | 6
5 | (Netherlands) Nanette Schutte | 3 | 1
2 | (Australia) Brenda Remilton-Ward | 7 | 6
7 | (Australia) Anne Minter | 5 | 3
3 | (United States) Elise Burgin | 6 | 6
6 | (Italy) W. Nesti | 3 | 2

Second round
(Switzerland) Christianne Jolissaint | 6 | 4 | 7
(South Africa) Rene Uys | 2 | 6 | 5
(Australia) Brenda Remilton-Ward | 6 | 3 | 6
(United States) Elise Burgin | 2 | 6 | 3

Qualifying competition
(Switzerland) Christianne Jolissaint | 6 | 6
(Australia) Brenda Remilton-Ward | 2 | 4

=== Sixth qualifier ===
First round
1 | (Australia) Elizabeth Little | 6 | 6
8 | (Italy) Sabina Simmonds | 1 | 1
4 | (France) Sophie Amiach | 6 | 6
5 | (France) Caroline Franch | 2 | 1
2 | (Netherlands) Marianne van der Torre | 6 | 6
7 | (Argentina) Adriana Villagrán | 3 | 0
3 | (Australia) Kerryn Pratt | 6 | 6
6 | (United Kingdom) Sara Gomer | 2 | 2

Second round
(Australia) Elizabeth Little | 7 | 6
(France) Sophie Amiach | 6 | 1
(Netherlands) Marianne van der Torre | 6 | 3 | 6
(Australia) Kerryn Pratt | 2 | 6 | 3

Qualifying competition
(Australia) Elizabeth Little | 6 | 6
(Netherlands) Marianne van der Torre | 2 | 4

=== Seventh qualifier ===
First round
1 | (Sweden) Mimmi Wikstedt | 6 | 6
8 | (United States) Marita Redondo | 4 | 3
4 | (United States) Carol Watson | 7 | 6 | 6
5 | (France) Marie-Christine Calleja | 5 | 7 | 1
2 | (Sweden) Catrin Jexell | 7 | 6
7 | (United States) Vicki Nelson-Dunbar | 5 | 2
3 | (Hungary) Andrea Temesvári | 7 | 6
6 | (Germany) Helen Lutten | 5 | 2

Second round
(Sweden) Mimmi Wikstedt | 5 | 6 | 6
(United States) Carol Watson | 7 | 1 | 3
(Sweden) Catrin Jexell | 5 | 6 | 6
(Hungary) Andrea Temesvári | 7 | 3 | 2

Qualifying competition
(Sweden) Mimmi Wikstedt | 7 | 6
(Sweden) Catrin Jexell | 6 | 4

=== Eighth qualifier ===
First round
1 | (Brazil) Gláucia Langela | 6 | 6
8 | (United States) Ann Henricksson | 1 | 3
4 | (New Zealand) Chris Newton | 6 | 7
5 | (Australia) Debbie Chesterton | 2 | 6
2 | (United Kingdom) Cathy Drury | 3 | 6 | 6
7 | (United Kingdom) Linda Geeves | 6 | 2 | 2
3 | (United States) Nancy Yeargin | 6 | 2 | 6
6 | (United States) J. Godwin | 0 | 6 | 1

Second round
(Brazil) Gláucia Langela | 3 | 7 | 8
(New Zealand) Chris Newton | 6 | 6 | 6
(United Kingdom) Cathy Drury | 6 | 6
(United States) Nancy Yeargin | 3 | 4

Qualifying competition
(Brazil) Gláucia Langela | 2 | 7 | 10
(United Kingdom) Cathy Drury | 6 | 5 | 8
