= 1983 French Open – Women's singles =

Women's singles
- 1983 French Open

Final
- Champion: (United States) Chris Evert
- Runner-up: (Socialist Federal Republic of Yugoslavia) Mima Jaušovec
- Score: 6–1, 6–2

Details
- Draw: 128
- Seeds: 16

Events
Singles	men	women		boys	girls
Doubles	men	women	mixed	boys	girls
WC Singles	men	women	quad
WC Doubles	men	women	quad
Legends	−45	45+	women
- French Open

Chris Evert defeated Mima Jaušovec in the final, 6–1, 6–2 to win the women's singles tennis title at the 1983 French Open. It was her fifth French Open singles title and 15th major singles title overall.

Martina Navratilova was the defending champion, but was defeated in the fourth round by Kathy Horvath. It was her only loss for the entire year and ended a 39-match winning streak. Horvath's victory is regarded by several commentators as one of the greatest upsets in tennis history.

This was the first edition of the tournament to have a 128-player main draw in the women's singles.

This tournament marked the first major appearance of future 22-time major champion, Olympic gold medalist, and world No. 1 Steffi Graf. At 13 years, 356 days of age, she was the youngest player to compete in the main draw of a major, and won her first-round match. This also marked the final major appearance of former world No. 1 and seven-time major champion Evonne Goolagong, who reached the third round before losing to Evert.

== Seeds ==
1. (United States) Martina Navratilova (fourth round)
2. (United States) Chris Evert (champion)
3. (United States) Andrea Jaeger (semifinals)
4. (United States) Tracy Austin (quarterfinals)
5. (United States) Pam Shriver (third round)
6. (West Germany) Bettina Bunge (second round)
7. (West Germany) Sylvia Hanika (third round)
8. (Czechoslovakia) Hana Mandlíková (quarterfinals)

9. (Romania) Virginia Ruzici (third round)
10. (Hungary) Andrea Temesvári (fourth round)
11. (United States) Zina Garrison (first round)
12. (United States) Kathy Rinaldi (fourth round)
13. (United States) Bonnie Gadusek (first round)
14. (United States) Anne Smith (first round)
15. (West Germany) Claudia Kohde-Kilsch (third round)
16. (South Africa) Rosalyn Fairbank (first round)

Click on the seed number of a player to go to their draw section.

== Draw ==
Key

- Q = Qualifier
- WC = Wild card
- LL = Lucky loser
- Alt = Alternate
- ITF = ITF entry
- PR = Protected ranking
- SR = Special ranking
- SE = Special exempt
- JE = Junior exempt
- JR = Junior Accelerator Programme entrant
- CO = College Accelerator Programme entrant
- NG = Next Gen Accelerator Program entrant
- w/o = Walkover
- r = Retired
- d = Defaulted

=== Finals ===
Quarterfinals
(United States) Kathy Horvath	1	1
(Socialist Federal Republic of Yugoslavia) Mima Jaušovec	6	6
4	(United States) Tracy Austin	1	6	0
(United Kingdom) Jo Durie	6	4	6
(United States) Gretchen Rush	2	2
3	(United States) Andrea Jaeger	6	6
8	(Czechoslovakia) Hana Mandlíková	6	3	2
2	(United States) Chris Evert	4	6	6

Semifinals
(Socialist Federal Republic of Yugoslavia) Mima Jaušovec	3	7	6
(United Kingdom) Jo Durie	6	5	2
3	(United States) Andrea Jaeger	3	1
2	(United States) Chris Evert	6	6

Final
(Socialist Federal Republic of Yugoslavia) Mima Jaušovec	1	2
2	(United States) Chris Evert	6	6

=== Top half ===
==== Section 1 ====
First round
1	(United States) M Navratilova	6	6
(United States) M-L Piatek	1	1
(United States) S Acker	1	0
(Czechoslovakia) K Skronská	6	6
(France) P Paradis	5	6	3
(United States) W White	7	4	6
(United States) P Teeguarden	6	6
(Sweden) E Ekblom	3	1
Q	(United Kingdom) K Brasher	6	6	1
(Switzerland) H Strachoňová	7	1	6
(United States) K Horvath	6	6
Q	(Australia) P Whytcross	1	3
(United States) N Yeargin	1	1
Q	(Japan) E Inoue	6	6
(West Germany) C Dries	4	3
15	(West Germany) C Kohde-Kilsch	6	6

Second round
1	(United States) M Navratilova	6	6
(Czechoslovakia) K Skronská	1	1
(United States) W White	6	7
(United States) P Teeguarden	2	6
(Switzerland) H Strachoňová	3	1
(United States) K Horvath	6	6
Q	(Japan) Inoue	4	3
15	(West Germany) Kohde-Kilsch	6	6

Third round
1	(United States) M Navratilova	6	6
(United States) W White	0	3
(United States) K Horvath	6	7
15	(West Germany) C Kohde-Kilsch	4	5

Fourth round
1	(United States) M Navratilova	4	6	3
(United States) K Horvath	6	0	6

==== Section 2 ====
First round
9	(Romania) V Ruzici	6	6
(France) B Guéry	2	4
Q	(France) M-C Calleja	4	0
(United States) F Raschiatore	6	6
(France) B Simon-Glinel	1	3
(France) C Tanvier	6	6
(Australia) A Minter	1	6	6
(United States) S Solomon	6	4	3
(Canada) C Bassett	2	2
Q	(Socialist Federal Republic of Yugoslavia) S Goleš	6	6
(Socialist Federal Republic of Yugoslavia) M Jaušovec	6	6
(Argentina) L Giussani	3	4
(United States) K Sands	2	7	6
(United States) P Fendick	6	6	2
(France) N Phan-Thanh	6	2	1
7	(West Germany) S Hanika	3	6	6

Second round
9	(Romania) V Ruzici	6	6
(United States) F Raschiatore	4	3
(France) C Tanvier	7	6
(Australia) A Minter	5	1
Q	(Socialist Federal Republic of Yugoslavia) S Goleš	5	3
(Socialist Federal Republic of Yugoslavia) M Jaušovec	7	6
(United States) K Sands	1	6
7	(West Germany) S Hanika	6	7

Third round
9	(Romania) V Ruzici	3	4
(France) C Tanvier	6	6
(Socialist Federal Republic of Yugoslavia) M Jaušovec	6	6	6
7	(West Germany) S Hanika	7	4	4

Fourth round
(France) C Tanvier	3	3
(Socialist Federal Republic of Yugoslavia) M Jaušovec	6	6

==== Section 3 ====
First round
4	(United States) T Austin	6	6	6
(United States) K Latham	7	1	3
(United States) J Harrington	4	6	4
(United States) D Gilbert	6	3	6
(Italy) S Simmonds	1	2
(Switzerland) P Delhees	6	6
(United States) J Hepner	6	6
(United States) V Nelson	2	1
(United States) B Bramblett	7	1	2
(United States) P Smith	5	6	6
(United States) L Forood	2	4
(South Korea) D-h Lee	6	6
(Romania) L Romanov	7	6
(United States) B Nagelsen	5	4
(United States) K Jordan	6	6
14	(United States) A Smith	2	3

Second round
4	(United States) T Austin	6	6
(United States) D Gilbert	0	1
(Switzerland) P Delhees	6	6
(United States) J Hepner	3	1
(United States) P Smith	6	1	7
(South Korea) D-h Lee	3	6	5
(Romania) L Romanov	1	4
(United States) K Jordan	6	6

Third round
4	(United States) T Austin	6	6
(Switzerland) P Delhees	2	1
(United States) P Smith	2	3
(United States) K Jordan	6	6

Fourth round
4	(United States) T Austin	6	6
(United States) K Jordan	3	1

==== Section 4 ====
First round
12	(United States) K Rinaldi	6	6
(United States) A Leand	3	2
(South Africa) S Rollinson	6	2	4
(Australia) E Sayers	4	6	6
(Czechoslovakia) I Budařová	6	6
(West Germany) E Pfaff	2	3
(Switzerland) C Pasquale	2	6	6
(Brazil) C Monteiro	6	3	4
(United States) A Moulton	6	7
(United States) T Mochizuki	0	6
(United Kingdom) J Durie	6	6
(United States) C Reynolds	4	3
Q	(Socialist Federal Republic of Yugoslavia) R Šašak	6	6
(United Kingdom) S Gomer	1	2
(Netherlands) M Mesker	6	3	4
5	(United States) P Shriver	2	6	6

Second round
12	(United States) K Rinaldi	6	6
(Australia) E Sayers	3	3
(Czechoslovakia) I Budařová	6	7
(Switzerland) C Pasquale	4	6
(United States) A Moulton	0	3
(United Kingdom) J Durie	6	6
Q	(Socialist Federal Republic of Yugoslavia) R Šašak	6	3	3
5	(United States) P Shriver	2	6	6

Third round
12	(United States) K Rinaldi	6	6
(Czechoslovakia) I Budařová	0	1
(United Kingdom) J Durie	6
5	(United States) P Shriver	2^{r}

Fourth round
12	(United States) K Rinaldi	3	7	1
(United Kingdom) J Durie	6	5	6

=== Bottom half ===
==== Section 5 ====
First round
6	(West Germany) B Bunge	6	6
(United States) A-M Fernandez	2	0
(United States) T Phelps	3	2
(Bulgaria) M Maleeva	6	6
(United States) S Collins	6	6
(United States) J Russell	4	4
(United States) G Rush	6	6
(United States) L-A Thompson	1	3
(United States) S Mascarin	6	6
(Sweden) C Jexell	0	2
(Argentina) I Madruga-Osses	4	6	6
(South Africa) Y Vermaak	6	3	4
(United States) B Jordan	3	2
(United States) L Bonder	6	6
(United States) P Casale	6	6
11	(United States) Z Garrison	0	0

Second round
6	(West Germany) B Bunge	4	2
(Bulgaria) M Maleeva	6	6
(United States) S Collins	1	5
(United States) G Rush	6	7
(United States) S Mascarin	0	1
(Argentina) I Madruga-Osses	6	6
(United States) L Bonder	6	6
(United States) P Casale	4	3

Third round
(Bulgaria) M Maleeva	6	2
(United States) G Rush	2	6
(Argentina) I Madruga-Osses	6	6
(United States) L Bonder	3	4

Fourth round
(United States) G Rush	6	6
(Argentina) I Madruga-Osses	3	2

==== Section 6 ====
First round
13	(United States) B Gadusek	2	6
(United States) A Holton	6	7
(United States) A Henricksson	3	6	6
(Czechoslovakia) M Skuherská	6	3	2
(France) C Vanier	6	6
(United States) J Mundel	4	4
(United Kingdom) A Hobbs	6	6
(United Kingdom) V Wade	3	2
Q	(Sweden) C Karlsson	4	1
Q	(West Germany) S Graf	6	6
(Italy) R Reggi	4	3
(South Africa) B Mould	6	6
(United States) K Steinmetz	6	6
(Sweden) L Sandin	2	1
(Peru) L Arraya	5	6	0
3	(United States) A Jaeger	7	1	6

Second round
(United States) A Holton	6	6
(United States) A Henricksson	3	4
(France) C Vanier	6	3	6
(United Kingdom) A Hobbs	4	6	8
Q	(West Germany) S Graf	0	6
(South Africa) B Mould	6	7
(United States) K Steinmetz	0	1
3	(United States) A Jaeger	6	6

Third round
(United States) A Holton	2	2
(United Kingdom) A Hobbs	6	6
(South Africa) B Mould	0	6	2
3	(United States) A Jaeger	6	3	6

Fourth round
(United Kingdom) A Hobbs	2	4
3	(United States) A Jaeger	6	6

==== Section 7 ====
First round
8	(Czechoslovakia) H Mandlíková	4	7	6
(Argentina) E Longo	6	6	1
(United States) J Preyer	5	2
(United States) J Klitch	7	6
(United States) L Antonoplis	2	3
(Sweden) C Lindqvist	6	6
(Australia) C O'Neil	3	7	2
(United States) A White	6	5	6
(Czechoslovakia) R Tomanová	6	4	5
(United States) R Blount	1	6	7
(Peru) P Vásquez	2	2
(Czechoslovakia) Y Brzáková	6	6
(United States) B Herr	7	6
(Czechoslovakia) L Plchová	5	4
(France) F Thibault	0	1
10	(Hungary) A Temesvári	6	6

Second round
8	(Czechoslovakia) H Mandlíková	7	6
(United States) J Klitch	5	3
(Sweden) C Lindqvist	4	3
(United States) A White	6	6
(United States) R Blount	6	4
(Czechoslovakia) Y Brzáková	7	6
(United States) B Herr	4	1
10	(Hungary) A Temesvári	6	6

Third round
8	(Czechoslovakia) H Mandlíková	6	6
(United States) A White	0	1
(Czechoslovakia) Y Brzáková	0	3
10	(Hungary) A Temesvári	6	6

Fourth round
8	(Czechoslovakia) H Mandlíková	6	6
10	(Hungary) A Temesvári	2	1

==== Section 8 ====
First round
16	(South Africa) R Fairbank	1	5
(France) N Herreman	6	7
(United States) L Allen	3	7	5
(Italy) B Rossi	6	6	7
(France) I Vernhes	4	4
(United States) M Torres	6	6
(Czechoslovakia) H Suková	6	6
(United States) J Davis	4	4
(Australia) E Cawley	6	6
(France) C Suire	3	2
(France) S Amiach	4	5
(United States) C Benjamin	6	7
(Australia) S Leo	2	0
(Switzerland) C Jolissaint	6	6
(Brazil) P Medrado	1	2
2	(United States) C Evert	6	6

Second round
(France) N Herreman	6	7
(Italy) B Rossi	1	5
(United States) M Torres	4	5
(Czechoslovakia) H Suková	6	7
(Australia) E Cawley	6	6
(United States) C Benjamin	2	0
(Switzerland) C Jolissaint	4	2
2	(United States) C Evert	6	6

Third round
(France) N Herreman	4	2
(Czechoslovakia) H Suková	6	6
(Australia) E Cawley	2	2
2	(United States) C Evert	6	6

Fourth round
(Czechoslovakia) H Suková	2	6	3
2	(United States) C Evert	6	3	6

Preceded by 1982 Australian Open – Women's singles	Grand Slam women's singles	Succeeded by 1983 Wimbledon Championships – Women's singles
