= 1980 Australian Open – Women's doubles =

Women's doubles
- 1980 Australian Open

Final
- Champions: (United States) Betsy Nagelsen (Czechoslovakia) Martina Navratilova
- Runners-up: (United States) Ann Kiyomura (United States) Candy Reynolds
- Score: 6–4, 6–4

Details
- Draw: 28
- Seeds: 4

Events
Singles	men	women		boys	girls
Doubles	men	women	mixed	boys	girls
WC Singles	men	women	quad
WC Doubles	men	women	quad
Legends	men	women	mixed
- Australian Open

Betsy Nagelsen and Martina Navratilova defeated Ann Kiyomura and Candy Reynolds in the final, 6–4, 6–4 to win the women's doubles tennis title at the 1980 Australian Open.

Judy Chaloner and Diane Evers were the defending champions, but lost in the first round to Lee Duk-hee and Elizabeth Little.

== Seeds ==
Champion seeds are indicated in bold text while text in italics indicates the round in which those seeds were eliminated. All four seeded teams received byes into the second round.

1. (United States) Rosemary Casals / (Australia) Wendy Turnbull (semifinals)
2. (United States) Pam Shriver / (Netherlands) Betty Stöve (quarterfinals)
3. (United States) Ann Kiyomura / (United States) Candy Reynolds (final)
4. (United States) **Betsy Nagelsen** / (Czechoslovakia) **Martina Navratilova (champions)**

== Draw ==
Key

- Q = Qualifier
- WC = Wild card
- LL = Lucky loser
- Alt = Alternate
- ITF = ITF entry
- PR = Protected ranking
- SR = Special ranking
- SE = Special exempt
- JE = Junior exempt
- JR = Junior Accelerator Programme entrant
- CO = College Accelerator Programme entrant
- NG = Next Gen Accelerator Program entrant
- w/o = Walkover
- r = Retired
- d = Defaulted

=== Final ===
Final
4	(United States) **Betsy Nagelsen** (Czechoslovakia) **Martina Navratilova**	**6**	**6**
3	(United States) Ann Kiyomura (United States) Candy Reynolds	4	4

=== Top half ===
First round
(Australia) A Minter (Switzerland) H Strachoňová	5	5
(Socialist Federal Republic of Yugoslavia) **M Jaušovec** (Romania) **V Ruzici**	**7**	**7**
(South Africa) **R Fairbank** (South Africa) **T Harford**	**7**	**6**
(United States) D Desfor (United States) B Hallquist	6	4
(Netherlands) K Moos (Netherlands) N Schutte	3	**6**	6
(France) **S Amiach** (France) **C Tanvier**	**6**	3	**7**
(Switzerland) **C Jolissaint** (Netherlands) **M Mesker**	**6**	**7**
(France) G Lovera (Hungary) M Pinterová	1	6
(West Germany) **S Hanika** (West Germany) **C Kohde**	4	**6**	**7**
(Czechoslovakia) H Mandlíková (Czechoslovakia) R Tomanová	**6**	4	6
(New Zealand) J Chaloner (Australia) D Evers	1	0
(South Korea) **D-H Lee** (Australia) **E Little**	**6**	**6**

Second round
1	(United States) **R Casals** (Australia) **W Turnbull**	**6**	**7**
(Socialist Federal Republic of Yugoslavia) M Jaušovec (Romania) V Ruzici	4	5
(South Africa) R Fairbank (South Africa) T Harford	**6**	2	3
(France) **S Amiach** (France) **C Tanvier**	1	**6**	**6**
4	(United States) **B Nagelsen** (Czechoslovakia) **M Navratilova**	**6**	**7**
(Switzerland) C Jolissaint (Netherlands) M Mesker	1	6
(West Germany) **S Hanika** (West Germany) **C Kohde**	**6**	**6**
(South Korea) D-H Lee (Australia) E Little	0	3

Quarterfinals
1	(United States) **R Casals** (Australia) **W Turnbull**	**6**	**6**
(France) S Amiach (France) C Tanvier	3	1
4	(United States) **B Nagelsen** (Czechoslovakia) **M Navratilova**	**6**	**7**
(West Germany) S Hanika (West Germany) C Kohde	2	5

Semifinals
1	(United States) R Casals (Australia) W Turnbull	**6**	6	5
4	(United States) **B Nagelsen** (Czechoslovakia) **M Navratilova**	4	**7**	**7**

=== Bottom half ===
First round
(Australia) **L Cassell** (Australia) **E Sayers**	4	**6**	**6**
(Australia) N Gregory (Australia) B Remilton	**6**	3	2
(Australia) K Gulley (Australia) K Pratt	5	1
(Australia) **S Leo** (Australia) **A Tobin**	**7**	**6**
(United States) J Nachand (United States) J Preyer	5	2
(Australia) **H Gourlay** (Australia) **K Ruddell**	**7**	**6**
(United Kingdom) **S Barker** (United States) **S Walsh**	**6**	**6**
(United States) F Hutnick (United States) L Morse	3	2
(West Germany) **B Bunge** (South Africa) **G Stevens**	**6**	**6**
(United States) L Forood (United States) D Morrison	4	1
(New Zealand) C Newton (Australia) J Walker	5	1
(Australia) **S Saliba** (Australia) **P Whytcross**	**7**	**6**

Second round
(Australia) **L Cassell** (Australia) **E Sayers**	**7**	**6**
(Australia) S Leo (Australia) A Tobin	6	4
(Australia) H Gourlay (Australia) K Ruddell	2	**6**	5
3	(United States) **A Kiyomura** (United States) **C Reynolds**	**6**	2	**7**
(United Kingdom) **S Barker** (United States) **S Walsh**	**6**	**7**
(West Germany) B Bunge (South Africa) G Stevens	3	5
(Australia) S Saliba (Australia) P Whytcross	3	3
2	(United States) **P Shriver** (Netherlands) **B Stöve**	**6**	**6**

Quarterfinals
(Australia) L Cassell (Australia) E Sayers	6	**6**	1
3	(United States) **A Kiyomura** (United States) **C Reynolds**	**7**	4	**6**
(United Kingdom) **S Barker** (United States) **S Walsh**	2	**7**	**7**
2	(United States) P Shriver (Netherlands) B Stöve	**6**	6	6

Semifinals
3	(United States) **A Kiyomura** (United States) **C Reynolds**	**7**	**6**
(United Kingdom) S Barker (United States) S Walsh	5	4
