= Lisa Pennington =

British tennis player

- Country (sports): (United Kingdom) Great Britain
- Born: 20 February 1963 (age 62)
- Prize money: $13,601

Singles
- Career record: 14–51
- Highest ranking: No. 229 (7 Dec 1987)

Grand Slam singles results
- Wimbledon: Q3 (1981)

Doubles
- Career record: 1–10
- Highest ranking: No. 404 (26 Oct 1987)

Lisa Pennington (born 20 February 1963) is a British former professional tennis player.

Pennington, who was raised in Lutterworth, took up a scholarship to Mississippi State University and as a freshman in 1982 was selected to participate in the NCAA singles championships.

Following her stint in collegiate tennis she competed on the professional tour and reached a career high singles ranking of 229 in the world. She made the second round of the 1986 Brazilian Open and 1987 Argentine Open.
