= Miranda Yates =

Australian tennis player (born 1963)

- Full name: Miranda Yates-Steg
- Country (sports): Australia
- Born: 8 December 1963 (age 61)

Singles

Grand Slam singles results
- Australian Open: 1R (1980)
- Wimbledon: Q1 (1981, 1982, 1983)

Miranda Yates-Steg (born 8 December 1963) is an Australian former professional tennis player.

Active in the 1980s, Yates is a native of Melbourne and was one of Australia's top junior players, earning a position on the AIS program. She won the 1980 Australian Open girls' doubles title. In 1981, she was ranked behind only Anne Minter and Liz Sayers of the Australian players in the ITF junior singles rankings.

Yates, who played in qualifiers at Wimbledon, made the women's singles main draw of the 1980 Australian Open, where she lost her first round match to Nanette Schutte in three sets. She competed on tour in mostly satellite tournaments, before retiring and raising a family in Munich with her German husband.
