= Karin van Essen-Moos =

Dutch tennis player

- Country (sports): Netherlands
- Born: 3 March 1961 (age 64)
- Plays: Right-handed

Singles

Grand Slam singles results
- Australian Open: Q1 (1980)
- French Open: Q2 (1980)
- US Open: Q1 (1981)

Doubles

Grand Slam doubles results
- Australian Open: 1R (1980)
- US Open: 1R (1981)

Karin van Essen-Moos (born Karin Moos; 3 March 1961) is a Dutch former professional tennis player.

Moos, who won a national doubles championship in 1979, competed on the professional tour through the 1980s and featured in five ties for the Netherlands Federation Cup team. In the 1984 Federation Cup she played a World Group fixture against France and had a singles win over Marie-Christine Calleja, but the Dutch ultimately lost the tie.

== See also ==
- List of Netherlands Fed Cup team representatives
