= Amy Holton =

American tennis player

- Full name: Amy Holton Lyons
- Country (sports): United States
- Born: April 5, 1965 (age 60)
- Prize money: $88,891

Singles
- Career titles: 0

Grand Slam singles results
- French Open: 3R (1983, 1984)
- Wimbledon: 2R (1984)
- US Open: 2R (1985)

Doubles
- Career titles: 0

Grand Slam doubles results
- French Open: 2R (1983, 1986)
- Wimbledon: 1R (1983, 1984, 1985)
- US Open: 3R (1985)

Amy Holton Lyons (born April 5, 1965) is an American former professional tennis player.

== Biography ==
Holton, one of four children to Richard and Marcy, spent her early years in Dayton, Ohio before moving to Sarasota, Florida in the late 1970s. She attended Riverview High School and won a state title with the team in 1980, as well as national titles in doubles during this time with elder sister Kathy. The pair also played together professionally, including at the French Open and Wimbledon.

As a singles player, Holton was a semi-finalist at the 1983 Pittsburgh Open and twice made the French Open third round, in 1983 and 1984. At the 1984 Wimbledon Championships she played her most high-profile match when she lost in the second round to top seed Martina Navratilova.

In 1986 she was runner-up at two Virginia Slims doubles tournaments, in Perugia and Berkeley.

== WTA Tour finals ==
=== Doubles (0–2) ===
Result	W-L	Date	Tournament	Surface	Partner	Opponents	Score
Loss	0–1	Jul 1986	Perugia, Italy	Clay	(Switzerland) Csilla Bartos-Cserepy	(Netherlands) Carin Bakkum (Netherlands) Nicole Muns-Jagerman	4–6, 4–6
Loss	0–2	Jul 1986	Berkeley, United States	Hard	(South Africa) Elna Reinach	(United States) Beth Herr (United States) Alycia Moulton	1–6, 2–6
