= Béatrice Guéry =

French tennis player

- Full name: Béatrice Guéry-Besnard
- Country (sports): France
- Born: 20 August 1966 (age 58)
- Plays: Right-handed

Singles

Grand Slam singles results
- French Open: 1R (1983)

Doubles

Grand Slam doubles results
- French Open: 1R (1983)

Béatrice Guéry-Besnard (born 20 August 1966) is a French former professional tennis player.

Guéry featured as a wildcard in the singles main draw of the 1983 French Open and was beaten in the first round by the ninth-seeded Virginia Ruzici. This was her only experience at the top level and she retired from the tour at a young age due to knee injuries. She played collegiate tennis for Wake Forest University, earning All-ACC selection in 1989.
