= Brenda Catton =

Australian tennis player

- Country (sports): Australia
- Born: 4 January 1962 (age 63); Swan Hill, Victoria

Singles

Grand Slam singles results
- Australian Open: 2R (1980)
- French Open: Q1 (1980)
- Wimbledon: Q1 (1980, 1981)

Doubles

Grand Slam doubles results
- Australian Open: 1R (1979, 1981)

Brenda Catton (born 4 January 1962), now Brenda Foster, is an Australian former professional tennis player.

Catton grew up on a vineyard in the Victorian town of Woorinen and received a scholarship to the AIS in Canberra. A top-ten nationally ranked player, she had a win over Dianne Evers in the first round of the 1980 Australian Open.
