= Karen Gulley =

Australian tennis player

- Country (sports): Australia

Singles

Grand Slam singles results
- Australian Open: 2R (1980)
- French Open: 1R (1981)

Doubles

Grand Slam doubles results
- Australian Open: 1R (1977, 1979, 1980, 1981)
- French Open: 1R (1981)

Grand Slam mixed doubles results
- Wimbledon: 3R (1981)

Karen Gulley is an Australian former professional tennis player.

Gulley, an Australian hardcourt junior champion, played on the international tour in the early 1980s, featuring in main draws at the French Open and Wimbledon. She made the singles second round of the 1980 Australian Open, beating Marcie Harper. In 1981 she and Dale Collings reached the round of 16 in mixed doubles at Wimbledon.
