= Pam Shriver =

American tennis player (born 1962)

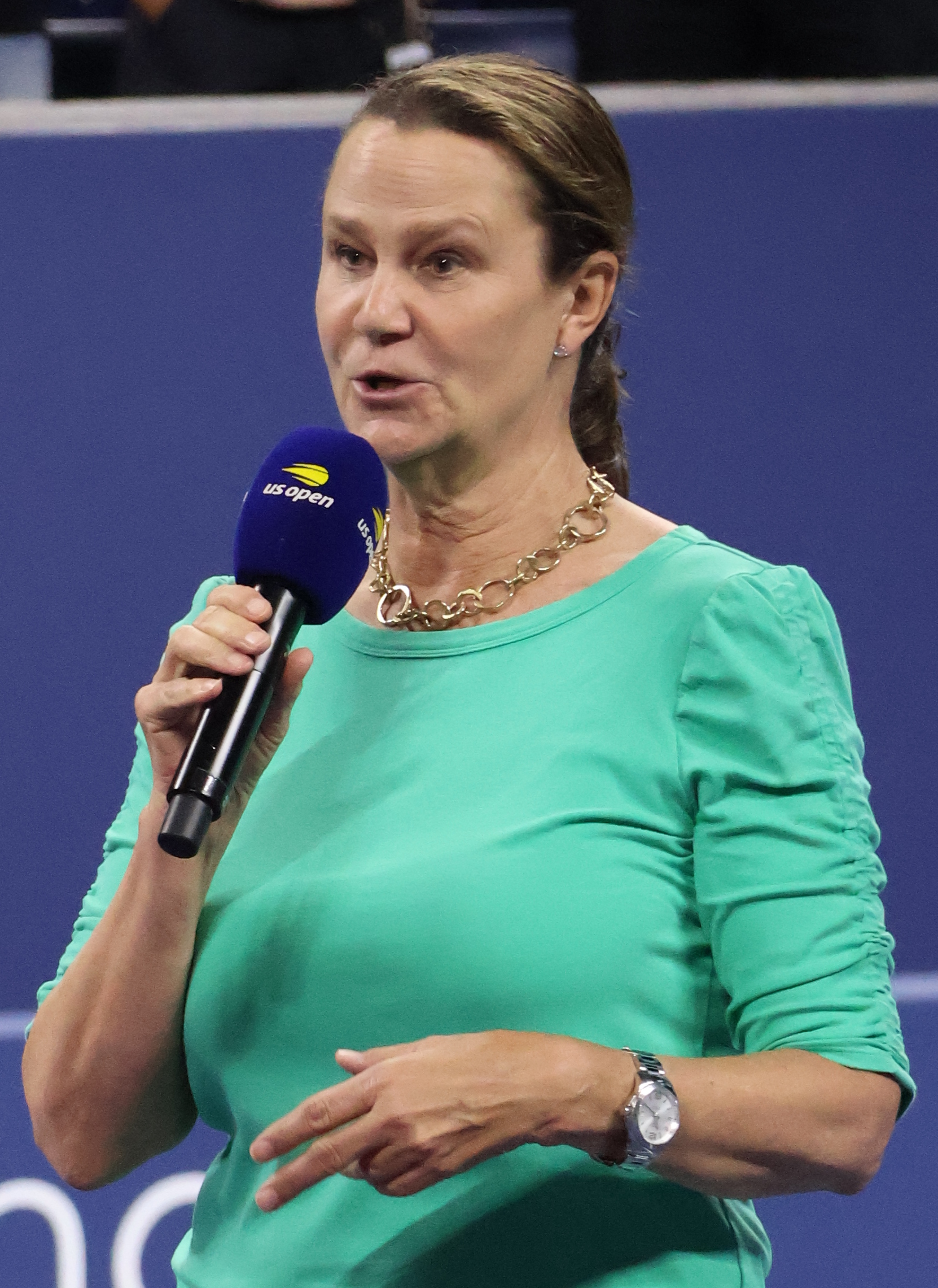
- Shriver at the 2023 US Open
- Full name: Pamela Howard Shriver
- Country (sports): United States
- Residence: Los Angeles, California, U.S.
- Born: July 4, 1962 (age 64) Baltimore, Maryland, U.S.
- Height: 6 ft 0 in (1.83 m)
- Turned pro: 1979
- Retired: 1997
- Plays: Right-handed (one-handed backhand)
- Coach: Don Candy
- Prize money: $5,460,566
- Int. Tennis HoF: 2002 (member page)

Singles
- Career record: 625–270
- Career titles: 21
- Highest ranking: No. 3 (February 20, 1984)

Grand Slam singles results
- Australian Open: SF (1981, 1982, 1983)
- French Open: 3R (1983)
- Wimbledon: SF (1981, 1987, 1988)
- US Open: F (1978)

Doubles
- Career record: 622–122
- Career titles: 111
- Highest ranking: No. 1 (March 18, 1985)

Grand Slam doubles results
- Australian Open: W (1982, 1983, 1984, 1985, 1987, 1988, 1989)
- French Open: W (1984, 1985, 1987, 1988)
- Wimbledon: W (1981, 1982, 1983, 1984, 1986)
- US Open: W (1983, 1984, 1986, 1987, 1991)

Other doubles tournaments
- Tour Finals: W (1981, 1982, 1983, 1984, 1985, 1986^{Nov}, 1987, 1988, 1989, 1991)
- Olympic Games: Gold Medal (1988)

Grand Slam mixed doubles results
- French Open: W (1987)

Team competitions
- Fed Cup: W (1986, 1989); Record: 19–1
Medal record
Representing United States
Tennis
Olympic Games
Gold medal – first place	1988 Seoul	Women's doubles
Pan American Games
Gold medal – first place	1991 Havana	Singles
Gold medal – first place	1991 Havana	Women's doubles
Gold medal – first place	1991 Havana	Mixed doubles

Pamela Howard Shriver (born July 4, 1962) is an American former professional tennis player and current tennis broadcaster, pundit, and coach. She was ranked as high as world No. 3 in singles by the Women's Tennis Association (WTA), and world No. 1 in doubles. During the 1980s and 1990s, Shriver won 133 WTA Tour-level titles: 21 in singles and 112 in doubles. This includes 22 major titles, 21 in women's doubles and one in mixed doubles, as well as an Olympic gold medal in women's doubles at the 1988 Seoul Olympics, partnering Zina Garrison. Shriver and regular doubles partner Martina Navratilova are the only women's pair to complete the Grand Slam in a calendar year, winning all four majors in 1984.

== Early life ==
Shriver was born in Baltimore, Maryland, to Sam and Margot Shriver. She first started playing tennis at the age of three. She graduated from McDonogh School in Owings Mills, Maryland.

Shriver has two sisters—Marion (d. 1997), and Eleanor. She is a fourth cousin of Maria Shriver, the former First Lady of California, niece of President John F. Kennedy and ex-wife of Arnold Schwarzenegger.

== Career ==
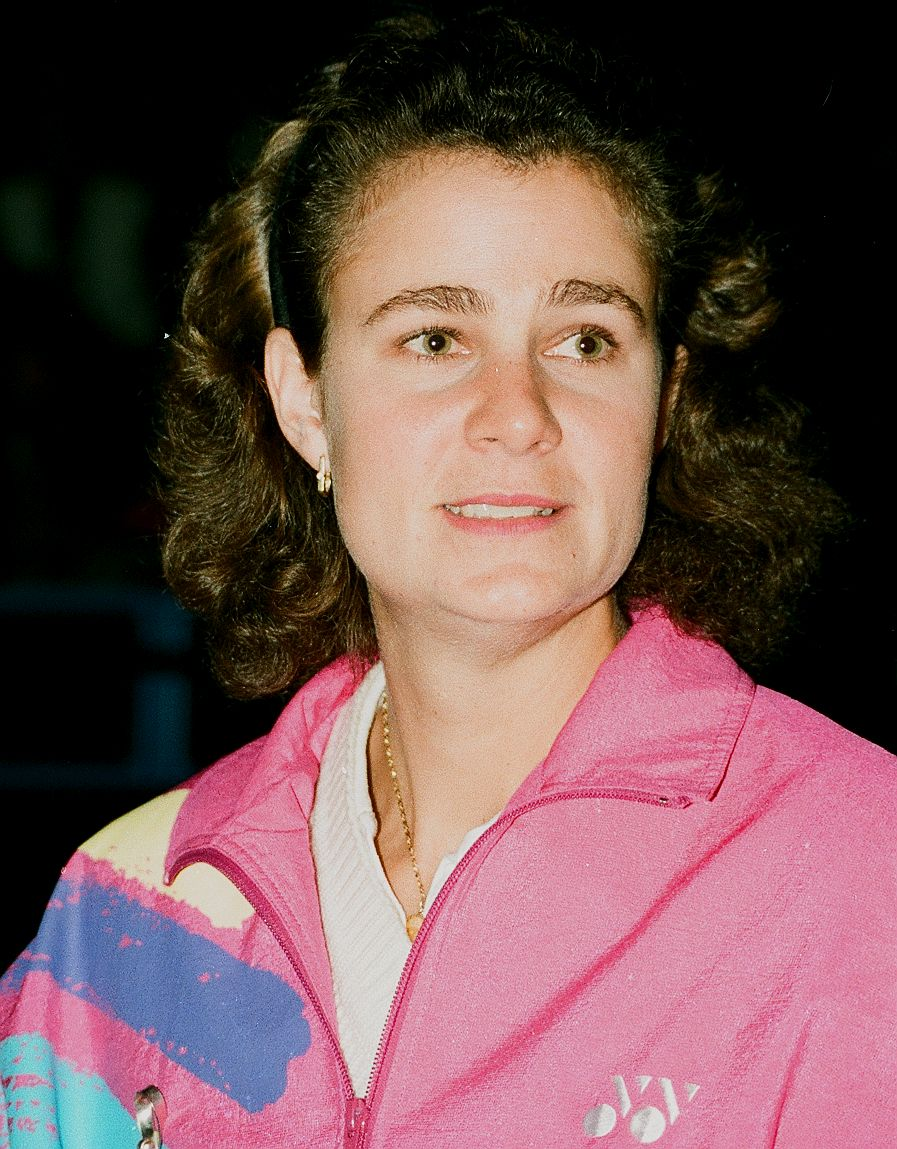
Shriver in 1994

Shriver first came to prominence at the 1978 US Open where, as a 16-year-old amateur, she reached the women's singles final. She defeated the reigning Wimbledon champion Martina Navratilova in a semifinal. Shriver then lost to Chris Evert in the final. This early singles achievement proved to be the pinnacle of her singles success. Shriver also won her first career singles title in 1978 in Columbus, Ohio and won a total of 21 singles titles between 1978 and 1997.

The 1978 US Open final was the only Grand Slam singles final of Shriver's career. She lost the next eight Grand Slam singles semifinals she played, four of them to Navratilova, two to Steffi Graf, and one each to Evert and Hana Mandlíková.

In 2022, Shriver disclosed that she had been in a multi-year inappropriate relationship with her coach, 50-year old Australian Don Candy, that started when she was a 17-year-old girl. She chose to reveal the story in part because of her concern that there are ongoing issues with young tennis players being placed in vulnerable situations.

=== Doubles ===
Shriver achieved numerous successes in doubles tournaments with Navratilova, winning 79 women's doubles titles. Shriver won 112 career doubles titles overall and is one of six female players in the Open era to have won more than 100 career titles.

Navratilova and Shriver formed one of the most successful women's doubles teams, capturing seven Australian Open, five Wimbledon, four US Open and four French Open titles. In 1984, the pair captured all four major women's doubles titles, i.e. the "Calendar Grand Slam." This was part of a record 109-match winning streak between 1983 and 1985. The pair were named the WTA Tour's "Doubles Team of the Year" eight consecutive times from 1981 through 1988 and won the WTA Tour Championships title ten times between 1981 and 1992.

Shriver won another women's doubles Grand Slam title at the US Open in 1991, partnering with Natasha Zvereva. She was also the 1987 French Open mixed doubles winner with Emilio Sánchez. She won all three gold medals (singles, women's doubles, and mixed doubles) at the 1991 Pan American Games in Havana, Cuba. Shriver also teamed with Zina Garrison to win the gold medal at the 1988 Olympics.

Shriver reached the world No. 1 doubles ranking in 1985 and held it briefly before relinquishing it again to Navratilova, her playing partner.

=== Federation Cup ===
In the Federation Cup representing the United States, Shriver won five out of five singles matches and 14 of 15 doubles matches. From 1986 to 1992, she played in 17 Federation Cup ties. She reached three finals with her compatriots, winning twice; in 1986 the U.S. defeated Czechoslovakia (3–0); in 1987 the U.S. lost to Germany (1–2); and in 1989 the U.S. defeated Spain (3–0).

=== Broadcaster ===
Shriver has provided television commentary for ABC, CBS, ESPN, and The Tennis Channel in the United States, the BBC in the United Kingdom, and the Seven Network in Australia. She has been providing coverage of various events since her 1996 retirement.

During Wimbledon 2010, James Blake admonished Shriver for criticizing him while his match was still in progress, as Shriver was in an outside commentary box and he could hear her. Shriver said she regretted responding to Blake while still on air.

== Equipment ==
Shriver was one of the first players to use an oversized racquet, manufactured by Prince.

== Playing style ==
Shriver was well known for her variety, including sharp volleys and all-round solid technique at the net. She also possessed a strong slice forehand and underspin approach, which set her apart from the rest of the women's field, but she had a comparatively weak chip backhand. She was known for being a serve-and-volleyer.

== Distinctions and honors ==
- Throughout the 1980s, Shriver was ranked among the world's top 10 in women's singles, peaking at world No. 3.
- She was elected to serve as president of the WTA Tour Players Association from 1991 to 1994.
- She has served as president of the USA Tennis Foundation and on the board of directors of the United States Tennis Association.
- She was inducted into the International Tennis Hall of Fame in 2002.
- She was awarded the Ambassador Award of Excellence by the LA Sports & Entertainment Commission in 2002.

== Personal life ==
In 2002, Shriver married actor George Lazenby, a retired actor known for his role as James Bond in the film On Her Majesty's Secret Service. She gave birth to their first child, George Samuel Lazenby, on July 12, 2004, and to twins Kaitlin Elizabeth "Kate" Lazenby and Samuel Robert "Sam" Lazenby on October 1, 2005. The family lived in Brentwood, California. In August 2008, Shriver filed for divorce from Lazenby after six years of marriage. Their divorce was finalized in May 2011.

Shriver has since reconciled with Lazenby. In 2025, she revealed that he has dementia and she was caring for him in San Diego, California.

Shriver is an ambassador for Up2Us Sports, a national non-profit organization dedicated to supporting underserved youth by providing them with coaches trained in positive youth development.

In 2021, Shriver became a supporter of the new Women's Sports Policy Working Group formed in response to President Joe Biden's executive order that mandates blanket inclusion for all transgender female athletes.

== Grand Slam performance timelines ==
Key
W	F	SF	QF	#R	RR	Q#	DNQ	A	NH

(W) winner; (F) finalist; (SF) semifinalist; (QF) quarterfinalist; (#R) rounds 4, 3, 2, 1; (RR) round-robin stage; (Q#) qualification round; (DNQ) did not qualify; (A) absent; (NH) not held; (SR) strike rate (events won / competed); (W–L) win–loss record.

=== Singles ===
Tournament	1978	1979	1980	1981	1982	1983	1984	1985	1986	1987	1988	1989	1990	1991	1992	1993	1994	1995	1996	1997	Career SR
Australian Open	A	A	QF	SF	SF	SF	QF	3R	NH	QF	4R	3R	3R	3R	3R	1R	2R	1R	1R	A	0 / 16
French Open	A	A	A	A	A	3R	A	A	A	A	A	A	A	A	A	A	1R	A	A	A	0 / 2
Wimbledon	3R	2R	4R	SF	4R	2R	QF	QF	1R	SF	SF	3R	A	3R	2R	A	3R	1R	2R	A	0 / 17
US Open	F	1R	QF	4R	SF	SF	QF	QF	QF	QF	2R	1R	A	3R	2R	1R	2R	2R	1R	A	0 / 18
SR	0 / 2	0 / 2	0 / 3	0 / 3	0 / 3	0 / 4	0 / 3	0 / 3	0 / 2	0 / 3	0 / 3	0 / 3	0 / 1	0 / 3	0 / 3	0 / 2	0 / 4	0 / 3	0 / 3		0 / 53
Career statistics
Year-end ranking	13	33	9	7	6	5	4	4	6	4	5	17	66	37	31	38	63	110	189		

=== Doubles ===
Tournament	1978	1979	1980	1981	1982	1983	1984	1985	1986	1987	1988	1989	1990	1991	1992	1993	1994	1995	1996	1997	Career SR
Australian Open	A	A	QF	F	W	W	W	W	NH	W	W	W	1R	2R	SF	F	SF	2R	1R	2R	7 / 17
French Open	A	A	A	A	A	A	W	W	A	W	W	A	A	A	A	2R	2R	A	A	A	4 / 6
Wimbledon	1R	A	QF	W	W	W	W	F	W	QF	3R	SF	A	SF	SF	SF	QF	QF	3R	1R	5 / 18
US Open	SF	3R	F	SF	SF	W	W	F	W	W	SF	F	A	W	SF	3R	3R	QF	1R	A	5 / 18
SR	0 / 2	0 / 1	0 / 3	1 / 3	2 / 3	3 / 3	4 / 4	2 / 4	2 / 2	3 / 4	2 / 4	1 / 3	0 / 1	1 / 3	0 / 3	0 / 4	0 / 4	0 / 3	0 / 3	0 / 2	21 / 53
Career statistics
Year-end ranking							2	1	2	2	2	4	92	9	7	7	12	18	91	249	

Awards
Preceded by Tracy Austin	WTA Newcomer of the Year; 1978	Succeeded by Kathy Jordan
