= Hana Mandlíková =

Czech tennis player

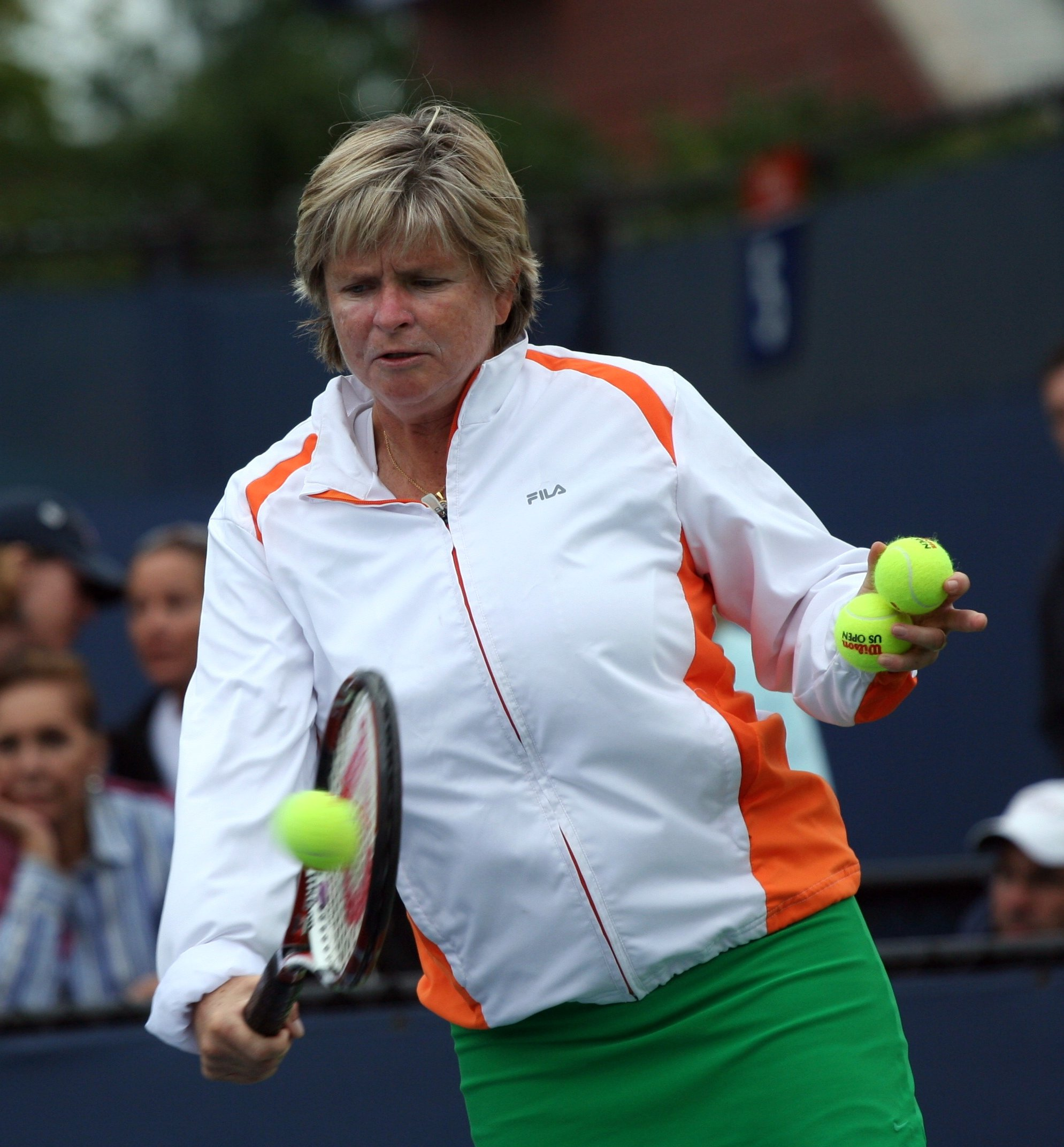
- Mandlíková in 2009
- Country (sports): Czechoslovakia; Australia
- Residence: Prague, Czech Republic & Bradenton, Florida
- Born: 19 February 1962 (age 64) Prague, Czechoslovakia
- Height: 1.73 m (5 ft 8 in)
- Turned pro: 1978
- Retired: 1990
- Plays: Right-handed (one handed-backhand)
- Prize money: $3,340,959
- Int. Tennis HoF: 1994 (member page)

Singles
- Career record: 565–194
- Career titles: 27
- Highest ranking: No. 3 (16 April 1984)

Grand Slam singles results
- Australian Open: W (1980, 1987)
- French Open: W (1981)
- Wimbledon: F (1981, 1986)
- US Open: W (1985)

Doubles
- Career record: 330–153
- Career titles: 19
- Highest ranking: No. 6 (1985)

Grand Slam doubles results
- Australian Open: QF (1987, 1988)
- French Open: F (1984)
- Wimbledon: F (1986)
- US Open: W (1989)

Other doubles tournaments
- Tour Finals: W (1986^{Mar})

Team competitions
- Fed Cup: Czechoslovakia; W (1983, 1984, 1985)
- Hopman Cup: Australia; F (1989 with Pat Cash)

Hana Mandlíková (born 19 February 1962) is a Czech–Australian former professional tennis player. She was ranked world No. 3 in women's singles by the Women's Tennis Association (WTA) in the mid-1980s. Mandlíková won 27 WTA Tour-level singles titles, including four majors: the 1980 Australian Open, 1981 French Open, 1985 US Open and 1987 Australian Open. She was the runner-up at a further four singles majors – twice at Wimbledon and twice at the US Open. She also won 19 career doubles titles, including a major in women's doubles at the 1989 US Open partnering Martina Navratilova. Competing for Czechoslovakia and later Australia, Mandlíková was one of the brightest stars of her generation and is considered one of the greatest female players of the Open Era. She was inducted into the International Tennis Hall of Fame in 1994.

Mandlíková was ranked in the top 50 for twelve consecutive seasons (1978–89), including seven seasons ranked in the top 10. She led Czechoslovakia to three consecutive Federation Cup victories from 1983 to 1985, and was only the third woman to win Grand Slam titles on grass (the Australian Open was a grass-court tournament until 1988), clay and hardcourts, joining Chris Evert and Martina Navratilova. She retired in 1990, and went on to coach Jana Novotná to the Wimbledon singles title and a career-high ranking of world No. 2. Mandlíková also served as the Czech Republic's Olympic and Fed Cup coach.

== Early life ==
Born in Prague, Mandlíková is the daughter of Vilém Mandlík, who was an Olympic 200-metre semi-finalist for Czechoslovakia at the 1956 Olympic Games in Melbourne. He also competed in the 1960 Rome Olympics.

== Career ==
=== Junior ===
Mandlíková first came to the tennis world's attention as a junior. In 1978, the International Tennis Federation launched world junior rankings, and Mandlíková became the first female world No. 1 junior.

=== Professional ===
Mandlíková captured her first Grand Slam singles title at the Australian Open in 1980, aged 18, defeating Australian Wendy Turnbull in straight sets in the final. Her second came the following year at the French Open with straight-sets wins over Chris Evert in the semifinals and West German Sylvia Hanika in the final. Mandlíková was also runner-up at the US Open in 1980 and 1982 and at Wimbledon in 1981, losing in all three finals to Evert. From the 1980 US Open through to Wimbledon 1981, she made four consecutive Grand Slam singles final appearances. Mandlíková ended Chris Evert's 72-match winning streak on clay at the 1981 French Open.

In 1983, Mandlíková led Czechoslovakia to the first of three consecutive Federation Cup titles. The following year, she defeated Martina Navratilova in three sets in the final at Oakland, California, ending Navratilova's 54-match winning streak, two short of tying the record held by Evert at the time. Navratilova then embarked on a 74-match winning streak, a record that still stands. It was in April 1984 that Mandlíková first achieved her career-high world No. 3 ranking.

At the 1985 US Open, Mandlíková became the first woman since Tracy Austin to defeat both Evert and Navratilova in the same tournament when she stopped top-seeded Evert in the semifinals and then second-seeded Navratilova in the three-set final. This victory in the final made her only the third woman, after Evert and Navratilova, to win Grand Slam titles on grass, clay and hard court.

The following year, Mandlíková teamed with Turnbull to win the women's doubles title at the WTA Tour Championships. In doing so, they defeated the top two teams at the time - Navratilova and Pam Shriver in the semifinals and Claudia Kohde-Kilsch and Helena Suková in the final. Mandlíková and Turnbull were also runners-up to Navratilova and Shriver at Wimbledon and the US Open in 1986. Mandlíková also lost in the Wimbledon singles final that year to Navratilova.

A high point of Mandlíková's European summer in 1986 was a win over Steffi Graf in the quarterfinals of the French Open. Graf had won four titles that season on clay with victories over Mandlíková, Evert, Navratilova, Kohde Kilsch, and Gabriela Sabatini, and held a match point in the second set of their quarterfinal before Mandlíková broke another winning streak. Graf had won her previous 23 matches.

In 1987, Mandlíková won her fourth and final Grand Slam singles title when she conquered Navratilova in straight sets in the final of the Australian Open. With this victory, she once again ended a Navratilova winning run, this time after 56 matches. This was the last Australian Open played on grass.

Mandlíková attained Australian citizenship in 1988, and her last consistent performance in a Grand Slam event was at the 1988 Australian Open, where, as the defending champion at the new hard court venue, she reached the quarterfinals before losing to eventual champion Graf. Injury problems Mandlíková had been experiencing for several years saw her year-end ranking for 1988 drop to 29, her lowest since 1978.

She teamed with Pat Cash to represent Australia in the first edition of the Hopman Cup, reaching the final played on New Year's Day 1989, but losing to Czechoslovakia. In September she teamed with Navratilova to win the US Open women's doubles title, defeating Shriver and Mary Joe Fernández in the final. Mandlíková ended the 1989 season ranked 14 in the world.

Ten years after her first Grand Slam victory, Mandlíková retired from the professional tennis tour in 1990 at age 28, having won 27 singles and 19 doubles titles. Her Federation Cup win-loss singles record is 34–6. Mandlíková is one of only 13 women during the Open Era to have reached the singles finals of all four Grand Slam tournaments.

During her professional career, Mandlíková was coached by former player Betty Stöve.

Mandlíková was inducted into the International Tennis Hall of Fame in 1994 and received the Hall of Fame ring in 2017.

== Grand Slam performance timelines ==
Key
W	F	SF	QF	#R	RR	Q#	DNQ	A	NH

(W) winner; (F) finalist; (SF) semifinalist; (QF) quarterfinalist; (#R) rounds 4, 3, 2, 1; (RR) round-robin stage; (Q#) qualification round; (DNQ) did not qualify; (A) absent; (NH) not held; (SR) strike rate (events won / competed); (W–L) win–loss record.

=== Singles ===
	Czechoslovakia										Australia			
Tournament	1978	1979	1980	1981	1982	1983	1984	1985	1986	1987	1988	1989	1990	Career SR
Australian Open	A	QF	W	QF	2R	2R	A	SF	NH	W	QF	4R	3R	2 / 10
French Open	2R	QF	SF	W	SF	QF	SF	QF	SF	2R	2R	1R	A	1 / 12
Wimbledon	A	4R	4R	F	2R	4R	SF	3R	F	A	3R	4R	2R	0 / 11
US Open	3R	2R	F	QF	F	QF	QF	W	4R	4R	A	3R	A	1 / 11
SR	0 / 2	0 / 4	1 / 4	1 / 4	0 / 4	0 / 4	0 / 3	1 / 4	0 / 3	1 / 3	0 / 3	0 / 4	0 / 2	4 / 44
Year-end ranking	45	17	4	5	7	9	3	3	4	5	29	14	NR	

=== Doubles ===
	Czechoslovakia										Australia			
Tournament	1978	1979	1980	1981	1982	1983	1984	1985	1986	1987	1988	1989	1990	Career SR
Australian Open	A	A	1R	2R	A	A	A	2R	NH	QF	QF	1R	1R	0 / 7
French Open	2R	QF	SF	3R	3R	QF	F	3R	SF	1R	3R	3R	A	0 / 12
Wimbledon	1R	2R	2R	A	2R	2R	QF	SF	F	A	2R	3R	A	0 / 10
US Open	A	A	3R	SF	3R	2R	3R	SF	F	3R	A	W	A	1 / 9
SR	0 / 2	0 / 2	0 / 4	0 / 3	0 / 3	0 / 3	0 / 3	0 / 4	0 / 3	0 / 3	0 / 3	1 / 4	0 / 1	1 / 38
Year-end ranking							11	6	7	12	60	17	46	

== Personal life ==
Mandlíková married Czech-born Australian restaurateur Jan Sedlak at the Old Town Hall in Prague during 1986 Federation Cup. The couple divorced two years later, shortly after Mandlíková obtained Australian citizenship.

In May 2001, she gave birth to twins Mark Vilém and Elizabeth Hana. Their father was a friend who was to have no role in their upbringing. Instead, Mandlíková brought up the children together with her partner, Liz Resseguie.
