= Linda Cassell =

Australian former professional tennis player

- Country (sports): Australia
- Born: 24 April 1962 (age 64)
- Plays: Right-handed

Grand Slam singles results
- Australian Open: 2R (1980)
- Wimbledon: Q3 (1981)
- US Open: Q1 (1981)

Grand Slam doubles results
- Australian Open: QF (1980)

Linda Cassell (born 24 April 1962) is an Australian former professional tennis player.

== Tennis career ==
Cassell was trained in Canberra at the Australian Institute of Sport but grew up in Brisbane, where she attended Lourdes Hill College. She was a girls' doubles champion at the 1979 Australian Open (with Susan Leo).

In 1980 she had her best Australian Open performance, reaching the women's singles second round and doubles quarter-finals. The following year she won two singles qualifying matches at Wimbledon, before falling in the final round.

== Religious sisterhood ==
Cassell is now a Catholic nun, having joined the Sisters of the Good Samaritan in 2007. She made her perpetual profession in St Scholastica' College chapel at Glebe Point, Sydney. Cassell attended Lourdes Hill College in Brisbane, a secondary school established in 1916 by the Sisters of the Good Samaritan. She has worked as a counsellor at Bede Polding College, Windsor, in Sydney's outer western suburbs and served on the Board of Directors of Stella Maris College, Manly in Sydney.

== Grand Slam tournaments Performance timeline ==
Key
W	F	SF	QF	#R	RR	Q#	DNQ	A	NH

(W) winner; (F) finalist; (SF) semifinalist; (QF) quarterfinalist; (#R) rounds 4, 3, 2, 1; (RR) round-robin stage; (Q#) qualification round; (DNQ) did not qualify; (A) absent; (NH) not held; (SR) strike rate (events won / competed); (W–L) win–loss record.

=== Singles ===
Tournament	1980	1981	SR	W–L	Win %
Australian Open	2R		/	–	–
French Open			/	–	–
Wimbledon		Q3	/	–	–
US Open			/	–	–
Win–loss			/	–	–

=== Doubles ===
Tournament	1980	1981	SR	W–L	Win %
Australian Open			/	–	–
French Open			/	–	–
Wimbledon			/	–	–
US Open			/	–	–
Win–loss			/	–	–
