= Scott McCain =

American tennis player

- Country (sports): United States
- Residence: Austin, Texas
- Born: January 15, 1958 (age 67); Woodland, California
- Height: 6 ft 0 in (1.83 m)
- Plays: Right-handed

Singles
- Career record: 22–48
- Career titles: 0
- Highest ranking: No. 122

Grand Slam singles results
- Australian Open: 2R (1980)
- French Open: 1R (1985)
- Wimbledon: 1R (1981,1982,1985)
- US Open: 2R (1981)

Doubles
- Career record: 35–51
- Career titles: 0
- Highest ranking: No. 102

Grand Slam doubles results
- Australian Open: 1R (1984)
- French Open: 2R (1985)
- Wimbledon: 2R (1981)
- US Open: 2R (1981,1982,1983)

Scott McCain (born January 15, 1958) is a former professional tennis player. His career lasted six years, from 1980 to 1985. He preferred grass tournaments, reaching the doubles finals at Sydney and Melbourne in 1984.

== Career ==
=== In singles ===
McCain's singles career is best known for his quarterfinals run at the 1984 Canada Masters tournament. He entered as world No. 343, and defeated Marty Davis of the United States, then world number 77, 3–6, 6–2, 6–3 in the first round. Next, he stunned Joakim Nyström of Sweden in straight sets, then world No. 17, 6–4, 6–1 in the second round. In the third round, he continued his run by defeating Van Winitsky of the United States, then ranked No. 106, 2–6, 6–1, 6–3 and finally fell to Kevin Curren of South Africa, in the quarterfinals, then ranked No. 23, 6–3, 2–6, 1–6.

McCain's greatest victories were over Raúl Ramírez at the 1981 Queens Club tournament, Wojtek Fibak, then world No. 22 in straight sets at the 1983 Forest Hills tournament, and Miloslav Mečíř at Melbourne in 1984.

His best singles Grand Slam performance came in his debut at the 1980 Australian Open, defeating John James of Australia in straight sets, but falling to Bill Scanlon of the United States in 5 sets in the second round. The following year, he would do the same at the 1981 US Open, defeating Bill Cowan of Canada, and falling again to Tim Mayotte of the United States in five sets in the second round.

=== In doubles ===
As with his singles career McCain's best doubles performances came in 1984, when he reached the finals at Melbourne and Sydney Outdoors. At Sydney, despite his ranking of 223, he and Tom Gullikson defeated four partnerships, all eight players having far superior rankings. He and Gullikson finally fell to Paul Annacone of the US and Christo van Rensburg of the Republic of South Africa. They lost a tight match 6–7, 5–7.

Later, in Melbourne, McCain partnered with Mike Bauer of the United States. Here they stormed the rankings once again, only to fall in a three-set loss to Broderick Dyke and Wally Masur, both of Australia, in the finals.
