= Brenda Remilton-Ward =

Australian tennis player

Brenda Remilton
- Full name: Brenda Remilton-Ward
- Country (sports): Australia
- Born: 24 February 1956 (age 70)
- Prize money: US$ 52,144

Singles
- Career record: 2–12

Grand Slam singles results
- Australian Open: 1R (1981)
- French Open: 3R (1981)
- Wimbledon: 1R (1982, 1983)
- US Open: 1R (1981)

Doubles
- Career record: 3–17
- Career titles: 1 WTA

Grand Slam doubles results
- Australian Open: 2R (1981)
- French Open: QF (1984)
- Wimbledon: 2R (1981)
- US Open: 2R (1981)

Grand Slam mixed doubles results
- Wimbledon: 3R (1985)

Brenda Remilton-Ward (born 24 February 1956) is an Australian former professional tennis player. She competed as Brenda Remilton, then Brenda Remilton-Ward after marriage.

== Biography ==
Remilton-Ward competed on the professional tour in the 1980s and featured in the main draw of all four grand slam tournaments during her career. She reached the third round of the 1981 French Open, registering wins over Heidi Eisterlehner and Anne Hobbs.

As a doubles player, she won one WTA Tour title, which came at Japan's Borden Classic tournament in 1982, partnering Naoko Sato. Remilton-Ward and Sato were also women's doubles quarter-finalists at the 1984 French Open, eliminated by top seeds Martina Navratilova and Pam Shriver.

== Grand Slam tournaments Performance timeline ==
Key
W	F	SF	QF	#R	RR	Q#	DNQ	A	NH

(W) winner; (F) finalist; (SF) semifinalist; (QF) quarterfinalist; (#R) rounds 4, 3, 2, 1; (RR) round-robin stage; (Q#) qualification round; (DNQ) did not qualify; (A) absent; (NH) not held; (SR) strike rate (events won / competed); (W–L) win–loss record.

=== Singles ===
Tournament	1981	1982	1983	SR	W–L	Win %
Australian Open	1R	Q2		/	–	–
French Open	3R	A		/	–	–
Wimbledon	Q3	1R	1R	/	–	–
US Open	1R	A		/	–	–
Win–loss	2–3	0–1		/	–	–

=== Doubles ===
Tournament	1980	1981	1982	1983	1984	SR	W–L	Win %
Australian Open	1R	2R				/	–	–
French Open		2R				/	–	–
Wimbledon		2R				/	–	–
US Open		2R				/	–	–
Win–loss		2–4				/	–	–

== WTA Tour finals ==
=== Doubles (1–4) ===
Result	Date	Tournament	Surface	Partner	Opponents	Score
Win	Oct 1982	Borden Classic, Tokyo, Japan	Hard	(Japan) Naoko Sato	(United States) Laura duPont (United States) Barbara Jordan	2–6, 6–3, 6–3
Loss	Oct 1982	Japan Open, Tokyo, Japan	Hard	(Japan) Naoko Sato	(United States) Laura duPont (United States) Barbara Jordan	2–6, 7–6, 1–6
Loss	Sep 1983	Salt Lake City, U.S.	Hard	(United Kingdom) Amanda Brown	(Brazil) Cláudia Monteiro (South Africa) Yvonne Vermaak	6–1, 3–6, 4–6
Loss	Sep 1983	Kansas City, U.S.	Hard	(Australia) Chris O'Neil	(Australia) Elizabeth Sayers (United States) Sandy Collins	5–7, 6–7
Loss	Oct 1983	Borden Classic, Tokyo, Japan	Hard	(Japan) Naoko Sato	(Australia) Chris O'Neil (Australia) Pam Whytcross	7–5, 6–7, 3–6
