= 1980 Australian Open – Women's singles =

Women's singles
- 1980 Australian Open

Final
- Champion: (Czechoslovakia) Hana Mandlíková
- Runner-up: (Australia) Wendy Turnbull
- Score: 6–0, 7–5

Details
- Draw: 56 (8 Q )
- Seeds: 8

Events
| Singles | men | women | | boys | girls |
| Doubles | men | women | mixed | boys | girls |
| WC Singles | men | women | quad |
| WC Doubles | men | women | quad |
| Legends | men | women | mixed |
- Australian Open

Hana Mandlíková defeated Wendy Turnbull in the final, 6–0, 7–5 to win the women's singles tennis title at the 1980 Australian Open. It was her first major singles title. The women's tournament was held from November 24th - 30th, 1980 — separately from the men's event, which began in late December and concluded the first week of 1981.

Barbara Jordan was the reigning champion, but did not compete this year.

As of 2025, this was the last time at the Australian Open where neither finalist had previously won a major; the 1998 Wimbledon Championships would be the next occurrence of such a final, a span of 63 tournaments. Turnbull was the last Australian to reach the final until Ashleigh Barty in 2022.

== Seeds ==
The seeded players are listed below. Hana Mandlíková is the champion; others show the round in which they were eliminated.

1. (United States) Martina Navratilova (semifinals)
2. (Australia) Evonne Goolagong (second round)
3. (Czechoslovakia) Hana Mandlíková (champion)
4. (Australia) Wendy Turnbull (finalist)
5. (South Africa) Greer Stevens (quarterfinals)
6. (Romania) Virginia Ruzici (quarterfinals)
7. (United States) Pam Shriver (quarterfinals)
8. (West Germany) Sylvia Hanika (third round)

== Draw ==
=== Key ===
- Q = Qualifier
- WC = Wild card
- LL = Lucky loser
- r = Retired

=== Finals ===
Quarterfinals
1 | (United States) Martina Navratilova | 4 | 6 | 7
5 | (South Africa) Greer Stevens | 6 | 1 | 6
4 | (Australia) Wendy Turnbull | 3 | 6 | 6
7 | (United States) Pam Shriver | 6 | 3 | 2
6 | (Romania) Virginia Ruzici | 1 | 6 | 4
3 | (Czechoslovakia) Hana Mandlíková | 6 | 3 | 6
(United States) Candy Reynolds | 6 | 3 | 3
(Socialist Federal Republic of Yugoslavia) Mima Jaušovec | 4 | 6 | 6

Semifinals
1 | (United States) Martina Navratilova | 4 | 5
4 | (Australia) Wendy Turnbull | 6 | 7
3 | (Czechoslovakia) Hana Mandlíková | 6 | 6
(Socialist Federal Republic of Yugoslavia) Mima Jaušovec | 4 | 1

Finals
4 | (Australia) Wendy Turnbull | 0 | 5
3 | (Czechoslovakia) Hana Mandlíková | 6 | 7

=== Earlier rounds ===
==== Section 1 ====
First round
(United States) R Blount | 6 | 6
(Netherlands) M Mesker | 1 | 3
(United States) D Morrison | 3 | 6 | 6
(United States) F Hutnick | 6 | 3 | 4
(United States) B Nagelsen | 6 | 4 | 6
(United States) R Casals | 4 | 6 | 4
(United States) L Morse | 1 | 6 | 6
Q | (France) G Lovera | 6 | 1 | 1
Q | (Australia) B Catton | 3 | 6 | 7
(Australia) D Evers | 6 | 3 | 5
(Australia) S Leo | 6 | 6
Q | (New Zealand) C Newton | 4 | 4

Second round
1 | (United States) M Navratilova | 6 | 6 | 6
(United States) R Blount | 3 | 7 | 1
(United States) D Morrison | 2 | 3
(United States) B Nagelsen | 6 | 6
(United States) L Morse | 6 | 7
Q | (Australia) B Catton | 3 | 5
(Australia) S Leo | 2 | 4
5 | (South Africa) G Stevens | 6 | 6

Third round
1 | (United States) M Navratilova | 6 | 6
(United States) B Nagelsen | 2 | 2
(United States) L Morse | 7 | 0 | 0
5 | (South Africa) G Stevens | 6 | 6 | 6

Quarterfinals
1 | (United States) M Navratilova | 4 | 6 | 7
5 | (South Africa) G Stevens | 6 | 1 | 6

==== Section 2 ====
First round
(United States) L Forood | 7 | 4 | 6
(Australia) N Gregory | 5 | 6 | 2
(United Kingdom) S Barker | 6 | 6
(West Germany) C Kohde-Kilsch | 4 | 3
(United States) D Desfor | 6 | 6 | 6
(Australia) B Randall | 4 | 7 | 3
(Netherlands) B Stöve | 6 | 1 | 6
(South Africa) R Fairbank | 1 | 6 | 2
(Australia) K Gulley | 6 | 6
(United States) M Harper | 3 | 4
(Australia) S Saliba | 4 | 7 | 6
(Switzerland) C Jolissaint | 6 | 5 | 1

Second round
4 | (Australia) W Turnbull | 6 | 6
(United States) L Forood | 2 | 3
(United Kingdom) S Barker | 6 | 6
(United States) D Desfor | 2 | 3
(Netherlands) B Stöve | 6 | 6
(Australia) K Gulley | 3 | 2
(Australia) S Saliba | 1 | 5
7 | (United States) P Shriver | 6 | 7

Third round
4 | (Australia) W Turnbull | 6 | 6
(United Kingdom) S Barker | 4 | 2
(Netherlands) B Stöve | 3 | 1
7 | (United States) P Shriver | 6 | 6

Quarterfinals
4 | (Australia) W Turnbull | 3 | 6 | 6
7 | (United States) P Shriver | 6 | 3 | 2

==== Section 3 ====
First round
Q | (Australia) L Cassell | 6 | 6
(Australia) J Walker | 3 | 3
(Hungary) M Pinterová | 6 | 6
(Australia) E Sayers | 1 | 2
(Australia) A Tobin | 7 | 6
(Switzerland) H Strachoňová | 6 | 1
Q | (Australia) K Pratt | 1 | 7 | 6
(Australia) P Whytcross | 6 | 5 | 1
(United States) B Hallquist | 6 | 7
(United States) S Walsh | 4 | 5
(Australia) E Little | 7 | 1 | 6
(South Africa) T Harford | 5 | 6 | 3

Second round
6 | (Romania) V Ruzici | 6 | 7
Q | (Australia) L Cassell | 2 | 5
(Hungary) M Pinterová | 7 | 7
(Australia) A Tobin | 5 | 5
Q | (Australia) K Pratt | 1 | 3
(United States) B Hallquist | 6 | 6
(Australia) E Little | 6 | 2
3 | (Czechoslovakia) H Mandlíková | 7 | 6

Third round
6 | (Romania) V Ruzici | 7 | 6
(Hungary) M Pinterová | 5 | 3
(United States) B Hallquist | 2 | 2
3 | (Czechoslovakia) H Mandlíková | 6 | 6

Quarterfinals
6 | (Romania) V Ruzici | 1 | 6 | 4
3 | (Czechoslovakia) H Mandlíková | 6 | 3 | 6

==== Section 4 ====
First round
(Netherlands) N Schutte | 3 | 6 | 6
Q | (Australia) M Yates | 6 | 2 | 0
(United States) C Reynolds | 6 | 7
Q | (Australia) H Gourlay | 4 | 6
(Czechoslovakia) R Tomanová | 6 | 6
Q | (France) M-C Calleja | 4 | 4
(Australia) A Minter | 3 | 6 | 6
(United States) A Kiyomura | 6 | 3 | 3
(Japan) N Sato | 6 | 6
(South Korea) Lee D-h | 2 | 3
(Socialist Federal Republic of Yugoslavia) M Jaušovec | 6 | 6
(West Germany) B Bunge | 4 | 3

Second round
8 | (West Germany) S Hanika | 6 | 6
(Netherlands) N Schutte | 0 | 1
(United States) C Reynolds | 6 | 6
(Czechoslovakia) R Tomanová | 4 | 2
(Australia) A Minter | 7 | 6
(Japan) N Sato | 5 | 0
(Socialist Federal Republic of Yugoslavia) M Jaušovec | 6 | 4 | 6
2 | (Australia) E Goolagong | 2 | 6 | 4

Third round
8 | (West Germany) S Hanika | 3 | 7 | 0
(United States) C Reynolds | 6 | 6 | 6
(Australia) A Minter | 2 | 2
(Socialist Federal Republic of Yugoslavia) M Jaušovec | 6 | 6

Quarterfinals
(United States) C Reynolds | 4 | 6 | 6
(Socialist Federal Republic of Yugoslavia) M Jaušovec | 6 | 3 | 3

| Preceded by 1980 US Open – Women's singles | Grand Slam women's singles | Succeeded by 1981 French Open – Women's singles |
