= 1980 Australian Open – Men's singles =

Men's singles
- 1980 Australian Open

Final
- Champion: (United States) Brian Teacher
- Runner-up: (Australia) Kim Warwick
- Score: 7–5, 7–6^{(7–4)}, 6–3

Details
- Draw: 64
- Seeds: 15

Events
Singles	men	women		boys	girls
Doubles	men	women	mixed	boys	girls
WC Singles	men	women	quad
WC Doubles	men	women	quad
Legends	men	women	mixed
- Australian Open

Brian Teacher defeated Kim Warwick in the final, 7–5, 7–6^{(7–4)}, 6–3 to win the men's singles tennis title at the 1980 Australian Open. It was his first and only major singles title. The men's tournament was held from late December to early January 1981 – separately from the women's event, which was already held during late November.

Guillermo Vilas was the two-time defending champion, but lost in the semifinals to Warwick.

== Seeds ==
The seeded players are listed below. Brian Teacher is the champion; others show the round in which they were eliminated.

1. (Argentina) Guillermo Vilas (semifinals)
2. (Czechoslovakia) Ivan Lendl (second round)
3. (Argentina) José Luis Clerc (second round)
4. (United States) Vitas Gerulaitis (first round)
5. (United States) Brian Gottfried (third round)
6. (United States) John Sadri (quarterfinals)
7. (United States) Victor Amaya (third round)
8. (United States) Brian Teacher (champion)
9. (France) Yannick Noah (first round)
10. (United States) Bill Scanlon (quarterfinals)
11. (Paraguay) Víctor Pecci Sr. (second round)
12. (Australia) Paul McNamee (quarterfinals)
13. (United States) Peter Fleming (first round)
14. (Australia) Kim Warwick (final)
15. (Australia) Peter McNamara (semifinals)
16. (Australia) Phil Dent (third round)

== Draw ==
=== Key ===
- Q = Qualifier
- WC = Wild card
- LL = Lucky loser
- r = Retired

=== Final eight ===
Quarterfinals
1	(Argentina) Guillermo Vilas	7	6	2	4	6
6	(United States) John Sadri	5	4	6	6	3
10	(United States) Bill Scanlon	4	2	6	1
14	(Australia) Kim Warwick	6	6	4	6
8	(United States) Brian Teacher	6	4	6	7
12	(Australia) Paul McNamee	4	6	0	6
15	(Australia) Peter McNamara	7	5	6	6	6
(United States) Peter Rennert	6	7	2	7	3

Semifinals
1	(Argentina) Guillermo Vilas	7	4	2	6	4
14	(Australia) Kim Warwick	6	6	6	2	6
8	(United States) Brian Teacher	6	7	6	6
15	(Australia) Peter McNamara	7	5	3	4

Final
14	(Australia) Kim Warwick	5	6^{4}	3
8	(United States) Brian Teacher	7	7^{7}	6

=== Section 1 ===
First round
1	(Argentina) G Vilas	7	6	6
(Australia) D Carter	6	3	4
(Australia) S Docherty	4	6	6	6	6
(New Zealand) R Simpson	6	3	7	4	4
(South Africa) K Curren	6	6	6
Q	(Australia) C Fancutt	4	3	3
11	(Paraguay) V Pecci Sr.	7	6	6	5	6
(Australia) P Kronk	6	7	3	7	4
16	(Australia) P Dent	6	6	2	7	7
(New Zealand) O Parun	7	4	6	6	6
(Israel) S Glickstein	6	3	6	6
Q	(United States) J Lapidus	0	6	3	1
(United Kingdom) J Smith	7	6	7	6
(United States) T Graham	6	7	6	1
6	(United States) J Sadri	6	6	6
Q	(Australia) C Kachel	3	3	4

Second round
1	(Argentina) G Vilas	3	6	6	7
(Australia) S Docherty	6	3	3	6
(South Africa) K Curren	6	6	6
11	(Paraguay) V Pecci Sr.	4	2	3
16	(Australia) P Dent	6	7	6	7
(Israel) S Glickstein	7	6	3	6
(United Kingdom) J Smith	6	6	1
6	(United States) J Sadri	7	1	6

Third round
1	(Argentina) G Vilas	6	6	6	6
(South Africa) K Curren	7	4	4	3
16	(Australia) P Dent	5	1	7	5
6	(United States) J Sadri	7	6	6	7

Quarterfinals
1	(Argentina) G Vilas	7	6	2	4	6
6	(United States) J Sadri	5	4	6	6	3

=== Section 2 ===
First round
(Australia) B Drewett	2	6	1	6	6
4	(United States) V Gerulaitis	6	4	6	4	4
(United States) S Mayer	6	3	7	4	6
(United States) F Buehning	1	6	5	6	3
(United States) S McCain	6	6	7
(Australia) J James	4	4	5
10	(United States) B Scanlon	6	3	6	6
(Australia) G Whitecross	3	6	3	3
14	(Australia) K Warwick	6	6	6
(Australia) R Case	4	4	1
(Australia) J Fitzgerald	6	6	2	6
(India) S Menon	2	4	6	2
(United States) F Taygan	7	7	6
(United States) G Hardie	6	6	1
7	(United States) V Amaya	3	6	7	6
(Australia) J Alexander	6	4	5	3

Second round
(Australia) B Drewett	3	6	6	7
(United States) S Mayer	6	3	3	6
(United States) S McCain	6	6	7	3	1
10	(United States) B Scanlon	3	7	6	6	6
14	(Australia) K Warwick	6	6	6	6	6
(Australia) J Fitzgerald	7	4	7	2	4
(United States) F Taygan	3	6	5
7	(United States) V Amaya	6	7	7

Third round
(Australia) B Drewett	2	6	4	4
10	(United States) B Scanlon	6	4	6	6
14	(Australia) K Warwick	6	6	6
7	(United States) V Amaya	3	3	3

Quarterfinals
10	(United States) B Scanlon	4	2	6	1
14	(Australia) K Warwick	6	6	4	6

=== Section 3 ===
First round
8	(United States) B Teacher	7	3	7	7
(United States) T Mayotte	6	6	5	6
(West Germany) U Marten	6	7	7
(South Africa) E Edwards	4	6	5
(Australia) C Dibley	3	6	7	6
(United States) H Pfister	6	3	6	4
(United States) J Austin	6	6	6
9	(France) Y Noah	3	2	1
12	(Australia) P McNamee	7	6	3	6
(New Zealand) C Lewis	6	3	6	2
Q	(Australia) C Johnstone	6	1	7	6
(United States) B Martin	4	6	5	2
(Australia) M Edmondson	7	7	6
(Rhodesia) A Pattison	6	6	3
3	(Argentina) JL Clerc	6	6	3	6
(United States) T Gullikson	3	1	6	4

Second round
8	(United States) B Teacher	6	7	7
(West Germany) U Marten	2	6	6
(Australia) C Dibley	2	6	6	4
(United States) J Austin	6	7	4	6
12	(Australia) P McNamee	6	7	6	6
Q	(Australia) C Johnstone	2	5	7	2
(Australia) M Edmondson	6	6	6
3	(Argentina) JL Clerc	2	3	4

Third round
8	(United States) B Teacher	6	6	7
(United States) J Austin	4	1	6
12	(Australia) P McNamee	6	6	6
(Australia) M Edmondson	4	3	3

Quarterfinals
8	(United States) B Teacher	6	4	6	7
12	(Australia) P McNamee	4	6	0	6

=== Section 4 ===
First round
5	(United States) B Gottfried	7	4	6	6
(United States) T Wilkison	5	6	0	2
(Australia) S Ball	6	3	2	6	7
(France) T Tulasne	0	6	6	0	5
Q	(United States) M Estep	7	6	7
(Australia) T Rocavert	6	4	5
15	(Australia) P McNamara	7	7	6
(Austria) P Feigl	5	6	0
(France) P Portes	3	6	6	7
13	(United States) P Fleming	6	3	3	6
(United States) P Rennert	1	6	7	6
(Australia) G Masters	6	4	6	4
(United States) P DuPré	6	3	7	4	6
Q	(Australia) J Trickey	2	6	6	6	4
2	(Czechoslovakia) I Lendl	6	6	6
(Australia) R Frawley	3	1	1

Second round
5	(United States) B Gottfried	6	6	6
(Australia) S Ball	1	4	4
Q	(United States) M Estep	6	6	1	1
15	(Australia) P McNamara	7	3	6	6
(France) P Portes	3	6	7	4	4
(United States) P Rennert	6	3	6	6	6
(United States) P DuPré	7	6	3	2	7
2	(Czechoslovakia) I Lendl	5	3	6	6	6

Third round
5	(United States) B Gottfried	5	2	4
15	(Australia) P McNamara	7	6	6
(United States) P Rennert	4	7	7	6
(United States) P DuPré	6	6	6	4

Quarterfinals
15	(Australia) P McNamara	7	5	6	6	6
(United States) P Rennert	6	7	2	7	3

Preceded by 1980 US Open	Grand Slam men's singles	Succeeded by 1981 French Open
