= Bill Cowan (tennis) =

Canadian tennis player

- Full name: William Cowan
- Country (sports): Canada
- Born: 28 April 1959 (age 66) Toronto, Ontario, Canada
- Plays: Right-handed, One-handed Backhand

Singles
- Career record: 1–8
- Highest ranking: No. 207 (8 December 1986)

Grand Slam singles results
- Australian Open: Q2 (1980)
- Wimbledon: Q1 (1986, 1987)
- US Open: 1R (1981)

Doubles
- Career record: 2–10
- Highest ranking: No. 225 (1 October 1984)

William Cowan (born 28 April 1959) is a Canadian former professional tennis player.

Cowan, a Toronto native, featured in the singles main draw at the 1981 US Open.

Between 1982 and 1984, Cowan competed in four Davis Cup ties for Canada. He won his only singles rubber, over Venezuela's Abraham Sojo, but was less successful in doubles, losing all four rubbers.

Bill Cowan is a certified Coach 4 and Club Pro 2. He has a history of working with players, going back to 1989 when he started working with Rene Simpson as she hit the Top 100 rankings. Cowan has assisted players like Peter Polansky, Daniel Nestor, Maureen Drake, Gloria Liang, Carol Zhao, and Brayden Schnur.

== See also ==
- List of Canada Davis Cup team representatives
