= 1980 Australian Open – Men's doubles =

Men's doubles
- 1980 Australian Open

Final
- Champion: (Australia) Mark Edmondson (Australia) Kim Warwick
- Runner-up: (Australia) Paul McNamee (Australia) Peter McNamara
- Score: 7–5, 6–4

Details
- Draw: 32
- Seeds: 8

Events
Singles	men	women		boys	girls
Doubles	men	women	mixed	boys	girls
WC Singles	men	women	quad
WC Doubles	men	women	quad
Legends	men	women	mixed
- Australian Open

Mark Edmondson and Kim Warwick defeated the defending champions Paul McNamee and Peter McNamara in the final, 7–5, 6–4 to win the men's doubles tennis title at the 1980 Australian Open.

== Seeds ==
1. (Australia) Paul McNamee / (Australia) Peter McNamara (final)
2. (United States) Brian Gottfried / (United States) Sandy Mayer (quarterfinals)
3. (United States) Victor Amaya / (United States) Hank Pfister (second round)
4. (South Africa) Kevin Curren / (United States) Steve Denton (first round)
5. (Czechoslovakia) Ivan Lendl / (United States) Bill Scanlon (first round)
6. (United States) Fritz Buehning / (United States) Ferdi Taygan (first round)
7. (Australia) Mark Edmondson / (Australia) Kim Warwick (champions)
8. (United States) Peter Fleming / (United States) Peter Rennert (first round)

== Draw ==
Key

- Q = Qualifier
- WC = Wild card
- LL = Lucky loser
- Alt = Alternate
- ITF = ITF entry
- PR = Protected ranking
- SR = Special ranking
- SE = Special exempt
- JE = Junior exempt
- JR = Junior Accelerator Programme entrant
- CO = College Accelerator Programme entrant
- NG = Next Gen Accelerator Program entrant
- w/o = Walkover
- r = Retired
- d = Defaulted

=== Finals ===
Semifinals
1	(Australia) Paul McNamee (Australia) Peter McNamara	6	6	7
(South Africa) Eddie Edwards (United States) Craig Edwards	7	2	6
7	(Australia) Mark Edmondson (Australia) Kim Warwick	6	7
(United States) Billy Martin (New Zealand) Russell Simpson	3	6

Final
1	(Australia) Paul McNamee (Australia) Peter McNamara	5	4
7	(Australia) Mark Edmondson (Australia) Kim Warwick	7	6

=== Top half ===
First round
1	(Australia) P McNamee (Australia) P McNamara	6	6
(United States) J DiLouie (Australia) W Hampson	2	1
(United States) C Mayotte (West Germany) U Marten	6	6
(United States) T Cain (United States) B Maze	2	3
(Australia) J Fitzgerald (Australia) W Pascoe	7	2	6
(Australia) R Case (Australia) G Masters	6	6	3
(United States) M Estep (Australia) P Kronk	6	6
5	(Czechoslovakia) I Lendl (United States) B Scanlon	3	0
3	(United States) V Amaya (United States) H Pfister	6	6
(Australia) D Carter (Australia) B Drewett	3	4
(South Africa) E Edwards (United States) C Edwards	3	6	6
(United States) J Sadri (United States) T Wilkison	6	4	3
(Australia) E Ewert (Australia) B Guan	6
(Australia) J Alexander (Australia) P Dent	3	^{r}
(Australia) C Kachel (India) S Menon	6	1	6
8	(United States) P Fleming (United States) P Rennert	3	6	3

Second round
1	(Australia) P McNamee (Australia) P McNamara	6	7
(United States) C Mayotte (West Germany) U Marten	2	6
(Australia) J Fitzgerald (Australia) W Pascoe	7	2	2
(United States) M Estep (Australia) P Kronk	6	6	6
3	(United States) V Amaya (United States) H Pfister	6	4
(South Africa) E Edwards (United States) C Edwards	7	6
(Australia) E Ewert (Australia) B Guan	3	4
(Australia) C Kachel (India) S Menon	6	6

Quarterfinals
1	(Australia) P McNamee (Australia) P McNamara	6	4	6
(United States) M Estep (Australia) P Kronk	3	6	3
(South Africa) E Edwards (United States) C Edwards	6	6
(Australia) E Ewert (Australia) B Guan	4	2

Semifinals
1	(Australia) P McNamee (Australia) P McNamara	6	6	7
(South Africa) E Edwards (United States) C Edwards	7	2	6

== Bottom half ==
First round
7	(Australia) M Edmondson (Australia) K Warwick	1	7	6
(Australia) P Doohan (Australia) C Miller	6	5	3
(Australia) T Rocavert (United Kingdom) J Smith	6	7
(Australia) S Docherty (United States) T Graham	4	5
(Australia) S Ball (Australia) C Letcher	6	6
(Australia) C Dibley (Australia) J James	4	4
(Australia) R Frawley (New Zealand) C Lewis	6	4	6
4	(United States) K Curren (United States) S Denton	4	6	4
6	(United States) F Buehning (United States) F Taygan	3	6	3
(United States) B Martin (New Zealand) R Simpson	6	3	6
(Australia) D Collings (Australia) D Crealy	3	7	6
(United States) G Holroyd (United States) C Wittus	6	5	3
(United States) D Siegler (Australia) G Whitecross	6	5	6
(United States) T Gullikson (United States) A Pattison	4	7	4
(Australia) C Fancutt (Australia) C Johnstone	5	3
3	(United States) B Gottfried (United States) S Mayer	7	6

Second round
7	(Australia) M Edmondson (Australia) K Warwick	6	6
(Australia) T Rocavert (United Kingdom) J Smith	4	4
(Australia) S Ball (Australia) C Letcher	6	4
(Australia) R Frawley (New Zealand) C Lewis	7	6
(United States) B Martin (New Zealand) R Simpson	6	7
(Australia) D Collings (Australia) D Crealy	2	6
(United States) D Siegler (Australia) G Whitecross	3	2
2	(United States) B Gottfried (United States) S Mayer	6	6

Quarterfinals
7	(Australia) M Edmondson (Australia) K Warwick	6	7
(Australia) R Frawley (New Zealand) C Lewis	4	6
(United States) B Martin (New Zealand) R Simpson	6	6	7
2	(United States) B Gottfried (United States) S Mayer	3	7	6

Semifinals
7	(Australia) M Edmondson (Australia) K Warwick	6	7
(United States) B Martin (New Zealand) R Simpson	3	6
