= Renee Blount =

American tennis player

- Country (sports): United States
- Born: May 12, 1957 (age 69) Washington, D.C.
- Height: 5 ft 4 in (1.63 m)
- Turned pro: 1978
- Plays: Right-handed
- Prize money: $123,169

Singles
- Career record: 23–33
- Career titles: 0
- Highest ranking: No. 63

Grand Slam singles results
- Australian Open: 2R (1978, 1980)
- French Open: 2R (1981)
- Wimbledon: 3R (1981)
- US Open: 2R (1980, 1981)

Doubles
- Career record: 9–19
- Career titles: 0
- Highest ranking: No. 8

Grand Slam doubles results
- Australian Open: QF (1976)
- French Open: 2R (1985)
- Wimbledon: QF (1984)
- US Open: 2R (1980, 1981, 1985)

Renee Blount (born May 12, 1957) is a retired American tennis player.

== Career ==
Blount was a No. 1 singles and doubles All-American player for UCLA. She joined the WTA Tour in 1978 and went on to reach a career-high ranking of 63 in singles and world No. 8 in doubles.

Blount was the fifth seed in the 1978 Australian Open and competed in the 1979 US Open and the 1980 US Open.

In 1979, she made history when she became the first African American woman to win a professional tennis tournament since Althea Gibson when she won the Futures of Columbus.

In 1984, Blount achieved her best Grand Slam women's doubles result, reaching the quarterfinals at Wimbledon partnering Janet Newberry, losing to Kathy Jordan and Anne Smith 0–6, 1–6.

Blount was also a mixed-doubles semifinalist at the French Open and extended Martina Navratilova to three sets at the 1980 Australian Open. She competed in Wimbledon five times, including a 1986 doubles quarterfinal appearance.

== Life after tennis ==
After retiring from professional tennis, she became an assistant coach at the University of Virginia and was inducted into the St. Louis Tennis Hall of Fame in 1997.

Blount founded the Keswick Tennis Foundation to help children with autism and disabilities develop skills through tennis. She currently coaches at the Keswick Tennis Foundation in Central Virginia.
