= Jane Preyer =

American tennis player

- Country (sports): United States
- Born: December 6, 1953 (age 72)

Grand Slam singles results
- Australian Open: 1R (1982)
- French Open: 1R (1983)
- Wimbledon: 3R (1982)
- US Open: 1R (1981, 1982)

Grand Slam doubles results
- Australian Open: 2R (1981)
- French Open: 1R (1983)
- Wimbledon: 2R (1979)
- US Open: 2R (1980)

Jane Preyer (born December 6, 1953) is an American former professional tennis player.

A native of North Carolina, Preyer competed on the professional tour in the 1970s and 1980s. Her best performances included a win over Evonne Goolagong at the 1981 National Panasonic Classic in Perth and a third round appearance at the 1982 Wimbledon Championships.

Preyer was women's head coach of Duke University for six seasons beginning in 1985 and guided the team to four Atlantic Coast Conference championships.

== WTA Tour finals ==
=== Doubles (0-1) ===
Result	Date	Tournament	Surface	Partner	Opponents	Score
Loss	Feb 1982	Nashville, Tennessee, U.S.	Carpet	(United States) Alycia Moulton	(Australia) Chris O'Neil (Sweden) Mimmi Wikstedt	2–6, 6–7
