= Kerryn Pratt =

Australian sports broadcaster and tennis player

- Country (sports): Australia
- Born: 20 June 1959 (age 65)

Singles

Grand Slam singles results
- Australian Open: 2R (1979, 1980)
- Wimbledon: Q2 (1979, 1981)
- US Open: Q1 (1980)

Doubles

Grand Slam doubles results
- Australian Open: SF (1979)
- Wimbledon: 1R (1981)
- US Open: 1R (1980)

Kerryn Pratt (born 20 June 1959) is an Australian sports broadcaster and former professional tennis player.

Trained at the AIS, Pratt is the daughter of tennis player Maureen McCalman and was a two-time Australian Open girls' doubles champion. She twice reached the women's singles second round at the Australian Open and was a women's doubles semi-finalist with Elizabeth Little in 1979.

Pratt began her media career as a sports reporter for the Seven Network in the mid 1980s before joining Nine, where she reported on the Wide World of Sports and was a producer on 60 Minutes in the 1990s. She has commentated on every Summer Olympics from Sydney to Rio de Janeiro, covering tennis, table tennis, badminton and softball.
