= Sophie Amiach =

French tennis player (born 1963)

- Country (sports): France
- Born: 10 November 1963 (age 61); Paris, France
- Turned pro: 1980
- Retired: 1995
- Prize money: $309,669

Singles
- Career record: 190–203 (48.3%)
- Highest ranking: No. 57 (2 April 1984)

Grand Slam singles results
- Australian Open: QF (1984)
- French Open: 3R (1989)
- Wimbledon: 2R (1984)
- US Open: 2R (1989)

Doubles
- Career record: 114–159 (41.8%)
- Career titles: 5 ITF
- Highest ranking: No. 62 (14 August 1989)

Grand Slam doubles results
- Australian Open: QF (1980)
- French Open: 3R (1987)
- Wimbledon: 2R (1985)
- US Open: 2R (1982)

Sophie Amiach (born 10 November 1963 in Paris) is a former professional tennis player from France who played on the WTA Tour from 1980 to 1995.

Currently, she provides commentary on professional tennis in both English and French for different networks throughout the world. Sophie also covered the 2016 Wimbledon final between Serena Williams and Angelique Kerber for BBC Radio.

== Career ==
Born in Paris, Sophie Amiach grew up in the south of France. Having started playing tennis at 4 years old, she became one of the best French juniors. She won the first junior girls doubles at French Open in 1981. Amiach was selected in the 1981 French team of the then-Federation Cup. She reached the quarterfinals of the Australian Open in 1984 and played in ten French Opens. In 1987, Amiach was coached by Billie Jean King.

== WTA Tour finals ==
=== Doubles: 1 (runner-up) ===
Outcome	Year	Championship	Surface	Partner	Opponents	Score
Runner-Up	1989	Taranto, Italy	Clay	(France) Emmanuelle Derly	(Socialist Federal Republic of Yugoslavia) Sabrina Goleš (Argentina) Mercedes Paz	2–6, 2–6

== ITF finals ==
=== Singles (0–4) ===
$25,000 tournaments
$10,000 tournaments

Outcome	No.	Date	Tournament	Surface	Opponent	Score
Runner-up	1.	April 26, 1981	Bournemouth, United Kingdom	Clay	(United Kingdom) Jo Durie	5–7, 6–1, 3–6
Runner-up	2.	July 13, 1981	Pesaro, Italy	Clay	(Peru) Pilar Vásquez	2–6, 0–6
Runner-up	3.	November 9, 1981	South Yarra, Australia	Hard	(France) Catherine Tanvier	3–6, 1–6
Runner-up	4.	September 19, 1988	Chicago, United States	Hard	(West Germany) Martina Pawlik	1–6, 5–7

=== Doubles (6–5) ===
Outcome	No.	Date	Tournament	Surface	Partner	Opponents	Score
Runner-up	1.	April 26, 1981	Bournemouth, United Kingdom	Clay	(France) Catherine Tanvier	(United Kingdom) Jo Durie (United Kingdom) Debbie Jevans	0–6, 1–6
Winner	2.	November 2, 1981	Frankston, Australia	Hard	(France) Catherine Tanvier	(Australia) Kym Ruddell (Australia) Gwen Warnock	6–4, 6–2
Winner	3.	April 11, 1982	Curitiba, Brazil	Clay	(New Zealand) Linda Stewart	(Brazil) Andrea Meister (Brazil) Marillia Matte	6–2, 6–2
Runner-up	4.	February 8, 1988	Stavanger, Norway	Carpet	(United States) Lisa Bobby	(Sweden) Jonna Jonerup (Sweden) Maria Strandlund	2–6, 6–7
Runner-up	5.	June 6, 1988	Key Biscayne, United States	Hard	(United States) Jennifer Santrock	(Mexico) Lucila Becerra (Mexico) Xóchitl Escobedo	4–6, 6–2, 5–7
Runner-up	6.	June 27, 1988	Augusta, United States	Hard	(United States) Lisa Bobby	(South Korea) Kim Il-soon (South Korea) Lee Jeong-myung	1–6, 2–6
Runner-up	7.	September 25, 1989	Chicago, United States	Hard	(Australia) Kristine Kunce	(United States) Mary-Lou Daniels (United States) Candy Reynolds	3–6, 3–6
Winner	8.	October 1, 1990	York, United States	Hard	(United States) Louise Allen	(Netherlands) Simone Schilder (Netherlands) Caroline Vis	7–6^{(4)}, 6–4
Winner	9.	June 17, 1991	St. Simons, United States	Clay	(United States) Louise Allen	(United States) Patti O'Reilly (United States) Christine O'Reilly	6–3, 6–7^{(5)}, 6–3
Winner	10.	January 18, 1993	Mcallen, United States	Hard	(United States) Louise Allen	(United States) Alysia May (United States) Stephanie Reece	6–3, 7–6^{(2)}
Winner	11.	January 24, 1994	Austin, United States	Hard	(Australia) Tracey Morton-Rodgers	(United States) Jean Ceniza (South Africa) Mareze Joubert	7–6^{(8)}, 7–6^{(5)}

== Grand Slam singles performance timeline ==
Key
W	F	SF	QF	#R	RR	Q#	DNQ	A	NH

(W) winner; (F) finalist; (SF) semifinalist; (QF) quarterfinalist; (#R) rounds 4, 3, 2, 1; (RR) round-robin stage; (Q#) qualification round; (DNQ) did not qualify; (A) absent; (NH) not held; (SR) strike rate (events won / competed); (W–L) win–loss record.

Tournament	1981	1982	1983	1984	1985	1986	1987	1988	1989	1990	1991	1992	1993
Australian Open	A	A	1R	QF	1R	A	A	A	A	A	A	A	A
French Open	1R	1R	1R	2R	1R	1R	A	A	3R	2R	A	1R	1R
Wimbledon	A	A	A	2R	1R	A	A	A	2R	1R	A	A	A
US Open	A	1R	A	1R	1R	A	A	A	2R	A	A	A	A
