= 1980 Australian Open =

Tennis tournament

- Date: 24–30 November 1980 (women); 26 December 1980 – 4 January 1981 (men)
- Edition: 69th
- Category: Grand Slam (ITF)
- Surface: Grass
- Location: Melbourne, Australia
- Venue: Kooyong Lawn Tennis Club

Champions

Men's singles
- (United States) Brian Teacher

Women's singles
- (Czechoslovakia) Hana Mandlíková

Men's doubles
- (Australia) Mark Edmondson / (Australia) Kim Warwick

Women's doubles
- (United States) Betsy Nagelsen / (United States) Martina Navratilova

Boys' singles
- (Australia) Craig Miller

Girls' singles
- (Australia) Anne Minter
- Australian Open

The 1980 Australian Open was a tennis tournament played on outdoor grass courts at the Kooyong Lawn Tennis Club in Melbourne, Australia. It was the 69th edition of the Australian Open. The women's tournament was held 24–30 November 1980 and the men's was held from 26 December 1980 through 4 January 1981. The singles titles were won by American Brian Teacher and Czechoslovak Hana Mandlíková.

== Seniors ==
=== Men's singles ===
(United States) Brian Teacher defeated (Australia) Kim Warwick 7–5, 7–6^{(7–4)}, 6–3

• It was Teacher's 1st and only career Grand Slam singles title.

=== Women's singles ===
(Czechoslovakia) Hana Mandlíková defeated (Australia) Wendy Turnbull 6–0, 7–5

• It was Mandlíková's 1st career Grand Slam singles title.

=== Men's doubles ===
(Australia) Mark Edmondson / (Australia) Kim Warwick defeated (Australia) Peter McNamara / (Australia) Paul McNamee 7–5, 6–4

- It was Edmondson's 2nd career Grand Slam title and his 2nd Australian Open title. It was Warwick's 2nd career Grand Slam title and his 2nd Australian Open title.

=== Women's doubles ===
(United States) Betsy Nagelsen / (United States) Martina Navratilova defeated (United States) Ann Kiyomura / (United States) Candy Reynolds 6–4, 6–4

• It was Nagelsen's 2nd and last career Grand Slam doubles title.
• It was Navratilova's 7th career Grand Slam doubles title and her 1st title at the Australian Open.

=== Mixed doubles ===
The competition was not held between 1970 and 1986.

== Juniors ==
=== Boys' singles ===
(Australia) Craig Miller defeated (Australia) Wally Masur 7–6, 6–2

=== Girls' singles ===
(Australia) Anne Minter defeated (Australia) Elizabeth Sayers 6–4, 6–2

Preceded by 1980 US Open	Grand Slams	Succeeded by 1981 French Open
