= Susan Leo =

Australian tennis player

- Country (sports): Australia
- Born: 10 August 1962 (age 63) Brisbane, Australia
- Height: 5 ft 4 1/2 in (1.64 m)
- Plays: Right-handed
- Prize money: US$ 201,037

Singles
- Career record: 52–89

Grand Slam singles results
- Australian Open: 2R (1980, 1981)
- French Open: 2R (1982)
- Wimbledon: 3R (1981, 1983, 1984)
- US Open: 3R (1980)

Doubles
- Career record: 101–124

Grand Slam doubles results
- Australian Open: 2R (1980, 1982)
- Wimbledon: QF (1981, 1982)

Grand Slam mixed doubles results
- Wimbledon: 2R (1980)
- US Open: 2R (1978)

Susan Leo (born 10 August 1962) is a retired professional tennis player from Australia. She competed in the Fed Cup from 1980 to 1983.

Leo won the singles title at the Queensland Open in 1976 and at the Western Australian Open in 1980. She reached the quarterfinals in doubles at Wimbledon in 1981 and 1982.
