= 1980 US Open – Women's singles qualifying =

Women's singles qualifying
- 1980 US Open

Events
Singles	men	women		boys	girls
Doubles	men	women	mixed	boys	girls
WC Singles	men	women	quad
WC Doubles	men	women	quad
Legends	men	women	mixed
← 1979 ·	US Open	· 1981 →

Players who neither had high enough rankings nor received wild cards to enter the main draw of the annual US Open Tennis Championships participated in a qualifying tournament held over several days before the event.

== Qualifiers ==
1. (United States) Elise Burgin
2. (United States) Zina Garrison
3. (Argentina) Liliana Giussani
4. (United States) Lea Antonoplis
5. (Netherlands) Nanette Schutte
6. (United States) Lisa Doherty
7. (United Kingdom) Anthea Stewart
8. (United States) Joyce Portman

== Lucky losers ==
1. (United States) Kimberly Jones
2. (United States) Susie Jaeger
3. (France) Frédérique Thibault

== Qualifying draw ==
=== Key ===
- Q = Qualifier
- WC = Wild card
- LL = Lucky loser
- Alt = Alternate
- ITF = ITF entry
- PR = Protected ranking
- SR = Special ranking
- SE = Special exempt
- JE = Junior exempt
- JR = Junior Accelerator Programme entrant
- CO = College Accelerator Programme entrant
- NG = Next Gen Accelerator Program entrant
- w/o = Walkover
- r = Retired
- d = Defaulted

=== First qualifier ===
First round
1	(United States) June Ferestien	6	6
8	(Romania) Maria Romanov	2	2
4	(United States) Kathrin Keil	7	3	6
5	(Canada) Angela Walker	6	6	3
2	(United States) Elise Burgin	6	3	6
7	(Australia) Cathy Griffiths	0	6	2
3	(United States) Andrea Buchanan	6	6
6	(United States) Michelle Weiss	1	2

Second round
(United States) June Ferestien	3	7	6
(United States) Kathrin Keil	6	6	3
(United States) Elise Burgin	6	6
(United States) Andrea Buchanan	4	4

Qualifying competition
(United States) June Ferestien	4	2
(United States) Elise Burgin	6	6

=== Second qualifier ===
First round
1	(United States) Zina Garrison	6	6
8	(United States) Ann Henricksson	4	1
4	(United States) Betsy Blaney	6	6
5	(United States) Genevieve Greiwe	3	2
2	(United States) Bonnie Gadusek	6	6
7	(Brazil) Gláucia Langela	0	4
3	(United States) Kimberly Jones	6	6
6	(Japan) Sonoe Yonezawa	4	0

Second round
(United States) Zina Garrison	6	6
(United States) Betsy Blaney	4	2
(United States) Bonnie Gadusek	4	0
(United States) Kimberly Jones	6	6

Qualifying competition
(United States) Zina Garrison	6	6
(United States) Kimberly Jones	1	3

=== Third qualifier ===
First round
1	(United States) Susie Jaeger	6	7
8	(United States) Judith Principe	4	5
4	(Brazil) Cláudia Monteiro	6	6
5	(Australia) Nancy Harris	3	2
2	(Argentina) Liliana Giussani	6	6
7	(United States) Phyllis Blackwell	2	3
3	(France) Caroline Franch	6	6
6	(New Zealand) Chris Newton	4	3

Second round
(United States) Susie Jaeger	6	4	6
(Brazil) Cláudia Monteiro	0	6	4
(Argentina) Liliana Giussani	6	6
(France) Caroline Franch	2	2

Qualifying competition
(United States) Susie Jaeger	1	6
(Argentina) Liliana Giussani	6	7

=== Fourth qualifier ===
First round
1	(Australia) Pam Whytcross	1	6	6
8	(Hungary) Beatrix Klein	6	1	2
4	(United States) Nancy Ornstein	7	6
5	(United States) Shannon Gordon	5	4
2	(Italy) Barbara Rossi	6	6
7	(United States) Becky Bell	2	4
3	(United States) Lea Antonoplis	7	6
6	(Italy) Daniela Porzio	6	4

Second round
(Australia) Pam Whytcross	2	6	6
(United States) Nancy Ornstein	6	4	1
(Italy) Barbara Rossi	6	6	6
(United States) Lea Antonoplis	7	4	7

Qualifying competition
(Australia) Pam Whytcross	4	2
(United States) Lea Antonoplis	6	6

=== Fifth qualifier ===
First round
1	(United States) Donna Rubin	7	6
8	(Japan) Naoko Sato	6	4
4	(United States) Jane Preyer	6	6
5	(Canada) Karen Dewis	3	3
2	(United States) Caryn Copeland	6	6
7	(Sweden) Mimmi Wikstedt	2	4
3	(Netherlands) Nanette Schutte	6	6
6	(France) Sylvie Provoust	3	4

Second round
(United States) Donna Rubin	2	5
(United States) Jane Preyer	6	7
(United States) Caryn Copeland	7	5	3
(Netherlands) Nanette Schutte	5	7	6

Qualifying competition
(United States) Jane Preyer	3	3
(Netherlands) Nanette Schutte	6	6

=== Sixth qualifier ===
First round
1	(United States) Lisa Doherty	6	6
8	(United States) Jean Hepner	0	4
4	(Italy) Patrizia Murgo	6	6
5	(United States) Heather Ludloff	3	3
2	(Chile) Silvana Urroz	6	6
7	(Australia) Jenny Walker	2	3
3	(Australia) Elizabeth Little	6	7
6	(South Africa) Ilana Kloss	2	6

Second round
(United States) Lisa Doherty	6	6
(Italy) Patrizia Murgo	4	4
(Chile) Silvana Urroz	2	4
(Australia) Elizabeth Little	6	6

Qualifying competition
(United States) Lisa Doherty	3	7	6
(Australia) Elizabeth Little	6	6	3

=== Seventh qualifier ===
First round
1	(Australia) Chris O'Neil	6	1	6
8	(United States) Shelley Solomon	3	6	4
4	(United States) Jodi Appelbaum-Steinbauer	6	3	6
5	(United States) Jill Davis	2	6	1
2	(United Kingdom) Anthea Stewart	6	6
7	(United States) Kathy Mueller	3	2
3	(United States) Vicki Beggs	6	1	6
6	(United States) Sheila McInerney	4	6	1

Second round
(Australia) Chris O'Neil	7	2	6
(United States) Jodi Appelbaum-Steinbauer	5	6	1
(United Kingdom) Anthea Stewart	6	6
(United States) Vicki Beggs	4	1

Qualifying competition
(Australia) Chris O'Neil	4	2
(United Kingdom) Anthea Stewart	6	6

=== Eighth qualifier ===
First round
1	(United States) Joyce Portman	6	6
8	(United States) Nina Voydat	2	3
4	(United States) Kathleen Cummings	6	7
5	(United States) Cathy Farrell	3	5
2	(United States) Felicia Raschiatore	6	6
7	(United States) Penny Johnson	4	2
3	(France) Frédérique Thibault	6	6
6	(Australia) Kerryn Pratt	1	2

Second round
(United States) Joyce Portman	7	6
(United States) Kathleen Cummings	5	1
(United States) Felicia Raschiatore	5	3
(France) Frédérique Thibault	7	6

Qualifying competition
(United States) Joyce Portman	6	7
(France) Frédérique Thibault	3	5
