= 1979 US Open – Women's singles qualifying =

Women's singles qualifying
- 1979 US Open

Events
Singles	men	women		boys	girls
Doubles	men	women	mixed	boys	girls
WC Singles	men	women	quad
WC Doubles	men	women	quad
Legends	men	women	mixed
← 1978 ·	US Open	· 1980 →

Players who neither had high enough rankings nor received wild cards to enter the main draw of the annual US Open Tennis Championships participated in a qualifying tournament held over several days before the event.

== Qualifiers ==
1. (United States) Julie Harrington
2. (United States) Heather Ludloff
3. (United States) Kelly Henry
4. (Australia) Amanda Tobin
5. (South Africa) Rosalyn Fairbank
6. (United States) Trey Lewis
7. (United States) Susan Mascarin
8. (United States) Kathleen Horvath

== Qualifying draw ==
=== Key ===
- Q = Qualifier
- WC = Wild card
- LL = Lucky loser
- Alt = Alternate
- ITF = ITF entry
- PR = Protected ranking
- SR = Special ranking
- SE = Special exempt
- JE = Junior exempt
- JR = Junior Accelerator Programme entrant
- CO = College Accelerator Programme entrant
- NG = Next Gen Accelerator Program entrant
- w/o = Walkover
- r = Retired
- d = Defaulted

=== First qualifier ===
First round
1	(Sweden) Helena Anliot	6	7^{7}
8	(Australia) Kym Ruddell	1	6^{3}
4	(United States) Lisa Doherty	6	7
5	(United States) Sue Stap	4	5
2	(United States) Kathy Mueller	6	6
7	(France) Pascale Bernateau	1	3
3	(United States) Julie Harrington	6	6
6	(Australia) Mary Sawyer	4	2

Second round
(Sweden) Helena Anliot	1	5
(United States) Lisa Doherty	6	7
(United States) Kathy Mueller	4	4
(United States) Julie Harrington	6	6

Qualifying competition
(United States) Lisa Doherty	7	4	1
(United States) Julie Harrington	5	6	6

=== Second qualifier ===
First round
1	(United States) Sandy Stap	6	6
8	(Chile) Silvana Urroz	4	1
4	(United States) Heather Ludloff	4	6	6
5	(New Zealand) Brenda Perry	6	2	4
2	(United States) Felicia Hutnick	7	6
7	(South Africa) Karin Boshoff	5	0
3	(Romania) Mariana Simionescu	6	6
6	(United States) Jean Nachand	2	1

Second round
(United States) Sandy Stap	6	2	6^{4}
(United States) Heather Ludloff	2	6	7^{7}
(United States) Felicia Hutnick	1	3
(Romania) Mariana Simionescu	6	6

Qualifying competition
(United States) Heather Ludloff
(Romania) Mariana Simionescu	w/o

=== Third qualifier ===
First round
1	(United States) Kelly Henry	6	6
8	(United States) Kim Sands	2	0
4	(United States) Marlie Buehler	6	6
5	(United States) Jane Preyer	1	4
2	(United States) Maria Rothschild	7	6
7	(Netherlands) Jeske Van Erven	5	0
3	(United States) Jane Stratton	6	6
6	(United States) Valerie Ziegenfuss	4	0

Second round
(United States) Kelly Henry	6	6
(United States) Marlie Buehler	1	1
(United States) Maria Rothschild	6^{5}	4
(United States) Jane Stratton	7^{7}	6

Qualifying competition
(United States) Kelly Henry	6	6
(United States) Jane Stratton	4	1

=== Fourth qualifier ===
First round
1	(Australia) Amanda Tobin	7^{7}	6
8	(United States) Cynthia Ashling	6^{2}	2
4	(United States) Joyce Portman	2	6	6
5	(United States) Nancy Ornstein	6	2	3
2	(United Kingdom) Glynis Coles	6	6
7	(Brazil) Cláudia Monteiro	0	2
3	(France) Frédérique Thibault	6^{5}	6	6
6	(United States) Anne White	7^{7}	3	3

Second round
(Australia) Amanda Tobin	6	3	6
(United States) Joyce Portman	4	6	4
(United Kingdom) Glynis Coles	4	4
(France) Frédérique Thibault	6	6

Qualifying competition
(Australia) Amanda Tobin	6	7
(France) Frédérique Thibault	3	5

=== Fifth qualifier ===
First round
1	(United States) Penny Johnson	6	6
8	(United Kingdom) Jo Durie	2	4
4	(South Africa) Rosalyn Fairbank	6	6
5	(Argentina) Adriana Villagrán	3	3
2	(United States) Sheila McInerney	7	6
7	(Australia) Wendy Gilchrist	5	0
3	(Netherlands) Marcella Mesker	6	6
6	(Australia) Pam Whytcross	4	0

Second round
(United States) Penny Johnson	4	3
(South Africa) Rosalyn Fairbank	6	6
(United States) Sheila McInerney	3	6	6
(Netherlands) Marcella Mesker	6	3	0

Qualifying competition
(South Africa) Rosalyn Fairbank	6	6
(United States) Sheila McInerney	4	2

=== Sixth qualifier ===
First round
1	(Japan) Naoko Sato
8	(Australia) Cathy Griffiths	w/o
4	(United States) Trey Lewis	6	6
5	(United States) Candy Reynolds	3	2
2	(United States) Kimberly Jones	7	6
7	(New Zealand) Judy Connor	5	3
3	(United States) Caryn Copeland	6	6
6	(France) Nathalie Fuchs	1	1

Second round
(Japan) Naoko Sato	6	2	3
(United States) Trey Lewis	3	6	6
(United States) Kimberly Jones	1	1
(United States) Caryn Copeland	6	6

Qualifying competition
(United States) Trey Lewis	6	6
(United States) Caryn Copeland	3	1

=== Seventh qualifier ===
First round
1	(United States) Susan Mascarin	6	6
8	(United Kingdom) Debbie Jevans	1	2
4	(Australia) Sue Saliba	2	6	6
5	(United States) Bunny Bruning	6	1	1
2	(United States) Rita Agassi	6	6
7	(Belgium) Michèle Gurdal	3	3
3	(United States) Laurie Rowley	6	6
6	(France) Dominique Beillan	0	1

Second round
(United States) Susan Mascarin	6	6
(Australia) Sue Saliba	1	3
(United States) Rita Agassi	4	1
(United States) Laurie Rowley	6	6

Qualifying competition
(United States) Susan Mascarin	6	6
(United States) Laurie Rowley	4	4

=== Eighth qualifier ===
First round
1	(Czechoslovakia) Yvona Brzáková	6	6
8	(Canada) Wendy Barlow	4	4
4	(Australia) Nerida Gregory	6	6
5	(United Kingdom) Clare Harrison	2	1
2	(France) Anne Chevalier	6	6
7	(Australia) Elizabeth Little	3	1
3	(United States) Kathleen Horvath	6	6
6	(France) Brigitte Simon	4	4

Second round
(Czechoslovakia) Yvona Brzáková	6	6
(Australia) Nerida Gregory	4	4
(France) Anne Chevalier	3	0
(United States) Kathleen Horvath	6	6

Qualifying competition
(Czechoslovakia) Yvona Brzáková	3	2
(United States) Kathleen Horvath	6	6
