= 1978 US Open – Women's singles qualifying =

Women's singles qualifying
- 1978 US Open

Events
Singles	men	women		boys	girls
Doubles	men	women	mixed	boys	girls
WC Singles	men	women	quad
WC Doubles	men	women	quad
Legends	men	women	mixed
← 1977 ·	US Open	· 1979 →

Players who neither had high enough rankings nor received wild cards to enter the main draw of the annual US Open Tennis Championships participated in a qualifying tournament held over several days before the event.

== Qualifiers ==
1. (United States) Felicia Hutnick
2. (West Germany) Bettina Bunge
3. (United States) Wendy White
4. (Argentina) Ivanna Madruga
5. (Japan) Sonoe Yonezawa
6. (United States) Anna-Maria Fernandez
7. (Netherlands) Elly Appel-Vessies
8. (United States) Kathy Jordan

== Qualifying draw ==
=== Key ===
- Q = Qualifier
- WC = Wild card
- LL = Lucky loser
- Alt = Alternate
- ITF = ITF entry
- PR = Protected ranking
- SR = Special ranking
- SE = Special exempt
- JE = Junior exempt
- JR = Junior Accelerator Programme entrant
- CO = College Accelerator Programme entrant
- NG = Next Gen Accelerator Program entrant
- w/o = Walkover
- r = Retired
- d = Defaulted

=== First qualifier ===
First round
1	(United States) Joyce Portman	6	6
8	(United States) Leslie Allen	3	1
4	(United States) Felicia Hutnick	6	6
5	(Israel) Paulina Peled	2	1
2	(United States) Karen Dawson	3	6	6
7	(Australia) Nerida Gregory	6	2	3
3	(Japan) Naoko Sato	6	3	6
6	(United States) Cynthia Ashling	3	6	4

Second round
(United States) Joyce Portman	2	3
(United States) Felicia Hutnick	6	6
(United States) Karen Dawson	4	1
(Japan) Naoko Sato	6	6

Qualifying competition
(United States) Felicia Hutnick	6	6
(Japan) Naoko Sato	1	0

=== Second qualifier ===
First round
1	(West Germany) Bettina Bunge	6	6
8	(United States) Marlie Buehler	2	0
4	(United States) Trey Lewis	6	6
5	(United Kingdom) Lindsey Beaven	0	1
2	(United States) Rita Agassi	6	3	6
7	(United States) Lisa Doherty	1	6	0
3	(United States) Robin Harris	6	6
6	(New Zealand) Chris Newton	2	4

Second round
(West Germany) Bettina Bunge	6	6
(United States) Trey Lewis	4	2
(United States) Rita Agassi	3	6	6^{5}
(United States) Robin Harris	6	1	7^{7}

Qualifying competition
(West Germany) Bettina Bunge	6	6
(United States) Robin Harris	2	0

=== Third qualifier ===
First round
1	(United States) Kim Sands	6	6
8	(Australia) Lili Bell	1	0
4	(United States) Wendy White	6	6
5	(Australia) Leanne Harrison	4	2
2	(United States) Susan Hagey	3	6	6
7	(Australia) Kaye Hallam	6	2	3
3	(United States) Sally Greer	6	6
6	(Hungary) Beatrix Klein	3	0

Second round
(United States) Kim Sands	6	3	1
(United States) Wendy White	4	6	6
(United States) Susan Hagey	1	3
(United States) Sally Greer	6	6

Qualifying competition
(United States) Wendy White	6	7
(United States) Sally Greer	3	5

=== Fourth qualifier ===
First round
1	(Argentina) Ivanna Madruga	6	6
8	(United States) Anne Fritz	1	0
4	(United States) Jean Nachand	7	6
5	(United States) Jane Preyer	5	2
2	(United Kingdom) Kate Glancy	6	6
7	(United States) Jenny Gardiner	3	3
3	(United Kingdom) Sue Mappin	6	6
6	(United States) Nancy Weigel	2	0

Second round
(Argentina) Ivanna Madruga	7^{7}	6
(United States) Jean Nachand	6^{5}	2
(United Kingdom) Kate Glancy	4	1
(United Kingdom) Sue Mappin	6	6

Qualifying competition
(Argentina) Ivanna Madruga	6	6
(United Kingdom) Sue Mappin	4	2

=== Fifth qualifier ===
First round
1	(Japan) Sonoe Yonezawa	3	6	6
8	(United States) Margaret Riley	6	2	4
4	(France) Anne Chevalier	1	6	6
5	(United States) Nancy Ornstein	6	4	3
2	(Chile) Silvana Urroz	6	6
7	(New Zealand) Brenda Perry	3	1
3	(United States) Sherry Acker	6	6
6	(Sweden) Ingrid Löfdahl Bentzer	2	1

Second round
(Japan) Sonoe Yonezawa	6	6
(France) Anne Chevalier	2	1
(Chile) Silvana Urroz	6	7
(United States) Sherry Acker	1	5

Qualifying competition
(Japan) Sonoe Yonezawa	6	0	6
(Chile) Silvana Urroz	4	6	2

=== Sixth qualifier ===
First round
1	(United States) Rayni Fox	6	6
8	(United States) Gretchen Galt	3	3
4	(United States) Anna-Maria Fernandez	6	6
5	(United States) Andrea Whitmore	4	3
2	(United States) Nancy Yeargin	6	6
7	(United States) Marcie Louie	1	4
3	(United States) Kay McDaniel	6^{4}	6	6
6	(United States) Linda Siegel	7^{7}	3	2

Second round
(United States) Rayni Fox	1	1
(United States) Anna-Maria Fernandez	6	6
(United States) Nancy Yeargin	4	3
(United States) Kay McDaniel	6	6

Qualifying competition
(United States) Anna-Maria Fernandez	6	6
(United States) Kay McDaniel	3	1

=== Seventh qualifier ===
First round
1	(Netherlands) Elly Appel-Vessies	6	6
8	(United States) Sue Stap	0	1
4	(Australia) Kym Ruddell	3	6	6
5	(United States) Lisa Kearney	6	3	4
2	(United States) Kathy O'Brien	6	6
7	(South Africa) Lynn Jacobs	2	2
3	(United States) Karen Hantze Susman	6	6
6	(France) Dominique Beillan	3	2

Second round
(Netherlands) Elly Appel-Vessies	6	6
(Australia) Kym Ruddell	1	0
(United States) Kathy O'Brien	6^{5}	1
(United States) Karen Hantze Susman	7^{7}	6

Qualifying competition
(Netherlands) Elly Appel-Vessies	6	7
(United States) Karen Hantze Susman	4	5

=== Eighth qualifier ===
First round
1	(United States) Renee Blount	6	6
8	(United States) Heather Ludloff	3	1
4	(United States) Diane Morrison	7	6
5	(United States) Jane Stratton	5	3
2	(Italy) Sabina Simmonds	6	6
7	(United States) Sandy Stap	4	4
3	(United States) Kathy Jordan	6	6
6	(France) Sylvie Rual	0	4

Second round
(United States) Renee Blount	4	2
(United States) Diane Morrison	6	6
(Italy) Sabina Simmonds	1	1
(United States) Kathy Jordan	6	6

Qualifying competition
(United States) Diane Morrison	1	0
(United States) Kathy Jordan	6	6
