= 1977 US Open – Women's singles qualifying =

Women's singles qualifying
- 1977 US Open

Events
Singles	men	women		boys	girls
Doubles	men	women	mixed	boys	girls
WC Singles	men	women	quad
WC Doubles	men	women	quad
Legends	men	women	mixed
US Open	· 1978 →

Players who neither had high enough rankings nor received wild cards to enter the main draw of the annual US Open Tennis Championships participated in a qualifying tournament held over several days before the event.

== Qualifiers ==
1. (United States) Peggy Michel
2. (United States) Margaret Riley
3. (United States) Robin Harris
4. (United States) Barbara Jordan
5. (United States) Peanut Louie Harper
6. (New Zealand) Pauline Elliott
7. (United States) Caroline Stoll
8. (United States) Sheila McInerney

== Lucky losers ==
1. (Australia) Sue Saliba

== Qualifying draw ==
=== Key ===
- Q = Qualifier
- WC = Wild card
- LL = Lucky loser
- Alt = Alternate
- ITF = ITF entry
- PR = Protected ranking
- SR = Special ranking
- SE = Special exempt
- JE = Junior exempt
- JR = Junior Accelerator Programme entrant
- CO = College Accelerator Programme entrant
- NG = Next Gen Accelerator Program entrant
- w/o = Walkover
- r = Retired
- d = Defaulted

=== First qualifier ===
First round
1	(United States) Peggy Michel	7
8	(Argentina) Raquel Giscafré	6^{r}
4	(United States) Nancy Yeargin	6	6
5	(United States) Marita Redondo	3	2
2	(France) Florence Guédy	5	6	6
7	(United States) Leslie Allen	7	2	1
3	(United States) Paula Smith	6	3	6
6	(New Zealand) Judy Connor	3	6	2

Second round
(United States) Peggy Michel	6	4	6
(United States) Nancy Yeargin	2	6	4
(France) Florence Guédy	6	2	6
(United States) Paula Smith	2	6	3

Qualifying competition
(United States) Peggy Michel	6	6
(France) Florence Guédy	1	2

=== Second qualifier ===
First round
1	(Australia) Christine Matison	5
8	(United States) Linda Siegleman	0^{r}
4	(Hungary) Beatrix Klein	7	6
5	(United States) Laurie Tenney	5	4
2	(United States) Aleida Spex	4	6	6
7	(Japan) Naoko Sato	6	3	4
3	(United States) Margaret Riley	6	6
6	(Australia) Wendy Gilchrist	1	3

Second round
(Australia) Christine Matison	3	4
(Hungary) Beatrix Klein	6	6
(United States) Aleida Spex	4	6	2
(United States) Margaret Riley	6	4	6

Qualifying competition
(Hungary) Beatrix Klein	3	6	1
(United States) Margaret Riley	6	4	6

=== Third qualifier ===
First round
1	(United States) Robin Harris	6	6
8	(France) Dominique Beillan	2	1
4	(Argentina) Viviana González	6	6
5	(United Kingdom) Penny Moor	4	1
2	(United States) Robin Tenney	6	7
7	(Canada) Marjorie Blackwood	4	6
3	(United States) Diane Morrison	6	6
6	(United States) Beverly Buckley	4	4

Second round
(United States) Robin Harris	1	6	6
(Argentina) Viviana González	6	3	1
(United States) Robin Tenney	6	7
(United States) Diane Morrison	3	5

Qualifying competition
(United States) Robin Harris	6	6
(United States) Robin Tenney	4	1

=== Fourth qualifier ===
First round
1	(United States) Diane Desfor	6	1	6
8	(United States) Nancy Ornstein	4	6	2
4	(United States) Kay McDaniel	6	4
5	(United States) Kathy Jordan	3	3^{r}
2	(Brazil) Patricia Medrado	7	6
7	(United States) Jeanne DuVall	6	4
3	(United States) Barbara Jordan	6	6
6	(United States) Ann Etheredge	0	0

Second round
(United States) Diane Desfor	6	6
(United States) Kay McDaniel	1	3
(Brazil) Patricia Medrado	6	0	3
(United States) Barbara Jordan	0	6	6

Qualifying competition
(United States) Diane Desfor	2	1
(United States) Barbara Jordan	6	6

=== Fifth qualifier ===
First round
1	(United States) Peanut Louie	6	6
8	(United States) Jean Nachand	3	4
4	(United Kingdom) Belinda Thompson	3	6	6
5	(Switzerland) Susana Maria Villaverde	6	1	4
2	(United States) Gretchen Galt	6	6
7	(United States) Roylee Bailey	4	4
3	(Australia) Sue Saliba	6	6
6	(United States) Jane Preyer	4	4

Second round
(United States) Peanut Louie	6	6
(United Kingdom) Belinda Thompson	3	4
(United States) Gretchen Galt	4	4
(Australia) Sue Saliba	6	6

Qualifying competition
(United States) Peanut Louie	4	6	6
(Australia) Sue Saliba	6	4	3

=== Sixth qualifier ===
First round
1	(United States) Felicia Hutnick	6	5	7
8	(United States) Caroline Lane	4	7	5
4	(United States) Sally Greer	7	6
5	(United States) Sue Stap	6	3
2	(New Zealand) Pauline Elliott	3	6	6
7	(United States) Cynthia-Ann Thomas	6	2	4
3	(Australia) Mary Sawyer	6	6
6	(United States) Robin Khan	2	1

Second round
(United States) Felicia Hutnick	3	1
(United States) Sally Greer	6	6
(New Zealand) Pauline Elliott	4	6	6
(Australia) Mary Sawyer	6	1	4

Qualifying competition
(United States) Sally Greer	6	2	4
(New Zealand) Pauline Elliott	1	6	6

=== Seventh qualifier ===
First round
1	(Australia) Nerida Gregory	6	6
8	(United States) Erin Dignam	2	2
4	(United States) Trey Lewis	6	6	7
5	(United States) Dana Gilbert	7	0	5
2	(Australia) Pamela Baily	6	6
7	(United States) A. Schroeder	2	2
3	(United States) Caroline Stoll	6	6
6	(United States) Anna-Maria Fernandez	1	2

Second round
(Australia) Nerida Gregory	3	6	7
(United States) Trey Lewis	6	2	6
(Australia) Pamela Baily	3	1
(United States) Caroline Stoll	6	6

Qualifying competition
(Australia) Nerida Gregory	0	1
(United States) Caroline Stoll	6	6

=== Eighth qualifier ===
First round
1	(Australia) Vicki Lancaster-Kerr	6	6
8	(United States) Sherry Acker	4	2
4	(United States) Sheila McInerney	6	6
5	(United States) Marlie Buehler	2	0
2	(Australia) Amanda Tobin	6	6
7	(United States) Wendy Burkhart	1	3
3	(United States) Stephanie Tolleson	7	6
6	(United States) Karen Kennington	5	2

Second round
(Australia) Vicki Lancaster-Kerr	1	0
(United States) Sheila McInerney	6	6
(Australia) Amanda Tobin	6	7
(United States) Stephanie Tolleson	3	5

Qualifying competition
(United States) Sheila McInerney	6	6
(Australia) Amanda Tobin	1	1
