= 1980 US Open – Women's singles =

Women's singles
- 1980 US Open

Final
- Champion: (United States) Chris Evert
- Runner-up: (Czechoslovakia) Hana Mandlíková
- Score: 5–7, 6–1, 6–1

Details
- Draw: 96
- Seeds: 16

Events
| Singles | men | women | | boys | girls |
| Doubles | men | women | mixed | boys | girls |
| WC Singles | men | women | quad |
| WC Doubles | men | women | quad |
| Legends | men | women | mixed |
- US Open

Chris Evert-Lloyd defeated Hana Mandlíková in the final, 5–7, 6–1, 6–1 to win the women's singles tennis title at the 1980 US Open. It was her fifth US Open title and eleventh major singles title overall.

Tracy Austin was the defending champion, but lost in the semifinals to Evert in a rematch of the previous year's final.

== Seeds ==
The seeded players are listed below. Chris Evert is the champion; others show the round in which they were eliminated.

1. (United States) Tracy Austin (semifinalist)
2. (United States) Martina Navratilova (fourth round)
3. (United States) Chris Evert (champion)
4. (Australia) Evonne Goolagong (withdrew before the tournament began because of a back injury)
5. (Australia) Wendy Turnbull (third round)
6. (Australia) Dianne Fromholtz (fourth round)
7. (South Africa) Greer Stevens (first round)
8. (United States) Andrea Jaeger (semifinalist)
9. (Czechoslovakia) Hana Mandlíková (runner-up)
10. (Romania) Virginia Ruzici (fourth round)
11. (United States) Kathy Jordan (fourth round)
12. (United Kingdom) Virginia Wade (third round)
13. (United States) Pam Shriver (quarterfinalist)
14. (Argentina) Ivanna Madruga (quarterfinalist)
15. (Netherlands) Betty Stöve (first round)
16. (Czechoslovakia) Regina Maršíková (second round)

== Draw ==
=== Key ===
- Q = Qualifier
- WC = Wild card
- LL = Lucky loser
- r = Retired

=== Finals ===
Quarterfinals
1 | (United States) Tracy Austin | 6 | 6
13 | (United States) Pam Shriver | 2 | 3
3 | (United States) Chris Evert | 7 | 6
(Socialist Federal Republic of Yugoslavia) Mima Jaušovec | 6 | 2
8 | (United States) Andrea Jaeger | 6 | 6
14 | (Argentina) Ivanna Madruga | 1 | 3
(United States) Barbara Hallquist | 2 | 2
9 | (Czechoslovakia) Hana Mandlíková | 6 | 6

Semifinals
1 | (United States) Tracy Austin | 6 | 1 | 1
3 | (United States) Chris Evert | 4 | 6 | 6
8 | (United States) Andrea Jaeger | 1 | 6 | 6^{4}
9 | (Czechoslovakia) Hana Mandlíková | 6 | 3 | 7^{7}

Finals
3 | (United States) Chris Evert | 5 | 6 | 6
9 | (Czechoslovakia) Hana Mandlíková | 7 | 1 | 1

=== Earlier rounds ===
==== Section 1 ====
First round
1 | (United States) Tracy Austin | 6 | 7
(United States) Anne Smith | 2 | 5
(United States) Mary Lou Piatek | 6 | 7
(United States) Ann Kiyomura | 1 | 5
Q | (United States) Lea Antonoplis | 6 | 6
(United States) Jane Stratton | 4 | 4
10 | (Romania) Virginia Ruzici | 6 | 6
(United States) Sherry Acker | 2 | 1

Second round
1 | (United States) Austin | 6 | 6
(United States) Rosemary Casals | 0 | 0
(West Germany) Sylvia Hanika | 6 | 7
(United States) Piatek | 4 | 5
Q | (United States) Antonoplis | 6 | 4 | 4
(United States) Pam Teeguarden | 4 | 6 | 6
(Sweden) Nina Bohm | 0 | 3
10 | (Romania) Ruzici | 6 | 6

Third round
1 | (United States) Austin | 6 | 6
(West Germany) Hanika | 4 | 4
(United States) Teeguarden | 2 | 6 | 3
10 | (Romania) Ruzici | 6 | 2 | 6

Fourth round
1 | (United States) Austin | 6 | 6
10 | (Romania) Ruzici | 4 | 0

==== Section 2 ====
First round
13 | (United States) Pam Shriver | 6 | 6
(United States) Alycia Moulton | 0 | 3
(West Germany) Bettina Bunge | 6 | 6
(United States) Anna-Maria Fernandez | 2 | 3
(Australia) Susan Leo | 6 | 6
(United States) Marita Redondo | 1 | 1
6 | (Australia) Dianne Fromholtz | 7 | 6
(United States) Julie Harrington | 6 | 4

Second round
13 | (United States) Shriver | 6 | 6
(United States) Renee Blount | 1 | 2
(West Germany) Bunge | 6 | 6
(United States) Diane Morrison | 2 | 2
Q | (United States) Elise Burgin | 3 | 4
(Australia) Leo | 6 | 6
Q | (United States) Zina Garrison | 3 | 6 | 4
6 | (Australia) Fromholtz | 6 | 2 | 6

Third round
13 | (United States) Shriver | 6 | 6
(West Germany) Bunge | 3 | 3
(Australia) Leo | 1 | 2
6 | (Australia) Fromholtz | 6 | 6

Fourth round
13 | (United States) Shriver | 3 | 6 | 6
6 | (Australia) Fromholtz | 6 | 1 | 1

==== Section 3 ====
First round
3 | (United States) Chris Evert | 6 | 6
(United States) Kim Sands | 0 | 0
(Australia) Sue Saliba | 6 | 6
(Sweden) Elisabeth Ekblom | 1 | 4
(United States) Susan Mascarin | 6 | 6
Q | (United States) Lisa Doherty | 1 | 0
16 | (Czechoslovakia) Regina Maršíková | 6 | 6
Q | (United Kingdom) Anthea Stewart | 1 | 1

Second round
3 | (United States) Evert | 6 | 6
(United States) Mareen Louie Harper | 3 | 1
(United States) Wendy White | 6 | 6
(Australia) Saliba | 0 | 2
(United States) Mascarin | 6 | 6
Q | (Netherlands) Nanette Schutte | 2 | 4
(United States) JoAnne Russell | 6 | 6
16 | (Czechoslovakia) Maršíková | 2 | 3

Third round
3 | (United States) Evert | 6 | 6
(United States) W. White | 1 | 1
(United States) Mascarin | 2 | 6 | 2
(United States) Russell | 6 | 3 | 6

Fourth round
3 | (United States) Evert | 6 | 6
(United States) Russell | 2 | 1

==== Section 4 ====
First round
11 | (United States) Kathy Jordan | 6 | 6
(United States) Kate Gompert | 3 | 2
(United States) Kathy Horvath | 3 | 6 | 6
(United States) Trey Lewis | 6 | 4 | 2
(Socialist Federal Republic of Yugoslavia) Mima Jaušovec | 6 | 6
(Netherlands) Marcella Mesker | 0 | 2
(United States) Kate Latham | 6 | 7
7 | (South Africa) Greer Stevens | 4 | 6

Second round
11 | (United States) K. Jordan | 6 | 6
(United States) Sharon Walsh | 1 | 4
(United States) Barbara Potter | 6 | 6
(United States) Horvath | 2 | 1
(United States) Beth Norton | 1 | 4
(Socialist Federal Republic of Yugoslavia) Jaušovec | 6 | 6
(United States) Kathy May Teacher | 3 | 1
(United States) Latham | 6 | 6

Third round
11 | (United States) K. Jordan | 7 | 6
(United States) Potter | 6 | 3
(Socialist Federal Republic of Yugoslavia) Jaušovec | 6 | 6
(United States) Latham | 4 | 4

Fourth round
11 | (United States) K. Jordan | 5 | 3
(Socialist Federal Republic of Yugoslavia) Jaušovec | 7 | 6

==== Section 5 ====
First round
(United States) Jeanne DuVall | 6 | 6
(Switzerland) Hana Strachoňová | 2 | 1
(United States) Betsy Nagelsen | 6 | 6
(United Kingdom) Deborah Jevans | 0 | 2
(United States) Stacy Margolin | 6 | 5 | 6
(United States) Lele Forood | 1 | 7 | 1
(United Kingdom) Anne Hobbs | 6 | 6
15 | (Netherlands) Betty Stöve | 4 | 0

Second round
8 | (United States) Andrea Jaeger | 6 | 6
(United States) DuVall | 0 | 2
(United States) Barbara Jordan | 3 | 3
(United States) Nagelsen | 6 | 6
(United States) Margolin | 6 | 6
(United States) Anne White | 1 | 3
(Czechoslovakia) Renáta Tomanová | 6 | 6
(United Kingdom) Hobbs | 3 | 0

Third round
8 | (United States) A. Jaeger | 6 | 6
(United States) Nagelsen | 4 | 2
(United States) Margolin | 3 | 3
(Czechoslovakia) Tomanová | 6 | 6

Fourth round
8 | (United States) A. Jaeger | 6 | 6
(Czechoslovakia) Tomanová | 3 | 0

==== Section 6 ====
First round
14 | (Argentina) Ivanna Madruga | 6 | 6
Q | (United States) Joyce Portman | 1 | 1
(United States) Karen Hantze Susman | 3 | 6 | 6
(South Africa) Tanya Harford | 6 | 2 | 4
(United States) Candy Reynolds | 6 | 6
(United States) Diane Desfor | 3 | 2
LL | (United States) Susie Jaeger | 6 | 6
(United Kingdom) Glynis Coles | 3 | 2

Second round
14 | (Argentina) Madruga | 6 | 6
LL | (United States) Kimberly Jones | 3 | 3
(United States) Janet Newberry | 5 | 1
(United States) Hantze Susman | 7 | 6
(United States) Reynolds | 6 | 6
(South Korea) Lee Duk-hee | 3 | 4
(United States) Laura duPont | 6 | 6
LL | (United States) S. Jaeger | 2 | 1

Third round
14 | (Argentina) Madruga | 6 | 6
(United States) Hantze Susman | 3 | 1
(United States) Reynolds | 1 | 6 | 7
(United States) duPont | 6 | 4 | 5

Fourth round
14 | (Argentina) Madruga | 5 | 6 | 6
(United States) Reynolds | 7 | 3 | 3

==== Section 7 ====
First round
(United States) Renée Richards | 3 | 6 | 6
(United States) Zenda Liess | 6 | 3 | 3
(United States) Roberta McCallum | 6 | 7
(United States) Nancy Yeargin | 3 | 6
LL | (France) Frédérique Thibault | 7 | 6
(Switzerland) Christiane Jolissaint | 6 | 0
12 | (United Kingdom) Virginia Wade | 6 | 6 | 6
(United States) Dana Gilbert | 2 | 7 | 4

Second round
5 | (Australia) Wendy Turnbull | 7 | 6
(United States) Richards | 5 | 4
(United States) McCallum | 1 | 3
(United States) Barbara Hallquist | 6 | 6
LL | (France) Thibault | 6 | 3
(Romania) Lucia Romanov | 7 | 6
(Argentina) Claudia Casabianca | 6 | 3 | 5
12 | (United Kingdom) Wade | 4 | 6 | 7

Third round
5 | (Australia) Turnbull | 5 | 1
(United States) Hallquist | 7 | 6
(Romania) Romanov | 4 | 6 | 6
12 | (United Kingdom) Wade | 6 | 2 | 0

Fourth round
(United States) Hallquist | 6 | 3 | 6
(Romania) Romanov | 3 | 6 | 3

==== Section 8 ====
First round
9 | (Czechoslovakia) Hana Mandlíková | 6 | 6
(United States) Sandy Collins | 3 | 4
(United States) Paula Smith | 6 | 7
(United States) Caroline Stoll | 4 | 6
(United States) Lindsay Morse | 6 | 6
(Romania) Mariana Simionescu | 1 | 1
2 | (United States) Martina Navratilova | 6 | 4 | 6
(Sweden) Lena Sandin | 4 | 6 | 2

Second round
9 | (Czechoslovakia) Mandlíková | 6 | 6
Q | (Argentina) Liliana Giussani | 4 | 0
(South Africa) Rosalyn Fairbank | 6 | 4 | 5
(United States) Smith | 4 | 6 | 7
(United States) Felicia Hutnick | 4 | 1
(United States) Morse | 6 | 6
(United States) Leslie Allen | 1 | 6 | 2
2 | (United States) Navratilova | 6 | 4 | 6

Third round
9 | (Czechoslovakia) Mandlíková | 6 | 6
(United States) Smith | 2 | 3
(United States) Morse | 4 | 1
2 | (United States) Navratilova | 6 | 6

Fourth round
9 | (Czechoslovakia) Mandlíková | 7 | 6
2 | (United States) Navratilova | 6 | 4

| Preceded by 1980 Wimbledon Championships – Women's singles | Grand Slam women's singles | Succeeded by 1980 Australian Open – Women's singles |
