= 1984 French Open – Women's singles qualifying =

Women's singles qualifying
- 1984 French Open

Events
Singles	men	women		boys	girls
Doubles	men	women	mixed	boys	girls
WC Singles	men	women	quad
WC Doubles	men	women	quad
Legends	−45	45+	women
← 1983 ·	French Open	· 1985 →

Players who neither had high enough rankings nor received wild cards to enter the main draw of the annual French Open Tennis Championships participated in a qualifying tournament held in the week before the event.

== Seeds ==
1. (United States) Jean Hepner (first round)
2. (Australia) Pam Whytcross (first round)
3. (Socialist Federal Republic of Yugoslavia) Renata Šašak (qualified)
4. -
5. (West Germany) Andrea Betzner (second round)
6. (Czechoslovakia) Yvona Brzáková (qualifying competition, lucky loser)
7. (United States) Laura Bernstein (first round)
8. (Czechoslovakia) Hana Strachoňová (first round)
9. (Poland) Iwona Kuczyńska (second round)
10. (United States) Stacy Margolin (first round)
11. (Greece) Angeliki Kanellopoulou (qualified)
12. (United Kingdom) Shelley Walpole (second round)
13. (Japan) Kumiko Okamoto (qualifying competition)
14. (Japan) Emiko Okagawa (qualified)
15. (Switzerland) Karin Stampfli (first round)
16. (West Germany) Petra Keppeler (qualified)

== Qualifiers ==
1. (West Germany) Petra Keppeler
2. (Soviet Union) Larisa Neiland
3. (Socialist Federal Republic of Yugoslavia) Renata Šašak
4. (Sweden) Carina Karlsson
5. (Japan) Emiko Okagawa
6. (Soviet Union) Elena Eliseenko
7. (Greece) Angeliki Kanellopoulou
8. (Czechoslovakia) Hana Fukárková

== Lucky losers ==
1. (Czechoslovakia) Yvona Brzáková

== Qualifying draw ==
=== Key ===
- Q = Qualifier
- WC = Wild card
- LL = Lucky loser
- Alt = Alternate
- ITF = ITF entry
- PR = Protected ranking
- SR = Special ranking
- SE = Special exempt
- JE = Junior exempt
- JR = Junior Accelerator Programme entrant
- CO = College Accelerator Programme entrant
- NG = Next Gen Accelerator Program entrant
- w/o = Walkover
- r = Retired
- d = Defaulted

=== First qualifier ===
First round
1	(United States) Jean Hepner	6	2	0
(West Germany) Cornelia Dries	3	6	6
(United States) Karin Huebner	5	2
(United States) Penny Barg	7	6
(Belgium) Ann Gabriel	2	3
(Australia) Annette Gulley	6	6
(France) Emmanuelle Folcher	2	1
16	(West Germany) Petra Keppeler	6	6

Second round
(West Germany) Cornelia Dries	4	3
(United States) Penny Barg	6	6
(Australia) Annette Gulley	5	6	3
16	(West Germany) Petra Keppeler	7	4	6

Qualifying competition
(United States) Penny Barg	3	6	2
16	(West Germany) Petra Keppeler	6	1	6

=== Second qualifier ===
First round
12	(United Kingdom) Shelley Walpole	6	6
(France) Gail Chanfreau	4	1
(Soviet Union) Larisa Neiland	6	6
(United States) Helena Konanz	2	1
(United States) Renee Blount	1	3
(Netherlands) Judith Warringa	6	6
(France) Nathalie Ballet	6	6
8	(Czechoslovakia) Hana Strachoňová	3	3

Second round
12	(United Kingdom) Shelley Walpole	3	7	3
(Soviet Union) Larisa Neiland	6	5	6
(Netherlands) Judith Warringa	6	6
(France) Nathalie Ballet	4	0

Qualifying competition
(Soviet Union) Larisa Neiland	6	6
(Netherlands) Judith Warringa	2	3

=== Third qualifier ===
First round
3	(Socialist Federal Republic of Yugoslavia) Renata Šašak	6	7
(Hungary) Marie Pinterová	4	5
(United States) Donna Rubin	4	2
(Australia) Jenny Byrne	6	6
(France) Cécille Calmette	4	3
(Canada) Hélène Pelletier	6	6
(Czechoslovakia) Lea Plchová	6^{2}	2
13	(Japan) Kumiko Okamoto	7^{7}	6

Second round
3	(Socialist Federal Republic of Yugoslavia) Renata Šašak	6	6
(Australia) Jenny Byrne	2	1
(Canada) Hélène Pelletier	1	2
13	(Japan) Kumiko Okamoto	6	6

Qualifying competition
3	(Socialist Federal Republic of Yugoslavia) Renata Šašak	3	6	7
13	(Japan) Kumiko Okamoto	6	1	5

=== Fourth qualifier ===
First round
9	(Poland) Iwona Kuczyńska	6	4
(United States) Jackie Joseph	4	1^{r}
(France) Béatrice Guéry	3	5
(Sweden) Carina Karlsson	6	7
(United States) Carol Christian	1	7^{7}	9
(United States) Heather Crowe	6	6^{5}	7
(Japan) Naoko Sato	4	3
5	(West Germany) Andrea Betzner	6	6

Second round
9	(Poland) Iwona Kuczyńska	1	6^{8}
(Sweden) Carina Karlsson	6	7^{10}
(United States) Carol Christian	6	6
5	(West Germany) Andrea Betzner	2	4

Qualifying competition
(Sweden) Carina Karlsson	6	6
(United States) Carol Christian	0	2

=== Fifth qualifier ===
First round
6	(Czechoslovakia) Yvona Brzáková	7^{8}	3	6
(Australia) Nerida Gregory	6^{6}	6	2
(Italy) Barbara Rossi	6	3	6
(United States) Mary-Ann Colville	2	6	1
(Sweden) Carin Anderholm	7^{7}	4	6
(United States) Jane Forman	6^{5}	6	4
(United States) Jan Blackstad	0	2
14	(Japan) Emiko Okagawa	6	6

Second round
6	(Czechoslovakia) Yvona Brzáková	7^{7}	7^{7}
(Italy) Barbara Rossi	6^{4}	6^{4}
(Sweden) Carin Anderholm	1	1
14	(Japan) Emiko Okagawa	6	6

Qualifying competition
6	(Czechoslovakia) Yvona Brzáková	4	6^{5}
14	(Japan) Emiko Okagawa	6	7^{7}

=== Sixth qualifier ===
First round
15	(Switzerland) Karin Stampfli	2	5
(Soviet Union) Elena Eliseenko	6	7
(Sweden) Helena Olsson	2	4
(Netherlands) Nanette Schutte	6	6
(France) Cécile Bourdais	3	2
(Sweden) Elisabeth Ekblom	6	6
(France) Nathalie Housset	7^{7}	6
Alt	(United States) Kathy Holton	6^{1}	1

Second round
(Soviet Union) Elena Eliseenko	6	6
(Netherlands) Nanette Schutte	2	1
(Sweden) Elisabeth Ekblom	3	7^{9}	6
(France) Nathalie Housset	6	6^{7}	1

Qualifying competition
(Soviet Union) Elena Eliseenko	6	6
(Sweden) Elisabeth Ekblom	4	3

=== Seventh qualifier ===
First round
7	(United States) Laura Bernstein	6	5	2
(United States) Vicki Beggs	4	7	6
(New Zealand) Brenda Perry	2	4
(West Germany) Renáta Tomanová	6	6
(United States) Lisa Spain	6	6
(United States) Hu Na	4	4
(United States) Kris Kinney	6	4	4
11	(Greece) Angeliki Kanellopoulou	3	6	6

Second round
(United States) Vicki Beggs	6	7^{7}
(West Germany) Renáta Tomanová	2	6^{1}
(United States) Lisa Spain	0	6	3
11	(Greece) Angeliki Kanellopoulou	6	2	6

Qualifying competition
(United States) Vicki Beggs	3	7^{7}	0
11	(Greece) Angeliki Kanellopoulou	6	6^{4}	6

=== Eighth qualifier ===
First round
10	(United States) Stacy Margolin	4	1
(United States) Susan Rimes	6	6
(Canada) Jill Hetherington	6^{3}	1
(Switzerland) Eva Krapl	7^{7}	6
(France) Sabine Lavrerotte	4	6	7
(Sweden) Berit Björk	6	4	9
(Czechoslovakia) Hana Fukárková	6	6
2	(Australia) Pam Whytcross	3	3

Second round
(United States) Susan Rimes	6	6
(Switzerland) Eva Krapl	4	3
(Sweden) Berit Björk	1	5
(Czechoslovakia) Hana Fukárková	6	7

Qualifying competition
(United States) Susan Rimes	3	1
(Czechoslovakia) Hana Fukárková	6	6
