= Robin Harris =

Robin Harris may refer to:

- Robin Harris (comedian) (1953–1990), American comedian and actor
- Robin Harris (author) (born 1952), British author and journalist
- Robin Harris (tennis) (born 1956), American tennis player
