= Billy Nealon =

American tennis player

- Full name: Billy Nealon
- Country (sports): United States
- Born: November 11, 1960 (age 64); Rochester, New York, U.S.
- Plays: Left-handed

Singles
- Career record: 1-10
- Highest ranking: No. 230 (August 13, 1984)

Grand Slam singles results
- US Open: 1R (1980)

Doubles
- Career record: 5-17
- Highest ranking: No. 156 (September 24, 1984)

Grand Slam doubles results
- US Open: 1R (1980)

Billy Nealon (born November 11, 1960) is a former professional tennis player from the United States.

== Biography ==
Billy Nealon was born in Rochester, New York and was introduced to tennis by his mother, Ann, at the age of 6. He was ranked in #1 in the US in the boys 14 and under and remained in the top 10 in the US for the remainder of his years in the juniors. He played collegiate tennis at the University of Southern California and played #1 or #2 singles during his USC tenure.

During college, he began competing on the pro tour. He qualified and played in both the men's singles and doubles main draws at the 1980 US Open. In the singles he came up against ninth seed Peter Fleming in the first round and was beaten in four sets. His career was hampered by a knee injury, which required surgery in 1982 and kept him off the tour until 1984. Reaching a ranking of 156 in doubles, he was a doubles quarter-finalist at Geneva in 1984 and finished runner-up in the doubles at the 1985 Thessaloniki Challenger.

He is a member of the Rochester Tennis Hall of Fame and still lives in the area with his wife Sylvie, working as a tennis coach. He had instilled his passion for tennis to numerous juniors that he has instructed in both Montreal and Rochester NY during his lifetime. In 2015, he was awarded the George Seewagen Award by the Eastern Tennis Association - given to the USTA Eastern teaching professional who exemplifies excellence in competition, sportsmanship and love of the game.
