= Dov Lupi =

Israeli artistic gymnast

- דב לופי
- Nickname: Dubi
- Born: August 24, 1948 (age 78) Sarid, Israel
- Height: 175 cm (5 ft 9 in)

Gymnastics career
- Discipline: Men's artistic gymnastics
- Country represented: Israel

Dov (Dubi) Lupi (Hebrew: דב לופי; born August 24, 1948) is a retired Israeli-American Olympic gymnast who also competed for Washington State University. He competed for Israel in the 1976 Summer Olympics in Montreal, Quebec, Canada, where he was ranked 68th in the individual all-around competition with a score of 106.45 points, and 38th in parallel bars.

He also competed for Team Israel at the 1977 Maccabiah Games, where he had the best overall standing, with a gold medal in the horse and with several silver medals.

He was born and raised on Kibbutz Sarid in Israel.
