= 1981 Seiko Classic =

- Date: 2–8 November
- Edition: 2nd
- Category: Toyota Series (Cat 1)
- Draw: 32S / 16D
- Prize money: $50,000
- Surface: Clay
- Location: Hong Kong

Champions

Singles
- (Australia) Wendy Turnbull

Doubles
- (United States) Ann Kiyomura / (United States) Sharon Walsh
← 1980 ·	Hong Kong Tennis Open	· 1982 →

The 1981 Seiko Classic was a women's professional tennis tournament played on clay courts at the Victoria Park Stadium in Hong Kong and was part of the Toyota Series of the 1981 WTA Tour. It was the second edition of the tournament and took place from 2 November until 8 November 1981. First-seeded Wendy Turnbull won her second consecutive singles title at the event and earned $8,500 first-prize money.

== Finals ==
=== Singles ===
- (Australia) Wendy Turnbull defeated (Italy) Sabina Simmonds 6–3, 6–4

=== Doubles ===
- (United States) Ann Kiyomura / (United States) Sharon Walsh defeated (United Kingdom) Anne Hobbs / (Australia) Susan Leo, 6–3, 6–4
