= June Ferestien =

American tennis player (born 1963)

- Country (sports): United States
- Born: June 19, 1963 (age 61)

Singles

Grand Slam singles results
- US Open: Q3 (1980)

June Ferestien (born June 19, 1963) is an American former professional tennis player.

A native of Newton, Massachusetts, Ferestien was a US Open junior semi-finalist and featured on the professional tour during the 1980s. Her WTA Tour performances included a win over Dianne Fromholtz at the Borden Classic in Tokyo in 1982. and a win over top ten in the world player and Bronze Olympic gold meadalist Manuala Maleeva of Bulgaria in 1980. She also played a season of collegiate tennis for University of Florida.
