= 1977 Maccabiah Games =

10th Maccabiah
- Host city: Tel Aviv, Israel
- Nations: 34
- Athletes: 2,700
- Opening: July 12, 1977
- Torchbearer: Miki Berkovich
- Main venue: Ramat Gan Stadium

At the 10th Maccabiah Games in Israel, more than 2,800 athletes from 34 countries participated in 26 different sports, including chess and bridge and for the first time badminton.

The opening ceremonies were held on July 12, 1977, in Ramat Gan Stadium before a crowd of 50,000 people. The United States won 83 gold medals, 65 silver medals, and 47 bronze medals; Israel was next with 60 gold medals, 70 silver medals, and 60 bronze medals, and South Africa was third with 16 gold medals, seven silver medals, and nine bronze medals.

== History ==
The Maccabiah Games were first held in 1932 in Palestine, then a British Mandate jurisdiction. In 1961, under an independent Israel, they were declared a "Regional Sports Event" by, and under the auspices and supervision of, the International Olympic Committee. Among other Olympic and world champions, swimmer Mark Spitz won 10 Maccabiah gold medals before earning his first of nine Olympic gold medals.

It was the first Maccabiah Games to include a women's judo tournament.

== Notable medalists ==
In basketball, the United States, coached by Hall of Famer Dolph Schayes and with his son Danny Schayes, Ernie Grunfeld, Joel Kramer, Howard Lassoff, and Willie Sims on the team, won the gold medal in basketball, beating Israel 92–91 in the final at Yad Eliahu Stadium. Miki Berkovich, Motti Aroesti, Barry Leibowitz, Boaz Janay, and Steve Kaplan were among the Israeli basketball team's squad.

In track and field, Esther Roth of Israel won the 100 m hurdles in 13.50, and the 200 m race in 24.03. Roth set records in the 100-meter hurdles, 200-meters, and 4×100-meters. Boris (Dov) Djerassi competed for the United States, and won a gold medal in the hammer throw.

In gymnastics, American Sharon Shapiro won five gold medals in individual and team gymnastics, when she was 15 years of age. American Olympian Abie Grossfeld was Team USA's coach. for both men and women. Israeli Olympian Dov Lupi competed for Team Israel, and had the best overall standing, with a gold medal in the horse and with several silver medals.

In swimming, Mexican future Olympian Helen Plaschinski, 14 years old, won gold medals in the 100 and 200 m freestyle. American Olympic bronze medalist Wendy Weinberg won six gold medals and two silver medals. Among her golds were wins in the 200 m freestyle, the 200 m butterfly, the 400 m freestyle, the 800 m freestyle, and a win in the 4 × 100 m medley relay team of which she was captain. Her silver medals were in the 100 m freestyle and the 100 m butterfly.

In fencing, 2-time Olympic bronze medal winner Yves Dreyfus of France won gold medals in individual and team épée. American fencer Al Axelrod won a gold medal in foil. Joel Glucksman won a silver medal in individual saber for the U.S.

In men's tennis, Steve Krulevitz won gold medals in singles and doubles (with Larry Nagler) for the United States, and Nagler also won a silver medal in singles. In women's tennis, South African Ilana Kloss won a silver medal in mixed doubles, American Stacy Margolin won gold, silver, and bronze medals in various tennis competitions, and American Dana Gilbert won a gold medal at 17 years of age. Americans Donna Rubin and Jodi Appelbaum-Steinbauer won silver medals in women's doubles, and Appelbaum-Steinbauer won a bronze medal in women's singles. Robin Tenney competed for the United States in tennis.

In judo, Canadian Olympian Howard Stupp won gold medals in the lightweight division of both freestyle and Greco-Roman. Rena Kanokogi of the United States competed in women's judo, which was included in the Maccabiah Games for the first time.

In soccer, Gad Machnes, Gili Landau, and Eli Cohen played for Israel, which won a gold medal.

Also competing were Canadian sprinter Abigail Hoffman (two-time Pan American Games champion), American tennis player Robin Tenney, American soccer player Seth Roland, and Venezuelan Elizabeth Popper (table tennis Olympian).

== Participating communities ==
The 1977 Games were considered the largest assembly of Jewish athletes to that point in time. Thirty-four nations sent athletes. The Israeli contingent was the largest with 500 members, followed by the United States with 340, Brazil with 166, Australia with 165, France with 149, South Africa with 146, Italy with 118, Argentina with 103, and Mexico with 102 athletes. Great Britain sent its largest group thus far with 124 athletes. Canada had 92 athletes. Due to international boycotts, Rhodesia was excluded from the games for the first time in seven Maccabiads and South Africa was barred from competing in several events. Despite this, four Rhodesian lawn bowlers and tennis players competed as individual athletes. Bolivia, Iran, New Zealand, and Norway sent single-member teams. The Soviet Union, much of Eastern Europe, and Arab nations boycotted the games.

The United States won 83 gold medals, 65 silver medals, and 47 bronze medals; Israel was next with 60 gold medals, 70 silver medals, and 60 bronze medals, and South Africa was third with 16 gold medals, seven silver medals, and nine bronze medals.

* Host nation (Israel)

10th Maccabiah Games medal table
Rank	Nation	Gold	Silver	Bronze	Total
1	United States (USA)	83	65	47	195
2	Israel (ISR)*	60	70	60	190
3	South Africa (RSA)	16	7	9	32
4	Netherlands (NED)	11	9	3	23
5	France (FRA)	10	6	15	31
6	Canada (CAN)	8	8	14	30
7	Australia (AUS)	6	13	10	29
8	West Germany (FRG)	6	3	4	13
9	Great Britain (GBR)	3	7	6	16
10	Sweden (SWE)	2	4	6	12
11	Brazil (BRA)	2	3	5	10
12	Mexico (MEX)	1	4	3	8
13	Italy (ITA)	1	3	3	7
14	Argentina (ARG)	1	0	4	5
15	Austria (AUT)	1	0	1	2
16	Greece (GRE)	1	0	0	1
17	Denmark (DEN)	0	2	0	2
18	U.S. Virgin Islands (ISV)	0	0	1	1
Totals (18 entries)		212	204	191	607

Source: "Maccabiah Games Medal Standings". The Montreal Star. July 21, 1977. p. 40 – via Newspapers.com.

Also participating in the games were:

- Belgium
- Bolivia
- Chile
- Colombia
- Costa Rica
- Ecuador
- Finland
- India
- Iran
- Ireland
- Jamaica
- Japan
- New Zealand
- Norway
- Peru
- Rhodesia
- Spain
- Switzerland
- Uruguay
- Venezuela

== Commemoration ==
Israel issued three stamps to commemorate the 10th Maccabiah Games. The stamps show in turn a shot putter, a fencer, and two judoka in a judo contest.
