= Mike Margolin =

American tennis player

- Full name: Michael Margolin
- Country (sports): United States
- Plays: Left-handed

Grand Slam mixed doubles results
- US Open: 1R (1979, 1980, 1981)

Michael Margolin is an American tennis player.

Margolin, a left-hander, was a collegiate tennis player for the USC Trojans in the early 1970s. He is the brother of tennis player Stacy Margolin, who he partnered with in mixed doubles at three US Open tournaments.

In 1999, he was appointed head tennis coach at Beverly Hills High School, of which he is a graduate.
