= 1980 US Open – Mixed doubles =

Mixed doubles
- 1980 US Open

Final
- Champions: (Australia) Wendy Turnbull (United States) Marty Riessen
- Runners-up: (Netherlands) Betty Stöve (South Africa) Frew McMillan
- Score: 7–5, 6–2

Details
- Draw: 32
- Seeds: 8

Events
Singles	men	women		boys	girls
Doubles	men	women	mixed	boys	girls
WC Singles	men	women	quad
WC Doubles	men	women	quad
Legends	men	women	mixed
- US Open

Greer Stevens and Bob Hewitt were the defending champions but lost in the quarterfinals to Candy Reynolds and Steve Denton.

Wendy Turnbull and Marty Riessen won in the final 7–5, 6–2 against Betty Stöve and Frew McMillan.

== Seeds ==
Champion seeds are indicated in bold text while text in italics indicates the round in which those seeds were eliminated.

1. (Australia) **Wendy Turnbull** / (United States) **Marty Riessen (champions)**
2. (Netherlands) Betty Stöve / (South Africa) Frew McMillan (final)
3. (United States) Anne Smith / (South Africa) Kevin Curren (semifinals)
4. (South Africa) Greer Stevens / (South Africa) Bob Hewitt (quarterfinals)
5. (United States) Rosemary Casals / (India) Anand Amritraj (first round)
6. (United States) Candy Reynolds / (United States) Steve Denton (semifinals)
7. (United States) Ann Kiyomura / (United States) Tom Leonard (quarterfinals)
8. (United States) Betsy Nagelsen / (Paraguay) Francisco González (first round)

== Draw ==
Key

- Q = Qualifier
- WC = Wild card
- LL = Lucky loser
- Alt = Alternate
- ITF = ITF entry
- PR = Protected ranking
- SR = Special ranking
- SE = Special exempt
- JE = Junior exempt
- JR = Junior Accelerator Programme entrant
- CO = College Accelerator Programme entrant
- NG = Next Gen Accelerator Program entrant
- w/o = Walkover
- r = Retired
- d = Defaulted

=== Final ===
Final
1	(Australia) **Wendy Turnbull** (United States) **Marty Riessen**	**7**	**6**
2	(Netherlands) Betty Stöve (South Africa) Frew McMillan	5	2

=== Top half ===
First round
1	(Australia) **W Turnbull** (United States) **M Riessen**	**6**	4	**6**
(Czechoslovakia) R Maršíková (United States) R Tyler	2	**6**	1
(West Germany) **R Tomanová** (United States) **V Van Patten**	**6**	3	**6**
(Switzerland) H Strachoňová (Austria) P Feigl	3	**6**	2
(South Africa) T Harford (Australia) J James	**7**	3	2
(South Africa) **R Fairbank** (United States) **B Nichols**	6	**6**	**6**
(United States) R Blount (United States) T Graham	3	2
7	(United States) **A Kiyomura** (United States) **T Leonard**	**6**	**6**
4	(South Africa) **G Stevens** (South Africa) **B Hewitt**	**6**	**6**
(United States) J Harrington (Finland) L Palin	1	3
(United States) **B Jordan** (United States) **T Delatte**	2	**6**	**6**
(United States) S Margolin (United States) M Margolin	**6**	3	1
(United States) **P Johnson** (United States) **R Van't Hof**	**6**	**6**
(United States) K Jones (United States) G Malin	4	3
(United States) G Glasgow (United States) J Van Linge	3	3
6	(United States) **C Reynolds** (United States) **S Denton**	**6**	**6**

Second round
1	(Australia) **W Turnbull** (United States) **M Riessen**	**6**	**6**
(West Germany) R Tomanová (United States) V Van Patten	1	3
(South Africa) R Fairbank (United States) B Nichols	**7**	5	5
7	(United States) **A Kiyomura** (United States) **T Leonard**	5	**7**	**7**
4	(South Africa) **G Stevens** (South Africa) **B Hewitt**	**6**	**6**
(United States) B Jordan (United States) T Delatte	0	3
(United States) P Johnson (United States) R Van't Hof	**6**	3	4
6	(United States) **C Reynolds** (United States) **S Denton**	3	**6**	**6**

Quarterfinals
1	(Australia) **W Turnbull** (United States) **M Riessen**	**6**	3	**7**
7	(United States) A Kiyomura (United States) T Leonard	3	**6**	6
4	(South Africa) G Stevens (South Africa) B Hewitt	5	**6**	2
6	(United States) **C Reynolds** (United States) **S Denton**	**7**	4	**6**

Semifinals
1	(Australia) **W Turnbull** (United States) **M Riessen**	2	**7**	**6**
6	(United States) C Reynolds (United States) S Denton	**6**	5	3

=== Bottom half ===
First round
5	(United States) R Casals (India) A Amritraj	2	4
(West Germany) **B Bunge** (United States) **F McNair**	**6**	**6**
(United States) **R Fox** (United States) **V Winitsky**	**6**	**6**
(United States) A Moulton (United States) B Walts	0	3
(United States) **S Acker** (United States) **C Leeds**	**7**	**7**
(United States) A Buchanan (Zimbabwe) H Ismail	5	5
(United States) J Russell (United States) B Scanlon	2	4
3	(United States) **A Smith** (South Africa) **K Curren**	**6**	**6**
8	(United States) B Nagelsen (Paraguay) F González	4	4
(Romania) **L Romanov** (United States) **S Krulevitz**	**6**	**6**
(United States) **P Smith** (United States) **M Purcell**	**6**	**6**
(Australia) P Whytcross (United States) J Austin	2	4
(Argentina) C Casabianca (United States) R Fagel	3	1
(United Kingdom) **A Hobbs** (United States) **E Fromm**	**6**	**6**
(United States) R Richards (Romania) I Năstase	6	**6**	1
2	(Netherlands) **B Stöve** (South Africa) **F McMillan**	**7**	3	**6**

Second round
(West Germany) B Bunge (United States) F McNair	3	**6**	4
(United States) **R Fox** (United States) **V Winitsky**	**6**	2	**6**
(United States) S Acker (United States) C Leeds	4	**6**	4
3	(United States) **A Smith** (South Africa) **K Curren**	**6**	2	**6**
(Romania) L Romanov (United States) S Krulevitz	1	4
(United States) **P Smith** (United States) **M Purcell**	**6**	**6**
(United Kingdom) A Hobbs (United States) E Fromm	**6**	6	4
2	(Netherlands) **B Stöve** (South Africa) **F McMillan**	4	**7**	**6**

Quarterfinals
(United States) R Fox (United States) V Winitsky	2	**7**	5
3	(United States) **A Smith** (South Africa) **K Curren**	**6**	6	**7**
(United States) P Smith (United States) M Purcell	5	**6**	4
2	(Netherlands) **B Stöve** (South Africa) **F McMillan**	**7**	3	**6**

Semifinals
3	(United States) A Smith (South Africa) K Curren	4	5
2	(Netherlands) **B Stöve** (South Africa) **F McMillan**	**6**	**7**
