= Brenda Perry =

New Zealand tennis player (born 1957)

Brenda Perry MNZM
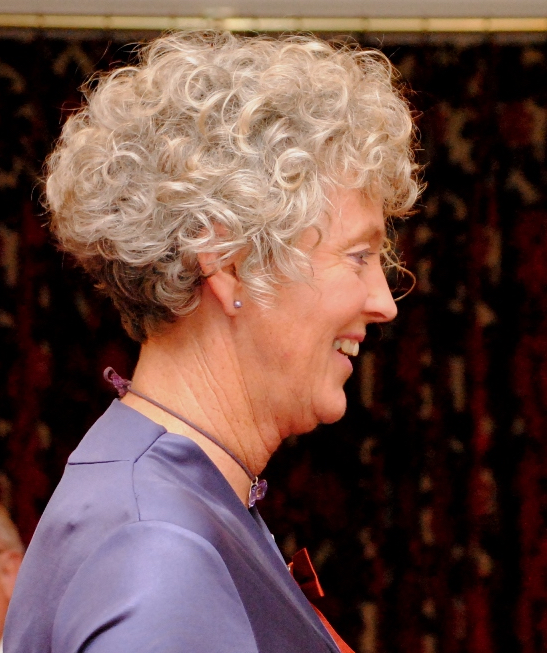
- Perry in 2012
- Country (sports): New Zealand
- Born: 4 October 1957 (age 69)

Grand Slam singles results
- Australian Open: Q1 (1981)
- French Open: Q1 (1984)
- Wimbledon: Q2 (1984)
- US Open: Q1 (1978, 1979, 1981)

Grand Slam doubles results
- French Open: 1R (1985)
- Wimbledon: 3R (1979)
- US Open: 1R (1979)

Grand Slam mixed doubles results
- Wimbledon: 1R (1984, 1985)

Brenda Perry MNZM (born 4 October 1957) is a New Zealand former professional tennis player.

== Biography ==
While competing on tour, Perry attained the top New Zealand ranking and represented her country in six Federation Cup ties, between 1978 and 1980. She registered Federation Cup wins over Wendy Barlow, Lee Duk-hee and Alejandra Vallejo. One of her losses came against Chris Evert in Berlin in 1980, where she had to forfeit to the American in the second set due to an ankle injury.

Her best performance in a grand slam tournament was a third round appearance in women's doubles at the 1979 Wimbledon Championships, partnering Wendy Gilchrist.

In the 2012 Queen's Birthday and Diamond Jubilee Honours, Perry was appointed a Member of the New Zealand Order of Merit, for services to women's tennis. In 2019, she was named the tournament co-director of the Wuhan Open.
