= Lucia Romanov-Stark =

Romanian tennis player

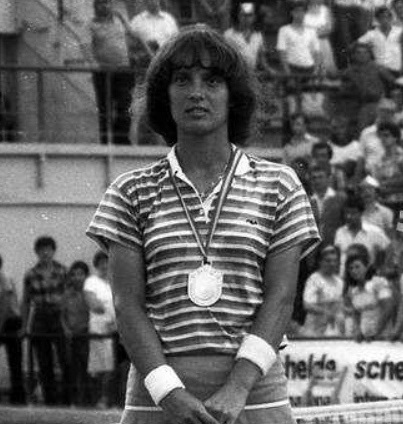
- Full name: Lucia Romanov-Stark
- Country (sports): Romania
- Residence: La Jolla, United States
- Born: 28 April 1959 (age 67) Bucharest, Romania
- Height: 1.65 m (5 ft 5 in)
- Turned pro: 1979
- Retired: 1985
- Plays: Right-handed
- Prize money: $118,494

Singles
- Career record: 55–77
- Career titles: 0 WTA, 0 ITF
- Highest ranking: No. 30 (1983)

Grand Slam singles results
- French Open: QF (1982)
- Wimbledon: 3R (1982)
- US Open: 4R (1980)

Doubles
- Career record: 32–65
- Career titles: 0 WTA, 0 ITF

Grand Slam doubles results
- Wimbledon: 2R (1981)
- US Open: 2R (1980, 1982, 1983)

Grand Slam mixed doubles results
- French Open: SF (1982)
- Wimbledon: 2R (1983)
- US Open: 2R (1980, 1984)

Lucia Romanov-Stark (née Romanov; born 28 April 1959) is a former professional tennis player from Romania and former member of the Romania Fed Cup team. In 1983, she reached her highest WTA singles ranking of world number 30.

== Junior Grand Slam finals ==
=== Singles: 1 final (1 runner-up) ===
| Result | Year | Tournament | Surface | Opponent | Score |
|---|---|---|---|---|---|
| Loss | 1976 | US Open | Hard | (South Africa) Marise Kruger | 3–6, 5–7 |

== Personal life ==
Lucia has a twin sister, Maria, with whom she played team doubles for the Romania Fed Cup team. In 1984 she married American Jim Stark and moved to the United States. The couple have a son, Talon Stark, who is an American mathematician.
