= Belinda Thompson =

British tennis player (born 1956)

- Country (sports): United Kingdom
- Born: 3 May 1956 (age 68)

Singles

Grand Slam singles results
- Australian Open: 1R (1975)
- French Open: 1R (1977)
- Wimbledon: 2R (1977, 1979)
- US Open: Q2 (1977)

Doubles

Grand Slam doubles results
- Wimbledon: 2R (1975, 1976, 1979)

Belinda Thompson (born 3 May 1956) is a British former professional tennis player.

Thompson, a British junior champion, is a native of Manchester and was named Stockport Sports Personality of the Year in 1976. She appeared twice in the second round of the Wimbledon Championships.
