= Vicki Beggs =

American tennis player

- Country (sports): United States
- Born: March 25, 1957 (age 68) Palm Beach, Florida, U.S.
- College: University of Miami
- Prize money: US$ 10,362

Singles
- Career titles: 0
- Highest ranking: No. 337 (Feb 2, 1987)

Grand Slam singles results
- French Open: Q3 (1984, 1985)
- US Open: Q2 (1980)

Doubles
- Career titles: 0

Vicki Beggs (born March 25, 1957) is an American former professional tennis player.

A native of Palm Beach, Florida, Beggs played collegiate tennis for the University of Miami and competed on the professional tour in the 1980s. She qualified for the French Open and US Open during her career.
