= Mike Shore =

American tennis player

- Country (sports): United States
- Born: January 20, 1957 (age 69) Mercer Island, Washington, U.S.
- Turned pro: 1978

Singles
- Career record: 3–9
- Highest ranking: No. 236 (December 31, 1978)

Grand Slam singles results
- US Open: 2R (1980)

Doubles
- Career record: 2–8

Grand Slam doubles results
- US Open: 1R (1978, 1979, 1980)

Mike Shore (born January 20, 1957) is an American former professional tennis player.

Shore was born and raised in Mercer Island, Washington and played collegiate tennis at the University of Alabama, where he earned All-SEC honors in 1977.

From 1978 to 1981, Shore competed on the professional tour and featured in three editions of the US Open, including 1980 when he reached the singles second round. On the Grand Prix circuit his best performance was a quarter-final appearance at a tournament in Costa Rica in 1979, beating Francisco González en route.
