= Donna Rubin =

American tennis player (born 1959)

- Country (sports): United States
- Born: October 5, 1959 (age 66)
- Prize money: US$ 10,207

Singles
- Highest ranking: No. 156

Grand Slam singles results
- French Open: Q1 (1982, 1984)
- Wimbledon: Q1 (1982)
- US Open: Q2 (1980)

Grand Slam doubles results
- French Open: 1R (1984)
Medal record
Maccabiah Games
Silver medal – second place	1977 Israel	Women's Doubles
Gold medal – first place	1981 Israel	Women's Doubles

Donna Rubin (born October 5, 1959) is an American former professional tennis player. She represented the U.S. at the 1977 Maccabiah Games in Israel, winning a silver medal in doubles with Jodi Appelbaum-Steinbauer, and at the 1981 Maccabiah Games, she and Dana Gilbert won a gold medal in women's doubles. She played doubles at the French Open in 1984.

== Biography ==
A New York native, Rubin played on the boys' team at Rye Neck High School. She was a member of the United States Junior Federation Cup side.

She represented the U.S. at the 1977 Maccabiah Games in Israel, where she won a silver medal in doubles with Jodi Appelbaum-Steinbauer. She played collegiate tennis for Stanford University and won the deciding doubles match which secured the 1978 AIAW championships. In 1980 she was named an All-American. At the 1981 Maccabiah Games, she and Dana Gilbert won a gold medal in the women's doubles.

Rubin was active on the professional tour in the early 1980s. She qualified for the main draw of the 1981 U.S. Clay Court Championships and won her first round match over Kim Sands, before losing in the next round to the top-seed Andrea Jaeger. In 1984 she featured in the women's doubles main draw of the French Open with Mary-Ann Colville.
