= Larry Davidson (tennis) =

American tennis player

- Country (sports): United States
- Born: August 21, 1955 (age 70)

Singles
- Career record: 0–2
- Highest ranking: No. 284 (Dec 26, 1979)

Grand Slam singles results
- US Open: 1R (1980)

Larry Davidson (born August 21, 1955) is an American former professional tennis player.

Davidson grew up in New Rochelle, New York and during the 1970s played collegiate tennis at Pennsylvania's Swarthmore College. He won an NCAA Division III doubles championship in 1976 (with John Irwin) and was the Middle Atlantic Conferences singles champion in 1977. After graduating he competed on the professional tour and made a main draw appearance at the 1980 US Open, where he lost in the first round to 16th seed Victor Amaya.
