= 1980 US Open – Men's doubles =

Men's doubles
- 1980 US Open

Final
- Champion: (United States) Bob Lutz (United States) Stan Smith
- Runner-up: (United States) John McEnroe (United States) Peter Fleming
- Score: 7–6, 3–6, 6–1, 3–6, 6–3

Details
- Draw: 64
- Seeds: 16

Events
Singles	men	women		boys	girls
Doubles	men	women	mixed	boys	girls
WC Singles	men	women	quad
WC Doubles	men	women	quad
Legends	men	women	mixed
← 1979 ·	US Open	· 1981 →

The men's doubles tournament at the 1980 US Open was held from August 26 to September 7, 1980, on the outdoor hard courts at the USTA National Tennis Center in New York City, United States. Bob Lutz and Stan Smith won the title, defeating John McEnroe and Peter Fleming in the final.

== Seeds ==
1. (United States) John McEnroe / (United States) Peter Fleming (final)
2. (United States) Bob Lutz / (United States) Stan Smith (champions)
3. (United States) Marty Riessen / (United States) Sherwood Stewart (semifinals)
4. (Australia) Paul McNamee / (Australia) Peter McNamara (semifinals)
5. (South Africa) Bob Hewitt / (South Africa) Frew McMillan (quarterfinals)
6. (Poland) Wojciech Fibak / (Czechoslovakia) Ivan Lendl (third round)
7. (United States) Bruce Manson / (United States) Brian Teacher (first round)
8. (Romania) Ilie Năstase / (Netherlands) Tom Okker (third round)
9. (United States) Victor Amaya / (United States) Hank Pfister (second round)
10. (United States) Kevin Curren / (United States) Steve Denton (third round)
11. (Switzerland) Heinz Günthardt / (Australia) Fred Stolle (quarterfinals)
12. (United States) Andrew Pattison / (United States) Butch Walts (quarterfinals)
13. (India) Anand Amritraj / (India) Vijay Amritraj (first round)
14. (United States) Terry Moor / (United States) Eliot Teltscher (first round)
15. (Paraguay) Francisco González / (United States) Johan Kriek (second round)
16. (United States) Tom Gullikson / (United States) Tim Gullikson (third round)

== Draw ==
=== Key ===
- Q = Qualifier
- WC = Wild card
- LL = Lucky loser
- Alt = Alternate
- ITF = ITF entry
- PR = Protected ranking
- SR = Special ranking
- SE = Special exempt
- JE = Junior exempt
- JR = Junior Accelerator Programme entrant
- CO = College Accelerator Programme entrant
- NG = Next Gen Accelerator Program entrant
- w/o = Walkover
- r = Retired
- d = Defaulted

=== Finals ===
Quarterfinals
1	(United States) Peter Fleming (United States) John McEnroe	6	6
(Austria) Peter Feigl (Chile) Jaime Fillol	4	4
4	(Australia) Paul McNamee (Australia) Peter McNamara	7	6
11	(Switzerland) Heinz Günthardt (Australia) Fred Stolle	6	3
12	(United States) Andrew Pattison (United States) Butch Walts	7	3	4
3	(United States) Marty Riessen (United States) Sherwood Stewart	6	6	6
5	(South Africa) Bob Hewitt (South Africa) Frew McMillan	6	5
2	(United States) Bob Lutz (United States) Stan Smith	7	7

Semifinals
1	(United States) Peter Fleming (United States) John McEnroe	4	6	7	6
4	(Australia) Paul McNamee (Australia) Peter McNamara	6	3	6	1
3	(United States) Marty Riessen (United States) Sherwood Stewart	2	1	1
2	(United States) Bob Lutz (United States) Stan Smith	6	6	6

Final
1	(United States) Peter Fleming (United States) John McEnroe	6	6	1	6	3
2	(United States) Bob Lutz (United States) Stan Smith	7	3	6	3	6

=== Top half ===
==== Section 1 ====
First round
1	(United States) P Fleming (United States) J McEnroe	6	7
(Australia) C Dibley (United States) F McNair	3	5
(United States) R Meyer (United States) G Malin	7	6
(United States) M Purcell (United States) M Shore	6	2
(South Africa) B Bertram (South Africa) B Mitton	6	6
(Australia) C Miller (United States) L Shiras	1	1
9	(United States) V Amaya (United States) H Pfister	6	6
(United States) T Cain (United States) M Grant	1	3
(United States) E Fromm (United States) J Hayes	6	4	6
13	(India) A Amritraj (India) V Amritraj	4	6	3
(Austria) P Feigl (Chile) J Fillol	7	7
(United States) M Doyle (United States) L Stefanki	6	6
(United States) C Dunk (United States) C Hooper	6	6
(Colombia) C Behar (United States) G Oropez	1	2
6	(Poland) W Fibak (Czechoslovakia) I Lendl	6	1	7
(United States) G Hardie (United States) T Waltke	1	6	6

Second round
1	(United States) P Fleming (United States) J McEnroe	6	6
(United States) R Meyer (United States) G Malin	2	3
(South Africa) B Bertram (South Africa) B Mitton	7	6
9	(United States) V Amaya (United States) H Pfister	6	0
(United States) E Fromm (United States) J Hayes	7	4	3
(Austria) P Feigl (Chile) J Fillol	6	6	6
(United States) C Dunk (United States) C Hooper	6	6
6	(Poland) W Fibak (Czechoslovakia) I Lendl	7	7

Third round
1	(United States) P Fleming (United States) J McEnroe	6	6
(South Africa) B Bertram (South Africa) B Mitton	2	3
(Austria) P Feigl (Chile) J Fillol	7	3	6
6	(Poland) W Fibak (Czechoslovakia) I Lendl	6	6	3

Quarterfinals
1	(United States) P Fleming (United States) J McEnroe	6	6
(Austria) P Feigl (Chile) J Fillol	4	4

==== Section 2 ====
First round
4	(Australia) P McNamee (Australia) P McNamara	7	6
(India) S Menon (South Africa) R Trogolo	6	4
(France) P Dominguez (France) T Tulasne	3	6	7
(United States) S Giammalva (United States) J Lapidus	6	3	6
(United States) B Scanlon (United States) D Stockton	6	6
(United States) G Martinez (United States) G Petrovic	4	3
16	(United States) Ti Gullikson (United States) To Gullikson	6	7
13	(United States) R Fagel (United States) C Owens	3	6
11	(Switzerland) H Günthardt (Australia) F Stolle	6	6
(United States) T Graham (United States) B Nichols	1	4
(United States) J Benson (United States) T Garcia	6	6
(United States) J Arias (United States) R Hightower	4	4
(Australia) O Davidson (Australia) J Newcombe	6	6
(Czechoslovakia) S Birner (Sweden) J Norbäck	4	3
8	(Romania) I Năstase (Netherlands) T Okker	6	6
(United States) T Delatte (United States) S Krulevitz	4	1

Second round
4	(Australia) P McNamee (Australia) P McNamara	6	6
(France) P Dominguez (France) T Tulasne	1	2
(United States) B Scanlon (United States) D Stockton	5	0
16	(United States) Ti Gullikson (United States) To Gullikson	7	6
11	(Switzerland) H Günthardt (Australia) F Stolle	7	6
(United States) J Benson (United States) T Garcia	6	2
(Australia) O Davidson (Australia) J Newcombe	6	3
8	(Romania) I Năstase (Netherlands) T Okker	7	6

Third round
4	(Australia) P McNamee (Australia) P McNamara	7	6
16	(United States) Ti Gullikson (United States) To Gullikson	6	3
11	(Switzerland) H Günthardt (Australia) F Stolle	6	6
8	(Romania) I Năstase (Netherlands) T Okker	1	2

Quarterfinals
4	(Australia) P McNamee (Australia) P McNamara	7	6
11	(Switzerland) H Günthardt (Australia) F Stolle	6	3

=== Bottom half ===
==== Section 3 ====
First round
(United Kingdom) A Jarrett (United Kingdom) J Lloyd	7	6
7	(United States) B Manson (United States) B Teacher	5	3
(United States) J Sadri (United States) T Wilkison	6	2	7
(United States) P Rennert (United States) R Van't Hof	1	6	6
(United States) J Geraghty (Zimbabwe) H Ismail	6	6
(Ecuador) A Gómez (Paraguay) V Pecci	3	4
12	(United States) A Pattison (United States) B Walts	6	6
(Puerto Rico) M Diaz (United States) R Hubbard	4	4
(Australia) S Docherty (Australia) J James	6	7
14	(United States) T Moor (United States) E Teltscher	3	6
(United States) S Davis (United States) B Testerman	6	6
(United States) M Fishbach (Canada) H Fritz	2	3
(United States) J Delaney (United States) R Fisher	6	7
(United States) J McManus (United States) J Osborne	3	5
3	(United States) M Riessen (United States) S Stewart	6	6
(United States) M Dickson (United States) M Gandolfo	4	4

Second round
(United Kingdom) A Jarrett (United Kingdom) J Lloyd	6	1	3
(United States) J Sadri (United States) T Wilkison	2	6	6
(United States) J Geraghty (Zimbabwe) H Ismail	2	4
12	(United States) A Pattison (United States) B Walts	6	6
(Australia) S Docherty (Australia) J James	4	2
(United States) S Davis (United States) B Testerman	6	6
(United States) J Delaney (United States) R Fisher	4	2
3	(United States) M Riessen (United States) S Stewart	6	6

Third round
(United States) J Sadri (United States) T Wilkison	3	6
12	(United States) A Pattison (United States) B Walts	6	7
(United States) S Davis (United States) B Testerman	5	1
3	(United States) M Riessen (United States) S Stewart	7	6

Quarterfinals
12	(United States) A Pattison (United States) B Walts	7	3	4
3	(United States) M Riessen (United States) S Stewart	6	6	6

==== Section 4 ====
First round
8	(South Africa) B Hewitt (South Africa) F McMillan	6	6
(South Africa) R Moore (United States) E van Dillen	4	4
(Australia) B Drewett (Australia) W Maher	4	7	6
(South Africa) D Schneider (South Africa) J Yuill	6	6	4
(United States) C Graebner (United States) C Pasarell	6	6
(United States) L Davidson (United States) C Leeds	4	2
15	(Paraguay) F González (United States) J Kriek	6	7
(Israel) S Glickstein (United States) V Van Patten	3	5
10	(United States) K Curren (United States) S Denton	5	6	6
(United States) F Buehning (United States) B Willenborg	7	1	3
(United States) T Leonard (United States) J Van Linge	6	6
(India) R Krishnan (Finland) L Palin	4	3
(United States) J Austin (United States) V Winitsky	6	4	6
(United States) D Dowlen (United States) B Nealon	3	6	4
2	(United States) B Lutz (United States) S Smith	6	6
(United States) B Maze (United States) D Ralston	1	2

Second round
8	(South Africa) B Hewitt (South Africa) F McMillan	6	1
(Australia) B Drewett (Australia) W Maher	2	0^{r}
(United States) C Graebner (United States) C Pasarell	6	2	6
15	(Paraguay) F González (United States) J Kriek	3	6	3
10	(United States) K Curren (United States) S Denton	7	7
(United States) T Leonard (United States) J Van Linge	6	6
(United States) J Austin (United States) V Winitsky	3	1
2	(United States) B Lutz (United States) S Smith	6	6

Third round
8	(South Africa) B Hewitt (South Africa) F McMillan	6	6
(United States) C Graebner (United States) C Pasarell	3	4
10	(United States) K Curren (United States) S Denton	7	6	1
2	(United States) B Lutz (United States) S Smith	6	7	6

Quarterfinals
8	(South Africa) B Hewitt (South Africa) F McMillan	6	5
2	(United States) B Lutz (United States) S Smith	7	7
