= Dominique Beillan =

French tennis player

- Country (sports): France
- Born: 24 May 1955 (age 69)

Singles

Grand Slam singles results
- French Open: 1R (1979, 1980)
- Wimbledon: Q1 (1978)
- US Open: Q1 (1977, 1978, 1979)

Doubles

Grand Slam doubles results
- French Open: 2R (1971)

Grand Slam mixed doubles results
- French Open: SF (1977, 1980)

Dominique Beillan (born 24 May 1955) is a French former professional tennis player.

Beillan made regular appearance at the French Open through the 1970s and early 1980s. Her best performance were in mixed doubles, reaching the semi-finals twice, with Omar Laimina in 1977 and Patrice Dominguez in 1980. She fell in the first round in both of her two singles main draw appearances, which included a three set loss in 1979 to former finalist Renáta Tomanová.
