= Susie Jaeger =

American tennis player

- Country (sports): United States
- Born: March 29, 1962 (age 62)
- Height: 5 ft 6 in (168 cm)
- Plays: Right-handed

Singles

Grand Slam singles results
- Wimbledon: 1R (1981)
- US Open: 2R (1980)

Doubles

Grand Slam doubles results
- US Open: 1R (1980)

Susie Jaeger (born March 29, 1962) is an American former professional tennis player.

== Biography ==
Born in Chicago, Illinois, to a Swiss father and German mother, Jaeger is the elder sister of tennis player Andrea and attended Stevenson High School. She was beaten in only one match as a high school player and won three successive IHSA singles titles, the first girl to have done so. Ranked fourth in the country as an amateur, she received a tennis scholarship to Stanford University, where she was a member of two NCAA championship winning teams.

Jaeger competed on the professional tour during the 1980s, but was hampered by injuries. She featured in a grand slam main draw for the first time as an injury replacement for Evonne Goolagong at the 1980 US Open and won through to the second round. In 1981 she made the main draw at Wimbledon, losing in the first round to Kim Sands.

A political science graduate from Stanford, Jaeger's ex-husband is tennis player Scott Davis, who she met at university.
