= 1980 Seiko Classic =

- Date: 3–9 November
- Edition: 1st
- Category: Colgate Series (A)
- Draw: 32S / 16D
- Prize money: $50,000
- Surface: Hard
- Location: Hong Kong
- Venue: Victoria Park Stadium

Champions

Singles
- (Australia) Wendy Turnbull

Doubles
- (Australia) Wendy Turnbull / (United States) Sharon Walsh
Hong Kong Tennis Open	· 1981 →

The 1980 Seiko Classic was a women's professional tennis tournament played on hard courts at the Victoria Park Stadium in Hong Kong and was part of the Colgate Series of the 1980 WTA Tour. It was the inaugural edition of the event and took place from 3 November until 9 November 1980. First-seeded Wendy Turnbull won the singles title.

== Finals ==
=== Singles ===
- (Australia) Wendy Turnbull defeated (United States) Mareen Louie Harper 6–2, 6–0

=== Doubles ===
- (Australia) Wendy Turnbull / (United States) Sharon Walsh defeated (United States) Penny Johnson / (Chile) Silvana Urroz, 6–1, 6–2
