= 1980 US Open – Men's singles =

Men's singles
- 1980 US Open

Final
- Champion: (United States) John McEnroe
- Runner-up: (Sweden) Björn Borg
- Score: 7–6^{(7–4)}, 6–1, 6–7^{(5–7)}, 5–7, 6–4

Details
- Draw: 128
- Seeds: 16

Events
Singles	men	women		boys	girls
Doubles	men	women	mixed	boys	girls
WC Singles	men	women	quad
WC Doubles	men	women	quad
Legends	men	women	mixed
← 1979 ·	US Open	· 1981 →

Defending champion John McEnroe defeated Björn Borg in the final, 7–6^{(7–4)}, 6–1, 6–7^{(5–7)}, 5–7, 6–4 to win the men's singles tennis title at the 1980 US Open. It was his second US Open singles title and second major singles title overall. The final is often ranked among the best matches in tennis history, and was central to the Borg–McEnroe rivalry. It was the first successful US Open men's singles title defense since the start of the Open Era in 1968, and a rematch of the pair's Wimbledon final earlier in the summer.

== Seeds ==
The seeded players are listed below. John McEnroe is the champion; others show the round in which they were eliminated.

1. (Sweden) Björn Borg (finalist)
2. (United States) John McEnroe (champion)
3. (United States) Jimmy Connors (semifinalist)
4. (Argentina) Guillermo Vilas (fourth round)
5. (United States) Vitas Gerulaitis (second round)
6. (United States) Gene Mayer (first round)
7. (United States) Harold Solomon (fourth round)
8. (United States) Eddie Dibbs (second round)
9. (United States) Peter Fleming (second round)
10. (Czechoslovakia) Ivan Lendl (quarterfinalist)
11. (United States) Roscoe Tanner (quarterfinalist)
12. (Argentina) José Luis Clerc (first round)
13. (United States) Brian Gottfried (fourth round)
14. (Poland) Wojciech Fibak (quarterfinalist)
15. (France) Yannick Noah (fourth round)
16. (United States) Victor Amaya (third round)

== Draw ==
=== Key ===
- Q = Qualifier
- WC = Wild card
- LL = Lucky loser
- r = Retired

=== Finals ===
Quarterfinals
1	(Sweden) Björn Borg	6	3	4	7	6
11	(United States) Roscoe Tanner	4	6	6	5	3
14	(Poland) Wojciech Fibak	6	2	6	1	6^{5}
(South Africa) Johan Kriek	4	6	3	6	7^{7}
(United States) Eliot Teltscher	1	6	3	0
3	(United States) Jimmy Connors	6	3	6	6
10	(Czechoslovakia) Ivan Lendl	6	3	2	5
2	(United States) John McEnroe	4	6	6	7

Semifinals
1	(Sweden) Björn Borg	4	4	6	6	6
(South Africa) Johan Kriek	6	6	1	1	1
3	(United States) Jimmy Connors	4	7	6	3	6^{3}
2	(United States) John McEnroe	6	5	0	6	7^{7}

Final
1	(Sweden) Björn Borg	6^{4}	1	7^{7}	7	4
2	(United States) John McEnroe	7^{7}	6	6^{5}	5	6

=== Section 1 ===
First round
1	(Sweden) Borg	6	6	6
(Argentina) Aubone	1	4	1
(United States) Sadri	6	4	6	6
(Brazil) Soares	2	6	4	4
(United States) Scanlon	2	4	6	6	7
(United Kingdom) Feaver	6	6	3	3	6
(Australia) McNamara	6	6	6
(Socialist Federal Republic of Yugoslavia) Ostoja	1	1	0
(Ecuador) Gómez	6	6	4
(United States) Saviano	3	3	0	r
(United States) Purcell	7	6	6
(United States) Smith	6	4	0
(United States) Manson	6	6	7
(India) Menon	1	2	5
15	(France) Noah	6	6	6
(South Africa) Schneider	1	0	3

Second round
1	(Sweden) Borg	7	6	2	6
(United States) Sadri	5	2	6	0
(United States) Scanlon	6	0	5	2
(Australia) McNamara	3	6	7	6
(Ecuador) Gómez	3	5	6	6	4
(United States) Purcell	6	7	2	3	6
(United States) Manson	7	6	0	2
15	(France) Noah	6	7	6	6

Third round
1	(Sweden) Borg	7^{7}	1	6	6
(Australia) McNamara	6^{2}	6	2	0
(United States) Purcell	6	2	4	4
15	(France) Noah	4	6	6	6

Fourth round
1	(Sweden) Borg	6	6	6
15	(France) Noah	3	3	0

=== Section 2 ===
First round
11	(United States) Tanner	6	6	6
(South Africa) Moore	3	4	1
(United States) Arias	6	6	6	6
(South Africa) Sauer	2	7	2	2
(United States) Van Dillen	7	6	6
(United States) Malin	6	2	3
(India) Krishnan	6	6	3	6
(United States) Austin	4	4	6	1
(United States) Teacher	7	6	6
(Mexico) Ramírez	6	1	2
(Israel) Glickstein	7	6	6
(United States) Riessen	5	1	1
(India) Amritraj	7	6	6
(Canada) Fritz	5	2	3
8	(United States) Dibbs	5	2	7	6	6
(United States) Lutz	7	6	5	0	2

Second round
11	(United States) Tanner	6	6	6
(United States) Arias	3	3	0
(United States) Van Dillen	6	6	1	7
(India) Krishnan	4	3	6	6
(United States) Teacher	6	3	6	4	6
(Israel) Glickstein	4	6	3	6	3
(India) Amritraj	7	0	4	6	6
8	(United States) Dibbs	5	6	6	2	1

Third round
11	(United States) Tanner	7	6	6
(United States) Van Dillen	6	1	2
(United States) Teacher	6	6	7	6
(India) Amritraj	7	4	6	2

Fourth round
11	(United States) Tanner	6	6	5	6
(United States) Teacher	3	4	7	2

=== Section 3 ===
First round
4	(Argentina) Vilas	6	6	6
(Australia) Maher	0	1	2
(United States) Hayes	7	2	3	6	6
(Australia) James	5	6	6	2	1
(United States) Van't Hof	6	6	7
(United States) Hardie	3	3	5
(Paraguay) González	6	7	6
(Australia) Rocavert	2	5	2
(South Africa) Trogolo	7	6	3	6
(Peru) Maynetto	5	1	6	4
(United States) Winitsky	5	7	3	6	7
(Chile) Fillol Sr.	7	5	6	3	6
(Austria) Feigl	6	4	6	7	7
(France) Bedel	4	6	7	6	6
14	(Poland) Fibak	6	0	6	6
(United States) Benson	4	6	3	4

Second round
4	(Argentina) Vilas	6	6	6
(United States) Hayes	2	4	4
(United States) Van't Hof	6	5	3
(Paraguay) González	7	7	6
(South Africa) Trogolo	3	4	1
(United States) Winitsky	6	6	6
(Austria) Feigl	4	6	6	4	3
14	(Poland) Fibak	6	2	3	6	6

Third round
4	(Argentina) Vilas	3	3	6	6	6
(Paraguay) González	6	6	4	4	2
(United States) Winitsky	6	1	1	6
14	(Poland) Fibak	3	6	6	7

Fourth round
4	(Argentina) Vilas	6	3	4	3
14	(Poland) Fibak	3	6	6	6

=== Section 4 ===
First round
9	(United States) Fleming	6	6	3	6
(United States) Nealon	4	1	6	2
(South Africa) Kriek	7	6	6
(Czechoslovakia) Birner	5	4	0
(United States) Giammalva	6	7	6
(Netherlands) Okker	2	6	3
(Finland) Palin	6	7	6	6
(United States) Kohlberg	7	5	2	4
(Switzerland) Günthardt	6	6	6
(New Zealand) Parun	4	2	3
(United Kingdom) Mottram	6	6	6
(United States) Garcia	0	3	2
(United States) Pfister	7	2	7	6
(United States) Cain	5	6	5	3
5	(United States) Gerulaitis	6	6	6
(United States) Van Patten	3	4	0

Second round
9	(United States) Fleming	4	2	0
(South Africa) Kriek	6	6	6
(United States) Giammalva	6	6	7
(Finland) Palin	4	2	5
(Switzerland) Günthardt	6	2	4
(United Kingdom) Mottram	7	6	6
(United States) Pfister	6	6	3	1	7
5	(United States) Gerulaitis	3	2	6	6	6

Third round
(South Africa) Kriek
(United States) Giammalva	DEF
(United Kingdom) Mottram	7	4	6	3	6
(United States) Pfister	6	6	4	6	4

Fourth round
(South Africa) Kriek	6	5	6	6
(United Kingdom) Mottram	4	7	3	4

=== Section 5 ===
First round
(Italy) Ocleppo	2	7	4
6	(United States) Mayer	6	6	2	r
(United States) Shore	7	7	6
(Australia) Docherty	6	6	4
(Paraguay) Pecci Sr.	4	6	6	6
(Australia) Whitecross	6	2	2	2
(United States) Teltscher	6	6	6
(United States) Davis	2	4	4
(United States) Willenborg	6	6	6	5	7
(Australia) McNamee	7	3	3	7	5
(Australia) Case	5	6	6	6
(South Africa) Bertram	7	4	1	3
(United States) Gullikson	6	6	6
(United States) Graham	3	4	4
13	(United States) Gottfried	6	6	6	6
(Australia) Carter	7	2	1	3

Second round
(Italy) Ocleppo	6	6	6
(United States) Shore	4	0	3
(Paraguay) Pecci Sr.	4	1	3
(United States) Teltscher	6	6	6
(United States) Willenborg	3	2	4
(Australia) Case	6	6	6
(United States) Gullikson	3	2	6
13	(United States) Gottfried	6	6	7

Third round
(Italy) Ocleppo	5	0	2
(United States) Teltscher	7	6	6
(Australia) Case	0	7	2	4
13	(United States) Gottfried	6	6	6	6

Fourth round
(United States) Teltscher	6	6	6
13	(United States) Gottfried	4	2	1

=== Section 6 ===
First round
(South Africa) Mitton	6	6	4	2	7
12	(Argentina) Clerc	3	2	6	6	5
(Chile) Ayala	6	3	6	3	6
(United States) Maze	4	6	3	6	3
(United States) Giammalva Jr.	3	6	6	6
(United States) Fisher	6	1	2	2
(United States) Buehning	6	3	6	7	6
(Bolivia) Martinez	2	6	7	5	4
(United States) Stewart	7	6	6
(United States) Taygan	6	2	4
(United States) Moor	4	7	7	3	7
(United States) Stockton	6	6	6	6	6
(United States) Walts	6	6	4	6
(Australia) Drewett	4	2	6	4
3	(United States) Connors	6	6	6
(United States) Freeman	2	2	2

Second round
(South Africa) Mitton	6	6	6
(Chile) Ayala	3	1	3
(United States) Giammalva Jr.	6	4	6	6
(United States) Buehning	2	6	4	4
(United States) Stewart	2	6	4
(United States) Moor	6	7	6
(United States) Walts	3	1	3
3	(United States) Connors	6	6	6

Third round
(South Africa) Mitton	6	2	6	6
(United States) Giammalva Jr.	3	6	2	3
(United States) Moor	4	1	1
3	(United States) Connors	6	6	6

Fourth round
(South Africa) Mitton	6	4	4
3	(United States) Connors	7	6	6

=== Section 7 ===
First round
7	(United States) Solomon	6	6	6
(Sweden) Norbäck	2	4	4
(Romania) Năstase	6	6	4	6
(France) Dominguez	4	1	6	2
(United States) Rennert	7	6	6
(United States) Gandolfo	5	2	1
(New Zealand) Simpson	6	6	2	7
(United States) Leach	3	3	6	6
(United States) Grant	7	6	7
(Ecuador) Ycaza	5	1	6
(France) Tulasne	2	6
(United States) Leonard	6	6	r
(United States) Mayotte	6	6	6
(United States) Mitchell	3	1	1
10	(Czechoslovakia) Lendl	6	6	7
(United States) Mayotte	4	3	6

Second round
7	(United States) Solomon	6	6	6
(Romania) Năstase	2	2	2
(United States) Rennert	4	6	6	3
(New Zealand) Simpson	6	0	7	6
(United States) Grant	3	2	7	6	3
(France) Tulasne	6	6	5	0	6
(United States) Mayotte	4	4	4
10	(Czechoslovakia) Lendl	6	6	6

Third round
7	(United States) Solomon	6	6	4	6	6
(New Zealand) Simpson	7	3	6	0	2
(France) Tulasne	2	0	1
10	(Czechoslovakia) Lendl	6	6	6

Fourth round
7	(United States) Solomon	1	0	0
10	(Czechoslovakia) Lendl	6	6	6

=== Section 8 ===
First round
16	(United States) Amaya	6	6	7
(United States) Davidson	4	2	6
(United States) Fagel	6	6	6
(United States) Leeds	4	2	0
(France) Portes	6	6	6
(South Africa) Yuill	2	4	2
(United States) Wilkison	4	6	6	7
(United States) Gullikson	6	0	2	5
(United States) Hooper	6	6	6
(United States) Shiras	2	1	3
(United States) Meyer	6	6	3	6
(United States) Waltke	4	2	6	3
(United States) Krulevitz	7	7	1	6
(Zimbabwe) Pattison	6	6	6	2
2	(United States) McEnroe	6	6	6
(France) Roger-Vasselin	3	4	1

Second round
16	(United States) Amaya	7	7	6
(United States) Fagel	5	5	1
(France) Portes	7	6	3	6
(United States) Wilkison	5	2	6	3
(United States) Hooper	3	3	4
(United States) Meyer	6	6	6
(United States) Krulevitz	6	0	2
2	(United States) McEnroe	7	6	6

Third round
16	(United States) Amaya	3	6	6	3
(France) Portes	6	2	7	6
(United States) Meyer	1	1	6	2
2	(United States) McEnroe	6	6	4	6

Fourth round
(France) Portes	2	4	2
2	(United States) McEnroe	6	6	6

Preceded by 1979 Wimbledon Championships – Men's singles	Grand Slam men's singles	Succeeded by 1980 Australian Open – Men's singles
