= Jodi Appelbaum-Steinbauer =

American tennis player

Jodi Appelbaum
- Full name: Jodi Appelbaum-Steinbauer
- Country (sports): United States
- Born: April 7, 1956 (age 68)
- Height: 5 ft 5 in (165 cm)
- College: University of Miami

Singles

Grand Slam singles results
- US Open: 2R (1981)
Medal record
Maccabiah Games
Silver medal – second place	1977 Tel Aviv	Women's doubles
Bronze medal – third place	1977 Tel Aviv	Women's singles

Jodi Appelbaum-Steinbauer (born April 7, 1956) is an American former professional tennis player. She was a USTA national collegiate doubles champion in 1977, won a bronze medal in singles and a silver medal in doubles for the United States at the 1977 Maccabiah Games in Israel.

She played collegiate tennis for the Miami Hurricanes at the University of Miami, where she was inducted into the University of Miami Sports Hall of Fame.

== Biography ==
Born and raised in Miami, Florida, Appelbaum-Steinbauer earned All-American honors in each of her four years of varsity tennis for the Miami Hurricanes at the University of Miami, and was the USTA national collegiate doubles champion with Terry Salganik in 1977.

Appelbaum-Steinbauer played on the professional tour after graduating in 1978 and qualified as a lucky loser for the 1981 US Open main draw, where she won her first round match against Elizabeth Smylie.

A member of the UM Sports Hall of Fame, Appelbaum is the current Tournament Director of the Junior Orange Bowl.

Appelbaum-Steinbauer is Jewish, and represented the United States at the 1977 Maccabiah Games in Israel, winning a bronze medal in singles and a silver medal in doubles with Donna Rubin. Her daughter Julie was also a 2013 Maccabiah Games competitor in golf.
