= 1980 US Open – Women's doubles =

Women's doubles
- 1980 US Open

Final
- Champions: (United States) Billie Jean King (Czechoslovakia) Martina Navratilova
- Runners-up: (United States) Pam Shriver (Netherlands) Betty Stöve
- Score: 7–6^{(7–2)}, 7–5

Details
- Draw: 48
- Seeds: 8

Events
Singles	men	women		boys	girls
Doubles	men	women	mixed	boys	girls
WC Singles	men	women	quad
WC Doubles	men	women	quad
Legends	men	women	mixed
← 1979 ·	US Open	· 1981 →

Betty Stöve and Wendy Turnbull were the defending champions but they competed with different partners that year, Stöve with Pam Shriver and Turnbull with Rosemary Casals.

Casals and Turnbull lost in the quarterfinals to Andrea Jaeger and Regina Maršíková.

Shriver and Stöve lost in the final 7–6^{(7–2)}, 7–5 in the final against Billie Jean King and Martina Navratilova.

== Seeds ==
Champion seeds are indicated in bold text while text in italics indicates the round in which those seeds were eliminated. Five seeded teams (and eleven non-seeded teams) received byes into the second round.

1. (United States) **Billie Jean King** / (Czechoslovakia) **Martina Navratilova (champions)**
2. (United States) Kathy Jordan / (United States) Anne Smith (semifinals)
3. (United States) Rosemary Casals / (Australia) Wendy Turnbull (quarterfinals)
4. (United States) Pam Shriver / (Netherlands) Betty Stöve (final)
5. (United States) Candy Reynolds / (United States) Paula Smith (quarterfinals)
6. (United States) Andrea Jaeger / (Czechoslovakia) Regina Maršíková (semifinals)
7. (United States) Chris Evert-Lloyd / (Romania) Virginia Ruzici (second round)
8. (South Africa) Greer Stevens / (United Kingdom) Virginia Wade (quarterfinals)

== Draw ==
=== Key ===
- Q = Qualifier
- WC = Wild card
- LL = Lucky loser
- Alt = Alternate
- SE = Special exempt
- PR = Protected ranking
- ITF = ITF entry
- JE = Junior exempt
- w/o = Walkover
- r = Retired
- d = Defaulted
- SR = Special ranking

=== Finals ===
Semifinals

Final

1
- (United States) **Billie Jean King**
- (Czechoslovakia) **Martina Navratilova**
**6**
**6**

6
- (United States) Andrea Jaeger
- (Czechoslovakia) Regina Maršíková
2
3

1
- (United States) **Billie Jean King**
- (Czechoslovakia) **Martina Navratilova**
**7^{7}**
**7**

4
- (United States) Pam Shriver
- (Netherlands) Betty Stöve
6^{2}
5

4
- (United States) **Pam Shriver**
- (Netherlands) **Betty Stöve**
**7**
**6**

2
- (United States) Kathy Jordan
- (United States) Anne Smith
6
3

=== Top half ===
==== Section 1 ====
First round

Second round

Third round

Quarterfinals

1
- (United States) **B J King**
- (Czechoslovakia) **M Navratilova**
**6**
3
**7**

- (United States) L Forood
- (United States) B Jordan
4
3

- (United States) K May-Teacher
- (United States) P Teeguarden
3
**6**
6

- (United States) **K May-Teacher**
- (United States) **P Teeguarden**
**6**
**6**

1
- (United States) **B J King**
- (Czechoslovakia) **M Navratilova**
**6**
**6**

(Socialist Federal Republic of Yugoslavia) **M Jaušovec**
(United States) **R Richards**
**6**
1
**6**

(Socialist Federal Republic of Yugoslavia) M Jaušovec
(United States) R Richards
4
2

- (United States) C Copeland
- (United States) S Jaeger
1
**6**
1

(Socialist Federal Republic of Yugoslavia) **M Jaušovec**
(United States) **R Richards**
**6**
4
**6**

- (Australia) C O'Neil
- (Sweden) M Wikstedt
3
**6**
1

1
- (United States) **B J King**
- (Czechoslovakia) **M Navratilova**
**6**
**6**

- (United States) L duPont
- (South Africa) I Kloss
1
5

8
- (South Africa) G Stevens
- (United Kingdom) V Wade
2
3

- (West Germany) **B Bunge**
- (United States) **J Russell**
**6**
**7**

- (West Germany) **B Bunge**
- (United States) **J Russell**
**6**
**6**

- (United States) L Doherty
- (United States) J Preyer
1
2

- (West Germany) B Bunge
- (United States) J Russell
4
2

8
- (South Africa) **G Stevens**
- (United Kingdom) **V Wade**
**6**
**6**

- (United States) S Acker
- (United States) R McCallum
2
6

- (United States) R Fox
- (United States) P Johnson
1
3

8
- (South Africa) **G Stevens**
- (United Kingdom) **V Wade**
**6**
**7**

8
- (South Africa) **G Stevens**
- (United Kingdom) **V Wade**
**6**
**6**

==== Section 2 ====
First round

Second round

Third round

Quarterfinals

3
- (United States) **R Casals**
- (Australia) **W Turnbull**
**6**
**6**

- (New Zealand) C Newton
- (Australia) J Walker
5
**7**
4

- (United States) A Henricksson
- (United States) K Jones
3
3

- (United States) **A Henricksson**
- (United States) **K Jones**
**7**
6
**6**

3
- (United States) **R Casals**
- (Australia) **W Turnbull**
**6**
**7**

- (United States) P Louie
- (United States) M Redondo
4
5

- (United States) **P Louie**
- (United States) **M Redondo**
3
**6**
**6**

- (Australia) S Leo
- (Australia) K Pratt
1
2

- (United States) L Allen
- (United States) D Morrison
**6**
2
2

- (United States) **L Allen**
- (United States) **D Morrison**
**6**
**6**

3
- (United States) R Casals
- (Australia) W Turnbull
2
4

6
- (United States) **A Jaeger**
- (Czechoslovakia) **R Maršíková**
**6**
**6**

- (Switzerland) **C Jolissaint**
- (Argentina) **I Madruga**
4
**6**
**6**

- (United States) **K Horvath**
- (Romania) **L Romanov**
**6**
4
**6**

- (United States) K Horvath
- (Romania) L Romanov
**6**
2
1

- (United States) E Burgin
- (United States) S Mascarin
4
**6**
4

- (Switzerland) C Jolissaint
- (Argentina) I Madruga
1
**6**
5

6
- (United States) **A Jaeger**
- (Czechoslovakia) **R Maršíková**
**6**
2
**7**

- (United States) A Moulton
- (United States) M L Piatek
4
1

- (United States) J Harrington
- (Australia) E Little
3
1

6
- (United States) **A Jaeger**
- (Czechoslovakia) **R Maršíková**
**6**
**6**

6
- (United States) **A Jaeger**
- (Czechoslovakia) **R Maršíková**
**6**
**6**

=== Bottom half ===
==== Section 3 ====
First round

Second round

Third round

Quarterfinals

7
- (United States) C Evert-Lloyd
- (Romania) V Ruzici
2
**6**
4

- (United States) **A Kiyomura**
- (United States) **B Nagelsen**
**6**
**6**

- (United States) **A Kiyomura**
- (United States) **B Nagelsen**
**6**
4
**6**

- (Japan) N Sato
- (Chile) S Urroz
2
0

- (United States) A Kiyomura
- (United States) B Nagelsen
**6**
0
4

- (United States) **D Desfor**
- (United States) **B Hallquist**
2
**6**
**6**

- (United States) **D Desfor**
- (United States) **B Hallquist**
**6**
4
**6**

- (United States) L Antonoplis
- (United States) A Buchanan
4
**7**
3

- (South Africa) R Fairbank
- (United States) S Margolin
3
**6**
4

- (South Africa) **R Fairbank**
- (United States) **S Margolin**
**6**
5
**6**

- (United States) D Desfor
- (United States) B Hallquist
1
4

- (Czechoslovakia) **H Mandlíková**
- (Czechoslovakia) **R Tomanová**
**7**
**7**

4
- (United States) **P Shriver**
- (Netherlands) **B Stöve**
**6**
**6**

- (United States) F Hutnick
- (United States) L Morse
5
5

- (Czechoslovakia) **H Mandlíková**
- (Czechoslovakia) **R Tomanová**
**6**
6
**6**

- (Italy) D Porzio
- (France) F Thibault
3
**7**
3

- (Czechoslovakia) H Mandlíková
- (Czechoslovakia) R Tomanová
4
**6**
2

- (Sweden) N Bohm
- (Sweden) E Ekblom
4
**6**
3

4
- (United States) **P Shriver**
- (Netherlands) **B Stöve**
**6**
2
**6**

- (United States) **A M Fernandez**
- (United States) **K Latham**
**6**
3
**6**

- (United States) A M Fernandez
- (United States) K Latham
4
3

4
- (United States) **P Shriver**
- (Netherlands) **B Stöve**
**6**
**6**

==== Section 4 ====
First round

Second round

Third round

Quarterfinals

5
- (United States) **C Reynolds**
- (United States) **P Smith**
**7**
**6**

- (United States) S Collins
- (United States) J DuVall
5
4

- (South Africa) T Harford
- (United States) S Walsh
6
4

- (South Africa) **T Harford**
- (United States) **S Walsh**
**7**
**6**

5
- (United States) **C Reynolds**
- (United States) **P Smith**
**6**
**6**

- (Argentina) R Giscafré
- (Brazil) C Monteiro
**6**
0
5

- (Netherlands) M Mesker
- (Netherlands) N Schutte
2
2

- (Netherlands) **M Mesker**
- (Netherlands) **N Schutte**
4
**6**
**7**

- (Netherlands) **M Mesker**
- (Netherlands) **N Schutte**
**6**
**6**

- (United States) A White
- (United States) N Yeargin
2
4

5
- (United States) C Reynolds
- (United States) P Smith
6
2

- (United Kingdom) G Coles
- (Australia) S Saliba
6
4

2
- (United States) **K Jordan**
- (United States) **A Smith**
**7**
**6**

- (United Kingdom) **A Hobbs**
- (United Kingdom) **D Jevans**
**7**
**6**

- (United Kingdom) **A Hobbs**
- (United Kingdom) **D Jevans**
**6**
5
**6**

- (United States) K Sands
- (United States) C Stoll
0
**7**
2

- (United Kingdom) A Hobbs
- (United Kingdom) D Jevans
2
5

2
- (United States) **K Jordan**
- (United States) **A Smith**
**6**
**7**

- (United States) R Blount
- (Switzerland) H Strachoňová
1
3

- (United States) J Stratton
- (Australia) P Whytcross
1
0

2
- (United States) **K Jordan**
- (United States) **A Smith**
**6**
**6**

2
- (United States) **K Jordan**
- (United States) **A Smith**
**6**
**6**
