= Silvana Urroz =

Chilean tennis player

- Country (sports): Chile
- Born: 21 February 1955
- Died: 10 August 1996 (aged 41)
- Plays: Right-handed

Singles
- Highest ranking: No. 117 (1978)

Grand Slam singles results
- French Open: 2R (1977)
- Wimbledon: Q2 (1977)
- US Open: Q3 (1978)

Doubles

Grand Slam doubles results
- French Open: 1R (1973, 1977, 1979, 1980)
- Wimbledon: 1R (1980)
- US Open: 1R (1979, 1980, 1981)

Grand Slam mixed doubles results
- French Open: 2R (1980)
- Wimbledon: 3R (1978, 1979)

Silvana Urroz (21 February 1955 — 10 August 1996) was a Chilean professional tennis player.

== Biography ==
Urroz, daughter of World Cup footballer Francisco Urroz, played collegiate tennis for Lamar University in Texas and was a member of the Chile Federation Cup team from 1977 to 1978. She reached a best world ranking of 117.

Most of Urroz's grand slam appearances came in doubles, but she qualified for the singles main draw of the 1977 French Open and won her first round match against Glynis Coles. In 1980 she had a first round win in Nagoya, which for 38-years remained the last WTA Tour match won by a Chilean woman. She made the mixed doubles third round at Wimbledon twice and was a WTA Tour doubles finalist at the 1980 Seiko Classic in Hong Kong.

Urroz died of cervical cancer in 1996 at the age of 41.

Continuing the family sporting tradition, Urroz's niece Manuela plays field hockey for Chile, while her nephew Francisco has represented the Chile national rugby union team.

== WTA Tour finals ==
=== Doubles: 1 (0–1) ===
Result	No.	Date	Tournament	Tier	Surface	Partner	Opponents	Score
Loss	1.	Nov 1980	Seiko Classic, Hong Kong	$50,000 (Colgate)	Hard	(United States) Penny Johnson	(Australia) Wendy Turnbull (United States) Sharon Walsh	1–6, 2–6
