= Kathy Mueller Rohan =

American tennis player

Kathy Mueller Rohan (née Mueller) is an American former tennis player, collegiality for Trenton State College, then professionally. She was the winner of the Broderick Award in 1977, given to the nation's top female collegiate tennis player.

== Early years ==
Mueller attended Glen Ridge High School, in Glen Ridge, New Jersey, graduating in 1974. She was a four-year starter on the basketball team, but her best sport was tennis, where she played the first singles position and won all 18 of her matches as a senior. Her athletic abilities earned her a position on the school's "Mt. Rushmore", signifying the four top athletes, male or female in the school's history. She was inducted into the school's athletic Hall of Fame in 2008. At that time, her 18–0 record as a senior still stood as a school record.

== College ==
Mueller attended Trenton State College (now The College of New Jersey). She also played the first singles position for the tennis team, and never lost a match in her four years, going 96–0 in her collegiate career. She was named an All-American in 1977 and 1978 (all divisions). While at Trenton, she was the inaugural winner of the Broderick Award, (now the Honda Sports Award) as the nation's best female collegiate tennis player, in 1977.

In 1993, she was inducted into The College of New Jersey Athletic Hall of Fame.

== Professional ==
Mueller played in the Women's Professional Tour in 1979 and 1980, reaching a ranking of 150 in the world.
