= Diane Morrison =

American tennis player

- Full name: Diane Morrison Shropshire
- Country (sports): United States
- Born: August 11, 1958 (age 67)

Singles

Grand Slam singles results
- Australian Open: 2R (1980)
- Wimbledon: 2R (1980)
- US Open: 3R (1979)

Doubles

Grand Slam doubles results
- Australian Open: 1R (1980)
- Wimbledon: 2R (1981)
- US Open: 2R (1980)

Diane Morrison Shropshire (born August 11, 1958) is an American former professional tennis player from the United States.

== Biography ==
Morrison, who attended Beverly Hills High School, received an academic scholarship to Stanford University. Despite not being recruited, she was accepted onto the tennis team and was twice the AIAW doubles champion, partnering Susan Hagey in both 1976 and 1977. She earned All-American selection in 1976, 1977 and 1978.

Graduating from Stanford with a degree majoring in mathematics, Morrison turned professional in 1979. She made the third round of the 1979 US Open. At the end of 1979 she toured Australia and had a win over reigning Australian Open champion Chris O'Neil in Kooyong, as well as making the quarter-finals of the New South Wales Open. She featured in the main draw at Wimbledon in three editions of the tournament.

Her last season on tour was in 1981 and she then concentrated on studying, completing a Doctor of Medicine at UCLA. Since the early 1990s she has worked as an anesthesiologist in Philadelphia.

Morrison is African-American. She is married to noted attorney, author and sports academic Kenneth Shropshire.
