= Robin Harris (tennis) =

American tennis player

- Country (sports): United States
- Born: April 13, 1956 (age 68)
- Height: 5 ft 3 in (160 cm)

Singles

Grand Slam singles results
- French Open: 1R (1978)
- Wimbledon: 2R (1978)
- US Open: 2R (1977)

Doubles

Grand Slam doubles results
- French Open: 2R (1978)

Robin Harris (born April 13, 1956) is an American former professional tennis player.

A native of La Jolla, Harris briefly played varsity tennis for San Diego City College and was the only female member of the team. She was active on tour in the 1970s, featuring in main draws at the French Open and Wimbledon.

In 1976, she had an indirect role in the Renée Richards controversy, Harris was the player defeated in a tournament final by Richards, and after the match, Richards was outed as transgender by a reporter.
