= Felicia Hutnick =

American tennis player

- Country (sports): United States
- Born: July 20, 1957 (age 67)

Singles

Grand Slam singles results
- Australian Open: 1R (1980)
- Wimbledon: Q2 (1980)
- US Open: 2R (1980)

Doubles

Grand Slam doubles results
- Australian Open: 1R (1980)
- Wimbledon: 2R (1980)
- US Open: 3R (1979, 1981)

Felicia Hutnick (born July 20, 1957) is an American former professional tennis player.

Hutnick, the daughter of a minor league baseball player, grew up in the state of Connecticut. She attended Rollins College in the late 1970s, where she was a three-time NCAA Division I All-American.

While competing on the professional tour she made two appearances in the round of 16 at the US Open in doubles and featured in the singles main draw three times. She also played at the Australian Open and Wimbledon.

Hutnick now lives in Omaha, Nebraska and competes in doubles tournaments with daughter Teresa, with the pair earning the nation's top ranking for a mother-daughter combination.
