= Stacy Margolin =

American tennis player (born 1959)

- Country (sports): United States
- Residence: Ojai, California, U.S.
- Born: April 5, 1959 (age 66); Beverly Hills, California, U.S.
- Turned pro: 1979 (age 19)
- Plays: Left-handed
- Prize money: US$149,689

Singles
- Career record: 63–92
- Career titles: 1 WTA, 0 ITF
- Highest ranking: No. 18 (1979)

Grand Slam singles results
- French Open: 3R (1982)
- Wimbledon: 3R (1980)
- US Open: 4R (1978)

Doubles
- Career record: 30–94
- Career titles: 0 WTA, 0 ITF

Grand Slam doubles results
- French Open: 3R (1981)
- Wimbledon: 2R (1979, 1980, 1981, 1983)
- US Open: 2R (1979, 1980, 1984)
Medal record
Maccabiah Games
| Gold medal – first place | 1977 Tel Aviv | Mixed doubles |
| Silver medal – second place | 1977 Tel Aviv | Singles |

Stacy Margolin (born April 5, 1959) is an American former professional tennis player in the WTA tour and the ITF world tour from 1979 to 1987 whose career-high world singles ranking is No. 18 (career-high end of season ranking of No. 25 in 1979). In her eight professional seasons, Margolin competed in a total of twenty-five grand slam championships, which includes several appearances at Wimbledon, the US Open, and the French Open. She won a gold medal at the 1977 Maccabiah Games in Israel.

Margolin was a talented junior player, competing in numerous national tournaments, including multiple appearances at the Ojai Tennis Tournament. She played for the University of Southern California during her collegiate career and led the Trojans to a national championship. In her 192 career singles matches and 124 career doubles matches, Margolin won one title and has partnered with other notable players such as John McEnroe and Anne White.

== Early life ==
Beginning when she was 10 years old, Margolin played in numerous USTA junior tournaments, achieving a rank of No. 6 in the Under-12 division in Southern California. She was ranked No. 17 in the nation after competing in the USTA Under-14 Junior Tennis Team National Competition. In 1975, she reached the No. 1 rank in Southern California Girls Under-16 and continue to win the U.S. Under-18 Indoor Championship in 1976 and become the No. 1 Southern California Girls Under-18 and No. 5 U.S. Girls Under-18. Margolin would win the Ojai Tennis Tournament, the country's oldest amateur tennis tournament, seven times — U14s, U16s, U18s, Doubles, Women's Open (twice), and Collegiate Division.

== High school and collegiate career ==
At Beverly Hills High School, Margolin was not only the No. 1 women's singles player, but joined the men's varsity tennis team and became their No. 1 player as well.

She would then go on to be No. 1 women's singles player at the University of Southern California, where she went undefeated during her freshman and sophomore years in their dual home matches. She helped lead the USC Trojans to a USTA (1978) and an AIAW (1979) national team title. Margolin would become a two-time Collegiate All-American during those two years. As a freshman, she would become the USTA Collegiate Singles Champion.

== Professional career ==
In 1977, Margolin was the U.S. 21-and-Under Champion and was a member of the U.S. Team participating in the Junior Wightman Cup. She won the Ojai Tennis Tournament in women's singles. Additionally, she was the runner-up to Tracy Austin at Avon Futures of Portland.

At the 1977 Maccabiah Games in Israel — a competition for Israeli and Jewish athletes — Margolin won gold, silver (in women's singles, losing to Dana Gilbert), and bronze medals at various tennis events. She and Peter Rennert won the gold medal in mixed doubles, defeating South Africa's Ilana Kloss and Graham Silverman.

In 1978, she was the U.S. 21-and-under Amateur Hard Court Champion as well as a U.S. Team Member in the Federation Cup held in the United Kingdom. Margolin went on to defeat Tracy Austin to become the Women's Southern California Sectional Champion and was the Southern California Sectional Mixed Doubles Champion with her brother, Mike Margolin. Margolin won her first and only tour championship, the 1978 WTA's Women in Tennis International Singles Champion held in San Antonio, Texas.

After turning professional in 1979, she reached a career-high No. 18 world ranking and finished the 1979 season ranked No. 25. Margolin was consistently ranked in the top 40 between 1980 and 1984, and would go on to be a Wimbledon Plate quarter finalist and a semi-finalist in the Wells Fargo Open in San Diego. She continued to compete on the tour and participate in 25 grand slam championships, including the 1978 Wimbledon and U.S. Open mixed doubles, in which she was partnered with John McEnroe. In 1988 she again won the Ojai Tennis Tournament in women's singles.

== Personal life ==
After retiring from professional match play, Margolin earned a sociology degree from UCLA and a master's degree in clinical psychology from Pepperdine University. She became the Head Tennis Director of the Youth and Adult Recreation Department in Ojai, California, from 1995 to 1998. She then became a nutrition and wellness consultant/lecturer at the Weil Tennis Academy in Ojai, and was the head tennis coach of the boys and girls teams at the Thacher School. Margolin self-published a book of poetry called Thoughts Allowed ... A Journey into a Woman's Mind, Heart & Soul in 2009. Currently, she works with her husband as a health coach in their hiking, biking, rock climbing, and tennis company, Trails by Potter.

== Awards ==
Margolin won the Tennis Teaching Pro Outstanding Service Award from 1986 to 1989. She was inducted into the Southern California Jewish Sports Hall of Fame in 2004 as well as the Beverly Hills High School Athletic Hall of Fame in 2009. She entered the ITA Women's Collegiate Tennis Hall of Fame in 2014.

== WTA Tour finals ==
=== Singles (1-0) ===
| Result | Date | Tournament | Tier | Surface | Opponent | Score |
|---|---|---|---|---|---|---|
| Win | Sep 1978 | San Antonio, United States | Series (A) | Hard | (South Africa) Yvonne Vermaak | 7–5, 6–1 |

== Grand Slam record ==
=== Singles ===
| Year | Australian Open | French Open | | Wimbledon | | US Open | |
|---|---|---|---|---|---|---|---|
| 1977 | - | - | | - | | 2nd Round | Florenta Mihai |
| 1978 | - | - | | 2nd Round | Betty Stöve | 4th Round | Virginia Ruzici |
| 1979 | - | - | | 2nd Round | Wendy White | 3rd Round | Billie Jean King |
| 1980 | - | 1st Round | Jeanne DuVall | 3rd Round | Dianne Fromholtz | 3rd Round | Renáta Tomanová |
| 1981 | - | 2nd Round | Eva Pfaff | 1st Round | Nina Bohm | 1st Round | Jeanne DuVall |
| 1982 | - | 3rd Round | Ivanna Madruga | 1st Round | Kathy Rinaldi | 1st Round | Heather Crowe |

The result is on the right. The final opponent is on the left.

=== Doubles ===
| Year | Australian Open | French Open | | Wimbledon | | US Open | |
|---|---|---|---|---|---|---|---|
| 1977 | - | - | | - | | 1st Round Peanut Louie | Linky Boshoff Ilana Kloss |
| 1978 | - | - | | - | | 1st Round Sherry Acker | Chris O'Neil Paula Smith |
| 1979 | - | - | | 2nd Round A. M. Fernández | Leslie Allen Rayni Fox | 2nd Round Greer Stevens | R. Maršíková R. Tomanová |
| 1980 | - | 2nd Round Kate Latham | H. Mandlíková R. Tomanová | 2nd Round Penny Johnson | Kim Jones Lindsay Morse | 2nd Round R. Fairbank | Diane Desfor B. Hallquist |
| 1981 | - | 3rd Round Anne White | C. Reynolds Paula Smith | 2nd Round Anne White | A. Buchanan Kim Sands | 1st Round Nancy Yeargin | A. Henricksson Trey Lewis |
| 1982 | - | 1st Round Trey Lewis | Pam Casale L. Thompson | 1st Round Peanut Louie | Laura duPont B. Jordan | 1st Round Peanut Louie | Susan Leo Pam Whytcross |
| 1983 | - | 1st Round G. Ohaco | Barbara Rossi K. Skronská | 2nd Round Kim Jones | Mima Jaušovec Kathy Jordan | - | |
| 1984 | - | 1st Round Helena Manset | Helena Suková Virginia Wade | 1st Round Helena Manset | K. Kinney R Mentz | 2nd Round Beth Norton | A. Moulton Paula Smith |

The result is on the right. The partner is below the result. The final opponent is on the left.

=== Mixed doubles ===
| Year | Australian Open | French Open | | Wimbledon | | US Open | |
|---|---|---|---|---|---|---|---|
| 1977 | - | - | | - | | 1st Round Trey Waltke | Kerry Reid Grover Reid |
| 1978 | - | - | | 2nd Round John McEnroe | Ilana Kloss Chris Kachel | 3rd Round John McEnroe | Anne Smith Stan Smith |
| 1979 | - | - | | - | | 1st Round Mike Margolin | Betty Stöve Frew McMillan |
| 1980 | - | 1st Round F. Buehning | Leslie Allen C. Lewis | - | | 1st Round Mike Margolin | B. Jordan Tracy Delatte |
| 1981 | - | - | | - | | 1st Round Mike Margolin | Bettina Bunge Dick Stockton |
| 1982 | - | - | | 2nd Round Chris Dunk | Anne White Chip Hooper | - | |
| 1984 | - | 1st Round Sean Brawley | M. Maleeva Mike Leach | - | | - | |

The result is on the right. The partner is below the result. The final opponent is on the left.

== Charity work ==
Margolin organized the first Ojai Tennis Marathon in 2000, an event in which participants attempt to play fifty games of tennis in a single day to raise funding for the Ojai Valley Youth Foundation, of which Margolin's husband, Ian Potter, is on the board of directors. Margolin continues to organize the tennis marathon event as of 2015.

== See also ==
- List of select Jewish tennis players
