= Lisa Doherty =

American tennis player

- Country (sports): United States
- Born: March 5, 1959 (age 66)

Singles

Grand Slam singles results
- US Open: 2R (1981)

Doubles

Grand Slam doubles results
- US Open: 2R (1980)

Lisa Doherty (born March 5, 1959) is an American former professional tennis player.

Raised in Worcester, Massachusetts, Doherty didn't take up tennis until the age of 12 and began competing on tour in the late 1970s. She qualified for her first US Open main draw in 1980 and made the second round in 1981.

Doherty married her former coach John Preeg and now lives in Naples, Florida.
