= 1980 US Open (tennis) =

- Date: August 26 – September 7
- Edition: 100th
- Category: Grand Slam (ITF)
- Surface: Hardcourt
- Location: Flushing Meadows, New York City, United States
- Venue: National Tennis Center

Champions

Men's singles
- (United States) John McEnroe

Women's singles
- (United States) Chris Evert-Lloyd

Men's doubles
- (United States) Bob Lutz / (United States) Stan Smith

Women's doubles
- (United States) Billie Jean King / (United States) Martina Navratilova

Mixed doubles
- (Australia) Wendy Turnbull / (United States) Marty Riessen

Boys' singles
- (United States) Mike Falberg

Girls' singles
- (United States) Susan Mascarin
- US Open

The 1980 US Open was a tennis tournament played on outdoor hard courts at the USTA National Tennis Center in New York City in New York in the United States. It was the 100th edition of the US Open and was held from August 26 to September 7, 1980.

== Seniors ==
=== Men's singles ===
(United States) John McEnroe defeated (Sweden) Björn Borg 7–6 ^{(7–4)}, 6–1, 6–7^{(5–7)}, 5–7, 6–4

- It was McEnroe's 2nd career Grand Slam singles title and his 2nd consecutive US Open title.

=== Women's singles ===
(United States) Chris Evert-Lloyd defeated (Czechoslovakia) Hana Mandlíková 5–7, 6–1, 6–1

- It was Evert-Lloyd's 14th career Grand Slam title and her 5th US Open title.

=== Men's doubles ===
(United States) Bob Lutz / (United States) Stan Smith defeated (United States) John McEnroe / (United States) Peter Fleming 7–6, 3–6, 6–1, 3–6, 6–3

- It was Lutz's 5th and last career Grand Slam title and his 4th US Open title. It was Smith's 7th and last career Grand Slam title and his 5th US Open title.

=== Women's doubles ===
(United States) Billie Jean King / (United States) Martina Navratilova defeated (United States) Pam Shriver / (Netherlands) Betty Stöve 7–6 ^{(7–2)}, 7–5

- It was King's 39th and last career Grand Slam title and her 13th US Open title. It was Navratilova's 9th career Grand Slam title and her 3rd US Open title.

=== Mixed doubles ===
(Australia) Wendy Turnbull / (United States) Marty Riessen defeated (Netherlands) Betty Stöve / (South Africa) Frew McMillan 7–5, 6–2

- It was Turnbull's 5th career Grand Slam title and her 2nd US Open title. It was Riessen's 9th and last career Grand Slam title and his 5th US Open title.

== Juniors ==
=== Boys' singles ===
(United States) Mike Falberg defeated (Netherlands) Eric Wilborts 6–7, 6–3, 6–3

=== Girls' singles ===
(United States) Susan Mascarin defeated (United States) Kathrin Keil 6–3, 6–4

=== Boys' doubles ===
The tournament began in 1982.

=== Girls' doubles ===
The tournament began in 1982.

Preceded by 1980 Wimbledon Championships	Grand Slams	Succeeded by 1980 Australian Open
