= 1978 WTA Tour =

Women's tennis circuit

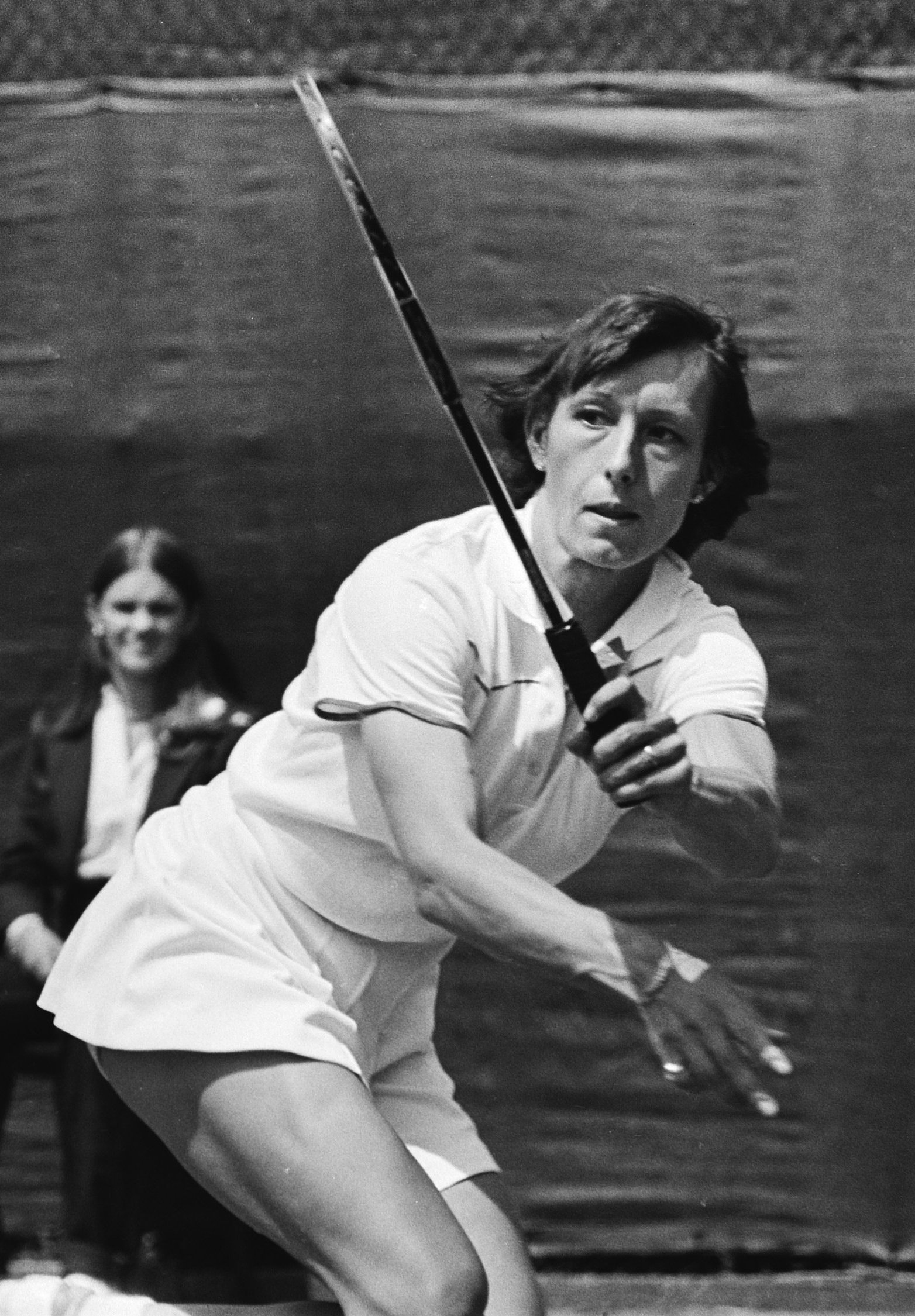
- Martina Navratilova finished the year as world No. 1 for the first time in her career. She won eleven singles tournaments during the season, including a major at the Wimbledon Championships, as well as the Virginia Slims Championships.

Details
- Duration: 14 November 1977 – 18 December 1978
- Edition: 6th
- Tournaments: 47
- Categories: Grand Slam (4); WTA Championships (3); Virginia Slims Circuit (11); Colgate International Series (23); Non-tour events (4)

Achievements (singles)
- Most titles: (United States) Martina Navratilova (11)
- Most finals: (United States) Martina Navratilova (15)
- Prize money leader: (United States) Chris Evert ($454,486)
- Points leader: (United States) Martina Navratilova (15.660)

Awards
- Player of the year: (United States) Martina Navratilova
- Doubles team of the year: (United States) Billie Jean King (United States) Martina Navratilova
- Most improved player of the year: (Romania) Virginia Ruzici
- Newcomer of the year: (United States) Pam Shriver

The 1978 WTA Tour consisted of a number of tennis tournaments for female tennis players. It was composed of two subsidiary circuits, the streamlined winter version of the Virginia Slims Circuit (which was now an 11-week tour of the United States) and the world wide Colgate International Series. The tour was administered by the Women's International Professional Tennis Council.

== Schedule ==
This is a calendar of all events which were part of either the Virginia Slims circuit or the Colgate Series in the year 1978, with player progression documented from the quarterfinals stage. Also included are the Grand Slam tournaments, the 1978 Virginia Slims Championships, the 1978 Federation Cup and a number of events not affiliated with either tour.

Key

Grand Slam tournaments
Virginia Slims/Colgate Series championships
Virginia Slims Circuit
Colgate International Series
Non-tour events
Team events

=== November (1977) ===
Week	Tournament	Champions	Runners-up	Semifinalists	Quarterfinalists
14 Nov	Colgate International of Australia; Sydney, Australia; Colgate Series (AAAA); Grass – $100,000	(Australia) Evonne Goolagong Cawley; 6–1, 6–3	(Australia) Kerry Reid	(Australia) Dianne Fromholtz (South Africa) Greer Stevens	(United States) Terry Holladay (United States) Pam Teeguarden (United States) Jeanne Evert (Netherlands) Betty Stöve
14 Nov	Colgate International of Australia; Sydney, Australia; Colgate Series (AAAA); Grass – $100,000	(Australia) Kerry Reid / (South Africa) Greer Stevens vs. (Australia) Evonne Goolagong Cawley / (Netherlands) Betty Stöve; Cancelled		(Australia) Dianne Fromholtz (South Africa) Greer Stevens	(United States) Terry Holladay (United States) Pam Teeguarden (United States) Jeanne Evert (Netherlands) Betty Stöve
21 Nov	Toyota Classic; Melbourne, Australia; Colgate Series (AA); Grass – $75,000	(Australia) Evonne Goolagong Cawley; 6–4, 6–1	(Australia) Wendy Turnbull	(United Kingdom) Sue Barker (Netherlands) Betty Stöve	(Australia) Pam Whytcross (Australia) Kerry Reid (Australia) Dianne Fromholtz (Australia) Helen Gourlay Cawley
21 Nov	Toyota Classic; Melbourne, Australia; Colgate Series (AA); Grass – $75,000	(Australia) Evonne Goolagong Cawley (Netherlands) Betty Stöve; 6–3, 6–0	(United States) Patricia Bostrom (Australia) Kym Ruddell	(United Kingdom) Sue Barker (Netherlands) Betty Stöve	(Australia) Pam Whytcross (Australia) Kerry Reid (Australia) Dianne Fromholtz (Australia) Helen Gourlay Cawley
28 Novr	South African Open; Johannesburg, South Africa; Colgate Series (A); Hard – $35,000	(South Africa) Linky Boshoff; 6–4, 6–1	(South Africa) Brigitte Cuypers	(South Africa) Yvonne Vermaak (United States) Sharon Walsh	(South Africa) Niekle Scheepers (United States) Jeanne Evert (South Africa) Marise Kruger (South Africa) Alison McDade
28 Novr	South African Open; Johannesburg, South Africa; Colgate Series (A); Hard – $35,000	(South Africa) Linky Boshoff (South Africa) Ilana Kloss; 5–7, 6–3, 6–3	(South Africa) Brigitte Cuypers (South Africa) Marise Kruger	(South Africa) Yvonne Vermaak (United States) Sharon Walsh	(South Africa) Niekle Scheepers (United States) Jeanne Evert (South Africa) Marise Kruger (South Africa) Alison McDade

=== December (1977) ===
Week	Tournament	Champions	Runners-up	Semifinalists	Quarterfinalists
5 Dec	Bremar Cup; London, Great Britain; Colgate Series (A); Hard – $35,000	(United States) Billie Jean King; 6–3, 6–1	(United Kingdom) Virginia Wade	(Netherlands) Betty Stöve (Romania) Virginia Ruzici	(South Africa) Tanya Harford (United States) Sharon Walsh (Romania) Florența Mihai (Czechoslovakia) Renáta Tomanová
5 Dec	Bremar Cup; London, Great Britain; Colgate Series (A); Hard – $35,000	(United States) Billie Jean King (Czechoslovakia) Renáta Tomanová; 6–2, 6–3	(Netherlands) Betty Stöve (United Kingdom) Virginia Wade	(Netherlands) Betty Stöve (Romania) Virginia Ruzici	(South Africa) Tanya Harford (United States) Sharon Walsh (Romania) Florența Mihai (Czechoslovakia) Renáta Tomanová
12 Dec	Marlboro NSW Open; Sydney, Australia; Colgate Series (A); Grass – $35,000	(Australia) Evonne Goolagong Cawley; 6–2, 6–3	(United Kingdom) Sue Barker	(Australia) Kerry Reid (Czechoslovakia) Regina Maršíková	
12 Dec	Marlboro NSW Open; Sydney, Australia; Colgate Series (A); Grass – $35,000	(Australia) Evonne Goolagong Cawley (Australia) Helen Gourlay Cawley; 6–0, 6–0	(United States) Mona Guerrant (Australia) Kerry Reid	(Australia) Kerry Reid (Czechoslovakia) Regina Maršíková	
19 Dec; 26 Dec	Australian Open; Melbourne, Australia; Grand Slam (A); Grass – 32S/16D; Singles – Doubles	(Australia) Evonne Goolagong Cawley; 6–3, 6–0	(Australia) Helen Gourlay Cawley	(Australia) Kerry Reid (United Kingdom) Sue Barker	(Australia) Judy Dalton (Australia) Kathleen Harter (United States) Mona Guerrant (United States) Rayni Fox
19 Dec; 26 Dec	Australian Open; Melbourne, Australia; Grand Slam (A); Grass – 32S/16D; Singles – Doubles	(Australia) Evonne Goolagong Cawley / (Australia) Helen Gourlay Cawley vs. (United States) Mona Guerrant / (Australia) Kerry Reid; Cancelled due to Rain		(Australia) Kerry Reid (United Kingdom) Sue Barker	(Australia) Judy Dalton (Australia) Kathleen Harter (United States) Mona Guerrant (United States) Rayni Fox

=== January ===
Week	Tournament	Champions	Runners-up	Semifinalists	Quarterfinalists
2 Jan	Virginia Slims of Washington; Washington, United States; Virginia Slims; Carpet (i) – $100,000 – 32S/16D	(United States) Martina Navratilova; 7–5, 6–4	(Netherlands) Betty Stöve	(Australia) Dianne Fromholtz (United States) JoAnne Russell	(South Africa) Greer Stevens (United States) Kathy May (Romania) Virginia Ruzici (United States) Nancy Richey
2 Jan	Virginia Slims of Washington; Washington, United States; Virginia Slims; Carpet (i) – $100,000 – 32S/16D	(United States) Billie Jean King (United States) Martina Navratilova; 6–3, 7–5	(Netherlands) Betty Stöve (Australia) Wendy Turnbull	(Australia) Dianne Fromholtz (United States) JoAnne Russell	(South Africa) Greer Stevens (United States) Kathy May (Romania) Virginia Ruzici (United States) Nancy Richey
9 Jan	Virginia Slims of Hollywood; Hollywood, United States; Virginia Slims; Carpet (i) – $100,000 – 32S/16D	(Australia) Evonne Goolagong Cawley; 6–2, 6–3	(Australia) Wendy Turnbull	(Netherlands) Betty Stöve (United Kingdom) Virginia Wade	(United States) Tracy Austin (United States) Marita Redondo (United States) Nancy Richey (United States) Kathy Teacher
9 Jan	Virginia Slims of Hollywood; Hollywood, United States; Virginia Slims; Carpet (i) – $100,000 – 32S/16D	(United States) Rosie Casals (Australia) Wendy Turnbull; 6–2, 6–4	(France) Françoise Dürr (United Kingdom) Virginia Wade	(Netherlands) Betty Stöve (United Kingdom) Virginia Wade	(United States) Tracy Austin (United States) Marita Redondo (United States) Nancy Richey (United States) Kathy Teacher
16 Jan	Virginia Slims of Houston; Houston, United States; Virginia Slims; Carpet (i) – $100,000 – 32S/16D	(United States) Martina Navratilova; 1–6, 6–2, 6–2	(United States) Billie Jean King	(Netherlands) Betty Stöve (United Kingdom) Virginia Wade	(South Africa) Yvonne Vermaak (United Kingdom) Sue Barker (United States) Rosie Casals (Australia) Wendy Turnbull
16 Jan	Virginia Slims of Houston; Houston, United States; Virginia Slims; Carpet (i) – $100,000 – 32S/16D	(United States) Billie Jean King (United States) Martina Navratilova; 7–6^{(5–4)}, 4–6, 7–6^{(5–4)}	(South Africa) Greer Stevens (United States) Mona Guerrant	(Netherlands) Betty Stöve (United Kingdom) Virginia Wade	(South Africa) Yvonne Vermaak (United Kingdom) Sue Barker (United States) Rosie Casals (Australia) Wendy Turnbull
23 Jan	Virginia Slims of Los Angeles; Los Angeles, United States; Virginia Slims; Carpet (i) – $100,000 – 32S/16D	(United States) Martina Navratilova; 6–3, 6–2	(United States) Rosie Casals	(South Africa) Marise Kruger (South Africa) Greer Stevens	(South Africa) Yvonne Vermaak (United Kingdom) Sue Barker (United Kingdom) Virginia Wade (United States) Tracy Austin
23 Jan	Virginia Slims of Los Angeles; Los Angeles, United States; Virginia Slims; Carpet (i) – $100,000 – 32S/16D	(Netherlands) Betty Stöve (United Kingdom) Virginia Wade; 6–3, 6–2	(United States) Pam Teeguarden (South Africa) Greer Stevens	(South Africa) Marise Kruger (South Africa) Greer Stevens	(South Africa) Yvonne Vermaak (United Kingdom) Sue Barker (United Kingdom) Virginia Wade (United States) Tracy Austin
30 Jan	Virginia Slims of Chicago; Chicago, United States; Virginia Slims; Carpet (i) – $100,000 – 32S/16D	(United States) Martina Navratilova; 6–7^{(4–5)}, 6–2, 6–2	(Australia) Evonne Goolagong Cawley	(Netherlands) Betty Stöve (United Kingdom) Virginia Wade	(Australia) Kerry Reid (United Kingdom) Sue Barker (Australia) Wendy Turnbull (United States) Rosie Casals
30 Jan	Virginia Slims of Chicago; Chicago, United States; Virginia Slims; Carpet (i) – $100,000 – 32S/16D	(Netherlands) Betty Stöve (Australia) Evonne Goolagong Cawley; 6–1, 6–4	(United States) Rosie Casals (United States) JoAnne Russell	(Netherlands) Betty Stöve (United Kingdom) Virginia Wade	(Australia) Kerry Reid (United Kingdom) Sue Barker (Australia) Wendy Turnbull (United States) Rosie Casals

=== February ===
Week	Tournament	Champions	Runners-up	Semifinalists	Quarterfinalists
6 Feb	Virginia Slims of Seattle; Seattle, United States; Virginia Slims; Carpet (i) – $100,000 – 32S/15D	(United States) Martina Navratilova; 6–1, 1–6, 6–1	(Netherlands) Betty Stöve	(Australia) Wendy Turnbull (United States) Marita Redondo	(United States) Kathy May (United States) Rosie Casals (Australia) Kerry Reid (United States) JoAnne Russell
6 Feb	Virginia Slims of Seattle; Seattle, United States; Virginia Slims; Carpet (i) – $100,000 – 32S/15D	(Australia) Kerry Reid (Australia) Wendy Turnbull; 6–2, 6–3	(United States) Patricia Bostrom (United States) Marita Redondo	(Australia) Wendy Turnbull (United States) Marita Redondo	(United States) Kathy May (United States) Rosie Casals (Australia) Kerry Reid (United States) JoAnne Russell
20 Feb	Virginia Slims of Detroit; Detroit, United States; Virginia Slims; Carpet (i) – $100,000 – 32S/16D	(United States) Martina Navratilova; 6–3, 6–2	(Australia) Dianne Fromholtz	(United Kingdom) Virginia Wade (United States) Billie Jean King	(Australia) Kerry Reid (South Africa) Greer Stevens (United States) Sharon Walsh (Australia) Evonne Goolagong Cawley
20 Feb	Virginia Slims of Detroit; Detroit, United States; Virginia Slims; Carpet (i) – $100,000 – 32S/16D	(United States) Billie Jean King (United States) Martina Navratilova; 6–3, 6–4	(Australia) Kerry Melville (Australia) Wendy Turnbull	(United Kingdom) Virginia Wade (United States) Billie Jean King	(Australia) Kerry Reid (South Africa) Greer Stevens (United States) Sharon Walsh (Australia) Evonne Goolagong Cawley
27 Feb	Virginia Slims of Kansas; Kansas, United States; Virginia Slims; Carpet (i) – $100,000 – 34S/16D	(United States) Martina Navratilova; 7–5, 2–6, 6–3	(United States) Billie Jean King	(United Kingdom) Virginia Wade (Australia) Wendy Turnbull	(Australia) Kerry Reid (South Africa) Brigitte Cuypers (United States) Rosie Casals (Australia) Evonne Goolagong Cawley
27 Feb	Virginia Slims of Kansas; Kansas, United States; Virginia Slims; Carpet (i) – $100,000 – 34S/16D	(United States) Billie Jean King (United States) Martina Navratilova; 6–4, 6–4	(Australia) Kerry Reid (Australia) Wendy Turnbull	(United Kingdom) Virginia Wade (Australia) Wendy Turnbull	(Australia) Kerry Reid (South Africa) Brigitte Cuypers (United States) Rosie Casals (Australia) Evonne Goolagong Cawley

=== March ===
Week	Tournament	Champions	Runners-up	Semifinalists	Quarterfinalists
6 Mar	Virginia Slims of Dallas; Dallas, United States; Virginia Slims; Carpet (i) – $100,000 – 32S/14D	(Australia) Evonne Goolagong Cawley; 4–6, 6–0, 6–2	(United States) Tracy Austin	(United States) Pam Shriver (3rd) (United States) Anne Smith (4th)	(United States) Martina Navratilova (South Africa) Marise Kruger (Australia) Kerry Reid (United States) Rosie Casals
6 Mar	Virginia Slims of Dallas; Dallas, United States; Virginia Slims; Carpet (i) – $100,000 – 32S/14D	(United States) Martina Navratilova (United States) Anne Smith; 6–3, 7–6^{(5–2)}	(Australia) Evonne Goolagong Cawley (Netherlands) Betty Stöve	(United States) Pam Shriver (3rd) (United States) Anne Smith (4th)	(United States) Martina Navratilova (South Africa) Marise Kruger (Australia) Kerry Reid (United States) Rosie Casals
13 Mar	Virginia Slims of Boston; Boston, United States; Virginia Slims; Carpet (i) – $100,000 – 33S/14D	(Australia) Evonne Goolagong Cawley; 4–6, 6–1, 6–4	(United States) Chris Evert	(United States) Martina Navratilova (United States) Billie Jean King	(Australia) Kerry Reid (South Africa) Marise Kruger (United States) Marita Redondo (United States) Rosie Casals
13 Mar	Virginia Slims of Boston; Boston, United States; Virginia Slims; Carpet (i) – $100,000 – 33S/14D	(United States) Billie Jean King (United States) Martina Navratilova; 6–3, 6–2	(Australia) Evonne Goolagong Cawley (Netherlands) Betty Stöve	(United States) Martina Navratilova (United States) Billie Jean King	(Australia) Kerry Reid (South Africa) Marise Kruger (United States) Marita Redondo (United States) Rosie Casals
20 Mar	Virginia Slims of Philadelphia; Philadelphia, United States; Virginia Slims; Carpet (i) – $100,000 – 32S/1D; Singles – Double	(United States) Chris Evert; 6–0, 6–4	(United States) Billie Jean King	(United Kingdom) Virginia Wade (Romania) Virginia Ruzici	(Australia) Wendy Turnbull (United States) Tracy Austin (Netherlands) Betty Stöve (Australia) Kerry Melville
20 Mar	Virginia Slims of Philadelphia; Philadelphia, United States; Virginia Slims; Carpet (i) – $100,000 – 32S/1D; Singles – Double	(Australia) Kerry Reid (Australia) Wendy Turnbull; 6–3, 7–5	(France) Françoise Dürr (United Kingdom) Virginia Wade	(United Kingdom) Virginia Wade (Romania) Virginia Ruzici	(Australia) Wendy Turnbull (United States) Tracy Austin (Netherlands) Betty Stöve (Australia) Kerry Melville
27 Mar	Virginia Slims Championships; Los Angeles, United States; Season-end championships Carpet (i) – $150,000 – 16S (8RR); Single	(United States) Martina Navratilova; 7–6^{(5–0)}, 6–4	(Australia) Evonne Goolagong Cawley	(Australia) Wendy Turnbull (United States) Rosie Casals 4th	Round robin (United Kingdom) Virginia Wade (United States) Billie Jean King (Netherlands) Betty Stöve (Australia) Kerry Reid

=== April ===
Week	Tournament	Champions	Runners-up	Semifinalists	Quarterfinalists
3 Apr	Bridgestone Doubles Championships; Salt Lake City, United States $100,000 – Carpet (i) – 8D	(United States) Martina Navratilova (United States) Billie Jean King; 6–4, 6–4	(France) Françoise Dürr (United Kingdom) Virginia Wade	(Netherlands) Stöve / (Australia) Goolagong Cawley (Australia) Reid / (Australia) Turnbull	(South Africa) Stevens / (United States) Schallau (United States) Bostrom / (United States) Redondo (United States) Casals / (United States) Russell (United States) Kemmer / (United States) Newberry
10 Apr	Family Circle Cup; Hilton Head Island, United States; Colgate Series (AAA); Clay – $125,000 – 30S/16D	(United States) Chris Evert; 6–2, 6–0	(Australia) Kerry Reid	(United States) JoAnne Russell (United States) Tracy Austin	(United States) Martina Navratilova (United States) Jeanne DuVall (United States) Rosie Casals (United States) Renée Richards
10 Apr	Family Circle Cup; Hilton Head Island, United States; Colgate Series (AAA); Clay – $125,000 – 30S/16D	(United States) Billie Jean King (United States) Martina Navratilova; 6–3, 7–5	(United States) Mona Guerrant (South Africa) Greer Stevens	(United States) JoAnne Russell (United States) Tracy Austin	(United States) Martina Navratilova (United States) Jeanne DuVall (United States) Rosie Casals (United States) Renée Richards

=== May ===
Week	Tournament	Champions	Runners-up	Semifinalists	Quarterfinalists
15 May	German Open; Hamburg, West Germany; Colgate Series (A); Clay – $35,000 – 64S/16D	(Socialist Federal Republic of Yugoslavia) Mima Jaušovec; 6–2, 6–3	(Romania) Virginia Ruzici	(Czechoslovakia) Regina Maršíková (West Germany) Sylvia Hanika	(Czechoslovakia) Renáta Tomanová (Argentina) Viviana González (United States) Kathy May (United States) Laura duPont
15 May	German Open; Hamburg, West Germany; Colgate Series (A); Clay – $35,000 – 64S/16D	(Socialist Federal Republic of Yugoslavia) Mima Jaušovec (Romania) Virginia Ruzici; 6–4, 5–7, 6–0	(West Germany) Katja Ebbinghaus (West Germany) Helga Niessen Masthoff	(Czechoslovakia) Regina Maršíková (West Germany) Sylvia Hanika	(Czechoslovakia) Renáta Tomanová (Argentina) Viviana González (United States) Kathy May (United States) Laura duPont
22 May	Italian Open; Rome, Italy; Colgate Series (A); Clay – $35,000	(Czechoslovakia) Regina Maršíková; 7–5, 7–5	(Romania) Virginia Ruzici	(United States) Janet Newberry (United Kingdom) Michelle Tyler	(Socialist Federal Republic of Yugoslavia) Mima Jaušovec (United States) Betsy Nagelsen (West Germany) Katja Ebbinghaus (Czechoslovakia) Renáta Tomanová
22 May	Italian Open; Rome, Italy; Colgate Series (A); Clay – $35,000	(Socialist Federal Republic of Yugoslavia) Mima Jaušovec (Romania) Virginia Ruzici; 6–2, 2–6, 7–6	(Romania) Florența Mihai (United States) Betsy Nagelsen	(United States) Janet Newberry (United Kingdom) Michelle Tyler	(Socialist Federal Republic of Yugoslavia) Mima Jaušovec (United States) Betsy Nagelsen (West Germany) Katja Ebbinghaus (Czechoslovakia) Renáta Tomanová
29 May; 5 June	French Open; Paris, France; Grand Slam (AA) $337,000 – Clay – 64S/32D/24X; Singles – Doubles – Mixed doubles	(Romania) Virginia Ruzici; 6–2, 6–2	(Socialist Federal Republic of Yugoslavia) Mima Jaušovec	(Czechoslovakia) Regina Maršíková (France) Brigitte Simon	(United States) Kathy May (West Germany) Helga Niessen Masthoff (Czechoslovakia) Mirka Bendlová (Uruguay) Fiorella Bonicelli
29 May; 5 June	French Open; Paris, France; Grand Slam (AA) $337,000 – Clay – 64S/32D/24X; Singles – Doubles – Mixed doubles	(Socialist Federal Republic of Yugoslavia) Mima Jaušovec (Romania) Virginia Ruzici; 5–7, 6–4, 8–6	(Australia) Lesley Turner Bowrey (France) Gail Sherriff Chanfreau	(Czechoslovakia) Regina Maršíková (France) Brigitte Simon	(United States) Kathy May (West Germany) Helga Niessen Masthoff (Czechoslovakia) Mirka Bendlová (Uruguay) Fiorella Bonicelli
29 May; 5 June	French Open; Paris, France; Grand Slam (AA) $337,000 – Clay – 64S/32D/24X; Singles – Doubles – Mixed doubles	(Czechoslovakia) Renáta Tomanová (Czechoslovakia) Pavel Složil; 7–6 ret	(Romania) Virginia Ruzici (France) Patrice Dominguez	(Czechoslovakia) Regina Maršíková (France) Brigitte Simon	(United States) Kathy May (West Germany) Helga Niessen Masthoff (Czechoslovakia) Mirka Bendlová (Uruguay) Fiorella Bonicelli

=== June ===
Week	Tournament	Champions	Runners-up	Semifinalists	Quarterfinalists
12 Jun	Keith Prowse International; Chichester, Great Britain; Colgate Series (A); Grass – $35,000 – 32S/16D	(Australia) Evonne Goolagong Cawley; 6–4, 6–4	(United States) Pam Teeguarden	(United States) Janet Wright (United States) Sharon Walsh	(United States) Barbara Potter (United States) Diane Desfor (Australia) Cynthia Doerner (United States) Tracy Austin
12 Jun	Keith Prowse International; Chichester, Great Britain; Colgate Series (A); Grass – $35,000 – 32S/16D	(United States) Janet Wright (United States) Pam Shriver; 3–6, 6–3, 6–4	(United Kingdom) Michelle Tyler (South Africa) Yvonne Vermaak	(United States) Janet Wright (United States) Sharon Walsh	(United States) Barbara Potter (United States) Diane Desfor (Australia) Cynthia Doerner (United States) Tracy Austin
19 Jun	Colgate International; Eastbourne, Great Britain; Colgate Series (AA); Grass – $75,000 – 64S/32D	(United States) Martina Navratilova; 6–4, 4–6, 9–7	(United States) Chris Evert	(Australia) Wendy Turnbull (United States) Billie Jean King	(United Kingdom) Anne Hobbs (United Kingdom) Virginia Wade (Netherlands) Betty Stöve (United Kingdom) Michelle Tyler
19 Jun	Colgate International; Eastbourne, Great Britain; Colgate Series (AA); Grass – $75,000 – 64S/32D	(United States) Chris Evert (Netherlands) Betty Stöve; 6–4, 6–7, 7–5	(United States) Billie Jean King (United States) Martina Navratilova	(Australia) Wendy Turnbull (United States) Billie Jean King	(United Kingdom) Anne Hobbs (United Kingdom) Virginia Wade (Netherlands) Betty Stöve (United Kingdom) Michelle Tyler
26 Jun; 3 Jul	Wimbledon Championships; London, Great Britain; Grand Slam (AAAA); Grass – 96S/48D/64X; Singles – Doubles – Mixed doubles	(United States) Martina Navratilova; 2–6, 6–4, 7–5	(United States) Chris Evert	(United Kingdom) Virginia Wade (Australia) Evonne Goolagong Cawley	(United States) Billie Jean King (Socialist Federal Republic of Yugoslavia) Mima Jaušovec (Romania) Virginia Ruzici (South Africa) Marise Kruger
26 Jun; 3 Jul	Wimbledon Championships; London, Great Britain; Grand Slam (AAAA); Grass – 96S/48D/64X; Singles – Doubles – Mixed doubles	(Australia) Kerry Reid (Australia) Wendy Turnbull; 4–6, 9–8^{(12–10)}, 6–3	(Socialist Federal Republic of Yugoslavia) Mima Jaušovec (Romania) Virginia Ruzici	(United Kingdom) Virginia Wade (Australia) Evonne Goolagong Cawley	(United States) Billie Jean King (Socialist Federal Republic of Yugoslavia) Mima Jaušovec (Romania) Virginia Ruzici (South Africa) Marise Kruger
26 Jun; 3 Jul	Wimbledon Championships; London, Great Britain; Grand Slam (AAAA); Grass – 96S/48D/64X; Singles – Doubles – Mixed doubles	(Netherlands) Betty Stöve (South Africa) Frew McMillan; 6–2, 6-2	(United States) Billie Jean King (Australia) Ray Ruffels	(United Kingdom) Virginia Wade (Australia) Evonne Goolagong Cawley	(United States) Billie Jean King (Socialist Federal Republic of Yugoslavia) Mima Jaušovec (Romania) Virginia Ruzici (South Africa) Marise Kruger

=== August ===
Week	Tournament	Champions	Runners-up	Semifinalists	Quarterfinalists
7 Aug	US Clay Court Championships; Indianapolis, United States; Colgate Series (A); Clay – $35,000 – 48S/24D; Singles – Doubles	(United States) Dana Gilbert; 6–2, 6–3	(Argentina) Viviana González	(United States) Janet Wright (United States) Jeanne Evert	(United States) Kate Latham (United States) Caroline Stoll (United States) Valerie Ziegenfuss (United States) Jeanne DuVall
7 Aug	US Clay Court Championships; Indianapolis, United States; Colgate Series (A); Clay – $35,000 – 48S/24D; Singles – Doubles	(Sweden) Helena Anliot (Denmark) Helle Sparre-Viragh; 6–1, 6–3	(United States) Barbara Hallquist (United States) Sheila McInerney	(United States) Janet Wright (United States) Jeanne Evert	(United States) Kate Latham (United States) Caroline Stoll (United States) Valerie Ziegenfuss (United States) Jeanne DuVall
14 Aug	Rothmans Canadian Open; Toronto, Canada; Colgate Series (A); Hard – $35,000	(Czechoslovakia) Regina Maršíková; 7–5, 6–7^{(9–11)}, 6–2	(Romania) Virginia Ruzici	(United States) Diane Desfor (United States) Zenda Liess	(Socialist Federal Republic of Yugoslavia) Mima Jaušovec (South Africa) Yvonne Vermaak (Argentina) Viviana González (Australia) Lesley Hunt
14 Aug	Rothmans Canadian Open; Toronto, Canada; Colgate Series (A); Hard – $35,000	(Czechoslovakia) Regina Maršíková (United States) Pam Teeguarden; 5–7, 6–4, 6–2	(Australia) Chris O'Neil (United States) Paula Smith	(United States) Diane Desfor (United States) Zenda Liess	(Socialist Federal Republic of Yugoslavia) Mima Jaušovec (South Africa) Yvonne Vermaak (Argentina) Viviana González (Australia) Lesley Hunt
21 Aug	Bergen County Classic; Mahwah, United States; Colgate Series (AA); Hard – $75,000	(United Kingdom) Virginia Wade; 1–6, 6–1, 6–4	(Australia) Kerry Reid	(Czechoslovakia) Regina Maršíková (United States) Tracy Austin	(United States) Mareen Louie Harper (Australia) Lesley Hunt (United States) Betsy Nagelsen (United States) Caroline Stoll
21 Aug	Bergen County Classic; Mahwah, United States; Colgate Series (AA); Hard – $75,000	(South Africa) Ilana Kloss (South Africa) Marise Kruger; 6–3, 6–1	(United States) Barbara Potter (Australia) Pam Whytcross	(Czechoslovakia) Regina Maršíková (United States) Tracy Austin	(United States) Mareen Louie Harper (Australia) Lesley Hunt (United States) Betsy Nagelsen (United States) Caroline Stoll
28 Aug; 4 Sep	US Open; New York City, United States; Grand Slam (AAAA) $260,000 – Hard – 96S/32D/32X; Singles – Doubles – Mixed doubles	(United States) Chris Evert; 7–5, 6–4	(United States) Pam Shriver	(United States) Martina Navratilova (Australia) Wendy Turnbull	(Romania) Virginia Ruzici (Australia) Lesley Hunt (United States) Kathy May (United States) Tracy Austin
28 Aug; 4 Sep	US Open; New York City, United States; Grand Slam (AAAA) $260,000 – Hard – 96S/32D/32X; Singles – Doubles – Mixed doubles	(United States) Billie Jean King (United States) Martina Navratilova; 7–6, 6–4	(Australia) Kerry Reid (Australia) Wendy Turnbull	(United States) Martina Navratilova (Australia) Wendy Turnbull	(Romania) Virginia Ruzici (Australia) Lesley Hunt (United States) Kathy May (United States) Tracy Austin
28 Aug; 4 Sep	US Open; New York City, United States; Grand Slam (AAAA) $260,000 – Hard – 96S/32D/32X; Singles – Doubles – Mixed doubles	(Netherlands) Betty Stöve (South Africa) Frew McMillan; 6–2, 3–6, 6–3	(United States) Billie Jean King (Australia) Ray Ruffels	(United States) Martina Navratilova (Australia) Wendy Turnbull	(Romania) Virginia Ruzici (Australia) Lesley Hunt (United States) Kathy May (United States) Tracy Austin

=== September ===
Week	Tournament	Champions	Runners-up	Semifinalists	Quarterfinalists
11 Sep	Toray Sillook Open; Tokyo, Japan; Colgate Series (AAA); Carpet (i) – $75,000 – 32S	(United Kingdom) Virginia Wade; 6–4, 7–6^{(7–2)}	(Netherlands) Betty Stöve	(United States) Marita Redondo (Australia) Wendy Turnbull	(United States) Jeanne DuVall (United Kingdom) Michelle Tyler (Romania) Virginia Ruzici (United States) Carrie Meyer
11 Sep	Women in Tennis International; San Antonio, United States; Colgate Series (A); Hard – $35,000 – 32S/16D	(United States) Stacy Margolin; 7–5, 6–1	(South Africa) Yvonne Vermaak	(United States) Laura duPont (United States) Anna-Maria Fernandez	(South Africa) Ilana Kloss (United States) Barbara Hallquist (Brazil) Patricia Medrado (Australia) Cynthia Doerner
11 Sep	Women in Tennis International; San Antonio, United States; Colgate Series (A); Hard – $35,000 – 32S/16D	(South Africa) Ilana Kloss (South Africa) Marise Kruger; 6–1, 6–4	(United States) Laura duPont (France) Françoise Dürr	(United States) Laura duPont (United States) Anna-Maria Fernandez	(South Africa) Ilana Kloss (United States) Barbara Hallquist (Brazil) Patricia Medrado (Australia) Cynthia Doerner
18 Sep	World Tennis Classic; Montreal, Canada; Colgate Series (A); Clay – $40,000 – 32S/18D	(United States) Caroline Stoll; 6–3, 6–2	(France) Françoise Dürr	(United States) Laura duPont (South Africa) Yvonne Vermaak	(United States) Dana Gilbert (United Kingdom) Glynis Coles (United States) Diane Desfor (United Kingdom) Michelle Tyler
18 Sep	World Tennis Classic; Montreal, Canada; Colgate Series (A); Clay – $40,000 – 32S/18D	(United States) Julie Anthony (United States) Billie Jean King; 6–4, 6–4	(South Africa) Ilana Kloss (South Africa) Marise Kruger	(United States) Laura duPont (South Africa) Yvonne Vermaak	(United States) Dana Gilbert (United Kingdom) Glynis Coles (United States) Diane Desfor (United Kingdom) Michelle Tyler
25 Sep	Wyler's Classic; Atlanta, United States; Colgate Series (AAA); Carpet (i) – $100,000	(United States) Chris Evert; 7–6^{(7–3)}, 0–6, 6–3	(United States) Martina Navratilova	(United Kingdom) Virginia Wade (Netherlands) Betty Stöve	(United States) Carrie Meyer (Australia) Kerry Reid (Australia) Wendy Turnbull (United States) Zenda Liess
25 Sep	Wyler's Classic; Atlanta, United States; Colgate Series (AAA); Carpet (i) – $100,000	(France) Françoise Dürr (United Kingdom) Virginia Wade; 4–6, 6–2, 6–4	(United States) Martina Navratilova (United States) Anne Smith	(United Kingdom) Virginia Wade (Netherlands) Betty Stöve	(United States) Carrie Meyer (Australia) Kerry Reid (Australia) Wendy Turnbull (United States) Zenda Liess

=== October ===
Week	Tournament	Champions	Runners-up	Semifinalists	Quarterfinalists
2 Oct	Thunderbird Classic; Phoenix, United States; Colgate Series (AA); Hard – $75,000 – 32S/16S	(United States) Martina Navratilova; 6–4, 6–2	(United States) Tracy Austin	(Australia) Kerry Reid (United Kingdom) Virginia Wade	(United States) Anne Smith (United States) Anna-Maria Fernandez (United States) Ann Kiyomura (United States) Jeanne DuVall
2 Oct	Thunderbird Classic; Phoenix, United States; Colgate Series (AA); Hard – $75,000 – 32S/16S	(United States) Tracy Austin (Netherlands) Betty Stöve; 6–4, 6–7, 6–2	(United States) Martina Navratilova (United States) Anne Smith	(Australia) Kerry Reid (United Kingdom) Virginia Wade	(United States) Anne Smith (United States) Anna-Maria Fernandez (United States) Ann Kiyomura (United States) Jeanne DuVall
9 Oct	US Indoors Championships; Minneapolis, United States; Colgate Series (AAAA); Carpet (i) – $100,000	(United States) Chris Evert; 6–7, 6–2, 6–4	(United Kingdom) Virginia Wade	(Australia) Kerry Reid (Australia) Wendy Turnbull	(United States) Barbara Potter (Netherlands) Betty Stöve (United States) Tracy Austin (Romania) Virginia Ruzici
9 Oct	US Indoors Championships; Minneapolis, United States; Colgate Series (AAAA); Carpet (i) – $100,000	(Australia) Kerry Reid (Australia) Wendy Turnbull; 6–3, 6–3	(Australia) Lesley Hunt (South Africa) Ilana Kloss	(Australia) Kerry Reid (Australia) Wendy Turnbull	(United States) Barbara Potter (Netherlands) Betty Stöve (United States) Tracy Austin (Romania) Virginia Ruzici
16 Oct	BMW Challenge; Brighton, Great Britain; Colgate Series (AA); Carpet (i) – $75,000 – 32S/16D; Singles	(Romania) Virginia Ruzici; 5–7, 6–2, 7–5	(Netherlands) Betty Stöve	(United States) Chris Evert (Australia) Kerry Reid	(West Germany) Sylvia Hanika (Socialist Federal Republic of Yugoslavia) Mima Jaušovec (Sweden) Nina Bohm (United Kingdom) Virginia Wade
16 Oct	BMW Challenge; Brighton, Great Britain; Colgate Series (AA); Carpet (i) – $75,000 – 32S/16D; Singles	(Netherlands) Betty Stöve (United Kingdom) Virginia Wade; 6–0, 7–6	(South Africa) Ilana Kloss (United States) JoAnne Russell	(United States) Chris Evert (Australia) Kerry Reid	(West Germany) Sylvia Hanika (Socialist Federal Republic of Yugoslavia) Mima Jaušovec (Sweden) Nina Bohm (United Kingdom) Virginia Wade
23 Oct	Porsche Tennis Grand Prix; Filderstadt, West Germany; Colgate Series (A); Carpet (i) – $35,000	(United States) Tracy Austin; 6–3, 6–3	(Netherlands) Betty Stöve	(Socialist Federal Republic of Yugoslavia) Mima Jaušovec (Romania) Virginia Ruzici	(Italy) Sabina Simmonds (Australia) Lesley Hunt (Sweden) Nina Bohm (West Germany) Heidi Eisterlehner
23 Oct	Porsche Tennis Grand Prix; Filderstadt, West Germany; Colgate Series (A); Carpet (i) – $35,000	(United States) Tracy Austin (Netherlands) Betty Stöve; 6–3, 6–2	(Socialist Federal Republic of Yugoslavia) Mima Jaušovec (Romania) Virginia Ruzici	(Socialist Federal Republic of Yugoslavia) Mima Jaušovec (Romania) Virginia Ruzici	(Italy) Sabina Simmonds (Australia) Lesley Hunt (Sweden) Nina Bohm (West Germany) Heidi Eisterlehner
30 Oct	Rio de La Plata Championships; Buenos Aires, Argentina; Colgate Series (A); Clay – $35,000	(United States) Caroline Stoll; 6–3, 6–1	(Argentina) Emilse Raponi	(Czechoslovakia) Regina Maršíková (Argentina) Ivanna Madruga	(Australia) Cynthia Doerner (France) Françoise Dürr (Netherlands) Elly Vessies (Argentina) Liliana Giussani
30 Oct	Rio de La Plata Championships; Buenos Aires, Argentina; Colgate Series (A); Clay – $35,000	(France) Françoise Dürr (United States) Valerie Ziegenfuss; 1–6, 6–4, 6–3	(United States) Laura duPont (Czechoslovakia) Regina Maršíková	(Czechoslovakia) Regina Maršíková (Argentina) Ivanna Madruga	(Australia) Cynthia Doerner (France) Françoise Dürr (Netherlands) Elly Vessies (Argentina) Liliana Giussani
30 Oct	Wightman Cup; London, United Kingdom; Hard (i); Team event	Great Britain; 4–3	United States		

=== November ===
Week	Tournament	Champions	Runners-up	Semifinalists	Quarterfinalists
6 Nov	Florida Federal Open; Oldsmar, United States; Colgate Series (AA); Hard – $75,000; Singles – Doubles	(United Kingdom) Virginia Wade; 6–4, 7–6^{(7–1)}	(United States) Anna-Maria Fernandez	(Czechoslovakia) Regina Maršíková (Australia) Wendy Turnbull	(United States) Martina Navratilova (Australia) Kerry Reid (United States) Renee Blount (United States) Anne White
6 Nov	Florida Federal Open; Oldsmar, United States; Colgate Series (AA); Hard – $75,000; Singles – Doubles	(United States) Martina Navratilova (United States) Anne Smith; 7–6^{(7–4)}, 6–3	(Australia) Kerry Reid (Australia) Wendy Turnbull	(Czechoslovakia) Regina Maršíková (Australia) Wendy Turnbull	(United States) Martina Navratilova (Australia) Kerry Reid (United States) Renee Blount (United States) Anne White
13 Nov	Colgate Series Championships; Palm Springs, United States; Colgate Series championships Hard – $250,000	(United States) Chris Evert; 6–3, 6–3	(United States) Martina Navratilova	(United Kingdom) Virginia Wade (Romania) Virginia Ruzici	Round robin (Czechoslovakia) Regina Maršíková (Australia) Kerry Reid (Australia) Wendy Turnbull (Netherlands) Betty Stöve
13 Nov	Colgate Series Championships; Palm Springs, United States; Colgate Series championships Hard – $250,000	(United States) Billie Jean King (United States) Martina Navratilova; 6–3, 6–4	(Australia) Kerry Reid (Australia) Wendy Turnbull	(United Kingdom) Virginia Wade (Romania) Virginia Ruzici	Round robin (Czechoslovakia) Regina Maršíková (Australia) Kerry Reid (Australia) Wendy Turnbull (Netherlands) Betty Stöve
27 Nov	Federation Cup; Melbourne, Australia; Grass – 32 teams knockout	United States; 2–1	Australia	Great Britain; Soviet Union	France; Czechoslovakia; Romania; Netherlands

== Colgate Series ==
=== Draw and seeding ===
Draw Size	Min. Direct Acceptances	Min. Qualifiers	Min. Wild Cards	Seeds
16	13	2	1	4
32	26	4	1 (Note: Two wild cards for tournaments organized outside the United States.)	8
48	42	4	2	8
64	52	8	4	16
96	82	8	6	16
128	112	8	8	16

Wild cards for the tournament had to be given to either local players or players who had won Wimbledon, the US Open, the Virginia Slims or Colgate Series championships or were previous winners of the tournament. All tournaments used a seeded draw with the number of seeds depending on the draw size.

=== Points system ===
The tournaments of the Colgate International Series were divided into four groups – AAAA, AAA, AA and A – based on prize money. Points were allocated based on these groups and the finishing position of a player in a tournament. The points allocation – with doubles points listed in brackets – was:

Group AAAA
Prize money at least $150,000
- Champion: 160 (32)
- Runner-up: 120 (24)
- Semifinalist: 80 (16)
- Quarterfinalist: 40 (8)
- Round of 16: 20 (4)
- Round of 32: 15 (3)
- Round of 64: 10

Group AAA
Prize money at least $100,000
- Champion: 120 (24)
- Runner-up: 90 (18)
- Semifinalist: 60 (12)
- Quarterfinalist: 30 (6)
- Round of 16: 15 (3)
- Round of 32: 10 (2)

Group AA
Prize money at least $75,000
- Champion: 80 (16)
- Runner-up: 60 (12)
- Semifinalist: 40 (8)
- Quarterfinalist: 20 (4)
- Round of 16: 10 (2)
- Round of 32: 5

Group A
Prize money at least $35,000
- Champion: 40 (8)
- Runner-up: 30 (6)
- Semifinalist: 20 (4)
- Quarterfinalist: 10 (2)
- Round of 16: 5

=== Points standings and bonus pool ===
No.	Player name	Points Singles	Bonus Singles	Points Doubles	Bonus Doubles	Total Bonus
1	Chris Evert (USA)	740	$100,000	–	–	$100,000
2	Virginia Wade (GBR)	635	$65,000	100	$7,500	$72,500
3	Kerry Reid (AUS)	560	$45,000	201	$22,000	$67,000
4	Martina Navratilova (USA)	540	$35,000	146	$13,000	$48,000
5	Virginia Ruzici (ROU)	470	$30,000	92	$6,000	$36,000
6	Evonne Goolagong Cawley (AUS)	450	$25,000	75	$3,800	$28,800
7	Betty Stöve (NED)	445	$22,500	142	$11,500	$34,000
8	Wendy Turnbull (AUS)	430	$20,000	168	$16,000	$36,000
9	Regina Maršíková (TCH)	370	$19,000	55	$2,500	$21,500
10	Tracy Austin (USA)	310	$17,000	–	–	$17,000

The total bonus pool for the Colgate Series was $675,000, an increase of $75,000 compared to the previous year, and was divided over singles ($540,000) and doubles ($135,000). The 35 highest points ranking singles players and the top 20 in doubles qualified to receive a share of the bonus pool. The distribution ranged from $100,000 for the first placed singles player to $3,000 for the 35th placed player. The first placed doubles player received $22,000 bonus while the 20th placed player received $2,000. In order to be eligible for a share of the respective bonus pools players had to a) participate in a minimum of seven singles or three doubles tournaments and b) accept invitation for the series championships if qualified based on merit. Players who ended on equal points were ranked in order of the number of tournaments played.

== Virginia Slims Circuit ==
=== Points standings and prize money ===
No.	Player name	T	Points	Point avg.
1	Martina Navratilova (USA)	9	1,635	181.66
2	Evonne Goolagong Cawley (AUS)	6	910	151.66
3	Betty Stöve (NED)	7	753	107.57
4	Virginia Wade (GBR)	9	745	82.77
5	Billie Jean King (USA)	9	686	76.22
6	Wendy Turnbull (USA)	9	623	69.22
7	Rosemary Casals (USA)	10	608	60.80
8	Kerry Reid (AUS)	7	455	65.00
9	Chris Evert (USA)	2	360	180.00
10	Tracy Austin (USA)	4	345	86.25

No.	Player name	T	Prize money
1	Martina Navratilova (USA)	9	$214,350
2	Evonne Goolagong Cawley (AUS)	6	$114,450
3	Billie Jean King (USA)	9	$68,025
4	Betty Stöve (NED)	7	$67,000
5	Wendy Turnbull (USA)	9	$63,300
6	Virginia Wade (GBR)	9	$58,900
7	Rosemary Casals (USA)	10	$52,300
8	Kerry Reid (AUS)	7	$36,700
9	Chris Evert (USA)	2	$30,500
10	Dianne Fromholtz (AUS)	8	$22,450

Combined prize money for singles and doubles events. The points, named 'Silver Ginny Points', were allocated as follows:

- Winner: 210
- Runner-up: 150
- Third: 110
- Semifinalist: 100
- Quarterfinalist: 65
- Round of 16: 30
- Round of 32: 8

== WTA Tour ==
=== Year-end rankings ===
Below are the 1978 WTA year-end rankings (December 10, 1978) in both singles and doubles competition:

Singles Year-end Ranking
No.	Player name	T	M	Points	1977	Change
1	Martina Navratilova (USA)	18	87	15.660	3	▲2
2	Chris Evert (USA)	10	56	15.192	1	▼1
3	Evonne Goolagong Cawley (AUS)	11	48	11.688	NR	NR
4	Virginia Wade (GBR)	22	92	9.879	4	Steady
5	Billie Jean King (USA)	10	35	9.183	2	▼3
6	Tracy Austin (USA)	14	64	8.531	12	▲6
7	Wendy Turnbull (AUS)	22	79	8.171	9	▲2
8	Betty Stöve (NED)	21	72	7.336	7	▼1
9	Kerry Reid (AUS)	21	79	7.111	10	▲1
10	Dianne Fromholtz (AUS)	14	39	7.032	8	▼2
11	Rosie Casals (USA)	14	38	6.295	6	▼5
12	Virginia Ruzici (ROU)	28	90	6.095	16	▲4
13	Pam Shriver (USA)	12	45	5.967	NR	NR
14	Regina Maršíková (TCH)	32	91	5.559	20	▲6
15	Kathy May (USA)	16	38	4.706	21	▲6
16	Marita Redondo (USA)	17	46	4.649	NR	NR
17	Greer Stevens (RSA)	7	15	4.628	13	▼4
18	Marise Kruger (RSA)	17	31	4.559	25	▲7
19	Mima Jaušovec (YUG)	20	48	4.527	11	▼8
20	Anne Smith (USA)	8	28	4.161	NR	NR

=== Prize money leaders ===
No.	Player name	Prize money
1	Chris Evert (USA)	$454,486
2	Martina Navratilova (USA)	$450,757
3	Virginia Wade (GBR)	$300,027
4	Kerry Reid (AUS)	$208,766
5	Wendy Turnbull (AUS)	$189,583
6	Evonne Goolagong Cawley (AUS)	$180,844
7	Betty Stöve (NED)	$177,243
8	Virginia Ruzici (ROU)	$151,379
9	Billie Jean King (USA)	$149,492
10	Regina Maršíková (TCH)	$88,840

== See also ==
- 1978 Men's Grand Prix circuit
