= 1978 U.S. Clay Court Championships – Women's singles =

Women's singles
- 1978 U.S. Clay Court Championships

Final
- Champion: (United States) Dana Gilbert
- Runner-up: (Argentina) Viviana González
- Score: 6–2, 6–3

Details
- Draw: 48
- Seeds: 8

Events
Singles	men	women
Doubles	men	women
← 1977 ·	U.S. Clay Court Championships	· 1979 →

Laura duPont was the defending champion but was upset in her first match against Kate Latham. College amateur Dana Gilbert won the title beating Viviana González in the final.

== Seeds ==
A champion seed is indicated in bold text while text in italics indicates the round in which that seed was eliminated.

1. (Socialist Federal Republic of Yugoslavia) Mima Jaušovec (first round)
2. (Romania) Virginia Ruzici (third round)
3. (United States) Kathy May (first round)
4. (United States) Janet Newberry (semifinals)
5. (United States) Laura duPont (second round)
6. (United States) Jeanne Evert (semifinals)
7. (South Africa) Yvonne Vermaak (second round)
8. (United States) Jeanne DuVall (quarterfinals)

== Draw ==
=== Key ===
- Q = Qualifier
- WC = Wild card
- LL = Lucky loser
- Alt = Alternate
- SE = Special exempt
- PR = Protected ranking
- ITF = ITF entry
- JE = Junior exempt
- w/o = Walkover
- r = Retired
- d = Defaulted
- SR = Special ranking

=== Finals ===
Quarterfinals
**(Argentina) Viviana González**	**7**	**7**
(United States) Kate Latham	5	5
4	**(United States) Janet Newberry**	**6**	**6**
(United States) Caroline Stoll	2	1
6	**(United States) Jeanne Evert**	6	**6**	**8**
(United States) Valerie Ziegenfuss	**7**	1	6
8	(United States) Jeanne DuVall	3	4
WC	**(United States) Dana Gilbert**	**6**	**6**

Semifinals
**(Argentina) Viviana González**	**7**	**6**
4	(United States) Janet Newberry	5	4
6	(United States) Jeanne Evert	**6**	2	5
WC	**(United States) Dana Gilbert**	1	**6**	**7**

Final
(Argentina) Viviana González	2	3
WC	**(United States) Dana Gilbert**	**6**	**6**

=== Top half ===
==== Section 1 ====
First round
1	(Socialist Federal Republic of Yugoslavia) M Jaušovec	**6**	4	0
**(Argentina) V González**	1	**6**	**6**
(United States) B Nagelsen	**6**	5	1
**(United States) P Smith**	3	**7**	**6**
**(United States) Z Liess**	**6**	**6**
(United States) B Bruning	2	2
**(United States) K Latham**	**6**	**6**
(Brazil) P Medrado	1	4

Second round
**(Argentina) V González**	**6**	**6**
(United Kingdom) G Coles	4	0
(United States) C Reynolds	5	2
**(United States) P Smith**	**7**	**6**
(Australia) P Whytcross	0	4
**(United States) Z Liess**	**6**	**6**
**(United States) K Latham**	**6**	**6**
5	(United States) L duPont	2	0

Third round
**(Argentina) V González**	**7**	**6**	**6**
(United States) P Smith	6	1	3
(United States) Z Liess	**6**	1	1
**(United States) K Latham**	4	**6**	**6**

Quarterfinals
**(Argentina) V González**	**7**	**7**
(United States) K Latham	5	5

==== Section 2 ====
First round
WC	**(United States) K Jordan**	**6**	**7**
(Argentina) C Casabianca	2	5
(United States) D Desfor	5	1
**(United States) P Teeguarden**	**7**	**6**
7	**(South Africa) Y Vermaak**	**6**	4	**6**
(Argentina) I Madruga	1	**6**	2
(United States) S Collins	1	3
**(United States) C Stoll**	**6**	**6**

Second round
4	**(United States) J Newberry**	2	**7**	**6**
WC	(United States) K Jordan	**6**	5	1
(United States) P Teeguarden	4	6
**(Sweden) H Anliot**	**6**	**7**
7	(South Africa) Y Vermaak	**7**	4	0
**(United States) R Gerulaitis**	5	**6**	**6**
(United States) S McInerney
(United States) C Stoll

Third round
4	**(United States) J Newberry**	**6**	**6**
(Sweden) H Anliot	2	4
(United States) R Gerulaitis	0	3
**(United States) C Stoll**	**6**	**6**

Quarterfinals
4	**(United States) J Newberry**	**6**	**6**
(United States) C Stoll	2	1

=== Bottom half ===
==== Section 3 ====
First round
(United States) W Overton	2	**6**	3
**(Australia) C O'Neil**	**6**	2	**6**
**(United States) P Louie**	**6**	4	**6**
(United States) K Kuykendall	4	**6**	3
(Australia) L Hunt	6	0
**(Australia) C Doerner**	**7**	**6**
**(United States) C Meyer**	**6**	**6**
3	(United States) K May	4	3

Second round
6	**(United States) J Evert**	**7**	**6**
(Australia) C O'Neil	5	2
(United States) B Jordan	**7**	6	4
**(United States) P Louie**	5	**7**	**6**
(Australia) C Doerner	2	1
**(United States) V Ziegenfuss**	**6**	**6**
Q	(United States) N Ornstein	1	1
**(United States) C Meyer**	**6**	**6**

Third round
6	**(United States) J Evert**	**7**	**6**
(United States) P Louie	5	2
**(United States) V Ziegenfuss**	2	**7**	**6**
(United States) C Meyer	**6**	5	4

Quarterfinals
6	**(United States) J Evert**	6	**6**	**8**
(United States) V Ziegenfuss	**7**	1	6

==== Section 4 ====
First round
Q	(United States) R Harris	5	4
**(United States) S Walsh**	**7**	**6**
(United States) B Hallquist	1	2
8	**(United States) J DuVall**	**6**	**6**
Q	(Japan) S Yonezawa	3	2
WC	**(United States) D Gilbert**	**6**	**6**
(Denmark) H Sparre-Viragh	3	3
**(Australia) A Tobin**	**6**	**6**

Second round
**(United States) L Forood**	**6**	**6**
(United States) S Walsh	3	3
Q	(Belgium) M Gurdal	1	3
8	**(United States) J DuVall**	**6**	**6**
WC	**(United States) D Gilbert**	**6**	**6**
(France) F Thibault	3	2
(Australia) A Tobin	4	2
2	**(Romania) V Ruzici**	**6**	**6**

Third round
(United States) L Forood	**7**	3	4
8	**(United States) J DuVall**	5	**6**	**6**
WC	**(United States) D Gilbert**	**6**	**6**
2	(Romania) V Ruzici	3	4

Quarterfinals
8	(United States) J DuVall	3	4
WC	**(United States) D Gilbert**	**6**	**6**
