= 1978 U.S. Clay Court Championships – Women's doubles =

Women's doubles
- 1978 U.S. Clay Court Championships

Final
- Champions: (Sweden) Helena Anliot (Denmark) Helle Sparre-Viragh
- Runners-up: (United States) Barbara Hallquist (United States) Sheila McInerney
- Score: 6–3, 6–1

Events
Singles	men	women
Doubles	men	women
← 1977 ·	U.S. Clay Court Championships	· 1979 →

Linky Boshoff and Ilana Kloss were the defending champions but did not participate due to Boshoff's retirement and Kloss' return to World TeamTennis. Helena Anliot and Helle Sparre-Viragh won the title after defeating Barbara Hallquist and Sheila McInerney in the final.

== Seeds ==
A champion seed is indicated in bold text while text in italics indicates the round in which that seed was eliminated.

1. (Socialist Federal Republic of Yugoslavia) Mima Jaušovec / (Romania) Virginia Ruzici (quarterfinals)
2. (United States) Laura duPont / (United States) Sharon Walsh (first round)
3. (Australia) Chris O'Neil / (Australia) Pam Whytcross (first round)
4. (United States) Kathy May / (United States) Betsy Nagelsen (semifinals)

== Draw ==
=== Key ===
- Q = Qualifier
- WC = Wild card
- LL = Lucky loser
- Alt = Alternate
- SE = Special exempt
- PR = Protected ranking
- ITF = ITF entry
- JE = Junior exempt
- w/o = Walkover
- r = Retired
- d = Defaulted
- SR = Special ranking

=== Finals ===
Semifinals
**(United States) Barbara Hallquist** **(United States) Sheila McInerney**	**6**	5	**6**
(United Kingdom) Glynis Coles (United States) Carrie Meyer	3	**7**	3
4	(United States) Kathy May (United States) Betsy Nagelsen	**6**	2	5
**(Sweden) Helena Anliot** **(Denmark) Helle Sparre-Viragh**	4	**6**	**7**

Final
(United States) Barbara Hallquist (United States) Sheila McInerney	3	1
**(Sweden) Helena Anliot** **(Denmark) Helle Sparre-Viragh**	**6**	**6**

=== Top half ===
First round
**(United States) B Jordan** **(United States) C Reynolds**	**6**	**6**
(United States) R Harris (United States) N Ornstein	4	3
**(United States) W Overton** **(United States) V Ziegenfuss**	**6**	**6**
Brown (United States) S Collins	0	1
**(United States) D Desfor** **(United States) G Galt**	**6**	**7**
(Argentina) V González (Argentina) I Madruga	3	6
**(Belgium) M Gurdal** **(Japan) N Sato**	2	**7**	**6**
3	(Australia) C O'Neil (Australia) P Whytcross	**6**	5	3

Second round
1	**(Socialist Federal Republic of Yugoslavia) M Jaušovec** **(Romania) V Ruzici**	6	**6**	**6**
(United States) B Jordan (United States) C Reynolds	**7**	4	3
**(United States) B Hallquist** **(United States) S McInerney**	1	**6**	**6**
(United States) W Overton (United States) V Ziegenfuss	**6**	4	4
**(United States) D Desfor** **(United States) G Galt**	**6**	**6**
(United States) Z Liess (United States) B Smith	4	4
**(United Kingdom) G Coles** **(United States) C Meyer**	**6**	**6**
(Belgium) M Gurdal (Japan) N Sato	2	3

Quarterfinals
1	(Socialist Federal Republic of Yugoslavia) M Jaušovec (Romania) V Ruzici	2	4
**(United States) B Hallquist** **(United States) S McInerney**	**6**	**6**
(United States) D Desfor (United States) G Galt	2	3
**(United Kingdom) G Coles** **(United States) C Meyer**	**6**	**6**

Semifinals
**(United States) B Hallquist** **(United States) S McInerney**	**6**	5	**6**
(United Kingdom) G Coles (United States) C Meyer	3	**7**	3

=== Bottom half ===
First round
**(United States) S Acker** **(United States) D Gilbert**	4	**6**	**6**
(United States) K Latham (South Africa) Y Vermaak	**6**	4	1
**(United States) P Smith** **(France) F Thibault**	**6**	**6**
(Australia) L Harrison (United States) N Weigel	1	1
**(United States) J DuVall** **(United States) C Stoll**	**7**	**6**
(United States) K Kuykendall (United States) P Louie	6	1
**(Sweden) H Anliot** **(Denmark) H Sparre-Viragh**	3	**6**	**6**
2	(United States) L duPont (United States) S Walsh	**6**	4	2

Second round
4	**(United States) K May** **(United States) B Nagelsen**	**6**	**7**
(United States) S Acker (United States) D Gilbert	4	6
(Australia) C Doerner (United States) R Gerulaitis	3	6
**(United States) P Smith** **(France) F Thibault**	**6**	**7**
(United States) J DuVall (United States) C Stoll	2	4
**(Australia) N Gregory** **(Australia) A Tobin**	**6**	**6**
(United States) B Bruning (United States) L Forood	5	5
**(Sweden) H Anliot** **(Denmark) H Sparre-Viragh**	**7**	**7**

Quarterfinals
4	**(United States) K May** **(United States) B Nagelsen**	**6**	**7**
(United States) P Smith (France) F Thibault	2	6
(Australia) N Gregory (Australia) A Tobin	4	5
**(Sweden) H Anliot** **(Denmark) H Sparre-Viragh**	**6**	**7**

Semifinals
4	(United States) K May (United States) B Nagelsen	**6**	2	5
**(Sweden) H Anliot** **(Denmark) H Sparre-Viragh**	4	**6**	**7**
