= 1978 US Open – Women's singles =

Women's singles
- 1978 US Open

Final
- Champion: (United States) Chris Evert
- Runner-up: (United States) Pam Shriver
- Score: 7–5, 6–4

Details
- Draw: 96
- Seeds: 16

Events
Singles	men	women		boys	girls
Doubles	men	women	mixed	boys	girls
WC Singles	men	women	quad
WC Doubles	men	women	quad
Legends	men	women	mixed
- US Open

Three-time defending champion Chris Evert defeated Pam Shriver in the final, 7–5, 6–4 to win the women's singles tennis title at the 1978 US Open. It was her fourth consecutive US Open title (an Open Era record), her fourth US Open singles title overall, and her eighth major singles title overall. For the third consecutive year, Evert did not lose a set during the tournament. At 16 years and two months of age, Shriver was the youngest major finalist in the Open Era and the youngest finalist at the US Open, records that remain unbroken.

This was the first edition of the US Open to be played on hard courts, and the first to be held at the National Tennis Center in Flushing Meadows, relocating from its former site at Forest Hills.

This marked the final major appearance for two-time major champion and former singles world No. 2 Nancy Richey; she lost in the first round to Lesley Hunt.

== Seeds ==
The seeded players are listed below. Chris Evert is the champion; others show the round in which they were eliminated.

1. (United States) Martina Navratilova (semifinalist)
2. (United States) Chris Evert (champion)
3. (United Kingdom) Virginia Wade (third round)
4. (Australia) Wendy Turnbull (semifinalist)
5. (United States) Tracy Austin (quarterfinalist)
6. (Australia) Dianne Fromholtz (third round)
7. (Netherlands) Betty Stöve (fourth round)
8. (Australia) Kerry Reid (fourth round)
9. (South Africa) Marise Kruger (first round)
10. (Socialist Federal Republic of Yugoslavia) Mima Jaušovec (second round)
11. (Romania) Virginia Ruzici (quarterfinalist)
12. (Czechoslovakia) Regina Maršíková (fourth round)
13. (United States) Marita Redondo (fourth round)
14. (United States) JoAnne Russell (second round)
15. (United States) Kathy May (quarterfinalist)
16. (United States) Pam Shriver (finalist)

== Draw ==
=== Key ===
- Q = Qualifier
- WC = Wild card
- LL = Lucky loser
- r = Retired

=== Final eight ===
Quarterfinals
1	(United States) Martina Navratilova	6	6
11	(Romania) Virginia Ruzici	3	2
(Australia) Lesley Hunt	2	0
16	(United States) Pam Shriver	6	6
15	(United States) Kathy May	6	6	3
4	(Australia) Wendy Turnbull	3	7	6
5	(United States) Tracy Austin	5	1
2	(United States) Chris Evert	7	6

Semifinals
1	(United States) Martina Navratilova	6	6
16	(United States) Pam Shriver	7	7
4	(Australia) Wendy Turnbull	3	0
2	(United States) Chris Evert	6	6

Finals
16	(United States) Pam Shriver	5	4
2	(United States) Chris Evert	7	6

=== Earlier rounds ===
==== Section 1 ====
First round
(France) Lovera	6	5	6
(South Africa) Harford	3	7	2
(Czechoslovakia) Strachoňová	6	7
(Sweden) Wikstedt	4	5
(United States) duPont	6	6
(United Kingdom) Tyler	4	3
(Czechoslovakia) Tomanová	6	6
(Brazil) Medrado	4	3

Second round
1	(United States) Navratilova	6	6
(France) Lovera	1	1
(Hungary) Pinterová	6	7
(Czechoslovakia) Strachoňová	2	6
(United States) duPont	2	1
(United States) Kiyomura	6	6
(Czechoslovakia) Tomanová	6	4
10	(Socialist Federal Republic of Yugoslavia) Jaušovec	2	2	r

Third round
1	(United States) Navratilova	6	6
(Hungary) Pinterová	1	2
(United States) Kiyomura	6	2	6
(Czechoslovakia) Tomanová	3	6	3

Fourth round
1	(United States) Navratilova	6	6
(United States) Kiyomura	4	2

==== Section 2 ====
First round
11	(Romania) Ruzici	6	6
(Australia) Whytcross	1	0
Q	(Japan) Yonezawa	6	7
(United Kingdom) Fayter	3	5
(United States) DuVall	6	6
(Romania) Simionescu	4	3
6	(Australia) Fromholtz	6	6
(United States) Harter	1	4

Second round
11	(Romania) Ruzici	6	5	6
(France) Thibault	4	7	2
Q	(Japan) Yonezawa	7	6	1
(United States) Louie	5	7	6
(United States) DuVall	3	4
(United States) Margolin	6	6
(United States) Desfor	1	3
6	(Australia) Fromholtz	6	6

Third round
11	(Romania) Ruzici	6	6
(United States) Louie	2	3
(United States) Margolin	6	7
6	(Australia) Fromholtz	2	5

Fourth round
11	(Romania) Ruzici	4	7	6
(United States) Margolin	6	6	4

==== Section 3 ====
First round
(South Africa) Cuypers	6	3	6
(Denmark) Sparre-Viragh	1	6	3
(United States) Meyer	7	6
(United States) Kemmer Shaw	6	1
(Australia) Hunt	6	4	6
(United States) Richey	3	6	4
14	(United States) Russell	6	6
(Canada) Blackwood	1	4

Second round
3	(United Kingdom) Wade	6	6
(South Africa) Cuypers	0	1
(United States) Forood	7	6	7
(United States) Meyer	5	7	6
(South Africa) Vermaak	3	6	4
(Australia) Hunt	6	2	6
(Czechoslovakia) Mandlíková	6	3	6
14	(United States) Russell	2	6	2

Third round
3	(United Kingdom) Wade	3	6	3
(United States) Forood	6	2	6
(Australia) Hunt	5	6	6
(Czechoslovakia) Mandlíková	7	2	4

Fourth round
(United States) Forood	3	6	3
(Australia) Hunt	6	3	6

==== Section 4 ====
First round
16	(United States) Shriver	6	6
(United States) Reynolds	1	1
(United States) Evert J	4	6	6
(United States) Moulton	6	0	1
(Australia) Tobin	6	6
Q	(United States) Hutnick	3	1
8	(Australia) Reid	6	6
(United States) Anthony	0	1

Second round
16	(United States) Shriver	6	7
(United States) Walsh	3	6
(United States) Evert J	6	6
(Argentina) Giscafré	1	4
(United States) Overton	6	4	3
(Australia) Tobin	0	6	6
Q	(United States) White	2	2
8	(Australia) Reid	6	6

Third round
16	(United States) Shriver	6	7
(United States) Evert J	2	5
(Australia) Tobin	0	1
8	(Australia) Reid	6	6

Fourth round
16	(United States) Shriver	6	6
8	(Australia) Reid	2	4

==== Section 5 ====
First round
7	(Netherlands) Stöve	6	6
(United States) Holladay	3	2
(United States) Gerulaitis	3	6	6
(United States) McInerney	6	4	1
(United States) Tolleson	6	6
(United States) Latham	3	3
15	(United States) May	6	6
(Belgium) Gurdal	4	0

Second round
7	(Netherlands) Stöve	6	6
(Argentina) González	1	0
(United Kingdom) Hobbs	7	6
(United States) Gerulaitis	6	2
(United States) Tolleson	6	6
(United States) Potter	2	4
(Australia) Doerner	4	2
15	(United States) May	6	6

Third round
7	(Netherlands) Stöve	7	6
(United Kingdom) Hobbs	6	2
(United States) Tolleson	1	1
15	(United States) May	6	6

Fourth round
7	(Netherlands) Stöve	4	6
15	(United States) May	6	7

==== Section 6 ====
First round
13	(United States) Redondo	7	6
(United States) Bruning	6	1
(South Africa) Kloss	6	6	6
(United States) Richards	2	7	4
(United States) Collins	7	6
(United States) Smith	5	4
4	(Australia) Turnbull	6	7
(West Germany) Ebbinghaus	2	5

Second round
13	(United States) Redondo	7	7
(Argentina) Casabianca	5	5
(South Africa) Kloss	3	6	6
(United States) Ziegenfuss	6	3	4
(United States) Collins	6	6
(United States) Hepner	1	1
(United States) Hallquist	2	3
4	(Australia) Turnbull	6	6

Third round
13	(United States) Redondo	2	7	6
(South Africa) Kloss	6	6	1
(United States) Collins	5	6	4
4	(Australia) Turnbull	7	1	6

Fourth round
13	(United States) Redondo	2	7	2
4	(Australia) Turnbull	6	6	6

==== Section 7 ====
First round
5	(United States) Austin	6	6
(United States) Bostrom	0	1
Q	(Argentina) Madruga	7	6
(Sweden) Ekblom	6	1
(United States) Smith	6	7
(United States) Jordan	1	6
Q	(West Germany) Bunge	7	7
9	(South Africa) Kruger	6	6

Second round
5	(United States) Austin	6	6
(Australia) O'Neil	3	0
Q	(United States) Fernandez	6	6
Q	(Argentina) Madruga	2	2
(United States) Smith	6	7
(United States) Gilbert	1	6
(United States) Kuykendall	3	3
Q	(West Germany) Bunge	6	6

Third round
5	(United States) Austin	6	6
Q	(United States) Fernandez	1	2
(United States) Smith	6	6
Q	(West Germany) Bunge	3	1

Fourth round
5	(United States) Austin	6	6
(United States) Smith	4	3

==== Section 8 ====
First round
12	(Czechoslovakia) Maršíková	7	6
(United States) Teeguarden	5	3
Q	(United States) Jordan	3	6	6
(United States) Nagelsen	6	3	4
(United States) Stoll	6	6
(United Kingdom) Coles	0	1
(United States) Ganz	7	1	6
(West Germany) Hanika	5	6	4

Second round
12	(Czechoslovakia) Maršíková	6	6
Q	(Netherlands) Vessies	2	1
Q	(United States) Jordan	4	4
(United States) Liess	6	6
(United States) Stoll	5	7	6
(Sweden) Anliot	7	5	2
(United States) Ganz	0	4
2	(United States) Evert C	6	6

Third round
12	(Czechoslovakia) Maršíková	6	6
(United States) Liess	4	1
(United States) Stoll	1	5
2	(United States) Evert C	6	7

Fourth round
12	(Czechoslovakia) Maršíková	4	1
2	(United States) Evert C	6	6

Preceded by 1978 Wimbledon Championships – Women's singles	Grand Slam women's singles	Succeeded by 1978 Australian Open – Women's singles
