= 1978 US Open – Women's doubles =

Women's doubles
- 1978 US Open

Final
- Champions: (United States) Billie Jean King (Czechoslovakia) Martina Navratilova
- Runners-up: (Australia) Kerry Reid (Australia) Wendy Turnbull
- Score: 7–6, 6–4

Details
- Draw: 48
- Seeds: 8

Events
Singles	men	women		boys	girls
Doubles	men	women	mixed	boys	girls
WC Singles	men	women	quad
WC Doubles	men	women	quad
Legends	men	women	mixed
← 1977 ·	US Open	· 1979 →

Martina Navratilova and Betty Stöve were the defending champions, but competed this year with different partners.

Navratilova teamed up with Billie Jean King and successfully defended her title by defeating Kerry Reid and Wendy Turnbull 7–6, 6–4 in the final.

Stöve teamed up with Chris Evert and lost in first round to Betsy Nagelsen and Pam Shriver.

== Seeds ==
1. (United States) Billie Jean King / (Czechoslovakia) Martina Navratilova (champions)
2. (Australia) Kerry Reid / (Australia) Wendy Turnbull (final)
3. (United States) Chris Evert / (Netherlands) Betty Stöve (first round)
4. (Socialist Federal Republic of Yugoslavia) Mima Jaušovec / (Romania) Virginia Ruzici (second round)
5. (France) Françoise Dürr / (United Kingdom) Virginia Wade (semifinals)
6. (South Africa) Ilana Kloss / (South Africa) Marise Kruger (third round)
7. (Czechoslovakia) Regina Maršíková / (United States) Pam Teeguarden (third round)
8. (United States) Ann Kiyomura / (United Kingdom) Sue Mappin (third round)

== Draw ==
=== Key ===
- Q = Qualifier
- WC = Wild card
- LL = Lucky loser
- Alt = Alternate
- ITF = ITF entry
- PR = Protected ranking
- SR = Special ranking
- SE = Special exempt
- JE = Junior exempt
- JR = Junior Accelerator Programme entrant
- CO = College Accelerator Programme entrant
- NG = Next Gen Accelerator Program entrant
- w/o = Walkover
- r = Retired
- d = Defaulted

=== Finals ===
Quarterfinals
1	(United States) Billie Jean King (Czechoslovakia) Martina Navratilova	7	6
(South Africa) Tanya Harford (United Kingdom) Anne Hobbs	5	1
(United States) Kathy Jordan (United States) Wendy White	1	6	1
5	(France) Françoise Dürr (United Kingdom) Virginia Wade	6	4	6
(United States) Tracy Austin (United States) Kathy May	2	6	4
(United States) Betsy Nagelsen (United States) Pam Shriver	6	3	6
(Australia) Chris O'Neil (United States) Paula Smith	3	2
2	(Australia) Kerry Reid (Australia) Wendy Turnbull	6	6

Semifinals
1	(United States) Billie Jean King (Czechoslovakia) Martina Navratilova	6	6
5	(France) Françoise Dürr (United Kingdom) Virginia Wade	2	3
(United States) Betsy Nagelsen (United States) Pam Shriver	4	6	5
2	(Australia) Kerry Reid (Australia) Wendy Turnbull	6	1	7

Final
1	(United States) Billie Jean King (Czechoslovakia) Martina Navratilova	7	6
2	(Australia) Kerry Reid (Australia) Wendy Turnbull	6	4

=== Top half ===
==== Section 1 ====
First round
1	(United States) BJ King (Czechoslovakia) M Navratilova	6	6
(United States) J Evert (United States) K Kuykendall	1	0
(Canada) M Blackwood (United Kingdom) J Fayter	6	3	6
(United States) J Stratton (Sweden) M Wikstedt	3	6	4
7	(Czechoslovakia) R Maršíková (United States) P Teeguarden	6	6
(United States) D Gilbert (United States) K Latham	1	1
(United States) R Blount (Brazil) P Medrado	3	4
(South Africa) T Harford (United Kingdom) A Hobbs	6	6

Second round
1	(United States) BJ King (Czechoslovakia) M Navratilova	6	7
(United States) W Overton (United States) V Ziegenfuss	2	6
(Canada) M Blackwood (United Kingdom) J Fayter	6	6
(United States) S Collins (United States) J DuVall	2	4
7	(Czechoslovakia) R Maršíková (United States) P Teeguarden	6	6
(Belgium) M Gurdal (Japan) N Sato	1	3
(United States) T Holladay (United States) R Richards	7	6	3
(South Africa) T Harford (United Kingdom) A Hobbs	6	7	6

Third round
1	(United States) BJ King (Czechoslovakia) M Navratilova	6	6
(Canada) M Blackwood (United Kingdom) J Fayter	2	1
7	(Czechoslovakia) R Maršíková (United States) P Teeguarden	3	6	5
(South Africa) T Harford (United Kingdom) A Hobbs	6	2	7

Quarterfinals
1	(United States) BJ King (Czechoslovakia) M Navratilova	7	6
(South Africa) T Harford (United Kingdom) A Hobbs	5	1

==== Section 2 ====
First round
4	(Socialist Federal Republic of Yugoslavia) M Jaušovec (Romania) V Ruzici	7	6
(United States) F Hutnick (United States) K McDaniel	5	0
(Australia) C Doerner (United States) R Gerulaitis	6	4	6
(Czechoslovakia) H Strachoňová (West Germany) R Tomanová	4	6	2
5	(France) F Dürr (United Kingdom) V Wade	7	6
(United States) K Harter (United States) C Stoll	5	3
(South Africa) B Cuypers (United States) K Shaw	6	5	7
(United States) B Bruning (United States) R Fox	4	7	6

Second round
4	(Socialist Federal Republic of Yugoslavia) M Jaušovec (Romania) V Ruzici	7	3	4
(United States) K Jordan (United States) W White	6	6	6
(New Zealand) C Newton (Australia) P Whytcross	7	6
(Australia) C Doerner (United States) R Gerulaitis	5	4
5	(France) F Dürr (United Kingdom) V Wade	7	6
(United Kingdom) M Tyler (South Africa) Y Vermaak	6	3
(South Africa) B Cuypers (United States) K Shaw	6	6
(United States) J Russell (United States) S Tolleson	0	2

Third round
(United States) K Jordan (United States) W White	6	6
(New Zealand) C Newton (Australia) P Whytcross	2	0
5	(France) F Dürr (United Kingdom) V Wade	5	6	6
(South Africa) B Cuypers (United States) K Shaw	7	0	1

Quarterfinals
(United States) K Jordan (United States) W White	1	6	1
5	(France) F Dürr (United Kingdom) V Wade	6	4	6

=== Bottom half ===
==== Section 3 ====
First round
(United States) Z Liess (United States) N Yeargin	0	4
(United States) T Austin (United States) K May	6	6
(United States) D Desfor (United States) G Galt	5	6	2
(United States) J Anthony (United States) A Smith	7	1	6
(United States) B Hallquist (United States) S McInerney	4	6	6
(United States) S Hagey (United States) D Morrison	6	3	3
(United States) B Nagelsen (United States) P Shriver	6	6
3	(United States) C Evert (Netherlands) B Stöve	3	2

Second round
(United States) T Austin (United States) K May	6	6
(United States) P Bostrom (Australia) K Ruddell	2	0
(United States) J Anthony (United States) A Smith	6	3
8	(United States) A Kiyomura (United Kingdom) S Mappin	7	6
(United States) B Hallquist (United States) S McInerney	5	7
(Australia) D Fromholtz (Australia) L Hunt	7	6	r
(United States) AM Fernandez (United States) M Louie	1	2
(United States) B Nagelsen (United States) P Shriver	6	6

Third round
(United States) T Austin (United States) K May	6	6
8	(United States) A Kiyomura (United Kingdom) S Mappin	3	4
(United States) B Hallquist (United States) S McInerney	2	3
(United States) B Nagelsen (United States) P Shriver	6	6

Quarterfinals
(United States) T Austin (United States) K May	2	6	4
(United States) B Nagelsen (United States) P Shriver	6	3	6

==== Section 4 ====
First round
(Australia) C O'Neil (United States) P Smith	5	6	6
(United States) S Acker (United States) S Margolin	7	4	4
(Sweden) H Anliot (United States) M Redondo	5	4
6	(South Africa) I Kloss (South Africa) M Kruger	7	6
(Australia) N Gregory (Australia) A Tobin	3	7	1
(United States) L Forood (Argentina) R Giscafré	6	6	6
(Argentina) C Casabianca (Argentina) I Madruga	3	2
2	(Australia) K Reid (Australia) W Turnbull	6	6

Second round
(Australia) C O'Neil (United States) P Smith	6	6
(United States) H Ludloff (United States) A Moulton	3	2
(United States) B Jordan (United States) C Reynolds	1	5
6	(South Africa) I Kloss (South Africa) M Kruger	6	7
(United States) L Forood (Argentina) R Giscafré	4	6	6
(West Germany) B Bunge (Denmark) H Viragh	6	3	4
(United States) L duPont (United States) S Walsh	4	4
2	(Australia) K Reid (Australia) W Turnbull	6	6

Third round
(Australia) C O'Neil (United States) P Smith	3	6	6
6	(South Africa) I Kloss (South Africa) M Kruger	6	3	3
(United States) L Forood (Argentina) R Giscafré	2	2
2	(Australia) K Reid (Australia) W Turnbull	6	6

Quarterfinals
(Australia) C O'Neil (United States) P Smith	3	3
2	(Australia) K Reid (Australia) W Turnbull	6	6
