= 1978 U.S. Clay Court Championships =

- Date: August 7–13
- Edition: 10th
- Category: Grand Prix circuit WTA Tour
- Draw: 64S / 32D (M); 48S / 24D (W)
- Prize money: $175,000 (M) $35,000 (W)
- Surface: Clay / outdoor
- Location: Indianapolis, Indiana; United States
- Venue: Indianapolis Racquet Club

Champions

Men's singles
- (United States) Jimmy Connors

Women's singles
- (United States) Dana Gilbert

Men's doubles
- (United States) Hank Pfister / (United States) Gene Mayer

Women's doubles
- (Sweden) Helena Anliot / (Denmark) Helle Sparre-Viragh
- U.S. Clay Court Championships

The 1978 U.S. Clay Court Championships was a combined men's and women's tennis tournament that was held at the Indianapolis Racquet Club in Indianapolis, Indiana in the United States and played on outdoor clay courts. It was the tenth edition of the tournament in the Open Era and was held from August 7 through August 13, 1978. First-seeded Jimmy Connors won the men's singles title and the accompanying $24,000 first-prize money, while college amateur Dana Gilbert, who entered the main draw on a wildcard, took the women's championship.

== Finals ==
=== Men's singles ===
(United States) Jimmy Connors defeated (Spain) José Higueras 7–5, 6–1

=== Women's singles ===
(United States) Dana Gilbert defeated (Argentina) Viviana González 6–2, 6–3

=== Men's doubles ===
(United States) Hank Pfister / (United States) Gene Mayer defeated (United States) Jeff Borowiak / (New Zealand) Chris Lewis 6–3, 6–1

=== Women's doubles ===
(Sweden) Helena Anliot / (Denmark) Helle Sparre-Viragh defeated (United States) Barbara Hallquist / (United States) Sheila McInerney 6–3, 6–1
