= Adelaide Yager Rameson =

American tennis player

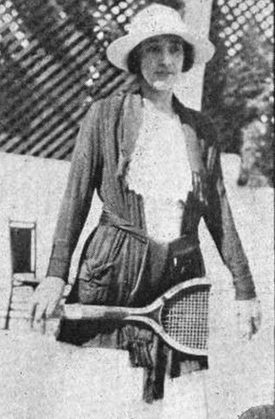
Adelaide Yager Rameson, from a 1919 publication.

Adelaide Claudia Cox Yager Rameson Taylor (January 20, 1892 – December 9, 1973) was an American tennis player from Kansas City, Missouri, later based in Los Angeles, California.

== Early life ==
Adelaide Claudia Cox was from Missouri, the daughter of Fred Millard Cox (1864–1908) and Maude Elizabeth Vrooman Cox (1870–1928).

== Career ==
Adelaide Yager of Kansas City won the lawn tennis singles competition at Missouri Valley Women's Championships in 1914. In the same year, she was runner-up to Marjorie Hires at the Central West Women's Championship in Kansas City, Missouri. Yager was selected as the top-ranked woman tennis player in Kansas City in 1914. In 1915 she was singles runner-up at the Missouri Valley Women's Championships. She was ranked in the top 30 women tennis players in America in 1915.

As Adelaide Rameson, she was Great Plains and Central States tennis singles champion and women's doubles and mixed doubles runner-up in 1918. She was also runner-up in singles and won in women's doubles at the Los Angeles City Championships, and runner-up at the national level at the 1918 U.S. Women's Clay Court Championships, defeated by Carrie Neely. She was ranked as one of the top ten American women's lawn tennis players in 1919.

== Personal life ==
Adelaide Cox married William Watson Yager in 1912. They had children together, William (1912–1982) and Ramona (1916–2001), before they divorced. She married Julius Alfred Rasmussen, a Danish man also known as Jack Rameson, in 1918. They had two sons together, Jack (1919–1961) and Fred (1922–1965). She was widowed when Jack Rameson died in 1944; she married a third time, to Paul Taylor, in 1945. She died in Glendale, California in 1973, age 81.
