= 1978 U.S. Clay Court Championships – Men's singles =

Men's singles
- 1978 U.S. Clay Court Championships

Final
- Champion: (United States) Jimmy Connors
- Runner-up: (Spain) José Higueras
- Score: 7–2, 6–1

Details
- Draw: 64
- Seeds: 16

Events
Singles	men	women
Doubles	men	women
- U.S. Clay Court Championships

Manuel Orantes was the defending champion but lost in the semifinals to Jimmy Connors. Top-seed Connors claimed the title and first prize money of $24,000 by defeating seventh-seeded José Higueras in the final.

== Seeds ==
A champion seed is indicated in bold text while text in italics indicates the round in which that seed was eliminated.

1. (United States) **Jimmy Connors (champion)**
2. (Argentina) Guillermo Vilas (quarterfinals)
3. (Spain) Manuel Orantes (semifinals)
4. (Italy) Corrado Barazzutti (semifinals)
5. (Poland) ~~Wojciech Fibak~~ (withdrew — committee unaware)
6. (United States) John McEnroe (quarterfinals)
7. (Spain) José Higueras (final)
8. (Australia) Ken Rosewall (first round)
9. (United Kingdom) John Lloyd (first round)
10. (Chile) Jaime Fillol (third round)
11. (Italy) Adriano Panatta (third round)
12. (Hungary) Balázs Taróczy (third round)
13. (Argentina) José Luis Clerc (third round)
14. (New Zealand) Chris Lewis (third round)
15. (Chile) Hans Gildemeister (second round)
16. (Australia) Phil Dent (third round)

== Draw ==
Key

- Q = Qualifier
- WC = Wild card
- LL = Lucky loser
- Alt = Alternate
- ITF = ITF entry
- PR = Protected ranking
- SR = Special ranking
- SE = Special exempt
- JE = Junior exempt
- JR = Junior Accelerator Programme entrant
- CO = College Accelerator Programme entrant
- NG = Next Gen Accelerator Program entrant
- w/o = Walkover
- r = Retired
- d = Defaulted

=== Finals ===
Quarterfinals
1	**(United States) Jimmy Connors**	3	**6**	**6**
6	(United States) John McEnroe	**6**	1	1
3	**(Spain) Manuel Orantes**	**6**	**6**
(United States) Jeff Borowiak	2	1
(Sweden) Kjell Johansson	2	4
4	**(Italy) Corrado Barazzutti**	**6**	**6**
7	**(Spain) José Higueras**	4	**6**	**6**
2	(Argentina) Guillermo Vilas	**6**	4	3

Semifinals
1	**(United States) Jimmy Connors**	**7**	**6**
3	(Spain) Manuel Orantes	5	1
4	(Italy) Corrado Barazzutti	6	**6**	2
7	**(Spain) José Higueras**	**7**	4	**6**

Final
1	**(United States) Jimmy Connors**	**7**	**6**
7	(Spain) José Higueras	5	1

=== Top half ===
==== Section 1 ====
First round
1	**(United States) J Connors**	**6**	**6**
(Australia) R Frawley	3	2
**(Switzerland) H Günthardt**	2	**7**	**6**
(United States) H Pfister	**6**	5	4
**(United States) S Denton**	5	**6**	**6**
(Italy) G Ocleppo	**7**	4	1
(United States) Chip Tolleson	3	3
10	**(Chile) J Fillol**	**6**	**6**
12	**(Hungary) B Taróczy**	5	**6**	**7**
Q	(France) P Portes	**7**	3	5
(Austria) H Kary	3	6
**(United States) G Mayer**	**6**	**7**
Q	(Israel) S Krulevitz	3	4
**(United States) V Amaya**	**6**	**6**
(France) C Roger-Vasselin	**6**	2	1
6	**(United States) J McEnroe**	3	**6**	**6**

Second round
1	**(United States) J Connors**	**6**	**6**
(Switzerland) H Günthardt	3	2
(United States) S Denton	1	2
10	**(Chile) J Fillol**	**6**	**6**
12	**(Hungary) B Taróczy**	2	**6**	**6**
(United States) G Mayer	**6**	4	4
(United States) V Amaya	5	**6**	2
6	**(United States) J McEnroe**	**7**	2	**6**

Third round
1	**(United States) J Connors**	**7**	**6**
10	(Chile) J Fillol	5	4
12	(Hungary) B Taróczy	5	2
6	**(United States) J McEnroe**	**7**	**6**

Quarterfinals
1	**(United States) J Connors**	3	**6**	**6**
6	(United States) J McEnroe	**6**	1	1

==== Section 2 ====
First round
3	**(Spain) M Orantes**	**7**	**6**
(United States) B Martin	5	3
**(United States) R Fagel**	**6**	**6**
Q	(France) G Moretton	4	2
(France) F Jauffret	4	6
**(United States) P DuPré**	**6**	**7**
(South Africa) B Mitton	**7**	3	4
13	**(Argentina) JL Clerc**	5	**6**	**6**
15	**(Chile) H Gildemeister**	3	**6**	**6**
(Australia) S Docherty	**6**	2	3
**(United States) J Borowiak**	4	**7**	**6**
(United States) B Nichols	**6**	6	0
Q	**(United States) Z Guerry**	**6**	**6**
(United States) M Davis	4	2
Q	**(Sweden) T Svensson**	3	**6**	**8**
8	(Australia) K Rosewall	**6**	2	6

Second round
3	**(Spain) M Orantes**	**6**	**7**
(United States) R Fagel	2	5
(United States) P DuPré	2	**6**	6
13	**(Argentina) JL Clerc**	**6**	4	**8**
15	(Chile) H Gildemeister	3	4
**(United States) J Borowiak**	**6**	**6**
Q	**(United States) Z Guerry**	2	**6**	**6**
Q	(Sweden) T Svensson	**6**	4	0

Third round
3	**(Spain) M Orantes**	**6**	**6**
13	(Argentina) JL Clerc	3	1
**(United States) J Borowiak**	5	**6**	**6**
Q	(United States) Z Guerry	**7**	3	4

Quarterfinals
3	**(Spain) M Orantes**	**6**	**6**
(United States) J Borowiak	2	1

=== Bottom half ===
==== Section 3 ====
First round
(Australia) B Drewett	2	6
**(United States) G Hardie**	**6**	**7**
Q	**(Austria) P Feigl**	**6**	4	**6**
(Sweden) D Palm	1	**6**	2
(United States) C Mayotte	2	1
**(Sweden) K Johansson**	**6**	**6**
**(United States) M Fishbach**	2	**6**	**6**
9	(United Kingdom) J Lloyd	**6**	3	2
11	**(Italy) A Panatta**	**6**	**6**
(Australia) D Carter	2	4
(France) É Deblicker	**6**	2	2
**(United States) H Schoenfield**	4	**6**	**6**
Q	(Chile) Á Fillol	2	4
**(South Africa) J Kriek**	**6**	**6**
(Chile) P Cornejo	1	3
4	**(Italy) C Barazzutti**	**6**	**6**

Second round
(United States) G Hardie	**7**	4	2
Q	**(Austria) P Feigl**	5	**6**	**6**
**(Sweden) K Johansson**	**6**	3	**6**
(United States) M Fishbach	4	**6**	2
11	**(Italy) A Panatta**	3	**6**	**6**
(United States) H Schoenfield	**6**	4	3
(South Africa) J Kriek	2	6
4	**(Italy) C Barazzutti**	**6**	**7**

Third round
Q	(Austria) P Feigl	**6**	4	3
**(Sweden) K Johansson**	4	**6**	**6**
11	(Italy) A Panatta	**7**	4	0
4	**(Italy) C Barazzutti**	5	**6**	**6**

Quarterfinals
(Sweden) K Johansson	2	4
4	**(Italy) C Barazzutti**	**6**	**6**

==== Section 4 ====
First round
7	**(Spain) J Higueras**	**6**	**6**
(Egypt) I El Shafei	4	2
(Romania) I Țiriac	**7**	2	3
**(Socialist Federal Republic of Yugoslavia) Ž Franulović**	5	**6**	**6**
**(Switzerland) C Dowdeswell**	3	**7**	**8**
(Chile) B Prajoux	**6**	6	6
(United States) K Richardson	1	1
14	**(New Zealand) C Lewis**	**6**	**6**
16	**(Australia) P Dent**	**6**	**6**
(United States) B Scanlon	2	1
**(Colombia) Á Betancur**	4	**7**	**7**
Q	(Italy) P Bertolucci	**6**	5	5
(United States) R Van't Hof	**7**	3	4
**(France) Y Noah**	6	**6**	**6**
(Australia) D Crealy	0	2
2	**(Argentina) G Vilas**	**6**	**6**

Second round
7	**(Spain) J Higueras**	**7**	**6**
(Socialist Federal Republic of Yugoslavia) Ž Franulović	6	1
(Switzerland) C Dowdeswell	3	**6**	2
14	**(New Zealand) C Lewis**	**6**	4	**6**
16	**(Australia) P Dent**	**6**	**6**
(Colombia) Á Betancur	4	4
(France) Y Noah	1	0
2	**(Argentina) G Vilas**	**6**	**6**

Third round
7	**(Spain) J Higueras**	**6**	**6**
14	(New Zealand) C Lewis	3	0
16	(Australia) P Dent	1	0
2	**(Argentina) G Vilas**	**6**	**6**

Quarterfinals
7	**(Spain) J Higueras**	4	**6**	**6**
2	(Argentina) G Vilas	**6**	4	3
