= 1978 Virginia Slims of Chicago =

- Date: January 30 – February 5
- Edition: 7th
- Category: Virginia Slims circuit
- Draw: 32S / 16D
- Prize money: $100,000
- Surface: Carpet (Sporteze) / indoor
- Location: Chicago, Illinois, US
- Venue: International Amphitheatre

Champions

Singles
- (United States) Martina Navratilova

Doubles
- (Netherlands) Betty Stöve (Australia) Evonne Goolagong Cawley
- Virginia Slims of Chicago

The 1978 Virginia Slims of Chicago was a women's tennis tournament played on indoor carpet courts at the International Amphitheatre in Chicago, Illinois in the United States that was part of the 1978 Virginia Slims World Championship Series. It was the seventh edition of the tournament and was held from January 30 through February 5, 1978. First-seeded Martina Navratilova won the singles title and earned $20,000 first-prize money.

== Finals ==
=== Singles ===
(United States) Martina Navratilova defeated (Australia) Evonne Goolagong Cawley 6–7^{(4–5)}, 6–2, 6–2

- It was Navratilova's 4th singles title of the year and the 17th of her career.

=== Doubles ===
(Netherlands) Betty Stöve / (Australia) Evonne Goolagong Cawley defeated (United States) Rosie Casals / (United States) JoAnne Russell 6–1, 6–4

== Prize money ==
Event	W	F	3rd	4th	QF	Round of 16	Round of 32
Singles	$20,000	$10,500	$6,300	$5,500	$2,800	$1,550	$850
