= 1978 U.S. Clay Court Championships – Men's doubles =

Men's doubles
- 1978 U.S. Clay Court Championships

Final
- Champions: (United States) Gene Mayer (United States) Hank Pfister
- Runners-up: (United States) Jeff Borowiak (New Zealand) Chris Lewis
- Score: 6–4, 7–6

Events
Singles	men	women
Doubles	men	women
← 1977 ·	U.S. Clay Court Championships	· 1979 →

Jaime Fillol and Patricio Cornejo, the defending champions, returned with new partners. The pairs met in the quarterfinals with Cornejo and Pat DuPré claiming victory but Gene Mayer and Hank Pfister ended their run in the semifinal. Top-seeded Mayer and Pfister went on to win the title, beating Jeff Borowiak and Chris Lewis in the final.

== Seeds ==
A champion seed is indicated in bold text while text in italics indicates the round in which that seed was eliminated.

1. (United States) **Gene Mayer / (United States) Hank Pfister (champions)**
2. (United States) John McEnroe / (Hungary) Balázs Taróczy (semifinals)
3. (Chile) Álvaro Fillol / (Chile) Jaime Fillol (quarterfinals)
4. (Spain) José Higueras / (Spain) Manuel Orantes (second round)
5. (Argentina) José Luis Clerc / (Chile) Belus Prajoux (first round)
6. (Chile) Patricio Cornejo / (United States) Pat DuPré (semifinals)
7. (France) François Jauffret / (France) Christophe Roger-Vasselin (first round)
8. (United States) Jeff Borowiak / (New Zealand) Chris Lewis (final)

== Draw ==
=== Key ===
- Q = Qualifier
- WC = Wild card
- LL = Lucky loser
- Alt = Alternate
- SE = Special exempt
- PR = Protected ranking
- ITF = ITF entry
- JE = Junior exempt
- w/o = Walkover
- r = Retired
- d = Defaulted
- SR = Special ranking

=== Finals ===
Semifinals
1	**(United States) Gene Mayer** **(United States) Hank Pfister**	**7**	**7**
6	(Chile) Patricio Cornejo (United States) Pat DuPré	5	6
8	**(United States) Jeff Borowiak** **(New Zealand) Chris Lewis**	**7**	4	**7**
2	(United States) John McEnroe (Hungary) Balázs Taróczy	6	**6**	5

Final
1	**(United States) Gene Mayer** **(United States) Hank Pfister**	**6**	**6**
8	(United States) Jeff Borowiak (New Zealand) Chris Lewis	3	1

=== Top half ===
First round
1	**(United States) G Mayer** **(United States) H Pfister**	**6**	**6**
(United States) George Carlsson (United States) S Stewart	0	3
(Italy) R Lombardi (United States) H Schoenfield	2	3
**(Australia) D Carter** **(Australia) R Frawley**	**6**	**6**
(Italy) P Bertolucci (Italy) A Panatta	1	6
**(United States) M Fishbach** **(South Africa) B Mitton**	**6**	**7**
**(United States) M Davis** **(United States) S Denton**	**6**	3	**6**
7	(France) F Jauffret (France) C Roger-Vasselin	2	**6**	3
3	**(Chile) Á Fillol** **(Chile) J Fillol**	**6**	**6**
(United States) B Coleman (United States) G Holroyd	2	4
**(United States) B Nichols** **(United States) Chip Tolleson**	**7**	**6**
(Italy) G Ocleppo (Chile) P Rodríguez	6	4
(Colombia) Á Betancur (United States) B Rowe	**7**	3	4
**(United Kingdom) D Lloyd** **(United Kingdom) J Lloyd**	6	**6**	**6**
(Austria) P Feigl (Sweden) T Svensson	**6**	4	4
6	**(Chile) P Cornejo** **(United States) P DuPré**	4	**6**	**6**

Second round
1	**(United States) G Mayer** **(United States) H Pfister**	**6**	**6**
(Australia) D Carter (Australia) R Frawley	3	4
**(United States) M Fishbach** **(South Africa) B Mitton**	**6**	**6**
(United States) M Davis (United States) S Denton	0	1
3	**(Chile) Á Fillol** **(Chile) J Fillol**	**6**	**6**
(United States) B Nichols (United States) C Tolleson	4	4
(United Kingdom) D Lloyd (United Kingdom) J Lloyd	3	4
6	**(Chile) P Cornejo** **(United States) P DuPré**	**6**	**6**

Quarterfinals
1	**(United States) G Mayer** **(United States) H Pfister**	**6**	**6**
(United States) M Fishbach (South Africa) B Mitton	1	2
3	(Chile) Á Fillol (Chile) J Fillol	**6**	2	3
6	**(Chile) P Cornejo** **(United States) P DuPré**	4	**6**	**6**

Semifinals
1	**(United States) G Mayer** **(United States) H Pfister**	**7**	**7**
6	(Chile) P Cornejo (United States) P DuPré	5	6

=== Bottom half ===
First round
8	**(United States) J Borowiak** **(New Zealand) C Lewis**	**6**	**6**
(United States) Earl Prince (United States) R Tyler	0	2
**(Australia) B Drewett** **(South Africa) J Kriek**	**6**	5	**6**
(Sweden) K Johansson (Israel) S Krulevitz	3	**7**	2
**(Australia) S Docherty** **(United States) G Hardie**	**6**	**6**
(United States) T Graham (United States) J Sadri	3	3
(France) G Moretton (France) P Portes	2	2
4	**(Spain) J Higueras** **(Spain) M Orantes**	**6**	**6**
5	(Argentina) JL Clerc (Chile) B Prajoux	**6**	3	0
**(France) É Deblicker** **(France) Y Noah**	4	**6**	**6**
**(Switzerland) C Dowdeswell** **(Switzerland) H Günthardt**	**6**	**6**
(United States) B Martin (United States) B Scanlon	4	2
(Italy) C Barazzutti (Austria) H Kary	2	2
**(Socialist Federal Republic of Yugoslavia) Ž Franulović** **(Chile) H Gildemeister**	**6**	**6**
(Australia) D Crealy (Egypt) I El Shafei	4	4
2	**(United States) J McEnroe** **(Hungary) B Taróczy**	**6**	**6**

Second round
8	**(United States) J Borowiak** **(New Zealand) C Lewis**	**6**	**6**
(Australia) B Drewett (South Africa) J Kriek	2	4
**(Australia) S Docherty** **(United States) G Hardie**	w/o
4	(Spain) J Higueras (Spain) M Orantes
**(France) É Deblicker** **(France) Y Noah**	4	**6**	**6**
(Switzerland) C Dowdeswell (Switzerland) H Günthardt	**6**	0	3
(Socialist Federal Republic of Yugoslavia) Ž Franulović (Chile) H Gildemeister	3	4
2	**(United States) J McEnroe** **(Hungary) B Taróczy**	**6**	**6**

Quarterfinals
8	**(United States) J Borowiak** **(New Zealand) C Lewis**	5	**6**	**6**
(Australia) S Docherty (United States) G Hardie	**7**	4	2
(France) É Deblicker (France) Y Noah	1	5
2	**(United States) J McEnroe** **(Hungary) B Taróczy**	**6**	**7**

Semifinals
8	**(United States) J Borowiak** **(New Zealand) C Lewis**	**7**	4	**7**
2	(United States) J McEnroe (Hungary) B Taróczy	6	**6**	5
