= U.S. Women's Clay Court Championships =

Defunct tennis tournament
- Event name: U.S. Open Clay Courts
- Tour: Grand Prix (1971–1972); WTA Tour (1973–1986)
- Founded: 1912
- Abolished: 1986
- Editions: 55
- Location: Various; United States
- Surface: Clay

The U.S. Open Clay Courts, known formally as the U.S. Clay Court Championships, was a national tennis championship for women that was sanctioned by the United States Tennis Association. The first edition was held in Pittsburgh, Pennsylvania in 1912, two years after the first men's championships, and was won by May Sutton. The final edition was held in 1986 and won by Steffi Graf. The tournament was not held in 1913, 1924–1939 and 1942. The doubles event was first held in 1914.

Nancy Richey and Chris Evert won more singles titles (6) at this tournament than any other woman. Linda Tuero holds the record for runners-up in singles (3).

== Locations ==
- 1912: Pittsburgh, Pennsylvania
- 1913: Not held
- 1914: Cincinnati, Ohio (Cincinnati Tennis Club)
- 1915: Pittsburgh, Pennsylvania (Pittsburgh Athletic Association)
- 1916: Cleveland, Ohio (Lakewood Tennis Club)
- 1917: Cincinnati, Ohio (Cincinnati Tennis Club)
- 1918–19: Chicago, Illinois (South Side Tennis Club)
- 1920: Detroit, Michigan (Detroit Tennis Club)
- 1921–23: Buffalo, New York (Park Club)
- 1924–39: Not held
- 1940–41: River Forest, Illinois (River Forest Tennis Club)
- 1942: Not held
- 1943–44: Detroit, Michigan (Detroit Tennis Club)
- 1947: Salt Lake City, Utah (Salt Lake Tennis Club)
- 1948–54: River Forest, Illinois (River Forest Tennis Club)
- 1955: Atlanta, Georgia (Bryan M. Grant, Jr. Tennis Center)
- 1956–65: River Forest, Illinois (River Forest Tennis Club)
- 1966–68: Milwaukee, Wisconsin (Town Club)
- 1969–86: Indianapolis, Indiana (Indianapolis Racquet Club)

== Finals ==
=== Singles ===
Year	Champions	Runners-up	Score
1912	(United States) May Sutton	(United States) Mary Browne	6–4, 6–2
1913	Not held		
1914	(United States) Mary Browne	(United States) Louise Riddell Williams	6–1, 3–6, 6–2
1915	(Norway) Molla Bjurstedt	(United States) Hazel Hotchkiss Wightman	3–6, 6–1, 6–3
1916	(Norway) Molla Bjurstedt	(United States) Martha Guthrie	8–6, 6–3
1917	(United States) Ruth Sanders	(United States) W. E. Ellis	6–1, 6–3
1918	(United States) Carrie Neely	(United States) Adelaide Yager	6–4, 6–2
1919	(United States) Corinne Gould	(United States) Carrie Neely	6–4, 6–2
1920	(United States) Marion Zinderstein	(United States) Corinne Gould	6–0, 6–1
1921	(United States) Ann Sheafe Cole	(United States) Anna Godfrey	6–0, 6–3
1922	(Canada) Lois Moyes Bickle	(United States) Leslie Bancroft	3–6, 6–1, 7–5
1923	(United States) Mayme McDonald	(United States) Lilian Scharman	7–5, 1–6, 6–4
1924 – 1939	Not held		
1940	(United States) Alice Marble	(United States) Gracyn Wheeler	7–5, 6–0
1941	(United States) Pauline Betz	(United States) Mary Arnold	6–3, 6–1
1942	Not held		
1943	(United States) Pauline Betz	(United States) Nancy Corbett	6–1, 6–0
1944	(United States) Dorothy Bundy	(United States) Mary Arnold	7–5, 6–4
1945	(United States) Sarah Palfrey Cooke	(United States) Pauline Betz	6–3, 7–5
1946	(United States) Barbara Krase	(United States) Virginia Kovacs	10–8, 6–4
1947	(United States) Mary Arnold Prentiss	(United States) Dorothy Head	6–1, 6–1
1948	(Romania) Magda Rurac	(United States) Dorothy Head	6–2, 6–0
1949	(Romania) Magda Rurac	(United States) Beverly Baker	2–6, 9–7, 6–3
1950	(United States) Doris Hart	(United States) Shirley Fry	6–1, 6–3
1951	(United States) Dorothy Head	(United States) Patricia Canning Todd	4–6, 6–2, 6–2
1952	(United States) Anita Kanter	(United States) Lucille Davidson	6–4, 6–3
1953	(United States) Maureen Connolly	(United States) Althea Gibson	6–4, 6–4
1954	(United States) Maureen Connolly	(United States) Doris Hart	6–3, 6–1
1955	(United States) Dorothy Head Knode	(United States) Barbara Breit	6–4, 6–3
1956	(United States) Shirley Fry	(United States) Althea Gibson	7–5, 6–1
1957	(United States) Althea Gibson	(United States) Darlene Hard	6–2, 6–3
1958	(United States) Dorothy Head Knode	(United States) Karol Fageros	6–3, 6–8, 6–2
1959	(United States) Sally Moore	(South Africa) Sandra Reynolds	6–2, 2–6, 6–3
1960	(United States) Dorothy Head Knode	(United States) Gwyneth Thomas	6–3, 6–4
1961	(West Germany) Edda Buding	(United States) Karen Hantze	6–4, 2–6, 6–4
1962	(United States) Donna Floyd	(United States) Carole Caldwell	6–3, 6–1
1963	(United States) Nancy Richey	(United States) Victoria Palmer	6–1, 6–1
1964	(United States) Nancy Richey	(United States) Carole Caldwell Graebner	6–2, 6–1
1965	(United States) Nancy Richey	(United States) Julie Heldman	5–7, 6–3, 9–7
1966	(United States) Nancy Richey	(United States) Stephanie DeFina	6–2, 6–2
1967	(United States) Nancy Richey	(United States) Rosemary Casals	6–2, 6–3
1968	(United States) Nancy Richey	(United States) Linda Tuero	6–3, 6–3
1969	(France) Gail Chanfreau	(United States) Linda Tuero	6–2, 6–2
1970	(United States) Linda Tuero	(France) Gail Chanfreau	7–5, 6–1
1971	(United States) Billie Jean King	(United States) Linda Tuero	6–4, 7–5
1972	(United States) Chris Evert	(Australia) Evonne Goolagong	7–6^{(5–2)}, 6–1
1973	(United States) Chris Evert	(United Kingdom) Veronica Burton	6–4, 6–3
1974	(United States) Chris Evert	(France) Gail Chanfreau	6–0, 6–0
1975	(United States) Chris Evert	(Australia) Dianne Fromholtz	6–3, 6–4
1976	(United States) Kathy May	(South Africa) Brigitte Cuypers	6–4, 4–6, 6–2
1977	(United States) Laura DuPont	(United States) Nancy Richey	6–4, 6–3
1978	(United States) Dana Gilbert	(Argentina) Viviana González	6–2, 6–3
1979	(United States) Chris Evert	(Australia) Evonne Goolagong Cawley	6–4, 6–3
1980	(United States) Chris Evert	(United States) Andrea Jaeger	6–4, 6–3
1981	(United States) Andrea Jaeger	(Romania) Virginia Ruzici	6–1, 6–0
1982	(Romania) Virginia Ruzici	(Czechoslovakia) Helena Suková	6–2, 6–0
1983	(Hungary) Andrea Temesvári	(United States) Zina Garrison	6–2, 6–2
1984	(Bulgaria) Manuela Maleeva	(United States) Lisa Bonder	6–4, 6–3
1985	(Hungary) Andrea Temesvári	(United States) Zina Garrison	7–6, 6–3
1986	(West Germany) Steffi Graf	(Argentina) Gabriela Sabatini	2–6, 7–6, 6–4

=== Doubles ===
Year	Champions	Runners-up	Score
1944	(United States) Pauline Betz (United States) Doris Hart		
1945	(United States) Pauline Betz (United States) Doris Hart		
1946	(United States) Shirley Fry (United States) Mary Arnold Prentiss	(United States) Virginia Kovacs (United States) Barbara Scofield	6–4, 6–1
1947	(United States) Gussie Moran (United States) Mary Arnold Prentiss	(United States) Shirley Fry (United States) Barbara Krase	6–4, 6–4
1948	Not held		
1949	Not held		
1950	(United States) Shirley Fry (United States) Doris Hart	(United States) Beverly Baker (Romania) Magda Rurac	2–6, 6–4, 6–4
1951	(Romania) Magda Rurac (United States) Patricia Canning Todd	(United States) Dorothy Head (United States) Anita Kanter	
1952	(United States) Lucille Davidson (United States) Doris Popple	(United States) Anita Kanter (United States) Joan Merciadas	7–5, 6–4
1953	(United States) Anita Kanter (Australia) Thelma Coyne Long	(United States) Maureen Connolly (United States) Julia Sampson	6–3, 6–0
1954	(United States) Maureen Connolly (United States) Doris Hart	(United States) Althea Gibson (United States) Ethel Norton	6–3, 6–2
1955	(United States) Dorothy Head Knode (United States) Janet Hopps	(United States) Pat Shaffer (United States) Barbara Breit	6–2, 3–6, 6–3
1956	(United States) Shirley Fry (United States) Dorothy Head Knode	(Mexico) Martha Hernández (Mexico) Yola Ramírez	6–2, 6–2
1957	(United States) Althea Gibson (United States) Darlene Hard	(United States) Karol Fageros (United States) Jeanne Arth	6–3, 6–0
1958	(United States) Karol Fageros (United States) Dorothy Head Knode		
1959	(South Africa) Sandra Reynolds (South Africa) Renée Schuurman	(United States) Jeanne Arth (United States) Janet Hopps	
1960	(United States) Darlene Hard (United States) Billie Jean Moffitt	(United States) Justina Bricka (United States) Carol Hanks	6–3, 6–4
1961	(United States) Justina Bricka (United States) Carol Hanks		
1962	(United States) Darlene Hard (United States) Susan Behlmar		
1963	(Brazil) Maria Bueno (United States) Darlene Hard		
1964	(United States) Carole Graebner (United States) Nancy Richey		
1965	(United States) Carole Graebner (United States) Nancy Richey		
1966	(Australia) Karen Krantzcke (Australia) Kerry Melville	(South Africa) Esmé Emmanuel (South Africa) Maryna Godwin	1–6, 6–4, 6–4
1967	(Australia) Karen Krantzcke (Australia) Kerry Melville		
1968	(United States) Nancy Richey (United States) Valerie Ziegenfuss		
1969	(Australia) Lesley Turner Bowrey (France) Gail Chanfreau	(United States) Emilie Burrer (United States) Linda Tuero	6–0, 10–8
1970	(United States) Rosemary Casals (France) Gail Chanfreau	(Australia) Helen Gourlay (South Africa) Patricia Walkden	6–2, 6–2
1971	(Australia) Judy Tegart Dalton (United States) Billie Jean King	(United States) Julie Heldman (United States) Linda Tuero	6–1, 6–2
1972	(Australia) Evonne Goolagong (Australia) Lesley Hunt	(Australia) Margaret Smith Court (United States) Pam Teeguarden	6–2, 6–1
1973	(United States) Patti Hogan (United States) Sharon Walsh	(Uruguay) Fiorella Bonicelli (Colombia) María-Isabel Fernández	6–4, 6–4
1974	(France) Gail Chanfreau (United States) Julie Heldman	(United States) Chris Evert (United States) Jeanne Evert	6–3, 6–1
1975	(Uruguay) Fiorella Bonicelli (Colombia) María-Isabel Fernández	(France) Gail Chanfreau (United States) Julie Heldman	3–6, 7–5, 6–3
1976	(South Africa) Linky Boshoff (South Africa) Ilana Kloss	(United States) Laura DuPont (Australia) Wendy Turnbull	6–2, 6–3
1977	(South Africa) Linky Boshoff (South Africa) Ilana Kloss	(United States) Mary Carillo (United States) Wendy Overton	5–7, 7–5, 6–3
1978	(Sweden) Helena Anliot (Denmark) Helle Sparre-Viragh	(United States) Barbara Hallquist (United States) Sheila McInerney	6–3, 6–1
1979	(United States) Kathy Jordan (United States) Anne Smith	(United States) Penny Johnson (United States) Paula Smith	6–1, 6–0
1980	(United States) Anne Smith (United States) Paula Smith	(Romania) Virginia Ruzici (Czechoslovakia) Renáta Tomanová	6–4, 3–6, 6–4
1981	(United States) JoAnne Russell (Romania) Virginia Ruzici	(United Kingdom) Sue Barker (United States) Paula Smith	6–2, 6–2
1982	(Argentina) Ivanna Madruga (France) Catherine Tanvier	(United States) JoAnne Russell (Romania) Virginia Ruzici	7–5, 7–6
1983	(United States) Kathleen Horvath (Romania) Virginia Ruzici	(United States) Gigi Fernández (United States) Beth Herr	4–6, 7–6, 6–2
1984	(South Africa) Beverly Mould (United States) Paula Smith	(United States) Elise Burgin (United States) JoAnne Russell	6–2, 7–5
1985	(Bulgaria) Katerina Maleeva (Bulgaria) Manuela Maleeva	(United States) Penny Barg (United States) Paula Smith	3–6, 6–3, 6–4
1986	(West Germany) Steffi Graf (Argentina) Gabriela Sabatini	(United States) Gigi Fernández (United States) Robin White	6–2, 6–0

== See also ==
- U.S. Men's Clay Court Championships
- U.S. Women's Indoor Championships
