= Helle Sparre =

Danish tennis player

- Full name: Helle Sparre-Viragh
- Country (sports): Denmark
- Born: 30 June 1956 (age 68); Copenhagen, Denmark

Singles
- Career record: -

Grand Slam singles results
- French Open: 2R (1978)
- Wimbledon: 3R (1977, 1978)
- US Open: 1R (1974, 1977, 1978)

Doubles
- Career record: -
- Career titles: 1 WTA

Grand Slam doubles results
- French Open: 1R (1978)
- Wimbledon: 3R (1978)
- US Open: 2R (1974, 1978)

Team competitions
- Fed Cup: 10–10

Helle Sparre (born 30 June 1956) is a former professional tennis player from Denmark. She competed during her career under her married name Helle Sparre-Viragh.

== Biography ==
Born in Copenhagen, Sparre featured in 13 Federation Cup ties for Denmark in the 1970s, including a quarter-final in 1976. She twice reached the third round of the Wimbledon Championships, in 1977 and 1978. Partnering Helena Anliot, she won the doubles title at the 1978 U.S. Clay Court Championships.

Sparre lived in California beginning in 1978 and served as the tennis director and head pro at Scott Valley Swimming and Tennis Club in Mill Valley, CA from 1987-2015 . She is the author of Dynamite Doubles, an instructional book for doubles tennis strategy.

Helle currently lives in Mesa, Arizona, and she coaches and plays pickleball at the senior pro level.

- In August 2016, she played in her first ever pickleball tournament and won Gold in women’s doubles
- 2016 National Champion 5.0 singles age 60s
- 2017 US Open Bronze Medal in senior pro mixed doubles
- 2017 IPTPA certified teaching pro
- 2017 SO CAL PPF (Professional Pickleball Federation, silver medal, women’s doubles senior pro
- 2017 Golden State championships, winner women’s doubles and winner mixed doubles
- 2017 Bend Oregon Professional Pickleball Federation (PPF), bronze women’s senior pro and 4th mixed senior pro
- 2018 Grand Canyon Games, gold medal in senior 5.0 and 50+ mixed doubles with Larry Moon, bronze with Kim Jagd in women’s 5.0 and 50+
- 2018 Duel in the Desert, gold medal in both women’s doubles (jasna) 5.0 50+ and mixed doubles 5.0 and 50+ with Larry Moon
- 2018 US Open, gold mixed 60 with Larry Moon, gold women’s 60 with Mona Burnett, bronze women’s senior pro with Joanne Russell
- 2018 Centralia world indoor championships, winner mixed senior pro and women’s senior pro, silver women’s

== WTA career finals ==
=== Doubles: 1 title ===
Result	Date	Tournament	Tier	Surface	Partner	Opponents	Score
Win	Aug 1978	U.S. Clay Courts	Colgate Series (A)	Clay	(Sweden) Helena Anliot	(United States) Barbara Hallquist (United States) Sheila McInerney	6–1, 6–3
