= Viviana González =

Argentine tennis player

- Full name: Viviana González Locicero
- Country (sports): Argentina
- Born: 22 April 1958 (age 67); Rosario, Argentina
- Plays: Right-handed

Singles

Grand Slam singles results
- French Open: 3R (1978)
- Wimbledon: 2R (1978, 1979)
- US Open: 2R (1978)

Doubles

Grand Slam doubles results
- French Open: QF (1978)
- Wimbledon: 1R (1978)

Viviana Marina González Locicero (Note: In this Spanish name, the first or paternal surname is González and the second or maternal family name is Locicero.) (born 22 April 1958) is an Argentine former professional tennis player. She is also known by her married name Viviana Segal.

== Biography ==
A right-handed player from Rosario, González is the granddaughter of Felipe Locicero, who was a coach of Guillermo Vilas.

González was Argentina's top ranked female player in the late 1970s and represented her country in a total of eight Federation Cup ties.

She was runner-up at the 1978 U.S. Clay Court Championships, with her run including a win over number one seed Mima Jaušovec.

Her best grand slam performance came at the 1978 French Open, where she upset fourth seed Nancy Richey en route to the round of 16 and was a doubles quarter-finalist, partnering Ivanna Madruga.

== WTA Tour finals ==
=== Singles (0-1) ===
Result	Date	Tournament	Tier	Surface	Opponent	Score
Loss	August, 1978	Indianapolis, United States	Series (A)	Clay	(United States) Dana Gilbert	2–6, 3–6

== See also ==
- List of Argentina Fed Cup team representatives
