= Sheila McInerney =

American tennis player

- Country (sports): United States
- Born: February 22, 1958 (age 67)

Singles

Grand Slam singles results
- Wimbledon: 1R (1978)
- US Open: 3R (1977)

Doubles

Grand Slam doubles results
- French Open: 2R (1982)
- Wimbledon: 2R (1981, 1983)
- US Open: 3R (1978, 1982)

Sheila McInerney (born February 22, 1958) is an American former professional tennis player.

== Biography ==
McInerney is originally from Rome, New York and began playing tennis at the age of eight. A former student at the Rome Free Academy, she later moved to Miami to further her tennis and attended Palmetto High School. She received a tennis scholarship to the University of Southern California (USC Trojans) in 1976.

As an amateur, McInerney qualified for the main draw of the 1977 US Open and made it through to the third round, where she was beaten in three sets by Billie Jean King. In 1978 she partnered with USC teammate Barbara Hallquist to a runner-up finish in the doubles at the U.S. Clay Court Championships.

By the time she graduated from USC in 1980, she had achieved four All-American selections and was captain of the Trojans in her senior year. From 1980 to 1983, McInerney competed professionally and featured in the doubles main draws of the French Open and Wimbledon.

Now a tennis coach, McInerney led the American women's teams at the 1986 Goodwill Games and 1987 Pan American Games. Since 1985, she has been the long serving head coach of Arizona State Sun Devils women's tennis.

== WTA career finals ==
=== Doubles: 1 runner-up ===
Outcome	Date	Tournament	Surface	Partner	Opponents	Score
Loss	Aug 1978	U.S. Clay Courts	Clay	(United States) Barbara Hallquist	(Sweden) Helena Anliot (Denmark) Helle Sparre-Viragh	1–6, 3–6
