= Jeanne Evert =

American tennis player (1957–2020)

- Full name: Jeanne Colette Evert Dubin
- Country (sports): United States
- Born: October 5, 1957 Fort Lauderdale, Florida
- Died: February 20, 2020 (aged 62) Delray Beach, Florida
- Height: 5 ft 1 in (1.55 m)
- Turned pro: 1973

Singles
- Highest ranking: No. 28

Grand Slam singles results
- French Open: 2R (1978)
- Wimbledon: 2R (1976)
- US Open: 3R (1973, 1978)

Doubles

Grand Slam doubles results
- French Open: 2R (1975)
- Wimbledon: 2R (1974)
- US Open: 2R (1972, 1976)

Jeanne Colette Dubin (née Evert; October 5, 1957 – February 20, 2020) was an American professional tennis player and the younger sister of Chris Evert. She was ranked as high as 28th by the WTA in 1978 and ninth within the United States in 1974. She reached the third round of the U.S. Open in 1973 and 1978. She won all four of her Fed Cup matches for the U.S. in 1974.

Evert made her professional debut at age 15 in 1973 at the Cincinnati Open. She reached the singles semifinals, losing to Evonne Goolagong, and she is still the youngest player to reach the semifinals in Cincinnati in the Open Era. She also paired with her sister Chris to reach the semifinals in doubles, losing to Goolagong and Janet Young.

Evert retired in 1978, and in later years, was a coach at the Delray Beach Tennis Center. Evert died on February 20, 2020, from ovarian cancer. She was 62.

== Grand Slam tournament performance timeline ==
Key
W	F	SF	QF	#R	RR	Q#	DNQ	A	NH

(W) winner; (F) finalist; (SF) semifinalist; (QF) quarterfinalist; (#R) rounds 4, 3, 2, 1; (RR) round-robin stage; (Q#) qualification round; (DNQ) did not qualify; (A) absent; (NH) not held; (SR) strike rate (events won / competed); (W–L) win–loss record.

Tournament	1972	1973	1974	1975	1976	1977	1978
Australian Open	A	A	A	A	A	A	A
French Open	A	A	A	1R	A	A	2R
Wimbledon	A	A	1R	A	2R	A	A
US Open	1R	3R	1R	2R	2R	2R	3R
Year-end WTA ranking				42	49	47	70

- The French Open had a main draw of 64 during these years, and the U.S. Open had a main draw of 64 until 1976.
