= Diane Desfor =

American tennis player

- Full name: Diane Desfor Stalder
- Country (sports): United States
- Born: June 15, 1955 (age 71) Long Beach, California, U.S.
- Height: 5 ft 5 in (1.65 m)
- Plays: Right-handed

Singles
- Highest ranking: No. 32

Grand Slam singles results
- Australian Open: 2R (1980, 1981)
- French Open: 2R (1978, 1981)
- Wimbledon: 3R (1979)
- US Open: 2R (1978, 1982)

Grand Slam doubles results
- Australian Open: 1R (1980, 1981)
- French Open: 2R (1979, 1981)
- Wimbledon: 3R (1979)
- US Open: QF (1979, 1980)

Grand Slam mixed doubles results
- Wimbledon: 3R (1981)
- US Open: 2R (1978)

Diane Desfor (born June 15, 1955), is an American former tennis player who was active in the late 1970s and early 1980s.

Her best result at a Grand Slam singles event was reaching the third round at the 1981 Wimbledon Championships where she lost in straight sets to seventh-seeded Billie Jean King. At the three other Majors she reached the second round in singles. In doubles, with partner Barbara Hallquist, she reached the quarterfinals of the US Open in 1979 and 1980.

In December 1979, she won the doubles title at the New South Wales Open with Barbara Hallquist. In June 1981, she reached the semifinals of the singles event at Surbiton, which she lost to Hallquist in three sets.

Desfor won the WTA Player Service Award in 1980 and 1982.

She attended the University of Southern California and graduated Phi Beta Kappa in 1977 with a degree in psychology. After her tennis career, Desfor became a lawyer, specializing in employment law. She is married to Curt Stalder, and the couple have two children.

== WTA Tour finals ==
=== Doubles (1 title) ===
Outcome	No.	Date	Tournament	Surface	Partner	Opponents	Score
Winner	1.	December 17, 1979	Sydney, Australia	Grass	(United States) Barbara Hallquist	(United States) Barbara Jordan (Australia) Kym Ruddell	4–6, 6–2, 6–2
