= Jeanne DuVall =

American tennis player

- Country (sports): United States
- Born: December 7, 1959 (age 66)
- College: UCLA

Singles

Grand Slam singles results
- French Open: 2R (1979, 1980, 1981)
- Wimbledon: 2R (1978)
- US Open: 4R (1979)

Doubles

Grand Slam doubles results
- French Open: 2R (1980)
- Wimbledon: 2R (1980)
- US Open: 2R (1978, 1979)

Jeanne DuVall (born December 7, 1959) is an American former professional tennis player.

== Biography ==
A right-handed player from Dallas, DuVall was a Texas 18 and under state champion. She played college tennis for the UCLA Bruins and in 1978 won the AIAW singles championship (over Kathy Jordan), which earned her a Honda Award.

DuVall had her breakthrough performance on the WTA at Hilton Head in 1978 when she upset Wendy Turnbull en route to the quarterfinals. At the 1979 US Open she beat Bettina Bunge, Nancy Yeargin and Julie Harrington to make the fourth round, where she lost in three sets to Evonne Goolagong. She won a Fort Myers Avon Futures tournament in 1980 and was a two-time quarterfinalist at the U.S. Clay Court Championships.
