= Caroline Stoll =

American tennis player

- Country (sports): United States
- Born: November 4, 1960 (age 64); Morristown, New Jersey, U.S.
- Turned pro: 1977
- Retired: 1981
- Plays: Right-handed (two-handed backhand)

Singles
- Career titles: 5
- Highest ranking: No. 15 (1979)

Grand Slam singles results
- French Open: 2R (1980)
- Wimbledon: 2R (1978)
- US Open: 3R (1978, 1979)

Caroline Stoll (born November 4, 1960) is an American retired professional tennis player.

== Career ==
Stoll won the 1976 Easter Bowl Girls' 16s Championships and the 1977 Easter Bowl Girls' 18s Championships as a junior. She turned professional in 1977 at the age of 16. She had career wins over Wendy Turnbull, Virginia Ruzici, Dianne Fromholtz, and Regina Maršíková. Stoll won five singles titles and reached a career-high ranking of world No. 15 in 1979. She retired in 1981.

== WTA Tour finals ==
=== Singles: 7 (5–2) ===
Winner — Legend Grand Slam tournaments (0–0) WTA Tour Championships (0–0) Virginia Slims, Avon, Other (5–2)	Titles by surface Hard (2–0) Grass (0–0) Clay (3–1) Carpet (0–1)

Result	W/L	Date	Tournament	Surface	Opponent	Score
Loss	0–1	Apr 1977	Port Washington, U.S.	Carpet	(United States) Billie Jean King	6–1, 6–1
Win	1–1	Jan 1978	Ogden, U.S.	Hard (i)	(United States) Carrie Meyer	6–3, 6–4
Win	2–1	Feb 1978	Fort Lauderdale, U.S.	Clay	(Australia) Lesley Hunt	6–3, 6–2
Win	3–1	Sep 1978	Montreal, Canada	Hard (i)	(France) Françoise Dürr	6–3, 6–2
Win	4–1	Oct 1978	Buenos Aires, Argentina	Clay	(Argentina) Emilse Raponi	6–3, 6–2
Loss	4–2	May 1979	Vienna, Austria	Clay	(United States) Chris Evert	6–1, 6–1
Win	5–2	May 1979	Berlin, West Germany	Clay	(Czechoslovakia) Regina Maršíková	7–6^{(7–4)}, 6–0

== Grand Slam singles tournament timeline ==
Key
W	F	SF	QF	#R	RR	Q#	DNQ	A	NH

(W) winner; (F) finalist; (SF) semifinalist; (QF) quarterfinalist; (#R) rounds 4, 3, 2, 1; (RR) round-robin stage; (Q#) qualification round; (DNQ) did not qualify; (A) absent; (NH) not held; (SR) strike rate (events won / competed); (W–L) win–loss record.

Tournament	1976	1977		1978	1979	1980	1981	Career SR
Australian Open	A	A	A	A	A	A	A	0 / 0
French Open	A	A		1R	1R	2R	A	0 / 3
Wimbledon	A	A		2R	A	A	A	0 / 1
US Open	A	1R		3R	3R	1R	A	0 / 4
SR	0 / 0	0 / 1		0 / 3	0 / 2	0 / 2	0 / 0	0 / 8
Year End Ranking	NR	60		26	18	43	NR	

- Note: The Australian Open was held twice in 1977, in January and December.
