= Zenda Liess =

American tennis player (born 1959)

- Full name: Zenda Liess
- Country (sports): United States
- Born: December 12, 1959 (age 66)

Grand Slam singles results
- French Open: 1R (1979)
- US Open: QF (1976)

Grand Slam doubles results
- US Open: 1R (1976, 1978)

Zenda Liess (born December 12, 1959) is a former professional tennis player from the United States.

== Biography ==
=== Tennis career ===
Liess competed as a junior in Florida, where she attended Spruce Creek High School. She won back to back Orange Bowl titles for the 16s and Under in 1973 and 1974.

As a 16-year old she was a quarter-finalist at the 1976 US Open, one of few occasions the tournament had been played on clay, a surface Liess was strong on.

In 1977 she won the state championships while at Spruce Creek, then upon graduating played on the professional circuit for three years.

She made the US Open third round in both 1977 and 1978, but could not repeat her earlier success.

On the WTA Tour her best performance was a semi-final appearance at the 1978 Rothmans Canadian Open.

=== Later life ===
Liess ran a hotdog stand with first husband Byron on Daytona Beach for 10 years.

With a master's degree in accounting from the University of Florida, Liess eventually settled in Greensboro, North Carolina, where she still lives.

Only working as an accountant for a short period of time, she instead became a pilot with Atlantic Southeast Airlines. In 1998 she became a designated pilot examiner. Her second husband, Pat, was once her flight instructor.
