= Dana Gilbert =

American tennis player

- Full name: Dana Gilbert Heinemann
- Country (sports): United States
- Born: November 26, 1959 (age 65)

Singles
- Career titles: 2
- Highest ranking: No. 46 (January 17, 1983)

Grand Slam singles results
- French Open: 4R (1982)
- Wimbledon: 1R (1979, 1980)
- US Open: 3R (1982)

Doubles
- Career titles: 1

Grand Slam doubles results
- French Open: 2R (1980, 1981)
- Wimbledon: 2R (1979)
- US Open: 1R (1978, 1979, 1981, 1982, 1983)
Medal record
Maccabiah Games
Gold medal – first place	1977 Israel	Women's singles
Gold medal – first place	1981 Israel	Women's doubles

Dana Gilbert (born November 26, 1959) is an American former professional tennis player.

== Biography ==
Gilbert was raised in California, one of three siblings. Her youngest brother is Brad Gilbert, who also played tennis professionally, and made it to four in the world.

She attended Piedmont High School, and then UCLA on a tennis scholarship and played number one singles.

At the age of 17 she won a gold medal at the 1977 Maccabiah Games in Israel, a competition for Israeli and Jewish athletes, defeating Stacy Margolin, the number 8 under-18 player in the U.S. At the 1981 Maccabiah Games, she and Donna Rubin won a gold medal in the women's doubles.

Playing as a wildcard, she was a surprise winner of the 1978 U.S. Clay Court Championships, on her professional debut. En route to the final, which she won over Viviana González, she had a win against second seed Virginia Ruzici, who two-months earlier had won the French Open. In October, 1980 she won her second WTA singles title at Nagoya and also won the Japan Open doubles title in the same month. She made the fourth round of the 1982 French Open as a lucky loser. In early 1983 she was ranked a career best 46 in the world, before retiring from professional tennis at the end of the year.

She now lives in San Anselmo, California and is married to Geoffrey Heinemann.

In 1994 she was inducted into the Southern California Jewish Sports Hall of Fame.

== WTA Tour finals ==
=== Singles (2-0) ===
Result	Date	Tournament	Tier	Surface	Opponent	Score
Win	Aug 1978	Indianapolis, U.S.	$35,000 (Colgate)	Clay	(Argentina) Viviana González	6–2, 6–3
Win	Oct 1980	Nagoya, Japan	$50,000 (Colgate)	Hard	(United States) Barbara Jordan	5–1 ret

=== Doubles (1-0) ===
Result	Date	Tournament	Tier	Surface	Partner	Opponents	Score
Win	Oct 1980	Tokyo, Japan	$50,000 (Colgate)	Hard	(United States) Mareen Louie	(Australia) Nerida Gregory (Hungary) Marie Pinterová	7–5, 7–6
