= Carrie Meyer =

American tennis player

- Full name: Carolyn Meyer Richardson
- Country (sports): United States
- Born: August 22, 1955 (age 70) Indianapolis, U.S.
- Plays: Right-handed

Singles
- Highest ranking: No. 14

Grand Slam singles results
- French Open: 1R (1977)
- Wimbledon: 3R (1978)
- US Open: 3R (1974)

Doubles

Grand Slam doubles results
- Wimbledon: 3R (1975, 1977)
- US Open: 3R (1976)

Grand Slam mixed doubles results
- Wimbledon: QF (1974)

Carolyn Meyer Richardson (born August 22, 1955) is an American former professional tennis player.

== Biography ==
From Indianapolis, Meyer was the Indiana state singles champion in 1971 at the age of 16. Before turning professional, she played tennis at Marymount College (now Lynn University) and in 1974 was the AIAW national singles champion.

Meyer, who reached a best world ranking of 14, began competing on the professional tour in 1974. In her first year on tour, she made the mixed doubles quarterfinals at Wimbledon (partnering Rayno Seegers), reached the third round of the US Open, and was a semifinalist at the U.S. Clay Court Championships. She made the biggest final of her professional career in 1975 at the Virginia Slims of Denver, where she was beaten in three sets by Martina Navratilova. During this tournament, she upset Janet Newberry, Laura Dupont, #7 seed Linky Boshoff, #2 Francoise Durr & No. 5 Nancy Richey.

From 1975 to 1976, she played World TeamTennis for Indiana Loves. In 1978, she reached the third round at Wimbledon and won the Scottish Championships singles title.

Retiring in the early 1980s, Meyer became coach of the women's tennis team at Purdue University, and in 1985, was in charge of the United States Junior Federation Cup team. She lives in Stanwood, Washington.

== WTA Tour finals ==
=== Singles (0-1) ===
Result	Date	Tournament	Surface	Opponent	Score
Loss	September 1975	Virginia Slims of Denver, United States	Hard	(Czechoslovakia) Martina Navratilova	6–4, 4–6, 3–6
