= Helena Anliot =

Swedish tennis player

- Country (sports): Sweden
- Born: 26 September 1956 (age 68); Falun, Sweden
- Height: 1.68 m (5 ft 6 in)
- Turned pro: 1973
- Retired: 1980
- Plays: Right-handed

Singles
- Career titles: 0 WTA, 8 ITF

Grand Slam singles results
- Australian Open: 2R (1975)
- French Open: 1R (1975, 1976, 1978)
- Wimbledon: 2R (1978, 1980)
- US Open: 3R (1977)

Doubles
- Career titles: 4 WTA, 5 ITF

Grand Slam doubles results
- Australian Open: 2R (1974)
- French Open: SF (1978)
- Wimbledon: 1R (1975, 1978, 1980)
- US Open: 1R (1977, 1978)

Helena Anliot (born 26 September 1956) is a Swedish former tennis player. She was seeded 6 in the 1977 Australian Open.

== WTA career finals ==
=== Singles: 2 (2 runner-ups) ===
Legend
Tier I
Tier II
Tier III
Tier IV & V

Result	W/L	Date	Tournament	Surface	Opponent	Score
Loss	0–1	Jul 1976	Swedish Open	Clay	(Czechoslovakia) Renáta Tomanová	3–6, 2–6
Loss	0–2	Dec 1977	Queensland Open, Australia	Grass	(Czechoslovakia) Regina Maršíková	1–6, 6–3, 4–6

=== Doubles: 5 (4 titles, 1 runner-up) ===
Result	W/L	Date	Tournament	Surface	Partner	Opponents	Score
Win	1–0	Jul 1976	Austrian Open	Clay	(Sweden) Mimmi Wikstedt	(Germany) Katja Ebbinghaus (Germany) Heidi Eisterlehner	6–4, 2–6, 7–5
Loss	1–1	Aug1977	Swedish Open	Clay	(Romania) Florența Mihai	(Australia) Cynthia Doerner (Argentina) Raquel Giscafré	2–6, 5–7
Win	2–1	Dec 1977	Queensland Open, Australia	Grass	(Czechoslovakia) Regina Maršíková	(Australia) Nerida Gregory (Japan) Naoko Satō	6–3, 3–1 ret.
Win	3–1	Aug 1978	U.S. Clay Court Championships	Clay	(Denmark) Helle Sparre-Viragh	(United States) Barbara Hallquist (United States) Sheila McInerney	6–3, 6–1
Win	4–1	Jul 1979	Austrian Open	Clay	(Australia) Diane Evers	(Romania) Virginia Ruzici (Netherlands) Elly Vessies	6–0, 6–4

== ITF finals ==
Legend
$25,000 tournaments
$10,000 tournaments

=== Singles (8–5) ===
Result	No.	Date	Tournament	Surface	Opponent	Score
Win	1.	29 July 1973	Hanko, Finland	Clay	(New Zealand) Judy Connor	6–4, 6–3
Win	2.	10 September 1973	Ankara, Turkey	Clay	(Spain) Carmen Perea	6–3, 9–7
Win	3.	11 February 1974	Stockholm, Sweden	Hard (i)	(Sweden) Mimmi Wikstedt	6–4, 2–6, 6–3
Loss	4.	7 July 1974	Edinburgh, United Kingdom	Hard	(Czechoslovakia) Alena Palmeová-West	3–6, 2–6
Win	5.	1 December 1974	Gympie, Australia	Hard	(Soviet Union) Natasha Chmyreva	6–2, 7–5
Loss	6.	12 January 1975	Oslo, Norway	Carpet (i)	(Norway) Ellen Grindvold	6–0, 6–7, 2–6
Win	7.	10 July 1976	Felixstowe, United Kingdom	Hard	(United Kingdom) Belinda Thompson	6–4, 7–6
Loss	8.	28 May 1977	Glasgow, United Kingdom	Clay	(United Kingdom) Ann Jones	2–6, 2–6
Loss	9.	3 July 1977	Travemünde, Germany	Clay	(Germany) Katja Ebbinghaus	5–7, 3–6
Win	10.	8 January 1978	Auckland, New Zealand	Hard	(Australia) Marilyn Tesch	6–4, 6–3
Loss	11.	12 February 1978	Toronto, Canada	Hard	(United States) Sharon Walsh	6–4, 4–6, 6–7
Win	12.	9 April 1978	Milan, Italy	Clay	(Romania) Mariana Simionescu	6–3, 5–7, 6–4
Win	13.	8 July 1979	Perugia, Italy	Clay	(United States) Sandy Collins	2–6, 7–6, 6–2

=== Doubles (5–8) ===
Result	No.	Date	Tournament	Surface	Partner	Opponents	Score
Loss	1.	4 March 1973	Aalborg, Denmark	Hard (i)	(Denmark) Anne-Mette Sørensen	(Denmark) Gitte Ejlerskov (Denmark) Mari-Ann Klougart	3–6, 1–6
Loss	2.	10 September 1973	Ankara, Turkey	Clay	(Sweden) Ann-Charlotte Dahlberg	(Denmark) Mari-Ann Klougart (Denmark) Anne-Mette Sørensen	4–6, 7–5, 3–6
Win	3.	11 February 1974	Stockholm, Sweden	Hard (i)	(Sweden) Mimmi Wikstedt	(Sweden) Margareta Forsgårdh (Sweden) Christina Sandberg	6–2, 7–5
Win	4.	10 March 1974	Gothenburg, Sweden	Carpet (i)	(Sweden) Ingrid Löfdahl Bentzer	(Sweden) Margareta Forsgårdh (Sweden) Lotta Stenberg	6–4, 6–4
Win	5.	1 December 1974	Gympie, Australia	Hard	(Belgium) Michèle Gurdal	(New Zealand) Pauline Elliott (Australia) Vicki Lancaster-Kerr	6–2, 7–5
Loss	6.	12 January 1975	Oslo, Norway	Hard (i)	(Sweden) Nina Bohm	(Norway) Ellen Grindvold (Norway) Kirsten Robsahm	4–6, 3–6
Win	7.	27 January 1975	Borås, Sweden	Hard	(Denmark) Anne-Mette Sørensen	(Sweden) Lotta Stenberg (Sweden) Mimmi Wikstedt	2–6, 6–4, 7–5
Win	8.	23 February 1975	Helsinki, Finland	Hard (i)	(Sweden) Nina Bohm	(Denmark) Helle Sparre (Finland) Elina Durchman	6–2, 6–4
Loss	9.	28 May 1977	Glasgow, United Kingdom	Clay	(United Kingdom) Ann Jones	(United Kingdom) Jo Durie (United Kingdom) Cristina Harrison	1–6, 6–4, 2–6
Loss	10.	3 July 1977	Travemünde, Germany	Clay	(Canada) Kathy Morton	(Germany) Katja Ebbinghaus (Germany) Dagmar Hellwegen	4–6, 3–6
Loss	11.	23 April 1978	Nice, France	Clay	(Argentina) Elvira Weisenberger	(Uruguay) Fiorella Bonicelli (France) Gail Lovera	6–3, 3–6, 5–7
Loss	12.	14 July 1980	Båstad, Sweden	Clay	(Sweden) Lena Sandin	(Sweden) Nina Bohm (Sweden) Elisabeth Ekblom	w/o
Loss	13.	24 August 1980	Bayreuth, West Germany	Clay	(West Germany) Iris Riedel-Kühn	(West Germany) Claudia Kohde-Kilsch (West Germany) Eva Pfaff	6–2, 3–6, 1–6
