= Kate Latham =

American tennis player

- Country (sports): United States
- Born: October 25, 1952 (age 72) San Francisco, U.S.
- Prize money: US$ 238,108

Singles
- Career record: 91–140
- Career titles: 0
- Highest ranking: No. 42 (January 17, 1983)

Grand Slam singles results
- Australian Open: 2R (1982)
- French Open: 3R (1978)
- Wimbledon: 3R (1973, 1982)
- US Open: 3R (1974, 1979, 1980, 1982)

Doubles
- Career record: 37–118

Grand Slam doubles results
- Australian Open: 3R (1982)
- French Open: 4R (1980)
- Wimbledon: 4R (1980)
- US Open: 3R (1974, 1980)

Kate Latham (born October 25, 1952) is an American former professional tennis player. She competed in Grand Slam tournaments from 1973 to 1984.
