= Laura duPont =

American tennis player

- Country (sports): United States
- Born: May 4, 1949 Louisville, Kentucky, U.S.
- Died: February 20, 2002 (aged 52) Durham, North Carolina, U.S.
- Height: 5 ft 3 in (1.60 m)
- Plays: Right-handed
- Prize money: US$ 211,614

Singles
- Career record: 79–122
- Highest ranking: No. 23 (1977)

Grand Slam singles results
- French Open: 3R (1977)
- Wimbledon: 4R (1972, 1979)
- US Open: QF (1971)

Doubles
- Career record: 117–119
- Career titles: 5

Grand Slam doubles results
- Australian Open: QF (1975)
- Wimbledon: QF (1973, 1976)
- US Open: QF (1976)

Laura duPont (May 4, 1949 – February 20, 2002) was a female American tennis player. She was the first woman to win a national title in any sport for the University of North Carolina, as well as being the first female All-American at the school. She was not related to the multiple grand slam winner Margaret Osborne duPont.

Born in Louisville, Kentucky, Laura became acquainted with tennis by practicing on the city's public courts. In her adolescent years, DuPont moved to North Carolina, where she showed promise competing in junior tennis championships.

DuPont attended the University of North Carolina where three times she was named Mid-Atlantic Singles Collegiate Champion. DuPont was singles champion in the years 1968, 1970, and 1971. In 1970, she also secured doubles champion. Aside from her tennis accolades at the school, she also played varsity basketball. In 1970, duPont was named North Carolina AAU Athlete of the Year. In 1972, duPont graduated with a B.A. and joined the tennis inter-national circuit soon after. She won the Canadian (1979), Argentine, New Zealand (singles as well as doubles) and German singles.

DuPont's success continued, becoming the South African doubles champion in 1976, a doubles finalist in 1975 and singles finalist in 1976. She won the U.S. Clay Court Championships singles title in 1977, as well as was a doubles finalist in 1976. In 1984, duPont won the U.S. Open 35 and over singles championship.

From 1975 to 1981, she was on the Women's Tennis Association board, serving in the roles of vice president and treasurer.

Laura duPont was inducted into the North Carolina Tennis Hall of Fame in 1977, the Charlotte Catholic High School Hall of Fame in 2000, the Women's collegiate tennis Hall of fame in 2002 and then North Carolina Sports Hall of Fame in 2018.

After being diagnosed with breast cancer, DuPont moved back to North Carolina in 1997. She died at Duke University Medical Center in Durham on February 20, 2002.

== WTA Tour finals ==
=== Doubles 10 (5–5) ===
Legend
Grand Slam	0
WTA Championships	0
Tier I	0
Tier II	0
Tier III	0
Tier IV & V	0

Titles by surface
Hard	3
Clay	1
Grass	0
Carpet	1

Result	W/L	Date	Tournament	Surface	Partner	Opponents	Score
Loss	0–1	Sep 1978	San Antonio, Texas, US	Hard	(France) Françoise Dürr	(South Africa) Ilana Kloss (South Africa) Marise Kruger	1–6, 4–6
Loss	0–2	Nov 1978	Buenos Aires, Argentina	Clay	(Czechoslovakia) Regina Maršíková	(France) Françoise Dürr (United States) Valerie Ziegenfuss	6–1, 4–6, 3–6
Loss	0–3	Nov 1979	Brighton, England	Carpet	(South Africa) Ilana Kloss	(United States) Ann Kiyomura (United States) Anne Smith	2–6, 1–6
Win	1–3	Jan 1980	Cincinnati, Ohio, US	Carpet	(United States) Pam Shriver	(Socialist Federal Republic of Yugoslavia) Mima Jaušovec (United States) Ann Kiyomura	6–3, 6–3
Loss	1–4	Jan 1980	Kansas City, Missouri, US	Carpet	(United States) Pam Shriver	(United States) Billie Jean King (United States) Martina Navratilova	3–6, 1–6
Win	2–4	Mar 1980	Carlsbad, California, US	Hard	(United States) Pam Shriver	(United States) Rosie Casals (United States) JoAnne Russell	6–7, 6–4, 6–1
Win	3–4	Sep 1981	Atlanta, Georgia, US	Hard	(United States) Betsy Nagelsen	(United States) Rosie Casals (United States) Candy Reynolds	6–4, 7–5
Loss	3–5	Oct 1982	Tokyo, Japan	Hard	(United States) Barbara Jordan	(Japan) Naoko Sato (Australia) Brenda Remilton	6–2, 3–6, 3–6
Win	4–5	Oct 1982	Tokyo, Japan	Hard	(United States) Barbara Jordan	(Japan) Naoko Sato (Australia) Brenda Remilton	6–2, 6–7, 6–1
Win	5–5	Nov 1982	Hong Kong	Clay	(United States) Alycia Moulton	(South Africa) Jennifer Mundel (South Africa) Yvonne Vermaak	6–2, 4–6, 7–5
