= Barbara Hallquist =

American tennis player

- Country (sports): United States
- Born: May 1, 1957 (age 69) Pasadena, California, U.S.
- Height: 5 ft 8 in (1.73 m)
- Plays: Right-handed (one-handed backhand)

Singles
- Career titles: 1
- Highest ranking: No. 30

Grand Slam singles results
- Australian Open: 3R (1980)
- French Open: 1R (1982)
- Wimbledon: 3R (1978)
- US Open: QF (1980)

Doubles
- Career titles: 1

Grand Slam doubles results
- Wimbledon: 3R (1979)
- US Open: QF (1980)

Barbara Hallquist DeGroot (born May 1, 1957) is a retired American tennis professional. She was the first female student to receive an athletic scholarship from the University of Southern California (USC) as a result of Title IX legislation. She played tennis for USC from 1976 to 1979.

== College titles ==
Hallquist won the national collegiate singles title in 1976 and 1977. She also won four team national championships. She was a four-year letter winner (1976–1979) and a four-time All-American. Hallquist won seven national collegiate tournaments. She was the winner of the USTA singles titles in 1976 and 1977. She earned MVP honors in 1977 as a member of three US Junior Federation Cup teams.

== Professional career ==
After college, Hallquist turned pro, and she attained a world ranking of 30, completing all four Grand Slam events. In 1980, Hallquist reached the singles quarterfinals at the US Open and advanced twice to the doubles quarterfinals. Her last major appearance was the 1983 US Open.

== Coaching career ==
From 1985 to 1988 Hallquist returned to USC to take on the responsibility of assistant coach. There she helped bring the team to the 1985 NCAA team championship. Hallquist also served as coach at the Cate School in Carpinteria, California. In January 2014 it was announced by head coach Richard Gallien that Barbara Hallquist DeGroot will go back to USC to serve as volunteer assistant coach for the Trojans during its spring season.

== Hall of Fame ==
Hallquist was inducted into the Intercollegiate Tennis Association Women's Collegiate Hall of Fame on November 13, 2010, on the campus of the College of William and Mary in Williamsburg, Virginia, the location of the Hall of Fame.
