= 1980 WTA Tour =

Women's tennis circuit

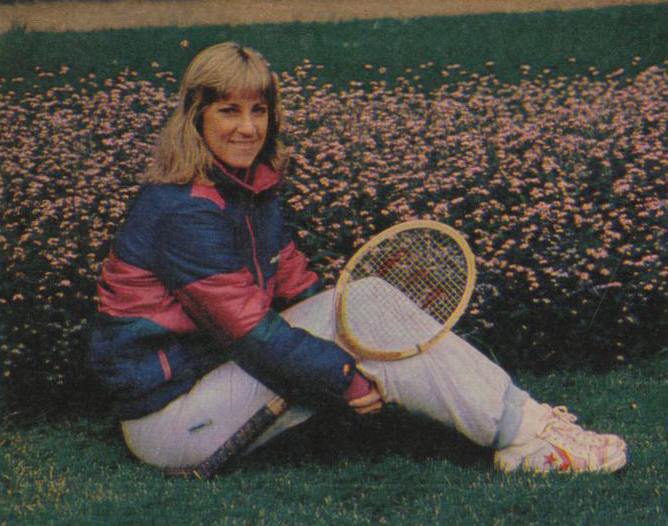
- Chris Evert-Lloyd finished the year as world No. 1 for the fourth time in her career. She won eight singles tournaments during the season, including two majors at the French Open and the US Open. She also finished runner-up at another major, the Wimbledon Championships.

Details
- Duration: 7 January 1980 – 12 January 1981
- Edition: 8th
- Tournaments: 53
- Categories: Grand Slam (4); WTA championships (3); Avon Championship Circuit (10); Colgate Series (32)

Achievements (singles)
- Most titles: (United States) Tracy Austin (12)
- Most finals: (United States) Tracy Austin (16)
- Prize money leader: (United States) Martina Navratilova ($749,250)
- Points leader: (United States) Chris Evert (16.829)

Awards
- Player of the year: (United States) Tracy Austin
- Doubles team of the year: (United States) Kathy Jordan (United States) Anne Smith
- Most improved player of the year: (Czechoslovakia) Hana Mandlíková
- Newcomer of the year: (United States) Andrea Jaeger

The 1980 WTA Tour was the 8th season since the foundation of the Women's Tennis Association. It commenced on January 7, 1980, and concluded on December 24, 1980, after 53 events. It was the elite tour for professional women's tennis organised by the Women's Tennis Association (WTA). The year is divided into two sponsored tours, with the first three months in the United States on the Avon Championships Circuit and the remaining nine months on the world wide Colgate Series Circuit. It included the four Grand Slam tournaments and a series of other events. ITF World Circuit tournaments were not part of the tour, although they awarded points for the WTA World Ranking.

== Schedule ==
The table below shows the 1980 WTA Tour schedule.

Key

Grand Slam tournaments
WTA championships
Avon Championships Circuit
Colgate Series
Non-tour events
Team events

=== January ===
Week	Tournament	Champions	Runners-up	Semifinalists	Quarterfinalists
7 Jan	Avon Championships of Cincinnati; Cincinnati, United States; Avon Championships Circuit; Carpet (i) – $150,000 – 32S/16D	(United States) Tracy Austin; 6–2, 6–1	(United States) Chris Evert-Lloyd	(Australia) Dianne Fromholtz (United States) Billie Jean King	(South Africa) Greer Stevens (United States) Caroline Stoll (Australia) Wendy Turnbull (United States) Kathy Jordan
7 Jan	Avon Championships of Cincinnati; Cincinnati, United States; Avon Championships Circuit; Carpet (i) – $150,000 – 32S/16D	(United States) Laura duPont (United States) Pam Shriver; 6–3, 6–3	(Socialist Federal Republic of Yugoslavia) Mima Jaušovec (United States) Ann Kiyomura	(Australia) Dianne Fromholtz (United States) Billie Jean King	(South Africa) Greer Stevens (United States) Caroline Stoll (Australia) Wendy Turnbull (United States) Kathy Jordan
14 Jan	Avon Championships of Kansas; Kansas City, United States; Avon Championships Circuit; Carpet (i) – $125,000 – 32S/16D	(United States) Martina Navratilova; 6–0, 6–2	(South Africa) Greer Stevens	(United Kingdom) Virginia Wade (United Kingdom) Sue Barker	(United States) Pam Shriver (Australia) Dianne Fromholtz (West Germany) Bettina Bunge (Australia) Evonne Goolagong Cawley
14 Jan	Avon Championships of Kansas; Kansas City, United States; Avon Championships Circuit; Carpet (i) – $125,000 – 32S/16D	(United States) Billie Jean King (United States) Martina Navratilova; 6–3, 6–1	(United States) Laura duPont (United States) Pam Shriver	(United Kingdom) Virginia Wade (United Kingdom) Sue Barker	(United States) Pam Shriver (Australia) Dianne Fromholtz (West Germany) Bettina Bunge (Australia) Evonne Goolagong Cawley
21 Jan	Avon Championships of Chicago; Chicago, United States; Avon Championships Circuit; Carpet (i) – $200,000 – 56S/28D	(United States) Martina Navratilova; 6–4, 6–4	(United States) Chris Evert-Lloyd	(United States) Billie Jean King (Australia) Wendy Turnbull	(South Africa) Greer Stevens (Australia) Dianne Fromholtz (West Germany) Sylvia Hanika (United States) Kathy Jordan
21 Jan	Avon Championships of Chicago; Chicago, United States; Avon Championships Circuit; Carpet (i) – $200,000 – 56S/28D	(United States) Billie Jean King (United States) Martina Navratilova; 6–3, 6–4	(West Germany) Sylvia Hanika (United States) Kathy Jordan	(United States) Billie Jean King (Australia) Wendy Turnbull	(South Africa) Greer Stevens (Australia) Dianne Fromholtz (West Germany) Sylvia Hanika (United States) Kathy Jordan
28 Jan	Avon Championships of Seattle; Seattle, United States; Avon Championships Circuit; Carpet (i) – $150,000 – 32S/16D	(United States) Tracy Austin; 6–2, 7–6^{(7–1)}	(United Kingdom) Virginia Wade	(United States) Chris Evert-Lloyd (United States) Andrea Jaeger	(West Germany) Sylvia Hanika (South Africa) Greer Stevens (United Kingdom) Sue Barker (Romania) Virginia Ruzici
28 Jan	Avon Championships of Seattle; Seattle, United States; Avon Championships Circuit; Carpet (i) – $150,000 – 32S/16D	(United States) Rosie Casals (Australia) Wendy Turnbull; 6–4, 2–6, 7–5	(United Kingdom) Virginia Wade (South Africa) Greer Stevens	(United States) Chris Evert-Lloyd (United States) Andrea Jaeger	(West Germany) Sylvia Hanika (South Africa) Greer Stevens (United Kingdom) Sue Barker (Romania) Virginia Ruzici

=== February ===
Week	Tournament	Champions	Runners-up	Semifinalists	Quarterfinalists
4 Feb	Avon Championships of Los Angeles; Los Angeles, United States; Avon Championships Circuit; Hard – $150,000 – 32S/16D	(United States) Martina Navratilova; 6–2, 6–0	(United States) Tracy Austin	(Australia) Wendy Turnbull (United Kingdom) Virginia Wade	(Romania) Virginia Ruzici (United States) Roberta McCallum (United Kingdom) Sue Barker (United States) Caroline Stoll
4 Feb	Avon Championships of Los Angeles; Los Angeles, United States; Avon Championships Circuit; Hard – $150,000 – 32S/16D	(United States) Rosie Casals (United States) Martina Navratilova; 7–6, 6–2	(United States) Kathy Jordan (United States) Anne Smith	(Australia) Wendy Turnbull (United Kingdom) Virginia Wade	(Romania) Virginia Ruzici (United States) Roberta McCallum (United Kingdom) Sue Barker (United States) Caroline Stoll
11 Feb	Avon Championships of California; Oakland, United States; Avon Championships Circuit; Carpet (i) – $150,000 – 32S/16D	(United States) Martina Navratilova; 6–1, 7–6^{(7–4)}	(Australia) Evonne Goolagong Cawley	(United States) Terry Holladay (United Kingdom) Virginia Wade	(United States) Kathy Jordan (United States) Billie Jean King (United States) Rosie Casals (South Africa) Greer Stevens
11 Feb	Avon Championships of California; Oakland, United States; Avon Championships Circuit; Carpet (i) – $150,000 – 32S/16D	(United Kingdom) Sue Barker (United States) Ann Kiyomura; 6–0, 6–4	(South Africa) Greer Stevens (United Kingdom) Virginia Wade	(United States) Terry Holladay (United Kingdom) Virginia Wade	(United States) Kathy Jordan (United States) Billie Jean King (United States) Rosie Casals (South Africa) Greer Stevens
18 Feb	Avon Championships of Detroit; Detroit, United States; Avon Championships Circuit; Carpet (i) – $200,000 – 64S/32D	(United States) Billie Jean King; 6–3, 6–0	(Australia) Evonne Goolagong Cawley	(Australia) Dianne Fromholtz (Australia) Wendy Turnbull	(United States) Kathy Jordan (United States) Terry Holladay (United States) Andrea Jaeger (Romania) Virginia Ruzici
18 Feb	Avon Championships of Detroit; Detroit, United States; Avon Championships Circuit; Carpet (i) – $200,000 – 64S/32D	(United States) Billie Jean King (South Africa) Ilana Kloss; 3–6, 6–3, 6–2	(United States) Kathy Jordan (United States) Anne Smith	(Australia) Dianne Fromholtz (Australia) Wendy Turnbull	(United States) Kathy Jordan (United States) Terry Holladay (United States) Andrea Jaeger (Romania) Virginia Ruzici
25 Feb	Avon Championships of Houston; Houston, United States; Avon Championships Circuit; Carpet (i) – $150,000 – 33S/15D	(United States) Billie Jean King; 6–1, 6–3	(United States) Martina Navratilova	(Australia) Wendy Turnbull (South Africa) Greer Stevens	(Romania) Virginia Ruzici (Australia) Dianne Fromholtz (United Kingdom) Sue Barker (United States) Tracy Austin
25 Feb	Avon Championships of Houston; Houston, United States; Avon Championships Circuit; Carpet (i) – $150,000 – 33S/15D	(United States) Billie Jean King (South Africa) Ilana Kloss; 3–6, 6–1, 6–4	(Netherlands) Betty Stöve (Australia) Wendy Turnbull	(Australia) Wendy Turnbull (South Africa) Greer Stevens	(Romania) Virginia Ruzici (Australia) Dianne Fromholtz (United Kingdom) Sue Barker (United States) Tracy Austin

=== March ===
Week	Tournament	Champions	Runners-up	Semifinalists	Quarterfinalists
3 Mar	Avon Championships of Dallas; Dallas, United States; Avon Championships Circuit; Carpet (i) – $150,000 – 56S/32D	(United States) Martina Navratilova; 6–3, 6–2	(Australia) Evonne Goolagong Cawley	(United Kingdom) Virginia Wade (Australia) Dianne Fromholtz	(United States) Kathy Jordan (United States) Pam Shriver (Australia) Wendy Turnbull (West Germany) Bettina Bunge
3 Mar	Avon Championships of Dallas; Dallas, United States; Avon Championships Circuit; Carpet (i) – $150,000 – 56S/32D	(United States) Billie Jean King (United States) Martina Navratilova; 4–6, 6–3, 6–3	(United States) Rosie Casals (Australia) Wendy Turnbull	(United Kingdom) Virginia Wade (Australia) Dianne Fromholtz	(United States) Kathy Jordan (United States) Pam Shriver (Australia) Wendy Turnbull (West Germany) Bettina Bunge
10 Mar	Avon Championships of Boston; Boston, United States; Avon Championships Circuit; Carpet (i) – $125,000 – 32S/16D	(United States) Tracy Austin; 6–2, 6–1	(United Kingdom) Virginia Wade	(United States) Billie Jean King (Socialist Federal Republic of Yugoslavia) Mima Jaušovec	(Romania) Virginia Ruzici (United States) Kathy Jordan (United States) Stacy Margolin (United States) JoAnne Russell
10 Mar	Avon Championships of Boston; Boston, United States; Avon Championships Circuit; Carpet (i) – $125,000 – 32S/16D	(United States) Rosie Casals (Australia) Wendy Turnbull; 6–4, 7–6^{(7–4)}	(United States) Billie Jean King (South Africa) Ilana Kloss	(United States) Billie Jean King (Socialist Federal Republic of Yugoslavia) Mima Jaušovec	(Romania) Virginia Ruzici (United States) Kathy Jordan (United States) Stacy Margolin (United States) JoAnne Russell
17 Mar	Avon Championships; New York City, United States; WTA Championships; Carpet (i) – $300,000 – 8S/4D; Singles – Doubles	(United States) Tracy Austin; 6–2, 2–6, 6–2	(United States) Martina Navratilova	(Australia) Evonne Goolagong Cawley (United States) Billie Jean King	
17 Mar	Avon Championships; New York City, United States; WTA Championships; Carpet (i) – $300,000 – 8S/4D; Singles – Doubles	(United States) Billie Jean King (United States) Martina Navratilova; 6–3, 4–6, 6–3	(United States) Rosie Casals (Australia) Wendy Turnbull	(Australia) Evonne Goolagong Cawley (United States) Billie Jean King	
24 Mar	Honda Civic Classic; Carlsbad, California, United States; Colgate Series (A); Carpet (i) – $50,000 – 32S/16D	(United States) Pam Shriver; 6–1, 6–2	(United States) Kate Latham	(United States) Stacy Margolin (United States) Pam Teeguarden	(Czechoslovakia) Renáta Tomanová (United States) Terry Holladay (United States) Renée Richards (United States) Jeanne DuVall
24 Mar	Honda Civic Classic; Carlsbad, California, United States; Colgate Series (A); Carpet (i) – $50,000 – 32S/16D	(United States) Laura duPont (United States) Pam Shriver; 6–7, 6–4, 6–1	(United States) Rosie Casals (United States) JoAnne Russell	(United States) Stacy Margolin (United States) Pam Teeguarden	(Czechoslovakia) Renáta Tomanová (United States) Terry Holladay (United States) Renée Richards (United States) Jeanne DuVall
31 Mar	Bridgestone Doubles Championships; Tokyo, Japan; Colgate Series; Carpet (i) – $150,000 – 8D	(United States) Billie Jean King (United States) Martina Navratilova; 7–5, 6–3	(United Kingdom) Sue Barker (United States) Ann Kiyomura		

=== April ===
Week	Tournament	Champions	Runners-up	Semifinalists	Quarterfinalists
7 Apr	Family Circle Cup; Hilton Head Island, United States; Colgate Series (AAA); Clay – $150,000 – 56S/32D	(United States) Tracy Austin; 3–6, 6–1, 6–0	(Czechoslovakia) Regina Maršíková	(Argentina) Ivanna Madruga (Czechoslovakia) Hana Mandlíková	(South Africa) Yvonne Vermaak (Romania) Virginia Ruzici (United States) Kathy Jordan (Australia) Evonne Goolagong Cawley
7 Apr	Family Circle Cup; Hilton Head Island, United States; Colgate Series (AAA); Clay – $150,000 – 56S/32D	(United States) Kathy Jordan (United States) Anne Smith; 6–1, 6–1	(United States) Candy Reynolds (United States) Paula Smith	(Argentina) Ivanna Madruga (Czechoslovakia) Hana Mandlíková	(South Africa) Yvonne Vermaak (Romania) Virginia Ruzici (United States) Kathy Jordan (Australia) Evonne Goolagong Cawley
14 Apr	Murjani WTA Championships; Amelia Island, United States; Colgate Series (AA); Clay – $100,000 – 56S/32D	(United States) Martina Navratilova; 5–7, 6–3, 6–2	(Czechoslovakia) Hana Mandlíková	(Romania) Virginia Ruzici (South Africa) Yvonne Vermaak	(United States) Pam Shriver (Argentina) Ivanna Madruga (United States) Jeanne DuVall (United States) Leslie Allen
14 Apr	Murjani WTA Championships; Amelia Island, United States; Colgate Series (AA); Clay – $100,000 – 56S/32D	(United States) Rosie Casals (South Africa) Ilana Kloss; 7–6^{(7–5)}, 7–6^{(7–3)}	(United States) Kathy Jordan (United States) Pam Shriver	(Romania) Virginia Ruzici (South Africa) Yvonne Vermaak	(United States) Pam Shriver (Argentina) Ivanna Madruga (United States) Jeanne DuVall (United States) Leslie Allen
28 Apr	United Airlines Sunbird Cup; Orlando, United States; Colgate Series (AAAA); Clay – $200,000 – 20S	(United States) Martina Navratilova; 6–2, 6–4	(United States) Tracy Austin	(United States) Barbara Jordan (United States) Andrea Jaeger	(United States) Pam Shriver (United States) Paula Smith (United Kingdom) Sue Barker (Argentina) Ivanna Madruga

=== May ===
Week	Tournament	Champions	Runners-up	Semifinalists	Quarterfinalists
5 May	Italian Open; Perugia, Italy; Colgate Series (AA); Clay – $100,000 – 56S/32D	(United States) Chris Evert-Lloyd; 5–7, 6–2, 6–2	(Romania) Virginia Ruzici	(Czechoslovakia) Hana Mandlíková (Argentina) Ivanna Madruga	(United States) Laura duPont (Czechoslovakia) Renáta Tomanová (West Germany) Bettina Bunge (United Kingdom) Virginia Wade
5 May	Italian Open; Perugia, Italy; Colgate Series (AA); Clay – $100,000 – 56S/32D	(Czechoslovakia) Hana Mandlíková (Czechoslovakia) Renáta Tomanová; 6–4, 6–1	(Argentina) Ivanna Madruga (Argentina) Adriana Villagrán	(Czechoslovakia) Hana Mandlíková (Argentina) Ivanna Madruga	(United States) Laura duPont (Czechoslovakia) Renáta Tomanová (West Germany) Bettina Bunge (United Kingdom) Virginia Wade
19 May	Federation Cup; West Berlin, West Germany; Team event Clay	United States; 3-0	Australia	Czechoslovakia; West Germany	Soviet Union; Romania; Great Britain; Sweden
26 May; 2 June	French Open; Paris, France; Grand Slam; Clay – $300,000 – 112S/64Q/48D/32X; Singles – Doubles – Mixed doubles	(United States) Chris Evert-Lloyd; 6–0, 6–3	(Romania) Virginia Ruzici	(Czechoslovakia) Hana Mandlíková (Australia) Dianne Fromholtz	(United States) Kathy Jordan (Argentina) Ivanna Madruga (Australia) Wendy Turnbull (United States) Billie Jean King
26 May; 2 June	French Open; Paris, France; Grand Slam; Clay – $300,000 – 112S/64Q/48D/32X; Singles – Doubles – Mixed doubles	(United States) Kathy Jordan (United States) Anne Smith; 6–1, 6–0	(Argentina) Ivanna Madruga (Argentina) Adriana Villagrán	(Czechoslovakia) Hana Mandlíková (Australia) Dianne Fromholtz	(United States) Kathy Jordan (Argentina) Ivanna Madruga (Australia) Wendy Turnbull (United States) Billie Jean King
26 May; 2 June	French Open; Paris, France; Grand Slam; Clay – $300,000 – 112S/64Q/48D/32X; Singles – Doubles – Mixed doubles	(United States) Anne Smith (United States) Billy Martin; 2–6, 6–4, 8–6	(Czechoslovakia) Renáta Tomanová (Czechoslovakia) Stanislav Birner	(Czechoslovakia) Hana Mandlíková (Australia) Dianne Fromholtz	(United States) Kathy Jordan (Argentina) Ivanna Madruga (Australia) Wendy Turnbull (United States) Billie Jean King

=== June ===
Week	Tournament	Champions	Runners-up	Semifinalists	Quarterfinalists
9 Jun	Crossley Carpets Tournament; Chichester, Great Britain; Colgate Series (AA); Grass – $100,000 – 56S/28D	(United States) Chris Evert-Lloyd; 6–3, 6–7^{(4–7)}, 7–5	(Australia) Evonne Goolagong Cawley	(United States) Pam Shriver (Netherlands) Betty Stöve	(United States) Andrea Jaeger (United States) Betsy Nagelsen (United States) Sharon Walsh (West Germany) Bettina Bunge
9 Jun	Crossley Carpets Tournament; Chichester, Great Britain; Colgate Series (AA); Grass – $100,000 – 56S/28D	(United States) Pam Shriver (Netherlands) Betty Stöve; 6–4, 7–5	(United States) Rosie Casals (Australia) Wendy Turnbull	(United States) Pam Shriver (Netherlands) Betty Stöve	(United States) Andrea Jaeger (United States) Betsy Nagelsen (United States) Sharon Walsh (West Germany) Bettina Bunge
16 Jun	BMW Challenge; Eastbourne, Great Britain; Colgate Series (AAA); Grass – $125,000 – 64S/32D	(United States) Tracy Austin; 7–6, 6–2	(Australia) Wendy Turnbull	(South Africa) Greer Stevens (United States) Mareen Louie Harper	(Netherlands) Betty Stöve (Australia) Dianne Fromholtz (United States) Diane Desfor (Czechoslovakia) Hana Mandlíková
16 Jun	BMW Challenge; Eastbourne, Great Britain; Colgate Series (AAA); Grass – $125,000 – 64S/32D	(United States) Kathy Jordan (United States) Anne Smith; 6–4, 6–1	(United States) Pam Shriver (Netherlands) Betty Stöve	(South Africa) Greer Stevens (United States) Mareen Louie Harper	(Netherlands) Betty Stöve (Australia) Dianne Fromholtz (United States) Diane Desfor (Czechoslovakia) Hana Mandlíková
23 Jun; 30 Jun	Wimbledon Championships; London, Great Britain; Grand Slam; Grass – $300,000 – 112S/64Q/48D/48X; Singles – Doubles – Mixed doubles	(Australia) Evonne Goolagong Cawley; 6–1, 7–6^{(7–4)}	(United States) Chris Evert-Lloyd	(United States) Martina Navratilova (United States) Tracy Austin	(United States) Billie Jean King (United States) Andrea Jaeger (Australia) Wendy Turnbull (South Africa) Greer Stevens
23 Jun; 30 Jun	Wimbledon Championships; London, Great Britain; Grand Slam; Grass – $300,000 – 112S/64Q/48D/48X; Singles – Doubles – Mixed doubles	(United States) Kathy Jordan (United States) Anne Smith; 4–6, 7–5, 6–1	(United States) Rosie Casals (Australia) Wendy Turnbull	(United States) Martina Navratilova (United States) Tracy Austin	(United States) Billie Jean King (United States) Andrea Jaeger (Australia) Wendy Turnbull (South Africa) Greer Stevens
23 Jun; 30 Jun	Wimbledon Championships; London, Great Britain; Grand Slam; Grass – $300,000 – 112S/64Q/48D/48X; Singles – Doubles – Mixed doubles	(United States) Tracy Austin (United States) John Austin; 4–6, 7–6^{(8–6)}, 6–3	(Australia) Dianne Fromholtz (Australia) Mark Edmondson	(United States) Martina Navratilova (United States) Tracy Austin	(United States) Billie Jean King (United States) Andrea Jaeger (Australia) Wendy Turnbull (South Africa) Greer Stevens

=== July ===
Week	Tournament	Champions	Runners-up	Semifinalists	Quarterfinalists
14 Jul	Player's Classic; Montreal, Canada; Colgate Series (AA); Hard – $100,000 – 56S/32D	(United States) Martina Navratilova; 6–2, 6–1	(South Africa) Greer Stevens	(United States) JoAnne Russell (United States) Pam Shriver	(United States) Anne Smith (United States) Laura duPont (United States) Ann Kiyomura (United States) JoAnne Russell
14 Jul	Player's Classic; Montreal, Canada; Colgate Series (AA); Hard – $100,000 – 56S/32D	(United States) Anne Smith (United States) Pam Shriver; 3–6, 6–6^{(6–3)} ret.	(United States) Ann Kiyomura (South Africa) Greer Stevens	(United States) JoAnne Russell (United States) Pam Shriver	(United States) Anne Smith (United States) Laura duPont (United States) Ann Kiyomura (United States) JoAnne Russell
21 Jul	Central Fidelity Banks International; Richmond, United States; Colgate Series (AA); Carpet (i) – $100,000 – 32S/16D	(United States) Martina Navratilova; 6–3, 6–0	(United States) Mary Lou Piatek	(United States) Pam Shriver (United States) Betsy Nagelsen	(United States) Barbara Potter (United States) Stacy Margolin (South Africa) Rosalyn Fairbank (United States) Wendy White
21 Jul	Central Fidelity Banks International; Richmond, United States; Colgate Series (AA); Carpet (i) – $100,000 – 32S/16D	(United States) Billie Jean King (United States) Martina Navratilova; 6–4, 4–6, 6–3	(United States) Pam Shriver (United States) Anne Smith	(United States) Pam Shriver (United States) Betsy Nagelsen	(United States) Barbara Potter (United States) Stacy Margolin (South Africa) Rosalyn Fairbank (United States) Wendy White
21 Jul	Austrian Open; Kitzbühel, Austria; Colgate Series (A); Clay – $50,000 – 32S/16D	(Romania) Virginia Ruzici; 3–6, 1-1 Ret	(Czechoslovakia) Hana Mandlíková	(West Germany) Sylvia Hanika (Czechoslovakia) Regina Maršíková	(Switzerland) Hana Strachoňová (Czechoslovakia) Renáta Tomanová (West Germany) Heidi Eisterlehner (Czechoslovakia) Iva Budařová
21 Jul	Austrian Open; Kitzbühel, Austria; Colgate Series (A); Clay – $50,000 – 32S/16D	(West Germany) Claudia Kohde-Kilsch (West Germany) Eva Pfaff; Walkover	(Czechoslovakia) Hana Mandlíková (Czechoslovakia) Renáta Tomanová	(West Germany) Sylvia Hanika (Czechoslovakia) Regina Maršíková	(Switzerland) Hana Strachoňová (Czechoslovakia) Renáta Tomanová (West Germany) Heidi Eisterlehner (Czechoslovakia) Iva Budařová
28 Jul	Wells Fargo Open; San Diego, United States; Colgate Series (AA) $125,000 – hard- 32S/16D	(United States) Tracy Austin; 6–1, 6–3	(Australia) Wendy Turnbull	(United States) Stacy Margolin (United States) Ann Kiyomura	(South Africa) Rosalyn Fairbank (United States) Terry Holladay (United States) Laura duPont (United States) Diane Desfor
28 Jul	Wells Fargo Open; San Diego, United States; Colgate Series (AA) $125,000 – hard- 32S/16D	(United States) Tracy Austin (United States) Ann Kiyomura; 3–6, 6–4, 6–3	(United States) Rosie Casals (Australia) Wendy Turnbull	(United States) Stacy Margolin (United States) Ann Kiyomura	(South Africa) Rosalyn Fairbank (United States) Terry Holladay (United States) Laura duPont (United States) Diane Desfor

=== August ===
Week	Tournament	Champions	Runners-up	Semifinalists	Quarterfinalists
4 Aug	U.S. Clay Court Championships; Indianapolis, United States; Colgate Series (AAAA); Clay – $200,000 – 56S/32D; Singles – Doubles	(United States) Chris Evert-Lloyd; 6–4, 6–3	(United States) Andrea Jaeger	(Argentina) Ivanna Madruga (Australia) Evonne Goolagong Cawley	(United States) Anne White (Switzerland) Hana Strachoňová (United States) Mary Lou Piatek (Czechoslovakia) Regina Maršíková
4 Aug	U.S. Clay Court Championships; Indianapolis, United States; Colgate Series (AAAA); Clay – $200,000 – 56S/32D; Singles – Doubles	(United States) Anne Smith (United States) Paula Smith; 4–6, 6–3, 6–4	(Romania) Virginia Ruzici (Czechoslovakia) Renáta Tomanová	(Argentina) Ivanna Madruga (Australia) Evonne Goolagong Cawley	(United States) Anne White (Switzerland) Hana Strachoňová (United States) Mary Lou Piatek (Czechoslovakia) Regina Maršíková
11 Aug	Player's Canadian Open; Toronto, Canada; Colgate Series (AAA); Hard – $150,000 – 56S/32D	(United States) Chris Evert-Lloyd; 6–3, 6–1	(Romania) Virginia Ruzici	(United States) Kathy Jordan (United States) Pam Shriver	(United States) Anne Smith (Australia) Evonne Goolagong Cawley (United States) Andrea Jaeger (Czechoslovakia) Hana Mandlíková
11 Aug	Player's Canadian Open; Toronto, Canada; Colgate Series (AAA); Hard – $150,000 – 56S/32D	(United States) Andrea Jaeger (Czechoslovakia) Regina Maršíková; 6–1, 6–3	(United States) Ann Kiyomura (United States) Betsy Nagelsen	(United States) Kathy Jordan (United States) Pam Shriver	(United States) Anne Smith (Australia) Evonne Goolagong Cawley (United States) Andrea Jaeger (Czechoslovakia) Hana Mandlíková
18 Aug	Volvo Women's Cup; Mahwah, United States; Colgate Series (AA); Hard – $100,000 – 56S/32D	(Czechoslovakia) Hana Mandlíková; 6–7^{(0–7)}, 6–2, 6–2	(United States) Andrea Jaeger	(West Germany) Sylvia Hanika (United States) Martina Navratilova	(United States) Tracy Austin (United States) Trey Lewis (Australia) Dianne Fromholtz (United States) Kathy Jordan
18 Aug	Volvo Women's Cup; Mahwah, United States; Colgate Series (AA); Hard – $100,000 – 56S/32D	(United States) Martina Navratilova (United States) Candy Reynolds; 4–6, 6–3, 6–1	(United States) Pam Shriver (Netherlands) Betty Stöve	(West Germany) Sylvia Hanika (United States) Martina Navratilova	(United States) Tracy Austin (United States) Trey Lewis (Australia) Dianne Fromholtz (United States) Kathy Jordan
25 Aug; 1 Sep	US Open; New York City, United States; Grand Slam; Hard – $350,000 – 128S/64Q/64D/32X; Singles – Doubles – Mixed doubles	(United States) Chris Evert-Lloyd; 5–7, 6–1, 6–1	(Czechoslovakia) Hana Mandlíková	(United States) Tracy Austin (United States) Andrea Jaeger	(United States) Pam Shriver (Socialist Federal Republic of Yugoslavia) Mima Jaušovec (Argentina) Ivanna Madruga (United States) Barbara Hallquist
25 Aug; 1 Sep	US Open; New York City, United States; Grand Slam; Hard – $350,000 – 128S/64Q/64D/32X; Singles – Doubles – Mixed doubles	(United States) Billie Jean King (United States) Martina Navratilova; 7–6^{(7–2)}, 7–5	(United States) Pam Shriver (Netherlands) Betty Stöve	(United States) Tracy Austin (United States) Andrea Jaeger	(United States) Pam Shriver (Socialist Federal Republic of Yugoslavia) Mima Jaušovec (Argentina) Ivanna Madruga (United States) Barbara Hallquist
25 Aug; 1 Sep	US Open; New York City, United States; Grand Slam; Hard – $350,000 – 128S/64Q/64D/32X; Singles – Doubles – Mixed doubles	(Australia) Wendy Turnbull (United States) Marty Riessen; 7–5, 6–2	(Netherlands) Betty Stöve (South Africa) Frew McMillan	(United States) Tracy Austin (United States) Andrea Jaeger	(United States) Pam Shriver (Socialist Federal Republic of Yugoslavia) Mima Jaušovec (Argentina) Ivanna Madruga (United States) Barbara Hallquist

=== September ===
Week	Tournament	Champions	Runners-up	Semifinalists	Quarterfinalists
8 Sep	Toray Sillook Open; Tokyo, Japan; Colgate Series (AA); Carpet (i) – $100,000 – 28S	(United States) Billie Jean King; 7–5, 6–4	(United States) Terry Holladay	(Australia) Dianne Fromholtz (United States) Leslie Allen	(Socialist Federal Republic of Yugoslavia) Mima Jaušovec (Czechoslovakia) Regina Maršíková (Czechoslovakia) Hana Mandlíková (Australia) Wendy Turnbull
8 Sep	Women‟s Games; Salt Lake City, United States; Colgate Series (A); Hard – $50,000 – 16S/8D	(Romania) Virginia Ruzici; 6–1, 6–3	(Argentina) Ivanna Madruga	(United States) Barbara Potter (South Africa) Tanya Harford	(United States) Pam Teeguarden (United States) JoAnne Russell (United States) Barbara Jordan (Romania) Lucia Romanov
8 Sep	Women‟s Games; Salt Lake City, United States; Colgate Series (A); Hard – $50,000 – 16S/8D	(Romania) Virginia Ruzici (United States) Pam Teeguarden; 6–4, 7–5	(United States) Barbara Jordan (United States) JoAnne Russell	(United States) Barbara Potter (South Africa) Tanya Harford	(United States) Pam Teeguarden (United States) JoAnne Russell (United States) Barbara Jordan (Romania) Lucia Romanov
15 Sep	Buick Riviera Classic; Las Vegas, United States; Colgate Series (AAAA); Hard – $200,000 – 32S/16D	(United States) Andrea Jaeger; 7–5, 4–6, 6–3	(Czechoslovakia) Hana Mandlíková	(United States) Martina Navratilova (West Germany) Sylvia Hanika	(Australia) Wendy Turnbull (United States) Kathy Jordan (United States) Anne Smith (Socialist Federal Republic of Yugoslavia) Mima Jaušovec
15 Sep	Buick Riviera Classic; Las Vegas, United States; Colgate Series (AAAA); Hard – $200,000 – 32S/16D	(United States) Kathy Jordan (United States) Anne Smith; 2–6, 6–4, 6–3	(United States) Martina Navratilova (Netherlands) Betty Stöve	(United States) Martina Navratilova (West Germany) Sylvia Hanika	(Australia) Wendy Turnbull (United States) Kathy Jordan (United States) Anne Smith (Socialist Federal Republic of Yugoslavia) Mima Jaušovec
22 Sep	Davison‟s Classic; Atlanta, United States; Colgate Series (AA); Hard – $100,000 – 32S/16D	(Czechoslovakia) Hana Mandlíková; 6–3, 7–5	(Australia) Wendy Turnbull	(United States) Chris Evert-Lloyd (Australia) Dianne Fromholtz	(United States) Kathy Jordan (United States) Pam Teeguarden (Romania) Lucia Romanov (United States) JoAnne Russell
22 Sep	Davison‟s Classic; Atlanta, United States; Colgate Series (AA); Hard – $100,000 – 32S/16D	(United States) Barbara Potter (United States) Sharon Walsh; 6–3, 6–1	(United States) Kathy Jordan (United States) Anne Smith	(United States) Chris Evert-Lloyd (Australia) Dianne Fromholtz	(United States) Kathy Jordan (United States) Pam Teeguarden (Romania) Lucia Romanov (United States) JoAnne Russell
29 Sep	US Indoor – Michelob Light Classic; Minneapolis, United States; Colgate Series (AA); Carpet (i) – $100,000 – 32S/16D	(United States) Tracy Austin; 6–1, 2–6, 6–2	(Australia) Dianne Fromholtz	(Australia) Wendy Turnbull (United States) Billie Jean King	(United States) Anne Smith (United Kingdom) Anne Hobbs (United States) Renée Richards (United States) Roberta McCallum
29 Sep	US Indoor – Michelob Light Classic; Minneapolis, United States; Colgate Series (AA); Carpet (i) – $100,000 – 32S/16D	(United States) Ann Kiyomura (United States) Candy Reynolds; 6–3, 4–6, 6–1	(United States) Anne Smith (United States) Paula Smith	(Australia) Wendy Turnbull (United States) Billie Jean King	(United States) Anne Smith (United Kingdom) Anne Hobbs (United States) Renée Richards (United States) Roberta McCallum

=== October ===
Week	Tournament	Champions	Runners-up	Semifinalists	Quarterfinalists
6 Oct	Thunderbird Classic; Phoenix, United States; Colgate Series (AA); Hard – $100,000 – 32S/16D	(Czechoslovakia) Regina Maršíková; 7–6^{(10–8)}, 7–6^{(7–3)}	(Australia) Wendy Turnbull	(United States) Caroline Stoll (United States) Pam Shriver	(United States) Tracy Austin (United States) Trey Lewis (United States) Dana Gilbert (South Korea) Lee Duk-hee
6 Oct	Thunderbird Classic; Phoenix, United States; Colgate Series (AA); Hard – $100,000 – 32S/16D	(United States) Pam Shriver (United States) Paula Smith; 6–0, 6–4	(United States) Ann Kiyomura (United States) Candy Reynolds	(United States) Caroline Stoll (United States) Pam Shriver	(United States) Tracy Austin (United States) Trey Lewis (United States) Dana Gilbert (South Korea) Lee Duk-hee
13 Oct	Borden Classic; Nagoya, Japan; Colgate Series (A); Hard – $50,000 – 32S/16D	(United States) Dana Gilbert; 5-1 ret	(United States) Barbara Jordan	(West Germany) Heidi Eisterlehner (United States) Mareen Louie Harper	(Argentina) Ivanna Madruga (United States) Lindsay Morse (Czechoslovakia) Renáta Tomanová (United States) Marcie Louie
13 Oct	Borden Classic; Nagoya, Japan; Colgate Series (A); Hard – $50,000 – 32S/16D	(United States) Lindsay Morse (United States) Jean Nachand; 6–3, 6–1	(Australia) Nerida Gregory (Hungary) Marie Pinterová	(West Germany) Heidi Eisterlehner (United States) Mareen Louie Harper	(Argentina) Ivanna Madruga (United States) Lindsay Morse (Czechoslovakia) Renáta Tomanová (United States) Marcie Louie
13 Oct	Lynda Carter Classic; Deerfield Beach, United States; Colgate Series (AAA); Hard – $125,000 – 32S/16D	(United States) Chris Evert-Lloyd; 6–4, 6–1	(United States) Andrea Jaeger	(Czechoslovakia) Regina Maršíková (United States) Martina Navratilova	(Romania) Virginia Ruzici (United States) Sherry Acker (United States) Pam Shriver (United Kingdom) Sue Barker
13 Oct	Lynda Carter Classic; Deerfield Beach, United States; Colgate Series (AAA); Hard – $125,000 – 32S/16D	(United States) Andrea Jaeger (Czechoslovakia) Regina Maršíková; 1–6, 6–1, 6–2	(Czechoslovakia) Martina Navratilova (United States) Candy Reynolds	(Czechoslovakia) Regina Maršíková (United States) Martina Navratilova	(Romania) Virginia Ruzici (United States) Sherry Acker (United States) Pam Shriver (United Kingdom) Sue Barker
20 Oct	Daihatsu Challenge; Brighton, Great Britain; Colgate Series (AAA); Carpet (i) – $125,000 – 32S/16D	(United States) Chris Evert-Lloyd; 6–4, 5–7, 6–3	(United States) Martina Navratilova	(West Germany) Sylvia Hanika (South Africa) Greer Stevens	(Romania) Virginia Ruzici (Czechoslovakia) Hana Mandlíková (Australia) Dianne Fromholtz (United States) Barbara Potter
20 Oct	Daihatsu Challenge; Brighton, Great Britain; Colgate Series (AAA); Carpet (i) – $125,000 – 32S/16D	(United States) Kathy Jordan (United States) Anne Smith; 6–3, 7–5	(United States) Martina Navratilova (Netherlands) Betty Stöve	(West Germany) Sylvia Hanika (South Africa) Greer Stevens	(Romania) Virginia Ruzici (Czechoslovakia) Hana Mandlíková (Australia) Dianne Fromholtz (United States) Barbara Potter
20 Oct	Hit-Union Japan Open; Tokyo, Japan; Colgate Series (A); Hard – $50,000 – S/D	(Romania) Mariana Simionescu; 6–4, 6–4	(Australia) Nerida Gregory	(Hungary) Marie Pinterová (United States) Dana Gilbert	(Argentina) Ivanna Madruga (China) Yu Li-Qiao (West Germany) Heidi Eisterlehner (United States) Julie Harrington
20 Oct	Hit-Union Japan Open; Tokyo, Japan; Colgate Series (A); Hard – $50,000 – S/D	(United States) Dana Gilbert (United States) Mareen Louie Harper; 7–5, 7–6	(Australia) Nerida Gregory (Hungary) Marie Pinterová	(Hungary) Marie Pinterová (United States) Dana Gilbert	(Argentina) Ivanna Madruga (China) Yu Li-Qiao (West Germany) Heidi Eisterlehner (United States) Julie Harrington
27 Oct	Stockholm Open; Stockholm, Sweden; Colgate Series (A); Carpet (i) – $75,000 – 32S/16D	(Czechoslovakia) Hana Mandlíková; 6–2, 6–2	(West Germany) Bettina Bunge	(Romania) Virginia Ruzici (West Germany) Sylvia Hanika	(United States) JoAnne Russell (Sweden) Lena Sandin (Socialist Federal Republic of Yugoslavia) Mima Jaušovec (West Germany) Claudia Kohde-Kilsch
27 Oct	Stockholm Open; Stockholm, Sweden; Colgate Series (A); Carpet (i) – $75,000 – 32S/16D	(Romania) Virginia Ruzici (Socialist Federal Republic of Yugoslavia) Mima Jaušovec; 6–2, 6–1	(Czechoslovakia) Hana Mandlíková (Netherlands) Betty Stöve	(Romania) Virginia Ruzici (West Germany) Sylvia Hanika	(United States) JoAnne Russell (Sweden) Lena Sandin (Socialist Federal Republic of Yugoslavia) Mima Jaušovec (West Germany) Claudia Kohde-Kilsch

=== November ===
Week	Tournament	Champions	Runners-up	Semifinalists	Quarterfinalists
3 Nov	Seiko Classic; Hong Kong; Colgate Series (A); Hard – $50,000 – 32S/16D	(Australia) Wendy Turnbull; 6–2, 6–0	(United States) Mareen Louie Harper	(United States) Sharon Walsh (Australia) Susan Leo	(United States) Julie Harrington (Australia) Nerida Gregory (United Kingdom) Jane Plackett (Australia) Leanne Harrison
3 Nov	Seiko Classic; Hong Kong; Colgate Series (A); Hard – $50,000 – 32S/16D	(Australia) Wendy Turnbull (United States) Sharon Walsh; 6–1, 6–2	(United States) Penny Johnson (Chile) Silvana Urroz	(United States) Sharon Walsh (Australia) Susan Leo	(United States) Julie Harrington (Australia) Nerida Gregory (United Kingdom) Jane Plackett (Australia) Leanne Harrison
3 Nov	Porsche Tennis Grand Prix; Stuttgart, West Germany; Colgate Series (AAA); Hard (i) – $125,000 – 32S/16D	(United States) Tracy Austin; 6–2, 7–5	(United States) Sherry Acker	(United States) Andrea Jaeger (Romania) Virginia Ruzici	(Socialist Federal Republic of Yugoslavia) Mima Jaušovec (West Germany) Sylvia Hanika (United States) Pam Teeguarden (Switzerland) Isabelle Villiger
3 Nov	Porsche Tennis Grand Prix; Stuttgart, West Germany; Colgate Series (AAA); Hard (i) – $125,000 – 32S/16D	(Czechoslovakia) Hana Mandlíková (Netherlands) Betty Stöve; 6–4, 7–5	(United States) Kathy Jordan (United States) Anne Smith	(United States) Andrea Jaeger (Romania) Virginia Ruzici	(Socialist Federal Republic of Yugoslavia) Mima Jaušovec (West Germany) Sylvia Hanika (United States) Pam Teeguarden (Switzerland) Isabelle Villiger
10 Nov	Florida Federal Open; Tampa, United States; Colgate Series (AAA); Clay – $125,000 – 56S/28D	(United States) Andrea Jaeger; Walkover	(United States) Tracy Austin	(United States) Kathrin Keil (United States) Mary Lou Daniels	(United States) Susan Mascarin (United States) Anne White (United States) Beth Norton (United States) Wendy White
10 Nov	Florida Federal Open; Tampa, United States; Colgate Series (AAA); Clay – $125,000 – 56S/28D	(United States) Rosie Casals (United States) Candy Reynolds; 7–6, 7–5	(United States) Anne Smith (United States) Paula Smith	(United States) Kathrin Keil (United States) Mary Lou Daniels	(United States) Susan Mascarin (United States) Anne White (United States) Beth Norton (United States) Wendy White
10 Nov	Dutch International Indoors; Amsterdam, Netherlands; Colgate Series (A); Carpet (i) – $75,000 – 32S/16D	(Czechoslovakia) Hana Mandlíková; 6–2, 6–1	(Romania) Virginia Ruzici	(United States) Barbara Potter (United States) JoAnne Russell	(United States) Renee Blount (Socialist Federal Republic of Yugoslavia) Mima Jaušovec (Netherlands) Betty Stöve (Switzerland) Hana Strachoňová
10 Nov	Dutch International Indoors; Amsterdam, Netherlands; Colgate Series (A); Carpet (i) – $75,000 – 32S/16D	(Czechoslovakia) Hana Mandlíková (Netherlands) Betty Stöve; 7–6, 7–6	(Socialist Federal Republic of Yugoslavia) Mima Jaušovec (United States) JoAnne Russell	(United States) Barbara Potter (United States) JoAnne Russell	(United States) Renee Blount (Socialist Federal Republic of Yugoslavia) Mima Jaušovec (Netherlands) Betty Stöve (Switzerland) Hana Strachoňová
17 Nov	Wightman Cup; London, Great Britain; Hard (i); Team event	United States 5–2	Great Britain		
24 Nov; 7 Dec	Toyota Australian Open; Melbourne, Australia; Grand Slam; Grass – $200,000 – 64S/32Q/32D; Singles – Doubles	(Czechoslovakia) Hana Mandlíková; 6–0, 7–5	(Australia) Wendy Turnbull	(United States) Martina Navratilova (Socialist Federal Republic of Yugoslavia) Mima Jaušovec	(South Africa) Greer Stevens (United States) Pam Shriver (Romania) Virginia Ruzici (United States) Candy Reynolds
24 Nov; 7 Dec	Toyota Australian Open; Melbourne, Australia; Grand Slam; Grass – $200,000 – 64S/32Q/32D; Singles – Doubles	(United States) Betsy Nagelsen (United States) Martina Navratilova; 6–4, 6–4	(United States) Ann Kiyomura (United States) Candy Reynolds	(United States) Martina Navratilova (Socialist Federal Republic of Yugoslavia) Mima Jaušovec	(South Africa) Greer Stevens (United States) Pam Shriver (Romania) Virginia Ruzici (United States) Candy Reynolds

=== December ===
Week	Tournament	Champions	Runners-up	Semifinalists	Quarterfinalists
1 Dec	NSW Building Society Open; Sydney, Australia; Colgate Series (AAA); Grass – $125,000 – 56S/32D	(Australia) Wendy Turnbull; 3–6, 6–4, 7–6^{(10–8)}	(United States) Pam Shriver	(West Germany) Sylvia Hanika (Czechoslovakia) Hana Mandlíková	(United States) Martina Navratilova (South Africa) Greer Stevens (United Kingdom) Sue Barker (Romania) Virginia Ruzici
1 Dec	NSW Building Society Open; Sydney, Australia; Colgate Series (AAA); Grass – $125,000 – 56S/32D	(United States) Pam Shriver (Netherlands) Betty Stöve; 6–1, 4–6, 6–4	(United States) Rosie Casals (Australia) Wendy Turnbull	(West Germany) Sylvia Hanika (Czechoslovakia) Hana Mandlíková	(United States) Martina Navratilova (South Africa) Greer Stevens (United Kingdom) Sue Barker (Romania) Virginia Ruzici
8 Dec	National Panasonic South Australian Open; Adelaide, Australia; Colgate Series (AAA); Grass – $125,000 – 56S/32D	(Czechoslovakia) Hana Mandlíková; 6–2, 6–4	(United Kingdom) Sue Barker	(Netherlands) Betty Stöve (Hungary) Marie Pinterová	(West Germany) Bettina Bunge (West Germany) Claudia Kohde-Kilsch (West Germany) Bettina Bunge (Australia) Amanda Tobin
8 Dec	National Panasonic South Australian Open; Adelaide, Australia; Colgate Series (AAA); Grass – $125,000 – 56S/32D	(United States) Pam Shriver (Netherlands) Betty Stöve; 6–4, 6–3	(United Kingdom) Sue Barker (United States) Sharon Walsh	(Netherlands) Betty Stöve (Hungary) Marie Pinterová	(West Germany) Bettina Bunge (West Germany) Claudia Kohde-Kilsch (West Germany) Bettina Bunge (Australia) Amanda Tobin
15 Dec	Tucson Open; Tucson, United States; Colgate Series (A); Carpet (i) – $75,000 – 32S/16D	(United States) Tracy Austin; 6–2, 6–0	(United States) Mareen Louie Harper	(United States) Barbara Potter (United States) Sandy Collins	(United States) Sherry Acker (United States) JoAnne Russell (United States) Wendy White (United States) Mona Guerrant
15 Dec	Tucson Open; Tucson, United States; Colgate Series (A); Carpet (i) – $75,000 – 32S/16D	(United States) Leslie Allen (United States) Barbara Potter; 7–6, 6–0	(United States) Mary Lou Daniels (United States) Wendy White	(United States) Barbara Potter (United States) Sandy Collins	(United States) Sherry Acker (United States) JoAnne Russell (United States) Wendy White (United States) Mona Guerrant
6 Jan 1981	Colgate Series Championships; Landover, United States; WTA Championships; Hard (i) – $250,000 – 12S/6D	(United States) Tracy Austin; 6–2, 6–2	(United States) Andrea Jaeger	(Australia) Wendy Turnbull (United States) Martina Navratilova	Round robin (Czechoslovakia) Hana Mandlíková (Romania) Virginia Ruzici (United States) Chris Evert-Lloyd (United States) Pam Shriver
6 Jan 1981	Colgate Series Championships; Landover, United States; WTA Championships; Hard (i) – $250,000 – 12S/6D	(United States) Rosie Casals (Australia) Wendy Turnbull; 6–3, 4–6, 7–6^{(7–5)}	(United States) Paula Smith (United States) Candy Reynolds	(Australia) Wendy Turnbull (United States) Martina Navratilova	Round robin (Czechoslovakia) Hana Mandlíková (Romania) Virginia Ruzici (United States) Chris Evert-Lloyd (United States) Pam Shriver

== Rankings ==
Below are the 1980 WTA year-end rankings (December 31, 1980) in singles competition:

Singles Year-end Ranking
No	Player Name	Points	1979	Change
1	Chris Evert (USA)	16.829	2	▲1
2	Tracy Austin (USA)	15.633	3	▲1
3	Martina Navratilova (USA)	14.786	1	▼2
4	Hana Mandlíková (TCH)	10.801	17	▲13
5	Evonne Goolagong Cawley (AUS)	10.747	4	▼1
6	Billie Jean King (USA)	9.737	5	▼1
7	Andrea Jaeger (USA)	9.611	NR	NR
8	Wendy Turnbull (AUS)	9.556	7	▼1
9	Pam Shriver (USA)	8.227	33	▲24
10	Greer Stevens (RSA)	8.032	12	▲2
11	Virginia Ruzici (ROU)	7.598	13	▲2
12	Dianne Fromholtz (AUS)	7.571	6	▼6
13	Kathy Jordan (USA)	7.281	11	▼2
14	Sylvia Hanika (FRG)	6.248	16	▲2
15	Virginia Wade (GBR)	5.766	8	▼7
16	Sue Barker (GBR)	5.460	10	▼6
17	Mima Jaušovec (YUG)	5.284	20	▲3
18	Regina Maršíková (TCH)	5.127	14	▼4
19	Bettina Bunge (FRG)	4.960	32	▲13
20	Terry Holladay (USA)	4.551	26	▲6

== See also ==
- 1980 Men's Grand Prix circuit
- Women's Tennis Association
- International Tennis Federation
