= 1980 U.S. Clay Court Championships – Men's doubles =

Men's doubles
- 1980 U.S. Clay Court Championships

Final
- Champions: (South Africa) Kevin Curren (United States) Steve Denton
- Runners-up: (Poland) Wojciech Fibak (Czechoslovakia) Ivan Lendl
- Score: 3–6, 7–6, 6–4

Events
Singles	men	women
Doubles	men	women
← 1979 ·	U.S. Clay Court Championships	· 1981 →

Eighth-seeds Kevin Curren and Steve Denton won the title and shared $10,600 after beating Wojciech Fibak and Ivan Lendl in the final.

== Seeds ==
A champion seed is indicated in bold text while text in italics indicates the round in which that seed was eliminated.

1. (Chile) Hans Gildemeister / (Ecuador) Andrés Gómez (first round)
2. (Poland) Wojciech Fibak / (Czechoslovakia) Ivan Lendl (final)
3. (United States) Victor Amaya / (United States) Hank Pfister (quarterfinals)
4. (United States) Mike Cahill / (Switzerland) Colin Dowdeswell (first round)
5. (Czechoslovakia) Jan Kodeš / (Mexico) Raúl Ramírez (quarterfinals)
6. (Australia) Mark Edmondson / (Australia) Kim Warwick (quarterfinals)
7. (United States) Terry Moor / (United States) Eliot Teltscher (semifinals)
8. (South Africa) **Kevin Curren / (United States) Steve Denton (champions)**

== Draw ==
=== Key ===
- Q = Qualifier
- WC = Wild card
- LL = Lucky loser
- Alt = Alternate
- SE = Special exempt
- PR = Protected ranking
- ITF = ITF entry
- JE = Junior exempt
- w/o = Walkover
- r = Retired
- d = Defaulted
- SR = Special ranking

=== Finals ===
Semifinals
8	**(South Africa) Kevin Curren** **(United States) Steve Denton**	3	**6**	**6**
(Argentina) Carlos Gattiker (Peru) Fernando Maynetto	**6**	3	4
7	(United States) Terry Moor (United States) Eliot Teltscher	5	1
2	**(Poland) Wojciech Fibak** **(Czechoslovakia) Ivan Lendl**	**7**	**6**

Final
8	**(South Africa) Kevin Curren** **(United States) Steve Denton**	3	**7**	**6**
2	(Poland) Wojciech Fibak (Czechoslovakia) Ivan Lendl	**6**	6	4

=== Top half ===
First round
1	(Chile) H Gildemeister (Ecuador) A Gómez	1	**7**	3
**(Australia) C Dibley** **(Australia) J James**	**6**	6	**6**
**(Australia) S Ball** **(Australia) P Dent**	**6**	**6**
(United States) G Holroyd (United States) J Van Linge	4	4
**(Chile) Á Fillol** **(Chile) J Fillol**	**6**	**6**
(Argentina) F Dalla Fontana (Argentina) A Gattiker	1	3
(Sweden) P Hjertquist (Sweden) S Simonsson	4	6
8	**(South Africa) K Curren** **(United States) S Denton**	**6**	**7**
4	(United States) M Cahill (Switzerland) C Dowdeswell	6	4
**(Argentina) C Gattiker** **(Peru) F Maynetto**	**7**	**6**
**(United States) G Hardie** **(United States) B Martin**	**7**	**6**
(United States) B Nealon (United States) B Willenborg	6	1
**(Spain) J Higueras** **(United States) V Winitsky**	**6**	**7**
(Australia) R Case (Australia) G Masters	4	5
(Israel) S Glickstein (Sweden) J Norbäck	3	1
5	**(Czechoslovakia) J Kodeš** **(Mexico) R Ramírez**	**6**	**6**

Second round
**(Australia) C Dibley** **(Australia) J James**	**7**	6	**6**
(Australia) S Ball (Australia) P Dent	6	**7**	2
(Chile) Á Fillol (Chile) J Fillol	3	6
8	**(South Africa) K Curren** **(United States) S Denton**	**6**	**7**
**(Argentina) C Gattiker** **(Peru) F Maynetto**	**6**	**7**
(United States) G Hardie (United States) B Martin	3	6
(Spain) J Higueras (United States) V Winitsky	5	0
5	**(Czechoslovakia) J Kodeš** **(Mexico) R Ramírez**	**7**	**6**

Quarterfinals
(Australia) C Dibley (Australia) J James	6	r
8	**(South Africa) K Curren** **(United States) S Denton**	**7**
**(Argentina) C Gattiker** **(Peru) F Maynetto**	**6**	**6**
5	(Czechoslovakia) J Kodeš (Mexico) R Ramírez	4	3

Semifinals
8	**(South Africa) K Curren** **(United States) S Denton**	3	**6**	**6**
(Argentina) C Gattiker (Peru) F Maynetto	**6**	3	4

=== Bottom half ===
First round
7	**(United States) T Moor** **(United States) E Teltscher**	3	**7**	**8**
(Australia) J Fitzgerald (Australia) P Kronk	**6**	6	6
**(Australia) W Maher** **(Mexico) E Montaño**	**6**	**6**
(United States) T Garcia (United States) M Grant	3	1
**(United States) M Dickson** **(United States) M Gandolfo**	**6**	**7**
(Australia) D Carter (Australia) A Gardiner	3	5
(Czechoslovakia) S Birner (Argentina) R Cano	2	**7**	4
3	**(United States) V Amaya** **(United States) H Pfister**	**6**	5	**6**
6	**(Australia) M Edmondson** **(Australia) K Warwick**	**6**	**6**
(India) R Krishnan (Spain) G Urpí	2	3
**(Socialist Federal Republic of Yugoslavia) Ž Franulović** **(United Kingdom) J Lloyd**	5	**6**	**6**
(Argentina) G Aubone (Chile) J Núñez	**7**	4	4
**(Finland) L Palin** **(United Kingdom) M Wayman**	5	**7**	**8**
(United States) C Strode (United States) M Strode	**7**	6	6
(Brazil) J Soares (Ecuador) R Ycaza	0	2
2	**(Poland) W Fibak** **(Czechoslovakia) I Lendl**	**6**	**6**

Second round
7	**(United States) T Moor** **(United States) E Teltscher**	**7**	**6**
(Australia) W Maher (Mexico) E Montaño	5	3
(United States) M Dickson (United States) M Gandolfo	4	1
3	**(United States) V Amaya** **(United States) H Pfister**	**6**	**6**
6	**(Australia) M Edmondson** **(Australia) K Warwick**	**6**	**6**
(Socialist Federal Republic of Yugoslavia) Ž Franulović (United Kingdom) J Lloyd	3	2
(Finland) L Palin (United Kingdom) M Wayman
2	**(Poland) W Fibak** **(Czechoslovakia) I Lendl**	w/o

Quarterfinals
7	**(United States) T Moor** **(United States) E Teltscher**	3	**7**	**6**
3	(United States) V Amaya (United States) H Pfister	**6**	5	3
6	(Australia) M Edmondson (Australia) K Warwick	4	**6**	4
2	**(Poland) W Fibak** **(Czechoslovakia) I Lendl**	**6**	2	**6**

Semifinals
7	(United States) T Moor (United States) E Teltscher	5	1
2	**(Poland) W Fibak** **(Czechoslovakia) I Lendl**	**7**	**6**
