= 1979 U.S. Clay Court Championships – Women's singles =

Women's singles
- 1979 U.S. Clay Court Championships

Final
- Champion: (United States) Chris Evert-Lloyd
- Runner-up: (Australia) Evonne Goolagong Cawley
- Score: 6–4, 6–3

Details
- Draw: 48
- Seeds: 8

Events
Singles	men	women
Doubles	men	women
← 1978 ·	U.S. Clay Court Championships	· 1980 →

Top-seed Chris Evert-Lloyd won the title beating third-seed Evonne Goolagong Cawley in the final for a first-prize of $20,000. It was Evert-Lloyd's fifth title at the U.S. Clay Courts and followed an absence of three years during which World Team Tennis commitments clashed with the event.

== Seeds ==
A champion seed is indicated in bold text while text in italics indicates the round in which that seed was eliminated.

1. (United States) **Chris Evert-Lloyd (champion)**
2. (Australia) Kerry Reid (third round)
3. (Australia) Evonne Goolagong Cawley (final)
4. (Romania) Virginia Ruzici (quarterfinals)
5. (Czechoslovakia) Regina Maršíková (semifinals)
6. (United States) Kathy Jordan (second round)
7. (United States) Stacy Margolin (second round)
8. (United States) Caroline Stoll (third round)

== Draw ==
=== Key ===
- Q = Qualifier
- WC = Wild card
- LL = Lucky loser
- Alt = Alternate
- SE = Special exempt
- PR = Protected ranking
- ITF = ITF entry
- JE = Junior exempt
- w/o = Walkover
- r = Retired
- d = Defaulted
- SR = Special ranking

=== Finals ===
Quarterfinals
1	**(United States) Chris Evert-Lloyd**	6	**6**	**6**
(Socialist Federal Republic of Yugoslavia) Mima Jaušovec	**7**	2	3
4	(Romania) Virginia Ruzici	5	1
**(United States) Renée Richards**	**7**	**6**
(United States) Anne Smith	4	**6**	3
3	**(Australia) Evonne Goolagong Cawley**	**6**	3	**6**
5	**(Czechoslovakia) Regina Maršíková**	**6**	**6**
(United States) Jeanne DuVall	2	3

Semifinals
1	**(United States) Chris Evert-Lloyd**	**6**	**6**
(United States) Renée Richards	1	0
3	**(Australia) Evonne Goolagong Cawley**	4	**6**	**7**
5	(Czechoslovakia) Regina Maršíková	**6**	3	5

Final
1	**(United States) Chris Evert-Lloyd**	**6**	**6**
3	(Australia) Evonne Goolagong Cawley	4	3

=== Top half ===
==== Section 1 ====
First round
1	**(United States) C Evert-Lloyd**	**6**	**6**
(United States) P Smith	1	0
(United States) L Forood	3	**6**	1
**(Czechoslovakia) R Tomanová**	**6**	2	**6**
**(United States) S Acker**	**6**	**6**
(Sweden) M Wikstedt	3	4
(United States) R Blount	1	2
**(Socialist Federal Republic of Yugoslavia) M Jaušovec**	**6**	**6**

Second round
1	**(United States) C Evert-Lloyd**	**6**	**7**
(United States) W White	2	5
(United States) B Jordan	2	**6**	1
**(Czechoslovakia) R Tomanová**	**6**	4	**6**
(United States) B Hallquist	2	2
**(United States) S Acker**	**6**	**6**
**(Socialist Federal Republic of Yugoslavia) M Jaušovec**	**6**	**6**
6	(United States) K Jordan	1	2

Third round
1	**(United States) C Evert-Lloyd**	4	**6**	**6**
(Czechoslovakia) R Tomanová	**6**	1	2
(United States) S Acker	1	2
**(Socialist Federal Republic of Yugoslavia) M Jaušovec**	**6**	**6**

Quarterfinals
1	**(United States) C Evert-Lloyd**	6	**6**	**6**
(Socialist Federal Republic of Yugoslavia) M Jaušovec	**7**	2	3

==== Section 2 ====
First round
(United States) P Louie	0	1
Q	**(United States) J Portman**	**6**	**6**
**(United States) J Russell**	4	**7**	**6**
(United States) R Gerulaitis	**6**	6	4
Q	**(Australia) K Hallam**	**6**	**6**
Q	(United States) L Doherty	3	1
LL	(Australia) S Saliba	2	0
7	**(United States) S Margolin**	**6**	**6**

Second round
4	**(Romania) V Ruzici**	**7**	**6**
Q	(United States) J Portman	5	1
**(United States) J Russell**	**6**	3	**6**
(United States) M-L Piatek	3	**6**	2
Q	**(Australia) K Hallam**	**7**	**6**
(United States) L Siegel	5	1
**(United States) R Richards**	**6**	**6**
7	(United States) S Margolin	2	2

Third round
4	**(Romania) V Ruzici**	6	**7**	**6**
(United States) J Russell	**7**	6	2
Q	(Australia) K Hallam	2	0
**(United States) R Richards**	**6**	**6**

Quarterfinals
4	(Romania) V Ruzici	5	1
**(United States) R Richards**	**7**	**6**

=== Bottom half ===
==== Section 3 ====
First round
8	**(United States) C Stoll**	**6**	**6**
(New Zealand) J Chaloner	0	2
(Australia) C O'Neil	5	3
**(United States) A Smith**	**7**	**6**
(United States) M Carillo	2	**6**	2
**(United States) L duPont**	**6**	4	**6**
Q	(United States) T Lewis	2	0
3	**(Australia) E Goolagong Cawley**	**6**	**6**

Second round
8	**(United States) C Stoll**	**6**	**6**
(Australia) D Evers	3	2
(Argentina) I Madruga	**6**	5	3
**(United States) A Smith**	3	**7**	**6**
(United States) L duPont	2	3
**(United States) D Gilbert**	**6**	**6**
(United States) B Nagelsen	0	1
3	**(Australia) E Goolagong Cawley**	**6**	**6**

Third round
8	(United States) C Stoll	**6**	6	2
**(United States) A Smith**	3	**7**	**6**
(United States) D Gilbert	2	1
3	**(Australia) E Goolagong Cawley**	**6**	**6**

Quarterfinals
(United States) A Smith	4	**6**	3
3	**(Australia) E Goolagong Cawley**	**6**	3	**6**

==== Section 4 ====
First round
**(United States) K Latham**	4	**6**	**6**
(United States) J Newberry	**6**	2	3
**(Argentina) E Raponi**	**6**	5	**6**
(United States) L Allen	2	**7**	1
**(Argentina) V González**	**6**	**7**
(United States) N Yeargin	2	5
(United States) L Tuero	2	**6**	2
**(United States) D Desfor**	**6**	2	**6**

Second round
5	**(Czechoslovakia) R Maršíková**	**6**	**6**
(United States) K Latham	1	3
(United States) Z Liess	2	3
**(Argentina) E Raponi**	**6**	**6**
**(United States) J DuVall**	**6**	**7**
(Argentina) V González	4	5
(United States) D Desfor	6	**7**	3
2	**(Australia) K Reid**	**7**	5	**6**

Third round
5	**(Czechoslovakia) R Maršíková**	**6**	**7**
(Argentina) E Raponi	4	6
**(United States) J DuVall**	w/o
2	(Australia) K Reid

Quarterfinals
5	**(Czechoslovakia) R Maršíková**	**6**	**6**
(United States) J DuVall	2	3
