= 1979 U.S. Clay Court Championships – Women's doubles =

Women's doubles
- 1979 U.S. Clay Court Championships

Final
- Champions: (United States) Kathy Jordan (United States) Anne Smith
- Runners-up: (United States) Penny Johnson (United States) Paula Smith
- Score: 6–1, 6–0

Events
Singles	men	women
Doubles	men	women
← 1978 ·	U.S. Clay Court Championships	· 1980 →

Third-seeded pair Kathy Jordan and Anne Smith won the title after defeating Penny Johnson and Paula Smith in the final.

== Seeds ==
A champion seed is indicated in bold text while text in italics indicates the round in which that seed was eliminated.

1. (Australia) Evonne Goolagong-Cawley / (Australia) Kerry Reid (withdrew — Reid calf injury)
2. (Socialist Federal Republic of Yugoslavia) Mima Jaušovec / (Czechoslovakia) Renáta Tomanová (semifinals)
3. (United States) **Kathy Jordan / (United States) Anne Smith (champions)**
4. (United States) Diane Desfor / (United States) Barbara Hallquist (semifinals)
5. (United States) Sherry Acker / (United States) Renée Richards (second round)
6. (Czechoslovakia) Regina Maršíková / (Romania) Virginia Ruzici (quarterfinals)
7. (South Africa) Brigitte Cuypers / (United States) Laura duPont (quarterfinals)
8. (United States) Betsy Nagelsen / (United States) Janet Newberry (quarterfinals)

== Draw ==
=== Key ===
- Q = Qualifier
- WC = Wild card
- LL = Lucky loser
- Alt = Alternate
- SE = Special exempt
- PR = Protected ranking
- ITF = ITF entry
- JE = Junior exempt
- w/o = Walkover
- r = Retired
- d = Defaulted
- SR = Special ranking

=== Finals ===
Semifinals
**(United States) Penny Johnson** **(United States) Paula Smith**	**7**	**7**
4	(United States) Diane Desfor (United States) Barbara Hallquist	6	5
3	**(United States) Kathy Jordan** **(United States) Anne Smith**	**6**	**7**
2	(Socialist Federal Republic of Yugoslavia) Mima Jaušovec (Czechoslovakia) Renáta Tomanová	4	5

Final
(United States) Penny Johnson (United States) Paula Smith	1	0
3	**(United States) Kathy Jordan** **(United States) Anne Smith**	**6**	**6**

=== Top half ===
First round
Alt	(Australia) W Gilchrist (New Zealand) B Perry	**6**	4	1
**(United States) P Johnson** **(United States) P Smith**	2	**6**	**6**
(Australia) C O'Neil (Sweden) M Wikstedt	**7**	2	2
6	**(Czechoslovakia) R Maršíková** **(Romania) V Ruzici**	5	**6**	**6**
**(United States) L Forood** **(United States) J Russell**	**6**	**6**
(United States) Sandy Stap (United States) Sue Stap	2	1
(United States) M Carillo (United States) S Margolin	4	6
**(New Zealand) J Chaloner** **(United States) N Weigel**	**6**	**7**

Second round
**(United States) P Johnson** **(United States) P Smith**	**7**	**6**
(Australia) D Evers (Australia) K Hallam	5	3
(Argentina) V González (Argentina) E Raponi	5	**6**	3
6	**(Czechoslovakia) R Maršíková** **(Romania) V Ruzici**	**7**	4	**6**
4	**(United States) D Desfor** **(United States) B Hallquist**	**6**	**6**
(United States) L Forood (United States) J Russell	3	1
(New Zealand) J Chaloner (United States) N Weigel	3	4
8	**(United States) B Nagelsen** **(United States) J Newberry**	**6**	**6**

Quarterfinals
**(United States) P Johnson** **(United States) P Smith**	**7**	6	**6**
6	(Czechoslovakia) R Maršíková (Romania) V Ruzici	5	**7**	3
4	**(United States) D Desfor** **(United States) B Hallquist**	**7**	6	**6**
8	(United States) B Nagelsen (United States) J Newberry	5	**7**	3

Semifinals
**(United States) P Johnson** **(United States) P Smith**	**7**	**7**
4	(United States) D Desfor (United States) B Hallquist	6	5

=== Bottom half ===
First round
5	**(United States) S Acker** **(United States) R Richards**	**6**	**6**
(United States) T Lewis (United States) S McInerney	0	1
(United States) B Jordan (Australia) K Ruddell	3	5
**(United States) K Latham** **(United States) L Siegel**	**6**	**7**
(United States) R Blount (United States) C Stoll	3	**6**	4
**(Australia) L Harrison** **(United States) D Morrison**	**6**	3	**6**
(United States) D Gilbert (United States) M L Piatek	3	1
2	**(Socialist Federal Republic of Yugoslavia) M Jaušovec** **(Czechoslovakia) R Tomanová**	**6**	**6**

Second round
5	(United States) S Acker (United States) R Richards	**6**	3	4
**(United States) L Allen** **(United States) P Louie**	3	**6**	**6**
(United States) K Latham (United States) L Siegel	1	0
3	**(United States) K Jordan** **(United States) A Smith**	**6**	**6**
7	**(South Africa) B Cuypers** **(United States) L duPont**	3	**6**	**7**
(Australia) L Harrison (United States) D Morrison	**6**	2	5
(United States) W White (United States) N Yeargin	2	2
2	**(Socialist Federal Republic of Yugoslavia) M Jaušovec** **(Czechoslovakia) R Tomanová**	**6**	**6**

Quarterfinals
(United States) L Allen (United States) P Louie	0	2
3	**(United States) K Jordan** **(United States) A Smith**	**6**	**6**
7	(South Africa) B Cuypers (United States) L duPont	3	1
2	**(Socialist Federal Republic of Yugoslavia) M Jaušovec** **(Czechoslovakia) R Tomanová**	**6**	**6**

Semifinals
3	**(United States) K Jordan** **(United States) A Smith**	**6**	**7**
2	(Socialist Federal Republic of Yugoslavia) M Jaušovec (Czechoslovakia) R Tomanová	4	5
