= 1980 U.S. Clay Court Championships =

- Date: August 4–10
- Edition: 12th
- Draw: 64S / 32D (M); 56S / 28D (W)
- Prize money: $350,000
- Surface: Clay (green) / outdoor
- Location: Indianapolis, Indiana, U.S.
- Venue: Indianapolis Sports Center

Champions

Men's singles
- (Argentina) José Luis Clerc

Women's singles
- (United States) Chris Evert-Lloyd

Men's doubles
- (South Africa) Kevin Curren / (United States) Steve Denton

Women's doubles
- (United States) Anne Smith / (United States) Paula Smith
← 1979 ·	U.S. Clay Court Championships	· 1981 →

The 1980 U.S. Clay Court Championships was a men's Grand Prix and women's Colgate Series tennis tournament held at the Indianapolis Sports Center in Indianapolis in the United States and played on outdoor clay courts. It was the 12th edition of the tournament and was held from August 4 through August 10, 1980. Eighth-seeded José Luis Clerc and top-seeded Chris Evert-Lloyd won the singles titles.

== Finals ==
=== Men's singles ===
(Argentina) José Luis Clerc defeated (United States) Mel Purcell 7–5, 6–3

- It was Clerc's 3rd singles title of the year and the 7th of his career.

=== Women's singles ===
(United States) Chris Evert-Lloyd defeated (United States) Andrea Jaeger 6–4, 6–3

- It was Evert-Lloyd's 4th singles title of the year and the 97th of her career.

=== Men's doubles ===
(South Africa) Kevin Curren / (United States) Steve Denton defeated (Poland) Wojciech Fibak / (Czechoslovakia) Ivan Lendl 3–6, 7–6, 6–4

- It was Curren's 2nd title of the year and of his career. It was also Denton's 2nd title of the year and of his career.

=== Women's doubles ===
(United States) Anne Smith / (United States) Paula Smith defeated (Romania) Virginia Ruzici / (Czechoslovakia) Renáta Tomanová 4–6, 6–3, 6–4

- It was Anne Smith's 6th title of the year and the 12th of her career. It was Paula Smith's 1st title of the year and of her career.
