= 1981 U.S. Clay Court Championships – Women's singles =

Women's singles
- 1981 U.S. Clay Court Championships

Final
- Champion: (United States) Andrea Jaeger
- Runner-up: (Romania) Virginia Ruzici
- Score: 6–1, 6–0

Details
- Draw: 56
- Seeds: 14

Events
Singles	men	women
Doubles	men	women
← 1980 ·	U.S. Clay Court Championships	· 1982 →

Top-seed Andrea Jaeger won the final and $27,500 first prize money by defeating second-seeded Virginia Ruzici in the final.

== Seeds ==
The top eight seeds received a bye into the second round. A champion seed is indicated in bold text while text in italics indicates the round in which that seed was eliminated.

1. (United States) Andrea Jaeger **(champion)**
2. (Romania) Virginia Ruzici (final)
3. (Socialist Federal Republic of Yugoslavia) Mima Jaušovec (semifinals)
4. (Czechoslovakia) Regina Maršíková (semifinals)
5. (Australia) Dianne Fromholtz (second round)
6. (United Kingdom) Sue Barker (quarterfinals)
7. (United States) JoAnne Russell (third round)
8. (United States) Anne Smith (quarterfinals)
9. (United States) Mary Lou Piatek (second round)
10. (United States) Sandy Collins (first round)
11. (United States) Anne White (second round)
12. (United States) Kathleen Horvath (second round)
13. (United States) Pam Casale (third round)
14. (United States) Kathy Rinaldi (third round)

== Draw ==
=== Key ===
- Q = Qualifier
- WC = Wild card
- LL = Lucky loser
- Alt = Alternate
- SE = Special exempt
- PR = Protected ranking
- ITF = ITF entry
- JE = Junior exempt
- w/o = Walkover
- r = Retired
- d = Defaulted
- SR = Special ranking

=== Finals ===
Quarterfinals
1	**(United States) Andrea Jaeger**	**6**	6	**6**
6	(United Kingdom) Sue Barker	1	**7**	2
3	**(Socialist Federal Republic of Yugoslavia) Mima Jaušovec**	4	**6**	**7**
8	(United States) Anne Smith	**6**	1	5
(Switzerland) Hana Strachoňová	3	1
4	**(Czechoslovakia) Regina Maršíková**	**6**	**6**
(United States) Susan Mascarin	3	**6**	5
2	**(Romania) Virginia Ruzici**	**6**	0	**7**

Semifinals
1	**(United States) Andrea Jaeger**	**6**	**6**
3	(Socialist Federal Republic of Yugoslavia) Mima Jaušovec	3	1
4	(Czechoslovakia) Regina Maršíková	6	0
2	**(Romania) Virginia Ruzici**	**7**	**6**

Final
1	**(United States) Andrea Jaeger**	**6**	**6**
2	(Romania) Virginia Ruzici	1	0

=== Top half ===
==== Section 1 ====
First round
(United States) K Sands	4	2
Q	**(United States) D Rubin**	**6**	**6**
**(United States) R Richards**	**6**	**6**
(Hungary) M Pinterová	2	2
(United Kingdom) D Jevans	1	2
11	**(United States) A White**	**6**	**6**
Q	(United States) L Doherty	2	5
**(Czechoslovakia) R Tomanová**	**6**	**7**
**(Czechoslovakia) K Skronská**	**6**	4	**6**
(United States) A Henricksson	3	**6**	2
(United States) K Jones	**6**	5	2
**(Czechoslovakia) Y Brzáková**	2	**7**	**6**

Second round
1	**(United States) A Jaeger**	**6**	**6**
Q	(United States) D Rubin	0	1
**(United States) R Richards**	4	**6**	**6**
11	(United States) A White	**6**	2	1
**(Czechoslovakia) R Tomanová**	**6**	4	**6**
(Czechoslovakia) K Skronská	2	**6**	3
(Czechoslovakia) Y Brzáková	4	1
6	**(United Kingdom) S Barker**	**6**	**6**

Third round
1	**(United States) A Jaeger**	**6**	**6**
(United States) R Richards	3	0
(Czechoslovakia) R Tomanová	4	**7**	4
6	**(United Kingdom) S Barker**	**6**	6	**6**

Quarterfinals
1	**(United States) A Jaeger**	**6**	6	**6**
6	(United Kingdom) S Barker	1	**7**	2

==== Section 2 ====
First round
(United States) S Jaeger	2	1
**(United States) J DuVall**	**6**	**6**
Q	(United States) F Raschiatore	2	0
**(Peru) P Vásquez**	**6**	**6**
**(United States) A-M Fernandez**	**6**	**6**
10	(United States) S Collins	1	2
14	**(United States) K Rinaldi**	**6**	**6**
Q	(United States) Cissie Donigan	1	3
Q	**(United States) E Burgin**	**6**	**6**
(South Africa) R Fairbank	2	3
Q	**(United States) K Steinmetz**	**6**	**6**
(United Kingdom) G Coles	1	3

Second round
3	**(Socialist Federal Republic of Yugoslavia) M Jaušovec**	**6**	**6**
(United States) J DuVall	2	4
**(Peru) P Vásquez**	**6**	**6**
(United States) A-M Fernandez	4	1
14	**(United States) K Rinaldi**	**6**	**6**
Q	(United States) E Burgin	2	2
Q	(United States) K Steinmetz	1	3
8	**(United States) A Smith**	**6**	**6**

Third round
3	**(Socialist Federal Republic of Yugoslavia) M Jaušovec**	**6**	**6**
(Peru) P Vásquez	3	3
14	(United States) K Rinaldi	4	4
8	**(United States) A Smith**	**6**	**6**

Quarterfinals
3	**(Socialist Federal Republic of Yugoslavia) M Jaušovec**	4	**6**	**7**
8	(United States) A Smith	**6**	1	5

=== Bottom half ===
==== Section 3 ====
First round
**(United States) B Norton**	**6**	**6**
(United States) L duPont	3	3
**(Switzerland) H Strachoňová**	4	**6**	**6**
(United States) D Gilbert	**6**	0	2
LL	(Australia) B Remilton	5	0
12	**(United States) K Horvath**	**7**	**6**
**(Australia) D Freeman**	3	**6**	**7**
(United States) A Moulton	**6**	2	5
(United States) P Smith	5	2
**(United States) V Nelson**	**7**	**6**
**(United States) K Cummings**	**6**	**6**
(Australia) N Gregory	2	3

Second round
5	(Australia) D Fromholtz	5	1
**(United States) B Norton**	**7**	**6**
**(Switzerland) H Strachoňová**	**6**	**6**
12	(United States) K Horvath	2	1
(Australia) D Freeman	2	4
**(United States) V Nelson**	**6**	**6**
(United States) K Cummings	2	1
4	**(Czechoslovakia) R Maršíková**	**6**	**6**

Third round
(United States) B Norton	**6**	6	1
**(Switzerland) H Strachoňová**	2	**7**	**6**
(United States) V Nelson	2	1
4	**(Czechoslovakia) R Maršíková**	**6**	**6**

Quarterfinals
(Switzerland) H Strachoňová	3	1
4	**(Czechoslovakia) R Maršíková**	**6**	**6**

==== Section 4 ====
First round
**(United States) K Keil**	5	**7**	**6**
(Czechoslovakia) I Budařová	**7**	6	2
(South Korea) L Duk-hee	4	**6**	1
**(United States) S Mascarin**	**6**	3	**6**
(South Africa) Y Vermaak	**6**	6	2
9	**(United States) M L Piatek**	1	**7**	**6**
13	**(United States) P Casale**	**6**	**6**
(Australia) S Saliba	2	1
**(United States) B Jordan**	**6**	**6**
Q	(United States) H Ludloff	3	2
(United States) J Portman	1	1
**(Brazil) P Medrado**	**6**	**6**

Second round
7	**(United States) J Russell**	4	**6**	**6**
(United States) K Keil	**6**	2	1
**(United States) S Mascarin**	**6**	5	**6**
9	(United States) M L Piatek	4	**7**	1
13	**(United States) P Casale**	**6**	**6**
(United States) B Jordan	0	2
(Brazil) P Medrado	3	4
2	**(Romania) V Ruzici**	**6**	**6**

Third round
7	(United States) J Russell	5	5
**(United States) S Mascarin**	**7**	**7**
13	(United States) P Casale	5	1
2	**(Romania) V Ruzici**	**7**	**6**

Quarterfinals
(United States) S Mascarin	3	**6**	5
2	**(Romania) V Ruzici**	**6**	0	**7**
