= 1980 U.S. Clay Court Championships – Men's singles =

Men's singles
- 1980 U.S. Clay Court Championships

Final
- Champion: (Argentina) José Luis Clerc
- Runner-up: (United States) Mel Purcell
- Score: 7–5, 6–3

Details
- Draw: 64
- Seeds: 16

Events
Singles	men	women
Doubles	men	women
- U.S. Clay Court Championships

Eighth-seed José Luis Clerc claimed the title and first prize money of $28,000 by defeating qualifier Mel Purcell in the final.

== Seeds ==
A champion seed is indicated in bold text while text in italics indicates the round in which that seed was eliminated.

1. (United States) Gene Mayer (third round)
2. (United States) Harold Solomon (third round)
3. (United States) Eddie Dibbs (quarterfinals)
4. (Czechoslovakia) Ivan Lendl (second round)
5. (Spain) José Higueras (semifinals)
6. (Poland) Wojciech Fibak (quarterfinals)
7. (Chile) Hans Gildemeister (first round)
8. (Argentina) **José Luis Clerc (champion)**
9. (United States) Victor Amaya (second round)
10. (United States) Eliot Teltscher (quarterfinals)
11. (Mexico) Raúl Ramírez (first round)
12. (Australia) Phil Dent (second round)
13. (Australia) Kim Warwick (third round)
14. (United States) Hank Pfister (second round)
15. (Australia) Colin Dibley (first round)
16. (United States) Terry Moor (quarterfinals)

== Draw ==
Key

- Q = Qualifier
- WC = Wild card
- LL = Lucky loser
- Alt = Alternate
- ITF = ITF entry
- PR = Protected ranking
- SR = Special ranking
- SE = Special exempt
- JE = Junior exempt
- JR = Junior Accelerator Programme entrant
- CO = College Accelerator Programme entrant
- NG = Next Gen Accelerator Program entrant
- w/o = Walkover
- r = Retired
- d = Defaulted

=== Finals ===
Quarterfinals
15	(United States) Terry Moor	3	0
8	**(Argentina) José Luis Clerc**	**6**	**6**
10	(United States) Eliot Teltscher	3	**6**	3
5	**(Spain) José Higueras**	**6**	4	**6**
**(Bolivia) Mario Martinez**	**7**	**6**
3	(United States) Eddie Dibbs	6	2
6	(Poland) Wojciech Fibak	1	3
Q	**(United States) Mel Purcell**	**6**	**6**

Semifinals
8	**(Argentina) José Luis Clerc**	**6**	**6**
5	(Spain) José Higueras	2	1
(Bolivia) Mario Martinez	1	3
Q	**(United States) Mel Purcell**	**6**	**6**

Final
8	**(Argentina) José Luis Clerc**	**7**	**6**
Q	(United States) Mel Purcell	5	3

=== Top half ===
==== Section 1 ====
First round
1	**(United States) G Mayer**	**6**	**6**
(United States) L Shiras	1	0
Q	**(Chile) J Núñez**	**6**	**6**
(Australia) S Ball	3	1
**(Finland) L Palin**	**6**	**7**
(Colombia) Á Betancur	4	6
(United States) B Nealon	2	2
16	**(United States) T Moor**	**6**	**6**
13	**(Australia) K Warwick**	**6**	**6**
(Israel) S Glickstein	2	3
**(Peru) F Maynetto**	**6**	**6**
(Mexico) E Montaño	2	2
Q	**(Ecuador) R Ycaza**	**6**	**6**
(Switzerland) C Dowdeswell	4	3
(Sweden) S Simonsson	4	3
8	**(Argentina) JL Clerc**	**6**	**6**

Second round
1	**(United States) G Mayer**	**6**	**6**
Q	(Chile) J Núñez	2	2
(Finland) L Palin	3	1
16	**(United States) T Moor**	**6**	**6**
13	**(Australia) K Warwick**	**7**	3	**7**
(Peru) F Maynetto	6	**6**	5
Q	(Ecuador) R Ycaza	1	2
8	**(Argentina) JL Clerc**	**6**	**6**

Third round
1	(United States) G Mayer	2	3
16	**(United States) T Moor**	**6**	**6**
13	(Australia) K Warwick	2	1
8	**(Argentina) JL Clerc**	**6**	**6**

Quarterfinals
16	(United States) T Moor	3	0
8	**(Argentina) JL Clerc**	**6**	**6**

==== Section 2 ====
First round
4	**(Czechoslovakia) I Lendl**	2	**6**	**6**
(Argentina) R Cano	**6**	0	4
**(France) C Freyss**	**6**	**6**
(United Kingdom) J Lloyd	1	2
**(United States) B Martin**	**6**	**6**
(United States) B Willenborg	3	4
(Chile) J Fillol	4	0
10	**(United States) E Teltscher**	**6**	**6**
11	(Mexico) R Ramírez	4	**6**	4
Q	**(United States) J Hayes**	**6**	2	**6**
Q	**(Spain) R Vizcaíno**	2	**6**	**6**
Q	(United States) M Freeman	**6**	2	3
**(Australia) D Carter**	**6**	**6**
(United States) G Hardie	2	2
(Brazil) J Soares	1	5
5	**(Spain) J Higueras**	**6**	**7**

Second round
4	(Czechoslovakia) I Lendl	3	0
**(France) C Freyss**	**6**	**6**
(United States) B Martin	2	3
10	**(United States) E Teltscher**	**6**	**6**
Q	**(United States) J Hayes**	**7**	**6**
Q	(Spain) R Vizcaíno	6	2
(Australia) D Carter	**6**	2	0
5	**(Spain) J Higueras**	2	**6**	**6**

Third round
(France) C Freyss	2	4
10	**(United States) E Teltscher**	**6**	**6**
Q	(United States) J Hayes	5	**6**	1
5	**(Spain) J Higueras**	**7**	3	**6**

Quarterfinals
10	(United States) E Teltscher	3	**6**	3
5	**(Spain) J Higueras**	**6**	4	**6**

=== Bottom half ===
==== Section 3 ====
First round
7	(Chile) H Gildemeister	4	0
Q	**(Uruguay) JL Damiani**	**6**	**6**
**(United States) M Cahill**	**6**	**6**
(Argentina) C Gattiker	3	3
**(Bolivia) M Martinez**	**6**	**6**
(Czechoslovakia) J Kodeš	2	4
**(Australia) P Kronk**	**6**	**7**
15	(Australia) C Dibley	3	6
9	**(United States) V Amaya**	**6**	**6**
(United States) C Owens	4	2
**(Sweden) P Hjertquist**	**6**	**7**
(Australia) W Maher	3	5
**(India) R Krishnan**	**6**	**6**
(Australia) G Masters	1	2
(Ecuador) A Gómez	**6**	4	0
3	**(United States) E Dibbs**	3	**6**	**6**

Second round
Q	**(Uruguay) JL Damiani**	**6**	**6**
(United States) M Cahill	3	4
**(Bolivia) M Martinez**	**6**	**6**
(Australia) P Kronk	3	0
9	(United States) V Amaya	**6**	0	0
**(Sweden) P Hjertquist**	4	**6**	**6**
(India) R Krishnan	2	2
3	**(United States) E Dibbs**	**6**	**6**

Third round
Q	(Uruguay) JL Damiani	2	2
**(Bolivia) M Martinez**	**6**	**6**
(Sweden) P Hjertquist	1	1
3	**(United States) E Dibbs**	**6**	**6**

Quarterfinals
**(Bolivia) M Martinez**	**7**	**6**
3	(United States) E Dibbs	6	2

==== Section 4 ====
First round
6	**(Poland) W Fibak**	**7**	4	**6**
(United States) V Winitsky	5	**6**	1
**(Australia) M Edmondson**	**6**	**6**
(United States) M Grant	3	4
**(Socialist Federal Republic of Yugoslavia) Ž Franulović**	**7**	**6**
(Australia) R Case	5	1
Q	(Argentina) G Aubone	6	5
12	**(Australia) P Dent**	**7**	**7**
14	**(United States) H Pfister**	**6**	**6**
(Australia) J James	3	3
Q	**(United States) M Purcell**	**6**	**3**
(France) P Portes	0	0^{r}
**(Spain) F Luna**	**7**	1	**6**
(Czechoslovakia) S Birner	6	**6**	1
(United States) R Fagel	2	4
2	**(United States) H Solomon**	**6**	**6**

Second round
6	**(Poland) W Fibak**	**6**	**6**
(Australia) M Edmondson	2	2
**(Socialist Federal Republic of Yugoslavia) Ž Franulović**	3	**6**	**6**
12	(Australia) P Dent	**6**	4	0
14	(United States) H Pfister	4	0
Q	**(United States) M Purcell**	**6**	**6**
(Spain) F Luna	3	3
2	**(United States) H Solomon**	**6**	**6**

Third round
6	**(Poland) W Fibak**	**6**	**6**
(Socialist Federal Republic of Yugoslavia) Ž Franulović	4	3
Q	**(United States) M Purcell**	4	**6**	**6**
2	(United States) H Solomon	**6**	0	2

Quarterfinals
6	(Poland) W Fibak	1	3
Q	**(United States) M Purcell**	**6**	**6**
