= 1981 U.S. Clay Court Championships – Men's singles =

Men's tennis tournament

Men's singles
- 1981 U.S. Clay Court Championships

Final
- Champion: (Argentina) José Luis Clerc
- Runner-up: (Czechoslovakia) Ivan Lendl
- Score: 4–6, 6–4, 6–2

Details
- Draw: 64
- Seeds: 16

Events
Singles	men	women
Doubles	men	women
- U.S. Clay Court Championships

Second-seed José Luis Clerc retained the title by defeating Ivan Lendl in the final and claimed first prize money of $32,000.

== Seeds ==
A champion seed is indicated in bold text while text in italics indicates the round in which that seed was eliminated.

1. (Czechoslovakia) Ivan Lendl (final)
2. (Argentina) José Luis Clerc **(champion)**
3. (Argentina) Guillermo Vilas (semifinals)
4. (United States) Harold Solomon (second round)
5. (United States) Mel Purcell (quarterfinals)
6. (Spain) José Higueras (third round)
7. (Czechoslovakia) Tomáš Šmíd (second round)
8. (United States) Eddie Dibbs (first round)
9. (Chile) Hans Gildemeister (third round)
10. (Uruguay) José Luis Damiani (quarterfinals)
11. (United States) Terry Moor (first round)
12. (Bolivia) Mario Martinez (first round)
13. (Switzerland) Heinz Günthardt (second round)
14. (Israel) Shlomo Glickstein (third round)
15. (Australia) Mark Edmondson (third round)
16. (Ecuador) ~~Ricardo Ycaza~~ (withdrew — expecting child)

== Draw ==
Key

- Q = Qualifier
- WC = Wild card
- LL = Lucky loser
- Alt = Alternate
- ITF = ITF entry
- PR = Protected ranking
- SR = Special ranking
- SE = Special exempt
- JE = Junior exempt
- JR = Junior Accelerator Programme entrant
- CO = College Accelerator Programme entrant
- NG = Next Gen Accelerator Program entrant
- w/o = Walkover
- r = Retired
- d = Defaulted

=== Finals ===
Quarterfinals
1	**(Czechoslovakia) Ivan Lendl**	**6**	**6**
10	(Uruguay) José Luis Damiani	2	4
3	**(Argentina) Guillermo Vilas**	**6**	**6**
(Argentina) Ricardo Cano	3	1
(France) Gilles Moretton	**6**	5	4
**(Australia) John Alexander**	3	**7**	**6**
5	(United States) Mel Purcell	3	3
2	**(Argentina) José Luis Clerc**	**6**	**6**

Semifinals
1	**(Czechoslovakia) Ivan Lendl**	**6**	**7**
3	(Argentina) Guillermo Vilas	3	5
(Australia) John Alexander	**6**	3	1
2	**(Argentina) José Luis Clerc**	3	**6**	**6**

Final
1	(Czechoslovakia) Ivan Lendl	**6**	4	2
2	**(Argentina) José Luis Clerc**	4	**6**	**6**

=== Top half ===
==== Section 1 ====
First round
1	**(Czechoslovakia) I Lendl**	**6**	**6**
(United States) R Fagel	2	1
(Chile) J Núñez	4	2
**(United States) J Benson**	**6**	**6**
**(Chile) B Prajoux**	**6**	**6**
(Philippines) M Ampon	1	3
(Argentina) E Bengoechea	4	3
14	**(Israel) S Glickstein**	**6**	**6**
10	**(Uruguay) JL Damiani**	**6**	**6**
(United States) J Gurfein	4	3
(India) R Krishnan	6	2
**(Sweden) P Hjertquist**	**7**	**6**
(Colombia) A Cortes	**7**	5	4
**(United States) J Hayes**	5	**7**	**6**
(Spain) J López-Maeso	1	1
6	**(Spain) J Higueras**	**6**	**6**

Second round
1	**(Czechoslovakia) I Lendl**	**6**	**6**
(United States) J Benson	3	4
(Chile) B Prajoux	**7**	4	2
14	**(Israel) S Glickstein**	5	**6**	**6**
10	**(Uruguay) JL Damiani**	**6**	**6**
(Sweden) P Hjertquist	1	1
(United States) J Hayes	1	1
6	**(Spain) J Higueras**	**6**	**6**

Third round
1	**(Czechoslovakia) I Lendl**	**6**	**6**
14	(Israel) S Glickstein	2	1
10	**(Uruguay) JL Damiani**	**6**	**6**
6	(Spain) J Higueras	0	4

Quarterfinals
1	**(Czechoslovakia) I Lendl**	**6**	**6**
10	(Uruguay) JL Damiani	2	4

==== Section 2 ====
First round
3	**(Argentina) G Vilas**	**6**	**6**
(United States) C Wittus	0	1
**(United Kingdom) J Smith**	**6**	6	**6**
(United States) M De Palmer	4	**7**	1
**(France) C Freyss**	5	**6**	**6**
(United States) T Lundy	**7**	4	4
**(Sweden) H Simonsson**	**6**	**6**
11	(United States) T Moor	2	4
15	**(Australia) M Edmondson**	**6**	**6**
(United States) M Cahill	2	1
**(South Africa) D Joubert**	**6**	**6**
(United States) G Holroyd	4	1
(Chile) Á Fillol	4	4
**(Argentina) R Cano**	**6**	**6**
**(New Zealand) C Lewis**	**6**	1	**6**
8	(United States) E Dibbs	4	**6**	2

Second round
3	**(Argentina) G Vilas**	**6**	**6**
(United Kingdom) J Smith	3	2
(France) C Freyss	5	3
**(Sweden) H Simonsson**	**7**	**6**
15	**(Australia) M Edmondson**	**7**	**6**
(South Africa) D Joubert	6	4
**(Argentina) R Cano**	**6**	**6**
(New Zealand) C Lewis	2	2

Third round
3	**(Argentina) G Vilas**	**6**	**6**
(Sweden) H Simonsson	4	1
15	(Australia) M Edmondson	**7**	6	0
**(Argentina) R Cano**	6	**7**	**6**

Quarterfinals
3	**(Argentina) G Vilas**	**6**	**6**
(Argentina) R Cano	3	1

=== Bottom half ===
==== Section 3 ====
First round
7	**(Czechoslovakia) T Šmíd**	**6**	**6**
(United States) R Van't Hof	2	4
(Austria) P Feigl	**6**	6	2
**(France) G Moretton**	2	**7**	**6**
**(United States) V Winitsky**	**7**	**6**
(Brazil) M Hocevar	5	3
(United States) S Denton	3	6
9	**(Chile) H Gildemeister**	**6**	**7**
**(Australia) J Alexander**	**6**	**6**
(United States) B Gilbert	3	3
**(Romania) I Năstase**	**6**	**6**
(Switzerland) R Stadler	4	2
(Sweden) J Norbäck	**6**	3	4
**(Australia) D Carter**	4	**6**	**6**
(Socialist Federal Republic of Yugoslavia) M Ostoja	1	1
4	**(United States) H Solomon**	**6**	**6**

Second round
7	(Czechoslovakia) T Šmíd	2	4
**(France) G Moretton**	**6**	**6**
(United States) V Winitsky	2	2
9	**(Chile) H Gildemeister**	**6**	**6**
**(Australia) J Alexander**	**6**	**6**
(Romania) I Năstase	3	2
**(Australia) D Carter**	**6**	**6**
4	(United States) H Solomon	2	4

Third round
**(France) G Moretton**	**6**	**7**
9	(Chile) H Gildemeister	4	6
**(Australia) J Alexander**	**6**	**6**
(Australia) D Carter	4	3

Quarterfinals
(France) G Moretton	**6**	5	4
**(Australia) J Alexander**	3	**7**	**6**

==== Section 4 ====
First round
5	**(United States) M Purcell**	**5**
(Czechoslovakia) P Složil	0^{r}
**(Spain) M Orantes**	**6**	**6**
(Czechoslovakia) S Birner	4	2
**(Spain) G Urpí**	**6**	**7**
(Peru) F Maynetto	1	5
(United States) C Strode	6	0
13	**(Switzerland) H Günthardt**	**7**	**6**
12	(Bolivia) M Martinez	**6**	3	3
**(Ecuador) A Gómez**	2	**6**	**6**
**(Argentina) C Castellan**	**6**	**6**
(Chile) J Ayala	1	1
**(United States) C Delaney**	**6**	**6**
(United States) B Nealon	3	3
(United States) S Stewart	4	4
2	**(Argentina) JL Clerc**	**6**	**6**

Second round
5	**(United States) M Purcell**	**6**	**6**
(Spain) M Orantes	1	2
**(Spain) G Urpí**	**7**	**6**
13	(Switzerland) H Günthardt	5	2
**(Ecuador) A Gómez**	**6**	**6**
(Argentina) C Castellan	4	0
(United States) C Delaney	2	1
2	**(Argentina) JL Clerc**	**6**	**6**

Third round
5	**(United States) M Purcell**	6	**6**	**5**
(Spain) G Urpí	**7**	1	4^{r}
(Ecuador) A Gómez	6	3
2	**(Argentina) JL Clerc**	**7**	**6**

Quarterfinals
5	(United States) M Purcell	3	3
2	**(Argentina) JL Clerc**	**6**	**6**
