= 1979 U.S. Clay Court Championships – Men's singles =

Men's singles
- 1979 U.S. Clay Court Championships

Final
- Champion: (United States) Jimmy Connors
- Runner-up: (Argentina) Guillermo Vilas
- Score: 6–1, 2–6, 6–4

Details
- Draw: 64
- Seeds: 16

Events
Singles	men	women
Doubles	men	women
- U.S. Clay Court Championships

Top-seed Jimmy Connors claimed the title and first prize money of $25,000 by defeating third-seeded Guillermo Vilas in the final.

This tournament was also notable for the first meeting between Connors and Ivan Lendl, who would go on to play a total of 35 matches between each other; Connors won their quarterfinal match.

== Seeds ==
A champion seed is indicated in bold text while text in italics indicates the round in which that seed was eliminated.

1. (United States) **Jimmy Connors (champion)**
2. (United States) John McEnroe (semifinals)
3. (Argentina) Guillermo Vilas (final)
4. (Spain) José Higueras (semifinals)
5. (Argentina) José Luis Clerc (quarterfinals)
6. (United States) Gene Mayer (first round)
7. (Poland) Wojciech Fibak (third round)
8. (Spain) Manuel Orantes (quarterfinals)
9. (United States) Eliot Teltscher (third round)
10. (Hungary) Balázs Taróczy (third round)
11. (Italy) Corrado Barazzutti (quarterfinals)
12. (Czechoslovakia) Tomáš Šmíd (third round)
13. (Czechoslovakia) Ivan Lendl (quarterfinals)
14. (Austria) Peter Feigl (first round)
15. (New Zealand) Chris Lewis (second round)
16. (Australia) Peter McNamara (third round)

== Draw ==
Key

- Q = Qualifier
- WC = Wild card
- LL = Lucky loser
- Alt = Alternate
- ITF = ITF entry
- PR = Protected ranking
- SR = Special ranking
- SE = Special exempt
- JE = Junior exempt
- JR = Junior Accelerator Programme entrant
- CO = College Accelerator Programme entrant
- NG = Next Gen Accelerator Program entrant
- w/o = Walkover
- r = Retired
- d = Defaulted

=== Finals ===
Quarterfinals
1	**(United States) Jimmy Connors**	**6**	**7**
13	(Czechoslovakia) Ivan Lendl	2	6
4	**(Spain) José Higueras**	**6**	**6**
11	(Italy) Corrado Barazzutti	4	1
5	(Argentina) José Luis Clerc	3	6
3	**(Argentina) Guillermo Vilas**	**6**	**7**
8	(Spain) Manuel Orantes	3	3
2	**(United States) John McEnroe**	**6**	**6**

Semifinals
1	**(United States) Jimmy Connors**	**6**	**7**
4	(Spain) José Higueras	2	5
3	**(Argentina) Guillermo Vilas**	**6**	**7**
2	(United States) John McEnroe	4	5

Final
1	**(United States) Jimmy Connors**	**6**	2	**6**
3	(Argentina) Guillermo Vilas	1	**6**	4

=== Top half ===
==== Section 1 ====
First round
1	**(United States) J Connors**	**6**	**7**
(Australia) M Edmondson	4	5
**(Czechoslovakia) P Složil**	**6**	**6**
(Argentina) F Dalla Fontana	2	0
Q	**(Australia) W Maher**	**6**	**6**
(Australia) J Marks	2	2
(Mexico) E Montaño	0	0
10	**(Hungary) B Taróczy**	**6**	**6**
13	**(Czechoslovakia) I Lendl**	**7**	**6**
(Australia) R Case	5	1
(Australia) J James	3	3
**(Australia) P Kronk**	**6**	**6**
Q	(United Kingdom) R Drysdale	3	3
Q	**(United States) Z Guerry**	**6**	**6**
**(Chile) J Fillol**	1	**6**	**6**
6	(United States) G Mayer	**6**	2	3

Second round
1	**(United States) J Connors**	**6**	**6**
(Czechoslovakia) P Složil	3	2
Q	(Australia) W Maher	2	4
10	**(Hungary) B Taróczy**	**6**	**6**
13	**(Czechoslovakia) I Lendl**	**6**	**6**
(Australia) P Kronk	3	1
Q	(United States) Z Guerry	3	**6**	7
**(Chile) J Fillol**	**6**	2	**9**

Third round
1	**(United States) J Connors**	5	**6**	**9**
10	(Hungary) B Taróczy	**7**	1	7
13	**(Czechoslovakia) I Lendl**	**6**	**7**
(Chile) J Fillol	2	5

Quarterfinals
1	**(United States) J Connors**	**6**	**7**
13	(Czechoslovakia) I Lendl	2	6

==== Section 2 ====
First round
4	**(Spain) J Higueras**	**6**	**6**
(United States) R Crawford	2	2
(Switzerland) C Dowdeswell	6	3
**(Australia) P McNamee**	**7**	**6**
**(United States) H Schoenfield**	**7**	0	**6**
(South Africa) D Joubert	6	**6**	0
(United States) F McNair	2	0
16	**(Australia) P McNamara**	**6**	**6**
11	**(Italy) C Barazzutti**	**6**
(United States) C Stansbury	3	r
**(Czechoslovakia) J Hřebec**	**6**	**6**
(United States) J Lapidus	3	0
(United States) G Hardie	4	5
**(United Kingdom) J Lloyd**	**6**	**7**
(West Germany) A Maurer	2	2
7	**(Poland) W Fibak**	**6**	**6**

Second round
4	**(Spain) J Higueras**	**6**	3
(Australia) P McNamee	0	0^{r}
(United States) H Schoenfield	2	**7**	2
16	**(Australia) P McNamara**	**6**	5	**6**
11	**(Italy) C Barazzutti**	**6**	**6**
(Czechoslovakia) J Hřebec	3	0
(United Kingdom) J Lloyd	4	3
7	**(Poland) W Fibak**	**6**	**6**

Third round
4	**(Spain) J Higueras**	**6**	**6**
16	(Australia) P McNamara	4	2
11	**(Italy) C Barazzutti**	**6**	6	**6**
7	(Poland) W Fibak	2	**7**	4

Quarterfinals
4	**(Spain) J Higueras**	**6**	**6**
11	(Italy) C Barazzutti	4	1

=== Bottom half ===
==== Section 3 ====
First round
5	**(Argentina) JL Clerc**	**6**	**7**
Q	(Chile) J Núñez	2	6
(Zimbabwe Rhodesia) A Pattison	3	5
**(United States) N Saviano**	**6**	**7**
**(Australia) K Warwick**	**7**	**6**
Q	(United States) L Bourne	6	0
(United States) D Bohrnstedt	1	0^{r}
9	**(United States) E Teltscher**	**6**	2
12	**(Czechoslovakia) T Šmíd**	**6**	**6**
(United States) M Shore	1	1
**(Australia) B Drewett**	**6**	**6**
(Australia) N Phillips	1	0
(Israel) S Krulevitz	**6**	1	1
**(United States) V Winitsky**	4	**6**	**6**
(United States) M Purcell	2	2
3	**(Argentina) G Vilas**	**6**	**6**

Second round
5	**(Argentina) JL Clerc**	**6**	**6**
(United States) N Saviano	2	1
(Australia) K Warwick	2	4
9	**(United States) E Teltscher**	**6**	**6**
12	**(Czechoslovakia) T Šmíd**	**6**	**7**
(Australia) B Drewett	4	6
(United States) V Winitsky	5	3
3	**(Argentina) G Vilas**	**7**	**6**

Third round
5	**(Argentina) JL Clerc**	**6**	**6**
9	(United States) E Teltscher	3	2
12	(Czechoslovakia) T Šmíd	1	4
3	**(Argentina) G Vilas**	**6**	**6**

Quarterfinals
5	(Argentina) JL Clerc	3	6
3	**(Argentina) G Vilas**	**6**	**7**

==== Section 4 ====
First round
8	**(Spain) M Orantes**	**7**	**7**
Q	(United States) T Mayotte	5	5
(Australia) D Collings	4	3
Q	**(United States) M Grant**	**6**	**6**
(Zimbabwe Rhodesia) H Ismail	**6**	3	4
**(Ecuador) A Gómez**	4	**6**	**6**
(Czechoslovakia) J Kodeš	5	3
15	**(New Zealand) C Lewis**	**7**	**6**
14	(Austria) P Feigl	6	2^{r}
**(Ecuador) R Ycaza**	**7**	4
(France) C Roger-Vasselin	**6**	3	4
**(Venezuela) J Andrew**	1	**6**	**6**
Q	(United States) R Van't Hof	**6**	3	3
**(India) R Krishnan**	4	**6**	**6**
(United States) M Cahill	5	1
2	**(United States) J McEnroe**	**7**	**6**

Second round
8	**(Spain) M Orantes**	**6**	**6**
Q	(United States) M Grant	2	3
**(Ecuador) A Gómez**	**6**	**6**
15	(New Zealand) C Lewis	3	2
**(Ecuador) R Ycaza**	**6**	6	**7**
(Venezuela) J Andrew	4	**7**	5
(India) R Krishnan	4	1
2	**(United States) J McEnroe**	**6**	**6**

Third round
8	**(Spain) M Orantes**	4
(Ecuador) A Gómez	2^{r}
(Ecuador) R Ycaza	1	1
2	**(United States) J McEnroe**	**6**	**6**

Quarterfinals
8	(Spain) M Orantes	3	3
2	**(United States) J McEnroe**	**6**	**6**
