= 1981 U.S. Clay Court Championships =

- Date: August 3–9
- Edition: 13th
- Draw: 64S / 32D (M); 56S / 32D (W)
- Prize money: $380,000
- Surface: Clay / outdoor
- Location: Indianapolis, US

Champions

Men's singles
- (Argentina) José Luis Clerc

Women's singles
- (United States) Andrea Jaeger

Men's doubles
- (South Africa) Kevin Curren / (United States) Steve Denton

Women's doubles
- (United States) JoAnne Russell / (Romania) Virginia Ruzici
← 1980 ·	U.S. Clay Court Championships	· 1982 →

The 1981 U.S. Clay Court Championships was a men's Grand Prix and women's Toyota Series tennis tournament held in Indianapolis in the United States and played on outdoor clay courts. It was the 13th edition of the tournament and was held from August 3 through August 9, 1981. Second-seeded José Luis Clerc and top-seeded Andrea Jaeger won the singles titles.

== Finals ==
=== Men's singles ===
(Argentina) José Luis Clerc defeated (Czechoslovakia) Ivan Lendl 4–6, 6–4, 6–2

- It was Clerc's 6th title of the year and the 16th of his career.

=== Women's singles ===
(United States) Andrea Jaeger defeated (Romania) Virginia Ruzici 6–1, 6–0

- It was Jaeger's 3rd title of the year and the 7th of her career.

=== Men's doubles ===
(South Africa) Kevin Curren / (United States) Steve Denton defeated (Mexico) Raúl Ramírez / (United States) Van Winitsky 6–3, 5–7, 7–5

- It was Curren's 2nd title of the year and the 5th of his career. It was Denton's 2nd title of the year and the 6th of his career.

=== Women's doubles ===
(United States) JoAnne Russell / (Romania) Virginia Ruzici defeated (United Kingdom) Sue Barker / (United States) Paula Smith 6–2, 6–2

- It was Russell's 1st title of the year and the 2nd of her career. It was Ruzici's 1st title of the year and the 12th of her career.
