= 1981 U.S. Clay Court Championships – Women's doubles =

Women's doubles
- 1981 U.S. Clay Court Championships

Final
- Champions: (United States) JoAnne Russell (Romania) Virginia Ruzici
- Runners-up: (United Kingdom) Sue Barker (United States) Paula Smith
- Score: 6–2, 6–2

Events
Singles	men	women
Doubles	men	women
← 1980 ·	U.S. Clay Court Championships	· 1982 →

Second-seeded JoAnne Russell and Virginia Ruzici won the title and $9,600 first-prize money after defeating Sue Barker and Paula Smith in the final.

== Seeds ==
A champion seed is indicated in bold text while text in italics indicates the round in which that seed was eliminated.

1. (United States) Andrea Jaeger / (United States) Anne Smith (semifinals)
2. (United States) **JoAnne Russell / (Romania) Virginia Ruzici (champions)**
3. (United Kingdom) Sue Barker / (United States) Paula Smith (final)
4. (Czechoslovakia) Regina Maršíková / (United States) Mary Lou Piatek (quarterfinals)
5. (Socialist Federal Republic of Yugoslavia) Mima Jaušovec / (Czechoslovakia) Renáta Tomanová (second round)
6. (United States) Laura duPont / (United States) Barbara Jordan (second round)
7. (South Africa) Rosalyn Fairbank / (United States) Kim Sands (quarterfinals)
8. (United States) Sandy Collins / (Switzerland) Hana Strachoňová (first round)

== Draw ==
=== Key ===
- Q = Qualifier
- WC = Wild card
- LL = Lucky loser
- Alt = Alternate
- SE = Special exempt
- PR = Protected ranking
- ITF = ITF entry
- JE = Junior exempt
- w/o = Walkover
- r = Retired
- d = Defaulted
- SR = Special ranking

=== Finals ===
Semifinals
1	(United States) Andrea Jaeger (United States) Anne Smith	**6**	5	6
3	**(United Kingdom) Sue Barker** **(United States) Paula Smith**	1	**7**	**8**
(Australia) Elizabeth Little (South Africa) Yvonne Vermaak	2	1
2	**(United States) JoAnne Russell** **(Romania) Virginia Ruzici**	**6**	**6**

Final
3	(United Kingdom) Sue Barker (United States) Paula Smith	2	2
2	**(United States) JoAnne Russell** **(Romania) Virginia Ruzici**	**6**	**6**

=== Top half ===
First round
1	**(United States) A Jaeger** **(United States) A Smith**	**6**	**6**
(United States) E Burgin (United States) S Jaeger	1	1
**(United States) C Copeland** **(United States) A Moulton**	2	**6**	**7**
(United States) K Henry (United States) S Solomon	**6**	2	5
(United States) D Rubin (United States) A Spex	4	2
**(Australia) B Remilton** **(Japan) N Sato**	**6**	**6**
(United States) K Cummings (United States) F Raschiatore	3	3
6	**(United States) L duPont** **(United States) B Jordan**	**6**	**6**
3	**(United Kingdom) S Barker** **(United States) P Smith**	**6**	**6**
(United States) J Nachand (Australia) P Whytcross	1	0
(United States) K Horvath (United States) B Norton	3	4
**(United States) S Mascarin** **(United States) A White**	**6**	**6**
**(Australia) D Freeman** **(Australia) S Saliba**	**7**	**6**
(United States) J Portman (United States) R Richards	6	3
**(Brazil) P Medrado** **(Peru) P Vásquez**	2	**7**	**6**
8	(United States) S Collins (Switzerland) H Strachoňová	**6**	6	1

Second round
1	**(United States) A Jaeger** **(United States) A Smith**	**6**	**6**
(United States) C Copeland (United States) A Moulton	3	4
**(Australia) B Remilton** **(Japan) N Sato**	**7**	2	**6**
6	(United States) L duPont (United States) B Jordan	6	**6**	1
3	**(United Kingdom) S Barker** **(United States) P Smith**	2	**6**	**6**
(United States) S Mascarin (United States) A White	**6**	4	1
(Australia) D Freeman (Australia) S Saliba	**7**	4	3
**(Brazil) P Medrado** **(Peru) P Vásquez**	6	**6**	**6**

Quarterfinals
1	**(United States) A Jaeger** **(United States) A Smith**	5	**6**	**6**
(Australia) B Remilton (Japan) N Sato	**7**	2	2
3	**(United Kingdom) S Barker** **(United States) P Smith**	**6**	**6**
(Brazil) P Medrado (Peru) P Vásquez	4	1

Semifinals
1	(United States) A Jaeger (United States) A Smith	**6**	5	6
3	**(United Kingdom) S Barker** **(United States) P Smith**	1	**7**	**8**

=== Bottom half ===
First round
5	**(Socialist Federal Republic of Yugoslavia) M Jaušovec** **(Czechoslovakia) R Tomanová**	**6**	**7**
(Czechoslovakia) I Budařová (United States) J Filkoff	1	5
**(Australia) E Little** **(South Africa) Y Vermaak**	**6**	**6**
(France) M-C Calleja (United States) V Nelson	2	3
(United States) D Gilbert (United States) K Steinmetz	5	1
**(United States) P Casale** **(United States) K Rinaldi**	**7**	**6**
(Australia) N Gregory (Hungary) M Pinterová	3	1
4	**(Czechoslovakia) R Maršíková** **(United States) M L Piatek**	**6**	**6**
7	**(South Africa) R Fairbank** **(United States) K Sands**	**6**	**6**
(United States) A-M Fernandez (United States) K Keil	3	2
(United States) Cissie Donigan (United States) J DuVall	**6**	0	0
**(United States) J Davis** **(United States) H Ludloff**	3	**6**	**6**
**(Czechoslovakia) Y Brzáková** **(Czechoslovakia) K Skronská**	**6**	**6**
(United States) A Henricksson (United States) K Jones	2	3
(United Kingdom) G Coles (United Kingdom) D Jevans	4	2
2	**(United States) J Russell** **(Romania) V Ruzici**	**6**	**6**

Second round
5	(Socialist Federal Republic of Yugoslavia) M Jaušovec (Czechoslovakia) R Tomanová	3	2
**(Australia) E Little** **(South Africa) Y Vermaak**	**6**	**6**
(United States) P Casale (United States) K Rinaldi	**6**	2	4
4	**(Czechoslovakia) R Maršíková** **(United States) M L Piatek**	3	**6**	**6**
7	**(South Africa) R Fairbank** **(United States) K Sands**	4	**6**	**6**
(United States) J Davis (United States) H Ludloff	**6**	1	2
(Czechoslovakia) Y Brzáková (Czechoslovakia) K Skronská	4	1
2	**(United States) J Russell** **(Romania) V Ruzici**	**6**	**6**

Quarterfinals
**(Australia) E Little** **(South Africa) Y Vermaak**	**6**	1	**6**
4	(Czechoslovakia) R Maršíková (United States) M L Piatek	3	**6**	2
7	(South Africa) R Fairbank (United States) K Sands	4	2
2	**(United States) J Russell** **(Romania) V Ruzici**	**6**	**6**

Semifinals
(Australia) E Little (South Africa) Y Vermaak	2	1
2	**(United States) J Russell** **(Romania) V Ruzici**	**6**	**6**
