= 1979 U.S. Clay Court Championships – Men's doubles =

Men's doubles
- 1979 U.S. Clay Court Championships

Final
- Champions: (United States) Gene Mayer (United States) John McEnroe
- Runners-up: (Czechoslovakia) Jan Kodeš (Czechoslovakia) Tomáš Šmíd
- Score: 6–4, 7–6

Details
- Draw: 32
- Seeds: 8

Events
Singles	men	women
Doubles	men	women
- U.S. Clay Court Championships

Gene Mayer returned with John McEnroe to defend the title he had won with Hank Pfister. Top-seeds Mayer and McEnroe defeated No.2 pair Jan Kodeš and Tomáš Šmíd in the final for a prize of $9,200.

== Seeds ==
A champion seed is indicated in bold text while text in italics indicates the round in which that seed was eliminated.

1. (United States) **Gene Mayer / (United States) John McEnroe (champions)**
2. (Czechoslovakia) Jan Kodeš / (Czechoslovakia) Tomáš Šmíd (final)
3. (Australia) Mark Edmondson / (Australia) John Marks (semifinals)
4. (Switzerland) Colin Dowdeswell / (Hungary) Balázs Taróczy (semifinals)
5. (United Kingdom) Robin Drysdale / (United States) Van Winitsky (second round)
6. (Australia) Ross Case / (Chile) Jaime Fillol (quarterfinals)
7. (New Zealand) Chris Lewis / (Australia) Paul McNamee (second round)
8. (Australia) Paul Kronk / (Australia) Peter McNamara (quarterfinals)

== Draw ==
Key

- Q = Qualifier
- WC = Wild card
- LL = Lucky loser
- Alt = Alternate
- ITF = ITF entry
- PR = Protected ranking
- SR = Special ranking
- SE = Special exempt
- JE = Junior exempt
- JR = Junior Accelerator Programme entrant
- CO = College Accelerator Programme entrant
- NG = Next Gen Accelerator Program entrant
- w/o = Walkover
- r = Retired
- d = Defaulted

=== Finals ===
Semifinals
1	**(United States) Gene Mayer** **(United States) John McEnroe**	**6**	**6**
3	(Australia) Mark Edmondson (Australia) John Marks	1	4
4	(Switzerland) Colin Dowdeswell (Hungary) Balázs Taróczy	3	**6**	7
2	**(Czechoslovakia) Jan Kodeš** **(Czechoslovakia) Tomáš Šmíd**	**6**	2	**9**

Final
1	**(United States) Gene Mayer** **(United States) John McEnroe**	**6**	**7**
2	(Czechoslovakia) Jan Kodeš (Czechoslovakia) Tomáš Šmíd	4	6

=== Top half ===
First round
1	**(United States) G Mayer** **(United States) J McEnroe**	**6**	**6**
(United States) F Buehning (United States) B Nichols	3	2
(United States) T Mayotte (United States) L Stefanki	1	2
**(United States) M Cahill** **(Israel) S Krulevitz**	**6**	**6**
(United States) G Hardie (United States) E Teltscher	2	**7**	7
**(Czechoslovakia) J Hřebec** **(Czechoslovakia) P Složil**	**6**	5	**9**
(Chile) J Núñez (Chile) P Rodríguez	1	**6**	3
7	**(New Zealand) C Lewis** **(Australia) P McNamee**	**6**	4	**6**
3	**(Australia) M Edmondson** **(Australia) J Marks**	**6**	**6**
(Venezuela) J Andrew (Czechoslovakia) I Lendl	3	3
(Australia) N Callaghan (United States) G Holroyd	4	6
**(Australia) B Drewett** **(Australia) J James**	**6**	**7**
(United States) M Greenberg (United States) G Petrovic	1	2
**(United States) T Delatte** **(United States) M Purcell**	**6**	**6**
(Australia) D Collings (Australia) K Warwick	1	3
6	**(Australia) R Case** **(Chile) J Fillol**	**6**	**6**

Second round
1	**(United States) G Mayer** **(United States) J McEnroe**	**6**	**6**
(United States) M Cahill (Israel) S Krulevitz	4	4
**(Czechoslovakia) J Hřebec** **(Czechoslovakia) P Složil**	**6**	3	**6**
7	(New Zealand) C Lewis (Australia) P McNamee	3	**6**	4
3	**(Australia) M Edmondson** **(Australia) J Marks**	**6**	**6**
(Australia) B Drewett (Australia) J James	1	2
(United States) T Delatte (United States) M Purcell	3	0
6	**(Australia) R Case** **(Chile) J Fillol**	**6**	**6**

Quarterfinals
1	**(United States) G Mayer** **(United States) J McEnroe**	**6**	**6**
(Czechoslovakia) J Hřebec (Czechoslovakia) P Složil	3	4
3	**(Australia) M Edmondson** **(Australia) J Marks**	**7**	3	**6**
6	(Australia) R Case (Chile) J Fillol	6	**6**	3

Semifinals
1	**(United States) G Mayer** **(United States) J McEnroe**	**6**	**6**
3	(Australia) M Edmondson (Australia) J Marks	1	4

=== Bottom half ===
First round
8	**(Australia) P Kronk** **(Australia) P McNamara**	**6**	**7**
(Australia) W Maher (Australia) N Phillips	3	6
**(Argentina) JL Clerc** **(Argentina) C Gattiker**	**6**	3	**6**
(United States) J Lapidus (United States) P Rennert	3	**6**	2
(United States) G Martinez (South Africa) Darryl Shapiro	2	1
**(Argentina) F Dalla Fontana** **(France) C Roger-Vasselin**	**6**	**6**
(United States) J DiLouie (United States) R Van't Hof	4	4
4	**(Switzerland) C Dowdeswell** **(Hungary) B Taróczy**	**6**	**6**
5	**(United Kingdom) R Drysdale** **(United States) V Winitsky**	**6**	**6**
(United States) L Bourne (Zimbabwe Rhodesia) H Ismail	4	2
(Ecuador) A Gómez (Ecuador) R Ycaza	6	**6**	2
**(United Kingdom) J Lloyd** **(United States) F McNair**	**7**	2	**6**
(United States) J Hayes (United States) C Stansbury	3	2
**(United States) R Crawford** **(United States) N Saviano**	**6**	**6**
(United States) J Eagleton (South Africa) D Joubert	4	1
2	**(Czechoslovakia) J Kodeš** **(Czechoslovakia) T Šmíd**	**6**	**6**

Second round
8	**(Australia) P Kronk** **(Australia) P McNamara**	**7**	**6**
(Argentina) JL Clerc (Argentina) C Gattiker	5	3
(Argentina) F Dalla Fontana (France) C Roger-Vasselin	**6**	4	2
4	**(Switzerland) C Dowdeswell** **(Hungary) B Taróczy**	3	**6**	**6**
5	(United Kingdom) R Drysdale (United States) V Winitsky	2	1
**(United Kingdom) J Lloyd** **(United States) F McNair**	**6**	**6**
(United States) R Crawford (United States) N Saviano	6	3
2	**(Czechoslovakia) J Kodeš** **(Czechoslovakia) T Šmíd**	**7**	**6**

Quarterfinals
8	(Australia) P Kronk (Australia) P McNamara	**6**	3	3
4	**(Switzerland) C Dowdeswell** **(Hungary) B Taróczy**	4	**6**	**6**
(United Kingdom) J Lloyd (United States) F McNair	2	**7**	3
2	**(Czechoslovakia) J Kodeš** **(Czechoslovakia) T Šmíd**	**6**	5	**6**

Semifinals
4	(Switzerland) C Dowdeswell (Hungary) B Taróczy	3	**6**	7
2	**(Czechoslovakia) J Kodeš** **(Czechoslovakia) T Šmíd**	**6**	2	**9**
