= 1980 U.S. Clay Court Championships – Women's doubles =

Women's doubles
- 1980 U.S. Clay Court Championships

Final
- Champions: (United States) Anne Smith (United States) Paula Smith
- Runners-up: (Romania) Virginia Ruzici (Czechoslovakia) Renáta Tomanová
- Score: 4–6, 6–3, 6–4

Events
Singles	men	women
Doubles	men	women
← 1979 ·	U.S. Clay Court Championships	· 1981 →

Top-seeded Anne Smith and Paula Smith won the title and $9,600 first-prize money after defeating Virginia Ruzici and Renáta Tomanová in the final.

== Seeds ==
A champion seed is indicated in bold text while text in italics indicates the round in which that seed was eliminated.

1. (United States) **Anne Smith / (United States) Paula Smith (champions)**
2. (United States) Laura duPont / (United States) JoAnne Russell (semifinals)
3. (Romania) Virginia Ruzici / (Czechoslovakia) Renáta Tomanová (final)
4. (United States) Lele Forood / (United States) Candy Reynolds (quarterfinals)

== Draw ==
=== Key ===
- Q = Qualifier
- WC = Wild card
- LL = Lucky loser
- Alt = Alternate
- SE = Special exempt
- PR = Protected ranking
- ITF = ITF entry
- JE = Junior exempt
- w/o = Walkover
- r = Retired
- d = Defaulted
- SR = Special ranking

=== Finals ===
Semifinals
1	**(United States) Anne Smith** **(United States) Paula Smith**	**7**	**6**
(United States) Andrea Jaeger (Czechoslovakia) Regina Maršíková	6	3
3	**(Romania) Virginia Ruzici** **(Czechoslovakia) Renáta Tomanová**	**6**	**6**
2	(United States) Laura duPont (United States) JoAnne Russell	2	4

Final
1	**(United States) Anne Smith** **(United States) Paula Smith**	4	**6**	**6**
3	(Romania) Virginia Ruzici (Czechoslovakia) Renáta Tomanová	**6**	3	4

=== Top half ===
First round
**(Australia) D Evers** **(Argentina) I Madruga**	**7**	**6**
(United States) H Ludloff (United States) A White	6	4
**(United States) S Acker** **(Australia) P Whytcross**	**6**	**6**
(Argentina) C Casabianca (Argentina) E Raponi	1	2
**(Belgium) M Gurdal** **(Japan) N Sato**	**6**	**6**
(France) C Franch (France) S Provoust	4	4
**(United States) Rita Agassi** **(United States) D Gilbert**	**6**	5	**6**
(United States) F Hutnick (United States) K Sands	1	**7**	4
**(United States) A Jaeger** **(Czechoslovakia) R Maršíková**	**7**	**6**
(United States) C Copeland (United States) D Rubin	6	2
(United Kingdom) G Coles (Australia) S Saliba	5	3
**(Switzerland) C Jolissaint** **(Switzerland) H Strachoňová**	**7**	**6**

Second round
1	**(United States) A Smith** **(United States) P Smith**	**6**	**6**
(Australia) D Evers (Argentina) I Madruga	4	3
**(United States) S Acker** **(Australia) P Whytcross**	**6**	**6**
(Belgium) M Gurdal (Japan) N Sato	1	4
4	**(United States) L Forood** **(United States) C Reynolds**	**6**	**6**
(United States) R Agassi (United States) D Gilbert	4	2
**(United States) A Jaeger** **(Czechoslovakia) R Maršíková**	**6**	**6**
(Switzerland) C Jolissaint (Switzerland) H Strachoňová	1	1

Quarterfinals
1	**(United States) A Smith** **(United States) P Smith**	**7**	**6**
(United States) S Acker (Australia) P Whytcross	5	3
4	(United States) L Forood (United States) C Reynolds	4	3
**(United States) A Jaeger** **(Czechoslovakia) R Maršíková**	**6**	**6**

Semifinals
1	**(United States) A Smith** **(United States) P Smith**	**7**	**6**
(United States) A Jaeger (Czechoslovakia) R Maršíková	6	3

=== Bottom half ===
First round
**(United States) A Henricksson** **(United States) K Jones**	**6**	**6**
(United States) V Beggs (United States) J Portman	1	4
(Australia) E Little (Australia) A Evans	3	3
**(New Zealand) C Newton** **(Australia) J Walker**	**6**	**6**
**(South Africa) R Fairbank** **(United States) M-L Piatek**	**6**	**6**
(United States) S Collins (United States) J DuVall	2	2
(United States) R Blount (South Africa) Y Vermaak	6	0
**(United States) B-A Dent** **(United States) J Newberry**	**7**	**6**
(Australia) K Gulley (Australia) K Pratt	4	5
**(United States) B Hallquist** **(United States) S McInerney**	**6**	**7**
(United States) M Brown (United States) L Lee	1	1
**(United States) L Doherty** **(United States) J Preyer**	**6**	**6**

Second round
**(United States) A Henricksson** **(United States) K Jones**	**6**	**6**
(New Zealand) C Newton (Australia) J Walker	4	3
(South Africa) R Fairbank (United States) M-L Piatek	0	4
3	**(Romania) V Ruzici** **(Czechoslovakia) R Tomanová**	**6**	**6**
**(United States) B-A Dent** **(United States) J Newberry**	**7**	5	**6**
(United States) B Hallquist (United States) S McInerney	6	**7**	3
(United States) L Doherty (United States) J Preyer	0	3
2	**(United States) L duPont** **(United States) J Russell**	**6**	**6**

Quarterfinals
(United States) A Henricksson (United States) K Jones	3	5
3	**(Romania) V Ruzici** **(Czechoslovakia) R Tomanová**	**6**	**7**
(United States) B-A Dent (United States) J Newberry	3	3
2	**(United States) L duPont** **(United States) J Russell**	**6**	**6**

Semifinals
3	**(Romania) V Ruzici** **(Czechoslovakia) R Tomanová**	**6**	**6**
2	(United States) L duPont (United States) J Russell	2	4
