= 1980 U.S. Clay Court Championships – Women's singles =

Women's singles
- 1980 U.S. Clay Court Championships

Final
- Champion: (United States) Chris Evert-Lloyd
- Runner-up: (United States) Andrea Jaeger
- Score: 6–4, 6–3

Events
| Singles | men | women |
| Doubles | men | women |
| ← 1979 · | U.S. Clay Court Championships | · 1981 → |

Top-seed Chris Evert-Lloyd won the title for the sixth time, beating fourth-seed Andrea Jaeger in the final for a first-prize of $30,000.

== Seeds ==
The eight seeds received a bye into the second round. A champion seed is indicated in bold text while text in italics indicates the round in which that seed was eliminated.

1. (United States) **Chris Evert-Lloyd (champion)**
2. (Australia) Evonne Cawley (semifinals)
3. (Romania) Virginia Ruzici (third round)
4. (United States) Andrea Jaeger (final)
5. (Czechoslovakia) Regina Maršíková (quarterfinals)
6. (Argentina) Ivanna Madruga (semifinals)
7. (Socialist Federal Republic of Yugoslavia) ~~Mima Jaušovec~~ (withdrew — arm injury)
8. (United States) Laura duPont (second round)

== Draw ==
=== Key ===
- Q = Qualifier
- WC = Wild card
- LL = Lucky loser
- Alt = Alternate
- SE = Special exempt
- PR = Protected ranking
- ITF = ITF entry
- JE = Junior exempt
- w/o = Walkover
- r = Retired
- d = Defaulted
- SR = Special ranking

=== Finals ===
Quarterfinals
1 | **(United States) Chris Evert** | **6** | **6**
Q | (United States) Anne White | 0 | 2
(Switzerland) Hana Strachoňová | 1 | 2
6 | **(Argentina) Ivanna Madruga** | **6** | **6**
(United States) Mary Lou Piatek | 1 | 1
4 | **(United States) Andrea Jaeger** | **6** | **6**
5 | (Czechoslovakia) Regina Maršíková | 5 | 3
2 | **(Australia) Evonne Cawley** | **7** | **6**

Semifinals
1 | **(United States) Chris Evert** | **6** | 3
6 | (Argentina) Ivanna Madruga | 4 | 0^{r}
4 | **(United States) Andrea Jaeger** | **6** | **6**
2 | (Australia) Evonne Cawley | 4 | 2

Final
1 | **(United States) Chris Evert** | **6** | **6**
4 | (United States) Andrea Jaeger | 4 | 3

=== Top half ===
==== Section 1 ====
First round
(United States) J DuVall | 5 | 4
**(United States) J Russell** | **7** | **6**
LL | (Australia) K Gulley | 4 | 1
Q | **(United States) V Beggs** | **6** | **6**
**(Australia) D Evers** | **7** | **6**
LL | (United States) Rita Agassi | 6 | 1
Q | **(United States) S Jaeger** | **6** | **6**
(United States) B-A Dent | 1 | 4
Q | **(United States) A White** | 3 | **6** | **6**
(United States) C Reynolds | **6** | 4 | 1
LL | (Australia) E Little | 0 | **6** | 2
**(United States) D Gilbert** | **6** | 4 | **6**

Second round
1 | **(United States) C Evert** | **6** | **6**
(United States) J Russell | 4 | 4
Q | (United States) V Beggs | **6** | 2 | 1
**(Australia) D Evers** | 1 | **6** | **6**
Q | (United States) S Jaeger | 1 | 0
Q | **(United States) A White** | **6** | **6**
**(United States) D Gilbert** | **6** | **6**
LL | (United States) Michelle Weiss | 3 | 1

Third round
1 | **(United States) C Evert** | **6** | **6**
(Australia) D Evers | 1 | 0
Q | **(United States) A White** | **6** | **6**
(United States) D Gilbert | 4 | 4

Quarterfinals
1 | **(United States) C Evert** | **6** | **6**
Q | (United States) A White | 0 | 2

==== Section 2 ====
First round
(United Kingdom) G Coles | 4 | **7** | 3
**(South Korea) Lee D-h** | **6** | 5 | **6**
LL | (France) S Provoust | 1 | 1
Q | **(France) C Franch** | **6** | **6**
**(Switzerland) H Strachoňová** | **6** | **6**
Q | (United States) Nina Voydat | 2 | 0
(Australia) A Evans | 3 | 4
**(United States) L Forood** | **6** | **6**
(United States) R Richards | 4 | 4
**(United States) P Smith** | **6** | **6**
(United States) R Blount | 2 | 1
**(Australia) S Leo** | **6** | **6**

Second round
3 | **(Romania) V Ruzici** | **6** | 5 | **8**
(South Korea) Lee D-h | 0 | **7** | 6
Q | (France) C Franch | 1 | 2
**(Switzerland) H Strachoňová** | **6** | **6**
**(United States) L Forood** | **6** | **6**
(United States) P Smith | 3 | 4
(Australia) S Leo | 0 | 2
6 | **(Argentina) I Madruga** | **6** | **6**

Third round
3 | (Romania) V Ruzici | 6 | 2
**(Switzerland) H Strachoňová** | **7** | **6**
(United States) L Forood | 0 | 0
6 | **(Argentina) I Madruga** | **6** | **6**

Quarterfinals
(Switzerland) H Strachoňová | 1 | 2
6 | **(Argentina) I Madruga** | **6** | **6**

=== Bottom half ===
==== Section 3 ====
First round
**(South Africa) R Fairbank** | **6** | **6**
(United States) L Doherty | 1 | 4
(United States) B Hallquist | 4 | **6** | 4
**(United States) J Newberry** | **6** | 4 | **6**
LL | (United States) J Preyer | 2 | 1
**(United States) M L Piatek** | **6** | **6**
**(South Africa) Y Vermaak** | **6** | **6**
(United States) F Hutnick | 4 | 0
(Switzerland) C Jolissaint | **7** | 1 | 4
**(United States) A Smith** | 6 | **6** | **6**
(United States) K Sands | 4 | 3
Q | **(United States) A Henricksson** | **6** | **6**

Second round
8 | (United States) L duPont | 3 | 2
**(South Africa) R Fairbank** | **6** | **6**
(United States) J Newberry | 1 | 2
**(United States) M L Piatek** | **6** | **6**
(South Africa) Y Vermaak | **6** | 1 | 0
**(United States) A Smith** | 3 | **6** | **6**
Q | (United States) A Henricksson | 1 | 0
4 | **(United States) A Jaeger** | **6** | **6**

Third round
(South Africa) R Fairbank | **6** | 3 | 5
**(United States) M L Piatek** | 4 | **6** | **7**
(United States) A Smith | 1 | 0
4 | **(United States) A Jaeger** | **6** | **6**

Quarterfinals
(United States) M L Piatek | 1 | 1
4 | **(United States) A Jaeger** | **6** | **6**

==== Section 4 ====
First round
(Japan) N Sato | 1 | 2
**(United States) S Collins** | **6** | **6**
(Argentina) E Raponi | **6** | 3 | 2
**(Australia) S Saliba** | 4 | **6** | **6**
**(Czechoslovakia) R Tomanová** | **6** | **6**
Q | (United States) S McInerney | 2 | 2
(United States) K Jones | 1 | 2
**(Argentina) C Casabianca** | **6** | **6**
(Switzerland) P Delhees | 3 | 3
Q | **(United States) J Portman** | **6** | **6**
**(United States) S Acker** | **6** | **6**
(Belgium) M Gurdal | 4 | 1

Second round
5 | **(Czechoslovakia) R Maršiková** | **7** | **6**
(United States) S Collins | 6 | 4
(Australia) S Saliba | 2 | 2
**(Czechoslovakia) R Tomanová** | **6** | **6**
(Argentina) C Casabianca | 3 | 5
Q | **(United States) J Portman** | **6** | **7**
(United States) S Acker | 4 | 2
2 | **(Australia) E Cawley** | **6** | **6**

Third round
5 | **(Czechoslovakia) R Maršiková** | 2 | **6** | **9**
(Czechoslovakia) R Tomanová | **6** | 3 | 7
Q | (United States) J Portman | 5 | 0
2 | **(Australia) E Cawley** | **7** | **6**

Quarterfinals
5 | (Czechoslovakia) R Maršiková | 5 | 3
2 | **(Australia) E Cawley** | **7** | **6**
