= 1979 U.S. Clay Court Championships =

- Date: August 6–12
- Edition: 11th
- Category: Grand Prix circuit WTA Tour
- Draw: 64S / 32D (men); 48S / 24D (women)
- Prize money: $175,000 (men) $100,000 (women)
- Surface: Clay / outdoor
- Location: Indianapolis, Indiana, US
- Venue: Indianapolis Sports Center

Champions

Men's singles
- (United States) Jimmy Connors

Women's singles
- (United States) Chris Evert-Lloyd

Men's doubles
- (United States) Gene Mayer / (United States) John McEnroe

Women's doubles
- (United States) Kathy Jordan / (United States) Anne Smith
- U.S. Clay Court Championships

The 1979 U.S. Clay Court Championships was a men's Grand Prix and women's Colgate Series tennis tournament. The event was held for the first time at the newly built Indianapolis Sports Center in Indianapolis in the United States and played on outdoor clay courts. It was the 11th edition of the tournament in the Open Era and was held in from August 6 through August 12, 1979. First-seeded Jimmy Connors won the men's singles title and the $25,000 first-prize money. First-seeded Chris Evert-Lloyd claimed the women's singles title and $20,000 first-prize money.

== Finals ==
=== Men's singles ===
(United States) Jimmy Connors defeated (Argentina) Guillermo Vilas 6–1, 2–6, 6–4

=== Women's singles ===
(United States) Chris Evert-Lloyd defeated (Australia) Evonne Goolagong Cawley 6–4, 6–3

=== Men's doubles ===
(United States) Gene Mayer / (United States) John McEnroe defeated (Czechoslovakia) Jan Kodeš / (Czechoslovakia) Tomáš Šmíd 6–4, 7–6

=== Women's doubles ===
(United States) Kathy Jordan / (United States) Anne Smith defeated (United States) Penny Johnson / (United States) Paula Smith 6–1, 6–0
