= 1981 U.S. Clay Court Championships – Men's doubles =

Men's doubles
- 1981 U.S. Clay Court Championships

Final
- Champions: (South Africa) Kevin Curren (United States) Steve Denton
- Runners-up: (Mexico) Raúl Ramírez (United States) Van Winitsky
- Score: 6–3, 5–7, 7–5

Details
- Draw: 32
- Seeds: 8

Events
Singles	men	women
Doubles	men	women
- U.S. Clay Court Championships

Third-seeds Kevin Curren and Steve Denton won the title and shared $12,000 after beating Raúl Ramírez and Van Winitsky in the final.

== Seeds ==
A champion seed is indicated in bold text while text in italics indicates the round in which that seed was eliminated.

1. (Chile) Hans Gildemeister / (Ecuador) Andrés Gómez (quarterfinals)
2. (Mexico) Raúl Ramírez / (United States) Van Winitsky (final)
3. (South Africa) Kevin Curren / (United States) Steve Denton **(champions)**
4. (Australia) Mark Edmondson / (United States) Sherwood Stewart (second round)
5. (United States) Fritz Buehning / (United States) Ferdi Taygan (quarterfinals)
6. (Austria) Peter Feigl / (Sweden) Hans Simonsson (first round)
7. (Australia) David Carter / (Australia) Paul Kronk (first round)
8. (Switzerland) Heinz Günthardt / (Switzerland) Markus Günthardt (quarterfinals)

== Draw ==
Key

- Q = Qualifier
- WC = Wild card
- LL = Lucky loser
- Alt = Alternate
- ITF = ITF entry
- PR = Protected ranking
- SR = Special ranking
- SE = Special exempt
- JE = Junior exempt
- JR = Junior Accelerator Programme entrant
- CO = College Accelerator Programme entrant
- NG = Next Gen Accelerator Program entrant
- w/o = Walkover
- r = Retired
- d = Defaulted

=== Finals ===
Semifinals
(United States) Mike Bauer (United States) John Benson	**7**	2	4
3	**(South Africa) Kevin Curren** **(United States) Steve Denton**	6	**6**	**6**
(Australia) John Alexander (United Kingdom) Jonathan Smith	4	6
2	**(Mexico) Raúl Ramírez** **(United States) Van Winitsky**	**6**	**7**

Final
3	**(South Africa) Kevin Curren** **(United States) Steve Denton**	**6**	5	**7**
2	(Mexico) Raúl Ramírez (United States) Van Winitsky	3	**7**	5

=== Top half ===
First round
1	**(Chile) H Gildemeister** **(Ecuador) A Gómez**	**6**	**6**
(Switzerland) I Dupasquier (Switzerland) R Stadler	2	0
**(United States) T Delatte** **(United States) M Purcell**	**6**	**6**
(Spain) J Higueras (Spain) M Orantes	3	2
**(Sweden) P Hjertquist** **(Sweden) J Norbäck**	**6**	**6**
(United States) M Davis (United States) B Nealon	2	3
**(United States) M Bauer** **(United States) J Benson**	**7**	6	**6**
7	(Australia) D Carter (Australia) P Kronk	5	**7**	4
3	**(South Africa) K Curren** **(United States) S Denton**	**6**	**7**
(United States) G Amaya (United States) Mike Oransky	1	5
**(United States) C Strode** **(United States) M Strode**	**6**	**6**
(Peru) F Maynetto (Chile) J Núñez	1	3
**(Argentina) E Bengoechea** **(Brazil) M Hocevar**	**6**	**6**
(Bolivia) M Martinez (Socialist Federal Republic of Yugoslavia) M Ostoja	0	1
(Philippines) M Ampon (United States) C Delaney	2	5
5	**(United States) F Buehning** **(United States) F Taygan**	**6**	**7**

Second round
1	**(Chile) H Gildemeister** **(Ecuador) A Gómez**	**6**	**6**
(United States) T Delatte (United States) M Purcell	4	4
(Sweden) P Hjertquist (Sweden) J Norbäck	3	4
**(United States) M Bauer** **(United States) J Benson**	**6**	**6**
3	**(South Africa) K Curren** **(United States) S Denton**	**6**	6	**6**
(United States) C Strode (United States) M Strode	3	**7**	3
(Argentina) E Bengoechea (Brazil) M Hocevar	4	5
5	**(United States) F Buehning** **(United States) F Taygan**	**6**	**7**

Quarterfinals
1	(Chile) H Gildemeister (Ecuador) A Gómez	4	3
**(United States) M Bauer** **(United States) J Benson**	**6**	**6**
3	**(South Africa) K Curren** **(United States) S Denton**	4	**7**	**6**
5	(United States) F Buehning (United States) F Taygan	**6**	5	3

Semifinals
(United States) M Bauer (United States) J Benson	**7**	2	4
3	**(South Africa) K Curren** **(United States) S Denton**	6	**6**	**6**

=== Bottom half ===
First round
6	(Austria) P Feigl (Sweden) H Simonsson	6	3
**(Argentina) R Cano** **(Uruguay) JL Damiani**	**7**	**6**
**(Australia) J Alexander** **(United Kingdom) J Smith**	**7**	**7**
(United States) J Gurfein (United States) J Hayes	5	6
**(New Zealand) C Lewis** **(Chile) B Prajoux**	**7**	**6**
(United States) M Cahill (United States) R Van't Hof	6	1
(United States) K Cook (Colombia) A Cortes	2	**6**	3
4	**(Australia) M Edmondson** **(United States) S Stewart**	**6**	2	**6**
8	**(Switzerland) H Günthardt** **(Switzerland) M Günthardt**	w/o
(United States) Weller Evans (Spain) G Urpí
**(United States) R Fagel** **(South Africa) D Joubert**	**6**	**6**
(Argentina) C Castellan (Argentina) J Todero	2	3
**(Czechoslovakia) S Birner** **(Philippines) B Sison**	**6**	**6**
(Chile) Á Fillol (Spain) J López-Maeso	2	3
(United States) B Gilbert (India) R Krishnan	4	3
2	**(Mexico) R Ramírez** **(United States) V Winitsky**	**6**	**6**

Second round
(Argentina) R Cano (Uruguay) JL Damiani	5	**6**	1
**(Australia) J Alexander** **(United Kingdom) J Smith**	**7**	4	**6**
**(New Zealand) C Lewis** **(Chile) B Prajoux**	**7**	**7**
4	(Australia) M Edmondson (United States) S Stewart	5	5
8	**(Switzerland) H Günthardt** **(Switzerland) M Günthardt**	**6**	4	**6**
(United States) R Fagel (South Africa) D Joubert	4	**6**	0
(Czechoslovakia) S Birner (Philippines) B Sison	6	3
2	**(Mexico) R Ramírez** **(United States) V Winitsky**	**7**	**6**

Quarterfinals
**(Australia) J Alexander** **(United Kingdom) J Smith**	4	**6**	**6**
(New Zealand) C Lewis (Chile) B Prajoux	**6**	2	3
8	(Switzerland) H Günthardt (Switzerland) M Günthardt	4	3
2	**(Mexico) R Ramírez** **(United States) V Winitsky**	**6**	**6**

Semifinals
(Australia) J Alexander (United Kingdom) J Smith	4	6
2	**(Mexico) R Ramírez** **(United States) V Winitsky**	**6**	**7**
