= Linda Siegel (tennis) =

American tennis player

- Country (sports): United States
- Born: June 5, 1961 (age 64); Oakland, California

Singles

Grand Slam singles results
- French Open: 1R (1979)
- Wimbledon: 2R (1979)
- US Open: 1R (1979)

Doubles

Grand Slam doubles results
- French Open: 1R (1979)
- Wimbledon: 2R (1979)
- US Open: 1R (1979)

Linda Siegel (June 5, 1961) is a retired professional tennis player from the United States, known best for playing in a number of Grand Slam tournaments during the late 1970s.

== Biography ==
On June 5, 1961, Siegel was born.

In 1978, Siegel defeated Ivanna Madruga, 6–4, 6–4, to win the US Open girls' singles championship. In the same year, she lost in the final of the South African Open women's singles championship.

=== 1979 Wimbledon controversy ===
On June 27, 1979, having just turned 18 three weeks earlier, Siegel made headlines when she went braless in a low cut tennis dress during her second round match against Billie Jean King at Wimbledon. She was immediately pursued by several photographers, who followed her to her hotel room, asking her to pose in bathing suits and even in the nude. She refused and found the incident so embarrassing that she retired from tennis.

== See also ==
- Billie Jean King
- Ivanna Madruga
