= 1978 Florida Federal Open – Singles =

Singles
- 1978 Florida Federal Open

Final
- Champion: (United Kingdom) Virginia Wade
- Runner-up: (United States) Anna-Maria Fernandez
- Score: 6–4, 7–6^{(7–1)}

Details
- Draw: 32
- Seeds: 0

Events
Singles	Doubles
← 1977 ·	Eckerd Open	· 1979 →

Virginia Ruzici was the defending champion, but did not compete this year.

Virginia Wade won the title by defeating Anna-Maria Fernandez 6–4, 7–6^{(7–1)} in the final.

== Seeds ==
No seeds were declared for this tournament.

== Draw ==
=== Key ===
- Q = Qualifier
- WC = Wild card
- LL = Lucky loser
- Alt = Alternate
- SE = Special exempt
- PR = Protected ranking
- ITF = ITF entry
- JE = Junior exempt
- w/o = Walkover
- r = Retired
- d = Defaulted
- SR = Special ranking

=== Finals ===
Semifinals
(Czechoslovakia) Regina Maršíková	6	0	3
(United Kingdom) Virginia Wade	2	6	6
(Australia) Wendy Turnbull	6	7	0
(United States) Anna-Maria Fernandez	7	5	6

Final
(United Kingdom) Virginia Wade	6	7^{7}
(United States) Anna-Maria Fernandez	4	6^{1}

=== Top half ===
First round
(United States) M Navratilova	6	6
(United States) Z Liess	1	3
(United States) L duPont	1	3
(United States) S Margolin	6	6
(Czechoslovakia) R Maršíková	7	6
(United States) V Ziegenfuss	5	3
(United States) B Norton	6	6
(United States) A Smith	4	4
(United Kingdom) V Wade	6	6
(United States) C Stoll	4	1
(United States) B Nagelsen	6	4	3
(United States) P Teeguarden	0	6	6
(Australia) K Reid	6	6
(United States) C Meyer	3	4
(United States) P Louie Harper	3	2
(United States) B Hallquist	6	6

Second round
(United States) M Navratilova	6	3	6
(United States) S Margolin	2	6	2
(Czechoslovakia) R Maršíková	4	6	6
(United States) B Norton	6	0	1
(United Kingdom) V Wade	6	6
(United States) P Teeguarden	2	1
(Australia) K Reid	6	6
(United States) B Hallquist	4	2

Quarterfinals
(United States) M Navratilova	3	6
(Czechoslovakia) R Maršíková	6	7
(United Kingdom) V Wade	6	7
(Australia) K Reid	3	5

Semifinals
(Czechoslovakia) R Maršíková	6	0	3
(United Kingdom) V Wade	2	6	6

=== Bottom half ===
First round
(United States) L Antonoplis	4	6	6
(United States) R Gerulaitis	6	2	3
(United States) R Blount	6	6
(Netherlands) B Stöve	2	2
(United States) J DuVall	6	6
(United States) S Walsh	3	3
(United States) L Forood	1	1
(Australia) W Turnbull	6	6
(West Germany) B Bunge	6	3	6
(United States) J Evert	4	6	7
(United States) A White	6	6
(United Kingdom) G Coles	2	3
(United States) AM Fernandez	6	6
(Australia) L Hunt	3	1
(United States) Marlie Buehler
(Australia) E Cawley	w/o

Second round
(United States) L Antonoplis	6	6	4
(United States) R Blount	7	3	6
(United States) J DuVall
(Australia) W Turnbull	w/o
(United States) J Evert	0	6
(United States) A White	6	7
(United States) AM Fernandez	w/o
(Australia) E Cawley

Quarterfinals
(United States) R Blount	1	6	2
(Australia) W Turnbull	6	3	6
(United States) A White	5	5
(United States) AM Fernandez	7	7

Semifinals
(Australia) W Turnbull	6	7	0
(United States) AM Fernandez	7	5	6
