= 1978 Florida Federal Open – Doubles =

Doubles
- 1978 Florida Federal Open

Final
- Champions: (United States) Martina Navratilova (United States) Anne Smith
- Runners-up: (Australia) Kerry Reid (Australia) Wendy Turnbull
- Score: 7–6^{(7–4)}, 6–3

Details
- Draw: 16
- Seeds: 0

Events
Singles	Doubles
← 1977 ·	Eckerd Open	· 1979 →

Linky Boshoff and Ilana Kloss were the defending champions, but none competed this year.

Martina Navratilova and Anne Smith won the title by defeating Kerry Reid and Wendy Turnbull 7–6^{(7–4)}, 6–3 in the final.

== Seeds ==
No seeds were declared for this tournament.

== Draw ==
=== Key ===
- Q = Qualifier
- WC = Wild card
- LL = Lucky loser
- Alt = Alternate
- SE = Special exempt
- PR = Protected ranking
- ITF = ITF entry
- JE = Junior exempt
- w/o = Walkover
- r = Retired
- d = Defaulted
- SR = Special ranking

=== Draw ===
First round
(Australia) K Reid (Australia) W Turnbull	6	6
(United States) Sa Stap (United States) Su Stap	1	1
(Australia) L Hunt (Czechoslovakia) R Maršíková	6	7
(United States) B Nagelsen (Netherlands) B Stöve	4	6
(United States) L duPont (United States) S Walsh	5	7	6
(United States) B Hallquist (United States) S McInerney	7	6	3
(United States) P Louie (United States) S Margolin	6	7
(United States) L Forood (United States) P Teeguarden	4	5
(United States) L Antonoplis (United States) C Stoll	6	7
(United States) J Evert (United States) R Blount	3	5
(United States) R Fox (United States) B Norton	6	6
(United States) R Casals (United States) BJ King	1	4
(United Kingdom) G Coles (United States) K Sands	6	3	6
(United States) Z Liess (United States) N Yeargin	3	6	2
(United States) L Allen (United States) A Spex	0	1
(United States) M Navratilova (United States) A Smith	6	6

Quarterfinals
(Australia) K Reid (Australia) W Turnbull	6	6
(Australia) L Hunt (Czechoslovakia) R Maršíková	3	3
(United States) L duPont (United States) S Walsh	6	7
(United States) P Louie (United States) S Margolin	0	6
(United States) L Antonoplis (United States) C Stoll	3	6	7
(United States) R Fox (United States) B Norton	6	1	6
(United Kingdom) G Coles (United States) K Sands	0	3
(United States) M Navratilova (United States) A Smith	6	6

Semifinals
(Australia) K Reid (Australia) W Turnbull	6	6
(United States) L duPont (United States) S Walsh	2	2
(United States) L Antonoplis (United States) C Stoll	4	4
(United States) M Navratilova (United States) A Smith	6	6

Final
(Australia) K Reid (Australia) W Turnbull	6^{4}	3
(United States) M Navratilova (United States) A Smith	7^{7}	6
