= 1985 Florida Federal Open – Singles =

Singles
- 1985 Florida Federal Open

Final
- Champion: (United States) Stephanie Rehe
- Runner-up: (Argentina) Gabriela Sabatini
- Score: 6–4, 6–7^{(4–7)}, 7–5

Details
- Draw: 32 (4Q)
- Seeds: 8

Events
Singles	Doubles
← 1984 ·	Eckerd Open	· 1986 →

Michelle Torres was the defending champion, but lost in the quarterfinals to Stephanie Rehe.

Rehe won the title by defeating Gabriela Sabatini 6–4, 6–7^{(4–7)}, 7–5 in the final.

== Seeds ==
1. (United States) Bonnie Gadusek (second round)
2. (n/a)
3. (Argentina) Gabriela Sabatini (final)
4. (Canada) Carling Bassett-Seguso (semifinals)
5. (United States) Peanut Louie Harper (second round)
6. (United States) Kate Gompert (first round)
7. (United States) Terry Phelps (second round)
8. (United States) Stephanie Rehe (champion)

== Draw ==
=== Key ===
- Q = Qualifier
- WC = Wild card
- LL = Lucky loser
- Alt = Alternate
- ITF = ITF entry
- PR = Protected ranking
- SR = Special ranking
- SE = Special exempt
- JE = Junior exempt
- JR = Junior Accelerator Programme entrant
- CO = College Accelerator Programme entrant
- NG = Next Gen Accelerator Program entrant
- w/o = Walkover
- r = Retired
- d = Defaulted

=== Finals ===
Semifinals
(United States) Anne White	1	2
3	(Argentina) Gabriela Sabatini	6	6
4	(Canada) Carling Bassett-Seguso	6	4	4
8	(United States) Stephanie Rehe	4	6	6

Final
3	(Argentina) Gabriela Sabatini	4	7^{7}	5
8	(United States) Stephanie Rehe	6	6^{4}	7

=== Top half ===
First round
1	(United States) B Gadusek	6	6
(United States) C Kuhlman	3	3
(United States) L Bonder	6	6
Q	(United States) S Foltz	1	3
(United States) A White	7	6
(United States) LA Thompson	5	1
Q	(Argentina) M Paz	3	3
5	(United States) P Louie Harper	6	6
3	(Argentina) G Sabatini	6	4	6
(United States) M Gurney	1	6	2
(United States) V Nelson-Dunbar	6	6
(United States) C Benjamin	3	2
(United States) P Casale	6	6
Q	(United States) MJ Fernández	2	3
(Argentina) G Mosca	1	0
7	(United States) T Phelps	6	6

Second round
1	(United States) B Gadusek	6	1	1
(United States) L Bonder	3	6	6
(United States) A White	6	6
5	(United States) P Louie Harper	3	2
3	(Argentina) G Sabatini	6	6
(United States) V Nelson-Dunbar	4	1
(United States) P Casale	6	7
7	(United States) T Phelps	4	6

Quarterfinals
(United States) L Bonder	2	4
(United States) A White	6	6
3	(Argentina) G Sabatini	6	6
(United States) P Casale	1	0

Semifinals
(United States) A White	1	2
3	(Argentina) G Sabatini	6	6

=== Bottom half ===
First round
6	(United States) K Gompert	6	3	2
(United States) G Kim	2	6	6
(United States) B Herr	3	6	0
(United States) D Spence	6	4	6
Q	(United States) J Forman	3	1
(Peru) L Gildemeister	6	6
(United States) K McDonald	1	3
4	(Canada) C Bassett-Seguso	6	6
8	(United States) S Rehe	6	6
(United States) C Fernandez-Parker	4	2
(United States) ML Daniels	6	6
(United States) K Horvath	3	1
(Argentina) A Villagrán	5	6	6
(Canada) H Kelesi	7	1	2
(United States) M Torres	6	6
(United States) A Holton	1	1

Second round
(United States) G Kim	6	6
(United States) D Spence	3	1
(Peru) L Gildemeister	4	4
4	(Canada) C Bassett-Seguso	6	6
8	(United States) S Rehe	7	6
(United States) ML Daniels	5	2
(Argentina) A Villagrán	7	5	5
(United States) M Torres	6	7	7

Quarterfinals
(United States) G Kim	2	5
4	(Canada) C Bassett-Seguso	6	7
8	(United States) S Rehe	6	6
(United States) M Torres	1	2

Semifinals
4	(Canada) C Bassett-Seguso	6	4	4
8	(United States) S Rehe	4	6	6
