= 1982 Florida Federal Open =

- Date: October 11 – 17
- Edition: 10th
- Draw: 32S / 16D
- Prize money: $125,000
- Surface: Hard / outdoors
- Location: Tampa, Florida, U.S.
- Venue: East Lake Woodlands Racquet Club

Champions

Singles
- (United States) Chris Evert-Lloyd

Doubles
- (United States) Ann Kiyomura / (United States) Paula Smith
← 1981 ·	Florida Federal Open	· 1983 →

The 1982 Florida Federal Open was a women's tennis tournament played on outdoor hard courts at the East Lake Woodlands Racquet Club in Tampa, Florida in the United States that was part of the Toyota Series circuit of the 1982 WTA Tour. It was the 10th edition of the tournament and was held from October 11 through October 17, 1982. The final was watched by a crowd of 6,150 spectators who saw first-seeded Chris Evert-Lloyd win the singles title and earn $22,000 first-prize money.

== Finals ==
=== Singles ===
(United States) Chris Evert-Lloyd defeated (United States) Andrea Jaeger 3–6, 6–1, 6–4

- It was Evert-Lloyd's 8th singles title of the year and the 118th of her career.

=== Doubles ===
(United States) Ann Kiyomura / (United States) Paula Smith defeated (United States) Mary-Lou Piatek / (United States) Wendy White-Prausa 6–0, 6–1

== Prize money ==
Event	W	F	SF	QF	Round of 16	Round of 32
Singles	$22,000	$11,000	$5,775	$2,800	$1,450	$725
