= 1996 Comcast U.S. Indoor – Singles =

Singles
- 1996 Comcast U.S. Indoor

Final
- Champion: (United States) Jim Courier
- Runner-up: (United States) Chris Woodruff
- Score: 6–4, 6–3

Details
- Draw: 32
- Seeds: 8

Events
Singles	Doubles
← 1995 ·	U.S. Pro Indoor	· 1997 →

Thomas Enqvist was the defending champion but lost in the second round to Tomás Carbonell.

Jim Courier won in the final 6–4, 6–3 against Chris Woodruff.

== Seeds ==
1. (Sweden) Thomas Enqvist (second round)
2. (United States) Jim Courier (champion)
3. (South Africa) Wayne Ferreira (first round)
4. (Chile) Marcelo Ríos (quarterfinals)
5. (Australia) Mark Philippoussis (first round)
6. (Australia) Mark Woodforde (semifinals)
7. (Australia) Todd Woodbridge (semifinals)
8. (Zimbabwe) Byron Black (quarterfinals)

== Draw ==
=== Key ===
- Q = Qualifier
- WC = Wild card
- LL = Lucky loser
- Alt = Alternate
- ITF = ITF entry
- PR = Protected ranking
- SR = Special ranking
- SE = Special exempt
- JE = Junior exempt
- JR = Junior Accelerator Programme entrant
- CO = College Accelerator Programme entrant
- NG = Next Gen Accelerator Program entrant
- w/o = Walkover
- r = Retired
- d = Defaulted

=== Finals ===
Semifinals
7	(Australia) Todd Woodbridge	4	4
Q	(United States) Chris Woodruff	6	6
6	(Australia) Mark Woodforde	2	1
2	(United States) Jim Courier	6	6

Final
Q	(United States) Chris Woodruff	4	3
2	(United States) Jim Courier	6	6

=== Top half ===
First round
1	(Sweden) T Enqvist	5	6	7
WC	(Sweden) S Edberg	7	2	5
(Spain) T Carbonell	6	7
(Brazil) F Meligeni	2	5
Q	(United States) V Spadea	6	6
(Netherlands) P Haarhuis	0	2
(Slovakia) K Kučera	6^{8}	6^{0}
7	(Australia) T Woodbridge	7^{10}	7^{7}
4	(Chile) M Ríos	6	6
(United States) D Wheaton	4	3
(Japan) S Matsuoka	2	3
Q	(South Africa) G Stafford	6	6
(United Kingdom) G Rusedski	4	6	1
WC	(United States) M Joyce	6	1	6
Q	(United States) C Woodruff	7	4	6
5	(Australia) M Philippoussis	5	6	4

Second round
1	(Sweden) T Enqvist	6	6^{5}	3
(Spain) T Carbonell	2	7^{7}	6
Q	(United States) V Spadea	6^{4}	7^{7}	4
7	(Australia) T Woodbridge	7^{7}	6^{1}	6
4	(Chile) M Ríos	4	6	6
Q	(South Africa) G Stafford	6	4	4
WC	(United States) M Joyce	4	4
Q	(United States) C Woodruff	6	6

Quarterfinals
(Spain) T Carbonell	4	3
7	(Australia) T Woodbridge	6	6
4	(Chile) M Ríos	6	4	1
Q	(United States) C Woodruff	1	6	6

Semifinals
7	(Australia) T Woodbridge	4	4
Q	(United States) C Woodruff	6	6

=== Bottom half ===
First round
6	(Australia) M Woodforde	7	6^{3}	6
(Spain) C Moyá	5	7^{7}	1
(Czech Republic) J Novák	6	6
(United States) A Krickstein	0	2
(New Zealand) B Steven	4	6	6^{4}
(United States) R Reneberg	6	1	7^{7}
(Australia) J Stoltenberg	5	6	6
3	(South Africa) W Ferreira	7	1	2
8	(Zimbabwe) B Black	7	6
WC	(United States) L Jensen	5	3
(Sweden) M Wilander	4	6	4
(Australia) S Draper	6	3	6
Q	(France) L Roux	7	2	3
(Spain) C Costa	5	6	6
(United States) J Tarango	1	1
2	(United States) J Courier	6	6

Second round
6	(Australia) M Woodforde	7^{7}	7
(Czech Republic) J Novák	6^{5}	5
(United States) R Reneberg	6	6^{7}	5
(Australia) J Stoltenberg	1	7^{9}	7
8	(Zimbabwe) B Black	6	6
(Australia) S Draper	4	3
(Spain) C Costa	6^{5}	4
2	(United States) J Courier	7^{7}	6

Quarterfinals
6	(Australia) M Woodforde	7^{7}	5	6
(Australia) J Stoltenberg	6^{5}	7	2
8	(Zimbabwe) B Black	2	4
2	(United States) J Courier	6	6

Semifinals
6	(Australia) M Woodforde	2	1
2	(United States) J Courier	6	6
