= 1981 Florida Federal Open =

- Date: October 5–11
- Edition: 9th
- Category: Category 4
- Draw: 32S / 16D
- Prize money: $125,000
- Surface: Hard / outdoors
- Location: Tampa, Florida, U.S.
- Venue: East Lake Woodlands Racquet Club

Champions

Singles
- (United States) Martina Navratilova

Doubles
- (United States) Rosie Casals / (Australia) Wendy Turnbull
← 1980 ·	Florida Federal Open	· 1982 →

The 1981 Florida Federal Open was a women's tennis tournament played on outdoor hard courts at the East Lake Woodlands Racquet Club in Tampa, Florida in the United States that was part of the Toyota Series circuit of the 1981 WTA Tour and classified as category 4. It was the ninth edition of the tournament and was held from October 5 through October 11, 1981. First-seeded Martina Navratilova won the singles title and earned $22,000 first-prize money.

== Finals ==
=== Singles ===
(United States) Martina Navratilova defeated (West Germany) Bettina Bunge 5–7, 6–2, 6–0

- It was Navratilova's 8th singles title of the year and the 53rd of her career.

=== Doubles ===
(United States) Rosie Casals / (Australia) Wendy Turnbull defeated (United States) Martina Navratilova / (Czechoslovakia) Renáta Tomanová 6–3, 6–4

== Prize money ==
Event	W	F	SF	QF	Round of 16	Round of 32
Singles	$22,000	$11,000	$5,500	$2,800	$1,500	$750
