= 1998 Advanta Championships =

- Date: February 23 – March 2
- Edition: 31st
- Category: Championship Series
- Draw: 32S /16D
- Prize money: $589,250
- Surface: Hard / indoor
- Location: Philadelphia, PA, United States
- Venue: CoreStates Center
- Attendance: 30,420

Champions

Singles
- (United States) Pete Sampras

Doubles
- (Netherlands) Jacco Eltingh / (Netherlands) Paul Haarhuis
← 1997 ·	U.S. Pro Indoor

The 1998 Advanta Championships, also known as the U.S. Pro Indoor, was a men's tennis tournament played on indoor hard courts that was part of the Championship Series of the 1998 ATP Tour. It was the 31st and last edition of the tournament and was played at the CoreStates Center in Philadelphia, Pennsylvania in the United States from February 23 to March 2, 1998. First-seeded Pete Sampras won his second consecutive singles title at the event and his fourth in total.

== Finals ==
=== Singles ===
(United States) Pete Sampras defeated (Sweden) Thomas Enqvist 7–5, 7–6^{(7–3)}

- It was Sampras' 1st singles title of the year and the 53rd of his career.

=== Doubles ===
(Netherlands) Jacco Eltingh / (Netherlands) Paul Haarhuis defeated (Australia) David Macpherson / (United States) Richey Reneberg 7–6, 6–7, 6–2

- It was Eltingh's 2nd title of the year and the 40th of his career. It was Haarhuis' 1st title of the year and the 38th of his career.
