= 1985 Florida Federal Open =

- Date: November 4–10
- Edition: 13th
- Draw: 32S / 16D
- Prize money: $150,000
- Surface: Hard / outdoor
- Location: Largo, Florida, U.S.
- Venue: Bardmoor Country Club
- Attendance: ~26,000

Champions

Singles
- (United States) Stephanie Rehe

Doubles
- (Canada) Carling Bassett / (Argentina) Gabriela Sabatini
| ← 1984 · | Florida Federal Open | · 1986 → |

The 1985 Florida Federal Open was a women's tennis tournament played on outdoor hard courts at the Bardmoor Country Club in Largo, Florida in the United States and was part of the 1985 Virginia Slims World Championship Series. It was the 13th edition of the tournament and was held from November 4 through November 10, 1985. Eighth-seeded Stephanie Rehe won the singles title and earned $27,000 first-prize money.

== Finals ==
=== Singles ===
(United States) Stephanie Rehe defeated (Argentina) Gabriela Sabatini 6–4, 6–7^{(4–7)}, 7–5

- It was Rehe's 2nd singles title of the year and of her career.

=== Doubles ===
(Canada) Carling Bassett / (Argentina) Gabriela Sabatini defeated (United States) Lisa Bonder / (Peru) Laura Gildemeister 6–0, 6–0
