= 1974 Barnett Bank Masters =

- Date: April 15–21
- Edition: 4th
- Category: Virginia Slims
- Draw: 32S / 16D
- Prize money: $45,000
- Surface: Clay (green) / outdoor
- Location: St. Petersburg, Florida, U.S.
- Venue: Bartlett Park Tennis Center

Champions

Singles
- (United States) Chris Evert

Doubles
- (Soviet Union) Olga Morozova / (Netherlands) Betty Stöve
← 1973 ·	Eckerd Open	· 1977 →

The 1974 Barnett Bank Masters was a women's singles tennis tournament played on outdoor green clay courts at the Bartlett Park Tennis Center in St. Petersburg, Florida in the United States. The event was part of the 1974 Virginia Slims Series. It was the fourth edition of the tournament and was held from April 15 through April 21, 1974. First-seeded Chris Evert won the singles title and earned $9,000 first-prize money.

== Finals ==
=== Singles ===
(United States) Chris Evert defeated (Australia) Kerry Melville 6–0, 6–1

- It was Evert's 5th singles title of the year and the 28th of her career.

=== Doubles ===
(Soviet Union) Olga Morozova / (Netherlands) Betty Stöve defeated (United States) Chris Evert / (Australia) Evonne Goolagong 6–4, 6–2

== Prize money ==
Event	W	F	SF	QF	Round of 16	Round of 32
Singles	$9,000	$5,040	$2,520	$1,260	$630	$315

== See also ==
- 1974 St. Petersburg WCT - men's tournament in St. Petersburg
