= 1996 Comcast U.S. Indoor – Doubles =

Doubles
- 1996 Comcast U.S. Indoor

Final
- Champions: (Australia) Todd Woodbridge (Australia) Mark Woodforde
- Runners-up: (Zimbabwe) Byron Black (Canada) Grant Connell
- Score: 7–6, 6–2

Details
- Draw: 16
- Seeds: 4

Events
Singles	Doubles
← 1995 ·	Comcast U.S. Indoor	· 1997 →

Jim Grabb and Jonathan Stark were the defending champions but only Grabb competed that year with Richey Reneberg.

Grabb and Reneberg lost in the first round to Todd Woodbridge and Mark Woodforde.

Woodbridge and Woodforde won in the final 7–6, 6–2 against Byron Black and Grant Connell.

== Seeds ==
1. (Australia) Todd Woodbridge / (Australia) Mark Woodforde (champions)
2. (United States) Patrick Galbraith / (Netherlands) Paul Haarhuis (semifinals)
3. (Zimbabwe) Byron Black / (Canada) Grant Connell (final)
4. (United States) Rick Leach / (United States) Scott Melville (semifinals)

== Draw ==
=== Key ===
- Q = Qualifier
- WC = Wild card
- LL = Lucky loser
- Alt = Alternate
- ITF = ITF entry
- PR = Protected ranking
- SR = Special ranking
- SE = Special exempt
- JE = Junior exempt
- JR = Junior Accelerator Programme entrant
- CO = College Accelerator Programme entrant
- NG = Next Gen Accelerator Program entrant
- w/o = Walkover
- r = Retired
- d = Defaulted

First round
1	(Australia) T Woodbridge (Australia) M Woodforde	7	6	6
(United States) J Grabb (United States) R Reneberg	5	7	4
(United States) M Keil (United States) J Tarango	5	3
(Czech Republic) J Novák (Czech Republic) D Rikl	7	6
4	(United States) R Leach (United States) S Melville	6	6
(United States) K Kinnear (United States) D Randall	3	4
WC	(United States) D DiLucia (United States) V Spadea	3	2
Q	(Netherlands) T Nijssen (United States) G Van Emburgh	6	6
WC	(United States) J Courier (Sweden) T Enqvist	6	4
(South Africa) W Ferreira (New Zealand) B Steven	7	6
(Spain) T Carbonell (Spain) F Roig	3	2
3	(Zimbabwe) B Black (Canada) G Connell	6	6
(United States) L Jensen (United States) M Jensen	7	7
WC	(United States) K Thorne (United States) C Woodruff	5	6
(United States) T Kronemann (Australia) D Macpherson	7	3	6
2	(United States) P Galbraith (Netherlands) P Haarhuis	6	6	7

Quarterfinals
1	(Australia) T Woodbridge (Australia) M Woodforde	6	6
(Czech Republic) J Novák (Czech Republic) D Rikl	4	4
4	(United States) R Leach (United States) S Melville	6	6
Q	(Netherlands) T Nijssen (United States) G Van Emburgh	3	4
(South Africa) W Ferreira (New Zealand) B Steven	3	3
3	(Zimbabwe) B Black (Canada) G Connell	6	6
(United States) L Jensen (United States) M Jensen	1	5
2	(United States) P Galbraith (Netherlands) P Haarhuis	6	7

Semifinals
1	(Australia) T Woodbridge (Australia) M Woodforde	6	6
4	(United States) R Leach (United States) S Melville	3	4
3	(Zimbabwe) B Black (Canada) G Connell	7	1	6
2	(United States) P Galbraith (Netherlands) P Haarhuis	6	6	3

Final
1	(Australia) T Woodbridge (Australia) M Woodforde	7	6
3	(Zimbabwe) B Black (Canada) G Connell	6	2
