= 1998 Advanta Championships – Doubles =

Doubles
- 1998 Advanta Championships

Final
- Champions: (Netherlands) Jacco Eltingh (Netherlands) Paul Haarhuis
- Runners-up: (Australia) David Macpherson (United States) Richey Reneberg
- Score: 7–6, 6–7, 6–2

Details
- Draw: 16 (2WC/1Q)
- Seeds: 4

Events
Singles	Doubles
← 1997 ·	U.S. Pro Indoor

Sébastien Lareau and Alex O'Brien were the defending champions, but O'Brien did not participate this year. Lareau partnered Jeff Tarango, losing in the first round.

Jacco Eltingh and Paul Haarhuis won the title, defeating David Macpherson and Richey Reneberg 7–6, 6–7, 6–2 in the final.

== Seeds ==
1. (Netherlands) Jacco Eltingh / (Netherlands) Paul Haarhuis (champions)
2. (Argentina) Luis Lobo / (Spain) Javier Sánchez (quarterfinals)
3. (Australia) Sandon Stolle / (Czech Republic) Cyril Suk (quarterfinals)
4. (Zimbabwe) Byron Black / (South Africa) Ellis Ferreira (semifinals)

== Draw ==
=== Key ===
- Q = Qualifier
- WC = Wild card
- LL = Lucky loser
- Alt = Alternate
- ITF = ITF entry
- PR = Protected ranking
- SR = Special ranking
- SE = Special exempt
- JE = Junior exempt
- JR = Junior Accelerator Programme entrant
- CO = College Accelerator Programme entrant
- NG = Next Gen Accelerator Program entrant
- w/o = Walkover
- r = Retired
- d = Defaulted

=== Draw ===
First round
1	(Netherlands) J Eltingh (Netherlands) P Haarhuis	6	6
(Zimbabwe) W Black (United States) J Salzenstein	4	3
(Canada) S Lareau (United States) J Tarango	5	4
(United States) J Courier (The Bahamas) M Knowles	7	6
3	(Australia) S Stolle (Czech Republic) C Suk	5	6	6
WC	(United States) G Grant (The Bahamas) M Merklein	7	3	3
(United States) D Randall (United States) J Waite	5	6	5
(Mexico) D Roditi (South Africa) G Stafford	7	4	7
(Spain) J Alonso (Brazil) F Meligeni	3	6
Q	(United States) M Keil (United States) TJ Middleton	6	7
(Ecuador) N Lapentti (Argentina) D Orsanic	3	4
4	(Zimbabwe) B Black (South Africa) E Ferreira	6	6
(Australia) D Macpherson (United States) R Reneberg	7	6
(United States) L Jensen (United States) M Jensen	6	3
WC	(United States) D DiLucia (United States) M Sell	4	4
2	(Argentina) L Lobo (Spain) J Sánchez	6	6

Quarterfinals
1	(Netherlands) J Eltingh (Netherlands) P Haarhuis	6	6
(United States) J Courier (The Bahamas) M Knowles	2	4
3	(Australia) S Stolle (Czech Republic) C Suk	4	6	4
(Mexico) D Roditi (South Africa) G Stafford	6	3	6
Q	(United States) M Keil (United States) TJ Middleton	2	3
4	(Zimbabwe) B Black (South Africa) E Ferreira	6	6
(Australia) D Macpherson (United States) R Reneberg	6	6
2	(Argentina) L Lobo (Spain) J Sánchez	1	2

Semifinals
1	(Netherlands) J Eltingh (Netherlands) P Haarhuis	6	6
(Mexico) D Roditi (South Africa) G Stafford	2	4
4	(Zimbabwe) B Black (South Africa) E Ferreira	6	7	6
(Australia) D Macpherson (United States) R Reneberg	7	6	7

Final
1	(Netherlands) J Eltingh (Netherlands) P Haarhuis	7	6	6
(Australia) D Macpherson (United States) R Reneberg	6	7	2

== Qualifying ==
=== Qualifying seeds ===
1. (United States) Mark Keil / (United States) T. J. Middleton (qualified)
2. (Sweden) Tomas Nydahl / (Italy) Davide Sanguinetti (first round)

=== Qualifiers ===
1. (United States) Mark Keil / (United States) T. J. Middleton

=== Qualifying draw ===
First round
1	(United States) Mark Keil (United States) T. J. Middleton	7	6
(Argentina) Guillermo Cañas (Paraguay) Ramón Delgado	6	3
WC	(Spain) Joan Balcells (Italy) Andrea Gaudenzi	7	7
2	(Sweden) Tomas Nydahl (Italy) Davide Sanguinetti	5	6

Qualifying competition
1	(United States) Mark Keil (United States) T. J. Middleton	6	6
WC	(Spain) Joan Balcells (Italy) Andrea Gaudenzi	3	4
