= 1980 Florida Federal Open =

- Date: November 10–16
- Edition: 8th
- Category: Category AAA
- Draw: 56S / 27D
- Prize money: $125,000
- Surface: Hard / outdoors
- Location: Tampa, Florida, U.S.
- Venue: East Lake Woodlands Racquet Club

Champions

Singles
- (United States) Andrea Jaeger

Doubles
- (United States) Rosie Casals / (United States) Candy Reynolds
← 1979 ·	Florida Federal Open	· 1981 →

The 1980 Florida Federal Open was a women's tennis tournament played on outdoor hard courts at the East Lake Woodlands Racquet Club in Tampa, Florida in the United States that was part of the Colgate Series circuit of the 1980 WTA Tour and classified as category AAA. It was the eighth edition of the tournament and was held from November 10 through November 16, 1980. Second-seeded Andrea Jaeger won the singles title and earned $22,000 first-prize money after first-seeded Tracy Austin withdrew before the final with an injury to her left hamstring.

== Finals ==
=== Singles ===
(United States) Andrea Jaeger defeated (United States) Tracy Austin walkover

- It was Jaeger's 4th singles title of the year and of her career.

=== Doubles ===
(United States) Rosie Casals / (United States) Candy Reynolds defeated (United States) Anne Smith / (United States) Paula Smith 7–6, 7–5

== Prize money ==
Event	W	F	SF	QF	Round of 16	Round of 32	Round of 64
Singles	$22,000	$11,000	$5,875	$2,800	$1,400	$700	$350
