= Cacopardo =

Cacopardo is a surname. Notable people with the surname include:

- Carmel Cacopardo (born 1956), Maltese architect, civil engineer, and politician
- Marco Cacopardo (born 1969), American tennis player
