= 1998 Advanta Championships – Singles =

Singles
- 1998 Advanta Championships

Final
- Champion: (United States) Pete Sampras
- Runner-up: (Sweden) Thomas Enqvist
- Score: 7–5, 7–6^{(7–3)}

Details
- Draw: 32 (3WC/4Q/1LL)
- Seeds: 8

Events
Singles	Doubles
← 1997 ·	U.S. Pro Indoor

Pete Sampras was the defending champion.

Sampras successfully defended his title, beating Thomas Enqvist 7–5, 7–6^{(7–3)} in the final.

== Seeds ==
1. (United States) Pete Sampras (champion)
2. (Chile) ~~Marcelo Ríos~~ (withdrew)
3. (Sweden) Thomas Enqvist (final)
4. (Spain) Julián Alonso (first round)
5. (United States) Jim Courier (second round)
6. (Germany) Tommy Haas (semifinals)
7. (Australia) Richard Fromberg (first round)
8. (Netherlands) Sjeng Schalken (quarterfinals)
9. (Zimbabwe) Byron Black (first round)

== Draw ==
=== Key ===
- Q = Qualifier
- WC = Wild card
- LL = Lucky loser
- Alt = Alternate
- SE = Special exempt
- PR = Protected ranking
- ITF = ITF entry
- JE = Junior exempt
- w/o = Walkover
- r = Retired
- d = Defaulted
- SR = Special ranking

=== Finals ===
Semifinals
1	(United States) Pete Sampras	6	6
6	(Germany) Tommy Haas	4	4
3	(Sweden) Thomas Enqvist	6	3	6
Q	(Canada) Sébastien Lareau	3	6	3

Final
1	(United States) Pete Sampras	7	7^{7}
3	(Sweden) Thomas Enqvist	5	6^{3}

=== Top half ===
First round
1	(United States) P Sampras	4	6	7
Q	(Belgium) X Malisse	6	3	5
(Italy) D Sanguinetti	6	4	3
(Italy) A Gaudenzi	4	6	6
WC	(Russia) M Safin	6	2	6
Q	(Zimbabwe) W Black	1	6	3
WC	(United States) J Salzenstein	3	6	6^{5}
8	(Netherlands) S Schalken	6	4	7^{7}
4	(Spain) J Alonso	1	7^{7}	3
WC	(United States) J Stark	6	6^{5}	6
Q	(Australia) S Stolle	5	1
(United States) J Tarango	7	6
(Spain) JA Viloca-Puig	6^{5}	4
(Brazil) F Meligeni	7^{7}	6
(United States) V Spadea	3	2
6	(Germany) T Haas	6	6

Second round
1	(United States) P Sampras	7^{8}	6
(Italy) A Gaudenzi	6^{6}	3
WC	(Russia) M Safin	2	6	6^{1}
8	(Netherlands) S Schalken	6	4	7^{7}
WC	(United States) J Stark	2	7^{7}	3
(United States) J Tarango	6	6^{4}	6
(Brazil) F Meligeni	0^{r}
6	(Germany) T Haas	3

Quarterfinals
1	(United States) P Sampras	6	6
8	(Netherlands) S Schalken	2	2
(United States) J Tarango	6	4	4
6	(Germany) T Haas	4	6	6

Semifinals
1	(United States) P Sampras	6	6
6	(Germany) T Haas	4	4

=== Bottom half ===
First round
9	(Zimbabwe) B Black	4	6^{3}
(United States) T Martin	6	7^{7}
(United States) R Reneberg	6	6
(Spain) J Burillo	3	1
(Germany) M Craca	6	6
(Ecuador) N Lapentti	4	4
LL	(Spain) E Benfele Álvarez	4	3
3	(Sweden) T Enqvist	6	6
7	(Australia) R Fromberg	6^{4}	6^{4}
(South Africa) G Stafford	7^{7}	7^{7}
(Spain) J Sánchez	3	4
(Netherlands) P Haarhuis	6	6
Q	(Canada) S Lareau	6	6
(Sweden) T Nydahl	4	3
(Norway) C Ruud	7^{8}	4	4
5	(United States) J Courier	6^{6}	6	6

Second round
(United States) T Martin	4	5
(United States) R Reneberg	6	7
(Germany) M Craca	6	6^{2}	2
3	(Sweden) T Enqvist	4	7^{7}	6
(South Africa) G Stafford	6	6
(Netherlands) P Haarhuis	3	4
Q	(Canada) S Lareau	7^{7}	7
5	(United States) J Courier	6^{5}	5

Quarterfinals
(United States) R Reneberg	4	6^{1}
3	(Sweden) T Enqvist	6	7^{7}
(South Africa) G Stafford	4	3
Q	(Canada) S Lareau	6	6

Semifinals
3	(Sweden) T Enqvist	6	3	6
Q	(Canada) S Lareau	3	6	3

== Qualifying ==
=== Qualifying seeds ===
1. (Zimbabwe) Wayne Black (qualified)
2. (Australia) Sandon Stolle (qualified)
3. (Spain) Emilio Benfele Álvarez (qualifying competition, Lucky loser)
4. (Canada) Daniel Nestor (first round)
5. (Australia) Michael Tebbutt (first round)
6. (Netherlands) John van Lottum (qualifying competition)
7. (Paraguay) Ramón Delgado (first round)
8. (United States) Steve Campbell (qualifying competition)

=== Qualifiers ===
1. (Zimbabwe) Wayne Black
2. (Australia) Sandon Stolle
3. (Canada) Sébastien Lareau
4. (Belgium) Xavier Malisse

=== Lucky loser ===
1. (Spain) Emilio Benfele Álvarez

=== Qualifying draw ===
==== First qualifier ====
First round				Qualifying competition
1	(Zimbabwe) Wayne Black	7	6
	(Argentina) Guillermo Cañas	6	3	1	(Zimbabwe) Wayne Black	6	4	7
	(Brazil) Jaime Oncins	6	6		(Brazil) Jaime Oncins	4	6	6
7	(Paraguay) Ramón Delgado	2	2

==== Second qualifier ====
First round				Qualifying competition
2	(Australia) Sandon Stolle	6	6
	(United States) Michael Sell	1	2	2	(Australia) Sandon Stolle	6	6	6
WC	(United States) Steven Capriati	2	1	8	(United States) Steve Campbell	1	7	1
8	(United States) Steve Campbell	6	6

==== Third qualifier ====
First round				Qualifying competition
3	(Spain) Emilio Benfele Álvarez	6	7
WC	(The Bahamas) Mark Knowles	4	6	3	(Spain) Emilio Benfele Álvarez	4	4
	(Canada) Sébastien Lareau	6	6		(Canada) Sébastien Lareau	6	6
5	(Australia) Michael Tebbutt	4	0

==== Fourth qualifier ====
First round					Qualifying competition
4	(Canada) Daniel Nestor	3	0
WC	(Belgium) Xavier Malisse	6	6		WC	(Belgium) Xavier Malisse	6	7
	(Germany) Christian Vinck	1	6	3	6	(Netherlands) John van Lottum	3	5
6	(Netherlands) John van Lottum	6	2	6
