= 1973 St. Petersburg Masters Invitation =

- Date: April 16–22
- Edition: 3rd
- Category: Grand Prix (USLTA) circuit
- Draw: 32S / 16D
- Prize money: $18,800
- Surface: Clay (green) / outdoor
- Location: St. Petersburg, Florida, U.S.
- Venue: St. Petersburg Tennis Center

Champions

Singles
- (United States) Chris Evert

Doubles
- (United States) Chris Evert / (United States) Jeanne Evert
← 1972 ·	Eckerd Open	· 1974 →

The 1973 St. Petersburg Masters Invitation was a women's tennis tournament played on outdoor green clay courts at the St. Petersburg Tennis Center in St. Petersburg, Florida in the United States. The event was part of the USLTA circuit which in turn was part of the Grand Prix circuit. It was the third edition of the tournament and was held from April 16 through April 22, 1973. First-seeded Chris Evert won the singles title and earned $5,000 first-prize money.

== Finals ==
=== Singles ===
(United States) Chris Evert defeated (Australia) Evonne Goolagong 6–2, 0–6, 6–4

- It was Evert's 6th singles title of the year and the 17th of her career.

=== Doubles ===
(United States) Chris Evert / (United States) Jeanne Evert defeated (Australia) Evonne Goolagong / (Australia) Janet Young 6–2, 7–6

== Prize money ==
Event	W	F	SF	QF	Round of 16	Round of 32
Singles	$5,000	$2,500	$1,200	$600	$300	NA
