= 1983 Florida Federal Open – Singles =

Singles
- 1983 Florida Federal Open

Final
- Champion: (United States) Martina Navratilova
- Runner-up: (United States) Pam Shriver
- Score: 6–3, 6–2

Details
- Draw: 32 (4Q)
- Seeds: 8

Events
| Singles | Doubles |
- Eckerd Open

Chris Evert-Lloyd was the defending champion, but did not compete this year.

Martina Navratilova won the title by defeating Pam Shriver 6–3, 6–2 in the final.

== Seeds ==
1. (United States) Martina Navratilova (champion)
2. (United States) Pam Shriver (final)
3. (United States) Zina Garrison (semifinals)
4. (United States) Kathy Rinaldi (semifinals)
5. (Canada) Carling Bassett (first round)
6. (United States) Kathleen Horvath (first round)
7. (United States) Bonnie Gadusek (quarterfinals)
8. (United States) Beth Herr (second round)

== Draw ==
Key

- Q = Qualifier
- WC = Wild card
- LL = Lucky loser
- Alt = Alternate
- ITF = ITF entry
- PR = Protected ranking
- SR = Special ranking
- SE = Special exempt
- JE = Junior exempt
- JR = Junior Accelerator Programme entrant
- CO = College Accelerator Programme entrant
- NG = Next Gen Accelerator Program entrant
- w/o = Walkover
- r = Retired
- d = Defaulted

=== Finals ===
Semifinals
1 | (United States) Martina Navratilova | 6 | 6
3 | (United States) Zina Garrison | 4 | 1
4 | (United States) Kathy Rinaldi | 3 | 3
2 | (United States) Pam Shriver | 6 | 6

Final
1 | (United States) Martina Navratilova | 6 | 6
2 | (United States) Pam Shriver | 3 | 2

=== Top half ===
First round
1 | (United States) M Navratilova | 6 | 6
(United States) P Louie | 1 | 1
(United States) W White | 4 | 6 | 6
(United States) AM Fernandez | 6 | 1 | 4
(United States) P Casale | 6 | 6
Q | (United States) M Brown | 3 | 1
Q | (United States) R White | 1 | 1
7 | (United States) B Gadusek | 6 | 6
3 | (United States) Z Garrison | 6 | 7
(United States) S Rehe | 4 | 6
(United States) K Sands | 6 | 1 | 6
(United States) L Forood | 4 | 6 | 2
(United States) D Spence | 7 | 6
(United States) B Nagelsen | 6 | 1
(United States) M Torres | 7 | 6
5 | (Canada) C Bassett | 5 | 3

Second round
1 | (United States) M Navratilova | 6 | 6
(United States) W White | 3 | 2
(United States) P Casale | 5 | 2
7 | (United States) B Gadusek | 7 | 6
3 | (United States) Z Garrison | 7 | 6
(United States) K Sands | 5 | 3
(United States) D Spence | 7 | 6
(United States) M Torres | 5 | 4

Quarterfinals
1 | (United States) M Navratilova | 7 | 6
7 | (United States) B Gadusek | 5 | 2
3 | (United States) Z Garrison | 6 | 6
(United States) D Spence | 1 | 1

Semifinals
1 | (United States) M Navratilova | 6 | 6
3 | (United States) Z Garrison | 4 | 1

=== Bottom half ===
First round
6 | (United States) K Horvath | 3 | 6 | 2
(United States) E Burgin | 6 | 2 | 6
(United States) N Yeargin | 2 | 6 | 2
(South Africa) J Mundel | 6 | 1 | 6
(United States) L McNeil | 4 | 6 | 2
Q | (United States) P Blackwell | 6 | 1 | 6
Q | (United States) G Fernández | 0 | 4
4 | (United States) K Rinaldi | 6 | 6
8 | (United States) B Herr | 7 | 7
(United States) ML Piatek | 5 | 5
(Italy) R Reggi | 6 | 6
(United States) T Phelps | 1 | 2
(United States) C Benjamin | 3 | 7 | 2
(United States) G Purdy | 6 | 6 | 6
(United States) A Henricksson | 1 | 3
2 | (United States) P Shriver | 6 | 6

Second round
(United States) E Burgin | 7 | 6
(South Africa) J Mundel | 6 | 3
Q | (United States) P Blackwell | 0 | 1
4 | (United States) K Rinaldi | 6 | 6
8 | (United States) B Herr | 3 | 3
(Italy) R Reggi | 6 | 6
(United States) G Purdy | 1 | 0
2 | (United States) P Shriver | 6 | 6

Quarterfinals
(United States) E Burgin | 2 | 3
4 | (United States) K Rinaldi | 6 | 6
(Italy) R Reggi | 6 | 4
2 | (United States) P Shriver | 7 | 6

Semifinals
4 | (United States) K Rinaldi | 3 | 3
2 | (United States) P Shriver | 6 | 6
