= St. Petersburg Masters Invitational =

Defunct tennis tournament
- Event name: Masters Invitational (1953–65); St. Petersburg Masters Invitational (1966–71)
- Tour: ILTF Circuit (1953–1971)
- Founded: 1953; 72 years ago
- Abolished: 1971; 54 years ago
- Location: Tampa Bay Area, Florida, U.S.
- Surface: Clay (1953–1971)

The St. Petersburg Masters Invitational was an ILTF Circuit affiliated combined men's and women's clay court tennis tournament founded in 1953 as the Masters Invitational in St Augustine, Florida. In 1954 that event moved to Jacksonville, Florida until 1959. In 1960 the event moved to St Petersburg. It remained at the former location until 1971. After the men's event St Petersburg Masters Invitational was discontinued in 1971 the women's event continued as the Virginia Slims Masters St Petersburg. In 1974 the men's tournament was revived as St. Petersburg WCT until 1975 when it was abolished. the women's tournament continued under various brand names and at various locations in the Tampa Bay Area until it was discontinued in 1990.

== History ==
In 1953 Masters Invitational tournament was established at the St Augustine Tennis Club, St Augustine, Florida and played on outdoor clay courts. In 1954 the Masters event was moved to Jacksonville, Florida through till 1959. In 1959 it changed location to St Petersburg, Florida, where it remained under that brand name until 1965. In 1966 the tournaments name was changed to the St Petersburg Masters Invitational until 1970 when the women's event became known as the Virginia Slims Masters of St Petersburg, the men's tournament continued under the same name until 1971 when it was discontinued. The tournament was part Florida–Caribbean Circuit which was a major feature of the international tennis scene in from the 1950s to early 1970s.

The women's event continued under brand name VS Masters of St Petersburg until 1973 when it was rebranded as the St Petersburg Masters Invitational in 1974 a new sponsor was found and the event became known as the Barnett Bank Masters until 1974 when it was discontinued. In 1977 the tournament was revived as the Florida Federal Open until 1985, and in 1986 becoming the Eckerd Open until it was abolished. The tournament was played on outdoor clay courts from 1953 to 1974 and from 1987 to 1990. It was played on outdoor hard courts from 1977 to 1986.

The holding of men's tournaments in the Tampa Bay Area were not as consistent as the women's event in 1974 the former St Petersburg Masters Invitational was revived and rebranded as the St. Petersburg WCT from 1974 to 1975 before that was discontinued. In 1981 a Tampa Open men's tournament held in Tampa, Florida through till 1983.

== Finals ==
=== Men's singles ===
Results included:

Masters Invitational
Year	Champion	Runner-up	Score
1953	(United States) Art Larsen	(United States) Gardnar Mulloy	6–3, 6–2, 6–3
1954	(United States) Art Larsen (2)	(Denmark) Kurt Nielsen	6–2, 6–1, 6–3
1955	(United States) Art Larsen (3)	(United States) Herb Flam	7–5, 6–3, 3–6, 6–3
1956	(United States) Vic Seixas	(United States) Art Larsen	6–4, 6–3, 6–2
1957	(United States) Vic Seixas (2)	(Australia) Mervyn Rose	7–5, 6–1, 7–9, 9–7
1958	(Chile) Luis Ayala	(Australia) Mervyn Rose	6–3, 1–6, 4–6, 6–2, 6–2
1959	(Mexico) Mario Llamas	(Mexico) Francisco Contreras	6–3, 6–4
1960	(Australia) Neale Fraser	(Australia) Roy Emerson	6–4, 6–0, 9–7
1961	(Australia) Roy Emerson	(Chile) Luis Ayala	6–4, 6–2, 6–0
1962	(Australia) Roy Emerson (2)	(Australia) Rod Laver	6–2, 6–4, 6–1
1963	(Spain) Manuel Santana	(Australia) Roy Emerson	6–4, 6–4, 6–8, 3–6, 6–3
1964	(Australia) Roy Emerson (3)	(United States) Frank Froehling	6–3, 6–4, 6–2
1965	(India) Ramanathan Krishnan	(Canada) Mike Belkin	4–6, 6–1, 6–4, 6–3
St Petersburg Masters Invitational
1966	(Socialist Federal Republic of Yugoslavia) Niki Pilić	(United States) Cliff Richey	9–7, 7–5, 8–6
1967	(United States) Allen Fox	(Socialist Federal Republic of Yugoslavia) Niki Pilić	6–3, 3–6, 6–4, 4–6, 6–2
Open era
1968	(Canada) Mike Belkin	(Chile) Jaime Fillol	2–6, 6–0, 7–5, 6–4
1969	(Socialist Federal Republic of Yugoslavia) Željko Franulović	(Chile) Jaime Fillol	6–4, 6–3
1970	(Czechoslovakia) Jan Kodeš	(Mexico) Joaquín Loyo-Mayoo	6–4, 6–2, 6–4
1971	(Canada) Mike Belkin (2)	(West Germany) Harald Elschenbroich	7–5, 7–6, 6–1
For continuation of the men's event see St. Petersburg WCT

=== Women's singles ===
(incomplete roll)

Masters Invitational
Year	Champion	Runner-up	Score
1953	(United States) Doris Hart	(United States) Shirley Fry	6–3, 6–3
1959	(Belgium) Christiane Mercelis	(Australia) Marie Toomey Martin	6–3, 6–4
1960	(United Kingdom) Ann Haydon	(United States) Donna Floyd	6–1, 6–3
1961	(Hungary) Suzy Körmöczy	(United Kingdom) Ann Haydon	6–2, 6–0
1962	(Brazil) Maria Bueno	(United States) Darlene Hard	6–2, 4–6, 6–4
1963	(Brazil) Maria Bueno (2)	(Australia) Lesley Turner	6–2, 11–9
1964	(United States) Nancy Richey	(United States) Judy Alvarez	6–3, 6–4
1965	(United States) Nancy Richey (2)	(Australia) Margaret Smith	6–3, 6–2
St. Petersburg Masters Invitational
1966	(United States) Nancy Richey (3)	(Netherlands) Betty Stöve	6–2, 6–2
1967	(United Kingdom) Ann Haydon-Jones (2)	(Australia) Jan Lehane O'Neill	6–4, 1–6, 6–3
Open era
1968	(United States) Nancy Richey (4)	(Australia) Lesley Turner Bowrey	7–5, 6–0
1969	(Australia) Kerry Melville	(Australia) Lesley Turner Bowrey	6–4, 6–3
1970	(United States) Nancy Richey (5)	(United States) Judy Alvarez	6–0, 6–2
For continuation of the women's event see Virginia Slims Masters St Petersburg

== Locations ==
Played from 1953 to 1990 in various locations in the Tampa Bay Area, Florida in the United States. St Augustine, Florida from 1953 to 1954, then Jacksonville, Florida from 1955 to 1959, then it was held in St. Petersburg, Florida from 1960 to 1975

== Event names ==
- 1953–1965 Masters Invitational
- 1966–1971 St Petersburg Masters Invitational
- 1975–1976 St. Petersburg WCT

== Tournament records ==
- Most men's titles: (United States) Art Larsen & (Australia) Roy Emerson (3)
- Most men's finals: (United States) Art Larsen & (Australia) Roy Emerson (4)
- Most women's titles: (United States) Nancy Richey (5)
- Most women's finals: (United States) Nancy Richey (5)

== See also ==
- Eckerd Open (for continuation of the women's event)
- St. Petersburg WCT (for the revived men's event)
- Tampa Open – men's tournament (1981–1983) held in Tampa, Florida
