= 1974 St. Petersburg WCT =

- Date: February 4–10
- Edition: 1st
- Category: World Championship Tennis (WCT)
- Draw: 32S / 16D
- Prize money: $50,000
- Surface: Carpet / indoor
- Location: St. Petersburg, Florida, US
- Venue: Bayfront Center Arena

Champions

Singles
- (Australia) John Newcombe

Doubles
- (Australia) Owen Davidson / (Australia) John Newcombe
- St. Petersburg WCT

The 1974 St. Petersburg WCT, also known as the Raymond-James World Championship Tennis Classic, was a men's tennis tournament played on indoor carpet courts at the Bayfront Center Arena in St. Petersburg, Florida in the United States. The tournament was part of Blue Group of the 1974 World Championship Tennis circuit. It was the inaugural edition of the event and was held from February 4 through February 10, 1974. First-seeded John Newcombe won the singles title and earned $10,000 first-prize money. The tournament made a loss of $30,000.

== Finals ==
=== Singles ===
(Australia) John Newcombe defeated (Soviet Union) Alex Metreveli 6–0, 7–6^{(7–3)}

- It was Newcombe's 1st singles title of the year and the 32nd of his career in the Open Era.

=== Doubles ===
(Australia) Owen Davidson / (Australia) John Newcombe defeated (United States) Clark Graebner / (United States) Charlie Pasarell 4–6, 6–3, 6–4

- It was Davidson's 1st doubles title of the year and the 9th of his career in the Open Era. It was Newcombe's 1st doubles title of the year and the 27th of his career in the Open Era.

== See also ==
- 1974 Barnett Bank Masters - women's tournament in St. Petersburg
