= 1983 Florida Federal Open – Doubles =

Doubles
- 1983 Florida Federal Open

Final
- Champions: (United States) Martina Navratilova (United States) Pam Shriver
- Runners-up: (United States) Bonnie Gadusek (United States) Wendy White
- Score: 6–0, 6–1

Details
- Draw: 16
- Seeds: 4

Events
Singles	Doubles
- Eckerd Open

Ann Kiyomura and Paula Smith were the defending champions, but none competed this year.

Martina Navratilova and Pam Shriver won the title by defeating Bonnie Gadusek and Wendy White 6–0, 6–1 in the final.

== Seeds ==
1. (United States) Martina Navratilova / (United States) Pam Shriver (champions)
2. (United States) Bonnie Gadusek / (United States) Wendy White (final)
3. (United States) Pam Casale / (United States) Mary-Lou Piatek (first round)
4. (United States) Gigi Fernández / (United States) Beth Herr (first round)

== Draw ==
Key

- Q = Qualifier
- WC = Wild card
- LL = Lucky loser
- Alt = Alternate
- ITF = ITF entry
- PR = Protected ranking
- SR = Special ranking
- SE = Special exempt
- JE = Junior exempt
- JR = Junior Accelerator Programme entrant
- CO = College Accelerator Programme entrant
- NG = Next Gen Accelerator Program entrant
- w/o = Walkover
- r = Retired
- d = Defaulted

=== Draw ===
First round
1	(United States) M Navratilova (United States) P Shriver	6	6
(United States) C Benjamin (United States) F Raschiatore	1	2
(United States) J Klitch (United States) G Purdy	6	4	1
(United States) S Foltz (United States) D Spence	2	6	6
3	(United States) P Casale (United States) ML Piatek	5	3
(United States) Z Garrison (United States) L McNeil	7	6
(United States) L Forood (United States) A Henricksson	3	2
(United States) AM Fernandez (United States) N Yeargin	6	6
(United States) T Phelps (United States) M Torres	2	6	2
(United States) P Louie (Italy) R Reggi	6	4	6
(United States) K Copeland (United States) R White	6	7	7
4	(United States) G Fernández (United States) B Herr	7	6	5
(United States) P Fendick (Canada) M Groat	3	3
(United States) J Newberry (United States) K Sands	6	6
(South Africa) J Mundel (South Africa) R Uys	1	1
2	(United States) B Gadusek (United States) W White	6	6

Quarterfinals
1	(United States) M Navratilova (United States) P Shriver	6	6
(United States) S Foltz (United States) D Spence	0	1
(United States) Z Garrison (United States) L McNeil	6	6
(United States) AM Fernandez (United States) N Yeargin	2	1
(United States) P Louie (Italy) R Reggi	6	6	4
(United States) K Copeland (United States) R White	7	4	6
(United States) J Newberry (United States) K Sands	1	2
2	(United States) B Gadusek (United States) W White	6	6

Semifinals
1	(United States) M Navratilova (United States) P Shriver	6	7
(United States) Z Garrison (United States) L McNeil	1	6
(United States) K Copeland (United States) R White	0	3
2	(United States) B Gadusek (United States) W White	6	6

Final
1	(United States) M Navratilova (United States) P Shriver	6	6
2	(United States) B Gadusek (United States) W White	0	1
