= United States Amateur Championships (tennis) =

United States Amateur Tennis Championships

Defunct tennis tournament
- Event name: United States Amateur Tennis Championships (1968-2011)
- Tour: USTA (1968-2011)
- Founded: 1968
- Abolished: 2011
- Location: Multiple
- Surface: Grass

The United States Amateur Tennis Championships was the top American tennis tournament for amateur players. It was organized by the United States Tennis Association.

The tournament began in 1968 to create an amateur championship in addition to the US Open that was designated a professional event that year for the first time. That first year UCLA student Arthur Ashe won the US Amateur and then went on to win the US Open the same year. He is the only player to win both events in the same year and no one has come close since. In the years that followed, many winners received a wild card entry into the US Open qualifying event.

From 1971 to 1980 the tournament was not held, but then in 1981 was started again. In addition to Ashe, numerous other well-known players have won the event, including former world #1 doubles player Jim Pugh and former world #4 singles player Roscoe Tanner.

In 1995, the tournament changed its name to the Intercollegiate Tennis Association Summer Championships.

== Winners ==
Year	Winner	College	Runner-up	Score
1968	Arthur Ashe	UCLA	Bob Lutz	4–6, 6–3, 8–10, 6–0, 6-4
1969	Stan Smith	USC	Bob Lutz	9–7, 6–3, 6-1
1970	Roscoe Tanner	Stanford	Haroon Rahim	3–6, 2–6, 6–1, 8–6, 10-8
1981	Mark Basham	UCLA	Rick Leach	6–2, 6-3
1982	Tim Pawsat	Southern California	Stevenson Clarke	6–4, 6-1
1983	Allen Miller	Georgia	Eric Rosenfeld	6–4, 6-2
1984	Jim Pugh	UCLA	Mark Styslinger	6–0, 7-6
1985	Bryan Shelton	Georgia Tech	Doug Sachs	6–3, 3–6, 7-6
1986	Buff Farrow	UCLA	John Boytim	4–6, 6–3, 6-3
1987	Brian Page	Clemson	Eric Amend	7-6 (4), 6-4
1988	Marco Cacopardo	Tennessee	Robert Kresburg	7-6 (1), 6-7 (2), 6-4
1989	Joby Foley	West Virginia	Mike Salmon	6–4, 6-3
1990	Joel Finnigan	Arizona State	Warren Fulgenzi	6–4, 6-3
1991	Marco Cacopardo	Tennessee	David Driscoll	6–3, 6-7 (9), 7-5
1992	Chris Pressley	Duke	Andrew Weiss	6–1, 6-2
1993	Tad Berkowitz	New Mexico	Cris Robinson	6–3, 7-6 (5)
1994	Jeff Landau	Wake Forest	Michael Berger	6–4, 6-4
1995	Marty Engel	Northern Illinois	Eric Elek	3–6, 6–4, 6-0
1996	Adam Peterson	Southern California		
1997	Marc Silva	Northwestern	Eddie Jacques	7–5, 7-5
1998	Adam Seri	Georgia	Mark Loughrin	6–2, 6-1
1999	Huntley Montgomery	Virginia	Andre Pedroso	7-6 (3), 6-3
2000	Brian Vahaly	Virginia		
2001	Wade Orr	Tennessee		
2002	Wade Orr	Tennessee		
2003	Chris Martin	Illinois	Ryan Recht	6–1, 6-1
2004	Avery Ticer	Minnesota	Chris Klingemann	1–6, 6–1, 7-6 (2)
2005	Eric Langenkamp	Notre Dame	Eric Hechtman	6–3, 6-1
2006	Jordan Delass	Georgia Tech	Danny Bryan	1–6, 7–5, 10-8
2007	Chris Racz	Tennessee	Mike Sroczynski	7–6, 6-1
2008	Sanam Singh	Virginia	Jason Jung	6–2, 6-1
2009	Sanam Singh	Virginia	Benjamin Biscarrat	6–4, 6-0
2010	Thomas Richter	Unattached	Eliot Potvin	6–3, 6-1
2011	Stephen Hoh	Illinois	Daniel Whitehead	5–7, 6–1, 1-0 (8)
