= 1995 Comcast U.S. Indoor – Singles =

Singles
- 1995 Comcast U.S. Indoor

Final
- Champion: (Sweden) Thomas Enqvist
- Runner-up: (United States) Michael Chang
- Score: 0–6, 6–4, 6–0

Details
- Draw: 32 (3WC/4Q/1LL)
- Seeds: 8

Events
Singles	Doubles
- U.S. Pro Indoor

Michael Chang was the defending champion.

Thomas Enqvist won the title, beating Chang 0–6, 6–4, 6–0 in the final.

== Seeds ==
1. (United States) Pete Sampras (second round)
2. (United States) Andre Agassi (semifinals)
3. (United States) Michael Chang (final)
4. (Netherlands) Jacco Eltingh (first round)
5. (Australia) Patrick Rafter (second round)
6. (Peru) Jaime Yzaga (first round)
7. (Australia) Mark Woodforde (second round)
8. N/A

== Draw ==
Key

- Q = Qualifier
- WC = Wild card
- LL = Lucky loser
- Alt = Alternate
- ITF = ITF entry
- PR = Protected ranking
- SR = Special ranking
- SE = Special exempt
- JE = Junior exempt
- JR = Junior Accelerator Programme entrant
- CO = College Accelerator Programme entrant
- NG = Next Gen Accelerator Program entrant
- w/o = Walkover
- r = Retired
- d = Defaulted

=== Finals ===
Semifinals
(Netherlands) Paul Haarhuis	2	0
3	(United States) Michael Chang	6	6
(Sweden) Thomas Enqvist	7^{7}	5	6
2	(United States) Andre Agassi	6^{5}	7	2

Final
3	(United States) Michael Chang	6	4	0
(Sweden) Thomas Enqvist	0	6	6

=== Top half ===
First round
1	(United States) P Sampras	4	6	7
(Uruguay) M Filippini	6	4	5
(Netherlands) P Haarhuis	3	6	7
(United States) M Washington	6	4	5
(New Zealand) B Steven	5	6	7^{7}
(France) F Santoro	7	1	6^{4}
Q	(United States) M Cacopardo	3	3
7	(Australia) M Woodforde	6	6
3	(United States) M Chang	6	7^{7}
(Australia) R Fromberg	3	6^{5}
(United States) J Grabb	6	6
(Sweden) J Björkman	1	4
WC	(United States) D DiLucia	4	4
(United States) J Stark	6	6
(United States) V Spadea	6	6^{1}	2
5	(Australia) P Rafter	3	7^{7}	6

Second round
1	(United States) P Sampras	4	4
(Netherlands) P Haarhuis	6	6
(New Zealand) B Steven	6	6
7	(Australia) M Woodforde	1	4
3	(United States) M Chang	7^{7}	7
(United States) J Grabb	6^{5}	5
(United States) J Stark	6	4	6
5	(Australia) P Rafter	3	6	2

Quarterfinals
(Netherlands) P Haarhuis	6	6
(New Zealand) B Steven	2	3
3	(United States) M Chang	6^{5}	6	7^{7}
(United States) J Stark	7^{7}	1	6^{4}

Semifinals
(Netherlands) P Haarhuis	2	0
3	(United States) M Chang	6	6

=== Bottom half ===
First round
6	(Peru) J Yzaga	6	6^{6}	5
(Sweden) T Enqvist	2	7^{8}	7
WC	(United States) B Gilbert	0	4
(Brazil) L Mattar	6	6
WC	(United States) L Jensen	6	6
(United States) J Palmer	2	3
(United States) R Reneberg	6	6
4	(Netherlands) J Eltingh	4	3
Q	(Canada) S Lareau	6	6
Q	(United States) S Bryan	4	2
LL	(South Africa) D Nainkin	4	3
(Italy) R Furlan	6	6
(France) A Boetsch	7^{7}	6^{0}	2
(United States) J Tarango	6^{3}	7^{7}	6
Q	(Sweden) J Apell	4	2
2	(United States) A Agassi	6	6

Second round
(Sweden) T Enqvist	6	6
(Brazil) L Mattar	3	1
WC	(United States) L Jensen	5	5
(United States) R Reneberg	7	7
Q	(Canada) S Lareau	w/o
(Italy) R Furlan
(United States) J Tarango	3	4
2	(United States) A Agassi	6	6

Quarterfinals
(Sweden) T Enqvist	6	6
(United States) R Reneberg	4	3
Q	(Canada) S Lareau	5	2
2	(United States) A Agassi	7	6

Semifinals
(Sweden) T Enqvist	7^{7}	5	6
2	(United States) A Agassi	6^{5}	7	2

== Qualifying ==
=== Qualifying seeds ===
1. (Germany) Marc-Kevin Goellner (second round)
2. (Brazil) Fernando Meligeni (first round)
3. (South Africa) Marcos Ondruska (first round)
4. (Sweden) Jan Apell (qualified)
5. (Australia) Todd Woodbridge (second round)
6. (United Kingdom) Mark Petchey (first round)
7. (Germany) Lars Rehmann (first round)
8. (Australia) Michael Tebbutt (second round)

=== Qualifiers ===
1. (Canada) Sébastien Lareau
2. (United States) Marco Cacopardo
3. (United States) Steve Bryan
4. (Sweden) Jan Apell

=== Lucky loser ===
1. (South Africa) David Nainkin

=== Qualifying draw ===
==== First qualifier ====
First round
1	(Germany) Marc-Kevin Goellner	7	6	6
(Spain) Emilio Benfele Álvarez	6	7	4
(Canada) Sébastien Lareau	6	6
WC	(United States) Ivan Baron	3	2
(United States) Steve Campbell	7	1	1
(United States) Michael Joyce	5	6	6
(Australia) Grant Doyle	6	6	6
7	(Germany) Lars Rehmann	7	3	4

Second round
1	(Germany) Marc-Kevin Goellner	3	4
(Canada) Sébastien Lareau	6	6
(United States) Michael Joyce	4	4
(Australia) Grant Doyle	6	6

Qualifying competition
(Canada) Sébastien Lareau	7	6
(Australia) Grant Doyle	5	4

==== Second qualifier ====
First round
2	(Brazil) Fernando Meligeni	3	3
(Australia) Sandon Stolle	6	6
(South Africa) David Nainkin	7	6
(United States) Brian Dunn	6	3
(Italy) Diego Nargiso	4	6	6
WC	(United States) Marco Cacopardo	6	3	7
WC	(United States) Chris Woodruff	3	6	2
8	(Australia) Michael Tebbutt	6	1	6

Second round
(Australia) Sandon Stolle	4	5
(South Africa) David Nainkin	6	7
WC	(United States) Marco Cacopardo	6	7
8	(Australia) Michael Tebbutt	4	5

Qualifying competition
(South Africa) David Nainkin	2	4
WC	(United States) Marco Cacopardo	6	6

==== Third qualifier ====
First round
3	(South Africa) Marcos Ondruska	3	3
(United States) Steve Bryan	6	6
(Zimbabwe) Kevin Ullyett	6	6
(United States) Alex O'Brien	4	4
WC	(Australia) Mark Philippoussis	7	5	6
(South Africa) Christo van Rensburg	6	7	2
(United States) Louis Gloria	7	6
6	(United Kingdom) Mark Petchey	5	4

Second round
(United States) Steve Bryan	7	6
(Zimbabwe) Kevin Ullyett	6	4
WC	(Australia) Mark Philippoussis	6	2	7
(United States) Louis Gloria	3	6	5

Qualifying competition
(United States) Steve Bryan	7	7
WC	(Australia) Mark Philippoussis	6	6

==== Fourth qualifier ====
First round
4	(Sweden) Jan Apell	6	6
(Mexico) Óscar Ortiz	2	2
(Australia) Wally Masur	4	6	6
(United States) Doug Flach	6	2	1
(South Africa) Ellis Ferreira	6	6
(South Africa) Mark Kaplan	1	3
(United States) Robbie Weiss	3	4
5	(Australia) Todd Woodbridge	6	6

Second round
4	(Sweden) Jan Apell	6	1	7
(Australia) Wally Masur	3	6	6
(South Africa) Ellis Ferreira	6	6
5	(Australia) Todd Woodbridge	4	4

Qualifying competition
4	(Sweden) Jan Apell	6	6
(South Africa) Ellis Ferreira	1	3
