= 1995 Comcast U.S. Indoor – Doubles =

Doubles
- 1995 Comcast U.S. Indoor

Final
- Champions: (United States) Jim Grabb (United States) Jonathan Stark
- Runners-up: (Netherlands) Jacco Eltingh (Netherlands) Paul Haarhuis
- Score: 7–6, 6–7, 6–3

Details
- Draw: 16 (3WC/1Q)
- Seeds: 4

Events
Singles	Doubles
← 1994 ·	U.S. Pro Indoor	· 1996 →

Jacco Eltingh and Paul Haarhuis were the defending champions, but lost in the final this year.

Jim Grabb and Jonathan Stark won the title, defeating Eltingh and Haarhuis 7–6, 6–7, 6–3 in the final.

== Seeds ==
1. (Netherlands) Jacco Eltingh / (Netherlands) Paul Haarhuis (final)
2. (Australia) Todd Woodbridge / (Australia) Mark Woodforde (semifinals)
3. (Sweden) Jan Apell / (Sweden) Jonas Björkman (first round)
4. (United States) Jared Palmer / (United States) Richey Reneberg (first round)

== Draw ==
=== Key ===
- Q = Qualifier
- WC = Wild card
- LL = Lucky loser
- Alt = Alternate
- SE = Special exempt
- PR = Protected ranking
- ITF = ITF entry
- JE = Junior exempt
- w/o = Walkover
- r = Retired
- d = Defaulted
- SR = Special ranking

=== Draw ===
First round
1	(Netherlands) J Eltingh (Netherlands) P Haarhuis	6	6
WC	(United States) L Jensen (United States) M Jensen	4	2
Q	(United Kingdom) N Broad (United States) G Van Emburgh	6	3
WC	(United States) M Joyce (United States) V Spadea	7	6
3	(Sweden) J Apell (Sweden) J Björkman	4	3
(The Bahamas) M Knowles (Canada) D Nestor	6	6
(United States) T Kronemann (Australia) D Macpherson	6	6	6
(United States) R Leach (United States) S Melville	7	4	7
(United States) A O'Brien (Australia) S Stolle	6	3
(United States) M Bauer (Italy) D Nargiso	7	6
(United States) J Grabb (United States) J Stark	6	6
4	(United States) J Palmer (United States) R Reneberg	2	4
(Canada) S Lareau (New Zealand) B Steven	4	6
WC	(South Africa) C van Rensburg (South Africa) D Visser	6	7
(Australia) J Fitzgerald (Australia) P Rafter	3	2
2	(Australia) T Woodbridge (Australia) M Woodforde	6	6

Quarterfinals
1	(Netherlands) J Eltingh (Netherlands) P Haarhuis	7	6
WC	(United States) M Joyce (United States) V Spadea	6	3
(The Bahamas) M Knowles (Canada) D Nestor	6	6	6
(United States) R Leach (United States) S Melville	7	3	4
(United States) M Bauer (Italy) D Nargiso	4	4
(United States) J Grabb (United States) J Stark	6	6
WC	(South Africa) C van Rensburg (South Africa) D Visser	4	6	3
2	(Australia) T Woodbridge (Australia) M Woodforde	6	3	6

Semifinals
1	(Netherlands) J Eltingh (Netherlands) P Haarhuis	7	6
(The Bahamas) M Knowles (Canada) D Nestor	6	4
(United States) J Grabb (United States) J Stark	6	1	6
2	(Australia) T Woodbridge (Australia) M Woodforde	4	6	3

Final
1	(Netherlands) J Eltingh (Netherlands) P Haarhuis	6	7	3
(United States) J Grabb (United States) J Stark	7	6	6

== Qualifying ==
=== Qualifiers ===
1. (United Kingdom) Neil Broad / (United States) Greg Van Emburgh

=== Qualifying seeds ===
1. (Australia) Andrew Florent / (Zimbabwe) Kevin Ullyett (qualifying competition)
2. (United Kingdom) Neil Broad / (United States) Greg Van Emburgh (qualified)

=== Qualifying draw ===
First round				Qualifying competition
1	(Australia) Andrew Florent (Zimbabwe) Kevin Ullyett	7	6
WC	(United States) David DiLucia (United States) Jeff Tarango	6	4	1	(Australia) Andrew Florent (Zimbabwe) Kevin Ullyett	3	6
	(South Africa) Brent Haygarth (South Africa) Byron Talbot	5	5	2	(United Kingdom) Neil Broad (United States) Greg Van Emburgh	6	7
2	(United Kingdom) Neil Broad (United States) Greg Van Emburgh	7	7
