= Jeff Landau =

American tennis player

- Born: January 9, 1974 (age 52)
- Education: Wake Forest University
- Tennis career
- Residence: Jakarta, Indonesia
- Plays: Right-handed

Singles
- Highest ranking: No. 1325

Jeff Landau (born January 9, 1974) is an American former professional tennis player who won the 1994 National Amateur tennis championships. In 2026, he was inducted into the New England Tennis Hall of Fame.

== Biography ==
Landau was a native of Ridgefield, Connecticut. He was state high school champion for Connecticut on two separate times.

In 1994, Landau won the National Amateur tennis championships as a junior at Wake Forest University.

In June 2026, he was inducted into the New England Tennis Hall of Fame in Newport, Rhode Island.
