= 1986 Eckerd Open =

- Date: September 15–21
- Edition: 14th
- Draw: 32S / 16D
- Prize money: $125,000
- Surface: Hard / outdoor
- Location: Largo, Florida, U.S.
- Venue: Bardmoor Country Club

Champions

Singles
- (United States) Lori McNeil

Doubles
- (United States) Elise Burgin / (South Africa) Rosalyn Fairbank
← 1985 ·	Eckerd Open	· 1987 →

The 1986 Eckerd Open was a women's tennis tournament played on outdoor hard courts at the Bardmoor Country Club in Largo, Florida in the United States and was part of the 1986 Virginia Slims World Championship Series. It was the 14th edition of the tournament and was held from September 15 through September 21, 1986. Unseeded Lori McNeil won the singles title and earned $25,000 first-prize money.

== Finals ==
=== Singles ===
(United States) Lori McNeil defeated (United States) Zina Garrison 2–6, 7–5, 6–2

- It was McNeil's 1st singles title of her career.

=== Doubles ===
(United States) Elise Burgin / (South Africa) Rosalyn Fairbank defeated (United States) Gigi Fernández / (United States) Kim Sands 7–5, 6–2
