= Roscoe Tanner =

American tennis player (born 1951)

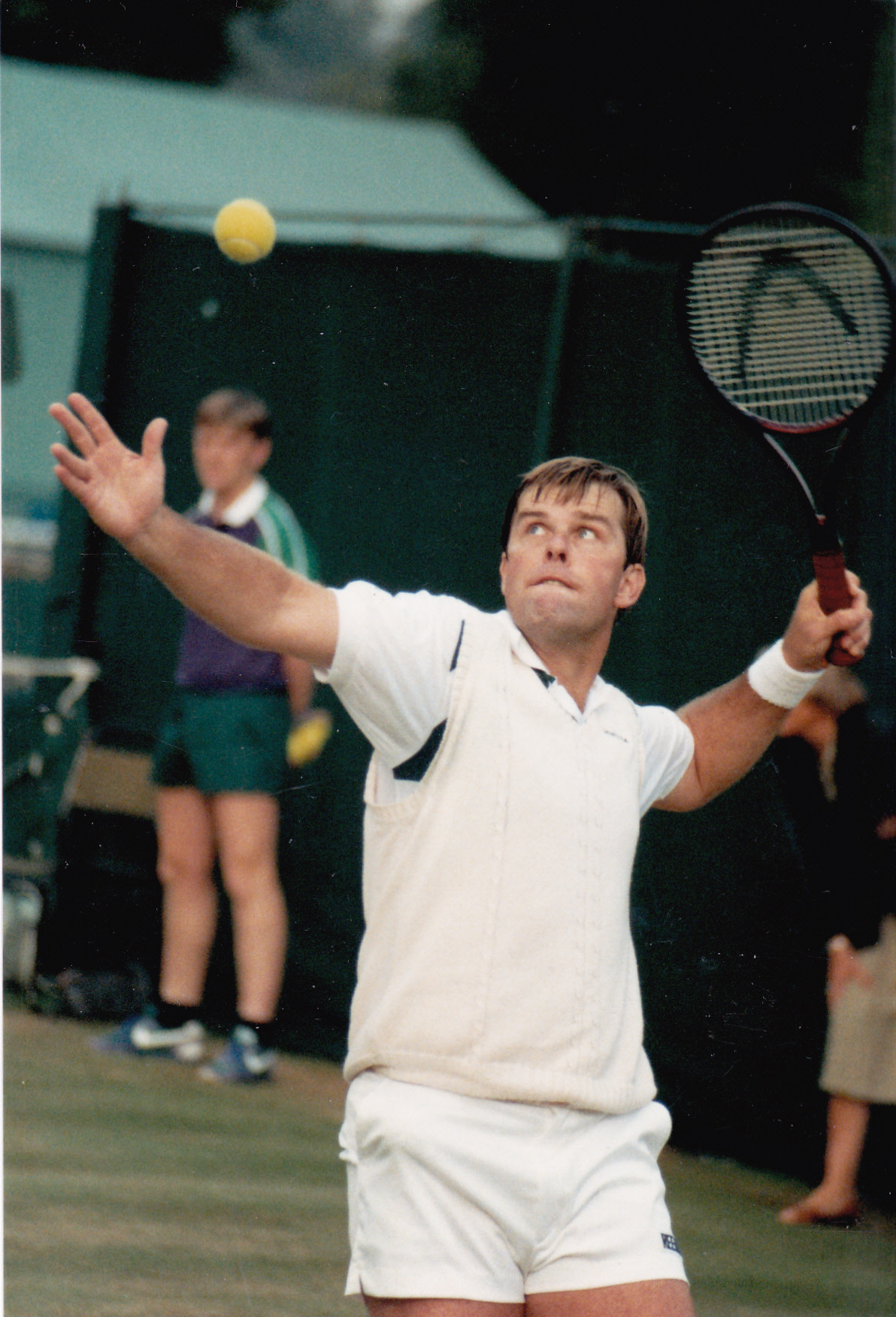
- Country (sports): United States
- Residence: Kiawah Island, South Carolina, US
- Born: October 15, 1951 (age 75) Chattanooga, Tennessee, US
- Height: 6 ft 0 in (1.83 m)
- Turned pro: 1972 (amateur from 1969)
- Retired: 1985
- Plays: Left-handed (one-handed backhand)
- Prize money: $1,696,198

Singles
- Career record: 592–293 (66.9%)
- Career titles: 16
- Highest ranking: No. 4 (July 30, 1979)

Grand Slam singles results
- Australian Open: W (1977^{Jan})
- French Open: 4R (1978)
- Wimbledon: F (1979)
- US Open: SF (1974, 1979)

Other tournaments
- Tour Finals: RR (1976, 1977, 1979, 1981)
- WCT Finals: SF (1981)

Doubles
- Career record: 272-182 (59.9%)
- Career titles: 13
- Highest ranking: No. 14 (August 23, 1977)

Leonard Roscoe Tanner (born October 15, 1951) is an American former professional tennis player. He reached a career-high singles ranking of world No. 4 on July 30, 1979. Tanner won 16 titles throughout his career.

Tanner was famous for his big left-handed serve, which was regarded as the fastest on the tour during his era. It was reportedly clocked at a then world record of 153 miles per hour (246 km/h) at the Mission Hills Country Club in Rancho Mirage, California on February 19, 1978 during the 1978 American Airlines Tennis Games singles final against Raúl Ramírez.

He is also known for winning the men's singles title at the first of two Australian Open tournaments held in 1977. Tanner won the tournament held in January. Tanner reached the Wimbledon final in 1979, narrowly losing to Björn Borg in five sets.

After his retirement, Tanner received media attention in the 2000s for legal problems that included stretches of imprisonment, arrests for missing child support payments, allegations of financial misdeeds, and bankruptcy.

== Early life ==
Leonard Roscoe Tanner III was born in Chattanooga, Tennessee on 15 October 1951. He is the son of Leonard Roscoe Tanner Jr., an attorney who played collegiate tennis at the University of Chattanooga, and Anne Tanner. Tanner grew up in Lookout Mountain, Tennessee where he was introduced to tennis at the age of 6. He competed against Jimmy Connors throughout juniors and Tanner said in an interview that he won most of their matches. He won his first Junior U.S. Nationals Tournament at 16-years-old.

Tanner graduated from Baylor School with honors, where he was captain of the tennis team and recipient of the Senior Tennis Award. He went on to help lead Stanford University's rise to national prominence in collegiate tennis with teammate, Sandy Mayer.Tanner played number one singles, with Mayer playing number two. In 1972, Tanner and Mayer won the NCAA doubles championship, and the Stanford team finished second in the NCAA tournament, behind Trinity (TX). The team also featured Chico Hagey, Rick Fisher, Jim Delaney, Gery Groslimond, Chip Fisher, Paul Sidone, and Tim Noonan.

== Career ==
Early career (1969–73)

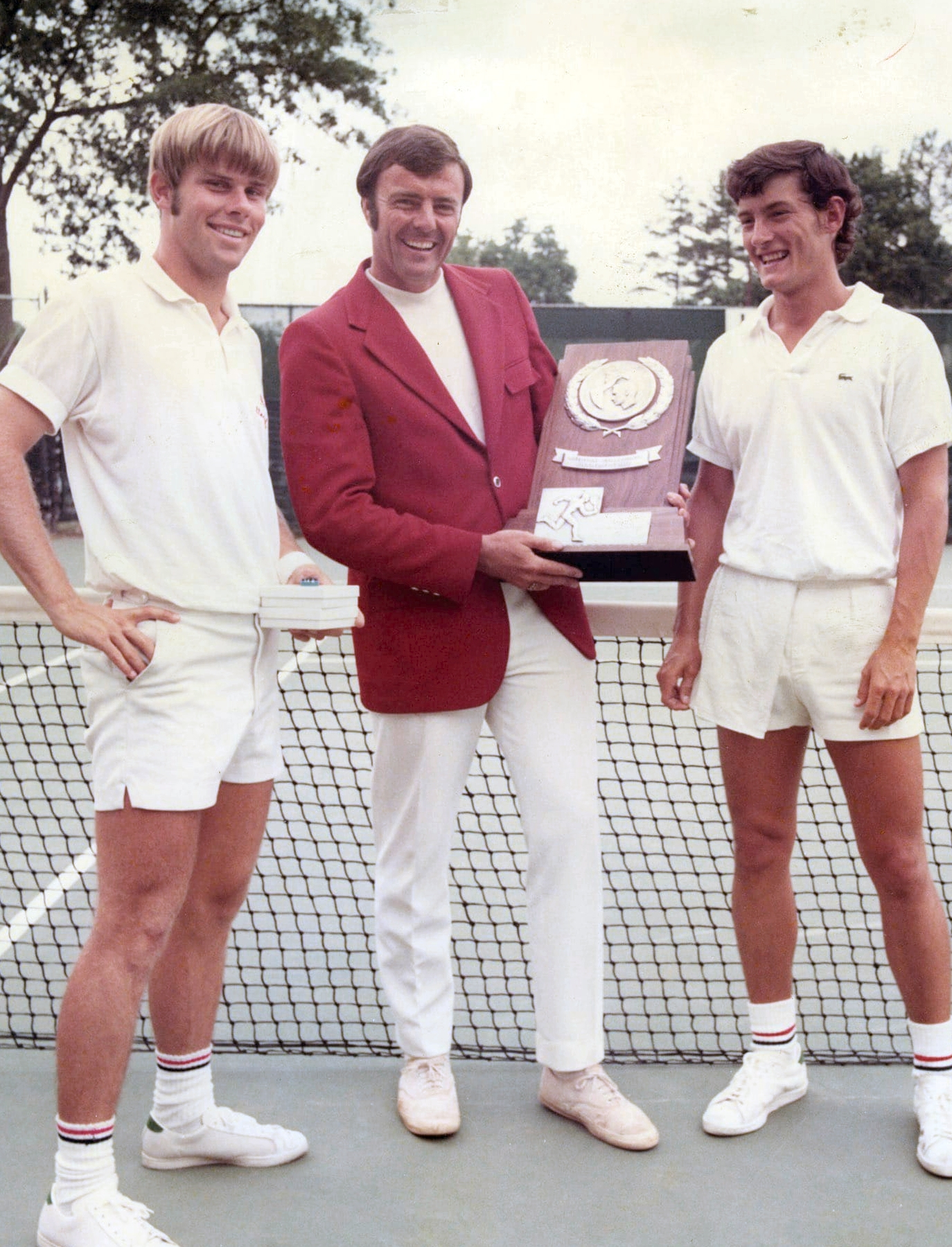
Stanford tennis coach Gould holds the 1972 NCAA Championship trophy won by Roscoe Tanner and Sandy Mayer playing men's doubles.

Tanner defeated Haroon Rahim 10–8 in the fifth set to win the 1970 United States Amateur Championships. While attending Stanford, Tanner began playing professional tennis tournaments throughout the U.S., which earned him a ranking in the top 20. Tanner graduated from Stanford, forgoed law school, and officially turned pro in 1972. That same year, the world no.1, Arthur Ashe, asked Tanner to be his doubles partner and Tanner says, "One of the biggest turning points for me was playing doubles with Arthur Ashe," in a 2020 interview. His first tournament on tour was the 1972 Wimbledon Championships, where he lost to Colin Dibley in the 3rd round. Tanner made it to the quarterfinals of the 1972 U.S. Open, where he lost to Tom Gorman in 5 sets. Tanner won his first professional tournament in doubles with Arthur Ashe in 1973 Denver WCT.

Peak years (1974–79)

Tanner claimed the singles and doubles titles at Denver WCT in 1974 where he defeated Arthur Ashe. Tanner lost in a 1975 Wimbledon semifinal to Jimmy Connors and lost in a 1976 Wimbledon semifinal to Björn Borg. In the round of 16 in the 1976 U.S. Open, Tanner lost to Ilie Nastase – where Tanner told the umpire to change the call on Nastase's ball from "out" to "in". Tanner defeated Guillermo Vilas in three straight sets in the 1977 Australian Open (January) final, to win his first and only Grand Slam title.

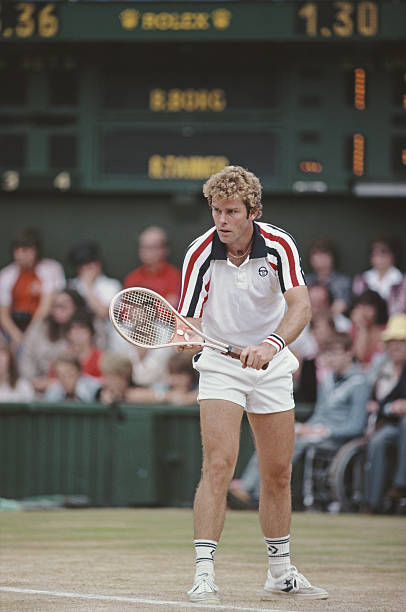
Tanner prepares to serve at the 1979 Wimbledon final.

Tanner went on to clock a 153 mph serve at the 1978 Palm Springs Tournament where he defeated Raul Ramirez. His booming 153 mph serve was the fastest ever recorded in tournament competition from February 1978 until Andy Roddick posted a 155 mph serve in a Davis Cup semifinal in September 2004 against Vladimir Voltchkov. Research has shown that the advancements made to modern day tennis rackets have allowed serve speed to increase by 17.5%.

Tanner lost a five set match to Björn Borg in the 1979 Wimbledon final, which was the first Wimbledon final to be broadcast live in the United States as part of NBC's Breakfast at Wimbledon. Tanner avenged this loss to Borg by beating him in four sets in the US Open quarterfinals two months later, a match where Tanner's 140 mph serve brought the net down during the fourth set. Tanner lost to Vitas Gerulaitis in a five-set thriller in the semifinals. Tanner described his 1979 US Open win over Borg and loss to Gerulaitis in his autobiography as "the highest of my highs and the lowest of my lows on a tennis court within two days of each other".

1980s

Tanner advanced to the quarter-finals of the U.S Open in 1980 and 1981. He made it to the quarter-finals at Wimbledon in 1980 and 1983, despite suffering an injury to his left elbow, his serving arm. He won the Davis Cup in 1981 playing with John McEnroe, Eliot Teltscher and Peter Fleming on a team captained by Arthur Ashe that defeated Argentina in the final, played at Riverfront Coliseum in Cincinnati.

1985: Retirement

Tanner officially retired from professional tennis in 1985. He coached in Europe for a brief period and led clinics at tennis resorts in the United States. He played in the Over-50s tennis tournaments and was ranked 2nd in the world during that period.

== Playing style ==
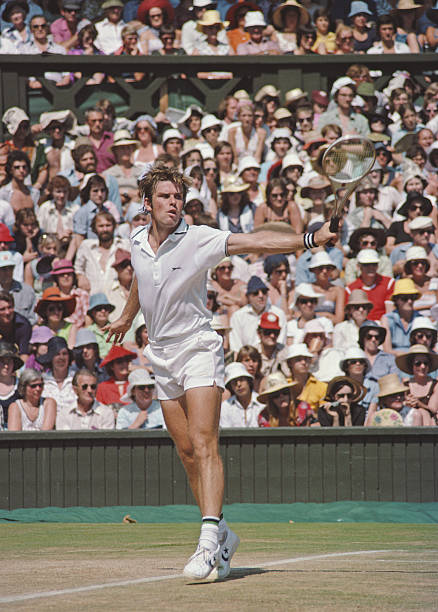
In January 1977, Tanner won the Australian Open.

Tanner was known for his unorthodox, very strong left-handed serve that was tossed very low and struck with a lunge involving the whole body, earning him the nickname "The Rocket". In a 2023 podcast interview, Tanner explained how he first learned his service motion: "When [Jerry Evert] taught me how to serve... he took me to the woods beside the court without a ball, and had me do the service motion knocking leaves off of trees." His game consisted of a powerful serve with an approach to the net and strong volleys.

In a video for Jack Kramer, Tanner said, "The offensive style of game which is closest to my heart is basically the attacking style... that is a serve and volley type of game. That's really moving at the other player, picking out their weaknesses and attacking them, being aggressive." Tanner played with a PDP Open racket, which was the "stiffest" racket on tour at the time, which added speed and power to his strokes and volleys.

== Grand Slam singles performance timeline ==
Key
W	F	SF	QF	#R	RR	Q#	DNQ	A	NH

(W) winner; (F) finalist; (SF) semifinalist; (QF) quarterfinalist; (#R) rounds 4, 3, 2, 1; (RR) round-robin stage; (Q#) qualification round; (DNQ) did not qualify; (A) absent; (NH) not held; (SR) strike rate (events won / competed); (W–L) win–loss record.

Tournament	1969	1970	1971	1972	1973	1974	1975	1976	1977		1978	1979	1980	1981	1982	1983	1984	SR	W–L
Australian Open^{1}	A	A	A	A	A	A	A	A	W	1R	A	A	A	2R	A	3R	A	1 / 4	9–3
French Open	A	A	A	A	A	1R	3R	A	A		4R	A	A	A	A	A	A	0 / 3	5–3
Wimbledon	A	A	A	3R	A	4R	SF	SF	1R		4R	F	QF	2R	4R	QF	A	0 / 11	36–11
US Open	1R	2R	3R	QF	3R	SF	3R	4R	4R		4R	SF	QF	QF	2R	3R	1R	0 / 16	40–16
Win–loss	0–1	0–1	2–1	6–2	2–1	8–3	9–3	8–2	9–3		9–3	11–2	8–2	6–3	4–2	8–3	0–1	1 / 34	90–33

^{1}The Australian Open was played twice in 1977, in January and December.

=== Grand Slam finals ===
==== Singles: 2 (1 titles, 1 runner-up) ====
Result	Year	Championship	Surface	Opponent	Score
Win	1977	Australian Open (Jan.)	Grass	(Argentina) Guillermo Vilas	6–3, 6–3, 6–3
Loss	1979	Wimbledon	Grass	(Sweden) Björn Borg	7–6^{(7–4)}, 1–6, 6–3, 3–6, 4–6

== Career finals ==
=== Singles: 41 (15 titles / 26 runner-ups) ===
Result	No.	Year	Tournament	Surface	Opponent	Score
Loss	1.	1972	Albany, U.S.	Hard (i)	(United States) Jimmy Connors	2–6, 6–7
Loss	2.	1972	Los Angeles, U.S.	Hard	(United States) Stan Smith	4–6, 4–6
Loss	3.	1973	Milan WCT, Italy	Carpet (i)	(United States) Marty Riessen	6–7, 0–6, 6–7
Loss	4.	1974	Palm Desert WCT, U.S.	Hard	(Australia) Rod Laver	4–6, 2–6
Win	1.	1974	Denver WCT, U.S.	Carpet (i)	(United States) Arthur Ashe	6–2, 6–4
Loss	5.	1974	Columbus, U.S.	Hard	(Mexico) Raúl Ramírez	6–3, 6–7, 4–6
Loss	6.	1974	Maui, U.S.	Hard	(Australia) John Newcombe	6–7, 6–7
Win	2.	1974	Christchurch, New Zealand	Carpet (i)	(Australia) Ray Ruffels	6–4, 6–2
Loss	7.	1975	St. Petersburg WCT, U.S.	Hard	(Mexico) Raúl Ramírez	0–6, 6–1, 2–6
Loss	8.	1975	St. Louis WCT, U.S.	Clay	(United States) Vitas Gerulaitis	6–2, 2–6, 3–6
Loss	9.	1975	Charlotte, U.S.	Clay	(Mexico) Raúl Ramírez	6–3, 4–6, 3–6
Win	3.	1975	Las Vegas WCT, U.S.	Hard	(Australia) Ross Case	5–7, 7–5, 7–6
Win	4.	1975	Chicago, U.S.	Carpet (i)	(Australia) John Alexander	6–1, 6–7, 7–6
Loss	10.	1975	Los Angeles, U.S.	Hard	(United States) Arthur Ashe	6–3, 5–7, 3–6
Loss	11.	1976	Birmingham, U.S.	Carpet (i)	(United States) Jimmy Connors	4–6, 6–3, 1–6
Loss	12.	1976	Rancho Mirage, U.S.	Hard	(United States) Jimmy Connors	4–6, 4–6
Win	5.	1976	Cincinnati, U.S.	Clay	(United States) Eddie Dibbs	7–6, 6–3
Win	6.	1976	Columbus, U.S.	Hard	(United States) Stan Smith	6–4, 7–6
Loss	13.	1976	South Orange, U.S.	Clay	(Romania) Ilie Năstase	4–6, 2–6
Win	7.	1976	San Francisco, U.S.	Hard (i)	(United States) Brian Gottfried	4–6, 7–5, 6–1
Win	8.	1976	Tokyo Outdoor, Japan	Clay	(Italy) Corrado Barazzutti	6–3, 6–2
Loss	14.	1976	Wembley, U.K.	Carpet (i)	(United States) Jimmy Connors	6–3, 6–7, 4–6
Win	9.	1977^{J}	Australian Open, Melbourne	Grass	(Argentina) Guillermo Vilas	6–3, 6–3, 6–3
Loss	15.	1977	South Orange, U.S.	Clay	(Argentina) Guillermo Vilas	4–6, 1–6
Loss	16.	1977	Hilton Head, U.S.	Clay	(Sweden) Björn Borg	4–6, 5–7
Loss	17.	1977	WCT Challenge Cup, Las Vegas	Carpet (i)	(United States) Jimmy Connors	2–6, 6–5, 6–3, 2–6, 5–6
Win	10.	1977	Sydney Outdoor, Australia	Grass	(United States) Brian Teacher	6–3, 3–6, 6–3, 6–7, 6–4
Loss	18.	1978	Philadelphia, U.S.	Carpet (i)	(United States) Jimmy Connors	2–6, 4–6, 3–6
Win	11.	1978	Rancho Mirage, U.S.	Hard	(Mexico) Raúl Ramírez	6–1, 7–6
Win	12.	1978	New Orleans, U.S.	Carpet (i)	(United States) Victor Amaya	6–3, 7–5
Win	13.	1979	Rancho Mirage, U.S.	Hard	(United States) Brian Gottfried	6–4, 6–2
Win	14.	1979	Washington Indoor, U.S.	Carpet (i)	(United States) Brian Gottfried	6–4, 6–4
Loss	19.	1979	New Orleans, U.S.	Carpet (i)	(United States) John McEnroe	4–6, 2–6
Loss	20.	1979	Wimbledon, U.K.	Grass	(Sweden) Björn Borg	7–6, 1–6, 6–3, 3–6, 4–6
Loss	21.	1979	Cincinnati, U.S.	Hard	(United States) Peter Fleming	4–6, 2–6
Loss	22.	1980	Richmond WCT, U.S.	Carpet (i)	(United States) John McEnroe	1–6, 2–6
Win	15.	1981	Philadelphia, U.S.	Carpet (i)	(Poland) Wojtek Fibak	6–2, 7–6, 7–5
Loss	23.	1981	Memphis, U.S.	Carpet (i)	(United States) Gene Mayer	2–6, 4–6
Loss	24.	1981	Bristol, U.K.	Grass	(Australia) Mark Edmondson	3–6, 7–5, 4–6
Loss	25.	1981	Sydney Indoor, Australia	Hard (i)	(United States) John McEnroe	4–6, 5–7, 2–6
Loss	26.	1982	La Costa WCT, U.S.	Hard	(South Africa) Johan Kriek	0–6, 6–4, 0–6, 4–6

=== Doubles: 29 (13 titles / 16 runner-ups) ===
Result	No.	Year	Tournament	Surface	Partner	Opponents	Score
Loss	1.	1971	Cincinnati, U.S.	Clay	(United States) Sandy Mayer	(United States) Stan Smith (United States) Erik van Dillen	4–6, 4–6
Loss	2.	1971	Columbus, U.S.	Hard	(United States) Jimmy Connors	(United States) Jim McManus (United States) Jim Osborne	6–4, 5–7, 2–6
Loss	3.	1973	London WCT, U.K.	Hard (i)	(United States) Arthur Ashe	(Netherlands) Tom Okker (United States) Marty Riessen	3–6, 3–6
Loss	4.	1973	Washington WCT, U.S.	Carpet (i)	(United States) Arthur Ashe	(Netherlands) Tom Okker (United States) Marty Riessen	6–4, 6–7, 2–6
Loss	5.	1973	Houston WCT, U.S.	Clay	(United States) Arthur Ashe	(Netherlands) Tom Okker (United States) Marty Riessen	5–7, 5–7
Win	1.	1973	Denver WCT, U.S.	Carpet (i)	(United States) Arthur Ashe	(Netherlands) Tom Okker (United States) Marty Riessen	3–6, 6–3, 7–6
Loss	6.	1973	Paris Indoor, France	Hard (i)	(United States) Arthur Ashe	(Spain) Juan Gisbert Sr. (Romania) Ilie Năstase	2–6, 6–4, 5–7
Loss	7.	1974	Bologna Indoor, Italy	Carpet (i)	(United States) Arthur Ashe	(Sweden) Ove Bengtson (Sweden) Björn Borg	4–6, 7–5, 6–4, 6–7, 2–6
Win	2.	1974	Barcelona WCT, Spain	Carpet (i)	(United States) Arthur Ashe	(United States) Tom Edlefsen (United States) Tom Leonard	6–3, 6–4
Loss	8.	1974	Houston, U.S.	Clay	(United States) Arthur Ashe	(Australia) Colin Dibley (Australia) Rod Laver	6–4, 6–7, 4–6
Win	3.	1974	Denver WCT, U.S.	Carpet (i)	(United States) Arthur Ashe	(United Kingdom) Mark Cox (Japan) Jun Kamiwazumi	6–3, 7–6
Win	4.	1974	Maui, U.S.	Hard	(United States) Dick Stockton	(Australia) Owen Davidson (Australia) John Newcombe	6–3, 7–6
Win	5.	1974	Christchurch, New Zealand	Carpet (i)	(Egypt) Ismail El Shafei	(Australia) Syd Ball (Australia) Ray Ruffels	w/o
Win	6.	1974	Jakarta, Indonesia	Hard	(Egypt) Ismail El Shafei	(West Germany) Jürgen Fassbender (West Germany) Hans-Jürgen Pohmann	7–5, 6–3
Loss	9.	1975	St. Petersburg WCT, U.S.	Hard	(United States) Charlie Pasarell	(United States) Brian Gottfried (Mexico) Raúl Ramírez	4–6, 4–6
Loss	10.	1975	La Costa WCT, U.S.	Hard	(United States) Charlie Pasarell	(United States) Brian Gottfried (Mexico) Raúl Ramírez	5–7, 4–6
Win	7.	1975	Nottingham, U.K.	Grass	(United States) Charlie Pasarell	(Netherlands) Tom Okker (United States) Marty Riessen	6–2, 6–3
Loss	11.	1975	Stockholm, Sweden	Hard (i)	(United States) Charlie Pasarell	(South Africa) Bob Hewitt (South Africa) Frew McMillan	6–3, 3–6, 4–6
Loss	12.	1976	Memphis WCT, U.S.	Carpet (i)	(United States) Marty Riessen	(India) Anand Amritraj (India) Vijay Amritraj	3–6, 4–6
Win	8.	1976	La Costa WCT, U.S.	Hard	(United States) Marty Riessen	(United States) Peter Fleming (United States) Gene Mayer	7–6, 7–6
Win	9.	1976	Johannesburg WCT, South Africa	Hard	(United States) Marty Riessen	(South Africa) Frew McMillan (Netherlands) Tom Okker	6–2, 7–5
Win	10.	1976	San Francisco, U.S.	Hard (i)	(United States) Dick Stockton	(United States) Brian Gottfried (South Africa) Bob Hewitt	6–3, 6–4
Loss	13.	1976	Maui, U.S.	Hard	(United States) Dick Stockton	(South Africa) Raymond Moore (Australia) Allan Stone	7–6, 3–6, 4–6
Win	11.	1976	Perth, Australia	Hard (i)	(United States) Dick Stockton	(Australia) Bob Carmichael (Egypt) Ismail El Shafei	6–7, 6–1, 6–2
Win	12.	1976	Wembley, U.K.	Carpet (i)	(United States) Stan Smith	(Poland) Wojtek Fibak (United States) Brian Gottfried	7–6, 6–3
Loss	14.	1977	Palm Springs, U.S.	Hard	(United States) Marty Riessen	(South Africa) Bob Hewitt (South Africa) Frew McMillan	6–7, 6–7
Loss	15.	1977	Cincinnati, U.S.	Hard	(South Africa) Bob Hewitt	(Australia) John Alexander (Australia) Phil Dent	3–6, 6–7
Loss	16.	1977	Hong Kong	Hard	(United States) Marty Riessen	(Australia) Syd Ball (Australia) Kim Warwick	6–7, 3–6
Win	13.	1978	Palm Springs, U.S.	Hard	(South Africa) Raymond Moore	(South Africa) Bob Hewitt (South Africa) Frew McMillan	6–4, 6–4

== Personal life ==
Tanner has been married three times, first to Nancy, then Charlotte, and last to Margaret. He has five children, Omega Anne Romano, Tamara Tanner, Lauren Tanner, Anne Monique, and Lacey Tanner. He went through a costly divorce with his first wife, Nancy, that led to financial troubles.

=== Legal issues ===
Tanner's conflicts with the law stem from financial mismanagement. He was first arrested in 1997 for failure to pay child support. He was arrested again in June 2003 on a fugitive warrant on charges related to passing a bad check. He pleaded guilty and received an initial sentence of probation. Tanner violated his probation and served one year in prison in Florida, but was then jailed for contempt of court in California.

In 2008, Tanner was again arrested for writing a bad check in Knoxville, Tennessee, but it was settled out of court. After being evicted from his home, Tanner was arrested in January 2012 for writing another bad check. In March 2013, Tanner was arrested in Florida for writing a bad check and grand theft, and in 2014, he served 10 days for driving with a suspended license. In 2015, Tanner was arrested for failure to appear in court on a previous warrant.

=== Tennis clinics ===
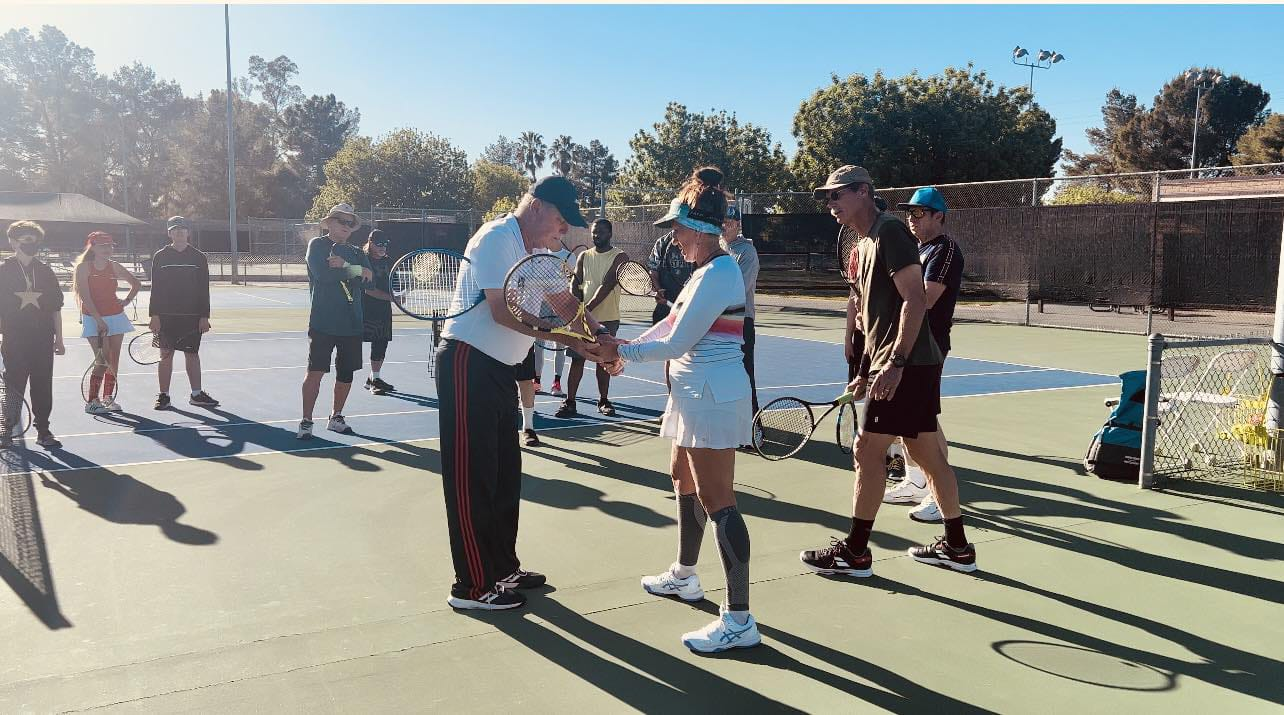
Roscoe offers a tennis clinic in Tucson, AZ

Tanner has a venture in teaching tennis. He has taught at doubles tennis camps with other professionals, and is the camp director at his own training camp. Tanner is passionate about helping underprivileged children gain access to the sport. The Roscoe Tanner Tennis Clinic has become a mainstay event in Tucson, Arizona and Houston, Texas. The clinic encompasses the mechanics of serving including stance, location, stroke, contact point, toss, and follow-through, creating weight transfer. Roscoe covers placement, types of serve (flat, slice, kick), and when to use it. He also has a section on volleys and net play.

=== Books ===
- Double Fault: My Rise And Fall, And My Road Back (2005) by Roscoe Tanner and Mike Yorkey, Foreword by Stan Smith.
- Second Serve: My Fall From Grace and Road to Reconciliation, is dedicated to his daughters Lauren, Tamara, Anne Monique and Lacey Tanner.

== Recognition ==
Roscoe Tanner is known for holding the record for the fastest serve in the world (153 mph) from 1978–2005. His offensive playing style led him to a career high of No. 4 in the world in 1979. He is the Grand Slam singles champion of the 1977 Australian Open. Tanner received the "Fair Play Award" from the United Nations in 1979.
