= 1978 Florida Federal Open =

- Date: November 6–12
- Edition: 6th
- Category: Colgate Series (AA)
- Draw: 32S / 16D
- Prize money: $75,000
- Surface: Hard / outdoor
- Location: Oldsmar, United States
- Venue: East Lake Woodlands Country Club

Champions

Singles
- (United Kingdom) Virginia Wade

Doubles
- (United States) Martina Navratilova / (United States) Anne Smith
← 1977 ·	Eckerd Open	· 1979 →

The 1978 Florida Federal Open was a women's singles tennis tournament played on outdoor hard courts at East Lake Woodlands Country Club in Oldsmar, Florida in the United States. The event was part of the AA (Note: Tournaments with prize money for the women of at least $75,000.) category of the 1978 Colgate Series. It was the sixth edition of the tournament and was held from November 6 through November 12, 1978. Third-seeded Virginia Wade won the title and earned $14,000 first-prize money.

== Finals ==
=== Singles ===
(United Kingdom) Virginia Wade defeated (United States) Anna-Maria Fernandez 6–4, 7–6^{(7–1)}

- It was Wade's 2nd title of the year and the 54th of her career.

=== Doubles ===
(United States) Martina Navratilova / (United States) Anne Smith defeated (Australia) Kerry Reid / (Australia) Wendy Turnbull 7–6^{(7–4)}, 6–3

== Prize money ==
Event	W	F	SF	QF	Round of 16	Round of 32
Singles	$14,000	$7,100 (Note: Because Anna-Maria Fernandez was an amateur player her prize-money went to the Women's Tennis Association (WTA).)	$3,500	$1,850	$1,000	$550
