= St. Petersburg WCT =

Defunct tennis tournament
- Tour: World Championship Tennis
- Founded: 1974
- Abolished: 1975
- Editions: 2
- Location: St. Petersburg, Florida, U.S
- Surface: Hard / outdoor

The St. Petersburg WCT was a men's tennis tournament founded in 1953 as the Masters Invitational in St Augustine, Florida. In 1954 that event moved to Jacksonville, Florida until 1959. In 1960 the event moved to St Petersburg. It remained at the former location until 1971. After the men's event St Petersburg Masters Invitational finished in 1971 the women's event continued as the Virginia Slims Masters St Petersburg. In 1974 the men's tournament was revived as St. Petersburg WCT until 1975 when it was abolished. The women's tournament continued under various brand names and various locations in the Tampa Bay Area until it was discontinued in 1990. The event was part of the WCT Tour and was played on outdoor hard courts.

== History ==
In 1953 Masters Invitational tournament was established at the St Augustine Tennis Club, St Augustine, Florida and played on outdoor clay courts. In 1954 the Masters event was moved to Jacksonville, Florida through till 1959. In 1959 it changed location to St Petersburg, Florida, where it remained under that brand name until 1965. In 1966 the tournaments name was changed to the St. Petersburg Masters Invitational until 1970 when the women's event became known as the Virginia Slims Masters St Petersburg, the men's tournament continued under the same name until 1971 when it was discontinued. The tournament was part Florida-Caribbean Circuit which was a major feature of the international tennis scene in the 1960s and early 1970s.

The women's event continued under brand name VS Masters of St Petersburg until 1973 when it was rebranded as the St. Petersburg Masters Invitational In 1974 a new sponsor was found and the event became known as the Barnett Bank Masters until 1974 when it was discontinued. In 1977 the tournament was revived as the Florida Federal Open until 1985, and in 1986 becoming the Eckerd Open until it was abolished. The tournament was played on outdoor clay courts from 1953 to 1974 and from 1987 to 1990. It was played on outdoor hard courts from 1977 to 1986.

The holding of men's tournaments in the Tampa Bay Area were not as consistent as the women's event in 1974 the former St Petersburg Masters Invitational was revived and rebranded as the St. Petersburg WCT from 1974 to 1975 before that was discontinued. In 1981 a Tampa Open men's tournament held in Tampa, Florida through till 1983.

== Finals ==
=== Singles ===
For previous winners of this event see St. Petersburg Masters Invitational
| Year | Champions | Runners-up | Score |
| 1974 | (Australia) John Newcombe | (Soviet Union) Alex Metreveli | 6–0, 7–6 |
| 1975 | (Mexico) Raúl Ramírez | (United States) Roscoe Tanner | 6–0, 1–6, 6–2 |

=== Doubles ===
| Year | Champions | Runners-up | Score |
|---|---|---|---|
| 1974 | (Australia) Owen Davidson (Australia) John Newcombe | (United States) Clark Graebner (United States) Charlie Pasarell | 4–6, 6–3, 6–4 |
| 1975 | (United States) Brian Gottfried (Mexico) Raúl Ramírez | (United States) Charlie Pasarell (United States) Roscoe Tanner | 6–4, 6–4 |
