= 1984 Florida Federal Open =

- Date: October 8–14
- Edition: 12th
- Draw: 32S / 16D
- Prize money: $150,000
- Surface: Hard / outdoors
- Location: Tarpon Springs, Florida. U.S.
- Venue: Innisbrook Resort

Champions

Singles
- (United States) Michelle Torres

Doubles
- (Canada) Carling Bassett / (Australia) Elizabeth Smylie
← 1983 ·	Florida Federal Open	· 1985 →

The 1984 Florida Federal Open was a women's tennis tournament played on outdoor hard courts at the Innisbrook Resort in Tampa, Florida in the United States that was part of the 1984 Virginia Slims World Championship Series. The tournament was held from October 8 through October 14, 1984. Seventh-seeded Michelle Casati won the singles title.

== Finals ==
=== Singles ===
(United States) Michelle Torres defeated (Canada) Carling Bassett 6–1, 7–6^{(7–4)}

- It was Torres' only singles title of her career.

=== Doubles ===
(Canada) Carling Bassett / (Australia) Elizabeth Smylie defeated (United States) Mary-Lou Daniels / (United States) Wendy White-Prausa 6–4, 6–3

- It was Bassett-Seguso's 1st title of the year and the 2nd of her career. It was Smylie's 4th title of the year and the 8th of her career.
