= 1995 Comcast U.S. Indoor =

- Date: February 20–27
- Edition: 28th
- Category: Championship Series
- Draw: 32S / 16D
- Prize money: $589,250
- Surface: Carpet / indoor
- Location: Philadelphia, U.S.
- Venue: CoreStates Spectrum
- Attendance: 61,896

Champions

Singles
- (Sweden) Thomas Enqvist

Doubles
- (United States) Jim Grabb / (United States) Jonathan Stark
← 1994 ·	U.S. Pro Indoor	· 1996 →

The 1995 Comcast U.S. Indoor was a men's tennis tournament played on indoor carpet courts that was part of the Championship Series of the 1995 ATP Tour. It was the 28th edition of the tournament and was played at the CoreStates Spectrum in Philadelphia, Pennsylvania in the United States from February 20 to February 27, 1995. Unseeded Thomas Enqvist won the singles title.

== Finals ==
=== Singles ===
(Sweden) Thomas Enqvist defeated (United States) Michael Chang 0–6, 6–4, 6–0

- It was Enqvist's 2nd singles title of the year and the 4th of his career.

=== Doubles ===
(United States) Jim Grabb / (United States) Jonathan Stark defeated (Netherlands) Jacco Eltingh / (Netherlands) Paul Haarhuis 7–6, 6–7, 6–3

- It was Grabb's 1st title of the year and the 18th of his career. It was Stark's 2nd title of the year and the 14th of his career.
