= 1997 Advanta Championships – Doubles =

Doubles
- 1997 Advanta Championships

Final
- Champions: (Canada) Sébastien Lareau (United States) Alex O'Brien
- Runners-up: (South Africa) Ellis Ferreira (United States) Patrick Galbraith
- Score: 6–3, 6–3

Details
- Draw: 16
- Seeds: 4

Events
Singles	Doubles
- Advanta Championships

Todd Woodbridge and Mark Woodforde were the defending champions but did not compete that year.

Sébastien Lareau and Alex O'Brien won in the final 6–3, 6–3 against Ellis Ferreira and Patrick Galbraith.

== Seeds ==
1. (Australia) ~~Todd Woodbridge~~ / (Australia) ~~Mark Woodforde~~ (withdrew)
2. (Zimbabwe) Byron Black / (Canada) Grant Connell (first round)
3. (Netherlands) Jacco Eltingh / (Netherlands) Paul Haarhuis (quarterfinals)
4. (South Africa) Ellis Ferreira / (United States) Patrick Galbraith (final)

== Draw ==
Key

- Q = Qualifier
- WC = Wild card
- LL = Lucky loser
- Alt = Alternate
- ITF = ITF entry
- PR = Protected ranking
- SR = Special ranking
- SE = Special exempt
- JE = Junior exempt
- JR = Junior Accelerator Programme entrant
- CO = College Accelerator Programme entrant
- NG = Next Gen Accelerator Program entrant
- w/o = Walkover
- r = Retired
- d = Defaulted

First round
LL	(Australia) P Cash (United States) J Waite	6	6
WC	(United States) P McEnroe (United States) J Palmer	2	3
WC	(United States) L Jensen (United States) M Jensen	6	6
(United States) J Grabb (South Africa) G Muller	3	4
4	(South Africa) E Ferreira (United States) P Galbraith	6	6	6
(United States) T Kronemann (Australia) D Macpherson	7	2	2
(France) J-P Fleurian (Australia) P Rafter	2	6
WC	(United States) J Gimelstob (New Zealand) B Steven	6	7
(Argentina) L Lobo (Netherlands) S Schalken	1	6	0
(Spain) T Carbonell (Spain) F Roig	6	2	6
Q	(Argentina) J Frana (Venezuela) N Pereira	3	6	1
3	(Netherlands) J Eltingh (Netherlands) P Haarhuis	6	3	6
(Sweden) J Björkman (United States) R Leach	3	6	4
(Canada) S Lareau (United States) A O'Brien	6	4	6
(Australia) J Eagle (Australia) A Florent	6	6
2	(Zimbabwe) B Black (Canada) G Connell	2	4

Quarterfinals
LL	(Australia) P Cash (United States) J Waite	7	6
WC	(United States) L Jensen (United States) M Jensen	6	2
4	(South Africa) E Ferreira (United States) P Galbraith	6	6
WC	(United States) J Gimelstob (New Zealand) B Steven	3	4
(Spain) T Carbonell (Spain) F Roig	7	3	6
3	(Netherlands) J Eltingh (Netherlands) P Haarhuis	6	6	2
(Canada) S Lareau (United States) A O'Brien	6	3	7
(Australia) J Eagle (Australia) A Florent	3	6	5

Semifinals
LL	(Australia) P Cash (United States) J Waite	3	1
4	(South Africa) E Ferreira (United States) P Galbraith	6	6
(Spain) T Carbonell (Spain) F Roig	6	6	2
(Canada) S Lareau (United States) A O'Brien	4	7	6

Final
4	(South Africa) E Ferreira (United States) P Galbraith	3	3
(Canada) S Lareau (United States) A O'Brien	6	6
