= Marco Cacopardo =

American tennis player

- Country (sports): United States
- Born: December 15, 1969 (age 56)
- Height: 6 ft 5 in (196 cm)

Singles
- Career record: 0–1
- Highest ranking: No. 554 (Nov 13, 1995)

Doubles
- Highest ranking: No. 712 (Apr 19, 1993)

Marco Cacopardo (born December 15, 1969) is an American former professional tennis player.

Cacopardo grew up in Forest Hills, New York, where he was a five-minute walk from the US Open complex. He won the U.S. national amateur championships in both 1988 and 1991. His professional tennis career was stalled by a series of family bereavements. In 1992 he left the tour to care for his ailing grandmother, who had looked after him and his sister after the death of their parents. He spent two years away from the sport before returning and was a main draw qualifier at the 1995 U.S. Indoor in Philadelphia, losing his first round match to Mark Woodforde.
