= 1996 Comcast U.S. Indoor =

- Date: February 26 – March 3
- Edition: 29th
- Category: Championship Series
- Draw: 32S / 16D
- Prize money: $589,250
- Surface: Carpet / indoor
- Location: Philadelphia, PA, U.S.
- Venue: CoreStates Spectrum
- Attendance: 40,058

Champions

Singles
- (United States) Jim Courier

Doubles
- (Australia) Todd Woodbridge / (Australia) Mark Woodforde
- U.S. Pro Indoor

The 1996 Comcast U.S. Indoor was a men's tennis tournament played on indoor carpet courts at the CoreStates Spectrum in Philadelphia, Pennsylvania in the United States and was part of the Championship Series of the 1996 ATP Tour. It was the 29th edition of the tournament and ran from February 26 through March 3, 1996. Second-seeded Jim Courier won the singles title.

== Finals ==
=== Singles ===
(United States) Jim Courier defeated (United States) Chris Woodruff 6–4, 6–3

- It was Courier's only singles title of the year and the 19th of his career.

=== Doubles ===
(Australia) Todd Woodbridge / (Australia) Mark Woodforde defeated (Zimbabwe) Byron Black / (Canada) Grant Connell 7–6, 6–2

- It was Woodbridge's 2nd title of the year and the 42nd of his career. It was Woodforde's 3rd title of the year and the 46th of his career.
