= 1977 Florida Federal Open =

- Date: September 26 – October 2
- Edition: 5th
- Category: Colgate Series (A)
- Draw: 32S / 16D
- Prize money: $35,000
- Surface: Hard / outdoor
- Location: Palm Harbor, Florida, U.S.

Champions

Singles
- (Romania) Virginia Ruzici

Doubles
- (South Africa) Linky Boshoff / (South Africa) Ilana Kloss
← 1974 ·	Eckerd Open	· 1978 →

The 1977 Florida Federal Open was a women's singles tennis tournament played on outdoor hard courts in Palm Harbor, Florida in the United States. The event was part of the A (Note: Tournaments with prize money for the women of at least $35,000.) category of the 1977 Colgate Series. It was the fifth edition of the tournament and was held from September 26 through October 2, 1977. Unseeded Virginia Ruzici won the title and earned $6,000 first-prize money.

== Finals ==
=== Singles ===
(Romania) Virginia Ruzici defeated (United States) Laura DuPont 6–4, 4–6, 6–2

- It was Ruzici's 2nd singles title of the year and the 6th of her career.

=== Doubles ===
(South Africa) Linky Boshoff / (South Africa) Ilana Kloss defeated (South Africa) Brigitte Cuypers / (South Africa) Marise Kruger 7–6^{(7–4)}, 6–3

== Prize money ==
Event	W	F	SF	QF	Round of 16	Round of 32
Singles	$6,000	$3,000	$1,550	$900	$600	$325
