= 1997 Advanta Championships =

- Date: February 24 – March 2
- Edition: 30th
- Category: Championship Series
- Draw: 32S /16D
- Prize money: $589,250
- Surface: Hard / indoor
- Location: Philadelphia, PA, U.S.
- Venue: CoreStates Center
- Attendance: 39,145

Champions

Singles
- (United States) Pete Sampras

Doubles
- (Canada) Sébastien Lareau / (United States) Alex O'Brien
- U.S. Pro Indoor

The 1997 Advanta Championships was a men's tennis tournament played on indoor hard courts at the CoreStates Center in Philadelphia, Pennsylvania in the United States and was part of the Championship Series of the 1997 ATP Tour. It was the 30th edition of the tournament and was held from February 24 through March 2, 1997. First-seeded Pete Sampras won the singles title, his third at the event after 1990 and 1992, and earned $100,000 first-prize money.

== Finals ==
=== Singles ===
(United States) Pete Sampras defeated (Australia) Patrick Rafter 5–7, 7–6^{(7–4)}, 6–3

- It was Sampras' 3rd singles title of the year and the 47th of his career.

=== Doubles ===
(Canada) Sébastien Lareau / (United States) Alex O'Brien defeated (South Africa) Ellis Ferreira / (United States) Patrick Galbraith 6–3, 6–3

- It was Lareau's 1st title of the year and the 4th of his career. It was O'Brien's 1st title of the year and the 4th of his career.
