= 1979 Florida Federal Open =

- Date: October 22–28
- Edition: 7th
- Category: Colgate Series (AAA)
- Draw: 32S/16D
- Prize money: $100,000
- Surface: Hard / outdoor
- Location: Oldsmar, United States
- Venue: East Lake Woodlands Country Club
- Attendance: 41,903

Champions

Singles
- (Australia) Evonne Goolagong Cawley

Doubles
- (United States) Anne Smith / (Romania) Virginia Ruzici
← 1978 ·	Eckerd Open	· 1980 →

The 1979 Florida Federal Open was a women's singles tennis tournament played on outdoor hard courts at East Lake Woodlands Country Club in Oldsmar, Florida in the United States. The event was part of the AAA (Note: Tournaments with prize money for the women of at least $100,000.) category of the 1979 Colgate Series. It was the seventh edition of the tournament and was held from October 22 through October 28, 1979. Third-seeded Evonne Goolagong Cawley won the title, defeating defending champion Virginia Wade in the final, and earned $20,000 first-prize money.

== Finals ==
=== Singles ===
(Australia) Evonne Goolagong Cawley defeated (United Kingdom) Virginia Wade 6–0, 6–3

- It was Goolagong Cawley's 4th title of the year and the 81st of her career.

=== Doubles ===
(United States) Anne Smith / (Romania) Virginia Ruzici defeated (South Africa) Ilana Kloss / (United States) Betty-Ann Stuart 7–5, 4–6, 7–5

== Prize money ==
Event	W	F	SF	QF	Round of 16	Round of 32
Singles	$20,000	$10,000	$4,500	$2,100	$1,100	$550
