= 1983 Florida Federal Open =

Tennis tournament

- Date: October 10–16
- Edition: 11th
- Draw: 32S / 16D
- Prize money: $150,000
- Surface: Hard / outdoors
- Location: Tampa, Florida, U.S.
- Venue: Innisbrook Resort and Golf Club

Champions

Singles
- (United States) Martina Navratilova

Doubles
- (United States) Martina Navratilova / (United States) Pam Shriver
- Florida Federal Open

The 1983 Florida Federal Open was a women's tennis tournament played on outdoor hard courts at the Innisbrook Resort and Golf Club in Tampa, Florida in the United States that was part of the 1983 Virginia Slims World Championship Series. It was the 11th edition of the tournament and was held from October 10 through October 16, 1983. First-seeded Martina Navratilova won the singles title and earned $28,000 first-prize money.

== Finals ==
=== Singles ===
(United States) Martina Navratilova defeated (United States) Pam Shriver 6–3, 6–2

- It was Navratilova's 13th singles title of the year and the 83rd of her career.

=== Doubles ===
(United States) Martina Navratilova / (United States) Pam Shriver defeated (United States) Bonnie Gadusek / (United States) Wendy White 6–0, 6–1

- It was Navratilova's 23rd title of the year and the 175th of her career. It was Shriver's 12th title of the year and the 46th of her career.

== Prize money ==
Event	W	F	SF	QF	Round of 16	Round of 32
Singles	$28,000	$14,000	$7,000	$3,350	$1,675	$825
