= Tampa Open =

Defunct tennis tournament
- Event name: Tampa Open
- Tour: Grand Prix circuit
- Founded: 1980
- Abolished: 1983
- Editions: 4
- Location: Tampa, Florida, U.S.
- Surface: Hard (1980–82); Carpet (1983)

The Tampa Open is a defunct Grand Prix affiliated men's tennis tournament played from 1980 to 1983. It was held in the Tampa Bay area, Florida in the United States and played on outdoor hard courts from 1980 to 1982 and on indoor carpet courts in 1983. The first three editions were played at the East Lake Woodlands Golf and Country Club while the last edition was held at the USF Sun Dome.

== Finals ==
=== Singles ===
Year	Champions	Runners-up	Score
1980	(Australia) Paul McNamee	(United States) Stan Smith	6–4, 6–3
1981	(United States) Mel Purcell	(United States) Jeff Borowiak	4–6, 6–4, 6–3
1982	(United States) Brian Gottfried	(United States) Mike Estep	6–7^{(6–8)}, 6–2, 6–4
1983	(United States) Johan Kriek	(United States) Robert Lutz	6–2, 6–4

=== Doubles ===
Year	Champions	Runners-up	Score
1980	(Australia) Paul Kronk (Australia) Paul McNamee	(Australia) Steve Docherty (Australia) John James	6–4, 7–5
1981	(South Africa) Bernard Mitton (United States) Butch Walts	(Australia) David Carter (Australia) Paul Kronk	6–3, 3–6, 6–1
1982	(United States) Tim Gullikson (United States) Tom Gullikson	(United States) Brian Gottfried (United States) Hank Pfister	6–2, 6–3
1983	(United States) Tony Giammalva (United States) Steve Meister	(United States) Eric Fromm (United States) Drew Gitlin	3–6, 6–1, 7–5

== See also ==
- Eckerd Open – women's tournament (1971–1990) held in Tampa Bay Area
