= 1997 Advanta Championships – Singles =

Singles
- 1997 Advanta Championships

Final
- Champion: (United States) Pete Sampras
- Runner-up: (Australia) Patrick Rafter
- Score: 5–7, 7–6^{(7–4)}, 6–3

Details
- Draw: 32
- Seeds: 8

Events
Singles	Doubles
- U.S. Pro Indoor

Jim Courier was the defending champion but lost in the second round to Grant Stafford.

Pete Sampras won in the final 5–7, 7–6^{(7–4)}, 6–3 against Patrick Rafter.

== Seeds ==
A champion seed is indicated in bold text while text in italics indicates the round in which that seed was eliminated.

1. (United States) **Pete Sampras (champion)**
2. (United States) Jim Courier (second round)
3. (Netherlands) Paul Haarhuis (second round)
4. (United States) Richey Reneberg (withdrew — bruised hip muscle)
5. (Australia) Jason Stoltenberg (first round)
6. (Australia) Todd Woodbridge (second round)
7. (United States) Alex O'Brien (first round)
8. (United Kingdom) Greg Rusedski (first round)

== Draw ==
Key

- Q = Qualifier
- WC = Wild card
- LL = Lucky loser
- Alt = Alternate
- ITF = ITF entry
- PR = Protected ranking
- SR = Special ranking
- SE = Special exempt
- JE = Junior exempt
- JR = Junior Accelerator Programme entrant
- CO = College Accelerator Programme entrant
- NG = Next Gen Accelerator Program entrant
- w/o = Walkover
- r = Retired
- d = Defaulted

=== Finals ===
Semifinals
1	(United States) **Pete Sampras**	3	**7**	**6**
Q	(Netherlands) Sjeng Schalken	**6**	5	3
(Australia) **Patrick Rafter**	**6**	**6**
(South Africa) Grant Stafford	3	4

Final
1	(United States) **Pete Sampras**	5	**7^{7}**	**6**
(Australia) Patrick Rafter	**7**	6^{4}	3

=== Top half ===
First round
1	(United States) **P Sampras**	**6**	**6**
(Uruguay) M Filippini	4	1
(Sweden) **J Björkman**	**6**	**6**
WC	(Australia) P Cash	4	0
Q	(Canada) S Lareau	4	3
Q	(United States) **D Flach**	**6**	**6**
(Sweden) **T Johansson**	**6**	**6**
8	(United Kingdom) G Rusedski	4	2
3	(Netherlands) **P Haarhuis**	**6**	1	**6**
(Czech Republic) J Novák	4	**6**	3
(United States) **J Stark**	**7^{10}**	**7^{7}**
WC	(United States) P McEnroe	6^{8}	6^{4}
(Denmark) **K Carlsen**	4	**6**	**6**
(Spain) T Carbonell	**6**	4	2
Q	(Netherlands) **S Schalken**	**6**	**6**
5	(Australia) J Stoltenberg	2	4

Second round
1	(United States) **P Sampras**	**7**	**7^{7}**
(Sweden) J Björkman	5	6^{2}
Q	(United States) **D Flach**	**6**	0	**7^{7}**
(Sweden) T Johansson	3	**6**	6^{4}
3	(Netherlands) P Haarhuis	3	4
(United States) **J Stark**	**6**	**6**
(Denmark) K Carlsen	6^{7}	**6**	3
Q	(Netherlands) **S Schalken**	**7^{9}**	4	**6**

Quarterfinals
1	(United States) **P Sampras**	**6**	**6**
Q	(United States) D Flach	4	2
(United States) J Stark	2	4
Q	(Netherlands) **S Schalken**	**6**	**6**

Semifinals
1	(United States) **P Sampras**	3	**7**	**6**
Q	(Netherlands) S Schalken	**6**	5	3

=== Bottom half ===
First round
6	(Australia) **T Woodbridge**	**6**	1
(Russia) A Chesnokov	3	0^{r}
Q	(Australia) R Fromberg	4	3
(Zimbabwe) **B Black**	**6**	**6**
(Australia) M Woodforde	2	2
(Australia) **P Rafter**	**6**	**6**
WC	(United States) **J Gimelstob**	**6**	**6**
LL	(United States) M Joyce	0	3
7	(United States) A O'Brien	2	**6**	3
(Spain) **J A Viloca**	**6**	3	**6**
(United States) V Spadea	6^{3}	**7**	1
(Australia) **S Stolle**	**7^{7}**	5	**6**
(South Africa) **G Stafford**	**6**	**6**
(Germany) A Rădulescu	4	3
(France) G Raoux	3	6^{4}
2	(United States) **J Courier**	**6**	**7^{7}**

Second round
6	(Australia) T Woodbridge	2	0
(Zimbabwe) **B Black**	**6**	**6**
(Australia) **P Rafter**	**6**	5	**7**
WC	(United States) J Gimelstob	3	**7**	5
(Spain) J A Viloca	**6**	3	4
(Australia) **S Stolle**	4	**6**	**6**
(South Africa) **G Stafford**	**6**	5	**6**
2	(United States) J Courier	3	**7**	2

Quarterfinals
(Zimbabwe) B Black	3	**6**	1
(Australia) **P Rafter**	**6**	1	**6**
(Australia) S Stolle	4	2
(South Africa) **G Stafford**	**6**	**6**

Semifinals
(Australia) **P Rafter**	**6**	**6**
(South Africa) G Stafford	3	4
