= Eckerd Open =

Defunct tennis tournament
- Event name: 1953–1965 Masters Invitational (1953–65); St Petersburg Masters (1966–70); Virginia Slims Masters of St Petersburg (1971–72); St Petersburg Masters Invitational (1973); Barnett Bank Masters (1974); 1977–1985 Florida Federal Open (1977–85); Eckerd Open
- Tour: WTA Tour (1977–90)
- Founded: 1953; 73 years ago
- Abolished: 1990; 36 years ago
- Location: Tampa Bay Area, Florida, U.S.
- Surface: Clay (1971–74); Hard (1977–86); Clay (1987–90)

The Eckerd Open is a defunct WTA Tour affiliated women's tennis tournament founded in 1953 as a combined men's and women's clay court tennis tournament called the Masters Invitational tournament in St Augustine, Florida. In 1954 that event moved to Jacksonville, Florida until 1959. In 1960 the event moved to St Petersburg. It remained at the former location until 1974. After the combined event the St. Petersburg Masters Invitational finished in 1970. The women's event continued under various brand names and various locations in the Tampa Bay Area until it was abolished in 1990.

== History ==
In 1953 Masters Invitational tournament was established at the St Augustine Tennis Club, St Augustine, Florida and played on outdoor clay courts. In 1954 the Masters event was moved to Jacksonville, Florida through till 1959. In 1959 it changed location to St Petersburg, Florida, where it remained under that brand name until 1965. In 1966 the tournament's name was changed to the St. Petersburg Masters Invitational until 1970 when the women's event became known as the Virginia Slims Masters of St Petersburg, the men's tournament continued under the same name until 1971 when it was discontinued. The tournament was part South Florida-Caribbean Circuit which was a major feature of the international tennis scene in the 1960s and early 1970s.

The women's event continued under brand name VS Masters of St Petersburg until 1973 when it was rebranded as the St. Petersburg Masters Invitational In 1974 a new sponsor was found and the event became known as the Barnett Bank Masters until 1974 when it was discontinued. In 1977 the tournament was revived as the Florida Federal Open until 1985, and in 1986 becoming the Eckerd Open until it was abolished. The tournament was played on outdoor clay courts from 1953 to 1974 and from 1987 to 1990. It was played on outdoor hard courts from 1977 to 1986.

The holding of men's tournaments in the Tampa Bay Area were not as consistent as the women's event in 1974 the former St Petersburg Masters Invitational was revived as the St. Petersburg WCT from 1974 to 1975 before that was discontinued. In 1981 a Tampa Open men's tournament held in Tampa, Florida through till 1983.

== Locations ==
Played from 1953 to 1990 in various locations in the Tampa Bay Area, Florida in the United States. St Augustine, Florida from 1953 to 1954, then Jacksonville, Florida from 1955 to 1959, then it was held in St. Petersburg, Florida from 1960 to 1974, Palm Harbor, Florida in 1977, in Clearwater, Florida in 1978 and in Tampa, Florida from 1979 to 1990.

== Event names ==
- 1953–1965 Masters Invitational
- 1966–1970 St Petersburg Masters Invitational
- 1971–1972 Virginia Slims Masters of St Petersburg
- 1973 St Petersburg Masters Invitational
- 1974 Barnett Bank Masters
- 1977–1985 Florida Federal Open
- 1986–1990 Eckerd Open

== Results ==
=== Singles ===
For previous winners of this event see St. Petersburg Masters Invitational
Year	Champion	Runner-up	Score
Virginia Slims Masters of St Petersburg
1971	(United States) Chris Evert	(United States) Julie Heldman	6–1, 6–2
1972	(United States) Nancy Gunter	(United States) Chris Evert	6–3, 6–4
St Petersburg Masters Invitational
1973	(United States) Chris Evert	(Australia) Evonne Goolagong	6–2, 0–6, 6–4
Barnett Bank Masters
1974	(United States) Chris Evert	(Australia) Kerry Reid	6–0, 6–1
1975/1976	Not held		
Florida Federal Open
1977	(Romania) Virginia Ruzici	(United States) Laura duPont	6–4, 4–6, 6–2
1978	(United Kingdom) Virginia Wade	(United States) Anna-Maria Fernandez	6–4, 7–6^{(7–1)}
1979	(Australia) Evonne Goolagong Cawley	(United Kingdom) Virginia Wade	6–0, 6–3
1980	(United States) Andrea Jaeger	(United States) Tracy Austin	Walkover
1981	(United States) Martina Navratilova	(West Germany) Bettina Bunge	5–7, 6–2, 6–0
1982	(United States) Chris Evert-Lloyd	(United States) Andrea Jaeger	3–6, 6–1, 6–4
1983	(United States) Martina Navratilova	(United States) Pam Shriver	6–3, 6–2
1984	(United States) Michelle Torres	(Canada) Carling Bassett	6–1, 7–6
1985	(United States) Stephanie Rehe	(Argentina) Gabriela Sabatini	6–4, 6–7, 7–5
Eckerd Open
1986	(United States) Lori McNeil	(United States) Zina Garrison	2–6, 7–5, 6–2
1987	(United States) Chris Evert-Lloyd	(United States) Kate Gompert	6–3, 6–2
1988	(United States) Chris Evert	(Spain) Arantxa Sánchez Vicario	7–6, 6–4
1989	(Spain) Conchita Martínez	(Argentina) Gabriela Sabatini	6–3, 6–2
1990	(Socialist Federal Republic of Yugoslavia) Monica Seles	(Bulgaria) Katerina Maleeva	6–1, 6–0

=== Doubles ===
Year	Champion	Runner-up	Score
Virginia Slims Masters of St Petersburg
1971	(France) Françoise Dürr (United Kingdom) Ann Haydon-Jones	(Australia) Judy Tegart (United States) Julie Heldman	7–6, 3–6, 6–3
1972	(Australia) Karen Krantzcke (United States) Wendy Overton	(Australia) Judy Tegart (France) Françoise Dürr	7–5, 6–4
St Petersburg Masters Invitational
1973	(Australia) Chris Evert (United States) Jeanne Evert	(Australia) Evonne Goolagong (Australia) Janet Young	6–2, 7–6
Barnett Bank Masters
1974	(Soviet Union) Olga Morozova (Netherlands) Betty Stöve	(United States) Chris Evert (Australia) Evonne Goolagong	6–4, 6–2
1975/1976	Not held		
Florida Federal Open
1977	(South Africa) Delina Ann Boshoff (South Africa) Ilana Kloss	(South Africa) Brigitte Cuypers (South Africa) Marise Kruger	6–7, 6–2, 6–2
1978	(United States) Martina Navratilova (United States) Anne Smith	(Australia) Kerry Reid (Australia) Wendy Turnbull	7–6^{(7–4)}, 6–3
1979	(Romania) Virginia Ruzici (United States) Anne Smith	(South Africa) Ilana Kloss (United States) Betty Ann Grubb Stuart	7–5, 4–6, 7–5
1980	(United States) Rosemary Casals (United States) Candy Reynolds	(United States) Anne Smith (United States) Paula Smith	7–6, 7–5
1981	(United States) Rosemary Casals (Australia) Wendy Turnbull	(United States) Martina Navratilova (Czechoslovakia) Renáta Tomanová	6–3, 6–4
1982	(United States) Ann Kiyomura (United States) Paula Smith	(United States) Mary-Lou Piatek (United States) Wendy White	6–2, 6–4
1983	(United States) Martina Navratilova (United States) Pam Shriver	(United States) Bonnie Gadusek (United States) Wendy White	6–0, 6–1
1984	(Canada) Carling Bassett (Australia) Elizabeth Sayers	(United States) Mary-Lou Piatek (United States) Wendy White	6–4, 6–3
1985	(Canada) Carling Bassett (Argentina) Gabriela Sabatini	(United States) Lisa Bonder (Peru) Laura Arraya	6–0, 6–0
Eckerd Open
1986	(United States) Elise Burgin (South Africa) Rosalyn Fairbank	(United States) Gigi Fernández (United States) Kim Sands	7–5, 6–2
1987	(United States) Chris Evert-Lloyd (Australia) Wendy Turnbull	(United States) Elise Burgin (South Africa) Rosalyn Fairbank	6–4, 6–3
1988	(United States) Terry Phelps (Italy) Raffaella Reggi	(United States) Cammy MacGregor (United States) Cynthia MacGregor	6–2, 6–4
1989	(Netherlands) Brenda Schultz (Hungary) Andrea Temesvári	(United States) Elise Burgin (South Africa) Rosalyn Fairbank	7–6, 6–4
1990	(Argentina) Mercedes Paz (Spain) Arantxa Sánchez Vicario	(Italy) Sandra Cecchini (Peru) Laura Gildemeister	6–2, 6–0

== See also ==
- St. Petersburg WCT (for history of the men's tournament)
- Tampa Open – men's tournament (1981–1983) held in Tampa, Florida
