= Open Era tennis records – Women's singles =

WTA Tour – Open era records

The Open Era is the current era of professional tennis. It began in 1968 when the Grand Slam tournaments allowed professional players to compete with amateurs, ending the division that had persisted in men's tennis since the dawn of the sport in the 19th century. The first "open" tournament was held in Bournemouth, England, followed by the inaugural open Grand Slam tournament a month later. All records are based on data from the Women's Tennis Association (WTA), the International Tennis Federation (ITF), and the official sites of the four Grand Slam tournaments. Active streaks and active players are in boldface.

== Grand Slam totals ==
Active streaks and active players are in boldface.

=== Career totals ===
#	Titles
23	(United States) **Serena Williams**
22	(Germany) Steffi Graf
18	(United States) Chris Evert
18	(Czech Republic) / (United States) Martina Navratilova
11	(Australia) Margaret Court
9	(Socialist Federal Republic of Yugoslavia) / (United States) Monica Seles
8	(United States) Billie Jean King
7	(Australia) Evonne Goolagong
7	(Belgium) Justine Henin
7	(United States) **Venus Williams**

#	Finals	W–L
34	(United States) Chris Evert	18–16
33	(United States) **Serena Williams**	23–10
32	(Czech Republic) / (United States) Martina Navratilova	18–14
31	(West Germany) Steffi Graf	22–9
18	(Australia) Evonne Goolagong	7–11
16	(United States) **Venus Williams**	7–9
13	(Socialist Federal Republic of Yugoslavia) / (United States) Monica Seles	9–4
12	(Australia) Margaret Court	11–1
12	(United States) Billie Jean King	8–4
12	(Belgium) Justine Henin	7–5
12	(Switzerland) Martina Hingis	5–7
12	(Spain) Arantxa Sánchez Vicario	4–8

#	Semifinals	W–L
52	(United States) Chris Evert	34–17
44	(Czechoslovakia) / (United States) Martina Navratilova	32–12
40	(United States) **Serena Williams**	33–7
37	(West Germany) Steffi Graf	30–6
23	(United States) **Venus Williams**	16–7
22	(Australia) Evonne Goolagong	18–4
22	(Spain) Arantxa Sánchez Vicario	12–10
20	(Russia) Maria Sharapova	10–10
19	(Switzerland) Martina Hingis	12–7
18	(Socialist Federal Republic of Yugoslavia) / (United States) Monica Seles	13–5
18	(United States) Lindsay Davenport	7–11
18	(Argentina) Gabriela Sabatini	3–15

#	Quarterfinals	W–L
54	(United States) Chris Evert	52–2
54	(United States) **Serena Williams**	40–14
53	(Czechoslovakia) / (United States) Martina Navratilova	44–9
42	(West Germany) Steffi Graf	37–5
39	(United States) **Venus Williams**	23–16
35	(Spain) Arantxa Sánchez Vicario	22–13
31	(Socialist Federal Republic of Yugoslavia) / (United States) Monica Seles	18–13
31	(United States) Lindsay Davenport	18–13
28	(Argentina) Gabriela Sabatini	18–10
28	(United States) Billie Jean King	17–11

#	Appearances
95	(United States) **Venus Williams**
82	(United States) **Serena Williams**
72	(France) Alizé Cornet
71	(United States) Amy Frazier
71	(Russia) Svetlana Kuznetsova
70	(Italy) Francesca Schiavone
69	(Australia) Sam Stosur
69	(Belarus) **Victoria Azarenka**
69	(Romania) **Sorana Cirstea**
67	(Czechoslovakia) / (United States) Martina Navratilova
67	**Anastasia Pavlyuchenkova**

=== Matches ===
#	Matches played
423	(United States) Serena Williams
357	(United States) **Venus Williams**
355	(Czechoslovakia) / (United States) Martina Navratilova
336	(United States) Chris Evert
310	(West Germany) Steffi Graf
264	(Spain) Arantxa Sánchez Vicario
250	(Russia) Maria Sharapova
249	(United States) Lindsay Davenport
237	(Spain) Conchita Martínez
232	(Belarus) **Victoria Azarenka**
minimum 200 matches

#	Matches won
367	(United States) Serena Williams
306	(Czechoslovakia) / (United States) Martina Navratilova
299	(United States) Chris Evert
278	(West Germany) Steffi Graf
271	(United States) **Venus Williams**
210	(Spain) Arantxa Sánchez Vicario
198	(United States) Lindsay Davenport
197	(Russia) Maria Sharapova
180	(Socialist Federal Republic of Yugoslavia) / (United States) Monica Seles
174	(Spain) Conchita Martínez
minimum 150 wins

Match record	%	W–L
(Australia) Margaret Court	90.7	97–10
(West Germany) Steffi Graf	89.7	278–32
(United States) Chris Evert	89.0	299–37
(United States) Serena Williams	86.6	367–57
(Czechoslovakia) / (United States) Martina Navratilova	86.2	306–49
(Socialist Federal Republic of Yugoslavia) / (United States) Monica Seles	85.4	181–31
(United States) Billie Jean King	84.1	127–24
(Belgium) Justine Henin	83.4	141–28
(Australia) Evonne Goolagong	83.1	128–26
(Switzerland) Martina Hingis	82.4	150–32
(Poland) **Iga Świątek**	82.3	116–25
minimum 90 wins

Finals record	%	W–L
(Poland) **Iga Świątek**	100	6–0
(Japan) **Naomi Osaka**	100	4–0
(United Kingdom) Virginia Wade	100	3–0
(United States) Jennifer Capriati	100	3–0
(Australia) Ashleigh Barty	100	3–0
(Australia) Margaret Court	91.7	11–1
(Germany) Angelique Kerber	75.0	3–1
(Kazakhstan) **Elena Rybakina**	75.0	3–1
(West Germany) Steffi Graf	71.0	22–9
(United States) Serena Williams	69.7	23–10
(Socialist Federal Republic of Yugoslavia) / (United States) Monica Seles	69.2	9–4
(United States) Billie Jean King	66.7	8–4
minimum 3 titles

=== Grand Slam tournament achievements ===
==== Grand Slam ====
Grand Slam	Player	First–last tournaments
Grand Slam	(Australia) Margaret Court	1970 Australian Open—1970 US Open
Grand Slam	(Germany) Steffi Graf	1988 Australian Open—1988 US Open
Grand Slam	all four major titles consecutively (in a calendar year)	

==== Non-Calendar Year Grand Slam ====
NCYGS	Player	First–last tournaments
NCYGS	(Australia) Margaret Court	1969 US Open—1970 Wimbledon
NCYGS	(United States) Martina Navratilova	1983 Wimbledon—1984 US Open (6 majors)
NCYGS	(Germany) Steffi Graf	1993 French Open—1994 Australian Open
NCYGS	(United States) Serena Williams	2002 French Open—2003 Australian Open
NCYGS	(United States) Serena Williams(2)	2014 US Open—2015 Wimbledon
NCYGS	all four major titles consecutively (not in a calendar year)	

==== Career Grand Slam ====
CGS	Player	Event of completion	Age
CGS	(Australia) Margaret Court	1970 US Open	27
CGS	(United States) Chris Evert	1982 Australian Open	27
CGS	(Czech Republic) Martina Navratilova	1983 US Open	26
CGS	(Germany) Steffi Graf	1988 US Open	19
CGS	(United States) Serena Williams	2003 Australian Open	21
CGS	(Russia) Maria Sharapova	2012 French Open	25
CGS	each Grand Slam title at least once		

Career Golden Slam*	Event of completion	Age
(Germany) Steffi Graf	1988 Summer Olympics	19
(United States) Serena Williams	2012 Summer Olympics	30
Career Grand Slam + Olympic Gold (since 1988)

Career Super Slam	Event of completion	Age
(Germany) Steffi Graf	1988 Summer Olympics	19
(United States) Serena Williams	2012 Summer Olympics	30
Career Golden Slam + Year-End Championship

==== Finals ====
Event of completion	Age	Player
1970 Wimbledon	27	(Australia) Margaret Court
1972 French Open	28	(United States) Billie Jean King
1973 US Open	22	(Australia) Evonne Goolagong Cawley
1975 US Open	20	(United States) Chris Evert
1981 Wimbledon	19	(Czechoslovakia) Hana Mandlíková
1981 US Open	24	(Czech Republic) / (United States) Martina Navratilova
1988 Australian Open	18	(West Germany) Steffi Graf
1992 Wimbledon	18	(Socialist Federal Republic of Yugoslavia) Monica Seles
1995 Wimbledon	23	(Spain) Arantxa Sánchez Vicario
1997 US Open	16	(Switzerland) Martina Hingis
2003 Australian Open	22	(United States) **Venus Williams**
2003 Australian Open	21	(United States) Serena Williams
2004 Australian Open	21	(Belgium) Justine Henin
2012 French Open	25	(Russia) Maria Sharapova
* Reached the final of each Grand Slam tournament at least once during career

==== Minimum at each Grand Slam tournament totals ====
#	Titles
4	(Germany) Steffi Graf
3	(United States) Serena Williams
2	(United States) Chris Evert
2	(Czech Republic) Martina Navratilova
1	(Australia) Margaret Court
1	(Russia) Maria Sharapova
minimum 1 each

#	Finals
6	(United States) Chris Evert
6	(Czech Republic) Martina Navratilova
5	(Germany) Steffi Graf
4	(United States) Serena Williams
2	(Australia) Margaret Court
2	(Australia) Evonne Goolagong Cawley
2	(Spain) Arantxa Sánchez Vicario
2	(Belgium) Justine Henin
minimum 2 each

#	Semifinals
6	(Czech Republic) Martina Navratilova
6	(United States) Chris Evert
5	(Germany) Steffi Graf
5	(United States) Serena Williams
4	(Argentina) Gabriela Sabatini
minimum 4 each

#	Quarterfinals
10	(United States) Serena Williams
9	(Czech Republic) Martina Navratilova
7	(Germany) Steffi Graf
6	(United States) Chris Evert
6	(Spain) Arantxa Sánchez Vicario
5	(Argentina) Gabriela Sabatini
5	(Socialist Federal Republic of Yugoslavia) Monica Seles
5	(United States) Jennifer Capriati
5	(United States) Venus Williams
minimum 5 each

#	Match wins
69	(United States) Serena Williams
48	(United States) Venus Williams
47	(Germany) Steffi Graf
46	(Czech Republic) Martina Navratilova
41	(Spain) Arantxa Sánchez Vicario
38	(Russia) Maria Sharapova
31	(United States) Lindsay Davenport
30	(United States) Chris Evert
30	(Socialist Federal Republic of Yugoslavia) Monica Seles
30	(Belgium) Justine Henin
30	(Belarus) **Victoria Azarenka**

=== Season totals ===
==== Match record ====
- minimum 20 wins

%	W–L	Player	Year
100	27–0	(West Germany) Steffi Graf	1988
100	26–0	(Australia) Margaret Court	1970
100	21–0	(Socialist Federal Republic of Yugoslavia) Monica Seles	1991
100	21–0	(West Germany) Steffi Graf	1995
100	21–0	(West Germany) Steffi Graf	1996
100	21–0	(United States) Serena Williams	2002
96.4	27–1	(West Germany) Steffi Graf	1989
96.4	27–1	(Socialist Federal Republic of Yugoslavia) Monica Seles	1992
96.4	27–1	(West Germany) Steffi Graf	1993
96.4	27–1	(Switzerland) Martina Hingis	1997

==== The Golden Slam and the Grand Slam ====
#	All 4 titles + Olympic gold medal*	Year
1	(West Germany) Steffi Graf	1988
*called the Golden Slam

#	All 4 titles*	Year
1	(Australia) Margaret Court	1970
1	(West Germany) Steffi Graf	1988
*called the Grand Slam

==== Other achievements ====
#	3+ titles	Year
5	(West Germany) Steffi Graf	1988–89, 93, 95–96
3	(Australia) Margaret Court	1969–70, 73
2	(United States) Martina Navratilova	1983–84
2	(Socialist Federal Republic of Yugoslavia) Monica Seles	1991–92
2	(United States) Serena Williams	2002, 15
1	(United States) Billie Jean King	1972
1	(Switzerland) Martina Hingis	1997

#	2+ titles	Year
7	(United States) Serena Williams	2002–03, 09–10, 12–13, 15
6	(United States) Martina Navratilova	1982–87
5	(United States) Chris Evert	1974–76, 80, 82
5	(West Germany) Steffi Graf	1988–89, 93, 95–96
3	(Australia) Margaret Court	1969–70, 73
2	(Socialist Federal Republic of Yugoslavia) Monica Seles	1991–92
2	(United States) **Venus Williams**	2000–01
2	(Belgium) Justine Henin	2003, 07
1	(Australia) Evonne Goolagong Cawley	1971
1	(United States) Billie Jean King	1972
1	(Spain) Arantxa Sánchez Vicario	1994
1	(Switzerland) Martina Hingis	1997
1	(United States) Jennifer Capriati	2001
1	(France) Amélie Mauresmo	2006
1	(Germany) Angelique Kerber	2016
1	(Poland) **Iga Świątek**	2022
1	**Aryna Sabalenka**	2024
1	(Kazakhstan) **Elena Rybakina**	2026

#	All 4 finals	Year
3	(United States) Martina Navratilova	1985, 86*, 87
3	(West Germany) Steffi Graf	1988–89, 93
1	(Australia) Margaret Court	1970
1	(United States) Chris Evert	1984
1	(Socialist Federal Republic of Yugoslavia) Monica Seles	1992
1	(Switzerland) Martina Hingis	1997
1	(Belgium) Justine Henin	2006
*Australian Open not played in 1986 Made all 3 available finals

#	All 4 semifinals	Year
6	(United States) Chris Evert	1974, 81–82, 84–85, 86*
4	(United States) Martina Navratilova	1984–85, 86*, 87
4	(West Germany) Steffi Graf	1988–90, 93
3	(Australia) Margaret Court	1969–70, 73
2	(Switzerland) Martina Hingis	1997–98
2	(United States) Serena Williams	2015–16
2	(Belgium) Justine Henin	2003, 06
2	**Aryna Sabalenka**	2023, 25
1	(Australia) Evonne Goolagong Cawley	1973
1	(Socialist Federal Republic of Yugoslavia) Monica Seles	1992
1	(Spain) Conchita Martínez	1995
1	(United States) Jennifer Capriati	2001
1	(Belgium) Kim Clijsters	2003
*Australian Open not played in 1986 Made all 3 available semifinals

#	All 4 quarterfinals	Year
6	(United States) Chris Evert	1974, 81–82, 84–85, 86*
5	(West Germany) Steffi Graf	1988–91, 93
5	(United States) Serena Williams	2001, 07, 09, 15–16
4	(United States) Martina Navratilova	1984–85, 86*, 87
3	(Australia) Margaret Court	1969–70, 73
3	(Argentina) Gabriela Sabatini	1991–93
3	(Switzerland) Martina Hingis	1997–98, 00
3	(United States) Lindsay Davenport	1998–99, 05
2	(Spain) Arantxa Sánchez Vicario	1991, 1998
2	(United States) **Venus Williams**	1998, 02
2	(Socialist Federal Republic of Yugoslavia) / (United States) Monica Seles	1992, 02
2	(United States) Jennifer Capriati	2001–02
2	(Belgium) Justine Henin	2003, 06
2	**Aryna Sabalenka**	2023, 25
1	(United States) Billie Jean King	1969
1	(United States) Rosemary Casals	1969
1	(United Kingdom) Virginia Wade	1972
1	(Australia) Evonne Goolagong Cawley	1973
1	(Czechoslovakia) Hana Mandlíková	1981
1	(Czechoslovakia) Helena Suková	1986*
1	(Germany) Claudia Kohde-Kilsch	1987
1	(Spain) Conchita Martínez	1995
1	(Belgium) Kim Clijsters	2003
1	(France) Amélie Mauresmo	2004
1	(Russia) Maria Sharapova	2005
1	(Poland) **Iga Świątek**	2025
*Australian Open not played in 1986 Made all 3 available quarterfinals

==== Achievements at all 4 majors by year ====
4 Slam wins *	Year
(Australia) Margaret Court	1970
(West Germany) Steffi Graf	1988
* called The Grand Slam

3 Slam wins & 1 final	Year
(West Germany) Steffi Graf	1989
(Socialist Federal Republic of Yugoslavia) Monica Seles	1992
(West Germany) Steffi Graf (2)	1993
(Switzerland) Martina Hingis	1997

2 Slam wins & 2 finals	Year
(United States) Martina Navratilova	1987

1 Slam win & 3 finals	Year
(United States) Chris Evert	1984
(Belgium) Justine Henin	2006

==== Achievements at 3 out of 4 majors by year ====
3 Slam wins	Year
(Australia) Margaret Court	1969
(United States) Billie Jean King	1972
(Australia) Margaret Court (2)	1973
(United States) Martina Navratilova	1983
(United States) Martina Navratilova (2)	1984
(West Germany) Steffi Graf	1989
(Socialist Federal Republic of Yugoslavia) Monica Seles	1991
(Socialist Federal Republic of Yugoslavia) Monica Seles (2)	1992
(West Germany) Steffi Graf (2)	1993
(West Germany) Steffi Graf (3)	1995
(West Germany) Steffi Graf (4)	1996
(Switzerland) Martina Hingis	1997
(United States) Serena Williams	2002
(United States) Serena Williams (2)	2015

2 Slam wins & 1 final	Year
(Australia) Evonne Goolagong	1971
(United States) Chris Evert	1974
(United States) Chris Evert (2)	1980
(United States) Chris Evert (3)	1982
(United States) Martina Navratilova	1982
(United States) Martina Navratilova (2)	1986
(Spain) Arantxa Sánchez Vicario	1994
(Germany) Angelique Kerber	2016

1 Slam win & 2 finals	Year
(Australia) Evonne Goolagong	1975
(Australia) Evonne Goolagong (2)	1976
(United States) Chris Evert (2)	1979
(United States) Chris Evert (3)	1985
(West Germany) Steffi Graf	1987
(West Germany) Steffi Graf (2)	1990
(Switzerland) Martina Hingis	1999
(United States) Lindsay Davenport	2000
(United States) Serena Williams	2016
**Aryna Sabalenka**	2025

3 Slam finals (all losses)	Year
(Australia) Evonne Goolagong	1972
(Spain) Arantxa Sánchez Vicario	1995
(United States) **Venus Williams**	2002

=== Consecutive ===
- spanning consecutive tournaments

#	Titles	Years
6	(Australia) Margaret Court	1969–71
6	(United States) Martina Navratilova	1983–84
5	(West Germany) Steffi Graf	1988–89
4	(West Germany) Steffi Graf (2)	1993–94
4	(United States) Serena Williams	2002–03
4	(United States) Serena Williams (2)	2014–15
3	(United States) Billie Jean King	1972
3	(United States) Martina Navratilova (2)	1981–82
3	(United States) Chris Evert	1982–83
3	(West Germany) Steffi Graf (3)	1989–90
3	(Socialist Federal Republic of Yugoslavia) Monica Seles	1991–92
3	(West Germany) Steffi Graf (4)	1995
3	(West Germany) Steffi Graf (5)	1996
3	(Switzerland) Martina Hingis	1997–98

#	Finals	Years
13	(West Germany) Steffi Graf	1987–90
11	(United States) Martina Navratilova	1985–87
6	(Australia) Margaret Court	1969–71
6	(United States) Martina Navratilova (2)	1983–84
6	(United States) Chris Evert	1984–85
6	(Socialist Federal Republic of Yugoslavia) Monica Seles	1991–93
5	(West Germany) Steffi Graf (2)	1993–94
5	(Switzerland) Martina Hingis	1997–98
4	(United States) Chris Evert (2)	1982–83
4	(Spain) Arantxa Sánchez Vicario	1994–95
4	(United States) Serena Williams	2002–03
4	(United States) Venus Williams	2002–03
4	(Belgium) Justine Henin	2006
4	(United States) Serena Williams (2)	2014–15

#	Semifinals
19	(United States) Martina Navratilova
15	(West Germany) Steffi Graf
11	(United States) Chris Evert
11	(Switzerland) Martina Hingis
10	(United States) Serena Williams
9	(Australia) Margaret Court
9	(United States) Chris Evert (2)
7	(United States) Chris Evert (3)
6	(West Germany) Steffi Graf (2)
6	(Socialist Federal Republic of Yugoslavia) / (United States) Monica Seles
6	(United States) Jennifer Capriati
6	(United States) Serena Williams (2)
6	(Belarus) **Aryna Sabalenka**

#	Quarterfinals
19	(United States) Martina Navratilova
19	(West Germany) Steffi Graf
15	(Argentina) Gabriela Sabatini
11	(United States) Chris Evert
11	(Switzerland) Martina Hingis
10	(United States) Lindsay Davenport
10	(United States) Serena Williams
9	(United States) Chris Evert (2)
9	(West Germany) Steffi Graf (2)
9	(United States) Serena Williams (2)

#	Match wins
45	(United States) Martina Navratilova
40	(West Germany) Steffi Graf
35	(Australia) Margaret Court
33	(United States) Serena Williams
33	(United States) Serena Williams (2)
32	(West Germany) Steffi Graf (2)
27	(West Germany) Steffi Graf (3)
27	(Socialist Federal Republic of Yugoslavia) / (United States) Monica Seles
26	(West Germany) Steffi Graf (4)
26	(Switzerland) Martina Hingis

#	Appearances
69	(France) Alizé Cornet
62	(Japan) Ai Sugiyama
61	(Italy) Francesca Schiavone
56	(Serbia) Jelena Janković
54	(France) Nathalie Dechy
54	(Russia) Elena Likhovtseva
52	(Switzerland) Patty Schnyder
51	(Germany) Angelique Kerber
48	(Serbia) Ana Ivanovic
48	(Russia) Anastasia Pavlyuchenkova

=== Per Grand Slam tournament ===
==== Titles per tournament ====
#	Australian Open
7	(United States) Serena Williams
4	(Australia) Margaret Court
4	(Australia) Evonne Goolagong
4	(West Germany) Steffi Graf
4	(Socialist Federal Republic of Yugoslavia) / (United States) Monica Seles
3	(United States) Martina Navratilova
3	(Switzerland) Martina Hingis
2	(United States) Chris Evert
2	(Czech Republic) Hana Mandlíková
2	(United States) Jennifer Capriati
2	(Belarus) **Victoria Azarenka**
2	(Japan) **Naomi Osaka**
2	**Aryna Sabalenka**

#	French Open
7	(United States) Chris Evert
6	(West Germany) Steffi Graf
4	(Belgium) Justine Henin
4	(Poland) **Iga Świątek**
3	(Australia) Margaret Court
3	(Socialist Federal Republic of Yugoslavia) Monica Seles
3	(Spain) Arantxa Sánchez Vicario
3	(United States) Serena Williams
2	(United States) Martina Navratilova
2	(Russia) Maria Sharapova

#	Wimbledon
9	(United States) Martina Navratilova
7	(West Germany) Steffi Graf
7	(United States) Serena Williams
5	(United States) **Venus Williams**
4	(United States) Billie Jean King
3	(United States) Chris Evert
2	(Australia) Evonne Goolagong
2	(Czech Republic) **Petra Kvitová**

#	US Open
6	(United States) Chris Evert
6	(United States) Serena Williams
5	(West Germany) Steffi Graf
4	(United States) Martina Navratilova
3	(Australia) Margaret Court
3	(United States) Billie Jean King
3	(Belgium) Kim Clijsters
2	(United States) Tracy Austin
2	(Socialist Federal Republic of Yugoslavia) Monica Seles
2	(United States) **Venus Williams**
2	(Belgium) Justine Henin
2	(Japan) **Naomi Osaka**
2	**Aryna Sabalenka**

==== Finals per tournament ====
#	Australian Open	W–L
8	(United States) Serena Williams	7–1
7	(Australia) Evonne Goolagong	4–3
6	(United States) Chris Evert	2–4
6	(Czech Republic) / (United States) Martina Navratilova	3–3
6	(Switzerland) Martina Hingis	3–3
5	(Australia) Margaret Court	4–1
5	(West Germany) Steffi Graf	4–1
4	(Socialist Federal Republic of Yugoslavia) / (United States) Monica Seles	4–0
4	**Aryna Sabalenka**	2–2
4	(Russia) Maria Sharapova	1–3
3	(Belgium) Justine Henin	1–2
3	(China) Li Na	1–2

#	French Open	W–L
9	(United States) Chris Evert	7–2
9	(West Germany) Steffi Graf	6–3
6	(Spain) Arantxa Sánchez Vicario	3–3
6	(Czech Republic) / (United States) Martina Navratilova	2–4
4	(Socialist Federal Republic of Yugoslavia) / (United States) Monica Seles	3–1
4	(Belgium) Justine Henin	4–0
4	(United States) Serena Williams	3–1
4	(Poland) **Iga Świątek**	4–0
3	(France) Mary Pierce	1–2
3	(Australia) Margaret Court	3–0
3	(Russia) Maria Sharapova	2–1
3	(Romania) Simona Halep	1–2

#	Wimbledon	W–L
12	(United States) Martina Navratilova	9–3
11	(United States) Serena Williams	7–4
10	(United States) Chris Evert	3–7
9	(West Germany) Steffi Graf	7–2
9	(United States) **Venus Williams**	5–4
6	(United States) Billie Jean King	4–2
5	(Australia) Evonne Goolagong	2–3
3	(Czech Republic) Jana Novotná	1–2
3	(United States) Lindsay Davenport	1–2

#	US Open	W–L
10	(United States) Serena Williams	6–4
9	(United States) Chris Evert	6–3
8	(United States) Martina Navratilova	4–4
8	(West Germany) Steffi Graf	5–3
4	(United States) Billie Jean King	3–1
4	(Australia) Evonne Goolagong	0–4
4	(Belgium) Kim Clijsters	3–1
4	(United States) **Venus Williams**	2–2
4	(Socialist Federal Republic of Yugoslavia) / (United States) Monica Seles	2–2
4	(Belarus) **Aryna Sabalenka**	2–2
3	(Australia) Margaret Court	3–0
3	(Belgium) Justine Henin	2–1
3	(Switzerland) Martina Hingis	1–2
3	(Czech Republic) Hana Mandlíková	1–2
3	(Belarus) **Victoria Azarenka**	0–3

==== Match wins per tournament ====
#	Australian Open
92	(United States) Serena Williams
57	(Russia) Maria Sharapova
56	(United States) Lindsay Davenport
54	(United States) **Venus Williams**
52	(Switzerland) Martina Hingis
50	(Belarus) **Victoria Azarenka**
47	(West Germany) Steffi Graf
46	(Czechoslovakia) / (United States) Martina Navratilova
43	(Socialist Federal Republic of Yugoslavia) / (United States) Monica Seles
43	(Belgium) Kim Clijsters

#	French Open
84	(West Germany) Steffi Graf
72	(United States) Chris Evert
72	(Spain) Arantxa Sánchez Vicario
69	(United States) Serena Williams
62	(Spain) Conchita Martínez
56	(Russia) Maria Sharapova
54	(Socialist Federal Republic of Yugoslavia) / (United States) Monica Seles
52	(Russia) Svetlana Kuznetsova
51	(Czechoslovakia) / (United States) Martina Navratilova
48	(United States) **Venus Williams**

#	Wimbledon
120	(Czechoslovakia) / (United States) Martina Navratilova
98	(United States) Serena Williams
96	(United States) Chris Evert
90	(United States) **Venus Williams**
74	(West Germany) Steffi Graf
65	(United States) Billie Jean King
56	(United Kingdom) Virginia Wade
50	(Czechoslovakia) Jana Novotná
49	(Australia) Evonne Goolagong Cawley
49	(United States) Lindsay Davenport

#	US Open
108	(United States) Serena Williams
101	(United States) Chris Evert
89	(Czechoslovakia) / (United States) Martina Navratilova
79	(United States) **Venus Williams**
73	(West Germany) Steffi Graf
62	(United States) Lindsay Davenport
56	(Spain) Arantxa Sánchez Vicario
53	(Socialist Federal Republic of Yugoslavia) / (United States) Monica Seles
51	(Argentina) Gabriela Sabatini
50	(Belarus) **Victoria Azarenka**

==== Match record per tournament ====
- minimum 20 wins and over 80% (correct **as of 2026 Wimbledon Championships**)

%	W–L	Australian Open
95.5	21–1	(Australia) Margaret Court
91.5	43–4	(Socialist Federal Republic of Yugoslavia) / (United States) Monica Seles
88.7	47–6	(West Germany) Steffi Graf
88.2	30–4	(United States) Chris Evert
88.1	52–7	(Switzerland) Martina Hingis
87.6	92–13	(United States) Serena Williams
86.5	45–7	(Czechoslovakia) / (United States) Martina Navratilova
82.9	34–7	(Belarus) **Aryna Sabalenka**
82.7	43–9	(Belgium) Kim Clijsters
82.6	38–8	(Belgium) Justine Henin

%	W–L	French Open
95.2	20–1	(Australia) Margaret Court
92.3	72–6	(United States) Chris Evert
91.5	43–4	(Poland) **Iga Świątek**
89.4	84–10	(West Germany) Steffi Graf
88.4	38–5	(Belgium) Justine Henin
87.1	54–8	(Socialist Federal Republic of Yugoslavia) / (United States) Monica Seles
84.7	72–13	(Spain) Arantxa Sánchez Vicario
83.1	69–14	(United States) Serena Williams
82.9	29–6	(United States) **Coco Gauff**
82.4	56–12	(Russia) Maria Sharapova

%	W–L	Wimbledon
91.4	74–7	(West Germany) Steffi Graf
89.6	120–14	(Czech Republic) / (United States) M. Navratilova
86.73	98–15	(United States) Serena Williams
86.67	65–10	(United States) Billie Jean King
86.5	96–15	(United States) Chris Evert
84.5	49–9	(Australia) E. Goolagong Cawley
84.4	27–5	(Australia) Margaret Court
84.0	21–4	(Kazakhstan) **Elena Rybakina**
82.6	90–19	(United States) **Venus Williams**
80.3	49–12	(United States) Lindsay Davenport

%	W–L	US Open
90.6	29–3	(Australia) Margaret Court
89.4	101–12	(United States) Chris Evert
89.0	73–9	(West Germany) Steffi Graf
88.6	31–4	(United States) Tracy Austin
87.8	108–15	(United States) Serena Williams
85.7	36–6	(United States) Billie Jean King
85.0	34–6	(Belarus) **Aryna Sabalenka**
84.4	38–7	(Belgium) Kim Clijsters
84.3	91–17	(Czech Republic) / (United States) Martina Navratilova
84.1	53–10	(Socialist Federal Republic of Yugoslavia) / (United States) Monica Seles

== Grand Slam tournament miscellaneous ==
=== Grand Slam tournament season streaks ===
#	3+ titles per season	Years
2	(Australia) Margaret Court	1969–1970
2	(United States) Martina Navratilova	1983–1984
2	(West Germany) Steffi Graf	1988–1989
2	(Socialist Federal Republic of Yugoslavia) Monica Seles	1991–1992
2	(West Germany) Steffi Graf (2)	1995–1996

#	2+ titles per season	Years
6	(United States) Martina Navratilova	1982–1987
3	(United States) Chris Evert	1974–1976
2	(Australia) Margaret Court	1969–1970
2	(West Germany) Steffi Graf	1988–1989
2	(Socialist Federal Republic of Yugoslavia) Monica Seles	1991–1992
2	(West Germany) Steffi Graf (2)	1995–1996
2	(United States) **Venus Williams**	2000–2001
2	(United States) Serena Williams	2002–2003
2	(United States) Serena Williams (2)	2009–2010
2	(United States) Serena Williams (3)	2012–2013

#	1+ title per season	Years
13	(United States) Chris Evert	1974–1986
10	(West Germany) Steffi Graf	1987–1996
7	(United States) Martina Navratilova	1981–1987
6	(United States) Serena Williams	2012–2017
5	(United States) Billie Jean King	1971–1975
5	(Belgium) Justine Henin	2003–2007
4	(Australia) Evonne Goolagong	1974–1977
4	(Socialist Federal Republic of Yugoslavia) Monica Seles	1990–1993
4	(United States) Serena Williams (2)	2007–2010
4	(Japan) **Naomi Osaka**	2018–2021
4	(Poland) **Iga Świątek**^{▲}	**2022–2025**

#	1+ final per season	Years
14	(United States) Chris Evert	1973–1986
13	(United States) Serena Williams	2007–2019
11	(United States) Martina Navratilova	1981–1991
10	(West Germany) Steffi Graf	1987–1996
8	(United States) Billie Jean King	1968–1975
7	(Australia) Evonne Goolagong	1971–1977
6	(Switzerland) Martina Hingis	1997–2002
5	(United States) Serena Williams (2)	2001–2005
5	(Belgium) Justine Henin	2003–2007
5	(Russia) Maria Sharapova	2011–2015

=== Grand Slam tournaments won without losing a set ===
#	Player	Majors
6	(United States) Martina Navratilova	1983 WM, 1983 US, 1984 WM, 1986 WM, 1987 US, 1990 WM
6	(United States) Serena Williams	2002 WM, 2002 US, 2008 US, 2010 WM, 2014 US, 2017 AU
5	(United States) Chris Evert	1974 FR, 1976 US, 1977 US, 1978 US, 1981 WM
5	(West Germany) Steffi Graf	1988 AU, 1988 FR, 1989 AU, 1994 AU, 1996 US
4	(Australia) Evonne Goolagong	1971 FR, 1975 AU, 1976 AU, 1977 AU (Dec)
3	(Australia) Margaret Court	1969 US, 1970 AU, 1973 AU
3	(United States) Billie Jean King	1971 US, 1972 FR, 1972 US
3	(United States) Lindsay Davenport	1998 US, 1999 WM, 2000 AU
3	(Belgium) Justine Henin	2006 FR, 2007 FR, 2007 US
2	(Switzerland) Martina Hingis	1997 AU, 1997 US
2	(United States) **Venus Williams**	2001 US, 2008 WM
1	(Australia) Chris O'Neil	1978 AU
1	(Socialist Federal Republic of Yugoslavia) Monica Seles	1992 US
1	(Russia) Maria Sharapova	2008 AU
1	(France) Marion Bartoli	2013 WM
1	(Poland) **Iga Świątek**	2020 FR
1	(United Kingdom) **Emma Raducanu**	2021 US
1	(Australia) Ashleigh Barty	2022 AU
1	(Belarus) **Aryna Sabalenka**	2024 AU

=== Youngest and oldest at the majors ===
==== Winning first and last titles ====
Age of first title		Event
16 years, 118 days	(Switzerland) Martina Hingis	1997 Australian Open
16 years, 190 days	(Socialist Federal Republic of Yugoslavia) Monica Seles	1990 French Open
16 years, 271 days	(United States) Tracy Austin	1979 US Open
17 years, 76 days	(Russia) Maria Sharapova	2004 Wimbledon
17 years, 175 days	(Spain) Arantxa Sánchez Vicario	1989 French Open

Age of last title		Event
35 years, 125 days	(United States) Serena Williams	2017 Australian Open
33 years, 262 days	(United States) Martina Navratilova	1990 Wimbledon
33 years, 199 days	(Italy) Flavia Pennetta	2015 US Open
31 years, 357 days	(United Kingdom) Virginia Wade	1977 Wimbledon
31 years, 334 days	(China) Li Na	2014 Australian Open

==== Winning a title ====
Youngest winners		Event
16 years, 117 days	(Switzerland) Martina Hingis	1997 Australian Open
16 years, 189 days	(Socialist Federal Republic of Yugoslavia) Monica Seles	1990 French Open
16 years, 270 days	(United States) Tracy Austin	1979 US Open
16 years, 278 days	(Switzerland) Martina Hingis (2)	1997 Wimbledon
16 years, 341 days	(Switzerland) Martina Hingis (3)	1997 US Open
17 years, 55 days	(Socialist Federal Republic of Yugoslavia) Monica Seles (2)	1991 Australian Open
17 years, 76 days	Maria Sharapova	2004 Wimbledon
17 years, 124 days	(Switzerland) Martina Hingis (4)	1998 Australian Open
17 years, 175 days	(Spain) Arantxa Sánchez Vicario	1989 French Open
17 years, 189 days	(Socialist Federal Republic of Yugoslavia) Monica Seles (3)	1991 French Open

Oldest winners		Event
35 years, 124 days	(United States) Serena Williams	2017 Australian Open
34 years, 287 days	(United States) Serena Williams (2)	2016 Wimbledon
33 years, 288 days	(United States) Serena Williams (3)	2015 Wimbledon
33 years, 262 days	(United States) Martina Navratilova	1990 Wimbledon
33 years, 253 days	(United States) Serena Williams (4)	2015 French Open
33 years, 199 days	(Italy) Flavia Pennetta	2015 US Open
33 years, 127 days	(United States) Serena Williams (5)	2015 Australian Open
32 years, 346 days	(United States) Serena Williams (6)	2014 US Open
31 years, 357 days	(United Kingdom) Virginia Wade	1977 Wimbledon
31 years, 347 days	(United States) Serena Williams (7)	2013 US Open

==== Reaching a final ====
Youngest finalists		Event
16 years, 68 days	(United States) Pam Shriver	1978 US Open
16 years, 118 days	(Switzerland) Martina Hingis	1997 Australian Open
16 years, 190 days	(Socialist Federal Republic of Yugoslavia) Monica Seles	1990 French Open
16 years, 251 days	(Switzerland) Martina Hingis (2)	1997 French Open
16 years, 271 days	(United States) Tracy Austin	1979 US Open
16 years, 279 days	(Switzerland) Martina Hingis (3)	1997 Wimbledon
16 years, 342 days	(Switzerland) Martina Hingis (4)	1997 US Open
17 years, 2 days	(United States) Andrea Jaeger	1982 French Open
17 years, 50 days	(Soviet Union) Natasha Zvereva	1988 French Open
17 years, 56 days	(Socialist Federal Republic of Yugoslavia) Monica Seles (2)	1991 Australian Open

Oldest finalists		Event
37 years, 347 days	(United States) Serena Williams	2019 US Open
37 years, 291 days	(United States) Serena Williams (2)	2019 Wimbledon
37 years, 258 days	(United States) Martina Navratilova	1994 Wimbledon
37 years, 30 days	(United States) **Venus Williams**	2017 Wimbledon
36 years, 348 days	(United States) Serena Williams (3)	2018 US Open
36 years, 292 days	(United States) Serena Williams (4)	2018 Wimbledon
36 years, 226 days	(United States) **Venus Williams (2)**	2017 Australian Open
35 years, 125 days	(United States) Serena Williams (5)	2017 Australian Open
34 years, 325 days	(United States) Martina Navratilova (2)	1991 US Open
34 years, 288 days	(United States) Serena Williams (6)	2016 Wimbledon

=== Grand Slam tournament titles by decade ===
- minimum 2 titles

1960s

3	Margaret Court

Court claimed both US National titles played in 1968 & 1969 alongside the US Open, but these tournaments were subsequently downgraded to non-Grand Slam status.

1970s

9	Chris Evert

8	Margaret Court

7	Billie Jean King

6	Evonne Goolagong

2	Martina Navratilova, Virginia Wade

1980s

15	Martina Navratilova

9	Chris Evert

8	Steffi Graf

4	Hana Mandlíková

1990s

14	Steffi Graf

9	Monica Seles

5	Martina Hingis

3	Arantxa Sánchez Vicario

2	Lindsay Davenport

2000s

10	Serena Williams

7	Justine Henin, Venus Williams

3	Jennifer Capriati, Maria Sharapova

2	Amélie Mauresmo, Svetlana Kuznetsova, Kim Clijsters

2010s

12	Serena Williams

3	Angelique Kerber

2	Kim Clijsters, **Victoria Azarenka**, Li Na, Maria Sharapova, Petra Kvitová, Garbiñe Muguruza, **Naomi Osaka**, Simona Halep

2020s

6	**Iga Świątek**

4	**Aryna Sabalenka**

3	**Elena Rybakina**

2	**Naomi Osaka**, Ashleigh Barty, **Barbora Krejčíková**, **Coco Gauff**

== All tournaments ==
=== Titles and finals ===
#	Titles
167	(Czech Republic) / (United States) Martina Navratilova
157	(United States) Chris Evert
107	(West Germany) Steffi Graf
92	(Australia) Margaret Court
73	(United States) Serena Williams
68	(Australia) Evonne Goolagong
67	(United States) Billie Jean King
55	(United Kingdom) Virginia Wade
55	(United States) Lindsay Davenport
53	(Socialist Federal Republic of Yugoslavia) / (United States) Monica Seles

#	Finals	Record
239	(Czech Republic) / (United States) Martina Navratilova	167–72
230	(United States) Chris Evert	157–73
138	(West Germany) Steffi Graf	107–31
122	(United States) Billie Jean King	67–55
121	(Australia) Margaret Court	92–29
119	(Australia) Evonne Goolagong	68–51
98	(United States) Serena Williams	73–25
93	(United States) Lindsay Davenport	55–38
85	(Socialist Federal Republic of Yugoslavia) / (United States) Monica Seles	53–32
83	(United States) Venus Williams	49–34

=== Matches ===
#	Played
1661	(Czech Republic) / (United States) Martina Navratilova
1455	(United States) Chris Evert
1321	(Germany) **Tatjana Maria**
1282	(United States) **Varvara Lepchenko**
1239	(Netherlands) **Arantxa Rus**
1224	(Bulgaria) Dia Evtimova
1206	(Italy) Sara Errani
1168	(United Kingdom) Virginia Wade
1165	(Georgia (country)) **Sofia Shapatava**
1130	(Germany) **Madison Brengle**

#	Won
1442	(Czech Republic) / (United States) Martina Navratilova
1309	(United States) Chris Evert
900	(Germany) Steffi Graf
858	(United States) Serena Williams
839	(United Kingdom) Virginia Wade
819	(United States) Venus Williams
759	(Spain) Arantxa Sánchez
753	(Netherlands) **Arantxa Rus**
753	(United States) Lindsay Davenport
739	(Spain) Conchita Martínez

#	Played (active)
1321	(Germany) Tatjana Maria
1282	(United States) Varvara Lepchenko
1239	(Netherlands) Arantxa Rus
1165	(Georgia (country)) Sofia Shapatava
1130	(Germany) Madison Brengle
1086	(China) Zhang Shuai
1080	(Australia) Arina Rodionova
1080	(Georgia (country)) Ekaterine Gorgodze
1076	(Turkey) Çağla Büyükakçay
1077	(Japan) Erika Sema

#	Won (active)
753	(Netherlands) Arantxa Rus
732	(Germany) Tatjana Maria
726	(United States) Varvara Lepchenko
663	(Czech Republic) Karolína Plíšková
649	(Germany) Madison Brengle
642	(Bulgaria) Dia Evtimova
640	Victoria Azarenka
634	(Czech Republic) Petra Kvitova
619	(China) Zhang Shuai
618	(Georgia (country)) Ekaterine Gorgodze

#	Consecutive match wins	Years
74	(United States) Martina Navratilova	1984
66	(West Germany) Steffi Graf	1989–90
58	(United States) Martina Navratilova	1986–87
57	(Australia) Margaret Court	1972–73
56	(United States) Chris Evert	1974
54	(United States) Martina Navratilova	1983–84
46	(West Germany) Steffi Graf	1988
45	(West Germany) Steffi Graf	1987
42	(United States) Chris Evert	1975–76
41	(United States) Martina Navratilova	1982
39	(United States) Martina Navratilova	1982–83
37	(Poland) Iga Świątek	2022

== Most titles / finals at a single tournament ==
Titles
#	Player	Tournament	Years
12	(United States) Martina Navratilova	Chicago	1978–83, 86–88, 90–92
11	(United States) Martina Navratilova (2)	Eastbourne	1978, 82–86, 88–91, 93
9	(Czech Republic) / (United States) Martina Navratilova (3)	Washington	1975, 77–78, 82–83, 85–86, 88, 90
9	(United States) Martina Navratilova (4)	**Wimbledon**	1978–79, 82–87, 90
9	(United States) Martina Navratilova (5)	Dallas	1979–83, 85–87, 90
9	(Germany) Steffi Graf	German Open	1986–89, 91–94, 96
8	(United States) Chris Evert	Family Circle	1974–78, 81, 84–85
8	(United States) Martina Navratilova (6)	WTA Tour Finals	1978–79, 81, 83–86 (Mar), 86 (Nov)
8	(United States) Martina Navratilova (7)	Los Angeles	1978, 80–81, 83, 86, 89, 92–93
8	(United States) Serena Williams	Miami Open	2002–04, 07–08, 13–15
7	(Czech Republic) / (United States) Martina Navratilova (8)	Orlando	1974, 80–85
7	(United States) Chris Evert (2)	**French Open**	1974–75, 79–80, 83, 85–86
7	(Germany) Steffi Graf (2)	**Wimbledon**	1988–89, 91–93, 95–96
7	(United States) Serena Williams (2)	**Wimbledon**	2002–03, 09–10, 12, 15–16
7	(United States) Serena Williams (3)	**Australian Open**	2003, 05, 07, 09–10, 15, 17
6	(United States) Chris Evert (3)	U.S. Clay Court Championships	1972–75, 79–80
6	(United States) Chris Evert (4)	**US Open**	1975–78, 80, 82
6	(United States) Martina Navratilova (9)	Houston	1976–79, 83, 85
6	(United States) Chris Evert (5)	Eckerd Open, Tampa Bay Area	1971, 73–74, 82, 87–88
6	(Germany) Steffi Graf (3)	Hamburg	1987–92
6	(United States) Martina Navratilova (10)	Filderstadt & Stuttgart	1982–83, 86–88, 92
6	(Germany) Steffi Graf (4)	Zurich	1986–87, 89–92
6	(Germany) Steffi Graf (5)	Brighton	1986, 88–92
6	(Germany) Steffi Graf (6)	Virginia Slims of Florida	1987, 89, 92–95
6	(Germany) Steffi Graf (7)	**French Open**	1987–88, 93, 95–96, 99
6	(United States) Serena Williams (4)	**US Open**	1999, 2002, 08, 12–14
6	(Spain) Arantxa Sánchez Vicario	Spanish Open	1989–90, 93–95, 2001

Finals
#	Player	Tournament	Years
14	(Czech Republic) / (United States) Martina Navratilova	WTA Tour Finals	1975, 78–86 (Mar), 86 (Nov), 89, 91–92
14	(Czech Republic) / (United States) Martina Navratilova	Chicago	1975, 78–83, 86–88, 90–93
13	(United States) Martina Navratilova	Eastbourne	1978–79, 82–87, 88–91, 93
12	(United States) Martina Navratilova	**Wimbledon**	1978–79, 82–90, 94
11	(Czech Republic) / (United States) Martina Navratilova	Not WASHINGTON ANYMORE	1975, 77–80, 82–83, 85–86, 88, 90
11	(Czech Republic) / (United States) Martina Navratilova	Dallas	1975–76, 79–83, 85–87, 90
11	(United States) Martina Navratilova	Los Angeles	1977–81, 83, 86, 89–90, 92–93
11	(Germany) Steffi Graf	German Open	1985–89, 90–94, 96
11	(United States) Serena Williams	**Wimbledon**	2002–04, 08–10, 12, 15–16, 18–19
10	(United States) Chris Evert	**Wimbledon**	1973–74, 76, 78–82, 84–85
10	(United States) Serena Williams	Miami Open	1999, 2002–04, 07–09, 13–15
10	(United States) Serena Williams	**US Open**	1999, 2001–02, 08, 11–14, 18–19
9	(United States) Chris Evert	**US Open**	1975–80, 82–84
9	(United States) Chris Evert	Family Circle	1974–78, 81, 84–86
9	(United States) Chris Evert	**French Open**	1973–75, 79–80, 83–86
9	(United States) Martina Navratilova	Houston	1976–80, 83, 85, 87–88
9	(United States) Martina Navratilova	Stuttgart	1979, 81–83, 86–88, 91–92
9	(United States) Martina Navratilova	West Classic	1979–80, 84, 88, 90–94
9	(Germany) Steffi Graf	Florida	1986–89, 91–95
9	(Germany) Steffi Graf	**French Open**	1987–90, 92–93, 95–96, 99
9	(Germany) Steffi Graf	**Wimbledon**	1987–89, 91–93, 95–96, 99
9	(United States) **Venus Williams**	**Wimbledon**	2000–03, 05, 07–09, 17

=== Career match streaks ===
Years	Wins	Matches won
1984	74	(United States) Martina Navratilova
1989–90	66	(West Germany) Steffi Graf
1986–87	58	(United States) Martina Navratilova (2)
1972–73	57	(Australia) Margaret Court
1974	56	(United States) Chris Evert
1983–84	54	(United States) Martina Navratilova (3)
1988	46	(West Germany) Steffi Graf (2)
1987	45	(West Germany) Steffi Graf (3)
1975–76	42	(United States) Chris Evert (2)
1982	41	(United States) Martina Navratilova (4)
2022	37	(Poland) Iga Świątek

=== Titles by court type ===
#	Hard
48	(United States) Serena Williams
37	(West Germany) Steffi Graf
35	(United States) Chris Evert
33	(United States) Lindsay Davenport
33	(United States) **Venus Williams**
31	(Belgium) Kim Clijsters
29	(Czech Republic) / (United States) Martina Navratilova
29	(Socialist Federal Republic of Yugoslavia) / (United States) Monica Seles
24	(Denmark) Caroline Wozniacki
21	(Belarus) **Aryna Sabalenka**

#	Clay
70	(United States) Chris Evert
32	(West Germany) Steffi Graf
22	(Australia) Margaret Court
20	(Australia) Evonne Goolagong
19	(Spain) Arantxa Sánchez
19	(Spain) Conchita Martínez
18	(Czech Republic) / (United States) Martina Navratilova
14	(Socialist Federal Republic of Yugoslavia) / (United States) Monica Seles
13	(Belgium) Justine Henin
13	(United States) Serena Williams

#	Grass
46	(Australia) Margaret Court
38	(Australia) Evonne Goolagong
32	(Czech Republic) / (United States) Martina Navratilova
22	(United States) Billie Jean King
17	(United States) Chris Evert
10	(United Kingdom) Sue Barker
8	(United Kingdom) Ann Jones
8	(United Kingdom) Virginia Wade
8	(United States) Serena Williams
7	(West Germany) Steffi Graf

#	Carpet
88	(Czech Republic) / (United States) Martina Navratilova
36	(United States) Billie Jean King
35	(United States) Chris Evert
31	(Germany) Steffi Graf
26	(United Kingdom) Virginia Wade
19	(Australia) Margaret Court
16	(Switzerland) Martina Hingis
15	(Australia) Evonne Goolagong
14	(United States) Tracy Austin
12	(United States) Lindsay Davenport

#	Outdoor
122	(United States) Chris Evert
83	(Australia) Margaret Court
79	(Czech Republic) / (United States) Martina Navratilova
77	(West Germany) Steffi Graf
71	(Australia) Evonne Goolagong
64	(United States) Serena Williams
47	(United States) Bille Jean King
43	(United States) Lindsay Davenport
43	(Socialist Federal Republic of Yugoslavia) / (United States) Monica Seles
39	(United States) **Venus Williams**

#	Indoor
88	(Czech Republic) / (United States) Martina Navratilova
36	(United States) Billie Jean King
35	(United States) Chris Evert
30	(Germany) Steffi Graf
28	(United Kingdom) Virginia Wade
19	(Australia) Margaret Court
16	(Switzerland) Martina Hingis
15	(Australia) Evonne Goolagong
14	(United States) Tracy Austin
13	(United States) Lindsay Davenport

=== Match wins by court type ===
#	Hard
541	(United States) Serena Williams
501	(United States) **Venus Williams**
468	(United States) Lindsay Davenport
446	(Denmark) **Caroline Wozniacki**
400	(Belarus) **Victoria Azarenka**
400	(Serbia) Jelena Janković
385	(Poland) Agnieszka Radwańska
384	(Russia) Svetlana Kuznetsova
372	**Aryna Sabalenka**
363	(Russia) Maria Sharapova

#	Clay
413	(United States) Chris Evert
342	(Spain) Arantxa Sánchez
294	(Spain) Conchita Martínez
273	(Germany) Steffi Graf
242	(Italy) Sandra Cecchini
222	(Switzerland) Patty Schnyder
220	(Czech Republic) / (United States) Martina Navratilova
207	(Australia) Evonne Goolagong
196	(Argentina) Gabriela Sabatini
179	(United States) Serena Williams

#	Grass
309	(Czech Republic) / (United States) Martina Navratilova
285	(Australia) Evonne Goolagong
264	(Australia) Margaret Court
212	(United Kingdom) Virginia Wade
208	(United States) Chris Evert
190	(United States) Billie Jean King
189	(United States) Pam Shriver
169	(Australia) Wendy Turnbull
134	(United States) Rosemary Casals
125	(Czech Republic) Helena Suková

#	Carpet
600	(Czech Republic) / (United States) Martina Navratilova
314	(United States) Chris Evert
251	(United Kingdom) Virginia Wade
221	(United States) Pam Shriver
235	(United States) Rosemary Casals
209	(Australia) Wendy Turnbull
190	(United States) Billie Jean King
190	(Germany) Steffi Graf
182	(Czech Republic) Helena Suková
175	(United States) Zina Garrison

#	Outdoor
900	(United States) Chris Evert
796	(Czech Republic) / (United States) Martina Navratilova
782	(United States) Serena Williams
709	(United States) **Venus Williams**
693	(Germany) Steffi Graf
687	(Spain) Arantxa Sánchez
614	(Spain) Conchita Martínez
608	(United States) Lindsay Davenport
559	(Russia) Svetlana Kuznetsova
527	(Australia) Evonne Goolagong

#	Indoor
624	(Czech Republic) / (United States) Martina Navratilova
329	(United States) Chris Evert
294	(United Kingdom) Virginia Wade
258	(United States) Billie Jean King
235	(United States) Rosemary Casals
229	(United States) Pam Shriver
217	(Australia) Wendy Turnbull
201	(Germany) Steffi Graf
195	(United States) Zina Garrison
187	(Czech Republic) Helena Suková

=== Match record by court type ===
- active players are denoted in boldface

%	W–L	All surfaces
90.75	569–58	(Australia) Margaret Court
89.71	1229–141	(United States) Chris Evert
88.69	902–115	(Germany) Steffi Graf
87.06	1420–211	(Czech Republic) / (United States) Martina Navratilova
84.62	858–156	(United States) Serena Williams
82.98	595–122	(Socialist Federal Republic of Yugoslavia) / (United States) Monica Seles
82.80	679–141	(Australia) Evonne Goolagong
82.40	660–141	(United States) Billie Jean King
82.03	525–115	(Belgium) Justine Henin
79.97	523–131	(Belgium) Kim Clijsters
* Minimum 500 wins

%	W–L	Clay
94.51	413–24	(United States) Chris Evert
90.54	287–30	(West Germany) Steffi Graf
85.79	157–26	(Poland) **Iga Swiatek**
85.03	142–25	(Socialist Federal Republic of Yugoslavia) / (United States) Monica Seles
83.55	127–25	(Belgium) Justine Henin
82.49	179–38	(United States) Serena Williams
82.38	159–34	(Russia) Maria Sharapova
80.29	220–54	(Czech Republic) / (United States) Martina Navratilova
81.34	109–25	(Switzerland) Martina Hingis
80.00	196–49	(Argentina) Gabriela Sabatini
* Minimum 100 wins

%	W–L	Hard
90.43	340–36	(West Germany) Steffi Graf
89.91	294–33	(United States) Chris Evert
87.13	291–43	(Czech Republic) / (United States) Martina Navratilova
85.06	541–95	(United States) Serena Williams
83.87	312–60	(Socialist Federal Republic of Yugoslavia) / (United States) Monica Seles
81.40	315–72	(Belgium) Kim Clijsters
81.29	252–58	(Belgium) Justine Henin
80.69	468–112	(United States) Lindsay Davenport
79.67	290–74	(Switzerland) Martina Hingis
78.62	386–105	(Russia) Maria Sharapova
* Minimum 200 wins

%	W–L	Grass
92.63	264–21	(Australia) Margaret Court
88.54	309–40	(Czech Republic) / (United States) Martina Navratilova
87.39	208–30	(United States) Chris Evert
86.99	107–16	(United States) Serena Williams
85.59	190–32	(United States) Billie Jean King
85.00	85–15	(West Germany) Steffi Graf
81.19	82–19	(Russia) Maria Sharapova
79.67	98–25	(United States) **Venus Williams**
79.10	53–14	(United States) Tracy Austin
78.95	75–20	(Czech Republic) Jana Novotná
* Minimum 40 wins

%	W–L	Carpet
89.15	189–23	(West Germany) Steffi Graf
89.02	600–74	(Czech Republic) / (United States) Martina Navratilova
87.25	89–13	(Australia) Margaret Court
85.33	314–54	(United States) Chris Evert
80.51	95–23	(Switzerland) Martina Hingis
80.11	149–37	(United States) Tracy Austin
79.73	232–59	(United States) Billie Jean King
79.34	96–25	(United States) Lindsay Davenport
79.51	97–25	(Socialist Federal Republic of Yugoslavia) / (United States) Monica Seles
77.05	47–14	(Belgium) Kim Clijsters
* Minimum + 40 wins

=== Single season records ===
#	Titles	Year
21	(Australia) Margaret Court	1970
18	(Australia) Margaret Court (2)	1969
18	(United States) Billie Jean King	1971
16	(Australia) Margaret Court (3)	1973
16	(United States) Chris Evert	1974
16	(United States) Chris Evert (2)	1975
16	(United States) Martina Navratilova	1983
15	(United States) Martina Navratilova (2)	1982
14	(United States) Martina Navratilova (3)	1986
14	(West Germany) Steffi Graf	1989
14	(Australia) Margaret Court (4)	1968

%	W–L	Match record	Year
98.85	86–1	(United States) Martina Navratilova	1983
97.73	86–2	(West Germany) Steffi Graf	1989
97.50	78–2	(United States) Martina Navratilova (2)	1984
97.40	75–2	(West Germany) Steffi Graf (2)	1987
96.77	90–3	(United States) Martina Navratilova (3)	1982
96.77	90–3	(United States) Martina Navratilova (4)	1986
96.00	72–3	(West Germany) Steffi Graf (3)	1988
95.92	47–2	(West Germany) Steffi Graf (4)	1995
95.73	112–5	(Australia) Margaret Court	1970
95.15	98–5	(Australia) Margaret Court (2)	1969
* minimum 40 wins

== Year-end Championships ==
- **(1972 – present)**

#	Titles	Years
8	(United States) Martina Navratilova	1978, 1979, 1981, 1983, 1984, 1985, 1986 (x2)
5	(Germany) Steffi Graf	1987, 1989, 1993, 1995, 1996
5	(United States) Serena Williams	2001, 2009, 2012, 2013, 2014
4	(United States) Chris Evert	1972, 1973, 1975, 1977
3	(Socialist Federal Republic of Yugoslavia) Monica Seles	1990, 1991, 1992
3	(Belgium) Kim Clijsters	2002, 2003, 2010

#	Finals
14	(United States) Martina Navratilova
8	(United States) Chris Evert
7	(United States) Serena Williams
6	(Germany) Steffi Graf
4	(Argentina) Gabriela Sabatini
4	(Socialist Federal Republic of Yugoslavia) / (United States) Monica Seles
4	(Switzerland) Martina Hingis
4	(United States) Lindsay Davenport

#	Semifinals
16	(United States) Martina Navratilova
9	(United States) Chris Evert
9	(Germany) Steffi Graf
7	(Argentina) Gabriela Sabatini
7	(United States) Serena Williams

#	Appearances
21	(United States) Martina Navratilova
13	(United States) Chris Evert
13	(Germany) Steffi Graf
13	(Spain) Arantxa Sánchez
12	(United States) Zina Garrison
12	(Spain) Conchita Martínez

#	Match Won
60	(United States) Martina Navratilova
34	(United States) Chris Evert
31	(Germany) Steffi Graf
29	(United States) Serena Williams
21	(Argentina) Gabriela Sabatini

#	Match Played
74	(United States) Martina Navratilova
43	(United States) Chris Evert
38	(Germany) Steffi Graf
35	(United States) Serena Williams
30	(Argentina) Gabriela Sabatini

% *	W–L	Win %
82.86	29–6	(United States) Serena Williams
81.58	31–7	(Germany) Steffi Graf
81.08	60–14	(United States) Martina Navratilova
79.07	34–9	(United States) Chris Evert
75.00	18–6	(Socialist Federal Republic of Yugoslavia) / (United States) Monica Seles
* Minimum 18 Wins

#	Not losing a set	Years
2	(United States) Martina Navratilova	1984, 1985
2	(United States) Serena Williams	2001, 2012
1	(Argentina) Gabriela Sabatini	1988
1	(Belgium) Kim Clijsters	2002
1	(Poland) **Iga Świątek**	2023

== WTA Premier/Tier One (since inception in 1988) ==
- Overall totals include premier mandatory, premier five and tier one tournaments only.
- Tier one tournaments were played on 3 surfaces (carpet ceased as a surface in 1995).

#	Titles
23	(United States) Serena Williams
18	(West Germany) Steffi Graf
17	(Switzerland) Martina Hingis
14	(Russia) Maria Sharapova
12	(Poland) **Iga Świątek**
11	(United States) Lindsay Davenport
11	(Belarus) **Aryna Sabalenka**
10	(Belgium) Justine Henin
10	(Belarus) **Victoria Azarenka**
9	(Spain) Conchita Martínez
9	(Socialist Federal Republic of Yugoslavia) / (United States) Monica Seles
9	(United States) **Venus Williams**
9	(Romania) Simona Halep
9	(Czech Republic) Petra Kvitová

#	Finals
33	(United States) Serena Williams
27	(Switzerland) Martina Hingis
25	(West Germany) Steffi Graf
25	(Russia) Maria Sharapova
21	(United States) Lindsay Davenport
18	(Socialist Federal Republic of Yugoslavia) / (United States) Monica Seles
18	(Romania) Simona Halep
15	(United States) **Venus Williams**
15	(Belarus) **Victoria Azarenka**
15	(Belarus) **Aryna Sabalenka**

#	Matches won
265	(United States) Serena Williams
231	(Belarus) **Victoria Azarenka**
220	(Russia) Maria Sharapova
214	(Russia) Svetlana Kuznetsova
214	(United States) **Venus Williams**
196	(Poland) Agnieszka Radwańska
189	(Switzerland) Martina Hingis
189	(Denmark) **Caroline Wozniacki**
186	(Romania) Simona Halep
181	(Czech Republic) Petra Kvitová

#	Matches played
337	(Russia) Svetlana Kuznetsova
325	(Belarus) **Victoria Azarenka**
316	(United States) Serena Williams
307	(United States) **Venus Williams**
290	(Serbia) Jelena Janković
289	(Russia) Maria Sharapova
285	(Denmark) **Caroline Wozniacki**
282	(Poland) Agnieszka Radwańska
279	(Czech Republic) Petra Kvitová
259	(Romania) Simona Halep
225	(Germany) **Angelique Kerber**

%	W–L *	Win %
89.63	147–17	(West Germany) Steffi Graf
83.86	265–51	(United States) Serena Williams
81.12	189–44	(Switzerland) Martina Hingis
80.88	110–26	(Belgium) Justine Henin
80.13	121–30	(Socialist Federal Republic of Yugoslavia) / (United States) Monica Seles
80.11	145–36	(Poland) **Iga Świątek**
78.35	152–42	(United States) Lindsay Davenport
76.12	220–69	(Russia) Maria Sharapova
74.52	155–53	(Belarus) **Aryna Sabalenka**
71.81	186–73	(Romania) Simona Halep
71.79	112–44	(Kazakhstan) **Elena Rybakina**
71.08	231–94	(Belarus) **Victoria Azarenka**
* minimum 100 wins

=== Titles by court type ===
#	Hard
16	(United States) Serena Williams
10	(Belarus) **Victoria Azarenka**
9	(Russia) Maria Sharapova
8	(West Germany) Steffi Graf
8	(Belarus) **Aryna Sabalenka**
8	(Poland) **Iga Świątek**
7	(United States) **Venus Williams**
6	(Socialist Federal Republic of Yugoslavia) / (United States) Monica Seles
6	(Belgium) Kim Clijsters
6	(Denmark) **Caroline Wozniacki**
6	(Romania) Simona Halep
6	(Czech Republic) Petra Kvitová

#	Clay
8	(West Germany) Steffi Graf
8	(Spain) Conchita Martínez
7	(United States) Serena Williams
5	(Switzerland) Martina Hingis
5	(Belgium) Justine Henin
5	(Russia) Maria Sharapova
4	(France) Amélie Mauresmo
4	(Argentina) Gabriela Sabatini
4	(Poland) **Iga Świątek**
3	(Socialist Federal Republic of Yugoslavia) Monica Seles
3	(Russia) Dinara Safina
3	(Czech Republic) Petra Kvitová
3	(Serbia) Jelena Janković
3	(Romania) Simona Halep
3	(Belarus) **Aryna Sabalenka**

== Olympic tournaments ==
Tennis was reinstated as an official Olympic sport in 1988. There have been nine tournaments in the Open Era.

== WTA rankings achievements ==
WTA rankings began in 1975. These weekly rankings determine tournament eligibility and seedings. At the end of each year they also become the official WTA season rankings.

Correct as of 7 September 2026 with (▲) indicating active streaks..

#	Weeks at No. 1
377	(Germany) Steffi Graf
332	(United States) Martina Navratilova
319	(United States) Serena Williams
260	(United States) Chris Evert
209	(Switzerland) Martina Hingis
178	(Socialist Federal Republic of Yugoslavia) / (United States) Monica Seles
125	(Poland) **Iga Świątek**
121	(Australia) Ashleigh Barty
117	(Belgium) Justine Henin
**106**	**Aryna Sabalenka**▲

#	Consecutive weeks at No. 1
186	(Germany) Steffi Graf
186	(United States) Serena Williams
156	(United States) Martina Navratilova
114	(Australia) Ashleigh Barty
113	(United States) Chris Evert
**98**	**Aryna Sabalenka**▲
94	(Germany) Steffi Graf (2)
91	(Socialist Federal Republic of Yugoslavia) Monica Seles
90	(United States) Martina Navratilova (2)
87	(Germany) Steffi Graf (3)

#	Year-end No. 1
8	(Germany) Steffi Graf
7	(United States) Martina Navratilova
5	(United States) Chris Evert
5	(United States) Serena Williams
4	(United States) Lindsay Davenport
3	(Belgium) Justine Henin
3	(Switzerland) Martina Hingis
3	(Socialist Federal Republic of Yugoslavia) / (United States) Monica Seles
3	(Australia) Ashleigh Barty
2	(Denmark) Caroline Wozniacki
2	(Romania) Simona Halep
2	(Poland) Iga Świątek
2	Aryna Sabalenka

#	Consecutive Year-end No. 1
5	(United States) Martina Navratilova
4	(Germany) Steffi Graf
4	(Germany) Steffi Graf (2)
3	(United States) Chris Evert
3	(United States) Serena Williams
3	(Australia) Ashleigh Barty

Year-end rankings total through 2025

#	No. 1
8	(Germany) Steffi Graf
7	(United States) Martina Navratilova
5	(United States) Chris Evert
5	(United States) Serena Williams
4	(United States) Lindsay Davenport

#	Top 2
12	(United States) Chris Evert
10	(United States) Martina Navratilova
10	(Germany) Steffi Graf
7	(United States) Serena Williams
6	(United States) Lindsay Davenport

#	Top 3
16	(United States) Martina Navratilova
14	(United States) Chris Evert
11	(Germany) Steffi Graf
9	(United States) Serena Williams
7	(United States) Lindsay Davenport

#	Top 4
18	(United States) Martina Navratilova
14	(United States) Chris Evert
11	(Germany) Steffi Graf
11	(United States) Serena Williams
8	(Russia) Maria Sharapova

#	Top 5
19	(United States) Martina Navratilova
14	(United States) Chris Evert
11	(Germany) Steffi Graf
11	(United States) Serena Williams
9	(Russia) Maria Sharapova

#	Top 10
20	(United States) Martina Navratilova
16	(United States) Serena Williams
15	(United States) Chris Evert
13	(Germany) Steffi Graf
13	(Socialist Federal Republic of Yugoslavia) / (United States) Monica Seles
13	(United States) **Venus Williams**

== Prize money ==
See WTA Prize money. As prize money has increased dramatically in recent decades, the lists of prize money leaders for the Open Era (since 1968) and for the WTA Tour period (since 1973) are the same.

== See also ==
- All-time tennis records – Women's singles
- WTA Tour records
- Lists of tennis records and statistics
- Open Era tennis records – Men's singles
