= 1982 Toyota Series Championships – Singles =

Singles
- 1982 Toyota Series Championships

Final
- Champion: (United States) Martina Navratilova
- Runner-up: (United States) Chris Evert Lloyd
- Score: 4–6, 6–1, 6–2

Details
- Draw: 12
- Seeds: 4

Events
Singles	Doubles
← 1981 ·	Toyota Championships

Tracy Austin was the defending champion, but lost in semifinals to Chris Evert Lloyd with a double bagel.

Martina Navratilova won the title by defeating Chris Evert Lloyd 4–6, 6–1, 6–2 in the final.

== Seeds ==
All seeds received a bye to the quarterfinals.

1. (United States) Martina Navratilova (champion)
2. (United States) Chris Evert Lloyd (final)
3. (United States) Andrea Jaeger (quarterfinals)
4. (Czechoslovakia) Hana Mandlíková (semifinals)

== Draw ==
=== Key ===
- Q = Qualifier
- WC = Wild card
- LL = Lucky loser
- Alt = Alternate
- SE = Special exempt
- PR = Protected ranking
- ITF = ITF entry
- JE = Junior exempt
- w/o = Walkover
- r = Retired
- d = Defaulted
- SR = Special ranking

=== Draw ===
First round
(United States) Bonnie Gadusek	1	1
(Australia) Wendy Turnbull	6	6
(United States) Barbara Potter	5	6	6
(Romania) Virginia Ruzici	7	3	2
(United States) Tracy Austin	6	4	6
(Socialist Federal Republic of Yugoslavia) Mima Jaušovec	2	6	1
(United States) Pam Shriver	6	7
(West Germany) Bettina Bunge	3	6

Quarterfinals
1	(United States) Martina Navratilova	6	6
(Australia) Wendy Turnbull	2	1
4	(Czechoslovakia) Hana Mandlíková	4	6	7
(United States) Barbara Potter	6	3	6
(United States) Tracy Austin	6	6
3	(United States) Andrea Jaeger	4	4
(United States) Pam Shriver	2	3
2	(United States) Chris Evert Lloyd	6	6

Semifinals
1	(United States) Martina Navratilova	7	6
4	(Czechoslovakia) Hana Mandlíková	6	1
(United States) Tracy Austin	0	0
2	(United States) Chris Evert Lloyd	6	6

Final
1	(United States) Martina Navratilova	4	6	6
2	(United States) Chris Evert Lloyd	6	1	2
