= 1980 Avon Championships – Doubles =

Doubles
- 1980 Avon Championships

Final
- Champions: (United States) Billie Jean King (Czechoslovakia) Martina Navratilova
- Runners-up: (United States) Rosemary Casals (Australia) Wendy Turnbull
- Score: 6–3, 4–6, 6–3

Events
Singles	Doubles
← 1979 ·	WTA Finals	· 1981 →

Billie Jean King and Martina Navratilova defeated Rosemary Casals and Wendy Turnbull in the final, 6–3, 4–6, 6–3 to win the doubles tennis title at the 1980 Avon Championships. It was King's fourth and last Tour Finals title, and Navratilova's third.

Françoise Dürr and Betty Stöve were the reigning champions, but did not qualify this year.

== Seeds ==
1. (United States) Billie Jean King / (Czechoslovakia) Martina Navratilova (champions)
2. (United States) Rosemary Casals / (Australia) Wendy Turnbull (final)

== Draw ==
=== Key ===
- Q = Qualifier
- WC = Wild card
- LL = Lucky loser
- Alt = Alternate
- SE = Special exempt
- PR = Protected ranking
- ITF = ITF entry
- JE = Junior exempt
- w/o = Walkover
- r = Retired
- d = Defaulted
- SR = Special ranking

=== Draw ===
Semifinals
1	(United States) Billie Jean King (Czechoslovakia) Martina Navratilova	6	6
(United States) Kathy Jordan (United States) Anne Smith	4	3
(United States) Laura duPont (United States) Pam Shriver	3	7	4
2	(United States) Rosemary Casals (Australia) Wendy Turnbull	6	6	6

Final
1	(United States) Billie Jean King (Czechoslovakia) Martina Navratilova	6	4	6
2	(United States) Rosemary Casals (Australia) Wendy Turnbull	3	6	3
