= 1980 Colgate Series Championships =

- Date: January 7–12, 1981
- Edition: 4th
- Category: Virginia Slims circuit
- Draw: 8S / 4D
- Prize money: $250,000
- Surface: Carpet (Sporteze) / indoor
- Location: Landover, Maryland, U.S.
- Venue: Capital Centre

Champions

Singles
- (United States) Tracy Austin

Doubles
- (United States) Rosemary Casals / (Australia) Wendy Turnbull
← 1979 ·	Toyota Championships	· 1981 →

The 1980 Colgate Series Championships was a women's tennis tournament played on indoor carpet courts at the Capital Centre in Landover, Maryland in the United States that was the season-ending tournament of the 1980 Colgate World Championship Series. The eight singles players with the most ranking points qualified for the tournament. It was the fourth edition of the tournament and was held from January 7 through January 12, 1981. Tracy Austin won the singles title and earned $75,000 first-prize money.

== Finals ==
=== Singles ===
(United States) Tracy Austin defeated (United States) Andrea Jaeger 6–2, 6–2

=== Doubles ===
(United States) Rosemary Casals / (Australia) Wendy Turnbull defeated (United States) Candy Reynolds / (United States) Paula Smith 6–3, 4–6, 7–6^{(7–5)}

== Prize money ==
Event	W	F	3rd	4th	5th	6th	7th	8th
Singles	$75,000	$40,000	$22,000	$17,800	$11,000	$9,000	$7,000	$6,000
Doubles	$30,000	$16,000	$10,000	$7,000	NA	NA	NA	NA

Doubles prize money is per team.

== See also ==
- 1980 Avon Championships
