= 1982 Toyota Series Championships – Doubles =

Doubles
- 1982 Toyota Series Championships

Final
- Champions: (United States) Martina Navratilova (United States) Pam Shriver
- Runners-up: (United States) Candy Reynolds (United States) Paula Smith
- Score: 6–4, 7–5

Details
- Draw: 6
- Seeds: 2

Events
| Singles | Doubles |
| ← 1981 · | Toyota Championships |

Martina Navratilova and Pam Shriver were the defending champions and successfully defended their title, by defeating Candy Reynolds and Paula Smith 6–4, 7–5 in the final.

== Seeds ==
Both seeds received a bye to the semifinals.

1. (United States) Rosemary Casals / (Australia) Wendy Turnbull (semifinals)
2. (United States) Martina Navratilova / (United States) Pam Shriver (champions)

== Draw ==
=== Key ===
- Q = Qualifier
- WC = Wild card
- LL = Lucky loser
- Alt = Alternate
- SE = Special exempt
- PR = Protected ranking
- ITF = ITF entry
- JE = Junior exempt
- w/o = Walkover
- r = Retired
- d = Defaulted
- SR = Special ranking

=== Draw ===
| Quarterfinals | | | Semifinals | | | | | Final |
| | | | 1 | (United States) Rosemary Casals (Australia) Wendy Turnbull | 4 | 6 | 6 |
| (United States) Candy Reynolds (United States) Paula Smith | 6 | 6 | | (United States) Candy Reynolds (United States) Paula Smith | 6 | 4 | 7 |
| (United States) Leslie Allen (Socialist Federal Republic of Yugoslavia) Mima Jaušovec | 1 | 2 | | | | | | | (United States) Candy Reynolds (United States) Paula Smith | 4 | 5 |
| (United States) JoAnne Russell (Romania) Virginia Ruzici | 3 | 0 | | | | | | 2 | (United States) Martina Navratilova (United States) Pam Shriver | 6 | 7 |
| (United States) Barbara Potter (United States) Sharon Walsh | 6 | 6 | | (United States) Barbara Potter (United States) Sharon Walsh | 2 | 1 |
| | | | 2 | (United States) Martina Navratilova (United States) Pam Shriver | 6 | 6 |
