= 1980 Avon Championships – Singles =

Singles
- 1980 Avon Championships

Final
- Champion: (United States) Tracy Austin
- Runner-up: (United States) Martina Navratilova
- Score: 6–2, 2–6, 6–2

Details
- Draw: 8 (round robin + elimination)

Events
Singles	Doubles
← 1979 ·	WTA Finals	· 1981 →

Tracy Austin defeated the two-time defending champion Martina Navratilova in the final, 6–2, 2–6, 6–2 to win the singles tennis title at the 1980 Avon Championships.

== Seeds ==
1. (United States) Martina Navratilova (final)
2. (United States) Tracy Austin (champion)

== Draw ==
=== Key ===
- Q = Qualifier
- WC = Wild card
- LL = Lucky loser
- Alt = Alternate
- SE = Special exempt
- PR = Protected ranking
- ITF = ITF entry
- JE = Junior exempt
- w/o = Walkover
- r = Retired
- d = Defaulted
- SR = Special ranking

=== Finals ===
Play-off round
(Australia) Evonne Goolagong	6	6
(United States) Kathy Jordan	2	4
(Australia) Wendy Turnbull	2	2
(United States) Billie Jean King	6	6

Semifinals
1	(United States) Martina Navratilova	6	3	6
(Australia) Evonne Goolagong	2	6	0
2	(United States) Tracy Austin	6	6
(United States) Billie Jean King	3	1

Final
1	(United States) Martina Navratilova	2	6	2
2	(United States) Tracy Austin	6	2	6

=== Round robin ===
==== Group A ====
		(United States) Navratilova	(United States) Jordan	(United States) King	(United Kingdom) Wade	RR W–L	Set W–L	Game W–L	Standings
1	(United States) Martina Navratilova		6–2, 6–1	6–2, 6–1	Not played	2–0	4–0	24–6 (80.0%)	1 Q
	(United States) Kathy Jordan	2–6, 1–6		Not played	1–6, 6–3, 6–0	1–1	2–3	16–21 (43.2%)	3 PO
	(United States) Billie Jean King	2–6, 1–6	Not played		6–1, 6–3	1–1	2–2	15–16 (48.4%)	2 PO
	(United Kingdom) Virginia Wade	Not played	6–1, 3–6, 0–6	1–6, 3–6		0–2	1–4	13–25 (34.2%)	4

Q: qualifies to semifinals. PO: advances to play-off round.

==== Group B ====
		(United States) Austin	(Australia) Goolagong	(South Africa) Stevens	(Australia) Turnbull	RR W–L	Set W–L	Game W–L	Standings
2	(United States) Tracy Austin		6–1, 4–6, 7–6	6–3, 5–3, retired	Not played	2–0	4–1	28–19 (59.6%)	1 Q
	(Australia) Evonne Goolagong	1–6, 6–4, 6–7		Not played	7–6, 6–4	1–1	3–2	26–27 (49.1%)	2 PO
	(South Africa) Greer Stevens	3–6, 3–5, retired	Not played		Withdrew	0–2	0–2	6–11 (35.3%)	4
	(Australia) Wendy Turnbull	Not played	6–7, 4–6	Walkover		1–1	0–2	10–13 (43.5%)	3 PO

Q: qualifies to semifinals. PO: advances to play-off round.
