= 1981 Avon Championships – Singles =

Singles
- 1981 Avon Championships

Final
- Champion: (United States) Martina Navratilova
- Runner-up: (United States) Andrea Jaeger
- Score: 6–3, 7–6^{(7–3)}

Details
- Draw: 8 (RR + elimination)

Events
Singles	Doubles
← 1980 ·	WTA Tour Championships	· 1982 →

Martina Navratilova defeated Andrea Jaeger in the final, 6–3, 7–6^{(7–3)} to win the singles tennis title at the 1981 Avon Championships. It was her third Tour Finals title, fifth singles title of the season, and 50th career singles title.

Tracy Austin was the defending champion, but did not qualify this year.

== Seeds ==
1. (United States) Martina Navratilova (champion)
2. (United States) Andrea Jaeger (final)

== Draw ==
=== Key ===
- Q = Qualifier
- WC = Wild card
- LL = Lucky loser
- Alt = Alternate
- SE = Special exempt
- PR = Protected ranking
- ITF = ITF entry
- JE = Junior exempt
- w/o = Walkover
- r = Retired
- d = Defaulted
- SR = Special ranking

=== Finals ===
Play-off round
(United States) Leslie Allen	1	3
(West Germany) Bettina Bunge	6	6
(Czechoslovakia) Hana Mandlíková	6	1	0
(West Germany) Sylvia Hanika	1	6	6

Semifinals
1	(United States) Martina Navratilova	6	7
(West Germany) Bettina Bunge	2	5
2	(United States) Andrea Jaeger	6	5	6
(West Germany) Sylvia Hanika	4	7	4

Final
1	(United States) Martina Navratilova	6	7^{7}
2	(United States) Andrea Jaeger	3	6^{3}

=== Round robin ===
==== Group A ====
		(United States) Navratilova	(United States) Allen	(Czechoslovakia) Mandlíková	(United States) Shriver	RR W–L	Set W–L	Game W–L	Standings
1	(United States) Martina Navratilova		6–3, 6–0	Not played	3–6, 6–1, 6–3	2–0	4–1 (80.0%)	27–13 (67.5%)	1 Q
	(United States) Leslie Allen	3–6, 0–6		7–5, 6–1	Not played	1–1	2–2 (50.0%)	16–18 (47.1%)	2 PO
	(Czechoslovakia) Hana Mandlíková	Not played	5–7, 1–6		6–2, 7–6	1–1	2–2 (50.0%)	19–21 (47.5%)	3 PO
	(United States) Pam Shriver	6–3, 1–6, 3–6	Not played	2–6, 6–7		0–2	1–4 (20.0%)	18–28 (39.1%)	4

Q: qualifies to semifinals. PO: advances to play-off round. Allen takes 2nd place after defeating Mandlíková

==== Group B ====
		(United States) Jaeger	(West Germany) Hanika	(West Germany) Bunge	(United States) Potter	RR W–L	Set W–L	Game W–L	Standings
2	(United States) Andrea Jaeger		6–2, 6–3	6–4, 6–3	Not played	2–0	4–0 (100%)	24–12 (66.6%)	1 Q
	(West Germany) Sylvia Hanika	2–6, 3–6		Not played	6–0, 6–2	1–1	2–2 (50.0%)	17–14 (54.8%)	2 PO
	(West Germany) Bettina Bunge	4–6, 3–6	Not played		6–3, 6–2	1–1	2–2 (50.0%)	19–17 (52.7%)	3 PO
	(United States) Barbara Potter	Not played	0–6, 2–6	3–6, 2–6		0–2	0–4 (0.0%)	7–24 (22.6%)	4

Q: qualifies to semifinals. PO: advances to play-off round.
