= 1978 Colgate Series Championships =

- Date: November 14–19
- Edition: 2nd
- Category: Virginia Slims circuit
- Draw: 8S / 4D
- Prize money: $250,000
- Surface: Hard / outdoor
- Location: Palm Springs, California, U.S.
- Venue: Mission Hills Country Club

Champions

Singles
- (United States) Chris Evert

Doubles
- (United States) Billie Jean King (United States) Martina Navratilova
← 1977 ·	Toyota Championships	· 1979 →

The 1978 Colgate Series Championships was a women's tennis tournament played on outdoor hard courts at the Mission Hills Country Club in Palm Springs, California in the United States that was the season-ending tournament of the 1978 Virginia Slims World Championship Series. It was the second edition of the tournament and was held from November 14 through November 19, 1978. Chris Evert won the singles title and earned $75,000 first-prize money.

== Finals ==
=== Singles ===
(United States) Chris Evert defeated (United States) Martina Navratilova 6–3, 6–3

- It was Evert's 6th singles title of the year and the 84th of her career.

=== Doubles ===
(United States) Billie Jean King / (United States) Martina Navratilova defeated (Australia) Wendy Turnbull / (Australia) Kerry Reid 6–3, 6–4

== Prize money ==
Event	W	F	3rd	4th	5th	6th	7th	8th
Singles	$75,000	$40,000	$22,000	$17,800	$11,000	$9,000	$7,000	$6,000
Doubles	$30,000	$16,000	$10,000	$7,000	NA	NA	NA	NA

Doubles prize money is per team.

== See also ==
- Evert–Navratilova rivalry
- 1978 Virginia Slims Championships
