= 1980 Avon Championships =

- Date: March 17–23
- Edition: 9th
- Category: Avon Championships
- Draw: 8S / 4D
- Prize money: $300,000
- Surface: Carpet / indoor
- Location: New York City, New York
- Venue: Madison Square Garden

Champions

Singles
- (United States) Tracy Austin

Doubles
- (United States) Billie Jean King / (Czechoslovakia) Martina Navratilova
← 1979 ·	WTA Championships	· 1981 →

The 1980 Avon Championships were the ninth WTA Tour Championships, the annual tennis tournament for the best female tennis players on the 1980 WTA Tour. It was held in the week of 17 March 1980, in Madison Square Garden in New York City, New York. Second-seeded Tracy Austin won the singles title and earner $100,000 first-prize money.

== Finals ==
=== Singles ===
(United States) Tracy Austin defeated (United States) Martina Navratilova, 6–2, 2–6, 6–2

- It was Austin's 4th singles title of the year and the 14th of her career.

=== Doubles ===
(United States) Billie Jean King / (United States) Martina Navratilova defeated (United States) Rosemary Casals / (Australia) Wendy Turnbull, 6–3, 4–6, 6–3

== See also ==
- 1980 Colgate Series Championships
