= 1980 Porsche Tennis Grand Prix =

- Date: 3–9 November
- Edition: 3rd
- Category: Colgate Series (AAA)
- Draw: 32S / 16D
- Prize money: $125,000
- Surface: Carpet / indoor
- Location: Filderstadt, West Germany
- Venue: Tennis Sporthalle Filderstadt

Champions

Singles
- (United States) Tracy Austin

Doubles
- (Czechoslovakia) Hana Mandlíková / (Netherlands) Betty Stöve
← 1979 ·	Women's Stuttgart Open	· 1981 →

The 1980 Porsche Tennis Grand Prix was a women's singles tennis tournament played on indoor carpet courts at the Tennis Sporthalle Filderstadt in Filderstadt in West Germany. The event was part of the AAA (Note: Tournaments with prize money for the women of at least $125,000.) category of the 1980 Colgate Series. It was the third edition of the tournament and was held from 3 November through 9 November 1980. First-seeded Tracy Austin won the singles event, her third successive singles title at the event, and the accompanying $22,000 first-prize money.

== Finals ==
=== Singles ===
(United States) Tracy Austin defeated (United States) Sherry Acker 6–2, 7–5

- It was Austin's 10th title of the year and the 20th of her career.

=== Doubles ===
(Czechoslovakia) Hana Mandlíková / (Netherlands) Betty Stöve defeated (United States) Kathy Jordan / (United States) Anne Smith 6–4, 7–5

== Prize money ==
Event	W	F	SF	QF	Round of 16	Round of 32
Singles	$22,000	$11,000	$5,875	$2,800	$1,400	$700
