= 1979 Porsche Tennis Grand Prix =

- Date: 5–11 November
- Edition: 2nd
- Category: Colgate Series (AAA)
- Draw: 32S/16D
- Prize money: $100,000
- Surface: Carpet / indoor
- Location: Filderstadt, West Germany
- Venue: Tennis Sporthalle Filderstadt

Champions

Singles
- (United States) Tracy Austin

Doubles
- (United States) Billie Jean King (United States) Martina Navratilova
← 1978 ·	Women's Stuttgart Open	· 1980 →

The 1979 Porsche Tennis Grand Prix was a women's singles tennis tournament played on indoor carpet courts at the Tennis Sporthalle Filderstadt in Filderstadt in West Germany. The event was part of the AAA (Note: Tournaments with prize money for the women of at least $100,000.) category of the 1979 Colgate Series. It was the second edition of the tournament and was held from 5 November through 11 November 1979. Third-seeded Tracy Austin won the singles event, successfully defending her 1978 title, after defeating world No. 1 Martina Navratilova in the final. Austin was entitled to $20,000 first-prize money but elected to receive a Porsche 924 instead.

== Finals ==
=== Singles ===
(United States) Tracy Austin defeated (United States) Martina Navratilova 6–2, 6–0

- It was Austin's 6th title of the year and the 9th of her career.

=== Doubles ===
(United States) Billie Jean King / (United States) Martina Navratilova defeated (Australia) Wendy Turnbull / (Netherlands) Betty Stöve 6–3, 6–3

== Prize money ==
Event	W	F	SF	QF	Round of 16	Round of 32
Singles	$20,000	$10,000	$4,500	$2,100	$1,100	$550
