= 1981 Porsche Tennis Grand Prix =

- Date: 26 October – 1 November
- Edition: 4th
- Category: Toyota Series (Category 4)
- Draw: 32S / 16D
- Prize money: $125,000
- Surface: Carpet / indoor
- Location: Filderstadt, West Germany
- Venue: Tennis Sporthalle Filderstadt

Champions

Singles
- (United States) Tracy Austin

Doubles
- (Socialist Federal Republic of Yugoslavia) Mima Jaušovec (United States) Martina Navratilova
← 1980 ·	Women's Stuttgart Open	· 1982 →

The 1981 Porsche Tennis Grand Prix was a women's singles tennis tournament played on indoor carpet courts at the Tennis Sporthalle Filderstadt in Filderstadt in West Germany. The event was part of the Category 4 (Note: Tournaments with prize money for the women of at least $125,000.) tier of the 1981 Toyota Series. It was the fourth edition of the tournament and was held from 26 October through 1 November 1981. First-seeded Tracy Austin won the singles event, her fourth successive singles title at the event, and the accompanying $22,000 first-prize money.

== Finals ==
=== Singles ===
(United States) Tracy Austin defeated (United States) Martina Navratilova 4–6, 6–3, 6–4

- It was Austin's 6th title of the year and the 25th of her career.

=== Doubles ===
(Socialist Federal Republic of Yugoslavia) Mima Jaušovec / (United States) Martina Navratilova defeated (United States) Barbara Potter / (United States) Anne Smith 6–4, 6–1

== Prize money ==
Event	W	F	SF	QF	Round of 16	Round of 32
Singles	$22,000	$11,000	$5,500	$2,800	$1,500	$750
