= 1982 Toyota Series Championships =

- Date: December 14–19
- Edition: 6th
- Category: Virginia Slims circuit
- Draw: 12S / 6D
- Prize money: $300,000
- Surface: Carpet (Sporteze) / indoor
- Location: East Rutherford, NJ, U.S.
- Venue: Byrne Meadowlands Arena

Champions

Singles
- (United States) Martina Navratilova

Doubles
- (United States) Martina Navratilova / (United States) Pam Shriver
- Toyota Championships

The 1982 Toyota Series Championships was a women's tennis tournament played on indoor carpet courts at the Byrne Meadowlands Arena in East Rutherford, New Jersey in the United States that was the season-ending tournament of the 1982 Toyota World Championship Series. It was the sixth and last edition of the tournament and was held from December 14 through December 19, 1982. The top 12 singles players and top 6 doubles teams, in terms of Toyota Series ranking points, qualified for the event. First-seeded Martina Navratilova won the singles title and earned $75,000 first-prize money.

== Finals ==
=== Singles ===
(United States) Martina Navratilova defeated (United States) Chris Evert-Lloyd 4–6, 6–1, 6–2

- It was Navratilova's 15th singles title of the year and the 70th of her career.

=== Doubles ===
(United States) Martina Navratilova / (United States) Pam Shriver defeated (United States) Candy Reynolds / (United States) Paula Smith 6–4, 7–5

== Prize money ==
Event	W	F	SF	QF	Round of 16
Singles	$75,000	$40,000	$19,000	$11,000	$4,500
Doubles	$28,000	$15,000	$8,000	$5,500	NA

Doubles prize money is per team.

== See also ==
- Evert–Navratilova rivalry
- 1982 Avon Championships
