= 1978 Porsche Tennis Grand Prix =

- Date: 23–29 October
- Edition: 1st
- Category: Colgate Series (A)
- Draw: 32S/16D
- Prize money: $35,000
- Surface: Carpet / indoor
- Location: Filderstadt, West Germany
- Venue: Tennis Sporthalle Filderstadt

Champions

Singles
- (United States) Tracy Austin

Doubles
- (United States) Tracy Austin / (Netherlands) Betty Stöve
Women's Stuttgart Open	· 1979 →

The 1978 Porsche Tennis Grand Prix was a women's singles tennis tournament played on indoor carpet courts at the Tennis Sporthalle Filderstadt in Filderstadt in West Germany. The event was part of the A (Note: Tournaments with prize money for the women of at least $35,000.) category of the 1978 Colgate Series. It was the inaugural edition of the tournament and was held from 23 October through 29 October 1978. First-seeded Tracy Austin won the singles title, her first as a professional, and earned $6,000 first-prize money as well as a Porsche 924.

== Finals ==
=== Singles ===
(United States) Tracy Austin defeated (Netherlands) Betty Stöve 6–3, 6–3

- It was Austin's 1st singles title of the year and the 2nd of her career.

=== Doubles ===
(United States) Tracy Austin / (Netherlands) Betty Stöve defeated (Socialist Federal Republic of Yugoslavia) Mima Jaušovec / (Romania) Virginia Ruzici 6–3, 6–2

== Prize money ==
Event	W	F	SF	QF	Round of 16	Round of 32
Singles	$6,000	$3,000	$1,800	$900	$600	$325
