= 1981 Avon Championships – Doubles =

Doubles
- 1981 Avon Championships

Final
- Champions: (United States) Martina Navratilova (United States) Pam Shriver
- Runners-up: (United States) Barbara Potter (United States) Sharon Walsh
- Score: 6–0, 7–6

Details
- Draw: 4

Events
Singles	Doubles
- WTA Tour Championships

Defending champion Martina Navratilova and her partner Pam Shriver defeated Barbara Potter and Sharon Walsh in the final, 6–0, 7–6 to win the doubles tennis title at the 1981 Avon Championships. It was Navratilova's fourth Tour Finals doubles title, and Shriver's first.

Billie Jean King and Navratilova were the reigning champions, but King did not qualify this year.

== Draw ==
Key

- Q = Qualifier
- WC = Wild card
- LL = Lucky loser
- Alt = Alternate
- ITF = ITF entry
- PR = Protected ranking
- SR = Special ranking
- SE = Special exempt
- JE = Junior exempt
- JR = Junior Accelerator Programme entrant
- CO = College Accelerator Programme entrant
- NG = Next Gen Accelerator Program entrant
- w/o = Walkover
- r = Retired
- d = Defaulted

Semifinals
(United States) Martina Navratilova (United States) Pam Shriver	6	6
(United Kingdom) Sue Barker (United States) Ann Kiyomura	1	4
(United States) Barbara Potter (United States) Sharon Walsh	7	4	6
(United States) Rosemary Casals (Australia) Wendy Turnbull	6	6	3

Final
(United States) Martina Navratilova (United States) Pam Shriver	6	7
(United States) Barbara Potter (United States) Sharon Walsh	0	6
