= 1979 Colgate Series Championships =

Tennis tournament

- Date: January 2–7, 1980
- Edition: 3rd
- Category: Colgate circuit
- Draw: 8S / 4D
- Prize money: 250,000
- Surface: Carpet (Sporteze) / indoor
- Location: Landover, Maryland, U.S.
- Venue: Capital Centre
- Attendance: 50,112

Champions

Singles
- (United States) Martina Navratilova

Doubles
- (United States) Billie Jean King / (United States) Martina Navratilova
- Toyota Championships

The 1979 Colgate Series Championships was a women's tennis tournament played on indoor carpet courts at the Capital Centre in Landover, Maryland in the United States that was the season-ending tournament of the 1979 Colgate Series. It was the third edition of the tournament and was held from January 2 through January 7, 1980. Second-seeded Martina Navratilova won the singles title and earned $75,000 first-prize money.

== Finals ==
=== Singles ===
(United States) Martina Navratilova defeated (United States) Tracy Austin 6–2, 6–1

- It was Navratilova's 1st singles title of the year and the 35th of her career.

=== Doubles ===
(United States) Billie Jean King / (United States) Martina Navratilova defeated (United States) Chris Evert / (United States) Rosemary Casals 6–4, 6–3

== Prize money ==
Event	W	F	3rd	4th	5th	6th	7th	8th
Singles	$75,000	$40,000	$22,000	$17,800	$11,000	$9,000	$7,000	$6,000
Doubles	$30,000	$16,000	$10,000	$7,000	NA	NA	NA	NA

Doubles prize money is per team.

== See also ==
- 1979 Avon Championships
