= 1981 Avon Championships =

- Date: March 22–28
- Edition: 10th
- Category: WTA Tour Championships
- Draw: 8S / 4D
- Prize money: $300,000
- Surface: Carpet (Sporteze) / indoor
- Location: New York City, New York
- Venue: Madison Square Garden
- Attendance: 59,184

Champions

Singles
- (United States) Martina Navratilova

Doubles
- (United States) Martina Navratilova / (United States) Pam Shriver
← 1980 ·	WTA Championships	· 1982 →

The 1981 Avon Championships were the tenth WTA Tour Championships, the annual tennis tournament for the best female tennis players in singles and doubles on the 10-tournament Avon Championship winter circuit of the 1981 WTA Tour. It was held from March 22 through March 28, 1981 and was played on indoor carpet courts at the Madison Square Garden in New York City, New York. First-seeded Martina Navratilova won the singles title and earned $100,000 first-prize money.

== Finals ==
=== Singles ===
(United States) Martina Navratilova defeated (United States) Andrea Jaeger, 6–3, 7–6^{(7–3)}

- It was Navratilova's 5th singles title of the year and the 50th of her career.

=== Doubles ===
(United States) Martina Navratilova / (United States) Pam Shriver defeated (United States) Barbara Potter / (United States) Sharon Walsh, 6–0, 7–6^{(8–6)}

- It was Navratilova's 3rd doubles title of the year and the 57th of her career. It was Shriver's 3rd doubles title of the year and the 11th of her career.

== Prize money ==
Event	W	F	3rd	4th	5th/6th	7th/8th
Singles	$100,000	$52,000	$30,000	$22,000	$13,750	$9,250
Doubles	$25,000	$13,500	$5,750	$5,750	–	–

== See also ==
- 1981 Toyota Series Championships
