= Toyota Championships =

Defunct tennis tournament
- Event name: Colgate Series Championships (1977–81); Toyota Championships (1981–82)
- Tour: WTA Tour (1977–82)
- Founded: 1977
- Abolished: 1982
- Location: Palm Springs, CA, U.S. Landover MD, U.S. East Rutherford, NJ, U.S.
- Surface: Hard, Carpet

The Toyota Championships were the finales in an annual series of professional women's tennis tournaments for women from 1977 through 1982. They were a continuation of the earlier Colgate Series Championships (1977-80) They were the fall season finales of the Colgate Series, then later Toyota International Series circuits. They operated in much the same way as the men's WCT Circuit which also had WCT seasonal finals held in the fall or winter. The championships were discontinued when Virginia Slims became the year-round sponsor of the Women's Tennis Association Tour in 1983. The best singles and doubles players of the circuit, based on ranking points earned, qualified for the championships.

The main full season finales were, called the Virginia Slims Championships in 1972-78, then the Avon Championships in the 1979-82 period, then the Virginia Slims Championships again from 1983 to 1989. In 1990 a single unified women's circuit began, with a rebranded year end championship event called the WTA Tour Championships (today known as the WTA Finals)

== Finals ==
=== Singles ===
| Series Year | Series-Ending Tournament | Location | Surface | Champion | Runner-up | Score |
|---|---|---|---|---|---|---|
| 1977 | Colgate Series Championships | Palm Springs, California, U.S. | Hard | (United States) Chris Evert | (United States) Billie Jean King | 6–2, 6–2 |
| 1978 | Colgate Series Championships | Palm Springs, California, U.S. | Hard | (United States) Chris Evert | (Czech Republic) Martina Navratilova | 6–3, 6–3 |
| 1979 | Colgate Series Championships | Landover, Maryland, U.S. | Carpet | (Czech Republic) Martina Navratilova | (United States) Tracy Austin | 6–2, 6–1 |
| 1980 | Colgate Series Championships | Landover, Maryland, U.S. | Carpet | (United States) Tracy Austin | (United States) Andrea Jaeger | 6–2, 6–2 |
| 1981 | Toyota Series Championships | East Rutherford, New Jersey, U.S. | Carpet | (United States) Tracy Austin | (United States) Martina Navratilova | 2–6, 6–4, 6–2 |
| 1982 | Toyota Series Championships | East Rutherford, New Jersey, U.S. | Carpet | (United States) Martina Navratilova | (United States) Chris Evert | 4–6, 6–1, 6–2 |

=== Doubles ===
| Series Year | Champions | Runners-up | Score |
|---|---|---|---|
| 1977 | (France) Françoise Dürr (United Kingdom) Virginia Wade | (Australia) Helen Gourlay Cawley (United States) Joanne Russell | 6–1, 4–6, 6–4 |
| 1978 | (United States) Billie Jean King (United States) Martina Navratilova | (Australia) Wendy Turnbull (Australia) Kerry Reid | 6–3, 6–4 |
| 1979 | (United States) Billie Jean King (United States) Martina Navratilova | (United States) Chris Evert (United States) Rosemary Casals | 6–4, 6–3 |
| 1980 | (United States) Rosemary Casals (Australia) Wendy Turnbull | (United States) Candy Reynolds (United States) Paula Smith | 6–3, 4–6, 7–6 |
| 1981 | (United States) Martina Navratilova (United States) Pam Shriver | (United States) Rosemary Casals (Australia) Wendy Turnbull | 6–3, 6–4 |
| 1982 | (United States) Martina Navratilova (United States) Pam Shriver | (United States) Candy Reynolds (United States) Paula Smith | 6–4, 7–5 |

== See also ==
- WTA Tour Championships
