= 1979 Avon Championships =

- Date: March 21–25
- Edition: 8th
- Category: WTA Tour Championships
- Draw: 8S / 4D
- Prize money: $275,000
- Surface: Carpet / indoor
- Location: New York City, New York
- Venue: Madison Square Garden
- Attendance: 53,912

Champions

Singles
- (United States) Martina Navratilova

Doubles
- (France) Françoise Dürr / (Netherlands) Betty Stöve
← 1978 ·	WTA Championships	· 1980 →

The 1979 Avon Championships were the eighth WTA Tour Championships, the annual tennis tournament for the best female tennis players in singles and doubles on the 1979 WTA Tour. It was held on indoor carpet courts from March 21 through March 25, 1979, in Madison Square Garden in New York City, New York.

First-seeded Martina Navratilova won the singles title and earned $100,000 first-prize money.

For the first time since 1975, the doubles tournament at the WTA Finals was played separately from the WTA Doubles Championships which took place two weeks later in Japan, although by strange coincidence the final that year featured the same two pairings, the same outcome and almost the same scoreline (7–5, 7–6^{(9–7)}).

== Finals ==
=== Singles ===
(United States) Martina Navratilova defeated (United States) Tracy Austin, 6–3, 3–6, 6–2.

- It was Navratilova's 5th singles title of the year and the 29th of her career.

=== Doubles ===
(France) Françoise Dürr / (Netherlands) Betty Stöve defeated (United Kingdom) Sue Barker / (United States) Ann Kiyomura, 7–6^{(7–1)}, 7–6^{(7–3)}.

== See also ==
- 1979 Colgate Series Championships
