= 1981 Toyota Series Championships =

- Date: December 15–20
- Edition: 5th
- Category: Toyota International Series
- Draw: 8S / 4D
- Prize money: $250,000
- Surface: Carpet (Sporteze) / indoor
- Location: East Rutherford, NJ, U.S.
- Venue: Byrne Meadowlands Arena
- Attendance: 39,225

Champions

Singles
- (United States) Tracy Austin

Doubles
- (United States) Martina Navratilova / (United States) Pam Shriver
- Toyota Championships

The 1981 Toyota Series Championships was a women's tennis tournament played on indoor carpet courts at the Byrne Meadowlands Arena in East Rutherford, New Jersey in the United States that was the season-ending tournament of the 1981 Toyota World Championship Series. It was the fifth edition of the tournament and was held from December 15 through December 20, 1981. Third-seeded Tracy Austin won the singles title and earned $75,000 first-prize money.

== Finals ==
=== Singles ===
(United States) Tracy Austin defeated (United States) Martina Navratilova 2–6, 6–4, 6–2

- It was Austin's 8th singles title of the year and the 29th of her career.

=== Doubles ===
(United States) Martina Navratilova / (United States) Pam Shriver defeated (United States) Rosemary Casals / (Australia) Wendy Turnbull 6–3, 6–4

== Prize money ==
| Event | W | F | 3rd | 4th | 5th | 6th | 7th | 8th |
| Singles | $75,000 | $40,000 | $19,500 | $19,500 | $8,250 | $8,250 | $8,250 | $8,250 |
| Doubles | $30,000 | $16,000 | $8,500 | $8,500 | NA | NA | NA | NA |

Doubles prize money is per team.

== See also ==
- 1981 Avon Championships
