= Tracy Austin =

American tennis player (born 1962)

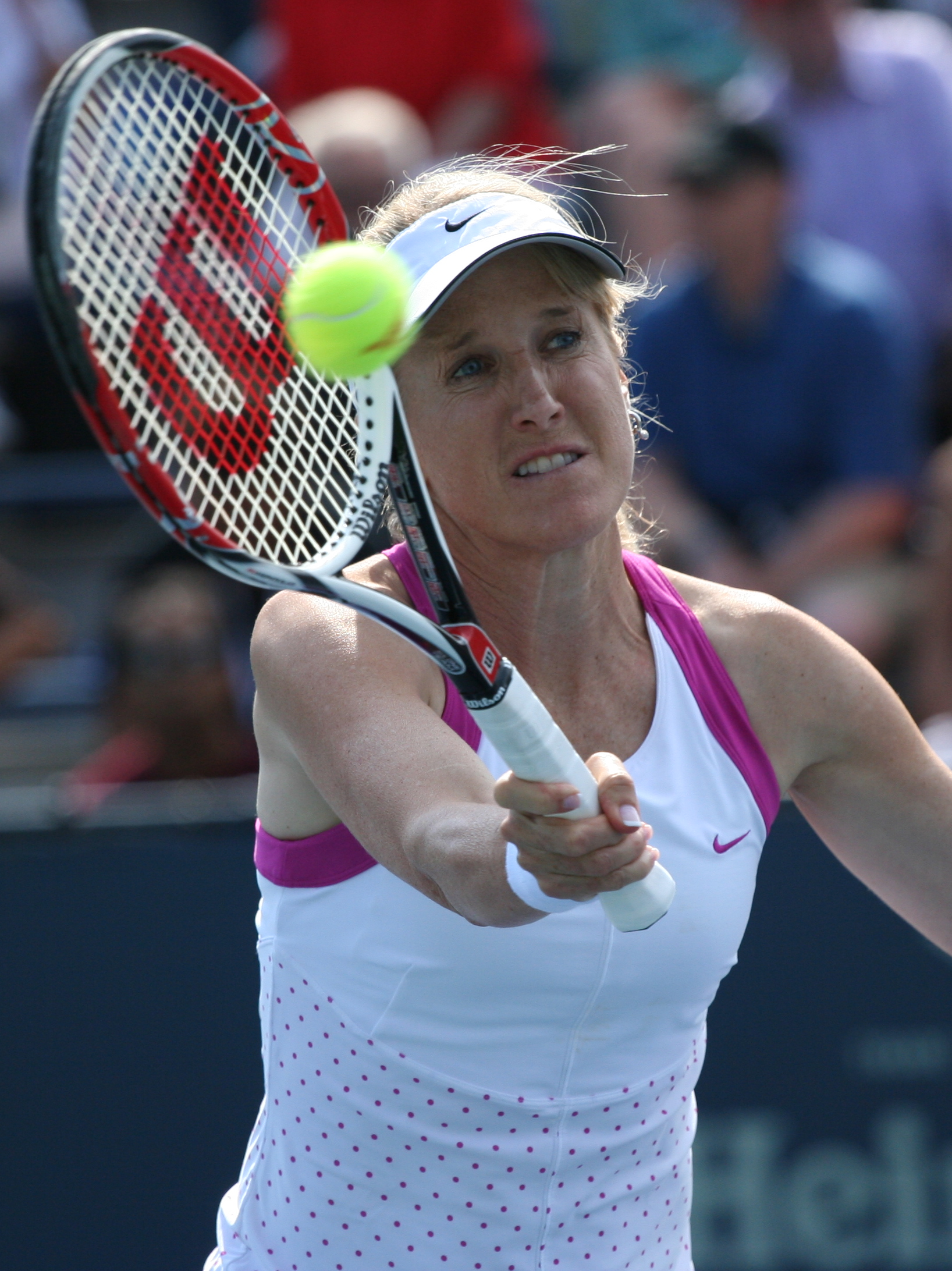
- Austin in 2009
- Country (sports): United States
- Residence: Rolling Hills, California, US
- Born: December 12, 1962 (age 63) Palos Verdes Peninsula, California, US
- Height: 5 ft 5 in (1.65 m)
- Turned pro: October 23, 1978 (age 15)
- Retired: July 1994 (age 31)
- Plays: Right-handed (two-handed backhand)
- Coach: Pancho Segura, Robert Lansdorp, Vic Braden
- Prize money: $2,092,380
- Int. Tennis HoF: 1992 (member page)

Singles
- Career record: 335–90
- Career titles: 30
- Highest ranking: No. 1 (April 7, 1980)

Grand Slam singles results
- Australian Open: QF (1981)
- French Open: QF (1982, 1983)
- Wimbledon: SF (1979, 1980)
- US Open: W (1979, 1981)

Other tournaments
- Tour Finals: W (1980)

Doubles
- Career record: 13–16
- Career titles: 5
- Highest ranking: No. 41 (August 14, 1989)

Grand Slam doubles results
- Wimbledon: 3R (1977)
- US Open: QF (1978, 1979)

Mixed doubles
- Career record: 15–6
- Career titles: 1

Grand Slam mixed doubles results
- Wimbledon: W (1980)
- US Open: SF (1988)

Team competitions
- Fed Cup: W (1978, 1979, 1980)
- Wightman Cup: W (1979, 1981)

Tracy Ann Austin Holt (born December 12, 1962) is an American former professional tennis player. She was ranked the world No. 1 in women's singles by the Women's Tennis Association (WTA) for 21 weeks. Austin won 30 WTA Tour-level singles titles, including two major titles at the 1979 and 1981 US Opens, and five doubles titles, including the mixed doubles title at the 1980 Wimbledon Championships, partnering her brother John. She won the 1980 WTA Tour Championships and the year-ending 1981 Toyota Championships, both in singles.

Austin remains the youngest US Open women's singles champion (aged 16) and the youngest inductee into the International Tennis Hall of Fame (aged 29). A series of injuries and a serious automobile accident in 1989 cut short her professional career.

She is now a tennis commentator.

== Early life ==
Austin was born on 12 December 1962 in Palos Verdes Peninsula, California. Her parents were George and Jeanne Austin.

== Career ==
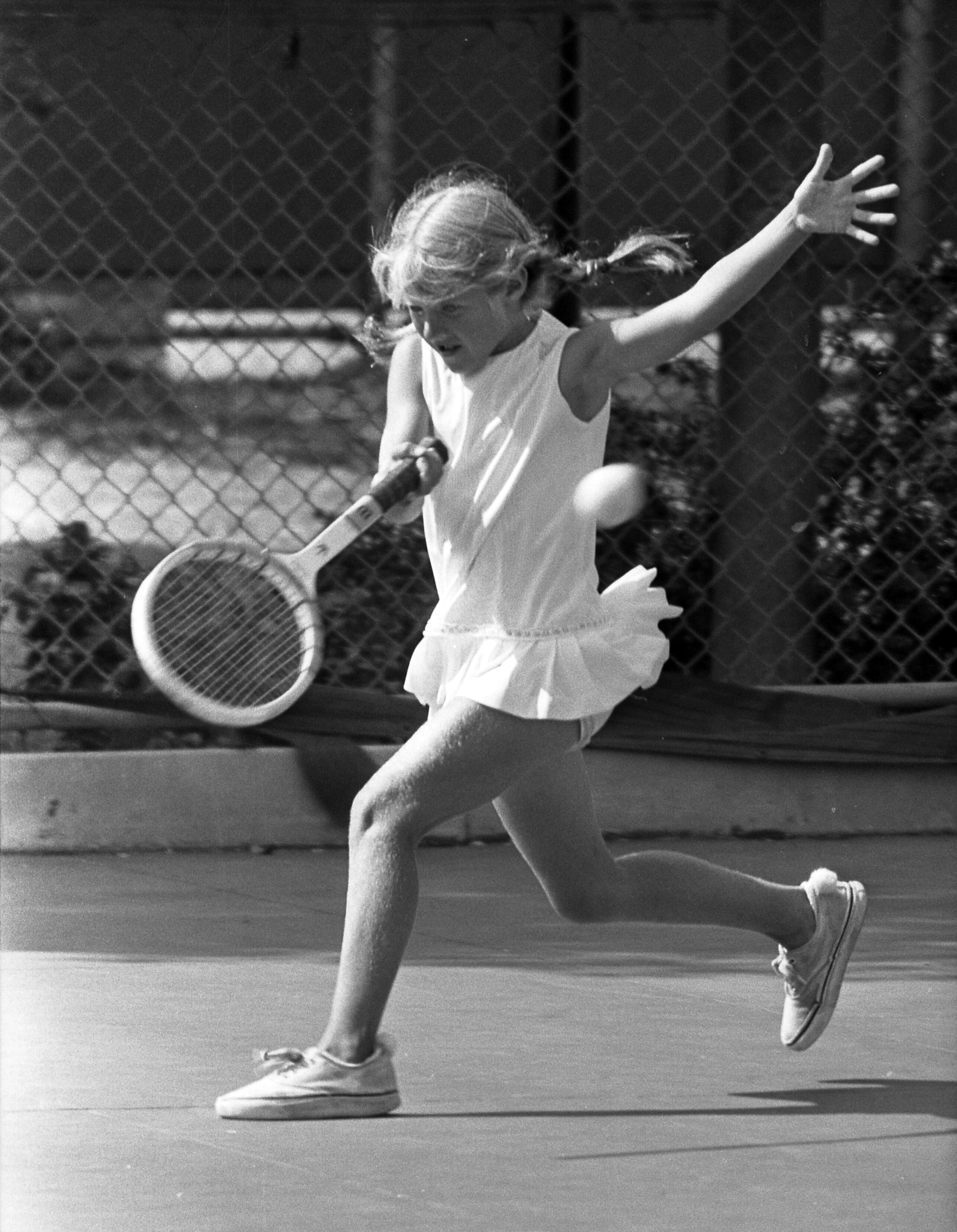
Austin playing in the Los Angeles Junior Tennis Tournament in 1972

=== 1977 to 1980 ===
In January 1977, a month after turning fourteen, Austin won her first professional singles title, defeating Stacy Margolin at the Avon Futures in Portland. As an amateur she could not accept the prize money. At her Wimbledon debut in 1977 she reached the third round but lost to top-seeded Chris Evert. In September, she made her US Open debut and reached the quarterfinal but lost to fifth-seeded Betty Stöve.

Less than two months before her sixteenth birthday, Austin turned professional in October 1978. In the same month, she won her first professional singles title, defeating Betty Stöve in the final of the Porsche Tennis Grand Prix in Filderstadt, West Germany.

Austin followed up with tournament wins in Tokyo and Washington, defeating Martina Navratilova in both finals. She defeated 35-year-old Billie Jean King in the quarterfinals of the 1979 Wimbledon Championships, then lost to eventual champion Navratilova in straight sets in the semifinals. In September, Austin became the youngest-ever US Open champion, aged 16 years and 9 months, by defeating second-seeded Navratilova in the semifinals and top seed Chris Evert in the final. Evert had been attempting to win the title for the fifth consecutive year. Earlier that year, Austin ended Evert's 125-match winning streak on clay by beating her in three sets in a semifinal of the Italian Open.

The Associated Press named Austin its Female Athlete of the Year for 1979.

Austin lost in the semifinals of both Grand Slam tournaments she played in 1980. Evonne Goolagong Cawley, seeded fourth and the eventual champion, defeated Austin at the Wimbledon Championships. As the top seed and defending champion at the US Open, Austin was expected to extend her five-match winning streak against third-ranked Evert. Austin took a 4–0 lead in the first set before Evert won 16 of the final 20 games to win the match. Evert went on to defeat Hana Mandlíková in the final. Austin was ranked the world No. 1 singles player in 1980 for two weeks (April 7–20) and then for 19 weeks (July 7–November 17), partly because she captured the two tour-ending events. Austin defeated Navratilova to win the Avon Championships in March, and Andrea Jaeger to capture the 1980 Colgate Series Championships in January 1981. In 1980, Austin won the Wimbledon mixed doubles title with her brother John, becoming the first brother-and-sister team to win a Grand Slam title together.

=== 1981 to 1983 ===
During the first four months of 1981, Austin played only two events because of chronic injuries. On grass, she defended her singles title at the Eastbourne International in the United Kingdom in June without losing a set. After Wimbledon, Austin won 26 consecutive matches and four consecutive tournaments. She defeated Pam Shriver in the final of the Wells Fargo Open in San Diego, and three weeks later, she beat both Navratilova and Evert in straight sets to win the Canadian Open in Toronto. As the third-seeded player at the US Open, Austin defeated fourth-seeded Navratilova in a three-set final. Navratilova, however, ended Austin's winning streak in the final of the U.S. Indoor Championships. In Europe during the autumn, Austin lost to Sue Barker in the quarterfinals of the Brighton International in Brighton, United Kingdom, but recovered the following week to defeat Navratilova in the final of the Porsche Tennis Grand Prix in Stuttgart, West Germany. At the final Grand Slam tournament of the year, Austin was seeded second but lost to sixth-seeded Shriver in the Australian Open quarterfinals. The 1981 year-ending Toyota Series Championships featured two matches against Evert and one against Navratilova. Evert won her round-robin match with Austin, then Austin defeated Evert in their semifinal. Austin won the tournament with a three-set defeat of Navratilova. The Associated Press named Austin its 1981 Female Athlete of the Year for the second time.

Austin was the first opponent of Steffi Graf when the German made her professional debut at the 1982 Porsche Tennis Grand Prix in Stuttgart. Austin defeated the 13-year-old Graf 6–4, 6–0.

Back injuries and recurring sciatica then began to impair Austin's effectiveness and sidelined her for long stretches. Billie Jean King, seeded twelfth, upset third-seeded Austin in the 1982 Wimbledon quarterfinals. Several weeks later, however, Austin won her 30th and final top-level singles title in San Diego. She had a good showing at the 1982 season-ending Toyota Series Championships, in which she defeated Jaeger, the world No. 3, in straight sets to reach the semifinals—in which, however, unable to repeat her victory of 1981, she lost to Evert.

In 1983, Austin was the runner-up at the Family Circle Cup, losing the final to Navratilova in three sets. She also reached the quarterfinals of the French Open.

=== 1984 to 1989 ===
Austin played sporadically from 1984 to 1987 and tried yet another comeback on the tour in 1988, when she played in seven doubles tournaments, and in 1989, when she played in one doubles and two singles tournaments. A highlight of this comeback included a semifinal showing in the 1988 US Open mixed doubles with partner Ken Flach. This comeback was ended by a near-fatal motor vehicle accident in Millburn, New Jersey, on August 3, 1989. A van coming from the opposite direction at 60mph crashed into her vehicle's driver side, and she suffered a bruised heart, a bruised spleen, a sprained back and a shattered knee. Following surgery and leaving the hospital, Austin was in a wheelchair for a few months, and she wasn't able to walk without crutches until December 1989.

=== 1992 to 1994 ===
In 1992, Austin became the youngest person to be inducted into the International Tennis Hall of Fame, at the age of 29. She attempted a second comeback in 1993 and 1994 but was not particularly successful. In 1993, Austin upset Rennae Stubbs and Katerina Maleeva at the Evert Cup in Indian Wells, California, then lost to Stephanie Rottier. At the WTA Manhattan Beach event, she upset Gigi Fernández and Elena Likhovtseva, then lost to Gabriela Sabatini in the round of 16. Her wins over Maleeva, Fernandez, and Likhovtseva began a buzz that Austin might become at least a top 20 player again. However, in 1994, her results were not as promising and at the Evert Cup in Indian Wells, California, Austin lost in the second round, 6-0, 6-0, to Steffi Graf and, soon after that, retired in June 1994.

=== Playing style ===
Austin possessed a solid baseline game, with a strong flat-hit forehand and reliable two-handed backhand. Her favorite shot was the backhand down the line and she considered her backhand to be more powerful and accurate than her forehand.

She had excellent court coverage and struck the ball deep, with substantial pace, and with pinpoint accuracy.

Austin's first serve was a mid-paced high percentage shot that functioned well on all playing surfaces, and although her second serve has been described as lacking penetration, she rarely double faulted.

== Post-tennis career ==
Austin first worked as a pundit and commentator in March 1991, for CBS, at the U.S. Women's Hardcourt Championships in San Antonio, a tournament which concluded with Steffi Graf recovering from a 1–4 deficit in the first set of the final to defeat Monica Seles 6–4, 6–3. Austin interviewed Graf on court after Graf's victory.

Since retiring as a player in 1994, Austin has worked as a pundit and commentator for NBC, CBS and the USA Network for the French Open and the US Open. During the 2000s, she worked for the Seven Network, which broadcast the Australian Open. She has worked for the BBC for many years. She began working for the Tennis Channel in 2010 and joined its US Open team and its Australian Open team in 2012. Austin has worked for Canadian television for its coverage of the Rogers Cup since 2004.

== Personal life ==
Austin is married to mortgage broker Scott Holt and is the mother of three sons: Sean, Brandon, and Dylan. Brandon Holt is also a professional tennis player and was previously a member of the USC tennis team.

Austin's older sister Pam and her brothers Jeff, Doug and John were professional tennis players. She is the sister-in-law of fitness author Denise Austin, who is married to Jeff.

== Major finals ==
=== Grand Slam finals ===
==== Singles: 2 (2 titles) ====
Result	Year	Championship	Surface	Opponent	Score
Win	1979	US Open	Hard	(United States) Chris Evert	6–4, 6–3
Win	1981	US Open	Hard	(United States) Martina Navratilova	1–6, 7–6^{(7–4)}, 7–6^{(7–1)}

==== Mixed doubles: 2 (1 title, 1 runner–up) ====
Result	Year	Championship	Surface	Partner	Opponents	Score
Win	1980	Wimbledon	Grass	(United States) John Austin	(Australia) Dianne Fromholtz (Australia) Mark Edmondson	4–6, 7–6^{(8–6)}, 6–3
Loss	1981	Wimbledon	Grass	(United States) John Austin	(Netherlands) Betty Stöve (South Africa) Frew McMillan	6–4, 6–7^{(2–7)}, 3–6

=== Year-end championships finals ===
==== Singles: 2 (1 title, 1 runner–up) ====
Result	Year	Championship	Surface	Opponent	Score
Loss	1979	New York City	Carpet (i)	(United States) Martina Navratilova	3–6, 6–3, 2–6
Win	1980	New York City	Carpet (i)	(United States) Martina Navratilova	6–2, 2–6, 6–2

== WTA career finals ==
=== Singles: 44 (30–14) ===
Legend Grand Slam tournaments (2–0) WTA Tour Championships (1–1) Virginia Slims, Avon Futures, Other (27–13)	Finals by surface Hard (11–3) Grass (2–0) Clay (3–2) Carpet (14–9)

Result	W/L	Date	Tournament	Surface	Opponent	Score
Win	1–0	Jan 1977	Portland, US	Hard (i)	(United States) Stacy Margolin	6–7, 6–3, 4–1 ret.
Loss	1–1	Mar 1978	Dallas, US	Carpet (i)	(Australia) Evonne Goolagong Cawley	6–4, 0–6, 2–6
Loss	1–2	Oct 1978	Phoenix, US	Hard	(United States) Martina Navratilova	4–6, 2–6
Win	2–2	Oct 1978	Filderstadt, West Germany	Carpet (i)	(Netherlands) Betty Stöve	6–3, 6–3
Win	3–2	Nov 1978	Tokyo, Japan	Hard (i)	(United States) Martina Navratilova	6–1, 6–1
Win	4–2	Jan 1979	Washington, US	Carpet (i)	(United States) Martina Navratilova	6–3, 6–2
Loss	4–3	Jan 1979	Chicago, US	Carpet (i)	(United States) Martina Navratilova	3–6, 4–6
Loss	4–4	Mar 1979	Avon Championships, US	Carpet (i)	(United States) Martina Navratilova	3–6, 6–3, 2–6
Win	5–4	Apr 1979	Hilton Head Island, US	Clay	(Australia) Kerry Melville Reid	7–6^{(7–3)}, 7–6^{(9–7)}
Win	6–4	May 1979	Rome, Italy	Clay	(West Germany) Sylvia Hanika	6–4, 1–6, 6–3
Win	7–4	Jul 1979	San Diego, US	Hard	(United States) Martina Navratilova	6–4, 6–2
Loss	7–5	Aug 1979	Mahwah, US	Hard	(United States) Chris Evert-Lloyd	7–6^{(7–2)}, 4–6, 1–6
Win	8–5	Aug 1979	US Open	Hard	(United States) Chris Evert-Lloyd	6–4, 6–3
Win	9–5	Nov 1979	Filderstadt, West Germany	Carpet (i)	(United States) Martina Navratilova	6–2, 6–0
Win	10–5	Dec 1979	Tokyo, Japan	Carpet (i)	(United States) Martina Navratilova	6–2, 6–1
Loss	10–6	Jan 1980	Landover, US	Carpet (i)	(United States) Martina Navratilova	2–6, 1–6
Win	11–6	Jan 1980	Cincinnati, US	Carpet (i)	(United States) Chris Evert-Lloyd	6–2, 6–1
Win	12–6	Jan 1980	Seattle, US	Carpet (i)	(United Kingdom) Virginia Wade	6–2, 7–6
Loss	12–7	Feb 1980	Los Angeles, US	Carpet (i)	(United States) Martina Navratilova	2–6, 0–6
Win	13–7	Mar 1980	Boston, US	Carpet (i)	(United Kingdom) Virginia Wade	6–2, 6–1
Win	14–7	Mar 1980	Avon Championships, US	Carpet (i)	(United States) Martina Navratilova	6–2, 2–6, 6–2
Win	15–7	Mar 1980	Carlsbad, US	Hard	(United States) Martina Navratilova	7–5, 6–2
Win	16–7	Apr 1980	Hilton Head Island, US	Clay	(Czechoslovakia) Regina Maršíková	3–6, 6–1, 6–0
Loss	16–8	Apr 1980	Orlando, US	Clay	(United States) Martina Navratilova	2–6, 4–6
Win	17–8	Jun 1980	Eastbourne, UK	Grass	(Australia) Wendy Turnbull	7–6, 6–2
Win	18–8	Jul 1980	San Diego, US	Hard	(Australia) Wendy Turnbull	6–1, 6–3
Win	19–8	Sep 1980	Minneapolis, US	Carpet (i)	(Australia) Dianne Fromholtz	6–1, 2–6, 6–2
Win	20–8	Nov 1980	Filderstadt, West Germany	Carpet (i)	(United States) Sherry Acker	6–2, 7–5
Loss	20–9	Nov 1980	Tampa, US	Hard	(United States) Andrea Jaeger	w/o
Loss	20–10	Nov 1980	Tokyo, Japan	Carpet (i)	(United States) Martina Navratilova	4–6, 3–6
Win	21–10	Dec 1980	Tucson, US	Carpet (i)	(United States) Peanut Louie	6–2, 6–0
Win	22–10	Jan 1981	Landover, US	Carpet (i)	(United States) Andrea Jaeger	6–2, 6–2
Win	23–10	Jun 1981	Eastbourne, UK	Grass	(United States) Andrea Jaeger	6–3, 6–4
Win	24–10	Jul 1981	San Diego, US	Hard	(United States) Pam Shriver	6–2, 5–7, 6–2
Win	25–10	Aug 1981	Toronto, Canada	Hard	(United States) Chris Evert-Lloyd	6–1, 6–4
Win	26–10	Sep 1981	US Open	Hard	(United States) Martina Navratilova	1–6, 7–6^{(7–4)}, 7–6^{(7–1)}
Win	27–10	Sep 1981	Atlanta, US	Hard	(United States) Mary-Lou Piatek	4–6, 6–3, 6–3
Loss	27–11	Sep 1981	Minneapolis, US	Carpet (i)	(United States) Martina Navratilova	0–6, 2–6
Win	28–11	Oct 1981	Filderstadt, West Germany	Carpet (i)	(United States) Martina Navratilova	4–6, 6–3, 6–4
Win	29–11	Dec 1981	East Rutherford, US	Carpet (i)	(United States) Martina Navratilova	2–6, 6–4, 6–2
Win	30–11	Jul 1982	San Diego, US	Hard	(United States) Kathy Rinaldi	7–6, 6–3
Loss	30–12	Oct 1982	Filderstadt, West Germany	Carpet (i)	(United States) Martina Navratilova	3–6, 3–6
Loss	30–13	Dec 1982	Richmond, US	Carpet (i)	(Australia) Wendy Turnbull	7–6^{(7–3)}, 2–6, 4–6
Loss	30–14	Apr 1983	Hilton Head Island, US	Clay	(United States) Martina Navratilova	7–5, 1–6, 0–6

=== Doubles: 7 (5–2) ===
Legend Grand Slam tournaments (0–0) WTA Tour Championships (0–0) Virginia Slims, Avon Futures, Other (5–2)	Finals by surface Hard (3–1) Grass (0–0) Clay (0–0) Carpet (2–1)

Result	W/L	Date	Tournament	Surface	Partner	Opponents	Score
Win	1–0	Oct 1978	Phoenix, US	Hard	(Netherlands) Betty Stöve	(United States) Martina Navratilova (United States) Anne Smith	6–4, 6–7, 6–2
Win	2–0	Oct 1978	Filderstadt, West Germany	Carpet (i)	(Netherlands) Betty Stöve	(Socialist Federal Republic of Yugoslavia) Mima Jaušovec (Romania) Virginia Ruzici	6–3, 6–2
Loss	2–1	Nov 1978	Tokyo, Japan	Hard (i)	(United States) Kathy May	(United States) Martina Navratilova (Netherlands) Betty Stöve	6–4, 6–7, 3–6
Loss	2–2	Jan 1979	Oakland, US	Carpet (i)	(Netherlands) Betty Stöve	(United States) Rosie Casals (United States) Chris Evert	6–3, 4–6, 3–6
Win	3–2	Jan 1979	Hollywood, US	Carpet (i)	(Netherlands) Betty Stöve	(United States) Rosie Casals (Australia) Wendy Turnbull	6–2, 2–6, 6–2
Win	4–2	Aug 1979	Mahwah, US	Hard	(Netherlands) Betty Stöve	(Socialist Federal Republic of Yugoslavia) Mima Jaušovec (Czechoslovakia) Regina Maršíková	7–6, 2–6, 6–4
Win	5–2	Jul 1980	San Diego, US	Hard	(United States) Ann Kiyomura	(United States) Rosie Casals (Australia) Wendy Turnbull	3–6, 6–4, 6–3

== Grand Slam singles tournament timeline ==
Key
W	F	SF	QF	#R	RR	Q#	DNQ	A	NH

(W) winner; (F) finalist; (SF) semifinalist; (QF) quarterfinalist; (#R) rounds 4, 3, 2, 1; (RR) round-robin stage; (Q#) qualification round; (DNQ) did not qualify; (A) absent; (NH) not held; (SR) strike rate (events won / competed); (W–L) win–loss record.

Tournament	1977		1978	1979	1980	1981	1982	1983	1984–93	1994	SR
Australian Open	A	A	A	A	A	QF	A	A	A	2R	0 / 2
French Open	A		A	A	A	A	QF	QF	A	1R	0 / 3
Wimbledon	3R		4R	SF	SF	QF	QF	A	A	A	0 / 6
US Open	QF		QF	W	SF	W	QF	A	A	A	2 / 6
SR	0 / 2		0 / 2	1 / 2	0 / 2	1 / 3	0 / 3	0 / 1	0 / 0	0 / 2	2 / 17
Year End Ranking	12		6	3	2	2	4	4		NR	

Note: The Australian Open was held twice in 1977, in January and December.

== See also ==
- List of female tennis players
- List of Grand Slam women's singles champions
- Performance timelines for all female tennis players since 1978 who reached at least one Grand Slam final

Sporting positions
Preceded by Martina Navratilova; Martina Navratilova	World No. 1 April 7, 1980 – April 20, 1980; July 1, 1980 – November 17, 1980	Succeeded by Martina Navratilova; Chris Evert
Awards
Preceded by No award	WTA Newcomer of the Year; 1977	Succeeded by Pam Shriver
