= 1979 in tennis =

This page covers all the important events in the sport of tennis in 1979. It provides the results of notable tournaments throughout the year on both the ATP and WTA Tours, the Davis Cup, and the Fed Cup.

== Australian Open ==
Category	Champion(s)	Finalist(s)	Score
Men's singles	(Argentina) Guillermo Vilas	(United States) John Sadri	7–6^{(7–4)}, 6–3, 6–2 (Note: It was Vilas' 4th and last career Grand Slam singles title and his 2nd title at the Australian Open.)
Women's singles	(United States) Barbara Jordan	(United States) Sharon Walsh	6–3, 6–3 (Note: It was Jordan's 1st and only career Grand Slam singles title.)
Men's doubles	(Australia) Peter McNamara (Australia) Paul McNamee	(Australia) Paul Kronk (Australia) Cliff Letcher	7–6, 6–2 (Note: It was McNamara's 1st career Grand Slam doubles title.) (Note: It was McNamee's 1st career Grand Slam doubles title.)
Women's doubles	(New Zealand) Judy Connor Chaloner (Australia) Diane Evers	(Australia) Leanne Harrison (Netherlands) Marcella Mesker	6–1, 3–6, 6–0 (Note: It was Connor's 1st and only career Grand Slam doubles title.) (Note: It was Evers's 1st and only career Grand Slam doubles title.)
Mixed doubles	This event was not held from 1970 until 1985.		

== French Open ==
Category	Champion(s)	Finalist(s)	Score
Men's singles	(Sweden) Björn Borg	(Paraguay) Víctor Pecci	6–3, 6–1, 6–7^{(6–8)}, 6–4 (Note: It was Borg's 7th career Grand Slam title, and his 4th French Open title.)
Women's singles	(United States) Chris Evert-Lloyd	(Australia) Wendy Turnbull	6–2, 6–0 (Note: It was Evert's 9th career Grand Slam title, and her 3rd French Open title.)
Men's doubles	(United States) Gene Mayer (United States) Sandy Mayer	(Australia) Ross Case (United States) Phil Dent	6–4, 6–4, 6–4
Women's doubles	(Netherlands) Betty Stöve (Australia) Wendy Turnbull	(France) Françoise Dürr (United Kingdom) Virginia Wade	3–6, 7–5, 6–4
Mixed doubles	(Australia) Wendy Turnbull (South Africa) Bob Hewitt	(Romania) Virginia Ruzici (Romania) Ion Țiriac	6–3, 2–6, 6–1

== Wimbledon ==
Category	Champion(s)	Finalist(s)	Score
Men's singles	(Sweden) Björn Borg	(United States) Roscoe Tanner	6–7^{(4–7)}, 6–1, 3–6, 6–3, 6–4 (Note: It was Borg's 8th career Grand Slam title, and his 4th Wimbledon title.)
Women's singles	(United States) Martina Navratilova	(United States) Chris Evert Lloyd	6–4, 6–4 (Note: It was Navratilova's 2nd career Grand Slam title, and her 2nd (consecutive) Wimbledon title.)
Men's doubles	(United States) Peter Fleming (United States) John McEnroe	(United States) Brian Gottfried (Mexico) Raúl Ramírez	4–6, 6–4, 6–2, 6–2
Women's doubles	(United States) Billie Jean King (United States) Martina Navratilova	(Netherlands) Betty Stöve (Australia) Wendy Turnbull	5–7, 6–3, 6–2 (Note: This was King's 20th Wimbledon title overall, surpassing Elizabeth Ryan's record of 19 overall titles. This record was subsequently matched by Navratilova in 2003.)
Mixed doubles	(South Africa) Bob Hewitt (South Africa) Greer Stevens	(South Africa) Frew McMillan (Netherlands) Betty Stöve	7–5, 7–6^{(9–7)}

== US Open ==
Category	Champion(s)	Finalist(s)	Score
Men's singles	(United States) John McEnroe	(United States) Vitas Gerulaitis	7–5, 6–3, 6–3 (Note: It was McEnroe's 1st career Grand Slam title.)
Women's singles	(United States) Tracy Austin	(United States) Chris Evert	6–4, 6–3 (Note: It was Austin's 1st career Grand Slam title. Austin also became the youngest-ever US Open champion, aged 16 years and 9 months.)
Men's doubles	(United States) John McEnroe (United States) Peter Fleming	(United States) Bob Lutz (United States) Stan Smith	6–2, 6–4
Women's doubles	(Netherlands) Betty Stöve (Australia) Wendy Turnbull	(United States) Billie Jean King (United States) Martina Navratilova	7–5, 6–3
Mixed doubles	(South Africa) Greer Stevens (South Africa) Bob Hewitt	(Netherlands) Betty Stöve (South Africa) Frew McMillan	6–3, 7–5

== Davis Cup ==
Semifinals; 5–8 October
Sydney, Australia (grass)
AME	United States	4
EAS	Australia	1
Rome, Italy (clay)
EUR-B	Czechoslovakia	1
EUR-A	Italy	4

Final; 14–16 December
San Francisco, United States (indoor carpet)
AME	United States	5
EUR-A	Italy	0

== Federation Cup ==
First Round
United States
Philippines	w/o
South Korea	0
West Germany	3
Thailand	0
Italy	3
Indonesia	0
France	3
Switzerland	3
Denmark	0
Mexico	1
Romania	2
Chinese Taipei	1
Luxembourg	2
Portugal	0
Soviet Union	3
Great Britain	3
New Zealand	0
Ireland	0
Belgium	3
Czechoslovakia	3
Hungary	0
Sweden	3
Israel	0
Netherlands	3
Argentina	0
Japan	3
Norway	0
Spain	1
Yugoslavia	2
Canada	0
Australia	3

Second Round
United States	3
West Germany	0
Italy	1
France	2
Switzerland	2
Romania	1
Luxembourg	0
Soviet Union	3
Great Britain	3
Belgium	0
Czechoslovakia	2
Sweden	1
Netherlands	3
Japan	0
Yugoslavia	0
Australia	3

Quarterfinals
United States	3
France	0
Switzerland	1
Soviet Union	2
Great Britain	0
Czechoslovakia	3
Netherlands	1
Australia	2

Semifinals
United States	2
Soviet Union	0
Czechoslovakia	0
Australia	3

Final
United States	3
Australia	0
