= 1978 Australian Open – Women's doubles =

Women's doubles
- 1978 Australian Open

Final
- Champions: (United States) Betsy Nagelsen (Czechoslovakia) Renáta Tomanová
- Runners-up: (Japan) Naoko Sato (Australia) Pam Whytcross
- Score: 7–5, 6–2

Details
- Draw: 16
- Seeds: 4

Events
Singles	men	women		boys	girls
Doubles	men	women	mixed	boys	girls
WC Singles	men	women	quad
WC Doubles	men	women	quad
Legends	men	women	mixed
- Australian Open

Evonne Cawley, Helen Gourlay-Cawley, Mona Guerrant and Kerry Reid were the reigning champions. None of them competed.

== Seeds ==
1. (United States) Betsy Nagelsen / (Czechoslovakia) Renáta Tomanová (champions)
2. (Australia) Cynthia Doerner / (Australia) Kym Ruddell (quarterfinals)
3. (United Kingdom) Sue Barker / (West Germany) Heidi Eisterlehner (first round)
4. (New Zealand) Judy Chaloner / (Australia) Patricia Gregg (first round)

== Draw ==
Key

- Q = Qualifier
- WC = Wild card
- LL = Lucky loser
- Alt = Alternate
- ITF = ITF entry
- PR = Protected ranking
- SR = Special ranking
- SE = Special exempt
- JE = Junior exempt
- JR = Junior Accelerator Programme entrant
- CO = College Accelerator Programme entrant
- NG = Next Gen Accelerator Program entrant
- w/o = Walkover
- r = Retired
- d = Defaulted

First round
1	(United States) B Nagelsen (Czechoslovakia) R Tomanová	6	7
(United States) R Blount (Australia) D Evers	2	5
(New Zealand) C Newton (Australia) M Robinson	7	3	0
(United States) P Bostrom (United States) B Norton	6	6	6
4	(New Zealand) J Chaloner (Australia) P Gregg	6	2	4
(Australia) C O'Neil (Austria) U Ulrich	2	6	6
(Australia) C Draper (Australia) K Pratt	2	4
(Australia) L Harrison (Australia) A Tobin	6	6
(Australia) S Saliba (Australia) M Sawyer	4	6	6
(Australia) J Dalton (Australia) W Gilchrist	6	1	1
(Japan) N Sato (Australia) P Whytcross	5	6	6
3	(United Kingdom) S Barker (West Germany) H Eisterlehner	7	2	3
(Australia) C Matison (Italy) S Simmonds	6	6
(Australia) N Gregory (Australia) K Hallam	2	2
(Denmark) D Ekner (Denmark) B Hermansen	3	2
2	(Australia) C Doerner (Australia) K Ruddell	6	6

Quarterfinals
1	(United States) B Nagelsen (Czechoslovakia) R Tomanová	7	4	6
(United States) P Bostrom (United States) B Norton	5	6	0
(Australia) C O'Neil (Austria) U Ulrich	6	6
(Australia) L Harrison (Australia) A Tobin	2	4
(Australia) S Saliba (Australia) M Sawyer	7	6	3
(Japan) N Sato (Australia) P Whytcross	6	7	6
(Australia) C Matison (Italy) S Simmonds	6	5	6
2	(Australia) C Doerner (Australia) K Ruddell	4	7	3

Semifinals
1	(United States) B Nagelsen (Czechoslovakia) R Tomanová	6	6
(Australia) C O'Neil (Austria) U Ulrich	2	2
(Japan) N Sato (Australia) P Whytcross	6	3	6
(Australia) C Matison (Italy) S Simmonds	2	6	2

Final
1	(United States) B Nagelsen (Czechoslovakia) R Tomanová	7	6
(Japan) N Sato (Australia) P Whytcross	5	2
