= 1978 Australian Open – Women's singles =

Women's singles
- 1978 Australian Open

Final
- Champion: (Australia) Chris O'Neil
- Runner-up: (United States) Betsy Nagelsen
- Score: 6–3, 7–6^{(7–3)}

Details
- Draw: 32 (4 Q )
- Seeds: 7

Events
Singles	men	women		boys	girls
Doubles	men	women	mixed	boys	girls
WC Singles	men	women	quad
WC Doubles	men	women	quad
Legends	men	women	mixed
- Australian Open

Chris O'Neil defeated Betsy Nagelsen in the final, 6–3, 7–6^{(7–3)} to win the women's singles tennis title at the 1978 Australian Open. It was her first and only major singles title. O'Neil did not lose a set during the tournament.

Evonne Goolagong was the reigning champion, but she did not compete this year due to injury.

== Seeds ==
The seeded players are listed below. Chris O'Neil is the champion; others show the round in which they were eliminated.

1. (United Kingdom) Sue Barker (quarterfinals)
2. (Czechoslovakia) Renáta Tomanová (quarterfinals)
3. (United States) Beth Norton (second round)
4. (Australia) Amanda Tobin (first round)
5. (United States) Renee Blount (second round)
6. (Australia) Cynthia Doerner (first round)
7. Withdrawn
8. (United States) Betsy Nagelsen (finalist)

== Draw ==
Key

- Q = Qualifier
- WC = Wild card
- LL = Lucky loser
- Alt = Alternate
- ITF = ITF entry
- PR = Protected ranking
- SR = Special ranking
- SE = Special exempt
- JE = Junior exempt
- JR = Junior Accelerator Programme entrant
- CO = College Accelerator Programme entrant
- NG = Next Gen Accelerator Program entrant
- w/o = Walkover
- r = Retired
- d = Defaulted

=== Finals ===
Quarterfinals
1	(United Kingdom) Sue Barker	2	6
(Australia) Dianne Evers	6	7
(Australia) Chris O'Neil	7	6
Q	(Denmark) Dorte Ekner	5	1
(Australia) Mary Sawyer	4	3
Q	(Australia) Christine Matison	6	6
8	(United States) Betsy Nagelsen	6	6
2	(Czechoslovakia) Renáta Tomanová	4	4

Semifinals
(Australia) Dianne Evers	0	3
(Australia) Chris O'Neil	6	6
Q	(Australia) Christine Matison	5	4
8	(United States) Betsy Nagelsen	7	6

Finals
(Australia) Chris O'Neil	6	7
8	(United States) Betsy Nagelsen	3	6

=== Earlier rounds ===
==== Section 1 ====
First round
1	(United Kingdom) S Barker	6	6
Q	(Australia) K Gulley	0	2
(Belgium) M Gurdal	6	6
(Australia) W Gilchrist	2	1
(Australia) D Evers	6	3	6
(Australia) K Ruddell	2	6	1
(Sweden) E Ekblom	4	3
5	(United States) R Blount	6	6
3	(United States) B Norton	6	6
Q	(Australia) J Walker	1	4
(Australia) C O'Neil	6	6
(Australia) L Harrison	2	4
(West Germany) H Eisterlehner	6	6
(Japan) N Sato	2	4
Q	(Denmark) D Ekner	6	6
6	(Australia) C Doerner	4	3

Second round
1	(United Kingdom) S Barker	6	7
(Belgium) M Gurdal	2	5
(Australia) D Evers	6	6
5	(United States) R Blount	4	3
3	(United States) B Norton	4	3
(Australia) C O'Neil	6	6
(West Germany) H Eisterlehner	6	1	2
Q	(Denmark) D Ekner	4	6	6

Quarterfinals
1	(United Kingdom) S Barker	2	6
(Australia) D Evers	6	7
(Australia) C O'Neil	7	6
Q	(Denmark) D Ekner	5	1

Semifinals
(Australia) D Evers	0	3
(Australia) C O'Neil	6	6

==== Section 2 ====
First round
LL	(Denmark) B Hermansen	2	5
(United States) P Bostrom	6	7
(Australia) M Sawyer	6	7
(Australia) K Hallam	2	5
(United States) K Sands	6	6
(Australia) S Saliba	2	0
Q	(Australia) C Matison	6	6
4	(Australia) A Tobin	1	3
8	(United States) B Nagelsen	6	6
(Italy) S Simmonds	1	3
(Sweden) N Bohm	6	6
(New Zealand) J Chaloner	4	2
(Australia) N Gregory	6	1	6
(Australia) K Pratt	3	6	3
(Australia) P Whytcross	4	1
2	(Czechoslovakia) R Tomanová	6	6

Second round
(United States) P Bostrom	6	3	5
(Australia) M Sawyer	4	6	7
(United States) K Sands	6	2	4
Q	(Australia) C Matison	1	6	6
8	(United States) B Nagelsen	6	6
(Sweden) N Bohm	3	4
(Australia) N Gregory	2	5
2	(Czechoslovakia) R Tomanová	6	7

Quarterfinals
(Australia) M Sawyer	6	6
Q	(Australia) C Matison	4	3
8	(United States) B Nagelsen	6	6
2	(Czechoslovakia) R Tomanová	4	4

Semifinals
Q	(Australia) C Matison	5	4
8	(United States) B Nagelsen	7	6

Preceded by 1978 US Open – Women's singles	Grand Slam women's singles	Succeeded by 1979 French Open – Women's singles
