= 1979 Australian Open – Women's singles =

Women's singles
- 1979 Australian Open

Final
- Champion: (United States) Barbara Jordan
- Runner-up: (United States) Sharon Walsh
- Score: 6–3, 6–3

Details
- Draw: 32 (4 Q )
- Seeds: 7

Events
Singles	men	women		boys	girls
Doubles	men	women	mixed	boys	girls
WC Singles	men	women	quad
WC Doubles	men	women	quad
Legends	men	women	mixed
- Australian Open

Barbara Jordan defeated Sharon Walsh in the final, 6–3, 6–3 to win the women's singles tennis title at the 1979 Australian Open. It was her first major title and first tour-level title overall. Jordan was making her tournament debut.

Chris O'Neil was the reigning champion, but did not compete this year.

This was only the second women's singles final not to feature an Australian player, the first being in 1935. This was also the first all-American final at the tournament.

== Seeds ==
The seeded players are listed below. They are ordered by the round in which they were knocked out.

1. (Romania) Virginia Ruzici (first round)
2. (Czechoslovakia) Hana Mandlíková (quarterfinals)
3. (Czechoslovakia) Renáta Tomanová (semifinals)
4. (United States) Sharon Walsh (finalist)
5. (United States) Barbara Jordan (champion)
6. n/a
7. (United States) Janet Newberry (quarterfinals)
8. (Australia) Cynthia Doerner (quarterfinals)

Note: The sixth seed withdrew and was replaced by Cathy Griffiths.

== Draw ==
Key

- Q = Qualifier
- WC = Wild card
- LL = Lucky loser
- Alt = Alternate
- ITF = ITF entry
- PR = Protected ranking
- SR = Special ranking
- SE = Special exempt
- JE = Junior exempt
- JR = Junior Accelerator Programme entrant
- CO = College Accelerator Programme entrant
- NG = Next Gen Accelerator Program entrant
- w/o = Walkover
- r = Retired
- d = Defaulted

=== Finals ===
Quarterfinals
(Australia) Mary Sawyer	7	6
7	(United States) Janet Newberry	6	3
4	(United States) Sharon Walsh	6	6
(Belgium) Michèle Gurdal	0	3
8	(Australia) Cynthia Doerner	2	1
3	(Czechoslovakia) Renáta Tomanová	6	6
5	(United States) Barbara Jordan	6	6
2	(Czechoslovakia) Hana Mandlíková	2	2

Semifinals
(Australia) Mary Sawyer	6	3
4	(United States) Sharon Walsh	7	6
3	(Czechoslovakia) Renáta Tomanová	7	3	3
5	(United States) Barbara Jordan	5	6	6

Finals
4	(United States) Sharon Walsh	3	3
5	(United States) Barbara Jordan	6	6

=== Earlier rounds ===
==== Section 1 ====
First round
1	(Romania) V Ruzici	6	2	4
(Australia) M Sawyer	0	6	6
(Japan) N Sato	7	6
(Australia) E Little	5	4
(Australia) L Cassell	6	0	3
(New Zealand) J Chaloner	2	6	6
(Australia) D Evers	6	6
7	(United States) J Newberry	4	4
4	(United States) S Walsh	6	6	6
(Netherlands) M Mesker	7	2	4
(Australia) J Dimond	5	4
(West Germany) J Diesslin	7	6
(Australia) K Pratt	6	6
Q	(New Zealand) C Newton	1	3
(Belgium) M Gurdal	6	4	6
LL	(Australia) C Griffiths	4	6	1

Second round
(Australia) M Sawyer	6	6
(Japan) N Sato	3	4
(New Zealand) J Chaloner	6	3	1
7	(United States) J Newberry	2	6	6
4	(United States) S Walsh	6	6
(West Germany) J Diesslin	1	4
(Australia) K Pratt	1	4
(Belgium) M Gurdal	6	6

Quarterfinals
(Australia) M Sawyer	7	6
7	(United States) J Newberry	6	3
4	(United States) S Walsh	6	6
(Belgium) M Gurdal	0	3

Semifinals
(Australia) M Sawyer	6	3
4	(United States) S Walsh	7	6

==== Section 2 ====
First round
8	(Australia) C Doerner	6	6
(Australia) K Ruddell	1	4
(Australia) S Leo	6	4	1
(Australia) S Saliba	4	6	6
(Australia) P Whytcross	5	6	6
(Sweden) M Wikstedt	7	3	2
(Australia) N Gregory	6	5
3	(Czechoslovakia) R Tomanová	7	7
5	(United States) B Jordan	6	6
(Australia) K Hallam	3	2
Q	(Australia) R Catton	3	1
Q	(Australia) A Minter	6	6
Q	(Australia) B Randall	6	2	3
(Australia) L Harrison	4	6	6
(Australia) J Walker	4	1
2	(Czechoslovakia) H Mandlíková	6	6

Second round
8	(Australia) C Doerner	5	7	6
(Australia) S Saliba	7	6	3
(Australia) P Whytcross	4	6	1
3	(Czechoslovakia) R Tomanová	6	4	6
5	(United States) B Jordan	7	6
Q	(Australia) A Minter	5	1
(Australia) L Harrison	4	5
2	(Czechoslovakia) H Mandlíková	6	7

Quarterfinals
8	(Australia) C Doerner	2	1
3	(Czechoslovakia) R Tomanová	6	6
5	(United States) B Jordan	6	6
2	(Czechoslovakia) H Mandlíková	2	2

Semifinals
3	(Czechoslovakia) R Tomanová	7	3	3
5	(United States) B Jordan	5	6	6

Preceded by 1979 US Open – Women's singles	Grand Slam women's singles	Succeeded by 1980 French Open – Women's singles
