= 1979 US Open – Women's doubles =

Women's doubles
- 1979 US Open

Final
- Champions: (Netherlands) Betty Stöve (Australia) Wendy Turnbull
- Runners-up: (United States) Billie Jean King (Czechoslovakia) Martina Navratilova
- Score: 7–5, 6–3

Details
- Draw: 48
- Seeds: 12

Events
Singles	men	women		boys	girls
Doubles	men	women	mixed	boys	girls
WC Singles	men	women	quad
WC Doubles	men	women	quad
Legends	men	women	mixed
← 1978 ·	US Open	· 1980 →

Billie Jean King and Martina Navratilova were the defending champions but lost in the final 5–7, 3–6 against Betty Stöve and Wendy Turnbull.

== Seeds ==
Champion seeds are indicated in bold text while text in italics indicates the round in which those seeds were eliminated. Three seeded teams and 13 unseeded teams received byes into the second round.

1. (Netherlands) **Betty Stöve** / (Australia) **Wendy Turnbull (champions)**
2. (United States) Billie Jean King / (Czechoslovakia) Martina Navratilova (final)
3. (United States) Rosie Casals / (United States) Chris Evert-Lloyd (semifinals)
4. (United Kingdom) Sue Barker / (United States) Ann Kiyomura (first round)
5. (France) Françoise Dürr / (United Kingdom) Virginia Wade (first round)
6. (Australia) Dianne Fromholtz / (South Africa) Marise Kruger (quarterfinals)
7. (South Africa) Ilana Kloss / (United States) Betty-Ann Stuart (third round)
8. (United States) Kathy Jordan / (United States) Anne Smith (second round)
9. (United States) Laura duPont / (United States) Sharon Walsh (first round)
10. (Czechoslovakia) Regina Maršíková / (Czechoslovakia) Renáta Tomanová (third round)
11. (United States) Tracy Austin / (United States) Kathy May-Teacher (quarterfinals)
12. (United States) Betsy Nagelsen / (United States) Pam Shriver (third round)

== Draw ==
=== Key ===
- Q = Qualifier
- WC = Wild card
- LL = Lucky loser
- Alt = Alternate
- SE = Special exempt
- PR = Protected ranking
- ITF = ITF entry
- JE = Junior exempt
- w/o = Walkover
- r = Retired
- d = Defaulted
- SR = Special ranking

=== Finals ===
Quarterfinals
1	(Netherlands) **Betty Stöve** (Australia) **Wendy Turnbull**	3	**7**	**6**
(United States) Diane Desfor (United States) Barbara Hallquist	**6**	6	3
3	(United States) **Rosie Casals** (United States) **Chris Evert-Lloyd**	**6**	**6**
6	(Australia) Dianne Fromholtz (South Africa) Marise Kruger	3	3
(United States) **Sherry Acker** (United States) **Julie Anthony**	**w/o**
11	(United States) Tracy Austin (United States) Kathy May-Teacher
(United States) Penny Johnson (United States) Paula Smith	1	3
2	(United States) **Billie Jean King** (Czechoslovakia) **Martina Navratilova**	**6**	**6**

Semifinals
1	(Netherlands) **Betty Stöve** (Australia) **Wendy Turnbull**	**6**	**7**
3	(United States) Rosie Casals (United States) Chris Evert-Lloyd	2	5
(United States) Sherry Acker (United States) Julie Anthony	2	5
2	(United States) **Billie Jean King** (Czechoslovakia) **Martina Navratilova**	**6**	**7**

Final
1	(Netherlands) **Betty Stöve** (Australia) **Wendy Turnbull**	**6**	**6**
2	(United States) Billie Jean King (Czechoslovakia) Martina Navratilova	4	3

=== Top half ===
==== Section 1 ====
First round
1	(Netherlands) **B Stöve** (Australia) **W Turnbull**	**6**	**6**
(United States) D Gilbert (United States) S Gordon	3	3
(United States) R Gerulaitis (Romania) M Simionescu	2	1
(United States) **A Moulton** (United States) **M L Piatek**	**6**	**6**
8	(United States) **K Jordan** (United States) **A Smith**	**6**	**6**
(United States) K Shaw-Ziska (United States) Linda Siegel	1	2
9	(United States) L duPont (United States) S Walsh	3	**7**	2
(United States) **D Desfor** (United States) **B Hallquist**	**6**	5	**6**

Second round
1	(Netherlands) **B Stöve** (Australia) **W Turnbull**	**6**	**6**
(United States) B Jordan (Australia) K Ruddell	4	2
(West Germany) B Bunge (United States) W White	1	3
(United States) **A Moulton** (United States) **M L Piatek**	**6**	**6**
8	(United States) K Jordan (United States) A Smith	6	1
(Italy) **D Porzio** (France) **F Thibault**	**7**	**6**
(United States) **D Desfor** (United States) **B Hallquist**	**6**	**6**
(United States) C Copeland (United States) H Ludloff	1	2

Third round
1	(Netherlands) **B Stöve** (Australia) **W Turnbull**	5	**6**	**6**
(United States) A Moulton (United States) M L Piatek	**7**	3	0
(Italy) D Porzio (France) F Thibault	4	3
(United States) **D Desfor** (United States) **B Hallquist**	**6**	**6**

Quarterfinals
1	(Netherlands) **B Stöve** (Australia) **W Turnbull**	3	**7**	**6**
(United States) D Desfor (United States) B Hallquist	**6**	6	3

==== Section 2 ====
First round
(Australia) **S Saliba** (Australia) **M Sawyer**	**6**	**7**
(Australia) W Gilchrist (New Zealand) B Perry	4	5
(New Zealand) J Chaloner (United States) J Nachand	**7**	5	5
(United States) **K Horvath** (United States) **S Mascarin**	5	**7**	**7**
6	(Australia) **D Fromholtz** (South Africa) **M Kruger**	3	**6**	**6**
(United States) A-M Fernandez (United States) S McInerney	**6**	3	1
(Japan) N Sato (Australia) P Whytcross	5	6
(Australia) **C Doerner** (United States) **L Forood**	**7**	**7**

Second round
3	(United States) **R Casals** (United States) **C Evert-Lloyd**	**6**	**6**
(Australia) S Saliba (Australia) M Sawyer	0	1
12	(United States) **B Nagelsen** (United States) **P Shriver**	**6**	**7**
(United States) K Horvath (United States) S Mascarin	3	6
6	(Australia) **D Fromholtz** (South Africa) **M Kruger**	**6**	**7**
(Argentina) R Giscafré (United States) J Stratton	0	6
(Australia) C Doerner (United States) L Forood	6	3
(United States) **F Hutnick** (United States) **B Norton**	**7**	**6**

Third round
3	(United States) **R Casals** (United States) **C Evert-Lloyd**	**6**	**7**
12	(United States) B Nagelsen (United States) P Shriver	3	6
6	(Australia) **D Fromholtz** (South Africa) **M Kruger**	**6**	**6**
(United States) F Hutnick (United States) B Norton	3	4

Quarterfinals
3	(United States) **R Casals** (United States) **C Evert-Lloyd**	**6**	**6**
6	(Australia) D Fromholtz (South Africa) M Kruger	3	3

=== Bottom half ===
==== Section 3 ====
First round
(Australia) **C O'Neil** (Sweden) **M Wikstedt**	**7**	**6**
(United States) L Allen (United States) R Fox	6	1
(United States) **S Acker** (United States) **J Anthony**	**6**	3	**7**
5	(France) F Dürr (United Kingdom) V Wade	1	**6**	6
(United States) M Louie (United States) M Redondo	3	1
11	(United States) **T Austin** (United States) **K May-Teacher**	**6**	**6**
(United States) **S Collins** (United States) **J DuVall**	**6**	2	**6**
4	(United Kingdom) S Barker (United States) A Kiyomura	2	**6**	3

Second round
(Canada) W Barlow (Australia) A Tobin	5	3
(Australia) **C O'Neil** (Sweden) **M Wikstedt**	**7**	**6**
(United States) B Bruning (United States) C Reynolds	5	**6**	5
(United States) **S Acker** (United States) **J Anthony**	**7**	4	**7**
(United States) M Carillo (United States) J Russell	2	**7**	2
11	(United States) **T Austin** (United States) **K May-Teacher**	**6**	6	**6**
(South Africa) **B Cuypers** (South Africa) **Y Vermaak**	**7**	**7**
(United States) S Collins (United States) J DuVall	6	5

Third round
(Australia) C O'Neil (Sweden) M Wikstedt	6	0
(United States) **S Acker** (United States) **J Anthony**	**7**	**6**
11	(United States) **T Austin** (United States) **K May-Teacher**	**7**	6	**6**
(South Africa) B Cuypers (South Africa) Y Vermaak	5	**7**	1

Quarterfinals
(United States) **S Acker** (United States) **J Anthony**	**w/o**
11	(United States) T Austin (United States) K May-Teacher

==== Section 4 ====
First round
(United States) **P Johnson** (United States) **P Smith**	**6**	**6**
(United States) M Louie (Chile) S Urroz	3	2
(South Africa) R Fairbank (United States) K Feldman	3	3
7	(South Africa) **I Kloss** (United States) **B-A Stuart**	**6**	**6**
(South Africa) T Harford (United Kingdom) A Hobbs	3	**6**	2
10	(Czechoslovakia) **R Maršíková** (Czechoslovakia) **R Tomanová**	**6**	1	**6**
(United States) D Morrison (United States) A Whitmore	6	**6**	6
(United States) **L Antonoplis** (Australia) **D Evers**	**7**	4	**7**

Second round
(United States) **P Johnson** (United States) **P Smith**	**6**	**6**
(United States) K Mcdaniel (United States) N Yeargin	4	2
(United Kingdom) J Durie (United Kingdom) D Jevans	1	2
7	(South Africa) **I Kloss** (United States) **B-A Stuart**	**6**	**6**
(United States) S Margolin (South Africa) G Stevens	6	2
10	(Czechoslovakia) **R Maršíková** (Czechoslovakia) **R Tomanová**	**7**	**6**
(United States) L Antonoplis (Australia) D Evers	5	2
2	(United States) **BJ King** (Czechoslovakia) **M Navratilova**	**7**	**6**

Third round
(United States) **P Johnson** (United States) **P Smith**	**6**	**7**
7	(South Africa) I Kloss (United States) B-A Stuart	4	5
10	(Czechoslovakia) R Maršíková (Czechoslovakia) R Tomanová
2	(United States) **BJ King** (Czechoslovakia) **M Navratilova**	**w/o**

Quarterfinals
(United States) P Johnson (United States) P Smith	1	3
2	(United States) **BJ King** (Czechoslovakia) **M Navratilova**	**6**	**6**

== Sources ==
- 1979 US Open – Women's draws and results at the International Tennis Federation
