= 1979 Australian Open – Men's doubles =

Men's doubles
- 1979 Australian Open

Final
- Champions: (Australia) Peter McNamara (Australia) Paul McNamee
- Runners-up: (Australia) Paul Kronk (Australia) Cliff Letcher
- Score: 7–6, 6–2

Details
- Draw: 32
- Seeds: 8

Events
Singles	men	women		boys	girls
Doubles	men	women	mixed	boys	girls
WC Singles	men	women	quad
WC Doubles	men	women	quad
Legends	men	women	mixed
- Australian Open

Wojciech Fibak and Kim Warwick were the defending champions.

== Seeds ==
1. (United States) Hank Pfister / (United States) Sherwood Stewart (quarterfinals)
2. (Australia) Bob Carmichael / (Hungary) Balázs Taróczy (first round)
3. (Australia) Mark Edmondson / (Australia) John Marks (first round)
4. (Australia) Ross Case / (Australia) Geoff Masters (quarterfinals)
5. (Australia) Peter McNamara / (Australia) Paul McNamee (champion)
6. (United States) John Sadri / (United States) Tim Wilkison (semifinals)
7. (Australia) Colin Dibley / (Australia) Chris Kachel (quarterfinals)
8. (Australia) Syd Ball / (Australia) Kim Warwick (first round)

== Draw ==
Key

- Q = Qualifier
- WC = Wild card
- LL = Lucky loser
- Alt = Alternate
- ITF = ITF entry
- PR = Protected ranking
- SR = Special ranking
- SE = Special exempt
- JE = Junior exempt
- JR = Junior Accelerator Programme entrant
- CO = College Accelerator Programme entrant
- NG = Next Gen Accelerator Program entrant
- w/o = Walkover
- r = Retired
- d = Defaulted

=== Finals ===
Semifinals
6	(United States) John Sadri (United States) Tim Wilkison	2	4
(Australia) Paul Kronk (Australia) Cliff Letcher	6	6
(Australia) John James (Australia) Terry Rocavert	4	6	5
5	(Australia) Peter McNamara (Australia) Paul McNamee	6	4	7

Final
(Australia) Paul Kronk (Australia) Cliff Letcher	6	2
5	(Australia) Peter McNamara (Australia) Paul McNamee	7	6

=== Top half ===
First round
1	(United States) H Pfister (United States) S Stewart	6	5	6
(Australia) J Fitzgerald (Australia) W Pascoe	4	7	4
(Australia) S Docherty (New Zealand) C Lewis	6	6
(United States) J Austin (United States) D Siegler	3	4
(United States) P Rennert (United States) R Van't Hof	7	6
(Australia) G Braun (Australia) H Hansson	5	4
(United States) R Fisher (India) S Menon	6	6
6	(United States) J Sadri (United States) T Wilkison	7	7
4	(Australia) R Case (Australia) G Masters	5	7	6
(Australia) R Ruffels (New Zealand) R Simpson	7	6	2
(South Africa) R Moore (Australia) J Trickey	6	6
(Australia) C Johnstone (Australia) G Whitecross	4	4
(West Germany) T Fürst (West Germany) U Marten	6	7
(Australia) P Doohan (Australia) CA Miller	3	6
(Australia) P Kronk (Australia) C Letcher	6	6
8	(Australia) S Ball (Australia) K Warwick	3	4

Second round
1	(United States) H Pfister (United States) S Stewart	6	6
(Australia) S Docherty (New Zealand) C Lewis	2	4
(United States) P Rennert (United States) R Van't Hof	7	3	3
6	(United States) J Sadri (United States) T Wilkison	6	6	6
4	(Australia) R Case (Australia) G Masters	7	6
(South Africa) R Moore (Australia) J Trickey	5	3
(West Germany) T Fürst (West Germany) U Marten	1	2
(Australia) P Kronk (Australia) C Letcher	6	6

Quarterfinals
1	(United States) H Pfister (United States) S Stewart	4	6
6	(United States) J Sadri (United States) T Wilkison	6	7
4	(Australia) R Case (Australia) G Masters	6	4	2
(Australia) P Kronk (Australia) C Letcher	3	6	6

Semifinals
6	(United States) J Sadri (United States) T Wilkison	2	4
(Australia) P Kronk (Australia) C Letcher	6	6

=== Bottom half ===
First round
7	(Australia) C Dibley (Australia) C Kachel	7	6
(Australia) W Maher (Australia) N Phillips	6	3
(United States) C Delaney (United States) J Delaney	3	7	8
(Australia) D Carter (Australia) A Gardiner	6	5	6
(Australia) J James (Australia) T Rocavert	6	7
(United States) G Hardie (United States) F Mcnair	3	5
(Australia) V Eke (Australia) E Ewert	7	7
3	(Australia) M Edmondson (Australia) J Marks	6	5
5	(Australia) P McNamara (Australia) P McNamee	6	6
(Australia) P Campbell (United States) G Malin	4	3
(Australia) B Drewett (South Africa) D Schneider	7	2	8
(United States) B Maze (United States) M Mitchell	6	6	6
(Australia) D Collings (Australia) D Crealy	6	4	4
(Israel) S Glickstein (United States) S Krulevitz	3	6	6
(Austria) P Feigl (Australia) R Frawley	6	3	9
2	(Australia) B Carmichael (Hungary) B Taróczy	3	6	7

Second round
7	(Australia) C Dibley (Australia) C Kachel	3	6	6
(United States) C Delaney (United States) J Delaney	6	3	2
(Australia) J James (Australia) T Rocavert	6	7
(Australia) V Eke (Australia) E Ewert	3	6
5	(Australia) P McNamara (Australia) P McNamee	6	7
(Australia) B Drewett (South Africa) D Schneider	4	5
(Israel) S Glickstein (United States) S Krulevitz	4	4
(Austria) P Feigl (Australia) R Frawley	6	6

Quarterfinals
7	(Australia) C Dibley (Australia) C Kachel	4	6	6
(Australia) J James (Australia) T Rocavert	6	4	8
5	(Australia) P McNamara (Australia) P McNamee	6	6
(Austria) P Feigl (Australia) R Frawley	4	4

Semifinals
(Australia) J James (Australia) T Rocavert	4	6	5
5	(Australia) P McNamara (Australia) P McNamee	6	4	7
