= 1978 Australian Open =

- Date: 25 December – 3 January 1979
- Edition: 67th
- Category: Grand Slam (ITF)
- Surface: Grass
- Location: Melbourne, Victoria, Australia
- Venue: Kooyong Lawn Tennis Club

Champions

Men's singles
- (Argentina) Guillermo Vilas

Women's singles
- (Australia) Chris O'Neil

Men's doubles
- (Poland) Wojciech Fibak / (Australia) Kim Warwick

Women's doubles
- (United States) Betsy Nagelsen / (Czechoslovakia) Renáta Tomanová
- Australian Open

The 1978 Australian Open was a tennis tournament played on outdoor grass courts at the Kooyong Lawn Tennis Club in Melbourne, Australia and was held from 25 December 1978 to 3 January 1979. It was the 67th edition of the Australian Open and the fourth Grand Slam tournament of the year. The singles titles were won by Argentinian Guillermo Vilas and Australian Chris O'Neil.

== Seniors ==
=== Men's singles ===
(Argentina) Guillermo Vilas defeated (Australia) John Marks, 6–4, 6–4, 3–6, 6–3

• It was Vilas' 3rd career Grand Slam singles title and his 1st title at the Australian Open.

=== Women's singles ===
(Australia) Chris O'Neil defeated (United States) Betsy Nagelsen, 6–3, 7–6^{(7–3)}

• It was O'Neil's 1st and only career Grand Slam singles title.

=== Men's doubles ===
(Poland) Wojciech Fibak / (Australia) Kim Warwick defeated (Australia) Paul Kronk / (Australia) Cliff Letcher, 7–6, 7–5

• It was Fibak's only career Grand Slam doubles title.
• It was Warwick's 1st career Grand Slam doubles title.

=== Women's doubles ===
(United States) Betsy Nagelsen / (Czechoslovakia) Renáta Tomanová defeated (Japan) Naoko Sato / (Australia) Pam Whytcross, 7–5, 6–2

• It was Nagelsen's 1st career Grand Slam doubles title.
• It was Tomanová's 1st and only career Grand Slam doubles title.

=== Mixed doubles ===
This event was not held from 1970 until 1985.

Preceded by December 1977 Australian Open	Australian Open	Succeeded by 1979 Australian Open
Preceded by 1978 US Open	Grand Slams	Succeeded by 1979 French Open
