= 1978 Australian Open – Men's singles =

Men's singles
- 1978 Australian Open

Final
- Champion: (Argentina) Guillermo Vilas
- Runner-up: (Australia) John Marks
- Score: 6–4, 6–4, 3–6, 6–3

Details
- Draw: 64
- Seeds: 16

Events
Singles	men	women		boys	girls
Doubles	men	women	mixed	boys	girls
WC Singles	men	women	quad
WC Doubles	men	women	quad
Legends	men	women	mixed
- Australian Open

Guillermo Vilas defeated John Marks in the final, 6–4, 6–4, 3–6, 6–3 to win the men's singles tennis title at the 1978 Australian Open. It was his first Australian Open title and third major title overall.

Vitas Gerulaitis was the reigning champion, but did not compete this year.

This tournament marked the final major appearance of four-time champion and former world No. 1 Ken Rosewall; he was defeated in the third round by Peter Feigl.

== Seeds ==
The seeded players are listed below. Guillermo Vilas is the champion; others show the round in which they were eliminated.

1. (Argentina) Guillermo Vilas (champion)
2. (Argentina) José Luis Clerc (first round)
3. (United States) Arthur Ashe (semifinals)
4. (United States) Tim Gullikson (second round)
5. (Poland) Wojtek Fibak (third round)
6. (Australia) John Alexander (quarterfinals)
7. (Australia) Ken Rosewall (third round)
8. (United States) Victor Amaya (second round)
9. (United States) Hank Pfister (semifinals)
10. (France) Yannick Noah (first round)
11. (Australia) Tony Roche (quarterfinals)
12. (Austria) Peter Feigl (quarterfinals)
13. (Australia) Kim Warwick (third round)
14. (Australia) Geoff Masters (first round)
15. (South Africa) Bernard Mitton (second round)
16. (Australia) Allan Stone (third round)

== Draw ==
Key

- Q = Qualifier
- WC = Wild card
- LL = Lucky loser
- Alt = Alternate
- ITF = ITF entry
- PR = Protected ranking
- SR = Special ranking
- SE = Special exempt
- JE = Junior exempt
- JR = Junior Accelerator Programme entrant
- CO = College Accelerator Programme entrant
- NG = Next Gen Accelerator Program entrant
- w/o = Walkover
- r = Retired
- d = Defaulted

=== Finals ===
Quarterfinals
1	(Argentina) Guillermo Vilas	3	6	3	6	6
11	(Australia) Tony Roche	6	1	6	3	2
(Australia) Paul Kronk	5	3	3
9	(United States) Hank Pfister	7	6	6
12	(Austria) Peter Feigl	6	2	6	2	7
3	(United States) Arthur Ashe	4	6	4	6	9
6	(Australia) John Alexander	4	4	5
(Australia) John Marks	6	6	7

Semifinals
1	(Argentina) Guillermo Vilas	6	6	6
9	(United States) Hank Pfister	2	0	4
3	(United States) Arthur Ashe	4	2	6	6	7
(Australia) John Marks	6	6	2	1	9

Final
1	(Argentina) Guillermo Vilas	6	6	3	6
(Australia) John Marks	4	4	6	3

=== Section 1 ===
First round
1	(Argentina) G Vilas	6	6	6	7
(Australia) T Rocavert	3	7	3	6
(Australia) B Drewett	4	6	6	6
(Australia) R Ruffels	6	4	2	1
(Australia) M Edmondson	3	6	6	7
(New Zealand) B Fairlie	6	2	1	6
(United States) T Wilkison	3	2	3
16	(Australia) A Stone	6	6	6
11	(Australia) T Roche	6	6	6
(Romania) I Țiriac	3	0	3
(United States) G Hardie	6	6	6	6
(Australia) A Gardiner	7	2	4	1
Q	(Australia) D Collings	6	4	6	6
(France) G Moretton	4	6	4	3
(India) S Menon	6	6	2
8	(United States) V Amaya	7	7	6

Second round
1	(Argentina) G Vilas	6	6	6
(Australia) B Drewett	4	4	3
(Australia) M Edmondson	4	6	3	4
16	(Australia) A Stone	6	3	6	6
11	(Australia) T Roche	6	6	6
(United States) G Hardie	3	4	4
Q	(Australia) D Collings	6	3	6	7
8	(United States) V Amaya	4	6	3	6

Third round
1	(Argentina) G Vilas	6	6	6
16	(Australia) A Stone	4	4	4
11	(Australia) T Roche	6	6	6
Q	(Australia) D Collings	1	2	3

Quarterfinals
1	(Argentina) G Vilas	3	6	3	6	6
11	(Australia) T Roche	6	1	6	3	2

=== Section 2 ===
First round
4	(United States) T Gullikson	6	6	7
(Australia) P McNamee	2	2	6
(Australia) C Kachel	2	7	2	2
(Australia) P McNamara	6	5	6	6
Q	(United States) J DiLouie	6	6	6
(Australia) R Frawley	3	2	1
(Australia) P Kronk	7	2	6	6
14	(Australia) G Masters	5	6	3	1
9	(United States) H Pfister	6	6	6
(United Kingdom) J Smith	3	2	2
(United Kingdom) R Drysdale	3	2	4
(Australia) S Docherty	6	6	6
(Australia) D Carter	4	0	7	6	2
(Australia) J James	6	6	6	4	6
(Australia) D Whyte	4	1	2
5	(Poland) W Fibak	6	6	6

Second round
4	(United States) T Gullikson	2	3	6
(Australia) P McNamara	6	6	7
Q	(United States) J DiLouie	6	5	4	6	1
(Australia) P Kronk	2	7	6	4	6
9	(United States) H Pfister	7	6	4	3	8
(Australia) S Docherty	5	3	6	6	6
(Australia) J James	2	2	6	3
5	(Poland) W Fibak	6	6	4	6

Third round
(Australia) P McNamara	2	2	5
(Australia) P Kronk	6	6	7
9	(United States) H Pfister	6	7	6
5	(Poland) W Fibak	3	6	1

Quarterfinals
(Australia) P Kronk	5	3	3
9	(United States) H Pfister	7	6	6

=== Section 3 ===
First round
7	(Australia) K Rosewall	6	6	6
Q	(United States) C Stansbury	2	4	3
(United Kingdom) R Lewis	7	2	1	4
(United States) S Stewart	6	6	6	6
(Egypt) I El Shafei	7	4	3	7	7
(Australia) B Giltinan	6	6	6	6	9
(Australia) C Dibley	4	6	4	6
12	(Austria) P Feigl	6	1	6	7
13	(Australia) K Warwick	6	6	6
(France) C Freyss	4	4	4
(Australia) D Crealy	6	7	6
Q	(Australia) W Maher	4	5	3
(South Africa) R Moore	7	4	6	6
Q	(India) R Krishnan	5	6	2	2
(United States) B Kleege	3	3	6
3	(United States) A Ashe	6	6	7

Second round
7	(Australia) K Rosewall	2	7	7	7
(United States) S Stewart	6	6	5	6
(Australia) B Giltinan	2	6	5	1
12	(Austria) P Feigl	6	3	7	6
13	(Australia) K Warwick	7	6	6
(Australia) D Crealy	6	1	3
(South Africa) R Moore	4	4	3
3	(United States) A Ashe	6	6	6

Third round
7	(Australia) K Rosewall	6	6	5	4	8
12	(Austria) P Feigl	2	4	7	6	10
13	(Australia) K Warwick	6	2	5	6	3
3	(United States) A Ashe	2	6	7	4	6

Quarterfinals
12	(Austria) P Feigl	6	2	6	2	7
3	(United States) A Ashe	4	6	4	6	9

=== Section 4 ===
First round
6	(Australia) J Alexander	6	7	6
(Australia) P Campbell	4	6	4
(United States) DR Bohrnstedt	2	2	3
(New Zealand) R Simpson	6	6	6
Q	(United Kingdom) A Jarrett	2	3	2
(Australia) B Carmichael	6	6	6
(Australia) C Letcher	3	3	7	1
15	(South Africa) B Mitton	6	6	5	6
10	(France) Y Noah	6	6	3	3	1
(Australia) R Case	4	4	6	6	6
(United States) J Sadri	6	7	6
Q	(Australia) N Phillips	3	6	4
(Australia) P Dent	7	2	1	6	6
(France) P Portes	6	6	6	2	1
(Australia) J Marks	6
2	(Argentina) JL Clerc	7	r.

Second round
6	(Australia) J Alexander	6	6	6
(New Zealand) R Simpson	3	3	4
(Australia) B Carmichael	6	2	7	6
15	(South Africa) B Mitton	4	6	6	3
(Australia) R Case	1	4	1
(United States) J Sadri	6	6	6
(Australia) P Dent	7	3	2	2
(Australia) J Marks	6	6	6	6

Third round
6	(Australia) J Alexander	6	6	6
(Australia) B Carmichael	3	2	2
(United States) J Sadri	2	2	6	4
(Australia) J Marks	6	6	4	6

Quarterfinals
6	(Australia) J Alexander	4	4	5
(Australia) J Marks	6	6	7

Preceded by 1978 US Open	Grand Slam men's singles	Succeeded by 1979 French Open
