= Mimmi Wikstedt =

Swedish tennis player (1954–2019)

- Full name: Marie Wikstedt
- Country (sports): Sweden
- Born: 30 April 1954 Stockholm, Sweden
- Died: 9 June 2019 (aged 65) Båstad, Sweden
- Retired: 1984

Singles

Grand Slam singles results
- Australian Open: 2R (1974)
- French Open: 1R (1973, 1974, 1978)
- Wimbledon: 3R (1979)
- US Open: 1R (1976, 1977, 1978, 1979)

Doubles
- Career titles: 1 WTA

Grand Slam doubles results
- Australian Open: QF (1979)
- French Open: 2R (1979)
- Wimbledon: QF (1977)
- US Open: 3R (1979)

Marie "Mimmi" Wikstedt (30 April 1954 – 9 June 2019) was a professional tennis player from Sweden.

== Biography ==
Wikstedt, who was known by her nickname "Mimmi", was born in Stockholm. She began competing in the early 1970s and made her debut for the Sweden Fed Cup team in 1973. Most of her Fed Cup matches came in doubles.

Her best grand slam performances came on the grass courts at Wimbledon. She made the mixed doubles quarter-finals with Ernie Ewert in 1975, won the Wimbledon Plate in 1976, reached the women's doubles quarter-finals with Jane Stratton in 1977 and made the third round of the singles in 1979. At the 1979 Australian Open she was quarter-finalist in the women's doubles partnering Renata Tomanova.

From the late 1970s she competed on the WTA Tour, most prominently as a doubles player. Her best performance in singles was a semi-final appearance at the 1978 Christchurch International. She won the doubles title at the 1982 Avon Championships of Nashville with Chris O'Neil.

She made her last Fed Cup appearance for Sweden in 1981 and finished with an 11/10 overall record, from 18 ties.

While living in Båstad, Wikstedt remained involved in tennis as a coach. She died in Båstad on 9 June 2019 after a long illness.

== WTA Tour finals ==
=== Doubles (1–1) ===
Result	W/L	Date	Tournament	Surface	Partners	Opponents	Score
Win	1–0	Jul 1976	Kitzbühel, Austria	Clay	(Sweden) Helena Anliot	(Germany) Katja Ebbinghaus (Germany) Heidi Eisterlehner	6–4, 2–6, 7–5
Loss	1–1	Aug 1979	Toronto, Canada	Hard	(Australia) Chris O'Neil	(United States) Lea Antonoplis (Australia) Diane Evers	6–2, 1–6, 3–6
