= 1979 Australian Open – Women's doubles =

Women's doubles
- 1979 Australian Open

Final
- Champions: (New Zealand) Judy Chaloner (Australia) Dianne Evers
- Runners-up: (Australia) Leanne Harrison (Netherlands) Marcella Mesker
- Score: 6–2, 1–6, 6–0

Details
- Draw: 16
- Seeds: 4

Events
Singles	men	women		boys	girls
Doubles	men	women	mixed	boys	girls
WC Singles	men	women	quad
WC Doubles	men	women	quad
Legends	men	women	mixed
- Australian Open

Betsy Nagelsen and Renáta Tomanová were the defending champions.

== Seeds ==
1. (United States) Barbara Jordan / (Australia) Kym Ruddell (quarterfinals)
2. (Czechoslovakia) Renáta Tomanová / (Sweden) Mimmi Wikstedt (quarterfinals)
3. (New Zealand) Judy Chaloner / (Australia) Dianne Evers (champions)
4. (Australia) Cynthia Doerner / (United States) Sharon Walsh (quarterfinals)

== Draw ==
Key

- Q = Qualifier
- WC = Wild card
- LL = Lucky loser
- Alt = Alternate
- ITF = ITF entry
- PR = Protected ranking
- SR = Special ranking
- SE = Special exempt
- JE = Junior exempt
- JR = Junior Accelerator Programme entrant
- CO = College Accelerator Programme entrant
- NG = Next Gen Accelerator Program entrant
- w/o = Walkover
- r = Retired
- d = Defaulted

First round
1	(United States) B Jordan (Australia) K Ruddell	6	7
(Australia) C Draper (Australia) G Stirton	3	6
(Australia) J Dimond (Canada) L Senn	1	1
(Australia) E Little (Australia) K Pratt	6	6
4	(Australia) C Doerner (United States) S Walsh	7	6
(Australia) N Gregory (Belgium) M Gurdal	6	3
(Australia) L Harrison (Netherlands) M Mesker	3	6	6
(Australia) L Cassell (Australia) S Leo	6	3	3
(Australia) S Saliba (Australia) M Sawyer	6	7
(Japan) N Sato (Australia) P Whytcross	4	5
(Australia) K Hallam (Australia) C Griffiths	0	2
3	(New Zealand) J Chaloner (Australia) D Evers	6	6
(Australia) D Freeman (Australia) K Gulley	2	5
(New Zealand) C Newton (Australia) J Walker	6	7
(Australia) B Catton (Australia) A Minter	3	6
2	(Czechoslovakia) R Tomanová (Sweden) M Wikstedt	6	7

Quarterfinals
1	(United States) B Jordan (Australia) K Ruddell	6	2	6
(Australia) E Little (Australia) K Pratt	2	6	8
4	(Australia) C Doerner (United States) S Walsh	6	2
(Australia) L Harrison (Netherlands) M Mesker	7	6
(Australia) S Saliba (Australia) M Sawyer	1	6	2
3	(New Zealand) J Chaloner (Australia) D Evers	6	3	6
(New Zealand) C Newton (Australia) J Walker	6	6
2	(Czechoslovakia) R Tomanová (Sweden) M Wikstedt	2	2

Semifinals
(Australia) E Little (Australia) K Pratt	2	6
(Australia) L Harrison (Netherlands) M Mesker	6	7
3	(New Zealand) J Chaloner (Australia) D Evers	3	6	10
(New Zealand) C Newton (Australia) J Walker	6	1	8

Final
(Australia) L Harrison (Netherlands) M Mesker	2	6	0
3	(New Zealand) J Chaloner (Australia) D Evers	6	1	6
