= 1979 US Open – Women's singles =

Women's singles
- 1979 US Open

Final
- Champion: (United States) Tracy Austin
- Runner-up: (United States) Chris Evert
- Score: 6–4, 6–3

Details
- Draw: 96
- Seeds: 16

Events
Singles	men	women		boys	girls
Doubles	men	women	mixed	boys	girls
WC Singles	men	women	quad
WC Doubles	men	women	quad
Legends	men	women	mixed
- US Open

Tracy Austin defeated four-time defending champion Chris Evert in the final, 6–4, 6–3 to win the women's singles tennis title at the 1979 US Open. It was her first major singles title. Austin became the youngest major champion in the Open Era, aged 16 years and 9 months (a record later surpassed by Monica Seles at the 1990 French Open, and one that still stands at the US Open). She was also the youngest woman to defeat the world No. 1 and No. 2 at one tournament since the WTA rankings were established in 1975, a record that still stands.

In Evert’s fourth-round match against Sherry Acker, Evert lost the first set. This marked her first set lost at the US Open since the opening set of the 1975 US Open final against Evonne Goolagong-Cawley, a span of 46 consecutive sets won.

== Seeds ==
The seeded players are listed below. Tracy Austin is the champion; others show the round in which they were eliminated.

1. (United States) Chris Evert-Lloyd (runner-up)
2. (United States) Martina Navratilova (semifinalist)
3. (United States) Tracy Austin (champion)
4. (United Kingdom) Virginia Wade (quarterfinalist)
5. (Australia) Evonne Goolagong (quarterfinalist)
6. (Australia) Dianne Fromholtz (fourth round)
7. (Australia) Wendy Turnbull (third round)
8. (Australia) Kerry Melville Reid (quarterfinalist)
9. (United States) Billie Jean King (semifinalist)
10. (South Africa) Greer Stevens (fourth round)
11. (United States) Kathy Jordan (fourth round)
12. (Czechoslovakia) Regina Maršíková (fourth round)
13. (United Kingdom) Sue Barker (second round)
14. (United States) Pam Shriver (first round)
15. (United States) Ann Kiyomura (second round)
16. (Netherlands) Betty Stöve (second round)

== Draw ==
=== Key ===
- Q = Qualifier
- WC = Wild card
- LL = Lucky loser
- r = Retired

=== Finals ===
Quarterfinals
1	(United States) Chris Evert	7	6
5	(Australia) Evonne Goolagong	5	2
4	(United Kingdom) Virginia Wade	3	6
9	(United States) Billie Jean King	6	7
(West Germany) Sylvia Hanika	1	1
3	(United States) Tracy Austin	6	6
8	(Australia) Kerry Melville Reid	4	1
2	(United States) Martina Navratilova	6	6

Semifinals
1	(United States) Chris Evert	6	6
9	(United States) Billie Jean King	1	0
3	(United States) Tracy Austin	7	7
2	(United States) Martina Navratilova	5	5

Finals
1	(United States) Chris Evert	4	3
3	(United States) Tracy Austin	6	6

=== Earlier rounds ===
==== Section 1 ====
First round
1	(United States) Chris Evert	6	6
(West Germany) Iris Riedel	0	0
(United States) Renée Richards	7	6
(United States) Mary Carillo	5	3
(United States) Sherry Acker	6	6
(United States) Dana Gilbert	3	3
Q	(United States) Kelly Henry	6	6
(Argentina) Emilse Raponi	3	4

Second round
1	(United States) Evert	6	6
(United States) JoAnne Russell	0	2
(South Africa) Yvonne Vermaak	2	6	4
(United States) Richards	6	2	6
(United States) Lele Forood	6	4	5
(United States) Acker	3	6	7
Q	(United States) Henry	7	4
16	(Netherlands) Betty Stöve	6	1	r

Third round
1	(United States) Evert	6	6
(United States) Richards	2	1
(United States) Acker	6	6
Q	(United States) Henry	4	1

Fourth round
1	(United States) Evert	4	6	6
(United States) Acker	6	0	2

==== Section 2 ====
First round
Q	(United States) Julie Harrington	6	6
14	(United States) Pam Shriver	4	1
(United States) Jeanne DuVall	6	7
(West Germany) Bettina Bunge	4	5
Q	(United States) Trey Lewis	7	5	6
(United States) Renee Blount	6	7	4
5	(Australia) Evonne Goolagong	6	6	6
(United States) Kay McDaniel	7	4	4

Second round
Q	(United States) Harrington	6	6
(United States) Peanut Louie Harper	2	2
(United States) Nancy Yeargin	2	0
(United States) DuVall	6	6
(Italy) Sabina Simmonds	7	7
Q	(United States) Lewis	6	6
(United States) Rayni Fox	2	3
5	(Australia) Goolagong	6	6

Third round
Q	(United States) Harrington	4	6	2
(United States) DuVall	6	3	6
(Italy) Simmonds	5	1
5	(Australia) Goolagong	7	6

Fourth round
(United States) DuVall	3	6	0
5	(Australia) Goolagong	6	3	6

==== Section 3 ====
First round
4	(United Kingdom) Virginia Wade	6	6
(United States) Paula Smith	3	3
(United States) Diane Morrison	6	6
(United States) Linda Siegel	0	1
(United States) Barbara Jordan	6	6
Q	(United States) Susan Mascarin	0	3
(Socialist Federal Republic of Yugoslavia) Mima Jaušovec	6	6	6
(Netherlands) Elly Vessies	7	2	2

Second round
4	(United Kingdom) Wade	6	6
(United States) Janet Newberry	3	2
Q	(Australia) Amanda Tobin	2	2
(United States) Morrison	6	6
(United States) Julie Anthony	5	4
(United States) B. Jordan	7	6
(Socialist Federal Republic of Yugoslavia) Jaušovec	3	3
12	(Czechoslovakia) Regina Maršíková	6	6

Third round
4	(United Kingdom) Wade	6	7
(United States) Morrison	1	6
(United States) B. Jordan	6	2	3
12	(Czechoslovakia) Maršíková	4	6	6

Fourth round
4	(United Kingdom) Wade
12	(Czechoslovakia) Maršíková	w/o

==== Section 4 ====
First round
9	(United States) Billie Jean King	6	7
(United States) Zenda Liess	3	5
(South Africa) Tanya Harford	7	6
(United States) Marita Redondo	6	1
(United States) Kathy May Teacher	7	6
Q	(United States) Heather Ludloff	6	1
7	(Australia) Wendy Turnbull	4	6	6
(Hungary) Marie Neumannová Pinterová	6	3	4

Second round
9	(United States) King	6	6
(Australia) Chris O'Neil	0	3
(South Africa) Harford	3	1
(United States) Stacy Margolin	6	6
(United States) May Teacher	6	6
(Italy) Daniela Porzio	1	2
(United States) Anna-Maria Fernandez	4	2
7	(Australia) Turnbull	6	6

Third round
9	(United States) King	6	6
(United States) Margolin	3	3
(United States) May Teacher	7	6
7	(Australia) Turnbull	5	2

Fourth round
9	(United States) King	6	6
(United States) May Teacher	3	0

==== Section 5 ====
First round
6	(Australia) Dianne Fromholtz	6	6
(Australia) Diane Evers	3	2
(United States) Leslie Allen	6	6
(United States) Sandy Collins	3	4
(West Germany) Sylvia Hanika	1	6	6
(United States) Betsy Nagelsen	6	3	2
15	(United States) Ann Kiyomura	6	6
(United States) Beth Norton	4	1

Second round
6	(Australia) Fromholtz	7	6
Q	(United States) Kathy Horvath	6	2
(United States) Ruta Gerulaitis	6	4
(United States) Allen	7	6
(West Germany) Hanika	6	6	6
(United States) Lea Antonoplis	2	7	4
(United States) Laura duPont	7	5
15	(United States) Kiyomura	5	4	r

Third round
6	(Australia) Fromholtz	6	6	6
(United States) Allen	7	3	2
(West Germany) Hanika	6	6	6
(United States) duPont	4	7	3

Fourth round
6	(Australia) Fromholtz	7	4	4
(West Germany) Hanika	6	6	6

==== Section 6 ====
First round
11	(United States) Kathy Jordan	6	6
(United States) Betty-Ann Stuart	4	0
(Romania) Florența Mihai	6	7
(Sweden) Mimmi Wikstedt	3	5
(United States) Kate Latham	6	6
(United States) Pam Teeguarden	4	2
3	(United States) Tracy Austin	6	6
(Argentina) Ivanna Madruga	3	1

Second round
11	(United States) K. Jordan	5	6	6
(United States) Andrea Whitmore	7	3	1
(Romania) Mihai	6	1	r
(United States) Wendy White	4	3
(United States) Latham	6	6	6
(United States) Karen Hantze Susman	4	7	2
(United States) Andrea Jaeger	2	2
3	(United States) Austin	6	6

Third round
11	(United States) K. Jordan	6	6
(United States) White	2	1
(United States) Latham	3	0
3	(United States) Austin	6	6

Fourth round
11	(United States) K. Jordan	6	1	6
3	(United States) Austin	4	6	7

==== Section 7 ====
First round
8	(Australia) Kerry Melville Reid	6	6
(United States) Rosemary Casals	1	2
(South Africa) Ilana Kloss	6	3	6
(Australia) Cynthia Doerner	4	6	4
(United States) Anne Smith	6	6
(France) Gail Lovera	2	3
(United States) Barbara Potter	6	6
(United States) Diane Desfor	3	4

Second round
8	(Australia) Melville Reid	6	6
(United Kingdom) Anne Hobbs	4	0
(South Africa) Kloss	3	2
(United States) Mary Lou Piatek	6	6
(United States) A. Smith	6	6
(Czechoslovakia) Renáta Tomanová	2	4
(United States) Potter	6	4	6
13	(United Kingdom) Sue Barker	2	6	1

Third round
8	(Australia) Melville Reid	4	6	6
(United States) Piatek	6	3	4
(United States) A. Smith	3	6	6
(United States) Potter	6	4	4

Fourth round
8	(Australia) Melville Reid	4	7	7
(United States) A. Smith	6	5	6

==== Section 8 ====
First round
Q	(South Africa) Rosalyn Fairbank	4	6	6
(United States) Marcie Louie	6	0	4
(United States) Terry Holladay	6	6
(United States) Sharon Walsh	2	3
(Czechoslovakia) Hana Mandlíková	6	6
(France) Françoise Dürr	1	1
(United States) Alycia Moulton	7	4	6
(South Africa) Brigitte Cuypers	5	6	3

Second round
10	(South Africa) Greer Stevens	6	3	6
Q	(South Africa) Fairbank	2	6	0
(United States) Barbara Hallquist	3	6	3
(United States) Holladay	6	4	6
(Czechoslovakia) Mandlíková	6	4
(United States) Caroline Stoll	7	6
(United States) Moulton	4	0
2	(United States) Martina Navratilova	6	6

Third round
10	(South Africa) Stevens	6	6
(United States) Holladay	4	0
(United States) Stoll	3	1
2	(United States) Navratilova	6	6

Fourth round
10	(South Africa) Stevens	2	2
2	(United States) Navratilova	6	6

Preceded by 1979 Wimbledon Championships – Women's singles	Grand Slam women's singles	Succeeded by 1979 Australian Open – Women's singles
