= 1979 Australian Open – Men's singles =

Men's singles
- 1979 Australian Open

Final
- Champion: (Argentina) Guillermo Vilas
- Runner-up: (United States) John Sadri
- Score: 7–6^{(7–4)}, 6–3, 6–2

Details
- Draw: 64
- Seeds: 16

Events
Singles	men	women		boys	girls
Doubles	men	women	mixed	boys	girls
WC Singles	men	women	quad
WC Doubles	men	women	quad
Legends	men	women	mixed
- Australian Open

Defending champion Guillermo Vilas defeated John Sadri in the final, 7–6^{(7–4)}, 6–3, 6–2 to win the men's singles tennis title at the 1979 Australian Open. It was his second Australian Open title and fourth and last major singles title overall.

== Seeds ==
The seeded players are listed below. Guillermo Vilas is the champion; others show the round in which they were eliminated.

1. (Argentina) Guillermo Vilas (champion)
2. (Australia) John Alexander (first round)
3. (United States) Victor Amaya (semifinals)
4. (United States) Hank Pfister (first round)
5. (Hungary) Balázs Taróczy (first round)
6. (United States) John Sadri (final)
7. (United States) Tim Wilkison (first round)
8. (Austria) Peter Feigl (first round)
9. (Australia) Peter McNamara (third round)
10. (Australia) Kim Warwick (third round)
11. (United States) Peter Rennert (quarterfinals)
12. (Australia) Geoff Masters (second round)
13. (Australia) Phil Dent (quarterfinals)
14. (Australia) Ross Case (first round)
15. (Australia) Rod Frawley (quarterfinals)
16. (Australia) Paul McNamee (third round)

== Draw ==
Key

- Q = Qualifier
- WC = Wild card
- LL = Lucky loser
- Alt = Alternate
- ITF = ITF entry
- PR = Protected ranking
- SR = Special ranking
- SE = Special exempt
- JE = Junior exempt
- JR = Junior Accelerator Programme entrant
- CO = College Accelerator Programme entrant
- NG = Next Gen Accelerator Program entrant
- w/o = Walkover
- r = Retired
- d = Defaulted

=== Finals ===
Quarterfinals
1	(Argentina) Guillermo Vilas	6	3	7	4	6
13	(Australia) Phil Dent	2	6	6	6	2
3	(United States) Victor Amaya	7	6	6
11	(United States) Peter Rennert	6	4	4
6	(United States) John Sadri	7	6	6	6
15	(Australia) Rod Frawley	6	3	7	4
(Australia) Mark Edmondson	6	4	6	6	4
(Australia) Colin Dibley	3	6	3	7	6

Semifinals
1	(Argentina) Guillermo Vilas	7	3	7	7
3	(United States) Victor Amaya	5	6	6	6
6	(United States) John Sadri	6	7	6	6
(Australia) Colin Dibley	4	6	7	4

Final
1	(Argentina) Guillermo Vilas	7	6	6
6	(United States) John Sadri	6	3	2

=== Top half ===
==== Section 1 ====
First round
1	(Argentina) G Vilas	7	6	6
(New Zealand) C Lewis	5	3	4
Q	(Australia) A Gardiner	6	3	6	6
(Australia) N Phillips	4	6	4	4
(United States) C Delaney	7	6	7
LL	(United States) J Delaney	5	4	5
(Australia) B Drewett	6	1	4	5
9	(Australia) P McNamara	3	6	6	7
13	(Australia) P Dent	6	6	6
(Australia) J Marks	3	2	2
LL	(United States) J Cohen	4	6	4	5
(Australia) CA Miller	6	3	6	7
(Australia) C Kachel	7	6	6
LL	(Australia) C Fancutt	6	2	1
(Australia) P Kronk	6	6	2	6
8	(Austria) P Feigl	3	4	6	3

Second round
1	(Argentina) G Vilas	6	6	6
Q	(Australia) A Gardiner	4	2	4
(United States) C Delaney	3	6	3
9	(Australia) P McNamara	6	7	6
13	(Australia) P Dent	7	6	6
(Australia) CA Miller	6	0	3
(Australia) C Kachel	7	6	6
(Australia) P Kronk	6	2	1

Third round
1	(Argentina) G Vilas	6	6	6
9	(Australia) P McNamara	3	4	4
13	(Australia) P Dent	6	6	4	6
(Australia) C Kachel	4	1	6	4

Quarterfinals
1	(Argentina) G Vilas	6	3	7	4	6
13	(Australia) P Dent	2	6	6	6	2

==== Section 2 ====
First round
3	(United States) V Amaya	6	6	6
(United States) S Stewart	3	4	1
(Australia) D Carter	6	6	6
(Australia) D Collings	2	3	2
Q	(Australia) W Hampson	3	4	4
(New Zealand) R Simpson	6	6	6
(India) S Menon	2	6	7	5	0
16	(Australia) P McNamee	6	4	5	7	6
11	(United States) P Rennert	6	7	6
Q	(Australia) J Trickey	3	6	4
(Australia) C Letcher	6	6	6	5	6
Q	(West Germany) U Marten	4	1	7	7	8
(Australia) J Fitzgerald	2	6	3
(Australia) S Docherty	6	7	6
(United States) S Krulevitz	6	6	3	6
5	(Hungary) B Taróczy	3	4	6	3

Second round
3	(United States) V Amaya	3	6	7	6
(Australia) D Carter	6	3	6	3
(New Zealand) R Simpson	5	4	4
16	(Australia) P McNamee	7	6	6
11	(United States) P Rennert	6	5	6	6
Q	(West Germany) U Marten	2	7	3	1
(Australia) S Docherty	4	4	3
(United States) S Krulevitz	6	6	6

Third round
3	(United States) V Amaya	7	6	7
16	(Australia) P McNamee	6	3	6
11	(United States) P Rennert	6	7	6
(United States) S Krulevitz	4	5	1

Quarterfinals
3	(United States) V Amaya	7	6	6
11	(United States) P Rennert	6	4	4

=== Bottom half ===
==== Section 3 ====
First round
6	(United States) J Sadri	6	6	6
(Australia) P Doohan	3	3	4
(Australia) T Rocavert	5	6	2	1
(South Africa) R Moore	7	4	6	6
Q	(Australia) R Ruffels	1	2	3
(Australia) J James	6	6	6
(Australia) B Carmichael	1	6	2	0
10	(Australia) K Warwick	6	4	6	6
15	(Australia) R Frawley	6	3	6	6	6
(Australia) C Johnstone	1	6	7	4	4
(United States) G Malin	6	6	6
(United States) F McNair	4	2	4
(United States) B Maze	7	1	7	6
(Australia) G Whitecross	6	6	6	4
Q	(Australia) S Ball	7	4	6	6
4	(United States) H Pfister	5	6	4	3

Second round
6	(United States) J Sadri	6	6	6
(South Africa) R Moore	4	4	3
(Australia) J James	3	3	0
10	(Australia) K Warwick	6	6	6
15	(Australia) R Frawley	6	6	6	6
(United States) G Malin	7	2	0	4
(United States) B Maze	3	3	4
Q	(Australia) S Ball	6	6	6

Third round
6	(United States) J Sadri	3	4	6	6	9
10	(Australia) K Warwick	6	6	3	2	7
15	(Australia) R Frawley	6	7	6
Q	(Australia) S Ball	2	6	3

Quarterfinals
6	(United States) J Sadri	7	6	6	6
15	(Australia) R Frawley	6	3	7	4

==== Section 4 ====
First round
7	(United States) T Wilkison	6	6	5
(Australia) W Maher	7	7	7
Q	(Israel) S Glickstein	7	6	6
(United States) G Hardie	5	4	2
(United States) M Mitchell	6	4	6	6
(United States) D Siegler	3	6	3	4
(Australia) M Edmondson	6	6	6	6
14	(Australia) R Case	7	3	1	1
12	(Australia) G Masters	6	6	1	3	6
(South Africa) D Schneider	3	2	6	6	3
Q	(Australia) P Davies	5	3	3
(Australia) T Roche	7	6	6
(Australia) C Dibley	7	5	6	6
(United States) J Austin	5	7	3	1
(United States) R Fisher	7	7	6
2	(Australia) J Alexander	6	6	4

Second round
(Australia) W Maher	6	7	6	6	10
Q	(Israel) S Glickstein	7	5	7	4	8
(United States) M Mitchell	2	2	1
(Australia) M Edmondson	6	6	6
12	(Australia) G Masters	5	2	6
(Australia) T Roche	7	6	7
(Australia) C Dibley	6	3	6	6	7
(United States) R Fisher	8	6	3	3	5

Third round
(Australia) W Maher	6	3	4
(Australia) M Edmondson	7	6	6
(Australia) T Roche	4	7	6	3	4
(Australia) C Dibley	6	6	3	6	6

Quarterfinals
(Australia) M Edmondson	6	4	6	6	4
(Australia) C Dibley	3	6	3	7	6

Preceded by 1979 US Open	Grand Slam men's singles	Succeeded by 1980 French Open
