= Mary Sawyer (tennis) =

Australian tennis player

- Full name: Mary Sawyer
- Country (sports): Australia
- Born: 11 June 1957 (age 68)

Singles

Grand Slam singles results
- Australian Open: SF (1979)

Doubles

Grand Slam doubles results
- Australian Open: QF (1978, 1979)
- Wimbledon: 2R (1977, 1978)
- US Open: 2R (1979)

Mary Sawyer (born 11 June 1957) is a former professional tennis player from Australia.

== Biography ==
Sawyer comes from Perth and is of Irish descent, with her father being an immigrant from Ireland. A two-time winner of the Irish Open, Sawyer beat former Wimbledon and US Open champion Maria Bueno in the 1977 final, then won the event again the following year.

Her most notable performance was a semi-final appearance at the 1979 Australian Open. Previously twice a quarterfinalist, she began the tournament with a first round upset over top-seeded Virginia Ruzici. This was the first occasion that a number one seed had been beaten in the opening round of the women's singles at a Grand Slam. She then defeated Naoko Sato and seventh-seeded Janet Newberry, then lost in the semifinals to Sharon Walsh.

After the 1979 Australian Open, Sawyer took a break from tennis, which she had planned before her tournament run. She had announced that she wanted to spend more time at home in Perth, having only been there for three months out of the last five years. The break turned out to be permanent as she never returned to the tour.

== WTA Tour finals ==
=== Doubles (0–1) ===
Result	Date	Tournament	Tier	Surface	Partner	Opponents	Score
Loss	Oct 1979	Borden Classic, Japan	Colgate Series	Carpet	(Australia) Sue Saliba	(China) Chen Chuan (China) Yu Liqiao	0–6, 6–7
