= Alvin Gardiner =

Australian tennis player

- Full name: Alvin Gardiner
- Country (sports): Australia
- Born: 11 February 1951 (age 75) Tara, Queensland, Australia

Singles
- Career record: 26–82
- Career titles: 0
- Highest ranking: No. 90 (31 December 1978)

Grand Slam singles results
- Australian Open: 2R (1970, 1979)
- French Open: 1R (1969, 1976, 1977, 1979)
- Wimbledon: 1R (1972, 1975, 1977, 1979)
- US Open: 2R (1976)

Doubles
- Career record: 25–77
- Career titles: 0

Grand Slam doubles results
- Australian Open: QF (1968)
- French Open: 3R (1969)
- Wimbledon: 2R (1980)
- US Open: 1R (1976, 1978, 1979)

Alvin Gardiner (born 11 February 1951) is a former professional tennis player from Australia.

== Career ==
Gardiner was a quarter-finalist in the men's doubles at the 1968 Australian Open with Ross Case.

He continued to compete in every Australian Open until 1973, when he began to suffer a series of injuries and illnesses. It started with a season ending collarbone injury, a break that required a bone graft operation in London. When he returned to action he caught glandular fever, in August 1974 he won the Exmouth Open, and then midway through the season he pulled a back muscle. He won the Exmouth Open singles title against Graeme Thomson in 1974 He made a comeback in 1975 and won the Irish Open that year, over Rhodesian player Tony Fawcett.

During his career he also featured in the French Open, Wimbledon and US Open tournaments. He was John McEnroe's first ever opponent in a Grand Slam singles main draw. They met in the first round of the 1977 French Open and the American qualifier won the match in straight sets. At the same tournament, Gardiner partnered Paul McNamee in the men's doubles. He made the second round of the Australian Open twice, the last of which was in 1979, when he lost to eventual champion Guillermo Vilas.

His highest doubles ranking was world No. 77, achieved on 16 April 1979.

After retiring from the professional tour, Gardiner competed in seniors tennis and won an ITF Seniors World Championship singles title.

== Personal life ==
Gardiner was born in Tara, Queensland, to Ann, a schoolteacher, and Fred, a grazier who became an artist known for his wood sculptures.

In his memoir, Gardiner states that he competed in around 65 countries, and that the nickname "Aussie Journeyman" was given to him by McEnroe.

He has coached at clubs in the United States, Australia and Germany, and coaches at the Range Tennis Club in Toowoomba.

In 2017 Gardiner published a book on his tennis career titled Aussie Journeyman: Memoir of a Touring Tennis Professional.
