= Elizabeth Little (tennis) =

Australian tennis player

- Country (sports): Australia
- Born: 3 October 1960 (age 65)

Grand Slam singles results
- Australian Open: 2R (1977, 1980)
- Wimbledon: 2R (1981)
- US Open: 1R (1981)

Grand Slam doubles results
- Australian Open: SF (1979)
- Wimbledon: 3R (1981)
- US Open: QF (1981)

Elizabeth Little (born 3 October 1960) is an Australian former professional tennis player. She competed three times at the Australian Open, once at Wimbledon, and once at the U.S. Open.

Little is the mother of professional tennis players John Peers and Sally Peers.

== Grand Slam tournaments Performance timeline ==
Key
W	F	SF	QF	#R	RR	Q#	DNQ	A	NH

(W) winner; (F) finalist; (SF) semifinalist; (QF) quarterfinalist; (#R) rounds 4, 3, 2, 1; (RR) round-robin stage; (Q#) qualification round; (DNQ) did not qualify; (A) absent; (NH) not held; (SR) strike rate (events won / competed); (W–L) win–loss record.

=== Singles ===
Tournament	1977		1978	1979	1980	1981	SR	W–L	Win %
Australian Open	A	2R		1R	2R		/	–	–
French Open							/	–	–
Wimbledon							/	–	–
US Open							/	–	–
Win–loss						/	–	–	

=== Doubles ===
Tournament	1977	1978	1979	1980	1981	SR	W–L	Win %
Australian Open			SF			/	–	–
French Open						/	–	–
Wimbledon					3R	/	–	–
US Open						/	–	–
Win–loss						/	–	–
