= Jenny Walker =

Australian tennis player

- Full name: Jennifer Walker
- Country (sports): Australia
- Born: 9 April 1956 (age 69)

Singles

Grand Slam singles results
- Australian Open: 2R (1974)
- French Open: 2R (1976)
- Wimbledon: 2R (1980)

Doubles

Grand Slam doubles results
- Australian Open: SF (1979)
- French Open: 1R (1980)
- Wimbledon: QF (1976)
- US Open: 1R (1974, 1980)

Grand Slam mixed doubles results
- Wimbledon: 3R (1976)

Jennifer Walker (born 9 April 1956) is an Australian former professional tennis player. She was the 1974 Australian Open junior champion.

Walker's best results in grand slam tennis came in doubles, with a quarter-final appearance at the 1976 Wimbledon Championships with Chris O'Neil and a semi-final appearance at the 1979 Australian Open partnering Chris Newton.
