= Rick Fisher (tennis) =

American tennis player

- Country (sports): United States
- Born: March 29, 1951 (age 73); Evanston, Illinois, U.S.
- Plays: Left-handed

Singles
- Career record: 36–98
- Career titles: 0
- Highest ranking: No. 113 (January 16, 1978)

Grand Slam singles results
- Australian Open: 2R (1979)
- French Open: 1R (1975, 1978)
- Wimbledon: 2R (1978)
- US Open: 2R (1978)

Doubles
- Career record: 38–95
- Career titles: 0

Grand Slam doubles results
- French Open: 2R (1970, 1975)
- Wimbledon: 2R (1978)
- US Open: 2R (1980)

Rick Fisher (born March 29, 1951) is a former professional tennis player from the United States.

== Career ==
Fisher played collegiate tennis at Stanford University and was an All-American in 1973.

At the 1978 Grand Prix Cleveland tournament, Fisher was runner-up in the doubles, with Bruce Manson. His best singles result on tour came in the 1979 Australian Hard Court Tennis Championships, where he was a semi-finalist.

He had an upset straight sets win over second seed John Alexander at the 1979 Australian Open.

== Grand Prix career finals ==
=== Doubles: 1 (0–1) ===
Result	W/L	Date	Tournament	Surface	Partner	Opponents	Score
Loss	0–1	Aug 1978	Cleveland, United States	Hard	(United States) Bruce Manson	(United States) Dick Stockton (United States) Erik van Dillen	1–6, 4–6
