= Terry Rocavert =

Australian tennis player

- Country (sports): Australia
- Born: 21 October 1955 (age 71) Balmain, New South Wales
- Height: 180 cm (5 ft 11 in)
- Plays: Right-handed

Singles
- Career record: 37–62
- Career titles: 0
- Highest ranking: No. 92 (05 May 1980)

Grand Slam singles results
- Australian Open: 1R (1977, 1978, 1979, 1980)
- French Open: 2R (1978, 1980)
- Wimbledon: 2R (1980)
- US Open: 2R (1979)

Doubles
- Career record: 21–49
- Career titles: 0

Grand Slam doubles results
- Australian Open: SF (1979)
- French Open: 2R (1978, 1980)
- Wimbledon: 1R (1978)
- US Open: 1R (1979)

Terry Rocavert (born 21 October 1955) is a former professional tennis player from Australia.

== Playing career ==
Rocavert is often known for his second round match against John McEnroe in the 1980 Wimbledon Championships. After defeating veteran Roger Taylor in the opening round, Rocavert faced the American and took a two sets to one lead. In the fourth set tiebreak, Rocavert went up a mini-break when McEnroe double faulted and recalled that he "started thinking of the consequences of winning, what they might ask me at the press conference". He lost the tiebreak and then the fifth set, 3–6.

He was a semi-finalist in the men's doubles at the 1979 Australian Open, with partner John James.

Rocavert was runner-up to Bob Lutz at the 1980 Columbus Open. En route to the final he defeated Ilie Năstase. He also made the semi-finals in Hobart that year.

== Coaching ==
From 1980 to 1989, Rocavert was the New South Wales state coach. He now coaches in Birchgrove.

== Family ==
He is the son of Don Rocavert, who competed at the Australian Championships in 1947 and 1951.

== Grand Prix career finals ==
=== Singles: 1 (0–1) ===
Result	W–L	Date	Tournament	Surface	Opponent	Score
Loss	0–1	Aug 1980	Columbus, United States	Hard	(United States) Bob Lutz	4–6, 3–6
