= Chris Newton (tennis) =

New Zealand tennis player

- Full name: Christine Newton
- Country (sports): New Zealand
- Born: 13 February 1956 (age 69)

Singles

Grand Slam singles results
- Australian Open: 1R (1979, 1980)
- French Open: Q1 (1978, 1980, 1982)
- Wimbledon: 2R (1976)
- US Open: Q1 (1978, 1980, 1981, 1982)

Doubles

Grand Slam doubles results
- Australian Open: SF (1979)
- French Open: 3R (1982)
- Wimbledon: 3R (1980)
- US Open: 3R (1978)

Christine Newton (born 13 February 1956) is a New Zealand former professional tennis player.

While competing on tour in the 1970s and 1980s, Newton featured in the main draws of four grand slam tournaments, which included a doubles semi-final appearances at the 1979 Australian Open (with Jenny Walker). She played in the singles second round of the 1976 Wimbledon Championships, losing to Mona Guerrant.

Newton won a doubles title at the Auckland Open in 1978 and was the singles runner-up in 1981.

From 1975 to 1981 she competed in Federation Cup ties for New Zealand, playing in a total of 19 rubbers.
