= Beth Norton =

American tennis player

- Full name: Elizabeth K. Norton
- Country (sports): United States
- Born: June 13, 1957 (age 69) Bridgeport, Connecticut, US
- Plays: Right-handed
- Prize money: $106,173

Singles
- Career record: –
- Highest ranking: No. 20

Grand Slam singles results
- Australian Open: 2R (1978)
- French Open: 2R (1976)
- Wimbledon: 3R (1976)
- US Open: 4R (1976)

Doubles
- Career record: –
- Highest ranking: –

Grand Slam doubles results
- Australian Open: QF (1978, 1982)
- French Open: 1R (1980)
- Wimbledon: 3R (1982)
- US Open: 3R (1976, 1979)

Elizabeth Norton (born June 13, 1957) is a former professional tennis player from the United States.

A right-handed player from Connecticut, Norton was a national junior hardcourt champion and leading junior in the world, before competing professionally in the 1970s and 1980s. She reached a career high ranking of No. 20 in the world.

Norton featured in all four grand slam tournaments during her career. A two-time Australian Open doubles quarter-finalist, her best performance in singles came at the 1976 US Open, where she won through to the round of 16. She was Steffi Graf's doubles partner on the West German's Wimbledon debut in 1984.

As a child, she played a team sport called "hocker", which her father invented so that the whole family could play a sport together.
