= Chris Delaney =

American tennis player

- Full name: Christofer Delaney
- Country (sports): United States
- Born: July 16, 1957 (age 67); Newton, Massachusetts, US
- Height: 1.90 m (6 ft 3 in)
- Plays: Right-handed

Singles
- Career record: 25–32
- Career titles: 0
- Highest ranking: No. 48 (March 24, 1980)

Grand Slam singles results
- Australian Open: 2R (1979)
- French Open: 1R (1980)
- Wimbledon: 1R (1980)
- US Open: 2R (1981)

Doubles
- Career record: 20–26
- Career titles: 3
- Highest ranking: No. 922 (November 5, 1990)

Chris Delaney (born July 16, 1957) is a former professional tennis player from the United States.

Delaney enjoyed most of his tennis success while playing doubles. During his career he won 3 doubles titles.

Delaney's older brother James was also a touring pro.

== Grand Prix and WCT finals ==
=== Doubles (3 wins, 1 loss) ===
| Result | W–L | Date | Tournament | Surface | Partner | Opponents | Score |
|---|---|---|---|---|---|---|---|
| Win | 1–0 | Nov 1977 | Taipei, Taiwan | Hard | (United States) Pat Du Pré | (Australia) Steve Docherty (United States) Tom Gorman | 7–6, 7–6 |
| Win | 2–0 | Nov 1979 | Bombay, India | Clay | (United States) James Delaney | (West Germany) Thomas Fürst (West Germany) Wolfgang Popp | 7–6, 6–2 |
| Loss | 2–1 | Mar 1980 | Metz, France | Carpet | (Australia) Kim Warwick | (Australia) Colin Dibley (United States) Gene Mayer | 6–7, 5–7 |
| Win | 3–1 | Mar 1980 | Nice, France | Clay | (Australia) Kim Warwick | (Czechoslovakia) Stanislav Birner (Czechoslovakia) Jiří Hřebec | 6–4, 6–0 |
