= Paul Kronk =

Australian tennis player

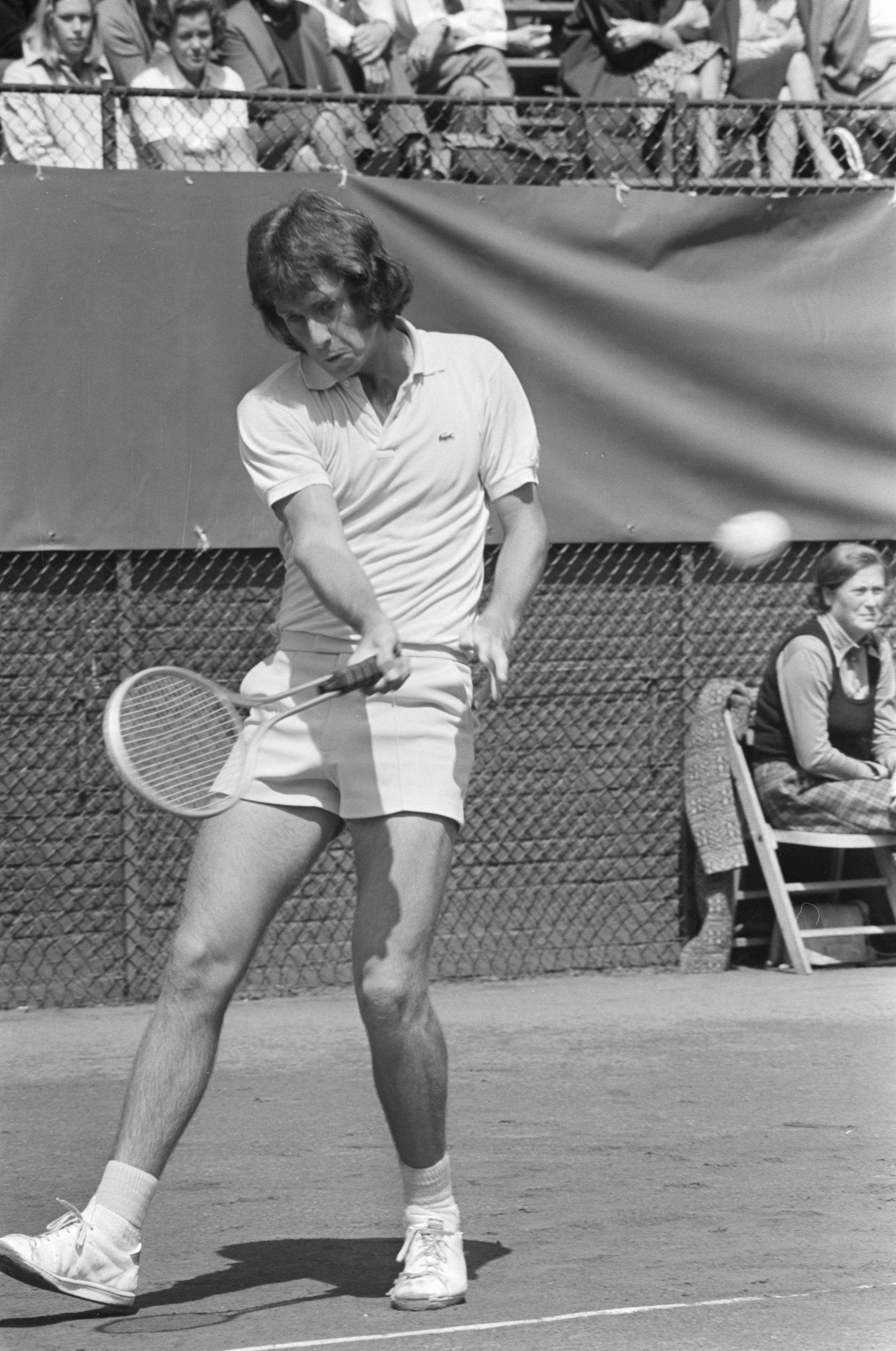
- Kronk at the 1974 Dutch Open
- Country (sports): Australia
- Born: 22 September 1954 (age 71) Toowoomba, Queensland, Australia
- Plays: Right-handed

Singles
- Career record: 106–183
- Career titles: 0
- Highest ranking: No. 66 (6 June 1980)

Grand Slam singles results
- Australian Open: QF (1978)
- Wimbledon: 4R (1981)

Doubles
- Career record: 171–157
- Career titles: 9
- Highest ranking: No. 35 (4 January 1982)

Grand Slam doubles results
- Australian Open: F (1978, 1979)
- Wimbledon: QF (1979)
- US Open: F (1976)

Paul Kronk (born 22 September 1954) is a former tennis player from Australia.

Kronk won nine doubles titles during his professional career. The big-serving right-hander reached his highest singles ATP ranking in June 1980, when he was No. 66 in the world. His highest doubles ranking of world No. 35 was achieved in January 1982. Kronk was a runner-up in the US Open and a two-time runner-up in the Australian Open, on all occasions partnering compatriot Cliff Letcher.

== Grand Slam finals ==
=== Doubles: 3 (3 runner-ups) ===
Result	Year	Championship	Surface	Partner	Opponents	Score
Loss	1976	US Open	Grass	(Australia) Cliff Letcher	(Netherlands) Tom Okker (United States) Marty Riessen	4–6, 4–6
Loss	1978	Australian Open	Grass	(Australia) Cliff Letcher	(Poland) Wojciech Fibak (Australia) Kim Warwick	6–7, 5–7
Loss	1979	Australian Open	Grass	(Australia) Cliff Letcher	(Australia) Peter McNamara (Australia) Paul McNamee	6–7, 2–6

== Career finals ==
=== Doubles: 19 (9 wins / 10 losses) ===
Result	W/L	Date	Tournament	Surface	Partner	Opponents	Score
Loss	0–1	Nov 1974	Melbourne, Australia	Grass	(United States) Mike Estep	(United States) Grover Raz Reid (Australia) Allan Stone	6–7, 4–6
Loss	0–2	Sep 1976	U.S. Open, New York City	Clay	(Australia) Cliff Letcher	(United States) Marty Riessen (Netherlands) Tom Okker	4–6, 4–6
Loss	0–3	Feb 1977	Miami, U.S.	Clay	(Australia) Cliff Letcher	(United States) Brian Gottfried (Mexico) Raúl Ramírez	5–7, 4–6
Loss	0–4	Mar 1977	Hampton, U.S.	Carpet	(Australia) Cliff Letcher	(United States) Sandy Mayer (United States) Stan Smith	4–6, 3–6
Loss	0–5	May 1977	Düsseldorf, West Germany	Clay	(Australia) Cliff Letcher	(West Germany) Jürgen Fassbender (West Germany) Karl Meiler	3–6, 3–6
Loss	0–6	Jan 1979	Australian Open, Melbourne	Grass	(Australia) Cliff Letcher	(Poland) Wojciech Fibak (Australia) Kim Warwick	6–7, 5–7
Loss	0–7	Jan 1980	Australian Open, Melbourne	Grass	(Australia) Cliff Letcher	(Australia) Peter McNamara (Australia) Paul McNamee	6–7, 2–6
Win	1–7	Feb 1980	San Juan, U.S. (Note: Tournament part of Grand Prix circuit but doubles event not officially listed by the ATP.)	Hard	(Australia) Paul McNamee	(South Africa) Robert Trogolo (United States) Mark Turpin	7–6, 6–3
Win	2–7	Apr 1980	Palm Harbor, U.S.	Hard	(Australia) Paul McNamee	(Australia) Steve Docherty (Australia) John James	6–4, 7–5
Win	3–7	Jan 1981	Guarujá, Brasil	Hard	(Australia) David Carter	(Spain) Ángel Giménez (Colombia) Jairo Velasco, Sr.	6–1, 7–6
Win	4–7	Feb 1981	Viña del Mar, Chile	Clay	(Australia) David Carter	(Ecuador) Andrés Gómez (Chile) Belus Prajoux	6–1, 6–2
Win	5–7	Feb 1981	Mar del Plata, Argentina	Clay	(Australia) David Carter	(Spain) Ángel Giménez (Colombia) Jairo Velasco, Sr.	6–7, 6–4, 6–0
Loss	5–8	Mar 1981	Tampa, U.S.	Hard	(Australia) David Carter	(South Africa) Bernard Mitton (United States) Butch Walts	3–6, 6–3, 1–6
Win	6–8	May 1981	Munich, West Germany	Clay	(Australia) David Carter	(United States) Eric Fromm (Israel) Shlomo Glickstein	6–3, 6–4
Loss	6–9	Jul 1981	Gstaad, Switzerland	Clay	(Australia) David Carter	(Switzerland) Heinz Günthardt (Switzerland) Markus Günthardt	4–6, 1–6
Win	7–9	Jul 1981	Kitzbühel, Austria	Clay	(Australia) David Carter	(Socialist Federal Republic of Yugoslavia) Marko Ostoja (Netherlands) Louk Sanders	7–6, 6–1
Win	8–9	Oct 1981	Melbourne Indoor, Australia	Carpet (i)	(Australia) Peter McNamara	(United States) Sherwood Stewart (United States) Ferdi Taygan	3–6, 6–3, 6–4
Loss	8–10	Mar 1982	Linz, Austria	Clay	(Australia) Rod Frawley	(Sweden) Anders Järryd (Sweden) Hans Simonsson	2–6, 0–6
Win	9–10	Mar 1982	Metz, France	Hard (i)	(Australia) David Carter	(United States) Matt Doyle (United States) Dave Siegler	6–3, 7–6
