= Dianne Evers =

Australian tennis player

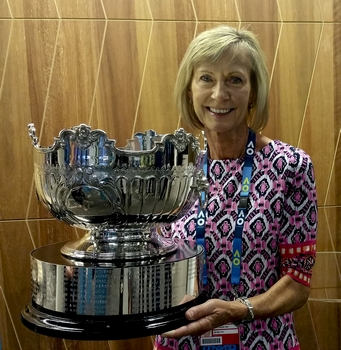
- Dianne Evers holding Australian Open Women's Doubles Trophy
- Country (sports): Australia
- Born: 9 November 1956 (age 69) Melbourne, Australia

Singles

Grand Slam singles results
- Australian Open: SF (1978)
- French Open: 1R (1977, 1978)
- Wimbledon: 2R (1978)
- US Open: 2R (1977)

Doubles
- Career titles: 3

Grand Slam doubles results
- Australian Open: W (1979)
- French Open: QF (1977)
- Wimbledon: 3R (1974, 1978, 1979)
- US Open: 3R (1977)

Grand Slam mixed doubles results
- French Open: SF (1977, 1978)

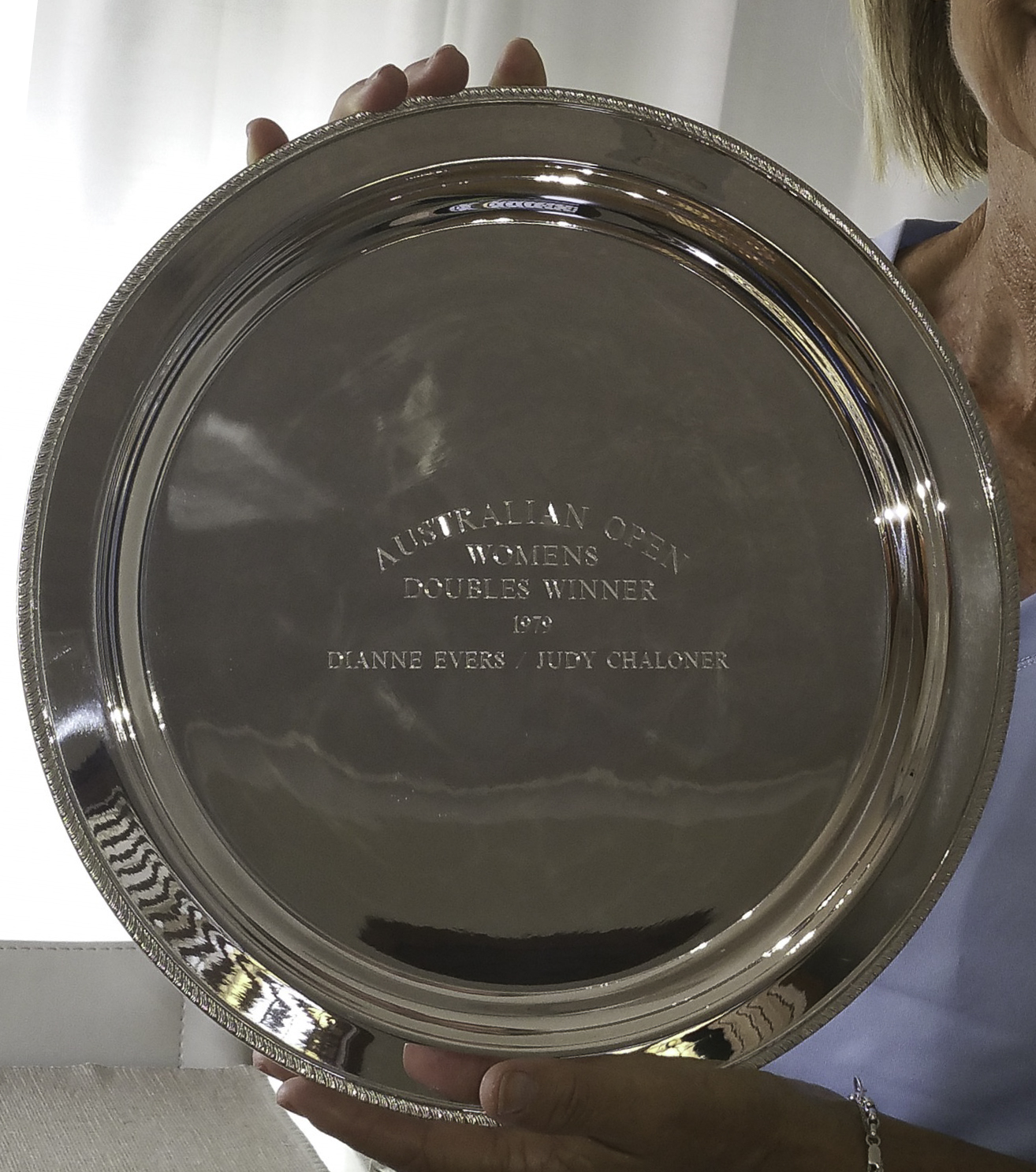

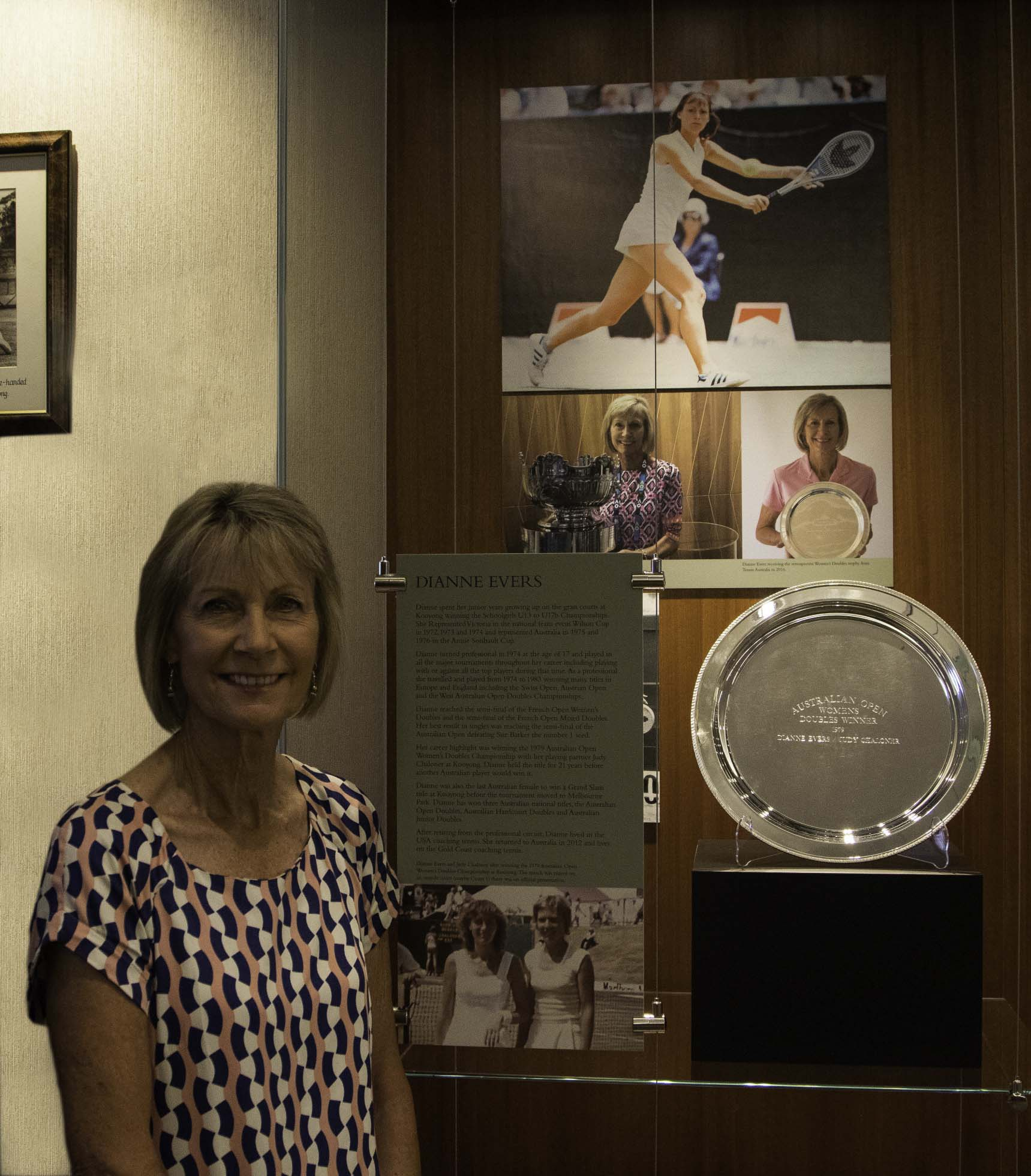

Dianne Evers (Note: Sometimes written as Diane.) (born 9 November 1956) is a retired female tennis player from Australia. With her partner Judy Chaloner, she won the 1979 Australian Open Doubles title and had a career high singles ranking of No. 42.

== Tennis career ==
Evers began playing tennis at Lauriston Lawn Tennis Club in 1965 at the age of nine, and then at Kooyong Lawn Tennis Club from 1967. She started competing in tournaments and interstate competitions at age 11. Her coach and father Bill Evers owned a tennis centre in Murrumbeena, Victoria.

=== Juniors ===
As a junior player for the state of Victoria, Evers won all the junior titles she played in. In 1974 she won the Netherlands Open Junior Girls Singles in Amsterdam and the Irish Open Junior girls singles in Dublin. In 1975 Evers won the Australian Junior Girls Doubles at Kooyong Lawn Tennis Club with partner Nerida Gregory (Aus) and was the runner-up in the Australian Junior Girls Singles title.

=== Professional ===
In 1974, at the age of 17, Evers turned professional and played in the Women's Professional Tour (WTA) where she competed in England, Holland, Ireland and France. She reached the third round of ladies's doubles at Wimbledon with partner Nerida Gregory but lost to Helen Gourlay and Karen Krantzcke. Evers won the Australian Women's Hardcourt Doubles Championship in Gympie with partner Nerida Gregory, defeating Cynthia Doerner and Kathy Walker in straight sets.

At the 1977 French Open, Evers reached the women's doubles quarterfinals with partner Mary Carillo. The next year she advanced to the French Open Mixed Doubles semifinals with partner Paul McNamee. 1978 saw her upset No. 1 seeded Sue Barker in the women's singles quarterfinals of the Australian Open before losing to eventual champion Chris O'Neil in the semifinals in two sets.

Evers had a very successful doubles season in 1979. She won the Australian Open Doubles title with partner Judy Chaloner and the Austrian Open doubles title with partner Helena Anliot. Evers also captured the Swiss Open, Canadian Open, and Western Australian Open doubles titles.

Evers top singles ranking was 42 and in the top 10 doubles ranking.

Throughout her professional career Evers has played tennis in singles, doubles and mixed doubles in different countries at minor and major tournaments such as Wimbledon, US Open, French Open, and Italian, Canadian, Austrian, and English WTA Tournaments. She has been involved in tennis for over five decades at every level of the game and has won over 80 state and national titles and won over 20 international titles.

Evers is the last Australian female player to win an Australian Open title when it was played at Kooyong Lawn Tennis Club, and held the Doubles title for 21 years before another Australian player would win in 2000. She retired in 1983 and moved to Indianapolis in America and took up a career as a tennis coach at the Indianapolis Racquet Club and qualified with the USPTA. Evers moved back permanently to Australia in 2012 and now lives in the Gold Coast in the State of Queensland and is a tennis coach at KDV Sports Center.

In May 2016, Evers received her retrospective Australian Open Trophy from Tennis Australia and at the 2017 Australian Open, Evers finally got to hold the Women's Doubles Trophy for the first time at a private presentation organized by the President of Tennis Australia', Steve Healey.

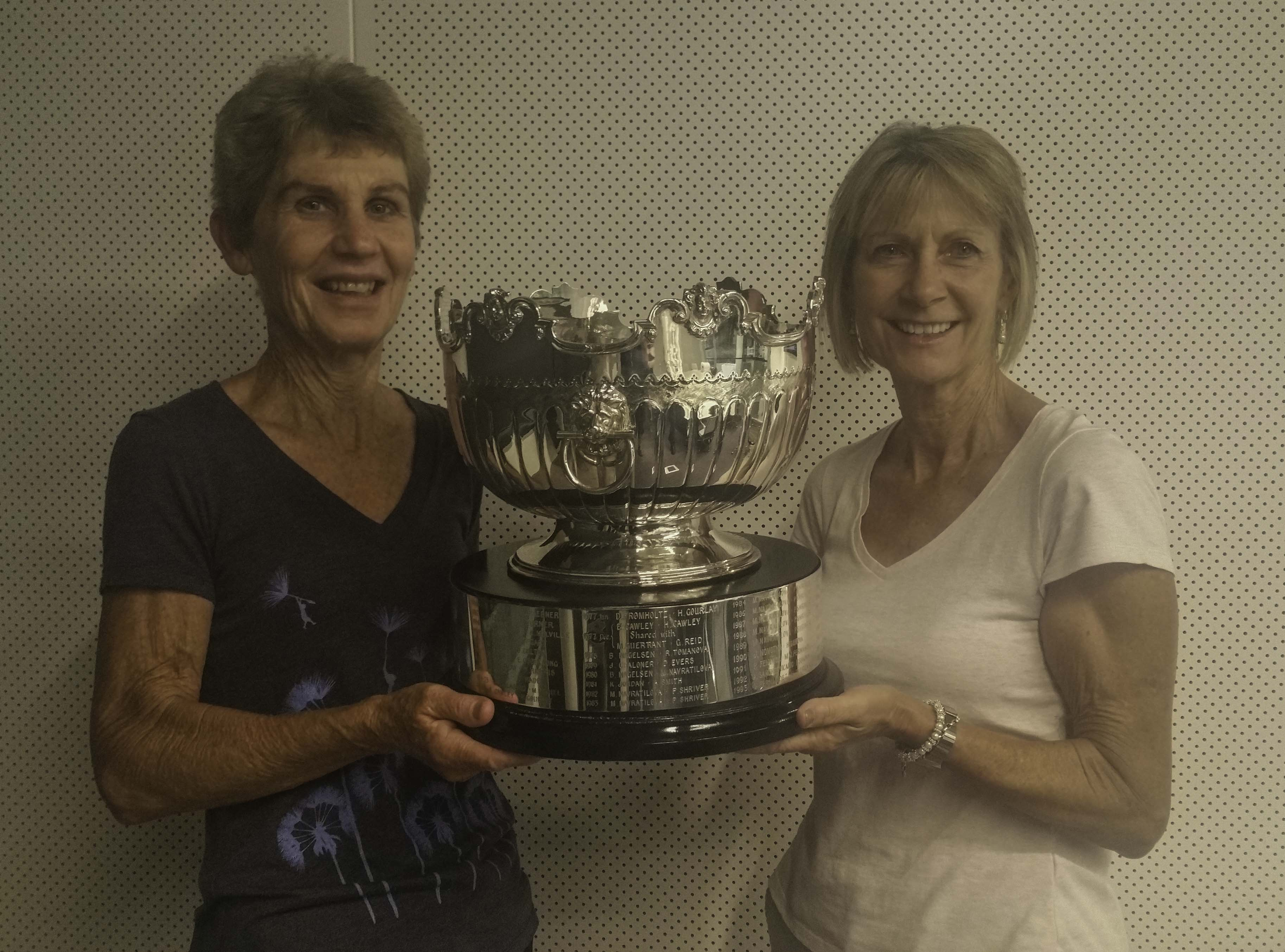

In 2019 Evers, as the last Australian woman to have won a Championship Trophy at Kooyong Lawn Tennis Club, donated her Australian Open Women's Doubles Trophy to Kooyong LTC. It has been placed in a cabinet next to trophies donated by Evonne Goolagong-Cawley AC MBE.

In 2019 Evers and Judy Chaloner after 40 years got to hold the Australian Open Women's Doubles Trophy together for the first time as there was no trophy presentation in 1979.

== Grand Slam finals ==
=== Doubles: 4 (1 title) ===
Result	Year	Championship	Surface	Partner	Opponents	Score
Win	1979	Australian Open	Grass	(New Zealand) Judy Connor	(Australia) Leanne Harrison (Netherlands) Marcella Mesker	6–1, 3–6, 6–0
