= Steve Docherty =

Australian tennis player

- Country (sports): Australia
- Born: 6 May 1950 (age 76) Newcastle, New South Wales
- Plays: Right-handed

Singles
- Career record: 46–76
- Highest ranking: No. 74 (12 June 1978)

Grand Slam singles results
- Australian Open: 2R (1977, 1978, 1979, 1980)
- Wimbledon: 2R (1977, 1978)
- US Open: 2R (1977, 1978)

Doubles
- Career record: 42–69
- Highest ranking: No. 86 (26 December 1979)

Grand Slam doubles results
- Australian Open: 2R (1977, 1979)
- Wimbledon: 1R (1978)
- US Open: 3R (1979)

Steve Docherty (born 6 May 1950) is a former professional tennis player from Australia.

Docherty enjoyed most of his tennis success while playing doubles. During his career, he finished runner-up in 4 doubles events.

His most notable career achievement was when he surprised the world to defeat former world number one Arthur Ashe at Wimbledon in 1978.

After completing his tennis career, Docherty became a successful businessman, owning and operating three McDonald's franchises along the East coast of New South Wales.

== Career finals ==
=== Doubles (4 runner-ups) ===
Result	W/L	Date	Tournament	Surface	Partner	Opponents	Score
Loss	0–1	Nov 1977	Taipei, Taiwan	Hard	(United States) Tom Gorman	(United States) Chris Delaney (United States) Pat Du Pré	6–7, 6–7
Loss	0–2	Sep 1979	Atlanta, U.S.	Hard	(United States) Eliot Teltscher	(South Africa) Raymond Moore (Romania) Ilie Năstase	4–6, 2–6
Loss	0–3	Dec 1979	Sydney Outdoor, Australia	Grass	(United States) Christopher Lewis	(Australia) Peter McNamara (Australia) Paul McNamee	6–7, 3–6
Loss	0–4	Apr 1980	Palm Harbor, U.S.	Hard	(Australia) John James	(Australia) Paul Kronk (Australia) Paul McNamee	4–6, 5–7
