= Guillermo Vilas =

Argentine tennis player

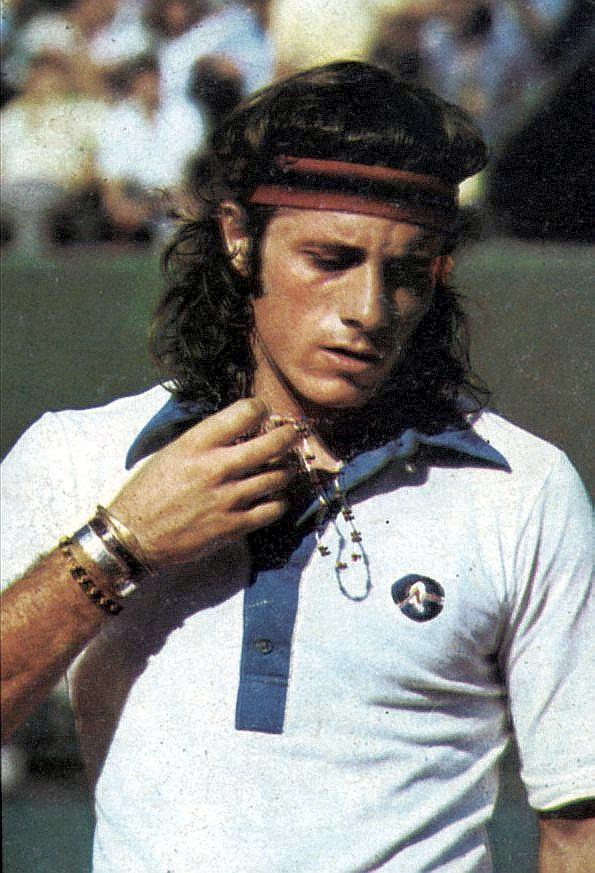
- Guillermo Vilas during the Munich Open in May 1975
- Country (sports): Argentina
- Residence: Montecarlo
- Born: 17 August 1952 (age 74) Buenos Aires, Argentina
- Height: 1.80 m (5 ft 11 in)
- Turned pro: 1968
- Retired: 1992
- Plays: Left-handed (one-handed backhand)
- Prize money: US$4,923,882
- Int. Tennis HoF: 1991 (member page)

Singles
- Career record: 951–297 (76.2%)
- Career titles: 62 (10th in the Open Era)
- Highest ranking: No. 2 (30 April 1975)

Grand Slam singles results
- Australian Open: W (1978, 1979)
- French Open: W (1977)
- Wimbledon: QF (1975, 1976)
- US Open: W (1977)

Other tournaments
- Tour Finals: W (1974)
- WCT Finals: F (1976)

Doubles
- Career record: 217–150 (59.1%)
- Career titles: 16
- Highest ranking: No. 13 (21 May 1979)

Grand Slam doubles results
- Australian Open: 2R (1977^{Jan})
- French Open: SF (1975)
- Wimbledon: 3R (1976)
- US Open: QF (1975)

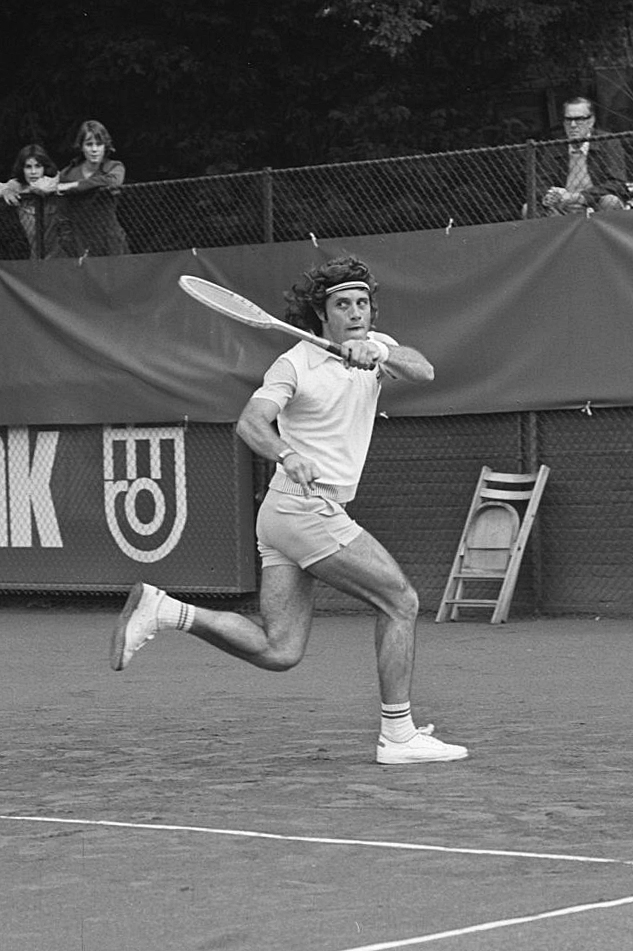
Guillermo Vilas at the 1974 Dutch Open

Guillermo Vilas (locally [ɡiˈʒeɾmo ˈβilas]; (Note: The pronunciation of his given name as /ɡiˈʒeɾmo/ (using zheísmo) is widespread in his native Rioplatense Spanish, and is also used in some English-language media. Vilas himself pronounces his name /ɟʝiˈʎeɾmo/, per a 2015 interview.) Latin American Spanish pronunciation: [ɡiˈʝeɾmo ˈβilas]; born 17 August 1952) is an Argentine former professional tennis player. He was the world No. 1 of the ITF Grand Prix seasons in 1974, 1975 and 1977. He won 62 singles titles and 16 doubles titles during his career, including four Grand Slam singles titles and the 1974 Tour Finals. World Tennis, among other rankings and publications, rated him as world No. 1 in 1977. In the computerized ATP rankings, he peaked at No. 2 in April 1975, a position he held for a total of 83 weeks, although some have argued that Vilas should have been ranked No. 1 for at least 10 weeks, particularly in 1977 when he won two majors. Representing his country, he and José Luis Clerc led Argentina to win their first ATP World Team Cup in 1980, and reached the Davis Cup finals in 1981. He was inducted into the International Tennis Hall of Fame in 1991, two years after his first retirement.

Vilas is known for his prowess on clay courts. He won over 650 matches on clay, an all-time record. His peak was the 1977 season during which he won 16 ATP singles titles, including two majors (both on clay) and had a 53-match winning streak on clay, the longest in the Open Era at his time. In 2016, The Daily Telegraph ranked him as the third best male clay-court player of all time, behind Rafael Nadal and Björn Borg. In 2018, Steve Tignor for Tennis Magazine ranked him as the 16th greatest tennis player of the Open Era.

Historical and statistical studies presented in 2015 by Argentinian journalist Eduardo Puppo and Romanian mathematician Marian Ciulpan concluded that Vilas should have been No. 1 in the old ATP ranking system for seven weeks between 1975 and 1976. The ATP and its chief executive at that time, Chris Kermode, although not refuting the data, decided not to officially recognize Vilas as No. 1. In October 2020, Netflix released a documentary film about Vilas's case titled Guillermo Vilas: Settling the Score. In May 2024, the ATP's vice-president claimed that Vilas will never be number one.

== Career ==
=== 1968–1976 ===
Raised in the seaside resort of Mar del Plata, Vilas was a left-hander and played his first tour event in 1968. He was in the year-ending top ten from 1974 through 1982. He was a clay-court specialist and played well on hard-court, grass, and carpet surfaces.

In 1974, Vilas won the year-end Masters Grand Prix title, beating John Newcombe and Björn Borg in round robin, and Ilie Nastase (who was trying to win his fourth Masters title in a row) in five sets in the final on the grass of Kooyong. "Somebody asked me before what I think of grass and I say 'the grass is for cows'. Now I think some for cows and some for tennis" said Vilas afterwards. Nastase could not understand how Vilas hit so many topspin winners. In 1975 Vilas and Bjorn Borg hit with heavy top spin in many long baseline rallies in the French Open final. Borg won in straight sets.

=== 1977: Best year and record win streak ===
A left-handed baseliner, Vilas's best year on tour was 1977 when he won 16 singles titles, including two of the four major Grand Slam singles tournaments and 16 of the 31 Association of Tennis Professionals tournaments he entered. His playing record for 1977 was 130 wins against 15 losses (89.65%). Not including the Masters year-end championship, he won 72 of his last 73 ATP matches in 1977. He lost the January Australian Open final to big serving Roscoe Tanner in straight sets. Vilas beat Brian Gottfried in the French Open final, losing just three games. "I was powerless. Everything I tried he did something better", said Gottfried afterwards. The highest point during this run was winning the last US Open played at Forest Hills against Jimmy Connors in four sets in a match where Vilas surprised his American rival by attacking the net.

In 1977 he won seven consecutive titles after Wimbledon—Kitzbühel (clay), Washington (clay), Louisville (clay), South Orange (clay), Columbus (clay), US Open (clay) and Paris (clay)—and set up a 46-match all-surface winning streak. He also had a record 53-match winning streak on clay courts, which stood until surpassed by Rafael Nadal in 2006. Both his winning streaks were terminated in October 1977 by Ilie Năstase in the final of the Raquette d'Or tournament. In that best-of-five-set final, Vilas dropped the first two sets by 6–1, 7–5 and then retired in protest of Năstase's use of a spaghetti racquet. (The ITF had voted to ban the racquet, but the ban did not take effect until the day after the match). After that he won a further 28 matches in a row with titles at Tehran, Bogotá, Santiago, Buenos Aires (all on clay), and Johannesburg (hard). That run was ended in the Masters semi-finals by Björn Borg.

=== ATP ranking No. 1 controversy ===
Even though he won 21 singles titles including 16 ATP titles that season, including the French Open and the US Open and was the runner-up at the January edition of the Australian Open in 1977, Vilas was never ranked by the ATP as world No. 1 during 1977 which was due to the fact that the rankings at the time were based on the average of a player's results. He was instead ranked year-end world No. 2, behind Jimmy Connors who won 8 singles titles only (including the Masters Grand Prix and did not win any of the 4 Grand Slam titles, but was the runner-up at Wimbledon and the US Open in 1977). Nevertheless, Vilas was rated number one by World Tennis, France Presse, Le Livre d'or du Tennis, Gene Scott, Peter Bodo, Christian Quidet, and Michael Sutter. The International Tennis Hall of Fame inscription for Vilas stated "it was generally considered Vilas was the real No. 1 for 1977". Vilas was also rated number one by Bud Collins and John Barrett by the 2010s.

Argentine journalist Eduardo Puppo and Romanian mathematician Marian Ciulpan investigated the 1973–78 period records, and delivered a detailed report with more than 1,200 pages in which they came to the conclusion that Vilas should have been ranked No. 1 for five weeks in 1975 as well as during the first two weeks of 1976 and handed over their research to the ATP at the end of 2014. Although the study was not refuted, in May 2015 the ATP announced it had decided not to make official the No. 1 position for Vilas because it happened in the interval between the publications of the official rankings.

In October 2020, Netflix released a documentary about the controversy titled Guillermo Vilas: Settling the Score. The documentary drew parallels with Evonne Goolagong's recognition as world no. 1 (for two weeks in 1976) retroactively by the WTA in 2007. In May 2024, ATP's vice-president says that Vilas will never be number one of that ranking.

After the retroactive recognition of Goolagong, Eduardo Puppo redoubled his efforts to have Guillermo Vilas retroactively recognized as well.

=== 1978–1982 ===
Borg beat Vilas for the loss of just five games in the 1978 French Open final (Borg didn't lose a set in the tournament). "We had some long games, but I won all the important points" said Borg afterwards. "He's quicker than me, but I am stronger. But it was not a long match where I could take advantage of my strength" said Vilas afterwards. Vilas arrived in Australia in November 1978 and trained with his coach Ion Țiriac for seven hours a day in preparation for the Australian Open in late December, in order to adapt his game to the grass courts. He beat John Marks in four sets in the final. "Vilas displayed magnificent court coverage and his adept use of the top spin lob worried Marks." The following year Vilas beat John Sadri in the Australian Open final in straight sets to retain his title. He remarked on the tough playing conditions saying "one day it is windy and the next day it is not. The wind was harder this morning during practice, and it slowed down during the match." Vilas' last Grand Slam final was at the French Open in 1982 where he lost to Mats Wilander in four sets. It was notable for its long rallies, the longest point taking 90 strokes.

=== 1983–1992 ===
By now in his thirties, on June 7, 1983, the Men's International Professional Tennis Council suspended Vilas for one year and fined him $20,000, having found that his manager and coach, Ion Țiriac, on the player's behalf, had accepted about $60,000 in appearance money from tournament promoters. Such payments were barred by the rules of the Grand Prix circuit. Vilas finished 1983 outside the top 10 at number 11. He finished 1984 ranked 28. Vilas' last significant run in a major was a quarter final appearance at the 1986 French Open, where he had three set points for a 2 sets to 0 lead against Johan Kriek before losing in four sets. Vilas retired from the ATP Tour in 1989 but still played on the ATP Challenger Series until 1992. He was inducted into the International Tennis Hall of Fame in 1991. Vilas was in the stands at Flushing Meadows to support his compatriot, Juan Martín del Potro, who defeated Roger Federer in an upset in the 2009 US Open final.

== Personal life ==
Vilas was nicknamed "Willy" throughout his tennis career (and especially in his native Argentina). His pioneering use of the tweener shot was reflected in its original name, the "Gran Willy"; by which it is still known in Spanish.

In 2005, after living the life of an international playboy for most of his adult life, Vilas settled down and married. He was 47 when he met Phiangphathu Khumueang, a 17-year-old from Thailand, and they married five years later. They have three daughters and one son. They reside in Monaco. It was reported in 2020 that he was suffering from a form of dementia.

== Distinctions ==
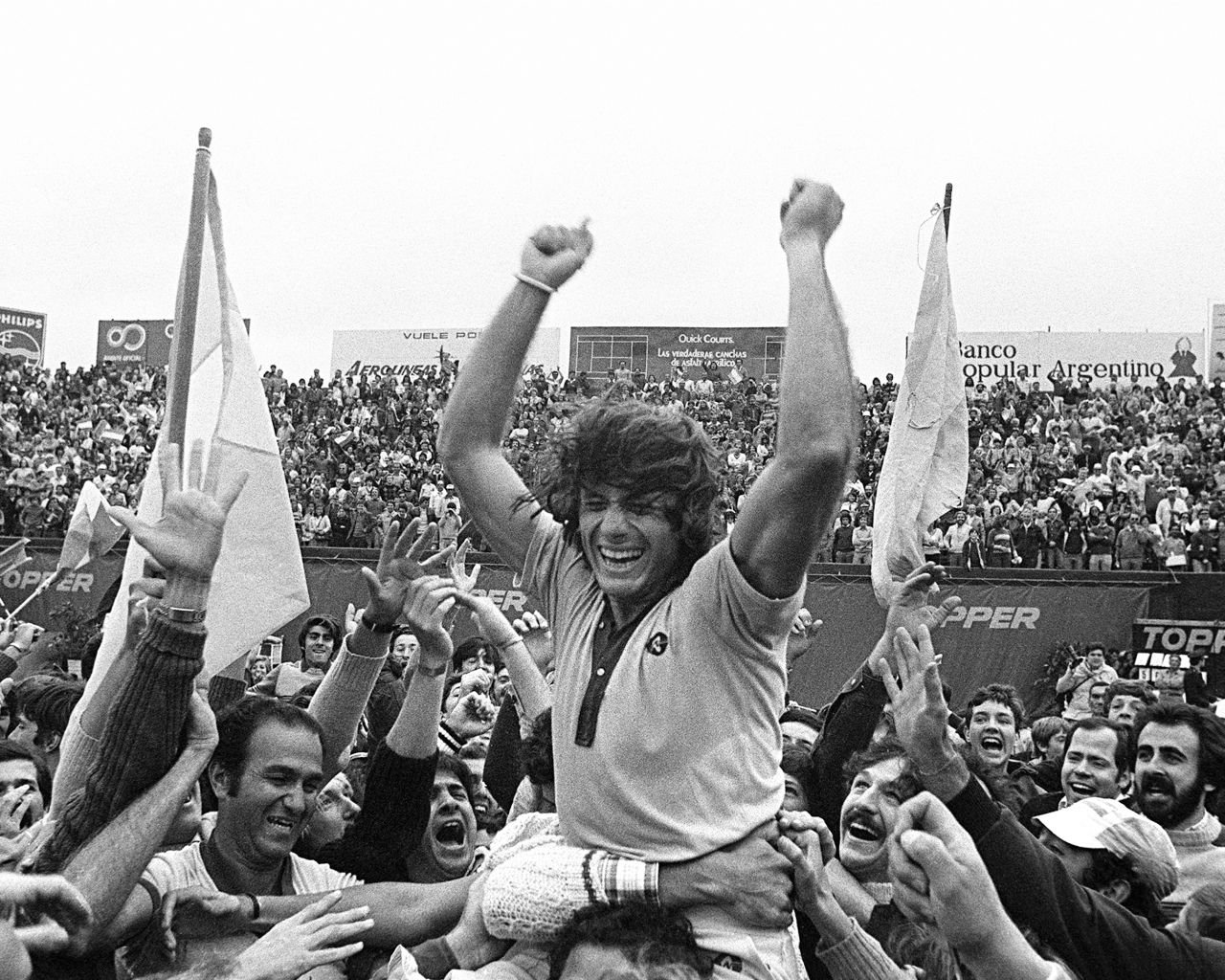
Vilas after winning the Buenos Aires Open and securing the first place in the 1977 Grand Prix Circuit.

- Won the Grand Prix circuit in 1974, 1975, and 1977.
- World Tennis Magazine, France Presse, Michel Sutter and Christian Quidet, among other unofficial sources, ranked him as No. 1 Tennis Player of the Year in 1977.
- Held the Open Era male record for the longest winning streak on clay courts at 53 matches, set in 1977, until it was bettered by Rafael Nadal in 2006. Nadal later extended this to 81 matches.
- Won 62 ATP singles titles (eighth highest during the Open Era) and was the runner-up in 40 singles tournaments (plus two unfinished finals). Won 16 doubles titles with other 10 doubles finals.
- He took Argentina to its first-ever Davis Cup final in 1981 (lost to the United States), together with José Luis Clerc, who was also a top-ten player. The Argentine press often referred to the tensions between the two of them, which even reverberated to the 2004 French Open awards ceremony, in which Vilas presented Gastón Gaudio with his trophy.
- Vilas's success on the court led to a surge in popularity of tennis in Argentina and throughout Latin America. Guillermo Cañas and Guillermo Coria were named after him.
- In 2016, The Daily Telegraph ranked him as the third best male clay-court player of all time, behind Rafael Nadal and Björn Borg.
- In 2018, Steve Tignor for Tennis Magazine ranked him as the 16th greatest tennis player of the Open Era.

== Career statistics ==
=== Singles performance timeline ===
Key
W	F	SF	QF	#R	RR	Q#	DNQ	A	NH

(W) winner; (F) finalist; (SF) semifinalist; (QF) quarterfinalist; (#R) rounds 4, 3, 2, 1; (RR) round-robin stage; (Q#) qualification round; (DNQ) did not qualify; (A) absent; (NH) not held; (SR) strike rate (events won / competed); (W–L) win–loss record.

Tournament	1970	1971	1972	1973	1974	1975	1976	1977		1978	1979	1980	1981	1982	1983	1984	1985	1986	1987	1988	1989	SR	W–L
Grand Slam tournaments
Australian Open (Note: The Australian Open was played twice in 1977, in January and December. Vilas played only in the January event.)	A	A	A	A	A	A	A	F	A	W	W	SF	3R	A	A	A	A	NH	A	A	A	2 / 5	23–3
French Open	A	A	3R (Note: The 1972 French Open had two preliminary rounds. After qualifying, Vilas won in both to enter the main draw. These wins do not count as main draw wins.)	3R	3R	F	QF	W		F	QF	QF	4R	F	QF	1R	2R	QF	2R	2R	1R	1 / 18	56–17
Wimbledon	1R	A	1R	A	3R	QF	QF	3R		3R	2R	A	1R	A	1R	A	A	1R	A	A	A	0 / 11	15–11
US Open	A	A	2R	1R	4R	SF	SF	W		4R	4R	4R	4R	SF	3R	3R	2R	1R	A	A	A	1 / 15	43–14
Win–loss	0–1	0–0	3–3	2–2	7–3	15–3	13–3	21–2		17–3	14–3	10–3	8–4	11–2	6–3	2–2	2–2	4–3	1–1	1–1	0–1	4 / 49	137–45
Year-end ranking	–	–	–	31	5	2	6	2		3	6	5	6	4	11	28	39	22	71	126	408		
Year-end championship
Masters	A	A	A	A	W	SF	SF	SF (Note: The year-ending Masters tournament was played in January of the following year.)		A	RR	RR	RR	SF	A	A	A	A	A	A	A	1 / 8	16–11

== Grand Slam finals ==
=== Singles: 8 (4 titles, 4 runner-ups) ===
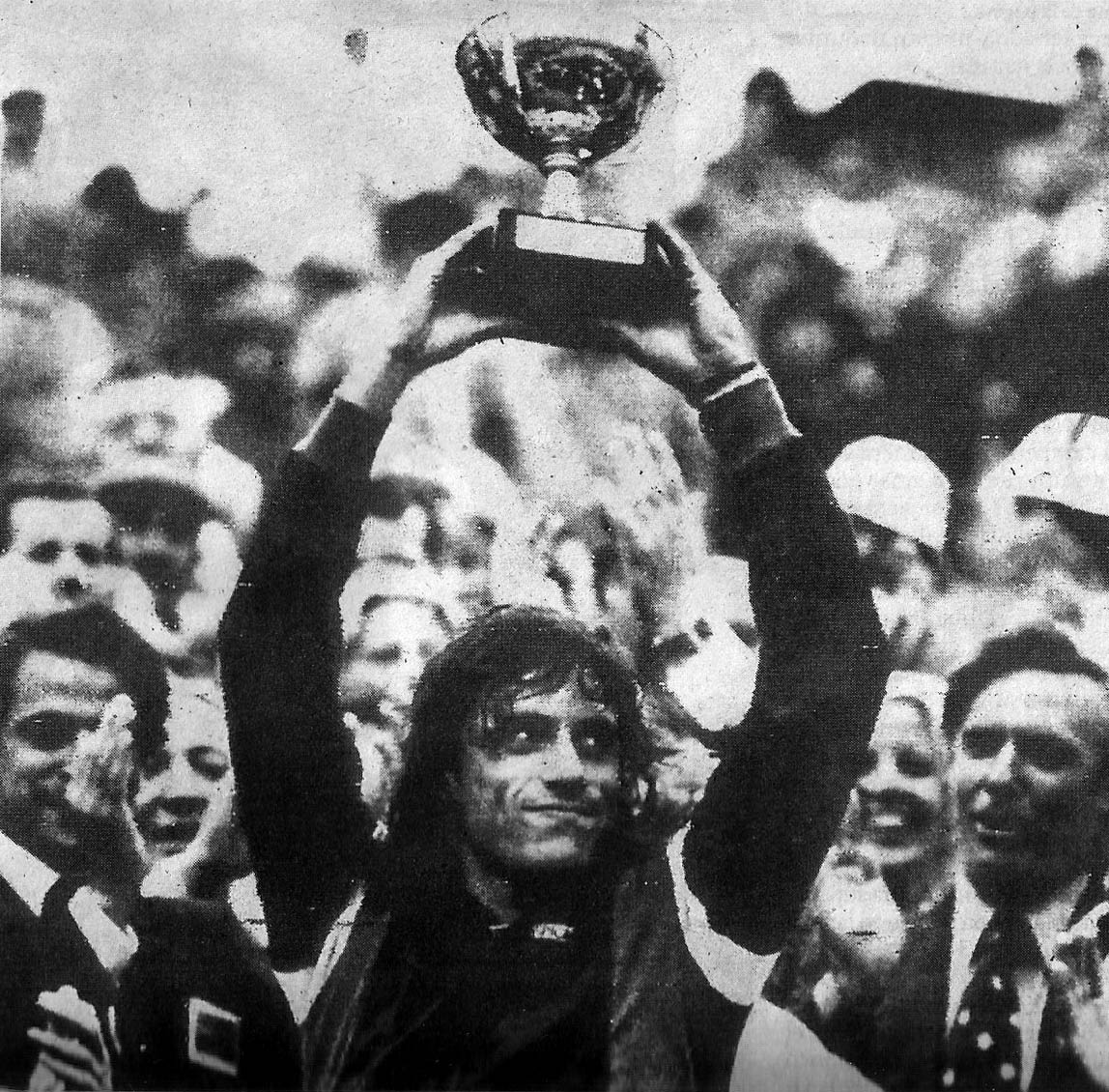
Vilas celebrating his win at the 1977 French Open.

Result	Year	Championship	Surface	Opponent	Score
Loss	1975	French Open	Clay	(Sweden) Björn Borg	2–6, 3–6, 4–6
Loss	1977	Australian Open (Jan.)	Grass	(United States) Roscoe Tanner	3–6, 3–6, 3–6
Win	1977	French Open	Clay	(United States) Brian Gottfried	6–0, 6–3, 6–0
Win	1977	US Open	Clay	(United States) Jimmy Connors	2–6, 6–3, 7–6^{(7–4)}, 6–0
Loss	1978	French Open (2)	Clay	(Sweden) Björn Borg	1–6, 1–6, 3–6
Win	1978	Australian Open	Grass	(Australia) John Marks	6–4, 6–4, 3–6, 6–3
Win	1979	Australian Open (2)	Grass	(United States) John Sadri	7–6^{(7–4)}, 6–3, 6–2
Loss	1982	French Open (3)	Clay	(Sweden) Mats Wilander	6–1, 6–7^{(6–8)}, 0–6, 4–6

=== Records ===
- These records were attained in Open Era of tennis.

Event	Years	Record accomplished	Player tied
US Open	1977	72.1% (106–41) games winning % in 1 tournament	Stands alone
Grand Prix Tour	1977	16 titles in 1 season	Stands alone
Grand Prix Tour	1977	22 finals reached in 1 season	Stands alone
Grand Prix Tour	1977	14 clay-court titles in 1 season	Stands alone
Grand Prix Tour	1977	120 outdoor match-wins in 1 season	Stands alone
Grand Prix Tour	1977	15 outdoor titles in 1 season	Stands alone
Grand Prix Tour	1977	145 match-wins in 1 season	Stands alone
Grand Prix Tour	1973–88	632 clay-court match-wins	Stands alone
ATP Buenos Aires	1973–82	8 singles titles	Stands alone
ATP Buenos Aires	1973–77	6 consecutive titles (Note: Tournament was played twice in 1977.)	Stands alone

== Notes ==
Awards
Preceded by Vijay Amritraj	ATP Most Improved Player; 1974	Succeeded by Vitas Gerulaitis
Preceded by Horacio Iglesias	Olimpia de Oro; 1974 – 1975	Succeeded by Juan Carlos Harriot
Preceded by Juan Carlos Harriot	Olimpia de Oro; 1977	Succeeded by Daniel Martinazzo
