= Cynthia Doerner =

Australian tennis player

- Full name: Cynthia Doerner Sieler
- Country (sports): Australia
- Residence: Fresno, California
- Born: 11 February 1951 (age 75) Victoria, Australia
- Height: 168 cm (5 ft 6 in)
- Turned pro: 1970 (1967 amateur)
- Retired: 1980
- Plays: Right-handed

Singles
- Career record: 154-170 (47.5%)
- Career titles: 5

Grand Slam singles results
- Australian Open: QF (1979)
- French Open: 3R (1976)
- Wimbledon: 3R (1976, 1977, 1979)
- US Open: 2R (1975, 1977, 1978)

Doubles
- Career record: 34–49
- Career titles: 3

Grand Slam doubles results
- Australian Open: SF (1973)
- French Open: SF (1977)
- Wimbledon: QF (1973)
- US Open: 3R (1977)

Grand Slam mixed doubles results
- French Open: QF (1973)
- Wimbledon: 3R (1979)
- US Open: 1R (1976)

Cynthia Doerner (née Sieler; born 11 February 1951) is an Australian former international tennis player and coach. She achieved a career-high singles ranking of world No. 15, and won five singles titles.

She competed in the Australian Open seven times, thrice as Cynthia Sieler (1968, 1970, and 1971) and four times as Cynthia Doerner, from 1973 to 1979.

Her career singles highlights include winning the Connaught Hard Court Championships in 1972, the New York Invitational in 1975, and the Surrey Grass Court Championships in 1979. Her career highlights also include reaching the 1979 Australian Open singles quarterfinals, winning the 1976 Canadian Open doubles title with Janet Newberry, and reaching the 1977 French Open doubles semifinals. She also competed in World TeamTennis for the Houston E-Z Riders with her husband, Peter Doerner.

After retiring in 1980 due to knee injuries, Doerner coached both at Pepperdine University and directing tennis programs in Southern California and Fresno, California.

== Early life ==
Born in Victoria, Australia, Doerner initially learned the fundamentals of tennis from her father and her uncles.

== Tennis career ==
Doerner played in the main singles draw of the Australian Open seven times during her career. Her first three appearances she played under her maiden name, Cynthia Sieler, in 1968, 1970, and 1971. Following her marriage, she returned to play the Australian Open main draw four more times as Cynthia Doerner between the years of 1973 and 1979. She described playing at Wimbledon as a childhood "Holy Grail." In addition, she played professional team tennis in the United States, competing alongside her husband Peter Doerner for the Houston E-Z Riders franchise during the 1974 World Team Tennis season.

In August 1975, Doerner won the Ms. America tennis circuit title in Long Island City, New York. Seeded second in the tournament, she defeated top-seeded Jeanne Evert in the final.

At the 1976 US Open she played mixed doubles alongside American Steve Turner, but they lost in the first round to defending champions Americans Dick Stockton and Rosie Casals. She partnered with Janet Newberry to win the women's doubles title at the 1976 Canadian Open.

At the 1979 Australian Open, she was seeded 8th and defeated Kym Ruddell and Sue Saliba to reach her career-best Grand Slam quarterfinals, where she fell to Renata Tomanová. At the French Open, she advanced to the third round in singles in 1976, and reached the women's doubles semifinals in 1977. She reached the singles third round at Wimbledon in 1976, 1977, and 1979. At the US Open, she advanced to the singles second round in 1975, 1977, and 1978, as well as the third round in doubles in 1977.

Doerner had to retire from professional tennis in 1980 at the age of 29, because of recurring knee injuries. She reached a career-high singles ranking of world No. 15.

== Coaching ==
Following her retirement, Doerner coached tennis. Between 1989 and 2010, she operated a grassroots program as the head tennis professional at two clubs. Managing five assistant coaches and overseeing 300 students, she taught players ranging from 5-year-old beginners to elite players. She also served as an assistant coach for the Pepperdine University Women's Tennis Team, and taught private lessons in the Malibu, Agoura, and Thousand Oaks neighborhoods of California.

Doerner later relocated to Fresno, California, where she continued to teach part-time. She served as the head coach of the Fresno State Bulldogs women's tennis team for two seasons, from 1987 to 1988. She also pioneered a specialized program designed to introduce 3-year-olds to tennis. She emphasized that a good coach must be able to read a player uniquely, and help that person on their individual journey.

== Personal life ==
Cynthia Doerner married fellow Australian professional tennis player Peter Doerner in 1972.

Both of her sons subsequently played college tennis in the United States. Her elder son, Scott Doerner, became an All-American at Pepperdine University, and anchored the No. 1 singles position for the Waves' 2006 NCAA Championship-winning team. Her younger son, Austin Doerner, played singles and doubles under an athletic scholarship for the DePaul University Blue Demons.
