= Leanne Harrison =

Australian tennis player

- Country (sports): Australia
- Born: 10 April 1958 Mount Evelyn, Australia
- Died: 16 January 2026 (aged 67)

Singles

Grand Slam singles results
- Australian Open: 2R (1977, 1979)

Doubles

Grand Slam doubles results
- Australian Open: F (1979)
- Wimbledon: 2R (1978, 1980)

Leanne Harrison (10 April 1958–16 January 2026) was a tennis player from Australia who was a runner-up in doubles at the 1979 Australian Open.

== Grand Slam finals ==
=== Doubles: 1 (1 runner-up) ===
Result	Year	Championship	Surface	Partner	Opponents	Score
Loss	1979	Australian Open	Grass	(Netherlands) Marcella Mesker	(New Zealand) Judy Connor (Australia) Diane Evers	2–6, 6–1, 0–6
