= Judy Connor =

New Zealand tennis player

- Country (sports): New Zealand
- Born: 18 November 1953 (age 72)

Singles
- Career titles: 0

Grand Slam singles results
- Australian Open: 2R (1979)
- French Open: 1R (1977)
- Wimbledon: 2R (1975, 1978)

Doubles
- Career titles: 1

Grand Slam doubles results
- Australian Open: W (1979)
- Wimbledon: 2R (1976)
- US Open: 1R (1979)

Judith Connor (born 18 November 1953) is a retired female tennis player from New Zealand also known by her married name, Judy Connor-Chaloner. She won the 1979 doubles title at the Australian Open, alongside Dianne Evers, her first and only career Grand Slam title.

== Grand Slam finals ==
=== Doubles: 1 (1 title) ===
Result	Year	Championship	Surface	Partner	Opponents	Score
Win	1979	Australian Open	Grass	(Australia) Dianne Evers	(Australia) Leanne Harrison (Netherlands) Marcella Mesker	6–1, 3–6, 6–0
