= 1979 Australian Open =

- Date: 24 December 1979 – 2 January 1980
- Edition: 68th
- Category: Grand Slam (ITF)
- Surface: grass
- Location: Melbourne, Australia
- Venue: Kooyong Lawn Tennis Club

Champions

Men's singles
- (Argentina) Guillermo Vilas

Women's singles
- (United States) Barbara Jordan

Men's doubles
- (Australia) Peter McNamara / (Australia) Paul McNamee

Women's doubles
- (New Zealand) Judy Chaloner / (Australia) Diane Evers
- Australian Open

The 1979 Australian Open was a tennis tournament played on outdoor grass courts at the Kooyong Lawn Tennis Club in Melbourne in Victoria in Australia and was held from 24 December 1979 through 2 January 1980. It was the 68th edition of the Australian Open and the fourth Grand Slam tournament of the year. The singles titles were won by Argentinian Guillermo Vilas and American Barbara Jordan.

== Seniors ==
=== Men's singles ===
(Argentina) Guillermo Vilas defeated (United States) John Sadri, 7–6^{(7–4)}, 6–3, 6–2

• It was Vilas' 4th and last career Grand Slam singles title and his 2nd title at the Australian Open.

=== Women's singles ===
(United States) Barbara Jordan defeated (United States) Sharon Walsh, 6–3, 6–3

• It was Jordan's 1st and only career Grand Slam singles title.

=== Men's doubles ===
(Australia) Peter McNamara / (Australia) Paul McNamee defeated (Australia) Paul Kronk / (Australia) Cliff Letcher, 7–6, 6–2

• It was McNamara's 1st career Grand Slam doubles title.
• It was McNamee's 1st career Grand Slam doubles title.

=== Women's doubles ===
(New Zealand) Judy Connor Chaloner / (Australia) Diane Evers defeated (Australia) Leanne Harrison / (Netherlands) Marcella Mesker, 6–1, 3–6, 6–0

• It was Connor's 1st and only career Grand Slam doubles title.
• It was Evers's 1st and only career Grand Slam doubles title.

=== Mixed doubles ===
This event was not held from 1970 until 1985.

Preceded by 1979 US Open	Grand Slams	Succeeded by 1980 French Open
