= Sue Saliba =

Australian tennis player

- Country (sports): Australia
- Born: 14 October 1957 (age 67); Melbourne, Australia
- Height: 164 cm (5 ft 4 1/2 in)
- Plays: Right-handed

Singles

Grand Slam singles results
- Australian Open: 2R (1979, 1980, 1981)
- Wimbledon: 3R (1980)
- US Open: 2R (1977, 1980)

Doubles

Grand Slam doubles results
- Australian Open: QF (1978, 1979)
- Wimbledon: 3R (1980, 1981)
- US Open: 2R (1979)

Sue Saliba (born 14 October 1957) is a retired tennis player from Australia who won Australian Open girls' singles championship in 1976

Saliba reached the Wimbledon singles third round in 1980.
