= Chris O'Neil (tennis) =

Australian tennis player (born 1956)

- Country (sports): Australia
- Residence: Australia
- Born: 19 March 1956 (age 69) Newcastle, New South Wales, Australia
- Height: 175 cm (5 ft 9 in)
- Turned pro: 1973
- Plays: Right-handed
- Prize money: US$ 56,291

Singles
- Career record: 19–52
- Career titles: 1
- Highest ranking: No. 80 (1978)

Grand Slam singles results
- Australian Open: W (1978)
- French Open: 2R (1981)
- Wimbledon: 3R (1974)
- US Open: 2R (1978, 1979)

Doubles
- Career record: 64–82
- Career titles: 1

Grand Slam doubles results
- Australian Open: SF (1976, 1978)
- French Open: QF (1978)
- Wimbledon: QF (1976)
- US Open: QF (1978)

Grand Slam mixed doubles results
- Wimbledon: 2R (1976, 1977)
- US Open: 2R (1978)

Christine O'Neil (born 19 March 1956) is an Australian former professional tennis player.

O'Neil is best known for her singles victory at the 1978 Australian Open, and was the last Australian to win the title until Ashleigh Barty in 2022. She also became the first unseeded woman to win the title in the Open era. O'Neil is also one of the few players who have won both the Australian Open junior (1973) and senior (1978) titles.

In 2007, along with her brothers Keith and William, O'Neil took over the Morisset Sports & Tennis Centre located in Newcastle, New South Wales. The centre was subsequently renamed the O'Neil School of Tennis. She then moved on to operate O'Neil's School of Tennis in Cessnock, New South Wales. She has since moved to Port Macquarie and currently coaches.

== Grand Slam finals ==
=== Singles (1 title) ===
Result	Year	Championship	Surface	Opponent	Score
Win	1978	Australian Open	Grass	(United States) Betsy Nagelsen	6–3, 7–6^{(7–3)}

== Grand Slam tournament performance timeline ==
Key
W	F	SF	QF	#R	RR	Q#	DNQ	A	NH

(W) winner; (F) finalist; (SF) semifinalist; (QF) quarterfinalist; (#R) rounds 4, 3, 2, 1; (RR) round-robin stage; (Q#) qualification round; (DNQ) did not qualify; (A) absent; (NH) not held; (SR) strike rate (events won / competed); (W–L) win–loss record.

=== Singles ===
Tournament	1973	1974	1975	1976	1977		1978	1979	1980	1981	1982	1983	SR
Australian Open	1R	1R	2R	1R	1R	A	W	A	A	Q2	2R	Q2	1 / 7
French Open	A	Q1	A	1R	1R		1R	1R	Q2	2R	A	1R	0 / 6
Wimbledon	A	3R	1R	Q3	2R		1R	2R	Q2	1R	A	1R	0 / 7
US Open	A	1R	A	A	A		2R	2R	Q3	A	A	Q2	0 / 3
Strike rate	0 / 1	0 / 3	0 / 2	0 / 2	0 / 3		1 / 4	0 / 3	0 / 0	0 / 2	0 / 1	0 / 2	1 / 23

Note: The Australian Open was held twice in 1977, in January and December.
