= 1977 in tennis =

This page covers all the important events in the sport of tennis in 1977. It provides the results of notable tournaments throughout the year on both the men's and the women's tennis circuits.

== Australian Open ==
=== Australian Open (January) ===
Category	Champion(s)	Finalist(s)	Score
Men's singles	(United States) Roscoe Tanner	(Argentina) Guillermo Vilas	6–3, 6–3, 6–3 (Note: It was Tanner's 1st (and only) career Grand Slam title.)
Women's singles	(Australia) Kerry Melville Reid	(Australia) Dianne Fromholtz	7–5, 6–2 (Note: It was Melville's 1st (and only) career Grand Slam title.)
Men's doubles	(United States) Arthur Ashe (Australia) Tony Roche	(United States) Charlie Pasarell (United States) Erik van Dillen	6–4, 6–4
Women's doubles	(Australia) Dianne Fromholtz (Australia) Helen Gourlay	(Australia) Kerry Melville Reid (United States) Betsy Nagelsen	5–7, 6–1, 7–5
Mixed doubles	Competition not held between 1970 and 1986.		

=== Australian Open (December) ===
Category	Champion(s)	Finalist(s)	Score
Men's singles	(United States) Vitas Gerulaitis	(United Kingdom) John Lloyd	6–3, 7–6^{(7–4)}, 5–7, 3–6, 6–2 (Note: It was Gerulaitis's 1st (and only) career Grand Slam title.)
Women's singles	(Australia) Evonne Goolagong Cawley	(Australia) Helen Gourlay Cawley	6–3, 6–0 (Note: It was Goolagong Cawley's 6th career Grand Slam title.)
Men's doubles	(Australia) Ray Ruffels (Australia) Allan Stone	(Australia) John Alexander (Australia) Phil Dent	7–6, 7–6
Women's doubles	(Australia) Evonne Goolagong Cawley and (United States) Mona Schallau Guerrant (Australia) Helen Gourlay Cawley and (Australia) Kerry Melville Reid		shared due to rained out final
Mixed doubles	Competition not held between 1970 and 1986.		

== French Open ==
Category	Champion(s)	Finalist(s)	Score
Men's singles	(Argentina) Guillermo Vilas	(United States) Brian Gottfried	6–0, 6–3, 6–0 (Note: It was Vilas's 1st career Grand Slam title.)
Women's singles	(Socialist Federal Republic of Yugoslavia) Mima Jaušovec (Note: Jaušovec became the first player (male or female) from Yugoslavia to win the French Open singles crown.)	(Romania) Florența Mihai	6–2, 6–7^{(5–7)}, 6–1 (Note: It was Jaušovec's only career Grand Slam title.)
Men's doubles	(United States) Brian Gottfried (Mexico) Raúl Ramírez	(Poland) Wojciech Fibak (Czechoslovakia) Jan Kodeš	7–6, 4–6, 6–3, 6–4
Women's doubles	(Czechoslovakia) Regina Maršíková (United States) Pam Teeguarden	(United States) Rayni Fox (Australia) Helen Gourlay	5–7, 6–4, 6–2
Mixed doubles	(United States) Mary Carillo (United States) John McEnroe	(Romania) Florența Mihai (Colombia) Iván Molina	7–6, 6–4

== Wimbledon ==
Category	Champion(s)	Finalist(s)	Score
Men's singles	(Sweden) Björn Borg	(United States) Jimmy Connors	3–6, 6–2, 6–1, 5–7, 6–4 (Note: It was Borg's second consecutive Wimbledon title and 4th Grand Slam title overall.)
Women's singles	(United Kingdom) Virginia Wade	(Netherlands) Betty Stöve	4–6, 6–3, 6–1 (Note: It was Wade's first and only Wimbledon title, third and final Grand Slam title overall. Wade remains the last British woman to win the singles title at Wimbledon.)
Men's doubles	(Australia) Ross Case (Australia) Geoff Masters	(Australia) John Alexander (Australia) Phil Dent	6–3, 6–4, 3–6, 8–9^{(4–7)}, 6–4
Women's doubles	(Australia) Helen Cawley (United States) JoAnne Russell	(United States) Martina Navratilova (Netherlands) Betty Stöve	6–3, 6–3
Mixed doubles	(South Africa) Bob Hewitt (South Africa) Greer Stevens	(South Africa) Frew McMillan (Netherlands) Betty Stöve	3–6, 7–5, 6–4

== US Open ==
Category	Champion(s)	Finalist(s)	Score
Men's singles	(Argentina) Guillermo Vilas	(United States) Jimmy Connors	2–6, 6–3, 7–6^{(7-4)}, 6–0 (Note: It was Vilas's 2nd career Grand Slam title, and his 1st (and only) US Open title. He was the first Argentine tennis player to win the US Open.)
Women's singles	(United States) Chris Evert	(Australia) Wendy Turnbull	7–6, 6–2 (Note: It was Evert's 7th career Grand Slam title, and her 3rd (consecutive) US Open title.)
Men's doubles	(South Africa) Bob Hewitt (South Africa) Frew McMillan	(United States) Brian Gottfried (Mexico) Raúl Ramírez	6–4, 6–0
Women's doubles	(United States) Martina Navratilova (Netherlands) Betty Stöve	(United States) Renee Richards (United States) Betty-Ann Stuart	6–1, 7–6
Mixed doubles	(Netherlands) Betty Stöve (South Africa) Frew McMillan	(United States) Billie Jean King (United States) Vitas Gerulaitis	6–2, 3–6, 6–3
