= 1977 Australian Open (January) – Men's singles qualifying =

Men's singles qualifying
- 1977 Australian Open (January)

Events
Singles	men	women
Doubles	men	women

Qualification
Singles	men	women
- Australian Open (January)

This article displays the qualifying draw for men's singles at the 1977 Australian Open (January).

== Qualifiers ==
1. (United States) Tim Wilkison
2. (United States) William Lofgren
3. (Australia) Warren Maher
4. (Australia) Peter Campbell
5. (Australia) Charlie Fancutt
6. (Australia) John Trickey
7. (Australia) Graeme Thomson
8. (Australia) William Lloyd

== Lucky losers ==
1. (West Germany) Harald Elschenbroich
2. (United States) Mark Meyers

== Qualifying draw ==
Key

- Q = Qualifier
- WC = Wild card
- LL = Lucky loser
- Alt = Alternate
- ITF = ITF entry
- PR = Protected ranking
- SR = Special ranking
- SE = Special exempt
- JE = Junior exempt
- JR = Junior Accelerator Programme entrant
- CO = College Accelerator Programme entrant
- NG = Next Gen Accelerator Program entrant
- w/o = Walkover
- r = Retired
- d = Defaulted

=== First qualifier ===
First round
(West Germany) Rolf Gehring	4	6	3
(Australia) Wayne Cowley	6	1	6
(United States) Tim Wilkison	7	6
(Australia) Robert Casey	5	3

Qualifying competition
(Australia) Wayne Cowley	3	4
(United States) Tim Wilkison	6	6

=== Second qualifier ===
First round
(United States) William Lofgren	5	6	6
(Australia) Ernie Ewert	7	3	4
(United States) Joel Bailey	7	2	4
(Australia) Tim Clements	6	6	6

Qualifying competition
(United States) William Lofgren	6	6
(Australia) Tim Clements	4	2

=== Third qualifier ===
First round
(Australia) Warren Maher	4	7	6
(Australia) Dale Collings	6	6	3
(Austria) Peter Feigl	5	3
(United States) Mark Meyers	7	6

Qualifying competition
(Australia) Warren Maher	6	6
(United States) Mark Meyers	3	3

=== Fourth qualifier ===
First round
(West Germany) Klaus Eberhard	4	6
(Australia) Will Coghlan	6	7
(Greece) Nicolas Kelaidis	1	1
(Australia) Peter Campbell	6	6

Qualifying competition
(Australia) Will Coghlan	1	3
(Australia) Peter Campbell	6	6

=== Fifth qualifier ===
First round
(Australia) David Carter	2	6	4
(United Kingdom) Jonathan Smith	6	4	6
(Australia) Greg Braun	6	4
(Australia) Charlie Fancutt	7	6

Qualifying competition
(United Kingdom) Jonathan Smith	6	7	1
(Australia) Charlie Fancutt	7	6	6

=== Sixth qualifier ===
First round
(Australia) William Durham	3	5
(West Germany) Harald Elschenbroich	6	7
(Australia) John Trickey	7	6
(United States) Dean Martin	6	2

Qualifying competition
(West Germany) Harald Elschenbroich	6	6	3
(Australia) John Trickey	7	3	6

=== Seventh qualifier ===
First round
(Australia) Graeme Thomson	1	7	6
(United States) John Holladay	6	6	3
(Australia) Trevor Little	2	4
(West Germany) Peter Elter	6	6

Qualifying competition
(Australia) Graeme Thomson	6	3	6
(West Germany) Peter Elter	4	6	1

=== Eighth qualifier ===
First round
(Australia) Jeff Tobin	1	0
(Australia) William Lloyd	6	6
(Iran) Mansour Bahrami	5	3
(United States) Stephen Mott	7	6

Qualifying competition
(Australia) William Lloyd	6	6
(United States) Stephen Mott	4	4
