= 1976 Wimbledon Championships – Women's singles qualifying =

Women's singles qualifying
- 1976 Wimbledon Championships

Events
Singles	men	women		boys	girls
Doubles	men	women	mixed	boys	girls
WC Singles	men	women	quad
WC Doubles	men	women	quad
Legends	men	women	seniors

Qualification
Singles	men	women
Doubles	men	women	mixed
- Wimbledon Championships

Players who neither had high enough rankings nor received wild cards to enter the main draw of the annual Wimbledon Tennis Championships participated in a qualifying tournament held one week before the event.

== Qualifiers ==
1. (Sweden) Mimmi Wikstedt
2. (United States) Patricia Bostrom
3. (Australia) Christine Mattison
4. (United States) Mary McLean
5. (United Kingdom) Corinne Molesworth
6. (United States) Aleida Spex
7. (Australia) Vicki Lancaster-Kerr
8. (United States) Ceci Martinez

== Lucky losers ==
1. (United Kingdom) Anthea Cooper

== Qualifying draw ==
Key

- Q = Qualifier
- WC = Wild card
- LL = Lucky loser
- Alt = Alternate
- ITF = ITF entry
- PR = Protected ranking
- SR = Special ranking
- SE = Special exempt
- JE = Junior exempt
- JR = Junior Accelerator Programme entrant
- CO = College Accelerator Programme entrant
- NG = Next Gen Accelerator Program entrant
- w/o = Walkover
- r = Retired
- d = Defaulted

=== First qualifier ===
First round
1	(Sweden) Mimmi Wikstedt	6	6
8	(South Africa) Pendlebury	4	2
4	(New Zealand) Sim	6	6
5	(United Kingdom) Linda Geeves	4	0
2	(Australia) Diane Evers	7	6
7	(Czechoslovakia) Eva Sedláková	5	3
3	(South Africa) Daphne Pattison	6	6
6	(Brazil) Andrade-Hoffman	3	2

Second round
(Sweden) Mimmi Wikstedt	6	6
(New Zealand) Sim	1	2
(Australia) Diane Evers	6	6
(South Africa) Daphne Pattison	3	1

Qualifying competition
(Sweden) Mimmi Wikstedt	6	6
(Australia) Diane Evers	4	1

=== Second qualifier ===
First round
1	(United States) Patricia Bostrom	6	6
8	(Czechoslovakia) Alena Palmeova-West	1	3
4	(Italy) Daniela Porzio	6	6
5	(New Zealand) Judy Connor	4	3
2	(Australia) Jan Wilton	6	2	6
7	(Italy) Antonella Rosa	1	6	1
3	(Switzerland) Annemarie Rüegg	6	8	7
6	(United Kingdom) Cathy Drury	3	9	5

Second round
(United States) Patricia Bostrom	3	6	7
(Italy) Daniela Porzio	6	4	5
(Australia) Jan Wilton	6	6
(Switzerland) Annemarie Rüegg	2	3

Qualifying competition
(United States) Patricia Bostrom	5	6	8
(Australia) Jan Wilton	7	1	6

=== Third qualifier ===
First round
1	(Australia) Christine Mattison	9	6
8	(Sweden) Nina Bohm	8	2
4	(Australia) Carol Sherriff	6	6
5	(United Kingdom) Charlotte Bastin	4	2
3	(Switzerland) Monica Simmen	1	7	6
6	(United Kingdom) Julia Lloyd	6	5	3

Second round
(Australia) Christine Mattison	6	6
(Australia) Carol Sherriff	2	1
(Australia) Sue Saliba	6	6
(Switzerland) Monica Simmen	4	2

Qualifying competition
(Australia) Christine Mattison	6	6
(Australia) Sue Saliba	1	0

=== Fourth qualifier ===
First round
1	(United States) Mary McLean	6	2	7
8	(United States) Jane Stratton	4	6	5
4	(United Kingdom) Clare Harrison	6	6
5	(Sweden) Stenberg	4	2
2	(United Kingdom) Anthea Cooper	6	6
7	(Japan) Murata	0	2
3	Arnold	4	6	6
6	(Australia) Kaye Hallam	6	4	1

Second round
(United States) Mary McLean	6	7	6
(United Kingdom) Clare Harrison	3	9	4
(United Kingdom) Anthea Cooper	7	6
Arnold	5	4

Qualifying competition
(United States) Mary McLean	6	1	6
(United Kingdom) Anthea Cooper	4	6	3

=== Fifth qualifier ===
First round
1	(United Kingdom) Corinne Molesworth	6	6
8	(New Zealand) Sally Chapman	2	3
4	(Belgium) Monique Van Haver	2	8	6
5	(Argentina) Susana Maria Villaverde	6	6	3
2	(Australia) Nerida Gregory	4	6	8
7	(New Zealand) Pauline Elliott	6	3	6
3	(Australia) Gwen Stirton	3	8	6
6	(France) Brigitte Simon	6	6	1

Second round
(United Kingdom) Corinne Molesworth	6	7
(Belgium) Monique Van Haver	4	5
(Australia) Nerida Gregory	6	6
(Australia) Gwen Stirton	2	2

Qualifying competition
(United Kingdom) Corinne Molesworth	6	5	7
(Australia) Nerida Gregory	3	7	5

=== Sixth qualifier ===
First round
1	(United States) Aleida Spex	8	6
8	(Australia) Michelle Pekovitch	6	3
4	(Australia) Kym Ruddell	6	6
5	(United Kingdom) Charlotte Leatham	2	4
2	(Australia) Jenny Walker	6	6
7	(Japan) Y. Watanabe	3	0
3	(United Kingdom) Jill Cottrell	1	6	6
6	(Australia) Pam Whytcross	6	4	3

Second round
(United States) Aleida Spex	5	6	6
(Australia) Kym Ruddell	7	4	1
(Australia) Jenny Walker	6	6
(United Kingdom) Jill Cottrell	1	2

Qualifying competition
(United States) Aleida Spex	8	6	6
(Australia) Jenny Walker	9	2	2

=== Seventh qualifier ===
First round
1	(Australia) Vicki Lancaster-Kerr	6	6
8	(Australia) Sue Hole	0	1
4	(United States) Sally Greer	6	1	6
5	(Czechoslovakia) Miloslava Holubová	4	6	4
2	(New Zealand) Chris Newton	6	6
7	(South Africa) Lorna Whitfield	2	3
3	(United Kingdom) Debbie Jevans	8	7
6	(New Zealand) L.M. Harris	6	5

Second round
(Australia) Vicki Lancaster-Kerr	8	6
(United States) Sally Greer	6	2
(New Zealand) Chris Newton	6	6
(United Kingdom) Debbie Jevans	4	2

Qualifying competition
(Australia) Vicki Lancaster-Kerr	7	5	6
(New Zealand) Chris Newton	5	7	1

=== Eighth qualifier ===
First round
1	(United States) Ceci Martinez	6	6
8	(United States) Beverly Buckley	2	2
4	(South Africa) Tanya Harford	6	6
5	(Brazil) Wanda Ferraz	0	1
2	(Australia) Chris O'Neil	6	6
7	(South Africa) L. Raymond	2	1
3	(Australia) J.R. Morton	7	5	7
6	(United Kingdom) Anne Hobbs	5	7	5

Second round
(United States) Ceci Martinez	6	8
(South Africa) Tanya Harford	1	6
(Australia) Chris O'Neil	6	6
(Australia) J.R. Morton	2	4

Qualifying competition
(United States) Ceci Martinez	6	7
(Australia) Chris O'Neil	1	5
