= 1977 Australian Open (January) – Women's singles qualifying =

Women's singles qualifying
- 1977 Australian Open (January)

Events
Singles	men	women
Doubles	men	women

Qualification
Singles	men	women
- Australian Open (January)

This article displays the qualifying draw for women's singles at the 1977 Australian Open (January).

== Seeds ==
1. (United States) Donna Stockton (second round)
2. (Australia) Pamela Baily (qualified)
3. (Australia) Kerryn Pratt (second round)
4. (Australia) Mary Sawyer (qualified)
5. (Australia) Leanne Harrison (qualifying competition)
6. (Australia) Kaye Hallam (first round)
7. (United States) Valerie Franta (first round)
8. (Australia) Carol Zeeman (qualified)

== Qualifiers ==
1. (Australia) Carol Zeeman
2. (Australia) Mary Sawyer
3. (Australia) Amanda Tobin
4. (Australia) Pamela Baily

== Qualifying draw ==
Key

- Q = Qualifier
- WC = Wild card
- LL = Lucky loser
- Alt = Alternate
- ITF = ITF entry
- PR = Protected ranking
- SR = Special ranking
- SE = Special exempt
- JE = Junior exempt
- JR = Junior Accelerator Programme entrant
- CO = College Accelerator Programme entrant
- NG = Next Gen Accelerator Program entrant
- w/o = Walkover
- r = Retired
- d = Defaulted

=== First qualifier ===
First round
1	(United States) Donna Stockton	2	6	6
(Australia) Jennifer Fenwick	6	2	2
(Australia) Merrilyn Robinson	6	6
(Australia) J. Tobin	4	3
(Australia) Michelle Berrigan	2	3
(Australia) Kerry Neill	6	6
(Japan) Miyoko Sugawara	3	0
8	(Australia) Carol Zeeman	6	6

Second round
1	(United States) Donna Stockton	7	5	2^{r}
(Australia) Merrilyn Robinson	5	7	1
(Australia) Kerry Neill	3	4
8	(Australia) Carol Zeeman	6	6

Qualifying competition
(Australia) Merrilyn Robinson	2	6
8	(Australia) Carol Zeeman	6	7

=== Second qualifier ===
First round
4	(Australia) Mary Sawyer	6	6
(Australia) Sue Saliba	4	4
(Australia) Diane Eastburn	6	6
(Australia) L. Griffiths	3	0
(Australia) Karen Gulley	1	4
(Australia) Sharon Pinchbeck	6	6
(Australia) Donna Kelly	2	1
5	(Australia) Leanne Harrison	6	6

Second round
4	(Australia) Mary Sawyer	6	6
(Australia) Diane Eastburn	4	4
(Australia) Sharon Pinchbeck	3	1
5	(Australia) Leanne Harrison	6	6

Qualifying competition
4	(Australia) Mary Sawyer	6	7
5	(Australia) Leanne Harrison	4	5

=== Third qualifier ===
First round
6	(Australia) Kaye Hallam	4	4
(Australia) Kerry Ballard	6	6
(Australia) Amanda Tobin	6	6
(Australia) Sue Chancellor	0	0
(Australia) Amanda Pryor	0	3
(Australia) Dianne Berkinshaw	6	6
(Australia) Andrea Galloway	6	3	1
3	(Australia) Kerryn Pratt	2	6	6

Second round
(Australia) Kerry Ballard	3	5
(Australia) Amanda Tobin	6	7
(Australia) Dianne Berkinshaw	6	6
3	(Australia) Kerryn Pratt	2	4

Qualifying competition
(Australia) Amanda Tobin	4	7	6
(Australia) Dianne Berkinshaw	6	5	2

=== Fourth qualifier ===
First round
7	(United States) Valerie Franta	7	2	2
(Australia) Michelle Pekovitch	5	6	6
(Australia) Rosalyn McCann	6	6
(Japan) Eri Murata	4	2
(Australia) M. Berta	7	2	3
(Australia) Carol Draper	5	6	6
(Australia) V. Von Demleaux	2	1
2	(Australia) Pamela Baily	6	6

Second round
(Australia) Michelle Pekovitch	6	6
(Australia) Rosalyn McCann	2	3
(Australia) Carol Draper	2	3
2	(Australia) Pamela Baily	6	6

Qualifying competition
(Australia) Michelle Pekovitch	4	6	1
2	(Australia) Pamela Baily	6	4	6
