= 1977 Australian Open (December) – Women's singles qualifying =

Women's singles qualifying
- 1977 Australian Open (December)

Events
Singles	men	women
Doubles	men	women

Qualification
Singles	men	women
- Australian Open (December)

This article displays the qualifying draw for women's singles at the 1977 Australian Open (December).

== Seeds ==
1. (Australia) Sharon Pinchbeck (qualified)
2. (Australia) Kerryn Pratt (qualified)
3. (Australia) Judy Tegart-Dalton (qualified)
4. (Australia) Susan Leo (qualified)
5. (Australia) Karen Gulley (qualifying competition, lucky loser)
6. (Australia) Jenny Walker (qualifying competition)
7. (United States) Leslie Allen (qualifying competition)
8. (Australia) Kerry Neill (first round)

== Qualifiers ==
1. (Australia) Sharon Pinchbeck
2. (Australia) Susan Leo
3. (Australia) Judy Tegart-Dalton
4. (Australia) Kerryn Pratt

== Lucky losers ==
1. (Australia) Karen Gulley

== Qualifying draw ==
Key

- Q = Qualifier
- WC = Wild card
- LL = Lucky loser
- Alt = Alternate
- ITF = ITF entry
- PR = Protected ranking
- SR = Special ranking
- SE = Special exempt
- JE = Junior exempt
- JR = Junior Accelerator Programme entrant
- CO = College Accelerator Programme entrant
- NG = Next Gen Accelerator Program entrant
- w/o = Walkover
- r = Retired
- d = Defaulted

=== First qualifier ===
First round
1	(Australia) Sharon Pinchbeck	6	6
(Australia) S. Matthews	2	3
(Australia) C. Crawford	6	6
(Australia) K. Leslie	0	1
(Australia) Wendy Pearson	3	6
(Australia) Donna Kelly	6	7
(Australia) J. Carey	6	6
8	(Australia) Kerry Neill	3	1

Second round
1	(Australia) Sharon Pinchbeck	6	6
(Australia) C. Crawford	4	4
(Australia) Donna Kelly	6	6
(Australia) J. Carey	2	3

Qualifying competition
1	(Australia) Sharon Pinchbeck	6	6
(Australia) Donna Kelly	0	0

=== Second qualifier ===
First round
4	(Australia) Susan Leo	6	6
(Australia) Amanda Pryor	1	1
(Australia) Dianne Berkinshaw	6	7
(Australia) Helen Rice	2	6
(Singapore) Evelyn Lim	1	3
(Australia) Kerry Ballard	6	6
(Australia) Lois Raymond	4	4
5	(Australia) Karen Gulley	6	6

Second round
4	(Australia) Susan Leo	7	6
(Australia) Dianne Berkinshaw	5	4
(Australia) Kerry Ballard	2	1
5	(Australia) Karen Gulley	6	6

Qualifying competition
4	(Australia) Susan Leo	6	6
5	(Australia) Karen Gulley	2	3

=== Third qualifier ===
First round
6	(Australia) Jenny Walker	7	6
(Australia) Merrilyn Robinson	6	4
(Australia) Gwen Stirton	6	6
(Australia) M. Earl	1	1
(Australia) Julie Peters	3	2
(Australia) Michelle Berrigan	6	6
(Australia) C. McQuaide	0	0
3	(Australia) Judy Tegart-Dalton	6	6

Second round
6	(Australia) Jenny Walker	6	7
(Australia) Gwen Stirton	4	6
(Australia) Michelle Berrigan	5	1
3	(Australia) Judy Tegart-Dalton	7	6

Qualifying competition
6	(Australia) Jenny Walker	2	7	0
3	(Australia) Judy Tegart-Dalton	6	5	6

=== Fourth qualifier ===
First round
7	(United States) Leslie Allen	6	7
(Australia) Diane Eastburn	3	5
(Australia) L. Middleton	6	6
(Australia) G. Thacker	1	0
(Australia) G. Ayre	5	3
(Australia) Sue Chancellor	7	6
(Australia) Cathy Griffiths	0	3
2	(Australia) Kerryn Pratt	6	6

Second round
7	(United States) Leslie Allen	6	5	6
(Australia) Leanne Middleton	3	7	2
(Australia) Sue Chancellor	2	6	2
2	(Australia) Kerryn Pratt	6	4	6

Qualifying competition
7	(United States) Leslie Allen	2	6
2	(Australia) Kerryn Pratt	6	7
