= 1977 Australian Open – Women's singles =

There were two Australian Opens in 1977:

- 1977 Australian Open (January) – Women's Singles
- 1977 Australian Open (December) – Women's Singles
