= 1977 Australian Open =

1977 Australian Open may refer to:

- 1977 Australian Open (January)
- 1977 Australian Open (December)
