= Mark Meyers =

Mark Meyers may refer to:

- Mark Meyers (tennis) (born 1953), American tennis player
- Mark Meyers, former member of Belgian rock band Deus

== See also ==
- Mark Myers, American geologist
