= 1977 Australian Open (December) – Women's doubles =

Women's doubles
- 1977 Australian Open (December)

Final
- Champions: (Australia) Evonne Cawley (Australia) Helen Gourlay (United States) Mona Guerrant (Australia) Kerry Reid

Details
- Draw: 16
- Seeds: 4

Events
Singles	men	women
Doubles	men	women
- Australian Open (December)

Dianne Fromholtz and Helen Gourlay were the defending champions.

== Seeds ==
1. (Australia) Evonne Cawley / (Australia) Helen Cawley (champions)
2. (United States) Mona Guerrant / (Australia) Kerry Reid (champions)
3. (Sweden) Helena Anliot / (United Kingdom) Sue Barker (first round)
4. (Australia) Christine Matison / (Australia) Pam Whytcross (semifinals)

== Draw ==
Key

- Q = Qualifier
- WC = Wild card
- LL = Lucky loser
- Alt = Alternate
- ITF = ITF entry
- PR = Protected ranking
- SR = Special ranking
- SE = Special exempt
- JE = Junior exempt
- JR = Junior Accelerator Programme entrant
- CO = College Accelerator Programme entrant
- NG = Next Gen Accelerator Program entrant
- w/o = Walkover
- r = Retired
- d = Defaulted

First round
1	(Australia) E Cawley (Australia) H Cawley	6	6
(Australia) S Saliba (Australia) M Sawyer	4	1
(Australia) C Draper (Australia) E Little	6	3
(Australia) J Dalton (Australia) D Evers	7	6
(Australia) N Gregory (Australia) J Wilton	6	6
(Australia) K Gulley (Australia) S Pinchbeck	0	2
(United States) P Bostrom (Australia) K Ruddell	6	6
3	(Sweden) H Anliot (United Kingdom) S Barker	3	2
4	(Australia) C Matison (Australia) P Whytcross	6	6
(Australia) K Ballard (Australia) K Hallam	4	4
(Australia) W Paish (Japan) N Sato	7	4	6
(United States) R Fox (United States) K Harter	6	6	3
(Australia) L Harrison (Australia) M Pekovitch	3	4
(Australia) K Pratt (Australia) A Tobin	6	6
(United Kingdom) C Drury (Australia) S Leo	0	1
2	(United States) M Guerrant (Australia) K Reid	6	6

Quarterfinals
1	(Australia) E Cawley (Australia) H Cawley	6	7
(Australia) J Dalton (Australia) D Evers	0	5
(Australia) N Gregory (Australia) J Wilton	3	6	4
(United States) P Bostrom (Australia) K Ruddell	6	3	6
4	(Australia) C Matison (Australia) P Whytcross	6	6
(Australia) W Paish (Japan) N Sato	1	2
(Australia) K Pratt (Australia) A Tobin	2	2
2	(United States) M Guerrant (Australia) K Reid	6	6

Semifinals
1	(Australia) E Cawley (Australia) H Cawley	6	6
(United States) P Bostrom (Australia) K Ruddell	3	4
4	(Australia) C Matison (Australia) P Whytcross	2	1
2	(United States) M Guerrant (Australia) K Reid	6	6

Final
1	(Australia) E Cawley (Australia) H Cawley
2	(United States) M Guerrant (Australia) K Reid
