= 1977 Australian Open (December) – Men's doubles =

Men's doubles
- 1977 Australian Open (December)

Final
- Champion: (Australia) Ray Ruffels (Australia) Allan Stone
- Runner-up: (Australia) John Alexander (Australia) Phil Dent
- Score: 7–6, 7–6

Details
- Draw: 32
- Seeds: 8

Events
Singles	men	women
Doubles	men	women
- Australian Open (December)

Arthur Ashe and Tony Roche were the defending champions. Ray Ruffels and Allan Stone defeated John Alexander and Phil Dent in the final, 7–6, 7–6.

== Seeds ==
1. (Australia) John Alexander / (Australia) Phil Dent (final)
2. (Australia) Syd Ball / (Australia) Kim Warwick (second round)
3. (Australia) John Newcombe / (Australia) Tony Roche (quarterfinals)
4. (United States) Tim Gullikson / (Australia) Geoff Masters (quarterfinals)
5. (Australia) Cliff Letcher / (United States) Stan Smith (semifinals)
6. (Australia) Colin Dibley / (Australia) Chris Kachel (semifinals)
7. (Australia) Ray Ruffels / (Australia) Allan Stone (champion)
8. (New Zealand) Brian Fairlie / (West Germany) Karl Meiler (quarterfinals)

== Draw ==
Key

- Q = Qualifier
- WC = Wild card
- LL = Lucky loser
- Alt = Alternate
- ITF = ITF entry
- PR = Protected ranking
- SR = Special ranking
- SE = Special exempt
- JE = Junior exempt
- JR = Junior Accelerator Programme entrant
- CO = College Accelerator Programme entrant
- NG = Next Gen Accelerator Program entrant
- w/o = Walkover
- r = Retired
- d = Defaulted

=== Finals ===
Semifinals
1	(Australia) John Alexander (Australia) Phil Dent	7	6
6	(Australia) Colin Dibley (Australia) Chris Kachel	6	3
5	(Australia) Cliff Letcher (United States) Stan Smith	6	6	3
7	(Australia) Ray Ruffels (Australia) Allan Stone	7	4	6

Final
1	(Australia) John Alexander (Australia) Phil Dent	6	6
7	(Australia) Ray Ruffels (Australia) Allan Stone	7	7

=== Top half ===
First round
1	(Australia) J Alexander (Australia) P Dent	7	6
(Australia) G Braun (Australia) D Collings	5	1
(Australia) S Docherty (United States) E Teltscher	6	2
(France) C Casa (France) G Moretton	7	6
(Australia) M Anderson (Australia) B Drewett	6	6
(Australia) A Gardiner (Australia) B Giltinan	3	4
(Australia) P Campbell (France) J Thamin	3	3
8	(New Zealand) B Fairlie (West Germany) K Meiler	6	6
6	(Australia) C Dibley (Australia) C Kachel	6	7
(Australia) B Carmichael (New Zealand) C Lewis	0	6
(Australia) T Clements (Australia) T Stone	6	3	2
(Australia) J Marks (United States) B Scanlon	4	6	6
(Australia) V Eke (United States) C Sylvan	6	4	6
(United Kingdom) J Feaver (Australia) J James	3	6	4
(Australia) D Carter (Australia) W Maher	5	4
4	(United States) T Gullikson (Australia) G Masters	7	6

Second round
1	(Australia) J Alexander (Australia) P Dent	4	6	6
(France) C Casa (France) G Moretton	6	3	3
(Australia) M Anderson (Australia) B Drewett	3	5
8	(New Zealand) B Fairlie (West Germany) K Meiler	6	7
6	(Australia) C Dibley (Australia) C Kachel	6	6
(Australia) J Marks (United States) B Scanlon	4	4
(Australia) V Eke (United States) C Sylvan	4	4
4	(United States) T Gullikson (Australia) G Masters	6	6

Quarterfinals
1	(Australia) J Alexander (Australia) P Dent	4	6	12
8	(New Zealand) B Fairlie (West Germany) K Meiler	6	4	10
6	(Australia) C Dibley (Australia) C Kachel	6	6
4	(United States) T Gullikson (Australia) G Masters	4	4

Semifinals
1	(Australia) J Alexander (Australia) P Dent	7	6
6	(Australia) C Dibley (Australia) C Kachel	6	3

=== Bottom half ===
First round
3	(Australia) J Newcombe (Australia) T Roche	6	6
(Australia) T Little (Australia) N Phillips	3	4
(Australia) P Dougherty (Australia) R Kelly	3	2
(Australia) J Bartlett (Australia) T Rocavert	6	6
(United States) S Carnahan (Australia) B Phillips-Moore	4	7	3
(Australia) C Fancutt (Australia) L Hall	6	6	6
(Australia) S Clarke (Australia) W Durham	3	3
5	(Australia) C Letcher (United States) S Smith	6	6
7	(Australia) R Ruffels (Australia) A Stone	6	6
(Australia) W Lloyd (Australia) P McNamee	3	1
(Venezuela) J Andrew (United States) W Lofgren	6	4
(United States) W Blocher (United States) G Hardie	7	6
(Australia) R Frawley (Australia) G Thomson	4	5
(United Kingdom) R Drysdale (United Kingdom) R Lewis	6	7
(Australia) P McNamara (Australia) J Trickey	1	4
2	(Australia) S Ball (Australia) K Warwick	6	6

Second round
3	(Australia) J Newcombe (Australia) T Roche	6	6
(Australia) J Bartlett (Australia) T Rocavert	3	4
(Australia) C Fancutt (Australia) L Hall	2	2
5	(Australia) C Letcher (United States) S Smith	6	6
7	(Australia) R Ruffels (Australia) A Stone	7	7
(United States) W Blocher (United States) G Hardie	6	6
(United Kingdom) R Drysdale (United Kingdom) R Lewis	6	6
2	(Australia) S Ball (Australia) K Warwick	4	3

Quarterfinals
3	(Australia) J Newcombe (Australia) T Roche	3	6	7
5	(Australia) C Letcher (United States) S Smith	6	3	9
7	(Australia) R Ruffels (Australia) A Stone	6	7
(United Kingdom) R Drysdale (United Kingdom) R Lewis	3	5

Semifinals
5	(Australia) C Letcher (United States) S Smith	6	6	3
7	(Australia) R Ruffels (Australia) A Stone	7	4	6
