= 1977 Australian Open (December) – Women's singles =

Women's singles
- 1977 Australian Open (December)

Final
- Champion: (Australia) Evonne Goolagong
- Runner-up: (Australia) Helen Gourlay Cawley
- Score: 6–3, 6–0

Details
- Draw: 32 (4 Q )
- Seeds: 8

Events
Singles	men	women
Doubles	men	women
- Australian Open (December)

Evonne Goolagong defeated Helen Gourlay Cawley in the final, 6–3, 6–0 to win the women's singles tennis title at the December 1977 Australian Open. It was her fourth Australian Open singles title and sixth major singles title overall. For the third time in her career, Goolagong did not lose a set during the tournament.

Kerry Reid was the defending champion, but was defeated in the semifinals by Goolagong.

Both finalists were entered in the championships as Mrs. R. Cawley, as they were married to Roger Cawley and Richard Cawley (who were not related) respectively (at the time, married female players were required to be identified using their husband's name). The umpire became confused during the early stages of the final and simply referred to the players as Evonne or Helen to avoid confusion.

The second of the two Australian Opens held in 1977 started on 19 December and ended on 31 December. For the first Australian Open held in 1977, see: 1977 Australian Open (January).

== Seeds ==
The seeded players are listed below. Evonne Goolagong is the champion; others show the round in which they were eliminated.

1. (Australia) Evonne Goolagong (champion)
2. (United Kingdom) Sue Barker (semifinal)
3. (Australia) Kerry Reid (semifinal)
4. (United States) Mona Guerrant (Quarterfinal)
5. (Australia) Helen Gourlay (final)
6. (Sweden) Helena Anliot (first round)
7. (United States) Kathleen Harter (Quarterfinal)
8. (United States) Rayni Fox (Quarterfinal)

== Draw ==
Key

- Q = Qualifier
- WC = Wild card
- LL = Lucky loser
- Alt = Alternate
- ITF = ITF entry
- PR = Protected ranking
- SR = Special ranking
- SE = Special exempt
- JE = Junior exempt
- JR = Junior Accelerator Programme entrant
- CO = College Accelerator Programme entrant
- NG = Next Gen Accelerator Program entrant
- w/o = Walkover
- r = Retired
- d = Defaulted

=== Finals ===
Semifinals
1	(Australia) Evonne Goolagong	6	6
3	(Australia) Kerry Reid	1	3
5	(Australia) Helen Gourlay	7	6
2	(United Kingdom) Sue Barker	5	4

Final
1	(Australia) Evonne Goolagong	6	6
5	(Australia) Helen Gourlay	3	0

=== Top half ===
First round
1	(Australia) E Goolagong	6	6
(Australia) D Evers	1	3
(Australia) M Sawyer	3	4
(Japan) N Sato	6	6
(Australia) K Hallam	5	6	7
(New Zealand) P Elliott	7	4	5
Q	(Australia) J Dalton	7	6
6	(Sweden) H Anliot	6	2
3	(Australia) K Reid	6	6
Q	(Australia) K Pratt	4	2
LL	(Australia) K Gulley	6	0	3
(Australia) L Harrison	4	6	6
(Australia) C Draper	2	2
(Australia) J Wilton	6	6
(Australia) S Saliba	1	5
7	(United States) K Harter	6	7

Second round
1	(Australia) E Goolagong	6	6
(Japan) N Sato	4	0
(Australia) K Hallam	0	3
Q	(Australia) J Dalton	6	6
3	(Australia) K Reid	6	6
(Australia) L Harrison	0	0
(Australia) J Wilton	2	3
7	(United States) K Harter	6	6

Quarterfinals
1	(Australia) E Goolagong	6	6
Q	(Australia) J Dalton	3	1
3	(Australia) K Reid	6	7
7	(United States) K Harter	1	5

Semifinals
1	(Australia) E Goolagong	6	6
3	(Australia) K Reid	1	3

=== Bottom half ===
First round
5	(Australia) H Gourlay	6	6
(Australia) W Paish	1	3
(Australia) E Little	6	6
(Australia) K Ruddell	2	3
(Australia) M Pekovitch	4	3
(Australia) A Tobin	6	6
Q	(Australia) S Leo	2	1
4	(United States) M Guerrant	6	6
8	(United States) R Fox	6	6
(Australia) C Matison	2	1
(United States) P Bostrom	6	4	9
(Australia) P Whytcross	3	6	7
Q	(Australia) S Pinchbeck	5	1
(Australia) N Gregory	7	6
(United Kingdom) C Drury	3	2
2	(United Kingdom) S Barker	6	6

Second round
5	(Australia) H Gourlay	6	6
(Australia) E Little	0	1
(Australia) A Tobin	6	2
4	(United States) M Guerrant	7	6
8	(United States) R Fox	7	6	7
(United States) P Bostrom	5	7	5
(Australia) N Gregory	5	3
2	(United Kingdom) S Barker	7	6

Quarterfinals
5	(Australia) H Gourlay	3	6	6
4	(United States) M Guerrant	6	1	4
8	(United States) R Fox	3	0
2	(United Kingdom) S Barker	6	6

Semifinals
5	(Australia) H Gourlay	7	6
2	(United Kingdom) S Barker	5	4

== See also ==
- 1977 Australian Open (December)

Preceded by 1977 US Open – Women's singles	Grand Slam women's singles	Succeeded by 1978 French Open – Women's singles
