= 1979 Wimbledon Championships – Women's singles =

Women's singles
- 1979 Wimbledon Championships

Final
- Champion: (United States) Martina Navratilova
- Runner-up: (United States) Chris Evert Lloyd
- Score: 6–4, 6–4

Details
- Draw: 96 (8Q / 6WC)
- Seeds: 16

Events
Singles	men	women		boys	girls
Doubles	men	women	mixed	boys	girls
← 1978 ·	Wimbledon Championships	· 1980 →

Defending champion Martina Navratilova defeated Chris Evert-Lloyd in a rematch of the previous year's final, 6–4, 6–4 to win the ladies' singles tennis title at the 1979 Wimbledon Championships. It was her second Wimbledon singles title and second major singles title overall.

== Seeds ==
1. (United States) Martina Navratilova (champion)
2. (United States) Chris Evert Lloyd (final)
3. (Australia) Evonne Goolagong Cawley (semifinals)
4. (United States) Tracy Austin (semifinals)
5. (United Kingdom) Virginia Wade (quarterfinals)
6. (Australia) Dianne Fromholtz (quarterfinals)
7. (United States) Billie Jean King (quarterfinals)
8. (Australia) Wendy Turnbull (quarterfinals)
9. (Australia) Kerry Reid (fourth round)
10. (Romania) Virginia Ruzici (fourth round)
11. (South Africa) Greer Stevens (fourth round)
12. (United Kingdom) Sue Barker (first round)
13. (Czechoslovakia) Regina Maršíková (third round)
14. (United States) Kathy Jordan (fourth round)
15. (Netherlands) Betty Stöve (fourth round)
16. (United States) Pam Shriver (second round)

Click on the seed number of a player to go to their draw section.

Both Evonne Goolagong Cawley and Billie Jean King were given protected seedings above their actual rankings, as they were returning from almost year-long injury absences.

== Draw ==
Key

- Q = Qualifier
- WC = Wild card
- LL = Lucky loser
- Alt = Alternate
- ITF = ITF entry
- PR = Protected ranking
- SR = Special ranking
- SE = Special exempt
- JE = Junior exempt
- JR = Junior Accelerator Programme entrant
- CO = College Accelerator Programme entrant
- NG = Next Gen Accelerator Program entrant
- w/o = Walkover
- r = Retired
- d = Defaulted

=== Finals ===
Quarterfinals
1	(United States) Martina Navratilova	2	6	6
6	(Australia) Dianne Fromholtz	6	3	0
4	(United States) Tracy Austin	6	6	6
7	(United States) Billie Jean King	4	7	2
5	(United Kingdom) Virginia Wade	4	0
3	(Australia) Evonne Goolagong Cawley	6	6
8	(Australia) Wendy Turnbull	3	4
2	(United States) Chris Evert Lloyd	6	6

Semifinals
1	(United States) Martina Navratilova	7	6
4	(United States) Tracy Austin	5	1
3	(Australia) Evonne Goolagong Cawley	3	2
2	(United States) Chris Evert Lloyd	6	6

Final
1	(United States) Martina Navratilova	6	6
2	(United States) Chris Evert Lloyd	4	4

=== Top half ===
==== Section 1 ====
First round
1	(United States) M Navratilova	4	6	6
Q	(South Africa) T Harford	6	2	1
(United States) R Casals	7	7
(West Germany) H Eisterlehner	6	6
(United States) R Gerulaitis	6	6
WC	(United Kingdom) A Cooper	3	4
(South Africa) M Kruger	7	4	5
WC	(United Kingdom) G Coles	5	6	7

Second round
1	(United States) M Navratilova	6	6
WC	(United Kingdom) J Durie	4	1
(United States) R Casals	7	6
(France) F Dürr	5	2
(Argentina) V González	6	3	1
(United States) R Gerulaitis	3	6	6
WC	(United Kingdom) G Coles	0	3
11	(South Africa) G Stevens	6	6

Third round
1	(United States) M Navratilova	6	6
(United States) R Casals	3	3
(United States) R Gerulaitis	3	2
11	(South Africa) G Stevens	6	6

Fourth round
1	(United States) M Navratilova	7	6	6
11	(South Africa) G Stevens	6	7	3

==== Section 2 ====
First round
15	(Netherlands) B Stöve	6	6
(United States) J DuVall	1	4
(United States) K McDaniel	7	4	6
(West Germany) K Ebbinghaus	5	6	1
(United States) K Latham	6	5	4
(Italy) D Porzio	3	7	6
(United States) B Hallquist	3	2
6	(Australia) D Fromholtz	6	6

Second round
15	(Netherlands) B Stöve	6	6
(Australia) C O'Neil	3	1
(United States) K McDaniel	7	6
(Hungary) M Pinterová	6	2
(Italy) D Porzio	6	5
Q	(Netherlands) M Mesker	7	7
Q	(Canada) M Blackwood	2	3
6	(Australia) D Fromholtz	6	6

Third round
15	(Netherlands) B Stöve	2	6	6
(United States) K McDaniel	6	3	2
Q	(Netherlands) M Mesker	5	4
6	(Australia) D Fromholtz	7	6

Fourth round
15	(Netherlands) B Stöve	6	6
6	(Australia) D Fromholtz	7	7

==== Section 3 ====
First round
(South Africa) B Cuypers	6	6
(Netherlands) E Vessies-Appel	4	1
(United States) BA Stuart	4	6	6
(Australia) D Evers	6	4	1
(Sweden) M Wikstedt	6	7
(United States) S Walsh	2	6
(Czechoslovakia) I Budařová	2	2
(United States) S Collins	6	6

Second round
4	(United States) T Austin	4	6	6
(South Africa) B Cuypers	6	1	2
(South Africa) I Kloss	5	6	4
(United States) BA Stuart	7	3	6
(United States) A Smith	4	6
(Sweden) M Wikstedt	6	7
(United States) S Collins	3	4
10	(Romania) V Ruzici	6	6

Third round
4	(United States) T Austin	6	6
(United States) BA Stuart	2	3
(Sweden) M Wikstedt	3	0
10	(Romania) V Ruzici	6	6

Fourth round
4	(United States) T Austin	6	6
10	(Romania) V Ruzici	2	4

==== Section 4 ====
First round
(United Kingdom) A Hobbs	6	7
Q	(United Kingdom) L Charles	2	5
Q	(United States) D Morrison	3	4
(Czechoslovakia) H Mandlíková	6	6
(Socialist Federal Republic of Yugoslavia) M Jaušovec	6	6
Q	(Italy) S Simmonds	2	2
(South Africa) Y Vermaak	4	1
7	(United States) BJ King	6	6

Second round
13	(Czechoslovakia) R Maršíková	6	5	9
(United Kingdom) A Hobbs	3	7	7
(Czechoslovakia) H Mandlíková	7	6
(United States) A-M Fernandez	5	1
(Socialist Federal Republic of Yugoslavia) M Jaušovec	5	4
(United States) D Desfor	7	6
(United States) L Siegel	1	3
7	(United States) BJ King	6	6

Third round
13	(Czechoslovakia) R Maršíková	3	2
(Czechoslovakia) H Mandlíková	6	6
(United States) D Desfor	3	2
7	(United States) BJ King	6	6

Fourth round
(Czechoslovakia) H Mandlíková	4	3
7	(United States) BJ King	6	6

=== Bottom half ===
==== Section 5 ====
First round
5	(United Kingdom) V Wade	6	6
(United States) M Louie	0	4
(West Germany) S Hanika	6	6
(United States) B Potter	4	3
(West Germany) I Riedel	2	6	6
(France) F Thibault	6	1	3
(Argentina) I Madruga	6	4	8
12	(United Kingdom) S Barker	3	6	6

Second round
5	(United Kingdom) V Wade	6	6
(United States) B Jordan	0	1
(United States) L Antonoplis	5	6
(West Germany) S Hanika	7	7
(West Germany) I Riedel	1	6	1
WC	(United Kingdom) D Jevans	6	3	6
(Australia) A Tobin	4	7	7
(Argentina) I Madruga	6	6	5

Third round
5	(United Kingdom) V Wade	6	7
(West Germany) S Hanika	3	6
WC	(United Kingdom) D Jevans	3	7	6
(Australia) A Tobin	6	5	2

Fourth round
5	(United Kingdom) V Wade	6	6
WC	(United Kingdom) D Jevans	1	2

==== Section 6 ====
First round
Q	(Netherlands) M Pakker	6	6	6
(West Germany) B Bunge	3	7	8
(United States) P Teeguarden	7	6
(Czechoslovakia) R Tomanová	6	4
(Argentina) E Raponi	2	4
(Australia) C Doerner	6	6
(United States) M Louie	0	3
3	(Australia) E Goolagong Cawley	6	6

Second round
14	(United States) K Jordan	6	6
(West Germany) B Bunge	1	4
(Czechoslovakia) H Strachoňová	2	6	7
(United States) P Teeguarden	6	4	5
(Australia) C Doerner	5	6	6
WC	(United Kingdom) B Thompson	7	3	0
(United States) S Acker	3	1
3	(Australia) E Goolagong Cawley	6	6

Third round
14	(United States) K Jordan	6	6
(Czechoslovakia) H Strachoňová	2	2
(Australia) C Doerner	5	2
3	(Australia) E Goolagong Cawley	7	6

Fourth round
14	(United States) K Jordan	6	7	1
3	(Australia) E Goolagong Cawley	7	6	6

==== Section 7 ====
First round
(United States) L Forood	4	7	7
(United States) D Gilbert	6	5	5
(United States) A Kiyomura	2	6	4
WC	(United States) M Carillo	6	3	6
(France) G Lovera	4	2
(United States) R Fox	6	6
(United States) R Blount	1	0
9	(Australia) K Reid	6	6

Second round
8	(Australia) W Turnbull	6	6
(United States) L Forood	3	3
(United States) E Nagelsen	0	2
(United States) M Carillo	6	6
(Romania) M Simionescu	4	1
(United States) R Fox	6	6
(United States) C Meyer	1	2
9	(Australia) K Reid	6	6

Third round
8	(Australia) W Turnbull	6	6
(United States) M Carillo	1	3
(United States) R Fox	3	1
9	(Australia) K Reid	6	6

Fourth round
8	(Australia) W Turnbull	6	4	6
9	(Australia) K Reid	3	6	3

==== Section 8 ====
First round
16	(United States) P Shriver	6	6
(Brazil) P Medrado	4	3
(United States) S Margolin	7	6
(United States) J Russell	5	2
(United Kingdom) M Tyler	4	3
(United States) A Moulton	6	6
(United States) M Redondo	4	2
2	(United States) C Evert Lloyd	6	6

Second round
16	(United States) P Shriver	w/o
(United States) L duPont
(United States) S Margolin	1	6	7
(United States) W White	6	3	9
(United States) K Teacher	6	7
(United States) A Moulton	1	5
Q	(United States) A Whitmore	1	2
2	(United States) C Evert Lloyd	6	6

Third round
(United States) L duPont	7	6
(United States) W White	5	3
(United States) K Teacher	4	3
2	(United States) C Evert Lloyd	6	6

Fourth round
(United States) L duPont	2	1
2	(United States) C Evert Lloyd	6	6

== See also ==
- Evert–Navratilova rivalry

Preceded by 1979 French Open – Women's singles	Grand Slam women's singles	Succeeded by 1979 US Open – Women's singles
