= Jan Wilton =

Australian tennis player

- Country (sports): Australia
- Born: 30 April 1957 (age 68)

Singles

Grand Slam singles results
- Australian Open: QF (1977 ^{(Jan)})
- French Open: Q3 (1977)
- Wimbledon: Q3 (1976)

Doubles

Grand Slam doubles results
- Australian Open: QF (1977 ^{(Jan)}, 1977 ^{(Dec)})
- Wimbledon: 1R (1976)

Jan Wilton (born 30 April 1957) is an Australian former professional tennis player.

A native of Sydney, Wilton won a girls' doubles title at the 1976 Australian Open.

Wilton won through to the women's singles last eight of the 1977 Australian Open and took a set off the top-seeded Dianne Fromholtz in her quarter-final loss.
