= 1977 Australian Open (January) – Men's doubles =

Men's doubles
- 1977 Australian Open (January)

Final
- Champions: (United States) Arthur Ashe (Australia) Tony Roche
- Runners-up: (United States) Charlie Pasarell (United States) Erik van Dillen
- Score: 6–4, 6–4

Details
- Draw: 32
- Seeds: 8

Events
Singles	men	women
Doubles	men	women
- Australian Open (January)

Arthur Ashe and Tony Roche defeated Charlie Pasarell and Erik van Dillen in the final, 6–4, 6–4. John Newcombe and Tony Roche were the defending champions.

== Seeds ==
1. (South Africa) Bob Hewitt / (United States) Sherwood Stewart (semifinals)
2. (United States) Marty Riessen / (United States) Roscoe Tanner (quarterfinals)
3. (Australia) Ross Case / (Australia) Geoff Masters (quarterfinals)
4. (United States) Charlie Pasarell / (United States) Erik van Dillen (final)
5. (Australia) Ray Ruffels / (Australia) Allan Stone (first round)
6. (United States) Arthur Ashe / (Australia) Tony Roche (champion)
7. (Australia) Bob Carmichael / (Australia) Ken Rosewall (first round)
8. (Australia) Paul Kronk / (Australia) Cliff Letcher (first round)

== Draw ==
Key

- Q = Qualifier
- WC = Wild card
- LL = Lucky loser
- Alt = Alternate
- ITF = ITF entry
- PR = Protected ranking
- SR = Special ranking
- SE = Special exempt
- JE = Junior exempt
- JR = Junior Accelerator Programme entrant
- CO = College Accelerator Programme entrant
- NG = Next Gen Accelerator Program entrant
- w/o = Walkover
- r = Retired
- d = Defaulted

=== Finals ===
Semifinals
1	(South Africa) Bob Hewitt (United States) Sherwood Stewart	4	6	7
6	(United States) Arthur Ashe (Australia) Tony Roche	6	4	9
4	(United States) Charlie Pasarell (United States) Erik van Dillen	6	7	6
(Australia) John Alexander (Australia) Phil Dent	7	6	2

Final
6	(United States) Arthur Ashe (Australia) Tony Roche	6	6
4	(United States) Charlie Pasarell (United States) Erik van Dillen	4	4

=== Top half ===
First round
1	(South Africa) B Hewitt (United States) S Stewart	6	6
(Australia) D Carter (Australia) W Maher	3	4
(New Zealand) C Lewis (New Zealand) R Simpson	6	7
(Australia) M Edmondson (Australia) J Marks	2	5
7	(Australia) B Carmichael (Australia) K Rosewall	5	2
(United States) T Gorman (United States) D Stockton	7	6
(Australia) S Ball (Australia) K Warwick	6	6
(United States) V Amaya (Australia) S Docherty	3	2
3	(Australia) R Case (Australia) G Masters	4	7	6
(United States) J Holladay (United States) B Teacher	6	5	3
(Australia) B Giltinan (Australia) J Trickey	6	2
(Romania) I Țiriac (Argentina) G Vilas	7	6
6	(United States) A Ashe (Australia) T Roche	6	6
(Australia) J Bartlett (Australia) A Gardiner	2	1
(United Kingdom) J Feaver (Australia) J James	6	6
(United States) P Fleming (United States) S Mott	4	3

Second round
1	(South Africa) B Hewitt (United States) S Stewart	4	6	9
(New Zealand) C Lewis (New Zealand) R Simpson	6	2	7
(United States) T Gorman (United States) D Stockton	3	7	3
(Australia) S Ball (Australia) K Warwick	6	6	6
3	(Australia) R Case (Australia) G Masters	7	6
(Romania) I Țiriac (Argentina) G Vilas	5	2
6	(United States) A Ashe (Australia) T Roche	6	6
(United Kingdom) J Feaver (Australia) J James	4	4

Quarterfinals
1	(South Africa) B Hewitt (United States) S Stewart	4	6	6
(Australia) S Ball (Australia) K Warwick	6	1	2
3	(Australia) R Case (Australia) G Masters	6	7	3
6	(United States) A Ashe (Australia) T Roche	7	5	6

Semifinals
1	(South Africa) B Hewitt (United States) S Stewart	4	6	7
6	(United States) A Ashe (Australia) T Roche	6	4	9

=== Bottom half ===
First round
(United Kingdom) R Drysdale (United Kingdom) R Lewis	3	7	6
(Australia) D Crealy (Australia) W Lloyd	6	6	4
(Australia) C Dibley (Australia) C Kachel	7	6
5	(Australia) R Ruffels (Australia) A Stone	6	4
(Australia) S Myers (United Kingdom) J Smith	3	7	6
(Australia) E Ewert (United States) C Hagey	6	5	0
(Australia) P McNamara (Australia) P McNamee	4	3
4	(United States) C Pasarell (United States) E van Dillen	6	6
(Australia) B Phillips-Moore (United States) R Reid	6	1	5
(United States) D Bohrnstedt (United States) M Machette	3	6	7
(Australia) J Alexander (Australia) P Dent	6	6
8	(Australia) P Kronk (Australia) C Letcher	3	4
(Australia) R Frawley (Australia) G Thomson	4	4
(United States) H Pfister (United States) N Saviano	6	6
(Iran) M Bahrami (Greece) N Kelaidis	1	2
2	(United States) M Riessen (United States) R Tanner	6	6

Second round
(United Kingdom) R Drysdale (United Kingdom) R Lewis	3	5
(Australia) C Dibley (Australia) C Kachel	6	7
(Australia) S Myers (United Kingdom) J Smith	1	2
4	(United States) C Pasarell (United States) E van Dillen	6	6
(United States) D Bohrnstedt (United States) M Machette	3	4
(Australia) J Alexander (Australia) P Dent	6	6
(United States) H Pfister (United States) N Saviano	5	3
2	(United States) M Riessen (United States) R Tanner	7	6

Quarterfinals
(Australia) C Dibley (Australia) C Kachel	6	1	7
4	(United States) C Pasarell (United States) E van Dillen	3	6	9
(Australia) J Alexander (Australia) P Dent	7	7
2	(United States) M Riessen (United States) R Tanner	6	5

Semifinals
4	(United States) C Pasarell (United States) E van Dillen	6	7	6
(Australia) J Alexander (Australia) P Dent	7	6	2
