= 1977 Australian Open (January) – Women's doubles =

Women's doubles
- 1977 Australian Open (January)

Final
- Champions: (Australia) Dianne Fromholtz (Australia) Helen Gourlay
- Runners-up: (United States) Betsy Nagelsen (Australia) Kerry Reid
- Score: 5–7, 6–1, 7–5

Details
- Draw: 16
- Seeds: 4

Events
Singles	men	women
Doubles	men	women
- Australian Open (January)

Evonne Cawley and Helen Gourlay were the defending champions. Cawley did not compete. Gourlay, first-seeded, won the title together with fellow Australian Dianne Fromholtz in the final after defeating second-seeded Betsy Nagelsen and Kerry Reid.

== Seeds ==
1. (Australia) Dianne Fromholtz / (Australia) Helen Gourlay (champions)
2. (United States) Betsy Nagelsen / (Australia) Kerry Reid (final)
3. (West Germany) Katja Ebbinghaus / (West Germany) Heidi Eisterlehner (first round)
4. (Australia) Lesley Bowrey / (Australia) Jan O'Neill (semifinals)

== Draw ==
Key

- Q = Qualifier
- WC = Wild card
- LL = Lucky loser
- Alt = Alternate
- ITF = ITF entry
- PR = Protected ranking
- SR = Special ranking
- SE = Special exempt
- JE = Junior exempt
- JR = Junior Accelerator Programme entrant
- CO = College Accelerator Programme entrant
- NG = Next Gen Accelerator Program entrant
- w/o = Walkover
- r = Retired
- d = Defaulted

First round
1	(Australia) D Fromholtz (Australia) H Gourlay	7	6	6
(Belgium) M Gurdal (Japan) N Sato	5	7	4
(Italy) D Marzano (Australia) C O'Neil	6	5	6
(New Zealand) J Connor (Czechoslovakia) R Maršíková	0	7	2
(Australia) W Paish (Australia) M Sawyer	6	6
(Australia) K Neill (Australia) M Robinson	4	1
(Australia) J Dalton (Australia) K Krantzcke	4	6	4
4	(Australia) L Bowrey (Australia) J O'Neill	6	3	6
3	(West Germany) K Ebbinghaus (West Germany) H Eisterlehner	2	6
(Australia) N Gregory (Australia) J Wilton	6	7
(United States) V Franta (United States) D Stockton	2	6
(Australia) K Ruddell (Australia) J Young	6	7
(Australia) K Hallam (Australia) C Zeeman	6	1
(Australia) C Matison (Australia) P Whytcross	7	6
(United States) R Fox (United States) K Harter	2	6
2	(United States) B Nagelsen (Australia) K Reid	6	7

Quarterfinals
1	(Australia) D Fromholtz (Australia) H Gourlay	6	6
(Italy) D Marzano (Australia) C O'Neil	4	1
(Australia) W Paish (Australia) M Sawyer	5	5
4	(Australia) L Bowrey (Australia) J O'Neill	7	7
(Australia) N Gregory (Australia) J Wilton	6	4
(Australia) K Ruddell (Australia) J Young	7	6
(Australia) C Matison (Australia) P Whytcross	5	4
2	(United States) B Nagelsen (Australia) K Reid	7	6

Semifinals
1	(Australia) D Fromholtz (Australia) H Gourlay	6	6
4	(Australia) L Bowrey (Australia) J O'Neill	4	3
(Australia) K Ruddell (Australia) J Young	3	4
2	(United States) B Nagelsen (Australia) K Reid	6	6

Final
1	(Australia) D Fromholtz (Australia) H Gourlay	5	6	7
2	(United States) B Nagelsen (Australia) K Reid	7	1	5
