= Bill Lloyd (tennis) =

Australian tennis player

- Full name: William Lloyd
- Country (sports): Australia
- Born: 7 May 1949 (age 76) Sydney, Australia

Singles
- Career record: 23–53
- Highest ranking: No. 106 (31 December 1977)

Grand Slam singles results
- Australian Open: 2R (1968, 1977 ^{Jan}, 1977 ^{Dec})
- French Open: 1R (1973, 1976, 1978)
- Wimbledon: 1R (1972, 1976)
- US Open: 2R (1975)

Doubles
- Career record: 24–36

Grand Slam doubles results
- Australian Open: 1R (1977 ^{Jan}, 1977 ^{Dec})
- French Open: 2R (1973, 1976)
- Wimbledon: 2R (1972)
- US Open: QF (1975)

William Lloyd (born 7 May 1949) is a former professional tennis player from Australia.

== Biography ==
=== Early life and education ===
Lloyd was born in Sydney in 1949. Between ages 8 and 18 he won four Australian National Championships and six state titles. He was selected for the Australian Junior Davis Cup squad in 1966 and 1967. He briefly attended the University of California, Berkeley in 1968. In 1969 he enrolled at Southern Illinois University, where he played collegiate tennis.

Lloyd won the junior doubles title at the 1968 Australian Championships, partnering with Phil Dent.

== Professional career ==
During his 14 year career, which spanned from 1965 through 1979, he competed in the main draw of all four Grand Slam tournaments. He lost a marathon match at the 1972 Wimbledon Championships to Wanaro N'Godrella, 9–11 in the fifth set. At the 1975 US Open he and Phil Dent defeated Björn Borg and Rod Laver en route to the quarter-finals. His best Grand Slam result was a semi-final in mixed doubles at the 1978 French Open, with Trish Bostrom.

== Later career ==
He is a New South Wales–based barrister.
