= Annemarie Rüegg =

Swiss tennis player

- Country (sports): Switzerland
- Born: 1 April 1958 (age 67)

Singles
- Career record: 3–2 (Federation Cup)

Grand Slam singles results
- French Open: Q1 (1978)
- Wimbledon: Q2 (1976)

Doubles
- Career record: 5–1 (Federation Cup)

Annemarie Rüegg (born 1 April 1958) is a Swiss former professional tennis player.

Rüegg competed in the Federation Cup for Switzerland from 1976 to 1978, then again in 1986. She helped Switzerland win a tie against Italy in 1977, with victories in her singles and doubles rubber.

In both 2002 and 2005 she had stints as Switzerland's Fed Cup captain.

== See also ==
- List of Switzerland Fed Cup team representatives
