= Cathy Drury =

British tennis player

- Full name: Cathy Birt (nee Drury)
- Country (sports): United Kingdom
- Born: 25 March 1960 (age 64)
- Plays: Right-handed

Singles

Grand Slam singles results
- Australian Open: 1R (1977 (Dec))
- Wimbledon: 1R (1983)

Doubles

Grand Slam doubles results
- Australian Open: 1R (1977 (Dec)))
- Wimbledon: 2R (1979, 1980)

Cathy Drury (born 25 March 1960) is a British former professional tennis player.

A right-handed player, Drury made her grand slam singles main draw debut at the 1977 Australian Open, where she was beaten in the opening round by second seeded countrywoman Sue Barker.

Drury competed as a singles wildcard in the 1983 Wimbledon Championships. As a doubles player she twice featured in the Wimbledon second round.

Since the 1990s she has run the Set Point Tennis Academy in Thames Ditton, along with husband Gordon Birt, a tennis player turned coach from South Africa.
