= Katja Ebbinghaus =

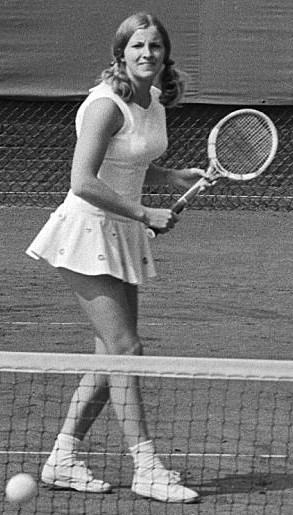
- Country (sports): West Germany
- Born: 6 January 1948 (age 78) Karlsruhe, Germany
- Plays: Right-handed

Singles
- Career record: 34–34

Grand Slam singles results
- Australian Open: QF (1977)
- French Open: QF (1972, 1973, 1974)
- Wimbledon: 3R (1977)
- US Open: QF (1975)

Doubles
- Career record: 27–28
- Career titles: 3

Grand Slam doubles results
- Australian Open: 1R (1977-Jan)
- French Open: F (1974)
- Wimbledon: 4R (1973)
- US Open: 3R (1974)

Katja Ebbinghaus (née Burgemeister, born 6 January 1948) is a former professional tennis player from Germany, active from 1969 to 1982. She reached five Grand Slam quarterfinals in singles, and a Grand Slam final in doubles, and played for West Germany in the Federation Cup in all but two years between 1970 and 1979.

== Career ==
Ebbinghaus reached the final of the women's doubles at the 1974 French Open, partnering Gail Chanfreau. In the final, Chris Evert and Olga Morozova defeated them in three sets. In singles tournaments, she reached the quarterfinals of the French Open in 1972, 1973, and 1974; the quarterfinals of 1975 US Open, losing in straight sets to Virginia Wade; and the quarter-finals of January 1977 Australian Open, losing to Kerry Reid, also in straight sets.

Ebbinghaus played for West Germany in the Federation Cup in 1970 and from 1972 to 1975 and from 1977 to 1979, playing in the semifinals of the World Group in 1973 and 1974.

In 1977, when Evonne Goolagong made a return to tennis after the birth of her daughter, Ebbinghaus beat her in the first round of the Canadian Open.

== Personal life ==
She married Dieter Ebbinghaus and they were divorced in 1974. In 1977, she moved from Munich, where she had lived for nine years, to Hamburg.

== WTA Tour finals ==
=== Doubles: 3 runner-ups ===
Legend
Grand Slam	0
Tier I	0
Tier II	0
Tier III	0
Tier IV & V	0

Titles by surface
Hard	0
Clay	0
Grass	0
Carpet	0

Result	W/L	Date	Tournament	Surface	Partner	Opponents	Score
Loss	0–1	Jun 1974	French Open	Clay	(France) Gail Chanfreau	(United States) Chris Evert (Soviet Union) Olga Morozova	4–6, 6–2, 1–6
Loss	0–2	May 1978	German Open	Clay	(West Germany) Helga Masthoff	(Socialist Federal Republic of Yugoslavia) Mima Jaušovec (Romania) Virginia Ruzici	4–6, 7–5, 0–6
Loss	0–3	Nov 1978	Christchurch, New Zealand	Grass	(West Germany) Sylvia Hanika	(Australia) Lesley Hunt (United States) Sharon Walsh	1–6, 5–7
