= Pamela Baily =

Australian tennis player

- Country (sports): Australia
- Born: 29 October 1958 (age 68)

Grand Slam singles results
- Australian Open: 1R (1977)

Pamela Baily (born 29 October 1958) is an Australian tennis player.

== Career ==
Baily won the junior girl's title at the 1977 Australian Open in January (Amanda Tobin won the competition in December of that year).
