= 1977 Australian Open (December) – Men's singles =

Men's singles
- 1977 Australian Open (December)

Final
- Champion: (United States) Vitas Gerulaitis
- Runner-up: (United Kingdom) John Lloyd
- Score: 6–3, 7–6^{(7–4)}, 5–7, 3–6, 6–2

Details
- Draw: 64
- Seeds: 8

Events
Singles	men	women
Doubles	men	women
- Australian Open (December)

Vitas Gerulaitis defeated in a long hard fought battle John Lloyd in the final, 6–3, 7–6^{(7–4)}, 5–7, 3–6, 6–2 in 69 hours, rain delay, to win the men's singles tennis title at the December 1977 Australian Open. It was his first and only major singles title. Gerulaitis was making his tournament debut.

Roscoe Tanner was the defending champion, but lost in the first round to Chris Lewis.

The second of the two Australian Opens held in 1977 started on 19 December and ended on 31 December. For the first Australian Open held in 1977, see: 1977 Australian Open (January).

== Seeds ==
The seeded players are listed below. Vitas Gerulaitis is the champion; others show the round in which they were eliminated.

1. (United States) Vitas Gerulaitis (champion)
2. (United States) Roscoe Tanner (first round)
3. (Australia) Tony Roche (first round)
4. (Australia) Ken Rosewall (quarterfinals)
5. (Australia) Phil Dent (second round)
6. (Australia) John Alexander (semifinals)
7. (United States) Stan Smith (third round)
8. (United States) Tim Gullikson (third round)

== Draw ==
=== Key ===
- Q = Qualifier
- WC = Wild card
- LL = Lucky loser
- r = Retired

=== Final eight ===
Quarterfinals
1	(United States) Vitas Gerulaitis	6	6	6	6
(Australia) Ray Ruffels	7	4	4	2
4	(Australia) Ken Rosewall	6	6	6	1
6	(Australia) John Alexander	7	7	4	6
(Australia) John Newcombe	6	3	5	5
(United Kingdom) John Lloyd	3	6	7	7
(United Kingdom) Robin Drysdale	4	4	6	6
Q	(Australia) Bob Giltinan	6	6	3	7

Semifinals
1	(United States) Vitas Gerulaitis	6	6	6
6	(Australia) John Alexander	1	2	4
(United Kingdom) John Lloyd	6	6	6
Q	(Australia) Bob Giltinan	4	2	0

Final
1	(United States) Vitas Gerulaitis	6	7	5	3	6
(United Kingdom) John Lloyd	3	6	7	6	2

=== Section 1 ===
First round
1	(United States) V Gerulaitis	7	6	6
(Australia) J Marks	6	0	1
Q	(Australia) R Frawley	6	2	7	6	2
Q	(Australia) B Drewett	7	6	6	2	6
(New Zealand) O Parun	2	4	7	4
(United States) DR Bohrnstedt	6	6	6	6
(Australia) J James	6	6	1	6
(Australia) J Bartlett	0	3	6	2
(Australia) K Warwick	5	7	6	5
(Australia) P McNamee	7	6	7	7
(Australia) R Ruffels	6	7	3	6
(Australia) W Maher	4	6	6	1
(Australia) B Carmichael	2	6	3	3
Q	(Australia) N Phillips	6	4	6	6
(Australia) P McNamara	6	3	6	6	3
8	(United States) T Gullikson	3	6	2	7	6

Second round
1	(United States) V Gerulaitis	6	6	6
Q	(Australia) B Drewett	4	3	3
(United States) DR Bohrnstedt	6	6	6	6
(Australia) J James	2	4	7	4
(Australia) P McNamee	3	2	3
(Australia) R Ruffels	6	6	6
Q	(Australia) N Phillips	2	2	1
8	(United States) T Gullikson	6	6	6

Third round
1	(United States) V Gerulaitis	6	6	6
(United States) DR Bohrnstedt	4	4	4
(Australia) R Ruffels	6	3	6	6
8	(United States) T Gullikson	3	6	4	3

Quarterfinals
1	(United States) V Gerulaitis	6	6	6	6
(Australia) R Ruffels	7	4	4	2

=== Section 2 ===
First round
4	(Australia) K Rosewall	6	7	6
(Australia) D Collings	4	6	3
(Australia) B Lloyd	7	6	6
(United States) W Lofgren	5	2	2
(Australia) B Phillips-Moore	6	7	7
(France) C Casa	0	6	5
(Australia) A Stone	3	6	6	6
(United States) S Carnahan	6	2	4	1
(United States) B Scanlon	6	6	6
(New Zealand) B Fairlie	3	2	3
(Sweden) D Palm	5	r.
(Australia) A Gardiner	7
Q	(Australia) M Anderson	6	5	r.
(Australia) C Kachel	7	7
(United States) W Blocher	2	2	5
6	(Australia) J Alexander	6	6	7

Second round
4	(Australia) K Rosewall	6	6	6
(Australia) B Lloyd	3	2	3
(Australia) B Phillips-Moore	1	1	1
(Australia) A Stone	6	6	6
(United States) B Scanlon	6	2	6	6
(Australia) A Gardiner	2	6	3	4
(Australia) C Kachel	3	4	7	2
6	(Australia) J Alexander	6	6	5	6

Third round
4	(Australia) K Rosewall	6	4	6	4	9
(Australia) A Stone	4	6	4	6	7
(United States) B Scanlon	6	7	1	2
6	(Australia) J Alexander	7	6	6	6

Quarterfinals
4	(Australia) K Rosewall	6	6	6	1
6	(Australia) J Alexander	7	7	4	6

=== Section 3 ===
First round
7	(United States) S Smith	7	6	6
(United Kingdom) J Feaver	5	3	4
(Australia) D Crealy	6	7	5	6
Q	(Australia) P Campbell	2	6	7	3
(Australia) J Newcombe	6	7	6
(United States) B Teacher	3	6	3
(United States) E Teltscher	3	2	2
(Australia) C Dibley	6	6	6
(United Kingdom) J Lloyd	4	6	4	6	6
(Australia) S Ball	6	3	6	4	4
(Australia) T Rocavert	5	4	2
(Venezuela) J Andrew	7	6	6
(United States) T Wilkison	2	6	1
(Australia) C Letcher	6	7	6
(United Kingdom) R Lewis	4	4	6	6	6
3	(Australia) T Roche	6	6	3	3	3

Second round
7	(United States) S Smith	4	6	7	6
(Australia) D Crealy	6	3	6	3
(Australia) J Newcombe	6	7	6
(Australia) C Dibley	4	6	3
(United Kingdom) J Lloyd	0	6	7	6
(Venezuela) J Andrew	6	3	6	2
(Australia) C Letcher	7	6	3	6
(United Kingdom) R Lewis	6	2	6	2

Third round
7	(United States) S Smith	3	6	5
(Australia) J Newcombe	6	7	7
(United Kingdom) J Lloyd	6	6	6
(Australia) C Letcher	2	4	2

Quarterfinals
(Australia) J Newcombe	6	3	5	5
(United Kingdom) J Lloyd	3	6	7	7

=== Section 4 ===
First round
5	(Australia) P Dent	4	6	5	6	6
(United States) M Machette	6	2	7	1	2
(Australia) S Docherty	3	4	4
(United Kingdom) R Drysdale	6	6	6
(United States) E Friedler	6	7	6	6	4
Q	(Austria) P Feigl	7	6	7	3	6
(United States) T Gorman	7	2	1	3
(West Germany) K Meiler	6	6	6	6
LL	(France) G Moretton	7	6	3	4	5
(Sweden) J Norbäck	6	1	6	6	7
Q	(Australia) B Giltinan	6	6	6
(United States) G Hardie	3	2	4
(Australia) G Masters	6	6	6
LL	(United States) C Sylvan	4	4	3
(New Zealand) C Lewis	3	6	6	1	6
2	(United States) R Tanner	6	3	2	6	4

Second round
5	(Australia) P Dent	6	1	4
(United Kingdom) R Drysdale	7	6	6
Q	(Austria) P Feigl	6	7	2	1	r.
(West Germany) K Meiler	7	6	6	2
(Sweden) J Norbäck	6	3	4
Q	(Australia) B Giltinan	7	6	6
(Australia) G Masters	0	3	3
(New Zealand) C Lewis	6	6	6

Third round
(United Kingdom) R Drysdale	6	7	7
(West Germany) K Meiler	3	6	6
Q	(Australia) B Giltinan	6	6	7
(New Zealand) C Lewis	3	3	6

Quarterfinals
(United Kingdom) R Drysdale	4	4	6	6
Q	(Australia) B Giltinan	6	6	3	7

Preceded by 1977 US Open	Grand Slam men's singles	Succeeded by 1978 French Open
