= 1977 Toyota Classic =

- Date: 21–27 November
- Edition: 15th
- Category: Colgate Series (AA)
- Draw: 32S/16D
- Prize money: $75,000
- Surface: Grass
- Location: Melbourne, Australia
- Venue: Kooyong

Champions

Singles
- (Australia) Evonne Goolagong Cawley

Doubles
- (Australia) Evonne Goolagong Cawley (Netherlands) Betty Stöve
← 1976 ·	Victorian Open (tennis)	· 1978 →

The 1977 Toyota Classic, was a women's tennis tournament played on outdoor grass courts at Kooyong in Melbourne in Australia. The event was part of the AA (Note: Tournaments with prize money for the women of at least $750,000.) category of the 1978 Colgate Series. It was the 15th edition of the tournament and was held from 21 November through 27 November 1977. Eighth-seeded Evonne Goolagong Cawley won the singles title and earned $14,000 first-prize money and 160 ranking points.

== Winners ==
=== Singles ===
(Australia) Evonne Goolagong Cawley defeated (Australia) Wendy Turnbull 6–4, 6–1

- It was Goolagong Cawley's 2nd title of the year and the 68th of her career.

=== Doubles ===
(Australia) Evonne Goolagong Cawley / (Netherlands) Betty Stöve defeated (United States) Patricia Bostrom / (Australia) Kym Ruddell 6–3, 6–0

== Prize money ==
Event	W	F	SF	QF	Round of 16	Round of 32
Singles	$14,000	$7,000	$3,500	$1,800	$1,000	$500
