= Debbie Jevans =

British tennis player

Debbie Jevans CBE
- Full name: Deborah Jevans
- Country (sports): Great Britain
- Born: 20 May 1960 (age 66) London, England
- Turned pro: 1976
- Retired: 1983

Singles
- Career record: 17–31

Grand Slam singles results
- French Open: 2R (1981)
- Wimbledon: 4R (1979)
- US Open: 2R (1982)

Doubles
- Career record: 16–42

Grand Slam doubles results
- French Open: 3R (1981)
- Wimbledon: 3R (1979)
- US Open: 3R (1980)

Deborah Jevans CBE (born 20 May 1960) is a British former tennis player and current sports executive.

== Career ==
Jevans is a former junior Wimbledon champion and played in ten Grand Slam singles draws between 1979 and 1983, with her best result being the fourth round of Wimbledon, losing to fifth-seeded Virginia Wade. In 1978 she reached the quarter finals of the mixed doubles event at Wimbledon with her future husband and Wimbledon referee Andrew Jarrett.

In 1987, at the age of 27, Jevans took up a role of director of the Women's Game at the International Tennis Federation and in 1991 became general secretary. In 2003 she was appointed as director of sports for London 2012. After the London Olympic and Paralympic Games, she took over the post of chief executive for the 2015 Rugby World Cup. In 2014 she topped the list of the 50 most influential women in British sport created by The Guardian. Jevans stepped down from her Rugby World Cup role in March 2015 citing personal reasons. She had reportedly fallen out with members of the RFU and received a £150,000 payoff when she left. She is a member of the board of the All England Lawn Tennis and Croquet Club (AELTC).

Jevans is also a non-executive director of the English Football League having been appointed this role in 2014. When Ian Lenagan resigned as chairman of the organisation, Jevans was appointed interim chair in September 2018 until a new chairperson was elected in 2019.

Jevans was appointed Commander of the Order of the British Empire (CBE) in the 2013 New Year Honours "for services to Sport and the London 2012 Olympic and Paralympic Games", in her role as Director of Sport at LOCOG.

In July 2023, Jevans became the first chairwoman of the All England Lawn Tennis and Croquet Club Board who succeeded Ian Hewitt after the conclusion of the 2023 Wimbledon Championships.
