= 1977 Australian Open (January) – Women's singles =

Women's singles
- 1977 Australian Open (January)

Final
- Champion: (Australia) Kerry Reid
- Runner-up: (Australia) Dianne Fromholtz
- Score: 7–5, 6–2

Details
- Draw: 32 (4 Q )
- Seeds: 4

Events
Singles	men	women
Doubles	men	women
← 1976 ·	Australian Open (January)	· 1977 →

Kerry Reid defeated Dianne Fromholtz in the final, 7–5 6–2 to win the women's singles tennis title at the January 1977 Australian Open. It was her first and only major singles title.

Evonne Goolagong was the three-time reigning champion, but did not compete in January 1977.

== Seeds ==
The seeded players are listed below. Kerry Reid is the champion; others show the round in which they were eliminated.

1. (Australia) Dianne Fromholtz (final)
2. (Australia) Kerry Reid (champion)
3. (Australia) Helen Gourlay (semifinals)
4. (United States) Betsy Nagelsen (first round)

== Draw ==
=== Key ===
- Q = Qualifier
- WC = Wild card
- LL = Lucky loser
- Alt = Alternate
- ITF = ITF entry
- PR = Protected ranking
- SR = Special ranking
- SE = Special exempt
- JE = Junior exempt
- JR = Junior Accelerator Programme entrant
- CO = College Accelerator Programme entrant
- NG = Next Gen Accelerator Program entrant
- w/o = Walkover
- r = Retired
- d = Defaulted

=== Finals ===
Quarterfinals
1	(Australia) Dianne Fromholtz	6	4	6
(Australia) Jan Wilton	3	6	1
(Australia) Karen Krantzcke	6	4	6
(Japan) Naoko Sato	3	6	0
Q	(Australia) Mary Sawyer	1	4
3	(Australia) Helen Gourlay	6	6
(West Germany) Katja Ebbinghaus	0	4
2	(Australia) Kerry Reid	6	6

Semifinals
1	(Australia) Dianne Fromholtz	7	6
(Australia) Karen Krantzcke	6	4
3	(Australia) Helen Gourlay	2	6	3
2	(Australia) Kerry Reid	6	1	6

Final
1	(Australia) Dianne Fromholtz	5	2
2	(Australia) Kerry Reid	7	6

=== Top half ===
First round
1	(Australia) D Fromholtz	6	3
(United States) P Bostrom	0	0	r.
(Australia) J O'Neil	6	4	6
(Australia) C Matison	4	6	4
(Belgium) M Gurdal	6	4	1
(Italy) D Marzano	3	6	6
(Australia) J Dalton	3	6	1
(Australia) J Wilton	6	4	6
4	(United States) B Nagelsen	6	5	3
(Australia) N Gregory	2	7	6
(Australia) K Krantzcke	6	6
(New Zealand) J Connor	3	2
(United States) K Harter	7	4	4
(Australia) P Whytcross	5	6	6
(Australia) K Ruddell	4	4
(Japan) N Sato	6	6

Second round
1	(Australia) D Fromholtz	6	6
(Australia) J O'Neil	1	2
(Italy) D Marzano	2	3
(Australia) J Wilton	6	6
(Australia) N Gregory	4	1
(Australia) K Krantzcke	6	6
(Australia) P Whytcross	5	3
(Japan) N Sato	7	6

Quarterfinals
1	(Australia) D Fromholtz	6	4	6
(Australia) J Wilton	3	6	1
(Australia) K Krantzcke	6	4	6
(Japan) N Sato	3	6	0

Semifinals
1	(Australia) D Fromholtz	7	6
(Australia) K Krantzcke	6	4

=== Bottom half ===
First round
Q	(Australia) M Sawyer	6	7
(Australia) J Dimond	3	4
(United States) B Bruning	7	6	6
(Australia) W Paish	6	7	2
Q	(Australia) C Zeeman	1	2
(Czechoslovakia) R Maršíková	6	6
Q	(Australia) P Baily	6	1	1
3	(Australia) H Gourley	3	6	6
(United States) R Fox	6	6
Q	(Australia) A Tobin	2	2
(West Germany) K Ebbinghaus	6	6
(West Germany) H Eisterlehner	1	2
(Australia) C O'Neil	7	4	3
(Australia) J Young	6	6	6
(Australia) L Bowrey	3	2
2	(Australia) K Reid	6	6

Second round
Q	(Australia) M Sawyer	6	4	6
(United States) B Bruning	3	6	3
(Czechoslovakia) R Maršíková	3	3
3	(Australia) H Gourley	6	6
(United States) R Fox	2	7	1
(West Germany) K Ebbinghaus	6	6	6
(Australia) J Young	1	2
2	(Australia) K Reid	6	6

Quarterfinals
Q	(Australia) M Sawyer	1	4
3	(Australia) H Gourley	6	6
(West Germany) K Ebbinghaus	0	4
2	(Australia) K Reid	6	6

Semifinals
3	(Australia) H Gourley	2	6	3
2	(Australia) K Reid	6	1	6

Preceded by 1976 US Open – Women's singles	Grand Slam women's singles	Succeeded by 1977 French Open – Women's singles
