= Daniela Porzio =

Italian tennis player

- Country (sports): Italy
- Born: 6 June 1950
- Died: 2 October 2017 (aged 67); Milan, Italy

Singles
- Highest ranking: No. 53 (July 1979)

Grand Slam singles results
- Australian Open: 2R (1977)
- French Open: 2R (1976)
- Wimbledon: 2R (1979)
- US Open: 2R (1979)

Doubles

Grand Slam doubles results
- Australian Open: QF (1977)
- French Open: SF (1978)
- Wimbledon: 3R (1973)
- US Open: 3R (1977)
Medal record
Mediterranean Games
| Silver medal – second place | 1979 Split | Women's Singles |

Daniela Porzio (6 June 1950 – 2 October 2017), also known by her married name Daniela Marzano, was a professional tennis player from Italy who was active in the 1970s.

During her career she reached the second round in singles at all four Grand Slam tournaments. Her best Grand Slam result in doubles was reaching the semifinals at the 1978 French Open with her American partner Paula Smith, which they lost to eventual champions Mima Jaušovec and Virginia Ruzici.

Porzio was a member of the Italian Fed Cup team from 1971 to 1980 and had a 15–14 win–loss record.

After her playing career, she started coaching and became the first coach of Francesca Schiavone.

She was married to Italian tennis player Pietro Marzano.
