= Mark Meyers (tennis) =

American tennis player

- Country (sports): United States
- Born: December 5, 1953 (age 71)
- Plays: Right-handed

Singles
- Career record: 2–8
- Highest ranking: No. 148 (Dec 12, 1976)

Grand Slam singles results
- Australian Open: 1R (1977)
- US Open: 1R (1976)

Mark Meyers (born December 5, 1953) is an American former professional tennis player.

Meyers grew up in Louisiana, graduating from Franklin High School in New Orleans. He was a collegiate tennis player for Duke University and won the 1973 ACC singles championship. In the late 1970s he competed briefly in professional tennis, with main draw appearances at the Australian Open and US Open. He studied at LSU Law School and worked for many years as an attorney for Shell, while continuing to compete at a high level in senior tennis tournaments.
