= Anthea Stewart (tennis) =

British tennis player

- Country (sports): United Kingdom
- Born: 7 February 1959 (age 66)

Singles

Grand Slam singles results
- French Open: Q1 (1980)
- Wimbledon: 1R (1976, 1979, 1980, 1981)
- US Open: 1R (1980)

Doubles

Grand Slam doubles results
- Wimbledon: 1R (1979, 1981)

Grand Slam mixed doubles results
- Wimbledon: 2R (1981)

Anthea Stewart (born 7 February 1959) is a British former professional tennis player. Her maiden name is Cooper.

Stewart, ranked as high as seventh in the United Kingdom, was active on tour in the 1970 and 1980s. She played in four singles main draws at Wimbledon and also qualified once for the US Open. One of her Wimbledon appearances was a first-round loss to American rising star Andrea Jaeger in 1980.
