= Erik van Dillen =

American tennis player

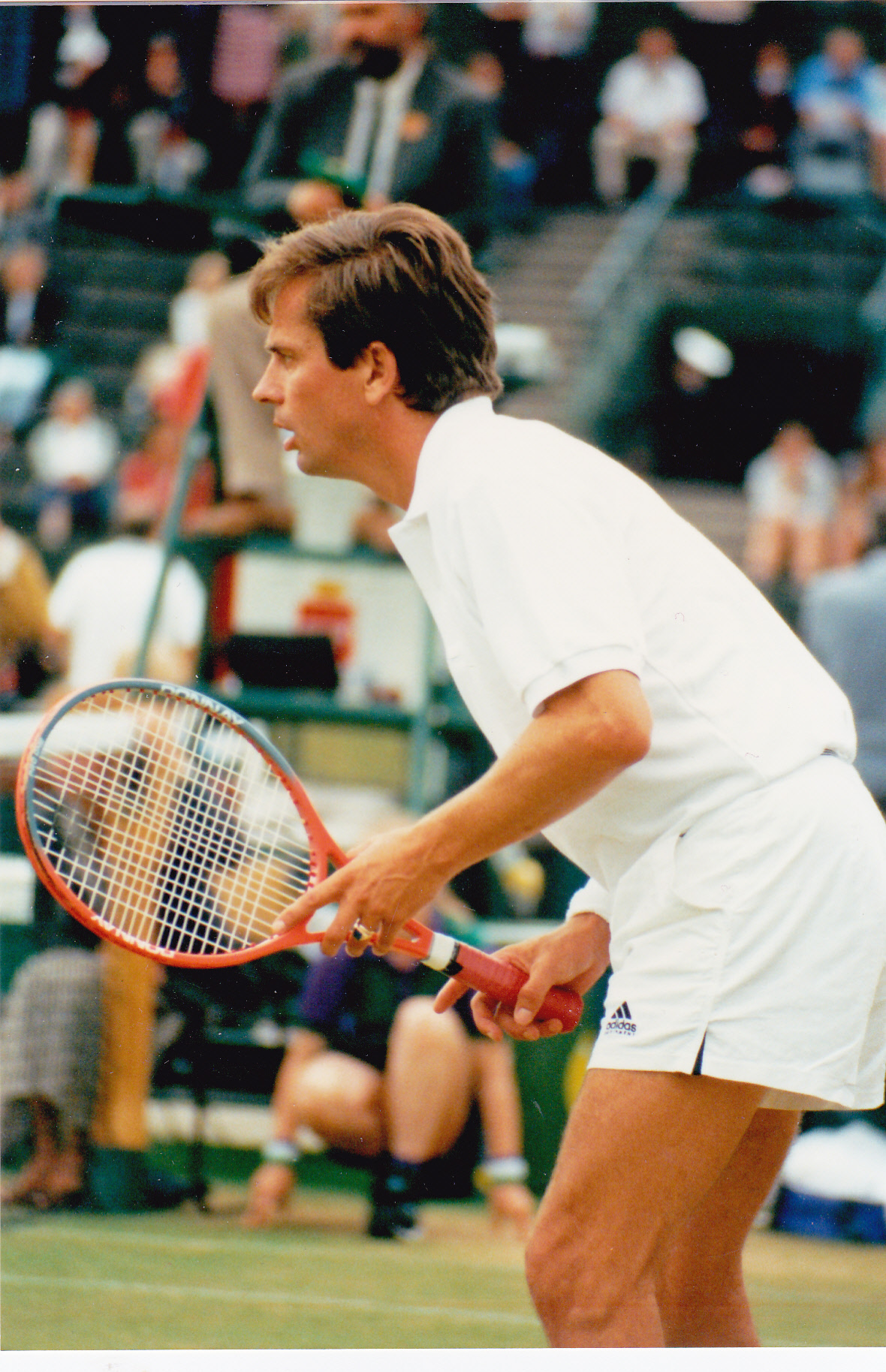
- van Dillen circa 1990
- Country (sports): United States
- Residence: San Mateo, California
- Born: February 21, 1951 (age 75) San Mateo
- Height: 6 ft 0 in (1.83 m)
- Turned pro: 1964 (amateur tour)
- Retired: 1982
- Plays: Right-handed (one-handed backhand)

Singles
- Career record: 274–269
- Career titles: 9
- Highest ranking: No. 36 (September 13, 1973)

Grand Slam singles results
- Australian Open: 2R (1977)
- French Open: 4R (1974, 1975)
- Wimbledon: 4R (1974)
- US Open: 3R (1979, 1980)

Doubles
- Career record: 288–178
- Career titles: 13
- Highest ranking: No. 35 (August 23, 1977)

Grand Slam doubles results
- Australian Open: F (1977)
- French Open: QF (1978)
- Wimbledon: F (1972)
- US Open: F (1971)

Team competitions
- Davis Cup: W (1972)

Erik van Dillen (born February 21, 1951) is an American retired tennis player who played over 25 Grand Slam championships at Australian Open, French Open, Wimbledon and US Open. He was active from 1964 to 1982 and won 9 careers singles titles.

== Tennis career ==
Born in San Mateo, California, van Dillen first played tennis aged six years old. During his junior career, he won both the singles and doubles competitions at the "USTA Boys 16 & 18 National Championships" in Kalamazoo, Michigan, as well as winning other national titles in the 12- and 14-year-old divisions. In total, he won 12 U.S. junior titles and is the only player ever to win singles and doubles titles in all four age groups: 12, 14, 16, and 18. (Source USTA Yearbooks).

Van Dillen first played on the men's circuit in 1967 when he appeared at the U.S. Championships for the first time. In 1968, he had his first big win when he beat his future doubles partner and then American No. 1 Charlie Pasarell at the U.S. national tournament at Boston in five sets when only 17. He was ranked in the top 20 of the U.S. from 1968 to 1970 and the top 10 from 1971 to 1973.

In 1973, he won his biggest tournament beating Frew McMillan in Nottingham. In 1974, van Dillen had his best Grand Slam singles year reaching the last 16 at the French Open where he narrowly lost to eventual champion Björn Borg in five sets. At Wimbledon, he also reached the last 16, defeating Guillermo Vilas on the way. He repeated the last 16 appearance in Paris in 1975.

In 1978, van Dillen had a strong grass-court season in England; he qualified at Nottingham and reached the last 16, and also won the doubles with Dick Stockton. At Wimbledon, he again qualified and then had the greatest win of his career defeating John McEnroe in five sets in the first round.

Van Dillen's last full year on the circuit was 1981 when he won two doubles titles and reached the semifinals of the Volvo International in North Conway with Roscoe Tanner. He also reached the semifinals in singles at Newport, Rhode Island.

He completed his career in 1982 by qualifying at his last singles event the prestigious Alan King Classic in Las Vegas and shortly after reached the final of the WCT Invitation event at Forest Hills in doubles with Dick Stockton.

Van Dillen played in the Wimbledon veterans doubles for a number of years and also played in a veterans event at Indian Wells.

Between 1960 and 1981, he beat six of the then-top players: John McEnroe, Stan Smith, Arthur Ashe, Jimmy Connors, Guillermo Vilas, and Ilie Năstase. At his peak, he was ranked 36th in the world in singles, and 35th in doubles.

== After tennis ==
Erik earned a degree in finance from the University of Southern California and an MBA from San Francisco State University. He joined IMG, a sports marketing agency. While at IMG, Erik worked with Joe Montana, Martina Navratilova, Arnold Palmer, Kristi Yamaguchi and Chris Evert and helped to build a number of sport and lifestyle events including the WTA Bank of the West Tennis Classic (formerly the Virginia Slims of Oakland), the US Open of Surfing (a 10-day sports and lifestyle exhibition), the Transamerica Seniors Golf Championship and the Escape from Alcatraz Triathlon.

After the death of Mark McCormack in 2003, Erik left the company to create van Dillen Partners, a sports and lifestyle marketing agency. The agency works with professional sports and media associations; such as the Association of Tennis Professionals (ATP), Women’s Tennis Association (WTA), Association of Volleyball Professionals (AVP), Association of Surfing Professionals (ASP), Stanford University Athletics, ESPN, NBC Sports, Fox Sports Net, ABC Sports and CBS Sports.

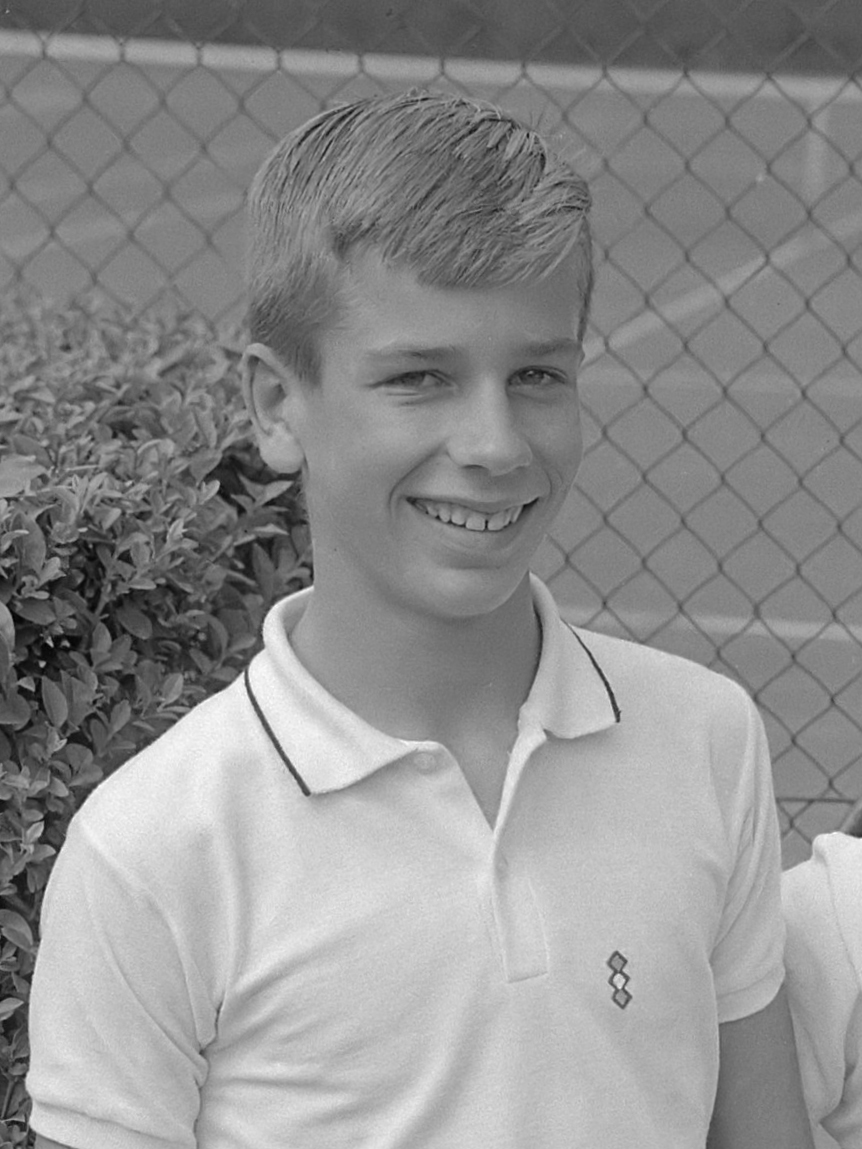
Erik van Dillen

== Career finals ==
=== Doubles (13 wins, 11 losses) ===
Result	W/L	Date	Tournament	Surface	Partner	Opponents	Score
Loss	0–1	Jun 1971	London Queen's, UK	Grass	(United States) Stan Smith	(Netherlands) Tom Okker (United States) Marty Riessen	6–8, 6–4, 8–10
Win	1–1	Aug 1971	Cincinnati, U.S.	Clay	(United States) Stan Smith	(United States) Sandy Mayer (United States) Roscoe Tanner	6–1, 3–6, 6–4
Loss	1–2	Aug 1971	Indianapolis, U.S.	Clay	(United States) Clark Graebner	(Socialist Federal Republic of Yugoslavia) Željko Franulović (Czechoslovakia) Jan Kodeš	6–7, 7–5, 3–6
Loss	1–3	Sep 1971	South Orange, U.S.	Hard	(United States) Clark Graebner	(Australia) Bob Carmichael (United States) Tom Leonard	4–6, 6–4, 4–6
Loss	1–4	Sep 1971	US Open, New York	Grass	(United States) Stan Smith	(Australia) John Newcombe (United Kingdom) Roger Taylor	7–6, 3–6, 6–7, 6–4, 6–7
Loss	1–5	Jul 1972	Wimbledon, London	Grass	(United States) Stan Smith	(South Africa) Bob Hewitt (South Africa) Frew McMillan	2–6, 2–6, 7–9
Win	2–5	Feb 1973	Copenhagen, Denmark	Carpet (i)	(United States) Tom Gorman	(United Kingdom) Mark Cox (United Kingdom) Graham Stilwell	6–4, 6–4
Loss	2–6	Apr 1973	Vancouver, Canada	Carpet (i)	(United States) Tom Gorman	(France) Pierre Barthès (United Kingdom) Roger Taylor	7–5, 3–6, 6–7
Loss	2–7	Apr 1973	Charlotte, U.S.	Clay	(United States) Tom Gorman	(Netherlands) Tom Okker (United States) Marty Riessen	6–7, 6–3, 3–6
Win	3–7	Jul 1973	Nottingham, UK	Grass	(United States) Tom Gorman	(Australia) Bob Carmichael (South Africa) Frew McMillan	6–4, 6–1
Win	4–7	Jun 1974	Nottingham, UK	Grass	(United States) Charlie Pasarell	(United States) Bob Lutz (United States) Stan Smith	6–4, 9–7
Loss	4–8	Jan 1975	Philadelphia, U.S.	Carpet (i)	(United States) Dick Stockton	(United States) Brian Gottfried (Mexico) Raúl Ramírez	6–3, 3–6, 6–7
Win	5–8	Feb 1975	Toronto, Canada	Carpet (i)	(United States) Dick Stockton	(India) Anand Amritraj (India) Vijay Amritraj	6–4, 7–5, 6–1
Win	6–8	Mar 1975	Memphis, U.S.	Carpet (i)	(United States) Dick Stockton	(United Kingdom) Mark Cox (South Africa) Cliff Drysdale	1–6, 7–5, 6–4
Win	7–8	Aug 1975	North Conway, U.S.	Clay	(Pakistan) Haroon Rahim	(Australia) John Alexander (Australia) Phil Dent	7–6, 7–6
Win	8–8	Jan 1976	Birmingham, U.S.	Carpet (i)	(United States) Jimmy Connors	(United States) Hank Pfister (United States) Dennis Ralston	7–6, 6–4
Win	9–8	Jul 1976	Cincinnati, U.S.	Clay	(United States) Stan Smith	(United States) Eddie Dibbs (United States) Harold Solomon	6–1, 6–1
Loss	9–9	Aug 1976	Louisville, U.S.	Clay	(United States) Stan Smith	(South Africa) Byron Bertram (South Africa) Pat Cramer	3–6, 4–6
Loss	9–10	Jan 1977	Australian Open	Grass	(United States) Charlie Pasarell	(United States) Arthur Ashe (Australia) Tony Roche	4–6, 4–6
Win	10–10	Aug 1978	New Orleans, U.S.	Carpet (i)	(United States) Dick Stockton	(Egypt) Ismail El Shafei (New Zealand) Brian Fairlie	7–6, 6–3
Win	11–10	Aug 1978	Cleveland, U.S.	Hard	(United States) Dick Stockton	(United States) Rick Fisher (United States) Bruce Manson	6–1, 6–4
Win	12–10	Jul 1981	Newport, U.S.	Grass	(Australia) Brad Drewett	(South Africa) Kevin Curren (United States) Billy Martin	6–2, 6–4
Win	13–10	Aug 1981	Cleveland, U.S.	Hard	(United States) Van Winitsky	(Australia) Syd Ball (Australia) Ross Case	6–4, 5–7, 7–5
Loss	13–11	May 1982	Forest Hills, U.S.	Clay	(United States) Dick Stockton	(United States) Tracy Delatte (United States) Johan Kriek	4–6, 6–3, 3–6
