= 1977 Australian Open (January) =

- Date: 3–9 January 1977
- Edition: 65th
- Category: Grand Slam (ITF)
- Surface: Grass
- Location: Melbourne, Victoria, Australia
- Venue: Kooyong Lawn Tennis Club

Champions

Men's singles
- (United States) Roscoe Tanner

Women's singles
- (Australia) Kerry Melville Reid

Men's doubles
- (United States) Arthur Ashe / (Australia) Tony Roche

Women's doubles
- (Australia) Dianne Fromholtz / (Australia) Helen Gourlay
- Australian Open

The 1977 Australian Open (January) was a tennis tournament played on outdoor grass courts at the Kooyong Lawn Tennis Club in Melbourne, Australia. The tournament was held from 3 to 9 January 1977. Due to a scheduling change, two Australian Opens took place in 1977 with the second taking place in December.

== Seniors ==
=== Men's singles ===
(United States) Roscoe Tanner defeated (Argentina) Guillermo Vilas, 6–3, 6–3, 6–3

- It was Tanner's 1st (and only) career Grand Slam title.

=== Women's singles ===
(Australia) Kerry Melville Reid defeated (Australia) Dianne Fromholtz, 7–5, 6–2

- It was Melville's 1st (and only) career Grand Slam title.

=== Men's doubles ===
(United States) Arthur Ashe / (Australia) Tony Roche defeated (United States) Charlie Pasarell / (United States) Erik van Dillen, 6–4, 6–4

=== Women's doubles ===
(Australia) Dianne Fromholtz / (Australia) Helen Gourlay defeated (Australia) Kerry Melville Reid / (United States) Betsy Nagelsen, 5–7, 6–1, 7–5

=== Mixed doubles ===
Competition not held between 1970 and 1986.

== Juniors ==
=== Boys' singles ===
(Australia) Brad Drewett defeated (United States) Tim Wilkison, 6–4, 7–6

=== Girls' singles ===
(Australia) Pamela Baily defeated (Australia) Amanda Tobin, 6–2, 6–3

Preceded by 1976 US Open	Grand Slams	Succeeded by 1977 French Open
