= Bill Lofgren =

American tennis player

- Full name: William Lofgren
- Country (sports): United States
- Born: July 31, 1948 (age 77)

Singles
- Career record: 4–21
- Highest ranking: No. 169 (July 2, 1977)

Grand Slam singles results
- Australian Open: 2R (1977)
- Wimbledon: 1R (1977)
- US Open: 1R (1977)

Doubles
- Career record: 7–18

Grand Slam doubles results
- Australian Open: 1R (1977)
- French Open: 2R (1977)
- US Open: 1R (1977)

William Lofgren (born July 31, 1948) is an American former professional tennis player.

A native of Peoria, Illinois, Lofgren played collegiate tennis for Bradley University was the Missouri Valley Conference singles champion in 1968. During the 1970s he was active on the professional tennis tour and featured at all four grand slam tournaments. He has had a long association with tennis in the city of Cincinnati, coaching at the Queen City Racquet Club in Glendale. In 2004 he was inducted into the Cincinnati Tennis Hall of Fame.
