= 1977 Australian Open (December) =

- Date: 19–31 December 1977
- Edition: 66th
- Category: Grand Slam (ITF)
- Surface: Grass
- Location: Melbourne, Victoria, Australia
- Venue: Kooyong Lawn Tennis Club

Champions

Men's singles
- (United States) Vitas Gerulaitis

Women's singles
- (Australia) Evonne Goolagong Cawley

Men's doubles
- (Australia) Ray Ruffels / (Australia) Allan Stone

Women's doubles
- (Australia) Evonne Goolagong Cawley / (Australia) Helen Gourlay Cawley (United States) Mona Schallau Guerrant / (Australia) Kerry Melville Reid
- Australian Open

The 1977 Australian Open (December) was a tennis tournament played on outdoor grass courts in Melbourne, Victoria, Australia. It was the 66th edition of the tournament and was held from 19 to 31 December 1977. Due to a scheduling change, two Australian Opens took place in 1977, with the first taking place in January. Vitas Gerulaitis and Evonne Goolagong Cawley won the singles titles.

== Seniors ==
=== Men's singles ===
(United States) Vitas Gerulaitis defeated (United Kingdom) John Lloyd, 6–3, 7–6^{(7–4)}, 5–7, 3–6, 6–2

- It was Gerulaitis's 1st (and only) career Grand Slam title.

=== Women's singles ===
(Australia) Evonne Goolagong Cawley defeated (Australia) Helen Gourlay Cawley, 6–3, 6–0

- It was Goolagong Cawley's 6th career Grand Slam title.

=== Men's doubles ===
(Australia) Ray Ruffels / (Australia) Allan Stone defeated (Australia) John Alexander / (Australia) Phil Dent, 7–6, 7–6

=== Women's doubles ===
(Australia) Evonne Goolagong Cawley / (Australia) Helen Gourlay Cawley vs. (United States) Mona Schallau Guerrant / (Australia) Kerry Melville Reid, shared due to rained out final

=== Mixed doubles ===
Competition not held between 1970 and 1986.

== Juniors ==
=== Boys' singles ===
(Australia) Ray Kelly

=== Girls' singles ===
(Australia) Amanda Tobin defeated (Australia) Leanne Harrison, 6–1, 6–2

Preceded by January 1977 Australian Open	Australian Open	Succeeded by 1978 Australian Open
Preceded by 1977 US Open	Grand Slams	Succeeded by 1978 French Open
