= Trish Bostrom =

American tennis player and lawyer

- Full name: Patricia Lynn Bostrom
- Country (sports): United States
- Born: November 25, 1951 (age 74)
- Plays: Right-handed

Singles
- Highest ranking: No. 37 (1977)

Grand Slam singles results
- Australian Open: 2R (1977, 1978)
- French Open: 3R (1973)
- Wimbledon: 2R (1973, 1976)
- US Open: 3R (1977)

Doubles
- Highest ranking: No. 5 (1975)

Grand Slam doubles results
- Australian Open: SF (1977)
- French Open: QF (1978)
- Wimbledon: 3R (1977, 1978)
- US Open: QF (1974, 1977)

Grand Slam mixed doubles results
- French Open: SF (1978)
- Wimbledon: 3R (1977)
- US Open: 1R (1973, 1974, 1975, 1977)

Patricia Lynn Bostrom (born November 25, 1951) is an American former professional tennis player. She is better known as Trish Bostrom, and after tennis, she became a lawyer in Washington.

Bostrom grew up in West Seattle, and she attended the University of Washington, winning the Pac-8 singles title in 1972. While at the university she was an advocate for gender equality in collegiate sports and successfully sued to be able to try out for a spot on the men's tennis team.

Graduating from the University of Washington in 1972, Bostrom competed on the professional tour for the remainder of the 1970s and played five seasons of World TeamTennis. She was a women's doubles semifinalist at the Australian Open and a mixed doubles semifinalist at the French Open.

== WTA Tour finals ==
=== Doubles: 3 (0-3) ===
| Result | No. | Date | Tournament | Surface | Partner | Opponents | Score |
|---|---|---|---|---|---|---|---|
| Loss | 1. | Mar, 1973 | Akron, United States | Carpet | (Belgium) Michèle Gurdal | (United States) Patti Hogan (United States) Sharon Walsh | 5–7, 4–6 |
| Loss | 2. | Nov, 1977 | Melbourne, Australia | Grass | (Australia) Kym Ruddell | (Australia) Evonne Goolagong Cawley (Netherlands) Betty Stöve | 3–6, 0–6 |
| Loss | 3. | Feb, 1978 | Seattle, United States | Carpet | (United States) Marita Redondo | (Australia) Kerry Reid (Australia) Wendy Turnbull | 2–6, 3–6 |
