= Richard Lewis (sports administrator) =

English sports administrator

Richard Lewis CBE
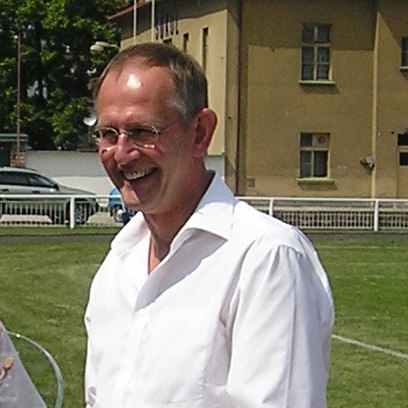
- in 2007
- Born: Richard Lewis; Middlesex, England
- Occupation: CEO Wimbledon Tennis
- Known for: Chairman of the RFL; Chair of the RLEF; Chair of Sport England; Director of Tennis, LTA; Professional Tennis player

Richard Lewis
- Country (sports): United Kingdom
- Born: 6 December 1954 (age 71)
- Turned pro: 1972
- Retired: 1985
- Plays: Left-handed

Singles
- Career record: 69–121
- Career titles: 0
- Highest ranking: No. 77 (31 December 1977)

Grand Slam singles results
- Australian Open: 3R (1977^{Jan})
- French Open: 1R (1976, 1977, 1978)
- Wimbledon: 3R (1976)
- US Open: 1R (1977)

Doubles
- Career record: 55–97
- Career titles: 0

Team competitions
- Davis Cup: F (1978), SF (1981)

Richard Alan Lewis, CBE (born 6 December 1954) is a former British Davis Cup tennis professional and sports administrator from Middlesex, United Kingdom.

He was the chief executive of The AELTC (Championships) Limited, organiser and host of The Championships, Wimbledon. Lewis took up the post in 2012, having been executive chairman of the Rugby Football League since 2002. On 1 April 2009 he replaced Michael Farrar as chairman of Sport England.

In 2020, after 8 years as chief executive, Lewis stepped down and he was succeeded by Sally Bolton. She became the first woman chief executive to hold that post.

== Tennis career ==
Lewis was a professional on the men's tennis circuit from 1972 to 1985. His best singles performance at a Grand Slam was reaching the third round of Wimbledon in 1976, where he defeated Patrick Proisy and Brian Teacher before losing to Nikola Pilić. In 1978, he helped Great Britain reach the Davis Cup final, and also played in the 1981 semi-finals. He reached as high as 77th in the world in the men's singles, winning matches against top players such as Adriano Panatta, Tony Roche, José Higueras, Miloslav Mečíř and Ilie Năstase.

== Administration ==
=== Lawn Tennis Association ===
After finishing his playing career, Lewis moved into sports administration joining the U.K. Lawn Tennis Association (LTA) in 1987, rising to become its director of tennis, but agreeing to leave his position in the wake of a 2000 loss to Ecuador that led to reduction of British tennis's status from "World" to "Euro-African Zone".

=== Rugby Football League ===
Within a year of joining the RFL, Lewis oversaw reunification with the British Amateur Rugby League Association (BARLA) after nearly 30 years of division.

Lewis, it was claimed by then Widnes Vikings chairman Tony Chambers, showed his strong expansionist credentials in 2005 when he allegedly threatened to resign if Super League clubs did not back a plan to save London Broncos, although he denies this.

Under Lewis, plans for a Super League licensing system were introduced.

Through his position at the RFL, Lewis has become Chair of the Rugby League European Federation and Deputy Chair of the Rugby League International Federation.

Following Nigel Wood's appointment as RFL Chief Executive in October 2007, Lewis's role increasingly focuses on developing rugby league in the UK and internationally.

In 2009, when Lewis took on the role of Chair of Sport England, his RFL title changed from Executive Chairman to Chairman.

Lewis was appointed Commander of the Order of the British Empire (CBE) in the 2013 Birthday Honours for services to sports administration.

=== All England Lawn Tennis and Croquet Club, Wimbledon ===
In April 2012, Lewis was appointed Chief Executive Officer at Wimbledon following a successful career at the RFL and Chair of Sport England. He replaced Ian Ritchie, who in turn moved on to become chief executive of the Rugby Football Union. During his tenure, Lewis has led the AELTC through the announcement of the Wimbledon Master Plan, the launch of Wimbledon's first consumer-facing brand campaign, "In Pursuit of Greatness", and presided over significant growth of The Championships to become one of the world's biggest annual sporting events.
