= Robin Drysdale =

British tennis player

- Country (sports): United Kingdom
- Residence: Fulham, London, UK
- Born: 18 September 1952 (age 72); Dedham, Essex, UK
- Height: 1.89 m (6 ft 2 in)
- Plays: Right-handed

Singles
- Career record: 31–73
- Career titles: 0
- Highest ranking: No. 60 (6 March 1978)

Grand Slam singles results
- Australian Open: QF (1977^{Dec})
- French Open: 1R (1977, 1978)
- Wimbledon: 2R (1975, 1978)
- US Open: 2R (1978)

Doubles
- Career record: 57–72
- Career titles: 1
- Highest ranking: No. 300 (2 January 1984)

Grand Slam doubles results
- Australian Open: 3R (1976, 1977)
- Wimbledon: 3R (1976)
- US Open: 1R (1978)

Robin Drysdale (born 18 September 1952) is a former professional tennis player from Great Britain.

A native of Dedham, Essex, Drysdale is well known for being a quarterfinalist at the December edition of the 1977 Australian Open.

== Career finals ==
=== Singles (1 runner-up) ===
Result	W/L	Date	Tournament	Surface	Opponent	Score
Loss	0–1	Mar 1978	Lagos, Nigeria	Clay	(Sweden) Kjell Johansson	8–9, 3–6

=== Doubles (1 title, 2 runner-ups) ===
Result	W/L	Date	Tournament	Surface	Partner	Opponents	Score
Win	1–0	Aug 1978	North Conway, U.S.	Clay	(United States) Van Winitsky	(United States) Mike Fishbach (South Africa) Bernard Mitton	4–6, 7–6, 6–3
Loss	1–1	Mar 1979	Nancy, France	Hard (i)	(United Kingdom) Andrew Jarrett	(West Germany) Klaus Eberhard (West Germany) Karl Meiler	6–4, 6–7, 3–6
Loss	1–2	Sep 1979	Madrid, Spain	Clay	(United Kingdom) John Feaver	(Brazil) Carlos Kirmayr (Brazil) Cássio Motta	6–7, 4–6
