= Nerida Gregory =

Australian tennis player

- Full name: Nerida Gregory
- Country (sports): Australia
- Born: 13 May 1956 (age 69); Bundaberg, Australia

Singles

Grand Slam singles results
- Australian Open: 3R (1975)
- French Open: 1R (1976, 1978, 1981)
- Wimbledon: 2R (1974, 1980)
- US Open: 1R (1981)

Doubles

Grand Slam doubles results
- Australian Open: QF (1977 (Jan), 1977 (Dec))
- French Open: 3R (1981)
- Wimbledon: 3R (1974)
- US Open: 2R (1977)

Nerida Gregory (born 13 May 1956) is a former professional tennis player from Australia.

== Biography ==
Gregory, who comes from Bundaberg in Queensland, won back-to-back Australian Open girls' doubles junior titles in 1974 and 1975.

She featured in the main draw of all grand slam tournaments during her career. At the 1975 Australian Open, in addition to winning the girls' doubles, she also competed in the women's singles and made the third round, with wins over Dianne Evers and Pam Whytcross. At both the January and December editions of the Australian Open in 1977 she partnered with Jan Wilton to make the quarter-finals of the women's doubles .

In 1980 she won the Australian Hard Court Championships, a non tour event, and also made the final of three WTA Tour tournaments. During her tour of Japan in October, she lost the doubles final in Nagoya, then was runner-up in both the singles and doubles events at the Japan Open in Tokyo.

She continued competing on tour until 1984 and while she didn't reach any further finals, she did have some notable wins. In 1981 she overcame a deficit of 0–6, 1–5, to win against three-time grand slam champion Virginia Wade, at the Family Circle Cup in South Carolina. At Wimbledon in 1983 she beat Steffi Graf in the second round of qualifying.

== WTA Tour finals ==
=== Singles (0–1) ===
Result	W/L	Date	Tournament	Tier	Surface	Opponent	Score
Loss	0–1	Oct 1980	Tokyo, Japan	$50,000 (Colgate)	Hard	(Romania) Mariana Simionescu	4–6, 4–6

=== Doubles (0–2) ===
Result	W/L	Date	Tournament	Tier	Surface	Partner	Opponents	Score
Loss	0–1	Oct 1980	Nagoya, Japan	$50,000 (Colgate)	Hard	(Hungary) Marie Pinterová	(United States) Lindsay Morse (United States) Jean Nachand	3–6, 1–6
Loss	0–2	Oct 1980	Tokyo, Japan	$50,000 (Colgate)	Hard	(Hungary) Marie Pinterová	(United States) Dana Gilbert (United States) Mareen Louie	5–7, 6–7
