= Kym Ruddell =

Australian tennis player

- Country (sports): Australia
- Born: 19 July 1955 (age 71)

Grand Slam singles results
- Australian Open: 1R (1975, 1976, 1977^{Jan}, 1977^{Dec}, 1978, 1979)
- French Open: Q3 (1977)
- Wimbledon: Q3 (1975, 1979)
- US Open: Q2 (1978)

Grand Slam doubles results
- Australian Open: SF (1977^{Jan}, 1977^{Dec})
- French Open: QF (1978)
- Wimbledon: 3R (1978)
- US Open: 2R (1978, 1979)

Kym Ruddell (born 19 July 1955) is an Australian former professional tennis player.

While competing on tour, Ruddell appeared in every Australian Open from 1974 to 1980. She was most successful in women's doubles, reaching the semifinals twice and the quarterfinals two times.

Ruddell was runner-up to Judy Tegart-Dalton at the 1975 Australian Hard Court Championships. She was also a doubles finalist in two WTA Tour level tournaments during her career.

In 1977, Ruddell partnered with Karen Krantzcke to win a doubles tournament in Tallahassee. After they won the final and were due to pick up their winner's cheques, Krantzcke decided to go for a jog and suffered a fatal heart attack around 200 metres from the courts.

== Grand Slam tournaments Performance timeline ==
Key
W	F	SF	QF	#R	RR	Q#	DNQ	A	NH

(W) winner; (F) finalist; (SF) semifinalist; (QF) quarterfinalist; (#R) rounds 4, 3, 2, 1; (RR) round-robin stage; (Q#) qualification round; (DNQ) did not qualify; (A) absent; (NH) not held; (SR) strike rate (events won / competed); (W–L) win–loss record.

=== Singles ===
Tournament	1975	1976	1977	1978	1979	SR	W–L	Win %
Australian Open	1R	1R				/	–	–
French Open						/	–	–
Wimbledon					/	–	–	
US Open						/	–	–
Win–loss						/	–	–

=== Doubles ===
Tournament	1975	1976	1977	1978	1979	SR	W–L	Win %
Australian Open						/	–	–
French Open						/	–	–
Wimbledon				3R		/	–	–
US Open				2R	2R	/	–	–
Win–loss						/	–	–

== WTA Tour finals ==
=== Doubles (0–2) ===
Result	W/L	Date	Tournament	Surface	Partner	Opponents	Score
Loss	0–1	Nov 1977	Melbourne, Australia	Grass	(United States) Patricia Bostrom	(Australia) Evonne Goolagong Cawley (Netherlands) Betty Stöve	3–6, 0–6
Loss	0–2	Dec 1979	Sydney, Australia	Grass	(United States) Barbara Jordan	(United States) Diane Desfor (United States) Barbara Hallquist	6–4, 2–6, 2–6
