= Helen Gourlay =

Australian tennis player

- Full name: Helen Gourlay Cawley
- Country (sports): Australia
- Born: 23 December 1946 (age 79) Launceston, Australia
- Height: 168 cm (5 ft 6 in)
- Retired: 1978
- Plays: Right-handed

Singles
- Career record: no value
- Highest ranking: No. 12 (1971)

Grand Slam singles results
- Australian Open: F (1977^{Dec})
- French Open: F (1971)
- Wimbledon: 4R (1968, 1972, 1977)
- US Open: QF (1970)

Doubles
- Career record: no value
- Career titles: 20

Grand Slam doubles results
- Australian Open: W (1972, 1976, 1977, 1977)
- French Open: F (1971, 1977)
- Wimbledon: W (1977)
- US Open: QF (1971, 1974)

Grand Slam mixed doubles results
- Australian Open: 2R (1967)
- French Open: SF (1966)
- Wimbledon: SF (1970, 1974)
- US Open: QF (1971)

Helen Gourlay Cawley (née Gourlay; born 23 December 1946) is a retired tennis player from Australia.

== Personal ==
Helen Gourlay was born in Launceston, Tasmania, Australia. She married Richard Leon Cawley in January 1977, and married William Timothy Cape in October 1986.

== Career ==
Gourlay reached the singles final of two Grand Slam tournaments, losing the 1971 French Open and the December 1977 Australian Open to countrywoman Evonne Goolagong.

An operation on her elbow sidelined her for 10 months in 1973.

In women's doubles, Gourlay was a four-time winner of the Australian Open (1972, 1976, 1977 (January), 1977 (December)). She won Wimbledon in 1977 partnering JoAnne Russell and was the runner-up there in 1974 with Karen Krantzcke. Gourlay was twice the runner-up at the French Open in 1971 with Kerry Harris and 1977 with Rayni Fox. In 1977, Gourlay played in four of the five Grand Slam Women's Doubles finals (the Australian Open was contested twice), only failing to reach the US Open final, where she lost in the second round with JoAnne Russell.

== Grand Slam finals ==
=== Singles (2 runner-ups) ===
Result	Year	Championship	Surface	Opponent	Score
Loss	1971	French Open	Clay	(Australia) Evonne Goolagong	3–6, 5–7
Loss	1977^{(Dec)}	Australian Open	Grass	(Australia) Evonne Goolagong	3–6, 0–6

=== Doubles (5 titles, 3 runner-ups) ===
Result	Year	Championship	Surface	Partner	Opponents	Score
Loss	1971	French Open	Clay	(Australia) Kerry Harris	(France) Françoise Dürr (France) Gail Chanfreau	4–6, 1–6
Win	1972	Australian Open	Grass	(Australia) Kerry Harris	(Australia) Patricia Coleman (Australia) Karen Krantzcke	6–0, 6–4
Loss	1974	Wimbledon	Grass	(Australia) Karen Krantzcke	(Australia) Evonne Goolagong (United States) Peggy Michel	6–2, 4–6, 3–6
Win	1976	Australian Open	Grass	(Australia) Evonne Goolagong	(Czechoslovakia) Renáta Tomanová (Australia) Lesley Turner Bowrey	8–1
Win	1977^{(Jan)}	Australian Open	Grass	(Australia) Dianne Fromholtz	(Australia) Kerry Melville Reid (United States) Betsy Nagelsen	5–7, 6–1, 7–5
Loss	1977	French Open	Clay	(United States) Rayni Fox	(Czechoslovakia) Regina Maršíková (United States) Pam Teeguarden	7–5, 4–6, 2–6
Win	1977	Wimbledon	Grass	(United States) JoAnne Russell	(United States) Martina Navratilova (Netherlands) Betty Stöve	6–3, 6–3
Win	1977^{(Dec)}	Australian Open	Grass	(Australia) Evonne Goolagong	(United States) Mona Guerrant (Australia) Kerry Melville Reid	Shared

Note: Evonne Goolagong occasionally is credited incorrectly with winning the 1977 Ladies Doubles event at Wimbledon, due to the confusion regarding the married names of both Goolagong and her compatriot Gourlay who took the trophy. Both women were listed in tournaments as Mrs. R. Cawley (Goolagong was Mrs. R.A. Cawley and Gourlay was Mrs. R.L. Cawley). Goolagong did not participate at Wimbledon 1977.

== Grand Slam singles tournament timeline ==
Key
W	F	SF	QF	#R	RR	Q#	DNQ	A	NH

(W) winner; (F) finalist; (SF) semifinalist; (QF) quarterfinalist; (#R) rounds 4, 3, 2, 1; (RR) round-robin stage; (Q#) qualification round; (DNQ) did not qualify; (A) absent; (NH) not held; (SR) strike rate (events won / competed); (W–L) win–loss record.

Tournament	1964	1965	1966	1967	1968	1969	1970	1971	1972	1973	1974	1975	1976	1977		1978	1979	1980	Career SR
Australia	QF	3R	3R	2R	1R	QF	A	QF	SF	A	2R	2R	SF	SF	F	A	A	1R	0 / 14
France	A	A	1R	3R	3R	2R	1R	F	4R	A	A	A	A	3R		A	A	A	0 / 8
Wimbledon	A	A	2R	1R	4R	3R	2R	1R	4R	1R	3R	2R	A	4R		2R	A	A	0 / 11
United States	A	A	A	A	A	A	QF	2R	1R	1R	2R	2R	3R	2R		A	A	A	0 / 8
SR	0 / 1	0 / 1	0 / 3	0 / 3	0 / 3	0 / 3	0 / 3	0 / 4	0 / 4	0 / 2	0 / 3	0 / 3	0 / 2	0 / 5		0 / 1	0 / 0	0 / 1	0 / 41

Note: The Australian Open was held twice in 1977, in January and December.

== Coaching ==
Gourlay was coached by Brian Hudson for over 10 years. She lived with Hudson, his wife Beryl and their children for three years while he coached her for free at his Granville (Sydney) tennis courts (1963-1965). Gourlay and Hudson played mixed doubles at White City (1968) and Wimbledon (1972). Gourlay also was coached by Hudson at his Terranora court, leading into many international events, including Grand Slams. Hudson coached Gourlay in the 1977 Australian Open, in which Gourlay defeated Sue Barker in the semifinals.

Gourlay was one of the inaugural coaches of the Australian Institute of Sport tennis program when it was established in Canberra in 1981. Gourlay left the program in 1986.

== Recognition ==
In 1987, she was inducted into the Tasmanian Sporting Hall of Fame, and in 2000, she received the Australian Sports Medal.

== See also ==
- Performance timelines for all female tennis players since 1978 who reached at least one Grand Slam final
