= 1977 Australian Open (January) – Men's singles =

Men's singles tennis title

Men's singles
- 1977 Australian Open (January)

Final
- Champion: (United States) Roscoe Tanner
- Runner-up: (Argentina) Guillermo Vilas
- Score: 6–3, 6–3, 6–3

Details
- Draw: 64
- Seeds: 4

Events
| Singles | men | women |
| Doubles | men | women |
- Australian Open (January)

Roscoe Tanner defeated Guillermo Vilas in the final, 6–3, 6–3, 6–3 to win the men's singles tennis title at the January 1977 Australian Open. It was his first and only major singles title. Tanner was making his tournament debut. This was the first Australian Open men's singles final since 1912 not to feature an Australian player.

Mark Edmondson was the defending champion, but lost in the quarterfinals to Ken Rosewall.

== Seeds ==
The seeded players are listed below. Roscoe Tanner is the champion; others show the round in which they were eliminated.

1. (Argentina) Guillermo Vilas (final)
2. (United States) Roscoe Tanner (champion)
3. (United States) Arthur Ashe (quarterfinals)
4. (Australia) Ken Rosewall (semifinals)

== Draw ==
=== Key ===
- Q = Qualifier
- WC = Wild card
- LL = Lucky loser
- r = Retired

=== Final eight ===
Quarterfinals
1 | (Argentina) Guillermo Vilas | 6 | 7 | 1 | 6
(Australia) Ross Case | 4 | 5 | 6 | 3
3 | (United States) Arthur Ashe | 3 | 4 | 6 | 6
(Australia) John Alexander | 6 | 6 | 4 | 7
(Australia) Mark Edmondson | 4 | 6 | 6 | 4
4 | (Australia) Ken Rosewall | 6 | 7 | 4 | 6
(Australia) Phil Dent | 3 | 4 | 2
2 | (United States) Roscoe Tanner | 6 | 6 | 6

Semifinals
1 | (Argentina) Guillermo Vilas | 6 | 1 | 6 | 6
(Australia) John Alexander | 4 | 6 | 3 | 4
4 | (Australia) Ken Rosewall | 4 | 6 | 4 | 1
2 | (United States) Roscoe Tanner | 6 | 3 | 6 | 6

Final
1 | (Argentina) Guillermo Vilas | 3 | 3 | 3
2 | (United States) Roscoe Tanner | 6 | 6 | 6

=== Section 1 ===
First round
1 | (Argentina) G Vilas | 6 | 6 | 6
(Australia) P McNamee | 2 | 4 | 2
(United States) N Saviano | 7 | 7 | 6
(United States) T Wilkison | 5 | 6 | 4
(United States) C Pasarell | 2 | 7 | 6 | 7
(South Africa) B Hewitt | 6 | 6 | 2 | 6
(United Kingdom) R Drysdale | 3 | 2 | 4
(Australia) S Docherty | 6 | 6 | 6
(United States) D Stockton | 2 | 7 | 6 | 7
(United Kingdom) J Feaver | 6 | 6 | 2 | 6
(Australia) C Fancutt | 4 | 4 | 7 | 6 | 6
(Australia) A Gardiner | 6 | 6 | 6 | 4 | 4
(Australia) R Case | 3 | 6 | 7 | 6
(New Zealand) C Lewis | 6 | 1 | 6 | 1
(Australia) B Drewett | 6 | 3 | 1 | 1
(Australia) B Lloyd | 4 | 6 | 6 | 6

Second round
1 | (Argentina) G Vilas | 6 | 6 | 6
(United States) N Saviano | 1 | 4 | 4
(United States) C Pasarell | 7 | 7 | 6
(Australia) S Docherty | 6 | 6 | 4
(United States) D Stockton | 6 | 6 | 6
(Australia) C Fancutt | 2 | 2 | 3
(Australia) R Case | 6 | 6 | 6
(Australia) B Lloyd | 3 | 3 | 1

Third round
1 | (Argentina) G Vilas | 7 | 6 | 6
(United States) C Pasarell | 6 | 2 | 3
(United States) D Stockton | 4 | 6 | 7 | 5 | 2
(Australia) R Case | 6 | 4 | 6 | 7 | 6

Quarterfinals
1 | (Argentina) G Vilas | 6 | 7 | 1 | 6
(Australia) R Case | 4 | 5 | 6 | 3

=== Section 2 ===
First round
3 | (United States) A Ashe | 6 | 6 | 6
(Australia) P McNamara | 3 | 0 | 3
LL | (West Germany) H Elschenbroich | 6 | 3 | 3 | 3
(United States) DR Bohrnstedt | 3 | 6 | 6 | 6
(Australia) G Masters | 6 | 3 | 0 | 3
(United States) H Pfister | 3 | 6 | 6 | 6
(Australia) A Stone | 3 | 7 | 1 | 4
(Australia) C Letcher | 6 | 6 | 6 | 6
(Australia) R Ruffels | 7 | 6 | 6
(Australia) P Kronk | 5 | 1 | 4
(Australia) C Dibley | 6 | 6 | 6
(Australia) K Warwick | 1 | 3 | 2
(Australia) J Alexander | 7 | 7 | 6 | 6
(United States) M Machette | 6 | 6 | 7 | 4
(West Germany) U Marten | 6 | 7 | 6
Q | (Australia) G Thomson | 2 | 5 | 3

Second round
3 | (United States) A Ashe | 7 | 7 | 6
(United States) DR Bohrnstedt | 6 | 5 | 4
(United States) H Pfister | 4 | 6 | 6 | 6
(Australia) C Letcher | 6 | 1 | 4 | 1
(Australia) R Ruffels | 6 | 6 | 3 | 6 | 1
(Australia) C Dibley | 4 | 2 | 6 | 7 | 6
(Australia) J Alexander | 6 | 6 | 5 | 6
(West Germany) U Marten | 2 | 4 | 7 | 4

Third round
3 | (United States) A Ashe | 7 | 6 | 3 | 6
(United States) H Pfister | 6 | 3 | 6 | 3
(Australia) C Dibley | 4 | 2 | 2
(Australia) J Alexander | 6 | 6 | 6

Quarterfinals
3 | (United States) A Ashe | 3 | 4 | 6 | 6
(Australia) J Alexander | 6 | 6 | 4 | 7

=== Section 3 ===
First round
(Australia) B Giltinan | 2 | 7 | 4 | 4
(United Kingdom) R Lewis | 6 | 6 | 6 | 6
(New Zealand) R Simpson | 3 | 2 | 2
(United States) T Gorman | 6 | 6 | 6
(Australia) J Bartlett | 7 | 6 | 4 | 6
(Australia) J Trickey | 6 | 2 | 6 | 4
Q | (Australia) B Carmichael | 4 | 3 | 3
(Australia) M Edmondson | 6 | 6 | 6
(United States) E van Dillen | 6 | 6 | 6
(Australia) C Kachel | 3 | 2 | 0
(United States) JC Hagey | 6 | 6 | 3 | 6 | 3
(United States) M Riessen | 7 | 2 | 6 | 3 | 6
Q | (Australia) P Campbell | 0 | 4 | 4
(Romania) I Țiriac | 6 | 6 | 6
(Australia) S Ball | 2 | 3 | 5
4 | (Australia) K Rosewall | 6 | 6 | 7

Second round
(United Kingdom) R Lewis | 6 | 6 | 6
(United States) T Gorman | 4 | 3 | 1
(Australia) J Bartlett | 4 | 6 | 1 | 2
(Australia) M Edmondson | 6 | 1 | 6 | 6
(United States) E van Dillen | 6 | 6 | 3
(United States) M Riessen | 7 | 7 | 6
(Romania) I Țiriac | 4 | 6 | 4
4 | (Australia) K Rosewall | 6 | 7 | 6

Third round
(United Kingdom) R Lewis | 1 | 3 | 3
(Australia) M Edmondson | 6 | 6 | 6
(United States) M Riessen | 7 | 6 | 5 | 6 | 4
4 | (Australia) K Rosewall | 6 | 7 | 7 | 3 | 6

Quarterfinals
(Australia) M Edmondson | 4 | 6 | 6 | 4
4 | (Australia) K Rosewall | 6 | 7 | 4 | 6

=== Section 4 ===
First round
(United States) S Stewart | 6 | 6 | 6 | 7
(United States) GR Reid | 7 | 3 | 4 | 6
(Australia) J James | 5 | 6 | 2
(Australia) P Dent | 7 | 7 | 6
(West Germany) W Zirngibl | 6 | 3 | 6 | 6
(Australia) J Marks | 4 | 6 | 2 | 1
(United States) V Amaya | 3 | 6 | 6 | 6 | 5
(Australia) D Crealy | 6 | 1 | 7 | 1 | 7
Q | (United States) W Lofgren | 6 | 6 | 6
LL | (Australia) S Meyers | 3 | 2 | 3
Q | (Australia) W Maher | 6 | 3 | 0
(Australia) T Roche | 7 | 6 | 6
(United States) P Fleming | 6 | 5 | 6 | 6
(Australia) B Phillips-Moore | 0 | 7 | 1 | 2
(United States) B Teacher | 3 | 7 | 3 | 5
2 | (United States) R Tanner | 6 | 5 | 6 | 7

Second round
(United States) S Stewart | 4 | 3 | 3
(Australia) P Dent | 6 | 6 | 6
(West Germany) W Zirngibl | 5 | 6 | 0 | r.
(Australia) D Crealy | 7 | 7 | 3
Q | (United States) W Lofgren | 1 | 0 | 2
(Australia) T Roche | 6 | 6 | 6
(United States) P Fleming | 6 | 2 | 1
2 | (United States) R Tanner | 7 | 6 | 6

Third round
(Australia) P Dent | 6 | 6 | 7
(Australia) D Crealy | 3 | 3 | 6
(Australia) T Roche | 6 | 1 | 2 | 1
2 | (United States) R Tanner | 4 | 6 | 6 | 6

Quarterfinals
(Australia) P Dent | 3 | 4 | 2
2 | (United States) R Tanner | 6 | 6 | 6

| Preceded by 1976 US Open | Grand Slam men's singles | Succeeded by 1977 French Open |
