= Amanda Tobin =

Australian tennis player

- Country (sports): Australia
- Born: 8 June 1960 (age 64); Bathurst, Australia
- Plays: Right-handed

Singles

Grand Slam singles results
- Australian Open: 3R (1985)
- French Open: 2R (1978, 1981)
- Wimbledon: 3R (1979)
- US Open: 3R (1978)

Doubles
- Career titles: 0
- Highest ranking: No. 131 (15 March 1987)

Grand Slam doubles results
- Australian Open: QF (1977, 1978)
- French Open: 3R (1982)
- Wimbledon: 2R (1986)
- US Open: 2R (1979)

Amanda Tobin (born 8 June 1960), now known as Amanda Chaplin, is a former professional tennis player from Australia. She also competed as Amanda Tobin-Evans and Amanda Tobin-Dingwall.

== Biography ==
=== Early years ===
Tobin was born in Bathurst and grew up in the Illawarra, where she attended Oak Flats High School. She competed in all junior Grand Slam events, where she was a quarterfinalist at the US and Wimbledon girls singles event and a semifinalist at the French Open girls' singles. She was the winner of the 1977 Australian Open Junior title.

Amanda was ranked Number 1 in Australia for all her junior age groups. Her highest World Junior ranking was Number 2.

Amanda represented Australia on 17 occasions and was runner up in the World Junior Championships in Stockholm in late 1977.

=== Professional career ===
While still a teenager she made back-to-back quarter-finals in the women's doubles at the Australian Open, partnering Kerryn Pratt in 1977 and Leanne Harrison in 1978. As a singles player she made the third round of a Grand Slam on three occasions over the course of her career, at the 1978 US Open, 1979 Wimbledon Championships and 1985 Australian Open. In Grand Slam competition she twice came up against Martina Navratilova, who on both occasions went on to win the event, at the 1981 Australian Open and 1986 Wimbledon Championships.

Tobin spent a decade competing on the WTA Tour. Her best performances include making the quarter-finals of the singles draw at the NSW Open in 1977 and also Adelaide in 1980, as well as semi-final appearances in doubles at Perth in 1981 and Tokyo in 1986.

She was the singles champion and doubles runner-up at the Dunlop masters in Tokyo. Tobin was the Western Australian Open singles champion on five occasions. In 1983 she was the runner up in the Wimbledon Plate Singles event with wins over former top 10 players. Amanda's highest world senior ranking was No. 58.

She has the distinction of being the last player to beat Evonne Goolagong Cawley on tour, which she did at the 1985 Australian Indoor tournament, ending the career of the former world number one.

=== Personal life ===
Tobin married first husband Mark Evans in 1980. Her second husband was Greg Dingwall, with whom she played in the mixed doubles at the 1983 Wimbledon Championships.

She is married to Vince Chaplin. She has two sons, one of their sons, Jarryd Chaplin, is a professional tennis player.

Since the 1990s she has worked as a tennis coach, most recently as the head coach at Kambala Girls School, Rose Bay.
