= 1981 Wimbledon Championships – Mixed doubles =

Mixed doubles
- 1981 Wimbledon Championships

Final
- Champions: (South Africa) Frew McMillan (Netherlands) Betty Stöve
- Runners-up: (United States) John Austin (United States) Tracy Austin
- Score: 4–6, 7–6^{(7–2)}, 6–3

Details
- Draw: 48 (3 Q )
- Seeds: 8

Events
Singles	men	women		boys	girls
Doubles	men	women	mixed	boys	girls
← 1980 ·	Wimbledon Championships	· 1982 →

Frew McMillan and Betty Stöve defeated the defending champions John and Tracy Austin in the final, 4–6, 7–6^{(7–2)}, 6–3 to win the mixed doubles tennis title at the 1981 Wimbledon Championships.

== Seeds ==
1. (United States) John Austin / (United States) Tracy Austin (final)
2. (South Africa) Frew McMillan / (Netherlands) Betty Stöve (champions)
3. (United States) Marty Riessen / (Australia) Wendy Turnbull (third round)
4. n/a
5. (Australia) Mark Edmondson / (Australia) Dianne Fromholtz (first round)
6. (United States) Steve Denton / (United States) Anne Smith (first round)
7. (South Africa) Kevin Curren / (South Africa) Tanya Harford (quarterfinals)
8. n/a

Click on the seed number of a player to go to their draw section.

== Draw ==
=== Key ===
- Q = Qualifier
- WC = Wild card
- LL = Lucky loser
- Alt = Alternate
- SE = Special exempt
- PR = Protected ranking
- ITF = ITF entry
- JE = Junior exempt
- w/o = Walkover
- r = Retired
- d = Defaulted
- SR = Special ranking

=== Finals ===
Quarterfinals
1	(United States) John Austin (United States) Tracy Austin	6	3	7
(India) Vijay Amritraj (United Kingdom) Virginia Wade	4	6	5
(Australia) Tony Roche (West Germany) Bettina Bunge	6	7
(Australia) Chris Johnstone (Australia) Pam Whytcross	3	6
(United States) Cary Leeds (United States) Sherry Acker	6	6
(United Kingdom) John Feaver (United Kingdom) Lesley Charles	4	3
7	(South Africa) Kevin Curren (South Africa) Tanya Harford	7	5	1
2	(South Africa) Frew McMillan (Netherlands) Betty Stöve	6	7	6

Semifinals
1	(United States) John Austin (United States) Tracy Austin	6	7
(Australia) Tony Roche (West Germany) Bettina Bunge	2	6
(United States) Cary Leeds (United States) Sherry Acker	6	1	2
2	(South Africa) Frew McMillan (Netherlands) Betty Stöve	4	6	6

Final
1	(United States) John Austin (United States) Tracy Austin	6	6^{2}	3
2	(South Africa) Frew McMillan (Netherlands) Betty Stöve	4	7^{7}	6

=== Top half ===
==== Section 1 ====
First round
1	(United States) J Austin (United States) T Austin	6	6	6
(United States) S Krulevitz (Romania) L Romanov	7	2	2
(United States) A Giammalva (United States) M-L Piatek
(United States) S Meister (United States) J Portman	w/o
(United States) F McNair (West Germany) C Kohde	w/o
LL	(South Africa) D Visser (South Africa) S Rollinson
(United States) D Ralston (United States) S Walsh	3	7	3
(India) V Amritraj (United Kingdom) V Wade	6	6	6

Second round
1	(United States) J Austin (United States) T Austin	6	7
(Australia) B Drewett (United States) J Stratton	4	6
(United States) S Meister (United States) J Portman
(Australia) D Carter (United States) W White	w/o
(Australia) P McNamara (Australia) E Little
(United States) F McNair (West Germany) C Kohde	w/o
(India) V Amritraj (United Kingdom) V Wade	6	6
LL	(United Kingdom) M Guntrip (United States) H Ludloff	2	3

Third round
1	(United States) J Austin (United States) T Austin	6	7
(Australia) D Carter (United States) W White	2	5
(United States) F McNair (West Germany) C Kohde	3	4
(India) V Amritraj (United Kingdom) V Wade	6	6

Quarterfinals
1	(United States) J Austin (United States) T Austin	6	3	7
(India) V Amritraj (United Kingdom) V Wade	4	6	5

==== Section 2 ====
First round
3	(United States) M Riessen (Australia) W Turnbull	7	6
(United States) C Skakle (United States) K Jones	5	3
(South Africa) R Moore (South Africa) R Uys	1	3
(Australia) A Roche (West Germany) B Bunge	6	6
(Australia) C Johnstone (Australia) P Whytcross	6	6	6
(South Africa) B Mitton (South Africa) I Kloss	7	3	4
(United States) E Fromm (United States) D Desfor	6	3	6
6	(United States) S Denton (United States) A Smith	2	6	2

Second round
3	(United States) M Riessen (Australia) W Turnbull	6	6
Q	(Australia) C Fancutt (Australia) S Saliba	3	4
(Netherlands) T Okker (Netherlands) M Mesker	4	6	7
(Australia) A Roche (West Germany) B Bunge	6	1	9
(Australia) C Johnstone (Australia) P Whytcross	6	7
(New Zealand) O Parun (New Zealand) C Newton	3	6
(United Kingdom) D Lloyd (United States) R Casals	3	7	8
(United States) E Fromm (United States) D Desfor	6	5	10

Third round
3	(United States) M Riessen (Australia) W Turnbull	3	6
(Australia) A Roche (West Germany) B Bunge	6	7
(Australia) C Johnstone (Australia) P Whytcross	6	6
(United States) E Fromm (United States) D Desfor	2	2

Quarterfinals
(Australia) A Roche (West Germany) B Bunge	6	7
(Australia) C Johnstone (Australia) P Whytcross	3	6

=== Bottom half ===
==== Section 3 ====
First round
5	(Australia) M Edmondson (Australia) D Fromholtz	5	6
(United Kingdom) J Bates (United Kingdom) J Durie	7	7
(United States) R Van't Hof (United States) A White	4	7	5
(United States) C Leeds (United States) S Acker	6	6	7
(South Africa) S van der Merwe (South Africa) Y Vermaak	6	5	11
(South Africa) J Yuill (United States) J Goodling	4	7	13
(United States) M Hunter (United States) L Allen
(United Kingdom) J Feaver (United Kingdom) L Charles	w/o

Second round
(United Kingdom) J Bates (United Kingdom) J Durie	7	6
(India) A Amritraj (United Kingdom) A Hobbs	6	3
(United Kingdom) R Beven (United Kingdom) L Geeves	2	1
(United States) C Leeds (United States) S Acker	6	6
(Czechoslovakia) P Složil (Czechoslovakia) R Tomanová	6	6
(South Africa) J Yuill (United States) J Goodling	2	4
(United Kingdom) J Feaver (United Kingdom) L Charles	6	6
LL	(Japan) J Kamiwazumi (Japan) N Sato	3	2

Third round
(United Kingdom) J Bates (United Kingdom) J Durie	4	4
(United States) C Leeds (United States) S Acker	6	6
(Czechoslovakia) P Složil (Czechoslovakia) R Tomanová	6	4
(United Kingdom) J Feaver (United Kingdom) L Charles	7	6

Quarterfinals
(United States) C Leeds (United States) S Acker	6	6
(United Kingdom) J Feaver (United Kingdom) L Charles	4	3

==== Section 4 ====
First round
7	(South Africa) K Curren (South Africa) T Hanford	6	3	10
(Switzerland) C Dowdeswell (Switzerland) C Jolissaint	1	6	8
(Switzerland) M Günthardt (Switzerland) I Villiger	6	6	5
Q	(Australia) D Collings (Australia) K Gulley	4	7	7
Q	(United States) S Simon (United States) L Antonoplis	0	4
(Switzerland) H Günthardt (United States) P Teeguarden	6	6
(United Kingdom) A Jarrett (United Kingdom) D Jevans	7	5	5
2	(South Africa) F McMillan (Netherlands) B Stöve	5	7	7

Second round
7	(South Africa) K Curren (South Africa) T Harford	5	6	6
(United States) J DiLouie (France) C Vanier	7	0	2
(Australia) D Collings (Australia) K Gulley	6	3	7
(United Kingdom) J Dier (United Kingdom) A Cooper	4	6	5
(Switzerland) H Günthardt (United States) P Teeguarden	6	6
(United States) S Davis (United States) S Mascarin	2	1
(United States) R Meyer (United States) E Nagelsen	4	5
2	(South Africa) F McMillan (Netherlands) B Stöve	6	7

Third round
7	(South Africa) K Curren (South Africa) T Harford	6	6
Q	(Australia) D Collings (Australia) K Gulley	1	4
(Switzerland) H Günthardt (United States) P Teeguarden	1	6	3
2	(South Africa) F McMillan (Netherlands) B Stöve	6	3	6

Quarterfinals
7	(South Africa) K Curren (South Africa) T Harford	7	5	1
2	(South Africa) F McMillan (Netherlands) B Stöve	6	7	6
