= 1981 Stockholm Open – Doubles =

Men's tennis tournament

Doubles
- 1981 Stockholm Open

Final
- Champions: (South Africa) Kevin Curren (United States) Steve Denton
- Runners-up: (United States) Sherwood Stewart (United States) Ferdi Taygan
- Score: 6–7, 6–4, 6–0

Details
- Draw: 32
- Seeds: 8

Events
| Singles | Doubles |
- Stockholm Open

Heinz Günthardt and Paul McNamee were the defending champions, but McNamee did not participate this year. Günthardt partnered Balázs Taróczy, losing in the first round.

Kevin Curren and Steve Denton won the title, defeating Sherwood Stewart and Ferdi Taygan 6–7, 6–4, 6–0 in the final.

== Seeds ==
1. (Switzerland) Heinz Günthardt / (Hungary) Balázs Taróczy (first round)
2. N/A
3. (United States) Sherwood Stewart / (United States) Ferdi Taygan (final)
4. (South Africa) Kevin Curren / (United States) Steve Denton (champions)
5. (United States) Victor Amaya / (United States) Hank Pfister (first round)
6. (United States) Sandy Mayer / (South Africa) Frew McMillan (quarterfinals)
7. (United States) Brian Gottfried / (United States) Robert Lutz (quarterfinals)
8. (United States) Tom Gullikson / (United States) Peter Rennert (semifinals)

== Draw ==
Key

- Q = Qualifier
- WC = Wild card
- LL = Lucky loser
- Alt = Alternate
- ITF = ITF entry
- PR = Protected ranking
- SR = Special ranking
- SE = Special exempt
- JE = Junior exempt
- JR = Junior Accelerator Programme entrant
- CO = College Accelerator Programme entrant
- NG = Next Gen Accelerator Program entrant
- w/o = Walkover
- r = Retired
- d = Defaulted

=== Finals ===
Semifinals
(Sweden) Anders Järryd (Sweden) Hans Simonsson | 3 | 4
3 | (United States) Sherwood Stewart (United States) Ferdi Taygan | 6 | 6
4 | (South Africa) Kevin Curren (United States) Steve Denton | 7 | 7
8 | (United States) Tom Gullikson (United States) Peter Rennert | 6 | 6

Final
3 | (United States) Sherwood Stewart (United States) Ferdi Taygan | 7 | 4 | 0
4 | (South Africa) Kevin Curren (United States) Steve Denton | 6 | 6 | 6

=== Top half ===
First round
1 | (Switzerland) H Günthardt (Hungary) B Taróczy | 5 | 6
(Brazil) C Kirmayr (Brazil) J Soares | 7 | 7
(Sweden) A Järryd (Sweden) H Simonsson | 6 | 6
(India) A Amritraj (United States) F McNair | 3 | 3
(Sweden) J Norbäck (France) C Roger-Vasselin | 5 | 6 | 7
(United States) J Hayes (United States) S Meister | 7 | 3 | 5
(United States) G Holroyd (United States) W Redondo | 2 | 7 | 4
7 | (United States) B Gottfried (United States) R Lutz | 6 | 6 | 6
3 | (United States) S Stewart (United States) F Taygan | 6 | 7
(West Germany) P Elter (Sweden) S Simonsson | 2 | 5
(South Africa) E Edwards (Finland) L Palin | 7 | 2 | 7
(South Africa) J Kriek (France) G Moretton | 6 | 6 | 6
(United States) T Giammalva (United States) S Giammalva Jr. | 7 | 1 | 6
(United States) N Saviano (New Zealand) R Simpson | 5 | 6 | 3
(United States) T Mayotte (United States) T Wilkinson | 3 | 7 | 6
5 | (United States) V Amaya (United States) H Pfister | 6 | 6 | 2

Second round
(Brazil) C Kirmayr (Brazil) J Soares | 4 | 1
(Sweden) A Järryd (Sweden) H Simonsson | 6 | 6
(Sweden) J Norbäck (France) C Roger-Vasselin | 0 | 2
7 | (United States) B Gottfried (United States) R Lutz | 6 | 6
3 | (United States) S Stewart (United States) F Taygan | 7 | 6
(South Africa) E Edwards (Finland) L Palin | 6 | 1
(United States) S Giammalva Jr. (United States) T Giammalva | 6 | 6
(United States) T Mayotte (United States) T Wilkinson | 2 | 4

Quarterfinals
(Sweden) A Järryd (Sweden) H Simonsson | 6 | 4 | 6
7 | (United States) B Gottfried (United States) R Lutz | 3 | 6 | 4
3 | (United States) S Stewart (United States) F Taygan | 6 | 6
(United States) S Giammalva Jr. (United States) T Giammalva | 4 | 3

Semifinals
(Sweden) A Järryd (Sweden) H Simonsson | 3 | 4
3 | (United States) S Stewart (United States) F Taygan | 6 | 6

=== Bottom half ===
First round
6 | (United States) S Mayer (South Africa) F McMillan | 6 | 7
(Netherlands) T Okker (Czechoslovakia) T Šmíd | 2 | 5
(United States) J Borowiak (United States) D Siegler | 6 | 7
(United States) E Fromm (United States) C Leeds | 4 | 6
(Czechoslovakia) S Birner (Czechoslovakia) J Granát | 6 | 6
(Sweden) J Gunnarsson (Sweden) S Svensson | 3 | 3
(South Africa) R Chappell (South Africa) D Joubert | 1 | 0
4 | (South Africa) K Curren (United States) S Denton | 6 | 6
8 | (United States) T Gullikson (United States) P Rennert | 6 | 7
(West Germany) R Gehring (Spain) Á Giménez | 4 | 6
(Sweden) M Tideman (Sweden) J Windahl
(Sweden) J Nyström (Sweden) M Wilander
(Israel) S Glickstein (Sweden) P Hjertquist | 7 | 6
(Romania) I Năstase (France) T Tulasne | 6 | 2
(United States) T Delatte (United States) T Waltke | 2 | 0
LL | (Republic of Ireland) M Doyle (United States) B Testerman | 6 | 6

Second round
6 | (United States) S Mayer (South Africa) F McMillan | 6 | 6
(United States) J Borowiak (United States) D Siegler | 3 | 4
(Czechoslovakia) S Birner (Czechoslovakia) J Granát | 4 | 4
4 | (South Africa) K Curren (United States) S Denton | 6 | 6
8 | (United States) T Gullikson (United States) P Rennert | 7 | 6
(Sweden) M Tideman (Sweden) J Windahl | 6 | 4
(Israel) S Glickstein (Sweden) P Hjertquist | 2 | 3
LL | (Republic of Ireland) M Doyle (United States) B Testerman | 6 | 6

Quarterfinals
6 | (United States) S Mayer (South Africa) F McMillan | 4 | 6
4 | (South Africa) K Curren (United States) S Denton | 6 | 7
8 | (United States) T Gullikson (United States) P Rennert | 6 | 4 | 6
LL | (Republic of Ireland) M Doyle (United States) B Testerman | 3 | 7 | 4

Semifinals
4 | (South Africa) K Curren (United States) S Denton | 7 | 7
8 | (United States) T Gullikson (United States) P Rennert | 6 | 6
