= 1981 Wimbledon Championships – Men's doubles =

Men's doubles
- 1981 Wimbledon Championships

Final
- Champions: (United States) Peter Fleming (United States) John McEnroe
- Runners-up: (United States) Bob Lutz (United States) Stan Smith
- Score: 6–4, 6–4, 6–4

Details
- Draw: 64 (5 Q / 4 WC )
- Seeds: 16

Events
Singles	men	women		boys	girls
Doubles	men	women	mixed	boys	girls
← 1980 ·	Wimbledon Championships	· 1982 →

Peter Fleming and John McEnroe defeated Bob Lutz and Stan Smith in the final, 6–4, 6–4, 6–4 to win the gentlemen's doubles title at the 1981 Wimbledon Championships. It was the pair's second Wimbledon men's doubles title. McEnroe also won the singles event for the first time that year.

Peter McNamara and Paul McNamee were the defending champions, but were defeated in the semifinals by Lutz and Smith.

== Seeds ==
1. (United States) Peter Fleming / (United States) John McEnroe (champions)
2. (Australia) Peter McNamara / (Australia) Paul McNamee (semifinals)
3. (United States) Bob Lutz / (United States) Stan Smith (final)
4. n/a
5. (Switzerland) Heinz Günthardt / (Hungary) Balázs Taróczy (third round)
6. (United States) Marty Riessen / (United States) Sherwood Stewart (second round)
7. (United States) Bruce Manson / (United States) Brian Teacher (first round)
8. (United States) Brian Gottfried / (Mexico) Raúl Ramírez (third round)
9. (South Africa) Kevin Curren / (United States) Steve Denton (second round)
10. n/a
11. (United States) Tim Gullikson / (South Africa) Bernard Mitton (second round)
12. (United States) Fritz Buehning / (United States) Ferdi Taygan (quarterfinals)
13. (Czechoslovakia) Pavel Složil / (Czechoslovakia) Tomáš Šmíd (second round)
14. (United States) Andrew Pattison / (United States) Butch Walts (first round)
15. (United States) Craig Edwards / (South Africa) Eddie Edwards (first round)
16. (South Africa) Frew McMillan / (United Kingdom) Buster Mottram (third round)

Click on the seed number of a player to go to their draw section.

== Draw ==
=== Key ===
- Q = Qualifier
- WC = Wild card
- LL = Lucky loser
- Alt = Alternate
- ITF = ITF entry
- PR = Protected ranking
- SR = Special ranking
- SE = Special exempt
- JE = Junior exempt
- JR = Junior Accelerator Programme entrant
- CO = College Accelerator Programme entrant
- NG = Next Gen Accelerator Program entrant
- w/o = Walkover
- r = Retired
- d = Defaulted

=== Finals ===
Quarterfinals
1	(United States) Peter Fleming (United States) John McEnroe	4	6	6	6
(India) Anand Amritraj (India) Vijay Amritraj	6	2	1	4
(Netherlands) Tom Okker (United States) Dick Stockton	7	7	4	7
(Egypt) Ismail El Shafei (United Kingdom) John Feaver	6	6	6	6
(Australia) Rod Frawley (New Zealand) Chris Lewis	5	3	2
3	(United States) Bob Lutz (United States) Stan Smith	7	6	6
12	(United States) Fritz Buehning (United States) Ferdi Taygan	3	5	6	5
2	(Australia) Peter McNamara (Australia) Paul McNamee	6	7	3	7

Semifinals
1	(United States) Peter Fleming (United States) John McEnroe	6	6	6
(Netherlands) Tom Okker (United States) Dick Stockton	3	2	4
3	(United States) Bob Lutz (United States) Stan Smith	6	2	4	7	6
2	(Australia) Paul McNamee (Australia) Peter McNamara	4	6	6	6	4

Final
1	(United States) Peter Fleming (United States) John McEnroe	6	6	6
3	(United States) Bob Lutz (United States) Stan Smith	4	4	4

=== Top half ===
==== Section 1 ====
First round
1	(United States) P Fleming (United States) J McEnroe	6	6	3	6
LL	(United States) C Aguilar (United States) J Edwards	1	2	6	3
(Australia) E Ewert (Australia) C Johnstone	7	4	6	2
(South Africa) R Moore (United States) E van Dillen	6	6	7	6
(United States) S Krulevitz (United States) R Meyer	6	7	5	6
(Australia) R Case (Chile) J Fillol	4	6	7	3
(Australia) J Fitzgerald (Australia) W Pascoe	6	7	4	6
LL	(United Kingdom) M Appleton (Australia) D Collings	4	6	6	1
16	(South Africa) F McMillan (United Kingdom) C Mottram	7	6	6
(Czechoslovakia) J Kodeš (New Zealand) O Parun	5	2	3
(France) C Roger-Vasselin (France) T Tulasne	7	6	6
WC	(United Kingdom) R Beven (United Kingdom) J Dier	6	1	4
Q	(United States) M Anger (United States) S Davis	3	3	2
(India) A Amritraj (India) V Amritraj	6	6	6
WC	(United Kingdom) A Lloyd (United Kingdom) J Lloyd	7	3	3	6
6	(United States) M Riessen (United States) S Stewart	6	6	6	7

Second round
1	(United States) P Fleming (United States) J McEnroe	7	4	6	6
(South Africa) R Moore (United States) E van Dillen	6	6	3	4
(United States) S Krulevitz (United States) R Meyer	4	6	4	6
(Australia) J Fitzgerald (Australia) W Pascoe	6	4	6	7
16	(South Africa) F McMillan (United Kingdom) C Mottram	6	6	6
(France) C Roger-Vasselin (France) T Tulasne	3	3	3
(India) A Amritraj (India) V Amritraj	6	7	7
6	(United States) M Riessen (United States) S Stewart	1	6	6

Third round
1	(United States) P Fleming (United States) J McEnroe	6	6	6
(Australia) J Fitzgerald (Australia) W Pascoe	4	2	2
16	(South Africa) F McMillan (United Kingdom) C Mottram	3	7	7	1	2
(India) A Amritraj (India) V Amritraj	6	6	5	6	6

Quarterfinals
1	(United States) P Fleming (United States) J McEnroe	4	6	6	6
(India) A Amritraj (India) V Amritraj	6	2	1	4

==== Section 2 ====
First round
LL	(United Kingdom) R Booth (Sweden) J Windahl	3	6	6	6	0
LL	(United States) S McCain (United States) S Meister	6	7	2	4	6
(United States) M Davis (United States) C Dunk	7	6	6	7
Q	(Australia) C Fancutt (Australia) M Fancutt	6	4	7	6
LL	(South Africa) B Moir (South Africa) M Robertson	7	3	3	6
(Netherlands) T Okker (United States) R Stockton	6	6	6	7
(Australia) B Drewett (United States) L Stefanki	6	3	4
11	(United States) T Gullikson (South Africa) B Mitton	7	6	6
13	(Czechoslovakia) P Složil (Czechoslovakia) T Šmíd	6	6	6
(United States) E Fromm (United States) C Leeds	2	3	2
(India) S Menon (United States) W Scanlon	3	6	6	4
(Egypt) I El Shafei (United Kingdom) J Feaver	6	3	7	6
(Argentina) JL Clerc (Romania) I Năstase	6	6	5	6
(United States) I Harris (United States) C Wittus	4	4	7	4
(Australia) D Carter (Australia) P Kronk	3	6	4	3
8	(United States) B Gottfried (Mexico) R Ramírez	6	3	6	6

Second round
LL	(United States) S McCain (United States) S Meister	1	5	6
(United States) M Davis (United States) C Dunk	6	7	7
(Netherlands) T Okker (United States) R Stockton	3	2	6	7	6
11	(United States) T Gullikson (South Africa) B Mitton	6	6	4	6	2
13	(Czechoslovakia) P Složil (Czechoslovakia) T Šmíd	4	3	6
(Egypt) I El Shafei (United Kingdom) J Feaver	6	6	7
(Argentina) JL Clerc (Romania) I Năstase	w/o
8	(United States) B Gottfried (Mexico) R Ramírez

Third round
(United States) M Davis (United States) C Dunk	3	5	5
(Netherlands) T Okker (United States) R Stockton	6	7	7
(Egypt) I El Shafei (United Kingdom) J Feaver	7	7	6
8	(United States) B Gottfried (Mexico) R Ramírez	6	6	3

Quarterfinals
(Netherlands) T Okker (United States) R Stockton	7	7	4	7
(Egypt) I El Shafei (United Kingdom) J Feaver	6	6	6	6

=== Bottom half ===
==== Section 3 ====
First round
7	(United States) B Manson (United States) B Teacher	6	5	6
(West Germany) U Marten (West Germany) W Popp	7	7	7
(Argentina) R Carruthers (Peru) F Maynetto	4	6	6	2	6
(United States) M Purcell (United States) P Rennert	6	3	4	6	3
WC	(Australia) J Newcombe (Australia) A Roche	4	7	6	6	4
(Australia) R Frawley (New Zealand) C Lewis	6	6	7	1	6
Q	(United States) T Graham (United States) B Nichols	6	6	6	4	6
15	(United States) C Edwards (South Africa) E Edwards	2	7	3	6	4
14	(United States) A Pattison (United States) K Walts	6	6	6	7	1
Q	(South Africa) R Chappell (South Africa) S van der Merwe	7	7	4	5	6
(France) Y Noah (France) P Portes	w/o
(United States) G Holroyd (United States) W Redondo
(United States) C Skakle (South Africa) J Yuill	7	4
Q	(South Africa) C Viljoen (South Africa) D Visser	6	5^{r}
(West Germany) K Eberhard (West Germany) H Kirchhübel	3	2	2
3	(United States) R Lutz (United States) S Smith	6	6	6

Second round
(West Germany) U Marten (West Germany) W Popp	6	6	3
(Argentina) R Carruthers (Peru) F Maynetto	7	7	6
(Australia) R Frawley (New Zealand) C Lewis	3	7	7	6
Q	(United States) T Graham (United States) B Nichols	6	6	5	4
Q	(South Africa) R Chappell (South Africa) S van der Merwe	4	6	4
(United States) G Holroyd (United States) W Redondo	6	7	6
(United States) C Skakle (South Africa) J Yuill	4	4	3
3	(United States) R Lutz (United States) S Smith	6	6	6

Third round
(Argentina) R Carruthers (Peru) F Maynetto	2	4	4
(Australia) R Frawley (New Zealand) C Lewis	6	6	6
(United States) G Holroyd (United States) W Redondo	4	7	6	6	1
3	(United States) R Lutz (United States) S Smith	6	5	7	4	6

Quarterfinals
(Australia) R Frawley (New Zealand) C Lewis	5	3	2
3	(United States) R Lutz (United States) S Smith	7	6	6

==== Section 4 ====
First round
5	(Switzerland) H Günthardt (Hungary) B Taróczy	7	5	6	7
(Brazil) C Kirmayr (Brazil) C Motta	6	7	3	6
(United States) T Delatte (Australia) M Edmondson	7	0	6	6
(Australia) J Alexander (Australia) P Dent	5	6	2	4
(United States) J Austin (United States) F McNair	6	7	7
(Paraguay) F González (Paraguay) V Pecci	3	5	6
(United States) M Estep (Sweden) J Gunnarsson	5	6	4
12	(United States) F Buehning (United States) F Taygan	7	7	6
9	(South Africa) K Curren (United States) S Denton	6	6	3	7
(Switzerland) M Günthardt (Philippines) B Sison	3	4	6	6
(United States) W Martin (New Zealand) R Simpson	6	6	6	6
WC	(United Kingdom) R Drysdale (United Kingdom) R Lewis	3	4	7	1
(Australia) B Guan (Australia) W Hampson	6	6	6
(United States) J Sadri (United States) T Wilkison	4	2	3
(Australia) S Ball (Australia) C Letcher	2	4	4
2	(Australia) P McNamara (Australia) P McNamee	6	6	6

Second round
5	(Switzerland) H Günthardt (Hungary) B Taróczy	6	6	3	7
(United States) T Delatte (Australia) M Edmondson	4	4	6	6
(United States) J Austin (United States) F McNair	6	4	4	5
12	(United States) F Buehning (United States) F Taygan	4	6	6	7
9	(South Africa) K Curren (United States) S Denton	6	6	4	4
(United States) W Martin (New Zealand) R Simpson	4	7	6	6
(Australia) B Guan (Australia) W Hampson	3	3	3
2	(Australia) P McNamara (Australia) P McNamee	6	6	6

Third round
5	(Switzerland) H Günthardt (Hungary) B Taróczy	4	7	6	6	6
12	(United States) F Buehning (United States) F Taygan	6	6	7	3	8
(United States) W Martin (New Zealand) R Simpson	6	6	6	1	4
2	(Australia) P McNamara (Australia) P McNamee	7	4	4	6	6

Quarterfinals
12	(United States) F Buehning (United States) F Taygan	3	5	6	5
2	(Australia) P McNamara (Australia) P McNamee	6	7	3	7
