= 1981 Stockholm Open – Singles =

Singles
- 1981 Stockholm Open

Final
- Champion: (United States) Gene Mayer
- Runner-up: (United States) Sandy Mayer
- Score: 6–4, 6–2

Details
- Draw: 64
- Seeds: 16

Events
Singles	Doubles
- Stockholm Open

Björn Borg was the defending champion, but did not participate this year.

Gene Mayer won the title, defeating Sandy Mayer 6–4, 6–2 in the final.

== Seeds ==
1. (United States) Jimmy Connors (semifinals)
2. (United States) Roscoe Tanner (second round, withdrew)
3. (United States) Gene Mayer (champion)
4. (France) Yannick Noah (third round)
5. (United States) Brian Gottfried (second round)
6. (South Africa) Johan Kriek (second round)
7. (United States) Harold Solomon (first round)
8. (United States) Stan Smith (second round)
9. (Czechoslovakia) Tomáš Šmíd (second round)
10. (United States) Fritz Buehning (third round, withdrew)
11. (United States) Sandy Mayer (final)
12. (West Germany) Rolf Gehring (second round)
13. (United States) Tim Mayotte (third round)
14. (United States) Robert Lutz (second round)
15. (South Africa) Kevin Curren (second round)
16. (Brazil) Carlos Kirmayr (second round)

== Draw ==
Key

- Q = Qualifier
- WC = Wild card
- LL = Lucky loser
- Alt = Alternate
- ITF = ITF entry
- PR = Protected ranking
- SR = Special ranking
- SE = Special exempt
- JE = Junior exempt
- JR = Junior Accelerator Programme entrant
- CO = College Accelerator Programme entrant
- NG = Next Gen Accelerator Program entrant
- w/o = Walkover
- r = Retired
- d = Defaulted

=== Finals ===
Semifinals
1	(United States) Jimmy Connors	3	3
11	(United States) Sandy Mayer	6	6
3	(United States) Gene Mayer	6	6
(United States) Hank Pfister	3	2

Final
11	(United States) Sandy Mayer	4	2
3	(United States) Gene Mayer	6	6

=== Top half ===
==== Section 1 ====
First round
1	(United States) J Connors	6	6
(United States) J Borowiak	0	2
(Czechoslovakia) J Granát	6	4	7
(United States) E Fromm	4	6	6
(Israel) S Glickstein	6	1	6
(Brazil) J Soares	3	6	3
(United States) F Taygan	4	4
9	(Czechoslovakia) T Šmíd	6	6
14	(United States) R Lutz	6	7
(New Zealand) J Simpson	3	6
(United States) B Testerman	6	5	2
(United States) N Saviano	0	7	6
(France) G Moretton	6	7
(United States) V Amaya	3	6
(Romania) I Năstase	6	6
7	(United States) H Solomon	4	3

Second round
1	(United States) J Connors	6	6
(Czechoslovakia) J Granát	2	1
(Israel) S Glickstein	7	6
9	(Czechoslovakia) T Šmíd	6	4
14	(United States) R Lutz	3	4
(United States) N Saviano	6	6
(France) G Moretton	6	4	1
(Romania) I Năstase	1	6	6

Third round
1	(United States) J Connors	6	7	6
(Israel) S Glickstein	7	5	1
(United States) N Saviano	7	6
(Romania) I Năstase	5	2

Quarterfinals
1	(United States) J Connors	6	6
(United States) N Saviano	3	4

==== Section 2 ====
First round
4	(France) Y Noah	2	6	6
(Sweden) H Sundström	6	2	3
(Sweden) J Nyström	4	6	6
(Sweden) J Norbäck	6	3	2
(United States) S Meister	4	1
(Sweden) J Gunnarsson	6	6
(United States) T Waltke	3	1
11	(United States) S Mayer	6	6
16	(Brazil) C Kirmayr	4	6	7
(Sweden) T Högstedt	6	4	5
(West Germany) H-D Beutel	6	6
(France) C Roger-Vasselin	2	3
(Sweden) S Svensson	2	6
(West Germany) P Elter	6	7
(France) P Portes	4	5
6	(South Africa) J Kriek	6	7

Second round
4	(France) Y Noah	6	4	6
(Sweden) J Nyström	2	6	4
(Sweden) J Gunnarsson	6	3	3
11	(United States) S Mayer	4	6	6
16	(Brazil) C Kirmayr	4	4
(West Germany) H-D Beutel	6	6
(West Germany) P Elter	7	6
6	(South Africa) J Kriek	6	2

Third round
4	(France) Y Noah	2	2
11	(United States) S Mayer	6	6
(West Germany) H-D Beutel	3	4
(West Germany) P Elter	6	6

Quarterfinals
11	(United States) S Mayer	6	3	6
(West Germany) P Elter	2	6	1

=== Bottom half ===
==== Section 3 ====
First round
8	(United States) S Smith	6	6
(United States) P Rennert	3	4
(Czechoslovakia) S Birner	6	1	3
(Sweden) M Wilander	4	6	6
(United States) T Giammalva	6	6
(United States) R Meyer	3	2
(United States) C Leeds	5	4
13	(United States) T Mayotte	7	6
10	(United States) F Buehning	6	6
(United States) T Wilkison	2	3
(Sweden) S Simonsson	5	6	1
(United States) S Giammalva Jr.	7	1	6
(France) T Tulasne	4	3
(Sweden) A Järryd	6	6
(United States) P Fleming	4	1
3	(United States) G Mayer	6	6

Second round
8	(United States) S Smith	6	2
(Sweden) M Wilander	7	6
(United States) T Giammalva	3	1
13	(United States) T Mayotte	6	6
10	(United States) F Buehning	7	6
(United States) S Giammalva Jr.	6	4
(Sweden) A Järryd	1	2
3	(United States) G Mayer	6	6

Third round
(Sweden) M Wilander	6	6
13	(United States) T Mayotte	4	2
10	(United States) F Buehning
3	(United States) G Mayer	w/o

Quarterfinals
(Sweden) M Wilander	2	3
3	(United States) G Mayer	6	6

==== Section 4 ====
First round
5	(United States) B Gottfried	6	6
(United States) D Siegler	1	2
(Sweden) P Hjertquist	3	4
(United States) H Pfister	6	6
(Netherlands) T Okker	3	2
(United States) T Gullikson	6	6
(Sweden) H Simonsson	6	2
12	(West Germany) R Gehring	7	6
15	(South Africa) K Curren	6	6
(South Africa) E Edwards	3	1
(Republic of Ireland) M Doyle	6	6
(United States) J Hayes	3	1
(United States) S Denton	7	6
(Spain) Á Giménez	5	4
(West Germany) K Eberhard	3	3
2	(United States) R Tanner	6	6

Second round
5	(United States) B Gottfried	3	6	2
(United States) H Pfister	6	1	6
(United States) T Gullikson	4	6	6
12	(West Germany) R Gehring	6	4	3
15	(South Africa) K Curren	2	3
(Republic of Ireland) M Doyle	6	6
(United States) S Denton	w/o
2	(United States) R Tanner

Third round
(United States) H Pfister	5	7	6
(United States) T Gullikson	7	6	4
(Republic of Ireland) M Doyle	6	6
(United States) S Denton	4	3

Quarterfinals
(United States) H Pfister	6	6
(Republic of Ireland) M Doyle	4	3
