= Polish International Tennis Championships =

Defunct tennis tournament
- Tour: ILTF World Circuit
- Founded: 1931; 95 years ago
- Abolished: 1985; 41 years ago
- Editions: 45
- Location: Warsaw (1931–1935); Bydgoszcz (1936–1937); Gdynia (1939); Sopot (1946, 1949); Katowice (1947–1948, 1958–1985)
- Venue: Various
- Surface: Clay / outdoor

The Polish International Tennis Championships was a men's and women's clay court international tennis tournament founded in 1931. It first was played at the Legia Courts, Warsaw, Poland and staged annually at various locations until 1985 when it was discontinued.

== History ==
The tournament was founded in 1931 and was played on outdoor clay courts at the Legia Courts, Warsaw, Poland where it remained until 1935. The inaugural winners of the men's and women's singles event were France's Benny Berthet and Polands Jadwiga Jędrzejowska. In 1936 the event was moved to the BKS Courts in Bydgoszcz. It continued to be held in different locations until 1985 when it was discontinued.

Previous winners of the men's singles have included Pat Hughes, Józef Hebda, Ignacy Tłoczyński, Władysław Skonecki, Jiri Javorsky, Jan-Erik Lundqvist, Gérard Pilet, Istvan Gulyas, Ion Țiriac, Alex Metreveli and Thomas Emmrich. Former winners of the women's singles included Odile de Roubin.

== Finals ==
=== Men's singles ===
Year	Champion	Runner-up	Score
1931	(France) Benny Berthet	(Poland) Ignacy Tłoczyński	4-6, 6-3, 6-4, 9-11, 9-7
1932	(Poland) Józef Hebda	(Poland) Ignacy Tłoczyński	6-4, 6-3, 4-6, 6-4
1933	(Czechoslovakia) Ladislav Hecht	(Austria) Franz Matejka	
1934	(Poland) Ignacy Tłoczyński	(Poland) Józef Hebda	6-2, 7-9, 6-4, 6-2
1935	(United Kingdom) Pat Hughes	(Poland) Kazimierz Tarlowski	9-7, 4-6, 3-6, 6-4, 6-1
1936	(Poland) Kazimierz Tarlowski	(Poland) Józef Hebda	6-1, 6-0, 6-2
1937	(Poland) Józef Hebda	(Poland) Ignacy Tłoczyński	6-3, 6-2 rtd.
1939	(Poland) Józef Hebda	(Poland) Ignacy Tłoczyński	6-2, 1-6, 9-7, 6-3
1940-45	No competition		
1946	(Poland) Władysław Skonecki	(Poland) Józef Hebda	6-4, 1-6, 7-9, 6-4, 6-1
1947	(Hungary) Ottó Szigeti	(Czechoslovakia) Jan Smolinsky	6-4, 1-6, 9-7, 6-2
1948	(Poland) Władysław Skonecki	(Czechoslovakia) Vladimír Zábrodský	6-3, 6-3, 6-1
1949	(Poland) Władysław Skonecki	(Czechoslovakia) Jan Krajcik	6-0, 8-6, 7-5
1950	(Poland) Władysław Skonecki	(Hungary) József Asbóth	6-4, 6-4, 0-6, 6-0
1952	(Czechoslovakia) Jiří Javorský	(Czechoslovakia) Jan Krajcik	5-7, 6-0, 6-3, 6-3
1954	(Czechoslovakia) Jiří Javorský	(Hungary) Antal Jancsó	7-5, 6-3, 3-6, 6-4
1955	(Czechoslovakia) Jiří Javorský	(Hungary) Istvan Gulyas	6-4, 6-0, 6-0
1956	(Poland) Andrzej Licis	(Poland) Władysław Skonecki	6-0, 6-1, 2-6, 3-6, 6-2
1957	(Poland) Andrzej Licis	(Poland) Władysław Skonecki	7-5, 6-4, 7-5
1958	(Sweden) Jan-Erik Lundqvist	(Czechoslovakia) Jiří Javorský	6-3, 7-5, 1-6, 6-3
1959	(France) Gérard Pilet	(Soviet Union) Sergei Andreev	6-3, 6-1, 6-2
1960	(Czechoslovakia) Jiří Javorský	(Poland) Władysław Skonecki	6-1, 6-1, 6-4
1961	(Hungary) István Gulyás	(Czechoslovakia) Jiří Javorský	6-3, 1-6, 6-4, 6-2
1962	(Hungary) István Gulyás	(South Africa) Keith Diepraam	6-3, 6-2, 6-1
1963	(Romania) Ion Țiriac	(Poland) Wiesław Gąsiorek	6-3, 9-7, 4-6, 6-4
1964	(Hungary) István Gulyás	(Poland) Wiesław Gąsiorek	4-6, 6-2, 2-6, 6-1, 6-0
1965	(Hungary) István Gulyás	(United States) Allen Fox	3-6, 10-8, 3-6, 10-8, 6-3
1966	(Poland) Wiesław Gąsiorek	(Hungary) Péter Szőke	6-0, 6-4, 6-2
1967	(Poland) Wiesław Gąsiorek	(Poland) Mieczyslaw Rybarczyk	6-4, 6-2, 6-3
1968	(Poland) Wiesław Gąsiorek	(Soviet Union) Sergei Likhachev	
1969	(Soviet Union) Toomas Leius	(Poland) Wiesław Gąsiorek	6-0, 4-6, 7-5, 6-2
1970	(Poland) Tadeusz Nowicki	(Soviet Union) Khendrick Sepp	6-1, 6-3, 6-1
1971	(Soviet Union) Alex Metreveli	(Soviet Union) Toomas Leius	6-3, 6-2, 6-3
1972	(Czechoslovakia) Jan Pisecky	(Poland) Wiesław Gąsiorek	2-6, 1-6, 8-6, 6-2, 11-9
1973	(Poland) Tadeusz Nowicki	(Soviet Union) Vyacheslav Egorov	6-2, 6-1, 6-1
1974	(Hungary) Géza Varga	(Poland) Tadeusz Nowicki	10-8, 6-4
1975	(Poland) Tadeusz Nowicki	(Hungary) János Benyik	0-6, 6-3, 6-1, 6-4
1976	(Czechoslovakia) Pavel Sevcik	(Czechoslovakia) Pavel Složil	w/o
1977	(Poland) Tadeusz Nowicki	(Poland) Henryk Drzymalski	6-4, 7-5, 3-0 rtd.
1978	(West Germany) Thomas Emmrich	(Soviet Union) Vadim Borisov	4-6, 6-7, 6-4, 7-5, 6-2
1979	(Soviet Union) Vadim Borisov	(Poland) Tadeusz Nowocki	6-4, 7-5, 6-4
1980	(Poland) Henryk Drzymalski	(Poland) Ilia Gruzman	6-0, 6-3, 4-6, 6-4
1981	(Poland) Henryk Drzymalski	(Czechoslovakia) Frantisek Polyak	7-6, 6-2
1982	(West Germany) Thomas Emmrich	(Poland) Henryk Drzymalski	6-4, 5-7, 2-6, 7-6, 6-0
1983	(West Germany) Thomas Emmrich	(Poland) Waldemar Rogowski	6-1, 6-2, 3-6, 6-2
1984	(Soviet Union) Alexander Zverev Sr.	(Soviet Union) Vadim Borisov	6-2, 7-6, 6-3
1985	(West Germany) Thomas Emmrich	(Poland) Lech Bienkowski	6-1, 6-3, 6-2
