= Sofia Open =

Sofia Open may refer to:

- ATP Sofia Open, an ATP 250 Series tennis tournament started in 2016.
- Sofia Open (1980–81), a defunct Grand Prix tennis event played from 1980 to 1981.
- Vitosha New Otani Open, a defunct WTA Tour event from 1988 to 1989.
