= Andrea Buchanan =

American tennis player (1955–1982)

- Full name: Andrea Buchanan (nee Whitmore)
- Country (sports): United States
- Born: April 6, 1955 Los Angeles, California
- Died: January 28, 1982 (aged 26) Culver City, California
- Plays: 5 ft 6 in

Grand Slam singles results
- French Open: 2R (1981)
- Wimbledon: 3R (1981)
- US Open: 2R (1979, 1981)

Grand Slam doubles results
- French Open: 1R (1979, 1981)
- Wimbledon: 3R (1979, 1980, 1981)
- US Open: 2R (1981)

Grand Slam mixed doubles results
- French Open: 1R (1981)
- US Open: 1R (1979, 1980)

Andrea Buchanan (April 6, 1955 – January 28, 1982) was an American professional tennis player.

== Biography ==
Born in Los Angeles, Buchanan went to Dorsey High School and turned professional in 1978. She was one of only several African American players competing on tour. Her best grand slam performances came at the 1981 Wimbledon Championships, where she beat Barbara Hallquist before falling in the third round to second-seed Hana Mandlíková. In what would be her last grand slam appearance she won a first round match against Eva Pfaff at 1981 US Open.

=== Murder ===
On the morning of January 28, 1982, Buchanan was found mortally wounded on the floor of a Los Angeles fish market, where she was working part time as a cashier. She was rushed to Brotman Memorial Hospital in Culver City with multiple bullet wounds to her upper body, but never regained consciousness. Her boss, 57-year old Nathanial Brown, was pronounced dead at the scene. The case remains unsolved. Police ruled out robbery as a motive and believe that, unknown to Buchanan, Brown had been involved with dealing illicit substances.

Buchanan was a popular player on tour and her death was widely mourned. Billie Jean King, one of her close friends, had to retire during her first round match at the 1982 Avon Championships of Detroit as she was unable to concentrate.

== See also ==
- List of unsolved murders (1980–1999)
