= Hartmut Kirchhübel =

German tennis player

- Full name: Hartmut Kirchhübel
- Country (sports): West Germany
- Born: 23 April 1952 (age 74) Waldheim, East Germany
- Plays: Right-handed

Singles
- Career record: 0–8
- Career titles: 0
- Highest ranking: No. 253 (4 January 1982)

Doubles
- Career record: 10–10
- Career titles: 1

Grand Slam doubles results
- Wimbledon: 1R (1981)

Hartmut Kirchhübel (born 23 April 1952) is a former professional tennis player from Germany.

== Biography ==
Born in East Germany, Kirchhübel and his family moved to Hanover when he was seven. After school he studied at a Medical College in Hanover, then worked as a Medizinalassistenten before completing his PhD at Hannover Medical School.

Kirchhübel didn't begin competing in professional tennis until the age of 28. In 1980 he partnered with Robert Reininger to win the Sofia Open, a tournament on the Grand Prix tennis circuit. It was in doubles that he made his only Grand Slam appearance, which was at the 1981 Wimbledon Championships with Klaus Eberhard.

In 1983 he returned to medicine and since 1992 has worked in Wolfratshausen as an orthopedist.

== Grand Prix career finals ==
=== Doubles: 1 (1–0) ===
Result	W/L	Date	Tournament	Surface	Partner	Opponents	Score
Win	1–0	Dec 1980	Sofia, Bulgaria	Carpet	(Austria) Robert Reininger	(Soviet Union) Vadim Borisov (East Germany) Thomas Emmrich	4–6, 6–3, 6–4
