= 1981 Wimbledon Championships – Girls' singles =

Girls' singles
- 1981 Wimbledon Championships

Final
- Champion: (United States) Zina Garrison
- Runner-up: (South Africa) Rene Uys
- Score: 6–4, 3–6, 6–0

Events
Singles	men	women		boys	girls
Doubles	men	women	mixed	boys	girls
← 1980 ·	Wimbledon Championships	· 1982 →

Zina Garrison defeated Rene Uys in the final, 6–4, 3–6, 6–0 to win the girls' singles tennis title at the 1981 Wimbledon Championships.

== Seeds ==
1. (United States) Bonnie Gadusek (third round)
2. (Australia) Elizabeth Sayers (semifinals)
3. (Australia) Anne Minter (quarterfinals)
4. (Czechoslovakia) Helena Suková (second round)
5. (France) Corinne Vanier (third round)
6. (Hungary) Andrea Temesvári (quarterfinals)
7. n/a
8. (United States) Zina Garrison (champion)

Click on the seed number of a player to go to their draw section.

== Draw ==
=== Key ===
- Q = Qualifier
- WC = Wild card
- LL = Lucky loser
- Alt = Alternate
- SE = Special exempt
- PR = Protected ranking
- ITF = ITF entry
- JE = Junior exempt
- w/o = Walkover
- r = Retired
- d = Defaulted
- SR = Special ranking

=== Finals ===
Quarterfinals
(United States) Andrea Leand	6	6
(Japan) Kumiko Okamoto	3	1
3	(Australia) Anne Minter	4	6
(South Africa) Rene Uys	6	7
8	(United States) Zina Garrison	6	6
(Hong Kong) Patricia Hy	1	2
6	(Hungary) Andrea Temesvári	5	4
4	(Australia) Elizabeth Sayers	7	6

Semifinals
(United States) Andrea Leand	2	4
(South Africa) Rene Uys	6	6
8	(United States) Zina Garrison	2	6	6
4	(Australia) Elizabeth Sayers	6	4	2

Final
(South Africa) Rene Uys	4	6	0
8	(United States) Zina Garrison	6	3	6

=== Top half ===
==== Section 1 ====
First round
1	(United States) Bonnie Gadusek	6	6
(Malaysia) S Muhiudeen	0	0
(United States) Andrea Leand	6	6
(Belgium) Anne Gabriel	2	1
(Mexico) Heliane Steden	1	6	3
(Austria) Petra Huber	6	3	6
(New Zealand) Linda Stewart	2	2
(United Kingdom) Annabel Croft	6	6

Second round
1	(United States) B Gadusek	6	6
(Poland) Renata Baranski	0	1
(Denmark) Tine Scheuer-Larsen	1	2
(United States) A Leand	6	6
(Austria) P Huber	6	6
(Argentina) MF Belliotti	2	3
(Japan) Kumiko Okamoto	6	0	7
(United Kingdom) A Croft	1	6	5

Third round
1	(United States) B Gadusek	5	4
(United States) A Leand	7	6
(Austria) P Huber	6	0	4
(Japan) K Okamoto	4	6	6

Quarterfinals
(United States) A Leand	6	6
(Japan) K Okamoto	3	1

==== Section 2 ====
First round
3	(Australia) Anne Minter	6	6
(Bulgaria) Manuela Maleeva	1	4
(Malta) Helen Degiorgio	2	2
(United Kingdom) Amanda Brown	6	6
(Netherlands) Yvette Flu	3	2
(South Africa) Rene Uys	6	6
(France) Marie-Christine Calleja	4	6	1
5	(France) Corinne Vanier	6	3	6

Second round
3	(Australia) A Minter	6	6
(Sweden) Catrin Jexell	3	3
(West Germany) Petra Keppeler	2	4
(United Kingdom) A Brown	6	6
(United States) Kate Gompert	2	4
(South Africa) R Uys	6	6
(Australia) Miranda Yates	5	2
5	(France) C Vanier	7	6

Third round
3	(Australia) A Minter	6	6
(United Kingdom) A Brown	2	0
(South Africa) R Uys	6	6
5	(France) C Vanier	1	1

Quarterfinals
3	(Australia) A Minter	4	6
(South Africa) R Uys	6	7

=== Bottom half ===
==== Section 3 ====
First round
(Japan) Etsuko Inoue	3	6	6
(Finland) H Thoren	6	1	3
(India) N Rankarajan	2	0
(Switzerland) Claudia Pasquale	6	6
(Belgium) Mariane de Wouters	3	4
(Zimbabwe) C Olivier	6	6
(Greece) Angeliki Kanellopoulou	2	1
4	(Czechoslovakia) Helena Suková	6	6

Second round
8	(United States) Zina Garrison	6	6
(Japan) E Inoue	4	0
(Switzerland) C Pasquale	6	6
(United Kingdom) Lisa Pennington	2	3
(Zimbabwe) C Olivier	6	2	7
(United Kingdom) Sara Gomer	4	6	5
(Hong Kong) Patricia Hy	6	4	6
4	(Czechoslovakia) H Suková	4	6	1

Third round
8	(United States) Z Garrison	6	6
(Switzerland) C Pasquale	2	2
(Zimbabwe) C Olivier	0	6
(Hong Kong) P Hy	6	7

Quarterfinals
8	(United States) Z Garrison	6	6
(Hong Kong) P Hy	1	2

==== Section 4 ====
First round
(South Africa) Elvyn Barrable	6	6
(United Kingdom) Elizabeth Jones	3	2
(Canada) Carling Bassett	4	6	3
(France) Sophie Amiach	6	4	6
(Brazil) Silvana Campos	1	4
(Israel) Orly Byalistosky	6	6
(Switzerland) Karin Stampfli	6	6
(Argentina) Andrea Tiezzi	4	4

Second round
6	(Hungary) Andrea Temesvári	2	6	6
(South Africa) E Barrable	6	1	2
(France) S Amiach	6	7
(Israel) Rafeket Binyamini	2	5
(United States) June Ferestien	1	6	6
(Israel) O Byalistosky	6	4	3
(Switzerland) K Stampfli	3	6
4	(Australia) Elizabeth Sayers	6	7

Third round
6	(Hungary) A Temesvári	6	6
(France) S Amiach	1	0
(United States) J Ferestien	0	2
4	(Australia) E Sayers	6	6

Quarterfinals
6	(Hungary) A Temesvári	5	4
4	(Australia) E Sayers	7	6
