= Wayne Pascoe =

Australian tennis player

- Full name: Wayne Pascoe
- Country (sports): Australia
- Born: 19 April 1955 (age 69); Adelaide, Australia
- Plays: Right-handed

Singles
- Career record: 9–17

Grand Slam singles results
- Australian Open: 1R (1981)
- Wimbledon: 2R (1981)

Doubles
- Career record: 11–26

Grand Slam doubles results
- Australian Open: 2R (1980)
- Wimbledon: 3R (1981, 1982)
- US Open: 2R (1982)

Wayne Pascoe (born 19 April 1955) is a former professional tennis player from Australia.

== Biography ==
A right-handed player from Adelaide, Pascoe began competing on tour in the late 1970s.

As a singles player on the Grand Prix circuit he had a win over Bill Scanlon at the Melbourne Indoor in 1980 and had his best run at the 1981 South Australian Open, where he made the quarter-finals in front of a home crowd.

During his career he featured in the main draws of the Australian Open, Wimbledon Championships and US Open. He reached the second round of the 1981 Wimbledon Championships as a qualifier, with a first round win over Pascal Portes. His best performances at Wimbledon came in doubles, twice making the round of 16, with John Fitzgerald in 1981 and David Mustard in 1982.

Pascoe, a property adviser by profession, has served on the board of Tennis NSW since 2011 and was appointed president in 2018.

== Challenger titles ==
=== Doubles: (1) ===
No.	Year	Tournament	Surface	Partner	Opponents	Score
1.	1981	Tokyo, Japan	Clay	(Australia) John Fitzgerald	(Australia) Cliff Letcher (Australia) Warren Maher	6–1, 7–6
