= Nina Bohm =

Swedish tennis player

- Full name: Nina Bohm
- Country (sports): Sweden
- Born: 30 April 1958 (age 67); Stockholm, Sweden
- Plays: Right-handed

Singles

Grand Slam singles results
- Australian Open: 2R (1978)
- French Open: 4R (1981)
- Wimbledon: 3R (1980, 1981)
- US Open: 2R (1980)

Doubles

Grand Slam doubles results
- French Open: 1R (1981)
- Wimbledon: QF (1981)
- US Open: 1R (1977, 1980)

Nina Bohm (born 30 April 1958) is a former professional tennis player from Sweden.

== Biography ==
Bohm, a right-handed player from Stockholm, made her Fed Cup debut for Sweden in 1978, against France. She appeared in a total of four ties, the other three coming in 1980, where she and partner Helena Anliot won deciding doubles rubbers against France and Japan, before Sweden fell to Australia in the quarter-finals.

During her professional career she competed in the main draw of all four grand slam events. She made the fourth round of the 1981 French Open, with wins over Renáta Tomanová and 14th seed Ivanna Madruga. At the 1981 Wimbledon Championships she was a quarter-finalist in the women's doubles, partnering American Sherry Acker. She also reached the third round of the singles draw that year, where she lost 6–8 in third set against eighth seed Virginia Ruzici.
