= 1981 Stockholm Open =

- Date: 2–8 November
- Edition: 13th
- Category: Grand Prix (Super Series)
- Draw: 64S / 32D
- Prize money: $200,000
- Surface: Hard / indoor
- Location: Stockholm, Sweden
- Venue: Kungliga tennishallen

Champions

Singles
- (United States) Gene Mayer

Doubles
- (South Africa) Kevin Curren / (United States) Steve Denton
- Stockholm Open

The 1981 Stockholm Open was a men's tennis tournament played on hard courts and part of the 1981 Volvo Grand Prix and took place at the Kungliga tennishallen in Stockholm, Sweden. It was the 13th edition of the tournament and was held from 2 November until 8 November 1981. Third-seeded Gene Mayer won the singles title after a victory in the final against his brother Sandy.

== Finals ==
=== Singles ===
(United States) Gene Mayer defeated (United States) Sandy Mayer, 6–4, 6–2

- It was Mayer's 4th singles title of the year and the 11th of his career.

=== Doubles ===
(South Africa) Kevin Curren / (United States) Steve Denton defeated (United States) Sherwood Stewart / (United States) Ferdi Taygan, 6–7, 6–4, 6–0
