= 1981 Wimbledon Championships – Women's singles =

Women's singles
- 1981 Wimbledon Championships

Final
- Champion: (United States) Chris Evert Lloyd
- Runner-up: (Czechoslovakia) Hana Mandlíková
- Score: 6–2, 6–2

Details
- Draw: 96 (8Q / 6WC)
- Seeds: 16

Events
Singles	men	women		boys	girls
Doubles	men	women	mixed	boys	girls
- Wimbledon Championships

Chris Evert Lloyd defeated Hana Mandlíková in the final, 6–2, 6–2 to win the ladies' singles tennis title at the 1981 Wimbledon Championships. It was her third Wimbledon singles title and twelfth major singles title overall, surpassing Margaret Court's Open Era record. Evert did not lose a set during the tournament.

Evonne Goolagong Cawley was the reigning champion, but did not compete due to pregnancy.

For only the second time in the history of the championships and for the first time since 1965, no British player was seeded in the women's singles championship.

== Seeds ==
1. (United States) Chris Evert Lloyd (champion)
2. (Czechoslovakia) Hana Mandlíková (final)
3. (United States) Tracy Austin (quarterfinals)
4. (United States) Martina Navratilova (semifinals)
5. (United States) Andrea Jaeger (fourth round)
6. (Australia) Wendy Turnbull (quarterfinals)
7. (United States) Pam Shriver (semifinals)
8. (Romania) Virginia Ruzici (quarterfinals)
9. (West Germany) Sylvia Hanika (first round)
10. (Socialist Federal Republic of Yugoslavia) Mima Jaušovec (quarterfinals)
11. (Australia) Dianne Fromholtz (third round)
12. (United States) Kathy Jordan (fourth round)
13. (West Germany) Bettina Bunge (second round)
14. (United States) Barbara Potter (fourth round)
15. (Czechoslovakia) Regina Maršíková (first round)
16. (United States) JoAnne Russell (first round)

Click on the seed number of a player to go to their draw section.

Hana Mandlíková was seeded second, higher than her then current ranking of 5th at the start of the championship, due to her victory in the previous grand slam singles event in France. Although perfectly within their remit and rights to alter the seedings from the rankings as they saw fit, the All England Club were petitioned by the WTA, which complained about the arrangement.

== Draw ==
Key

- Q = Qualifier
- WC = Wild card
- LL = Lucky loser
- Alt = Alternate
- ITF = ITF entry
- PR = Protected ranking
- SR = Special ranking
- SE = Special exempt
- JE = Junior exempt
- JR = Junior Accelerator Programme entrant
- CO = College Accelerator Programme entrant
- NG = Next Gen Accelerator Program entrant
- w/o = Walkover
- r = Retired
- d = Defaulted

=== Finals ===
Quarterfinals
1	(United States) Chris Evert Lloyd	6	6
10	(Socialist Federal Republic of Yugoslavia) Mima Jaušovec	2	2
3	(United States) Tracy Austin	5	4
7	(United States) Pam Shriver	7	6
8	(Romania) Virginia Ruzici	2	3
4	(United States) Martina Navratilova	6	6
6	(Australia) Wendy Turnbull	0	0
2	(Czechoslovakia) Hana Mandlíková	6	6

Semifinals
1	(United States) Chris Evert Lloyd	6	6
7	(United States) Pam Shriver	3	1
4	(United States) Martina Navratilova	5	6	1
2	(Czechoslovakia) Hana Mandlíková	7	4	6

Final
1	(United States) Chris Evert Lloyd	6	6
2	(Czechoslovakia) Hana Mandlíková	2	2

=== Top half ===
==== Section 1 ====
First round
1	(United States) C Evert Lloyd	6	6
Q	(Australia) C O'Neil	3	0
(United States) S Jaeger	1	2
(United States) K Sands	6	6
(United States) K Rinaldi	6	2	9
(South Africa) S Rollinson	3	6	7
WC	(United Kingdom) L Charles	5	6
(Switzerland) P Delhees	7	7

Second round
1	(United States) C Evert Lloyd	6	6
(South Africa) Y Vermaak	1	2
(United States) K Sands	1	5
(United States) L Forood	6	7
(United States) K Rinaldi	6	0	0
Q	(Switzerland) C Pasquale	3	6	6
(Switzerland) P Delhees	6	4
11	(Australia) D Fromholtz	7	6

Third round
1	(United States) C Evert Lloyd	6	7
(United States) L Forood	2	6
Q	(Switzerland) C Pasquale	3	6	7
11	(Australia) D Fromholtz	6	2	5

Fourth round
1	(United States) C Evert Lloyd	6	6
Q	(Switzerland) C Pasquale	0	0

==== Section 2 ====
First round
10	(Socialist Federal Republic of Yugoslavia) M Jaušovec	0	6	6
(United States) M Louie	6	2	4
(South Africa) T Harford	6	6
(United States) A White	2	4
(United States) L Allen	6	6
WC	(United Kingdom) A Cooper	1	3
(Australia) N Gregory	1	1
5	(United States) A Jaeger	6	6

Second round
10	(Socialist Federal Republic of Yugoslavia) M Jaušovec	6	6
Q	(Switzerland) C Jolissaint	3	3
(United States) R Blount	2	7	6
(South Africa) T Harford	6	6	3
(United States) L Allen	4	6	6
(Hungary) M Pinterová	6	2	1
(Netherlands) B Stöve	6	4	3
5	(United States) A Jaeger	4	6	6

Third round
10	(Socialist Federal Republic of Yugoslavia) M Jaušovec	6	7
(United States) R Blount	2	5
(United States) L Allen	1	2
5	(United States) A Jaeger	6	6

Fourth round
10	(Socialist Federal Republic of Yugoslavia) M Jaušovec	6	7
5	(United States) A Jaeger	4	6

==== Section 3 ====
First round
3	(United States) T Austin	6	6
LL	(South Africa) J Mundel	0	2
(Argentina) I Madruga	3	6	4
(Australia) S Leo	6	2	6
(United States) S Collins	6	6
WC	(United States) R Casals	3	2
(United States) A Kiyomura	3	0
(West Germany) C Kohde	6	6

Second round
3	(United States) T Austin	6	6
(United States) L Antonoplis	1	1
Q	(Brazil) G Langela	1	6	2
(Australia) S Leo	6	4	6
(Australia) S Saliba	3	1
(United States) S Collins	6	6
(West Germany) C Kohde	4	6
14	(United States) B Potter	6	7

Third round
3	(United States) T Austin	6	7
(Australia) S Leo	4	6
(United States) S Collins	4	1
14	(United States) B Potter	6	6

Fourth round
3	(United States) T Austin	6	6
14	(United States) B Potter	4	0

==== Section 4 ====
First round
15	(Czechoslovakia) R Maršíková	7	1	3
(Romania) L Romanov	5	6	6
(United States) P Casale	7	6
WC	(United Kingdom) K Brasher	5	3
(United Kingdom) G Coles	7	6
(United States) T Holladay	5	4
(Sweden) E Ekblom	6	1	2
7	(United States) P Shriver	3	6	6

Second round
(Romania) L Romanov	6	4	3
(United Kingdom) J Durie	3	6	6
(United States) P Casale	6	5	2
(United States) W White	3	7	6
(United States) P Smith	6	0	4
(United Kingdom) G Coles	3	6	6
Q	(Australia) E Little	0	3
7	(United States) P Shriver	6	6

Third round
(United Kingdom) J Durie	7	6
(United States) W White	5	2
(United Kingdom) G Coles	0	3
7	(United States) P Shriver	6	6

Fourth round
(United Kingdom) J Durie	3	4
7	(United States) P Shriver	6	6

=== Bottom half ===
==== Section 5 ====
First round
8	(Romania) V Ruzici	6	6
(United States) K Cummings	3	4
(United States) S Margolin	0	7	3
(Sweden) N Bohm	6	6	6
(Argentina) C Casabianca	1	4
(Switzerland) H Strachoňová	6	6
Q	(Netherlands) M Mesker	6	6
(United States) K Jones	2	3

Second round
8	(Romania) V Ruzici	4	7	6
Q	(Sweden) M Wikstedt	6	6	4
(Sweden) N Bohm	7	4	6
(West Germany) H Eisterlehner	6	6	2
(Switzerland) H Strachoňová	6	1	4
(United States) S Acker	4	6	6
Q	(Netherlands) M Mesker	4	3
12	(United States) K Jordan	6	6

Third round
8	(Romania) V Ruzici	3	7	8
(Sweden) N Bohm	6	6	6
(United States) S Acker	3	4
12	(United States) K Jordan	6	6

Fourth round
8	(Romania) V Ruzici	3	6	6
12	(United States) K Jordan	6	4	3

==== Section 6 ====
First round
(United Kingdom) S Barker	3	6	6
(Canada) M Blackwood	6	2	3
(United States) E Nagelsen	6	6
(Switzerland) I Villiger	2	1
(United States) E Norton	2	6
(United States) S Walsh	6	7
(United States) J Portman	4	0
4	(United States) M Navratilova	6	6

Second round
13	(West Germany) B Bunge	7	3	3
(United Kingdom) S Barker	6	6	6
(United States) E Nagelsen	6	2	6
Q	(South Africa) E Gordon	0	6	2
(Australia) E Sayers	5	3
(United States) S Walsh	7	6
(United States) S Mascarin	0	1
4	(United States) M Navratilova	6	6

Third round
(United Kingdom) S Barker	6	2	3
(United States) E Nagelsen	2	6	6
(United States) S Walsh	1	6	0
4	(United States) M Navratilova	6	2	6

Fourth round
(United States) E Nagelsen	3	1
4	(United States) M Navratilova	6	6

==== Section 7 ====
First round
6	(Australia) W Turnbull	7	6
(United States) D Desfor	5	3
(South Africa) R Fairbank	6	3	6
(United States) C Reynolds	2	6	3
(West Germany) E Pfaff	6	6
(Australia) D Freeman	3	3
(United States) P Teeguarden	6	6	11
16	(United States) J Russell	2	7	9

Second round
6	(Australia) W Turnbull	6	6
(United Kingdom) D Jevans	2	2
(South Korea) D-h Lee	3	1
(South Africa) R Fairbank	6	6
(West Germany) E Pfaff	2	6	2
(Czechoslovakia) R Tomanová	6	1	6
(United States) L duPont	3	6	4
(United States) P Teeguarden	6	3	6

Third round
6	(Australia) W Turnbull	6	6
(South Africa) R Fairbank	3	2
(Czechoslovakia) R Tomanová	4	3
(United States) P Teeguarden	6	6

Fourth round
6	(Australia) W Turnbull	6	6
(United States) P Teeguarden	4	1

==== Section 8 ====
First round
9	(West Germany) S Hanika	4	5
(United States) M-L Piatek	6	7
(West Germany) I Riedel-Kühn	1	1
(United Kingdom) A Hobbs	6	6
(United States) B Hallquist	3	6	6
(Netherlands) E Vessies-Appel	6	4	3
(France) C Vanier	3	5
2	(Czechoslovakia) H Mandlíková	6	7

Second round
(United States) M-L Piatek	7	6
(United States) L Morse	6	1
(United Kingdom) A Hobbs	6	7
(United Kingdom) V Wade	1	6
(United States) A Buchanan	0	6	6
(United States) B Hallquist	6	3	3
(United States) A Smith	1	4
2	(Czechoslovakia) H Mandlíková	6	6

Third round
(United States) M-L Piatek	6	6	5
(United Kingdom) A Hobbs	7	1	7
(United States) A Buchanan	3	0
2	(Czechoslovakia) H Mandlíková	6	6

Fourth round
(United Kingdom) A Hobbs	3	2
2	(Czechoslovakia) H Mandlíková	6	6

Preceded by 1981 French Open – Women's singles	Grand Slam women's singles	Succeeded by 1981 US Open – Women's singles
