= Claudia Pasquale =

Swiss tennis player

- Full name: Claudia Roshardt-Pasquale
- Country (sports): Switzerland
- Born: 22 May 1963 (age 62)

Singles
- Career record: -

Grand Slam singles results
- French Open: 2R (1983)
- Wimbledon: 4R (1981)
- US Open: 2R (1982)

Doubles
- Career record: -

Claudia Roshardt-Pasquale (born 22 May 1963) is a retired professional tennis player from Switzerland.

== Biography ==
=== Tennis career ===
Pasquale played in three Federation Cup ties for Switzerland. She debuted in Switzerland's quarterfinal loss to the USSR in the 1979 Federation Cup and lost her singles match to Natasha Chmyreva in three sets. In the 1980 competition, she featured in a 3–0 whitewash over Greece in the first round, then sat out of the action as Switzerland made it to the semifinals. She was recalled for the opening rubber of the semifinal against the United States, replacing Isabelle Villiger, but was unable to trouble Andrea Jaeger, and Switzerland was beaten easily in the tie.

Her most notable performance on tour was reaching the fourth round of the 1981 Wimbledon Championships as a qualifier. Having received a bye in the opening round, Pasquale started with a second round win over Kathy Rinaldi, who had earlier become the youngest player to win a Wimbledon match, at 14. In the third round she upset 11th seed Dianne Fromholtz, then was eliminated by eventual champion Chris Evert Lloyd 6–0, 6–0 to end her run.

=== Personal life ===
Now known by her married name Roshardt, she has two sons who competed in tennis. The eldest Robin won the Orange Bowl in 2005 and made two main draw appearances at the Swiss Open Gstaad. Younger son Luca played on the international juniors circuit.
