= Glen Holroyd =

American tennis player

- Full name: Glen Holroyd
- Country (sports): United States
- Born: September 25, 1954 (age 70)

Singles
- Career record: 5-17
- Career titles: 0
- Highest ranking: No. 185 (January 4, 1982)

Grand Slam singles results
- Wimbledon: 1R (1981)

Doubles
- Career record: 11-38
- Career titles: 0
- Highest ranking: No. 175 (January 3, 1983)

Grand Slam doubles results
- Australian Open: 1R (1980)
- French Open: 1R (1980)
- Wimbledon: 3R (1981)

Glen Holroyd (born September 25, 1954) is a former professional tennis player from the United States and played college tennis at Arizona State University.

== Biography ==
=== Career ===
Holroyd competed professionally in the early 1980s.

He made the main singles draw of the 1981 Wimbledon Championships and was beaten in the first round by 16th seed Vitas Gerulaitis, then in the men's doubles made it all the way to the third round with partner Walter Redondo, where they took eventual finalists Bob Lutz and Stan Smith to five sets. His two other Grand Slam main draw appearances were in doubles, at the Australian and French Opens in 1980, with Craig Wittus.

On the Challenger circuit he won a doubles title in Guadalajara in 1981, with Eric Sherbeck as his partner.

His best performance on the Grand Prix tour was a win over former world number four Raúl Ramírez on clay in Boston in 1982. He retired from professional tennis in 1983.

=== Personal life ===
Holroyd went to Cortez High School in Phoenix and has a degree from Arizona State University.

He is the maternal uncle of golfer Jamie Lovemark.

== Challenger titles ==
=== Doubles: (1) ===
| No. | Year | Tournament | Surface | Partner | Opponents | Score |
|---|---|---|---|---|---|---|
| 1. | 1981 | Guadalajara, Mexico | Clay | (United States) Eric Sherbeck | (United States) Bruce Kleege (United States) Andy Kohlberg | 6–7, 6–4, 7–6 |
