= 1981 Wimbledon Championships – Boys' singles =

Boys' singles
- 1981 Wimbledon Championships

Final
- Champion: (United States) Matt Anger
- Runner-up: (Australia) Pat Cash
- Score: 7–6^{(7–3)}, 7–5

Events
Singles	men	women		boys	girls
Doubles	men	women	mixed	boys	girls
← 1980 ·	Wimbledon Championships	· 1982 →

Matt Anger defeated Pat Cash in the final, 7–6^{(7–3)}, 7–5 to win the boys' singles tennis title at the 1981 Wimbledon Championships.

== Seeds ==
1. (Sweden) Joakim Nyström (quarterfinals)
2. (Sweden) Jörgen Windahl (third round)
3. (Australia) Wally Masur (third round)
4. (France) Henri Leconte (semifinals)
5. n/a
6. (Australia) Pat Cash (final)
7. (United States) Matt Anger (champion)
8. (Socialist Federal Republic of Yugoslavia) Slobodan Živojinović (second round)

Click on the seed number of a player to go to their draw section.

== Draw ==
=== Key ===
- Q = Qualifier
- WC = Wild card
- LL = Lucky loser
- Alt = Alternate
- SE = Special exempt
- PR = Protected ranking
- ITF = ITF entry
- JE = Junior exempt
- w/o = Walkover
- r = Retired
- d = Defaulted
- SR = Special ranking

=== Finals ===
Quarterfinals
1	(Sweden) Joakim Nyström	1	3
6	(Australia) Pat Cash	6	6
4	(France) Henri Leconte	7	6
(United States) Eric Korita	6	4
(West Germany) Hans Schwaier	2	6	6
(United States) Michael Kures	6	4	4
7	(United States) Matt Anger	6	7
(Australia) Carl Limberger	4	6

Semifinals
6	(Australia) Pat Cash	4	7	4
4	(France) Henri Leconte	6	6	5^{r}
(West Germany) Hans Schwaier	6	2	3
7	(United States) Matt Anger	3	6	6

Final
6	(Australia) Pat Cash	6	5
7	(United States) Matt Anger	7	7

=== Top half ===
==== Section 1 ====
First round
1	(Sweden) Joakim Nyström	6	6
(India) M Kapoor	0	3
(Australia) Hans Hansson	7	4	6
(United States) Todd Witsken	6	6	2
(Japan) Taisen Kanai	1	1
(France) Loïc Courteau	6	6
(United Kingdom) Stuart Bale	6	4	3
(Portugal) Pedro Cordeiro	3	6	6
(Lebanon) KS Khoury	0	0
(Argentina) Martín Jaite	6	6
(South Africa) Barry Moir	6	6
(United Kingdom) David Felgate	4	4
(Czechoslovakia) Miloslav Mečíř	1	6	4
(Belgium) N Van der Voort	6	3	6
(Philippines) Nilo Natividad	3	0
6	(Australia) Pat Cash	6	6

Second round
1	(Sweden) J Nyström	5	6	9
(Australia) H Hansson	7	3	7
(France) L Courteau	4	7	6
(Portugal) P Cordeiro	6	6	4
(Argentina) M Jaite	2	2
(South Africa) B Moir	6	6
(Belgium) N Van der Voort	3	2
6	(Australia) P Cash	6	6

Third round
1	(Sweden) J Nyström	6	1	12
(France) L Courteau	4	6	10
(South Africa) B Moir	2	4
6	(Australia) P Cash	6	6

Quarterfinals
1	(Sweden) J Nyström	1	3
6	(Australia) P Cash	6	6

==== Section 2 ====
First round
4	(France) Henri Leconte	6	6
(Switzerland) Dominik Utzinger	4	3
(Poland) Gabriel Kilanowski	1	4
(Mexico) Jorge Lozano	6	6
(Denmark) Steen Dannisgard	6	7
(Hong Kong) Mark Bailey	3	6
(Italy) Luca Bottazzi	7	6
(Venezuela) Sergio Speciale	6	1
(United Kingdom) Darryl Shaw	2	6	4
(South Africa) Marcel van der Merwe	6	4	6
(United Kingdom) Paul Heath	6	7	4
(Sweden) Magnus Tideman	7	6	6
(West Germany) Harald Rittersbacher	3	3
(United States) Eric Korita	6	6
(Luxembourg) Johny Goudenbour	1	2
8	(Socialist Federal Republic of Yugoslavia) Slobodan Živojinović	6	6

Second round
4	(France) H Leconte	6	6
(Mexico) J Lozano	2	3
(Denmark) S Dannisgard	3	2
(Italy) L Bottazzi	6	6
(South Africa) M van der Merwe	4	6
(Sweden) M Tideman	6	7
(United States) E Korita	6	6
8	(Socialist Federal Republic of Yugoslavia) S Živojinović	4	2

Third round
4	(France) H Leconte	6	6
(Italy) L Bottazzi	2	2
(Sweden) M Tideman	3	7	4
(United States) E Korita	6	5	6

Quarterfinals
4	(France) H Leconte	7	6
(United States) E Korita	6	4

=== Bottom half ===
==== Section 3 ====
First round
(Peru) L Malaga	0	2
(West Germany) Hans Schwaier	6	6
(South Africa) Craig Campbell	6	6
(Chile) José Antonio Fernández	3	2
(United Kingdom) Steve Shaw	7	6
(Brazil) Jaime Oncins	5	4
(India) D Bhargava	3	0
(Italy) Francesco Cancellotti	6	6
(Belgium) Marc Bodeux	2	2
(United States) Michael Kures	6	6
(Sweden) Henrik Sundström	6	6
(Mexico) F Perez	2	4
(Argentina) Horacio Marin	6	6
(Japan) Toshiyuki Tsuji	3	1
(Colombia) Ruben Perczek	1	3
3	(Australia) Wally Masur	6	6

Second round
(West Germany) H Schwaier	6	6
(South Africa) C Campbell	3	2
(United Kingdom) S Shaw	6	6
(Italy) F Cancellotti	3	4
(United States) M Kures	6	6
(Sweden) H Sundström	3	4
(Argentina) H Marin	1	1
3	(Australia) W Masur	6	6

Third round
(West Germany) H Schwaier	6	6
(United Kingdom) S Shaw	3	3
(United States) M Kures	7	6
3	(Australia) W Masur	6	3

Quarterfinals
(West Germany) H Schwaier	2	6	6
(United States) M Kures	6	4	4

==== Section 4 ====
First round
7	(United States) Matt Anger	6	6
(Chile) Iván Camus	1	3
(Hong Kong) Kelvin Ng	6	4	11
(Haiti) Ronald Agénor	4	6	9
(Israel) Amos Mansdorf	5	4
(Japan) Satoshi Nakamura	7	6
(Zimbabwe) Orlando Lourenco	3	2
(Canada) Mitch Perkins	6	6
(Malaysia) Rudy Foo	1	1
(United Kingdom) Nick Fulwood	6	6
(Peru) Carlos di Laura	3	2
(Australia) Carl Limberger	6	6
(Australia) O Wegner	4	3
(South Africa) Michael Robertson	6	6
(Finland) Kimmo Alkio	2	3
2	(Sweden) Jörgen Windahl	6	6

Second round
7	(United States) M Anger	6	7
(Hong Kong) K Ng	2	5
(Japan) S Nakamura	1	2
(Canada) M Perkins	6	6
(United Kingdom) N Fulwood	3	3
(Australia) C Limberger	6	6
(South Africa) M Robertson	3	6	5
2	(Sweden) J Windahl	6	4	7

Third round
7	(United States) M Anger	6	6
(Canada) M Perkins	0	2
(Australia) C Limberger	6	6
2	(Sweden) J Windahl	4	3

Quarterfinals
7	(United States) M Anger	6	7
(Australia) C Limberger	4	6
