= Isabelle Villiger =

Swiss tennis player

- Full name: Isabelle Bianchi-Villiger
- Country (sports): Switzerland
- Born: 24 November 1962 (age 63) Zürich, Switzerland
- Plays: Right-handed

Singles
- Career titles: 0
- Highest ranking: No. 41 (31 December 1981)

Grand Slam singles results
- Australian Open: 1R (1981)
- French Open: 1R (1981, 1982)
- Wimbledon: 1R (1981)

Doubles
- Career titles: 0

Grand Slam doubles results
- Wimbledon: 1R (1981)

Grand Slam mixed doubles results
- Wimbledon: 1R (1981)

Team competitions
- Fed Cup: QF (1981)

Isabelle Villiger (born 24 November 1962) is a Swiss former tennis player who was active during the 1980s. She reached a highest singles ranking of world number 41 in December 1981. In 1979 and 1980 she reached the semifinals of the junior singles event at Wimbledon and in 1981 competed in the Wimbledon singles, doubles and mixed doubles events. That year she also took part in the Australian Open and French Open.

Villiger was a member of the Swiss Federation Cup team in 1978, 1981 and 1982 where she had a record of two wins and two losses in singles.
