= 1981 Wimbledon Championships – Women's doubles =

Women's doubles
- 1981 Wimbledon Championships

Final
- Champions: (United States) Martina Navratilova (United States) Pam Shriver
- Runners-up: (United States) Kathy Jordan (United States) Anne Smith
- Score: 6–3, 7–6^{(8–6)}

Details
- Draw: 48 (4 Q )
- Seeds: 12

Events
Singles	men	women		boys	girls
Doubles	men	women	mixed	boys	girls
← 1980 ·	Wimbledon Championships	· 1982 →

Martina Navratilova and Pam Shriver defeated the defending champions Kathy Jordan and Anne Smith in the final, 6–3, 7–6^{(8–6)} to win the ladies' doubles tennis title at the 1981 Wimbledon Championships.

== Seeds ==
1. (United States) Kathy Jordan / (United States) Anne Smith (final)
2. (United States) Martina Navratilova / (United States) Pam Shriver (champions)
3. (United States) Rosie Casals / (Australia) Wendy Turnbull (second round)
4. (United Kingdom) Sue Barker / (United States) Ann Kiyomura (semifinals)
5. (United States) Candy Reynolds / (United States) Paula Smith (third round)
6. (United States) Barbara Potter / (United States) Sharon Walsh (quarterfinals)
7. (South Africa) Rosalyn Fairbank / (South Africa) Tanya Harford (semifinals)
8. n/a
9. (United States) JoAnne Russell / (Romania) Virginia Ruzici (third round)
10. (West Germany) Sylvia Hanika / (United States) Andrea Jaeger (third round)
11. (United States) Chris Evert Lloyd / (United Kingdom) Virginia Wade (quarterfinals)
12. (United States) Mary-Lou Piatek / (United States) Wendy White (third round)

Click on the seed number of a player to go to their draw section.

== Draw ==
=== Key ===
- Q = Qualifier
- WC = Wild card
- LL = Lucky loser
- Alt = Alternate
- SE = Special exempt
- PR = Protected ranking
- ITF = ITF entry
- JE = Junior exempt
- w/o = Walkover
- r = Retired
- d = Defaulted
- SR = Special ranking

=== Finals ===
Quarterfinals
1	(United States) Kathy Jordan (United States) Anne Smith	6	6
11	(United States) Chris Evert Lloyd (United Kingdom) Virginia Wade	2	3
(Canada) Marjorie Blackwood (Australia) Susan Leo	3	4
7	(South Africa) Rosalyn Fairbank (South Africa) Tanya Harford	6	6
(United States) Sherry Acker (Sweden) Nina Bohm	7	3	4
4	(United Kingdom) Sue Barker (United States) Ann Kiyomura	6	6	6
6	(United States) Barbara Potter (United States) Sharon Walsh	1	2
2	(United States) Martina Navratilova (United States) Pam Shriver	6	6

Semifinals
1	(United States) Kathy Jordan (United States) Anne Smith	6	6
7	(South Africa) Rosalyn Fairbank (South Africa) Tanya Harford	1	2
4	(United Kingdom) Sue Barker (United States) Ann Kiyomura	3	7	2
2	(United States) Martina Navratilova (United States) Pam Shriver	6	6	6

Final
1	(United States) Kathy Jordan (United States) Anne Smith	3	6^{6}
2	(United States) Martina Navratilova (United States) Pam Shriver	6	7^{8}

=== Top half ===
==== Section 1 ====
First round
Q	(United States) E Burgin (United States) H Ludloff	2	2
(Australia) N Gregory (Hungary) M Pinterová	6	6
(South Africa) I Kloss (United States) P Teeguarden	6	6
(United States) R Blount (Switzerland) I Villiger	2	3
11	(United States) C Evert Lloyd (United Kingdom) V Wade	6	6
Q	(Australia) D Chesterton (United Kingdom) D Taylor	1	2
(United States) L Antonoplis (United States) K Jones	6	4	3
5	(United States) C Reynolds (United States) P Smith	1	6	6

Second round
1	(United States) K Jordan (United States) A Smith	6	6
(Australia) N Gregory (Hungary) M Pinterová	4	2
(United States) D Desfor (United States) B Hallquist	3	1
(South Africa) I Kloss (United States) P Teeguarden	6	6
11	(United States) C Evert Lloyd (United Kingdom) V Wade	6	6
(Czechoslovakia) R Tomanová (United States) N Yeargin	4	2
(United States) L duPont (Czechoslovakia) R Maršíková	1	0
5	(United States) C Reynolds (United States) P Smith	6	6

Third round
1	(United States) K Jordan (United States) A Smith	6	5	6
(South Africa) I Kloss (United States) P Teeguarden	3	7	2
11	(United States) C Evert Lloyd (United Kingdom) V Wade	6	6
5	(United States) C Reynolds (United States) P Smith	2	4

Quarterfinals
1	(United States) K Jordan (United States) A Smith	6	6
11	(United States) C Evert Lloyd (United Kingdom) V Wade	2	3

==== Section 2 ====
First round
3	(United States) R Casals (Australia) W Turnbull	6	6
(South Korea) D-h Lee (United States) J Portman	0	1
(United Kingdom) G Coles (South Africa) Y Vermaak	2	3
10	(West Germany) S Hanika (United States) A Jaeger	6	6
LL	(United States) B Blaney (Australia) C O'Neil	3	6	6
(West Germany) B Bunge (West Germany) C Kohde	6	3	2
(United States) S Collins (Switzerland) H Strachoňová	3	1
7	(South Africa) R Fairbank (South Africa) T Harford	6	6

Second round
3	(United States) R Casals (Australia) W Turnbull	4	6
(Canada) M Blackwood (Australia) S Leo	6	7
(United States) S McInerney (United States) B Norton	2	3
10	(West Germany) S Hanika (United States) A Jaeger	6	6
(Australia) E Little (Australia) S Saliba	5	6	13
LL	(United States) B Blaney (Australia) C O'Neil	7	4	11
(West Germany) E Pfaff (Romania) L Romanov	3	1
7	(South Africa) R Fairbank (South Africa) T Harford	6	6

Third round
(Canada) M Blackwood (Australia) S Leo	6	6
10	(West Germany) S Hanika (United States) A Jaeger	4	2
(Australia) E Little (Australia) S Saliba	7	4	6
7	(South Africa) R Fairbank (South Africa) T Harford	5	6	8

Quarterfinals
(Canada) M Blackwood (Australia) S Leo	3	4
7	(South Africa) R Fairbank (South Africa) T Harford	6	6

=== Bottom half ===
==== Section 3 ====
First round
LL	(South Africa) J Mundel (South Africa) S Rollinson	6	6
(United States) S Mascarin (United States) K Rinaldi	2	2
(United States) L Forood (United States) A Henricksson	4	3
(United States) A Buchanan (United States) K Sands	6	6
9	(United States) J Russell (Romania) V Ruzici	7	6
(United Kingdom) J Durie (United Kingdom) D Jevans	5	1
(United Kingdom) L Charles (United Kingdom) A Cooper	1	3
4	(United Kingdom) S Barker (United States) A Kiyomura	6	6

Second round
LL	(South Africa) J Mundel (South Africa) S Rollinson	0	6
(United States) S Acker (Sweden) N Bohm	6	7
(United States) S Margolin (United States) A White	4	3
(United States) A Buchanan (United States) K Sands	6	6
9	(United States) J Russell (Romania) V Ruzici	2	6	7
(United Kingdom) A Hobbs (Socialist Federal Republic of Yugoslavia) M Jaušovec	6	4	5
(United States) L Allen (United States) E Nagelsen	5	5
4	(United Kingdom) S Barker (United States) A Kiyomura	7	7

Third round
(United States) S Acker (Sweden) N Bohm	6	6
(United States) A Buchanan (United States) K Sands	3	1
9	(United States) J Russell (Romania) V Ruzici	6	6	7
4	(United Kingdom) S Barker (United States) A Kiyomura	4	7	9

Quarterfinals
(United States) S Acker (Sweden) N Bohm	7	3	4
4	(United Kingdom) S Barker (United States) A Kiyomura	6	6	6

==== Section 4 ====
First round
6	(United States) B Potter (United States) S Walsh	6	6
(Switzerland) C Jolissaint (Netherlands) M Mesker	4	3
(United States) P Johnson (United States) M Louie	1	1
12	(United States) M-L Piatek (United States) W White	6	6
(Australia) D Freeman (Japan) N Sato	6	7
(United States) R McCallum (United States) J Stratton	1	6
Q	(Australia) A Gulley (Australia) K Pratt	2	2
2	(United States) M Navratilova (United States) P Shriver	6	6

Second round
6	(United States) B Potter (United States) S Walsh	6	7
Q	(South Africa) R du Toit (Australia) B Remilton	2	5
(United States) J Goodling (Netherlands) N Schutte	1	4
12	(United States) M-L Piatek (United States) W White	6	6
(United States) D Morrison (United States) L Morse	5	5
(Australia) D Freeman (Japan) N Sato	7	7
(New Zealand) C Newton (Australia) P Whytcross	2	0
2	(United States) M Navratilova (United States) P Shriver	6	6

Third round
6	(United States) B Potter (United States) S Walsh	6	6
12	(United States) M-L Piatek (United States) W White	2	2
(Australia) D Freeman (Japan) N Sato	2	3
2	(United States) M Navratilova (United States) P Shriver	6	6

Quarterfinals
6	(United States) B Potter (United States) S Walsh	1	2
2	(United States) M Navratilova (United States) P Shriver	6	6
