= Walter Redondo =

American tennis player and artist

- Country (sports): United States
- Born: 1958 (age 67–68)

Singles
- Career record: 3–10
- Highest ranking: No. 226 (July 12, 1978)

Grand Slam singles results
- Wimbledon: Q2 (1981)

Doubles
- Career record: 10–21
- Highest ranking: No. 224 (January 3, 1983)

Grand Slam doubles results
- Wimbledon: 3R (1981)
- US Open: 1R (1978, 1982)

Walter Redondo (born 1958) is an American artist and former professional tennis player. His elder sister Marita Redondo competed on the WTA Tour.

Redondo is the fifth of nine children born into a Filipino American family from San Diego. Growing up he was a leading player on the junior circuit, ranked top in the country for the 16s, ahead of his peer John McEnroe. The death of his grandmother, who had helped raise him and his siblings, was a catalyst for a gradual decline in his performances.

On the professional tour he reached a career high ranking of 226 in the world. He had a win over Francisco González at a Grand Prix tournament in Tampa in 1981 and was a quarter-finalist at the 1981 Pacific Southwest Open, beating Rolf Gehring en route. As a doubles player he made the round of 16 at the 1981 Wimbledon Championships, with Glen Holroyd.

Since retiring, Redondo has transitioned into a new career as a painter and sculptor.
