= Vadim Borisov =

Russian tennis player

- Country (sports): Soviet Union
- Born: 30 April 1955
- Plays: Right-handed

Singles

Grand Slam singles results
- Wimbledon: 1R (1976)

Doubles

Grand Slam doubles results
- French Open: 1R (1973)

Mixed doubles

Grand Slam mixed doubles results
- French Open: 1R (1973)
- Wimbledon: 1R (1976)
Medal record
Representing Soviet Union
Summer Universiade
Gold medal – first place	1979 Mexico City	Men's Singles
Gold medal – first place	1979 Mexico City	Men's Doubles
Silver medal – second place	1981 Bucharest	Men's Singles
Bronze medal – third place	1981 Bucharest	Men's Doubles
Bronze medal – third place	1977 Sofia	Men's Singles
Friendship Games
Silver medal – second place	1984	Men's singles

Vadim Vadimovich Borisov (born 30 April 1955) is a former Russian tennis player who competed for the Soviet Union.

== Career ==
At the 1973 French Open, Borisov competed in both the men's doubles (with Viorel Marcu) and mixed doubles (with Natasha Chmyreva), but was unable to progress past the opening round in either. His only other Grand Slam appearance came in the 1976 Wimbledon Championships, where he lost in the first round of the singles draw, to Kenichi Hirai. He also played in the mixed doubles, again partnering Natasha Chmyreva and once more lost in the opening round.

Borisov won five medals in the Summer Universiade during his career, including two gold medals at Mexico City in 1979.

In 1980, Borisov was runner-up in both the singles and doubles at the Sofia Open, which was part of the Grand Prix tennis circuit. His singles wins were over Leo Palin, Ismail El Shafei, Andrei Dîrzu and Louk Sanders.

Borisov appeared in 11 ties Davis Cup ties for the Soviet Union team, from 1976 to 1984. He won 11 of his 23 Davis Cup rubbers, finishing with an 8/6 record in singles and 3/6 record in doubles. His best win was over Yannick Noah, at Montpellier in 1980. He was captain of the Russian Davis Cup team which was a finalist in the 1994 Davis Cup.

== Grand Prix career finals ==
=== Singles: 1 (0–1) ===
Result	W/L	Date	Tournament	Surface	Opponent	Score
Loss	0–1	Dec 1980	Sofia, Bulgaria	Carpet	(Sweden) Per Hjertquist	3–6, 2–6, 5–7

=== Doubles: 1 (0–1) ===
Result	W/L	Date	Tournament	Surface	Partner	Opponents	Score
Loss	0–1	Dec 1980	Sofia, Bulgaria	Carpet	(East Germany) Thomas Emmrich	(West Germany) Hartmut Kirchhübel (Austria) Robert Reininger	6–4, 3–6, 4–6

== Challenger titles ==
=== Singles: (1) ===
No.	Year	Tournament	Surface	Opponent	Score
1.	1984	Travemünde, Germany	Clay	(Argentina) Alejandro Ganzábal	7–5, 7–5
