= Robert Reininger =

Austrian tennis player

- Full name: Robert Reininger
- Country (sports): Austria
- Born: 20 January 1958 (age 67); Linz, Austria
- Plays: Right-handed
- Prize money: $57,642

Singles
- Career record: 9–33
- Career titles: 0
- Highest ranking: No. 182 (3 January 1983)

Doubles
- Career record: 15–35
- Career titles: 1
- Highest ranking: No. 224 (8 October 1984)

Robert Reininger (born 20 January 1958) is a former professional tennis player from Austria.

== Biography ==
Reininger, a right-handed player from Linz, was the Austrian junior champion in 1975. He followed it up with a national Under 21s title in 1976, then in 1979 was Austria's Indoor and Outdoor Championships in both singles and doubles.

The top ranked player in Austria in 1979 and 1981, Reininger appeared in seven ties for the Austria Davis Cup team. This included a tie against Great Britain in Bristol and a match against Ilie Năstase in Bucharest.

His only title on the Grand Prix tennis circuit was in the doubles at the Sofia Open in 1980. An unseeded pairing, he partnered with Hartmut Kirchhübel to win the tournament. As a singles player his best performances came in his home event, the Grand Prix tournament held in Linz. He made the quarter-finals twice, in 1981 and 1982.

He now runs an insurance company in Linz.

== Grand Prix career finals ==
=== Doubles: 1 (1–0) ===
| Result | W/L | Date | Tournament | Surface | Partner | Opponents | Score |
|---|---|---|---|---|---|---|---|
| Win | 1–0 | Dec 1980 | Sofia, Bulgaria | Carpet (i) | (West Germany) Hartmut Kirchhübel | (Soviet Union) Vadim Borisov (East Germany) Thomas Emmrich | 4–6, 6–3, 6–4 |

== See also ==
- List of Austria Davis Cup team representatives
