= 1981 Wimbledon Championships – Men's singles =

Men's singles
- 1981 Wimbledon Championships

Final
- Champion: (United States) John McEnroe
- Runner-up: (Sweden) Björn Borg
- Score: 4–6, 7–6^{(7–1)}, 7–6^{(7–4)}, 6–4

Details
- Draw: 128 (16Q / 8WC)
- Seeds: 16

Events
Singles	men	women		boys	girls
Doubles	men	women	mixed	boys	girls
- Wimbledon Championships

John McEnroe defeated five-time defending champion Björn Borg in a rematch of the previous year's final, 4–6, 7–6^{(7–1)}, 7–6^{(7–4)}, 6–4 to win the gentlemen's singles tennis title at the 1981 Wimbledon Championships on the 4th of July. It was his first Wimbledon singles title and third major singles title overall. Borg was attempting to equal William Renshaw's record of six consecutive Wimbledon titles and Roy Emerson's all-time record of 12 Grand Slam tournament singles titles. It was Borg's last Wimbledon appearance.

During this tournament, McEnroe famously shouted "You cannot be serious!" to the chair umpire in response to a serve being called "out". The disagreement took place on 22 June, during his first-round match against Tom Gullikson. McEnroe's prize money for winning the tournament was reduced by $1,500 by fines imposed by the All England Club in regard to his behavior.

== Seeds ==
1. (Sweden) Björn Borg (final)
2. (United States) John McEnroe (champion)
3. (United States) Jimmy Connors (semifinals)
4. (Czechoslovakia) Ivan Lendl (first round)
5. (United States) Gene Mayer (withdrew before the tournament began)
6. (United States) Brian Teacher (second round)
7. (United States) Brian Gottfried (second round)
8. (United States) Roscoe Tanner (second round)
9. (Argentina) José Luis Clerc (third round)
10. (Argentina) Guillermo Vilas (first round)
11. (Paraguay) Víctor Pecci (first round)
12. (Australia) Peter McNamara (quarterfinals)
13. (France) Yannick Noah (first round)
14. (Poland) Wojciech Fibak (fourth round)
15. (Hungary) Balázs Taróczy (third round)
16. (United States) Vitas Gerulaitis (fourth round)

Click on the seed number of a player to go to their draw section.

Gene Mayer withdrew due to injury. He was replaced in the draw by lucky loser Mike Estep.

== Draw ==
Key

- Q = Qualifier
- WC = Wild card
- LL = Lucky loser
- Alt = Alternate
- ITF = ITF entry
- PR = Protected ranking
- SR = Special ranking
- SE = Special exempt
- JE = Junior exempt
- JR = Junior Accelerator Programme entrant
- CO = College Accelerator Programme entrant
- NG = Next Gen Accelerator Program entrant
- w/o = Walkover
- r = Retired
- d = Defaulted

=== Finals ===
Quarterfinals
1	(Sweden) Björn Borg	7^{7}	6	6
12	(Australia) Peter McNamara	6^{2}	2	3
3	(United States) Jimmy Connors	2	5	6	6	6
(India) Vijay Amritraj	6	7	4	3	2
(Australia) Rod Frawley	4	7^{7}	7^{7}	6
(United States) Tim Mayotte	6	6^{5}	6^{4}	3
(South Africa) Johan Kriek	1	5	1
2	(United States) John McEnroe	6	7	6

Semifinals
1	(Sweden) Björn Borg	0	4	6	6	6
3	(United States) Jimmy Connors	6	6	3	0	4
(Australia) Rod Frawley	6^{2}	4	5
2	(United States) John McEnroe	7^{7}	6	7

Final
1	(Sweden) Björn Borg	6	6^{1}	6^{4}	4
2	(United States) John McEnroe	4	7^{7}	7^{7}	6

=== Top half ===
==== Section 1 ====
First round
1	(Sweden) B Borg	7^{7}	6	6
(United States) P Rennert	6^{2}	3	1
Q	(Australia) D Collings	4	3	3
(United States) M Purcell	6	6	6
(United States) F Taygan	7	6	6
(United States) N Saviano	5	1	2
LL	(West Germany) U Marten	6	2	7	0
(West Germany) R Gehring	7	6	6	6
(United States) V Amaya	6	7	6	7
(Austria) P Feigl	4	6	7	6
(United Kingdom) C Mottram	6	6	4	6
WC	(United Kingdom) R Drysdale	1	4	6	3
Q	(United States) J Bailey	7	6	3	6	4
(South Africa) K Curren	6	4	6	7	6
Q	(United States) G Holroyd	3	4	6
16	(United States) V Gerulaitis	6	6	7

Second round
1	(Sweden) B Borg	6	6	6
(United States) M Purcell	4	1	3
(United States) F Taygan	5	1	6
(West Germany) R Gehring	7	6	7
(United States) V Amaya	6	6	6
(United Kingdom) C Mottram	3	4	2
(South Africa) K Curren	3	7	3	3
16	(United States) V Gerulaitis	6	6	6	6

Third round
1	(Sweden) B Borg	6	7	6
(West Germany) R Gehring	4	5	0
(United States) V Amaya	6	4	6	3	5
16	(United States) V Gerulaitis	4	6	3	6	7

Fourth round
1	(Sweden) B Borg	7^{7}	7	7^{8}
16	(United States) V Gerulaitis	6^{4}	5	6^{6}

==== Section 2 ====
First round
12	(Australia) P McNamara	6	6	2	7
(Switzerland) H Günthardt	1	2	6	5
(United States) J Delaney	5	3	7	3
(United States) S Stewart	7	6	6	6
(Spain) Á Giménez	6	7	6
Q	(Sweden) J Windahl	3	5	2
(United States) S Giammalva	3	7	3	6
(Zimbabwe) A Pattison	6	6	6	7
(United States) Tim Gullikson	6	6	6
(Italy) G Rinaldini	1	2	3
(United States) P Fleming	7	6	2	7
(Australia) S Docherty	6	2	6	6
Q	(United States) E van Dillen	2	4	6	2
(United States) J Borowiak	6	6	4	6
(United States) K Walts	3	3	2
7	(United States) B Gottfried	6	6	6

Second round
12	(Australia) P McNamara	6	6	6
(United States) S Stewart	4	0	1
(Spain) Á Giménez	6	6	7	1	4
(Zimbabwe) A Pattison	4	7	6	6	6
(United States) Tim Gullikson	3	7	7	6
(United States) P Fleming	6	6	6	3
(United States) J Borowiak	6	7	6
7	(United States) B Gottfried	4	6	4

Third round
12	(Australia) P McNamara	6	6	7
(Zimbabwe) A Pattison	1	0	5
(United States) Tim Gullikson	3	6	6	3
(United States) J Borowiak	6	7	4	6

Fourth round
12	(Australia) P McNamara	7	6	7
(United States) J Borowiak	6	0	6

==== Section 3 ====
First round
3	(United States) J Connors	6	6	6
(United States) R Stockton	1	2	4
(New Zealand) C Lewis	6	7	0	6	6
Q	(United States) C Dunk	7	6	6	4	4
(Czechoslovakia) T Šmid	5	3	6	2
(United States) P DuPré	7	6	3	6
(United States) A Giammalva	6	7	6
LL	(United States) S Davis	2	6	2
Q	(United States) C Wittus	6	6	6
(South Africa) E Edwards	4	4	4
(Australia) B Drewett	7	4	6	6
(Brazil) M Hocevar	6	6	4	3
Q	(United States) M Davis	7	5	2	7	6
(Israel) S Glickstein	5	7	6	5	4
(United States) M Doyle	4	7	4	5
14	(Poland) W Fibak	6	6	6	7

Second round
3	(United States) J Connors	7	7	6
(New Zealand) C Lewis	6	6	3
(United States) P DuPré	3	4	6	3
(United States) A Giammalva	6	6	1	6
Q	(United States) C Wittus	3	0	4
(Australia) B Drewett	6	6	6
Q	(United States) M Davis	4	4	2
14	(Poland) W Fibak	6	6	6

Third round
3	(United States) J Connors	6	6	6
(United States) A Giammalva	4	4	0
(Australia) B Drewett	6	1	6	6	4
14	(Poland) W Fibak	7	6	3	3	6

Fourth round
3	(United States) J Connors	6	6	6
14	(Poland) W Fibak	3	2	4

==== Section 4 ====
First round
9	(Argentina) JL Clerc	3	6	2	6	9
LL	(Chile) Á Fillol	6	3	6	4	7
WC	(United Kingdom) J Lloyd	6	3	4	6	6
(Australia) P Dent	4	6	6	3	4
(France) P Portes	7	6	2	6
Q	(Australia) W Pascoe	5	7	6	7
(Australia) P Kronk	6	6	3	6
(United States) W Martin	2	3	6	3
(United States) R Van't Hof	6	6	6
(West Germany) K Eberhard	4	4	4
(Netherlands) T Okker	5	7	4	6
(United States) T Wilkison	7	5	6	7
(India) V Amritraj	6	6	7
WC	(Czechoslovakia) J Kodeš	0	1	5
(Switzerland) R Stadler	6	0	3	3
6	(United States) B Teacher	4	6	6	6

Second round
9	(Argentina) JL Clerc	4	6	7	6
WC	(United Kingdom) J Lloyd	6	3	6	4
Q	(Australia) W Pascoe	5	3	4
(Australia) P Kronk	7	6	6
(United States) R Van't Hof	3	4	2
(United States) T Wilkison	6	6	6
(India) V Amritraj	6	2	2	6	6
6	(United States) B Teacher	4	6	6	2	1

Third round
9	(Argentina) JL Clerc	6	4	1	6
(Australia) P Kronk	2	6	6	7
(United States) T Wilkison	3	2	6	4
(India) V Amritraj	6	6	3	6

Fourth round
(Australia) P Kronk	3	3	2
(India) V Amritraj	6	6	6

=== Bottom half ===
==== Section 5 ====
First round
8	(United States) R Tanner	6	6	6
(United States) B Manson	1	4	4
(Brazil) C Kirmayr	6	6	6	6
WC	(United Kingdom) M Cox	3	7	4	4
(United States) L Stefanki	1	6	3
Q	(Australia) C Letcher	6	7	6
(Australia) R Frawley	4	6	6	6
(France) T Tulasne	6	2	3	0
(United States) J Austin	7	2	2	2
Q	(Sweden) M Wilander	6	6	6	6
WC	(Australia) J Alexander	4	6	4	2
LL	(France) H Leconte	6	2	6	6
(Australia) J Fitzgerald	5	7	6	6
Q	(United States) S McCain	7	6	2	3
(United States) W Scanlon	7	6	6
11	(Paraguay) V Pecci	6	0	0

Second round
8	(United States) R Tanner	4	4	6	2
(Brazil) C Kirmayr	6	6	3	6
Q	(Australia) C Letcher	3	1	3
(Australia) R Frawley	6	6	6
Q	(Sweden) M Wilander	4	6	6	6
LL	(France) H Leconte	6	4	2	2
(Australia) J Fitzgerald	6	6	6
(United States) W Scanlon	1	2	2

Third round
(Brazil) C Kirmayr	6	3	3
(Australia) R Frawley	7	6	6
Q	(Sweden) M Wilander	0	6	2	2
(Australia) J Fitzgerald	6	4	6	6

Fourth round
(Australia) R Frawley	6	6	7
(Australia) J Fitzgerald	4	3	6

==== Section 6 ====
First round
10	(Argentina) G Vilas	4	1	6	6	3
(Australia) M Edmondson	6	6	1	4	6
WC	(United Kingdom) R Lewis	5	6	4	4
(United States) F Buehning	7	4	6	6
(United States) S Krulevitz	6	6	4	4	3
(Sweden) H Simonsson	4	2	6	6	6
(Romania) I Năstase	4	6	6	4	4
(United States) A Mayer	6	4	4	6	6
WC	(United Kingdom) A Jarrett	3	7	3	6
(United States) J Sadri	6	6	6	7
(France) C Roger-Vasselin	6	6	7
(Spain) J López-Maeso	4	4	6
(United States) T Mayotte	6	6	6
(South Africa) B Mitton	3	4	2
Q	(Australia) C Fancutt	4	6	6	1	6
4	(Czechoslovakia) I Lendl	6	3	4	6	3

Second round
(Australia) M Edmondson	4	3	7	5
(United States) F Buehning	6	6	5	7
(Sweden) H Simonsson	2	1	6
(United States) A Mayer	6	6	7
(United States) J Sadri	7	6	6	6
(France) C Roger-Vasselin	6	7	3	4
(United States) T Mayotte	4	6	7	6
Q	(Australia) C Fancutt	6	4	6	3

Third round
(United States) F Buehning	4	6	6	7	1
(United States) A Mayer	6	2	7	5	6
(United States) J Sadri	6	3	5
(United States) T Mayotte	7	6	7

Fourth round
(United States) A Mayer	3	4	6
(United States) T Mayotte	6	6	7

==== Section 7 ====
First round
LL	(United States) M Estep	0	3	7	3
(South Africa) J Kriek	6	6	6	6
Q	(India) S Menon	4	0	6	4
LL	(Sweden) J Nyström	6	6	3	6
(New Zealand) R Simpson	7	6	7
LL	(United States) S Denton	6	3	6
Q	(France) G Moretton	4	6	6	6
(Chile) J Fillol	6	3	2	3
(Czechoslovakia) P Složil	3	4	2
(Australia) P McNamee	6	6	6
LL	(Australia) C Johnstone	6	6	4	4	6
Q	(Australia) C Miller	4	1	6	6	3
(Paraguay) F González	6	7	6
(France) C Freyss	0	5	2
(United States) E Fromm	6	6	6
13	(France) Y Noah	4	4	3

Second round
(South Africa) J Kriek	6	6	6
LL	(Sweden) J Nyström	2	4	4
(New Zealand) R Simpson	6	6	3	6
Q	(France) G Moretton	4	4	6	3
(Australia) P McNamee	6	6	6
LL	(Australia) C Johnstone	2	1	2
(Paraguay) F González	6	6	7	6
(United States) E Fromm	3	7	5	3

Third round
(South Africa) J Kriek	7	3	6	7
(New Zealand) R Simpson	6	6	2	5
(Australia) P McNamee	4	2	2
(Paraguay) F González	6	6	6

Fourth round
(South Africa) J Kriek	3	6	7	6
(Paraguay) F González	6	3	6	1

==== Section 8 ====
First round
15	(Hungary) B Taróczy	7	6	6
(Sweden) A Järryd	6	4	3
(United States) R Hightower	2	2	4
(United States) R Meyer	6	6	6
(Zimbabwe) H Ismail	3	1	3
(United States) S Smith	6	6	6
(United States) R Fagel	1	2	1
(Australia) R Case	6	6	6
(Australia) D Carter	3	7	6	1	3
(United States) R Lutz	6	6	4	6	6
(Peru) F Maynetto	6	2	1
WC	(United Kingdom) J Feaver	7	6	6
(South Africa) R Moore	4	5	2
(Mexico) R Ramírez	6	7	6
(United States) To Gullikson	6^{5}	5	3
2	(United States) J McEnroe	7^{7}	7	6

Second round
15	(Hungary) B Taróczy	7	6	7
(United States) R Meyer	6	3	6
(United States) S Smith	6	7	7
(Australia) R Case	3	6	6
(United States) R Lutz	6	7	6
WC	(United Kingdom) J Feaver	3	5	1
(Mexico) R Ramírez	3	7^{8}	3	6^{6}
2	(United States) J McEnroe	6	6^{6}	6	7^{8}

Third round
15	(Hungary) B Taróczy	3	2	3
(United States) S Smith	6	6	6
(United States) R Lutz	4	2	0
2	(United States) J McEnroe	6	6	6

Fourth round
(United States) S Smith	5	6	1	2
2	(United States) J McEnroe	7	3	6	6

Preceded by 1981 French Open	Grand Slams; Men's Singles	Succeeded by 1981 US Open
