= Joyce Portman =

American tennis player (1958–2003)

- Full name: Joyce Oransky nee Portman
- Country (sports): United States
- Born: May 3, 1958
- Died: July 22, 2003 (aged 45)

Singles

Grand Slam singles results
- French Open: 2R (1981)
- Wimbledon: 1R (1981)
- US Open: 3R (1981)

Doubles

Grand Slam doubles results
- French Open: 2R (1981)
- Wimbledon: 1R (1981)
- US Open: 1R (1981)

Joyce Oransky (May 3, 1958 – July 22, 2003) was an American professional tennis player. She competed during her career under her maiden name Joyce Portman.

== Biography ==
Portman played collegiate tennis for the University of Florida, where she came to from Miami Beach Senior High School. She earned All-American selection in 1979 and 1980, finishing with a 51–10 record.

After her collegiate career she played on the professional circuit. She had her best year in 1981, when she was a semi-finalist at the Italian Open and made the quarter-finals of the Family Circle Cup on Hilton Head Island, in addition to making three grand slam main draws. At the 1981 Wimbledon Championships she came up against Martina Navratilova in the first round and lost, but reached the third round of the 1981 US Open. She toured for the last time in 1982.

On July 22, 2003, at the age of 45, Portman died from a large blood clot in her heart. The following year a tennis complex at Westside Park in Gainesville was named the Joyce Oransky Tennis Center.
