= Ismail El Shafei =

Egyptian tennis player

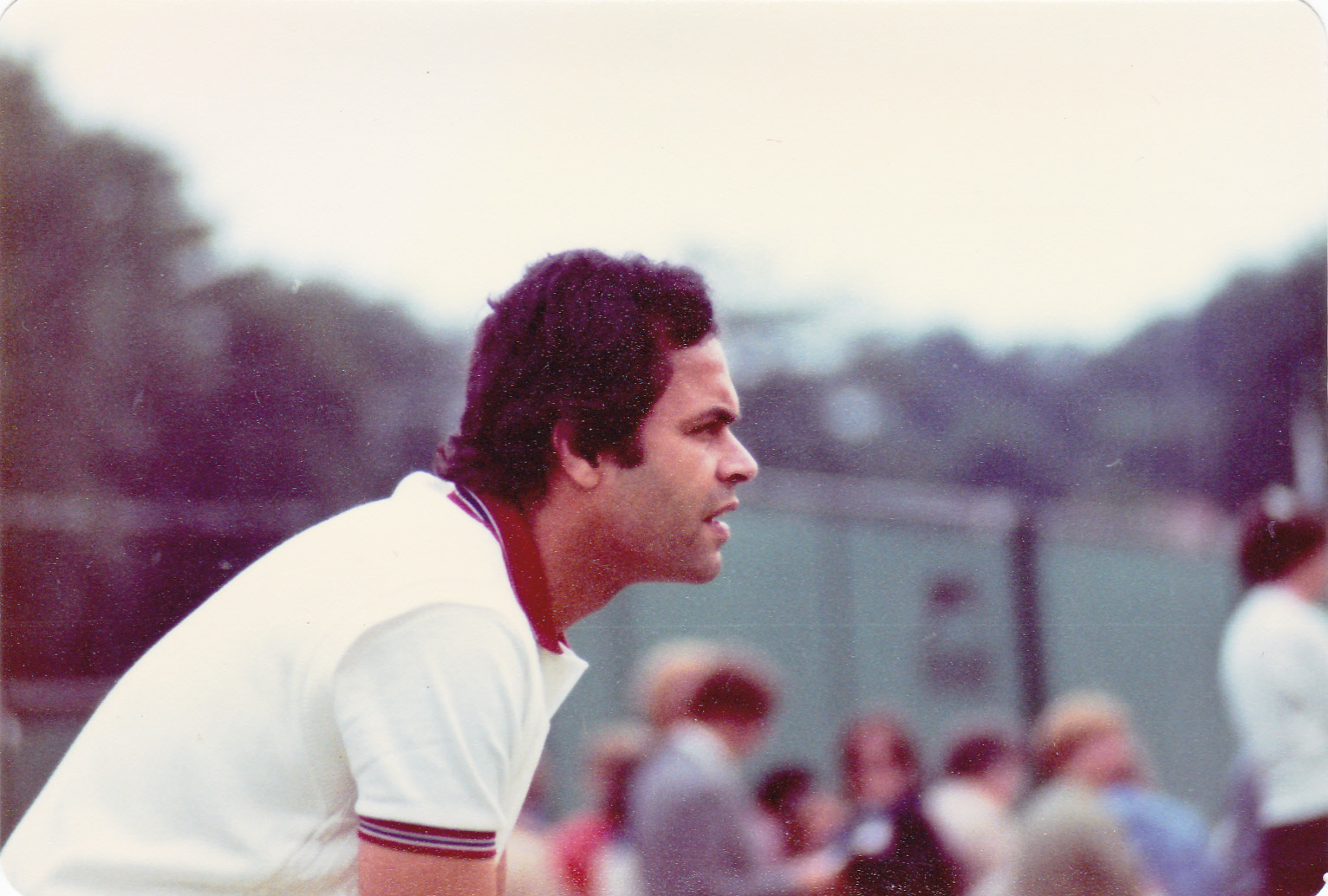
- Ismail El Shafei (1982)
- Country (sports): Egypt
- Residence: Cairo, Egypt
- Born: 15 November 1947 (age 78) Cairo, Kingdom of Egypt
- Turned pro: 1968 (amateur from 1964)
- Retired: March 1983
- Plays: Left-handed (two-handed backhand)

Singles
- Career record: 293–329 (47.1%)
- Career titles: 6
- Highest ranking: No. 34 (8 April 1975)

Grand Slam singles results
- Australian Open: 3R (1971)
- French Open: 3R (1969)
- Wimbledon: QF (1974)
- US Open: 4R (1974)

Doubles
- Career record: 232–216 (Open era)
- Career titles: 9
- Highest ranking: No. 26 (30 August 1977)

Grand Slam doubles results
- Australian Open: QF (1978)
- French Open: 3R (1973, 1974, 1975, 1976, 1978)
- Wimbledon: QF (1981)
- US Open: 4R (1970)

Ismail El Shafei (Arabic: إسماعيل الشافعي) (born 15 November 1947) is an Egyptian former professional tennis player and president of the Egyptian Tennis Federation. He is currently a member of the board of directors of the International Tennis Federation and is chairman of the ITF Junior Circuit. He won six career singles titles and reached eleven finals. In doubles, he won nine career titles.

== Career ==
El Shafei played his first tournament in March 1962 at the Egyptian Championships losing in straight sets to Italian player Giuseppe Merlo in the round of 32. He reached his first tournament final in Ostordorf, West Germany in 1963 before losing to Harald Elschenbroich. In 1964, he won the boys' singles tournament at Wimbledon. He won his first senior's tournament in San Jose, Costa Rica in January 1966. He won the Egyptian Open in Cairo three times (1969, 1974–1974). An adaptable player, he competed on all surfaces, (grass, clay, hardcourt, and carpet). El Shafei is the only Egyptian player to make the top 40 in Grand Prix/ATP ranking history. He is one of only four players to beat Björn Borg at Wimbledon, knocking him out in the third round in 1974 (the other three were John McEnroe, Roger Taylor and Arthur Ashe.) He reached his last professional singles final (exhibition) at the Cairo Invitational losing to Bjorn Borg in two sets in December 1979 and played his last singles tournament in June 1982 at the Bristol Open losing to then South African player Johan Kriek, he retired in 1983.

== Post-playing career ==
Following his playing career El Shafei remained involved in tennis in an administrative role: he was elected president of the Egyptian Tennis Federation on two occasions (1994–96 and 2005–08). In 1998, he was elected to the board of directors of the International Tennis Federation until 2001. He would serve a second term as director of the ITF (2003–2013). In September 2015, he was elected for a third term as a director and is currently chairman of coaching and chairman of the juniors circuit.

== Personal ==
He was educated at Cairo University and is the son of Adli El Shafei and father of Adli El Shafei II.

== Career finals ==
=== Singles: 17 (6 titles, 11 runner-ups) ===
Result	W/L	Date	Tournament	Surface	Opponent	Score
Loss	0–1	Sep 1963	Ostordorf, West Germany	Clay	(West Germany) Harald Elschenbroich	0–6, 0–6
Win	1–1	Jan 1966	San José, Costa Rica	Clay	(Australia) Gary Penberthy	6–2, 6–2, 6–4
Loss	1–2	Jan 1967	Kalkutta, India	Grass	(Soviet Union) Alex Metreveli	3–6, 6–8, 4–6
Loss	1–3	Mar 1967	Cairo, Egypt	Clay	(Sweden) Jan-Erik Lundqvist	4–6, 4–6, 2–6
Win	2–3	Jan 1968	Bremen, West Germany	Hard (i)	(France) Daniel Contet	6–2, 6–2, 9–7
Loss	2–4	Mar 1968	Cairo, Egypt	Clay	(Czechoslovakia) Milan Holeček	6–4, 3–6, 1–6, 2–6
Loss	2–5	Mar 1968	Le Touquet, France	Clay	(France) François Jauffret	1–6, 2–6, 3–6
Loss	2–6	Feb 1969	Salisbury, U.S.	Hard (i)	(United States) Stan Smith	3–6, 8–6, 4–6, 4–6
Win	3–6	Mar 1969	Cairo, Egypt	Clay	(Hungary) István Gulyás	6–2, 6–2, 9–7
Loss	3–7	Mar 1969	Alexandria, Egypt	Clay	(Hungary) István Gulyás	1–6, 6–3, 3–6, 5–7
Loss	3–8	Oct 1969	Perth, UK	Carpet (i)	(United Kingdom) Mark Cox	6–3, 12–14, 1–6
Loss	3–9	Mar 1971	Cairo, Egypt	Clay	(Soviet Union) Alex Metreveli	6–8, 9–7, 4–6
Win	4–9	Mar 1973	Cairo, Egypt	Clay	(France) Patrick Proisy	6–4, 6–8, 6–3, 6–3
Win	5–9	Mar 1974	Cairo, Egypt	Clay	(France) François Jauffret	6–0, 4–6, 6–1, 6–3
Win	6–9	Nov 1974	Manila, Philippines	Hard	(West Germany) Hans-Jürgen Pohmann	7–6, 6–1
Loss	6–10	Aug 1975	Brummana, Lebanon	Clay	(Socialist Federal Republic of Yugoslavia) Nikola Pilić	6–7, 6–3, 6–7, 7–6, 4–6
Loss	6–11	Nov 1977	Taipei, Taiwan	Hard (i)	(United States) Tim Gullikson	7–6, 5–7, 6–7, 4–6

=== Doubles (9 titles, 18 runner-ups) ===
Result	W/L	Date	Tournament	Surface	Partner	Opponents	Score
Loss	0–1	Aug 1970	Boston, US	Hard	(Denmark) Torben Ulrich	(Australia) Roy Emerson (Australia) Rod Laver	1–6, 6–7
Loss	0–2	Sep 1972	Los Angeles, US	Hard	(New Zealand) Brian Fairlie	(United States) Pancho Gonzales (United States) Jimmy Connors	3–6, 6–4, 6–7
Loss	0–3	Oct 1972	Alamo WCT, US	Hard	(New Zealand) Brian Fairlie	(Netherlands) Tom Okker (United States) Marty Riessen	6–7, 4–6
Loss	0–4	Nov 1972	Gothenburg, Sweden	Carpet (i)	(New Zealand) Brian Fairlie	(Netherlands) Tom Okker (United States) Marty Riessen	2–6, 6–7
Loss	0–5	Mar 1973	Chicago, US	Carpet (i)	(New Zealand) Brian Fairlie	(Australia) Ken Rosewall (Australia) Fred Stolle	7–6, 4–6, 2–6
Loss	0–6	Apr 1973	Cleveland, US	Carpet (i)	(New Zealand) Brian Fairlie	(Australia) Ken Rosewall (Australia) Fred Stolle	2–6, 3–6
Loss	0–7	Aug 1973	Tanglewood, U.S.	Clay	(New Zealand) Brian Fairlie	(Australia) Bob Carmichael (South Africa) Frew McMillan	3–6, 4–6
Win	1–7	Apr 1974	St. Louis, U.S.	Clay	(New Zealand) Brian Fairlie	(Australia) Geoff Masters (Australia) Ross Case	7–6, 6–7, 7–6
Win	2–7	Oct 1974	Christchurch, New Zealand	N/A	(United States) Roscoe Tanner	(Australia) Syd Ball (Australia) Ray Ruffels	w/o
Win	3–7	Nov 1974	Jakarta, Indonesia	Hard	(United States) Roscoe Tanner	(West Germany) Jürgen Fassbender (West Germany) Hans-Jürgen Pohmann	7–5, 6–3
Loss	3–8	Jan 1975	Baltimore, U.S.	Carpet (i)	(South Africa) Frew McMillan	(Australia) Dick Crealy (Australia) Ray Ruffels	4–6, 3–6
Loss	3–9	Apr 1975	Charlotte, US	Clay	(New Zealand) Brian Fairlie	(Chile) Patricio Cornejo (Chile) Jaime Fillol	3–6, 7–5, 4–6
Loss	3–10	Mar 1976	Mexico City, Mexico	Clay	(New Zealand) Brian Fairlie	(United States) Brian Gottfried (Mexico) Raúl Ramírez	4–6, 6–7
Loss	3–11	Oct 1976	Brisbane, Australia	Grass	(New Zealand) Brian Fairlie	(Australia) Syd Ball (Australia) Kim Warwick	4–6, 4–6
Win	4–11	Oct 1976	Sydney, Australia	Hard (i)	(New Zealand) Brian Fairlie	(Australia) Syd Ball (Australia) Kim Warwick	7–5, 6–7, 7–6
Loss	4–12	Oct 1976	Perth, Australia	Hard	(Australia) Bob Carmichael	(United States) Dick Stockton (United States) Roscoe Tanner	7–6, 1–6, 2–6
Loss	4–13	Nov 1976	Tokyo, Japan	Clay	(New Zealand) Brian Fairlie	(Australia) Bob Carmichael (Australia) Ken Rosewall	4–6, 4–6
Win	5–13	Jul 1977	Newport, U.S.	Grass	(New Zealand) Brian Fairlie	(United States) Tim Gullikson (United States) Tom Gullikson	6–7, 6–3, 7–6
Win	6–13	Mar 1978	Cairo, Egypt	Clay	(New Zealand) Brian Fairlie	(Argentina) Lito Álvarez (United States) George Hardie	6–3, 7–5, 6–2
Loss	6–14	Jul 1978	Cincinnati, U.S.	Clay	(New Zealand) Brian Fairlie	(United States) Gene Mayer (Mexico) Raúl Ramírez	3–6, 3–6
Loss	6–15	Aug 1978	New Orleans, U.S.	Carpet (i)	(New Zealand) Brian Fairlie	(United States) Erik van Dillen (United States) Dick Stockton	6–7, 3–6
Loss	6–16	Mar 1979	Lagos, Nigeria	Hard	(Austria) Peter Feigl	(United States) Joel Bailey (United States) Bruce Kleege	4–6, 7–6, 3–6
Loss	6–17	Sep 1979	Palermo, Italy	Clay	(United Kingdom) John Feaver	(Australia) Peter McNamara (Australia) Paul McNamee	5–7, 6–7
Win	7–17	Mar 1980	Cairo, Egypt	Clay	(Netherlands) Tom Okker	(France) Christophe Freyss (France) Bernard Fritz	6–3, 3–6, 6–3
Win	8–17	Jul 1980	Gstaad, Switzerland	Clay	(United Kingdom) Colin Dowdeswell	(Australia) Mark Edmondson (Australia) Kim Warwick	6–4, 6–4
Win	9–17	Mar 1981	Cairo, Egypt	Clay	(Hungary) Balázs Taróczy	(Italy) Paolo Bertolucci (Italy) Gianni Ocleppo	6–7, 6–3, 6–1
Loss	9–18	Dec 1981	Sofia, Bulgaria	Carpet (i)	(United States) Rick Meyer	(East Germany) Thomas Emmrich (Czechoslovakia) Jiří Granát	6–7, 6–2, 4–6

== Grand Slam singles performance timeline ==
Won Wimbledon Championship for Boys 1964 & was runner-up in 1963

Key
W	F	SF	QF	#R	RR	Q#	DNQ	A	NH

(W) winner; (F) finalist; (SF) semifinalist; (QF) quarterfinalist; (#R) rounds 4, 3, 2, 1; (RR) round-robin stage; (Q#) qualification round; (DNQ) did not qualify; (A) absent; (NH) not held; (SR) strike rate (events won / competed); (W–L) win–loss record.

Tournament	1968	1969	1970	1971	1972	1973	1974	1975	1976	1977	1978	1979	1980	Career SR	Career W–L	Career win %
Australian Open	A	A	A	3R	A	A	A	A	A	A	1R	A	A	0 / 2	2–2	33.33
French Open	A	3R	A	A	A	1R	2R	1R	1R	2R	1R	A	A	0 / 7	4–7	36.36
Wimbledon	2R	1R	3R	1R	A	A	QF	2R	3R	1R	1R	1R	1R	0 / 11	10–11	47.61
US Open	A	3R	1R	1R	A	3R	4R	A	2R	A	A	A	A	0 / 6	8–6	53.33
Win–loss	1–1	4–3	2–2	2–3	0–0	2–2	8–3	1–2	3–3	1–2	0–3	0–1	0–1	0 / 26	24–26	48.00

== Davis Cup ==
El Shafei participated in 17 ties for Egypt, where he played 42 matches, winning 23, losing 19 he also served as team captain in the 1980s.
