= Thomas Emmrich =

East German tennis player

- Country (sports): East Germany
- Born: 21 July 1953 (age 73) Berlin, East Germany
- Plays: Right-handed

Singles
- Career record: 3–2
- Career titles: 0

Doubles
- Career record: 7–1
- Career titles: 1
Medal record
Representing East Germany
Summer Universiade
Silver medal – second place	1977 Sofia	Doubles

Thomas Emmrich (born 21 July 1953) is a former tennis player for East Germany. Between 1970 and 1988, Emmrich won 46 German Democratic Republic (GDR) titles (17 singles and 29 in the doubles and mixed). He entered the tennis scene after the GDR had decided to promote only those sports which were relevant for the Olympics’ medals table. Thus, he was barred from international competitions outside the Eastern bloc countries and had to keep the status as an amateur. However, he gained some points at an ATP tournament in Sofia as GDR functionaries had not noticed that it had become part of the ATP tour. After this tournament, the ATP ranked him number 482—the only entry of a GDR tennis player in the ATP rankings.

Martina Navratilova claimed that he could have become a top-ten player in the 1970s.

After the German reunification in 1990, Emmrich proved that he could compete on a high international level as he won several titles, i.e. runners-up in the European Championships of the 35+ Seniors (1996), runners-up in the Doubles World Championships in 2003 (50+), European Champion (50+) in 2006. In addition, he gained many national titles after 1990 in senior competitions.

His daughter Manuela Emmrich also picked up the tennis sport and played college tennis in the US. She won the National Championship in 2005. His son, Martin Emmrich, is a professional tennis player and is successful on the doubles pro circuit.

== Career finals ==
=== Doubles (1 win, 1 loss) ===
Result	W/L	Date	Tournament	Surface	Partner	Opponents	Score
Loss	0–1	Dec 1980	Sofia, Bulgaria	Carpet	(Soviet Union) Vadim Borisov	(West Germany) Hartmut Kirchhübel (Austria) Robert Reininger	6–4, 3–6, 4–6
Win	1–1	Dec 1981	Sofia, Bulgaria	Carpet	(Czechoslovakia) Jiří Granát	(Egypt) Ismail El Shafei (United States) Richard Meyer	7–6, 2–6, 6–4
