= Sofia Grand Prix =

Defunct tennis tournament
- Event name: Sofia Grand Prix
- Tour: Grand Prix circuit
- Founded: 1978
- Abolished: 1981
- Editions: 3
- Location: Sofia, Bulgaria
- Surface: Carpet

The Sofia Grand Prix was a men's indoor carpet court tennis tournament played in Sofia, Bulgaria as part of the ITF Grand Prix Circuit. It was first founded in 1978 as the Sofia International Indoor that event ran for one edition only. In 1980 it was revived as the Sofia Grand Prix which was staged until 1981. The successor indoor Bulgarian tournament to this is the current ATP Sofia Open

== Results ==
=== Singles ===
Year	Champions	Runners-up	Score
1978	(East Germany) Thomas Emmrich	(Soviet Union) Vadim Borisov	6–2, 6–4
1980	(Sweden) Per Hjertquist	(Soviet Union) Vadim Borisov	6–3, 6–2, 7–5
1981	(United States) Richard Meyer	(Finland) Leo Palin	6–4, 7–6, 7–6

=== Doubles ===
Year	Champions	Runners-up	Score
1980	(West Germany) Hartmut Kirchhübel (Austria) Robert Reininger	(Soviet Union) Vadim Borisov (East Germany) Thomas Emmrich	4–6, 6–3, 6–4
1981	(East Germany) Thomas Emmrich (Czechoslovakia) Jiří Granát	(Egypt) Ismail El Shafei (United States) Richard Meyer	7–6, 2–6, 6–4

== See also ==
- Vitosha New Otani Open – women's tournament (1988–1989)
