= Clifford Skakle =

American tennis player

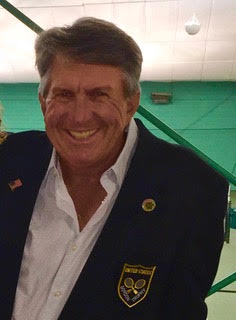
- Country (sports): United States
- Residence: Hamden, CT, USA
- Born: October 26, 1956 (age 69) Buxton, NC, USA
- Height: 6 ft 0 in (1.83 m)
- Turned pro: 1978
- Retired: 1982 (injury – from ATP/ITF competition)
- Plays: Right-handed (1-handed backhand)

Singles
- Career record: Unknown
- Career titles: 2
- Highest ranking: No. 244 (1981)

Doubles
- Career record: Unknown
- Career titles: 3
- Highest ranking: No. 201 (1981)

Clifford "Cliff" Skakle (born October 26, 1956) is a former professional tennis player from the United States. He was born in Buxton, North Carolina to Intercollegiate Tennis Association Hall of Fame Coach Don Skakle and Sybil Skakle. When Cliff was two, the family moved to Chapel Hill, North Carolina, where Don served as head coach of the men's tennis team at the University of North Carolina – Chapel Hill (UNC).

Prior to turning professional, Skakle played tennis for UNC, where he was the All-ACC Individual Flight Champion from 1974 to 1978. During that period, the UNC men's team won the ACC team championship every year. He completed his collegiate career with a singles record of 77–18 and doubles record of 96–9. Skakle's father Don was his coach for the entirety of his career.

== Career ==
Skakle turned pro in 1978, joining the ATP world tour. He played professionally for a year until he suffered an injury to his Achilles tendon in Strasbourg, France. He was then ruled ineligible for play in early 1979. He returned to the tour in March 1980, for an ATP event in Costa Rica, featuring a first round match up against the #1 player in the world, Jimmy Connors. Connors defeated Skakle 6–1, 6–2. Skakle competed for Country Club Aixois Aix-en-Provence in French InterClub in 1980 and 1981. Skakle's career featured notable matches against Jimmy Connors and Eliot Teltscher; and in doubles against Stan Smith/Bob Lutz at Wimbledon. Significant singles wins came against Ken Flach, Peter Doohan and Mike Cahill and in doubles against Danie Visser and Bob Lutz. In 1981, Skakle competed at Roland Garros (The French Open), Wimbledon, won the Dutch ITF pro circuit in singles and doubles, reached the quarter-finals in doubles at the Brussel's tournament, and competed in US Open Qualifying, where he broke his wrist prior to the main draw doubles competition. Skakle achieved a career-high ATP ranking of #244 in singles and #201 in doubles that year. After fracturing his wrist again, he retired after competing in US Open Qualifying in 1982.

== Post-retirement ==
Skakle returned to UNC to complete his degree, graduating in 1983. He returned to international competition in 1999 on the International Tennis Federation's Senior Men's Circuit. That year, he was ranked #3 in the world on the International Tennis Federation's Over40 rankings in singles. Additionally, he won ITF medallions in doubles in 1999 and 2000 in the World Championships held in Amsterdam and Buenos Aires, respectively. Skakle is a member of the United States International Club (USIC) and has often played for the United States in international competition, including the Gordon Trophy competition between the United States and Canada. Skakle was inducted in the North Carolina Tennis Hall of Fame in 2023, joining his Father as first ever Father/Son inductees.

Today, Cliff and his wife, Mavi Sánchez-Skakle, Head of Social Impact & Opportunity for USTA-New England, designed and opened the InFLOW®️Court in 2021, where he now strives to impact others in their pathway of Identity and HigherPerformance.
