= Jiří Granát =

Czech tennis player (born 1955)

- Country (sports): Czechoslovakia
- Residence: Zurich, Switzerland
- Born: 28 January 1955 (age 70) Prague
- Height: 1.85 m (6 ft 1 in)
- Plays: Right-handed

Singles
- Career record: 38–68
- Career titles: 0
- Highest ranking: No. 68 (6 Feb 1978)

Grand Slam singles results
- French Open: 3R (1979)
- Wimbledon: 1R (1977, 1978, 1982)
- US Open: 2R (1978)

Doubles
- Career record: 30–66
- Career titles: 1
- Highest ranking: No. 191 (3 Jan 1983)

Grand Slam doubles results
- French Open: 3R (1982)
- Wimbledon: 1R (1982)
- US Open: 3R (1982)

Jiří Granát (born 28 January 1955) is a former professional tennis player from the Czech Republic who competed for Czechoslovakia.

== Career ==
Granát took part in the main singles draw of nine Grand Slam tournaments during his career. He made the third round of the 1979 French Open, beating Jose Luis Damiani and then Francisco González. His only other Grand Slam third round appearances both came in 1982. He reached the third round of the men's doubles at the 1982 French Open (with Stanislav Birner) and 1982 US Open (with Erick Iskersky).

On the Grand Prix tennis circuit, Granát won one title, which was the doubles at the 1981 Sofia Open. His best singles performance came at the 1977 Scandinavian Covered Court Championships in Helsinki, where he was a semi-finalist. He had a win over Peter McNamara at Rotterdam in 1983, when the Australian was ranked seventh in the world.

Granát appeared in one Davis Cup tie for Czechoslovakia, in 1977, against Ireland. He played the doubles rubber, with Tomáš Šmíd. They defeated the Irish pairing of James McCardle and John O'Brien.

He defected to Switzerland in 1983 and worked for the Swiss Tennis Federation as a coach after retiring.

== Grand Prix career finals ==
=== Doubles: 1 (1–0) ===
Result	W/L	Date	Tournament	Surface	Partner	Opponents	Score
Win	1–0	Dec 1981	Sofia, Bulgaria	Carpet	(East Germany) Thomas Emmrich	(Egypt) Ismail El Shafei (United States) Richard Meyer	7–6, 2–6, 6–4
