= Rick Meyer =

American tennis player

- Country (sports): United States
- Born: 4 September 1955 (age 69); New York City, NY, US
- Height: 6 ft 0 in (1.83 m)
- Plays: Right-handed

Singles
- Career record: 42–78
- Career titles: 1
- Highest ranking: No. 83 (February 2, 1981)

Grand Slam singles results
- Australian Open: 4R (1981)
- French Open: 1R (1981)
- Wimbledon: 2R (1981)
- US Open: 3R (1980)

Doubles
- Career record: 71–117
- Career titles: 1
- Highest ranking: No. 103 (February 18, 1985)

Grand Slam doubles results
- Australian Open: 3R (1984)
- French Open: 3R (1981)
- Wimbledon: 2R (1981, 1982, 1984)
- US Open: 2R (1979, 1980, 1981, 1982, 1984)

Richard "Rick" Meyer (born September 4, 1955) is a former professional tennis player from the United States. During his career, he won one singles title and one doubles title.

== Career finals ==
=== Singles (1 win, 1 loss) ===
Result	W/L	Date	Tournament	Surface	Opponent	Score
Loss	0–1	Feb 1979	Sarasota, U.S.	Carpet (i)	(South Africa) Johan Kriek	6–7, 2–6
Win	1–1	Dec 1981	Sofia, Bulgaria	Carpet (i)	(Finland) Leo Palin	6–4, 7–6, 7–6

=== Doubles (1 win, 2 losses) ===
Result	W/L	Date	Tournament	Surface	Partner	Opponents	Score
Win	1–0	Mar 1981	Napa, U.S.	Hard	(United States) Chris Mayotte	(United States) Tracy Delatte (United States) John Hayes	6–3, 3–6, 7–6
Loss	1–1	Dec 1981	Sofia, Bulgaria	Carpet	(Egypt) Ismail El Shafei	(East Germany) Thomas Emmrich (Czechoslovakia) Jiří Granát	6–7, 6–2, 4–6
Loss	1–2	Nov 1982	Paris Indoor, France	Hard (i)	(United States) Jay Lapidus	(United States) Brian Gottfried (United States) Bruce Manson	4–6, 2–6
