= 1981 Wimbledon Championships =

- Date: 22 June – 4 July
- Edition: 95th
- Category: Grand Slam
- Draw: 128S/64D/48XD
- Prize money: £322,136
- Surface: Grass
- Location: Church Road; SW19, Wimbledon, London, United Kingdom
- Venue: All England Lawn Tennis and Croquet Club

Champions

Men's singles
- (United States) John McEnroe

Women's singles
- (United States) Chris Evert Lloyd

Men's doubles
- (United States) Peter Fleming / (United States) John McEnroe

Women's doubles
- (United States) Martina Navratilova / (United States) Pam Shriver

Mixed doubles
- (South Africa) Frew McMillan / (Netherlands) Betty Stöve

Boys' singles
- (United States) Matt Anger

Girls' singles
- (United States) Zina Garrison
- Wimbledon Championships

The 1981 Wimbledon Championships was a tennis tournament that took place on the outdoor grass courts at the All England Lawn Tennis and Croquet Club in Wimbledon, London, United Kingdom. The tournament ran from 22 June until 4 July. It was the 95th staging of the Wimbledon Championships, and the second Grand Slam tennis event of 1981.

For the first time since the 1965 tournament, there were no seeded British players in the singles draws.

== Prize money ==
The total prize money for 1981 championships was £322,136. The winner of the men's title earned £21,600 while the women's singles champion earned £19,440. However, the ladies champion was additionally presented with a diamond necklace, donated to the club, valued at £3,000.00, which technically made the ladies prize higher than the gentleman's for the only time in the championships history. The prize money for the men's singles champion was reduced by $1,500 when the All England Club imposed fines on John McEnroe for his on court behavior.

| Event | W | F | SF | QF | Round of 16 | Round of 32 | Round of 64 | Round of 128 |
| Men's singles | £21,600 | £10,800 | £5,400 | £2,700 | £1,730 | £920 | £540 | £325 |
| Women's singles | £19,440 | £9,450 | £4,725 | £2,160 | £1,345 | £745 | £420 | £250 |
| Men's doubles * | £9,070 | £4,540 | £2,270 | £1,140 | £620 | £200 | £100 | —N/a |
| Women's doubles * | £7,854 | £3,932 | £1,816 | £912 | £434 | £140 | £70 | —N/a |
| Mixed doubles * | £4,770 | £2,390 | £1,140 | £560 | £280 | £0 | £0 | —N/a |

_{* per team}

== Champions ==
=== Seniors ===
==== Men's singles ====
(United States) John McEnroe defeated (Sweden) Björn Borg, 4–6, 7–6^{(7–1)}, 7–6^{(7–4)}, 6–4

- It was McEnroe's 3rd career Grand Slam title and his 1st Wimbledon title.

==== Women's singles ====
(United States) Chris Evert Lloyd defeated (Czechoslovakia) Hana Mandlíková, 6–2, 6–2

- It was Evert-Lloyd's 12th career Grand Slam title and her third and last Wimbledon title.

==== Men's doubles ====
(United States) Peter Fleming / (United States) John McEnroe defeated (United States) Bob Lutz / (United States) Stan Smith, 6–4, 6–4, 6–4

- It was Fleming's 3rd career Grand Slam title and his 2nd Wimbledon title. It was McEnroe's 7th career Grand Slam title and his 3rd Wimbledon title.

==== Women's doubles ====
(United States) Martina Navratilova / (United States) Pam Shriver defeated (United States) Kathy Jordan / (United States) Anne Smith, 6–3, 7–6^{(8–6)}

- It was Navratilova's 11th career Grand Slam title and her 5th Wimbledon title. It was Shriver's 1st career Grand Slam title and her 1st Wimbledon title.

==== Mixed doubles ====
(South Africa) Frew McMillan / (Netherlands) Betty Stöve defeated (United States) John Austin / (United States) Tracy Austin, 4–6, 7–6^{(7–2)}, 6–3

- It was McMillan's 10th and last career Grand Slam title and his 5th Wimbledon title. It was Stöve's 10th and last career Grand Slam title and her 3rd Wimbledon title.

=== Juniors ===
==== Boys' singles ====
(United States) Matt Anger defeated (Australia) Pat Cash, 7–6^{(7–3)}, 7–5

==== Girls' singles ====
(United States) Zina Garrison defeated (South Africa) Rene Uys, 6–4, 3–6, 6–0

== Singles seeds ==
=== Men's singles ===
1. (Sweden) Björn Borg (final, lost to John McEnroe)
2. (United States) John McEnroe (champion)
3. (United States) Jimmy Connors (semifinals, lost to Björn Borg)
4. (Czechoslovakia) Ivan Lendl (first round, lost to Charlie Fancutt)
5. (United States) Gene Mayer (withdrew before the tournament began)
6. (United States) Brian Teacher (second round, lost to Vijay Amritraj)
7. (United States) Brian Gottfried (second round, lost to Jeff Borowiak)
8. (United States) Roscoe Tanner (second round, lost to Carlos Kirmayr)
9. (Argentina) José Luis Clerc (third round, lost to Paul Kronk)
10. (Argentina) Guillermo Vilas (first round, lost to Mark Edmondson)
11. (Paraguay) Víctor Pecci (first round, lost to Bill Scanlon)
12. (Australia) Peter McNamara (quarterfinals, lost to Björn Borg)
13. (France) Yannick Noah (first round, lost to Eric Fromm)
14. (Poland) Wojciech Fibak (fourth round, lost to Jimmy Connors)
15. (Hungary) Balázs Taróczy (third round, lost to Stan Smith)
16. (United States) Vitas Gerulaitis (fourth round, lost to Björn Borg)

=== Women's singles ===
1. (United States) Chris Evert Lloyd (champion)
2. (Czechoslovakia) Hana Mandlíková (final, lost to Chris Evert Lloyd)
3. (United States) Tracy Austin (quarterfinals, lost to Pam Shriver)
4. (United States) Martina Navratilova (semifinals, lost to Hana Mandlíková)
5. (United States) Andrea Jaeger (fourth round, lost to Mima Jaušovec)
6. (Australia) Wendy Turnbull (quarterfinals, lost to Hana Mandlíková)
7. (United States) Pam Shriver (semifinals, lost to Chris Evert Lloyd)
8. (Romania) Virginia Ruzici (quarterfinals, lost to Martina Navratilova)
9. (West Germany) Sylvia Hanika (first round, lost to Mary-Lou Piatek)
10. (Socialist Federal Republic of Yugoslavia) Mima Jaušovec (quarterfinals, lost to Chris Evert Lloyd)
11. (Australia) Dianne Fromholtz (third round, lost to Claudia Pasquale)
12. (United States) Kathy Jordan (fourth round, lost to Virginia Ruzici)
13. (West Germany) Bettina Bunge (second round, lost to Sue Barker)
14. (United States) Barbara Potter (fourth round, lost to Tracy Austin)
15. (Czechoslovakia) Regina Maršíková (first round, lost to Lucia Romanov)
16. (United States) JoAnne Russell (first round, lost to Pam Teeguarden)

| Preceded by 1981 French Open | Grand Slams | Succeeded by 1981 US Open |
