= 1977 US Open – Women's doubles =

Women's doubles
- 1977 US Open

Final
- Champions: (United States) Martina Navratilova (Netherlands) Betty Stöve
- Runners-up: (United States) Renée Richards (United States) Betty Ann Stuart
- Score: 6–1, 7–6

Events
Singles	men	women		boys	girls
Doubles	men	women	mixed	boys	girls
WC Singles	men	women	quad
WC Doubles	men	women	quad
Legends	men	women	mixed
← 1976 ·	US Open	· 1978 →

Linky Boshoff and Ilana Kloss were the defending champions, but lost in the second round to Mima Jaušovec and Virginia Ruzici.

Martina Navratilova and Betty Stöve won the title by defeating Renée Richards and Betty Ann Stuart 6–1, 7–6 in the final.

== Seeds ==
1. (United States) Martina Navratilova / (Netherlands) Betty Stöve (champions)
2. (South Africa) Linky Boshoff / (South Africa) Ilana Kloss (second round)
3. (Australia) Helen Cawley / (United States) JoAnne Russell (second round)
4. (France) Françoise Dürr / (United Kingdom) Virginia Wade (quarterfinals)
5. (United Kingdom) Lesley Charles / (United Kingdom) Sue Mappin (quarterfinals)
6. (Australia) Kerry Reid / (South Africa) Greer Stevens (semifinals)
7. (Czechoslovakia) Regina Maršíková / (United States) Pam Teeguarden (first round)
8. (United States) Mona Guerrant / (United States) Ann Kiyomura (first round)

== Draw ==
=== Key ===
- Q = Qualifier
- WC = Wild card
- LL = Lucky loser
- Alt = Alternate
- SE = Special exempt
- PR = Protected ranking
- ITF = ITF entry
- JE = Junior exempt
- w/o = Walkover
- r = Retired
- d = Defaulted
- SR = Special ranking

=== Finals ===
Quarterfinals
1	(United States) Martina Navratilova (Netherlands) Betty Stöve	6	7
(United States) Julie Anthony (United States) Billie Jean King	3	5
4	(France) Françoise Dürr (United Kingdom) Virginia Wade	2	2
6	(Australia) Kerry Reid (South Africa) Greer Stevens	6	6
5	(United Kingdom) Lesley Charles (United Kingdom) Sue Mappin	6	4
(United States) Renée Richards (United States) Betty Ann Stuart	7	6
(United States) Lele Forood (Argentina) Raquel Giscafré	6	7
(United States) Patricia Bostrom (United States) Mary Carillo	4	5

Semifinals
1	(United States) Martina Navratilova (Netherlands) Betty Stöve	6	6
6	(Australia) Kerry Reid (South Africa) Greer Stevens	4	4
(United States) Renée Richards (United States) Betty Ann Stuart	7	5	6
(United States) Lele Forood (Argentina) Raquel Giscafré	5	7	1

Final
1	(United States) Martina Navratilova (Netherlands) Betty Stöve	6	7
(United States) Renée Richards (United States) Betty Ann Stuart	1	6

=== Top half ===
==== Section 1 ====
First round
1	(United States) M Navratilova (Netherlands) B Stöve	6	6
(Sweden) H Anliot (Sweden) N Bohm	1	4
(Australia) C Matison (Australia) P Whytcross	6	7
(United States) C Reynolds (United States) S Tolleson	3	5
7	(Czechoslovakia) R Maršíková (United States) P Teeguarden	2	4
(United States) J Anthony (United States) BJ King	6	6
(South Africa) B Cuypers (South Africa) M Kruger	6	6
(United States) D Desfor (United States) G Galt	1	4

Second round
1	(United States) M Navratilova (Netherlands) B Stöve	7	6
(United States) T Holladay (United States) P Smith	5	4
(United States) T Austin (Australia) L Hunt	5	2
(Australia) C Matison (Australia) P Whytcross	7	6
(United States) J Anthony (United States) BJ King	6	6
(South Africa) T Harford (South Africa) Y Vermaak	0	1
(United States) J Stratton (Sweden) M Wikstedt	4	3
(South Africa) B Cuypers (South Africa) M Kruger	6	6

Third round
1	(United States) M Navratilova (Netherlands) B Stöve	6	4	6
(Australia) C Matison (Australia) P Whytcross	4	6	2
(United States) J Anthony (United States) BJ King	6	7
(South Africa) B Cuypers (South Africa) M Kruger	4	6

Quarterfinals
1	(United States) M Navratilova (Netherlands) B Stöve	6	7
(United States) J Anthony (United States) BJ King	3	5

==== Section 2 ====
First round
(Uruguay) F Bonicelli (United States) M Hamm	6	6
(Australia) S Saliba (Australia) M Sawyer	3	2
(Sweden) I Bentzer (Denmark) H Viragh	4	6	3
(West Germany) H Eisterlehner (United States) K Kuykendall	6	4	6
(United States) B Bruning (United States) S Walsh	6	6
(United States) R Casals (United States) L duPont	1	1
(United States) J Evert (Romania) M Simionescu	1	1
(Australia) C Doerner (Australia) W Turnbull	6	6

Second round
4	(France) F Dürr (United Kingdom) V Wade	6	6
(Uruguay) F Bonicelli (United States) M Hamm	3	3
(West Germany) H Eisterlehner (United States) K Kuykendall	7	3	6
(United States) K Shaw (United States) V Ziegenfuss	6	6	7
6	(Australia) K Reid (South Africa) G Stevens	7	7
(United States) B Bruning (United States) S Walsh	5	5
(Australia) C Doerner (Australia) W Turnbull	6	6
(United States) R Gerulaitis (United States) S Stap	3	1

Third round
4	(France) F Dürr (United Kingdom) V Wade	6	6
(United States) K Shaw (United States) V Ziegenfuss	4	1
6	(Australia) K Reid (South Africa) G Stevens	6	6
(Australia) C Doerner (Australia) W Turnbull	4	4

Quarterfinals
4	(France) F Dürr (United Kingdom) V Wade	2	2
6	(Australia) K Reid (South Africa) G Stevens	6	6

=== Bottom half ===
==== Section 3 ====
First round
(United States) C Baily (United States) P Michel	6	3
(United Kingdom) L Beaven (United States) K Harter	7	6
(Belgium) M Gurdal (Japan) N Sato	1	1
5	(United Kingdom) L Charles (United Kingdom) S Mappin	6	6
(New Zealand) P Elliott (United States) M Louie	4	1
(United States) K May (United States) W Overton	6	6
(United States) S Acker (United States) A Smith	6	6	7
(United Kingdom) G Coles (Romania) F Mihai	3	7	5

Second round
(Australia) D Fromholtz (United States) B Nagelsen	2	6	6
(United Kingdom) L Beaven (United States) K Harter	6	2	4
(Australia) N Gregory (United States) C-A Thomas	5	1
5	(United Kingdom) L Charles (United Kingdom) S Mappin	7	6
(United States) K May (United States) W Overton	2	6
(United States) R Richards (United States) BA Stuart	6	7
(United States) S Acker (United States) A Smith	7	7
3	(Australia) H Cawley (United States) J Russell	6	5

Third round
(Australia) D Fromholtz (United States) B Nagelsen	6	7	3
5	(United Kingdom) L Charles (United Kingdom) S Mappin	7	5	6
(United States) R Richards (United States) BA Stuart	5	6	7
(United States) S Acker (United States) A Smith	7	3	5

Quarterfinals
5	(United Kingdom) L Charles (United Kingdom) S Mappin	6	4
(United States) R Richards (United States) BA Stuart	7	6

==== Section 4 ====
First round
(United States) L Forood (Argentina) R Giscafré	6	6
(United States) R Khan (United States) N Weigel	0	4
(Italy) S Simmonds (United Kingdom) M Tyler	3	6	7
8	(United States) M Guerrant (United States) A Kiyomura	6	3	6
(United States) P Bostrom (United States) M Carillo	6	6
(United States) F Hutnick (United States) N Yeargin	3	2
(United States) P Louie (United States) S Margolin	0	4
2	(South Africa) L Boshoff (South Africa) I Kloss	6	6

Second round
(United States) R Fox (United States) L Thomas	5	6	6
(United States) L Forood (Argentina) R Giscafré	7	3	4
(United States) L Antonoplis (Australia) D Evers	6	6
(Italy) S Simmonds (United Kingdom) M Tyler	0	1
(United States) P Bostrom (United States) M Carillo	6	6
(United States) B Hallquist (United States) S McInerney	3	2
(Socialist Federal Republic of Yugoslavia) M Jaušovec (Romania) V Ruzici	6	3	6
2	(South Africa) L Boshoff (South Africa) I Kloss	4	6	4

Third round
(United States) L Forood (Argentina) R Giscafré	3	6	7
(United States) L Antonoplis (Australia) D Evers	6	2	5
(United States) P Bostrom (United States) M Carillo	6	7
(Socialist Federal Republic of Yugoslavia) M Jaušovec (Romania) V Ruzici	3	5

Quarterfinals
(United States) L Forood (Argentina) R Giscafré	6	7
(United States) P Bostrom (United States) M Carillo	4	5
