= 1977 US Open – Women's singles =

Women's singles
- 1977 US Open

Final
- Champion: (United States) Chris Evert
- Runner-up: (Australia) Wendy Turnbull
- Score: 7–6, 6–2

Details
- Draw: 96
- Seeds: 12

Events
Singles	men	women		boys	girls
Doubles	men	women	mixed	boys	girls
WC Singles	men	women	quad
WC Doubles	men	women	quad
Legends	men	women	mixed
← 1976 ·	US Open	· 1978 →

Two-time defending champion Chris Evert defeated Wendy Turnbull in the final, 7–6, 6–2 to win the women's singles tennis title at the 1977 US Open. It was her third US Open title and her seventh major singles title overall. For the second consecutive year, Evert did not lose a set during the tournament.

This was the third and last edition of the tournament to be held on clay courts, as it would switch to hardcourts the following year.

== Seeds ==
The seeded players are listed below. Chris Evert is the champion; others show the round in which they were eliminated.

1. (United States) Chris Evert (champion)
2. (United States) Martina Navratilova (semifinalist)
3. (United Kingdom) Virginia Wade (quarterfinalist)
4. (United Kingdom) Sue Barker (third round)
5. (Netherlands) Betty Stöve (semifinalist)
6. (United States) Rosie Casals (fourth round)
7. (United States) Billie Jean King (quarterfinalist)
8. (Australia) Dianne Fromholtz (fourth round)
9. (Australia) Kerry Reid (fourth round)
10. (Socialist Federal Republic of Yugoslavia) Mima Jaušovec (quarterfinalist)
11. (United States) Kristien Shaw (first round)
12. (Australia) Wendy Turnbull (finalist)

== Draw ==
=== Key ===
- Q = Qualifier
- WC = Wild card
- LL = Lucky loser
- Alt = Alternate
- ITF = ITF entry
- PR = Protected ranking
- SR = Special ranking
- SE = Special exempt
- JE = Junior exempt
- JR = Junior Accelerator Programme entrant
- CO = College Accelerator Programme entrant
- NG = Next Gen Accelerator Program entrant
- w/o = Walkover
- r = Retired
- d = Defaulted

=== Finals ===
Quarterfinals
1	(United States) Chris Evert	6	6
7	(United States) Billie Jean King	2	0
(United States) Tracy Austin	2	2
5	(Netherlands) Betty Stöve	6	6
12	(Australia) Wendy Turnbull	6	6
3	(United Kingdom) Virginia Wade	2	1
10	(Socialist Federal Republic of Yugoslavia) Mima Jaušovec	4	1
2	(United States) Martina Navratilova	6	6

Semifinals
1	(United States) Chris Evert	6	7
5	(Netherlands) Betty Stöve	3	5
12	(Australia) Wendy Turnbull	2	7	6
2	(United States) Martina Navratilova	6	5	4

Final
1	(United States) Chris Evert	7	6
12	(Australia) Wendy Turnbull	6	2

=== Earlier rounds ===
==== Section 1 ====
First round
1	(United States) Evert	6	6
(United States) Walsh	1	0
(Australia) Whytcross	2	6	7
(Sweden) Bohm	6	0	6
(Sweden) Anliot	7	6
(United States) Bruning	5	2
(Australia) Gourlay Cawley	6	6
(United States) Carillo	2	3
(United States) Richey	7	6
(United States) Struthers	6	0

Second round
1	(United States) Evert	6	6
(Australia) Whytcross	0	0
(Czechoslovakia) Maršíková	6	4	1
(Sweden) Anliot	2	6	6
(Australia) Hunt	7	3	6
(Australia) Gourlay Cawley	5	6	3
(United States) Richey	7	6
Q	(United States) Louie	6	2

Third round
1	(United States) Evert	6	6
(Sweden) Anliot	2	2
(Australia) Hunt	1	6
(United States) Richey	6	7

Fourth round
1	(United States) Evert	6	6
(United States) Richey	3	0

==== Section 2 ====
First round
(United States) Smith	7	6
(United States) Louie	5	4
(United States) Hallquist	6	6
(United Kingdom) Charles	4	4
9	(Australia) Reid	6	6
(United States) Stratton	2	3
(United States) Liess	6	0	6
(United States) Gerulaitis	3	6	4

Second round
7	(United States) King	6	3	7
(United States) Smith	3	6	5
Q	(United States) McInerney	7	6
(United States) Hallquist	5	0
9	(Australia) Reid	6	6
(United States) Evert	0	2
LL	(Australia) Saliba	3	3
(United States) Liess	6	6

Third round
7	(United States) King	6	2	6
Q	(United States) McInerney	1	6	1
9	(Australia) Reid	7	6
(United States) Liess	6	1

Fourth round
7	(United States) King	6	3	7
9	(Australia) Reid	1	6	6

==== Section 3 ====
First round
4	(United Kingdom) Barker	6	5	6
(West Germany) Ebbinghaus	4	7	3
(United States) Austin	3	6	6
(West Germany) Eisterlehner	6	3	1
(Romania) Ruzici	2	6	6
(Belgium) Gurdal	6	3	2
(United States) Reynolds	6	6
(United States) Thomas	4	2

Second round
4	(United Kingdom) Barker	6	4	6
(West Germany) Riedel	4	6	1
(United States) Austin	6	6
(United States) Ganz	1	2
(Brazil) Bueno	2	3
(Romania) Ruzici	6	6
(United States) Reynolds	2	1
(United States) Bostrom	6	6

Third round
4	(United Kingdom) Barker	1	4
(United States) Austin	6	6
(Romania) Ruzici	6	6
(United States) Bostrom	2	1

Fourth round
(United States) Austin	6	7
(Romania) Ruzici	3	5

==== Section 4 ====
First round
5	(Netherlands) Stöve	6	3	6
(United States) Antonoplis	3	6	2
(United States) Forood	3	6	7
(Denmark) Sparre	6	4	6
(Romania) Mihai	6	6
11	(United States) Kemmer Shaw	3	2
(United Kingdom) Beaven	6	6
(United States) Kiyomura	4	2

Second round
5	(Netherlands) Stöve	6	6
(South Africa) Kloss	4	1
(United States) duPont	6	6
(United States) Forood	4	4
(Romania) Mihai	2	6	6
(United States) Margolin	6	1	1
(United States) Kuykendall	6	6
(United Kingdom) Beaven	0	4

Third round
5	(Netherlands) Stöve	7	6
(United States) duPont	5	4
(Romania) Mihai	3	1
(United States) Kuykendall	6	6

Fourth round
5	(Netherlands) Stöve	6	6
(United States) Kuykendall	3	0

==== Section 5 ====
First round
(South Africa) Stevens	6	6
(United States) Latham	3	4
12	(Australia) Turnbull	6	6
(Italy) Simmonds	2	1
(South Africa) Cuypers	7	6	6
Q	(United States) Stoll	5	7	2
6	(United States) Casals	2	6	6
(United States) Nagelsen	6	4	3

Second round
(South Africa) Stevens	4	4
Q	(United States) Jordan	6	6
(Australia) Doerner	0	2
12	(Australia) Turnbull	6	6
Q	(New Zealand) Elliott	2	3
(South Africa) Cuypers	6	6
(United States) Teeguarden	3	6
6	(United States) Casals	6	7

Third round
Q	(United States) Jordan	4	3
12	(Australia) Turnbull	6	6
(South Africa) Cuypers	2	6	2
6	(United States) Casals	6	1	6

Fourth round
12	(Australia) Turnbull	4	6	6
6	(United States) Casals	6	0	0

==== Section 6 ====
First round
(United States) Russell	7	6
(France) Lovera	5	4
(United States) Guerrant	7	2	6
(South Africa) Vermaak	6	6	1
(United States) Fox	6	6
(Sweden) Wikstedt	4	3
3	(United Kingdom) Wade	6	6
(United States) Richards	1	4

Second round
(United States) Holladay	2	6	1
(United States) Russell	6	3	6
(United States) Guerrant	6	4	7
(United States) Overton	0	6	5
(United States) Fox	3	4
(Uruguay) Bonicelli	6	6
Q	(United States) Riley	4	0
3	(United Kingdom) Wade	6	6

Third round
(United States) Russell	7	3	1
(United States) Guerrant	5	6	6
(Uruguay) Bonicelli	6	1	2
3	(United Kingdom) Wade	4	6	6

Fourth round
(United States) Guerrant	5	4
3	(United Kingdom) Wade	7	6

==== Section 7 ====
First round
(United States) Newberry	6	6
(United States) Baily	1	0
10	(Socialist Federal Republic of Yugoslavia) Jaušovec	6	6
(France) Dürr	3	1
(United Kingdom) Tyler	6	2
(United States) May	4	0	r
8	(Australia) Fromholtz	6	6
(South Africa) Boshoff	1	4

Second round
(United States) Newberry	6	7
(Czechoslovakia) Tomanová	4	6
(Sweden) Bentzer	1	1
10	(Socialist Federal Republic of Yugoslavia) Jaušovec	6	6
Q	(United States) Harris	2	4
(United Kingdom) Tyler	6	6
(United States) Anthony	3	2
8	(Australia) Fromholtz	6	6

Third round
(United States) Newberry	1	2
10	(Socialist Federal Republic of Yugoslavia) Jaušovec	6	6
(United Kingdom) Tyler	2	3
8	(Australia) Fromholtz	6	6

Fourth round
10	(Socialist Federal Republic of Yugoslavia) Jaušovec	6	6
8	(Australia) Fromholtz	3	2

==== Section 8 ====
First round
(United Kingdom) Coles	1	6	7
(United States) Penn	6	2	5
Q	(United States) Michel	6	6
(United States) Ziegenfuss	4	3
(Australia) Evers	6	6
(United Kingdom) Mappin	4	2
2	(United States) Navratilova	6	6
(United States) Hamm	0	1

Second round
(United Kingdom) Coles	7	4	5
(United States) Harter	5	6	7
(South Africa) Kruger	6	6
Q	(United States) Michel	2	2
(South Africa) Harford	6	6
(Australia) Evers	4	2
(United States) Meyer	4	1
2	(United States) Navratilova	6	6

Third round
(United States) Harter	0	0
(South Africa) Kruger	6	6
(South Africa) Harford	0	2
2	(United States) Navratilova	6	6

Fourth round
(South Africa) Kruger	2	1
2	(United States) Navratilova	6	6

Preceded by 1977 Wimbledon Championships – Women's singles	Grand Slam women's singles	Succeeded by 1977 Australian Open (December) – Women's singles
