= Tulsa Invitation =

Defunct tennis tournament
- Tour: ILTF World Circuit (1958–69) men (1958–70) women ILTF Independent Circuit (1970–75) men (1973–75) women
- Founded: 1958; 67 years ago
- Abolished: 1975; 50 years ago
- Location: Tulsa, Oklahoma United States
- Venue: Tulsa Tennis Club
- Surface: Clay / outdoor

The Tulsa Invitation also known as the TTC Invitational was a men's and women's clay court tennis tournament was founded in 1958. The tournament was played at the Tulsa Tennis Club, Tulsa, Oklahoma, United States. It played annually through till 1975 when it was discontinued.

== History ==
In 1935 a Tulsa Invitation tournament was held, however that tournament appears to have been discontinued. In 1958 the Tulsa Tennis Club (founded 1926) as a private members club staged the Tulsa Invitation tennis tournament for the first time. The first men's singles winner was Sammy Giammalva who defeated Bernard Bartzen. the event was held annually until 1975 when it was discontinued the final men's singles title went to Zan Guerry for the third time, and the women's singles event was won by Lele Forood. The tournament was part of the ILTF World Circuit from 1958 to 1969 for men and to 1970 for women. It then became part of the ILTF Independent Circuit from 1970 to 1975 for men, and 1973 to 1975 for women that tour included tournaments not part of ILTF Grand Prix or WTA Tour.

== Finals ==
=== Men's singles ===
Year	Winners	Runners-up	Score
1958	(United States) Sam Giammalva	(United States) Bernard Bartzen	2–6, 6–4, 9–7, 7–5.
1959	(United States) Ham Richardson	(United States) Bernard Bartzen	6–3, 6–4.
1960	(United States) Bernard Bartzen	(United States) Butch Buchholz	8–6, 6–1.
1961	(United States) Bernard Bartzen (2)	(United States) Chuck McKinley	6–0, 4–6, 8–6.
1962	(United States) Ham Richardson (2)	(United States) Chuck McKinley	6–3, 1–6, 8–6.
1963	(United States) Frank Froehling III	(United States) Chuck McKinley	6–4, 6–4.
1964	(United States) Chuck McKinley	(United States) Ham Richardson	8–6, 6–4.
1965	(United States) Ham Richardson (3)	(United States) Clark Graebner	6–4, 6–4.
1966	(United States) Vic Seixas	(United States) John Pickens	6–3, 6–4.
1967	(United States) Cliff Richey	(United States) Clark Graebner	6–2, 6–1.
1968	(South Africa) Peter van Lingen	(Mexico) Joaquín Loyo-Mayo	7–5, 6–2.
↓ Open era ↓
1969	(Brazil) Thomaz Koch	(Mexico) Vicente Zarazúa	6–2, 8–6.
1970	(New Zealand) Brian Fairlie	(United States) Tom Edlefsen	6–2, 4–6, 6–1.
1971	(United States) Harold Solomon	(United States) Zan Guerry	3–6, 6–3, 6–4.
1972	(United States) Dick Stockton	(United States) Eddie Dibbs	7–5, 3–6, 6–2.
1973	(United States) Zan Guerry	(United States) Billy Martin	7–5, 6–3.
1974	(United States) Zan Guerry (2)	(United States) Scott Martin	4–6, 6–2, 7–5.
1975	(United States) Zan Guerry (3)	(United States) Dick Stockton	6–1, 6–7, 6–2.

=== Women's singles ===
(incomplete roll)

Year	Winners	Runners-up	Score
1961	(United States) Karen Hantze	(United States) Nancy Richey	9–7, 4–6, 6–3
1962	(United States) Patsy Rippy	(United States) Donna Holden	4–6, 6–3, 6–1
1963	(Mexico) Yola Ramirez Ochoa	(United States) Nancy Richey	4–6, 6–0, 6–1
1964	(Mexico) Yola Ramirez Ochoa (2)	(United States) Justina Bricka	7–5, 4–6, 6–3
1965	(United States) Carole Graebner	(Mexico) Yola Ramirez Ochoa	5–7, 6–3, 6–1
1966	(United States) Billie Jean Moffitt King	(United States) Carol Hanks Aucamp	6–0, 6–1
1967	(United States) Nancy Richey	(United States) Carole Graebner	6–2, 6–3
1968	(United States) Betty Ann Grubb	(United States) Stephanie Grant	6–3, 6–1
↓ Open era ↓
1969	(United States) Betty Ann Grubb (2)	(United States) Victoria Rogers	6–1, 6–1
1970	(United States) Stephanie DeFina	(United States) Janet Newberry	6–1, 6–4
1971	(United States) Chris Evert	(United States) Mary Ann Curtis	6–0, 6–3
1972	(United States) Laurie Fleming	(United States) Kathy Kraft	6–4, 6–2
1973	(United States) Jeanne Evert	(United States) Janice Metcalf	7–6, 6–1
1974	(United States) JoAnne Russell	(United States) Mary Hamm	6–4, 6–7, 6–4
1975	(United States) Lele Forood	(United States) Mary Hamm	6–3, 6–3

== See also ==
- Tulsa Grand Prix Tennis Tournament (a hard court men's tournament played from 1978 to 1980).
