= 1983 Virginia Slims of Atlanta – Doubles =

Doubles
- 1983 Virginia Slims of Atlanta

Final
- Champions: (United States) Alycia Moulton (United States) Sharon Walsh
- Runners-up: (United States) Rosemary Casals (Australia) Wendy Turnbull
- Score: 6–3, 7–6

Details
- Draw: 16
- Seeds: 4

Events
Singles	Doubles
← 1982 ·	Virginia Slims of Atlanta

The women's doubles Tournament at the 1983 Virginia Slims of Atlanta took place between April 25 and May 1 on outdoor hard courts in Atlanta, United States. Alycia Moulton and Sharon Walsh won the title, defeating Rosemary Casals and Wendy Turnbull in the final.

== Seeds ==
1. (United States) Kathy Jordan / (United States) Anne Smith (semifinals)
2. (United States) Rosemary Casals / (Australia) Wendy Turnbull (final)
3. (United States) Leslie Allen / (United States) Pam Shriver (quarterfinals)
4. (United States) Ann Kiyomura / (United States) Paula Smith (first round)

== Draw ==
=== Key ===
- Q = Qualifier
- WC = Wild card
- LL = Lucky loser
- Alt = Alternate
- SE = Special exempt
- PR = Protected ranking
- ITF = ITF entry
- JE = Junior exempt
- w/o = Walkover
- r = Retired
- d = Defaulted
- SR = Special ranking

First round
1	(United States) K Jordan (United States) A Smith	6	6
(United States) L DuPont (United States) A Henricksson	3	4
(United States) S Acker (United States) L Forood	3	6	6
(United States) B Jordan (Australia) B Remilton	6	3	4
4	(United States) A Kiyomura (United States) P Smith	1	0
(United States) A Moulton (United States) S Walsh	6	6
(Australia) C O'Neil (Australia) A Tobin	6	1	6
(United States) W White (United States) N Yeargin	3	6	3
(United States) B Hallquist (United States) A White	4	6	6
(United States) J Preyer (United States) K Steinmetz	6	3	3
(United States) A Leand (United States) ML Piatek	3	1
3	(United States) L Allen (United States) P Shriver	6	6
(United States) B Bruning (United States) J Davis	7	7
(United States) S Margolin (United States) K Shaefer	5	5
(United States) AM Fernandez (United States) T Holladay	4	3
2	(United States) R Casals (Australia) W Turnbull	6	6

Quarterfinals
1	(United States) K Jordan (United States) A Smith	6	6
(United States) S Acker (United States) L Forood	1	3
(United States) A Moulton (United States) S Walsh	6	6
(Australia) C O'Neil (Australia) A Tobin	1	2
(United States) B Hallquist (United States) A White	6	5	6
3	(United States) L Allen (United States) P Shriver	4	7	4
(United States) B Bruning (United States) J Davis
2	(United States) R Casals (Australia) W Turnbull	w/o

Semifinals
1	(United States) K Jordan (United States) A Smith	6	3
(United States) A Moulton (United States) S Walsh	7	6
(United States) B Hallquist (United States) A White	6	4	3
2	(United States) R Casals (Australia) W Turnbull	4	6	6

Final
(United States) A Moulton (United States) S Walsh	6	7
2	(United States) R Casals (Australia) W Turnbull	3	6
