= 1983 Virginia Slims of Atlanta – Singles =

Singles
- 1983 Virginia Slims of Atlanta

Final
- Champion: (United States) Pam Shriver
- Runner-up: (United States) Kathy Jordan
- Score: 6–2, 6–0

Details
- Draw: 32
- Seeds: 8

Events
Singles	Doubles
← 1982 ·	Virginia Slims of Atlanta

The singles Tournament at the 1983 Virginia Slims of Atlanta took place between April 25 and May 1 on outdoor hard courts in Atlanta, United States. Pam Shriver won the title, defeating Kathy Jordan in the final.

== Draw ==
=== Key ===
- Q = Qualifier
- WC = Wild card
- LL = Lucky loser
- Alt = Alternate
- SE = Special exempt
- PR = Protected ranking
- ITF = ITF entry
- JE = Junior exempt
- w/o = Walkover
- r = Retired
- d = Defaulted
- SR = Special ranking

=== Finals ===
Semifinals
6	(United States) Kathy Jordan	7	6
(United States) Anne White	5	4
3	(Australia) Wendy Turnbull	4	6	3
2	(United States) Pam Shriver	6	4	6

Finals
6	(United States) Kathy Jordan	2	0
2	(United States) Pam Shriver	6	6

=== Top half ===
First round
LL	(United States) L Forood	6	6
(United States) R Casals	4	3
(United States) ML Piatek	6	3	6
(United States) S Acker	0	6	0
(United States) S Walsh	7	6
(United States) LA Thompson	5	1
(United States) C Benjamin	2	3
6	(United States) K Jordan	6	6
4	(United States) B Potter	4	6	2
(United States) T Phelps	6	4	6
Q	(United States) K Steinmetz	6	6
(United States) B Norton	1	1
LL	(Australia) C O'Neil	6	2
(United States) A White	7	6
(United States) V Nelson	6	6
8	(United States) W White	4	2

Second round
LL	(United States) L Forood	6	6
(United States) ML Piatek	4	2
(United States) S Walsh	5	6	4
6	(United States) K Jordan	7	1	6
(United States) T Phelps	2	3
Q	(United States) K Steinmetz	6	6
(United States) A White	7	6
5	(United States) V Nelson	6	4

Quarterfinals
LL	(United States) L Forood	2	5
6	(United States) K Jordan	6	7
Q	(United States) K Steinmetz	3	2
(United States) A White	6	6

Semifinals
6	(United States) K Jordan	7	6
(United States) A White	5	4

=== Bottom half ===
First round
5	(United States) A Smith	6	6
(United States) D Gilbert	2	3
(United States) A Moulton	6	2	6
Q	(Australia) A Tobin	4	6	4
(United States) S Mascarin	6	7
(United States) AM Fernandez	3	5
(United States) L Allen	6	1	3
3	(Australia) W Turnbull	4	6	6
7	(United States) A Leand	6	6
(United States) B Hallquist	1	1
(United States) K Shaefer	6	2
Q	(United States) H Ludloff	7	6
(United States) A Kiyomura	6	6
Q	(United States) J Davis	2	2
(United States) N Yeargin	3	0
2	(United States) P Shriver	6	6

Second round
5	(United States) A Smith	6	6
(United States) A Moulton	4	4
(United States) S Mascarin	0	5
3	(Australia) W Turnbull	6	7
7	(United States) A Leand	6	7
Q	(United States) H Ludloff	2	5
(United States) A Kiyomura
2	(United States) P Shriver	w/o

Quarterfinals
5	(United States) A Smith	4	2
3	(Australia) W Turnbull	6	6
7	(United States) A Leand	1	0
2	(United States) P Shriver	6	6

Semifinals
3	(Australia) W Turnbull	4	6	3
2	(United States) P Shriver	6	4	6
