= 1977 US Open – Mixed doubles =

Mixed doubles
- 1977 US Open

Final
- Champions: (South Africa) Frew McMillan (Netherlands) Betty Stöve
- Runners-up: (United States) Vitas Gerulaitis (United States) Billie Jean King
- Score: 6–2, 3–6, 6–3

Details
- Draw: 32
- Seeds: 8

Events
Singles	men	women		boys	girls
Doubles	men	women	mixed	boys	girls
WC Singles	men	women	quad
WC Doubles	men	women	quad
Legends	men	women	mixed
- US Open

Phil Dent and Billie Jean King were the defending champions but only Billie Jean King competed that year with Vitas Gerulaitis. Vitas Gerulaitis and Billie Jean King lost in the final 6–2, 3–6, 6–3 against Frew McMillan and Betty Stöve.

== Seeds ==
1. (Australia) Bob Hewitt / (South Africa) Greer Stevens (semifinals)
2. (South Africa) Frew McMillan / (Netherlands) Betty Stöve (champions)
3. (United States) Vitas Gerulaitis / (United States) Billie Jean King (final)
4. (United States) Marty Riessen / (France) Françoise Dürr (first round)

== Draw ==
Key

- Q = Qualifier
- WC = Wild card
- LL = Lucky loser
- Alt = Alternate
- ITF = ITF entry
- PR = Protected ranking
- SR = Special ranking
- SE = Special exempt
- JE = Junior exempt
- JR = Junior Accelerator Programme entrant
- CO = College Accelerator Programme entrant
- NG = Next Gen Accelerator Program entrant
- w/o = Walkover
- r = Retired
- d = Defaulted

=== Finals ===
Semifinals
1	(Australia) Bob Hewitt (South Africa) Greer Stevens	6	3	6
3	(United States) Vitas Gerulaitis (United States) Billie Jean King	4	6	7
(United States) Butch Walts (United States) Kristien Shaw	5	6	3
2	(South Africa) Frew McMillan (Netherlands) Betty Stöve	7	3	6

Final
3	(United States) Vitas Gerulaitis (United States) Billie Jean King	2	6	3
2	(South Africa) Frew McMillan (Netherlands) Betty Stöve	6	3	6

=== Top half ===
First round
1	(Australia) B Hewitt (South Africa) G Stevens	6	6
(Australia) N Fraser (Australia) L Hunt	1	0
(United States) A Neely (United States) C Baily	6	4	1
(Australia) B Carmichael (United States) P Teeguarden	3	6	6
(United States) W Maze (United States) L Forood	2	7	0
(United States) J Austin (United States) T Austin	6	5	6
(Australia) P Kronk (Australia) P Whytcross	6	3
(United States) F McNair (United States) J Russell	7	6
3	(United States) V Gerulaitis (United States) BJ King	6	6
(United States) K Stuart (United States) BA Stuart	2	1
(United Kingdom) J Feaver (Romania) V Ruzici	6	7
(United States) R Fagel (Sweden) H Anliot	3	5
(United States) T Waltke (United States) S Margolin	4	2
(United States) R Reid (Australia) K Reid	6	6
(United States) V Amaya (United States) C Meyer	6	4
(Australia) R Case (United States) M Guerrant	7	6

Second round
1	(Australia) B Hewitt (South Africa) G Stevens	7	6
(Australia) B Carmichael (United States) P Teeguarden	6	1
(United States) J Austin (United States) T Austin	4	4
(United States) F McNair (United States) J Russell	6	6
3	(United States) V Gerulaitis (United States) BJ King	6	6
(United Kingdom) J Feaver (Romania) V Ruzici	1	2
(United States) R Reid (Australia) K Reid	4	4
(Australia) R Case (United States) M Guerrant	6	6

Quarterfinals
1	(Australia) B Hewitt (South Africa) G Stevens	6	6
(United States) F McNair (United States) J Russell	4	0
3	(United States) V Gerulaitis (United States) BJ King	4	7	6
(Australia) R Case (United States) M Guerrant	6	5	3

Semifinals
1	(Australia) B Hewitt (South Africa) G Stevens	6	3	6
3	(United States) V Gerulaitis (United States) BJ King	4	6	7

=== Bottom half ===
First round
(Sweden) J Norbäck (Sweden) N Bohm	3	4
(Australia) J Marks (Australia) W Turnbull	6	6
(United States) B Walts (United States) K Shaw	4	6	6
(South Africa) W Prinsloo (South Africa) Y Vermaak	6	2	1
(United States) J McEnroe (United States) M Carillo	5	6	4
(Australia) C Kachel (South Africa) I Kloss	7	3	6
(United States) D Ralston (United States) R Casals	7	6
4	(United States) M Riessen (France) F Dürr	6	3
(United States) J Delaney (United States) P Bostrom	6	5	3
(United States) G Hardie (United States) B Nagelsen	3	7	6
(United States) B Teacher (United States) K May	6	7
(United States) M Machette (United States) S Walsh	2	6
(United States) V Winitsky (United States) R Fox	6	6
(Australia) M Edmondson (United States) A Kiyomura	2	2
(Australia) C Letcher (Australia) D Evers	5	4
2	(South Africa) F McMillan (Netherlands) B Stöve	7	6

Second round
(Australia) J Marks (Australia) W Turnbull	6	6	2
(United States) B Walts (United States) K Shaw	4	7	6
(Australia) C Kachel (South Africa) I Kloss	6	6
(United States) D Ralston (United States) R Casals	7	7
(United States) G Hardie (United States) B Nagelsen	5	7	4
(United States) B Teacher (United States) K May	7	5	6
(United States) V Winitsky (United States) R Fox	4	3
2	(South Africa) F McMillan (Netherlands) B Stöve	6	6

Quarterfinals
(United States) B Walts (United States) K Shaw	6	6
(United States) D Ralston (United States) R Casals	3	4
(United States) B Teacher (United States) K May	5	2
2	(South Africa) F McMillan (Netherlands) B Stöve	7	6

Semifinals
(United States) B Walts (United States) K Shaw	5	6	3
2	(South Africa) F McMillan (Netherlands) B Stöve	7	3	6
