= 1977 US Open – Men's doubles =

Men's doubles
- 1977 US Open

Final
- Champion: (South Africa) Bob Hewitt (South Africa) Frew McMillan
- Runner-up: (United States) Brian Gottfried (Mexico) Raúl Ramírez
- Score: 6–4, 6–0

Details
- Draw: 64
- Seeds: 16

Events
Singles	men	women		boys	girls
Doubles	men	women	mixed	boys	girls
WC Singles	men	women	quad
WC Doubles	men	women	quad
Legends	men	women	mixed
← 1976 ·	US Open	· 1978 →

Tom Okker and Marty Riessen were the defending champions but lost in the quarterfinals to Syd Ball and Kim Warwick.

Bob Hewitt and Frew McMillan won in the final 6–4, 6–0 against Brian Gottfried and Raúl Ramírez.

== Seeds ==
1. (South Africa) Bob Hewitt / (South Africa) Frew McMillan (champions)
2. (United States) Brian Gottfried / (Mexico) Raúl Ramírez (final)
3. (Netherlands) Tom Okker / (United States) Marty Riessen (quarterfinals)
4. (United States) Bob Lutz / (United States) Stan Smith (quarterfinals)
5. (Poland) Wojtek Fibak / (United States) Dick Stockton (second round)
6. (Australia) John Alexander / (Australia) Phil Dent (first round)
7. (United States) Fred McNair / (United States) Sherwood Stewart (third round)
8. n.a.
9. (Australia) Syd Ball / (Australia) Kim Warwick (semifinals)
10. (Australia) Paul Kronk / (Australia) Cliff Letcher (quarterfinals)
11. (India) Anand Amritraj / (India) Vijay Amritraj (third round)
12. (Australia) Colin Dibley / (Australia) Chris Kachel (third round)
13. (United Kingdom) David Lloyd / (United Kingdom) John Lloyd (first round)
14. (Australia) Mark Edmondson / (Australia) John Marks (second round)
15. (United States) Henry Pfister / (United States) Butch Walts (third round)
16. (Chile) Hans Gildemeister / (Chile) Belus Prajoux (third round)

== Draw ==
=== Key ===
- Q = Qualifier
- WC = Wild card
- LL = Lucky loser
- Alt = Alternate
- ITF = ITF entry
- PR = Protected ranking
- SR = Special ranking
- SE = Special exempt
- JE = Junior exempt
- JR = Junior Accelerator Programme entrant
- CO = College Accelerator Programme entrant
- NG = Next Gen Accelerator Program entrant
- w/o = Walkover
- r = Retired
- d = Defaulted

=== Finals ===
Quarterfinals
1	(South Africa) Bob Hewitt (South Africa) Frew McMillan	6	6
10	(Australia) Paul Kronk (Australia) Cliff Letcher	4	2
4	(United States) Bob Lutz (United States) Stan Smith	4	6
(Australia) Bob Carmichael (United States) Brian Teacher	6	7
9	(Australia) Syd Ball (Australia) Kim Warwick	7	6
3	(Netherlands) Tom Okker (United States) Marty Riessen	6	1
(Chile) Álvaro Fillol (Chile) Jaime Fillol	3	4
2	(United States) Brian Gottfried (Mexico) Raúl Ramírez	6	6

Semifinals
1	(South Africa) Bob Hewitt (South Africa) Frew McMillan	6	4	6
(Australia) Bob Carmichael (United States) Brian Teacher	2	6	3
9	(Australia) Syd Ball (Australia) Kim Warwick	4	1
2	(United States) Brian Gottfried (Mexico) Raúl Ramírez	6	6

Final
1	(South Africa) Bob Hewitt (South Africa) Frew McMillan	6	6
2	(United States) Brian Gottfried (Mexico) Raúl Ramírez	4	0

=== Top half ===
==== Section 1 ====
First round
1	(South Africa) B Hewitt (South Africa) F McMillan	6	6
(Canada) R Genois (United States) G Oropez	2	1
(United States) W Maze (United States) B Nichols	2	6	4
(United States) M Fishbach (South Africa) D Schneider	6	4	6
15	(United States) H Pfister (United States) B Walts	7	6
(Australia) R Case (Australia) J Newcombe	5	4
(United States) J Delaney (India) S Menon	6	6
(United States) B Manson (United States) T Waltke	2	2
7	(United States) F McNair (United States) S Stewart	6	6
(United States) W Cashman (United States) W Drake	3	3
(United States) G Hardie (New Zealand) R Simpson	6	6
(United States) R Fagel (United States) C Graebner	4	3
10	(Australia) P Kronk (Australia) C Letcher	4	6	6
(United States) C Pasarell (United States) D Ralston	6	3	2
(United States) H Hoyt (Australia) W Lloyd	6	5	6
(United States) Jeff Austin (United States) John Austin	4	7	7

Second round
1	(South Africa) B Hewitt (South Africa) F McMillan	6	6
(United States) M Fishbach (South Africa) D Schneider	4	2
15	(United States) H Pfister (United States) B Walts	7	7
(United States) J Delaney (India) S Menon	6	6
7	(United States) F McNair (United States) S Stewart	6	6
(United States) G Hardie (New Zealand) R Simpson	4	3
10	(Australia) P Kronk (Australia) C Letcher	6	7
(United States) Jeff Austin (United States) John Austin	4	6

Third round
1	(South Africa) B Hewitt (South Africa) F McMillan	7	3	6
15	(United States) H Pfister (United States) B Walts	6	6	3
7	(United States) F McNair (United States) S Stewart	6	3	2
10	(Australia) P Kronk (Australia) C Letcher	2	6	6

Quarterfinals
1	(South Africa) B Hewitt (South Africa) F McMillan	6	6
10	(Australia) P Kronk (Australia) C Letcher	4	2

==== Section 2 ====
First round
4	(United States) B Lutz (United States) S Smith	7	7
(Paraguay) V Pecci (Spain) M Santana	6	6
(United States) E Teltscher (United States) V Winitsky	6	6
(South Africa) P Lamb (South Africa) R Moore	4	3
12	(Australia) C Dibley (Australia) C Kachel	6	6
(Venezuela) J Andrew (Bolivia) R Benavides	4	1
(Sweden) J Norbäck (Sweden) D Palm	6	2
(United States) S Krulevitz (South Africa) J Yuill	7	6
5	(Poland) W Fibak (United States) D Stockton	6	6	6
(Czechoslovakia) J Kodeš (Czechoslovakia) T Šmíd	3	7	3
(United States) Z Guerry (United States) J Ross	4	6	1
(Australia) B Carmichael (United States) B Teacher	6	3	6
13	(United Kingdom) D Lloyd (United Kingdom) J Lloyd	4	6	6
(Paraguay) F González (Ecuador) R Ycaza	6	4	7
(United Kingdom) J Feaver (Australia) J James	7	3	6
(United States) E Friedler (United States) J Karzen	5	6	4

Second round
4	(United States) B Lutz (United States) S Smith	6	6
(United States) E Teltscher (United States) V Winitsky	2	2
12	(Australia) C Dibley (Australia) C Kachel	6	6
(United States) S Krulevitz (South Africa) J Yuill	3	3
5	(Poland) W Fibak (United States) D Stockton	6	2
(Australia) B Carmichael (United States) B Teacher	7	6
(Paraguay) F González (Ecuador) R Ycaza	5	7	6
(United Kingdom) J Feaver (Australia) J James	7	6	7

Third round
4	(United States) B Lutz (United States) S Smith	6	6
12	(Australia) C Dibley (Australia) C Kachel	1	1
(Australia) B Carmichael (United States) B Teacher	6	6
(United Kingdom) J Feaver (Australia) J James	2	2

Quarterfinals
4	(United States) B Lutz (United States) S Smith	4	6
(Australia) B Carmichael (United States) B Teacher	6	7

=== Bottom half ===
==== Section 3 ====
First round
(United States) Tim Gullikson (United States) Tom Gullikson	2	6	1
(United States) J McEnroe (South Africa) B Mitton	6	1	6
(Mexico) R Chávez (Mexico) E Montaño	6	6	2
9	(Australia) S Ball (Australia) K Warwick	3	7	6
(Australia) S Docherty (United States) P Fishbach	4	5
(United States) P Gerken (United States) A Neely	6	7
(United States) M Cahill (United States) T Moor	6	6
6	(Australia) J Alexander (Australia) P Dent	3	0
(Italy) A Panatta (Italy) N Pietrangeli	3	6	6
(United States) D Crawford (South Africa) W Prinsloo	6	3	3
(Australia) J Bartlett (Australia) N Fraser	5	6
16	(Chile) H Gildemeister (Chile) B Prajoux	7	7
(United States) W Lofgren (United States) S Turner	2	1
(United States) H Bunis (Australia) P McNamee	6	6
(United States) T Giammalva (United States) B Scanlon	0	5
3	(Netherlands) T Okker (United States) M Riessen	6	7

Second round
(United States) J McEnroe (South Africa) B Mitton	3	4
9	(Australia) S Ball (Australia) K Warwick	6	6
(United States) P Gerken (United States) A Neely	6	1	2
(United States) M Cahill (United States) T Moor	4	6	6
(Italy) A Panatta (Italy) N Pietrangeli	2	3
16	(Chile) H Gildemeister (Chile) B Prajoux	6	6
(United States) H Bunis (Australia) P McNamee	6	3
3	(Netherlands) T Okker (United States) M Riessen	7	6

Third round
9	(Australia) S Ball (Australia) K Warwick	6	6	6
(United States) M Cahill (United States) T Moor	3	7	3
16	(Chile) H Gildemeister (Chile) B Prajoux	6	4	3
3	(Netherlands) T Okker (United States) M Riessen	2	6	6

Quarterfinals
9	(Australia) S Ball (Australia) K Warwick	7	6
3	(Netherlands) T Okker (United States) M Riessen	6	1

==== Section 4 ====
First round
(South Africa) J Eagleton (South Africa) D Joubert	3	2
(Chile) Á Fillol (Chile) J Fillol	6	6
(Canada) H Fritz (Canada) D Power	3	4
14	(Australia) M Edmondson (Australia) J Marks	6	6
(India) A Amritraj (United States) T Wilkison	6	7
(United States) M Mitchell (United States) T Noonan	4	6
(United States) D Bohrnstedt (United States) M Machette	7	6
(United States) J Bailey (Hong Kong) R King	6	1
(United States) E Fromm (United States) B Seewagen	6	2
(United States) P DuPré (United States) N Saviano	7	6
(United States) P Fleming (United States) G Mayer	3	4
11	(India) A Amritraj (India) V Amritraj	6	6
(United States) J Holladay (United States) S Mott	4	4
(United States) V Amaya (United States) W Brown	6	6
(United States) M Davis (United States) P Rennert	4	3
2	(United States) B Gottfried (Mexico) R Ramírez	6	6

Second round
(Chile) Á Fillol (Chile) J Fillol	7	2	6
14	(Australia) M Edmondson (Australia) J Marks	6	6	4
(India) A Amritraj (United States) T Wilkison	6	7	6
(United States) D Bohrnstedt (United States) M Machette	7	5	3
(United States) P DuPré (United States) N Saviano	6	5	6
11	(India) A Amritraj (India) V Amritraj	3	7	7
(United States) V Amaya (United States) W Brown	5	4
2	(United States) B Gottfried (Mexico) R Ramírez	7	6

Third round
(Chile) Á Fillol (Chile) J Fillol	6	6
(India) A Amritraj (United States) T Wilkison	1	2
11	(India) A Amritraj (India) V Amritraj	2	2
2	(United States) B Gottfried (Mexico) R Ramírez	6	6

Quarterfinals
(Chile) Á Fillol (Chile) J Fillol	3	4
2	(United States) B Gottfried (Mexico) R Ramírez	6	6
