= 1982 Toyota Women's Tennis Classic =

Tennis tournament

- Date: August 9–15
- Edition: 5th
- Category: Category 3
- Draw: 32S / 16D
- Prize money: $100,000
- Surface: Hard / outdoor
- Location: Atlanta, Georgia, U.S.

Champions

Singles
- (United States) Chris Evert-Lloyd

Doubles
- (United States) Kathy Jordan / (United States) Betsy Nagelsen
← 1981 ·	WTA Atlanta	· 1983 →

The 1982 Toyota Women's Tennis Classic was a women's tennis tournament played on outdoor hard courts in Atlanta, Georgia in the United States that was part of the 1982 Avon Championships World Championship Series. It was the fifth edition of the tournament and was held from August 9 through August 15, 1982. First-seeded Chris Evert-Lloyd won the singles title and earned $18,000 first-prize money.

== Finals ==
=== Singles ===
(United States) Chris Evert-Lloyd defeated (United States) Susan Mascarin 6–3, 6–1

- It was Evert-Lloyd's 5th singles title of the year and the 115th of her career.

=== Doubles ===
(United States) Kathy Jordan / (United States) Betsy Nagelsen defeated (United States) Chris Evert-Lloyd / (United States) Billie Jean King 4–6, 7–6^{(13–11)}, 7–6^{(7–3)}
