= 1980 Davison's Classic =

- Date: September 22–28
- Edition: 5th
- Category: Colgate Series (AA)
- Draw: 32S / 16D
- Prize money: $100,000
- Surface: Carpet / indoor (Sporteze)
- Location: Atlanta, United States
- Venue: Alexander Memorial Coliseum

Champions

Singles
- (Czechoslovakia) Hana Mandlíková

Doubles
- (United States) Barbara Potter / (United States) Sharon Walsh
← 1979 ·	WTA Atlanta	· 1981 →

The 1980 Davison's Classic was a women's tennis tournament played on indoor carpet courts at the Alexander Memorial Coliseum in Atlanta, Georgia in the United States. The event was part of the AA (Note: Tournaments with prize money for the women of at least $100,000.) category of the 1980 Colgate Series. It was the fifth edition of the tournament and was held from September 22 through September 28, 1980. Third-seeded Hana Mandlíková won the singles title and earned $20,000 first-prize money.

== Finals ==
=== Singles ===
(Czechoslovakia) Hana Mandlíková defeated (Australia) Wendy Turnbull 6–3, 7–5

- It was Mandlíková's 2nd singles title of the year and the 9th of her career.

=== Doubles ===
(United States) Barbara Potter / (United States) Sharon Walsh defeated (United States) Kathy Jordan / (United States) Anne Smith 6–3, 6–1

== Prize money ==
Event	W	F	SF	QF	Round of 16	Round of 32
Singles	$20,000	$10,000	$4,800	$2,100	$1,100	$550
