= Doug Crawford (tennis) =

American tennis player

- Country (sports): United States
- Born: October 15, 1949 (age 75); Boston, U.S.
- Height: 6 ft 2 in (188 cm)

Singles
- Career record: 18–48
- Highest ranking: No. 117 (Apr 30, 1975)

Grand Slam singles results
- French Open: 2R (1975)
- Wimbledon: 1R (1973, 1975)
- US Open: 3R (1977)

Doubles
- Career record: 6–27

Grand Slam doubles results
- French Open: 2R (1975)
- Wimbledon: 1R (1973)
- US Open: 1R (1974, 1977)

Doug Crawford (born October 15, 1949) is an American former professional tennis player.

Crawford, a native of Massachusetts, played collegiate tennis for the University of North Carolina at Chapel Hill

Active on the professional tour in the 1970s, Crawford reached a best singles world ranking of 117 and made the third round of the 1977 US Open, with wins over Nikola Špear and Francisco González.
