= 1981 Toyota Tennis Classic =

Women's singles tennis tournament

- Date: September 21–27
- Edition: 6th
- Category: Toyota Series (2)
- Draw: 32S / 16D
- Prize money: $75,000
- Surface: Carpet / indoor
- Location: Atlanta, United States

Champions

Singles
- (United States) Tracy Austin

Doubles
- (United States) Laura duPont / (United States) Betsy Nagelsen
← 1980 ·	WTA Atlanta	· 1982 →

The 1981 Toyota Tennis Classic was a women's singles tennis tournament played on indoor carpet courts in Atlanta, Georgia in the United States. The event was part of the category 2 (Note: Tournaments with prize money for the women of at least $75,000.) tournaments of the 1981 Toyota Series. It was the sixth edition of the tournament and was held from September 21 through September 27, 1981. First-seeded Tracy Austin won the singles title and earned 75 ranking points.

== Finals ==
=== Singles ===
(United States) Tracy Austin defeated (United States) Mary-Lou Piatek 4–6, 6–3, 6–3

- It was Austin's 6th singles title of the year and the 27th of her career.

=== Doubles ===
(United States) Laura duPont / (United States) Betsy Nagelsen defeated (United States) Rosie Casals / (United States) Candy Reynolds 6–4, 7–5

== Ranking points ==
Event	W	F	SF	QF	Round of 16	Round of 32
Singles	75	50	35	20	10	3
