= Willem Prinsloo =

South African tennis player

- Country (sports): South Africa
- Born: 25 February 1954
- Died: 27 June 2018 (aged 64)

Singles
- Career record: 13–32
- Highest ranking: No. 81 (2 July 1977)

Grand Slam singles results
- French Open: 1R (1977)
- Wimbledon: 1R (1977)
- US Open: 2R (1977, 1978)

Doubles
- Career record: 7–32

Grand Slam doubles results
- French Open: 1R (1977)
- Wimbledon: 1R (1977)
- US Open: 2R (1978)

Mixed doubles

Grand Slam mixed doubles results
- Wimbledon: 3R (1974)
- US Open: 1R (1977)

Willem Petrus Odendaal Prinsloo (25 February 1954 – 27 June 2018) was a South African tennis player.

== Tennis career ==
During his career, Prinsloo participated at the French Open, Wimbledon and the US Open. His best singles performance at a Grand Slam was reaching the second round at the 1977 and 1978 US Open.

On the Grand Prix circuit he reached the quarter-finals at the 1976 South African Open before losing to the eventual champion, Harold Solomon. On the Challenger Tour he reached the final at the Raleigh Challenger, losing to Mike Cahill. He achieved career-high world rankings of No.81 in singles during July 1977.
