= 1981 Toyota Swiss Open =

- Date: 11–17 May
- Edition: 6th
- Category: Toyota Series (Cat 3)
- Draw: 32S / 32D
- Prize money: $100,000
- Surface: Clay / outdoor
- Location: Lugano, Switzerland

Champions

Singles
- (United States) Chris Evert-Lloyd

Doubles
- (South Africa) Rosalyn Fairbank / (South Africa) Tanya Harford
- WTA Swiss Open

The 1981 Toyota Swiss Open was a women's tennis tournament played on outdoor clay courts in Lugano, Switzerland that was part of the Toyota Series of the 1981 WTA Tour. It was the sixth edition of the tournament and was held from 11 May until 17 May 1981. First-seeded Chris Evert-Lloyd won the singles title and earned $20,000 first-prize money.

== Finals ==
=== Singles ===
(United States) Chris Evert-Lloyd defeated (Romania) Virginia Ruzici 6–1, 6–1

- It was Evert-Lloyd's 6th singles title of the year and the 107th of her career.

=== Doubles ===
(South Africa) Rosalyn Fairbank / (South Africa) Tanya Harford defeated (United States) Candy Reynolds / (United States) Paula Smith 2–6, 6–1, 6–4
