= 1977 South African Open (tennis) =

- Date: 28 November – 6 December
- Edition: 74th
- Category: Grand Prix (5 Star) (M); Colgate series (W)
- Draw: 32S / 16D
- Prize money: $150,000 (M) $35,000 (W)
- Surface: Hard / outdoor
- Location: Johannesburg, South Africa
- Venue: Ellis Park Tennis Stadium

Champions

Men's singles
- (Argentina) Guillermo Vilas

Women's singles
- (South Africa) Linky Boshoff

Men's doubles
- (United States) Bob Lutz / (United States) Stan Smith

Women's doubles
- (South Africa) Ilana Kloss / (South Africa) Linky Boshoff

Mixed doubles
- (South Africa) Linky Boshoff / (Rhodesia) Colin Dowdeswell
- South African Open

The 1977 South African Open, also known by its sponsored name SAB Open, was a combined men's and women's tennis tournament played on outdoor hard courts in Johannesburg, South Africa. The men's tournament was part of the 1977 Colgate-Palmolive Grand Prix while the women's event was part of the 1977–1978 Colgate International Series. It was the 74th edition of the tournament and was held from 28 November through 6 December 1977. Guillermo Vilas and Linky Boshoff won the singles titles.

== Finals ==
=== Men's singles ===
(Argentina) Guillermo Vilas defeated (United Kingdom) Buster Mottram 7–6, 6–3, 6–4

=== Women's singles ===
(South Africa) Linky Boshoff defeated (South Africa) Brigitte Cuypers 6–1, 6–4

=== Men's doubles ===
(United States) Bob Lutz / (United States) Stan Smith defeated (United States) Peter Fleming / (South Africa) Raymond Moore 6–3, 7–5, 6–7, 7–6

=== Women's doubles ===
(South Africa) Ilana Kloss / (South Africa) Linky Boshoff defeated (South Africa) Brigitte Cuypers / (South Africa) Marise Kruger 5–7, 6–3, 6–3

=== Mixed doubles ===
(South Africa) Linky Boshoff / (Rhodesia) Colin Dowdeswell defeated (South Africa) Ilana Kloss / (United States) Sherwood Stewart 6–4, 4–6. 7–5
