= 1977 US Open – Men's singles =

Men's singles
- 1977 US Open

Final
- Champion: (Argentina) Guillermo Vilas
- Runner-up: (United States) Jimmy Connors
- Score: 2–6, 6–3, 7–6^{(7–4)}, 6–0

Details
- Draw: 128 (12 Q )
- Seeds: 16

Events
Singles	men	women		boys	girls
Doubles	men	women	mixed	boys	girls
WC Singles	men	women	quad
WC Doubles	men	women	quad
Legends	men	women	mixed
- US Open

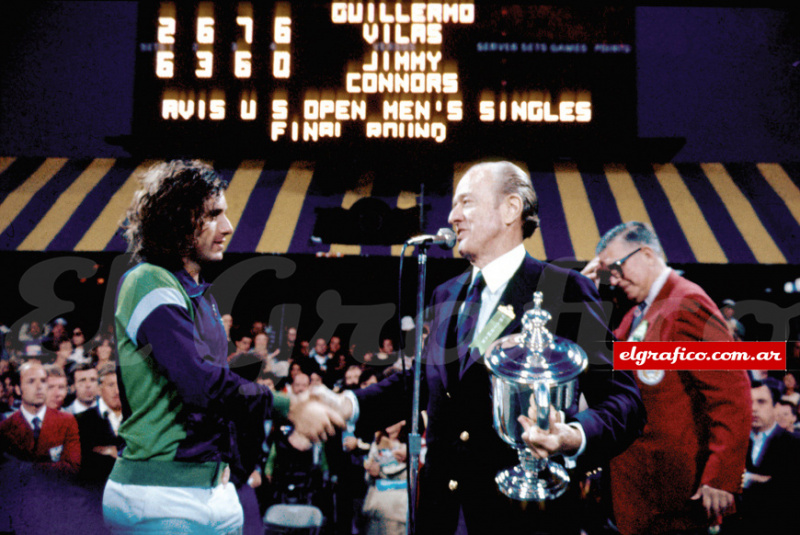
Guillermo Vilas being awarded with the trophy after defeating Jimmy Connors at the final

Guillermo Vilas defeated defending champion Jimmy Connors in the final, 2–6, 6–3, 7–6^{(7–4)}, 6–0 to win the men's singles tennis title at the 1977 US Open. It was his first US Open title and second major title overall.

This was the third and last edition of the US Open to be played on clay courts; it switched the following year to hardcourts.

The competition was played best-of-three sets in the first four rounds, followed by best-of-five sets from the quarterfinals onward.

== Seeds ==
The seeded players are listed below. Guillermo Vilas is the champion; others show the round in which they were eliminated.

1. (Sweden) Björn Borg (fourth round)
2. (United States) Jimmy Connors (finalist)
3. (United States) Brian Gottfried (quarterfinalist)
4. (Argentina) Guillermo Vilas (champion)
5. (Spain) Manuel Orantes (quarterfinalist)
6. (Mexico) Raúl Ramírez (first round)
7. (Romania) Ilie Năstase (second round)
8. (United States) Vitas Gerulaitis (fourth round)
9. (United States) Eddie Dibbs (third round)
10. (United States) Dick Stockton (quarterfinalist)
11. (United States) Roscoe Tanner (fourth round)
12. (United States) Harold Solomon (semifinalist)
13. (United Kingdom) Mark Cox (first round)
14. (Australia) Ken Rosewall (third round)
15. (Poland) Wojtek Fibak (fourth round)
16. (United States) Stan Smith (second round)

== Draw ==
=== Key ===
- Q = Qualifier
- WC = Wild card
- LL = Lucky loser
- r = Retired

=== Final eight ===
Quarterfinals
10	(United States) Dick Stockton	4	4	2
12	(United States) Harold Solomon	6	6	6
4	(Argentina) Guillermo Vilas	6	6	6
(South Africa) Raymond Moore	1	1	0
(Italy) Corrado Barazzutti	6	6	6
3	(United States) Brian Gottfried	2	1	2
5	(Spain) Manuel Orantes	2	4	3
2	(United States) Jimmy Connors	6	6	6

Semifinals
12	(United States) Harold Solomon	2	6^{3}	2
4	(Argentina) Guillermo Vilas	6	7^{7}	6
(Italy) Corrado Barazzutti	5	3	5
2	(United States) Jimmy Connors	7	6	7

Final
4	(Argentina) Guillermo Vilas	2	6	7^{7}	6
2	(United States) Jimmy Connors	6	3	6^{4}	0

=== Section 1 ===
First round
1	(Sweden) Borg	6	6
(United States) Waltke	2	1
(Australia) James	6	4	6
(Paraguay) Pecci Sr.	4	6	3
(South Africa) Prinsloo	3	7	6
(United States) Borowiak	6	6	1
(Spain) Soler	2	4
(New Zealand) Parun	6	6
(United States) Krulevitz	6	6
(South Africa) Schneider	4	3
(West Germany) Gebert	4	3
(Italy) Panatta	6	6
Q	(United States) Neely	6	3	4
(Australia) Alexander	3	6	6
(United States) Amaya	5	2
10	(United States) Stockton	7	6

Second round
1	(Sweden) Borg	7	6
(Australia) James	5	4
(South Africa) Prinsloo	6	0	1
(New Zealand) Parun	3	6	6
(United States) Krulevitz	1	6
(Italy) Panatta	6	7
(Australia) Alexander	3	6	6
10	(United States) Stockton	6	3	7

Third round
1	(Sweden) Borg	6	6
(New Zealand) Parun	1	3
(Italy) Panatta	6	4	4
10	(United States) Stockton	2	6	6

Fourth round
1	(Sweden) Borg	6	4	0^{r}
10	(United States) Stockton	3	6	1

=== Section 2 ===
First round
12	(United States) Solomon	3	6	7
(South Africa) Mitton	6	3	5
(Australia) Marks	4	6	2
Q	(United States) Gerken	6	4	6
(Spain) Muñoz	6	4	6
(United Kingdom) Lewis	3	6	4
(United States) Fagel	6	4	6
(New Zealand) Simpson	1	6	4
(South Africa) Yuill	6	6
Q	(Finland) Palin	2	4
(Australia) Dibley	5	2
(United States) Fleming	7	6
(Chile) Prajoux	2	4
(Czechoslovakia) Šmid	6	6
(France) Dominguez	2	0
8	(United States) Gerulaitis	6	6

Second round
12	(United States) Solomon	6	6
Q	(United States) Gerken	3	1
(Spain) Muñoz	2	4
(United States) Fagel	6	6
(South Africa) Yuill	6	6
(United States) Fleming	1	3
(Czechoslovakia) Šmid	2	6
8	(United States) Gerulaitis	6	7

Third round
12	(United States) Solomon	2	6	6
(United States) Fagel	6	1	3
(South Africa) Yuill	5	1
8	(United States) Gerulaitis	7	6

Fourth round
12	(United States) Solomon	7^{7}	6
8	(United States) Gerulaitis	6^{3}	3

=== Section 3 ===
First round
4	(Argentina) Vilas	6	6
(Spain) Santana	1	0
(United States) Mayer	7	6
(Sweden) Norbäck	6	3
(United States) Hagey	4	6
(Australia) Docherty	6	7
(United States) Amaya	6	7
(United States) Hardie	2	5
(Spain) Higueras	6	6
(United States) Wilkison	2	2
Q	(United States) Schoenfield	6	5	3^{d}
(United States) Manson	3	7	5
(United States) Richardson	4	4
(Australia) Dent	6	6
(United States) Gullikson	0	4
14	(Australia) Rosewall	6	6

Second round
4	(Argentina) Vilas	6	6
(United States) Mayer	3	0
(Australia) Docherty	6	3	5
(United States) Amaya	4	6	7
(Spain) Higueras	7	3	6
(United States) Manson	6	6	2
(Australia) Dent	1	3
14	(Australia) Rosewall	6	6

Third round
4	(Argentina) Vilas	6	6
(United States) Amaya	3	3
(Spain) Higueras	6	6
14	(Australia) Rosewall	4	4

Fourth round
4	(Argentina) Vilas	6	6
(Spain) Higueras	3	1

=== Section 4 ===
First round
16	(United States) Smith	7	6
(United States) Bohrnstedt	6	2
(United States) Martin	1	5
Q	(United States) Fishbach	6	7
(Colombia) Betancur	6	4	3
(India) Amritraj	3	6	6
(United Kingdom) Feaver	7	6
(United States) Pasarell	5	1
(South Africa) Moore	6	6
(United States) Gullikson	4	3
(France) Proisy	6	6
(United States) Delaney	4	2
(Colombia) Molina	2	7	6
(South Africa) Hewitt	6	5	3
Q	(Ecuador) Ycaza	6	6
6	(Mexico) Ramírez	3	2

Second round
16	(United States) Smith	0	2
Q	(United States) Fishbach	6	6
(India) Amritraj	7	2	3
(United Kingdom) Feaver	6	6	6
(South Africa) Moore	6	6
(France) Proisy	1	2
(Colombia) Molina	6	4
Q	(Ecuador) Ycaza	7	6

Third round
Q	(United States) Fishbach	6	4	0
(United Kingdom) Feaver	2	6	6
(South Africa) Moore	6	6
Q	(Ecuador) Ycaza	3	2

Fourth round
(United Kingdom) Feaver	7	4	2
(South Africa) Moore	5	6	6

=== Section 5 ===
First round
7	(Romania) Năstase	6	6
(South Africa) McMillan	0	0
(United States) Scanlon	2	4
(Italy) Barazzutti	6	6
(Chile) Fillol	6	6
(Australia) Kronk	2	0
(Australia) Edmondson	3	6	6
Q	(Brazil) Guedes	6	1	4
(United States) Teacher	3	7	6
(Australia) Kachel	6	6	2
(Socialist Federal Republic of Yugoslavia) Franulović	4	6	6
(United States) Pfister	6	1	3
(United Kingdom) Lloyd	6	0	6
(South Africa) Joubert	2	6	4
(United States) Walts	7	7
13	(United Kingdom) Cox	6	6

Second round
7	(Romania) Năstase	4	4
(Italy) Barazzutti	6	6
(Chile) Fillol	1	2
(Australia) Edmondson	6	6
(United States) Teacher	2	2
(Socialist Federal Republic of Yugoslavia) Franulović	6	6
(United Kingdom) Lloyd	3	3
(United States) Walts	6	6

Third round
(Italy) Barazzutti	6	6
(Australia) Edmondson	1	0
(Socialist Federal Republic of Yugoslavia) Franulović	1	2
(United States) Walts	6	6

Fourth round
(Italy) Barazzutti	6	6
(United States) Walts	2	0

=== Section 6 ===
First round
15	(Poland) Fibak	6	6
(Australia) Case	2	2
(India) Menon	7	2	6
(United States) Saviano	6	6	3
(United States) Crawford	6	7	6
(Socialist Federal Republic of Yugoslavia) Špear	7	5	4
Q	(Paraguay) González	6	7
(Argentina) Cano	3	5
(United States) Richey	6	6
Q	(United States) Giammalva	2	2
(Czechoslovakia) Kodeš	7	6
(United States) Lofgren	5	0
(United States) Riessen	6	6
(Australia) Carmichael	3	2
(United States) Winitsky	3	3
3	(United States) Gottfried	6	6

Second round
15	(Poland) Fibak	6	6
(India) Menon	1	2
(United States) Crawford	6	6
Q	(Paraguay) González	3	3
(United States) Richey	5	0
(Czechoslovakia) Kodeš	7	6
(United States) Riessen	5	6	3
3	(United States) Gottfried	7	2	6

Third round
15	(Poland) Fibak	6	6
(United States) Crawford	1	1
(Czechoslovakia) Kodeš	4	2
3	(United States) Gottfried	6	6

Fourth round
15	(Poland) Fibak	7	3	4
3	(United States) Gottfried	6	6	6

=== Section 7 ===
First round
5	(Spain) Orantes	6	6
Q	(United States) Maze	1	0
(India) Amritraj	6	6	5
(Australia) Stolle	3	7	7
(United States) Du Pré	5	0
(France) Jauffret	7	6
(United States) Machette	1	4
(United States) Stewart	6	6
(Chile) Gildemeister	6	6
(Chile) Fillol Sr.	0	3
(United States) McEnroe	6	6
(United States) Teltscher	1	3
(France) Deblicker	4	6	2
(United States) McNair	6	4	6
(Argentina) Álvarez	4	3
9	(United States) Dibbs	6	6

Second round
5	(Spain) Orantes	6	6
(Australia) Stolle	2	2
(France) Jauffret	5	3
(United States) Stewart	7	6
(Chile) Gildemeister	5	1
(United States) McEnroe	7	6
(United States) McNair	2	2
9	(United States) Dibbs	6	6

Third round
5	(Spain) Orantes	6	6
(United States) Stewart	4	3
(United States) McEnroe	6	4	6
9	(United States) Dibbs	2	6	4

Fourth round
5	(Spain) Orantes	6	6
(United States) McEnroe	2	3

=== Section 8 ===
First round
11	(United States) Tanner	4	7	6
(United States) Mitchell	6	6	1
(Rhodesia) Pattison	6	6
(Australia) McNamee	4	0
(United States) Moor	7	6
(South Africa) Drysdale	6	2
(United States) Bunis	6	6	6
(Venezuela) Andrew	7	4	2
(Australia) Letcher	2	1
(United States) Guerry	6	6
(Australia) Warwick	3	6
(United States) Cahill	6	7
(United States) Lutz	6	6
(Hungary) Taróczy	4	2
Q	(India) Singh	2	0
2	(United States) Connors	6	6

Second round
11	(United States) Tanner	6	6	6
(Rhodesia) Pattison	7	0	3
(United States) Moor	6	6
(United States) Bunis	2	4
(United States) Guerry	6	7
(United States) Cahill	4	5
(United States) Lutz	2	2
2	(United States) Connors	6	6

Third round
11	(United States) Tanner	6	6
(United States) Moor	3	1
(United States) Guerry	1	4
2	(United States) Connors	6	6

Fourth round
11	(United States) Tanner	0	2
2	(United States) Connors	6	6

Preceded by 1977 Wimbledon Championships – Men's singles	Grand Slam men's singles	Succeeded by 1977 Australian Open (December) – Men's singles
