= 1983 Virginia Slims of Atlanta =

- Date: April 25 – May 2
- Edition: 6th
- Category: Category 3
- Draw: 32S / 16D
- Prize money: $150,000
- Surface: Hard / outdoor
- Location: Atlanta, Georgia, U.S.

Champions

Singles
- (United States) Pam Shriver

Doubles
- (United States) Alycia Moulton / (United States) Sharon Walsh
← 1982 ·	WTA Atlanta

The 1983 Virginia Slims of Atlanta was a women's tennis tournament played on outdoor hard courts in Atlanta, Georgia in the United States that was part of the 1983 Virginia Slims World Championship Series. The tournament was held from April 25 through May 2, 1983. Second-seeded Pam Shriver won the singles title.

== Finals ==
=== Singles ===
(United States) Pam Shriver defeated (United States) Kathy Jordan 6–2, 6–0

- It was Shriver's 1st singles title of the year and the 4th of her career.

=== Doubles ===
(United States) Alycia Moulton / (United States) Sharon Walsh defeated (United States) Rosemary Casals / (Australia) Wendy Turnbull 6–3, 7–6

- It was Moulton's 2nd title of the year and the 3rd of her career. It was Walsh's 3rd title of the year and the 14th of her career.
