= 1979 South African Open (tennis) =

- Date: 27 November – 3 December
- Edition: 76th
- Category: Grand Prix
- Draw: 32S / 16D
- Prize money: $175,000
- Surface: Hard / outdoor
- Location: Johannesburg, South Africa
- Venue: Ellis Park Tennis Stadium

Champions

Men's singles
- (Rhodesia) Andrew Pattison

Women's singles
- (South Africa) Brigitte Cuypers

Men's doubles
- (South Africa) Bob Hewitt / (South Africa) Frew McMillan

Women's doubles
- (United Kingdom) Lesley Charles / (South Africa) Tanya Harford
- South African Open

The 1979 South African Open was a combined men's and women's tennis tournament played on outdoor hard courts in Johannesburg, South Africa. The men's tournament was part of the 1979 Colgate-Palmolive Grand Prix. It was the 76th edition of the tournament and was held from 27 November through 3 December 1979. Andrew Pattison and Brigitte Cuypers won the singles titles.

== Finals ==
=== Men's singles ===
(Rhodesia) Andrew Pattison defeated (Paraguay) Víctor Pecci 2–6, 6–3, 6–2, 6–3

=== Women's singles ===
(South Africa) Brigitte Cuypers defeated (South Africa) Tanya Harford 7–6, 6–2

=== Men's doubles ===
(South Africa) Bob Hewitt / (South Africa) Frew McMillan defeated (Switzerland) Heinz Günthardt / (Australia) Paul McNamee 1–6, 6–1, 6–4

=== Women's doubles ===
(United Kingdom) Lesley Charles / (South Africa) Tanya Harford defeated (France) Françoise Dürr / (South Africa) Marise Kruger 1–6, 6–1, 6–4
