= 1979 Davison's Tennis Classic =

1979 Davison's Classic
- Date: September 23–29
- Edition: 4th
- Category: Colgate Series (AAA)
- Draw: 32S / 16D
- Prize money: $100,000
- Surface: Carpet / indoor
- Location: Atlanta, United States
- Venue: Alexander Memorial Coliseum
- Attendance: 56,011

Champions

Singles
- (United States) Martina Navratilova

Doubles
- (Netherlands) Betty Stöve / (Australia) Wendy Turnbull
← 1978 ·	WTA Atlanta	· 1980 →

The 1979 Davison's Classic was a women's singles tennis tournament played on indoor carpet courts at the Alexander Memorial Coliseum in Atlanta, Georgia in the United States. The event was part of the AAA (Note: Tournaments with prize money for the women of at least $100,000.) category of the 1979 Colgate Series. It was the fourth edition of the tournament and was held from September 23 through September 29, 1979. First-seeded Martina Navratilova won the singles title and earned $20,000 first-prize money.

== Finals ==
=== Singles ===
(United States) Martina Navratilova defeated (Australia) Wendy Turnbull 7–6^{(8–6)}, 6–4

- It was Navratilova's 8th title of the year and the 32nd of her career.

=== Doubles ===
(Netherlands) Betty Stöve / (Australia) Wendy Turnbull defeated (United States) Ann Kiyomura / (United States) Anne Smith 6–2, 6–4

== Prize money ==
Event	W	F	SF	QF	Round of 16	Round of 32
Singles	$20,000	$10,000	$4,500	$2,100	$1,100	$550
