= 1979 Avon Championships of Chicago =

- Date: January 29 – February 4
- Edition: 8th
- Category: Virginia Slims circuit
- Draw: 32S / 16D
- Prize money: $200,000
- Surface: Carpet (Sporteze) / indoor
- Location: Chicago, Illinois, US
- Venue: International Amphitheatre

Champions

Singles
- (United States) Martina Navratilova

Doubles
- (United States) Rosie Casals / (United States) Betty-Ann Stuart
- Virginia Slims of Chicago

The 1979 Avon Championships of Chicago was a women's tennis tournament played on indoor carpet courts at the International Amphitheatre in Chicago, Illinois in the United States that was part of the 1979 Avon Championships Circuit. It was the eighth edition of the tournament and was held from January 29 through February 4, 1979. First-seeded Martina Navratilova won the singles title and earned $40,000 first-prize money.

== Finals ==
=== Singles ===
(United States) Martina Navratilova defeated (United States) Tracy Austin 6–3, 6–4

- It was Navratilova's 3rd singles title of the year and the 27th of her career.

=== Doubles ===
(United States) Rosie Casals / (United States) Betty-Ann Stuart defeated (South Africa) Ilana Kloss / (South Africa) Greer Stevens 3–6, 7–5, 7–5

== Prize money ==
Event	W	F	3rd	4th	QF	Round of 16	Round of 32
Singles	$40,000	$20,000	$10,100	$9,700	$4,500	$2,290	$1,200
