= Carol Baily =

American tennis player

- Full name: Carol Lynn Baily
- Country (sports): United States
- Born: October 22, 1950 (age 74)

Singles

Grand Slam singles results
- Australian Open: Q2 (1981)
- US Open: 1R (1977, 1981)

Doubles
- Career titles: 1 WTA

Grand Slam doubles results
- Australian Open: 1R (1981)
- US Open: 1R (1977, 1981)

Grand Slam mixed doubles results
- US Open: 1R (1977)

Carol Lynn Baily (born October 22, 1950) is an American former professional tennis player.

A native of Colorado, Baily played in two national championship teams with Arizona State University and finished her collegiate career at the University of Colorado.

While competing on tour she featured twice in the singles main draw of the US Open and had a win over Kathy Jordan at the 1981 National Panasonic Classic. In 1982 she won a WTA Tour (Avon) doubles title in Newport.

Baily, a longtime Steamboat Springs resident, is a member of the Colorado Sports Hall of Fame.

== WTA Tour finals ==
=== Doubles (1–0) ===
Result	Date	Tournament	Surface	Partner	Opponents	Score
Win	Jan 1982	Avon Championships of Newport, United States	Carpet	(Netherlands) Marcella Mesker	(Romania) Lucia Romanov (France) Corinne Vanier	6–2, 6–1
