= 1981 Australian Open – Women's singles qualifying =

Women's singles qualifying
- 1981 Australian Open

Events
Singles	men	women		boys	girls
Doubles	men	women	mixed	boys	girls
WC Singles	men	women	quad
WC Doubles	men	women	quad
Legends	men	women	mixed

Qualification
Singles	men	women
- Australian Open

This article displays the qualifying draw for women's singles at the 1981 Australian Open.

== Seeds ==
1. (Netherlands) Marcella Mesker (first round)
2. (France) Catherine Tanvier (qualified)
3. (Australia) Amanda Tobin (qualified)
4. (United States) Carol Baily (qualifying competition)
5. (United States) Jane Preyer (first round)
6. (Australia) Debbie Freeman (qualifying competition)
7. (Czechoslovakia) Kateřina Skronská (qualified)
8. (Australia) Brenda Remilton-Ward (qualified)

== Qualifiers ==
1. (Czechoslovakia) Helena Suková
2. (Australia) Brenda Remilton-Ward
3. (Australia) Karen Gulley
4. (United States) Kim Steinmetz
5. (West Germany) Helga Lütten
6. (Australia) Amanda Tobin
7. (Czechoslovakia) Kateřina Skronská
8. (France) Catherine Tanvier

== Qualifying draw ==
Key

- Q = Qualifier
- WC = Wild card
- LL = Lucky loser
- Alt = Alternate
- ITF = ITF entry
- PR = Protected ranking
- SR = Special ranking
- SE = Special exempt
- JE = Junior exempt
- JR = Junior Accelerator Programme entrant
- CO = College Accelerator Programme entrant
- NG = Next Gen Accelerator Program entrant
- w/o = Walkover
- r = Retired
- d = Defaulted

=== First qualifier ===
First round
1	(Netherlands) Marcella Mesker	7	3	3
(Australia) Chris O'Neil	6	6	6
(Czechoslovakia) Helena Suková	6	6
(Australia) Brenda Catton	3	2

Qualifying competition
(Australia) Chris O'Neil	3	4
(Czechoslovakia) Helena Suková	6	6

=== Second qualifier ===
First round
(Japan) Naoko Sato	7	5	0
(Sweden) Mimmi Wikstedt	6	7	6
(Australia) Linda Cassell	6	1	1
8	(Australia) Brenda Remilton-Ward	4	6	6

Qualifying competition
(Sweden) Mimmi Wikstedt	6	1	4
8	(Australia) Brenda Remilton-Ward	2	6	6

=== Third qualifier ===
First round
4	(United States) Carol Baily	3	6	6
(Australia) Bernadette Randall	6	1	4
(Australia) Karen Gulley	6	5	6
(Socialist Federal Republic of Yugoslavia) Renata Šašak	1	7	4

Qualifying competition
4	(United States) Carol Baily	6	2	3
(Australia) Karen Gulley	0	6	6

=== Fourth qualifier ===
First round
(United States) Ann Henricksson	1	4
(United States) Kim Steinmetz	6	6
(Australia) Elizabeth Little	6	7	7
5	(United States) Jane Preyer	7	5	6

Qualifying competition
(United States) Kim Steinmetz	7	6
(Australia) Elizabeth Little	6	4

=== Fifth qualifier ===
First round
6	(Australia) Debbie Freeman	6	6
(Australia) Kerryn Pratt	3	4
(West Germany) Helga Lütten	6	6	6
(United States) Lucy Gordon	7	3	2

Qualifying competition
6	(Australia) Debbie Freeman	3	3
(West Germany) Helga Lütten	6	6

=== Sixth qualifier ===
First round
(New Zealand) Brenda Perry	4	3
(Australia) Sharon Hodgkin	6	6
(Australia) Debbie Chesterton	4	3
3	(Australia) Amanda Tobin	6	6

Qualifying competition
(Australia) Sharon Hodgkin	4	6	0
3	(Australia) Amanda Tobin	6	4	6

=== Seventh qualifier ===
First round
7	(Czechoslovakia) Kateřina Skronská	6	6
(Australia) Pam Whytcross	2	1
(South Africa) Elizabeth Gordon	5	7	6
(France) Sophie Amiach	7	6	4

Qualifying competition
7	(Czechoslovakia) Kateřina Skronská	6	6
(South Africa) Elizabeth Gordon	3	3

=== Eighth qualifier ===
First round
(Australia) Elizabeth Smylie	3	1
(Australia) Maree Booth	6	6
(New Zealand) Chris Newton	3	3
2	(France) Catherine Tanvier	6	6

Qualifying competition
(Australia) Maree Booth	3	6
2	(France) Catherine Tanvier	6	7
