= Tanya Harford =

South African tennis player (born 1958)

- Full name: Tanya Jane Harford Gemmell
- Country (sports): South Africa
- Born: 28 November 1958 (age 67) Cape Town, South Africa
- Height: 1.62 m (5 ft 4 in)
- Plays: Right-handed

Singles
- Career titles: 0

Grand Slam singles results
- Australian Open: 1R (1980)
- French Open: 2R (1982)
- Wimbledon: 3R (1980, 1982)
- US Open: 3R (1977)

Doubles
- Career titles: 4

Grand Slam doubles results
- Australian Open: 2R (1980)
- French Open: W (1981)
- Wimbledon: SF (1981)
- US Open: QF (1978, 1981)

Grand Slam mixed doubles results
- Wimbledon: QF (1981)
- US Open: 1R (1980, 1980)

Tanya Harford (born 28 November 1958) is a retired South African tennis player.

In 1981 she won the doubles title at the French Open together with compatriot Rosalyn Fairbank. In the final they defeated Candy Reynolds and Paula Smith in straight sets. Her best result at the Wimbledon Championships was reaching the third round in the singles in 1980 and 1982 as well as the semifinal in the doubles and the quarterfinal in the mixed doubles event.

In 1976 she was a runner-up at the Irish Open. Harford reached the final of the South African Open in 1979 but lost in straight sets to Brigitte Cuypers. With Fairbank she won the doubles title at the WTA Swiss Open in 1981.

She served as chair for the Joburg Gay Pride Festival Company, which was organizing the Johannesburg gay pride parade until the dissolution of the company in April 2013, following controversy over the 2012 edition.

== Grand Slam finals ==
=== Doubles: 1 (1 title) ===
Result	Year	Championship	Surface	Partner	Opponents	Score
Win	1981	French Open	Clay	(South Africa) Rosalyn Fairbank	(United States) Candy Reynolds (United States) Paula Smith	6–1, 6–3

== Career finals ==
=== Singles (1 runner-up) ===
Result	W/L	Date	Tournament	Surface	Opponent	Score
Loss	0–1	Dec 1979	Johannesburg, South Africa	Hard	(South Africa) Brigitte Cuypers	6–7, 2–6

=== Doubles (4 titles) ===
Result	W/L	Date	Tournament	Surface	Partner	Opponents	Score
Win	1–0	Dec 1979	Johannesburg, South Africa	Hard	(United Kingdom) Lesley Charles	(France) Françoise Dürr (South Africa) Marise Kruger	1–6, 6–1, 6–4
Win	2–0	May 1981	Lugano, Switzerland	Clay	(South Africa) Rosalyn Fairbank	(United States) Candy Reynolds (United States) Paula Smith	2–6, 6–1, 6–4
Win	3–0	May 1981	Berlin, West Germany	Clay	(South Africa) Rosalyn Fairbank	(United Kingdom) Sue Barker (Czechoslovakia) Renáta Tomanová	6–3, 6–4
Win	4–0	Jun 1981	French Open	Clay	(South Africa) Rosalyn Fairbank	(United States) Candy Reynolds (United States) Paula Smith	6–1, 6–3
