= Zan Guerry =

American tennis player (born 1949)

- Full name: Alexander Guerry III
- Country (sports): United States
- Born: February 12, 1949 (age 77) Lookout Mountain, Tennessee, United States

Singles
- Career record: 28–62
- Career titles: 0
- Highest ranking: No. 105 (January 16, 1978)

Grand Slam singles results
- French Open: 2R (1969)
- Wimbledon: 2R (1973)
- US Open: 3R (1977)

Doubles
- Career record: 14–27
- Career titles: 1

Grand Slam doubles results
- French Open: 2R (1969)
- Wimbledon: 1R (1973)
- US Open: 1R (1977)

Alexander "Zan" Guerry III (born February 12, 1949) is an American former professional tennis player.

== Biography ==
Guerry, winner of the Under-16s Orange Bowl title in 1964, grew up in Chattanooga, Tennessee, and won 13 national junior titles in the 1960s. He attended Baylor School in Chattanooga, at the same time as Roscoe Tanner, a teammate in the school's tennis team.

=== College ===
After finishing at Baylor in 1967, Guerry went to Rice University for four years and played in a strong varsity side which were runners-up in the NCAA Championships twice, in 1968 and 1970. He was a losing finalist, to Butch Seewagen, at the 1969 United States Amateur Championships and earned multiple All-American selections, before graduating in 1971. Following that he went to Wharton Business School and worked at the Texas Commerce Bank in Houston as a financial planner when not playing tennis.

=== Professional career ===
During the 1970s, Guerry competed professionally on the world tennis circuit. He had a win over a young Guillermo Vilas early in his career in 1970. His only Grand Prix title came at Jackson in 1973, when he partnered South African Frew McMillan to win the Mississippi International Indoor Tennis Championship doubles tournament. He made the main draws of the singles at the French Open in 1969 and Wimbledon in 1973, in addition to five appearances at the US Open. At the 1973 Wimbledon Championships he made it to the second round, where he lost a five set match to Bernard Mitton. He lost to Jimmy Connors in the third round of the 1977 US Open, which was the furthest he got in a Grand Slam tournament. In 1977 he managed to defeat Stan Smith in Washington. It wasn't the first time he had beaten him in a match, having caused a greater upset while at Rice University in 1971 when he defeated the then number one ranked Smith in Houston. He was inducted into the ITA Collegiate Tennis Hall of Fame in 2010 and the Tennessee Sports Hall of Fame in 2012.

=== Business ===
In 1978 he joined healthcare company Chattem and was CEO for 25 years. In 2014 he was announced as chairman.

== Grand Prix career finals ==
=== Doubles: 1 (1–0) ===
Result	W/L	Date	Tournament	Surface	Partner	Opponents	Score
Win	1–0	Mar 1973	Jackson, United States	Hard	(South Africa) Frew McMillan	(Chile) Jaime Pinto Bravo (Argentina) Tito Vázquez	6–2, 6–4
