= Renée Richards =

US tennis player and ophthalmologist (born 1934)

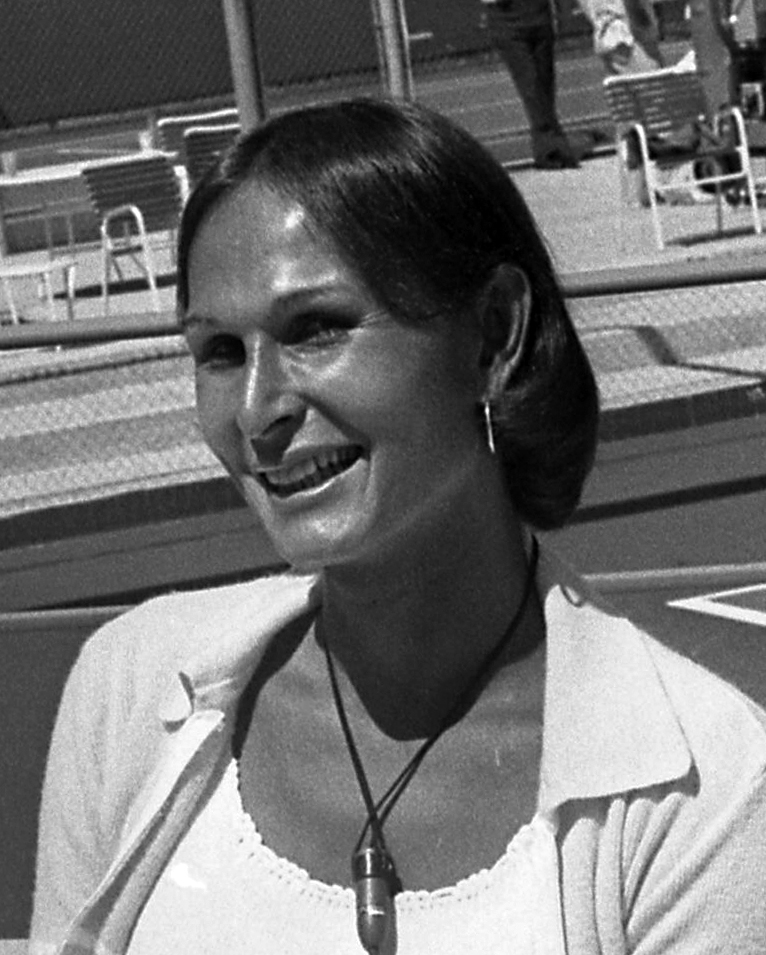
- Richards in 1976
- Country (sports): United States
- Born: August 19, 1934 (age 92) New York City, US
- Height: 6 ft 1 in (1.85 m)
- Turned pro: 1977
- Retired: 1981
- Plays: Left-handed

Singles
- Career titles: 0 WTA
- Highest ranking: No. 20 (February 1979)

Grand Slam singles results
- US Open: 3R (1979)

Doubles
- Career titles: 0 WTA

Grand Slam doubles results
- US Open: F (1977)

Mixed doubles
- Career titles: 0

Grand Slam mixed doubles results
- US Open: SF (1979)

Renée Richards (born August 19, 1934) is an American ophthalmologist and former tennis player who competed on the professional circuit in the 1970s, and became widely known following male-to-female medical affirmation, when she fought to compete as a woman in the 1976 US Open.

The United States Tennis Association began requiring genetic screening for female players that year. Richards challenged that policy, and the New York Supreme Court ruled in her favor, a landmark case in transgender rights. Among the first professional athletes to transition, she became a spokesperson for transgender people in sports. After retiring from play, she coached Martina Navratilova to two Wimbledon titles (1982 and 1983).

== Early life ==
Richards was born Richard Raskind on August 19, 1934, in New York City and raised, as she put it, as "a nice Jewish boy" in Forest Hills, Queens. Her father David Raskind was an orthopedic surgeon, and her mother was one of the first female psychiatrists in the United States, in addition to being a professor at Columbia University.

Richards attended Horace Mann School and excelled as a wide receiver for the football team, a pitcher for the baseball team, and on the tennis and swim teams. Her baseball skills even led to an invitation to join the New York Yankees, but she decided to focus on tennis. After high school Richards attended Yale University and was captain of the men's tennis team, and was considered by some to be one of the best college tennis players in the country. After graduating from Yale in 1955, she went to the University of Rochester Medical Center and later specialized in ophthalmology by completing an ophthalmology residency, graduating in 1959 and serving a two-year internship at Lenox Hill Hospital in New York. After an internship, she served two years of residency at the Manhattan Eye, Ear and Throat Hospital in New York. She played competitive tennis for a while and was ranked sixth out of the top 20 males over 35. After an internship and residency, she joined the United States Navy to continue medical training and played tennis in the Navy. While serving in the Navy, she won both the singles and doubles at the All Navy Championship, with a very effective left-hand serve. During this time she was ranked as high as fourth in the region.

== Transition ==
During college Richards began dressing as a woman, which at the time was considered to be a perversion, with transsexualism classified as a form of insanity. Richards named her female persona "Renée", which is French for "reborn". Her struggle with gender identity created sexual confusion, depression, and suicidal tendencies. She began seeing Dr. Charles Ihlenfeld, a disciple of Harry Benjamin who specialized in endocrinology, transsexualism, and sexual reassignment. Upon seeing Ihlenfeld she began getting hormone injections with the long-term hope for a life change. In the mid-1960s she traveled in Europe dressed as a woman, intending to go to North Africa to see Georges Burou, a famous gynecological surgeon at Clinique Parc in Casablanca, Morocco, regarding sex reassignment surgery; however, she ultimately decided against it and returned to New York. Richards married model Barbara Mole in June 1970, and together they had a son Nicholas in 1972. They were divorced in 1975.

In the early 1970s, Richards resolved to undergo sex reassignment and was referred to surgeon Roberto C. Granato Sr. by Harry Benjamin, transitioning in 1975. (Granato had practiced in Argentina in the 1950s but had moved his practice to New York in the 1960s.) After surgery, Richards went to Newport Beach, California, and started working as an ophthalmologist in practice with another doctor.

== Court case ==
In 1976, Richards's gender reassignment was outed by local TV anchor Richard Carlson, the father of Tucker Carlson. Subsequently, the United States Tennis Association (USTA), the Women's Tennis Association (WTA), and the United States Open Committee (USOC) required all female competitors to verify their sex with a Barr body test of their chromosomes. Richards applied to play in the US Open in 1976 as a woman, but refused to take the test, and thus was not allowed to compete in the Open, Wimbledon, or the Italian Open in the summer of 1976.

Richards then sued the United States Tennis Association (USTA), which runs the US Open, in New York state court, alleging discrimination by gender in violation of the New York Human Rights Law. She asserted that participating in the tournament would constitute "an acceptance of her right to be a woman." Some USTA members felt that others would undergo sex change to enter women's tennis. Sports Illustrated called Richards an "extraordinary spectacle", and characterized reactions to her as "varying from astonishment to suspicion, sympathy, resentment, and more often than not, utter confusion." The USOC stated "there is competitive advantage for a male who has undergone a sex change surgery as a result of physical training and development as a male." Richards finally agreed to take the Barr body test. The test results were ambiguous. She refused to take it again and was barred from play.

On August 16, 1977, Judge Alfred M. Ascione found in Richards's favor. He ruled: "This person is now a female" and that requiring Richards to pass the Barr body test was "grossly unfair, discriminatory and inequitable, and a violation of her rights." He further ruled that the USTA intentionally discriminated against Richards, and granted Richards an injunction against the USTA and the USOC, allowing her to play in the US Open. On September 1, 1977, Richards lost to Virginia Wade in the first round of the singles competition. Partnered with Betty Ann Stuart, Richards made it to the finals in doubles; Richards and Stuart lost the finals to Martina Navratilova and Betty Stöve.

== Tennis career after transitioning ==
External videos
- Interview with Renee Richards on The Robert MacNeil Report; Transexuality and Sports 1976-08-23, American Archive of Public Broadcasting (WGBH and the Library of Congress), Boston, MA and Washington, DC

After moving to California, Richards played in regional competitions for her local club, the John Wayne Tennis Club, under the name Renée Clark. In the summer of 1976 she entered the La Jolla Tennis Championships, where she crushed the competition, and her unique left hand serve was recognized by Bob Perry, a tour player from UCLA. Her long-time friend Gene Scott then invited her to play in his professional tennis tournament, the Tennis Week Open in South Orange, New Jersey. The USTA and the WTA then withdrew their sanction for the Tennis Week Open, and organized another tournament; 25 of the 32 participants withdrew from the Tennis Week Open. This was the beginning of the issues Richards encountered in trying to play professional women's tennis, which led to her successful lawsuit against the USTA.

Richards played professionally from 1977 to 1981 when she retired at age 47. She was ranked as high as 20th overall (in February 1979), and her highest ranking at the end of a year was 22nd (in 1977). Her first professional event as a female was the 1977 U.S. Open. Her greatest successes on court were reaching the doubles final at her first U.S. Open in 1977, with Betty Ann Grubb Stuart – the pair lost a close match to Martina Navratilova and Betty Stöve – and winning the 35-and-over women's singles. Richards was twice a semifinalist in mixed doubles, with Ilie Năstase, at the U.S. Open. In 1979, she defeated Nancy Richey for the 35-and-over singles title at the Open. Richards posted wins over Hana Mandlíková, Sylvia Hanika, Virginia Ruzici, and Pam Shriver. She later coached Navratilova to two Wimbledon wins (1982 and 1983).

Richards was inducted into the USTA Eastern Tennis Hall of Fame in 2000. On August 2, 2013, Richards was among the first class of inductees into the National Gay and Lesbian Sports Hall of Fame.

Richards has since expressed ambivalence about her legacy, and came to believe her past as a man provided her with advantages over her competitors, saying "Having lived for the past 30 years, I know if I'd had surgery at the age of 22, and then at 24 went on the tour, no genetic woman in the world would have been able to come close to me. And so I've reconsidered my opinion."

== Life after tennis ==
After four years of playing tennis, she decided to return to her medical practice, which she moved to Park Avenue in New York. She became the surgeon director of ophthalmology and head of the eye-muscle clinic at the Manhattan Eye, Ear and Throat Hospital. She was on the editorial board of the Journal of Pediatric Ophthalmology and Strabismus. In 2007, she lived in a small town north of New York City with her platonic companion and assistant, Arleen Larzelere.

In 2014, at the age of 80, she retired from performing eye surgery.

In 2014, a wooden racket used by her was donated to the National Museum of American History, which is part of the Smithsonian.

== Movies and books ==
In 1983, Richards published an autobiography, Second Serve, and in 2007, a second, No Way Renée: The Second Half of My Notorious Life, in which she expresses regret over the type of fame that came with her being transgender, although she said in 2007 that she did not regret undergoing the sex reassignment process in itself. In 2021, Richards continued her autobiography with Diary 1999: An Eye-Opening Medical Memoir. Richards's first autobiography served as the basis for the film Second Serve. Renée is a 2011 documentary film about Richards directed by Eric Drath. The film was one of the anchor films of the 2011 Tribeca Film Festival and the documentary premiered on ESPN on October 4, 2011.

In 2017, Richards was interviewed by Katie Couric near the end of the documentary Gender Revolution.

A biography of Richards, Finding Renée Richards: The Groundbreaking Story of Tennis’s Trans Pioneer by Julie Kliegman, was published in 2026 by HarperOne. The book received starred reviews from Publishers Weekly and Kirkus, and was among the top ten biographies reviewed in the past year by Booklist.

== Grand Slam performance timelines ==
Key
W	F	SF	QF	#R	RR	Q#	DNQ	A	NH

(W) winner; (F) finalist; (SF) semifinalist; (QF) quarterfinalist; (#R) rounds 4, 3, 2, 1; (RR) round-robin stage; (Q#) qualification round; (DNQ) did not qualify; (A) absent; (NH) not held; (SR) strike rate (events won / competed); (W–L) win–loss record.

Note: The Australian Open was held twice in 1977, in January and December.

=== Men's singles ===
Tournament	1953	1954	1955	1956	1957	1958	1959	1960	Career SR
Australia Championships	A	A	A	A	A	A	A	A	0 / 0
French Championships	A	A	A	A	A	A	A	A	0 / 0
Wimbledon	A	A	A	A	A	A	A	A	0 / 0
U.S. Championships	1R	A	2R	1R	2R	A	A	1R	0 / 5
SR	0 / 1	0 / 0	0 / 1	0 / 1	0 / 1	0 / 0	0 / 0	0 / 1	0 / 5

=== Women's singles ===
Tournament	1977	1978	1979	1980	1981	Career SR
Australian Open	A	A	A	A	A	0 / 0
French Open	A	A	A	A	A	0 / 0
Wimbledon	A	A	A	A	A	0 / 0
US Open	1R	1R	3R	2R	1R	0 / 5
SR	0 / 1	0 / 1	0 / 1	0 / 1	0 / 1	0 / 5

=== Women's doubles ===
Tournament	1977	1978	1979	1980	1981	Career SR
Australian Open	A	A	A	A	A	0 / 0
French Open	A	A	A	A	A	0 / 0
Wimbledon	A	A	A	A	A	0 / 0
US Open	F	2R	A	3R	3R	0 / 4
SR	0 / 1	0 / 1	0 / 0	0 / 1	0 / 1	0 / 4

=== Mixed doubles ===
Tournament	1977	1978	1979	1980	1981	Career SR
Australian Open	A	A	A	A	A	0 / 0
French Open	A	A	A	A	A	0 / 0
Wimbledon	A	A	A	A	A	0 / 0
US Open	A	3R	SF	1R	A	0 / 3
SR	0 / 0	0 / 1	0 / 1	0 / 1	0 / 0	0 / 3

== See also ==
- List of select Jewish tennis players
