= 1976 South African Open (tennis) =

- Date: 23–30 November
- Edition: 73rd
- Category: Grand Prix
- Draw: 64S / 32D
- Prize money: $150,000
- Surface: Hard / outdoor
- Location: Johannesburg, South Africa
- Venue: Ellis Park Tennis Stadium

Champions

Men's singles
- (United States) Harold Solomon

Women's singles
- (South Africa) Brigitte Cuypers

Men's doubles
- (United States) Brian Gottfried / (United States) Sherwood Stewart

Mixed doubles
- (United States) Betsy Nagelsen / (South Africa) Bob Hewitt
- South African Open

The 1976 South African Open, also known by its sponsored name South African Breweries Open, was a combined men's and women's tennis tournament played on outdoor hard courts in Johannesburg, South Africa that was part of the 1976 Commercial Union Assurance Grand Prix. It was the 73rd edition of the tournament and was held from 23 November through 30 November 1976. Harold Solomon and Brigitte Cuypers won the singles titles.

== Finals ==
=== Men's singles ===
(United States) Harold Solomon defeated (United States) Brian Gottfried 6–2, 6–7, 6–3, 6–4

=== Women's singles ===
(South Africa) Brigitte Cuypers defeated (United States) Laura duPont 6–7, 6–4, 6–1

=== Men's doubles ===
(United States) Brian Gottfried / (United States) Sherwood Stewart defeated (Spain) Juan Gisbert / (United States) Stan Smith 1–6, 6–1, 6–2, 7–6

=== Mixed doubles ===
(United States) Betsy Nagelsen / (South Africa) Bob Hewitt defeated (South Africa) Annette DuPlooy / (South Africa) Deon Joubert 6–2, 7–6
