= Brigitte Cuypers =

South African tennis player

- Full name: Brigitte Cuypers-Fourie
- Country (sports): South Africa
- Born: 3 December 1955 (age 70) Cape Town, South Africa
- Height: 1.69 m (5 ft 6 1/2 in)
- Plays: Right-handed

Singles
- Career record: 24–45
- Career titles: 3

Grand Slam singles results
- French Open: 3R (1977)
- Wimbledon: 3R (1978)
- US Open: 3R (1977)

Doubles
- Career record: 29–45
- Career titles: 3

Grand Slam doubles results
- French Open: 2R (1979)
- Wimbledon: QF (1977)
- US Open: 3R (1977, 1978, 1979)

Grand Slam mixed doubles results
- Wimbledon: 3R (1977)
- US Open: 2R (1978)

Brigitte Cuypers (born 3 December 1955) is a retired tennis player from South Africa.

Cuypers reached the final of the South African Championships singles event on five consecutive occasions from 1975 to 1979 and won the title in 1976, 1978 and 1979. In 1977, she won the doubles title at the Italian Open with compatriot Marise Kruger. In August 1979, she was runner–up at the Canadian Open, losing the final in three sets to Laura duPont.

Cuypers won the singles title at the Rhodesian Open in 1974 and 1975. She won the Akron Virginia Slims doubles title in 1976 with Mona Anne Guerrant.

== Career finals ==
=== Singles: 8 (3 titles, 5 runner-ups) ===
Result	W/L	Date	Tournament	Surface	Opponent	Score
Loss	0–1	Jun 1973	Chichester Tournament, England	Grass	(Australia) Dianne Fromholtz	1–6, 0–6
Loss	0–2	Nov 1975	South African Open, Johannesburg	Hard	(South Africa) Annette du Plooy	3–6, 6–3, 4–6
Loss	0–3	Aug 1976	U.S. Clay Court Open, Indianapolis	Hard	(United States) Kathy May	4–6, 6–4, 2–6
Win	1–3	Nov 1976	South African Open, Johannesburg	Hard	(United States) Laura duPont	6–7^{(5–7)}, 6–4, 6–1
Loss	1–4	Dec 1977	South African Open, Johannesburg	Hard	(South Africa) Linky Boshoff	1–6, 4–6
Win	2–4	Dec 1978	South African Open, Johannesburg	Hard	(United States) Linda Siegel	6–1, 6–0
Loss	2–5	Aug 1979	Canadian Open, Toronto	Hard	(United States) Laura duPont	4–6, 7–6^{(7–3)}, 1–6
Win	.3–5	Dec 1979	South African Open, Johannesburg	Hard	(South Africa) Tanya Harford	7–6, 6–2

=== Doubles: 3 (3 titles) ===
Result	W/L	Date	Tournament	Surface	Partner	Opponent	Score
Win	1–0	Feb 1976	Virginia Slims of Akron, Richfield	Carpet (i)	(United States) Mona Guerrant	(United Kingdom) Glynis Coles (Romania) Florența Mihai	6–4, 7–6
Win	2–0	Jun 1976	Kent Championships, Beckenham	Grass	(South Africa) Annette Du Plooy	(Soviet Union) Natasha Chmyreva (Soviet Union) Olga Morozova	9–7, 6–4
Win	3–0	May 1977	Italian Open, Rome	Clay	(South Africa) Marise Kruger	(United States) Bunny Bruning (United States) Sharon Walsh	3–6, 7–5, 6–2
