= Betty Ann Grubb Stuart =

American tennis player

- Country (sports): United States
- Born: February 26, 1950 (age 75) Newport Beach, California, United States
- Height: 5 ft 9 in (1.75 m)
- Plays: Right-handed

Singles
- Career record: 25–41

Grand Slam singles results
- French Open: 3R (1979)
- Wimbledon: 3R (1970, 1979, 1980)
- US Open: 2R (1969)

Doubles
- Career record: 51–39
- Career titles: 1

Betty Ann Grubb Stuart (born February 26, 1950) is an American retired professional tennis player. She had her most significant success in doubles, including reaching the final of the 1977 US Open with Renée Richards as her partner.

== Personal life ==
Stuart has been married four times. Her second husband was Ken Stuart. Her third husband was Australian tennis player Phil Dent, and she is the mother of American tennis players Brett Hansen-Dent and Taylor Dent. Her niece is professional beach volleyball player Misty May-Treanor.

== WTA Tour finals ==
=== Doubles 7 (1/6) ===
Legend
| Grand Slam | 0 |
| WTA Championships | 0 |
| Tier I | 0 |
| Tier II | 0 |
| Tier III | 0 |
| Tier IV & V | 0 |

| Result | W/L | Date | Tournament | Surface | Partner | Opponents | Score |
|---|---|---|---|---|---|---|---|
| Loss | 0–1 | Sep 1975 | Mission Viejo, California, US | Hard | (United States) Gail Glasgow | (United States) Chris Evert (Czechoslovakia) Martina Navratilova | 3–6, 5–7 |
| Loss | 0–2 | Aug 1977 | US Open, Forest Hills, New York, US | Clay | (United States) Renée Richards | (Netherlands) Betty Stöve (United States) Martina Navratilova | 1–6, 6–7 |
| Win | 1–2 | Jan 1979 | Chicago, Illinois, US | Carpet | (United States) Rosie Casals | (South Africa) Ilana Kloss (South Africa) Greer Stevens | 3–6, 7–5, 7–5 |
| Loss | 1–3 | May 1979 | Vienna, Austria | Clay | (South Africa) Ilana Kloss | (South Africa) Marise Kruger (Australia) Dianne Fromholtz | 6–3, 4–6, 1–6 |
| Loss | 1–4 | Jun 1979 | Eastbourne, England | Grass | (South Africa) Ilana Kloss | (Netherlands) Betty Stöve (Australia) Wendy Turnbull | 2–6, 2–6 |
| Loss | 1–5 | Jul 1979 | San Diego, California, US | Hard | (United States) Ann Kiyomura | (United States) Rosie Casals (United States) Martina Navratilova | 6–3, 4–6, 2–6 |
| Loss | 1–6 | Oct 1979 | Tampa, Florida, US | Hard | (South Africa) Ilana Kloss | (United States) Anne Smith (Romania) Virginia Ruzici | 5–7, 6–4, 5–7 |
