= 1977 US Open (tennis) =

- Date: August 29 – September 11
- Edition: 97th
- Category: Grand Slam (ITF)
- Surface: Clay / outdoor
- Location: Forest Hills, Queens, United States
- Venue: West Side Tennis Club

Champions

Men's singles
- (Argentina) Guillermo Vilas

Women's singles
- (United States) Chris Evert

Men's doubles
- (South Africa) Bob Hewitt / (South Africa) Frew McMillan

Women's doubles
- (United States) Martina Navratilova / (Netherlands) Betty Stöve

Mixed doubles
- (Netherlands) Betty Stöve / (South Africa) Frew McMillan
- US Open

The 1977 US Open was a tennis tournament that took place on the outdoor clay courts at the West Side Tennis Club in Forest Hills, Queens, in New York City, New York. The tournament was held from August 29 until September 11, 1977. It was the 97th staging of the US Open, and the fourth Grand Slam tennis event of 1977. This was the third and final year in which the US Open was played on clay courts. After 68 years, it was the final time the championship was played at the West Side Tennis Club in Forest Hills before moving to Flushing Meadows for the 1978 tournament.

== Seniors ==
=== Men's singles ===
(Argentina) Guillermo Vilas defeated (United States) Jimmy Connors 2–6, 6–3, 7–6^{(7-4)}, 6–0

- It was Vilas' second career Grand Slam title and his first (and only) US Open title. He was the first Argentine tennis player to win the US Open.

=== Women's singles ===
(United States) Chris Evert defeated (Australia) Wendy Turnbull 7–6, 6–2

- It was Evert's seventh career Grand Slam title and her third (consecutive) US Open title.

=== Men's doubles ===
(South Africa) Bob Hewitt / (South Africa) Frew McMillan defeated (United States) Brian Gottfried / (Mexico) Raúl Ramírez 6–4, 6–0

=== Women's doubles ===
(United States) Martina Navratilova / (Netherlands) Betty Stöve defeated (United States) Renee Richards / (United States) Betty-Ann Stuart 6–1, 7–6

=== Mixed doubles ===
(Netherlands) Betty Stöve / (South Africa) Frew McMillan defeated (United States) Billie Jean King / (United States) Vitas Gerulaitis 6–2, 3–6, 6–3

== Juniors ==
=== Boys' singles ===
(United States) Van Winitsky defeated (United States) Eliot Teltscher 6–4, 6–4

=== Girls' singles ===
(Argentina) Claudia Casabianca defeated (United States) Lea Antonoplis 6–3, 2–6, 6–2

Preceded by 1977 Wimbledon Championships	Grand Slams	Succeeded by 1977 Australian Open
