= WTA Atlanta =

Defunct tennis tournament
- Event name: Little Mo Classic (1975); Wyler's Classic (1977–78); Davison's Classic (1979–80); Toyota Classic (1981–82); Virginia Slims of Atlanta (1983)
- Tour: WTA Tour
- Founded: 1975
- Abolished: 1983
- Editions: 8
- Surface: Carpet (1975–81); Hard (1982–83)

The WTA Atlanta is a defunct WTA Tour affiliated tennis tournament played from 1975 to 1983. It was held in Atlanta in the United States and played on indoor carpet courts from 1975 to 1981 and outdoor hard courts from 1982 to 1983.

== Finals ==
=== Singles ===
Year	Champions	Runners-up	Score
1975	(United States) Chris Evert	(United States) Martina Navratilova	2–6, 6–2, 6–0
1976	Not held		
1977	(United States) Chris Evert	(Australia) Dianne Fromholtz	6–3, 6–2
1978	(United States) Chris Evert	(United States) Martina Navratilova	7–6^{(7–3)}, 0–6, 6–3
1979	(United States) Martina Navratilova	(Australia) Wendy Turnbull	7–6^{(8–6)}, 6–4
1980	(Czechoslovakia) Hana Mandlíková	(Australia) Wendy Turnbull	6–3, 7–5
1981	(United States) Tracy Austin	(United States) Mary Lou Piatek	4–6, 6–3, 6–3
1982	(United States) Chris Evert-Lloyd	(United States) Susan Mascarin	6–3, 6–1
1983	(United States) Pam Shriver	(United States) Kathy Jordan	6–2, 6–0

=== Doubles ===
Year	Champions	Runners-up	Score
1975	(United States) Chris Evert (Czechoslovakia) Martina Navratilova	(France) Françoise Dürr (Netherlands) Betty Stöve	6–4, 5–7, 6–2
1976	Not held		
1977	(United States) Martina Navratilova (Netherlands) Betty Stöve	(South Africa) Brigitte Cuypers (South Africa) Marise Kruger	6–4, 6–2
1978	(France) Françoise Dürr (United Kingdom) Virginia Wade	(United States) Martina Navratilova (United States) Anne Smith	4–6, 6–2, 6–4
1979	(Australia) Wendy Turnbull (Netherlands) Betty Stöve	(United States) Ann Kiyomura (United States) Anne Smith	6–2, 6–4
1980	(United States) Barbara Potter (United States) Sharon Walsh	(United States) Kathy Jordan (United States) Anne Smith	6–3, 6–1
1981	(United States) Laura duPont (United States) Betsy Nagelsen	(United States) Rosie Casals (United States) Candy Reynolds	6–4, 7–5
1982	(United States) Kathy Jordan (United States) Betsy Nagelsen	(United States) Chris Evert-Lloyd (United States) Billie Jean King	4–6, 7–6^{(13–11)}, 7–6^{(7–3)}
1983	(United States) Alycia Moulton (United States) Sharon Walsh	(United States) Rosie Casals (Australia) Wendy Turnbull	6–3, 7–6^{(7–1)}

== See also ==
- Atlanta WCT – men's tournament (1970–1976)
- Atlanta Open – men's tournament (since 2010)
