= Lele Forood =

American tennis player and coach

- Born: September 10, 1956 (age 69); San Francisco, California, US
- Education: Stanford University
- Occupation: College Tennis Coach
- Years active: 2001–2024

Lele Forood (born 10 September 1956) is the former Peter and Helen Bing director of women's tennis at Stanford University. She was the head coach from 2001-2024 before announcing her retirement. During her tenure at Stanford, her teams won 10 NCAA Championships. Prior to her coaching career, she was a top amateur and college tennis player. As a professional, she is best known for reaching the doubles semifinals at the 1977 US Open and at the 1978 US Open, upsetting reigning Wimbledon champion Virginia Wade. Forood reached a high ranking in singles of No. 30.

== Amateur/College years ==
Forood was the high school state champion in Florida, then became a student at Stanford in 1974. She became a pro tennis player after her sophomore year in college, then returned to Stanford University and graduated in 1979 with a degree in sociology.

While playing at Stanford, she was named an All-American in 1976. She also was a National Collegiate singles finalist as a freshman and a semifinalist during her sophomore campaign in leading Stanford to two second place national finishes.

== Pro career ==
In 1976, she and Raquel Giscafré reached the doubles semifinals at the US Open. Two years later, at the 1978 US Open, she upset third-seeded Virginia Wade in three sets in the third round. Forood won gold in singles and doubles in the 1975 Pan American Games.

Forood was a member of the Board of Women's Tennis Association from 1979 to 1987 and served as its secretary-treasurer from 1983 to 1987. She was the recipient of the WTA Player Service Award in 1983. After the tour and before coming back to Stanford, she promoted the first professional women's tour event in France from 1986 to 1988 in Strasbourg.

== Coaching career ==
Forood was hired as an assistant coach at Stanford under Frank Brennan, who coached her as a junior and as a pro. During this time, Forood was recognized in 1997 as the ITA Division I National Assistant Coach of the Year.

When Brennan retired as head coach after the 2000 season, Forood took his place. In 2001, her first year as head coach, Stanford won the NCAA championship, making her the first female coach to win the NCAA team title in tennis. Her team appeared in the NCAA tournament every year since she began coaching in 2001 (except for the shortened 2020 season due to COVID-19), and her team won 10 national titles. Upon her retirement at the end of the 2024 season, she amassed a record of 560-63. Her teams also accomplished an 89-match winning streak across three seasons (2004–2006), and their home court 184-match winning streak at Stanford's Taube Family Tennis Stadium, which extended from the 1999 season to the finals of the NCAA championship in 2011 is one of the longest home winning streaks for any intercollegiate sport in NCAA Division I history.

Among the top tennis players who played for her at Stanford were Nicole Gibbs, Mallory Burdette, Amber Liu and Kristie Ahn.

== Head coaching record at Stanford ==
Year	Record	NCAA Results
2001	30-0, 8-0 Pac-10	NCAA Champions
2002	27-1, 8-0 Pac-10	NCAA Champions
2003	25-2, 8-0 Pac-10	NCAA Runner-Up
2004	29-0, 8-0 Pac-10	NCAA Champions
2005	27-0, 7-0 Pac-10 Champions	NCAA Champions
2006	30-0, 8-0 Pac-10 Champions	NCAA Champions
2007	24-2, 8-0 Pac-10 Champions	NCAA Semifinals
2008	22-5, 7-1 Pac-10	NCAA Quarterfinals
2009	19-5, 6-2 Pac-10	NCAA Round of 16
2010	26-1, 8-0 Pac-10	NCAA Champions
2011	28-1, 8-0 Pac-10	NCAA Runner-Up
2012	21-2, 9-1 Pac-12	NCAA Quarterfinals
2013	22-4, 8-2 Pac-12	NCAA Champions
2014	20-3, 8-2 Pac-12	NCAA Semifinals
2015	18-6, 7-3 Pac-12	NCAA Quarterfinals
2016	20-5, 9-1 Pac-12	NCAA Champions
2017	26-3, 10-0 Pac-12	NCAA Runner-Up
2018	24-3, 9-0 Pac-12	NCAA Champions
2019	28-1, 10-0 Pac-12	NCAA Champions
2020	10-2, 1-1 Pac-12	Season canceled in March due to Covid pandemic
2021	15-5, 8-2 Pac-12	NCAA 2nd Round
2022	19-6, 7-2 Pac-12	NCAA Super Regionals
2023	25-3, 10-0 Pac-12	NCAA Semifinals
2024	25-3, 8-1 Pac-12 Champions	NCAA Quarterfinals
