= 1984 Wimbledon Championships – Women's singles qualifying =

Women's singles qualifying
- 1984 Wimbledon Championships

Events
| Singles | men | women | | boys | girls |
| Doubles | men | women | mixed | boys | girls |
| WC Singles | men | women | quad |
| WC Doubles | men | women | quad |
| Legends | men | women | seniors |

Qualification
| Singles | men | women |
| Doubles | men | women | mixed |
- Wimbledon Championships

Players and pairs who neither have high enough rankings nor receive wild cards may participate in a qualifying tournament held one week before the annual Wimbledon Tennis Championships.

== Qualifiers ==
1. (Soviet Union) Svetlana Cherneva
2. (Sweden) Carina Karlsson
3. (Soviet Union) Larisa Savchenko
4. (United States) Kim Steinmetz
5. (United States) Candy Reynolds
6. (United States) Kris Kinney
7. (Soviet Union) Elena Eliseenko
8. (Canada) Hélène Pelletier

== Qualifying draw ==
=== First qualifier ===
First round
(West Germany) Petra Keppeler | 6 | 6 | 3
(Australia) Jenny Byrne | 2 | 7 | 6
(Australia) Vicki Marler | 1 | 2
(United States) Betsy Heidenberger | 6 | 6
(United Kingdom) Elizabeth Jones | 6 | 6
(Republic of Ireland) Jo Griffiths | 1 | 0
(Switzerland) Hana Strachoňová | 6 | 6 | 2
(Soviet Union) Svetlana Cherneva | 4 | 7 | 6

Second round
(Australia) Jenny Byrne | 6 | 6
(United States) Betsy Heidenberger | 2 | 1
(United Kingdom) Elizabeth Jones | 6 | 5 | 4
(Soviet Union) Svetlana Cherneva | 3 | 7 | 6

Qualifying competition
(Australia) Jenny Byrne | 5 | 6
(Soviet Union) Svetlana Cherneva | 7 | 7

=== Second qualifier ===
First round
(United States) Stacy Margolin | 6 | 6
(Netherlands) Judith Warringa | 2 | 1
(United Kingdom) Belinda Borneo | 2 | 3
(Sweden) Carina Karlsson | 6 | 6
(United States) Carol Christian | 6 | 7
(United States) Karin Huebner | 1 | 6
(Canada) Marianne Groat | 1 | 1
(Socialist Federal Republic of Yugoslavia) Renata Šašak | 6 | 6

Second round
(United States) Stacy Margolin | 5 | 1
(Sweden) Carina Karlsson | 7 | 6
(United States) Carol Christian | 6 | 7
(Socialist Federal Republic of Yugoslavia) Renata Šašak | 3 | 6

Qualifying competition
(Sweden) Carina Karlsson | 6 | 6
(United States) Carol Christian | 1 | 3

=== Third qualifier ===
First round
(Soviet Union) Larisa Savchenko | 6 | 6
(Hungary) Csilla Bartos | 2 | 4
(Brazil) Luciana Corsato | 6 | 2 | 3
(Australia) Natalia Leipus | 2 | 6 | 6
(United Kingdom) Glynis Coles | 4 | 3
(Sweden) Elisabeth Ekblom | 6 | 6
(Hungary) Marie Pinterová | 1 | 6 | 6
(Australia) Pam Whytcross | 6 | 4 | 3

Second round
(Soviet Union) Larisa Savchenko | 3 | 6 | 6
(Australia) Natalia Leipus | 6 | 0 | 1
(Sweden) Elisabeth Ekblom | 6 | 3 | 6
(Hungary) Marie Pinterová | 2 | 6 | 2

Qualifying competition
(Soviet Union) Larisa Savchenko | 6 | 6
(Sweden) Elisabeth Ekblom | 3 | 3

=== Fourth qualifier ===
First round
(United States) Kim Steinmetz | 7 | 6
(United Kingdom) Lorrayne Gracie | 5 | 3
(United States) Penny Barg | 2 | 2
(United States) Renee Blount | 6 | 6
(Australia) Nerida Gregory | 2 | 3
(United States) Caryn Copeland | 6 | 6
(United States) Helena Manset | 6 | 1 | 9
(United States) Molly Van Nostrand | 4 | 6 | 7

Second round
(United States) Kim Steinmetz | 6 | 6
(United States) Renee Blount | 4 | 4
(United States) Caryn Copeland | 7 | 6
(United States) Helena Manset | 6 | 2

Qualifying competition
(United States) Kim Steinmetz | 6 | 7
(United States) Caryn Copeland | 4 | 6

=== Fifth qualifier ===
First round
(United States) Candy Reynolds | 6 | 6
(Brazil) Niege Dias | 2 | 1
(Switzerland) Eva Krapl | 6 | 6
(United Kingdom) Denise Parnell | 4 | 0
(United States) Ronni Reis | 1 | 3
(United States) Susan Rimes | 6 | 6
(Japan) Naoko Sato | 2 | 6 | 1
(West Germany) Andrea Betzner | 6 | 2 | 6

Second round
(United States) Candy Reynolds | 6 | 6
(Switzerland) Eva Krapl | 3 | 2
(United States) Susan Rimes | 6 | 6
(West Germany) Andrea Betzner | 2 | 3

Qualifying competition
(United States) Candy Reynolds
(United States) Susan Rimes

=== Sixth qualifier ===
First round
(United States) Shawn Foltz | 6 | 6 | 6
(United Kingdom) Ellinore Lightbody | 7 | 3 | 3
(United Kingdom) Linda Geeves | 1 | 0
(Canada) Jill Hetherington | 6 | 6
(Czechoslovakia) Renáta Tomanová | 6 | 6 | 1
(United States) Kris Kinney | 3 | 7 | 6
(United States) Mary-Ann Colville | 6 | 6
(Hong Kong) Patricia Hy | 2 | 3

Second round
(United States) Shawn Foltz | 6 | 6
(Canada) Jill Hetherington | 1 | 0
(United States) Kris Kinney | 6 | 6
(United States) Mary-Ann Colville | 3 | 3

Qualifying competition
(United States) Shawn Foltz | 6 | 4
(United States) Kris Kinney | 7 | 6

=== Seventh qualifier ===
First round
(Soviet Union) Elena Eliseenko | 7 | 6
(United States) Lisa Spain-Short | 5 | 3
(New Zealand) Brenda Perry | 3 | 6 | 6
(Australia) Annette Gulley | 6 | 2 | 4
(United States) Beth Norton | 7 | 5 | 5
(United Kingdom) Cathy Drury | 5 | 7 | 7
(South Africa) Kim Seddon | 2 | 1
(Australia) Elizabeth Minter | 6 | 6

Second round
(Soviet Union) Elena Eliseenko | 6 | 6
(New Zealand) Brenda Perry | 0 | 1
(United Kingdom) Cathy Drury | 3 | 1
(Australia) Elizabeth Minter | 6 | 6

Qualifying competition
(Soviet Union) Elena Eliseenko | 6 | 6
(Australia) Elizabeth Minter | 3 | 2

=== Eighth qualifier ===
First round
(United States) Laura Bernstein | 6 | 1 | 6
(United Kingdom) Catherine Berry | 2 | 6 | 4
(Canada) Hélène Pelletier | 6 | 6
(United States) Maeve Quinlan | 3 | 4
(Argentina) Adriana Villagrán | 6 | 4
(United States) Heather Crowe | 7 | 6
(Australia) Brenda Remilton | 6 | 6
(Japan) Masako Yanagi | 4 | 4

Second round
(United States) Laura Bernstein | 3 | 4
(Canada) Hélène Pelletier | 6 | 6
(United States) Heather Crowe | 6 | 5 | 6
(Australia) Brenda Remilton | 3 | 7 | 4

Qualifying competition
(Canada) Hélène Pelletier
(United States) Heather Crowe
