= 1984 Wimbledon Championships – Men's singles qualifying =

Men's singles qualifying
- 1984 Wimbledon Championships

Events
Singles	men	women		boys	girls
Doubles	men	women	mixed	boys	girls
WC Singles	men	women	quad
WC Doubles	men	women	quad
Legends	men	women	seniors

Qualification
Singles	men	women
Doubles	men	women	mixed
- Wimbledon Championships

Players and pairs who neither have high enough rankings nor receive wild cards may participate in a qualifying tournament held one week before the annual Wimbledon Tennis Championships.

== Seeds ==
1. (United States) Bruce Manson (qualified)
2. (Netherlands) Michiel Schapers (qualifying competition, lucky loser)
3. (Switzerland) Claudio Mezzadri (qualifying competition, lucky loser)
4. (New Zealand) David Mustard (second round)
5. (United States) Todd Nelson (first round)
6. (United States) Tom Cain (qualified)
7. (Australia) Peter Doohan (second round)
8. (Israel) Shahar Perkiss (qualifying competition, lucky loser)
9. (United States) Andy Andrews (second round)
10. (Brazil) Carlos Kirmayr (qualified)
11. (South Africa) Eddie Edwards (qualified)
12. (United States) Mike De Palmer (qualifying competition)
13. (United States) David Dowlen (qualifying competition)
14. (United States) Butch Walts (second round)
15. (United States) Drew Gitlin (second round)
16. (West Germany) Eric Jelen (first round)
17. (United States) Jeff Borowiak (first round)
18. (West Germany) Jaromir Becka (second round)
19. (West Germany) Boris Becker (qualified)
20. (United States) Richard Meyer (first round)
21. (United States) Randy Nixon (second round)
22. (United States) John Mattke (second round)
23. (Australia) Broderick Dyke (second round)
24. (Australia) Craig A. Miller (qualified)
25. (Australia) Kim Warwick (qualifying competition)
26. (New Zealand) Russell Simpson (qualified)
27. (Australia) Chris Johnstone (qualifying competition)
28. (South Africa) Brian Levine (first round)
29. (United States) Jonathan Canter (first round)
30. (United States) Paul Annacone (qualified)
31. (United States) Ken Flach (qualified)
32. (United States) Charles Strode (first round)

== Qualifiers ==
1. (United States) Bruce Manson
2. (United States) Craig Wittus
3. (United States) Sherwood Stewart
4. (West Germany) Boris Becker
5. (New Zealand) Russell Simpson
6. (United States) Tom Cain
7. (United States) Ken Flach
8. (France) Guy Forget
9. (Australia) Craig A. Miller
10. (Brazil) Carlos Kirmayr
11. (South Africa) Eddie Edwards
12. (United States) Bud Cox
13. (United States) Paul Annacone
14. (South Africa) Christo van Rensburg
15. (United States) Jeff Turpin
16. (Australia) Mark Kratzmann

== Lucky losers ==
1. (Netherlands) Michiel Schapers
2. (Switzerland) Claudio Mezzadri
3. (Israel) Shahar Perkiss

== Qualifying draw ==
=== First qualifier ===
First round
1	(United States) Bruce Manson	6	6
(United Kingdom) Clive Martin	3	0
(United States) Victor Amaya	3	3
(United States) Mark Groetsch	6	6
(United States) Peter Rennert	6	6
(United Kingdom) Paul Reekie	2	3
(United Kingdom) David Felgate	0	4
18	(West Germany) Jaromir Becka	6	6

Second round
1	(United States) Bruce Manson	6	6
(United States) Mark Groetsch	3	1
(United States) Peter Rennert	6	6
18	(West Germany) Jaromir Becka	3	4

Qualifying competition
1	(United States) Bruce Manson	4	4	6	7	6
(United States) Peter Rennert	6	6	3	6	3

=== Second qualifier ===
First round
2	(Netherlands) Michiel Schapers	7	6
(United Kingdom) Mark Blincow	6	1
(United States) Tim Garcia	3	4
(United States) Tracy Delatte	6	6
(South Africa) David Sammel	7	3	6
(France) Nicolas Sido	6	6	4
(United States) Craig Wittus	6	6
28	(South Africa) Brian Levine	4	4

Second round
2	(Netherlands) Michiel Schapers	6	6
(United States) Tracy Delatte	2	3
(South Africa) David Sammel	5	1
(United States) Craig Wittus	7	6

Qualifying competition
2	(Netherlands) Michiel Schapers	3	4	4
(United States) Craig Wittus	6	6	6

=== Third qualifier ===
First round
3	(Switzerland) Claudio Mezzadri	6	6
(United Kingdom) J Preston	0	1
(United Kingdom) Martin Bromfield	4	6
(United Kingdom) Michael Collins	6	7
(United States) Sherwood Stewart	4	6	12
(United States) Garth Haynes	6	3	10
(South Africa) Denys Maasdorp	7	6
17	(United States) Jeff Borowiak	5	3

Second round
3	(Switzerland) Claudio Mezzadri	6	7
(United Kingdom) Michael Collins	4	6
(United States) Sherwood Stewart	6	6	6
(South Africa) Denys Maasdorp	3	7	3

Qualifying competition
3	(Switzerland) Claudio Mezzadri	3	7	3	4
(United States) Sherwood Stewart	6	6	6	6

=== Fourth qualifier ===
First round
4	(New Zealand) David Mustard	6	6	6
(United Kingdom) Leighton Alfred	7	3	3
(United Kingdom) Mike Walker	6	2	5
(United States) Bruce Kleege	3	6	7
(Japan) Shozo Shiraishi	6	6
(Australia) David Graham	3	1
(Australia) Greg Whitecross	4	4
19	(West Germany) Boris Becker	6	6

Second round
4	(New Zealand) David Mustard	4	6	4
(United States) Bruce Kleege	6	4	6
(Japan) Shozo Shiraishi	4	4
19	(West Germany) Boris Becker	6	6

Qualifying competition
(United States) Bruce Kleege	4	3	3
19	(West Germany) Boris Becker	6	6	6

=== Fifth qualifier ===
First round
5	(United States) Todd Nelson	6	4	4
(India) Sashi Menon	4	6	6
(New Zealand) Mark Lewis	7	6
(United States) James Rubin	6	2
(United Kingdom) Julian Godfrey	6	3
(Australia) Brett Custer	7	6
(United Kingdom) Paul French	3	6
26	(New Zealand) Russell Simpson	6	7

Second round
(India) Sashi Menon	6	6
(New Zealand) Mark Lewis	4	3
(Australia) Brett Custer	3	2
26	(New Zealand) Russell Simpson	6	6

Qualifying competition
(India) Sashi Menon	6	6	6	0	4
26	(New Zealand) Russell Simpson	4	3	7	6	6

=== Sixth qualifier ===
First round
6	(United States) Tom Cain	4	6	6
(United Kingdom) John Whiteford	6	3	2
(United Kingdom) Richard Whichello	6	7
(Australia) David Macpherson	1	6
(France) François Errard	5	7	6
(United States) Robert Nelson	7	5	4
(United States) Andy Kohlberg	4	2
25	(Australia) Kim Warwick	6	6

Second round
6	(United States) Tom Cain	6	6
(United Kingdom) Richard Whichello	1	2
(France) François Errard	5	3
25	(Australia) Kim Warwick	7	6

Qualifying competition
6	(United States) Tom Cain	7	7	6
25	(Australia) Kim Warwick	6	6	0

=== Seventh qualifier ===
First round
7	(Australia) Peter Doohan	7	3	3
(United Kingdom) Clifford Bloxham	6	6	2^{r}
(Australia) Wayne Hampson	6	6
(Chile) Manuel Rodríguez	4	1
(United States) Derrick Rostagno	6	6
(Brazil) Ney Keller	3	4
(United Kingdom) Paul Hand	2	4
31	(United States) Ken Flach	6	6

Second round
7	(Australia) Peter Doohan	6	4	5
(Australia) Wayne Hampson	4	6	7
(United States) Derrick Rostagno	6	2
31	(United States) Ken Flach	7	6

Qualifying competition
(Australia) Wayne Hampson	3	6	3	6	7
31	(United States) Ken Flach	6	1	6	1	9

=== Eighth qualifier ===
First round
8	(Israel) Shahar Perkiss	7	7
(Australia) Michael Fancutt	6	5
(South Africa) Marius Masencamp	7	6
(Brazil) Eduardo Oncins	5	3
(United Kingdom) Andrew Pisker	2	2
(France) Guy Forget	6	6
(Japan) Shinichi Sakamoto	6	6
32	(United States) Charles Strode	0	3

Second round
8	(Israel) Shahar Perkiss	6	6
(South Africa) Marius Masencamp	1	4
(France) Guy Forget	6	7
(Japan) Shinichi Sakamoto	3	5

Qualifying competition
8	(Israel) Shahar Perkiss	4	3	6	6
(France) Guy Forget	6	6	1	7

=== Ninth qualifier ===
First round
9	(United States) Andy Andrews	6	7
(United Kingdom) Anton Lakatos	2	5
(United States) Chris Dunk	6	6
(United Kingdom) Mark Holland	4	4
(United Kingdom) Simon Jones	3	6	3
(Australia) Mike Baroch	6	3	6
(United Kingdom) Timothy Robson	3	4
24	(Australia) Craig A. Miller	6	6

Second round
9	(United States) Andy Andrews	6	1
(United States) Chris Dunk	7	6
(Australia) Mike Baroch	3	2
24	(Australia) Craig A. Miller	6	6

Qualifying competition
(United States) Chris Dunk	4	7	2	3
24	(Australia) Craig A. Miller	6	6	6	6

=== Tenth qualifier ===
First round
10	(Brazil) Carlos Kirmayr	6	6	7
(Italy) Paolo Canè	7	4	5
(Australia) Russell Barlow	6	3
(Sweden) Ronnie Båthman	7	6
(United Kingdom) Mark Blincow	3	6	3
(South Africa) Stefan Kruger	6	2	6
(South Africa) Christo van Rensburg	3	7	9
20	(United States) Richard Meyer	6	6	7

Second round
10	(Brazil) Carlos Kirmayr	6	3	7
(Sweden) Ronnie Båthman	3	6	5
(South Africa) Stefan Kruger	5	6	6
(South Africa) Christo van Rensburg	7	2	3

Qualifying competition
10	(Brazil) Carlos Kirmayr	6	6	6
(South Africa) Stefan Kruger	4	2	2

=== Eleventh qualifier ===
First round
11	(South Africa) Eddie Edwards	6	6
(United Kingdom) Yashpal Sharma	0	0
(United States) Patrick McEnroe	4	6	6
(United Kingdom) Chris Clarke	6	3	3
(United Kingdom) Mark Frankel	1	1
(South Africa) Gary Muller	6	6
(United Kingdom) Martin Guntrip	2	1
27	(Australia) Chris Johnstone	6	6

Second round
11	(South Africa) Eddie Edwards	6	6	6
(United States) Patrick McEnroe	4	7	1
(South Africa) Gary Muller	4	3
27	(Australia) Chris Johnstone	6	6

Qualifying competition
11	(South Africa) Eddie Edwards	7	6	7
27	(Australia) Chris Johnstone	6	3	5

=== Twelfth qualifier ===
First round
12	(United States) Mike De Palmer	6	6
(South Africa) Frank Punčec	4	3
(South Africa) Deon Joubert	6	6	7
(Japan) Shigeyuki Nishio	7	4	5
(United States) Bud Cox	6	6
(West Germany) Peter Moraing	3	4
(Israel) David Schneider	1	4
23	(Australia) Broderick Dyke	6	6

Second round
12	(United States) Mike De Palmer	6	6
(South Africa) Deon Joubert	0	1
(United States) Bud Cox	7	3	6
23	(Australia) Broderick Dyke	5	6	4

Qualifying competition
12	(United States) Mike De Palmer	6	4	6	6	3
(United States) Bud Cox	7	6	3	2	6

=== Thirteenth qualifier ===
First round
13	(United States) David Dowlen	6	6
(United Kingdom) Alan Douglas	3	1
(South Africa) Dean Johnson	6	4	6
(Australia) Charlie Fancutt	4	6	2
(United States) John Fernandez	0	0
(India) Anand Amritraj	6	6
(Denmark) Michael Mortensen	3	5
30	(United States) Paul Annacone	6	7

Second round
13	(United States) David Dowlen	7	7
(South Africa) Dean Johnson	6	6
(India) Anand Amritraj	2	3
30	(United States) Paul Annacone	6	6

Qualifying competition
13	(United States) David Dowlen	6	6	6	1
30	(United States) Paul Annacone	4	7	7	6

=== Fourteenth qualifier ===
First round
14	(United States) Butch Walts	6	1	6
(Japan) Hitoshi Shirato	4	6	3
(Israel) Amos Mansdorf	3	0
(South Africa) Christo van Rensburg	6	6
(Australia) Roger Grant	7	5	5
(Italy) Gianluca Pozzi	6	7	7
(United Kingdom) Chris Bradnam	7	6
29	(United States) Jonathan Canter	5	2

Second round
14	(United States) Butch Walts	2	6
(South Africa) Christo van Rensburg	6	7
(Italy) Gianluca Pozzi	2	7	12
(United Kingdom) Chris Bradnam	6	6	14

Qualifying competition
(South Africa) Christo van Rensburg	6	6	6
(United Kingdom) Chris Bradnam	4	4	2

=== Fifteenth qualifier ===
First round
15	(United States) Drew Gitlin	6	6
(United Kingdom) Stuart King	0	3
(United States) Jeff Turpin	6	6
(United States) Charlie Pasarell	2	4
(United States) Randy Druz	6	6	14
(United States) Jacques Manset	7	4	12
(Australia) Ron Woodbridge	2	2
22	(United States) John Mattke	6	6

Second round
15	(United States) Drew Gitlin	5	1
(United States) Jeff Turpin	7	6
(United States) Randy Druz	6	7
22	(United States) John Mattke	3	6

Qualifying competition
(United States) Jeff Turpin	6	3	7	7
(United States) Randy Druz	4	6	5	6

=== Sixteenth qualifier ===
First round
16	(West Germany) Eric Jelen	3	4
(Australia) Mark Kratzmann	6	6
(United Kingdom) Jason Goodall	4	6	6
(United Kingdom) Jeremy Dier	6	4	3
(Australia) Peter Johnston	6	6
(United States) Gary Donnelly	7	7
(United Kingdom) Edward Hood	1	2
21	(United States) Randy Nixon	6	6

Second round
(Australia) Mark Kratzmann	6	6
(United Kingdom) Jason Goodall	4	2
(United States) Gary Donnelly	6	6	6
21	(United States) Randy Nixon	2	7	4

Qualifying competition
(Australia) Mark Kratzmann	6	6	6
(United States) Gary Donnelly	3	4	4
