= 1984 Wimbledon Championships – Boys' singles =

Boys' singles
- 1984 Wimbledon Championships

Final
- Champion: (Australia) Mark Kratzmann
- Runner-up: (South Africa) Stefan Kruger
- Score: 6–4, 4–6, 6–3

Events
Singles	men	women		boys	girls
Doubles	men	women	mixed	boys	girls
WC Singles	men	women	quad
WC Doubles	men	women	quad
Legends	men	women	seniors
- Wimbledon Championships

Mark Kratzmann defeated Stefan Kruger in the final, 6–4, 4–6, 6–3 to win the boys' singles tennis title at the 1984 Wimbledon Championships.

== Seeds ==
1. (United Kingdom) Stephen Botfield (first round)
2. (Australia) Mark Kratzmann (champion)
3. (Sweden) Jonas Svensson (semifinals)
4. (United States) Brad Pearce (semifinals)
5. (United States) Dan Nahirny (second round)
6. (United States) Patrick McEnroe (third round)
7. (Austria) Thomas Muster (second round)
8. (South Africa) Marius Masencamp (first round)
9. (United States) Luke Jensen (quarterfinals)
10. (Soviet Union) Andrei Chesnokov (third round)
11. (Philippines) Felix Barrientos (quarterfinals)
12. (France) Éric Winogradsky (quarterfinals)
13. (Australia) Brett Custer (third round)
14. (Australia) David Macpherson (first round)
15. (United States) Robbie Weiss (first round)
16. (Austria) Alex Antonitsch (second round)

Click on the seed number of a player to go to their draw section.

== Draw ==
Key

- Q = Qualifier
- WC = Wild card
- LL = Lucky loser
- Alt = Alternate
- ITF = ITF entry
- PR = Protected ranking
- SR = Special ranking
- SE = Special exempt
- JE = Junior exempt
- JR = Junior Accelerator Programme entrant
- CO = College Accelerator Programme entrant
- NG = Next Gen Accelerator Program entrant
- w/o = Walkover
- r = Retired
- d = Defaulted

=== Finals ===
Quarterfinals
(South Africa) Stefan Kruger	7	6
9	(United States) Luke Jensen	6	4
4	(United States) Brad Pearce	6	6
12	(France) Éric Winogradsky	4	1
(France) François Errard	2	5
3	(Sweden) Jonas Svensson	6	7
11	(Philippines) Felix Barrientos	3	2
2	(Australia) Mark Kratzmann	6	6

Semifinals
(South Africa) Stefan Kruger	7	7
4	(United States) Brad Pearce	5	6
3	(Sweden) Jonas Svensson	4	4
2	(Australia) Mark Kratzmann	6	6

Final
(South Africa) Stefan Kruger	4	6	3
2	(Australia) Mark Kratzmann	6	4	6

=== Top half ===
==== Section 1 ====
First round
1	(United Kingdom) Stephen Botfield	1	2
(South Africa) Stefan Kruger	6	6
(Pakistan) Haseeb Aslam	4	5
(Netherlands) Rob Simon	6	7
(South Korea) Choi Hee-joong	3	2
(Mexico) Leonardo Lavalle	6	6
(Spain) Fernando García Lleó	7	6
14	(Australia) David Macpherson	6	1
9	(United States) Luke Jensen	6	6
(Zimbabwe) Mark Gurr	3	0
(Israel) Gilad Bloom	6	6
(Kenya) Eno Polo	1	0
(India) Hari Aiyar	4	1
(United Kingdom) Paul Coyle	6	6
(Chile) Manuel Rodríguez	2	6	6
8	(South Africa) Marius Masencamp	6	4	4

Second round
(South Africa) S Kruger	6	7
(Netherlands) R Simon	2	6
(Mexico) L Lavalle	6	0	2
(Spain) F García Lleó	4	6	6
9	(United States) L Jensen	6	6
(Israel) G Bloom	2	3
(United Kingdom) P Coyle	3	2
(Chile) M Rodríguez	6	6

Third round
(South Africa) S Kruger	6	2	6
(Spain) F García Lleó	3	6	4
9	(United States) L Jensen	7	4	6
(Chile) M Rodríguez	6	6	4

Quarterfinals
(South Africa) S Kruger	7	6
9	(United States) L Jensen	6	4

==== Section 2 ====
First round
4	(United States) Brad Pearce	6	6
(Belgium) Denis Langaskens	3	3
(Monaco) Gilles Ganancia	3	7	6
(Czechoslovakia) Cyril Suk	6	6	2
(United Kingdom) Richard Whichello	6	6
(Hong Kong) Colin Grant	1	3
(South Korea) Choi Seong-hoon	2	4
16	(Austria) Alex Antonitsch	6	6
12	(France) Éric Winogradsky	6	6
(Italy) Francesco Ricci	2	4
(Romania) Mihnea-Ion Năstase	6	6
(United Kingdom) Austen Brice	2	3
(Venezuela) A Rezic	4	7	0
(Japan) Shigeru Ohta	6	5	6
(Soviet Union) Andrei Olhovskiy	3	6	1
6	(United States) Patrick McEnroe	6	3	6

Second round
4	(United States) B Pearce	6	6
(Monaco) G Ganancia	0	3
(United Kingdom) R Whichello	6	5	6
16	(Austria) A Antonitsch	1	7	2
12	(France) É Winogradsky	6	6
(Romania) M-I Năstase	3	2
(Japan) S Ohta	3	5
6	(United States) P McEnroe	6	7

Third round
4	(United States) B Pearce	6	7	6
(United Kingdom) R Whichello	7	6	3
12	(France) É Winogradsky	7	6
6	(United States) P McEnroe	6	2

Quarterfinals
4	(United States) B Pearce	6	6
12	(France) É Winogradsky	4	1

=== Bottom half ===
==== Section 3 ====
First round
5	(United States) Dan Nahirny	4	7	6
(United Kingdom) Benjamin Knapp	6	5	3
(United States) Ricky Brown	6	2
(United Kingdom) Mike Walker	7	6
(New Zealand) Mark Long	6	2	7
(Italy) Nevio Devide	3	6	5
(France) François Errard	6	6
15	(United States) Robbie Weiss	3	4
10	(Soviet Union) Andrei Chesnokov	6	6
(Venezuela) Valerio Boccitto	3	3
(Philippines) Manny Tolentino	5	1
(Spain) SC Castello	7	6
(Switzerland) Stefan Bienz	6	6
(Brazil) José Daher	3	1
(Canada) Andrew Sznajder	2	2
3	(Sweden) Jonas Svensson	6	6

Second round
5	(United States) D Nahirny	5	3
(United Kingdom) M Walker	7	6
(New Zealand) M Long	1	1
(France) F Errard	6	6
10	(Soviet Union) A Chesnokov	6	7
(Spain) SC Castello	1	6
(Switzerland) S Bienz	6	1
3	(Sweden) J Svensson	7	6

Third round
(United Kingdom) M Walker	2	4
(France) F Errard	6	6
(Soviet Union) A Chesnokov	6	1	2
3	(Sweden) J Svensson	2	6	6

Quarterfinals
(France) F Errard	2	5
3	(Sweden) J Svensson	6	7

==== Section 4 ====
First round
7	(Austria) Thomas Muster	7	6
(United Kingdom) Jason Goodall	6	3
(Thailand) Thanakorn Srichaphan	1	1
(Sweden) Christer Allgårdh	6	6
(Poland) Wojciech Kowalski	4	6	3
(United Kingdom) Sean Cole	6	3	6
(Philippines) Antonio del Rosario	3	7	1
11	(Philippines) Felix Barrientos	6	5	6
13	(Australia) Brett Custer	6	6
(West Germany) Carl-Uwe Steeb	4	1
(Republic of Ireland) Michael Nugent	1	3
(South Africa) Dean Johnson	6	6
(West Germany) Patrik Kühnen	3	7	6
(Malaysia) Adam Malik	6	6	4
(Denmark) Michael Tauson	3	6	3
2	(Australia) Mark Kratzmann	6	3	6

Second round
7	(Austria) T Muster	7	1	6
(Sweden) C Allgårdh	5	6	8
(United Kingdom) S Cole	3	0
11	(Philippines) F Barrientos	6	6
13	(Australia) B Custer	6	7
(South Africa) D Johnson	4	6
(West Germany) P Kühnen	4	1
2	(Australia) M Kratzmann	6	6

Third round
(Sweden) C Allgårdh	4	6	3
11	(Philippines) F Barrientos	6	3	6
13	(Australia) B Custer	3	3
2	(Australia) M Kratzmann	6	6

Quarterfinals
11	(Philippines) F Barrientos	3	2
2	(Australia) M Kratzmann	6	6
