= 1984 Wimbledon Championships – Boys' doubles =

Boys' doubles
- 1984 Wimbledon Championships

Final
- Champions: (United States) Ricky Brown (United States) Robbie Weiss
- Runners-up: (Australia) Mark Kratzmann (Sweden) Jonas Svensson
- Score: 1–6, 6–4, 11–9

Events
Singles	men	women		boys	girls
Doubles	men	women	mixed	boys	girls
WC Singles	men	women	quad
WC Doubles	men	women	quad
Legends	men	women	seniors
← 1983 ·	Wimbledon Championships	· 1985 →

Mark Kratzmann and Simon Youl were the defending champions but Youl did not compete.

Ricky Brown and Robbie Weiss defeated Kratzmann and Jonas Svensson in the final, 1–6, 6–4, 11–9 to win the boys' doubles tennis title at the 1984 Wimbledon Championships.

== Seeds ==
1. (Australia) Mark Kratzmann / (Sweden) Jonas Svensson (final)
2. (United States) Luke Jensen / (United States) Patrick McEnroe (quarterfinals)
3. (France) François Errard / (France) Éric Winogradsky (first round)
4. (United States) Dan Nahirny / (United States) Brad Pearce (semifinals)

== Draw ==
=== Key ===
- Q = Qualifier
- WC = Wild card
- LL = Lucky loser
- Alt = Alternate
- SE = Special exempt
- PR = Protected ranking
- ITF = ITF entry
- JE = Junior exempt
- w/o = Walkover
- r = Retired
- d = Defaulted
- SR = Special ranking

=== Draw ===
First round
1	(Australia) Mark Kratzmann (Sweden) Jonas Svensson	6	6
(United Kingdom) Benjamin Knapp (United Kingdom) Richard Whichello	1	4
(Philippines) Felix Barrientos (Philippines) Antonio del Rosario	6	0	5
(Venezuela) Valerio Boccitto (Czechoslovakia) Cyril Suk	4	6	7
4	(United States) Dan Nahirny (United States) Brad Pearce	6	7
(South Africa) Dean Johnson (South Africa) Marius Masencamp	2	6
(Italy) Nevio Devide (Italy) Francesco Ricci	6	6
(Poland) Wojciech Kowalski (Belgium) Denis Langaskens	3	4
(United Kingdom) Jason Goodall (United Kingdom) Mike Walker	6	5	4
(Hong Kong) Colin Grant (South Africa) Stefan Kruger	4	7	6
(United States) Ricky Brown (United States) Robbie Weiss	6	7
3	(France) François Errard (France) Éric Winogradsky	4	6
(West Germany) Patrik Kühnen (West Germany) Carl-Uwe Steeb	6	6	7
(Switzerland) Stefan Bienz (Canada) Andrew Sznajder	7	3	5
(Israel) Gilad Bloom (Romania) Mihnea-Ion Năstase	6	3	2
2	(United States) Luke Jensen (United States) Patrick McEnroe	4	6	6

Quarterfinals
1	(Australia) Mark Kratzmann (Sweden) Jonas Svensson	6	6
(Venezuela) Valerio Boccitto (Czechoslovakia) Cyril Suk	4	3
4	(United States) Dan Nahirny (United States) Brad Pearce	6	6
(Italy) Nevio Devide (Italy) Francesco Ricci	2	2
(Hong Kong) Colin Grant (South Africa) Stefan Kruger	4	4
(United States) Ricky Brown (United States) Robbie Weiss	6	6
(West Germany) Patrik Kühnen (West Germany) Carl-Uwe Steeb	6	6
2	(United States) Luke Jensen (United States) Patrick McEnroe	3	4

Semifinals
1	(Australia) Mark Kratzmann (Sweden) Jonas Svensson	4	7	6
4	(United States) Dan Nahirny (United States) Brad Pearce	6	5	4
(United States) Ricky Brown (United States) Robbie Weiss	3	6	6
(West Germany) Patrik Kühnen (West Germany) Carl-Uwe Steeb	6	3	4

Final
1	(Australia) Mark Kratzmann (Sweden) Jonas Svensson	6	4	9
(United States) Ricky Brown (United States) Robbie Weiss	1	6	11
