= Randy Druz =

American tennis player

- Full name: Randall Druz
- Country (sports): United States
- Born: February 26, 1958 (age 68) Elmhurst, Illinois, U.S.
- Plays: Right-handed

Singles
- Career record: 0–3
- Highest ranking: No. 239 (Jan 2, 1984)

Grand Slam singles results
- Wimbledon: Q3 (1984)
- US Open: 1R (1983)

Doubles
- Career record: 1–7
- Highest ranking: No. 285 (Jan 2, 1984)

Grand Slam doubles results
- Wimbledon: 1R (1983)

Randall Druz (born February 26, 1958) is an American former professional tennis player.

Born in Illinois, Druz won state doubles championships while at Hinsdale Central High School. He played collegiate tennis for Indiana University from 1977 to 1980, earning All-Big Ten honors as a senior.

Druz competed on the professional tour in the 1980s, with main draw appearances at Wimbledon and the US Open.
