= 1984 Wimbledon Championships – Girls' singles =

Girls' singles
- 1984 Wimbledon Championships

Final
- Champion: (United Kingdom) Annabel Croft
- Runner-up: (South Africa) Elna Reinach
- Score: 3–6, 6–3, 6–2

Events
Singles	men	women		boys	girls
Doubles	men	women	mixed	boys	girls
WC Singles	men	women	quad
WC Doubles	men	women	quad
Legends	men	women	seniors
← 1983 ·	Wimbledon Championships	· 1985 →

Annabel Croft defeated Elna Reinach in the final, 3–6, 6–3, 6–2 to win the girls' singles tennis title at the 1984 Wimbledon Championships.

== Seeds ==
1. (United States) Melissa Brown (third round)
2. (United States) Michelle Torres (third round)
3. (United Kingdom) Annabel Croft (champion)
4. (South Africa) Rene Mentz (quarterfinals)
5. (Soviet Union) Larisa Savchenko (second round)
6. (Brazil) Niege Dias (quarterfinals)
7. (Argentina) Mercedes Paz (third round)
8. (Brazil) Silvana Campos (second round)

Click on the seed number of a player to go to their draw section.

== Draw ==
=== Key ===
- Q = Qualifier
- WC = Wild card
- LL = Lucky loser
- Alt = Alternate
- SE = Special exempt
- PR = Protected ranking
- ITF = ITF entry
- JE = Junior exempt
- w/o = Walkover
- r = Retired
- d = Defaulted
- SR = Special ranking

=== Finals ===
Quarterfinals
(United States) Stephanie Rehe	4	1
(Australia) Janine Thompson	6	6
3	(United Kingdom) Annabel Croft	6	6
(United States) Shawn Foltz	1	0
(South Africa) Elna Reinach	6	0	7
4	(South Africa) Rene Mentz	1	6	5
6	(Brazil) Niege Dias	4	3
(Switzerland) Eva Krapl	6	6

Semifinals
(Australia) Janine Thompson	6	5	1
3	(United Kingdom) Annabel Croft	4	7	6
(South Africa) Elna Reinach	6	4	6
(Switzerland) Eva Krapl	2	6	3

Final
3	(United Kingdom) Annabel Croft	3	6	6
(South Africa) Elna Reinach	6	3	2

=== Top half ===
==== Section 1 ====
First round
(Chile) Carolina Espinoza	2	4
(United Kingdom) Suzi Mair	6	6
(United States) Stephanie Rehe	6	6
(Republic of Ireland) Siobhán Nicholson	0	1
(Belgium) Kathleen Schuurmans	6	7
(France) Isabelle Demongeot	4	5
(Australia) Janine Thompson	6	7
(Brazil) Luciana Corsato	1	6

Second round
1	(United States) Melissa Brown	6	6
(Mexico) Claudia Hernández	4	1
(United Kingdom) S Mair	0	4
(United States) S Rehe	6	6
(Belgium) K Schuurmans	6	6
(Japan) Ei Iida	4	4
(Australia) J Thompson	6	7
8	(Brazil) Silvana Campos	4	5

Third round
1	(United States) M Brown	3	1
(United States) S Rehe	6	6
(Belgium) K Schuurmans	1	6	3
(Australia) J Thompson	6	3	6

Quarterfinals
(United States) S Rehe	4	1
(Australia) J Thompson	6	6

==== Section 2 ====
First round
(West Germany) Isabel Cueto	3	2
(Sweden) Monica Lundqvist	6	6
(Bulgaria) Katerina Maleeva	6	6
(Hong Kong) Paulette Moreno	4	1
(United States) Shawn Foltz	6	6
(South Korea) Lee Jeong-myung	2	0
(United States) Marianne Werdel	6	6
(Canada) Helen Kelesi	0	1

Second round
3	(United Kingdom) Annabel Croft	6	6
(Sweden) M Lundqvist	1	0
(United Kingdom) Jo Louis	7	2	6
(Bulgaria) K Maleeva	5	6	1
(United States) S Foltz	6	6
(Czechoslovakia) Jana Novotná	1	3
(United States) M Werdel	3	4
7	(Argentina) Mercedes Paz	6	6

Third round
3	(United Kingdom) A Croft	6	6
(United Kingdom) J Louis	3	0
(United States) S Foltz	6	7
(Argentina) M Paz	2	6

Quarterfinals
3	(United Kingdom) A Croft	6	6
(United States) S Foltz	1	0

=== Bottom half ===
==== Section 3 ====
First round
(Japan) Akiko Kijimuta	1	3
(West Germany) Andrea Betzner	6	6
(United States) Caroline Kuhlman	6	6	3
(South Africa) Elna Reinach	3	7	6
(Netherlands) Digna Ketelaar	6	6
(United Kingdom) Amanda Grunfeld	3	0
(New Zealand) Julie Richardson	4	3
(Japan) Mitsuko Yokota	6	6

Second round
5	(Soviet Union) Larisa Savchenko	6	6
(West Germany) A Betzner	7	7
(United Kingdom) Alison Grant	2	1
(South Africa) E Reinach	6	6
(Netherlands) D Ketelaar	6	6
(Italy) Laura Garrone	4	2
(Japan) M Yokota	4	2
4	(South Africa) Rene Mentz	6	6

Third round
(West Germany) A Betzner	5	4
(South Africa) E Reinach	7	6
(Netherlands) D Ketelaar	0	2
4	(South Africa) R Mentz	6	6

Quarterfinals
(South Africa) E Reinach	6	0	7
4	(South Africa) R Mentz	1	6	5

==== Section 4 ====
First round
(United States) Debbie Spence	6	6
(Chile) Natalia Rodríguez	3	2
(Soviet Union) Viktoria Milvidskaia	6	6
(United Kingdom) Belinda Borneo	4	4
(Netherlands) Simone Schilder	4	4
(Switzerland) Eva Krapl	6	6
(France) Nathalie Tauziat	6	6
(Sweden) Carin Anderholm	1	4

Second round
6	(Brazil) Niege Dias
(United States) D Spence	w/o
(Soviet Union) V Milvidskaia	6	3	4
(South Africa) Monica Reinach	3	6	6
(Switzerland) E Krapl	6	6
(Philippines) Jennifer Saberon	3	2
(France) N Tauziat	4	6
2	(United States) Michelle Torres	6	7

Third round
6	(Brazil) N Dias	6	6
(South Africa) M Reinach	2	2
(Switzerland) E Krapl	5	6	10
2	(United States) M Torres	7	4	8

Quarterfinals
6	(Brazil) N Dias	4	3
(Switzerland) E Krapl	6	6
