= Manuel Rodríguez (tennis) =

Chilean tennis player

- Full name: Manuel Rodríguez Boulle
- Country (sports): Chile

Singles
- Career record: 0–2
- Highest ranking: No. 454 (16 Jul 1984)

Grand Slam singles results
- Wimbledon: Q1 (1984, 1987)

Doubles
- Career record: 2–7
- Highest ranking: No. 296 (18 Jul 1988)

Grand Slam doubles results
- Wimbledon: Q1 (1984)

Manuel Rodríguez Boulle is a Chilean former professional tennis player.

Active in the 1980s, Rodríguez is the son of tennis players. His father Patricio was a Davis Cup player and famous coach, while his mother Michelle is a French native who after marriage represented Chile in the Federation Cup. Two siblings, twin sisters Nathalie and Pauline, followed their mother's path and competed in the Federation Cup.

Rodríguez, more successful in junior tennis, made his Grand Prix debut at the 1983 Volvo International in North Conway, New Hampshire. He reached his career high singles ranking of 454 in 1984 and finished up on tour in 1989.
