= 1984 Wimbledon Championships – Girls' doubles =

Girls' doubles
- 1984 Wimbledon Championships

Final
- Champions: (United States) Caroline Kuhlman (United States) Stephanie Rehe
- Runners-up: (Soviet Union) Viktoria Milvidskaia (Soviet Union) Larisa Savchenko
- Score: 6–3, 5–7, 6–4

Events
Singles	men	women		boys	girls
Doubles	men	women	mixed	boys	girls
WC Singles	men	women	quad
WC Doubles	men	women	quad
Legends	men	women	seniors
← 1983 ·	Wimbledon Championships	· 1985 →

Caroline Kuhlman and Stephanie Rehe defeated Viktoria Milvidskaia and Larisa Savchenko in the final, 6–3, 5–7, 6–4 to win the girls' doubles tennis title at the 1984 Wimbledon Championships.

== Seeds ==
1. (Soviet Union) Viktoria Milvidskaia / (Soviet Union) Larisa Savchenko (final)
2. (Netherlands) Digna Ketelaar / (Netherlands) Simone Schilder (quarterfinals)
3. (Brazil) Niege Dias / (Argentina) Mercedes Paz (first round)
4. (South Africa) Rene Mentz / (Belgium) Kathleen Schuurmans (first round)

== Draw ==
=== Key ===
- Q = Qualifier
- WC = Wild card
- LL = Lucky loser
- Alt = Alternate
- SE = Special exempt
- PR = Protected ranking
- ITF = ITF entry
- JE = Junior exempt
- w/o = Walkover
- r = Retired
- d = Defaulted
- SR = Special ranking

=== Draw ===
First round
1	(Soviet Union) Viktoria Milvidskaia (Soviet Union) Larisa Savchenko	6	6
(United States) Debbie Spence (United States) Marianne Werdel	3	0
(Canada) Helen Kelesi (Czechoslovakia) Jana Novotná	7	2	7
(United Kingdom) Alison Grant (United Kingdom) Suzi Mair	6	6	5
3	(Brazil) Niege Dias (Argentina) Mercedes Paz	1	2
(South Africa) Elna Reinach (South Africa) Monica Reinach	6	6
(West Germany) Andrea Betzner (West Germany) Isabel Cueto	6	7
(United Kingdom) Belinda Borneo (United Kingdom) Jo Louis	3	6
(Italy) Laura Garrone (Bulgaria) Katerina Maleeva	w/o
(Switzerland) Eva Krapl (Japan) Mitsuko Yokota
(United States) Caroline Kuhlman (United States) Stephanie Rehe	7	6
4	(South Africa) Rene Mentz (Belgium) Kathleen Schuurmans	5	4
(Sweden) Carin Anderholm (Sweden) Monica Lundqvist	6	3	3
(Japan) Ei Iida (Japan) Akiko Kijimuta	2	6	6
(Hong Kong) Paulette Moreno (Philippines) Jennifer Saberon	0	6
2	(Netherlands) Digna Ketelaar (Netherlands) Simone Schilder	6	7

Quarterfinals
1	(Soviet Union) Viktoria Milvidskaia (Soviet Union) Larisa Savchenko	6	6
(Canada) Helen Kelesi (Czechoslovakia) Jana Novotná	3	4
(South Africa) Elna Reinach (South Africa) Monica Reinach	6	7
(West Germany) Andrea Betzner (West Germany) Isabel Cueto	2	6
(Switzerland) Eva Krapl (Japan) Mitsuko Yokota	w/o
(United States) Caroline Kuhlman (United States) Stephanie Rehe
(Japan) Ei Iida (Japan) Akiko Kijimuta	6	4	6
2	(Netherlands) Digna Ketelaar (Netherlands) Simone Schilder	4	6	1

Semifinals
1	(Soviet Union) Viktoria Milvidskaia (Soviet Union) Larisa Savchenko	6	7
(South Africa) Elna Reinach (South Africa) Monica Reinach	3	6
(United States) Caroline Kuhlman (United States) Stephanie Rehe	6	6
(Japan) Ei Iida (Japan) Akiko Kijimuta	0	3

Final
1	(Soviet Union) Viktoria Milvidskaia (Soviet Union) Larisa Savchenko	3	7	4
(United States) Caroline Kuhlman (United States) Stephanie Rehe	6	5	6
