= Natalia Leipus =

Australian tennis player

- Country (sports): Australia
- Born: 10 April 1962 (age 62)

Grand Slam mixed doubles results
- Wimbledon: 3R (1984)

Natalia Leipus (born 10 April 1962) is an Australia former professional tennis player.

Leipus, a South Australian, made the round of 16 in the mixed doubles at the 1984 Wimbledon Championships. She and partner Peter Doohan were competing in the draw as lucky losers from qualifying and it was the only grand slam main draw appearance of her career.

Her brother Andrew Leipus is a physiotherapist, most known for his time working for the India national cricket team.

== ITF finals ==
=== Doubles: 2 (1–1) ===
Result	Date	Tournament	Surface	Partner	Opponents	Score
Loss	22 July 1984	Fayetteville, United States	Hard	(Australia) Rebecca Bryant	(United States) Cynthia MacGregor (United States) Linda Gates	1–6, 6–7
Win	4 November 1988	Melbourne, Australia	Hard	(Australia) Bernadette Randall	(Bulgaria) Elena Pampoulova (Australia) Kristin Godridge	6–4, 6–7^{(5)}, 6–2
