= Marius Masencamp =

South African tennis player

- Country (sports): South Africa
- Born: 6 September 1966 (age 58)
- Prize money: $15,475

Singles
- Career record: 0–1
- Highest ranking: No. 275 (23 December 1985)

Grand Slam singles results
- Wimbledon: Q2 (1984)

Doubles
- Highest ranking: No. 365 (28 July 1986)

Grand Slam doubles results
- Wimbledon: Q1 (1984, 1985)

Marius Masencamp (born 6 September 1966) is a South African former professional tennis player.

== Biography ==
Masencamp played on the professional tour during the 1980s and reached a career best singles ranking of 275 in the world.

In 1985 he won the first edition of the OTB Open in Schenectady, which was then part of the Challenger Tour but later became a Grand Prix tournament. He won the title as a qualifier and defeated former French Open finalist Harold Solomon in the decider.

His only Grand Prix main draw appearance came at the 1988 South African Open, where he lost in the first round to world number 24 Andrés Gómez from Ecuador.

Masencamp had a stint playing college tennis in the United States for Auburn University. He was named in the All-SEC team in 1985 and participated in the NCAA championships.

As of 2018 he is a tennis coach for St Stithians College in Johannesburg.

== Challenger titles ==
=== Singles: (1) ===
| Year | Tournament | Surface | Opponent | Score |
|---|---|---|---|---|
| 1985 | Schenectady, United States | Hard | (United States) Harold Solomon | 6–0, 3–6, 6–3 |
