= 1984 Wimbledon Championships – Mixed doubles =

Mixed doubles
- 1984 Wimbledon Championships

Final
- Champions: (United Kingdom) John Lloyd (Australia) Wendy Turnbull
- Runners-up: (United States) Steve Denton (United States) Kathy Jordan
- Score: 6–3, 6–3

Details
- Draw: 64 (3 Q )
- Seeds: 8

Events
Singles	men	women		boys	girls
Doubles	men	women	mixed	boys	girls
WC Singles	men	women	quad
WC Doubles	men	women	quad
Legends	men	women	seniors
← 1983 ·	Wimbledon Championships	· 1985 →

John Lloyd and Wendy Turnbull successfully defended their title, defeating Steve Denton and Kathy Jordan in the final, 6–3, 6–3 to win the mixed doubles tennis title at the 1984 Wimbledon Championships.

== Seeds ==
1. (United Kingdom) John Lloyd / (Australia) Wendy Turnbull (champions)
2. (United States) Steve Denton / (United States) Kathy Jordan (final)
3. (United States) Dick Stockton / (United States) Anne Smith (third round)
4. (United States) Mike Estep / (United States) Martina Navratilova (quarterfinals)
5. (South Africa) Kevin Curren / (Hungary) Andrea Temesvári (quarterfinals)
6. (India) Vijay Amritraj / (United States) Billie Jean King (withdrew)
7. (United States) Sherwood Stewart / (Australia) Elizabeth Sayers (semifinals)
8. (United States) Marty Riessen / (United Kingdom) Anne Hobbs (quarterfinals)

Click on the seed number of a player to go to their draw section.

== Draw ==
=== Key ===
- Q = Qualifier
- WC = Wild card
- LL = Lucky loser
- Alt = Alternate
- SE = Special exempt
- PR = Protected ranking
- ITF = ITF entry
- JE = Junior exempt
- w/o = Walkover
- r = Retired
- d = Defaulted
- SR = Special ranking

=== Finals ===
Quarterfinals
1	(United Kingdom) John Lloyd (Australia) Wendy Turnbull	6	6
(Australia) Laurie Warder (Australia) Anne Minter	3	2
4	(United States) Mike Estep (United States) Martina Navratilova	1	4
7	(United States) Sherwood Stewart (Australia) Elizabeth Sayers	6	6
8	(United States) Marty Riessen (United Kingdom) Anne Hobbs	6	2	8
(United States) Tony Giammalva (United States) Sharon Walsh	3	6	10
5	(South Africa) Kevin Curren (Hungary) Andrea Temesvári	4	5
2	(United States) Steve Denton (United States) Kathy Jordan	6	7

Semifinals
1	(United Kingdom) John Lloyd (Australia) Wendy Turnbull	6	5	6
7	(United States) Sherwood Stewart (Australia) Elizabeth Sayers	1	7	2
(United States) Tony Giammalva (United States) Sharon Walsh	5	5
2	(United States) Steve Denton (United States) Kathy Jordan	7	7

Final
1	(United Kingdom) John Lloyd (Australia) Wendy Turnbull	6	6
2	(United States) Steve Denton (United States) Kathy Jordan	3	3

=== Top half ===
==== Section 1 ====
First round
1	(United Kingdom) J Lloyd (Australia) W Turnbull	6	6
(Australia) J Newcombe (United States) A Leand	4	4
(Australia) M Fancutt (United States) C Reynolds	w/o
(United States) B Testerman (United States) R Casals
LL	(Australia) G Whitecross (Canada) J Hetherington	7	6
(United States) K Walts (United States) S Mascarin	5	2
(India) A Amritraj (United States) S Acker	6	3	6
Q	(Australia) B Dyke (Switzerland) H Strachoňová	3	6	3
(Australia) O Davidson (South Africa) I Kloss	6	3	5
(United States) M De Palmer (Socialist Federal Republic of Yugoslavia) S Goleš	4	6	7
LL	(New Zealand) R Simpson (New Zealand) B Perry	6	2	2
(Australia) L Warder (Australia) A Minter	4	6	6
(United Kingdom) M Guntrip (United States) H Ludloff	6	6	4
(United States) M Purcell (United States) P Smith	4	7	6
(Australia) D Graham (United States) E Herr	4	1
LL	(Australia) R Grant (Australia) A Gulley	6	6

Second round
1	(United Kingdom) J Lloyd (Australia) W Turnbull	6	6
(Australia) M Fancutt (United States) C Reynolds	3	4
LL	(Australia) G Whitecross (Canada) J Hetherington	6	6	2
(India) A Amritraj (United States) S Acker	4	7	6
(United States) M De Palmer (Socialist Federal Republic of Yugoslavia) S Goleš	4	6
(Australia) L Warder (Australia) A Minter	6	7
(United States) M Purcell (United States) P Smith	6	6
LL	(Australia) R Grant (Australia) A Gulley	3	1

Third round
1	(United Kingdom) J Lloyd (Australia) W Turnbull	6	6
(India) A Amritraj (United States) S Acker	2	2
(Australia) L Warder (Australia) A Minter	7	7
(United States) M Purcell (United States) P Smith	5	6

Quarterfinals
1	(United Kingdom) J Lloyd (Australia) W Turnbull	6	6
(Australia) L Warder (Australia) A Minter	3	2

==== Section 2 ====
First round
4	(United States) M Estep (United States) M Navratilova	6	6
(United States) K Flach (United States) F Raschiatore	1	2
(United Kingdom) J Feaver (United Kingdom) V Wade	6	6
(United States) M Davis (United States) M-L Piatek	4	4
(Australia) S Ball (United States) K Shaefer	4	4
(South Africa) B Mitton (United States) P Teeguarden	6	6
(South Africa) B Levine (South Africa) Y Vermaak	1	2
(United States) G Holmes (Canada) C Bassett	6	6
(United Kingdom) C Dowdeswell (Japan) E Inoue	7	6
(United States) R Lutz (United States) L Allen	6	4
(United Kingdom) D Lloyd (United Kingdom) S Barker	6	7
(United Kingdom) R Lewis (United States) M Torres	3	6
(Australia) C Johnstone (Australia) P Whytcross	2	5
(Brazil) C Motta (Brazil) C Monteiro	6	7
(United States) M Doyle (United States) K Sands
7	(United States) S Stewart (Australia) E Sayers	w/o

Second round
4	(United States) M Estep (United States) M Navratilova	6	6
(United Kingdom) J Feaver (United Kingdom) V Wade	3	3
(South Africa) B Mitton (United States) P Teeguarden	4	0^{r}
(United States) G Holmes (Canada) C Bassett	6	1
(United Kingdom) C Dowdeswell (Japan) E Inoue	5	6	6
(United Kingdom) D Lloyd (United Kingdom) S Barker	7	1	3
(Brazil) C Motta (Brazil) C Monteiro	3	6	0
7	(United States) S Stewart (Australia) E Sayers	6	3	6

Third round
4	(United States) M Estep (United States) M Navratilova	3	7	6
(United States) G Holmes (Canada) C Bassett	6	5	3
(United Kingdom) C Dowdeswell (Japan) E Inoue	6	4	2
7	(United States) S Stewart (Australia) E Sayers	4	6	6

Quarterfinals
4	(United States) M Estep (United States) M Navratilova	1	4
7	(United States) S Stewart (Australia) E Sayers	6	6

=== Bottom half ===
==== Section 3 ====
First round
8	(United States) M Riessen (United Kingdom) A Hobbs	6	4	6
Q	(Australia) M Kratzmann (Australia) J Byrne	3	6	3
(Australia) C Dibley (Australia) J Dalton	6	6
(United Kingdom) S Bale (United Kingdom) R Einy	7	7
(United States) C Dunk (United States) B Jordan	6	5
(United States) D Gitlin (Netherlands) M Mesker	7	7
LL	(Australia) P Doohan (Australia) N Leipus	6	7
(United Kingdom) J Dier (South Africa) J Mundel	4	5
(Denmark) M Mortensen (Denmark) T Scheuer-Larsen	6	4	4
(United States) A Giammalva (United States) S Walsh	4	6	6
(United States) V Amaya (United Kingdom) A Croft	2	3
(United States) P Rennert (France) C Tanvier	6	6
(United States) R Seguso (United States) J Golder	5	7	6
(South Africa) F McMillan (Netherlands) B Stöve	7	6	3
(United States) S Meister (United States) P Barg
3	(United States) R Stockton (United States) A Smith	w/o

Second round
8	(United States) M Riessen (United Kingdom) A Hobbs	6	6
(United Kingdom) S Bale (United Kingdom) R Einy	3	2
(United States) D Gitlin (Netherlands) M Mesker	4	5
LL	(Australia) P Doohan (Australia) N Leipus	6	7
(United States) A Giammalva (United States) S Walsh	7	7
(United States) P Rennert (France) C Tanvier	5	5
(United States) R Seguso (United States) J Golder	3	2
3	(United States) R Stockton (United States) A Smith	6	6

Third round
8	(United States) M Riessen (United Kingdom) A Hobbs	6	6
LL	(Australia) P Doohan (Australia) N Leipus	3	2
(United States) A Giammalva (United States) S Walsh	6	6
3	(United States) R Stockton (United States) A Smith	2	1

Quarterfinals
8	(United States) M Riessen (United Kingdom) A Hobbs	6	2	8
(United States) A Giammalva (United States) S Walsh	3	6	10

==== Section 4 ====
First round
5	(South Africa) K Curren (Hungary) A Temesvári	6	6
(South Africa) R Moore (South Africa) R Mentz	0	2
(South Africa) C van Rensburg (South Africa) B Mould	6	3	5
(United Kingdom) C Bradnam (United Kingdom) A Brown	2	6	7
(United States) C Strode (South Africa) R Fairbank	7	6	6
Q	(Australia) C Miller (Australia) B Remilton	5	7	3
(Brazil) G Barbosa (Brazil) P Medrado	w/o
(United States) R Harmon (United States) Z Garrison
(United States) T Gullikson (Italy) S Simmonds	5	6	3
(Chile) J Fillol (United States) P Casale	7	4	6
(United States) L Stefanki (United States) A White	6	7
(Australia) J Fitzgerald (United States) E Nagelsen	2	6
(United States) C Cox (United States) W White	6	4	8
(United States) D Ralston (United States) C Benjamin	3	6	6
(United States) L Bourne (United States) A Moulton	2	7	4
2	(United States) S Denton (United States) K Jordan	6	6	6

Second round
5	(South Africa) K Curren (Hungary) A Temesvári	7	6
(United Kingdom) C Bradnam (United Kingdom) A Brown	6	0
(United States) C Strode (South Africa) R Fairbank	7	6
(Brazil) G Barbosa (Brazil) P Medrado	6	4
(Chile) J Fillol (United States) P Casale	7	6
(United States) L Stefanki (United States) A White	5	4
(United States) C Cox (United States) W White	5	2
2	(United States) S Denton (United States) K Jordan	7	6

Third round
5	(South Africa) K Curren (Hungary) A Temesvári	6	7
(United States) C Strode (South Africa) R Fairbank	1	6
(Chile) J Fillol (United States) P Casale	3	7	1
2	(United States) S Denton (United States) K Jordan	6	6	6

Quarterfinals
5	(South Africa) K Curren (Hungary) A Temesvári	4	5
2	(United States) S Denton (United States) K Jordan	6	7
