= 1984 Wimbledon Championships – Women's singles =

Women's singles
- 1984 Wimbledon Championships

Final
- Champion: (United States) Martina Navratilova
- Runner-up: (United States) Chris Evert Lloyd
- Score: 7–6^{(7–5)}, 6–2

Details
- Draw: 128 (8 Q / 8 WC )
- Seeds: 16

Events
Singles	men	women		boys	girls
Doubles	men	women	mixed	boys	girls
WC Singles	men	women	quad
WC Doubles	men	women	quad
Legends	men	women	seniors
← 1983 ·	Wimbledon Championships	· 1985 →

Two-time defending champion Martina Navratilova defeated Chris Evert Lloyd in the final, 7–6^{(7–5)}, 6–2 to win the ladies' singles tennis title at the 1984 Wimbledon Championships. It was her fifth Wimbledon singles title and tenth major singles title overall. For the second consecutive year, Navratilova did not lose a set during the tournament.

This marked the first Wimbledon appearance of future seven-time champion and world No. 1 Steffi Graf; she was defeated in the fourth round by Jo Durie.

== Seeds ==
1. (United States) Martina Navratilova (champion)
2. (United States) Chris Evert Lloyd (final)
3. (Czechoslovakia) Hana Mandlíková (semifinals)
4. (United States) Pam Shriver (quarterfinals)
5. (United States) Zina Garrison (second round)
6. (United States) Kathy Jordan (semifinals)
7. (Bulgaria) Manuela Maleeva (quarterfinals)
8. (United States) Kathy Horvath (second round)
9. (Australia) Wendy Turnbull (fourth round)
10. (United Kingdom) Jo Durie (quarterfinals)
11. (United States) Lisa Bonder (third round)
12. (West Germany) Claudia Kohde-Kilsch (fourth round)
13. (United States) Barbara Potter (fourth round)
14. (Czechoslovakia) Helena Suková (fourth round)
15. (Hungary) Andrea Temesvári (fourth round)
16. (Canada) Carling Bassett (third round)

Click on the seed number of a player to go to their draw section.

== Draw ==
=== Key ===
- Q = Qualifier
- WC = Wild card
- LL = Lucky loser
- Alt = Alternate
- ITF = ITF entry
- PR = Protected ranking
- SR = Special ranking
- SE = Special exempt
- JE = Junior exempt
- JR = Junior Accelerator Programme entrant
- CO = College Accelerator Programme entrant
- NG = Next Gen Accelerator Program entrant
- w/o = Walkover
- r = Retired
- d = Defaulted

=== Finals ===
Quarterfinals
1	(United States) Martina Navratilova	6	6
7	(Bulgaria) Manuela Maleeva	3	2
4	(United States) Pam Shriver	6	3	4
6	(United States) Kathy Jordan	2	6	6
10	(United Kingdom) Jo Durie	1	4
3	(Czechoslovakia) Hana Mandlíková	6	6
Q	(Sweden) Carina Karlsson	2	2
2	(United States) Chris Evert Lloyd	6	6

Semifinals
1	(United States) Martina Navratilova	6	6
6	(United States) Kathy Jordan	3	4
3	(Czechoslovakia) Hana Mandlíková	1	2
2	(United States) Chris Evert Lloyd	6	6

Final
1	(United States) Martina Navratilova	7^{7}	6
2	(United States) Chris Evert Lloyd	6^{5}	2

=== Top half ===
==== Section 1 ====
First round
1	(United States) M Navratilova	6	6
(United States) M Harper	4	0
WC	(United Kingdom) S Mair	4	6
(United States) A Holton	6	7
(Denmark) T Scheuer-Larsen	4	1
(United States) A Moulton	6	6
(Netherlands) M Mesker	6	2
(Czechoslovakia) I Budařová	7	6
(United States) G Rush	4	6	6
(United States) E Herr	6	4	1
(United States) R White	2	3
(Australia) E Sayers	6	6
(United States) B Gerken	6	6
(France) C Vanier	1	2
WC	(United Kingdom) J Louis	6	3	3
11	(United States) L Bonder	2	6	6

Second round
1	(United States) M Navratilova	6	7
(United States) A Holton	2	5
(United States) A Moulton	4	4
(Czechoslovakia) I Budařová	6	6
(United States) G Rush	4	6	2
(Australia) E Sayers	6	3	6
(United States) B Gerken	6	2
11	(United States) L Bonder	7	6

Third round
1	(United States) M Navratilova	6	6
(Czechoslovakia) I Budařová	2	2
(Australia) E Sayers	6	6
11	(United States) L Bonder	4	2

Fourth round
1	(United States) M Navratilova	6	0
(Australia) E Sayers	0	0^{r}

==== Section 2 ====
First round
16	(Canada) C Bassett	6	3	6
(United States) S Walsh	1	6	3
(France) N Herreman	7	3	2
(France) M-C Calleja	5	6	6
(United States) M-L Piatek	6	2	10
(West Germany) S Hanika	2	6	8
(United Kingdom) A Hobbs	6	7
Q	(United States) C Reynolds	2	6
(United States) J Klitch	6	6
(United States) S Collins	3	2
(South Africa) Y Vermaak	7	6
(United States) P Smith	6	1
(Soviet Union) N Reva	6	7
(France) P Paradis	3	6
(South Africa) J Mundel	4	1
7	(Bulgaria) M Maleeva	6	6

Second round
16	(Canada) C Bassett	6	6
(France) M-C Calleja	1	4
(United States) M-L Piatek	4	3
(United Kingdom) A Hobbs	6	6
(United States) J Klitch	3	2
(South Africa) Y Vermaak	6	6
(Soviet Union) N Reva	2	2
7	(Bulgaria) M Maleeva	6	6

Third round
16	(Canada) C Bassett	6	6	4
(United Kingdom) A Hobbs	7	3	6
(South Africa) Y Vermaak	4	4
7	(Bulgaria) M Maleeva	6	6

Fourth round
(United Kingdom) A Hobbs	2	6	3
7	(Bulgaria) M Maleeva	6	3	6

==== Section 3 ====
First round
4	(United States) P Shriver	6	6
(West Germany) E Pfaff	0	4
(Puerto Rico) G Fernández	7	6
(Switzerland) L Drescher	6	4
(United States) W White	7	7
(Socialist Federal Republic of Yugoslavia) M Jaušovec	6	6
(United States) A Leand	3	4
(United States) C Benjamin	6	6
(United States) M Brown	7	1	6
(South Africa) R Uys	5	6	4
Q	(Soviet Union) L Savchenko	1	2
(Czechoslovakia) M Skuherská	6	6
(United States) G Kim	7	1	6
(Japan) E Inoue	6	6	0
(France) C Suire	5	3
13	(United States) B Potter	7	6

Second round
4	(United States) P Shriver	3	6	9
(Puerto Rico) G Fernández	6	3	7
(United States) W White	5	3
(United States) C Benjamin	7	6
(United States) M Brown	4	4
(Czechoslovakia) M Skuherská	6	6
(United States) G Kim	3	0
13	(United States) B Potter	6	6

Third round
4	(United States) P Shriver	6	6
(United States) C Benjamin	0	2
(Czechoslovakia) M Skuherská	1	3
13	(United States) B Potter	6	6

Fourth round
4	(United States) P Shriver	6	6
13	(United States) B Potter	4	3

==== Section 4 ====
First round
9	(Australia) W Turnbull	6	6
WC	(United Kingdom) S Walpole	3	2
(United States) V Nelson	4	1
(United Kingdom) A Brown	6	6
(Sweden) C Jexell	4	4
(United States) F Raschiatore	6	6
Q	(Soviet Union) S Cherneva	1	6	6
(Romania) L Romanov	6	4	4
WC	(United Kingdom) J Salmon	6	6
(Peru) L Arraya	4	3
(South Africa) B Mould	6	6
WC	(United Kingdom) K Brasher	3	4
(Romania) V Ruzici	6	6
(South Africa) R Fairbank	1	4
(United States) H Ludloff	1	1
6	(United States) K Jordan	6	6

Second round
9	(Australia) W Turnbull	6	6
(United Kingdom) A Brown	3	4
(United States) F Raschiatore	3	4
Q	(Soviet Union) S Cherneva	6	6
WC	(United Kingdom) J Salmon	6	7
(South Africa) B Mould	4	6
(Romania) V Ruzici	4	4
6	(United States) K Jordan	6	6

Third round
9	(Australia) W Turnbull	6	4	6
Q	(Soviet Union) S Cherneva	3	6	4
WC	(United Kingdom) J Salmon	4	3
6	(United States) K Jordan	6	6

Fourth round
9	(Australia) W Turnbull	2	3
6	(United States) K Jordan	6	6

=== Bottom half ===
==== Section 5 ====
First round
8	(United States) K Horvath	6	6
(United States) G Purdy	4	3
(West Germany) B Bunge	6	6
Q	(Canada) H Pelletier	1	2
(United Kingdom) S Barker	2	6	6
(South Africa) R Mentz	6	4	4
(United States) S Mascarin	4	7	8
(West Germany) S Graf	6	5	10
(United States) K Rinaldi	4	2
Q	(United States) K Steinmetz	6	6
(United States) T Mochizuki	7	6
(Czechoslovakia) K Skronská	6	0
(United States) K Sands	6	6	2
(United States) E Burgin	7	3	6
(United States) K Shaefer	2	7	0
10	(United Kingdom) J Durie	6	6	6

Second round
8	(United States) K Horvath	0	4
(West Germany) B Bunge	6	6
(United Kingdom) S Barker	6	3
(West Germany) S Graf	7	6
Q	(United States) K Steinmetz	7	6
(United States) T Mochizuki	6	3
(United States) E Burgin	1	3
10	(United Kingdom) J Durie	6	6

Third round
(West Germany) B Bunge	5	3
(West Germany) S Graf	7	6
Q	(United States) K Steinmetz	4	2
10	(United Kingdom) J Durie	6	6

Fourth round
(West Germany) S Graf	6	3	7
10	(United Kingdom) J Durie	3	6	9

==== Section 6 ====
First round
14	(Czechoslovakia) H Suková	6	6
(Italy) R Reggi	3	4
(United States) K Cummings	6	4	0
(Italy) A-M Cecchini	4	6	6
(Austria) P Huber	1	4
(United States) P Casale	6	6
(Peru) P Vásquez	7	7
(United States) S Acker	5	6
Q	(United States) K Kinney	6	6
(United States) P Teeguarden	7	7
(France) C Tanvier	6	6	8
WC	(United Kingdom) S Reeves	7	4	6
(Sweden) C Lindqvist	6	7
(United States) L Allen	3	6
Q	(Soviet Union) E Eliseenko	1	0
3	(Czechoslovakia) H Mandlíková	6	6

Second round
14	(Czechoslovakia) H Suková	6	6
(Italy) A-M Cecchini	3	0
(United States) P Casale	6	6
(Peru) P Vásquez	2	0
(United States) P Teeguarden	1	4
(France) C Tanvier	6	6
(Sweden) C Lindqvist	5	3
3	(Czechoslovakia) H Mandlíková	7	6

Third round
14	(Czechoslovakia) H Suková	7	6	6
(United States) P Casale	6	7	4
(France) C Tanvier	4	6
3	(Czechoslovakia) H Mandlíková	6	7

Fourth round
14	(Czechoslovakia) H Suková	4	1
3	(Czechoslovakia) H Mandlíková	6	6

==== Section 7 ====
First round
5	(United States) Z Garrison	6	6
WC	(United Kingdom) R Einy	0	0
(United States) A Henricksson	6	3	4
(United Kingdom) V Wade	3	6	6
(Switzerland) C Jolissaint	7	2	6
(United States) L McNeil	5	6	3
Q	(Sweden) C Karlsson	7	2	8
(United States) A White	5	6	6
(France) S Amiach	6	6
(United States) L Antonoplis	3	1
(United States) T Holladay	6	3	4
(Australia) S Leo	2	6	6
(Brazil) C Monteiro	4	6	9
(United States) A-M Fernandez	6	2	7
(United States) J Golder	4	1
15	(Hungary) A Temesvári	6	6

Second round
5	(United States) Z Garrison	6	4	5
(United Kingdom) V Wade	3	6	7
(Switzerland) C Jolissaint	6	3	4
Q	(Sweden) C Karlsson	2	6	6
(France) S Amiach	1^{r}
(Australia) S Leo	4
(Brazil) C Monteiro	4	1
15	(Hungary) A Temesvári	6	6

Third round
(United Kingdom) V Wade	2	6	9
Q	(Sweden) C Karlsson	6	4	11
(Australia) S Leo	2	2
15	(Hungary) A Temesvári	6	6

Fourth round
Q	(Sweden) C Karlsson	6	7
15	(Hungary) A Temesvári	4	5

==== Section 8 ====
First round
12	(West Germany) C Kohde-Kilsch	6	6
(United States) B Bramblett	1	4
(United States) T Phelps	6	4
(Italy) S Simmonds	7	6
WC	(United Kingdom) S Gomer	2	6
(United States) A Kiyomura-Hayashi	6	7
(United States) N Yeargin	1	4
(Australia) A Minter	6	6
(United States) M Torres	6	6	10
(Brazil) P Medrado	2	7	8
(Switzerland) P Jauch-Delhees	3	0
(United Kingdom) A Croft	6	6
(United States) E Nagelsen	6	6
(United States) R Casals	3	1
(Socialist Federal Republic of Yugoslavia) S Goleš	1	1
2	(United States) C Evert Lloyd	6	6

Second round
12	(West Germany) C Kohde-Kilsch	6	6
(Italy) S Simmonds	1	2
(United States) A Kiyomura-Hayashi	6	1	12
(Australia) A Minter	3	6	10
(United States) M Torres	3	6	5
(United Kingdom) A Croft	6	2	7
(United States) B Nagelsen	2	6	2
2	(United States) C Evert Lloyd	6	4	6

Third round
12	(West Germany) C Kohde-Kilsch	6	6
(United States) A Kiyomura-Hayashi	3	1
(United Kingdom) A Croft	3	4
2	(United States) C Evert Lloyd	6	6

Fourth round
12	(West Germany) C Kohde-Kilsch	2	4
2	(United States) C Evert Lloyd	6	6

== See also ==
- Evert–Navratilova rivalry

Preceded by 1984 French Open – Women's singles	Grand Slam women's singles	Succeeded by 1984 US Open – Women's singles
