= 1984 Wimbledon Championships – Men's singles =

Men's singles
- 1984 Wimbledon Championships

Final
- Champion: (United States) John McEnroe
- Runner-up: (United States) Jimmy Connors
- Score: 6–1, 6–1, 6–2

Details
- Draw: 128 (16Q / 8WC)
- Seeds: 16

Events
| Singles | men | women | | boys | girls |
| Doubles | men | women | mixed | boys | girls |
| WC Singles | men | women | quad |
| WC Doubles | men | women | quad |
| Legends | men | women | seniors |
- Wimbledon Championships

Defending champion John McEnroe defeated Jimmy Connors in the final, 6–1, 6–1, 6–2 to win the gentlemen's singles tennis title at the 1984 Wimbledon Championships. It was his third Wimbledon singles title and sixth major singles title overall. The final was for a long time referred to as the greatest display in the history of tennis; it lasted only 80 minutes and McEnroe made just four unforced errors during the entire match (none in the first set).

This tournament marked the first major appearance of future world No. 1, three-time Wimbledon champion, and six-time major champion Boris Becker, he was just 16 years, 216 days old at the start of the tournament. He would go on to win the title the following year, 1985, and in 1986 he would become the youngest man to defend a major title, a record that still stands today.

== Seeds ==
1. (United States) John McEnroe (champion)
2. (Czechoslovakia) Ivan Lendl (semifinals)
3. (United States) Jimmy Connors (final)
4. (Sweden) Mats Wilander (second round)
5. (United States) Jimmy Arias (fourth round)
6. (Ecuador) Andrés Gómez (quarterfinals)
7. (France) Yannick Noah (withdrew)
8. (Argentina) José Luis Clerc (withdrew)
9. (Sweden) Henrik Sundström (second round)
10. (Sweden) Anders Järryd (first round)
11. (South Africa) Kevin Curren (fourth round)
12. (United States) Johan Kriek (fourth round)
13. (Czechoslovakia) Tomáš Šmíd (quarterfinals)
14. (United States) Bill Scanlon (fourth round)
15. (United States) Vitas Gerulaitis (fourth round)
16. (United States) Tim Mayotte (fourth round)

Click on the seed number of a player to go to their draw section.

Yannick Noah and José Luis Clerc withdrew due to injury and illness respectively. They were replaced in the draw by qualifier Paul Annacone and lucky loser Claudio Mezzadri respectively.

== Draw ==
Key

- Q = Qualifier
- WC = Wild card
- LL = Lucky loser
- Alt = Alternate
- ITF = ITF entry
- PR = Protected ranking
- SR = Special ranking
- SE = Special exempt
- JE = Junior exempt
- JR = Junior Accelerator Programme entrant
- CO = College Accelerator Programme entrant
- NG = Next Gen Accelerator Program entrant
- w/o = Walkover
- r = Retired
- d = Defaulted

=== Finals ===
Quarterfinals
1 | (United States) John McEnroe | 6 | 6 | 6
(United States) John Sadri | 3 | 3 | 1
(Australia) Pat Cash | 6 | 6 | 6 | 7
6 | (Ecuador) Andrés Gómez | 4 | 4 | 7 | 6
Q | (United States) Paul Annacone | 2 | 4 | 2
3 | (United States) Jimmy Connors | 6 | 6 | 6
13 | (Czechoslovakia) Tomáš Šmíd | 1 | 6 | 3
2 | (Czechoslovakia) Ivan Lendl | 6 | 7 | 6

Semifinals
1 | (United States) John McEnroe | 6 | 7 | 6
(Australia) Pat Cash | 3 | 6 | 4
3 | (United States) Jimmy Connors | 6 | 6 | 7 | 6
2 | (Czechoslovakia) Ivan Lendl | 7 | 3 | 5 | 1

Final
1 | (United States) John McEnroe | 6 | 6 | 6
3 | (United States) Jimmy Connors | 1 | 1 | 2

=== Top half ===
==== Section 1 ====
First round
1 | (United States) John McEnroe | 6 | 6 | 6 | 6
(Australia) Paul McNamee | 4 | 4 | 7 | 1
(Spain) Emilio Sánchez | 6 | 3 | 6 | 7 | 3
(United States) Rodney Harmon | 7 | 6 | 4 | 5 | 6
(Poland) Wojciech Fibak | 5 | 6 | 2 | 1
(Switzerland) Jakob Hlasek | 7 | 4 | 6 | 6
(Australia) Simon Youl | 4 | 6 | 4 | 6 | 3
(Australia) Wally Masur | 6 | 4 | 6 | 4 | 6
(United States) Blaine Willenborg | 0 | 0 | 4
Q | (West Germany) Boris Becker | 6 | 6 | 6
Q | (United States) Jeff Turpin | 2 | 5 | 6
(Nigeria) Nduka Odizor | 6 | 7 | 7
(United States) Marcel Freeman | 3 | 6 | 1 | 5
LL | (Israel) Shahar Perkiss | 6 | 4 | 6 | 7
(United States) Eric Korita | 6 | 7 | 2 | 6 | 11
14 | (United States) Bill Scanlon | 7 | 6 | 6 | 3 | 13

Second round
1 | (United States) J McEnroe | 6 | 6 | 7
(United States) R Harmon | 1 | 3 | 5
(Switzerland) J Hlasek | 4 | 2 | 5
(Australia) W Masur | 6 | 6 | 7
Q | (West Germany) B Becker | 6 | 6 | 4
(Nigeria) N Odizor | 3 | 4 | 2^{r}
LL | (Israel) S Perkiss | 2 | 3 | 3
14 | (United States) W Scanlon | 6 | 6 | 6

Third round
1 | (United States) J McEnroe | 6 | 6 | 6
(Australia) W Masur | 0 | 4 | 3
Q | (West Germany) B Becker | 2 | 6 | 6 | 2^{r}
14 | (United States) W Scanlon | 6 | 2 | 7 | 1

Fourth round
1 | (United States) J McEnroe | 6 | 6 | 6
14 | (United States) W Scanlon | 3 | 3 | 1

==== Section 2 ====
First round
15 | (United States) Vitas Gerulaitis | 3 | 6 | 6 | 6 | 7
(United States) Tony Giammalva | 6 | 1 | 4 | 7 | 5
(Hungary) Balázs Taróczy | 6 | 4 | 6 | 7
WC | (United Kingdom) Richard Lewis | 4 | 6 | 4 | 6
Q | (South Africa) Eddie Edwards | 7 | 3 | 6 | 6
(United States) Chip Hooper | 6 | 6 | 1 | 3
(United States) Peter Fleming | 6 | 6 | 4 | 2 | 3
(United States) Brad Gilbert | 4 | 4 | 6 | 6 | 6
(Sweden) Jan Gunnarsson | 3 | 7 | 2 | 3
(United States) John Sadri | 6 | 6 | 6 | 6
(Peru) Pablo Arraya | 6 | 3 | 7 | 4
(United States) Mike Leach | 7 | 6 | 6 | 6
(Chile) Ricardo Acuña | 7 | 1 | 4 | 6 | 6
(Brazil) João Soares | 6 | 6 | 6 | 4 | 4
Q | (Australia) Craig Miller | 6 | 3 | 6 | 6
LL | (Switzerland) Claudio Mezzadri | 3 | 6 | 3 | 4

Second round
15 | (United States) V Gerulaitis | 6 | 7 | 4 | 6
(Hungary) B Taróczy | 3 | 5 | 6 | 4
Q | (South Africa) E Edwards | 3 | 6 | 6 | 6 | 6
(United States) B Gilbert | 6 | 7 | 3 | 4 | 8
(United States) J Sadri | 7 | 3 | 6 | 6
(United States) M Leach | 6 | 6 | 4 | 4
(Chile) R Acuña | 3 | 6 | 6 | 6
Q | (Australia) C Miller | 6 | 3 | 2 | 4

Third round
15 | (United States) V Gerulaitis | 7 | 6 | 3 | 6
(United States) B Gilbert | 6 | 1 | 6 | 4
(United States) J Sadri | 7 | 7 | 7
(Chile) R Acuña | 5 | 6 | 5

Fourth round
15 | (United States) V Gerulaitis | 3 | 5 | 7 | 6 | 3
(United States) J Sadri | 6 | 7 | 6 | 4 | 6

==== Section 3 ====
First round
4 | (Sweden) Mats Wilander | 6 | 6 | 6 | 7
Q | (United States) Sherwood Stewart | 4 | 4 | 7 | 5
(Australia) Pat Cash | 7 | 6 | 6
(United States) Robert Seguso | 6 | 4 | 4
(Australia) John Fitzgerald | 6 | 6 | 6
(United States) David Pate | 3 | 4 | 4
WC | (United Kingdom) Jeremy Bates | 3 | 3 | 1
(Brazil) Cássio Motta | 6 | 6 | 6
(Italy) Simone Colombo | 6 | 2 | 6 | 4
(India) Ramesh Krishnan | 4 | 6 | 7 | 6
(Switzerland) Roland Stadler | 3 | 2 | 2
(New Zealand) Chris Lewis | 6 | 6 | 6
(United States) Ben Testerman | 6 | 6 | 6
(United Kingdom) Colin Dowdeswell | 4 | 3 | 3
(United States) Steve Denton | 4 | 6 | 6 | 6 | 4
11 | (South Africa) Kevin Curren | 6 | 3 | 4 | 7 | 6

Second round
4 | (Sweden) M Wilander | 7 | 4 | 2 | 4
(Australia) P Cash | 6 | 6 | 6 | 6
(Australia) J Fitzgerald | 6 | 6 | 4 | 1
(Brazil) C Motta | 7 | 4 | 6 | 6
(India) R Krishnan | 6 | 6 | 6
(New Zealand) C Lewis | 3 | 3 | 3
(United States) B Testerman | 6 | 1 | 6 | 2
11 | (South Africa) K Curren | 7 | 6 | 4 | 6

Third round
(Australia) P Cash | 6 | 6 | 6
(Brazil) C Motta | 1 | 2 | 4
(India) R Krishnan | 2 | 6 | 6 | 6
11 | (South Africa) K Curren | 6 | 3 | 7 | 7

Fourth round
(Australia) P Cash | 4 | 6 | 7 | 6
11 | (South Africa) K Curren | 6 | 2 | 6 | 1

==== Section 4 ====
First round
9 | (Sweden) Henrik Sundström | 6 | 7 | 7
(Belgium) Bernard Boileau | 4 | 6 | 5
(Australia) Mark Edmondson | 6 | 6 | 6
(United States) Mel Purcell | 4 | 3 | 4
Q | (United States) Ken Flach | 2 | 6 | 7 | 6
(United States) Robert Van't Hof | 6 | 4 | 6 | 3
(United States) Vincent Van Patten | 6 | 3 | 2 | 2
(United States) Terry Moor | 4 | 6 | 6 | 6
(United States) Brian Teacher | 6 | 6 | 3 | 6 | 4
(Canada) Glenn Michibata | 7 | 2 | 6 | 2 | 6
(Switzerland) Heinz Günthardt | 2 | 0 | 3
Q | (France) Guy Forget | 6 | 6 | 6
WC | (United Kingdom) Steve Shaw | 6 | 6 | 6
(Italy) Claudio Panatta | 4 | 2 | 4
(United States) Matt Mitchell | 6 | 6 | 1 | 6
6 | (Ecuador) Andrés Gómez | 3 | 7 | 6 | 7

Second round
9 | (Sweden) H Sundström | 7 | 6 | 4 | 7 | 6
(Australia) M Edmondson | 6 | 7 | 6 | 6 | 8
Q | (United States) K Flach | 4 | 5 | 2
(United States) T Moor | 6 | 7 | 6
(Canada) G Michibata | 6 | 3 | 4
Q | (France) G Forget | 7 | 6 | 6
WC | (United Kingdom) S Shaw | 6 | 6 | 2
6 | (Ecuador) A Gómez | 7 | 7 | 6

Third round
(Australia) M Edmondson | 3 | 4 | 6 | 6 | 2
(United States) T Moor | 6 | 6 | 3 | 4 | 6
Q | (France) G Forget | 3 | 4 | 6 | 6 | 7
6 | (Ecuador) A Gómez | 6 | 6 | 4 | 1 | 9

Fourth round
(United States) T Moor | 0 | 1 | 6
6 | (Ecuador) A Gómez | 6 | 6 | 7

=== Bottom half ===
==== Section 5 ====
First round
Q | (United States) Paul Annacone | 7 | 6 | 6
WC | (United Kingdom) Jonathan Smith | 6 | 3 | 4
Q | (Brazil) Carlos Alberto Kirmayr | 6 | 6 | 6 | 2 | 3
(United States) Mark Dickson | 4 | 7 | 3 | 6 | 6
Q | (South Africa) Christo van Rensburg | 6 | 6 | 6
(Socialist Federal Republic of Yugoslavia) Marko Ostoja | 2 | 2 | 3
(United States) Matt Doyle | 3 | 7 | 6 | 6 | 7
(United States) Sandy Mayer | 6 | 5 | 3 | 7 | 5
(West Germany) Hans Schwaier | 6 | 6 | 6
(India) Vijay Amritraj | 3 | 4 | 2
(United States) Steve Meister | 6 | 3 | 7 | 7
(West Germany) Hans-Dieter Beutel | 2 | 6 | 6 | 5
(Australia) Brad Drewett | 4 | 6 | 6 | 2
(Sweden) Stefan Edberg | 6 | 3 | 7 | 6
(West Germany) Michael Westphal | 3 | 0 | 6 | 7 | 2
12 | (United States) Johan Kriek | 6 | 6 | 2 | 6 | 6

Second round
Q | (United States) P Annacone | 7 | 7 | 3 | 6
(United States) M Dickson | 6 | 6 | 6 | 1
Q | (South Africa) C van Rensburg | 4 | 6 | 7 | 7
(United States) M Doyle | 6 | 2 | 5 | 6
(West Germany) H Schwaier | 1 | 3 | 5
(United States) S Meister | 6 | 6 | 7
(Sweden) S Edberg | 6 | 7 | 4 | 1 | 1
12 | (United States) J Kriek | 4 | 6 | 6 | 6 | 6

Third round
Q | (United States) P Annacone | 6 | 4 | 6 | 6
Q | (South Africa) C van Rensburg | 3 | 6 | 4 | 2
(United States) S Meister | 2 | 7 | 4 | 1
12 | (United States) J Kriek | 6 | 5 | 6 | 6

Fourth round
Q | (United States) P Annacone | 6 | 6 | 6
12 | (United States) J Kriek | 3 | 2 | 4

==== Section 6 ====
First round
16 | (United States) Tim Mayotte | 7 | 7 | 6
(Brazil) Marcos Hocevar | 5 | 6 | 1
(Paraguay) Francisco González | 6 | 1 | 6 | 6 | 6
(United States) Brian Gottfried | 2 | 6 | 2 | 7 | 2
Q | (New Zealand) Russell Simpson | 6 | 6 | 7 | 1 | 3
(United States) Tim Gullikson | 7 | 4 | 6 | 6 | 6
LL | (Netherlands) Michiel Schapers | 2 | 7 | 6 | 6
(United States) Leif Shiras | 6 | 6 | 7 | 7
(United States) Martin Davis | 6 | 7 | 6
Q | (United States) Bruce Manson | 3 | 6 | 3
Q | (United States) Bud Cox | 4 | 3 | 7 | 6 | 4
Q | (United States) Craig Wittus | 6 | 6 | 5 | 2 | 6
(Sweden) Stefan Simonsson | 4 | 6 | 3 | 6 | 6
(Israel) Shlomo Glickstein | 6 | 2 | 6 | 3 | 4
(United States) Lloyd Bourne | 5 | 5 | 4
3 | (United States) Jimmy Connors | 7 | 7 | 6

Second round
16 | (United States) T Mayotte | 7 | 7 | 7
(Paraguay) F González | 5 | 6 | 6
(United States) Ti Gullikson | 3 | 6 | 6 | 6
(United States) L Shiras | 6 | 3 | 4 | 4
(United States) M Davis | 6 | 6 | 6
Q | (United States) C Wittus | 3 | 4 | 3
(Sweden) S Simonsson | 2 | 1 | 3
3 | (United States) J Connors | 6 | 6 | 6

Third round
(United States) T Mayotte | 6 | 6 | 6
(United States) Ti Gullikson | 4 | 3 | 4
(United States) M Davis | 4 | 7 | 3 | 4
3 | (United States) J Connors | 6 | 6 | 6 | 6

Fourth round
16 | (United States) T Mayotte | 7 | 2 | 0 | 2
3 | (United States) J Connors | 6 | 6 | 6 | 6

==== Section 7 ====
First round
5 | (United States) Jimmy Arias | 3 | 6 | 6 | 6
(South Africa) Bernard Mitton | 6 | 3 | 2 | 4
(United States) Van Winitsky | 4 | 3 | 6 | 0
(Italy) Gianni Ocleppo | 6 | 6 | 4 | 6
Q | (United States) Tom Cain | 3 | 3^{r}
(Czechoslovakia) Miloslav Mečíř | 6 | 4
(United States) Jim Gurfein | 2 | 4 | 1
(South Africa) Danie Visser | 6 | 6 | 6
WC | (United Kingdom) Stuart Bale | 7 | 3 | 4 | 7 | 6
(Australia) John Alexander | 6 | 6 | 6 | 6 | 2
(United States) Hank Pfister | 3 | 4 | 7 | 2
(United States) Tom Gullikson | 6 | 6 | 5 | 6
Q | (Australia) Mark Kratzmann | 6 | 6 | 6 | 6
WC | (United Kingdom) Nick Fulwood | 7 | 4 | 2 | 1
(United States) Larry Stefanki | 4 | 7 | 6 | 4 | 2
13 | (Czechoslovakia) Tomáš Šmíd | 6 | 6 | 0 | 6 | 6

Second round
5 | (United States) J Arias | 7 | 5 | 3 | 7 | 6
(Italy) G Ocleppo | 5 | 7 | 6 | 6 | 4
(Czechoslovakia) M Mečíř | 3 | 2 | 4
(South Africa) D Visser | 6 | 6 | 6
WC | (United Kingdom) S Bale | 5 | 3 | 4
(United States) To Gullikson | 7 | 6 | 6
Q | (Australia) M Kratzmann | 3 | 6 | 7 | 6 | 6
13 | (Czechoslovakia) T Šmíd | 6 | 2 | 6 | 7 | 8

Third round
5 | (United States) J Arias | 5 | 6 | 7 | 6
(South Africa) D Visser | 7 | 3 | 6 | 1
(United States) To Gullikson | 5 | 6 | 2
13 | (Czechoslovakia) T Šmíd | 7 | 7 | 6

Fourth round
5 | (United States) J Arias | 5 | 4 | 3
13 | (Czechoslovakia) T Šmíd | 7 | 6 | 6

==== Section 8 ====
First round
10 | (Sweden) Anders Järryd | 6 | 4 | 3 | 2
(United States) Scott Davis | 4 | 6 | 6 | 6
(Sweden) Joakim Nyström | 5 | 7 | 6 | 7
(United States) Tim Wilkison | 7 | 6 | 4 | 5
(United States) Greg Holmes | 6 | 6 | 6 | 6
WC | (United Kingdom) John Feaver | 1 | 3 | 7 | 2
(United Kingdom) John Lloyd | 3 | 6 | 3 | 6 | 6
(West Germany) Andreas Maurer | 6 | 3 | 6 | 4 | 3
(West Germany) Rolf Gehring | 6 | 6 | 7 | 6
(Czechoslovakia) Pavel Složil | 4 | 7 | 5 | 2
(United States) Gene Mayer | 6 | 2 | 6 | 6 | 6
(Hungary) Zoltan Kuharszky | 7 | 6 | 4 | 1 | 8
(South Africa) Derek Tarr | 6 | 1 | 6 | 6
(France) Christophe Roger-Vasselin | 4 | 6 | 2 | 1
WC | (United States) Dick Stockton | 6 | 0 | 3 | 7 | 4
2 | (Czechoslovakia) Ivan Lendl | 4 | 6 | 6 | 5 | 6

Second round
(United States) S Davis | 6 | 7 | 6 | 6
(Sweden) J Nyström | 1 | 5 | 7 | 1
(United States) G Holmes | 6 | 3 | 4 | 1
(United Kingdom) J Lloyd | 4 | 6 | 6 | 6
(West Germany) R Gehring | 7 | 7 | 6
(Hungary) Z Kuhárszky | 6 | 5 | 3
(South Africa) D Tarr | 3 | 1 | 3
2 | (Czechoslovakia) I Lendl | 6 | 6 | 6

Third round
(United States) S Davis | 6 | 6 | 7
(United Kingdom) J Lloyd | 4 | 4 | 6
(West Germany) R Gehring | 4 | 2 | 6
2 | (Czechoslovakia) I Lendl | 6 | 6 | 7

Fourth round
(United States) S Davis | 6 | 4 | 4 | 7 | 5
2 | (Czechoslovakia) I Lendl | 4 | 6 | 6 | 5 | 7

| Preceded by 1984 French Open | Grand Slams; Men's Singles | Succeeded by 1984 US Open |
