= Viktoria Milvidskaia Belinsky =

Soviet tennis player

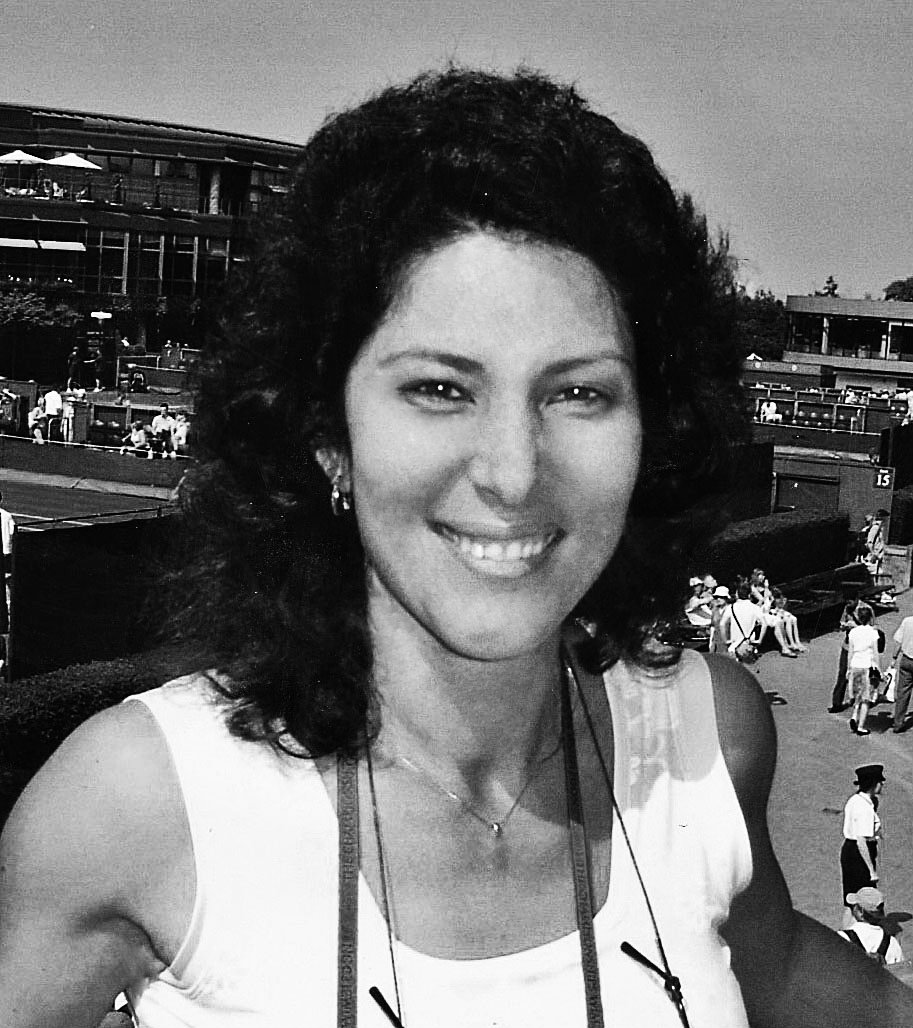
- Full name: Viktoria Mikhailovna Milvidskaia
- Country (sports): Soviet Union; Russia
- Residence: New York City and Miami, United States
- Born: 20 April 1967 (age 59) Moscow, Soviet Union
- Turned pro: 1983
- Retired: 1994
- Plays: Right-handed (two-handed backhand)
- Prize money: $71,427

Singles
- Career record: 99–65
- Career titles: 0 WTA, 1 ITF
- Highest ranking: No. 168 (28 September 1992)

Grand Slam singles results
- Australian Open: Q2 (1991)
- French Open: Q1 (1991)
- Wimbledon: Q2 (1992)
- US Open: 2R (1992)

Doubles
- Career record: 84–39
- Career titles: 0 WTA, 14 ITF
- Highest ranking: No. 145 (29 October 1990)

Grand Slam doubles results
- Australian Open: 1R (1991)
- French Open: 1R (1991)
Medal record
Representing the Soviet Union
Universiade
Gold medal – first place	1987 Zagreb	Doubles
Friendship Games
Silver medal – second place	1984	Women's singles
Bronze medal – third place	1984	Women's doubles

Viktoria Mikhailovna Belinsky (née Milvidskaia, 20 April 1967) is a former professional tennis player from Russia. Her highest WTA rankings were 168 in singles and 145 in doubles.

== Early life ==
Belinsky began playing tennis at the age of seven in Moscow. She played for the famous Spartak tennis club, and her coaches were Alexandra Granaturova and Larisa Preobrazhenskaya.

In 1983, she won the First International Tournament in Moscow which earned her the honour of Master of Sports of the USSR, International Class (equates to international champion).

== Professional career ==
She was a member of the USSR national tennis team (1983–1989) and represented the USSR in many different tournaments around the world. In 1984, she became the youngest USSR national champion.

Belinsky played in all Grand Slam tournaments. She had career wins over Manon Bollegraf, Tami Whitlinger, Sandra Wasserman, Nicole Arendt, Inés Gorrochategui, Lubomira Bacheva, Regina Maršíková, Andrea Strnadová, Sabine Hack, and Radka Bobková, and stopped playing in 1993 due to a knee injury. The same year, she moved to the United States.

Belinsky has an M.A. in physical education from the State Institute of Physical Culture and Sports in Moscow. She received this degree in May 1989.

From 2005 to 2008, Belinsky worked at the Russian NTV PLUS Tennis Channel. Her program was titled Tennis coach – is it nature or nurtured?. She interviewed many famous tennis coaches including: Wayne Bryan, Nick Bollettieri, Bud Collins, Robert Lansdorp, Carlos Rodriguez, Richard Williams. In addition, she has interviewed players such as Serena Williams, Andy Roddick, Anna Kournikova, Marat Safin and Janko Tipsarević. She worked as a sports broadcaster at the Olympic Games in Beijing (2008), and as a tennis analyst at Wimbledon, the US Open, the Davis Cup, and the Federation Cup.

In 2014, Belinsky worked as a coach for the USTA Player Development program in New York City.

In 2015, she moved to Florida and began working as a private coach.

== Junior Grand Slam finals ==
=== Girls' doubles: 1 (runner-up) ===
Result	Year	Championship	Surface	Partner	Opponents	Score
Loss	1984	Wimbledon	Grass	(Soviet Union) Larisa Savchenko	(United States) Caroline Kuhlman (United States) Stephanie Rehe	3–6, 7–5, 4–6

== ITF finals ==
$100,000 tournaments
$75,000 tournaments
$50,000 tournaments
$25,000 tournaments
$10,000 tournaments

=== Singles (1–4) ===
Result	No.	Date	Tournament	Surface	Opponent	Score
Loss	1.	8 September 1986	Zagreb, Yugoslavia	Hard	(Switzerland) Lilian Kelaidis	2–6, 7–5, 3–6
Win	2.	30 March 1987	Bari, Italy	Clay	(Soviet Union) Aida Halatian	1–6, 6–1, 7–5
Loss	3.	14 September 1987	Sofia, Bulgaria	Clay	(Soviet Union) Eugenia Maniokova	1–6, 0–6
Loss	4.	9 April 1990	Bari, Italy	Clay	(Italy) Laura Golarsa	3–6, 4–6
Loss	5.	16 July 1990	Darmstadt, West Germany	Clay	(Argentina) Cristina Tessi	1–6, 6–7

=== Doubles (14–2) ===
Result	No.	Date	Tournament	Surface	Partner	Opponents	Score
Win	1.	30 December 1986	Chicago, United States	Hard	(Soviet Union) Natalia Egorova	(United States) Elizabeth Evans (United States) Jennifer Prah	6–1, 6–1
Loss	2.	6 January 1986	El Paso, United States	Clay	(Soviet Union) Natasha Zvereva	(United States) Cammy MacGregor (United States) Cynthia MacGregor	6–4, 3–6, 4–6
Win	3.	8 September 1986	Zagreb, Yugoslavia	Clay	(Soviet Union) Natalia Egorova	(Socialist Federal Republic of Yugoslavia) Renata Šašak (Socialist Federal Republic of Yugoslavia) Karmen Škulj	6–2, 6–3
Win	4.	15 September 1986	Sofia, Bulgaria	Clay	(Soviet Union) Natalia Egorova	(Italy) Laura Golarsa (Netherlands) Marianne van der Torre	6–0, 6–2
Win	5.	30 March 1987	Bari, Italy	Clay	(Soviet Union) Aida Halatian	(Netherlands) Karin van Essen (United Kingdom) Sarah Sullivan	6–2, 2–6, 7–6
Win	6.	20 April 1987	Monviso, Italy	Clay	(Soviet Union) Aida Halatian	(Czechoslovakia) Hana Fukárková (Poland) Iwona Kuczyńska	7–5, 6–3
Win	7.	28 September 1987	Bol, Croatia	Clay	(Soviet Union) Elena Brioukhovets	(Soviet Union) Aida Halatian (Soviet Union) Eugenia Maniokova	6–4, 5–7, 6–4
Win	8.	16 November 1987	Croydon, United Kingdom	Carpet	(Hong Kong) Paulette Moreno	(Soviet Union) Eugenia Maniokova (Soviet Union) Natalia Medvedeva	6–4, 6–1
Win	9.	12 June 1988	Modena, Italy	Clay	(Soviet Union) Eugenia Maniokova	(Indonesia) Yayuk Basuki (Japan) Ei Iida	6–3, 4–6, 6–0
Win	10.	19 June 1988	Salerno, Italy	Clay	(Soviet Union) Eugenia Maniokova	(Finland) Anne Aallonen (Indonesia) Yayuk Basuki	1–6, 7–5, 6–4
Win	11.	26 June 1988	Arezzo, Italy	Clay	(Soviet Union) Eugenia Maniokova	(Indonesia) Yayuk Basuki (Netherlands) Titia Wilmink	0–6, 7–5, 6–1
Win	12.	15 August 1988	Rebecq, Belgium	Clay	(Soviet Union) Elena Brioukhovets	(Israel) Ilana Berger (Israel) Anat Varon	6–2, 6–2
Win	13.	29 August 1988	Nivelles, Belgium	Clay	(Soviet Union) Elena Brioukhovets	(Hungary) Réka Szikszay (Netherlands) Amy van Buuren	1–6, 7–5, 6–1
Win	14.	16 April 1990	Marsa, Malta	Clay	(Soviet Union) Anna Mirza	(Spain) Eva Bes (Spain) Silvia Ramón-Cortés	6–2, 7–6
Loss	15.	30 July 1990	Rheda-Wiedenbrück, Germany	Clay	(Soviet Union) Agnese Blumberga	(Czechoslovakia) Petra Holubová (Czechoslovakia) Sylvia Štefková	4–6, 4–6
Win	16.	8 July 1991	Erlangen, Germany	Clay	(Germany) Maja Živec-Škulj	(Australia) Louise Stacey (Australia) Angie Woolcock	6–4, 6–4

== Other finals ==
=== Singles ===
Result	Year	Championship	Location	Opponent	Score
Win	1984	USSR Tennis National Championship	Tashkent, Soviet Union	(Soviet Union) Oksana Lifanova	6–0, 6–4
Loss	1981	European Junior Championships 14&U	Serramazzoni, Italy	(Bulgaria) Manuela Maleeva	2–6, 4–6
Loss	1987	USSR Tennis National Championship	Tallinn, Soviet Union	(Soviet Union) Natasha Zvereva	1–6, 2–6

Medal	Date	Tournament	Location	Opponent	Score
Silver	August 1984	1984 Friendship Games	Katowice, Poland	(Soviet Union) Elena Yelisieyenko	6–0, 6–4

=== Doubles ===
Result	Year	Championship	Location	Partner	Opponents	Score
Win	1984	European Championship	Ostend, Belgium	(Soviet Union) Natalia Egorova	(France) Isabelle Demongeot (France) Nathalie Tauziat	2–6, 6–3, 6–4
Loss	1981	European Junior Championships 14 & Under	Serramazzoni, Italy	(Soviet Union) Irina Zvereva	(Bulgaria) Manuela Maleeva (Bulgaria) Katerina Maleeva	3–6, 7–5, 1–6

Result	Date	Tournament	Location	Partner	Opponents	Score
Gold	July 1987	1987 Universiade Games	Zagreb, Yugoslavia	(Soviet Union) Leila Meskhi	(Czechoslovakia) Iva Budařová (Czechoslovakia) Nora Bajčíková	6–3, 6–4
