= Digna Ketelaar =

Dutch tennis player

- Full name: Digna Ketelaar
- Country (sports): Netherlands
- Born: 13 August 1967 (age 57); Bosschenhoofd
- Prize money: $7,574

Singles
- Career record: 28–26
- Career titles: 0
- Highest ranking: No. 258 (2 March 1987)

Grand Slam singles results
- French Open: Q2 (1987)
- French Open Junior: 3R (1985)
- Wimbledon Junior: QF (1985)

Doubles
- Career record: 25–20
- Career titles: 1 ITF
- Highest ranking: No. 174 (21 December 1986)

Grand Slam doubles results
- French Open Junior: W (1984)
- Wimbledon Junior: QF (1984)

Team competitions
- Fed Cup: 2–1

Digna Ketelaar (born 13 August 1967) is a former Dutch tennis player. She won one International Tennis Federation doubles title during her career and on 2 March 1987 reached a singles ranking high of world number 258. On 21 December 1986, Ketelaar reached a doubles ranking high of world number 174.

As a junior, Ketelaar became the 1984 French Open girls' doubles champion.

== ITF doubles finals (1–2) ==
Legend $100,000 tournaments $75,000 tournaments $50,000 tournaments $25,000 tournaments $10,000 tournaments	Finals by surface Hard (0–1) Clay (0–0) Grass (1–0) Carpet (0–1)

Outcome	No.	Date	Tournament	Surface	Partner	Opponents	Score
Winner	1.	28 April 1986	Sutton, United Kingdom	Grass	(United States) Susan Pendo	(Sweden) Anneli Björk (Denmark) Lone Vandborg	7–6, 6–0
Runner-up	1.	16 June 1986	Fayetteville, United States	Hard	(Brazil) Themis Zambrzycki	(Netherlands) Carin Bakkum (Netherlands) Manon Bollegraf	3–6, 6–7^{(3–7)}
Runner-up	2.	17 November 1986	Croydon, United Kingdom	Carpet (i)	(Netherlands) Simone Schilder	(United Kingdom) Valda Lake (United Kingdom) Clare Wood	6–7, 6–2, 5–7

== See also ==
- List of French Open champions
