= Ricky Brown (tennis) =

American tennis player

- Country (sports): United States
- Residence: Largo, Florida, United States
- Born: April 1, 1967 (age 58); Hialeah, Florida, United States
- Height: 5 ft 10 in (1.78 m)
- Turned pro: 1985
- Plays: Right-handed
- Prize money: $35,729

Singles
- Career record: 4–17
- Career titles: 0; 0 Challenger, 0 Futures
- Highest ranking: No. 215 (10 November 1986)

Grand Slam singles results
- Australian Open: Q1 (1985)
- US Open: 2R (1984)

Doubles
- Career record: 7–11
- Career titles: 0; 1 Challenger, 0 Futures
- Highest ranking: No. 174 (10 August 1987)
- Last updated on: 14 June 2022.

Ricky Brown (born April 1, 1967) is a former professional tennis player from the United States. He is the younger brother of another professional player Jimmy Brown.

== Career ==
Brown was the top ranked American junior for the 16s age division in 1983 and the following year won an Orange Bowl title (18 and under). He and partner Robbie Weiss were boys' doubles champions at the 1984 Wimbledon Championships. They defeated Mark Kratzmann and Jonas Svensson in the final. Brown made his only Grand Slam appearance at the 1984 US Open, where he defeated former Australian Open winner Mark Edmondson in the opening round, before being eliminated in the second round by Henrik Sundström. He won a Challenger doubles title at Winnetka in 1985.

Currently, he is the Tennis Director for The Sports Club of West Bloomfield in Michigan.

== ATP Challenger and ITF Futures finals ==
=== Doubles: 1 (1–0) ===
| Legend ATP Challenger (1–0) ITF Futures (0–0) | Finals by surface Hard (1–0) Clay (0–0) Grass (0–0) Carpet (0–0) |

| Result | W–L | Date | Tournament | Tier | Surface | Partner | Opponents | Score |
|---|---|---|---|---|---|---|---|---|
| Win | 1–0 | Aug 1985 | Winnetka, United States | Challenger | Hard | (United States) Luke Jensen | (New Zealand) Kelly Evernden (South Africa) Brian Levine | 6–4, 5–7, 6–4 |

== Junior Grand Slam finals ==
=== Doubles: 1 (1 title) ===
| Result | Year | Tournament | Surface | Partner | Opponents | Score |
|---|---|---|---|---|---|---|
| Win | 1984 | Wimbledon | Grass | (United States) Robbie Weiss | (Australia) Mark Kratzmann (Sweden) Jonas Svensson | 1–6, 6–4, 11–9 |
