= 1984 Wimbledon Championships – Women's doubles =

Women's doubles
- 1984 Wimbledon Championships

Final
- Champions: (United States) Martina Navratilova (United States) Pam Shriver
- Runners-up: (United States) Kathy Jordan (United States) Anne Smith
- Score: 6–3, 6–4

Details
- Draw: 64 (4 Q )
- Seeds: 16

Events
Singles	men	women		boys	girls
Doubles	men	women	mixed	boys	girls
WC Singles	men	women	quad
WC Doubles	men	women	quad
Legends	men	women	seniors
← 1983 ·	Wimbledon Championships	· 1985 →

Three-time defending champions Martina Navratilova and Pam Shriver successfully defended their title, defeating Kathy Jordan and Anne Smith in the final, 6–3, 6–4 to win the ladies' doubles tennis title at the 1984 Wimbledon Championships. It was the second step in an eventual Grand Slam for the pair.

== Seeds ==
1. (United States) Martina Navratilova / (United States) Pam Shriver (champions)
2. (United Kingdom) Anne Hobbs / (Australia) Wendy Turnbull (second round)
3. (United States) Kathy Horvath / (Romania) Virginia Ruzici (first round)
4. (United States) Barbara Potter / (United States) Sharon Walsh (semifinals)
5. (South Africa) Rosalyn Fairbank / (United States) Candy Reynolds (quarterfinals)
6. (United Kingdom) Jo Durie / (United States) Ann Kiyomura-Hayashi (semifinals)
7. (United States) Kathy Jordan / (United States) Anne Smith (final)
8. (West Germany) Claudia Kohde-Kilsch / (Czechoslovakia) Hana Mandlíková (quarterfinals)
9. (United States) Andrea Leand / (United States) Mary-Lou Piatek (second round)
10. (Switzerland) Christiane Jolissaint / (Netherlands) Marcella Mesker (second round)
11. (United States) Leslie Allen / (United States) Anne White (third round)
12. (Socialist Federal Republic of Yugoslavia) Mima Jaušovec / (United Kingdom) Virginia Wade (third round)
13. (United States) Barbara Jordan / (Australia) Elizabeth Sayers (second round)
14. (West Germany) Bettina Bunge / (West Germany) Eva Pfaff (first round)
15. n/a
16. (United States) Zina Garrison / (United States) Lori McNeil (second round, withdrew)

Click on the seed number of a player to go to their draw section.

== Draw ==
=== Key ===
- Q = Qualifier
- WC = Wild card
- LL = Lucky loser
- Alt = Alternate
- SE = Special exempt
- PR = Protected ranking
- ITF = ITF entry
- JE = Junior exempt
- w/o = Walkover
- r = Retired
- d = Defaulted
- SR = Special ranking

=== Finals ===
Quarterfinals
1	(United States) Martina Navratilova (United States) Pam Shriver	6	6	6
8	(West Germany) Claudia Kohde-Kilsch (Czechoslovakia) Hana Mandlíková	7	4	2
(Soviet Union) Svetlana Cherneva (Soviet Union) Larisa Savchenko	2	6	4
6	(United Kingdom) Jo Durie (United States) Ann Kiyomura-Hayashi	6	2	6
5	(South Africa) Rosalyn Fairbank (United States) Candy Reynolds	6	6	4
4	(United States) Barbara Potter (United States) Sharon Walsh	3	7	6
7	(United States) Kathy Jordan (United States) Anne Smith	6	6
(United States) Renee Blount (United States) Janet Wright	0	1

Semifinals
1	(United States) Martina Navratilova (United States) Pam Shriver	6	6
6	(United Kingdom) Jo Durie (United States) Ann Kiyomura-Hayashi	3	4
4	(United States) Barbara Potter (United States) Sharon Walsh	6	3	2
7	(United States) Kathy Jordan (United States) Anne Smith	3	6	6

Final
1	(United States) Martina Navratilova (United States) Pam Shriver	6	6
7	(United States) Kathy Jordan (United States) Anne Smith	3	4

=== Top half ===
==== Section 1 ====
First round
1	(United States) M Navratilova (United States) P Shriver	6	6
(United States) P Casale (Romania) L Romanov	1	1
(United States) T Phelps (United States) M Torres	6	5
(United States) M Louie (United States) H Ludloff	7	7
(South Africa) I Kloss (Netherlands) B Stöve	3	1
(United States) L Bonder (United States) S Mascarin	6	6
(United States) K Copeland (Canada) J Hetherington	4	5
16	(United States) Z Garrison (United States) L McNeil	6	7
12	(Socialist Federal Republic of Yugoslavia) M Jaušovec (United Kingdom) V Wade	7	6
(South Africa) J Mundel (South Africa) R Uys	5	2
Q	(United States) C Copeland (United States) T Mochizuki	3	4
(New Zealand) C Newton (Australia) P Whytcross	6	6
(United States) S Acker (United States) E Nagelsen	6	6	6
(United States) H Crowe (United States) K Steinmetz	4	7	3
(United States) G Purdy (Italy) R Reggi	5	0
8	(West Germany) C Kohde-Kilsch (Czechoslovakia) H Mandlíková	7	6

Second round
1	(United States) M Navratilova (United States) P Shriver	6	6
(United States) M Louie (United States) H Ludloff	4	1
(United States) L Bonder (United States) S Mascarin	w/o
16	(United States) Z Garrison (United States) L McNeil
12	(Socialist Federal Republic of Yugoslavia) M Jaušovec (United Kingdom) V Wade	6	6
(New Zealand) C Newton (Australia) P Whytcross	1	3
(United States) S Acker (United States) E Nagelsen	6	2
8	(West Germany) C Kohde-Kilsch (Czechoslovakia) H Mandlíková	7	6

Third round
1	(United States) M Navratilova (United States) P Shriver	6	6
(United States) L Bonder (United States) S Mascarin	0	0
12	(Socialist Federal Republic of Yugoslavia) M Jaušovec (United Kingdom) V Wade	3	6	0
8	(West Germany) C Kohde-Kilsch (Czechoslovakia) H Mandlíková	6	2	6

Quarterfinals
1	(United States) M Navratilova (United States) P Shriver	6	6	6
8	(West Germany) C Kohde-Kilsch (Czechoslovakia) H Mandlíková	7	4	2

==== Section 2 ====
First round
3	(United States) K Horvath (Romania) V Ruzici	4	3
(Soviet Union) S Cherneva (Soviet Union) L Savchenko	6	6
(Australia) B Remilton (Japan) N Sato	4	2
(United States) L Antonoplis (South Africa) B Mould	6	6
Q	(United States) K Cummings (United States) R White	4	6
(United States) C Evert Lloyd (France) C Tanvier	6	7
Q	(United States) M Quinlan (United States) M Van Nostrand	4	2
13	(United States) K Jordan (Australia) E Sayers	6	6
10	(Switzerland) C Jolissaint (Netherlands) M Mesker	6	6
(United States) S Foltz (Australia) N Gregory	2	4
(United Kingdom) S Gomer (United Kingdom) J Salmon	2	3
(United States) C Benjamin (United States) F Raschiatore	6	6
(Brazil) C Monteiro (South Africa) Y Vermaak	6	6
(United Kingdom) L Gracie (United Kingdom) E Jones	1	2
(Switzerland) L Drescher (Japan) E Inoue	1	3
6	(United Kingdom) J Durie (United States) A Kiyomura-Hayashi	6	6

Second round
(Soviet Union) S Cherneva (Soviet Union) L Savchenko	6	6
(United States) L Antonoplis (South Africa) B Mould	4	3
(United States) C Evert Lloyd (France) C Tanvier	6	3	6
13	(United States) B Jordan (Australia) E Sayers	3	6	2
10	(Switzerland) C Jolissaint (Netherlands) M Mesker	6	3	4
(United States) C Benjamin (United States) F Raschiatore	1	6	6
(Brazil) C Monteiro (South Africa) Y Vermaak	2	4
6	(United Kingdom) J Durie (United States) A Kiyomura-Hayashi	6	6

Third round
(Soviet Union) S Cherneva (Soviet Union) L Savchenko	3	7	14
(United States) C Evert Lloyd (France) C Tanvier	6	6	12
(United States) C Benjamin (United States) F Raschiatore	4	0
6	(United Kingdom) J Durie (United States) A Kiyomura-Hayashi	6	6

Quarterfinals
(Soviet Union) S Cherneva (Soviet Union) L Savchenko	2	6	4
6	(United Kingdom) J Durie (United States) A Kiyomura-Hayashi	6	2	6

=== Bottom half ===
==== Section 3 ====
First round
5	(South Africa) R Fairbank (United States) C Reynolds	6	6
LL	(Sweden) C Anderholm (Japan) M Yanagi	1	1
LL	(United States) K Sands (France) C Vanier	6	6
(Australia) A Minter (Australia) E Minter	1	2
(Sweden) C Jexell (United States) J Klitch	6	7	8
(United States) A Henricksson (United States) N Yeargin	7	5	10
(Czechoslovakia) I Budařová (Czechoslovakia) M Skuherská	0	5
11	(United States) L Allen (United States) A White	6	7
LL	(United States) K Kinney (South Africa) R Mentz	6	6
(United States) H Manset (United States) S Margolin	3	1
(United Kingdom) A Brown (United States) A-M Fernandez	2	2
(Puerto Rico) G Fernández (United States) A Moulton	6	6
(United States) P Barg (United States) A Holton	3	2
(Canada) C Bassett (Hungary) A Temesvári	6	6
(Socialist Federal Republic of Yugoslavia) S Goleš (Austria) P Huber	2	1
4	(United States) B Potter (United States) S Walsh	6	6

Second round
5	(South Africa) R Fairbank (United States) C Reynolds	6	6
LL	(United States) K Sands (France) C Vanier	3	2
(United States) A Henricksson (United States) N Yeargin	3	6	3
11	(United States) L Allen (United States) A White	6	3	6
LL	(United States) K Kinney (South Africa) R Mentz	0	2
(Puerto Rico) G Fernández (United States) A Moulton	6	6
(Canada) C Bassett (Hungary) A Temesvári	3	4
4	(United States) B Potter (United States) S Walsh	6	6

Third round
5	(South Africa) R Fairbank (United States) C Reynolds	6	6
11	(United States) L Allen (United States) A White	3	4
(Puerto Rico) G Fernández (United States) A Moulton	3	6	2
4	(United States) B Potter (United States) S Walsh	6	3	6

Quarterfinals
5	(South Africa) R Fairbank (United States) C Reynolds	6	6	4
4	(United States) B Potter (United States) S Walsh	3	7	6

==== Section 4 ====
First round
7	(United States) K Jordan (United States) A Smith	7	6
(Bulgaria) M Maleeva (Czechoslovakia) H Suková	5	3
(United States) T Holladay (United States) K Shaefer	4	7	2
(Italy) A-M Cecchini (Italy) S Simmonds	6	6	6
(West Germany) S Graf (United States) E Norton	6	1	6
Q	(Soviet Union) E Eliseenko (Soviet Union) N Reva	4	6	8
(United States) P Smith (United States) W White	7	7
14	(West Germany) B Bunge (West Germany) E Pfaff	6	5
9	(United States) A Leand (United States) M-L Piatek	6	6	6
(France) N Herreman (France) C Suire	7	3	4
(United States) R Blount (United States) J Wright	7	6
(Poland) I Kuczyńska (Australia) S Leo	6	1
(United Kingdom) R Einy (United States) S Rimes	1	0
(United States) S Collins (Brazil) P Medrado	6	6
(United States) E Herr (United States) P Teeguarden	2	2
2	(United Kingdom) A Hobbs (Australia) W Turnbull	6	6

Second round
7	(United States) K Jordan (United States) A Smith	6	6
(Italy) A-M Cecchini (Italy) S Simmonds	0	2
Q	(Soviet Union) E Eliseenko (Soviet Union) N Reva	2	5
(United States) P Smith (United States) W White	6	7
9	(United States) A Leand (United States) M-L Piatek	0	6
(United States) R Blount (United States) J Wright	6	7
(United States) S Collins (Brazil) P Medrado	7	6
2	(United Kingdom) A Hobbs (Australia) W Turnbull	6	4

Third round
7	(United States) K Jordan (United States) A Smith	6	6
(United States) P Smith (United States) W White	2	0
(United States) R Blount (United States) J Wright	6	3	9
(United States) S Collins (Brazil) P Medrado	3	6	7

Quarterfinals
7	(United States) K Jordan (United States) A Smith	6	6
(United States) R Blount (United States) J Wright	0	1
