= Robbie Weiss =

American tennis player (born 1966)

- Country (sports): United States
- Born: December 1, 1966 (age 59) Chicago, Illinois, United States
- Height: 6 ft 0 in (1.83 m)
- Turned pro: 1988
- Plays: Right-handed
- Prize money: $499,723

Singles
- Career record: 48–78
- Career titles: 1; 3 Challenger, 0 Futures
- Highest ranking: No. 85 (29 October 1990)

Grand Slam singles results
- Australian Open: 2R (1993)
- French Open: 1R (1993)
- Wimbledon: 1R (1993, 1994)
- US Open: 2R (1992, 1994)

Doubles
- Career record: 3–6
- Career titles: 0; 1 Challenger, 0 Futures
- Highest ranking: No. 271 (26 June 1989)
- Last updated on: 12 June 2022.

Robbie Weiss (born December 1, 1966) is a former tour professional tennis player and NCAA Division I singles champion. The resident of Las Vegas achieved a career-high ATP ranking in singles of world No. 85, which he reached on the heels of winning his only ATP Tour event, the 1990 São Paulo Grand Prix. He also won, partnering Ricky Brown, the 1984 Wimbledon Championships junior doubles title.

Weiss played just a few tournaments on the ITF Junior Circuit, and his only notable junior success was winning the Wimbledon doubles crown in '84 partnering Brown. They won the final over Jonas Svensson and Mark Kratzmann despite losing the first set 1–6. As a collegian, Weiss won the 1988 NCAA Division I singles title despite being ranked only No. 48 in that year's preseason rankings. He did win however three singles tournaments to raise his ranking to No. 1 entering the singles championship. In the title match, Weiss defeated UCLA's Brian Garrow 6–2, 4–6, 6–3 to become the first Pepperdine University player to win a singles title. Weiss was an All-American selection 1986 and again in 1988. In '86 the Waves lost the team championship finals to Stanford.

Turning pro shortly after winning the NCAA individual title, Weiss scored tour singles match wins over at the time World No. 19 Tim Mayotte and No. 31 Karel Nováček both on grass courts in 1990, over World No. 6 Ivan Lendl and No. 21 Henrik Holm on hard courts in 1993, World No. 14 Boris Becker on hard courts in 1994, and most impressively over World No. 2 Stefan Edberg on hard courts in 1992. He won a main draw round at the 1993 Australian Open, over World No. 64 Richey Reneberg, 6–2 in the fifth. In addition to his Grand Prix event triumph in São Paulo in 1990, when he beat Jaime Yzaga in the final despite dropping the first set, Weiss took three Challenger event titles - Itu-São Paulo in November 1992; Palm Springs in 1993; and Granby in 1995.

In doubles, Weiss reached a career-high ranking of World No. 271 in June 1989. He won one Challenger - 1989 Salou, partnering Conny Falk.

Weiss is Jewish, and resided during his junior days in Ponte Vedra Beach, Florida.

== ATP career finals ==
=== Singles: 1 (1 title) ===
Legend Grand Slam Tournaments (0–0) ATP World Tour Finals (0–0) ATP World Tour Masters Series (0–0) ATP Championship Series (0–0) ATP World Series (1–0)	Finals by surface Hard (0–0) Clay (0–0) Grass (0–0) Carpet (1–0)	Finals by setting Outdoors (1–0) Indoors (0–0)

Result	W–L	Date	Tournament	Tier	Surface	Opponent	Score
Win	1–0	Oct 1990	São Paulo, Brazil	Grand Prix	Carpet	(Peru) Jaime Yzaga	3–6, 7–6^{(9–7)}, 6–3

== ATP Challenger and ITF Futures finals ==
=== Singles: 7 (3–4) ===
Legend ATP Challenger (3–4) ITF Futures (0–0)	Finals by surface Hard (3–4) Clay (0–0) Grass (0–0) Carpet (0–0)

Result	W–L	Date	Tournament	Tier	Surface	Opponent	Score
Loss	0–1	Jul 1989	Aptos, United States	Challenger	Hard	(South Africa) Mark Kaplan	4–6, 4–6
Loss	0–2	Aug 1989	Seattle, United States	Challenger	Hard	(United States) MaliVai Washington	4–6, 3–6
Loss	0–3	Mar 1990	Martinique, Martinique	Challenger	Hard	(France) Guillaume Raoux	6–3, 3–6, 3–6
Win	1–3	May 1992	Itu, Brazil	Challenger	Hard	(The Bahamas) Roger Smith	3–6, 6–3, 6–4
Win	2–3	Feb 1993	Rancho Mirage, United States	Challenger	Hard	(South Africa) David Nainkin	6–1, 6–4
Loss	2–4	Aug 1993	Cincinnati, United States	Challenger	Hard	(United States) Doug Flach	6–7, 7–6, 4–6
Win	3–4	Jul 1995	Granby, Canada	Challenger	Hard	(Armenia) Sargis Sargsian	6–2, 6–2

=== Doubles: 1 (1–0) ===
Legend ATP Challenger (1–0) ITF Futures (0–0)	Finals by surface Hard (0–0) Clay (1–0) Grass (0–0) Carpet (0–0)

Result	W–L	Date	Tournament	Tier	Surface	Partner	Opponents	Score
Win	1–0	Jun 1989	Salou, Spain	Challenger	Clay	(Sweden) Conny Falk	(Sweden) Per Henricsson (Sweden) Nicklas Utgren	5–7, 7–6, 6–4

== Junior Grand Slam finals ==
=== Doubles: 1 (1 title) ===
Result	Year	Tournament	Surface	Partner	Opponents	Score
Win	1984	Wimbledon	Grass	(United States) Ricky Brown	(Australia) Mark Kratzmann (Sweden) Jonas Svensson	1–6, 6–4, 11–9

== Performance timelines ==
Key
W	F	SF	QF	#R	RR	Q#	DNQ	A	NH

(W) winner; (F) finalist; (SF) semifinalist; (QF) quarterfinalist; (#R) rounds 4, 3, 2, 1; (RR) round-robin stage; (Q#) qualification round; (DNQ) did not qualify; (A) absent; (NH) not held; (SR) strike rate (events won / competed); (W–L) win–loss record.

=== Singles ===
Tournament	1988	1989	1990	1991	1992	1993	1994	1995	SR	W–L	Win %
Grand Slam tournaments
Australian Open	A	Q1	A	1R	Q3	2R	1R	Q2	0 / 3	1–3	25%
French Open	A	A	A	A	A	1R	Q1	Q1	0 / 1	0–1	0%
Wimbledon	A	A	A	A	Q2	1R	1R	A	0 / 2	0–2	0%
US Open	1R	1R	A	A	2R	1R	2R	Q3	0 / 5	2–5	29%
Win–loss	0–1	0–1	0–0	0–1	1–1	1–4	1–3	0–0	0 / 11	3–11	21%
ATP Masters Series
Indian Wells	1R	A	A	A	A	1R	2R	A	0 / 3	1–3	25%
Miami	A	A	A	A	4R	1R	2R	Q3	0 / 3	4–3	57%
Canada	A	A	A	A	2R	A	1R	A	0 / 2	1–2	33%
Cincinnati	A	A	A	A	A	1R	A	A	0 / 1	0–1	0%
Win–loss	0–1	0–0	0–0	0–0	4–2	0–3	2–3	0–0	0 / 9	6–9	40%

== See also ==
- List of select Jewish tennis players
