= 1984 Wimbledon Championships – Men's doubles =

Men's doubles
- 1984 Wimbledon Championships

Final
- Champions: (United States) Peter Fleming (United States) John McEnroe
- Runners-up: (Australia) Pat Cash (Australia) Paul McNamee
- Score: 6–2, 5–7, 6–2, 3–6, 6–3

Details
- Draw: 64 (5 Q / 5 WC )
- Seeds: 16

Events
Singles	men	women		boys	girls
Doubles	men	women	mixed	boys	girls
WC Singles	men	women	quad
WC Doubles	men	women	quad
Legends	men	women	seniors
← 1983 ·	Wimbledon Championships	· 1985 →

Peter Fleming and John McEnroe successfully defended their title, defeating Pat Cash and Paul McNamee in the final, 6–2, 5–7, 6–2, 3–6, 6–3 to win the gentlemen's doubles title at the 1984 Wimbledon Championships. This was their fourth title. It earned McEnroe his third and last win of both the doubles and singles title in the same year

== Seeds ==
1. (United States) Peter Fleming / (United States) John McEnroe (champions)
2. (Australia) Mark Edmondson / (United States) Sherwood Stewart (quarterfinals)
3. (United States) Tim Gullikson / (United States) Tom Gullikson (quarterfinals)
4. (South Africa) Kevin Curren / (United States) Steve Denton (quarterfinals)
5. (Australia) Pat Cash / (Australia) Paul McNamee (final)
6. (Czechoslovakia) Pavel Složil / (Czechoslovakia) Tomáš Šmíd (third round)
7. (United States) Sandy Mayer / (United States) Ferdi Taygan (semifinals)
8. (Brazil) Carlos Kirmayr / (Brazil) Cássio Motta (first round)
9. (Sweden) Stefan Edberg / (Sweden) Anders Järryd (third round)
10. (Switzerland) Heinz Günthardt / (Hungary) Balázs Taróczy (third round)
11. (South Africa) Bernard Mitton / (United States) Butch Walts (first round)
12. (Australia) John Alexander / (Australia) John Fitzgerald (quarterfinals)
13. (United States) Tony Giammalva / (United States) Steve Meister (first round)
14. (Australia) Broderick Dyke / (Australia) Wally Masur (third round)
15. (United Kingdom) Colin Dowdeswell / (United States) Van Winitsky (first round)
16. (United States) Ken Flach / (United States) Robert Seguso (third round)

Click on the seed number of a player to go to their draw section.

== Draw ==
=== Key ===
- Q = Qualifier
- WC = Wild card
- LL = Lucky loser
- Alt = Alternate
- ITF = ITF entry
- PR = Protected ranking
- SR = Special ranking
- SE = Special exempt
- JE = Junior exempt
- JR = Junior Accelerator Programme entrant
- CO = College Accelerator Programme entrant
- NG = Next Gen Accelerator Program entrant
- w/o = Walkover
- r = Retired
- d = Defaulted

=== Finals ===
Quarterfinals
1	(United States) Peter Fleming (United States) John McEnroe	6	6	4	6
12	(Australia) John Alexander (Australia) John Fitzgerald	4	4	6	4
4	(South Africa) Kevin Curren (United States) Steve Denton	6	4	4
7	(United States) Sandy Mayer (United States) Ferdi Taygan	7	6	6
LL	(Australia) Peter Doohan (Australia) Michael Fancutt	0	6	3	6	6
3	(United States) Tim Gullikson (United States) Tom Gullikson	6	4	6	2	3
5	(Australia) Pat Cash (Australia) Paul McNamee	6	3	4	7	13
2	(Australia) Mark Edmondson (United States) Sherwood Stewart	3	6	6	5	11

Semifinals
1	(United States) Peter Fleming (United States) John McEnroe	7	7	6
7	(United States) Sandy Mayer (United States) Ferdi Taygan	6	6	4
LL	(Australia) Peter Doohan (Australia) Michael Fancutt	1	6	3	7	5
5	(Australia) Pat Cash (Australia) Paul McNamee	6	3	6	6	7

Final
1	(United States) Peter Fleming (United States) John McEnroe	6	5	6	3	6
5	(Australia) Pat Cash (Australia) Paul McNamee	2	7	2	6	3

=== Top half ===
==== Section 1 ====
First round
1	(United States) P Fleming (United States) J McEnroe	6	6	4	6
Q	(India) S Menon (Canada) G Michibata	3	3	6	3
(United States) D Gitlin (United States) C Hooper	4	6	3	6	11
(Chile) J Fillol (Paraguay) F González	6	3	6	3	9
(Australia) C Fancutt (Netherlands) M Schapers	3	7	7	6
(United States) V Amaya (United States) H Pfister	6	6	6	2
(United States) M Purcell (United States) V Van Patten	6	6	6
13	(United States) A Giammalva (United States) S Meister	1	4	4
12	(Australia) J Alexander (Australia) J Fitzgerald	7	6	6
WC	(United Kingdom) J Bates (United Kingdom) J Dier	6	4	4
(United States) B Cox (Switzerland) J Hlasek	7	6	4	6
Q	(United States) M Doyle (West Germany) A Maurer	6	4	6	4
(South Africa) E Edwards (South Africa) D Visser	6	6	6
(Australia) D Graham (Australia) L Warder	3	4	2
(West Germany) B Becker (Poland) W Fibak	6	6	4	1	4
6	(Czechoslovakia) P Složil (Czechoslovakia) T Šmíd	3	3	6	6	6

Second round
1	(United States) P Fleming (United States) J McEnroe	6	6	7
(United States) D Gitlin (United States) C Hooper	4	4	6
(Australia) C Fancutt (Netherlands) M Schapers	6	4	6
(United States) M Purcell (United States) V Van Patten	7	6	7
12	(Australia) J Alexander (Australia) J Fitzgerald	7	6	7
(United States) B Cox (Switzerland) J Hlasek	6	4	6
(South Africa) E Edwards (South Africa) D Visser	4	2	6
6	(Czechoslovakia) P Složil (Czechoslovakia) T Šmíd	6	6	7

Third round
1	(United States) P Fleming (United States) J McEnroe	7	6	7
(United States) M Purcell (United States) V Van Patten	6	1	5
12	(Australia) J Alexander (Australia) J Fitzgerald	7	3	7	6
6	(Czechoslovakia) P Složil (Czechoslovakia) T Šmíd	6	6	6	4

Quarterfinals
1	(United States) P Fleming (United States) J McEnroe	6	6	4	6
12	(Australia) J Alexander (Australia) J Fitzgerald	4	4	6	4

==== Section 2 ====
First round
4	(South Africa) K Curren (United States) S Denton	7	6	7
(United States) G Donnelly (United States) C Wittus	6	3	6
(United States) M Davis (United States) C Dunk	1	2	4
(Sweden) J Nyström (Sweden) M Wilander	6	6	6
WC	(United Kingdom) S Bale (United Kingdom) R Lewis	6	6	6	7
LL	(United States) R Nelson (Japan) H Shirato	7	3	3	6
WC	(Australia) M Kratzmann (Australia) S Youl	4	2	3
9	(Sweden) S Edberg (Sweden) A Järryd	6	6	6
15	(United Kingdom) C Dowdeswell (United States) V Winitsky	6	4	6	3
(United States) T Delatte (United States) J Kriek	2	6	7	6
(United States) B Gottfried (United States) M Leach	2	6	4
(United States) L Stefanki (United States) R Van't Hof	6	7	6
LL	(Israel) A Mansdorf (Israel) S Perkiss	2	3	3
(United Kingdom) J Lloyd (United States) R Stockton	6	6	6
Q	(United States) T Cain (United States) P McEnroe	3	6	1	2
7	(United States) A Mayer (United States) F Taygan	6	3	6	6

Second round
4	(South Africa) K Curren (United States) S Denton	6	6	4	6	6
(Sweden) J Nyström (Sweden) M Wilander	1	4	6	7	3
WC	(United Kingdom) S Bale (United Kingdom) R Lewis	4	2	4
9	(Sweden) S Edberg (Sweden) A Järryd	6	6	6
(United States) T Delatte (United States) J Kriek	6	7	7
(United States) L Stefanki (United States) R Van't Hof	3	5	5
(United Kingdom) J Lloyd (United States) R Stockton	6	6	5	3	2
7	(United States) A Mayer (United States) F Taygan	3	3	7	6	6

Third round
4	(South Africa) K Curren (United States) S Denton	6	6	7	6
9	(Sweden) S Edberg (Sweden) A Järryd	3	7	6	4
(United States) T Delatte (United States) J Kriek	6	6	7	5
7	(United States) A Mayer (United States) F Taygan	7	7	5	7

Quarterfinals
4	(South Africa) K Curren (United States) S Denton	6	4	4
7	(United States) A Mayer (United States) F Taygan	7	6	6

=== Bottom half ===
==== Section 3 ====
First round
8	(Brazil) C Kirmayr (Brazil) C Motta	3	4	2
LL	(United States) P Annacone (United States) M De Palmer	6	6	6
LL	(Australia) P Doohan (Australia) C Fancutt	6	7	6	6
WC	(United Kingdom) J Feaver (United Kingdom) J Smith	4	6	7	4
(Australia) B Drewett (Australia) K Warwick	7	6	5	7	6
(United States) S McCain (United States) B Willenborg	5	7	7	6	3
(India) A Amritraj (India) V Amritraj	4	0	2
14	(Australia) B Dyke (Australia) W Masur	6	6	6
11	(South Africa) B Mitton (United States) K Walts	5	4	4
(New Zealand) C Lewis (United States) T Wilkison	7	6	6
Q	(United States) A Kohlberg (United States) R Meyer	6	6	7
(Brazil) A Hocevar (Brazil) M Hocevar	4	4	5
(United States) C Strode (United States) J Turpin	5	3	4
(United States) S Davis (United States) B Teacher	7	6	6
(Peru) P Arraya (Ecuador) A Gómez	5	4	6	4
3	(United States) Ti Gullikson (United States) To Gullikson	7	6	3	6

Second round
LL	(United States) P Annacone (United States) M De Palmer	4	4	4
LL	(Australia) P Doohan (Australia) C Fancutt	6	6	6
(Australia) B Drewett (Australia) K Warwick	4	6	3	6
14	(Australia) B Dyke (Australia) W Masur	6	1	6	7
(New Zealand) C Lewis (United States) T Wilkison	7	6	6	6
Q	(United States) A Kohlberg (United States) R Meyer	6	7	4	4
(United States) S Davis (United States) B Teacher	6	6	6
3	(United States) Ti Gullikson (United States) To Gullikson	7	7	7

Third round
LL	(Australia) P Doohan (Australia) C Fancutt	7	6	7
14	(Australia) B Dyke (Australia) W Masur	5	4	6
(New Zealand) C Lewis (United States) T Wilkison	6	6	4	4
3	(United States) Ti Gullikson (United States) To Gullikson	2	7	6	6

Quarterfinals
LL	(Australia) P Doohan (Australia) C Fancutt	0	6	3	6	6
3	(United States) Ti Gullikson (United States) To Gullikson	6	4	6	2	3

==== Section 4 ====
First round
5	(Australia) P Cash (Australia) P McNamee	6	6	7	6
(United States) A Andrews (United States) J Sadri	7	3	6	3
(Sweden) S Simonsson (Sweden) H Sundström	6	6	2	6	6
(United States) J Canter (South Africa) D Tarr	4	7	6	4	4
(Australia) C Miller (United States) M Mitchell	6	7	6
(Switzerland) M Günthardt (Hungary) Z Kuhárszky	3	6	2
(Sweden) J Gunnarsson (Denmark) M Mortensen	4	7	5	6
16	(United States) K Flach (United States) R Seguso	6	6	7	7
10	(Switzerland) H Günthardt (Hungary) B Taróczy	6	6	6	7
(Italy) C Panatta (United States) N Saviano	4	7	2	5
WC	(United Kingdom) C Bradnam (United Kingdom) S Shaw	7	3	7	6
(Italy) S Colombo (Italy) G Ocleppo	6	6	6	4
(United States) L Bourne (United States) M Dickson	4	7	6	7
(Brazil) G Barbosa (Brazil) J Soares	6	6	1	6
Q	(New Zealand) D Mustard (New Zealand) R Simpson	7	4	7	2	4
2	(Australia) M Edmondson (United States) S Stewart	6	6	5	6	6

Second round
5	(Australia) P Cash (Australia) P McNamee	4	6	6	6	6
(Sweden) S Simonsson (Sweden) H Sundström	6	3	7	3	4
(Australia) C Miller (United States) M Mitchell	6	6	2	2
16	(United States) K Flach (United States) R Seguso	3	7	6	6
10	(Switzerland) H Günthardt (Hungary) B Taróczy	6	4	6	7
WC	(United Kingdom) C Bradnam (United Kingdom) S Shaw	4	6	4	6
(United States) L Bourne (United States) M Dickson	5	2	2
2	(Australia) M Edmondson (United States) S Stewart	7	6	6

Third round
5	(Australia) P Cash (Australia) P McNamee	6	6	6	6	7
16	(United States) K Flach (United States) R Seguso	7	7	4	4	5
10	(Switzerland) H Günthardt (Hungary) B Taróczy	6	6	6	3	3
2	(Australia) M Edmondson (United States) S Stewart	4	7	3	6	6

Quarterfinals
5	(Australia) P Cash (Australia) P McNamee	6	3	4	7	13
2	(Australia) M Edmondson (United States) S Stewart	3	6	6	5	11
