= Richard Whichello =

British tennis player

- Country (sports): United Kingdom
- Born: 27 May 1967 (age 59) Orpington, Kent, England
- Plays: Left-handed
- Prize money: $9,137

Singles
- Career record: 0–2
- Career titles: 0
- Highest ranking: No. 286 (28 November 1988)

Grand Slam singles results
- Wimbledon: 1R (1988)

Doubles
- Career record: 0–1
- Career titles: 0
- Highest ranking: No. 284 (14 November 1988)

Grand Slam doubles results
- Wimbledon: 1R (1986)

Richard Whichello (born 27 May 1967) is a former British tennis player.

== Career ==
At the 1988 Wimbledon Championships, Whichello was given a wild card entry into the main draw and faced German Tore Meinecke in the first round. He lost the match in four sets. Soon after, Whichello was one of three young British players called up for a 1988 Davis Cup tie against Austria in Zell am See. He played in the fifth match against Thomas Muster and was beaten in straight sets, as Austria secured a 5–0 win. His good year continued when he partnered David Ison to win the doubles title at an ATP Challenger tournament in Knokke, Belgium. In December, while training in the United States, Whichello suffered a prolapsed disc in his back, an injury that would sideline him for seven months.

== Challenger titles ==
=== Doubles: (1) ===
No.	Year	Tournament	Surface	Partner	Opponents	Score
1.	1988	Knokke, Belgium	Clay	(United Kingdom) David Ison	(Australia) Kurt Robinson (Australia) Justin Stead	6–4, 6–3

== See also ==
- List of Great Britain Davis Cup team representatives
