= 1984 Wimbledon Championships =

- Date: 25 June – 8 July
- Edition: 98th
- Category: Grand Slam
- Draw: 128S/64D/64XD
- Prize money: £1,461,896
- Surface: Grass
- Location: Church Road; SW19, Wimbledon, London, United Kingdom
- Venue: All England Lawn Tennis and Croquet Club

Champions

Men's singles
- (United States) John McEnroe

Women's singles
- (United States) Martina Navratilova

Men's doubles
- (United States) Peter Fleming / (United States) John McEnroe

Women's doubles
- (United States) Martina Navratilova / (United States) Pam Shriver

Mixed doubles
- (United Kingdom) John Lloyd / (Australia) Wendy Turnbull

Boys' singles
- (Australia) Mark Kratzmann

Girls' singles
- (United Kingdom) Annabel Croft

Boys' doubles
- (United States) Ricky Brown / (United States) Robbie Weiss

Girls' doubles
- (United States) Caroline Kuhlman / (United States) Stephanie Rehe
← 1983 ·	Wimbledon Championships	· 1985 →

The 1984 Wimbledon Championships was a tennis tournament played on grass courts at the All England Lawn Tennis and Croquet Club in Wimbledon, London in the United Kingdom. It was the 98th edition of the Wimbledon Championships and were held from 25 June to 8 July 1984.

To celebrate the centenary of the Ladies' Singles competition, first held in 1884, 17 of the surviving 20 singles champions were presented with an engraved crystal vase on Centre Court by Prince Edward, Duke of Kent and Katharine, Duchess of Kent on Monday, 2 July. Those presented were Martina Navratilova, Virginia Wade, Chris Evert Lloyd, Evonne Goolagong Cawley, Ann Jones, Billie Jean King, Margaret Court, Angela Mortimer, Maria Bueno, Althea Gibson, Shirley Fry, Doris Hart, Louise Brough, Margaret duPont, Pauline Betz, Alice Marble and Kitty Godfree. Karen Susman, Helen Jacobs and Helen Wills did not attend, but were all presented with their crystal individually during the 1984 Olympics in Los Angeles by Mrs Godfree, when she attended the games with members of the All England Club committee.

== Prize money ==
The total prize money for 1984 championships was £1,461,896. The winner of the men's title earned £100,000 while the women's singles champion earned £90,000.

Event	W	F	SF	QF	Round of 16	Round of 32	Round of 64	Round of 128
Men's singles	£100,000	£50,000	£25,000	£12,500	£6,850	£3,850	£2,200	£1,300
Women's singles	£90,000	£45,000	£21,900	£10,704	£5,866	£3,080	£1,796	£1,027
Men's doubles *	£40,000	£20,000	£10,000	£4,000	£2,000	£1,000	£584	—
Women's doubles *	£34,700	£17,350	£8,000	£3,200	£1,460	£480	£240	—
Mixed doubles *	£18,000	£9,000	£4,500	£2,100	£1,050	£526	£226	—

_{* per team}

== Champions ==
=== Seniors ===
In all five senior disciplines, the 1983 champions successfully defended their titles.

==== Men's singles ====
(United States) John McEnroe defeated (United States) Jimmy Connors, 6–1, 6–1, 6–2

- It was McEnroe's 6th career Grand Slam singles title and his third Wimbledon singles title.

==== Women's singles ====
(United States) Martina Navratilova defeated (United States) Chris Evert Lloyd, 7–6^{(7–5)}, 6–2

- It was Navratilova's 26th career Grand Slam title and her 5th Wimbledon singles title.

==== Men's doubles ====
(United States) Peter Fleming / (United States) John McEnroe defeated (Australia) Pat Cash / (Australia) Paul McNamee, 6–2, 5–7, 6–2, 3–6, 6–3

- It was Fleming's 7th career Grand Slam title and his fourth and last Wimbledon title. It was McEnroe's 14th career Grand Slam title and his 7th Wimbledon singles or doubles title.

==== Women's doubles ====
(United States) Martina Navratilova / (United States) Pam Shriver defeated (United States) Kathy Jordan / (United States) Anne Smith, 6–3, 6–4

- It was Navratilova's 27th career Grand Slam title and her 11th Wimbledon title. It was Shriver's 8th career Grand Slam title and her 4th Wimbledon title.

==== Mixed doubles ====
(United Kingdom) John Lloyd / (Australia) Wendy Turnbull defeated (United States) Steve Denton / (United States) Kathy Jordan, 6–3, 6–3

- It was Lloyd's 3rd and last career Grand Slam title and his 2nd Wimbledon title. It was Turnbull's 9th and last career Grand Slam title and her 3rd Wimbledon title.

=== Juniors ===
==== Boys' singles ====
(Australia) Mark Kratzmann defeated (South Africa) Stefan Kruger, 6–4, 4–6, 6–3

==== Girls' singles ====
(United Kingdom) Annabel Croft defeated (South Africa) Elna Reinach, 3–6, 6–3, 6–2

==== Boys' doubles ====
(United States) Ricky Brown / (United States) Robbie Weiss defeated (Australia) Mark Kratzmann / (Sweden) Jonas Svensson, 1–6, 6–4, 11–9

==== Girls' doubles ====
(United States) Caroline Kuhlman / (United States) Stephanie Rehe defeated (Soviet Union) Viktoria Milvidskaia / (Soviet Union) Larisa Savchenko, 6–3, 5–7, 6–4

== Singles seeds ==
=== Men's singles ===
1. (United States) John McEnroe (champion)
2. (Czechoslovakia) Ivan Lendl (semifinals, lost to Jimmy Connors)
3. (United States) Jimmy Connors (final, lost to John McEnroe)
4. (Sweden) Mats Wilander (second round, lost to Pat Cash)
5. (United States) Jimmy Arias (fourth round, lost to Tomáš Šmíd)
6. (Ecuador) Andrés Gómez (quarterfinals, lost to Pat Cash)
7. (France) Yannick Noah (withdrew before the tournament began)
8. (Argentina) José Luis Clerc (withdrew before the tournament began)
9. (Sweden) Henrik Sundström (second round, lost to Mark Edmondson)
10. (Sweden) Anders Järryd (first round, lost to Scott Davis)
11. (South Africa) Kevin Curren (fourth round, lost to Pat Cash)
12. (United States) Johan Kriek (fourth round, lost to Paul Annacone)
13. (Czechoslovakia) Tomáš Šmíd (quarterfinals, lost to Ivan Lendl)
14. (United States) Bill Scanlon (fourth round, lost to John McEnroe)
15. (United States) Vitas Gerulaitis (fourth round, lost to John Sadri)
16. (United States) Tim Mayotte (fourth round, lost to Jimmy Connors)

=== Women's singles ===
1. (United States) Martina Navratilova (champion)
2. (United States) Chris Evert Lloyd (final, lost to Martina Navratilova)
3. (Czechoslovakia) Hana Mandlíková (semifinals, lost to Chris Evert Lloyd)
4. (United States) Pam Shriver (quarterfinals, lost to Kathy Jordan)
5. (United States) Zina Garrison (second round, lost to Virginia Wade)
6. (United States) Kathy Jordan (semifinals, lost to Martina Navratilova)
7. (Bulgaria) Manuela Maleeva (quarterfinals, lost to Martina Navratilova)
8. (United States) Kathy Horvath (second round, lost to Bettina Bunge)
9. (Australia) Wendy Turnbull (fourth round, lost to Kathy Jordan)
10. (United Kingdom) Jo Durie (quarterfinals, lost to Hana Mandlíková)
11. (United States) Lisa Bonder (third round, lost to Elizabeth Sayers)
12. (West Germany) Claudia Kohde-Kilsch (fourth round, lost to Chris Evert Lloyd)
13. (United States) Barbara Potter (fourth round, lost to Pam Shriver)
14. (Czechoslovakia) Helena Suková (fourth round, lost to Hana Mandlíková)
15. (Hungary) Andrea Temesvári (fourth round, lost to Carina Karlsson)
16. (Canada) Carling Bassett (third round, lost to Anne Hobbs)

Preceded by 1984 French Open	Grand Slams	Succeeded by 1984 US Open
