= 1985 Wimbledon Championships – Men's singles qualifying =

Men's singles qualifying
- 1985 Wimbledon Championships

Events
Singles	men	women		boys	girls
Doubles	men	women	mixed	boys	girls
WC Singles	men	women	quad
WC Doubles	men	women	quad
Legends	men	women	seniors

Qualification
Singles	men	women
Doubles	men	women	mixed
- Wimbledon Championships

Players and pairs who neither have high enough rankings nor receive wild cards may participate in a qualifying tournament held one week before the annual Wimbledon Tennis Championships.

== Seeds ==
1. (West Germany) Andreas Maurer (qualified)
2. (Brazil) Marcos Hocevar (qualifying competition)
3. (Israel) Amos Mansdorf (qualifying competition)
4. (Haiti) Ronald Agénor (qualifying competition)
5. (Switzerland) Claudio Mezzadri (second round)
6. (Argentina) Roberto Saad (qualified)
7. (Australia) Simon Youl (second round)
8. (Chile) Ricardo Acuña (qualified)
9. (South Africa) Christo van Rensburg (qualifying competition)
10. (New Zealand) Kelly Evernden (qualified)
11. (United States) David Dowlen (qualifying competition)
12. (United States) Matt Anger (qualified)
13. (Brazil) Fernando Roese (first round)
14. (Brazil) João Soares (first round)
15. (United States) Robert Van't Hof (qualified)
16. (Australia) Broderick Dyke (first round)
17. (Canada) Glenn Michibata (qualifying competition)
18. (United States) Andy Kohlberg (qualifying competition)
19. (South Africa) Christo Steyn (qualified)
20. (United States) Jeff Turpin (second round)
21. (United States) Andy Andrews (first round)
22. (Australia) Darren Cahill (second round)
23. (United States) Bruce Manson (first round)
24. (United States) Eric Korita (first round)
25. (United States) Marcel Freeman (qualifying competition)
26. (Australia) Craig A. Miller (qualified)
27. (Mexico) Leonardo Lavalle (first round)
28. (South Africa) Kevin Moir (qualifying competition)
29. (Finland) Leo Palin (second round)
30. (United States) Robert Seguso (qualified)
31. (Spain) Juan Antonio Rodríguez (second round)
32. (Spain) José Clavet (second round)

== Qualifiers ==
1. (West Germany) Andreas Maurer
2. (United States) Tony Giammalva
3. (South Africa) Barry Moir
4. (South Africa) Christo Steyn
5. (South Africa) Gary Muller
6. (Argentina) Roberto Saad
7. (United States) Chris Dunk
8. (Chile) Ricardo Acuña
9. (Australia) Craig A. Miller
10. (New Zealand) Kelly Evernden
11. (United States) Robert Seguso
12. (United States) Matt Anger
13. (New Zealand) David Mustard
14. (United States) Bud Cox
15. (United States) Robert Van't Hof
16. (France) Thierry Champion

== Qualifying draw ==
=== First qualifier ===
First round
1	(West Germany) Andreas Maurer	7	6
(South Africa) Grant Saacks	6	1
(United States) Tomm Warneke	6	4
(India) Sashi Menon	7	6
(France) Éric Winogradsky	4	5
(South Africa) Stefan Kruger	6	7
(United Kingdom) Jonathan Smith	3	0
31	(Spain) Juan Antonio Rodríguez	6	6

Second round
1	(West Germany) Andreas Maurer	6	6
(India) Sashi Menon	3	2
(South Africa) Stefan Kruger	6	7
31	(Spain) Juan Antonio Rodríguez	2	6

Qualifying competition
1	(West Germany) Andreas Maurer	6	6	3	7
(South Africa) Stefan Kruger	3	4	6	5

=== Second qualifier ===
First round
2	(Brazil) Marcos Hocevar	7	6
(United Kingdom) Mike Walker	6	3
(United Kingdom) Austen Brice	6	6	7
(South Africa) Andrew Burrow	7	1	5
(South Africa) Neil Broad	4	6
(United States) Tony Giammalva	6	7
(Canada) Laird Dunlop	4	4
22	(Australia) Darren Cahill	6	6

Second round
2	(Brazil) Marcos Hocevar	6	6
(United Kingdom) Austen Brice	2	1
(United States) Tony Giammalva	6	6
22	(Australia) Darren Cahill	2	4

Qualifying competition
2	(Brazil) Marcos Hocevar	7	3	2	6
(United States) Tony Giammalva	5	6	6	7

=== Third qualifier ===
First round
3	(Israel) Amos Mansdorf	6	7
(Australia) Brett Custer	4	6
(United States) Gary Donnelly	6	6
(United Kingdom) Nigel Sears	2	3
(United Kingdom) James Turner	6	7	7
(Japan) Minoru Ueda	7	6	5
(South Africa) Barry Moir	3	7	6
23	(United States) Bruce Manson	6	5	3

Second round
3	(Israel) Amos Mansdorf	2	6	6
(United States) Gary Donnelly	6	3	10
(United Kingdom) James Turner	4	4
(South Africa) Barry Moir	6	6

Qualifying competition
3	(Israel) Amos Mansdorf	6	1	6	4
(South Africa) Barry Moir	3	6	7	6

=== Fourth qualifier ===
First round
4	(Haiti) Ronald Agénor	5	6	6
(Brazil) Alexandre Hocevar	7	3	3
(United Kingdom) Peter Russell	4	3
(United Kingdom) Martin Robinson	6	6
(Australia) Dale Houston	7	6
(Australia) Steve Wood	6	3
(Brazil) Carlos Kirmayr	7	4	3
19	(South Africa) Christo Steyn	6	6	6

Second round
4	(Haiti) Ronald Agénor	7	6
(United Kingdom) Martin Robinson	6	4
(Australia) Dale Houston	4	4
19	(South Africa) Christo Steyn	6	6

Qualifying competition
4	(Haiti) Ronald Agénor	4	2	7	4
19	(South Africa) Christo Steyn	6	6	6	6

=== Fifth qualifier ===
First round
5	(Switzerland) Claudio Mezzadri	7	4	6
(United Kingdom) Stephen Botfield	6	6	1
(South Africa) Marius Masencamp	4	6
(South Africa) Gary Muller	6	7
(United States) Chuck Nunn	7	6
(Italy) Patrizio Parrini	5	4
(France) Arnaud Boetsch	4	2
17	(Canada) Glenn Michibata	6	6

Second round
5	(Switzerland) Claudio Mezzadri	1	3
(South Africa) Gary Muller	6	6
(United States) Chuck Nunn	2	2
17	(Canada) Glenn Michibata	6	6

Qualifying competition
(South Africa) Gary Muller	6	7	6
17	(Canada) Glenn Michibata	4	6	1

=== Sixth qualifier ===
First round
6	(Argentina) Roberto Saad	6	6
(United States) Bruce Kleege	4	3
(United Kingdom) Howard McGuinness	2	6	4
(United States) Jeff Jones	6	4	6
(United States) Joe Leytze	6	6
(United States) Jacques Manset	7	7
(United Kingdom) John Feaver	6	1	6
1	(Mexico) Leonardo Lavalle	4	6	1

Second round
6	(Argentina) Roberto Saad	4	6	7
(United States) Jeff Jones	6	3	5
(United States) Jacques Manset	6	6	6
(United Kingdom) John Feaver	3	7	3

Qualifying competition
6	(Argentina) Roberto Saad	7	6	7
(United States) Jacques Manset	6	4	6

=== Seventh qualifier ===
First round
7	(Australia) Simon Youl	6	6
(Nigeria) Sadiq Abdullahi	2	1
(South Africa) Byron Talbot	1	4
(United States) Chris Dunk	6	6
(South Africa) Kwassie van der Merwe	6	4
(South Africa) Delayne Howell	7	6
(Australia) Patrick Flynn	4	7	8
24	(United States) Eric Korita	6	6	6

Second round
7	(Australia) Simon Youl	1	6	3
(United States) Chris Dunk	6	4	6
(South Africa) Delayne Howell	6	3	6
(Australia) Patrick Flynn	3	6	3

Qualifying competition
(United States) Chris Dunk	6	7	7
(South Africa) Delayne Howell	2	5	5

=== Eighth qualifier ===
First round
8	(Chile) Ricardo Acuña	6	7	6
(Australia) Mike Baroch	7	6	3
(France) François Errard	6	4
(United States) Cary Stansbury	7	6
(United States) Derrick Rostagno	6	3
(United States) Drew Gitlin	7	6
(United States) Charles Strode	4	4
25	(United States) Marcel Freeman	6	6

Second round
8	(Chile) Ricardo Acuña	6	6
(United States) Cary Stansbury	3	4
(United States) Drew Gitlin	6	1	5
25	(United States) Marcel Freeman	1	6	7

Qualifying competition
8	(Chile) Ricardo Acuña	6	6	7
25	(United States) Marcel Freeman	4	4	6

=== Ninth qualifier ===
First round
9	(South Africa) Christo van Rensburg	7	4	6
(United Kingdom) Richard Whichello	6	6	1
(South Africa) Trevor Raal	6	6
(India) Ranjit Mani	0	0
(Netherlands) Marc van Eekeren	3	3
(Italy) Paolo Canè	6	6
(South Africa) Charles Honey	6	7	7
26	(Australia) Craig A. Miller	7	5	9

Second round
9	(South Africa) Christo van Rensburg	6	6
(South Africa) Trevor Raal	1	2
(Italy) Paolo Canè	6	4	3
26	(Australia) Craig A. Miller	2	6	6

Qualifying competition
9	(South Africa) Christo van Rensburg	6	5	4
26	(Australia) Craig A. Miller	7	7	6

=== Tenth qualifier ===
First round
10	(New Zealand) Kelly Evernden	6	6
(Denmark) Morten Christensen	2	1
(Australia) Mark Kratzmann	6	6
(South Africa) Brian Levine	2	0
(United Kingdom) Patrick Hughesman	6	7	3
(United States) Tracy Delatte	7	6	6
(United States) John Sevely	6	5	7
28	(South Africa) Kevin Moir	3	7	9

Second round
10	(New Zealand) Kelly Evernden	6	7
(Australia) Mark Kratzmann	2	6
(United States) Tracy Delatte	4	3
28	(South Africa) Kevin Moir	6	6

Qualifying competition
10	(New Zealand) Kelly Evernden	6	7	6
28	(South Africa) Kevin Moir	3	6	1

=== Eleventh qualifier ===
First round
11	(United States) David Dowlen	6	6
(United States) Erik Van't Hof	4	4
(United States) Brad Cherry	7	7
(United Kingdom) Benjamin Knapp	6	6
(United Kingdom) Chris Kermode	2	2
(India) Anand Amritraj	6	6
(United States) Doug Stone	6	4
30	(United States) Robert Seguso	7	6

Second round
11	(United States) David Dowlen	3	7	6
(United States) Brad Cherry	6	6	2
(India) Anand Amritraj	6	6
30	(United States) Robert Seguso	7	7

Qualifying competition
11	(United States) David Dowlen	3	4	7	3
30	(United States) Robert Seguso	6	6	6	6

=== Twelfth qualifier ===
First round
12	(United States) Matt Anger	6	6
(United Kingdom) Chris Emery	3	4
(United States) Jim Pugh	6	1
(South Africa) Michael Robertson	7	6
(United States) Mark Groetsch	6	6
(Switzerland) Stephan Medem	3	3
(Switzerland) Marc Krippendorf	6	4	2
32	(Spain) José Clavet	2	6	6

Second round
12	(United States) Matt Anger	6	6
(South Africa) Michael Robertson	2	4
(United States) Mark Groetsch	3	6	6
32	(Spain) José Clavet	6	3	4

Qualifying competition
12	(United States) Matt Anger	6	6	6
(United States) Mark Groetsch	2	4	4

=== Thirteenth qualifier ===
First round
13	(Brazil) Fernando Roese	5	3
(United Kingdom) John Whiteford	7	6
(United Kingdom) Paul Reekie	4	6	6
(South Africa) Dean Johnson	6	3	2
(United States) Gary Niebur	0	0
(New Zealand) David Mustard	6	6
(United Kingdom) David Felgate	6	6
21	(United States) Andy Andrews	3	4

Second round
(United Kingdom) John Whiteford	7	7
(United Kingdom) Paul Reekie	6	6
(New Zealand) David Mustard	6	6
(United Kingdom) David Felgate	2	3

Qualifying competition
(United Kingdom) John Whiteford	6	2	3
(New Zealand) David Mustard	7	6	6

=== Fourteenth qualifier ===
First round
14	(Brazil) João Soares	4	4
(United States) Kelvin Belcher	6	6
Alt	(United Kingdom) Tim Davies	1	1
(United States) Bud Cox	6	6
(Denmark) Michael Mortensen	3	0^{r}
(South Africa) Denys Maasdorp	6	0
(United Kingdom) Robin Scott	6	3	1
18	(United States) Andy Kohlberg	3	6	6

Second round
(United States) Kelvin Belcher	6	6	3
(United States) Bud Cox	7	3	6
(South Africa) Denys Maasdorp	2	4
18	(United States) Andy Kohlberg	6	6

Qualifying competition
(United States) Bud Cox	6	4	7	6
18	(United States) Andy Kohlberg	1	6	6	3

=== Fifteenth qualifier ===
First round
15	(United States) Robert Van't Hof	6	6
(United States) Jim Grabb	4	4
(Mexico) Agustín Moreno	3	2
(Australia) Laurie Warder	6	6
(Brazil) Luiz Mattar	7	4	6
(Switzerland) Dominik Utzinger	6	6	3
(United States) Richard Meyer	4	6
20	(United States) Jeff Turpin	6	7

Second round
15	(United States) Robert Van't Hof	6	6
(Australia) Laurie Warder	2	4
(Brazil) Luiz Mattar	6	7	6
20	(United States) Jeff Turpin	7	5	2

Qualifying competition
15	(United States) Robert Van't Hof	6	6	6
(Brazil) Luiz Mattar	2	0	4

=== Sixteenth qualifier ===
First round
16	(Australia) Broderick Dyke	2	6	3
(United States) Tom Cain	6	1	6
(France) Thierry Champion	4	7	6
(United Kingdom) Mark Blincow	6	5	3
(United States) Richard Akel	6	5	2
(Puerto Rico) Ernie Fernández	3	7	6
(Australia) Kim Warwick	5	5
29	(Finland) Leo Palin	7	7

Second round
(United States) Tom Cain	4	4
(France) Thierry Champion	6	6
(Puerto Rico) Ernie Fernández	6	7
29	(Finland) Leo Palin	3	6

Qualifying competition
(France) Thierry Champion	6	7	4	4	6
(Puerto Rico) Ernie Fernández	1	6	6	6	3
