= 1985 Wimbledon Championships – Women's singles qualifying =

Women's singles qualifying
- 1985 Wimbledon Championships

Events
Singles	men	women		boys	girls
Doubles	men	women	mixed	boys	girls
WC Singles	men	women	quad
WC Doubles	men	women	quad
Legends	men	women	seniors

Qualification
Singles	men	women
Doubles	men	women	mixed
- Wimbledon Championships

Players and pairs who neither have high enough rankings nor receive wild cards may participate in a qualifying tournament held one week before the annual Wimbledon Tennis Championships.

== Seeds ==
1. (France) Marie-Christine Calleja (second round)
2. (United States) Kim Sands (second round)
3. (France) Nathalie Tauziat (second round)
4. (Czechoslovakia) Lea Plchová (qualifying competition, lucky loser)
5. (France) Nathalie Herreman (second round)
6. (United States) Kris Kinney (qualifying competition, lucky loser)
7. (South Africa) Jennifer Mundel (second round)
8. (United States) Kim Steinmetz (first round)
9. (United States) Maeve Quinlan (first round)
10. (West Germany) Andrea Betzner (qualified)
11. (Hungary) Csilla Bartos (second round, retired)
12. (United States) Patty Fendick (qualified)
13. (United States) Linda Howell (qualifying competition)
14. (United States) Jamie Golder (second round)
15. (United States) Hu Na (qualified)
16. (United States) Barbara Jordan (qualified)

== Qualifiers ==
1. (United States) Barbara Jordan
2. (United States) Molly Van Nostrand
3. (South Africa) Elna Reinach
4. (Australia) Jenny Byrne
5. (United States) Patty Fendick
6. (United States) Hu Na
7. (West Germany) Andrea Betzner
8. (Sweden) Elisabeth Ekblom

== Lucky losers ==
1. (Czechoslovakia) Lea Plchová
2. (United States) Kris Kinney

== Qualifying draw ==
=== First qualifier ===
First round
1	(France) Marie-Christine Calleja	6	6
(United States) Clare Evert	1	2
(United Kingdom) Suzi Mair	7	6
(Australia) Brenda Remilton	5	4
(Italy) Sabina Simmonds	6	6
(United States) Barbie Bramblett	3	0
(France) Emmanuelle Derly	1	1
16	(United States) Barbara Jordan	6	6

Second round
1	(France) Marie-Christine Calleja	3	2
(United Kingdom) Suzi Mair	6	6
(Italy) Sabina Simmonds	6	6^{7}	3
16	(United States) Barbara Jordan	2	7^{9}	6

Qualifying competition
(United Kingdom) Suzi Mair	4	2
16	(United States) Barbara Jordan	6	6

=== Second qualifier ===
First round
14	(United States) Jamie Golder	6	5	6
(Japan) Kumiko Okamoto	3	7	3
(New Zealand) Belinda Cordwell	5	7	13
(Canada) Jill Hetherington	7	5	11
(Australia) Annette Gulley	1	2
(United States) Molly Van Nostrand	6	6
(United States) Susan Rimes	3	3
5	(France) Nathalie Herreman	6	6

Second round
14	(United States) Jamie Golder	2	0
(New Zealand) Belinda Cordwell	6	6
(United States) Molly Van Nostrand	7	6
5	(France) Nathalie Herreman	6	3

Qualifying competition
(New Zealand) Belinda Cordwell	1	0
(United States) Molly Van Nostrand	6	6

=== Third qualifier ===
First round
3	(France) Nathalie Tauziat	6	6
(Australia) Pam Whytcross	2	4
(Brazil) Luciana Corsato	4	1^{r}
(United Kingdom) Lorrayne Gracie	6	4
(United States) Jane Forman	5	4
(South Africa) Elna Reinach	7	6
(United States) Renee Blount	7^{8}	2	2
11	(Hungary) Csilla Bartos	6^{6}	6	6

Second round
3	(France) Nathalie Tauziat	7	5	3
(United Kingdom) Lorrayne Gracie	5	7	6
(South Africa) Elna Reinach	6	0
11	(Hungary) Csilla Bartos	1	0^{r}

Qualifying competition
(United Kingdom) Lorrayne Gracie	7^{11}	0	5
(South Africa) Elna Reinach	6^{9}	6	7

=== Fourth qualifier ===
First round
9	(United States) Maeve Quinlan	3	6	3
(Republic of Ireland) Jo Griffiths	6	4	6
(Australia) Jenny Byrne	6	6
(Australia) Michelle Turk	4	4
(United States) Ronni Reis	6	1	5
(United States) Heather Crowe	4	6	7
(United States) Kirsten Dreyer	0	4
7	(South Africa) Jennifer Mundel	6	6

Second round
(Republic of Ireland) Jo Griffiths	1	0
(Australia) Jenny Byrne	6	6
(United States) Heather Crowe	6	7
7	(South Africa) Jennifer Mundel	1	6

Qualifying competition
(Australia) Jenny Byrne	6	6
(United States) Heather Crowe	3	3

=== Fifth qualifier ===
First round
8	(United States) Kim Steinmetz	6	4	1
(Australia) Rebecca Bryant	3	6	6
(Soviet Union) Svetlana Cherneva	6	6^{3}	6
(Canada) Karen Dewis	4	7^{7}	2
(Australia) Louise Field	3	2
(United Kingdom) Belinda Borneo	6	6
(New Zealand) Julie Richardson	2	2
12	(United States) Patty Fendick	6	6

Second round
(Australia) Rebecca Bryant	1	6	6
(Soviet Union) Svetlana Cherneva	6	3	4
(United Kingdom) Belinda Borneo	1	4
12	(United States) Patty Fendick	6	6

Qualifying competition
(Australia) Rebecca Bryant	4	4
12	(United States) Patty Fendick	6	6

=== Sixth qualifier ===
First round
15	(United States) Hu Na	6	7^{7}
(Hong Kong) Patricia Hy	1	6^{5}
(Sweden) Carin Anderholm	1	1
(Australia) Lisa O'Neill	6	6
(United States) Cheryl Jones	5	6	2
(United States) Karin Huebner	7	2	6
(United Kingdom) Valda Lake	1	4
4	(Czechoslovakia) Lea Plchová	6	6

Second round
15	(United States) Hu Na	6	6
(Australia) Lisa O'Neill	4	1
(United States) Karin Huebner	6^{1}	3
4	(Czechoslovakia) Lea Plchová	7^{7}	6

Qualifying competition
15	(United States) Hu Na	6	6
4	(Czechoslovakia) Lea Plchová	0	3

=== Seventh qualifier ===
First round
6	(United States) Kris Kinney	6	6
(United States) Micki Schillig	2	1
(Canada) Hélène Pelletier	7^{7}	5	9
(United States) Anna-Maria Fernandez	6^{4}	7	11
(Sweden) Helena Dahlström	3	5
(United States) Ann Hulbert	6	7
(Australia) Colleen Carney	1	4
10	(West Germany) Andrea Betzner	6	6

Second round
6	(United States) Kris Kinney	6	6
(United States) Anna-Maria Fernandez	4	4
(United States) Ann Hulbert	3	6^{6}
10	(West Germany) Andrea Betzner	6	7^{8}

Qualifying competition
6	(United States) Kris Kinney	4	6	3
10	(West Germany) Andrea Betzner	6	3	6

=== Eighth qualifier ===
First round
13	(United States) Linda Howell	6	6
(Japan) Akiko Kijimuta	3	4
(Soviet Union) Natasha Reva	3	1
(United States) Anna Ivan	6	6
(Brazil) Cláudia Monteiro	6	2	9
(Sweden) Elisabeth Ekblom	2	6	11
(United Kingdom) Linda Geeves	3	0
2	(United States) Kim Sands	6	6

Second round
13	(United States) Linda Howell	6	6
(United States) Anna Ivan	3	3
(Sweden) Elisabeth Ekblom	6	6
2	(United States) Kim Sands	3	3

Qualifying competition
13	(United States) Linda Howell	6^{7}	2
(Sweden) Elisabeth Ekblom	7^{9}	6
