= 1985 Wimbledon Championships – Boys' singles =

Boys' singles
- 1985 Wimbledon Championships

Final
- Champion: (Mexico) Leonardo Lavalle
- Runner-up: (Mexico) Eduardo Vélez
- Score: 6–4, 6–4

Events
Singles	men	women		boys	girls
Doubles	men	women	mixed	boys	girls
WC Singles	men	women	quad
WC Doubles	men	women	quad
Legends	men	women	seniors
← 1984 ·	Wimbledon Championships	· 1986 →

Leonardo Lavalle defeated Eduardo Vélez in the final, 6–4, 6–4 to win the boys' singles tennis title at the 1985 Wimbledon Championships.

== Seeds ==
1. (Mexico) Leonardo Lavalle (champion)
2. (Sweden) Christer Allgårdh (first round)
3. (Peru) Jaime Yzaga (semifinals)
4. (United Kingdom) Jason Goodall (first round)
5. (Australia) Patrick Flynn (first round)
6. (Mexico) Agustín Moreno (first round)
7. (Argentina) Franco Davín (third round)
8. (Portugal) João Silva (quarterfinals)
9. (Australia) Brett Custer (third round)
10. (United States) John Boytim (third round)
11. (United States) Joey Blake (second round)
12. (Italy) Claudio Pistolesi (first round)
13. (Argentina) Guillermo Pérez Roldán (second round)
14. (Japan) Shuzo Matsuoka (third round)
15. (Chile) Sergio Cortés (first round)
16. (Philippines) Felix Barrientos (semifinals)

Click on the seed number of a player to go to their draw section.

== Draw ==
=== Key ===
- Q = Qualifier
- WC = Wild card
- LL = Lucky loser
- Alt = Alternate
- ITF = ITF entry
- PR = Protected ranking
- SR = Special ranking
- SE = Special exempt
- JE = Junior exempt
- JR = Junior Accelerator Programme entrant
- CO = College Accelerator Programme entrant
- NG = Next Gen Accelerator Program entrant
- w/o = Walkover
- r = Retired
- d = Defaulted

=== Finals ===
Quarterfinals
1	(Mexico) Leonardo Lavalle	5	6	6
(United States) Tim Trigueiro	7	3	1
3	(Peru) Jaime Yzaga	4	6	7
(South Africa) Grant Saacks	6	1	5
16	(Philippines) Felix Barrientos	4	6	6
(Spain) Javier Sánchez	6	4	3
8	(Portugal) João Silva	5	3
(Mexico) Eduardo Vélez	7	6

Semifinals
1	(Mexico) Leonardo Lavalle	2	6	6
3	(Peru) Jaime Yzaga	6	2	3
16	(Philippines) Felix Barrientos	6	0
(Mexico) Eduardo Vélez	7	6

Final
1	(Mexico) Leonardo Lavalle	6	6
(Mexico) Eduardo Vélez	4	4

=== Top half ===
==== Section 1 ====
First round
1	(Mexico) Leonardo Lavalle	6	6
(Japan) Ryuso Tsujino	2	2
(Thailand) Thanakorn Srichaphan	6	6
(Hong Kong) Pang Lui	2	1
(Republic of Ireland) Eoin Collins	3	4
(United Kingdom) David Ison	6	6
(Spain) Florentino Anda	6	4
14	(Japan) Shuzo Matsuoka	7	6
12	(Italy) Claudio Pistolesi	6	3
(United States) Tim Trigueiro	7	6
(Romania) Mihnea-Ion Năstase	6	6
(United Kingdom) Nicholas Jones	3	3
(United Kingdom) Richard Whichello	4	6	6
(Socialist Federal Republic of Yugoslavia) Igor Šarić	6	3	0
(South Africa) Mark Kaplan	2	6	4
7	(Argentina) Franco Davín	6	4	6

Second round
1	(Mexico) L Lavalle	6	6
(Thailand) T Srichaphan	4	0
(United Kingdom) D Ison	3	3
14	(Japan) S Matsuoka	6	6
(United States) T Trigueiro	6	6
(Romania) M-I Năstase	4	4
(United Kingdom) R Whichello	6	2	1
7	(Argentina) F Davín	3	6	6

Third round
1	(Mexico) L Lavalle	6	6
14	(Japan) S Matsuoka	3	2
(United States) T Trigueiro	6	6
7	(Argentina) F Davín	1	4

Quarterfinals
1	(Mexico) L Lavalle	5	6	6
(United States) T Trigueiro	7	3	1

==== Section 2 ====
First round
3	(Peru) Jaime Yzaga	6	6
(United Kingdom) Christopher Peet	1	1
(Czechoslovakia) Cyril Suk	3	1
(Netherlands) Marc van Eekeren	6	6
(Thailand) Woraphol Thongkhamchu	2	4
(Czechoslovakia) Petr Korda	6	6
(Colombia) Augosto Solano	0	3
11	(United States) Joey Blake	6	6
13	(Argentina) Guillermo Pérez Roldán	6	6
(Hong Kong) Rolf Harrison	4	3
(South Africa) Grant Saacks	6	7
(Venezuela) Nicolás Pereira	4	5
(Hong Kong) Kester Ng	6	2	4
(South Korea) Kim Jae-sik	4	6	6
(Poland) Wojciech Kowalski	6	6
6	(Mexico) Agustín Moreno	4	4

Second round
3	(Peru) J Yzaga	6	6
(Netherlands) M van Eekeren	3	3
(Czechoslovakia) P Korda	6	1	6
11	(United States) J Blake	4	6	1
13	(Argentina) G Pérez Roldán	6	6	2
(South Africa) G Saacks	7	3	6
(South Korea) J-s Kim	6	3	6
(Poland) W Kowalski	2	6	3

Third round
3	(Peru) J Yzaga	6	7	6
(Czechoslovakia) P Korda	7	5	2
(South Africa) G Saacks	6	6
(South Korea) J-s Kim	1	3

Quarterfinals
3	(Peru) J Yzaga	4	6	7
(South Africa) G Saacks	6	1	5

=== Bottom half ===
==== Section 3 ====
First round
5	(Australia) Patrick Flynn	6	6	2
(Finland) Veli Paloheimo	3	7	6
(Uruguay) Marcelo Filippini	3	5
(France) Stéphane Grenier	6	7
(Chile) Rubén Gajardo	4	0
(United States) Chris Garner	6	6
(South Africa) Brent Haygarth	6	3	4
16	(Philippines) Felix Barrientos	1	6	6
9	(Australia) Brett Custer	4	7	7
(South Africa) Darryl Shapiro	6	6	5
(Denmark) Nick Brendtsen	7	2	2
(West Germany) Karsten Braasch	6	6	6
(Zimbabwe) Graham Cohen	2	3
(Spain) Javier Sánchez	6	6
(Sweden) David Engel	1	7	6
4	(United Kingdom) Jason Goodall	6	5	1

Second round
(Finland) V Paloheimo	6	6
(France) S Grenier	3	4
(United States) C Garner	5	6	0
16	(Philippines) F Barrientos	7	4	6
9	(Australia) B Custer	6	6
(West Germany) K Braasch	2	3
(Spain) J Sánchez	4	7	6
(Sweden) D Engel	6	5	3

Third round
(Finland) V Paloheimo	2	4
16	(Philippines) F Barrientos	6	6
9	(Australia) B Custer	7	3	5
(Spain) J Sánchez	6	6	7

Quarterfinals
16	(Philippines) F Barrientos	4	6	6
(Spain) J Sánchez	6	4	3

==== Section 4 ====
First round
8	(Portugal) João Silva	6	6
(United Kingdom) Austen Brice	1	4
(India) Zeeshan Ali	3	1
(Switzerland) Rolf Hertzog	6	6
(Brazil) Eduardo Furusho	6	6
(Philippines) Joseph Lizardo	1	2
(United States) Buff Farrow	6	6
10	(United States) John Boytim	7	7
15	(Chile) Sergio Cortés	4	4
(France) François Errard	6	6
(Italy) Ugo Colombini	6	6
(India) Hari Aiyar	4	2
(Belgium) Alain Meeus	3	6	10
(India) Zubin Irani	6	4	8
(Mexico) Eduardo Vélez	5	6	6
2	(Sweden) Christer Allgårdh	7	4	3

Second round
8	(Portugal) J Silva	6	6	6
(Switzerland) R Hertzog	2	7	1
(Brazil) E Furusho	3	4
10	(United States) J Boytim	6	6
(France) F Errard	6	6	10
(Italy) U Colombini	4	7	12
(Belgium) A Meeus	2	3
(Mexico) E Vélez	6	6

Third round
8	(Portugal) J Silva	6	7
10	(United States) J Boytim	2	6
(Italy) U Colombini	4	4
(Mexico) E Vélez	6	6

Quarterfinals
8	(Portugal) J Silva	5	3
(Mexico) E Vélez	7	6
