= 1985 Wimbledon Championships – Boys' doubles =

Boys' doubles
- 1985 Wimbledon Championships

Final
- Champions: (Mexico) Agustín Moreno (Peru) Jaime Yzaga
- Runners-up: (Czechoslovakia) Petr Korda (Czechoslovakia) Cyril Suk
- Score: 7–6^{(7–3)}, 6–4

Events
Singles	men	women		boys	girls
Doubles	men	women	mixed	boys	girls
WC Singles	men	women	quad
WC Doubles	men	women	quad
Legends	men	women	seniors
← 1984 ·	Wimbledon Championships	· 1986 →

Agustín Moreno and Jaime Yzaga defeated Petr Korda and Cyril Suk in the final, 7–6^{(7–3)}, 6–4 to win the boys' doubles tennis title at the 1985 Wimbledon Championships.

== Seeds ==
1. (Mexico) Leonardo Lavalle / (Romania) Mihnea-Ion Năstase (first round)
2. (Czechoslovakia) Petr Korda / (Czechoslovakia) Cyril Suk (final)
3. (South Africa) Grant Saacks / (South Africa) Darryl Shapiro (quarterfinals)
4. (Australia) Brett Custer / (Australia) Patrick Flynn (semifinals)

== Draw ==
=== Key ===
- Q = Qualifier
- WC = Wild card
- LL = Lucky loser
- Alt = Alternate
- SE = Special exempt
- PR = Protected ranking
- ITF = ITF entry
- JE = Junior exempt
- w/o = Walkover
- r = Retired
- d = Defaulted
- SR = Special ranking

=== Draw ===
First round
1	(Mexico) Leonardo Lavalle (Romania) Mihnea-Ion Năstase	4	6	8
(Mexico) Agustín Moreno (Peru) Jaime Yzaga	6	3	10
(Poland) Wojciech Kowalski (Netherlands) Marc van Eekeren	5	6	7
(United States) Buff Farrow (Portugal) João Silva	7	1	5
3	(South Africa) Grant Saacks (South Africa) Darryl Shapiro	6	7	6
(Japan) Shuzo Matsuoka (Japan) Ryuso Tsujino	7	6	4
(Hong Kong) Rolf Harrison (Hong Kong) Kester Ng	7^{8}	6
(Brazil) Eduardo Furusho (Uruguay) Marcelo Filippini	6^{6}	4
(United Kingdom) Jason Goodall (United Kingdom) Richard Whichello	6	6
(Belgium) Alain Meeus (Finland) Veli Paloheimo	1	2
(Thailand) Thanakorn Srichaphan (Thailand) Woraphol Thongkhamchu	4	6	11
4	(Australia) Brett Custer (Australia) Patrick Flynn	6	1	13
(United States) Joey Blake (United States) Tim Trigueiro	6	5	4
(United Kingdom) Austen Brice (United Kingdom) David Ison	3	7	6
(United States) John Boytim (United States) Chris Garner	6	6
2	(Czechoslovakia) Petr Korda (Czechoslovakia) Cyril Suk	7	7

Quarterfinals
(Mexico) Agustín Moreno (Peru) Jaime Yzaga	5	6	6
(Poland) Wojciech Kowalski (Netherlands) Marc van Eekeren	7	1	2
3	(South Africa) Grant Saacks (South Africa) Darryl Shapiro	6	3	4
(Hong Kong) Rolf Harrison (Hong Kong) Kester Ng	4	6	6
(United Kingdom) Jason Goodall (United Kingdom) Richard Whichello	w/o
4	(Australia) Brett Custer (Australia) Patrick Flynn
(United Kingdom) Austen Brice (United Kingdom) David Ison	4	6	6
2	(Czechoslovakia) Petr Korda (Czechoslovakia) Cyril Suk	6	4	8

Semifinals
(Mexico) Agustín Moreno (Peru) Jaime Yzaga	6	6
(Hong Kong) Rolf Harrison (Hong Kong) Kester Ng	3	4
4	(Australia) Brett Custer (Australia) Patrick Flynn	6	3	4
2	(Czechoslovakia) Petr Korda (Czechoslovakia) Cyril Suk	3	6	6

Final
(Mexico) Agustín Moreno (Peru) Jaime Yzaga	7^{7}	6
2	(Czechoslovakia) Petr Korda (Czechoslovakia) Cyril Suk	6^{3}	4
