= Leighton Alfred =

British tennis player and coach

- Country (sports): United Kingdom
- Born: 27 August 1962 (age 62); Wales
- Height: 5 ft 11 in (180 cm)
- Plays: Left-handed

Singles
- Career record: 0–1
- Highest ranking: No. 421 (8 Jul 1985)

Grand Slam singles results
- Wimbledon: 1R (1985)

Doubles
- Career record: 0–1
- Highest ranking: No. 190 (9 Sep 1985)

Grand Slam doubles results
- Wimbledon: Q2 (1984, 1985)

Leighton Alfred (born 27 August 1962) is a British tennis coach and former professional player. As a coach he has worked with many British tennis players, including Dan Evans.

A left-handed player from Wales, Alfred competed on the professional tour in the 1980s. He featured as a wildcard in the singles main draw of the 1985 Wimbledon Championships, losing in the first round to Leif Shiras.

== Challenger titles ==
=== Doubles: (1) ===
| No. | Date | Tournament | Surface | Partner | Opponents | Score |
|---|---|---|---|---|---|---|
| 1. | 28 July 1985 | Istanbul, Turkey | Clay | (Netherlands) Tom Nijssen | (Argentina) Gustavo Luza (Belgium) Eduardo Masso | 6–2, 6–3 |
