= Charles Honey =

South African tennis player

- Full name: Charles Honey
- Country (sports): South Africa
- Born: 1962 (age 62–63); Johannesburg, South Africa
- Plays: Right-handed

Singles
- Career record: 0–5
- Career titles: 0
- Highest ranking: No. 319 (1 May 1989)

Grand Slam singles results
- Australian Open: 1R (1989)

Doubles
- Career record: 7–13
- Career titles: 0
- Highest ranking: No. 92 (26 August 1985)

Grand Slam doubles results
- French Open: 1R (1985)
- Wimbledon: 2R (1985)
- US Open: 1R (1985)

Mixed doubles

Grand Slam mixed doubles results
- French Open: 2R (1985)
- Wimbledon: 3R (1985)

Charles Honey (born 1962) is a former professional tennis player from South Africa.

== Biography ==
Honey comes from Johannesburg and was runner-up in the 1977 South African Junior Championships.

=== College ===
In the early 1980s he went to the United States to attend Trinity University, in San Antonio, Texas. He was an All-American varsity tennis player in the 1984 season, then turned professional soon after.

During his professional career he remained based in the United States.

=== Professional career ===
In 1985 he began playing in Grand Prix tournaments and made most of his impact as a doubles player, with semi-final appearances at the Lorraine Open and Livingston Open, partnering Christo Steyn. He also made the men's doubles main draws at the French Open, Wimbledon and US Open in 1985, all with Christo Steyn. At Wimbledon he and Steyn came close to upsetting fourth seeds Stefan Edberg and Anders Järryd when they met in the second round, in a match that went to five sets. He made the third round of the mixed doubles, with another Trinity player Gretchen Rush.

At the 1989 Australian Open, Honey made it through singles qualifying, then was unable to get past first round opponent Niclas Kroon.

Honey has been a coach at the John Newcombe Tennis Academy in San Antonio.
