= Lea Plchová =

Czech tennis player

- Country (sports): Czechoslovakia
- Born: 31 August 1956 (age 68); Brno, Czechoslovakia
- Retired: 1986
- Prize money: $45,765

Singles
- Career record: 25–22
- Career titles: 0
- Highest ranking: No. 492 (2 February 1984)

Grand Slam singles results
- French Open: 1R (1983)
- Wimbledon: 2R (1985)
- US Open: Q1 (1985)

Doubles
- Career record: 10–11
- Career titles: 0
- Highest ranking: No. 462 (2 February 1984)

Grand Slam doubles results
- French Open: 2R (1983)

Lea Plchová (born 31 August 1956) is a former professional tennis player.

== Personal background ==
Her mother Ludmila was a tennis coach and is credited with discovering tennis player Jana Novotná, having spotted Jana on a playground in the neighbourhood she worked. Impressed with her mobility, Ludmila convinced Jana's parents to take her to train at a tennis centre where she worked.

== Tennis career ==
Plchová's best performance on the WTA Tour was a runner-up finish at the 1982 edition of the Austrian Open, losing the final to Virginia Ruzici.

At the 1983 French Open, she made her Grand Slam main-draw debut with appearances in both the singles and doubles draws. She played again at the 1984 French Open in the doubles.

Plchová featured in the main draw of the singles at the 1985 Wimbledon Championships as a lucky loser, with Rafaella Reggi withdrawing due to illness. She had a first-round win over the previous year's Wimbledon quarterfinalist, Carina Karlsson, before being beaten in the second round by Hu Na, whom she also lost to in the qualifying event.

== WTA career finals ==
=== Singles: 1 (runner-up) ===
Result	Date	Tournament	Tier	Surface	Opponent	Score
Loss	July 1982	Austrian Open	Category 1	Clay	(Romania) Virginia Ruzici	2–6, 2–6
