= 1985 Wimbledon Championships – Men's doubles =

Men's doubles
- 1985 Wimbledon Championships

Final
- Champions: (Switzerland) Heinz Günthardt (Hungary) Balázs Taróczy
- Runners-up: (Australia) Pat Cash (Australia) John Fitzgerald
- Score: 6–4, 6–3, 4–6, 6–3

Details
- Draw: 64 (5 Q / 5 WC )
- Seeds: 16

Events
Singles	men	women		boys	girls
Doubles	men	women	mixed	boys	girls
WC Singles	men	women	quad
WC Doubles	men	women	quad
Legends	men	women	seniors
← 1984 ·	Wimbledon Championships	· 1986 →

Peter Fleming and John McEnroe were the defending champions, but lost in the semifinals to Pat Cash and John Fitzgerald.

Heinz Günthardt and Balázs Taróczy defeated Cash and Fitzgerald in the final, 6–4, 6–3, 4–6, 6–3 to win the gentlemen's doubles title at the 1985 Wimbledon Championships.

== Seeds ==
1. (United States) Peter Fleming / (United States) John McEnroe (semifinals)
2. (Czechoslovakia) Pavel Složil / (Czechoslovakia) Tomáš Šmíd (second round)
3. (United States) Ken Flach / (United States) Robert Seguso (first round)
4. (Sweden) Stefan Edberg / (Sweden) Anders Järryd (third round)
5. (Australia) Pat Cash / (Australia) John Fitzgerald (final)
6. (Australia) Mark Edmondson / (Australia) Kim Warwick (first round)
7. (Sweden) Joakim Nyström / (Sweden) Mats Wilander (first round)
8. (Switzerland) Heinz Günthardt / (Hungary) Balázs Taróczy (champions)
9. (United States) Paul Annacone / (South Africa) Christo van Rensburg (quarterfinals)
10. (Australia) Broderick Dyke / (Australia) Wally Masur (first round)
11. (Paraguay) Francisco González / (United States) Matt Mitchell (first round)
12. (France) Henri Leconte / (France) Yannick Noah (second round)
13. (United States) Tony Giammalva / (United States) Sammy Giammalva (second round)
14. (United States) Kevin Curren / (United States) Johan Kriek (quarterfinals)
15. (United States) Steve Meister / (United States) Eliot Teltscher (third round)
16. (Australia) Peter Doohan / (Australia) Michael Fancutt (first round)

Click on the seed number of a player to go to their draw section.

== Draw ==
=== Key ===
- Q = Qualifier
- WC = Wild card
- LL = Lucky loser
- Alt = Alternate
- ITF = ITF entry
- PR = Protected ranking
- SR = Special ranking
- SE = Special exempt
- JE = Junior exempt
- JR = Junior Accelerator Programme entrant
- CO = College Accelerator Programme entrant
- NG = Next Gen Accelerator Program entrant
- w/o = Walkover
- r = Retired
- d = Defaulted

=== Finals ===
Quarterfinals
1	(United States) Peter Fleming (United States) John McEnroe	6	6	7
(United States) Tim Gullikson (United States) Tom Gullikson	3	4	6
14	(United States) Kevin Curren (United States) Johan Kriek	1	5	4
5	(Australia) Pat Cash (Australia) John Fitzgerald	6	7	6
8	(Switzerland) Heinz Günthardt (Hungary) Balázs Taróczy	6	2	6	6	24
9	(United States) Paul Annacone (South Africa) Christo van Rensburg	4	6	4	7	22
(South Africa) Eddie Edwards (United States) Charles Strode	1	4	2
WC	(Australia) Peter McNamara (Australia) Paul McNamee	6	6	6

Semifinals
1	(United States) Peter Fleming (United States) John McEnroe	6	6	1	4
5	(Australia) Pat Cash (Australia) John Fitzgerald	7	2	6	6
8	(Switzerland) Heinz Günthardt (Hungary) Balázs Taróczy	6	6	6	6
WC	(Australia) Peter McNamara (Australia) Paul McNamee	7	1	2	4

Final
5	(Australia) Pat Cash (Australia) John Fitzgerald	4	3	6	3
8	(Switzerland) Heinz Günthardt (Hungary) Balázs Taróczy	6	6	4	6

=== Top half ===
==== Section 1 ====
First round
1	(United States) P Fleming (United States) J McEnroe	6	6	3	6
(United States) M Purcell (United States) V Van Patten	3	4	6	4
(Australia) C Fancutt (Czechoslovakia) I Lendl	6	7	6	6	6
(Switzerland) J Hlasek (Italy) C Panatta	7	6	7	3	4
(United States) C Cox (United States) A Kohlberg	7	7	6
(United States) G Donnelly (United States) B Teacher	6	6	4
(United States) M Davis (United States) C Dunk	6	7	2	7
10	(Australia) B Dyke (Australia) W Masur	1	6	6	6
12	(France) H Leconte (France) Y Noah	7	7	6
(Brazil) M Hocevar (Brazil) J Soares	6	6	4
(United States) D Cassidy (United States) E Korita	6	6	5	6
Q	(New Zealand) K Evernden (South Africa) M Robertson	7	4	7	7
(West Germany) A Maurer (West Germany) W Popp	6	6	7	6	4
(United States) Ti Gullikson (United States) To Gullikson	7	4	5	7	6
(West Germany) B Becker (United States) M Leach	7	6	7
7	(Sweden) J Nyström (Sweden) M Wilander	5	3	6

Second round
1	(United States) P Fleming (United States) J McEnroe	7	3	6	6
(Australia) C Fancutt (Czechoslovakia) I Lendl	6	6	3	2
(United States) C Cox (United States) A Kohlberg	6	7	6
(United States) M Davis (United States) C Dunk	3	6	3
12	(France) H Leconte (France) Y Noah	7	5	0^{r}
Q	(New Zealand) K Evernden (South Africa) M Robertson	6	7	0
(United States) Ti Gullikson (United States) To Gullikson
(West Germany) B Becker (United States) M Leach	w/o

Third round
1	(United States) P Fleming (United States) J McEnroe	6	6	6
(United States) C Cox (United States) A Kohlberg	3	4	4
Q	(New Zealand) K Evernden (South Africa) M Robertson	7	3	5	5
(United States) Ti Gullikson (United States) To Gullikson	6	6	7	7

Quarterfinals
1	(United States) P Fleming (United States) J McEnroe	6	6	7
(United States) Ti Gullikson (United States) To Gullikson	3	4	6

==== Section 2 ====
First round
4	(Sweden) S Edberg (Sweden) A Järryd	6	7	7
(Australia) J Alexander (New Zealand) R Simpson	2	6	5
(South Africa) C Honey (South Africa) C Steyn	6	6	3	6	6
Q	(Brazil) D Campos (United States) R Harmon	3	7	6	4	4
(United States) T Delatte (United States) B Gilbert	7	7	6	6	1
WC	(United Kingdom) J Bates (United Kingdom) J Feaver	6	6	7	7	6
(Poland) W Fibak (Socialist Federal Republic of Yugoslavia) S Živojinović	4	2	5
14	(United States) K Curren (United States) J Kriek	6	6	7
15	(United States) S Meister (United States) E Teltscher	6	6	6
(Puerto Rico) E Fernández (United States) D Pate	4	4	4
WC	(United Kingdom) C Dowdeswell (United Kingdom) S Shaw	7	2	7	6
(West Germany) S Hermann (West Germany) T Meinecke	6	6	6	3
(Sweden) J Gunnarsson (Denmark) M Mortensen	6	6	3	7
(Australia) J Frawley (Paraguay) V Pecci	3	4	6	6
WC	(United Kingdom) S Bale (United Kingdom) R Lewis	2	3	4
5	(Australia) P Cash (Australia) J Fitzgerald	6	6	6

Second round
4	(Sweden) S Edberg (Sweden) A Järryd	6	6	6	6	6
(South Africa) C Honey (South Africa) C Steyn	2	2	7	7	4
WC	(United Kingdom) J Bates (United Kingdom) J Feaver	6	4	3
14	(United States) K Curren (United States) J Kriek	7	6	6
15	(United States) S Meister (United States) E Teltscher	6	6	6
WC	(United Kingdom) C Dowdeswell (United Kingdom) S Shaw	2	4	4
(Sweden) J Gunnarsson (Denmark) M Mortensen	7	6	3	4	4
5	(Australia) P Cash (Australia) J Fitzgerald	5	4	6	6	6

Third round
4	(Sweden) S Edberg (Sweden) A Järryd	4	6	4	6
14	(United States) K Curren (United States) J Kriek	6	3	6	7
15	(United States) S Meister (United States) E Teltscher	4	3	4
5	(Australia) P Cash (Australia) J Fitzgerald	6	6	6

Quarterfinals
14	(United States) K Curren (United States) J Kriek	1	5	4
5	(Australia) P Cash (Australia) J Fitzgerald	6	7	6

=== Bottom half ===
==== Section 3 ====
First round
8	(Switzerland) H Günthardt (Hungary) B Taróczy	6	6	6	6
(Israel) S Glickstein (United States) T Wilkison	7	4	3	4
(United States) M Bauer (Brazil) C Motta	7	6	6	3	3
(United States) G Lanyendecker (Canada) G Michibata	6	7	3	6	6
(India) V Amritraj (United Kingdom) J Lloyd	6	6	3	6	6
(Switzerland) M Günthardt (Hungary) Z Kuhárszky	4	7	6	3	2
(Australia) B Drewett (New Zealand) C Lewis	5	6	7	6
11	(Paraguay) F González (United States) M Mitchell	7	3	6	3
9	(United States) P Annacone (South Africa) C van Rensburg	7	6	7
(Spain) S Casal (Spain) E Sánchez	6	3	6
(Chile) R Acuña (United States) D Gitlin	6	3	4	7	3
(Australia) D Graham (Australia) L Warder	4	6	6	6	6
(South Africa) B Levine (United States) E Van't Hof	6	7	5	7
(United States) V Gerulaitis (South Africa) D Visser	4	6	7	6
WC	(United Kingdom) N Brown (United Kingdom) D Felgate	7	6	2	7
3	(United States) K Flach (United States) R Seguso	6	3	6	6

Second round
8	(Switzerland) H Günthardt (Hungary) B Taróczy	6	6	7
(United States) G Lanyendecker (Canada) G Michibata	4	4	6
(India) V Amritraj (United Kingdom) J Lloyd	7	6	5	6
(Australia) B Drewett (New Zealand) C Lewis	5	1	7	2
9	(United States) P Annacone (South Africa) C van Rensburg	6	6	6
(Australia) D Graham (Australia) L Warder	2	3	3
(South Africa) B Levine (United States) E Van't Hof	7	6	6	6
WC	(United Kingdom) N Brown (United Kingdom) D Felgate	6	7	3	4

Third round
8	(Switzerland) H Günthardt (Hungary) B Taróczy	6	6	6
(India) V Amritraj (United Kingdom) J Lloyd	4	0	4
9	(United States) P Annacone (South Africa) C van Rensburg	7	6	7
(South Africa) B Levine (United States) E Van't Hof	6	1	6

Quarterfinals
8	(Switzerland) H Günthardt (Hungary) B Taróczy	6	2	6	6	24
9	(United States) P Annacone (South Africa) C van Rensburg	4	6	4	7	22

==== Section 4 ====
First round
6	(Australia) M Edmondson (Australia) K Warwick	6	6	7	6	6
(United States) D Dowlen (Nigeria) N Odizor	7	7	6	4	8
(India) A Amritraj (United States) L Bourne	4	6	2	4
(South Africa) E Edwards (United States) C Strode	6	4	6	6
(United States) L Stefanki (United States) R Van't Hof	6	6	6
(Brazil) G Barbosa (Brazil) I Kley	3	2	4
(United States) S Davis (United States) S Denton	6	7	3	6
13	(United States) A Giammalva (United States) S Giammalva	7	6	6	7
16	(Australia) P Doohan (Australia) M Fancutt	7	6	5	7	5
(United States) H Pfister (United States) B Testerman	6	7	7	5	7
(United States) M De Palmer (United States) B Manson	6	6	6
Q	(Australia) M Kratzmann (Australia) S Youl	4	4	4
WC	(Australia) P McNamara (Australia) P McNamee	7	7	6
Q	(United States) M Freeman (United States) J Turpin	5	6	4
Q	(Australia) D Cahill (New Zealand) B Derlin	7	2	4	4
2	(Czechoslovakia) P Složil (Czechoslovakia) T Šmíd	6	6	6	6

Second round
(United States) D Dowlen (Nigeria) N Odizor	3	7	4	3
(South Africa) E Edwards (United States) C Strode	6	6	6	6
(United States) L Stefanki (United States) R Van't Hof	6	6	3	6
13	(United States) A Giammalva (United States) S Giammalva	4	1	6	3
(United States) H Pfister (United States) B Testerman	3	6	3
(United States) M De Palmer (United States) B Manson	6	7	6
WC	(Australia) P McNamara (Australia) P McNamee	6	7	6
2	(Czechoslovakia) P Složil (Czechoslovakia) T Šmíd	4	5	3

Third round
(South Africa) E Edwards (United States) C Strode	7	5	6	7
(United States) L Stefanki (United States) R Van't Hof	6	7	3	5
(United States) M De Palmer (United States) B Manson	3	5	4
WC	(Australia) P McNamara (Australia) P McNamee	6	7	6

Quarterfinals
(South Africa) E Edwards (United States) C Strode	1	4	2
WC	(Australia) P McNamara (Australia) P McNamee	6	6	6
