= 1985 Wimbledon Championships – Mixed doubles =

Mixed doubles
- 1985 Wimbledon Championships

Final
- Champions: (Australia) Paul McNamee (United States) Martina Navratilova
- Runners-up: (Australia) John Fitzgerald (Australia) Elizabeth Smylie
- Score: 7–5, 4–6, 6–2

Details
- Draw: 64 (3 Q )
- Seeds: 8

Events
| Singles | men | women | | boys | girls |
| Doubles | men | women | mixed | boys | girls |
| WC Singles | men | women | quad |
| WC Doubles | men | women | quad |
| Legends | men | women | seniors |
| ← 1984 · | Wimbledon Championships | · 1986 → |

John Lloyd and Wendy Turnbull were the two-time defending champions but lost in the quarterfinals to Mark Edmondson and Kathy Jordan.

Paul McNamee and Martina Navratilova defeated John Fitzgerald and Elizabeth Smylie in the final, 7–5, 4–6, 6–2 to win the mixed doubles tennis title at the 1985 Wimbledon Championships. Due to bad weather, the Mixed Doubles tournament became delayed and after McNamee and Navratilova won their semifinal match against Scott Davis and Betsy Nagelsen, ending 23–21 in the final set on a match played on Court 2, the team remained on court with only a thirty minute rest interval to play the final on the same court.

== Seeds ==
1. (United Kingdom) John Lloyd / (Australia) Wendy Turnbull (quarterfinals)
2. (Australia) Paul McNamee / (United States) Martina Navratilova (champions)
3. (United States) Robert Seguso / (United Kingdom) Anne Hobbs (second round, withdrew)
4. (Czechoslovakia) Pavel Složil / (Czechoslovakia) Helena Suková (quarterfinals)
5. (United States) Steve Denton / (United Kingdom) Jo Durie (quarterfinals)
6. (Australia) Mark Edmondson / (United States) Kathy Jordan (semifinals)
7. (Australia) John Fitzgerald / (Australia) Elizabeth Smylie (final)
8. (United States) Scott Davis / (United States) Betsy Nagelsen (semifinals)

Click on the seed number of a player to go to their draw section.

== Draw ==
=== Key ===
- Q = Qualifier
- WC = Wild card
- LL = Lucky loser
- Alt = Alternate
- SE = Special exempt
- PR = Protected ranking
- ITF = ITF entry
- JE = Junior exempt
- w/o = Walkover
- r = Retired
- d = Defaulted
- SR = Special ranking

=== Finals ===
Quarterfinals
1 | (United Kingdom) John Lloyd (Australia) Wendy Turnbull | 6 | 6
6 | (Australia) Mark Edmondson (United States) Kathy Jordan | 7 | 7
(United States) Eliot Teltscher (United States) Anne White | 6 | 4
7 | (Australia) John Fitzgerald (Australia) Elizabeth Smylie | 7 | 6
8 | (United States) Scott Davis (United States) Betsy Nagelsen | 6 | 6
4 | (Czechoslovakia) Pavel Složil (Czechoslovakia) Helena Suková | 3 | 4
5 | (United States) Steve Denton (United Kingdom) Jo Durie | 4 | 2
2 | (Australia) Paul McNamee (United States) Martina Navratilova | 6 | 6

Semifinals
6 | (Australia) Mark Edmondson (United States) Kathy Jordan | 6 | 5
7 | (Australia) John Fitzgerald (Australia) Elizabeth Smylie | 7 | 7
8 | (United States) Scott Davis (United States) Betsy Nagelsen | 7 | 5 | 21
2 | (Australia) Paul McNamee (United States) Martina Navratilova | 6 | 7 | 23

Final
7 | (Australia) John Fitzgerald (Australia) Elizabeth Smylie | 5 | 6 | 2
2 | (Australia) Paul McNamee (United States) Martina Navratilova | 7 | 4 | 6

=== Top half ===
==== Section 1 ====
First round
1 | (United Kingdom) J Lloyd (Australia) W Turnbull | 6 | 5 | 12
(Australia) J Newcombe (United States) A Leand | 1 | 7 | 10
(United States) H Pfister (United States) C Benjamin | 6 | 7
(Brazil) I Kley (Brazil) L Corsato | 2 | 5
(United States) M Bauer (France) C Tanvier | 7 | 6
(Australia) L Warder (Australia) A Minter | 6 | 4
(Australia) C Fancutt (Australia) E Minter | 6 | 6
LL | (United States) B Buffington (United States) J Kaplan | 1 | 2
(United Kingdom) J Smith (Japan) N Sato | 7 | 6
(West Germany) S Hermann (Sweden) C Karlsson | 5 | 2
(Hungary) Z Kuhárszky (Switzerland) C Jolissaint | w/o
(Chile) J Fillol (United States) P Casale
(Australia) K Warwick (United States) E Burgin | 7 | 7
Q | (Puerto Rico) E Fernández (New Zealand) B Perry | 6 | 6
(Australia) D Graham (Australia) P Whytcross | 2 | 2
6 | (Australia) M Edmondson (United States) K Jordan | 6 | 6

Second round
1 | (United Kingdom) J Lloyd (Australia) W Turnbull | 6 | 7
(United States) H Pfister (United States) C Benjamin | 1 | 6
(United States) M Bauer (France) C Tanvier | 7 | 3 | 6
(Australia) C Fancutt (Australia) E Minter | 6 | 6 | 4
(United Kingdom) J Smith (Japan) N Sato | 4 | 4
(Hungary) Z Kuhárszky (Switzerland) C Jolissaint | 6 | 6
(Australia) K Warwick (United States) E Burgin | 2 | 4
6 | (Australia) M Edmondson (United States) K Jordan | 6 | 6

Third round
1 | (United Kingdom) J Lloyd (Australia) W Turnbull | 6 | 6 | 6
(United States) M Bauer (France) C Tanvier | 3 | 7 | 3
(Hungary) Z Kuhárszky (Switzerland) C Jolissaint | 7 | 4 | 3
6 | (Australia) M Edmondson (United States) K Jordan | 6 | 6 | 6

Quarterfinals
1 | (United Kingdom) J Lloyd (Australia) W Turnbull | 6 | 6
6 | (Australia) M Edmondson (United States) K Jordan | 7 | 7

==== Section 2 ====
First round
3 | (United States) R Seguso (United Kingdom) A Hobbs | 6 | 7
(South Africa) F McMillan (Netherlands) B Stöve | 2 | 6
(South Africa) C Honey (United States) G Rush | 4 | 7 | 6
(Australia) O Davidson (United Kingdom) A Croft | 6 | 6 | 4
(New Zealand) B Derlin (West Germany) M Schropp | 4 | 6
(United States) E Teltscher (United States) A White | 6 | 7
(United States) C Cox (United States) W White | 4 | 6
Q | (Brazil) D Campos (United States) M Van Nostrand | 6 | 7
(Brazil) C Motta (Brazil) C Monteiro | 6 | 6
LL | (United States) R Meyer (United States) L Howell | 1 | 4
(Brazil) M Hocevar (Brazil) N Dias | 3 | 6 | 1
(United States) M Riessen (United States) R Casals | 6 | 1 | 6
Alt | (United Kingdom) N Fulwood (United Kingdom) L Gracie | 6 | 7
(Australia) A Roche (Australia) J Dalton | 2 | 5
(United States) D Gitlin (United States) J Golder | 2 | 2
7 | (Australia) J Fitzgerald (Australia) E Smylie | 6 | 6

Second round
3 | (United States) R Seguso (United Kingdom) A Hobbs
(South Africa) C Honey (United States) G Rush | w/o
(United States) E Teltscher (United States) A White | 6 | 6
Q | (Brazil) D Campos (United States) M Van Nostrand | 4 | 4
(Brazil) C Motta (Brazil) C Monteiro | 6 | 6 | 6
(United States) M Riessen (United States) R Casals | 4 | 7 | 2
Alt | (United Kingdom) N Fulwood (United Kingdom) L Gracie | 1 | 4
7 | (Australia) J Fitzgerald (Australia) E Smylie | 6 | 6

Third round
(South Africa) C Honey (United States) G Rush | 7 | 3 | 4
(United States) E Teltscher (United States) A White | 5 | 6 | 6
(Brazil) C Motta (Brazil) C Monteiro | 1 | 0
7 | (Australia) J Fitzgerald (Australia) E Smylie | 6 | 6

Quarterfinals
(United States) E Teltscher (United States) A White | 6 | 4
7 | (Australia) J Fitzgerald (Australia) E Smylie | 7 | 6

=== Bottom half ===
==== Section 3 ====
First round
8 | (United States) S Davis (United States) E Nagelsen | 6 | 6
(Australia) C Dibley (Japan) E Inoue | 3 | 4
Q | (Canada) G Michibata (Hong Kong) P Hy | 5 | 6 | 5
(South Africa) M Robertson (South Africa) R Uys | 7 | 1 | 7
(South Africa) B Levine (South Africa) Y Vermaak | 6 | 7
(Netherlands) T Okker (Australia) D Balestrat | 3 | 6
(Australia) M Fancutt (United States) C Reynolds | 5 | 6
(United Kingdom) C Dowdeswell (South Africa) R Fairbank | 7 | 7
(South Africa) C van Rensburg (South Africa) M Reinach | 6 | 7
(United States) C Wittus (United States) B Gerken | 4 | 5
(Australia) P Doohan (Australia) B Remilton | 6 | 5 | 6
(Spain) E Sánchez (Bulgaria) K Maleeva | 3 | 7 | 4
(United States) S Meister (United States) P Barg | 5 | 5
(Australia) P McNamara (Hungary) A Temesvári | 7 | 7
LL | (Australia) M Kratzmann (Australia) J Byrne | 2 | 2
4 | (Czechoslovakia) P Složil (Czechoslovakia) H Suková | 6 | 6

Second round
8 | (United States) S Davis (United States) E Nagelsen | 6 | 1 | 6
(South Africa) M Robertson (South Africa) R Uys | 4 | 6 | 3
(South Africa) B Levine (South Africa) Y Vermaak | 4 | 2
(United Kingdom) C Dowdeswell (South Africa) R Fairbank | 6 | 6
(South Africa) C van Rensburg (South Africa) M Reinach | 6 | 2 | 3
(Australia) P Doohan (Australia) B Remilton | 3 | 6 | 6
(Australia) P McNamara (Hungary) A Temesvári | 2 | 3
4 | (Czechoslovakia) P Složil (Czechoslovakia) H Suková | 6 | 6

Third round
8 | (United States) S Davis (United States) E Nagelsen | 6 | 6 | 6
(United Kingdom) C Dowdeswell (South Africa) R Fairbank | 7 | 4 | 2
(Australia) P Doohan (Australia) B Remilton | 4 | 2
4 | (Czechoslovakia) P Složil (Czechoslovakia) H Suková | 6 | 6

Quarterfinals
8 | (United States) S Davis (United States) E Nagelsen | 6 | 6
4 | (Czechoslovakia) P Složil (Czechoslovakia) H Suková | 3 | 4

==== Section 4 ====
First round
5 | (United States) S Denton (United Kingdom) J Durie | 7 | 6
(United Kingdom) J Bates (United Kingdom) S Gomer | 6 | 4
(United States) T Gullikson (Bulgaria) M Maleeva | 6 | 6
(New Zealand) D Mustard (New Zealand) J Richardson | 4 | 3
(Netherlands) H van Boeckel (Netherlands) M Mesker | 4 | 4
(United States) R Harmon (United States) Z Garrison | 6 | 6
(Paraguay) F González (United States) P Smith | 4 | 6 | 3
(United States) A Giammalva (United States) A Smith | 6 | 3 | 6
(Chile) R Acuña (Canada) J Hetherington | 7 | 5 | 6
(United States) S Stewart (South Africa) I Kloss | 5 | 7 | 3
(United States) G Holmes (Canada) C Bassett | 6 | 7
(United Kingdom) J Feaver (United Kingdom) V Wade | 2 | 5
Alt | (United States) G Niebur (United States) K McDaniel | 2 | 4
(United States) C Strode (Soviet Union) L Savchenko | 6 | 6
(United States) B Testerman (United States) S Walsh-Pete | 4 | 1
2 | (Australia) P McNamee (United States) M Navratilova | 6 | 6

Second round
5 | (United States) S Denton (United Kingdom) J Durie | 5 | 6 | 6
(United States) T Gullikson (Bulgaria) M Maleeva | 7 | 2 | 4
(United States) R Harmon (United States) Z Garrison | 5 | 6 | 4
(United States) A Giammalva (United States) A Smith | 7 | 4 | 6
(Chile) R Acuña (Canada) J Hetherington | 6 | 3 | 6
(United States) G Holmes (Canada) C Bassett | 4 | 6 | 3
(United States) C Strode (Soviet Union) L Savchenko | 6 | 2 | 0
2 | (Australia) P McNamee (United States) M Navratilova | 4 | 6 | 6

Third round
5 | (United States) S Denton (United Kingdom) J Durie | 3 | 6 | 10
(United States) A Giammalva (United States) A Smith | 6 | 4 | 8
(Chile) R Acuña (Canada) J Hetherington | 3 | 6 | 2
2 | (Australia) P McNamee (United States) M Navratilova | 6 | 3 | 6

Quarterfinals
5 | (United States) S Denton (United Kingdom) J Durie | 4 | 2
2 | (Australia) P McNamee (United States) M Navratilova | 6 | 6
