= 1985 Wimbledon Championships – Girls' singles =

Girls' singles
- 1985 Wimbledon Championships

Final
- Champion: (Czechoslovakia) Andrea Holíková
- Runner-up: (Australia) Jenny Byrne
- Score: 7–5, 6–1

Events
Singles	men	women		boys	girls
Doubles	men	women	mixed	boys	girls
WC Singles	men	women	quad
WC Doubles	men	women	quad
Legends	men	women	seniors
← 1984 ·	Wimbledon Championships	· 1986 →

Andrea Holíková defeated Jenny Byrne in the final, 7–5, 6–1 to win the girls' singles tennis title at the 1985 Wimbledon Championships.

== Seeds ==
1. (Canada) Helen Kelesi (semifinals)
2. (Italy) Laura Garrone (second round)
3. (Czechoslovakia) Andrea Holíková (champion)
4. (Australia) Janine Thompson (second round)
5. (United States) Mary Joe Fernández (semifinals)
6. (South Africa) Elna Reinach (quarterfinals)
7. (Australia) Jenny Byrne (final)
8. (Sweden) Helena Dahlström (quarterfinals)

Click on the seed number of a player to go to their draw section.

== Draw ==
=== Key ===
- Q = Qualifier
- WC = Wild card
- LL = Lucky loser
- Alt = Alternate
- SE = Special exempt
- PR = Protected ranking
- ITF = ITF entry
- JE = Junior exempt
- w/o = Walkover
- r = Retired
- d = Defaulted
- SR = Special ranking

=== Finals ===
Quarterfinals
1	(Canada) Helen Kelesi	6	6
8	(Sweden) Helena Dahlström	1	2
3	(Czechoslovakia) Andrea Holíková	6	7
6	(South Africa) Elna Reinach	2	5
3	(United States) Mary Joe Fernández	6	6
(New Zealand) Julie Richardson	4	3
7	(Australia) Jenny Byrne	6	6
(Netherlands) Digna Ketelaar	1	2

Semifinals
1	(Canada) Helen Kelesi	3	3
3	(Czechoslovakia) Andrea Holíková	6	6
5	(United States) Mary Joe Fernández	4	3
7	(Australia) Jenny Byrne	6	6

Final
3	(Czechoslovakia) Andrea Holíková	7	6
7	(Australia) Jenny Byrne	5	1

=== Top half ===
==== Section 1 ====
First round
(South Africa) Karen Schimper	6	6	8
(Netherlands) Hester Witvoet	4	7	6
(Australia) Louise Field	3	4
(United Kingdom) Jo Louis	6	6
(United Kingdom) Jane Wood	1	7	6
(Netherlands) Ingelise Driehuis	6	6	2
(Argentina) María Pérez Roldán	6	6
(Venezuela) Nives Missana	1	0

Second round
1	(Canada) Helen Kelesi	6	2	6
(South Africa) K Schimper	1	6	4
(Japan) Erica Kajitani	4	3
(United Kingdom) J Louis	6	6
(Japan) Eri Hirose	3	6
(United Kingdom) J Wood	6	7
(Argentina) M Pérez Roldán	3	0
8	(Sweden) Helena Dahlström	6	6

Third round
1	(Canada) H Kelesi	6	6
(United Kingdom) J Louis	1	0
(United Kingdom) J Wood	4	4
8	(Sweden) H Dahlström	6	6

Quarterfinals
1	(Canada) H Kelesi	6	6
8	(Sweden) H Dahlström	1	2

==== Section 2 ====
First round
(Hong Kong) Paulette Moreno	4	6
(Belgium) Sandra Wasserman	6	7
(France) Emmanuelle Derly	6	6
(United States) Stephanie London	2	4
(France) Sybille Niox-Château	5	6	6
(Indonesia) Yayuk Basuki	7	4	4
(Sweden) Monica Lundqvist	5	6	6
(United Kingdom) Suzi Mair	7	1	2

Second round
3	(Czechoslovakia) Andrea Holíková	6	7
(Belgium) S Wasserman	1	5
(France) E Derly	6	6
(Brazil) Marcela Raimo	0	1
(Belgium) Ann Devries	5	6	6
(France) S Niox-Château	7	4	4
(Sweden) M Lundqvist	4	4
6	(South Africa) Elna Reinach	6	6

Third round
3	(Czechoslovakia) A Holíková	6	6
(France) E Derly	1	3
(Belgium) A Devries	3	2
6	(South Africa) E Reinach	6	6

Quarterfinals
3	(Czechoslovakia) A Holíková	6	7
6	(South Africa) E Reinach	2	5

=== Bottom half ===
==== Section 3 ====
First round
(Australia) Michelle Turk	6	6
(Indonesia) Lukky Tedjamukti	0	0
(Philippines) Jennifer Saberon	4	4
(Japan) Akiko Kijimuta	6	6
(United States) Niurka Sodupe	2	2
(South Africa) Dinky van Rensburg	6	6
(France) Nathalie Tauziat	4	5
(New Zealand) Julie Richardson	6	7

Second round
3	(United States) Mary Joe Fernández	1	6	6
(Australia) M Turk	6	4	0
(Japan) A Kijimuta	2	6	7
(France) Alexia Dechaume	6	4	5
(South Africa) D van Rensburg	6	7
(United Kingdom) Clare Wood	4	5
(New Zealand) J Richardson	6	4	6
4	(Australia) Janine Thompson	3	6	2

Third round
3	(United States) MJ Fernández	6	6
(Japan) A Kijimuta	3	2
(South Africa) D van Rensburg	1	5
(New Zealand) J Richardson	6	7

Quarterfinals
3	(United States) MJ Fernández	6	6
(New Zealand) J Richardson	4	3

==== Section 4 ====
First round
(West Germany) Regina Wieser	6	6
(Colombia) Adriana Isaza	3	3
(Argentina) Patricia Tarabini	2	4
(Czechoslovakia) Radka Zrubáková	6	6
(Chile) Paulina Sepúlveda	2	2
(Brazil) Gisele Miró	6	6
(West Germany) Silke Meier	1	1
(Netherlands) Digna Ketelaar	6	6

Second round
7	(Australia) Jenny Byrne	6	6
(West Germany) R Wieser	2	0
(United States) Eleni Rossides	4	7	6
(Czechoslovakia) R Zrubáková	6	6	2
(Thailand) Tossaporn Summa	2	2
(Brazil) G Miró	6	6
(Netherlands) D Ketelaar	3	6	9
2	(Italy) Laura Garrone	6	3	7

Third round
7	(Australia) J Byrne	7	6	10
(United States) E Rossides	6	7	8
(Brazil) G Miró	4	4
(Netherlands) D Ketelaar	6	6

Quarterfinals
7	(Australia) J Byrne	6	6
(Netherlands) D Ketelaar	1	2
