= 1985 Wimbledon Championships – Girls' doubles =

Girls' doubles
- 1985 Wimbledon Championships

Final
- Champions: (Australia) Louise Field (Australia) Janine Thompson
- Runners-up: (South Africa) Elna Reinach (New Zealand) Julie Richardson
- Score: 6–1, 6–2

Events
Singles	men	women		boys	girls
Doubles	men	women	mixed	boys	girls
WC Singles	men	women	quad
WC Doubles	men	women	quad
Legends	men	women	seniors
← 1984 ·	Wimbledon Championships	· 1986 →

Louise Field and Janine Thompson defeated Elna Reinach and Julie Richardson in the final, 6–1, 6–2 to win the girls' doubles tennis title at the 1985 Wimbledon Championships.

== Seeds ==
1. (Czechoslovakia) Andrea Holíková / (Czechoslovakia) Radka Zrubáková (quarterfinals)
2. (South Africa) Elna Reinach / (New Zealand) Julie Richardson (final)
3. (Australia) Jenny Byrne / (Australia) Michelle Turk (semifinals)
4. (Australia) Louise Field / (Australia) Janine Thompson (champions)

== Draw ==
=== Key ===
- Q = Qualifier
- WC = Wild card
- LL = Lucky loser
- Alt = Alternate
- SE = Special exempt
- PR = Protected ranking
- ITF = ITF entry
- JE = Junior exempt
- w/o = Walkover
- r = Retired
- d = Defaulted
- SR = Special ranking

=== Draw ===
First round
1	(Czechoslovakia) Andrea Holíková (Czechoslovakia) Radka Zrubáková	6	6
(Colombia) Adriana Isaza (Venezuela) Nives Missana	2	1
(Japan) Akiko Kijimuta (Hong Kong) Paulette Moreno	3	3
(France) Alexia Dechaume (France) Emmanuelle Derly	6	6
4	(Australia) Louise Field (Australia) Janine Thompson	6	6	8
(South Africa) Karen Schimper (South Africa) Dinky van Rensburg	2	7	6
(Canada) Helen Kelesi (France) Nathalie Tauziat	6	7
(Netherlands) Digna Ketelaar (Netherlands) Hester Witvoet	4	5
(United Kingdom) Suzi Mair (United Kingdom) Clare Wood	6	6
(Brazil) Gisele Miró (France) Sybille Niox-Château	4	3
(United States) Stephanie London (United States) Niurka Sodupe	3	2
3	(Australia) Jenny Byrne (Australia) Michelle Turk	6	6
(Indonesia) Yayuk Basuki (Indonesia) Lukky Tedjamukti	3	2
(United Kingdom) Jo Louis (United Kingdom) Jane Wood	6	6
(Japan) Eri Hirose (Philippines) Jennifer Saberon	4	2
2	(South Africa) Elna Reinach (New Zealand) Julie Richardson	6	6

Quarterfinals
1	(Czechoslovakia) Andrea Holíková (Czechoslovakia) Radka Zrubáková	2	7	3
(France) Alexia Dechaume (France) Emmanuelle Derly	6	5	6
4	(Australia) Louise Field (Australia) Janine Thompson	6	6
(Canada) Helen Kelesi (France) Nathalie Tauziat	2	2
(United Kingdom) Suzi Mair (United Kingdom) Clare Wood	4	0
3	(Australia) Jenny Byrne (Australia) Michelle Turk	6	6
(United Kingdom) Jo Louis (United Kingdom) Jane Wood	2	3
2	(South Africa) Elna Reinach (New Zealand) Julie Richardson	6	6

Semifinals
(France) Alexia Dechaume (France) Emmanuelle Derly	2	2
4	(Australia) Louise Field (Australia) Janine Thompson	6	6
3	(Australia) Jenny Byrne (Australia) Michelle Turk	1	6	5
2	(South Africa) Elna Reinach (New Zealand) Julie Richardson	6	2	7

Final
4	(Australia) Louise Field (Australia) Janine Thompson	6	6
2	(South Africa) Elna Reinach (New Zealand) Julie Richardson	1	2
