= 1985 US Open (tennis) =

1985 edition of the US Open Tennis Championships

- Date: August 27 – September 8
- Edition: 105th
- Category: Grand Slam (ITF)
- Surface: Hardcourt
- Location: New York City, New York, United States

Champions

Men's singles
- (Czechoslovakia) Ivan Lendl

Women's singles
- (Czechoslovakia) Hana Mandlíková

Men's doubles
- (United States) Ken Flach / (United States) Robert Seguso

Women's doubles
- (West Germany) Claudia Kohde-Kilsch / (Czechoslovakia) Helena Suková

Mixed doubles
- (United States) Martina Navratilova / (Switzerland) Heinz Günthardt

Boys' singles
- (United States) Tim Trigueiro

Girls' singles
- (Italy) Laura Garrone

Boys' doubles
- (United States) Joey Blake / (United States) Darren Yates

Girls' doubles
- (Czechoslovakia) Andrea Holíková / (Czechoslovakia) Radka Zrubáková
- US Open

The 1985 US Open was a tennis tournament played on outdoor hard courts at the USTA National Tennis Center in New York City in New York in the United States. It was the 105th edition of the US Open and was held from August 27 to September 8, 1985.

== Seniors ==
=== Men's singles ===
(Czechoslovakia) Ivan Lendl defeated (United States) John McEnroe 7–6^{(7–1)}, 6–3, 6–4

- It was Lendl's 2nd career Grand Slam title and his 1st US Open title.

=== Women's singles ===
(Czechoslovakia) Hana Mandlíková defeated (United States) Martina Navratilova 7–6^{(7–3)}, 1–6, 7–6^{(7–2)}

- It was Mandlíková's 3rd career Grand Slam title and her 1st US Open title.

=== Men's doubles ===
(United States) Ken Flach / (United States) Robert Seguso defeated (France) Henri Leconte / (France) Yannick Noah 6–7^{(5–7)}, 7–6^{(7–1)}, 7–6^{(8–6)}, 6–0

- It was Flach's 1st career Grand Slam title and his 1st US Open title. It was Seguso's 1st career Grand Slam title and his only US Open title.

=== Women's doubles ===
(West Germany) Claudia Kohde-Kilsch / (Czechoslovakia) Helena Suková defeated (United States) Martina Navratilova / (United States) Pam Shriver 6–7^{(5–7)}, 6–2, 6–3

- It was Kohde-Kilsch's 1st career Grand Slam title and her only US Open title. It was Suková's 1st career Grand Slam title and her 1st US Open title.

=== Mixed doubles ===
(United States) Martina Navratilova / (Switzerland) Heinz Günthardt defeated (Australia) Elizabeth Smylie / (Australia) John Fitzgerald 6–3, 6–4

- It was Navratilova's 35th career Grand Slam title and her 8th US Open title. It was Günthardt's 4th and last career Grand Slam title and his only US Open title.

== Juniors ==
=== Boys' singles ===
(United States) Tim Trigueiro defeated (United States) Joey Blake 6–2, 6–3

=== Girls' singles ===
(Italy) Laura Garrone defeated (Czechoslovakia) Andrea Holíková 6–2, 7–6

=== Boys' doubles ===
(United States) Joey Blake / (United States) Darren Yates defeated (Australia) Patrick Flynn / (Australia) David Macpherson 3–6, 6–3, 6–4

=== Girls' doubles ===
(Czechoslovakia) Andrea Holíková / (Czechoslovakia) Radka Zrubáková defeated (Argentina) Mariana Perez-Roldan / (Argentina) Patricia Tarabini 6–4, 2–6, 7–5

Preceded by 1985 Wimbledon Championships	Grand Slams	Succeeded by 1985 Australian Open
