= Jason Goodall =

English tennis player and coach

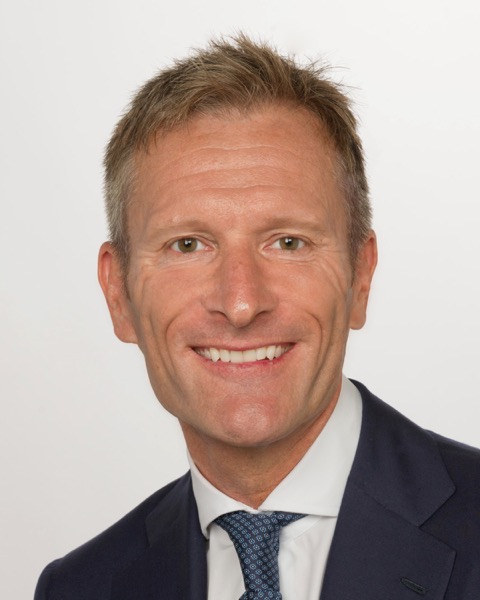
- Country (sports): (United Kingdom) Great Britain
- Residence: Connecticut, US
- Born: 23 January 1967 (age 59) Yorkshire, England
- Height: 6 ft 1 in (185 cm)
- Turned pro: 1984
- Retired: 1990
- Plays: Right-handed
- Prize money: $28,921

Singles
- Career record: 0–5
- Career titles: 0
- Highest ranking: No. 240 (3 April 1989)

Grand Slam singles results
- Australian Open: Q2 (1985, 1987)
- Wimbledon: 1R (1985, 1988)

Doubles
- Career record: 0–7
- Career titles: 0
- Highest ranking: No. 248 (3 April 1989)

Grand Slam doubles results
- Wimbledon: 1R (1986, 1987, 1988, 1989, 1990)

Grand Slam mixed doubles results
- Wimbledon: 1R (1989)

Jason Goodall (born 23 January 1967) is a sports broadcaster, specialising in tennis commentary and analysis. He is a former professional player and currently works in sports media for the likes of ESPN and Tennis Channel as a host and commentator covering various tennis events.

He won two Emmy Awards for his work in his play-by-play role for NBC whilst covering the 2024 Summer Olympics in Paris.

== Early years ==
Goodall started playing tennis in Zambia, Central Africa, when he was nine years old. Upon returning to the United Kingdom three years later he was chosen to represent Great Britain (under-12 level) and continued to do so throughout his junior career up to, and including, under-21 level. He won several National Championships across all junior levels in both singles and doubles, and was a silver medalist in doubles at the under-14 European Championships.

He also went on to compete in all of the junior Grand Slam events on several occasions in both singles and doubles.

== Tour career ==
At age 18 Goodall was given a wildcard entry into the 1985 Wimbledon Championships where he met seventh seed Joakim Nyström in the first round. He was beaten by the Swede in four sets. His only other appearance in the singles draw at Wimbledon was in 1988, when he lost to Italian qualifier Diego Nargiso in straight sets. He participated in the Wimbledon men's doubles championships every year from 1986 to 1990.

Goodall was ranked as high as British number two as a senior and was also national senior doubles champion. He is also a fully qualified coach and has worked with leading tennis players, including Mary Joe Fernandez and Tim Henman. He worked for numerous years for the Lawn Tennis Association in Great Britain with some of the best junior players of the time, and was also Great Britain's Fed Cup coach (now the Billie Jean King Cup).

As a player he was chosen to be part of the British team in two Davis Cup ties in 1989: away against Finland, which Britain won 4–1 and at home against Argentina, which the hosts lost 3–2.
