= 1985 Wimbledon Championships – Men's singles =

Men's singles
- 1985 Wimbledon Championships

Final
- Champion: (West Germany) Boris Becker
- Runner-up: (United States) Kevin Curren
- Score: 6–3, 6–7^{(4–7)}, 7–6^{(7–3)}, 6–4

Details
- Draw: 128 (16Q / 8WC)
- Seeds: 16

Events
Singles	men	women		boys	girls
Doubles	men	women	mixed	boys	girls
WC Singles	men	women	quad
WC Doubles	men	women	quad
Legends	men	women	seniors
- Wimbledon Championships

Boris Becker defeated Kevin Curren in the final, 6–3, 6–7^{(4–7)}, 7–6^{(7–3)}, 6–4 to win the gentlemen's singles tennis title at the 1985 Wimbledon Championships. It was his first major title. He was the first unseeded player and the first German to win the Wimbledon men's singles titles. Becker was 17 years, 227 days and broke the record that Mats Wilander set by winning the 1982 French Open at 17 years, 288 days. Becker still remains the youngest Wimbledon gentlemen's singles champion.

John McEnroe was the two-time defending champion, but lost in the quarterfinals to Curren. This ended McEnroe's streak of five consecutive Wimbledon finals. Curren also defeated Jimmy Connors in the semifinals, becoming the first player to defeat both Connors and McEnroe at the same major.

== Seeds ==
1. (United States) John McEnroe (quarterfinals)
2. (Czechoslovakia) Ivan Lendl (fourth round)
3. (United States) Jimmy Connors (semifinals)
4. (Sweden) Mats Wilander (first round)
5. (Sweden) Anders Järryd (semifinals)
6. (Australia) Pat Cash (second round)
7. (Sweden) Joakim Nyström (third round)
8. (United States) Kevin Curren (final)
9. (United States) Johan Kriek (third round)
10. (United States) Aaron Krickstein (first round)
11. (France) Yannick Noah (third round)
12. (Czechoslovakia) Miloslav Mečíř (first round)
13. (United States) Eliot Teltscher (second round)
14. (Sweden) Stefan Edberg (fourth round)
15. (Czechoslovakia) Tomáš Šmíd (second round)
16. (United States) Tim Mayotte (fourth round)

Click on the seed number of a player to go to their draw section.

== Draw ==
Key

- Q = Qualifier
- WC = Wild card
- LL = Lucky loser
- Alt = Alternate
- ITF = ITF entry
- PR = Protected ranking
- SR = Special ranking
- SE = Special exempt
- JE = Junior exempt
- JR = Junior Accelerator Programme entrant
- CO = College Accelerator Programme entrant
- NG = Next Gen Accelerator Program entrant
- w/o = Walkover
- r = Retired
- d = Defaulted

=== Finals ===
Quarterfinals
1	(United States) John McEnroe	2	2	4
8	(United States) Kevin Curren	6	6	6
3	(United States) Jimmy Connors	6	7	6
Q	(Chile) Ricardo Acuña	1	6	2
5	(Sweden) Anders Järryd	6	6	6
(Switzerland) Heinz Günthardt	4	3	2
(West Germany) Boris Becker	7	3	6	6
(France) Henri Leconte	6	6	3	4

Semifinals
8	(United States) Kevin Curren	6	6	6
3	(United States) Jimmy Connors	2	2	1
5	(Sweden) Anders Järryd	6	6	3	3
(West Germany) Boris Becker	2	7	6	6

Final
8	(United States) Kevin Curren	3	7^{7}	6^{3}	4
(West Germany) Boris Becker	6	6^{4}	7^{7}	6

=== Top half ===
==== Section 1 ====
First round
1	(United States) J McEnroe	6	6	6
WC	(Australia) P McNamara	4	3	4
(Nigeria) N Odizor	6	6	7	6	6
Q	(South Africa) G Muller	7	7	6	3	3
(United Kingdom) S Shaw	4	2	3
(New Zealand) C Lewis	6	6	6
Q	(South Africa) C Steyn	6	6	6
(Brazil) G Barbosa	4	4	2
Q	(West Germany) A Maurer	7	6	7
(Australia) J Frawley	5	3	5
(West Germany) H Schwaier	6	6	6
Q	(United States) R Van't Hof	3	2	4
(Australia) J Fitzgerald	6	7	6
Q	(United States) A Giammalva	4	5	1
(Paraguay) V Pecci	4	0	6	5
9	(United States) J Kriek	6	6	4	7

Second round
1	(United States) J McEnroe	7	6	7
(Nigeria) N Odizor	6	1	6
(New Zealand) C Lewis	6	6	4	4
Q	(South Africa) C Steyn	3	7	6	6
Q	(West Germany) A Maurer	6	7	7
(West Germany) H Schwaier	3	5	5
(Australia) J Fitzgerald	6	6	5	1
9	(United States) J Kriek	3	7	7	6

Third round
1	(United States) J McEnroe	6	7	6
Q	(South Africa) C Steyn	3	5	4
Q	(West Germany) A Maurer	6	6	3	6
9	(United States) J Kriek	1	4	6	4

Fourth round
1	(United States) J McEnroe	6	6	6
Q	(West Germany) A Maurer	0	4	2

==== Section 2 ====
First round
14	(Sweden) S Edberg	6	6	6
(Australia) P Doohan	2	3	4
(Socialist Federal Republic of Yugoslavia) M Ostoja	4	0	6	6
(United States) T Wilkison	6	6	2	7
(Switzerland) J Hlasek	3	6	7	6	5
(United States) T Moor	6	3	6	7	7
(United States) C Hooper	7	7	6
(Hungary) B Taróczy	5	6	3
Q	(New Zealand) D Mustard	7	6	4	6
WC	(United Kingdom) S Bale	6	2	6	4
(United States) M Flur	6	6	6
WC	(United Kingdom) J Bates	4	3	4
(Ecuador) R Viver	3	3	6	3
(United States) M De Palmer	6	6	3	6
(United States) L Stefanki	6	3	4
8	(United States) K Curren	7	6	6

Second round
14	(Sweden) S Edberg	6	7	3	6	9
(United States) T Wilkison	1	5	6	7	7
(United States) T Moor	4	4	5
(United States) C Hooper	6	6	7
Q	(New Zealand) D Mustard	7	6	2	6
(United States) M Flur	6	4	6	4
(United States) M De Palmer	5	7	4	4
8	(United States) K Curren	7	5	6	6

Third round
14	(Sweden) S Edberg	6	6	6
(United States) C Hooper	3	4	4
Q	(New Zealand) D Mustard	3	3	5
8	(United States) K Curren	6	6	7

Fourth round
14	(Sweden) S Edberg	6	3	6
8	(United States) K Curren	7	6	7

==== Section 3 ====
First round
3	(United States) J Connors	6	6	6
(Sweden) S Simonsson	1	3	4
Q	(New Zealand) K Evernden	6	6	6
(Czechoslovakia) J Navrátil	4	4	4
(New Zealand) B Derlin	2	5	6	6
(India) R Krishnan	6	7	4	7
(France) G Forget	6	3	3	4
(United States) L Bourne	3	6	6	6
(United States) L Shiras	6	7	6
WC	(United Kingdom) L Alfred	3	6	3
(United States) B Testerman	3	6	6	6
Q	(Australia) C Miller	6	3	4	2
(United States) S Giammalva	6	6	5	6
Q	(United States) C Cox	0	4	7	4
(New Zealand) R Simpson	4	7	5	6
15	(Czechoslovakia) T Šmíd	6	6	7	7

Second round
3	(United States) J Connors	6	6	6
Q	(New Zealand) K Evernden	3	2	1
(India) R Krishnan	6	7	6
(United States) L Bourne	4	5	2
(United States) L Shiras	4	7	6	1	5
(United States) B Testerman	6	6	4	6	7
(United States) S Giammalva	6	6	6
15	(Czechoslovakia) T Šmíd	3	1	2

Third round
3	(United States) J Connors	7	5	7	6
(India) R Krishnan	5	7	5	2
(United States) B Testerman	6	3	5	6
(United States) S Giammalva	4	6	7	7

Fourth round
3	(United States) J Connors	6	6	6
(United States) S Giammalva	3	4	3

==== Section 4 ====
First round
12	(Czechoslovakia) M Mečíř	6	3	4	7	3
(United States) To Gullikson	4	6	6	6	6
(United States) J Arias	4	4	6	7	5
(United States) J Lapidus	6	6	3	6	7
(Czechoslovakia) M Vajda	7	6	5	2
(United States) M Bauer	5	7	7	6
(United States) R Harmon	4	3	0
Q	(United States) R Seguso	6	6	6
(United States) Ti Gullikson	4	3	6	3
WC	(United States) S Denton	6	6	3	6
(United States) D Pate	6	6	6
WC	(United Kingdom) N Fulwood	3	4	4
(France) T Benhabiles	3	6	1	2
Q	(Chile) R Acuña	6	4	6	6
(United States) T Nelson	6	2	5	7	3
6	(Australia) P Cash	2	6	7	6	6

Second round
(United States) To Gullikson	6	6	6	6	6
(United States) J Lapidus	7	7	4	2	3
(United States) M Bauer	3	4	4
Q	(United States) R Seguso	6	6	6
WC	(United States) S Denton	6	4	4
(United States) D Pate	7	6	6
Q	(Chile) R Acuña	7	6	3	6	6
6	(Australia) P Cash	6	3	6	7	4

Third round
(United States) To Gullikson	6	3	5	2
Q	(United States) R Seguso	4	6	7	6
(United States) D Pate	5	4	2
Q	(Chile) R Acuña	7	6	6

Fourth round
Q	(United States) R Seguso	4	6	2
Q	(Chile) R Acuña	6	7	6

=== Bottom half ===
==== Section 5 ====
First round
5	(Sweden) A Järryd	4	3	6	6	6
(Italy) C Panatta	6	6	4	4	3
(United States) S Davis	6	6	6
Q	(South Africa) B Moir	2	2	3
Q	(France) T Champion	3	4	2
(United States) M Mitchell	6	6	6
(West Germany) P Elter	3	7	5	4
(United States) V Van Patten	6	6	7	6
(West Germany) D Keretić	6	4	7	3
(South Africa) D Visser	7	6	6	6
(United States) M Davis	3	2	6	3
(Sweden) J Gunnarsson	6	6	3	6
(Sweden) H Sundström	3	6	7	4	2
(United States) G Holmes	6	4	6	6	6
(United States) B Schultz	6	3	7	6
10	(United States) A Krickstein	4	6	6	4

Second round
5	(Sweden) A Järryd	5	7	7	6
(United States) S Davis	7	6	5	4
(United States) M Mitchell	5	3	2
(United States) V Van Patten	7	6	6
(South Africa) D Visser	6	6	6	7
(Sweden) J Gunnarsson	7	4	4	6
(United States) G Holmes	6	6	6	6
(United States) B Schultz	4	7	2	3

Third round
5	(Sweden) A Järryd	6	6	6
(United States) V Van Patten	3	3	1
(South Africa) D Visser	6	4	6	6	10
(United States) G Holmes	3	6	7	0	8

Fourth round
5	(Sweden) A Järryd	6	6	6
(South Africa) D Visser	1	4	1

==== Section 6 ====
First round
11	(France) Y Noah	6	3	7	6	6
(United States) B Gilbert	4	6	6	7	3
(South Africa) E Edwards	6	6	6
WC	(United Kingdom) C Dowdeswell	3	3	3
(India) V Amritraj	6	6	6
(United States) J Canter	3	4	4
(Australia) B Drewett	7	7	6
(United States) S McCain	6	5	4
(United States) V Gerulaitis	6	5	6	3	6
(United States) P Fleming	2	7	4	6	3
(Brazil) C Motta	3	2	3
(United States) J Sadri	6	6	6
(United States) B Teacher	4	5	7	2
(Switzerland) H Günthardt	6	7	6	6
(Socialist Federal Republic of Yugoslavia) S Živojinović	6	5	7	6
4	(Sweden) M Wilander	2	7	5	0

Second round
11	(France) Y Noah	4	6	7	6
(South Africa) E Edwards	6	4	6	2
(India) V Amritraj	7	6	7	7
(Australia) B Drewett	6	7	6	5
(United States) V Gerulaitis	5	6	3	7	6
(United States) J Sadri	7	4	6	6	4
(Switzerland) H Günthardt	6	4	4	6	6
(Socialist Federal Republic of Yugoslavia) S Živojinović	4	6	6	3	4

Third round
11	(France) Y Noah	6	6	3	6
(India) V Amritraj	4	7	6	7
(United States) V Gerulaitis	3	7	1	6	5
(Switzerland) H Günthardt	6	6	6	3	7

Fourth round
(India) V Amritraj	4	4	1
(Switzerland) H Günthardt	6	6	6

==== Section 7 ====
First round
7	(Sweden) J Nyström	6	6	3	6
WC	(United Kingdom) J Goodall	3	3	6	0
(United States) D Goldie	7	5	1	6	7
(United States) P Annacone	5	7	6	1	9
Q	(United States) M Anger	5	6	6	3	6
(Hungary) Z Kuhárszky	7	2	2	6	1
(West Germany) B Becker	4	6	6	6
(United States) H Pfister	6	3	2	4
(Australia) P McNamee	6	6	7
(United States) S Meister	2	4	6
(United States) R Green	3	2	4
Q	(Argentina) R Saad	6	6	6
(Czechoslovakia) P Složil	3	7	1	6
(United States) K Flach	6	6	6	7
(Australia) T Allan	5	4	2
16	(United States) T Mayotte	7	6	6

Second round
7	(Sweden) J Nyström	7	7	6
(United States) P Annacone	5	5	3
Q	(United States) M Anger	0	1	3
(West Germany) B Becker	6	6	6
(Australia) P McNamee	6	7	7
Q	(Argentina) R Saad	3	6	6
(United States) K Flach	4	4	4
16	(United States) T Mayotte	6	6	6

Third round
7	(Sweden) J Nyström	6	6	1	6	7
(West Germany) B Becker	3	7	6	4	9
(Australia) P McNamee	6	6	6	2	0
16	(United States) T Mayotte	3	4	7	6	6

Fourth round
(West Germany) B Becker	6	4	6	7	6
16	(United States) T Mayotte	3	6	7	6	2

==== Section 8 ====
First round
13	(United States) E Teltscher	5	7	7	6
(Italy) G Ocleppo	7	6	6	0
(United Kingdom) J Lloyd	6	6	7
(West Germany) W Popp	2	4	6
(France) H Leconte	6	7	7
Q	(United States) C Dunk	3	6	6
(Australia) W Masur	7	7	6
(United States) D Cassidy	6	6	1
(Spain) J López-Maeso	6	3	1
(Israel) S Glickstein	7	6	6
(Australia) M Edmondson	3	2	6
(Paraguay) F González	6	6	7
(Poland) W Fibak	6	4	1
(United States) M Leach	7	6	6
(United States) M Purcell	4	6	6
2	(Czechoslovakia) I Lendl	6	7	7

Second round
13	(United States) E Teltscher	3	4	6	6	5
(United Kingdom) J Lloyd	6	6	4	3	7
(France) H Leconte	4	6	7	6
(Australia) W Masur	6	4	6	3
(Israel) S Glickstein	6	6	3	7
(Paraguay) F González	3	4	6	5
(United States) M Leach	3	6	2	7	4
2	(Czechoslovakia) I Lendl	6	1	6	6	6

Third round
(United Kingdom) J Lloyd	7	3	4	4
(France) H Leconte	5	6	6	6
(Israel) S Glickstein	6	6	3	2
2	(Czechoslovakia) I Lendl	7	4	6	6

Fourth round
(France) H Leconte	3	6	6	6
2	(Czechoslovakia) I Lendl	6	4	3	1

Preceded by 1985 French Open	Grand Slams; Men's Singles	Succeeded by 1985 US Open
