= Andrea Holíková =

Czechoslovak tennis player

- Country (sports): (Czech Republic) Czechoslovakia
- Born: 15 January 1968 (age 57); Prague, Czechoslovakia
- Turned pro: 1985
- Retired: 1991
- Prize money: US$163,601

Singles
- Career record: 100–105
- Career titles: 0 WTA, 1 ITF
- Highest ranking: 67 (October 1985)

Grand Slam singles results
- Australian Open: 3R (1987)
- French Open: 2R (1985, 1986, 1988)
- Wimbledon: 3R (1985, 1986)
- US Open: 3R (1985)

Doubles
- Career record: 35–54
- Career titles: 0 WTA, 1 ITF
- Highest ranking: 99 (21 December 1986)

Grand Slam doubles results
- Australian Open: 1R (1985, 1987)
- French Open: QF (1985)
- Wimbledon: 2R (1986)
- US Open: 3R (1986)

Andrea Holíková (born 15 January 1968) is a former Czechoslovak tennis player. She comes from the family of successful hockey players – she is the daughter Jaroslav Holík, the elder sister of Bobby Holík, and the niece of Jiří Holík. Holíková is married to former hockey player František "Frank" Musil.

Holíková was a very successful junior player. In 1985, she won the Wimbledon Championships and reached the final of the US Open. In doubles, Holíková and Radka Zrubáková were the finalists of the French Open, but collected the US Open title. Holíková's professional career was by far less successful. Her highest ranking positions were World No. 67 in singles and World No. 99 in doubles. Her best result in Grand Slam tournaments was the doubles quarterfinals at the 1985 French Open. Holíková did, however, defeat two top ten players, Kathy Rinaldi and Brenda Schultz. At the Spanish Open qualifications in 1985, she defeated then 13-year–old Arantxa Sánchez Vicario, future World No. 1 player.

Holíková won two ITF Circuit titles, one in singles and one in doubles. She also reached two Virginia Slims doubles finals, but never triumphed. Holíková has not competed professionally since 1990. She played her last singles match at the Bausch and Lomb Championships in April 1990, losing to Silvia Farina Elia 6–4, 6–3.

== Personal life ==
Holíková is the daughter of former ice hockey player Jaroslav Holík, who won the bronze medal at the 1972 Winter Olympics. Her younger brother and paternal uncle also professionally played hockey – Bobby Holík won the gold medal at the 1990 World Championships, while Jiří Holík also professionally played hockey, who won silver medals at the 1968 and 1976 Winter Olympics, and bronze medals at the 1964 and 1972 Winter Olympics. Holíková is married to former professional ice hockey player František "Frank" Musil, who won the gold medal at the 1985 World Championships. They have three children.

Holikova's son, David, was drafted in the 2nd round of the 2011 entry draft by the Edmonton Oilers of the National Hockey League (NHL), and younger son Adam was drafted in the 4th round of the 2015 draft by the St. Louis Blues.

== Senior career highlights ==
Upset Kathy Rinaldi and gained third round of 1985 at US Open. Won first tournament of 1985 and her first pro title at the USTA Circuit at Key Biscayne, Florida; beat Kris Kinney in the final; reached the semifinals in the doubles draw. Ranked in the top 10 in Czechoslovakia for two years. Has career wins over Kathy Rinaldi, Pam Casale, Ginny Purdy, Barbara Jordan, Petra Jauch-Delhees, and Lilian Drescher. She was coached by Vladislav Savrda.

== Career statistics ==
=== Virginia Slims doubles finals (0–2) ===
Result	W-L	Date	Tournament	Surface	Partner	Opponents	Result
Loss	0–1	Jul 1985	Bregenz Austria	Clay	(Czechoslovakia) Kateřina Böhmová	(Socialist Federal Republic of Yugoslavia) Mima Jaušovec (Romania) Virginia Ruzici	2–6, 3–6
Loss	0–2	Aug 1985	Monticello, the United States	Hard	(Czechoslovakia) Kateřina Böhmová	(Argentina) Mercedes Paz (Argentina) Gabriela Sabatini	7–5, 4–6, 3–6

=== ITF Circuit singles finals (1–1) ===
$100,000 tournaments
$75,000 tournaments
$50,000 tournaments
$25,000 tournaments
$10,000 tournaments

Outcome	No.	Date	Tournament	Surface	Opponent	Result
Loss	1.	13 October 1984	Sofia, Bulgaria	Clay	(Czechoslovakia) Regina Maršíková	6–1, 6–4
Win	1.	12 January 1985	Key Biscayne, the United States	Hard	(United States) Kris Kinney	7–5, 6–3

=== ITF Circuit doubles finals (1–0) ===
$100,000 tournaments
$75,000 tournaments
$50,000 tournaments
$25,000 tournaments
$10,000 tournaments

Result	No.	Date	Tournament	Surface	Partner	Opponents	Result
Win	1.	25 August 1984	Rheda-Wiedenbrück, West Germany	Clay	(Czechoslovakia) Olga Votavová	(Argentina) Andrea Tiezzi (Argentina) Isabelle Villaverde	7–5, 6–4

=== Junior Grand Slam singles finals (1–1) ===
Result	Year	Tournament	Surface	Opponent	Result
Win	1985	Wimbledon Championships	Grass	(Australia) Jenny Byrne	7–5, 6–1
Loss	1985	US Open	Hard	(Italy) Laura Garrone	2–6, 6–7^{(0–7)}

=== Junior Grand Slam doubles finals (1–1) ===
Result	Year	Tournament	Surface	Partner	Opponents	Result
Loss	1985	French Open	Clay	(Czechoslovakia) Radka Zrubáková	(Argentina) Mariana Pérez Roldán (Argentina) Patricia Tarabini	3–6, 7–5, 4–6
Win	1985	US Open	Hard	(Czechoslovakia) Radka Zrubáková	(Argentina) Mariana Pérez Roldán (Argentina) Patricia Tarabini	6–4, 2–6, 7–5
