= 1985 Wimbledon Championships – Women's singles =

Women's singles
- 1985 Wimbledon Championships

Final
- Champion: (United States) Martina Navratilova
- Runner-up: (United States) Chris Evert Lloyd
- Score: 4–6, 6–3, 6–2

Details
- Draw: 128 (8 Q / 8 WC )
- Seeds: 16

Events
Singles	men	women		boys	girls
Doubles	men	women	mixed	boys	girls
WC Singles	men	women	quad
WC Doubles	men	women	quad
Legends	men	women	seniors
← 1984 ·	Wimbledon Championships	· 1986 →

Three-time defending champion Martina Navratilova defeated Chris Evert Lloyd in a rematch of the previous year's final, 4–6, 6–3, 6–2 to win the ladies' singles tennis title at the 1985 Wimbledon Championships. It was her sixth Wimbledon singles title and twelfth major singles title overall. It marked Evert's seventh runner-up finish at Wimbledon, the joint-most at a major (shared with Blanche Bingley, also at Wimbledon).

== Seeds ==
1. (United States) Chris Evert Lloyd (final)
1. (United States) Martina Navratilova (champion)
2. n/a
3. (Czechoslovakia) Hana Mandlíková (third round)
4. (Bulgaria) Manuela Maleeva (fourth round)
5. (United States) Pam Shriver (quarterfinals)
6. (West Germany) Claudia Kohde-Kilsch (second round)
7. (Czechoslovakia) Helena Suková (quarterfinals)
8. (United States) Zina Garrison (semifinals)
9. (United States) Bonnie Gadusek (second round)
10. (United States) Kathy Jordan (second round)
11. (West Germany) Steffi Graf (fourth round)
12. (Sweden) Catarina Lindqvist (first round)
13. (Canada) Carling Bassett (second round)
14. (Australia) Wendy Turnbull (third round)
15. (Argentina) Gabriela Sabatini (third round)
16. (United States) Kathy Rinaldi (semifinals)

Click on the seed number of a player to go to their draw section.

Both Chris Evert Lloyd and Martina Navratilova were seeded #1, reflecting Evert Lloyd's status as the #1 ranked player and Navratilova's as the 3-time defending champion, with no seed #2 awarded. This unique decision was heavily criticised by the Women's Tennis Association. As Evert Lloyd was placed at the top of the draw sheet, she was in effect the de facto #1.

== Draw ==
=== Key ===
- Q = Qualifier
- WC = Wild card
- LL = Lucky loser
- Alt = Alternate
- ITF = ITF entry
- PR = Protected ranking
- SR = Special ranking
- SE = Special exempt
- JE = Junior exempt
- JR = Junior Accelerator Programme entrant
- CO = College Accelerator Programme entrant
- NG = Next Gen Accelerator Program entrant
- w/o = Walkover
- r = Retired
- d = Defaulted

=== Finals ===
Quarterfinals
1	(United States) Chris Evert Lloyd	6	6
(United States) Barbara Potter	2	1
16	(United States) Kathy Rinaldi	6	1	6
7	(Czechoslovakia) Helena Suková	1	6	1
8	(United States) Zina Garrison	2	6	6
Q	(United States) Molly Van Nostrand	6	3	0
5	(United States) Pam Shriver	6	3
1	(United States) Martina Navratilova	7	6

Semifinals
1	(United States) Chris Evert Lloyd	6	6
16	(United States) Kathy Rinaldi	2	0
8	(United States) Zina Garrison	4	6
1	(United States) Martina Navratilova	6	7

Final
1	(United States) Chris Evert Lloyd	6	3	2
1	(United States) Martina Navratilova	4	6	6

=== Top half ===
==== Section 1 ====
First round
1	(United States) C Evert Lloyd	6	6
(United States) M-L Piatek	1	0
(United States) S Mascarin	7	3	6
(Denmark) T Scheuer-Larsen	6	6	3
Q	(Australia) J Byrne	6	6
(France) S Amiach	2	3
(South Africa) Y Vermaak	6	6
(Socialist Federal Republic of Yugoslavia) M Jaušovec	3	4
(Czechoslovakia) M Skuherská	1	2
(Switzerland) L Drescher	6	6
Q	(United States) B Jordan	1	4
(France) I Demongeot	6	6
WC	(United States) A Smith	6	6
(United States) V Nelson	0	2
(United States) H Ludloff	1	1
9	(United States) B Gadusek	6	6

Second round
1	(United States) C Evert Lloyd	6	6
(United States) S Mascarin	3	0
Q	(Australia) J Byrne	6	6
(South Africa) Y Vermaak	2	3
(Switzerland) L Drescher	4	3
(France) I Demongeot	6	6
WC	(United States) A Smith	2	6	6
9	(United States) B Gadusek	6	4	2

Third round
1	(United States) C Evert Lloyd	6	6
Q	(Australia) J Byrne	2	1
(France) I Demongeot	2	4
WC	(United States) A Smith	6	6

Fourth round
1	(United States) C Evert Lloyd	6	6
WC	(United States) A Smith	0	4

==== Section 2 ====
First round
12	(Sweden) C Lindqvist	0	5
(United States) B Potter	6	7
(South Africa) B Mould	7	6	3
(United Kingdom) S Gomer	6	7	6
Q	(United States) P Fendick	6	6
(United States) M Brown	4	1
(United States) K Cummings	6	6
WC	(United Kingdom) K Brasher	3	4
(United States) E Burgin	7	6
(Brazil) P Medrado	6	2
(Argentina) A Villagrán	6	6	6
(United States) J Klitch	7	4	3
(United States) K Shaefer	3	2
(United Kingdom) J Durie	6	6
(United States) E Nagelsen	5	1
6	(West Germany) C Kohde-Kilsch	7	6

Second round
(United States) B Potter	6	7
(United Kingdom) S Gomer	4	5
Q	(United States) P Fendick	6	6
(United States) K Cummings	1	3
(United States) E Burgin	6	6
(Argentina) A Villagrán	0	3
(United Kingdom) J Durie	4	6	6
6	(West Germany) C Kohde-Kilsch	6	1	2

Third round
(United States) B Potter	7	6
Q	(United States) P Fendick	6	1
(United States) E Burgin	5	5
(United Kingdom) J Durie	7	7

Fourth round
(United States) B Potter	7	6	6
(United Kingdom) J Durie	6	7	1

==== Section 3 ====
First round
3	(Czechoslovakia) H Mandlíková	6	6
(Czechoslovakia) I Budařová	0	1
(Brazil) N Dias	0	2
(Australia) D Balestrat	6	6
(United States) J Russell	5	6	6
(West Germany) P Keppeler	7	2	1
(Australia) E Smylie	6	6
(United States) A Leand	1	2
(United States) E Herr	3	4
(United States) A Moulton	6	6
WC	(United Kingdom) R Einy	3	7	4
WC	(United Kingdom) S Reeves	6	5	6
(West Germany) M Schropp	5	4
(South Africa) R Fairbank	7	6
Q	(West Germany) A Betzner	3	5
16	(United States) K Rinaldi	6	7

Second round
3	(Czechoslovakia) H Mandlíková	4	6	7
(Australia) D Balestrat	6	2	5
(United States) J Russell	4	4
(Australia) E Smylie	6	6
(United States) A Moulton	6	6
WC	(United Kingdom) S Reeves	2	4
(South Africa) R Fairbank	5	4
16	(United States) K Rinaldi	7	6

Third round
3	(Czechoslovakia) H Mandlíková	1	6
(Australia) E Smylie	6	7
(United States) A Moulton	6	4
16	(United States) K Rinaldi	7	6

Fourth round
(Australia) E Smylie	2	1
16	(United States) K Rinaldi	6	6

==== Section 4 ====
First round
14	(Australia) W Turnbull	7	6
(United States) G Rush	5	3
(Japan) M Yanagi	3	3
(Australia) E Minter	6	6
(West Germany) S Hanika	6	6
(France) C Suire	4	2
(Japan) E Okagawa	2	1
(France) P Paradis	6	6
WC	(United Kingdom) C Wood	1	5
(United States) A Henricksson	6	7
LL	(United States) K Kinney	3	6	4
(United States) W White	6	2	6
(United States) A Holton	6	4	5
(Romania) V Ruzici	4	6	7
(Sweden) C Jexell	3	3
7	(Czechoslovakia) H Suková	6	6

Second round
14	(Australia) W Turnbull	7	7
(Australia) E Minter	5	5
(West Germany) S Hanika	6	7	3
(France) P Paradis	7	6	6
(United States) A Henricksson	4	6	4
(United States) W White	6	2	6
(Romania) V Ruzici	1	4
7	(Czechoslovakia) H Suková	6	6

Third round
14	(Australia) W Turnbull	6	5	1
(France) P Paradis	2	7	6
(United States) W White	1	4
7	(Czechoslovakia) H Suková	6	6

Fourth round
(France) P Paradis	4	6
7	(Czechoslovakia) H Suková	6	7

=== Bottom half ===
==== Section 5 ====
First round
8	(United States) Z Garrison	6	6
Q	(South Africa) E Reinach	2	1
(Czechoslovakia) K Skronská	3	3
(United States) T Phelps	6	6
(United States) P Casale	7	1	3
(Czechoslovakia) A Holíková	5	6	6
(United States) K Gompert	3	6	4
(Netherlands) M Mesker	6	4	6
(United States) M Gurney	7	6
(Australia) S Leo	5	4
(Canada) M Groat	3	2
(France) C Tanvier	6	6
(United States) C Benjamin	6	6
(Soviet Union) E Eliseenko	4	0
(United Kingdom) A Brown	6	3	3
15	(Argentina) G Sabatini	3	6	6

Second round
8	(United States) Z Garrison	6	6
(United States) T Phelps	3	1
(Czechoslovakia) A Holíková	2	7	3
(Netherlands) M Mesker	6	6	6
(United States) M Gurney	3	4
(France) C Tanvier	6	6
(United States) C Benjamin	3	4
15	(Argentina) G Sabatini	6	6

Third round
8	(United States) Z Garrison	6	6
(Netherlands) M Mesker	3	1
(France) C Tanvier	6	6	6
15	(Argentina) G Sabatini	7	4	1

Fourth round
8	(United States) Z Garrison	6	6
(France) C Tanvier	1	3

==== Section 6 ====
First round
10	(United States) K Jordan	6	6
WC	(United Kingdom) J Tacon	0	2
(Soviet Union) L Savchenko	6	4	6
(Socialist Federal Republic of Yugoslavia) S Goleš	1	6	3
(United States) S Walsh-Pete	5	3
Q	(United States) M Van Nostrand	7	6
(United States) M Louie	6	6
(Canada) H Kelesi	2	4
(West Germany) E Pfaff	6	6
(United States) S Foltz	3	3
(United States) S Collins	2	2
(United States) R White	6	6
(Australia) J Thompson	1	3
(United States) T Holladay	6	6
(United States) M Washington	0	1
4	(Bulgaria) M Maleeva	6	6

Second round
10	(United States) K Jordan	5	6	3
(Soviet Union) L Savchenko	7	3	6
Q	(United States) M Van Nostrand	6	6
(United States) M Louie	2	3
(West Germany) E Pfaff	3	2
(United States) R White	6	6
(United States) T Holladay	7	1	4
4	(Bulgaria) M Maleeva	6	6	6

Third round
(Soviet Union) L Savchenko	6	6	5
Q	(United States) M Van Nostrand	7	3	7
(United States) R White	3	3
4	(Bulgaria) M Maleeva	6	6

Fourth round
Q	(United States) M Van Nostrand	7	6
4	(Bulgaria) M Maleeva	5	2

==== Section 7 ====
First round
5	(United States) P Shriver	6	6	6
(United States) A White	3	7	3
(United Kingdom) A Hobbs	6	6
(United States) G Kim	4	2
(France) C Vanier	3	2
(United States) B Gerken	6	6
(United States) L Antonoplis	4	5
(United Kingdom) V Wade	6	7
(Japan) E Inoue	6	6
Q	(Sweden) E Ekblom	2	1
(United States) S Rehe	6	6
(Switzerland) C Jolissaint	4	3
(Hungary) A Temesvári	3	7	6
(Bulgaria) K Maleeva	6	6	4
(United States) L Spain-Short	7	4	2
11	(West Germany) S Graf	6	6	6

Second round
5	(United States) P Shriver	6	6
(United Kingdom) A Hobbs	3	2
(United States) B Gerken	3	7	5
(United Kingdom) V Wade	6	6	7
(Japan) E Inoue	1	3
(United States) S Rehe	6	6
(Hungary) A Temesvári	3	6
11	(West Germany) S Graf	6	7

Third round
5	(United States) P Shriver	6	5	6
(United Kingdom) V Wade	2	7	2
(United States) S Rehe	3	2
11	(West Germany) S Graf	6	6

Fourth round
5	(United States) P Shriver	3	6	6
11	(West Germany) S Graf	6	2	4

==== Section 8 ====
First round
13	(Canada) C Bassett	6	3	6
(Argentina) M Paz	0	6	3
(South Africa) R Uys	7	4	6
WC	(United Kingdom) J Louis	6	6	2
Q	(United States) N Hu	6	7
(United Kingdom) A Croft	3	5
(Sweden) C Karlsson	6	4	3
LL	(Czechoslovakia) L Plchová	2	6	6
(Italy) A-M Cecchini	7	6
WC	(United Kingdom) J Salmon	6	1
(West Germany) B Bunge	6	6
(United States) L McNeil	3	3
(Australia) A Minter	6	6
(Peru) P Vásquez	0	2
(United States) L Bonder	0	2
1	(United States) M Navratilova	6	6

Second round
13	(Canada) C Bassett	6	6	3
(South Africa) R Uys	0	7	6
Q	(United States) N Hu	7	6
LL	(Czechoslovakia) L Plchová	5	4
(Italy) A-M Cecchini	3	2
(West Germany) B Bunge	6	6
(Australia) A Minter	4	1
1	(United States) M Navratilova	6	6

Third round
(South Africa) R Uys	6	4	6
Q	(United States) N Hu	2	6	0
(West Germany) B Bunge	6	3
1	(United States) M Navratilova	7	6

Fourth round
(South Africa) R Uys	2	2
1	(United States) M Navratilova	6	6

== See also ==
- Evert–Navratilova rivalry

Preceded by 1985 French Open – Women's singles	Grand Slam women's singles	Succeeded by 1985 US Open – Women's singles
