= John Boytim =

American tennis player

- Country (sports): United States
- Born: December 21, 1967 (age 58) New Orleans, U.S.
- Height: 5 ft 9 in (175 cm)
- Prize money: $13,383

Singles
- Career record: 0–4
- Highest ranking: No. 267 (Aug 1, 1988)

Grand Slam singles results
- US Open: 1R (1989)

John Boytim (born December 21, 1967) is an American former professional tennis player.

Born in New Orleans, Boytim was runner-up to Buff Farrow at the United States Amateur Championships in 1986 and played on the University of Georgia's 1987 NCAA Division I Championship winning team.

Boytim turned professional in 1987 and reached a best career ranking of 267 in the world. He qualified for the main draw of the 1989 US Open, where he lost his first round match in five sets to MaliVai Washington.
