= 1985 Wimbledon Championships – Women's doubles =

Women's doubles
- 1985 Wimbledon Championships

Final
- Champions: (United States) Kathy Jordan (Australia) Elizabeth Smylie
- Runners-up: (United States) Martina Navratilova (United States) Pam Shriver
- Score: 5–7, 6–3, 6–4

Details
- Draw: 64 (4Q)
- Seeds: 16

Events
Singles	men	women		boys	girls
Doubles	men	women	mixed	boys	girls
WC Singles	men	women	quad
WC Doubles	men	women	quad
Legends	men	women	seniors
- Wimbledon Championships

Kathy Jordan and Elizabeth Smylie defeated the four-time defending champions Martina Navratilova and Pam Shriver in the final, 5–7, 6–3, 6–4 to win the ladies' doubles tennis title at the 1985 Wimbledon Championships.

The result ended Navratilova and Shriver's 109-match streak in doubles (started in April 1983), which made them win 22 consecutive titles across three seasons.

== Seeds ==
1. (United States) Martina Navratilova / (United States) Pam Shriver (final)
2. (West Germany) Claudia Kohde-Kilsch / (Czechoslovakia) Helena Suková (semifinals)
3. (United States) Kathy Jordan / (Australia) Elizabeth Smylie (champions)
4. (Czechoslovakia) Hana Mandlíková / (Australia) Wendy Turnbull (semifinals)
5. (United States) Barbara Potter / (United States) Sharon Walsh-Pete (quarterfinals)
6. (Soviet Union) Svetlana Cherneva / (Soviet Union) Larisa Savchenko (quarterfinals)
7. (West Germany) Bettina Bunge / (West Germany) Eva Pfaff (third round)
8. (South Africa) Rosalyn Fairbank / (United Kingdom) Anne Hobbs (first round)
9. (United States) Betsy Nagelsen / (United States) Anne White (third round)
10. (United Kingdom) Jo Durie / (United States) Chris Evert Lloyd (quarterfinals)
11. (United States) Elise Burgin / (United States) Alycia Moulton (third round)
12. (United States) Lea Antonoplis / (United States) Candy Reynolds (first round)
13. (Puerto Rico) Gigi Fernández / (United States) JoAnne Russell (withdrew)
14. (Romania) Virginia Ruzici / (Hungary) Andrea Temesvári (quarterfinals)
15. (Canada) Carling Bassett / (United States) Andrea Leand (second round)
16. (South Africa) Beverly Mould / (United States) Paula Smith (third round)

Click on the seed number of a player to go to their draw section.

== Draw ==
Key

- Q = Qualifier
- WC = Wild card
- LL = Lucky loser
- Alt = Alternate
- ITF = ITF entry
- PR = Protected ranking
- SR = Special ranking
- SE = Special exempt
- JE = Junior exempt
- JR = Junior Accelerator Programme entrant
- CO = College Accelerator Programme entrant
- NG = Next Gen Accelerator Program entrant
- w/o = Walkover
- r = Retired
- d = Defaulted

=== Finals ===
Quarterfinals
1	(United States) Martina Navratilova (United States) Pam Shriver	7	6
10	(United Kingdom) Jo Durie (United States) Chris Evert Lloyd	6	1
4	(Czechoslovakia) Hana Mandlíková (Australia) Wendy Turnbull	6	6
6	(Soviet Union) Svetlana Cherneva (Soviet Union) Larisa Savchenko	4	3
14	(Romania) Virginia Ruzici (Hungary) Andrea Temesvári	2	6
3	(United States) Kathy Jordan (Australia) Elizabeth Smylie	6	7
5	(United States) Barbara Potter (United States) Sharon Walsh-Pete	6	6	3
2	(West Germany) Claudia Kohde-Kilsch (Czechoslovakia) Helena Suková	7	4	6

Semifinals
1	(United States) Martina Navratilova (United States) Pam Shriver	6	6
4	(Czechoslovakia) Hana Mandlíková (Australia) Wendy Turnbull	4	2
3	(United States) Kathy Jordan (Australia) Elizabeth Smylie	5	6	7
2	(West Germany) Claudia Kohde-Kilsch (Czechoslovakia) Helena Suková	7	1	5

Final
1	(United States) Martina Navratilova (United States) Pam Shriver	7	3	4
3	(United States) Kathy Jordan (Australia) Elizabeth Smylie	5	6	6

=== Top half ===
==== Section 1 ====
First round
1	(United States) M Navratilova (United States) P Shriver	6	6
(United States) J Golder (United States) V Nelson	1	0
(United Kingdom) B Borneo (United Kingdom) J Tacon	6	3	6
Q	(United States) A-M Fernandez (United States) N Hu	4	6	4
(United States) Z Garrison (United States) K Rinaldi	7	6
(United Kingdom) A Brown (South Africa) R Uys	5	1
(United States) T Holladay (Socialist Federal Republic of Yugoslavia) M Jaušovec	6	6
Alt	(Switzerland) C Jolissaint (Netherlands) M Mesker	2	4
10	(United Kingdom) J Durie (United States) C Evert Lloyd	6	6
(Poland) I Kuczyńska (Canada) H Pelletier	2	4
(United States) R Casals (South Africa) I Kloss	6	4	4
(France) S Amiach (United States) B Gerken	4	6	6
(United States) K Copeland (United States) T Mochizuki	3	3
(Brazil) N Dias (Brazil) P Medrado	6	6
(Australia) A Minter (Australia) E Minter	6	6	6
7	(West Germany) B Bunge (West Germany) E Pfaff	4	7	8

Second round
1	(United States) M Navratilova (United States) P Shriver	6	6
(United Kingdom) B Borneo (United Kingdom) J Tacon	1	2
(United States) Z Garrison (United States) K Rinaldi	2	6	4
(United States) T Holladay (Socialist Federal Republic of Yugoslavia) M Jaušovec	6	2	6
10	(United Kingdom) J Durie (United States) C Evert Lloyd	6	6
(France) S Amiach (United States) B Gerken	4	3
(Brazil) N Dias (Brazil) P Medrado	7	5	1
7	(West Germany) B Bunge (West Germany) E Pfaff	6	7	6

Third round
1	(United States) M Navratilova (United States) P Shriver	6	6
(United States) T Holladay (Socialist Federal Republic of Yugoslavia) M Jaušovec	0	3
10	(United Kingdom) J Durie (United States) C Evert Lloyd	5	6	6
7	(West Germany) B Bunge (West Germany) E Pfaff	7	4	4

Quarterfinals
1	(United States) M Navratilova (United States) P Shriver	7	6
10	(United Kingdom) J Durie (United States) C Evert Lloyd	6	1

==== Section 2 ====
First round
4	(Czechoslovakia) H Mandlíková (Australia) W Turnbull	6	6
(Italy) A-M Cecchini (West Germany) M Schropp	3	3
(United States) P Fendick (United States) H Ludloff	7	5	6
(United Kingdom) R Einy (United Kingdom) L Gracie	5	7	3
(France) C Suire (United Kingdom) V Wade	6	6
(United States) K Kinney (Australia) P Whytcross	4	2
(West Germany) S Graf (United States) A Smith	1	3
11	(United States) E Burgin (United States) A Moulton	6	6
15	(Canada) C Bassett (United States) A Leand	6	3	6
(United Kingdom) S Gomer (United Kingdom) J Salmon	3	6	3
(Japan) E Okagawa (United States) S Schenck	3	3
(France) I Demongeot (France) N Tauziat	6	6
Q	(United States) K McDaniel (United States) W White	7	6
(United States) H Crowe (United States) K Steinmetz	6	2
(United States) L McNeil (United States) K Sands	0	0
6	(Soviet Union) S Cherneva (Soviet Union) L Savchenko	6	6

Second round
4	(Czechoslovakia) H Mandlíková (Australia) W Turnbull	6	7
(United States) P Fendick (United States) H Ludloff	3	6
(France) C Suire (United Kingdom) V Wade	2	3
11	(United States) E Burgin (United States) A Moulton	6	6
15	(Canada) C Bassett (United States) A Leand	7	0	9
(France) I Demongeot (France) N Tauziat	6	6	11
Q	(United States) K McDaniel (United States) W White	1	2
6	(Soviet Union) S Cherneva (Soviet Union) L Savchenko	6	6

Third round
4	(Czechoslovakia) H Mandlíková (Australia) W Turnbull	6	6
11	(United States) E Burgin (United States) A Moulton	1	2
(France) I Demongeot (France) N Tauziat	6	6	2
6	(Soviet Union) S Cherneva (Soviet Union) L Savchenko	4	7	6

Quarterfinals
4	(Czechoslovakia) H Mandlíková (Australia) W Turnbull	6	6
6	(Soviet Union) S Cherneva (Soviet Union) L Savchenko	4	3

=== Bottom half ===
==== Section 3 ====
First round
8	(South Africa) R Fairbank (United Kingdom) A Hobbs	3	1
(France) P Paradis (France) C Tanvier	6	6
(United States) P Barg (Argentina) A Villagrán	7	4	3
(Canada) J Hetherington (United States) G Rush	5	6	6
(United States) J Klitch (France) C Vanier	5	3
(Czechoslovakia) I Budařová (Czechoslovakia) M Skuherská	7	6
(United States) S Mascarin (United States) T Phelps	4	3
14	(Romania) V Ruzici (Hungary) A Temesvári	6	6
12	(United States) L Antonoplis (United States) C Reynolds	0	2
(Brazil) C Monteiro (South Africa) Y Vermaak	6	6
(United States) B Jordan (United States) N Yeargin	0	1
(South Africa) J Mundel (United States) M Van Nostrand	6	6
(United States) S Foltz (United States) R Reis	1	2
(Sweden) C Karlsson (Denmark) T Scheuer-Larsen	6	6
Q	(United States) R Blount (United States) D Farrell	1	1
3	(United States) K Jordan (Australia) E Smylie	6	6

Second round
(France) P Paradis (France) C Tanvier	6	6
(Canada) J Hetherington (United States) G Rush	4	2
(Czechoslovakia) I Budařová (Czechoslovakia) M Skuherská	2	1
14	(Romania) V Ruzici (Hungary) A Temesvári	6	6
(Brazil) C Monteiro (South Africa) Y Vermaak	6	3	6
(South Africa) J Mundel (United States) M Van Nostrand	4	6	4
(Sweden) C Karlsson (Denmark) T Scheuer-Larsen	3	1
3	(United States) K Jordan (Australia) E Smylie	6	6

Third round
(France) P Paradis (France) C Tanvier	6	4	4
14	(Romania) V Ruzici (Hungary) A Temesvári	0	6	6
(Brazil) C Monteiro (South Africa) Y Vermaak	1	0
3	(United States) K Jordan (Australia) E Smylie	6	6

Quarterfinals
14	(Romania) V Ruzici (Hungary) A Temesvári	2	6
3	(United States) K Jordan (Australia) E Smylie	6	7

==== Section 4 ====
First round
5	(United States) B Potter (United States) S Walsh-Pete	6	6	7
Q	(New Zealand) B Cordwell (New Zealand) J Richardson	3	7	5
(United States) M-L Piatek (United States) R White	6	7
(Australia) B Remilton (Japan) N Sato	2	6
(Bulgaria) K Maleeva (Bulgaria) M Maleeva	7	2	4
(Argentina) M Paz (Argentina) G Sabatini	5	6	6
(United States) S Collins (Socialist Federal Republic of Yugoslavia) S Goleš	2	4
16	(South Africa) B Mould (United States) P Smith	6	6
9	(United States) E Nagelsen (United States) A White	7	7
(United States) E Herr (United States) K Shaefer	5	5
(United States) C Benjamin (United States) J Kaplan	0	7	6
(United States) P Casale (United States) M Louie	6	5	2
(United Kingdom) A Croft (United States) L Howell	3	5
(United States) A Henricksson (Australia) S Leo	6	7
(United States) A Holton (United States) M Quinlan	0	4
2	(West Germany) C Kohde-Kilsch (Czechoslovakia) H Suková	6	6

Second round
5	(United States) B Potter (United States) S Walsh-Pete	6	6
(United States) M-L Piatek (United States) R White	2	3
(Argentina) M Paz (Argentina) G Sabatini	3	7	4
16	(South Africa) B Mould (United States) P Smith	6	6	6
9	(United States) E Nagelsen (United States) A White	6	6
(United States) C Benjamin (United States) J Kaplan	1	1
(United States) A Henricksson (Australia) S Leo	4	0
2	(West Germany) C Kohde-Kilsch (Czechoslovakia) H Suková	6	6

Third round
5	(United States) B Potter (United States) S Walsh-Pete	3	7	6
16	(South Africa) B Mould (United States) P Smith	6	5	3
9	(United States) E Nagelsen (United States) A White	6	4
2	(West Germany) C Kohde-Kilsch (Czechoslovakia) H Suková	7	6

Quarterfinals
5	(United States) B Potter (United States) S Walsh-Pete	6	6	3
2	(West Germany) C Kohde-Kilsch (Czechoslovakia) H Suková	7	4	6
