= David Ison (tennis) =

British tennis player and coach

- Country (sports): United Kingdom
- Born: 26 April 1967 (age 57)

Singles
- Highest ranking: No. 366 (25 November 1991)

Doubles
- Highest ranking: No. 250 (5 October 1992)

David Ison (born 26 April 1967) is a British former tennis player and coach.

Ison partnered Mark Petchey at the 1992 Wimbledon Championship and lost to Michiel Schapers and Daniel Vacek in the first round. Prior to that Ison had partnered Anne Simpkin at the 1990 Wimbledon Championships – Mixed doubles but lost in the first round to Petchey and Sarah Loosemore. At the 1992 Stella Artois Championships doubles Ison and Petchey lost in the round of 32 to Danny Sapsford and Andrew Foster. Ison had a career-high singles ranking of World No. 366 in 1991 and a doubles ranking of World No. 250 in 1992.

Post-retirement from playing Ison has coached at the Bassett Lawn Tennis Club in Southampton. Ison then became head performance tennis coach at David Lloyd, Southampton where he coached Gabriella Taylor.
