= Joey Blake =

American tennis player

- Country (sports): United States
- Born: July 14, 1967 (age 57); Coldwater, Michigan, U.S.
- Height: 5 ft 10 in (178 cm)

Singles
- Career record: 2–2
- Highest ranking: No. 313 (March 23, 1987)

Doubles
- Career record: 1–1
- Highest ranking: No. 422 (July 13, 1987)

Joey Blake (born July 14, 1967) is an American former professional tennis player.

Blake, born in Michigan, was the 1985 US Open junior doubles champion (with Darren Yates) and finished runner-up to Tim Trigueiro in the singles event. He was ranked as high as four in the world for juniors by the ITF.

Attending the University of Arkansas, Blake made an immediate impact in collegiate tennis, winning the 1986 National Indoor Intercollegiate Tennis Championship. He turned professional following his sophomore season.

Blake competed in professional tournaments during the late 1980s with limited success. He had a win over former world number 12 Steve Denton at the 1986 Livingston Open and beat Glenn Michibata at the 1986 Canadian Open.
