= Tim Trigueiro =

American tennis player

- Full name: Tim Trigueiro
- Country (sports): United States
- Born: January 16, 1967 (age 58) Santa Barbara, California, United States
- Height: 1.88 m (6 ft 2 in)
- Plays: Right-handed
- College: UCLA Bruins
- Prize money: $9,847

Singles
- Career record: 0–1
- Career titles: 0; 0 Challenger, 0 Futures
- Highest ranking: No. 364 (19 November 1990)

Grand Slam singles results
- Wimbledon: Q1 (1991)

Doubles
- Career record: 2–1
- Career titles: 0; 0 Challenger, 0 Futures
- Highest ranking: No. 288 (19 August 1991)

Grand Slam doubles results
- Wimbledon: Q1 (1991)
- Last updated on: 2 September 2022.

Tim Trigueiro (born January 16, 1967) is a former professional tennis player from the United States.

== Biography ==
Trigueiro grew up in Santa Barbara, California and is the son of Jack Trigueiro, a sports coach at Santa Barbara High School.

He was the boys' singles champion at the 1985 US Open, then played college tennis for the UCLA Bruins.

On the professional tour, he reached a best singles ranking of 364 in the world. He was a doubles semi-finalist at the 1990 OTB International Open, an ATP Tour tournament held in Schenectady, where he partnered with Czechoslovakia's Martin Střelba.

== Junior Grand Slam finals ==
=== Singles: 1 (1 title) ===
Result	Year	Tournament	Surface	Opponent	Score
Win	1988	US Open	Hard	(United States) Joey Blake	6–2, 6–3
