= Grant Saacks =

- Country (sports): South Africa
- Born: Cape Town, South Africa
- Height: 6 ft 3 in (191 cm)
- Plays: Right-handed

Singles
- Career record: 0–1
- Highest ranking: No. 427 (15 Aug 1988)

Grand Slam singles results
- Wimbledon: Q1 (1985, 1989)

Doubles
- Highest ranking: No. 738 (14 Jul 1986)

Grant Saacks is a South African former professional tennis player.

Born and raised in Cape Town, Saacks was a junior Wimbledon quarter-finalist and played collegiate tennis for Pepperdine University during the late 1980s.

While competing on the professional tour he reached a best singles world ranking of 427 and in 1988 made the main draw of a Grand Prix tournament in Indianapolis, where he lost his first round match in three sets to Jim Pugh.

Earlier in his career he had singles victories over Pete Sampras, Petr Korda and Wayne Ferreira. He was a top 30 Men's player in France and ranked #23 Junior tennis player in the world.
