= Suzi Mair =

Scottish journalist

- Country (sports): United Kingdom
- Born: 26 November 1967 (age 57); Edinburgh, Scotland

Singles

Grand Slam singles results
- Wimbledon: 1R (1984)

Suzi Mair (born 26 November 1967) is a Scottish journalist and former professional tennis player.

== Career ==
Born and raised in Edinburgh, Mair was coached during her childhood by Polish Davis Cup player Ignacy Tłoczyński.

Mair, as a 16-year-old, received a wildcard into the singles main draw of the 1984 Wimbledon Championships, losing in the first round to Amy Holton. She only competed briefly on tour and instead has gone on to have a career in journalism, working for many years as a television news reporter for STV.

== Family ==
Mair is the elder sister of tennis player Michele and comes from a family with a long involvement in sport. Her father was Scotland rugby union international Norman Mair, later a well known sports journalist, as is her mother Lewine Mair, who is a former Daily Telegraph golf correspondent.
