= Tony Giammalva =

American tennis player

- Country (sports): United States
- Born: April 21, 1958 (age 68) Houston, Texas, United States
- Retired: 1985
- Plays: Right-handed
- Prize money: $307,994

Singles
- Career record: 55–78
- Career titles: 0
- Highest ranking: No. 70 (2 February 1981)

Grand Slam singles results
- Australian Open: 2R (1983)
- French Open: 3R (1981)
- Wimbledon: 3R (1981)
- US Open: 3R (1980)

Doubles
- Career record: 86–75
- Career titles: 4
- Highest ranking: No. 32 (22 April 1985)

Grand Slam doubles results
- Australian Open: QF (1982)
- French Open: QF (1985)
- Wimbledon: 2R (1985)
- US Open: 3R (1983)

Tony Giammalva (born April 21, 1958) is a former professional tennis player from the United States.

During his career he won 4 doubles titles and achieved a career-high doubles ranking of World No. 32 in 1985. His best singles ranking was reached in February 1981, at World No. 70.

Giammalva's father Sam played top-level tennis as well, participating on two Davis Cup winning teams for the United States. Tony's younger brother Sammy Jr. was also a touring pro.

== Career finals ==
=== Doubles (4 titles, 5 runner-ups) ===
Result	W/L	Date	Tournament	Surface	Partner	Opponents	Score
Loss	0–1	1980	Hilversum, Netherlands	Clay	(United Kingdom) Buster Mottram	(Netherlands) Tom Okker (Hungary) Balázs Taróczy	5–7, 3–6, 6–7
Loss	0–2	1981	Atlanta, U.S.	Hard	(United States) Sammy Giammalva Jr.	(United States) Fritz Buehning (United States) Peter Fleming	4–6, 6–4, 3–6
Loss	0–3	1982	Frankfurt, West Germany	Carpet	(United States) Tim Mayotte	(United States) Steve Denton (Australia) Mark Edmondson	7–6, 3–6, 3–6
Loss	0–4	1982	Florence, Italy	Clay	(United States) Sammy Giammalva Jr.	(Italy) Paolo Bertolucci (Italy) Adriano Panatta	6–7, 1–6
Loss	0–5	1982	Zell Am See WCT, Austria	Clay	(United States) Sammy Giammalva Jr.	(Poland) Wojciech Fibak (United States) Bruce Manson	7–6, 4–6, 4–6
Win	1–5	1982	Baltimore WCT, U.S.	Carpet	(India) Anand Amritraj	(India) Vijay Amritraj (Australia) Fred Stolle	7–5, 6–2
Win	2–5	1983	Tampa, U.S.	Carpet	(United States) Steve Meister	(United States) Eric Fromm (United States) Drew Gitlin	3–6, 6–1, 7–5
Win	3–5	1983	Maui, U.S.	Hard	(United States) Steve Meister	(United States) Mike Bauer (United States) Scott Davis	6–3, 5–7, 6–4
Win	4–5	1984	Tokyo Indoor, U.S.	Carpet	(United States) Sammy Giammalva Jr.	(Australia) Mark Edmondson (United States) Sherwood Stewart	7–6, 6–4
