= Agustín Moreno =

Mexican tennis player (born 1967)

- Country (sports): Mexico
- Born: 31 March 1967 (age 58) Guadalajara, Mexico
- Height: 1.80 m (5 ft 11 in)
- Plays: Right-handed
- Prize money: $144,576

Singles
- Career record: 7–19
- Career titles: 0
- Highest ranking: No. 120 (18 July 1988)

Grand Slam singles results
- Australian Open: 1R (1989)
- Wimbledon: 1R (1988)
- US Open: 1R (1988, 1989)

Doubles
- Career record: 23–25
- Career titles: 0
- Highest ranking: No. 40 (15 May 1989)

Agustín Moreno (born 31 March 1967) is a tennis coach and a former tennis player from Mexico.

Moreno represented his native country at the 1988 Summer Olympics in Seoul, where he was defeated in the second round by Sweden's Stefan Edberg. He reached his highest singles ATP-ranking on 18 July 1988 of world No. 120. His career high ranking in doubles was No. 40. In 1985, he became the World No. 1 in the junior ITF rankings after winning the Wimbledon doubles title. Moreno was a key player in the Mexican Davis cup team during his era.

He is currently the Head Women's coach of Loyola Marymount University in Los Angeles.

== Career finals ==
=== Doubles (2 runner-ups) ===
Result	No.	Date	Tournament	Surface	Partner	Opponents	Score
Loss	0–1	May 1989	Charleston, U.S.	Clay	(Peru) Jaime Yzaga	(Sweden) Mikael Pernfors (Sweden) Tobias Svantesson	4–6, 6–4, 5–7
Loss	0–2	Oct 1989	Bordeaux, France	Clay	(Peru) Jaime Yzaga	(Spain) Tomás Carbonell (Peru) Carlos di Laura	4–6, 3–6
