= 1985 Wimbledon Championships =

- Date: 24 June – 7 July
- Edition: 99th
- Category: Grand Slam
- Draw: 128S/64D/64XD
- Prize money: £1,934,760
- Surface: Grass
- Location: Church Road; SW19, Wimbledon, London, United Kingdom
- Venue: All England Lawn Tennis and Croquet Club

Champions

Men's singles
- (West Germany) Boris Becker

Women's singles
- (United States) Martina Navratilova

Men's doubles
- (Switzerland) Heinz Günthardt / (Hungary) Balázs Taróczy

Women's doubles
- (United States) Kathy Jordan / (Australia) Elizabeth Smylie

Mixed doubles
- (Australia) Paul McNamee / (United States) Martina Navratilova

Boys' singles
- (Mexico) Leonardo Lavalle

Girls' singles
- (Czechoslovakia) Andrea Holíková

Boys' doubles
- (Mexico) Agustín Moreno / (Peru) Jaime Yzaga

Girls' doubles
- (Australia) Louise Field / (Australia) Janine Thompson
- Wimbledon Championships

The 1985 Wimbledon Championships was a tennis tournament played on grass courts at the All England Lawn Tennis and Croquet Club in Wimbledon, London in the United Kingdom. It was the 99th edition of the Wimbledon Championships and were held from 24 June to 7 July 1985.

These were the last Championships to use white tennis balls.

== Prize money ==
The total prize money for 1985 championships was £1,934,760. The winner of the men's title earned £130,000 while the women's singles champion earned £117,000.

Event	W	F	SF	QF	Round of 16	Round of 32	Round of 64	Round of 128
Men's singles	£130,000	£65,000	£32,500	£16,500	£8,680	£4,864	£2,865	£1,750
Women's singles	£117,000	£58,500	£28,500	£13,954	£6,950	£3,750	£2,210	£1,350
Men's doubles *	£47,500	£23,750	£11,880	£5,450	£2,810	£1,490	£870	—N/a
Women's doubles *	£41,100	£20,550	£9,500	£4,360	£2,100	£1,100	£640	—N/a
Mixed doubles *	£23,400	£11,700	£5,850	£2,730	£1,370	£680	£300	—N/a

_{* per team}

== Champions ==
=== Seniors ===
==== Men's singles ====
(West Germany) Boris Becker defeated (United States) Kevin Curren, 6–3, 6–7^{(4–7)}, 7–6^{(7–3)}, 6–4

- It was Becker's 1st career Grand Slam title and his 1st Wimbledon title.

==== Women's singles ====
(United States) Martina Navratilova defeated (United States) Chris Evert Lloyd, 4–6, 6–3, 6–2

- It was Navratilova's 33rd career Grand Slam title and her 6th Wimbledon singles title.

==== Men's doubles ====
(Switzerland) Heinz Günthardt / (Hungary) Balázs Taróczy defeated (Australia) Pat Cash / (Australia) John Fitzgerald, 6–4, 6–3, 4–6, 6–3

- It was Günthardt's 3rd career Grand Slam title and his only Wimbledon title. It was Taróczy's 2nd and last career Grand Slam title and his only Wimbledon title.

==== Women's doubles ====
(United States) Kathy Jordan / (Australia) Elizabeth Smylie defeated (United States) Martina Navratilova / (United States) Pam Shriver, 5–7, 6–3, 6–4

- It was Jordan's 5th career Grand Slam title and her 2nd Wimbledon title. It was Smylie's 2nd career Grand Slam title and her 1st Wimbledon title.

==== Mixed doubles ====
(Australia) Paul McNamee / (United States) Martina Navratilova defeated (Australia) John Fitzgerald / (Australia) Elizabeth Smylie, 7–5, 4–6, 6–2

- It was McNamee's 5th and last career Grand Slam title and his 3rd Wimbledon title. It was Navratilova's 34th career Grand Slam title and her 13th Wimbledon title.

=== Juniors ===
==== Boys' singles ====
(Mexico) Leonardo Lavalle defeated (Mexico) Eduardo Vélez, 6–4, 6–4

==== Girls' singles ====
(Czechoslovakia) Andrea Holíková defeated (Australia) Jenny Byrne, 7–5, 6–1

==== Boys' doubles ====
(Mexico) Agustín Moreno / (Peru) Jaime Yzaga defeated (Czechoslovakia) Petr Korda / (Czechoslovakia) Cyril Suk, 7–6^{(7–3)}, 6–4

==== Girls' doubles ====
(Australia) Louise Field / (Australia) Janine Thompson defeated (South Africa) Elna Reinach / (New Zealand) Julie Richardson, 6–1, 6–2

== Singles seeds ==
=== Men's singles ===
1. (United States) John McEnroe (quarterfinals, lost to Kevin Curren)
2. (Czechoslovakia) Ivan Lendl (fourth round, lost to Henri Leconte)
3. (United States) Jimmy Connors (semifinals, lost to Kevin Curren)
4. (Sweden) Mats Wilander (first round, lost to Slobodan Živojinović)
5. (Sweden) Anders Järryd (semifinals, lost to Boris Becker)
6. (Australia) Pat Cash (second round, lost to Ricardo Acuña)
7. (Sweden) Joakim Nyström (third round, lost to Boris Becker)
8. (United States) Kevin Curren (final, lost to Boris Becker)
9. (United States) Johan Kriek (third round, lost to Andreas Maurer)
10. (United States) Aaron Krickstein (first round, lost to Bud Schultz)
11. (France) Yannick Noah (third round, lost to Vijay Amritraj)
12. (Czechoslovakia) Miloslav Mečíř (first round, lost to Tom Gullikson)
13. (United States) Eliot Teltscher (second round, lost to Henri Leconte)
14. (Sweden) Stefan Edberg (fourth round, lost to Kevin Curren)
15. (Czechoslovakia) Tomáš Šmíd (second round, lost to Sammy Giammalva)
16. (United States) Tim Mayotte (fourth round, lost to Boris Becker)

=== Women's singles ===
1. (United States) Chris Evert Lloyd (final, lost to Martina Navratilova)
  (United States) Martina Navratilova (champion) (Note: Both Chris Evert Lloyd and Martina Navratilova were seeded #1, reflecting Evert Lloyd's status as the #1 ranked player and Navratilova's as the 3-time defending champion, with no seed #2 awarded. As Evert Lloyd was placed at the top of the draw sheet, she was in effect the de facto #1.)
2. n/a (Note: No seed #2 was awarded as both Chris Evert Lloyd and Martina Navratilova were jointly seeded #1.)
3. (Czechoslovakia) Hana Mandlíková (third round, lost to Elizabeth Smylie)
4. (Bulgaria) Manuela Maleeva (fourth round, lost to Molly Van Nostrand)
5. (United States) Pam Shriver (quarterfinals, lost to Martina Navratilova)
6. (West Germany) Claudia Kohde-Kilsch (second round, lost to Jo Durie)
7. (Czechoslovakia) Helena Suková (quarterfinals, lost to Kathy Rinaldi)
8. (United States) Zina Garrison (semifinals, lost to Martina Navratilova)
9. (United States) Bonnie Gadusek (second round, lost to Anne Smith)
10. (United States) Kathy Jordan (second round, lost to Larisa Savchenko)
11. (West Germany) Steffi Graf (fourth round, lost to Pam Shriver)
12. (Sweden) Catarina Lindqvist (first round, lost to Barbara Potter)
13. (Canada) Carling Bassett (second round, lost to Rene Uys)
14. (Australia) Wendy Turnbull (third round, lost to Pascale Paradis)
15. (Argentina) Gabriela Sabatini (third round, lost to Catherine Tanvier)
16. (United States) Kathy Rinaldi (semifinals, lost to Chris Evert Lloyd)

== Notes ==
Preceded by 1985 French Open	Grand Slams	Succeeded by 1985 U.S. Open
