= 1987 Donnay Indoor Championships – Doubles =

Doubles
- 1987 Donnay Indoor Championships

Final
- Champions: (West Germany) Boris Becker (Socialist Federal Republic of Yugoslavia) Slobodan Živojinović
- Runners-up: (United States) Chip Hooper (United States) Mike Leach
- Score: 7–6, 7–6

Events
Singles	Doubles
← 1986 ·	Donnay Indoor Championships	· 1988 →

Boris Becker and Slobodan Živojinović were the defending champions.

Becker and Živojinović successfully defended their title, defeating Chip Hooper and Mike Leach 7–6, 7–6 in the final.

== Seeds ==
1. (West Germany) Boris Becker / (Socialist Federal Republic of Yugoslavia) Slobodan Živojinović (champions)
2. (Spain) Sergio Casal / (Spain) Emilio Sánchez (semifinals)
3. (United States) Chip Hooper / (United States) Mike Leach (final)
4. (Switzerland) Jakob Hlasek / (Czechoslovakia) Tomáš Šmíd (first round)

== Draw ==
=== Key ===
- Q = Qualifier
- WC = Wild card
- LL = Lucky loser
- Alt = Alternate
- SE = Special exempt
- PR = Protected ranking
- ITF = ITF entry
- JE = Junior exempt
- w/o = Walkover
- r = Retired
- d = Defaulted
- SR = Special ranking

=== Draw ===
First round
1	(West Germany) B Becker (Socialist Federal Republic of Yugoslavia) S Živojinović	4	6	6
(Uruguay) D Pérez (Brazil) J Soares	6	0	1
WC	(Belgium) A Brichant (Belgium) J Vanlangendonck	4	2
(Italy) P Canè (Italy) S Colombo	6	6
4	(Switzerland) J Hlasek (Czechoslovakia) T Šmíd	4	1
(Sweden) A Järryd (Sweden) J Svensson	6	6
(Czechoslovakia) S Birner (Netherlands) H van Boeckel	6	1	6
(Sweden) J Gunnarsson (West Germany) E Jelen	1	6	2
(Australia) R Barlow (United Kingdom) D Felgate	6	6
(Australia) C Limberger (Australia) M Woodforde	7	7
(Australia) B Dyke (Australia) M Kratzmann	2	0
3	(United States) C Hooper (United States) M Leach	6	6
(South Africa) B Levine (Australia) L Warder	6	6
(Australia) A Emerson (Australia) D Tyson	4	4
(Israel) S Glickstein (Israel) A Mansdorf	1	4
2	(Spain) S Casal (Spain) E Sánchez	6	6

Quarterfinals
1	(West Germany) B Becker (Socialist Federal Republic of Yugoslavia) S Živojinović	7	7
(Italy) P Canè (Italy) S Colombo	5	6
(Sweden) A Järryd (Sweden) J Svensson	7	6
(Czechoslovakia) S Birner (Netherlands) H van Boeckel	5	2
(Australia) C Limberger (Australia) M Woodforde	5	6	6
3	(United States) C Hooper (United States) M Leach	7	4	7
(South Africa) B Levine (Australia) L Warder	6	4	6
2	(Spain) S Casal (Spain) E Sánchez	1	6	7

Semifinals
1	(West Germany) B Becker (Socialist Federal Republic of Yugoslavia) S Živojinović	4
(Sweden) A Järryd (Sweden) J Svensson	1^{r}
3	(United States) C Hooper (United States) M Leach	6	6	7
2	(Spain) S Casal (Spain) E Sánchez	4	7	6

Final
1	(West Germany) B Becker (Socialist Federal Republic of Yugoslavia) S Živojinović	7	7
3	(United States) C Hooper (United States) M Leach	6	6
