= 1987 Donnay Indoor Championships – Singles =

Singles
- 1987 Donnay Indoor Championships

Final
- Champion: (Sweden) Mats Wilander
- Runner-up: (United States) John McEnroe
- Score: 6–3, 6–4

Events
Singles	Doubles
← 1986 ·	Donnay Indoor Championships	· 1988 →

Mats Wilander was the defending champion.

Wilander successfully defended his title, defeating John McEnroe 6–3, 6–4 in the final.

== Seeds ==
1. (West Germany) Boris Becker (quarterfinals)
2. (Sweden) Mats Wilander (champion)
3. (United States) John McEnroe (final)
4. (Spain) Emilio Sánchez (first round)
5. (Sweden) Jonas Svensson (semifinals)
6. (Switzerland) Jakob Hlasek (quarterfinals)
7. (Sweden) Anders Järryd (semifinals)
8. (Israel) Amos Mansdorf (second round)

== Draw ==
=== Key ===
- Q = Qualifier
- WC = Wild card
- LL = Lucky loser
- Alt = Alternate
- SE = Special exempt
- PR = Protected ranking
- ITF = ITF entry
- JE = Junior exempt
- w/o = Walkover
- r = Retired
- d = Defaulted
- SR = Special ranking

=== Finals ===
Semifinals
7	(Sweden) Anders Järryd	3	3
3	(United States) John McEnroe	6	6
5	(Sweden) Jonas Svensson	3	2
2	(Sweden) Mats Wilander	6	6

Final
3	(United States) John McEnroe	3	4
2	(Sweden) Mats Wilander	6	6

=== Top half ===
First round
1	(West Germany) B Becker	7	6
LL	(Sweden) P Lindgren	6	3
(Socialist Federal Republic of Yugoslavia) S Živojinović	6	6
(West Germany) E Jelen	4	3
(Spain) S Casal	6	4
(Soviet Union) A Chesnokov	7	6
(Czechoslovakia) L Pimek	3	3
7	(Sweden) A Järryd	6	6
3	(United States) J McEnroe	6	6
(Italy) P Canè	3	1
(Czechoslovakia) T Šmid	6	4
Q	(Sweden) T Högstedt	7	6
WC	(Belgium) J Vanlangendonck	5	7	3
(United States) M Leach	7	6	6
(United States) J Canter	2	4
6	(Switzerland) J Hlasek	6	6

Second round
1	(West Germany) B Becker	3	6	6
(Socialist Federal Republic of Yugoslavia) S Živojinović	6	4	4
(Soviet Union) A Chesnokov	2	3
7	(Sweden) A Järryd	6	6
3	(United States) J McEnroe	7	6
Q	(Sweden) T Högstedt	6	1
(United States) M Leach	6	5	3
6	(Switzerland) J Hlasek	2	7	6

Quarterfinals
1	(West Germany) B Becker	6	3	4
7	(Sweden) A Järryd	4	6	6
3	(United States) J McEnroe	6	7
6	(Switzerland) J Hlasek	3	5

Semifinals
7	(Sweden) A Järryd	3	3
3	(United States) J McEnroe	6	6

=== Bottom half ===
First round
5	(Sweden) J Svensson	6	6
(Peru) P Arraya	3	3
(Australia) C Limberger	7	2	6
WC	(Belgium) K Demuynck	5	6	4
(Italy) S Colombo	6	4	6
(Czechoslovakia) K Nováček	2	6	4
(Sweden) J Gunnarsson	6	7
4	(Spain) E Sánchez	1	6
8	(Israel) A Mansdorf	6	6
(Australia) B Dyke	3	3
WC	(Belgium) Christoph Geukens	3	2
Q	(Israel) G Bloom	6	6
Q	(Australia) M Kratzmann	4	6	6
(Uruguay) D Pérez	6	3	2
Q	(Belgium) E Masso	5	2
2	(Sweden) M Wilander	7	6

Second round
5	(Sweden) J Svensson	6	5	6
(Australia) C Limberger	2	7	3
(Italy) S Colombo	6	0	1
(Sweden) J Gunnarsson	3	6	6
8	(Israel) A Mansdorf	6	6	4
Q	(Israel) G Bloom	1	7	6
Q	(Australia) M Kratzmann	0	2
2	(Sweden) M Wilander	6	6

Quarterfinals
5	(Sweden) J Svensson	6	6
(Sweden) J Gunnarsson	3	3
Q	(Israel) G Bloom	7	3	2
2	(Sweden) M Wilander	5	6	6

Semifinals
5	(Sweden) J Svensson	3	2
2	(Sweden) M Wilander	6	6
