= 1988 Donnay Indoor Championships – Doubles =

Doubles
- 1988 Donnay Indoor Championships

Final
- Champions: (Australia) Wally Masur (Netherlands) Tom Nijssen
- Runners-up: (Australia) John Fitzgerald (Czechoslovakia) Tomáš Šmíd
- Score: 7–5, 7–6

Details
- Draw: 16
- Seeds: 4

Events
Singles	Doubles
← 1987 ·	Donnay Indoor Championships	· 1990 →

Boris Becker and Slobodan Živojinović were the defending champions, but did not participate this year.

Wally Masur and Tom Nijssen won the title, defeating John Fitzgerald and Tomáš Šmíd 7–5, 7–6 in the final.

== Seeds ==
1. (United States) Rick Leach / (United States) Jim Pugh (quarterfinals)
2. (Australia) John Fitzgerald / (Czechoslovakia) Tomáš Šmíd (final)
3. (Australia) Wally Masur / (Netherlands) Tom Nijssen (champions)
4. (West Germany) Eric Jelen / (West Germany) Patrik Kühnen (semifinals, withdrew)

== Draw ==
=== Key ===
- Q = Qualifier
- WC = Wild card
- LL = Lucky loser
- Alt = Alternate
- SE = Special exempt
- PR = Protected ranking
- ITF = ITF entry
- JE = Junior exempt
- w/o = Walkover
- r = Retired
- d = Defaulted
- SR = Special ranking

=== Draw ===
First round
1	(United States) R Leach (United States) J Pugh	6	3	6
(Czechoslovakia) M Šrejber (Czechoslovakia) M Vajda	2	6	3
(Sweden) M Gustafsson (Czechoslovakia) L Pimek	7	4	6
(Netherlands) HJ Davids (Netherlands) J Vekemans	5	6	4
3	(Australia) W Masur (Netherlands) T Nijssen	4	6	6
(West Germany) P Baur (West Germany) U Riglewski	6	2	4
(Italy) D Nargiso (West Germany) C Saceanu	6	7
(Switzerland) H Günthardt (Hungary) B Taróczy	4	6
(Australia) R Barlow (Australia) A Emerson	6	6
(Belgium) G Vanderveeren (Belgium) B Wuyts	2	3
(West Germany) W Popp (West Germany) M Westphal	6	4
4	(West Germany) E Jelen (West Germany) P Kühnen	7	6
(United States) D Cassidy (United States) G Layendecker	w/o
(Netherlands) M Oosting (Netherlands) H van Boeckel
(Belgium) D Langaskens (Belgium) E Masso	3	6	3
2	(Australia) J Fitzgerald (Czechoslovakia) T Šmíd	6	4	6

Quarterfinals
1	(United States) R Leach (United States) J Pugh	6	5	4
(Sweden) M Gustafsson (Czechoslovakia) L Pimek	0	7	6
3	(Australia) W Masur (Netherlands) T Nijssen	7	6
(Italy) D Nargiso (West Germany) C Saceanu	6	3
(Australia) R Barlow (Australia) A Emerson	5	3
4	(West Germany) E Jelen (West Germany) P Kühnen	7	6
(United States) D Cassidy (United States) G Layendecker	1	7	2
2	(Australia) J Fitzgerald (Czechoslovakia) T Šmíd	6	5	6

Semifinals
(Sweden) M Gustafsson (Czechoslovakia) L Pimek	3	3
3	(Australia) W Masur (Netherlands) T Nijssen	6	6
4	(West Germany) E Jelen (West Germany) P Kühnen
2	(Australia) J Fitzgerald (Czechoslovakia) T Šmíd	w/o

Final
3	(Australia) W Masur (Netherlands) T Nijssen	7	7
2	(Australia) J Fitzgerald (Czechoslovakia) T Šmíd	5	6
