= 1987 Davis Cup Europe Zone =

Regional zone tennis results

The Europe Zone was one of the three regional zones of the 1987 Davis Cup.

32 teams entered the Europe Zone in total, with 11 teams competing in the Africa Zone for 2 places in the Europe Zone main draws, joining an additional 21 teams. The winner of each sub-zone was then promoted to the following year's World Group.

Switzerland defeated the Soviet Union in the Zone A final, and Denmark defeated Austria in the Zone B final, resulting in both Switzerland and Denmark being promoted to the 1988 World Group.

== Participating nations ==
Africa Zone:

- Algeria
- Ivory Coast
- Djibouti
- Egypt
- Kenya
- Libya
- Morocco
- Nigeria
- Senegal
- Tunisia
- Zimbabwe

Europe Zones:

- Austria
- Belgium
- Bulgaria
- Cyprus
- Denmark
- Finland
- Greece
- Hungary
- Ireland
- Luxembourg
- Malta
- Monaco
- Netherlands
- Norway
- Poland
- Portugal
- Romania
- Soviet Union
- Switzerland
- Syria
- Turkey

== Africa Zone ==
=== Draw ===
First round 30 January–1 February
Nigeria
bye
Abidjan, Ivory Coast (indoor carpet)
Tunisia	0
Ivory Coast	5
Zimbabwe
bye
Kenya	w/o
Djibouti
Dakar, Senegal (hard)
Morocco	2
Senegal	3
bye
Algeria
Libya
bye
bye
Egypt

Second Round; 13–22 March
Abidjan, Ivory Coast (indoor carpet)
Nigeria	3
Ivory Coast	2
Nairobi, Kenya (clay)
Zimbabwe	5
Kenya	0
Dakar, Senegal (hard)
Senegal	4
Algeria	1
Libya
Egypt	w/o

Third Round; 3–5 April
Harare, Zimbabwe (indoor hard)
Nigeria	2
Zimbabwe	3
Dakar, Senegal (hard)
Senegal	3
Egypt	2

- Zimbabwe and Senegal qualified to the Europe Zone main draws.

== Europe Zone A ==
=== Draw ===
First round 6–10 May
Soviet Union
bye
Damascus, Syria (hard)
Syria	0
Turkey	5
Netherlands
bye
Marsa, Malta (hard)
Malta	1
Ireland	4
Bergen, Norway (indoor carpet)
Senegal	3
Norway	2
bye
Bulgaria
Belgium
bye
bye
Switzerland

Quarterfinals; 12–14 June
Istanbul, Turkey (clay)
Soviet Union	4
Turkey	1
Dublin, Ireland (indoor hard)
Netherlands	4
Ireland	1
Haskovo, Bulgaria (clay)
Senegal	0
Bulgaria	5
Lugano, Switzerland (clay)
Belgium	0
Switzerland	5

Semifinals; 24–26 July
Valkenswaard, Netherlands (indoor carpet)
Soviet Union	4
Netherlands	1
Haskovo, Bulgaria (clay)
Bulgaria	0
Switzerland	5

Final; 2–4 October
Donetsk, Soviet Union (clay)
Soviet Union	2
Switzerland	3

=== First round ===
==== Syria vs. Turkey ====
Syria
0
Damascus, Syria
8–10 May 1987
Hard

Turkey
5

			1	2	3	4	5
1	(Syria) (Turkey)	Hrage Magarian; Necvet Demir	2; 6	5; 7	11; 13
2	(Syria) (Turkey)	Dawood Dawoodian; Yavuz Erkangil	4; 6	6; 8	1; 6
3	(Syria) (Turkey)	Mounged Bouhassoun / Hrage Magarian; Necvet Demir / Alaaddin Karagöz	0; 6	4; 6	4; 6
4	(Syria) (Turkey)	Dawood Dawoodian; Necvet Demir	2; 6	4; 6
5	(Syria) (Turkey)	Hrage Magarian; Yavuz Erkangil	3; 6	2; 6

==== Malta vs. Ireland ====
Malta
1
Marsa Sports Club, Marsa, Malta
6–8 May 1987
Hard

Ireland
4

			1	2	3	4	5
1	(Malta) (Republic of Ireland)	Gordon Asciak; Matt Doyle	3; 6	1; 6	1; 6
2	(Malta) (Republic of Ireland)	Daryl Delicata; Sean Sorensen	1; 6	3; 6	0; 6
3	(Malta) (Republic of Ireland)	Gordon Asciak / Steven Schranz; Matt Doyle / Sean Sorensen	0; 6	4; 6	2; 6
4	(Malta) (Republic of Ireland)	Daryl Delicata; Matt Doyle	3; 6	0; 6
5	(Malta) (Republic of Ireland)	Gordon Asciak; Robert Dolan	6; 2	6; 2

==== Norway vs. Senegal ====
Norway
2
Bergen, Norway
8–10 May 1987
Carpet (indoors)

Senegal
3

			1	2	3	4	5
1	(Norway) (Senegal)	John Erik Rustad; Yahiya Doumbia	7; 5	2; 6	4; 6	6; 2	5; 7
2	(Norway) (Senegal)	Anders Håseth; Abou Berthé	6; 2	6; 4	6; 1
3	(Norway) (Senegal)	Audun Jensen / Bent-Ove Pedersen; Abou Berthé / Yahiya Doumbia	5; 7	3; 6	4; 6
4	(Norway) (Senegal)	John Erik Rustad; Abou Berthé	6; 1	6; 0	6; 1
5	(Norway) (Senegal)	Anders Håseth; Yahiya Doumbia	4; 6	4; 6	1; 6

=== Quarterfinals ===
==== Turkey vs. Soviet Union ====
Turkey
1
Istanbul, Turkey
12–14 June 1987
Clay

Soviet Union
4

			1	2	3	4	5
1	(Turkey) (Soviet Union)	Necvet Demir; Oleksandr Dolgopolov	6; 1	4; 6	4; 6	6; 4	6; 3
2	(Turkey) (Soviet Union)	Kaya Saydas; Andrei Chesnokov	1; 6	0; 6	0; 6
3	(Turkey) (Soviet Union)	Necvet Demir / Alaaddin Karagöz; Sergey Leonyuk / Alexander Zverev	2; 6	2; 6	4; 6
4	(Turkey) (Soviet Union)	Kaya Saydas; Oleksandr Dolgopolov	1; 6	2; 6	1; 6
5	(Turkey) (Soviet Union)	Necvet Demir; Andrei Chesnokov	2; 6	2; 6

==== Ireland vs. Netherlands ====
Ireland
1
Dublin, Ireland
12–14 June 1987
Hard (indoors)

Netherlands
4

			1	2	3	4	5
1	(Republic of Ireland) (Netherlands)	Eoin Collins; Michiel Schapers	2; 6	1; 6	2; 6
2	(Republic of Ireland) (Netherlands)	Matt Doyle; Tom Nijssen	4; 6	6; 3	6; 4	6; 1
3	(Republic of Ireland) (Netherlands)	Matt Doyle / Sean Sorensen; Huub van Boeckel / Michiel Schapers	2; 6	4; 6	4; 6
4	(Republic of Ireland) (Netherlands)	Michael Nugent; Michiel Schapers	0; 6	0; 6	1; 6
5	(Republic of Ireland) (Netherlands)	Eoin Collins; Tom Nijssen	3; 6	2; 6

==== Bulgaria vs. Senegal ====
Bulgaria
5
Haskovo, Bulgaria
12–14 June 1987
Clay

Senegal
0

			1	2	3	4	5
1	(Bulgaria) (Senegal)	Julian Stamatov; Yahiya Doumbia	6; 3	3; 6	16; 14	6; 4
2	(Bulgaria) (Senegal)	Krassimir Lazarov; Abou Berthé	6; 0	6; 1	6; 0
3	(Bulgaria) (Senegal)	Krassimir Lazarov / Julian Stamatov; Abou Berthé / Yahiya Doumbia	6; 3	6; 2	2; 1			retired
4	(Bulgaria) (Senegal)	Julian Stamatov; Abou Berthé	6; 1	6; 0
5	(Bulgaria) (Senegal)	Krassimir Lazarov; Alioune Touré	6; 1	6; 4

==== Switzerland vs. Belgium ====
Switzerland
5
Lugano, Switzerland
12–14 June 1987
Clay

Belgium
0

			1	2	3	4	5
1	(Switzerland) (Belgium)	Claudio Mezzadri; Karel Demuynck	6; 1	6; 1	6; 2
2	(Switzerland) (Belgium)	Jakob Hlasek; Johan de Preter	6; 0	6; 3	6; 1
3	(Switzerland) (Belgium)	Jakob Hlasek / Claudio Mezzadri; Denis Langaskens / Jan Vanlangendonck	6; 4	7; 5	8; 6
4	(Switzerland) (Belgium)	Jakob Hlasek; Karel Demuynck	9; 7	6; 4
5	(Switzerland) (Belgium)	Claudio Mezzadri; Johan de Preter	6; 0	6; 2

=== Semifinals ===
==== Netherlands vs. Soviet Union ====
Netherlands
1
Valkenswaard, Netherlands
24–26 July 1987
Carpet (indoors)

Soviet Union
4

			1	2	3	4	5
1	(Netherlands) (Soviet Union)	Michiel Schapers; Andrei Chesnokov	22; 24	6; 1	2; 6	2; 6
2	(Netherlands) (Soviet Union)	Tom Nijssen; Alexander Volkov	6; 8	5; 7	4; 6
3	(Netherlands) (Soviet Union)	Huub van Boeckel / Michiel Schapers; Sergey Leonyuk / Alexander Zverev	3; 6	6; 4	6; 4	6; 4
4	(Netherlands) (Soviet Union)	Michiel Schapers; Alexander Volkov	2; 6	6; 8	2; 6
5	(Netherlands) (Soviet Union)	Tom Nijssen; Andrei Chesnokov	3; 6	3; 6

==== Bulgaria vs. Switzerland ====
Bulgaria
0
Haskovo, Bulgaria
24–26 July 1987
Clay

Switzerland
5

			1	2	3	4	5
1	(Bulgaria) (Switzerland)	Krassimir Lazarov; Claudio Mezzadri	1; 6	1; 6	1; 6
2	(Bulgaria) (Switzerland)	Ruslan Rainov; Jakob Hlasek	5; 7	2; 6	3; 6
3	(Bulgaria) (Switzerland)	Teodor Bachev / Krassimir Lazarov; Claudio Mezzadri / Roland Stadler	4; 6	4; 6	3; 6
4	(Bulgaria) (Switzerland)	Krassimir Lazarov; Jakob Hlasek	0; 6	4; 6
5	(Bulgaria) (Switzerland)	Ruslan Rainov; Claudio Mezzadri	4; 6	0; 6

=== Final ===
==== Soviet Union vs. Switzerland ====
Soviet Union
2
Donetsk, Soviet Union
2–4 October 1987
Clay

Switzerland
3

			1	2	3	4	5
1	(Soviet Union) (Switzerland)	Alexander Zverev; Claudio Mezzadri	5; 7	2; 6	7; 5	6; 0	2; 6
2	(Soviet Union) (Switzerland)	Andrei Chesnokov; Jakob Hlasek	5; 7	9; 7	6; 4	6; 4
3	(Soviet Union) (Switzerland)	Alexander Volkov / Alexander Zverev; Heinz Günthardt / Jakob Hlasek	6; 4	4; 6	3; 6	5; 7
4	(Soviet Union) (Switzerland)	Andrei Chesnokov; Claudio Mezzadri	6; 2	7; 5	7; 5
5	(Soviet Union) (Switzerland)	Alexander Zverev; Jakob Hlasek	4; 6	3; 6	2; 6

== Europe Zone B ==
=== Draw ===
First round 8–10 May
Austria
bye
Rhodes, Greece (clay)
Greece	5
Luxembourg	0
Hungary
bye
Monte Carlo, Monaco (clay)
Portugal	3
Monaco	2
Harare, Zimbabwe (indoor hard)
Zimbabwe	2
Poland	3
bye
Romania
Helsinki, Finland (indoor carpet)
Cyprus	0
Finland	5
bye
Denmark

Quarterfinals; 12–14 June
Bad Kleinkirchheim, Austria (clay)
Austria	4
Greece	1
Lisbon, Portugal (clay)
Hungary	0
Portugal	5
Brașov, Romania (clay)
Poland	1
Romania	4
Helsinki, Finland (indoor carpet)
Finland	0
Denmark	5

Semifinals; 24–26 July
Porto, Portugal (clay)
Austria	4
Portugal	1
Aarhus, Denmark (clay)
Romania	2
Denmark	3

Final; 2–4 October
Copenhagen, Denmark (indoor carpet)
Austria	2
Denmark	3

=== First round ===
==== Greece vs. Luxembourg ====
Greece
5
Rhodes, Greece
8–10 May 1987
Clay

Luxembourg
0

			1	2	3	4	5
1	(Greece) (Luxembourg)	George Kalovelonis; Serge Brueck	6; 4	6; 1	6; 4
2	(Greece) (Luxembourg)	Anastasios Bavelas; Johny Goudenbour	3; 6	2; 6	8; 6	6; 1	6; 3
3	(Greece) (Luxembourg)	Ioannis Rigas / Fotis Vazeos; Serge Brueck / Jacques Radoux	1; 6	6; 4	14; 12	6; 4
4	(Greece) (Luxembourg)	George Kalovelonis; Jacques Radoux	6; 4	6; 3
5	(Greece) (Luxembourg)	Anastasios Bavelas; Serge Brueck	6; 2	6; 1

==== Monaco vs. Portugal ====
Monaco
2
Monte Carlo, Monaco
8–10 May 1987
Clay

Portugal
3

			1	2	3	4	5
1	(Monaco) (Portugal)	Bernard Balleret; Nuno Marques	3; 6	1; 6	2; 6
2	(Monaco) (Portugal)	Gilles Ganancia; João Cunha e Silva	4; 6	6; 4	7; 5	6; 4
3	(Monaco) (Portugal)	Bernard Balleret / Albert Viviani; Pedro Cordeiro / João Cunha e Silva	4; 6	2; 6	4; 6
4	(Monaco) (Portugal)	Gilles Ganancia; Nuno Marques	7; 5	6; 2	7; 5
5	(Monaco) (Portugal)	Bernard Balleret; João Cunha e Silva	3; 6	4; 6	6; 0	5; 7

==== Zimbabwe vs. Poland ====
Zimbabwe
2
City Sports Centre, Harare, Zimbabwe
8–10 May 1987
Hard (indoors)

Poland
3

			1	2	3	4	5
1	(Zimbabwe) (Poland)	Mark Gurr; Lech Bieńkowski	0; 6	4; 6	6; 1	1; 6
2	(Zimbabwe) (Poland)	Byron Black; Wojciech Kowalski	4; 6	5; 7	6; 4	6; 2	6; 1
3	(Zimbabwe) (Poland)	Byron Black / Mark Gurr; Lech Bieńkowski / Wojciech Kowalski	6; 8	6; 1	7; 9	6; 8
4	(Zimbabwe) (Poland)	Byron Black; Lech Bieńkowski	6; 1	6; 4	6; 2
5	(Zimbabwe) (Poland)	Mark Gurr; Wojciech Kowalski	6; 3	3; 6	3; 6	3; 6

==== Finland vs. Cyprus ====
Finland
5
Talin Tenniskeskus, Helsinki, Finland
8–10 May 1987
Carpet (indoors)

Cyprus
0

			1	2	3	4	5
1	(Finland) (Cyprus)	Veli Paloheimo; Alkis Papamichael	6; 0	6; 1	6; 1
2	(Finland) (Cyprus)	Olli Rahnasto; Yiannos Hadjigeorgiou	8; 6	6; 2	6; 0
3	(Finland) (Cyprus)	Mika Hedman / Olli Rahnasto; Yiannos Hadjigeorgiou / Phivos Zachariades	6; 1	6; 2	6; 3
4	(Finland) (Cyprus)	Olli Rahnasto; Alkis Papamichael	6; 1	6; 3
5	(Finland) (Cyprus)	Veli Paloheimo; Yiannos Hadjigeorgiou	6; 2	6; 1

=== Quarterfinals ===
==== Austria vs. Greece ====
Austria
4
Bad Kleinkirchheim, Austria
12–14 June 1987
Clay

Greece
1

			1	2	3	4	5
1	(Austria) (Greece)	Horst Skoff; George Kalovelonis	6; 2	6; 4	6; 3
2	(Austria) (Greece)	Thomas Muster; Anastasios Bavelas	7; 5	6; 0	6; 1
3	(Austria) (Greece)	Alex Antonitsch / Thomas Muster; George Kalovelonis / Ioannis Rigas	6; 2	6; 2	6; 2
4	(Austria) (Greece)	Thomas Muster; George Kalovelonis	6; 1	7; 5
5	(Austria) (Greece)	Horst Skoff; Anastasios Bavelas	6; 8	6; 3	4; 6

==== Portugal vs. Hungary ====
Portugal
5
Estádio Nacional, Lisbon, Portugal
12–14 June 1987
Clay

Hungary
0

			1	2	3	4	5
1	(Portugal) (Hungary)	João Cunha e Silva; András Lányi	6; 4	6; 4	5; 7	8; 6
2	(Portugal) (Hungary)	Nuno Marques; László Markovits	6; 1	6; 3	6; 0
3	(Portugal) (Hungary)	Pedro Cordeiro / João Cunha e Silva; Sándor Kiss / András Lányi	6; 2	7; 9	6; 4	6; 2
4	(Portugal) (Hungary)	Nuno Marques; András Lányi	6; 0	4; 6	6; 2
5	(Portugal) (Hungary)	João Cunha e Silva; László Markovits	4; 6	6; 2	6; 1

==== Romania vs. Poland ====
Romania
4
Brașov, Romania
12–14 June 1987
Clay

Poland
1

			1	2	3	4	5
1	(Romania) (Poland)	Adrian Marcu; Wojciech Kowalski	6; 1	6; 2	6; 2
2	(Romania) (Poland)	Florin Segărceanu; Lech Bieńkowski	6; 3	6; 1	6; 3
3	(Romania) (Poland)	Andrei Dîrzu / Florin Segărceanu; Lech Bieńkowski / Wojciech Kowalski	6; 3	7; 5	6; 2
4	(Romania) (Poland)	Mihai Vanta; Wojciech Kowalski	8; 6	3; 6	5; 7
5	(Romania) (Poland)	Adrian Marcu; Lech Bieńkowski	6; 3	6; 2

==== Finland vs. Denmark ====
Finland
0
Talin Tenniskeskus, Helsinki, Finland
12–14 June 1987
Carpet (indoors)

Denmark
5

			1	2	3	4	5
1	(Finland) (Denmark)	Olli Rahnasto; Morten Christensen	6; 1	8; 10	4; 6	5; 7
2	(Finland) (Denmark)	Veli Paloheimo; Michael Tauson	6; 3	7; 5	4; 6	2; 6	2; 6
3	(Finland) (Denmark)	Kimmo Alkio / Olli Rahnasto; Morten Christensen / Michael Tauson	2; 6	1; 6	2; 6
4	(Finland) (Denmark)	Olli Rahnasto; Michael Tauson	4; 6	4; 6
5	(Finland) (Denmark)	Veli Paloheimo; Morten Christensen	4; 6	11; 13

=== Semifinals ===
==== Portugal vs. Austria ====
Portugal
1
Oporto Tennis Club, Porto, Portugal
24–26 July 1987
Clay

Austria
4

			1	2	3	4	5
1	(Portugal) (Austria)	Nuno Marques; Horst Skoff	6; 8	3; 6	3; 6
2	(Portugal) (Austria)	João Cunha e Silva; Thomas Muster	1; 6	7; 9	3; 6
3	(Portugal) (Austria)	Pedro Cordeiro / João Cunha e Silva; Alex Antonitsch / Thomas Muster	3; 6	6; 4	4; 6	3; 6
4	(Portugal) (Austria)	Nuno Marques; Thomas Muster	3; 6	7; 5	5; 7
5	(Portugal) (Austria)	João Cunha e Silva; Horst Skoff	4; 6	6; 1	6; 3

==== Denmark vs. Romania ====
Denmark
3
Aarhus, Denmark
24–26 July 1987
Clay

Romania
2

			1	2	3	4	5
1	(Denmark) (Romania)	Peter Bastiansen; Florin Segărceanu	4; 6	3; 6	6; 3	6; 3	5; 7
2	(Denmark) (Romania)	Michael Tauson; Adrian Marcu	6; 2	6; 2	1; 6	4; 6	6; 3
3	(Denmark) (Romania)	Peter Bastiansen / Michael Mortensen; Andrei Dîrzu / Florin Segărceanu	10; 8	6; 3	3; 6	3; 6	6; 2
4	(Denmark) (Romania)	Peter Bastiansen; Adrian Marcu	1; 6	2; 6	3; 6
5	(Denmark) (Romania)	Michael Tauson; Florin Segărceanu	6; 4	5; 7	6; 4	9; 7

=== Final ===
==== Denmark vs. Austria ====
Denmark
3
Copenhagen, Denmark
2–4 October 1987
Carpet (indoors)

Austria
2

			1	2	3	4	5
1	(Denmark) (Austria)	Morten Christensen; Thomas Muster	6; 4	6; 2	6; 2
2	(Denmark) (Austria)	Michael Tauson; Horst Skoff	6; 4	4; 6	6; 3	6; 2
3	(Denmark) (Austria)	Morten Christensen / Michael Mortensen; Alex Antonitsch / Thomas Muster	5; 7	6; 3	10; 12	3; 6
4	(Denmark) (Austria)	Morten Christensen; Horst Skoff	8; 10	6; 4	6; 8	1; 6
5	(Denmark) (Austria)	Michael Tauson; Thomas Muster	6; 8	12; 10	2; 6	6; 3	6; 4
