= 1988 Donnay Indoor Championships – Singles =

Singles
- 1988 Donnay Indoor Championships

Final
- Champion: (France) Henri Leconte
- Runner-up: (Switzerland) Jakob Hlasek
- Score: 7–6^{(7–3)}, 7–6^{(8–6)}, 6–4

Details
- Draw: 32
- Seeds: 8

Events
Singles	Doubles
← 1987 ·	Donnay Indoor Championships	· 1990 →

Mats Wilander was the defending champion, but did not participate this year.

Henri Leconte won the title, defeating Jakob Hlasek 7–6^{(7–3)}, 7–6^{(8–6)}, 6–4 in the final.

== Seeds ==
1. (France) Henri Leconte (champion)
2. (Switzerland) Jakob Hlasek (final)
3. (Sweden) Jonas Svensson (first round)
4. (Australia) John Fitzgerald (semifinals)
5. (Haiti) Ronald Agénor (second round)
6. (Czechoslovakia) Milan Šrejber (second round)
7. (Sweden) Magnus Gustafsson (first round)
8. (Australia) Wally Masur (quarterfinals)

== Draw ==
=== Key ===
- Q = Qualifier
- WC = Wild card
- LL = Lucky loser
- Alt = Alternate
- SE = Special exempt
- PR = Protected ranking
- ITF = ITF entry
- JE = Junior exempt
- w/o = Walkover
- r = Retired
- d = Defaulted
- SR = Special ranking

=== Finals ===
Semifinals
1	(France) Henri Leconte	6	2	6
4	(Australia) John Fitzgerald	4	6	2
(West Germany) Patrik Kühnen	6	0^{r}
2	(Switzerland) Jakob Hlasek	7	3

Final
1	(France) Henri Leconte	7	7	6
2	(Switzerland) Jakob Hlasek	6	6	4

=== Top half ===
First round
1	(France) H Leconte	7	6
(Italy) D Nargiso	6	2
(Belgium) E Masso	6	6	7
(Czechoslovakia) T Šmid	7	3	6
Q	(Netherlands) J Vekemans	3	6
(West Germany) M Westphal	6	7
(Czechoslovakia) M Vajda	7	4	0
8	(Australia) W Masur	6	6	6
4	(Australia) J Fitzgerald	6	6
(Czechoslovakia) L Pimek	3	4
Q	(Belgium) X Daufresne	1	2
Q	(Belgium) K Demuynck	6	6
WC	(Belgium) B Wuyts	3	4
(West Germany) E Jelen	6	6
(Netherlands) M Oosting	3	3
5	(Haiti) R Agénor	6	6

Second round
1	(France) H Leconte	6	6
(Belgium) E Masso	3	4
(West Germany) M Westphal	2	7	4
8	(Australia) W Masur	6	5	6
4	(Australia) J Fitzgerald	6	6
Q	(Belgium) K Demuynck	4	4
(West Germany) E Jelen	4	6	7
5	(Haiti) R Agénor	6	4	5

Quarterfinals
1	(France) H Leconte	6	1	6
8	(Australia) W Masur	4	6	3
4	(Australia) J Fitzgerald	6	3	6
(West Germany) E Jelen	1	6	0

Semifinals
1	(France) H Leconte	6	2	6
4	(Australia) J Fitzgerald	4	6	2

=== Bottom half ===
First round
6	(Czechoslovakia) M Šrejber	6	6
LL	(Belgium) G Vanderveeren	4	4
(France) É Winogradsky	6	6
(United States) D Cassidy	4	4
(France) J Potier	6	4
(West Germany) P Kühnen	7	6
(West Germany) C Saceanu	6	7
3	(Sweden) J Svensson	2	5
7	(Sweden) M Gustafsson	6	3
Q	(Australia) R Barlow	7	6
(Netherlands) T Nijssen	6	6
WC	(Iran) M Bahrami	3	3
(France) A Boetsch	7	1	4
(United States) G Layendecker	6	6	6
(Spain) A Tous	1	5
2	(Switzerland) J Hlasek	6	7

Second round
6	(Czechoslovakia) M Šrejber	4	6	6
(France) É Winogradsky	6	3	7
(West Germany) P Kühnen	6	7
(West Germany) C Saceanu	3	6
Q	(Australia) R Barlow	3	0
(Netherlands) T Nijssen	6	6
(United States) G Layendecker	6	6	4
2	(Switzerland) J Hlasek	4	7	6

Quarterfinals
(France) É Winogradsky	4	2
(West Germany) P Kühnen	6	6
(Netherlands) T Nijssen	5	4
2	(Switzerland) J Hlasek	7	6

Semifinals
(West Germany) P Kühnen	6	0^{r}
2	(Switzerland) J Hlasek	7	3
