= 1987 Donnay Indoor Championships =

- Date: 23–29 March
- Edition: 7th
- Draw: 32S / 16D
- Prize money: $250,000
- Surface: Carpet / indoor
- Location: Brussels, Belgium
- Venue: Forest National

Champions

Singles
- (Sweden) Mats Wilander

Doubles
- (West Germany) Boris Becker / (Socialist Federal Republic of Yugoslavia) Slobodan Živojinović
← 1986 ·	Donnay Indoor Championships	· 1988 →

The 1987 Donnay Indoor Championships was a men's tennis tournament played on indoor carpet courts at the Forest National in Brussels, Belgium the event was part of the 1987 Nabisco Grand Prix. It was the seventh edition of the tournament and was held from 23 March until 29 March 1987. Second-seeded Mats Wilander won the singles title.

== Finals ==
=== Singles ===
(Sweden) Mats Wilander defeated (United States) John McEnroe, 6–3, 6–4

- It was Wilander's 2nd singles title of the year and the 22nd of his career.

=== Doubles ===
(West Germany) Boris Becker / (Socialist Federal Republic of Yugoslavia) Slobodan Živojinović defeated (United States) Chip Hooper / (United States) Mike Leach, 7–6, 7–6
