= 1985 Donnay Indoor Championships – Singles =

Singles
- 1985 Donnay Indoor Championships

Final
- Champion: (Sweden) Anders Järryd
- Runner-up: (Sweden) Mats Wilander
- Score: 6–4, 3–6, 7–5

Details
- Draw: 32
- Seeds: 8

Events
Singles	Doubles
← 1984 ·	Donnay Indoor Championships	· 1986 →

John McEnroe was the defending champion, but did not participate this year.

Anders Järryd won the title, defeating Mats Wilander 6–4, 3–6, 7–5 in the final.

== Seeds ==
1. (Sweden) Mats Wilander (final)
2. (Sweden) Anders Järryd (champion)
3. (South Africa) Kevin Curren (first round)
4. (Australia) Pat Cash (semifinals)
5. (Sweden) Stefan Edberg (semifinals)
6. (Sweden) Joakim Nyström (quarterfinals)
7. (Czechoslovakia) Tomáš Šmíd (quarterfinals)
8. (Sweden) Jan Gunnarsson (first round)

== Draw ==
=== Key ===
- Q = Qualifier
- WC = Wild card
- LL = Lucky loser
- Alt = Alternate
- SE = Special exempt
- PR = Protected ranking
- ITF = ITF entry
- JE = Junior exempt
- w/o = Walkover
- r = Retired
- d = Defaulted
- SR = Special ranking

=== Finals ===
Semifinals
1	(Sweden) Mats Wilander	6	7
4	(Australia) Pat Cash	3	6
5	(Sweden) Stefan Edberg	6	6	3
2	(Sweden) Anders Järryd	7	3	6

Final
1	(Sweden) Mats Wilander	4	6	5
2	(Sweden) Anders Järryd	6	3	7

=== Top half ===
First round
1	(Sweden) M Wilander	6	6
(Australia) J Fitzgerald	3	4
WC	(Belgium) J Grandjean	4	6
(Paraguay) F González	6	7
(India) V Amritraj	6	6	7
WC	(Belgium) K Demuynck	2	7	6
(Switzerland) H Günthardt	6	6
8	(Sweden) J Gunnarsson	3	3
4	(Australia) P Cash	2	6	6
Q	(United States) M De Palmer	6	3	3
(United States) M Mitchell	4	1
(United States) M Dickson	6	0^{r}
(United Kingdom) J Lloyd	6	6
(United States) S Meister	1	4
(France) H Leconte	2	3
6	(Sweden) J Nyström	6	6

Second round
1	(Sweden) M Wilander	6	7
(Paraguay) F González	4	6
(India) V Amritraj	6	3	0
(Switzerland) H Günthardt	1	6	6
4	(Australia) P Cash	7	6
(United States) M Mitchell	5	4
(United Kingdom) J Lloyd	6	6	4
6	(Sweden) J Nyström	4	7	6

Quarterfinals
1	(Sweden) M Wilander	6	5	7
(Switzerland) H Günthardt	1	7	5
4	(Australia) P Cash	6	6
6	(Sweden) J Nyström	4	2

Semifinals
1	(Sweden) M Wilander	6	7
4	(Australia) P Cash	3	6

=== Bottom half ===
First round
5	(Sweden) S Edberg	6	7
(United States) T Wilkison	1	5
Q	(Switzerland) J Hlasek	6	6
(Czechoslovakia) P Složil	1	2
Q	(United States) C Hooper	3	6	7
(Australia) P McNamee	6	4	5
(United States) S Giammalva Jr.	7	4	6
3/WC	(South Africa) K Curren	6	6	1
7	(Czechoslovakia) T Šmid	6	7
(Australia) T Allan	2	5
(West Germany) B Becker	7	5	6
(United States) B Green	6	7	4
(Australia) J Frawley	3	6	5
Q	(Sweden) T Högstedt	6	4	7
(Poland) W Fibak	6	2	2
2	(Sweden) A Järryd	2	6	6

Second round
5	(Sweden) S Edberg	6	6
Q	(Switzerland) J Hlasek	3	1
Q	(United States) C Hooper	6	1
(United States) S Giammalva Jr.	7	6
7	(Czechoslovakia) T Šmid	5	7	7
(West Germany) B Becker	7	6	5
Q	(Sweden) T Högstedt	3	1
2	(Sweden) A Järryd	6	6

Quarterfinals
5	(Sweden) S Edberg	7	6
(United States) S Giammalva Jr.	6	3
7	(Czechoslovakia) T Šmid	4	4
2	(Sweden) A Järryd	6	6

Semifinals
5	(Sweden) S Edberg	6	6	3
2	(Sweden) A Järryd	7	3	6
