= 1990 Belgian Indoor Championships – Doubles =

Doubles
- 1990 Belgian Indoor Championships

Final
- Champions: (Spain) Emilio Sánchez (Socialist Federal Republic of Yugoslavia) Slobodan Živojinović
- Runners-up: (Socialist Federal Republic of Yugoslavia) Goran Ivanišević (Hungary) Balázs Taróczy
- Score: 7–5, 6–3

Details
- Draw: 16
- Seeds: 4

Events
| Singles | Doubles |
- Belgian Indoor Championships

Wally Masur and Tom Nijssen were the champions of the event when it last took place, in 1988. Neither of them participated in 1990.
Emilio Sánchez and Slobodan Živojinović won the title, defeating Goran Ivanišević and Balázs Taróczy 7–5, 6–3, in the final.

== Seeds ==
1. (United States) Tim Pawsat / (Australia) Laurie Warder (first round)
2. (Iran) Mansour Bahrami / (France) Éric Winogradsky (quarterfinals)
3. (Socialist Federal Republic of Yugoslavia) Goran Ivanišević / (Hungary) Balázs Taróczy (final)
4. (Spain) Emilio Sánchez / (Socialist Federal Republic of Yugoslavia) Slobodan Živojinović (champions)

== Draw ==
Key

- Q = Qualifier
- WC = Wild card
- LL = Lucky loser
- Alt = Alternate
- ITF = ITF entry
- PR = Protected ranking
- SR = Special ranking
- SE = Special exempt
- JE = Junior exempt
- JR = Junior Accelerator Programme entrant
- CO = College Accelerator Programme entrant
- NG = Next Gen Accelerator Program entrant
- w/o = Walkover
- r = Retired
- d = Defaulted

=== Draw ===
First round
1 | (United States) T Pawsat (Australia) L Warder | 4 | 6^{4}
(West Germany) B Becker (West Germany) E Jelen | 6 | 7^{7}
(United States) C Beckman (United States) L Jensen | 6 | 6
(Belgium) G Vanderveeren (Belgium) B Wuyts | 2 | 1
4 | (Spain) E Sánchez (Socialist Federal Republic of Yugoslavia) S Živojinović | 6 | 6
(Belgium) X Daufresne (Belgium) D Langaskens | 3 | 2
(Australia) B Dyke (Denmark) M Mortensen | 4 | 6^{7}
(France) G Forget (Switzerland) J Hlasek | 6 | 7^{9}
(Sweden) M Gustafsson (United States) T Nelson | 6^{3} | 4
(Netherlands) M Koevermans (Netherlands) M Schapers | 7^{7} | 6
(France) T Champion (France) T Tulasne | 6^{3} | 2
3 | (Socialist Federal Republic of Yugoslavia) G Ivanišević (Hungary) B Taróczy | 7^{7} | 6
(Soviet Union) A Cherkasov (Soviet Union) A Volkov | 6 | 6
(Italy) O Camporese (Italy) P Canè | 4 | 1
(Czechoslovakia) K Nováček (Czechoslovakia) T Šmíd | 7 | 6^{8} | 1
2 | (Iran) M Bahrami (France) É Winogradsky | 5 | 7^{10} | 6

Quarterfinals
(West Germany) B Becker (West Germany) E Jelen | 3 | 6 | 6
(United States) C Beckman (United States) L Jensen | 6 | 3 | 3
4 | (Spain) E Sánchez (Socialist Federal Republic of Yugoslavia) S Živojinović | 6 | 7^{7}
(France) G Forget (Switzerland) J Hlasek | 4 | 6^{1}
(Netherlands) M Koevermans (Netherlands) M Schapers | 4 | 6^{6}
3 | (Socialist Federal Republic of Yugoslavia) G Ivanišević (Hungary) B Taróczy | 6 | 7^{8}
(Soviet Union) A Cherkasov (Soviet Union) A Volkov | 7^{7} | 2 | 7
2 | (Iran) M Bahrami (France) É Winogradsky | 6^{5} | 6 | 5

Semifinals
(West Germany) B Becker (West Germany) E Jelen | 3 | 3
4 | (Spain) E Sánchez (Socialist Federal Republic of Yugoslavia) S Živojinović | 6 | 6
3 | (Socialist Federal Republic of Yugoslavia) G Ivanišević (Hungary) B Taróczy | 6 | 4 | 6
(Soviet Union) A Cherkasov (Soviet Union) A Volkov | 1 | 6 | 3

Final
4 | (Spain) E Sánchez (Socialist Federal Republic of Yugoslavia) S Živojinović | 7 | 6
3 | (Socialist Federal Republic of Yugoslavia) G Ivanišević (Hungary) B Taróczy | 5 | 3
