= 1983 Davis Cup Europe Zone =

International tennis competition

The Europe Zone was one of the three regional zones of the 1983 Davis Cup.

25 teams entered the Europe Zone in total, split across two sub-zones. The winner of each sub-zone was promoted to the following year's World Group.

West Germany defeated Switzerland in the Zone A final, and Yugoslavia defeated Hungary in the Zone B final, resulting in both West Germany and Yugoslavia being promoted to the 1984 World Group.

== Participating nations ==
Zone A:

- Belgium
- Egypt
- Greece
- Iraq
- Israel
- Luxembourg
- Monaco
- Netherlands
- Poland
- Portugal
- Switzerland
- West Germany

Zone B:

- Algeria
- Austria
- Bulgaria
- Finland
- Hungary
- Libya
- Morocco
- Norway
- Spain
- Tunisia
- Turkey
- Yugoslavia
- Zimbabwe

== Zone A ==
=== Draw ===
First round 6–8 May
West Germany
bye
Warsaw, Poland (clay)
Poland	0
Belgium	5
Israel
bye
Monte Carlo, Monaco (clay)
Luxembourg	1
Monaco	4
Estoril, Portugal (clay)
Portugal	1
Netherlands	4
bye
Egypt
Iraq
Greece	w/o
bye
Switzerland

Quarterfinals; 10–12 June
Eupen, Belgium (clay)
West Germany	5
Belgium	0
Monte Carlo, Monaco (clay)
Israel	4
Monaco	1
Cairo, Egypt (clay)
Netherlands	4
Egypt	1
Ostermundigen, Switzerland (clay)
Greece	0
Switzerland	5

Semifinals; 8–10 July
Ramat HaSharon, Israel (hard)
West Germany	3
Israel	2
Lugano, Switzerland (clay)
Netherlands	1
Switzerland	3

Final; 30 September–2 October
Freiburg, West Germany (clay)
West Germany	3
Switzerland	2

=== First round ===
==== Poland vs. Belgium ====
Poland
0
Legia Warsaw, Warsaw, Poland
6–8 May 1983
Clay

Belgium
5

			1	2	3	4	5
1	(Poland) (Belgium)	Waldemar Rogowski; Jan Vanlangendonck	6; 8	8; 6	1; 6	4; 6
2	(Poland) (Belgium)	Lech Bieńkowski; Bernard Boileau	0; 6	2; 6	2; 6
3	(Poland) (Belgium)	Lech Bieńkowski / Henryk Drzymalski; Bernard Boileau / Jacques Grandjean	2; 6	5; 7	4; 6
4	(Poland) (Belgium)	Waldemar Rogowski; Bernard Boileau	3; 6	2; 6
5	(Poland) (Belgium)	Lech Bieńkowski; Jan Vanlangendonck	7; 5	6; 8	2; 6

==== Monaco vs. Luxembourg ====
Monaco
4
Monte Carlo, Monaco
6–8 May 1983
Clay

Luxembourg
1

			1	2	3	4	5
1	(Monaco) (Luxembourg)	Bernard Balleret; Marc Klensch	6; 0	6; 3	6; 2
2	(Monaco) (Luxembourg)	Michel Borfiga; Johny Goudenbour	6; 3	10; 8	6; 1
3	(Monaco) (Luxembourg)	Bernard Balleret / Jacques Vinciléoni; Johny Goudenbour / Marc Klensch	6; 1	6; 4	6; 2
4	(Monaco) (Luxembourg)	Michel Borfiga; Marc Klensch	6; 2	6; 3
5	(Monaco) (Luxembourg)	Albert Viviani; Johny Goudenbour	8; 6	4; 6	5; 7

==== Portugal vs. Netherlands ====
Portugal
1
Clube de Ténis do Estoril, Estoril, Portugal
6–8 May 1983
Clay

Netherlands
4

			1	2	3	4	5
1	(Portugal) (Netherlands)	Pedro Cordeiro; Michiel Schapers	2; 6	4; 6	4; 6
2	(Portugal) (Netherlands)	Manuel de Sousa; Eric Wilborts	2; 6	3; 6	5; 7
3	(Portugal) (Netherlands)	José Manuel Cordeiro / Pedro Cordeiro; Michiel Schapers / Ton Sie	6; 8	4; 6	4; 6
4	(Portugal) (Netherlands)	Manuel de Sousa; Michiel Schapers	2; 6	2; 6
5	(Portugal) (Netherlands)	Pedro Cordeiro; Eric Wilborts	5; 7	6; 1	6; 1

=== Quarterfinals ===
==== Belgium vs. West Germany ====
Belgium
0
Tennisclub Eupen, Eupen, Belgium
10–12 June 1983
Clay

West Germany
5

			1	2	3	4	5
1	(Belgium) (West Germany)	Jan Vanlangendonck; Michael Westphal	3; 6	4; 6	6; 4	1; 6
2	(Belgium) (West Germany)	Jacques Grandjean; Damir Keretić	6; 4	1; 6	3; 6	1; 6
3	(Belgium) (West Germany)	Jacques Grandjean / Jan Vanlangendonck; Andreas Maurer / Wolfgang Popp	4; 6	4; 6	1; 6
4	(Belgium) (West Germany)	Jan Vanlangendonck; Damir Keretić	4; 6	6; 3	6; 8	1; 6
5	(Belgium) (West Germany)	Jacques Grandjean; Michael Westphal	5; 7	2; 6

==== Monaco vs. Israel ====
Monaco
1
Monte Carlo, Monaco
10–12 June 1983
Clay

Israel
4

			1	2	3	4	5
1	(Monaco) (Israel)	Bernard Balleret; Shlomo Glickstein	5; 7	2; 6	2; 6
2	(Monaco) (Israel)	Eric Carlier; Shahar Perkiss	3; 6	3; 6	1; 6
3	(Monaco) (Israel)	Bernard Balleret / Jacques Vinciléoni; Shlomo Glickstein / David Schneider	6; 1	4; 6	2; 6	11; 13
4	(Monaco) (Israel)	Bernard Balleret; Shahar Perkiss	6; 3	6; 2	6; 4
5	(Monaco) (Israel)	Eric Carlier; Shlomo Glickstein	2; 6	4; 6	4; 6

==== Egypt vs. Netherlands ====
Egypt
1
Gezira Sporting Club, Cairo, Egypt
10–12 June 1983
Clay

Netherlands
4

			1	2	3	4	5
1	(Egypt) (Netherlands)	Ahmed El-Mehelmy; Huub van Boeckel	4; 6	3; 6	6; 4	3; 6
2	(Egypt) (Netherlands)	Khaled Baligh; Michiel Schapers	2; 6	4; 6	3; 6
3	(Egypt) (Netherlands)	Khaled Baligh / Ahmed El-Mehelmy; Huub van Boeckel / Michiel Schapers	2; 6	4; 6	2; 6
4	(Egypt) (Netherlands)	Khaled Baligh; Huub van Boeckel	6; 2	4; 6	2; 6
5	(Egypt) (Netherlands)	Ahmed El-Mehelmy; Michiel Schapers	6; 4	6; 1

==== Switzerland vs. Greece ====
Switzerland
5
Sportcenter Flamingo, Ostermundigen, Switzerland
10–12 June 1983
Clay

Greece
0

			1	2	3	4	5
1	(Switzerland) (Greece)	Roland Stadler; Fotis Vazeos	6; 2	6; 4	6; 1
2	(Switzerland) (Greece)	Heinz Günthardt; George Kalovelonis	6; 1	6; 3	6; 0
3	(Switzerland) (Greece)	Heinz Günthardt / Markus Günthardt; George Kalovelonis / Fotis Vazeos	6; 2	6; 4	6; 1
4	(Switzerland) (Greece)	Heinz Günthardt; Fotis Vazeos	6; 1	6; 2
5	(Switzerland) (Greece)	Roland Stadler; George Kalovelonis	6; 1	2; 6	6; 4

=== Semifinals ===
==== Israel vs. West Germany ====
Israel
2
Canada Stadium, Ramat HaSharon, Israel
8–10 July 1983
Hard

West Germany
3

			1	2	3	4	5
1	(Israel) (West Germany)	David Schneider; Damir Keretić	6; 1	4; 6	2; 6	2; 6
2	(Israel) (West Germany)	Shlomo Glickstein; Michael Westphal	7; 9	6; 1	6; 4	4; 6	3; 6
3	(Israel) (West Germany)	Shlomo Glickstein / Shahar Perkiss; Andreas Maurer / Wolfgang Popp	6; 4	8; 10	7; 5	7; 5
4	(Israel) (West Germany)	Shahar Perkiss; Michael Westphal	6; 2	0; 6	5; 7	9; 11
5	(Israel) (West Germany)	Shlomo Glickstein; Damir Keretić	6; 4	6; 4

==== Switzerland vs. Netherlands ====
Switzerland
3
Tennis Club Lido Lugano, Lugano, Switzerland
8–10 July 1983
Clay

Netherlands
1

			1	2	3	4	5
1	(Switzerland) (Netherlands)	Heinz Günthardt; Huub van Boeckel	5; 7	6; 1	8; 6	6; 0
2	(Switzerland) (Netherlands)	Roland Stadler; Michiel Schapers	6; 1	6; 2	6; 1
3	(Switzerland) (Netherlands)	Heinz Günthardt / Markus Günthardt; Huub van Boeckel / Michiel Schapers	6; 4	6; 3	6; 8	5; 7	7; 9
4	(Switzerland) (Netherlands)	Roland Stadler; Huub van Boeckel	6; 4	6; 4	6; 8	6; 4
5	(Switzerland) (Netherlands)	Heinz Günthardt; Michiel Schapers						not played

=== Final ===
==== West Germany vs. Switzerland ====
West Germany
3
Freiburg, West Germany
30 September–2 October 1983
Clay

Switzerland
2

			1	2	3	4	5
1	(West Germany) (Switzerland)	Michael Westphal; Heinz Günthardt	2; 6	2; 6	8; 6	6; 2	2; 6
2	(West Germany) (Switzerland)	Damir Keretić; Roland Stadler	6; 0	6; 3	5; 7	1; 6	6; 2
3	(West Germany) (Switzerland)	Andreas Maurer / Wolfgang Popp; Heinz Günthardt / Markus Günthardt	6; 2	2; 6	6; 1	6; 2
4	(West Germany) (Switzerland)	Michael Westphal; Roland Stadler	7; 5	6; 2	8; 10	6; 2
5	(West Germany) (Switzerland)	Damir Keretić; Heinz Günthardt	3; 6	5; 7

== Zone B ==
=== Draw ===
First round 4–8 May
Hungary
bye
Istanbul, Turkey (clay)
Zimbabwe	5
Turkey	0
Ternitz, Austria (indoor hard)
Austria	5
Morocco	0
Norway	w/o
Libya
Algiers, Algeria (clay)
Algeria	1
Bulgaria	4
bye
Finland
Zagreb, Yugoslavia (clay)
Tunisia	0
Yugoslavia	3
bye
Spain

Quarterfinals; 10–12 June
Budapest, Hungary (clay)
Hungary	4
Zimbabwe	1
Oslo, Norway (clay)
Austria
Norway
Sofia, Bulgaria (clay)
Bulgaria	3
Finland	2
Madrid, Spain (clay)
Yugoslavia	3
Spain	2

Semifinals; 8–10 July
Pörtschach, Austria (clay)
Hungary	3
Austria	2
Sofia, Bulgaria (clay)
Bulgaria	0
Yugoslavia	5

Final; 30 September–2 October
Zagreb, Yugoslavia (clay)
Hungary	0
Yugoslavia	4

=== First round ===
==== Turkey vs. Zimbabwe ====
Turkey
0
T.E.D. Club, Istanbul, Turkey
6–8 May 1983
Clay

Zimbabwe
5

			1	2	3	4	5
1	(Turkey) (Zimbabwe)	Necvet Demir; Orlando Lourenco	1; 6	3; 6	1; 6
2	(Turkey) (Zimbabwe)	Metin Gürel; Philip Tuckniss	2; 6	1; 6	2; 6
3	(Turkey) (Zimbabwe)	Muzaffar Arpacoglou / Yavuz Erkangil; Haroon Ismail / Philip Tuckniss	3; 6	4; 6	4; 6
4	(Turkey) (Zimbabwe)	Necvet Demir; Philip Tuckniss	4; 6	6; 2	0; 6
5	(Turkey) (Zimbabwe)	Metin Gürel; Orlando Lourenco	0; 6	2; 6

==== Austria vs. Morocco ====
Austria
5
Sportshalle, Ternitz, Austria
6–8 May 1983
Hard (indoors)

Morocco
0

			1	2	3	4	5
1	(Austria) (Morocco)	Gerald Mild; Houcine Saber	6; 1	3; 6	6; 4	6; 1
2	(Austria) (Morocco)	Robert Reininger; Omar Laimina	6; 2	7; 5	6; 4
3	(Austria) (Morocco)	Hans Kary / Gerald Mild; Mohammed Dlimi / Omar Laimina	6; 2	4; 6	6; 4	6; 3
4	(Austria) (Morocco)	Gerald Mild; Omar Laimina	3; 6	6; 3	6; 1
5	(Austria) (Morocco)	Robert Reininger; Houcine Saber	6; 1	7; 5

==== Algeria vs. Bulgaria ====
Algeria
1
Tennis Club Bachdjarah, Algiers, Algeria
4–6 May 1983
Clay

Bulgaria
4

			1	2	3	4	5
1	(Algeria) (Bulgaria)	Djamel Boudjemline; Julian Stamatov	4; 6	1; 6	1; 6
2	(Algeria) (Bulgaria)	Kamel Harrad; Krassimir Lazarov	3; 6	0; 6	1; 6
3	(Algeria) (Bulgaria)	Nacir Abbes / Mohammed Bouabdallah; Marian Lazarov / Julian Stamatov	2; 6	5; 7	3; 6
4	(Algeria) (Bulgaria)	Kamel Harrad; Julian Stamatov	4; 6	1; 6	2; 6
5	(Algeria) (Bulgaria)	Djamel Boudjemline; Krassimir Lazarov	10; 8	6; 3	6; 4

==== Yugoslavia vs. Tunisia ====
Yugoslavia
3
Tenis klub Medveščak, Zagreb, Yugoslavia
6–8 May 1983
Clay

Tunisia
0

			1	2	3	4	5
1	(Socialist Federal Republic of Yugoslavia) (Tunisia)	Slobodan Živojinović; Hichem Riani	6; 2	6; 2	6; 2
2	(Socialist Federal Republic of Yugoslavia) (Tunisia)	Marko Ostoja; Abdel-Majid Soudani	6; 0	6; 2	5; 2			retired
3	(Socialist Federal Republic of Yugoslavia) (Tunisia)	Marko Ostoja / Slobodan Živojinović; Monir Ben Aziza / Hichem Riani	6; 2	6; 2	6; 3
4	(Socialist Federal Republic of Yugoslavia) (Tunisia)	Slobodan Živojinović; Abdel-Majid Soudani						not played
5	(Socialist Federal Republic of Yugoslavia) (Tunisia)	Marko Ostoja; Hichem Riani						not played

=== Quarterfinals ===
==== Hungary vs. Zimbabwe ====
Hungary
4
Budapest, Hungary
10–12 June 1983
Clay

Zimbabwe
1

			1	2	3	4	5
1	(Hungary) (Zimbabwe)	Róbert Machán; Haroon Ismail	6; 1	6; 2	6; 8	4; 6	0; 6
2	(Hungary) (Zimbabwe)	Balázs Taróczy; Philip Tuckniss	6; 4	6; 2	6; 0
3	(Hungary) (Zimbabwe)	Péter Szőke / Balázs Taróczy; Haroon Ismail / Philip Tuckniss	6; 2	6; 1	7; 5
4	(Hungary) (Zimbabwe)	Róbert Machán; Philip Tuckniss	6; 4	6; 0	7; 5
5	(Hungary) (Zimbabwe)	Balázs Taróczy; Haroon Ismail	6; 2	7; 5

==== Norway vs. Austria ====
Norway
1
Oslo Tennisklubb, Oslo, Norway
10–12 June 1983
Clay

Austria
4

			1	2	3	4	5
1	(Norway) (Austria)	Tony Jønsson; Robert Reininger	2; 6	6; 8	6; 4	1; 6
2	(Norway) (Austria)	Morten Rønneberg; Klaus Oberparleiter	5; 7	6; 8	5; 7
3	(Norway) (Austria)	Terje Persson / Morten Rønneberg; Hans Kary / Robert Reininger	1; 6	6; 3	7; 5	4; 6	2; 6
4	(Norway) (Austria)	Per Hegna; Robert Reininger	6; 4	6; 3
5	(Norway) (Austria)	Tony Jønsson; Gerald Mild	2; 6	4; 6

==== Bulgaria vs. Finland ====
Bulgaria
3
Levski Sofia, Sofia, Bulgaria
10–12 June 1983
Clay

Finland
2

			1	2	3	4	5
1	(Bulgaria) (Finland)	Lyubomir Petrov; Leo Palin	4; 6	2; 6	6; 4	4; 6
2	(Bulgaria) (Finland)	Krassimir Lazarov; Olli Rahnasto	6; 4	4; 6	6; 4	3; 6	6; 3
3	(Bulgaria) (Finland)	Krassimir Lazarov / Marian Lazarov; Kimmo Alkio / Leo Palin	4; 6	6; 4	6; 3	6; 4
4	(Bulgaria) (Finland)	Lyubomir Petrov; Olli Rahnasto	6; 4	1; 6	3; 6	6; 2	3; 6
5	(Bulgaria) (Finland)	Krassimir Lazarov; Leo Palin	6; 1	6; 2	6; 8	4; 6	6; 0

==== Spain vs. Yugoslavia ====
Spain
2
Club Internacional de Tenis de Majadahonda, Madrid, Spain
10–12 June 1983
Clay

Yugoslavia
3

			1	2	3	4	5
1	(Spain) (Socialist Federal Republic of Yugoslavia)	Sergio Casal; Marko Ostoja	6; 1	6; 4	3; 6	1; 6	3; 6
2	(Spain) (Socialist Federal Republic of Yugoslavia)	Juan Avendaño; Slobodan Živojinović	6; 1	4; 6	4; 6	6; 3	6; 1
3	(Spain) (Socialist Federal Republic of Yugoslavia)	Juan Aguilera / Sergio Casal; Marko Ostoja / Slobodan Živojinović	6; 2	14; 16	4; 6	6; 1	6; 8
4	(Spain) (Socialist Federal Republic of Yugoslavia)	Sergio Casal; Slobodan Živojinović	7; 5	6; 3	4; 6	3; 6	4; 6
5	(Spain) (Socialist Federal Republic of Yugoslavia)	Alberto Tous; Goran Prpić	3; 6	6; 3	6; 3

=== Semifinals ===
==== Austria vs. Hungary ====
Austria
2
Werzer Arena, Pörtschach, Austria
8–10 July 1983
Clay

Hungary
3

			1	2	3	4	5
1	(Austria) (Hungary)	Bernhard Pils; Róbert Machán	4; 6	6; 2	6; 1	8; 10	6; 4
2	(Austria) (Hungary)	Peter Feigl; Balázs Taróczy	1; 6	4; 6	6; 3	4; 6
3	(Austria) (Hungary)	Peter Feigl / Gerald Mild; Péter Szőke / Balázs Taróczy	4; 6	2; 6	6; 4	4; 6
4	(Austria) (Hungary)	Bernhard Pils; Balázs Taróczy	1; 6	4; 6	6; 3	4; 6
5	(Austria) (Hungary)	Peter Feigl; Róbert Machán	6; 8	2; 6	7; 5	6; 1	6; 2

==== Bulgaria vs. Yugoslavia ====
Bulgaria
0
Levski Sofia, Sofia, Bulgaria
8–10 July 1983
Clay

Yugoslavia
5

			1	2	3	4	5
1	(Bulgaria) (Socialist Federal Republic of Yugoslavia)	Krassimir Lazarov; Marko Ostoja	6; 1	3; 6	6; 4	4; 6	3; 6
2	(Bulgaria) (Socialist Federal Republic of Yugoslavia)	Julian Stamatov; Slobodan Živojinović	3; 6	4; 6	2; 6
3	(Bulgaria) (Socialist Federal Republic of Yugoslavia)	Krassimir Lazarov / Marian Lazarov; Slobodan Živojinović / Marko Ostoja	4; 6	6; 3	1; 6	6; 2	4; 6
4	(Bulgaria) (Socialist Federal Republic of Yugoslavia)	Marian Lazarov; Goran Prpić	2; 6	4; 6
5	(Bulgaria) (Socialist Federal Republic of Yugoslavia)	Julian Stamatov; Marko Ostoja	5; 7	3; 6

=== Final ===
==== Yugoslavia vs. Hungary ====
Yugoslavia
4
Tenis klub Medveščak, Zagreb, Yugoslavia
30 September–2 October 1983
Clay

Hungary
0

			1	2	3	4	5
1	(Socialist Federal Republic of Yugoslavia) (Hungary)	Marko Ostoja; Róbert Machán	6; 0	3; 6	6; 2	6; 2
2	(Socialist Federal Republic of Yugoslavia) (Hungary)	Slobodan Živojinović; János Benyik	6; 3	2; 6	6; 2	7; 5
3	(Socialist Federal Republic of Yugoslavia) (Hungary)	Slobodan Živojinović / Marko Ostoja; Róbert Machán / Péter Szőke	6; 4	6; 3	10; 12	6; 3
4	(Socialist Federal Republic of Yugoslavia) (Hungary)	Marko Ostoja; János Benyik	7; 5	6; 2
5	(Socialist Federal Republic of Yugoslavia) (Hungary)	Slobodan Živojinović; Róbert Machán						not played
