= 1984 Donnay Indoor Championships – Singles =

Singles
- 1984 Donnay Indoor Championships

Final
- Champion: (United States) John McEnroe
- Runner-up: (Czechoslovakia) Ivan Lendl
- Score: 6–1, 6–3

Events
Singles	Doubles
← 1983 ·	Donnay Indoor Championships	· 1985 →

Peter McNamara was the defending champion, but did not participate this year.

John McEnroe won the title, defeating Ivan Lendl 6–1, 6–3 in the final.

== Seeds ==
1. (Czechoslovakia) Ivan Lendl (final)
2. (United States) John McEnroe (champion)
3. (Sweden) Mats Wilander (first round)
4. (South Africa) Kevin Curren (first round)
5. (United States) Eliot Teltscher (second round)
6. (United States) Bill Scanlon (first round)
7. (United States) Johan Kriek (quarterfinals)
8. (United States) Gene Mayer (quarterfinals)

== Draw ==
=== Key ===
- Q = Qualifier
- WC = Wild card
- LL = Lucky loser
- Alt = Alternate
- SE = Special exempt
- PR = Protected ranking
- ITF = ITF entry
- JE = Junior exempt
- w/o = Walkover
- r = Retired
- d = Defaulted
- SR = Special ranking

=== Finals ===
Semifinals
1	(Czechoslovakia) Ivan Lendl	6	6
(Czechoslovakia) Tomáš Šmíd	1	2
Q	(Sweden) Thomas Högstedt	3	1
2	(United States) John McEnroe	6	6

Final
1	(Czechoslovakia) Ivan Lendl	1	3
2	(United States) John McEnroe	6	6

=== Top half ===
First round
1	(Czechoslovakia) I Lendl	6	6
Q	(United States) B Gilbert	1	0
(Sweden) A Järryd	0	6	6
(Poland) W Fibak	6	4	0
(United States) S Davis	3	4
Q	(Australia) P Cash	6	6
(France) H Leconte	4	3
8	(United States) G Mayer	6	6
3	(Sweden) M Wilander	5	5
(Czechoslovakia) T Šmid	7	7
(United States) B Teacher	2	5
(United States) H Pfister	6	7
(United States) M Purcell	0	6	1
(Switzerland) H Günthardt	6	0	6
(Sweden) H Sundström	7	2	7
6	(United States) B Scanlon	6	6	6

Second round
1	(Czechoslovakia) I Lendl	6	6
(Sweden) A Järryd	4	2
Q	(Australia) P Cash	3	3
8	(United States) G Mayer	6	6
(Czechoslovakia) T Šmid	6	2	6
(United States) H Pfister	3	6	0
(Switzerland) H Günthardt	3	1
(Sweden) H Sundström	6	6

Quarterfinals
1	(Czechoslovakia) I Lendl	6	6
8	(United States) G Mayer	3	4
(Czechoslovakia) T Šmid	6	6
(Sweden) H Sundström	0	4

Semifinals
1	(Czechoslovakia) I Lendl	6	6
(Czechoslovakia) T Šmid	1	2

=== Bottom half ===
First round
5	(United States) E Teltscher	6	3	6
(Sweden) J Nyström	3	6	2
(Belgium) J Vanlangendonck	6	5	5
Q	(Sweden) T Högstedt	4	7	7
(Belgium) K Demuynck	6	1	4
(United States) R Van't Hof	4	6	6
(Belgium) B Boileau	6	6
4	(South Africa) K Curren	3	4
7	(United States) J Kriek	6	3	6
(United States) B Gottfried	3	6	4
(United States) V Gerulaitis	6	6
(United Kingdom) C Dowdeswell	2	3
(United States) T Gullikson	7	2	4
Q	(Socialist Federal Republic of Yugoslavia) M Ostoja	6	6	6
(United States) T Mayotte	1	1
2	(United States) J McEnroe	6	6

Second round
5	(United States) E Teltscher	4	3
Q	(Sweden) T Högstedt	6	6
(United States) R Van't Hof	5	6	1
(Belgium) B Boileau	7	3	6
7	(United States) J Kriek	6	6
(United States) V Gerulaitis	4	4
Q	(Socialist Federal Republic of Yugoslavia) M Ostoja	1	2
2	(United States) J McEnroe	6	6

Quarterfinals
Q	(Sweden) T Högstedt	6	4	6
(Belgium) B Boileau	4	6	3
7	(United States) J Kriek	3	1
2	(United States) J McEnroe	6	6

Semifinals
Q	(Sweden) T Högstedt	3	1
2	(United States) J McEnroe	6	6
