= 1985 Donnay Indoor Championships – Doubles =

Doubles
- 1985 Donnay Indoor Championships

Final
- Champions: (Sweden) Stefan Edberg (Sweden) Anders Järryd
- Runners-up: (South Africa) Kevin Curren (Poland) Wojtek Fibak
- Score: 6–3, 7–6

Details
- Draw: 16
- Seeds: 4

Events
Singles	Doubles
- Donnay Indoor Championships

Tim Gullikson and Tom Gullikson were the defending champions, but did not participate this year.

Stefan Edberg and Anders Järryd won the title, defeating Kevin Curren and Wojtek Fibak 6–3, 7–6 in the final.

== Seeds ==
1. (Czechoslovakia) Pavel Složil / (Czechoslovakia) Tomáš Šmíd (semifinals)
2. (Switzerland) Heinz Günthardt / (France) Henri Leconte (semifinals)
3. (Sweden) Stefan Edberg / (Sweden) Anders Järryd (champions)
4. (Australia) Mark Edmondson / (Australia) Kim Warwick (first round)

== Draw ==
Key

- Q = Qualifier
- WC = Wild card
- LL = Lucky loser
- Alt = Alternate
- ITF = ITF entry
- PR = Protected ranking
- SR = Special ranking
- SE = Special exempt
- JE = Junior exempt
- JR = Junior Accelerator Programme entrant
- CO = College Accelerator Programme entrant
- NG = Next Gen Accelerator Program entrant
- w/o = Walkover
- r = Retired
- d = Defaulted

=== Draw ===
First round
1	(Czechoslovakia) P Složil (Czechoslovakia) T Šmíd	6	6
WC	(Belgium) A Brichant (Belgium) J Vanlangendonck	3	0
(United States) M De Palmer (United States) T Wilkison	7	6	3
(Australia) P Cash (Australia) P McNamee	6	7	6
3	(Sweden) S Edberg (Sweden) A Järryd	5	6	6
(West Germany) B Becker (United Kingdom) J Lloyd	7	3	4
(United States) S Giammalva Jr. (United States) S Meister	7	4	6
(Australia) B Dyke (Australia) J Fitzgerald	6	6	3
(Sweden) J Nyström (Sweden) M Wilander	4	6	2
(South Africa) K Curren (Poland) W Fibak	6	4	6
LL	(Switzerland) M Günthardt (Hungary) Z Kuharszky	4	7	6
4	(Australia) M Edmondson (Australia) K Warwick	6	6	3
(Sweden) J Gunnarsson (Denmark) M Mortensen	7	7
(Australia) D Graham (Australia) L Warder	5	6
(Paraguay) F González (United States) M Mitchell	4	6
2	(Switzerland) H Günthardt (France) H Leconte	6	7

Quarterfinals
1	(Czechoslovakia) P Složil (Czechoslovakia) T Šmíd	6	7
(Australia) P Cash (Australia) P McNamee	2	5
3	(Sweden) S Edberg (Sweden) A Järryd	5	6	6
(United States) S Giammalva Jr. (United States) S Meister	7	3	4
(South Africa) K Curren (Poland) W Fibak	6	4	6
LL	(Switzerland) M Günthardt (Hungary) Z Kuharszky	4	6	2
(Sweden) J Gunnarsson (Denmark) M Mortensen	4	6
2	(Switzerland) H Günthardt (France) H Leconte	6	7

Semifinals
1	(Czechoslovakia) P Složil (Czechoslovakia) T Šmíd	2	3
3	(Sweden) S Edberg (Sweden) A Järryd	6	6
(South Africa) K Curren (Poland) W Fibak	7	6	6
2	(Switzerland) H Günthardt (France) H Leconte	6	7	1

Final
3	(Sweden) S Edberg (Sweden) A Järryd	6	7
(South Africa) K Curren (Poland) W Fibak	3	6
