= 1984 Donnay Indoor Championships =

- Date: 5–11 March 1984
- Edition: 4th
- Category: Grand Prix
- Draw: 32S / 16D
- Prize money: $250,000
- Surface: Carpet / indoor
- Location: Brussels, Belgium

Champions

Singles
- (United States) John McEnroe

Doubles
- (United States) Tim Gullikson / (United States) Tom Gullikson
← 1983 ·	Donnay Indoor Championships	· 1985 →

The 1984 Donnay Indoor Championships was a men's tennis tournament played on indoor carpet courts in Brussels in Belgium the event was part of the 1984 Volvo Grand Prix. It was the fourth edition of the tournament and was held from 5 March until 11 March 1984. Second-seeded John McEnroe won the singles title.

== Finals ==
=== Singles ===
(United States) John McEnroe defeated (Czechoslovakia) Ivan Lendl, 6–1, 6–3

- It was McEnroe's 4th singles title of the year and the 50th of his career.

=== Doubles ===
(United States) Tim Gullikson / (United States) Tom Gullikson defeated (South Africa) Kevin Curren / (United States) Steve Denton, 6–4, 6–7, 7–6

== See also ==
- Lendl–McEnroe rivalry
