= 1984 Donnay Indoor Championships – Doubles =

Doubles
- 1984 Donnay Indoor Championships

Final
- Champions: (United States) Tim Gullikson (United States) Tom Gullikson
- Runners-up: (South Africa) Kevin Curren (United States) Steve Denton
- Score: 6–4, 6–7, 7–6

Events
Singles	Doubles
← 1983 ·	Donnay Indoor Championships	· 1985 →

Heinz Günthardt and Balázs Taróczy were the defending champions, but lost in the semifinals this year.

Tim Gullikson and Tom Gullikson won the title, defeating Kevin Curren and Steve Denton 6–4, 6–7, 7–6 in the final.

== Seeds ==
1. (Australia) Mark Edmondson / (United States) Sherwood Stewart (quarterfinals)
2. (Sweden) Anders Järryd / (Sweden) Hans Simonsson (semifinals)
3. (United States) Tim Gullikson / (United States) Tom Gullikson (champions)
4. (Czechoslovakia) Pavel Složil / (Czechoslovakia) Tomáš Šmíd (quarterfinals)

== Draw ==
=== Key ===
- Q = Qualifier
- WC = Wild card
- LL = Lucky loser
- Alt = Alternate
- SE = Special exempt
- PR = Protected ranking
- ITF = ITF entry
- JE = Junior exempt
- w/o = Walkover
- r = Retired
- d = Defaulted
- SR = Special ranking

=== Draw ===
First round
1	(Australia) M Edmondson (United States) S Stewart	1	7	6
(Poland) W Fibak (Australia) L Warder	6	6	4
(Australia) P Cash (Australia) J Fitzgerald	1	7	2
(Switzerland) H Günthardt (Hungary) B Taróczy	6	6	6
3	(United States) Ti Gullikson (United States) To Gullikson	6	7
(United States) F Buehning (United States) F Taygan	4	6
(United States) V Amaya (United States) B Gottfried	5	4
(United States) E Fromm (United States) S Meister	7	6
(France) H Leconte (United States) P Rennert	4	4
(South Africa) K Curren (United States) S Denton	6	6
(United States) T Delatte (United States) J Kriek	6	1	6
4	(Czechoslovakia) P Složil (Czechoslovakia) T Šmíd	3	6	7
(Belgium) B Boileau (United States) V Gerulaitis	1	6	4
(United States) S Davis (United States) B Teacher	6	1	6
(Australia) B Dyke (Australia) R Frawley	4	1
2	(Sweden) A Järryd (Sweden) H Simonsson	6	6

Quarterfinals
1	(Australia) M Edmondson (United States) S Stewart	2	5
(Switzerland) H Günthardt (Hungary) B Taróczy	6	7
3	(United States) Ti Gullikson (United States) To Gullikson	7	6
(United States) E Fromm (United States) S Meister	6	4
(South Africa) K Curren (United States) S Denton	7	6
4	(Czechoslovakia) P Složil (Czechoslovakia) T Šmíd	6	4
(United States) S Davis (United States) B Teacher	6	4
2	(Sweden) A Järryd (Sweden) H Simonsson	7	6

Semifinals
(Switzerland) H Günthardt (Hungary) B Taróczy	6	3
3	(United States) Ti Gullikson (United States) To Gullikson	7	6
(South Africa) K Curren (United States) S Denton	7	6
2	(Sweden) A Järryd (Sweden) H Simonsson	5	1

Final
3	(United States) Ti Gullikson (United States) To Gullikson	6	6	7
(South Africa) K Curren (United States) S Denton	4	7	6
