= 1986 Donnay Indoor Championships – Doubles =

Tennis tournament event

Doubles
- 1986 Donnay Indoor Championships

Final
- Champions: (West Germany) Boris Becker (Socialist Federal Republic of Yugoslavia) Slobodan Živojinović
- Runners-up: (Australia) John Fitzgerald (Czechoslovakia) Tomáš Šmíd
- Score: 7–6, 7–5

Details
- Draw: 16
- Seeds: 4

Events
Singles	Doubles
- Donnay Indoor Championships

Stefan Edberg and Anders Järryd were the defending champions, but Edberg did not participate this year. Järryd partnered with Guy Forget, losing in the semifinals.

Boris Becker and Slobodan Živojinović won the title, defeating John Fitzgerald and Tomáš Šmíd 7–6, 7–5 in the final.

== Seeds ==
1. (France) Guy Forget / (Sweden) Anders Järryd (semifinals)
2. (Sweden) Joakim Nyström / (Sweden) Mats Wilander (first round)
3. (Australia) Mark Edmondson / (Australia) Kim Warwick (first round)
4. (Australia) John Fitzgerald / (Czechoslovakia) Tomáš Šmíd (final)

== Draw ==
Key

- Q = Qualifier
- WC = Wild card
- LL = Lucky loser
- Alt = Alternate
- ITF = ITF entry
- PR = Protected ranking
- SR = Special ranking
- SE = Special exempt
- JE = Junior exempt
- JR = Junior Accelerator Programme entrant
- CO = College Accelerator Programme entrant
- NG = Next Gen Accelerator Program entrant
- w/o = Walkover
- r = Retired
- d = Defaulted

=== Draw ===
First round
1	(France) G Forget (Sweden) A Järryd	6	6
(United States) K Curren (Switzerland) H Günthardt	3	3
(Israel) S Glickstein (Israel) A Mansdorf	2	6	7
(United States) V Gerulaitis (Israel) S Perkiss	6	3	6
4	(Australia) J Fitzgerald (Czechoslovakia) T Šmíd	6	6
(Australia) B Dyke (Australia) W Masur	4	3
LL	(South Africa) B Levine (Australia) L Warder	6	7
(United States) M De Palmer (United States) G Donnelly	3	6
(New Zealand) K Everden (France) H Leconte	6	7
(Poland) W Fibak (United States) M Mitchell	3	5
(West Germany) B Becker (Socialist Federal Republic of Yugoslavia) S Živojinović	6	6	6
3	(Australia) M Edmondson (Australia) K Warwick	2	7	2
WC	(Belgium) A Brichant (Belgium) J Vanlangendonck	6	4	1
(Spain) S Casal (Spain) E Sánchez	1	6	6
(United States) M Dickson (Australia) B Drewett	6	2	6
2	(Sweden) J Nyström (Sweden) M Wilander	2	6	3

Quarterfinals
1	(France) G Forget (Sweden) A Järryd	6	6
(Israel) S Glickstein (Israel) A Mansdorf	3	2
4	(Australia) J Fitzgerald (Czechoslovakia) T Šmíd	6	6
LL	(South Africa) B Levine (Australia) L Warder	3	1
(New Zealand) K Everden (France) H Leconte	4	3
(West Germany) B Becker (Socialist Federal Republic of Yugoslavia) S Živojinović	6	6
(Spain) S Casal (Spain) E Sánchez	6	7
(United States) M Dickson (Australia) B Drewett	4	6

Semifinals
1	(France) G Forget (Sweden) A Järryd	3	6	5
4	(Australia) J Fitzgerald (Czechoslovakia) T Šmíd	6	4	7
(West Germany) B Becker (Socialist Federal Republic of Yugoslavia) S Živojinović	6	6
(Spain) S Casal (Spain) E Sánchez	4	4

Final
4	(Australia) J Fitzgerald (Czechoslovakia) T Šmíd	6	5
(West Germany) B Becker (Socialist Federal Republic of Yugoslavia) S Živojinović	7	7
