= 1981 Donnay Indoor Championships – Doubles =

Doubles
- 1981 Donnay Indoor Championships

Final
- Champions: (United States) Sandy Mayer (South Africa) Frew McMillan
- Runners-up: (South Africa) Kevin Curren (United States) Steve Denton
- Score: 4–6, 6–3, 6–3

Details
- Draw: 16
- Seeds: 4

Events
Singles	Doubles
- Donnay Indoor Championships

This was the first edition of the event.

Sandy Mayer and Frew McMillan won the title, defeating Tracy Delatte and Chris Dunk 4–6, 6–3, 6–3 in the final.

== Seeds ==
1. (United States) Brian Gottfried / (United States) Sherwood Stewart (semifinals)
2. (South Africa) Kevin Curren / (United States) Steve Denton (final)
3. (United States) Sandy Mayer / (South Africa) Frew McMillan (champions)
4. (Australia) Rod Frawley / (Ecuador) Andrés Gómez (first round)

== Draw ==
Key

- Q = Qualifier
- WC = Wild card
- LL = Lucky loser
- Alt = Alternate
- ITF = ITF entry
- PR = Protected ranking
- SR = Special ranking
- SE = Special exempt
- JE = Junior exempt
- JR = Junior Accelerator Programme entrant
- CO = College Accelerator Programme entrant
- NG = Next Gen Accelerator Program entrant
- w/o = Walkover
- r = Retired
- d = Defaulted

=== Draw ===
First round
1	(United States) B Gottfried (United States) S Stewart	4	7	6
(Czechoslovakia) P Složil (Czechoslovakia) T Šmíd	6	5	1
(Sweden) J Norbäck (South Africa) D Schneider	7	6
(West Germany) R Gehring (Brazil) M Hocevar	6	4
3	(United States) S Mayer (South Africa) F McMillan	6	6
(Brazil) C Kirmayr (Brazil) C Motta	3	4
(United States) A Kohlberg (United States) T Waltke	6	6
(Czechoslovakia) J Hřebec (Czechoslovakia) P Hutka	4	2
(United States) F Buehning (United States) F Taygan	7	6
(United States) C Edwards (South Africa) E Edwards	6	1
(United States) P DuPré (Australia) K Warwick	6	7	6
4	(Australia) R Frawley (Ecuador) A Gómez	7	6	2
(Belgium) B Boileau (Belgium) A Brichant	6	6
(United Kingdom) J Feaver (Switzerland) H Günthardt	3	4
(United States) F McNair (United States) B Scanlon	4	4
2	(South Africa) K Curren (United States) S Denton	6	6

Quarterfinals
1	(United States) B Gottfried (United States) S Stewart	6	6
(Sweden) J Norbäck (South Africa) D Schneider	1	3
3	(United States) S Mayer (South Africa) F McMillan	6	6
(United States) A Kohlberg (United States) T Waltke	1	4
(United States) F Buehning (United States) F Taygan	7	6
(United States) P DuPré (Australia) K Warwick	6	3
(Belgium) B Boileau (Belgium) A Brichant	3	1
2	(South Africa) K Curren (United States) S Denton	6	6

Semifinals
1	(United States) B Gottfried (United States) S Stewart	5	6	1
3	(United States) S Mayer (South Africa) F McMillan	7	4	6
(United States) F Buehning (United States) F Taygan	3	1
2	(South Africa) K Curren (United States) S Denton	6	6

Final
3	(United States) S Mayer (South Africa) F McMillan	4	6	6
2	(South Africa) K Curren (United States) S Denton	6	3	3
