= 1981 Donnay Indoor Championships =

- Date: 9–15 March
- Edition: 1st
- Category: Grand Prix circuit (WCT)
- Draw: 32S / 16D
- Prize money: $175,000
- Surface: Carpet / indoor
- Location: Brussels, Belgium

Champions

Singles
- (United States) Jimmy Connors

Doubles
- (United States) Sandy Mayer / (South Africa) Frew McMillan
- Donnay Indoor Championships

The 1981 Donnay Indoor Championships was a men's tennis tournament played on indoor carpet courts in Brussels, Belgium. It was a WCT tournament that was part of the 1981 Volvo Grand Prix circuit. It was the inaugural edition of the tournament and was held from 9 March until 15 March 1981. Second-seeded Jimmy Connors won the singles title.

== Finals ==
=== Singles ===
(United States) Jimmy Connors defeated (United States) Brian Gottfried, 6–2, 6–4, 6–3

- It was Connors' 2nd singles title of the year and the 87th of his career.

=== Doubles ===
(United States) Sandy Mayer / (South Africa) Frew McMillan defeated (South Africa) Kevin Curren / (United States) Steve Denton, 4–6, 6–3, 6–3
