= ATP Brussels =

ATP Brussels may refer to:

- Donnay Indoor Championships
- European Open (2025–present)
