= 1981 Donnay Indoor Championships – Singles =

Singles
- 1981 Donnay Indoor Championships

Final
- Champion: (United States) Jimmy Connors
- Runner-up: (United States) Brian Gottfried
- Score: 6–2, 6–4, 6–3

Details
- Draw: 32
- Seeds: 8

Events
Singles	Doubles
- Donnay Indoor Championships

This was the first edition of the event.

Jimmy Connors won the title, defeating Brian Gottfried 6–2, 6–4, 6–3 in the final.

== Seeds ==
1. (Sweden) Björn Borg (second round)
2. (United States) Jimmy Connors (champion)
3. (Poland) Wojtek Fibak (second round)
4. (United States) Brian Gottfried (final)
5. (India) Vijay Amritraj (quarterfinals)
6. (Czechoslovakia) Tomáš Šmíd (first round)
7. (Australia) Kim Warwick (quarterfinals, retired)
8. (Switzerland) Heinz Günthardt (first round)

== Draw ==
Key

- Q = Qualifier
- WC = Wild card
- LL = Lucky loser
- Alt = Alternate
- ITF = ITF entry
- PR = Protected ranking
- SR = Special ranking
- SE = Special exempt
- JE = Junior exempt
- JR = Junior Accelerator Programme entrant
- CO = College Accelerator Programme entrant
- NG = Next Gen Accelerator Program entrant
- w/o = Walkover
- r = Retired
- d = Defaulted

=== Finals ===
Semifinals
(West Germany) Rolf Gehring	2	4
4	(United States) Brian Gottfried	6	6
(United States) Sandy Mayer	2	2
2	(United States) Jimmy Connors	6	6

Final
4	(United States) Brian Gottfried	2	4	3
2	(United States) Jimmy Connors	6	6	6

=== Top half ===
First round
1	(Sweden) B Borg	6	6
(Belgium) B Boileau	3	3
(West Germany) R Gehring	6	7
(Brazil) M Hocevar	4	5
(Czechoslovakia) P Hutka	2	2
(United States) F Taygan	6	6
(Israel) S Glickstein	2	2
5	(India) V Amritraj	6	6
4	(United States) B Gottfried	4	6	6
(United States) B Scanlon	6	2	3
(Czechoslovakia) P Složil	6	6
(Bolivia) M Martinez	1	2
(United States) P Rennert	6	6
(United States) S Stewart	1	4
(Australia) R Frawley	6	6	7
8	(Switzerland) H Günthardt	3	7	6

Second round
1	(Sweden) B Borg	6	5
(West Germany) R Gehring	7	7
(United States) F Taygan	1	4
5	(India) V Amritraj	6	6
4	(United States) B Gottfried	6	3	6
(Czechoslovakia) P Složil	1	6	2
(United States) P Rennert	6	7
(Australia) R Frawley	3	6

Quarterfinals
(West Germany) R Gehring	6	1	6
5	(India) V Amritraj	2	6	3
4	(United States) B Gottfried	7	6
(United States) P Rennert	6	3

Semifinals
(West Germany) R Gehring	2	4
4	(United States) B Gottfried	6	6

=== Bottom half ===
First round
7	(Australia) K Warwick	4	6	7
(Belgium) A Brichant	6	1	5
(France) T Tulasne	2	5
(Belgium) T Stevaux	6	7
(West Germany) A Maurer	2	4
(United States) S Mayer	6	6
(United Kingdom) J Feaver	3	1
3	(Poland) W Fibak	6	6
6	(Czechoslovakia) T Šmíd	5	5
(United States) F Buehning	7	7
(France) P Portes	3	2
(United States) T Waltke	6	6
(Brazil) C Kirmayr	3	1
(United States) P Du Pré	6	6
(Ecuador) A Gómez	0	4
2	(United States) J Connors	6	6

Second round
7	(Australia) K Warwick	6	7
(Belgium) T Stevaux	2	6
(United States) S Mayer	7	6
3	(Poland) W Fibak	6	1
(United States) F Buehning	6	6
(United States) T Waltke	1	2
(United States) P Du Pré	6	3	3
2	(United States) J Connors	4	6	6

Quarterfinals
7	(Australia) K Warwick	1^{r}
(United States) S Mayer	4
(United States) F Buehning	3	5
2	(United States) J Connors	6	7

Semifinals
(United States) S Mayer	2	2
2	(United States) J Connors	6	6
