= 1985 Donnay Indoor Championships =

- Date: 11–17 March
- Edition: 5th
- Category: Grand Prix
- Draw: 32S / 16D
- Prize money: $210,000
- Surface: Carpet / indoor
- Location: Brussels, Belgium
- Venue: Forest National

Champions

Singles
- (Sweden) Anders Järryd

Doubles
- (Sweden) Stefan Edberg / (Sweden) Anders Järryd
- Donnay Indoor Championships

The 1985 Donnay Indoor Championships was a men's tennis tournament played on indoor carpet courts at the Forest National in Brussels, Belgium the event was part of the 1985 Nabisco Grand Prix. It was the fifth edition of the tournament and was held from 11 March until 17 March 1985. Second-seeded Anders Järryd won the singles title.

== Finals ==
=== Singles ===
(Sweden) Anders Järryd defeated (Sweden) Mats Wilander, 6–4, 3–6, 7–5

- It was Järryd's 1st singles title of the year and the 5th of his career.

=== Doubles ===
(Sweden) Stefan Edberg / (Sweden) Anders Järryd defeated (South Africa) Kevin Curren / (Poland) Wojciech Fibak, 6–3, 7–6

== Prize money ==
Event	W	F	SF	QF	Round of 16	Round of 32
Singles	$42,000	$21,000	$11,130	$5,985	$3,255	$1,785
Doubles*	$12,600	$6,300	$3,486	$2,184	$1,448	—N/a

_{*per team}
