= List of Belgium Davis Cup team representatives =

This is a list of tennis players who have represented the Belgium Davis Cup team in an official Davis Cup match. Belgium have taken part in the competition since 1904.

== Players ==
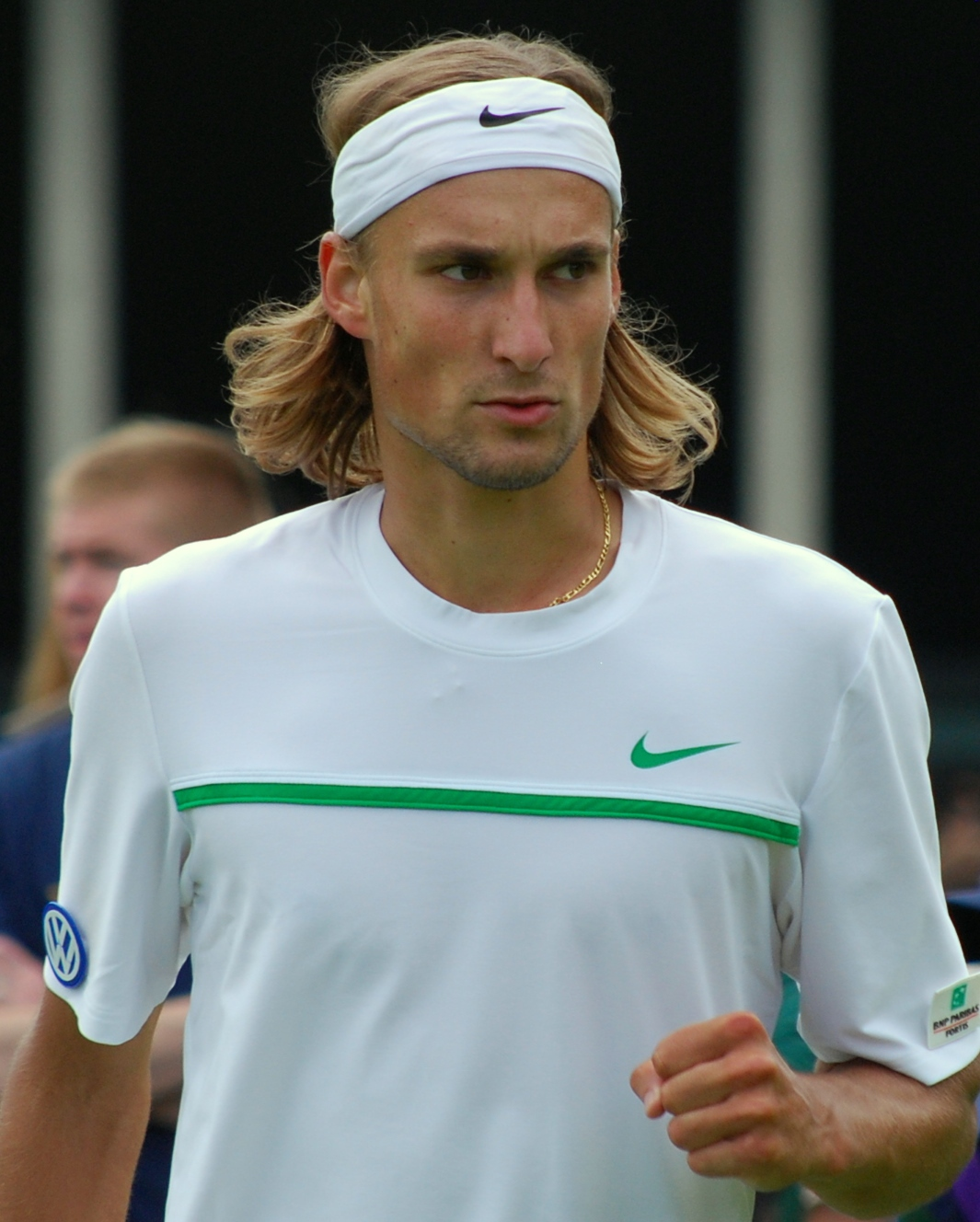
Ruben Bemelmans

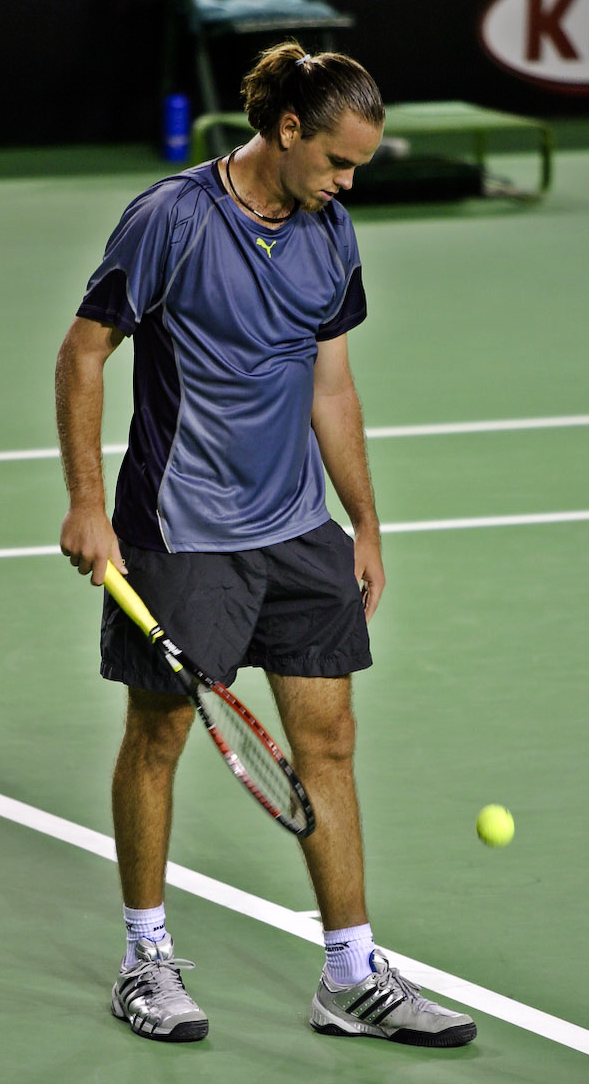
Xavier Malisse

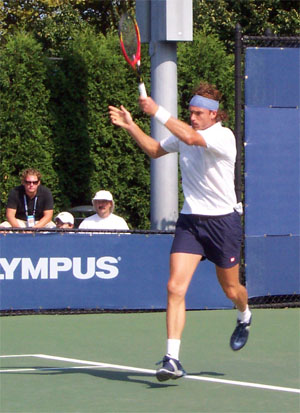
Dick Norman

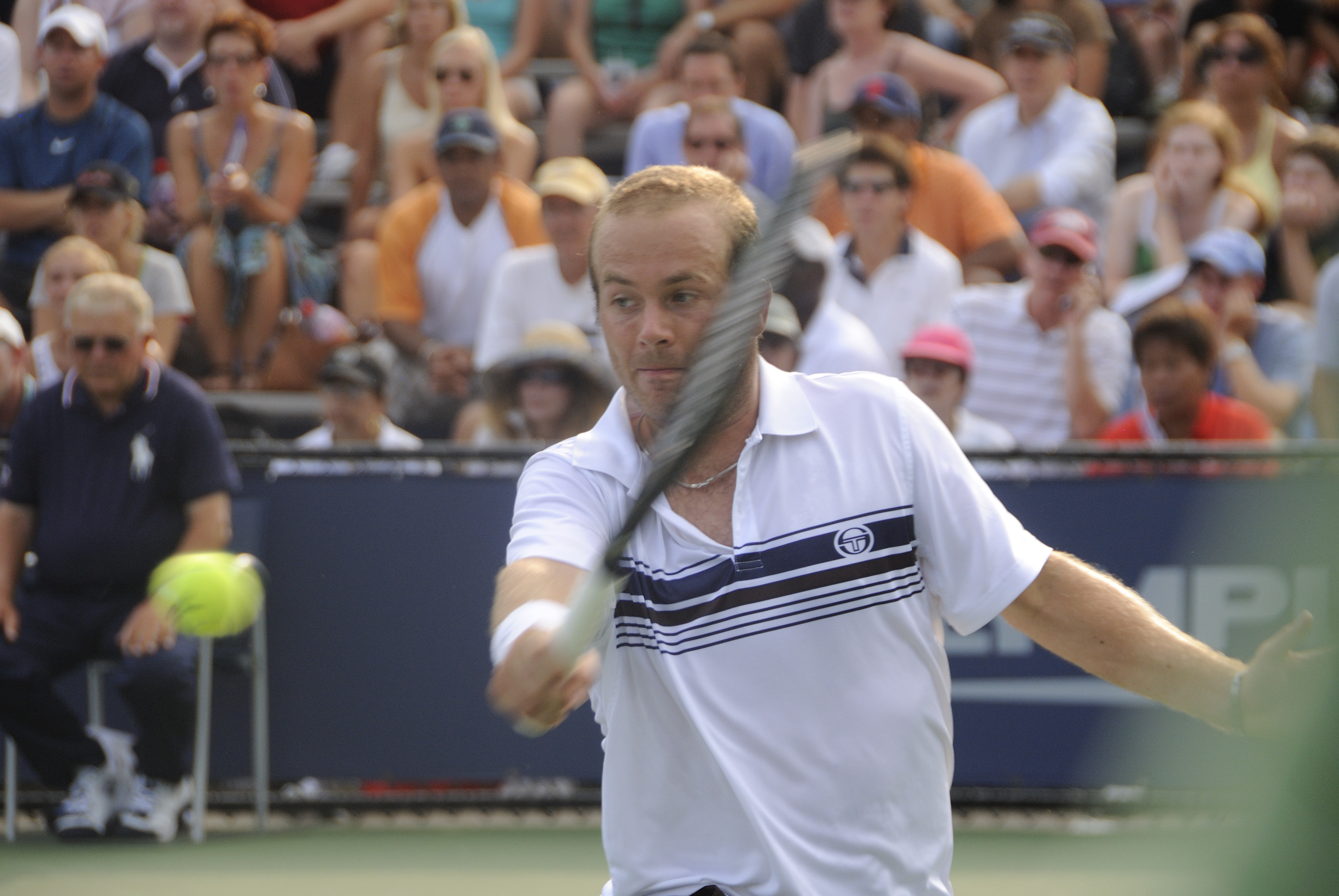
Olivier Rochus

Player	W-L (Total)	W-L (Singles)	W-L (Doubles)	Ties	Debut
Ruben Bemelmans	11–13	4–8	7–5	17	2008
Bernard Boileau	22–16	16–10	6–6	14	1977
Willard Botsford	3–3	2–2	1–1	2	1927
Alain Brichant	6–7	1–4	5–3	8	1981
Jacques Brichant	71–49	52–27	19–22	42	1949
Kimmer Coppejans	2–2	1–2	1–0	2	2015
Steve Darcis	21–15	20–8	1–7	20	2005
Xavier Daufresne	6–7	3–4	3–3	8	1988
Léopold de Borman	14–11	0–6	14–5	19	1930
Paul de Borman	1–11	1–8	0–3	5	1904
Arthur De Greef	0–1	0–1	0–0	1	2017
Claude De Gronckel	0–10	0–6	0–4	7	1960
Joris De Loore	3–0	1–0	2–0	2	2016
Johan De Muynck	0–1	0–0	0–1	1	1977
Johan de Preter	0–2	0–2	0–0	1	1987
Karel Demuynck	2–5	2–3	0–2	4	1985
Niels Desein	1–0	0–0	1–0	1	2015
Filip Dewulf	16–26	12–16	4–10	21	1991
Eric Drossart	15–34	8–25	7–9	18	1960
William du Vivier	0–2	0–0	0–2	2	1913
Gilles Elseneer	5–2	4–1	1–1	4	2002
Andre Ewbank	3–8	2–5	1–3	4	1928
Georges François	0–1	0–0	0–1	1	1926
Jean-Pierre Froment	1–6	1–5	0–1	4	1958
Pierre Geelhand de Merxem	8–10	3–6	5–4	15	1936
David Goffin	15–6	15–3	0–3	11	2012
Kris Goossens	0–2	0–2	0–0	1	1995
Jacques Grandjean	1–4	0–3	1–1	3	1982
Patrick Hombergen	26–31	15–24	11–7	21	1966
Maurice Iwiens-D'eeckhoutte	0–4	0–4	0–0	2	1928
Andre Jamar	0–2	0–2	0–0	1	1958
André Lacroix	35–25	21–19	14–6	25	1928
André Laloux	0–2	0–2	0–0	1	1926
Albert Lammens	2–3	1–2	1–1	2	1919
Denis Langaskens	9–6	6–2	3–4	7	1987
William le Maire de Warzee	2–4	2–2	0–2	2	1904
Xavier Malisse	12–12	12–8	0–4	15	1998
Eduardo Masso	6–8	6–4	0–4	6	1990
Gino Mezzi	2–5	1–3	1–2	3	1956
Bernard Mignot	15–11	9–9	6–2	9	1972
Charles Naeyaert	9–10	9–10	0–0	10	1934
Dick Norman	5–5	3–3	2–2	6	1995
Jacques Peten	4–9	4–8	0–1	7	1946
Libor Pimek	2–5	0–0	2–5	7	1991
Jean-Pierre Richer	0–2	0–2	0–0	1	1977
Christophe Rochus	6–15	4–11	2–4	14	1999
Olivier Rochus	23–28	15–15	8–13	30	2000
Thierry Stevaux	6–10	4–6	2–4	8	1977
Jacques van den Eynde	3–7	3–6	0–1	6	1936
Jean-Claude van der Borght	0–3	0–2	0–1	2	1961
Christophe Van Garsse	6–5	6–4	0–1	7	1994
Johan Van Herck	7–5	7–3	0–2	9	1995
Jan Vanlangendonck	11–12	9–8	2–4	10	1983
Guy van Zuylen	0–3	0–3	0–0	2	1932
Tom Vanhoudt	4–5	0–0	4–5	9	1991
Kristof Vliegen	11–11	6–6	5–5	13	2003
Jean Washer	14–10	11–5	3–5	8	1921
Philippe Washer	66–36	46–18	20–18	39	1946
Georges Watson	1–15	0–10	1–5	6	1913
Stefan Wauters	0–1	0–1	0–0	1	2006
Bart Wuyts	15–7	15–6	0–1	11	1988
