= 1986 Donnay Indoor Championships =

- Date: 13–23 March
- Edition: 6th
- Draw: 32S / 16D
- Prize money: $250,000
- Surface: Carpet / indoor
- Location: Brussels, Belgium
- Venue: Forest National

Champions

Singles
- (Sweden) Mats Wilander

Doubles
- (West Germany) Boris Becker / (Socialist Federal Republic of Yugoslavia) Slobodan Živojinović
- Donnay Indoor Championships

The 1986 Donnay Indoor Championships was a men's tennis tournament played on indoor carpet courts at the Forest National in Brussels, Belgium the event was part of the 1986 Nabisco Grand Prix. It was the sixth edition of the tournament and was held from 13 March until 23 March 1986. First-seeded Mats Wilander won the singles title.

== Finals ==
=== Singles ===
(Sweden) Mats Wilander defeated (Australia) Broderick Dyke, 6–2, 6–3

- It was Wilander's 1st singles title of the year and the 20th of his career.

=== Doubles ===
(West Germany) Boris Becker / (Socialist Federal Republic of Yugoslavia) Slobodan Živojinović defeated (Australia) John Fitzgerald / (Czechoslovakia) Tomáš Šmíd, 7–6, 7–5
