= Damir Keretić =

German tennis player

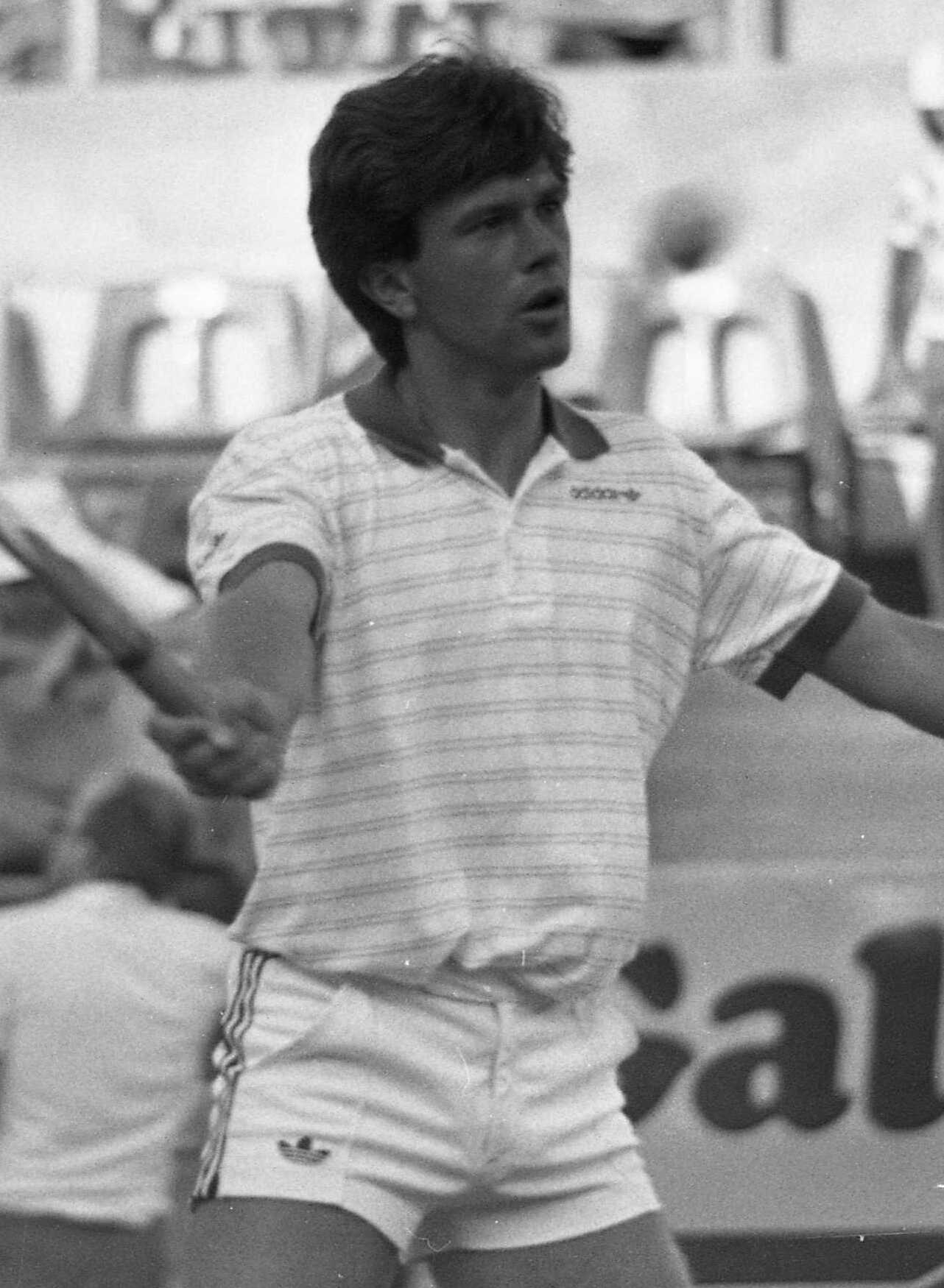
- Damir Keretić at the 1983 Davis Cup
- Country (sports): Germany
- Residence: Hamburg, Germany
- Born: 26 March 1960 (age 66) Zagreb, FPR Yugoslavia
- Height: 1.78 m (5 ft 10 in)
- Plays: Right-handed
- Prize money: $338,421

Singles
- Career record: 91–123
- Career titles: 0
- Highest ranking: No. 58 (7 February 1983)

Grand Slam singles results
- Australian Open: 4R (1982)
- French Open: 4R (1986)
- Wimbledon: 3R (1983, 1985, 1986, 1987)

Doubles
- Career record: 20–65
- Career titles: 0
- Highest ranking: No. 155 (23 September 1985)

Grand Slam doubles results
- Australian Open: 1R (1982, 1985, 1988, 1989)
- French Open: 1R (1982, 1983)

Damir Keretić (born 26 March 1960) is a ex-professional tennis player who represented West Germany in Davis Cup in the 1980s.

== Biography ==
The only title he won during his career was the Challenger tournament in Naples, Italy in 1981. By getting to the round of 16 at the Australian Open in December 1982 the right-hander reached a high singles ATP-ranking on 7 February 1983, when he became number 58 in the world. In 1986 he also reached the round of 16 at the French Open.

He made his Davis Cup debut for West Germany in 1983 during the Europe Zone quarterfinals against Belgium. All his Davis Cup matches were during 1983 and he won 4 of the 6 singles matches that he played.

In 2020 Keretić, as part of the consortium DAFC Fussball GMBH began proceedings to buy a controlling stake in the Scottish football club Dunfermline Athletic.

== Challenger titles ==
=== Singles: (1) ===
No.	Date	Tournament	Surface	Opponent	Score
1.	Jun 1981	Napoli Challenger, Italy	Clay	(Argentina) Gustavo Guerrero	4–6, 6–2, 6–2
