= 1990 Belgian Indoor Championships =

- Date: 12–18 February
- Edition: 9th
- Category: Championship Series
- Draw: 32S / 16D
- Prize money: $465,000
- Surface: Carpet / indoor
- Location: Brussels, Belgium
- Venue: Forest National

Champions

Singles
- (West Germany) Boris Becker

Doubles
- (Spain) Emilio Sánchez / (Socialist Federal Republic of Yugoslavia) Slobodan Živojinović
- Belgian Indoor Championships

The 1990 Belgian Indoor Championships was a tennis tournament played on indoor carpet courts. It was the 9th edition of the event known that year as the Belgian Indoor Championships, and was part of the ATP Championship Series, double-week events of the 1990 ATP Tour, running concurrently with the 1990 SkyDome World Tennis Tournament. It took place at the Forest National in Brussels, Belgium, from 12 February until 18 February 1990. First-seeded Boris Becker won the singles title.

== Finals ==
=== Singles ===
(West Germany) Boris Becker defeated (West Germany) Carl-Uwe Steeb, 7–5, 6–2, 6–2

- It was Becker's first singles title of the year, and the 25th of his career.

=== Doubles ===
(Spain) Emilio Sánchez / (Socialist Federal Republic of Yugoslavia) Slobodan Živojinović defeated (Socialist Federal Republic of Yugoslavia) Goran Ivanišević / (Hungary) Balázs Taróczy, 7–5, 6–3

- It was Sánchez's first doubles title of the year, and the 27th of his career.
- It was Živojinović's first doubles title of the year, and the eighth of his career.
