= 1990 Belgian Indoor Championships – Singles =

Singles
- 1990 Belgian Indoor Championships

Final
- Champion: (West Germany) Boris Becker
- Runner-up: (West Germany) Carl-Uwe Steeb
- Score: 7–5, 6–2, 6–2

Details
- Draw: 32
- Seeds: 8

Events
Singles	Doubles
← 1989 ·	Belgian Indoor Championships	· 1991 →

Henri Leconte was the champion of the event when it last took place, in 1988. He participated in 1990 but lost in the first round.
Boris Becker won the title, defeating Carl-Uwe Steeb 7–5, 6–2, 6–2, in the final.

== Seeds ==
1. (West Germany) Boris Becker (champion)
2. (West Germany) Carl-Uwe Steeb (final)
3. (Spain) Emilio Sánchez (first round)
4. (Switzerland) Jakob Hlasek (second round)
5. (Haiti) Ronald Agénor (quarterfinals)
6. (Sweden) Magnus Gustafsson (semifinals)
7. (Italy) Paolo Canè (quarterfinals, retired)
8. (Socialist Federal Republic of Yugoslavia) Goran Ivanišević (quarterfinals)

== Draw ==
=== Key ===
- Q = Qualifier
- WC = Wild card
- LL = Lucky loser
- Alt = Alternate
- SE = Special exempt
- PR = Protected ranking
- ITF = ITF entry
- JE = Junior exempt
- w/o = Walkover
- r = Retired
- d = Defaulted
- SR = Special ranking

=== Finals ===
Semifinals
1	(West Germany) Boris Becker	6	7
6	(Sweden) Magnus Gustafsson	4	6
(Czechoslovakia) Miloslav Mečíř	2	3
2	(West Germany) Carl-Uwe Steeb	6	6

Final
1	(West Germany) Boris Becker	7	6	6
2	(West Germany) Carl-Uwe Steeb	5	2	2

=== Top half ===
First round
1	(West Germany) B Becker	7^{7}	6
(Czechoslovakia) K Nováček	6^{4}	2
Q	(France) A Boetsch	3	4
(France) G Forget	6	6
(Spain) J Aguilera	6	6^{4}	6
(Czechoslovakia) M Střelba	2	7^{7}	3
(Italy) O Camporese	3	3
7	(Italy) P Canè	6	6
4	(Switzerland) J Hlasek	6	6
(Netherlands) M Koevermans	4	1
(Soviet Union) A Volkov	4	6^{3}
(Sweden) J Svensson	6	7^{7}
Q	(United States) T Nelson	3	6	4
(Israel) A Mansdorf	6	3	6
(Sweden) J Gunnarsson	2	2
6	(Sweden) M Gustafsson	6	6

Second round
1	(West Germany) B Becker	3	6	7^{7}
(France) G Forget	6	3	6^{4}
(Spain) J Aguilera	3	7^{7}	4
7	(Italy) P Canè	6	6^{0}	6
4	(Switzerland) J Hlasek	7	2	6^{9}
(Sweden) J Svensson	5	6	7^{11}
(Israel) A Mansdorf	4	4
6	(Sweden) M Gustafsson	6	6

Quarterfinals
1	(West Germany) B Becker	6	3
(Italy) P Canè	4	2^{r}
(Sweden) J Svensson	7^{7}	6^{3}	3
6	(Sweden) M Gustafsson	6^{3}	7^{7}	6

Semifinals
1	(West Germany) B Becker	6	7^{7}
6	(Sweden) M Gustafsson	4	6^{4}

=== Bottom half ===
First round
5	(Haiti) R Agénor	6	6
(Netherlands) M Schapers	4	4
WC	(Belgium) X Daufresne	6	2	1
WC	(Belgium) B Wuyts	4	6	6
(Soviet Union) A Cherkasov	6	6^{1}	2
Q	(Finland) A Rahunen	4	7^{7}	6
(Czechoslovakia) M Mečíř	6	3	6
3	(Spain) E Sánchez	4	6	4
8	(Socialist Federal Republic of Yugoslavia) G Ivanišević	6	2	6
(West Germany) J Wöhrmann	4	6	3
(Socialist Federal Republic of Yugoslavia) G Prpić	6	5	6
WC	(France) H Leconte	3	7	1
Q	(Sweden) T Högstedt	6	6
(Switzerland) M Rosset	4	2
(West Germany) E Jelen	3	6^{2}
2	(West Germany) C-U Steeb	6	7^{7}

Second round
5	(Haiti) R Agénor	6	6
WC	(Belgium) B Wuyts	4	4
Q	(Finland) A Rahunen	6^{3}	4
(Czechoslovakia) M Mečíř	7^{7}	6
8	(Socialist Federal Republic of Yugoslavia) G Ivanišević	6	6^{2}	6
(Socialist Federal Republic of Yugoslavia) G Prpić	3	7^{7}	2
Q	(Sweden) T Högstedt	6^{1}	6	2
2	(West Germany) C-U Steeb	7^{7}	4	6

Quarterfinals
5	(Haiti) R Agénor	3	2
(Czechoslovakia) M Mečíř	6	6
8	(Socialist Federal Republic of Yugoslavia) G Ivanišević	3	6	4
2	(West Germany) C-U Steeb	6	3	6

Semifinals
(Czechoslovakia) M Mečíř	2	3
2	(West Germany) C-U Steeb	6	6
