= 1986 Donnay Indoor Championships – Singles =

Singles
- 1986 Donnay Indoor Championships

Final
- Champion: (Sweden) Mats Wilander
- Runner-up: (Australia) Broderick Dyke
- Score: 6–2, 6–3

Details
- Draw: 32
- Seeds: 8

Events
| Singles | Doubles |
- Donnay Indoor Championships

Anders Järryd was the defending champion, but lost in the quarterfinals this year.

Mats Wilander won the title, defeating Broderick Dyke 6–2, 6–3 in the final.

== Seeds ==
1. (Sweden) Mats Wilander (champion)
2. (West Germany) Boris Becker (first round)
3. (Sweden) Joakim Nyström (semifinals)
4. (Sweden) Anders Järryd (quarterfinals)
5. (Czechoslovakia) Miloslav Mečíř (semifinals)
6. (United States) Kevin Curren (quarterfinals)
7. (France) Henri Leconte (first round)
8. (Sweden) Henrik Sundström (first round)

== Draw ==
Key

- Q = Qualifier
- WC = Wild card
- LL = Lucky loser
- Alt = Alternate
- ITF = ITF entry
- PR = Protected ranking
- SR = Special ranking
- SE = Special exempt
- JE = Junior exempt
- JR = Junior Accelerator Programme entrant
- CO = College Accelerator Programme entrant
- NG = Next Gen Accelerator Program entrant
- w/o = Walkover
- r = Retired
- d = Defaulted

=== Finals ===
Semifinals
1 | (Sweden) Mats Wilander | 2 | 6 | 6
3 | (Sweden) Joakim Nyström | 6 | 4 | 2
5 | (Czechoslovakia) Miloslav Mečíř | 2 | 3
SE | (Australia) Broderick Dyke | 6 | 6

Final
1 | (Sweden) Mats Wilander | 6 | 6
SE | (Australia) Broderick Dyke | 2 | 3

=== Top half ===
First round
1 | (Sweden) M Wilander | 6 | 6
Q | (Sweden) J Svensson | 4 | 4
(Socialist Federal Republic of Yugoslavia) S Živojinović | 6 | 2 | 6
(Switzerland) H Günthardt | 2 | 6 | 3
(United States) M Dickson | 3 | 6 | 4
WC | (Belgium) K Demuynck | 6 | 4 | 6
(United States) J Canter | 6 | 6
7 | (France) H Leconte | 4 | 4
3 | (Sweden) J Nyström | 6 | 6
(Sweden) P Lundgren | 1 | 2
(Spain) S Casal | 6 | 2
Q | (United Kingdom) J Bates | 7 | 6
(Sweden) J Gunnarsson | 1 | 6
(Czechoslovakia) T Šmíd | 6 | 7
Q | (United States) C Hooper | 6 | 7 | 6
6 | (United States) K Curren | 7 | 6 | 7

Second round
1 | (Sweden) M Wilander | 7 | 6
(Socialist Federal Republic of Yugoslavia) S Živojinović | 6 | 4
WC | (Belgium) K Demuynck | 5 | 1
(United States) J Canter | 7 | 6
3 | (Sweden) J Nyström | 6 | 3 | 7
Q | (United Kingdom) J Bates | 1 | 6 | 5
(Czechoslovakia) T Šmíd | 6 | 3
6 | (United States) K Curren | 7 | 6

Quarterfinals
1 | (Sweden) M Wilander | 4 | 6 | 6
(United States) J Canter | 6 | 3 | 2
3 | (Sweden) J Nyström | 6 | 6
6 | (United States) K Curren | 1 | 4

Semifinals
1 | (Sweden) M Wilander | 2 | 6 | 6
3 | (Sweden) J Nyström | 6 | 4 | 2

=== Bottom half ===
First round
5 | (Czechoslovakia) M Mečíř | 6 | 6
SE | (Netherlands) M Schapers | 4 | 2
(Spain) E Sánchez | 6 | 6
(Haiti) R Agénor | 4 | 4
WC | (United States) V Gerulaitis | 3 | 1
(Czechoslovakia) M Vajda | 6 | 6
(United States) B Teacher | 1 | 2
4 | (Sweden) A Järryd | 6 | 6
8/WC | (Sweden) H Sundström | 1 | 0
(France) G Forget | 6 | 6
Q | (Sweden) T Högstedt | 1 | 6 | 3
(Switzerland) J Hlasek | 6 | 1 | 6
(Czechoslovakia) L Pimek | 6 | 7
(Poland) W Fibak | 4 | 5
SE | (Australia) B Dyke | 6 | 6
2 | (West Germany) B Becker | 1 | 3

Second round
5 | (Czechoslovakia) M Mečíř | 6 | 6
(Spain) E Sánchez | 3 | 2
(Czechoslovakia) M Vajda | 6 | 0 | 3
4 | (Sweden) A Järryd | 3 | 6 | 6
(France) G Forget | 6 | 6
(Switzerland) J Hlasek | 3 | 4
(Czechoslovakia) L Pimek | 6 | 5 | 3
SE | (Australia) B Dyke | 3 | 7 | 6

Quarterfinals
5 | (Czechoslovakia) M Mečíř | 6 | 6
4 | (Sweden) A Järryd | 4 | 3
(France) G Forget | 1 | 6 | 6
SE | (Australia) B Dyke | 6 | 2 | 7

Semifinals
5 | (Czechoslovakia) M Mečíř | 2 | 3
SE | (Australia) B Dyke | 6 | 6
