= Denis Langaskens =

Belgian tennis player

- Full name: Denis Langaskens
- Country (sports): Belgium
- Born: 20 September 1966 (age 58); Ostend, Belgium
- Turned pro: 1985
- Retired: 1990

Singles
- Career record: 0–0
- Highest ranking: No. 334 (7 November 1988)

Doubles
- Career record: 0–6
- Career titles: 0
- Highest ranking: No. 157 (28 August 1989)

Denis Langaskens (born 20 September 1966) is a former professional tennis player from Belgium.

== Biography ==
Langaskens was born in Ostend and based during his career in Liège. As a junior, he had a win over Patrick McEnroe at the 1984 French Open and he also competed in the boys' singles at the Wimbledon Championships, before turning professional in 1985.

As a professional player, he mostly competed on the Challenger circuit, but made occasional appearances at Grand Prix level, all in doubles competition. In 1988, he played two Grand Prix tournaments, the Brussels Indoor and Dutch Open. In 1989, he made the main draw of the Geneva Open, before featuring again at Brussels in 1990. He won a total of three Challenger doubles titles, in Budapest, Knokke and Odrimont.

He first represented the Belgium Davis Cup team in a 1987 tie against Switzerland in Lugano, in which he played the doubles rubber. The following year, he played in losing ties to Finland and Hungary, resulting in Belgium's relegation from Europe Zone Group 1. In 1989, he featured in a further three ties and was unbeaten in all of his matches that year, six singles and three doubles rubbers, to help Belgium return to Group 1. His seventh and final appearance was in Belgium's win over Hungary in 1990, which qualified them for the World Group play-offs.

Retiring from the tour in 1990, Langaskens later played club tennis in Duisburg, Germany.

== Challenger titles ==
=== Doubles: (3) ===
No.	Year	Tournament	Surface	Partner	Opponents	Score
1.	1988	Budapest, Hungary	Clay	(Belgium) Eduardo Masso	(Denmark) Peter Bastiansen (Denmark) Peter Flintsø	6–4, 7–5
2.	1989	Knokke, Belgium	Clay	(Belgium) Xavier Daufresne	(Belgium) Karel Demuynck (Belgium) Libor Pimek	7–5, 6–2
3.	1989	Odrimont, Belgium	Clay	(Belgium) Xavier Daufresne	(Sweden) Per Henricsson (India) Srinivasan Vasudevan	6–4, 6–2

== See also ==
- List of Belgium Davis Cup team representatives
