= Philip Tuckniss =

Zimbabwean tennis player (born 1962)

- Born: May 5, 1962 (age 62); Zimbabwe
- Occupation: Contractor/restorer

James Philip Tuckniss (born May 5, 1962) is a retired tennis player from Zimbabwe, who competed in the men's doubles at the 1988 Summer Olympics in Seoul.

== Early life and education ==
Born in Harare, Zimbabwe to parents who later moved to South Africa, Tuckniss moved to the United States, attending graduate school at the University of Tennessee at Chattanooga. While at Tennessee, he won three singles and there doubles titles in the Southern Conference, and was inducted into the UTC Hall of Fame in 1992.

== Career ==
A tennis player, Tuckniss was ranked #456 in men's singles in July 1986, his career best, and was #828 in the world in doubles in July 1987. He was a member of Zimbabwe's Davis Cup team from 1983 to 1988.

Tuckniss represented his native country as a qualifier for the men's doubles at the 1988 Summer Olympics in Seoul, South Korea. Partnering with Mark Gurr, he lost in the second round of the men's doubles competition to Sweden's eventual bronze medalists Anders Järryd and Stefan Edberg.
