= Johan de Preter =

Belgian tennis player

- Country (sports): Belgium
- Born: 19 April 1962 (age 63)
- Plays: Right-handed

Singles
- Career record: 0–2 (Davis Cup)
- Highest ranking: No. 453 (13 Oct 1986)

Doubles
- Highest ranking: No. 526 (13 Oct 1986)

Johan de Preter (born 19 April 1962) is a Belgian former professional tennis player.

Active in the 1980s, de Preter is a native of Mechelen and played two years of collegiate tennis for the University of Louisiana. His professional career included an occasional ATP Challenger main draw appearance and he reached a best singles world ranking of 453. He appeared for the Belgium Davis Cup team in a 1987 tie against Switzerland in Lugano, then in 1991 and 1992 served as the team's non-playing captain.

== See also ==
- List of Belgium Davis Cup team representatives
