= Russell Barlow =

Australian tennis player

- Full name: Russell Barlow
- Country (sports): Australia
- Born: 18 December 1962 (age 63) Toowoomba, Queensland
- Plays: Left-handed
- Prize money: $61,805

Singles
- Career record: 3–9
- Career titles: 0
- Highest ranking: No. 175 (9 October 1989)

Grand Slam singles results
- Australian Open: 1R (1988)

Doubles
- Career record: 10–42
- Career titles: 0
- Highest ranking: No. 118 (6 April 1987)

Grand Slam doubles results
- Australian Open: 2R (1985)
- French Open: 1R (1987)
- Wimbledon: 1R (1987)

Russell Barlow (born 18 December 1962) is a former professional tennis player from Australia.

== Biography ==
Barlow, a left-handed player from Toowoomba, twice finished runner-up at the Australian Junior Championships, in the Under-14s and Under-16s age groups. He made the quarter-finals of the boys' event at the 1980 Australian Open.

During the 1980s, Barlow competed professionally on the international circuit. He had Grand Prix wins over Kim Warwick at the GWA Mazda Tennis Classic in Brisbane in 1983, Wojciech Fibak in the 1985 Grand Prix de Tennis de Toulouse and Magnus Gustafsson, seventh seed at the 1988 Donnay Indoor Championships in Brussels. At the 1988 Australian Open he qualified for the main draw of a Grand Slam for the only time and lost in the first round to West German Carl-Uwe Steeb.

As a doubles player his best result came when he made the semi-finals with Carl Limberger at Bordeaux in 1985. He played doubles at the Australian Open, French Open and Wimbledon Championships. In 1987, his only appearance at Wimbledon, he and partner Harald Rittersbacher were drawn against top seeds Guy Forget and Yannick Noah in the opening round.

In 1989 he won two Challenger titles, the first at Croydon, in the doubles event with Swede Ville Jansson. He then claimed the singles title at Singapore, over Neil Borwick in the final, just weeks after he finished runner-up to the same player in Kuala Lumpur.

A member of the ATP board in the 1990s, Barlow also worked as an ATP executive in Montreal. He is now involved in coaching.

== Challenger titles ==
=== Singles: (1) ===
No.	Year	Tournament	Surface	Opponent	Score
1.	1989	Singapore	Hard	(Australia) Neil Borwick	7–6, 4–6, 6–3

=== Doubles: (1) ===
No.	Year	Tournament	Surface	Partner	Opponents	Score
1.	1989	Croydon, Great Britain	Carpet	(Sweden) Ville Jansson	(United States) Mike De Palmer (South Africa) Byron Talbot	2–6, 6–3, 7–5
