= Jacques Grandjean =

Belgian tennis player

- Country (sports): Belgium
- Born: 1 February 1954 (age 71)

Singles
- Career record: 0–5 (ATP Tour & Davis Cup)
- Highest ranking: No. 289 (3 Jan 1983)

Doubles
- Career record: 1–1 (Davis Cup)
- Highest ranking: No. 480 (3 Jan 1983)

Jacques Grandjean (born 1 February 1954) is a Belgian former professional tennis player.

Grandjean was a Davis Cup representative for Belgium and debuted in a 1982 tie against Israel in Eupen, losing his singles rubber in five sets to Shahar Perkiss. In 1983 he featured in further ties against Poland and West Germany. He reached a best singles world ranking of 289 and took a set off Johan Kriek (world no. 16) at the 1983 Brussels Indoor, one of his two Grand Prix circuit main draw appearances. He won a national championship in doubles in 1985.

== See also ==
- List of Belgium Davis Cup team representatives
