= Gunter Vanderveeren =

Belgian tennis player

- Country (sports): Belgium
- Born: 5 April 1970 (age 55)
- Prize money: $14,635

Singles
- Career record: 0–1
- Highest ranking: No. 358 (10 Oct 1994)

Grand Slam singles results
- Wimbledon: Q1 (1995)

Doubles
- Career record: 0–3
- Highest ranking: No. 261 (14 Nov 1994)

Gunter Vanderveeren (born 5 April 1970) is a Belgian former professional tennis player.

Vanderveeren, who reached a best singles world ranking of 358, featured in the main draw of the 1988 Brussels Indoor and in qualifying for the 1995 Wimbledon Championships.

From 2007 to 2009 he coached Belgian player Kristof Vliegen.
