= 1988 Donnay Indoor Championships =

- Date: 21–27 November
- Edition: 8th
- Draw: 32S / 16D
- Prize money: $372,500
- Surface: Carpet / indoor
- Location: Brussels, Belgium
- Venue: Forest National

Champions

Singles
- (France) Henri Leconte

Doubles
- (Australia) Wally Masur / (Netherlands) Tom Nijssen
- Donnay Indoor Championships

The 1988 Donnay Indoor Championships was a men's tennis tournament played on indoor carpet courts at the Forest National in Brussels, Belgium the event was part of the 1988 Nabisco Grand Prix. It was the eighth edition of the tournament and was held from 21 November until 27 November 1988. First-seeded Henri Leconte won the singles title.

== Finals ==
=== Singles ===
(France) Henri Leconte defeated (Switzerland) Jakob Hlasek, 7–6^{(7–3)}, 7–6^{(8–6)}, 6–4

- It was Leconte's 2nd singles title of the year and the 8th of his career.

=== Doubles ===
(Australia) Wally Masur / (Netherlands) Tom Nijssen defeated (Australia) John Fitzgerald / (Czechoslovakia) Tomáš Šmíd, 7–5, 7–6
