= Alain Brichant =

Belgian tennis player

- Full name: Alain Brichant
- Country (sports): Belgium
- Born: 7 May 1959 (age 65)
- Died: 13 May 2024; Brussels

Singles
- Career record: 0–2
- Highest ranking: No. 329 (6 August 1984)

Doubles
- Career record: 3–10
- Highest ranking: No. 184 (26 August 1985)

Grand Slam doubles results
- French Open: 1R (1981, 1982)

Alain Brichant (born 7 May 1959) is a former professional tennis player from Belgium.

== Biography ==
From 1981 to 1986, Brichant competed for the Belgium Davis Cup team in a total of eight ties and was the second member of his family to represent Belgium in tennis. His father Jacky, a French Open semi-finalist, played in a record 42 Davis Cup ties. Alain possède 8 titres de champion de Belgique, 1 en simple Messieurs (indoor), 4 en double Messieurs et 3 en double mixte.

Most of Brichant's appearances on the Grand Prix circuit came as a doubles player. His best performance on tour was a semi-final appearance at the Brussels Outdoor in 1980, with Bernard Boileau as his partner. He won two Challenger doubles titles.

He featured in the main draw of the men's doubles at both the 1981 French Open and 1982 French Open.

== Challenger titles ==
=== Doubles: (2) ===
No.	Year	Tournament	Surface	Partner	Opponents	Score
1.	1981	Brussels, Belgium	Clay	(Belgium) Bernard Boileau	(South Africa) Mike Myburg (South Africa) Frank Punčec	7–5, 6–2
2.	1985	Ostend, Belgium	Clay	(Belgium) Jan Vanlangendonck	(Italy) Massimo Cierro (Brazil) Ivan Kley	6–2, 6–2

== See also ==
- List of Belgium Davis Cup team representatives
