= Karel Demuynck =

Belgian tennis player

- Country (sports): Belgium
- Born: 21 March 1965 (age 60)
- Prize money: $21,413

Singles
- Career record: 2–6
- Highest ranking: No. 321 (13 Oct 1986)

Doubles
- Highest ranking: No. 405 (15 Sep 1986)

Karel Demuynck (born 21 March 1965) is a Belgian former professional tennis player.

A Limburg native, Demuynck featured in four Davis Cup ties for Belgium. On his debut in 1985 he won a reverse singles which gave Belgium the tie against Bulgaria. His only other win came in his final appearance in 1988 when he defeated Hungary's Ferenc Csepai in a relegation playoff which Belgium ultimately lost.

Demuynck competed in the main draw of the Brussels Indoor on five occasions during the 1980s and twice made the second round, with wins over Mark Dickson in 1986 and Xavier Daufresne in 1988.

== See also ==
- List of Belgium Davis Cup team representatives
