= Jan Vanlangendonck =

Belgian tennis player (born 1960)

- Country (sports): Belgium
- Born: 10 January 1960 (age 65) Heist-op-den-Berg, Belgium
- Plays: Right-handed

Singles
- Career record: 0–7
- Highest ranking: No. 191 (4 February 1985)

Doubles
- Career record: 2–15
- Highest ranking: No. 166 (26 November 1984)

Grand Slam doubles results
- French Open: 1R (1982)

Jan Vanlangendonck (born 10 January 1960) is a Belgian former professional tennis player.

Born in Heist-op-den-Berg, Vanlangendonck was a right-handed player and played on the professional tour in the 1980s. He reached a best singles ranking of 191 in the world and featured in the men's doubles main draw of the 1982 French Open.

Vanlangendonck appeared in 10 Davis Cup ties for Belgium between 1983 and 1987.

His daughter, Eliessa Vanlangendonck, plays on the WTA Tour.

== Challenger titles ==
=== Doubles: (1) ===
| Year | Tournament | Surface | Partner | Opponents | Score |
|---|---|---|---|---|---|
| 1985 | Ostend, Belgium | Clay | (Belgium) Alain Brichant | (Italy) Massimo Cierro (Brazil) Ivan Kley | 6–2, 6–2 |

== See also ==
- List of Belgium Davis Cup team representatives
