= Broderick Dyke =

Australian tennis player

- Country (sports): Australia
- Born: 31 December 1960 (age 65) Gumeracha, Australia
- Height: 183 cm (6 ft 0 in)
- Plays: Left-handed (2-handed backhand)
- Prize money: $827,093

Singles
- Career record: 78–122
- Career titles: 0
- Highest ranking: No. 35 (24 March 1986)

Grand Slam singles results
- Australian Open: 3R (1985)
- French Open: 1R (1986, 1988)
- Wimbledon: 2R (1983)
- US Open: 2R (1986, 1987)

Doubles
- Career record: 244–235
- Career titles: 8
- Highest ranking: No. 23 (26 March 1984)

Grand Slam doubles results
- Australian Open: QF (1983, 1984, 1987)
- French Open: SF (1983)
- Wimbledon: 3R (1984, 1985, 1988)
- US Open: 2R (1983, 1984)

Broderick Dyke (born 31 December 1960) is a former professional tennis player from Australia.

Dyke enjoyed most of his tennis success while playing doubles. During his career he won 8 doubles titles and finished runner-up an additional 14 times. He achieved a career-high doubles ranking of world No. 23 in March 1984. In singles he was twice a runner-up, including at the Brussels Indoor where he defeated Boris Becker and Miloslav Mečíř en route to the final.

== Career finals ==
=== Doubles (8 titles, 14 runner-ups) ===
Result	W/L	Date	Tournament	Surface	Partner	Opponents	Score
Loss	0–1	Dec 1982	Adelaide, Australia	Grass	(Australia) Wayne Hampson	(Australia) Pat Cash (Australia) Chris Johnstone	3–6, 7–6, 6–7
Loss	0–2	Jan 1983	Melbourne, Australia	Grass	(Australia) Wayne Hampson	(South Africa) Eddie Edwards (United Kingdom) Jonathan Smith	6–7, 3–6
Loss	0–3	Dec 1983	Sydney, Australia	Grass	(Australia) Rod Frawley	(United States) Mike Bauer (Australia) Pat Cash	6–7, 4–6
Loss	0–4	Dec 1983	Adelaide, Australia	Grass	(Australia) Rod Frawley	(Australia) Craig Miller (United States) Eric Sherbeck	3–6, 6–4, 4–6
Loss	0–5	Jul 1984	Hilversum, Netherlands	Clay	(Australia) Michael Fancutt	(Sweden) Anders Järryd (Czechoslovakia) Tomáš Šmíd	4–6, 7–5, 6–7
Loss	0–6	Oct 1984	Brisbane, Australia	Carpet	(Australia) Wally Masur	(Paraguay) Francisco González (United States) Matt Mitchell	7–6, 2–6, 5–7
Win	1–6	Oct 1984	Melbourne, Australia	Carpet	(Australia) Wally Masur	(Australia) John McCurdy (Australia) Peter Johnston	6–2, 6–3
Win	2–6	Dec 1984	Adelaide, Australia	Grass	(Australia) Wally Masur	(Australia) Peter Doohan (South Africa) Brian Levine	4–6, 7–5, 6–1
Win	3–6	Dec 1984	Melbourne, Australia	Grass	(Australia) Wally Masur	(United States) Mike Bauer (United States) Scott McCain	7–6, 3–6, 7–6
Loss	3–7	Jan 1985	Auckland, New Zealand	Hard	(Australia) Wally Masur	(Australia) John Fitzgerald (New Zealand) Chris Lewis	6–7, 2–6
Loss	3–8	Mar 1985	Milan, Italy	Carpet	(Australia) Wally Masur	(Switzerland) Heinz Günthardt (Sweden) Anders Järryd	2–6, 1–6
Loss	3–9	Oct 1985	Sydney, Australia	Grass	(Australia) Wally Masur	(United States) David Dowlen (Nigeria) Nduka Odizor	4–6, 6–7
Win	4–9	Jan 1986	Auckland, New Zealand	Hard	(Australia) Wally Masur	(United States) Karl Richter (United States) Rick Rudeen	6–3, 6–4
Loss	4–10	May 1986	Munich, West Germany	Clay	(Australia) Wally Masur	(Spain) Sergio Casal (Spain) Emilio Sánchez	3–6, 6–4, 4–6
Loss	4–11	Oct 1987	Brisbane, Australia	Hard (i)	(Australia) Wally Masur	(United States) Matt Anger (New Zealand) Kelly Evernden	6–7, 2–6
Win	5–11	Oct 1987	Tokyo, Japan	Carpet	(Netherlands) Tom Nijssen	(United States) Sammy Giammalva, Jr. (United States) Jim Grabb	6–3, 6–2
Loss	5–12	Jan 1988	Wellington, New Zealand	Hard	(Canada) Glenn Michibata	(United States) Dan Goldie (United States) Rick Leach	2–6, 3–6
Win	6–12	Feb 1988	Lyon, France	Carpet	(Australia) Brad Drewett	(Denmark) Michael Mortensen (United States) Blaine Willenborg	3–6, 6–3, 6–4
Win	7–12	Jul 1989	Schenectady, U.S.	Hard	(United States) Scott Davis	(United States) Brad Pearce (South Africa) Byron Talbot	2–6, 6–4, 6–4
Loss	7–13	Oct 1989	Brisbane, Australia	Hard	(Australia) Simon Youl	(Australia) Darren Cahill (Australia) Mark Kratzmann	4–6, 7–5, 0–6
Loss	7–14	Jul 1990	Toronto, Canada	Hard	(Sweden) Peter Lundgren	(United States) Paul Annacone (United States) David Wheaton	1–6, 6–7
Win	8–14	Oct 1990	Sydney, Australia	Hard (i)	(Sweden) Peter Lundgren	(Sweden) Stefan Edberg (Czechoslovakia) Ivan Lendl	6–2, 6–4

=== Singles (2 runner-ups) ===
Result	W/L	Date	Tournament	Surface	Opponent	Score
Loss	0–1	Mar 1986	Metz, France	Carpet (i)	(France) Thierry Tulasne	4–6, 3–6
Loss	0–2	Mar 1986	Brussels, Belgium	Carpet (i)	(Sweden) Mats Wilander	6–7, 3–6
