= Donnay Indoor Championships =

Defunct tennis tournament
- Event name: Brussels Indoor
- Tour: ATP Tour (1990–92); Grand Prix circuit (1980–88)
- Founded: 1981
- Abolished: 1992
- Editions: 11
- Location: Brussels, Belgium
- Venue: Forest National
- Surface: Carpet (i)

The Brussels Indoor (also known as the Donnay Indoor Championships) is a defunct professional tennis tournament played on indoor carpet courts at Forest National in Brussels. It was part of the Grand Prix tennis circuit initially and later, for three years, the ATP Championship Series of the ATP Tour. The tournament was established in 1980, becoming the second tournament to be played in Brussels, along with the ATP Brussels Outdoor. The following year the outdoor tournament was played for the last time, leaving the Donnay Indoor Championships as the sole professional tournament in the region.

It was held between 1981 and 1988 and then again from 1990 until 1992.

== Past finals ==
=== Singles ===
Year	Champions	Runners-up	Score
1981	(United States) Jimmy Connors	(United States) Brian Gottfried	6–2, 6–4, 6–3
1982	(United States) Vitas Gerulaitis	(Sweden) Mats Wilander	4–6, 7–6, 6–2
1983	(Australia) Peter McNamara	(Czechoslovakia) Ivan Lendl	6–4, 4–6, 7–6
1984	(United States) John McEnroe	(Czechoslovakia) Ivan Lendl	6–1, 6–3
1985	(Sweden) Anders Järryd	(Sweden) Mats Wilander	6–4, 3–6, 7–5
1986	(Sweden) Mats Wilander	(Australia) Broderick Dyke	6–2, 6–3
1987	(Sweden) Mats Wilander	(United States) John McEnroe	6–3, 6–4
1988	(France) Henri Leconte	(Switzerland) Jakob Hlasek	7–6, 7–6, 6–4
1989	Not held		
1990	(Germany) Boris Becker	(Germany) Carl-Uwe Steeb	7–5, 6–2, 6–2
1991	(France) Guy Forget	(Soviet Union) Andrei Cherkasov	6–3, 7–5, 3–6, 7–6
1992	(Germany) Boris Becker	(United States) Jim Courier	6–7^{(5–7)}, 2–6, 7–6^{(12–10)}, 7–6^{(7–5)}, 7–5

=== Doubles ===
Year	Champions	Runners-up	Score
1981	(United States) Sandy Mayer (South Africa) Frew McMillan	(South Africa) Kevin Curren (United States) Steve Denton	4–6, 6–3, 6–3
1982	(Czechoslovakia) Pavel Složil (United States) Sherwood Stewart	(United States) Tracy Delatte (United States) Chris Dunk	6–4, 6–7, 7–5
1983	(Switzerland) Heinz Günthardt (Hungary) Balázs Taróczy	(Sweden) Hans Simonsson (Sweden) Mats Wilander	6–2, 6–4
1984	(United States) Tim Gullikson (United States) Tom Gullikson	(South Africa) Kevin Curren (United States) Steve Denton	6–4, 6–7, 7–6
1985	(Sweden) Stefan Edberg (Sweden) Anders Järryd	(South Africa) Kevin Curren (Poland) Wojciech Fibak	6–3, 7–6
1986	(West Germany) Boris Becker (Socialist Federal Republic of Yugoslavia) Slobodan Živojinović	(Australia) John Fitzgerald (Czechoslovakia) Tomáš Šmíd	7–6, 7–5
1987	(West Germany) Boris Becker (Socialist Federal Republic of Yugoslavia) Slobodan Živojinović	(United States) Chip Hooper (United States) Mike Leach	7–6, 7–6
1988	(Australia) Wally Masur (Netherlands) Tom Nijssen	(Australia) John Fitzgerald (Czechoslovakia) Tomáš Šmíd	W/O
1989	Not held		
1990	(Spain) Emilio Sánchez (Socialist Federal Republic of Yugoslavia) Slobodan Živojinović	(Socialist Federal Republic of Yugoslavia) Goran Ivanišević (Hungary) Balázs Taróczy	7–5, 6–3
1991	(Australia) Todd Woodbridge (Australia) Mark Woodforde	(Belgium) Libor Pimek (Netherlands) Michiel Schapers	6–3, 6–0
1992	(Germany) Boris Becker (United States) John McEnroe	(France) Guy Forget (Switzerland) Jakob Hlasek	6–3, 6–2

== See also ==
- List of tennis tournaments
