= List of ATP number 1 ranked singles tennis players =

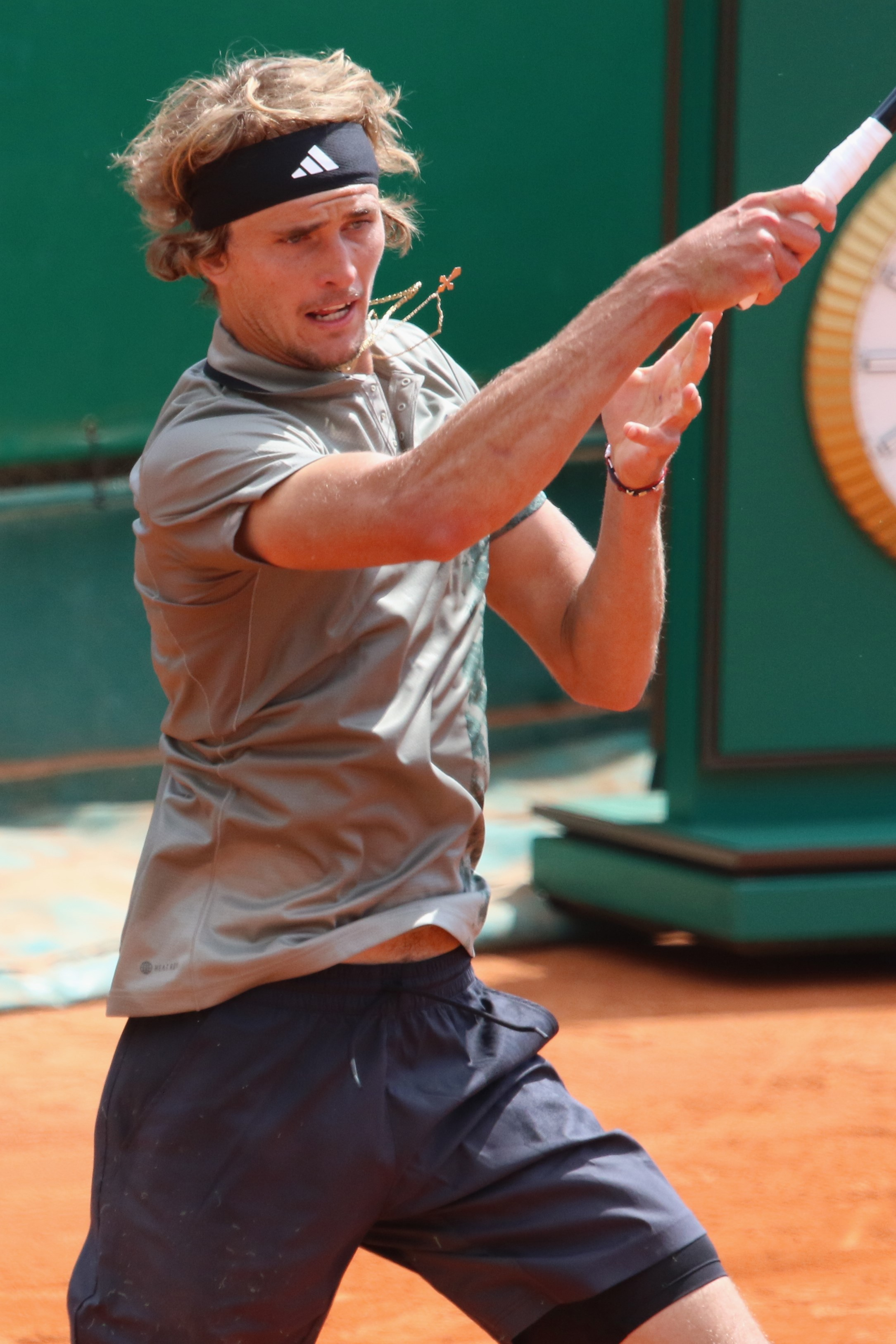
Alexander Zverev, the current men's singles world No. 1 and year-end No. 1 for 2026

The PIF ATP rankings are the Association of Tennis Professionals' (ATP) merit-based system for determining the rankings in men's tennis. The top-ranked player is the player who, over the previous 52 weeks, has garnered the most ranking points on the ATP Tour. Points are awarded based on how far a player advances in tournaments and the category of those tournaments. The ATP has used a computerized system for determining the rankings since August 23, 1973. Starting in 1979, an updated rankings list is released at the beginning of each week. Since 1973, 30 players, have been ranked No. 1 by the ATP, of which 20 have been year-end No. 1.

== Ranking method ==
Since the introduction of the rankings, the method used to calculate a player's ranking points has changed several times. As of 2019, the rankings are calculated by totaling the points a player wins in his best eighteen tournaments, subject to certain restrictions. For top players the counting tournaments are the four Grand Slam tournaments, the eight mandatory ATP Masters tournaments, the non-mandatory ATP Masters 1000 event in Monte-Carlo, the player's best four eligible ATP Tour 500 tournaments and his best two results from ATP Tour 250 tournaments. Lower-ranked players who are not eligible for some or all of the top tournaments may include additional ATP 500 and ATP 250 events, and also ATP Challenger Tour and ITF Men's Circuit tournaments. Players who qualify for the year-end ATP Finals also include any points gained from the tournament in their total, increasing the number of tournaments counted to 19.

=== ATP singles ranking ===
1973–1982; ATP ranking's average system as introduced on August 23, 1973.

1983–1989; ATP ranking's average system with bonus points for beating top ranked players.

1990–1999; ‘Best of 14’ ranking system, where a player’s best 14 results in the events counted.

2000–2008; ‘Best of 18’ ranking system, where a player’s best 18 results in the events counted.

2009–2019; A new point scale for ATP rankings to the ‘Best of 18’ ranking system.

2020 (Note: The ATP rankings were frozen from March 23 to August 23, 2020, due to the COVID-19 pandemic.)–2021; ‘Best of 24-month’ ranking system from August 23, 2020 to August 9, 2021 for the two pandemic-impacted seasons.

2022–2023; Normal ATP’s ranking system over a 52-week period restored since August 2021.

2024–present; An updated ATP Rankings breakdown with increase in points at tour-level events since January 2024.

== ATP records and distinctions ==
Novak Djokovic has spent the most weeks as world No. 1, a record total 428 weeks. Roger Federer has a record 237 consecutive weeks at No. 1. Djokovic also holds the record for the most year-end No. 1 finishes, achieving the feat for eight years (including the two pandemic-impacted seasons). Pete Sampras held the year-end No. 1 ranking for a record six consecutive years.

Carlos Alcaraz is both the youngest world No. 1 (19 years, 4 months and 7 days), and the youngest year-end No. 1 (19 years, 7 months and 21 days). Djokovic is both the oldest world No. 1 (37 years and 18 days) and the oldest year-end No. 1 (36 years, 7 months and 9 days).

Federer is the player with the longest time span (14 years, 142 days) between his first and most recent dates at No. 1 (February 2, 2004 – June 24, 2018), while Rafael Nadal is the only player to hold the top ranking in three different decades, spanning 11 years, 168 days (August 18, 2008 — February 2, 2020), 46 weeks in the 2000s, 159 weeks in the 2010s, and 4 weeks in the 2020s. Djokovic has the longest time span (12 years) between his first and last year-end No. 1 finish (2011–2023), and is the only player to be ranked No. 1 at least once in a year for 13 different years (2011–2016 & 2018–2024).

Federer holds the record of wire-to-wire No. 1 for three consecutive calendar years. Since 1973 when the ATP rankings started, there have been 13 years in which one player held the top spot for the entire year: Jimmy Connors in 1975, 1976, and 1978; Lendl in 1986 and 1987; Pete Sampras in 1994 and 1997; Hewitt in 2002; Federer in 2005, 2006, and 2007; and Djokovic in 2015 and 2021. In contrast, 1999 saw five players hold the No. 1 ranking (the most in any single year): Sampras, Carlos Moyá, Yevgeny Kafelnikov, Andre Agassi, and Patrick Rafter. The 1999 season is also the only season with 3 players making their No. 1 debut, with only 4 other seasons seeing 2 players making their No. 1 debuts, 1974, 2000, 2003, and 2022.

Prior to 2009, Federer accumulated the most year-end ATP ranking points in any season, with 8,370 points in 2006. Since the introduction of a new point scale for the ATP rankings from 2009, Djokovic achieved the same feat with 16,585 ranking points in 2015 season. Djokovic holds the distinction of having 16,950 ranking points on June 6, 2016, the most ATP points ever accumulated by any player since 2009.

John McEnroe held the No. 1 ranking a record 14 times, Sampras and Djokovic are the only two other players to have held it 10 or more times, with 11 and 10 stints respectively. Rafter spent the least time at number 1 (one week).

Two players, Ivan Lendl and Marcelo Ríos, have reached No. 1 without previously having won a major singles title. Lendl reached No. 1 on February 21, 1983, but did not win his first Grand Slam title until the 1984 French Open. Ríos reached No. 1 on March 30, 1998, but retired without ever having won a Grand Slam title, making him the only No. 1 player with that distinction.

== ATP No. 1 ranked singles players ==
The statistics are updated only when the ATP website revises its rankings (usually on Monday mornings except when tournament finals are postponed).

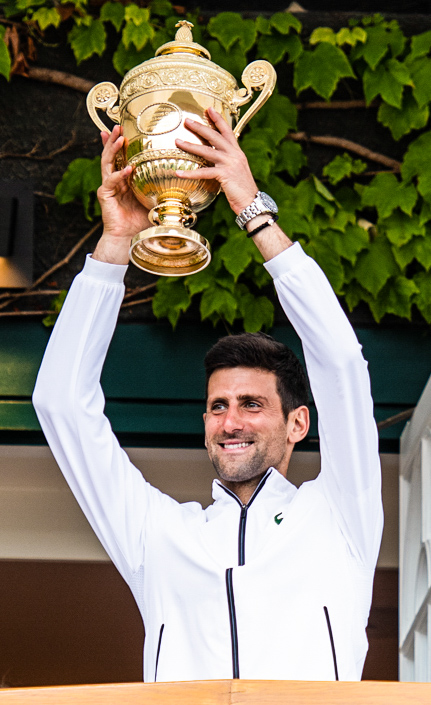
Novak Djokovic, the record holder for most weeks spent as world No. 1 and spent the most weeks at the top of the ATP rankings in the 2010s.

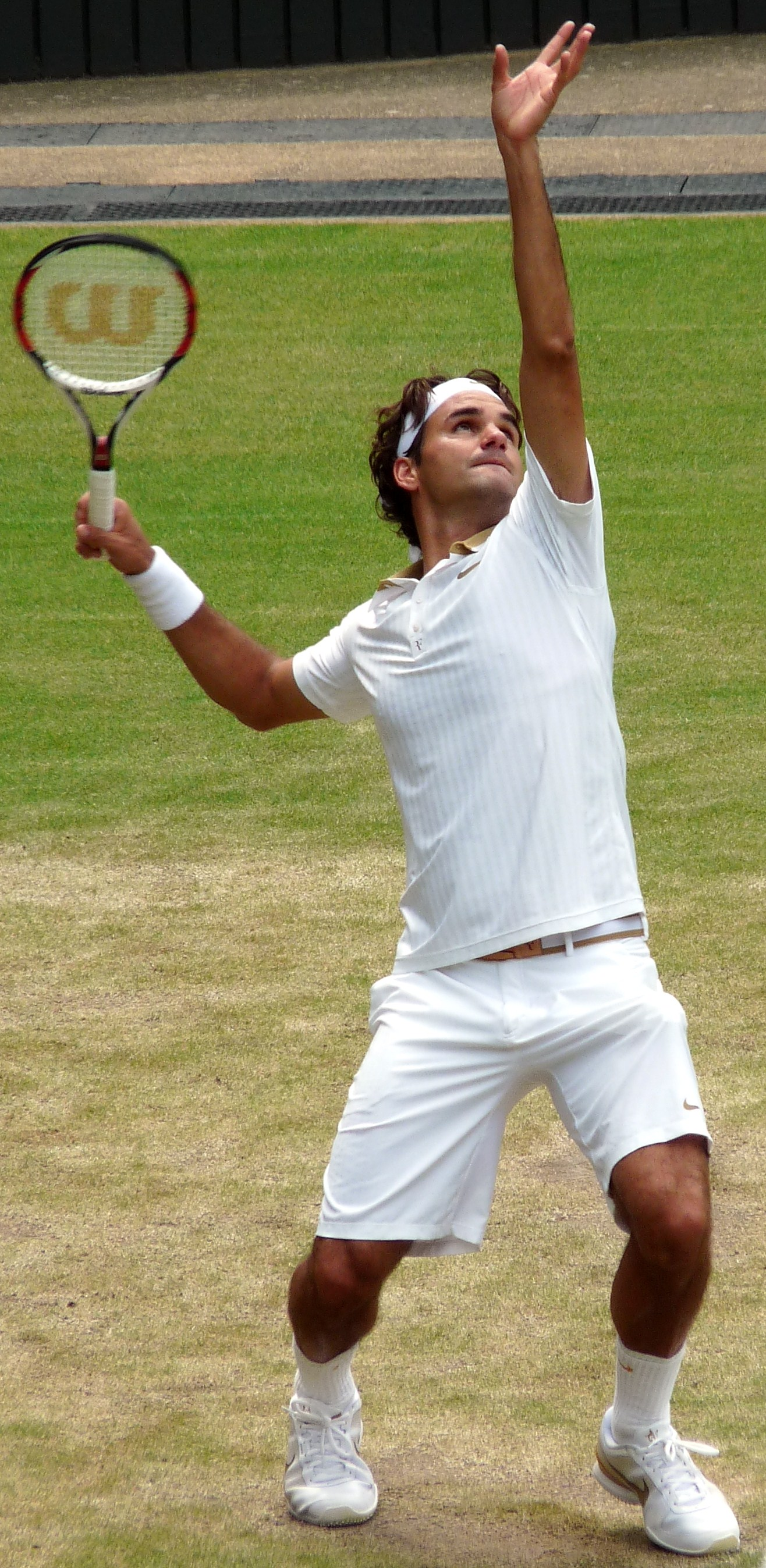
Roger Federer spent the most weeks at the top of the ATP rankings in the 2000s.

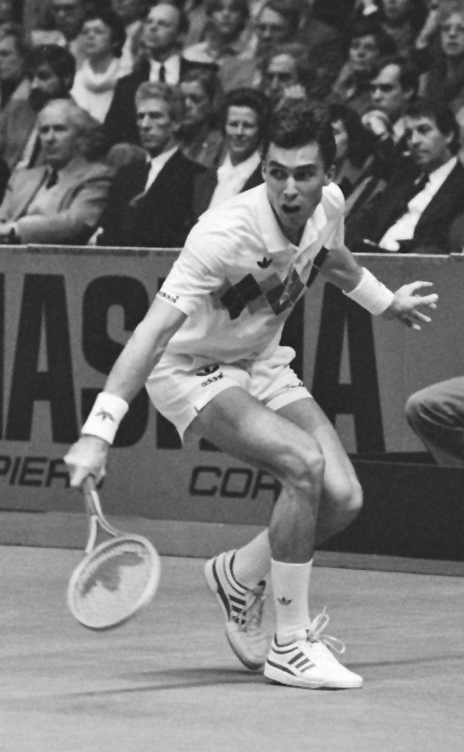
Ivan Lendl spent the most weeks at the top of the ATP rankings in the 1980s.

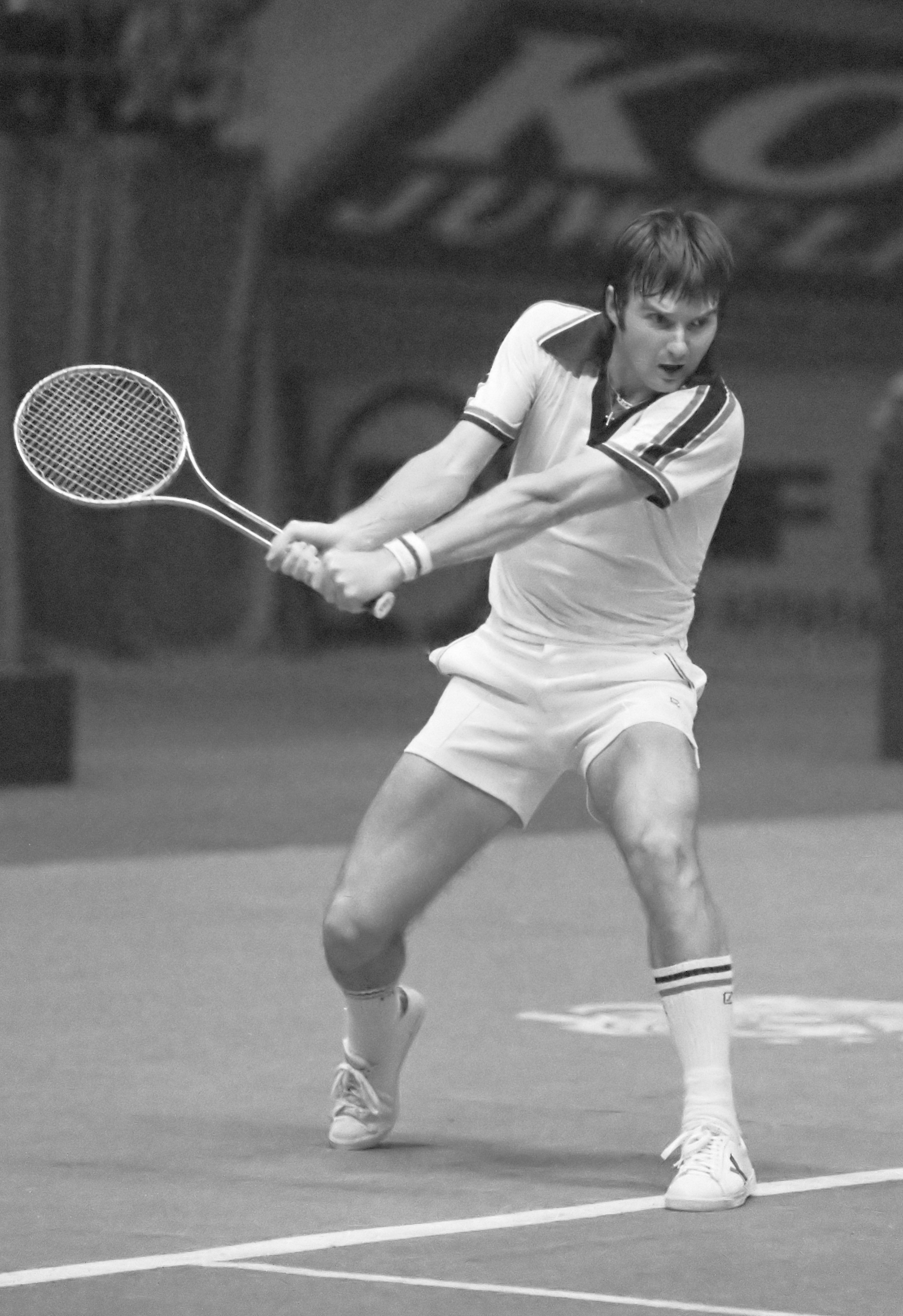
Jimmy Connors spent the most weeks at world No. 1 in the 1970s.

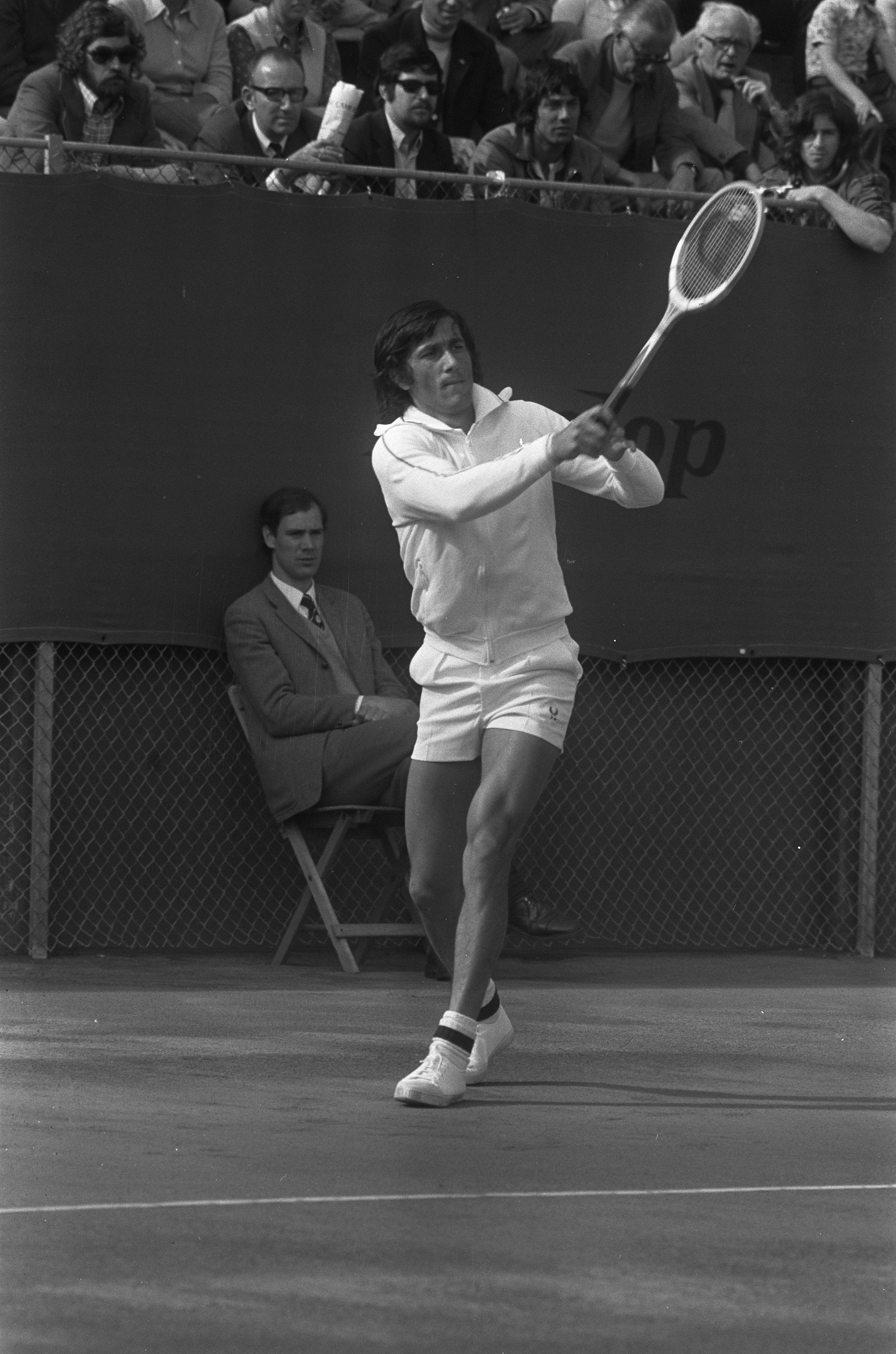
Ilie Năstase became the first ATP world No. 1 ranked player on August 23, 1973.

First-time No. 1 player.
Current world No. 1 (weeks are automatically updated).
‡ ATP rankings record.

No.	Player	Start date	End date	Weeks	Total
1	Ilie Năstase (ROU)	Aug 23, 1973	Jun 2, 1974	40	40
2	John Newcombe (AUS)	Jun 3, 1974	Jul 28, 1974	8	8
3	Jimmy Connors (USA)	Jul 29, 1974	Aug 22, 1977	160	160
4	Björn Borg (SWE)	Aug 23, 1977	Aug 29, 1977	1	1
	(United States) Jimmy Connors (2)	Aug 30, 1977	Apr 8, 1979	84	244
	(Sweden) Björn Borg (2)	Apr 9, 1979	May 20, 1979	6	7
	(United States) Jimmy Connors (3)	May 21, 1979	Jul 8, 1979	7	251
	(Sweden) Björn Borg (3)	Jul 9, 1979	Mar 2, 1980	34	41
5	John McEnroe (USA)	Mar 3, 1980	Mar 23, 1980	3	3
	(Sweden) Björn Borg (4)	Mar 24, 1980	Aug 10, 1980	20	61
	(United States) John McEnroe (2)	Aug 11, 1980	Aug 17, 1980	1	4
	(Sweden) Björn Borg (5)	Aug 18, 1980	Jul 5, 1981	46	107
	(United States) John McEnroe (3)	Jul 6, 1981	Jul 19, 1981	2	6
	(Sweden) Björn Borg (6)	Jul 20, 1981	Aug 2, 1981	2	109
	(United States) John McEnroe (4)	Aug 3, 1981	Sep 12, 1982	58	64
	(United States) Jimmy Connors (4)	Sep 13, 1982	Oct 31, 1982	7	258
	(United States) John McEnroe (5)	Nov 1, 1982	Nov 7, 1982	1	65
	(United States) Jimmy Connors (5)	Nov 8, 1982	Nov 14, 1982	1	259
	(United States) John McEnroe (6)	Nov 15, 1982	Jan 30, 1983	11	76
	(United States) Jimmy Connors (6)	Jan 31, 1983	Feb 6, 1983	1	260
	(United States) John McEnroe (7)	Feb 7, 1983	Feb 13, 1983	1	77
	(United States) Jimmy Connors (7)	Feb 14, 1983	Feb 27, 1983	2	262
6	Ivan Lendl (TCH)	Feb 28, 1983	May 15, 1983	11	11
	(United States) Jimmy Connors (8)	May 16, 1983	Jun 5, 1983	3	265
	(United States) John McEnroe (8)	Jun 6, 1983	Jun 12, 1983	1	78
	(United States) Jimmy Connors (9)	Jun 13, 1983	Jul 3, 1983	3	268
	(United States) John McEnroe (9)	Jul 4, 1983	Oct 30, 1983	17	95
	(Czechoslovakia) Ivan Lendl (2)	Oct 31, 1983	Dec 11, 1983	6	17
	(United States) John McEnroe (10)	Dec 12, 1983	Jan 8, 1984	4	99
	(Czechoslovakia) Ivan Lendl (3)	Jan 9, 1984	Mar 11, 1984	9	26
	(United States) John McEnroe (11)	Mar 12, 1984	Jun 10, 1984	13	112
	(Czechoslovakia) Ivan Lendl (4)	Jun 11, 1984	Jun 17, 1984	1	27
	(United States) John McEnroe (12)	Jun 18, 1984	Jul 8, 1984	3	115
	(Czechoslovakia) Ivan Lendl (5)	Jul 9, 1984	Aug 12, 1984	5	32
	(United States) John McEnroe (13)	Aug 13, 1984	Aug 18, 1985	53	168
	(Czechoslovakia) Ivan Lendl (6)	Aug 19, 1985	Aug 25, 1985	1	33
	(United States) John McEnroe (14)	Aug 26, 1985	Sep 8, 1985	2	170
	(Czechoslovakia) Ivan Lendl (7)	Sep 9, 1985	Sep 11, 1988	157	190
7	Mats Wilander (SWE)	Sep 12, 1988	Jan 29, 1989	20	20
	(Czechoslovakia) Ivan Lendl (8)	Jan 30, 1989	Aug 12, 1990	80	270
8	Stefan Edberg (SWE)	Aug 13, 1990	Jan 27, 1991	24	24
9	Boris Becker (GER)	Jan 28, 1991	Feb 17, 1991	3	3
	(Sweden) Stefan Edberg (2)	Feb 18, 1991	Jul 7, 1991	20	44
	(Germany) Boris Becker (2)	Jul 8, 1991	Sep 8, 1991	9	12
	(Sweden) Stefan Edberg (3)	Sep 9, 1991	Feb 9, 1992	22	66
10	Jim Courier (USA)	Feb 10, 1992	Mar 22, 1992	6	6
	(Sweden) Stefan Edberg (4)	Mar 23, 1992	Apr 12, 1992	3	69
	(United States) Jim Courier (2)	Apr 13, 1992	Sep 13, 1992	22	28
	(Sweden) Stefan Edberg (5)	Sep 14, 1992	Oct 4, 1992	3	72
	(United States) Jim Courier (3)	Oct 5, 1992	Apr 11, 1993	27	55
11	Pete Sampras (USA)	Apr 12, 1993	Aug 22, 1993	19	19
	(United States) Jim Courier (4)	Aug 23, 1993	Sep 12, 1993	3	58
	(United States) Pete Sampras (2)	Sep 13, 1993	Apr 9, 1995	82	101
12	Andre Agassi (USA)	Apr 10, 1995	Nov 5, 1995	30	30
	(United States) Pete Sampras (3)	Nov 6, 1995	Jan 28, 1996	12	113
	(United States) Andre Agassi (2)	Jan 29, 1996	Feb 11, 1996	2	32
13	Thomas Muster (AUT)	Feb 12, 1996	Feb 18, 1996	1	1
	(United States) Pete Sampras (4)	Feb 19, 1996	Mar 10, 1996	3	116
	(Austria) Thomas Muster (2)	Mar 11, 1996	Apr 14, 1996	5	6
	(United States) Pete Sampras (5)	Apr 15, 1996	Mar 29, 1998	102	218
14	Marcelo Ríos (CHI)	Mar 30, 1998	Apr 26, 1998	4	4
	(United States) Pete Sampras (6)	Apr 27, 1998	Aug 9, 1998	15	233
	(Chile) Marcelo Ríos (2)	Aug 10, 1998	Aug 23, 1998	2	6
	(United States) Pete Sampras (7)	Aug 24, 1998	Mar 14, 1999	29	262
15	Carlos Moyá (ESP)	Mar 15, 1999	Mar 28, 1999	2	2
	(United States) Pete Sampras (8)	Mar 29, 1999	May 2, 1999	5	267
16	Yevgeny Kafelnikov (RUS)	May 3, 1999	Jun 13, 1999	6	6
	(United States) Pete Sampras (9)	Jun 14, 1999	Jul 4, 1999	3	270
	(United States) Andre Agassi (3)	Jul 5, 1999	Jul 25, 1999	3	35
17	Patrick Rafter (AUS)	Jul 26, 1999	Aug 1, 1999	1	1
	(United States) Pete Sampras (10)	Aug 2, 1999	Sep 12, 1999	6	276
	(United States) Andre Agassi (4)	Sep 13, 1999	Sep 10, 2000	52	87
	(United States) Pete Sampras (11)	Sep 11, 2000	Nov 19, 2000	10	286
18	Marat Safin (RUS)	Nov 20, 2000	Dec 3, 2000	2	2
19	Gustavo Kuerten (BRA)	Dec 4, 2000	Jan 28, 2001	8	8
	(Russia) Marat Safin (2)	Jan 29, 2001	Feb 25, 2001	4	6
	(Brazil) Gustavo Kuerten (2)	Feb 26, 2001	Apr 1, 2001	5	13
	(Russia) Marat Safin (3)	Apr 2, 2001	Apr 22, 2001	3	9
	(Brazil) Gustavo Kuerten (3)	Apr 23, 2001	Nov 18, 2001	30	43
20	Lleyton Hewitt (AUS)	Nov 19, 2001	Apr 27, 2003	75	75
	(United States) Andre Agassi (5)	Apr 28, 2003	May 11, 2003	2	89
	(Australia) Lleyton Hewitt (2)	May 12, 2003	Jun 15, 2003	5	80
	(United States) Andre Agassi (6)	Jun 16, 2003	Sep 7, 2003	12	101
21	Juan Carlos Ferrero (ESP)	Sep 8, 2003	Nov 2, 2003	8	8
22	Andy Roddick (USA)	Nov 3, 2003	Feb 1, 2004	13	13
23	Roger Federer (SUI)	Feb 2, 2004	Aug 17, 2008	237^{‡}	237
24	Rafael Nadal (ESP)	Aug 18, 2008	Jul 5, 2009	46	46
	(Switzerland) Roger Federer (2)	Jul 6, 2009	Jun 6, 2010	48	285
	(Spain) Rafael Nadal (2)	Jun 7, 2010	Jul 3, 2011	56	102
25	Novak Djokovic (SRB)	Jul 4, 2011	Jul 8, 2012	53	53
	(Switzerland) Roger Federer (3)	Jul 9, 2012	Nov 4, 2012	17	302
	(Serbia) Novak Djokovic (2)	Nov 5, 2012	Oct 6, 2013	48	101
	(Spain) Rafael Nadal (3)	Oct 7, 2013	Jul 6, 2014	39	141
	(Serbia) Novak Djokovic (3)	Jul 7, 2014	Nov 6, 2016	122	223
26	Andy Murray (GBR)	Nov 7, 2016	Aug 20, 2017	41	41
	(Spain) Rafael Nadal (4)	Aug 21, 2017	Feb 18, 2018	26	167
	(Switzerland) Roger Federer (4)	Feb 19, 2018	Apr 1, 2018	6	308
	(Spain) Rafael Nadal (5)	Apr 2, 2018	May 13, 2018	6	173
	(Switzerland) Roger Federer (5)	May 14, 2018	May 20, 2018	1	309
	(Spain) Rafael Nadal (6)	May 21, 2018	Jun 17, 2018	4	177
	(Switzerland) Roger Federer (6)	Jun 18, 2018	Jun 24, 2018	1	310
	(Spain) Rafael Nadal (7)	Jun 25, 2018	Nov 4, 2018	19	196
	(Serbia) Novak Djokovic (4)	Nov 5, 2018	Nov 3, 2019	52	275
	(Spain) Rafael Nadal (8)	Nov 4, 2019	Feb 2, 2020	13	209
	(Serbia) Novak Djokovic (5)	Feb 3, 2020	Mar 22, 2020	7	282
	Rankings frozen	Mar 23, 2020	Aug 23, 2020	22	
	(Serbia) Novak Djokovic (5)	Aug 24, 2020	Feb 27, 2022	79	361
27	Daniil Medvedev (RUS)	Feb 28, 2022	Mar 20, 2022	3	3
	(Serbia) Novak Djokovic (6)	Mar 21, 2022	Jun 12, 2022	12	373
	Daniil Medvedev (2)	Jun 13, 2022	Sep 11, 2022	13	16
28	Carlos Alcaraz (ESP)	Sep 12, 2022	Jan 29, 2023	20	20
	(Serbia) Novak Djokovic (7)	Jan 30, 2023	Mar 19, 2023	7	380
	(Spain) Carlos Alcaraz (2)	Mar 20, 2023	Apr 2, 2023	2	22
	(Serbia) Novak Djokovic (8)	Apr 3, 2023	May 21, 2023	7	387
	(Spain) Carlos Alcaraz (3)	May 22, 2023	Jun 11, 2023	3	25
	(Serbia) Novak Djokovic (9)	Jun 12, 2023	Jun 25, 2023	2	389
	(Spain) Carlos Alcaraz (4)	Jun 26, 2023	Sep 10, 2023	11	36
	(Serbia) Novak Djokovic (10)	Sep 11, 2023	Jun 9, 2024	39	428^{‡}
29	Jannik Sinner (ITA)	Jun 10, 2024	Sep 7, 2025	65	65
	(Spain) Carlos Alcaraz (5)	Sep 8, 2025	Nov 2, 2025	8	44
	(Italy) Jannik Sinner (2)	Nov 3, 2025	Nov 9, 2025	1	66
	(Spain) Carlos Alcaraz (6)	Nov 10, 2025	Apr 12, 2026	22	66
	(Italy) Jannik Sinner (3)	Apr 13, 2026	Nov 1, 2026	29	95
30	Alexander Zverev (GER)	Nov 2, 2026	present	3	3

== Weeks at No. 1 ==
Current No. 1 player (weeks are automatically updated).

Active players in bold.

=== Total ===
No.	Player	Total
1	(Serbia) **Novak Djokovic**	428
2	(Switzerland) Roger Federer	310
3	(United States) Pete Sampras	286
4	(Czechoslovakia) Ivan Lendl	270
5	(United States) Jimmy Connors	268
6	(Spain) Rafael Nadal	209
7	(United States) John McEnroe	170
8	(Sweden) Björn Borg	109
9	(United States) Andre Agassi	101
10	(Italy) **Jannik Sinner**	95
11	(Australia) Lleyton Hewitt	80
12	(Sweden) Stefan Edberg	72
13	(Spain) **Carlos Alcaraz**	66
14	(United States) Jim Courier	58
15	(Brazil) Gustavo Kuerten	43
16	(United Kingdom) Andy Murray	41
17	(Romania) Ilie Năstase	40
18	(Sweden) Mats Wilander	20
19	(Russia) **Daniil Medvedev**	16
20	(United States) Andy Roddick	13
21	(Germany) Boris Becker	12
22	(Russia) Marat Safin	9
23	(Australia) John Newcombe	8
23	(Spain) Juan Carlos Ferrero	8
25	(Austria) Thomas Muster	6
25	(Chile) Marcelo Ríos	6
25	(Russia) Yevgeny Kafelnikov	6
28	(Germany) **Alexander Zverev**	**3**
29	(Spain) Carlos Moyá	2
30	(Australia) Patrick Rafter	1

=== Consecutive ===
No.	Player	Weeks
1	(Switzerland) Roger Federer	237
2	(United States) Jimmy Connors	160
3	(Czechoslovakia) Ivan Lendl	157
4	(Serbia) Novak Djokovic	122
5	(United States) Pete Sampras	102
6	(Serbia) Novak Djokovic (2)	86
7	(United States) Jimmy Connors (2)	84
8	(United States) Pete Sampras (2)	82
9	(Czechoslovakia) Ivan Lendl (2)	80
10	(Australia) Lleyton Hewitt	75
11	(Italy) Jannik Sinner	65
12	(United States) John McEnroe	58
13	(Spain) Rafael Nadal	56
14	(United States) John McEnroe (2)	53
14	(Serbia) Novak Djokovic (3)	53
16	(United States) Andre Agassi	52
16	(Serbia) Novak Djokovic (4)	52
18	(Switzerland) Roger Federer (2)	48
18	(Serbia) Novak Djokovic (5)	48
20	(Sweden) Björn Borg	46
20	(Spain) Rafael Nadal (2)	46
	Current streak in **bold**.	

== Year-end No. 1 players ==
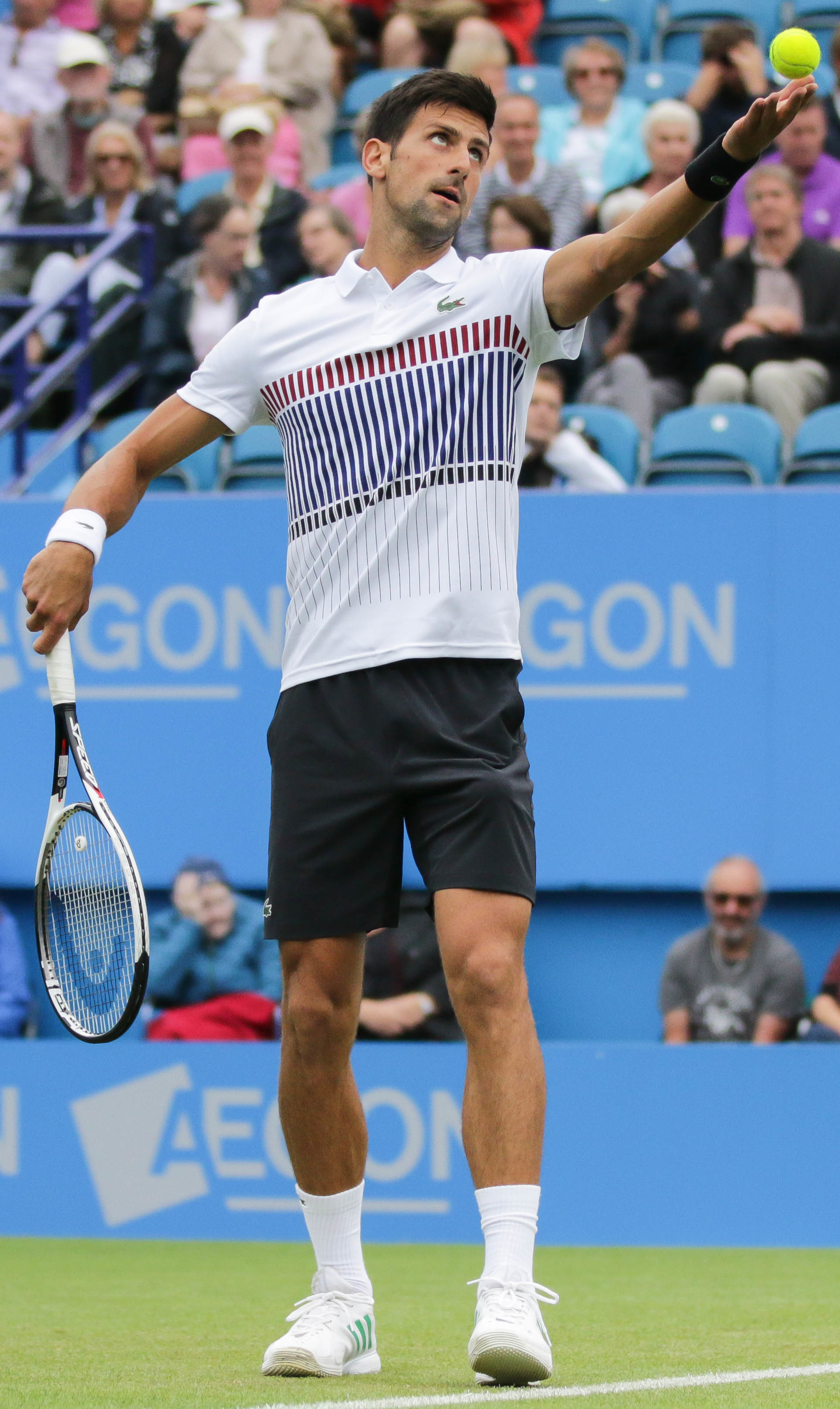
Novak Djokovic holds an all-time record of eight year-end No. 1 finishes.

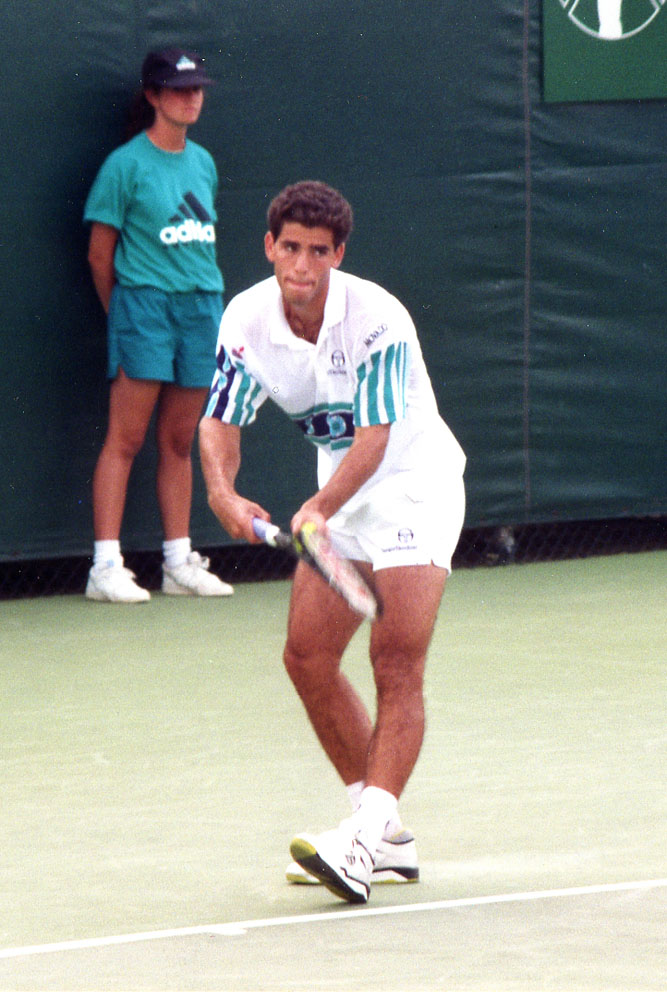
Pete Sampras finished six consecutive years as year-end No. 1 in the 1990s.

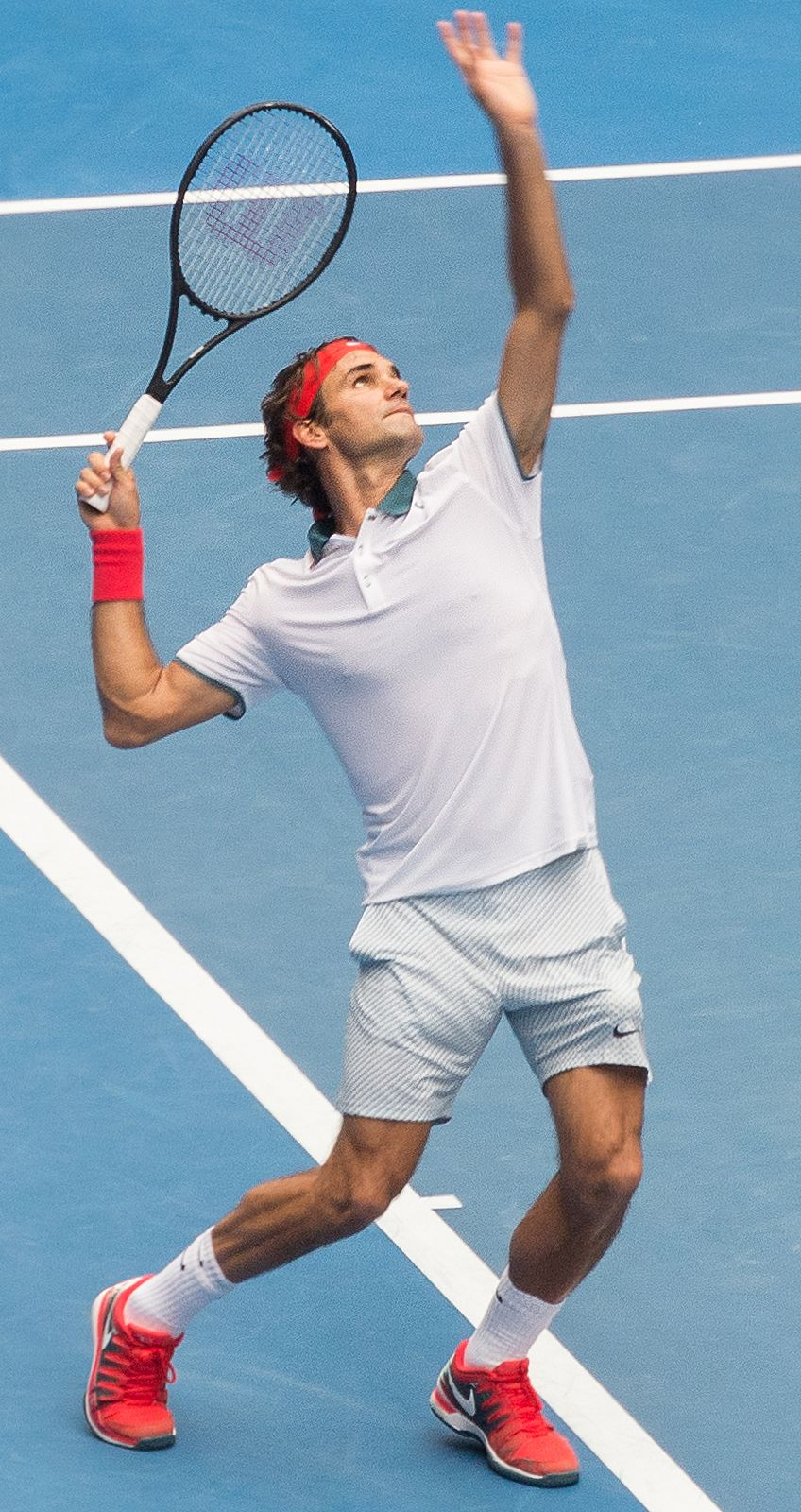
Roger Federer finished as the year-end No. 1 for four consecutive years and in total five years in the 2000s.

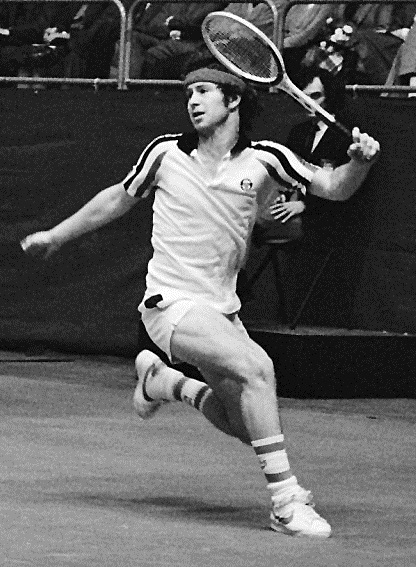
John McEnroe finished as the year-end No. 1 for four consecutive years in the 1980s.

In recent decades the ATP year-end No. 1 (ATP Player of the Year) has been determined as the player who ends the year as world No. 1 in the ATP rankings. Prior to the early 1990s this was not always the case: in some instances the "ATP Player of the Year" and the Year-end No. 1 in the rankings were different players (1975, 1976, 1977, 1978, 1982, 1989). Novak Djokovic holds the ATP record of eight year-end No. 1 finishes. Overall, 20 players have achieved the year-end No. 1 ranking. Ten of them have achieved this more than once, of which five (Lendl, Federer, Djokovic, Nadal and Alcaraz) have done so in non-consecutive years. Lendl and Federer were the first two players who would regain the Year-end No. 1. Nadal and Djokovic would regain the Year-end No. 1 four times. Six players have stayed at No. 1 in the ATP rankings for every week of the calendar year. Connors and Federer have done so in three years, Connors non-consecutively and Federer consecutively.

* Player was ranked No. 1 throughout the entire calendar year.

=== By year ===
Year	Player	Ref.
1973	Ilie Năstase (ROU)	
1974	Jimmy Connors (USA)	
1975^{*}	(United States) Jimmy Connors (2)	
1976^{*}	(United States) Jimmy Connors (3)	
1977	(United States) Jimmy Connors (4)	
1978^{*}	(United States) Jimmy Connors (5)	
1979	Björn Borg (SWE)	
1980	(Sweden) Björn Borg (2)	
1981	John McEnroe (USA)	
1982	(United States) John McEnroe (2)	
1983	(United States) John McEnroe (3)	
1984	(United States) John McEnroe (4)	
1985	Ivan Lendl (TCH)	
1986^{*}	(Czechoslovakia) Ivan Lendl (2)	
1987^{*}	(Czechoslovakia) Ivan Lendl (3)	
1988	Mats Wilander (SWE)	
1989	(Czechoslovakia) Ivan Lendl (4)	
1990	Stefan Edberg (SWE)	
1991	(Sweden) Stefan Edberg (2)	
1992	Jim Courier (USA)	
1993	Pete Sampras (USA)	
1994^{*}	(United States) Pete Sampras (2)	
1995	(United States) Pete Sampras (3)	
1996	(United States) Pete Sampras (4)	
1997^{*}	(United States) Pete Sampras (5)	
1998	(United States) Pete Sampras (6)	
1999	Andre Agassi (USA)	

=== By year (continued) ===
Year	Player	Ref
2000	Gustavo Kuerten (BRA)	
2001	Lleyton Hewitt (AUS)	
2002^{*}	(Australia) Lleyton Hewitt (2)	
2003	Andy Roddick (USA)	
2004	Roger Federer (SUI)	
2005^{*}	(Switzerland) Roger Federer (2)	
2006^{*}	(Switzerland) Roger Federer (3)	
2007^{*}	(Switzerland) Roger Federer (4)	
2008	Rafael Nadal (ESP)	
2009	(Switzerland) Roger Federer (5)	
2010	(Spain) Rafael Nadal (2)	
2011	Novak Djokovic (SRB)	
2012	(Serbia) Novak Djokovic (2)	
2013	(Spain) Rafael Nadal (3)	
2014	(Serbia) Novak Djokovic (3)	
2015^{*}	(Serbia) Novak Djokovic (4)	
2016	Andy Murray (GBR)	
2017	(Spain) Rafael Nadal (4)	
2018	(Serbia) Novak Djokovic (5)	
2019	(Spain) Rafael Nadal (5)	
2020	(Serbia) Novak Djokovic (6)	
2021^{*}	(Serbia) Novak Djokovic (7)	
2022	Carlos Alcaraz (ESP)	
2023	(Serbia) Novak Djokovic (8)	
2024	Jannik Sinner (ITA)	
2025	(Spain) Carlos Alcaraz (2)	
2026	Alexander Zverev (GER)	

=== Per player ===
No.	Total
8	(Serbia) Novak Djokovic
6	(United States) Pete Sampras
5	(United States) Jimmy Connors
5	(Switzerland) Roger Federer
5	(Spain) Rafael Nadal
4	(United States) John McEnroe
4	(Czechoslovakia) Ivan Lendl
2	(Sweden) Björn Borg
2	(Sweden) Stefan Edberg
2	(Australia) Lleyton Hewitt
2	(Spain) Carlos Alcaraz
1	(Romania) Ilie Năstase
1	(Sweden) Mats Wilander
1	(United States) Jim Courier
1	(United States) Andre Agassi
1	(Brazil) Gustavo Kuerten
1	(United States) Andy Roddick
1	(United Kingdom) Andy Murray
1	(Italy) Jannik Sinner
1	(Germany) Alexander Zverev

No.	Consecutive
6	(United States) Pete Sampras
5	(United States) Jimmy Connors
4	(United States) John McEnroe
4	(Switzerland) Roger Federer
3	(Czechoslovakia) Ivan Lendl
2	(Sweden) Björn Borg
2	(Sweden) Stefan Edberg
2	(Australia) Lleyton Hewitt
2	(Serbia) Novak Djokovic (x3)

== Players who became No. 1 without having won a Grand Slam ==
Player	First ranked No. 1	First Grand Slam final	First Grand Slam title	Ref.
(Czech Republic) Ivan Lendl	February 28, 1983	1981 French Open (1st of 19)	1984 French Open (1st of 8)	
(Chile) Marcelo Ríos	March 30, 1998	1998 Australian Open (only final)	None (retired in 2004)	

== Time span between first and last dates No. 1 was held ==
Current No. 1 player (date and age are updated automatically).
- Active players and age records indicated in **bold**.

Time span	Player	First held No. 1		Last held No. 1	
Time span	Player	Date	Age	Date	Age
14 years, 142 days	(Switzerland) Roger Federer	Feb 2, 2004	22 years, 178 days	Jun 24, 2018	36 years, 320 days
12 years, 341 days	(Serbia) **Novak Djokovic**	Jul 4, 2011	24 years, 43 days	Jun 9, 2024	**37 years, 18 days**
11 years, 168 days	(Spain) Rafael Nadal	Aug 18, 2008	22 years, 76 days	Feb 2, 2020	33 years, 244 days
8 years, 339 days	(United States) Jimmy Connors	Jul 29, 1974	21 years, 330 days	Jul 3, 1983	30 years, 304 days
8 years, 150 days	(United States) Andre Agassi	Apr 10, 1995	24 years, 346 days	Sep 7, 2003	33 years, 100 days
7 years, 221 days	(United States) Pete Sampras	Apr 12, 1993	21 years, 243 days	Nov 19, 2000	29 years, 99 days
7 years, 165 days	(Czechoslovakia) Ivan Lendl	Feb 28, 1983	22 years, 358 days	Aug 12, 1990	30 years, 158 days
5 years, 189 days	(United States) John McEnroe	Mar 3, 1980	21 years, 16 days	Sep 8, 1985	26 years, 204 days
3 years, 344 days	(Sweden) Björn Borg	Aug 23, 1977	21 years, 78 days	Aug 2, 1981	25 years, 57 days
3 years, 212 days	(Spain) **Carlos Alcaraz**	Sep 12, 2022	**19 years, 130 days**	Apr 12, 2026	22 years, 342 days
2 years, 144 days	(Italy) **Jannik Sinner**	Jun 10, 2024	22 years, 299 days	Nov 1, 2026	25 years, 77 days
2 years, 52 days	(Sweden) Stefan Edberg	Aug 13, 1990	24 years, 206 days	Oct 4, 1992	26 years, 259 days
1 year, 214 days	(United States) Jim Courier	Feb 10, 1992	21 years, 177 days	Sep 12, 1993	22 years, 360 days
1 year, 208 days	(Australia) Lleyton Hewitt	Nov 19, 2001	20 years, 268 days	Jun 15, 2003	22 years, 111 days
349 days	(Brazil) Gustavo Kuerten	Dec 4, 2000	24 years, 85 days	Nov 18, 2001	25 years, 69 days
286 days	(United Kingdom) Andy Murray	Nov 7, 2016	29 years, 176 days	Aug 20, 2017	30 years, 97 days
283 days	(Romania) Ilie Năstase	Aug 23, 1973	27 years, 35 days	Jun 2, 1974	27 years, 318 days
223 days	(Germany) Boris Becker	Jan 28, 1991	23 years, 67 days	Sep 8, 1991	23 years, 290 days
195 days	(Russia) **Daniil Medvedev**	Feb 28, 2022	26 years, 17 days	Sep 11, 2022	26 years, 212 days
153 days	(Russia) Marat Safin	Nov 20, 2000	20 years, 298 days	Apr 22, 2001	21 years, 85 days
146 days	(Chile) Marcelo Ríos	Mar 30, 1998	22 years, 94 days	Aug 23, 1998	22 years, 240 days
139 days	(Sweden) Mats Wilander	Sep 12, 1988	24 years, 21 days	Jan 29, 1989	24 years, 160 days
90 days	(United States) Andy Roddick	Nov 3, 2003	21 years, 65 days	Feb 1, 2004	21 years, 155 days
62 days	(Austria) Thomas Muster	Feb 12, 1996	28 years, 133 days	Apr 14, 1996	28 years, 195 days
55 days	(Australia) John Newcombe	Jun 3, 1974	30 years, 11 days	Jul 28, 1974	30 years, 66 days
55 days	(Spain) Juan Carlos Ferrero	Sep 8, 2003	23 years, 208 days	Nov 2, 2003	23 years, 263 days
41 days	(Russia) Yevgeny Kafelnikov	May 3, 1999	25 years, 74 days	Jun 13, 1999	25 years, 115 days
14 days	(Germany) **Alexander Zverev**	Nov 2, 2026	29 years, 196 days	November 16, 2026	29 years, 210 days
13 days	(Spain) Carlos Moyá	Mar 15, 1999	22 years, 200 days	Mar 28, 1999	22 years, 213 days
6 days	(Australia) Patrick Rafter	Jul 26, 1999	26 years, 210 days	Aug 1, 1999	26 years, 216 days

== Weeks at No. 1 by decade ==
- Current No. 1 player indicated in italic.

=== 1970s* ===
* — Starting in 1973

251	Connors

40	Năstase

33	Borg

8	Newcombe

=== 1980s ===
238	Lendl

170	McEnroe

76	Borg

20	Wilander

17	Connors

=== 1990s ===
276	Sampras

72	Edberg

58	Courier

51	Agassi

32	Lendl

12	Becker

6	Muster

6	Ríos

6	Kafelnikov

2	Moyá

1	Rafter

=== 2000s ===
262	Federer

80	Hewitt

50	Agassi

46	Nadal

43	Kuerten

13	Roddick

10	Sampras

9	Safin

8	Ferrero

=== 2010s ===
275	Djokovic

159	Nadal

48	Federer

41	Murray

=== 2020s ===
153	Djokovic

95	Sinner

66	Alcaraz

16	Medvedev

4	Nadal

3	Zverev

- Stats are automatically updated on Mondays (UTC).

== No. 1 players by country ==
Current No. 1 player indicated in bold.

Weeks	Country	Players
896	United States	Jimmy Connors, John McEnroe, Jim Courier, Pete Sampras, Andre Agassi, Andy Roddick
428	Serbia	Novak Djokovic
310	Switzerland	Roger Federer
285	Spain	Carlos Moyá, Juan Carlos Ferrero, Rafael Nadal, Carlos Alcaraz
270	Czechoslovakia	Ivan Lendl
201	Sweden	Björn Borg, Mats Wilander, Stefan Edberg
95	Italy	Jannik Sinner
89	Australia	John Newcombe, Patrick Rafter, Lleyton Hewitt
43	Brazil	Gustavo Kuerten
41	United Kingdom	Andy Murray
40	Romania	Ilie Năstase
16	Russia (Note: On March 1, 2022, the ATP announced that until further notice, players from Russia and Belarus would not be allowed to compete under the name or flag of Russia or Belarus following the 2022 Russian invasion of Ukraine. Daniil Medvedev thus competed under no nationality during all but his first week at number 1, and so only that week is attributed to Russia in the "Weeks at No. 1 by country" table.)	Yevgeny Kafelnikov, Marat Safin, Daniil Medvedev
**15**	**Germany**	Boris Becker, **Alexander Zverev**
6	Austria	Thomas Muster
6	Chile	Marcelo Ríos

Weeks are updated automatically.

== See also ==
- World number 1 ranked male tennis players (includes rankings before 1973)
- List of ATP number 1 ranked doubles tennis players
- List of WTA number 1 ranked singles tennis players
- List of WTA number 1 ranked doubles tennis players
- ITF World Champions
- Current ATP rankings
- ATP players with highest rank of 2 to 10
- Top ten ranked male tennis players
- Top ten ranked male tennis players (1912–1972)
- ATP rankings achievements – Men's singles
- List of highest ranked tennis players per country
