= 1984 French Open – Boys' singles =

Boys' singles
- 1984 French Open

Final
- Champion: (Sweden) Kent Carlsson
- Runner-up: (Australia) Mark Kratzmann
- Score: 6–3, 6–3

Events
Singles	men	women		boys	girls
Doubles	men	women	mixed	boys	girls
WC Singles	men	women	quad
WC Doubles	men	women	quad
Legends	−45	45+	women
← 1983 ·	French Open	· 1985 →

The 1984 French Open boys' singles tournament was an event during the 1984 French Open tennis tournament. Stefan Edberg was the defending champion, but did not compete in the Juniors in this year.

Kent Carlsson won in the final 6–3, 6–3, against Mark Kratzmann.

== Seeds ==
1. (Sweden) Kent Carlsson (champion)
2. (West Germany) Boris Becker (semifinals)
3. (United States) Brad Pearce (first round)
4. (United States) Patrick McEnroe (second round)
5. (Austria) Thomas Muster (third round)
6. (Australia) Mark Kratzmann (final)
7. (France) François Errard (second round)
8. (Socialist Federal Republic of Yugoslavia) Bruno Orešar (first round)
9. (South Africa) Marius Masencamp (first round)
10. (Argentina) Christian Miniussi (second round)
11. (France) Éric Winogradsky (first round)
12. (Italy) Nevio Devide (first round)
13. (Japan) Michihiro Ohta (second round)
14. N/A
15. (Peru) Jaime Yzaga (first round)
16. (Philippines) Felix Barrientos (first round)

== Draw ==
=== Key ===
- Q = Qualifier
- WC = Wild card
- LL = Lucky loser
- Alt = Alternate
- SE = Special exempt
- PR = Protected ranking
- ITF = ITF entry
- JE = Junior exempt
- w/o = Walkover
- r = Retired
- d = Defaulted
- SR = Special ranking

=== Finals ===
Quarterfinals
1	(Sweden) Kent Carlsson	6	6
(United States) Robbie Weiss	2	0
(Monaco) Gilles Ganancia	1	2
(United States) Luke Jensen	6	6
6	(Australia) Mark Kratzmann	4	6	6
(Italy) E Ricci	6	1	3
(Denmark) Michael Tauson	7	2	2
2	(West Germany) Boris Becker	6	6	6

Semifinals
1	(Sweden) Kent Carlsson	6	6
(United States) Luke Jensen	2	4
6	(Australia) Mark Kratzmann	6	4	7
2	(West Germany) Boris Becker	4	6	5

Final
1	(Sweden) Kent Carlsson	6	6
6	(Australia) Mark Kratzmann	3	3

=== Top half ===
==== Section 1 ====
First round
1	(Sweden) Kent Carlsson	6	6
(France) Philippe Lacombrade	0	2
(United Kingdom) Richard Whichello	6	6
(Italy) Ivano Cappelloni	1	2
(France) Philippe Gardarein	6	7
(Australia) David Macpherson	3	6
(Czechoslovakia) Cyril Suk	7	6
12	(Italy) Nevio Devide	6	2
7	(France) François Errard	6	6
(Argentina) Franco Davín	2	2
(Soviet Union) Andrei Chesnokov	4	6
(France) Gregorie Tournant	6	7
(Chile) Manuel Rodríguez	2	6
(United States) Robbie Weiss	7	6
(United States) M Borchardt	0	0
13	(Japan) Michihiro Ohta	6	6

Second round
1	(Sweden) K Carlsson	6	6
(United Kingdom) R Whichello	2	2
(France) P Gardarein	4	3
(Czechoslovakia) C Suk	6	6
7	(France) F Errard	7	6	4
(France) G Tournant	6	7	6
(United States) R Weiss	3	6	6
13	(Japan) M Ohta	6	1	1

Third round
1	(Sweden) K Carlsson	6	6
(Czechoslovakia) C Suk	2	0
(France) G Tournant	2	3
(United States) R Weiss	6	6

Quarterfinals
1	(Sweden) K Carlsson	6	6
(United States) R Weiss	2	0

==== Section 2 ====
First round
4	(United States) Patrick McEnroe	6	6
(France) Thierry Van Den Daele	1	4
(Belgium) Denis Langaskens	7	2	6
(France) Thierry Champion	5	6	4
(Philippines) Antonio del Rosario	6	6
(United Kingdom) Michael Walker	4	3
(Monaco) Gilles Ganancia	5	7	6
11	(France) Éric Winogradsky	7	5	0
8	(Socialist Federal Republic of Yugoslavia) Bruno Orešar	1	2
(Chile) Luke Jensen	6	6
(Japan) Ryuso Tsujino	6	0
(Switzerland) Stefan Bienz	7	6
(Netherlands) Marc van Eekeren	2	1
(Mexico) Leonardo Lavalle	6	6
(Morocco) Arafat Chekrouni	6	3	6
9	(South Africa) Marius Masencamp	1	6	2

Second round
4	(United States) P McEnroe	4	6
(Belgium) D Langaskens	6	7
(Philippines) A del Rosario	4	6	8
(Monaco) G Ganancia	6	4	10
(United States) L Jensen	6	6
(Switzerland) S Bienz	3	1
(Mexico) L Lavalle	6	6
(Morocco) A Chekrouni	3	2

Third round
(Belgium) D Langaskens	4	6
(Monaco) G Ganancia	6	7
(United States) L Jensen	6	6
(Mexico) L Lavalle	2	3

Quarterfinals
(Monaco) G Ganancia	1	2
(United States) L Jensen	6	6

=== Bottom half ===
==== Section 3 ====
First round
16	(Philippines) Felix Barrientos	3	4
(West Germany) Patrik Kühnen	6	6
(Spain) Fernando García Lleó	6	4
(Canada) Andrew Sznajder	7	6
(Czechoslovakia) Petr Korda	6	4
(Austria) Alex Antonitsch	7	6
(South Africa) Stefan Kruger	1	0
6	(Australia) Mark Kratzmann	6	6
10	(Argentina) Christian Miniussi	6	1	6
(Australia) Brett Custer	3	6	2
(Pakistan) Haseeb Aslam	1	4
(Italy) E Ricci	6	6
(Netherlands) Christian Feenstra	6	6
(Romania) Mihnea-Ion Năstase	4	1
(France) Olivier Cayla	6	6	6
3	(United States) Brad Pearce	1	7	3

Second round
(West Germany) P Kühnen	6	6
(Canada) A Sznajder	4	4
(Austria) A Antonitsch	0	2
6	(Australia) M Kratzmann	6	6
10	(Argentina) C Miniussi	3	2
(Italy) E Ricci	6	6
(Netherlands) C Feenstra	0	3
(France) O Cayla	6	6

Third round
(West Germany) P Kühnen	2	0^{r}
6	(Australia) M Kratzmann	6	4
(Italy) E Ricci	4	6	6
(France) O Cayla	6	2	2

Quarterfinals
6	(Australia) M Kratzmann	4	6	6
(Italy) E Ricci	6	1	3

==== Section 4 ====
First round
(Mexico) Agustín Moreno	5	6	6
(West Germany) Carl-Uwe Steeb	7	4	3
(Venezuela) Valerio Boccito	3	0
(Denmark) Michael Tauson	6	6
(Netherlands) Vince van Gelderen	6	4	1
(France) Olivier Delaître	3	6	6
(United Kingdom) Jason Goodall	3	5
5	(Austria) Thomas Muster	6	7
15	(Peru) Jaime Yzaga	3	3
(France) R Simon	6	6
(Spain) SC Castello	3	6	6
(France) Franck Peyre	6	1	1
(South Africa) Dean Johnson	7	4	0
(Austria) Horst Skoff	5	6	6
(United States) Ricky Brown	1	3
2	(West Germany) Boris Becker	6	6

Second round
(Mexico) A Moreno	4	3
(Denmark) M Tauson	6	6
(France) O Delaître	2	6	2
5	(Austria) T Muster	6	1	6
(France) R Simon	7	3	13
(Spain) SC Castello	5	6	11
(Austria) H Skoff	4	6	2
2	(West Germany) B Becker	6	3	6

Third round
(Denmark) M Tauson	6	6
5	(Austria) T Muster	4	2
(France) R Simon	4	3
2	(West Germany) B Becker	6	6

Quarterfinals
(Denmark) M Tauson	7	2	2
2	(West Germany) B Becker	6	6	6
