= 1984 French Open – Mixed doubles =

Mixed doubles
- 1984 French Open

Final
- Champion: (United States) Dick Stockton (United States) Anne Smith
- Runner-up: (Australia) Laurie Warder (Australia) Anne Minter
- Score: 6–2, 6–4

Details
- Draw: 48

Events
Singles	men	women		boys	girls
Doubles	men	women	mixed	boys	girls
WC Singles	men	women	quad
WC Doubles	men	women	quad
Legends	−45	45+	women
- French Open

The mixed doubles tournament at the 1984 French Open was held from 26 May until 10 June 1984 on the outdoor clay courts at the Stade Roland Garros in Paris, France. Dick Stockton and Anne Smith won the title, defeating Laurie Warder and Anne Minter in the final.

== Seeds ==
1. (United States) Sherwood Stewart / (Australia) Elizabeth Sayers (quarterfinals)
2. (France) Henri Leconte / (Hungary) Andrea Temesvári (second round)
3. (United States) Mel Purcell / (United States) Paula Smith (second round)
4. (United States) Charles Strode / (United States) Leslie Allen (second round)
5. (United States) Dick Stockton / (United States) Anne Smith (champions)
6. (United States) Scott Davis / (United States) Barbara Jordan (quarterfinals)
7. (Sweden) Hans Simonsson / (United States) Kathy Rinaldi (second round)
8. (United States) Eric Korita / (United States) Lisa Bonder (second round)

== Draw ==
Key

- Q = Qualifier
- WC = Wild card
- LL = Lucky loser
- Alt = Alternate
- ITF = ITF entry
- PR = Protected ranking
- SR = Special ranking
- SE = Special exempt
- JE = Junior exempt
- JR = Junior Accelerator Programme entrant
- CO = College Accelerator Programme entrant
- NG = Next Gen Accelerator Program entrant
- w/o = Walkover
- r = Retired
- d = Defaulted

=== Finals ===
Quarterfinals
1	(United States) Sherwood Stewart (Australia) Elizabeth Sayers	6	1	7
5	(United States) Dick Stockton (United States) Anne Smith	2	6	9
(Australia) Charlie Fancutt (France) Marie-Christine Calleja	7	3	6
(United States) Charles Cox (United States) Wendy White	6	6	3
6	(United States) Scott Davis (United States) Barbara Jordan	6	6	3
(Australia) David Graham (Australia) Pam Whytcross	7	3	6
(Australia) Laurie Warder (Australia) Anne Minter	3	6	7
(Peru) Pablo Arraya (Peru) Laura Arraya	6	4	5

Semifinals
5	(United States) Dick Stockton (United States) Anne Smith	7	6
(Australia) Charlie Fancutt (France) Marie-Christine Calleja	6	3
(Australia) David Graham (Australia) Pam Whytcross	2	6
(Australia) Laurie Warder (Australia) Anne Minter	6	7

Final
5	(United States) Dick Stockton (United States) Anne Smith	6	6
(Australia) Laurie Warder (Australia) Anne Minter	2	4

=== Top half ===
==== Section 1 ====
First round
(Czechoslovakia) P Složil (Austria) P Huber	6	6
(United Kingdom) C Dowdeswell (United Kingdom) A Croft	2	3
(United States) B Foxworth (France) N Herreman	6	7
(Chile) B Prajoux (Chile) M Rodríguez	2	5
(France) D Bedel (France) C Tanvier	4	7	6
(South Africa) C van Rensburg (South Africa) B Mould	6	6	2
(South Africa) D Tarr (South Africa) R Uys	6	6
(Socialist Federal Republic of Yugoslavia) B Orešar (United States) S Foltz	0	1

Second round
1	(United States) S Stewart (Australia) E Sayers	6	3	6
(Czechoslovakia) P Složil (Austria) P Huber	3	6	3
(United States) B Foxworth (France) N Herreman	7	6	3
(France) T Pham (France) C Suire	6	7	6
(Australia) M Fancutt (United States) C Reynolds	7	7
(France) D Bedel (France) C Tanvier	5	5
(South Africa) D Tarr (South Africa) R Uys
5	(United States) D Stockton (United States) A Smith	w/o

Third round
1	(United States) S Stewart (Australia) E Sayers	3	6	9
(France) T Pham (France) C Suire	6	1	7
(Australia) M Fancutt (United States) C Reynolds	6	6	4
5	(United States) D Stockton (United States) A Smith	4	7	6

Quarterfinals
1	(United States) S Stewart (Australia) E Sayers	6	1	7
5	(United States) D Stockton (United States) A Smith	2	6	9

==== Section 2 ====
First round
(United States) S Brawley (United States) S Margolin
(United States) M Leach (Bulgaria) M Maleeva	w/o
(Australia) C Fancutt (France) M-C Calleja	3	6	6
(United States) F Taygan (United States) S Mascarin	6	2	4
(Brazil) E Oncins (Australia) A Tobin	w/o
(South Africa) B Levine (South Africa) Y Vermaak
(Australia) M Kratzmann (Australia) J Byrne	w/o
(United States) B Gilbert (Canada) C Bassett

Second round
4	(United States) C Strode (United States) L Allen	6	1	2
(United States) M Leach (Bulgaria) M Maleeva	2	6	6
(Australia) C Fancutt (France) M-C Calleja	6	7	6
(Brazil) G Barbosa (Brazil) P Medrado	7	5	2
(United States) B Cox (United States) W White	w/o
(Brazil) E Oncins (Australia) A Tobin
(Australia) M Kratzmann (Australia) J Byrne	6	6
7	(Sweden) H Simonsson (United States) K Rinaldi	4	3

Third round
(United States) M Leach (Bulgaria) M Maleeva	6	4	7
(Australia) C Fancutt (France) M-C Calleja	2	6	9
(United States) B Cox (United States) W White	6	6
(Australia) M Kratzmann (Australia) J Byrne	2	4

Quarterfinals
(Australia) C Fancutt (France) M-C Calleja	7	3	6
(United States) B Cox (United States) W White	6	6	3

=== Bottom half ===
==== Section 3 ====
First round
(United States) D Ralston (United States) M Van Nostrand	4	4
(United Kingdom) J Feaver (United Kingdom) V Wade	6	6
(France) J Vanier (France) C Vanier	6	2	9
(Spain) A Tous (United States) C Christian	2	6	11
(Australia) D Graham (Australia) P Whytcross	6	6
(Argentina) G Guerrero (Argentina) G Castro	2	0
(Republic of Ireland) M Doyle (United States) S Rimes	4
(Poland) W Fibak (Poland) I Kuczyńska	6	6

Second round
6	(United States) S Davis (United States) B Jordan	6	4	7
(United Kingdom) J Feaver (United Kingdom) V Wade	2	6	5
(Spain) A Tous (United States) C Christian	3	4
(Zimbabwe) H Ismail (United States) K Sands	6	6
(Paraguay) F González (United States) P Teeguarden	1	2
(Australia) D Graham (Australia) P Whytcross	6	6
(Poland) W Fibak (Poland) I Kuczyńska	6	6
3	(United States) M Purcell (United States) P Smith	4	2

Third round
6	(United States) S Davis (United States) B Jordan	3	6	8
(Zimbabwe) H Ismail (United States) K Sands	6	3	6
(Australia) D Graham (Australia) P Whytcross	5	6	6
3	(Poland) W Fibak (Poland) I Kuczyńska	7	3	4

Quarterfinals
6	(United States) S Davis (United States) B Jordan	6	6	3
(Australia) D Graham (Australia) P Whytcross	7	3	6

==== Section 4 ====
First round
(Australia) L Warder (Australia) A Minter	6	6
(Chile) P Rodríguez (France) F Duxin	3	2
(Bolivia) M Martinez (United States) M Brown	6	3	4
(United States) R Crowley (France) N Phan-Thanh	3	6	6
(Australia) S Ball (United States) K Shaefer
(Peru) P Arraya (Peru) L Arraya	w/o
(United States) C Dunk (United States) A White	7	6
(Chile) J Fillol (United States) P Casale	5	2

Second round
8	(United States) E Korita (United States) L Bonder	2	3
(Australia) L Warder (Australia) A Minter	6	6
(United States) R Crowley (France) N Phan-Thanh	6	4
(United States) C Wittus (United States) S Solomon	7	6
(United States) E Fromm (Romania) L Romanov	4	2
(Peru) P Arraya (Peru) L Arraya	6	6
(United States) C Dunk (United States) A White	3	6	6
2	(France) H Leconte (Hungary) A Temesvári	6	4	4

Third round
(Australia) L Warder (Australia) A Minter	w/o
(United States) C Wittus (United States) S Solomon
(Peru) P Arraya (Peru) L Arraya	6	6	9
(United States) C Dunk (United States) A White	3	7	7

Quarterfinals
(Australia) L Warder (Australia) A Minter	3	6	7
(Peru) P Arraya (Peru) L Arraya	6	4	5
