= 1983 French Open – Boys' singles =

Boys' singles
- 1983 French Open

Final
- Champion: (Sweden) Stefan Edberg
- Runner-up: (France) Franck Fevrier
- Score: 2–6, 6–2, 6–1

Events
Singles	men	women		boys	girls
Doubles	men	women	mixed	boys	girls
WC Singles	men	women	quad
WC Doubles	men	women	quad
Legends	−45	45+	women
← 1982 ·	French Open	· 1984 →

The 1983 French Open boys' singles tournament was an event during the 1983 French Open tennis tournament. Tarik Benhabiles was the defending champion but lost in the quarterfinals.

Stefan Edberg won in the final 2–6, 6–2, 6–1, against Franck Fevrier.

== Draw ==
=== Key ===
- Q = Qualifier
- WC = Wild card
- LL = Lucky loser
- Alt = Alternate
- SE = Special exempt
- PR = Protected ranking
- ITF = ITF entry
- JE = Junior exempt
- w/o = Walkover
- r = Retired
- d = Defaulted
- SR = Special ranking

=== Finals ===
Quarterfinals
(Sweden) Stefan Edberg	6	6	10
(Spain) Emilio Sánchez	7	4	8
(West Germany) Tore Meinecke	6	2	0
(Monaco) Eric Carlier	3	6	6
(France) Franck Fevrier	w/o
(France) Thierry Champion
(Spain) Jorge Bardou	6	3	7
(France) Tarik Benhabiles	1	6	5

Semifinals
(Sweden) Stefan Edberg	6	6
(Monaco) Eric Carlier	4	6
(France) Franck Fevrier	6	7
' (Spain) Jorge Bardou	4	5

Final
(Sweden) Stefan Edberg	2	6	6
(Netherlands) Franck Fevrier	6	2	1

=== Top half ===
==== Section 1 ====
First round
(Sweden) Stefan Edberg	6	6
(Ecuador) Martin Aguirre	0	0
(Romania) Mihnea Nastase	6	2	2
(Denmark) Michael Tauson	3	6	6
(West Germany) Udo Riglewski	6	2	6
(Italy) Guido Possamai	4	6	0
(France) Olivier Cayla	1	0
(United States) Bill Stanley	6	6
(Czech Republic) Karel Nováček	6	6	6
(South Africa) Royce Deppe	3	7	1
(France) Philippe Haliot	0	0
(Australia) Mark Kratzmann	6	6
(France) François Errard	5	3
(Austria) Alex Antonitsch	7	6
(United Kingdom) Jason Clunie	1	2
(Spain) Emilio Sánchez	6	6

Second round
(Sweden) S Edberg	1	6	6
(Denmark) M Tauson	6	1	3
(West Germany) U Riglewski	4	2
(United States) B Stanley	6	6
(Czechoslovakia) K Nováček	6	7
(Australia) M Kratzmann	3	6
(Austria) A Antonitsch	1	3
(Spain) E Sánchez	6	6

Third round
(Sweden) S Edberg	4	6	6
(United States) B Stanley	6	3	2
(Czechoslovakia) K Nováček	3	3
(Spain) E Sánchez	6	6

Quarterfinals
(Sweden) S Edberg	6	6	10
(Spain) E Sánchez	7	4	8

==== Section 2 ====
First round
(West Germany) Tore Meinecke	6	6
(Italy) Michele Fioroni	3	2
(Sweden) Johan Carlsson	6	5	4
(Chile) Manual Rodriguez	0	7	6
(Australia) Simon Youl	6	6
(Switzerland) Claudio Mezzadri	3	2
(France) Éric Winogradsky	6	6
(Brazil) Carlos Chabalgoity	2	3
(France) Franck Hamonet	6	6
(Chile) J Chen	3	3
(South Africa) Marius Masencamp	7	3	6
(United States) Eric Amend	6	6	1
(Soviet Union) Andrei Chesnokov	5	6	6
(Spain) Fernando Garcia-Lleo	7	2	2
(Argentina) Gustavo Garetto	2	2
(Monaco) Eric Carlier	6	6

Second round
(West Germany) T Meinecke	7	6
(Chile) M Rodriguez	6	0
(Australia) S Youl	7	6
(France) É Winogradsky	5	2
(France) F Hamonet	6	6
(South Africa) M Macencamp	1	2
(Soviet Union) A Chesnokov	2	2
(Monaco) E Carlier	6	6

Third round
(West Germany) T Meinecke	6	7
(Australia) S Youl	2	6
(France) F Hamonet	2	6	2
(Monaco) E Carlier	6	3	6

Quarterfinals
(West Germany) T Meinecke	6	2	0
(Monaco) E Carlier	3	6	6

=== Bottom half ===
==== Section 3 ====
First round
(Italy) Paolo Canè	4	4
(France) Franck Fevrier	6	6
(Chile) Patricio Apey	1	0
(Australia) John Frawley	6	6
(West Germany) Ivo Pastika	6	6
(United Kingdom) Peter Moore	4	4
(Peru) Jaime Yzaga	2	1
(Sweden) Kent Carlsson	6	6
(South Africa) Dean Johnson	1	3
(Spain) David De Miguel-Lapiedra	6	6
(Soviet Union) Andrei Olhovskiy	3	6
(France) Thierry Champion	6	7
(Brazil) Fernando Roese	1	4
(West Germany) Boris Becker	6	6
(Netherlands) Mark Koevermans	2	1
(United States) Aaron Krickstein	6	6

Second round
(France) F Fevrier	5	6	6
(Australia) J Frawley	7	2	3
(West Germany) I Pastika	0	0
(Sweden) K Carlsson	6	6
(Spain) D De Miguel-Lapiedra	6	0	4
(France) T Champion	4	6	6
(West Germany) B Becker	4	6
(United States) A Krickstein	6	7

Third round
(France) F Fevrier	0	6	6
(Sweden) K Carlsson	6	3	1
(France) T Champion	7	6
(United States) A Krickstein	6	3

Quarterfinals
(France) F Fevrier	w/o
(France) T Champion

==== Section 4 ====
First round
(Sweden) Christer Allgårdh	6	6
(Mexico) Agustín Moreno	4	3
(Belgium) Denis Langaskens	6	6
(Italy) Gianluca Pozzi	4	3
(South Africa) Gustav Fichardt	4	7	4
(France) Gregoire Tournant	6	6	6
(Canada) Grant Connell	0	3
(Spain) Jorge Bardou	6	6
(Greece) Anastasios Bavelas	4	1
(France) Philippe Lacombrade	6	6
(Portugal) J Santiago	3	0
(United States) Robbie Weiss	6	6
(Bulgaria) Krassimir Lazarov	6	6	6
(Switzerland) J Leif	2	7	1
(Jamaica) Noel Rutherford	1	4
(France) Tarik Benhabiles	6	6

Second round
(Sweden) C Allgårdh	6	7
(Belgium) D Langaskens	2	5
(France) G Tournant	2	4
(Spain) J Bardou	6	6
(France) P Lacombrade	3	3
(United States) R Weiss	6	6
(Bulgaria) K Lazarov	4	3
(France) T Benhabiles	6	6

Third round
(Sweden) C Allgårdh	4	1
(Spain) J Bardou	6	6
(United States) R Weiss	7	3	9
(France) T Benhabiles	5	6	11

Quarterfinals
(Spain) J Bardou	6	3	7
(France) T Benhabiles	1	6	5
