= Marie-Christine Calleja =

French tennis player

- Full name: Marie-Christine Calleja
- Country (sports): France
- Born: 14 January 1964 (age 61)
- Retired: 1989
- Prize money: $105,301

Singles
- Career record: 72-79
- Career titles: 2
- Highest ranking: No. 33

Grand Slam singles results
- Australian Open: 3R (1987)
- French Open: 3R (1984, 1985)
- Wimbledon: 3R (1986)
- US Open: 2R (1984)

Doubles
- Career record: 10-11
- Highest ranking: No. 505 (15 August 1988)

Grand Slam doubles results
- French Open: 1R (1984, 1988)

Grand Slam mixed doubles results
- French Open: SF (1984)

Marie-Christine Calleja (born 14 January 1964) is a former professional tennis player from France.

== Biography ==
Calleja played on the professional tour in the 1980s. Her best performances on the WTA Tour were quarter-final appearances at Brighton in 1983 and Nashville in 1984.

She was a member of the French team which competed at the 1984 Federation Cup, playing the opening singles rubber of three ties, including the quarter-final loss to eventual champions Czechoslovakia.

As a doubles player she was a semi-finalist at the 1984 French Open, teaming up with Australia's Charlie Fancutt in the mixed doubles.

== See also ==
- List of France Fed Cup team representatives
