= 1984 French Open – Women's doubles =

Women's doubles
- 1984 French Open

Final
- Champion: (United States) Martina Navratilova (United States) Pam Shriver
- Runner-up: (West Germany) Claudia Kohde-Kilsch (Czechoslovakia) Hana Mandlíková
- Score: 5–7, 6–3, 6–2

Details
- Draw: 64
- Seeds: 16

Events
| Singles | men | women | | boys | girls |
| Doubles | men | women | mixed | boys | girls |
| WC Singles | men | women | quad |
| WC Doubles | men | women | quad |
| Legends | −45 | 45+ | women |
| ← 1983 · | French Open | · 1985 → |

Martina Navratilova and Pam Shriver defeated Claudia Kohde-Kilsch and Hana Mandlíková in the final, 5–7, 6–3, 6–2 to win the women's double tennis title at the 1984 French Open. It was the first step in an eventual Grand Slam for the pair.

Rosalyn Fairbank and Candy Reynolds were the defending champions, but lost in the second round to Kim Sands and Corinne Vanier.

== Seeds ==
1. (United States) Martina Navratilova / (United States) Pam Shriver (champions)
2. (South Africa) Rosalyn Fairbank / (United States) Candy Reynolds (second round)
3. (United Kingdom) Jo Durie / (United Kingdom) Anne Hobbs (third round)
4. (United States) Kathy Jordan / (United States) Anne Smith (quarterfinals)
5. (Switzerland) Christiane Jolissaint / (Netherlands) Marcella Mesker (second round)
6. (West Germany) Claudia Kohde-Kilsch / (Czechoslovakia) Hana Mandlíková (final)
7. (Socialist Federal Republic of Yugoslavia) Mima Jaušovec / (United States) Betsy Nagelsen (quarterfinals)
8. (United States) Kathy Horvath / (Romania) Virginia Ruzici (semifinals)
9. (United States) Barbara Jordan / (Australia) Elizabeth Sayers (semifinals)
10. (United States) Leslie Allen / (United States) Anne White (third round)
11. (United States) Zina Garrison / (United States) Lori McNeil (first round)
12. (United States) Sandy Collins / (United States) Alycia Moulton (third round)
13. (West Germany) Bettina Bunge / (West Germany) Eva Pfaff (first round)
14. (Czechoslovakia) Helena Suková / (United Kingdom) Virginia Wade (third round)
15. (Brazil) Cláudia Monteiro / (South Africa) Yvonne Vermaak (first round)
16. (Argentina) Ivanna Madruga-Osses / (United States) Kathy Rinaldi (first round)

== Draw ==
=== Key ===
- Q = Qualifier
- WC = Wild card
- LL = Lucky loser
- Alt = Alternate
- SE = Special exempt
- PR = Protected ranking
- ITF = ITF entry
- JE = Junior exempt
- w/o = Walkover
- r = Retired
- d = Defaulted
- SR = Special ranking

=== Finals ===
Quarterfinals
1 | (United States) Martina Navratilova (United States) Pam Shriver | 6 | 6
(Australia) Brenda Remilton (Japan) Naoko Sato | 2 | 2
4 | (United States) Kathy Jordan (United States) Anne Smith | 6 | 4 | 3
8 | (United States) Kathy Horvath (Romania) Virginia Ruzici | 2 | 6 | 6
7 | (Socialist Federal Republic of Yugoslavia) Mima Jaušovec (United States) Betsy Nagelsen | 5 | 6 | 5
9 | (United States) Barbara Jordan (Australia) Elizabeth Sayers | 7 | 4 | 7
6 | (West Germany) Claudia Kohde-Kilsch (Czechoslovakia) Hana Mandlíková | 6 | 4 | 6
(United States) Camille Benjamin (United States) Felicia Raschiatore | 3 | 6 | 1

Semifinals
1 | (United States) Martina Navratilova (United States) Pam Shriver | 6 | 7
8 | (United States) Kathy Horvath (Romania) Virginia Ruzici | 0 | 6^{6}
9 | (United States) Barbara Jordan (Australia) Elizabeth Sayers | 7 | 3 | 4
6 | (West Germany) Claudia Kohde-Kilsch (Czechoslovakia) Hana Mandlíková | 6^{4} | 6 | 6

Final
1 | (United States) Martina Navratilova (United States) Pam Shriver | 5 | 6 | 6
6 | (West Germany) Claudia Kohde-Kilsch (Czechoslovakia) Hana Mandlíková | 7 | 3 | 2

=== Top half ===
==== Section 1 ====
First round
1 | (United States) M Navratilova (United States) P Shriver | 6 | 6
(United States) H Crowe (United States) K Steinmetz | 2 | 1
(Hong Kong) P Hy (Japan) M Yanagi | 6^{0} | 6^{8}
(Canada) C Bassett (Hungary) A Temesvári | 7 | 7
(United States) L Antonoplis (United States) K Shaefer | 6 | 3 | 6
(Sweden) C Jexell (United States) J Klitch | 1 | 6 | 1
(Soviet Union) E Eliseenko (Soviet Union) N Reva | 2 | 1
12 | (United States) S Collins (United States) A Moulton | 6 | 6
16 | (Argentina) I Madruga-Osses (United States) K Rinaldi | 5 | 2
(Australia) A Minter (United States) J Mundel | 7 | 6
(Czechoslovakia) Y Brzáková (Czechoslovakia) L Plchová | 3 | 1
(Australia) B Remilton (Japan) N Sato | 6 | 6
(South Africa) R Uys (Peru) P Vásquez | 6 | 6
(United States) A Holton (United States) K Holton | 4 | 1
(United States) J Harrington (United States) V Nelson | 1 | 2
5 | (Switzerland) C Jolissaint (Netherlands) M Mesker | 6 | 6

Second round
1 | (United States) M Navratilova (United States) P Shriver | 6 | 6
(Canada) C Bassett (Hungary) A Temesvári | 4 | 2
(United States) L Antonoplis (United States) K Shaefer | 6^{2} | 3
12 | (United States) S Collins (United States) A Moulton | 7 | 6
(Australia) A Minter (United States) J Mundel | 6 | 5 | 4
(Australia) B Remilton (Japan) N Sato | 3 | 7 | 6
(South Africa) R Uys (Peru) P Vásquez | 6 | 7
5 | (Switzerland) C Jolissaint (Netherlands) M Mesker | 3 | 5

Third round
1 | (United States) M Navratilova (United States) P Shriver | 6 | 6
12 | (United States) S Collins (United States) A Moulton | 2 | 4
(Australia) B Remilton (Japan) N Sato | 7 | 6
(South Africa) R Uys (Peru) P Vásquez | 5 | 0

Quarterfinals
1 | (United States) M Navratilova (United States) P Shriver | 6 | 6
(Australia) B Remilton (Japan) N Sato | 2 | 2

==== Section 2 ====
First round
4 | (United States) K Jordan (United States) A Smith | 6 | 6
Alt | (United States) M-A Colville (United States) D Rubin | 3 | 2
(Czechoslovakia) I Budařová (Czechoslovakia) M Skuherská | 6 | 6
(United States) T Phelps (United States) M Torres | 4 | 1
(United States) R Blount (United States) K Copeland | 6^{5} | 5
(France) F Dürr (France) F Duxin | 7 | 7
(United States) H Manset (United States) S Margolin | 2 | 0
14 | (Czechoslovakia) H Suková (United Kingdom) V Wade | 6 | 6
10 | (United States) L Allen (United States) A White | 6 | 6
(United States) G Purdy (Italy) R Reggi | 1 | 2
(United Kingdom) S Barker (United Kingdom) A Croft | 6 | 6
(United States) J Golder (United States) K Latham | 2 | 2
(United States) B Gerken (United States) B Herr | 2 | 3
(France) N Herreman (France) C Suire | 6 | 6
(United States) P Teeguarden (Australia) P Whytcross | 0 | 3
8 | (United States) K Horvath (Romania) V Ruzici | 6 | 6

Second round
4 | (United States) K Jordan (United States) A Smith | 6 | 6
(Czechoslovakia) I Budařová (Czechoslovakia) M Skuherská | 2 | 3
(France) F Dürr (France) F Duxin | 1 | 3
14 | (Czechoslovakia) H Suková (United Kingdom) V Wade | 6 | 6
10 | (United States) L Allen (United States) A White | 6 | 6
(United Kingdom) S Barker (United Kingdom) A Croft | 3 | 2
(France) N Herreman (France) C Suire | 0 | 6 | 1
8 | (United States) K Horvath (Romania) V Ruzici | 6 | 1 | 6

Third round
4 | (United States) K Jordan (United States) A Smith | 7 | 3 | 6
14 | (Czechoslovakia) H Suková (United Kingdom) V Wade | 6^{5} | 6 | 3
10 | (United States) L Allen (United States) A White | 1 | 1
8 | (United States) K Horvath (Romania) V Ruzici | 6 | 6

Quarterfinals
4 | (United States) K Jordan (United States) A Smith | 6 | 4 | 3
8 | (United States) K Horvath (Romania) V Ruzici | 2 | 6 | 6

=== Bottom half ===
==== Section 3 ====
First round
7 | (Socialist Federal Republic of Yugoslavia) M Jaušovec (United States) B Nagelsen | 6 | 6
(United States) B Bramblett (Czechoslovakia) H Strachoňová | 0 | 1
(West Germany) S Graf (Socialist Federal Republic of Yugoslavia) R Šašak | 6^{5} | 6 | 9
(Soviet Union) L Savchenko (Czechoslovakia) R Tomanová | 7 | 3 | 7
(Poland) I Kuczyńska (Australia) S Leo | 6 | 6
(United States) C Christian (United States) S Foltz | 4 | 3
(Canada) J Hetherington (Canada) H Pelletier | 7 | 6
13 | (West Germany) B Bunge (West Germany) E Pfaff | 5 | 3
9 | (United States) B Jordan (Australia) E Sayers | 6 | 6
(United States) A Henricksson (South Africa) B Mould | 4 | 2
(United States) S Rimes (United States) S Solomon | 6 | 4 | 6
(Switzerland) P Delhees (Czechoslovakia) K Skronská | 2 | 6 | 2
(United States) P Casale (United States) K Keil | 6 | 7
(United States) L Bonder (United States) S Mascarin | 2 | 5
(Australia) J Byrne (Australia) A Tobin | 6 | 6
3 | (United Kingdom) J Durie (United Kingdom) A Hobbs | 1 | 1

Second round
7 | (Socialist Federal Republic of Yugoslavia) M Jaušovec (United States) B Nagelsen | 6 | 7
(West Germany) S Graf (Socialist Federal Republic of Yugoslavia) R Šašak | 2 | 5
(Poland) I Kuczyńska (Australia) S Leo | 7 | 4 | 6
(Canada) J Hetherington (Canada) H Pelletier | 6 | 6 | 4
9 | (United States) B Jordan (Australia) E Sayers | 6 | 6
(United States) S Rimes (United States) S Solomon | 0 | 3
(United States) P Casale (United States) K Keil | 0 | 3
(Australia) J Byrne (Australia) A Tobin | 6 | 6

Third round
7 | (Socialist Federal Republic of Yugoslavia) M Jaušovec (United States) B Nagelsen | 3 | 7 | 6
(Canada) J Hetherington (Canada) H Pelletier | 6 | 5 | 3
9 | (United States) B Jordan (Australia) E Sayers | 6 | 7
(Australia) J Byrne (Australia) A Tobin | 3 | 6^{10}

Quarterfinals
7 | (Socialist Federal Republic of Yugoslavia) M Jaušovec (United States) B Nagelsen | 5 | 6 | 5
9 | (United States) B Jordan (Australia) E Sayers | 7 | 4 | 7

==== Section 4 ====
First round
6 | (West Germany) C Kohde-Kilsch (Czechoslovakia) H Mandlíková | 6 | 6
(Peru) L Arraya (Argentina) E Longo | 2 | 0
(United States) P Barg (United States) L Bernstein | 6 | 6
(France) S Amiach (Brazil) P Medrado | 2 | 3
(Bulgaria) M Maleeva (Romania) L Romanov | 6 | 6
(United Kingdom) R Einy (Australia) N Gregory | 4 | 2
(Socialist Federal Republic of Yugoslavia) S Goleš (Austria) P Huber | 6 | 6
15 | (Brazil) C Monteiro (South Africa) Y Vermaak | 4 | 3
11 | (United States) Z Garrison (United States) L McNeil | 5 | 4
(United States) P Smith (United States) W White | 7 | 6
(United States) C Benjamin (United States) F Raschiatore | 6 | 3 | 6
(United States) T Mochizuki (Romania) M Romanov | 3 | 6 | 3
(United States) K Sands (France) C Vanier | 6 | 2 | 6
(Switzerland) L Drescher (Japan) E Inoue | 4 | 6 | 2
(France) M-C Calleja (France) G Lovera-Benedetti | 4 | 2
2 | (South Africa) R Fairbank (United States) C Reynolds | 6 | 6

Second round
6 | (West Germany) C Kohde-Kilsch (Czechoslovakia) H Mandlíková | 6 | 6
(United States) P Barg (United States) L Bernstein | 0 | 1
(Bulgaria) M Maleeva (Romania) L Romanov | 4 | 5
(Socialist Federal Republic of Yugoslavia) S Goleš (Austria) P Huber | 6 | 7
11 | (United States) P Smith (United States) W White | 4 | 6 | 3
(United States) C Benjamin (United States) F Raschiatore | 6 | 1 | 6
(United States) K Sands (France) C Vanier | 7 | 6
2 | (South Africa) R Fairbank (United States) C Reynolds | 6^{4} | 2

Third round
6 | (West Germany) C Kohde-Kilsch (Czechoslovakia) H Mandlíková | 6 | 6
(Socialist Federal Republic of Yugoslavia) S Goleš (Austria) P Huber | 1 | 1
(United States) C Benjamin (United States) F Raschiatore | 6 | 6
(United States) K Sands (France) C Vanier | 3 | 1

Quarterfinals
6 | (West Germany) C Kohde-Kilsch (Czechoslovakia) H Mandlíková | 6 | 4 | 6
(United States) C Benjamin (United States) F Raschiatore | 3 | 6 | 1
