= 1984 French Open – Women's singles =

Women's singles
- 1984 French Open

Final
- Champion: (United States) Martina Navratilova
- Runner-up: (United States) Chris Evert
- Score: 6–3, 6–1

Details
- Seeds: 16

Events
Singles	men	women		boys	girls
Doubles	men	women	mixed	boys	girls
WC Singles	men	women	quad
WC Doubles	men	women	quad
Legends	−45	45+	women
← 1983 ·	French Open	· 1985 →

Martina Navratilova defeated defending champion Chris Evert in the final, 6–3, 6–1 to win the women's singles tennis title at the 1984 French Open. It was her second French Open singles title and ninth major singles title overall. With the win, Navratilova completed a non-calendar-year Grand Slam, becoming the second woman in the Open Era to simultaneously hold all four major singles titles (after Margaret Court in 1970), and the first to do so on three different surfaces.

== Seeds ==
1. (United States) Martina Navratilova (champion)
2. (United States) Chris Evert (final)
3. (Czechoslovakia) Hana Mandlíková (semifinals)
4. (United States) Andrea Jaeger (first round)
5. (United States) Kathy Jordan (second round)
6. (United States) Zina Garrison (fourth round)
7. (United Kingdom) Jo Durie (second round)
8. (United States) Kathy Horvath (quarterfinals)
9. (Czechoslovakia) Helena Suková (first round)
10. (Bulgaria) Manuela Maleeva (fourth round)
11. (West Germany) Sylvia Hanika (third round)
12. (Hungary) Andrea Temesvári (second round)
13. (United States) Lisa Bonder (quarterfinals)
14. (West Germany) Claudia Kohde-Kilsch (fourth round)
15. (Canada) Carling Bassett (quarterfinals)
16. (Argentina) Ivanna Madruga-Osses (first round)

== Draw ==
=== Key ===
- Q = Qualifier
- WC = Wild card
- LL = Lucky loser
- Alt = Alternate
- ITF = ITF entry
- PR = Protected ranking
- SR = Special ranking
- SE = Special exempt
- JE = Junior exempt
- JR = Junior Accelerator Programme entrant
- CO = College Accelerator Programme entrant
- NG = Next Gen Accelerator Program entrant
- w/o = Walkover
- r = Retired
- d = Defaulted

=== Finals ===
Quarterfinals
1	(United States) Martina Navratilova	6	6
8	(United States) Kathy Horvath	4	2
3	(Czechoslovakia) Hana Mandlíková	6	6
(United States) Melissa Brown	1	4
13	(United States) Lisa Bonder	6^{3}	7	3
(United States) Camille Benjamin	7^{7}	5	6
15	(Canada) Carling Bassett	6	1	0
2	(United States) Chris Evert	4	6	6

Semifinals
1	(United States) Martina Navratilova	3	6	6
3	(Czechoslovakia) Hana Mandlíková	6	2	2
(United States) Camille Benjamin	0	0
2	(United States) Chris Evert	6	6

Final
1	(United States) Martina Navratilova	6	6
2	(United States) Chris Evert	3	1

=== Top half ===
==== Section 1 ====
First round
1	(United States) M Navratilova	6	6
WC	(France) N Tauziat	1	2
(Netherlands) M Mesker	6	6
(Czechoslovakia) K Skronská	2	3
(Italy) S Simmonds	6^{5}	6^{2}
(Sweden) C Lindqvist	7^{7}	7^{7}
WC	(France) M-C Calleja	7^{7}	6
(Australia) S Leo	6^{1}	4
(United States) S Solomon	4	7^{7}	6
(Hong Kong) P Hy	6	6^{5}	2
(Argentina) E Longo	2	6^{2}
(West Germany) S Graf	6	7^{7}
(France) C Suire	1	5
(France) S Amiach	6	7
Q	(Socialist Federal Republic of Yugoslavia) R Šašak	2	1
14	(West Germany) C Kohde-Kilsch	6	6

Second round
1	(United States) M Navratilova	6	6
(Netherlands) M Mesker	1	1
(Sweden) C Lindqvist	6	5	1
WC	(France) M-C Calleja	4	7	6
(United States) S Solomon	2	1
(West Germany) S Graf	6	6
(France) S Amiach	4	0
14	(West Germany) C Kohde-Kilsch	6	6

Third round
1	(United States) M Navratilova	6	6
WC	(France) M-C Calleja	1	3
(West Germany) S Graf	2	6	1
14	(West Germany) C Kohde-Kilsch	6	2	6

Fourth round
1	(United States) M Navratilova	6	6
14	(West Germany) C Kohde-Kilsch	0	1

==== Section 2 ====
First round
11	(West Germany) S Hanika	6	6
(United States) K Latham	1	0
(United States) P Teeguarden	6	6
(United States) F Raschiatore	1	2
(France) I Demongeot	6	6
(Australia) A Tobin	2	3
(Italy) F Bonsignori	2	5
(United States) A White	6	7
(United States) K Rinaldi	7	6
(United States) G Purdy	5	2
(France) N Herreman	0	6	6
(South Africa) R Mentz	6	2	3
(Australia) E Sayers	6	4	2
(Japan) E Inoue	4	6	6
WC	(France) N Phan-Thanh	2	2
8	(United States) K Horvath	6	6

Second round
11	(West Germany) S Hanika	1	6	6
(United States) P Teeguarden	6	0	3
(France) I Demongeot	4	3
(United States) A White	6	6
(United States) K Rinaldi	6	6
(France) N Herreman	4	0
(Japan) E Inoue	1	0
8	(United States) K Horvath	6	6

Third round
11	(West Germany) S Hanika	4	2
(United States) A White	6	6
(United States) K Rinaldi	0	3
8	(United States) K Horvath	6	6

Fourth round
(United States) A White	1	1
8	(United States) K Horvath	6	6

==== Section 3 ====
First round
3	(Czechoslovakia) H Mandlíková	6	6
LL	(Czechoslovakia) Y Brzáková	4	0
(United States) S Mascarin	6	6
(United States) L Antonoplis	1	3
(Japan) E Okagawa	5	7	1
(United States) L McNeil	7	5	6
(France) C Tanvier	6	7
(Romania) L Romanov	2	5
(Soviet Union) N Reva	6	6
(Italy) A-M Cecchini	3	4
(United States) B Nagelsen	3	4
Q	(Soviet Union) E Eliseenko	6	6
(United Kingdom) A Hobbs	4	6	6
(United Kingdom) R Einy	6	2	0
Q	(West Germany) P Keppeler	2	7	6
16	(Argentina) I Madruga-Osses	6	5	1

Second round
3	(Czechoslovakia) H Mandlíková	6	6
(United States) S Mascarin	2	4
(United States) L McNeil	4	2
(France) C Tanvier	6	6
(Soviet Union) N Reva	0	2
Q	(Soviet Union) E Eliseenko	6	6
(United Kingdom) A Hobbs	3	2
Q	(West Germany) P Keppeler	6	6

Third round
3	(Czechoslovakia) H Mandlíková	6	7
(France) C Tanvier	3	5
Q	(Soviet Union) E Eliseenko	1	4
Q	(West Germany) P Keppeler	6	6

Fourth round
3	(Czechoslovakia) H Mandlíková	6	4	6
Q	(West Germany) P Keppeler	0	6	1

==== Section 4 ====
First round
9	(Czechoslovakia) H Suková	6^{3}	6	3
(United States) M Torres	7^{7}	4	6
(South Africa) R Fairbank	6	6
(United Kingdom) S Barker	2	3
(United States) L Allen	3	7	1
(United States) W White	6	5	6
(United States) M Brown	4	6	6
WC	(France) H Cedet	6	3	4
(Italy) R Reggi	6	6
(United States) B Bramblett	0	2
(United States) G Kim	1	0
(United States) J Russell	6	6
(United States) B Jordan	4	3
(Switzerland) P Jauch-Delhees	6	6
(France) P Paradis	4	5
6	(United States) Z Garrison	6	7

Second round
(United States) M Torres	7^{7}	7^{7}
(South Africa) R Fairbank	6^{5}	6^{4}
(United States) W White	2	7^{7}	3
(United States) M Brown	6	6^{4}	6
(Italy) R Reggi	7^{7}	6
(United States) J Russell	6^{2}	1
(Switzerland) P Jauch-Delhees	4	6	2
6	(United States) Z Garrison	6	3	6

Third round
(United States) M Torres	6	5	2
(United States) M Brown	3	7	6
(Italy) R Reggi	5	4
6	(United States) Z Garrison	7	6

Fourth round
(United States) M Brown	6	3	6
6	(United States) Z Garrison	3	6	3

=== Bottom half ===
==== Section 5 ====
First round
5	(United States) K Jordan	7	4	13
(Australia) A Minter	5	6	11
(Romania) V Ruzici	3	6	6
(United Kingdom) V Wade	6	3	3
(Czechoslovakia) I Budařová	6	6
(United States) K Sands	3	2
(Denmark) T Scheuer-Larsen	7	6
Q	(Czechoslovakia) H Fukárková	5	2
(United States) P Smith	6	6
(South Africa) B Mould	2	4
(United States) T Mochizuki	7	6^{4}	1
(United States) A Holton	5	7^{7}	6
(United States) S Collins	2	7	4
(United States) V Nelson	6	5	6
(France) C Vanier	1	1
13	(United States) L Bonder	6	6

Second round
5	(United States) K Jordan	3	2
(Romania) V Ruzici	6	6
(Czechoslovakia) I Budařová	6	6
(Denmark) T Scheuer-Larsen	3	4
(United States) P Smith	5	2
(United States) A Holton	7	6
(United States) V Nelson	2	2
13	(United States) L Bonder	6	6

Third round
(Romania) V Ruzici	6	6
(Czechoslovakia) I Budařová	0	1
(United States) A Holton	4	1
13	(United States) L Bonder	6	6

Fourth round
(Romania) V Ruzici	4	3
13	(United States) L Bonder	6	6

==== Section 6 ====
First round
12	(Hungary) A Temesvári	6	6
(United States) J Mundel	2	1
(United States) T Phelps	6^{0}	4
(Socialist Federal Republic of Yugoslavia) S Goleš	7^{7}	6
Q	(Greece) A Kanellopoulou	5	4
(South Africa) R Uys	7	6
Q	(Sweden) C Karlsson	2	4
(West Germany) B Bunge	6	6
(Switzerland) C Jolissaint	6	1	3
(Czechoslovakia) M Skuherská	2	6	6
(United States) M Gurney	2	4
(Sweden) C Jexell	6	6
(United States) C Benjamin	6	4	6
(Brazil) C Monteiro	4	6	1
(United States) J Golder	7
4	(United States) A Jaeger	5	r

Second round
12	(Hungary) A Temesvári	5	4
(Socialist Federal Republic of Yugoslavia) S Goleš	7	6
(South Africa) R Uys	6	3	5
(West Germany) B Bunge	4	6	7
(Czechoslovakia) M Skuherská	2	3
(Sweden) C Jexell	6	6
(United States) C Benjamin	6	6
(United States) J Golder	2	2

Third round
(Socialist Federal Republic of Yugoslavia) S Goleš	6	1	6
(West Germany) B Bunge	3	6	3
(Sweden) C Jexell	1	1
(United States) C Benjamin	6	6

Fourth round
(Socialist Federal Republic of Yugoslavia) S Goleš	3	7	6
(United States) C Benjamin	6	5	8

==== Section 7 ====
First round
7	(United Kingdom) J Durie	6	6
(Switzerland) L Drescher	3	3
(Peru) L Arraya	6	4	9
(United Kingdom) A Croft	4	6	7
(Peru) P Vásquez	4	7^{7}	4
(West Germany) E Pfaff	6	6^{2}	6
WC	(France) I Vernhes	6	2	6
(United States) B Herr	3	6	2
(United States) K Steinmetz	1	2
(United States) J Klitch	6	6
WC	(France) F Duxin	7	5	6
(United States) K Keil	5	7	3
(Austria) P Huber	6	6
(United States) A Moulton	2	3
(United States) C Reynolds	0	0
15	(Canada) C Bassett	6	6

Second round
7	(United Kingdom) J Durie	2	7	4
(Peru) L Arraya	6	5	6
(West Germany) E Pfaff	6	3	6
WC	(France) I Vernhes	0	6	1
(United States) J Klitch	6	1	7
WC	(France) F Duxin	4	6	5
(Austria) P Huber	3	6	3
15	(Canada) C Bassett	6	2	6

Third round
(Peru) L Arraya	5	6	6
(West Germany) E Pfaff	7	2	2
(United States) J Klitch	6^{5}	3
15	(Canada) C Bassett	7^{7}	6

Fourth round
(Peru) L Arraya	4	0
15	(Canada) C Bassett	6	6

==== Section 8 ====
First round
10	(Bulgaria) M Maleeva	6	6
(United States) B Gerken	2	2
(South Africa) Y Vermaak	6	6
(United States) J Harrington	1	1
(United States) P Casale	2	4
(Socialist Federal Republic of Yugoslavia) M Jaušovec	6	6
(Brazil) P Medrado	6	7^{7}
(United States) K Shaefer	3	6^{5}
(West Germany) M Schropp	6	6
(United States) S Rehe	4	1
(United States) A Henricksson	1	2
Q	(Soviet Union) L Savchenko	6	6
(Japan) M Yanagi	6	6
(United States) M Van Nostrand	2	3
(West Germany) H Eisterlehner	0	1
2	(United States) C Evert	6	6

Second round
10	(Bulgaria) M Maleeva	6	6
(South Africa) Y Vermaak	2	1
(Socialist Federal Republic of Yugoslavia) M Jaušovec	6	6
(Brazil) P Medrado	4	4
(West Germany) M Schropp	4	6	3
Q	(Soviet Union) L Savchenko	6	4	6
(Japan) M Yanagi	0	0
2	(United States) C Evert	6	6

Third round
10	(Bulgaria) M Maleeva	6	6
(Socialist Federal Republic of Yugoslavia) M Jaušovec	1	3
Q	(Soviet Union) L Savchenko	2	6	2
2	(United States) C Evert	6	4	6

Fourth round
10	(Bulgaria) M Maleeva	6	3	2
2	(United States) C Evert	3	6	6

Preceded by 1983 Australian Open – Women's singles	Grand Slam women's singles	Succeeded by 1984 Wimbledon Championships – Women's singles
