= Shelley Solomon =

American tennis player

- Full name: Rochelle Solomon Heller
- Country (sports): United States
- Born: June 19, 1963 Washington, D.C., U.S.
- Died: October 7, 2014 (aged 51) Fort Lauderdale, Florida, U.S.
- Prize money: $60,181

Singles
- Career record: 10–8

Grand Slam singles results
- Australian Open: 1R (1983)
- French Open: 2R (1984)
- US Open: 2R (1983)

Doubles
- Career record: 0–3

Grand Slam doubles results
- French Open: 2R (1983, 1984)
- US Open: 1R (1982, 1983)

Rochelle "Shelley" Solomon (June 19, 1963 – October 7, 2014) was a professional tennis player from the United States.

== Biography ==
Born in Washington, D.C., she was the younger sister of tennis player Harold Solomon. From the age of 11 she lived in Florida, where her father Leonard operated a car‐rental business. She attended The University of California, Los Angeles (UCLA), and was a member of their 1981 national championship winning team, and graduated magna cum laude.

Solomon competed on the professional circuit in the 1980s. In 1982, her first year on tour, Solomon was runner-up to Lisa Bonder at the Borden Classic, held in Tokyo. She made her second WTA Tour final at the 1983 Japan Open Tennis Championships and was beaten by Etsuko Inoue. At the 1983 US Open she beat Pam Casale in the opening round and took 10th seed Zina Garrison to three sets in her second round loss. She also made the second round of the 1984 French Open, where she lost to a 14-year-old Steffi Graf.

A law graduate from Nova Southeastern University, from which she graduated magna cum laude, Solomon became a lawyer after her tennis career, admitted to the Florida Bar in 1992. She was an assistant state attorney for Broward County and then worked for a law firm in Coral Springs as a partner and of counsel. She had four children from her marriage to Bill Heller.

Solomon died in Fort Lauderdale in 2014 at the age of 51. She had fallen 15 stories from the roof of a condominium on Las Olas Boulevard. It was reported that she had jumped.

== WTA Tour finals ==
=== Singles (0–2) ===
Result	Date	Tournament	Tier	Surface	Opponent	Score
Loss	Oct 1982	Borden Classic, Japan	Category 1	Hard	(United States) Lisa Bonder	6–2, 0–6, 3–6
Loss	Oct 1983	Japan Open, Japan	Category 1	Hard	(Japan) Etsuko Inoue	2–6, 7–5, 1–6
