= 1984 French Open – Men's doubles =

Men's doubles
- 1984 French Open

Final
- Champion: (France) Henri Leconte (France) Yannick Noah
- Runner-up: (Czechoslovakia) Pavel Složil (Czechoslovakia) Tomáš Šmíd
- Score: 6–4, 2–6, 3–6, 6–3, 6–2

Details
- Draw: 64
- Seeds: 16

Events
Singles	men	women		boys	girls
Doubles	men	women	mixed	boys	girls
WC Singles	men	women	quad
WC Doubles	men	women	quad
Legends	−45	45+	women
- French Open

The men's doubles tournament at the 1984 French Open was held from 26 May until 10 June 1984 on the outdoor clay courts at the Stade Roland Garros in Paris, France. Henri Leconte and Yannick Noah won the title, defeating Pavel Složil and Tomáš Šmíd in the final.

== Seeds ==
1. (Australia) Mark Edmondson / (United States) Sherwood Stewart (quarterfinals)
2. (Sweden) Anders Järryd / (Sweden) Hans Simonsson (third round)
3. (United States) Peter Fleming / (United States) Ferdi Taygan (first round)
4. (South Africa) Kevin Curren / (United States) Steve Denton (quarterfinals)
5. (Australia) Pat Cash / (Australia) Paul McNamee (first round)
6. (Czechoslovakia) Pavel Složil / (Czechoslovakia) Tomáš Šmíd (final)
7. (Brazil) Carlos Kirmayr / (Brazil) Cássio Motta (second round)
8. (Switzerland) Heinz Günthardt / (Hungary) Balázs Taróczy (third round)
9. (South Africa) Bernard Mitton / (United States) Butch Walts (first round)
10. (Australia) John Alexander / (Australia) John Fitzgerald (second round)
11. (United States) Tony Giammalva / (United States) Steve Meister (second round)
12. (Czechoslovakia) Stanislav Birner / (United States) Van Winitsky (first round)
13. (United States) Mark Dickson / (Sweden) Jan Gunnarsson (first round)
14. (Sweden) Stefan Edberg / (United States) Brian Gottfried (quarterfinals)
15. (United States) Ken Flach / (United States) Robert Seguso (first round)
16. (Australia) David Graham / (Australia) Laurie Warder (third round)

== Draw ==
Key

- Q = Qualifier
- WC = Wild card
- LL = Lucky loser
- Alt = Alternate
- ITF = ITF entry
- PR = Protected ranking
- SR = Special ranking
- SE = Special exempt
- JE = Junior exempt
- JR = Junior Accelerator Programme entrant
- CO = College Accelerator Programme entrant
- NG = Next Gen Accelerator Program entrant
- w/o = Walkover
- r = Retired
- d = Defaulted

=== Finals ===
Quarterfinals
1	(Australia) Mark Edmondson (United States) Sherwood Stewart	6	3	5
(United States) Jimmy Arias (United States) Eric Korita	4	6	7
4	(South Africa) Kevin Curren (United States) Steve Denton	6	3	4
6	(Czechoslovakia) Pavel Složil (Czechoslovakia) Tomáš Šmíd	2	6	6
(France) Henri Leconte (France) Yannick Noah	7	6
(United States) Martin Davis (United States) Chris Dunk	5	4
14	(Sweden) Stefan Edberg (United States) Brian Gottfried	3	4
(United States) Eric Fromm (Israel) Shlomo Glickstein	6	6

Semifinals
(United States) Jimmy Arias (United States) Eric Korita	1	1	0
6	(Czechoslovakia) Pavel Složil (Czechoslovakia) Tomáš Šmíd	6	6	6
(France) Henri Leconte (France) Yannick Noah	3	7	6	5	6
(United States) Eric Fromm (Israel) Shlomo Glickstein	6	6	3	7	2

Final
6	(Czechoslovakia) Pavel Složil (Czechoslovakia) Tomáš Šmíd	4	6	6	3	2
(France) Henri Leconte (France) Yannick Noah	6	2	3	6	6

=== Top half ===
==== Section 1 ====
First round
1	(Australia) M Edmondson (United States) S Stewart	6	6
(France) T Benhabiles (France) T Tulasne	2	2
(United States) R Crowley (United States) R Evett	6	2
(Paraguay) F González (Uruguay) D Pérez	7	6
(United States) J Canter (South Africa) D Tarr	6	6
(West Germany) B Becker (Poland) W Fibak	3	1
(Argentina) JL Clerc (Romania) I Năstase	6	6
13	(United States) M Dickson (Sweden) J Gunnarsson	4	4
9	(South Africa) B Mitton (United States) B Walts	3	4
(United States) J Arias (United States) E Korita	6	6
(Chile) A Fillol (Chile) J Fillol	2	7	4
(United States) D Gitlin (West Germany) S Hermann	6	6	6
(Switzerland) M Günthardt (Hungary) Z Kuharszky	7	6
(Australia) C Miller (Chile) B Prajoux	6	2
(United Kingdom) J Feaver (South Africa) C van Rensburg	4	6	4
7	(Brazil) C Kirmayr (Brazil) C Motta	6	4	6

Second round
1	(Australia) M Edmondson (United States) S Stewart	6	7
(Paraguay) F González (Uruguay) D Pérez	1	5
(United States) J Canter (South Africa) D Tarr	3	1
(Argentina) JL Clerc (Romania) I Năstase	6	6
(United States) J Arias (United States) E Korita	7	6
(United States) D Gitlin (West Germany) S Hermann	6	4
(Switzerland) M Günthardt (Hungary) Z Kuharszky	6	6
7	(Brazil) C Kirmayr (Brazil) C Motta	2	4

Third round
1	(Australia) M Edmondson (United States) S Stewart	7	6	6
(Argentina) JL Clerc (Romania) I Năstase	6	7	3
(United States) J Arias (United States) E Korita	6	6
(Switzerland) M Günthardt (Hungary) Z Kuharszky	4	3

Quarterfinals
1	(Australia) M Edmondson (United States) S Stewart	6	3	5
(United States) J Arias (United States) E Korita	4	6	7

==== Section 2 ====
First round
4	(South Africa) K Curren (United States) S Denton	6	6
(South Africa) E Edwards (South Africa) D Visser	3	2
(Australia) C Fancutt (Czechoslovakia) J Navrátil	6	7
(Switzerland) J Hlasek (Netherlands) M Schapers	3	6
(United States) L Bourne (United States) C Hooper	6	3	4
(France) L Courteau (France) G Forget	1	6	6
(South Africa) B Levine (Netherlands) H van Boeckel	4	7	6
12	(Czechoslovakia) S Birner (United States) V Winitsky	6	6	4
16	(Australia) D Graham (Australia) L Warder	7	7
(United States) V Gerulaitis (United States) M Purcell	6	5
(Australia) M Kratzmann (Australia) S Youl	6	6
(Argentina) C Gattiker (Argentina) G Tiberti	2	1
(Australia) W Masur (New Zealand) C Lewis	4	6	6
(Italy) P Canè (Italy) S Colombo	6	2	1
(Australia) J Frawley (Australia) W Hampson	4	2
6	(Czechoslovakia) P Složil (Czechoslovakia) T Šmíd	6	6

Second round
4	(South Africa) K Curren (United States) S Denton	4	6	7
(Australia) C Fancutt (Czechoslovakia) J Navrátil	6	3	5
(France) L Courteau (France) G Forget	2	7	6
(South Africa) B Levine (Netherlands) H van Boeckel	6	6	3
16	(Australia) D Graham (Australia) L Warder	6	6
(Australia) M Kratzmann (Australia) S Youl	3	1
(Australia) W Masur (New Zealand) C Lewis	7	6
6	(Czechoslovakia) P Složil (Czechoslovakia) T Šmíd	6	3

Third round
4	(South Africa) K Curren (United States) S Denton	2	6	6
(France) L Courteau (France) G Forget	6	3	4
16	(Australia) D Graham (Australia) L Warder	6	1
6	(Czechoslovakia) P Složil (Czechoslovakia) T Šmíd	7	6

Quarterfinals
4	(South Africa) K Curren (United States) S Denton	6	4	6
6	(Czechoslovakia) P Složil (Czechoslovakia) T Šmíd	4	6	8

=== Bottom half ===
==== Section 3 ====
First round
8	(Switzerland) H Günthardt (Hungary) B Taróczy	6	6
(United States) B Gilbert (United States) M Mitchell	1	1
(United Kingdom) C Dowdeswell (United States) M Leach	2	6	6
(Spain) S Casal (Chile) P Rebolledo	6	3	1
(Spain) G Urpí (South Africa) T Viljoen	6	5
(France) H Leconte (France) Y Noah	7	7
(New Zealand) M Lewis (New Zealand) D Mustard	2	7	6
15	(United States) K Flach (United States) R Seguso	6	6	4
10	(Australia) J Alexander (Australia) J Fitzgerald	7	6
(Denmark) M Mortensen (Czechoslovakia) L Pimek	5	3
(United States) M Davis (United States) C Dunk	7	6
(France) J-L Haillet (France) G Moretton	5	2
(Australia) B Drewett (Australia) B Dyke	6	6
(Brazil) A Hocevar (Brazil) M Hocevar	4	2
(United States) B Cox (Australia) M Fancutt	7	6
3	(United States) P Fleming (United States) F Taygan	6	2

Second round
8	(Switzerland) H Günthardt (Hungary) B Taróczy	7	7
(United Kingdom) C Dowdeswell (United States) M Leach	5	6
(France) H Leconte (France) Y Noah	7	4	6
(New Zealand) M Lewis (New Zealand) D Mustard	6	6	4
10	(Australia) J Alexander (Australia) J Fitzgerald	5	6
(United States) M Davis (United States) C Dunk	7	7
(Australia) B Drewett (Australia) B Dyke	7	6
(United States) B Cox (Australia) M Fancutt	6	4

Third round
8	(Switzerland) H Günthardt (Hungary) B Taróczy	3	6	4
(France) H Leconte (France) Y Noah	6	4	6
(United States) M Davis (United States) C Dunk	6	6	6
3	(Australia) B Drewett (Australia) B Dyke	3	7	3

Quarterfinals
(France) H Leconte (France) Y Noah	7	6
3	(United States) M Davis (United States) C Dunk	5	4

==== Section 4 ====
First round
5	(Australia) P Cash (Australia) P McNamee	6	4	7
(United States) C Strode (United States) C Wittus	2	6	9
(Sweden) J Nyström (Sweden) S Simonsson	6	6
(United States) S Brawley (United States) M Vines	2	3
(United Kingdom) J Lloyd (United States) D Stockton	6	6
(United States) M Freeman (United States) D Pate	2	2
(Chile) H Gildemeister (Ecuador) A Gómez	3	3
14	(Sweden) S Edberg (United States) B Gottfried	6	6
11	(United States) T Giammalva (United States) S Meister	6	6
(Peru) P Arraya (Spain) E Sánchez	4	4
(Australia) P Johnston (Australia) G Whitecross	6	3	1
(United States) E Fromm (Israel) S Glickstein	1	6	6
(New Zealand) B Derlin (United Kingdom) J Smith	0	6	2
(France) D Bedel (France) P Portes	6	3	6
(Brazil) J Góes (Brazil) N Keller	0	1
2	(Sweden) A Järryd (Sweden) H Simonsson	6	6

Second round
(United States) C Strode (United States) C Wittus	7	6	9
(Sweden) J Nyström (Sweden) S Simonsson	6	7	7
(United Kingdom) J Lloyd (United States) D Stockton	3	6	3
14	(Sweden) S Edberg (United States) B Gottfried	6	2	6
11	(United States) T Giammalva (United States) S Meister	4	6	4
(United States) E Fromm (Israel) S Glickstein	6	1	6
(France) D Bedel (France) P Portes	2	4
2	(Sweden) A Järryd (Sweden) H Simonsson	6	6

Third round
(United States) C Strode (United States) C Wittus	5	7	3
14	(Sweden) S Edberg (United States) B Gottfried	7	6	6
(United States) E Fromm (Israel) S Glickstein	6	6
2	(Sweden) A Järryd (Sweden) H Simonsson	3	4

Quarterfinals
14	(Sweden) S Edberg (United States) B Gottfried	3	4
(United States) E Fromm (Israel) S Glickstein	6	6
