= Susan Rimes =

American tennis player

- Full name: Susan Rimes Seiler
- Country (sports): United States
- Born: 15 April 1959 (age 65)
- Prize money: $45,777

Singles
- Highest ranking: No. 179 (August 3, 1987)

Grand Slam singles results
- Australian Open: 2R (1987)
- Wimbledon: 1R (1983)

Doubles
- Highest ranking: No. 148 (December 21, 1986)

Grand Slam doubles results
- French Open: 2R (1984)
- Wimbledon: 1R (1984)
- US Open: 1R (1984)

Grand Slam mixed doubles results
- French Open: 1R (1984, 1986)

Susan Rimes Seiler (born April 15, 1959) is an American former professional tennis player.

== Biography ==
Raised in Fort Lauderdale, Rimes and her sisters were trained in ballet and tennis as children, with her older sister Tamara going on to dance professionally. It was in tennis that Rimes excelled and around the age of ten she was tutored by Chris Evert's father Jimmy.

Rimes, who attended Pine Crest School in Fort Lauderdale, played four years of college tennis for Clemson University.

From 1983 to 1987, Rimes competed on the professional tennis tour and reached a career high singles ranking of 179 in the world. During her career she played at all four grand slam tournaments, which included the 1983 Wimbledon Championships, where she was beaten in the first round by Andrea Jaeger, but took the third seed to a second set tiebreak.

Her husband is former Fort Lauderdale mayor Jack Seiler.
