= Melissa Brown (tennis) =

American tennis player

- Country (sports): United States
- Born: April 11, 1968 (age 57)
- Prize money: $38,798

Singles
- Career record: 63–73
- Career titles: 0
- Highest ranking: No. 45 (August 20, 1984)

Grand Slam singles results
- Australian Open: 3R (1988)
- French Open: QF (1984)
- Wimbledon: 2R (1984)
- US Open: 1R (1984)

Doubles
- Career record: 0–5
- Career titles: 0
- Highest ranking: No. 547 (August 15, 1988)

Melissa Brown (born April 11, 1968) is a former tennis player from the U.S. who was a quarterfinalist at the 1984 French Open. In this tournament, she defeated Hélène Cedet, Wendy White, Michelle Torres and Zina Garrison, then lost to Hana Mandlíková.
