= 1984 French Open – Men's singles =

Men's singles
- 1984 French Open

Final
- Champion: (Czechoslovakia) Ivan Lendl
- Runner-up: (United States) John McEnroe
- Score: 3–6, 2–6, 6–4, 7–5, 7–5

Details
- Draw: 128
- Seeds: 16

Events
Singles	men	women		boys	girls
Doubles	men	women	mixed	boys	girls
WC Singles	men	women	quad
WC Doubles	men	women	quad
Legends	−45	45+	women
- French Open

Ivan Lendl defeated John McEnroe in the final, 3–6, 2–6, 6–4, 7–5, 7–5 to win the men's singles tennis title at the 1984 French Open. It was his first major title, following four runner-up finishes. Lendl was the second man in the Open Era to win a major final from two sets down, after Björn Borg at the 1974 French Open. It was McEnroe's first defeat of the 1984 season, ending a 42-match winning streak: the best-ever unbeaten start to a season. This was also McEnroe's only final appearance at the clay courts of the French Open. The final is considered one of the greatest matches ever played.

Yannick Noah was the defending champion, but lost to Mats Wilander in the quarterfinals in a rematch of the previous year's final.

== Seeds ==
The seeded players are listed below. Ivan Lendl is the champion; others show the round in which they were eliminated.

1. (United States) John McEnroe (final)
2. (Czechoslovakia) Ivan Lendl (champion)
3. (United States) Jimmy Connors (semifinals)
4. (Sweden) Mats Wilander (semifinals)
5. (United States) Jimmy Arias (quarterfinals)
6. (France) Yannick Noah (quarterfinals)
7. (Ecuador) Andrés Gómez (quarterfinals)
8. (Argentina) José Luis Clerc (second round)
9. (Sweden) Henrik Sundström (quarterfinals)
10. (Argentina) Guillermo Vilas (first round)
11. (Sweden) Anders Järryd (fourth round)
12. (Spain) José Higueras (fourth round)
13. (Spain) Juan Aguilera (fourth round)
14. (Czechoslovakia) Tomáš Šmíd (second round)
15. (United States) Tim Mayotte (first round)
16. (New Zealand) Chris Lewis (first round)

== Draw ==
=== Key ===
- Q = Qualifier
- WC = Wild card
- LL = Lucky loser
- r = Retired

=== Finals ===
Quarterfinals
1	(United States) John McEnroe	6	6	6
5	(United States) Jimmy Arias	3	4	4
3	(United States) Jimmy Connors	7	6	6
9	(Sweden) Henrik Sundström	6	1	4
6	(France) Yannick Noah	6	6	6	3	3
4	(Sweden) Mats Wilander	7	2	3	6	6
7	(Ecuador) Andrés Gómez	3	7	4	3
2	(Czechoslovakia) Ivan Lendl	6	6	6	6

Semifinals
1	(United States) John McEnroe	7	6	6
3	(United States) Jimmy Connors	5	1	2
4	(Sweden) Mats Wilander	3	3	5
2	(Czechoslovakia) Ivan Lendl	6	6	7

Final
1	(United States) John McEnroe	6	6	4	5	5
2	(Czechoslovakia) Ivan Lendl	3	2	6	7	7

=== Section 1 ===
First round
1	(United States) J.McEnroe	6	6	6
Q	(Argentina) H.de la Peña	3	1	3
(United States) M.Davis	2	4	2
(United States) B.Testerman	6	6	6
(Spain) G.Urpí	4	6	6	7
(India) R.Krishnan	6	4	1	6
(Brazil) C.Kirmayr	3	6	2
(United States) M.Purcell	6	7	6
(United States) C.Hooper	4	6	6	6	2
(Brazil) C.Motta	6	7	4	4	6
(Switzerland) J.Hlasek	6	3	6	6
(Argentina) R.Argüello	2	6	1	2
Q	(United States) R.Seguso	7	0	7	7
(United States) T.Giammalva	5	6	5	5
(Romania) I.Năstase	3	0	3
12	(Spain) J.Higueras	6	6	6

Second round
1	(United States) J.McEnroe	6	6	6
(United States) B.Testerman	4	1	4
(Spain) G.Urpí	4	2	4
(United States) M.Purcell	6	6	6
(Brazil) C.Motta	6	7	7
(Switzerland) J.Hlasek	3	5	5
Q	(United States) R.Seguso	3	4	4
12	(Spain) J.Higueras	6	6	6

Third round
1	(United States) J.McEnroe	6	6	6
(United States) M.Purcell	4	4	1
(Brazil) C.Motta	7	6	1	2	1
12	(Spain) J.Higueras	5	3	6	6	6

Fourth round
1	(United States) J.McEnroe	6	7	3	6
12	(Spain) J.Higueras	4	6	6	3

=== Section 2 ===
First round
15	(United States) T.Mayotte	5	1	6
(West Germany) R.Gehring	7	6	7
(Spain) F.Luna	6	3	4	5
(France) T.Benhabiles	4	6	6	7
(United States) M.Leach	5	7	7	6
Q	(Brazil) J.Góes	7	6	5	4
(United States) V.Winitsky	1	0	2
(United States) B.Gottfried	6	6	6
(Italy) C.Barazzutti	6	4	6	6
(United States) S.Giammalva Jr.	0	6	3	0
(Chile) R.Acuña	2	3	3
(Italy) C.Panatta	6	6	6
(Italy) G.Ocleppo	4	6	2	6	6
(Brazil) J.Soares	6	3	6	3	4
Q	(France) D.Bedel	6	2	4
5	(United States) J.Arias	7	6	6

Second round
(West Germany) R.Gehring	6	4	6	6
(France) T.Benhabiles	3	6	1	4
(United States) M.Leach	6	3	4	0
(United States) B.Gottfried	2	6	6	6
(Italy) C.Barazzutti	6	2	r
(Italy) C.Panatta	7	4
(Italy) G.Ocleppo	5	2	2
5	(United States) J.Arias	7	6	6

Third round
(West Germany) R.Gehring	6	4	4
(United States) B.Gottfried	7	6	6
(Italy) C.Panatta	6	3	3
5	(United States) J.Arias	7	6	6

Fourth round
(United States) B.Gottfried	4	6	4	6	2
5	(United States) J.Arias	6	2	6	1	6

=== Section 3 ===
First round
3	(United States) J.Connors	6	6	6
(United States) E.Fromm	2	3	1
(United Kingdom) J.Lloyd	6	6	2	6
(United Kingdom) C.Dowdeswell	4	1	6	4
(United States) V.Gerulaitis	3	6	6	6	8
Q	(United States) L.Bourne	6	7	4	4	6
(Argentina) M.Jaite	2	6	6	6
(Spain) A.Tous	6	3	3	2
(United States) P.Fleming	3	6	1	3
Q	(France) L.Courteau	6	3	6	6
(Switzerland) R.Stadler	4	1	6	6	6
(South Africa) D.Tarr	6	6	4	3	3
(Brazil) M.Hocevar	6	3	5
(Spain) E.Sánchez	7	6	7
(Australia) B.Drewett	3	3	4
14	(Czechoslovakia) T.Šmid	6	6	6

Second round
3	(United States) J.Connors	6	6	6
(United Kingdom) J.Lloyd	4	1	4
(United States) V.Gerulaitis	3	6	4	3
(Argentina) M.Jaite	6	1	6	6
Q	(France) L.Courteau	0	3	6	5
(Switzerland) R.Stadler	6	6	3	7
(Spain) E.Sánchez	7	6	6
14	(Czechoslovakia) T.Šmid	6	4	4

Third round
3	(United States) J.Connors	4	6	6	6
(Argentina) M.Jaite	6	4	3	1
(Switzerland) R.Stadler	1	4	6
(Spain) E.Sánchez	6	6	7

Fourth round
3	(United States) J.Connors	6	6	6
(Spain) E.Sánchez	4	1	1

=== Section 4 ===
First round
9	(Sweden) H.Sundström	6	6	6
(Chile) A.Fillol	1	3	3
(Australia) J.Fitzgerald	6	0	6	6
(Sweden) J.Nyström	7	6	4	7
(Chile) H.Gildemeister	6	6	6
(Paraguay) V.Pecci Sr.	4	3	2
(United States) B.Gilbert	1	6	6	2	6
(Israel) S.Glickstein	6	4	1	6	2
(France) F.Errard	3	3	5
(Italy) F.Cancellotti	6	6	7
Q	(Socialist Federal Republic of Yugoslavia) S.Živojinović	6	7	6
(Uruguay) D.Pérez	3	6	4
(South Africa) D.Visser	3	7	0	3
Q	(Czechoslovakia) K.Nováček	6	5	6	6
(United States) M.Doyle	1	6	2
8	(Argentina) J. L. Clerc	6	7	6

Second round
9	(Sweden) H.Sundström	6	6	7
(Sweden) J.Nyström	2	2	6
(Chile) H.Gildemeister	6	6	6
(United States) B.Gilbert	1	2	4
(Italy) F.Cancellotti	6	6	2	6
Q	(Socialist Federal Republic of Yugoslavia) S.Živojinović	3	1	6	4
Q	(Czechoslovakia) K.Nováček	2	6	6	3	8
8	(Argentina) J. L.Clerc	6	2	3	6	6

Third round
9	(Sweden) H.Sundström	2	0	7	6	6
(Chile) H.Gildemeister	6	6	5	3	4
(Italy) F.Cancellotti	6	6	6
Q	(Czechoslovakia) K.Nováček	3	2	3

Fourth round
9	(Sweden) H.Sundström	7	6	6
(Italy) F.Cancellotti	5	1	2

=== Section 5 ===
First round
6	(France) Y.Noah	6	4	6	1	6
(United States) M.Dickson	4	6	2	6	1
(France) G.Forget	6	5	3
(Belgium) B.Boileau	7	7	6
(West Germany) H.Schwaier	7	6	6
(West Germany) A.Maurer	5	1	1
(Socialist Federal Republic of Yugoslavia) M.Ostoja	5	4	0
(Australia) J.Frawley	7	6	6
(Poland) W.Fibak	6	4	6	3	6
(West Germany) H-D. Beutel	2	6	1	6	4
(United States) A.Krickstein	6	6	6
Q	(Brazil) E.Oncins	0	1	1
(United States) D.Pate	4	5	1
Q	(United States) B.Manson	6	7	6
(Hungary) B.Taróczy	6	6	6
16	(New Zealand) C.Lewis	3	2	4

Second round
6	(France) Y.Noah	6	6	6
(Belgium) B.Boileau	4	4	4
(West Germany) H.Schwaier	1	6	3	7	6
(Australia) J.Frawley	6	4	6	6	8
(Poland) W.Fibak	6	2	6	7	10
(United States) A.Krickstein	3	6	7	5	8
Q	(United States) B.Manson	3	1	0
(Hungary) B.Taróczy	6	6	6

Third round
6	(France) Y.Noah	6	6	6
(Australia) J.Frawley	1	4	3
(Poland) W.Fibak	6	6	3	2	4
(Hungary) B.Taróczy	2	4	6	6	6

Fourth round
6	(France) Y.Noah	3	6	7	7
(Hungary) B.Taróczy	6	2	6	6

=== Section 6 ===
First round
13	(Spain) J.Aguilera	1	4	6	7	6
(Czechoslovakia) M.Mečíř	6	6	3	6	1
Q	(Australia) M.Kratzmann	4	0	3
(Czechoslovakia) P.Složil	6	6	6
(France) C.Roger-Vasselin	0	6	2	7	3
(United States) H.Solomon	6	4	6	5	6
Q	(Argentina) C.Castellan	6	0	6	6
Q	(Australia) S.Youl	2	6	1	3
(Spain) J.Avendaño	6	4	1	2
(Czechoslovakia) L.Pimek	3	6	6	6
(Australia) P.Cash	3	4	3
(France) T.Tulasne	6	6	6
(Australia) J.Alexander	6	6	6
(Chile) P.Rebolledo	3	4	2
(Australia) W.Masur	3	2	3
4	(Sweden) M.Wilander	6	6	6

Second round
13	(Spain) J.Aguilera	7	6	6
(Czechoslovakia) P.Složil	5	1	1
(United States) H.Solomon	4	6	6	7
Q	(Argentina) C.Castellan	6	4	0	5
(Czechoslovakia) L.Pimek	3	3	1
(France) T.Tulasne	6	6	6
(Australia) J.Alexander	4	1	3
4	(Sweden) M.Wilander	6	6	6

Third round
13	(Spain) J.Aguilera	6	6	6
(United States) H.Solomon	3	7	2
(France) T.Tulasne	2	2	4
4	(Sweden) M.Wilander	6	6	6

Fourth round
13	(Spain) J.Aguilera	2	1	3
4	(Sweden) M.Wilander	6	6	6

=== Section 7 ===
First round
7	(Ecuador) A.Gómez	6	6	6
(South Africa) B.Mitton	3	3	4
(United States) M.Freeman	6	4	6	6
(United States) S.Denton	4	6	4	4
(Romania) F.Segărceanu	6	7	4	4	4
(France) P.Portes	1	6	6	6	6
(France) G.Goven	0	2	0
Q	(Sweden) K.Carlsson	6	6	6
(West Germany) M.Westphal	4	7	6	6
Q	(Iran) M.Bahrami	6	6	3	4
(Canada) G.Michibata	1	1	1
(Sweden) J.Gunnarsson	6	6	6
(United States) J.Brown	6	6	6
(Sweden) S.Simonsson	4	3	2
(Switzerland) H.Günthardt	4	6	7	7
10	(Argentina) G.Vilas	6	4	6	6

Second round
7	(Ecuador) A.Gómez	7	6	6
(United States) M.Freeman	5	2	3
(France) P.Portes	1	3	6	6	4
Q	(Sweden) K.Carlsson	6	6	3	4	6
(West Germany) M.Westphal	4	6	4	4
(Sweden) J.Gunnarsson	6	0	6	6
(United States) J.Brown	6	6	0	1
(Switzerland) H.Günthardt	7	4	6	6

Third round
7	(Ecuador) A.Gómez	7	7	6
Q	(Sweden) K.Carlsson	6	5	3
(Sweden) J.Gunnarsson	3	7	6	3	6
(Switzerland) H.Günthardt	6	6	1	6	1

Fourth round
7	(Ecuador) A.Gómez	6	6	6
(Sweden) J.Gunnarsson	3	1	3

=== Section 8 ===
First round
11	(Sweden) A.Järryd	6	6	6
(France) J.Vanier	4	2	3
(Peru) P.Arraya	2	1	2
(Sweden) S.Edberg	6	6	6
(Netherlands) M.Schapers	6	6	5	6
(United States) E.Korita	2	2	7	1
(United States) S.Meister	2	1	3
Q	(Czechoslovakia) M.Vajda	6	6	6
Q	(Argentina) G.Guerrero	2	4	2
(Australia) P.McNamee	6	6	6
(France) H.Leconte	6	6	6
(Brazil) G.Barbosa	2	2	4
(Bolivia) M.Martinez	6	6	6
(Spain) S.Casal	0	3	2
(United States) M.Mitchell	3	2	0
2	(Czechoslovakia) I.Lendl	6	6	6

Second round
11	(Sweden) A.Järryd	6	3	7	7
(Sweden) S.Edberg	4	6	6	6
(Netherlands) M.Schapers	6	6	6	6
Q	(Czechoslovakia) M.Vajda	3	1	7	4
(Australia) P.McNamee	7	6	2	6
(France) H.Leconte	5	1	6	3
(Bolivia) M.Martinez	1	0	1
2	(Czechoslovakia) I.Lendl	6	6	6

Third round
11	(Sweden) A.Järryd	6	6	6
(Netherlands) M.Schapers	2	0	0
(Australia) P.McNamee	1	5	4
2	(Czechoslovakia) I.Lendl	6	7	6

Fourth round
11	(Sweden) A.Järryd	4	0	4
2	(Czechoslovakia) I.Lendl	6	6	6

Preceded by 1983 Australian Open – Men's singles	Grand Slam men's singles	Succeeded by 1984 Wimbledon Championships – Men's singles
