= François Errard =

French tennis player

- Country (sports): France
- Born: 10 September 1967 (age 57); Charleville, France
- Height: 5 ft 11 in (180 cm)
- Plays: Right-handed

Singles
- Career record: 0–2
- Highest ranking: No. 531 (23 March 1987)

Grand Slam singles results
- French Open: 1R (1983, 1984)

Doubles
- Career record: 5–6
- Highest ranking: No. 229 (10 July 1989)

Grand Slam doubles results
- French Open: 1R (1986)

Grand Slam mixed doubles results
- French Open: 2R (1986)

François Errard (born 10 September 1967) is a French former professional tennis player.

A right-handed player, Errard was only 15 when he made his French Open main draw debut in 1983.

Errard reached a career high singles ranking of 531 in the world. He played in the occasional Grand Prix main draw as a doubles player and made two semi-finals.
