= 1984 French Open =

- Date: 28 May – 10 June 1984
- Edition: 83
- Category: 54th Grand Slam (ITF)
- Draw: 128S / 64D / 64X
- Surface: Clay / outdoor
- Location: Paris (XVI^{e}), France
- Venue: Stade Roland Garros

Champions

Men's singles
- (Czechoslovakia) Ivan Lendl

Women's singles
- (United States) Martina Navratilova

Men's doubles
- (France) Henri Leconte / (France) Yannick Noah

Women's doubles
- (United States) Martina Navratilova / (United States) Pam Shriver

Mixed doubles
- (United States) Anne Smith / (United States) Dick Stockton
- French Open

The 1984 French Open was a tennis tournament that took place on the outdoor clay courts at the Stade Roland Garros in Paris, France. The tournament was held from 28 May until 10 June. It was the 83rd staging of the French Open, and the first Grand Slam tennis event of 1984.

The event was part of the 1984 Volvo Grand Prix and 1984 Virginia Slims World Championship Series.

== Finals ==
=== Men's singles ===
(Czechoslovakia) Ivan Lendl defeated (United States) John McEnroe, 3–6, 2–6, 6–4, 7–5, 7–5

- It was Lendl's first career Grand Slam title.

=== Women's singles ===
(United States) Martina Navratilova defeated (United States) Chris Evert, 6–3, 6–1

- It was Navratilova's ninth career Grand Slam title, and her second (and last) French Open title.

=== Men's doubles ===
(France) Henri Leconte / (France) Yannick Noah defeated (Czechoslovakia) Pavel Složil / (Czechoslovakia) Tomáš Šmíd, 6–4, 2–6, 3–6, 6–3, 6–2

=== Women's doubles ===
(United States) Martina Navratilova / (United States) Pam Shriver defeated (West Germany) Claudia Kohde-Kilsch / (Czechoslovakia) Hana Mandlíková, 5–7, 6–3, 6–2

=== Mixed doubles ===
(United States) Anne Smith / (United States) Dick Stockton defeated (Australia) Anne Minter / (Australia) Laurie Warder, 6–2, 6–4

== Prize money ==
| Event | | W | F | SF | QF | 4R | 3R | 2R | 1R |
| Singles | Men | FF1,058,600 | FF529,300 | FF264,700 | FF134,150 | FF77,650 | FF42,350 | FF24,700 | FF11,900 |
| Singles | Women | FF791,600 | FF422,250 | FF211,130 | FF108,750 | FF57,830 | FF29,000 | FF14,000 | FF7,360 |

Total prize money for the event was FF14,887,600.

| Preceded by 1983 Australian Open | Grand Slams | Succeeded by 1984 Wimbledon Championships |
