= 1985 Australian Open – Women's singles qualifying =

Women's singles qualifying
- 1985 Australian Open

Events
Singles	men	women		boys	girls
Doubles	men	women	mixed	boys	girls
WC Singles	men	women	quad
WC Doubles	men	women	quad
Legends	men	women	mixed

Qualification
Singles	men	women
- Australian Open

This article displays the qualifying draw for women's singles at the 1985 Australian Open.

== Seeds ==
1. (West Germany) Andrea Betzner (qualifying competition)
2. (France) Catherine Suire (qualified)
3. (Czechoslovakia) Kateřina Skronská (qualified)
4. (Sweden) Maria Lindström (first round)
5. (Canada) Jane Young (qualifying competition)
6. (Japan) Masako Yanagi (qualified)
7. (Sweden) Karolina Karlsson (first round)
8. (United States) Heather Ludloff (qualifying competition)

== Qualifiers ==
1. (Australia) Amanda Tobin
2. (Japan) Masako Yanagi
3. (Czechoslovakia) Kateřina Skronská
4. (Australia) Susan Leo
5. (United States) Beth Norton
6. (United States) Deeann Hansel
7. (Australia) Rebecca Bryant
8. (France) Catherine Suire

== Qualifying draw ==
Key

- Q = Qualifier
- WC = Wild card
- LL = Lucky loser
- Alt = Alternate
- ITF = ITF entry
- PR = Protected ranking
- SR = Special ranking
- SE = Special exempt
- JE = Junior exempt
- JR = Junior Accelerator Programme entrant
- CO = College Accelerator Programme entrant
- NG = Next Gen Accelerator Program entrant
- w/o = Walkover
- r = Retired
- d = Defaulted

=== First qualifier ===
First round
1	(West Germany) Andrea Betzner	3	6	8
(New Zealand) Julie Richardson	6	3	6
(United States) Anna-Maria Fernandez	6^{5}	6	1
(Australia) Amanda Tobin	7^{7}	4	6

Qualifying competition
1	(West Germany) Andrea Betzner	1	0
(Australia) Amanda Tobin	6	6

=== Second qualifier ===
First round
(Australia) Michelle Turk	6	6
(United Kingdom) Jo Louis	3	2
(Australia) Michelle Jaggard-Lai	4	2
6	(Japan) Masako Yanagi	6	6

Qualifying competition
(Australia) Michelle Turk	4	4
6	(Japan) Masako Yanagi	6	6

=== Third qualifier ===
First round
3	(Czechoslovakia) Kateřina Skronská	3	7	6
(Australia) Vicki Marler	6	5	0
(Australia) Brenda Catton	4	2
(United States) Paula Smith	6	6

Qualifying competition
3	(Czechoslovakia) Kateřina Skronská	6	6
(United States) Paula Smith	3	3

=== Fourth qualifier ===
First round
(Australia) Annette Gulley	2	0
(Australia) Susan Leo	6	6
(Czechoslovakia) Lea Plchová	6	4	4
8	(United States) Heather Ludloff	2	6	6

Qualifying competition
(Australia) Susan Leo	6	1	6
8	(United States) Heather Ludloff	3	6	3

=== Fifth qualifier ===
First round
5	(Canada) Jane Young	3	6	6
(United States) Caryn Copeland	6	3	3
(United Kingdom) Julie Salmon	4	0
(United States) Beth Norton	6	6

Qualifying competition
5	(Canada) Jane Young	3	2
(United States) Beth Norton	6	6

=== Sixth qualifier ===
First round
(Japan) Emiko Okagawa	6	6
(Australia) Kirsty Wenzel	4	2
(United States) Deeann Hansel	6	7^{7}
4	(Sweden) Maria Lindström	1	6^{3}

Qualifying competition
(Japan) Emiko Okagawa	6^{6}	4
(United States) Deeann Hansel	7^{8}	6

=== Seventh qualifier ===
First round
7	(Sweden) Karolina Karlsson	6^{5}	1
(United States) Susan Rimes	7^{7}	6
(Australia) Rebecca Bryant	4	6	6
(United States) Heather Crowe	6	1	4

Qualifying competition
(United States) Susan Rimes	5	1
(Australia) Rebecca Bryant	7	6

=== Eighth qualifier ===
First round
(Australia) Colleen Carney	4	4
(Australia) Pam Whytcross	6	6
(United States) Kim Steinmetz	5	7^{7}	2
2	(France) Catherine Suire	7	6^{2}	6

Qualifying competition
(Australia) Pam Whytcross	2	1
2	(France) Catherine Suire	6	6
