= 1987 Nutri-Metics Open – Singles =

Singles
- 1987 Nutri-Metics Open

Final
- Champion: (United States) Gretchen Magers
- Runner-up: (United States) Terry Phelps
- Score: 6–2, 6–3

Details
- Draw: 56
- Seeds: 8

Events
Singles	Doubles
← 1985 ·	WTA Auckland Open	· 1988 →

Anne Hobbs was the defending champion, but did not compete this year.

Gretchen Magers won the title by defeating Terry Phelps 6–2, 6–3 in the final.

== Seeds ==
All seeds received a bye into the second round.

1. (United States) Terry Phelps (final)
2. (United States) Gretchen Magers (champion)
3. (United States) Barbara Gerken (second round)
4. (Australia) Elizabeth Minter (semifinals)
5. (United States) Vicki Nelson-Dunbar (second round)
6. (United States) Anna-Maria Fernandez (quarterfinals)
7. (Australia) Nicole Provis (quarterfinals)
8. (Czechoslovakia) Andrea Holíková (third round)

== Draw ==
=== Key ===
- Q = Qualifier
- WC = Wild card
- LL = Lucky loser
- Alt = Alternate
- SE = Special exempt
- PR = Protected ranking
- ITF = ITF entry
- JE = Junior exempt
- w/o = Walkover
- r = Retired
- d = Defaulted
- SR = Special ranking

=== Finals ===
Quarterfinals
1	(United States) Terry Phelps	6	6
6	(United States) Anna-Maria Fernandez	4	3
4	(Australia) Elizabeth Minter	7	4	7
(Australia) Michelle Jaggard	5	6	6
(Belgium) Ann Devries	4	6	1
(United States) Kathrin Keil	6	2	6
7	(Australia) Nicole Provis	0	1
2	(United States) Gretchen Magers	6	6

Semifinals
1	(United States) Terry Phelps	6	7
4	(Australia) Elizabeth Minter	1	5
(United States) Kathrin Keil	6	1
2	(United States) Gretchen Magers	7	6

Final
1	(United States) Terry Phelps	2	3
2	(United States) Gretchen Magers	6	6

=== Top half ===
==== Section 1 ====
First round
(New Zealand) Tracey King	0	1
(United Kingdom) J Salmon	6	6
(New Zealand) B Cordwell	6	6
(New Zealand) Amanda Tate	2	1
(New Zealand) C Toleafoa	3	0
(Australia) S Faulkner	6	6
(Netherlands) M van der Torre	3	6	5
(New Zealand) J Richardson	6	1	7
(United States) Cy MacGregor	6	6
(Japan) A Nishiya	1	4
(Australia) R Bryant	6	5	7
(New Zealand) Elizabeth Daly	4	7	6

Second round
1	(United States) T Phelps	6	6
(United Kingdom) J Salmon	0	2
(New Zealand) B Cordwell	4	4
(Australia) S Faulkner	6	6
(New Zealand) J Richardson	6	6
(United States) Cy MacGregor	3	3
(Australia) R Bryant	2	3
6	(United States) AM Fernandez	6	6

Third round
1	(United States) T Phelps	6	6
(Australia) S Faulkner	0	3
(New Zealand) J Richardson	4	1
6	(United States) AM Fernandez	6	6

Quarterfinals
1	(United States) T Phelps	6	6
6	(United States) AM Fernandez	4	3

==== Section 2 ====
First round
(Australia) M Turk	6	3	4
(Australia) C Carney	2	6	6
(United States) J Golder	6	6
(United States) Jan Blackstad	0	0
(United States) P Jung	3	7	6
(Austria) H Sprung	6	5	3
(Australia) M Jaggard	6	6
(Austria) B Reinstadler	1	3
(Australia) A Scott	6	6
(Australia) Annette Smith	0	2
(Hong Kong) P Moreno	0	6	6
(United States) L Antonoplis	6	4	2

Second round
4	(Australia) E Minter	6	6	6
(Australia) C Carney	2	7	4
(United States) J Golder	6	6
(United States) P Jung	3	2
(Australia) M Jaggard	6	6
(Australia) A Scott	2	1
(Hong Kong) P Moreno	5	2
8	(Czechoslovakia) A Holíková	7	6

Third round
4	(Australia) E Minter	6	6
(United States) J Golder	1	0
(Australia) M Jaggard	6	6
8	(Czechoslovakia) A Holíková	1	3

Quarterfinals
4	(Australia) E Minter	7	4	7
(Australia) M Jaggard	5	6	6

=== Bottom half ===
==== Section 3 ====
First round
(Australia) M Bowrey	4	4
(Belgium) A Devries	6	6
(United States) Mary Dailey	6	6
(Australia) Annette Patchen	0	2
(Australia) Justine Brown	1	1
(United States) S Norris	6	6
(Japan) Y Koizumi	6	6
(New Zealand) M Parun	0	1
(Australia) L Field	6	6	6
(United States) S Rimes	7	4	2
(United States) J Newman	1	4
(United States) K Keil	6	6

Second round
5	(United States) V Nelson-Dunbar	6	2	5
(Belgium) A Devries	1	6	7
(United States) Mary Dailey	1	4
(United States) S Norris	6	6
(Japan) Y Koizumi	4	6
(Australia) L Field	6	7
(United States) K Keil	2	7	6
3	(United States) B Gerken	6	6	0

Third round
(Belgium) A Devries	7	6
(United States) S Norris	5	3
(Australia) L Field	3	2
(United States) K Keil	6	6

Quarterfinals
(Belgium) A Devries	4	6	1
(United States) K Keil	6	2	6

==== Section 4 ====
First round
(United Kingdom) J Tacon	2	4
(New Zealand) B Perry	6	6
(United States) P Smith	6	6
(Australia) Sharon McNamara	2	2
(United States) Lisa Fleming	2	5
(Australia) A Tobin-Dingwall	6	7
(United States) Sylvia Schenck	6	4	0
(Peru) P Vásquez	4	6	6
(Australia) L O'Neill	6	6
(United States) G Falkenberg	2	2
(Netherlands) C Bakuum	6	6	3
(New Zealand) R Seeman	2	7	6

Second round
7	(Australia) N Provis	6	6
(New Zealand) B Perry	2	2
(United States) P Smith	1	4
(Australia) A Tobin-Dingwall	6	6
(Peru) P Vásquez	7	6
(Australia) L O'Neill	5	0
(New Zealand) R Seeman	2	2
2	(United States) G Magers	6	6

Third round
7	(Australia) N Provis	4	6	6
(Australia) A Tobin-Dingwall	6	3	3
(Peru) P Vásquez	2	4
2	(United States) G Magers	6	6

Quarterfinals
7	(Australia) N Provis	0	1
2	(United States) G Magers	6	6
