= 1987 Nutri-Metics Open – Doubles =

Doubles
- 1987 Nutri-Metics Open

Final
- Champions: (United States) Anna-Maria Fernandez (New Zealand) Julie Richardson
- Runners-up: (United States) Gretchen Magers (Australia) Elizabeth Minter
- Score: 4–6, 6–4, 6–2

Details
- Draw: 24
- Seeds: 6

Events
Singles	Doubles
← 1985 ·	WTA Auckland Open	· 1988 →

Anne Hobbs and Candy Reynolds were the defending champions, but none competed this year. Reynolds chose to compete at Tokyo during the same week, losing at the quarterfinals.

Anna-Maria Fernandez and Julie Richardson won the title by defeating Gretchen Magers and Elizabeth Minter 4–6, 6–4, 6–2 in the final.

== Seeds ==
All seeds received a bye into the second round.

1. (United States) Barbara Gerken / (United States) Terry Phelps (quarterfinals)
2. (United States) Cammy MacGregor / (United States) Paula Smith (quarterfinals)
3. (United States) Anna-Maria Fernandez / (New Zealand) Julie Richardson (champions)
4. (United States) Gretchen Magers / (Australia) Elizabeth Minter (final)
5. (Australia) Belinda Cordwell / (Australia) Louise Field (semifinals)
6. (Netherlands) Carin Bakkum / (Netherlands) Marianne van der Torre (semifinals)

== Draw ==
=== Key ===
- Q = Qualifier
- WC = Wild card
- LL = Lucky loser
- Alt = Alternate
- SE = Special exempt
- PR = Protected ranking
- ITF = ITF entry
- JE = Junior exempt
- w/o = Walkover
- r = Retired
- d = Defaulted
- SR = Special ranking

=== Finals ===
Semifinals
5	(New Zealand) Belinda Cordwell (Australia) Louise Field	3	6	3
4	(United States) Gretchen Magers (Australia) Elizabeth Minter	6	4	6
3	(United States) Anna-Maria Fernandez (New Zealand) Julie Richardson	7	6
6	(Netherlands) Carin Bakkum (Netherlands) Marianne van der Torre	6	4

Final
4	(United States) Gretchen Magers (Australia) Elizabeth Minter	6	4	2
3	(United States) Anna-Maria Fernandez (New Zealand) Julie Richardson	4	6	6

=== Top half ===
First round
(Japan) Y Koizumi (Australia) Sharon McNamara	1	0
(United States) L Antonoplis (United States) Mary Dailey	6	6
(Australia) R Bryant (Australia) A Tobin-Dingwall	6	6
(United States) K Keil (Peru) P Vásquez	3	4
(Belgium) A Devries (Australia) N Provis	6	7
(Australia) M Jaggard (Australia) L O'Neill	2	6
(New Zealand) Elizabeth Daly (New Zealand) R Seeman	6	5	6
(Hong Kong) P Moreno (Austria) H Sprung	3	7	3

Second round
1	(United States) B Gerken (United States) T Phelps	7	6
(United States) L Antonoplis (United States) Mary Dailey	6	3
(United States) J Golder (United States) V Nelson-Dunbar	0	1
5	(New Zealand) B Cordwell (Australia) L Field	6	6
4	(United States) G Magers (Australia) E Minter	3	6	6
(Australia) R Bryant (Australia) A Tobin-Dingwall	6	1	4
(Belgium) A Devries (Australia) N Provis	6	7
(New Zealand) Elizabeth Daly (New Zealand) R Seeman	3	6

Quarterfinals
1	(United States) B Gerken (United States) T Phelps	6	4
5	(New Zealand) B Cordwell (Australia) L Field	7	6
4	(United States) G Magers (Australia) E Minter	6	6
(Belgium) A Devries (Australia) N Provis	4	2

Semifinals
5	(New Zealand) B Cordwell (Australia) L Field	3	6	3
4	(United States) G Magers (Australia) E Minter	6	4	6

=== Bottom half ===
First round
(United States) Jan Blackstad (United States) J Newman	4	4
(United Kingdom) J Salmon (United Kingdom) J Tacon	6	6
(United States) P Jung (United States) Sylvia Schenck	6	2	2
(Japan) A Nishiya (United States) S Norris	2	6	6
(United States) G Falkenberg (Australia) Annette Smith	0	1
(Australia) Justine Brown (Australia) L Pleming	6	6
(New Zealand) C Toleafoa (New Zealand) Amanda Trail	2	6	6
(Australia) M Bowrey (New Zealand) B Perry	6	2	2

Second round
(Australia) A Scott (Australia) M Turk	4	5
(United Kingdom) J Salmon (United Kingdom) J Tacon	6	7
(Japan) A Nishiya (United States) S Norris	2	6	3
3	(United States) AM Fernandez (New Zealand) J Richardson	6	4	6
6	(Netherlands) C Bakkum (Netherlands) M van der Torre	6	6
(Australia) Justine Brown (Australia) L Pleming	2	0
(New Zealand) C Toleafoa (New Zealand) Amanda Trail	6	1	2
2	(United States) Ca MacGregor (United States) P Smith	4	6	6

Quarterfinals
(United Kingdom) J Salmon (United Kingdom) J Tacon	6	4	0
3	(United States) AM Fernandez (New Zealand) J Richardson	4	6	6
6	(Netherlands) C Bakkum (Netherlands) M van der Torre	7	7
2	(United States) Ca MacGregor (United States) P Smith	6	5

Semifinals
3	(United States) AM Fernandez (New Zealand) J Richardson	7	6
6	(Netherlands) C Bakkum (Netherlands) M van der Torre	6	4
