= 1985 Australian Open – Men's singles qualifying =

Men's singles qualifying
- 1985 Australian Open

Events
Singles	men	women		boys	girls
Doubles	men	women	mixed	boys	girls
WC Singles	men	women	quad
WC Doubles	men	women	quad
Legends	men	women	mixed

Qualification
Singles	men	women
- Australian Open

This article displays the qualifying draw for men's singles at the 1985 Australian Open.

== Seeds ==
1. (Sweden) Peter Carlsson (first round)
2. (Australia) Broderick Dyke (qualified)
3. (United States) Tom Cain (qualified)
4. (South Africa) Eddie Edwards (qualifying competition, lucky loser)
5. (Soviet Union) Andrei Chesnokov (qualifying competition, lucky loser)
6. (South Africa) Michael Robertson (second round)
7. (United States) Todd Nelson (qualified)
8. (South Africa) Gary Muller (qualified)
9. (United States) Brett Dickinson (second round)
10. (New Zealand) Bruce Derlin (qualified)
11. (United States) Tomm Warneke (second round)
12. (Australia) Carl Limberger (qualifying competition, lucky loser)
13. (United Kingdom) Stuart Bale (qualified)
14. (New Zealand) David Mustard (qualifying competition, lucky loser)
15. (France) Thierry Champion (qualifying competition)
16. (Australia) Craig A. Miller (qualified)
17. (Canada) Hatem McDadi (second round)
18. (Australia) Mark Kratzmann (qualifying competition)
19. (United States) Marcel Freeman (qualified)
20. (Nigeria) Tony Mmoh (first round)
21. (United States) Scott McCain (first round)
22. (France) Éric Winogradsky (second round)
23. (Australia) Peter Carter (first round)
24. (United States) Steve Denton (qualified)

== Qualifiers ==
1. (Soviet Union) Alexander Zverev Sr.
2. (Australia) Broderick Dyke
3. (United States) Tom Cain
4. (Australia) Craig A. Miller
5. (United Kingdom) Stuart Bale
6. (Australia) Laurie Warder
7. (United States) Todd Nelson
8. (South Africa) Gary Muller
9. (United States) Steve Denton
10. (New Zealand) Bruce Derlin
11. (Australia) Roger Rasheed
12. (United States) Marcel Freeman

== Lucky losers ==
1. (Australia) Carl Limberger
2. (New Zealand) David Mustard
3. (Soviet Union) Andrei Chesnokov
4. (South Africa) Eddie Edwards

== Qualifying draw ==
Key

- Q = Qualifier
- WC = Wild card
- LL = Lucky loser
- Alt = Alternate
- ITF = ITF entry
- PR = Protected ranking
- SR = Special ranking
- SE = Special exempt
- JE = Junior exempt
- JR = Junior Accelerator Programme entrant
- CO = College Accelerator Programme entrant
- NG = Next Gen Accelerator Program entrant
- w/o = Walkover
- r = Retired
- d = Defaulted

=== First qualifier ===
First round
1	(Sweden) Peter Carlsson	3	2
(Australia) John Stoddart	6	6
(Australia) Paul Mick	2	6	6
(Australia) Sean Karam	6	3	8
(New Zealand) David Lewis	6	6	8
21	(United States) Scott McCain	3	7	6

Second round
(Australia) John Stoddart	7	6	3
(Soviet Union) Alexander Zverev Sr.	6	7	6
(Australia) Sean Karam	4	3^{r}
(New Zealand) David Lewis	6	4

Qualifying competition
(Soviet Union) Alexander Zverev Sr.	6	6
(New Zealand) David Lewis	3	2

=== Second qualifier ===
First round
2	(Australia) Broderick Dyke	6	3	6
(United States) Ricky Brown	4	6	3
(Australia) Neil Smith	2	1
(New Zealand) Steve Guy	6	6

Second round
2	(Australia) Broderick Dyke	6	6
(Australia) Craig McInnes	0	3
(New Zealand) Steve Guy	4	2
14	(New Zealand) David Mustard	6	6

Qualifying competition
2	(Australia) Broderick Dyke	6	3	6
14	(New Zealand) David Mustard	3	6	3

=== Third qualifier ===
First round
3	(United States) Tom Cain	6	6
(Australia) Craig Tregonning	2	2
(Australia) John James	6	2
(Soviet Union) Andres Võsand	7	6
(Canada) Grant Connell	2	7	8
23	(Australia) Peter Carter	6	6	6

Second round
3	(United States) Tom Cain	6	6
(Australia) Paul Hoysted	0	3
(Soviet Union) Andres Võsand	2	6
(Canada) Grant Connell	6	7

Qualifying competition
3	(United States) Tom Cain	6	6
(Canada) Grant Connell	3	3

=== Fourth qualifier ===
First round
(Australia) Russell Barlow	6	6
(Australia) Patrick Flynn	3	2
(Australia) Antony Emerson	2	6	2
(West Germany) Karl Richter	6	4	6

Second round
4	(South Africa) Eddie Edwards	2	6	6
(Australia) Russell Barlow	6	3	4
(West Germany) Karl Richter	3	4
16	(Australia) Craig A. Miller	6	6

Qualifying competition
4	(South Africa) Eddie Edwards	4	4
16	(Australia) Craig A. Miller	6	6

=== Fifth qualifier ===
First round
(United States) Cary Stansbury	6	6
(United States) Craig Kardon	4	4
(West Germany) Peter Moraing	4	3
13	(United Kingdom) Stuart Bale	6	6

Second round
5	(Soviet Union) Andrei Chesnokov	2	6	6
(United States) Cary Stansbury	6	4	4
(Canada) Chris Pridham	4	4
13	(United Kingdom) Stuart Bale	6	6

Qualifying competition
5	(Soviet Union) Andrei Chesnokov	6	4	3
13	(United Kingdom) Stuart Bale	3	6	6

=== Sixth qualifier ===
First round
(United States) Lior Rusinek	2	6	6
(Australia) Richard Fricker	6	2	2
(West Germany) Alexander Mronz	2	5
(Australia) Laurie Warder	6	7
(United States) Ted Erck	7	2	1
22	(France) Éric Winogradsky	6	6	6

Second round
6	(South Africa) Michael Robertson	3	4
(United States) Lior Rusinek	6	6
(Australia) Laurie Warder	6	6
22	(France) Éric Winogradsky	1	2

Qualifying competition
(United States) Lior Rusinek	6	3	4
(Australia) Laurie Warder	3	6	6

=== Seventh qualifier ===
First round
7	(United States) Todd Nelson	2	6	6
(Australia) John McCurdy	6	4	4
(United States) Rick Rudeen	4	6	8
(Australia) Charlton Eagle	6	3	6
(Australia) Richard Cahill	4	3
15	(France) Thierry Champion	6	6

Second round
7	(United States) Todd Nelson	6	6
(United States) Rick Rudeen	4	0
(United Kingdom) Jason Goodall	6	5	1
15	(France) Thierry Champion	4	7	6

Qualifying competition
7	(United States) Todd Nelson	6	6	6
15	(France) Thierry Champion	2	7	1

=== Eighth qualifier ===
First round
(Australia) Anthony Lane	2	7	6
(Australia) David Graham	6	6	2
(Australia) Peter Johnston	6	6	6
20	(Nigeria) Tony Mmoh	4	7	3

Second round
8	(South Africa) Gary Muller	6	6
(Australia) Anthony Lane	3	4
(Australia) Mike Baroch	7	7
(Australia) Peter Johnston	6	5

Qualifying competition
8	(South Africa) Gary Muller	6	6
(Australia) Mike Baroch	0	1

=== Ninth qualifier ===
First round
(Canada) Doug Burke	3	6	6
(Australia) Gavin Pfitzner	6	2	3
(Australia) Ron Woodbridge	6	2	3
(Australia) Mark Jeffrey	2	6	6

Second round
9	(United States) Brett Dickinson	4	4
(Canada) Doug Burke	6	6
(Australia) Mark Jeffrey	2	6	3
24	(United States) Steve Denton	6	4	6

Qualifying competition
(Canada) Doug Burke	2	3
24	(United States) Steve Denton	6	6

=== Tenth qualifier ===
First round
(Australia) Des Tyson	7	6
(Australia) Brett Custer	5	2
(Australia) Daryl Greeves	3	2
18	(Australia) Mark Kratzmann	6	6

Second round
10	(New Zealand) Bruce Derlin	6	6
(Australia) Des Tyson	3	2
(Australia) Dale Houston	4	1
18	(Australia) Mark Kratzmann	6	6

Qualifying competition
10	(New Zealand) Bruce Derlin	5	7	6
18	(Australia) Mark Kratzmann	7	6	1

=== Eleventh qualifier ===
First round
11	(United States) Tomm Warneke	6	5	6
(Australia) Michael Fancutt	3	7	2
(Australia) Roger Rasheed	6	6
(United Kingdom) Peter Russell	1	3
(United Kingdom) Chris Kermode	2	3
(West Germany) Jaromir Becka	6	6

Second round
11	(United States) Tomm Warneke	2	6
(Australia) Roger Rasheed	6	7
(West Germany) Jaromir Becka	6	7
17	(Canada) Hatem McDadi	4	6

Qualifying competition
(Australia) Roger Rasheed	6	2	6
(West Germany) Jaromir Becka	3	6	3

=== Twelfth qualifier ===
First round
12	(Australia) Carl Limberger	6	6
(Australia) Jamie Harty	1	3
(United Kingdom) Nick Fulwood	2	7	3
(Australia) Steve Furlong	6	5	6
(Australia) Brad Williams	6	4
19	(United States) Marcel Freeman	7	6

Second round
12	(Australia) Carl Limberger	4	7	6
(Canada) Mark Greenan	6	5	1
(Australia) Steve Furlong	4	4
19	(United States) Marcel Freeman	6	6

Qualifying competition
12	(Australia) Carl Limberger	6	3
19	(United States) Marcel Freeman	7	6
