= 1984 Australian Open – Women's singles qualifying =

Women's singles qualifying
- 1984 Australian Open

Events
Singles	men	women		boys	girls
Doubles	men	women	mixed	boys	girls
WC Singles	men	women	quad
WC Doubles	men	women	quad
Legends	men	women	mixed

Qualification
Singles	men	women
- Australian Open

This article displays the qualifying draw for women's singles at the 1984 Australian Open.

== Seeds ==
1. (Japan) Masako Yanagi (first round)
2. (United States) Lori McNeil (first round)
3. (France) Catherine Suire (first round)
4. (United Kingdom) Amanda Brown (qualifying competition)
5. -
6. (Soviet Union) Natasha Reva (first round)
7. (United States) Lea Antonoplis (qualified)
8. (United States) Kim Steinmetz (qualifying competition)

== Qualifiers ==
1. (United States) Barbara Gerken
2. (France) Sophie Amiach
3. (France) Corinne Vanier
4. (Soviet Union) Svetlana Parkhomenko
5. (United States) Lea Antonoplis
6. (Soviet Union) Larisa Neiland
7. (Australia) Colleen Carney
8. (United Kingdom) Sara Gomer

== Qualifying draw ==
Key

- Q = Qualifier
- WC = Wild card
- LL = Lucky loser
- Alt = Alternate
- ITF = ITF entry
- PR = Protected ranking
- SR = Special ranking
- SE = Special exempt
- JE = Junior exempt
- JR = Junior Accelerator Programme entrant
- CO = College Accelerator Programme entrant
- NG = Next Gen Accelerator Program entrant
- w/o = Walkover
- r = Retired
- d = Defaulted

=== First qualifier ===
First round
1	(Japan) Masako Yanagi	6^{8}	2
(United States) Barbara Gerken	7^{10}	6
(Australia) Michelle Turk	6	6
(Soviet Union) Elena Eliseenko	3	2

Qualifying competition
(United States) Barbara Gerken	6	4	6
(Australia) Michelle Turk	4	6	1

=== Second qualifier ===
First round
(United States) Maeve Quinlan	0	3
(France) Nathalie Herreman	6	6
(United Kingdom) Rina Einy	5	4
Alt	(France) Sophie Amiach	7	6

Qualifying competition
(France) Nathalie Herreman	6	0	3
Alt	(France) Sophie Amiach	3	6	6

=== Third qualifier ===
First round
4	(United Kingdom) Amanda Brown	6	6
(Japan) Emiko Okagawa	1	2
(France) Corinne Vanier	6	6
(Switzerland) Susanne Schmid	2	3

Qualifying competition
4	(United Kingdom) Amanda Brown	6^{3}	7	3
(France) Corinne Vanier	7^{7}	5	6

=== Fourth qualifier ===
First round
(Soviet Union) Svetlana Parkhomenko	6	6
(Australia) Miranda Yates	1	4
(United Kingdom) Sue Barker	6^{4}	2
8	(United States) Kim Steinmetz	7^{7}	6

Qualifying competition
(Soviet Union) Svetlana Parkhomenko	6	6
8	(United States) Kim Steinmetz	4	4

=== Fifth qualifier ===
First round
7	(United States) Lea Antonoplis	6	1	7
(Sweden) Catrin Jexell	1	6	5
(Australia) Amanda Tobin	7^{7}	3	6
(South Africa) Jennifer Reinbold	6^{3}	6	3

Qualifying competition
7	(United States) Lea Antonoplis	6	6
(Australia) Amanda Tobin	4	3

=== Sixth qualifier ===
First round
(United States) Candy Reynolds	7	2	6
(United Kingdom) Julie Salmon	5	6	2
(Soviet Union) Larisa Neiland	7^{7}	6^{3}	6
3	(France) Catherine Suire	6^{0}	7^{7}	4

Qualifying competition
(United States) Candy Reynolds	1	3
(Soviet Union) Larisa Neiland	6	6

=== Seventh qualifier ===
First round
6	(Soviet Union) Natasha Reva	2	4
(Australia) Colleen Carney	6	6
(Sweden) Carin Anderholm	3	5
(United States) Molly Van Nostrand	6	7

Qualifying competition
(Australia) Colleen Carney	7	6
(United States) Molly Van Nostrand	5	3

=== Eighth qualifier ===
First round
(United States) Linda Howell	6	7
(United States) Robin White	4	5
(United Kingdom) Sara Gomer	6	6
2	(United States) Lori McNeil	4	3

Qualifying competition
(United States) Linda Howell	4	3
(United Kingdom) Sara Gomer	6	6
