= 1985 Nutri-Metics Open – Doubles =

Doubles
- 1985 Nutri-Metics Open

Final
- Champions: (United Kingdom) Anne Hobbs (United States) Candy Reynolds
- Runners-up: (United States) Lea Antonoplis (Argentina) Adriana Villagrán
- Score: 6–1, 6–3

Details
- Draw: 16
- Seeds: 4

Events
Singles	Doubles
- WTA Auckland Open

Pam Whytcross and S. Chapman were the last tournament winners in 1981. They did not compete this year.

Anne Hobbs and Candy Reynolds won the title by defeating Lea Antonoplis and Adriana Villagrán 6–1, 6–3 in the final.

== Seeds ==
1. (United Kingdom) Anne Hobbs / (United States) Candy Reynolds (champions)
2. (United States) Lea Antonoplis / (Argentina) Adriana Villagrán (final)
3. (New Zealand) Belinda Cordwell / (New Zealand) Julie Richardson (semifinals)
4. (United States) Caryn Copeland / (United States) Anna-Maria Fernandez (semifinals)

== Draw ==
Key

- Q = Qualifier
- WC = Wild card
- LL = Lucky loser
- Alt = Alternate
- ITF = ITF entry
- PR = Protected ranking
- SR = Special ranking
- SE = Special exempt
- JE = Junior exempt
- JR = Junior Accelerator Programme entrant
- CO = College Accelerator Programme entrant
- NG = Next Gen Accelerator Program entrant
- w/o = Walkover
- r = Retired
- d = Defaulted

=== Draw ===
First round
1	(United Kingdom) A Hobbs (United States) C Reynolds	7	6
(Australia) L Field (Australia) M Turk	5	2
(Australia) S Faulkner (Australia) Donna Littleton	6	4	0
(Australia) M Jaggard (Australia) Vicki Marler	4	6	6
3	(New Zealand) B Cordwell (New Zealand) J Richardson	6	6
(New Zealand) Edith Tatana unknown	0	1
(Australia) Jackie Masters (New Zealand) M Parun	6	6
(New Zealand) Amanda Tate (New Zealand) C Toleafoa	3	2
(Belgium) Marlene de Wouters (United Kingdom) D Parnell	3	1
(Australia) R Bryant (Australia) C Carney	6	6
(Switzerland) C Bartos-Cserepy (New Zealand) B Perry	7	5	3
4	(United States) C Copeland (United States) AM Fernandez	6	7	6
(New Zealand) R Seeman (New Zealand) Linda Stewart	5	6
(United States) Mary Dailey (United States) B Norton	7	7
(United States) M Schillig (Australia) A Scott	2	3
2	(United States) L Antonoplis (Argentina) A Villagrán	6	6

Quarterfinals
1	(United Kingdom) A Hobbs (United States) C Reynolds	6	6
(Australia) M Jaggard (Australia) Vicki Marler	3	2
3	(New Zealand) B Cordwell (New Zealand) J Richardson	6	6
(Australia) Jackie Masters (New Zealand) M Parun	4	3
(Australia) R Bryant (Australia) C Carney	6	7	5
4	(United States) C Copeland (United States) AM Fernandez	7	6	7
(United States) Mary Dailey (United States) B Norton	7	2	2
2	(United States) L Antonoplis (Argentina) A Villagrán	6	6	6

Semifinals
1	(United Kingdom) A Hobbs (United States) C Reynolds	5	6	6
3	(New Zealand) B Cordwell (New Zealand) J Richardson	7	4	3
4	(United States) C Copeland (United States) AM Fernandez	3	3
2	(United States) L Antonoplis (Argentina) A Villagrán	6	6

Final
1	(United Kingdom) A Hobbs (United States) C Reynolds	6	6
2	(United States) L Antonoplis (Argentina) A Villagrán	1	3
