= 1989 Nutri-Metics Open – Singles =

Singles
- 1989 Nutri-Metics Open

Final
- Champion: (United States) Patty Fendick
- Runner-up: (New Zealand) Belinda Cordwell
- Score: 6–2, 6–0

Details
- Draw: 32
- Seeds: 8

Events
Singles	Doubles
← 1988 ·	Nutri-Metics Open	· 1990 →

Patty Fendick was the defending champion and won in the final 6–2, 6–0 against Belinda Cordwell.

== Seeds ==
A champion seed is indicated in bold text while text in italics indicates the round in which that seed was eliminated.

1. (United States) **Patty Fendick (champion)**
2. (United States) Gretchen Magers (second round)
3. (Spain) Conchita Martínez (quarterfinals)
4. (United States) Halle Cioffi (second round)
5. (Belgium) Sandra Wasserman (second round)
6. (New Zealand) Belinda Cordwell (final)
7. (United Kingdom) Jo Durie (semifinals)
8. (United States) Beverly Bowes (quarterfinals)

== Draw ==
=== Key ===
- Q = Qualifier
- WC = Wild card
- LL = Lucky loser
- Alt = Alternate
- SE = Special exempt
- PR = Protected ranking
- ITF = ITF entry
- JE = Junior exempt
- w/o = Walkover
- r = Retired
- d = Defaulted
- SR = Special ranking

First round
1	(United States) **P Fendick**	**6**	**6**
(United States) H Ludloff	1	2
(United Kingdom) C Wood	**6**	4	6
Q	(Australia) **E Smylie**	4	**6**	**7**
(United States) A Ivan	**6**	2	3
(Sweden) **M Lindström**	3	**6**	**6**
(Hungary) A Temesvári	5	0
5	(Belgium) **S Wasserman**	**7**	**6**
4	(United States) **H Cioffi**	**6**	**6**
(Australia) M Jaggard	1	1
(Canada) R Simpson	3	1
(United States) **D Faber**	**6**	**6**
(New Zealand) R Seeman	3	4
(United States) **E Burgin**	**6**	**6**
(West Germany) S Auer	3	1
8	(United States) **B Bowes**	**6**	**6**
6	(New Zealand) **B Cordwell**	**6**	**6**
LL	(Hong Kong) P Hy	0	2
(United States) **K Horvath**	**6**	**6**
(Canada) J Hetherington	0	2
(West Germany) **C Porwik**	**6**	0	**6**
Q	(Australia) L Field	1	**6**	4
(Sweden) M Strandlund	1	4
3	(Spain) **C Martínez**	**6**	**6**
7	(United Kingdom) **J Durie**	**6**	**6**
Q	(Australia) J-A Faull	4	1
LL	(Sweden) J Jonerup	4	4
(Switzerland) **C Cohen**	**6**	**6**
Q	(Sweden) M Ekstrand	1	3
(West Germany) **W Probst**	**6**	**6**
(New Zealand) C Toleafoa	1	6
2	(United States) **G Magers**	**6**	**7**

Second round
1	(United States) **P Fendick**	**6**	**6**
Q	(Australia) E Smylie	2	3
(Sweden) **M Lindström**	**6**	**6**
5	(Belgium) S Wasserman	4	4
4	(United States) H Cioffi	4	3
(United States) **D Faber**	**6**	**6**
(United States) E Burgin	1	**7**	4
8	(United States) **B Bowes**	**6**	6	**6**
6	(New Zealand) **B Cordwell**	**3**
(United States) K Horvath	0	r
(West Germany) C Porwik	4	1
3	(Spain) **C Martínez**	**6**	**6**
7	(United Kingdom) **J Durie**	5	**6**	**7**
(Switzerland) C Cohen	**7**	0	6
(West Germany) **W Probst**	**7**	1	**6**
2	(United States) G Magers	5	**6**	3

Quarterfinals
1	(United States) **P Fendick**	**6**	**6**
(Sweden) M Lindström	2	0
(United States) **D Faber**	3	**6**	**6**
8	(United States) B Bowes	**6**	3	2
6	(New Zealand) **B Cordwell**	**6**	**6**
3	(Spain) C Martínez	4	2
7	(United Kingdom) **J Durie**	**6**	**6**
(West Germany) W Probst	4	4

Semifinals
1	(United States) **P Fendick**	**6**	**6**
(United States) D Faber	4	2
6	(New Zealand) **B Cordwell**	**6**	6	**6**
7	(United Kingdom) J Durie	3	**7**	3

Final
1	(United States) **Patty Fendick**	**6**	**6**
6	(New Zealand) Belinda Cordwell	2	0
