= 1989 Nutri-Metics Open – Doubles =

Doubles
- 1989 Nutri-Metics Open
- 1988 Champions: (United States) Patty Fendick (Canada) Jill Hetherington

Final
- Champions: (United States) Patty Fendick (Canada) Jill Hetherington
- Runners-up: (Australia) Elizabeth Smylie (Australia) Janine Tremelling
- Score: 6–4, 6–4

Details
- Draw: 16
- Seeds: 4

Events
Singles	Doubles
← 1988 ·	WTA Auckland Open	· 1990 →

Patty Fendick and Jill Hetherington were the defending champions and won in the final 6–4, 6–4 against Elizabeth Smylie and Janine Tremelling.

== Seeds ==
Champion seeds are indicated in bold text while text in italics indicates the round in which those seeds were eliminated.

1. (United States) **Patty Fendick** / (Canada) **Jill Hetherington (champions)**
2. (Australia) Elizabeth Smylie / (Australia) Janine Tremelling (final)
3. (New Zealand) Belinda Cordwell / (United Kingdom) Jo Durie (semifinals)
4. (United States) Lea Antonoplis / (United States) Kathleen Horvath (first round)

== Draw ==
=== Key ===
- Q = Qualifier
- WC = Wild card
- LL = Lucky loser
- Alt = Alternate
- SE = Special exempt
- PR = Protected ranking
- ITF = ITF entry
- JE = Junior exempt
- w/o = Walkover
- r = Retired
- d = Defaulted
- SR = Special ranking

First round
1	(United States) **P Fendick** (Canada) **J Hetherington**	**6**	**6**
(Australia) L Field (Australia) M Jaggard	2	2
(United States) **C MacGregor** (Australia) **A Scott**	4	**6**	**7**
(New Zealand) R Seeman (New Zealand) C Toleafoa	**6**	1	6
4	(United States) L Antonoplis (United States) K Horvath	**6**	1	4
(Spain) **C Martínez** (West Germany) **C Porwik**	4	**6**	**6**
(United States) **J Fuchs** (Sweden) **M Strandlund**	**6**	1	**7**
(Netherlands) S Schilder (United Kingdom) C Wood	4	**6**	6
(United States) L Bartlett (Australia) J-A Faull	4	4
(Sweden) **M Lindström** (United States) **H Ludloff**	**6**	**6**
(West Germany) A Betzner (West Germany) W Probst	3	**7**	1
3	(New Zealand) **B Cordwell** (United Kingdom) **J Durie**	**6**	6	**6**
(United States) **B Bowes** (United States) **G Magers**	**6**	**6**
(Australia) T Morton (Austria) H Sprung	2	3
(Hong Kong) P Hy (Belgium) S Wasserman	0	2
2	(Australia) **E Smylie** (Australia) **J Tremelling**	**6**	**6**

Quarterfinals
1	(United States) **P Fendick** (Canada) **J Hetherington**	**6**	6	**6**
(United States) C MacGregor (Australia) A Scott	4	**7**	2
(Spain) **C Martínez** (West Germany) **C Porwik**	**6**	**6**
(United States) J Fuchs (Sweden) M Strandlund	4	2
(Sweden) M Lindström (United States) H Ludloff	3	**6**	6
3	(New Zealand) **B Cordwell** (United Kingdom) **J Durie**	**6**	1	**7**
(United States) B Bowes (United States) G Magers	4	**7**	6
2	(Australia) **E Smylie** (Australia) **J Tremelling**	**6**	5	**6**

Semifinals
1	(United States) **P Fendick** (Canada) **J Hetherington**	**6**	**6**
(Spain) C Martínez (West Germany) C Porwik	2	4
3	(New Zealand) B Cordwell (United Kingdom) J Durie	3	2
2	(Australia) **E Smylie** (Australia) **J Tremelling**	**6**	**6**

Final
1	(United States) **Patty Fendick** (Canada) **Jill Hetherington**	**6**	**6**
2	(Australia) Elizabeth Smylie (Australia) Janine Tremelling	4	4
