= 1985 Nutri-Metics Open =

- Date: 9–15 December 1985
- Edition: 1st
- Draw: 16S / 16D
- Prize money: $50,000
- Surface: Grass / outdoor
- Location: Auckland, New Zealand
- Venue: ASB Tennis Centre

Champions

Singles
- (United Kingdom) Anne Hobbs

Doubles
- (United Kingdom) Anne Hobbs (United States) Candy Reynolds
| WTA Auckland Open | · 1987 → |

The 1986 Nutri-Metics Open was a women's tennis tournament played on outdoor grass courts at the ASB Tennis Centre in Auckland in New Zealand and was part of the 1985 Virginia Slims World Championship Series. It was the inaugural edition of the tournament and was held from 9 December until 15 December 1985. Anne Hobbs won the singles title.

== Finals ==
=== Singles ===
(United Kingdom) Anne Hobbs defeated (Australia) Louise Field 6–3, 6–1

- It was Hobbs' 1st singles title of the year and the 2nd of her career.

=== Doubles ===
(United Kingdom) Anne Hobbs / (United States) Candy Reynolds defeated (United States) Lea Antonoplis / (Argentina) Adriana Villagrán 6–1, 6–3

== See also ==
- 1986 Benson and Hedges Open – men's tournament
