= 1988 Nutri-Metics Open – Singles =

Singles
- 1988 Nutri-Metics Open

Final
- Champion: (United States) Patty Fendick
- Runner-up: (United Kingdom) Sara Gomer
- Score: 6–3, 7–6

Details
- Draw: 56
- Seeds: 16

Events
Singles	Doubles
← 1987 ·	Nutri-Metics Open	· 1989 →

Gretchen Magers was the defending champion but lost in the quarterfinals to Sara Gomer.

Patty Fendick won in the final 6–3, 7–6 against Gomer.

== Seeds ==
A champion seed is indicated in bold text while text in italics indicates the round in which that seed was eliminated. The top eight seeds received a bye to the second round.

1. (United States) **Patty Fendick (champion)**
2. (Australia) Anne Minter (second round)
3. (United States) Terry Phelps (quarterfinals)
4. (United States) Gretchen Magers (quarterfinals)
5. (United States) Beverly Bowes (semifinals)
6. (Australia) Elizabeth Minter (second round)
7. (United Kingdom) Sara Gomer (final)
8. (Belgium) Ann Devries (third round)
9. (New Zealand) Belinda Cordwell (third round)
10. (United States) Pam Casale (first round)
11. (United States) Susan Mascarin (third round)
12. (Belgium) Sandra Wasserman (quarterfinals)
13. (Greece) Angeliki Kanellopoulou (second round)
14. (Australia) Louise Field (first round)
15. n/a
16. n/a

== Draw ==
=== Key ===
- Q = Qualifier
- WC = Wild card
- LL = Lucky loser
- Alt = Alternate
- SE = Special exempt
- PR = Protected ranking
- ITF = ITF entry
- JE = Junior exempt
- w/o = Walkover
- r = Retired
- d = Defaulted
- SR = Special ranking

=== Finals ===
Semifinals
1	(United States) **Patty Fendick**	**6**	**6**
5	(United States) Beverly Bowes	2	3
7	(United Kingdom) **Sara Gomer**	**7**	**6**
(France) Emmanuelle Derly	6	3

Final
1	(United States) **Patty Fendick**	**6**	**7**
7	(United Kingdom) Sara Gomer	3	6

=== Top half ===
==== Section 1 ====
First round
(Netherlands) C Bakkum	4	1
(New Zealand) **J Richardson**	**6**	**6**
(United States) J Golder	2	**6**	6
(United Kingdom) **V Lake**	**6**	3	**7**
(United States) C Reynolds	1	3
13	(Greece) **A Kanellopoulou**	**6**	**6**
12	(Belgium) **S Wasserman**	**6**	**6**
(United States) A M Fernandez	1	0
(United States) **K Steinmetz**	4	**6**	**6**
(Sweden) H Dahlström	**6**	2	0
(Australia) L O'Neill	4	**6**	6
(United Kingdom) **A Croft**	**6**	3	**7**

Second round
1	(United States) **P Fendick**	**6**	**6**
(New Zealand) J Richardson	2	1
(United Kingdom) **V Lake**	**6**	**7**
13	(Greece) A Kanellopoulou	4	5
12	(Belgium) **S Wasserman**	**7**	**6**
(United States) K Steinmetz	6	3
(United Kingdom) A Croft	4	1
8	(Belgium) **A Devries**	**6**	**6**

Third round
1	(United States) **P Fendick**	**6**	**6**
(United Kingdom) V Lake	3	0
12	(Belgium) **S Wasserman**	**6**	**6**
8	(Belgium) A Devries	2	2

Quarterfinals
1	(United States) **P Fendick**	**6**	**6**
12	(Belgium) S Wasserman	3	1

==== Section 2 ====
First round
(United States) K Adams	2	3
(United States) **L Antonoplis**	**6**	**6**
(United States) Ca MacGregor	1	**6**	4
(New Zealand) **R Seeman**	**6**	3	**6**
(United Kingdom) **T Catlin**	**6**	**6**
10	(United States) P Casale	4	2
(France) M Laval	**6**	4	2
(United States) **C Christian**	3	**6**	**6**
(Japan) **Y Koizumi**	**7**	**6**
(United States) D-A Hansel	6	3
(Canada) **J Hetherington**	**6**	**6**
(United States) P Smith	0	2

Second round
3	(United States) **T Phelps**	3	**6**	**6**
(United States) L Antonoplis	**6**	2	0
(New Zealand) **R Seeman**	5	**6**	**6**
(United Kingdom) T Catlin	**7**	4	0
(United States) **C Christian**	2	**6**	**6**
(Japan) Y Koizumi	**6**	1	0
(Canada) J Hetherington	4	3
5	(United States) **B Bowes**	**6**	**6**

Third round
3	(United States) **T Phelps**	**6**	**6**
(New Zealand) R Seeman	1	0
(United States) C Christian	2	1
5	(United States) **B Bowes**	**6**	**6**

Quarterfinals
3	(United States) T Phelps	4	3
5	(United States) **B Bowes**	**6**	**6**

=== Bottom half ===
==== Section 3 ====
First round
(United States) A Schwartz	2	2
(Canada) **M Drake**	**6**	**6**
(Peru) **P Vásquez**	**6**	**6**
(Australia) J Byrne	2	0
(France) **M-C Calleja**	**6**	**7**
14	(Australia) L Field	3	6
9	(New Zealand) **B Cordwell**	**6**	**7**
(Netherlands) M van der Torre	2	5
(United Kingdom) **M Javer**	**6**	**6**
(Norway) A Jonsson	4	4
(France) **S Niox-Chateau**	**6**	**6**
(United States) Cy MacGregor	3	1

Second round
7	(United Kingdom) **S Gomer**	5	**6**	**6**
(Canada) M Drake	**7**	3	1
(Peru) P Vásquez	2	1
(France) **M-C Calleja**	**6**	**6**
9	(New Zealand) **B Cordwell**	**6**	3	**7**
(United Kingdom) M Javer	0	**6**	5
(France) S Niox-Chateau	2	3
4	(United States) **G Magers**	**6**	**6**

Third round
7	(United Kingdom) **S Gomer**	**6**	**7**
(France) M-C Calleja	2	5
9	(New Zealand) B Cordwell	3	3
4	(United States) **G Magers**	**6**	**6**

Quarterfinals
7	(United Kingdom) **S Gomer**	**6**	**6**
4	(United States) G Magers	1	3

==== Section 4 ====
First round
(United States) **P Jung**	**7**	4	**6**
(Japan) A Nishiya	6	**6**	1
(Switzerland) C Cohen	4	3
(United Kingdom) **C Wood**	**6**	**6**
(United Kingdom) J Salmon	6	0
(Netherlands) **N Jagerman**	**7**	**6**
11	(United States) **S Mascarin**	**6**	**6**
(United States) V Nelson-Dunbar	2	2
(New Zealand) **C Toleafoa**	**6**	**6**
(Netherlands) Y der Kinderen	3	2
(France) **E Derly**	**7**	**6**
(Australia) M Jaggard	5	4

Second round
6	(Australia) E Minter	**6**	3	4
(United States) **P Jung**	4	**6**	**6**
(United Kingdom) **C Wood**	**6**	**6**
(Netherlands) N Jagerman	2	0
11	(United States) **S Mascarin**	**6**	**7**
(New Zealand) C Toleafoa	3	5
(France) **E Derly**	**6**	**6**
2	(Australia) A Minter	3	3

Third round
(United States) P Jung	1	3
(United Kingdom) **C Wood**	**6**	**6**
11	(United States) S Mascarin	1	6
(France) **E Derly**	**6**	**7**

Quarterfinals
(United Kingdom) C Wood	**6**	5	4
(France) **E Derly**	4	**7**	**6**
