= 1988 Nutri-Metics Open =

- Date: 25 – 31 January
- Edition: 3rd
- Category: Category 1
- Draw: 56S / 24D
- Prize money: $50,000
- Surface: Hard / outdoor
- Location: Auckland, New Zealand
- Venue: ASB Tennis Centre

Champions

Singles
- (United States) Patty Fendick

Doubles
- (United States) Patty Fendick / (Canada) Jill Hetherington
← 1987 ·	WTA Auckland Open	· 1989 →

The 1988 Nutri-Metics Open was a women's tennis tournament played on outdoor hard courts at the ASB Tennis Centre in Auckland in New Zealand and was part of the Category 1 tier of the 1988 Virginia Slims World Championship Series. It was the third edition of the tournament and ran from 25 January until 31 January 1988. Patty Fendick won the singles title.

== Finals ==
=== Singles ===
(United States) Patty Fendick defeated (United Kingdom) Sara Gomer 6–3, 7–6^{(7–3)}

- It was Fendick's 1st title of the year and the 1st of her career.

=== Doubles ===
(United States) Patty Fendick / (Canada) Jill Hetherington defeated (United States) Cammy MacGregor / (United States) Cynthia MacGregor 6–2, 6–1

- It was Fendick's 2nd title of the year and the 2nd of her career. It was Hetherington's 1st title of the year and the 2nd of her career.

== See also ==
- 1988 Benson and Hedges Open – men's tournament
