= Ted Erck =

American tennis player

- Full name: Brian Theodore Erck
- Country (sports): United States
- Born: February 14, 1961 (age 64); Fullerton, California
- Height: 6 ft 4 in (193 cm)

Singles
- Highest ranking: No. 543 (May 19, 1986)

Grand Slam singles results
- Australian Open: Q1 (1985)
- Wimbledon: Q2 (1986)

Doubles
- Career record: 3–8
- Highest ranking: No. 213 (Dec 29, 1986)

Grand Slam doubles results
- Australian Open: 2R (1985)

Brian Theodore "Ted" Erck (born February 14, 1961) is an American former professional tennis player.

Erck grew up in Houston and attended The Kinkaid School. He played collegiate tennis for the University of Texas, graduating with an economics degree in 1983.

While competing on the professional tour he made appearances in grand slam tournaments including the 1985 Australian Open, where he reached the round of 16 in men's doubles.

== ATP Challenger finals ==
=== Doubles: 1 (0–1) ===
No.	Result	Date	Tournament	Surface	Partner	Opponents	Score
Loss	1.	Feb 1986	Enugu, Nigeria	Hard	(United States) Brett Buffington	(Czechoslovakia) Stanislav Birner (United States) Charles Strode	4–6, 6–7
