= 1988 Australian Open – Women's singles qualifying =

Women's singles qualifying
- 1988 Australian Open

Events
Singles	men	women		boys	girls
Doubles	men	women	mixed	boys	girls
WC Singles	men	women	quad
WC Doubles	men	women	quad
Legends	men	women	mixed

Qualification
Singles	men	women
- Australian Open

This article displays the qualifying draw for women's singles at the 1988 Australian Open.

== Seeds ==
1. (United States) Lindsay Bartlett (qualified)
2. (Israel) Ilana Berger (second round)
3. (United States) Sheri Norris (qualifying competition, lucky loser)
4. (Australia) Tracey Morton (second round)
5. (United States) Jane Thomas (first round)
6. (United States) Pamela Jung (qualified)
7. (United States) Erika Smith (first round)
8. (Austria) Heidi Sprung (first round)
9. (United States) Jenni Goodling (qualified)
10. (Hong Kong) Paulette Moreno (qualifying competition, lucky loser)
11. (United States) Stephanie Savides (qualifying competition, lucky loser)
12. (United States) Jennifer Fuchs (qualified)
13. (United States) Wendy Wood (qualified)
14. (United Kingdom) Amanda Grunfeld (first round)
15. (United Kingdom) Katie Rickett (qualifying competition, lucky loser)
16. (United Kingdom) Sarah Loosemore (qualified)

== Qualifiers ==
1. (United States) Lindsay Bartlett
2. (United Kingdom) Sarah Loosemore
3. (United States) Wendy Wood
4. (United States) Pamela Jung
5. (Japan) Ei Iida
6. (United States) Jenni Goodling
7. (United Kingdom) Teresa Catlin
8. (United States) Jennifer Fuchs

== Lucky losers ==
1. (Hong Kong) Paulette Moreno
2. (United Kingdom) Katie Rickett
3. (United States) Jill Smoller
4. (United States) Sheri Norris
5. (United States) Stephanie Savides

== Qualifying draw ==
Key

- Q = Qualifier
- WC = Wild card
- LL = Lucky loser
- Alt = Alternate
- ITF = ITF entry
- PR = Protected ranking
- SR = Special ranking
- SE = Special exempt
- JE = Junior exempt
- JR = Junior Accelerator Programme entrant
- CO = College Accelerator Programme entrant
- NG = Next Gen Accelerator Program entrant
- w/o = Walkover
- r = Retired
- d = Defaulted

=== First qualifier ===
First round
(United States) Gail Falkenberg	6	6
(Australia) Alison De Vries	0	1
(Australia) Natalia Leipus	6	6
(Australia) Robyn Lamb	4	4
(Australia) Wendy Shipp	1	0
11	(United States) Stephanie Savides	6	6

Second round
1	(United States) Lindsay Bartlett	7^{7}	6
(United States) Gail Falkenberg	6^{5}	1
(Australia) Natalia Leipus	2	3
11	(United States) Stephanie Savides	6	6

Qualifying competition
1	(United States) Lindsay Bartlett	7	4	6
11	(United States) Stephanie Savides	5	6	4

=== Second qualifier ===
First round
16	(United Kingdom) Sarah Loosemore	6	7
(United States) Judy Newman	3	5
(United States) Jan Blackstad	6	6
(Australia) Tania Everoll	3	1
(United States) Eve Zimmerman	5	2
(Australia) Tracey Moyle	7	6
(United Kingdom) Samantha Smith	3	6	7
7	(United States) Erika Smith	6	4	5

Second round
16	(United Kingdom) Sarah Loosemore	7^{7}	6
(United States) Jan Blackstad	6^{4}	1
(Australia) Tracey Moyle	6	3	3
(United Kingdom) Samantha Smith	3	6	6

Qualifying competition
16	(United Kingdom) Sarah Loosemore	6	6
(United Kingdom) Samantha Smith	1	4

=== Third qualifier ===
First round
(Australia) Catherine O'Dea	3	6	2
(United States) Janet Craig	6	1	6
(Australia) Danielle Jones	3	6	4
WC	(Australia) Joanna Meagher	6	1	6
WC	(Australia) Samantha Knight	3	6^{2}
13	(United States) Wendy Wood	6	7^{7}

Second round
3	(United States) Sheri Norris	6	7^{8}
(United States) Janet Craig	1	6^{6}
WC	(Australia) Joanna Meagher	1	5
13	(United States) Wendy Wood	6	7

Qualifying competition
3	(United States) Sheri Norris	2	3
13	(United States) Wendy Wood	6	6

=== Fourth qualifier ===
First round
10	(Hong Kong) Paulette Moreno	6	6
(Australia) Helen O'Dea	1	2
(Australia) Robyn Mawdsley	6	3	1
(United States) Jackie Joseph	3	6	6
(Australia) Lisa Weerasekera	7	6
(Australia) Julie Fidler	5	1
(United States) Jaime Kaplan	3	2
6	(United States) Pamela Jung	6	6

Second round
10	(Hong Kong) Paulette Moreno	6	4	6
(United States) Jackie Joseph	1	6	3
(Australia) Lisa Weerasekera	0	1
6	(United States) Pamela Jung	6	6

Qualifying competition
10	(Hong Kong) Paulette Moreno	3	7	0
6	(United States) Pamela Jung	6	5	6

=== Fifth qualifier ===
First round
5	(United States) Jane Thomas	3	6^{4}
(United Kingdom) Rachel Viollet	6	7^{7}
(Australia) Susan Katzen	4	1
(Japan) Naoko Sato	6	6
(Australia) Sharon McNamara	4	5
WC	(Australia) Rennae Stubbs	6	7
(Japan) Ei Iida	6	6
14	(United Kingdom) Amanda Grunfeld	3	3

Second round
(United Kingdom) Rachel Viollet	6	4	6
(Japan) Naoko Sato	1	6	1
WC	(Australia) Rennae Stubbs	3	3
(Japan) Ei Iida	6	6

Qualifying competition
(United Kingdom) Rachel Viollet	7^{9}	1	2
(Japan) Ei Iida	6^{7}	6	6

=== Sixth qualifier ===
First round
9	(United States) Jenni Goodling	6	6
(Australia) Loretta Sheales	1	0
(Australia) Vanessa Frlan
WC	(Australia) Samantha Ewart	w/o
(United States) Kyle Copeland	3	3
WC	(Australia) Kim Staunton	6	6

Second round
9	(United States) Jenni Goodling	6	6
(Australia) Vanessa Frlan	1	3
WC	(Australia) Kim Staunton	6	6
4	(Australia) Tracey Morton	2	2

Qualifying competition
9	(United States) Jenni Goodling	6	6
WC	(Australia) Kim Staunton	3	3

=== Seventh qualifier ===
First round
8	(Austria) Heidi Sprung	0	3
(Australia) Jackie Masters	6	6
(Australia) Gina Fogarty	1	2
(United Kingdom) Teresa Catlin	6	6
(Australia) Annette Patchen	6	1	7
(Australia) Anissa Groves	4	6	9
(United Kingdom) Alexandra Niepel	7	4	2
15	(United Kingdom) Katie Rickett	5	6	6

Second round
(Australia) Jackie Masters	1	5
(United Kingdom) Teresa Catlin	6	7
(Australia) Anissa Groves	6^{3}	6^{5}
15	(United Kingdom) Katie Rickett	7^{7}	7^{7}

Qualifying competition
(United Kingdom) Teresa Catlin	7	6
15	(United Kingdom) Katie Rickett	5	2

=== Eighth qualifier ===
First round
12	(United States) Jennifer Fuchs	6	6
(United States) Angel Cobbs	1	2
(Australia) Kate McDonald	6	6
(Japan) Kazuko Ito	4	3
(Australia) Bilynda Potter	2	2
(United States) Jill Smoller	6	6

Second round
12	(United States) Jennifer Fuchs	6^{5}	6	6
(Australia) Kate McDonald	7^{7}	3	1
(United States) Jill Smoller	7	6
2	(Israel) Ilana Berger	5	2

Qualifying competition
12	(United States) Jennifer Fuchs	6	6
(United States) Jill Smoller	3	2
