= 1990 Nutri-Metics International =

- Date: 29 January – 4 February
- Edition: 5th
- Category: Tier V
- Draw: 32S / 16D
- Prize money: $75,000
- Surface: Hard / outdoor
- Location: Auckland, New Zealand
- Venue: ASB Tennis Centre

Champions

Singles
- (Soviet Union) Leila Meskhi

Doubles
- (Soviet Union) Natalia Medvedeva / (Soviet Union) Leila Meskhi
← 1989 ·	WTA Auckland Open	· 1991 →

The 1990 Nutri-Metics Bendon Classic was a women's tennis tournament played on outdoor hard courts at the ASB Tennis Centre in Auckland in New Zealand that was part of Tier V of the 1990 WTA Tour. It was the fifth edition of the tournament and was held from 29 January until 4 February 1990. Second-seeded Leila Meskhi won the singles title.

== Finals ==
=== Singles ===
(Soviet Union) Leila Meskhi defeated (Belgium) Sabine Appelmans 6–1, 6–0

- It was Meskhi's 1st singles title of the year and the 2nd of her career.

=== Doubles ===
(Soviet Union) Natalia Medvedeva / (Soviet Union) Leila Meskhi defeated (Canada) Jill Hetherington / (United States) Robin White 3–6, 6–3, 7–6^{(7–3)}

== See also ==
- 1990 Benson and Hedges Open – men's tournament
