= Mark Jeffrey (tennis) =

Australian tennis player

- Country (sports): Australia
- Plays: Right-handed

Singles
- Career record: 0–1
- Highest ranking: No. 373 (4 Aug 1986)

Grand Slam singles results
- Australian Open: Q2 (1985)

Doubles
- Career record: 0–1
- Highest ranking: No. 363 (19 May 1986)

Grand Slam doubles results
- Australian Open: 1R (1985)

Mark Jeffrey (born 1960s) is an Australian former professional tennis player.

Originally from Sydney, Jeffrey featured in the men's doubles main draw of the 1985 Australian Open. After competing briefly on tour he took up a scholarship to Mississippi State University and was an All-American in his freshman year. Named on the All-Southeast Conference team in all four seasons of collegiate tennis, he graduated in 1991 and later moved into coaching. He was head coach of the University of Louisiana men's team from 2009 to 2021.
