= 1988 Nutri-Metics Open – Doubles =

Doubles
- 1988 Nutri-Metics Open
- 1987 Champions: (United States) Anna-Maria Fernandez (New Zealand) Julie Richardson

Final
- Champions: (United States) Patty Fendick (Canada) Jill Hetherington
- Runners-up: (United States) Cammy MacGregor (United States) Cynthia MacGregor
- Score: 6–2, 6–1

Details
- Draw: 24
- Seeds: 8

Events
Singles	Doubles
← 1987 ·	WTA Auckland Open	· 1989 →

Anna-Maria Fernandez and Julie Richardson were the defending champions but they competed with different partners that year, Fernandez with Louise Field and Richardson with Belinda Cordwell.

Cordwell and Richardson lost in the second round to Emmanuelle Derly and Ann Devries.

Fernandez and Field lost in the semifinals to Cammy MacGregor and Cynthia MacGregor.

Patty Fendick and Jill Hetherington won in the final 6–2, 6–1 against the MacGregors.

== Seeds ==
Champion seeds are indicated in bold text while text in italics indicates the round in which those seeds were eliminated. All eight seeded teams received byes into the second round.

1. (United States) Gretchen Magers / (United States) Candy Reynolds (quarterfinals)
2. (Australia) Jenny Byrne / (Australia) Michelle Jaggard (semifinals)
3. (New Zealand) Belinda Cordwell / (New Zealand) Julie Richardson (second round)
4. (United States) **Patty Fendick** / (Canada) **Jill Hetherington (champions)**
5. (United States) Cammy MacGregor / (United States) Cynthia MacGregor (final)
6. (Netherlands) Carin Bakkum / (Netherlands) Marianne van der Torre (quarterfinals)
7. (United States) Anna-Maria Fernandez / (Australia) Louise Field (semifinals)
8. (United States) Lea Antonoplis / (United States) Beverly Bowes (quarterfinals)

== Draw ==
=== Key ===
- Q = Qualifier
- WC = Wild card
- LL = Lucky loser
- Alt = Alternate
- SE = Special exempt
- PR = Protected ranking
- ITF = ITF entry
- JE = Junior exempt
- w/o = Walkover
- r = Retired
- d = Defaulted
- SR = Special ranking

=== Final ===
Final
5	(United States) Cammy MacGregor (United States) Cynthia MacGregor	2	1
4	(United States) **Patty Fendick** (Canada) **Jill Hetherington**	**6**	**6**

=== Top half ===
First round
(United States) S Mascarin (United States) T Phelps	**6**	5	6
(Switzerland) **C Cohen** (Belgium) **S Wasserman**	3	**7**	**7**
(United States) S Savides (United States) E Smith	4	**6**	2
(Japan) **A Nishiya** (Peru) **P Vásquez**	**6**	3	**6**
(France) **E Derly** (Belgium) **A Devries**	**6**	**7**
(United Kingdom) S Gomer (United States) P Smith	3	5
(United States) V Nelson-Dunbar (United States) K Steinmetz	**7**	3	2
(Netherlands) **N Jagerman** (Netherlands) **S Schilder**	6	**6**	**6**

Second round
1	(United States) **G Magers** (United States) **C Reynolds**	**6**	**6**
(Switzerland) C Cohen (Belgium) S Wasserman	2	3
(Japan) A Nishiya (Peru) P Vásquez	4	3
5	(United States) **Ca MacGregor** (United States) **Cy MacGregor**	**6**	**6**
3	(New Zealand) B Cordwell (New Zealand) J Richardson	**6**	4	6
(France) **E Derly** (Belgium) **A Devries**	2	**6**	**7**
(Netherlands) N Jagerman (Netherlands) S Schilder	3	**7**	4
7	(United States) **A M Fernandez** (Australia) **L Field**	**6**	5	**6**

Quarterfinals
1	(United States) G Magers (United States) C Reynolds	**7**	3	2
5	(United States) **Ca MacGregor** (United States) **Cy MacGregor**	5	**6**	**6**
(France) E Derly (Belgium) A Devries	**6**	3	2
7	(United States) **A M Fernandez** (Australia) **L Field**	3	**6**	**6**

Semifinals
5	(United States) **Ca MacGregor** (United States) **Cy MacGregor**	4	**6**	**6**
7	(United States) A M Fernandez (Australia) L Field	**6**	1	1

=== Bottom half ===
First round
(Israel) I Berger (United States) J Thomas	3	3
(Australia) **A Minter** (Australia) **E Minter**	**6**	**6**
(United States) **J Goodling** (United States) **W Wood**	**7**	4	**6**
(United States) P Casale (United States) J Kaplan	5	**6**	4
(United States) **K Adams** (United Kingdom) **J Salmon**	**7**	**7**
(United Kingdom) V Lake (United Kingdom) C Wood	6	5
(New Zealand) R Seeman (New Zealand) C Toleafoa	2	6
(United States) **L Bartlett** (United States) **C Christian**	**6**	**7**

Second round
6	(Netherlands) **C Bakkum** (Netherlands) **M van der Torre**	**6**	2	**6**
(Australia) A Minter (Australia) E Minter	3	**6**	3
(United States) J Goodling (United States) W Wood	1	2
4	(United States) **P Fendick** (Canada) **J Hetherington**	**6**	**6**
8	(United States) **L Antonoplis** (United States) **B Bowes**	**6**	**7**
(United States) K Adams (United Kingdom) J Salmon	2	5
(United States) L Bartlett (United States) C Christian	**6**	3	1
2	(Australia) **J Byrne** (Australia) **M Jaggard**	1	**6**	**6**

Quarterfinals
6	(Netherlands) C Bakkum (Netherlands) M van der Torre	4	1
4	(United States) **P Fendick** (Canada) **J Hetherington**	**6**	**6**
8	(United States) L Antonoplis (United States) B Bowes	4	4
2	(Australia) **J Byrne** (Australia) **M Jaggard**	**6**	**6**

Semifinals
4	(United States) **P Fendick** (Canada) **J Hetherington**	**6**	**6**
2	(Australia) J Byrne (Australia) M Jaggard	0	2
