= 1985 Nutri-Metics Open – Singles =

Singles
- 1985 Nutri-Metics Open

Final
- Champion: (United Kingdom) Anne Hobbs
- Runner-up: (Australia) Louise Field
- Score: 6–3, 6–1

Details
- Draw: 16 (2Q)
- Seeds: 4

Events
Singles	Doubles
- WTA Auckland Open

Susan Hagey was the last tournament winner in 1982. She did not compete this year.

Anne Hobbs won the title by defeating Louise Field 6–3, 6–1 in the final.

== Seeds ==
1. (New Zealand) Belinda Cordwell (first round)
2. (United States) Candy Reynolds (quarterfinals)
3. (United States) Lea Antonoplis (quarterfinals)
4. (United Kingdom) Anne Hobbs (champion)

== Draw ==
Key

- Q = Qualifier
- WC = Wild card
- LL = Lucky loser
- Alt = Alternate
- ITF = ITF entry
- PR = Protected ranking
- SR = Special ranking
- SE = Special exempt
- JE = Junior exempt
- JR = Junior Accelerator Programme entrant
- CO = College Accelerator Programme entrant
- NG = Next Gen Accelerator Program entrant
- w/o = Walkover
- r = Retired
- d = Defaulted

=== Draw ===
First round
1	(New Zealand) B Cordwell	7	4	0
Q	(Australia) S Faulkner	6	6	6
Q	(Australia) M Turk	5	2
(United States) B Norton	7	6
3	(United States) L Antonoplis	6	6
(New Zealand) M Parun	3	2
(United States) C Copeland	3	4
(Australia) L Field	6	6
(United States) M Schillig	2	0
(New Zealand) J Richardson	6	6
(Australia) C Carney	6	2	3
4	(United Kingdom) A Hobbs	3	6	6
(United States) AM Fernandez	6	7	6
(Argentina) A Villagrán	7	6	3
(Switzerland) C Bartos-Cserepy	5	2
2	(United States) C Reynolds	7	6

Quarterfinals
Q	(Australia) S Faulkner	7	4	4
(United States) B Norton	6	6	6
3	(United States) L Antonoplis	5	0
(Australia) L Field	7	6
(New Zealand) J Richardson	0	4
4	(United Kingdom) A Hobbs	6	6
(United States) AM Fernandez	6	7	7
2	(United States) C Reynolds	7	5	6

Semifinals
(United States) B Norton	1	1
(Australia) L Field	6	6
4	(United Kingdom) A Hobbs	7	7
(United States) AM Fernandez	5	6

Final
(Australia) L Field	3	1
4	(United Kingdom) A Hobbs	6	6
