= Susanne Schmid =

Susanne Schmid may refer to:

- Susi Schmid (born 1960), German field hockey player
- Susanne Schmid (tennis) (born 1965), Swiss tennis player

== See also ==
- Susanne Schmidt, German rower
- Suzanne Schmidt, American politician
