= Sean Karam =

Lebanese-Australian tennis player

- Country (sports): Australia; Lebanon
- Born: 24 August 1969 (age 57)

Singles
- Highest ranking: No. 757 (29 Sep 1986)

Grand Slam singles results
- Australian Open: Q2 (1985)

Doubles
- Highest ranking: No. 852 (29 Sep 1986)

Sean Karam (born 24 August 1969) is an Australian former professional tennis player of Lebanese descent.

Karam, who grew up in Sydney, competed on the satellite tour and debuted for the Lebanon Davis Cup team at the age of 27 in 1997. He played in the Davis Cup until 2002 and now works as a tennis coach in Shanghai.
