= Andrea Tiezzi =

Argentine tennis player

- Full name: Andrea Tiezzi Rojas
- Country (sports): Argentina
- Born: 26 November 1964 (age 60)
- Prize money: $55,803

Singles
- Career record: 118–105
- Highest ranking: No. 138 (31 January 1983)

Grand Slam singles results
- French Open: 1R (1988)

Doubles
- Career record: 76–79
- Highest ranking: No. 123 (22 January 1990)

Grand Slam doubles results
- French Open: 2R (1989)
- US Open: 1R (1989)

Andrea Tiezzi Rojas (born 26 November 1964) is an Argentine former professional tennis player.

== Biography ==
Tiezzi, a top-10 junior, played on the professional tour in the 1980s and early 1990s.

At the 1987 Pan American Games in Indianapolis, Tiezzi won silver medals for Argentina in both the women's doubles and mixed doubles events.

She featured once in the singles main draw of a grand slam tournament, as a qualifier at the 1988 French Open.

Her best performance on the WTA Tour was a quarter-final appearance at Guaruja in 1989.

== ITF finals ==
=== Singles (1–5) ===
Result	No.	Date	Tournament	Surface	Opponent	Score
Loss	1.	2 September 1984	Bad Hersfeld, West Germany	Clay	(Czechoslovakia) Lea Plchová	2–6, 0–6
Loss	2.	16 September 1985	Llorca, Spain	Clay	(Netherlands) Hellas ter Riet	6–2, 1–6, 3–6
Loss	3.	10 August 1986	León, Mexico	Clay	(Mexico) Claudia Hernández	0–6, 4–6
Loss	4.	12 October 1986	Medellín, Colombia	Clay	(Brazil) Luciana Corsato-Owsianka	6–3, 5–7, 3–6
Win	1.	29 June 1987	Mexico City, Mexico	Hard	(Netherlands) Carin Bakkum	6–1, 7–5
Loss	5.	15 October 1989	Mobile, United States	Hard	(United States) Jennifer Santrock	3–6, 4–6

=== Doubles (2–11) ===
Result	No.	Date	Tournament	Surface	Partner	Opponents	Score
Loss	1.	25 August 1984	Rheda-Wiedenbrück, West Germany	Clay	(Argentina) Isabelle Villaverde	(Czechoslovakia) Andrea Holíková (Czechoslovakia) Olga Votavová	5–7, 4–6
Loss	2.	1 April 1985	Buenos Aires, Argentina	Clay	(Argentina) Gabriela Mosca	(Argentina) Mariana Pérez Roldán (Argentina) Patricia Tarabini	6–7, 4–6
Loss	3.	27 July 1986	Mexico City, Mexico	Clay	(Argentina) Gabriela Mosca	(United States) Pamela Jung (United States) Judy Newman	6–3, 5–7, 6–7
Loss	4.	28 September 1986	Caracas, Venezuela	Hard	(Argentina) Gabriela Mosca	(United States) Tracie Blumentritt (United States) Brenda Niemeyer	3–6, 6–4, 0–6
Win	1.	12 October 1986	Medellín, Colombia	Clay	(Brazil) Andrea Vieira	(United States) Tracie Blumentritt (United States) Brenda Niemeyer	4–6, 6–0, 6–2
Win	2.	11 May 1987	Lee-on-Solent, United Kingdom	Clay	(United Kingdom) Valda Lake	(Israel) Ilana Berger (Netherlands) Titia Wilmink	6–3, 6–2
Loss	5.	14 September 1987	Medellín, Colombia	Clay	(Chile) Macarena Miranda	(Brazil) Luciana Tella (Brazil) Andrea Vieira	6–4, 5–7, 3–6
Loss	6.	21 September 1987	Lima, Peru	Clay	(Chile) Macarena Miranda	(Brazil) Luciana Tella (Brazil) Andrea Vieira	6–7, 3–6
Loss	7.	28 September 1987	Santiago, Chile	Clay	(Chile) Macarena Miranda	(Switzerland) Michèle Strebel (Uruguay) Patricia Miller	4–6, 2–6
Loss	8.	5 June 1988	Aosta, Italy	Clay	(Argentina) Gabriela Mosca	(United States) Jenni Goodling (United States) Cheryl Jones	2–6, 4–6
Loss	9.	3 July 1989	Vaihingen, West Germany	Clay	(Brazil) Luciana Tella	(West Germany) Anouschka Popp (Hungary) Réka Szikszay	5–7, 4–6
Loss	10.	27 November 1989	Buenos Aires, Argentina	Clay	(Argentina) Florencia Labat	(Argentina) Inés Gorrochategui (Argentina) María Eugenia Vago	3–6, 6–2, 4–6
Loss	11.	16 July 1990	Darmstadt, Germany	Clay	(Netherlands) Simone Schilder	(Soviet Union) Agnese Blumberga (Soviet Union) Eugenia Maniokova	4–6, 4–6
