= 1990 Nutri-Metics International – Doubles =

Doubles
- 1990 Nutri-Metics International

Final
- Champions: (Soviet Union) Natalia Medvedeva (Soviet Union) Leila Meskhi
- Runners-up: (Canada) Jill Hetherington (United States) Robin White
- Score: 3–6, 6–3, 7–6^{(7–3)}

Details
- Draw: 16 (1Q)
- Seeds: 4

Events
Singles	Doubles
- WTA Auckland Open

Patty Fendick and Jill Hetherington were the two-time defending champions, but Fendick did not compete this year.

Hetherington teamed up with Robin White and lost in the final to Natalia Medvedeva and Leila Meskhi. The score was 3–6, 6–3, 7–6^{(7–3)}.

== Seeds ==
1. (Canada) Jill Hetherington / (United States) Robin White (final)
2. (Soviet Union) Natalia Medvedeva / (Soviet Union) Leila Meskhi (champions)
3. (New Zealand) Belinda Cordwell / (West Germany) Eva Pfaff (semifinals)
4. (Australia) Louise Field / (Australia) Janine Tremelling (first round)

== Draw ==
Key

- Q = Qualifier
- WC = Wild card
- LL = Lucky loser
- Alt = Alternate
- ITF = ITF entry
- PR = Protected ranking
- SR = Special ranking
- SE = Special exempt
- JE = Junior exempt
- JR = Junior Accelerator Programme entrant
- CO = College Accelerator Programme entrant
- NG = Next Gen Accelerator Program entrant
- w/o = Walkover
- r = Retired
- d = Defaulted

=== Draw ===
First round
1	(Canada) J Hetherington (United States) R White	7	6
(United States) B Bowes (United States) D Faber	5	3
(Australia) L O'Neill (Netherlands) S Schilder	4	4
(Australia) M Jaggard (New Zealand) J Richardson	6	6
3	(New Zealand) B Cordwell (West Germany) E Pfaff	6	7^{11}
Q	(United States) A Leand (United States) S Stafford	0	6^{9}
(New Zealand) R Seeman (New Zealand) C Toleafoa	6	1	2
(Switzerland) C Cohen (Switzerland) E Krapl	4	6	6
(Australia) T Morton (Australia) R Stubbs	7	6
(Australia) K Radford (Denmark) T Scheuer-Larsen	5	4
(West Germany) W Probst (United Kingdom) C Wood	6	6
4	(Australia) L Field (Australia) J Thompson	3	3
(Finland) P Thorén (Brazil) T Zambrzycki	4	3
(Sweden) M Ekstrand (Denmark) L Vandborg	6	6
(Netherlands) C Bakkum (United Kingdom) J Durie	3	0
2	(Soviet Union) N Medvedeva (Soviet Union) L Meskhi	6	6

Quarterfinals
1	(Canada) J Hetherington (United States) R White	3	6	6
(Australia) M Jaggard (New Zealand) J Richardson	6	3	2
3	(New Zealand) B Cordwell (West Germany) E Pfaff	6	6
(Switzerland) C Cohen (Switzerland) E Krapl	1	3
(Australia) T Morton (Australia) R Stubbs	7	6
(West Germany) W Probst (United Kingdom) C Wood	5	1
(Sweden) M Ekstrand (Denmark) L Vandborg	4	1
2	(Soviet Union) N Medvedeva (Soviet Union) L Meskhi	6	6

Semifinals
1	(Canada) J Hetherington (United States) R White	6	7
3	(New Zealand) B Cordwell (West Germany) E Pfaff	4	5
(Australia) T Morton (Australia) R Stubbs	4	4
2	(Soviet Union) N Medvedeva (Soviet Union) L Meskhi	6	6

Final
1	(Canada) J Hetherington (United States) R White	6	3	6^{3}
2	(Soviet Union) N Medvedeva (Soviet Union) L Meskhi	3	6	7^{7}
