= Gabriela Mosca =

Argentine tennis player

- Country (sports): Argentina
- Born: 12 August 1969 (age 55); San Francisco, Córdoba, Argentina
- Prize money: $49,963

Singles
- Career record: 56–75
- Highest ranking: No. 192 (16 January 1989)

Doubles
- Career record: 43–58
- Highest ranking: No. 90 (1 February 1988)

Grand Slam doubles results
- French Open: 2R (1987)
- Wimbledon: 1R (1987)
- US Open: 2R (1987)

Gabriela Mosca (born 12 August 1969) is an Argentine former professional tennis player.

== Biography ==
Born and raised in San Francisco, Córdoba, Mosca was based in Key Biscayne during her career, moving there at the age of 15. As a junior, she reached as high as second in the ITF rankings.

Mosca competed as a professional player for nine years, with a best singles ranking of 192 in the world. She was a top 100 player in doubles and was featured in the main draw of the women's doubles at the French Open, Wimbledon and the US Open.

She is now living in Buenos Aires and works as a sports-lawyer.

== ITF Circuit finals ==
=== Singles (1–2) ===
$25,000 tournaments
$10,000 tournaments

Result	No.	Date	Tournament	Surface	Opponent	Score
Win	1.	27 July 1986	Mexico City, Mexico	Clay	(Japan) Mayumi Yamada	6–3, 6–3
Loss	1.	26 November 1989	Santiago, Chile	Clay	(Peru) Laura Arraya	3–6, 6–2, 0–6
Loss	2.	29 October 1990	Buenos Aires, Argentina	Clay	(Argentina) Inés Gorrochategui	6–3, 2–6, 4–6

=== Doubles (1–5) ===
Result	No.	Date	Tournament	Surface	Partner	Opponents	Score
Loss	1.	1 April 1985	Buenos Aires, Argentina	Clay	(Argentina) Andrea Tiezzi	(Argentina) Mariana Pérez Roldán (Argentina) Patricia Tarabini	6–7, 4–6
Loss	2.	27 July 1986	Mexico City, Mexico	Clay	(Argentina) Andrea Tiezzi	(United States) Pamela Jung (United States) Judy Newman	6–3, 5–7, 6–7
Loss	3.	28 September 1986	Caracas, Venezuela	Hard	(Argentina) Andrea Tiezzi	(United States) Tracie Blumentritt (United States) Brenda Niemeyer	3–6, 6–4, 0–6
Loss	4.	5 June 1988	Aosta, Italy	Clay	(Argentina) Andrea Tiezzi	(United States) Jenni Goodling (United States) Cheryl Jones	2–6, 4–6
Loss	5.	5 March 1989	Miami, United States	Hard	(Argentina) Patricia Tarabini	(United States) Kathy Foxworth (United States) Tammy Whittington	6–7, 6–7
Win	1.	29 October 1990	Buenos Aires, Argentina	Clay	(Argentina) Inés Gorrochategui	(Argentina) Vanessa Falter (Argentina) Valeria Falter	6–2, 6–0
