= 1990 Nutri-Metics International – Singles =

Singles
- 1990 Nutri-Metics International

Final
- Champion: (Soviet Union) Leila Meskhi
- Runner-up: (Belgium) Sabine Appelmans
- Score: 6–1, 6–0

Details
- Draw: 32 (4Q)
- Seeds: 8

Events
| Singles | Doubles |
- WTA Auckland Open

Patty Fendick was the defending champion, but did not compete this year.

Leila Meskhi won the title by defeating Sabine Appelmans 6–1, 6–0 in the final.

== Seeds ==
1. (New Zealand) Belinda Cordwell (semifinals)
2. (Soviet Union) Leila Meskhi (champion)
3. (United States) Shaun Stafford (first round)
4. (United States) Donna Faber (first round)
5. (Soviet Union) Natalia Medvedeva (first round)
6. (Belgium) Sandra Wasserman (quarterfinals)
7. (West Germany) Wiltrud Probst (first round)
8. (United States) Robin White (semifinals)

== Draw ==
Key

- Q = Qualifier
- WC = Wild card
- LL = Lucky loser
- Alt = Alternate
- ITF = ITF entry
- PR = Protected ranking
- SR = Special ranking
- SE = Special exempt
- JE = Junior exempt
- JR = Junior Accelerator Programme entrant
- CO = College Accelerator Programme entrant
- NG = Next Gen Accelerator Program entrant
- w/o = Walkover
- r = Retired
- d = Defaulted

=== Finals ===
Semifinals
1 | (New Zealand) Belinda Cordwell | 1 | 2
(Belgium) Sabine Appelmans | 6 | 6
8 | (United States) Robin White | 4 | 2
2 | (Soviet Union) Leila Meskhi | 6 | 6

Final
(Belgium) Sabine Appelmans | 1 | 0
2 | (Soviet Union) Leila Meskhi | 6 | 6

=== Top half ===
First round
1 | (New Zealand) B Cordwell | 6 | 6
(Australia) J Tremelling | 3 | 0
Q | (Australia) L O'Neill | 6 | 3 | 6
(Canada) M Drake | 3 | 6 | 1
(United States) B Bowes | 6 | 6
(Denmark) T Scheuer-Larsen | 4 | 1
Q | (Australia) K Godridge | 6 | 6 | 6
5 | (Soviet Union) N Medvedeva | 2 | 7 | 2
3 | (United States) S Stafford | 3 | 4
(Switzerland) E Krapl | 6 | 6
(United States) A Leand | 2 | 6 | 6
(West Germany) E Pfaff | 6 | 3 | 2
(New Zealand) C Toleafoa | 7 | 6
(Switzerland) E Zardo | 6 | 1
(Belgium) S Appelmans | 4 | 6 | 6
7 | (West Germany) W Probst | 6 | 4 | 2

Second round
1 | (New Zealand) B Cordwell | 1 | 6 | 6
Q | (Australia) L O'Neill | 6 | 1 | 1
(United States) B Bowes | 6 | 3 | 7
Q | (Australia) K Godridge | 4 | 6 | 6
(Switzerland) E Krapl | 3 | 6 | 0
(United States) A Leand | 6 | 3 | 6
(New Zealand) C Toleafoa | 3 | 6 | 2
(Belgium) S Appelmans | 6 | 3 | 6

Quarterfinals
1 | (New Zealand) B Cordwell | 1 | 7 | 7
(United States) B Bowes | 6 | 6 | 5
(United States) A Leand | 3 | 3
(Belgium) S Appelmans | 6 | 6

Semifinals
1 | (New Zealand) B Cordwell | 1 | 2
(Belgium) S Appelmans | 6 | 6

=== Bottom half ===
First round
8 | (United States) R White | 4
(Belgium) A Devries | 0 | r
Q | (Sweden) M Ekstrand | 6 | 2
Q | (United Kingdom) C Wood | 7 | 6
(Finland) P Thorén | 2 | 5
(Australia) M Jaggard | 6 | 7
(United Kingdom) J Durie | 6 | 6
4 | (United States) D Faber | 1 | 3
6 | (Belgium) S Wasserman | 6 | 6
(Australia) K Radford | 1 | 1
(Australia) L Field | 6 | 4 | 6
(Switzerland) C Cohen | 1 | 6 | 1
(Canada) J Hetherington | 3 | 4
(New Zealand) J Richardson | 6 | 6
(Italy) F Bonsignori | 1 | 2
2 | (Soviet Union) L Meskhi | 6 | 6

Second round
8 | (United States) R White | 6 | 6
Q | (United Kingdom) C Wood | 4 | 0
(Australia) M Jaggard | 4 | 2
(United Kingdom) J Durie | 6 | 6
6 | (Belgium) S Wasserman | 3 | 6 | 6
(Australia) L Field | 6 | 4 | 2
(New Zealand) J Richardson | 2 | 1
2 | (Soviet Union) L Meskhi | 6 | 6

Quarterfinals
8 | (United States) R White | 6 | 6
(United Kingdom) J Durie | 2 | 4
6 | (Belgium) S Wasserman | 0 | 2
2 | (Soviet Union) L Meskhi | 6 | 6

Semifinals
8 | (United States) R White | 4 | 2
2 | (Soviet Union) L Meskhi | 6 | 6
