= Hatem McDadi =

Canadian tennis player

- Country (sports): Canada

Singles
- Career record: 0–6
- Highest ranking: No. 226 (Dec 16, 1985)

Grand Slam singles results
- Australian Open: Q2 (1985)

Doubles
- Career record: 0–4
- Highest ranking: No. 188 (Dec 9, 1985)

Hatem McDadi (born 1960s) is a Canadian former professional tennis player.

Of Lebanese descent, the McDadi surname is the result of a translation attempt by a customs official when his father emigrated. He grew up in Mississauga and has an elder brother Sam who is a prominent real estate agent in Greater Toronto. Active on tour in the 1980s, McDadi had a best singles world ranking of 226 and ranked in the top 10 nationally. He is now the Senior Vice-president of High-Performance at Tennis Canada.
