= Susanne Schmid (tennis) =

Swiss tennis player

- Full name: Susanne Schmid Lanz
- Country (sports): Switzerland
- Born: 27 March 1965 (age 60)
- Plays: Left-handed
- Prize money: $14,695

Singles

Grand Slam singles results
- Australian Open: Q1 (1984)
- French Open: 1R (1985)

Susanne Schmid Lanz (born 27 March 1965) is a Swiss former professional tennis player.

A left-handed player from Lucerne, Schmid was a French Open junior quarter-finalist and played on the professional tour in the 1980s. Her WTA Tour main draw appearances included an upset win over world number 37 Sabrina Goleš at the 1984 European Indoors. In 1985 she featured in the women's singles main draw at Roland Garros for the only time and lost a close first round match to Anne White, 7–9 in the third set.

Schmid retired at the age of 21 and is married to Guido Lanz. She has two daughters, Michelle and Joëlle, who both played tennis at junior level.
