= Steve Furlong =

Australian tennis player

- Full name: Stephen Furlong
- Country (sports): Australia
- Born: 10 January 1967 (age 58); London, England
- Height: 185 cm (6 ft 1 in)
- Plays: Right-handed
- Prize money: $11,794

Singles
- Career record: 1–2
- Highest ranking: No. 355 (3 August 1987)

Doubles
- Career record: 0–3
- Highest ranking: No. 229 (14 August 1989)

Grand Slam doubles results
- Australian Open: 1R (1985, 1987)

Stephen Furlong (born 10 January 1967) is a former professional tennis player from Australia.

== Biography ==
=== Early life ===
Furlong, who was born in London, grew up in Sydney and attended Narrabeen Sports High School. At the age of 16 he joined the Australian Institute of Sport in Canberra as one of the top juniors in the country.

=== Tennis career ===
A right-handed player, Furlong was runner-up to Shane Barr at the 1985 Australian Open boys' singles. His only win on the Grand Prix circuit came against Barr, at the 1986 Sydney Indoor, where he saved a match point in a second set tiebreak. He also competed on the Challenger tour and was a losing finalist to Laurie Warder at the 1988 Brisbane Challenger event. All of his main draw appearances at grand slam level were in doubles. He featured twice in the men's doubles at the Australian Open and also appeared in the mixed doubles at the 1989 Wimbledon Championships, where he made the second round with Kristine Radford.
