= 1985 Australian Open – Men's singles =

Men's singles
- 1985 Australian Open

Final
- Champion: (Sweden) Stefan Edberg
- Runner-up: (Sweden) Mats Wilander
- Score: 6–4, 6–3, 6–3

Details
- Draw: 96
- Seeds: 16

Events
Singles	men	women		boys	girls
Doubles	men	women	mixed	boys	girls
WC Singles	men	women	quad
WC Doubles	men	women	quad
Legends	men	women	mixed
- Australian Open

Stefan Edberg defeated two-time defending champion Mats Wilander in the final, 6–4, 6–3, 6–3 to win the men's singles tennis title at the 1985 Australian Open. It was his first major singles title. Edberg saved two match points en route to the title, against Wally Masur in the fourth round. Edberg was 19 years, 10 months and 19 days when he won his first major title.

This event marked the first time in Australian Open history that no Australian was among the top 16 seeds, and that no Australian reached the quarterfinals.

== Seeds ==
The seeded players are listed below. Stefan Edberg is the champion; others show the round in which they were eliminated.

1. (Czechoslovakia) Ivan Lendl (semifinals)
2. (United States) John McEnroe (quarterfinals)
3. (Sweden) Mats Wilander (final)
4. (West Germany) Boris Becker (second round)
5. (Sweden) Stefan Edberg (champion)
6. (United States) Johan Kriek (quarterfinals)
7. (Sweden) Joakim Nyström (fourth round)
8. (United States) Tim Mayotte (fourth round)
9. (United States) Scott Davis (second round)
10. (United States) Brad Gilbert (third round)
11. (Czechoslovakia) Tomáš Šmíd (second round)
12. (United States) Paul Annacone (third round)
13. (France) Henri Leconte (fourth round)
14. (Sweden) Henrik Sundström (second round)
15. (United States) David Pate (second round)
16. (United States) Greg Holmes (second round)

== Draw ==
=== Key ===
- Q = Qualifier
- WC = Wild card
- LL = Lucky loser
- r = Retired

=== Finals ===
Quarterfinals
1	(Czechoslovakia) Ivan Lendl	7	6	6
(United Kingdom) John Lloyd	6	2	1
(Netherlands) Michiel Schapers	0	5	4
5	(Sweden) Stefan Edberg	6	7	6
6	(United States) Johan Kriek	3	5	2
3	(Sweden) Mats Wilander	6	7	6
(Socialist Federal Republic of Yugoslavia) Slobodan Živojinović	2	6	1	6	6
2	(United States) John McEnroe	6	3	6	4	0

Semifinals
1	(Czechoslovakia) Ivan Lendl	7	5	1	6	7
5	(Sweden) Stefan Edberg	6	7	6	4	9
3	(Sweden) Mats Wilander	7	6	6
(Socialist Federal Republic of Yugoslavia) Slobodan Živojinović	5	1	3

Final
5	(Sweden) Stefan Edberg	6	6	6
3	(Sweden) Mats Wilander	4	3	3

=== Top half ===
==== Section 1 ====
First round
(United States) B Testerman	7	6	7
Q	(United States) T Cain	6	3	6
(New Zealand) K Evernden	6	2	6	6	13
(United States) B Teacher	7	6	4	3	15
(South Africa) C Steyn	6	6	6
Q	(New Zealand) B Derlin	4	3	3
(West Germany) R Osterthun	2	0	7	7	6
Q	(Australia) L Warder	6	6	5	6	8

Second round
1	(Czechoslovakia) I Lendl	6	0	6	6
(Mexico) L Lavalle	4	6	4	2
(United States) B Testerman	6	6	7	7
(United States) B Teacher	1	7	6	6
(South Africa) C Steyn	6	3	6	6
Q	(Australia) L Warder	4	6	3	2
(Israel) S Perkiss	3	3	6
10	(United States) B Gilbert	6	6	7

Third round
1	(Czechoslovakia) I Lendl	6	1	6	6
(United States) B Testerman	3	6	3	2
(South Africa) C Steyn	2	6	6	7
10	(United States) B Gilbert	6	4	4	5

Fourth round
1	(Czechoslovakia) I Lendl	6	6	6	6
(South Africa) C Steyn	3	2	7	2

==== Section 2 ====
First round
(United States) G Layendecker	3	4	7	6	3
Q	(United States) S Denton	6	6	5	3	6
LL	(Australia) C Limberger	4	2	4
(Switzerland) J Hlasek	6	6	6
(Canada) S Bonneau	4	4	6
(Australia) J Frawley	6	6	7
(Australia) M Edmondson	1	3	5
(United States) L Bourne	6	6	7

Second round
11	(Czechoslovakia) T Šmid	5	7	6	3
(United Kingdom) J Lloyd	7	6	7	6
Q	(United States) S Denton	4	7	5	4
(Switzerland) J Hlasek	6	5	7	6
(Australia) J Frawley	2	6	6	6	10
(United States) L Bourne	6	7	2	1	8
(United States) S Giammalva Jr.	3	2	7	4
7	(Sweden) J Nyström	6	6	5	6

Third round
(United Kingdom) J Lloyd	6	6	6
(Switzerland) J Hlasek	3	4	3
(Australia) J Frawley	6	5	3	4
7	(Sweden) J Nyström	4	7	6	6

Fourth round
(United Kingdom) J Lloyd	6	1	6	6	6
7	(Sweden) J Nyström	2	6	4	7	4

==== Section 3 ====
First round
(West Germany) W Popp	1	7	3	6	3
(Netherlands) M Schapers	6	6	6	1	6
(Netherlands) H van Boeckel	7
(United Kingdom) C Dowdeswell	5	r
(United States) M Mitchell	6	3	6	3	2
(New Zealand) C Lewis	2	6	1	6	6
(France) T Benhabiles	4	4	6	2
(Australia) D Cahill	6	6	4	6

Second round
4	(West Germany) B Becker	6	4	6	6	3
(Netherlands) M Schapers	3	6	7	4	6
(Netherlands) H van Boeckel	7	6	6
(Brazil) N Aerts	5	3	3
(New Zealand) C Lewis	6	2	4	4
(United States) T Gullikson	4	6	6	6
(Australia) D Cahill	3	7	6	6
15	(United States) D Pate	6	6	3	0

Third round
(Netherlands) M Schapers	6	6	7
(Netherlands) H van Boeckel	2	4	6
(United States) T Gullikson	6	6	3	6
(Australia) D Cahill	4	3	6	4

Fourth round
(Netherlands) M Schapers	7
(United States) T Gullikson	6	r

==== Section 4 ====
First round
(Australia) S Youl	7	7	6	6
WC	(Australia) J Alexander	6	6	7	3
(Netherlands) M Oosting	7	3	0
(Australia) W Masur	6	6	6
(Israel) S Glickstein	6	7	7
Q	(United Kingdom) S Bale	3	6	6
(United States) B Schultz	6	7	6
Q	(Australia) CA Miller	4	6	2

Second round
14	(Sweden) H Sundström	2	2	3
Q	(Australia) B Dyke	6	6	6
(Australia) S Youl	3	4	6	4
(Australia) W Masur	6	6	3	6
(Israel) S Glickstein	2	1	7	2
(United States) M Anger	6	6	5	6
(United States) B Schultz	3	4	6
5	(Sweden) S Edberg	6	6	7

Third round
Q	(Australia) B Dyke	6	3	2	2
(Australia) W Masur	4	6	6	6
(United States) M Anger	7	6	4	5
5	(Sweden) S Edberg	5	7	6	7

Fourth round
(Australia) W Masur	7	6	6	4	2
5	(Sweden) S Edberg	6	2	7	6	6

=== Bottom half ===
==== Section 5 ====
First round
Q	(Australia) R Rasheed	4	1	3
Q	(United States) T Nelson	6	6	6
(Australia) P Doohan	6	6	6
LL	(Soviet Union) A Chesnokov	0	1	2
(Republic of Ireland) M Doyle	0	4	6	7	3
(United States) J Lapidus	6	6	1	6	6
WC	(Australia) M Woodforde	7	6	3	6
LL	(South Africa) E Edwards	6	4	6	4

Second round
6	(United States) J Kriek	6	4	6	6
LL	(Australia) D Mustard	4	6	3	4
Q	(United States) T Nelson	4	6	1
(Australia) P Doohan	6	7	6
WC	(Australia) P Thrupp	6	4	6
(United States) J Lapidus	7	6	7
WC	(Australia) M Woodforde	1	6	6	6
16	(United States) G Holmes	6	1	4	2

Third round
6	(United States) J Kriek	7	6	6
(Australia) P Doohan	5	4	0
(United States) J Lapidus	6	6	6	2	7
WC	(Australia) M Woodforde	7	3	4	6	5

Fourth round
6	(United States) J Kriek	6	6	6
(United States) J Lapidus	3	4	3

==== Section 6 ====
First round
(United States) M Leach	7	7	5	3	6
(United States) J Canter	5	6	7	6	4
(United States) T Wilkison	6	6	6
Q	(Soviet Union) A Zverev	2	3	0
(United States) M Flur	6	6	7	6
(United Kingdom) J Bates	7	7	5	4
(United States) L Shiras	6	1	6	6
(France) G Forget	4	6	3	2

Second round
12	(United States) P Annacone	6	7	6	7
(United States) B Green	7	6	4	5
(United States) M Leach	4	0	2
(United States) T Wilkison	6	6	6
(United States) M Flur	6	6	4	0	7
(United States) L Shiras	4	1	6	6	9
Q	(South Africa) G Muller	6	3	6	4
3	(Sweden) M Wilander	3	6	7	6

Third round
12	(United States) P Annacone	5	3	3
(United States) T Wilkison	7	6	6
(United States) L Shiras	2	3	2
3	(Sweden) M Wilander	6	6	6

Fourth round
(United States) T Wilkison	6	3	3
3	(Sweden) M Wilander	7	6	6

==== Section 7 ====
First round
(United States) M Bauer	6	2	6
(United States) M Dickson	7	6	7
(Paraguay) F González	6	6	6
(Sweden) J Svensson	2	4	2
(United States) M De Palmer	7	6	4	5	14
(Australia) J Fitzgerald	5	4	6	7	12
(West Germany) D Keretić	6	2
(United Kingdom) S Shaw	2	1^{r}

Second round
8	(United States) T Mayotte	6	6	6
(United States) M Dickson	4	4	4
(Paraguay) F González	6	6	4	5
(Argentina) R Saad	1	7	6	7
(United States) M De Palmer	6	6	7	7
(West Germany) D Keretić	1	7	6	6
(Socialist Federal Republic of Yugoslavia) S Živojinović	7	3	6	6
9	(United States) S Davis	5	6	1	3

Third round
8	(United States) T Mayotte	7	6	6	6
(Argentina) R Saad	6	7	4	4
(United States) M De Palmer	7	3	2	2
(Socialist Federal Republic of Yugoslavia) S Živojinović	6	6	6	6

Fourth round
8	(United States) T Mayotte	6	4	4	4
(Socialist Federal Republic of Yugoslavia) S Živojinović	2	6	6	6

==== Section 8 ====
First round
(Israel) A Mansdorf	6	6	6	6	6
WC	(Australia) P McNamara	7	7	2	4	4
(Australia) B Drewett	7	6	7
(United States) M Wooldridge	6	3	6
(Nigeria) N Odizor	7	7	6
WC	(Australia) D Macpherson	6	6	1
(United States) B Scanlon	6	6	0	6	6
(South Africa) D Visser	4	7	6	2	8

Second round
13	(France) H Leconte	6	6	7
(Israel) A Mansdorf	4	2	5
(United States) J Sadri	6	7	7	6
(Australia) B Drewett	7	6	6	3
(United States) D Cassidy	4	3	6	4
(Nigeria) N Odizor	6	6	3	6
(South Africa) D Visser	4	3	6	3
2	(United States) J McEnroe	6	6	3	6

Third round
13	(France) H Leconte	7	6	7
(United States) J Sadri	6	3	6
(Nigeria) N Odizor	6	2	4	2
2	(United States) J McEnroe	4	6	6	6

Fourth round
13	(France) H Leconte	7	6	6	6	1
2	(United States) J McEnroe	5	7	3	7	6

Preceded by 1985 US Open	Grand Slam men's singles	Succeeded by 1986 French Open
