= 1985 Australian Open – Women's doubles =

Women's doubles
- 1985 Australian Open

Final
- Champions: (United States) Martina Navratilova (United States) Pam Shriver
- Runners-up: (West Germany) Claudia Kohde-Kilsch (Czechoslovakia) Helena Suková
- Score: 6–3, 6–4

Details
- Draw: 32
- Seeds: 8

Events
Singles	men	women		boys	girls
Doubles	men	women	mixed	boys	girls
WC Singles	men	women	quad
WC Doubles	men	women	quad
Legends	men	women	mixed
- Australian Open

Three-time defending champions Martina Navratilova and Pam Shriver successfully defended their title, defeating Claudia Kohde-Kilsch and Helena Suková in the final, 6–3, 6–4 to win the women's doubles tennis title at the 1985 Australian Open.

== Seeds ==
Champion seeds are indicated in bold text while text in italics indicates the round in which those seeds were eliminated.

1. (United States) **Martina Navratilova** / (United States) **Pam Shriver (champions)**
2. (West Germany) Claudia Kohde-Kilsch / (Czechoslovakia) Helena Suková (final)
3. (Czechoslovakia) Hana Mandlíková / (Australia) Wendy Turnbull (second round)
4. (United States) Barbara Potter / (United States) Sharon Walsh-Pete (semifinals)
5. (United States) Elise Burgin / (Australia) Elizabeth Smylie (second round)
6. (United States) Gigi Fernández / (United States) Robin White (second round)
7. (South Africa) Rosalyn Fairbank / (United States) Candy Reynolds (second round)
8. (Bulgaria) Katerina Maleeva / (Bulgaria) Manuela Maleeva (second round)

== Draw ==
Key

- Q = Qualifier
- WC = Wild card
- LL = Lucky loser
- Alt = Alternate
- ITF = ITF entry
- PR = Protected ranking
- SR = Special ranking
- SE = Special exempt
- JE = Junior exempt
- JR = Junior Accelerator Programme entrant
- CO = College Accelerator Programme entrant
- NG = Next Gen Accelerator Program entrant
- w/o = Walkover
- r = Retired
- d = Defaulted

=== Final ===
Final
1	(United States) **Martina Navratilova** (United States) **Pam Shriver**	**6**	**6**
2	(West Germany) Claudia Kohde-Kilsch (Czechoslovakia) Helena Suková	3	4

=== Top half ===
First round
1	(United States) **M Navratilova** (United States) **P Shriver**	**6**	**6**
(Australia) L Field (Australia) M Turk	2	1
(Sweden) C Karlsson (Sweden) M Lindström	4	4
(Australia) **J Byrne** (Australia) **J Tremelling**	**6**	**6**
(Netherlands) **M Mesker** (France) **P Paradis**	**7^{7}**	**6**
Q	(West Germany) A Betzner (West Germany) M Schropp	6^{1}	1
(France) S Amiach (United States) B Gerken	1	**6**	3
5	(United States) **E Burgin** (Australia) **E Smylie**	**6**	3	**6**
3	(Czechoslovakia) **H Mandlíková** (Australia) **W Turnbull**	**6**	**7^{7}**
(United States) L McNeil (France) C Suire	2	6^{3}
(New Zealand) B Cordwell (New Zealand) J Richardson	2	**6**	3
(United States) **C Evert-Lloyd** (Sweden) **C Lindqvist**	**6**	1	**6**
(United Kingdom) **J Durie** (United Kingdom) **A Hobbs**	**7^{7}**	**6**
(United Kingdom) A Brown (United Kingdom) S Gomer	6^{1}	2
(United States) B Nagelsen (United States) P Smith	6^{5}	3
7	(South Africa) **R Fairbank** (United States) **C Reynolds**	**7^{7}**	**6**

Second round
1	(United States) **M Navratilova** (United States) **P Shriver**	**7^{7}**	4	**6**
(Australia) J Byrne (Australia) J Tremelling	6^{5}	**6**	3
(Netherlands) **M Mesker** (France) **P Paradis**	2	**6**	**6**
5	(United States) E Burgin (Australia) E Smylie	**6**	4	3
3	(Czechoslovakia) H Mandlíková (Australia) W Turnbull	3	6^{6}
(United States) **C Evert-Lloyd** (Sweden) **C Lindqvist**	**6**	**7^{8}**
(United Kingdom) **J Durie** (United Kingdom) **A Hobbs**	**6**	**6**
7	(South Africa) R Fairbank (United States) C Reynolds	1	3

Quarterfinals
1	(United States) **M Navratilova** (United States) **P Shriver**	**6**	**6**
(Netherlands) M Mesker (France) P Paradis	4	2
(United States) C Evert-Lloyd (Sweden) C Lindqvist	4	1
(United Kingdom) **J Durie** (United Kingdom) **A Hobbs**	**6**	**6**

Semifinals
1	(United States) **M Navratilova** (United States) **P Shriver**	**7^{7}**	**6**
(United Kingdom) J Durie (United Kingdom) A Hobbs	6^{4}	2

=== Bottom half ===
First round
6	(United States) **G Fernández** (United States) **R White**	**6**	**7^{7}**
(Australia) A Minter (Australia) E Minter	1	6^{5}
(United States) **Z Garrison** (United Kingdom) **V Wade**	6^{6}	**6**	**6**
Q	(Australia) A Gulley (Australia) A Tobin-Dingwall	**7^{8}**	3	3
(United States) **L Bonder** (United Kingdom) **A Croft**	**7**	**7^{7}**
(United States) L Antonoplis (United States) A M Fernandez	5	6^{5}
(Australia) S Leo (Australia) P Whytcross	**6**	2	1
4	(United States) **B Potter** (United States) **S Walsh-Pete**	3	**6**	**6**
8	(Bulgaria) **K Maleeva** (Bulgaria) **M Maleeva**	**6**	**6**
(Czechoslovakia) A Holíková (Czechoslovakia) K Skronská	3	4
(United States) **L Gates** (United States) **A Moulton**	**6**	4	**6**
(United States) A Henricksson (Switzerland) C Jolissaint	4	**6**	3
(United States) **T Holladay** (United States) **H Ludloff**	**6**	5	**6**
(United States) C Benjamin (United States) M Van Nostrand	4	**7**	3
(United States) H Crowe (United States) K Steinmetz	2	1
2	(West Germany) **C Kohde-Kilsch** (Czechoslovakia) **H Suková**	**6**	**6**

Second round
6	(United States) G Fernández (United States) R White	6^{4}	**6**	5
(United States) **Z Garrison** (United Kingdom) **V Wade**	**7^{7}**	4	**7**
(United States) L Bonder (United Kingdom) A Croft	3	4
4	(United States) **B Potter** (United States) **S Walsh-Pete**	**6**	**6**
8	(Bulgaria) K Maleeva (Bulgaria) M Maleeva	**6**	2	11
(United States) **L Gates** (United States) **A Moulton**	4	**6**	**13**
(United States) T Holladay (United States) H Ludloff	**7^{7}**	2	3
2	(West Germany) **C Kohde-Kilsch** (Czechoslovakia) **H Suková**	6^{3}	**6**	**6**

Quarterfinals
(United States) Z Garrison (United Kingdom) V Wade	3	**6**	3
4	(United States) **B Potter** (United States) **S Walsh-Pete**	**6**	3	**6**
(United States) L Gates (United States) A Moulton	4	4	r
2	(West Germany) **C Kohde-Kilsch** (Czechoslovakia) **H Suková**	**6**	**5**

Semifinals
4	(United States) B Potter (United States) S Walsh-Pete	**6**	4	1
2	(West Germany) **C Kohde-Kilsch** (Czechoslovakia) **H Suková**	3	**6**	**6**
