= Judy Newman =

American tennis player

- Full name: Judy Newman Rakela
- Country (sports): United States
- Born: May 11, 1962 (age 62)

Singles
- Highest ranking: No. 393 (Apr 27, 1987)

Grand Slam singles results
- Australian Open: Q1 (1988)

Doubles
- Career titles: 1 ITF
- Highest ranking: No. 251 (Dec 21, 1986)

Judy Newman Rakela (born May 11, 1962) is an American former professional tennis player.

A native of Santa Cruz, Newman was the second born of four children and attended Harbor High School. She studied at the University of San Diego on a tennis scholarship and played on tour after graduating in 1984.

Newman competed on the professional circuit until 1990, featuring on the WTA Tour and in grand slam qualifying.

Following her time on tour she earned a master's degree in sports psychology at John F. Kennedy University and plays on the ITF Senior circuit, where she has represented her country in World Championships.

== ITF finals ==
=== Doubles: 1 (1–0) ===
Outcome	No.	Date	Tournament	Surface	Partner	Opponents	Score
Winner	1.	Jul 1986	Mexico City, Mexico	Clay	(United States) Pamela Jung	(Argentina) Gabriela Mosca (Argentina) Andrea Tiezzi	3–6, 7–5, 7–6
