= 1987 Nutri-Metics Open =

- Date: 26 January – 1 February
- Edition: 2nd
- Category: Category 1
- Draw: 56S / 24D
- Prize money: $50,000
- Surface: Hard / outdoor
- Location: Auckland, New Zealand
- Venue: ASB Tennis Centre

Champions

Singles
- (United States) Gretchen Magers

Doubles
- (United States) Anna-Maria Fernandez (Australia) Julie Richardson
- WTA Auckland Open

The 1987 Nutri-Metics Open was a women's tennis tournament played on outdoor hard courts at the ASB Tennis Centre in Auckland in New Zealand and was part of the Category 1 tier of the 1987 Virginia Slims World Championship Series. It was the second edition of the tournament and ran from 26 January until 1 February 1987. Gretchen Magers won the singles title.

== Finals ==
=== Singles ===
(United States) Gretchen Magers defeated (United States) Terry Phelps 6–2, 6–3

- It was Magers' 1st singles title of her career.

=== Doubles ===
(United States) Anna-Maria Fernandez / (Australia) Julie Richardson defeated (United States) Gretchen Magers / (Australia) Elizabeth Minter 4–6, 6–4, 6–2

== See also ==
- 1987 Benson and Hedges Open – men's tournament
