= Gail Falkenberg =

American tennis player (born 1947)

- Country (sports): United States
- Born: January 16, 1947 (age 79)
- Turned pro: 1985
- Plays: Right-handed
- College: UCLA (fl. 1967)
- Prize money: US$ 10,830

Singles
- Highest ranking: No. 360 (Dec 7, 1987)

Grand Slam singles results
- Australian Open: Q2 (1988)

Doubles
- Highest ranking: No. 430 (Feb 2, 1987)

Gail Falkenberg (born January 16, 1947) is an American professional tennis player. Possibly the oldest tournament tennis player of all time, she has competed in ITF Women's World Tennis Tour tournaments as recently as 2026, aged 79.

Raised in Westfield, New Jersey, Falkenberg attended University of California, Los Angeles in the 1960s, where she played on the basketball, tennis and volleyball varsity teams and earned undergraduate and graduate degrees in filmmaking.

After graduation she worked as a documentary filmmaker and didn't join the professional tour until she was 38 years of age. She made her Virginia Slims main draw debut at the 1986 Brazilian Open and featured in qualifying at the 1988 Australian Open. Retiring from full-time tennis in 1990, she achieved a career high singles world ranking of 360.

During the 1990s she was the men's and women's tennis head coach at the University of Central Florida and even had a season in charge of the women's basketball team as an acting coach.

Falkenberg has continued to compete on and off in ITF tournaments since the 1990s. In 2013, as a 66-year old, she came up against Naomi Osaka in the qualifying draw for the Rock Hill ITF event. Osaka, 50 years her junior, won 6–0, 6–0. She defeated 22-year-old Rosalyn Small 6–0, 6–1 in the first qualifying round in Alabama in 2016 then she also played against former world's number one junior Taylor Townsend, which received considerable media attention. Townsend conceded only 12 points to her 69-year old opponent.
