= 1985 Australian Open – Men's doubles =

Men's doubles
- 1985 Australian Open

Final
- Champion: (United States) Paul Annacone (South Africa) Christo van Rensburg
- Runner-up: (Australia) Mark Edmondson (Australia) Kim Warwick
- Score: 3–6, 7–6, 6–4, 6–4

Details
- Draw: 48
- Seeds: 16

Events
Singles	men	women		boys	girls
Doubles	men	women	mixed	boys	girls
WC Singles	men	women	quad
WC Doubles	men	women	quad
Legends	men	women	mixed
- Australian Open

The men's doubles tournament at the 1985 Australian Open was held from 25 November through 8 December 1985 on the outdoor grass courts at the Kooyong Stadium in Melbourne, Australia. Paul Annacone and Christo van Rensburg won the title, defeating Mark Edmondson and Kim Warwick in the final.

== Seeds ==
1. (Sweden) Joakim Nyström / (Sweden) Mats Wilander (semifinals)
2. (United States) Paul Annacone / (South Africa) Christo van Rensburg (champions)
3. (Australia) John Fitzgerald / (Czechoslovakia) Tomáš Šmíd (second round)
4. (Australia) Mark Edmondson / (Australia) Kim Warwick (final)
5. (Sweden) Stefan Edberg / (France) Guy Forget (second round)
6. (United States) Scott Davis / (United States) David Pate (second round)
7. (United States) Steve Denton / (United States) Sherwood Stewart (third round)
8. (United States) Mike De Palmer / (Australia) Peter Doohan (third round)
9. (West Germany) Boris Becker / (Socialist Federal Republic of Yugoslavia) Slobodan Živojinović (quarterfinals)
10. (Israel) Shlomo Glickstein / (Israel) Shahar Perkiss (second round)
11. (Australia) Broderick Dyke / (Australia) Michael Fancutt (second round)
12. (United Kingdom) Colin Dowdeswell / (United Kingdom) John Lloyd (third round)
13. (United States) Mark Dickson / (United States) Tim Wilkison (quarterfinals)
14. (South Africa) Eddie Edwards / (South Africa) Danie Visser (second round)
15. (United States) Mike Leach / (Nigeria) Nduka Odizor (second round)
16. (Australia) Brad Drewett / (United States) Matt Mitchell (third round)

== Draw ==
Key

- Q = Qualifier
- WC = Wild card
- LL = Lucky loser
- Alt = Alternate
- ITF = ITF entry
- PR = Protected ranking
- SR = Special ranking
- SE = Special exempt
- JE = Junior exempt
- JR = Junior Accelerator Programme entrant
- CO = College Accelerator Programme entrant
- NG = Next Gen Accelerator Program entrant
- w/o = Walkover
- r = Retired
- d = Defaulted

=== Finals ===
Quarterfinals
1	(Sweden) Joakim Nyström (Sweden) Mats Wilander	6	6	7
13	(United States) Mark Dickson (United States) Tim Wilkison	3	4	6
4	(Australia) Mark Edmondson (Australia) Kim Warwick	3	6	7	6
(Australia) Antony Emerson (Australia) Des Tyson	6	3	5	4
(Australia) Craig Miller (Australia) Laurie Warder	7	7	6
(United States) John Letts (South Africa) Michael Robertson	6	5	2
9	(West Germany) Boris Becker (Socialist Federal Republic of Yugoslavia) Slobodan Živojinović	6	6	7	6	7
2	(United States) Paul Annacone (South Africa) Christo van Rensburg	4	7	5	7	9

Semifinals
1	(Sweden) Joakim Nyström (Sweden) Mats Wilander	5	6	5	6	3
4	(Australia) Mark Edmondson (Australia) Kim Warwick	7	4	7	4	6
(Australia) Craig Miller (Australia) Laurie Warder	5	6	4
2	(United States) Paul Annacone (South Africa) Christo van Rensburg	7	7	6

Final
4	(Australia) Mark Edmondson (Australia) Kim Warwick	6	6	4	4
2	(United States) Paul Annacone (South Africa) Christo van Rensburg	3	7	6	6

=== Top half ===
==== Section 1 ====
First round
(United States) M Bauer (United States) L Bourne	7	6
(Australia) J Alexander (Australia) M Woodforde	6	2
(Australia) B Custer (Australia) D Macpherson	6	7	6
(Nigeria) T Mmoh (Switzerland) D Utzinger	7	6	3
(United Kingdom) S Shaw (South Africa) C Steyn	7	6
(Sweden) P Carlsson (Sweden) J Svensson	5	3
(United States) J Arons (United States) G Layendecker	6	1	5
(United States) J Canter (Mexico) L Lavalle	1	6	7

Second round
1	(Sweden) J Nyström (Sweden) M Wilander	6	6
(United States) M Bauer (United States) L Bourne	4	1
(Australia) B Custer (Australia) D Macpherson	6	7	6
10	(Israel) S Glickstein (Israel) S Perkiss	7	5	3
13	(United States) M Dickson (United States) T Wilkison	3	6	7
(United Kingdom) S Shaw (South Africa) C Steyn	6	4	5
(United States) J Canter (Mexico) L Lavalle	6	7
6	(United States) S Davis (United States) D Pate	3	6

Third round
1	(Sweden) J Nyström (Sweden) M Wilander	6	6
(Australia) B Custer (Australia) D Macpherson	3	2
13	(United States) M Dickson (United States) T Wilkison	4	7	6
(United States) J Canter (Mexico) L Lavalle	6	5	2

Quarterfinals
1	(Sweden) J Nyström (Sweden) M Wilander	6	6	7
(United States) M Dickson (United States) T Wilkison	3	4	6

==== Section 2 ====
First round
(Austria) A Antonitsch (Netherlands) M Schapers	6	6
(Republic of Ireland) M Doyle (West Germany) D Keretić	3	4
(United States) D Cassidy (United States) T Warneke	7	7
(New Zealand) B Derlin (New Zealand) D Mustard	6	6
(Brazil) N Aerts (United States) R Rudeen	4	6
(Australia) A Emerson (Australia) D Tyson	6	7
(Australia) P McNamara (United States) L Shiras	6	6	6
(Australia) M Kratzmann (Australia) S Youl	4	7	3

Second round
4	(Australia) M Edmondson (Australia) K Warwick	4	6	6
(Austria) A Antonitsch (Netherlands) M Schapers	6	3	2
(United States) D Cassidy (United States) T Warneke	6	6	6
15	(United States) M Leach (Nigeria) N Odizor	3	7	3
11	(Australia) B Dyke (Australia) M Fancutt	5	6
(Australia) A Emerson (Australia) D Tyson	7	7
(Australia) P McNamara (United States) L Shiras	3	6	2
7	(United States) S Denton (United States) S Stewart	6	3	6

Third round
4	(Australia) M Edmondson (Australia) K Warwick	6	3	6
(United States) D Cassidy (United States) T Warneke	4	6	4
(Australia) A Emerson (Australia) D Tyson	7	6	6
7	(United States) S Denton (United States) S Stewart	6	7	4

Quarterfinals
4	(Australia) M Edmondson (Australia) K Warwick	3	6	7	6
(Australia) A Emerson (Australia) D Tyson	6	3	5	4

=== Bottom half ===
==== Section 3 ====
First round
(Paraguay) F González (United States) B Teacher	6	6
(United States) B Gilbert (Australia) D Graham	2	4
(Australia) C Miller (Australia) L Warder	6	6	9
(United States) S Giammalva (United States) G Holmes	2	7	7
(United States) Ti Gullikson (United States) S McCain	6	3
(Australia) R Barlow (Australia) C Limberger	7	6
(United States) J Letts (South Africa) M Robertson	6	6
(Netherlands) M Oosting (United States) M Wooldridge	3	4

Second round
8	(United States) M De Palmer (Australia) P Doohan	7	6
(Paraguay) F González (United States) B Teacher	6	3
(Australia) C Miller (Australia) L Warder	6	6
14	(South Africa) E Edwards (South Africa) D Visser	4	2
16	(Australia) B Drewett (United States) M Mitchell	6	6	6
(Australia) R Barlow (Australia) C Limberger	3	7	3
(United States) J Letts (South Africa) M Robertson	2	6	6
3	(Australia) J Fitzgerald (Czechoslovakia) T Šmíd	6	2	1

Third round
8	(United States) M De Palmer (Australia) P Doohan	4	4
(Australia) C Miller (Australia) L Warder	6	6
16	(Australia) B Drewett (United States) M Mitchell	6	4	8
(United States) J Letts (South Africa) M Robertson	3	6	10

Quarterfinals
(Australia) C Miller (Australia) L Warder	7	7	6
(United States) J Letts (South Africa) M Robertson	6	5	2

==== Section 4 ====
First round
(Australia) S Furlong (Australia) M Jeffrey	3	4
(United Kingdom) J Bates (Israel) A Mansdorf	6	6
(New Zealand) K Evernden (United States) B Testerman	7	6
(Australia) J Frawley (New Zealand) C Lewis	6	3
(United States) E Erck (Australia) C Fancutt	6	3	13
(West Germany) W Popp (Netherlands) H van Boeckel	4	6	11
(Australia) D Cahill (Australia) P Carter	7	6
(United States) B Dickinson (United States) E Van't Hof	6	4

Second round
5	(Sweden) S Edberg (France) G Forget	6	6	4
(United Kingdom) J Bates (Israel) A Mansdorf	4	7	6
(New Zealand) K Evernden (United States) B Testerman	6	2^{r}
9	(West Germany) B Becker (Socialist Federal Republic of Yugoslavia) S Živojinović	7	2
12	(United Kingdom) C Dowdeswell (United Kingdom) J Lloyd	6	6	6
(United States) E Erck (Australia) C Fancutt	7	4	4
(Australia) D Cahill (Australia) P Carter	6	3	4
2	(United States) P Annacone (South Africa) C van Rensburg	3	6	6

Third round
(United Kingdom) J Bates (Israel) A Mansdorf	4	4
9	(West Germany) B Becker (Socialist Federal Republic of Yugoslavia) S Živojinović	6	6
12	(United Kingdom) C Dowdeswell (United Kingdom) J Lloyd	5	1
2	(United States) P Annacone (South Africa) C van Rensburg	7	6

Quarterfinals
9	(West Germany) B Becker (Socialist Federal Republic of Yugoslavia) S Živojinović	6	6	7	6	7
2	(United States) P Annacone (South Africa) C van Rensburg	4	7	5	7	9
