= Stuart Bale =

English tennis player

Bale, Stuart
- Country (sports): United Kingdom
- Residence: Islington, England
- Born: 21 January 1964 (age 62) London, England
- Height: 6 ft 1 in (1.85 m)
- Plays: Left-handed
- Prize money: US$48,554

Singles
- Career record: 5–18
- Career titles: 0
- Highest ranking: No. 202 (13 May 1985)

Grand Slam singles results
- Australian Open: 1R (1985)
- Wimbledon: 2R (1983, 1984)

Doubles
- Career record: 4–4
- Career titles: 0
- Highest ranking: No. 256 (19 November 1984)

Stuart Bale (born 21 January 1964) is a male former tennis player from England.

Bale represented his native country in the singles competition at the 1984 Summer Olympics in Los Angeles. He was eliminated in the second round there.

Bale's highest ranking in singles was World No. 202, which he reached in May 1985. His highest doubles ranking was World No. 256, which he reached in November 1984.

Bale made five appearances in the Wimbledon singles draw, making it to the second round in 1983 and 1984, and played in one Australian Open singles draw, losing in the first round in 1985.
