= 1989 Nutri-Metics Open =

- Date: 30 January – 5 February
- Edition: 4th
- Category: Category 1
- Draw: 32S / 16D
- Prize money: $75,000
- Surface: Hard / outdoor
- Location: Auckland, New Zealand
- Venue: ASB Tennis Centre

Champions

Singles
- (United States) Patty Fendick

Doubles
- (United States) Patty Fendick / (Canada) Jill Hetherington
- WTA Auckland Open

The 1989 Nutri-Metics Open was a women's tennis tournament played on outdoor hard courts at the ASB Tennis Centre in Auckland in New Zealand and was part of the Category 1 tier of the 1989 WTA Tour. The tournament ran from 30 January through 5 February 1989. First-seeded Patty Fendick won the singles title.

== Finals ==
=== Singles ===
(United States) Patty Fendick defeated (New Zealand) Belinda Cordwell 6–2, 6–0

- It was Fendick's 1st title of the year and the 9th of her career.

=== Doubles ===
(United States) Patty Fendick / (Canada) Jill Hetherington defeated (Australia) Elizabeth Smylie / (Australia) Janine Thompson 6–4, 6–4

- It was Fendick's 2nd title of the year and the 10th of her career. It was Hetherington's 1st title of the year and the 8th of her career.

== See also ==
- 1989 Benson and Hedges Open – men's tournament
