= 1985 Australian Open – Women's singles =

Women's singles
- 1985 Australian Open

Final
- Champion: (United States) Martina Navratilova
- Runner-up: (United States) Chris Evert
- Score: 6–2, 4–6, 6–2

Details
- Draw: 64
- Seeds: 16

Events
Singles	men	women		boys	girls
Doubles	men	women	mixed	boys	girls
WC Singles	men	women	quad
WC Doubles	men	women	quad
Legends	men	women	mixed
- Australian Open

Martina Navratilova defeated defending champion Chris Evert in the final, 6–2, 4–6, 6–2 to win the women's singles tennis title at the 1985 Australian Open. It was her third Australian Open singles title and 13th major singles title overall.

== Seeds ==
The seeded players are listed below. Martina Navratilova is the champion; others show the round in which they were eliminated.

1. (United States) Chris Evert (finalist)
2. (United States) Martina Navratilova (champion)
3. (Czechoslovakia) Hana Mandlíková (semifinals)
4. (United States) Pam Shriver (third round)
5. (West Germany) Claudia Kohde-Kilsch (semifinals)
6. (United States) Zina Garrison (quarterfinals)
7. (Bulgaria) Manuela Maleeva (quarterfinals)
8. (Czechoslovakia) Helena Suková (quarterfinals)
9. (Australia) Wendy Turnbull (third round)
10. (Sweden) Catarina Lindqvist (quarterfinals)
11. (United States) Barbara Potter (second round)
12. (West Germany) Bettina Bunge (first round)
13. (United Kingdom) Jo Durie (third round)
14. (United States) Lisa Bonder (second round)
15. (France) Pascale Paradis (first round)
16. (Bulgaria) Katerina Maleeva (third round)

== Draw ==
=== Key ===
- Q = Qualifier
- WC = Wild card
- LL = Lucky loser
- r = Retired

=== Finals ===
Quarterfinals
1	(United States) Chris Evert	6	6
7	(Bulgaria) Manuela Maleeva	3	3
10	(Sweden) Catarina Lindqvist	4	0
5	(West Germany) Claudia Kohde-Kilsch	6	6
6	(United States) Zina Garrison	6	3	3
3	(Czechoslovakia) Hana Mandlíková	2	6	6
8	(Czechoslovakia) Helena Suková	2	2
2	(United States) Martina Navratilova	6	6

Semifinals
1	(United States) Chris Evert	6	7^{8}
5	(West Germany) Claudia Kohde-Kilsch	1	6^{6}
3	(Czechoslovakia) Hana Mandlíková	7^{7}	1	4
2	(United States) Martina Navratilova	6^{5}	6	6

Finals
1	(United States) Chris Evert	2	6	2
2	(United States) Martina Navratilova	6	4	6

=== Earlier rounds ===
==== Section 1 ====
First round
1	(United States) C Evert	6	6
(South Africa) R Fairbank	1	2
(United States) B Nagelsen	4	6	8
(United States) C Reynolds	6	3	6
(United Kingdom) A Brown	6	1	6
(United States) B Gerken	2	6	0
(Australia) D Balestrat	6	6
12	(West Germany) B Bunge	4	2
16	(Bulgaria) K Maleeva	7	6
(United States) S Walsh-Pete	5	4
Q	(Japan) M Yanagi	7	6
(United States) A Moulton	5	2
(West Germany) M Schropp	6	6
(Netherlands) M Mesker	3	4
(United States) L Antonoplis	1	1
7	(Bulgaria) M Maleeva	6	6

Second round
1	(United States) C Evert	4	6	6
(United States) B Nagelsen	6	4	0
(United Kingdom) A Brown	0	5
(Australia) D Balestrat	6	7
16	(Bulgaria) K Maleeva	6	7^{7}
Q	(Japan) M Yanagi	3	6^{5}
(West Germany) M Schropp	2	3
7	(Bulgaria) M Maleeva	6	6

Third round
1	(United States) C Evert	6	6
(Australia) D Balestrat	4	1
16	(Bulgaria) K Maleeva	2	1
7	(Bulgaria) M Maleeva	6	6

Quarterfinals
1	(United States) C Evert	6	6
7	(Bulgaria) M Maleeva	3	3

==== Section 2 ====
First round
4	(United States) P Shriver	6	6
(Czechoslovakia) A Holíková	2	3
Q	(Australia) R Bryant	2	6	6
(United States) L Gates	6	4	2
(Japan) E Inoue	6	7^{7}
WC	(Australia) E Minter	4	6^{4}
(Czechoslovakia) R Maršíková	5	2
10	(Sweden) C Lindqvist	7	6
13	(United Kingdom) J Durie	6	6
(Australia) A Minter	4	4
(United Kingdom) S Gomer	6	7^{7}
(United States) L Spain-Short	2	6^{5}
(United States) G Fernández	6	6
(Sweden) C Karlsson	1	4
(United Kingdom) A Croft	5	3
5	(West Germany) C Kohde-Kilsch	7	6

Second round
4	(United States) P Shriver	6	6
Q	(Australia) R Bryant	4	1
(Japan) E Inoue	4	5
10	(Sweden) C Lindqvist	6	7
13	(United Kingdom) J Durie	6	6
(United Kingdom) S Gomer	2	3
(United States) G Fernández	1	2
5	(West Germany) C Kohde-Kilsch	6	6

Third round
4	(United States) P Shriver	6	3	2
10	(Sweden) C Lindqvist	3	6	6
13	(United Kingdom) J Durie	6	1	2
5	(West Germany) C Kohde-Kilsch	3	6	6

Quarterfinals
10	(Sweden) C Lindqvist	4	0
5	(West Germany) C Kohde-Kilsch	6	6

==== Section 3 ====
First round
6	(United States) Z Garrison	6	4	6
(New Zealand) B Cordwell	4	6	4
Q	(Czechoslovakia) K Skronská	6	6
(United States) T Holladay	3	3
(United States) A Henricksson	4	7^{7}	6
WC	(Australia) J Byrne	6	6^{5}	4
WC	(Australia) L Field	6	6
14	(United States) L Bonder	3	3
9	(Australia) W Turnbull	6	6
Q	(Australia) S Leo	0	0
(Australia) E Smylie	6	4	6
Q	(France) C Suire	2	6	3
(United Kingdom) V Wade	6	5	6
(United States) M Van Nostrand	3	7	2
(United States) C Benjamin	2	2
3	(Czechoslovakia) H Mandlíková	6	6

Second round
6	(United States) Z Garrison	6	6
Q	(Czechoslovakia) K Skronská	1	1
(United States) A Henricksson	3	6	9
14	(United States) L Bonder	6	3	7
9	(Australia) W Turnbull	6	6
(Australia) E Smylie	0	0
(United Kingdom) V Wade	2	6^{4}
3	(Czechoslovakia) H Mandlíková	6	7^{7}

Third round
6	(United States) Z Garrison	4	6	6
(United States) A Henricksson	6	1	3
9	(Australia) W Turnbull	3	4
3	(Czechoslovakia) H Mandlíková	6	6

Quarterfinals
6	(United States) Z Garrison	6	3	3
3	(Czechoslovakia) H Mandlíková	2	6	6

==== Section 4 ====
First round
8	(Czechoslovakia) H Suková	6	6
(Australia) J Tremelling	4	4
(United States) R White	6	5	6
(United States) L McNeil	4	7	1
(Switzerland) C Jolissaint	6^{1}	6	6
(United States) E Burgin	7^{7}	4	2
Q	(Australia) A Dingwall	6	5	6
15	(France) P Paradis	2	7	2
11	(United States) B Potter	6	6
Q	(United States) B Norton	3	2
(United Kingdom) A Hobbs	6	6
(United States) N Hu	2	3
WC	(Australia) N Provis	6	6
(France) S Amiach	3	1
Q	(United States) D-A Hansel	2	1
2	(United States) M Navratilova	6	6

Second round
8	(Czechoslovakia) H Suková	6	6
(United States) R White	4	3
(Switzerland) C Jolissaint	2	6^{4}
Q	(Australia) A Dingwall	6	7^{7}
11	(United States) B Potter	4	5
(United Kingdom) A Hobbs	6	7
WC	(Australia) N Provis	2	1
2	(United States) M Navratilova	6	6

Third round
8	(Czechoslovakia) H Suková	6	6
Q	(Australia) A Dingwall	3	1
(United Kingdom) A Hobbs	3	1
2	(United States) M Navratilova	6	6

Quarterfinals
8	(Czechoslovakia) H Suková	2	2
2	(United States) M Navratilova	6	6

== See also ==
- Evert–Navratilova rivalry

Preceded by 1985 US Open – Women's singles	Grand Slam women's singles	Succeeded by 1986 French Open – Women's singles
