= Rebecca Bryant =

Australian tennis player

- Country (sports): Australia
- Born: 20 December 1963 (age 61)
- Prize money: $37,056

Singles
- Highest ranking: No. 149 (22 June 1987)

Grand Slam singles results
- Australian Open: 2R (1985, 1987)
- French Open: Q1 (1985)
- Wimbledon: 1R (1986)
- US Open: Q1 (1986)

Doubles
- Highest ranking: No. 123 (21 December 1986)

Grand Slam doubles results
- Australian Open: 1R (1983, 1984, 1987)
- French Open: 1R (1986)
- Wimbledon: Q1 (1986)
- US Open: 1R (1986)

Rebecca Bryant (born 20 December 1963) is an Australian former professional tennis player.

Bryant was raised in Canberra and competed on the professional tour in the 1980s. She reached a career best singles ranking of 149 in the world and twice made the second round of the Australian Open.

== ITF finals ==
=== Singles (0–2) ===
| Result | No. | Date | Tournament | Surface | Opponent | Score |
|---|---|---|---|---|---|---|
| Loss | 1. | 25 February 1985 | ITF Tasmania, Australia | Hard | (New Zealand) Belinda Cordwell | 6–4, 3–6, 6–7 |
| Loss | 2. | 29 April 1985 | ITF Canberra, Australia | Grass | (New Zealand) Belinda Cordwell | 2–6, 6–4, 4–6 |

=== Doubles (0–3) ===
| Result | No. | Date | Tournament | Surface | Partner | Opponents | Score |
|---|---|---|---|---|---|---|---|
| Loss | 1. | 25 June 1984 | ITF Chatham, United States | Hard | (United States) Aschara Maranon | (New Zealand) Belinda Cordwell (New Zealand) Julie Richardson | 2–6, 0–6 |
| Loss | 2. | 2 July 1984 | ITF Detroit, United States | Hard | (New Zealand) Belinda Cordwell | (United States) Patty Fendick (United States) Linda Howell | 4–6, 6–7 |
| Loss | 3. | 22 July 1984 | ITF Fayetteville, United States | Hard | (Australia) Natalia Leipus | (United States) Linda Gates (United States) Cynthia MacGregor | 1–6, 6–7 |
