= Michelle Turk =

Australian tennis player

- Country (sports): Australia
- Born: 23 September 1967 (age 57)
- Prize money: $19,196

Singles
- Highest ranking: No. 255 (2 March 1987)

Grand Slam singles results
- Australian Open: 1R (1987)

Doubles
- Highest ranking: No. 175 (21 December 1986)

Grand Slam doubles results
- Australian Open: 1R (1985)

Michelle Turk (born 23 September 1967) is an Australian former professional tennis player.

Turk, who comes from the Illawarra region of New South Wales, was one of the country's top junior players, training at the AIS in Canberra.

In 1985 she made the junior singles quarter-finals of the Australian Open and featured in the women's doubles main draw, where she and partner Louise Field were beaten in the first round by number one seeds Martina Navratilova and Pam Shriver. She also teamed up with Field that year to win a $25,000 satellite tournament on the Gold Coast.

While competing on the professional tour she reached a career best singles ranking of 255 in the world and played as a wildcard in the women's singles main draw of the 1987 Australian Open.

== ITF finals ==
Legend
$25,000 tournaments
$10,000 tournaments

=== Doubles: 5 (1–4) ===
Outcome	No.	Date	Tournament	Surface	Partner	Opponents	Score
Runner-up	1.	17 June 1984	Freehold, United States	Hard	(Australia) Louise Field	(United States) Linda Howell (United States) Linda Gates	6–4, 2–6, 1–6
Runner-up	2.	4 March 1985	Tasmania, Australia	Hard	(Australia) Colleen Carney	(Australia) Louise Field (Australia) Janine Thompson	1–6, 6–4, 4–6
Runner-up	3.	22 September 1985	Boston, United States	Hard	(Australia) Colleen Carney	(Australia) Louise Field (Australia) Lisa O'Neill	4–6, 1–6
Winner	1.	8 November 1985	Gold Coast, Australia	Grass	(Australia) Louise Field	(Australia) Chris O'Neil (Australia) Pam Whytcross	6–0, 7–5
Runner-up	4.	29 June 1986	Seabrook, United States	Clay	(Australia) Alison Scott	(Netherlands) Manon Bollegraf (South Africa) Lise Gregory	2–6, 1–6
