= Pamela Jung =

American tennis player

- Country (sports): United States
- Born: 3 July 1963 (age 61)
- Prize money: $27,281

Singles
- Career record: 48–73
- Highest ranking: No. 215 (Feb 1, 1988)

Grand Slam singles results
- Australian Open: 1R (1988)
- Wimbledon: Q1 (1988)

Doubles
- Career record: 28–40
- Career titles: 2 ITF
- Highest ranking: No. 269 (Dec 21, 1986)

Pamela Jung (born July 3, 1963) is an American former professional tennis player.

Jung grew up in California as one of four tennis playing siblings, coached by their father Eugene. The Jungs were the "USTA Tennis Family of the Year" in 1984. One of her brothers, Steven, made the title match at the 1989 NCAA Division I singles championships and competed professionally.

A two-time All-American for Pepperdine University, Jung has the distinction of being the first player from the school to receive this honor (in 1983). Jung, who had a career high ranking of 215 on the professional tour, qualified for the main draw of the 1988 Australian Open. Her best performance on the WTA Tour came at the 1988 Auckland Open, where she beat sixth seed Elizabeth Minter en route to the third round.

== ITF finals ==
$25,000 tournaments
$10,000 tournaments

=== Singles: 2 (0–2) ===
Result	No.	Date	Tournament	Surface	Opponent	Score
Loss	1.	July 31, 1988	Evansville, United States	Clay	(Poland) Renata Baranski	3–6, 2–6
Loss	2.	January 28, 1990	New Braunfels, United States	Hard	(France) Mary Pierce	5–7, 6-7^{(6)}

=== Doubles: 2 (2–0) ===
Result	No.	Date	Tournament	Surface	Partner	Opponents	Score
Win	1.	July 27, 1986	Mexico City, Mexico	Clay	(United States) Judy Newman	(Argentina) Gabriela Mosca (Argentina) Andrea Tiezzi	3–6, 7–5, 7–6
Win	2.	January 14, 1990	Midland, United States	Hard	(United States) Linley Tanner	(United States) Allison Cooper (United States) Eleni Rossides	6–3, 6–0
