= 1985 Australian Open =

- Date: 25 November – 8 December 1985
- Edition: 74th
- Category: Grand Slam (ITF)
- Surface: Grass
- Location: Melbourne, Australia
- Venue: Kooyong Lawn Tennis Club

Champions

Men's singles
- (Sweden) Stefan Edberg

Women's singles
- (United States) Martina Navratilova

Men's doubles
- (United States) Paul Annacone / (South Africa) Christo van Rensburg

Women's doubles
- (United States) Martina Navratilova / (United States) Pam Shriver

Boys' singles
- (Australia) Shane Barr

Girls' singles
- (Australia) Jenny Byrne

Boys' doubles
- (Australia) Brett Custer / (Australia) David Macpherson

Girls' doubles
- (Australia) Jenny Byrne / (United States) Janine Thompson
← 1984 ·	Australian Open	· 1987 →

The 1985 Australian Open was a tennis tournament played on grass courts at the Kooyong Lawn Tennis Club in Melbourne in Victoria in Australia. It was the 74th edition of the Australian Open and was held from 25 November through 8 December 1985; the last to be held at this time of year.

With the decision to hold the tournament in January in future, the next Australian Open would be the 1987 Open, held just over a year later.

== Seniors ==
=== Men's singles ===
(Sweden) Stefan Edberg defeated (Sweden) Mats Wilander, 6–4, 6–3, 6–3

• It was Edberg's 1st career Grand Slam singles title.

=== Women's singles ===
(United States) Martina Navratilova defeated (United States) Chris Evert, 6–2, 4–6, 6–2

• It was Navratilova's 13th career Grand Slam singles title and her 3rd and last title at the Australian Open.

=== Men's doubles ===
(United States) Paul Annacone / (South Africa) Christo van Rensburg defeated (Australia) Mark Edmondson / (Australia) Kim Warwick, 3–6, 7–6, 6–4, 6–4

• It was Annacone's 1st and only career Grand Slam doubles title.
• It was van Rensburg's 1st and only career Grand Slam doubles title.

=== Women's doubles ===
(United States) Martina Navratilova / (United States) Pam Shriver defeated (West Germany) Claudia Kohde-Kilsch / (Czechoslovakia) Helena Suková 6–3, 6–4

- It was Navratilova's 37th career Grand Slam title and her 8th Australian Open title. It was Shriver's 12th career Grand Slam title and her 4th Australian Open title.

=== Mixed doubles ===
The competition was not held between 1970 and 1985.

== Juniors ==
=== Boys' singles ===
(Australia) Shane Barr defeated (Australia) Steve Furlong 7–6, 6–7, 6–3

=== Girls' singles ===
(Australia) Jenny Byrne defeated (Australia) Louise Field 6–1, 6–3

=== Boys' doubles ===
(Australia) Brett Custer / (Australia) David Macpherson defeated (Czechoslovakia) Petr Korda / (Czechoslovakia) Cyril Suk 7–5, 6–2

=== Girls' doubles ===
(Australia) Jenny Byrne / (Australia) Janine Thompson defeated (Australia) Sally McCann / (Australia) Alison Scott 6–0, 6–3

Preceded by 1985 US Open	Grand Slams	Succeeded by 1986 French Open
