= Linda Howell =

American tennis player

- Full name: Linda S. Howell
- Country (sports): United States
- Born: November 6, 1963 (age 61)
- Prize money: $23,459

Singles

Grand Slam singles results
- US Open: 1R (1984)

Doubles

Grand Slam doubles results
- Wimbledon: 1R (1985)
- US Open: 1R (1985)

Linda Howell (born November 6, 1963) is a former professional tennis player from the United States.

== Biography ==
Howell played collegiate tennis at San Diego State University in the 1980s, during which time she also competed briefly on the professional tour. She joined San Diego State in 1982 and in 1984 was an NCAA doubles semi-finalist with Cynthia MacGregor.

At the 1984 US Open she featured in the main draw of a grand slam tournament for the first time and was beaten in the opening round by Helena Suková. A month later she was a quarter-finalist at a Virginia Slims event back in San Diego, then at the end of the year she went overseas to compete in Australia. She was unable to qualify for the Australian Open but played at the 1984 NSW Open, where she lost a three-set match to Steffi Graf. The following year at the 1985 Wimbledon Championships she played in both the women's doubles and mixed doubles main draws.

She had a small role in the 1990 film Total Recall, starring Arnold Schwarzenegger, as the tennis instructor hologram being used by the character played by Sharon Stone.

Now living in New Mexico, she has a career in a different sport, golf, working as the head PGA professional at Rockwind Community Links in Hobbs, New Mexico.
