= Colleen Carney =

Australian tennis player

- Country (sports): Australia
- Born: 23 January 1967 (age 58)
- Plays: Right-handed
- Prize money: $21,779

Singles

Grand Slam singles results
- Australian Open: 1R (1984)
- French Open: Q1 (1985)
- Wimbledon: Q2 (1986)
- US Open: Q1 (1985)

Doubles

Grand Slam doubles results
- Wimbledon: Q1 (1986)

Colleen Carney (born 23 January 1967) is an Australian former professional tennis player.

Carney, who grew up in Sydney, received a scholarship to the Australian Institute of Sport in 1983.

Active on tour in the 1980s, Carney was ranked amongst the world's top 200 players and featured in the qualifying draws of all four grand slam tournaments, reaching the main draw only at the 1984 Australian Open.
