= Louise Field =

Australian tennis player

- Country (sports): Australia
- Born: 25 February 1967 (age 59)
- Prize money: US$393,224

Singles
- Career record: 183–210
- Career titles: 0
- Highest ranking: 96th (28 August 1989)

Grand Slam singles results
- Australian Open: 2R (1984 1985, 1987, 1988. 1989, 1992)
- French Open: 2R (1986, 1988)
- Wimbledon: 3R (1989)
- US Open: 1R (1987, 1989)

Doubles
- Career record: 168–171
- Career titles: 2
- Highest ranking: 48th (22 October 1990)

Grand Slam doubles results
- Australian Open: 3R (1987)
- French Open: 2R (1988, 1992)
- Wimbledon: 3R (1987, 1990)
- US Open: 3R (1988, 1989, 1993)

Louise Field (born 25 February 1967) is a retired professional tennis player from Australia. She competed in the Australian Open from 1984 to 1994.

== WTA Tour finals ==
=== Singles (0–1) ===
Result	W/L	Date	Tournament	Surface	Opponent	Score
Loss	1–0	Dec 1985	Auckland, New Zealand	Grass	(United Kingdom) Anne Hobbs	3–6, 1–6

=== Doubles (2–1) ===
Result	W/L	Date	Tournament	Surface	Partner	Opponents	Score
Loss	0–1	Sep 1988	Paris, France	Clay	(France) Nathalie Herreman	(France) Alexia Dechaume (France) Emmanuelle Derly	0–6, 2–6
Win	1–1	May 1990	Geneva, Switzerland	Clay	(South Africa) Dianne Van Rensburg	(United States) Elise Burgin (United States) Betsy Nagelsen	5–7, 7–6^{(7–2)}, 7–5
Win	2–1	Sep 1990	Bayonne, France	Hard (i)	(France) Catherine Tanvier	(Australia) Jo-Anne Faull (Australia) Rachel McQuillan	7–6, 6–7, 7–6

== Career finals ==
=== Singles (4–3) ===
$25,000 tournaments
$10,000 tournaments

Result	No.	Date	Tournament	Surface	Opponent	Score
Loss	1.	13 November 1982	Bulleen, Australia	Clay	(Australia) Elizabeth Minter	2–6, 6–4, 5–7
Win	1.	11 March 1985	Adelaide, Australia	Hard	(New Zealand) Belinda Cordwell	6–3, 6–1
Loss	2.	22 September 1985	Boston, United States	Hard	(United States) Beth Norton	0–6, 4–6
Win	2.	23 March 1987	Melbourne, Australia	Hard	(Sweden) Helena Dahlström	6–3, 6–3
Loss	3.	30 March 1987	Adelaide, Australia	Hard	(New Zealand) Belinda Cordwell	0–6, 6–4, 4–6
Win	3.	4 December 1988	Melbourne, Australia	Hard	(Australia) Louise Stacey	4–6, 6–2, 6–1
Win	4.	10 November 1991	Port Pirie, Australia	Hard	(Australia) Jenny Byrne	6–4, 6–4

=== Doubles (6–7) ===
Result	No.	Date	Tournament	Surface	Partner	Opponents	Score
Loss	1.	17 June 1984	Freehold, United States	Hard	(Australia) Michelle Turk	(United States) Linda Gates (United States) Linda Howell	6–4, 2–6, 1–6
Win	1.	25 February 1985	Tasmania, Australia	Hard	(Australia) Janine Thompson	(Australia) Colleen Carney (Australia) Michelle Turk	6–1, 4–6, 6–4
Win	2.	10 March 1985	Melbourne, Australia	Hard	(Australia) Janine Thompson	(Australia) Karen Deed (Australia) Wendy Frazer	6–7, 6–0, 6–1
Loss	2.	11 March 1985	Adelaide, Australia	Hard	(Australia) Janine Thompson	(Australia) Belinda Cordwell (New Zealand) Julie Richardson	2–6, 6–2, 2–6
Loss	3.	15 July 1985	Landskrona, Sweden	Clay	(Australia) Janine Thompson	(Canada) Jill Hetherington (United States) Jaime Kaplan	5–7, 2–6
Loss	4.	15 September 1985	Hopewell, United States	Clay	(Japan) Akemi Nishiya	(United States) Diane Farrell (United States) Jenni Goodling	6–2, 5–7, 4–6
Win	3.	22 September 1985	Boston, United States	Hard	(Australia) Lisa O'Neill	(Australia) Colleen Carney (Australia) Michelle Turk	6–4, 6–1
Win	4.	8 November 1985	Gold Coast, Australia	Grass	(Australia) Michelle Turk	(Australia) Chris O'Neil (Australia) Pam Whytcross	6–0, 7–5
Loss	5.	14 April 1986	Canberra, Australia	Gras	(Australia) Elizabeth Minter	(United States) Anna-Maria Fernandez (New Zealand) Julie Richardson	7–5, 3–6, 3–6
Loss	6.	31 October 1986	Sydney, Australia	Hard	(Australia) Nicole Bradtke	(Australia) Michelle Jaggard-Lai (Australia) Lisa O'Neill	w/o
Win	5.	23 March 1987	Melbourne, Australia	Hard	(New Zealand) Belinda Cordwell	(Australia) Colleen Carney (Sweden) Anna-Karin Olsson	6–2, 3–6, 6–3
Win	6.	30 March 1987	Adelaide, Australia	Hard	(New Zealand) Belinda Cordwell	(Australia) Colleen Carney (Australia) Alison Scott	6–1, 1–6, 6–4
Loss	7.	21 November 1988	Adelaide, Australia	Hard	(Australia) Alison Scott	(Australia) Jo-Anne Faull (Australia) Rachel McQuillan	5–7, 4–6
