= 1984 Australian Open – Men's singles qualifying =

Men's singles qualifying
- 1984 Australian Open

Events
Singles	men	women		boys	girls
Doubles	men	women	mixed	boys	girls
WC Singles	men	women	quad
WC Doubles	men	women	quad
Legends	men	women	mixed

Qualification
Singles	men	women
- Australian Open

This article displays the qualifying draw for men's singles at the 1984 Australian Open.

== Seeds ==
1. (United States) Brian Levine (qualified)
2. (United Kingdom) Jonathan Smith (second round)
3. (Austria) Peter Feigl (qualified)
4. (United Kingdom) Jeremy Bates (first round)
5. (Spain) Jorge Bardou (first round)
6. (United States) Richard Meyer (qualifying competition, Lucky loser)
7. (Australia) Broderick Dyke (qualified)
8. (United States) Kelvin Belcher (second round)
9. (United States) Matt Anger (qualified)
10. (United States) Randy Nixon (qualified)
11. (Finland) Leo Palin (first round)
12. (United States) Tom Cain (qualifying competition, Lucky loser)
13. (West Germany) Christoph Zipf (qualifying competition)
14. (Netherlands) Huub van Boeckel (second round)
15. (United States) Roger Knapp (qualifying competition)
16. (Australia) Chris Johnstone (second round)
17. (Netherlands) Tom Nijssen (qualifying competition)
18. (United States) Charles Cox (first round)
19. (United Kingdom) Stuart Bale (qualifying competition)
20. (New Zealand) Steve Guy (second round)
21. (United States) Craig Wittus (qualifying competition)
22. (Australia) Greg Whitecross (qualified)
23. (Australia) Peter Johnston (qualifying competition)
24. (Australia) Rod Frawley (second round)

== Qualifiers ==
1. (United States) Brian Levine
2. (Australia) Darren Cahill
3. (Austria) Peter Feigl
4. (Australia) Paul Kronk
5. (United States) Corey Wittenberg
6. (Sweden) Ronnie Båthman
7. (Australia) Broderick Dyke
8. (Australia) Dale Houston
9. (United States) Matt Anger
10. (United States) Randy Nixon
11. (Australia) Michael Fancutt
12. (Australia) Greg Whitecross

== Lucky losers ==
1. (United States) Richard Meyer
2. (United States) Tom Cain

== Qualifying draw ==
Key

- Q = Qualifier
- WC = Wild card
- LL = Lucky loser
- Alt = Alternate
- ITF = ITF entry
- PR = Protected ranking
- SR = Special ranking
- SE = Special exempt
- JE = Junior exempt
- JR = Junior Accelerator Programme entrant
- CO = College Accelerator Programme entrant
- NG = Next Gen Accelerator Program entrant
- w/o = Walkover
- r = Retired
- d = Defaulted

=== First qualifier ===
First round
(Australia) Brenden Sharp	6	6
(Australia) Russell Barlow	3	4
(Australia) Mark Hartnett	5	4
20	(New Zealand) Steve Guy	7	6

Second round
1	(United States) Brian Levine	6	6
(Australia) Brenden Sharp	3	3
(France) Thierry Champion	2	6	6
20	(New Zealand) Steve Guy	6	4	2

Qualifying competition
1	(United States) Brian Levine	6	4	6
(France) Thierry Champion	2	6	3

=== Second qualifier ===
First round
(Australia) Darren Cahill	6	6	13
(Australia) John McCurdy	7	3	11
(United States) Cary Stansbury	6	6
(Australia) Jamie Harty	4	4

Second round
2	(United Kingdom) Jonathan Smith	2	4
(Australia) Darren Cahill	6	6
(United States) Cary Stansbury	6	6
19	(United Kingdom) Stuart Bale	7	7

Qualifying competition
(Australia) Darren Cahill	6	3	6
19	(United Kingdom) Stuart Bale	4	6	3

=== Third qualifier ===
First round
(Australia) Patrick Flynn	7	2
(Australia) Mike Baroch	6	1^{r}
(Australia) Paul Mick	6	6	6
(Australia) Brett Custer	0	7	4

Second round
3	(Austria) Peter Feigl	6	6
(Australia) Patrick Flynn	1	2
(Australia) Paul Mick	1	3
15	(United States) Roger Knapp	6	6

Qualifying competition
3	(Austria) Peter Feigl	6	3	6
15	(United States) Roger Knapp	4	6	3

=== Fourth qualifier ===
First round
4	(United Kingdom) Jeremy Bates	3	6
(United States) Peter Rennert	6	7
(Australia) Paul Kronk	6	6
(Australia) John Tregonning	3	1
(Australia) Craig Tregonning	6	7
18	(United States) Charles Cox	3	6

Second round
(United States) Peter Rennert	3	4
(Australia) Paul Kronk	6	6
(Finland) Mika Hedman	6	6
(Australia) Craig Tregonning	3	4

Qualifying competition
(Australia) Paul Kronk	7	2	6
(Finland) Mika Hedman	6	6	1

=== Fifth qualifier ===
First round
5	(Spain) Jorge Bardou	4	4
(United States) Erik Van't Hof	6	6
(Australia) Chris Tregonning	6	7
(Australia) Rod McLoughlin	3	6

Second round
(United States) Erik Van't Hof	4	6
(United States) Corey Wittenberg	6	7
(Australia) Chris Tregonning	4	4
13	(West Germany) Christoph Zipf	6	6

Qualifying competition
(United States) Corey Wittenberg	7	6
13	(West Germany) Christoph Zipf	6	2

=== Sixth qualifier ===
First round
(Sweden) Ronnie Båthman	7	6
(Australia) Steve Furlong	6	2
(Australia) P. Wright	2	2
16	(Australia) Chris Johnstone	6	6

Second round
6	(United States) Richard Meyer	6	6
(France) François Errard	1	3
(Sweden) Ronnie Båthman	6	6
16	(Australia) Chris Johnstone	4	2

Qualifying competition
6	(United States) Richard Meyer	4	2
(Sweden) Ronnie Båthman	6	6

=== Seventh qualifier ===
First round
7	(Australia) Broderick Dyke	6	6
(Australia) Chris Ellis	2	4
(Australia) Gavin Pfitzner	3	3
17	(Netherlands) Tom Nijssen	6	6

Second round
7	(Australia) Broderick Dyke	6	6
(Australia) T. Mandoukos	1	1
(Brazil) Eduardo Oncins	3	6	4
17	(Netherlands) Tom Nijssen	6	4	6

Qualifying competition
7	(Australia) Broderick Dyke	6	6
17	(Netherlands) Tom Nijssen	4	3

=== Eighth qualifier ===
First round
(Australia) Archie Adamopoulos	3	3
(Australia) Des Tyson	6	6
(Australia) Peter Carter	4	4
(Australia) Dale Houston	6	6
(Australia) S. Salthouse	3	6
14	(Netherlands) Huub van Boeckel	6	7

Second round
8	(United States) Kelvin Belcher	6	3	2
(Australia) Des Tyson	3	6	6
(Australia) Dale Houston	6	6	6
14	(Netherlands) Huub van Boeckel	3	7	3

Qualifying competition
(Australia) Des Tyson	6	4
(Australia) Dale Houston	7	6

=== Ninth qualifier ===
First round
(Australia) Daryl Greeves	2	2
(United States) Richard Akel	6	6
(Australia) Craig McInnes	5	0
21	(United States) Craig Wittus	7	6

Second round
9	(United States) Matt Anger	6	6
(United States) Richard Akel	4	3
(West Germany) Harald Theissen	w/o
21	(United States) Craig Wittus

Qualifying competition
9	(United States) Matt Anger	6	6
21	(United States) Craig Wittus	1	3

=== Tenth qualifier ===
First round
(Australia) David Macpherson	2	2
(New Zealand) William Laban	6	6
(Australia) John Stoddart	2	6
23	(Australia) Peter Johnston	6	7

Second round
10	(United States) Randy Nixon	7	4	6
(New Zealand) William Laban	6	6	3
(Australia) Anthony Lane	6	6
23	(Australia) Peter Johnston	7	7

Qualifying competition
10	(United States) Randy Nixon	7	7
23	(Australia) Peter Johnston	6	6

=== Eleventh qualifier ===
First round
11	(Finland) Leo Palin	6	3	4
(United States) Eric Sherbeck	2	6	6
(Australia) Richard Cahill	4	1
(Australia) Michael Fancutt	6	6

Second round
(United States) Eric Sherbeck	7	6
(Australia) Anthony Burke	5	3
(Australia) Michael Fancutt	3	7	13
24	(Australia) Rod Frawley	6	6	11

Qualifying competition
(United States) Eric Sherbeck	4	7	4
(Australia) Michael Fancutt	6	5	6

=== Twelfth qualifier ===
First round
12	(United States) Tom Cain	6	6
(Australia) Richard Fricker	3	2
(United States) Rick Meyers	0	1
(Australia) Mark Woodforde	6	6
(Australia) Peter Thrupp	6	2	1
22	(Australia) Greg Whitecross	3	6	6

Second round
12	(United States) Tom Cain	7	6
(Australia) Mark Woodforde	5	3
(Australia) Craig Uren	2	0
22	(Australia) Greg Whitecross	6	6

Qualifying competition
12	(United States) Tom Cain	4	5
22	(Australia) Greg Whitecross	6	7
