= 1985 ATP Challenger Series =

Details
- Duration: 14 January 1985 – 8 December 1985
- Edition: 8th
- Tournaments: 39

Achievements (singles)

The ATP Challenger Series is the second-tier tour for professional tennis organised by the Association of Tennis Professionals (ATP). The 1985 ATP Challenger Series calendar comprises 39 tournaments, with prize money ranging from $25,000 up to $75,000.

== Schedule ==
=== January ===
Week of	Tournament	Champions	Runners-up	Semifinalists	Quarterfinalists
January 7	No tournaments scheduled.				
January 14	Guarujá Challenger; Guarujá, Brazil $50,000 – clay – 48S/24D; Singles draw – Doubles draw	(Spain) Juan Avendaño; 6–3, 6–3	(Argentina) Roberto Saad	(Brazil) Júlio Góes (Mexico) Francisco Maciel	(Brazil) Fernando Roese (Argentina) Carlos Gattiker (United States) Bud Schultz (Brazil) Eleutério Martins
January 14	Guarujá Challenger; Guarujá, Brazil $50,000 – clay – 48S/24D; Singles draw – Doubles draw	(Sweden) Ronnie Båthman (Sweden) Magnus Tideman; 7–6, 4–6, 6–3	(Argentina) Carlos Gattiker (Argentina) Gustavo Tiberti	(Brazil) Júlio Góes (Mexico) Francisco Maciel	(Brazil) Fernando Roese (Argentina) Carlos Gattiker (United States) Bud Schultz (Brazil) Eleutério Martins
January 21	Agadir Challenger; Agadir, Morocco $25,000 – clay – 32S/16D; Singles draw – Doubles draw	(Spain) Gabriel Urpí; 2–6, 6–4, 6–0	(Spain) David de Miguel	(Finland) Pasi Virtanen (Canada) Martin Wostenholme	(Spain) Eduardo Osta (Netherlands) Tom Nijssen (Belgium) Jan Vanlangendonck (Denmark) Peter Bastiansen
January 21	Agadir Challenger; Agadir, Morocco $25,000 – clay – 32S/16D; Singles draw – Doubles draw	(Italy) Paolo Canè (Switzerland) Claudio Mezzadri; 6–4, 6–4	(Italy) Alessandro de Minicis (Finland) Olli Rahnasto	(Finland) Pasi Virtanen (Canada) Martin Wostenholme	(Spain) Eduardo Osta (Netherlands) Tom Nijssen (Belgium) Jan Vanlangendonck (Denmark) Peter Bastiansen
January 28	No tournaments scheduled.				

=== February ===
Week of	Tournament	Champions	Runners-up	Semifinalists	Quarterfinalists
February 4	No tournaments scheduled.				
February 11	Ogun Challenger; Ogun, Nigeria $25,000 – hard – 32S/16D; Singles draw – Doubles draw	(Italy) Gianni Ocleppo; 6–4, 6–1	(United States) Mark Wooldridge	(United States) Jacques Manset (Austria) Robert Reininger	(United States) Charles Strode (Australia) Charlie Fancutt (United States) Egan Adams (United States) Chris Dunk
February 11	Ogun Challenger; Ogun, Nigeria $25,000 – hard – 32S/16D; Singles draw – Doubles draw	(United States) Chris Dunk (United States) Charles Strode; 7–5, 2–6, 6–3	(United States) Egan Adams (United States) Mark Wooldridge	(United States) Jacques Manset (Austria) Robert Reininger	(United States) Charles Strode (Australia) Charlie Fancutt (United States) Egan Adams (United States) Chris Dunk
February 18	Lagos Open; Lagos, Nigeria $75,000 – clay – 32S/16D; Singles draw – Doubles draw	(Nigeria) Nduka Odizor; 6–3, 6–3	(Austria) Thomas Muster	(Austria) Bernhard Pils (West Germany) Peter Elter	(Italy) Gianni Ocleppo (Nigeria) Tony Mmoh (Austria) Peter Feigl (United States) Egan Adams
February 18	Lagos Open; Lagos, Nigeria $75,000 – clay – 32S/16D; Singles draw – Doubles draw	(United States) Egan Adams (United States) Mark Wooldridge; 6–4, 6–4	(West Germany) Peter Elter (Austria) Peter Feigl	(Austria) Bernhard Pils (West Germany) Peter Elter	(Italy) Gianni Ocleppo (Nigeria) Tony Mmoh (Austria) Peter Feigl (United States) Egan Adams
February 18	Viña del Mar Challenger; Viña del Mar, Chile $25,000 – clay – 32S/16D; Singles draw – Doubles draw	(Chile) Hans Gildemeister; 6–3, 6–4	(Chile) Pedro Rebolledo	(United States) Mark Buckley (United States) Billy Nealon	(Argentina) Gustavo Garetto (United States) Lawson Duncan (Chile) José Antonio Fernández (Chile) Álvaro Fillol
February 18	Viña del Mar Challenger; Viña del Mar, Chile $25,000 – clay – 32S/16D; Singles draw – Doubles draw	(Chile) Hans Gildemeister (Chile) Belus Prajoux; 7–6, 6–3	(Chile) Ricardo Acuña (Puerto Rico) Ernie Fernández	(United States) Mark Buckley (United States) Billy Nealon	(Argentina) Gustavo Garetto (United States) Lawson Duncan (Chile) José Antonio Fernández (Chile) Álvaro Fillol
February 25	Palm Hills International Tennis Challenger; Cairo, Egypt $75,000 – clay – 32S/16D; Singles draw – Doubles draw	(Spain) Fernando Luna; 6–3, 6–4	(Australia) Trevor Allan	(Spain) Jordi Arrese (France) Thierry Tulasne	(West Germany) Peter Elter (Spain) Jesus Colas (Spain) José López-Maeso (Egypt) Tarek El Sakka
February 25	Palm Hills International Tennis Challenger; Cairo, Egypt $75,000 – clay – 32S/16D; Singles draw – Doubles draw	(India) Anand Amritraj (United States) Lloyd Bourne; 6–4, 2–6, 7–5	(Australia) Trevor Allan (Spain) Alberto Tous	(Spain) Jordi Arrese (France) Thierry Tulasne	(West Germany) Peter Elter (Spain) Jesus Colas (Spain) José López-Maeso (Egypt) Tarek El Sakka
February 25	Kaduna Challenger; Kaduna, Nigeria $25,000 – clay – 32S/16D; Singles draw – Doubles draw	(Austria) Hans-Peter Kandler; 2–6, 6–4, 6–0	(Mexico) Alfonso González	(United States) Charles Strode (United States) Jacques Manset	(Nigeria) Nduka Odizor (West Germany) Oliver Freund (Austria) Bernhard Pils (Nigeria) Sadiq Abdullahi
February 25	Kaduna Challenger; Kaduna, Nigeria $25,000 – clay – 32S/16D; Singles draw – Doubles draw	(United States) Richard Akel (United States) Jeff Arons; 6–3, 6–3	(Zimbabwe) Haroon Ismail (Greece) Fotis Vazeos	(United States) Charles Strode (United States) Jacques Manset	(Nigeria) Nduka Odizor (West Germany) Oliver Freund (Austria) Bernhard Pils (Nigeria) Sadiq Abdullahi

=== March ===
Week of	Tournament	Champions	Runners-up	Semifinalists	Quarterfinalists
March 4	Vienna Challenger; Vienna, Austria $25,000 – carpet (I) – 32S/16D; Singles draw – Doubles draw	(Sweden) Jonas Svensson; 6–0, 6–1	(Italy) Alessandro de Minicis	(West Germany) Hans-Dieter Beutel (Austria) Horst Skoff	(Denmark) Peter Bastiansen (South Africa) Kevin Moir (Netherlands) Menno Oosting (Australia) Carl Limberger
March 4	Vienna Challenger; Vienna, Austria $25,000 – carpet (I) – 32S/16D; Singles draw – Doubles draw	(Sweden) Peter Carlsson (Sweden) Jonas Svensson; 6–3, 6–2	(Czechoslovakia) Josef Čihák (Italy) Alessandro de Minicis	(West Germany) Hans-Dieter Beutel (Austria) Horst Skoff	(Denmark) Peter Bastiansen (South Africa) Kevin Moir (Netherlands) Menno Oosting (Australia) Carl Limberger
March 11	No tournaments scheduled.				
March 18	Montreal Challenger; Montreal, Canada $25,000 – hard (I) – 32S/16D; Singles draw – Doubles draw	(United States) Andy Kohlberg; 6–2, 2–6, 7–6	(United States) Randy Nixon	(Australia) John Alexander (United States) Scott McCain	(Canada) Stéphane Bonneau (United States) John Mattke (New Zealand) Kelly Evernden (United States) Leif Shiras
March 18	Montreal Challenger; Montreal, Canada $25,000 – hard (I) – 32S/16D; Singles draw – Doubles draw	(United States) Andy Andrews (United States) Tomm Warneke; 6–3, 7–6	(New Zealand) Kelly Evernden (United States) Michael Robertson	(Australia) John Alexander (United States) Scott McCain	(Canada) Stéphane Bonneau (United States) John Mattke (New Zealand) Kelly Evernden (United States) Leif Shiras
March 25	Tunis Challenger; Tunis, Tunisia $75,000 – clay – 32S/16D; Singles draw – Doubles draw	(West Germany) Hans Schwaier; 6–4, 6–2	(West Germany) Wolfgang Popp	(West Germany) Damir Keretić (Czechoslovakia) Marián Vajda	(Sweden) Henrik Sundström (Egypt) Ahmed El-Mehelmy (West Germany) Oliver Freund (Czechoslovakia) Libor Pimek
March 25	Tunis Challenger; Tunis, Tunisia $75,000 – clay – 32S/16D; Singles draw – Doubles draw	(Chile) Hans Gildemeister (Paraguay) Víctor Pecci; 2–6, 6–4, 6–3	(New Zealand) David Mustard (United Kingdom) Jonathan Smith	(West Germany) Damir Keretić (Czechoslovakia) Marián Vajda	(Sweden) Henrik Sundström (Egypt) Ahmed El-Mehelmy (West Germany) Oliver Freund (Czechoslovakia) Libor Pimek

=== April ===
Week of	Tournament	Champions	Runners-up	Semifinalists	Quarterfinalists
April 1	Marrakech Challenger; Marrakesh, Morocco $50,000 – clay – 32S/16D; Singles draw – Doubles draw	(Haiti) Ronald Agénor; 2–6, 6–3, 6–4	(West Germany) Ricki Osterthun	(Spain) José López-Maeso (Socialist Federal Republic of Yugoslavia) Goran Prpić	(Czechoslovakia) Marián Vajda (Italy) Simone Colombo (Spain) Jordi Arrese (Argentina) Carlos Castellan
April 1	Marrakech Challenger; Marrakesh, Morocco $50,000 – clay – 32S/16D; Singles draw – Doubles draw	(Spain) Sergio Casal (Spain) Emilio Sánchez; 4–6, 6–3, 6–1	(West Germany) Ulf Fischer (Socialist Federal Republic of Yugoslavia) Goran Prpić	(Spain) José López-Maeso (Socialist Federal Republic of Yugoslavia) Goran Prpić	(Czechoslovakia) Marián Vajda (Italy) Simone Colombo (Spain) Jordi Arrese (Argentina) Carlos Castellan
April 1	San Luis Potosí Challenger; San Luis Potosí, Mexico $25,000 – clay – 48S/24D; Singles draw – Doubles draw	(Mexico) Leonardo Lavalle; 4–6, 6–3, 6–4	(United States) Andy Andrews	(Brazil) Dácio Campos (Austria) Robert Reininger	(Austria) Alex Antonitsch (United States) Tomm Warneke (United States) Mark Wooldridge (United States) John Mattke
April 1	San Luis Potosí Challenger; San Luis Potosí, Mexico $25,000 – clay – 48S/24D; Singles draw – Doubles draw	(United States) John Mattke (India) Sashi Menon; 7–6, 6–3	(United States) Richard Akel (United States) Jeff Arons	(Brazil) Dácio Campos (Austria) Robert Reininger	(Austria) Alex Antonitsch (United States) Tomm Warneke (United States) Mark Wooldridge (United States) John Mattke
April 8	Curitiba-1 Challenger; Curitiba, Brazil $25,000 – clay – 32S/16D; Singles draw – Doubles draw	(Brazil) Júlio Góes; 6–4, 6–0	(Argentina) Gustavo Guerrero	(Brazil) César Kist (Italy) Alessandro de Minicis	(Brazil) Luiz Mattar (Argentina) Christian Miniussi (Sweden) Ronnie Båthman (United States) Jon Levine
April 8	Curitiba-1 Challenger; Curitiba, Brazil $25,000 – clay – 32S/16D; Singles draw – Doubles draw	(Brazil) Dácio Campos (Brazil) Luiz Mattar; 7–6, 6–3	(Chile) Álvaro Fillol (Switzerland) Dominik Utzinger	(Brazil) César Kist (Italy) Alessandro de Minicis	(Brazil) Luiz Mattar (Argentina) Christian Miniussi (Sweden) Ronnie Båthman (United States) Jon Levine
April 15	Jerusalem Challenger; Jerusalem, Israel $25,000 – hard – 32S/16D; Singles draw – Doubles draw	(Israel) Shlomo Glickstein; 6–4, 6–3	(Australia) Brad Drewett	(Israel) Shahar Perkiss (United Kingdom) Steve Shaw	(West Germany) Oliver Freund (Israel) Amos Mansdorf (South Africa) Henri de Wet (West Germany) Jaromir Becka
April 15	Jerusalem Challenger; Jerusalem, Israel $25,000 – hard – 32S/16D; Singles draw – Doubles draw	(Israel) Amos Mansdorf (United States) Bruce Manson; 6–7, 6–4, 7–6	(West Germany) Tore Meinecke (West Germany) Ricki Osterthun	(Israel) Shahar Perkiss (United Kingdom) Steve Shaw	(West Germany) Oliver Freund (Israel) Amos Mansdorf (South Africa) Henri de Wet (West Germany) Jaromir Becka
April 15	Rio de Janeiro Open; Rio de Janeiro, Brazil $50,000 – clay – 32S/16D; Singles draw – Doubles draw	(Brazil) Givaldo Barbosa; 7–5, 6–3	(Brazil) Marcelo Hennemann	(Brazil) Ivan Kley (Argentina) Marcelo Ingaramo	(Brazil) Carlos Kirmayr (Austria) Hans-Peter Kandler (Brazil) Dácio Campos (Argentina) Christian Miniussi
April 15	Rio de Janeiro Open; Rio de Janeiro, Brazil $50,000 – clay – 32S/16D; Singles draw – Doubles draw	(Brazil) Givaldo Barbosa (Brazil) Ivan Kley; 6–1, 6–3	(Brazil) Marcos Hocevar (Brazil) Alexandre Hocevar	(Brazil) Ivan Kley (Argentina) Marcelo Ingaramo	(Brazil) Carlos Kirmayr (Austria) Hans-Peter Kandler (Brazil) Dácio Campos (Argentina) Christian Miniussi
April 22	No tournaments scheduled.				
April 29	Berkeley Challenger (United States) Berkeley, USA $25,000 – hard – 64S/32D; Singles draw – Doubles draw	(South Africa) Eddie Edwards; 6–3, 6–4	(United States) Todd Witsken	(United States) Jeff Arons (South Africa) Gary Muller	(United States) Glenn Layendecker (United States) Andy Kohlberg (United States) Bud Cox (United States) Bruce Manson
April 29	Berkeley Challenger (United States) Berkeley, USA $25,000 – hard – 64S/32D; Singles draw – Doubles draw	(United States) Glenn Layendecker (Canada) Glenn Michibata; 6–4, 6–7, 7–5	(United States) Matt Doyle (United States) John Mattke	(United States) Jeff Arons (South Africa) Gary Muller	(United States) Glenn Layendecker (United States) Andy Kohlberg (United States) Bud Cox (United States) Bruce Manson
April 29	Nagoya Challenger; Nagoya, Japan $25,000 – hard – 32S/16D; Singles draw – Doubles draw	(Japan) Tsuyoshi Fukui; 6–2, 6–3	(Finland) Leo Palin	(Japan) Shozo Shiraishi (United States) Joel Bailey	(Japan) Takayoshi Shibuya (Japan) Hitoshi Shirato (Japan) Shinichi Sakamoto (United States) Mark Wooldridge
April 29	Nagoya Challenger; Nagoya, Japan $25,000 – hard – 32S/16D; Singles draw – Doubles draw	(India) Sashi Menon (United States) Erik Van't Hof; 6–3, 6–2	(Japan) Hitoshi Shirato (Japan) Eiji Takeuchi	(Japan) Shozo Shiraishi (United States) Joel Bailey	(Japan) Takayoshi Shibuya (Japan) Hitoshi Shirato (Japan) Shinichi Sakamoto (United States) Mark Wooldridge
April 29	Parioli Challenger; Rome, Italy $25,000 – clay – 32S/16D; Singles draw – Doubles draw	(Argentina) Guillermo Rivas; 7–6, 1–6, 7–6	(Italy) Simone Colombo	(Switzerland) Claudio Mezzadri (Italy) Alessandro de Minicis	(Israel) Amos Mansdorf (Socialist Federal Republic of Yugoslavia) Bruno Orešar (Italy) Massimo Cierro (Czechoslovakia) Josef Čihák
April 29	Parioli Challenger; Rome, Italy $25,000 – clay – 32S/16D; Singles draw – Doubles draw	(Switzerland) Claudio Mezzadri (Italy) Patrizio Parrini; 6–4, 3–6, 6–4	(Italy) Paolo Canè (Italy) Simone Colombo	(Switzerland) Claudio Mezzadri (Italy) Alessandro de Minicis	(Israel) Amos Mansdorf (Socialist Federal Republic of Yugoslavia) Bruno Orešar (Italy) Massimo Cierro (Czechoslovakia) Josef Čihák

=== May ===
Week of	Tournament	Champions	Runners-up	Semifinalists	Quarterfinalists
May 6	No tournaments scheduled.				
May 13	Spring Challenger (United States) Spring, USA $25,000 – hard – 32S/16D; Singles draw – Doubles draw	(United States) Gary Donnelly; 5–7, 6–4, 7–6	(United States) Lloyd Bourne	(United States) Harold Solomon (United States) David Dowlen	(United States) Glenn Layendecker (United States) Jon Levine (United States) Roger Knapp (United States) Todd Nelson
May 13	Spring Challenger (United States) Spring, USA $25,000 – hard – 32S/16D; Singles draw – Doubles draw	(United States) Rill Baxter (Canada) Glenn Michibata; 6–4, 6–3	(United States) Roger Knapp (United States) Mark Wooldridge	(United States) Harold Solomon (United States) David Dowlen	(United States) Glenn Layendecker (United States) Jon Levine (United States) Roger Knapp (United States) Todd Nelson
May 20	No tournaments scheduled.				
May 27	No tournaments scheduled.				

=== June ===
Week of	Tournament	Champions	Runners-up	Semifinalists	Quarterfinalists
June 3	Tampere Open; Tampere, Finland $25,000 – clay – 32S/16D; Singles draw – Doubles draw	(Sweden) Jonas Svensson; 7–5, 7–5	(Italy) Massimo Cierro	(New Zealand) Kelly Evernden (Italy) Alessandro de Minicis	(Sweden) Stefan Eriksson (Czechoslovakia) Milan Šrejber (Brazil) Carlos Kirmayr (Czechoslovakia) Josef Čihák
June 3	Tampere Open; Tampere, Finland $25,000 – clay – 32S/16D; Singles draw – Doubles draw	(Brazil) Dácio Campos (Italy) Alessandro de Minicis; 6–4, 1–6, 6–3	(Brazil) Carlos Kirmayr (Brazil) Luiz Mattar	(New Zealand) Kelly Evernden (Italy) Alessandro de Minicis	(Sweden) Stefan Eriksson (Czechoslovakia) Milan Šrejber (Brazil) Carlos Kirmayr (Czechoslovakia) Josef Čihák
June 10	Dortmund Challenger; Dortmund, West Germany $25,000 – clay – 48S/24D; Singles draw – Doubles draw	(Mexico) Francisco Maciel; 7–6, 6–2	(Argentina) Eduardo Masso	(Spain) Juan Avendaño (West Germany) Jaromir Becka	(United States) Bruce Foxworth (Socialist Federal Republic of Yugoslavia) Bruno Orešar (Sweden) Peter Svensson (West Germany) Tore Meinecke
June 10	Dortmund Challenger; Dortmund, West Germany $25,000 – clay – 48S/24D; Singles draw – Doubles draw	(Australia) Antony Emerson (Australia) Mark Woodforde; 7–6, 6–2	(Australia) Russell Barlow (United States) Mark Buckley	(Spain) Juan Avendaño (West Germany) Jaromir Becka	(United States) Bruce Foxworth (Socialist Federal Republic of Yugoslavia) Bruno Orešar (Sweden) Peter Svensson (West Germany) Tore Meinecke
June 17	Bergen-1 Challenger; Bergen, Norway $25,000 – clay – 32S/16D; Singles draw – Doubles draw	(Sweden) Jonas Svensson; 6–2, 7–6	(Sweden) Peter Svensson	(Sweden) Stefan Eriksson (Sweden) Peter Lundgren	(Sweden) Christer Allgårdh (Italy) Massimo Cierro (Italy) Alessandro de Minicis (Austria) Thomas Muster
June 17	Bergen-1 Challenger; Bergen, Norway $25,000 – clay – 32S/16D; Singles draw – Doubles draw	(Sweden) Peter Svensson (Sweden) Jonas Svensson; 7–6, 4–6, 6–3	(Sweden) Stefan Eriksson (Sweden) Peter Lundgren	(Sweden) Stefan Eriksson (Sweden) Peter Lundgren	(Sweden) Christer Allgårdh (Italy) Massimo Cierro (Italy) Alessandro de Minicis (Austria) Thomas Muster
June 24	No tournaments scheduled.				

=== July ===
Week of	Tournament	Champions	Runners-up	Semifinalists	Quarterfinalists
June 1	OTB Open (United States) Schenectady, USA $25,000 – hard – 32S/16D; Singles draw – Doubles draw	(South Africa) Marius Masencamp; 6–0, 3–6, 6–3	(United States) Harold Solomon	(United States) Cary Stansbury (United States) Norm Schellenger	(United States) Tom Cain (United States) Patrick McEnroe (United States) Steve DeVries (United States) Mark Wooldridge
June 1	OTB Open (United States) Schenectady, USA $25,000 – hard – 32S/16D; Singles draw – Doubles draw	(United States) Andy Andrews (United States) Tomm Warneke; 6–4, 7–6	(United States) Fred Perrin (United States) Norm Schellenger	(United States) Cary Stansbury (United States) Norm Schellenger	(United States) Tom Cain (United States) Patrick McEnroe (United States) Steve DeVries (United States) Mark Wooldridge
July 8	No tournaments scheduled.				
July 15	Campos Challenger; Campos, Brazil $25,000 – hard – 32S/16D; Singles draw – Doubles draw	(Brazil) Dácio Campos; 6–7, 6–3, 6–2	(Brazil) Nelson Aerts	(Brazil) João Soares (Brazil) Carlos Kirmayr	(Brazil) Luiz Mattar (Brazil) Roger Guedes (Argentina) Thomas Stålhandske (Chile) Pedro Rebolledo
July 15	Campos Challenger; Campos, Brazil $25,000 – hard – 32S/16D; Singles draw – Doubles draw	(Brazil) Dácio Campos (Brazil) Carlos Kirmayr; 6–4, 3–6, 6–4	(Brazil) Luiz Mattar (Chile) Belus Prajoux	(Brazil) João Soares (Brazil) Carlos Kirmayr	(Brazil) Luiz Mattar (Brazil) Roger Guedes (Argentina) Thomas Stålhandske (Chile) Pedro Rebolledo
June 22	PTT İstanbul Cup; Istanbul, Turkey $25,000 – clay – 32S/16D; Singles draw – Doubles draw	(Romania) Florin Segărceanu; 6–4, 6–3	(Romania) Andrei Dîrzu	(Soviet Union) Andrei Chesnokov (Argentina) Eduardo Masso	(United States) Bruce Foxworth (Romania) Adrian Marcu (Czechoslovakia) Milan Šrejber (United Kingdom) Jeremy Bates
June 22	PTT İstanbul Cup; Istanbul, Turkey $25,000 – clay – 32S/16D; Singles draw – Doubles draw	(United Kingdom) Leighton Alfred (Netherlands) Tom Nijssen; 6–2, 6–3	(Argentina) Gustavo Luza (Argentina) Eduardo Masso	(Soviet Union) Andrei Chesnokov (Argentina) Eduardo Masso	(United States) Bruce Foxworth (Romania) Adrian Marcu (Czechoslovakia) Milan Šrejber (United Kingdom) Jeremy Bates
July 29	Neu-Ulm Challenger; Neu-Ulm, West Germany $25,000 – clay – 48S/24D; Singles draw – Doubles draw	(Czechoslovakia) Milan Šrejber; 0–6, 6–4, 6–2	(Sweden) Kent Carlsson	(Czechoslovakia) Josef Čihák (United States) Sandy Mayer	(Spain) David de Miguel (Czechoslovakia) Karel Nováček (Brazil) Ivan Kley (West Germany) Eric Jelen
July 29	Neu-Ulm Challenger; Neu-Ulm, West Germany $25,000 – clay – 48S/24D; Singles draw – Doubles draw	(New Zealand) David Mustard (United Kingdom) Jonathan Smith; 6–3, 4–6, 6–4	(West Germany) Tore Meinecke (West Germany) Ricki Osterthun	(Czechoslovakia) Josef Čihák (United States) Sandy Mayer	(Spain) David de Miguel (Czechoslovakia) Karel Nováček (Brazil) Ivan Kley (West Germany) Eric Jelen

=== August ===
Week of	Tournament	Champions	Runners-up	Semifinalists	Quarterfinalists
August 5	Nielsen Pro Tennis Championship (United States) Winnetka, USA $25,000 – hard – 32S/16D; Singles draw – Doubles draw	(South Africa) Barry Moir; 2–6, 7–5, 6–2	(United States) Harold Solomon	(United States) Andy Andrews (Canada) Glenn Michibata	(Sweden) Mikael Pernfors (United States) Bruce Brescia (South Africa) Michael Robertson (New Zealand) Kelly Evernden
August 5	Nielsen Pro Tennis Championship (United States) Winnetka, USA $25,000 – hard – 32S/16D; Singles draw – Doubles draw	(United States) Ricky Brown (United States) Luke Jensen; 6–4, 6–7, 6–4	(New Zealand) Kelly Evernden (South Africa) Brian Levine	(United States) Andy Andrews (Canada) Glenn Michibata	(Sweden) Mikael Pernfors (United States) Bruce Brescia (South Africa) Michael Robertson (New Zealand) Kelly Evernden
August 9	Ostend Challenger; Ostend, Belgium $25,000 – clay – 32S/16D; Singles draw – Doubles draw	(Socialist Federal Republic of Yugoslavia) Bruno Orešar; 6–4, 7–6	(Spain) Juan Antonio Rodríguez	(Argentina) Eduardo Masso (Australia) Simon Youl	(Spain) Jorge Bardou (Spain) David de Miguel (United States) Larry Scott (Argentina) Gustavo Luza
August 9	Ostend Challenger; Ostend, Belgium $25,000 – clay – 32S/16D; Singles draw – Doubles draw	(Belgium) Alain Brichant (Belgium) Jan Vanlangendonck; 6–2, 6–2	(Italy) Massimo Cierro (Brazil) Ivan Kley	(Argentina) Eduardo Masso (Australia) Simon Youl	(Spain) Jorge Bardou (Spain) David de Miguel (United States) Larry Scott (Argentina) Gustavo Luza
August 19	No tournaments scheduled.				
August 26	No tournaments scheduled.				

=== September ===
Week of	Tournament	Champions	Runners-up	Semifinalists	Quarterfinalists
September 2	International Tournament of Messina; Messina, Italy $50,000 – clay – 32S/16D; Singles draw – Doubles draw	(Sweden) Kent Carlsson; 6–2, 7–6	(Haiti) Ronald Agénor	(Spain) Sergio Casal (Switzerland) Claudio Mezzadri	(Spain) Gabriel Urpí (Spain) David de Miguel (Spain) Emilio Sánchez (Sweden) Ronnie Båthman
September 2	International Tournament of Messina; Messina, Italy $50,000 – clay – 32S/16D; Singles draw – Doubles draw	(Spain) Jesus Colas (Spain) David de Miguel; 6–1, 7–6	(New Zealand) Bruce Derlin (United Kingdom) David Felgate	(Spain) Sergio Casal (Switzerland) Claudio Mezzadri	(Spain) Gabriel Urpí (Spain) David de Miguel (Spain) Emilio Sánchez (Sweden) Ronnie Båthman
September 9	Thessaloniki Challenger; Thessaloniki, Greece $25,000 – hard – 32S/16D; Singles draw – Doubles draw	(Sweden) Peter Lundgren; 3–6, 6–3, 7–6	(Socialist Federal Republic of Yugoslavia) Slobodan Živojinović	(Italy) Gianluca Pozzi (Sweden) Jörgen Windahl	(Canada) Hatem McDadi (Mexico) Guillermo Stevens (Nigeria) Tony Mmoh (Netherlands) Menno Oosting
September 9	Thessaloniki Challenger; Thessaloniki, Greece $25,000 – hard – 32S/16D; Singles draw – Doubles draw	(Switzerland) Stephan Medem (India) Srinivasan Vasudevan; 6–3, 5–7, 6–3	(South Africa) Brian Levine (United States) Billy Nealon	(Italy) Gianluca Pozzi (Sweden) Jörgen Windahl	(Canada) Hatem McDadi (Mexico) Guillermo Stevens (Nigeria) Tony Mmoh (Netherlands) Menno Oosting
September 16	No tournaments scheduled.				
September 23	West Palm Challenger (United States) West Palm, USA $25,000 – clay – 32S/16D; Singles draw – Doubles draw	(Canada) Martin Wostenholme; 6–2, 1–6, 6–4	(Peru) Jaime Yzaga	(United States) Harold Solomon (South Africa) Derek Tarr	(South Africa) Gary Muller (Mexico) Leonardo Lavalle (Brazil) Nelson Aerts (South Africa) Barry Moir
September 23	West Palm Challenger (United States) West Palm, USA $25,000 – clay – 32S/16D; Singles draw – Doubles draw	(South Africa) Derek Tarr (United States) Erik Van't Hof; 6–2, 6–0	(Mexico) Leonardo Lavalle (Peru) Jaime Yzaga	(United States) Harold Solomon (South Africa) Derek Tarr	(South Africa) Gary Muller (Mexico) Leonardo Lavalle (Brazil) Nelson Aerts (South Africa) Barry Moir
September 30	No tournaments scheduled.				

=== October ===
Week of	Tournament	Champions	Runners-up	Semifinalists	Quarterfinalists
October 7	No tournaments scheduled.				
October 14	No tournaments scheduled.				
October 21	BH Tennis Open International Cup; Belo Horizonte, Brazil $25,000 – clay – 32S/16D; Singles draw – Doubles draw	(Austria) Thomas Muster; 6–1, 6–4	(Peru) Carlos di Laura	(France) Jean-Philippe Fleurian (Italy) Claudio Pistolesi	(Brazil) Nelson Aerts (Brazil) Ivan Kley (Peru) Jaime Yzaga (Brazil) Carlos Kirmayr
October 21	BH Tennis Open International Cup; Belo Horizonte, Brazil $25,000 – clay – 32S/16D; Singles draw – Doubles draw	(Italy) Massimo Cierro (Brazil) Júlio Góes; 6–3, 6–4	(Brazil) Givaldo Barbosa (Brazil) Ivan Kley	(France) Jean-Philippe Fleurian (Italy) Claudio Pistolesi	(Brazil) Nelson Aerts (Brazil) Ivan Kley (Peru) Jaime Yzaga (Brazil) Carlos Kirmayr
October 28	Bergen-2 Challenger; Bergen, Norway $25,000 – hard (I) – 32S/16D; Singles draw – Doubles draw	(Sweden) Peter Lundgren; 5–7, 7–6, 7–6	(Sweden) Jan Gunnarsson	(France) Thierry Champion (West Germany) Eric Jelen	(France) Éric Winogradsky (United States) Andy Kohlberg (Sweden) Stefan Simonsson (Sweden) Stefan Eriksson
October 28	Bergen-2 Challenger; Bergen, Norway $25,000 – hard (I) – 32S/16D; Singles draw – Doubles draw	(Greece) George Kalovelonis (United States) John Letts; 7–5, 6–3	(Sweden) Peter Carlsson (Sweden) Johan Carlsson	(France) Thierry Champion (West Germany) Eric Jelen	(France) Éric Winogradsky (United States) Andy Kohlberg (Sweden) Stefan Simonsson (Sweden) Stefan Eriksson
October 28	Porto Alegre Challenger; Porto Alegre, Brazil $25,000 – clay – 32S/16D; Singles draw – Doubles draw	(Sweden) Mikael Pernfors; 6–2, 6–3	(Czechoslovakia) Karel Nováček	(Argentina) Eduardo Masso (Peru) Carlos di Laura	(Brazil) César Kist (Spain) Jordi Arrese (Argentina) Gustavo Guerrero (Ecuador) Raúl Viver
October 28	Porto Alegre Challenger; Porto Alegre, Brazil $25,000 – clay – 32S/16D; Singles draw – Doubles draw	(Netherlands) Tom Nijssen (Netherlands) Johan Vekemans; 6–4, 2–6, 7–6	(Switzerland) Claudio Mezzadri (West Germany) Ivo Werner	(Argentina) Eduardo Masso (Peru) Carlos di Laura	(Brazil) César Kist (Spain) Jordi Arrese (Argentina) Gustavo Guerrero (Ecuador) Raúl Viver

=== November ===
Week of	Tournament	Champions	Runners-up	Semifinalists	Quarterfinalists
November 4	Curitiba-2 Challenger; Curitiba, Brazil $25,000 – clay – 32S/16D; Singles draw – Doubles draw	(Brazil) Júlio Góes; 6–4, 6–4	(Czechoslovakia) Milan Šrejber	(Czechoslovakia) Karel Nováček (Spain) Juan Avendaño	(Sweden) Mikael Pernfors (West Germany) Alex Stepanek (France) Jean-Philippe Fleurian (Brazil) João Soares
November 4	Curitiba-2 Challenger; Curitiba, Brazil $25,000 – clay – 32S/16D; Singles draw – Doubles draw	(Brazil) Nelson Aerts (Brazil) Alexandre Hocevar; 7–6, 6–4	(Netherlands) Tom Nijssen (Netherlands) Johan Vekemans	(Czechoslovakia) Karel Nováček (Spain) Juan Avendaño	(Sweden) Mikael Pernfors (West Germany) Alex Stepanek (France) Jean-Philippe Fleurian (Brazil) João Soares
November 11	Helsinki Challenger; Helsinki, Finland $25,000 – hard (I) – 32S/16D; Singles draw – Doubles draw	(Soviet Union) Andrei Chesnokov; 4–6, 6–0, 6–3	(West Germany) Eric Jelen	(Sweden) Johan Carlsson (West Germany) Patrik Kühnen	(Sweden) Conny Falk (France) Tarik Benhabiles (Nigeria) Tony Mmoh (United States) Andy Kohlberg
November 11	Helsinki Challenger; Helsinki, Finland $25,000 – hard (I) – 32S/16D; Singles draw – Doubles draw	(Sweden) Ronnie Båthman (Sweden) Stefan Eriksson; 6–4, 3–6, 6–4	(Denmark) Morten Christensen (West Germany) Patrik Kühnen	(Sweden) Johan Carlsson (West Germany) Patrik Kühnen	(Sweden) Conny Falk (France) Tarik Benhabiles (Nigeria) Tony Mmoh (United States) Andy Kohlberg
November 11	São Paulo Challenger; São Paulo, Brazil $25,000 – clay – 32S/16D; Singles draw – Doubles draw	(Mexico) Francisco Maciel; 6–3, 6–3	(Brazil) Cássio Motta	(Spain) José López-Maeso (Peru) Jaime Yzaga	(Brazil) César Kist (Brazil) Nelson Aerts (Brazil) Marcelo Hennemann (Czechoslovakia) Milan Šrejber
November 11	São Paulo Challenger; São Paulo, Brazil $25,000 – clay – 32S/16D; Singles draw – Doubles draw	(Brazil) Carlos Kirmayr (Brazil) Cássio Motta; 6–4, 3–6, 7–6	(Brazil) Ney Keller (Brazil) Mauro Menezes	(Spain) José López-Maeso (Peru) Jaime Yzaga	(Brazil) César Kist (Brazil) Nelson Aerts (Brazil) Marcelo Hennemann (Czechoslovakia) Milan Šrejber
November 18	No tournaments scheduled.				
November 25	Bahia Challenger; Bahia, Brazil $75,000 – hard – 32S/16D; Singles draw – Doubles draw	(Peru) Jaime Yzaga; 6–2, 6–0	(Brazil) Carlos Kirmayr	(Argentina) Martín Jaite (Sweden) Peter Lundgren	(Argentina) Horacio de la Peña (Brazil) César Kist (Chile) Ricardo Acuña (Spain) Juan Avendaño
November 25	Bahia Challenger; Bahia, Brazil $75,000 – hard – 32S/16D; Singles draw – Doubles draw	(Czechoslovakia) Josef Čihák (Netherlands) Tom Nijssen; 6–4, 6–3	(Paraguay) Víctor Pecci (Spain) Emilio Sánchez	(Argentina) Martín Jaite (Sweden) Peter Lundgren	(Argentina) Horacio de la Peña (Brazil) César Kist (Chile) Ricardo Acuña (Spain) Juan Avendaño

=== December ===
Week of	Tournament	Champions	Runners-up	Semifinalists	Quarterfinalists
December 2	Rio de Janeiro-2 Challenger; Rio de Janeiro, Brazil $25,000 – clay – 32S/16D; Singles draw – Doubles draw	(Paraguay) Víctor Pecci; 6–2, 6–7, 6–3	(Brazil) César Kist	(Spain) José López-Maeso (Argentina) Gustavo Guerrero	(Uruguay) Diego Pérez (Spain) Emilio Sánchez (United States) Jim Gurfein (Czechoslovakia) Milan Šrejber
December 2	Rio de Janeiro-2 Challenger; Rio de Janeiro, Brazil $25,000 – clay – 32S/16D; Singles draw – Doubles draw	(Peru) Carlos di Laura (Spain) Emilio Sánchez; 4–6, 6–4, 6–2	(Argentina) Gustavo Guerrero (Argentina) Gustavo Tiberti	(Spain) José López-Maeso (Argentina) Gustavo Guerrero	(Uruguay) Diego Pérez (Spain) Emilio Sánchez (United States) Jim Gurfein (Czechoslovakia) Milan Šrejber

== Statistical information ==
These tables present the number of singles (S) and doubles (D) titles won by each player and each nation during the season, within all the tournament categories of the 1985 ATP Challenger Series. The players/nations are sorted by: (1) total number of titles (a doubles title won by two players representing the same nation counts as only one win for the nation); (2) a singles > doubles hierarchy; (3) alphabetical order (by family names for players).

=== Titles won by player ===
Total	Player	S	D
5	Jonas Svensson (SWE)	3	2
4	Dácio Campos (BRA)	1	3
3	Júlio Góes (BRA)	2	1
3	Hans Gildemeister (CHI)	1	2
3	Tom Nijssen (NED)	0	3
2	Peter Lundgren (SWE)	2	0
2	Francisco Maciel (MEX)	2	0
2	Givaldo Barbosa (BRA)	1	1
2	Víctor Pecci (PAR)	1	1
2	Andy Andrews (USA)	0	2
2	Ronnie Båthman (SWE)	0	2
2	Carlos Kirmayr (BRA)	0	2
2	Sashi Menon (IND)	0	2
2	Claudio Mezzadri (SUI)	0	2
2	Glenn Michibata (CAN)	0	2
2	Emilio Sánchez (ESP)	0	2
2	Erik Van't Hof (USA)	0	2
2	Tomm Warneke (USA)	0	2
1	Ronald Agénor (HAI)	1	0
1	Juan Avendaño (ESP)	1	0
1	Kent Carlsson (SWE)	1	0
1	Andrei Chesnokov (URS)	1	0
1	Gary Donnelly (USA)	1	0
1	Eddie Edwards (RSA)	1	0
1	Tsuyoshi Fukui (JPN)	1	0
1	Shlomo Glickstein (ISR)	1	0
1	Hans-Peter Kandler (AUT)	1	0
1	Andy Kohlberg (USA)	1	0
1	Leonardo Lavalle (MEX)	1	0
1	Fernando Luna (ESP)	1	0
1	Marius Masencamp (RSA)	1	0
1	Barry Moir (RSA)	1	0
1	Thomas Muster (AUT)	1	0
1	Gianni Ocleppo (ITA)	1	0
1	Nduka Odizor (NGR)	1	0
1	Bruno Orešar (YUG)	1	0
1	Mikael Pernfors (SWE)	1	0
1	Guillermo Rivas (ARG)	1	0
1	Hans Schwaier (FRG)	1	0
1	Florin Segărceanu (ROU)	1	0
1	Milan Šrejber (TCH)	1	0
1	Gabriel Urpi (ESP)	1	0
1	Martin Wostenholme (CAN)	1	0
1	Jaime Yzaga (PER)	1	0
1	Egan Adams (USA)	0	1
1	Nelson Aerts (BRA)	0	1
1	Richard Akel (USA)	0	1
1	Leighton Alfred (GBR)	0	1
1	Anand Amritraj (IND)	0	1
1	Jeff Arons (USA)	0	1
1	Rill Baxter (USA)	0	1
1	Lloyd Bourne (USA)	0	1
1	Alain Brichant (BEL)	0	1
1	Ricky Brown (USA)	0	1
1	Paolo Canè (ITA)	0	1
1	Peter Carlsson (SWE)	0	1
1	Sergio Casal (ESP)	0	1
1	Massimo Cierro (ITA)	0	1
1	Josef Čihák (TCH)	0	1
1	Jesus Colas (ESP)	0	1
1	David de Miguel (ESP)	0	1
1	Alessandro de Minicis (ITA)	0	1
1	Carlos di Laura (PER)	0	1
1	Chris Dunk (USA)	0	1
1	Antony Emerson (AUS)	0	1
1	Stefan Eriksson (SWE)	0	1
1	Alexandre Hocevar (BRA)	0	1
1	Luke Jensen (USA)	0	1
1	George Kalovelonis (GRE)	0	1
1	Ivan Kley (BRA)	0	1
1	Glenn Layendecker (USA)	0	1
1	John Letts (USA)	0	1
1	Amos Mansdorf (ISR)	0	1
1	Bruce Manson (USA)	0	1
1	Luiz Mattar (BRA)	0	1
1	John Mattke (USA)	0	1
1	Stephan Medem (SUI)	0	1
1	Cássio Motta (BRA)	0	1
1	David Mustard (NZL)	0	1
1	Patrizio Parrini (ITA)	0	1
1	Belus Prajoux (CHI)	0	1
1	Jonathan Smith (GBR)	0	1
1	Charles Strode (USA)	0	1
1	Peter Svensson (SWE)	0	1
1	Derek Tarr (RSA)	0	1
1	Magnus Tideman (SWE)	0	1
1	Jan Vanlangendonck (BEL)	0	1
1	Srinivasan Vasudevan (IND)	0	1
1	Johan Vekemans (NED)	0	1
1	Mark Woodforde (AUS)	0	1
1	Mark Wooldridge (USA)	0	1

=== Titles won by nation ===
Total	Nation	S	D
16	United States (USA)	2	14
11	Sweden (SWE)	7	4
11	Brazil (BRA)	4	7
6	Spain (ESP)	3	3
5	India (IND)	0	5
4	South Africa (RSA)	3	1
4	Italy (ITA)	1	3
3	Mexico (MEX)	3	0
3	Canada (CAN)	1	2
3	Chile (CHI)	1	2
3	Netherlands (NED)	0	3
3	Switzerland (SUI)	0	3
2	Austria (AUT)	2	0
2	Czechoslovakia (TCH)	1	1
2	Israel (ISR)	1	1
2	Paraguay (PAR)	1	1
2	Peru (PER)	1	1
2	Great Britain (GBR)	0	2
1	Argentina (ARG)	1	0
1	Haiti (HAI)	1	0
1	Japan (JPN)	1	0
1	Nigeria (NGR)	1	0
1	Romania (ROU)	1	0
1	Soviet Union (URS)	1	0
1	West Germany (FRG)	1	0
1	Yugoslavia (YUG)	1	0
1	Australia (AUS)	0	1
1	Belgium (BEL)	0	1
1	Greece (GRE)	0	1
1	New Zealand (NZL)	0	1

== See also ==
- 1985 Grand Prix
- Association of Tennis Professionals
- International Tennis Federation
