= Howard Sands =

American tennis player

- Full name: Howard G. Sands
- Country (sports): United States
- Born: February 5, 1962 (age 63); Santa Monica, California, U.S.
- Plays: Right-handed

Singles
- Career record: 5–10
- Highest ranking: No. 142 (October 15, 1984)

Grand Slam singles results
- Australian Open: 1R (1984)

Doubles
- Career record: 6–12
- Highest ranking: No. 99 (September 24, 1984)

Grand Slam doubles results
- Australian Open: 1R (1984)
- US Open: 2R (1984)

Howard G. Sands (born February 5, 1962) is a former professional tennis player from the United States.

== Biography ==
Sands, the son of lawyers, is originally from Santa Monica, California.

While competing as junior he had a win over Mats Wilander, in the boys' singles at the 1980 Wimbledon Championships.

A three time singles All-American tennis player at Harvard University, Sands graduated in 1983 with an economics degree, then competed for two years on the professional tour. He featured in the men's doubles main draw at the 1984 US Open with Sean Brawley to make the second round and soon after reached his highest doubles ranking of 99 in the world. At the 1984 Australian Open he lost to Drew Gitlin in the opening round of the singles and also featured in men's doubles with John Mattke, for another first round exit.

He is the founding partner of a private investment company and is based in Los Angeles.
