= Dale Houston (tennis) =

Australian tennis player

- Full name: Dale Houston
- Country (sports): Australia
- Born: 15 November 1961 (age 63); Sydney, Australia
- Plays: Right-handed

Singles
- Career record: 2-3
- Career titles: 0
- Highest ranking: No. 280 (17 June 1985)

Grand Slam singles results
- Australian Open: 3R (1984)

Doubles
- Career record: 1-2
- Career titles: 0
- Highest ranking: No. 229 (24 June 1985)

Dale Houston (born 15 November 1961) is a former professional tennis player from Australia.

== Biography ==
Houston was born in Sydney but played his junior tennis in Queensland. In the early 1980s he took up a tennis scholarship to Wichita State University in Kansas. After graduating in June 1984 he competed for two years on the professional tour.

At the 1984 Australian Open, just months after turning professional, Houston made it through to the third round, where he lost a competitive match to the defending champion Mats Wilander. Playing as a qualifier, Houston had straight set victories over Craig Miller and former Australian Open winner Mark Edmondson, which put him up against the Swedish second seed in the third round. He managed to take Wilander to four sets, winning the second 6–2 and getting to a tiebreak in the third. Wilander won it in the fourth and went on to win the tournament.

Following his performances at the Australian Open, he gained entry to Grand Prix tournaments in Sydney and Melbourne, for a first round exit in each. In Melbourne he also competed in the doubles with John Frawley and made it to the quarter-finals.

In 1985 his appearances were restricted to Challengers, although he made it to the second round of qualifying at Wimbledon and played doubles at a Brisbane Grand Prix tournament. Mid-year he reached his highest ranking, 280 in the world. His loss to Mark Kratzmann in the Australian Open qualifying round that year was his final professional match.
