= Mika Hedman =

Finnish tennis player (born 1965)

- Country (sports): Finland
- Born: 14 June 1965 (age 59); Helsinki, Finland
- Height: 6 ft 1 in (185 cm)
- Prize money: $10,635

Singles
- Highest ranking: No. 415 (8 September 1986)

Grand Slam singles results
- Australian Open: Q3 (1984)

Doubles
- Career record: 0–2
- Highest ranking: No. 189 (28 July 1986)

Mika Hedman (born 14 June 1965) is a Finnish former professional tennis player.

== Career ==
The son of Davis Cup player Heikki Hedman competed on the professional tour in the 1980s. He himself represented the Finland Davis Cup team on one occasion, against Cyprus in 1987. In front of a home crowd in Helsinki, he partnered with Olli Rahnasto in the doubles rubber to defeat their Cypriot opponents in straight sets.

Hedman had a career high singles ranking of 415 and reached the final qualifying round at the 1984 Australian Open. In doubles he was ranked as high as 189 in the world, with two Grand Prix main draw appearance in 1986, at Hilversum and Kitzbühel.

== Challenger titles ==
=== Doubles: (1) ===
Year	Tournament	Surface	Partner	Opponents	Score
1987	Hanko, Finland	Clay	(Finland) Veli Paloheimo	(South Africa) Craig Campbell (Australia) Des Tyson	5–7, 6–3, 6–2

== See also ==
- List of Finland Davis Cup team representatives
