= John Mattke =

American tennis player

- Full name: John Mattke
- Country (sports): United States
- Born: October 29, 1958 (age 67) Minneapolis, Minnesota
- Plays: Right-handed

Singles
- Career record: 5–9
- Career titles: 0
- Highest ranking: No. 125 (February 4, 1985)

Grand Slam singles results
- Australian Open: 2R (1984)

Doubles
- Career record: 5–17
- Career titles: 0
- Highest ranking: No. 117 (January 2, 1984)

Grand Slam doubles results
- Australian Open: 1R (1984)
- US Open: 1R (1983, 1984)

John Mattke (born October 29, 1958) is a former professional tennis player from the United States.

== Biography ==
Mattke was born in Minneapolis and came to Gustavus Adolphus College in 1977. While studying for a business degree he spent four years on the college's tennis team. He finished with a 132-31 record in singles and was the 1980 NAIA singles champion. In doubles he was 135-20, having formed a strong doubles partnership with Paul Holbach, which culminated in them winning the 1980 NCAA Division III doubles championship.

In 1983 he had his first year touring as a professional and made a Grand Prix quarter-final in the Washington Open doubles, with Chile's Juan Carlos Ayala.

His most noteworthy performance came at the Tokyo Outdoor Grand Prix tournament in 1984 where in the second round he upset the world's fifth ranked player Andrés Gómez, who was also the tournament's top seed.

At the 1984 Australian Open, Mattke made his only main draw appearance in singles and had a four-set win over Paul Kronk in the first round, before losing to New Zealander Bruce Derlin.

He won two Challenger titles during his career, both in doubles.

Still living in Minnesota, Mattke works as an executive at granite company Coldspring.

== Challenger titles ==
=== Doubles: (2) ===
No.	Year	Tournament	Surface	Partner	Opponents	Score
1.	1983	Lagos, Nigeria	Hard	(United States) Wesley Cash	(United States) Jonathan Canter (United States) Joe Meyers	6–3, 3–6, 6–3
2.	1985	San Luis Potosí, Mexico	Clay	(India) Sashi Menon	(United States) Jeff Arons (United States) Richard Akel	7–6, 6–3
