= Pat Flynn (tennis) =

Australian tennis player and novelist

- Full name: Patrick Flynn
- Country (sports): Australia
- Born: 16 August 1968 (age 56); Brisbane, Queensland
- Height: 183 cm (6 ft 0 in)

Singles
- Career record: 0–1
- Highest ranking: No. 390 (3 March 1986)

Grand Slam singles results
- Australian Open: Q2 (1984)
- Wimbledon: Q2 (1985)

Doubles
- Highest ranking: No. 516 (9 June 1997)

Grand Slam doubles results
- Wimbledon: Q1 (1985)

Patrick Flynn (born 16 August 1968) is an Australian former professional tennis player. He is now a children's novelist.

Flynn was a junior singles finalist at the 1984 Australian Open, losing to Mark Kratzmann. He played college tennis for the University of Texas at Austin for four years and while competing on the professional tour had a best singles ranking of 390 in the world. In 1988 he won the Queensland Hardcourt Championships.
