= Corey Wittenberg =

American-Australian tennis player (1961–2022)

- Full name: Corey Michael Wittenberg Sr.
- Country (sports): United States
- Born: September 24, 1961
- Died: April 25, 2022 (aged 60)

Singles
- Career record: 0–1
- Highest ranking: No. 417 (March 18, 1985)

Grand Slam singles results
- Australian Open: 1R (1984)

Doubles
- Highest ranking: No. 334 (March 18, 1985)

Corey Wittenberg Sr. (September 24, 1961 – April 25, 2022) was an American-born Australian professional tennis player.

Wittenberg played college tennis for Texas Christian University and earned All-American honors for doubles in 1983.

At the 1984 Australian Open, Wittenberg won his way through qualifying and faced John Sadri in the first round, losing the match in four sets. He later settled in Australia.

Wittenberg resided in Pymble. He died on April 25, 2022.
