= 1984 Australian Open – Men's doubles =

Men's doubles
- 1984 Australian Open

Final
- Champion: (Australia) Mark Edmondson; (United States) Sherwood Stewart
- Runner-up: (Sweden) Joakim Nyström; (Sweden) Mats Wilander
- Score: 6–2, 6–2, 7–5

Details
- Draw: 48
- Seeds: 16

Events
Singles	men	women		boys	girls
Doubles	men	women	mixed	boys	girls
WC Singles	men	women	quad
WC Doubles	men	women	quad
Legends	men	women	mixed
- Australian Open

The men's doubles tournament at the 1984 Australian Open was held from 26 November through 9 December 1984 on the outdoor grass courts at the Kooyong Stadium in Melbourne, Australia. Mark Edmondson and Sherwood Stewart won the title, defeating Joakim Nyström and Mats Wilander in the final.

== Seeds ==
1. (Australia) Mark Edmondson / (Australia) Sherwood Stewart (champions)
2. (United States) Ken Flach / (United States) Robert Seguso (second round)
3. (South Africa) Kevin Curren / (United States) Steve Denton (third round)
4. (Australia) Pat Cash / (Australia) John Fitzgerald (semifinals)
5. (Australia) Broderick Dyke / (Australia) Wally Masur (quarterfinals)
6. (Paraguay) Francisco González / (United States) Matt Mitchell (quarterfinals)
7. (United States) Tim Gullikson / (United States) Tom Gullikson (second round)
8. (Australia) Brad Drewett / (Australia) Kim Warwick (third round)
9. (United States) Mike Bauer / (United States) Martin Davis (second round)
10. (Australia) Peter Doohan / (Australia) Michael Fancutt (semifinals)
11. (United States) Scott Davis / (United States) Ben Testerman (second round)
12. (Australia) David Graham / (Australia) Laurie Warder (second round)
13. (United States) Mike De Palmer / (United States) Sammy Giammalva (second round)
14. (Sweden) Joakim Nyström / (Sweden) Mats Wilander (final)
15. (Sweden) Stefan Edberg / (United States) Johan Kriek (third round)
16. (Australia) John Alexander / (United States) Lloyd Bourne (quarterfinals)

== Draw ==
Key

- Q = Qualifier
- WC = Wild card
- LL = Lucky loser
- Alt = Alternate
- ITF = ITF entry
- PR = Protected ranking
- SR = Special ranking
- SE = Special exempt
- JE = Junior exempt
- JR = Junior Accelerator Programme entrant
- CO = College Accelerator Programme entrant
- NG = Next Gen Accelerator Program entrant
- w/o = Walkover
- r = Retired
- d = Defaulted

=== Finals ===
Quarterfinals

Semifinals

Final

1
- (Australia) Mark Edmondson
- (United States) Sherwood Stewart
2
7
6
6
7

5
- (Australia) Broderick Dyke
- (Australia) Wally Masur
6
5
7
1
5

1
- (Australia) Mark Edmondson
- (United States) Sherwood Stewart
5
7
6
6

10
- (Australia) Peter Doohan
- (Australia) Michael Fancutt
7
5
3
4

10
- (Australia) Peter Doohan
- (Australia) Michael Fancutt
6
6
6

16
- (Australia) John Alexander
- (United States) Lloyd Bourne
4
3
4

1
- (Australia) Mark Edmondson
- (United States) Sherwood Stewart
6
6
7

14
- (Sweden) Joakim Nyström
- (Sweden) Mats Wilander
2
2
5

- (South Africa) Eddie Edwards
- (South Africa) Christo van Rensburg
6
6
4
6
3

4
- (Australia) Pat Cash
- (Australia) John Fitzgerald
3
7
6
3
6

4
- (Australia) Pat Cash
- (Australia) John Fitzgerald
4
4
6
3

14
- (Sweden) Joakim Nyström
- (Sweden) Mats Wilander
6
6
2
6

6
- (Paraguay) Francisco González
- (United States) Matt Mitchell
4
6
2
6
5

14
- (Sweden) Joakim Nyström
- (Sweden) Mats Wilander
6
4
6
1
7

=== Top half ===
==== Section 1 ====
First round

Second round

Third round

Quarterfinals

1
- (Australia) M Edmondson
- (United States) S Stewart
6
6

- (United States) T Delatte
- (United States) E Van't Hof
3
4

- (United States) A Andrews
- (United States) J Sadri
3
4

- (United States) A Andrews
- (United States) J Sadri
6
6

1
- (Australia) M Edmondson
- (United States) S Stewart
6
6

- (United States) J Mattke
- (United States) H Sands
4
6

- (United Kingdom) C Dowdeswell
- (United Kingdom) J Lloyd
3
4

- (United Kingdom) C Dowdeswell
- (United Kingdom) J Lloyd
6
7

- (United Kingdom) C Dowdeswell
- (United Kingdom) J Lloyd
4
7
9

13
- (United States) M De Palmer
- (United States) S Giammalva
6
4
7

1
- (Australia) M Edmondson
- (United States) S Stewart
2
7
6
6
7

5
- (Australia) B Dyke
- (Australia) W Masur
6
5
7
1
5

12
- (Australia) D Graham
- (Australia) L Warder
6
5

- (India) A Amritraj
- (United States) L Shiras
2
5

- (Israel) S Glickstein
- (Israel) S Perkiss
7
7

- (Israel) S Glickstein
- (Israel) S Perkiss
6
7

- (Israel) S Glickstein
- (Israel) S Perkiss
1
4

- (Australia) P McNamara
- (Australia) P McNamee
6
6
4

5
- (Australia) B Dyke
- (Australia) W Masur
6
6

- (West Germany) B Becker
- (West Germany) A Maurer
3
7
6

- (West Germany) B Becker
- (West Germany) A Maurer
5
5

5
- (Australia) B Dyke
- (Australia) W Masur
7
7

==== Section 2 ====
First round

Second round

Third round

Quarterfinals

3
- (South Africa) K Curren
- (United States) S Denton
4
6
6

- (Australia) B Custer
- (Australia) D Macpherson
6
6
6

- (Australia) B Custer
- (Australia) D Macpherson
6
3
4

- (United States) G Layendecker
- (United States) R Nixon
3
7
3

4
- (South Africa) K Curren
- (United States) S Denton
6
3
4

- (United States) B Gilbert
- (United States) C Hooper
6
4

10
- (Australia) P Doohan
- (Australia) M Fancutt
4
6
6

- (Australia) M Kratzmann
- (Australia) S Youl
7
6

- (Australia) M Kratzmann
- (Australia) S Youl
6
2

10
- (Australia) P Doohan
- (Australia) M Fancutt
7
6

10
- (Australia) P Doohan
- (Australia) M Fancutt
6
6
6

16
- (Australia) J Alexander
- (United States) L Bourne
4
3
4

16
- (Australia) J Alexander
- (United States) L Bourne
6
4
6

- (Australia) C Fancutt
- (Australia) G Whitecross
6
6

- (Australia) C Fancutt
- (Australia) G Whitecross
4
6
2

- (Australia) P Johston
- (Australia) J McCurdy
4
4

16
- (Australia) J Alexander
- (United States) L Bourne
6
6

- (United States) D Dowlen
- (United States) P Rennert
3
7
8

8
- (Australia) B Drewett
- (Australia) K Warwick
4
2

- (United States) B Levine
- (United States) C Wittus
6
6
6

- (United States) D Dowlen
- (United States) P Rennert
2
6

8
- (Australia) B Drewett
- (Australia) K Warwick
6
7

=== Bottom half ===
==== Section 3 ====
First round

Second round

Third round

Quarterfinals

7
- (United States) Ti Gullikson
- (United States) To Gullikson
6
7
4

- (United States) R Meyer
- (New Zealand) R Simpson
3
7
7

- (United States) R Meyer
- (New Zealand) R Simpson
7
5
6

- (United States) S McCain
- (United States) L Stefanki
6
5
5

- (United States) R Meyer
- (New Zealand) R Simpson
6
6
7

- (South Africa) E Edwards
- (South Africa) C van Rensburg
7
6

- (South Africa) E Edwards
- (South Africa) C van Rensburg
4
7
9

- (Australia) C Limberger
- (Australia) M Woodforde
6
2

- (South Africa) E Edwards
- (South Africa) C van Rensburg
6
6

9
- (United States) M Bauer
- (United States) M Davis
3
4

- (South Africa) E Edwards
- (South Africa) C van Rensburg
6
6
4
6
3

4
- (Australia) P Cash
- (Australia) J Fitzgerald
3
7
6
3
6

11
- (United States) S Davis
- (United States) B Testerman
6
6
18

- (Sweden) R Båthman
- (Sweden) S Simonsson
3
6

- (United States) D Gitlin
- (United States) H Pfister
2
7
20

- (United States) D Gitlin
- (United States) H Pfister
6
7

- (United States) D Gitlin
- (United States) H Pfister
6
6

- (Australia) C Miller
- (United States) E Sherbeck
6
7

4
- (Australia) P Cash
- (Australia) J Fitzgerald
7
7

- (France) G Forget
- (Switzerland) J Hlasek
4
6

- (Australia) C Miller
- (United States) E Sherbeck
7
4
4

4
- (Australia) P Cash
- (Australia) J Fitzgerald
6
6
6

==== Section 4 ====
First round

Second round

Third round

Quarterfinals

6
- (Paraguay) F González
- (United States) M Mitchell
6
6

- (United States) M Freeman
- (United States) D Saltz
6
6

- (United States) M Freeman
- (United States) D Saltz
4
2

- (Australia) D Cahill
- (Australia) D Carter
4
3

6
- (Paraguay) F González
- (United States) M Mitchell
7
6

- (New Zealand) D Mustard
- (United Kingdom) J Smith
3
4

15
- (Sweden) S Edberg
- (United States) J Kriek
6
3

- (United States) B Cox
- (United States) J Turpin
6
6

- (United States) B Cox
- (United States) J Turpin
3
4

15
- (Sweden) S Edberg
- (United States) J Kriek
6
6

6
- (Paraguay) F González
- (United States) M Mitchell
4
6
2
6
5

14
- (Sweden) J Nyström
- (Sweden) M Wilander
6
4
6
1
7

14
- (Sweden) J Nyström
- (Sweden) M Wilander
6
6

- (New Zealand) B Derlin
- (Netherlands) H van Boeckel
6
6
6

- (New Zealand) B Derlin
- (Netherlands) H van Boeckel
1
4

- (Australia) J Frawley
- (Australia) R Frawley
4
7
3

14
- (Sweden) J Nyström
- (Sweden) M Wilander
5
6
7

- (Australia) J Harty
- (Australia) D Tyson
6
6

- (India) V Amritraj
- (Czechoslovakia) I Lendl
7
3
5

- (India) V Amritraj
- (Czechoslovakia) I Lendl
7
7

- (India) V Amritraj
- (Czechoslovakia) I Lendl
3
6
6

2
- (United States) K Flach
- (United States) R Seguso
6
3
4
