= 1984 Australian Open – Women's singles =

Women's singles
- 1984 Australian Open

Final
- Champion: (United States) Chris Evert
- Runner-up: (Czechoslovakia) Helena Suková
- Score: 6–7^{(4–7)}, 6–1, 6–3

Details
- Draw: 64
- Seeds: 16

Events
Singles	men	women		boys	girls
Doubles	men	women	mixed	boys	girls
WC Singles	men	women	quad
WC Doubles	men	women	quad
Legends	men	women	mixed
- Australian Open

Chris Evert defeated Helena Suková in the final, 6–7^{(4–7)}, 6–1, 6–3 to win the women's singles tennis title at the 1984 Australian Open. It was her second Australian Open title and 16th major singles title overall, completing the double career Grand Slam. With her third round victory, Evert became the first player in the Open Era to win 1,000 matches. She finished the tournament with a 1,003-97 career match record.

Martina Navratilova was the defending champion, but was defeated in the semifinals by Suková. Navratilova entered the semifinals with a 74-match winning streak, having won the previous six major singles titles and attempting to complete the Grand Slam. Her 74-match win streak remains an Open Era record.

== Seeds ==
1. (United States) Martina Navratilova (semifinals)
2. (United States) Chris Evert (champion)
3. (United States) Pam Shriver (quarterfinals)
4. (Australia) Wendy Turnbull (semifinals)
5. (West Germany) Claudia Kohde-Kilsch (third round)
6. (United States) Zina Garrison (first round)
7. (Canada) Carling Bassett (first round)
8. (Hungary) Andrea Temesvári (third round)
9. (Czechoslovakia) Helena Suková (final)
10. (West Germany) Sylvia Hanika (second round)
11. (Sweden) Catarina Lindqvist (first round)
12. (United States) Barbara Potter (quarterfinals)
13. (United Kingdom) Jo Durie (second round)
14. (United States) Alycia Moulton (first round)
15. (United States) Kathy Rinaldi (third round)
16. (West Germany) Steffi Graf (third round)

== Draw ==
Key

- Q = Qualifier
- WC = Wild card
- LL = Lucky loser
- Alt = Alternate
- ITF = ITF entry
- PR = Protected ranking
- SR = Special ranking
- SE = Special exempt
- JE = Junior exempt
- JR = Junior Accelerator Programme entrant
- CO = College Accelerator Programme entrant
- NG = Next Gen Accelerator Program entrant
- w/o = Walkover
- r = Retired
- d = Defaulted

=== Finals ===
Quarterfinals
1	(United States) Martina Navratilova	6	6
12	(United States) Barbara Potter	3	2
3	(United States) Pam Shriver	2	7^{7}	1
9	(Czechoslovakia) Helena Suková	6	6^{5}	6
(United States) Sharon Walsh	5	2
4	(Australia) Wendy Turnbull	7	6
Q	(France) Sophie Amiach	2	1
2	(United States) Chris Evert	6	6

Semifinals
1	(United States) Martina Navratilova	6	3	5
9	(Czechoslovakia) Helena Suková	1	6	7
4	(Australia) Wendy Turnbull	3	3
2	(United States) Chris Evert	6	6

Final
9	(Czechoslovakia) Helena Suková	7^{7}	1	3
2	(United States) Chris Evert	6^{4}	6	6

=== Top half ===
==== Section 1 ====
First round
1	(United States) M Navratilova	6	6
(South Africa) Y Vermaak	1	1
Q	(United States) B Gerken	2	4
(United States) M-L Piatek	6	6
(South Africa) R Fairbank	6	6
(Sweden) C Karlsson	2	2
(United Kingdom) A Croft	4	2
15	(United States) K Rinaldi	6	6
12	(United States) B Potter	6	7^{8}
(United States) M Washington	2	6^{6}
WC	(Australia) J Byrne	6	7
(United States) S Foltz	1	5
(United States) W White	5	4
(United Kingdom) V Wade	7	6
(Australia) L Field	4	4
8	(Hungary) A Temesvári	6	6

Second round
1	(United States) M Navratilova	6	6
(United States) M-L Piatek	2	1
(South Africa) R Fairbank	3	2
15	(United States) K Rinaldi	6	6
12	(United States) B Potter	6	7^{7}
WC	(Australia) J Byrne	3	6^{1}
(United Kingdom) V Wade	6	0	2
8	(Hungary) A Temesvári	4	6	6

Third round
1	(United States) M Navratilova	4	6	6
15	(United States) K Rinaldi	6	0	1
12	(United States) B Potter	6	7
8	(Hungary) A Temesvári	4	5

Quarterfinals
1	(United States) M Navratilova	6	6
12	(United States) B Potter	3	2

==== Section 2 ====
First round
3	(United States) P Shriver	6	6
(United States) C Benjamin	4	3
Q	(United Kingdom) S Gomer	3	1
Q	(France) C Vanier	6	6
(West Germany) E Pfaff	2	4
(United States) A Leand	6	6
(Australia) E Minter	4	6	8
14	(United States) A Moulton	6	3	6
9	(Czechoslovakia) H Suková	6	6
(United States) E Burgin	1	3
WC	(Australia) D Balestrat	6	6
Q	(Soviet Union) S Cherneva	0	1
(United States) B Nagelsen	1	2
(West Germany) B Bunge	6	6
(United States) V Nelson	2	2
5	(West Germany) C Kohde-Kilsch	6	6

Second round
3	(United States) P Shriver	6	6
Q	(France) C Vanier	2	1
(United States) A Leand	6	3	2
(Australia) E Minter	2	6	6
9	(Czechoslovakia) H Suková	7	6
WC	(Australia) D Balestrat	5	2
(West Germany) B Bunge	2	4
5	(West Germany) C Kohde-Kilsch	6	6

Third round
3	(United States) P Shriver	6	6
(Australia) E Minter	2	2
9	(Czechoslovakia) H Suková	3	6	6
5	(West Germany) C Kohde-Kilsch	6	3	2

Quarterfinals
3	(United States) P Shriver	2	7^{7}	1
9	(Czechoslovakia) H Suková	6	6^{5}	6

=== Bottom half ===
==== Section 3 ====
First round
6	(United States) Z Garrison	6	4	7
(United States) S Walsh	4	6	9
Q	(Australia) C Carney	1	2
(Puerto Rico) G Fernández	6	6
(Argentina) A Villagrán	2	6	3
(Netherlands) M Mesker	6	3	6
(Australia) E Sayers	5	6	4
10	(West Germany) S Hanika	7	2	6
16	(West Germany) S Graf	6	6
(United States) S Collins	2	4
(United States) S Mascarin	3	3
Q	(United States) L Antonoplis	6	6
(West Germany) P Keppeler	2	1
(Czechoslovakia) I Budařová	6	6
Q	(Soviet Union) L Savchenko	2	1
4	(Australia) W Turnbull	6	6

Second round
(United States) S Walsh	6^{4}	6	6
(Puerto Rico) G Fernández	7^{7}	4	1
(Netherlands) M Mesker	3	6	6
10	(West Germany) S Hanika	6	4	3
16	(West Germany) S Graf	2	6	6
Q	(United States) L Antonoplis	6	1	0
(Czechoslovakia) I Budařová	4	1
4	(Australia) W Turnbull	6	6

Third round
(United States) S Walsh	6^{4}	7	8
(Netherlands) M Mesker	7^{7}	5	6
16	(West Germany) S Graf	4	4
4	(Australia) W Turnbull	6	6

Quarterfinals
(United States) S Walsh	5	2
4	(Australia) W Turnbull	7	6

==== Section 4 ====
First round
7	(Canada) C Bassett	1	6	4
(South Africa) B Mould	6	4	6
(Switzerland) L Drescher	6	5	6
Q	(France) S Amiach	4	7	8
(Denmark) T Scheuer-Larsen	6	6^{7}	1
(Switzerland) C Jolissaint	1	7^{9}	6
(Australia) A Minter	6	3	6
11	(Sweden) C Lindqvist	0	6	2
13	(United Kingdom) J Durie	6	5	6
(United States) A White	3	7	0
(France) P Paradis	6	6
(United States) B Herr	2	3
(France) C Tanvier	4	5
(West Germany) M Schropp	6	7
(United States) K Shaefer	0	2
2	(United States) C Evert	6	6

Second round
(South Africa) B Mould	3	5
Q	(France) S Amiach	6	7
(Switzerland) C Jolissaint	6	6
(Australia) A Minter	3	3
13	(United Kingdom) J Durie	7	3	4
(France) P Paradis	5	6	6
(West Germany) M Schropp	1	0
2	(United States) C Evert	6	6

Third round
Q	(France) S Amiach	6	6
(Switzerland) C Jolissaint	0	2
(France) P Paradis	1	7^{7}	2
2	(United States) C Evert	6	6^{5}	6

Quarterfinals
Q	(France) S Amiach	2	1
2	(United States) C Evert	6	6

Preceded by 1984 US Open – Women's singles	Grand Slam women's singles	Succeeded by 1985 French Open – Women's singles
