= 1984 Australian Open – Men's singles =

Men's singles
- 1984 Australian Open

Final
- Champion: (Sweden) Mats Wilander
- Runner-up: (South Africa) Kevin Curren
- Score: 6–7^{(5–7)}, 6–4, 7–6^{(7–3)}, 6–2

Details
- Draw: 96
- Seeds: 16

Events
Singles	men	women		boys	girls
Doubles	men	women	mixed	boys	girls
WC Singles	men	women	quad
WC Doubles	men	women	quad
Legends	men	women	mixed
- Australian Open

Defending champion Mats Wilander defeated Kevin Curren in the final, 6–7^{(5–7)}, 6–4, 7–6^{(7–3)}, 6–2 to win the men's singles tennis title at the 1984 Australian Open. It was his second Australian Open title and third major singles title overall.

== Seeds ==
The seeded players are listed below. Mats Wilander is the champion; others show the round in which they were eliminated.

1. (Czechoslovakia) Ivan Lendl (fourth round)
2. (Sweden) Mats Wilander (champion)
3. (Sweden) Joakim Nyström (fourth round)
4. (United States) Johan Kriek (semifinals)
5. (Australia) Pat Cash (quarterfinals)
6. (United States) Vitas Gerulaitis (second round)
7. (United States) Tim Mayotte (second round)
8. (Sweden) Stefan Edberg (quarterfinals)
9. (South Africa) Kevin Curren (final)
10. (United Kingdom) John Lloyd (second round)
11. (India) Ramesh Krishnan (third round)
12. (United States) Brad Gilbert (fourth round)
13. (United States) Mike Bauer (third round)
14. (United States) Ben Testerman (semifinals)
15. (India) Vijay Amritraj (second round)
16. (Czechoslovakia) Miloslav Mečíř (second round)

== Draw ==
Key

- Q = Qualifier
- WC = Wild card
- LL = Lucky loser
- Alt = Alternate
- ITF = ITF entry
- PR = Protected ranking
- SR = Special ranking
- SE = Special exempt
- JE = Junior exempt
- JR = Junior Accelerator Programme entrant
- CO = College Accelerator Programme entrant
- NG = Next Gen Accelerator Program entrant
- w/o = Walkover
- r = Retired
- d = Defaulted

=== Finals ===
Quarterfinals
9	(South Africa) Kevin Curren	7	6	6
(United States) Scott Davis	5	2	3
14	(United States) Ben Testerman	6	6	6
(West Germany) Boris Becker	4	3	4
5	(Australia) Pat Cash	5	1	6
4	(United States) Johan Kriek	7	6	7
8	(Sweden) Stefan Edberg	5	3	6	4
2	(Sweden) Mats Wilander	7	6	1	6

Semifinals
9	(South Africa) Kevin Curren	2	4	6	6	6
14	(United States) Ben Testerman	6	6	3	4	4
4	(United States) Johan Kriek	1	0	2
2	(Sweden) Mats Wilander	6	6	6

Final
9	(South Africa) Kevin Curren	7	4	6	2
2	(Sweden) Mats Wilander	6	6	7	6

=== Section 1 ===
First round
(United States) B Scanlon	3	7	7	6	6
(Australia) J Fitzgerald	6	5	5	7	2
(West Germany) E Jelen	6	6	4	1
(West Germany) HD Beutel	4	7	6	6
(South Africa) E Edwards	5	6	6	6
(United States) D Saltz	7	0	4	4
Q	(South Africa) B Levine	6	1	2
(Australia) W Masur	7	6	6

Second round
1	(Czechoslovakia) I Lendl	4	6	6	6
(United States) B Scanlon	6	4	4	1
(West Germany) HD Beutel	7	6	4	4	3
(France) T Benhabiles	5	4	6	6	6
(South Africa) E Edwards	7	7	6
(Australia) J Alexander	6	6	4
(Australia) W Masur	6	4	4	4
9	(South Africa) K Curren	4	6	6	6

Third round
1	(Czechoslovakia) I Lendl	2	6	6	6
(France) T Benhabiles	6	2	4	4
(South Africa) E Edwards	3	6	5	6
9	(South Africa) K Curren	6	4	7	7

Fourth round
1	(Czechoslovakia) I Lendl	1	6	4
9	(South Africa) K Curren	6	7	6

=== Section 2 ===
First round
(United States) H Sands	3	4	2
(United States) D Gitlin	6	6	6
(Australia) C Limberger	2	3	6	3
(West Germany) A Maurer	6	6	3	6
(United States) S Davis	7	7	6
WC	(Australia) M Kratzmann	5	5	4
Q	(Australia) B Dyke	4	3	4
(Paraguay) F González	6	6	6

Second round
12	(United States) B Gilbert	6	6	6
(United States) D Gitlin	1	2	2
(West Germany) A Maurer	7	7	7
(United States) P Annacone	6	6	6
(New Zealand) C Lewis	4	2	0
(United States) S Davis	6	6	6
(Paraguay) F González	7	6	6
6	(United States) V Gerulaitis	6	4	2

Third round
12	(United States) B Gilbert	3	7	7	7
(West Germany) A Maurer	6	6	6	5
(United States) S Davis	6	6	6
(Paraguay) F González	4	4	4

Fourth round
12	(United States) B Gilbert	3	5	6	4
(United States) S Davis	6	7	3	6

=== Section 3 ===
First round
Q	(Australia) G Whitecross	3	4	4
(United Kingdom) C Dowdeswell	6	6	6
Q	(Australia) D Cahill	6	1	6	7	6
(United States) R Harmon	7	6	4	6	2
(Israel) S Perkiss	4	6	6	6	6
Q	(Australia) M Fancutt	6	2	7	1	2
(United States) D Dowlen	6	2	4
(United States) M Freeman	7	6	6

Second round
3	(Sweden) J Nyström	6	6	6
(United Kingdom) C Dowdeswell	4	2	4
(United States) D Cassidy	7	6	7
Q	(Australia) D Cahill	6	3	6
(United States) M Mitchell	7	6	3	7
(Israel) S Perkiss	6	1	6	6
(United States) M Freeman	6	7	4	4
14	(United States) B Testerman	7	5	6	6

Third round
3	(Sweden) J Nyström	7	6	6
(United States) D Cassidy	6	4	3
(United States) M Mitchell	7	2	3	6	2
14	(United States) B Testerman	6	6	6	4	6

Fourth round
3	(Sweden) J Nyström	6	3	7	5
14	(United States) B Testerman	7	6	6	7

=== Section 4 ===
First round
(France) G Forget	6	7	7
(United States) J Turpin	2	6	5
WC	(Australia) K Warwick	3	7	7	6
(New Zealand) R Simpson	6	5	5	3
(United States) H Pfister	6	6	7
(United States) S Giammalva, Jr.	3	3	5
(West Germany) B Becker	6	6	6
LL	(United States) R Meyer	3	1	3

Second round
15	(India) V Amritraj	3	1	6
(France) G Forget	6	6	7
WC	(Australia) K Warwick	6	0^{r}
(Republic of Ireland) M Doyle	7	2
(United States) L Shiras	6	3	4	2
(United States) H Pfister	3	6	6	6
(West Germany) B Becker	6	7	2	6
7	(United States) T Mayotte	4	6	6	4

Third round
(France) G Forget	6	7	6
(Republic of Ireland) M Doyle	3	5	4
(United States) H Pfister	5	2	2
(West Germany) B Becker	7	6	6

Fourth round
(France) G Forget	6	4	3
(West Germany) B Becker	7	6	6

=== Section 5 ===
First round
(United States) A Andrews	7	6	4	6
(United States) K Flach	6	4	6	3
Q	(Austria) P Feigl	6	7	6
(United States) S Denton	3	6	1
WC	(Australia) S Youl	2	6	7	4	6
(West Germany) R Gehring	6	3	6	6	2
Q	(United States) C Wittenberg	3	6	3	6
(United States) J Sadri	6	1	6	7

Second round
5	(Australia) P Cash	7	7	6
(United States) A Andrews	5	6	1
Q	(Austria) P Feigl	2	2^{r}
(Switzerland) J Hlasek	6	5
WC	(Australia) S Youl	4	1	3
(United States) T Gullikson	6	6	6
(United States) J Sadri	6	3	4	7	6
10	(United Kingdom) J Lloyd	4	6	6	6	3

Third round
5	(Australia) P Cash	5	6	6	5	7
(Switzerland) J Hlasek	7	3	3	7	5
(United States) T Gullikson	6	6	6	2	4
(United States) J Sadri	4	3	7	6	6

Fourth round
5	(Australia) P Cash	7	6	7
(United States) J Sadri	6	4	5

=== Section 6 ===
First round
(United States) S McCain	6	4	2
LL	(United States) T Cain	7	6	6
Q	(United States) R Nixon	3	6	6	1
Q	(United States) M Anger	6	3	7	6
Q	(Australia) P Kronk	4	6	1	2
(United States) J Mattke	6	4	6	6
(Australia) B Drewett	6	6	6	6
(Australia) P McNamee	7	3	2	4

Second round
13	(United States) M Bauer	6	4	7	7
LL	(United States) T Cain	2	6	6	5
Q	(United States) M Anger	6	6	2	2
(Australia) J Frawley	7	3	6	6
(New Zealand) B Derlin	7	6	6
(United States) J Mattke	6	2	3
(Australia) B Drewett	4	3	6
4	(United States) J Kriek	6	6	7

Third round
13	(United States) M Bauer	3	4	3
(Australia) J Frawley	6	6	6
(New Zealand) B Derlin	6	6	7	4
4	(United States) J Kriek	7	7	6	6

Fourth round
(Australia) J Frawley	4	3	2
4	(United States) J Kriek	6	6	6

=== Section 7 ===
First round
(United States) G Layendecker	7	4	3	4
(United States) M Davis	6	6	6	6
(United States) T Gullikson	6	3	6	6
WC	(Australia) P McNamara	4	6	4	4
(United States) L Bourne	6	6	4	7
(United States) L Stefanki	4	2	6	6
(West Germany) D Keretić	3	5	4
(United Kingdom) S Shaw	6	7	6

Second round
8	(Sweden) S Edberg	6	6	7	6
(United States) M Davis	2	7	5	2
(South Africa) C van Rensburg	4	6	6	4
(United States) T Gullikson	6	7	3	6
(United States) M De Palmer	5	6	1	3
(United States) L Bourne	7	2	6	6
(United Kingdom) S Shaw	4	5	5
11	(India) R Krishnan	6	7	7

Third round
8	(Sweden) S Edberg	6	6	7
(United States) T Gullikson	1	2	5
(United States) L Bourne
11	(India) R Krishnan	w/o

Fourth round
8	(Sweden) S Edberg	6	6	6
(United States) L Bourne	2	2	2

=== Section 8 ===
First round
(Israel) S Glickstein	2	6	6	5
(Sweden) S Simonsson	6	7	4	7
(Australia) P Doohan	5	4	7	3
(United States) R Seguso	7	6	6	6
WC	(Australia) CA Miller	4	4	4
Q	(Australia) D Houston	6	6	6
(New Zealand) D Mustard	3	6	6	6
(United States) C Hooper	6	3	4	4

Second round
16	(Czechoslovakia) M Mečíř	5	2	5
(Sweden) S Simonsson	7	6	7
Q	(Sweden) R Båthman	5	6	2	2
(United States) R Seguso	7	4	6	6
Q	(Australia) D Houston	6	6	6
(Australia) M Edmondson	3	4	4
(Australia) D Mustard	6	3	5	3
2	(Sweden) M Wilander	1	6	7	6

Third round
(Sweden) S Simonsson	1	6	2	7	6
(United States) R Seguso	6	2	6	5	3
Q	(Australia) D Houston	3	6	6	1
2	(Sweden) M Wilander	6	2	7	6

Fourth round
(Sweden) S Simonsson	6	1	7	2	3
2	(Sweden) M Wilander	2	6	5	6	6

Preceded by 1984 US Open	Grand Slam men's singles	Succeeded by 1985 French Open
