= 1984 Australian Open – Women's doubles =

Women's doubles
- 1984 Australian Open

Final
- Champions: (United States) Martina Navratilova (United States) Pam Shriver
- Runners-up: (West Germany) Claudia Kohde-Kilsch (Czechoslovakia) Helena Suková
- Score: 6–3, 6–4

Details
- Draw: 32
- Seeds: 8

Events
| Singles | men | women | | boys | girls |
| Doubles | men | women | mixed | boys | girls |
| WC Singles | men | women | quad |
| WC Doubles | men | women | quad |
| Legends | men | women | mixed |
- Australian Open

Two-time defending champions Martina Navratilova and Pam Shriver defeated Claudia Kohde-Kilsch and Helena Suková in the final, 6–3, 6–4 to win the women's doubles tennis title at the 1984 Australian Open. With the win, they became the third and fourth women in history (following Maria Bueno and Margaret Court) to complete a Grand Slam in women's doubles.

== Seeds ==
Champion seeds are indicated in bold text while text in italics indicates the round in which those seeds were eliminated.

1. (United States) **Martina Navratilova** / (United States) **Pam Shriver (champions)**
2. (United States) Barbara Potter / (United States) Sharon Walsh (semifinals)
3. (West Germany) Claudia Kohde-Kilsch / (Czechoslovakia) Helena Suková (final)
4. (United States) Chris Evert-Lloyd / (Australia) Wendy Turnbull (semifinals)
5. (United States) Betsy Nagelsen / (United States) Anne White (second round)
6. (South Africa) Beverly Mould / (Australia) Elizabeth Sayers (first round)
7. (United Kingdom) Jo Durie / (France) Catherine Tanvier (second round)
8. (United States) Alycia Moulton / (United States) Paula Smith (first round)

== Draw ==
Key

- Q = Qualifier
- WC = Wild card
- LL = Lucky loser
- Alt = Alternate
- ITF = ITF entry
- PR = Protected ranking
- SR = Special ranking
- SE = Special exempt
- JE = Junior exempt
- JR = Junior Accelerator Programme entrant
- CO = College Accelerator Programme entrant
- NG = Next Gen Accelerator Program entrant
- w/o = Walkover
- r = Retired
- d = Defaulted

=== Final ===
| Final |
| 1 | **(United States) Martina Navratilova** **(United States) Pam Shriver** | **6** | **6** |
| 3 | (West Germany) Claudia Kohde-Kilsch (Czechoslovakia) Helena Suková | 3 | 4 |

=== Top half ===
First round
1 | (United States) **M Navratilova** (United States) **P Shriver** | **7^{7}** | **6**
(South Africa) R Fairbank (United States) C Reynolds | 6^{2} | 4
(Canada) H Pelletier (United States) W White | 4 | **6** | 4
(South Africa) **J Mundel** (South Africa) **Y Vermaak** | **6** | 3 | **6**
(Canada) **C Bassett** (United States) **Z Garrison** | **6** | **6**
(United States) G Fernández (West Germany) S Graf | 1 | 1
(United States) E Burgin (United States) S Collins | 6^{2} | 3
5 | (United States) **B Nagelsen** (United States) **A White** | **7^{7}** | **6**
4 | (United States) **C Evert-Lloyd** (Australia) **W Turnbull** | **6** | **6**
(South Africa) I Kloss (United States) L McNeil | 2 | 3
(Australia) B Remilton (Japan) N Sato | 5 | **6** | 5
(United States) **C Benjamin** (United States) **V Nelson** | **7** | 3 | **7**
(United States) S Mascarin (United States) K Rinaldi | 1 | 4
(Australia) **A Minter** (Australia) **E Minter** | **6** | **6**
(Australia) R Bryant (Australia) J Byrne | 3 | 6^{5}
7 | (United Kingdom) **J Durie** (France) **C Tanvier** | **6** | **7^{7}**

Second round
1 | (United States) **M Navratilova** (United States) **P Shriver** | **6** | **6**
(South Africa) J Mundel (South Africa) Y Vermaak | 2 | 1
(Canada) **C Bassett** (United States) **Z Garrison** | **7^{7}** | **6**
5 | (United States) B Nagelsen (United States) A White | 6^{5} | 3
4 | (United States) **C Evert-Lloyd** (Australia) **W Turnbull** | **6** | **6**
(United States) C Benjamin (United States) V Nelson | 3 | 0
(Australia) **A Minter** (Australia) **E Minter** | **6** | **6**
7 | (United Kingdom) J Durie (France) C Tanvier | 0 | 3

Quarterfinals
1 | (United States) **M Navratilova** (United States) **P Shriver** | **6** | **6**
(Canada) C Bassett (United States) Z Garrison | 2 | 0
4 | (United States) **C Evert-Lloyd** (Australia) **W Turnbull** | **6** | 1 | **6**
(Australia) A Minter (Australia) E Minter | 2 | **6** | 3

Semifinals
1 | (United States) **M Navratilova** (United States) **P Shriver** | **6** | **6**
4 | (United States) C Evert-Lloyd (Australia) W Turnbull | 4 | 3

=== Bottom half ===
First round
8 | (United States) A Moulton (United States) P Smith | 5 | 0
(Soviet Union) **S Cherneva** (Soviet Union) **L Savchenko** | **7** | **6**
(United States) **M-L Piatek** (United States) **K Shaefer** | **6** | **6**
(United States) H Crowe (United States) K Steinmetz | 2 | 2
(France) S Amiach (France) C Vanier | **7** | 5 | 4
(United States) **L Antonoplis** (United Kingdom) **V Wade** | 5 | **7** | **6**
(United Kingdom) S Barker (United Kingdom) A Croft | 3 | 5
3 | (West Germany) **C Kohde-Kilsch** (Czechoslovakia) **H Suková** | **6** | **7**
6 | (South Africa) B Mould (Australia) E Sayers | 5 | 3
(United States) **A Henricksson** (United States) **R White** | **7** | **6**
(Switzerland) **C Jolissaint** (Netherlands) **M Mesker** | **6** | **6**
(Czechoslovakia) I Budařová (United States) S Foltz | 2 | 0
(United States) A Leand (Hungary) A Temesvári | 2 | 1
(France) **P Paradis** (France) **C Suire** | **6** | **6**
(West Germany) B Bunge (West Germany) E Pfaff | 4 | 4
2 | (United States) **B Potter** (United States) **S Walsh** | **6** | **6**

Second round
(Soviet Union) S Cherneva (Soviet Union) L Savchenko | 5 | **6** | 1
(United States) **M-L Piatek** (United States) **K Shaefer** | **7** | 3 | **6**
(United States) L Antonoplis (United Kingdom) V Wade | 1 | **6** | 2
3 | (West Germany) **C Kohde-Kilsch** (Czechoslovakia) **H Suková** | **6** | 3 | **6**
(United States) **A Henricksson** (United States) **R White** | 4 | **6** | **10**
(Switzerland) C Jolissaint (Netherlands) M Mesker | **6** | 2 | 8
(France) P Paradis (France) C Suire | 0 | **6** | 4
2 | (United States) **B Potter** (United States) **S Walsh** | **6** | 3 | **6**

Quarterfinals
(United States) M-L Piatek (United States) K Shaefer | 2 | 0
3 | (West Germany) **C Kohde-Kilsch** (Czechoslovakia) **H Suková** | **6** | **6**
(United States) A Henricksson (United States) R White | 3 | 3
2 | (United States) **B Potter** (United States) **S Walsh** | **6** | **6**

Semifinals
3 | (West Germany) **C Kohde-Kilsch** (Czechoslovakia) **H Suková** | **6** | **6**
2 | (United States) B Potter (United States) S Walsh | 3 | 4
