= Martina Navratilova's 74-match winning streak in 1984 =

The list below details Martina Navratilova's Open Era record 74-match winning streak in 1984 on the Women's Tennis Association (WTA) tour (Women's Singles).

Period: February 20 to December 6, 1984

#	Tournament	Venue	Date	Surface	Round	Opponent	Score
0	Oakland	Oakland, California, United States	Jan 15	Carpet	Final	Lost to (Czechoslovakia) Hana Mandlikova	6–7, 6–3, 4–6
1	U.S. Indoor Championships	East Hanover, New Jersey, United States	Feb 20–26	Carpet	1st Round	(United States) Nancy Yeargin	6–3, 6–2
2	U.S. Indoor Championships	East Hanover, New Jersey, United States	Feb 20–26	Carpet	2nd Round	(United Kingdom) Virginia Wade	6–0, 6–2
3	U.S. Indoor Championships	East Hanover, New Jersey, United States	Feb 20–26	Carpet	Quarterfinal	(United States) Pam Casale	6–3, 6–2
4	U.S. Indoor Championships	East Hanover, New Jersey, United States	Feb 20–26	Carpet	Semifinal	(Netherlands) Marcella Mesker	6–1, 6–3
5	U.S. Indoor Championships	East Hanover, New Jersey, United States	Feb 20–26	Carpet	Final	(United States) Chris Evert-Lloyd	6–2, 7–6
6	Virginia Slims Championships	Madison Square Garden, New York City, United States	Feb 28 – Mar 4	Carpet	1st Round	(Romania) Virginia Ruzici	6–3, 6–1
7	Virginia Slims Championships	Madison Square Garden, New York City, United States	Feb 28 – Mar 4	Carpet	2nd Round	(Canada) Carling Bassett	6–3, 6–0
8	Virginia Slims Championships	Madison Square Garden, New York City, United States	Feb 28 – Mar 4	Carpet	Semifinal	(United States) Pam Shriver	7–6, 6–4
9	Virginia Slims Championships	Madison Square Garden, New York City, United States	Feb 28 – Mar 4	Carpet	Final	(United States) Chris Evert-Lloyd	6–3, 7–5, 6–1
	Lipton WTA Championships	Amelia Island, Florida, United States	April 16–22	Clay	1st Round	BYE	
10	Lipton WTA Championships	Amelia Island, Florida, United States	April 16–22	Clay	2nd Round	(United States) Kimberly Shaefer	6–1, 6–1
11	Lipton WTA Championships	Amelia Island, Florida, United States	April 16–22	Clay	3rd Round	(Socialist Federal Republic of Yugoslavia) Mima Jaušovec	6–1, 7–5
12	Lipton WTA Championships	Amelia Island, Florida, United States	April 16–22	Clay	Quarterfinal	(France) Catherine Tanvier	7–6, 6–4
13	Lipton WTA Championships	Amelia Island, Florida, United States	April 16–22	Clay	Semifinal	(Czechoslovakia) Hana Mandlíková	6–3, 4–6, 6–4
14	Lipton WTA Championships	Amelia Island, Florida, United States	April 16–22	Clay	Final	(United States) Chris Evert-Lloyd	6–2, 6–0
	United Airlines Tournament of Champions	Orlando, Florida, United States	Apr 23–29	Clay	1st Round	BYE	
15	United Airlines Tournament of Champions	Orlando, Florida, United States	Apr 23–29	Clay	2nd Round	(United States) Kimberly Shaefer	6–1, 6–2
16	United Airlines Tournament of Champions	Orlando, Florida, United States	Apr 23–29	Clay	Quarterfinal	(United States) Kathy Horvath	7–6, 6–2
17	United Airlines Tournament of Champions	Orlando, Florida, United States	Apr 23–29	Clay	Semifinal	(United States) Bonnie Gadusek	6–3, 6–1
18	United Airlines Tournament of Champions	Orlando, Florida, United States	Apr 23–29	Clay	Final	(Peru) Laura Arraya	6–0, 6–1
19	French Open	Roland Garros, Paris, France	May 28 – Jun 10	Clay	1st Round	(France) Nathalie Tauziat	6–1, 6–2
20	French Open	Roland Garros, Paris, France	May 28 – Jun 10	Clay	2nd Round	(Netherlands) Marcella Mesker	6–1, 6–1
21	French Open	Roland Garros, Paris, France	May 28 – Jun 10	Clay	3rd Round	(France) Marie-Christine Calleja	6–1, 6–3
22	French Open	Roland Garros, Paris, France	May 28 – Jun 10	Clay	4th Round	(West Germany) Claudia Kohde-Kilsch	6–0, 6–1
23	French Open	Roland Garros, Paris, France	May 28 – Jun 10	Clay	Quarterfinal	(United States) Kathy Horvath	6–4, 6–2
24	French Open	Roland Garros, Paris, France	May 28 – Jun 10	Clay	Semifinal	(Czechoslovakia) Hana Mandlíková	3–6, 6–2, 6–2
25	French Open	Roland Garros, Paris, France	May 28 – Jun 10	Clay	Final	(United States) Chris Evert-Lloyd	6–3, 6–1
26	Eastbourne International	Devonshire Park, Eastbourne, Great Britain	Jun 18–23	Grass	1st Round	(United States) Ann Kiyomura	6–2, 6–4
27	Eastbourne International	Devonshire Park, Eastbourne, Great Britain	Jun 18–23	Grass	2nd Round	(United States) Wendy White	6–2, 6–3
28	Eastbourne International	Devonshire Park, Eastbourne, Great Britain	Jun 18–23	Grass	3rd Round	(Canada) Carling Bassett	6–1, 6–3
29	Eastbourne International	Devonshire Park, Eastbourne, Great Britain	Jun 18–23	Grass	Quarterfinal	(Australia) Wendy Turnbull	6–3, 6–2
30	Eastbourne International	Devonshire Park, Eastbourne, Great Britain	Jun 18–23	Grass	Semifinal	(West Germany) Claudia Kohde-Kilsch	4–6, 6–1, 6–4
31	Eastbourne International	Devonshire Park, Eastbourne, Great Britain	Jun 18–23	Grass	Final	(United States) Kathy Jordan	6–4, 6–1
32	Wimbledon	Wimbledon, London, Great Britain	Jun 25 – Jul 8	Grass	1st Round	(United States) Mareen Louie	6–4, 6–0
33	Wimbledon	Wimbledon, London, Great Britain	Jun 25 – Jul 8	Grass	2nd Round	(United States) Amy Holton	6–2, 7–5
34	Wimbledon	Wimbledon, London, Great Britain	Jun 25 – Jul 8	Grass	3rd Round	(Czechoslovakia) Iva Budařová	6–2, 6–2
35	Wimbledon	Wimbledon, London, Great Britain	Jun 25 – Jul 8	Grass	4th Round	(Australia) Elizabeth Sayers	6–0, ret.
36	Wimbledon	Wimbledon, London, Great Britain	Jun 25 – Jul 8	Grass	Quarterfinal	(Bulgaria) Manuela Maleeva	6–3, 6–2
37	Wimbledon	Wimbledon, London, Great Britain	Jun 25 – Jul 8	Grass	Semifinal	(United States) Kathy Jordan	6–3, 6–4
38	Wimbledon	Wimbledon, London, Great Britain	Jun 25 – Jul 8	Grass	Final	(United States) Chris Evert-Lloyd	7–6, 6–2
39	Virginia Slims of Newport	Newport Casino, Newport, Rhode Island, United States	Jul 30 – Aug 5	Grass	1st Round	(United States) Jennifer Mundel-Reinbold	6–1, 6–2
40	Virginia Slims of Newport	Newport Casino, Newport, Rhode Island, United States	Jul 30 – Aug 5	Grass	2nd Round	(United States) Grace Kim	6–0, 6–0
41	Virginia Slims of Newport	Newport Casino, Newport, Rhode Island, United States	Jul 30 – Aug 5	Grass	Quarterfinal	(United States) Wendy White	6–0, 6–3
42	Virginia Slims of Newport	Newport Casino, Newport, Rhode Island, United States	Jul 30 – Aug 5	Grass	Semifinal	(Australia) Anne Minter	6–1, 6–1
43	Virginia Slims of Newport	Newport Casino, Newport, Rhode Island, United States	Jul 30 – Aug 5	Grass	Final	(United States) Gigi Fernández	6–3, 7–6
	United Jersey Bank Classic	Mahwah, New Jersey, United States	Aug 13–19	Hard	1st Round	BYE	
44	United Jersey Bank Classic	Mahwah, New Jersey, United States	Aug 13–19	Hard	2nd Round	(France) Pascale Paradis	6–2, 6–2
45	United Jersey Bank Classic	Mahwah, New Jersey, United States	Aug 13–19	Hard	3rd Round	(United States) Kim Sands	6–2, 6–1
46	United Jersey Bank Classic	Mahwah, New Jersey, United States	Aug 13–19	Hard	Quarterfinal	(United States) Barbara Potter	6–3, 6–1
47	United Jersey Bank Classic	Mahwah, New Jersey, United States	Aug 13–19	Hard	Semifinal	(United States) Pam Casale	6–2, 6–3
48	United Jersey Bank Classic	Mahwah, New Jersey, United States	Aug 13–19	Hard	Final	(United States) Pam Shriver	6–4, 4–6, 7–5
49	US Open	Flushing Meadows, New York, United States	Aug 28 – Sep 9	Hard	1st Round	(United States) Lea Antonoplis	6–4, 6–2
50	US Open	Flushing Meadows, New York, United States	Aug 28 – Sep 9	Hard	2nd Round	(United States) Andrea Leand	6–4, 6–2
51	US Open	Flushing Meadows, New York, United States	Aug 28 – Sep 9	Hard	3rd Round	(United States) Jennifer Mundel-Reinbold	6–0, 6–0
52	US Open	Flushing Meadows, New York, United States	Aug 28 – Sep 9	Hard	4th Round	(United States) Barbara Potter	6–4, 6–4
53	US Open	Flushing Meadows, New York, United States	Aug 28 – Sep 9	Hard	Quarterfinal	(Czechoslovakia) Helena Suková	6–3, 6–3
54	US Open	Flushing Meadows, New York, United States	Aug 28 – Sep 9	Hard	Semifinal	(Australia) Wendy Turnbull	6–4, 6–1
55	US Open	Flushing Meadows, New York, United States	Aug 28 – Sep 9	Hard	Final	(United States) Chris Evert-Lloyd	4–6, 6–4, 6–4
56	Maybelline Classic	Fort Lauderdale, Florida, United States	Sep 17–24	Hard	1st Round	(United States) Melissa Brown	6–1, 6–2
57	Maybelline Classic	Fort Lauderdale, Florida, United States	Sep 17–24	Hard	2nd Round	(South Africa) Rosalyn Fairbank	6–1, 6–2
58	Maybelline Classic	Fort Lauderdale, Florida, United States	Sep 17–24	Hard	Quarterfinal	(United States) Elise Burgin	6–3, 6–2
59	Maybelline Classic	Fort Lauderdale, Florida, United States	Sep 17–24	Hard	Semifinal	(Australia) Wendy Turnbull	6–3, 6–2
60	Maybelline Classic	Fort Lauderdale, Florida, United States	Sep 17–24	Hard	Final	(United States) Michelle Torres	6–1, 6–0
61	Virginia Slims of New Orleans	New Orleans, Louisiana, United States	Sep 24–30	Carpet	1st Round	(United States) Lisa Spain	6–3, 6–0
62	Virginia Slims of New Orleans	New Orleans, Louisiana, United States	Sep 24–30	Carpet	2nd Round	(United States) Mary-Lou Piatek	6–2, 6–0
63	Virginia Slims of New Orleans	New Orleans, Louisiana, United States	Sep 24–30	Carpet	Quarterfinal	(United States) Jenny Klitch	6–1, 6–0
64	Virginia Slims of New Orleans	New Orleans, Louisiana, United States	Sep 24–30	Carpet	Semifinal	(United States) Alycia Moulton	6–2, 7–6
65	Virginia Slims of New Orleans	New Orleans, Louisiana, United States	Sep 24–30	Carpet	Final	(United States) Zina Garrison	6–4, 6–3
	NSW Building Society Open	White City, Sydney, NSW, Australia	Nov 19–25	Grass	1st Round	BYE	
66	NSW Building Society Open	White City, Sydney, NSW, Australia	Nov 19–25	Grass	2nd Round	(United States) Mary-Lou Piatek	6–4, 6–2
67	NSW Building Society Open	White City, Sydney, NSW, Australia	Nov 19–25	Grass	3rd Round	(United States) Sharon Walsh	6–4, 7–5
68	NSW Building Society Open	White City, Sydney, NSW, Australia	Nov 19–25	Grass	Quarterfinal	(South Africa) Yvonne Vermaak	6–3, 6–2
69	NSW Building Society Open	White City, Sydney, NSW, Australia	Nov 19–25	Grass	Semifinal	(United States) Zina Garrison	6–2, 6–1
70	NSW Building Society Open	White City, Sydney, NSW, Australia	Nov 19–25	Grass	Final	(United States) Ann Henricksson	6–1, 6–1
71	Australian Open	Kooyong, Melbourne, VIC, Australia	Nov 26 – Dec 9	Grass	1st Round	(South Africa) Yvonne Vermaak	6–1, 6–1
72	Australian Open	Kooyong, Melbourne, VIC, Australia	Nov 26 – Dec 9	Grass	2nd Round	(United States) Mary-Lou Piatek	6–2, 6–1
73	Australian Open	Kooyong, Melbourne, VIC, Australia	Nov 26 – Dec 9	Grass	3rd Round	(United States) Kathy Rinaldi	4–6, 6–0, 6–1
74	Australian Open	Kooyong, Melbourne, VIC, Australia	Nov 26 – Dec 9	Grass	Quarterfinal	(United States) Barbara Potter	6–3, 6–2
End	Australian Open	Kooyong, Melbourne, VIC, Australia	Nov 26 – Dec 9	Grass	Semifinal	Lost to (Czechoslovakia) Helena Suková	6–1, 3–6, 5–7

- BYE - Automatic advancement of a player to the next round of a tournament without facing an opponent.
