= Roger Knapp =

American tennis player

- Full name: Roger Bill Knapp
- Country (sports): United States
- Born: September 7, 1959 Des Moines, Iowa
- Died: March 30, 2008 (aged 48) Sarasota, Florida
- Plays: Left-handed

Singles
- Career record: 4-6
- Highest ranking: No. 146 (June 24, 1985)

Doubles
- Career record: 2-4
- Highest ranking: No. 119 (October 21, 1985)

Grand Slam doubles results
- US Open: 2R (1985)

Roger Bill Knapp (September 7, 1959 – March 30, 2008) was a professional tennis player from the United States.

== Biography ==
=== Early life ===
The son of Iowa real estate developer Bill Knapp and Irene Madge "Magoo" née Hill Knapp, (Note: Irene Madge "Magoo" née Hill Knapp was born on January 21, 1927, at her grandmother's farm southwest of Woodland, Decatur County, Iowa; and passed away on April 9, 2024, at her home in Urbandale, Iowa. In May 1945, she graduated from High School in Allerton, Iowa, where he met her future husband William "Bill" Knapp whom she married in November 1946 after he returned from his enlistment during World War II. They established the I & B Café in Allerton, Iowa, but later closed it and moved to Des Moines to pursue a career in real estate where Irene managed the books for their company which became Iowa Realty in 1952.) he was born in Des Moines in 1959 and attended the local Herbert Hoover High School. His sister Ginny née Knapp Haviland was born in 1950.

After his sophomore year he transferred to La Jolla High School in California and then took up a tennis scholarship to attend the University of South California (USC). An All-American in doubles in 1979 and 1980, Knapp graduated in 1982, then turned professional and joined the international tennis circuit.

=== Professional tennis ===
His professional appearances were delayed when he left the tour to study at a Baptist bible college, but he returned to feature in several Grand Prix events in 1984 and 1985.

Knapp, a left-handed player, made the semi-finals of the Bristol Grand Prix tournament in 1985, during which he upset then world number 27 Henri Leconte. He peaked at 146 in the world for singles and was ranked as high as 119 in doubles. His final appearance on tour was in the men's doubles draw at the 1985 US Open where he partnered with Australia's Peter Doohan to reach the second round.

=== Coaching ===
From 1986 to 1989, he served as an assistant coach for the USC Trojans tennis team, in a tenure which included a Pac-10 title. He was then head coach at Drake University until 1993. Under Knapp, Drake won successive Missouri Valley Conference titles and in 1992 featured in the NCAA team championships for the first time.

The Knapp Center, a multi-purpose arena on the Drake University campus, is named after his father, while the former Drake Tennis Center is now known as the Roger Knapp Tennis Center.

=== Personal life ===
Knapp settled in Sarasota, Florida and had two daughters.

In 2007, he went through open-heart surgery to fix an aortic aneurysm, but the following year suffered a blood clot. After undergoing further surgery he died of a heart attack, aged 48.
