= Jeff Arons =

American tennis player

- Full name: Jeff Arons
- Country (sports): United States
- Born: April 7, 1960 (age 66) Portola Valley, California, U.S.

Singles
- Highest ranking: No. 277 (June 17, 1985)

Doubles
- Career record: 2-4
- Highest ranking: No. 173 (October 21, 1985)

Grand Slam doubles results
- Australian Open: 1R (1985)

Grand Slam mixed doubles results
- French Open: 1R (1986)
Medal record
Representing United States
Summer Universiade
Gold medal – first place	1983 Edmonton	Men's doubles

Jeff Arons (born April 7, 1960) is a former professional tennis player from the United States.

== Biography ==
Arons, a California native, was an All-American tennis player at Stanford University. He won a gold medal partnering John Sevely in the doubles at the 1983 Summer Universiade in Edmonton, Canada.

From 1985 to 1986, Arons competed on the professional tennis tour. His best performance in a Grand Prix tournament was a quarter-final appearance in the doubles at the 1986 Toronto Indoor.

Arons made two Grand Slam main draw appearances, in the men's doubles at the 1985 Australian Open and mixed doubles at the 1986 Wimbledon Championships.

In 1988 he co-founded Stanford based non profit summer tennis program East Palo Alto Tennis and Tutoring.

== Challenger titles ==
=== Doubles: (1) ===
No.	Year	Tournament	Surface	Partner	Opponents	Score
1.	1985	Kaduna, Nigeria	Clay	(United States) Richard Akel	(Zimbabwe) Haroon Ismail (Greece) Fotis Vazeos	6–3, 6–3
