= Tom Cain (tennis) =

American tennis player

- Full name: Thomas Spessard Cain
- Country (sports): United States
- Born: October 11, 1958 (age 67) Richmond, Virginia
- Turned pro: 1980
- Retired: 1986
- Plays: Right-handed
- Prize money: $139,482

Singles
- Career record: 43–66
- Career titles: 0
- Highest ranking: No. 106 (3 January 1983)

Grand Slam singles results
- Australian Open: 2R (1982, 1984)
- French Open: 1R (1983)
- Wimbledon: 1R (1983, 1984)
- US Open: 2R (1983)

Doubles
- Career record: 13–34
- Career titles: 1

Grand Slam doubles results
- Australian Open: 1R (1980)
- Wimbledon: 1R (1980, 1984)
- US Open: 1R (1980, 1983)

Thomas Spessard Cain (born October 11, 1958) is a former professional tennis player from the United States.

== Biography ==
Born in Richmond, Virginia on October 11, 1958, he is the son of Ronald and Susan Cain.

Cain was a member of the US Junior Davis Cup team in 1976. He played varsity tennis while at Southern Methodist University and was an All-American in the 1980 season.

From 1980 he competed professionally and in his first year on tour was a semi-finalist at the Columbus Open, a tournament on the Grand Prix circuit. He had wins over both Johan Kriek and Guy Forget when he made the quarter-finals at Hong Kong in 1982. Another upset win came against then world number 23 Mark Edmondson at the 1983 Stella Artois Championships in Queen's, London. He won a Grand Prix doubles title at the 1983 South Orange Open, with Fritz Buehning.

In Grand Slam competition he appeared in the main draw of all four major tournaments. He took Guillermo Vilas to five sets when he faced the Argentine in the second round of the 1983 US Open. With the score at 1–1 in the fifth set, Cain was injured when he twisted his ankle and slid head first into the scoreboard. Although he was able to continue the match he won only one more game. In both of his appearances at Wimbledon he had to retire hurt during his first round matches, against Tim Gullikson in 1983 and Miloslav Mečíř in 1984.

Retiring from tennis in 1986, Cain then worked with Wheat First Securities for many years. He is now Senior Vice-President with UBS Financial Services and is married with two daughters and a son.

== Grand Prix career finals ==
=== Doubles: 1 (1–0) ===
Result	W–L	Date	Tournament	Surface	Partner	Opponents	Score
Win	1–0	Jul 1983	South Orange, U.S.	Clay	(United States) Fritz Buehning	(United Kingdom) John Lloyd (United States) Dick Stockton	6–2, 7–5

== Challenger titles ==
=== Singles: (1) ===
No.	Year	Tournament	Surface	Opponent	Score
1.	1982	Chigasaki, Japan	Clay	(Sweden) Henrik Sundström	6–4, 6–3
