= Mats Wilander =

Swedish tennis player (born 1964)

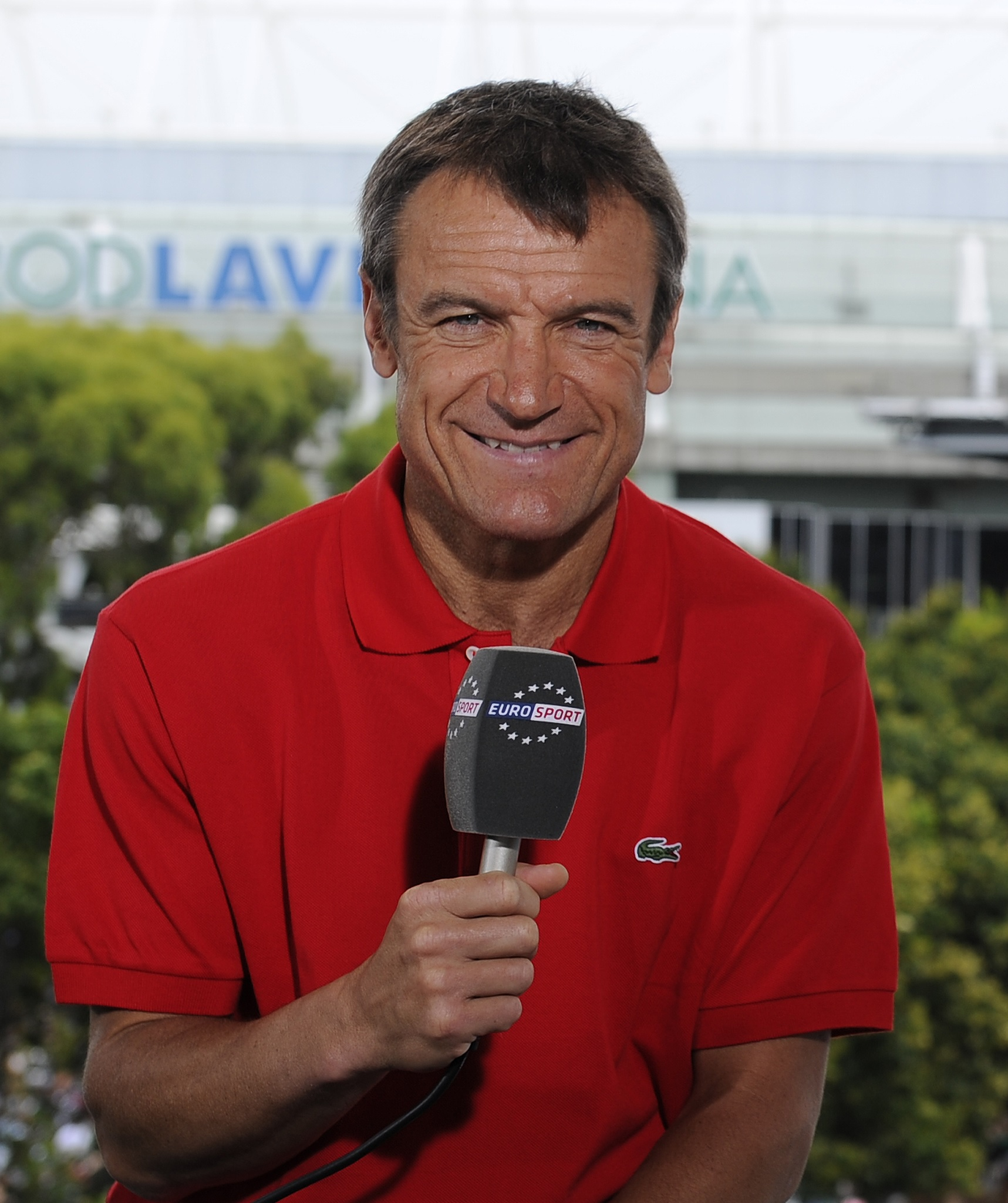
- Wilander in the Eurosport studio during the 2014 Australian Open
- Country (sports): Sweden
- Residence: Hailey, Idaho, U.S.
- Born: 22 August 1964 (age 62) Alvesta, Sweden
- Height: 1.83 m (6 ft 0 in)
- Turned pro: 1979
- Retired: 1996
- Plays: Right-handed (two-handed backhand)
- Coach: John-Anders Sjögren
- Prize money: US$7,976,256
- Int. Tennis HoF: 2002 (member page)

Singles
- Career record: 571–222 (72.0%)
- Career titles: 33
- Highest ranking: No. 1 (12 September 1988)

Grand Slam singles results
- Australian Open: W (1983, 1984, 1988)
- French Open: W (1982, 1985, 1988)
- Wimbledon: QF (1987, 1988, 1989)
- US Open: W (1988)

Other tournaments
- Tour Finals: F (1987)
- WCT Finals: SF (1986)

Doubles
- Career record: 168–127 (56.9%)
- Career titles: 7
- Highest ranking: No. 3 (21 October 1985)

Grand Slam doubles results
- Australian Open: F (1984)
- French Open: SF (1985)
- Wimbledon: W (1986)
- US Open: F (1986)

Other doubles tournaments
- Tour Finals: F (1985)

Team competitions
- Davis Cup: W (1984, 1985, 1987)

Mats Arne Olof Wilander (Swedish: [ˈmats vɪˈlǎnːdɛr]; born 22 August 1964) is a Swedish former professional tennis player. He was ranked as the world No. 1 in men's singles by the Association of Tennis Professionals (ATP) for 20 weeks, including as the year-end No. 1 in 1988. Wilander won 33 career singles titles, including seven majors (three each at the French Open and Australian Open, and one at the US Open), and seven career doubles titles, including a major in men's doubles at Wimbledon.

Wilander's breakthrough came suddenly and unexpectedly when he won the 1982 French Open at the age of 17. Wilander won his fourth major singles title at the age of 20, the youngest man in history to have achieved the feat. In 1988, he won three of the four singles majors to finish the year ranked as the world No. 1. Wilander also won eight Grand Prix Super Series titles (1983–88), the precursors to the current ATP Masters 1000 tournaments. He was also a driving force behind Sweden's run of seven consecutive Davis Cup finals from 1983 to 1989, and three titles in 1984, 1985, and 1987. Wilander is one of seven men to have won major singles titles on grass courts, hard courts, and clay courts since the feat became achievable in 1978 (when the US Open was first played on hard courts). Wilander, Nadal, Djokovic and Alcaraz are the only men to have won at least two major singles titles on each of the three surfaces. Wilander retired from the sport in 1996.

In 1983, Wilander won the Jerring Award. In 2002, he was inducted into the International Tennis Hall of Fame.

== Career ==
=== Juniors ===
Born in Växjö, Sweden, Wilander first came to the tennis world's attention when he won the French Open junior title, the European under-16 and under-18 championships, and the Orange Bowl under-16 event in Miami.

=== 1980–1981: Early years ===
Wilander made his debut on the professional tour at the clay court tournament in Båstad, Sweden in 1980. In June 1981 he made his Grand Slam singles debut at Wimbledon, losing in the third round to John Fitzgerald. The Canberra Times said "16-year-old Mats Wilander, who many say will become the new Borg." In September 1981, he lost his only career match against Björn Borg, losing in the first round of the Geneva Open in straight sets. Wilander reached his first ATP final in November 1981 in Bangkok, losing in straight sets to Bill Scanlon.

=== 1982–1983: Teenage Grand Slam champion ===
Wilander surprised the tennis world at the 1982 French Open. As an unseeded player, he upset second seed Ivan Lendl in the fourth round, fifth seed Vitas Gerulaitis in the quarterfinals, fourth seed José Luis Clerc in the semifinals, and third seed Guillermo Vilas in a four-set final that lasted 4 hours and 47 minutes (the longest French singles final played up until that point) and was notable for its long rallies, the longest point taking 90 strokes. At the end of the semifinal against Clerc he requested replay of the match ball as he did not want to win the game due to a questionable referee decision. This was seen as an extraordinary display of fair play and garnered him the Pierre de Coubertin World Fair Play Trophy. He was the youngest ever male Grand Slam singles champion at 17 years, 9 months, a record since broken by Boris Becker and Michael Chang. In only his third entry in a Grand Slam tournament, Wilander also became the player who needed the fewest attempts to win one, a record since equaled by Gustavo Kuerten at the 1997 French Open. Wilander then lost in the fourth round at both Wimbledon, to Brian Teacher, and the US Open to Lendl. Wilander won three additional tournaments in 1982 and finished the year ranked no. 7. During that year, Wilander was awarded the Svenska Dagbladet Gold Medal.

Wilander returned to the French Open in 1983, where he lost to Yannick Noah in the final, after defeating John McEnroe in a quarterfinal. He lost in the third round at Wimbledon to Roscoe Tanner and in the quarterfinals of the US Open to Lendl. Wilander won his second Grand Slam title later that year at the Australian Open, played on grass at Kooyong Stadium, where he defeated McEnroe in a semifinal and Lendl in straight sets in the final, which was a 'baseline battle". He won eight other tournaments in 1983, including two Grand Prix Championship Series titles, and finished the year ranked no. 4.

=== 1984–1985: Continuing success ===
Wilander retained his Australian Open title in 1984, beating Stefan Edberg in the quarterfinals and Kevin Curren in the final. "I don't think I've ever played anyone on grass who consistently makes as many returns as he does from below the net. I felt the whole time I was volleying off my shoes or hitting a half volley and unless you hit a great half volley he goes for the passing shots" said Curren afterwards. He lost in the semifinals of the French Open to Lendl, the second round at Wimbledon to Pat Cash, and the quarterfinals of the US Open to Cash. He won three tournaments in 1984 including his third Championships Series title and again finished the year ranked no. 4.

In 1985, Wilander won the French Open for the second time, defeating Lendl in the final. "Wilander, advancing often to the net to hit home volleys, added lobs and passes to his repertoire ... Lendl's serve let him down". He again reached the Australian Open final, where he lost to Edberg. However, he lost in the first round at Wimbledon to Slobodan Živojinović and the semifinals of the US Open to McEnroe. He won three tournaments in 1985 and finished the year ranked no. 3.

=== 1986–1987: Regular top 3 player but Grand Slam singles drought ===
Wilander rose to the no. 2 ranking, behind Lendl, on 28 April 1986. He then lost in the third round of the French Open to Andrei Chesnokov, the fourth round of Wimbledon to Cash, and the fourth round of the US Open to Miloslav Mečíř. His consistency at other tournaments, however, allowed him to again finish the year ranked no. 3. Wilander partnered with countryman Joakim Nyström to win the men's doubles title at Wimbledon in 1986. He also won his fourth Grand Prix Championship Series title.

The 1987 season saw Wilander unveil a more potent service and a new highly effective one-handed slice backhand, the latter a somewhat remarkable development for a mid-career top-level tennis professional. Despite the improvements, however, Wilander was defeated by Lendl in the finals of both the French Open and the US Open (in a match lasting 4 hours and 47 minutes, the longest singles final in the tournaments history, surpassed the following year). Cash again proved to be Wilander's nemesis at Wimbledon, winning their quarterfinal match in straight sets. Wilander won five tournaments in 1987 including two Grand Prix Tennis Championship Series titles and six overall, finishing the year ranked third in the world for the third consecutive year.

=== 1988: Best year ===
1988 was the pinnacle of Wilander's career. In January, he won his third Australian Open singles title, this time on Melbourne Park's hardcourts, defeating Edberg in a five-set semifinal and home town favourite Cash in a five-set final which Wilander won with "steady baseline play, a few successful forays to the net and a cool head in times of pressure". In doing so, he became the only player to win the Australian Open on both grass and hardcourt. Wilander faced another home crowd favourite, Henri Leconte, in the final of the French Open. Wilander won in straight sets, missing only two out of 73 first serves in the entire match. At Wimbledon, Wilander reached the quarterfinals where he lost to Mečíř. At the US Open, he reached his third Grand Slam final of the year. In a repeat match-up of the previous year's final, he defeated Lendl in five sets in 4 hours 54 minutes (the longest US Open singles final to that point) and ended Lendl's three-year reign at the top of the world rankings. This was Wilander's seventh Grand Slam singles title and resulted in his receiving the number one ranking, having won three of the year's Grand Slam tournaments, two more Grand Prix Championship Series titles at Key Biscayne and Cincinnati, and one other title in Palermo. He held the top ranking for a total of 20 weeks until Lendl reclaimed it at the end of January 1989.

Wilander's 1988 title at Cincinnati was his fourth there, at the time making him one of only three players since 1899 to win four titles in Cincinnati, along with Bobby Riggs and George Lott. Roger Federer has since joined the list.

=== 1989–1991: Decline ===
Wilander's motivation, results, and ranking suffered in 1989. He lost in the second round of the Australian Open to Ramesh Krishnan, the quarterfinals of the French Open to Andrei Chesnokov, the quarterfinals of Wimbledon to John McEnroe, and the second round of the US Open to Pete Sampras. He did not win a tournament during 1989 and he finished the year ranked World No. 12.

Wilander briefly moved back into the top 10 rankings on 12 February 1990, but by the end of the year, his ranking had slumped to World No. 41. He defeated Boris Becker in the quarterfinals of the Australian Open, only to lose to Stefan Edberg in straight sets in the semifinals. He skipped the French Open and Wimbledon and lost in the first round of the US Open to Brad Gilbert. He won the final singles title of his career at Itaparica.

Wilander played only the first half of 1991. He lost in the fourth round of the Australian Open and the second round of the French Open. He finished the year ranked world No. 159.

=== 1993–1996: Final years ===
Wilander was absent from the tour in 1992. He played seven tournaments in 1993, losing in the first round of five of them. At the US Open, he lost in the third round to Cédric Pioline. He finished the year ranked World No. 330.

Except for Wimbledon, Wilander played a full schedule in 1994. He lost in the fourth round of the Australian Open to MaliVai Washington, the first round of the French Open to Andre Agassi in straight sets, and the first round of the US Open to Guy Forget. His only victory over a top ten player was in the second round of the tournament in Indianapolis against Todd Martin. He finished the year ranked World No. 129.

Wilander's results improved slightly in 1995 as he finished the year ranked World No. 46. After losing in the first round of the Australian Open to Jacco Eltingh, he lost in the second round of the French Open to eighth ranked Wayne Ferreira. He then lost in the third round of Wimbledon to Eltingh and the second round of the US Open to Martin. At Canadian Open in Montreal, Wilander won his final tour match against Edberg, then beat eighth ranked Ferreira and sixth ranked Yevgeny Kafelnikov before losing to Agassi in the semis. At New Haven, Wilander beat 10th ranked Marc Rosset before losing to Agassi in the semis.

In 1996, Wilander reached the final of the Pinehurst ATP tournament in May, losing to Fernando Meligeni (it was Wilander's first ATP tournament final since 1990). He played only one Grand Slam tournament, losing in the second round of the French Open to Martin. He retired from the tour after losing his final match to Martin Damm in Beijing in October.

During most of his career, Wilander used the Rossignol F-200 Carbon tennis racquet, an early fiberglass model.

==== Failed drug test and suspension ====
During the 1995 French Open he and Karel Nováček tested positive for cocaine. They appealed the initial three-month suspension by the International Tennis Federation, claiming flawed test procedures but withdrew their appeals in May 1997 and on 15 May 1997 received a three-month suspension from the ATP Tour for failing a drugs test. Additionally Wilander had to return his prize money since May 1995, amounting to $289,005, and forfeit ranking points.

=== Davis Cup ===
Wilander was an integral member of Sweden's highly successful Davis Cup team throughout the 1980s. He reached his first final with Sweden in 1983, which they lost 3–2 to Australia (despite Wilander winning both his singles rubbers in the final). In 1984, Sweden (with Wilander) won the cup, beating the United States 4–1 in the final. Sweden retained the cup in 1985, with a 3–2 final victory over West Germany. Wilander helped Sweden reach the final again in 1986 but declined to play in the final because he was getting married (Sweden lost 3–2 to Australia). Wilander played in his fourth final in 1987, where Sweden beat India 5–0. Two more finals followed in 1988 and 1989, but Sweden lost both to West Germany. Wilander last played in Davis Cup in the 1995 semifinals, where he lost to Andre Agassi and Pete Sampras.

Wilander compiled a 36–16 record in singles and a 7–2 record in doubles in the Davis Cup for Sweden. However, Wilander's most memorable Davis Cup match came in defeat. In a July 1982 quarterfinal tie against the United States on carpet in St. Louis, Missouri, Wilander was defeated in the deciding fifth rubber by John McEnroe 9–7, 6–2, 15–17, 3–6, 8–6. At 6 hours and 32 minutes it remains the second longest singles match in Davis Cup history.

== Career statistics ==
=== Grand Slam performance timeline ===
Key
| **W** | F | SF | QF | #R | RR | Q# | DNQ | A | NH |

(W) winner; (F) finalist; (SF) semifinalist; (QF) quarterfinalist; (#R) rounds 4, 3, 2, 1; (RR) round-robin stage; (Q#) qualification round; (DNQ) did not qualify; (A) absent; (NH) not held; (SR) strike rate (events won / competed); (W–L) win–loss record.

| Tournament | 1980 | 1981 | 1982 | 1983 | 1984 | 1985 | 1986 | 1987 | 1988 | 1989 | 1990 | 1991 | 1992 | 1993 | 1994 | 1995 | 1996 | SR | W–L | Win % |
|---|---|---|---|---|---|---|---|---|---|---|---|---|---|---|---|---|---|---|---|---|
| Australian Open | A | 1R | A | **W** | **W** | F | NH | A | **W** | 2R | SF | 4R | A | A | 4R | 1R | A | 3 / 10 | 36–7 | 84% |
| French Open | A | A | **W** | F | SF | **W** | 3R | F | **W** | QF | A | 2R | A | A | 1R | 2R | 2R | 3 / 12 | 47–9 | 84% |
| Wimbledon | Q1 | 3R | 4R | 3R | 2R | 1R | 4R | QF | QF | QF | A | A | A | A | A | 3R | A | 0 / 10 | 25–10 | 71% |
| US Open | A | A | 4R | QF | QF | SF | 4R | F | **W** | 2R | 1R | A | A | 3R | 1R | 2R | A | 1 / 12 | 36–11 | 77% |
| **Win–loss** | **0–0** | **2–2** | **13–2** | **18–3** | **16–3** | **17–3** | **8–3** | **16–3** | **25–1** | **10–4** | **5–2** | **4–2** | **0–0** | **2–1** | **3–3** | **4–4** | **1–1** | **7 / 44** | **144–37** | **80%** |

=== Singles: 11 (7 titles, 4 runner-ups) ===
| Result | Year | Championship | Surface | Opponents | Score |
|---|---|---|---|---|---|
| Win | 1982 | French Open | Clay | (Argentina) Guillermo Vilas | 1–6, 7–6^{(8–6)}, 6–0, 6–4 |
| Loss | 1983 | French Open | Clay | (France) Yannick Noah | 2–6, 5–7, 6–7^{(3–7)} |
| Win | 1983 | Australian Open | Grass | (Czechoslovakia) Ivan Lendl | 6–1, 6–4, 6–4 |
| Win | 1984 | Australian Open (2) | Grass | (South Africa) Kevin Curren | 6–7^{(5–7)}, 6–4, 7–6^{(7–3)}, 6–2 |
| Win | 1985 | French Open (2) | Clay | (Czechoslovakia) Ivan Lendl | 3–6, 6–4, 6–2, 6–2 |
| Loss | 1985 | Australian Open | Grass | (Sweden) Stefan Edberg | 4–6, 3–6, 3–6 |
| Loss | 1987 | French Open | Clay | (Czechoslovakia) Ivan Lendl | 5–7, 2–6, 6–3, 6–7^{(3–7)} |
| Loss | 1987 | US Open | Hard | (Czechoslovakia) Ivan Lendl | 7–6^{(9–7)}, 0–6, 6–7^{(4–7)}, 4–6 |
| Win | 1988 | Australian Open (3) | Hard | (Australia) Pat Cash | 6–3, 6–7^{(3–7)}, 3–6, 6–1, 8–6 |
| Win | 1988 | French Open (3) | Clay | (France) Henri Leconte | 7–5, 6–2, 6–1 |
| Win | 1988 | US Open | Hard | (Czechoslovakia) Ivan Lendl | 6–4, 4–6, 6–3, 5–7, 6–4 |

=== Records ===
- These records were attained in Open Era of tennis.
- Records in **bold** indicate peer-less achievements.

| Championship | Years | Record accomplished | Player tied | Ref |
| Australian Open | 1983–1985 | 3 consecutive finals | Ivan Lendl; Novak Djokovic | |
| Australian Open | 1983 | Youngest Australian Open champion (19 years, 111 days) | **Stands alone** | |
| French Open | 1982 | Won title on the first attempt | Rafael Nadal | |
| French Open | 1982 | Unseeded winner of singles event | Gustavo Kuerten; Gastón Gaudio | |
| Grand Slam tournaments | 1982–1988 | 7 titles before becoming World No. 1 | **Stands alone** | |

== Life after retirement from the pro-tour ==
Wilander competes from time to time on the senior tour. Since retiring as a player, he has served as captain of the Swedish Davis Cup team. Wilander also serves as a commentator for tennis matches on Eurosport.

Wilander created a minor controversy during the 2006 French Open when he criticized several top players, including Roger Federer and Kim Clijsters, as lacking the competitive edge to beat their toughest rivals. After Federer's 1–6, 6–1, 6–4, 7–6 loss to Nadal in the final, Wilander said that "Federer, today, unfortunately came out with no balls... you don't find too many champions in any sport in the world without heart or balls. He might have them, but against Nadal they shrank to a very small size and it's not once, it's every time."

Wilander began coaching Tatiana Golovin in July 2007. After working with Golovin in the later part of 2007, Wilander began coaching Paul-Henri Mathieu.

== Personal life ==
Wilander, who won $8 million as a pro and more in endorsements, now spends much of his time living on an 81-acre estate in Hailey, Idaho, United States (part of the Sun Valley ski resort) with his wife Sonya (née Mulholland), a South African-born model, whom he started dating in 1985 and married in 1987.

Wilander has four children, Emma, Karl, Erik, and Oskar. His son Erik suffers from a comparatively mild form of epidermolysis bullosa, which benefits from Idaho's cool and dry air, and Wilander and his wife have worked to raise funds for research into cures for the disease.

His brother, Anders Wilander, was a professional ice hockey player and Mayor of Tranås Municipality 2006–2020.

In 2012, Wilander won the International Club's Jean Borotra Sportsmanship Award.

== See also ==
- Lendl–Wilander rivalry
- List of Grand Slam men's singles champions
- World number 1 ranked male tennis players

Sporting positions
| Preceded by Ivan Lendl | World No. 1; 12 September 1988 – 29 January 1989 | Succeeded by Ivan Lendl |
Awards
| Preceded by Annichen Kringstad | Svenska Dagbladet Gold Medal; 1982 | Succeeded by Håkan Carlqvist |
| Preceded by Ivan Lendl | ITF World Champion; 1988 | Succeeded by Boris Becker |
