= Richard Akel =

Former professional tennis player

- Country (sports): United States
- Born: February 12, 1962 (age 64)
- Plays: Left-handed

Singles
- Career record: 0–1
- Highest ranking: No. 345 (June 17, 1985)

Grand Slam singles results
- Australian Open: Q2 (1984)
- Wimbledon: Q1 (1985)

Doubles
- Career record: 0–1
- Highest ranking: No. 182 (July 15, 1985)

Grand Slam doubles results
- Wimbledon: Q1 (1985)

Richard Akel (born February 12, 1962) is an American former professional tennis player.

Akel grew up in Little Rock, Arkansas and comes from a family which has origins in Palestine.

A left-handed player, Akel won two state championships during his high school career and played collegiate tennis at Clemson University, where he was a member of three Atlantic Coast Conference championship teams.

On the professional tour he had a best singles world ranking of 345 and appeared in qualifying draws for grand slam tournaments. He reached a career high doubles ranking 182 in the world and won one title at ATP Challenger level.

In 2019 he was an inductee into the Arkansas Sports Hall of Fame.

== ATP Challenger titles ==
=== Doubles: (1) ===
No.	Date	Tournament	Surface	Partner	Opponents	Score
1.	Feb 1985	Kaduna Challenger; Kaduna, Nigeria	Clay	(United States) Jeff Arons	(Zimbabwe) Haroon Ismail (Greece) Fotis Vazeos	6–3, 6–3
