= Randy Nixon =

American tennis player

- Full name: Randy Nixon
- Country (sports): United States
- Born: November 5, 1960 (age 64); Coronado, California, U.S.
- Plays: Right-handed
- Prize money: $37,961

Singles
- Career record: 1–11
- Highest ranking: No. 175 (July 16, 1984)

Grand Slam singles results
- Australian Open: 1R (1984)

Doubles
- Career record: 6–24
- Highest ranking: No. 161 (August 25, 1986)

Grand Slam doubles results
- Australian Open: 1R (1984)
- US Open: 1R (1986)

Randy Nixon (born November 5, 1960) is a former professional tennis player from the United States.

== Biography ==
Nixon, a right-handed player, comes from the city of Coronado, near San Diego. An All-American player at UC Berkeley, he won the Pac-10 Championship in his senior year (1983). He graduated with a political science degree.

Turning professional in 1983, Nixon spent three years on the professional circuit.

In late 1984 he toured Australia and in his first outing in Brisbane and partnering Glenn Layendecker came close to upsetting the top seeded doubles team of Mark Edmondson and Peter Fleming, managing to take the match to a deciding tiebreak. Soon after he and Laydendecker made the doubles semi-finals at the Melbourne Indoor Grand Prix tournament and then competed together in the main draw of the Australian Open men's doubles. He also featured in the men's singles draw and was beaten in the first round by fellow qualifier Matt Anger in four sets. Following the Australian Open he competed at the Melbourne Outdoor and upset world number 32 John Lloyd, before exiting in the second round.

He partnered with Scott McCain to make the doubles quarter-finals at the 1985 Tokyo Outdoor Grand Prix event and in the same year was runner-up in the singles at the Montreal Challenger. His only Challenger title came in doubles, at Berkeley in 1986, with Peter Wright. He featured in the main draw of the 1986 US Open paired with Brett Dickinson, as lucky losers from the qualifying draw. The 1986 season was his final year on the professional tour.

== Challenger titles ==
=== Doubles: (1) ===
No.	Year	Tournament	Surface	Partner	Opponents	Score
1.	1986	Berkeley, United States	Hard	(United States) Peter Wright	(United States) Mike Bauer (United States) Charles Strode	6–4, 6–3
