= Erik Van't Hof =

American tennis player

- Full name: Erik Victor Van't Hof
- Country (sports): United States
- Residence: Manhattan Beach, California, U.S.
- Born: November 12, 1960 (age 64); Rotterdam, Netherlands
- Height: 1.85 m (6 ft 1 in)
- Turned pro: 1983
- Plays: Right-handed (one-handed backhand)
- Prize money: $23,043

Singles
- Career record: 1–3 (25%)
- Career titles: 0
- Highest ranking: No. 373 (December 10, 1984)

Doubles
- Career record: 18–35 (33.96%)
- Career titles: 0
- Highest ranking: No. 105 (November 12, 1984)

Grand Slam doubles results
- Australian Open: R2 (1985) R2 (1984)
- Wimbledon: R4 (1985)
- US Open: R3 (1985) R2 (1984)

Erik Victor Van't Hof (born November 12, 1960) is a former professional tennis player from the United States.

== Early life ==
Van't Hof was born in the Dutch city of Rotterdam but grew up in Downey, California.

== Education ==
He was a four year scholarship athlete at Southern Methodist University (SMU). In 1983, Van't Hof graduated with a bachelor's degree in Business Administration.

== Professional career ==
Primarily a doubles specialist, Van't Hof partnered with Derek Tarr at the 1984 U.S. Clay Court Championships, where they made the quarter-finals by upsetting second seeds Pavel Složil and Ferdi Taygan. His best singles performance on tour came in 1984 when he made the second round of the Tokyo Outdoor Grand Prix event, with a win over Huub van Boeckel.

During his career he competed in the main draw of the men's doubles competitions at the Australian Open, Wimbledon Championships and US Open. At the 1985 Wimbledon Championships, Van't Hof teamed up with Brian Levine to make the third round.

== Challenger circuit titles ==
| Result | No. | Year | Tournament | Surface | Partner | Opponents | Score |
|---|---|---|---|---|---|---|---|
| Win | 1. | 1985 | Nagoya, Japan | Outdoor/Hard | (India) Sashi Menon | (Japan) Hitoshi Shirato (Japan) Eiji Takeuchi | 6–3, 6–2 |
| Win | 2. | 1985 | West Palm Beach, Florida, U.S. | Outdoor/Clay | (South Africa) Derek Tarr | (Mexico) Leonardo Lavalle (Peru) Jaime Yzaga | 6–2, 6–0 |
