= 1984 Australian Open =

- Date: 26 November – 9 December 1984
- Edition: 73rd
- Category: Grand Slam (ITF)
- Surface: Grass
- Location: Melbourne, Australia
- Venue: Kooyong Lawn Tennis Club

Champions

Men's singles
- (Sweden) Mats Wilander

Women's singles
- (United States) Chris Evert-Lloyd

Men's doubles
- (Australia) Mark Edmondson / (United States) Sherwood Stewart

Women's doubles
- (United States) Martina Navratilova / (United States) Pam Shriver

Boys' singles
- (Australia) Mark Kratzmann

Girls' singles
- (United Kingdom) Annabel Croft

Boys' doubles
- (Australia) Mark Kratzmann / (Australia) Mike Baroch

Girls' doubles
- (Australia) Louise Field / (Soviet Union) Larisa Savchenko
- Australian Open

The 1984 Australian Open was a tennis tournament played on grass courts at the Kooyong Lawn Tennis Club in Melbourne in Victoria in Australia. Held from 26 November through 9 December 1984, it was the 73rd edition of the Australian Open. American Chris Evert became the first tennis player in the open era to win 1,000 matches during this fortnight, ending the tournament with the women's title and a match winning record of 1,003 – 97. Sweden's Mats Willander won the men's single title, successfully defending his 1983 Australian Open championship picking up his third Grand Slam title.

== Seniors ==
=== Men's singles ===
(Sweden) Mats Wilander defeated (South Africa) Kevin Curren 6–7^{(5–7)}, 6–4, 7–6^{(7–3)}, 6–2

- It was Wilander's 3rd career Grand Slam title and his 2nd Australian Open title.

=== Women's singles ===
(United States) Chris Evert defeated (Czechoslovakia) Helena Suková 6–7^{(4–7)}, 6–1, 6–3

- It was Evert's 16th career Grand Slam title and her 2nd and last Australian Open title.
- Helena Suková ended Martina Navratilova's streak after winning 6 majors in a row and stopped Navratilova 2 matches short of winning the Grand Slam.

=== Men's doubles ===
(Australia) Mark Edmondson / (United States) Sherwood Stewart defeated (Sweden) Joakim Nyström / (Sweden) Mats Wilander 6–2, 6–2, 7–5

- It was Edmondson's 5th career Grand Slam title and his 5th and last Australian Open title. It was Stewart's 3rd career Grand Slam title and his 1st Australian Open title.

=== Women's doubles ===
(United States) Martina Navratilova / (United States) Pam Shriver defeated (West Germany) Claudia Kohde-Kilsch / (Czechoslovakia) Helena Suková 6–3, 6–4

- It was Navratilova's 30th career Grand Slam title and her 6th Australian Open title. It was Shriver's 10th career Grand Slam title and her 3rd Australian Open title. With this victory Navratilova and Shriver completed the first doubles Grand Slam in a calendar year in the Open Era, a feat not matched until Martina Hingis completed the same Grand Slam with two partners in 1998.

=== Mixed doubles ===
The competition was not held between 1970 and 1986.

== Juniors ==
=== Boys' singles ===
(Australia) Mark Kratzmann defeated (Australia) Patrick Flynn 6–4, 6–1

=== Girls' singles ===
(United Kingdom) Annabel Croft defeated (Sweden) Helena Dahlström 6–0, 6–1

=== Boys' doubles ===
(Australia) Mike Baroch / (Australia) Mark Kratzmann defeated (Australia) Brett Custer / (Australia) David Macpherson 6–2, 5–7, 7–5

=== Girls' doubles ===
(Australia) Louise Field / (Soviet Union) Larisa Savchenko defeated (Australia) Jackie Masters / (New Zealand) Michelle Parun 7–6, 6–2

Preceded by 1984 US Open	Grand Slams	Succeeded by 1985 French Open
