= 1985 Japan Open Tennis Championships – Women's singles =

Women's singles
- 1985 Japan Open Tennis Championships

Final
- Champion: (Argentina) Gabriela Sabatini
- Runner-up: (United States) Linda Gates
- Score: 6–3, 6–4

Details
- Draw: 32 (3Q)
- Seeds: 8

Events
| Singles | men | women |
| Doubles | men | women |
| ← 1984 · | Japan Open | · 1986 → |

Lilian Drescher was the defending champion, but lost in the semifinals to Gabriela Sabatini.

Sabatini won the title by defeating Linda Gates 6–3, 6–4 in the final.

== Seeds ==
1. (Argentina) Gabriela Sabatini (champion)
2. (United States) Beth Herr (second round)
3. (Switzerland) Lilian Drescher (semifinals)
4. (Socialist Federal Republic of Yugoslavia) Mima Jaušovec (first round)
5. (Greece) Angeliki Kanellopoulou (quarterfinals)
6. (Peru) Laura Gildemeister (semifinals)
7. (Czechoslovakia) Andrea Holíková (quarterfinals)
8. (West Germany) Myriam Schropp (quarterfinals)

== Draw ==
=== Key ===
- Q = Qualifier
- WC = Wild card
- LL = Lucky loser
- Alt = Alternate
- SE = Special exempt
- PR = Protected ranking
- ITF = ITF entry
- JE = Junior exempt
- w/o = Walkover
- r = Retired
- d = Defaulted
- SR = Special ranking

=== Finals ===
Semifinals
1 | (Argentina) Gabriela Sabatini | 1 | 6 | 6
3 | (Switzerland) Lilian Drescher | 6 | 3 | 3
6 | (Peru) Laura Gildemeister | 3 | 6 | 3
(United States) Linda Gates | 6 | 2 | 6

Final
1 | (Argentina) Gabriela Sabatini | 6 | 6
(United States) Linda Gates | 3 | 4

=== Top half ===
First round
1 | (Argentina) G Sabatini | 6 | 6
(Japan) E Okagawa | 1 | 1
Q | (Greece) O Tsarbopoulou | 2 | 4
(United States) K Kinney | 6 | 6
(Japan) M Yanagi | 6 | 6
(Peru) P Vásquez | 1 | 1
(Canada) J Young | 3 | 1
7 | (Czechoslovakia) A Holíková | 6 | 6
3 | (Switzerland) L Drescher | 6 | 6
(Hungary) C Bartos-Cserepy | 3 | 2
(Japan) Rie Nakazawa | 4 | 2
(Japan) A Kijimuta | 6 | 6
(Brazil) N Dias | 1 | 1
(Argentina) M Paz | 6 | 6
(Brazil) P Medrado | 5 | 6
5 | (Greece) A Kanellopoulou | 7 | 7

Second round
1 | (Argentina) G Sabatini | 6 | 6
(United States) K Kinney | 0 | 0
' (Japan) M Yanagi | 6 | 2 | 1
7 | (Czechoslovakia) A Holíková | 3 | 6 | 6
3 | (Switzerland) L Drescher | 6 | 6
(Japan) A Kijimuta | 3 | 0
(Argentina) M Paz | 0 | 4
5 | (Greece) A Kanellopoulou | 6 | 6

Quarterfinals
1 | (Argentina) G Sabatini | 6 | 6
7 | (Czechoslovakia) A Holíková | 0 | 1
3 | (Switzerland) L Drescher | 6 | 6
5 | (Greece) A Kanellopoulou | 3 | 1

Semifinals
1 | (Argentina) G Sabatini | 1 | 6 | 6
3 | (Switzerland) L Drescher | 6 | 3 | 3

=== Bottom half ===
First round
6 | (Peru) L Gildemeister | 6 | 7
Q | (United States) D Farrell | 2 | 6
(Australia) J Thompson | 6 | 6
Q | (United Kingdom) J Louis | 3 | 4
(United States) H Ludloff | 2 | 3
(New Zealand) B Cordwell | 6 | 6
(United States) A Holton | 2 | 7 | 6
4 | (Socialist Federal Republic of Yugoslavia) M Jaušovec | 6 | 5 | 3
8 | (West Germany) M Schropp | 1 | 6 | 6
(Japan) Y Koizumi | 6 | 3 | 2
(Japan) E Inoue | 6 | 6
(Argentina) A Villagrán | 1 | 2
(United States) L Gates | 6 | 3 | 6
(Sweden) M Lindström | 1 | 6 | 4
(United States) S Foltz | 6 | 4 | 3
2 | (United States) B Herr | 4 | 6 | 6

Second round
6 | (Peru) L Gildemeister | 6 | 6 | 7
(Australia) J Thompson | 7 | 3 | 6
(New Zealand) B Cordwell | 4 | 4
(United States) A Holton | 6 | 6
8 | (West Germany) M Schropp | 7 | 7
(Japan) E Inoue | 5 | 5
(United States) L Gates | 6 | 6
2 | (United States) B Herr | 3 | 1

Quarterfinals
6 | (Peru) L Gildemeister | 6 | 4 | 6
(United States) A Holton | 3 | 6 | 0
8 | (West Germany) M Schropp | 4 | 4
(United States) L Gates | 6 | 6

Semifinals
6 | (Peru) L Gildemeister | 3 | 6 | 3
(United States) L Gates | 6 | 2 | 6
