= 1986 Virginia Slims of Arizona – Doubles =

Doubles
- 1986 Virginia Slims of Arizona

Final
- Champions: (United States) Susan Mascarin (United States) Betsy Nagelsen
- Runners-up: (United States) Linda Gates (United States) Alycia Moulton
- Score: 6–3, 5–7, 6–4

Details
- Draw: 16
- Seeds: 4

Events
Singles	Doubles
Virginia Slims of Arizona	· 1987 →

The 1986 Virginia Slims of Arizona doubles was one of the events of the 1986 Virginia Slims of Arizona tennis tournament. It was played between March 23 and March 29, 1986, at the Jordan Tennis and Racquet Center in Phoenix, Arizona in the United States. The draw consisted of 16 pairs of which 4 were seeded.

Susan Mascarin and Betsy Nagelsen won the title by defeating Linda Gates and Alycia Moulton 6–3, 5–7, 6–4 in the final.

== Seeds ==
1. (United States) Linda Gates / (United States) Alycia Moulton (final)
2. (United States) Susan Mascarin / (United States) Betsy Nagelsen (champions)
3. (United States) Ann Henricksson / (United States) Terry Holladay (semifinals)
4. (Czechoslovakia) Iva Budařová / (United States) Beth Herr (quarterfinals)

== Draw ==
=== Key ===
- Q = Qualifier
- WC = Wild card
- LL = Lucky loser
- Alt = Alternate
- SE = Special exempt
- PR = Protected ranking
- ITF = ITF entry
- JE = Junior exempt
- w/o = Walkover
- r = Retired
- d = Defaulted
- SR = Special ranking

=== Draw ===
First round
1	(United States) L Gates (United States) A Moulton	6	6
(United States) Ca MacGregor (United States) Cy MacGregor	2	1
(United States) L Antonoplis (Australia) P Whytcross	7	6
(United States) K Huebner (Czechoslovakia) R Maršíková	6	1
4	(Czechoslovakia) I Budařová (United States) B Herr	6	3	6
(United States) A Holton (Argentina) M Paz	4	6	3
(United States) P Louie (United States) P Smith	3	6	7
(United States) C Benjamin (United States) H Na	6	1	5
(United States) L Allen (United States) P Barg	6	6
(Brazil) N Dias (United States) V Nelson-Dunbar	1	2
(France) S Amiach (United States) H Ludloff	4	1
3	(United States) A Henricksson (United States) T Holladay	6	6
(New Zealand) B Cordwell (Argentina) A Villagrán	6	6	6
(United States) C Copeland (United States) T Mochizuki	7	2	3
(Australia) S Leo (Brazil) C Monteiro	2	3
2	(United States) S Mascarin (United States) B Nagelsen	6	6

Quarterfinals
1	(United States) L Gates (United States) A Moulton	7	6
(United States) L Antonoplis (Australia) P Whytcross	6	2
4	(Czechoslovakia) I Budařová (United States) B Herr	3	4
(United States) P Louie (United States) P Smith	6	6
(United States) L Allen (United States) P Barg	2	1
3	(United States) A Henricksson (United States) T Holladay	6	6
(New Zealand) B Cordwell (Argentina) A Villagrán	3	4
2	(United States) S Mascarin (United States) B Nagelsen	6	6

Semifinals
1	(United States) L Gates (United States) A Moulton	3	6	6
(United States) P Louie (United States) P Smith	6	4	4
3	(United States) A Henricksson (United States) T Holladay	3	4
2	(United States) S Mascarin (United States) B Nagelsen	6	6

Final
1	(United States) L Gates (United States) A Moulton	3	7	4
2	(United States) S Mascarin (United States) B Nagelsen	6	5	6
