= 1986 Virginia Slims of Arizona =

Tennis tournament

- Date: March 24–30
- Edition: 1st
- Draw: 32S / 16D
- Prize money: $75,000
- Surface: Hard / indoor
- Location: Phoenix, Arizona, U.S.
- Venue: Jordan Tennis and Racquet Center

Champions

Singles
- (United States) Beth Herr

Doubles
- (United States) Susan Mascarin / (United States) Betsy Nagelsen
Virginia Slims of Arizona	· 1987 →

The 1986 Virginia Slims of Arizona, also known as the Virginia Slims of Phoenix, was a women's tennis tournament played on indoor hard courts at the Jordan Tennis and Racquet Center in Phoenix, Arizona in the United States and was part of the 1986 Virginia Slims World Championship Series. It was the inaugural edition of the tournament and was held from March 24 through March 30, 1986. Unseeded Beth Herr won the singles title.

== Finals ==
=== Singles ===
(United States) Beth Herr defeated (United States) Ann Henricksson 6–0, 3–6, 7–5

- It was Herr's only singles title of her career.

=== Doubles ===
(United States) Susan Mascarin / (United States) Betsy Nagelsen defeated (United States) Linda Gates / (United States) Alycia Moulton 6–3, 5–7, 6–4

== See also ==
- 1986 WCT Scottsdale Open – men's tournament in Scottsdale
