= 1985 Japan Open Tennis Championships – Women's doubles =

Women's doubles
- 1985 Japan Open Tennis Championships

Final
- Champions: (New Zealand) Belinda Cordwell (New Zealand) Julie Richardson
- Runners-up: (Peru) Laura Gildemeister (United States) Beth Herr
- Score: 6–4, 6–4

Details
- Draw: 16
- Seeds: 4

Events
Singles	men	women
Doubles	men	women
← 1984 ·	Japan Open	· 1986 →

Betsy Nagelsen and Candy Reynolds were the defending champions, but none competed this year.

Belinda Cordwell and Julie Richardson won the title by defeating Laura Gildemeister and Beth Herr 6–4, 6–4 in the final.

== Seeds ==
1. (Peru) Laura Gildemeister / (United States) Beth Herr (final)
2. (Argentina) Mercedes Paz / (Argentina) Gabriela Sabatini (quarterfinals)
3. (United States) Amy Holton / (Argentina) Adriana Villagrán (first round)
4. (United States) Linda Gates / (United States) Heather Ludloff (first round)

== Draw ==
=== Key ===
- Q = Qualifier
- WC = Wild card
- LL = Lucky loser
- Alt = Alternate
- SE = Special exempt
- PR = Protected ranking
- ITF = ITF entry
- JE = Junior exempt
- w/o = Walkover
- r = Retired
- d = Defaulted
- SR = Special ranking

=== Draw ===
First round
1	(Peru) L Gildemeister (United States) B Herr	6	6
(Czechoslovakia) A Holíková (Japan) N Sato	2	2
(Greece) A Kanellopoulou (West Germany) M Schropp	7	6^{1}	6^{4}
(United States) D Farrell (United States) Carol Watson	5	7^{7}	7^{7}
4	(United States) L Gates (United States) H Ludloff	2	5
(Canada) H Pelletier (Australia) J Thompson	6	7
(United States) H Crowe (United States) K Kinney	5	5
(Sweden) M Lindström (Japan) M Yanagi	7	7
(New Zealand) B Cordwell (New Zealand) J Richardson	7	6
(Switzerland) L Drescher (Japan) E Inoue	5	4
(Socialist Federal Republic of Yugoslavia) M Jaušovec (Poland) I Kuczyńska	6	6
3	(United States) A Holton (Argentina) A Villagrán	1	4
(United States) L Lewis (United States) M Schillig	6^{0}	7^{8}	5
(Brazil) N Dias (Brazil) P Medrado	7^{7}	6^{6}	7
(United States) S Foltz (Peru) P Vásquez	3	2
2	(Argentina) M Paz (Argentina) G Sabatini	6	6

Quarterfinals
1	(Peru) L Gildemeister (United States) B Herr	6	6
(United States) D Farrell (United States) Carol Watson	4	3
(Canada) H Pelletier (Australia) J Thompson	2	4
(Sweden) M Lindström (Japan) M Yanagi	6	6
(New Zealand) B Cordwell (New Zealand) J Richardson	6	2	6
(Socialist Federal Republic of Yugoslavia) M Jaušovec (Poland) I Kuczyńska	4	6	4
(Brazil) N Dias (Brazil) P Medrado	7^{9}	6
2	(Argentina) M Paz (Argentina) G Sabatini	6^{7}	2

Semifinals
1	(Peru) L Gildemeister (United States) B Herr	7	6
(Sweden) M Lindström (Japan) M Yanagi	5	3
(New Zealand) B Cordwell (New Zealand) J Richardson	6	6
(Brazil) N Dias (Brazil) P Medrado	4	3

Final
1	(Peru) L Gildemeister (United States) B Herr	4	4
(New Zealand) B Cordwell (New Zealand) J Richardson	6	6
