= 1988 Virginia Slims of Arizona – Singles =

Singles
- 1988 Virginia Slims of Arizona
- 1987 Champion: (United States) Anne White

Final
- Champion: (Bulgaria) Manuela Maleeva
- Runner-up: (South Africa) Dianne Van Rensburg
- Score: 6–3, 4–6, 6–2

Events
Singles	Doubles
← 1987 ·	Virginia Slims of Arizona	· 1989 →

Anne White was the defending champion but lost in the first round to Elly Hakami.

Manuela Maleeva won in the final 6–3, 4–6, 6–2 against Dianne Van Rensburg.

== Seeds ==
A champion seed is indicated in bold text while text in italics indicates the round in which that seed was eliminated.

1. (Bulgaria) **Manuela Maleeva (champion)**
2. (United States) Patty Fendick (second round)
3. (Brazil) Neige Dias (second round)
4. (South Africa) Rosalyn Fairbank (quarterfinals)
5. (Australia) Dianne Balestrat (first round)
6. (United States) Peanut Louie-Harper (first round)
7. n/a
8. (United States) Terry Phelps (quarterfinals)

== Draw ==
=== Key ===
- Q = Qualifier
- WC = Wild card
- LL = Lucky loser
- Alt = Alternate
- SE = Special exempt
- PR = Protected ranking
- ITF = ITF entry
- JE = Junior exempt
- w/o = Walkover
- r = Retired
- d = Defaulted
- SR = Special ranking

First round
1	(Bulgaria) **M Maleeva**	**6**	**7**
(United States) L Antonoplis	1	5
(Sweden) **M Lindström**	**6**	1	**7**
(United States) H Na	4	**6**	6
(United States) **C Benjamin**	1	**6**	**6**
LL	(United States) K Keil	**6**	3	1
(Czechoslovakia) A Holíková	0	1
8	(United States) **T Phelps**	**6**	**6**
4	(South Africa) **R Fairbank**	**6**	4	**6**
(United States) B Nagelsen	4	**6**	3
(United States) H Ludloff	3	1
(United States) **A Grossman**	**6**	**6**
Q	(United States) **L Allen**	**6**	0	**7**
(United States) B Herr	2	**6**	6
(United States) **E Burgin**	**6**	**6**
6	(United States) P Louie-Harper	3	3
5	(Australia) D Balestrat	2	**6**	5
(United States) **W White**	**6**	4	**7**
(United States) M L Daniels	1	3
(United States) **A Ivan**	**6**	**6**
Q	(Poland) R Baranski	3	0
(South Africa) **D Van Rensburg**	**6**	**6**
(United States) M Werdel	5	2
3	(Brazil) **N Dias**	**7**	**6**
(United States) A Smith	**6**	0	1
(United States) **E Hakami**	3	**6**	**6**
Q	(United States) **K Steinmetz**	**7**	**6**
(New Zealand) J Richardson	5	4
(United States) **S Sloane**	2	**6**	**7**
(United States) M Torres	**6**	4	5
Q	(Sweden) M Strandlund	**7**	6	4
2	(United States) **P Fendick**	6	**7**	**6**

Second round
1	(Bulgaria) **M Maleeva**	**6**	**6**
(Sweden) M Lindström	4	1
(United States) C Benjamin	2	2
8	(United States) **T Phelps**	**6**	**6**
4	(South Africa) **R Fairbank**	**6**	2	**6**
(United States) A Grossman	4	**6**	2
Q	(United States) L Allen	**6**	3	4
(United States) **E Burgin**	1	**6**	**6**
(United States) **W White**	**6**	**7**
(United States) A Ivan	0	5
(South Africa) **D Van Rensburg**	**7**	**6**
3	(Brazil) N Dias	5	2
(United States) **E Hakami**	**7**	**6**
Q	(United States) K Steinmetz	6	4
(United States) **S Sloane**	**6**	**1**
2	(United States) P Fendick	0	0	r

Quarterfinals
1	(Bulgaria) **M Maleeva**	**6**	**6**
8	(United States) T Phelps	4	2
4	(South Africa) R Fairbank	5	**6**	3
(United States) **E Burgin**	**7**	1	**6**
(United States) W White	1	2
(South Africa) **D Van Rensburg**	**6**	**6**
(United States) E Hakami	2	**6**	0
(United States) **S Sloane**	**6**	4	**6**

Semifinals
1	(Bulgaria) **M Maleeva**	**6**	**6**
(United States) E Burgin	1	1
(South Africa) **D Van Rensburg**	**6**	**6**
(United States) S Sloane	2	3

Final
1	(Bulgaria) **Manuela Maleeva**	**6**	4	**6**
(South Africa) Dianne Van Rensburg	3	**6**	2
