= 1988 Virginia Slims of Arizona – Doubles =

Doubles
- 1988 Virginia Slims of Arizona
- 1987 Champions: (United States) Penny Barg (United States) Beth Herr

Final
- Champions: (United States) Elise Burgin (South Africa) Rosalyn Fairbank
- Runners-up: (United States) Beth Herr (United States) Terry Phelps
- Score: 6–7, 7–6, 7–6

Events
Singles	Doubles
← 1987 ·	Virginia Slims of Arizona	· 1989 →

Penny Barg and Beth Herr were the defending champions but only Herr competed that year with Terry Phelps.

Herr and Phelps lost in the final 6–7, 7–6, 7–6 against Elise Burgin and Rosalyn Fairbank.

== Seeds ==
Champion seeds are indicated in bold text while text in italics indicates the round in which those seeds were eliminated.

1. (United States) **Elise Burgin** / (South Africa) **Rosalyn Fairbank (champions)**
2. (South Africa) Lise Gregory / (South Africa) Dianne Van Rensburg (first round)
3. (Australia) Jenny Byrne / (Australia) Janine Tremelling (quarterfinals)
4. (United States) Patty Fendick / (United States) Anne Smith (semifinals)

== Draw ==
=== Key ===
- Q = Qualifier
- WC = Wild card
- LL = Lucky loser
- Alt = Alternate
- SE = Special exempt
- PR = Protected ranking
- ITF = ITF entry
- JE = Junior exempt
- w/o = Walkover
- r = Retired
- d = Defaulted
- SR = Special ranking

First round

Quarterfinals

Semifinals

Final

1
- (United States) **E Burgin**
- (South Africa) **R Fairbank**
**6**
**6**

- (United States) T Collins
- (United States) E Hakami
4
3

1
- (United States) **E Burgin**
- (South Africa) **R Fairbank**
**6**
**7**

- (United States) **Ca MacGregor**
- (United States) **Cy MacGregor**
**7**
**6**

- (United States) Ca MacGregor
- (United States) Cy MacGregor
2
5

- (Sweden) A-K Olsson
- (Australia) A Scott
5
3

1
- (United States) **E Burgin**
- (South Africa) **R Fairbank**
**6**
**6**

4
- (United States) **P Fendick**
- (United States) **A Smith**
**7**
**6**

4
- (United States) P Fendick
- (United States) A Smith
3
4

- (United States) L Allen
- (Poland) I Kuczyńska
5
3

4
- (United States) **P Fendick**
- (United States) **A Smith**
**6**
2
**6**

- (United States) M L Daniels
- (United States) H Ludloff
6
3

- (United States) C Benjamin
- (Sweden) M Lindström
4
**6**
1

- (United States) **C Benjamin**
- (Sweden) **M Lindström**
**7**
**6**

1
- (United States) **Elise Burgin**
- (South Africa) **Rosalyn Fairbank**
6
**7**
**7**

- (United States) P Louie-Harper
- (United States) W White
**6**
2
3

- (United States) Beth Herr
- (United States) Terry Phelps
**7**
6
6

- (United States) **B Herr**
- (United States) **T Phelps**
4
**6**
**6**

- (United States) **B Herr**
- (United States) **T Phelps**
**7**
**6**

- (United States) J Fuchs
- (Sweden) M Strandlund
2
2

3
- (Australia) J Byrne
- (Australia) J Tremelling
5
2

3
- (Australia) **J Byrne**
- (Australia) **J Tremelling**
**6**
**6**

- (United States) **B Herr**
- (United States) **T Phelps**
**6**
**6**

- (United States) H Na
- (United States) M Van Nostrand
4
5

- (Australia) D Balestrat
- (United States) R Casals
1
4

- (Brazil) **N Dias**
- (New Zealand) **J Richardson**
**6**
**7**

- (Brazil) N Dias
- (New Zealand) J Richardson
4
**7**
4

- (Australia) **D Balestrat**
- (United States) **R Casals**
**6**
4
**7**

- (Australia) **D Balestrat**
- (United States) **R Casals**
**6**
5
**6**

2
- (South Africa) L Gregory
- (South Africa) D Van Rensburg
4
**6**
5
