= 1987 Virginia Slims of Arizona – Singles =

Singles
- 1987 Virginia Slims of Arizona

Final
- Champion: (United States) Anne White
- Runner-up: (Australia) Dianne Balestrat
- Score: 6–1, 6–2

Details
- Draw: 56
- Seeds: 14

Events
Singles	Doubles
- Virginia Slims of Arizona

Beth Herr was the defending champion, but lost in the second round to Carina Karlsson.

Anne White won the title by defeating Dianne Balestrat 6–1, 6–2 in the final.

== Seeds ==
The first eight seeds received a bye to the second round.

1. (Australia) Dianne Balestrat (final)
2. (United States) Bonnie Gadusek (second round)
3. (United States) Beth Herr (second round)
4. (United States) Peanut Louie Harper (third round)
5. (United States) Anne White (champion)
6. (United States) Ann Henricksson (quarterfinals)
7. (United States) Molly Van Nostrand (third round)
8. (Brazil) Niege Dias (third round)
9. (United States) Debbie Spence (second round)
10. (Hong Kong) Patricia Hy (second round)
11. (United States) Mary Lou Piatek (first round)
12. (Brazil) Patricia Medrado (second round)
13. (Netherlands) Marcella Mesker (first round)
14. (West Germany) Isabel Cueto (third round)

== Draw ==
Key

- Q = Qualifier
- WC = Wild card
- LL = Lucky loser
- Alt = Alternate
- ITF = ITF entry
- PR = Protected ranking
- SR = Special ranking
- SE = Special exempt
- JE = Junior exempt
- JR = Junior Accelerator Programme entrant
- CO = College Accelerator Programme entrant
- NG = Next Gen Accelerator Program entrant
- w/o = Walkover
- r = Retired
- d = Defaulted

=== Finals ===
Quarterfinals
1	(Australia) Dianne Balestrat	6	6
(France) Catherine Suire	2	0
(United States) Sharon Walsh-Pete	7	6
6	(United States) Ann Henricksson	6	3
5	(United States) Anne White	6	6
(Switzerland) Christiane Jolissaint	3	2
(United States) Penny Barg	7	5	3
(Sweden) Maria Lindström	6	7	6

Semifinals
1	(Australia) Dianne Balestrat	7	7
(United States) Sharon Walsh-Pete	5	5
5	(United States) Anne White	6	6
(Sweden) Maria Lindström	2	4

Final
1	(Australia) Dianne Balestrat	1	2
5	(United States) Anne White	6	6

=== Top half ===
==== Section 1 ====
First round
(United States) AM Fernandez	4	4
(Belgium) S Wasserman	6	6
(United States) K Kinney	4	3
(United States) C Reynolds	6	6
(Argentina) A Villagrán	3	7	4
14	(West Germany) I Cueto	6	6	6
(France) C Suire	6	6
(United States) Wendy Ouwendijk	1	2
(Australia) S Leo	1	2
12	(Brazil) P Medrado	6	6
(Netherlands) H ter Riet	6	4	2
(United States) T Mochizuki	4	6	6

Second round
1	(Australia) D Balestrat	6	6
(Belgium) S Wasserman	3	3
(United States) C Reynolds	3	2
14	(West Germany) I Cueto	6	6
(France) C Suire	5	7	7
12	(Brazil) P Medrado	7	5	5
(United States) T Mochizuki	7	3	3
8	(Brazil) N Dias	5	6	6

Third round
1	(Australia) D Balestrat	6	6
14	(West Germany) I Cueto	3	2
(France) C Suire	7	6
8	(Brazil) N Dias	5	2

Quarterfinals
1	(Australia) D Balestrat	6	6
(France) C Suire	2	0

==== Section 2 ====
First round
(Sweden) C Karlsson	6	6
(United States) T Holladay	3	1
(New Zealand) J Richardson	3	3
(United States) S Walsh-Pete	6	6
(United States) H Cioffi	2	6	3
(United States) V Nelson-Dunbar	6	2	6
9	(United States) D Spence	6	6
(Argentina) P Tarabini	0	1
(West Germany) C Porwik	6	7
(Switzerland) E Krapl	1	6
(United States) N Sodupe	6	6
(West Germany) A Betzner	3	2

Second round
3	(United States) B Herr	2	4
(Sweden) C Karlsson	6	6
(United States) S Walsh-Pete	6	6
(United States) V Nelson-Dunbar	4	3
9	(United States) D Spence	2	1
(West Germany) C Porwik	6	6
(United States) N Sodupe	2	6	1
6	(United States) A Henricksson	6	4	6

Third round
(Sweden) C Karlsson	5	4
(United States) S Walsh-Pete	7	6
(West Germany) C Porwik	2	6	1
6	(United States) A Henricksson	6	4	6

Quarterfinals
(United States) S Walsh-Pete	7	6
6	(United States) A Henricksson	6	3

=== Bottom half ===
==== Section 3 ====
First round
(Czechoslovakia) A Holíková	2	4
(United States) B Gerken	6	6
(United Kingdom) A Croft	6	6
(United States) S Sloane	3	1
(United States) E Hakami	6	6
13	(Netherlands) M Mesker	4	4
(Israel) Shira Gafni	1	1
(West Germany) W Probst	6	6
(Mexico) H Steden	4	3
(Switzerland) C Jolissaint	6	6
(United States) K Keil	6	6
(United States) A Ingram	1	3

Second round
5	(United States) A White	6	3	7
(United States) B Gerken	3	6	5
(United Kingdom) A Croft	6	6
(United States) E Hakami	2	2
(West Germany) W Probst	6	4	6
(Switzerland) C Jolissaint	4	6	7
(United States) K Keil	7	2	5
4	(United States) P Louie-Harper	5	6	7

Third round
5	(United States) A White	7	6
(United Kingdom) A Croft	5	1
(Switzerland) C Jolissaint	3	6	6
4	(United States) P Louie-Harper	6	4	4

Quarterfinals
5	(United States) A White	6	6
(Switzerland) C Jolissaint	3	2

==== Section 4 ====
First round
(United States) H Ludloff	0	1
(Australia) J Byrne	6	6
(Brazil) G Miró	3	3
(United States) P Barg	6	6
(South Africa) J Mundel	2	2
10	(Hong Kong) P Hy	6	6
11	(United States) ML Piatek	2	3
(Austria) J Pölzl	6	6
(Brazil) C Monteiro	4	7	6
(Peru) P Vásquez	6	5	7
(Czechoslovakia) J Novotná	0	5
(Sweden) M Lindström	6	7

Second round
7	(United States) M Van Nostrand	6	6
(Australia) J Byrne	4	2
(United States) P Barg	7	6
10	(Hong Kong) P Hy	5	2
(Austria) J Pölzl	4	6	6
(Peru) P Vásquez	6	4	3
(Sweden) M Lindström	6	6
2	(United States) B Gadusek	2	3

Third round
7	(United States) M Van Nostrand	6	5
(United States) P Barg	7	7
(Austria) J Pölzl	6	2	2
(Sweden) M Lindström	0	6	6

Quarterfinals
(United States) P Barg	7	5	3
(Sweden) M Lindström	6	7	6
