= 1986 Japan Open Tennis Championships – Men's singles =

Men's singles
- 1986 Japan Open Tennis Championships

Final
- Champion: (India) Ramesh Krishnan
- Runner-up: (Sweden) Johan Carlsson
- Score: 6–3, 6–1

Details
- Draw: 64 (8Q / 4WC)
- Seeds: 16

Events
Singles	men	women
Doubles	men	women
- Japan Open

Scott Davis was the defending champion, but lost in the third round to Jonathan Canter 6–7, 6–3, 2–6. Ramesh Krishnan won the title defeating Johan Carlsson in the final 6–3, 6–1.

== Seeds ==
1. (United States) David Pate (quarterfinals)
2. (United States) Jimmy Arias (second round)
3. (United States) Matt Anger (third round)
4. (United States) Jonathan Canter (quarterfinals)
5. (India) Ramesh Krishnan (champion)
6. (Peru) Jaime Yzaga (semifinals)
7. (United States) Todd Witsken (second round)
8. (United States) Bud Schultz (first round)
9. (West Germany) Damir Keretić (third round)
10. (United States) Greg Holmes (second round)
11. (United States) John Sadri (third round)
12. (United States) Marty Davis (third round)
13. (United States) Scott Davis (third round)
14. (Canada) Glenn Michibata (first round)
15. (United States) Gary Donnelly (second round)
16. (United States) Derrick Rostagno (third round)

== Draw ==
Key

- Q = Qualifier
- WC = Wild card
- LL = Lucky loser
- Alt = Alternate
- ITF = ITF entry
- PR = Protected ranking
- SR = Special ranking
- SE = Special exempt
- JE = Junior exempt
- JR = Junior Accelerator Programme entrant
- CO = College Accelerator Programme entrant
- NG = Next Gen Accelerator Program entrant
- w/o = Walkover
- r = Retired
- d = Defaulted

=== Finals ===
Quarterfinals
1	(United States) David Pate	3	3
Q	(United States) Kelly Jones	6	6
4	(United States) Jonathan Canter	6	3	4
5	(India) Ramesh Krishnan	4	6	6
6	(Peru) Jaime Yzaga	6	6	6
(United States) Mike De Palmer	7	4	2
(United States) Paul Chamberlin	4	6
(Sweden) Johan Carlsson	6	7

Semifinals
Q	(United States) Kelly Jones	0	5
5	(India) Ramesh Krishnan	6	7
6	(Peru) Jaime Yzaga	3	0
(Sweden) Johan Carlsson	6	6

Final
5	(India) Ramesh Krishnan	6	6
(Sweden) Johan Carlsson	3	1

=== Top half ===
==== Section 1 ====
First round
1	(United States) D Pate	7	6
(United States) B Scanlon	5	4
(United States) R Brown	6	6
WC	(Japan) T Kuramitsu	2	1
(United States) J Grabb	6	6
(United States) S Denton	4	3
(United States) J Pugh	3	2
15	(United States) G Donnelly	6	6
9	(West Germany) D Keretić	3	7	6
LL	(United States) K Richter	6	5	3
Q	(Canada) H McDadi	6	3	4
(United States) J Lapidus	3	6	6
(United States) J Levine	6	7	1
(New Zealand) S Guy	7	6	6
Q	(United States) K Jones	4	6	6
8	(United States) B Schultz	6	1	1

Second round
1	(United States) D Pate	6	6
(United States) R Brown	3	4
(United States) J Grabb	6	1	6
15	(United States) G Donnelly	4	6	3
9	(West Germany) D Keretić	6	6
(United States) J Lapidus	4	1
(New Zealand) S Guy	4	4
Q	(United States) K Jones	6	6

Third round
1	(United States) D Pate	6	6
(United States) J Grabb	4	4
9	(West Germany) D Keretić	6	6	6
Q	(United States) K Jones	4	7	7

Quarterfinals
1	(United States) D Pate	3	3
Q	(United States) K Jones	6	6

==== Section 2 ====
First round
4	(United States) J Canter	6	3	6
(West Germany) C Steeb	3	6	1
(United States) R Nixon	6	0	3
Q	(United States) D Livingston	3	6	6
Q	(Japan) S Tatsuno	1	4
(India) S Vasudevan	6	6
(Finland) O Rahnasto	3	6	3
13	(United States) S Davis	6	2	6
11	(United States) J Sadri	6	6
WC	(United States) J Bailey	3	2
Q	(United States) R Rudeen	4	6	3
(United States) B Pearce	6	3	6
(United States) B Green	4	6	7
(United States) K Flach	6	4	6
(New Zealand) R Simpson	3	1
5	(India) R Krishnan	6	6

Second round
4	(United States) J Canter	7	5	6
Q	(United States) D Livingston	5	7	4
(India) S Vasudevan	3	3
13	(United States) S Davis	6	6
11	(United States) J Sadri	6	6
(United States) B Pearce	3	3
(United States) B Green	4	2
5	(India) R Krishnan	6	6

Third round
4	(United States) J Canter	7	3	6
13	(United States) S Davis	6	6	2
11	(United States) J Sadri	3	4
5	(India) R Krishnan	6	6

Quarterfinals
4	(United States) J Canter	6	3	4
5	(India) R Krishnan	4	6	6

=== Bottom half ===
==== Section 3 ====
First round
6	(Peru) J Yzaga	5	6	6
(United Kingdom) J Bates	7	4	1
Q	(South Africa) C Campbell	4	1
(Denmark) M Tauson	6	6
(Switzerland) S Medem	2	4
WC	(Japan) S Matsuoka	6	6
(New Zealand) B Derlin	0	6
12	(United States) M Davis	6	7
14	(Canada) G Michibata	6	3	4
(United States) M De Palmer	3	6	6
(Canada) B Cowan	6	6	6
(United States) M Bauer	3	7	7
(United States) L Bourne	3	5
(United States) L Stefanki	6	7
Q	(West Germany) C Zipf	3	2
3	(United States) M Anger	6	6

Second round
6	(Peru) J Yzaga	6	7
(Denmark) M Tauson	2	5
WC	(Japan) S Matsuoka	0	3
12	(United States) M Davis	6	6
(United States) M De Palmer	7	6
(United States) M Bauer	6	3
(United States) L Stefanki	7	3	2
3	(United States) M Anger	6	6	6

Third round
6	(Peru) J Yzaga	6	6
12	(United States) M Davis	2	2
(United States) M De Palmer	7	6
3	(United States) M Anger	5	3

Quarterfinals
6	(Peru) J Yzaga	6	6	6
(United States) M De Palmer	7	4	2

==== Section 4 ====
First round
7	(United States) T Witsken	6	6
(Canada) M Laurendeau	2	4
Q	(Sweden) H Fredborg	7	3	2
(West Germany) P Moraing	6	6	6
(United States) B Teacher	5	6	6
(United States) P Chamberlin	7	3	7
WC	(Japan) K Morita	1	1
10	(United States) G Holmes	6	6
16	(United States) D Rostagno	4	6	6
(United States) M Flur	6	4	4
(West Germany) I Werner	6	2	7
(United States) L Shiras	3	6	6
(United States) V Wilder	6	2	1
(Sweden) J Carlsson	4	6	6
(United States) A Agassi	4	2
2	(United States) J Arias	6	6

Second round
7	(United States) T Witsken	3	3
(West Germany) P Moraing	6	6
(United States) P Chamberlin	4	7	7
10	(United States) G Holmes	6	5	6
16	(United States) D Rostagno	6	6	6
(West Germany) I Werner	7	2	3
(Sweden) J Carlsson	2	6	6
2	(United States) J Arias	6	3	1

Third round
(West Germany) P Moraing	4	4
(United States) P Chamberlin	6	6
16	(United States) D Rostagno	6	6
(Sweden) J Carlsson	7	7

Quarterfinals
(United States) P Chamberlin	4	6
(Sweden) J Carlsson	6	7
