= 1988 Virginia Slims of Arizona =

- Date: September 12–18
- Edition: 3rd
- Category: Category 2
- Draw: 32S / 16D
- Prize money: $100,000
- Surface: Hard / outdoor
- Location: Phoenix, Arizona, U.S.
- Venue: The Pointe at South Mountain

Champions

Singles
- (Bulgaria) Manuela Maleeva

Doubles
- (United States) Elise Burgin / (South Africa) Rosalyn Fairbank
← 1987 ·	Virginia Slims of Arizona	· 1989 →

The 1988 Virginia Slims of Arizona was a women's tennis tournament played on outdoor hard courts at The Pointe at South Mountain in Phoenix, Arizona in the United States and was part of the Category 2 tier of the 1988 WTA Tour. It was the third edition of the tournament and was held from September 12 through September 18, 1988. First-seeded Manuela Maleeva won the singles title and earned $17,000 first-prize money.

== Finals ==
=== Singles ===
(Bulgaria) Manuela Maleeva defeated (South Africa) Dianne van Rensburg 6–3, 4–6, 6–2

- It was Maleeva's 2nd title of the year and the 12th of her career.

=== Doubles ===
(United States) Elise Burgin / (South Africa) Rosalyn Fairbank defeated (United States) Beth Herr / (United States) Terry Phelps 6–7^{(6–8)}, 7–6^{(7–3)}, 7–6^{(10–8)}

- It was Burgin's only title of the year and the 9th of her career. It was Fairbank's 2nd title of the year and the 17th of her career.

== See also ==
- 1988 Eagle Classic – men's tournament in Scottsdale
