= 1986 Virginia Slims of Arizona – Singles =

Singles
- 1986 Virginia Slims of Arizona

Final
- Champion: (United States) Beth Herr
- Runner-up: (United States) Ann Henricksson
- Score: 6–0, 3–6, 7–5

Details
- Draw: 32 (4 Q )
- Seeds: 8

Events
Singles	Doubles
Virginia Slims of Arizona	· 1987 →

The 1986 Virginia Slims of Arizona singles was one of the events of the 1986 Virginia Slims of Arizona tennis tournament. It was played between March 23 and March 29, 1986, at the Jordan Tennis and Racquet Center in Phoenix, Arizona in the United States. The draw consisted of 32 players of which 4 were qualifiers and 8 were seeded. Unseeded Beth Herr won the singles title, defeating sixth-seeded Ann Henricksson in the final, 6–0, 3–6, 7–5.

== Seeds ==
1. (United States) Alycia Moulton (second round)
2. (United States) Betsy Nagelsen (third round)
3. (Canada) Helen Kelesi (first round)
4. (United States) Susan Mascarin (second round)
5. (United States) Mareen Louie (semifinals)
6. (United States) Ann Henricksson (final)
7. (Czechoslovakia) Iva Budařová (second round)
8. (United States) Camille Benjamin (quarterfinals)

== Draw ==
=== Key ===
- Q = Qualifier
- WC = Wild card
- LL = Lucky loser
- Alt = Alternate
- SE = Special exempt
- PR = Protected ranking
- ITF = ITF entry
- JE = Junior exempt
- w/o = Walkover
- r = Retired
- d = Defaulted
- SR = Special ranking

=== Finals ===
Semifinals
(United States) Beth Herr	7	6
5	(United States) Mareen Louie	6	1
6	(United States) Ann Henricksson	6	6
(West Germany) Claudia Porwik	2	2

Final
(United States) Beth Herr	6	3	7
6	(United States) Ann Henricksson	0	6	5

=== Top half ===
First round
1	(United States) Alycia Moulton	6	3	6
(Argentina) Mercedes Paz	4	6	7
(United States) Beth Herr	6	6
(United States) Amy Holton	0	1
(Brazil) Neige Dias	6	6
(United States) Linda Gates	3	2
Q	(Switzerland) Csilla Cserepy	1	4
8	(United States) Camille Benjamin	6	6
4	(United States) Susan Mascarin	6	6
(United States) Terry Holladay	3	3
(United States) Hu Na	6	7	6
Q	(West Germany) Gabriela Dinu	7	6	3
(United States) Jenny Klitch	6	5	6
(United States) Cecilia Fernandez	1	7	2
Q	(United States) Cammy MacGregor	0	2
5	(United States) Mareen Louie	6	6

Second round
(Argentina) Mercedes Paz	5	4
(United States) Beth Herr	7	6
(Brazil) Neige Dias	3	1
8	(United States) Camille Benjamin	6	6
4	(United States) Susan Mascarin	6	6	6
(United States) Hu Na	3	7	7
(United States) Jenny Klitch	0	R
5	(United States) Mareen Louie	1	0

Quarterfinals
(United States) Beth Herr	6	6
8	(United States) Camille Benjamin	1	4
(United States) Hu Na	2	7	2
5	(United States) Mareen Louie	6	5	6

Semifinals
(United States) Beth Herr	7	6
5	(United States) Mareen Louie	6	1

=== Bottom half ===
First round
6	(United States) Ann Henricksson	6	6
(United States) V Nelson-Dunbar	3	2
(Greece) A Kanellopoulou	5	2
(United States) Lisa Spain-Short	7	6
(United States) Lea Antonoplis	4	6
(Czechoslovakia) Regina Maršíková	6	7
(South Africa) Jennifer Mundel	3	6	6
3	(Canada) Helen Kelesi	6	3	4
7	(Czechoslovakia) Iva Budařová	6	6
(United States) Ginny Purdy	1	2
(United States) Melissa Gurney	6	6	3
Q	(West Germany) Claudia Porwik	7	1	6
(United States) Tina Mochizuki	6	6
(Brazil) Cláudia Monteiro	0	1
(Japan) Etsuko Inoue	6	5	4
2	(United States) Betsy Nagelsen	1	7	6

Second round
6	(United States) Ann Henricksson	6	6
(United States) Lisa Spain-Short	3	3
(Czechoslovakia) Regina Maršíková	4	4
(South Africa) Jennifer Mundel	6	6
7	(Czechoslovakia) Iva Budařová	6	4	1
(West Germany) Claudia Porwik	3	6	6
(United States) Tina Mochizuki	6	2	6
2	(United States) Betsy Nagelsen	2	6	3

Quarterfinals
6	(United States) Ann Henricksson	2	7	6
(South Africa) Jennifer Mundel	6	6	3
(West Germany) Claudia Porwik	6	6
(United States) Tina Mochizuki	4	2

Semifinals
6	(United States) Ann Henricksson	6	6
(West Germany) Claudia Porwik	2	2
