= 1986 Japan Open Tennis Championships – Men's doubles =

Men's doubles
- 1986 Japan Open Tennis Championships

Final
- Champion: (United States) Matt Anger; (United States) Ken Flach
- Runner-up: (United States) Jimmy Arias; (United States) Greg Holmes
- Score: 6–2, 6–3

Details
- Draw: 32
- Seeds: 8

Events
Singles	men	women
Doubles	men	women
- Japan Open

Scott Davis and David Pate were the defending champions, but lost in the first round to Henry Pfister and John Sadri.

Matt Anger and Ken Flach won the title, defeating Jimmy Arias and Greg Holmes in the final, 6–2, 6–3.

== Seeds ==
1. (United States) Scott Davis / (United States) David Pate (first round)
2. (United States) Mike De Palmer / (United States) Gary Donnelly (first round)
3. (United Kingdom) Jeremy Bates / (New Zealand) Bruce Derlin (second round)
4. (United States) Jon Levine / (Finland) Olli Rahnasto (first round)
5. (United States) Jimmy Arias / (United States) Greg Holmes (final)
6. (United States) Steve Denton / (United States) Bob Green (second round)
7. (United States) Matt Anger / (United States) Ken Flach (champions)
8. (United States) Marty Davis / (New Zealand) Russell Simpson (first round)

== Draw ==
Key

- Q = Qualifier
- WC = Wild card
- LL = Lucky loser
- Alt = Alternate
- ITF = ITF entry
- PR = Protected ranking
- SR = Special ranking
- SE = Special exempt
- JE = Junior exempt
- JR = Junior Accelerator Programme entrant
- CO = College Accelerator Programme entrant
- NG = Next Gen Accelerator Program entrant
- w/o = Walkover
- r = Retired
- d = Defaulted

=== Finals ===
Semifinals
7	(United States) Matt Anger (United States) Ken Flach	6	6
(United States) Brad Pearce (United States) Bud Schultz	2	4
5	(United States) Jimmy Arias (United States) Greg Holmes	6	3	6
(United States) Larry Stefanki (United States) Robert Van't Hof	3	6	3

Final
7	(United States) Matt Anger (United States) Ken Flach	6	6
5	(United States) Jimmy Arias (United States) Greg Holmes	2	3

=== Top half ===
First round
1	(United States) S Davis (United States) D Pate	7	2	3
(United States) H Pfister (United States) J Sadri	6	6	6
(United States) J Grabb (United States) D Rostagno	4	5
(United States) K Richter (United States) R Rudeen	6	7
(West Germany) P Moraing (West Germany) C Zipf	3	2
(United States) J Bailey (Japan) T Yonezawa	6	6
(United States) L Bourne (United States) R Nixon	4	3
7	(United States) M Anger (United States) K Flach	6	6
4	(United States) J Levine (Finland) O Rahnasto	6	6	6
(United States) B Pearce (United States) B Schultz	4	7	7
(Japan) S Matsuoka (United States) B Scanlon	2	7	4
(United States) R Brown (Peru) J Yzaga	6	6	6
(New Zealand) S Guy (India) S Vasudevan	3	4
(Denmark) M Christensen (Denmark) M Tauson	6	6
(South Africa) C Campbell (United States) V Wilder	2	4
6	(United States) S Denton (United States) B Green	6	6

Second round
(United States) H Pfister (United States) J Sadri	6	6
(United States) K Richter (United States) R Rudeen	7	7
(United States) J Bailey (Japan) T Yonezawa	2	5
7	(United States) M Anger (United States) K Flach	6	7
(United States) B Pearce (United States) B Schultz	6	6	6
(United States) R Brown (Peru) J Yzaga	7	3	4
(Denmark) M Christensen (Denmark) M Tauson	6	4	6
6	(United States) S Denton (United States) B Green	4	6	4

Quarterfinals
(United States) K Richter (United States) R Rudeen	3	6
7	(United States) M Anger (United States) K Flach	6	7
(United States) B Pearce (United States) B Schultz	6	6
(Denmark) M Christensen (Denmark) M Tauson	2	1

Semifinals
7	(United States) M Anger (United States) K Flach	6	6
(United States) B Pearce (United States) B Schultz	2	4

=== Bottom half ===
First round
5	(United States) J Arias (United States) G Holmes	7	6
(United States) J Lapidus (United States) L Shiras	5	3
(United States) P Chamberlin (United States) J Pugh	6	6
(United States) D Livingston (Switzerland) S Medem	2	4
(Japan) H Shirato (Japan) E Takeuchi	6	6
(West Germany) D Keretić (West Germany) C Steeb	7	7
(Canada) M Laurendeau (Canada) G Michibata	3	4
3	(United Kingdom) J Bates (New Zealand) B Derlin	6	6
8	(United States) M Davis (New Zealand) R Simpson	2	2
(United States) M Flur (India) R Krishnan	6	6
(United States) K Jones (United States) T Witsken	3	6	6
(United States) J Canter (United States) B Teacher	6	4	3
(United States) L Stefanki (United States) R Van't Hof	7	6	6
(United States) M Bauer (United States) D Dowlen	6	7	3
(Sweden) J Carlsson (West Germany) I Werner	6	3	6
2	(United States) M De Palmer (United States) G Donnelly	4	6	4

Second round
5	(United States) J Arias (United States) G Holmes	6	7
(United States) P Chamberlin (United States) J Pugh	4	6
(West Germany) D Keretić (West Germany) C Steeb	3	7	6
3	(United Kingdom) J Bates (New Zealand) B Derlin	6	6	4
(United States) M Flur (India) R Krishnan	5	4
(United States) K Jones (United States) T Witsken	7	6
(United States) L Stefanki (United States) R Van't Hof	6	6
(Sweden) J Carlsson (West Germany) I Werner	1	3

Quarterfinals
5	(United States) J Arias (United States) G Holmes	6	7	6
(West Germany) D Keretić (West Germany) C Steeb	7	6	1
(United States) K Jones (United States) T Witsken	3	4
(United States) L Stefanki (United States) R Van't Hof	6	6

Semifinals
5	(United States) J Arias (United States) G Holmes	6	3	6
(United States) L Stefanki (United States) R Van't Hof	3	6	3
