= 1985 Japan Open Tennis Championships – Men's doubles =

Men's doubles
- 1985 Japan Open Tennis Championships

Final
- Champions: (United States) Scott Davis (United States) David Pate
- Runners-up: (United States) Sammy Giammalva Jr. (United States) Greg Holmes
- Score: 7–6^{(7–3)}, 6–7^{(6–8)}, 6–3

Details
- Draw: 32
- Seeds: 8

Events
Singles	men	women
Doubles	men	women
- Japan Open

David Dowlen and Nduka Odizor were the defending champions, but both players chose to compete at Sydney during the same week.

Scott Davis and David Pate won the title by defeating Sammy Giammalva Jr. and Greg Holmes 7–6^{(7–3)}, 6–7^{(6–8)}, 6–3 in the final.

== Seeds ==
1. (United States) Scott Davis / (United States) David Pate (champions)
2. (United States) Steve Denton / (United States) Gary Donnelly (quarterfinals)
3. (United States) Andy Kohlberg / (United States) Robert Van't Hof (semifinals)
4. (United States) Chris Dunk / (Canada) Glenn Michibata (second round)
5. (United States) Vitas Gerulaitis / (United States) Vincent Van Patten (second round)
6. (United States) Sammy Giammalva Jr. / (United States) Greg Holmes (final)
7. (New Zealand) Russell Simpson / (United States) Erik Van't Hof (quarterfinals)
8. (Netherlands) Menno Oosting / (Netherlands) Huub van Boeckel (first round)

== Draw ==
Key

- Q = Qualifier
- WC = Wild card
- LL = Lucky loser
- Alt = Alternate
- ITF = ITF entry
- PR = Protected ranking
- SR = Special ranking
- SE = Special exempt
- JE = Junior exempt
- JR = Junior Accelerator Programme entrant
- CO = College Accelerator Programme entrant
- NG = Next Gen Accelerator Program entrant
- w/o = Walkover
- r = Retired
- d = Defaulted

=== Finals ===
Semifinals
1	(United States) Scott Davis (United States) David Pate	6	6
3	(United States) Andy Kohlberg (United States) Robert Van't Hof	4	3
(United States) Matt Anger (United States) Jimmy Arias	6	6	6
6	(United States) Sammy Giammalva Jr. (United States) Greg Holmes	7	4	7

Final
1	(United States) Scott Davis (United States) David Pate	7^{7}	6^{6}	6
6	(United States) Sammy Giammalva Jr. (United States) Greg Holmes	6^{3}	7^{8}	3

=== Top half ===
First round
1	(United States) S Davis (United States) D Pate	6	6
(Japan) Noriyuki Washida (Japan) Nobuo Yoshida	3	0
(India) S Menon (United States) C Strode	7	6
(Japan) S Nishio (Japan) Kenzo Ukon	6	2
(Japan) T Fukui (Japan) Nobuya Tamura	3	4
(New Zealand) S Guy (India) S Vasudevan	6	6
(United States) Lee Brandenburg (United States) B Dickinson	4	3
7	(New Zealand) R Simpson (United States) E Van't Hof	6	6
3	(United States) A Kohlberg (United States) R Van't Hof	6	7
(United States) T Erck (Switzerland) D Utzinger	3	6
(Egypt) A El-Mehelmy (United States) M Wooldridge	6	3
(United States) J Bailey (Japan) T Yonezawa	7	6
(United States) G Lemon (West Germany) H Rittersbacher	2	4
(United States) R Brown (Sweden) J Carlsson	6	6
(South Africa) C Campbell (Canada) H McDadi	2	4
5	(United States) V Gerulaitis (United States) V Van Patten	6	6

Second round
1	(United States) S Davis (United States) D Pate	6	6	6
(India) S Menon (United States) C Strode	7	3	4
(New Zealand) S Guy (India) S Vasudevan	4	2
7	(New Zealand) R Simpson (United States) E Van't Hof	6	6
3	(United States) A Kohlberg (United States) R Van't Hof	6	6
(United States) J Bailey (Japan) T Yonezawa	2	2
(United States) R Brown (Sweden) J Carlsson	6	7
5	(United States) V Gerulaitis (United States) V Van Patten	2	6

Quarterfinals
1	(United States) S Davis (United States) D Pate	6	6
7	(New Zealand) R Simpson (United States) E Van't Hof	4	2
3	(United States) A Kohlberg (United States) R Van't Hof	6	6
(United States) R Brown (Sweden) J Carlsson	3	4

Semifinals
1	(United States) S Davis (United States) D Pate	6	6
3	(United States) A Kohlberg (United States) R Van't Hof	4	3

=== Bottom half ===
First round
8	(Netherlands) M Oosting (Netherlands) H van Boeckel	6	4	3
(United States) M Anger (United States) J Arias	3	6	6
(United States) K Richter (United States) R Rudeen	6	6
(Japan) H Shirato (Japan) E Takeuchi	4	4
(United States) S McCain (United States) R Nixon	6	6
(Japan) Ryō Kubodera (Japan) Atsushi Noguchi	0	4
(Japan) S Matsuoka (Japan) R Tsujino	3	4
4	(United States) C Dunk (Canada) G Michibata	6	6
6	(United States) S Giammalva Jr. (United States) G Holmes	6	6
(United States) C Stansbury (United States) P Wright	3	2
(United States) Henry Somerville (United States) Jim Somerville	6	6
(Japan) Takayoshi Shibuya (Japan) Minoru Ueda	4	3
(Japan) H Nakano (Japan) Kiyotaka Tachibana	4	4
(United States) J Canter (United States) D Saltz	6	6
(Japan) Shōichi Horiuchi (Japan) Masayoshi Takeyari	2	0
2	(United States) S Denton (United States) G Donnelly	6	6

Second round
(United States) M Anger (United States) J Arias	6	6
(United States) K Richter (United States) R Rudeen	4	4
(United States) S McCain (United States) R Nixon	3	7	7
4	(United States) C Dunk (Canada) G Michibata	6	6	6
6	(United States) S Giammalva Jr. (United States) G Holmes	6	6
(United States) Henry Somerville (United States) Jim Somerville	2	4
(United States) J Canter (United States) D Saltz	0	0
2	(United States) S Denton (United States) G Donnelly	6	6

Quarterfinals
(United States) M Anger (United States) J Arias	7	6
(United States) S McCain (United States) R Nixon	6	3
6	(United States) S Giammalva Jr. (United States) G Holmes	6	7
2	(United States) S Denton (United States) G Donnelly	4	5

Semifinals
(United States) M Anger (United States) J Arias	6	6	6
6	(United States) S Giammalva Jr. (United States) G Holmes	7	4	7
