= 1985 Japan Open Tennis Championships – Men's singles =

Men's singles
- 1985 Japan Open Tennis Championships

Final
- Champion: (United States) Scott Davis
- Runner-up: (United States) Jimmy Arias
- Score: 6–1, 7–6^{(7–3)}

Details
- Draw: 64 (5WC/8Q/2LL)
- Seeds: 16

Events
Singles	men	women
Doubles	men	women
- Japan Open

David Pate was the defending champion, but lost in the third round to Jonathan Canter.

Scott Davis won the title by defeating Jimmy Arias 6–1, 7–6^{(7–3)} in the final.

== Seeds ==
1. (United States) Tim Mayotte (third round)
2. (United States) Scott Davis (champion)
3. (United States) David Pate (third round)
4. (United States) Jimmy Arias (final)
5. (United States) Greg Holmes (quarterfinals)
6. (United States) Sammy Giammalva Jr. (quarterfinals)
7. (United States) Vitas Gerulaitis (first round)
8. (United States) Robert Seguso (third round)
9. (United States) Ken Flach (third round)
10. (Netherlands) Huub van Boeckel (first round)
11. (United States) Matt Anger (quarterfinals)
12. (United States) Jonathan Canter (quarterfinals)
13. (United States) Vincent Van Patten (third round)
14. (Canada) Glenn Michibata (semifinals)
15. (New Zealand) Russell Simpson (third round)
16. (Netherlands) Menno Oosting (second round)

== Draw ==
Key

- Q = Qualifier
- WC = Wild card
- LL = Lucky loser
- Alt = Alternate
- ITF = ITF entry
- PR = Protected ranking
- SR = Special ranking
- SE = Special exempt
- JE = Junior exempt
- JR = Junior Accelerator Programme entrant
- CO = College Accelerator Programme entrant
- NG = Next Gen Accelerator Program entrant
- w/o = Walkover
- r = Retired
- d = Defaulted

=== Finals ===
Quarterfinals
14	(Canada) Glenn Michibata	6	6
5	(United States) Greg Holmes	4	4
4	(United States) Jimmy Arias	6	6
11	(United States) Matt Anger	3	3
(Sweden) Johan Carlsson	1	7	6
12	(United States) Jonathan Canter	6	6	1
6	(United States) Sammy Giammalva Jr.	4	2
2	(United States) Scott Davis	6	6

Semifinals
14	(Canada) Glenn Michibata	7	3	4
4	(United States) Jimmy Arias	5	6	6
(Sweden) Johan Carlsson	4	1
2	(United States) Scott Davis	6	6

Final
4	(United States) Jimmy Arias	1	6^{3}
2	(United States) Scott Davis	6	7^{7}

=== Top half ===
==== Section 1 ====
First round
1	(United States) T Mayotte	6	6
(India) S Menon	1	3
Q	(United States) C Stansbury	6	6
(Japan) S Shiraishi	2	0
Q	(Japan) Shoichi Tatsuno	4	1
(United States) B Dickinson	6	6
(New Zealand) S Guy	2	4
14	(Canada) G Michibata	6	6
10	(Netherlands) H van Boeckel	6	4
(United States) C Dunk	7	6
(Japan) Minoru Ueda	7	3	3
(South Africa) C Campbell	5	6	6
(United States) G Lemon	6	6
Q	(Japan) S Matsuoka	3	4
(United States) S Denton	7	6	5
5	(United States) G Holmes	5	7	7

Second round
1	(United States) T Mayotte	6	6	6
Q	(United States) C Stansbury	7	0	1
(United States) B Dickinson	1	3
14	(Canada) G Michibata	6	6
(United States) C Dunk	6	2	6
(South Africa) C Campbell	4	6	3
(United States) G Lemon	2	1
5	(United States) G Holmes	6	6

Third round
1	(United States) T Mayotte	6	6	4
14	(Canada) G Michibata	7	4	6
(United States) C Dunk	2	4
5	(United States) G Holmes	6	6

Quarterfinals
14	(Canada) G Michibata	6	6
5	(United States) G Holmes	4	4

==== Section 2 ====
First round
4	(United States) J Arias	6	6
(United States) R Brown	2	4
(United States) R Van't Hof	6	3	6
(United States) J Manset	4	6	7
WC	(Japan) T Tsuchihashi	6	1	6
(Japan) H Shirato	2	6	3
(Japan) E Takeuchi	2	4
15	(New Zealand) R Simpson	6	6
11	(United States) M Anger	6	6
(Nigeria) T Mmoh	2	0
(United States) M Wooldridge	4	4
(Japan) T Fukui	6	6
(France) L Courteau	6	6
LL	(Japan) Kenzo Ukon	2	1
Q	(Japan) T Sakai	2	2
8	(United States) R Seguso	6	6

Second round
4	(United States) J Arias	7	6
(United States) J Manset	6	1
WC	(Japan) T Tsuchihashi	2	3
15	(New Zealand) R Simpson	6	6
11	(United States) M Anger	6	7
(Japan) T Fukui	3	5
(France) L Courteau	2	1
8	(United States) R Seguso	6	6

Third round
4	(United States) J Arias	3	7	6
15	(New Zealand) R Simpson	6	6	3
11	(United States) M Anger	6	6
8	(United States) R Seguso	4	4

Quarterfinals
4	(United States) J Arias	6	6
11	(United States) M Anger	3	3

=== Bottom half ===
==== Section 3 ====
First round
7/WC	(United States) V Gerulaitis	4	1
(Sweden) J Carlsson	6	6
(Switzerland) D Utzinger	7	3	2
(West Germany) H Rittersbacher	6	6	6
(India) S Vasudevan	6	6
WC	(Japan) Kazuya Morita	1	0
(United States) J Bailey	1	6	4
9	(United States) K Flach	6	3	6
12	(United States) J Canter	6	6
Q	(Japan) Shōichi Horiuchi	3	0
(United States) K Richter	3	7	6
(Canada) H McDadi	6	5	3
(United States) S McCain	6	6
LL	(Japan) Kiyotaka Tachibana	2	4
(United States) A Kohlberg	6	2	3
3	(United States) D Pate	4	6	6

Second round
(Sweden) J Carlsson	6	6
(West Germany) H Rittersbacher	1	4
(India) S Vasudevan	6	4
9	(United States) K Flach	7	6
12	(United States) J Canter	6	6
(United States) K Richter	1	4
(United States) S McCain	3	7	4
3	(United States) D Pate	6	5	6

Third round
(Sweden) J Carlsson	6	6
9	(United States) K Flach	2	1
12	(United States) J Canter	7	6
3	(United States) D Pate	5	2

Quarterfinals
(Sweden) J Carlsson	1	7	6
12	(United States) J Canter	6	6	1

==== Section 4 ====
First round
6	(United States) S Giammalva Jr.	7	6
(United States) E Van't Hof	5	3
(United States) R Nixon	5	2
(United States) G Donnelly	7	6
(United States) R Rudeen	6	6
(United States) D Saltz	3	0
WC	(Japan) T Yonezawa	3	7	4
16	(Netherlands) M Oosting	6	5	6
13	(United States) V Van Patten	6	6
WC	(Japan) H Nakano	2	3
Q	(Japan) Takeshi Murakami	0	2
(Egypt) A El-Mehelmy	6	6
Q	(Japan) S Nishio	4	4
Q	(Japan) Hajime Nihonmatsu	6	6
(United States) C Strode	3	2
2	(United States) S Davis	6	6

Second round
6	(United States) S Giammalva Jr.	7	6
(United States) G Donnelly	6	3
(United States) R Rudeen	6	6	6
16	(Netherlands) M Oosting	7	2	4
13	(United States) V Van Patten	7	7
(Egypt) A El-Mehelmy	6	5
Q	(Japan) Hajime Nihonmatsu	0	0
2	(United States) S Davis	6	6

Third round
6	(United States) S Giammalva Jr.	6	7
(United States) R Rudeen	4	6
13	(United States) V Van Patten	4	4
2	(United States) S Davis	6	6

Quarterfinals
6	(United States) S Giammalva Jr.	4	2
2	(United States) S Davis	6	6
