= 1987 Virginia Slims of Arizona – Doubles =

Doubles
- 1987 Virginia Slims of Arizona

Final
- Champions: (United States) Penny Barg (United States) Beth Herr
- Runners-up: (United States) Mary Lou Piatek (United States) Anne White
- Score: 2–6, 6–2, 7–6^{(7–2)}

Details
- Draw: 24
- Seeds: 8

Events
Singles	Doubles
- Virginia Slims of Arizona

Susan Mascarin and Betsy Nagelsen were the defending champions, but none competed this year.

Penny Barg and Beth Herr won the title by defeating Mary Lou Piatek and Anne White 2–6, 6–2, 7–6^{(7–2)} in the final.

== Seeds ==
All seeds received a bye to the second round.

1. (United States) Mary Lou Piatek / (United States) Anne White (final)
2. (United States) Sandy Collins / (United States) Sharon Walsh-Pete (second round)
3. (United States) Candy Reynolds / (France) Catherine Suire (second round)
4. (United States) Ann Henricksson / (Netherlands) Marcella Mesker (second round)
5. (United States) Penny Barg / (United States) Beth Herr (champions)
6. (United States) Lea Antonoplis / (United States) Paula Smith (second round)
7. (Switzerland) Christiane Jolissaint / (United States) Molly Van Nostrand (semifinals)
8. (United States) Anna-Maria Fernandez / (New Zealand) Julie Richardson (quarterfinals)

== Draw ==
Key

- Q = Qualifier
- WC = Wild card
- LL = Lucky loser
- Alt = Alternate
- ITF = ITF entry
- PR = Protected ranking
- SR = Special ranking
- SE = Special exempt
- JE = Junior exempt
- JR = Junior Accelerator Programme entrant
- CO = College Accelerator Programme entrant
- NG = Next Gen Accelerator Program entrant
- w/o = Walkover
- r = Retired
- d = Defaulted

=== Finals ===
Semifinals
1	(United States) Mary Lou Piatek (United States) Anne White	6	6
7	(Switzerland) Christiane Jolissaint (United States) Molly Van Nostrand	3	2
(United States) Peanut Louie Harper (United States) Heather Ludloff	7	3	6
5	(United States) Penny Barg (United States) Beth Herr	5	6	7

Final
1	(United States) Mary Lou Piatek (United States) Anne White	6	2	6^{2}
5	(United States) Penny Barg (United States) Beth Herr	2	6	7^{7}

=== Top half ===
First round
(Brazil) N Dias (Brazil) P Medrado	6	0	6
(Australia) D Balestrat (United States) B Gadusek	4	6	3
(United States) C Fernandez (Mexico) H Steden	1	3
(Australia) J Byrne (Brazil) C Monteiro	6	6
(United States) L Bonder (West Germany) I Cueto	6	1
(Sweden) C Karlsson (Czechoslovakia) J Novotná	7	6
(Peru) L Gildemeister (West Germany) W Probst	6	6
(Argentina) P Tarabini (Argentina) A Villagrán	1	1

Second round
1	(United States) ML Piatek (United States) A White	7	6
(Brazil) N Dias (Brazil) P Medrado	6	2
(Australia) J Byrne (Brazil) C Monteiro	7	5	6
8	(United States) L Antonoplis (United States) P Smith	5	7	1
4	(United States) A Henricksson (Netherlands) M Mesker	3	6	1
(Sweden) C Karlsson (Czechoslovakia) J Novotná	6	3	6
(Peru) L Gildemeister (West Germany) W Probst	5	4
7	(Switzerland) C Jolissaint (United States) M Van Nostrand	7	6

Quarterfinals
1	(United States) ML Piatek (United States) A White	3	6	6
(Australia) J Byrne (Brazil) C Monteiro	6	2	3
(Sweden) C Karlsson (Czechoslovakia) J Novotná	6	5
7	(Switzerland) C Jolissaint (United States) M Van Nostrand	7	7

Semifinals
1	(United States) ML Piatek (United States) A White	6	6
7	(Switzerland) C Jolissaint (United States) M Van Nostrand	3	2

=== Bottom half ===
First round
(United Kingdom) A Croft (United States) B Gerken	6	1
(West Germany) A Betzner (West Germany) C Porwik	7	6
(United States) P Louie Harper (United States) H Ludloff	7	6
(Sweden) M Lindström (Netherlands) H ter Riet	5	3
(United States) T Mochizuki (United States) V Nelson-Dunbar	6	1	5
(United States) K Keil (Peru) P Vásquez	4	6	7
(United States) N Sodupe (United States) D Spence	5	2
(Hong Kong) P Hy (Australia) S Leo	7	6

Second round
8	(United States) AM Fernandez (New Zealand) J Richardson	6	6
(West Germany) A Betzner (West Germany) C Porwik	4	3
(United States) P Louie Harper (United States) H Ludloff	7	6
3	(United States) C Reynolds (France) C Suire	6	3
5	(United States) P Barg (United States) B Herr	7	6
(United States) K Keil (Peru) P Vásquez	5	2
(Hong Kong) P Hy (Australia) S Leo	6	6
2	(United States) S Collins (United States) S Walsh-Pete	4	4

Quarterfinals
8	(United States) AM Fernandez (New Zealand) J Richardson	3	3
(United States) P Louie Harper (United States) H Ludloff	6	6
5	(United States) P Barg (United States) B Herr	6	4	6
(Hong Kong) P Hy (Australia) S Leo	3	6	2

Semifinals
(United States) P Louie Harper (United States) H Ludloff	7	3	6
5	(United States) P Barg (United States) B Herr	5	6	7
