= 1984 Japan Open Tennis Championships – Men's singles =

Men's singles
- 1984 Japan Open Tennis Championships

Final
- Champion: (United States) David Pate
- Runner-up: (United States) Terry Moor
- Score: 6–3, 7–5

Details
- Draw: 64 (7Q)
- Seeds: 16

Events
Singles	men	women
Doubles	men	women
- Japan Open

Eliot Teltscher was the defending champion, but did not participate this year.

David Pate won the title, defeating Terry Moor in the final, 6–3, 7–5.

== Seeds ==
1. (Ecuador) Andres Gomez (second round)
2. (United States) Brad Gilbert (semifinals)
3. (India) Ramesh Krishnan (quarterfinals)
4. (United States) Terry Moor (final)
5. (United States) Tom Gullikson (second round)
6. (United States) Tim Gullikson (first round)
7. (United States) Bob Green (third round)
8. (United States) Marty Davis (third round)
9. (United States) Mark Dickson (first round)
10. (Nigeria) Nduka Odizor (first round)
11. (United States) David Pate (champion)
12. (United States) Sammy Giammalva Jr. (third round)
13. (United States) Rodney Harmon (first round)
14. (United States) Steve Meister (second round)
15. (United States) Jay Lapidus (semifinals)
16. ~~Unknown (withdrew)~~

== Draw ==
Key

- Q = Qualifier
- WC = Wild card
- LL = Lucky loser
- Alt = Alternate
- ITF = ITF entry
- PR = Protected ranking
- SR = Special ranking
- SE = Special exempt
- JE = Junior exempt
- JR = Junior Accelerator Programme entrant
- CO = College Accelerator Programme entrant
- NG = Next Gen Accelerator Program entrant
- w/o = Walkover
- r = Retired
- d = Defaulted

=== Finals ===
Quarterfinals
15	(United States) Jay Lapidus	6	6
(New Zealand) Bruce Derlin	2	4
4	(United States) Terry Moor	6	7
(United States) Larry Stefanki	3	6
11	(United States) David Pate	6	7
3	(India) Ramesh Krishnan	3	6
(United States) Drew Gitlin	3	1
2	(United States) Brad Gilbert	6	6

Semifinals
15	(United States) Jay Lapidus	3	6	5
4	(United States) Terry Moor	6	3	7
11	(United States) David Pate	6	7
2	(United States) Brad Gilbert	3	5

Final
4	(United States) Terry Moor	3	5
11	(United States) David Pate	6	7

=== Top half ===
==== Section 1 ====
First round
1	(Ecuador) A Gómez	6	6
(United States) M Anger	2	2
(United States) J Mattke	6	6
(United States) M Wooldridge	3	3
(Canada) G Michibata	5	3
(United States) B Manson	7	6
(Japan) S Sakamoto	7	2	3
15	(United States) J Lapidus	6	6	6
13	(United States) R Harmon	5	1
(United States) T Nelson	7	6
(Japan) S Horiuchi	1	2
(New Zealand) B Derlin	6	6
(United States) H Sands	6	6
(Japan) I Nakanishi	3	1
(United States) D Dowlen	5	3
8	(United States) M Davis	7	6

Second round
1	(Ecuador) A Gómez	4	6	6
(United States) J Mattke	6	3	7
(United States) B Manson	4	2
15	(United States) J Lapidus	6	6
(United States) T Nelson	6	6	4
(New Zealand) B Derlin	0	7	6
(United States) H Sands	3	2
8	(United States) M Davis	6	6

Third round
(United States) J Mattke	2	2
15	(United States) J Lapidus	6	6
(New Zealand) B Derlin	6	6
8	(United States) M Davis	2	2

Quarterfinals
15	(United States) J Lapidus	6	6
(New Zealand) B Derlin	2	4

==== Section 2 ====
First round
4	(United States) T Moor	6	6
(United States) K Richter	1	4
(United States) K Belcher	6	7
(Japan) T Kuramitsu	2	6
(United States) J Gurfein	6	5	6
(United States) M Mitchell	2	7	7
(United States) V Winitsky	6	3
12	(United States) S Giammalva Jr.	7	6
10	(Nigeria) N Odizor	6	6	3
(South Africa) C Campbell	4	7	6
Q	(United States) C Dunk	6	6
(United States) J Bailey	2	4
(United States) L Stefanki	6	6
Q	(Japan) E Takeuchi	2	3
(United States) E Korita	6	3	6
6	(United States) T Gullikson	3	6	3

Second round
4	(United States) T Moor	6	6
(United States) K Belcher	3	4
(United States) M Mitchell	6	3	5
12	(United States) S Giammalva Jr.	4	6	7
(South Africa) C Campbell	6	7
Q	(United States) C Dunk	3	5
(United States) L Stefanki	7	6
(United States) E Korita	6	1

Third round
4	(United States) T Moor	7	6
12	(United States) S Giammalva Jr.	6	4
(South Africa) C Campbell	6	6	4
(United States) L Stefanki	4	7	6

Quarterfinals
4	(United States) T Moor	6	7
(United States) L Stefanki	3	6

=== Bottom half ===
==== Section 3 ====
First round
5	(United States) T Gullikson	6	6
(United States) R Seguso	4	4
Q	(Japan) T Shibuya	2	2
(United States) H Pfister	6	6
(Japan) T Fukui	3	0
Q	(United States) L Duncan	6	6
(Japan) S Nishio	2	2
11	(United States) D Pate	6	6
9	(United States) M Dickson	7	5	4
(Socialist Federal Republic of Yugoslavia) S Živojinović	5	7	6
(United States) M Fedderly	4	1
(Paraguay) F González	6	6
(United States) K Flach	6	6
Q	(Japan) K Tachibana	4	2
(Japan) S Shiraishi	3	3
3	(India) R Krishnan	6	6

Second round
5	(United States) T Gullikson	5	3
(United States) H Pfister	7	6
Q	(United States) L Duncan	2	4
11	(United States) D Pate	6	6
(Socialist Federal Republic of Yugoslavia) S Živojinović	6	6
(Paraguay) F González	4	4
(United States) K Flach	0	1
3	(India) R Krishnan	6	6

Third round
(United States) H Pfister	5	2
11	(United States) D Pate	7	6
(Socialist Federal Republic of Yugoslavia) S Živojinović	4	1
3	(India) R Krishnan	6	6

Quarterfinals
11	(United States) D Pate	6	7
3	(India) R Krishnan	3	6

==== Section 4 ====
First round
7	(United States) B Green	6	6
Q	(China) S Liu	3	1
Q	(United States) E Van't Hof	6	7
(Netherlands) H Van Boeckel	4	5
(United States) D Gitlin	7	6
(United States) T Giammalva	6	4
(Japan) M Ueda	6	6
(Japan) N Uemura	2	2
14	(United States) S Meister	6	6
(Japan) K Maruyama	3	2
(United States) S McCain	6	6
(Japan) K Ukon	2	4
(United States) T Cain	7	6
(United States) P DuPré	6	2
(United States) R Van't Hof	1	3
2	(United States) B Gilbert	6	6

Second round
7	(United States) B Green	6	6
Q	(United States) E Van't Hof	3	2
(United States) D Gitlin	6	6
(Japan) M Ueda	1	4
14	(United States) S Meister	2	2
(United States) S McCain	6	6
(United States) T Cain	2	4
2	(United States) B Gilbert	6	6

Third round
7	(United States) B Green	5	2
(United States) D Gitlin	7	6
(United States) S McCain	3	3
2	(United States) B Gilbert	6	6

Quarterfinals
(United States) D Gitlin	3	1
2	(United States) B Gilbert	6	6
