= 1986 WCT Scottsdale Open – Doubles =

Tennis tournament

Doubles
- 1986 WCT Scottsdale Open

Final
- Champions: (Mexico) Leonardo Lavalle (United States) Mike Leach
- Runners-up: (United States) Scott Davis (United States) David Pate
- Score: 7–6, 6–4

Details
- Draw: 16
- Seeds: 4

Events
Singles	Doubles
- WCT Scottsdale Open

This was the first edition of the event.

Leonardo Lavalle and Mike Leach won the title, defeating Scott Davis and David Pate 7–6, 6–4 in the final.

== Seeds ==
1. (United States) Paul Annacone / (South Africa) Christo van Rensburg (semifinals)
2. (United States) Peter Fleming / (United States) John McEnroe (semifinals)
3. (United States) Scott Davis / (United States) David Pate (final)
4. (United States) Sherwood Stewart / (Australia) Kim Warwick (quarterfinals)

== Draw ==
Key

- Q = Qualifier
- WC = Wild card
- LL = Lucky loser
- Alt = Alternate
- ITF = ITF entry
- PR = Protected ranking
- SR = Special ranking
- SE = Special exempt
- JE = Junior exempt
- JR = Junior Accelerator Programme entrant
- CO = College Accelerator Programme entrant
- NG = Next Gen Accelerator Program entrant
- w/o = Walkover
- r = Retired
- d = Defaulted

=== Draw ===
First round
1	(United States) P Annacone (South Africa) C van Rensburg	6	6
(United States) D Cassidy (United States) M Purcell	3	2
(United States) G Layendecker (Canada) G Michibata	6	6
(United States) K Richter (United States) R Rudeen	1	2
3	(United States) S Davis (United States) D Pate	6	7
(United States) B Schultz (United States) T Witsken	4	6
(United States) D Goldie (United States) M Robertson	3	2
(United States) G Donnelly (United States) B Walts	6	6
(Mexico) L Lavalle (United States) M Leach	6	3	6
(United States) S Giammalva Jr. (Nigeria) N Odizor	3	6	3
(United States) M Anger (New Zealand) R Simpson	1	4
4	(United States) S Stewart (Australia) K Warwick	6	6
(United States) J Canter (United States) B Willenborg	6	1	6
(United States) J Arias (United States) R Nixon	3	6	2
(United States) K Curren (United States) M Mitchell	2	3
2	(United States) P Fleming (United States) J McEnroe	6	6

Quarterfinals
1	(United States) P Annacone (South Africa) C van Rensburg	6	6
(United States) G Layendecker (Canada) G Michibata	4	4
3	(United States) S Davis (United States) D Pate	6	4	7
(United States) G Donnelly (United States) B Walts	3	6	6
(Mexico) L Lavalle (United States) M Leach	6	6
4	(United States) S Stewart (Australia) K Warwick	4	2
(United States) J Canter (United States) B Willenborg	2	5
2	(United States) P Fleming (United States) J McEnroe	6	7

Semifinals
1	(United States) P Annacone (South Africa) C van Rensburg	3	6	6
3	(United States) S Davis (United States) D Pate	6	3	7
(Mexico) L Lavalle (United States) M Leach	4	7	7
2	(United States) P Fleming (United States) J McEnroe	6	6	6

Final
3	(United States) S Davis (United States) D Pate	6	4
(Mexico) L Lavalle (United States) M Leach	7	6
