= 1984 Japan Open Tennis Championships – Men's doubles =

Men's doubles
- 1984 Japan Open Tennis Championships

Final
- Champion: (United States) David Dowlen; (Nigeria) Nduka Odizor
- Runner-up: (United States) Mark Dickson; (United States) Steve Meister
- Score: 6–7, 6–4, 6–3

Details
- Draw: 32
- Seeds: 8

Events
Singles	men	women
Doubles	men	women
- Japan Open

Sammy Giammalva Jr. and Steve Meister were the defending champions, but chose to compete with different partners. Giammalva teamed up with Tony Giammalva and lost in the first round to Joel Bailey and Hitoshi Shirato, while Meister teamed up with Mark Dickson and lost in the final.

David Dowlen and Nduka Odizor won the title, defeating Dickson and Meister in the final, 6–7, 6–4, 6–3.

== Seeds ==
1. (United States) Ken Flach / (United States) Robert Seguso (second round)
2. (United States) Tim Gullikson / (United States) Tom Gullikson (semifinals)
3. (United States) David Dowlen / (Nigeria) Nduka Odizor (champions)
4. (United States) Marty Davis / (United States) Chris Dunk (first round)
5. (United States) Mark Dickson / (United States) Steve Meister (final)
6. (United States) Tony Giammalva / (United States) Sammy Giammalva Jr. (first round)
7. (United States) Larry Stefanki / (United States) Robert Van't Hof (quarterfinals)
8. (United States) Bruce Manson / (United States) David Pate (second round)

== Draw ==
Key

- Q = Qualifier
- WC = Wild card
- LL = Lucky loser
- Alt = Alternate
- ITF = ITF entry
- PR = Protected ranking
- SR = Special ranking
- SE = Special exempt
- JE = Junior exempt
- JR = Junior Accelerator Programme entrant
- CO = College Accelerator Programme entrant
- NG = Next Gen Accelerator Program entrant
- w/o = Walkover
- r = Retired
- d = Defaulted

=== Finals ===
Semifinals
(United States) Drew Gitlin (United States) Henry Pfister	5	4
3	(United States) David Dowlen (Nigeria) Nduka Odizor	7	6
5	(United States) Mark Dickson (United States) Steve Meister	7	7
2	(United States) Tim Gullikson (United States) Tom Gullikson	6	5

Final
3	(United States) David Dowlen (Nigeria) Nduka Odizor	6	6	6
5	(United States) Mark Dickson (United States) Steve Meister	7	4	3

=== Top half ===
First round
1	(United States) K Flach (United States) R Seguso	6	6
(Japan) T Fujii (Japan) H Nihonmatsu	3	2
(New Zealand) B Derlin (Netherlands) H Van Boeckel	3	4
(United States) D Gitlin (United States) H Pfister	6	6
(United States) J Lapidus (United States) V Winitsky	6	3	7
(Japan) I Nakanishi (Japan) K Ukon	1	6	6
(United States) J Bailey (Japan) H Shirato	6	2	6
6	(United States) T Giammalva (United States) S Giammalva Jr.	3	6	4
3	(United States) D Dowlen (Nigeria) N Odizor	7	6	7
(United States) S McCain (United States) T Moor	6	7	6
(China) S Liu (China) K Ma	6	6
(Japan) R Kubodera (Japan) A Noguchi	2	4
(United States) H Sands (United States) E Van't Hof	4	6	6
(United States) J Mattke (United States) M Wooldridge	6	3	2
(Japan) T Shibuya (Japan) M Ueda	6	4
7	(United States) L Stefanki (United States) R Van't Hof	7	6

Second round
1	(United States) K Flach (United States) R Seguso	6	2
(United States) D Gitlin (United States) H Pfister	7	6
(United States) J Lapidus (United States) V Winitsky	6	6
(United States) J Bailey (Japan) H Shirato	3	2
3	(United States) D Dowlen (Nigeria) N Odizor	7	6
(China) S Liu (China) K Ma	6	3
(United States) H Sands (United States) E Van't Hof	3	4
7	(United States) L Stefanki (United States) R Van't Hof	6	6

Quarterfinals
(United States) D Gitlin (United States) H Pfister	6	7
(United States) J Lapidus (United States) V Winitsky	1	6
3	(United States) D Dowlen (Nigeria) N Odizor	6	6
7	(United States) L Stefanki (United States) R Van't Hof	2	4

Semifinals
(United States) D Gitlin (United States) H Pfister	5	4
3	(United States) D Dowlen (Nigeria) N Odizor	7	6

=== Bottom half ===
First round
5	(United States) M Dickson (United States) S Meister	7	6
(United States) M Fedderly (United States) K Richter	6	4
(United States) B Green (United States) R Harmon	6	6
(South Africa) C Campbell (United States) L Duncan	3	4
(Japan) S Nishio (Japan) S Sakamoto	3	3
(United States) M Anger (United States) J Gurfein	6	6
(United States) B Gilbert (Canada) G Michibata	4	6	6
4	(United States) M Davis (United States) C Dunk	6	3	4
8	(United States) B Manson (United States) D Pate	6	6
(United States) T Cain (United States) E Korita	3	4
(United States) P Dupre (Socialist Federal Republic of Yugoslavia) S Živojinović	5	6	4
(United States) K Belcher (India) R Krishnan	7	2	6
(Japan) N Washida (Japan) N Yoshida	1	4
(Japan) T Fukui (Japan) E Takeuchi	6	6
(Japan) H Nakano (Japan) K Tachibana	3	4
2	(United States) T Gullikson (United States) T Gullikson	6	6

Second round
5	(United States) M Dickson (United States) S Meister	7	6	7
(United States) B Green (United States) R Harmon	6	7	6
(United States) M Anger (United States) J Gurfein	2	6	5
(United States) B Gilbert (Canada) G Michibata	6	4	7
8	(United States) B Manson (United States) D Pate	6	4
(United States) K Belcher (India) R Krishnan	7	6
(Japan) T Fukui (Japan) E Takeuchi	5	2
2	(United States) T Gullikson (United States) T Gullikson	7	6

Quarterfinals
5	(United States) M Dickson (United States) S Meister	6	6
(United States) B Gilbert (Canada) G Michibata	0	3
(United States) K Belcher (India) R Krishnan	3	6
2	(United States) T Gullikson (United States) T Gullikson	6	7

Semifinals
5	(United States) M Dickson (United States) S Meister	7	7
2	(United States) T Gullikson (United States) T Gullikson	6	5
