= 1986 WCT Scottsdale Open =

- Date: October 6–13
- Edition: 1st
- Category: Grand Prix (WCT)
- Draw: 32S / 16D
- Prize money: $220,000
- Surface: Hard / outdoor
- Location: Scottsdale, Arizona, U.S.

Champions

Singles
- (United States) John McEnroe

Doubles
- (Mexico) Leonardo Lavalle / (United States) Mike Leach
WCT Scottsdale Open	· 1987 →

The 1986 WCT Scottsdale Open was a men's WCT and Nabisco Grand Prix tennis tournament played on outdoor hard courts in Scottsdale, Arizona in the United States. It was the inaugural edition of the tournament and was held from October 6 through October 13, 1986. First-seeded John McEnroe won the singles title.

== Finals ==
=== Singles ===
(United States) John McEnroe defeated (United States) Kevin Curren 6–3, 3–6, 6–2

- It was McEnroe's 3rd singles title of the year and the 70th of his career.

=== Doubles ===
(Mexico) Leonardo Lavalle / (United States) Mike Leach defeated (United States) Scott Davis / (United States) David Pate 7–6, 6–4

- It was Lavalle's only title of the year and the 1st of his career. It was Leach's 3rd title of the year and the 3rd of his career.

== See also ==
- 1986 Virginia Slims of Arizona – women's tournament in Phoenix
