= Susan Keane =

Susan Keane may refer to:

- Susan Mascarin Keane, American tennis player
- Susan Keane, character in Suddenly Susan
