= Allyson Ingram =

American tennis player (born 1963)

- Full name: Allyson Ingram Walts
- Country (sports): United States
- Born: October 7, 1963 (age 61)

Singles
- Highest ranking: No. 304 (Sep 26, 1988)

Doubles
- Highest ranking: No. 256 (Aug 15, 1988)

Allyson Ingram Walts (born October 7, 1963) is an American former professional tennis player.

A native of Scottsdale, Ingram was an Arizona state singles champion during her time at Saguaro High School. She played collegiate tennis for both Oklahoma State University and Arizona State University.

Ingraham had a best singles ranking of 304 in the world and made her WTA Tour main draw debut at the 1987 Virginia Slims of Arizona.

Her husband, Butch Walts, was also a professional tennis player.

== ITF finals ==
=== Doubles: 1 (0–1) ===
Outcome	No.	Date	Tournament	Surface	Partner	Opponents	Score
Runner–up	1.	Aug 1988	ITF York, United States	Hard	(United States) Jennifer Young	(New Zealand) Belinda Cordwell (Australia) Kristine Kunce	3–6, 1–6
