= 1987 WCT Scottsdale Open – Singles =

Tennis tournament

Singles
- 1987 WCT Scottsdale Open

Final
- Champion: (United States) Brad Gilbert
- Runner-up: (United States) Eliot Teltscher
- Score: 6–2, 6–2

Details
- Draw: 32 (3WC/4Q)
- Seeds: 8

Events
Singles	Doubles
← 1986 ·	Tennis Channel Open	· 1988 →

Defending champion John McEnroe was unable to compete this year, following a two-month suspension after a code violation caused at the US Open.

Brad Gilbert won in the final 6–2, 6–2 against Eliot Teltscher.

== Seeds ==
1. (Sweden) Mats Wilander (first round)
2. (United States) Tim Mayotte (second round)
3. (United States) Brad Gilbert (champion)
4. (United States) David Pate (semifinals)
5. (United States) Johan Kriek (quarterfinals)
6. (United States) Kevin Curren (quarterfinals)
7. (United States) Eliot Teltscher (final)
8. (United States) Jay Berger (first round)

== Draw ==
=== Key ===
- Q = Qualifier
- WC = Wild card
- LL = Lucky loser
- Alt = Alternate
- ITF = ITF entry
- PR = Protected ranking
- SR = Special ranking
- SE = Special exempt
- JE = Junior exempt
- JR = Junior Accelerator Programme entrant
- CO = College Accelerator Programme entrant
- NG = Next Gen Accelerator Program entrant
- w/o = Walkover
- r = Retired
- d = Defaulted

=== Finals ===
Semifinals
7	(United States) Eliot Teltscher	7	7
4	(United States) David Pate	6	5
3	(United States) Brad Gilbert	6	6
WC	(United States) Michael Chang	3	4

Final
7	(United States) Eliot Teltscher	2	2
3	(United States) Brad Gilbert	6	6

=== Top half ===
First round
1	(Sweden) M Wilander	6	3
(United States) D Goldie	7	6
(Sweden) P Lundgren	6	7
(United States) B Willenborg	3	5
(United States) J Grabb	6	5	6
(United States) J Pugh	0	7	4
(United States) J Rive	2	2
7	(United States) E Teltscher	6	6
4	(United States) D Pate	6	6
(United States) M Purcell	3	1
(United States) G Donnelly	7	4	1
(United States) T Witsken	5	6	6
(United States) R Leach	6	5
Q	(Chile) R Acuña	7	7
Q	(United States) G Failla	4	2
6	(United States) K Curren	6	6

Second round
(United States) D Goldie	1	1
(Sweden) P Lundgren	6	6
(United States) J Grabb	3	3
7	(United States) E Teltscher	6	6
4	(United States) D Pate	7	6
(United States) T Witsken	5	1
Q	(Chile) R Acuña	2	2
6	(United States) K Curren	6	6

Quarterfinals
(Sweden) P Lundgren	6	3	4
7	(United States) E Teltscher	3	6	6
4	(United States) D Pate	6	7
6	(United States) K Curren	2	6

Semifinals
7	(United States) E Teltscher	7	7
4	(United States) D Pate	6	5

=== Bottom half ===
First round
5	(United States) J Kriek	7	6
(Peru) J Yzaga	6	2
Q	(United States) B Pearce	6	6
Q	(Canada) B Gyetko	2	2
(United States) D Rostagno	6	6
(United States) G Holmes	2	4
(United States) M De Palmer	3	2
3	(United States) B Gilbert	6	6
8	(United States) J Berger	3	2
WC	(United States) M Chang	6	6
(United States) M Flur	3	0
(United States) B Testerman	6	6
WC	(United States) K Flach	6	6	1
(Mexico) J Lozano	7	4	6
WC	(United States) J Levine	4	1
2	(United States) T Mayotte	6	6

Second round
5	(United States) J Kriek	6	6
Q	(United States) B Pearce	3	3
(United States) D Rostagno	4	0
3	(United States) B Gilbert	6	6
WC	(United States) M Chang	4	6	6
(United States) B Testerman	6	1	3
(Mexico) J Lozano	6	6
2	(United States) T Mayotte	4	3

Quarterfinals
5	(United States) J Kriek	2	4
3	(United States) B Gilbert	6	6
WC	(United States) M Chang	6	6
(Mexico) J Lozano	4	1

Semifinals
3	(United States) B Gilbert	6	6
WC	(United States) M Chang	3	4
