= 1986 WCT Scottsdale Open – Singles =

Tennis tournament

Singles
- 1986 WCT Scottsdale Open

Final
- Champion: (United States) John McEnroe
- Runner-up: (United States) Kevin Curren
- Score: 6–3, 3–6, 6–2

Details
- Draw: 32
- Seeds: 8

Events
Singles	Doubles
WCT Scottsdale Open	· 1987 →

This was the first edition of the event.

John McEnroe won the title, defeating Kevin Curren 6–3, 3–6, 6–2 in the final.

== Seeds ==
1. (United States) John McEnroe (champion)
2. (United States) Tim Mayotte (second round)
3. (United States) Kevin Curren (final)
4. (United States) David Pate (semifinals)
5. (United States) Paul Annacone (first round)
6. (United States) Jimmy Arias (second round)
7. (United States) Matt Anger (second round)
8. (United States) Jonathan Canter (second round)

== Draw ==
=== Key ===
- Q = Qualifier
- WC = Wild card
- LL = Lucky loser
- Alt = Alternate
- SE = Special exempt
- PR = Protected ranking
- ITF = ITF entry
- JE = Junior exempt
- w/o = Walkover
- r = Retired
- d = Defaulted
- SR = Special ranking

=== Finals ===
Semifinals
1	(United States) John McEnroe	6	6
4	(United States) David Pate	3	3
3	(United States) Kevin Curren	7	6	6
(United States) Todd Witsken	5	7	4

Final
1	(United States) John McEnroe	6	3	6
3	(United States) Kevin Curren	3	6	2

=== Top half ===
First round
1	(United States) J McEnroe	6	6
(South Africa) C van Rensburg	2	4
(Peru) J Yzaga	6	7
(Nigeria) N Odizor	4	5
(United States) G Layendecker	6	7
WC	(United States) A Agassi	4	6
Q	(United States) D Cassidy	3	3
8	(United States) J Canter	6	6
4	(United States) D Pate	3	6	6
(United States) R Leach	6	1	2
(United States) J Sadri	7	3	6
(United States) B Teacher	6	6	7
(Mexico) L Lavalle	6	4	6
(Canada) G Michibata	4	6	2
Q	(United States) J Grabb	3	6	6
5	(United States) P Annacone	6	3	3

Second round
1	(United States) J McEnroe	6	6
(Peru) J Yzaga	3	4
(United States) G Layendecker	7	4	6
8	(United States) J Canter	6	6	3
4	(United States) D Pate	6	6
(United States) B Teacher	4	4
(Mexico) L Lavalle	1	3
(United States) J Grabb	6	6

Quarterfinals
1	(United States) J McEnroe	6	6	6
(United States) G Layendecker	2	7	2
4	(United States) D Pate	6	6
(United States) J Grabb	3	4

Semifinals
1	(United States) J McEnroe	6	6
4	(United States) D Pate	3	3

=== Bottom half ===
First round
6	(United States) J Arias	6	6
(United States) T Nelson	4	4
WC	(United States) P Fleming	3	6	3
(United States) M Davis	6	3	6
(United States) S Davis	4	6	6
Q	(United States) D Goldie	6	3	4
(United States) B Schultz	2	2
3	(United States) K Curren	6	6
7	(United States) M Anger	5	7	6
WC	(United States) G Donnelly	7	6	1
(United States) T Witsken	3	6	6
(United States) M Purcell	6	3	2
Q	(United States) B Scanlon	5	6	4
(United States) S Giammalva Jr.	7	3	6
(United States) M Freeman	3	2
2	(United States) T Mayotte	6	6

Second round
6	(United States) J Arias	3	4
(United States) M Davis	6	6
(United States) S Davis	3	6
3	(United States) K Curren	6	7
7	(United States) M Anger	2	6	5
(United States) T Witsken	6	4	7
(United States) S Giammalva Jr.	4	6	6
2	(United States) T Mayotte	6	4	3

Quarterfinals
(United States) M Davis	7	1	4
3	(United States) K Curren	6	6	6
(United States) T Witsken	6	7	6
(United States) S Giammalva Jr.	7	5	3

Semifinals
3	(United States) K Curren	7	6	6
(United States) T Witsken	5	7	4
