= Janet Lagasse =

American tennis player

Janet Lagasse is a former professional tennis player from the United States of America who won the 1982 French Open girls' doubles championship with Beth Herr.

== Life and career ==
Janet Lagasse's main achievement was winning the French Open girls' doubles championship.
