= 1987 WCT Scottsdale Open – Doubles =

Tennis tournament

Doubles
- 1987 WCT Scottsdale Open

Final
- Champions: (United States) Rick Leach (United States) Jim Pugh
- Runners-up: (United States) Dan Goldie (United States) Mel Purcell
- Score: 6–3, 6–2

Details
- Draw: 16
- Seeds: 4

Events
Singles	Doubles
- WCT Scottsdale Open

Leonardo Lavalle and Mike Leach were the defending champions, but Lavalle did not participate this year. Leach partnered Gary Donnelly, losing in the first round.

Rick Leach and Jim Pugh won the title, defeating Dan Goldie and Mel Purcell 6–3, 6–2 in the final.

== Seeds ==
1. (United States) Gary Donnelly / (United States) Mike Leach (first round)
2. (United States) Kevin Curren / (United States) Mike De Palmer (first round)
3. (United States) Andy Kohlberg / (United States) Robert Van't Hof (quarterfinals)
4. (United States) Rick Leach / (United States) Jim Pugh (champions)

== Draw ==
Key

- Q = Qualifier
- WC = Wild card
- LL = Lucky loser
- Alt = Alternate
- ITF = ITF entry
- PR = Protected ranking
- SR = Special ranking
- SE = Special exempt
- JE = Junior exempt
- JR = Junior Accelerator Programme entrant
- CO = College Accelerator Programme entrant
- NG = Next Gen Accelerator Program entrant
- w/o = Walkover
- r = Retired
- d = Defaulted

=== Draw ===
First round
1	(United States) G Donnelly (United States) M Leach	4	4
(United States) H Pfister (United States) B Testerman	6	6
(United States) G Layendecker (United States) J Letts	6	2	6
WC	(United States) T Mayotte (United States) B Walts	4	6	1
3	(United States) A Kohlberg (United States) R Van't Hof	6	6
(United States) J Kriek (United States) D Pate	1	4
(United States) D Goldie (United States) M Purcell	6	6
(United States) M Flur (United States) E Teltscher	4	2
(United States) K Flach (United States) J Grabb	7	7
(United States) S Denton (United States) G Holmes	5	5
(United States) J Rive (United States) D Tarr	4	0
4	(United States) R Leach (United States) J Pugh	6	6
(Chile) R Acuña (United States) B Pearce	6	7
(United States) D Rostagno (United States) B Willenborg	3	6
(United States) CB Cox (United States) J Levine	6	1	6
2	(United States) K Curren (United States) M De Palmer	4	6	3

Quarterfinals
(United States) H Pfister (United States) B Testerman	4	6
(United States) G Layendecker (United States) J Letts	6	7
3	(United States) A Kohlberg (United States) R Van't Hof	4	6	5
(United States) D Goldie (United States) M Purcell	6	2	7
(United States) K Flach (United States) J Grabb	3	6	3
4	(United States) R Leach (United States) J Pugh	6	1	6
(Chile) R Acuña (United States) B Pearce	6	7
(United States) CB Cox (United States) J Levine	4	5

Semifinals
(United States) G Layendecker (United States) J Letts	4	4
(United States) D Goldie (United States) M Purcell	6	6
4	(United States) R Leach (United States) J Pugh	6	6
(Chile) R Acuña (United States) B Pearce	4	0

Final
(United States) D Goldie (United States) M Purcell	3	2
4	(United States) R Leach (United States) J Pugh	6	6
