= 1985 Japan Open Tennis Championships =

- Date: 14–20 October
- Edition: 12th
- Surface: Hard / outdoor
- Location: Tokyo, Japan
- Venue: Ariake Coliseum

Champions

Men's singles
- (United States) Scott Davis

Women's singles
- (Argentina) Gabriela Sabatini

Men's doubles
- (United States) Scott Davis / (United States) Mischa Zverev

Women's doubles
- (Australia) Belinda Cordwell / (Australia) Julie Richardson
- Japan Open

The 1985 Japan Open Tennis Championships (also known as the 1985 Japan and Asian Open Tennis Championships) was a Grand Prix tennis tournament held in Tokyo, Japan. The tournament was held from 14 to 20 October 1985 and was played on outdoor hard courts. Scott Davis and Gabriela Sabatini won the singles titles.

== Finals ==
=== Men's singles ===
(United States) Scott Davis defeated (United States) Jimmy Arias 6–1, 7–6^{(7–3)}

=== Women's singles ===
(Argentina) Gabriela Sabatini defeated (United States) Linda Gates 6–3, 6–4

=== Men's doubles ===
(United States) Scott Davis / (United States) David Pate defeated (United States) Sammy Giammalva Jr. / (United States) Greg Holmes 7–6^{(7–3)}, 6–7^{(6–8)}, 6–3

=== Women's doubles ===
(New Zealand) Belinda Cordwell / (New Zealand) Julie Richardson defeated (Peru) Laura Gildemeister / (United States) Beth Herr 6–4, 6–4
