= 1986 Japan Open Tennis Championships =

- Date: 13–19 October
- Edition: 13th
- Surface: Hard / outdoor
- Location: Tokyo, Japan
- Venue: Ariake Tennis Park

Champions

Men's singles
- (India) Ramesh Krishnan

Women's singles
- (Canada) Helen Kelesi

Men's doubles
- (United States) Matt Anger / (United States) Ken Flach

Women's doubles
- (United States) Sandy Collins / (United States) Sharon Walsh-Pete
- Japan Open

The 1986 Japan Open Tennis Championships was a tennis tournament played on outdoor hard courts at the Ariake Tennis Park in Tokyo, Japan. It was part of the 1986 Nabisco Grand Prix and of the 1986 Virginia Slims World Championship Series. The tournament ran from 13 October through 19 October 1986. Ramesh Krishnan and Helen Kelesi won the singles titles.

== Finals ==
=== Men's singles ===
(India) Ramesh Krishnan def. (Sweden) Johan Carlsson, 6–3, 6–1

- It was Krishnan's 1st title of the year and the 4th of his career.

=== Women's singles ===
(Canada) Helen Kelesi def. (Argentina) Bettina Fulco, 6–2, 6–2

- It was Kelesi's 1st title of her career.

=== Men's doubles ===
(United States) Matt Anger / (United States) Ken Flach def. (United States) Jimmy Arias / (United States) Greg Holmes, 6–2, 6–3

- It was Anger's 1st title of his career. It was Flach's 3rd title of the year and the 17th of his career.

=== Women's doubles ===
(United States) Sandy Collins / (United States) Sharon Walsh-Pete def. (United States) Susan Mascarin / (United States) Betsy Nagelsen, 6–1, 6–2

- It was Collins' 1st title of the year and the 2nd of her career. It was Walsh-Pete's 1st title of the year and the 23rd of her career.
