= 1987 WCT Scottsdale Open =

- Date: October 5–12
- Edition: 2nd
- Category: Grand Prix (WCT)
- Draw: 32S / 16D
- Prize money: $232,000
- Surface: Hard / outdoor
- Location: Scottsdale, Arizona, U.S.

Champions

Singles
- (United States) Brad Gilbert

Doubles
- (United States) Rick Leach / (United States) Jim Pugh
- WCT Scottsdale Open

The 1987 WCT Scottsdale Open was a men's WCT and Nabisco Grand Prix tennis tournament played on outdoor hard courts in Scottsdale, Arizona in the United States. It was the second edition of the tournament and was held from October 5 through October 12, 1986. Third-seeded Brad Gilbert won the singles title.

== Finals ==
=== Singles ===
(United States) Brad Gilbert defeated (United States) Eliot Teltscher 6–2, 6–2

- It was Gilbert's only singles title of the year and the 11th of his career.

=== Doubles ===
(United States) Rick Leach / (United States) Jim Pugh defeated (United States) Dan Goldie / (United States) Mel Purcell 6–3, 6–2

- It was Leach's 2nd title of the year and the 2nd of his career. It was Pugh's 2nd title of the year and the 2nd of his career.

== See also ==
- 1987 Virginia Slims of Arizona – women's tournament in Scottsdale
