= Gary Lemon =

American tennis player

- Country (sports): United States
- Born: April 16, 1961 (age 63); Los Angeles, United States
- Height: 6 ft 3 in (191 cm)
- Plays: Right-handed

Singles
- Career record: 1–1
- Highest ranking: No. 263 (March 18, 1985)

Doubles
- Career record: 0–1
- Highest ranking: No. 244 (May 6, 1985)

Gary Lemon (born April 16, 1961) is an American former professional tennis player.

A right-handed player from Los Angeles, Lemon played college tennis for the University of Tennessee and the University of Southern California, after which he competed briefly on the professional tour.

Lemon reached a best singles ranking of 263 in the world, with his best performance a second round appearance at the 1985 Japan Open.
