= 1989 Virginia Slims of Arizona =

- Date: September 12–18
- Edition: 4th
- Category: Category 2
- Draw: 32S / 16D
- Prize money: $100,000
- Surface: Hard / outdoor
- Location: Phoenix, Arizona, U.S.
- Venue: Sheraton San Marcos Resort

Champions

Singles
- (Spain) Conchita Martínez

Doubles
- (United States) Penny Barg / (United States) Peanut Louie Harper
← 1988 ·	Virginia Slims of Arizona	· 1990 →

The 1989 Virginia Slims of Arizona was a women's tennis tournament played on outdoor hard courts in Phoenix, Arizona in the United States and was part of the Category 2 tier of the 1989 WTA Tour. It was the fourth edition of the tournament and was held from September 12 through September 18, 1989. First-seeded Conchita Martínez won the singles title and earned $17,000 first-prize money.

== Finals ==
=== Singles ===
(Spain) Conchita Martínez defeated (United States) Elise Burgin 3–6, 6–4, 6–2

- It was Martínez' 3rd singles of the year and the 4th of her career.

=== Doubles ===
(United States) Penny Barg / (United States) Peanut Louie Harper defeated (United States) Elise Burgin / (South Africa) Rosalyn Fairbank 7–6^{(16–14)}, 7–6^{(7–3)}

== See also ==
- 1989 Eagle Classic – men's tournament in Scottsdale
