= 1984 Japan Open Tennis Championships =

- Date: 8–14 October
- Edition: 11th
- Surface: Hard / outdoor
- Location: Tokyo, Japan

Champions

Men's singles
- (United States) David Pate

Women's singles
- (Switzerland) Lilian Drescher

Men's doubles
- (United States) David Dowlen / (Nigeria) Nduka Odizor

Women's doubles
- (United States) Betsy Nagelsen / (United States) Candy Reynolds
- Japan Open

The 1984 Japan Open Tennis Championships was a tennis tournament played on outdoor hard courts in Tokyo, Japan that was part of the 1984 Volvo Grand Prix and the 1984 Virginia Slims World Championship Series. The tournament was held from 8 October through 14 October 1984. David Pate and Lilian Drescher won the singles titles.

== Finals ==
=== Men's singles ===
(United States) David Pate defeated (United States) Terry Moor 6–3, 7–5

- It was Pate's 1st singles title of his career.

=== Women's singles ===
(Switzerland) Lilian Drescher defeated (United States) Shawn Foltz 6–4, 6–2

- It was Drescher' only career title.

=== Men's doubles ===
(United States) David Dowlen / (Nigeria) Nduka Odizor defeated (United States) Mark Dickson / (United States) Steve Meister 6–7, 6–4, 6–3

- It was Dowlen's 2nd title of the year and the 3rd of his career. It was Odizor's 2nd title of the year and the 5th of her career.

=== Women's doubles ===
(United States) Betsy Nagelsen / (United States) Candy Reynolds defeated (Argentina) Emilse Raponi-Longo / (Argentina) Adriana Villagrán-Reami 6–3, 6–2

- It was Nagelsen's 3rd title of the year and the 14th of her career. It was Reynolds' 3rd title of the year and the 20th of her career.
