= David Livingston (tennis) =

American tennis player

- Full name: David Bricker Livingston
- Country (sports): United States
- Born: December 29, 1962 (age 62); Albuquerque, United States
- Height: 5 ft 11 in (180 cm)

Singles
- Career record: 1–1
- Highest ranking: No. 454 (October 27, 1986)

Doubles
- Career record: 4–10
- Highest ranking: No. 98 (July 27, 1987)

Grand Slam doubles results
- US Open: 1R (1987)

David Livingston (born December 29, 1962) is an American former professional tennis player.

Born in Albuquerque, Livingston played college tennis for UCLA from 1982 to 1985. A doubles All-American in 1984, he was a member of two UCLA championship winning teams.

Livingston turned professional after leaving UCLA and in 1986 reached the second round of the Japan Open Grand Prix tournament. He also played #1 doubles and singles representing the United States in a diplomatic envoy to China. It was in doubles that he had more success, with a best ranking of 98 in the world. He featured in the doubles main draw at the 1987 US Open and won two ATP Challenger doubles titles.

== Challenger titles ==
=== Doubles: (2) ===
| No. | Year | Tournament | Surface | Partner | Opponents | Score |
|---|---|---|---|---|---|---|
| 1. | 1986 | Bergen, Norway | Carpet | (United States) Kelly Jones | (Denmark) Peter Bastiansen (West Germany) Patrik Kühnen | 6–7, 7–6, 7–5 |
| 2. | 1987 | Graz, Austria | Hard | (Canada) Grant Connell | (Australia) Carl Limberger (Australia) Mark Woodforde | 7–5, 6–3 |
