= Lilian Drescher =

Swiss tennis player

- Full name: Lilian Drescher Kelaidis
- Country (sports): Switzerland
- Born: 23 May 1965 (age 59); Venezuela
- Prize money: $114,401

Singles
- Career record: 40–38
- Career titles: 1 WTA
- Highest ranking: No. 50 (18 February 1985)

Grand Slam singles results
- Australian Open: 1R (1983, 1984)
- French Open: 2R (1986)
- Wimbledon: 2R (1985)
- US Open: 2R (1985)

Doubles
- Career record: 11–31
- Highest ranking: No. 85 (21 December 1986)

Grand Slam doubles results
- French Open: 2R (1985)
- Wimbledon: 1R (1984, 1987)
- US Open: 2R (1986)

Lilian Drescher Kelaidis (born 23 May 1965) is a former professional tennis player from Switzerland.

== Biography ==
=== Tennis career ===
Born in Venezuela, Drescher was the Junior Orange Bowl (14 & Under) champion in 1979, representing her native country. In the 1980s she played for several years on the professional circuit, based in Switzerland.

Drescher represented Switzerland in the women's singles at the 1984 Summer Olympics in Los Angeles, which was a demonstration event. The only Swiss player in the draw, she had wins over Elizabeth Minter and Renata Šašak, before being eliminated in the quarterfinals by sixth seeded Italian Raffaella Reggi. She also played Federation Cup tennis for Switzerland, in 1984 and 1985, featuring in the second round both years. In 1985 she won a Federation Cup singles match against Czechoslovakia's Helena Suková, but Switzerland lost the tie to the reigning champions.

On the WTA Tour she won one title, the 1984 Japan Open, which she managed to do without dropping a set all tournament, including a win over a young Gabriela Sabatini in the fourth round. She defeated American Shawn Foltz in the final. Early in 1985 she made the round of 16 at the Lipton International Players Championships in Delray Beach, the only tournament of the season outside of Grand Slams to feature a 128 player draw. This performance took her into the top 50 of the world rankings.

She competed in the main draw of all four Grand Slams during her career and reached the second round on three occasions. One of her wins was against future Wimbledon champion Jana Novotna, who was making her Grand Slam debut, at the 1986 French Open.

=== Personal life ===
She married Nicolas Kelaidis, a former Greek Davis Cup representative who had been a national coach in Switzerland in the 1980s. Their son, Carlos, plays collegiate tennis at Clemson University as of 2017 and has been a top 200 ranked junior on the international tour.

== WTA Tour finals ==
=== Singles (1-0) ===
| Result | Date | Tournament | Tier | Surface | Opponent | Score |
|---|---|---|---|---|---|---|
| Win | October, 1984 | Japan Open, Tokyo, Japan | $50,000 | Hard | (United States) Shawn Foltz | 6–4, 6–2 |
