= 1987 Virginia Slims of Arizona =

- Date: March 9–15
- Edition: 2nd
- Category: Category 1+
- Draw: 56S / 24D
- Prize money: $75,000
- Surface: Hard / outdoor
- Location: Scottsdale, Arizona, U.S.
- Venue: Registry Resort

Champions

Singles
- (United States) Anne White

Doubles
- (United States) Penny Barg / (United States) Beth Herr
- Virginia Slims of Arizona

The 1987 Virginia Slims of Arizona was a women's tennis tournament. It was played on outdoor hard courts at the Registry Resort in Scottsdale, Arizona in the United States. The 1987 Virginia Slims of Arizona was a part of the Category 1+ tier of the 1987 WTA Tour. It was the second edition of the tournament and was held from March 9 through March 15, 1987. Fifth-seeded Anne White won the singles title and earned $15,000 first-prize money.

== Finals ==
=== Singles ===
(United States) Anne White defeated (Australia) Dianne Balestrat 6–1, 6–2

- It was White's only singles title of her career.

=== Doubles ===
(United States) Penny Barg / (United States) Beth Herr defeated (United States) Mary Lou Piatek / (United States) Anne White 2–6, 6–2, 7–6^{(7–2)}

== See also ==
- 1987 WCT Scottsdale Open – men's tournament in Scottsdale
