= Shawn Foltz =

American tennis player (born 1967)

- Full name: Shawn Foltz-Emmons
- Country (sports): United States
- Born: December 21, 1967 (age 58)
- Plays: Right-handed
- Prize money: $70,042

Singles
- Career record: 37–54
- Highest ranking: No. 55

Grand Slam singles results
- Australian Open: 1R (1984)
- French Open: 1R (1985)
- Wimbledon: 1R (1985)
- US Open: 2R (1985)

Doubles
- Career record: 35–37
- Highest ranking: No. 140 (November 6, 1989)

Grand Slam doubles results
- Australian Open: 1R (1984)
- French Open: 2R (1985)
- Wimbledon: 1R (1984, 1985)
- US Open: 1R (1984, 1985)

Shawn Foltz-Emmons (born 21 December 1967) is an American former professional tennis player.

== Tennis career ==
From Indianapolis, Foltz was a rising star in junior tennis, but her career on the professional tour was curtailed by wrist injuries. She reached a career high ranking of 55 while touring as an amateur and was runner-up at the 1984 Japan Open.

Following a series of wrist surgeries for a congenital bone disorder, she received a scholarship to the University of Indiana, and despite further injuries, she made it to the top of the collegiate tennis rankings in 1988.

She toured professionally on the WTA tour from 1989 to 1991, and she is now a psychologist living in Arizona.

== Acting ==
Foltz starred as tennis player Missy in the 1982 film Spring Fever, with Carling Bassett.

== WTA Tour finals ==
=== Singles (0-1) ===
| Result | Date | Tournament | Tier | Surface | Opponent | Score |
|---|---|---|---|---|---|---|
| Loss | October 14, 1984 | Japan Open, Tokyo, Japan | $50,000 | Hard | (Switzerland) Lilian Drescher | 4–6, 2–6 |

== ITF finals ==
Legend
$25,000 tournaments
$10,000 tournaments

=== Singles: 1 (0–1) ===
| Outcome | Date | Tournament | Surface | Opponent | Score |
|---|---|---|---|---|---|
| Runner-up | August 6, 1989 | Roanoke, Virginia, United States | Hard | (United States) Shannan McCarthy | 4–6, 4–6 |

=== Doubles: 5 (1–4) ===
| Outcome | No. | Date | Tournament | Surface | Partner | Opponents | Score |
|---|---|---|---|---|---|---|---|
| Runner-up | 1. | June 18, 1989 | Niceville, Florida, United States | Clay | (United States) Lisa Albano | (United States) Alissa Finerman (United States) Stacey Schefflin | 6–4, 2–6, 3–6 |
| Runner-up | 2. | July 2, 1989 | Spartanburg, South Carolina, United States | Clay | (United States) Allison Cooper | (United States) Lisa Bobby (United States) Jennifer Goodling | 1–6, 3–6 |
| Runner-up | 3. | July 9, 1989 | Knoxville, Tennessee, United States | Hard | (United States) Jessica Emmons | (United States) Audra Keller (Australia) Justine Hodder | 4–6, 6–0, 4–6 |
| Runner-up | 4. | July 16, 1989 | Greensboro, North Carolina, United States | Clay | (Denmark) Sofie Albinus | (United States) Courtney Allen (United States) Renata Baranski | 6–2, 3–6, 3–6 |
| Winner | 1. | July 30, 1989 | Evansville, Illinois, United States | Hard | (United States) Niurka Sodupe | (United States) Laura Glitz (United States) Jenni Goodling | 7–5, 6–4 |
