= Kelvin Belcher =

American tennis player

- Full name: Kelvin Belcher
- Country (sports): United States
- Born: September 20, 1961 Gadsden, Alabama, U.S.
- Died: February 18, 2017 (aged 55) Atlanta, Georgia, U.S.
- Height: 6 ft 1 in (185 cm)
- Plays: Right-handed

Singles
- Career record: 4–9
- Highest ranking: No. 193 (January 14, 1985)

Grand Slam singles results
- US Open: 2R (1984)

Doubles
- Career record: 2–3
- Highest ranking: No. 312 (December 23, 1985)

Kelvin Belcher (September 20, 1961 – February 18, 2017) was an American professional tennis player.

== Biography ==
=== Early years ===
Born in Gadsden, Alabama, Belcher was the son of parents who were both teachers. His father Leon is a professor of psychology and his mother worked as an English teacher. He grew up in Houston, attending Lamar High School.

=== Tennis career ===
Belcher played collegiate tennis while at Jackson State University, winning multiple Southwestern Athletic Conference singles titles, before transferring to Texas Southern University, where he graduated in 1983.

At the 1984 US Open he qualified for the main draw and made the second round, with a win over Leif Shiras, who was ranked 39 in the world at the time.

In 1984 and 1985 he featured on the Grand Prix circuit.

=== Later life ===
Following his tennis career he went to medical school at the University of Texas center in Houston and graduated with an M.D. in 1991, later working as a physician.

He died suddenly on February 18, 2017, at the age of 55, while playing a game of golf in Atlanta.
