= Anne White =

American tennis player

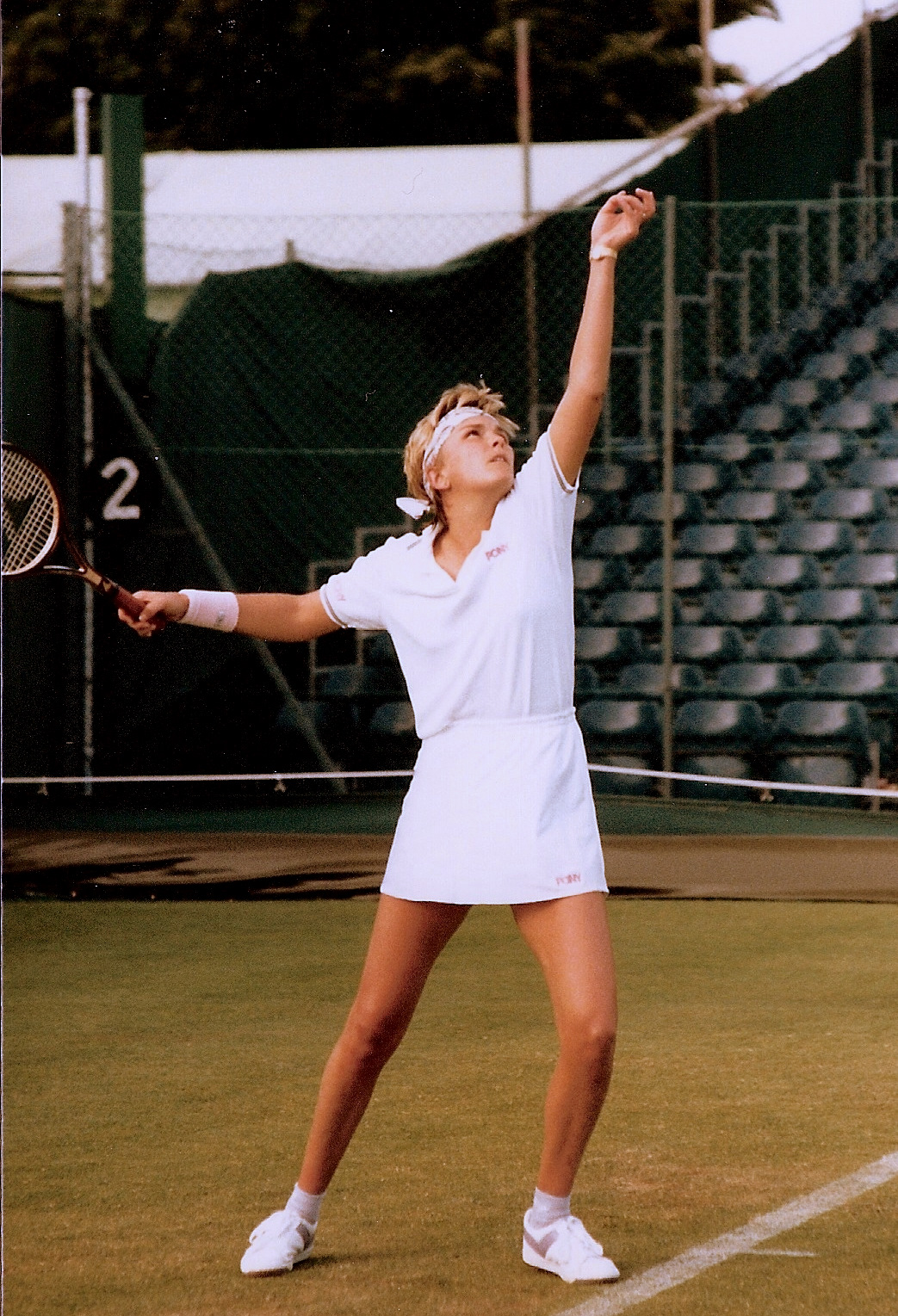
- White at Wimbledon 1986
- Country (sports): United States
- Born: September 28, 1961 (age 64) Charleston, West Virginia, U.S.
- Height: 1.80 m (5 ft 11 in)
- Plays: Right-handed
- Prize money: US$ 411,022

Singles
- Career record: 109–115
- Career titles: 1
- Highest ranking: No. 19 (17 March 1986)

Grand Slam singles results
- Australian Open: 2R (1981 1983)
- French Open: 4R (1984)
- Wimbledon: 3R (1982)
- US Open: 4R (1983)

Doubles
- Career record: 136–108
- Career titles: 8
- Highest ranking: No. 9 (14 March 1988)

Grand Slam doubles results
- Australian Open: 2R (1983, 1984)
- French Open: SF (1985)
- Wimbledon: 3R (1984, 1985)
- US Open: SF (1984)

Grand Slam mixed doubles results
- Wimbledon: QF (1982, 1985)

Anne White (born September 28, 1961) is an American former professional tennis player from Charleston, West Virginia. She is most famous for wearing a white body suit at Wimbledon in 1985.

== Early life ==
White attended John Adams Junior High School. She then graduated from George Washington High School in Charleston, West Virginia, and went on to become a two-time All-American tennis player at the University of Southern California.

== Family background ==
Anne's father, Pete White, played basketball for Clendenin High School. She is not related to Robin White, a contemporary on the WTA tour.

== 1985 Wimbledon Championships ==
White, who was playing fifth seed Pam Shriver in the first round at Wimbledon in 1985 on an outer court, warmed up in a tracksuit. When she took the tracksuit off to start play, she revealed that she was wearing a white, one-piece, lycra body suit, which attracted a lot of attention from the crowd and the photographers. With the match tied at one set all, play was stopped for the day because of bad light, and the tournament referee, Alan Mills, told her to wear more appropriate clothing the next day. She did so, and lost the third set, but the incident was widely reported. She was later quoted as saying, "I had no idea it would be so controversial."

== Results ==
White won her only singles title at Phoenix, Arizona, on March 9, 1987, beating the top seeded Dianne Balestrat in the final. She reached the semifinals of the women's doubles in the 1984 U.S. Open and in 1985 in the French Open.

== Career earnings and prize money ==
White claims that her career earnings are more than a million dollars (possibly including endorsements and other monies). According to official WTA records, her career prize money is $411,022 ranking her at 605th all time as of 8/1/2016.

== Career finals ==
=== Singles (1 title, 1 runner up) ===
| Result | W/L | Date | Tournament | Surface | Opponent | Score |
|---|---|---|---|---|---|---|
| Loss | 0–1 | Jun 1984 | Edgbaston Cup, UK | Grass | (United States) Pam Shriver | 6–7^{(2–7)}, 3–6 |
| Win | 1–1 | Mar 1987 | Virginia Slims of Arizona, US | Hard | (Australia) Dianne Balestrat | 6–2, 6–1 |

== Grand Slam singles tournament timeline ==
Key
| W | F | SF | QF | #R | RR | Q# | DNQ | A | NH |

(W) winner; (F) finalist; (SF) semifinalist; (QF) quarterfinalist; (#R) rounds 4, 3, 2, 1; (RR) round-robin stage; (Q#) qualification round; (DNQ) did not qualify; (A) absent; (NH) not held; (SR) strike rate (events won / competed); (W–L) win–loss record.

| Tournament | 1980 | 1981 | 1982 | 1983 | 1984 | 1985 | 1986 | 1987 | Career SR |
|---|---|---|---|---|---|---|---|---|---|
| Australian Open | A | 2R | 1R | 2R | 1R | A | NH | A | 0 / 4 |
| French Open | A | 3R | 3R | 3R | 4R | 3R | 1R | A | 0 / 6 |
| Wimbledon | A | 1R | 3R | 2R | 1R | 1R | 1R | 2R | 0 / 7 |
| U.S. Open | 2R | 2R | 2R | 4R | 3R | 3R | 1R | 1R | 0 / 8 |
| SR | 0 / 1 | 0 / 4 | 0 / 4 | 0 / 4 | 0 / 4 | 0 / 3 | 0 / 3 | 0 / 2 | 0 / 25 |
