= Linda Gates =

American tennis player

- Country (sports): United States
- Born: 1963 (age 61–62)
- College: Stanford
- Prize money: $36,222

Singles
- Career record: 18–15

Grand Slam singles results
- Australian Open: 1R (1985)
- US Open: 3R (1985)

Doubles
- Career record: 23–14

Grand Slam doubles results
- Australian Open: QF (1985)
- US Open: 2R (1984)
Medal record
Pan American Games
| Bronze medal – third place | 1983 Caracas | Mixed Doubles |

Linda Gates (born 1963) is an American former professional tennis player.

== Biography ==
A native of Burlingame, California, Gates played college tennis for Stanford University in the early 1980s. She made history at the 1985 NCAA Division I Women's Tennis Championships when she became the first woman to win consecutive doubles championships, as well as the first woman to win the singles and doubles championship in the same year. She won the Broderick Award (now the Honda Sports Award) as the nation's top collegiate tennis player in 1985.

Gates had her best performance in a grand slam tournament at the 1985 Australian Open, where she was a quarter-finalist in the women's doubles, partnering Alycia Moulton. Their run included a win over the eighth seeded Maleeva sisters (Katerina and Manuela).

Following her graduation from Stanford in 1985 she competed briefly on the professional tour. At the 1985 US Open, she won through to the third round, playing as a wildcard. She was runner-up to Gabriela Sabatini at the 1985 Japan Open, which was the Argentine's first WTA Tour title.

== WTA Tour finals ==
=== Singles (0-1) ===
| Result | Date | Tournament | Surface | Opponent | Score |
|---|---|---|---|---|---|
| Loss | October 14, 1985 | Tokyo | Hard | (Argentina) Gabriela Sabatini | 3–6, 4–6 |

=== Doubles (0–1) ===
| Result | Date | Tournament | Surface | Partner | Opponents | Score |
|---|---|---|---|---|---|---|
| Loss | March 24, 1986 | Phoenix | Hard | (United States) Alycia Moulton | (United States) Susan Mascarin (United States) Betsy Nagelsen | 3–6, 7–5, 4–6 |

== ITF finals ==
Legend
$25,000 tournaments
$10,000 tournaments

=== Singles: 1 (1–0) ===
| Result | No. | Date | Tournament | Surface | Opponent | Score |
|---|---|---|---|---|---|---|
| Win | 1. | July 7, 1985 | Schenectady, United States | Hard | (United States) Jenni Goodling | 6–1, 6–1 |

=== Doubles: 8 (5–3) ===
| Result | No. | Date | Tournament | Surface | Partner | Opponents | Score |
|---|---|---|---|---|---|---|---|
| Loss | 1. | July 23, 1983 | Birmingham, United States | Hard | (United States) Caryn Copeland | (United States) Cynthia MacGregor (United States) Gretchen Magers | 5–7, 6–7 |
| Win | 1. | June 17, 1984 | Freehold, United States | Hard | (United States) Linda Howell | (Australia) Louise Field (Australia) Michelle Turk | 4–6, 6–2, 6–1 |
| Win | 2. | July 22, 1984 | Fayetteville, United States | Hard | (United States) Cynthia MacGregor | (Australia) Rebecca Bryant (Australia) Natalia Leipus | 6–1, 7–6 |
| Loss | 2. | July 30, 1984 | Delray Beach, United States | Hard | (United States) Cynthia MacGregor | (New Zealand) Julie Richardson (New Zealand) Belinda Cordwell | 5–7, 0–6 |
| Win | 3. | August 18, 1984 | Miramar, United States | Hard | (United States) Cynthia MacGregor | (United States) Patty Fendick (United States) Linda Howell | 6–2, 2–6, 6–4 |
| Win | 4. | June 23, 1985 | Fayetteville, United States | Hard | (United States) Sonia Hahn | (United States) Caroline Kuhlman (United States) Wendy Wood | 6–4, 6–3 |
| Win | 5. | July 1, 1985 | Schenectady, United States | Hard | (United States) Lynn Lewis | (United States) Helena Manset (United States) Cecilia Fernandez-Parker | 7–6, 6–4 |
| Loss | 3. | August 18, 1985 | Roanoke, United States | Hard | (United States) Leigh-Anne Eldredge | (United States) Louise Allen (United States) Ronni Reis | 4–6, 4–6 |
