= Ann Henricksson =

American tennis player

- Country (sports): United States
- Born: October 31, 1959 (age 66)
- Turned pro: 1981
- Retired: 1994
- Prize money: US$632,777

Singles
- Career record: 224–259
- Career titles: 0
- Highest ranking: No. 36 (March 2, 1985)

Grand Slam singles results
- Australian Open: 4R (1985)
- French Open: 2R (1983, 1985)
- Wimbledon: 4R (1990)
- US Open: 3R (1985, 1987)

Doubles
- Career record: 158–236
- Career titles: 3
- Highest ranking: No. 40 (January 1, 1980)

Grand Slam doubles results
- Australian Open: QF (1984)
- French Open: 2R (1982, 1986, 1987)
- Wimbledon: 3R (1987)
- US Open: 3R (1981, 1988)

Mixed doubles
- Career record: 7–9
- Career titles: 0

Grand Slam mixed doubles results
- Australian Open: 2R (1988)
- French Open: SF (1987)
- Wimbledon: 1R (1987, 1988, 1993)
- US Open: QF (1987)

Ann Henricksson (born October 31, 1959) is an American former professional tennis player whose career spanned from 1981 to 1994.

She played two fourth-round Grand Slam matches: the Australian Open (defeated by Zina Garrison), and at Wimbledon (defeated by Monica Seles).

Henricksson won three WTA doubles tournaments.

== WTA career finals ==
Legend	Singles	Doubles
Grand Slam	0–0	0–0
WTA Championships	0–0	0–0
Tier I	0–0	0–0
Tier II	0–0	0–1
Tier III	0–0	0–1
Tier IV & V	0–3	3–4

=== Singles (0–3) ===
Result	W/L	Date	Tournament	Category	Surface	Opponent	Score
Loss	0–1	Nov 1984	Sydney, Australia	Regular	Grass	(United States) Martina Navratilova	1–6, 1–6
Loss	0–2	Mar 1986	Phoenix, US	Regular	Hard	(United States) Beth Herr	0–6, 6–3, 5–7
Loss	0–3	Feb 1989	San Antonio, US	Tier IV	Hard	(West Germany) Steffi Graf	1–6, 4–6

=== Doubles (3–6) ===
Result	W/L	Date	Tournament	Category	Surface	Partner	Opponents	Score
Loss	0–1	Feb 1983	Hershey, US	Category 1+	Carpet (i)	(United States) Sherry Acker	(United States) Lea Antonoplis (United States) Barbara Jordan	3–6, 4–6
Loss	0–2	Sep 1983	Bakersfield, US	Category 1+	Hard	(Brazil) Patricia Medrado	(United States) Kyle Copeland (United States) Lori McNeil	4–6, 3–6
Loss	0–3	Jan 1984	Hershey, US	Regular	Carpet (i)	(United States) Nancy Yeargin	(Czechoslovakia) Kateřina Böhmová (Czechoslovakia) Marcela Skuherská	1–6, 3–6
Win	1–3	Jan 1988	Sydney, Australia	Tier IV	Grass	(Switzerland) Christiane Jolissaint	(West Germany) Claudia Kohde-Kilsch (Czechoslovakia) Helena Suková	7–6, 4–6, 6–3
Win	2–3	Apr 1988	Taipei, Taiwan	Tier V	Carpet (i)	(United States) Patty Fendick	(New Zealand) Belinda Cordwell (New Zealand) Julie Richardson	6–2, 2–6, 6–2
Win	3–3	Jul 1988	Schenectady, US	Tier V	Hard	(New Zealand) Julie Richardson	(United States) Lea Antonoplis (United States) Cammy MacGregor	6–3, 3–6, 7–5
Loss	3–4	Apr 1989	Singapore	Tier V	Hard	(United States) Beth Herr	(New Zealand) Belinda Cordwell (Australia) Elizabeth Smylie	7–6^{(8–6)}, 2–6, 1–6
Loss	3–5	Apr 1989	Tokyo, Japan	Tier V	Hard	(United States) Beth Herr	(Canada) Jill Hetherington (Australia) Elizabeth Smylie	1–6, 3–6
Loss	3–6	Feb 1990	Washington, D.C., US	Tier II	Carpet (i)	(South Africa) Dianne Van Rensburg	(United States) Zina Garrison (United States) Martina Navratilova	0–6, 3–6

== End of season ranking (singles) ==
Year	1987	1988	1989	1990	1991	1992	1993	1994
Rank	60	▼71	▲54	▼112	▼141	▼275	▲139	▼216
