= Rick Rudeen =

American tennis player

- Full name: Rick Rudeen
- Country (sports): United States
- Born: June 5, 1962 (age 62); Chicago, Illinois
- Turned pro: 1985
- Retired: 1988
- Plays: Right-handed
- Prize money: $29,158

Singles
- Career record: 3–6
- Career titles: 0
- Highest ranking: No. 229 (May 19, 1986)

Doubles
- Career record: 11–23
- Career titles: 0
- Highest ranking: No. 110 (February 24, 1986)

Grand Slam doubles results
- Australian Open: 2R (1987)
- US Open: 1R (1986, 1987)

Grand Slam mixed doubles results
- Australian Open: 2R (1987)

Rick Rudeen (born June 5, 1962) is a former professional tennis player from the United States.

== Biography ==
Rudeen was born in Chicago and grew up in Tampa, Florida. In the early 1980s he attended Clemson University, where he played collegiate tennis while he studied for a Computer Science degree. An All-American player, he won a total of 172 NCAA Division I matches during his tennis career at Clemson University.

In 1985 he began competing professionally and that year made the round of 16 at the Tokyo Outdoor Grand Prix tournament, by beating Danny Saltz then Menno Oosting. It was as a doubles player he made more success, with one Grand Prix final, at Auckland in 1986, with regular doubles partner Karl Richter. He made it to 110 in the world in doubles, won two Challenger titles and played in the main draws of both the Australian Open and US Open. His first appearance at the US Open in 1986 came in unusual circumstances when he and partner Derek Tarr were given a place in the first round as lucky losers after the pairing of Peter Fleming and John McEnroe got stuck in traffic and were defaulted for not arriving in time. At the 1987 Australian Open, Rudeen reached the second round of both men's and mixed doubles events.

Retiring in 1988, Rudeen got married and was a tennis pro in Minneapolis for about a year before moving to Atlanta. He was Director of the Ralston/Gorman International Tennis Academy until 1993, then moved to Sioux City and worked for a long period of time with Gateway. Rudeen, who has a son and a daughter, now lives in Dakota Dunes, South Dakota.

== Grand Prix career finals ==
=== Doubles: 1 (0–1) ===
| Result | Year | Tournament | Surface | Partner | Opponents | Score |
|---|---|---|---|---|---|---|
| Loss | 1986 | Auckland, New Zealand | Hard | (United States) Karl Richter | (Australia) Broderick Dyke (Australia) Wally Masur | 3–6, 4–6 |

== Challenger titles ==
=== Doubles: (2) ===
| Year | Tournament | Surface | Partner | Opponents | Score |
|---|---|---|---|---|---|
| 1986 | Benin City, Nigeria | Hard | (United States) Todd Witsken | (Spain) Juan Antonio Rodríguez (Spain) José Clavet | 7–6, 6–3 |
| 1987 | San Luis Potosí, Mexico | Clay | (United States) John Letts | (United States) Karl Richter (United States) Mark Wooldridge | 6–3, 6–4 |
