= Susan Mascarin =

American tennis player

- Full name: Susan Mascarin Keane
- Country (sports): United States
- Residence: Grosse Pointe, Michigan
- Born: June 28, 1964 (age 62) Grosse Pointe Shores, Michigan, United States
- Prize money: $260,633

Singles
- Career record: 65–71
- Career titles: 0
- Highest ranking: No. 32 (April 28, 1986)

Grand Slam singles results
- Australian Open: 1R (1982, 1984, 1988)
- French Open: 3R (1985)
- Wimbledon: 2R (1980, 1981, 1985, 1986)
- US Open: 4R (1984)

Doubles
- Career record: 30–45
- Career titles: 1
- Highest ranking: No. 49 (March 15, 1987)

Susan Mascarin Keane, born Susan Mascarin (born June 28, 1964) is a retired tennis player from the U.S. Her best singles result in a Grand Slam was the 1984 US Open, where she advanced to the fourth round.

Born in Grosse Pointe Shores, Michigan, Mascarin was the US Open Girls' Singles champion in 1980.

== WTA Tour finals ==
=== Singles 1 ===
Legend
Grand Slam	0
WTA Championships	0
Tier I	0
Tier II	0
Tier III	0
Tier IV & V	0

Result	W/L	Date	Tournament	Surface	Opponent	Score
Loss	0–1	Aug 1982	Atlanta, Georgia, U.S.	Hard	(United States) Chris Evert	3–6, 1–6

=== Doubles 2 (1-1) ===
Legend
Grand Slam	0
WTA Championships	0
Tier I	0
Tier II	0
Tier III	0
Tier IV & V	1

Titles by surface
Hard	1
Clay	0
Grass	0
Carpet	0

Result	W/L	Date	Tournament	Surface	Partner	Opponents	Score
Win	1–0	Mar 1986	Phoenix, Arizona, U.S.	Hard	(United States) Betsy Nagelsen	(United States) Linda Gates (United States) Alycia Moulton	6–3, 5–7, 6–4
Loss	1–1	Oct 1986	Tokyo, Japan	Clay	(United States) Betsy Nagelsen	(United States) Sandy Collins (United States) Sharon Walsh	1–6, 2–6

Sporting positions
Preceded by (United States) Kathleen Horvath	Orange Bowl Girls' Singles Champion; Category: 18 and under 1980	Succeeded by (United States) Penny Barg
