= Karl Richter (tennis) =

American tennis player

- Full name: Karl Richter
- Country (sports): United States
- Born: July 21, 1960 (age 64); Auburn, California
- Prize money: $25,679

Singles
- Career record: 1–5
- Career titles: 0
- Highest ranking: No. 285 (July 30, 1984)

Doubles
- Career record: 18–32
- Career titles: 0
- Highest ranking: No. 116 (July 28, 1986)

Grand Slam doubles results
- Australian Open: 2R (1987)
- French Open: 1R (1986)
- Wimbledon: 3R (1986)
- US Open: 2R (1981, 1986)

Karl Richter (born July 21, 1960) is a former professional tennis player from the United States.

== Biography ==
Richter grew up Auburn, California, near Sacramento. As a collegiate player at Texas Christian University (TCU) he won the NCAA Division 1 doubles title in 1981. He and partner David Pate were seeded third and defeated Arkansas's Pat Serret and Peter Doohan in the final. This made them the first players in TCU's history to win a national championship in tennis.

Turning professional in 1983, Richter spent four years on the international tour, mostly as a doubles specialist. His most regular partner on tour was Rick Rudeen and the pair were runners-up at a Grand Prix tournament in Auckland in 1986.

During his professional career he appeared in the main draw of all four Grand Slam tournaments, with a best result coming at the 1986 Wimbledon Championships, where he partnered with Australian player David Graham to make the third round. The pair's second round win was over the Gullikson twins, who had upset the top seeds Stefan Edberg and Anders Järryd in the opening round.

Since retiring he has remained involved in tennis and was an assistant coach at TCU for many years. He worked as a teacher and tennis coach at Aledo High School in Aledo, Texas.

== Grand Prix career finals ==
=== Doubles: 1 (0–1) ===
Result	Year	Tournament	Surface	Partner	Opponents	Score
Loss	1986	Auckland, New Zealand	Hard	(United States) Rick Rudeen	(Australia) Broderick Dyke (Australia) Wally Masur	3–6, 4–6
