= Beth Herr =

American tennis player

Beth Herr Bellamy
- Country (sports): United States
- Born: 28 May 1964 (age 62) Middletown, Ohio
- Height: 5 ft 6 in (1.68 m)
- Turned pro: 1981
- Retired: 1990
- Plays: Right-handed (two-handed backhand)
- Prize money: US$ 391,346

Singles
- Career record: 71–92
- Career titles: 1
- Highest ranking: No. 31 (15 August 1983)

Grand Slam singles results
- Australian Open: 1R (1983, 1984, 1989)
- French Open: 3R (1982)
- Wimbledon: 3R (1987)
- US Open: 3R (1982)

Doubles
- Career record: 102–82
- Career titles: 5
- Highest ranking: No. 26 (10 October 1988)

Grand Slam doubles results
- US Open: QF (1982)

Grand Slam mixed doubles results
- French Open: SF (1986)
- Wimbledon: QF (1988)

Beth Herr (born 28 May 1964) is an American tennis player from Centerville, Ohio, who won four Junior Grand Slam titles, the NCAA singles and team titles and one professional tennis tournament. In her home state of Ohio, she was a two-time high school singles state champion (1980-1981). Her NCAA singles title came in 1983.

== College ==
Herr became the number-one junior tennis player in the world at the age of 16. Upon graduation from Centerville High School, she was the No. 1 college recruit in 1982 and played for the University of Southern California, where she won the NCAA singles title and team title in her first year. She beat Clemson University's Gigi Fernández in the third-set tiebreak, having faced a match point, to win the NCAA singles final.

== Junior Grand Slam titles ==
In 1982, Herr won the 1982 French Open girls' doubles championship with Janet Lagasse, Herr also won the Wimbledon girls' doubles and US Open girls' doubles with Penny Barg and won the US Open girls' singles in the same year.

== Professional career ==
Herr cut short college and went directly into professional tennis after the NCAA Championship, and played on tour for 11 years, with wins over Pam Shriver, Hana Mandlíková, Martina Navratilova, Virginia Wade, and Mary Joe Fernández. In 1983, she lost a second-round singles match to Billie Jean King at Wimbledon, 6–8 in the third set. Commentators on HBO mentioned her ability to hit numerous swinging volleys for winners, something for which no female had previously been noted.

== WTA career finals ==
Legend
Grand Slam	0–0	0–0
Tier I	0–0	0–0
Tier II	0–0	0–0
Tier III	0–0	2–0
Tier IV & V	1–0	0–3

=== Singles: 1–0 ===
Result	W-L	Date	Tournament	Surface	Opponent	Score
Win	1–0	Mar 1986	Phoenix, US	Clay	(United States) Ann Henricksson	6–0, 3–6, 7–5

=== Doubles: 5–2 ===
Result	W-L	Date	Tournament	Surface	Partner	Opponents	Score
Loss	0–1	Aug 1983	Indianapolis, U.S.	Clay	(United States) Gigi Fernández	(United States) Kathleen Horvath (Romania) Virginia Ruzici	5–7, 4–6
Loss	0–2	Oct 1985	Tokyo, Japan	Hard	(Peru) Laura Arraya	(Australia) Belinda Cordwell (Australia) Julie Richardson	4–6, 4–6
Win	1–2	Jul 1986	Berkeley, U.S.	Hard	(United States) Alycia Moulton	(United States) Amy Holton (South Africa) Elna Reinach	6–1, 6–2
Win	2–2	Jul 1986	San Diego, U.S.	Hard	(United States) Alycia Moulton	(United States) Elise Burgin (South Africa) Rosalyn Fairbank	5–7, 6–2, 6–4
Win	3–2	Mar 1987	Phoenix, U.S.	Hard	(United States) Penny Barg	(United States) Mary-Lou Piatek (United States) Anne White	2–6, 6–2, 7–6^{(7–2)}
Win	4–2	Aug 1988	Cincinnati, US	Hard	(United States) Candy Reynolds	(United States) Lindsay Bartlett (Canada) Helen Kelesi	4–6, 7–6, 6–1
Win	5–2	Oct 1988	New Orleans, US	Hard	(United States) Candy Reynolds	(United States) Lori McNeil (United States) Betsy Nagelsen	6–4, 6–4

== Paddle tennis ==
Beth was the winningest player in paddle tennis history winning virtually every event she ever played including the US Open and World Championships of paddle tennis With teammate, Scotty Freedman to become the greatest mixed-doubles team in the sports' history, as they were undefeated as a team from 2000 to 2007.

== Pickleball ==
In her 2022 season, Beth finished #1 in singles, gender doubles and mixed doubles and won a gold medal in all 27 events that she played.

== Personal life ==
After tennis, she finished her undergraduate degree at UCLA and then went to law school at UCLA. She married Tennis Channel founder Steve Bellamy and after a short stint as a lawyer at Manatt, Phelps and Phillips.
