= Virginia Slims of Arizona =

Defunct tennis tournament
- Event name: Virginia Slims of Arizona (1986–89); Arizona Classic (1990–91)
- Tour: WTA Tour
- Founded: 1986
- Abolished: 1991
- Editions: 6
- Location: Phoenix, Arizona (1986–89); Scottsdale, Arizona(1990–91)
- Surface: Hard

The Virginia Slims of Arizona is a defunct WTA Tour affiliated women's tennis tournament played from 1986 to 1991. It was held in Phoenix, Arizona in the United States from 1986 to 1989 and in Scottsdale, Arizona from 1990 to 1991. The tournament was played on outdoor hard courts.

== Results ==
=== Singles ===
Year	Champions	Runners-up	Score
1986	(United States) Beth Herr	(United States) Ann Henricksson	6–0, 3–6, 7–5
1987	(United States) Anne White	(Australia) Dianne Balestrat	6–1, 6–2
1988	(Bulgaria) Manuela Maleeva-Fragnière	(South Africa) Dianne van Rensburg	6–3, 4–6, 6–2
1989	(Spain) Conchita Martínez	(United States) Elise Burgin	3–6, 6–4, 6–2
1990	(Spain) Conchita Martínez	(United States) Marianne Werdel	7–5, 6–1
1991	(Belgium) Sabine Appelmans	(United States) Chanda Rubin	7–5, 6–1

=== Doubles ===
Year	Champions	Runners-up	Score
1986	(United States) Susan Mascarin (United States) Betsy Nagelsen	(United States) Linda Gates (United States) Alycia Moulton	6–3, 5–7, 6–4
1987	(United States) Penny Barg (United States) Beth Herr	(United States) Mary Lou Piatek (United States) Anne White	2–6, 6–2, 7–6
1988	(United States) Elise Burgin (South Africa) Rosalyn Fairbank	(United States) Beth Herr (United States) Terry Phelps	6–7, 7–6, 7–6
1989	(United States) Penny Barg (United States) Peanut Louie-Harper	(United States) Elise Burgin (South Africa) Rosalyn Fairbank	7–6, 7–6
1990	(United States) Elise Burgin (Canada) Helen Kelesi	(United States) Sandy Collins (United States) Ronni Reis	6–4, 6–2
1991	(United States) Peanut Louie-Harper (United States) Cammy MacGregor	(United States) Sandy Collins (South Africa) Elna Reinach	7–5, 3–6, 6–3

== See also ==
- Thunderbird Classic
