= 1982 Davis Cup World Group =

- Date: 5 March – 28 November
- Edition: 2nd

Champions
- United States
- Davis Cup

The World Group was the highest level of Davis Cup competition in 1982.

The United States were the defending champions, and won the title, defeating France in the final, 4–1. The final was held at the Palais des Sports in Grenoble, France, from 26 to 28 November. It was the US team's second consecutive title and their 28th Davis Cup title overall.

== Participating teams ==
Participating teams
Argentina	Australia	Chile	Czechoslovakia
France	Great Britain	India	Italy
Mexico	New Zealand	Romania	Spain
Soviet Union	Sweden	United States	West Germany

=== Draw ===
First round 5–7 March
Carlsbad, CA, United States (hard)
United States	4
India	1
Stockholm, Sweden (indoor carpet)
Sweden	4
Soviet Union	1
Mexico City, Mexico (clay)
Australia	3
Mexico	2
Santiago, Chile (clay)
Romania	1
Chile	3
Christchurch, New Zealand (grass)
Spain	2
New Zealand	3
Rome, Italy (clay)
Italy	3
Great Britain	2
Prague, Czechoslovakia (indoor carpet)
West Germany	0
Czechoslovakia	5
Buenos Aires, Argentina (clay)
France	3
Argentina	2

Quarterfinals; 9–11 July
St. Louis, MO, United States (indoor carpet)
United States	3
Sweden	2
Brisbane, Australia (grass)
Australia	4
Chile	1
Cervia, Italy (clay)
New Zealand	3
Italy	2
Paris, France (clay)
Czechoslovakia	2
France	3

Semifinals; 1–3 October
Perth, Australia (indoor carpet)
United States	5
Australia	0
Aix-en-Provence, France (clay)
New Zealand	2
France	3

Final; 26–28 November
Grenoble, France (indoor clay)
United States	4
France	1

== First round ==
=== United States vs. India ===
United States
4
La Costa Resort Hotel, Carlsbad, CA, United States
5–7 March 1982
Hard

India
1

			1	2	3	4	5
1	(United States) (India)	John McEnroe; Vijay Amritraj	6; 4	9; 7	7; 5
2	(United States) (India)	Eliot Teltscher; Ramesh Krishnan	6; 3	6; 3	6; 4
3	(United States) (India)	Peter Fleming / John McEnroe; Anand Amritraj / Vijay Amritraj	6; 3	6; 1	7; 5
4	(United States) (India)	Eliot Teltscher; Vijay Amritraj	3; 6	5; 7
5	(United States) (India)	John McEnroe; Ramesh Krishnan	6; 1	5; 7	6; 4

=== Sweden vs. Soviet Union ===
Sweden
4
Kungliga tennishallen, Stockholm, Sweden
5–7 March 1982
Carpet (indoors)

Soviet Union
1

			1	2	3	4	5
1	(Sweden) (Soviet Union)	Mats Wilander; Vadim Borisov	9; 7	6; 1	6; 4
2	(Sweden) (Soviet Union)	Anders Järryd; Alexander Zverev	6; 1	3; 6	0; 6	6; 3	6; 2
3	(Sweden) (Soviet Union)	Anders Järryd / Hans Simonsson; Vadim Borisov / Konstantin Pugaev	8; 10	3; 6	6; 2	8; 6	6; 0
4	(Sweden) (Soviet Union)	Joakim Nyström; Konstantin Pugaev	4; 6	6; 3	4; 6
5	(Sweden) (Soviet Union)	Mats Wilander; Alexander Zverev	4; 6	10; 8	6; 2

=== Mexico vs. Australia ===
Mexico
2
Estadio Rafael Osuna, Mexico City, Mexico
5–7 March 1982
Carpet (indoors)

Australia
3

			1	2	3	4	5
1	(Mexico) (Australia)	Francisco Maciel; Mark Edmondson	3; 6	4; 6	1; 6
2	(Mexico) (Australia)	Raúl Ramírez; Peter McNamara	6; 2	6; 3	6; 4
3	(Mexico) (Australia)	Jorge Lozano / Raúl Ramírez; John Alexander / Phil Dent	3; 6	7; 5	7; 5	9; 7
4	(Mexico) (Australia)	Francisco Maciel; Peter McNamara	3; 6	3; 6	0; 6
5	(Mexico) (Australia)	Raúl Ramírez; Mark Edmondson	1; 6	4; 6	2; 6

=== Chile vs. Romania ===
Chile
3
Santiago, Chile
5–7 March 1982
Clay

Romania
1

			1	2	3	4	5
1	(Chile) (Romania)	Belus Prajoux; Ilie Năstase	6; 1	7; 9	4; 6	8; 6	2; 6
2	(Chile) (Romania)	Pedro Rebolledo; Florin Segărceanu	6; 4	6; 2	6; 0
3	(Chile) (Romania)	Jaime Fillol / Belus Prajoux; Andrei Dîrzu / Florin Segărceanu	8; 6	6; 1	2; 6	6; 1
4	(Chile) (Romania)	Pedro Rebolledo; Ilie Năstase	5; 7	6; 4	6; 1	6; 3
5	(Chile) (Romania)	Belus Prajoux; Florin Segărceanu						not played

=== New Zealand vs. Spain ===
New Zealand
3
Wilding Park, Christchurch, New Zealand
5–7 March 1982
Grass

Spain
2

			1	2	3	4	5
1	(New Zealand) (Spain)	Russell Simpson; José López-Maeso	14; 12	6; 3	7; 9	12; 10
2	(New Zealand) (Spain)	Onny Parun; Ángel Giménez	6; 3	6; 3	6; 2
3	(New Zealand) (Spain)	Onny Parun / Russell Simpson; Sergio Casal / Ángel Giménez	3; 6	6; 3	6; 4	3; 6	4; 6
4	(New Zealand) (Spain)	Onny Parun; José López-Maeso	8; 10	3; 6	7; 9
5	(New Zealand) (Spain)	Russell Simpson; Ángel Giménez	2; 6	5; 7	6; 1	6; 3	6; 1

=== Italy vs. Great Britain ===
Italy
3
Foro Italico, Rome, Italy
5–7 March 1982
Clay

Great Britain
2

			1	2	3	4	5
1	(Italy) (United Kingdom)	Adriano Panatta; Buster Mottram	7; 5	5; 7	3; 6	4; 6
2	(Italy) (United Kingdom)	Corrado Barazzutti; Richard Lewis	11; 9	6; 1	6; 1
3	(Italy) (United Kingdom)	Paolo Bertolucci / Adriano Panatta; Andrew Jarrett / Jonathan Smith	6; 4	6; 3	6; 3
4	(Italy) (United Kingdom)	Corrado Barazzutti; Buster Mottram	4; 6	3; 6	5; 7
5	(Italy) (United Kingdom)	Adriano Panatta; Richard Lewis	8; 6	6; 4	6; 2

=== Czechoslovakia vs. West Germany ===
Czechoslovakia
5
Ice Sports Hall, Prague, Czechoslovakia
5–7 March 1982
Carpet (indoors)

West Germany
0

			1	2	3	4	5
1	(Czechoslovakia) (West Germany)	Tomáš Šmíd; Ulrich Pinner	9; 7	6; 4	6; 1
2	(Czechoslovakia) (West Germany)	Ivan Lendl; Rolf Gehring	6; 1	6; 2	6; 2
3	(Czechoslovakia) (West Germany)	Pavel Složil / Tomáš Šmíd; Hans-Dieter Beutel / Christoph Zipf	6; 3	6; 3	6; 4
4	(Czechoslovakia) (West Germany)	Tomáš Šmíd; Rolf Gehring	6; 3	2; 6	6; 3
5	(Czechoslovakia) (West Germany)	Ivan Lendl; Ulrich Pinner	6; 1	6; 3

=== Argentina vs. France ===
Argentina
2
Buenos Aires Lawn Tennis Club, Buenos Aires, Argentina
5–7 March 1982
Clay

France
3

			1	2	3	4	5
1	(Argentina) (France)	Guillermo Vilas; Yannick Noah	6; 1	4; 6	7; 5	3; 6	7; 5
2	(Argentina) (France)	Ricardo Cano; Thierry Tulasne	1; 6	3; 6	2; 6
3	(Argentina) (France)	Alejandro Ganzábal / Guillermo Vilas; Gilles Moretton / Yannick Noah	8; 6	3; 6	2; 6	4; 6
4	(Argentina) (France)	Guillermo Vilas; Thierry Tulasne	6; 1	6; 0	6; 1
5	(Argentina) (France)	Ricardo Cano; Yannick Noah	6; 8	1; 6	6; 8

== Quarterfinals ==
=== United States vs. Sweden ===
United States
3
The Checkerdome, St. Louis, MO, United States
9–11 July 1982
Carpet (indoors)

Sweden
2

			1	2	3	4	5
1	(United States) (Sweden)	John McEnroe; Anders Järryd	10; 8	6; 3	6; 3
2	(United States) (Sweden)	Eliot Teltscher; Mats Wilander	4; 6	5; 7	6; 3	6; 3	0; 6
3	(United States) (Sweden)	Peter Fleming / John McEnroe; Anders Järryd / Hans Simonsson	6; 4	6; 3	6; 0
4	(United States) (Sweden)	Brian Gottfried; Anders Järryd	2; 6	2; 6	4; 6
5	(United States) (Sweden)	John McEnroe; Mats Wilander	9; 7	6; 2	15; 17	3; 6	8; 6

=== Australia vs. Chile ===
Australia
4
Milton Courts, Brisbane, Australia
9–11 July 1982
Grass

Chile
1

			1	2	3	4	5
1	(Australia) (Chile)	John Fitzgerald; Ricardo Acuña	8; 6	7; 5	6; 1
2	(Australia) (Chile)	Mark Edmondson; Pedro Rebolledo	6; 1	6; 2	6; 3
3	(Australia) (Chile)	Peter McNamara / Paul McNamee; Hans Gildemeister / Belus Prajoux	8; 6	2; 6	8; 6	6; 2
4	(Australia) (Chile)	Mark Edmondson; Ricardo Acuña	4; 6	6; 2	4; 6	4; 6
5	(Australia) (Chile)	John Fitzgerald; Pedro Rebolledo	8; 6	3; 6	4; 6	6; 4	6; 2

=== Italy vs. New Zealand ===
Italy
2
Cervia, Italy
9–11 July 1982
Clay

New Zealand
3

			1	2	3	4	5
1	(Italy) (New Zealand)	Corrado Barazzutti; Chris Lewis	6; 3	1; 6	4; 6	3; 6
2	(Italy) (New Zealand)	Adriano Panatta; Russell Simpson	6; 4	3; 6	7; 5	4; 6	2; 6
3	(Italy) (New Zealand)	Paolo Bertolucci / Adriano Panatta; Chris Lewis / Russell Simpson	6; 4	6; 4	3; 6	13; 11
4	(Italy) (New Zealand)	Adriano Panatta; Chris Lewis	4; 6	3; 6	2; 6
5	(Italy) (New Zealand)	Corrado Barazzutti; Bruce Derlin	6; 2	6; 3

=== France vs. Czechoslovakia ===
France
3
Stade Roland Garros, Paris, France
9–11 July 1982
Clay

Czechoslovakia
2

			1	2	3	4	5
1	(France) (Czechoslovakia)	Yannick Noah; Tomáš Šmíd	6; 3	5; 7	6; 3	4; 6	6; 3
2	(France) (Czechoslovakia)	Thierry Tulasne; Ivan Lendl	3; 6	6; 4	3; 6	11; 9	4; 6
3	(France) (Czechoslovakia)	Henri Leconte / Yannick Noah; Pavel Složil / Tomáš Šmíd	2; 6	6; 3	6; 3	6; 4
4	(France) (Czechoslovakia)	Yannick Noah; Ivan Lendl	6; 2	3; 6	7; 9	6; 3	6; 4
5	(France) (Czechoslovakia)	Thierry Tulasne; Tomáš Šmíd	2; 3					retired

== Semifinals ==
=== Australia vs. United States ===
Australia
0
Perth Entertainment Centre, Perth, Australia
1–3 October 1982
Carpet (indoors)

United States
5

			1	2	3	4	5
1	(Australia) (United States)	Peter McNamara; John McEnroe	4; 6	6; 4	2; 6	4; 6
2	(Australia) (United States)	John Alexander; Gene Mayer	4; 6	6; 3	1; 6	2; 6
3	(Australia) (United States)	Peter McNamara / Paul McNamee; Peter Fleming / John McEnroe	2; 6	2; 6	6; 3	6; 8
4	(Australia) (United States)	Mark Edmondson; Gene Mayer	3; 6	3; 6
5	(Australia) (United States)	John Alexander; John McEnroe	4; 6	3; 6

=== France vs. New Zealand ===
France
3
Country Club Aixois, Aix-en-Provence, France
1–3 October 1982
Clay

New Zealand
2

			1	2	3	4	5
1	(France) (New Zealand)	Thierry Tulasne; Russell Simpson	6; 3	4; 6	7; 5	6; 2
2	(France) (New Zealand)	Yannick Noah; Chris Lewis	6; 3	6; 1	7; 5
3	(France) (New Zealand)	Henri Leconte / Yannick Noah; Chris Lewis / Russell Simpson	3; 6	7; 9	4; 6
4	(France) (New Zealand)	Thierry Tulasne; Chris Lewis	4; 6	2; 6	4; 6
5	(France) (New Zealand)	Yannick Noah; Russell Simpson	6; 2	6; 2	6; 2

== Final ==
=== France vs. United States ===
France
1
Palais des Sports, Grenoble, France
26–28 November 1982
Clay (indoors)

United States
4

			1	2	3	4	5
1	(France) (United States)	Yannick Noah; John McEnroe	10; 12	6; 1	6; 3	2; 6	3; 6
2	(France) (United States)	Henri Leconte; Gene Mayer	2; 6	2; 6	9; 7	4; 6
3	(France) (United States)	Henri Leconte / Yannick Noah; Peter Fleming / John McEnroe	3; 6	4; 6	7; 9
4	(France) (United States)	Yannick Noah; Gene Mayer	6; 1	6; 0
5	(France) (United States)	Henri Leconte; John McEnroe	2; 6	3; 6

== Relegation play-offs ==
The first-round losers played in the Relegation Play-offs. The winners of the play-offs advanced to the 1983 Davis Cup World Group, and the losers were relegated to their respective Zonal Regions.

=== Results summary ===
Date: 1–3 October

Home team	Score	Visiting team	Location	Surface	Ref.
Soviet Union	4–1	India	Donetsk	Clay	
Mexico	2–3	Romania	Mexico City	Clay	
Spain	2–3	Great Britain	Barcelona	Clay	
Argentina	3–2	West Germany	Buenos Aires	Clay	

- Argentina, Great Britain, Romania and Soviet Union remain in the World Group in 1983.
- India, Mexico, Spain and West Germany are relegated to Zonal competition in 1983.

=== Soviet Union vs. India ===
Soviet Union
4
Donetsk, Soviet Union
1–3 October 1982
Clay

India
1

			1	2	3	4	5
1	(Soviet Union) (India)	Konstantin Pugaev; Sashi Menon	2; 6	6; 3	6; 4	6; 0
2	(Soviet Union) (India)	Alexander Zverev; Vijay Amritraj	8; 6	6; 1	6; 0
3	(Soviet Union) (India)	Ramiz Akhmerov / Vadim Borisov; Anand Amritraj / Vijay Amritraj	5; 7	5; 7	9; 7	4; 6
4	(Soviet Union) (India)	Alexander Zverev; Sashi Menon	6; 0	6; 3	3; 6	6; 1
5	(Soviet Union) (India)	Konstantin Pugaev; Vijay Amritraj	6; 3	6; 4

=== Mexico vs. Romania ===
Mexico
2
Estadio Rafael Osuna, Mexico City, Mexico
1–3 October 1982
Clay

Romania
3

			1	2	3	4	5
1	(Mexico) (Romania)	Francisco Maciel; Ilie Năstase	4; 6	6; 2	4; 6	8; 10
2	(Mexico) (Romania)	Raúl Ramírez; Florin Segărceanu	7; 5	8; 6	7; 9	6; 2
3	(Mexico) (Romania)	Jorge Lozano / Raúl Ramírez; Ilie Năstase / Florin Segărceanu	3; 6	4; 6	9; 11
4	(Mexico) (Romania)	Raúl Ramírez; Ilie Năstase	6; 2	6; 1	6; 3
5	(Mexico) (Romania)	Francisco Maciel; Florin Segărceanu	1; 6	3; 6	7; 9

=== Spain vs. Great Britain ===
Spain
2
Barcelona, Spain
1–3 October 1982
Clay

Great Britain
3

			1	2	3	4	5
1	(Spain) (United Kingdom)	Fernando Luna; Andrew Jarrett	7; 5	6; 2	5; 7	0; 6	3; 6
2	(Spain) (United Kingdom)	José López-Maeso; Buster Mottram	2; 6	0; 6	2; 6
3	(Spain) (United Kingdom)	Sergio Casal / Ángel Giménez; Andrew Jarrett / Jonathan Smith	4; 6	6; 2	6; 2	6; 4
4	(Spain) (United Kingdom)	José López-Maeso; Andrew Jarrett	7; 5	6; 3	2; 6	7; 5
5	(Spain) (United Kingdom)	Fernando Luna; Buster Mottram	6; 8	6; 8	2; 6

=== Argentina vs. West Germany ===
Argentina
3
Buenos Aires Lawn Tennis Club, Buenos Aires, Argentina
1–3 October 1982
Clay

West Germany
2

			1	2	3	4	5
1	(Argentina) (West Germany)	Guillermo Vilas; Hans-Dieter Beutel	6; 4	6; 1	7; 5
2	(Argentina) (West Germany)	José Luis Clerc; Andreas Maurer	6; 4	4; 6	3; 6	6; 3	6; 2
3	(Argentina) (West Germany)	José Luis Clerc / Guillermo Vilas; Andreas Maurer / Wolfgang Popp	6; 4	6; 2	6; 4
4	(Argentina) (West Germany)	Carlos Castellan; Hans-Dieter Beutel	3; 6	0; 6
5	(Argentina) (West Germany)	Alejandro Ganzábal; Michael Westphal	7; 9	4; 6
