= Julia Salnikova =

Soviet tennis player (born 1964)

- Full name: Julia Sergeyevna Salnikova
- Native name: Юлия Сергеевна Сальникова
- Country (sports): Soviet Union; Greece
- Born: 13 August 1964 (age 61) Moscow, Russian SFSR, USSR
- Plays: Right-handed (one-handed backhand)
- Prize money: $38,157

Singles
- Highest ranking: No. 194 (15 October 1990)

Doubles
- Highest ranking: No. 130 (13 April 1992)
Medal record
Representing Soviet Union
Friendship Games
Gold medal – first place	1984	Women's doubles
Bronze medal – third place	1984	Women's singles

Julia Sergeyevna Salnikova (Russian: Юлия Сергеевна Сальникова, Greek: Ιουλία (Τζούλια) Σάλνικοβα; born 13 August 1964), also known as Julia Apostoli, is a Russian-born Greek former professional tennis player who represented the Soviet Union and (from 1990 onwards) Greece.

== Early life ==
Salnikova was born in Moscow, the daughter of Russian football player and manager Sergei Salnikov, who was half Greek and half Russian. Her father was a member of the Soviet association football national team which won the gold medal at the 1956 Summer Olympics, and at club level both played and managed FC Spartak Moscow. Her father died when she was 18 years old. She has a twin sister.

She originally was supposed to be a diver, having taken lessons at Dynamo Moscow, but later switched sports to tennis.

== Career ==
She debuted for the Soviet Union Fed Cup team in the 1980 quarterfinal loss to the United States, featuring in the doubles with Olga Zaitseva, a dead rubber which they lost to the Americans. Over the next two years she competed in all ties for the Soviet Union. In 1981 she played the opening rubber in each tie and won them all, over Denmark's Tine Scheuer-Larsen, Czechoslovakia's Renáta Tomanová and Britain's Virginia Wade, the latter in the Soviet Union's quarter-final loss. She extended her singles record to five wins from five matches in 1982 when she beat her Spanish and Peruvian opponents, also appearing in a live doubles rubber to win the second round tie against Peru. In the 1982 quarter-final she suffered her only singles loss, to Dianne Fromholtz, as the Soviet Union went down to Australia.

At the Friendship Games in 1984, Salnikova won a gold medal in women's doubles, as well as a bronze in the singles.

She rarely featured in international tennis for the remainder of the 1980s in order to concentrate on her studies, graduating with a journalism degree from Moscow State University in 1990.

Salnikova returned to tennis in 1990 under the flag of Greece, having taken up citizenship through her marriage to Greek tennis coach Apostolos Tsitsipas. She played on the WTA Tour until 1992.

== Personal life ==
Her sons, Stefanos and Petros Tsitsipas, competes on the professional ATP tour. Salnikova has four children with her husband Apostolos, and all of them are tennis players. She lives in Monaco when not traveling. She is also officially listed as a coach of her younger son on his ATP profile.

== ITF finals ==
=== Singles: 4 (3–1) ===
Result	No.	Date	Tournament	Surface	Opponent	Score
Win	1.	12 March 1990	Reims, France	Clay	(France) Marie-Pierre Villani	7–5, 4–6, 6–0
Loss	2.	14 May 1990	Marsa, Malta	Clay	(Socialist Federal Republic of Yugoslavia) Nadin Ercegović	3–6, 2–6
Win	3.	6 August 1990	Paderborn, West Germany	Clay	(West Germany) Heike Thoms	6–1, 6–0
Win	4.	4 April 1994	Athens, Greece	Clay	(Russia) Irina Zvereva	6–0, 6–3

=== Doubles: 4 (1–3) ===
Result	No.	Date	Tournament	Surface	Partner	Opponents	Score
Win	1.	21 August 1989	Neumünster, West Germany	Clay	(Soviet Union) Agnese Blumberga	(Sweden) Catarina Bernstein (Sweden) Annika Narbe	6–1, 6–2
Loss	2.	12 March 1990	Reims, France	Clay	(United Kingdom) Kaye Hand	(Czechoslovakia) Leona Lásková (Czechoslovakia) Michaela Peterová	2–6, 6–3, 3–6
Loss	3.	6 August 1990	Paderborn, West Germany	Clay	(Soviet Union) Anna Mirza	(West Germany) Heike Thoms (West Germany) Tanja Hauschildt	3–6, 1–6
Loss	4.	8 May 1995	Le Touquet, France	Clay	(France) Sylvie Sabas	(France) Amélie Mauresmo (United Kingdom) Amanda Wainwright	4–6, 2–6

== Other finals ==
=== Singles (0-1) ===
Result	No.	Year	Tournament	Location	Opponent	Score
Loss	1.	1985	USSR Tennis National Championship	Tbilisi, Georgian SSR	(Soviet Union) Svetlana Parkhomenko	7–6, 4–6, 2–6

=== Doubles (0-2) ===
Result	No.	Year	Tournament	Location	Partner	Opponents	Score
Loss	1.	1983	USSR Tennis National Championship	Jūrmala, Latvian SSR	(Soviet Union) Natasha Reva	(Soviet Union) Svetlana Parkhomenko (Soviet Union) Larisa Savchenko	2–6, 0–6
Loss	2.	1984	USSR Tennis National Championship	Tashkent, Uzbek SSR	(Soviet Union) Elena Eliseenko	(Soviet Union) Svetlana Parkhomenko (Soviet Union) Larisa Savchenko	1–6, 2–6

=== Mixed (2-1) ===
Result	No.	Year	Tournament	Location	Partner	Opponents	Score
Loss	1.	1982	USSR Tennis National Championship	Kharkiv, Ukrainian SSR	(Soviet Union) Aleksandr Bogomolov	(Soviet Union) Natasha Chmyreva (Soviet Union) Sergey Leonyuk	0–6, 5–7
Win	2.	1984	USSR Tennis National Championship	Tashkent, Uzbek SSR	(Soviet Union) Ģirts Dzelde	(Soviet Union) Larisa Savchenko (Soviet Union) Alvis Zilgalvis	7–5, 6–2
Win	3.	1985	USSR Tennis National Championship	Tbilisi, Georgian SSR	(Soviet Union) Ģirts Dzelde	(Soviet Union) Elena Eliseenko (Soviet Union) Sergey Leonyuk	7–6, 7–5
