= List of Russia Davis Cup team representatives =

This is a list of tennis players who have represented the Russia Davis Cup team in an official Davis Cup match. Russia have taken part in the competition since 1993. They competed as the Soviet Union (USSR) from 1962 to 1991 and the Commonwealth of Independent States (CIS) in 1992.

== Russia players ==
Player	W-L (Total)	W-L (Singles)	W-L (Doubles)	Ties	Debut
Daniil Medvedev	0–0	0–0	0–0	1	2017
Aslan Karatsev	0–1	0–1	0–0	1	2016
Andrey Rublev	8–2	4–2	4–0	6	2014
Andrey Kuznetsov	8–0	7–0	1–0	5	2013
Konstantin Kravchuk	10–4	3–2	7–2	9	2013
Karen Khachanov	1–3	1–2	0–1	3	2013
Evgeny Donskoy	5–4	3–3	2–1	7	2013
Victor Baluda	0–1	0–0	0–1	1	2013
Stanislav Vovk	0–1	0–1	0–0	1	2012
Alex Bogomolov Jr.	0–2	0–2	0–0	1	2012
Teymuraz Gabashvili	6–6	6–4	0–2	8	2009
Igor Kunitsyn	3–8	2–2	1–6	8	2008
Dmitry Tursunov	12–13	10–5	2–8	14	2005
Igor Andreev	14–14	11–10	3–4	15	2004
Nikolay Davydenko	17–11	14–9	3–2	17	2003
Andrei Stoliarov	2–0	2–0	0–0	2	2001
Mikhail Youzhny	21–17	15–11	6–6	25	2000
Kirill Ivanov-Smolensky	0–1	0–1	0–0	1	1998
Marat Safin	31–21	21–15	10–6	23	1998
Andrei Chesnokov	6–6	27–17	1–1	23	1995
Alexander Volkov	5–5	15–6	2–4	16	1994
Andrei Olhovskiy	10–12	2–2	11–13	24	1993
Yevgeny Kafelnikov	44–28	31–16	13–12	28	1993
Andrei Cherkasov	4–5	14–9	3–4	13	1993

== CIS players ==
Player	W-L (Total)	W-L (Singles)	W-L (Doubles)	Ties	Debut
Alexander Volkov	2–0	2–0	0–0	1	1992
Andrei Olhovskiy	1–0	0–0	1–0	1	1992
Vladimer Gabrichidze	0–1	0–0	0–1	1	1992
Andrei Chesnokov	1–1	1–1	0–0	1	1992
Andrei Cherkasov	5–1	4–0	1–1	2	1992

== USSR players ==
Player	W-L (Total)	W-L (Singles)	W-L (Doubles)	Ties	Debut
Dimitri Poliakov	1–2	0–0	1–2	3	1990
Vladimer Gabrichidze	0–1	0–0	0–1	1	1990
Andrei Cherkasov	8–7	8–6	0–1	7	1988
Oleksandr Dolgopolov	1–1	1–1	0–0	1	1987
Alexander Volkov	10–5	8–1	2–4	9	1986
Andrei Olhovskiy	2–3	0–0	2–3	5	1983
Andrei Chesnokov	21–11	20–10	1–1	16	1983
Alexander Zverev	18–18	12–14	6–4	16	1980
Sergey Leonyuk	8–6	1–2	7–4	13	1980
Ramiz Akhmerov	0–2	0–1	0–1	2	1979
Konstantin Pugaev	12–5	10–2	2–3	8	1976
Vadim Borisov	11–12	8–6	3–6	11	1976
Anatoli Volkov	0–2	0–2	0–0	1	1975
Teimuraz Kakulia	17–14	12–12	5–2	15	1972
Vladimir Korotkov	10–11	9–9	1–2	13	1969
Alexander Ivanov	0–2	0–2	0–0	1	1966
Mikhail Mozer	4–0	4–0	0–0	2	1963
Alex Metreveli	80–25	56–14	24–11	38	1963
Rudolf Sivokhin	1–0	1–0	0–0	1	1962
Sergei Likhachev	26–11	2–2	24–9	33	1962
Toomas Leius	23–23	17–21	6–2	20	1962
