= 1985 Davis Cup World Group =

- Date: 8 March – 22 December
- Edition: 5th

Champions
- Sweden
- Davis Cup

The World Group was the highest level of Davis Cup competition in 1985.

Sweden were the defending champions and won the title, defeating West Germany in the final, 3–2. The final was held at the Olympiahalle in Munich, West Germany, from 20 to 22 December. It was the Swedish team's second consecutive title and their 3rd Davis Cup title overall.

== Participating teams ==
Participating teams
Argentina	Australia	Chile	Czechoslovakia
Ecuador	France	India	Italy
Japan	Paraguay	Soviet Union	Spain
Sweden	United States	West Germany	Yugoslavia

=== Draw ===
First round 8–10 March
Kyoto, Japan (indoor carpet)
United States	5
Japan	0
Sindelfingen, West Germany (indoor carpet)
Spain	2
West Germany	3
Tbilisi, Soviet Union (indoor carpet)
Czechoslovakia	3
Soviet Union	2
Buenos Aires, Argentina (clay)
Argentina	1
Ecuador	4
Asunción, Paraguay (indoor carpet)
Paraguay	3
France	2
Split, Yugoslavia (indoor clay)
Yugoslavia	2
Australia	3
Calcutta, India (grass)
India	3
Italy	2
Santiago, Chile (clay) [19–21 April]
Chile	1
Sweden	4

Quarterfinals; 2–4 August
Hamburg, West Germany (clay)
United States	2
West Germany	3
Guayaquil, Ecuador (clay)
Czechoslovakia	5
Ecuador	0
Sydney, Australia (grass)
Paraguay	2
Australia	3
Bangalore, India (grass)
India	1
Sweden	4

Semifinals; 4–6 October
Frankfurt, West Germany (indoor carpet)
West Germany	5
Czechoslovakia	0
Malmö, Sweden (indoor clay)
Australia	0
Sweden	5

Final; 20–22 December
Munich, West Germany (indoor carpet)
West Germany	2
Sweden	3

== First round ==
=== Japan vs. United States ===
Japan
0
Kyoto Prefectural Gymnasium, Kyoto, Japan
8–10 March 1985
Carpet (indoors)

United States
5

			1	2	3	4	5
1	(Japan) (United States)	Kaoru Maruyama; Eliot Teltscher	1; 6	1; 6	1; 6
2	(Japan) (United States)	Shozo Shiraishi; Aaron Krickstein	4; 6	1; 6	6; 3	4; 6
3	(Japan) (United States)	Shigeyuki Nishio / Shinichi Sakamoto; Ken Flach / Robert Seguso	2; 6	3; 6	1; 6
4	(Japan) (United States)	Kaoru Maruyama; Aaron Krickstein	1; 6	1; 6
5	(Japan) (United States)	Shozo Shiraishi; Eliot Teltscher	3; 6	2; 6

=== West Germany vs. Spain ===
West Germany
3
Sindelfingen, West Germany
8–10 March 1985
Carpet (indoors)

Spain
2

			1	2	3	4	5
1	(West Germany) (Spain)	Michael Westphal; Sergio Casal	10; 8	6; 3	2; 6	2; 6	6; 4
2	(West Germany) (Spain)	Boris Becker; Juan Aguilera	6; 3	6; 4	6; 4
3	(West Germany) (Spain)	Boris Becker / Andreas Maurer; Sergio Casal / Emilio Sánchez	4; 6	6; 3	1; 6	6; 3	6; 4
4	(West Germany) (Spain)	Boris Becker; Sergio Casal	4; 6	6; 1	5; 7
5	(West Germany) (Spain)	Michael Westphal; Juan Aguilera	4; 6	6; 3	3; 6

=== Soviet Union vs. Czechoslovakia ===
Soviet Union
2
Tbilisi, Soviet Union
8–10 March 1985
Carpet (indoors)

Czechoslovakia
3

			1	2	3	4	5
1	(Soviet Union) (Czechoslovakia)	Konstantin Pugaev; Miloslav Mečíř	4; 6	3; 6	7; 9
2	(Soviet Union) (Czechoslovakia)	Alexander Zverev; Tomáš Šmíd	3; 6	4; 6	3; 6
3	(Soviet Union) (Czechoslovakia)	Sergey Leonyuk / Alexander Zverev; Libor Pimek / Tomáš Šmíd	3; 6	4; 6	11; 9	8; 6	7; 5
4	(Soviet Union) (Czechoslovakia)	Alexander Zverev; Miloslav Mečíř	3; 6	6; 8	6; 0	6; 8
5	(Soviet Union) (Czechoslovakia)	Konstantin Pugaev; Libor Pimek	8; 6	6; 2

=== Argentina vs. Ecuador ===
Argentina
1
Buenos Aires Lawn Tennis Club, Buenos Aires, Argentina
8–10 March 1985
Clay

Ecuador
4

			1	2	3	4	5
1	(Argentina) (Ecuador)	José Luis Clerc; Andrés Gómez	6; 4	4; 6	11; 13	3; 6
2	(Argentina) (Ecuador)	Martín Jaite; Raúl Viver	6; 4	5; 7	5; 7	6; 2	6; 3
3	(Argentina) (Ecuador)	José Luis Clerc / Martín Jaite; Andrés Gómez / Ricardo Ycaza	11; 13	3; 6	6; 3	4; 6
4	(Argentina) (Ecuador)	Martín Jaite; Andrés Gómez	1; 6	4; 6	4; 6
5	(Argentina) (Ecuador)	Roberto Argüello; Raúl Viver	1; 6	6; 4	3; 6

=== Paraguay vs. France ===
Paraguay
3
Estadio Hugo Stroessner, Asunción, Paraguay
8–10 March 1985
Carpet (indoors)

France
2

			1	2	3	4	5
1	(Paraguay) (France)	Víctor Pecci; Yannick Noah	6; 8	15; 13	2; 6	8; 6	10; 8
2	(Paraguay) (France)	Francisco González; Henri Leconte	4; 6	6; 3	3; 6	6; 3	6; 4
3	(Paraguay) (France)	Francisco González / Víctor Pecci; Henri Leconte / Yannick Noah	2; 6	6; 3	8; 6	5; 7	3; 6
4	(Paraguay) (France)	Francisco González; Yannick Noah	6; 3	3; 6	15; 17	4; 6
5	(Paraguay) (France)	Víctor Pecci; Henri Leconte	6; 3	6; 4	3; 6	7; 5

=== Yugoslavia vs. Australia ===
Yugoslavia
2
Split, Yugoslavia
8–10 March 1985
Clay (indoors)

Australia
3

			1	2	3	4	5
1	(Socialist Federal Republic of Yugoslavia) (Australia)	Marko Ostoja; Paul McNamee	6; 3	6; 3	8; 10	0; 6	4; 6
2	(Socialist Federal Republic of Yugoslavia) (Australia)	Slobodan Živojinović; Pat Cash	7; 5	5; 7	10; 8	6; 4
3	(Socialist Federal Republic of Yugoslavia) (Australia)	Goran Prpić / Slobodan Živojinović; Pat Cash / John Fitzgerald	5; 7	12; 10	8; 6	4; 6	4; 6
4	(Socialist Federal Republic of Yugoslavia) (Australia)	Marko Ostoja; Pat Cash	2; 6	0; 6	2; 6
5	(Socialist Federal Republic of Yugoslavia) (Australia)	Slobodan Živojinović; Paul McNamee	3; 6	6; 3	6; 3

=== India vs. Italy ===
India
3
Calcutta, India
8–10 March 1985
Grass

Italy
2

			1	2	3	4	5
1	(India) (Italy)	Ramesh Krishnan; Francesco Cancellotti	6; 3	11; 9	4; 6	3; 6	6; 4
2	(India) (Italy)	Vijay Amritraj; Claudio Panatta	6; 1	6; 4	5; 7	3; 6	6; 3
3	(India) (Italy)	Anand Amritraj / Sashi Menon; Gianni Ocleppo / Claudio Panatta	3; 6	3; 6	7; 9
4	(India) (Italy)	Vijay Amritraj; Francesco Cancellotti	5; 7	6; 4	6; 3	8; 6
5	(India) (Italy)	Ramesh Krishnan; Claudio Panatta	8; 6	4; 6	1; 6

=== Chile vs. Sweden ===
Chile
1
Estadio Nacional, Santiago, Chile
19–21 April 1985
Clay

Sweden
4

			1	2	3	4	5
1	(Chile) (Sweden)	Hans Gildemeister; Stefan Edberg	6; 3	2; 6	6; 4	7; 5
2	(Chile) (Sweden)	Pedro Rebolledo; Henrik Sundström	9; 7	2; 6	0; 6	7; 9
3	(Chile) (Sweden)	Ricardo Acuña / Hans Gildemeister; Stefan Edberg / Jan Gunnarsson	1; 6	6; 1	3; 6	3; 6
4	(Chile) (Sweden)	Hans Gildemeister; Henrik Sundström	1; 6	6; 3	5; 7	2; 6
5	(Chile) (Sweden)	Pedro Rebolledo; Stefan Edberg	4; 6	6; 4	2; 6

== Quarterfinals ==
=== West Germany vs. United States ===
West Germany
3
Am Rothenbaum, Hamburg, West Germany
2–4 August 1985
Clay

United States
2

			1	2	3	4	5
1	(West Germany) (United States)	Boris Becker; Eliot Teltscher	6; 2	6; 2	6; 3
2	(West Germany) (United States)	Hans Schwaier; Aaron Krickstein	2; 6	6; 1	2; 6	6; 1	8; 6
3	(West Germany) (United States)	Boris Becker / Andreas Maurer; Ken Flach / Robert Seguso	2; 6	8; 6	1; 6	6; 4	5; 7
4	(West Germany) (United States)	Hans Schwaier; Eliot Teltscher	4; 6	6; 2	7; 5	4; 6	2; 6
5	(West Germany) (United States)	Boris Becker; Aaron Krickstein	6; 2	6; 2	6; 1

=== Ecuador vs. Czechoslovakia ===
Ecuador
0
Guayaquil Tenis Club, Guayaquil, Ecuador
2–4 August 1985
Clay

Czechoslovakia
5

			1	2	3	4	5
1	(Ecuador) (Czechoslovakia)	Andrés Gómez; Ivan Lendl	3; 5					retired
2	(Ecuador) (Czechoslovakia)	Raúl Viver; Miloslav Mečíř	0; 6	1; 6	3; 6
3	(Ecuador) (Czechoslovakia)	Martín Aguirre / Ricardo Ycaza; Ivan Lendl / Tomáš Šmíd	5; 7	4; 6	4; 6
4	(Ecuador) (Czechoslovakia)	Ricardo Ycaza; Miloslav Mečíř	4; 6	3; 6
5	(Ecuador) (Czechoslovakia)	Martín Aguirre; Tomáš Šmíd	0; 6	1; 6

=== Australia vs. Paraguay ===
Australia
3
White City Stadium, Sydney, Australia
2–4 August 1985
Grass

Paraguay
2

			1	2	3	4	5
1	(Australia) (Paraguay)	Paul McNamee; Francisco González	3; 6	6; 0	6; 3	6; 1
2	(Australia) (Paraguay)	John Fitzgerald; Víctor Pecci	2; 6	3; 6	6; 1	4; 6
3	(Australia) (Paraguay)	Mark Edmondson / Paul McNamee; Francisco González / Víctor Pecci	3; 6	10; 8	3; 6	6; 1	3; 6
4	(Australia) (Paraguay)	Paul McNamee; Víctor Pecci	6; 8	7; 5	6; 2	9; 7
5	(Australia) (Paraguay)	John Fitzgerald; Francisco González	6; 3	9; 7	7; 5

=== India vs. Sweden ===
India
1
Cubbon Park, Bangalore, India
2–4 August 1985
Grass

Sweden
4

			1	2	3	4	5
1	(India) (Sweden)	Vijay Amritraj; Anders Järryd	6; 3	5; 7	6; 2	3; 6	4; 6
2	(India) (Sweden)	Ramesh Krishnan; Mats Wilander	3; 6	3; 6	2; 6
3	(India) (Sweden)	Anand Amritraj / Vijay Amritraj; Stefan Edberg / Anders Järryd	19; 21	6; 2	3; 6	4; 6
4	(India) (Sweden)	Vijay Amritraj; Mats Wilander	8; 6	9; 7
5	(India) (Sweden)	Ramesh Krishnan; Anders Järryd	3; 6	6; 4	1; 6

== Semifinals ==
=== West Germany vs. Czechoslovakia ===
West Germany
5
Frankfurt, West Germany
4–6 October 1985
Carpet (indoors)

Czechoslovakia
0

			1	2	3	4	5
1	(West Germany) (Czechoslovakia)	Boris Becker; Miloslav Mečíř	6; 3	7; 5	6; 4
2	(West Germany) (Czechoslovakia)	Michael Westphal; Tomáš Šmíd	6; 8	1; 6	7; 5	11; 9	17; 15
3	(West Germany) (Czechoslovakia)	Boris Becker / Andreas Maurer; Ivan Lendl / Tomáš Šmíd	6; 1	7; 5	6; 4
4	(West Germany) (Czechoslovakia)	Boris Becker; Libor Pimek	6; 1	6; 4
5	(West Germany) (Czechoslovakia)	Michael Westphal; Miloslav Mečíř	6; 3	6; 4

=== Sweden vs. Australia ===
Sweden
5
Baltiska Hallen, Malmö, Sweden
4–6 October 1985
Clay (indoors)

Australia
0

			1	2	3	4	5
1	(Sweden) (Australia)	Anders Järryd; Peter McNamara	6; 4	6; 4	13; 11
2	(Sweden) (Australia)	Mats Wilander; Wally Masur	6; 1	6; 1	6; 0
3	(Sweden) (Australia)	Stefan Edberg / Anders Järryd; Mark Edmondson / John Fitzgerald	6; 4	6; 3	6; 4
4	(Sweden) (Australia)	Mats Wilander; Peter McNamara	6; 4	6; 3
5	(Sweden) (Australia)	Anders Järryd; Wally Masur	6; 1	6; 2

== Final ==
=== West Germany vs. Sweden ===
West Germany
2
Olympiahalle, Munich, West Germany
20–22 December 1985
Carpet (indoors)

Sweden
3

			1	2	3	4	5
1	(West Germany) (Sweden)	Michael Westphal; Mats Wilander	3; 6	4; 6	8; 10
2	(West Germany) (Sweden)	Boris Becker; Stefan Edberg	6; 3	3; 6	7; 5	8; 6
3	(West Germany) (Sweden)	Boris Becker / Andreas Maurer; Joakim Nyström / Mats Wilander	4; 6	2; 6	1; 6
4	(West Germany) (Sweden)	Boris Becker; Mats Wilander	6; 3	2; 6	6; 3	6; 3
5	(West Germany) (Sweden)	Michael Westphal; Stefan Edberg	6; 3	5; 7	4; 6	3; 6

== Relegation play-offs ==
The first-round losers played in the Relegation Play-offs. The winners of the play-offs advanced to the 1986 Davis Cup World Group, and the losers were relegated to their respective Zonal Regions.

=== Results summary ===
Date: 4–6 October

Home team	Score	Visiting team	Location	Door	Surface	Ref.
Japan	0–3	Spain	Tokyo	Outdoor	Clay	
Argentina	2–3	Soviet Union	Buenos Aires	Outdoor	Clay	
Yugoslavia	4–1	France	Belgrade	Indoor	Hard	
Italy	3–1	Chile	Cagliari	Outdoor	Clay	

- Italy, Soviet Union, Spain and Yugoslavia remain in the World Group in 1986.
- Argentina, Chile, France and Japan are relegated to Zonal competition in 1986.

=== Japan vs. Spain ===
Japan
0
Den-En Colisseum, Tokyo, Japan
4–6 October 1985
Clay

Spain
3

			1	2	3	4	5
1	(Japan) (Spain)	Shozo Shiraishi; Sergio Casal	6; 4	5; 7	3; 6	3; 6
2	(Japan) (Spain)	Tsuyoshi Fukui; Emilio Sánchez	5; 7	1; 6	1; 6
3	(Japan) (Spain)	Eiji Takeuchi / Toru Yonezawa; Sergio Casal / Emilio Sánchez	3; 6	3; 6	4; 6
4	(Japan) (Spain)	Tsuyoshi Fukui; Sergio Casal						not played
5	(Japan) (Spain)	Shozo Shiraishi; Emilio Sánchez						not played

=== Argentina vs. Soviet Union ===
Argentina
2
Buenos Aires Lawn Tennis Club, Buenos Aires, Argentina
4–6 October 1985
Clay

Soviet Union
3

			1	2	3	4	5
1	(Argentina) (Soviet Union)	Martín Jaite; Andrei Chesnokov	0; 6	4; 6	2; 6
2	(Argentina) (Soviet Union)	José Luis Clerc; Alexander Zverev	6; 4	2; 6	6; 3	3; 6	7; 5
3	(Argentina) (Soviet Union)	José Luis Clerc / Martín Jaite; Sergey Leonyuk / Alexander Zverev	4; 6	6; 1	7; 9	3; 6
4	(Argentina) (Soviet Union)	Martín Jaite; Alexander Zverev	6; 4	3; 6	6; 2	6; 2
5	(Argentina) (Soviet Union)	José Luis Clerc; Andrei Chesnokov	6; 2	6; 1	2; 6	4; 6	2; 6

=== Yugoslavia vs. France ===
Yugoslavia
4
Pionir Hall, Belgrade, Yugoslavia
4–6 October 1985
Hard (indoors)

France
1

			1	2	3	4	5
1	(Socialist Federal Republic of Yugoslavia) (France)	Goran Prpić; Yannick Noah	6; 3	4; 6	6; 1	6; 4
2	(Socialist Federal Republic of Yugoslavia) (France)	Slobodan Živojinović; Henri Leconte	4; 6	7; 5	6; 1	6; 2
3	(Socialist Federal Republic of Yugoslavia) (France)	Goran Prpić / Slobodan Živojinović; Henri Leconte / Yannick Noah	4; 6	4; 6	1; 6
4	(Socialist Federal Republic of Yugoslavia) (France)	Slobodan Živojinović; Yannick Noah	6; 4	6; 4	6; 4
5	(Socialist Federal Republic of Yugoslavia) (France)	Goran Prpić; Henri Leconte	8; 6	6; 8	6; 3

=== Italy vs. Chile ===
Italy
3
Tennis Club Cagliari, Cagliari, Italy
4–6 October 1985
Clay

Chile
1

			1	2	3	4	5
1	(Italy) (Chile)	Claudio Panatta; José Antonio Fernández	6; 2	7; 5	6; 1
2	(Italy) (Chile)	Francesco Cancellotti; Ricardo Acuña	3; 6	2; 6	6; 4	6; 2	5; 7
3	(Italy) (Chile)	Gianni Ocleppo / Claudio Panatta; Ricardo Acuña / Juan Pablo Queirolo	6; 4	6; 2	6; 4
4	(Italy) (Chile)	Francesco Cancellotti; José Antonio Fernández	6; 1	7; 5	6; 2
5	(Italy) (Chile)	Claudio Panatta; Ricardo Acuña						not played
