= 1985 French Open – Women's singles =

Women's singles
- 1985 French Open

Final
- Champion: (United States) Chris Evert
- Runner-up: (United States) Martina Navratilova
- Score: 6–3, 6–7^{(4–7)}, 7–5

Details
- Seeds: 16

Events
Singles	men	women		boys	girls
Doubles	men	women	mixed	boys	girls
WC Singles	men	women	quad
WC Doubles	men	women	quad
Legends	−45	45+	women
- French Open

Chris Evert defeated defending champion Martina Navratilova in a rematch of the previous year's final, 6–3, 6–7^{(4–7)}, 7–5 to win the women's singles tennis title at the 1985 French Open. It was her sixth French Open singles title and 17th major singles title overall. The final is considered one of the finest matches of the Evert–Navratilova rivalry and of the French Open's history.

This marked the French Open debut of future US Open champion Gabriela Sabatini. At 15 years, 24 days old, she reached the semifinals, the first of five semifinal appearances at the French Open.

== Seeds ==
The seeded players are listed below. Chris Evert is the champion; others show the round in which they were eliminated.

1. (United States) Martina Navratilova (finals)
2. (United States) Chris Evert (champion)
3. (Czechoslovakia) Hana Mandlíková (quarterfinals)
4. (Bulgaria) Manuela Maleeva (quarterfinals)
5. (Czechoslovakia) Helena Suková (second round)
6. (United States) Zina Garrison (second round)
7. (West Germany) Claudia Kohde-Kilsch (semifinals)
8. (Canada) Carling Bassett (fourth round)
9. (Sweden) Catarina Lindqvist (second round)
10. (United States) Bonnie Gadusek (fourth round)
11. (West Germany) Steffi Graf (fourth round)
12. (United States) Barbara Potter (first round)
13. (United States) Kathy Rinaldi (third round)
14. (Argentina) Gabriela Sabatini (semifinals)
15. (Hungary) Andrea Temesvári (first round)
16. (United States) Pam Casale (second round)

== Draw ==
=== Key ===
- Q = Qualifier
- WC = Wild card
- LL = Lucky loser
- r = Retired

=== Finals ===
Quarterfinals
1	(United States) Martina Navratilova	6	6
(Italy) Sandra Cecchini	2	2
3	(Czechoslovakia) Hana Mandlíková	4	4
7	(West Germany) Claudia Kohde-Kilsch	6	6
14	(Argentina) Gabriela Sabatini	6	1	7
4	(Bulgaria) Manuela Maleeva	3	6	5
(United States) Terry Phelps	4	0
2	(United States) Chris Evert	6	6

Semifinals
1	(United States) Martina Navratilova	6	6
7	(West Germany) Claudia Kohde-Kilsch	4	4
14	(Argentina) Gabriela Sabatini	4	1
2	(United States) Chris Evert	6	6

Finals
1	(United States) Martina Navratilova	3	7^{7}	5
2	(United States) Chris Evert	6	6^{4}	7

=== Earlier rounds ===
==== Section 1 ====
First round
1	(United States) Navratilova	6	6
(United States) Teeguarden	1	0
(United Kingdom) Wade	7^{7}	6
(United Kingdom) Gomer	6^{5}	4
(France) Tanvier	6	6
(Czechoslovakia) Skuherská	2	3
(United States) Sands	7	1	6
(Socialist Federal Republic of Yugoslavia) Šašak	5	6	3
(Italy) Reggi	6	4	6
(France) Amiach	0	6	0
(Socialist Federal Republic of Yugoslavia) Jaušovec	6	6
(United Kingdom) Croft	2	0
(Czechoslovakia) Skronská	6	2	6
(Canada) Kelesi	4	6	1
13	(United States) Rinaldi	6	6
(United States) Mochizuki	4	0

Second round
1	(United States) Navratilova	6	6
(United Kingdom) Wade	3	0
(France) Tanvier	6	6
(United States) Sands	4	4
(Italy) Reggi	6	7^{7}
(Socialist Federal Republic of Yugoslavia) Jaušovec	2	6^{5}
(Czechoslovakia) Skronská	4	0
13	(United States) Rinaldi	6	6

Third round
1	(United States) Navratilova	6	6
(France) Tanvier	0	0
(Italy) Reggi	6	6
13	(United States) Rinaldi	2	0

Fourth round
1	(United States) Navratilova	6	6
(Italy) Reggi	4	1

==== Section 2 ====
First round
(Denmark) Scheuer-Larsen	6	6
12	(United States) Potter	3	1
(United States) Herr	6	6
(Netherlands) Mesker	1	0
(United States) Horvath	6	2	6
(Romania) Ruzici	4	6	3
(West Germany) Keppeler	6	1	6
(Japan) Yanagi	4	6	2
(Italy) Cecchini	6	6
(United States) Holton	0	1
(Sweden) Karlsson	4	6	6
(United States) Holladay	6	3	1
(Switzerland) Jolissaint	7^{7}	6
(Japan) Inoue	6^{4}	2
5	(Czechoslovakia) Suková	6	6
(West Germany) Pfaff	1	2

Second round
(Denmark) Scheuer-Larsen	6	6
(United States) Herr	3	1
(United States) Horvath	7^{7}	6
(West Germany) Keppeler	6^{4}	1
(Italy) Cecchini	6	6
(Sweden) Karlsson	0	1
(Switzerland) Jolissaint	2	6	6
5	(Czechoslovakia) Suková	6	3	0

Third round
(Denmark) Scheuer-Larsen	6	4	6
(United States) Horvath	1	6	1
(Italy) Cecchini	7	5	6
(Switzerland) Jolissaint	5	7	4

Fourth round
(Denmark) Scheuer-Larsen	3	2
(Italy) Cecchini	6	6

==== Section 3 ====
First round
3	(Czechoslovakia) Mandlíková	6	7
(United States) Fernández	1	5
(United States) Burgin	7	4
(United States) Klitch	5	0	r
(United States) Raponi-Longo	6	6
(United States) Washington	4	2
Q	(Italy) Garrone	6	6
(United States) Steinmetz	1	1
(United States) Henricksson	3	6	6
(Czechoslovakia) Budařová	6	3	3
(Argentina) Villagrán	6	6
(United Kingdom) Einy	2	0
(United States) Spence	6	2	6
(Australia) Balestrat	3	6	3
9	(Sweden) Lindqvist	6	6
(Soviet Union) Savchenko	2	3

Second round
3	(Czechoslovakia) Mandlíková	2	6	7
(United States) Burgin	6	4	5
(United States) Raponi-Longo	5	2
Q	(Italy) Garrone	7	6
(United States) Henricksson	6	1	4
(Argentina) Villagrán	3	6	6
(United States) Spence	7	6
9	(Sweden) Lindqvist	5	2

Third round
3	(Czechoslovakia) Mandlíková	6	6
Q	(Italy) Garrone	3	0
(Argentina) Villagrán	0	1
(United States) Spence	6	6

Fourth round
3	(Czechoslovakia) Mandlíková	7^{8}	6
(United States) Spence	6^{6}	2

==== Section 4 ====
First round
(France) Paradis	7^{7}	3	6
15	(Hungary) Temesvári	6^{4}	6	3
(United States) Mascarin	6	7
(United Kingdom) Brown	3	5
(West Germany) Hanika	7	6
(United States) Smith	5	1
(United States) Benjamin	4	6	6
(Sweden) Jexell	6	3	0
(Bulgaria) Maleeva	6	7
Q	(United States) Tell	3	5
(United States) Spain-Short	6	5	6
(United States) Brown	1	7	3
(Brazil) Medrado	6	6
(United States) Torres	2	2
7	(West Germany) Kohde-Kilsch	6	6
(United States) Solomon	2	2

Second round
(France) Paradis	0	2
(United States) Mascarin	6	6
(West Germany) Hanika	6	6
(United States) Benjamin	0	1
(Bulgaria) Maleeva	6	6
(United States) Spain-Short	1	1
(Brazil) Medrado	4	4
7	(West Germany) Kohde-Kilsch	6	6

Third round
(United States) Mascarin	2	6	3
(West Germany) Hanika	6	0	6
(Bulgaria) Maleeva	4	3
7	(West Germany) Kohde-Kilsch	6	6

Fourth round
(West Germany) Hanika	7	0	3
7	(West Germany) Kohde-Kilsch	5	6	6

==== Section 5 ====
First round
6	(United States) Garrison	6	6
(United States) Golder	3	0
(South Africa) Fairbank	7	6
(United Kingdom) Hobbs	5	2
(France) Herreman	7	6
(Italy) Bonsignori	5	4
Q	(West Germany) Cueto	7^{8}	5	6
(Australia) Minter	6^{6}	7	3
(France) Suire	7^{7}	6
(United States) Russell	6^{4}	2
(United States) White	6	4	9
(Switzerland) Schmid	2	6	7
Q	(United States) Barg	3	6	6
(Socialist Federal Republic of Yugoslavia) Goleš	6	2	4
14	(Argentina) Sabatini	6	6
(Switzerland) Drescher	2	2

Second round
6	(United States) Garrison	6^{4}	6	11
(South Africa) Fairbank	7^{7}	2	13
WC	(France) Herreman	4	2
Q	(West Germany) Cueto	6	6
(France) Suire	0	6^{5}
(United States) White	6	7^{7}
Q	(United States) Barg	0	2
14	(Argentina) Sabatini	6	6

Third round
(South Africa) Fairbank	4	7^{13}	6
Q	(West Germany) Cueto	6	6^{11}	3
(United States) White	1	6^{2}
14	(Argentina) Sabatini	6	7^{7}

Fourth round
(South Africa) Fairbank	0	6	5
14	(Argentina) Sabatini	6	1	7

==== Section 6 ====
First round
10	(United States) Gadusek	6	6
(Brazil) Dias	3	2
(United States) Jaeger	6	7
(United States) Foltz	4	5
(Australia) Minter	6	6
(West Germany) Schropp	2	2
WC	(France) Calmette	6	7
(Argentina) Paz	4	5
Q	(Czechoslovakia) Holíková	6	6
(South Africa) Mould	2	1
WC	(France) Calleja	4	6	6
Q	(United States) Bernstein	6	3	4
(Switzerland) Jauch-Delhees	7	6
WC	(France) Etchemendy	5	3
4	(Bulgaria) Maleeva	6	6
(United States) Collins	3	3

Second round
10	(United States) Gadusek	6	6
(United States) Jaeger	1	1
(Australia) Minter	1	4
WC	(France) Calmette	6	6
Q	(Czechoslovakia) Holíková	2	6	3
WC	(France) Calleja	6	4	6
(Switzerland) Jauch-Delhees	1	2
4	(Bulgaria) Maleeva	6	6

Third round
10	(United States) Gadusek	6	6
WC	(France) Calmette	2	0
WC	(France) Calleja	0	1
4	(Bulgaria) Maleeva	6	6

Fourth round
10	(United States) Gadusek	5	3
4	(Bulgaria) Maleeva	7	6

==== Section 7 ====
First round
8	(Canada) Bassett	7^{9}	7^{7}
(West Germany) Betzner	6^{7}	6^{2}
(United States) Mundel	6	6
(United States) Rush	1	3
(United States) Nelson	6	6
WC	(France) Demongeot	2	2
Q	(West Germany) Dinu	7	7
(United States) Quinlan	5	5
(United States) Phelps	6	6
(South Africa) Uys	4	4
WC	(France) Derly	7	0	6
(United Kingdom) Durie	5	6	4
WC	(France) Tauziat	6	6^{6}	6
(United States) White	0	7^{8}	2
16	(United States) Casale	6	6
(United States) Cummings	3	1

Second round
8	(Canada) Bassett	6	6
(United States) Mundel	3	3
(United States) Nelson	6	6^{3}	2
Q	(West Germany) Dinu	4	7^{7}	6
(United States) Phelps	6	6
WC	(France) Derly	3	2
WC	(France) Tauziat	6^{3}	7^{7}	6
16	(United States) Casale	7^{7}	6^{5}	2

Third round
8	(Canada) Bassett	7	6
Q	(West Germany) Dinu	5	4
(United States) Phelps	6	4	6
WC	(France) Tauziat	3	6	2

Fourth round
8	(Canada) Bassett	6	0	2
(United States) Phelps	4	6	6

==== Section 8 ====
First round
11	(West Germany) Graf	7^{7}	6
LL	(Japan) Okagawa	6^{5}	4
(United States) Kim	6	6
(Soviet Union) Eliseenko	1	2
(West Germany) Bunge	6	6
(Peru) Vásquez	1	1
(United States) McNeil	6	6
(United States) Purdy	1	0
(Peru) Gildemeister	6	6
(United States) Leand	3	2
(Greece) Kanellopoulou	7	3	6
(United States) Nagelsen	5	6	4
(United States) Bonder	7^{7}	2	6
WC	(France) Vanier	6^{5}	6	0
Q	(Australia) Tremelling	2	1
2	(United States) Evert	6	6

Second round
11	(West Germany) Graf	6	6
(United States) Kim	0	4
(West Germany) Bunge	6	6
(United States) McNeil	1	1
(Peru) Gildemeister	3	4
(Greece) Kanellopoulou	6	6
(United States) Bonder	5	3
2	(United States) Evert	7	6

Third round
11	(West Germany) Graf	6	7^{7}
(West Germany) Bunge	1	6^{4}
(Greece) Kanellopoulou	3	5
2	(United States) Evert	6	7

Fourth round
11	(West Germany) Graf	2	3
2	(United States) Evert	6	6

== See also ==
- Evert–Navratilova rivalry

Preceded by 1984 Australian Open – Women's singles	Grand Slam women's singles	Succeeded by 1985 Wimbledon Championships – Women's singles
