= 1985 French Open – Men's singles =

Men's singles
- 1985 French Open

Final
- Champion: (Sweden) Mats Wilander
- Runner-up: (Czechoslovakia) Ivan Lendl
- Score: 3–6, 6–4, 6–2, 6–2

Details
- Draw: 128
- Seeds: 16

Events
Singles	men	women		boys	girls
Doubles	men	women	mixed	boys	girls
WC Singles	men	women	quad
WC Doubles	men	women	quad
Legends	−45	45+	women
- French Open

Mats Wilander defeated defending champion Ivan Lendl in the final, 3–6, 6–4, 6–2, 6–2 to win the men's singles tennis title at the 1985 French Open. It was his second French Open title and fourth major singles title overall.

This tournament marked the first professional appearance of future world No. 1 Thomas Muster; he would win the French Open title ten years later.

== Seeds ==
The seeded players are listed below. Mats Wilander is the champion; others show the round in which they were eliminated.

1. (United States) John McEnroe (semifinals)
2. (Czechoslovakia) Ivan Lendl (finalist)
3. (United States) Jimmy Connors (semifinals)
4. (Sweden) Mats Wilander (champion)
5. (Ecuador) Andrés Gómez (third round)
6. (Sweden) Anders Järryd (fourth round)
7. (Sweden) Joakim Nyström (quarterfinals)
8. (United States) Eliot Teltscher (second round)
9. (France) Yannick Noah (fourth round)
10. (United States) Aaron Krickstein (fourth round)
11. (Czechoslovakia) Miloslav Mečíř (third round)
12. (Sweden) Henrik Sundström (fourth round)
13. (Czechoslovakia) Tomáš Šmíd (fourth round)
14. (Sweden) Stefan Edberg (quarterfinals)
15. (United States) Brad Gilbert (first round)
16. (United States) Jimmy Arias (first round)

== Draw ==
=== Key ===
- Q = Qualifier
- WC = Wild card
- LL = Lucky loser
- r = Retired

=== Finals ===
Quarterfinals
1	(United States) John McEnroe	6	6	6	3	7
7	(Sweden) Joakim Nyström	7	2	3	6	5
4	(Sweden) Mats Wilander	6	7	6	7
(France) Henri Leconte	4	6	7	5
14	(Sweden) Stefan Edberg	4	3	6
3	(United States) Jimmy Connors	6	6	7
(Argentina) Martín Jaite	4	2	4
2	(Czechoslovakia) Ivan Lendl	6	6	6

Semifinals
1	(United States) John McEnroe	1	5	5
4	(Sweden) Mats Wilander	6	7	7
3	(United States) Jimmy Connors	2	3	1
2	(Czechoslovakia) Ivan Lendl	6	6	6

Final
4	(Sweden) Mats Wilander	3	6	6	6
2	(Czechoslovakia) Ivan Lendl	6	4	2	2

=== Section 1 ===
First round
1	(United States) J McEnroe	6	6	7
Q	(Haiti) R Agénor	0	2	5
Q	(Romania) F Segărceanu	7	6	7	6
(United States) P Annacone	5	7	6	2
(Brazil) M Hocevar	6	6	4	6
(United States) M Bauer	3	2	6	4
(Peru) P Arraya	6	1	4	6
Q	(United States) T Warneke	3	6	6	7
(United States) V Van Patten	4	6	6	3	3
(Czechoslovakia) M Vajda	6	3	4	6	6
(Hungary) B Taróczy	7	6	7
Q	(Austria) T Muster	5	3	5
(United States) M Flur	6	7	6
(Australia) M Edmondson	2	6	4
(Spain) G Urpí	3	3	1
12	(Sweden) H Sundström	6	6	6

Second round
1	(United States) J McEnroe	6	6	6
Q	(Romania) F Segărceanu	2	4	4
(Brazil) M Hocevar	6	4	7	6
Q	(United States) T Warneke	1	6	5	4
(Czechoslovakia) M Vajda	6	3	7	4	4
(Hungary) B Taróczy	4	6	6	6	6
(United States) M Flur	1	6	4	2
12	(Sweden) H Sundström	6	2	6	6

Third round
1	(United States) J McEnroe	6	6	6
(Brazil) M Hocevar	2	1	2
(Hungary) B Taróczy	3	4	7	3
12	(Sweden) H Sundström	6	6	6	6

Fourth round
1	(United States) J McEnroe	6	7	6
12	(Sweden) H Sundström	3	5	2

=== Section 2 ===
First round
15	(United States) B Gilbert	5	6	4
(Chile) H Gildemeister	7	7	6
(United Kingdom) S Shaw	6	2	6	3	6
(Socialist Federal Republic of Yugoslavia) S Živojinović	4	6	2	6	8
(Spain) J Arrese	6	3	7	6
(Brazil) G Barbosa	4	6	6	3
(Italy) L Bottazzi	6	6	5	3
(Socialist Federal Republic of Yugoslavia) M Ostoja	2	7	7	6
(Argentina) E Bengoechea	7	2	6	6	6
(Argentina) M Ingaramo	5	6	4	7	4
Q	(Australia) S Youl	5	6	6
(United States) M Leach	7	4	4
(United States) M De Palmer	5	6	6	7	6
(United States) J Brown	7	3	7	6	3
Q	(West Germany) H-D Beutel	2	6	1	0
7	(Sweden) J Nyström	6	4	6	6

Second round
(Chile) H Gildemeister	5	7	6	7
(Socialist Federal Republic of Yugoslavia) S Živojinović	7	6	3	5
(Spain) J Arrese	7	6	6
(Socialist Federal Republic of Yugoslavia) M Ostoja	5	4	2
(Argentina) E Bengoechea	6	5	6	6	5
Q	(Australia) S Youl	2	7	7	1	7
(United States) M De Palmer	6	6	6	3	4
7	(Sweden) J Nyström	3	1	7	6	6

Third round
(Chile) H Gildemeister	7	6	6
(Spain) J Arrese	5	1	2
Q	(Australia) S Youl	2	0	2
7	(Sweden) J Nyström	6	6	6

Fourth round
(Chile) H Gildemeister	6	1	1
7	(Sweden) J Nyström	7	6	6

=== Section 3 ===
First round
4	(Sweden) M Wilander	6	6	6
(France) T Tulasne	1	4	2
(United States) V Gerulaitis	3	7	1	1
(West Germany) B Becker	6	6	6	6
(Netherlands) H van Boeckel	1	6	2	6	9
WC	(France) E Winogradsky	6	3	6	4	7
LL	(Spain) E Sánchez	6	5	2	6	6
Q	(Socialist Federal Republic of Yugoslavia) G Prpić	3	7	6	1	0
(United States) M Dickson	6	2	1	6	12
Q	(Australia) D Cahill	3	6	6	2	14
Q	(West Germany) K Eberhard	6	3	7	4	2
(United States) D Cassidy	3	6	5	6	6
(United States) M Davis	4	4	6
(Argentina) R Argüello	6	6	7
Q	(Spain) A Tous	6	3	3
13	(Czechoslovakia) T Šmid	7	6	6

Second round
4	(Sweden) M Wilander	6	6	6
(West Germany) B Becker	3	2	1
(Netherlands) H van Boeckel	1	2	4
LL	(Spain) E Sánchez	6	6	6
Q	(Australia) D Cahill	6	6	6
(United States) D Cassidy	0	1	2
(Argentina) R Argüello	4	6	1	4
13	(Czechoslovakia) T Šmid	6	3	6	6

Third round
4	(Sweden) M Wilander	3	6	6	6
LL	(Spain) E Sánchez	6	4	3	3
Q	(Australia) D Cahill	2	1	1
13	(Czechoslovakia) T Šmid	6	6	6

Fourth round
4	(Sweden) M Wilander	6	6	6
13	(Czechoslovakia) T Šmid	3	4	4

=== Section 4 ===
First round
9	(France) Y Noah	6	6	7	6
(Czechoslovakia) L Pimek	7	1	5	4
(Netherlands) M Schapers	6	6	6
(New Zealand) B Derlin	4	0	4
(United States) J Lapidus	4	3	1
(Argentina) JL Clerc	6	6	6
(New Zealand) R Simpson	2	2	2
(Argentina) A Ganzábal	6	6	6
(Brazil) I Kley	5	4	6
WC	(France) P Portes	7	6	7
(France) H Leconte	7	6	6
(United States) T Wilkison	5	2	1
(West Germany) M Westphal	2	1	3
(Sweden) K Carlsson	6	6	6
(Czechoslovakia) P Složil	1	6	3	3
5	(Ecuador) A Gómez	6	3	6	6

Second round
9	(France) Y Noah	6	6	6
(Netherlands) M Schapers	1	1	4
(Argentina) JL Clerc	6	6	6
(Argentina) A Ganzábal	3	3	3
WC	(France) P Portes	2	1	3
(France) H Leconte	6	6	6
(Sweden) K Carlsson	2	4	1
5	(Ecuador) A Gómez	6	6	6

Third round
9	(France) Y Noah	6	6	6	4	8
(Argentina) JL Clerc	1	7	4	6	6
(France) H Leconte	6	6	6
5	(Ecuador) A Gómez	3	4	4

Fourth round
9	(France) Y Noah	3	3	7	6	1
(France) H Leconte	6	6	6	4	6

=== Section 5 ===
First round
6	(Sweden) A Järryd	6	6	7
(United States) S McCain	0	3	5
WC	(Australia) P McNamara	5	1	3
(Spain) J Higueras	7	6	6
(Spain) J Aguilera	6	6	7
(Paraguay) V Pecci Sr.	2	3	5
(New Zealand) C Lewis	6	3	6	7
(Israel) S Glickstein	1	6	2	5
(Sweden) S Simonsson	3	1	3
(Australia) J Frawley	6	6	6
(United States) G Holmes	6	7	4	6
(Uruguay) D Pérez	3	5	6	4
(West Germany) P Elter	3	2	2
(Switzerland) J Hlasek	6	6	6
(Italy) C Panatta	6	3	3
14	(Sweden) S Edberg	7	6	6

Second round
6	(Sweden) A Järryd	6	6	6
(Spain) J Higueras	3	4	1
(Spain) J Aguilera	4	6	6	7
(New Zealand) C Lewis	6	4	3	5
(Australia) J Frawley	1	6	3	6	6
(United States) G Holmes	6	3	6	3	2
(Switzerland) J Hlasek	2	3	4
14	(Sweden) S Edberg	6	6	6

Third round
6	(Sweden) A Järryd	6	6	6
(Spain) J Aguilera	4	2	2
(Australia) J Frawley	6	3	0
14	(Sweden) S Edberg	7	6	6

Fourth round
6	(Sweden) A Järryd	3	7	4	2
14	(Sweden) S Edberg	6	6	6	6

=== Section 6 ===
First round
16	(United States) J Arias	1	4	5
Q	(Argentina) R Saad	6	6	7
(Italy) F Cancellotti	6	6	6	3	6
(West Germany) H Schwaier	3	2	7	6	0
(France) G Forget	6	7	1	3
(Argentina) H de la Peña	7	5	6	6
(Brazil) C Motta	7	6	5	1	7
Q	(Czechoslovakia) K Nováček	5	4	7	6	5
(United Kingdom) J Lloyd	6	6	6
(Italy) G Ocleppo	3	3	1
(France) T Benhabiles	6	5	7	6	6
(United States) T Nelson	7	7	6	3	3
WC	(France) C Roger-Vasselin	4	6	6	3	4
(United States) B Willenborg	6	1	2	6	6
(West Germany) W Popp	4	1	5
3	(United States) J Connors	6	6	7

Second round
Q	(Argentina) R Saad	4	4	3
(Italy) F Cancellotti	6	6	6
(Argentina) H de la Peña	4	2	4
(Brazil) C Motta	6	6	6
(United Kingdom) J Lloyd	3	2	6
(France) T Benhabiles	6	6	7
(United States) B Willenborg	1	3	0
3	(United States) J Connors	6	6	6

Third round
(Italy) F Cancellotti	6	6	3	7
(Brazil) C Motta	3	3	6	6
(France) T Benhabiles	3	6	5	5
3	(United States) J Connors	6	4	7	7

Fourth round
(Italy) F Cancellotti	6	0	4	2
3	(United States) J Connors	3	6	6	6

=== Section 7 ===
First round
8	(United States) E Teltscher	6	6	6
Q	(Brazil) D Campos	2	3	3
Q	(Soviet Union) A Chesnokov	6	6	6
(United States) E Adams	2	2	1
(Switzerland) H Günthardt	6	6	6
(West Germany) D Keretić	0	3	4
(Ecuador) R Viver	5	6	6	6
(Australia) J Fitzgerald	7	4	2	1
(Argentina) M Jaite	7	7	6
Q	(Italy) P Canè	5	5	2
(Australia) T Allan	6	6	6
(United States) M Mitchell	0	2	3
(United States) S Meister	2	2	3
(South Africa) D Visser	6	6	6
(Czechoslovakia) J Navrátil	4	2	4
11	(Czechoslovakia) M Mečíř	6	6	6

Second round
8	(United States) E Teltscher	7	5	3	4
Q	(Soviet Union) A Chesnokov	5	7	6	6
(Switzerland) H Günthardt	1	6	6	6
(Ecuador) R Viver	6	1	1	1
(Argentina) M Jaite	6	6	6
(Australia) T Allan	4	4	3
(South Africa) D Visser	2	4	3
11	(Czechoslovakia) M Mečíř	6	6	6

Third round
Q	(Soviet Union) A Chesnokov	6	6	4	6	6
(Switzerland) H Günthardt	7	4	6	4	8
(Argentina) M Jaite	2	7	6	6
11	(Czechoslovakia) M Mečíř	6	6	3	4

Fourth round
(Switzerland) H Günthardt	1	2	3
(Argentina) M Jaite	6	6	6

=== Section 8 ===
First round
10	(United States) A Krickstein	6	4	6	6
(Spain) F Luna	1	6	4	3
(Australia) W Masur	3	2	2
(Argentina) G Vilas	6	6	6
Q	(Spain) J López-Maeso	6	6	6
(Poland) W Fibak	0	2	1
(Australia) C Limberger	3	4	4
(Australia) P McNamee	6	6	6
(Hungary) Z Kuhárszky	1	4	1
WC	(France) J Potier	6	6	6
WC	(France) J-P Fleurian	2	4	4
(United States) L Duncan	6	6	6
WC	(France) P Kuchna	6	6	5
(Sweden) J Gunnarsson	7	7	7
(South Africa) E Edwards	1	3	1
2	(Czechoslovakia) I Lendl	6	6	6

Second round
10	(United States) A Krickstein	6	3	6	6
(Argentina) G Vilas	4	6	1	3
Q	(Spain) J López-Maeso	0	0	4
(Australia) P McNamee	6	6	6
WC	(France) J Potier	6	6	6	6
(United States) L Duncan	7	1	1	0
(Sweden) J Gunnarsson	6	3	2
2	(Czechoslovakia) I Lendl	7	6	6

Third round
10	(United States) A Krickstein	7	5	1	6	6
(Australia) P McNamee	5	7	6	2	1
WC	(France) J Potier	1	2	2
2	(Czechoslovakia) I Lendl	6	6	6

Fourth round
10	(United States) A Krickstein	2	2	0
2	(Czechoslovakia) I Lendl	6	6	6

Preceded by 1984 Australian Open	Grand Slam men's singles	Succeeded by 1985 Wimbledon Championships
