= 1985 French Open – Men's doubles =

Men's doubles
- 1985 French Open

Final
- Champion: (Australia) Mark Edmondson (Australia) Kim Warwick
- Runner-up: (Israel) Shlomo Glickstein (Sweden) Hans Simonsson
- Score: 6–3, 6–4, 6–7, 6–3

Details
- Draw: 64
- Seeds: 16

Events
Singles	men	women		boys	girls
Doubles	men	women	mixed	boys	girls
WC Singles	men	women	quad
WC Doubles	men	women	quad
Legends	−45	45+	women
← 1984 ·	French Open	· 1986 →

The men's doubles tournament at the 1985 French Open was held from 27 May until 9 June 1985 on the outdoor clay courts at the Stade Roland Garros in Paris, France. Mark Edmondson and Kim Warwick won the title, defeating Shlomo Glickstein and Hans Simonsson in the final.

== Seeds ==
1. (Czechoslovakia) Pavel Složil / (Czechoslovakia) Tomáš Šmíd (first round)
2. (United States) Ken Flach / (United States) Robert Seguso (quarterfinals)
3. (France) Henri Leconte / (Australia) John Fitzgerald (third round)
4. (Sweden) Stefan Edberg / (Sweden) Anders Järryd (semifinals)
5. (Switzerland) Heinz Günthardt / (Hungary) Balázs Taróczy (third round)
6. (Sweden) Joakim Nyström / (Sweden) Mats Wilander (semifinals)
7. (United States) Paul Annacone / (South Africa) Christo van Rensburg (quarterfinals)
8. (Australia) Mark Edmondson / (Australia) Kim Warwick (champions)
9. (Australia) Broderick Dyke / (Australia) Wally Masur (first round)
10. (Paraguay) Francisco González / (United States) Matt Mitchell (quarterfinals)
11. (United States) Steve Meister / (United States) Eliot Teltscher (third round)
12. (United States) Tony Giammalva / (United States) Blaine Willenborg (quarterfinals)
13. (Brazil) Givaldo Barbosa / (Brazil) Ivan Kley (second round)
14. (United States) Vitas Gerulaitis / (New Zealand) Chris Lewis (first round)
15. (United States) Mike De Palmer / (United States) Gary Donnelly (third round)
16. (Israel) Shlomo Glickstein / (Sweden) Hans Simonsson (final)

== Draw ==
=== Key ===
- Q = Qualifier
- WC = Wild card
- LL = Lucky loser
- Alt = Alternate
- ITF = ITF entry
- PR = Protected ranking
- SR = Special ranking
- SE = Special exempt
- JE = Junior exempt
- JR = Junior Accelerator Programme entrant
- CO = College Accelerator Programme entrant
- NG = Next Gen Accelerator Program entrant
- w/o = Walkover
- r = Retired
- d = Defaulted

=== Finals ===
Quarterfinals
10	(Paraguay) Francisco González (United States) Matt Mitchell	7	3	4
8	(Australia) Mark Edmondson (Australia) Kim Warwick	5	6	6
12	(United States) Tony Giammalva (United States) Blaine Willenborg	6	2
6	(Sweden) Joakim Nyström (Sweden) Mats Wilander	7	6
7	(United States) Paul Annacone (South Africa) Christo van Rensburg	3	2
4	(Sweden) Stefan Edberg (Sweden) Anders Järryd	6	6
16	(Israel) Shlomo Glickstein (Sweden) Hans Simonsson	6	6
2	(United States) Ken Flach (United States) Robert Seguso	2	2

Semifinals
8	(Australia) Mark Edmondson (Australia) Kim Warwick	6	6	7
6	(Sweden) Joakim Nyström (Sweden) Mats Wilander	4	1	5
4	(Sweden) Stefan Edberg (Sweden) Anders Järryd	3	4	1
16	(Israel) Shlomo Glickstein (Sweden) Hans Simonsson	6	6	6

Final
8	(Australia) Mark Edmondson (Australia) Kim Warwick	6	6	6	6
16	(Israel) Shlomo Glickstein (Sweden) Hans Simonsson	3	4	7	3

=== Top half ===
==== Section 1 ====
First round
1	(Czechoslovakia) P Složil (Czechoslovakia) T Šmíd	3	7	2
(United States) M Davis (United States) C Dunk	6	5	6
(West Germany) S Hermann (West Germany) T Meinecke	6	6	6
(Australia) D Cahill (Australia) P Carter	3	7	4
(France) T Pham (France) J Vanier	2	6
(United States) C Strode (United States) C Wittus	6	7
(Italy) P Canè (Italy) S Colombo	6	4
10	(Paraguay) F González (United States) M Mitchell	1	6	7
15	(United States) M De Palmer (United States) G Donnelly	6	6
(Brazil) A Hocevar (Brazil) M Hocevar	3	2
(United States) D Cassidy (South Africa) D Tarr	3	6
(Switzerland) J Hlasek (Italy) C Panatta	6	7
(South Africa) C Honey (South Africa) C Steyn	4	2
(Australia) C Fancutt (Australia) J Frawley	6	6
(Spain) D de Miguel (Spain) A Tous	4	6	9
8	(Australia) M Edmondson (Australia) K Warwick	6	4	11

Second round
(United States) M Davis (United States) C Dunk	4	6	6
(West Germany) S Hermann (West Germany) T Meinecke	6	4	3
(United States) C Strode (United States) C Wittus	5	3
10	(Paraguay) F González (United States) M Mitchell	7	6
15	(United States) M De Palmer (United States) G Donnelly	7	1	6
(Switzerland) J Hlasek (Italy) C Panatta	6	6	4
(Australia) C Fancutt (Australia) J Frawley	6	2
8	(Australia) M Edmondson (Australia) K Warwick	7	6

Third round
(United States) M Davis (United States) C Dunk	6	7	3
10	(Paraguay) F González (United States) M Mitchell	7	5	6
15	(United States) M De Palmer (United States) G Donnelly	7	3	6
8	(Australia) M Edmondson (Australia) K Warwick	5	6	8

Quarterfinals
10	(Paraguay) F González (United States) M Mitchell	7	3	4
8	(Australia) M Edmondson (Australia) K Warwick	5	6	6

==== Section 2 ====
First round
3	(France) H Leconte (Australia) J Fitzgerald	6	6
(Argentina) M Jaite (Argentina) C Miniussi	4	3
(Sweden) S Simonsson (New Zealand) R Simpson	6	5	6
(United States) B Gottfried (United States) G Holmes	1	7	2
(Brazil) D Campos (Brazil) F Roese	2	1
(Australia) M Kratzmann (Australia) S Youl	6	6
(Brazil) J Soares (Switzerland) J Srnensky	4	2
12	(United States) T Giammalva (United States) B Willenborg	6	6
14	(United States) V Gerulaitis (New Zealand) C Lewis	2	4
(Sweden) J Gunnarsson (Denmark) M Mortensen	6	6
(Poland) W Fibak (United States) M Leach	5	6
(South Africa) E Edwards (South Africa) D Visser	7	7
(Sweden) R Båthman (Sweden) M Tideman	6	6
(France) T Benhabiles (France) P Portes	4	4
(United States) D Gitlin (United Kingdom) J Lloyd	6	3	4
6	(Sweden) J Nyström (Sweden) M Wilander	4	6	6

Second round
3	(France) H Leconte (Australia) J Fitzgerald	6	7
(Sweden) S Simonsson (New Zealand) R Simpson	3	5
(Australia) M Kratzmann (Australia) S Youl	6	3
12	(United States) T Giammalva (United States) B Willenborg	7	6
(Sweden) J Gunnarsson (Denmark) M Mortensen	7	6
(South Africa) E Edwards (South Africa) D Visser	5	4
(Sweden) R Båthman (Sweden) M Tideman	3	3
6	(Sweden) J Nyström (Sweden) M Wilander	6	6

Third round
3	(France) H Leconte (Australia) J Fitzgerald	4	4
12	(United States) T Giammalva (United States) B Willenborg	6	6
(Sweden) J Gunnarsson (Denmark) M Mortensen	3	4
6	(Sweden) J Nyström (Sweden) M Wilander	6	6

Quarterfinals
12	(United States) T Giammalva (United States) B Willenborg	6	2
6	(Sweden) J Nyström (Sweden) M Wilander	7	6

=== Bottom half ===
==== Section 3 ====
First round
7	(United States) P Annacone (South Africa) C van Rensburg	7	1	18
(Chile) H Gildemeister (Chile) B Prajoux	6	6	16
(Australia) D Graham (Australia) L Warder	6	7
(West Germany) A Maurer (West Germany) W Popp	4	6
(Chile) R Acuña (Chile) A Fillol	7	6
(United States) J Arias (United States) E Korita	6	4
(United States) M Dickson (United States) T Wilkison	3	6	6
9	(Australia) B Dyke (Australia) W Masur	6	4	2
11	(United States) S Meister (United States) E Teltscher	7	6
(United States) M Bauer (Brazil) C Motta	5	3
(United States) B Gilbert (United States) V Van Patten	4	2
(Australia) P McNamara (Australia) P McNamee	6	6
(France) L Courteau (France) G Forget	6	6
(Czechoslovakia) L Pimek (Socialist Federal Republic of Yugoslavia) S Živojinović	3	4
(Netherlands) M Schapers (Romania) F Segărceanu	6	4
4	(Sweden) S Edberg (Sweden) A Järryd	7	6

Second round
7	(United States) P Annacone (South Africa) C van Rensburg	7	6
(Australia) D Graham (Australia) L Warder	5	4
(Chile) R Acuña (Chile) A Fillol	7	4	2
(United States) M Dickson (United States) T Wilkison	6	6	6
11	(United States) S Meister (United States) E Teltscher	6	1	6
(Australia) P McNamara (Australia) P McNamee	1	6	3
(France) L Courteau (France) G Forget	1	3
4	(Sweden) S Edberg (Sweden) A Järryd	6	6

Third round
7	(United States) P Annacone (South Africa) C van Rensburg	7	6	7
(United States) M Dickson (United States) T Wilkison	6	7	5
11	(United States) S Meister (United States) E Teltscher	6	3
4	(Sweden) S Edberg (Sweden) A Järryd	7	6

Quarterfinals
7	(United States) P Annacone (South Africa) C van Rensburg	3	2
4	(Sweden) S Edberg (Sweden) A Järryd	6	6

==== Section 4 ====
First round
5	(Switzerland) H Günthardt (Hungary) B Taróczy	6	6
(Spain) S Casal (Spain) E Sánchez	3	3
(New Zealand) K Evernden (South Africa) M Robertson	0	2
(United States) M Flur (United States) S McCain	6	6
(Switzerland) M Günthardt (Switzerland) Z Kuharszky	6	3	2
(Argentina) JL Clerc (Romania) I Năstase	3	6	6
(France) JP Fleurian (France) E Winogradsky	6	4
16	(Israel) S Glickstein (Sweden) H Simonsson	7	6
13	(Brazil) G Barbosa (Brazil) I Kley	6	6
(France) J Potier (France) T Tulasne	3	3
(Peru) P Arraya (Socialist Federal Republic of Yugoslavia) M Ostoja	1	3
(New Zealand) D Mustard (United Kingdom) J Smith	6	6
(United Kingdom) C Dowdeswell (United States) B Levine	7	6
(Argentina) E Bengoechea (Australia) P Johnston	5	1
(United States) E Adams (Czechoslovakia) S Birner	5	1
2	(United States) K Flach (United States) R Seguso	7	6

Second round
5	(Switzerland) H Günthardt (Hungary) B Taróczy	6	6
(United States) M Flur (United States) S McCain	4	1
(Argentina) JL Clerc (Romania) I Năstase	1	4
16	(Israel) S Glickstein (Sweden) H Simonsson	6	6
13	(Brazil) G Barbosa (Brazil) I Kley	6	3
(New Zealand) D Mustard (United Kingdom) J Smith	7	6
(United Kingdom) C Dowdeswell (United States) B Levine	6	6
2	(United States) K Flach (United States) R Seguso	3	2

Third round
5	(Switzerland) H Günthardt (Hungary) B Taróczy	7	4	4
16	(Israel) S Glickstein (Sweden) H Simonsson	6	6	6
(New Zealand) D Mustard (United Kingdom) J Smith	3	3
2	(United States) K Flach (United States) R Seguso	6	6

Quarterfinals
16	(Israel) S Glickstein (Sweden) H Simonsson	6	6
2	(United States) K Flach (United States) R Seguso	2	2
