= Stefan Hermann =

German tennis player (born 1959)

- Full name: Stefan Hermann
- Country (sports): West Germany
- Born: 13 December 1959 (age 66) Münster, West Germany
- Plays: Right-handed

Singles
- Career record: 1–1
- Career titles: 0
- Highest ranking: No. 209 (16 July 1984)

Doubles
- Career record: 6–15
- Career titles: 0
- Highest ranking: No. 96 (22 April 1985)

Grand Slam doubles results
- French Open: 2R (1985)
- Wimbledon: 1R (1985)

Mixed doubles

Grand Slam mixed doubles results
- French Open: 2R (1985)
- Wimbledon: 1R (1985)

Stefan Hermann (born 13 December 1959) is a former professional tennis player from Germany.

== Biography ==
=== Tennis career ===
Hermann was a semi-finalist at the Neu-Ulm Challenger tournament in 1983, with wins over José López-Maeso, Ulrich Pinner and Balázs Taróczy. He made one main draw appearance on the Grand Prix circuit, at the Suisse Open Gstaad in 1984. In the first round he beat world number 30 and sixth seed Mel Purcell, then lost in second round to Brian Teacher.

It was in doubles that Hermann played most of his tennis and he won two Challenger titles, both in 1984, at Bielefeld and Neu-Ulm. In 1985 he partnered with Tore Meinecke and made the semi-finals of a Grand Prix event in Nice, as well as making the main draw at the French Open and Wimbledon Championships.

=== Personal life ===
Now based in Santa Barbara, California, Hermann is a self described social entrepreneur who is involved in youth mentoring. It was in that capacity he appeared on an episode of Oprah's Lifeclass in 2013.

He has 3 children with his ex-wife, and is stepfather to 3 Children with his wife Sindhi.

== Challenger titles ==
=== Doubles: (2) ===
No.	Year	Tournament	Surface	Partner	Opponents	Score
1.	1984	Bielefeld, West Germany	Clay	(West Germany) Peter Elter	(Netherlands) Huub van Boeckel (Belgium) Jan Vanlangendonck	6–4, 6–4
2.	1984	Neu-Ulm, West Germany	Clay	(South Africa) Brian Levine	(Brazil) Eduardo Oncins (Brazil) Fernando Roese	6–4, 7–5
