= List of Russia Fed Cup team representatives =

This is a list of tennis players who have represented the Russia Fed Cup team in an official Fed Cup match. Russia have taken part in the competition since 1968. Until 1991, Russian players represented the Soviet Union.

== Players ==
Player	W-L (Total)	W-L (Singles)	W-L (Doubles)	Ties	Debut
Ekaterina Alexandrova	2 – 0	2 – 0	-	1	2020
Galina Baksheeva	4 – 2	2 – 1	2 – 1	3	1968
Anna Blinkova	2 – 1	0 – 1	2 – 0	2	2017
Elena Bovina	5 – 2	3 – 1	2 – 1	6	2001
Elena Brioukhovets	1 – 1	1 – 1	-	2	1991
Anna Chakvetadze	7 – 3	7 – 2	0 – 1	8	2006
Natasha Chmyreva	9 – 3	5 – 2	4 – 1	7	1978
Elena Dementieva	26 – 9	22 – 5	4 – 4	18	1999
Vitalia Diatchenko	1 – 0	-	1 – 0	1	2015
Anna Dmitrieva	3 – 2	2 – 1	1 – 1	3	1968
Vera Dushevina	2 – 1	0 – 1	2 – 0	3	2005
Natalia Egorova	6 – 2	5 – 1	1 – 1	8	1985
Elena Eliseenko	9 – 5	2 – 4	7 – 1	14	1978
Margarita Gasparyan	0 – 3	0 – 2	0 – 1	2	2013
Olga Ivanova	2 – 0	1 – 0	1 – 0	1	1995
Anna Kalinskaya	2 – 2	0 – 1	2 – 1	3	2017
Victoria Kan	0 – 1	0 – 1	-	1	2014
Daria Kasatkina	4 – 2	2 – 1	2 – 1	3	2016
Julia Kashevarova	1 – 0	-	1 – 0	1	1980
Irina Khromacheva	0 – 4	0 – 2	0 – 2	2	2013
Maria Kirilenko	3 – 4	2 – 3	1 – 1	4	2006
Alisa Kleybanova	3 – 2	2 – 2	1 – 0	3	2009
Svetlana Komleva	4 – 1	3 – 0	1 – 1	4	2000
Anna Kournikova	12 – 7	2 – 5	10 – 2	12	1996
Lina Krasnoroutskaya	0 – 1	0 – 1	-	1	2001
Veronika Kudermetova	0 – 4	0 – 3	0 – 1	2	2014
Alla Kudryavtseva	0 – 2	0 – 1	0 – 1	1	2010
Evgenia Kulikovskaya	0 – 2	-	0 – 2	2	1997
Svetlana Kuznetsova	27 – 13	21 – 11	6 – 2	19	2004
Elena Likhovtseva	26 – 16	12 – 11	14 – 5	29	1995
Julia Lutrova	2 – 0	-	2 – 0	2	1994
Ekaterina Makarova	11 – 5	6 – 5	5 – 0	9	2008
Elena Makarova	26 – 12	15 – 6	11 – 6	25	1992
Ludmila Makarova	2 – 1	0 – 1	2 – 0	3	1982
Eugenia Maniokova	8 – 12	5 – 7	3 – 5	14	1992
Natalia Medvedeva	1 – 0	-	1 – 0	1	1991
Leila Meskhi	1 – 4	1 – 4	-	5	1989
Olga Morozova	12 – 4	8 – 3	4 – 1	12	1968
Anastasia Myskina	18 – 6	14 – 5	4 – 1	11	1998
Alexandra Panova	0 – 1	0 – 1	-	1	2013
Tatiana Panova	12 – 3	9 – 2	3 – 1	8	1994
Svetlana Parkhomenko	22 – 9	2 – 3	20 – 6	27	1981
Anastasia Pavlyuchenkova	10 – 11	5 – 9	5 – 2	11	2009
Nadia Petrova	10 – 6	4 – 4	6 – 2	12	2001
Elena Pogorelova	0 – 1	-	0 – 1	1	1992
Anastasia Potapova	0 – 1	0 – 1	-	1	2018
Natasha Reva	2 – 1	1 – 1	1 – 0	2	1984
Dinara Safina	5 – 2	0 – 2	5 – 0	5	2005
Julia Salnikova	6 – 2	5 – 1	1 – 1	7	1980
Larisa Neiland	40 – 11	17 – 8	23 – 3	32	1983
Maria Sharapova	7 – 1	7 – 1	-	5	2008
Irina Shevchenko	2 – 0	1 – 0	1 – 0	2	1979
Valeriya Solovyeva	1 – 1	-	1 – 1	2	2014
Ekaterina Sysoeva	1 – 3	1 – 1	0 – 2	3	1997
Elena Vesnina	14 – 8	3 – 3	11 – 5	17	2006
Natalia Vikhlyantseva	3 – 1	2 – 1	1 – 0	3	2017
Olga Zaitseva	9 – 8	1 – 6	8 – 2	13	1979
Natasha Zvereva	24 – 10	11 – 9	13 – 1	22	1986
Vera Zvonareva	8 – 2	7 – 2	1 – 0	8	2003
