= Tennis at the 1981 Summer Universiade =

Tennis events were contested at the 1981 Summer Universiade in Bucharest, Romania.

== Medal summary ==
Event	Gold	Silver	Bronze
Men's singles	Florin Segărceanu (ROU)	Vadim Borisov (URS)	Andrei Dîrzu (ROU)
Men's doubles	Andrei Dîrzu and Florin Segărceanu (ROU)	Angelo Binaghi and Raimondo Ricci Bitti (ITA)	Vadim Borisov and Sergi Leonyuk (URS)
Women's singles	Virginia Ruzici (ROU)	Lucia Romanov (ROU)	Kelly Henry (USA)
Women's doubles	Florența Mihai and Virginia Ruzici (ROU)	Fumiko Furuhashi and Masako Yanagi (JPN)	Yelena Gizhiyang and Ludmila Makarova (URS)
Mixed doubles	Virginia Ruzici and Florin Segărceanu (ROU)	Ludmila Makarova and Sergi Leonyuk (URS)	Kim Su-Ok and Jeon Yeong-Dae (KOR)

== Medal table ==
Rank	Nation	Gold	Silver	Bronze	Total
1	Romania (ROU)	5	1	1	7
2	Soviet Union (URS)	0	2	2	4
3	Italy (ITA)	0	1	0	1
3	Japan (JPN)	0	1	0	1
5	South Korea (KOR)	0	0	1	1
5	United States (USA)	0	0	1	1
Totals (6 entries)		5	5	5	15

== See also ==
- Tennis at the Summer Universiade
