= Tennis at the 1985 Summer Universiade =

Tennis events were contested at the 1985 Summer Universiade in Kobe, Japan.

== Medal summary ==
Event	Gold	Silver	Bronze
Men's Singles	Alexander Zverev (URS)	Florin Segărceanu (ROU)	Kim Bong-soo (KOR)
Men's Doubles	Sergi Leonyuk and Alexander Zverev (URS)	Rick Leach and Tim Pawsat (USA)	Andrei Dîrzu and Florin Segărceanu (ROU)
Women's Singles	Larisa Savchenko (URS)	Gretchen Rush (USA)	Marilda Julia Sanchez (PUR)
Women's Doubles	Svetlana Parkhomenko and Larisa Savchenko (URS)	Elizabeth Jones and Joy Tacon (GBR)	Ann Hulbert and Gretchen Rush (USA)
Mixed Doubles	Daniela Moise and Florin Segărceanu (ROU)	Larisa Savchenko and Sergi Leonyuk (URS)	Lee Jeong-Sun and Jin-Seon Yoo (KOR)

== Medal table ==
Rank	Nation	Gold	Silver	Bronze	Total
1	Soviet Union (URS)	4	1	0	5
2	Romania (ROU)	1	1	1	3
3	United States (USA)	0	2	1	3
4	Great Britain (GBR)	0	1	0	1
5	South Korea (KOR)	0	0	2	2
6	Puerto Rico (PUR)	0	0	1	1
Totals (6 entries)		5	5	5	15

== See also ==
- Tennis at the Summer Universiade
