= 1985 French Open – Women's doubles =

Women's doubles
- 1985 French Open

Final
- Champion: (United States) Martina Navratilova (United States) Pam Shriver
- Runner-up: (West Germany) Claudia Kohde-Kilsch (Czechoslovakia) Helena Suková
- Score: 4–6, 6–2, 6–2

Details
- Draw: 64
- Seeds: 16

Events
Singles	men	women		boys	girls
Doubles	men	women	mixed	boys	girls
WC Singles	men	women	quad
WC Doubles	men	women	quad
Legends	−45	45+	women
- French Open

Martina Navratilova and Pam Shriver were the defending champions and successfully defended their title, defeating Claudia Kohde-Kilsch and Helena Suková in the final 4–6, 6–2, 6–2. This was their 8th successive Grand Slam title in women's doubles.

== Seeds ==
1. (United States) Martina Navratilova / (United States) Pam Shriver (champions)
2. (West Germany) Claudia Kohde-Kilsch / (Czechoslovakia) Helena Suková (final)
3. (South Africa) Rosalyn Fairbank / (United Kingdom) Anne Hobbs (third round)
4. (West Germany) Bettina Bunge / (West Germany) Eva Pfaff (quarterfinals)
5. (Canada) Carling Bassett / (France) Catherine Tanvier (first round)
6. (United States) Betsy Nagelsen / (United States) Anne White (semifinals)
7. (United States) Kathy Horvath / (Romania) Virginia Ruzici (third round)
8. (Switzerland) Christiane Jolissaint / (Netherlands) Marcella Mesker (first round)
9. (Czechoslovakia) Hana Mandlíková / (United States) Anne Smith (third round)
10. (South Africa) Beverly Mould / (United States) Paula Smith (third round)
11. (United States) Chris Evert-Lloyd / (France) Pascale Paradis (quarterfinals)
12. (United States) Elise Burgin / (Hungary) Andrea Temesvári (semifinals)
13. (United States) Sandy Collins / (United States) Andrea Leand (third round)
14. (United States) Ann Henricksson / (United States) Barbara Jordan (first round)
15. (Australia) Anne Minter / (Australia) Elizabeth Minter (second round)
16. (United States) Terry Holladay / (Socialist Federal Republic of Yugoslavia) Mima Jaušovec (second round)

== Draw ==
Key

- Q = Qualifier
- WC = Wild card
- LL = Lucky loser
- Alt = Alternate
- ITF = ITF entry
- PR = Protected ranking
- SR = Special ranking
- SE = Special exempt
- JE = Junior exempt
- JR = Junior Accelerator Programme entrant
- CO = College Accelerator Programme entrant
- NG = Next Gen Accelerator Program entrant
- w/o = Walkover
- r = Retired
- d = Defaulted

=== Finals ===
Quarterfinals
1	(United States) Martina Navratilova (United States) Pam Shriver	6	6
11	(United States) Chris Evert-Lloyd (France) Pascale Paradis	3	3
4	(West Germany) Bettina Bunge (West Germany) Eva Pfaff	1	2
6	(United States) Betsy Nagelsen (United States) Anne White	6	6
(Czechoslovakia) Andrea Holíková (Czechoslovakia) Kateřina Skronská	4	4
12	(United States) Elise Burgin (Hungary) Andrea Temesvári	6	6
(United States) Penny Barg (Argentina) Adriana Villagrán	2	1
2	(West Germany) Claudia Kohde-Kilsch (Czechoslovakia) Helena Suková	6	6

Semifinals
1	(United States) Martina Navratilova (United States) Pam Shriver	6	6
6	(United States) Betsy Nagelsen (United States) Anne White	3	4
12	(United States) Elise Burgin (Hungary) Andrea Temesvári	4	5
2	(West Germany) Claudia Kohde-Kilsch (Czechoslovakia) Helena Suková	6	7

Final
1	(United States) Martina Navratilova (United States) Pam Shriver	4	6	6
2	(West Germany) Claudia Kohde-Kilsch (Czechoslovakia) Helena Suková	6	2	2

=== Top half ===
==== Section 1 ====
First round
1	(United States) M Navratilova (United States) P Shriver	6	6
(United States) K McDaniel (United States) W White	1	1
(Brazil) S Campos (Brazil) L Corsato	1	6	8
(United States) H Crowe (United States) K Steinmetz	6	4	7
(United Kingdom) A Croft (United States) G Purdy	2	5
(Switzerland) L Drescher (Japan) E Inoue	6	7
(United States) T Mochizuki (United States) S Rimes	4	4
13	(United States) S Collins (United States) A Leand	6	6
11	(United States) C Evert-Lloyd (France) P Paradis	6	6
(France) I Demongeot (France) N Tauziat	4	2
(United Kingdom) A Brown (South Africa) R Uys	1	2
(Italy) P Murgo (Italy) B Romanò	6	6
(United Kingdom) S Gomer (Canada) H Pelletier	2	1
(Soviet Union) E Eliseenko (Soviet Union) L Savchenko	6	6
(Australia) A Gulley (Socialist Federal Republic of Yugoslavia) R Šašak	5	1
7	(United States) K Horvath (Romania) V Ruzici	7	6

Second round
1	(United States) M Navratilova (United States) P Shriver	6	6
(Brazil) S Campos (Brazil) L Corsato	3	1
(Switzerland) L Drescher (Japan) E Inoue	3	6	6
13	(United States) S Collins (United States) A Leand	6	3	8
11	(United States) C Evert-Lloyd (France) P Paradis	6	6
(Italy) P Murgo (Italy) B Romanò	4	3
(Soviet Union) E Eliseenko (Soviet Union) L Savchenko	5	6	4
7	(United States) K Horvath (Romania) V Ruzici	7	4	6

Third round
1	(United States) M Navratilova (United States) P Shriver	6	6	3
13	(United States) S Collins (United States) A Leand	1	0
11	(United States) C Evert-Lloyd (France) P Paradis	4	6	6
7	(United States) K Horvath (Romania) V Ruzici	6	1	3

Quarterfinals
1	(United States) M Navratilova (United States) P Shriver	6	6
11	(United States) C Evert-Lloyd (France) P Paradis	3	3

==== Section 2 ====
First round
4	(West Germany) B Bunge (West Germany) E Pfaff	6	6
(United States) K Kinney (Australia) P Whytcross	3	2
(Australia) B Remilton (Japan) N Sato	3	5
(Canada) J Hetherington (United States) G Rush	6	7
(United States) L Bonder (United States) S Mascarin	7	2	2
(Italy) S Cecchini (Peru) L Gildemeister	6^{4}	6	6
(Switzerland) P Jauch-Delhees (West Germany) M Schropp	7	2	4
16	(United States) T Holladay (Socialist Federal Republic of Yugoslavia) M Jaušovec	6^{7}	6	6
9	(Czechoslovakia) H Mandlíková (United States) A Smith	6	6
(Brazil) N Dias (Greece) A Kanellopoulou	3	1
(United States) B Gadusek (Sweden) C Lindqvist	6	6
(United States) C Benjamin (United States) J Kaplan	3	3
(United States) L McNeil (United States) K Sands	4	6	6
(United States) E Raponi-Longo (Italy) R Reggi	6	3	4
(United States) Z Garrison (United States) K Rinaldi	6	3	4
6	(United States) B Nagelsen (United States) A White	2	6	6

Second round
4	(West Germany) B Bunge (West Germany) E Pfaff	6	6
(Canada) J Hetherington (United States) G Rush	1	3
(Italy) S Cecchini (Peru) L Gildemeister	6	6
16	(United States) T Holladay (Socialist Federal Republic of Yugoslavia) M Jaušovec	4	3
9	(Czechoslovakia) H Mandlíková (United States) A Smith	7	6
(United States) B Gadusek (Sweden) C Lindqvist	5	4
(United States) L McNeil (United States) K Sands	3	7	3
6	(United States) B Nagelsen (United States) A White	6	5	6

Third round
4	(West Germany) B Bunge (West Germany) E Pfaff	4	6	6
(Italy) S Cecchini (Peru) L Gildemeister	6	0	4
9	(Czechoslovakia) H Mandlíková (United States) A Smith	2	4
6	(United States) B Nagelsen (United States) A White	6	6

Quarterfinals
4	(West Germany) B Bunge (West Germany) E Pfaff	1	2
6	(United States) B Nagelsen (United States) A White	6	6

=== Bottom half ===
==== Section 3 ====
First round
5	(Canada) C Bassett (France) C Tanvier	6^{5}	0
(United States) B Herr (United States) T Phelps	7	6
(France) C Suire (United Kingdom) V Wade	7	6
(France) C Calmette (France) E Derly	5	1
(Romania) L Romanov (United States) D Spence	3	1
(Czechoslovakia) A Holíková (Czechoslovakia) K Skronská	6	6
(France) S Amiach (France) C Vanier	3	3
15	(Australia) A Minter (Australia) E Minter	6	6
12	(United States) E Burgin (Hungary) A Temesvári	7	6
(France) P Etchemendy (France) N Herreman	6^{4}	3
(Bulgaria) K Maleeva (Bulgaria) M Maleeva	6	6
(United States) H Manset (Peru) P Vásquez	1	0
(United States) P Casale (Socialist Federal Republic of Yugoslavia) S Goleš	7	6
(Brazil) P Medrado (Brazil) C Monteiro	5	0
(United States) J Golder (United States) V Nelson	0	3
3	(South Africa) R Fairbank (United Kingdom) A Hobbs	6	6

Second round
(United States) B Herr (United States) T Phelps	4	2
(France) C Suire (United Kingdom) V Wade	6	6
(Czechoslovakia) A Holíková (Czechoslovakia) K Skronská	6	7
15	(Australia) A Minter (Australia) E Minter	4	6^{1}
12	(United States) E Burgin (Hungary) A Temesvári	6	6
(Bulgaria) K Maleeva (Bulgaria) M Maleeva	4	2
(United States) P Casale (Socialist Federal Republic of Yugoslavia) S Goleš	6^{7}	4
3	(South Africa) R Fairbank (United Kingdom) A Hobbs	7	6

Third round
(France) C Suire (United Kingdom) V Wade	6	3	9
(Czechoslovakia) A Holíková (Czechoslovakia) K Skronská	3	6	11
12	(United States) E Burgin (Hungary) A Temesvári	4	7	6
3	(South Africa) R Fairbank (United Kingdom) A Hobbs	6	5	3

Quarterfinals
(Czechoslovakia) A Holíková (Czechoslovakia) K Skronská	4	4
12	(United States) E Burgin (Hungary) A Temesvári	6	6

==== Section 4 ====
First round
8	(Switzerland) C Jolissaint (Netherlands) M Mesker	4	6^{3}
(Hong Kong) P Hy (Sweden) C Jexell	6	7
(Argentina) M Paz (Argentina) G Sabatini	3	3
(United States) J Mundel (United States) P Teeguarden	6	6
(United States) A Holton (United States) M Quinlan	2	2
(United States) P Barg (Argentina) A Villagrán	6	6
(Czechoslovakia) I Budařová (Czechoslovakia) M Skuherská	6	6
14	(United States) A Henricksson (United States) B Jordan	3	3
10	(South Africa) B Mould (United States) P Smith	7	6
(Poland) I Kuczyńska (New Zealand) B Perry	6^{5}	3
(United States) S Foltz (United States) R Reis	6	6
(Japan) E Okagawa (United States) S Schenck	2	3
(Sweden) C Karlsson (Denmark) T Scheuer-Larsen	4	2
(United States) R Blount (United States) D Farrell	6	6
(West Germany) S Graf (United States) J Russell	5	5
2	(West Germany) C Kohde-Kilsch (Czechoslovakia) H Suková	7	7

Second round
(Hong Kong) P Hy (Sweden) C Jexell	2	3
(United States) J Mundel (United States) P Teeguarden	6	6
(United States) P Barg (Argentina) A Villagrán	6	6
(Czechoslovakia) I Budařová (Czechoslovakia) M Skuherská	2	1
10	(South Africa) B Mould (United States) P Smith	2	6	6
(United States) S Foltz (United States) R Reis	6	3	2
(United States) R Blount (United States) D Farrell	1	0
2	(West Germany) C Kohde-Kilsch (Czechoslovakia) H Suková	6	6

Third round
(United States) J Mundel (United States) P Teeguarden	2	7	3
(United States) P Barg (Argentina) A Villagrán	6	6^{3}	6
10	(South Africa) B Mould (United States) P Smith	6^{4}	3
2	(West Germany) C Kohde-Kilsch (Czechoslovakia) H Suková	7	6

Quarterfinals
(United States) P Barg (Argentina) A Villagrán	2	1
2	(West Germany) C Kohde-Kilsch (Czechoslovakia) H Suková	6	6
