= Natalia Reva =

Russian tennis player

- Country (sports): Soviet Union
- Born: 21 August 1965 (age 59)

Singles

Grand Slam singles results
- Australian Open: Q1 (1984)
- French Open: 2R (1984)
- Wimbledon: 2R (1984)

Doubles

Grand Slam doubles results
- French Open: 1R (1984)
- Wimbledon: 2R (1984)

Grand Slam mixed doubles results
- French Open: 3R (1985)
Medal record
Friendship Games
Bronze medal – third place	1984 Katowice	Women's doubles

Natalia "Natasha" Vladimirovna Reva (Russian: Наталья "Наташа" Владимировна Рева; born 21 August 1965) is a Russian former professional tennis player.

Active on tour in the 1980s, Reva was a US Open junior doubles finalist.

In 1984 she appeared in two ties for the Soviet Federation Cup team and was a quarter-finalist at the Virginia Slims of Denver, beating Molly Van Nostrand and Anne Hobbs en route.

Reva's best performance in a grand slam tournament came at the 1985 French Open, where she made the round of 16 in mixed doubles. She also had singles win over Sandra Cecchini at Roland Garros and Pascale Paradis at Wimbledon.

== WTA Tour finals ==
=== Doubles (0-1) ===
Result	Date	Tournament	Tier	Surface	Partner	Opponents	Score
Loss	April, 1984	Taranto, Italy	$50,000	Clay	(Soviet Union) Elena Eliseenko	(Austria) Petra Huber (Socialist Federal Republic of Yugoslavia) Sabrina Goleš	3–6, 3–6

== See also ==
- List of Soviet Union Federation Cup representatives
