= Sergey Leonyuk =

- Full name: Sergey Leonyuk
- Country (sports): Soviet Union
- Born: 3 April 1960 (age 66) Minsk, Soviet Union

Singles
- Career record: 0–1
- Career titles: 0
- Highest ranking: No. 327 (10 June 1985)

Doubles
- Career record: 4–5
- Career titles: 0
- Highest ranking: No. 245 (25 May 1987)
Medal record
Representing Soviet Union
Friendship Games
Silver medal – second place	1984	Men's doubles
Summer Universiade
Gold medal – first place	1985 Kobe	Men's doubles
Silver medal – second place	1981 Bucharest	Mixed doubles
Silver medal – second place	1985 Kobe	Mixed doubles
Bronze medal – third place	1981 Bucharest	Men's doubles

Sergey Nikolayevich Leonyuk (born 3 April 1960) is a former professional tennis player from Belarus.

== Biography ==
Leonyuk was born in Minsk, the capital of the Byelorussian Soviet Socialist Republic, modern day Belarus. He represented the Soviet Union and was a nine time Soviet champion.

In 1978 he played in a Grand Prix tournament in Calcutta, India. He lost in the first round of the singles to Ramesh Krishnan and also played in the doubles draw with Igor Tihonenko.

He won a bronze medal in singles and silver medal in doubles at the Friendship Games, held in Poland in 1984, for nations that boycotted the Summer Olympics.

A regular Davis Cup representative for the Soviet Union, he appeared in 13 ties in the 1980s, including stints in the World Group. In 1985 he and Alexander Zverev came from two sets down to win a doubles match over Czechoslovakia's Tomáš Šmíd and Libor Pimek in Tbilisi.

He won one Challenger title, the Tampere Open in 1986, which he and Ģirts Dzelde won with a walkover in the final.

In the wake of the Chernobyl disaster, Leonyuk moved to Brooklyn, New York to ensure his children's safety. He brought with him a promising 15-year old junior from Minsk, Vladimir Voltchkov, who he housed and coached.

In the 1990s, Leonyuk was an assistant coach of the Russian Davis Cup team. He has also served as the tournament director of the Kremlin Cup.

== Challenger titles ==
=== Doubles: (1) ===
No.	Year	Tournament	Surface	Partner	Opponents	Score
1.	1986	Tampere, Finland	Clay	(Soviet Union) Ģirts Dzelde	(Italy) Alessandro de Minicis (Greece) George Kalovelonis	(W/O)

== See also ==
- List of Soviet Davis Cup team representatives
