= 1985 French Open – Mixed doubles =

Mixed doubles
- 1985 French Open

Final
- Champion: (Switzerland) Heinz Günthardt (United States) Martina Navratilova
- Runner-up: (United States) Paula Smith (Paraguay) Francisco González
- Score: 2–6, 6–3, 6–2

Details
- Draw: 48

Events
| Singles | men | women | | boys | girls |
| Doubles | men | women | mixed | boys | girls |
| WC Singles | men | women | quad |
| WC Doubles | men | women | quad |
| Legends | −45 | 45+ | women |
- French Open

The mixed doubles tournament at the 1985 French Open was held from 27 May until 9 June 1985 on the outdoor clay courts at the Stade Roland Garros in Paris, France. Heinz Günthardt and Martina Navratilova won the title, defeating Paula Smith and Francisco González in the final.

== Seeds ==
1. (Switzerland) Heinz Günthardt / (United States) Martina Navratilova (champions)
2. (United States) Ken Flach / (United States) Pam Shriver (second round)
3. (Poland) Wojciech Fibak / (Canada) Carling Bassett (second round)
4. (United States) Vincent Van Patten / (United States) Zina Garrison (third round)
5. (United States) Mike Bauer / (France) Catherine Tanvier (semifinals)
6. (Australia) Laurie Warder / (Australia) Anne Minter (quarterfinals)
7. (United States) Tony Giammalva / (United States) Anne Smith (third round)
8. (United States) Chris Dunk / (United States) Barbara Jordan (second round)

== Draw ==
Key

- Q = Qualifier
- WC = Wild card
- LL = Lucky loser
- Alt = Alternate
- ITF = ITF entry
- PR = Protected ranking
- SR = Special ranking
- SE = Special exempt
- JE = Junior exempt
- JR = Junior Accelerator Programme entrant
- CO = College Accelerator Programme entrant
- NG = Next Gen Accelerator Program entrant
- w/o = Walkover
- r = Retired
- d = Defaulted

=== Finals ===
Quarterfinals
1 | (Switzerland) Heinz Günthardt (United States) Martina Navratilova | 6 | 7
(Czechoslovakia) Cyril Suk (Czechoslovakia) Helena Suková | 4 | 6^{8}
(Socialist Federal Republic of Yugoslavia) Goran Prpić (Socialist Federal Republic of Yugoslavia) Sabrina Goleš | 6 | 6
6 | (Australia) Laurie Warder (Australia) Anne Minter | 4 | 4
5 | (United States) Mike Bauer (France) Catherine Tanvier | 7 | 7
(United States) Steve Meister (United States) Penny Barg | 6^{3} | 5
(Spain) Emilio Sánchez (Bulgaria) Katerina Maleeva | 6 | 1 | 4
(Paraguay) Francisco González (United States) Paula Smith | 4 | 6 | 6

Semifinals
1 | (Switzerland) Heinz Günthardt (United States) Martina Navratilova | 6 | 6
(Socialist Federal Republic of Yugoslavia) Goran Prpić (Socialist Federal Republic of Yugoslavia) Sabrina Goleš | 4 | 1
5 | (United States) Mike Bauer (France) Catherine Tanvier | 7 | 4 | 4
(Paraguay) Francisco González (United States) Paula Smith | 6^{6} | 6 | 6

Final
1 | (Switzerland) Heinz Günthardt (United States) Martina Navratilova | 2 | 6 | 6
(Paraguay) Francisco González (United States) Paula Smith | 6 | 3 | 2

=== Top half ===
==== Section 1 ====
First round
(Chile) H Gildemeister (West Germany) B Bunge | 6 | 7
(Switzerland) M Günthardt (Poland) I Kuczyńska | 3 | 6
(Brazil) I Kley (United States) P Teeguarden | 7 | 4 | 6
(United Kingdom) C Dowdeswell (Japan) E Inoue | 6 | 6 | 3
(France) G Forget (France) P Paradis | 4 | 4
(Czechoslovakia) C Suk (Czechoslovakia) H Suková | 6 | 6
(United States) G Donnelly (United States) B Herr | 6 | 6
(France) J Vanier (France) C Vanier | 4 | 4

Second round
1 | (Switzerland) H Günthardt (United States) M Navratilova | 6 | 6
(Chile) H Gildemeister (West Germany) B Bunge | 3 | 1
(Brazil) I Kley (United States) P Teeguarden | 6 | 7
13 | (West Germany) S Hermann (West Germany) E Pfaff | 1 | 6
(United Kingdom) J Feaver (United Kingdom) V Wade | 2 | 6 | 2
(Czechoslovakia) C Suk (Czechoslovakia) H Suková | 6 | 4 | 6
(United States) G Donnelly (United States) B Herr | 6 | 6 | 6
8 | (United States) C Dunk (United States) B Jordan | 7 | 3 | 4

Third round
1 | (Switzerland) H Günthardt (United States) M Navratilova | 6 | 6
(Brazil) I Kley (United States) P Teeguarden | 3 | 1
(Czechoslovakia) C Suk (Czechoslovakia) H Suková | w/o
(United States) G Donnelly (United States) B Herr

Quarterfinals
1 | (Switzerland) H Günthardt (United States) M Navratilova | 6 | 7
(Czechoslovakia) C Suk (Czechoslovakia) H Suková | 4 | 6^{8}

==== Section 2 ====
First round
(United States) C Strode (United States) C Benjamin | 6 | 6 | 6
(France) T Benhabiles (France) MC Calleja | 2 | 7 | 4
(Socialist Federal Republic of Yugoslavia) G Prpić (Socialist Federal Republic of Yugoslavia) S Goleš | 7 | 6
(Socialist Federal Republic of Yugoslavia) M Ostoja (Socialist Federal Republic of Yugoslavia) M Jaušovec | 6 | 2
(Sweden) M Tideman (Sweden) C Lindqvist | 6 | 6 | 6
(South Africa) C van Rensburg (South Africa) E Reinach | 3 | 7 | 4
(Brazil) M Hocevar (Brazil) N Dias | 6 | 3 | 7
(France) JP Fleurian (France) C Calmette | 2 | 6 | 5

Second round
4 | (United States) V Van Patten (United States) Zina Garrison | 6 | 6
(United States) C Strode (United States) C Benjamin | 4 | 4
(Socialist Federal Republic of Yugoslavia) G Prpić (Socialist Federal Republic of Yugoslavia) S Goleš | 6 | 6
(Argentina) E Bengoechea (United States) E Raponi-Longo | 4 | 1
(Soviet Union) A Chesnokov (Soviet Union) N Reva | 6 | 6
(Sweden) M Tideman (Sweden) C Lindqvist | 4 | 1
(Brazil) M Hocevar (Brazil) N Dias | 6 | 4
6 | (Australia) L Warder (Australia) A Minter | 7 | 6

Third round
4 | (United States) V Van Patten (United States) Zina Garrison | 5 | 3
(Socialist Federal Republic of Yugoslavia) G Prpić (Socialist Federal Republic of Yugoslavia) S Goleš | 7 | 6
(Soviet Union) A Chesnokov (Soviet Union) N Reva | 1 | 0
6 | (Australia) L Warder (Australia) A Minter | 6 | 6

Quarterfinals
(Socialist Federal Republic of Yugoslavia) G Prpić (Socialist Federal Republic of Yugoslavia) S Goleš | 6 | 6
6 | (Australia) L Warder (Australia) A Minter | 4 | 4

=== Bottom half ===
==== Section 3 ====
First round
(Brazil) G Barbosa (Brazil) P Medrado | 6 | 6
(France) T Champion (France) P Etchemendy | 1 | 4
(Brazil) C Motta (Argentina) A Villagrán | 6 | 6
(United States) M Davis (United States) S Collins | 3 | 4
(United States) S Meister (United States) P Barg | 6 | 6
(France) É Winogradsky (France) I Demongeot | 2 | 3
(Australia) D Graham (Australia) P Whytcross | 3 | 5
(Switzerland) Z Kuharszky (Switzerland) C Jolissaint | 6 | 7

Second round
5 | (United States) M Bauer (France) C Tanvier | 6 | 1 | 9
(Brazil) G Barbosa (Brazil) P Medrado | 2 | 6 | 7
(Brazil) C Motta (Argentina) A Villagrán | 6 | 4 | 6
9 | (Iran) M Bahrami (France) C Suire | 3 | 6 | 2
(South Africa) C Honey (United States) G Rush | 5 | 4
(United States) S Meister (United States) P Barg | 7 | 6
(Switzerland) Z Kuharszky (Switzerland) C Jolissaint | 6 | 6
3 | (Poland) W Fibak (Canada) C Bassett | 2 | 4

Third round
5 | (United States) M Bauer (France) C Tanvier | 3 | 6 | 6
(Brazil) C Motta (Argentina) A Villagrán | 6 | 3 | 1
(United States) S Meister (United States) P Barg | 6 | 6 | 6
(Switzerland) Z Kuharszky (Switzerland) C Jolissaint | 7 | 3 | 3

Quarterfinals
5 | (United States) M Bauer (France) C Tanvier | 7 | 7
4 | (United States) S Meister (United States) P Barg | 6^{3} | 5

==== Section 4 ====
First round
(Chile) B Prajoux (Argentina) M Paz | 4 | 5
(Czechoslovakia) M Vajda (Czechoslovakia) A Holíková | 6 | 7
(Spain) E Sánchez (Bulgaria) K Maleeva | 6 | 6 | 6
(France) P Portes (France) N Herreman | 7 | 4 | 3
(United States) M Mitchell (United States) A Leand | 6 | 7
(France) JL Haillet (France) N Phan-Thanh | 1 | 5
(Paraguay) F González (United States) P Smith | 6 | 7
(Zimbabwe) H Ismail (United States) K Sands | 4 | 5

Second round
7 | (United States) T Giammalva (United States) A Smith | 1 | 6 | 13
(Czechoslovakia) M Vajda (Czechoslovakia) A Holíková | 6 | 3 | 11
(Spain) E Sánchez (Bulgaria) K Maleeva | 6 | 3 | 6
(Australia) K Warwick (United States) E Burgin | 0 | 6 | 3
(Sweden) H Simonsson (Sweden) C Karlsson | 5 | 6 | 3
(United States) M Mitchell (United States) A Leand | 7 | 3 | 6
(Paraguay) F González (United States) P Smith | 4 | 6 | 9
2 | (United States) K Flach (United States) P Shriver | 6 | 4 | 7

Third round
7 | (United States) T Giammalva (United States) A Smith | 5 | 5
(Spain) E Sánchez (Bulgaria) K Maleeva | 7 | 7
(United States) M Mitchell (United States) A Leand | 3 | 1
(Paraguay) F González (United States) P Smith | 6 | 6

Quarterfinals
(Spain) E Sánchez (Bulgaria) K Maleeva | 6 | 1 | 4
(Paraguay) F González (United States) P Smith | 4 | 6 | 6
