= Tennis at the Friendship Games =

Tennis at the Friendship Games took place at the Baildon Katowice courts in Katowice, Poland between 20 and 26 August 1984. 4 events (2 men's and 2 women's) were contested.

== Medal summary ==
=== Men's events ===
Event	Gold	Silver	Bronze
Men's singles	Alexander Zverev (URS)	Vadim Borisov (URS)	Andrei Chesnokov (URS); Sergey Leonyuk (URS)
Men's doubles	Vadim Borisov (URS); Konstantin Pugaev (URS)	Alexander Zverev (URS); Sergey Leonyuk (URS)	Miroslav Lacek (TCH); Pavel Vojtíšek (TCH); Marián Vajda (TCH); Richard Vogel (TCH)

=== Singles semifinals and final ===
Semifinals
(Soviet Union) Alexander Zverev	6	6
(Soviet Union) Andrei Chesnokov	2	2
(Soviet Union) Vadim Borisov	6	6
(Soviet Union) Sergey Leonyuk	0	4

Final
(Soviet Union) Alexander Zverev	6	6	6
(Soviet Union) Vadim Borisov	2	7	3

=== Women's events ===
Event	Gold	Silver	Bronze
Women's singles	Elena Eliseenko (URS)	Viktoria Milvidskaya (URS)	Éva Rózsavölgyi (HUN); Julia Salnikova (URS)
Women's doubles	Elena Eliseenko (URS); Julia Salnikova (URS)	Éva Rózsavölgyi (HUN); Judit Budai (HUN)	Viktoria Milvidskaya (URS); Natalia Reva (URS); Larisa Savchenko (URS); Svetlana Cherneva (URS)

=== Singles semifinals and final ===
Semifinals
(Soviet Union) Elena Eliseenko	6	2	7
(Soviet Union) Julia Salnikova	1	6	6
(Soviet Union) Viktoria Milvidskaya	7	6	6
(Hungary) Éva Rózsavölgyi	5	7	3

Final
(Soviet Union) Elena Eliseenko	6	6
(Soviet Union) Viktoria Milvidskaya	0	4

== Medal table ==
Rank	Nation	Gold	Silver	Bronze	Total
1	Soviet Union (URS)	4	3	5	12
2	Hungary (HUN)	0	1	1	2
3	Czechoslovakia (TCH)	0	0	2	2
Totals (3 entries)		4	4	8	16

== See also ==
- Tennis at the 1984 Summer Olympics
