= 1984 Taranto Open =

- Date: 23–29 April
- Edition: 1st
- Draw: 16S / 16D
- Prize money: $50,000
- Surface: Clay / outdoor
- Location: Taranto, Italy

Champions

Singles
- (Italy) Sandra Cecchini

Doubles
- (Socialist Federal Republic of Yugoslavia) Sabrina Goleš / (Austria) Petra Huber
- Taranto Open

The 1984 Taranto Open was a women's tennis tournament played on outdoor clay courts in Taranto, Italy that was part of the 1984 Virginia Slims World Championship Series.It was the inaugural edition of the tournament and was held from 23 April until 29 April 1984. Unseeded Sandra Cecchini won the singles title and earned $9,000 first-prize money.

== Finals ==
=== Singles ===
(Italy) Sandra Cecchini defeated (Socialist Federal Republic of Yugoslavia) Sabrina Goleš 6–2, 7–5

- It was Cecchini's 1st singles title of her career.

=== Doubles ===
(Socialist Federal Republic of Yugoslavia) Sabrina Goleš / (Austria) Petra Huber defeated (Soviet Union) Elena Eliseenko / (Soviet Union) Natasha Reva 6–3, 6–3

- It was Goleš's 1st career title. It was Huber's 1st career title.
