= Andrei Dîrzu =

Romanian tennis player

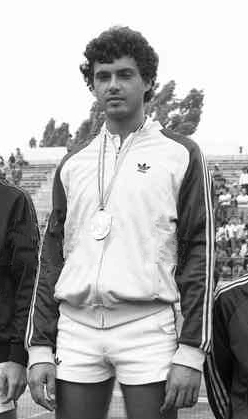
- Dîrzu at the 1981 Summer Universiade
- Born: 14 April 1959 (age 67) Bucharest, Romania
- Prize money: $5.617

Singles
- Career record: 5–11
- Highest ranking: 189 (14 July 1986)

Doubles
- Career record: 8–13
- Highest ranking: 176 (18 March 1985)
Medal record
Representing Romania
Summer Universiade
Gold medal – first place	1981 Bucharest	Doubles
Bronze medal – third place	1979 Mexico City	Singles
Bronze medal – third place	1979 Mexico City	Doubles
Bronze medal – third place	1981 Bucharest	Singles
Bronze medal – third place	1985 Kobe	Doubles

Andrei Dîrzu (born 14 April 1959) is a former Romanian tennis player who won five medals at the Summer Universiades between 1979 and 1985.
