= Ramiz Akhmerov =

Azerbaijani tennis player

Personal information
- Born: 8 March 1953 (age 73)

Sport
- Sport: Tennis
Medal record
Representing Soviet Union
Summer Universiade
Gold medal – first place	1979 Mexico City	Men's Doubles
Silver medal – second place	1979 Mexico City	Mixed Doubles
Bronze medal – third place	1977 Sofia	Mixed Doubles

Ramiz Akhmerov (born 8 March 1953) is a former tennis player from Azerbaijan who competed for the Soviet Union in the Davis Cup.

Akhmerov, who was runner-up to Alexander Zverev at the 1979 Soviet Championships, won three Summer Universiade medals. He earned a bronze medal at the 1977 event and won both a gold and silver medal at the 1979 Summer Universiade.

He made his Davis Cup debut in 1979, at Barcelona, where he lost a singles rubber to Spain's Antonio Munoz. His only other Davis Cup appearance came in Donetsk three years later. He and partner Vadim Borisov played the doubles rubber against India's Amritraj brothers, Anand and Vijay. The Soviet pairing lost the match in four sets.
