= Ludmila Makarova =

Russian tennis player

- Country (sports): Soviet Union
- Born: 26 March 1957 (age 69) Siberia, USSR

Ludmila Makarova (born 26 March 1957), also known as Luda Makarova, is a Russian former tennis player.

Makarova, trained at Moscow's Spartak Club, won two medals for the Soviet Union at the 1981 Summer Universiade in Bucharest and was a national Federation Cup player in 1982, helping the team reach the World Group quarter-finals.

Now living in San Diego, Makarova is married to microbiologist Mikhail Popkov and has two daughters. Her youngest daughter, Christina, played professional tennis. The family left Russia in the 1990s.

== See also ==
- List of Soviet Union Federation Cup representatives
