= 1985 French Open =

- Date: 27 May – 9 June 1985
- Edition: 84
- Category: 55th Grand Slam (ITF)
- Draw: 128S / 64D / 48X
- Surface: Clay / outdoor
- Location: Paris (XVI^{e}), France
- Venue: Stade Roland Garros

Champions

Men's singles
- (Sweden) Mats Wilander

Women's singles
- (United States) Chris Evert

Men's doubles
- (Australia) Mark Edmondson / (Australia) Kim Warwick

Women's doubles
- (United States) Martina Navratilova / (United States) Pam Shriver

Mixed doubles
- (United States) Martina Navratilova / (Switzerland) Heinz Günthardt
- French Open

The 1985 French Open was a tennis tournament that took place on the outdoor clay courts at the Stade Roland Garros in Paris, France. The tournament was held from 27 May until 9 June. It was the 84th staging of the French Open, and the first Grand Slam tennis event of 1985.

The event was part of the 1985 Nabisco Grand Prix and 1985 Virginia Slims World Championship Series.

== Finals ==
=== Men's singles ===
(Sweden) Mats Wilander defeated (Czechoslovakia) Ivan Lendl, 3–6, 6–4, 6–2, 6–2

- It was Wilander's 4th career Grand Slam title, and his 2nd French Open title.

=== Women's singles ===
(United States) Chris Evert defeated (United States) Martina Navratilova, 6–3, 6–7^{(4–7)}, 7–5

- It was Evert's 17th career Grand Slam title, and her 6th French Open title.

=== Men's doubles ===
(Australia) Mark Edmondson / (Australia) Kim Warwick defeated (Israel) Schlomo Glickstein / (Sweden) Hans Simonsson, 6–3, 6–4, 6–7, 6–3

=== Women's doubles ===
(United States) Martina Navratilova / (United States) Pam Shriver defeated (West Germany) Claudia Kohde-Kilsch / (Czechoslovakia) Helena Suková, 4–6, 6–2, 6–2

=== Mixed doubles ===
(United States) Martina Navratilova / (Switzerland) Heinz Günthardt defeated (United States) Paula Smith / (Paraguay) Francisco González, 2–6, 6–3, 6–2

== Prize money ==
Event		W	F	SF	QF	4R	3R	2R	1R
Singles	Men	FF1,338,200	FF669,060	FF334,580	FF169,530	FF98,140	FF53,530	FF31,230	FF15,060
Singles	Women	FF1,262,700	FF640,500	FF315,675	FF160,125	FF78,690	FF41,175	FF21,046	FF11,437

Total prize money for the event was FF19,895,600.

Preceded by 1984 Australian Open	Grand Slams	Succeeded by 1985 Wimbledon Championships
