= Elena Eliseenko =

Soviet tennis player (born 1959)

- Country (sports): Soviet Union
- Born: 5 May 1959 (age 65)
- Prize money: $20,696

Singles

Grand Slam singles results
- French Open: 3R (1984)
- Wimbledon: 1R (1984, 1985)

Doubles

Grand Slam doubles results
- French Open: 2R (1985)
- Wimbledon: 2R (1984)
Medal record
Women's tennis
Friendship Games
| Gold medal – first place | 1984 Katowice | Women's Singles |
| Gold medal – first place | 1984 Katowice | Women's Doubles |

Elena Pavlovna Eliseenko (born 5 May 1959) is a Russian tennis player. She was a singles and doubles gold medalist at the Friendship Games, an event held for countries boycotting the 1984 Olympics.

Eliseenko represented the Soviet Union in a total of 14 Federation Cup ties, between 1978 and 1985. She featured in three quarter-finals, including a tie against Great Britain in 1981 where she took Sue Barker to three sets. During her Federation Cup career she won two of her six singles rubbers and lost only once in eight doubles rubbers.

While competing on the professional tour she appeared in the main draws of both the French Open and Wimbledon. Her best performance was a run to the third round at the 1984 French Open, as a qualifier.

== WTA Tour finals ==
=== Doubles (0-1) ===
| Result | Date | Tournament | Tier | Surface | Partner | Opponents | Score |
|---|---|---|---|---|---|---|---|
| Loss | April, 1984 | Taranto, Italy | $50,000 | Clay | (Soviet Union) Natasha Reva | (Austria) Petra Huber (Socialist Federal Republic of Yugoslavia) Sabrina Goleš | 3–6, 3–6 |

== See also ==
- List of Soviet Federation Cup team representatives
