= Konstantin Pugaev =

Soviet tennis player

- Full name: Konstantin Pavlovich Pugaev
- Country (sports): Soviet Union
- Born: 27 June 1955 (age 70)

Singles
- Career record: 6–5
- Career titles: 0
- Highest ranking: No. 281 (25 June 1984)

Grand Slam singles results
- Wimbledon: 1R (1973)

Doubles
- Career record: 1–5
- Career titles: 0
- Highest ranking: No. 237 (9 July 1984)

Grand Slam doubles results
- Wimbledon: 2R (1976)
Medal record
Representing Soviet Union
Friendship Games
Gold medal – first place	1984	Men's doubles

Konstantin Pavlovich Pugaev (born 27 June 1955) is a former professional tennis player from Russia who represented the Soviet Union.

== Biography ==
Pugaev appeared twice at the Wimbledon Championships, the first time in 1973, when he lost in the first round to Ernie Ewert in four sets and competed with Greg Perkins in the doubles. At the 1976 Wimbledon Championships he and partner Alex Metreveli made the second round of the doubles.

His Davis Cup career for the Soviet Union began in 1976, a tie against Monaco in Tbilisi. He won both matches he played, the doubles and reverse singles rubbers, as the Soviets swept the tie 5–0.

In 1980 he made the semi-finals of a Grand Prix tournament in Sofia, with wins over Hans Simonsson, Helmar Stiegler and Tenny Svensson.

Pugaev featured in three Davis Cup ties in 1981, as the Soviet Union won its way into the World Group, secured when Pugaev and Vadim Borisov won the doubles rubber of the Europe Zone B final, against the Netherlands in Yurmala.

In 1982 the Soviets began their World Group campaign against Sweden in Stockholm and Pugaev again partnered Borisov in the doubles. They lost the match in five sets to Anders Järryd and Hans Simonsson, which gave Sweden an unassailable lead in the tie, meaning the Soviets would have to play a relegation play-off. Pugaev had a win in the reverse singles over Joakim Nyström. India was the Soviet Union's opponent in the relegation play-off. The two sides met in Donetsk and Pugaev won both of his matches, singles wins over Sashi Menon and Vijay Amritraj, to help the Soviet's secure the tie 4–1.

Another World Group appearance came for Pugaev in the 1983 Davis Cup competition. Pugaev, a serve-and-volley player, took part in a tie against France in Moscow and although his side were defeated had a consolation win over Henri Leconte.

Pugaev won a gold medal in the men's doubles at the 1984 Friendship Games, partnering Vadim Borisov.

The Soviet Union lost in the opening round of the World Group again in 1985, to Czechoslovakia in Tbilisi, with Pugaev again getting a win in a dead rubber, over Libor Pimek.

== See also ==
- List of Soviet Davis Cup team representatives
