= Florin Segărceanu =

Romanian tennis player

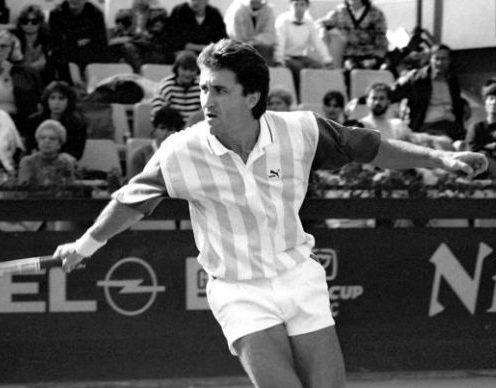
- Segărceanu in 1990
- Country (sports): Romania
- Born: 29 March 1961 (age 63); Bucharest, Romania
- Height: 1.80 m (5 ft 11 in)
- Plays: Right-handed
- Prize money: $192,212

Singles
- Career titles: 0
- Highest ranking: No. 73 (10 October 1983)

Doubles
- Career titles: 1
- Highest ranking: No. 49 (8 October 1984)
Medal record
Representing Romania
Summer Universiade
Bronze medal – third place	1979 Mexico City	Doubles
Gold medal – first place	1981 Bucharest	Singles
Gold medal – first place	1981 Bucharest	Doubles
Gold medal – first place	1981 Bucharest	Mixed doubles
Gold medal – first place	1985 Kobe	Mixed doubles
Silver medal – second place	1985 Kobe	Singles
Bronze medal – third place	1985 Kobe	Doubles

Florin Segărceanu (born 29 March 1961) is a former tennis player from Romania.

When John McEnroe won Wimbledon in 1983, Segărceanu was the only player to take a set off McEnroe throughout the entire championship when he won the first set of their second round match.

Segărceanu defeated Brian Teacher, then ranked 22nd, at Cincinnati in 1983; Paul Annacone, then ranked 25th, in the opening round at Roland Garros in 1985; Martín Jaite, then ranked 20th, at Tel Aviv in 1985; and Guy Forget, then ranked 28th, at Nice in 1986.

His career prize money total was $192,212, with 1985's being his highest earning year at $25,138.

== Career finals ==
=== Doubles (1 title, 5 runner-ups) ===
Result	W/L	Date	Tournament	Surface	Partner	Opponents	Score
Loss	0–1	Oct 1983	Basel, Switzerland	Hard (i)	(Sweden) Stefan Edberg	(Czechoslovakia) Pavel Složil (Czechoslovakia) Tomáš Šmíd	1–6, 6–3, 6–7
Win	1–1	Oct 1983	Cologne, West Germany	Hard	(United States) Nick Saviano	(United States) Paul Annacone (United States) Eric Korita	6–3, 6–4
Loss	1–2	May 1984	Munich, West Germany	Clay	(United States) Eric Fromm	(West Germany) Boris Becker (Poland) Wojciech Fibak	4–6, 6–4, 1–6
Loss	1–3	Oct 1985	Tel Aviv, Israel	Hard	(South Africa) Michael Robertson	(United States) Brad Gilbert (Romania) Ilie Năstase	3–6, 2–6
Loss	1–4	Jul 1989	Stuttgart, West Germany	Clay	(Czechoslovakia) Cyril Suk	(Czechoslovakia) Petr Korda (Czechoslovakia) Tomáš Šmíd	3–6, 4–6
Loss	1–5	Aug 1990	Prague, Czechoslovakia	Clay	(Romania) George Cosac	(Czech Republic) Vojtěch Flégl (Czech Republic) Daniel Vacek	7–5, 4–6, 3–6
