= Alexander Zverev Sr. =

Russian tennis coach & player (born 1960)

- Full name: Alexander Mikhailovich Zverev
- Country (sports): Soviet Union
- Born: 22 January 1960 (age 66) (Note: The Davis Cup and ITF websites give his birthdate as 22 June 1962, however in a News and Courier article from 1986 entitled "Charleston Tennis Classic Offers Incentive For USTA Circuit Field", he is referred to as a 26-year-old, so this biography uses his birthdate listed on the ATP website) Sochi, Russian SFSR, Soviet Union
- Height: 1.85 m (6 ft 1 in)
- Plays: Right-handed

Singles
- Career record: 3–16
- Career titles: 0
- Highest ranking: No. 175 (18 March 1985)

Grand Slam singles results
- Australian Open: 1R (1985)
- Wimbledon: 1R (1986)

Doubles
- Career record: 4–4
- Career titles: 0
- Highest ranking: No. 307 (18 March 1985)

Grand Slam mixed doubles results
- French Open: 1R (1986)
Medal record
Summer Universiade
Gold medal – first place	1985 Kobe	Singles
Gold medal – first place	1985 Kobe	Doubles
Bronze medal – third place	1983 Edmonton	Singles
Friendship Games
Gold medal – first place	1984	Singles
Silver medal – second place	1984	doubles
Goodwill Games
Gold medal – first place	1986 Moscow	Doubles

Alexander Mikhailovich Zverev (Russian: Александр Михайлович Зверев; born 22 January 1960) is a former professional tennis player from Russia who competed for the Soviet Union.

He is the father of German tennis players Alexander Zverev and Mischa Zverev.

== Career ==
In 1979, he made his first appearance for the Soviet Davis Cup team.

Zverev was a bronze medalist in the men's singles event at the 1983 Summer Universiade and won a singles gold medal at the Friendship Games, which were held in 1984. He did better than two years earlier at the 1985 Summer Universiade, winning both the singles gold medal and the doubles gold medal, partnering Sergi Leonyuk, with whom he was also a gold medalist in the 1986 Goodwill Games.

He appeared in three Grand Slam tournaments during his career. In the 1985 Australian Open he qualified for the main draw and was beaten in the opening round by Tim Wilkison. Again playing as a qualifier, Zverev met Tim Mayotte in the first round of the 1986 Wimbledon Championships and was defeated in straight sets. As a mixed doubles player he took part in the 1986 French Open with Svetlana Cherneva.

Zverev played mostly on the Challenger circuit, where he had victories over two top 50 players, Andrei Chesnokov and Jan Gunnarsson. He did however make the second round of the 1985 Geneva Open, a Grand Prix tournament.

He played his final Davis Cup tie in 1987 and retired having taken part in 36 rubbers, from which he won 18. One of those was a doubles win over the Czechoslovak pairing of Libor Pimek and Tomáš Šmíd, the latter ranked number one in the world for doubles at the time. Three time Soviet champion in men's singles and 4 time winner in men's doubles.

== Personal life ==
In 1991, Zverev and his wife, professional tennis player Irina Zvereva, relocated to Germany. They are parents to tennis players Alexander and Mischa who both represent Germany on the ATP Tour.
