= 1983 Wimbledon Championships – Women's singles qualifying =

Women's singles qualifying
- 1983 Wimbledon Championships

Events
Singles	men	women		boys	girls
Doubles	men	women	mixed	boys	girls
WC Singles	men	women	quad
WC Doubles	men	women	quad
Legends	men	women	seniors

Qualification
Singles	men	women
Doubles	men	women	mixed
- Wimbledon Championships

Players who neither had high enough rankings nor received wild cards to enter the main draw of the annual Wimbledon Tennis Championships participated in a qualifying tournament held one week before the event.

== Qualifiers ==
1. (Australia) Elizabeth Minter
2. (United States) Lisa Spain
3. (United States) Jamie Golder
4. (Australia) Nerida Gregory
5. (United States) Susan Rimes
6. (Sweden) Elisabeth Ekblom
7. (Australia) Bernadette Randall
8. (Australia) Debbie Freeman

== Lucky losers ==
1. (United States) Laura Bernstein
2. (West Germany) Myriam Schropp
3. (United States) Micki Schillig
4. (Australia) Brenda Remilton-Ward

== Qualifying draw ==
Key

- Q = Qualifier
- WC = Wild card
- LL = Lucky loser
- Alt = Alternate
- ITF = ITF entry
- PR = Protected ranking
- SR = Special ranking
- SE = Special exempt
- JE = Junior exempt
- JR = Junior Accelerator Programme entrant
- CO = College Accelerator Programme entrant
- NG = Next Gen Accelerator Program entrant
- w/o = Walkover
- r = Retired
- d = Defaulted

=== First qualifier ===
First round
1	(Socialist Federal Republic of Yugoslavia) Sabrina Goleš	7	6
8	(South Africa) Kim Seddon	6	4
4	(Republic of Ireland) Siobhán Nicholson	1	3
5	(Australia) Elizabeth Minter	6	6
2	(United Kingdom) Lorrayne Gracie	6	6
7	(United Kingdom) Nicola Lusty	3	4
3	(Belgium) Ann Gabriel	3	2
6	(West Germany) Myriam Schropp	6	6

Second round
(Socialist Federal Republic of Yugoslavia) Sabrina Goleš	2	4
(Australia) Elizabeth Minter	6	6
(United Kingdom) Lorrayne Gracie	2	3
(West Germany) Myriam Schropp	6	6

Qualifying competition
(Australia) Elizabeth Minter	6	6
(West Germany) Myriam Schropp	1	2

=== Second qualifier ===
First round
1	(Australia) Pam Whytcross	6	6
8	(United Kingdom) Catherine Berry	2	2
4	(United States) Lisa Spain	6	7
5	(United Kingdom) Glynis Coles	2	5
2	(Japan) Naoko Sato	7	6
7	(United States) Marsha Bladel	6	0
3	(Belgium) Marlene De Wouters	6	5
6	(United States) Stacy Margolin	7	7

Second round
(Australia) Pam Whytcross	3	4
(United States) Lisa Spain	6	6
(Japan) Naoko Sato	7	6
(United States) Stacy Margolin	5	3

Qualifying competition
(United States) Lisa Spain	7	7
(Japan) Naoko Sato	6	5

=== Third qualifier ===
First round
1	(South Africa) Rene Uys	6	6
8	(South Africa) Monica Reinach	2	0
4	(United Kingdom) Caroline Bhaguandas	4	4
5	(United States) Jenni Goodling	6	6
2	(United Kingdom) Susan Leach	5	3
7	(United Kingdom) Sarah Sullivan	7	6
3	(United States) Jamie Golder	3	6	6
6	(France) Pascale Paradis	6	4	1

Second round
(South Africa) Rene Uys	3	7	7
(United States) Jenni Goodling	6	5	9
(United Kingdom) Sarah Sullivan	5	1
(United States) Jamie Golder	7	6

Qualifying competition
(United States) Jenni Goodling	6	5	2
(United States) Jamie Golder	2	7	6

=== Fourth qualifier ===
First round
1	(Netherlands) Judith Warringa	3	4
8	(Australia) Nerida Gregory	6	6
4	(West Germany) Steffi Graf	6	6
5	(United Kingdom) Heidi Narborough	0	0
2	(New Zealand) Chris Newton	7	6
7	(United Kingdom) Linda Geeves	5	1
3	(United Kingdom) Valda Lake	5	3
6	(United States) Micki Schillig	7	6

Second round
(Australia) Nerida Gregory	1	6	6
(West Germany) Steffi Graf	6	3	2
(New Zealand) Chris Newton	3	4
(United States) Micki Schillig	6	6

Qualifying competition
(Australia) Nerida Gregory	1	7	6
(United States) Micki Schillig	6	6	3

=== Fifth qualifier ===
First round
1	(United States) Susan Rimes	6	6
8	(Romania) Florența Mihai	2	3
4	(United States) Sheila McInerney	7	6
5	(Australia) Tonia Bayley	5	0
2	(France) Nathalie Phan-Thanh	4	5
7	(Australia) Vicki Marler	6	7
3	(Republic of Ireland) Jennifer O'Brien	3	2
6	(Australia) Brenda Remilton-Ward	6	6

Second round
(United States) Susan Rimes	6	6
(United States) Sheila McInerney	2	0
(Australia) Vicki Marler	4	1
(Australia) Brenda Remilton-Ward	6	6

Qualifying competition
(United States) Susan Rimes	6	6
(Australia) Brenda Remilton-Ward	3	4

=== Sixth qualifier ===
First round
1	(Austria) Petra Huber	6	4	6
8	(United Kingdom) Sally Reeves	1	6	8
4	(Sweden) Carina Karlsson	6	6
5	(Australia) Janine Thompson	3	4
2	(Australia) Kim Staunton	6	6
7	(South Africa) Lynn Jacobs	2	3
3	(United Kingdom) Ellinore Lightbody	4	2
6	(Sweden) Elisabeth Ekblom	6	6

Second round
(United Kingdom) Sally Reeves	1	6	6
(Sweden) Carina Karlsson	6	3	2
(Australia) Kim Staunton	5	6	1
(Sweden) Elisabeth Ekblom	7	4	6

Qualifying competition
(United Kingdom) Sally Reeves	2	3
(Sweden) Elisabeth Ekblom	6	6

=== Seventh qualifier ===
First round
1	(Czechoslovakia) Hana Fukárková	6	6
8	(Australia) Louise Fitzgerald	3	2
4	(Australia) Bernadette Randall	6	2	6
5	(Soviet Union) Svetlana Parkhomenko	4	6	2
2	(Australia) Miranda Yates	0	1
7	(United States) Kathy Holton	6	6
3	(France) Nathalie Herreman	6	4	4
6	(United States) Laura Bernstein	4	6	6

Second round
(Czechoslovakia) Hana Fukárková	4	4
(Australia) Bernadette Randall	6	6
(United States) Kathy Holton	4	1
(United States) Laura Bernstein	6	6

Qualifying competition
(Australia) Bernadette Randall	6	6
(United States) Laura Bernstein	1	2

=== Eighth qualifier ===
First round
1	(West Germany) Petra Keppeler	6	6	4
8	(United Kingdom) Denise Parnell	3	7	6
4	(Australia) Debbie Freeman	6	6
5	(United States) Lucy Gordon	2	4
2	(United States) Margaret Redfearn	1	2
7	(Soviet Union) Larisa Neiland	6	6
3	(United Kingdom) Jo Louis	6	4	3
6	(Socialist Federal Republic of Yugoslavia) Renata Šašak	2	6	6

Second round
(United Kingdom) Denise Parnell	1	6	1
(Australia) Debbie Freeman	6	4	6
(Soviet Union) Larisa Neiland	5	7	3
(Socialist Federal Republic of Yugoslavia) Renata Šašak	7	6	6

Qualifying competition
(Australia) Debbie Freeman	6	6
(Socialist Federal Republic of Yugoslavia) Renata Šašak	4	2
