= 1984 US Open – Women's singles qualifying =

Women's singles qualifying
- 1984 US Open

Events
Singles	men	women		boys	girls
Doubles	men	women	mixed	boys	girls
WC Singles	men	women	quad
WC Doubles	men	women	quad
Legends	men	women	mixed

Qualification
Singles	men	women
- US Open

Players who neither had high enough rankings nor received wild cards to enter the main draw of the annual US Open Tennis Championships participated in a qualifying tournament held over several days before the event.

== Seeds ==
1. (West Germany) Heidi Eisterlehner (second round)
2. (Switzerland) Petra Jauch-Delhees (qualified)
3. (West Germany) Myriam Schropp (qualifying competition, lucky loser)
4. (Italy) Federica Bonsignori (second round)
5. (Japan) Masako Yanagi (qualifying competition)
6. (Japan) Emiko Okagawa (first round)
7. (United States) Anna-Maria Fernandez (second round)
8. -
9. (United States) Felicia Raschiatore (first round)
10. (Italy) Sabina Simmonds (second round)
11. (United States) Barbie Bramblett (qualified)
12. (South Africa) Rene Mentz (second round)
13. -
14. (United States) Nancy Yeargin (qualifying competition)
15. (Switzerland) Karin Stampfli (second round)
16. (United Kingdom) Julie Salmon (first round)

== Qualifiers ==
1. (Sweden) Carin Anderholm
2. (United States) Ronni Reis
3. (United States) Barbie Bramblett
4. (United States) Karin Huebner
5. (United States) Stephanie Rehe
6. (United States) Patty Fendick
7. (United States) Beverly Bowes
8. (Switzerland) Petra Jauch-Delhees

== Lucky losers ==
1. (West Germany) Myriam Schropp

== Qualifying draw ==
Key

- Q = Qualifier
- WC = Wild card
- LL = Lucky loser
- Alt = Alternate
- ITF = ITF entry
- PR = Protected ranking
- SR = Special ranking
- SE = Special exempt
- JE = Junior exempt
- JR = Junior Accelerator Programme entrant
- CO = College Accelerator Programme entrant
- NG = Next Gen Accelerator Program entrant
- w/o = Walkover
- r = Retired
- d = Defaulted

=== First qualifier ===
First round
1	(West Germany) Heidi Eisterlehner	7	7^{7}
(Japan) Kumiko Okamoto	5	6^{4}
(United Kingdom) Sally Reeves	6^{5}	0
(Sweden) Carin Anderholm	7^{7}	6
(West Germany) Isabel Cueto	6	6
(United States) Stacy Margolin	2	1
(United States) Mary-Ann Colville	3	0
14	(United States) Nancy Yeargin	6	6

Second round
1	(West Germany) Heidi Eisterlehner	1	2
(Sweden) Carin Anderholm	6	6
(West Germany) Isabel Cueto	6^{3}	5
14	(United States) Nancy Yeargin	7^{7}	7

Qualifying competition
(Sweden) Carin Anderholm	7	6
14	(United States) Nancy Yeargin	5	4

=== Second qualifier ===
First round
9	(United States) Felicia Raschiatore	2	5
(United States) Heather Crowe	6	7
(United States) Ronni Reis	7^{7}	6
(Australia) Brenda Remilton-Ward	6^{2}	2
(United States) Shawn Foltz	5	0
(Greece) Angeliki Kanellopoulou	7	6
(Australia) Nerida Gregory	6	3	4
5	(Japan) Masako Yanagi	4	6	6

Second round
(United States) Heather Crowe	6	1	2
(United States) Ronni Reis	3	6	6
(Greece) Angeliki Kanellopoulou	4	4
5	(Japan) Masako Yanagi	6	6

Qualifying competition
(United States) Ronni Reis	6	7
5	(Japan) Masako Yanagi	1	5

=== Third qualifier ===
First round
3	(West Germany) Myriam Schropp	6	6
(Brazil) Luciana Corsato-Owsianka	3	4
(Poland) Iwona Kuczyńska	6	2	4
(West Germany) Andrea Betzner	4	6	6
(United States) Helena Konanz	6	7
(Australia) Karen Smith	4	5
(Czechoslovakia) Hana Strachoňová	6^{3}	3
11	(United States) Barbie Bramblett	7^{7}	6

Second round
3	(West Germany) Myriam Schropp	6	6
(West Germany) Andrea Betzner	1	1
(United States) Helena Konanz	1	4
11	(United States) Barbie Bramblett	6	6

Qualifying competition
3	(West Germany) Myriam Schropp	6	3	4
11	(United States) Barbie Bramblett	4	6	6

=== Fourth qualifier ===
First round
12	(South Africa) Rene Mentz	6	6
(South Korea) Baek Hee-jeong	3	3
(United States) Laura Bernstein	7	6
(United States) Beth Norton	5	1
(Australia) Annette Gulley	6	2	2
(United States) Karin Huebner	2	6	6
(United States) Trey Lewis	0	0
7	(United States) Anna-Maria Fernandez	6	6

Second round
12	(South Africa) Rene Mentz	4	2
(United States) Laura Bernstein	6	6
(United States) Karin Huebner	6	6
7	(United States) Anna-Maria Fernandez	3	2

Qualifying competition
(United States) Laura Bernstein	6^{5}	0
(United States) Karin Huebner	7^{7}	6

=== Fifth qualifier ===
First round
Alt	(United States) Michaela Washington	6	6
(United States) Jackie Joseph	0	0
(United States) Stephanie Rehe	6	6
(Hong Kong) Patricia Hy	3	1
(United States) Anna Ivan	6	6
(Sweden) Lena Sandin	1	3
(Czechoslovakia) Yvona Brzáková	6	5	7^{7}
16	(United Kingdom) Julie Salmon	2	7	6^{4}

Second round
Alt	(United States) Michaela Washington	4	5
(United States) Stephanie Rehe	6	7
(United States) Anna Ivan	5	7	5
(Czechoslovakia) Yvona Brzáková	7	5	7

Qualifying competition
(United States) Stephanie Rehe	6	6
(Czechoslovakia) Yvona Brzáková	2	1

=== Sixth qualifier ===
First round
Alt	(Sweden) Helena Olsson	5	3
(United States) Patty Fendick	7	6
(United States) Susan Rimes	2	7^{7}	7^{10}
(United States) Eileen Tell	6	6^{1}	6^{8}
(United States) Jean Hepner	6	6
(United Kingdom) Shelley Walpole	2	3
(United States) Vicki Beggs	4	3
4	(Italy) Federica Bonsignori	6	6

Second round
(United States) Patty Fendick	6	6
(United States) Susan Rimes	1	1
(United States) Jean Hepner	6	6
4	(Italy) Federica Bonsignori	4	3

Qualifying competition
(United States) Patty Fendick	6	6
(United States) Jean Hepner	3	2

=== Seventh qualifier ===
First round
6	(Japan) Emiko Okagawa	1	3
(United States) Penny Barg	6	6
(United States) Kris Kinney	3	2
(United States) Barbara Jordan	6	6
(United States) Maeve Quinlan	1	4
(United States) Beverly Bowes	6	6
(United States) Molly Van Nostrand	7	6^{4}	5
10	(Italy) Sabina Simmonds	5	7^{7}	7

Second round
(United States) Penny Barg	1	5
(United States) Barbara Jordan	6	7
(United States) Beverly Bowes	6	6
10	(Italy) Sabina Simmonds	3	1

Qualifying competition
(United States) Barbara Jordan	4	3
(United States) Beverly Bowes	6	6

=== Eighth qualifier ===
First round
15	(Switzerland) Karin Stampfli	6	6
(United States) Caryn Copeland	4	1
(Australia) Pam Whytcross	2	1
(Canada) Jill Hetherington	6	6
(United States) Leigh-Anne Eldredge	6	7^{7}
(United States) Carol Christian	4	6^{2}
(Australia) Elizabeth Minter	4	6	6^{4}
2	(Switzerland) Petra Jauch-Delhees	6	2	7^{7}

Second round
15	(Switzerland) Karin Stampfli	4	1
(Canada) Jill Hetherington	6	6
(United States) Leigh-Anne Eldredge	7^{7}	4	4
2	(Switzerland) Petra Jauch-Delhees	6^{3}	6	6

Qualifying competition
(Canada) Jill Hetherington	3	3
2	(Switzerland) Petra Jauch-Delhees	6	6
