= 1983 Wimbledon Championships – Girls' singles =

Girls' singles
- 1983 Wimbledon Championships

Final
- Champion: (France) Pascale Paradis
- Runner-up: (Hong Kong) Patricia Hy
- Score: 6–2, 6–1

Events
Singles	men	women		boys	girls
Doubles	men	women	mixed	boys	girls
WC Singles	men	women	quad
WC Doubles	men	women	quad
Legends	men	women	seniors
← 1982 ·	Wimbledon Championships	· 1984 →

Pascale Paradis defeated Patricia Hy in the final, 6–2, 6–1 to win the girls' singles tennis title at the 1983 Wimbledon Championships.

== Seeds ==
1. (United States) Michelle Torres (third round)
2. (United States) Patty Fendick (quarterfinals)
3. (United States) Beverly Bowes (quarterfinals)
4. (Socialist Federal Republic of Yugoslavia) Sabrina Goleš (second round)
5. (Hong Kong) Patricia Hy (final)
6. (France) Nathalie Herreman (semifinals)
7. (United Kingdom) Amanda Brown (third round)
8. (Australia) Elizabeth Minter (first round)

Click on the seed number of a player to go to their draw section.

== Draw ==
=== Key ===
- Q = Qualifier
- WC = Wild card
- LL = Lucky loser
- Alt = Alternate
- SE = Special exempt
- PR = Protected ranking
- ITF = ITF entry
- JE = Junior exempt
- w/o = Walkover
- r = Retired
- d = Defaulted
- SR = Special ranking

=== Finals ===
Quarterfinals
(Soviet Union) Larisa Savchenko	1	4
(France) Pascale Paradis	6	6
(United States) Terry Phelps	6	5	3
6	(France) Nathalie Herreman	3	7	6
5	(Hong Kong) Patricia Hy	6	7
3	(United States) Beverly Bowes	0	6
(Australia) Bernadette Randall	6	7
2	(United States) Patty Fendick	4	5

Semifinals
(France) Pascale Paradis	6	6
6	(France) Nathalie Herreman	3	2
5	(Hong Kong) Patricia Hy	0	7	6
(Australia) Bernadette Randall	6	5	4

Final
(France) Pascale Paradis	6	6
5	(Hong Kong) Patricia Hy	2	1

=== Top half ===
==== Section 1 ====
First round
1	(United States) Michelle Torres	6	6
(Italy) Barbara Romanò	2	4
(Republic of Ireland) Rhona Howett	1	1
(Soviet Union) Larisa Savchenko	6	6
(United Kingdom) Jo Louis	6	6
(South Africa) Tessa Price	2	3
(France) Pascale Paradis	2	6	6
8	(Australia) Elizabeth Minter	6	1	0

Second round
1	(United States) M Torres	6	6
(Israel) Ruth Sverdloff	0	0
(Soviet Union) L Savchenko	6	6
(Argentina) Mercedes Paz	3	0
(United Kingdom) J Louis	6	6	9
(Japan) Akemi Nishiya	1	7	7
(Singapore) Laura Liong	1	0
(France) P Paradis	6	6

Third round
1	(United States) M Torres	6	5	3
(Soviet Union) L Savchenko	2	7	6
(United Kingdom) J Louis	2	3
(France) P Paradis	6	6

Quarterfinals
(Soviet Union) L Savchenko	1	4
(France) P Paradis	6	6

==== Section 2 ====
First round
(Japan) Akiko Kijimuta	4	6
(United Kingdom) Rina Einy	6	7
(Spain) Elena Guerra	6	6
(Hong Kong) Paulette Moreno	1	0
(United Kingdom) Annabel Croft	6	6
(Australia) Kerry Staunton	2	1
(Philippines) Dyan Castillejo	7	6
(Belgium) Kathleen Schuurmans	5	1

Second round
4	(Socialist Federal Republic of Yugoslavia) Sabrina Goleš	3	4
(United Kingdom) R Einy	6	6
(Spain) E Guerra	5	0
(United States) Terry Phelps	7	6
(United Kingdom) A Croft	6	6
(India) Vidya Priya	0	0
(Philippines) D Castillejo	1	2
6	(France) Nathalie Herreman	6	6

Third round
(United Kingdom) R Einy	1	1
(United States) T Phelps	6	6
(United Kingdom) A Croft	4	2
6	(France) N Herreman	6	6

Quarterfinals
(United States) T Phelps	6	5	3
6	(France) N Herreman	3	7	6

=== Bottom half ===
==== Section 3 ====
First round
5	(Hong Kong) Patricia Hy	6	6
(Australia) Janine Thompson	2	4
(Zimbabwe) Angela Longo	1	1
(United Kingdom) Sarah Sullivan	6	6
(United States) Marianne Werdel	1	6	0
(Sweden) Carin Anderholm	6	2	6
(Austria) Claudia Tranker	0	0
3	(United States) Beverly Bowes	6	6

Second round
5	(Hong Kong) P Hy	6	6
(Czechoslovakia) Olga Votavová	4	1
(South Africa) Monica Reinach	6	5	2
(United Kingdom) S Sullivan	2	7	6
(Sweden) C Anderholm	6	6
(United Kingdom) Belinda Borneo	3	2
(West Germany) Andrea Betzner	6	6	6
3	(United States) B Bowes	2	7	8

Third round
5	(Hong Kong) P Hy	6	6
(United Kingdom) S Sullivan	4	4
(Sweden) C Anderholm	1	2
3	(United States) B Bowes	6	6

Quarterfinals
5	(Hong Kong) P Hy	6	7
3	(United States) B Bowes	0	6

==== Section 4 ====
First round
7	(United Kingdom) Amanda Brown	6	6
(Israel) Sagit Doron	1	1
(South Africa) Rene Mentz	5	6	6
(Brazil) Silvana Campos	7	0	3
(France) Nathalie Phan Thanh	2	4
(Japan) Ei Iida	6	6
(Republic of Ireland) Siobhán Nicholson	5	2
2	(United States) Patty Fendick	7	6

Second round
7	(United Kingdom) A Brown	6	6
(Canada) J Klepac	0	2
(Australia) Bernadette Randall	6	6
(South Africa) R Mentz	3	3
(Japan) E Iida	3	6	2
(Switzerland) E Krapl	6	4	6
(Sweden) Helena Olsson	3	3
2	(United States) P Fendick	6	6

Third round
7	(United Kingdom) A Brown	6	5	8
(Australia) B Randall	4	7	10
(Switzerland) E Krapl	7	5	3
2	(United States) P Fendick	6	7	6

Quarterfinals
(Australia) B Randall	6	7
2	(United States) P Fendick	4	5
