= 1983 Wimbledon Championships – Girls' doubles =

Girls' Doubles In 1983

Girls' doubles
- 1983 Wimbledon Championships

Final
- Champions: (United States) Patty Fendick (Hong Kong) Patricia Hy
- Runners-up: (Sweden) Carin Anderholm (Sweden) Helena Olsson
- Score: 6–1, 7–5

Events
Singles	men	women		boys	girls
Doubles	men	women	mixed	boys	girls
WC Singles	men	women	quad
WC Doubles	men	women	quad
Legends	men	women	seniors
← 1982 ·	Wimbledon Championships	· 1984 →

Patty Fendick and Patricia Hy defeated Carin Anderholm and Helena Olsson in the final, 6–1, 7–5 to win the girls' doubles tennis title at the 1983 Wimbledon Championships.

== Seeds ==
1. (United States) Beverly Bowes / (United States) Terry Phelps (semifinals)
2. (United States) Patty Fendick / (Hong Kong) Patricia Hy (champions)
3. (United States) Michelle Torres / (United States) Marianne Werdel (first round)
4. (France) Nathalie Herreman / (Soviet Union) Larisa Savchenko (semifinals)

== Draw ==
=== Key ===
- Q = Qualifier
- WC = Wild card
- LL = Lucky loser
- Alt = Alternate
- SE = Special exempt
- PR = Protected ranking
- ITF = ITF entry
- JE = Junior exempt
- w/o = Walkover
- r = Retired
- d = Defaulted
- SR = Special ranking

=== Draw ===
First round
1	(United States) Beverly Bowes (United States) Terry Phelps	6	6
(South Africa) Rene Mentz (South Africa) Monica Reinach	4	2
(Japan) Ei Iida (Japan) Akemi Nishiya	6	6
(Austria) Claudia Tranker (Czechoslovakia) Olga Votavová	1	4
3	(United States) Michelle Torres (United States) Marianne Werdel	4	6	3
(France) Pascale Paradis (France) Nathalie Phan Thanh	6	2	6
(Philippines) Dyan Castillejo (Hong Kong) Paulette Moreno	3	1
(Sweden) Carin Anderholm (Sweden) Helena Olsson	6	6
(Australia) Elizabeth Minter (Australia) Bernadette Randall	6	6
(West Germany) Andrea Betzner (Switzerland) Eva Krapl	4	1
(Australia) Kerry Staunton (Australia) Janine Thompson	3	4
4	(France) Nathalie Herreman (Soviet Union) Larisa Savchenko	6	6
(United Kingdom) Amanda Brown (United Kingdom) Rina Einy	5	6	6
(Republic of Ireland) Rhona Howett (Republic of Ireland) Siobhán Nicholson	7	1	1
(Canada) J Klepac (Argentina) Mercedes Paz	3	2
2	(United States) Patty Fendick (Hong Kong) Patricia Hy	6	6

Quarterfinals
1	(United States) Beverly Bowes (United States) Terry Phelps	6	6
(Japan) Ei Iida (Japan) Akemi Nishiya	2	2
(France) Pascale Paradis (France) Nathalie Phan Thanh	5	2
(Sweden) Carin Anderholm (Sweden) Helena Olsson	7	6
(Australia) Elizabeth Minter (Australia) Bernadette Randall	6	3
4	(France) Nathalie Herreman (Soviet Union) Larisa Savchenko	7	6
(United Kingdom) Amanda Brown (United Kingdom) Rina Einy	5	6	3
2	(United States) Patty Fendick (Hong Kong) Patricia Hy	7	1	6

Semifinals
1	(United States) Beverly Bowes (United States) Terry Phelps	3	6	3
(Sweden) Carin Anderholm (Sweden) Helena Olsson	6	3	6
4	(France) Nathalie Herreman (Soviet Union) Larisa Savchenko	7	2	5
2	(United States) Patty Fendick (Hong Kong) Patricia Hy	6	6	7

Final
(Sweden) Carin Anderholm (Sweden) Helena Olsson	1	5
2	(United States) Patty Fendick (Hong Kong) Patricia Hy	6	7
