= 1983 Wimbledon Championships – Women's doubles =

Women's doubles
- 1983 Wimbledon Championships

Final
- Champions: (United States) Martina Navratilova (United States) Pam Shriver
- Runners-up: (United States) Rosie Casals (Australia) Wendy Turnbull
- Score: 6–2, 6–2

Details
- Draw: 56 (4 Q )
- Seeds: 14

Events
Singles	men	women		boys	girls
Doubles	men	women	mixed	boys	girls
WC Singles	men	women	quad
WC Doubles	men	women	quad
Legends	men	women	seniors
← 1982 ·	Wimbledon Championships	· 1984 →

Martina Navratilova and Pam Shriver successfully defended their title, defeating Rosie Casals and Wendy Turnbull in the final, 6–2, 6–2 to win the ladies' doubles tennis title at the 1983 Wimbledon Championships.

== Seeds ==
The top 8 seeds received a bye into the second round.

1. (United States) Martina Navratilova / (United States) Pam Shriver (champions)
2. (South Africa) Rosalyn Fairbank / (United States) Candy Reynolds (third round)
3. (United Kingdom) Jo Durie / (United Kingdom) Anne Hobbs (semifinals)
4. (Czechoslovakia) Hana Mandlíková / (Romania) Virginia Ruzici (second round)
5. (West Germany) Claudia Kohde-Kilsch / (West Germany) Eva Pfaff (quarterfinals)
6. (United States) Rosemary Casals / (Australia) Wendy Turnbull (final)
7. (United States) Barbara Potter / (United States) Sharon Walsh (quarterfinals)
8. (United States) Chris Evert Lloyd / (United States) Billie Jean King (third round)
9. (Socialist Federal Republic of Yugoslavia) Mima Jaušovec / (United States) Kathy Jordan (quarterfinals)
10. (United States) Ann Kiyomura / (United States) Paula Smith (third round)
11. (United States) Lea Antonoplis / (United States) Barbara Jordan (third round)
12. (United States) Elise Burgin / (United States) Alycia Moulton (third round)
13. (South Africa) Beverly Mould / (Australia) Elizabeth Sayers (first round)
14. (France) Catherine Tanvier / (Hungary) Andrea Temesvári (third round)

Click on the seed number of a player to go to their draw section.

== Draw ==
=== Key ===
- Q = Qualifier
- WC = Wild card
- LL = Lucky loser
- Alt = Alternate
- SE = Special exempt
- PR = Protected ranking
- ITF = ITF entry
- JE = Junior exempt
- w/o = Walkover
- r = Retired
- d = Defaulted
- SR = Special ranking

=== Finals ===
Quarterfinals
1	(United States) Martina Navratilova (United States) Pam Shriver	3	6	6
9	(Socialist Federal Republic of Yugoslavia) Mima Jaušovec (United States) Kathy Jordan	6	3	3
3	(United Kingdom) Jo Durie (United Kingdom) Anne Hobbs	6	7
5	(West Germany) Claudia Kohde-Kilsch (West Germany) Eva Pfaff	3	5
6	(United States) Rosie Casals (Australia) Wendy Turnbull	6	5	6
(United States) Andrea Leand (United States) Mary Lou Piatek	3	7	2
7	(United States) Barbara Potter (United States) Sharon Walsh	6	6
Q	(Soviet Union) Svetlana Cherneva (Soviet Union) Larisa Savchenko	2	3

Semifinals
1	(United States) Martina Navratilova (United States) Pam Shriver	7	6
3	(United Kingdom) Jo Durie (United Kingdom) Anne Hobbs	6	4
6	(United States) Rosie Casals (Australia) Wendy Turnbull	6	6	6
7	(United States) Barbara Potter (United States) Sharon Walsh	1	7	4

Final
1	(United States) Martina Navratilova (United States) Pam Shriver	6	6
6	(United States) Rosie Casals (Australia) Wendy Turnbull	2	2

=== Top half ===
==== Section 1 ====
First round
(South Korea) D-h Lee (Romania) L Romanov	4	5
LL	(Australia) A Minter (Australia) E Minter	6	7
(United States) P Fendick (United States) J Klitch	3	4
(Australia) D Fromholtz (Netherlands) B Stöve	6	6
(United States) E Nagelsen (United Kingdom) V Wade	6	6
(New Zealand) C Newton (Spain) C Perea	1	1
(United Kingdom) D Jarrett (Australia) A Tobin	6	5	5
(Switzerland) P Delhees (Switzerland) C Jolissaint	4	7	7
(United States) S Margolin (United States) K Shaefer	7	6
Q	(United Kingdom) C Drury (United Kingdom) E Lightbody	5	3
(Australia) C O'Neil (Australia) P Whytcross	2	2
9	(Socialist Federal Republic of Yugoslavia) M Jaušovec (United States) K Jordan	6	6

Second round
1	(United States) M Navratilova (United States) P Shriver	6	6
LL	(Australia) A Minter (Australia) E Minter	0	2
(Australia) D Fromholtz (Netherlands) B Stöve	3	3
(United States) E Nagelsen (United Kingdom) V Wade	6	6
8	(United States) C Evert Lloyd (United States) BJ King	7	6
(Switzerland) P Delhees (Switzerland) C Jolissaint	6	2
(United States) S Margolin (United States) K Shaefer	2	4
9	(Socialist Federal Republic of Yugoslavia) M Jaušovec (United States) K Jordan	6	6

Third round
1	(United States) M Navratilova (United States) P Shriver	6	6
(United States) E Nagelsen (United Kingdom) V Wade	2	4
8	(United States) C Evert Lloyd (United States) BJ King	7	4	3
9	(Socialist Federal Republic of Yugoslavia) M Jaušovec (United States) K Jordan	5	6	6

Quarterfinals
1	(United States) M Navratilova (United States) P Shriver	3	6	6
9	(Socialist Federal Republic of Yugoslavia) M Jaušovec (United States) K Jordan	6	3	3

==== Section 2 ====
First round
(United States) C Benjamin (France) C Vanier	7	6	3
(Netherlands) M Mesker (United States) J Russell	6	7	6
(South Africa) Y Vermaak (United States) N Yeargin	2	7	3
(South Africa) I Kloss (United States) P Teeguarden	6	6	6
(Australia) B Remilton (Japan) N Sato	1	5
14	(France) C Tanvier (Hungary) A Temesvári	6	7
12	(United States) E Burgin (United States) A Moulton	6	6
(United States) P Casale (United States) K Sands	2	3
(United States) S Acker (United States) L Forood	6	6
LL	(Australia) N Gregory (United States) T Mochizuki	1	3
(Australia) S Leo (Italy) S Simmonds	6	6
(United States) K Latham (United States) K Steinmetz	3	2

Second round
3	(United Kingdom) J Durie (United Kingdom) A Hobbs	6	6
(Netherlands) M Mesker (United States) J Russell	3	3
(South Africa) I Kloss (United States) P Teeguarden	6	6	4
14	(France) C Tanvier (Hungary) A Temesvári	7	4	6
12	(United States) E Burgin (United States) A Moulton	7	6
(United States) S Acker (United States) L Forood	5	4
(Australia) S Leo (Italy) S Simmonds	7	5	7
5	(West Germany) C Kohde-Kilsch (West Germany) E Pfaff	6	7	9

Third round
3	(United Kingdom) J Durie (United Kingdom) A Hobbs	6	6
14	(France) C Tanvier (Hungary) A Temesvári	4	4
12	(United States) E Burgin (United States) A Moulton	3	4
5	(West Germany) C Kohde-Kilsch (West Germany) E Pfaff	6	6

Quarterfinals
3	(United Kingdom) J Durie (United Kingdom) A Hobbs	6	7
5	(West Germany) C Kohde-Kilsch (West Germany) E Pfaff	3	5

=== Bottom half ===
==== Section 3 ====
First round
(Czechoslovakia) I Budařová (Czechoslovakia) M Skuherská	6	6
(United Kingdom) A Brown (United Kingdom) R Einy	2	1
(United Kingdom) S Gomer (United Kingdom) J Salmon	6	6
LL	(United Kingdom) P Brailsford (United Kingdom) R Lewis	0	0
(United States) L Gordon (United States) V Nelson	2	1
11	(United States) L Antonoplis (United States) B Jordan	6	6
13	(South Africa) B Mould (Australia) E Sayers	6	5	3
(United States) A Leand (United States) M L Piatek	4	7	6
(United States) J Davis (United States) H Ludloff	6	6
Q	(Australia) B Randall (Australia) K Staunton	2	3
(United States) S Collins (Czechoslovakia) H Suková	7	0	6
(United States) L Allen (United States) W White	5	6	2

Second round
6	(United States) R Casals (Australia) W Turnbull	6	6
(Czechoslovakia) I Budařová (Czechoslovakia) M Skuherská	4	4
(United Kingdom) S Gomer (United Kingdom) J Salmon	6	2	4
11	(United States) L Antonoplis (United States) B Jordan	2	6	6
(United States) A Leand (United States) M L Piatek	6	5	6
(United States) J Davis (United States) H Ludloff	3	7	3
(United States) S Collins (Czechoslovakia) H Suková	0	7	6
4	(Czechoslovakia) H Mandlíková (Romania) V Ruzici	6	5	3

Third round
6	(United States) R Casals (Australia) W Turnbull	6	6
11	(United States) L Antonoplis (United States) B Jordan	4	0
(United States) A Leand (United States) M L Piatek	6	3	6
(United States) S Collins (Czechoslovakia) H Suková	1	6	4

Quarterfinals
6	(United States) R Casals (Australia) W Turnbull	6	5	6
(United States) A Leand (United States) M L Piatek	3	7	2

==== Section 4 ====
First round
10	(United States) A Kiyomura (United States) P Smith	6	6
(United States) A Holton (United States) K Holton	4	2
(United States) A Henricksson (United States) J Preyer	2	4
(United States) T Lewis (United States) S McInerney	6	6
(United States) B Hallquist (United States) A White	6	6
(Brazil) P Medrado (Brazil) C Monteiro	4	3
Q	(South Africa) R Mentz (South Africa) M Reinach	3	7	3
(United States) A-M Fernandez (United States) E Herr	6	6	6
Q	(Soviet Union) S Cherneva (Soviet Union) L Savchenko	6	6
(United Kingdom) S Barker (Australia) E Goolagong Cawley	3	4
(Canada) C Bassett (United States) Z Garrison	7	2	6
(South Africa) J Mundel (South Africa) R Uys	6	6	3

Second round
10	(United States) A Kiyomura (United States) P Smith	6	6
(United States) T Lewis (United States) S McInerney	3	4
(United States) B Hallquist (United States) A White	4	6	2
7	(United States) B Potter (United States) S Walsh	6	3	6
(United States) A-M Fernandez (United States) E Herr	6	7	6
Q	(Soviet Union) S Cherneva (Soviet Union) L Savchenko	7	5	8
(Canada) C Bassett (United States) Z Garrison	3	3
2	(South Africa) R Fairbank (United States) C Reynolds	6	6

Third round
10	(United States) A Kiyomura (United States) P Smith	2	1
7	(United States) B Potter (United States) S Walsh	6	6
Q	(Soviet Union) S Cherneva (Soviet Union) L Savchenko	3	7	6
2	(South Africa) R Fairbank (United States) C Reynolds	6	6	4

Quarterfinals
7	(United States) B Potter (United States) S Walsh	6	6
Q	(Soviet Union) S Cherneva (Soviet Union) L Savchenko	2	3
