= 1983 Wimbledon Championships – Boys' doubles =

Boys' doubles
- 1983 Wimbledon Championships

Final
- Champions: (Australia) Mark Kratzmann (Australia) Simon Youl
- Runners-up: (Romania) Mihnea-Ion Năstase (Finland) Olli Rahnasto
- Score: 6–4, 6–4

Events
Singles	men	women		boys	girls
Doubles	men	women	mixed	boys	girls
WC Singles	men	women	quad
WC Doubles	men	women	quad
Legends	men	women	seniors
← 1982 ·	Wimbledon Championships	· 1984 →

Pat Cash and John Frawley were the defending champions but Cash did not compete. Frawley competed with Jonathan Canter but lost in the quarterfinals to Karel Nováček and Norbert Teufelberger.

Mark Kratzmann and Simon Youl defeated Mihnea-Ion Năstase and Olli Rahnasto in the final, 6–4, 6–4 to win the boys' doubles tennis title at the 1983 Wimbledon Championships.

== Seeds ==
1. (United States) Jonathan Canter / (United States) John Frawley (quarterfinals)
2. (Sweden) Stefan Edberg / (Sweden) Jonas Svensson (semifinals)
3. (Romania) Mihnea-Ion Năstase / (Finland) Olli Rahnasto (final)
4. (Australia) Mark Kratzmann / (Australia) Simon Youl (champions)

== Draw ==
=== Key ===
- Q = Qualifier
- WC = Wild card
- LL = Lucky loser
- Alt = Alternate
- SE = Special exempt
- PR = Protected ranking
- ITF = ITF entry
- JE = Junior exempt
- w/o = Walkover
- r = Retired
- d = Defaulted
- SR = Special ranking

=== Draw ===
First round
1	(United States) Jonathan Canter (United States) John Frawley	6	6
(Japan) Kaoru Maruyama (Japan) Haruo Nakano	2	4
(Czechoslovakia) Karel Nováček (Austria) Norbert Teufelberger	6	5	8
(France) Franck Février (France) Éric Winogradsky	3	7	6
3	(Romania) Mihnea-Ion Năstase (Finland) Olli Rahnasto	7	6
(France) Franck Hamonet (Switzerland) Claudio Mezzadri	5	2
(South Africa) Gustav Fichardt (Chile) Manuel Rodríguez	7	4	18
(Soviet Union) Andrei Chesnokov (Soviet Union) Andrei Olhovskiy	5	6	20
(United States) Aaron Krickstein (United States) Bill Stanley	6	6
(Brazil) Carlos Chabalgoity (Brazil) Fernando Roese	3	2
(Spain) Jorge Bardou (Spain) Emilio Sánchez	3	7	3
4	(Australia) Mark Kratzmann (Australia) Simon Youl	6	5	6
(United Kingdom) Jason Clunie (United Kingdom) Peter Moore	3	3
(South Africa) Pieter Aldrich (South Africa) Royce Deppe	6	6
(United States) Eric Amend (United States) Patrick McEnroe	2	4
2	(Sweden) Stefan Edberg (Sweden) Jonas Svensson	6	6

Quarterfinals
1	(United States) Jonathan Canter (United States) John Frawley	4	3
(Czechoslovakia) Karel Nováček (Austria) Norbert Teufelberger	6	6
3	(Romania) Mihnea-Ion Năstase (Finland) Olli Rahnasto	6	6
(Soviet Union) Andrei Chesnokov (Soviet Union) Andrei Olhovskiy	4	3
(United States) Aaron Krickstein (United States) Bill Stanley	4	7	1
4	(Australia) Mark Kratzmann (Australia) Simon Youl	6	6	6
(South Africa) Pieter Aldrich (South Africa) Royce Deppe	4	4
2	(Sweden) Stefan Edberg (Sweden) Jonas Svensson	6	6

Semifinals
(Czechoslovakia) Karel Nováček (Austria) Norbert Teufelberger	7	3	6
3	(Romania) Mihnea-Ion Năstase (Finland) Olli Rahnasto	6	6	8
4	(Australia) Mark Kratzmann (Australia) Simon Youl	6	7
2	(Sweden) Stefan Edberg (Sweden) Jonas Svensson	4	5

Final
3	(Romania) Mihnea-Ion Năstase (Finland) Olli Rahnasto	4	4
4	(Australia) Mark Kratzmann (Australia) Simon Youl	6	6
