= 1983 Wimbledon Championships – Boys' singles =

Boys' singles
- 1983 Wimbledon Championships

Final
- Champion: (Sweden) Stefan Edberg
- Runner-up: (Australia) John Frawley
- Score: 6–3, 7–6^{(7–5)}

Events
Singles	men	women		boys	girls
Doubles	men	women	mixed	boys	girls
WC Singles	men	women	quad
WC Doubles	men	women	quad
Legends	men	women	seniors
← 1982 ·	Wimbledon Championships	· 1984 →

Stefan Edberg defeated John Frawley in the final, 6–3, 7–6^{(7–5)} to win the boys' singles tennis title at the 1983 Wimbledon Championships.

== Seeds ==
1. (Sweden) Stefan Edberg (champion)
2. (Australia) John Frawley (final)
3. (United Kingdom) Jonathan Canter (quarterfinals)
4. (United States) Bill Stanley (first round)
5. (Spain) Jorge Bardou (second round)
6. (Czechoslovakia) Karel Nováček (semifinals)
7. (France) Franck Février (quarterfinals)
8. (Australia) Simon Youl (quarterfinals)

Click on the seed number of a player to go to their draw section.

== Draw ==
=== Key ===
- Q = Qualifier
- WC = Wild card
- LL = Lucky loser
- Alt = Alternate
- SE = Special exempt
- PR = Protected ranking
- ITF = ITF entry
- JE = Junior exempt
- w/o = Walkover
- r = Retired
- d = Defaulted
- SR = Special ranking

=== Finals ===
Quarterfinals
1	(Sweden) Stefan Edberg	6	6
8	(Australia) Simon Youl	4	4
(Austria) Norbert Teufelberger	7	4	2
(United States) Patrick McEnroe	5	6	6
6	(Czechoslovakia) Karel Nováček	6	7
3	(United Kingdom) Jonathan Canter	4	6
7	(France) Franck Février	1	3
2	(Australia) John Frawley	6	6

Semifinals
1	(Sweden) Stefan Edberg	3	7	6
(United States) Patrick McEnroe	6	6	2
6	(Czechoslovakia) Karel Nováček	6	5
2	(Australia) John Frawley	7	6

Final
1	(Sweden) Stefan Edberg	6	7^{7}
2	(Australia) John Frawley	3	6^{5}

=== Top half ===
==== Section 1 ====
First round
1	(Sweden) Stefan Edberg	6	6
(West Germany) Boris Becker	2	4
(United Kingdom) Jason Clunie	6	6
(Mexico) Agustín Moreno	4	4
(United States) Aaron Krickstein	6	6
(Philippines) Felix Barrientos	2	3
(France) Franck Hamonet	6	6
(Republic of Ireland) F McCracken	1	1
(South Africa) Gustav Fichardt	6	6
(Pakistan) Mushaf Zia	1	1
(Philippines) Manuel Tolentino	1	3
(Brazil) Carlos Chabalgoity	6	6
(Denmark) Morten Christensen	6	3
(Belgium) Karel Demuynck	7	6
(South Africa) Dean Johnson	4	2
8	(Australia) Simon Youl	6	6

Second round
1	(Sweden) S Edberg	6	6
(United Kingdom) J Clunie	2	2
(United States) A Krickstein	6	6
(France) F Hamonet	2	2
(South Africa) G Fichardt	3	3
(Brazil) C Chabalgoity	6	6
(Belgium) K Demuynck	7	3	2
8	(Australia) S Youl	6	6	6

Third round
1	(Sweden) S Edberg	6	6
(United States) A Krickstein	3	2
(Brazil) C Chabalgoity	1	4
8	(Australia) S Youl	6	6

Quarterfinals
1	(Sweden) S Edberg	6	6
8	(Australia) S Youl	4	4

==== Section 2 ====
First round
4	(United States) Bill Stanley	6	5	5
(Finland) Olli Rahnasto	1	7	7
(Spain) David de Miguel	4	4
(Japan) Haruo Nakano	6	6
(United Kingdom) Rodney Jeffreys	4	0
(France) Éric Winogradsky	6	6
(The Bahamas) M Prestwich	3	3
(Austria) Norbert Teufelberger	6	6
(Switzerland) Claudio Mezzadri	3	5
(Brazil) Fernando Roese	6	7
(Portugal) João Maio	4	4
(United Kingdom) Paul Coyle	6	6
(United States) Patrick McEnroe	6	6
(Italy) Marcello Bassanelli	1	3
(India) Denish Reddy	1	2
5	(Spain) Jorge Bardou	6	6

Second round
(Finland) O Rahnasto	6	6
(Japan) H Nakano	2	3
(France) É Winogradsky	4	6
(Austria) N Teufelberger	6	7
(Brazil) F Roese	7	6
(United Kingdom) P Coyle	6	2
(United States) P McEnroe	7	6
5	(Spain) J Bardou	6	3

Third round
(Finland) O Rahnasto	4	6
(Austria) N Teufelberger	6	7
(Brazil) F Roese	0	2
(United States) P McEnroe	6	6

Quarterfinals
(Austria) N Teufelberger	7	4	2
(United States) P McEnroe	5	6	6

=== Bottom half ===
==== Section 3 ====
First round
6	(Czechoslovakia) Karel Nováček	6	6
(Jamaica) Noel Rutherford	3	1
(United States) Eric Amend	6	6
(Zimbabwe) Grieg Rodger	0	2
(Soviet Union) Andrei Olhovskiy	6	5
(South Africa) Pieter Aldrich	7	7
(Romania) Mihnea-Ion Năstase	6	6
(Hong Kong) Paul Bailey	2	4
(Greece) Anastasios Bavelas	6	6	6
(Denmark) Michael Tauson	7	3	4
(Philippines) Antonio del Rosario	2	7	6
(South Africa) Marius Masencamp	6	6	3
(Chile) Manuel Rodríguez	2	6
(West Germany) Udo Riglewski	6	7
(Italy) Paolo Canè	2	3
3	(United Kingdom) Jonathan Canter	6	6

Second round
6	(Czechoslovakia) K Nováček	6	6
(United States) E Amend	4	1
(South Africa) P Aldrich	4	3
(Romania) M-I Năstase	6	6
(Greece) A Bavelas	6	6	6
(Philippines) A del Rosario	1	7	3
(West Germany) U Riglewski	3	4
3	(United Kingdom) J Canter	6	6

Third round
6	(Czechoslovakia) K Nováček	6	6
(Romania) M-I Năstase	2	4
(Greece) A Bavelas	3	6
3	(United Kingdom) J Canter	6	7

Quarterfinals
6	(Czechoslovakia) K Nováček	6	7
3	(United Kingdom) J Canter	4	6

==== Section 4 ====
First round
7	(France) Franck Février	6	7
(United Kingdom) Peter Moore	1	6
(South Africa) Royce Deppe	6	6
(Peru) Enrique González	2	1
(Brazil) José Wasserfirer	3	6	6
(Spain) Emilio Sánchez	6	3	4
(Soviet Union) Andrei Chesnokov	6	6	6
(Israel) Russell Meyers	4	7	3
(Spain) Fernando García Lleó	2	3
(Australia) Mark Kratzmann	6	6
(Sweden) Jonas Svensson	6	6
(Socialist Federal Republic of Yugoslavia) Gábor Róza	2	4
(United Kingdom) Benjamin Knapp	6	1	7
(Venezuela) Alejandro Chacón	4	6	5
(Japan) Kaoru Maruyama	2	1
2	(Australia) John Frawley	6	6

Second round
7	(France) F Février	6	2	6
(South Africa) R Deppe	2	6	2
(Brazil) J Wasserfirer	6	0
(Soviet Union) A Chesnokov	7	6
(Australia) M Kratzmann	5	4
(Sweden) J Svensson	7	6
(United Kingdom) B Knapp	0	0
2	(Australia) J Frawley	6	6

Third round
7	(France) F Février	6	6	6
(Soviet Union) A Chesnokov	7	3	3
(Sweden) J Svensson	6	1	4
2	(Australia) J Frawley	3	6	6

Quarterfinals
7	(France) F Février	1	3
2	(Australia) J Frawley	6	6
