= Amanda Brown (tennis) =

British tennis player

- Country (sports): (United Kingdom) Great Britain
- Born: 2 May 1965 (age 59)
- Turned pro: 1982
- Retired: 1986
- Prize money: US$77,096

Singles
- Career record: 24–43
- Career titles: 0 WTA, 0 ITF

Grand Slam singles results
- Australian Open: 2R (1985)
- French Open: 1R (1985)
- Wimbledon: 2R (1983, 1984)
- US Open: 1R (1984, 1985)

Other tournaments
- Olympic Games: 2R (1984)

Doubles
- Career record: 12–37
- Career titles: 0 WTA, 0 ITF

Grand Slam doubles results
- Australian Open: 1R (1983, 1985)
- French Open: 1R (1985)
- Wimbledon: 1R (1983, 1984, 1985, 1986)
- US Open: 1R (1984, 1985)
- Last updated on: 5 February 2015.

Amanda Brown (born 2 May 1965) is a former professional British tennis player who reached the second round of Wimbledon (on two occasions) and the Australian Open, as well as competing for Great Britain at the 1984 Olympics and the 1984 Federation Cup. As a junior, she twice won the junior title at the Australian Open, in 1982 and 1983. She played her first matches on the WTA tour in November 1982 and her final matches at Wimbledon in 1986. During her career, Brown successfully gained victories over players such as Sue Barker, Sara Gomer, Annabel Croft and Gigi Fernández.

Brown also reached the doubles final at the tournament in Salt Lake City in 1983, the singles semifinals in Hershey (as a qualifier) and Denver in 1984, and the singles quarterfinals in Melbourne in 1985.

== Performance timelines ==
Key
W	F	SF	QF	#R	RR	Q#	DNQ	A	NH

(W) winner; (F) finalist; (SF) semifinalist; (QF) quarterfinalist; (#R) rounds 4, 3, 2, 1; (RR) round-robin stage; (Q#) qualification round; (DNQ) did not qualify; (A) absent; (NH) not held; (SR) strike rate (events won / competed); (W–L) win–loss record.

=== Singles ===
Tournament	1982	1983	1984	1985	1986	Career win–loss
Australian Open	Q1	1R	Q2	2R	A	1–2
French Open	A	A	A	1R	A	0–1
Wimbledon	A	2R	2R	1R	1R	2–4
US Open	Q2	Q1	1R	1R	A	0–2

=== Doubles ===
Tournament	1982	1983	1984	1985	1986	Career win–loss
Australian Open	1R	A	A	1R	A	0–2
French Open	A	A	A	1R	A	0–1
Wimbledon	A	1R	1R	1R	1R	0–4
US Open	A	A	1R	1R	A	0–2

=== Mixed doubles ===
Tournament	1984	Career win–loss
Australian Open	A	0–0
French Open	A	0–0
Wimbledon	2R	1–1
US Open	A	0–0

=== Fed Cup ===
1984 Federation Cup Main Draw
Date	Venue	Surface	Round	Opponents	Final match score	Match	Opponent	Rubber score
15–22 Jul 1984	São Paulo	Clay	R1	Bulgaria	0–3	Doubles (with Anne Hobbs)	K. Maleeva/Man. Maleeva	6–7, 5–7 (L)
1984 Federation Cup consolation rounds
15–22 Jul 1984	São Paulo	Clay	R1	BYE				
15–22 Jul 1984	São Paulo	Clay	R2	Canada	2–1	Singles	Eva Rozsavolgyi	6–4, 6–3 (W)
15–22 Jul 1984	São Paulo	Clay	R2	Canada	2–1	Doubles (with Jo Durie)	Ritecz/Rozsavolgyi	6–2, 7–5 (W)
15–22 Jul 1984	São Paulo	Clay	Quarterfinals	Hungary	2–1	Singles	Karen Dewis	6–4, 6–2 (W)
15–22 Jul 1984	São Paulo	Clay	Quarterfinals	Hungary	2–1	Doubles (with Jo Durie)	Hetherington/Pelletier	7–6, 6–2 (W)
15–22 Jul 1984	São Paulo	Clay	Semifinals	Brazil	1–2	Singles	Silvana Campos	4–6, 5–7 (L)
15–22 Jul 1984	São Paulo	Clay	Semifinals	Brazil	1–2	Doubles (with Anne Hobbs)	Medrado/Monteiro	5–7, 5–7 (L)
