= 1983 Wimbledon Championships =

- Date: 20 June – 3 July
- Edition: 97th
- Category: Grand Slam
- Draw: 128S/64D/56XD
- Prize money: £978,211
- Surface: Grass
- Location: Church Road; SW19, Wimbledon, London, United Kingdom
- Venue: All England Lawn Tennis and Croquet Club

Champions

Men's singles
- (United States) John McEnroe

Women's singles
- (United States) Martina Navratilova

Men's doubles
- (United States) Peter Fleming / (United States) John McEnroe

Women's doubles
- (United States) Martina Navratilova / (United States) Pam Shriver

Mixed doubles
- (United Kingdom) John Lloyd / (Australia) Wendy Turnbull

Boys' singles
- (Sweden) Stefan Edberg

Girls' singles
- (France) Pascale Paradis

Boys' doubles
- (Australia) Mark Kratzmann / (Australia) Simon Youl

Girls' doubles
- (United States) Patty Fendick / (Hong Kong) Patricia Hy
← 1982 ·	Wimbledon Championships	· 1984 →

The 1983 Wimbledon Championships was a tennis tournament played on grass courts at the All England Lawn Tennis and Croquet Club in Wimbledon, London in the United Kingdom. It was the 97th edition of the Wimbledon Championships and were held from 20 June to 3 July 1983.

== Prize money ==
The total prize money for 1983 championships was £978,211. The winner of the men's title earned £66,600 while the women's singles champion earned £60,000.

Event	W	F	SF	QF	Round of 16	Round of 32	Round of 64	Round of 128
Men's singles	£66,600	£33,300	£16,650	£8,430	£4,880	£2,662	£1,533	£888
Women's singles	£60,000	£30,000	£14,585	£7,123	£3,904	£2,048	£1,196	£684
Men's doubles *	£26,628	£13,314	£6,656	£2,664	£1,330	£444	£222	—
Women's doubles *	£23,100	£11,550	£5,324	£2,130	£974	£320	£160	—
Mixed doubles *	£12,000	£6,000	£3,000	£1,400	£700	£350	£150	—

_{* per team}

== Champions ==
=== Seniors ===
==== Men's singles ====
(United States) John McEnroe defeated (New Zealand) Chris Lewis, 6–2, 6–2, 6–2

- It was McEnroe's 5th career Grand Slam title and his 2nd Wimbledon title.

==== Women's singles ====
(United States) Martina Navratilova defeated (United States) Andrea Jaeger, 6–0, 6–3

- It was Navratilova's 18th career Grand Slam title and her 4th Wimbledon single's title.

==== Men's doubles ====
(United States) Peter Fleming / (United States) John McEnroe defeated (United States) Tim Gullikson / (United States) Tom Gullikson, 6–4, 6–3, 6–4

- It was Fleming's 5th career Grand Slam title and his 3rd Wimbledon title. It was McEnroe's 11th career Grand Slam title and his 5th Wimbledon title.

==== Women's doubles ====
(United States) Martina Navratilova / (United States) Pam Shriver defeated (United States) Rosie Casals / (Australia) Wendy Turnbull, 6–2, 6–2

- It was Navratilova's 19th career Grand Slam title and her 9th Wimbledon title. It was Shriver's 4th career Grand Slam title and her 3rd Wimbledon title.

==== Mixed doubles ====
(United Kingdom) John Lloyd / (Australia) Wendy Turnbull defeated (United States) Steve Denton / (United States) Billie Jean King, 6–7^{(5–7)}, 7–6^{(7–5)}, 7–5

- It was Lloyd's 2nd career Grand Slam title and his 1st Wimbledon title. It was Turnbull's 8th career Grand Slam title and her 2nd Wimbledon title.

=== Juniors ===
==== Boys' singles ====
(Sweden) Stefan Edberg defeated (Australia) John Frawley, 6–3, 7–6^{(7–5)}

==== Girls' singles ====
(France) Pascale Paradis defeated (Hong Kong) Patricia Hy, 6–2, 6–1

==== Boys' doubles ====
(Australia) Mark Kratzmann / (Australia) Simon Youl defeated (Romania) Mihnea-Ion Năstase / (Finland) Olli Rahnasto, 6–4, 6–4

==== Girls' doubles ====
(United States) Patty Fendick / (Hong Kong) Patricia Hy defeated (Sweden) Carin Anderholm / (Sweden) Helena Olsson, 6–1, 7–5

== Singles seeds ==
=== Men's singles ===
1. (United States) Jimmy Connors (fourth round, lost to Kevin Curren)
2. (United States) John McEnroe (champion)
3. (Czechoslovakia) Ivan Lendl (semifinals, lost to John McEnroe)
4. (Argentina) Guillermo Vilas (first round, lost to Nduka Odizor)
5. (Sweden) Mats Wilander (third round, lost to Roscoe Tanner)
6. (United States) Gene Mayer (withdrew before the tournament began)
7. (Argentina) José Luis Clerc (first round, lost to Claudio Panatta)
8. (United States) Vitas Gerulaitis (second round, lost to Mark Edmondson)
9. (United States) Steve Denton (first round, lost to Chris Lewis)
10. (United States) Jimmy Arias (withdrew before the tournament began)
11. (United States) Johan Kriek (third round, lost to Robert Van't Hof)
12. (South Africa) Kevin Curren (semifinals, lost to Chris Lewis)
13. (United States) Brian Gottfried (fourth round, lost to Mel Purcell)
14. (United States) Bill Scanlon (fourth round, lost to John McEnroe)
15. (United States) Hank Pfister (second round, lost to Ricardo Acuña)
16. (United States) Tim Mayotte (quarterfinals, lost to Kevin Curren)

=== Women's singles ===
1. (United States) Martina Navratilova (champion)
2. (United States) Chris Evert Lloyd (third round, lost to Kathy Jordan)
3. (United States) Andrea Jaeger (final, lost to Martina Navratilova)
4. (United States) Tracy Austin (withdrew before the tournament began)
5. (United States) Pam Shriver (first round, lost to Iva Budařová)
6. (West Germany) Bettina Bunge (first round, lost to Christiane Jolissaint)
7. (Australia) Wendy Turnbull (fourth round, lost to Billie Jean King)
8. (Czechoslovakia) Hana Mandlíková (fourth round, lost to Jennifer Mundel)
9. (West Germany) Sylvia Hanika (third round, lost to Jennifer Mundel)
10. (United States) Billie Jean King (semifinals, lost to Andrea Jaeger)
11. (United States) Barbara Potter (quarterfinals, lost to Andrea Jaeger)
12. (Romania) Virginia Ruzici (fourth round, lost to Yvonne Vermaak)
13. (United Kingdom) Jo Durie (third round, lost to Eva Pfaff)
14. (Hungary) Andrea Temesvári (third round, lost to Carling Bassett)
15. (United States) Kathy Rinaldi (fourth round, lost to Kathy Jordan)
16. (West Germany) Claudia Kohde-Kilsch (fourth round, lost to Martina Navratilova)

Preceded by 1983 French Open	Grand Slams	Succeeded by 1983 US Open
