= Kim Staunton =

Australian tennis player

- Country (sports): Australia
- Born: 24 March 1966 (age 58)

Singles

Grand Slam singles results
- Australian Open: 1R (1983)
- Wimbledon: Q2 (1983)

Doubles

Grand Slam doubles results
- Australian Open: 1R (1988)
- Wimbledon: 1R (1983)

Kim Staunton (born 24 March 1966) is an Australian former professional tennis player.

Staunton, a player from Sydney, was a two-time Australian Open girls' doubles champion, with Annette Gulley in 1982 and Bernadette Randall in 1983. When she won in 1983 she also earned a position in the women's singles main draw, but came up against the 13th-seeded Claudia Kohde-Kilsch in the first round and lost in straight sets.
