= Sally Reeves =

British tennis player

- Country (sports): United Kingdom
- Born: 8 July 1964 (age 60)
- Plays: Right-handed
- Prize money: $22,837

Singles
- Highest ranking: No. 199 (27 April 1987)

Grand Slam singles results
- French Open: Q1 (1985, 1986)
- Wimbledon: 2R (1985)
- US Open: Q1 (1984)

Doubles

Grand Slam doubles results
- Wimbledon: Q1 (1986)

Sally Reeves (born 8 July 1964) is a British former professional tennis player. Following marriage she is now known as Sally Taylor.

A right-handed player, Reeves reached a career high singles ranking of 199 in the world and featured three times in the main draw at Wimbledon. On her Wimbledon debut in 1984 she lost a close first round match to Catherine Tanvier 6–8 in the third set. She made the second round for the only time at the 1985 Wimbledon Championships, where she had a win over fellow British wildcard Rina Einy.

== ITF finals ==
=== Singles: 2 (0–2) ===
Outcome	No.	Date	Tournament	Surface	Opponent	Score
Runner-up	1.	13 May 1984	Sutton, United Kingdom	Clay	(United States) Kristin Kinney	6–4, 3–6, 1–6
Runner-up	2.	19 November 1984	Glasgow, United Kingdom	Hard	(United States) Beth Norton	3–6, 4–6
