= Karin Stampfli =

Swiss tennis player (born 1963)

- Country (sports): Switzerland
- Born: 7 September 1963 (age 62)
- Plays: Right-handed
- Prize money: $21,303

Singles

Grand Slam singles results
- Australian Open: Q1 (1982)
- French Open: Q2 (1982, 1985)
- Wimbledon: Q2 (1982)
- US Open: Q2 (1984)

Karin Stampfli (born 7 September 1963) is a Swiss former professional tennis player. She is now Karin Pelizzari.

Stampfli, a French Open junior semi-finalist, competed on the professional tour in the 1980s. The 1982 Swiss indoor champion, Stampfli featured in the qualifying draws of all four grand slam tournaments during her career. She had a win over Roland Garros champion Sue Barker at the 1984 U.S. Clay Court Championships.
