= Renata Šašak =

Yugoslavian tennis player

- Full name: Renata Šašak-Ružir
- Country (sports): Yugoslavia
- Born: 14 June 1964 (age 62) Zagreb, SR Croatia, Yugoslavia
- Retired: 1987
- Plays: Right-handed (one-handed backhand)
- Prize money: $48,637

Singles
- Career record: 22–34
- Highest ranking: No. 294 (15 March 1987)

Grand Slam singles results
- Australian Open: Q1 (1983)
- French Open: 2R (1983)
- Wimbledon: Q3 (1983)
- US Open: 1R (1983)

Other tournaments
- Olympic Games: 2R (1984)

Doubles
- Career record: 13–22
- Career titles: 3 ITF
- Highest ranking: No. 210 (21 December 1986)

Grand Slam doubles results
- French Open: 2R (1984)

Team competitions
- Fed Cup: 13-12
Medal record
Mediterranean Games
Gold medal – first place	1979 Split	Doubles
Gold medal – first place	1983 Casablanca	Singles
Summer Universiade
Bronze medal – third place	1987 Zagreb	Doubles

Renata Šašak-Ružir (born 14 June 1964) is a former Yugoslavian professional tennis player.

== Biography ==
Born in Zagreb, Šašak debuted for the Yugoslavia Federation Cup team in 1979. One of her Federation Cup doubles teammates was Mima Jaušovec, who Šašak teamed up with to win a gold medal at the 1979 Mediterranean Games. She won a further gold medal four years in Casablanca at the 1983 Mediterranean Games, beating Laura Golarsa to win the women's singles.

Šašak competed in the main draw of both the French Open and US Open during her career. Her best performance came at the 1983 French Open, where she made it to the second round, then took fifth seed Pam Shriver to a third set before being eliminated. She was awarded the Croatian Sportswoman of the Year award from Sportske novosti in 1983.

At the 1984 Summer Olympics in Los Angeles, Šašak represented Yugoslavia in the women's singles event, for what was then a demonstration sport. She fell in the second round, after beating third seed Laura Arraya.

Šašak played Federation Cup tennis until 1987, in a total of 15 ties. This included Yugoslavia's run to the 1984 semi-finals, which they lost to eventual champions Czechoslovakia.

== ITF Circuit finals ==
=== Singles: 2 (2 runner-ups) ===
Legend $10,000 tournaments (0–2)	Finals by surface Clay (0–2)

Result	W–L	Date	Tournament	Tier	Surface	Opponent	Score
Loss	0–1	Aug 1984	ITF Rheda-Wiedenbrück, Germany	10,000	Clay	(France) Isabelle Demongeot	6–7, 5–7
Loss	0–2	Jun 1986	ITF Rabac, Yugoslavia	10,000	Clay	(Italy) Linda Ferrando	2–6, 3–6

=== Doubles: 7 (3 titles, 4 runner-ups) ===
Legend $25,000 tournaments (0–2) $10,000 tournaments (3–2)	Finals by surface Clay (3–4)

Result	W–L	Date	Tournament	Tier	Surface	Partner	Opponents	Score
Win	1–0	Sep 1982	ITF Bad Hersfeld, West Germany	10,000	Clay	(Argentina) Beatriz Villaverde	(Czech Republic) Nataša Piskáčková (Poland) Dorota Dziekońska	6–2, 6–3
Loss	1–1	Mar 1983	ITF Taranto, Italy	10,000	Clay	(Socialist Federal Republic of Yugoslavia) Sabrina Goleš	(Australia) Elizabeth Minter (Australia) Bernadette Randall	5–7, 1–6
Loss	1–2	Apr 1983	ITF Bari, Italy	10,000	Clay	(Socialist Federal Republic of Yugoslavia) Sabrina Goleš	(Australia) Elizabeth Minter (Australia) Anne Minter	4–6, 2–6
Win	2–2	Apr 1984	ITF Caserta, Italy	10,000	Clay	(Latvia) Larisa Neiland	(Czech Republic) Marie Pinterová (Poland) Renáta Tomanová	6–1, 6–3
Win	3–2	Aug 1984	ITF Bad Hersfeld, West Germany	10,000	Clay	(Argentina) Beatriz Villaverde	(Australia) Vicki Marler (Australia) Miranda Yates	6–4, 7–6
Loss	3–3	Oct 1984	ITF Sofia, Bulgaria	25,000	Clay	(Czech Republic) Regina Maršíková	(Czech Republic) Alice Noháčová (Czech Republic) Regina Rajchrtová	2–6, 5–7
Loss	3–4	Sep 1986	ITF Zagreb, Yugoslavia	25,000	Clay	(Socialist Federal Republic of Yugoslavia) Karmen Škulj	(Soviet Union) Natalia Egorova (Soviet Union) Viktoria Milvidskaia	2–6, 3–6
