= 1983 Wimbledon Championships – Mixed doubles =

Mixed doubles
- 1983 Wimbledon Championships

Final
- Champions: (United Kingdom) John Lloyd (Australia) Wendy Turnbull
- Runners-up: (United States) Steve Denton (United States) Billie Jean King
- Score: 6–7^{(5–7)}, 7–6^{(7–5)}, 7–5

Details
- Draw: 56 (4 Q )
- Seeds: 8

Events
Singles	men	women		boys	girls
Doubles	men	women	mixed	boys	girls
WC Singles	men	women	quad
WC Doubles	men	women	quad
Legends	men	women	seniors
← 1982 ·	Wimbledon Championships	· 1984 →

Kevin Curren and Anne Smith held the title but did not defend.

John Lloyd and Wendy Turnbull defeated Steve Denton and Billie Jean King in the final, 6–7^{(5–7)}, 7–6^{(7–5)}, 7–5 to win the mixed doubles tennis title at the 1983 Wimbledon Championships.

== Seeds ==
All seeds received a bye into the second round.

1. (United States) Steve Denton / (United States) Billie Jean King (final)
2. (United Kingdom) John Lloyd / (Australia) Wendy Turnbull (champions)
3. (United States) Sherwood Stewart / (United States) JoAnne Russell (third round)
4. (Australia) Fred Stolle / (United States) Pam Shriver (semifinals)
5. (Australia) John Newcombe / (United States) Andrea Leand (second round)
6. (United States) Tom Gullikson / (United States) Kathy Jordan (quarterfinals)
7. (South Africa) Frew McMillan / (United Kingdom) Jo Durie (third round)
8. (United States) Ferdi Taygan / (United States) Barbara Jordan (third round)

Click on the seed number of a player to go to their draw section.

== Draw ==
=== Key ===
- Q = Qualifier
- WC = Wild card
- LL = Lucky loser
- Alt = Alternate
- SE = Special exempt
- PR = Protected ranking
- ITF = ITF entry
- JE = Junior exempt
- w/o = Walkover
- r = Retired
- d = Defaulted
- SR = Special ranking

=== Finals ===
Quarterfinals
1	(United States) Steve Denton (United States) Billie Jean King	6	3	6
6	(United States) Tom Gullikson (United States) Kathy Jordan	1	6	3
(South Africa) Bernard Mitton (United States) Pam Teeguarden	4	4
(United States) Buzz Strode (Hungary) Andrea Temesvári	6	6
(United States) Rodney Harmon (United States) Zina Garrison	4	6	3
4	(Australia) Fred Stolle (United States) Pam Shriver	6	4	6
(Australia) Chris Johnstone (Australia) Pam Whytcross	4	4
2	(United Kingdom) John Lloyd (Australia) Wendy Turnbull	6	6

Semifinals
1	(United States) Steve Denton (United States) Billie Jean King	6	6
(United States) Buzz Strode (Hungary) Andrea Temesvári	4	3
4	(Australia) Fred Stolle (United States) Pam Shriver	7	3	4
2	(United Kingdom) John Lloyd (Australia) Wendy Turnbull	6	6	6

Final
1	(United States) Steve Denton (United States) Billie Jean King	7^{7}	6^{5}	5
2	(United Kingdom) John Lloyd (Australia) Wendy Turnbull	6^{5}	7^{7}	7

=== Top half ===
==== Section 1 ====
First round
(United Kingdom) R Lewis (United States) M Torres	5	6	6
LL	(Colombia) A Cortes (Japan) N Sato	7	4	4
(United States) C Pasarell (United States) N Yeargin	6	3	6
(Brazil) C Motta (Brazil) C Monteiro	4	6	3
(United Kingdom) D Lloyd (United Kingdom) S Barker	6	5	9
(Chile) J Fillol (United States) S Walsh	4	7	7
(United Kingdom) M Guntrip (United States) H Ludloff	7	4	6
(United States) M Bauer (United States) K Rinaldi	5	6	2
LL	(United Kingdom) S Shaw (Australia) L Fitzgerald	6	1
(New Zealand) C Lewis (France) C Tanvier	7	6
(United States) R Van't Hof (United States) A White	4	3
(United States) F Buehning (United States) M L Piatek	6	6

Second round
1	(United States) S Denton (United States) BJ King	7	6
(United Kingdom) R Lewis (United States) M Torres	5	3
(United States) C Pasarell (United States) N Yeargin	6	3
(United Kingdom) D Lloyd (United Kingdom) S Barker	7	6
(United Kingdom) M Guntrip (United States) H Ludloff	0	6	3
(New Zealand) C Lewis (France) C Tanvier	6	2	6
(United States) F Buehning (United States) M L Piatek	3	5
6	(United States) T Gullikson (United States) K Jordan	6	7

Third round
1	(United States) S Denton (United States) BJ King	6	6
(United Kingdom) D Lloyd (United Kingdom) S Barker	1	2
(New Zealand) C Lewis (France) C Tanvier
6	(United States) T Gullikson (United States) K Jordan	w/o

Quarterfinals
1	(United States) S Denton (United States) BJ King	6	3	6
6	(United States) T Gullikson (United States) K Jordan	1	6	3

==== Section 2 ====
First round
(South Africa) R Hewitt (United Kingdom) V Wade	7	2	6
(United States) D Gitlin (United States) S Acker	5	6	4
(Australia) J Fitzgerald (United States) E Nagelsen	6	6
(United States) J Evert (United States) C Evert Lloyd	2	4
(United Kingdom) A Jarrett (United Kingdom) D Jarrett	3	6	1
(South Africa) B Mitton (United States) P Teeguarden	6	3	6
LL	(South Africa) C van Rensburg (South Africa) M Reinach	2	7	6
(United States) S Davis (United States) A Jaeger	6	6	1
(United Kingdom) J Feaver (United Kingdom) A Hobbs	5	3
(United States) C Strode (Hungary) A Temesvári	7	6
(United States) L Bourne (Romania) L Romanov	7	6	7
(United States) M Doyle (United States) K Latham	6	7	5

Second round
3	(United States) S Stewart (United States) J Russell	6	6
(South Africa) R Hewitt (United Kingdom) V Wade	4	1
(Australia) J Fitzgerald (United States) E Nagelsen	5	1
(South Africa) B Mitton (United States) P Teeguarden	7	6
LL	(South Africa) C van Rensburg (South Africa) M Reinach	2	7	3
(United States) C Strode (Hungary) A Temesvári	6	6	6
(United States) L Bourne (Romania) L Romanov
8	(United States) F Taygan (United States) B Jordan	w/o

Third round
3	(United States) S Stewart (United States) J Russell	6	6	4
(South Africa) B Mitton (United States) P Teeguarden	4	7	6
(United States) C Strode (Hungary) A Temesvári	7	6
8	(United States) F Taygan (United States) B Jordan	6	2

Quarterfinals
(South Africa) B Mitton (United States) P Teeguarden	4	4
(United States) C Strode (Hungary) A Temesvári	6	6

=== Bottom half ===
==== Section 3 ====
First round
(United States) R Harmon (United States) Z Garrison	6	6
(United Kingdom) R Drysdale (United Kingdom) K Brasher	0	4
(Australia) L Warder (Australia) A Minter	3	3
Q	(United States) J Turpin (United States) K Steinmetz	6	6
(South Africa) R Moore (South Africa) R Fairbank	3	6
(United States) E Fromm (West Germany) E Pfaff	6	7
(United States) D Ralston (Netherlands) B Stöve	4	6	3
(United Kingdom) C Dowdeswell (Switzerland) C Jolissaint	6	3	6
(United States) M De Palmer (United States) C Reynolds	4	3
Q	(United Kingdom) J Dier (Australia) B Randall	6	6
(United States) M Strode (United States) P Smith	6	6
(United States) M Estep (United States) R Casals	3	4

Second round
5	(Australia) J Newcombe (United States) A Leand	6	4	3
(United States) R Harmon (United States) Z Garrison	3	6	6
Q	(United States) J Turpin (United States) K Steinmetz	3	4
(United States) E Fromm (West Germany) E Pfaff	6	6
(United Kingdom) C Dowdeswell (Switzerland) C Jolissaint	7	6
Q	(United Kingdom) J Dier (Australia) B Randall	6	2
(United States) M Strode (United States) P Smith	1	2
4	(Australia) F Stolle (United States) P Shriver	6	6

Third round
(United States) R Harmon (United States) Z Garrison	2	6	7
(United States) E Fromm (West Germany) E Pfaff	6	3	5
(United Kingdom) C Dowdeswell (Switzerland) C Jolissaint	5	6
4	(Australia) F Stolle (United States) P Shriver	7	7

Quarterfinals
(United States) R Harmon (United States) Z Garrison	4	6	3
4	(Australia) F Stolle (United States) P Shriver	6	4	6

==== Section 4 ====
First round
(United States) V Van Patten (Canada) C Bassett	6	4	5
(Australia) D Graham (United States) E Herr	4	6	7
(Australia) O Davidson (South Africa) I Kloss	7	7
(United Kingdom) C Bradnam (United Kingdom) A Croft	5	5
(Australia) C Johnstone (Australia) P Whytcross	5	6	16
LL	(United Kingdom) M Wayman (Australia) N Gregory	7	3	14
(Brazil) G Barbosa (Brazil) P Medrado	7	6
(Australia) A Roche (Australia) J Thompson	6	1
(India) A Amritraj (United States) A Kiyomura	6	6
LL	(Australia) G Dingwall (Australia) A Tobin	4	2
LL	(Australia) M Fancutt (Australia) B Remilton	6	6
LL	(South Africa) B Levine (United States) S McInerney	3	2

Second round
7	(South Africa) F McMillan (United Kingdom) J Durie	6	6	6
(Australia) D Graham (United States) E Herr	2	7	3
(Australia) O Davidson (South Africa) I Kloss	3	2
(Australia) C Johnstone (Australia) P Whytcross	6	6
(Brazil) G Barbosa (Brazil) P Medrado	2	7	6
(India) A Amritraj (United States) A Kiyomura	6	6	1
LL	(Australia) M Fancutt (Australia) B Remilton	7	0	3
2	(United Kingdom) J Lloyd (Australia) W Turnbull	6	6	6

Third round
7	(South Africa) F McMillan (United Kingdom) J Durie	6	2	3
(Australia) C Johnstone (Australia) P Whytcross	4	6	6
(Brazil) G Barbosa (Brazil) P Medrado	5	2
2	(United Kingdom) J Lloyd (Australia) W Turnbull	7	6

Quarterfinals
(Australia) C Johnstone (Australia) P Whytcross	4	4
2	(United Kingdom) J Lloyd (Australia) W Turnbull	6	6
