= 1983 Wimbledon Championships – Women's singles =

Women's singles
- 1983 Wimbledon Championships

Final
- Champion: (United States) Martina Navratilova
- Runner-up: (United States) Andrea Jaeger
- Score: 6–0, 6–3

Details
- Draw: 128 (8Q / 8WC)
- Seeds: 16

Events
Singles	men	women		boys	girls
Doubles	men	women	mixed	boys	girls
WC Singles	men	women	quad
WC Doubles	men	women	quad
Legends	men	women	seniors
- Wimbledon Championships

Defending champion Martina Navratilova defeated Andrea Jaeger in the final, 6–0, 6–3 to win the ladies' singles tennis title at the 1983 Wimbledon Championships. It was her fourth Wimbledon singles title and sixth major singles title overall. Navratilova did not lose a set during the tournament.

Billie Jean King became the oldest major semifinalist in the Open Era at 39 years, 7 months and 9 days old. Chris Evert Lloyd's loss in the third round ended her streak of 34 consecutive major semifinals, dating back to her major debut at the 1971 US Open, and marked her career first loss at a major before the semifinals.

This was the first women's singles championship draw at Wimbledon not to include byes for players in the first round.

== Seeds ==
1. (United States) Martina Navratilova (champion)
2. (United States) Chris Evert Lloyd (third round)
3. (United States) Andrea Jaeger (final)
4. (United States) Tracy Austin (withdrew)
5. (United States) Pam Shriver (second round)
6. (West Germany) Bettina Bunge (first round)
7. (Australia) Wendy Turnbull (fourth round)
8. (Czechoslovakia) Hana Mandlíková (fourth round)
9. (West Germany) Sylvia Hanika (third round)
10. (United States) Billie Jean King (semifinals)
11. (United States) Barbara Potter (quarterfinals)
12. (Romania) Virginia Ruzici (fourth round)
13. (United Kingdom) Jo Durie (third round)
14. (Hungary) Andrea Temesvári (third round)
15. (United States) Kathy Rinaldi (fourth round)
16. (West Germany) Claudia Kohde-Kilsch (fourth round)

Click on the seed number of a player to go to their draw section.

Tracy Austin withdrew due to injury. She was replaced in the draw by lucky loser Myriam Schropp.

== Draw ==
Key

- Q = Qualifier
- WC = Wild card
- LL = Lucky loser
- Alt = Alternate
- ITF = ITF entry
- PR = Protected ranking
- SR = Special ranking
- SE = Special exempt
- JE = Junior exempt
- JR = Junior Accelerator Programme entrant
- CO = College Accelerator Programme entrant
- NG = Next Gen Accelerator Program entrant
- w/o = Walkover
- r = Retired
- d = Defaulted

=== Finals ===
Quarterfinals
1	(United States) Martina Navratilova	6	6
(South Africa) Jennifer Mundel	3	1
(United Kingdom) Virginia Wade	3	6	2
(South Africa) Yvonne Vermaak	6	2	6
11	(United States) Barbara Potter	4	1
3	(United States) Andrea Jaeger	6	6
10	(United States) Billie Jean King	7	6
(United States) Kathy Jordan	5	4

Semifinals
1	(United States) Martina Navratilova	6	6
(South Africa) Yvonne Vermaak	1	1
3	(United States) Andrea Jaeger	6	6
10	(United States) Billie Jean King	1	1

Final
1	(United States) Martina Navratilova	6	6
3	(United States) Andrea Jaeger	0	3

=== Top half ===
==== Section 1 ====
First round
1	(United States) M Navratilova	6	6
(South Africa) B Mould	1	0
(United States) S Acker	6	6
(France) C Tanvier	4	2
WC	(United Kingdom) A Croft	1	2
(Socialist Federal Republic of Yugoslavia) M Jaušovec	6	6
(Brazil) C Monteiro	2	4
(United States) E Burgin	6	6
(United States) B Jordan	6	6
(Australia) C O'Neil	3	3
(France) C Vanier	6	1	8
(United States) T Lewis	1	6	6
(Hong Kong) P Hy	6	7
(United States) A Kiyomura	1	6
(Czechoslovakia) H Suková	3	6
16	(West Germany) C Kohde-Kilsch	6	7

Second round
1	(United States) M Navratilova	7	6
(United States) S Acker	6	3
(Socialist Federal Republic of Yugoslavia) M Jaušovec	6	6
(United States) E Burgin	1	3
(United States) B Jordan	6	6
(France) C Vanier	3	2
(Hong Kong) P Hy	3	3
16	(West Germany) C Kohde-Kilsch	6	6

Third round
1	(United States) M Navratilova	6	6
(Socialist Federal Republic of Yugoslavia) M Jaušovec	2	1
(United States) B Jordan	2	3
16	(West Germany) C Kohde-Kilsch	6	6

Fourth round
1	(United States) M Navratilova	6	6
16	(West Germany) C Kohde-Kilsch	1	2

==== Section 2 ====
First round
9	(West Germany) S Hanika	6	6
(United States) B Bowes	3	2
(South Africa) R Fairbank	6	6	6
(United States) K Shaefer	7	2	0
LL	(United States) L Bernstein	4	0
Q	(Australia) B Randall	6	6
Q	(Australia) N Gregory	1	4
(South Africa) J Mundel	6	6
(United States) A-M Fernandez	7	3	0
(France) C Suire	6	6	6
WC	(United Kingdom) K Brasher	2	1
(United States) L Allen	6	6
WC	(South Africa) R Mentz	7	6	6
(United States) H Ludloff	6	7	4
WC	(United Kingdom) R Einy	5	3
8	(Czechoslovakia) H Mandlíková	7	6

Second round
9	(West Germany) S Hanika	3	6	6
(South Africa) R Fairbank	6	2	3
Q	(Australia) B Randall	1	1
(South Africa) J Mundel	6	6
(France) C Suire	2	4
(United States) L Allen	6	6
WC	(South Africa) R Mentz	2	3
8	(Czechoslovakia) H Mandlíková	6	6

Third round
9	(West Germany) S Hanika	6	4	3
(South Africa) J Mundel	2	6	6
(United States) L Allen	1	3
8	(Czechoslovakia) H Mandlíková	6	6

Fourth round
(South Africa) J Mundel	5	6	6
8	(Czechoslovakia) H Mandlíková	7	4	4

==== Section 3 ====
First round
LL	(West Germany) M Schropp	3	3
(United States) B Hallquist	6	6
(United States) A Leand	6	6
(United States) P Smith	1	3
(Italy) R Reggi	3	6	7
LL	(United States) M Schillig	6	3	5
(United Kingdom) V Wade	1	7	6
(Australia) A Tobin	6	5	4
(West Germany) E Pfaff	7	6
LL	(Australia) B Remilton	5	2
(United States) A Holton	6	5
(United States) Z Garrison	7	7
WC	(United Kingdom) C Drury	6	6	1
(United States) T Mochizuki	7	4	6
(Czechoslovakia) Y Brzáková	4	2
13	(United Kingdom) J Durie	6	6

Second round
(United States) B Hallquist	6	6	4
(United States) A Leand	7	4	6
(Italy) R Reggi	1	2
(United Kingdom) V Wade	6	6
(West Germany) E Pfaff	3	7	6
(United States) Z Garrison	6	6	4
(United States) T Mochizuki	4	0
13	(United Kingdom) J Durie	6	6

Third round
(United States) A Leand	6	6	2
(United Kingdom) V Wade	3	7	6
(West Germany) E Pfaff	7	7
13	(United Kingdom) J Durie	6	5

Fourth round
(United Kingdom) V Wade	3	7	7
(West Germany) E Pfaff	6	6	5

==== Section 4 ====
First round
12	(Romania) V Ruzici	6	6
(Sweden) C Lindqvist	0	2
(United Kingdom) D Jarrett	1	1
(United States) N Yeargin	6	6
(United States) J Hepner	0	1
(Italy) S Simmonds	6	6
Q	(United States) L Spain	4	2
WC	(United Kingdom) A Brown	6	6
WC	(United Kingdom) S Gomer	6	2	2
(South Africa) Y Vermaak	4	6	6
(United States) K Sands	7	6
(United States) L Forood	6	4
(Czechoslovakia) I Budařová	6	6
(Czechoslovakia) R Tomanová-Roth	1	3
(United States) P Fendick	2	2
5	(United States) P Shriver	6	6

Second round
12	(Romania) V Ruzici	6	6
(United States) N Yeargin	1	4
(Italy) S Simmonds	6	6
WC	(United Kingdom) A Brown	3	4
(South Africa) Y Vermaak	7	1	6
(United States) K Sands	6	6	3
(Czechoslovakia) I Budařová	2	7	6
5	(United States) P Shriver	6	6	4

Third round
12	(Romania) V Ruzici	6	3	6
(Italy) S Simmonds	1	6	2
(South Africa) Y Vermaak	5	6	6
(Czechoslovakia) I Budařová	7	4	2

Fourth round
12	(Romania) V Ruzici	3	2
(South Africa) Y Vermaak	6	6

=== Bottom half ===
==== Section 5 ====
First round
6	(West Germany) B Bunge	6	6	9
(Switzerland) C Jolissaint	3	7	11
(United States) B Bramblett	5	2
(Australia) A Minter	7	6
Q	(Sweden) E Ekblom	4	7	3
(United States) A Henricksson	6	5	6
(United States) L Bonder	6	7
(West Germany) C Dries	3	5
(Romania) L Romanov	3	6
(United States) C Benjamin	6	7
(United States) H Crowe	5	4
(United States) J Davis	7	6
(United States) M Torres	6	6
(United States) J Preyer	4	2
(Brazil) P Medrado	5	1
11	(United States) B Potter	7	6

Second round
(Switzerland) C Jolissaint	3	3
(Australia) A Minter	6	6
(United States) A Henricksson	3	6
(United States) L Bonder	6	7
(United States) C Benjamin	6	6	11
(United States) J Davis	2	7	9
(United States) M Torres	1	4
11	(United States) B Potter	6	6

Third round
(Australia) A Minter	1	3
(United States) L Bonder	6	6
(United States) C Benjamin	7	2	1
11	(United States) B Potter	6	6	6

Fourth round
(United States) L Bonder	5	4
11	(United States) B Potter	7	6

==== Section 6 ====
First round
14	(Hungary) A Temesvári	6	6
(United States) V Nelson	0	1
(Bulgaria) M Maleeva	6	6
(United Kingdom) S Barker	3	2
(United States) C Reynolds	4	4
(United States) S Walsh	6	6
(United States) J Russell	3	5
(Canada) C Bassett	6	7
(United States) S Collins	6	6
(United States) K Steinmetz	3	0
(United States) R Blount	6	2
(Australia) S Leo	7	6
Q	(Australia) E Minter	7	5	3
(United States) P Casale	5	7	6
Q	(United States) S Rimes	1	6
3	(United States) A Jaeger	6	7

Second round
14	(Hungary) A Temesvári	7	6
(Bulgaria) M Maleeva	5	4
(United States) S Walsh	2	3
(Canada) C Bassett	6	6
(United States) S Collins	2	3
(Australia) S Leo	6	6
(United States) P Casale	3	2
3	(United States) A Jaeger	6	6

Third round
14	(Hungary) A Temesvári	3	6
(Canada) C Bassett	6	7
(Australia) S Leo	3	2
3	(United States) A Jaeger	6	6

Fourth round
(Canada) C Bassett	4	3
3	(United States) A Jaeger	6	6

==== Section 7 ====
First round
7	(Australia) W Turnbull	6	6
(Australia) D Fromholtz	1	1
(United States) A White	6	6
(Japan) E Inoue	1	3
(United States) K Latham	6	7	7
(United States) P Teeguarden	7	6	5
(United States) W White	7	6
WC	(United Kingdom) J Salmon	6	4
(United States) M-L Piatek	6	6	3
(United States) R Casals	3	7	6
(United States) L Antonoplis	4	2
(Switzerland) P Delhees	6	6
(United States) E Herr	4	6	6
(United States) T Phelps	6	2	1
(Australia) E Sayers	5	3
10	(United States) BJ King	7	6

Second round
7	(Australia) W Turnbull	6	6
(United States) A White	3	3
(United States) K Latham	6	1
(United States) W White	7	6
(United States) R Casals	6	3	6
(Switzerland) P Delhees	3	6	2
(United States) E Herr	7	2	6
10	(United States) BJ King	6	6	8

Third round
7	(Australia) W Turnbull	6	6
(United States) W White	3	4
(United States) R Casals	3	4
10	(United States) BJ King	6	6

Fourth round
7	(Australia) W Turnbull	5	3
10	(United States) BJ King	7	6

==== Section 8 ====
First round
15	(United States) K Rinaldi	4	6	6
(Czechoslovakia) K Skronská	6	1	4
(Sweden) L Sandin	6	6
(Sweden) C Jexell	1	4
(Switzerland) C Pasquale	6	6
Q	(Australia) D Freeman	2	3
(United States) J Klitch	4	7	3
(United States) E Nagelsen	6	6	6
(United States) K Jordan	6	6
Q	(United States) J Golder	0	0
(Czechoslovakia) M Skuherská	1	6	4
(South Korea) D-h Lee	6	4	6
(Netherlands) M Mesker	6	7
(United Kingdom) A Hobbs	3	5
(United States) A Moulton	2	1
2	(United States) C Evert Lloyd	6	6

Second round
15	(United States) K Rinaldi	6	6
(Sweden) L Sandin	4	3
(Switzerland) C Pasquale	3	5
(United States) E Nagelsen	6	7
(United States) K Jordan	6	6
(South Korea) D-h Lee	1	1
(Netherlands) M Mesker	4	2
2	(United States) C Evert Lloyd	6	6

Third round
15	(United States) K Rinaldi	6	6	6
(United States) E Nagelsen	0	7	4
(United States) K Jordan	6	7^{7}
2	(United States) C Evert Lloyd	1	6^{2}

Fourth round
15	(United States) K Rinaldi	2	4
(United States) K Jordan	6	6

Preceded by 1983 French Open – Women's singles	Grand Slam women's singles	Succeeded by 1983 US Open – Women's singles
