= Tennis at the 1984 Summer Olympics – Women's singles =

Women's singles
- Tennis at the 1984 Summer Olympics

Events
Singles	men	women
← 1968 ·	Summer Olympics	· 1988 →

Below are the complete results of the women's singles tennis competition during the 1984 Summer Olympics in Los Angeles, when tennis was re-introduced as a demonstration sport.

== Seeds ==
1. Kathy Horvath (USA) (quarterfinals)
2. Andrea Jaeger (USA) (second round)
3. Laura Arraya (PER) (first round)
4. Catherine Tanvier (FRA) (semifinals)
5. Andrea Leand (USA) (second round)
6. Raffaella Reggi (ITA) (semifinals)
7. Sabrina Goleš (YUG) (final)
8. Steffi Graf (FRG) (champion)

== Draw ==
=== Finals ===
Semifinals
7	Sabrina Goleš (YUG)	6	6
4	Catherine Tanvier (FRA)	2	2
6	Raffaella Reggi (ITA)	6^{1}	4
8	Steffi Graf (FRG)	7^{7}	6

Final
7	Sabrina Goleš (YUG)	6	3	4
8	Steffi Graf (FRG)	1	6	6

=== Top half ===
First round
1	K Horvath (USA)	6	6
P Huber (AUT)	3	3
M Schropp (FRG)	6	7
G Fernández (PUR)	3	5
M Groat (CAN)	0	3
P Hy (HKG)	6	6
S Lee (KOR)	0	2
7	S Goleš (YUG)	6	6
4	C Tanvier (FRA)	6^{8}	7	6
G Rush (USA)	7^{10}	5	1
C Anderholm (SWE)	3	1
J Hetherington (CAN)	6	6
M-c Hsu (TPE)	0	2
A Kanellopoulou (GRE)	6	6
S Schilder (NED)	4	2
5	A Leand (USA)	6	6

Second round
1	K Horvath (USA)	6	6
M Schropp (FRG)	2	2
P Hy (HKG)	4	6	7
7	S Goleš (YUG)	6	4	9
4	C Tanvier (FRA)	2	6	6
J Hetherington (CAN)	6	2	4
A Kanellopoulou (GRE)	6	6
5	A Leand (USA)	3	3

Quarterfinals
1	K Horvath (USA)	2	6^{2}
7	S Goleš (YUG)	6	7^{7}
4	C Tanvier (FRA)	6	6
A Kanellopoulou (GRE)	2	1

Semifinals
7	S Goleš (YUG)	6	6
4	C Tanvier (FRA)	2	2

=== Bottom half ===
First round
6	R Reggi (ITA)	6	6
R Einy (GBR)	0	0
M Paz (ARG)	2	3
A Brown (GBR)	6	6
E Minter (AUS)	5	2
L Drescher (SUI)	7	6
R Šašak (YUG)	1	6	6
3	L Arraya (PER)	6	1	1
8	S Graf (FRG)	6	7
E Inoue (JPN)	3	5
A Kijimuta (JPN)	3	2
AM Cecchini (ITA)	6	6
S Campos (BRA)	3	5
P Paradis (FRA)	6	7
T Scheuer-Larsen (DEN)	6	2	3
2	A Jaeger (USA)	2	6	6

Second round
6	R Reggi (ITA)	6	0	6
A Brown (GBR)	2	6	3
L Drescher (SUI)	6	6
R Šašak (YUG)	1	3
8	S Graf (FRG)	0	6	6
AM Cecchini (ITA)	6	3	4
P Paradis (FRA)	w/o
2	A Jaeger (USA)

Quarterfinals
6	R Reggi (ITA)	6	6
L Drescher (SUI)	1	2
8	S Graf (FRG)	6	6
P Paradis (FRA)	0	1

Semifinals
6	R Reggi (ITA)	6^{1}	4
8	S Graf (FRG)	7^{7}	6
