= 1983 Wimbledon Championships – Men's singles =

Men's singles
- 1983 Wimbledon Championships

Final
- Champion: (United States) John McEnroe
- Runner-up: (New Zealand) Chris Lewis
- Score: 6–2, 6–2, 6–2

Details
- Draw: 128 (16Q / 8WC)
- Seeds: 16

Events
Singles	men	women		boys	girls
Doubles	men	women	mixed	boys	girls
WC Singles	men	women	quad
WC Doubles	men	women	quad
Legends	men	women	seniors
- Wimbledon Championships

John McEnroe defeated Chris Lewis in the final, 6–2, 6–2, 6–2 to win the gentlemen's singles tennis title at the 1983 Wimbledon Championships. It was his second Wimbledon singles title and fifth major singles title overall.

Jimmy Connors was the defending champion, but lost in the fourth round to Kevin Curren. The loss also meant that Connors hadn’t reached the quarterfinals for the first time since the 1973 French Open, a span of 27-consecutive grand slam tournaments reaching at least the quarterfinals.

== Seeds ==
1. (United States) Jimmy Connors (fourth round)
2. (United States) John McEnroe (champion)
3. (Czechoslovakia) Ivan Lendl (semifinals)
4. (Argentina) Guillermo Vilas (first round)
5. (Sweden) Mats Wilander (third round)
6. (United States) Gene Mayer (withdrew)
7. (Argentina) José Luis Clerc (first round)
8. (United States) Vitas Gerulaitis (second round)
9. (United States) Steve Denton (first round)
10. (United States) Jimmy Arias (withdrew)
11. (United States) Johan Kriek (third round)
12. (South Africa) Kevin Curren (semifinals)
13. (United States) Brian Gottfried (fourth round)
14. (United States) Bill Scanlon (fourth round)
15. (United States) Hank Pfister (second round)
16. (United States) Tim Mayotte (quarterfinals)

Click on the seed number of a player to go to their draw section.

Gene Mayer and Jimmy Arias withdrew due to injury. They were replaced in the draw by lucky loser Bruce Kleege and Qualifier Scott Davis respectively.

== Draw ==
Key

- Q = Qualifier
- WC = Wild card
- LL = Lucky loser
- Alt = Alternate
- ITF = ITF entry
- PR = Protected ranking
- SR = Special ranking
- SE = Special exempt
- JE = Junior exempt
- JR = Junior Accelerator Programme entrant
- CO = College Accelerator Programme entrant
- NG = Next Gen Accelerator Program entrant
- w/o = Walkover
- r = Retired
- d = Defaulted

=== Finals ===
Quarterfinals
12	(South Africa) Kevin Curren	4	7	6	7
16	(United States) Tim Mayotte	6	6	2	6
(New Zealand) Chris Lewis	6	6	6	7
(United States) Mel Purcell	7	0	4	6
(United States) Roscoe Tanner	5	6	3
3	(Czechoslovakia) Ivan Lendl	7	7	6
(United States) Sandy Mayer	3	5	0
2	(United States) John McEnroe	6	7	6

Semifinals
12	(South Africa) Kevin Curren	7	4	6	7	6
(New Zealand) Chris Lewis	6	6	7	6	8
3	(Czechoslovakia) Ivan Lendl	6	4	4
2	(United States) John McEnroe	7	6	6

Final
(New Zealand) Chris Lewis	2	2	2
2	(United States) John McEnroe	6	6	6

=== Top half ===
==== Section 1 ====
First round
1	(United States) J Connors	6	7	6
(South Africa) E Edwards	4	5	3
(United States) L Bourne	6	6	4	3	2
(Australia) W Masur	4	4	6	6	6
(United States) V Van Patten	4	0	6	5
(Sweden) H Sundström	6	6	2	7
(Sweden) S Edberg	6	7	6
(France) C Roger-Vasselin	2	6	1
(Australia) B Drewett	6	6	6
(Spain) A Tous	3	1	1
(South Africa) R Venter	2	3	6	6
(United States) R Harmon	6	6	3	7
(Sweden) H Simonsson	6	3	2	6	3
(Spain) S Casal	3	6	6	3	6
(United States) J Borowiak	7	3	5	0^{r}
12	(South Africa) K Curren	6	6	7	1

Second round
1	(United States) J Connors	6	7	6
(Australia) W Masur	4	6	0
(Sweden) H Sundström	2	7	7	4	8
(Sweden) S Edberg	6	6	6	6	6
(Australia) B Drewett	2	4	4
(United States) R Harmon	6	6	6
(Spain) S Casal	6	4	3
12	(South Africa) K Curren	7	6	6

Third round
1	(United States) J Connors	6	7	6
(Sweden) H Sundström	1	6	2
(United States) R Harmon	4	5	2
12	(South Africa) K Curren	6	7	6

Fourth round
1	(United States) J Connors	3	7	3	6
12	(South Africa) K Curren	6	6	6	7

==== Section 2 ====
First round
16	(United States) T Mayotte	7	6	6
(United States) M Dickson	5	3	3
(Sweden) A Järryd	4	6	3
Q	(United States) A Andrews	6	7	6
(United States) B Teacher	6	6	2	6
(Brazil) M Hocevar	4	0	6	4
(United Kingdom) C Mottram	6	4	6	2
(Poland) W Fibak	4	6	7	6
LL	(India) S Menon	2	1	2
(United States) To Gullikson	6	6	6
(Mexico) R Ramírez	6	1	6	2^{r}
(Brazil) C Motta	7	6	2	3
(Spain) J Avendaño	3	4	2
LL	(Australia) J McCurdy	6	6	6
(Italy) C Panatta	6	6	6
7	(Argentina) JL Clerc	1	4	2

Second round
16	(United States) T Mayotte	6	6	6
Q	(United States) A Andrews	1	2	2
(United States) B Teacher	7	2	4	7	6
(Poland) W Fibak	6	6	6	5	1
(United States) To Gullikson	6	6	4	4
(Brazil) C Motta	3	7	6	6
LL	(Australia) J McCurdy	7	6	7
(Italy) C Panatta	6	3	6

Third round
16	(United States) T Mayotte	7	6	6	6
(United States) B Teacher	6	4	7	3
(Brazil) C Motta	0	4	6	1
LL	(Australia) J McCurdy	6	6	3	6

Fourth round
16	(United States) T Mayotte	6	6	6
LL	(Australia) J McCurdy	0	2	4

==== Section 3 ====
First round
4	(Argentina) G Vilas	6	7	6	5	2
(Nigeria) N Odizor	3	5	7	7	6
Q	(United States) P Fleming	7	6	6
WC	(United Kingdom) J Bates	6	3	2
(Sweden) M Tideman	5	4	5
(France) L Courteau	7	6	7
(United States) B Foxworth	6	2	5	1
WC	(United Kingdom) A Jarrett	4	6	7	6
WC	(United Kingdom) C Bradnam	4	4	6
Q	(Australia) C Fancutt	6	6	7
(United States) M Bauer	7	7	7
(West Germany) D Keretić	5	5	5
(France) G Forget	2	2	6	2
Q	(Australia) B Dyke	6	6	3	6
(New Zealand) C Lewis	6	4	7	4	6
9	(United States) S Denton	4	6	6	6	3

Second round
(Nigeria) N Odizor	6	4	6	6
Q	(United States) P Fleming	4	6	4	2
(France) L Courteau	6	7	6
WC	(United Kingdom) A Jarrett	2	5	3
Q	(Australia) C Fancutt	4	4	0
(United States) M Bauer	6	6	6
Q	(Australia) B Dyke	6	1	3
(New Zealand) C Lewis	7	6	6

Third round
(Nigeria) N Odizor	3	7	6	3	6
(France) L Courteau	6	6	4	6	3
(United States) M Bauer	4	6	5	7	4
(New Zealand) C Lewis	6	3	7	6	6

Fourth round
(Nigeria) N Odizor	1	3	3
(New Zealand) C Lewis	6	6	6

==== Section 4 ====
First round
13	(United States) B Gottfried	6	6	6
(Israel) S Glickstein	1	4	4
(Czechoslovakia) L Pimek	2	1	1
(United States) M Doyle	6	6	6
Q	(United States) J Turpin	1	6	6	6
(United States) A Giammalva	6	7	3	7
(United States) E Fromm	4	3	4
(Brazil) J Soares	6	6	6
(United States) M Mitchell	6	7	7	4	10
WC	(United Kingdom) S Bale	7	6	5	6	12
(United States) T Wilkison	2	6	2	1
(United States) M Purcell	6	4	6	6
(West Germany) A Maurer	3	6	6	5	6
LL	(United States) M Brunnberg	6	1	4	7	4
(United States) V Amaya	6	6	6
LL	(United States) B Kleege	4	3	4

Second round
13	(United States) B Gottfried	7	4	7	6
(United States) M Doyle	5	6	6	4
(United States) A Giammalva	6	7	6	4
(Brazil) J Soares	7	6	7	6
WC	(United Kingdom) S Bale	6	4	3
(United States) M Purcell	7	6	6
(West Germany) A Maurer	6	6	7
(United States) V Amaya	3	4	6

Third round
13	(United States) B Gottfried	7	6	6
(Brazil) J Soares	6	2	2
(United States) M Purcell	5	6	6	6
(West Germany) A Maurer	7	3	2	2

Fourth round
13	(United States) B Gottfried	6	3	3	2
(United States) M Purcell	4	6	6	6

=== Bottom half ===
==== Section 5 ====
First round
5	(Sweden) M Wilander	6	6	4	6	6
(Australia) J Fitzgerald	4	1	6	7	4
Q	(Australia) R Frawley	6	6	6	7	7
Q	(South Africa) C Viljoen	7	2	7	5	9
(Sweden) T Högstedt	7	3	1	6
(Australia) J Alexander	6	6	6	7
(Sweden) J Gunnarsson	4	3	2
(United States) R Tanner	6	6	6
(Australia) C Johnstone	6	1	6	6	4
(United States) R Van't Hof	4	6	3	7	6
Q	(South Africa) D Visser	3	6	2	6	5
(France) H Leconte	6	4	6	4	7
(United States) N Saviano	7	6	6
WC	(United Kingdom) J Smith	5	3	2
(United States) S Giammalva	4	3	2
11	(United States) J Kriek	6	6	6

Second round
5	(Sweden) M Wilander	6	6	6
Q	(South Africa) C Viljoen	3	2	1
(Australia) J Alexander	2	6	6	3
(United States) R Tanner	6	7	4	6
(United States) R Van't Hof	3	6	4	6	6
(France) H Leconte	6	4	6	3	2
(United States) N Saviano	4	6	7	3	2
11	(United States) J Kriek	6	3	5	6	6

Third round
5	(Sweden) M Wilander	7	5	3	4
(United States) R Tanner	6	7	6	6
(United States) R Van't Hof	6	7	6
11	(United States) J Kriek	3	6	1

Fourth round
(United States) R Tanner	6	6	6
(United States) R Van't Hof	2	3	3

==== Section 6 ====
First round
15	(United States) H Pfister	6	6	3	6
(Czechoslovakia) T Šmid	3	4	6	3
(Brazil) G Barbosa	7	4	6	3
(Chile) R Acuña	6	6	7	6
(United States) C Wittus	4	4	6	4
(United States) F Buehning	6	6	3	6
(Brazil) J Góes	0	0	3
(Australia) P Cash	6	6	6
(Australia) C Miller	6	6	2	6	6
WC	(United Kingdom) J Lloyd	1	7	6	3	1
(Czechoslovakia) S Birner	2	1	3
Q	(Switzerland) J Hlasek	6	6	6
(United States) T Waltke	6	3	2	6	2
(United States) S Smith	4	6	6	3	0^{r}
Q	(South Africa) B Mitton	6	1	0
3	(Czechoslovakia) I Lendl	7	6	6

Second round
15	(United States) H Pfister	6	6	6	6	4
(Chile) R Acuña	3	7	7	4	6
(United States) F Buehning	3	0	2
(Australia) P Cash	6	6	6
(Australia) C Miller	4	4	7	6	1
Q	(Switzerland) J Hlasek	6	6	6	3	6
(United States) T Waltke	4	2	3
3	(Czechoslovakia) I Lendl	6	6	6

Third round
(Chile) R Acuña	3	4	4
(Australia) P Cash	6	6	6
Q	(Switzerland) J Hlasek	1	2	7	4
3	(Czechoslovakia) I Lendl	6	6	6	6

Fourth round
(Australia) P Cash	4	6	1
3	(Czechoslovakia) I Lendl	6	7	6

==== Section 7 ====
First round
8	(United States) V Gerulaitis	5	7	7	5	6
(India) R Krishnan	7	5	6	7	3
WC	(India) V Amritraj	3	4	6
(Australia) M Edmondson	6	6	7
WC	(United Kingdom) R Lewis	6	6	6	4
Q	(United States) M Leach	7	2	7	6
Q	(United States) E Korita	1	6	4	7	7
(Australia) P McNamee	6	3	6	6	9
Q	(Australia) W Hampson	6	3	7	4
(United States) M De Palmer	7	6	5	6
(United States) P DuPré	3	6	4
(Sweden) S Simonsson	6	7	6
(United States) M Strode	4	6	3	6	2
(Italy) G Ocleppo	6	3	6	3	6
(United States) A Mayer	6	6	6
Q	(United States) S Davis	2	4	2

Second round
8	(United States) V Gerulaitis	6	5	5
(Australia) M Edmondson	7	7	7
Q	(United States) M Leach	6	3	7	6	6
(Australia) P McNamee	4	6	6	7	3
(United States) M De Palmer	6	6	6
(Sweden) S Simonsson	4	4	3
(Italy) G Ocleppo	6	2	6	7	3
(United States) A Mayer	7	6	3	6	6

Third round
(Australia) M Edmondson	3	6	4	6	4
Q	(United States) M Leach	6	3	6	4	6
(United States) M De Palmer	6	2	1
(United States) A Mayer	7	6	6

Fourth round
Q	(United States) M Leach	1	6	1
(United States) A Mayer	6	7	6

==== Section 8 ====
First round
14	(United States) Bill Scanlon	7	6	7
(France) Gilles Moretton	6	3	6
(United States) Chip Hooper	6	6	6
(Sweden) Per Hjertquist	2	4	4
(United States) Tom Cain	1	0^{r}
Q	(United States) Tim Gullikson	6	3
(Netherlands) Michiel Schapers	2	2	4
(West Germany) Peter Elter	6	6	6
Q	(United States) John Sadri	5	7	1	5
(United States) Drew Gitlin	7	6	6	7
(New Zealand) Russell Simpson	6	3	3	3
(United States) Brad Gilbert	4	6	6	6
(Chile) Jaime Fillol	3	1	6	4
(Romania) Florin Segărceanu	6	6	1	6
(United States) Ben Testerman	4	6	2
2	(United States) John McEnroe	6	7	6

Second round
14	(United States) W Scanlon	7	6	7
(United States) C Hooper	6	0	6
Q	(United States) Ti Gullikson	5	6	6	6
(West Germany) P Elter	7	1	4	4
(United States) D Gitlin	7	3	5	5
(United States) B Gilbert	6	6	7	7
(Romania) F Segărceanu	6	2	3	3
2	(United States) J McEnroe	4	6	6	6

Third round
14	(United States) W Scanlon	6	6	6
Q	(United States) Ti Gullikson	4	4	3
(United States) B Gilbert	2	2	2
2	(United States) J McEnroe	6	6	6

Fourth round
14	(United States) W Scanlon	5	6	6
2	(United States) J McEnroe	7	7	7

Preceded by 1983 French Open	Grand Slams; Men's Singles	Succeeded by 1983 US Open
