= Carlos Chabalgoity =

Brazilian tennis player

- Full name: Carlos Eduardo Chabalgoity
- Country (sports): Brazil
- Born: 2 February 1965 (age 61)

Singles
- Career record: 2–2
- Highest ranking: No. 287 (12 Nov 1984)

Grand Slam singles results
- Wimbledon: Q1 (1983)

Doubles
- Career record: 1–2
- Highest ranking: No. 353 (23 Jul 1984)

Carlos Eduardo Chabalgoity (born 2 February 1965) is a Brazilian former professional tennis player.

Known as "Chapecó", Chabalgoity is a native of Brasília and a two-time winner of the junior Orange Bowl tournament, for the 14s and under in 1978, then 16s and under in 1981.

Chabalgoity played collegiate tennis for Anderson College in South Carolina.

On the professional tour, Chabalgoity had a best singles ranking of 287 in the world and featured in the qualifying draw for the 1983 Wimbledon Championships. He was a Grand Prix quarter-finalist at Itaparica in 1983.

In 2014, amidst a player boycott, he took over the captaincy of the Brazil Davis Cup team for a tie against Paraguay.

Chabalgoity's younger sister Cláudia competed on the WTA Tour.
