= Tennis at the 1984 Summer Olympics =

- Date: July–August 1984
- Edition: 9
- Surface: Hard
- Location: Los Angeles Tennis Center, Los Angeles

Champions

Men's singles
- Stefan Edberg; Sweden

Women's singles
- Steffi Graf; West Germany
← 1968 ·	Summer Olympics	· 1988 →

Tennis returned to the Summer Olympic Games as a demonstration sport for the second time in 60 years at the 1984 Summer Olympics in Los Angeles, California, United States. It would become an official sport 4 years later at the 1988 Summer Olympics.

Two events (men's and women's singles) were contested at these Games. The competition venue was the Los Angeles Tennis Center at the University of California, Los Angeles (UCLA). Each event had 32 players, and players under 21 years old were eligible to enter the tournament.

== Results ==
Event	1st place	2nd place	3rd place
Men's singles	Stefan Edberg; Sweden	Francisco Maciel; Mexico	Jimmy Arias; United States
Men's singles	Stefan Edberg; Sweden	Francisco Maciel; Mexico	Paolo Canè; Italy
Women's singles	Steffi Graf; West Germany	Sabrina Goleš; Yugoslavia	Raffaella Reggi; Italy
Women's singles	Steffi Graf; West Germany	Sabrina Goleš; Yugoslavia	Catherine Tanvier; France

== See also ==
- Tennis at the Friendship Games
