= Annette Gulley =

Australian tennis player

- Country (sports): Australia
- Born: 27 February 1964 (age 61) Sydney, Australia
- Prize money: US$ 19,014

Doubles

Grand Slam doubles results
- Australian Open: 1R (1983, 1985)
- French Open: 1R (1985)
- Wimbledon: 1R (1981)

Annette "Dolly" Gulley (born 27 February 1964) is an Australian former tennis player who won the Swedish Open in 1984.

Gulley was born in Sydney, and trained at the Australian Institute of Sport.

== Playing career ==
Gulley was Australian CBA Champion in her age group from 1976 to 1979 and New South Wales Under-18 Champion in 1980. In 1982, as a junior, she and compatriot Kim Staunton won the Australian Open girls' doubles.

She won the women's Swedish Open in 1984, defeating Carin Anderholm.
