= 1983 Wimbledon Championships – Men's doubles =

Men's doubles
- 1983 Wimbledon Championships

Final
- Champions: (United States) Peter Fleming (United States) John McEnroe
- Runners-up: (United States) Tim Gullikson (United States) Tom Gullikson
- Score: 6–4, 6–3, 6–4

Details
- Draw: 64 (5 Q / 5 WC )
- Seeds: 16

Events
Singles	men	women		boys	girls
Doubles	men	women	mixed	boys	girls
WC Singles	men	women	quad
WC Doubles	men	women	quad
Legends	men	women	seniors
← 1982 ·	Wimbledon Championships	· 1984 →

Peter McNamara and Paul McNamee were the defending champions, but McNamara did not compete. McNamee played with Brian Gottfried but lost in the quarterfinals to Anders Järryd and Hans Simonsson.

Peter Fleming and John McEnroe defeated Tim and Tom Gullikson in the final, 6–4, 6–3, 6–4 to win the gentlemen's doubles title at the 1983 Wimbledon Championships.

== Seeds ==
1. (United States) Peter Fleming / (United States) John McEnroe (champions)
2. (South Africa) Kevin Curren / (United States) Steve Denton (semifinals)
3. (United States) Brian Gottfried / (Australia) Paul McNamee (quarterfinals)
4. (Australia) Mark Edmondson / (United States) Sherwood Stewart (first round)
5. n/a
6. (Sweden) Anders Järryd / (Sweden) Hans Simonsson (semifinals)
7. (United States) Tim Gullikson / (United States) Tom Gullikson (final)
8. (United States) Fritz Buehning / (United States) Brian Teacher (third round)
9. (United States) Victor Amaya / (United States) Hank Pfister (first round)
10. (Australia) John Alexander / (Australia) John Fitzgerald (quarterfinals)
11. (United States) Sandy Mayer / (United States) Ferdi Taygan (third round)
12. (Australia) Broderick Dyke / (Australia) Rod Frawley (first round)
13. (United States) Andy Andrews / (United States) John Sadri (first round)
14. (United States) Chip Hooper / (United States) Peter Rennert (first round)
15. (United States) Tracy Delatte / (South Africa) Johan Kriek (first round)
16. (Sweden) Jan Gunnarsson / (United States) Mike Leach (first round)

Click on the seed number of a player to go to their draw section.

== Draw ==
=== Key ===
- Q = Qualifier
- WC = Wild card
- LL = Lucky loser
- Alt = Alternate
- ITF = ITF entry
- PR = Protected ranking
- SR = Special ranking
- SE = Special exempt
- JE = Junior exempt
- JR = Junior Accelerator Programme entrant
- CO = College Accelerator Programme entrant
- NG = Next Gen Accelerator Program entrant
- w/o = Walkover
- r = Retired
- d = Defaulted

=== Finals ===
Quarterfinals
1	(United States) Peter Fleming (United States) John McEnroe	4	6	6	6
10	(Australia) John Alexander (Australia) John Fitzgerald	6	1	4	3
3	(United States) Brian Gottfried (Australia) Paul McNamee	6	6	6	5	2
6	(Sweden) Anders Järryd (Sweden) Hans Simonsson	0	2	7	7	6
7	(United States) Tim Gullikson (United States) Tom Gullikson	7	6	6
LL	(United States) Sammy Giammalva (Sweden) Henrik Sundström	6	3	4
(United States) Mike Bauer (France) Gilles Moretton	4	7	7	6	7
2	(South Africa) Kevin Curren (United States) Steve Denton	6	6	6	7	9

Semifinals
1	(United States) Peter Fleming (United States) John McEnroe	6	6	6
6	(Sweden) Anders Järryd (Sweden) Hans Simonsson	2	2	4
7	(United States) Tim Gullikson (United States) Tom Gullikson	7	6	7	6
2	(South Africa) Kevin Curren (United States) Steve Denton	6	7	6	3

Final
1	(United States) Peter Fleming (United States) John McEnroe	6	6	6
7	(United States) Tim Gullikson (United States) Tom Gullikson	4	3	4

=== Top half ===
==== Section 1 ====
First round
1	(United States) P Fleming (United States) J McEnroe	6	6	6
Q	(United Kingdom) C Bradnam (United Kingdom) D Lloyd	4	4	3
(Italy) G Marchetti (Italy) V Vattuone	6	3	6	5
Q	(United States) C Cox (Switzerland) J Hlasek	4	6	7	7
LL	(South Africa) M Myburg (South Africa) C van Rensburg	6	7	7	3	5
(United States) M Dickson (Poland) W Fibak	7	6	6	6	7
(South Africa) B Mitton (South Africa) R Moore	6	6	5	3	12
12	(Australia) B Dyke (Australia) R Frawley	4	4	7	6	10
10	(Australia) J Alexander (Australia) J Fitzgerald	7	6	4	7
(United States) G Haynes (Finland) L Palin	6	3	6	6
(Spain) S Casal (Brazil) M Hocevar	6	1	5	7	6
WC	(Australia) J Newcombe (Australia) A Roche	3	6	7	6	3
(United Kingdom) J Lloyd (United States) B Manson	6	7	6
(United Kingdom) J Feaver (United Kingdom) R Lewis	3	6	3
(United States) E Fromm (United States) D Gitlin	3	0	6	3
8	(United States) F Buehning (United States) B Teacher	6	6	3	6

Second round
1	(United States) P Fleming (United States) J McEnroe	7	7	6
Q	(United States) C Cox (Switzerland) J Hlasek	6	5	3
(United States) M Dickson (Poland) W Fibak	5	4	6
(South Africa) B Mitton (South Africa) R Moore	7	6	7
10	(Australia) J Alexander (Australia) J Fitzgerald	6	7	7
(Spain) S Casal (Brazil) M Hocevar	4	6	6
(United Kingdom) J Lloyd (United States) B Manson	3	4	6
8	(United States) F Buehning (United States) B Teacher	6	6	7

Third round
1	(United States) P Fleming (United States) J McEnroe	6	6	6
(South Africa) B Mitton (South Africa) R Moore	4	2	4
10	(Australia) J Alexander (Australia) J Fitzgerald	4	7	7	6
8	(United States) F Buehning (United States) B Teacher	6	5	6	4

Quarterfinals
1	(United States) P Fleming (United States) J McEnroe	4	6	6	6
10	(Australia) J Alexander (Australia) J Fitzgerald	6	1	4	3

==== Section 2 ====
First round
3	(United States) B Gottfried (Australia) P McNamee	6	6	5	6
(United States) M Estep (New Zealand) J Simpson	0	3	7	2
(Brazil) G Barbosa (Brazil) J Soares	3	2	4
(Sweden) S Simonsson (Sweden) M Wilander	6	6	6
(Australia) W Hampson (Australia) C Johnstone	7	6	6	6
(United States) B Testerman (United States) T Waltke	6	4	7	4
WC	(United Kingdom) J Bates (United Kingdom) J Dier	6	7	1	6	9
16	(Sweden) J Gunnarsson (United States) M Leach	7	6	6	3	7
14	(United States) C Hooper (United States) P Rennert	3	3	6
(Australia) R Case (Australia) B Drewett	6	6	7
(United States) M De Palmer (United States) M Purcell	7	6	5	6
(United States) J Benson (United States) C Edwards	5	1	7	4
WC	(India) V Amritraj (United States) R Tanner	6	6	6	6	11
(United States) C Strode (United States) M Strode	7	4	2	7	9
(India) A Amritraj (United States) R Meyer	1	4	4
6	(Sweden) A Järryd (Sweden) H Simonsson	6	6	6

Second round
3	(United States) B Gottfried (Australia) P McNamee	6	7	6
(Sweden) S Simonsson (Sweden) M Wilander	3	5	3
(Australia) W Hampson (Australia) C Johnstone	4	7	6	7
WC	(United Kingdom) J Bates (United Kingdom) J Dier	6	5	3	6
(Australia) R Case (Australia) B Drewett	3	6	6	6
(United States) M De Palmer (United States) M Purcell	6	4	4	2
WC	(India) V Amritraj (United States) R Tanner	4	6	1
6	(Sweden) A Järryd (Sweden) H Simonsson	6	7	6

Third round
3	(United States) B Gottfried (Australia) P McNamee	6	6	6
(Australia) W Hampson (Australia) C Johnstone	4	4	4
(Australia) R Case (Australia) B Drewett	6	4	6
6	(Sweden) A Järryd (Sweden) H Simonsson	7	6	7

Quarterfinals
3	(United States) B Gottfried (Australia) P McNamee	6	6	6	5	2
6	(Sweden) A Järryd (Sweden) H Simonsson	0	2	7	7	6

=== Bottom half ===
==== Section 3 ====
First round
7	(United States) Ti Gullikson (United States) To Gullikson	6	7	6
Q	(Sweden) S Edberg (United States) B Levine	4	5	2
(Brazil) J Góes (Brazil) N Keller	6	4	3	1
Q	(United Kingdom) C Dowdeswell (United Kingdom) R Drysdale	4	6	6	6
(United States) L Stefanki (United States) R Van't Hof	4	6	4	5
(New Zealand) C Lewis (New Zealand) R Simpson	6	4	6	7
(South Africa) S van der Merwe (South Africa) R Venter	4	4	5
11	(United States) A Mayer (United States) F Taygan	6	6	7
15	(United States) T Delatte (United States) J Kriek	4	3^{r}
LL	(United States) S Giammalva (Sweden) H Sundström	6	5
(Netherlands) H van Boeckel (Zimbabwe) H Ismail	6	5	1	3
WC	(United Kingdom) N Brown (United Kingdom) S Shaw	4	7	6	6
(South Africa) C Viljoen (South Africa) D Visser	6	7	6	7
(Chile) R Acuña (United States) S Krulevitz	3	5	7	6
WC	(United Kingdom) A Jarrett (United Kingdom) C Mottram	2	6	3	6	10
4	(Australia) M Edmondson (United States) S Stewart	6	2	6	3	8

Second round
7	(United States) Ti Gullikson (United States) To Gullikson	7	6	6
Q	(United Kingdom) C Dowdeswell (United Kingdom) R Drysdale	6	2	4
(New Zealand) C Lewis (New Zealand) R Simpson	3	2	6	6
11	(United States) A Mayer (United States) F Taygan	6	6	3	7
LL	(United States) S Giammalva (Sweden) H Sundström	6	3	6	6
WC	(United Kingdom) N Brown (United Kingdom) S Shaw	1	6	3	4
(South Africa) C Viljoen (South Africa) D Visser	4	5	4
WC	(United Kingdom) A Jarrett (United Kingdom) C Mottram	6	7	6

Third round
7	(United States) Ti Gullikson (United States) To Gullikson	7	6	7
11	(United States) S Mayer (United States) F Taygan	6	1	5
LL	(United States) S Giammalva (Sweden) H Sundström	6	1	6	6
WC	(United Kingdom) A Jarrett (United Kingdom) C Mottram	3	6	3	2

Quarterfinals
7	(United States) Ti Gullikson (United States) To Gullikson	7	6	6
LL	(United States) S Giammalva (Sweden) H Sundström	6	3	4

==== Section 4 ====
First round
Q	(United States) R Druz (United States) J Kruger	7	3	5	1
(United States) M Mitchell (United States) C Wittus	6	6	7	6
(United States) A Giammalva (United States) S Meister	7	4	4	7	1
(Australia) P Cash (Australia) C Miller	6	6	6	6	6
(Italy) C Panatta (Sweden) M Tideman	7	2	6	3
(Czechoslovakia) S Birner (Czechoslovakia) L Pimek	6	6	7	6
(United States) M Bauer (France) G Moretton	6	6	6
9	(United States) V Amaya (United States) H Pfister	3	4	4
13	(United States) A Andrews (United States) J Sadri	6	2	6	5
(Australia) S Ball (United States) J Canter	7	6	4	7
(Chile) J Fillol (South Africa) F McMillan	7	6	7	7
(South Africa) E Edwards (United Kingdom) J Smith	6	7	6	6
(Australia) D Graham (Australia) L Warder	7	4	1	6	3
(Australia) P Johnston (Australia) J McCurdy	6	6	6	4	6
(United States) D Dowlen (Nigeria) N Odizor	6	2	2
2	(South Africa) K Curren (United States) S Denton	7	6	6

Second round
(United States) M Mitchell (United States) C Wittus	3	4	4
(Australia) P Cash (Australia) C Miller	6	6	6
(Czechoslovakia) S Birner (Czechoslovakia) L Pimek	6	6	7	5
(United States) M Bauer (France) G Moretton	7	7	6	7
(Australia) S Ball (United States) J Canter	6	6	7	6	9
(Chile) J Fillol (South Africa) F McMillan	3	7	6	7	11
(Australia) P Johnston (Australia) J McCurdy	4	4	0
2	(South Africa) K Curren (United States) S Denton	6	6	6

Third round
(Australia) P Cash (Australia) C Miller	3	7	2	3
(United States) M Bauer (France) G Moretton	6	6	6	6
(Chile) J Fillol (South Africa) F McMillan	4	1	4
2	(South Africa) K Curren (United States) S Denton	6	6	6

Quarterfinals
(United States) M Bauer (France) G Moretton	4	7	7	6	7
2	(South Africa) K Curren (United States) S Denton	6	6	6	7	9
