= Helena Olsson =

Swedish tennis player

- Country (sports): Sweden
- Born: 4 January 1965 (age 61)
- Retired: 1984
- Prize money: $16,293

Singles
- Career record: 20-35
- Career titles: 0
- Highest ranking: 364 (15 March 1987)

Doubles
- Career record: 23-30
- Career titles: 0 WTA, 4 ITF
- Highest ranking: 239 (16 February 1987)

Helena Olsson (born 4 January 1965) is a former professional tennis player from Sweden who won the 1983 French Open girls' doubles championship with Carin Anderholm and played on the WTA tour.

== ITF finals ==
=== Singles (0–2) ===
| Result | No. | Date | Tournament | Surface | Opponent | Score |
|---|---|---|---|---|---|---|
| Loss | 1. | 4 November 1984 | Sydney, Australia | Grass | (Australia) Dianne Fromholtz | 1–6, 6–3, 1–6 |
| Loss | 2. | 27 April 1986 | Hatfield, United Kingdom | Clay | (France) Pascale Etchemendy | 3–6, 5–7 |

=== Doubles (4–2) ===
| Result | No. | Date | Tournament | Surface | Partner | Opponents | Score |
|---|---|---|---|---|---|---|---|
| Loss | 1. | 18 July 1982 | Bastad, Sweden | Clay | (West Germany) Myriam Schropp | (United States) Karin Huebner (Hungary) Éva Rózsavölgyi | 2–6, 5–7 |
| Win | 2. | 4 April 1983 | Caserta, Italy | Clay | (Denmark) Tine Scheuer-Larsen | (Italy) Anna Iuale (Czechoslovakia) Lea Plchová | 6–2, 6–3 |
| Win | 3. | 15 July 1984 | Båstad, Sweden | Clay | (Sweden) Carin Anderholm | (Spain) Elena Guerra (Romania) Daniela Moise | 1–6, 7–6, 6–0 |
| Win | 4. | 8 October 1984 | Wyong, Australia | Grass | (Sweden) Stina Almgren | (Australia) Colleen Carney (New Zealand) Belinda Cordwell | 7–5, 7–5 |
| Loss | 5. | 27 April 1986 | Hatfield, United Kingdom | Hard | (Sweden) Catrin Jexell | (South Africa) Monica Reinach (United Kingdom) Joy Tacon | 1–6, 7–5, 3–6 |
| Win | 6. | 19 January 1987 | Stockholm, Sweden | Carpet | (Sweden) Catrin Jexell | (Sweden) Maria Strandlund (Sweden) Jonna Jonerup | 6–2, 6–3 |
