= Karin Huebner (tennis) =

American historian and tennis player

- Country (sports): United States
- Born: March 23, 1964 (age 62)
- Prize money: $18,061

Singles

Grand Slam singles results
- French Open: Q1 (1984, 1985)
- Wimbledon: Q2 (1985)
- US Open: 1R (1984)

Doubles

Grand Slam doubles results
- Wimbledon: Q2 (1984)

Karin Huebner (born March 23, 1964) is an American historian and former professional tennis player.

A native of Fresno, California, Huebner was a collegiate tennis player for the UCLA Bruins in the early 1980s, before competing on the international tour. She qualified for her only grand slam singles main draw at the 1984 US Open and fell in the first round to Raffaella Reggi.

Huebner, who holds a PhD in history from the University of Southern California, works for her alma mater as the Director of Programs at the Harman Academy for Polymathic Study.
