= Heather Crowe (tennis) =

American tennis player

- Full name: Heather Crowe Conner
- Country (sports): United States
- Born: July 12, 1961 (age 64)
- College: Indiana
- Prize money: $66,322

Singles

Grand Slam singles results
- Wimbledon: 1R (1983)
- US Open: 3R (1982)

Doubles

Grand Slam doubles results
- Australian Open: 1R (1984, 1985)
- French Open: 2R (1986)
- Wimbledon: 2R (1987)
- US Open: 2R (1985)

Heather Crowe Conner (born July 12, 1961) is an American former professional tennis player.

== Biography ==
Crowe grew up in Massachusetts, attending Masconomet Regional High School, then played college tennis at Indiana University in the early 1980s. A two-time All-American for both singles and doubles, Crowe was the 1982 AIAW singles champion and also helped guide Indiana to the team title that year. While at Indiana, she won the Broderick Award (now the Honda Sports Award) as the nation's top collegiate tennis player in 1982.

At the 1982 US Open, Crowe reached the third round of the singles main draw, with wins over Stacy Margolin and Barbara Hallquist.

As a doubles player she featured in the main draw of all four grand slam tournaments during her professional career and was runner-up at the Virginia Slims of Utah in 1984, partnering Robin White. Her most regular doubles partner on tour was Kim Steinmetz.

She retired from professional tennis in 1988 and has since become Heather Conner through marriage.

In 2011 she spoke publicly of having been sexually abused from the age of 14 by tennis player Bob Hewitt, who was coaching her at the time. The allegations led to an investigation into Hewitt, with more victims coming forward, ultimately leading to his imprisonment in South Africa.

== WTA Tour finals ==
=== Doubles (0–1) ===
Result	Date	Tournament	Surface	Partner	Opponents	Score
Loss	Sep 1984	Salt Lake City, Utah, USA	Hard	(United States) Robin White	(Australia) Anne Minter (Australia) Elizabeth Minter	1–6, 2–6
