= Gustav Fichardt =

South African tennis player (born 1965)

- Country (sports): South Africa
- Residence: Bloemfontein, South Africa
- Born: 7 July 1965 (age 60) Pretoria, South Africa
- Height: 1.85 m (6 ft 1 in)
- Plays: Right-handed
- Prize money: $5,892

Singles
- Career record: 0–1
- Highest ranking: No. 470 (29 August 1988)

Grand Slam singles results
- Wimbledon: 1R (1988)

Doubles
- Highest ranking: No. 720 (7 August 1989)

Gustav Fichardt (born 7 July 1965) is a South African former tennis player.

Fichardt qualified for the 1988 Wimbledon Championships – Men's singles losing in the first round to Chris Pridham.

He is head of the Gustav Fichardt Tennis Academy in Bloemfontein, Free State where he has coached Philip Henning, amongst others.

In 2016 he was appointed to the board of Tennis South Africa.

== Personal life ==
Fichardt is married to Isabel Coetzer, the sister of former South African tennis player Amanda Coetzer.
