= Silvana Campos =

Brazilian tennis player (born 1966)

- Country (sports): Brazil
- Born: 11 May 1966 (age 60) Ribeirão Preto, Brazil
- Plays: Right-handed

Singles
- Career record: 4–10

Grand Slam singles results
- French Open: Q2 (1985)

Other tournaments
- Olympic Games: 1R (1984)

Doubles
- Career record: 7–8

Grand Slam doubles results
- French Open: 2R (1985)

Silvana Campos (born 11 May 1966) is a Brazilian former professional tennis player.

== Biography ==
=== Tennis career ===
Born in Ribeirão Preto, Campos competed on tour in the 1980s and represented Brazil in international events, including the Olympics and Pan American Games. She was fourth in the singles tournament at the 1983 Pan American Games and also featured at the 1984 Summer Olympics in Los Angeles, where tennis was a demonstration sport. At the Olympics she was beaten in the first round by France's Pascale Paradis.

Campos played Federation Cup tennis for Brazil in 1984 and won all four of her singles rubbers.

On the WTA Tour she had her best performance at the 1984 Brasil Open in Rio de Janeiro, winning her way through to the semi-finals.

Campos appeared in the main draw of the women's doubles at the 1985 French Open and reached the second round with partner Luciana Corsato.

=== Personal life ===
Campos was the second of four wives of Brazilian footballer Sócrates, whom she married in 1990. They had one son together, Sócrates Júnior.

She took part in the torch relay for the 2016 Olympics in Rio de Janeiro, carrying the torch through the streets of Ribeirão Preto.
