= Barbara Jordan (tennis) =

American tennis player

- Country (sports): United States
- Born: April 2, 1957 (age 68) Milwaukee, Wisconsin, U.S.
- Height: 5 ft 5 in (1.65 m)
- Plays: Right-handed
- Prize money: US$ 145,534

Singles
- Career record: 13–14
- Highest ranking: No. 55 (December 1979)

Grand Slam singles results
- Australian Open: W (1979)
- French Open: 2R (1981)
- Wimbledon: 3R (1978, 1980, 1983)
- US Open: 3R (1979)

Doubles
- Career record: 6–7
- Highest ranking: No. 42 (December 1984)

Grand Slam doubles results
- Australian Open: QF (1979)
- French Open: SF (1984)
- Wimbledon: 3R (1983)

Grand Slam mixed doubles results
- French Open: W (1983)

Barbara Jordan (born April 2, 1957) is an American former professional tennis player who won the 1979 Australian Open singles title.

Jordan also won the mixed doubles title at the 1983 French Open with Eliot Teltscher. Jordan was a three-time All-American at Stanford University, where she obtained her degree in economics in three years. She won the 1978 AIAW College National doubles with sister Kathy Jordan in 1978. Jordan made her first appearance on the (WTA) computer in August 1977 at No. 95. She was a five-time member of WTA board of directors as well as served as chairman of the tournament committee in 1980. Jordan also won the USTA under 21-National Championship in 1978 in singles and doubles. She went on to earn her Juris Doctor from UCLA.

== Grand Slam finals ==
=== Singles (1 title) ===
Result	Year	Championship	Surface	Opponent	Score
Win	1979	Australian Open	Grass	(United States) Sharon Walsh	6–3, 6–3

=== Mixed doubles (1 title) ===
Result	Year	Championship	Surface	Partner	Opponents	Score
Win	1983	French Open	Clay	(United States) Eliot Teltscher	(United States) Leslie Allen (United States) Charles Strode	6–2, 6–3

== Grand Slam tournament performance timeline ==
Key
W	F	SF	QF	#R	RR	Q#	DNQ	A	NH

(W) winner; (F) finalist; (SF) semifinalist; (QF) quarterfinalist; (#R) rounds 4, 3, 2, 1; (RR) round-robin stage; (Q#) qualification round; (DNQ) did not qualify; (A) absent; (NH) not held; (SR) strike rate (events won / competed); (W–L) win–loss record.

=== Singles ===
Tournament	1977		1978	1979	1980	1981	1982	1983	1984	1985	1986	SR
Australian Open	A	A	A	W	A	A	Q1	1R	A	A	A	1 / 2
French Open	A		A	1R	1R	2R	1R	1R	1R	A	A	0 / 6
Wimbledon	A		3R	2R	3R	A	2R	3R	A	1R	A	0 / 6
US Open	3R		1R	3R	2R	2R	1R	1R	Q3	1R	Q1	0 / 8
Strike rate	0 / 1		0 / 2	1 / 4	0 / 3	0 / 2	0 / 3	0 / 4	0 / 1	0 / 2	0 / 0	1 / 22

Note: The Australian Open was held twice in 1977, in January and December.

== Honors ==
Jordan has been inducted in the ITA Women's Hall of Fame, the USTA Hall of Fame, the Stanford Hall of Fame and others
