= Rene Mentz =

South African tennis player

- Country (sports): South Africa
- Born: 26 May 1966 (age 58)
- Prize money: $27,482

Singles
- Career record: 39–12
- Career titles: 3 ITF
- Highest ranking: No. 295 (8 November 1993)

Grand Slam singles results
- French Open: 1R (1984)
- Wimbledon: 2R (1983)

Doubles
- Career record: 23–8
- Career titles: 4 ITF
- Highest ranking: No. 285 (25 October 1993)

Grand Slam doubles results
- Wimbledon: 2R (1984)

Grand Slam mixed doubles results
- Wimbledon: 1R (1984)

Rene Mentz (born 26 May 1966) is a South African former professional tennis player.

Mentz, a junior Wimbledon quarterfinalist who was raised in Pretoria, played on the professional tour in the 1980s and early 1990s. She reached a career-high singles ranking of 295 in the world.

During her career she featured in the women's singles main draws of both the French Open and Wimbledon, making the second round of the latter in 1983.

Her best Virginia Slims/WTA Tour performance came at the 1984 Central Fidelity Banks International in Richmond, where she made it through to the quarterfinals, with wins over Leslie Allen and Anna-Maria Fernandez.

== ITF finals ==
Legend
$25,000 tournaments
$10,000 tournaments

=== Singles: 6 (3–3) ===
Result	No.	Date	Tournament	Surface	Opponent	Score
Win	1.	9 May 1983	ITF Warwickshire, United Kingdom	Clay	(United Kingdom) Shelley Walpole	6–0, 6–4
Loss	1.	9 October 1983	ITF Canberra, Australia	Grass	(United States) Kristin Kinney	3–6, 6–2, 2–6
Loss	2.	22 November 1986	ITF Johannesburg, South Africa	Hard	(South Africa) Dianne Van Rensburg	3–6, 1–6
Loss	3.	5 March 1989	ITF Pretoria, South Africa	Hard	(South Africa) Gail Boon	6–7^{(6)}, 7–6^{(4)}, 4–6
Win	2.	4 April 1993	ITF Gaborone, Botswana	Hard	(United States) Erica Adams	6–4, 3–6, 6–3
Win	3.	10 October 1993	ITF Pretoria, South Africa	Hard	(South Africa) Cindy Summers	6–4, 3–6, 6–2

=== Doubles: 6 (4–2) ===
Result	No.	Date	Tournament	Surface	Partner	Opponents	Score
Win	1.	29 January 1984	ITF Miami, United States	Hard	(United States) Heather Crowe	(Argentina) Mercedes Paz (United States) Ronni Reis	6–4, 6–3
Loss	1.	21 November 1987	ITF Johannesburg, South Africa	Hard	(South Africa) Mariaan de Swardt	(United States) Barbara Gerken (United States) Beth Herr	6–7, 2–6
Win	2.	5 March 1989	ITF Pretoria, South Africa	Hard	(South Africa) Monica Reinach	(South Africa) Michelle Anderson (South Africa) Linda Barnard	6–1, 2–6, 6–4
Win	3.	2 May 1993	ITF Acapulco, Mexico	Clay	(United States) Claire Sessions Bailey	(Hungary) Petra Gáspár (Czech Republic) Alena Havrlíková	6–1, 6–3
Loss	2.	12 July 1993	ITF Evansville, United States	Hard	(South Africa) Mareze Joubert	(Netherlands) Carin Bakkum (Japan) Hiromi Nagano	2–6, 2–6
Win	4.	10 October 1993	ITF Pretoria, South Africa	Hard	(South Africa) Liezel Horn	(South Africa) Surina De Beer (South Africa) Karen van der Merwe	7–6^{(4)}, 7–5
