= Myriam Schropp =

German tennis player

- Country (sports): West Germany
- Born: 29 April 1966 (age 60)
- Turned pro: 1982
- Retired: 1988
- Prize money: $85,840

Singles
- Career record: 28–49
- Career titles: 0
- Highest ranking: No. 42 (April 1985)

Grand Slam singles results
- Australian Open: 2R (1984, 1985)
- French Open: 2R (1984)
- Wimbledon: 1R (1983, 1985)
- US Open: 1R (1984, 1985)

Other tournaments
- Olympic Games: 2R (1984)

Doubles
- Career record: 13–30
- Career titles: 0
- Highest ranking: No. 55 (February 1987)

Grand Slam doubles results
- Australian Open: 2R (1987)
- French Open: 1R (1985, 1986)
- Wimbledon: 1R (1985)
- US Open: 2R (1985)

Myriam Schropp (born 29 April 1966) is a retired German tennis player. She played on the WTA tour from 1982 to 1988. She represented West Germany at the 1984 and 1985 Fed Cup. She also competed at several Grand Slam tournaments and reached the semifinals of the 1984 Japan Open.
