= Bernadette Randall =

Australian tennis player

- Country (sports): Australia
- Born: 27 September 1965 (age 60) Sydney, Australia
- Prize money: US$ 13,294

Singles

Grand Slam singles results
- Australian Open: 1R (1979, 1980, 1983)
- Wimbledon: 2R (1983)

Doubles

Grand Slam doubles results
- Australian Open: 2R (1983)
- Wimbledon: 1R (1983)

Mixed doubles

Grand Slam mixed doubles results
- Wimbledon: 2R (1983)

Bernadette Randall (born 27 September 1965) is a retired tennis player from Australia.

She won the US Girls Doubles with American Ann Hulbert in 1983

== Junior Grand Slam finals ==
=== Girls' doubles: 3 (2–1) ===
Result	Year	Championship	Surface	Partner	Opponents	Score
Loss	1982	US Open	Hard	(United States) Ann Hulbert	(United States) Penny Barg (United States) Beth Herr	6–1, 5–7, 6–7
Win	1983	Australian Open	Hard	(Australia) Kim Staunton	(Australia) Jenny Byrne (Australia) Janine Thompson	6–3, 6–3
Win	1983	US Open	Hard	(United States) Ann Hulbert	(Soviet Union) Natasha Reva (Soviet Union) Larisa Savchenko	6–4, 6–2

== Career finals ==
=== Singles (2–0) ===
Result	No.	Date	Tournament	Surface	Opponent	Score
Win	1.	30 May 1982	Glasgow, United Kingdom	Grass	(Australia) Elizabeth Minter	3–1 ret.
Win	2.	16 July 1983	Frinton-on-Sea, United Kingdom	Grass	(Australia) Vicki Marler	6–2, 6–3

=== Doubles (4–0) ===
Result	No.	Date	Tournament	Surface	Partner	Opponents	Score
Win	1.	29 May 1982	Glasgow, United Kingdom	Grass	(Australia) Elizabeth Minter	(South Africa) Kim Seddon (United States) Mary-Ann Colville	6–2, 7–5
Win	2.	28 March 1983	Taranto, Italy	Clay	(Australia) Elizabeth Minter	(Socialist Federal Republic of Yugoslavia) Sabrina Goleš (Socialist Federal Republic of Yugoslavia) Renata Šašak	7–5, 6–1
Win	3.	21 October 1983	Gold Coast, Australia	Hard	(Australia) Nerida Gregory	(Australia) Jenny Byrne (Australia) Amanda Tobin	7–6, 7–6
Win	4.	4 November 1988	Melbourne, Australia	Hard	(Australia) Natalia Leipus	(Australia) Kristin Godridge (Bulgaria) Elena Pampoulova	6–4, 6–7^{(5)}, 6–2
