= Carin Anderholm =

Swedish tennis player

- Country (sports): Sweden
- Born: 11 March 1966 (age 60) Båstad, Sweden
- Retired: 1986
- Plays: Right-handed
- Prize money: $18,097

Singles
- Career record: 8-20
- Career titles: 0
- Highest ranking: 555 (2 February 1987)

Grand Slam singles results
- Australian Open: Q1 (1984)
- French Open: Q2 (1984)
- Wimbledon: Q1 (1985)
- US Open: 2R (1984)

Other tournaments
- Olympic Games: 1R (1984)

Doubles
- Career record: 4-8
- Career titles: 0 WTA, 1 ITF

Grand Slam doubles results
- Wimbledon: 1R (1984)

Carin Anderholm (born 11 March 1966) is a former professional tennis player from Sweden who won the 1983 French Open girls' doubles championship with Helena Olsson.

== ITF finals ==
Legend
$10,000 tournaments

=== Singles (0–3) ===
Result	No.	Date	Tournament	Surface	Opponent	Score
Loss	1.	17 July 1983	Båstad, Sweden	Hard	(Romania) Virginia Ruzici	2–6, 3-6
Loss	2.	23 January 1984	Key Biscayne, United States	Hard	(France) Isabelle Demongeot	5–7, 3–6
Loss	3.	15 July 1984	Båstad, Sweden	Clay	(Australia) Annette Gulley	1–6, 4-6

=== Doubles (1–0) ===
Result	No.	Date	Tournament	Surface	Partner	Opponents	Score
Win	1.	15 July 1984	Båstad, Sweden	Clay	(Sweden) Helena Olsson	(Spain) Elena Guerra (Romania) Daniela Moise	1–6, 7–6, 6-0
