= Rina Einy =

British tennis player

Rina Lynette Einy
- Full name: Rina Lynette Einy
- Country (sports): United Kingdom
- Born: 29 March 1965 (age 61) Kolkota, India
- Height: 161 cm (5 ft 3 in)
- Plays: Right-handed
- Prize money: US$ 29,136

Singles
- Career record: 10–14
- Highest ranking: No. 456 (21 December 1986)

Grand Slam singles results
- Australian Open: Q1 (1984)
- French Open: 1R (1984, 1985)
- Wimbledon: 1R (1983, 1984, 1985)
- US Open: Q2 (1983, 1985)

Other tournaments
- Olympic Games: 1R (1984)

Doubles
- Career record: 9–11

Grand Slam doubles results
- French Open: 1R (1984)
- Wimbledon: 1R (1983, 1984, 1985)

Grand Slam mixed doubles results
- Wimbledon: 2R (1984)

Rina Lynette Einy (born 29 March 1965) is a British former professional tennis player and business executive. She's won 10 out of 14 of her matches. She retired when she was 19 to make up for her lack of education.

== Career ==
Rina started out by joining a tennis club when she was in school at India. She started to compete in local tournaments and eventually played junior national tournaments. She moved to the United Kingdom at 13 and represented the country at international junior tournaments. Among the tournaments she joined include the Wimbledon Championships, the French Open, the Aussie Open, the US Open and the Tournament of Champions.

In 1984, when she was 19, Rina participated in the 1984 Olympics representing Great Britain. She lost in the first round of the competition by Raffaella Reggi-Concato. In the same year, she retired from professional tennis to pursue her education at the London School of Economics. After completing her undergraduate degree in Monetary Economics, she studied a graduate programme by JP Morgan & Co in New York before trading bonds and derivatives for the company in London.

She founded Culthread, an ethical outerwear lifestyle brand in 2018. She is also a Managing Director for Textyle International.

== Education ==
- BSc (Econ) in Monetary Economics, London School of Economics.
- Executive MBA, Cambridge Judge Business School.
- Doctorate in Business Administration (DBA), Warwick Business School, May 2025.
