= Elizabeth Minter =

Australian tennis player

- Country (sports): Australia
- Residence: Victoria, Australia
- Born: 23 August 1965 (age 61) Victoria, Australia
- Turned pro: 1980
- Plays: Left-handed (one-handed backhand)
- Prize money: $US123,934

Singles
- Career record: 72–80
- Career titles: 1 WTA
- Highest ranking: No. 66 (26 October 1987)

Grand Slam singles results
- Australian Open: 4R (1984)
- French Open: 1R (1985, 1986, 1987, 1988)
- Wimbledon: 3R (1986, 1988)
- US Open: 3R (1986)

Other tournaments
- Olympic Games: 1R (1984)

Doubles
- Career record: 32–67
- Career titles: 1 ITF
- Highest ranking: No. 104 (28 September 1987)

Grand Slam doubles results
- Australian Open: QF (1984)
- French Open: 2R (1985)
- Wimbledon: 3R (1987)
- US Open: 2R (1984, 1985)

Mixed doubles
- Career record: 2–2
- Career titles: 0

Grand Slam mixed doubles results
- Wimbledon: 2R (1985)
- US Open: 2R (1983)

Elizabeth Minter (born 23 August 1965) is an Australian former professional tennis player. She was born on 23 August 1965 in Australia and played on the WTA tour from 1980 to 1990. She now helps train young children.

== Tennis career ==
In 1983 Minter won the 1983 US Open Junior Girls' Singles. She reached the quarterfinals of the Australian Women's Doubles with her sister Anne Minter in 1984 losing to Chris Evert and Wendy Turnbull; the third round of Wimbledon in 1986 and 1988; and the U.S. Open in 1986. She retired with a 72–80 singles record and a 32–67 doubles record. In 1984 Minter won the Salt Lake City ITF Doubles title, with her sister.

Minter made her Fed Cup debut for Australia in 1984, where she played two doubles matches with her sister, against Argentina in the first round and Belgium in the second round of the World Group. Minter didn't make any further appearances for Australia.

== WTA Tour finals ==
=== Singles 1 ===
Legend
Grand Slam	0
WTA Championships	0
Tier I	0
Tier II	0
Tier III	0
Tier IV & V	0

Result	No.	Date	Tournament	Surface	Opponent	Score
Loss	1.	Apr 1995	Zagreb, Croatia	Clay	(Belgium) Sabine Appelmans	4–6, 3–6

=== Doubles 3 (2–1) ===
Legend
Grand Slam	0
WTA Championships	0
Tier I	0
Tier II	0
Tier III	0
Tier IV & V	0

Titles by surface
Hard	2
Clay	0
Grass	0
Carpet	0

Result	No.	Date	Tournament	Surface	Partner	Opponents	Score
Win	1.	Sep 1984	Salt Lake City, US	Hard	(Australia) Anne Minter	(United States) Heather Crowe (United States) Robin White	6–1, 6–2
Win	2.	Sep 1984	Richmond, US	Hard	(United States) JoAnne Russell	(South Africa) Jennifer Mundel (United States) Felicia Raschiatore	6–4, 3–6, 7–6
Loss	3.	Feb 1987	Auckland, New Zealand	Hard	(United States) Gretchen Magers	(United States) Anna-Maria Fernandez (New Zealand) Julie Richardson	6–4, 4–6, 2–6

== ITF Circuit finals ==
=== Singles (3–2) ===
Result	No.	Date	Tournament	Surface	Opponent	Score
Win	1.	15 November 1981	Bulleen, Australia	Hard	(Australia) Gwen Warnock	6–3, 6–2
Loss	1.	30 May 1982	Glasgow, Scotland	Grass	(Australia) Bernadette Randall	1–3 ret.
Win	2.	13 November 1982	Bulleen, Australia	Hard	(Australia) Louise Field	6–2, 4–6, 7–5
Loss	2.	18 April 1983	Bari, Italy	Clay	(Socialist Federal Republic of Yugoslavia) Sabrina Goleš	6–1, 5–7, 3–6
Win	3.	14 April 1986	Canberra, Australia	Grass	(United States) Anna-Maria Fernandez	7–6, 6–2

=== Doubles (3–1) ===
Result	No.	Date	Tournament	Surface	Partner	Opponents	Score
Win	1.	29 May 1982	Glasgow, Scotland	Grass	(Australia) Bernadette Randall	(South Africa) Kim Seddon (United States) Mary-Ann Colville	6–2, 7–5
Win	2.	28 March 1983	Taranto, Italy	Clay	(Australia) Bernadette Randall	(Socialist Federal Republic of Yugoslavia) Sabrina Goleš (Socialist Federal Republic of Yugoslavia) Renata Šašak	7–5, 6–1
Win	3.	18 April 1983	Bari, Italy	Clay	(Australia) Anne Minter	(Socialist Federal Republic of Yugoslavia) Sabrina Goleš (Socialist Federal Republic of Yugoslavia) Renata Šašak	6–4, 6–2
Loss	1.	14 April 1986	Canberra, Australia	Gras	(Australia) Louise Field	(United States) Anna-Maria Fernandez (New Zealand) Julie Richardson	7–5, 3–6, 3–6
