= 1982 Australian Open – Men's singles qualifying =

Men's singles qualifying
- 1982 Australian Open

Events
Singles	men	women		boys	girls
Doubles	men	women	mixed	boys	girls
WC Singles	men	women	quad
WC Doubles	men	women	quad
Legends	men	women	mixed

Qualification
Singles	men	women
- Australian Open

This article displays the qualifying draw for men's singles at the 1982 Australian Open.

== Seeds ==
1. (United States) Juan Farrow (qualified)
2. (Australia) John McCurdy (qualified)
3. (Austria) Gerald Mild (qualified)
4. (Australia) David Graham (qualifying competition, Lucky loser)
5. (United Kingdom) Jeremy Bates (second round)
6. (United States) Eric Sherbeck (qualified)
7. (Brazil) Eduardo Oncins (second round)
8. (United States) Rodney Crowley (qualifying competition)
9. (Australia) Ken Barton (qualified)
10. (United States) Jonathan Canter (qualifying competition)
11. (Australia) Hans Hansson (qualified)
12. (Australia) Laurie Warder (qualified)
13. (Australia) Roger Grant (second round)
14. (Australia) Brett Edwards (second round)
15. (United States) John Austin (qualifying competition)
16. (New Zealand) David Lewis (second round)
17. (Australia) Ross Case (qualified)
18. (United States) Matt McDonald (qualifying competition)
19. (United States) Sean Brawley (second round)
20. (Australia) Wes Horskins (qualified)
21. (Australia) Carl Limberger (qualifying competition)
22. (United Kingdom) David Shaw (qualifying competition)
23. (United States) Brett Dickinson (qualifying competition)
24. (United States) Robert Crames (second round)

== Qualifiers ==
1. (United States) Juan Farrow
2. (Australia) John McCurdy
3. (Austria) Gerald Mild
4. (United States) Mark Freedman
5. (United States) Joe Meyers
6. (United States) Eric Sherbeck
7. (Australia) John Stoddart
8. (Australia) Wes Horskins
9. (Australia) Ken Barton
10. (Australia) Ross Case
11. (Australia) Hans Hansson
12. (Australia) Laurie Warder

== Lucky losers ==
1. (Australia) David Graham

== Qualifying draw ==
Key

- Q = Qualifier
- WC = Wild card
- LL = Lucky loser
- Alt = Alternate
- ITF = ITF entry
- PR = Protected ranking
- SR = Special ranking
- SE = Special exempt
- JE = Junior exempt
- JR = Junior Accelerator Programme entrant
- CO = College Accelerator Programme entrant
- NG = Next Gen Accelerator Program entrant
- w/o = Walkover
- r = Retired
- d = Defaulted

=== First qualifier ===
First round
(Australia) Graham Riddle	3	6	1
18	(United States) Matt McDonald	6	3	6

Second round
1	(United States) Juan Farrow	7	7
(Australia) Brenden Sharp	6	6
(United States) Bob Weise	6	4
18	(United States) Matt McDonald	7	6

Qualifying competition
1	(United States) Juan Farrow	6	7
18	(United States) Matt McDonald	2	5

=== Second qualifier ===
First round
2	(Australia) John McCurdy	6	6
(United States) Bill Maze	3	2

Second round
2	(Australia) John McCurdy	6	6
(Australia) Chris Tregonning	4	2
WC	(Czechoslovakia) Marián Vajda	6	6
24	(United States) Robert Crames	3	1

Qualifying competition
2	(Australia) John McCurdy	6	6
WC	(Czechoslovakia) Marián Vajda	2	3

=== Third qualifier ===
First round
3	(Austria) Gerald Mild	6	7
(Australia) Bill Gilmour	1	6

Second round
3	(Austria) Gerald Mild	6	6
(Australia) Peter Barton	3	0
(United Kingdom) Nick Brown	4	4
15	(United States) John Austin	6	6

Qualifying competition
3	(Austria) Gerald Mild	4	6	7
15	(United States) John Austin	6	3	6

=== Fourth qualifier ===
First round
(United States) Mark Freedman	6	3	6
(New Zealand) Mark Lewis	3	6	2

Second round
4	(Australia) David Graham	6	7
WC	(Australia) Anthony Burke	4	6
(United States) Mark Freedman	6	6
13	(Australia) Roger Grant	3	4

Qualifying competition
4	(Australia) David Graham	4	2
(United States) Mark Freedman	6	6

=== Fifth qualifier ===
First round
5	(United Kingdom) Jeremy Bates	6	6
(Australia) Wayne Pascoe	2	3

Second round
5	(United Kingdom) Jeremy Bates	6	4	3
(United States) Joe Meyers	4	6	6
(United Kingdom) Stuart Bale	6	5
21	(Australia) Carl Limberger	7	7

Qualifying competition
(United States) Joe Meyers	6	6
21	(Australia) Carl Limberger	2	0

=== Sixth qualifier ===
First round

Second round
6	(United States) Eric Sherbeck	7	6
(Australia) Mark Hartnett	5	4
(Australia) Peter Thrupp	4	2
23	(United States) Brett Dickinson	6	6

Qualifying competition
6	(United States) Eric Sherbeck	7	6
23	(United States) Brett Dickinson	6	2

=== Seventh qualifier ===
First round
7	(Brazil) Eduardo Oncins	6	6
WC	(Australia) Jason Noonan	2	2

Second round
7	(Brazil) Eduardo Oncins	6	2	6
(Australia) John Stoddart	3	6	7
(Australia) Craig Tregonning	6	1
14	(Australia) Brett Edwards	1	0^{r}

Qualifying competition
(Australia) John Stoddart	6	6
(Australia) Craig Tregonning	2	3

=== Eighth qualifier ===
First round

Second round
8	(United States) Rodney Crowley	6	6
(Australia) Dermot Golden	3	4
WC	(Australia) Mike Baroch	2	0
20	(Australia) Wes Horskins	6	6

Qualifying competition
8	(United States) Rodney Crowley	6	4
20	(Australia) Wes Horskins	7	6

=== Ninth qualifier ===
First round
(Australia) Alvin Gardiner	6	6
WC	(Australia) Kelvin MacLean	0	2

Second round
9	(Australia) Ken Barton	7	3	6
(Italy) Bruno Capineri	5	6	1
(Australia) Alvin Gardiner	6	6	6
16	(New Zealand) David Lewis	2	7	1

Qualifying competition
9	(Australia) Ken Barton	6	6
(Australia) Alvin Gardiner	3	3

=== Tenth qualifier ===
First round

Second round
10	(United States) Jonathan Canter	6	6
(Australia) Stephen Maloney	3	1
WC	(Australia) Brendan Burke	4	4
17	(Australia) Ross Case	6	6

Qualifying competition
10	(United States) Jonathan Canter	6	2	6
17	(Australia) Ross Case	2	6	7

=== Eleventh qualifier ===
First round

Second round
11	(Australia) Hans Hansson	6	6
WC	(Australia) Mark Bertalli	2	4
(Australia) Brett Greenwood	6	3	7
19	(United States) Sean Brawley	4	6	6

Qualifying competition
11	(Australia) Hans Hansson	6	6
(Australia) Brett Greenwood	3	1

=== Twelfth qualifier ===
First round

Second round
12	(Australia) Laurie Warder	6	6
(United States) Jim Kohlberg	4	1
(Australia) Scott Marshall	4	6	3
22	(United Kingdom) David Shaw	6	4	6

Qualifying competition
12	(Australia) Laurie Warder	6	6
22	(United Kingdom) David Shaw	1	3
