= 1983 Australian Open – Men's singles qualifying =

Men's singles qualifying
- 1983 Australian Open

Events
Singles	men	women		boys	girls
Doubles	men	women	mixed	boys	girls
WC Singles	men	women	quad
WC Doubles	men	women	quad
Legends	men	women	mixed

Qualification
Singles	men	women
- Australian Open

This article displays the qualifying draw for men's singles at the 1983 Australian Open.

== Seeds ==
1. (United States) David Pate (qualified)
2. (United States) John Austin (qualified)
3. (France) Jérôme Vanier (first round)
4. (Netherlands) Huub van Boeckel (qualifying competition, lucky loser)
5. (Australia) Peter Doohan (qualified)
6. (Australia) Peter Johnston (second round)
7. (United States) Matt Anger (qualified)
8. (United States) Charles Strode (qualified)
9. (United States) Robert Seguso (qualified)
10. (United Kingdom) Jonathan Smith (qualified)
11. (United Kingdom) Jeremy Bates (second round)
12. (Australia) Greg Whitecross (qualified)
13. (Australia) Ross Case (second round)
14. (Brazil) Eduardo Oncins (qualifying competition, lucky loser)
15. (Australia) Wayne Hampson (qualified)
16. (France) Tarik Benhabiles (qualifying competition, lucky loser)
17. (New Zealand) Bruce Derlin (qualifying competition, lucky loser)
18. (South Africa) Brian Levine (second round)
19. (Australia) Syd Ball (qualifying competition)
20. (United States) John Van Nostrand (second round)
21. (Australia) Russell Barlow (second round)
22. (United States) Eric Sherbeck (qualified)
23. (United Kingdom) Martin Guntrip (first round)
24. (Finland) Olli Rahnasto (second round)

== Qualifiers ==
1. (United States) David Pate
2. (United States) John Austin
3. (United States) Ken Flach
4. (United States) Eric Sherbeck
5. (Australia) Peter Doohan
6. (Australia) Warren Maher
7. (United States) Matt Anger
8. (United States) Charles Strode
9. (United States) Robert Seguso
10. (United Kingdom) Jonathan Smith
11. (Australia) Wayne Hampson
12. (Australia) Greg Whitecross

== Lucky losers ==
1. (New Zealand) Bruce Derlin
2. (Netherlands) Huub van Boeckel
3. (Brazil) Eduardo Oncins
4. (France) Tarik Benhabiles

== Qualifying draw ==
Key

- Q = Qualifier
- WC = Wild card
- LL = Lucky loser
- Alt = Alternate
- ITF = ITF entry
- PR = Protected ranking
- SR = Special ranking
- SE = Special exempt
- JE = Junior exempt
- JR = Junior Accelerator Programme entrant
- CO = College Accelerator Programme entrant
- NG = Next Gen Accelerator Program entrant
- w/o = Walkover
- r = Retired
- d = Defaulted

=== First qualifier ===
First round
1	(United States) David Pate	6	6
(Australia) Roger Grant	3	2
(Australia) Robert Kilborn	6	1	4
(Australia) Anthony Lane	3	6	6
(Australia) David Graham	1	1
16	(France) Tarik Benhabiles	6	6

Second round
1	(United States) David Pate	6	6
(Australia) John Stoddart	2	4
(Australia) Anthony Lane	6	6	0
16	(France) Tarik Benhabiles	4	7	6

Qualifying competition
1	(United States) David Pate	6	6
16	(France) Tarik Benhabiles	2	2

=== Second qualifier ===
First round
2	(United States) John Austin	6	7
(Australia) Paul Mick	4	5
(Australia) Brad Guan	6	6
(Australia) Mark Bertalli	1	2

Second round
2	(United States) John Austin	7	6
(Australia) Tony Withers	5	3
(Australia) Brad Guan	6	7
21	(Australia) Russell Barlow	1	6

Qualifying competition
2	(United States) John Austin	6	6
(Australia) Brad Guan	4	4

=== Third qualifier ===
First round
3	(France) Jérôme Vanier	6	3	4
(United States) Ken Flach	4	6	6
(Australia) Laurie Warder	6	6
(Australia) Craig Tregonning	3	2
WC	(Australia) Gavin Pfitzner	1	2
13	(Australia) Ross Case	6	6

Second round
(United States) Ken Flach	6	7
(New Zealand) Mark Lewis	2	6
(Australia) Laurie Warder	6	6
13	(Australia) Ross Case	3	4

Qualifying competition
(United States) Ken Flach	1	6	6
(Australia) Laurie Warder	6	3	0

=== Fourth qualifier ===
First round
(Australia) Jamie Harty	4	2
(Australia) Peter Carter	6	6
(Australia) Mark Hartnett	4	7	7
(New Zealand) David Lewis	6	5	9
(Australia) Christian Schatz	5	4
22	(United States) Eric Sherbeck	7	6

Second round
4	(Netherlands) Huub van Boeckel	7	6
(Australia) Peter Carter	5	3
(New Zealand) David Lewis	4	4
22	(United States) Eric Sherbeck	6	6

Qualifying competition
4	(Netherlands) Huub van Boeckel	3	6	4
22	(United States) Eric Sherbeck	6	3	6

=== Fifth qualifier ===
First round
5	(Australia) Peter Doohan	6	6
WC	(Australia) Brad Properjohn	1	3
(Australia) Peter Della Vedova	2	2
19	(Australia) Syd Ball	6	6

Second round
5	(Australia) Peter Doohan	6	6	6
(Australia) Mike Baroch	7	3	4
(United States) Jacques Manset	2	6
19	(Australia) Syd Ball	6	7

Qualifying competition
5	(Australia) Peter Doohan	6	6
19	(Australia) Syd Ball	3	3

=== Sixth qualifier ===
First round
6	(Australia) Peter Johnston	4	6	6
(Australia) Graham Riddle	6	2	4
(Australia) Carl Limberger	6	6
(Australia) Adrian Targett	3	4
(Australia) Richard O'Farrell	1	7	6
23	(United Kingdom) Martin Guntrip	6	5	1

Second round
6	(Australia) Peter Johnston	6	1	1
(Australia) Carl Limberger	3	6	6
(Australia) Warren Maher	6	6
(Australia) Richard O'Farrell	2	2

Qualifying competition
(Australia) Carl Limberger	2	3
(Australia) Warren Maher	6	6

=== Seventh qualifier ===
First round
WC	(Australia) Brenden Sharp	6	3	2
(Australia) Lawrence Hall	3	6	6
(Australia) Dermot Golden	6	4	3
14	(Brazil) Eduardo Oncins	3	6	6

Second round
7	(United States) Matt Anger	4	6	8
(Australia) Lawrence Hall	6	4	6
(Australia) Archie Adamopoulos	6	2	0
14	(Brazil) Eduardo Oncins	3	6	6

Qualifying competition
7	(United States) Matt Anger	6	6
14	(Brazil) Eduardo Oncins	3	2

=== Eighth qualifier ===
First round
8	(United States) Charles Strode	6	6
WC	(Australia) Todd Viney	2	4
WC	(Australia) Craig Uren	4	6
(Japan) Hitoshi Shirato	6	7

Second round
8	(United States) Charles Strode	6	6
(Australia) Anthony Burke	3	3
(Japan) Hitoshi Shirato	6	6
18	(South Africa) Brian Levine	4	4

Qualifying competition
8	(United States) Charles Strode	6	6
(Japan) Hitoshi Shirato	1	3

=== Ninth qualifier ===
First round
(Australia) Chris Tregonning	6	6
(Australia) Peter Thrupp	3	3
(United Kingdom) David Shaw	6	5	1
20	(United States) John Van Nostrand	4	7	6

Second round
9	(United States) Robert Seguso	7	7
(Australia) Chris Tregonning	6	5
(Australia) Darren Cahill	6	6
20	(United States) John Van Nostrand	2	4

Qualifying competition
9	(United States) Robert Seguso	6	6
(Australia) Darren Cahill	2	2

=== Tenth qualifier ===
First round
10	(United Kingdom) Jonathan Smith	6	6	6
(Australia) Brett Custer	7	1	4
(Australia) Richard Fricker	3	3
17	(New Zealand) Bruce Derlin	6	6

Second round
10	(United Kingdom) Jonathan Smith	7	7
(Australia) Cliff Letcher	5	6
(Australia) Wes Horskins	4	6	5
17	(New Zealand) Bruce Derlin	6	3	7

Qualifying competition
10	(United Kingdom) Jonathan Smith	6	4	6
17	(New Zealand) Bruce Derlin	2	6	1

=== Eleventh qualifier ===
First round
11	(United Kingdom) Jeremy Bates	6	6
(Australia) Mark Woodforde	3	4
(Australia) Michael Fancutt	7	2	3
15	(Australia) Wayne Hampson	6	6	6

Second round
11	(United Kingdom) Jeremy Bates	6	4	4
(Australia) Des Tyson	3	6	6
(Australia) Ken Barton	6	6
15	(Australia) Wayne Hampson	7	7

Qualifying competition
(Australia) Des Tyson	6	1
15	(Australia) Wayne Hampson	7	6

=== Twelfth qualifier ===
First round
12	(Australia) Greg Whitecross	7	2	6
WC	(Australia) Wayne Cowley	5	6	2
(Australia) Ron Woodbridge	2	4
(New Zealand) Kelly Evernden	6	6

Second round
12	(Australia) Greg Whitecross	7	6
(Australia) Stephen Thompson	6	0
(New Zealand) Kelly Evernden	6	6
24	(Finland) Olli Rahnasto	2	2

Qualifying competition
12	(Australia) Greg Whitecross	3	6	6
(New Zealand) Kelly Evernden	6	1	4
