= 1981 Australian Open – Men's singles qualifying =

Men's singles qualifying
- 1981 Australian Open

Events
Singles	men	women		boys	girls
Doubles	men	women	mixed	boys	girls
WC Singles	men	women	quad
WC Doubles	men	women	quad
Legends	men	women	mixed

Qualification
Singles	men	women
- Australian Open

This article displays the qualifying draw for men's singles at the 1981 Australian Open.

== Seeds ==
1. (Austria) Robert Reininger (first round)
2. (Australia) Wayne Hampson (first round)
3. (United States) Steve Meister (qualified)
4. (Australia) Dale Collings (qualified)
5. (New Zealand) Jeff Simpson (qualifying competition)
6. (United States) Chris Mayotte (second round)
7. (France) Henri Leconte (first round)
8. (United Kingdom) John Lloyd (first round)
9. (New Zealand) David Mustard (second round)
10. (United States) Mike Estep (first round)
11. (South Africa) David Schneider (second round)
12. (United States) Cary Stansbury (first round)
13. (Australia) Warren Maher (qualifying competition)
14. (United States) Matt Mitchell (qualified)
15. (Australia) Cliff Letcher (qualified)
16. (Australia) Wayne Pascoe (qualified)

== Qualifiers ==
1. (Sweden) Thomas Högstedt
2. (Australia) Cliff Letcher
3. (United States) Steve Meister
4. (Australia) Dale Collings
5. (Australia) Wayne Pascoe
6. (United States) Eric Sherbeck
7. (United States) Drew Gitlin
8. (United States) Matt Mitchell

== Qualifying draw ==
Key

- Q = Qualifier
- WC = Wild card
- LL = Lucky loser
- Alt = Alternate
- ITF = ITF entry
- PR = Protected ranking
- SR = Special ranking
- SE = Special exempt
- JE = Junior exempt
- JR = Junior Accelerator Programme entrant
- CO = College Accelerator Programme entrant
- NG = Next Gen Accelerator Program entrant
- w/o = Walkover
- r = Retired
- d = Defaulted

=== First qualifier ===
First round
1	(Austria) Robert Reininger	2	0
(France) Loïc Courteau	6	6
(Sweden) Thomas Högstedt	6	6
PR	(Australia) Stephen Maloney	1	1
WC	(Australia) Mark Hartnett	2	6	6
(Japan) Shinichi Sakamoto	6	4	3
(United States) Jai DiLouie	4	6	2
13	(Australia) Warren Maher	6	4	6

Second round
(France) Loïc Courteau	7	4	6
(Sweden) Thomas Högstedt	6	6	7
WC	(Australia) Mark Hartnett	7	4	2
13	(Australia) Warren Maher	6	6	6

Qualifying competition
(Sweden) Thomas Högstedt	1	6	7
13	(Australia) Warren Maher	6	4	6

=== Second qualifier ===
First round
2	(Australia) Wayne Hampson	6	2	3
(Australia) John James	2	6	6
(Australia) Bill Gilmour	5	2
(Israel) Shahar Perkiss	7	6
WC	(Australia) John Frawley	6	6
(New Zealand) Claude England	3	2
(United Kingdom) Andrew Jarrett	4	4
15	(Australia) Cliff Letcher	6	6

Second round
(Australia) John James	7	6
(Israel) Shahar Perkiss	5	1
WC	(Australia) John Frawley	5	1
15	(Australia) Cliff Letcher	7	6

Qualifying competition
(Australia) John James	5	4
15	(Australia) Cliff Letcher	7	6

=== Third qualifier ===
First round
3	(United States) Steve Meister	6	6	6
WC	(Australia) Ken Barton	3	7	3
(United States) Andy Andrews	7	6	6
(United States) Mark Darby	6	7	3
(United States) Glenn Petrovic	7	6
(Australia) Glenn Busby	5	2
(Australia) Broderick Dyke	6	6	5
9	(New Zealand) David Mustard	7	4	7

Second round
3	(United States) Steve Meister	4	6	7
(United States) Andy Andrews	6	3	6
(United States) Glenn Petrovic	3	6	6
9	(New Zealand) David Mustard	6	2	3

Qualifying competition
3	(United States) Steve Meister	6	6
(United States) Glenn Petrovic	4	2

=== Fourth qualifier ===
First round
4	(Australia) Dale Collings	4	6	6
(United States) Joel Bailey	6	3	4
(Australia) Peter Smylie	4	6
(Japan) Hitoshi Shirato	6	7
WC	(Australia) Richard O'Farrell	2	6	5
(Japan) Shigeyuki Nishio	6	4	7
(United States) Matt McDonald	6	7	7
12	(United States) Cary Stansbury	7	6	6

Second round
4	(Australia) Dale Collings	6	6
(Japan) Hitoshi Shirato	1	2
(Japan) Shigeyuki Nishio	4	6	6
(United States) Matt McDonald	6	4	2

Qualifying competition
4	(Australia) Dale Collings	5	6	6
(Japan) Shigeyuki Nishio	7	1	2

=== Fifth qualifier ===
First round
5	(New Zealand) Jeff Simpson	6	6
(Australia) Tony Withers	2	4
(Australia) Deiter Johle	3	6	3
(Australia) Alvin Gardiner	6	1	6
(Australia) Michael Fancutt	6	6
(Australia) Russell Barlow	4	3
PR	(United States) Maurice Hunter	6	1
16	(Australia) Wayne Pascoe	7	6

Second round
5	(New Zealand) Jeff Simpson	6	6
(Australia) Alvin Gardiner	4	3
(Australia) Michael Fancutt	2	6	1
16	(Australia) Wayne Pascoe	6	2	6

Qualifying competition
5	(New Zealand) Jeff Simpson	6	7	2
16	(Australia) Wayne Pascoe	7	6	6

=== Sixth qualifier ===
First round
6	(United States) Chris Mayotte	6	6	6
(Philippines) Beeyong Sison	4	7	4
(United States) Rick Meyers	6	6	5
(United States) Eric Sherbeck	4	7	7
(Australia) Peter Johnston	6	6
(Australia) Wes Horskins	4	1
(West Germany) Dirk Vestweber	5	7	5
11	(South Africa) David Schneider	7	5	7

Second round
6	(United States) Chris Mayotte	6	3
(United States) Eric Sherbeck	7	6
(Australia) Peter Johnston	6	6	6
11	(South Africa) David Schneider	3	7	2

Qualifying competition
(United States) Eric Sherbeck	5	6	6
(Australia) Peter Johnston	7	4	4

=== Seventh qualifier ===
First round
7	(France) Henri Leconte	7	6	6
(United States) Mike Brunnberg	5	7	7
(Australia) John McCurdy	1	5
(Australia) Peter Doohan	6	7
(United States) Mark Freedman	3	4
(United States) Craig Edwards	6	6
(United States) Drew Gitlin	7	3	6
10	(United States) Mike Estep	6	6	3

Second round
(United States) Mike Brunnberg	5	6
(Australia) Peter Doohan	7	7
(United States) Craig Edwards	6	6
(United States) Drew Gitlin	7	7

Qualifying competition
(Australia) Peter Doohan	3	2
(United States) Drew Gitlin	6	6

=== Eighth qualifier ===
First round
8	(United Kingdom) John Lloyd	1	3
(West Germany) Karl Schultz	6	6
(Switzerland) Markus Günthardt	7	6
(United States) Kevin Cook	5	0
WC	(Australia) Steve Wood	6	7
(Sweden) Jörgen Windahl	3	6
(United States) Rand Evett	4	6
14	(United States) Matt Mitchell	6	7

Second round
(West Germany) Karl Schultz	1	4
(Switzerland) Markus Günthardt	6	6
WC	(Australia) Steve Wood	4	4
14	(United States) Matt Mitchell	6	6

Qualifying competition
(Switzerland) Markus Günthardt	5	4
14	(United States) Matt Mitchell	7	6
