= 1983 Wimbledon Championships – Men's singles qualifying =

Men's singles qualifying
- 1983 Wimbledon Championships

Events
Singles	men	women		boys	girls
Doubles	men	women	mixed	boys	girls
WC Singles	men	women	quad
WC Doubles	men	women	quad
Legends	men	women	seniors

Qualification
Singles	men	women
Doubles	men	women	mixed
- Wimbledon Championships

Players who neither had high enough rankings nor received wild cards to enter the main draw of the annual Wimbledon Tennis Championships participated in a qualifying tournament held one week before the event. Several players withdrew from the main draw after qualifying had commenced, leading to the highest ranked players who lost in the final qualifying round to be entered into the main draw as lucky losers.

== Seeds ==
1. (Australia) Rod Frawley (qualified)
2. (United States) Mike Leach (qualified)
3. (United States) John Sadri (qualified)
4. (South Africa) Bernard Mitton (qualified)
5. (India) Sashi Menon (qualifying competition, lucky loser)
6. (United States) Scott Davis (qualified)
7. (United States) Mike Brunnberg (qualifying competition, lucky loser)
8. (United States) Tim Gullikson (qualified)
9. (Australia) John McCurdy (qualifying competition)
10. (United States) Jim Gurfein (first round)
11. (United States) Bruce Kleege (qualifying competition, lucky loser)
12. (South Africa) Danie Visser (qualified)
13. (Australia) Broderick Dyke (qualified)
14. (Australia) John Frawley (first round)
15. (United States) Andy Andrews (qualified)
16. (South Africa) Mike Myburg (first round)
17. (New Zealand) Jeff Simpson (first round)
18. (United States) Bruce Manson (qualifying competition)
19. (South Africa) Schalk van der Merwe (second round)
20. -
21. (United States) Butch Walts (qualifying competition)
22. (United States) Larry Stefanki (qualifying competition)
23. (Australia) Wayne Hampson (qualified)
24. (United States) Jonathan Canter (first round)
25. (United States) Peter Rennert (first round)
26. (Australia) Charlie Fancutt (qualified)
27. (United States) Richard Meyer (qualifying competition)
28. (United States) Jeff Turpin (qualified)
29. (United Kingdom) Colin Dowdeswell (second round)
30. (South Africa) David Schneider (second round)
31. (Australia) Peter Johnston (qualifying competition)
32. (United States) Leif Shiras (qualifying competition)

== Qualifiers ==
1. (Australia) Rod Frawley
2. (United States) Mike Leach
3. (United States) John Sadri
4. (South Africa) Bernard Mitton
5. (United States) Peter Fleming
6. (United States) Scott Davis
7. (United States) Jeff Turpin
8. (United States) Tim Gullikson
9. (Australia) Charlie Fancutt
10. (Switzerland) Jakob Hlasek
11. (South Africa) Tian Viljoen
12. (South Africa) Danie Visser
13. (Australia) Broderick Dyke
14. (Australia) Wayne Hampson
15. (United States) Andy Andrews
16. (United States) Eric Korita

== Lucky losers ==
1. (India) Sashi Menon
2. (Australia) John McCurdy
3. (United States) Mike Brunnberg
4. (United States) Bruce Kleege

== Qualifying draw ==
Key

- Q = Qualifier
- WC = Wild card
- LL = Lucky loser
- Alt = Alternate
- ITF = ITF entry
- PR = Protected ranking
- SR = Special ranking
- SE = Special exempt
- JE = Junior exempt
- JR = Junior Accelerator Programme entrant
- CO = College Accelerator Programme entrant
- NG = Next Gen Accelerator Program entrant
- w/o = Walkover
- r = Retired
- d = Defaulted

=== First qualifier ===
First round
1	(Australia) Rod Frawley	6	6
(India) Ranjit Mani	1	0
(United Kingdom) Willie Davies	6	7
(United Kingdom) Chris Emery	2	6
(United Kingdom) Jeremy Dier	6	6
(United Kingdom) Neil Rayner	1	1
(United States) Cary Stansbury	3	7	8
24	(United States) Jonathan Canter	6	6	6

Second round
1	(Australia) Rod Frawley	6	6
(United Kingdom) Willie Davies	2	2
(United Kingdom) Jeremy Dier	7	6
(United States) Cary Stansbury	5	3

Qualifying competition
1	(Australia) Rod Frawley	6	6	6	6
(United Kingdom) Jeremy Dier	7	4	4	4

=== Second qualifier ===
First round
2	(United States) Mike Leach	7	6
(United Kingdom) Chris Clarke	5	4
(United States) Randy Druz	6	6
(West Germany) Franz-Josef Wich	3	2
(United States) Tim Anderson	7	6	3
(Australia) Ken Barton	5	7	6
(Finland) Joakim Berner	3	7	1
31	(Australia) Peter Johnston	6	6	6

Second round
2	(United States) Mike Leach	6	6
(United States) Randy Druz	3	4
(Australia) Ken Barton	6	2	1
31	(Australia) Peter Johnston	4	6	6

Qualifying competition
2	(United States) Mike Leach	7	6	6
31	(Australia) Peter Johnston	6	4	4

=== Third qualifier ===
First round
3	(United States) John Sadri	7	6
(Colombia) Alejandro Cortes	6	1
(United Kingdom) Aubrey Barrett	0	1
(United States) Jack Kruger	6	6
(Australia) Peter Doohan	6	6
(United Kingdom) Paul Reekie	3	1
(United States) Armand Molino	6	2
19	(South Africa) Schalk van der Merwe	7	6

Second round
3	(United States) John Sadri	7	6
(United States) Jack Kruger	6	4
(Australia) Peter Doohan	7	6
19	(South Africa) Schalk van der Merwe	6	4

Qualifying competition
3	(United States) John Sadri	5	3	6	7	6
(Australia) Peter Doohan	7	6	4	6	4

=== Fourth qualifier ===
First round
4	(South Africa) Bernard Mitton	6	7
(United States) Derrick Rostagno	1	6
(South Africa) Brent Pirow	7	7
(Romania) Andrei Dîrzu	6	6
(South Africa) Arnold Pienaar	6	1
(United Kingdom) David Felgate	7	6
(Australia) Wes Horskins	2	4
29	(United Kingdom) Colin Dowdeswell	6	6

Second round
4	(South Africa) Bernard Mitton	7	6
(South Africa) Brent Pirow	6	2
(United Kingdom) David Felgate	6	2	6
29	(United Kingdom) Colin Dowdeswell	3	6	3

Qualifying competition
4	(South Africa) Bernard Mitton	6	6	6
(United Kingdom) David Felgate	2	3	2

=== Fifth qualifier ===
First round
5	(India) Sashi Menon	6	6
(West Germany) Gunther Gnettner	3	2
(United Kingdom) Steven Matthews	4	3
(West Germany) Christian Jessell	6	6
(United States) Peter Fleming	6	6
(United Kingdom) Stephen Charlery	1	0
(Denmark) Michael Mortensen	2	6	6
17	(New Zealand) Jeff Simpson	6	3	2

Second round
5	(India) Sashi Menon	6	6
(West Germany) Christian Jessell	3	4
(United States) Peter Fleming	6	6
(Denmark) Michael Mortensen	3	2

Qualifying competition
5	(India) Sashi Menon	4	7	6	6	1
(United States) Peter Fleming	6	6	7	3	6

=== Sixth qualifier ===
First round
6	(United States) Scott Davis	6	6
(United Kingdom) Anthony Porphiriou	0	0
(United States) Phil Lehnhoff	6	6
(United States) Charles Strode	4	4
(United Kingdom) Timothy Robson	3	0
(United States) Garth Haynes	6	6
(Belgium) Alain Brichant	3	6
18	(United States) Bruce Manson	6	7

Second round
6	(United States) Scott Davis	6	6
(United States) Phil Lehnhoff	4	3
(United States) Garth Haynes	6	5
18	(United States) Bruce Manson	7	7

Qualifying competition
6	(United States) Scott Davis	6	6	6
18	(United States) Bruce Manson	3	3	2

=== Seventh qualifier ===
First round
7	(United States) Mike Brunnberg	6	6
(Brazil) César Kist	3	3
(United Kingdom) Richard Stoakes	7	6	4
(United Kingdom) Martin Guntrip	6	7	6
(India) Srinivasan Vasudevan	6	6	2
(Australia) Hans Hansson	7	3	6
(Australia) Ross Case	4	3
28	(United States) Jeff Turpin	6	6

Second round
7	(United States) Mike Brunnberg	6	6
(United Kingdom) Martin Guntrip	1	2
(Australia) Hans Hansson	3	2
28	(United States) Jeff Turpin	6	6

Qualifying competition
7	(United States) Mike Brunnberg	6	7	3	6
28	(United States) Jeff Turpin	7	5	6	7

=== Eighth qualifier ===
First round
8	(United States) Tim Gullikson	6	6
(United States) Todd Nelson	2	2
(Mexico) Guillermo Stevens	4	4
(South Africa) Stephanus Reinach	6	6
(United States) David Dowlen	6	7
(United Kingdom) John Feaver	2	6
(Australia) Mark Kratzmann	3	6
27	(United States) Richard Meyer	6	7

Second round
8	(United States) Tim Gullikson	6	6
(South Africa) Stephanus Reinach	1	0
(United States) David Dowlen	3	2
27	(United States) Richard Meyer	6	6

Qualifying competition
8	(United States) Tim Gullikson	6	7	6	6
27	(United States) Richard Meyer	4	5	7	3

=== Ninth qualifier ===
First round
9	(Australia) John McCurdy	6	6
(United States) Mark Groetsch	3	0
(India) Anand Amritraj	6	6
(Brazil) Edvaldo Oliveira	3	2
(United States) John Benson	3	6	3
(West Germany) Harald Theissen	6	3	6
(New Zealand) David Mustard	4	7	6
26	(Australia) Charlie Fancutt	6	6	8

Second round
9	(Australia) John McCurdy	6	6
(India) Anand Amritraj	2	2
(West Germany) Harald Theissen	3	6	8
26	(Australia) Charlie Fancutt	6	3	10

Qualifying competition
9	(Australia) John McCurdy	3	5	6	7	9
26	(Australia) Charlie Fancutt	6	7	3	6	11

=== Tenth qualifier ===
First round
10	(United States) Jim Gurfein	6	2	2
(South Africa) Barry Moir	0	6	6
(Australia) Christian Schatz	6	6
(United States) Cary Leeds	2	1
(Switzerland) Jakob Hlasek	7	6
(United States) Jacques Manset	5	4
(Australia) David Graham	7	7
25	(United States) Peter Rennert	5	6

Second round
(South Africa) Barry Moir	6	6
(Australia) Christian Schatz	2	2
(Switzerland) Jakob Hlasek	6	6
(Australia) David Graham	4	4

Qualifying competition
(South Africa) Barry Moir	2	2	3
(Switzerland) Jakob Hlasek	6	6	6

=== Eleventh qualifier ===
First round
11	(United States) Bruce Kleege	6	6
(United States) Charles Cox	4	2
(United States) John Paley	5	4
(Belgium) Jan Vanlangendonck	7	6
(South Africa) Tian Viljoen	6	6
(South Africa) Gustav Fichardt	3	4
(Uganda) Patrick Tibbs
Alt	(United States) Bruce Crystal	w/o

Second round
11	(United States) Bruce Kleege	6	3	6
(Belgium) Jan Vanlangendonck	4	6	3
(South Africa) Tian Viljoen	6	6
(Uganda) Patrick Tibbs	4	2

Qualifying competition
11	(United States) Bruce Kleege	7	6	6	6	11
(South Africa) Tian Viljoen	6	7	7	3	13

=== Twelfth qualifier ===
First round
12	(South Africa) Danie Visser	6	6
(United States) Craig Edwards	3	3
(South Africa) Christo van Rensburg	6	7
(Australia) Greg Whitecross	3	6
(Australia) Michael Fancutt	6	7	6
(United States) Tracy Delatte	7	6	3
(South Africa) Christo Steyn	5	4
30	(South Africa) David Schneider	7	6

Second round
12	(South Africa) Danie Visser	4	6	7
(South Africa) Christo van Rensburg	6	3	5
(Australia) Michael Fancutt	7	3	6
30	(South Africa) David Schneider	6	6	3

Qualifying competition
12	(South Africa) Danie Visser	6	6	6
(Australia) Michael Fancutt	4	4	0

=== Thirteenth qualifier ===
First round
13	(Australia) Broderick Dyke	6	6
(Brazil) Fernando Roese	2	0
(United Kingdom) Mark Blincow	6	6
(United States) William Siegel	3	0
(Brazil) Carlos Chabalgoity	1	6
(United Kingdom) Nick Brown	6	7
(United Kingdom) Robin Drysdale	2	4
22	(United States) Larry Stefanki	6	6

Second round
13	(Australia) Broderick Dyke	7	6
(United Kingdom) Mark Blincow	6	3
(United Kingdom) Nick Brown	1	2
22	(United States) Larry Stefanki	6	6

Qualifying competition
13	(Australia) Broderick Dyke	6	6	6
22	(United States) Larry Stefanki	3	3	3

=== Fourteenth qualifier ===
First round
14	(Australia) John Frawley	0	1
(United Kingdom) Stephen Shaw	6	6
(United Kingdom) John Whiteford	3	6	6
Alt	(South Africa) Marius Masencamp	6	1	4
(United Kingdom) Bruce Young	7	6
(United Kingdom) Alan Douglas	6	4
(United Kingdom) Ian Currie	7	2	4
23	(Australia) Wayne Hampson	5	6	6

Second round
(United Kingdom) Stephen Shaw	6	2	2
(United Kingdom) John Whiteford	2	6	6
(United Kingdom) Bruce Young	4	1
23	(Australia) Wayne Hampson	6	6

Qualifying competition
(United Kingdom) John Whiteford	4	3	4
23	(Australia) Wayne Hampson	6	6	6

=== Fifteenth qualifier ===
First round
15	(United States) Andy Andrews	6	7
(United States) Tres Cushing	2	6
(Australia) Simon Youl	2	7	6
(Peru) Alberto Franco	6	6	2
(South Africa) Brian Levine	3	4
(United Kingdom) Michael Wayman	6	6
(West Germany) Ludwig-Lajos Levai	2	4
21	(United States) Butch Walts	6	6

Second round
15	(United States) Andy Andrews	6	6
(Australia) Simon Youl	4	4
(United Kingdom) Michael Wayman	5	6	4
21	(United States) Butch Walts	7	2	6

Qualifying competition
15	(United States) Andy Andrews	7	6	5	6
21	(United States) Butch Walts	6	3	7	4

=== Sixteenth qualifier ===
First round
16	(South Africa) Mike Myburg	6	6	2
(Australia) Laurie Warder	1	7	6
(United States) Eric Korita
Alt	(United Kingdom) Paul Butcher	w/o
(Australia) Russell Barlow	7	4	6
(United States) Bob Green	5	6	4
(United Kingdom) Jonathan Southcombe	1	4
32	(United States) Leif Shiras	6	6

Second round
(Australia) Laurie Warder	3	5
(United States) Eric Korita	6	7
(Australia) Russell Barlow	6	3	4
32	(United States) Leif Shiras	4	6	6

Qualifying competition
(United States) Eric Korita	6	6	6
32	(United States) Leif Shiras	4	2	3
