= 1982 Australian Open – Men's doubles =

Men's doubles
- 1982 Australian Open

Final
- Champion: (Australia) John Alexander (Australia) John Fitzgerald
- Runner-up: (United States) Andy Andrews (United States) John Sadri
- Score: 6–4, 7–6

Details
- Draw: 48
- Seeds: 16

Events
Singles	men	women		boys	girls
Doubles	men	women	mixed	boys	girls
WC Singles	men	women	quad
WC Doubles	men	women	quad
Legends	men	women	mixed
- Australian Open

The men's doubles tournament at the 1982 Australian Open was held from 29 November through 13 December 1982 on the outdoor grass courts at the Kooyong Stadium in Melbourne, Australia. John Alexander and John Fitzgerald won the title, defeating Andy Andrews and John Sadri in the final.

== Seeds ==
1. (United States) Steve Denton / (Australia) Mark Edmondson (third round)
2. (United States) Peter Rennert / (United States) Ferdi Taygan (semifinals)
3. (United States) Fritz Buehning / (United States) Johan Kriek (quarterfinals)
4. (United States) Tim Gullikson / (South Africa) Bernard Mitton (semifinals)
5. (United States) Andy Andrews / (United States) John Sadri (final)
6. (Australia) Syd Ball / (Australia) Phil Dent (third round)
7. (Australia) Rod Frawley / (New Zealand) Chris Lewis (third round)
8. (United States) Charles Strode / (United States) Morris Strode (quarterfinals)
9. (Brazil) Carlos Kirmayr / (France) Henri Leconte (second round)
10. (Australia) John Alexander / (Australia) John Fitzgerald (champions)
11. (United States) Bill Maze / (United States) Hank Pfister (quarterfinals)
12. (United States) Matt Mitchell / (United States) Larry Stefanki (second round)
13. (United States) Tim Mayotte / (United States) Tim Wilkison (second round)
14. (Paraguay) Francisco González / (Paraguay) Víctor Pecci (first round)
15. (United Kingdom) John Lloyd / (United States) Richard Meyer (second round)
16. (United States) Mike Gandolfo / (Australia) Craig A. Miller (third round)
17. (Australia) David Graham / (Australia) Laurie Warder (second round)

== Draw ==
Key

- Q = Qualifier
- WC = Wild card
- LL = Lucky loser
- Alt = Alternate
- ITF = ITF entry
- PR = Protected ranking
- SR = Special ranking
- SE = Special exempt
- JE = Junior exempt
- JR = Junior Accelerator Programme entrant
- CO = College Accelerator Programme entrant
- NG = Next Gen Accelerator Program entrant
- w/o = Walkover
- r = Retired
- d = Defaulted

=== Finals ===
Quarterfinals
10	(United States) Bill Maze (United States) Hank Pfister	4	6
5	(United States) Andy Andrews (United States) John Sadri	6	7
4	(United States) Tim Gullikson (South Africa) Bernard Mitton	6	6	7
8	(United States) Charles Strode (United States) Morris Strode	7	4	6
9	(Australia) John Alexander (Australia) John Fitzgerald	7	3	6
3	(United States) Fritz Buehning (United States) Johan Kriek	6	6	3
(United States) Mike Estep (United States) Tony Giammalva	4	3
2	(United States) Peter Rennert (United States) Ferdi Taygan	6	6

Semifinals
5	(United States) Andy Andrews (United States) John Sadri	6	7
4	(United States) Tim Gullikson (South Africa) Bernard Mitton	2	6
9	(Australia) John Alexander (Australia) John Fitzgerald	6	3	6
2	(United States) Peter Rennert (United States) Ferdi Taygan	3	6	3

Final
5	(United States) Andy Andrews (United States) John Sadri	4	6
9	(Australia) John Alexander (Australia) John Fitzgerald	6	7

=== Top half ===
==== Section 1 ====
First round
(Austria) P Feigl (Austria) B Pils	3	3
(Australia) D Collings (Australia) C Letcher	6	6
(New Zealand) B Derlin (New Zealand) D Mustard	6	6
(United States) M De Palmer (United States) A Kohlberg	3	4
(United States) L Bourne (Australia) C Johnstone	3	6	5
(Australia) B Guan (Australia) W Maher	6	4	7
WC	(Australia) A Burke (Australia) M Hartnett	2	4
5	(United States) A Andrews (United States) J Sadri	6	6

Second round
1	(United States) S Denton (Australia) M Edmondson	7	6
(Australia) D Collings (Australia) C Letcher	6	4	3
(New Zealand) B Derlin (New Zealand) D Mustard	4	5
10	(United States) B Maze (United States) H Pfister	6	7
11	(United States) M Mitchell (United States) L Stefanki	3	6
(Australia) B Guan (Australia) W Maher	6	7
(United States) M Bauer (United States) M Leach	4	4
5	(United States) A Andrews (United States) J Sadri	6	6

Third round
1	(United States) S Denton (Australia) M Edmondson	1	6	4
10	(United States) B Maze (United States) H Pfister	6	3	6
(Australia) B Guan (Australia) W Maher	4	5
5	(United States) A Andrews (United States) J Sadri	6	7

Quarterfinals
10	(United States) B Maze (United States) H Pfister	4	6
5	(United States) A Andrews (United States) J Sadri	6	7

==== Section 2 ====
First round
4	(United States) T Gullikson (South Africa) B Mitton	7	6
(United States) J Austin (United States) B Kleege	5	2
(Australia) R Case (Australia) B Drewett	6	6
13	(Paraguay) F González (Paraguay) V Pecci	4	4
(West Germany) D Keretić (West Germany) H Theissen	3	7	3
(Australia) P Johnston (Australia) J McCurdy	6	6	6
(Australia) P Cash (Australia) C Fancutt	6	3
8	(United States) C Strode (United States) M Strode	7	6

Second round
4	(United States) T Gullikson (South Africa) B Mitton	6	6
(Australia) H Hansson (Brazil) E Oncins	2	4
(United States) D Pate (United States) B Testerman	6	3
(Australia) R Case (Australia) B Drewett	7	6
16	(Australia) D Graham (Australia) L Warder	6	3
(Australia) P Johnston (Australia) J McCurdy	7	6
WC	(Australia) W Horskins (Australia) B Sharp	7	6	0
8	(United States) C Strode (United States) M Strode	5	7	6

Third round
4	(United States) T Gullikson (South Africa) B Mitton	3	7	7
(Australia) R Case (Australia) B Drewett	6	6	5
(Australia) P Johnston (Australia) J McCurdy	6	3	4
8	(United States) C Strode (United States) M Strode	3	6	6

Quarterfinals
4	(United States) T Gullikson (South Africa) B Mitton	6	6	7
8	(United States) C Strode (United States) M Strode	7	4	6

=== Bottom half ===
==== Section 3 ====
First round
7	(Australia) R Frawley (New Zealand) C Lewis	6	6
(United States) S Brawley (New Zealand) M Lewis	4	4
(United States) C Edwards (South Africa) E Edwards	6	6
(Australia) W Pascoe (United States) E Sherbeck	2	2
12	(United States) T Mayotte (United States) T Wilkison	6	6
WC	(Australia) J Harty (Australia) S Youl	4	2
WC	(Australia) J Frawley (Australia) M Kratzmann	3	3
3	(United States) F Buehning (United States) J Kriek	6	6

Second round
7	(Australia) R Frawley (New Zealand) C Lewis	6	2	6
(Australia) R Grant (Australia) S Maloney	4	6	4
(United States) C Edwards (South Africa) E Edwards	5	6
9	(Australia) J Alexander (Australia) J Fitzgerald	7	7
12	(United States) T Mayotte (United States) T Wilkison	6	4
(Australia) B Dyke (Australia) W Hampson	7	6
(Australia) W Masur (Australia) G Whitecross	4	4
3	(United States) F Buehning (United States) J Kriek	6	6

Third round
7	(Australia) R Frawley (New Zealand) C Lewis	4	5
9	(Australia) J Alexander (Australia) J Fitzgerald	6	7
(Australia) B Dyke (Australia) W Hampson	2	5
3	(United States) F Buehning (United States) J Kriek	6	7

Quarterfinals
9	(Australia) J Alexander (Australia) J Fitzgerald	7	3	6
3	(United States) F Buehning (United States) J Kriek	6	6	3

==== Section 4 ====
First round
(United States) R Crowley (United States) R Evett	6	2	3
(United States) D Gitlin (United States) N Saviano	4	6	6
(United States) M Estep (United States) T Giammalva	6	6
(Australia) C Limberger (Austria) G Mild	4	4
(United States) M Brunnberg (United States) D Siegler	6	7
(United Kingdom) R Lewis (United Kingdom) J Smith	3	5
(India) S Menon (New Zealand) R Simpson	6	5	4
2	(United States) P Rennert (United States) F Taygan	4	7	6

Second round
6	(Australia) S Ball (Australia) P Dent	7	7
(United States) D Gitlin (United States) N Saviano	5	6
(United States) M Estep (United States) T Giammalva	6	6	7
14	(United Kingdom) J Lloyd (United States) R Meyer	7	2	6
15	(United States) M Gandolfo (Australia) C Miller	6	7	6
(United States) M Brunnberg (United States) D Siegler	7	6	4
(Australia) K Barton (United Kingdom) N Brown	6	4
2	(United States) P Rennert (United States) F Taygan	7	6

Third round
6	(Australia) S Ball (Australia) P Dent	7	6	4
(United States) M Estep (United States) T Giammalva	6	7	6
15	(United States) M Gandolfo (Australia) C Miller	6	4
2	(United States) P Rennert (United States) F Taygan	7	6

Quarterfinals
(United States) M Estep (United States) T Giammalva	4	3
2	(United States) P Rennert (United States) F Taygan	6	6
