= 1983 Australian Open – Men's doubles =

Men's doubles
- 1983 Australian Open

Final
- Champion: (Australia) Mark Edmondson (Australia) Paul McNamee
- Runner-up: (United States) Steve Denton (United States) Sherwood Stewart
- Score: 6–3, 7–6^{(7–4)}

Details
- Draw: 48
- Seeds: 16

Events
Singles	men	women		boys	girls
Doubles	men	women	mixed	boys	girls
WC Singles	men	women	quad
WC Doubles	men	women	quad
Legends	men	women	mixed
- Australian Open

The men's doubles tournament at the 1983 Australian Open was held from 29 November through 11 December 1983 on the outdoor grass courts at the Kooyong Stadium in Melbourne, Australia. Mark Edmondson and Paul McNamee won the title, defeating Steve Denton and Sherwood Stewart in the final.

== Seeds ==
1. (United States) Peter Fleming / (United States) John McEnroe (third round)
2. (Australia) Mark Edmondson / (Australia) Paul McNamee (champions)
3. (Sweden) Anders Järryd / (Sweden) Hans Simonsson (third round)
4. (United States) Steve Denton / (United States) Sherwood Stewart (final)
5. (United States) Tom Gullikson / (United States) Tim Gullikson (semifinals)
6. (United States) Fritz Buehning / (United States) Johan Kriek (third round)
7. (United States) Mark Dickson / (Czechoslovakia) Tomáš Šmíd (third round)
8. (Australia) John Alexander / (Australia) John Fitzgerald (second round)
9. (United States) Sammy Giammalva / (United States) Tony Giammalva (second round)
10. (United States) Mike Bauer / (Australia) Pat Cash (quarterfinals)
11. (United States) Andy Andrews / (United States) John Sadri (second round)
12. (Australia) Broderick Dyke / (Australia) Rod Frawley (quarterfinals)
13. (United States) Drew Gitlin / (Australia) Craig Miller (second round)
14. (United States) David Dowlen / (Nigeria) Nduka Odizor (third round)
15. (Sweden) Joakim Nyström / (Sweden) Mats Wilander (quarterfinals)
16. (Australia) David Graham / (Australia) Laurie Warder (semifinals)

== Draw ==
Key

- Q = Qualifier
- WC = Wild card
- LL = Lucky loser
- Alt = Alternate
- ITF = ITF entry
- PR = Protected ranking
- SR = Special ranking
- SE = Special exempt
- JE = Junior exempt
- JR = Junior Accelerator Programme entrant
- CO = College Accelerator Programme entrant
- NG = Next Gen Accelerator Program entrant
- w/o = Walkover
- r = Retired
- d = Defaulted

=== Finals ===
Quarterfinals
15	(Sweden) Joakim Nyström (Sweden) Mats Wilander	6	5	4
5	(United States) Tom Gullikson (United States) Tim Gullikson	4	7	6
4	(United States) Steve Denton (United States) Sherwood Stewart	7	6
10	(United States) Mike Bauer (Australia) Pat Cash	6	3
12	(Australia) Broderick Dyke (Australia) Rod Frawley	6	7	3
16	(Australia) David Graham (Australia) Laurie Warder	7	5	6
(United States) Lloyd Bourne (United States) Matt Mitchell	6	4
2	(Australia) Mark Edmondson (Australia) Paul McNamee	7	6

Semifinals
5	(United States) Tom Gullikson (United States) Tim Gullikson	4	6	3
4	(United States) Steve Denton (United States) Sherwood Stewart	6	4	6
16	(Australia) David Graham (Australia) Laurie Warder	3	4
2	(Australia) Mark Edmondson (Australia) Paul McNamee	6	6

Final
4	(United States) Steve Denton (United States) Sherwood Stewart	3	6^{4}
2	(Australia) Mark Edmondson (Australia) Paul McNamee	6	7

=== Top half ===
==== Section 1 ====
First round
(Australia) W Masur (Australia) K Warwick	7	6
(Australia) P Doohan (Australia) M Fancutt	6	2
WC	(Australia) J Harty (Australia) D Tyson	7	3	4
(United States) E Korita (United Kingdom) J Lloyd	5	6	6
(Australia) P Johnston (Australia) J McCurdy	2	7	4
(United States) M Davis (Australia) W Hampson	6	6	6
(Brazil) M Hocevar (Hungary) Z Kuharszky	3	2
(United States) C Strode (United States) M Strode	6	6

Second round
1	(United States) P Fleming (United States) J McEnroe	6	6
(Australia) W Masur (Australia) K Warwick	3	4
(United States) E Korita (United Kingdom) J Lloyd	6	6	3
15	(Sweden) J Nyström (Sweden) M Wilander	4	6	7
14	(United States) D Dowlen (Nigeria) N Odizor	7	6
(United States) M Davis (Australia) W Hampson	6	4
(United States) C Strode (United States) M Strode	5	6
5	(United States) To Gullikson (United States) Ti Gullikson	7	7

Third round
1	(United States) P Fleming (United States) J McEnroe	3	6	2
15	(Sweden) J Nyström (Sweden) M Wilander	6	3	6
14	(United States) D Dowlen (Nigeria) N Odizor	5	3
5	(United States) To Gullikson (United States) Ti Gullikson	7	6

Quarterfinals
15	(Sweden) J Nyström (Sweden) M Wilander	6	5	4
5	(United States) To Gullikson (United States) Ti Gullikson	4	7	6

==== Section 2 ====
First round
(Australia) C Johnstone (United Kingdom) J Smith	6	5
(Netherlands) H van Boeckel (Australia) G Whitecross	7	6
(United States) H Pfister (United States) E Teltscher	w/o
(United States) J Gurfein (United States) J Van Nostrand
(New Zealand) M Lewis (New Zealand) D Mustard	6	6
(Sweden) S Edberg (United States) B Levine	4	4
(United States) M De Palmer (United States) B Testerman	7	6	6
(United States) K Flach (United States) R Seguso	6	7	8

Second round
4	(United States) S Denton (United States) S Stewart	6	6
(Netherlands) H van Boeckel (Australia) G Whitecross	4	2
(United States) H Pfister (United States) E Teltscher	6	6
11	(United States) A Andrews (United States) J Sadri	3	4
10	(United States) M Bauer (Australia) P Cash	6	6
(New Zealand) M Lewis (New Zealand) D Mustard	3	4
(United States) K Flach (United States) R Seguso	7	6
8	(Australia) J Alexander (Australia) J Fitzgerald	6	3

Third round
4	(United States) S Denton (United States) S Stewart	w/o
(United States) H Pfister (United States) E Teltscher
10	(United States) M Bauer (Australia) P Cash	2	6	6
(United States) K Flach (United States) R Seguso	6	3	2

Quarterfinals
4	(United States) S Denton (United States) S Stewart	7	6
10	(United States) M Bauer (Australia) P Cash	6	3

=== Bottom half ===
==== Section 3 ====
First round
(United States) L Shiras (New Zealand) J Simpson	6	6	9
(United States) S Brawley (United States) R Meyer	4	7	7
(United States) M Estep (Australia) C Fancutt	6	5
WC	(Australia) M Kratzmann (Australia) S Youl	7	7
(United Kingdom) M Guntrip (Brazil) E Oncins	3	3
(Australia) S Ball (Australia) C Letcher	6	6
(United States) V Gerulaitis (United States) B Teacher	3	7	^{r}
(United Kingdom) J Bates (New Zealand) B Derlin	6	6

Second round
6	(United States) F Buehning (United States) J Kriek	6	7
(United States) L Shiras (New Zealand) J Simpson	4	6
WC	(Australia) M Kratzmann (Australia) S Youl	6	4	4
12	(Australia) B Dyke (Australia) R Frawley	4	6	6
16	(Australia) D Graham (Australia) L Warder	5	6	8
(Australia) S Ball (Australia) C Letcher	7	4	6
(United Kingdom) J Bates (New Zealand) B Derlin	6	3	2
3	(Sweden) A Järryd (Sweden) H Simonsson	3	6	6

Third round
6	(United States) F Buehning (United States) J Kriek	2	7	3
12	(Australia) B Dyke (Australia) R Frawley	6	6	6
16	(Australia) D Graham (Australia) L Warder	w/o
3	(Sweden) A Järryd (Sweden) H Simonsson

Quarterfinals
12	(Australia) B Dyke (Australia) R Frawley	6	7	3
16	(Australia) D Graham (Australia) L Warder	7	5	6

==== Section 4 ====
First round
WC	(Australia) J Frawley (New Zealand) D Lewis	2	4
(Austria) P Feigl (New Zealand) R Simpson	6	6
(United States) L Bourne (United States) M Mitchell	6	7
WC	(Australia) B Custer (Australia) D Macpherson	2	6
(Australia) R Case (Australia) B Drewett	1	2
(United States) D Pate (United States) E Sherbeck	6	6
(United States) C Hooper (United States) L Stefanki	6	6
(United States) J Austin (United States) M Leach	7	7

Second round
7	(United States) M Dickson (Czechoslovakia) T Šmíd	6	6
(Austria) P Feigl (New Zealand) R Simpson	4	4
(United States) L Bourne (United States) M Mitchell	w/o
9	(United States) S Giammalva (United States) T Giammalva
13	(United States) D Gitlin (Australia) C Miller	6	2	5
(United States) D Pate (United States) E Sherbeck	3	6	7
(United States) J Austin (United States) M Leach	6	6	4
2	(Australia) M Edmondson (Australia) P McNamee	4	7	6

Third round
7	(United States) M Dickson (Czechoslovakia) T Šmíd	4	6
(United States) L Bourne (United States) M Mitchell	6	7
(United States) D Pate (United States) E Sherbeck	4	7	6
2	(Australia) M Edmondson (Australia) P McNamee	6	6	8

Quarterfinals
(United States) L Bourne (United States) M Mitchell	6	4
2	(Australia) M Edmondson (Australia) P McNamee	7	6
