= 1982 Australian Open – Women's singles qualifying =

Women's singles qualifying
- 1982 Australian Open

Events
Singles	men	women		boys	girls
Doubles	men	women	mixed	boys	girls
WC Singles	men	women	quad
WC Doubles	men	women	quad
Legends	men	women	mixed

Qualification
Singles	men	women
- Australian Open

This article displays the qualifying draw for women's singles at the 1982 Australian Open.

== Seeds ==
1. (Bulgaria) Manuela Maleeva (qualified)
2. (South Africa) Beverly Mould (first round)
3. (United States) Anna-Maria Fernandez (first round)
4. (United States) Barbara Jordan (first round)
5. (United States) Paula Smith (qualified)
6. (Australia) Sue Saliba (qualified)
7. (Australia) Chris O'Neil (qualified)
8. (United States) Kim Steinmetz (first round)

== Qualifiers ==
1. (Bulgaria) Manuela Maleeva
2. (Australia) Chris O'Neil
3. (Switzerland) Christiane Jolissaint
4. (Australia) Sue Saliba
5. (West Germany) Renáta Tomanová
6. (United States) Sherry Acker
7. (United States) Paula Smith
8. (Australia) Amanda Tobin

== Qualifying draw ==
Key

- Q = Qualifier
- WC = Wild card
- LL = Lucky loser
- Alt = Alternate
- ITF = ITF entry
- PR = Protected ranking
- SR = Special ranking
- SE = Special exempt
- JE = Junior exempt
- JR = Junior Accelerator Programme entrant
- CO = College Accelerator Programme entrant
- NG = Next Gen Accelerator Program entrant
- w/o = Walkover
- r = Retired
- d = Defaulted

=== First qualifier ===
First round
1	(Bulgaria) Manuela Maleeva	6	6
(Australia) Maree Booth	2	2
(Australia) Brenda Remilton-Ward	6	5	6
(United States) Kim Sands	3	7	3

Qualifying competition
1	(Bulgaria) Manuela Maleeva	6	6
(Australia) Brenda Remilton-Ward	2	4

=== Second qualifier ===
First round
(Australia) Rebecca Bryant	4	4
(Australia) Bernadette Randall	6	6
(Australia) Karen Smith	2	1
7	(Australia) Chris O'Neil	6	6

Qualifying competition
(Australia) Bernadette Randall	2	6	5
7	(Australia) Chris O'Neil	6	2	7

=== Third qualifier ===
First round
4	(United States) Barbara Jordan	6	6	1
(Switzerland) Christiane Jolissaint	7	4	6
(Switzerland) Lilian Drescher	6	6
(Austria) Petra Huber	3	3

Qualifying competition
(Switzerland) Christiane Jolissaint	6	7
(Switzerland) Lilian Drescher	4	5

=== Fourth qualifier ===
First round
(United Kingdom) Annabel Croft	3	0
(Australia) Elizabeth Minter	6	6
(Switzerland) Karin Stampfli	0	1
6	(Australia) Sue Saliba	6	6

Qualifying competition
(Australia) Elizabeth Minter	6	6	1
6	(Australia) Sue Saliba	7	4	6

=== Fifth qualifier ===
First round
8	(United States) Kim Steinmetz	3	5
(United States) Heather Ludloff	6	7
(West Germany) Renáta Tomanová	6	7
(United Kingdom) Julie Salmon	4	5

Qualifying competition
(United States) Heather Ludloff	3	6	5
(West Germany) Renáta Tomanová	6	1	7

=== Sixth qualifier ===
First round
(Australia) Annette Gulley	2	6
(United States) Sherry Acker	6	7
(United States) Renee Blount	6	6
3	(United States) Anna-Maria Fernandez	3	1

Qualifying competition
(United States) Sherry Acker	6	3	6
(United States) Renee Blount	3	6	1

=== Seventh qualifier ===
First round
5	(United States) Paula Smith	6	2	6
(Netherlands) Yvette Flu	2	6	1
(Sweden) Lena Sandin	6	6
(Sweden) Catrin Jexell	4	2

Qualifying competition
5	(United States) Paula Smith	5	6	6
(Sweden) Lena Sandin	7	0	4

=== Eighth qualifier ===
First round
(United Kingdom) Amanda Brown	6	6	2
(Australia) Amanda Tobin	7	2	6
(Australia) Pam Whytcross	6	6
2	(South Africa) Beverly Mould	2	4

Qualifying competition
(Australia) Amanda Tobin	6	3	6
(Australia) Pam Whytcross	3	6	0
