= 1982 Australian Open – Men's singles =

Men's singles
- 1982 Australian Open

Final
- Champion: (United States) Johan Kriek
- Runner-up: (United States) Steve Denton
- Score: 6–3, 6–3, 6–2

Details
- Draw: 96
- Seeds: 16

Events
Singles	men	women		boys	girls
Doubles	men	women	mixed	boys	girls
WC Singles	men	women	quad
WC Doubles	men	women	quad
Legends	men	women	mixed
- Australian Open

Defending champion Johan Kriek defeated Steve Denton in a rematch of the previous year's final, 6–3, 6–3, 6–2 to win the men's singles tennis title at the 1982 Australian Open. It was his second and last major singles title. Kriek saved a match point en route to the title, against Paul McNamee in the semifinals. The format of this year's tournament was best-of-five-sets in the first two rounds, best-of-three-sets in rounds 3 and 4, then best-of-five-sets again for the rest of the tournament.

This was the first Australian Open to have a fourth round, aligning with the other three major tournaments.

== Seeds ==
The seeded players are listed below. Johan Kriek is the champion; others show the round in which they were eliminated.

1. (United States) Johan Kriek (champion)
2. (United States) Steve Denton (final)
3. (Australia) Mark Edmondson (first round)
4. (United States) Brian Teacher (quarterfinals)
5. (United States) Tim Mayotte (third round)
6. (United States) Hank Pfister (semifinals)
7. (Australia) John Alexander (fourth round)
8. (New Zealand) Chris Lewis (third round)
9. (United States) John Sadri (fourth round)
10. (United States) Tim Wilkison (third round)
11. (United States) Jeff Borowiak (fourth round)
12. (Paraguay) Víctor Pecci (first round)
13. (Australia) Phil Dent (fourth round)
14. (New Zealand) Russell Simpson (second round)
15. (United States) Fritz Buehning (first round)
16. (Australia) Paul McNamee (semifinals)

== Draw ==
Key

- Q = Qualifier
- WC = Wild card
- LL = Lucky loser
- Alt = Alternate
- ITF = ITF entry
- PR = Protected ranking
- SR = Special ranking
- SE = Special exempt
- JE = Junior exempt
- JR = Junior Accelerator Programme entrant
- CO = College Accelerator Programme entrant
- NG = Next Gen Accelerator Program entrant
- w/o = Walkover
- r = Retired
- d = Defaulted

=== Final eight ===
Quarterfinals
1	(United States) Johan Kriek	6	6	6
(United States) Drew Gitlin	0	4	1
(Australia) Pat Cash	4	7	3	4
16	(Australia) Paul McNamee	6	6	6	6
6	(United States) Hank Pfister	6	6	6	1	7
4	(United States) Brian Teacher	1	3	7	6	6
(United States) Sammy Giammalva Jr.	6	3	3	6	3
2	(United States) Steve Denton	4	6	6	2	6

Semifinals
1	(United States) Johan Kriek	7	7	4	3	7
16	(Australia) Paul McNamee	6	6	6	6	5
6	(United States) Hank Pfister	4	6	3	6	6
2	(United States) Steve Denton	6	4	6	3	7

Final
1	(United States) Johan Kriek	6	6	6
2	(United States) Steve Denton	3	3	2

=== Section 1 ===
First round
(United States) M De Palmer	6	6	4	6	7
(United States) T Gullikson	3	3	6	7	5
Q	(United States) J Farrow	6	3	6	6
Q	(United States) E Sherbeck	7	6	3	7
(United States) R Evett	7	3	6	3
(Australia) D Collings	6	6	7	6
(United States) L Stefanki	6	4	6
14	(New Zealand) R Simpson	7	6	7

Second round
1	(United States) J Kriek	6	3	6	7
(United States) M De Palmer	3	6	2	6
Q	(United States) E Sherbeck	4	7	7	2	7
(Australia) W Hampson	6	6	6	6	6
(Australia) CA Miller	6	3	4
(Australia) D Collings	7	6	6
(Australia) C Fancutt	6	7	6
14	(New Zealand) R Simpson	3	5	1

Third round
1	(United States) J Kriek	6	7
Q	(United States) E Sherbeck	1	6
(Australia) D Collings	6	3
(Australia) C Fancutt	7	6

Fourth round
1	(United States) J Kriek	6	6
(Australia) C Fancutt	2	2

=== Section 2 ===
First round
12	(Paraguay) V Pecci, Sr.	6	7	2	4	5
(United States) A Andrews	4	6	6	6	7
(Austria) B Pils	2	7	2	6	6
(Australia) M Kratzmann	6	6	6	0	1
(West Germany) D Keretić	0	3	6	6	6
(Australia) G Whitecross	6	6	2	2	4
(United States) D Siegler	6	3	0
5	(United States) T Mayotte	7	6	6

Second round
(United States) A Andrews	3	3	7	2
(United States) D Gitlin	6	6	5	6
(United States) M Estep	4	4	7	6	7
(Austria) B Pils	6	6	6	3	5
(New Zealand) B Derlin	4	4	4
(West Germany) D Keretić	6	6	6
(Paraguay) F González	6	3	2
5	(United States) T Mayotte	7	6	6

Third round
(United States) D Gitlin	4	6	7
(United States) M Estep	6	1	6
(West Germany) D Keretić	7	6
5	(United States) T Mayotte	6	4

Fourth round
(United States) D Gitlin	6	6
(West Germany) D Keretić	3	4

=== Section 3 ===
First round
3	(Australia) M Edmondson	4	6	3	4
(United States) R Meyer	6	2	6	6
(Australia) B Drewett	6	4	6	6	6
(Australia) W Masur	2	6	7	4	7
Q	(Australia) W Horskins	2	3	0
Q	(Australia) J Stoddart	6	6	6
(United States) F Taygan	1	6	1
10	(United States) T Wilkison	6	7	6

Second round
(United States) R Meyer	5	6	6	5
(South Africa) B Mitton	7	3	7	7
(Australia) W Masur	6	7	6
(United States) MS Strode	3	5	4
(Australia) P Cash	6	6	6
Q	(Australia) J Stoddart	2	2	2
Q	(Australia) H Hansson	7	1	6	1	2
10	(United States) T Wilkison	5	6	3	6	6

Third round
(South Africa) B Mitton	2	7	6
(Australia) W Masur	6	5	7
(Australia) P Cash	7	6
10	(United States) T Wilkison	5	1

Fourth round
(Australia) W Masur	4	2
(Australia) P Cash	6	6

=== Section 4 ===
First round
Q	(Australia) K Barton	7	4	3	6	4
(Austria) P Feigl	6	6	6	4	6
(United States) B Testerman	6	7	2	6
Q	(Australia) R Case	1	5	6	3
(United States) M Brunnberg	2	6	7	6	7
(New Zealand) D Mustard	6	7	6	4	5
(United States) CB Strode	6	4	6	2
(Australia) R Frawley	7	6	4	6

Second round
16	(Australia) P McNamee	6	6	6	6
(Austria) P Feigl	2	7	3	3
(United States) B Testerman	7	7	7
(Australia) P Johnston	6	6	6
(United States) M Brunnberg	6	2	6	7	6
(India) S Menon	7	6	4	5	4
(Australia) R Frawley	4	7	4	2
8	(New Zealand) C Lewis	6	5	6	6

Third round
16	(Australia) P McNamee	6	6
(United States) B Testerman	4	0
(United States) M Brunnberg	2	6	7
8	(New Zealand) C Lewis	6	4	5

Fourth round
16	(Australia) P McNamee	6	4	6
(United States) M Brunnberg	3	6	3

=== Section 5 ===
First round
6	(United States) H Pfister	6	6	2	6
(Australia) C Letcher	4	3	6	3
(Australia) B Guan	6	6	1	6
(Australia) S Youl	2	4	6	1
(Sweden) H Sundström	6	6	7	6
Q	(Austria) G Mild	0	7	6	2
LL	(Australia) D Graham	0	1	0
9	(United States) J Sadri	6	6	6

Second round
6	(United States) H Pfister	6	6	7
Q	(United States) M Freedman	1	2	6
(Australia) B Guan	7	6	6
Q	(Australia) L Warder	6	4	4
Q	(Australia) J McCurdy	7	4	6	4	7
(Sweden) H Sundström	5	6	4	6	5
(United States) M Gandolfo	3	4	2
9	(United States) J Sadri	6	6	6

Third round
6	(United States) H Pfister	6	7
(Australia) B Guan	2	6
Q	(Australia) J McCurdy	5	6
9	(United States) J Sadri	7	7

Fourth round
6	(United States) H Pfister	6	4	6
9	(United States) J Sadri	3	6	2

=== Section 6 ===
First round
13	(Australia) P Dent	6	6
(New Zealand) J Simpson	4	1	r
(Australia) S Ball	4	6	6	3	7
(United Kingdom) J Smith	6	4	3	6	5
(United States) L Bourne	5	4	6	6	3
(West Germany) H Theissen	7	6	1	3	6
(United States) M Leach	5	4	5
4	(United States) B Teacher	7	6	7

Second round
13	(Australia) P Dent	4	7	6	6	6
(United States) N Saviano	6	5	7	1	3
(France) G Forget	6	7	6
(Australia) S Ball	4	5	2
(West Germany) H Theissen	6	3	4	4
(United States) M Bauer	2	6	6	6
(Australia) B Dyke	2	3	2
4	(United States) B Teacher	6	6	6

Third round
13	(Australia) P Dent	5	7	6
(France) G Forget	7	6	2
(United States) M Bauer	2	7	3
4	(United States) B Teacher	6	5	6

Fourth round
13	(Australia) P Dent	4	2
4	(United States) B Teacher	6	6

=== Section 7 ===
First round
7	(Australia) J Alexander	6	6	6
(United States) A Kohlberg	3	3	1
(United Kingdom) J Lloyd	7	3	1	2
Q	(United States) J Meyers	5	6	6	6
(United States) M Mitchell	5	6	2	6
(United Kingdom) R Lewis	7	1	6	7
(Australia) C Johnstone	6	6	5	4	6
15	(United States) F Buehning	4	3	7	6	3

Second round
7	(Australia) J Alexander	6	1	6	6
(South Africa) E Edwards	3	6	2	1
Q	(United States) J Meyers	3	1	7	6	3
(Australia) J Fitzgerald	6	6	6	4	6
(United Kingdom) R Lewis	7	3	4	4
(United States) B Kleege	6	6	6	6
(United States) S Giammalva, Jr.	3	6	7	2	6
(Australia) C Johnstone	6	1	5	6	4

Third round
7	(Australia) J Alexander	6	7
(Australia) J Fitzgerald	4	6
(United States) B Kleege	2	2
(United States) S Giammalva, Jr.	6	6

Fourth round
7	(Australia) J Alexander	6	6	1
(United States) S Giammalva, Jr.	4	7	6

=== Section 8 ===
First round
11	(United States) J Borowiak	6	6	6
(Australia) P Carter	3	4	3
(United States) C Edwards	4	4	2
(United States) D Pate	6	6	6
(United States) M Barr	3	4	5
(Australia) W Maher	6	6	7
(United States) T Giammalva	6	6	6	3
2	(United States) S Denton	4	7	7	6

Second round
11	(United States) J Borowiak	6	6	6
(Australia) J Harty	1	4	2
(United States) P Rennert	6	6	4	7
(United States) D Pate	4	3	6	5
(United States) T Cain	6	2	4	3
(Australia) W Maher	1	6	6	6
(Australia) J Frawley	1	2	6	3
2	(United States) S Denton	6	6	3	6

Third round
11	(United States) J Borowiak	7	6
(United States) P Rennert	6	1
(Australia) W Maher	2	5
2	(United States) S Denton	6	7

Fourth round
11	(United States) J Borowiak	6	3
2	(United States) S Denton	7	6

Preceded by 1982 US Open	Grand Slam men's singles	Succeeded by 1983 French Open
