= 1983 Australian Open – Women's singles qualifying =

Women's singles qualifying
- 1983 Australian Open

Events
Singles	men	women		boys	girls
Doubles	men	women	mixed	boys	girls
WC Singles	men	women	quad
WC Doubles	men	women	quad
Legends	men	women	mixed

Qualification
Singles	men	women
- Australian Open

This article displays the qualifying draw for women's singles at the 1983 Australian Open.

== Seeds ==
1. (United Kingdom) Amanda Brown (qualified)
2. (France) Nathalie Herreman (qualifying competition)
3. (Australia) Chris O'Neil (qualifying competition)
4. (Australia) Bernadette Randall (qualified)
5. (United States) Ann Henricksson (qualifying competition)
6. (Socialist Federal Republic of Yugoslavia) Renata Šašak (first round)
7. (United Kingdom) Annabel Croft (qualifying competition)
8. (United States) Laura Bernstein (qualified)

== Qualifiers ==
1. (United Kingdom) Amanda Brown
2. (United States) Laura Bernstein
3. (Australia) Bernadette Randall
4. (Australia) Amanda Tobin
5. (United States) Lori McNeil
6. (France) Sophie Amiach
7. (United States) Gigi Fernández
8. (United States) Robin White

== Qualifying draw ==
Key

- Q = Qualifier
- WC = Wild card
- LL = Lucky loser
- Alt = Alternate
- ITF = ITF entry
- PR = Protected ranking
- SR = Special ranking
- SE = Special exempt
- JE = Junior exempt
- JR = Junior Accelerator Programme entrant
- CO = College Accelerator Programme entrant
- NG = Next Gen Accelerator Program entrant
- w/o = Walkover
- r = Retired
- d = Defaulted

=== First qualifier ===
First round
1	(United Kingdom) Amanda Brown	6	7
(Switzerland) Hana Strachoňová	1	6
(United States) Kris Kinney	3	3
(West Germany) Andrea Betzner	6	6

Qualifying competition
1	(United Kingdom) Amanda Brown	6	6
(West Germany) Andrea Betzner	4	2

=== Second qualifier ===
First round
(United Kingdom) Julie Salmon	6	6
(Australia) Natalia Leipus	4	3
(Australia) Michelle Turk	3	0
8	(United States) Laura Bernstein	6	6

Qualifying competition
(United Kingdom) Julie Salmon	3	2
8	(United States) Laura Bernstein	6	6

=== Third qualifier ===
First round
4	(Australia) Bernadette Randall	0	6	6
(United Kingdom) Sara Gomer	6	4	3
(Australia) Helen Davis	7	3	3
(United States) Betsy Heidenberger	6	6	6

Qualifying competition
4	(Australia) Bernadette Randall	6	7
(United States) Betsy Heidenberger	2	5

=== Fourth qualifier ===
First round
(Australia) Amanda Tobin	6	6
(Japan) Naoko Sato	1	1
(Australia) Nerida Gregory	2	4
5	(United States) Ann Henricksson	6	6

Qualifying competition
(Australia) Amanda Tobin	6	5	6
5	(United States) Ann Henricksson	0	7	1

=== Fifth qualifier ===
First round
6	(Socialist Federal Republic of Yugoslavia) Renata Šašak	7	0	1
(West Germany) Myriam Schropp	6	6	6
(Australia) Debbie Freeman	6	4
(United States) Lori McNeil	7	6

Qualifying competition
(West Germany) Myriam Schropp	2	5
(United States) Lori McNeil	6	7

=== Sixth qualifier ===
First round
(Australia) Jenny Byrne	2	6	3
(France) Sophie Amiach	6	2	6
(Australia) Annette Gulley	1	6	0
3	(Australia) Chris O'Neil	6	3	6

Qualifying competition
(France) Sophie Amiach	3	6	6
3	(Australia) Chris O'Neil	6	0	3

=== Seventh qualifier ===
First round
7	(United Kingdom) Annabel Croft	7	6
(United Kingdom) Cathy Drury	6	0
(United States) Gigi Fernández	6	6
(Japan) Masako Yanagi	4	3

Qualifying competition
7	(United Kingdom) Annabel Croft	4	3
(United States) Gigi Fernández	6	6

=== Eighth qualifier ===
First round
(Australia) Brenda Remilton-Ward	4	6	1
(United States) Robin White	6	1	6
(Australia) Karen Smith	4	6	7
2	(France) Nathalie Herreman	6	2	9

Qualifying competition
(United States) Robin White	7	6
2	(France) Nathalie Herreman	5	0
