= Craig A. Miller =

Australian tennis player (1962–2021)

Craig Miller
- Country (sports): Australia
- Born: 18 October 1962 Young, New South Wales, Australia
- Died: August 2021 (aged 58–59)
- Height: 188 cm (6 ft 2 in)
- Plays: Right-handed
- Prize money: $139,258

Singles
- Career record: 29–54
- Career titles: 0
- Highest ranking: No. 102 (3 January 1983)

Grand Slam singles results
- Australian Open: 2R (1979)
- French Open: 1R (1983)
- Wimbledon: 2R (1983, 1984)

Doubles
- Career record: 57–66
- Career titles: 2
- Highest ranking: No. 64 (2 January 1984)

Grand Slam doubles results
- Australian Open: SF (1985)
- French Open: 1R (1983, 1984)
- Wimbledon: 3R (1982, 1983)
- US Open: 1R (1980, 1983, 1984)

Craig A. Miller (18 October 1962 – August 2021) was a professional tennis player from Australia.

== Junior years ==
Miller was the boys' singles champion at the 1980 Australian Open, beating Wally Masur in the final. The Australian had been runner-up the previous year, to Greg Whitecross. He was also a semi-finalist at the 1980 US Open and with Pat Cash won the doubles title at the 1982 Australian Open.

== Professional career ==
In 1982, Miller was a quarter-finalist at the Sydney Outdoor tournament and lost in the doubles final of the New South Wales Open, partnering Cliff Letcher.

The following year he made the semi-finals of the Melbourne Outdoor event. Also in 1983, Miller had a win over John Lloyd in the Wimbledon Championships and won two doubles titles, at Hong Kong and Adelaide, both times in an unseeded pairing.

Miller and partner Laurie Warder were semi-finalists at the 1985 Australian Open.

In 1986, he started the season well by reaching the singles quarter-finals at Auckland but wouldn't appear on tour again until September, as a result of a benign tumour that he had to have removed from his vocal cords. During this time he wasn't able to travel overseas due to restrictions on his medication and he instead spent his time coaching at the Australian Institute of Sport. He played for another year and a half, before retiring after the 1988 Australian Open.

== Coaching ==
Miller was the head development coach of Tennis Australia for seven years and later ran his own tennis program, IQ Tennis.

== Grand Prix career finals ==
=== Doubles: 3 (2–1) ===
Result	W-L	Date	Tournament	Surface	Partner	Opponents	Score
Loss	0–1	Dec 1982	Sydney, Australia	Grass	(Australia) Cliff Letcher	(Australia) John Alexander (Australia) John Fitzgerald	4–6, 6–7
Win	1–1	Nov 1983	Hong Kong	Hard	(United States) Drew Gitlin	(United States) Sammy Giammalva Jr. (United States) Steve Meister	6–2, 6–2
Win	2–1	Dec 1983	Adelaide, Australia	Grass	(United States) Eric Sherbeck	(Australia) Broderick Dyke (Australia) Rod Frawley	6–3, 4–6, 6–4

== Challenger titles ==
=== Doubles: (2) ===
No.	Year	Tournament	Surface	Partner	Opponents	Score
1.	1981	Brisbane, Australia	Grass	(Australia) Chris Johnstone	(Australia) Brad Drewett (Australia) Warren Maher	6–4, 7–5
2.	1982	Tokyo, Japan	Clay	(Australia) Pat Cash	(New Zealand) Bruce Derlin (New Zealand) David Mustard	6–2, 6–2

== Death ==
Miller died in August 2021 after suffering from throat cancer.
