= Kevin Cook =

Kevin Cook may refer to:

- Kevin Cook (basketball), American basketball coach
- Kevin Cook (politician), American politician, member of the Idaho Senate
- Kevin Cook (tennis), American tennis player

== See also ==
- Kevin Cooke, American politician, member of the Georgia House of Representatives
