= Matthew McDonald (disambiguation) =

Matthew or Matt McDonald may refer to:-

- Matt McDonald (Born 1958), American tennis player
- Matt McDonald (runner) (born 1993), American distance runner
- Matthew McDonald (footballer, born November 2002) (born 2002), English footballer for Warrington Town, see 2024–25 Rochdale A.F.C. season

== See also ==
- Matt Macdonald
