= Harald Theissen =

German tennis player

- Country (sports): West Germany
- Born: 23 March 1959 (age 65); Troisdorf; West Germany
- Plays: Right-handed
- Prize money: $36,019

Singles
- Career record: 6–11
- Career titles: 0
- Highest ranking: No. 214 (3 January 1983)

Grand Slam singles results
- Australian Open: 2R (1982)

Doubles
- Career record: 4–16
- Career titles: 0
- Highest ranking: No. 178 (7 July 1986)

Grand Slam doubles results
- Australian Open: 1R (1982)

Harald Theissen (born 23 March 1959) is a former professional tennis player from Germany.

== Career ==
Theissen competed in the 1982 Australian Open and won a five set match over Lloyd Bourne in the opening round of the singles draw, before losing in the second round to Mike Bauer. In the men's doubles he and partner Damir Keretić lost in the first round to Peter Johnston and John McCurdy.
