= Steve Maloney =

Steve Maloney may refer to:

- Steve Maloney, bassist for the band The Blood Divine.
- Stephen Maloney, Australian tennis player
