= Mark Hartnett =

Australian tennis player

- Country (sports): Australia
- Plays: Left-handed

Singles
- Highest ranking: No. 400 (23 Mar 1987)

Grand Slam singles results
- Australian Open: Q2 (1981, 1982, 1987)

Doubles
- Career record: 0–2
- Highest ranking: No. 308 (25 Jun 1984)

Grand Slam doubles results
- Australian Open: 1R (1982)

Mark Hartnett (born 1960s) is an Australian former professional tennis player.

Hartnett, a top ranked Victorian junior, was trained at the AIS and won the boys' doubles title at the 1982 Australian Open. A left-handed player, he was a contemporary of Pat Cash and often partnered with the future Wimbledon winner in junior tournaments.

Now a tennis coach, Hartnett runs the Pro Tennis Academy in Melbourne with his wife, former player Lisa Keller. He was named Tennis Victoria Coach of the Year in 2003.

== ATP Challenger finals ==
=== Doubles: 1 (0–1) ===
No.	Result	Date	Tournament	Surface	Partner	Opponents	Score
Loss	1.	Jan 1984	Perth, Australia	Grass	(Australia) Peter Carter	(Australia) Broderick Dyke (United States) John Van Nostrand	2–6, 3–6
