= Jamie Harty =

Australian professional tennis player

- Country (sports): Australia
- Plays: Left-handed

Singles
- Career record: 0–1
- Highest ranking: No. 503 (2 Jan 1984)

Grand Slam singles results
- Australian Open: 2R (1982)

Doubles
- Career record: 0–4
- Highest ranking: No. 375 (2 Jan 1984)

Grand Slam doubles results
- Australian Open: 1R (1982, 1983, 1984)

Jamie Harty is an Australian former professional tennis player.

Harty, a Wollongong native, trained at the Australian Institute of Sport and was runner-up to Pat Cash at the U16s national championships in 1980. A left-handed player, he competed in the men's singles main draw of the 1982 Australian Open. In 1983 he partnered with Des Tyson to win the Australian Open boys' doubles title.
