= Jack Kruger (tennis) =

American tennis player

- Country (sports): United States

Singles
- Career record: 0–1
- Highest ranking: No. 450 (January 3, 1983)

Grand Slam singles results
- Wimbledon: Q2 (1983)

Doubles
- Career record: 0–1
- Highest ranking: No. 507 (January 3, 1983)

Grand Slam doubles results
- Wimbledon: 1R (1983)

Jack Kruger is an American former professional tennis player.

Kruger, a La Jolla-based player, was active during the 1980s. He was a collegiate tennis player for the USC Trojans and featured mostly in satellite tournaments on the professional tour. In his only Grand Prix main draw appearance, at Maui in 1982, Kruger lost a first round match to Butch Walts in three sets. He qualified for the men's doubles main draw of the 1983 Wimbledon Championships with partner Randy Druz and made the second qualifying round in singles.
