= Mike Brunnberg =

Swedish-born American tennis player

- Full name: Mike Brunnberg
- Country (sports): United States
- Born: May 4, 1958 (age 67); Stockholm, Sweden
- Plays: Right-handed

Singles
- Career record: 9–16
- Career titles: 0
- Highest ranking: No. 165 (January 3, 1983)

Grand Slam singles results
- Australian Open: 4R (1982)
- Wimbledon: 1R (1983)
- US Open: 2R (1982)

Doubles
- Career record: 9–18
- Career titles: 0
- Highest ranking: No. 193 (January 3, 1983)

Grand Slam doubles results
- Australian Open: 2R (1982)
- French Open: 1R (1982)
- US Open: 2R (1982)

Mike Brunnberg (born May 4, 1958) is a Swedish born American former professional tennis player.

== Biography ==
=== Early life ===
Brunnberg was born in Stockholm and grew up in Miami.

A graduate of the University of Miami, he turned professional in 1981.

=== Professional career ===
His best performance on the Grand Prix circuit came at the Caracas Open in 1982 when he made the quarter-finals in the singles and was a semi-finalist in the doubles.

He won his first Grand Slam match as a qualifier at the 1982 US Open, defeating former top 20 player Pat DuPré in five sets, before being eliminated in the second round by Vincent Van Patten.

At the 1982 Australian Open he won twice from two sets down to make the fourth round. He started the tournament with back to back comeback wins over David Mustard, then Sashi Menon. After upsetting eighth seed Chris Lewis in the third round, over three sets, he was beaten in the round of 16 by local player Paul McNamee, in another three setter. Both of those matches were best of three as the tournament had a curtailed format, meaning that all of his four matches went the maximum number of sets.

He made one further Grand Slam appearance, which was at the 1983 Wimbledon Championships, where he featured in another five set match, on this occasion a loss, to Andreas Maurer in the opening round.
