= 1983 Monterrey Cup =

Men's tennis tournament

- Date: February 28 – March 6
- Edition: 5th
- Category: Grand Prix
- Draw: 32S / 16D
- Prize money: $75,000
- Surface: Carpet / indoor
- Location: Monterrey, Mexico

Champions

Singles
- (United States) Sammy Giammalva

Doubles
- (Nigeria) Nduka Odizor / (United States) David Dowlen
← 1982 ·	Monterrey WCT

The 1983 Monterrey Cup, also known as the Copa Monterrey, was a men's tennis tournament played on indoor carpet courts in Monterrey, Mexico. The event was part of the 1983 Volvo Grand Prix circuit. It was the fifth and last edition of the tournament and was held from February 28 through March 6, 1983. First-seeded Sammy Giammalva won the singles title.

== Finals ==
=== Singles ===
(United States) Sammy Giammalva defeated (United States) Ben Testerman 6–4, 3–6, 6–3

- It was Giammalva's 1st singles title of the year and the 2nd of his career.

=== Doubles ===
(Nigeria) Nduka Odizor / (United States) David Dowlen defeated (United States) Andy Andrews / (United States) John Sadri 3–6, 6–3, 6–4
