= Garth Haynes =

American tennis player

- Country (sports): United States

Singles
- Career record: 0–1
- Highest ranking: No. 369 (January 3, 1983)

Grand Slam singles results
- Wimbledon: Q2 (1983)
- US Open: Q? (1983)

Doubles
- Career record: 2–5
- Highest ranking: No. 233 (January 3, 1983)

Grand Slam doubles results
- Wimbledon: 1R (1983)
- US Open: 1R (1983)

Garth Haynes is an American former professional tennis player.

A native of Orinda, California, Haynes was a collegiate tennis player for Pepperdine University, competing in the 1979 and 1980 NCAA Division I championships. Active on the professional tour in the 1980s, he reached best rankings of 369 in singles and 233 in doubles. In 1983 he featured in the men's doubles main draws at both Wimbledon and US Open.
