= Martin Guntrip =

British tennis player

- Country (sports): Great Britain
- Born: July 18, 1960 (age 65) Kent, England

Singles
- Highest ranking: No. 390 (2 Jan 1984)

Grand Slam singles results
- Australian Open: Q1 (1983)
- Wimbledon: Q2 (1983)

Doubles
- Career record: 0–4
- Highest ranking: No. 289 (2 Jan 1984)

Grand Slam doubles results
- Australian Open: 1R (1983)
- Wimbledon: 1R (1982)

Grand Slam mixed doubles results
- Wimbledon: 2R (1981, 1982)

Martin Guntrip (born 18 July 1960) is a British former professional tennis player.

Guntrip, a native of Kent, was a varsity tennis player for Flagler College in Florida, earning NAIA All-American honours in 1981. While competing on the professional tour in the early 1980s he made doubles main draw appearances at Wimbledon. He is the current Director of the All England Lawn Tennis Club.
