= Glenn Busby =

Australian tennis player

- Country (sports): Australia
- Born: 1956 (age 68–69)
- Plays: Right-handed

Singles
- Career record: 0–2
- Highest ranking: No. 326 (14 June 1976)

Grand Slam singles results
- Australian Open: 1R (1976)

Doubles
- Career record: 0–2

Glenn Busby (born 1956) is an Australian former professional tennis player.

Busby won the 1975 Australian Open boys' doubles title with Warren Maher. He featured in the men's singles main draw of the 1976 Australian Open, losing in the first round to David Carter in four sets.

Away from the tour he played Melbourne pennant tennis for Doncaster.

Now competing on the ITF Masters tour, Busby has won several world championship titles.
