= Kevin Cook (tennis) =

American tennis player

- Country (sports): United States

Singles
- Highest ranking: No. 396 (Jan 4, 1982)

Grand Slam singles results
- Australian Open: Q1 (1981)
- Wimbledon: Q1 (1981)

Doubles
- Career record: 2–4

Grand Slam doubles results
- French Open: 1R (1981)
- Wimbledon: Q1 (1981)

Kevin Cook is an American former professional tennis player.

Cook, a native of Midland, Michigan, played collegiate tennis for the University of Florida, earning All-SEC selection in 1979. His professional tennis career included a doubles main draw appearance at the 1981 French Open.

== ATP Challenger finals ==
=== Doubles: 1 (0–1) ===
No.	Result	Date	Tournament	Surface	Partner	Opponents	Score
Loss	1.	Apr 1981	San Luis Potosí, Mexico	Clay	(United States) Rich Andrews	(Australia) Brad Drewett (United States) George Hardie	7–5, 3–6, 6–7
