= Stephen Maloney =

Australian tennis player (1960–2021)

- Full name: Stephen Thomas Maloney
- Country (sports): Australia
- Born: 8 July 1960
- Died: 1 March 2021 (aged 60)
- Plays: Right-handed

Singles
- Highest ranking: No. 602 (2 Jan 1984)

Grand Slam singles results
- Australian Open: Q2 (1982)

Doubles
- Career record: 2–5
- Highest ranking: No. 175 (3 Jan 1983)

Grand Slam doubles results
- Australian Open: 2R (1982)

Stephen Thomas Maloney (8 July 1960 – 1 March 2021) was an Australian professional tennis player.

Maloney was the top ranked junior in Canberra at the age of 16 and won the national Under-19 Hardcourt Championships in 1977. He received a scholarship to play collegiate tennis for the University of Georgia and was there from 1978 to 1980, before deciding to turn professional.

While competing on the professional circuit in the 1980s he was most successful in doubles and had a main draw appearance at the 1982 Australian Open, with his regular tour doubles partner Roger Grant.
