= John Van Nostrand =

American tennis player

- Country (sports): United States
- Born: July 17, 1961; Long Island, New York
- Died: April 15, 1984 (aged 22) near San Juan del Río, Mexico
- Height: 6 ft 2 in (1.88 m)
- Plays: Right-handed

Singles
- Career record: 2–3
- Career titles: 0
- Highest ranking: No. 220 (January 2, 1984)

Doubles
- Career record: 8–8
- Career titles: 1
- Highest ranking: No. 239 (January 2, 1984)

Grand Slam doubles results
- Australian Open: 1R (1983)

John Van Nostrand (July 17, 1961 – April 15, 1984) was a professional tennis player from the United States. His sister Molly Van Nostrand also played tennis professionally. Both were coached by their father, Kingdon Van Nostrand.

== Career ==
Van Nostrand was a dual NCAA All-American for Pepperdine University, in 1982 and 1983.

He appeared in the main draw of one Grand Slam during his career, the 1983 Australian Open, in the men's doubles, but never got to play a point, as he and partner Jim Gurfein defaulted the match.

The American was a quarter-finalist at the 1983 Hall of Fame Tennis Championships, held in Newport, Rhode Island. He beat world number 46 Mike De Palmer in the opening round and Mike Leach in the second round.

In the first tournament of the 1984 Grand Prix season, at Auckland, Van Nostrand and partner Brian Levine were doubles champions. The pair upset top seeds Broderick Dyke and Rod Frawley in the quarter-finals.

Three months later, Van Nostrand was killed in a car accident, along with fellow player Joe Heldmann. They had been traveling from Mexico City to the San Luis Potosí Challenger tournament. On a mountainous road near San Juan del Río, their car went off a curve and fell 660 feet down the mountain.

== Grand Prix career finals ==
=== Doubles: 1 (1–0) ===
Result	W-L	Date	Tournament	Surface	Partner	Opponents	Score
Win	1–0	Jan 1984	Auckland, New Zealand	Hard	(South Africa) Brian Levine	(Australia) Brad Drewett (United States) Chip Hooper	7–5, 6–2

== Challenger titles ==
=== Doubles: (1) ===
No.	Year	Tournament	Surface	Partner	Opponents	Score
1.	1984	Perth, Australia	Grass	(Australia) Broderick Dyke	(Australia) Peter Carter (Australia) Mark Hartnett	6–2, 6–3
