= Gerald Mild =

Austrian tennis player and coach

- Country (sports): Austria
- Born: 8 April 1962 (age 62); Salzburg, Austria
- Plays: Right-handed

Singles
- Career record: 1–4
- Career titles: 0
- Highest ranking: No. 275 (2 Jan 1984)

Grand Slam singles results
- Australian Open: 1R (1982)

Doubles
- Career record: 0–10
- Career titles: 0
- Highest ranking: No. 223 (2 Jan 1984)

Grand Slam doubles results
- Australian Open: 1R (1982)

Gerald Mild (born 8 April 1962) is a former professional tennis player from Austria.

== Career ==
In Davis Cup tennis, Mild represented Austria in a total of five ties in 1982 and 1983. He won all three of his singles matches as well as two doubles rubbers.

Mild competed in the main singles draw at the 1982 Australian Open and was beaten in four sets by Henrik Sundström in the opening round. He also took part in the doubles, with Carl Limberger. The pair were defeated in the first round by the American pairing of Mike Estep and Tony Giammalva.

At Venice in 1983, Mild had his only win on the Grand Prix circuit, which was over Guy Forget.

Mild was the coach of Anke Huber from 1998 to 2000.
