= Karen Smith (tennis) =

Former Australian tennis player

- Full name: Karen Stewart-Smith
- Country (sports): Australia
- Born: 19 October 1961 (age 64)
- Plays: Right-handed
- Prize money: $14,927

Grand Slam singles results
- Australian Open: Q1 (1982, 1983)
- US Open: Q1 (1984)

Karen Stewart-Smith (born 19 October 1961) is an Australian former professional tennis player.

== Biography ==
Smith, who is a niece of Roy Emerson, competed on the professional tour during the 1980s. In addition to featuring in WTA tournaments she also claimed the United States amateur clay court championship title in 1982.

A 2013 graduate of the University of Queensland, Smith is a now an exercise physiologist working in Brisbane.
