= John Stoddart (tennis) =

Australian tennis player (1962–2019)

- Full name: John Kenneth Stoddart
- Country (sports): Australia
- Born: 1962
- Died: 23 December 2019 (aged 57)

Singles
- Career record: 1–2
- Highest ranking: No. 339 (15 Oct 1984)

Grand Slam singles results
- Australian Open: 2R (1982)

Doubles
- Career record: 0–1
- Highest ranking: No. 384 (9 Jul 1984)

John Kenneth Stoddart (1962–2019) was an Australian professional tennis player.

Active on the professional tour in the 1980s, Stoddart had a best singles world ranking of 339. He qualified for the main draw of the 1982 Australian Open and was beaten in the second round by Pat Cash.
