= Hans Hansson (tennis) =

Australian tennis player

- Full name: Hans Henning Hansson
- Country (sports): Australia
- Born: Sydney, Australia

Singles
- Career record: 1–7
- Highest ranking: No. 382 (3 Jan 1983)

Grand Slam singles results
- Australian Open: 2R (1982)
- Wimbledon: Q3 (1981)

Doubles
- Career record: 2–6
- Highest ranking: No. 303 (3 Jan 1983)

Grand Slam doubles results
- Australian Open: 2R (1982)
- Wimbledon: Q2 (1981, 1983)

Hans Henning Hansson is an Australian former professional tennis player.

Born in Sydney, to a Swedish father and French mother, Hansson was an Australian Open junior semi-finalist and competed on the professional tour in the early 1980s. He featured in the men's singles main draw of the 1982 Australian Open and lost his second round match to the 10th seeded Tim Wilkison in five sets.
