= Wayne Hampson =

Australian tennis player

- Country (sports): Australia
- Born: 23 August 1957 (age 67); Monto, Queensland; Australia
- Height: 183 cm (6 ft 0 in)
- Plays: Right-handed

Singles
- Career record: 11–31
- Career titles: 0
- Highest ranking: No. 174 (4 January 1982)

Grand Slam singles results
- Australian Open: 2R (1982)
- Wimbledon: 1R (1980, 1983)

Doubles
- Career record: 33–57
- Career titles: 0
- Highest ranking: No. 109 (25 June 1984)

Grand Slam doubles results
- Australian Open: 3R (1982)
- French Open: 1R (1981, 1982, 1983, 1984)
- Wimbledon: 3R (1983)

Wayne Hampson (born 23 August 1957) is a former professional tennis player from Australia.

== Career ==
Hampson competed in the main singles draw of the Australian Open three times and Wimbledon twice, without managing to register a win. The closest he got was at the 1982 Australian Open, where he received a first round bye, before a five set loss in the second round to Eric Sherbeck, the last decided in a tiebreak. He had more success in the doubles, making the third round at the 1982 Australian Open (with Broderick Dyke) and the 1983 Wimbledon Championships (with Chris Johnstone).

He was a doubles finalist at the 1982 Melbourne Indoor tournament, the 1982 South Australian Open and the 1984 Lorraine Open, but lost them all. On the singles circuit, Hampson had his best performance in 1980, making a quarter-final appearance in Perth. He had a win over Kim Warwick at the Sydney Outdoor in 1981 and beat John Alexander en route to the round of 16 at Queen's in 1982.

== Grand Prix/WCT career finals ==
=== Doubles: 3 (0–3) ===
| Result | W/L | Date | Tournament | Surface | Partner | Opponents | Score |
|---|---|---|---|---|---|---|---|
| Loss | 0–1 | Dec 1982 | Adelaide, Australia | Grass | (Australia) Broderick Dyke | (Australia) Pat Cash (Australia) Chris Johnstone | 3–6, 7–6, 6–7 |
| Loss | 0–2 | Jan 1983 | Melbourne, Australia | Grass | (Australia) Broderick Dyke | (South Africa) Eddie Edwards (United Kingdom) Jonathan Smith | 6–7, 3–6 |
| Loss | 0–3 | Mar 1984 | Metz, France | Hard | (Australia) Wally Masur | (South Africa) Eddie Edwards (South Africa) Danie Visser | 6–3, 4–6, 2–6 |

== Challenger titles ==
=== Doubles: (2) ===
| No. | Year | Tournament | Surface | Partner | Opponents | Score |
|---|---|---|---|---|---|---|
| 1. | 1980 | Turin, Italy | Clay | (United States) Jai DiLouie | (United States) Dave Siegler (South Africa) Robbie Venter | 6–3, 6–4 |
| 2. | 1981 | Travemünde, West Germany | Clay | (Australia) Brad Guan | (New Zealand) Bruce Derlin (New Zealand) David Mustard | 6–3, 6–4 |
