= Mark Freedman =

American tennis player

- Country (sports): United States
- Born: November 19, 1958 (age 66) Larchmont, New York, U.S.

Singles
- Career record: 0–1
- Highest ranking: No. 390 (January 2, 1984)

Grand Slam singles results
- Australian Open: 2R (1982)

Doubles
- Career record: 0–3
- Highest ranking: No. 360 (January 3, 1983)

Grand Slam doubles results
- French Open: 1R (1982)

Grand Slam mixed doubles results
- French Open: 1R (1982)
- Wimbledon: 2R (1982)

Mark Freedman (born November 19, 1958) is an American former professional tennis player.

A native of New York, Freedman played collegiate tennis for the University of Michigan, then competed on the professional tour in the early 1980s.

Freedman qualified for the singles main draw of the 1982 Australian Open and after a first-round bye, fell to sixth seed Hank Pfister. As a doubles player he also featured in the main draws of the French Open and Wimbledon.
