= Craig Edwards (tennis) =

American professional tennis player

- Full name: Craig Edwards
- Country (sports): United States
- Born: May 19, 1955 (age 69); Los Angeles, California
- Plays: Right-handed

Singles
- Career record: 2–8
- Career titles: 0
- Highest ranking: No. 258 (3 January 1983)

Grand Slam singles results
- Australian Open: 1R (1982)
- US Open: 1R (1981)

Doubles
- Career record: 29–32
- Career titles: 1

Grand Slam doubles results
- Australian Open: SF (1980)
- French Open: 3R (1981)
- Wimbledon: 2R (1980, 1982)
- US Open: 1R (1981)

Craig Edwards (born May 19, 1955) is a former professional tennis player from the United States.

== Biography ==
Edwards, a relative late comer to tennis, changed his approach to the sport after attending a basketball camp run by John Wooden, which he attended to learn things that he could put towards his tennis. He was the No. 1 player at Ventura High School for two and a half years, then in 1974 began as a freshman at the University of Redlands. An All-American at Redlands in 1973-74 and 1974–75, he later went to Pepperdine University.

During the 1980s, Edwards competed professionally on the Grand Prix tennis circuit, primarily in doubles events. His regular partner was Eddie Edwards, a South African player of no relation, who played with him at Pepperdine. They won a Grand Prix title at Bournemouth in 1980 and were runners-up in a further two Grand Prix tournaments, at Adelaide and Stuttgart the following year. In Grand Slam competition, the pair made the semi-finals of the 1980 Australian Open and lost a match deciding tiebreak to top seeds Peter McNamara and Paul McNamee to miss out on a spot in the final. They earned seedings at subsequent Grand Slam tournaments, including the 1981 Wimbledon Championships. The pair performed well again at the 1981 Australian Open and were quarter-finalists. In singles, Edwards competed in the main draw at the 1981 US Open (first round loss to Roscoe Tanner) and 1982 Australian Open (first round loss to David Pate).

A family friend of the Bryan brothers, Edwards was a travelling coach for Bob and Mike Bryan in their early years on tour.

== Grand Prix career finals ==
=== Doubles: 3 (1–2) ===
Result	W-L	Date	Tournament	Surface	Partner	Opponents	Score
Win	1.	Sep 1980	Bournemouth, United Kingdom	Clay	(South Africa) Eddie Edwards	(United Kingdom) Andrew Jarrett (United Kingdom) Jonathan Smith	6–3, 6–7, 8–6
Loss	2.	Jan 1981	Adelaide, Australia	Grass	(South Africa) Eddie Edwards	(Australia) Colin Dibley (Australia) John James	3–6, 4–6
Loss	3.	Mar 1981	Stuttgart, West Germany	Hard	(South Africa) Eddie Edwards	(United Kingdom) Buster Mottram (United States) Nick Saviano	6–3, 1–6, 2–6

== Challenger titles ==
=== Doubles: (1) ===
No.	Year	Tournament	Surface	Partner	Opponents	Score
1.	1980	Brussels, Belgium	Clay	(South Africa) Eddie Edwards	(United States) Doug Adler (Australia) Chris Johnstone	6–1, 6–2
