= Matt McDonald =

American tennis player (born 1958)

- Full name: Matthew McDonald
- Country (sports): United States
- Born: August 11, 1958 (age 68) Charlotte, North Carolina, U.S.

Singles
- Career record: 1–4
- Highest ranking: No. 273 (Jan 4, 1982)

Grand Slam singles results
- Australian Open: Q3 (1982)

Doubles
- Career record: 1–4
- Highest ranking: No. 337 (Jan 2, 1984)

Matthew McDonald (born August 11, 1958) is an American former professional tennis player.

Born in Charlotte, North Carolina, McDonald won two ACC team championships with North Carolina State University and was an ITA All-American in 1980. He is a member of the North Carolina Tennis Hall of Fame.

During the early 1980s he competed in professional tennis, featuring in the main draw of four Grand Prix events. He had a win over Christophe Roger-Vasselin at the 1981 Monterrey WCT tournament and was competitive in a loss to top-10 player Vitas Gerulaitis in Memphis in 1982.
