= 1982 Australian Open – Women's singles =

Women's singles
- 1982 Australian Open

Final
- Champion: (United States) Chris Evert
- Runner-up: (United States) Martina Navratilova
- Score: 6–3, 2–6, 6–3

Details
- Draw: 56 (8 Q )
- Seeds: 16

Events
| Singles | men | women | | boys | girls |
| Doubles | men | women | mixed | boys | girls |
| WC Singles | men | women | quad |
| WC Doubles | men | women | quad |
| Legends | men | women | mixed |
- Australian Open

Chris Evert defeated defending champion Martina Navratilova in a rematch of the previous year's final, 6–3, 2–6, 6–3 to win the women's singles tennis title at the 1982 Australian Open. It was her first Australian Open title and 14th major singles title overall, completing the career Grand Slam.

== Seeds ==
The seeded players are listed below. Chris Evert is the champion; others show the round in which they were eliminated.

1. (United States) Martina Navratilova (final)
2. (United States) Chris Evert (champion)
3. (United States) Andrea Jaeger (semifinals)
4. (Australia) Wendy Turnbull (quarterfinals)
5. (United States) Pam Shriver (semifinals)
6. (Czechoslovakia) Hana Mandlíková (second round)
7. (United States) Barbara Potter (third round)
8. (Socialist Federal Republic of Yugoslavia) Mima Jaušovec (second round)
9. (United States) Billie Jean King (quarterfinals)
10. (United States) Anne Smith (quarterfinals)
11. (United States) Andrea Leand (second round)
12. (United States) Zina Garrison (first round)
13. (Australia) Evonne Cawley (second round)
14. (South Africa) Rosalyn Fairbank (third round)
15. (West Germany) Claudia Kohde-Kilsch (third round)
16. (Czechoslovakia) Helena Suková (first round)

== Draw ==
=== Key ===
- Q = Qualifier
- WC = Wild card
- LL = Lucky loser
- r = Retired

=== Finals ===
Quarterfinals
1 | (United States) Martina Navratilova | 6 | 6
10 | (United States) Anne Smith | 2 | 1
4 | (Australia) Wendy Turnbull | 7 | 3 | 3
5 | (United States) Pam Shriver | 6 | 6 | 6
(West Germany) Eva Pfaff | 5 | 1
3 | (United States) Andrea Jaeger | 7 | 6
9 | (United States) Billie Jean King | 2 | 2
2 | (United States) Chris Evert | 6 | 6

Semifinals
1 | (United States) Martina Navratilova | 6 | 6
5 | (United States) Pam Shriver | 2 | 4
3 | (United States) Andrea Jaeger | 1 | 0
2 | (United States) Chris Evert | 6 | 6

Finals
1 | (United States) Martina Navratilova | 3 | 6 | 3
2 | (United States) Chris Evert | 6 | 2 | 6

=== Earlier rounds ===
==== Section 1 ====
First round
(Czechoslovakia) I Budařová | 6 | 6
(United Kingdom) S Barker | 3 | 2
(United States) J Mundel | 6 | 6
Q | (United States) P Smith | 1 | 2
(United States) K Latham | 1 | 0
15 | (West Germany) C Kohde-Kilsch | 6 | 6
10 | (United States) A Smith | 3 | 6 | 6
(United States) L Antonoplis | 6 | 4 | 3
Q | (Bulgaria) M Maleeva | 6 | 6
Q | (United States) S Acker | 3 | 3
(United States) S Walsh | 6 | 1 | 6
(United States) B Norton | 3 | 6 | 3

Second round
1 | (United States) M Navratilova | 6 | 6
(Czechoslovakia) I Budařová | 1 | 2
(United States) J Mundel | 1 | 6
15 | (West Germany) C Kohde-Kilsch | 6 | 7
10 | (United States) A Smith | 6 | 6
Q | (Bulgaria) M Maleeva | 2 | 2
(United States) S Walsh | 6 | 6
8 | (Socialist Federal Republic of Yugoslavia) M Jaušovec | 4 | 2

Third round
1 | (United States) M Navratilova | 6 | 6
15 | (West Germany) C Kohde-Kilsch | 4 | 4
10 | (United States) A Smith | 6 | 6
(United States) S Walsh | 3 | 1

Quarterfinals
1 | (United States) M Navratilova | 6 | 6
10 | (United States) A Smith | 2 | 1

==== Section 2 ====
First round
(Australia) D Fromholtz | 7 | 6
Q | (Australia) A Tobin | 6 | 4
(United States) W White | 2 | 6 | 6
(United States) B Hallquist | 6 | 4 | 1
Q | (Switzerland) C Jolissaint | 6 | 4
14 | (South Africa) R Fairbank | 7 | 6
Q | (Czechoslovakia) R Tomanová | 7 | 6
(United States) A Kiyomura | 6 | 2
(United States) L Allen | 6 | 7
(United States) A White | 4 | 6
(Australia) E Sayers | 3 | 6
11 | (United States) A Leand | 6 | 7

Second round
4 | (Australia) W Turnbull | 6 | 6
(Australia) D Fromholtz | 2 | 0
(United States) W White | 3 | 1
14 | (South Africa) R Fairbank | 6 | 6
5 | (United States) P Shriver | 6 | 6
Q | (Czechoslovakia) R Tomanová | 1 | 1
(United States) L Allen | 6 | 6
11 | (United States) A Leand | 4 | 3

Third round
4 | (Australia) W Turnbull | 7 | 6
14 | (South Africa) R Fairbank | 6 | 4
5 | (United States) P Shriver | 6 | 3
(United States) L Allen | 3 | 0 | r

Quarterfinals
4 | (Australia) W Turnbull | 6 | 6 | 6
5 | (United States) P Shriver | 7 | 3 | 3

==== Section 3 ====
First round
12 | (United States) Z Garrison | 4 | 2
(United Kingdom) J Durie | 6 | 6
(France) C Vanier | 6 | 7
(United States) N Yeargin | 1 | 6
(West Germany) E Pfaff | 6 | 6
(United States) S Mascarin | 2 | 3
13 | (Australia) E Cawley | 3 | 6 | 6
(Brazil) C Monteiro | 6 | 3 | 4
(United States) C Reynolds | 3 | 6 | 6
(Australia) S Leo | 6 | 3 | 3
(United States) A Moulton | 6 | 6
(United States) C Benjamin | 4 | 0

Second round
(United Kingdom) J Durie | 6 | 6 | 6
(France) C Vanier | 2 | 7 | 1
(West Germany) E Pfaff | 3 | 6 | 6
6 | (Czechoslovakia) H Mandlíková | 6 | 2 | 0
13 | (Australia) E Cawley | 6 | 4 | 5
(United States) C Reynolds | 2 | 6 | 7
(United States) A Moulton | 4 | 4
3 | (United States) A Jaeger | 6 | 6

Third round
(United Kingdom) J Durie | 6 | 4 | 1
(West Germany) E Pfaff | 2 | 6 | 6
(United States) C Reynolds | 2 | 0
3 | (United States) A Jaeger | 6 | 6

Quarterfinals
(West Germany) E Pfaff | 5 | 1
3 | (United States) A Jaeger | 7 | 6

==== Section 4 ====
First round
(Netherlands) B Stöve | 6 | 7
(Netherlands) M Mesker | 4 | 6
(Switzerland) P Delhees | 2 | 6 | 7
(South Africa) Y Vermaak | 6 | 2 | 6
(United States) J Preyer | 3 | 6 | 2
9 | (United States) B J King | 6 | 4 | 6
16 | (Czechoslovakia) H Suková | 6 | 4 | 5
(Australia) A Minter | 3 | 6 | 7
(France) C Tanvier | 6 | 6
Q | (Australia) S Saliba | 2 | 1
Q | (Australia) C O'Neil | 6 | 6
(United States) V Nelson | 2 | 4

Second round
7 | (United States) B Potter | 7 | 6
(Netherlands) B Stöve | 5 | 3
(Switzerland) P Delhees | 1 | 6 | 5
9 | (United States) B J King | 6 | 4 | 7
(Australia) A Minter | 6 | 2 | 3
(France) C Tanvier | 2 | 6 | 6
Q | (Australia) C O'Neil | 1 | 1
2 | (United States) C Evert | 6 | 6

Third round
7 | (United States) B Potter | 4 | 2
9 | (United States) B J King | 6 | 6
(France) C Tanvier | 3 | 2
2 | (United States) C Evert | 6 | 6

Quarterfinals
9 | (United States) B J King | 2 | 2
2 | (United States) C Evert | 6 | 6

== See also ==
- Evert–Navratilova rivalry

| Preceded by 1982 US Open – Women's singles | Grand Slam women's singles | Succeeded by 1983 French Open – Women's singles |
