= Eduardo Oncins =

Brazilian tennis player

- Country (sports): Brazil
- Born: 10 December 1964 (age 60)
- Prize money: $10,631

Singles
- Career record: 0–5
- Highest ranking: No. 256 (6 August 1984)

Grand Slam singles results
- Australian Open: 1R (1983)
- French Open: 1R (1984)

Doubles
- Career record: 2–9
- Highest ranking: No. 230 (13 August 1984)

Grand Slam doubles results
- Australian Open: 2R (1982)

Grand Slam mixed doubles results
- French Open: 2R (1984)

Eduardo "Edu" Oncins (born 10 December 1964) is a Brazilian former professional tennis player.

== Biography ==
Oncins, who comes from São Paulo, represented Brazil in a Davis Cup tie against Ecuador in 1982.

During his career he twice qualified for the singles main draw of a grand slam tournament, at the 1983 Australian Open and 1984 French Open.

His younger brother, Jaime Oncins, played on the professional tour in the 1990s.

== See also ==
- List of Brazil Davis Cup team representatives
