= Wes Horskins =

Australian tennis player

- Full name: Wesley Horskins
- Country (sports): Australia

Singles
- Career record: 0–1
- Highest ranking: No. 434 (3 Jan 1983)

Grand Slam singles results
- Australian Open: 1R (1982)
- Wimbledon: Q1 (1983)

Doubles
- Career record: 0–1
- Highest ranking: No. 289 (2 Jan 1984)

Grand Slam doubles results
- Australian Open: 2R (1982)
- Wimbledon: Q2 (1983)

Wesley Horskins (born 1963) is an Australian former professional tennis player and tennis coach.

Horskins, an alumnus of Wesley College, Melbourne, was Victoria's top ranked junior in 1980. He twice reached the semi-finals of the Australian Junior Championships and won the Switzerland [Landquart] and Czechoslovak {Bratislava] Junior Championships. He competed on the ATP circuit for six years and went on to attend Oklahoma State University, where he competed in the NCAA First division. He relocated to Marbella, Spain where he lived and coached for two years before resettling back to Melbourne to form his own academy, Futures Tennis. Futures Tennis is the only academy to have won the Newcombe medals at the Australian Tennis Awards in three different categories: 2011 Hot Shots; 2012 Club Coach and 2015 Club/Centre. Wes is a Tennis Australia Master Club Professional and in 2022 was inducted into the Tennis Coaches Association of Victoria's Hall of Fame. In 2023 Wes was elected the President of Tennis Coaches Australia.

On the professional tour, Horskins had a main draw appearance at the 1982 Australian Open in singles and doubles and reached a best singles ATP world ranking of 398 and doubles 252. He had wins over former top 100 players John McCurdy and Brod Dyke in the Victorian Indoor Championships and featured in qualifying draws at the Wimbledon and French Open Championships. He went on to win the 35 and over Australian Vets Championship and reached the quarter-finals of the ITF World 35 and over Championships in Amsterdam 2000 whilst also representing Australia in the World Team Championships in 2000 and 2001.
