= Juan Farrow =

American tennis player and coach

- Born: January 18, 1958 (age 68); Lynchburg, Virginia
- Education: Southern Illinois University, Edwardsville
- Occupation: Tennis professional
- Era: Robert Walter Johnson & Richard Hudlin
- Notable work: Helping African-American youth succeed in tennis
- Spouse: Queen Shockley Farrow
- Awards: ITA Hall of Fame
- USA Rankings & Championships #1 in 12s & 14s, #3 in 16s, #6 in 18s Missouri state tennis singles champion 1974,1975,1976; NCAA Div.2 singles champion 1977,1978,1980
- Website: JuanFarrow

Juan Farrow is a prominent African-American tennis player and coach. He was launched in his tennis career by a neighbor in Lynchburg, Virginia, Dr. Robert Walter Johnson, who also mentored Arthur Ashe and Althea Gibson.

== Biography ==
At the age of four Juan Farrow began hitting tennis balls interminably against a wall with a broomstick, under the tutelage of his neighbor, Dr. Johnson. Since African-Americans were not allowed on the public courts in Virginia, Johnson sent Farrow, as he had Ashe, to Sumner High School in St. Louis to learn under the coaching of Richard Hudlin, a tennis star at the University of Chicago in the 1920s who helped break down racial barriers. Hudlin lived at the vacated St. Louis Armory while hosting the best young tennis players in the St. Louis area to hone their games on the 6 hardwood courts. Arthur Ashe and his friend Pancho Gonzales came to coach Farrow, who won Missouri state singles championships for Sumner High School in 1974, 1975, and 1976, and went on to star at Southern Illinois University Edwardsville (SIUE).

At SIUE, Farrow was an ITA All-American in Division II singles and doubles from 1977 to 1980 and an ITA Division I singles All-American in 1980, when he was a member of the U.S. under-21 Davis Cup Team. In 1979, Farrow was an NCAA Division I singles semifinalist. Behind Farrow and Arjun Fernando, the SIUE men's tennis team captured NCAA Division II Men's Tennis Championships in 1978, 1979, and 1980, while Farrow won the singles championships in 1977, 1978, and 1980. He won the National Public Parks Championship in 1977.

He turned pro after graduation and played in the Australian Open in 1982, but could not get the sponsorship he needed, and his world ranking never surpassed No. 260. Farrow taught, moved to Lincolnshire to work with the USTA National Junior Tennis Program, then to Griffith, Indiana, where he taught at the Match Point Racquet Club and Calumet High School. He then held a job for over 20 years as tennis pro in Macon, Georgia.

His coach Kent DeMars said of what Farrow did for the SIUE tennis program: “Juan's (presence) is what put our name on the map. We had an upstart program in Southern Illinois, and because we now had a feature player like Juan, I was able to go out and get similar type players."
