= Ken Barton (tennis) =

Australian tennis player

- Country (sports): Australia

Singles
- Career record: 1–4
- Highest ranking: No. 343 (3 Jan 1983)

Grand Slam singles results
- Australian Open: 1R (1982)
- Wimbledon: Q2 (1983)

Doubles
- Career record: 0–2
- Highest ranking: No. 437 (3 Jan 1983)

Grand Slam doubles results
- Australian Open: 2R (1982)
- Wimbledon: Q2 (1983)

Ken Barton is an Australian former professional tennis player.

Barton competed on the professional tour in the early 1980s, reaching a best world ranking of 343. In 1982 he had a win over Stan Smith at the Columbus Open and held a match point in his loss to world number 24 Hank Pfister at the Melbourne Outdoor. He qualified for the main draw of the 1982 Australian Open and lost his first round match to Peter Feigl in five sets.
