= 1982 Australian Open – Women's doubles =

Women's doubles
- 1982 Australian Open

Final
- Champions: (United States) Martina Navratilova (United States) Pam Shriver
- Runners-up: (West Germany) Claudia Kohde (West Germany) Eva Pfaff
- Score: 6–4, 6–2

Details
- Draw: 32
- Seeds: 8

Events
Singles	men	women		boys	girls
Doubles	men	women	mixed	boys	girls
WC Singles	men	women	quad
WC Doubles	men	women	quad
Legends	men	women	mixed
- Australian Open

Martina Navratilova and Pam Shriver defeated Claudia Kohde and Eva Pfaff in the final, 6–4, 6–2 to win the 1982 Australian Open. It was the first of seven consecutive titles for the team.

Kathy Jordan and Anne Smith were the defending champions but only Smith competed that year with Billie Jean King. King and Smith lost in the semifinals to Navratilova and Shriver.

== Seeds ==
Champion seeds are indicated in bold text while text in italics indicates the round in which those seeds were eliminated.

1. (United States) **Martina Navratilova** / (United States) **Pam Shriver (champions)**
2. (United States) Rosemary Casals / (Australia) Wendy Turnbull (quarterfinals)
3. (United States) Barbara Potter / (United States) Sharon Walsh (semifinals)
4. (United States) Billie Jean King / (United States) Anne Smith (semifinals)
5. (United Kingdom) Sue Barker / (United States) Ann Kiyomura (first round)
6. (United States) Leslie Allen / (Socialist Federal Republic of Yugoslavia) Mima Jaušovec (first round)
7. (United States) Candy Reynolds / (United States) Paula Smith (quarterfinals)
8. (West Germany) Claudia Kohde / (West Germany) Eva Pfaff (final)

== Draw ==
Key

- Q = Qualifier
- WC = Wild card
- LL = Lucky loser
- Alt = Alternate
- ITF = ITF entry
- PR = Protected ranking
- SR = Special ranking
- SE = Special exempt
- JE = Junior exempt
- JR = Junior Accelerator Programme entrant
- CO = College Accelerator Programme entrant
- NG = Next Gen Accelerator Program entrant
- w/o = Walkover
- r = Retired
- d = Defaulted

=== Final ===
Final
1	(United States) **Martina Navratilova** (United States) **Pam Shriver**	**6**	**6**
8	(West Germany) Claudia Kohde (West Germany) Eva Pfaff	4	2

=== Top half ===
First round
1	(United States) **M Navratilova** (United States) **P Shriver**	**6**	**6**
(United States) Z Garrison (United States) A Leand	3	2
(United States) S Acker (United States) B Hallquist	1	**6**	4
(United States) **L Antonoplis** (United States) **B Jordan**	**6**	4	**6**
(United States) J Preyer (United States) W White	**7**	6	4
(South Africa) **I Kloss** (Netherlands) **B Stöve**	5	**7**	**6**
(Australia) D Fromholtz (Australia) E Sayers	4	3
7	(United States) **C Reynolds** (United States) **P Smith**	**6**	**6**
4	(United States) **B J King** (United States) **A Smith**	**6**	**7**
(Australia) C O'Neil (Australia) P Whytcross	3	6
(New Zealand) C Newton (Australia) B Remilton	6	4
(Australia) **L Cassell** (Australia) **K Pratt**	**7**	**6**
(Switzerland) P Delhees (United States) A Moulton	**7**	6	2
(United Kingdom) **J Durie** (South Africa) **R Fairbank**	6	**7**	**6**
(Switzerland) **C Jolissaint** (Netherlands) **M Mesker**	4	**6**	**6**
6	(United States) L Allen (Socialist Federal Republic of Yugoslavia) M Jaušovec	**6**	2	4

Second round
1	(United States) **M Navratilova** (United States) **P Shriver**	**6**	**6**
(United States) L Antonoplis (United States) B Jordan	4	1
(South Africa) I Kloss (Netherlands) B Stöve	2	3
7	(United States) **C Reynolds** (United States) **P Smith**	**6**	**6**
4	(United States) **B J King** (United States) **A Smith**	**6**	**6**
(Australia) L Cassell (Australia) K Pratt	3	3
(United Kingdom) J Durie (South Africa) R Fairbank	3	3
(Switzerland) **C Jolissaint** (Netherlands) **M Mesker**	**6**	**6**

Quarterfinals
1	(United States) **M Navratilova** (United States) **P Shriver**	**6**	**6**
7	(United States) C Reynolds (United States) P Smith	2	4
4	(United States) **B J King** (United States) **A Smith**	**7**	2	**7**
(Switzerland) C Jolissaint (Netherlands) M Mesker	6	**6**	5

Semifinals
1	(United States) **M Navratilova** (United States) **P Shriver**	**6**	3	**6**
4	(United States) B J King (United States) A Smith	3	**6**	4

=== Bottom half ===
First round
5	(United Kingdom) S Barker (United States) A Kiyomura	4	4
(Australia) **S Leo** (Brazil) **C Monteiro**	**6**	**6**
(United States) **A M Fernandez** (United States) **B Norton**	**7**	**7**
(Czechoslovakia) I Budařová (Czechoslovakia) R Tomanová	6	5
(United States) S Mascarin (United States) A White	0	**6**	3
(South Africa) **Y Vermaak** (United States) **N Yeargin**	**6**	4	**6**
(Australia) A Minter (Australia) A Tobin	5	1
3	(United States) **B Potter** (United States) **S Walsh**	**7**	**6**
8	(West Germany) **C Kohde** (West Germany) **E Pfaff**	**6**	**6**
(United States) R Blount (United States) K Latham	2	4
(Czechoslovakia) **H Suková** (France) **C Tanvier**	**6**	**6**
(United States) K Sands (France) C Vanier	1	0
(United States) **C Evert-Lloyd** (United States) **A Jaeger**	6	**6**	**6**
(United Kingdom) A Brown (United States) H Ludloff	**7**	3	1
(South Africa) B Mould (South Africa) J Mundel	0	1
2	(United States) **R Casals** (Australia) **W Turnbull**	**6**	**6**

Second round
(Australia) S Leo (Brazil) C Monteiro	2	4
(United States) **A M Fernandez** (United States) **B Norton**	**6**	**6**
(South Africa) Y Vermaak (United States) N Yeargin	5	3
3	(United States) **B Potter** (United States) **S Walsh**	**7**	**6**
8	(West Germany) **C Kohde** (West Germany) **E Pfaff**	**7**	**6**
(Czechoslovakia) H Suková (France) C Tanvier	5	4
(United States) C Evert-Lloyd (United States) A Jaeger	2	1
2	(United States) **R Casals** (Australia) **W Turnbull**	**6**	**6**

Quarterfinals
(United States) A M Fernandez (United States) B Norton	3	4
3	(United States) **B Potter** (United States) **S Walsh**	**6**	**6**
8	(West Germany) **C Kohde** (West Germany) **E Pfaff**	5	**6**	**6**
2	(United States) R Casals (Australia) W Turnbull	**7**	3	2

Semifinals
3	(United States) B Potter (United States) S Walsh	**7**	5	6^{7}
8	(West Germany) **C Kohde** (West Germany) **E Pfaff**	5	**7**	**7^{9}**
