= Eric Sherbeck =

American tennis player

- Full name: Eric Sherbeck
- Country (sports): United States
- Born: August 7, 1957 (age 67); Missoula, Montana, U.S.

Singles
- Career record: 3–4
- Highest ranking: No. 273 (January 3, 1983)

Grand Slam singles results
- Australian Open: 3R (1982)

Doubles
- Career record: 18–37
- Career titles: 1
- Highest ranking: No. 116 (October 29, 1984)

Grand Slam doubles results
- Australian Open: 3R (1983)
- US Open: 1R (1982, 1983, 1984)

Eric Sherbeck (born August 7, 1957) is an American former professional tennis player.

== Biography ==
Sherbeck was born in Missoula, Montana, the son of Hal Sherbeck, an athletics coach at the University of Montana. Early in his childhood the family moved to California and his father began a famed career as the athletic director and football coach at Fullerton College. After graduating from El Dorado High School, Sherbeck went to Arizona State University, where he was the No. 1 singles player in the varsity tennis team. He graduated with a business administration degree in 1980, then turned to professional tennis.

Primarily as a doubles specialist, Sherbeck competed on the international tennis circuit until 1985. He did however appear in the main draw in the singles at the Australian Open on three occasions, with his performance in the 1982 Australian Open his best result, eliminated by eventual champion Johan Kriek in the third round. In doubles he also made the third round at the 1983 Australian Open with David Pate, a run which also ended at the hands of the tournament winners, Mark Edmondson and Paul McNamee. They came close to an upset win and quarter-final berth, only losing 6–8 in the final set. He won one Grand Prix doubles title, at the 1983 South Australian Open in Adelaide, with a local player Craig Miller.

In 1985 he took over from Buff Bogard coaching the men's Cal State Fullerton Titans Tennis team as head coach.

His elder brother, David Sherbeck, was also a tennis player who represented the University of Utah and later appeared at Wimbledon.

== Grand Prix career finals ==
=== Doubles: 1 (1–0) ===
Result	W-L	Date	Tournament	Surface	Partner	Opponents	Score
Win	1–0	Dec 1983	Adelaide, Australia	Grass	(Australia) Craig Miller	(Australia) Broderick Dyke (Australia) Rod Frawley	6–3, 4–6, 6–4

== Challenger titles ==
=== Doubles: (1) ===
No.	Year	Tournament	Surface	Partner	Opponents	Score
1.	1981	Guadalajara, Mexico	Clay	(United States) Glen Holroyd	(United States) Bruce Kleege (United States) Andy Kohlberg	6–7, 6–4, 7–6
