= John McCurdy (tennis) =

Australian tennis player

- Country (sports): Australia
- Born: 13 May 1960 (age 66) Yarrawonga, Australia
- Height: 6 ft 2 in (188 cm)
- Plays: Right-handed

Singles
- Career record: 6-17
- Career titles: 0
- Highest ranking: No. 86 (1 Aug 1983)

Grand Slam singles results
- Australian Open: 3R (1982)
- Wimbledon: 4R (1983)
- US Open: 1R (1983)

Doubles
- Career record: 12-26
- Career titles: 0
- Highest ranking: No. 169 (29 Oct 1984)

Grand Slam doubles results
- Australian Open: 3R (1982)
- French Open: 1R (1983)
- Wimbledon: 2R (1983)

John McCurdy (born 13 May 1960) is a former professional tennis player from Australia.

== Career ==
McCurdy made his first Grand Slam singles appearance at the 1982 Australian Open, where he had an opening round win over Sweden's Henrik Sundström, before being eliminated in the second round by John Sadri.

At the 1983 Wimbledon Championships, the Australian made it as far as the fourth round, with wins over Juan Avendaño, Claudio Panatta and Cássio Motta. He had only entered the main draw due to the withdrawal of American player Jay Turpin.

He lost in the first round of the 1983 US Open, to Eliot Teltscher.

McCurdy defeated John Frawley in the opening round of the 1983 Australian Open and was then beaten by Andy Andrews in the second round.

As a doubles player, he made the third round of the Australian Open in 1982, with Peter Johnston, whom he would partner at four further Grand Slam tournaments. McCurdy and Johnston were finalists at Melbourne's Black and Decker Indoor Championships in 1984.

In the early 1980s, McCurdy played at reserves level for the North Melbourne Football Club.

He became a tennis coach after retiring and spent a period of time as director of Tennis Victoria.

== Grand Prix/WCT career finals ==
=== Doubles: 1 (0–1) ===
Result	W/L	Date	Tournament	Surface	Partner	Opponents	Score
Loss	0–1	Oct 1984	Melbourne Indoor, Australia	Carpet (i)	(Australia) Peter Johnston	(Australia) Broderick Dyke (Australia) Wally Masur	2–6, 3–6

== Challenger titles ==
=== Doubles: (1) ===
No.	Year	Tournament	Surface	Partner	Opponents	Score
1.	1982	Sydney, Australia	Hard	(Australia) Peter Johnston	(United States) John Benson (Australia) Chris Johnstone	6–7, 7–6, 7–6
