= Warren Maher =

Australian tennis player

- Country (sports): Australia
- Born: 15 January 1957 (age 68); Kew, Victoria; Australia
- Plays: Right-handed

Singles
- Career record: 18–39
- Career titles: 0
- Highest ranking: No. 154 (26 Dec 1979)

Grand Slam singles results
- Australian Open: 3R (1979, 1982)
- French Open: 2R (1979)
- Wimbledon: 2R (1980)
- US Open: 1R (1980)

Doubles
- Career record: 24–51
- Career titles: 0
- Highest ranking: No. 165 (3 Jan 1983)

Grand Slam doubles results
- Australian Open: 3R (1982)
- French Open: 1R (1980)
- Wimbledon: 1R (1977, 1978, 1980)
- US Open: 2R (1980, 1982)

Warren Maher (born 15 January 1957) is a former professional tennis player from Australia. After leaving the professional tour, Warren was appointed Head Coach for Donvale Tennis Club (Donvale TC) in his native Melbourne in 1983. In the decade following, he discovered and coached a number of highly talented and successful junior players. Warren played No. 1 and captained Donvale's "A" grade state pennant team (now known as "State Grade") which won a number of titles. Team members included Noel Phillips, Ian Russell, Ron Woodbridge, Dean Ashton, Graeme Harris.

After a successful decade with Donvale TC, Warren and wife Kerry formed a business and took-over coaching and management of a large council-owned tennis facility known as Camberwell Tennis Centre (now Booroondara).

== Junior ==
Maher had a promising junior career, with the highlight coming at the 1975 Australian Open, where he and Glenn Busby won the boys' doubles title.

== Grand Slams ==
Maher made the third round of the 1979 Australian Open and in the opening round had a win over seventh seed Tim Wilkison. He had also beaten Wilkison in Adelaide two weeks before. In the second round, he defeated Shlomo Glickstein, 10–8 in the final set, before losing in the third round to Mark Edmondson. He also reached the third round of the 1982 Australian Open, beating Mike Barr and Tom Cain.

== Challenger titles ==
=== Doubles: (2) ===
No.	Year	Tournament	Surface	Partner	Opponents	Score
1.	1981	Royan, France	Clay	(Australia) Cliff Letcher	(Sweden) Anders Järryd (Sweden) Stefan Simonsson	7–5, 7–5
2.	1982	Cologne, West Germany	Clay	(Australia) Brad Guan	(Australia) Chris Johnstone (Australia) Cliff Letcher	6–2, 6–4
