= David Graham (tennis) =

Australian tennis player

- Country (sports): Australia
- Born: 4 August 1962 (age 62); Newcastle, New South Wales
- Height: 5 ft 11 in (180 cm)
- Plays: Right-handed
- Prize money: $78,580

Singles
- Career record: 1–2
- Highest ranking: No. 324 (3 January 1983)

Grand Slam singles results
- Australian Open: 1R (1982)

Doubles
- Career record: 100–126
- Career titles: 2
- Highest ranking: No. 46 (2 January 1984)

Grand Slam doubles results
- Australian Open: SF (1983)
- French Open: 3R (1983, 1984)
- Wimbledon: 3R (1986)
- US Open: 2R (1984, 1986)

David Graham (born 4 August 1962) is a former professional Australian tennis player.

Graham enjoyed most of his tennis success while playing doubles. During his career he won 2 doubles titles. He achieved a career-high doubles ranking of World No. 46 in 1984. He was known for his hard left-handed serve. He was sponsored by Adidas and Dunlop racquets.

== Career finals ==
=== Doubles (2 titles, 2 runner-ups) ===
Result	W-L	Date	Tournament	Surface	Partner	Opponents	Score
Loss	0–1	1983	Auckland, New Zealand	Hard	(Australia) Laurie Warder	(New Zealand) Chris Lewis (New Zealand) Russell Simpson	6–7, 3–6
Win	1–1	1984	Newport, U.S.	Grass	(Australia) Laurie Warder	(United States) Ken Flach (United States) Robert Seguso	6–4, 7–6
Win	2–1	1985	Florence, Italy	Clay	(Australia) Laurie Warder	(New Zealand) Bruce Derlin (Australia) Carl Limberger	6–1, 6–1
Loss	2–2	1985	Washington D.C., U.S.	Clay	(Hungary) Balázs Taróczy	(Chile) Hans Gildemeister (Paraguay) Víctor Pecci	3–6, 6–1, 4–6
