= Peter Johnston (tennis) =

Australian tennis player

- Country (sports): Australia
- Born: 1 June 1960 (age 66) Melbourne, Australia
- Height: 178 cm (5 ft 10 in)
- Turned pro: 1979
- Plays: Left-handed

Singles
- Career record: 2–15
- Career titles: 0
- Highest ranking: No. 226 (2 Jan 1984)

Grand Slam singles results
- Australian Open: 2R (1982)

Doubles
- Career record: 14–30
- Career titles: 0
- Highest ranking: No. 139 (18 Mar 1985)

Grand Slam doubles results
- Australian Open: 3R (1982)
- French Open: 1R (1981, 1982, 1983, 1984, 1985)
- Wimbledon: 2R (1983)

Peter Johnston (born 1 June 1960) is a former professional tennis player from Australia.

== Career ==
Johnston played collegiate tennis for Oklahoma State University.

He received a bye in the opening round of the 1982 Australian Open, then faced Ben Testerman in the second round, a match the Australian lost in straight sets. In the doubles he made the third round, with partner John McCurdy.

Johnston is believed to be one of the inspirations (alongside Stefan Edberg) for the Australian Open logo from 1995 to 2016, which depicted a male player serving.

He now works a managing director at the Women's Tennis Association.

== Grand Prix/WCT career finals ==
=== Doubles: 1 (0–1) ===
Result	W/L	Date	Tournament	Surface	Partner	Opponents	Score
Loss	0–1	Oct 1984	Melbourne Indoor, Australia	Carpet	(Australia) John McCurdy	(Australia) Broderick Dyke (Australia) Wally Masur	2–6, 3–6

== Challenger titles ==
=== Doubles: (1) ===
No.	Year	Tournament	Surface	Partner	Opponents	Score
1.	1982	Sydney, Australia	Hard	(Australia) John McCurdy	(United States) John Benson (Australia) Chris Johnstone	6–7, 7–6, 7–6
