= David Mustard (tennis) =

New Zealand tennis player

- Full name: David Mustard
- Country (sports): New Zealand
- Born: 29 December 1959 (age 65); Lower Hutt, New Zealand
- Plays: Left-handed
- Prize money: $74,934

Singles
- Career record: 13–36
- Career titles: 0
- Highest ranking: No. 121 (9 July 1984)

Grand Slam singles results
- Australian Open: 2R (1984, 1985)
- Wimbledon: 3R (1985)

Doubles
- Career record: 21–44
- Career titles: 0
- Highest ranking: No. 91 (29 July 1985)

Grand Slam doubles results
- Australian Open: 2R (1982, 1983)
- French Open: 3R (1985)
- Wimbledon: 3R (1982)
- US Open: 1R (1984)

David Mustard (born 29 December 1959) is a former professional tennis player from New Zealand.

== Biography ==
Mustard played professionally on the Grand Prix tennis circuit during the 1980s and won an ATP Challenger tournament in Sutton in 1984.

He twice made it past the first round of the Australian Open, mostly notably in 1984 when he gave eventual champion Mats Wilander a close contest in the second round, before losing in four sets. After winning the first set 6–1, Mustard was unable to repeat that performance in the second but had opportunities in the next two sets. He led Wilander 5–2 in the third set and 3–0 in the fourth, but the Swede was able to secure both sets and the match.

His best performance in a Grand Slam tournament came in the 1985 Wimbledon Championships when he made the third round, as a qualifier. He defeated Stuart Bale and Marc Flur, before being eliminated by Kevin Curren.

As a doubles player, he had some success with British player Jonathan Smith. The pair made the round of 16 at the 1985 French Open and won two Challenger titles. His other Challenger title in doubles came with Russell Simpson, with whom he made the semi-finals at a Cleveland Grand Prix tournament in 1984.

Mustard played in one Davis Cup tie for New Zealand, against Taiwan in Auckland in 1985, which the home side won 5-0. He defeated Hsu Huang-Jung in the first singles rubber and was also used in the doubles, with David Lewis.

He now works as a tennis coach in Herne Bay, Auckland.

== Challenger titles ==
=== Singles: (1) ===
No.	Year	Tournament	Surface	Opponent	Score
1.	1984	Sutton, UK	Clay	(United Kingdom) Steve Shaw	3–6, 6–4, 6–2

=== Doubles: (3) ===
No.	Year	Tournament	Surface	Partner	Opponents	Score
1.	1984	Tampere, Finland	Clay	(United Kingdom) Jonathan Smith	(Sweden) Ronnie Båthman (Italy) Luca Bottazzi	6–3, 6–4
2.	1985	Neu-Ulm, West Germany	Clay	(United Kingdom) Jonathan Smith	(West Germany) Tore Meinecke (West Germany) Ricki Osterthun	6–3, 4–6, 6–4
3.	1986	Nagoya, Japan	Hard	(New Zealand) Russell Simpson	(Australia) Shane Barr (United States) Scott McCain	7–5, 5–7, 6–4

== See also ==
- List of New Zealand Davis Cup team representatives
