= 1983 Australian Open =

- Date: 29 November – 11 December 1983
- Edition: 72nd
- Category: Grand Slam (ITF)
- Surface: Grass
- Location: Melbourne, Australia
- Venue: Kooyong Lawn Tennis Club

Champions

Men's singles
- (Sweden) Mats Wilander

Women's singles
- (United States) Martina Navratilova

Men's doubles
- (Australia) Mark Edmondson / (Australia) Paul McNamee

Women's doubles
- (United States) Martina Navratilova / (United States) Pam Shriver

Boys' singles
- (Sweden) Stefan Edberg

Girls' singles
- (United Kingdom) Amanda Brown

Boys' doubles
- (Australia) Jamie Harty / (Australia) Des Tyson

Girls' doubles
- (Australia) Bernadette Randall / (Australia) Kim Staunton
- Australian Open

The 1983 Australian Open was a tennis tournament played on grass courts at the Kooyong Lawn Tennis Club in Melbourne in Victoria in Australia. It was the 72nd edition of the Australian Open and was held from 29 November through 11 December 1983.

== Seniors ==
=== Men's singles ===
(Sweden) Mats Wilander defeated (Czechoslovakia) Ivan Lendl, 6–1, 6–4, 6–4

• It was Wilander's 2nd career Grand Slam singles title and his 1st title at the Australian Open.

=== Women's singles ===
(United States) Martina Navratilova defeated (United States) Kathy Jordan, 6–2, 7–6^{(7–5)}

• It was Navratilova's 8th career Grand Slam singles title and her 2nd title at the Australian Open.

=== Men's doubles ===
(Australia) Mark Edmondson / (Australia) Paul McNamee defeated (United States) Steve Denton / (United States) Sherwood Stewart 6–3, 7–6

- It was Edmondson's 4th career Grand Slam title and his 4th Australian Open title. It was McNamee's 4th and last career Grand Slam title and his 2nd Australian Open title.

=== Women's doubles ===
(United States) Martina Navratilova / (United States) Pam Shriver defeated (United Kingdom) Anne Hobbs / (Australia) Wendy Turnbull 6–4, 6–7, 6–2

- It was Navratilova's 23rd career Grand Slam title and her 5th Australian Open title. It was Shriver's 6th career Grand Slam title and her 2nd Australian Open title.

=== Mixed doubles ===
The competition was not held between 1970 and 1986.

== Juniors ==
=== Boys' singles ===
(Sweden) Stefan Edberg defeated (Australia) Simon Youl 6–4, 6–4

- With this victory Edberg completed the only junior Grand Slam in a calendar year in the Open Era to date. Butch Buchholz completed the same Grand Slam in 1958, but the US Open junior events were invitational at that time.

=== Girls' singles ===
(United Kingdom) Amanda Brown defeated (Australia) Bernadette Randall 7–6, 6–3

=== Boys' doubles ===
(Australia) Jamie Harty / (Australia) Des Tyson defeated (Australia) Darren Cahill / (Australia) Anthony Lane 3–6, 6–4, 6–3

=== Girls' doubles ===
(Australia) Bernadette Randall / (Australia) Kim Staunton defeated (Australia) Jenny Byrne / (Australia) Janine Thompson 3–6, 6–3, 6–3

== Notes ==
Preceded by 1983 US Open	Grand Slams	Succeeded by 1984 French Open
