= Andy Andrews (tennis) =

American tennis player (born 1959)

- Country (sports): United States
- Born: January 1, 1959 (age 67) Raleigh, North Carolina, US
- Height: 6 ft 1 in (185 cm)
- Plays: Right-handed

Singles
- Career record: 18–36
- Career titles: 0
- Highest ranking: No. 78 (May 17, 1982)

Grand Slam singles results
- Australian Open: 3R (1983)
- French Open: 1R (1983)
- Wimbledon: 2R (1982, 1983)
- US Open: 1R (1981, 1982, 1983)

Doubles
- Career record: 50–47
- Career titles: 3
- Highest ranking: No. 32 (February 28, 1983)

Grand Slam doubles results
- Australian Open: F (1982)
- Wimbledon: 1R (1982, 1983, 1984)
- US Open: SF (1983)

Andy Andrews (born January 1, 1959) is a former professional tennis player from the United States. He was born in Raleigh, North Carolina.

Andrews enjoyed most of his tennis success while playing doubles. During his career he won 3 doubles titles and finished runner-up at the 1982 Australian Open partnering John Sadri. He achieved a career-high doubles ranking of world No. 32 in February 1983.

Andrews career high singles ranking was world No. 78, which he reached in June 1982. He was a two-time All-American at North Carolina State University and was a two-time Atlantic Coast Conference doubles champion, partnering McDonald.

== Grand Prix, WCT, and Grand Slam finals ==
=== Doubles (3 titles, 3 runner-ups) ===
Result	W/L	Date	Tournament	Surface	Partner	Opponents	Score
Win	1–0	Jul 1982	Newport, U.S.	Grass	(United States) John Sadri	(Australia) Syd Ball (Australia) Rod Frawley	3–6, 7–6, 7–5
Win	2–0	Aug 1982	Cap d'Agde WCT, France	Clay	(United States) Drew Gitlin	(Czechoslovakia) Pavel Složil (Czechoslovakia) Tomáš Šmíd	6–2, 6–4
Win	3–0	Aug 1982	Stowe, U.S.	Hard	(United States) John Sadri	(United States) Mike Fishbach (United States) Eric Fromm	6–3, 6–4
Loss	3–1	Sep 1982	Los Angeles-2 WCT, U.S.	Carpet	(United States) Drew Gitlin	(South Africa) Kevin Curren (United States) Hank Pfister	6–4, 2–6, 5–7
Loss	3–2	Dec 1982	Australian Open, Melbourne	Grass	(United States) John Sadri	(Australia) John Alexander (Australia) John Fitzgerald	4–6, 6–7
Loss	3–3	Mar 1983	Monterrey, Mexico	Carpet	(United States) John Sadri	(United States) David Dowlen (Nigeria) Nduka Odizor	6–3, 3–6, 4–6
