= Bruce Derlin =

New Zealand tennis player

- Full name: Bruce Phillip Derlin
- Country (sports): New Zealand
- Born: 28 November 1961 (age 63); Sydney, Australia
- Height: 180 cm (5 ft 11 in)
- Plays: Left-handed
- Prize money: $208,630

Singles
- Career record: 32–65
- Highest ranking: No. 115 (10 December 1984)

Grand Slam singles results
- Australian Open: 3R (1984)
- French Open: 1R (1982, 1985)
- Wimbledon: 2R (1982)

Doubles
- Career record: 51–86
- Highest ranking: No. 83 (19 May 1986)

Grand Slam doubles results
- Australian Open: 3R (1989)
- French Open: 1R (1982, 83, 84, 86, 90)
- Wimbledon: 3R (1990)

Bruce Phillip Derlin (born 28 November 1961) is a retired tennis player from New Zealand.

Derlin represented his country at the 1988 Olympics in Seoul. There, the left-hander lost in the second round of the men's doubles competition to Australia's Darren Cahill and John Fitzgerald, while partnering Kelly Evernden.

== Challenger finals ==
=== Singles (1–2) ===
Result	No.	Date	Tournament	Surface	Opponent	Score
Win	1.	3 August 1981	Bara, Spain	Clay	(United Kingdom) Richard Lewis	7–6, 6–3
Loss	2.	10 September 1989	Genova, Italy	Clay	(Sweden) Magnus Larsson	1–6, 3–6
Loss	3.	5 November 1989	Beijing, China	Hard	(South Korea) Kim Bong-soo	4–6, 2–6
