= 1982 Australian Open =

- Date: 29 November – 13 December 1982
- Edition: 71st
- Category: Grand Slam (ITF)
- Surface: Grass
- Location: Melbourne, Australia
- Venue: Kooyong Lawn Tennis Club

Champions

Men's singles
- (United States) Johan Kriek

Women's singles
- (United States) Chris Evert-Lloyd

Men's doubles
- (Australia) John Alexander / (Australia) John Fitzgerald

Women's doubles
- (United States) Martina Navratilova / (United States) Pam Shriver

Boys' singles
- (Australia) Mark Kratzmann

Girls' singles
- (United Kingdom) Amanda Brown
- Australian Open

The 1982 Australian Open was a tennis tournament played on grass courts at the Kooyong Lawn Tennis Club in Melbourne in Victoria in Australia. It was the 71st edition of the Australian Open and was held from Monday 29 November through Monday 13 December 1982.

== Seniors ==
=== Men's singles ===
(United States) Johan Kriek defeated (United States) Steve Denton 6–3, 6–3, 6–2

- It was Kriek's 2nd and last career Grand Slam title and his 2nd consecutive Australian Open title.

=== Women's singles ===
(United States) Chris Evert defeated (United States) Martina Navratilova 6–3, 2–6, 6–3

- It was Evert-Lloyd's 13th major title and her 1st Australian Open title.

=== Men's doubles ===
(Australia) John Alexander / (Australia) John Fitzgerald defeated (United States) Andy Andrews / (United States) John Sadri 6–4, 7–6

- It was Alexander's 2nd and last career Grand Slam title and his 2nd Australian Open title. It was Fitzgerald's 1st career Grand Slam title and his only Australian Open title.

=== Women's doubles ===
(United States) Martina Navratilova / (United States) Pam Shriver defeated (West Germany) Claudia Kohde / (West Germany) Eva Pfaff 6–4, 6–2

- It was Navratilova's 17th career Grand Slam title and her 3rd Australian Open title. It was Shriver's 3rd career Grand Slam title and her 1st Australian Open title.

=== Mixed doubles ===
The competition was not held between 1970 and 1986.

== Juniors ==
=== Boys' singles ===
(Australia) Mark Kratzmann defeated (Australia) Simon Youl 6–3, 7–5

=== Girls' singles ===
(United Kingdom) Amanda Brown defeated (France) Pascale Paradis 6–3, 6–4

== Prize money ==
| Event | | W | F | SF | QF | 4R | 3R | 2R | 1R |
| Singles | Men | $72,000 | $36,000 | $18,00 | $9,000 | $5,500 | $3,100 | $1,800 | $900 |
| Singles | Women | $40,000 | $22,000 | $13,437 | $7,200 | – | $4,100 | $2,400 | $1,300 |

Total prize money for the men's events was $450,000. Total prize money for the women's events was $350,000.

| Preceded by 1982 US Open | Grand Slams | Succeeded by 1983 French Open |
