= 1983 ATP Challenger Series =

Details
- Duration: 3 January 1983 – 27 November 1983
- Edition: 6th
- Tournaments: 35

Achievements (singles)

The ATP Challenger Series is the second-tier tour for professional tennis organised by the Association of Tennis Professionals (ATP). The 1983 ATP Challenger Series calendar comprises 35 tournaments, with prize money ranging from $25,000 up to $75,000.

== Schedule ==
=== January ===
Week of	Tournament	Champions	Runners-up	Semifinalists	Quarterfinalists
January 3	Perth Challenger (Australia) Perth, Australia; Grass – $25,000 – 64S/32D; Singles draw – Doubles draw	(Australia) Wally Masur; 6–2, 4–6, 7–6	(United States) Juan Farrow	(South Africa) Eddie Edwards (United States) Dave Siegler	(Australia) Ken Barton (Australia) Wayne Hampson (Australia) Peter Johnston (Australia) Broderick Dyke
January 3	Perth Challenger (Australia) Perth, Australia; Grass – $25,000 – 64S/32D; Singles draw – Doubles draw	(United States) John Benson (Australia) Chris Johnstone; 3–6, 6–4, 7–6	(Australia) Peter Doohan (Australia) Michael Fancutt	(South Africa) Eddie Edwards (United States) Dave Siegler	(Australia) Ken Barton (Australia) Wayne Hampson (Australia) Peter Johnston (Australia) Broderick Dyke
January 10	No tournaments scheduled.				
January 17	No tournaments scheduled.				
January 24	No tournaments scheduled.				
January 31	No tournaments scheduled.				

=== February ===
Week of	Tournament	Champions	Runners-up	Semifinalists	Quarterfinalists
February 7	Nairobi Challenger (Kenya) Nairobi, Kenya; Clay – $25,000 – 32S/16D; Singles draw – Doubles draw	(Netherlands) Michiel Schapers; 6–3, 6–4	(United States) John Austin	(Austria) Hans-Peter Kandler (Austria) Gerald Mild	(United States) Phil Lehnhoff (Mexico) Juan Hernández (Austria) Bernhard Pils (Peru) Fernando Maynetto
February 7	Nairobi Challenger (Kenya) Nairobi, Kenya; Clay – $25,000 – 32S/16D; Singles draw – Doubles draw	(United States) John Austin (United States) Larry Stefanki; 6–2, 6–3	(United States) Phil Lehnhoff (United States) Mark Wagner	(Austria) Hans-Peter Kandler (Austria) Gerald Mild	(United States) Phil Lehnhoff (Mexico) Juan Hernández (Austria) Bernhard Pils (Peru) Fernando Maynetto
February 14	Ogun Challenger (Nigeria) Ogun, Nigeria; Hard – $25,000 – 32S/16D; Singles draw – Doubles draw	(United States) Larry Stefanki; 5–7, 6–3, 8–6	(United States) Mike Barr	(Finland) Leo Palin (India) Sashi Menon	(United States) Leif Shiras (Austria) Helmar Stiegler (Austria) Gerald Mild (Austria) Bernhard Pils
February 14	Ogun Challenger (Nigeria) Ogun, Nigeria; Hard – $25,000 – 32S/16D; Singles draw – Doubles draw	(United Kingdom) Robin Drysdale (Zimbabwe) Haroon Ismail; 4–6, 7–6, 9–7	(Austria) Hans-Peter Kandler (Austria) Gerald Mild	(Finland) Leo Palin (India) Sashi Menon	(United States) Leif Shiras (Austria) Helmar Stiegler (Austria) Gerald Mild (Austria) Bernhard Pils
February 21	Kuwait City Challenger; Kuwait City, Kuwait; Hard – $75,000 – 32S/16D; Singles draw – Doubles draw	(United States) Vitas Gerulaitis; 7–6, 4–6, 6–3	(Switzerland) Heinz Günthardt	(Sweden) Magnus Tideman (Czechoslovakia) Stanislav Birner	(West Germany) Michael Westphal (Hungary) Zoltán Kuhárszky (Australia) Rod Frawley (Czechoslovakia) Libor Pimek
February 21	Kuwait City Challenger; Kuwait City, Kuwait; Hard – $75,000 – 32S/16D; Singles draw – Doubles draw	(India) Vijay Amritraj (Romania) Ilie Năstase; 6–3, 3–6, 6–2	(Australia) Broderick Dyke (Australia) Rod Frawley	(Sweden) Magnus Tideman (Czechoslovakia) Stanislav Birner	(West Germany) Michael Westphal (Hungary) Zoltán Kuhárszky (Australia) Rod Frawley (Czechoslovakia) Libor Pimek
February 21	Lagos Open (Nigeria) Lagos, Nigeria; Hard – $75,000 – 32S/16D; Singles draw – Doubles draw	(United States) Craig Wittus; 6-3, 4–6, 11-9	(Netherlands) Michiel Schapers	(Austria) Hans-Peter Kandler (United States) Jonathan Canter	(United Kingdom) Colin Dowdeswell (United States) Rick Fagel (Austria) Bernhard Pils (United States) Leif Shiras
February 21	Lagos Open (Nigeria) Lagos, Nigeria; Hard – $75,000 – 32S/16D; Singles draw – Doubles draw	(United States) Wesley Cash (United States) John Mattke; 6–3, 3–6, 6–3	(United States) Jonathan Canter (United States) Joe Meyers	(Austria) Hans-Peter Kandler (United States) Jonathan Canter	(United Kingdom) Colin Dowdeswell (United States) Rick Fagel (Austria) Bernhard Pils (United States) Leif Shiras
February 28	Palm Hills International Tennis Challenger (Egypt) Cairo, Egypt; Clay – $75,000 – 32S/16D; Singles draw – Doubles draw	(Sweden) Henrik Sundström; 6–7, 6–2, 6–0	(Spain) Juan Avendaño	(Spain) Fernando Luna (Italy) Gianluca Rinaldini	(Australia) Brad Drewett (Spain) Ángel Giménez (Sweden) Stefan Simonsson (Spain) Sergio Casal
February 28	Palm Hills International Tennis Challenger (Egypt) Cairo, Egypt; Clay – $75,000 – 32S/16D; Singles draw – Doubles draw	(Australia) Broderick Dyke (Australia) Rod Frawley; 6–3, 6–2	(Australia) Brad Drewett (United Kingdom) John Feaver	(Spain) Fernando Luna (Italy) Gianluca Rinaldini	(Australia) Brad Drewett (Spain) Ángel Giménez (Sweden) Stefan Simonsson (Spain) Sergio Casal
February 28	Kaduna Challenger (Nigeria) Kaduna, Nigeria; Clay – $25,000 – 32S/16D; Singles draw – Doubles draw	(France) Patrice Kuchna; 7–5, 6–4	(Austria) Hans-Peter Kandler	(Netherlands) Huub van Boeckel (United States) Joe Meyers	(United States) Mike Barr (France) Thierry Pham (Sweden) Ola Hellgren (Austria) Bernhard Pils
February 28	Kaduna Challenger (Nigeria) Kaduna, Nigeria; Clay – $25,000 – 32S/16D; Singles draw – Doubles draw	(United States) Mike Barr (Switzerland) Jakob Hlasek; 6–4, 6–1	(Austria) Bernhard Pils (Austria) Helmar Stiegler	(Netherlands) Huub van Boeckel (United States) Joe Meyers	(United States) Mike Barr (France) Thierry Pham (Sweden) Ola Hellgren (Austria) Bernhard Pils

=== March ===
Week of	Tournament	Champions	Runners-up	Semifinalists	Quarterfinalists
March 7	Tunis Challenger (Tunisia) Tunis, Tunisia; Clay – $50,000 – 32S/16D; Singles draw – Doubles draw	(Sweden) Henrik Sundström; 6–3, 6–4, 6–2	(France) Thierry Tulasne	(Sweden) Magnus Tideman (Spain) Fernando Luna	(Spain) Manuel Orantes (Spain) Juan Aguilera (Spain) Sergio Casal (West Germany) Peter Elter
March 7	Tunis Challenger (Tunisia) Tunis, Tunisia; Clay – $50,000 – 32S/16D; Singles draw – Doubles draw	(Sweden) Per Hjertquist (France) Gilles Moretton; 6–4, 6–3	(United States) Peter Herrmann (West Germany) Damir Keretić	(Sweden) Magnus Tideman (Spain) Fernando Luna	(Spain) Manuel Orantes (Spain) Juan Aguilera (Spain) Sergio Casal (West Germany) Peter Elter
March 14	No tournaments scheduled.				
March 21	No tournaments scheduled.				
March 28	São Paulo Challenger (Brazil) São Paulo, Brazil; Clay – $50,000 – 32S/16D; Singles draw – Doubles draw	(Hungary) Zoltán Kuhárszky; 6–4, 4–6, 6–1	(Paraguay) Víctor Pecci	(United States) Tony Giammalva (Brazil) Carlos Kirmayr	(United States) Trey Waltke (Brazil) João Soares (Puerto Rico) Ernie Fernández (United States) Steve Meister
March 28	São Paulo Challenger (Brazil) São Paulo, Brazil; Clay – $50,000 – 32S/16D; Singles draw – Doubles draw	(Hungary) Zoltán Kuhárszky (Brazil) Gabriel Mattos; 6–2, 3–6, 6–3	(Paraguay) Víctor Pecci (Uruguay) Hugo Roverano	(United States) Tony Giammalva (Brazil) Carlos Kirmayr	(United States) Trey Waltke (Brazil) João Soares (Puerto Rico) Ernie Fernández (United States) Steve Meister

=== April ===
Week of	Tournament	Champions	Runners-up	Semifinalists	Quarterfinalists
April 4	Curitiba Challenger (Brazil) Curitiba, Brazil; Hard – $50,000 – 32S/16D; Singles draw – Doubles draw	(Hungary) Zoltán Kuhárszky; 6–2, 7–6	(Brazil) Júlio Góes	(Brazil) Edvaldo Oliveira (Chile) Pedro Rebolledo	(Argentina) Eduardo Bengoechea (United States) Steve Meister (Brazil) Thomaz Koch (United States) Pender Murphy
April 4	Curitiba Challenger (Brazil) Curitiba, Brazil; Hard – $50,000 – 32S/16D; Singles draw – Doubles draw	(Australia) David Carter (United States) Steve Meister; 6–3, 6–3	(Brazil) Givaldo Barbosa (Brazil) João Soares	(Brazil) Edvaldo Oliveira (Chile) Pedro Rebolledo	(Argentina) Eduardo Bengoechea (United States) Steve Meister (Brazil) Thomaz Koch (United States) Pender Murphy
April 4	Johannesburg Challenger (South Africa) Johannesburg, South Africa; Hard – $25,000 – 64S/32D; Singles draw – Doubles draw	(United States) John Austin; 1–6, 6–3, 6–2	(United States) Robert Van't Hof	(South Africa) Mike Myburg (South Africa) Christo van Rensburg	(South Africa) Denys Maasdorp (South Africa) Danie Visser (Israel) David Schneider (United States) Richard Meyer
April 4	Johannesburg Challenger (South Africa) Johannesburg, South Africa; Hard – $25,000 – 64S/32D; Singles draw – Doubles draw	(United States) Richard Meyer (South Africa) Frew McMillan; 6–4, 6–4	(South Africa) Eddie Edwards (South Africa) Raymond Moore	(South Africa) Mike Myburg (South Africa) Christo van Rensburg	(South Africa) Denys Maasdorp (South Africa) Danie Visser (Israel) David Schneider (United States) Richard Meyer
April 11	Ashkelon Challenger (Israel) Ashkelon, Israel; Hard – $25,000 – 32S/16D; Singles draw – Doubles draw	(Israel) Shlomo Glickstein; 6–3, 6–3	(Israel) Amos Mansdorf	(Israel) David Schneider (Austria) Robert Reininger	(United Kingdom) Colin Dowdeswell (Sweden) Per-Ola Lindquist (Austria) Peter Feigl (Netherlands) Huub van Boeckel
April 11	Ashkelon Challenger (Israel) Ashkelon, Israel; Hard – $25,000 – 32S/16D; Singles draw – Doubles draw	(Sweden) Stefan Svensson (Netherlands) Huub van Boeckel; 6–4, 4–6, 6–3	(United States) Rodney Crowley (United States) Rand Evett	(Israel) David Schneider (Austria) Robert Reininger	(United Kingdom) Colin Dowdeswell (Sweden) Per-Ola Lindquist (Austria) Peter Feigl (Netherlands) Huub van Boeckel
April 18	Hypo Group Tennis International (Italy) Bari, Italy; Clay – $25,000 – 32S/16D; Singles draw – Doubles draw	(Italy) Corrado Barazzutti; 6–0, 6–1	(Argentina) Carlos Castellan	(Spain) Juan Aguilera (New Zealand) Bruce Derlin	(Chile) Alejandro Pierola (West Germany) Eric Jelen (Argentina) Martín Jaite (Italy) Francesco Cancellotti
April 18	Hypo Group Tennis International (Italy) Bari, Italy; Clay – $25,000 – 32S/16D; Singles draw – Doubles draw	(Italy) Luca Bottazzi (Italy) Simone Colombo; 6–2, 3–6, 6–3	(Italy) Mario Calautti (New Zealand) Bruce Derlin	(Spain) Juan Aguilera (New Zealand) Bruce Derlin	(Chile) Alejandro Pierola (West Germany) Eric Jelen (Argentina) Martín Jaite (Italy) Francesco Cancellotti
April 18	Tokyo Challenger (Japan) Tokyo, Japan; Hard – $25,000 – 32S/16D; Singles draw – Doubles draw	(Japan) Tsuyoshi Fukui; 6–4, 6–0	(United Kingdom) Michael Wayman	(United States) Jeff Turpin (Australia) Peter Johnston	(United States) Joel Bailey (Australia) John Frawley (Australia) Simon Youl (Finland) Leo Palin
April 18	Tokyo Challenger (Japan) Tokyo, Japan; Hard – $25,000 – 32S/16D; Singles draw – Doubles draw	(United States) Charles Strode (United States) Morris Strode; 6–3, 6–4	(United States) David Dowlen (United States) Jeff Turpin	(United States) Jeff Turpin (Australia) Peter Johnston	(United States) Joel Bailey (Australia) John Frawley (Australia) Simon Youl (Finland) Leo Palin
April 25	Galatina Challenger (Italy) Galatina, Italy; Clay – $25,000 – 32S/16D; Singles draw – Doubles draw	(Italy) Francesco Cancellotti; 7–6, 6–1	(Spain) Miguel Mir	(Switzerland) Roland Stadler (Spain) Juan Aguilera	(United States) Jimmy Brown (Iran) Mansour Bahrami (Spain) Emilio Sánchez (United States) Bruce Foxworth
April 25	Galatina Challenger (Italy) Galatina, Italy; Clay – $25,000 – 32S/16D; Singles draw – Doubles draw	(New Zealand) Bruce Derlin (Netherlands) Huub van Boeckel; 6–2, 7–5	(Chile) Iván Camus (Switzerland) Ivan Dupasquier	(Switzerland) Roland Stadler (Spain) Juan Aguilera	(United States) Jimmy Brown (Iran) Mansour Bahrami (Spain) Emilio Sánchez (United States) Bruce Foxworth
April 25	Nagoya Challenger (Japan) Nagoya, Japan; Hard – $25,000 – 32S/16D; Singles draw – Doubles draw	(Finland) Leo Palin; 6–4, 6–2	(United States) Joel Bailey	(United States) Morris Strode (Australia) Greg Whitecross	(United States) Jeff Turpin (Japan) Shinichi Sakamoto (United States) Leif Shiras (United States) Charles Strode
April 25	Nagoya Challenger (Japan) Nagoya, Japan; Hard – $25,000 – 32S/16D; Singles draw – Doubles draw	(United States) Joel Bailey (United States) Jeff Turpin; 6–4, 3–6, 7–6	(United States) Charles Strode (United States) Morris Strode	(United States) Morris Strode (Australia) Greg Whitecross	(United States) Jeff Turpin (Japan) Shinichi Sakamoto (United States) Leif Shiras (United States) Charles Strode

=== May ===
Week of	Tournament	Champions	Runners-up	Semifinalists	Quarterfinalists
May 2	Parioli Challenger (Italy) Parioli, Italy; Clay – $25,000 – 32S/16D; Singles draw – Doubles draw	(United States) Jimmy Brown; 6–1, 6–2	(Italy) Corrado Barazzutti	(Spain) Sergio Casal (Sweden) Stefan Simonsson	(United States) Bruce Foxworth (Italy) Francesco Cancellotti (Argentina) Ricardo Cano (West Germany) Ulrich Pinner
May 2	Parioli Challenger (Italy) Parioli, Italy; Clay – $25,000 – 32S/16D; Singles draw – Doubles draw	(Brazil) Givaldo Barbosa (Brazil) Ney Keller; 6–3, 6–2	(Italy) Gianni Marchetti (Italy) Enzo Vattuone	(Spain) Sergio Casal (Sweden) Stefan Simonsson	(United States) Bruce Foxworth (Italy) Francesco Cancellotti (Argentina) Ricardo Cano (West Germany) Ulrich Pinner
May 2	Solihull Challenger (United Kingdom) Solihull, Great Britain; Clay – $25,000 – 32S/16D; Singles draw – Doubles draw	(South Africa) Robbie Venter; 6–4, 3–6, 6–3	(Australia) Broderick Dyke	(United States) Egan Adams (Australia) John McCurdy	(United Kingdom) Jonathan Smith (Spain) Gabriel Urpí (Israel) Steve Krulevitz (United Kingdom) Andrew Jarrett
May 2	Solihull Challenger (United Kingdom) Solihull, Great Britain; Clay – $25,000 – 32S/16D; Singles draw – Doubles draw	(United Kingdom) Andrew Jarrett (United Kingdom) Jonathan Smith; 6–2, 4–6, 6–4	(South Africa) Raymond Moore (Israel) David Schneider	(United States) Egan Adams (Australia) John McCurdy	(United Kingdom) Jonathan Smith (Spain) Gabriel Urpí (Israel) Steve Krulevitz (United Kingdom) Andrew Jarrett
May 9	Lee-on-Solent Challenger (United Kingdom) Lee-on-Solent, Great Britain; Clay – $25,000 – 32S/16D; Singles draw – Doubles draw	(South Africa) Robbie Venter; 6–3, 6–1	(United Kingdom) Jeremy Bates	(United States) Scott Lipton (Israel) David Schneider	(United States) Bruce Foxworth (Australia) Syd Ball (United Kingdom) Jonathan Smith (United Kingdom) Nick Brown
May 9	Lee-on-Solent Challenger (United Kingdom) Lee-on-Solent, Great Britain; Clay – $25,000 – 32S/16D; Singles draw – Doubles draw	(Australia) Charlie Fancutt (Australia) Greg Whitecross; 6–3, 3–6, 6–4	(United Kingdom) Andrew Jarrett (United Kingdom) Jonathan Smith	(United States) Scott Lipton (Israel) David Schneider	(United States) Bruce Foxworth (Australia) Syd Ball (United Kingdom) Jonathan Smith (United Kingdom) Nick Brown
May 16	Spring Open (United States) Spring, USA; Hard (i) – $25,000 – 32S/16D; Singles draw – Doubles draw	(United States) Leif Shiras; 6–1, 6–0	(Australia) Ross Case	(United States) Sean Brawley (United States) Lloyd Bourne	(United States) Butch Walts (United States) David Dowlen (United States) Juan Farrow (United States) Andy Kohlberg
May 16	Spring Open (United States) Spring, USA; Hard (i) – $25,000 – 32S/16D; Singles draw – Doubles draw	(Zimbabwe) Andrew Pattison (United States) Butch Walts; 7–6, 6–7, 6–4	(India) Anand Amritraj (United States) Lloyd Bourne	(United States) Sean Brawley (United States) Lloyd Bourne	(United States) Butch Walts (United States) David Dowlen (United States) Juan Farrow (United States) Andy Kohlberg
May 23	No tournaments scheduled.				
May 30	Tampere Open (Finland) Tampere, Finland; Clay – $25,000 – 32S/16D; Singles draw – Doubles draw	(Socialist Federal Republic of Yugoslavia) Marko Ostoja; 6–4, 6–2	(United States) Scott Lipton	(United States) Pender Murphy (United States) Jim Gurfein	(Sweden) Peter Svensson (West Germany) Eric Jelen (New Zealand) Bruce Derlin (Sweden) Jörgen Windahl
May 30	Tampere Open (Finland) Tampere, Finland; Clay – $25,000 – 32S/16D; Singles draw – Doubles draw	(Denmark) Peter Bastiansen (Denmark) Michael Mortensen; 6–4, 6–1	(United States) Mike Barr (Socialist Federal Republic of Yugoslavia) Marko Ostoja	(United States) Pender Murphy (United States) Jim Gurfein	(Sweden) Peter Svensson (West Germany) Eric Jelen (New Zealand) Bruce Derlin (Sweden) Jörgen Windahl

=== June ===
Week of	Tournament	Champions	Runners-up	Semifinalists	Quarterfinalists
June 6	Dortmund Challenger (West Germany) Dortmund, West Germany; Clay – $25,000 – 48S/24D; Singles draw – Doubles draw	(West Germany) Hans-Dieter Beutel; 6–7, 6–3, 6–4	(France) Jérôme Vanier	(United States) Jim Gurfein (West Germany) Hans Schwaier	(Italy) Luca Bottazzi (France) Christophe Freyss (Ecuador) Ricardo Ycaza (Argentina) Gustavo Guerrero
June 6	Dortmund Challenger (West Germany) Dortmund, West Germany; Clay – $25,000 – 48S/24D; Singles draw – Doubles draw	(United Kingdom) Colin Dowdeswell (United Kingdom) Andrew Jarrett; 6–7, 6–4, 6–3	(New Zealand) Bruce Derlin (West Germany) Karl Meiler	(United States) Jim Gurfein (West Germany) Hans Schwaier	(Italy) Luca Bottazzi (France) Christophe Freyss (Ecuador) Ricardo Ycaza (Argentina) Gustavo Guerrero
June 13	Brescia Challenger (Italy) Brescia, Italy; Clay – $25,000 – 32S/16D; Singles draw – Doubles draw	(Switzerland) Roland Stadler; 6–3, 6–1	(Paraguay) Víctor Pecci	(Italy) Simone Colombo (Brazil) Ivan Kley	(Austria) Helmar Stiegler (Italy) Francesco Cancellotti (Spain) Fernando Soler (Italy) Paolo Canè
June 13	Brescia Challenger (Italy) Brescia, Italy; Clay – $25,000 – 32S/16D; Singles draw – Doubles draw	(Chile) Iván Camus (Ecuador) Raúl Viver; 6–2, 5–7, 6–4	(Brazil) Dácio Campos (Brazil) Eduardo Oncins	(Italy) Simone Colombo (Brazil) Ivan Kley	(Austria) Helmar Stiegler (Italy) Francesco Cancellotti (Spain) Fernando Soler (Italy) Paolo Canè
June 20	No tournaments scheduled.				
June 27	Travemünde Challenger (West Germany) Travemünde, West Germany; Clay – $25,000 – 64S/32D; Singles draw – Doubles draw	(West Germany) Michael Westphal; 7–5, 6–2	(West Germany) Rolf Gehring	(Italy) Simone Colombo (Ecuador) Raúl Viver	(Spain) Eduardo Osta (Switzerland) Jakob Hlasek (Argentina) Eduardo Bengoechea (West Germany) Ulrich Pinner
June 27	Travemünde Challenger (West Germany) Travemünde, West Germany; Clay – $25,000 – 64S/32D; Singles draw – Doubles draw	(South Africa) Mike Myburg (South Africa) Christo van Rensburg; 7–5, 6–3	(West Germany) Harald Theissen (West Germany) Michael Westphal	(Italy) Simone Colombo (Ecuador) Raúl Viver	(Spain) Eduardo Osta (Switzerland) Jakob Hlasek (Argentina) Eduardo Bengoechea (West Germany) Ulrich Pinner

=== July ===
Week of	Tournament	Champions	Runners-up	Semifinalists	Quarterfinalists
July 4	Essen Challenger (West Germany) Essen, West Germany; Clay – $25,000 – 48S/24D; Singles draw – Doubles draw	(West Germany) Rolf Gehring; 6–4, 6–3	(Spain) José López-Maeso	(United States) Steve Meister (United States) Rick Fagel	(New Zealand) David Mustard (United States) Scott Lipton (West Germany) Peter Elter (Sweden) Joakim Nyström
July 4	Essen Challenger (West Germany) Essen, West Germany; Clay – $25,000 – 48S/24D; Singles draw – Doubles draw	(South Africa) Mike Myburg (South Africa) Christo van Rensburg; 6–4, 6–2	(United Kingdom) Nick Brown (United Kingdom) Steve Shaw	(United States) Steve Meister (United States) Rick Fagel	(New Zealand) David Mustard (United States) Scott Lipton (West Germany) Peter Elter (Sweden) Joakim Nyström
July 11	No tournaments scheduled.				
July 18	Santos Challenger (Brazil) Santos, Brazil; Clay – $25,000 – 32S/16D; Singles draw – Doubles draw	(Brazil) Júlio Góes; 6–2, 6–3	(Brazil) Carlos Kirmayr	(Colombia) Javier Restrepo (Brazil) Ivan Kley	(Finland) Leo Palin (Uruguay) Daniel Montes de Oca (United States) Bruce Kleege (United States) Junie Chatman
July 18	Santos Challenger (Brazil) Santos, Brazil; Clay – $25,000 – 32S/16D; Singles draw – Doubles draw	(United States) Junie Chatman (Finland) Leo Palin; 7–6, 6–2	(Brazil) Edvaldo Oliveira (Brazil) Fernando Roese	(Colombia) Javier Restrepo (Brazil) Ivan Kley	(Finland) Leo Palin (Uruguay) Daniel Montes de Oca (United States) Bruce Kleege (United States) Junie Chatman
July 25	Campos Challenger (Brazil) Campos, Brazil; Hard – $50,000 – 32S/16D; Singles draw – Doubles draw	(United States) Rocky Royer; 7–6, 3–6, 6–3	(Brazil) Carlos Kirmayr	(Brazil) Givaldo Barbosa (Brazil) Fernando Roese	(Brazil) Roger Guedes (United States) Junie Chatman (Brazil) Thomaz Koch (Brazil) Ney Keller
July 25	Campos Challenger (Brazil) Campos, Brazil; Hard – $50,000 – 32S/16D; Singles draw – Doubles draw	(Brazil) Thomaz Koch (Brazil) José Schmidt; 7–6, 6–2	(Brazil) Júlio Góes (Brazil) Ney Keller	(Brazil) Givaldo Barbosa (Brazil) Fernando Roese	(Brazil) Roger Guedes (United States) Junie Chatman (Brazil) Thomaz Koch (Brazil) Ney Keller
July 25	Neu-Ulm Challenger (West Germany) Neu-Ulm, West Germany; Clay – $25,000 – 64S/32D; Singles draw – Doubles draw	(Czechoslovakia) Tomáš Šmíd; 7–5, 6–4	(Australia) Trevor Allan	(Czechoslovakia) Jaroslav Navrátil (West Germany) Stefan Hermann	(Czechoslovakia) Miloslav Mečíř (Netherlands) Michiel Schapers (Italy) Simone Colombo (Hungary) Balázs Taróczy
July 25	Neu-Ulm Challenger (West Germany) Neu-Ulm, West Germany; Clay – $25,000 – 64S/32D; Singles draw – Doubles draw	(Switzerland) Heinz Günthardt (Hungary) Balázs Taróczy; 6–2, 6–4	(United Kingdom) Andrew Jarrett (United Kingdom) Jonathan Smith	(Czechoslovakia) Jaroslav Navrátil (West Germany) Stefan Hermann	(Czechoslovakia) Miloslav Mečíř (Netherlands) Michiel Schapers (Italy) Simone Colombo (Hungary) Balázs Taróczy

=== August ===
Week of	Tournament	Champions	Runners-up	Semifinalists	Quarterfinalists
August 1	No tournaments scheduled.				
August 8	No tournaments scheduled.				
August 15	Le Touquet Challenger (France) Le Touquet, France; Clay – $25,000 – 32S/16D; Singles draw – Doubles draw	(Peru) Pablo Arraya; 6–2, 6–3	(Argentina) Roberto Argüello	(Argentina) Carlos Gattiker (West Germany) Hans-Dieter Beutel	(Spain) Fernando Soler (France) Christophe Casa (France) Patrice Kuchna (Spain) Gabriel Urpí
August 15	Le Touquet Challenger (France) Le Touquet, France; Clay – $25,000 – 32S/16D; Singles draw – Doubles draw	(Argentina) Carlos Gattiker (Argentina) Alejandro Gattiker; 7–6, 6–2	(France) Tarik Benhabiles (France) Jean-Louis Haillet	(Argentina) Carlos Gattiker (West Germany) Hans-Dieter Beutel	(Spain) Fernando Soler (France) Christophe Casa (France) Patrice Kuchna (Spain) Gabriel Urpí
August 22	Vigo Challenger (Spain) Vigo, Spain; Clay – $25,000 – 32S/16D; Singles draw – Doubles draw	(South Africa) Henri de Wet; 1–6, 6–3, 6–3	(United States) Pender Murphy	(Spain) Gabriel Urpí (Italy) Luca Bottazzi	(Argentina) Roberto Argüello (Spain) Ernesto Vázquez (Argentina) Horacio de la Peña (Mexico) Francisco Maciel
August 22	Vigo Challenger (Spain) Vigo, Spain; Clay – $25,000 – 32S/16D; Singles draw – Doubles draw	(Spain) Lorenzo Fargas (Spain) Gabriel Urpí; 6–4, 4–6, 6–2	(Chile) Iván Camus (Ecuador) Raúl Viver	(Spain) Gabriel Urpí (Italy) Luca Bottazzi	(Argentina) Roberto Argüello (Spain) Ernesto Vázquez (Argentina) Horacio de la Peña (Mexico) Francisco Maciel
August 29	No tournaments scheduled.				

=== September ===
Week of	Tournament	Champions	Runners-up	Semifinalists	Quarterfinalists
September 5	International Tournament of Messina (Italy) Messina, Italy; Clay – $50,000 – 32S/16D; Singles draw – Doubles draw	(Bolivia) Mario Martinez; 6–7, 6–0, 9–7	(France) Patrice Kuchna	(Sweden) Johan Carlsson (Sweden) Peter Carlsson	(Spain) Juan Aguilera (Peru) Pablo Arraya (Australia) Trevor Allan (Sweden) Jan Sandberg
September 5	International Tournament of Messina (Italy) Messina, Italy; Clay – $50,000 – 32S/16D; Singles draw – Doubles draw	(Argentina) Carlos Gattiker (Argentina) Alejandro Gattiker; 7–5, 6–2	(Spain) Juan Aguilera (Peru) Pablo Arraya	(Sweden) Johan Carlsson (Sweden) Peter Carlsson	(Spain) Juan Aguilera (Peru) Pablo Arraya (Australia) Trevor Allan (Sweden) Jan Sandberg
September 12	Thessaloniki Challenger (Greece) Thessaloniki, Greece; Clay – $25,000 – 32S/16D; Singles draw – Doubles draw	(Argentina) Horacio de la Peña; 5–7, 7–6, 7–5	(South Africa) Rory Chappell	(South Africa) Mike Myburg (Sweden) Peter Carlsson	(United States) Andy Andrews (United Kingdom) Steve Shaw (United States) Billy Nealon (France) Jacques Hervet
September 12	Thessaloniki Challenger (Greece) Thessaloniki, Greece; Clay – $25,000 – 32S/16D; Singles draw – Doubles draw	(Denmark) Peter Bastiansen (Denmark) Michael Mortensen; 7–6, 7–5	(South Africa) Mike Myburg (Finland) Leo Palin	(South Africa) Mike Myburg (Sweden) Peter Carlsson	(United States) Andy Andrews (United Kingdom) Steve Shaw (United States) Billy Nealon (France) Jacques Hervet
September 19	No tournaments scheduled.				
September 26	No tournaments scheduled.				

=== October ===
Week of	Tournament	Champions	Runners-up	Semifinalists	Quarterfinalists
October 3	No tournaments scheduled.				
October 10	No tournaments scheduled.				
October 17	Sydney Challenger (Australia) Sydney, Australia; Hard – $25,000 – 64S/32D; Singles draw – Doubles draw	(Australia) Simon Youl; 3–6, 7–5, 6–2	(Australia) John Frawley	(Australia) Wally Masur (Australia) Lawrence Hall	(Australia) Russell Barlow (United States) Jonathan Canter (Brazil) Eduardo Oncins (New Zealand) David Lewis
October 17	Sydney Challenger (Australia) Sydney, Australia; Hard – $25,000 – 64S/32D; Singles draw – Doubles draw	(Australia) Michael Fancutt (Australia) Wally Masur; 7–5, 6–3	(Australia) Peter Carter (Australia) Mark Kratzmann	(Australia) Wally Masur (Australia) Lawrence Hall	(Australia) Russell Barlow (United States) Jonathan Canter (Brazil) Eduardo Oncins (New Zealand) David Lewis
October 24	Helsinki Challenger (Finland) Helsinki, Finland; Hard (i) – $25,000 – 32S/16D; Singles draw – Doubles draw	(United States) Erick Iskersky; 6–4, 4–6, 7–5	(Israel) Amos Mansdorf	(Finland) Olli Rahnasto (Sweden) Peter Lundgren	(United States) Randy Druz (Denmark) Peter Bastiansen (Italy) Luca Bottazzi (Finland) Leo Palin
October 24	Helsinki Challenger (Finland) Helsinki, Finland; Hard (i) – $25,000 – 32S/16D; Singles draw – Doubles draw	(Finland) Kimmo Alkio (Finland) Olli Rahnasto; 6–4, 5–7, 6–3	(United States) Erick Iskersky (United Kingdom) Richard Lewis	(Finland) Olli Rahnasto (Sweden) Peter Lundgren	(United States) Randy Druz (Denmark) Peter Bastiansen (Italy) Luca Bottazzi (Finland) Leo Palin
October 31	No tournaments scheduled.				

=== November ===
Week of	Tournament	Champions	Runners-up	Semifinalists	Quarterfinalists
November 7	No tournaments scheduled.				
November 14	No tournaments scheduled.				
November 21	Benin City Challenger (Nigeria) Benin City, Nigeria; Hard – $50,000 – 32S/16D; Singles draw – Doubles draw	(Nigeria) Nduka Odizor; 6–4, 6–2	(Italy) Ferrante Rocchi	(Puerto Rico) Ernie Fernández (France) Thierry Pham	(Nigeria) David Imonitie (France) Jacques Hervet (Austria) Bernhard Pils (Austria) Hans-Peter Kandler
November 21	Benin City Challenger (Nigeria) Benin City, Nigeria; Hard – $50,000 – 32S/16D; Singles draw – Doubles draw	(Zimbabwe) Haroon Ismail (Nigeria) Nduka Odizor; 7–6, 7–6	(France) Jacques Hervet (France) Thierry Pham	(Puerto Rico) Ernie Fernández (France) Thierry Pham	(Nigeria) David Imonitie (France) Jacques Hervet (Austria) Bernhard Pils (Austria) Hans-Peter Kandler

== Statistical information ==
These tables present the number of singles (S) and doubles (D) titles won by each player and each nation during the season, within all the tournament categories of the 1983 ATP Challenger Series. The players/nations are sorted by: (1) total number of titles (a doubles title won by two players representing the same nation counts as only one win for the nation); (2) a singles > doubles hierarchy; (3) alphabetical order (by family names for players).

=== Titles won by player ===
Total	Player	S	D
3	Zoltan Kuharszky (HUN)	2	1
2	Henrik Sundström (SWE)	2	0
2	Robbie Venter (RSA)	2	0
2	John Austin (USA)	1	1
2	Wally Masur (AUS)	1	1
2	Nduka Odizor (NGR)	1	1
2	Leo Palin (FIN)	1	1
2	Larry Stefanki (USA)	1	1
2	Peter Bastiansen (DEN)	0	2
2	Charlie Fancutt (AUS)	0	2
2	Alejandro Gattiker (ARG)	0	2
2	Carlos Gattiker (ARG)	0	2
2	Haroon Ismail (ZIM)	0	2
2	Andrew Jarrett (GBR)	0	2
2	Michael Mortensen (DEN)	0	2
2	Mike Myburg (RSA)	0	2
2	Huub van Boeckel (NED)	0	2
2	Christo van Rensburg (RSA)	0	2
1	Pablo Arraya (PER)	1	0
1	Corrado Barazzutti (ITA)	1	0
1	Hans-Dieter Beutel (FRG)	1	0
1	Jimmy Brown (USA)	1	0
1	Francesco Cancellotti (ITA)	1	0
1	Horacio de la Peña (ARG)	1	0
1	Henri de Wet (RSA)	1	0
1	Tsuyoshi Fukui (JPN)	1	0
1	Rolf Gehring (FRG)	1	0
1	Vitas Gerulaitis (USA)	1	0
1	Shlomo Glickstein (ISR)	1	0
1	Júlio Góes (BRA)	1	0
1	Erick Iskersky (USA)	1	0
1	Patrice Kuchna (FRA)	1	0
1	Mario Martinez (BOL)	1	0
1	Marko Ostoja (YUG)	1	0
1	Rocky Royer (USA)	1	0
1	Michiel Schapers (NED)	1	0
1	Leif Shiras (USA)	1	0
1	Tomáš Šmíd (TCH)	1	0
1	Roland Stadler (SUI)	1	0
1	Michael Westphal (FRG)	1	0
1	Craig Wittus (USA)	1	0
1	Simon Youl (AUS)	1	0
1	Kimmo Alkio (FIN)	0	1
1	Vijay Amritraj (IND)	0	1
1	Joel Bailey (USA)	0	1
1	Givaldo Barbosa (BRA)	0	1
1	Mike Barr (USA)	0	1
1	John Benson (USA)	0	1
1	Luca Bottazzi (ITA)	0	1
1	Iván Camus (CHI)	0	1
1	David Carter (AUS)	0	1
1	Wesley Cash (USA)	0	1
1	Junie Chatman (USA)	0	1
1	Simone Colombo (ITA)	0	1
1	Bruce Derlin (NZL)	0	1
1	Colin Dowdeswell (GBR)	0	1
1	Robin Drysdale (GBR)	0	1
1	Broderick Dyke (AUS)	0	1
1	Lorenzo Fargas (ESP)	0	1
1	Rod Frawley (AUS)	0	1
1	Heinz Günthardt (SUI)	0	1
1	Per Hjertquist (SWE)	0	1
1	Jakob Hlasek (SUI)	0	1
1	Chris Johnstone (AUS)	0	1
1	Ney Keller (BRA)	0	1
1	Thomaz Koch (BRA)	0	1
1	John Mattke (USA)	0	1
1	Gabriel Mattos (BRA)	0	1
1	Frew McMillan (RSA)	0	1
1	Steve Meister (USA)	0	1
1	Richard Meyer (USA)	0	1
1	Gilles Moretton (FRA)	0	1
1	Ilie Năstase (ROU)	0	1
1	Andrew Pattison (ZIM)	0	1
1	Olli Rahnasto (FIN)	0	1
1	José Schmidt (BRA)	0	1
1	Jonathan Smith (GBR)	0	1
1	Charles Strode (USA)	0	1
1	Morris Strode (USA)	0	1
1	Stefan Svensson (SWE)	0	1
1	Balázs Taróczy (HUN)	0	1
1	Jeff Turpin (USA)	0	1
1	Gabriel Urpi (ESP)	0	1
1	Raul Viver (ECU)	0	1
1	Butch Walts (USA)	0	1
1	Greg Whitecross (AUS)	0	1

=== Titles won by nation ===
Total	Nation	S	D
18	United States (USA)	8	10
7	Australia (AUS)	2	5
6	South Africa (RSA)	3	3
4	Hungary (HUN)	2	2
4	Sweden (SWE)	2	2
4	Brazil (BRA)	1	3
3	West Germany (FRG)	3	0
3	Italy (ITA)	2	1
3	Argentina (ARG)	1	2
3	Finland (FIN)	1	2
3	Netherlands (NED)	1	2
3	Switzerland (SUI)	1	2
3	Great Britain (GBR)	0	3
3	Zimbabwe (ZIM)	0	3
2	France (FRA)	1	1
2	Nigeria (NGR)	1	1
2	Denmark (DEN)	0	2
1	Bolivia (BOL)	1	0
1	Czechoslovakia (TCH)	1	0
1	Israel (ISR)	1	0
1	Japan (JPN)	1	0
1	Peru (PER)	1	0
1	Yugoslavia (YUG)	1	0
1	Chile (CHI)	0	1
1	Ecuador (ECU)	0	1
1	India (IND)	0	1
1	New Zealand (NZL)	0	1
1	Romania (ROU)	0	1
1	Spain (ESP)	0	1

== See also ==
- 1983 Grand Prix
- Association of Tennis Professionals
- International Tennis Federation
