= 1984 ATP Challenger Series =

1984 tennis tour

Details
- Duration: 2 January 1984 – 2 December 1984
- Edition: 7th
- Tournaments: 31

Achievements (singles)

The ATP Challenger Series is the second-tier tour for professional tennis organised by the Association of Tennis Professionals (ATP). The 1984 ATP Challenger Series calendar comprises 32 tournaments, with prize money ranging from $25,000 up to $75,000.

== Schedule ==
=== January ===
Week of	Tournament	Champions	Runners-up	Semifinalists	Quarterfinalists
January 2	Perth Challenger (Australia) Perth, Australia; Grass – $25,000 – 32S/16D; Singles draw – Doubles draw	(South Africa) Brian Levine; 6–1, 6–2	(United States) Lloyd Bourne	(Australia) Craig A. Miller (Australia) John Frawley	(Australia) Greg Whitecross (France) Jérôme Vanier (Australia) Mark Kratzmann (United States) Jonathan Canter
January 2	Perth Challenger (Australia) Perth, Australia; Grass – $25,000 – 32S/16D; Singles draw – Doubles draw	(Australia) Broderick Dyke (United States) John Van Nostrand; 6–2, 6–3	(Australia) Peter Carter (Australia) Mark Hartnett	(Australia) Craig A. Miller (Australia) John Frawley	(Australia) Greg Whitecross (France) Jérôme Vanier (Australia) Mark Kratzmann (United States) Jonathan Canter
January 9	No tournaments scheduled.				
January 16	Amarillo Challenger (United States) Amarillo, USA $25,000 – hard (I) – 32S/16D; Singles draw – Doubles draw	(United States) Martin Davis; 6–4, 6–4	(United States) Robert Seguso	(United States) Bob Green (United States) Randy Nixon	(United States) Leif Shiras (United States) Bruce Manson (United States) Pat DuPré (United States) Ken Flach
January 16	Amarillo Challenger (United States) Amarillo, USA $25,000 – hard (I) – 32S/16D; Singles draw – Doubles draw	(United States) Martin Davis (United States) Chris Dunk; 6–2, 6–3	(United States) Mike Brunnberg (United States) Bruce Kleege	(United States) Bob Green (United States) Randy Nixon	(United States) Leif Shiras (United States) Bruce Manson (United States) Pat DuPré (United States) Ken Flach
January 23	Guarujá Challenger (Brazil) Guarujá, Brazil; Clay – $75,000 – 48S/24D; Singles draw – Doubles draw	(Brazil) Givaldo Barbosa; 6–4, 6–3	(Chile) Pedro Rebolledo	(Peru) Pablo Arraya (Chile) Jaime Fillol	(Argentina) Francisco Yunis (Chile) Álvaro Fillol (Brazil) Eleutério Martins (Brazil) Cássio Motta
January 23	Guarujá Challenger (Brazil) Guarujá, Brazil; Clay – $75,000 – 48S/24D; Singles draw – Doubles draw	(Brazil) Marcos Hocevar (Brazil) Alexandre Hocevar; 6–7, 6–4, 6–4	(Chile) Jaime Fillol (Chile) Álvaro Fillol	(Peru) Pablo Arraya (Chile) Jaime Fillol	(Argentina) Francisco Yunis (Chile) Álvaro Fillol (Brazil) Eleutério Martins (Brazil) Cássio Motta
January 30	No tournaments scheduled.				

=== February ===
Week of	Tournament	Champions	Runners-up	Semifinalists	Quarterfinalists
February 6	Agadir Challenger (Morocco) Agadir, Morocco; Clay – $25,000 – 32S/16D; Singles draw – Doubles draw	(Spain) Alberto Tous; 6–1, 6–0	(Belgium) Bernard Boileau	(Switzerland) Claudio Mezzadri (Spain) Juan Avendaño	(Morocco) Houcine Saber (Australia) Trevor Allan (Spain) Gabriel Urpí (Spain) Roberto Vizcaíno
February 6	Agadir Challenger (Morocco) Agadir, Morocco; Clay – $25,000 – 32S/16D; Singles draw – Doubles draw	(United States) Charles Strode (United States) Morris Strode; 6–3, 6–4	(Spain) Juan Avendaño (Spain) Emilio Sánchez	(Switzerland) Claudio Mezzadri (Spain) Juan Avendaño	(Morocco) Houcine Saber (Australia) Trevor Allan (Spain) Gabriel Urpí (Spain) Roberto Vizcaíno
February 13	No tournaments scheduled.				
February 20	Palm Hills International Tennis Challenger (Egypt) Cairo, Egypt; Clay – $75,000 – 32S/16D; Singles draw – Doubles draw	(Spain) Fernando Luna; 6–4, 6–2	(United States) Mark Dickson	(United States) Terry Moor (Spain) Juan Avendaño	(Spain) Fernando Soler (Bolivia) Mario Martinez (Spain) Alberto Tous (United States) Tom Cain
February 20	Palm Hills International Tennis Challenger (Egypt) Cairo, Egypt; Clay – $75,000 – 32S/16D; Singles draw – Doubles draw	(United States) Brett Dickinson (United States) Drew Gitlin; 7–6, 6–3	(United States) Marcel Freeman (United States) Tim Wilkison	(United States) Terry Moor (Spain) Juan Avendaño	(Spain) Fernando Soler (Bolivia) Mario Martinez (Spain) Alberto Tous (United States) Tom Cain
February 27	Viña del Mar Challenger (Chile) Viña del Mar, Chile; Clay – $25,000 – 32S/16D; Singles draw – Doubles draw	(Chile) Álvaro Fillol; 6–4, 6–4	(Chile) Hans Gildemeister	(United States) Tim Wilkison (Argentina) Eduardo Bengoechea	(Argentina) Carlos Gattiker (Chile) Manuel Rodríguez (Argentina) Guillermo Rivas (Chile) Juan Pablo Queirolo
February 27	Viña del Mar Challenger (Chile) Viña del Mar, Chile; Clay – $25,000 – 32S/16D; Singles draw – Doubles draw	(Argentina) Carlos Gattiker (Argentina) Gustavo Tiberti; 6–4, 5–7, 6–3	(Chile) Hans Gildemeister (Chile) Belus Prajoux	(United States) Tim Wilkison (Argentina) Eduardo Bengoechea	(Argentina) Carlos Gattiker (Chile) Manuel Rodríguez (Argentina) Guillermo Rivas (Chile) Juan Pablo Queirolo

=== March ===
Week of	Tournament	Champions	Runners-up	Semifinalists	Quarterfinalists
March 5	Bahrain Challenger; Bahrain, Bahrain; Hard – $75,000 – 32S/16D; Singles draw – Doubles draw	(United States) Tim Wilkison; 7–5, 6–0	(United States) Terry Moor	(United States) Drew Gitlin (United States) Leif Shiras	(United States) Marcel Freeman (West Germany) Peter Elter (United States) Larry Stefanki (United States) Mark Dickson
March 5	Bahrain Challenger; Bahrain, Bahrain; Hard – $75,000 – 32S/16D; Singles draw – Doubles draw	(United States) David Dowlen (Nigeria) Nduka Odizor; 7–6, 4–6, 6–3	(United States) Martin Davis (United States) Larry Stefanki	(United States) Drew Gitlin (United States) Leif Shiras	(United States) Marcel Freeman (West Germany) Peter Elter (United States) Larry Stefanki (United States) Mark Dickson
March 5	Vienna Challenger; Vienna, Austria $25,000 – carpet (I) – 32S/16D; Singles draw – Doubles draw	(Sweden) Jan Gunnarsson; 6–3, 6–3	(United States) John Sadri	(United States) Richard Meyer (South Africa) Danie Visser	(Italy) Simone Colombo (France) Jérôme Vanier (United States) David Pate (West Germany) Rolf Gehring
March 5	Vienna Challenger; Vienna, Austria $25,000 – carpet (I) – 32S/16D; Singles draw – Doubles draw	(United States) Bruce Manson (United States) David Pate; 6–3, 6–4	(Denmark) Peter Bastiansen (Denmark) Michael Mortensen	(United States) Richard Meyer (South Africa) Danie Visser	(Italy) Simone Colombo (France) Jérôme Vanier (United States) David Pate (West Germany) Rolf Gehring
March 12	No tournaments scheduled.				
March 19	No tournaments scheduled.				
March 26	Tunis Challenger (Tunisia) Tunis, Tunisia; Clay – $50,000 – 32S/16D; Singles draw – Doubles draw	(Sweden) Henrik Sundström; 6–1, 6–4	(France) Thierry Tulasne	(Italy) Francesco Cancellotti (Spain) Fernando Luna	(Spain) Alberto Tous (Hungary) Zoltán Kuhárszky (Spain) Juan Aguilera (West Germany) Peter Elter
March 26	Tunis Challenger (Tunisia) Tunis, Tunisia; Clay – $50,000 – 32S/16D; Singles draw – Doubles draw	(Puerto Rico) Ernie Fernández (Denmark) Michael Mortensen; 6–3, 6–4	(West Germany) Peter Elter (West Germany) Andreas Maurer	(Italy) Francesco Cancellotti (Spain) Fernando Luna	(Spain) Alberto Tous (Hungary) Zoltán Kuhárszky (Spain) Juan Aguilera (West Germany) Peter Elter

=== April ===
Week of	Tournament	Champions	Runners-up	Semifinalists	Quarterfinalists
April 2	Ashkelon Challenger (Israel) Ashkelon, Israel; Hard – $25,000 – 32S/16D; Singles draw – Doubles draw	(United States) Bruce Manson; 6–7, 6–3, 7–6	(Israel) Shahar Perkiss	(United Kingdom) Jonathan Smith (Netherlands) Michiel Schapers	(Finland) Leo Palin (United States) Drew Gitlin (South Africa) Henri de Wet (United States) Jeff Turpin
April 2	Ashkelon Challenger (Israel) Ashkelon, Israel; Hard – $25,000 – 32S/16D; Singles draw – Doubles draw	(United States) Bruce Manson (United States) Jeff Turpin; 6–2, 6–2	(Finland) Leo Palin (Netherlands) Michiel Schapers	(United Kingdom) Jonathan Smith (Netherlands) Michiel Schapers	(Finland) Leo Palin (United States) Drew Gitlin (South Africa) Henri de Wet (United States) Jeff Turpin
April 9	No tournaments scheduled.				
April 16	San Luis Potosí Challenger (Mexico) San Luis Potosí, Mexico; Clay – $25,000 – 32S/16D; Singles draw – Doubles draw	(United States) Tim Wilkison; 6–2, 6–2	(Mexico) Javier Contreras	(Australia) Ross Case (Mexico) Juan Hernández	(United States) Randy Nixon (United States) Charles Strode (Mexico) Francisco Maciel (United States) Rick Fagel
April 16	San Luis Potosí Challenger (Mexico) San Luis Potosí, Mexico; Clay – $25,000 – 32S/16D; Singles draw – Doubles draw	(Mexico) Juan Hernández (Mexico) Francisco Maciel; 6–4, 6–2	(Australia) Ross Case (United States) Chris Dunk	(Australia) Ross Case (Mexico) Juan Hernández	(United States) Randy Nixon (United States) Charles Strode (Mexico) Francisco Maciel (United States) Rick Fagel
April 23	Marrakech Challenger (Morocco) Marrakesh, Morocco; Clay – $50,000 – 32S/16D; Singles draw – Doubles draw	(Chile) Hans Gildemeister; 6–7, 6–2, 6–1	(United States) Blaine Willenborg	(Italy) Simone Colombo (France) Patrice Kuchna	(United Kingdom) Jeremy Bates (West Germany) Peter Elter (Argentina) Carlos Castellan (France) Georges Goven
April 23	Marrakech Challenger (Morocco) Marrakesh, Morocco; Clay – $50,000 – 32S/16D; Singles draw – Doubles draw	(United States) Terry Moor (United States) Blaine Willenborg; 6–4, 6–7, 9–7	(United Kingdom) Jeremy Bates (Netherlands) Michiel Schapers	(Italy) Simone Colombo (France) Patrice Kuchna	(United Kingdom) Jeremy Bates (West Germany) Peter Elter (Argentina) Carlos Castellan (France) Georges Goven
April 23	Montreal Challenger; Montreal, Canada $25,000 – hard (I) – 32S/16D; Singles draw – Doubles draw	(United States) John Sadri; 6–2, 6–4	(United States) Greg Holmes	(United States) Leif Shiras (United States) Lloyd Bourne	(United States) Bud Schultz (United States) Tony Giammalva (United States) Tim Wilkison (United States) Matt Mitchell
April 23	Montreal Challenger; Montreal, Canada $25,000 – hard (I) – 32S/16D; Singles draw – Doubles draw	(United States) Andy Kohlberg (United States) Richard Meyer; 3–6, 6–4, 6–2	(United States) Sean Brawley (United States) Leif Shiras	(United States) Leif Shiras (United States) Lloyd Bourne	(United States) Bud Schultz (United States) Tony Giammalva (United States) Tim Wilkison (United States) Matt Mitchell
April 30	Parioli Challenger (Italy) Rome, Italy; Clay – $25,000 – 32S/16D; Singles draw – Doubles draw	(Australia) John Frawley; 6–4, 7–5	(Argentina) Francisco Yunis	(Switzerland) Claudio Mezzadri (Israel) Shahar Perkiss	(United States) Blaine Willenborg (Netherlands) Michiel Schapers (Italy) Luca Bottazzi (Italy) Ferrante Rocchi
April 30	Parioli Challenger (Italy) Rome, Italy; Clay – $25,000 – 32S/16D; Singles draw – Doubles draw	(Italy) Simone Colombo (Italy) Gianni Ocleppo; 4–6, 6–4, 6–3	(Australia) John Frawley (Netherlands) Michiel Schapers	(Switzerland) Claudio Mezzadri (Israel) Shahar Perkiss	(United States) Blaine Willenborg (Netherlands) Michiel Schapers (Italy) Luca Bottazzi (Italy) Ferrante Rocchi

=== May ===
Week of	Tournament	Champions	Runners-up	Semifinalists	Quarterfinalists
May 7	Curitiba Challenger (Brazil) Curitiba, Brazil; Clay – $25,000 – 32S/16D; Singles draw – Doubles draw	(Argentina) Martín Jaite; 6–2, 6–4	(Brazil) Ivan Kley	(United States) Craig Wittus (Argentina) Alejandro Ganzábal	(Brazil) Roger Guedes (Brazil) Eleutério Martins (Brazil) Edvaldo Oliveira (Brazil) Gabriel Mattos
May 7	Curitiba Challenger (Brazil) Curitiba, Brazil; Clay – $25,000 – 32S/16D; Singles draw – Doubles draw	(Brazil) Nelson Aerts (Brazil) Alexandre Hocevar; 6–4, 2–6, 7–6	(Brazil) Ivan Kley (Brazil) Fernando Roese	(United States) Craig Wittus (Argentina) Alejandro Ganzábal	(Brazil) Roger Guedes (Brazil) Eleutério Martins (Brazil) Edvaldo Oliveira (Brazil) Gabriel Mattos
May 7	Nagoya Challenger (Japan) Nagoya, Japan; Hard – $25,000 – 32S/16D; Singles draw – Doubles draw	(United States) Glenn Layendecker; 7–5, 6–4	(New Zealand) David Mustard	(United States) Jeff Turpin (United States) David Dowlen	(Japan) Shigeyuki Nishio (United States) Charles Strode (Australia) Charlie Fancutt (United States) Joel Bailey
May 7	Sutton Challenger (United Kingdom) Sutton, Great Britain; Clay – $25,000 – 32S/16D; Singles draw – Doubles draw	(New Zealand) David Mustard; 3–6, 6–4, 6–2	(United Kingdom) Steve Shaw	(Czechoslovakia) Stanislav Birner (Italy) Ferrante Rocchi	(France) Jacques Hervet (France) Georges Goven (Finland) Olli Rahnasto (France) Bruno Dadillon
May 7	Sutton Challenger (United Kingdom) Sutton, Great Britain; Clay – $25,000 – 32S/16D; Singles draw – Doubles draw	(Australia) Mark Kratzmann (Australia) Simon Youl; 4–6, 6–3, 6–4	(Czechoslovakia) Stanislav Birner (Australia) Broderick Dyke	(Czechoslovakia) Stanislav Birner (Italy) Ferrante Rocchi	(France) Jacques Hervet (France) Georges Goven (Finland) Olli Rahnasto (France) Bruno Dadillon
May 14	Lee-on-Solent Challenger (United Kingdom) Lee-on-Solent, Great Britain; Clay – $25,000 – 32S/16D; Singles draw – Doubles draw	(Australia) Simon Youl; 7–6, 4–6, 6–3	(United Kingdom) Jeremy Bates	(New Zealand) David Mustard (Sweden) Magnus Tideman	(United States) Bruce Manson (Israel) Shahar Perkiss (United States) Bruce Foxworth (Ecuador) Raúl Viver
May 14	Spring Challenger (United States) Spring, USA $25,000 – hard (I) – 32S/16D; Singles draw – Doubles draw	(India) Vijay Amritraj; 7–5, 4–6, 7–6	(United States) Leif Shiras	(Nigeria) Nduka Odizor (United States) Andy Kohlberg	(United States) Ron Hightower (United States) John Mattke (United States) David Dowlen (United States) Mark Wooldridge
May 14	Spring Challenger (United States) Spring, USA $25,000 – hard (I) – 32S/16D; Singles draw – Doubles draw	(United States) Andy Kohlberg (United States) Richard Meyer; 6–4, 3–6, 7–6	(United States) Ron Hightower (United States) John Mattke	(Nigeria) Nduka Odizor (United States) Andy Kohlberg	(United States) Ron Hightower (United States) John Mattke (United States) David Dowlen (United States) Mark Wooldridge
May 21	No tournaments scheduled.				
May 28	No tournaments scheduled.				

=== June ===
Week of	Tournament	Champions	Runners-up	Semifinalists	Quarterfinalists
June 4	Bielefeld Challenger (West Germany) Bielefeld, West Germany; Clay – $25,000 – 64S/32D; Singles draw – Doubles draw	(Czechoslovakia) Josef Čihák; 6–2, 7–5	(West Germany) Peter Elter	(West Germany) Wolfgang Popp (Soviet Union) Alexander Zverev	(Paraguay) Víctor Pecci (Argentina) Carlos Castellan (Spain) José López-Maeso (West Germany) Hans-Dieter Beutel
June 4	Bielefeld Challenger (West Germany) Bielefeld, West Germany; Clay – $25,000 – 64S/32D; Singles draw – Doubles draw	(West Germany) Peter Elter (West Germany) Stefan Hermann; 6–4, 6–4	(Netherlands) Huub van Boeckel (Belgium) Jan Vanlangendonck	(West Germany) Wolfgang Popp (Soviet Union) Alexander Zverev	(Paraguay) Víctor Pecci (Argentina) Carlos Castellan (Spain) José López-Maeso (West Germany) Hans-Dieter Beutel
June 4	Tampere Open (Finland) Tampere, Finland; Clay – $25,000 – 32S/16D; Singles draw – Doubles draw	(Italy) Luca Bottazzi; 6–2, 6–3	(Sweden) Peter Svensson	(United States) Jon Levine (Sweden) Johan Carlsson	(Denmark) Peter Bastiansen (Italy) Massimo Zampieri (Norway) Morten Rønneberg (United States) Bruce Manson
June 4	Tampere Open (Finland) Tampere, Finland; Clay – $25,000 – 32S/16D; Singles draw – Doubles draw	(New Zealand) David Mustard (United Kingdom) Jonathan Smith; 6–3, 6–4	(Sweden) Ronnie Båthman (Italy) Luca Bottazzi	(United States) Jon Levine (Sweden) Johan Carlsson	(Denmark) Peter Bastiansen (Italy) Massimo Zampieri (Norway) Morten Rønneberg (United States) Bruce Manson
June 11	Brescia Challenger (Italy) Brescia, Italy; Clay – $25,000 – 32S/16D; Singles draw – Doubles draw	(France) Christophe Roger-Vasselin; 6–4, 7–6	(Spain) Jordi Arrese	(Spain) Roberto Vizcaíno (Spain) Jorge Bardou	(Italy) Massimo Zampieri (Argentina) Francisco Yunis (Ecuador) Raúl Viver (Argentina) Martín Jaite
June 11	Brescia Challenger (Italy) Brescia, Italy; Clay – $25,000 – 32S/16D; Singles draw – Doubles draw	(France) Jacques Hervet (France) Jérôme Vanier; 7–5, 2–6, 6–4	(Argentina) Alejandro Ganzábal (Argentina) Carlos Gattiker	(Spain) Roberto Vizcaíno (Spain) Jorge Bardou	(Italy) Massimo Zampieri (Argentina) Francisco Yunis (Ecuador) Raúl Viver (Argentina) Martín Jaite
June 18	Dortmund Challenger (West Germany) Dortmund, West Germany; Clay – $25,000 – 64S/32D; Singles draw – Doubles draw	(Mexico) Francisco Maciel; 6–2, 6–4	(Paraguay) Víctor Pecci	(Argentina) Eduardo Bengoechea (Sweden) Magnus Tideman	(Belgium) Jan Vanlangendonck (Chile) Jaime Fillol (West Germany) Karl Meiler (West Germany) Damir Keretić
June 18	Dortmund Challenger (West Germany) Dortmund, West Germany; Clay – $25,000 – 64S/32D; Singles draw – Doubles draw	(Chile) Jaime Fillol (Chile) Álvaro Fillol; 6–3, 6–4	(Argentina) Eduardo Bengoechea (Spain) José López-Maeso	(Argentina) Eduardo Bengoechea (Sweden) Magnus Tideman	(Belgium) Jan Vanlangendonck (Chile) Jaime Fillol (West Germany) Karl Meiler (West Germany) Damir Keretić
June 25	No tournaments scheduled.				

=== July ===
Week of	Tournament	Champions	Runners-up	Semifinalists	Quarterfinalists
July 2	Travemünde Challenger (West Germany) Travemünde, West Germany; Clay – $25,000 – 48S/24D; Singles draw – Doubles draw	(Soviet Union) Vadim Borisov; 7–5, 7–5	(Argentina) Alejandro Ganzábal	(West Germany) Eric Jelen (West Germany) Karl Meiler	(Spain) Juan Avendaño (Chile) Álvaro Fillol (West Germany) Damir Keretić (Spain) Sergio Casal
July 2	Travemünde Challenger (West Germany) Travemünde, West Germany; Clay – $25,000 – 48S/24D; Singles draw – Doubles draw	(Sweden) Johan Carlsson (Sweden) Peter Svensson; 5–7, 6–4, 6–2	(Socialist Federal Republic of Yugoslavia) Igor Flego (Israel) Shahar Perkiss	(West Germany) Eric Jelen (West Germany) Karl Meiler	(Spain) Juan Avendaño (Chile) Álvaro Fillol (West Germany) Damir Keretić (Spain) Sergio Casal
July 9	Neunkirchen Challenger (West Germany) Neunkirchen, West Germany; Clay – $25,000 – 64S/24D; Singles draw – Doubles draw	(Czechoslovakia) Marián Vajda; 6–2, 7–5	(Czechoslovakia) Miroslav Lacek	(Brazil) Ivan Kley (Argentina) Marcelo Ingaramo	(Mexico) Francisco Maciel (Ecuador) Raúl Viver (Peru) Carlos di Laura (Argentina) Carlos Castellan
July 9	Neunkirchen Challenger (West Germany) Neunkirchen, West Germany; Clay – $25,000 – 64S/24D; Singles draw – Doubles draw	(West Germany) Hans-Dieter Beutel (West Germany) Christoph Zipf; 7–6, 7–5	(West Germany) Ulf Fischer (West Germany) Eric Jelen	(Brazil) Ivan Kley (Argentina) Marcelo Ingaramo	(Mexico) Francisco Maciel (Ecuador) Raúl Viver (Peru) Carlos di Laura (Argentina) Carlos Castellan
July 16	No tournaments scheduled.				
July 23	No tournaments scheduled.				
July 30	Neu-Ulm Challenger (West Germany) Neu-Ulm, West Germany; Clay – $25,000 – 48S/24D; Singles draw – Doubles draw	(Sweden) Kent Carlsson; 6–3, 6–1	(Ecuador) Raúl Viver	(Czechoslovakia) Marián Vajda (Soviet Union) Andrei Chesnokov	(Soviet Union) Alexander Zverev (West Germany) Andreas Maurer (Soviet Union) Vadim Borisov (Czechoslovakia) Jaroslav Navrátil
July 30	Neu-Ulm Challenger (West Germany) Neu-Ulm, West Germany; Clay – $25,000 – 48S/24D; Singles draw – Doubles draw	(West Germany) Stefan Hermann (South Africa) Brian Levine; 6–4, 7–5	(Brazil) Eduardo Oncins (Brazil) Fernando Roese	(Czechoslovakia) Marián Vajda (Soviet Union) Andrei Chesnokov	(Soviet Union) Alexander Zverev (West Germany) Andreas Maurer (Soviet Union) Vadim Borisov (Czechoslovakia) Jaroslav Navrátil

=== August ===
Week of	Tournament	Champions	Runners-up	Semifinalists	Quarterfinalists
August 6	No tournaments scheduled.				
August 13	Nielsen Pro Tennis Championship (United States) Winnetka, USA; Hard – $25,000 – 32S/16D; Singles draw – Doubles draw	(United States) Marc Flur; 6–3, 6–4	(United States) Mike Leach	(United States) David Pate (United States) David Dowlen	(United States) Andy Andrews (South Africa) Brian Levine (United States) Howard Sands (United Kingdom) Steve Shaw
August 13	Nielsen Pro Tennis Championship (United States) Winnetka, USA; Hard – $25,000 – 32S/16D; Singles draw – Doubles draw	(United States) Dan Goldie (United States) Michael Kures; 3–6, 6–4, 7–5	(Chile) Ricardo Acuña (Chile) Belus Prajoux	(United States) David Pate (United States) David Dowlen	(United States) Andy Andrews (South Africa) Brian Levine (United States) Howard Sands (United Kingdom) Steve Shaw
August 20	No tournaments scheduled.				
August 27	No tournaments scheduled.				

=== September ===
Week of	Tournament	Champions	Runners-up	Semifinalists	Quarterfinalists
September 3	International Tournament of Messina (Italy) Messina, Italy; Clay – $50,000 – 32S/16D; Singles draw – Doubles draw	(Paraguay) Víctor Pecci; 6–0, 6–3	(Argentina) Eduardo Bengoechea	(Czechoslovakia) Miloslav Mečíř (Argentina) Martín Jaite	(Italy) Ferrante Rocchi (France) Tarik Benhabiles (Sweden) Kent Carlsson (Italy) Marcello Bassanelli
September 3	International Tournament of Messina (Italy) Messina, Italy; Clay – $50,000 – 32S/16D; Singles draw – Doubles draw	(Sweden) Ronnie Båthman (Sweden) Magnus Tideman; 1–6, 6–1, 10–8	(Argentina) Martín Jaite (Paraguay) Víctor Pecci	(Czechoslovakia) Miloslav Mečíř (Argentina) Martín Jaite	(Italy) Ferrante Rocchi (France) Tarik Benhabiles (Sweden) Kent Carlsson (Italy) Marcello Bassanelli
September 10	Thessaloniki Challenger (Greece) Thessaloniki, Greece; Clay – $25,000 – 32S/16D; Singles draw – Doubles draw	(United Kingdom) Steve Shaw; 6–2, 6–4	(Sweden) Stefan Svensson	(United States) Egan Adams (Sweden) Magnus Tideman	(Brazil) Eduardo Oncins (United States) Roger Knapp (Mexico) Guillermo Stevens (Argentina) Marcelo Ingaramo
September 10	Thessaloniki Challenger (Greece) Thessaloniki, Greece; Clay – $25,000 – 32S/16D; Singles draw – Doubles draw	(United Kingdom) Jeremy Bates (United Kingdom) Steve Shaw; 6–2, 6–4	(Greece) George Kalovelonis (Socialist Federal Republic of Yugoslavia) Slobodan Živojinović	(United States) Egan Adams (Sweden) Magnus Tideman	(Brazil) Eduardo Oncins (United States) Roger Knapp (Mexico) Guillermo Stevens (Argentina) Marcelo Ingaramo
September 17	No tournaments scheduled.				
September 24	No tournaments scheduled.				

=== November ===
Week of	Tournament	Champions	Runners-up	Semifinalists	Quarterfinalists
November 5	Helsinki Challenger; Helsinki, Finland $25,000 – hard (I) – 32S/16D; Singles draw – Doubles draw	(Switzerland) Jakob Hlasek; 6–4, 6–3	(Sweden) Johan Carlsson	(Finland) Leo Palin (Sweden) Jörgen Windahl	(Sweden) Jonas Svensson (United States) Andy Kohlberg (Finland) Olli Rahnasto (Sweden) Ronnie Båthman
November 5	Helsinki Challenger; Helsinki, Finland $25,000 – hard (I) – 32S/16D; Singles draw – Doubles draw	(Switzerland) Jakob Hlasek (Brazil) Alexandre Hocevar; 7–6, 6–4	(Sweden) Ronnie Båthman (Sweden) Magnus Tideman	(Finland) Leo Palin (Sweden) Jörgen Windahl	(Sweden) Jonas Svensson (United States) Andy Kohlberg (Finland) Olli Rahnasto (Sweden) Ronnie Båthman
November 12	No tournaments scheduled.				
November 19	Benin City Challenger (Nigeria) Benin City, Nigeria; Hard – $50,000 – 32S/16D; Singles draw – Doubles draw	(Nigeria) Nduka Odizor; 6–2, 6–2	(Italy) Alessandro de Minicis	(Nigeria) Sadiq Abdullahi (United States) Mark Wooldridge	(Nigeria) David Imonitie (Greece) George Kalovelonis (France) Bruno Dadillon (Switzerland) Dominik Utzinger
November 19	Benin City Challenger (Nigeria) Benin City, Nigeria; Hard – $50,000 – 32S/16D; Singles draw – Doubles draw	(Nigeria) Tony Mmoh (Nigeria) Nduka Odizor; Defaulted	(Netherlands) Menno Oosting (United States) Mark Wooldridge	(Nigeria) Sadiq Abdullahi (United States) Mark Wooldridge	(Nigeria) David Imonitie (Greece) George Kalovelonis (France) Bruno Dadillon (Switzerland) Dominik Utzinger
November 26	Bahia Challenger (Brazil) Bahia, Brazil; Hard – $75,000 – 32S/16D; Singles draw – Doubles draw	(Argentina) Horacio de la Peña; 6–4, 5–7, 7–5	(Brazil) Marcos Hocevar	(Argentina) José Luis Clerc (Chile) Ricardo Acuña	(Argentina) Eduardo Bengoechea (Brazil) Eleutério Martins (Chile) Pedro Rebolledo (Brazil) Ivan Kley
November 26	Bahia Challenger (Brazil) Bahia, Brazil; Hard – $75,000 – 32S/16D; Singles draw – Doubles draw	(Chile) Ricardo Acuña (Chile) Hans Gildemeister; 6–3, 1–6, 7–6	(Brazil) Givaldo Barbosa (Brazil) João Soares	(Argentina) José Luis Clerc (Chile) Ricardo Acuña	(Argentina) Eduardo Bengoechea (Brazil) Eleutério Martins (Chile) Pedro Rebolledo (Brazil) Ivan Kley

== Statistical information ==
These tables present the number of singles (S) and doubles (D) titles won by each player and each nation during the season, within all the tournament categories of the 1984 ATP Challenger Series. The players/nations are sorted by: (1) total number of titles (a doubles title won by two players representing the same nation counts as only one win for the nation); (2) a singles > doubles hierarchy; (3) alphabetical order (by family names for players).

=== Titles won by player ===
Total	Player	S	D
3	Bruce Manson (USA)	1	2
3	Nduka Odizor (NGR)	1	2
3	Alexandre Hocevar (BRA)	0	3
2	Tim Wilkison (USA)	2	0
2	Martin Davis (USA)	1	1
2	Álvaro Fillol (CHI)	1	1
2	Hans Gildemeister (CHI)	1	1
2	Jakob Hlasek (SUI)	1	1
2	Brian Levine (RSA)	1	1
2	Francisco Maciel (MEX)	1	1
2	David Mustard (NZL)	1	1
2	Steve Shaw (GBR)	1	1
2	Simon Youl (AUS)	1	1
2	Stefan Hermann (FRG)	0	2
2	Andy Kohlberg (USA)	0	2
2	Richard Meyer (USA)	0	2
1	Vijay Amritraj (IND)	1	0
1	Givaldo Barbosa (BRA)	1	0
1	Vadim Borisov (URS)	1	0
1	Luca Bottazzi (ITA)	1	0
1	Kent Carlsson (SWE)	1	0
1	Josef Čihák (TCH)	1	0
1	Horacio de la Peña (ARG)	1	0
1	Marc Flur (USA)	1	0
1	John Frawley (AUS)	1	0
1	Jan Gunnarsson (SWE)	1	0
1	Martín Jaite (ARG)	1	0
1	Glenn Layendecker (USA)	1	0
1	Fernando Luna (ESP)	1	0
1	Víctor Pecci (PAR)	1	0
1	Christophe Roger-Vasselin (FRA)	1	0
1	John Sadri (USA)	1	0
1	Henrik Sundström (SWE)	1	0
1	Alberto Tous (ESP)	1	0
1	Marián Vajda (TCH)	1	0
1	Ricardo Acuña (CHI)	0	1
1	Nelson Aerts (BRA)	0	1
1	Jeremy Bates (GBR)	0	1
1	Ronnie Båthman (SWE)	0	1
1	Hans-Dieter Beutel (FRG)	0	1
1	Johan Carlsson (SWE)	0	1
1	Simone Colombo (ITA)	0	1
1	Brett Dickinson (USA)	0	1
1	David Dowlen (USA)	0	1
1	Chris Dunk (USA)	0	1
1	Broderick Dyke (AUS)	0	1
1	Peter Elter (FRG)	0	1
1	Ernie Fernandez (PUR)	0	1
1	Jaime Fillol (CHI)	0	1
1	Carlos Gattiker (ARG)	0	1
1	Drew Gitlin (USA)	0	1
1	Dan Goldie (USA)	0	1
1	Juan Hernández (MEX)	0	1
1	Jacques Hervet (FRA)	0	1
1	Marcos Hocevar (BRA)	0	1
1	Mark Kratzmann (AUS)	0	1
1	Michael Kures (USA)	0	1
1	Tony Mmoh (NGR)	0	1
1	Terry Moor (USA)	0	1
1	Michael Mortensen (DEN)	0	1
1	Gianni Ocleppo (ITA)	0	1
1	David Pate (USA)	0	1
1	Jonathan Smith (GBR)	0	1
1	Charles Strode (USA)	0	1
1	Morris Strode (USA)	0	1
1	Peter Svensson (SWE)	0	1
1	Gustavo Tiberti (ARG)	0	1
1	Magnus Tideman (SWE)	0	1
1	Jeff Turpin (USA)	0	1
1	John Van Nostrand (USA)	0	1
1	Jérôme Vanier (FRA)	0	1
1	Blaine Willenborg (USA)	0	1
1	Christoph Zipf (FRG)	0	1

=== Titles won by nation ===
Total	Nation	S	D
18	United States (USA)	7	11
5	Sweden (SWE)	3	2
4	Australia (AUS)	2	2
4	Chile (CHI)	2	2
4	Brazil (BRA)	1	3
3	Argentina (ARG)	2	1
3	Great Britain (GBR)	1	2
3	Nigeria (NGR)	1	2
3	West Germany (FRG)	0	3
2	Czechoslovakia (TCH)	2	0
2	Spain (ESP)	2	0
2	France (FRA)	1	1
2	Italy (ITA)	1	1
2	Mexico (MEX)	1	1
2	New Zealand (NZL)	1	1
2	South Africa (RSA)	1	1
2	Switzerland (SUI)	1	1
1	India (IND)	1	0
1	Paraguay (PAR)	1	0
1	Soviet Union (URS)	1	0
1	Denmark (DEN)	0	1
1	Puerto Rico (PUR)	0	1

== See also ==
- 1984 Grand Prix
- Association of Tennis Professionals
- International Tennis Federation
