= 1983 French Open – Mixed doubles =

Mixed doubles
- 1983 French Open

Final
- Champion: (United States) Barbara Jordan (United States) Eliot Teltscher
- Runner-up: (United States) Leslie Allen (United States) Charles Strode
- Score: 6–2, 6–3

Details
- Draw: 48

Events
Singles	men	women		boys	girls
Doubles	men	women	mixed	boys	girls
WC Singles	men	women	quad
WC Doubles	men	women	quad
Legends	−45	45+	women
- French Open

The mixed doubles tournament at the 1983 French Open was held from 23 May until 5 June 1983 on the outdoor clay courts at the Stade Roland Garros in Paris, France. Barbara Jordan and Eliot Teltscher won the title, defeating Leslie Allen and Charles Strode in the final.

== Draw ==
Key

- Q = Qualifier
- WC = Wild card
- LL = Lucky loser
- Alt = Alternate
- ITF = ITF entry
- PR = Protected ranking
- SR = Special ranking
- SE = Special exempt
- JE = Junior exempt
- JR = Junior Accelerator Programme entrant
- CO = College Accelerator Programme entrant
- NG = Next Gen Accelerator Program entrant
- w/o = Walkover
- r = Retired
- d = Defaulted

=== Finals ===
Quarterfinals
(United Kingdom) John Lloyd (Australia) Wendy Turnbull	6	3	6
(United States) Jimmy Brown (United States) Lisa Bonder	1	6	3
(United States) Eliot Teltscher (United States) Barbara Jordan	7	6
(Chile) Jaime Fillol (United States) Zina Garrison	6	1
(United States) Charles Strode (United States) Leslie Allen	5	6	2
(United States) Jimmy Arias (Canada) Carling Bassett	7	4	3^{r}
(Australia) Fred Stolle (United States) Pam Teeguarden	4	2
(United States) Mike Estep (United States) Paula Smith	6	6

Semifinals
(United Kingdom) John Lloyd (Australia) Wendy Turnbull	6	2	3
(United States) Eliot Teltscher (United States) Barbara Jordan	4	6	6
(United States) Charles Strode (United States) Leslie Allen	6	6
(United States) Mike Estep (United States) Paula Smith	2	3

Final
(United States) Eliot Teltscher (United States) Barbara Jordan	6	6
(United States) Charles Strode (United States) Leslie Allen	2	3

=== Top half ===
==== Section 1 ====
First round
(United Kingdom) J Lloyd (Australia) W Turnbull	6	7
(Argentina) E Giussani (Argentina) L Giussani	1	6
(France) J Vanier (France) C Vanier	1	3
(Australia) L Warder (Australia) A Minter	6	6
(Chile) A Fillol (Italy) R Reggi	6	2	6
(France) T Benhabiles (France) C Suire	4	6	3
(France) L Courteau (Chile) G Ohaco	0	4
(United States) J Brown (United States) L Bonder	6	6

Second round
(United Kingdom) J Lloyd (Australia) W Turnbull	6	6
(Canada) J Brabenec (Romania) M Romanov	0	3
(Australia) L Warder (Australia) A Minter	6	7
(Australia) P Smylie (Australia) E Sayers	1	5
(United States) D Ralston (Netherlands) B Stöve	3	2
(Chile) A Fillol (Italy) R Reggi	6	6
(United States) J Brown (United States) L Bonder	6	3	6
(France) J Hervet (France) D Beillan	4	6	2

Third round
(United Kingdom) J Lloyd (Australia) W Turnbull	2	6	6
(Australia) L Warder (Australia) A Minter	6	4	3
(Chile) A Fillol (Italy) R Reggi	1	6
(United States) J Brown (United States) L Bonder	6	7

Quarterfinals
(United Kingdom) J Lloyd (Australia) W Turnbull	6	3	6
(United States) J Brown (United States) L Bonder	1	6	3

==== Section 2 ====
First round
(United States) E Teltscher (United States) B Jordan	6	5	6
(Brazil) J Góes (United States) L Forood	4	7	0
(United States) R Crowley (United States) A White	6	6
(Argentina) A Ganzábal (Argentina) E Longo	3	3
(Australia) S Myers (France) C Tanvier	6	4	8
(United States) A Krickstein (United States) M Werdel	4	6	6
(Chile) I Camus (United States) M-L Piatek	6	6
(Brazil) J Soares (United States) M Torres	3	4

Second round
(United States) E Teltscher (United States) B Jordan	7	6
(Argentina) G Tiberti (Italy) P Murgo	6	0
(Ecuador) R Ycaza (United States) P Casale	7	6
(United States) R Crowley (United States) A White	6	2
(Chile) J Fillol (United States) Z Garrison	6	6
(Australia) S Myers (France) C Tanvier	2	3
(Peru) P Arraya (Peru) L Arraya	6	6	7
(Chile) I Camus (United States) M-L Piatek	2	7	5

Third round
(United States) E Teltscher (United States) B Jordan	6	6	6
(Ecuador) R Ycaza (United States) P Casale	4	7	4
(Chile) J Fillol (United States) Z Garrison	4	6	6
(Peru) P Arraya (Peru) L Arraya	6	2	4

Quarterfinals
(United States) E Teltscher (United States) B Jordan	7	6
(Chile) J Fillol (United States) Z Garrison	6	1

=== Bottom half ===
==== Section 3 ====
First round
(France) J-L Haillet (France) S Amiach	1	5
(Romania) F Segărceanu (Romania) L Romanov	6	7
(Brazil) G Barbosa (Brazil) P Medrado	5	6	7
(United States) C Strode (United States) L Allen	6	5	9
(United States) M Strode (United States) S Collins	5	6	6
(South Africa) B Levine (United States) J Filkoff	7	3	3
(Romania) I Năstase (Bulgaria) M Maleeva	2	4
(United States) J Arias (Canada) C Bassett	6	6

Second round
(Romania) F Segărceanu (Romania) L Romanov	6	7
(Romania) A Dîrzu (Romania) F Mihai	4	6
(United States) C Strode (United States) L Allen	7	7
(United States) M De Palmer (United States) C Reynolds	5	6
(United States) M Strode (United States) S Collins	6	6
(Argentina) C Castellan (Peru) P Vásquez	1	2
(United States) E Amend (United States) B Herr	6	4	4
(United States) J Arias (Canada) C Bassett	2	6	6

Third round
(Romania) F Segărceanu (Romania) L Romanov	3	6	1
(United States) C Strode (United States) L Allen	6	3	6
(United States) M Strode (United States) S Collins	6	1	3
(United States) J Arias (Canada) C Bassett	4	6	6

Quarterfinals
(United States) C Strode (United States) L Allen	5	6	2
(United States) J Arias (Canada) C Bassett	7	4	3^{r}

==== Section 4 ====
First round
(Brazil) C Motta (United States) B Nagelsen	6	7
(New Zealand) J Simpson (United States) B Bramblett	1	6
(Uruguay) D Pérez (France) I Crudo	0	1
(Australia) F Stolle (United States) P Teeguarden	6	6
(Australia) D Graham (Australia) A Tobin	6	6
(South Africa) R Moore (United States) T Phelps	2	4
(France) F Errard (France) N Phan-Thanh	2	3
(United States) B Foxworth (France) N Herreman	6	6

Second round
(France) D Naegelen (West Germany) E Pfaff	6	7
(Brazil) C Motta (United States) B Nagelsen	1	6
(Brazil) N Keller (United States) C Benjamin	2	4
(Australia) F Stolle (United States) P Teeguarden	6	6
(Australia) D Graham (Australia) A Tobin	4	3
(United States) M Estep (United States) P Smith	6	6
(United States) B Foxworth (France) N Herreman	5	6	1
(United States) S Stewart (United States) J Russell	7	3	6

Third round
(France) D Naegelen (West Germany) E Pfaff	3	3
(Australia) F Stolle (United States) P Teeguarden	6	6
(United States) M Estep (United States) P Smith	2	7	6
(United States) S Stewart (United States) J Russell	6	6	4

Quarterfinals
(Australia) F Stolle (United States) P Teeguarden	4	2
(United States) M Estep (United States) P Smith	6	6
