= Lagos Open =

Lagos Open may refer to:

- Lagos Open (1976–1991)
- Lagos Open (2000–present)
