= Iván Camus =

Chilean tennis player

- Full name: Iván Camus Cáceres
- Country (sports): Chile
- Born: 1 February 1963 (age 62)
- Plays: Right-handed

Singles
- Career record: 0–1
- Career titles: 0
- Highest ranking: No. 267 (January 3, 1983)

Doubles
- Career record: 5–11
- Career titles: 0
- Highest ranking: No. 144 (January 2, 1984)

Grand Slam doubles results
- French Open: 1R (1982, 1983)

Mixed doubles

Grand Slam mixed doubles results
- French Open: 2R (1983)

Iván Camus Cáceres (born 1 February 1963) is a former professional tennis player from Chile.

== Biography ==
Camus specialised in doubles and made only one Grand Prix appearance as a singles player, at the 1981 Chilean Open. He lost in the first round to Sergio Casal, a Spaniard who he partnered with to make his only Grand Prix final, the Aix-en-Provence Open in 1983.

All of his Grand Slam appearances were at the French Open. He first played in the 1982 French Open, with Gabriel Urpí in the men's doubles, for an opening round exit. At the 1983 French Open he featured in both the men's and mixed doubles draws. In the men's doubles he and partner Ricardo Acuña lost in the first round to the fourth seeds, but he reached the second round in the mixed doubles, with American Mary-Lou Piatek.

He won two Challenger titles, both on the clay courts of Italy, in Parioli in 1982 and Brescia in 1983.

== Grand Prix career finals ==
=== Doubles: 1 (0–1) ===
Result	No.	Date	Tournament	Surface	Partner	Opponents	Score
Loss	1.	1983	Aix-en-Provence, France	Clay	(Spain) Sergio Casal	(France) Henri Leconte (France) Gilles Moretton	6–2, 1–6, 2–6

== Challenger titles ==
=== Doubles: (2) ===
No.	Year	Tournament	Surface	Partner	Opponents	Score
1.	1982	Parioli, Italy	Clay	(Spain) Gabriel Urpí	(Argentina) Guillermo Aubone (Peru) Fernando Maynetto	3–6, 6–4, 6–3
2.	1983	Brescia, Italy	Clay	(Ecuador) Raúl Viver	(Brazil) Dácio Campos (Brazil) Eduardo Oncins	6–2, 5–7, 6–4
