= Wesley Cash =

American tennis player

- Country (sports): United States
- Plays: Right-handed

Singles
- Highest ranking: No. 490 (Jan 3, 1983)

Doubles
- Highest ranking: No. 272 (Jan 2, 1984)

Wesley Cash is an American former professional tennis player.

Cash, a native of Chattanooga, was undefeated in his four years at Baylor School and played collegiate tennis for the University of Georgia. He was a three-time All-SEC during his time at Georgia and played in three SEC championship teams. On the professional tour he won a Challenger tournament in 1983, partnering John Mattke in the doubles.

== ATP Challenger titles ==
=== Doubles: (1) ===
No.	Date	Tournament	Surface	Partner	Opponents	Score
1.	Feb 1983	Lagos Challenger; Lagos, Nigeria	Hard	(United States) John Mattke	(United States) Jonathan Canter (United States) Joe Meyers	6–3, 3–6, 6–3
