= Hans-Peter Kandler =

Austrian tennis player

- Full name: Hans-Peter Kandler
- Country (sports): Austria
- Born: 2 April 1956 (age 68); Mödling, Austria
- Plays: Right-handed
- Prize money: $48,938

Singles
- Career record: 5–21
- Career titles: 0
- Highest ranking: No. 136 (3 March 1986)

Doubles
- Career record: 2–12
- Career titles: 0
- Highest ranking: No. 256 (2 January 1984)

Hans-Peter Kandler (born 2 April 1956) is a former professional tennis player from Austria.

== Biography ==
Kandler was born in Mödling, a town near Vienna. He competed professionally on the Grand Prix tour in the 1980s and represented Austria in two Davis Cup ties in 1982.

Both of his Davis Cup appearances came in 1982, the first a Europe Zone quarter-final tie at home against Algeria, in which Kandler won two singles matches to help Austria secure a 5–0 whitewash. He played again in the semi-final against Switzerland at Werzer Stadium in Portschach. Once more he was used in two singles rubbers, and on this occasion lost both, to Roland Stadler and then Heinz Günthardt.

On the Grand Prix tour he won a total of five singles matches and made it to 136 in the world. He suffered an unusual injury at the 1985 Tournament of Champions in Forest Hills while partnering with Fernando Luna in the first round of the doubles draw against top seeds Ken Flach and Robert Seguso. In the opening game of the match, he was positioning himself for an overhead shot when he ran into the box under the center line judge's chair. His left leg struck the edge of the box and caused a large laceration, deep enough to expose the tibia. Following an examination by the tournament physician, he was forced to default the match and was treated in hospital.

Kandler won the Kaduna Challenger tournament in 1985.

He has a daughter Christine who competed on the WTA Tour.

== Challenger titles ==
=== Singles: (1) ===
No.	Year	Tournament	Surface	Opponent	Score
1.	1985	Kaduna, Nigeria	Clay	(Mexico) Alfonso González	2–6, 6–4, 6–0

== See also ==
- List of Austria Davis Cup team representatives
