= Joel Bailey (tennis) =

American tennis player

- Full name: Joel Bailey
- Country (sports): United States
- Born: April 25, 1951 (age 74) West Palm Beach, Florida
- Plays: Right-handed

Singles
- Career record: 7–34
- Career titles: 0
- Highest ranking: No. 197 (December 31, 1978)

Grand Slam singles results
- Wimbledon: 1R (1978, 1981)
- US Open: 2R (1979)

Doubles
- Career record: 28–55
- Career titles: 1
- Highest ranking: No. 90 (September 24, 1979)

Grand Slam doubles results
- Australian Open: 2R (1981)
- French Open: 1R (1978)
- Wimbledon: 2R (1978)
- US Open: 1R (1977, 1979, 1981)

Joel Bailey (born April 25, 1951) is a former professional tennis player from the United States.

== Biography ==
Bailey was born in Florida but based in Memphis, Tennessee. An All-American varsity tennis player at Samford University, Bailey began competing internationally in the late 1970s.

He won a Grand Prix doubles title in Lagos, Nigeria with Bruce Kleege in 1979.

In singles, he had his first big match win at Sarasota in 1980 when he saved triple match points to upset Steve Krulevitz, from a set and 2–5 down. He had only entered the tournament as a wild card, which was awarded as he was the son of Mack Bailey, who owned the company that sponsored the tournament. At the Tulsa that year he made the quarter-finals, his best performance in a Grand Prix tournament. He competed in the main draw of the 1981 Wimbledon Championships and had a two set lead over Kevin Curren in their first round encounter, but lost in five.

From the 1980s he lived in Japan and appeared in many tournaments in that country, as well as earning a living teaching tennis. He twice won the doubles title at the ATP Challenger event in Nagoya.

== Grand Prix career finals ==
=== Doubles: 1 (1–0) ===
Result	W/L	Date	Tournament	Surface	Partner	Opponents	Score
Win	1–0	Mar 1979	Lagos, Nigeria	Hard	(United States) Bruce Kleege	(Egypt) Ismail El Shafei (Austria) Peter Feigl	6–4, 6–7, 6–3

== Challenger titles ==
=== Doubles: (3) ===
No.	Year	Tournament	Surface	Partner	Opponents	Score
1.	1979	Nagoya, Japan	Hard	(Australia) Rod Frawley	(Australia) Chris Kachel (Mexico) Marcello Lara	7–6, 7–5
2.	1979	Lincoln, U.S.	Hard	(United States) Bruce Kleege	(United States) Steve Denton (United States) Peter Rennert	0–6, 6–4, 6–4
3.	1983	Nagoya, Japan	Hard	(United States) Jeff Turpin	(United States) Charles Strode (United States) Morris Strode	6–4, 3–6, 7–6
