= Mike Barr (tennis) =

American tennis player

- Country (sports): United States
- Born: June 27, 1956 (age 68); Highland Park, Illinois, U.S.

Singles
- Career record: 0–4
- Highest ranking: No. 249 (January 2, 1984)

Grand Slam singles results
- Australian Open: 1R (1982)

Doubles
- Career record: 1–8
- Highest ranking: No. 212 (January 2, 1984)

Grand Slam doubles results
- French Open: 1R (1980)

Mike Barr (born June 27, 1956) is an American former professional tennis player.

Barr grew up near Chicago in Highland Park, Illinois and played college tennis for the University of Wisconsin–Madison, from 1975 to 1978. He served as team captain in his senior year.

While competing on the professional tour he reached a career high singles ranking of 249 in the world. He featured in the men's doubles main draw at the 1980 French Open and singles main draw at the 1982 Australian Open. His best doubles ranking was 212 and he won three doubles titles on the ATP Challenger Tour.

== Challenger titles ==
=== Doubles: (3) ===
No.	Year	Tournament	Surface	Partner	Opponents	Score
1.	1979	Charlotte, United States	Clay	(United States) Jerry Karzen	(United States) John Benson (United States) Tony Giammalva	6–3, 4–6, 7–6
2.	1980	San Luis Potosí, Mexico	Clay	(Canada) Réjean Genois	(Bolivia) Ramiro Benavides (Spain) Gabriel Urpí	6–4, 6–4
3.	1983	Kaduna, Nigeria	Clay	(Switzerland) Jakob Hlasek	(Austria) Bernhard Pils (Austria) Helmar Stiegler	6–4, 6–1
