= Aix-en-Provence Open =

Defunct tennis tournament
- Event name: Aix-en-Provence Open
- Tour: Grand Prix circuit (1977–84)
- Founded: 1955; 70 years ago
- Abolished: 1984; 41 years ago
- Editions: 23
- Location: Country Club Aixois, Aix-en-Provence, France
- Surface: Clay / outdoor

The Aix-en-Provence Open was a combined men's and women's clay court tennis tournament founded in 1955 as the La Trophée Raquette d'Or or The Golden Racket Trophy and originally staged at the Tennis Club Aixois, then later Country Club Aixois, Aix-en-Provence, France.

== History ==
In July 1955 the first Trophée Raquette d'Or was held at the Tennis Club Aixois (TCA) and played across 5 clay courts was a men's event. In 1956 a women's event was staged for the first time. In 1962 Tennis Club Aixois had been expanded to the point it became a country club and was renamed as the Country Club Aixois. The men's event ran until 1974 then was not staged for the next two years until 1977 through to 1978 when the Aix-en-Provence Golden Racket ended. The women's event also ran until 1974.

In 1984 the men's event was resestablished as Aix-en-Provence Open a Grand Prix circuit event for two editions only until 1985. In 1988 the women's event was reestablished at the same venue as the WTA Aix-en-Provence Open a WTA Category 4 tournament for one edition only.

From 1985 until 2002 the Country Club Aixois did not stage anymore senior tour level tennis events. In 2003 a men's challenger event was resestablished at the venue called the Open Sainte-Victoire which ran until 2005. The club once again ceased to stage events until 2014 when it was chosen to host a new Challenger event called the Open du Pays d'Aix which is still operating today.

== Finals ==
=== Men's singles ===
Incomplete Roll

Year	Winners	Runners-up	Score
Golden Racket Trophy
1955	(Italy) Sergio Jacobini	(Spain) Emilio Martinez Del Rey	6–4, 6–4, 6–3
1956	(France) Paul Rémy	(Australia) Bob Howe	6–1, 6–4, 6–2
1957	(United States) Budge Patty	(United States) Gardnar Mulloy	2–6, 6–1, 6–0
1958	(Czechoslovakia) Jaroslav Drobný	(United States) Budge Patty	6-4, 6-4
1959	(United States) Gardnar Mulloy	(Belgium) Jacques Brichant	3–6, 6–0, 6–0, 6–4
1960	(France) Gérard Pilet	(United States) Gardnar Mulloy	12–10, 6–2, 6-1
1961	(France) Pierre Darmon	(South Africa) Robin F. Sanders	6–1, 6–1, ret.
1962	(United States) Ed Rubinoff	(South Africa) Keith Diepraam	6–1, 6–2, 6–1
1963	(West Germany) Ingo Buding	(Australia) John Fraser	6–3, 3–6, 6–1, 4–6, 6–3
1964	(France) Pierre Darmon (2)	(Australia) Martin Mulligan	6–4, 6–2, 6–1
1965	(Australia) Ken Fletcher	(France) Michel Leclercq	6–1, 6–2, 6–3
1966	(Hungary) István Gulyás	(Canada) Mike Belkin	6–4, 4–6, 6–0, 6–1
1967	(Soviet Union) Alex Metreveli	(Czechoslovakia) Jan Kodeš	4–6, 6–4, 6–2, 6–2
1968	(France) Pierre Darmon (3)	(France) Daniel Contet	7–5, 6–1, 8–6
↓ Open era ↓
1969	(Australia) Roy Emerson	(West Germany) Harald Elschenbroich	6–3, 6–4, 8–6
1970	(France) François Jauffret	(France) Daniel Contet	6–1, 3–6, 6–2, 7–5
1971	(Greece) Nicholas Kalogeropoulos	(France) Patrice Dominguez	7–5, 2–6, 6–2, 4–6, 6–4
1972	Not held		
1973	(Australia) Martin Mulligan	(Argentina) Julián Ganzábal	5–7, 0–6, 6–2, 6–3, 6–4
1974	(Greece) Nicholas Kalogeropoulos (2)	(France) Patrice Dominguez	2–6, 7–5, 6–2, 2–6, 6–3
1975–76	Not held		
1977	(Romania) Ilie Năstase	(Argentina) Guillermo Vilas	6–1, 7–5 (Vilas retired)
1978	(Argentina) Guillermo Vilas	(Argentina) José Luis Clerc	6–3, 6–0, 6–3
1979	Not held		
Aix-en-Provence Open
1983	(Sweden) Mats Wilander	(Spain) Sergio Casal	6–3, 6–2
1984	(Spain) Juan Aguilera	(Spain) Fernando Luna	6–4, 7–5

=== Men's doubles ===
Year	Winners	Runners-up	Score
1977	(Romania) Ilie Năstase (Romania) Ion Țiriac	(France) Patrice Dominguez (Sweden) Rolf Norberg	7–5, 7–6
1978	(Romania) Ion Țiriac (Argentina) Guillermo Vilas	(Czechoslovakia) Jan Kodeš (Czechoslovakia) Tomáš Šmíd	7–6, 6–1
1979–82	Not held		
1983	(France) Henri Leconte (France) Gilles Moretton	(Chile) Iván Camus (Spain) Sergio Casal	2–6, 6–1, 6–2
1984	(Australia) Pat Cash (Australia) Paul McNamee	(New Zealand) Chris Lewis (Australia) Wally Masur	4–6, 6–3, 6–4

=== Women's singles ===
Incomplete Roll

Year	Winners	Runners-up	Score
Golden Racket Trophy
1956	(United Kingdom) Joan Curry	(United States) Louise Snow	6-3, 6-3
1957	(Belgium) Christiane Mercelis	(United Kingdom) Pat Ward	1–6, 6–3, 6–1
1958	(Hungary) Suzy Kormoczy	(Mexico) Yola Ramírez	6-4, 7-5
1959	(Mexico) Yola Ramírez	(France) Flo De La Courtie	7-5, 6-1
1960	(West Germany) Edda Buding	(New Zealand) Ruia Morrison	6-4, 8-6
1961	(Australia) Margaret Smith	(United Kingdom) Elizabeth Starkie	6-2, 6-3
1962	(Australia) Jill Blackman	(Belgium) Christiane Mercelis	6-4, 6-3
1963	(Australia) Lesley Turner	(Australia) Jan Lehane	5–7, 6–4, 6–3
1964	(Australia) Jan Lehane	(Australia) Madonna Schacht	6-1, 6-0
1965	(Australia) Robin Lesh	(Czechoslovakia) Jitka Volavková	3–6, 6–4, 6–4
1966	(France) Françoise Dürr	(Australia) Jill Blackman	6-0, 6-2
1967	(Australia) Gail Sherriff	(Australia) Joan Gibson Cottrill	7-5, 13-11
1968	(Australia) Gail Sherriff Chanfreau (2)	(France) Rosie Reyes Darmon	6-3, 6-1
↓ Open era ↓
1969	(United Kingdom) Ann Haydon-Jones	(France) Françoise Dürr	6–1, 6–1
1970	(Uruguay) Fiorella Bonicelli	(France) Odile de Roubin	11-9, 4-6, 6-1
1971	(Uruguay) Fiorella Bonicelli (2)	(France) Odile de Roubin	6–2, 5–7, 8–6
1972	Not held		
1973	(France) A.M. Ganzabal	(France) Miss Seagalen	6-3, 6-4
1974	(France) Gail Sherriff Chanfreau (3)	(France) Odile de Roubin	6-4, 6-3
1975–87	Not held		
For the 1988 event see WTA Aix-en-Provence Open
