= Helmar Stiegler =

- Country (sports): Austria
- Born: 18 March 1960 (age 65); Vienna, Austria
- Height: 5 ft 11 in (180 cm)
- Plays: Left-handed
- Prize money: $17,781

Singles
- Career record: 2–12
- Highest ranking: No. 224 (4 Jan 1981)

Grand Slam singles results
- Australian Open: Q2 (1979)

Doubles
- Career record: 1–4
- Highest ranking: No. 433 (6 Nov 1984)

Helmar Stiegler (born 18 March 1960) is an Austrian former professional tennis player.

A left-handed player from Vienna, Stiegler reached a best singles world ranking of 224 during his time on the professional tour. In 1980 he made the round of 16 at Grand Prix tournaments in Vienna and Sofia.

Stiegler is now an orthopedic surgeon.

== ATP Challenger finals ==
=== Doubles: 3 (0–3) ===
Result	No.	Date	Tournament	Surface	Partner	Opponents	Score
Loss	1.	Mar 1980	Linz, Austria	Hard	(Austria) Robert Reininger	(United States) Tony Graham (Chile) Belus Prajoux	2–6, 6–4, 5–7
Loss	2.	Feb 1982	Nairobi, Kenya	Clay	(Austria) Bernhard Pils	(United States) Drew Gitlin (Czechoslovakia) Jan Kodeš	4–6, 6–3, 3–6
Loss	3.	Feb 1983	Kaduna, Nigeria	Clay	(Austria) Bernhard Pils	(United States) Mike Barr (Switzerland) Jakob Hlasek	4–6, 1–6
