= Jacques Hervet =

French tennis player and coach

- Country (sports): France
- Born: 25 February 1961 (age 64); Oran, Algeria
- Height: 5 ft 11 in (180 cm)
- Plays: Right-handed

Singles
- Career record: 0–1
- Highest ranking: No. 227 (2 Jan 1984)

Grand Slam singles results
- French Open: 1R (1983)

Doubles
- Career record: 0–1
- Highest ranking: No. 159 (23 Jul 1984)

Grand Slam mixed doubles results
- French Open: 2R (1983)

Jacques Hervet (born 25 February 1961) is a French tennis coach and former professional player.

Hervet featured as a qualifier in the singles main draw of the 1983 French Open, where he was beaten in the first round by former champion Ilie Năstase. He also competed in the mixed doubles event, as the partner of Dominique Beillan.

== Challenger titles ==
=== Doubles: (1) ===
No.	Date	Tournament	Surface	Partner	Opponents	Score
1.	11 June 1984	Brescia, Italy	Clay	(France) Jérôme Vanier	(Argentina) Alejandro Ganzábal (Argentina) Carlos Gattiker	7–5, 2–6, 6–4
