= Ivan Dupasquier =

Swiss tennis player

- Country (sports): Switzerland
- Born: 23 November 1961 (age 63); Neuchâtel, Switzerland
- Plays: Right-handed

Singles
- Career record: 14–29
- Career titles: 0
- Highest ranking: No. 122 (4 January 1982)

Grand Slam singles results
- US Open: 1R (1981)

Doubles
- Career record: 7–27
- Career titles: 0
- Highest ranking: No. 251 (3 January 1983)

Grand Slam doubles results
- French Open: 1R (1982)

Ivan Dupasquier (born 23 November 1961) is a former professional tennis player from Switzerland.

== Career ==
Dupasquier made his Davis Cup debut in 1980, when he lost a dead rubber singles match to Italy's Gianni Ocleppo. His next match, which he won, was against Mexican Juan Hernández the following year. In 1982 he won a singles rubber over Mohammed Dlimi of Morocco, to finish with a 2-1 Davis Cup career record.

The Swiss player was granted "special exempt status" by the organisers of the 1981 US Open. This was because he was busy playing a Davis Cup tie during qualifying and meant that he would go straight into the main draw. He lost to Mark Edmondson in the opening round. Also that year he reached the quarter-finals of the Taipei Grand Prix tournament and was a losing finalist in Manila.

He completed in the men's doubles draw of a Grand Slam event on one occasion, which was at the 1982 French Open, where he partnered Christophe Roger-Vasselin. They didn't make it past the first round.

== Grand Prix career finals ==
=== Singles: 1 (0–1) ===
Result	W/L	Date	Tournament	Surface	Opponent	Score
Loss	0–1	Nov 1981	Manila, Philippines	Clay	(India) Ramesh Krishnan	4–6, 4–6
