= Ernesto Vázquez (tennis) =

Spanish tennis player (born 1953)

- Full name: Ernesto Vázquez Barreira
- Country (sports): Spain
- Born: November 5, 1953 (age 71); Vigo, Spain
- Plays: Right-handed

Singles
- Career record: 2–11
- Career titles: 0
- Highest ranking: No. 102 (23 August 1973)

Doubles
- Career record: 0–2
- Career titles: 0
- Highest ranking: No. 703 (20 May 1985)
Medal record
Mediterranean Games
Bronze medal – third place	1979 Split	Singles
- Last updated on: January 26, 2020.

Ernesto Vázquez Barreira (Note: In this Spanish name, the first or paternal surname is Vázquez and the second or maternal family name is Barreira.) (born November 5, 1953) is a former Spanish tennis player who a bronze medal at the 1979 Mediterranean Games.
