= Lagos Open (1976–1991) =

Defunct tennis tournament
- Event name: Lagos WCT (1976); Lagos Open (1978–80); Lagos Challenger(1981, 1983, 1985–87, 1989, 1991)
- Tour: WCT circuit (1976); Grand Prix circuit (1978–80); Challenger circuit (1981, 1983, 1985–87, 1989, 1991)
- Founded: 1976
- Abolished: 1991
- Location: Lagos, Nigeria
- Surface: Clay (1976, 1978–80); Hard (1981, 1983, 1985–87, 1989, 1991)

The Lagos Open is a defunct WCT, Grand Prix and Challenger affiliated tennis tournament played from 1976 to 1991. It was held in Lagos in Nigeria and played on outdoor clay courts from 1976 to 1980, then on outdoor hard courts from 1981 to 1991.

Nduka Odizor and Paul Haarhuis were the most successful players at the event, each winning the singles competition twice.

== Results ==
=== Singles ===
Year	Champions	Runners-up	Score
1976	(United States) Dick Stockton	(United States) Arthur Ashe	6–3, 6–2
1977	Not held		
1978	(Sweden) Kjell Johansson	(United Kingdom) Robin Drysdale	9–8, 6–3
1979	(Austria) Hans Kary	(Austria) Peter Feigl	6–4, 3–6, 6–2
1980	(Austria) Peter Feigl	(Canada) Harry Fritz	6–2, 6–3, 6–2
1981	(United States) Larry Stefanki	(Austria) Peter Feigl	5–7, 6–3, 6–0
1982	Not held		
1983	(United States) Craig Wittus	(Netherlands) Michiel Schapers	6–3, 4–6, 11–9
1984	Not held		
1985	(Nigeria) Nduka Odizor	(Austria) Thomas Muster	6–3, 6–2
1986	(Nigeria) Nduka Odizor	(United States) Marcel Freeman	6–2, 6–3
1987	(Mexico) Jorge Lozano	(Nigeria) Nduka Odizor	6–4, 6–4
1988	Not held		
1989	(Netherlands) Paul Haarhuis	(Czechoslovakia) Karel Nováček	4–6, 7–6, 6–4
1990	Not held		
1991	(Netherlands) Paul Haarhuis	(United States) T. J. Middleton	6–3, 6–3

=== Doubles ===
Year	Champions	Runners-up	Score
1976	Not completed		
1977	Not held		
1978	(United States) George Hardie (India) Sashi Menon	(United Kingdom) Colin Dowdeswell (West Germany) Jürgen Fassbender	6–3, 3–6, 7–5
1979	(United States) Joel Bailey (United States) Bruce Kleege	(Egypt) Ismail El Shafei (Austria) Peter Feigl	6–4, 6–7, 6–3
1980	(United States) Tony Graham (United States) Bruce Nichols	(Sweden) Kjell Johansson (Finland) Leo Palin	6–3, 0–6, 6–3
1981	(United States) Bruce Kleege (United States) Larry Stefanki	(United States) Ian Harris (United States) Craig Wittus	6–2, 3–6, 6–3
1982	Not held		
1983	(United States) Wesley Cash (United States) John Mattke	(United States) Jonathan Canter (United States) Joe Meyers	6–3, 3–6, 6–3
1984	Not held		
1985	(United States) Egan Adams (United States) Mark Wooldridge	(West Germany) Peter Elter (Austria) Peter Feigl	6–4, 6–4
1986	(Finland) Leo Palin (Finland) Olli Rahnasto	(United States) Lloyd Bourne (United States) Brett Dickinson	4–6, 7–6, 6–4
1987	(United States) Lloyd Bourne (United States) Jeff Klaparda	(France) Loïc Courteau (France) Eric Winogradsky	6–7, 6–2, 7–6
1988	Not held		
1989	(Venezuela) Alfonso Mora (United States) James Schor	(Netherlands) Jacco Eltingh (Netherlands) Paul Haarhuis	6–7, 7–6, 7–5
1990	Not held		
1991	(Italy) Ugo Colombini (Kenya) Paul Wekesa	(Spain) Daniel Marco (Ivory Coast) Clement N'Goran	7–5, 6–1

== Event names ==
Official

- Lagos Tennis Classic (1976–1980)
- Lagos Open (1981)
- Lagos Challenger (1983, 1985–87, 1989, 1991)

Tour

- WCT Lagos (1976)

Sponsered

- Lord Rummens Classic (1976)
- Dunlop-NTC Classic (1978-1980)
- Lord Rumens Classic (1981-1991)
