= Brian Levine =

South African tennis player

- Country (sports): South Africa
- Born: 20 August 1958 (age 67) Cape Town, South Africa
- Height: 1.83 m (6 ft 0 in)
- Turned pro: 1982
- Plays: Right-handed

Singles
- Career record: 5–11
- Highest ranking: No. 180 (19 November 1984)

Grand Slam singles results
- Wimbledon: 1R (1986)

Doubles
- Career record: 37–56
- Career titles: 2
- Highest ranking: No. 44 (24 March 1986)

Grand Slam doubles results
- Wimbledon: 3R (1985)

Grand Slam mixed doubles results
- Wimbledon: 2R (1985)

Brian Levine (born 20 August 1958) is a former South African tennis player who played professional tennis from 1982 to 1988.

== Career ==
In his career, Levine played in 24 Grand Slams (French Open, Wimbledon, US Open & Australian Open). Levine's first major grand slam was Wimbledon in 1983 where he qualified for the doubles with an 18-year-old Stefan Edberg. Levine competed in over 200 tournaments worldwide on the ATP Tour.

Levine won two doubles titles during his professional career. He reached his highest doubles ATP ranking on 24 March 1986 when he became the number 44 in the world. He won the singles title at the 1984 West Australian Open, a tournament on the Challenger Series held in Perth.

== Career finals ==
=== Doubles (2 titles, 2 runner-ups) ===
Result	W/L	Date	Tournament	Surface	Partner	Opponents	Score
Win	1–0	Jan 1984	Auckland, New Zealand	Hard	(United States) John Van Nostrand	(Australia) Brad Drewett (United States) Chip Hooper	7–5, 6–2
Win	2–0	Sep 1984	Tel Aviv, Israel	Hard	(Australia) Peter Doohan	(United Kingdom) Colin Dowdeswell (Switzerland) Jakob Hlasek	6–3, 6–4
Loss	2–1	Dec 1984	Adelaide, Australia	Grass	(Australia) Peter Doohan	(Australia) Broderick Dyke (Australia) Wally Masur	6–4, 5–7, 1–6
Loss	2–2	Mar 1986	Milan, Italy	Carpet	(Australia) Laurie Warder	(United Kingdom) Colin Dowdeswell (South Africa) Christo Steyn	3–6, 6–4, 1–6

== See also ==
- Brian Robbins
