= Henri de Wet =

South African tennis player

- Full name: Henri de Wet
- Country (sports): South Africa
- Born: 1 March 1962 (age 63); Klerksdorp, South Africa
- Height: 188 cm (6 ft 2 in)
- Plays: Right-handed
- Prize money: $18,254

Singles
- Career record: 0–4
- Highest ranking: No. 181 (6 August 1984)

Doubles
- Career record: 0–1
- Highest ranking: No. 167 (13 August 1984)

Henri de Wet (born 1 March 1962) is a former professional tennis player from South Africa.

== Biography ==
Born in Klerksdorp, de Wet attended college in the United States in the early 1980s, at the University of Miami. He played on the same tennis team at the University of Miami as countryman Christo Steyn. In 1983 he turned professional and won a Challenger title that year in Vigo, Spain. In addition to two Grand Prix main draw appearances in Johannesburg, de Wet also appeared at the Austrian Open Kitzbühel in 1984 and the 1985 Cincinnati Open. At the Bloemfontein Challenger tournament in 1987 he had a win over future world number one Jim Courier.

Having immigrated to Germany, he now lives in Düsseldorf.

== Challenger titles ==
=== Singles: (1) ===
Year	Tournament	Surface	Opponent	Score
1983	Vigo, Spain	Clay	(United States) Pender Murphy	1–6, 6–3, 6–3
