= Jeff Turpin =

American tennis player

- Full name: Jeff Turpin
- Country (sports): United States
- Born: May 13, 1960 (age 64); Dallas, Texas

Singles
- Career record: 8–13
- Career titles: 0
- Highest ranking: No. 138 (October 29, 1984)

Grand Slam singles results
- Australian Open: 1R (1984)
- Wimbledon: 1R (1983, 1984)

Doubles
- Career record: 19–32
- Career titles: 0
- Highest ranking: No. 81 (August 20, 1984)

Grand Slam doubles results
- Australian Open: 2R (1984)
- Wimbledon: 1R (1984, 1985)
- US Open: 2R (1983)

Jeff Turpin (born May 13, 1960) is a former professional tennis player from the United States.

== Biography ==
Turpin's father Jack, a businessman, was a collegiate player at Rice University and is a member of the Texas Tennis Hall of Fame. Jeff also has two brothers who were involved in tennis. Eldest brother Scott played for Rice University and middle brother Mark competed professionally.

A native of Dallas, Texas, Turpin graduated from St. Mark's School of Texas. As a high school senior in 1978, he won the USTA Interscholastic Tennis Championships in both singles and doubles (the latter win was with Brad Stoffel, a St. Mark's teammate). That summer, Turpin was runner-up to Ivan Lendl in the boys' singles at the 1978 Wimbledon Championships, which he followed up with a semi-final appearance in boys' singles at the 1978 US Open.

Turpin then attended Southern Methodist University, where he was an All-American varsity tennis player. Graduating with a business degree, Turpin turned professional in 1982.

During his professional tennis career he competed in the main draws of the Australian Open, Wimbledon Championships and US Open. He played singles twice at Wimbledon, in 1983 and 1984.

On the Grand Prix circuit he had his best performance in the 1984 Bristol Open, where he made the quarter-finals, with wins over Mike Leach, Emilio Sánchez and fourth seed John Fitzgerald. The tournament coincided with Wimbledon qualifying, so Turpin was often required to make the trip between London and Bristol to play two matches in a day. He played a total of 10 matches in six days. In doubles, he and Mike De Palmer had a good win at the 1984 Livingston Open, over the world's top-ranked doubles player Peter Fleming and his partner Fritz Buehning.

In 1986, Turpin retired from professional tennis and became president of T Bar M, a tennis club in Dallas. He left in 1996 to become president of oil and gas investment company, Hallmark Energy, a firm founded by his father, Jack Turpin.

He is married with three children: two daughters and a son.

== Challenger titles ==
=== Doubles: (2) ===
No.	Year	Tournament	Surface	Partner	Opponents	Score
1.	1983	Nagoya, Japan	Hard	(United States) Joel Bailey	(United States) Charles Strode (United States) Morris Strode	6–4, 3–6, 7–6
1.	1984	Ashkelon, Israel	Hard	(United States) Bruce Manson	(Finland) Leo Palin (Netherlands) Michiel Schapers	6–2, 6–2
