= Pender Murphy =

American tennis player

- Country (sports): United States
- Born: March 19, 1959 (age 66); Charlotte, North Carolina, U.S.
- Plays: Right-handed

Singles
- Career record: 8–16
- Highest ranking: No. 102 (July 5, 1982)

Grand Slam singles results
- French Open: 1R (1983)
- US Open: 1R (1982)

Doubles
- Career record: 1–8
- Highest ranking: No. 322 (January 2, 1984)

Pender Murphy (born March 19, 1959) is a former professional tennis player from United States.

Murphy grew up in Charlotte, North Carolina and attended Clemson University, where he earned All-American honors on three occasions.

Following his time at Clemson University he competed professionally for two years. His best result on the Grand Prix tour was a semi-final appearance at Venice in 1982, after which he reached a career best ranking of 102 in the world. He competed in the main draw of two Grand Slam tournaments, the 1982 US Open and 1983 French Open.
