= Mark Wooldridge =

American tennis player

- Full name: Mark Wooldridge
- Country (sports): United States
- Born: July 7, 1962 (age 62); Los Angeles, California
- Plays: Right-handed
- Prize money: $38,454

Singles
- Career record: 3–11
- Career titles: 0
- Highest ranking: No. 148 (February 25, 1985)

Grand Slam singles results
- Australian Open: 1R (1985)

Doubles
- Career record: 4–16
- Career titles: 0
- Highest ranking: No. 101 (July 8, 1985)

Grand Slam doubles results
- Australian Open: 1R (1985)
- US Open: 1R (1985)

Mark Wooldridge (born July 7, 1962) is a former professional tennis player from the United States.

== Biography ==
Wooldridge, the son of a physicist, comes from Santa Barbara in California.

He went to the University of California at Berkeley and played No. 2 singles, before joining the tour full-time in 1983 and playing professionally for four years. He won the men's singles in the Ojai Tennis Tournament in 1984.

At the 1985 US Open he competed in the main draw of the men's doubles with Egan Adams, who he also partnered with to win a Challenger tournament that year in Lagos. He made his only Grand Slam singles appearance at the 1985 Australian Open and was beaten in the first round by local player Brad Drewett. In the men's doubles he and partner Menno Oosting were defeated in the opening round.

Now living in Manhattan Beach, Wooldridge still plays competitive tennis, in over 50s events.

== Challenger titles ==
=== Doubles: (1) ===
Year	Tournament	Surface	Partner	Opponents	Score
1985	Lagos, Nigeria	Clay	(United States) Egan Adams	(West Germany) Peter Elter (Austria) Peter Feigl	6–4, 6–4
