= Bruce Kleege =

American tennis player

- Full name: Robert Bruce Kleege
- Country (sports): United States
- Born: November 1, 1954 (age 70); Frankfurt, West Germany
- Turned pro: 1977
- Retired: 1984
- Plays: Right-handed

Singles
- Career record: 10–35
- Career titles: 0
- Highest ranking: No. 148 (December 31, 1978)

Grand Slam singles results
- Australian Open: 3R (1982)
- Wimbledon: 1R (1983)
- US Open: 1R (1979, 1983)

Doubles
- Career record: 22–40
- Career titles: 1

Grand Slam doubles results
- Australian Open: 1R (1982)
- Wimbledon: 1R (1980)
- US Open: 2R (1979, 1982)

Robert Bruce Kleege (born November 1, 1954), known as Bruce Kleege, is a former professional tennis player from the United States.

== Biography ==
=== Early years and college ===
Kleege grew up in La Jolla, California, but was born in Frankfurt, West Germany. He is of Latvian descent through his father Robert, who worked at the time for the United Nations. After attending Clairemont High School, Kleege went to Brigham Young University from 1972 to 1977. He had a noted varsity tennis career, which culminated in winning the No. 1 singles conference championship in 1977, a year he went undefeated and ranked sixth nationally. For his efforts he was awarded All-American honors, in both singles and doubles. Graduating in 1977 with a business management degree, Kleege made the decision to turn professional and made his first appearance on the Grand Prix circuit at a doubles tournament in Basel in October 1977.

=== Professional career ===
Most of his singles matches in 1978 came in ATP Challenger events, but he made the main draw of the end of year Australian Open, in which he lost in the first round to Arthur Ashe, who was making his last appearance at the tournament. He started 1979 by winning the doubles title at the Lagos Open, a Grand Prix tournament, with Joel Bailey. A few weeks later he was a singles quarter-finalist in San Jose, Costa Rica. The following year his best performance was when he made the third round of the 1982 Australian Open. He suffered the disappointment of losing a five-and-a-half-hour match in the final round of qualifying for the 1983 Wimbledon Championships, to Tian Viljoen, 11–13 in the fifth set. However he got to enter the main draw when sixth seed Gene Mayer had to withdraw. Later in the year he had an upset win over world number 14 and top seed Steve Denton at the 1983 Hall of Fame Tennis Championships in Newport.

=== Later life ===
After leaving tennis he has been involved in real estate investment. He is married and in 2007 his wife gave birth to twin boys.

== Grand Prix career finals ==
=== Doubles: 1 (1–0) ===
Result	W/L	Date	Tournament	Surface	Partner	Opponents	Score
Win	1–0	Mar 1979	Lagos, Nigeria	Hard	(United States) Joel Bailey	(Egypt) Ismail El Shafei (Austria) Peter Feigl	6–4, 6–7, 6–3

== Challenger titles ==
=== Doubles: (2) ===
No.	Year	Tournament	Surface	Partner	Opponents	Score
1.	1979	Lincoln, U.S.	Hard	(United States) Joel Bailey	(United States) Steve Denton (United States) Peter Rennert	0–6, 6–4, 6–4
2.	1981	Lagos, Nigeria	Hard	(United States) Larry Stefanki	(United States) Ian Harris (United States) Craig Wittus	6–2, 3–6, 6–3
