= Gabriel Mattos =

Brazilian tennis player

- Country (sports): Brazil
- Born: 13 November 1957 (age 67)
- Prize money: $10,067

Singles
- Career record: 1–3
- Highest ranking: No. 347 (26 Dec 1979)

Doubles
- Career record: 0–1
- Highest ranking: No. 215 (2 Jan 1984)

Gabriel Mattos (born 13 November 1957) is a Brazilian former professional tennis player.

Mattos is originally from São Paulo and went to college in the United States. In 1978 he won the USTA national amateur clay court championships, as well as the Mid-Atlantic regional title. His professional performances included an ATP Challenger doubles title back in his native São Paulo in 1983. He had a best singles world ranking of 347.

== ATP Challenger titles ==
=== Doubles: (1) ===
No.	Date	Tournament	Surface	Partner	Opponents	Score
1.	Mar 1983	São Paulo Challenger, Brazil	Clay	(Hungary) Zoltán Kuhárszky	(Paraguay) Víctor Pecci (Uruguay) Hugo Roverano	6–2, 3–6, 6–3
