= Juan Hernández (tennis) =

Mexican tennis player

- Full name: Juan Hernández Salas
- Country (sports): Mexico

Singles
- Career record: 2–2
- Highest ranking: No. 275 (2 January 1984)

Doubles
- Career record: 1–3
- Highest ranking: No. 248 (3 January 1983)

Grand Slam doubles results
- French Open: 1R (1982)

Juan Hernández Salas (Note: In this Spanish name, the first or paternal surname is Hernández and the second or maternal family name is Salas.) is a Mexican former professional tennis player.

== Biography ==
Hernández comes from a large family of tennis players, which includes his sister Claudia, who played in the Federation Cup for Mexico.

In 1981 he represented Mexico in a home Davis Cup tie against Switzerland, held in Tijuana. The tie was a World Group relegation playoff and was won by Mexico, with Hernández losing his dead rubber singles match to Ivan Dupasquier.

A national champion in 1982, Hernández made his only grand slam main draw appearance when he played in the doubles at the 1982 French Open, partnering American Mark Freedman.

His best performance on the professional tour came at the 1983 Monterrey Cup, where he reached the quarter-final stage of the singles, with wins over Steve Meister and Andy Andrews.

== Challenger titles ==
=== Doubles: (1) ===
| Year | Tournament | Surface | Partner | Opponents | Score |
|---|---|---|---|---|---|
| 1984 | San Luis Potosí, Mexico | Clay | (Mexico) Francisco Maciel | (Australia) Ross Case (United States) Chris Dunk | 6–4, 6–2 |

== See also ==
- List of Mexico Davis Cup team representatives
