= Luca Bottazzi =

Italian tennis player (born 1963)

- Country (sports): Italy
- Born: 1 April 1963 (age 61); Milan, Italy
- Height: 1.74 m (5 ft 8 1/2 in)
- Plays: Right-handed
- Prize money: $52,945

Singles
- Career record: 5–14
- Career titles: 0
- Highest ranking: No. 133 (29 April 1985)

Grand Slam singles results
- French Open: 1R (1985)

Doubles
- Career record: 6–18
- Career titles: 0
- Highest ranking: No. 203 (13 May 1985)

Grand Slam doubles results
- French Open: 2R (1982)

Luca Bottazzi (born 1 April 1963) is a former professional tennis player from Italy.

== Career ==
Bottazzi was twice a quarter-finalist in the French Open boys' singles during his junior career, in both 1980 and 1981. He reached the round of 16 in the US Open boys' singles in 1980 and in the Wimbledon boys' singles in 1981.

When he returned to the French Open in 1982, it was in the men's draw, beside Raúl Viver in the doubles competition. They defeated the Swedish combination of Anders Järryd and Hans Simonsson in the first round but were then beaten by Brad Guan and Derek Tarr.

In 1984, he made the quarter-finals of the Palermo Grand Prix tournament, with wins over the world's 50th ranked player Blaine Willenborg and Argentina's Alejandro Ganzábal.

The Italian was beaten by Marko Ostoja in the opening round of the 1985 French Open.

After his tennis career, Bottazzi co-founded the Italian Tennis Research Association (RITA). He developed new scientific methods to teach tennis to young pupils, that were presented at the ITF Tennis Science and Technology Congress in 2003.

Bottazzi currently works as a tennis coach and television commentator for Eurosport and Sky Italia.

== Challenger titles ==
=== Singles: (2) ===
| No. | Date | Tournament | Surface | Opponent | Score |
|---|---|---|---|---|---|
| 1. | 1984 | Tampere, Finland | Clay | (Sweden) Peter Svensson | 6–2, 6–3 |
| 2. | 1987 | Nairobi, Kenya | Clay | (Kenya) Paul Wekesa | 6–2, 7–6 |

=== Doubles: (1) ===
| No. | Date | Tournament | Surface | Partner | Opponents | Score |
|---|---|---|---|---|---|---|
| 1. | 1983 | Bari, Italy | Clay | (Italy) Simone Colombo | (Italy) Mario Calautti (New Zealand) Bruce Derlin | 6–2, 3–6, 6–3 |
