= Raúl Viver =

Ecuadorian tennis player

- Country (sports): Ecuador
- Born: 17 March 1961 (age 65) Guayaquil, Ecuador
- Height: 1.91 m (6 ft 3 in)
- Turned pro: 1980
- Plays: Left-handed
- Prize money: $189,118

Singles
- Career record: 27-58
- Career titles: 0
- Highest ranking: No. 94 (3 Oct 1988)

Grand Slam singles results
- French Open: 2R (1985)
- Wimbledon: 1R (1985)
- US Open: 1R (1985)

Doubles
- Career record: 15-45
- Career titles: 0
- Highest ranking: No. 184 (2 Jan 1984)

Grand Slam doubles results
- French Open: 2R (1982)

Mixed doubles
- Career titles: 0

Grand Slam mixed doubles results
- French Open: QF (1986)

Raúl Antonio Viver (born 17 March 1961) is a former professional tennis player from Ecuador.

== Career ==
Viver was the world number one ranked junior player in 1979, the year that he won the Orange Bowl (18s & Under). He also reached his only semi-final on the Grand Prix tennis circuit in 1979, at Bogotá.

In the 1982 French Open, Viver and partner Luca Bottazzi had a win over fifth seeds Anders Järryd and Hans Simonsson, but lost in the second round. Three years later he won his only Grand Slam singles match, over world number 42 John Fitzgerald. He was a mixed doubles quarter-finalist in the 1986 French Open, with Mariana Perez-Roldan.

The Ecuadorian reached the quarter-finals at Kitzbuhel in 1984 and Buenos Aires the following year.

He appeared in 18 Davis Cup ties for Ecuador during his career, from 1978 to 1990. In the mid-1980s he was part of the team which competed in the World Group and faced players like Jimmy Arias, Boris Becker and Miloslav Mečíř. Viver finished with a 15/13 overall record, winning 14 of his 25 singles rubbers.

== Challenger titles ==
=== Singles: (3) ===
No.	Year	Tournament	Surface	Opponent	Score
1.	1988	Neu-Ulm, West Germany	Clay	(Sweden) Stefan Eriksson	7–5, 6–2
2.	1991	Pembroke Pines, United States	Clay	(United States) Jimmy Brown	6–3, 1–6, 7–6
3.	1991	São Paulo, Brazil	Clay	(Argentina) Gabriel Markus	7–6, 3–6, 6–3

=== Doubles: (3) ===
No.	Year	Tournament	Surface	Partner	Opponents	Score
1.	1982	Brussels, Belgium	Clay	(Spain) Alberto Tous	(Australia) David Graham (Australia) Laurie Warder	3–6, 6–3, 7–5
2.	1983	Brescia, Italy		(Chile) Iván Camus	(Brazil) Dacio Campos (Brazil) Eduardo Oncins	6–2, 5–7, 6–4
3.	1988	Nyon, Switzerland	Clay	(Ecuador) Hugo Núñez	(Sweden) Jan Apell (Finland) Veli Paloheimo	2–6, 6–4, 6–1
