= Bernhard Pils =

Austrian tennis player

- Country (sports): Austria
- Born: 20 October 1961 (age 63); Vienna, Austria
- Height: 5 ft 10 in (178 cm)
- Turned pro: 1980
- Plays: Right-handed
- Prize money: $58,589

Singles
- Career record: 10–26
- Career titles: 0
- Highest ranking: No. 168 (10 Jun 1985)

Grand Slam singles results
- Australian Open: 2R (1982)

Doubles
- Career record: 5–24
- Career titles: 0
- Highest ranking: No. 237 (27 Jul 1987)

Grand Slam doubles results
- Australian Open: 1R (1982)

Bernhard Pils (born 20 October 1961) is a former professional tennis player from Austria.

== Career ==
Pils was a semi-finalist in the boys' singles event at the 1979 French Open.

In 1982 Australian Open, Pils competed in both the men's singles and doubles draws. He had a five set win over Mark Kratzmann in the opening round and came close to beating American Mike Estep in the second round, claiming the first two sets and taking the third into a tiebreak, but ultimately lost in another five set match. His doubles campaign ended in the first round, where he and partner Peter Feigl were beaten by Dale Collings and Cliff Letcher.

Pils defeated both Christian Jessel and Juan Avendaño to make the round of 16 at the Kitzbühel Open in 1984. The following year he was a quarter-finalist at the Lorraine Open, after wins over Loïc Courteau and Thomas Högstedt.

The Austrian represented his country in six Davis Cup ties and won five rubbers, all in singles.
