= Bruce Foxworth =

American tennis player

- Full name: Bruce Foxworth
- Country (sports): United States
- Born: September 25, 1956 (age 69) St. Louis, Missouri
- Died: Los Angeles. California
- Plays: Right-handed
- Prize money: $33,214

Singles
- Career record: 9–15
- Career titles: 0
- Highest ranking: No. 147 (January 3, 1983)

Grand Slam singles results
- French Open: 1R (1980, 1983)
- Wimbledon: 1R (1983)
- US Open: 2R (1979, 1985)

Doubles
- Career record: 1–5
- Career titles: 0
- Highest ranking: No. 417 (January 2, 1984)

Grand Slam doubles results
- French Open: 1R (1980)

Bruce Foxworth (September 25, 1956 - October 21, 2021) was a former professional tennis player from the United States.

== Biography ==
Foxworth, who was born in St. Louis, played collegiate tennis at Hampton University. He died at the age of 65 on October 21, 2021, after battling prostate cancer for the last two years.

As a professional player he based himself in Los Angeles and was one of the leading African American player on tour at that time. His best Grand Prix result was a quarter-final appearance at Cleveland in 1980, with wins over Sashi Menon and Ernie Fernández. In 1983 he attained his career best ranking of 147. He competed in the main draw of the French Open, Wimbledon and US Open during his career. At the 1985 US Open he beat Slobodan Živojinović over five sets, which set up a second round match against third seed Mats Wilander. He lost to Wilander in straight sets.

In 1992, Foxworth was seriously injured in a car accident that left him in hospital for four months with a spinal-cord injury.

He continued to live in Los Angeles working as a tennis coach. Players he has coached include Lori McNeil and Roger Smith.
