= Charles Strode =

American tennis player

- Country (sports): United States
- Born: September 5, 1957 (age 68) San Diego, California
- Height: 6 ft 0 in (1.83 m)
- Plays: Right-handed
- Prize money: $108,448

Singles
- Career record: 8–23
- Career titles: 0
- Highest ranking: No. 136 (April 13, 1981)

Grand Slam singles results
- Australian Open: 1R (1982, 1983)
- French Open: 1R (1982)

Doubles
- Career record: 54–84
- Career titles: 1
- Highest ranking: No. 50 (January 3, 1983)

Grand Slam doubles results
- Australian Open: QF (1982)
- French Open: 3R (1984)
- Wimbledon: QF (1985)
- US Open: QF (1982)

Mixed doubles

Grand Slam mixed doubles results
- French Open: F (1983)
- Wimbledon: SF (1982, 1983)
- US Open: 2R (1982)

Charles Darlington "Buzz" Strode Jr. (born September 5, 1957) is an American former professional tennis player.

== Career ==
Strode was most successful at doubles, often playing beside his brother Morris "Skip" Strode. It was with his brother that he made the men's doubles quarter-finals at the US Open and Australian Open in 1982. His other Grand Slam quarter-final appearance in the men's doubles, at the 1985 Wimbledon Championships, was with South African Eddie Edwards. Strode and his brother won the 1982 Hong Kong and were also runners-up in Bangkok that year.

He made one Grand Slam mixed doubles final, which was with Leslie Allen at the 1983 French Open. They lost the final to fellow Americans Barbara Jordan and Eliot Teltscher.

Strode competed in the singles draw at three Grand Slam tournaments, but lost in the opening round each time, to Gustavo Tiberti at the 1982 French Open, Rod Frawley at the 1982 Australian Open and Mark Edmondson at the 1983 Australian Open. His best singles performance on the Grand Prix tennis circuit came at the Tokyo Outdoor tournament, where he had a win over Tim Gullikson, en route to the quarter-finals.

== Personal life ==
Charles has a daughter Courtney Strode who is a professional soccer player.

== Grand Slam finals ==
=== Mixed doubles: 1 (0–1) ===
| Result | Year | Championship | Surface | Partner | Opponents | Score |
|---|---|---|---|---|---|---|
| Loss | 1983 | French Open | Clay | (United States) Leslie Allen | (United States) Barbara Jordan (United States) Eliot Teltscher | 2–6, 3–6 |

== Grand Prix career finals ==
=== Doubles: 2 (1–1) ===
| Result | W/L | Year | Tournament | Surface | Partner | Opponents | Score |
|---|---|---|---|---|---|---|---|
| Win | 1–0 | 1982 | Hong Kong | Hard | (United States) Morris Strode | (Australia) Kim Warwick (United States) Van Winitsky | 6–4, 3–6, 6–2 |
| Loss | 1–1 | 1982 | Bangkok, Thailand | Carpet | (United States) Morris Strode | (United States) Mike Bauer (United States) John Benson | 5–7, 6–3, 3–6 |

== Challenger titles ==
=== Doubles: (7) ===
| No. | Year | Tournament | Surface | Partner | Opponents | Score |
|---|---|---|---|---|---|---|
| 1. | 1982 | Chigasaki, Japan | Clay | (United States) Morris Strode | (India) Sashi Menon (United States) Walter Redondo | 6–3, 6–4 |
| 2. | 1982 | Nagareyama, Japan | Hard | (United States) Morris Strode | (India) Sashi Menon (United States) Walter Redondo | 4–6, 6–1, 6–4 |
| 3. | 1982 | São Paulo, Brazil | Clay | (United States) Morris Strode | (Peru) Pablo Arraya (Paraguay) Víctor Pecci | 6–1, 6–4 |
| 4. | 1983 | Tokyo, Japan | Hard | (United States) Morris Strode | (United States) David Dowlen (United States) Jeff Turpin | 6–3, 6–4 |
| 5. | 1984 | Agadir, Morocco | Clay | (United States) Morris Strode | (Spain) Juan Avendaño (Spain) Emilio Sánchez | 6–3, 6–4 |
| 6. | 1985 | Ogun, Nigeria | Hard | (United States) Chris Dunk | (United States) Egan Adams (United States) Mark Wooldridge | 7–5, 2–6, 6–3 |
| 7. | 1986 | Enugu, Nigeria | Hard | (Czechoslovakia) Stanislav Birner | (United States) Brett Buffington (United States) Ted Erck | 6–4, 7–6 |
