= Joe Meyers (tennis) =

American tennis player

- Country (sports): United States
- Born: Fremont, California, U.S.

Singles
- Career record: 3–6
- Highest ranking: No. 163 (July 12, 1978)

Grand Slam singles results
- Australian Open: 2R (1982)

Doubles
- Career record: 1–8
- Highest ranking: No. 279 (February 1, 1984)

Grand Slam doubles results
- French Open: 1R (1978)

Joe Meyers is an American former professional tennis player.

Meyers, who grew up in Fremont, California, received a full tennis scholarship to San Jose State College.

Following his college career he competed on the professional tour and reached a career high ranking of 163 in the world. His best performance came at the 1982 Australian Open, where he had a first round win over a former finalist John Lloyd, then took Australia's John Fitzgerald to five sets in a second round loss.
