= Fernando Luna (tennis) =

Spanish tennis player (born 1958)

- Full name: Fernando Luna Vicente
- Country (sports): Spain
- Residence: Barcelona, Spain
- Born: 24 April 1958 (age 68) Ciudad Real, Spain
- Height: 1.75 m (5 ft 9 in)
- Turned pro: 1977
- Retired: 1991
- Plays: Right-handed (two-handed backhand)
- Prize money: $561,404

Singles
- Career record: 177–163
- Career titles: 0
- Highest ranking: No. 33 (14 May 1984)

Grand Slam singles results
- Australian Open: 1R (1991)
- French Open: 4R (1983)
- Wimbledon: 1R (1988, 1989)

Doubles
- Career record: 7–37
- Career titles: 0
- Highest ranking: No. 407 (3 October 1988)
Medal record
Mediterranean Games
Gold medal – first place	1979 Split	Singles
Bronze medal – third place	1979 Split	Doubles

Fernando Luna Vicente (born 24 April 1958) is a former tennis player from Spain.

The right-handed player achieved his highest ATP singles ranking of world No. 33 in May 1984 and finished runner-up in two Grand Prix finals during his career: Aix-en-Provence in 1984, and Madrid in 1988. Luna reached the fourth round of the 1983 French Open, defeating José Luis Clerc en route.

== Career finals ==
=== Singles (2 losses) ===
Result	W/L	Date	Tournament	Surface	Opponent	Score
Loss	0–1	Apr 1984	Aix-en-Provence, France	Clay	(Spain) Juan Aguilera	4–6, 5–7
Loss	0–2	Apr 1988	Madrid, Spain	Clay	(Sweden) Kent Carlsson	2–6, 1–6
