= Jérôme Vanier =

French tennis player (born 1957)

- Full name: Jérôme Vanier
- Country (sports): France
- Born: 2 November 1957 (age 67) Boulogne-Billancourt, France
- Height: 1.75 m (5 ft 9 in)
- Plays: Left-handed

Singles
- Career record: 5–17
- Highest ranking: No. 152 (25 June 1984)

Grand Slam singles results
- French Open: 1R (1978, 1984)
- US Open: 2R (1983)

Doubles
- Career record: 4–11

Grand Slam doubles results
- French Open: 1R (1980, 1982, 1985)

Jérôme Vanier (born 2 November 1957) is a former professional tennis player from France.

== Biography ==
A left-handed player from Paris, Vanier played collegiate tennis in the United States, first at the University of Dallas, then in the early 1980s for Southern Methodist University.

As a professional player, one of his best performances came in the first round of the 1983 US Open, where he had a straight sets wins over world number 26 Robert Van't Hof.

Since 1994 he has been the Director of the Tennis Club de Lyon.

He is the elder brother of former WTA Tour player Corinne Vanier.

== Challenger titles ==
=== Doubles: (1) ===
No.	Year	Tournament	Surface	Partner	Opponents	Score
1.	1984	Brescia, Italy	Clay	(France) Jacques Hervet	(Argentina) Alejandro Ganzábal (Argentina) Carlos Gattiker	7–5, 2–6, 6–4
