= Morris Strode =

American tennis player

- Country (sports): United States
- Born: June 5, 1960; El Cajon, California
- Died: April 17, 2021 (aged 60); San Diego, California
- Height: 6 ft 4 in (1.93 m)
- Plays: Right-handed
- Prize money: $96,917

Singles
- Career record: 17–26
- Career titles: 0
- Highest ranking: No. 98 (January 3, 1983)

Grand Slam singles results
- Australian Open: 2R (1982, 1983)
- French Open: 1R (1983)
- Wimbledon: 1R (1983)

Doubles
- Career record: 35–50
- Career titles: 1
- Highest ranking: No. 47 (January 3, 1983)

Grand Slam doubles results
- Australian Open: QF (1982)
- French Open: 2R (1983)
- Wimbledon: 2R (1982)
- US Open: QF (1982)

Morris Chesney "Skip" Strode (June 5, 1960 – April 17, 2021) was an American professional tennis player.

During Strode's career, he won one doubles title. He achieved a career-high singles ranking of world No. 98 in 1983 and a career-high doubles ranking of world No. 47 in 1983.

== Career finals ==
=== Singles (2 losses) ===
Result	W/L	Year	Tournament	Surface	Opponents	Score
Loss	0–1	1982	Hong Kong	Hard	(United States) Pat Du Pré	3–6, 3–6
Loss	0–2	1983	Caracas, Venezuela	Hard	(Mexico) Raúl Ramírez	4–6, 2–6

=== Doubles (1 win) ===
Result	W/L	Year	Tournament	Surface	Partner	Opponents	Score
Win	1–0	1982	Hong Kong	Hard	(United States) Charles Strode	(Australia) Kim Warwick (United States) Van Winitsky	6–4, 3–6, 6–2
Loss	1-1	1982	Bangkok, Thailand	Carpet	(United States) Charles Strode	(United States) Mike Bauer (United States) John Benson	5–7, 6–3, 3–6
