= 1983 French Open =

- Date: 23 May – 5 June 1983
- Edition: 82
- Category: 53rd Grand Slam (ITF)
- Draw: 128S / 64D / 48X
- Surface: Clay / Outdoor
- Location: Paris (XVI^{e}), France
- Venue: Stade Roland Garros

Champions

Men's singles
- (France) Yannick Noah

Women's singles
- (United States) Chris Evert

Men's doubles
- (Sweden) Anders Järryd / (Sweden) Hans Simonsson

Women's doubles
- (South Africa) Rosalyn Fairbank Nideffer / (United States) Candy Reynolds

Mixed doubles
- (United States) Barbara Jordan / (United States) Eliot Teltscher
- French Open

The 1983 French Open was a tennis tournament that took place on the outdoor clay courts at the Stade Roland Garros in Paris, France. The tournament ran from 23 May until 5 June. It was the 82nd staging of the French Open, and the first Grand Slam tennis event of 1983.

== Finals ==
=== Men's singles ===
(France) Yannick Noah defeated (Sweden) Mats Wilander, 6–2, 7–5, 7–6^{(7–3)}

- It was Noah's 3rd title of the year, and his 14th overall. It was his 1st (and only) career Grand Slam title.

=== Women's singles ===
(United States) Chris Evert defeated (Socialist Federal Republic of Yugoslavia) Mima Jaušovec, 6–1, 6–2

- It was Evert's 15th career Grand Slam title, and her 5th French Open title.

=== Men's doubles ===
(Sweden) Anders Järryd / (Sweden) Hans Simonsson defeated (Australia) Mark Edmondson / (United States) Sherwood Stewart, 7–6^{(7–4)}, 6–4, 6–2

=== Women's doubles ===
(South Africa) Rosalyn Fairbank / (United States) Candy Reynolds defeated (United States) Kathy Jordan / (United States) Anne Smith, 5–7, 7–5, 6–2

=== Mixed doubles ===
(United States) Barbara Jordan / (United States) Eliot Teltscher defeated (United States) Leslie Allen / (United States) Charles Strode, 6–2, 6–3

== Prize money ==
Event		W	F	SF	QF	4R	3R	2R	1R
Singles	Men	FF675,420	FF328,750	FF164,380	FF83,280	FF48,210	FF26,295	FF15,340	FF8,765
Singles	Women	FF526,000	FF280,500	FF140,300	FF73,460	FF38,550	FF19,290	FF9,120	FF4,910

Total prize money for the event was FF9,782,133.

Preceded by 1982 Australian Open	Grand Slams	Succeeded by 1983 Wimbledon Championships
