= 1982 ATP Challenger Series =

Details
- Duration: 11 January 1982 – 28 November 1982
- Edition: 5th
- Tournaments: 43

Achievements (singles)

The ATP Challenger Series is the second-tier tour for professional tennis organised by the Association of Tennis Professionals (ATP). The 1982 ATP Challenger Series calendar comprises 41 tournaments, with prize money ranging from $25,000 up to $50,000.

== Schedule ==
=== January ===
Week of	Tournament	Champions	Runners-up	Semifinalists	Quarterfinalists
January 4	No tournaments scheduled.				
January 11	Perth Challenger (Australia) Perth, Australia; Grass – $25,000 – 64S/32D; Singles draw – Doubles draw	(South Africa) Eddie Edwards; 6–3, 6–2	(Australia) Craig A. Miller	(Australia) Brad Guan (Australia) Dale Collings	(Australia) Wayne Hampson (Australia) Brad Drewett (Australia) Syd Ball (United States) Andy Andrews
January 11	Perth Challenger (Australia) Perth, Australia; Grass – $25,000 – 64S/32D; Singles draw – Doubles draw	(Australia) Syd Ball (Australia) John Fitzgerald; 6–3, 6–3	(Australia) Brett Edwards (Australia) Cliff Letcher	(Australia) Brad Guan (Australia) Dale Collings	(Australia) Wayne Hampson (Australia) Brad Drewett (Australia) Syd Ball (United States) Andy Andrews
January 18	No tournaments scheduled.				
January 25	No tournaments scheduled.				

=== February ===
Week of	Tournament	Champions	Runners-up	Semifinalists	Quarterfinalists
February 1	No tournaments scheduled.				
February 8	Nairobi Challenger (Kenya) Nairobi, Kenya; Clay – $25,000 – 32S/16D; Singles draw – Doubles draw	(Zimbabwe) Haroon Ismail; 1–6, 6–1, 6–3	(United States) Egan Adams	(West Germany) Peter Spang (West Germany) Harald Theissen	(United States) Drew Gitlin (Austria) Bernhard Pils (United States) Ed Nagel (France) Georges Goven
February 8	Nairobi Challenger (Kenya) Nairobi, Kenya; Clay – $25,000 – 32S/16D; Singles draw – Doubles draw	(United States) Drew Gitlin (Czechoslovakia) Jan Kodeš; 6–4, 3–6, 6–3	(Austria) Bernhard Pils (Austria) Helmar Stiegler	(West Germany) Peter Spang (West Germany) Harald Theissen	(United States) Drew Gitlin (Austria) Bernhard Pils (United States) Ed Nagel (France) Georges Goven
February 15	Buchholz Challenger; Buchholz, West Germany $25,000 – hard (I) – 64S/32D; Singles draw – Doubles draw	(Sweden) Mats Wilander; 6–3, 6–3	(Republic of Ireland) Sean Sorensen	(Czechoslovakia) Jaroslav Navrátil (Sweden) Jan Gunnarsson	(Switzerland) Jakob Hlasek (United States) Rocky Royer (West Germany) Michael Westphal (United States) Mike Gandolfo
February 15	Buchholz Challenger; Buchholz, West Germany $25,000 – hard (I) – 64S/32D; Singles draw – Doubles draw	(United States) Mike Gandolfo (South Africa) Derek Tarr; 6–4, 6–4	(Czechoslovakia) Jiří Průcha (Sweden) Tenny Svensson	(Czechoslovakia) Jaroslav Navrátil (Sweden) Jan Gunnarsson	(Switzerland) Jakob Hlasek (United States) Rocky Royer (West Germany) Michael Westphal (United States) Mike Gandolfo
February 15	Tunis Challenger (Tunisia) Tunis, Tunisia; Clay – $50,000 – 32S/16D; Singles draw – Doubles draw	(Spain) Juan Avendaño; 6–4, 6–4, 6–4	(Spain) José García Requena	(United States) Craig Wittus (West Germany) Damir Keretić	(Sweden) Thomas Högstedt (Egypt) Ismail El Shafei (Belgium) Thierry Stevaux (United States) Egan Adams
February 15	Tunis Challenger (Tunisia) Tunis, Tunisia; Clay – $50,000 – 32S/16D; Singles draw – Doubles draw	(United States) Steve Meister (United States) Craig Wittus; 6–4, 1–6, 6–1	(Egypt) Ismail El Shafei (Czechoslovakia) Jan Kodeš	(United States) Craig Wittus (West Germany) Damir Keretić	(Sweden) Thomas Högstedt (Egypt) Ismail El Shafei (Belgium) Thierry Stevaux (United States) Egan Adams
February 22	No tournaments scheduled.				

=== March ===
Week of	Tournament	Champions	Runners-up	Semifinalists	Quarterfinalists
March 1	São Paulo-1 Challenger; São Paulo, Brazil $25,000 – hard (I) – 32S/16D; Singles draw – Doubles draw	(Brazil) Thomaz Koch; 7–6, 7–6	(Brazil) Cássio Motta	(Brazil) Renato Joaquim (Brazil) Givaldo Barbosa	(Brazil) Fernando Roese (Brazil) Roger Guedes (Argentina) Andres Molina (Brazil) Júlio Góes
March 1	São Paulo-1 Challenger; São Paulo, Brazil $25,000 – hard (I) – 32S/16D; Singles draw – Doubles draw	(Brazil) Givaldo Barbosa (Brazil) Júlio Góes; 6–4, 6–1	(Brazil) Thomaz Koch (Brazil) Cássio Motta	(Brazil) Renato Joaquim (Brazil) Givaldo Barbosa	(Brazil) Fernando Roese (Brazil) Roger Guedes (Argentina) Andres Molina (Brazil) Júlio Góes
March 8	No tournaments scheduled.				
March 15	No tournaments scheduled.				
March 22	No tournaments scheduled.				
March 29	No tournaments scheduled.				

=== April ===
Week of	Tournament	Champions	Runners-up	Semifinalists	Quarterfinalists
April 5	Curitiba Challenger (Brazil) Curitiba, Brazil; Clay – $50,000 – 32S/16D; Singles draw – Doubles draw	(Brazil) Carlos Kirmayr; 6–2, 6–4	(Brazil) João Soares	(Argentina) Alejandro Gattiker (Brazil) Cássio Motta	(Brazil) Givaldo Barbosa (Brazil) Marcos Hocevar (Brazil) Júlio Góes (Argentina) Alejandro Ganzábal
April 5	Curitiba Challenger (Brazil) Curitiba, Brazil; Clay – $50,000 – 32S/16D; Singles draw – Doubles draw	(Brazil) Givaldo Barbosa (Brazil) João Soares; 7–6, 6–1	(Brazil) Carlos Kirmayr (Brazil) Cássio Motta	(Argentina) Alejandro Gattiker (Brazil) Cássio Motta	(Brazil) Givaldo Barbosa (Brazil) Marcos Hocevar (Brazil) Júlio Góes (Argentina) Alejandro Ganzábal
April 5	Johannesburg Challenger (South Africa) Johannesburg, South Africa; Hard – $25,000 – 48S/24D; Singles draw – Doubles draw	(South Africa) Danie Visser; 6–4, 6–3	(United States) Van Winitsky	(South Africa) Rory Chappell (Paraguay) Francisco González	(United States) Hank Pfister (South Africa) Barry Moir (United States) Tim Wilkison (United States) Terry Moor
April 5	Johannesburg Challenger (South Africa) Johannesburg, South Africa; Hard – $25,000 – 48S/24D; Singles draw – Doubles draw	(South Africa) Freddie Sauer (South Africa) Schalk van der Merwe; 6–2, 6–1	(South Africa) Danie Visser (South Africa) Tian Viljoen	(South Africa) Rory Chappell (Paraguay) Francisco González	(United States) Hank Pfister (South Africa) Barry Moir (United States) Tim Wilkison (United States) Terry Moor
April 5	Tokyo Challenger (Japan) Tokyo, Japan; Clay – $25,000 – 32S/16D; Singles draw – Doubles draw	(Nigeria) Nduka Odizor; 6–4, 3–6, 6–1	(United States) Jim Gurfein	(United States) David Dowlen (Australia) Pat Cash	(New Zealand) David Mustard (Austria) Peter Feigl (Australia) Craig A. Miller (Sweden) Henrik Sundström
April 5	Tokyo Challenger (Japan) Tokyo, Japan; Clay – $25,000 – 32S/16D; Singles draw – Doubles draw	(Australia) Pat Cash (Australia) Craig A. Miller; 6–2, 6–2	(New Zealand) Bruce Derlin (New Zealand) David Mustard	(United States) David Dowlen (Australia) Pat Cash	(New Zealand) David Mustard (Austria) Peter Feigl (Australia) Craig A. Miller (Sweden) Henrik Sundström
April 12	Barcelona Challenger (Spain) Barcelona, Spain; Clay – $25,000 – 32S/32D; Singles draw – Doubles draw	(Uruguay) Diego Pérez; 6–3, 6–0	(Spain) Alberto Tous	(Spain) Fernando Luna (Spain) Roberto Vizcaíno	(France) Jean-Louis Haillet (Israel) Steve Krulevitz (Australia) Broderick Dyke (Spain) Sergio Casal
April 12	Barcelona Challenger (Spain) Barcelona, Spain; Clay – $25,000 – 32S/32D; Singles draw – Doubles draw	(Spain) Sergio Casal (West Germany) Christoph Zipf; 5–7, 6–1, 6–2	(Australia) Broderick Dyke (Austria) Hans-Peter Kandler	(Spain) Fernando Luna (Spain) Roberto Vizcaíno	(France) Jean-Louis Haillet (Israel) Steve Krulevitz (Australia) Broderick Dyke (Spain) Sergio Casal
April 12	Hypo Group Tennis International (Italy) Bari, Italy; Clay – $25,000 – 32S/16D; Singles draw – Doubles draw	(Australia) Paul McNamee; 6–2, 6–2	(Hungary) Balázs Taróczy	(Socialist Federal Republic of Yugoslavia) Marko Ostoja (Czechoslovakia) Tomáš Šmíd	(Italy) Famiano Meneschincheri (Socialist Federal Republic of Yugoslavia) Željko Franulović (Italy) Corrado Barazzutti (Sweden) Jan Gunnarsson
April 12	Hypo Group Tennis International (Italy) Bari, Italy; Clay – $25,000 – 32S/16D; Singles draw – Doubles draw	(Argentina) Alejandro Ganzábal (Argentina) Gustavo Guerrero; 6–3, 6–2	(Italy) Luca Bottazzi (Switzerland) Ivan Dupasquier	(Socialist Federal Republic of Yugoslavia) Marko Ostoja (Czechoslovakia) Tomáš Šmíd	(Italy) Famiano Meneschincheri (Socialist Federal Republic of Yugoslavia) Željko Franulović (Italy) Corrado Barazzutti (Sweden) Jan Gunnarsson
April 12	Chigasaki Challenger (Japan) Chigasaki, Japan; Clay – $25,000 – 32S/16D; Singles draw – Doubles draw	(United States) Tom Cain; 6–4, 6–3	(Sweden) Henrik Sundström	(Austria) Peter Feigl (United States) James Delaney	(Australia) Craig A. Miller (Australia) Peter Johnston (Australia) Wally Masur (India) Sashi Menon
April 12	Chigasaki Challenger (Japan) Chigasaki, Japan; Clay – $25,000 – 32S/16D; Singles draw – Doubles draw	(United States) Charles Strode (United States) Morris Strode; 6–3, 6–4	(India) Sashi Menon (United States) Walter Redondo	(Austria) Peter Feigl (United States) James Delaney	(Australia) Craig A. Miller (Australia) Peter Johnston (Australia) Wally Masur (India) Sashi Menon
April 19	Parioli Challenger (Italy) Parioli, Italy; Clay – $25,000 – 32S/16D; Singles draw – Doubles draw	(Italy) Corrado Barazzutti; 6–3, 2–6, 6–1	(Argentina) Alejandro Ganzábal	(Romania) Florin Segărceanu (Spain) Gabriel Urpí	(Socialist Federal Republic of Yugoslavia) Željko Franulović (Brazil) Cássio Motta (West Germany) Karl Meiler (Australia) Brad Guan
April 19	Parioli Challenger (Italy) Parioli, Italy; Clay – $25,000 – 32S/16D; Singles draw – Doubles draw	(Chile) Iván Camus (Spain) Gabriel Urpí; 3–6, 6–4, 6–3	(Argentina) Guillermo Aubone (Peru) Fernando Maynetto	(Romania) Florin Segărceanu (Spain) Gabriel Urpí	(Socialist Federal Republic of Yugoslavia) Željko Franulović (Brazil) Cássio Motta (West Germany) Karl Meiler (Australia) Brad Guan
April 19	Nagareyama Challenger (Japan) Nagareyama, Japan; Hard – $25,000 – 32S/16D; Singles draw – Doubles draw	(New Zealand) Russell Simpson; 6–3, 6–7, 7–5	(United States) Charles Strode	(Nigeria) Nduka Odizor (United States) Jim Gurfein	(United States) Dave Siegler (Australia) Peter Johnston (United States) James Delaney (United States) Bruce Kleege
April 19	Nagareyama Challenger (Japan) Nagareyama, Japan; Hard – $25,000 – 32S/16D; Singles draw – Doubles draw	(United States) Charles Strode (United States) Morris Strode; 4–6, 6–1, 6–4	(India) Sashi Menon (United States) Walter Redondo	(Nigeria) Nduka Odizor (United States) Jim Gurfein	(United States) Dave Siegler (Australia) Peter Johnston (United States) James Delaney (United States) Bruce Kleege
April 26	Toyota City Challenger (Japan) Toyota City, Japan; Hard – $30,000 – 32S/16D; Singles draw – Doubles draw	(Australia) Wally Masur; NA	(United States) Joel Bailey	(United States) Charles Strode (Australia) Pat Cash	(United States) Morris Strode (Australia) Warren Maher (Australia) John McCurdy (United States) Ian Harris

=== May ===
Week of	Tournament	Champions	Runners-up	Semifinalists	Quarterfinalists
May 3	Berkeley Challenger (United States) Berkeley, USA; Hard – $25,000 – 64S/32D; Singles draw – Doubles draw	(United States) Scott McCain; 6–3, 7–5	(United States) David Pate	(United States) Trey Waltke (United States) Martin Davis	(United States) Larry Stefanki (United States) Andy Kohlberg (United Kingdom) Michael Wayman (United States) Lloyd Bourne
May 3	Berkeley Challenger (United States) Berkeley, USA; Hard – $25,000 – 64S/32D; Singles draw – Doubles draw	(United States) Lloyd Bourne (United States) Matt Mitchell; 6–4, 6–4	(United States) Billy Martin (United States) Bruce Nichols	(United States) Trey Waltke (United States) Martin Davis	(United States) Larry Stefanki (United States) Andy Kohlberg (United Kingdom) Michael Wayman (United States) Lloyd Bourne
May 3	Galatina Challenger (Italy) Galatina, Italy; Clay – $25,000 – 32S/16D; Singles draw – Doubles draw	(France) Dominique Bedel; 7–6, 1–6, 7–5	(United States) Pender Murphy	(Argentina) Thomas Stålhandske (Spain) Sergio Casal	(Brazil) Ney Keller (Austria) Gerald Mild (Argentina) Carlos Castellan (Spain) Gabriel Urpí
May 3	Galatina Challenger (Italy) Galatina, Italy; Clay – $25,000 – 32S/16D; Singles draw – Doubles draw	(Spain) Sergio Casal (Chile) Alejandro Pierola; 6–4, 6–4	(Italy) Gianni Marchetti (Italy) Vincenzo Naso	(Argentina) Thomas Stålhandske (Spain) Sergio Casal	(Brazil) Ney Keller (Austria) Gerald Mild (Argentina) Carlos Castellan (Spain) Gabriel Urpí
May 3	Solihull Challenger (United Kingdom) Solihull, Great Britain; Clay – $25,000 – 32S/16D; Singles draw – Doubles draw	(United Kingdom) Andrew Jarrett; 6–3, 6–1	(United Kingdom) Jonathan Smith	(South Africa) Schalk van der Merwe (France) Christophe Freyss	(New Zealand) David Mustard (United Kingdom) Jeremy Bates (Netherlands) Louk Sanders (Australia) Greg Whitecross
May 3	Solihull Challenger (United Kingdom) Solihull, Great Britain; Clay – $25,000 – 32S/16D; Singles draw – Doubles draw	(India) Anand Amritraj (Australia) Brad Guan; 6–4, 3–6, 6–3	(United Kingdom) Andrew Jarrett (United Kingdom) Jonathan Smith	(South Africa) Schalk van der Merwe (France) Christophe Freyss	(New Zealand) David Mustard (United Kingdom) Jeremy Bates (Netherlands) Louk Sanders (Australia) Greg Whitecross
May 10	Lee-on-Solent Challenger (United Kingdom) Lee-on-Solent, Great Britain; Clay – $25,000 – 32S/16D; Singles draw – Doubles draw	(South Africa) Brent Pirow; 6–7, 6–4, 6–1	(South Africa) Derek Tarr	(Australia) Craig A. Miller (Australia) Charlie Fancutt	(South Africa) Raymond Moore (Australia) Greg Whitecross (Australia) Warren Maher (India) Anand Amritraj
May 10	Lee-on-Solent Challenger (United Kingdom) Lee-on-Solent, Great Britain; Clay – $25,000 – 32S/16D; Singles draw – Doubles draw	(South Africa) Danie Visser (South Africa) Tian Viljoen; 6–1, 1–6, 6–3	(South Africa) Derek Tarr (South Africa) Schalk van der Merwe	(Australia) Craig A. Miller (Australia) Charlie Fancutt	(South Africa) Raymond Moore (Australia) Greg Whitecross (Australia) Warren Maher (India) Anand Amritraj
May 17	No tournaments scheduled.				
May 24	No tournaments scheduled.				
May 31	Brescia Challenger (Italy) Brescia, Italy; Clay – $25,000 – 32S/16D; Singles draw – Doubles draw	(Romania) Florin Segărceanu; 2–6, 6–0, 6–4	(France) Dominique Bedel	(Italy) Simone Colombo (Argentina) Carlos Castellan	(United States) Jimmy Brown (Chile) Alejandro Pierola (Socialist Federal Republic of Yugoslavia) Marko Ostoja (Italy) Gianni Marchetti
May 31	Brescia Challenger (Italy) Brescia, Italy; Clay – $25,000 – 32S/16D; Singles draw – Doubles draw	(Brazil) Carlos Kirmayr (Romania) Florin Segărceanu; 7–6, 6–2	(Italy) Patrizio Parrini (Italy) Federico Rinaldi	(Italy) Simone Colombo (Argentina) Carlos Castellan	(United States) Jimmy Brown (Chile) Alejandro Pierola (Socialist Federal Republic of Yugoslavia) Marko Ostoja (Italy) Gianni Marchetti
May 31	Tampere Open (Finland) Tampere, Finland; Clay – $25,000 – 32S/16D; Singles draw – Doubles draw	(Denmark) Peter Bastiansen; 3–6, 7–5, 6–2	(Israel) Steve Krulevitz	(Czechoslovakia) Stanislav Birner (Finland) Kimmo Alkio	(West Germany) Hans-Dieter Beutel (West Germany) Christoph Zipf (Denmark) Michael Mortensen (United States) Rocky Royer
May 31	Tampere Open (Finland) Tampere, Finland; Clay – $25,000 – 32S/16D; Singles draw – Doubles draw	(Sweden) Magnus Tideman (Sweden) Jörgen Windahl; 6–4, 7–6	(Czechoslovakia) Stanislav Birner (Paraguay) Francisco González	(Czechoslovakia) Stanislav Birner (Finland) Kimmo Alkio	(West Germany) Hans-Dieter Beutel (West Germany) Christoph Zipf (Denmark) Michael Mortensen (United States) Rocky Royer

=== June ===
Week of	Tournament	Champions	Runners-up	Semifinalists	Quarterfinalists
June 7	No tournaments scheduled.				
June 14	No tournaments scheduled.				
June 21	No tournaments scheduled.				
June 28	Travemünde Challenger (West Germany) Travemünde, West Germany; Clay – $25,000 – 64S/32D; Singles draw – Doubles draw	(France) Dominique Bedel; 6–4, 6–4	(West Germany) Wolfgang Popp	(France) Christophe Freyss (Italy) Gianluca Rinaldini	(Socialist Federal Republic of Yugoslavia) Slobodan Živojinović (United States) Andy Kohlberg (Sweden) Per Hjertquist (United States) Rocky Royer
June 28	Travemünde Challenger (West Germany) Travemünde, West Germany; Clay – $25,000 – 64S/32D; Singles draw – Doubles draw	(West Germany) Wolfgang Popp (Switzerland) Roland Stadler; 6–4, 6–2	(Australia) Brad Guan (Australia) Warren Maher	(France) Christophe Freyss (Italy) Gianluca Rinaldini	(Socialist Federal Republic of Yugoslavia) Slobodan Živojinović (United States) Andy Kohlberg (Sweden) Per Hjertquist (United States) Rocky Royer

=== July ===
Week of	Tournament	Champions	Runners-up	Semifinalists	Quarterfinalists
July 5	Cologne Challenger (West Germany) Cologne, West Germany; Clay – $25,000 – 64S/32D; Singles draw – Doubles draw	(France) Dominique Bedel; 2–6, 6–3, 6–4	(West Germany) Andreas Maurer	(United States) Scott Lipton (Sweden) Per Hjertquist	(South Africa) Eddie Edwards (Romania) Florin Segărceanu (West Germany) Damir Keretić (Sweden) Jan Gunnarsson
July 5	Cologne Challenger (West Germany) Cologne, West Germany; Clay – $25,000 – 64S/32D; Singles draw – Doubles draw	(Australia) Brad Guan (Australia) Warren Maher; 6–2, 6–4	(Australia) Chris Johnstone (Australia) Cliff Letcher	(United States) Scott Lipton (Sweden) Per Hjertquist	(South Africa) Eddie Edwards (Romania) Florin Segărceanu (West Germany) Damir Keretić (Sweden) Jan Gunnarsson
July 12	Lisbon Challenger (Portugal) Lisbon, Portugal; Clay – $25,000 – 32S/16D; Singles draw – Doubles draw	(United States) Rocky Royer; 6–3, 1–6, 6–3	(South Africa) Robbie Venter	(Spain) Francisco Ferrer (United Kingdom) Andrew Jarrett	(Australia) Peter Johnston (Netherlands) Michiel Schapers (France) Patrice Kuchna (South Africa) Deon Joubert
July 12	Lisbon Challenger (Portugal) Lisbon, Portugal; Clay – $25,000 – 32S/16D; Singles draw – Doubles draw	(United Kingdom) John Feaver (United Kingdom) Andrew Jarrett; 7–5, 6–3	(United States) Richard Akel (Brazil) Eduardo Oncins	(Spain) Francisco Ferrer (United Kingdom) Andrew Jarrett	(Australia) Peter Johnston (Netherlands) Michiel Schapers (France) Patrice Kuchna (South Africa) Deon Joubert
July 19	Campos Challenger (Brazil) Campos, Brazil; Clay – $50,000 – 32S/16D; Singles draw – Doubles draw	(United States) Mark Dickson; 6–3, 6–4	(United States) Egan Adams	(Argentina) Ricardo Cano (United States) Mike Brunnberg	(United States) Bruce Kleege (Brazil) Júlio Góes (Brazil) Cássio Motta (Brazil) Thomaz Koch
July 19	Campos Challenger (Brazil) Campos, Brazil; Clay – $50,000 – 32S/16D; Singles draw – Doubles draw	(Brazil) Thomaz Koch (Brazil) José Schmidt; 6–2, 6–7, 7–6	(Brazil) Givaldo Barbosa (Brazil) João Soares	(Argentina) Ricardo Cano (United States) Mike Brunnberg	(United States) Bruce Kleege (Brazil) Júlio Góes (Brazil) Cássio Motta (Brazil) Thomaz Koch
July 26	Neu-Ulm Challenger (West Germany) Neu-Ulm, West Germany; Clay – $25,000 – 64S/32D; Singles draw – Doubles draw	(West Germany) Karl Meiler; 2–6, 7–6, 6–1	(United States) Scott Lipton	(Spain) Alberto Tous (United Kingdom) Andrew Jarrett	(West Germany) Andreas Maurer (West Germany) Eric Jelen (West Germany) Damir Keretić (Austria) Hans Kary
July 26	Neu-Ulm Challenger (West Germany) Neu-Ulm, West Germany; Clay – $25,000 – 64S/32D; Singles draw – Doubles draw	(West Germany) Karl Meiler (Czechoslovakia) Jaroslav Navrátil; 6–3, 6–3	(Czechoslovakia) Dusan Kulhaj (United States) John Van Nostrand	(Spain) Alberto Tous (United Kingdom) Andrew Jarrett	(West Germany) Andreas Maurer (West Germany) Eric Jelen (West Germany) Damir Keretić (Austria) Hans Kary
July 26	Rio de Janeiro Open (Brazil) Rio de Janeiro, Brazil; Clay – $50,000 – 64S/32D; Singles draw – Doubles draw	(Brazil) João Soares; 6–1, 0–6, 6–1	(United States) Mark Dickson	(France) Dominique Bedel (Italy) Gianluca Rinaldini	(Chile) Alejandro Pierola (Brazil) Givaldo Barbosa (Sweden) Magnus Tideman (Brazil) Cássio Motta
July 26	Rio de Janeiro Open (Brazil) Rio de Janeiro, Brazil; Clay – $50,000 – 64S/32D; Singles draw – Doubles draw	(France) Dominique Bedel (Chile) Belus Prajoux; 6–2, 6–7, 6–2	(United States) Mark Dickson (United States) Joel Hoffman	(France) Dominique Bedel (Italy) Gianluca Rinaldini	(Chile) Alejandro Pierola (Brazil) Givaldo Barbosa (Sweden) Magnus Tideman (Brazil) Cássio Motta
July 26	San Benedetto Challenger (Italy) San Benedetto, Italy; Clay – $25,000 – 32S/16D; Singles draw – Doubles draw	(Socialist Federal Republic of Yugoslavia) Željko Franulović; 6–4, 6–1	(Romania) Ilie Năstase	(Italy) Luca Bottazzi (United States) Tony Giammalva	(Italy) Massimo Zampieri (Romania) Florin Segărceanu (Italy) Paolo Bertolucci (Czechoslovakia) Pavel Huťka
July 26	San Benedetto Challenger (Italy) San Benedetto, Italy; Clay – $25,000 – 32S/16D; Singles draw – Doubles draw	(Romania) Ilie Năstase (Romania) Florin Segărceanu; 5–7, 7–6, 7–6	(Italy) Gianni Marchetti (Italy) Enzo Vattuone	(Italy) Luca Bottazzi (United States) Tony Giammalva	(Italy) Massimo Zampieri (Romania) Florin Segărceanu (Italy) Paolo Bertolucci (Czechoslovakia) Pavel Huťka

=== August ===
Week of	Tournament	Champions	Runners-up	Semifinalists	Quarterfinalists
August 2	Knokke Challenger (Belgium) Knokke, Belgium; Clay – $50,000 – 32S/16D; Singles draw – Doubles draw	(Czechoslovakia) Tomáš Šmíd; 6–2, 6–2, 6–0	(Socialist Federal Republic of Yugoslavia) Željko Franulović	(Sweden) Per Hjertquist (New Zealand) Bruce Derlin	(Belgium) Bernard Boileau (Zimbabwe) Haroon Ismail (Italy) Gianni Ocleppo (Australia) Wayne Hampson
August 2	Knokke Challenger (Belgium) Knokke, Belgium; Clay – $50,000 – 32S/16D; Singles draw – Doubles draw	(Hungary) Zoltán Kuhárszky (Austria) Hans Kary; 5–7, 6–2, 6–4	(Sweden) Jan Gunnarsson (New Zealand) Jeff Simpson	(Sweden) Per Hjertquist (New Zealand) Bruce Derlin	(Belgium) Bernard Boileau (Zimbabwe) Haroon Ismail (Italy) Gianni Ocleppo (Australia) Wayne Hampson
August 2	Porto Alegre Challenger (Brazil) Porto Alegre, Brazil; Clay – $50,000 – 64S/32D; Singles draw – Doubles draw	(France) Dominique Bedel; 6–2, 3–6, 7–6	(Brazil) Cássio Motta	(United States) Mark Dickson (Argentina) Ricardo Rivera	(Chile) Belus Prajoux (United States) Egan Adams (Spain) Juan Carlos Andrade (Brazil) Ney Keller
August 2	Porto Alegre Challenger (Brazil) Porto Alegre, Brazil; Clay – $50,000 – 64S/32D; Singles draw – Doubles draw	(Brazil) Givaldo Barbosa (Ecuador) Ricardo Ycaza; 6–3, 6–4	(United States) Rocky Royer (Sweden) Magnus Tideman	(United States) Mark Dickson (Argentina) Ricardo Rivera	(Chile) Belus Prajoux (United States) Egan Adams (Spain) Juan Carlos Andrade (Brazil) Ney Keller
August 9	Ostend Challenger (Belgium) Ostend, Belgium; Clay – $25,000 – 32S/16D; Singles draw – Doubles draw	(Czechoslovakia) Libor Pimek; 6–2, 7–5	(Zimbabwe) Haroon Ismail	(Czechoslovakia) Jaroslav Navrátil (South Africa) Derek Tarr	(United Kingdom) Andrew Jarrett (Spain) Miguel Mir (Sweden) Stefan Svensson (Sweden) Jan Gunnarsson
August 9	Ostend Challenger (Belgium) Ostend, Belgium; Clay – $25,000 – 32S/16D; Singles draw – Doubles draw	(United Kingdom) John Feaver (United Kingdom) Andrew Jarrett; 6–2, 6–3	(United States) Joel Bailey (Zimbabwe) Haroon Ismail	(Czechoslovakia) Jaroslav Navrátil (South Africa) Derek Tarr	(United Kingdom) Andrew Jarrett (Spain) Miguel Mir (Sweden) Stefan Svensson (Sweden) Jan Gunnarsson
August 9	Brasília Challenger (Brazil) Brasília, Brazil; Clay – $50,000 – 64S/32D; Singles draw – Doubles draw	(United States) Mark Dickson; 3–6, 6–3, 6–4	(Brazil) Givaldo Barbosa	(Brazil) Cássio Motta (Chile) Belus Prajoux	(Brazil) Ivan Kley (Brazil) Júlio Góes (Argentina) Eduardo Bengoechea (United States) Bruce Kleege
August 9	Brasília Challenger (Brazil) Brasília, Brazil; Clay – $50,000 – 64S/32D; Singles draw – Doubles draw	(Brazil) Givaldo Barbosa (Brazil) João Soares; 6–4, 3–6, 7–6	(Uruguay) José Luis Damiani (Ecuador) Ricardo Ycaza	(Brazil) Cássio Motta (Chile) Belus Prajoux	(Brazil) Ivan Kley (Brazil) Júlio Góes (Argentina) Eduardo Bengoechea (United States) Bruce Kleege
August 16	Le Touquet Challenger (France) Le Touquet, France; Clay – $25,000 – 32S/16D; Singles draw – Doubles draw	(New Zealand) Jeff Simpson; 6–7, 6–2, 6–1	(Switzerland) Roland Stadler	(Argentina) Thomas Stålhandske (United States) Dan Cassidy	(Belgium) Jacques Grandjean (Australia) Peter Johnston (Sweden) Jan Gunnarsson (Australia) Russell Barlow
August 16	Le Touquet Challenger (France) Le Touquet, France; Clay – $25,000 – 32S/16D; Singles draw – Doubles draw	(United Kingdom) John Feaver (Sweden) Jan Gunnarsson; 6–2, 5–7, 6–1	(Australia) David Graham (Australia) Laurie Warder	(Argentina) Thomas Stålhandske (United States) Dan Cassidy	(Belgium) Jacques Grandjean (Australia) Peter Johnston (Sweden) Jan Gunnarsson (Australia) Russell Barlow
August 16	Tarragona Challenger (Spain) Tarragona, Spain; Clay – $25,000 – 32S/16D; Singles draw – Doubles draw	(Spain) Sergio Casal; 5–7, 6–2, 6–4	(Colombia) Jairo Velasco Sr.	(Italy) Francesco Cancellotti (Uruguay) Diego Pérez	(Spain) Roberto Vizcaíno (Spain) Eduardo Osta (Argentina) Martín Jaite (Spain) Alberto Tous
August 16	Tarragona Challenger (Spain) Tarragona, Spain; Clay – $25,000 – 32S/16D; Singles draw – Doubles draw	(United States) Sean Brawley (South Africa) Christo Steyn; 6–3, 6–0	(Spain) Francisco Ferrer (Argentina) Martín Jaite	(Italy) Francesco Cancellotti (Uruguay) Diego Pérez	(Spain) Roberto Vizcaíno (Spain) Eduardo Osta (Argentina) Martín Jaite (Spain) Alberto Tous
August 16	São Paulo-2 Challenger (Brazil) São Paulo, Brazil; Clay – $50,000 – 32S/16D; Singles draw – Doubles draw	(Paraguay) Víctor Pecci; 6–3, 4–6, 6–3	(Spain) José Higueras	(Sweden) Magnus Tideman (Ecuador) Ricardo Ycaza	(France) Dominique Bedel (United States) Mark Dickson (Brazil) Cássio Motta (Peru) Pablo Arraya
August 16	São Paulo-2 Challenger (Brazil) São Paulo, Brazil; Clay – $50,000 – 32S/16D; Singles draw – Doubles draw	(United States) Charles Strode (United States) Morris Strode; 6–1, 6–4	(Peru) Pablo Arraya (Paraguay) Víctor Pecci	(Sweden) Magnus Tideman (Ecuador) Ricardo Ycaza	(France) Dominique Bedel (United States) Mark Dickson (Brazil) Cássio Motta (Peru) Pablo Arraya
August 23	Brussels Challenger (Belgium) Brussels, Belgium; Clay – $25,000 – 32S/16D; Singles draw – Doubles draw	(Sweden) Jan Gunnarsson; 6–4, 6–4	(Spain) Alberto Tous	(Sweden) Jörgen Windahl (Spain) Sergio Casal	(France) Jean-Marc Piacentile (Peru) Fernando Maynetto (Sweden) Stefan Svensson (Belgium) Thierry Stevaux
August 23	Brussels Challenger (Belgium) Brussels, Belgium; Clay – $25,000 – 32S/16D; Singles draw – Doubles draw	(Spain) Alberto Tous (Ecuador) Raúl Viver; 3–6, 6–3, 7–5	(Australia) David Graham (Australia) Laurie Warder	(Sweden) Jörgen Windahl (Spain) Sergio Casal	(France) Jean-Marc Piacentile (Peru) Fernando Maynetto (Sweden) Stefan Svensson (Belgium) Thierry Stevaux
August 23	São Paulo-3 Challenger; São Paulo, Brazil $25,000 – carpet (I) – 32S/16D; Singles draw – Doubles draw	(Brazil) Júlio Góes; 7–5, 6–1	(Brazil) Ney Keller	(Brazil) Marcos Hocevar (Brazil) Nelson Aerts	(Brazil) Edvaldo Oliveira (Brazil) Fernando Roese (Brazil) Givaldo Barbosa (Brazil) Carlos Kirmayr
August 23	São Paulo-3 Challenger; São Paulo, Brazil $25,000 – carpet (I) – 32S/16D; Singles draw – Doubles draw	(Brazil) Thomaz Koch (Brazil) José Schmidt; 6–4, 7–6	(Brazil) Júlio Góes (Brazil) Ney Keller	(Brazil) Marcos Hocevar (Brazil) Nelson Aerts	(Brazil) Edvaldo Oliveira (Brazil) Fernando Roese (Brazil) Givaldo Barbosa (Brazil) Carlos Kirmayr
August 30	No tournaments scheduled.				

=== September ===
Week of	Tournament	Champions	Runners-up	Semifinalists	Quarterfinalists
September 6	International Tournament of Messina (Italy) Messina, Italy; Clay – $25,000 – 32S/16D; Singles draw – Doubles draw	(Peru) Pablo Arraya; 7–5, 6–4	(Bolivia) Mario Martinez	(Italy) Antonio Zugarelli (Spain) Eduardo Osta	(France) Patrice Kuchna (Spain) Miguel Mir (Spain) David de Miguel (Spain) Sergio Casal
September 6	International Tournament of Messina (Italy) Messina, Italy; Clay – $25,000 – 32S/16D; Singles draw – Doubles draw	(Italy) Gianni Marchetti (Italy) Enzo Vattuone; 6–0, 4–6, 6–2	(Spain) Eduardo Osta (Spain) Roberto Vizcaíno	(Italy) Antonio Zugarelli (Spain) Eduardo Osta	(France) Patrice Kuchna (Spain) Miguel Mir (Spain) David de Miguel (Spain) Sergio Casal
September 13	No tournaments scheduled.				
September 20	Thessaloniki Challenger (Greece) Thessaloniki, Greece; Clay – $25,000 – 32S/16D; Singles draw – Doubles draw	(Nigeria) Nduka Odizor; 6–3, 7–6	(Italy) Gianni Ocleppo	(United States) Bruce Foxworth (Israel) David Schneider	(Argentina) Guillermo Aubone (South Africa) Gordon Simmonds (United States) Rodney Crowley (Denmark) Peter Bastiansen
September 20	Thessaloniki Challenger (Greece) Thessaloniki, Greece; Clay – $25,000 – 32S/16D; Singles draw – Doubles draw	(United Kingdom) John Feaver (Nigeria) Nduka Odizor; 7–6, 7–6	(Denmark) Peter Bastiansen (Denmark) Michael Mortensen	(United States) Bruce Foxworth (Israel) David Schneider	(Argentina) Guillermo Aubone (South Africa) Gordon Simmonds (United States) Rodney Crowley (Denmark) Peter Bastiansen
September 27	No tournaments scheduled.				

=== October ===
Week of	Tournament	Champions	Runners-up	Semifinalists	Quarterfinalists
October 4	No tournaments scheduled.				
October 11	No tournaments scheduled.				
October 18	Porto Challenger (Portugal) Porto, Portugal; Clay – $25,000 – 32S/16D; Singles draw – Doubles draw	(Colombia) Jairo Velasco Sr. 6–7, 6–3, 6–3	(Spain) Juan Avendaño	(Spain) José García Requena (France) Christophe Bernelle	(France) Jean-Marc Piacentile (Czechoslovakia) Miloslav Mečíř (Argentina) Andres Molina (Spain) Ricardo Sánchez
October 18	Porto Challenger (Portugal) Porto, Portugal; Clay – $25,000 – 32S/16D; Singles draw – Doubles draw	(Czechoslovakia) Libor Pimek (Belgium) Thierry Stevaux; 4–6, 7–6, 7–5	(United States) Andy Kohlberg (South Africa) Robbie Venter	(Spain) José García Requena (France) Christophe Bernelle	(France) Jean-Marc Piacentile (Czechoslovakia) Miloslav Mečíř (Argentina) Andres Molina (Spain) Ricardo Sánchez
October 25	Sydney Challenger (Australia) Sydney, Australia; Hard – $25,000 – 64S/32D; Singles draw – Doubles draw	(Australia) Pat Cash; 7–5, 6–7, 6–2	(Australia) Craig A. Miller	(Australia) Wally Masur (Australia) Chris Johnstone	(United States) John Benson (Australia) Broderick Dyke (Australia) Cliff Letcher (United States) Rand Evett
October 25	Sydney Challenger (Australia) Sydney, Australia; Hard – $25,000 – 64S/32D; Singles draw – Doubles draw	(Australia) Peter Johnston (Australia) John McCurdy; 6–7, 7–6, 7–6	(United States) John Benson (Australia) Chris Johnstone	(Australia) Wally Masur (Australia) Chris Johnstone	(United States) John Benson (Australia) Broderick Dyke (Australia) Cliff Letcher (United States) Rand Evett

=== November ===
Week of	Tournament	Champions	Runners-up	Semifinalists	Quarterfinalists
November 1	No tournaments scheduled.				
November 8	No tournaments scheduled.				
November 15	No tournaments scheduled.				
November 22	Benin City Challenger (Nigeria) Benin City, Nigeria; Hard – $50,000 – 32S/16D; Singles draw – Doubles draw	(Italy) Gianni Ocleppo; 6–3, 6–3	(Nigeria) Nduka Odizor	(Austria) Robert Reininger (Zimbabwe) Haroon Ismail	(Switzerland) Jakob Hlasek (Nigeria) David Imonitie (United Kingdom) Martin Guntrip (United Kingdom) Colin Dowdeswell
November 22	Benin City Challenger (Nigeria) Benin City, Nigeria; Hard – $50,000 – 32S/16D; Singles draw – Doubles draw	(Austria) Hans Kary (Italy) Gianni Ocleppo; Defaulted	(United Kingdom) Colin Dowdeswell (Zimbabwe) Haroon Ismail	(Austria) Robert Reininger (Zimbabwe) Haroon Ismail	(Switzerland) Jakob Hlasek (Nigeria) David Imonitie (United Kingdom) Martin Guntrip (United Kingdom) Colin Dowdeswell

== Statistical information ==
These tables present the number of singles (S) and doubles (D) titles won by each player and each nation during the season, within all the tournament categories of the 1982 ATP Challenger Series. The players/nations are sorted by: 1) total number of titles (a doubles title won by two players representing the same nation counts as only one win for the nation); 2) a singles > doubles hierarchy; 3) alphabetical order (by family names for players).

=== Titles won by player ===
Total	Player	S	D
5	Dominique Bedel (FRA)	4	1
4	Givaldo Barbosa (BRA)	0	4
4	John Feaver (GBR)	0	4
3	Nduka Odizor (NGR)	2	1
3	Sergio Casal (ESP)	1	2
3	Andrew Jarrett (GBR)	1	2
3	Thomaz Koch (BRA)	1	2
3	Florin Segărceanu (ROU)	1	2
3	João Soares (BRA)	1	2
3	Charles Strode (USA)	0	3
3	Morris Strode (USA)	0	3
2	Mark Dickson (USA)	2	0
2	Pat Cash (AUS)	1	1
2	Júlio Góes (BRA)	1	1
2	Jan Gunnarsson (SWE)	1	1
2	Carlos Kirmayr (BRA)	1	1
2	Karl Meiler (FRG)	1	1
2	Gianni Ocleppo (ITA)	1	1
2	Libor Pimek (TCH)	1	1
2	Danie Visser (RSA)	1	1
2	Brad Guan (AUS)	0	2
2	Hans Kary (AUT)	0	2
2	José Schmidt (BRA)	0	2
1	Pablo Arraya (PER)	1	0
1	Juan Avendaño (ESP)	1	0
1	Corrado Barazzutti (ITA)	1	0
1	Peter Bastiansen (DEN)	1	0
1	Tom Cain (USA)	1	0
1	Eddie Edwards (RSA)	1	0
1	Željko Franulović (YUG)	1	0
1	Haroon Ismail (ZIM)	1	0
1	Wally Masur (AUS)	1	0
1	Scott McCain (USA)	1	0
1	Paul McNamee (AUS)	1	0
1	Víctor Pecci (PAR)	1	0
1	Diego Pérez (URU)	1	0
1	Brent Pirow (RSA)	1	0
1	Rocky Royer (USA)	1	0
1	Jeff Simpson (NZL)	1	0
1	Russell Simpson (NZL)	1	0
1	Tomáš Šmíd (TCH)	1	0
1	Jairo Velasco Sr. (COL)	1	0
1	Mats Wilander (SWE)	1	0
1	Anand Amritraj (IND)	0	1
1	Syd Ball (AUS)	0	1
1	Lloyd Bourne (USA)	0	1
1	Sean Brawley (USA)	0	1
1	Iván Camus (CHI)	0	1
1	John Fitzgerald (AUS)	0	1
1	Mike Gandolfo (USA)	0	1
1	Alejandro Ganzábal (ARG)	0	1
1	Drew Gitlin (USA)	0	1
1	Gustavo Guerrero (ARG)	0	1
1	Peter Johnston (AUS)	0	1
1	Jan Kodeš (TCH)	0	1
1	Zoltan Kuharszky (HUN)	0	1
1	Warren Maher (AUS)	0	1
1	Gianni Marchetti (ITA)	0	1
1	John McCurdy (AUS)	0	1
1	Steve Meister (USA)	0	1
1	Craig A. Miller (AUS)	0	1
1	Matt Mitchell (USA)	0	1
1	Ilie Năstase (ROU)	0	1
1	Jaroslav Navrátil (TCH)	0	1
1	Alejandro Pierola (CHI)	0	1
1	Wolfgang Popp (FRG)	0	1
1	Belus Prajoux (CHI)	0	1
1	Freddie Sauer (RSA)	0	1
1	Roland Stadler (SUI)	0	1
1	Thierry Stevaux (BEL)	0	1
1	Christo Steyn (RSA)	0	1
1	Derek Tarr (RSA)	0	1
1	Magnus Tideman (SWE)	0	1
1	Alberto Tous (ESP)	0	1
1	Gabriel Urpi (ESP)	0	1
1	Schalk van der Merwe (RSA)	0	1
1	Enzo Vattuone (ITA)	0	1
1	Tian Viljoen (RSA)	0	1
1	Raul Viver (ECU)	0	1
1	Jörgen Windahl (SWE)	0	1
1	Craig Wittus (USA)	0	1
1	Ricardo Ycaza (ECU)	0	1
1	Christoph Zipf (FRG)	0	1

=== Titles won by nation ===
Total	Nation	S	D
13	United States (USA)	5	8
11	Brazil (BRA)	4	7
8	Australia (AUS)	3	5
7	South Africa (RSA)	3	4
6	Spain (ESP)	2	4
5	France (FRA)	4	1
5	Czechoslovakia (TCH)	2	3
5	Great Britain (GBR)	1	4
4	Italy (ITA)	2	2
4	Sweden (SWE)	2	2
4	West Germany (FRG)	1	3
3	Nigeria (NGR)	2	1
3	Romania (ROU)	1	2
3	Chile (CHI)	0	3
2	New Zealand (NZL)	2	0
2	Austria (AUT)	0	2
2	Ecuador (ECU)	0	2
1	Colombia (COL)	1	0
1	Denmark (DEN)	1	0
1	Paraguay (PAR)	1	0
1	Peru (PER)	1	0
1	Uruguay (URU)	1	0
1	Yugoslavia (YUG)	1	0
1	Zimbabwe (ZIM)	1	0
1	Argentina (ARG)	0	1
1	Belgium (BEL)	0	1
1	Hungary (HUN)	0	1
1	India (IND)	0	1
1	Switzerland (SUI)	0	1

== See also ==
- 1982 Grand Prix
- Association of Tennis Professionals
- International Tennis Federation
