= 1982 Japan Open Tennis Championships – Men's doubles =

Men's doubles
- 1982 Japan Open Tennis Championships

Final
- Champion: (United States) Sherwood Stewart; (United States) Ferdi Taygan
- Runner-up: (United States) Tim Gullikson; (United States) Tom Gullikson
- Score: 6–1, 3–6, 7–6

Details
- Draw: 32
- Seeds: 8

Events
Singles	men	women
Doubles	men	women
- Japan Open

Balázs Taróczy and Heinz Günthardt were the defending champions, but did not compete this year.

Sherwood Stewart and Ferdi Taygan won the title, defeating Tim Gullikson and Tom Gullikson in the final, 6–1, 3–6, 7–6.

== Seeds ==
1. (United States) Sherwood Stewart / (United States) Ferdi Taygan (champions)
2. (United States) Tim Gullikson / (United States) Tom Gullikson (final)
3. (Paraguay) Francisco González / (United States) Van Winitsky (quarterfinals)
4. (United States) Andy Andrews / (United States) John Sadri (semifinals)
5. (United States) Larry Stefanki / (United States) Robert Van't Hof (quarterfinals)
6. (United States) Charles Strode / (United States) Morris Strode (semifinals)
7. (United States) Marty Davis / (United States) Steve Krulevitz (quarterfinals)
8. (United States) Chris Mayotte / (United States) Craig Wittus (quarterfinals)

== Draw ==
Key

- Q = Qualifier
- WC = Wild card
- LL = Lucky loser
- Alt = Alternate
- ITF = ITF entry
- PR = Protected ranking
- SR = Special ranking
- SE = Special exempt
- JE = Junior exempt
- JR = Junior Accelerator Programme entrant
- CO = College Accelerator Programme entrant
- NG = Next Gen Accelerator Program entrant
- w/o = Walkover
- r = Retired
- d = Defaulted

=== Finals ===
Semifinals
1	(United States) Sherwood Stewart (United States) Ferdi Taygan	7	6
4	(United States) Andy Andrews (United States) John Sadri	6	4
6	(United States) Charles Strode (United States) Morris Strode	3	7	4
2	(United States) Tim Gullikson (United States) Tom Gullikson	6	6	6

Final
1	(United States) Sherwood Stewart (United States) Ferdi Taygan	6	3	7
2	(United States) Tim Gullikson (United States) Tom Gullikson	1	6	6

=== Top half ===
First round
1	(United States) S Stewart (United States) F Taygan	4	7	6
(United States) M Leach (United States) D Schneider	6	6	4
(Japan) T Fukui (Japan) T Yonezawa	6	6
(Japan) H Bamba (Japan) I Nakanishi	3	2
(United States) J Bailey (United States) D Siegler	6	6
(United States) W Evans (United States) A Scheinman	4	1
(United States) G Holroyd (United States) E Sherbeck	5	6
7	(United States) M Davis (United States) S Krulevitz	7	7
4	(United States) A Andrews (United States) J Sadri	7	7
(Australia) H Hansson (Brazil) E Oncins	5	5
(Switzerland) M Günthardt (Philippines) B Sisson	6	6
(Japan) E Takeuchi (Japan) K Tanabe	2	1
(United States) N Brash (New Zealand) D Mustard	7	4	7
(United States) D Dowlen (United States) J Turpin	6	6	6
(France) D Bedel (Italy) G Ocleppo	6	5
5	(United States) L Stefanki (United States) R Van't Hof	7	7

Second round
1	(United States) S Stewart (United States) F Taygan	6	6
(Japan) T Fukui (Japan) T Yonezawa	2	1
(United States) J Bailey (United States) D Siegler	3	3
7	(United States) M Davis (United States) S Krulevitz	6	6
4	(United States) A Andrews (United States) J Sadri	6	7
(Switzerland) M Günthardt (Philippines) B Sisson	4	6
(United States) N Brash (New Zealand) D Mustard	3	6
5	(United States) L Stefanki (United States) R Van't Hof	6	7

Quarterfinals
1	(United States) S Stewart (United States) F Taygan	7	6
7	(United States) M Davis (United States) S Krulevitz	6	3
4	(United States) A Andrews (United States) J Sadri	4	7	6
5	(United States) L Stefanki (United States) R Van't Hof	6	5	4

Semifinals
1	(United States) S Stewart (United States) F Taygan	7	6
4	(United States) A Andrews (United States) J Sadri	6	4

=== Bottom half ===
First round
6	(United States) C Strode (United States) M Strode	6	6
(Japan) T Shibuya (Japan) M Suishu	3	4
(United States) J Arias (United States) B Gilbert	2	7	6
(United States) R Crowley (United States) R Evett	6	6	2
(United States) J Hoffman (United States) D Pate	6	6
(Japan) K Hirai (Japan) S Nishio	2	4
(Hungary) Z Kuhárszky (Switzerland) R Stadler	3	5
3	(Paraguay) F González (United States) V Winitsky	6	7
8	(United States) C Mayotte (United States) C Wittus	6	6
(Canada) B Cowan (Canada) G Michibata	2	4
(India) S Menon (United States) W Redondo	2	6	7
(United States) C Leeds (United States) T Waltke	6	3	5
(United States) P Dupre (United States) D Gitlin	6	6
(United States) M Brunnberg (United States) B Kleege	3	4
(Australia) A Gardiner (Japan) H Shirato	7	5	4
2	(United States) T Gullikson (United States) T Gullikson	6	7	6

Second round
6	(United States) C Strode (United States) M Strode	6	6	6
(United States) J Arias (United States) B Gilbert	4	7	4
(United States) J Hoffman (United States) D Pate	2	3
3	(Paraguay) F González (United States) V Winitsky	6	6
8	(United States) C Mayotte (United States) C Wittus	6	3	6
(India) S Menon (United States) W Redondo	3	6	3
(United States) P Dupre (United States) D Gitlin	4	6	4
2	(United States) T Gullikson (United States) T Gullikson	6	4	6

Quarterfinals
6	(United States) C Strode (United States) M Strode	6	3	6
3	(Paraguay) F González (United States) V Winitsky	4	6	4
8	(United States) C Mayotte (United States) C Wittus	5	4
2	(United States) T Gullikson (United States) T Gullikson	7	6

Semifinals
6	(United States) C Strode (United States) M Strode	3	7	4
2	(United States) T Gullikson (United States) T Gullikson	6	6	6
