= 1982 Japan Open Tennis Championships – Men's singles =

Men's singles
- 1982 Japan Open Tennis Championships

Final
- Champion: (United States) Jimmy Arias
- Runner-up: (France) Dominique Bedel
- Score: 6–2, 2–6, 6–4

Details
- Draw: 64 (8Q)
- Seeds: 16

Events
Singles	men	women
Doubles	men	women
- Japan Open

Balázs Taróczy was the defending champion, but did not participate this year.

Jimmy Arias won the title, defeating Dominique Bedel in the final, 6–2, 2–6, 6–4.

== Seeds ==
1. (United States) Jimmy Arias (champion)
2. (United States) Van Winitsky (second round)
3. (United States) Tim Gullikson (second round)
4. (West Germany) Andreas Maurer (second round)
5. (United States) Robert Van't Hof (second round)
6. (France) Dominique Bedel (final)
7. (United States) Pat DuPré (third round)
8. (United States) Tom Gullikson (second round)
9. (Hungary) Zoltán Kuhárszky (first round)
10. (United States) Peter Rennert (third round)
11. (United States) Brad Gilbert (third round)
12. (United States) Marty Davis (third round)
13. (United States) Andy Andrews (quarterfinals)
14. (United States) Trey Waltke (second round)
15. (United States) Larry Stefanki (first round)
16. (United States) Rocky Royer (second round)

== Draw ==
Key

- Q = Qualifier
- WC = Wild card
- LL = Lucky loser
- Alt = Alternate
- ITF = ITF entry
- PR = Protected ranking
- SR = Special ranking
- SE = Special exempt
- JE = Junior exempt
- JR = Junior Accelerator Programme entrant
- CO = College Accelerator Programme entrant
- NG = Next Gen Accelerator Program entrant
- w/o = Walkover
- r = Retired
- d = Defaulted

=== Finals ===
Quarterfinals
1	(United States) Jimmy Arias	6	6
(Italy) Gianni Ocleppo	4	4
13	(United States) Andy Andrews	7	1	4
(Paraguay) Francisco González	5	6	6
(United States) Charles Strode	4	4
(India) Sashi Menon	6	6
6	(France) Dominique Bedel	6	6
(Canada) Glenn Michibata	2	4

Semifinals
1	(United States) Jimmy Arias	7	6
(Paraguay) Francisco González	5	1
(India) Sashi Menon	3	4
6	(France) Dominique Bedel	6	6

Final
1	(United States) Jimmy Arias	6	2	6
6	(France) Dominique Bedel	2	6	4

=== Top half ===
==== Section 1 ====
First round
1	(United States) J Arias	6	6
(United States) C Leeds	3	4
(United States) M Leach	6	6
(United States) N Brash	1	4
(Japan) T Fukui	3	4
(United States) M Strode	6	6
Q	(Japan) T Yonezawa	1	7	6
15	(United States) L Stefanki	6	6	3
9	(Hungary) Z Kuhárszky	6	6
(Italy) G Ocleppo	7	7
(United States) D Siegler	6	6
Q	(Japan) M Suishu	4	3
Q	(Japan) K Tanabe	2	4
(Israel) D Schneider	6	6
(United States) F Taygan	2	6
7	(United States) P DuPré	6	7

Second round
1	(United States) J Arias	6	6
(United States) M Leach	4	4
(United States) M Strode	3	6
Q	(Japan) T Yonezawa	6	7
(Italy) G Ocleppo	0	6	6
(United States) D Siegler	6	4	2
(Israel) D Schneider	6	4	3
7	(United States) P DuPré	2	6	6

Third round
1	(United States) J Arias	6	6
Q	(Japan) T Yonezawa	3	4
(Italy) G Ocleppo	6	6
7	(United States) P DuPré	3	1

Quarterfinals
1	(United States) J Arias	6	6
(Italy) G Ocleppo	4	4

==== Section 2 ====
First round
4	(West Germany) A Maurer	7	1	6
Q	(Soviet Union) K Pugaev	6	6	1
Q	(Australia) H Hansson	2	4
(United States) B Kleege	6	6
(United States) D Pate	4	5
(United States) M Brunnberg	6	7
(United States) R Evett	0	6	6
13	(United States) A Andrews	6	0	7
11	(United States) B Gilbert	6	6
(United States) W Redondo	1	2
Q	(United States) E Sherbeck	6	6
(Japan) S Nishio	1	3
(Paraguay) F González	6	6
(Japan) K Sayama	3	3
(Brazil) E Oncins	2	0
5	(United States) R Van't Hof	6	6

Second round
4	(West Germany) A Maurer	6	7	3
(United States) B Kleege	7	5	6
(United States) M Brunnberg	4	2
13	(United States) A Andrews	6	6
11	(United States) B Gilbert	6	6
Q	(United States) E Sherbeck	2	1
(Paraguay) F González	6	6
5	(United States) R Van't Hof	4	0

Third round
(United States) B Kleege	5	1
13	(United States) A Andrews	7	6
11	(United States) B Gilbert	6	2
(Paraguay) F González	7	6

Quarterfinals
13	(United States) A Andrews	7	1	4
(Paraguay) F González	5	6	6

=== Bottom half ===
==== Section 3 ====
First round
8	(United States) T Gullikson	6	6
(United States) S Stewart	2	1
(United States) C Mayotte	6	2	3
(United States) C Strode	2	6	6
Q	(Japan) J Kuki	6	6
(Japan) K Maruyama	0	2
(United States) D Dowlen	6	2
10	(United States) P Rennert	7	6
12	(United States) M Davis	6	6
(United States) G Holroyd	4	4
(Switzerland) I Dupasquier	6	6	2
(Switzerland) M Günthardt	7	3	6
(Italy) F Cancellotti	2	6	0
(India) S Menon	6	3	6
(Switzerland) R Stadler	6	2	2
3	(United States) T Gullikson	4	6	6

Second round
8	(United States) T Gullikson	6	3	6
(United States) C Strode	3	6	7
Q	(Japan) J Kuki	6	2	5
10	(United States) P Rennert	3	6	7
12	(United States) M Davis	6	6
(Switzerland) M Günthardt	3	3
(India) S Menon	6	4	7
3	(United States) T Gullikson	2	6	6

Third round
(United States) C Strode	7	6
10	(United States) P Rennert	6	4
12	(United States) M Davis	4	5
(India) S Menon	6	7

Quarterfinals
(United States) C Strode	4	4
(India) S Menon	6	6

==== Section 4 ====
First round
6	(France) D Bedel	6	6
(United States) S Meister	3	0
(United States) C Wittus	6	6
(United States) J Hoffman	0	3
(United States) D Gitlin	6	6
(New Zealand) D Mustard	2	0
(Japan) H Shirato	2	6
14	(United States) T Waltke	6	7
16	(United States) R Royer	7	7
(Canada) B Cowan	6	6
Q	(United States) J Turpin	7	6
(United States) S Krulevitz	6	4
(Canada) G Michibata	3	6	6
(United States) J Bailey	6	1	2
(Japan) Y Nakamura	4	5
2	(United States) V Winitsky	6	7

Second round
6	(France) D Bedel	3	7	6
(United States) C Wittus	6	6	4
(United States) D Gitlin	1	6	6
14	(United States) T Waltke	6	1	2
16	(United States) R Royer	3	6
Q	(United States) J Turpin	6	7
(Canada) G Michibata	6	5	6
2	(United States) V Winitsky	3	7	3

Third round
6	(France) D Bedel	3	6	6
(United States) D Gitlin	6	1	4
Q	(United States) J Turpin	2	1
(Canada) G Michibata	6	6

Quarterfinals
6	(France) D Bedel	6	6
(Canada) G Michibata	2	4
