= 1983 Japan Open Tennis Championships – Men's singles =

Men's singles
- 1983 Japan Open Tennis Championships

Final
- Champion: (United States) Eliot Teltscher
- Runner-up: (Ecuador) Andrés Gómez
- Score: 7–5, 3–6, 6–1

Details
- Draw: 64 (7 Q )
- Seeds: 16

Events
| Singles | men | women |
| Doubles | men | women |
| ← 1982 · | Japan Open | · 1984 → |

Jimmy Arias was the defending champion, but did not participate this year.

Eliot Teltscher won the title, defeating Andrés Gómez in the final, 7–5, 3–6, 6–1.

== Seeds ==
1. (Ecuador) Andrés Gómez (final)
2. (United States) Eliot Teltscher (champion)
3. (France) Henri Leconte (third round)
4. (United States) Robert Van't Hof (second round)
5. (Italy) Gianni Ocleppo (quarterfinals)
6. (Sweden) Thomas Högstedt (second round)
7. (United States) Scott Davis (second round)
8. (France) Christophe Roger-Vasselin (quarterfinals)
9. (United States) Sammy Giammalva Jr. (second round)
10. (United States) Mike De Palmer (third round)
11. (United States) Brad Gilbert (third round)
12. (Paraguay) Francisco González (first round)
13. (United States) Pat DuPré (first round)
14. (United States) Tom Gullikson (semifinals)
15. (France) Thierry Tulasne (first round)
16. (Nigeria) Nduka Odizor (first round)

== Draw ==
=== Key ===
- Q = Qualifier
- WC = Wild card
- LL = Lucky loser
- Alt = Alternate
- ITF = ITF entry
- PR = Protected ranking
- SR = Special ranking
- SE = Special exempt
- JE = Junior exempt
- JR = Junior Accelerator Programme entrant
- CO = College Accelerator Programme entrant
- NG = Next Gen Accelerator Program entrant
- w/o = Walkover
- r = Retired
- d = Defaulted

=== Finals ===
Semifinals
1 | (Ecuador) Andrés Gómez | 6 | 6
14 | (United States) Tom Gullikson | 3 | 2
(United States) Tim Gullikson | 1 | 6 | 2
2 | (United States) Eliot Teltscher | 6 | 4 | 6

Final
1 | (Ecuador) Andrés Gómez | 5 | 6 | 1
2 | (United States) Eliot Teltscher | 7 | 3 | 6

=== Top half ===
==== Section 1 ====
First round
1 | (Ecuador) A Gómez | 7 | 6
(United States) J Bailey | 5 | 3
Q | (Japan) T Kuramitsu | 2 | 1
(United States) V Winitsky | 6 | 6
(Australia) B Dyke | 0 | 6 | 1
(United States) M Freeman | 6 | 2 | 6
(United States) B Kleege | 3 | 6
11 | (United States) B Gilbert | 6 | 7
16 | (Nigeria) N Odizor | 2 | 6
(Australia) Craig Miller | 6 | 7
(United States) M Davis | 2 | 5
(United States) S Meister | 6 | 7
(Japan) H Shirato | 0 | 2
(India) R Krishnan | 6 | 6
Q | (Australia) L Warder | 2 | 4
6 | (Sweden) T Högstedt | 6 | 6

Second round
1 | (Ecuador) A Gómez | 6 | 7
(United States) V Winitsky | 3 | 6
(United States) M Freeman | 4 | 3
11 | (United States) B Gilbert | 6 | 6
(Australia) Craig Miller | 7 | 1 | 4
(United States) S Meister | 6 | 6 | 6
(India) R Krishnan | 3 | 6 | 1
6 | (Sweden) T Högstedt | 6 | 3 | 1

Third round
1 | (Ecuador) A Gómez | 6 | 7
11 | (United States) B Gilbert | 2 | 5
(United States) S Meister | 3 | 2
(India) R Krishnan | 6 | 6

Quarterfinals
1 | (Ecuador) A Gómez | 6 | 7
(India) R Krishnan | 2 | 5

==== Section 2 ====
First round
4 | (United States) R Van't Hof | 7 | 6
(United States) J Austin | 5 | 3
(United States) C Strode | 7 | 6
(United States) M Anger | 6 | 4
(United States) P Rennert | 4 | 0^{r}
(Australia) R Frawley | 6 | 1
(Japan) T Yonezawa | 2 | 4
14 | (United States) To Gullikson | 6 | 6
10 | (United States) M De Palmer | 7 | 6
(Japan) T Fukui | 5 | 2
(United States) J Levine | 3 | 7 | 1
(United States) T Cain | 6 | 6 | 6
(United States) T Waltke | 6 | 2 | 6
(United States) J Gurfein | 2 | 6 | 7
(Japan) S Shiraishi | 6 | 3 | 1
8 | (France) C Roger-Vasselin | 4 | 6 | 6

Second round
4 | (United States) R Van't Hof | 4 | 6 | 6
(United States) C Strode | 6 | 4 | 7
(Australia) R Frawley | 7 | 3 | 6
14 | (United States) To Gullikson | 6 | 6 | 7
10 | (United States) M De Palmer | 6 | 3 | 6
(United States) T Cain | 2 | 6 | 3
(United States) J Gurfein | 7 | 6 | 3
8 | (France) C Roger-Vasselin | 6 | 7 | 6

Third round
(United States) C Strode | 4 | 6 | 4
14 | (United States) To Gullikson | 6 | 3 | 6
10 | (United States) M De Palmer | 6 | 5 | 2
8 | (France) C Roger-Vasselin | 3 | 7 | 6

Quarterfinals
14 | (United States) To Gullikson | 6 | 7
8 | (France) C Roger-Vasselin | 3 | 5

==== Section 3 ====
First round
5 | (Italy) G Ocleppo | 6 | 6
(Japan) S Sakamoto | 2 | 4
(West Germany) R Gehring | 6 | 7
(United States) MS Strode | 1 | 5
(Australia) W Hampson | 6 | 2
(United States) T Nelson | 7 | 6
Q | (United States) D Dowlen | 3 | 2
9 | (United States) S Giammalva, Jr | 6 | 6
12 | (Paraguay) F González | 6 | 5
(United States) Ti Gullikson | 7 | 7
(Japan) S Nishio | 4 | 4
Q | (United States) K Flach | 6 | 6
(Sweden) M Tideman | 1 | 0
Q | (United States) S McCain | 6 | 6
(United States) S Brawley | 3 | 0
3 | (France) H Leconte | 6 | 6

Second round
5 | (Italy) G Ocleppo | 6 | 7 | 6
(West Germany) R Gehring | 7 | 6 | 4
(United States) T Nelson | 6 | 6
9 | (United States) S Giammalva, Jr | 2 | 3
(United States) Ti Gullikson | 6 | 6
Q | (United States) K Flach | 3 | 1
Q | (United States) S McCain | 4 | 6
3 | (France) H Leconte | 6 | 7

Third round
5 | (Italy) G Ocleppo | 6 | 6
(United States) T Nelson | 4 | 3
(United States) Ti Gullikson | 6 | 6
3 | (France) H Leconte | 4 | 2

Quarterfinals
5 | (Italy) G Ocleppo | 6 | 2 | 2
(United States) Ti Gullikson | 1 | 6 | 6

==== Section 4 ====
First round
7 | (United States) S Davis | 6 | 7
Q | (United States) M Vines | 1 | 5
(United States) L Stefanki | 3 | 6 | 6
(Canada) G Michibata | 6 | 3 | 4
Q | (United States) R Seguso | 6 | 6 | 6
(United States) R Meyer | 3 | 7 | 4
(United States) D Pate | 6 | 6
13 | (United States) P DuPré | 4 | 4
15 | (France) T Tulasne | 6 | 6
(France) G Goven | 7 | 7
(United States) V Amaya | 3 | 7 | 6
(United States) G Holmes | 6 | 6 | 2
(United States) L Bourne | 7 | 0 | 2
(India) S Menon | 6 | 6 | 6
(United States) A Andrews | 1 | 3
2 | (United States) E Teltscher | 6 | 6

Second round
7 | (United States) S Davis | 6 | 4
(United States) L Stefanki | 7 | 6
Q | (United States) R Seguso | 7 | 7
(United States) D Pate | 6 | 5
(France) G Goven | 6 | 3 | 6
(United States) V Amaya | 3 | 6 | 1
(India) S Menon | 0 | 1
2 | (United States) E Teltscher | 6 | 6

Third round
(United States) L Stefanki | 6 | 6 | 7
Q | (United States) R Seguso | 3 | 7 | 6
(France) G Goven | 1 | 1
2 | (United States) E Teltscher | 6 | 6

Quarterfinals
(United States) L Stefanki | 2 | 3
2 | (United States) E Teltscher | 6 | 6
