= 1983 Japan Open Tennis Championships – Men's doubles =

Men's doubles
- 1983 Japan Open Tennis Championships

Final
- Champions: (United States) Sammy Giammalva Jr. (United States) Steve Meister
- Runners-up: (United States) Tim Gullikson (United States) Tom Gullikson
- Score: 6–4, 6–7, 7–6

Details
- Draw: 32
- Seeds: 8

Events
Singles	men	women
Doubles	men	women
← 1982 ·	Japan Open	· 1984 →

Ferdi Taygan and Sherwood Stewart were the defending champions, but none competed this year.

Sammy Giammalva Jr. and Steve Meister won the title by defeating Tim Gullikson and Tom Gullikson 6–4, 6–7, 7–6 in the final.

== Seeds ==
1. (United States) Tim Gullikson / (United States) Tom Gullikson (final)
2. (Paraguay) Francisco González / (United States) Van Winitsky (second round)
3. (United States) Andy Andrews / (United States) Eliot Teltscher (second round)
4. (France) Henri Leconte / (Australia) Craig A. Miller (quarterfinals)
5. (Australia) Broderick Dyke / (Australia) Rod Frawley (semifinals)
6. (United States) David Dowlen / (Nigeria) Nduka Odizor (second round)
7. (Australia) David Graham / (Australia) Laurie Warder (semifinals)
8. (United States) Sammy Giammalva Jr. / (United States) Steve Meister (champions)

== Draw ==
=== Key ===
- Q = Qualifier
- WC = Wild card
- LL = Lucky loser
- Alt = Alternate
- SE = Special exempt
- PR = Protected ranking
- ITF = ITF entry
- JE = Junior exempt
- w/o = Walkover
- r = Retired
- d = Defaulted
- SR = Special ranking

=== Finals ===
Semifinals
1	(United States) Tim Gullikson (United States) Tom Gullikson	6	2	7
7	(Australia) David Graham (Australia) Laurie Warder	1	6	6
8	(United States) Sammy Giammalva Jr. (United States) Steve Meister	7	6
5	(Australia) Broderick Dyke (Australia) Rod Frawley	6	3

Final
1	(United States) Tim Gullikson (United States) Tom Gullikson	4	7	6
8	(United States) Sammy Giammalva Jr. (United States) Steve Meister	6	6	7

=== Top half ===
First round
1	(United States) Ti Gullikson (United States) To Gullikson	6	6
(Japan) S Nishio (Japan) S Sakamoto	4	1
(United States) M Davis (Australia) W Hampson	6	2	6
(United States) K Flach (United States) R Seguso	4	6	4
(Ecuador) A Gómez (Italy) G Ocleppo	6	6
(United States) B Gilbert (United States) R Meyer	3	4
(United States) V Amaya (United States) H Pfister	7	3	6
6	(United States) D Dowlen (Nigeria) N Odizor	6	6	7
4	(France) H Leconte (Australia) CA Miller	7	7
(United States) M Anger (United States) G Holmes	5	6
(Japan) H Shirato (Japan) T Yonezawa	6	6
(Japan) T Fukui (Japan) Nobuya Tamura	4	3
(United States) J Bailey (United States) B Kleege	7	6
(United States) J Mattke (United States) M Vines	6	3
(United States) C Strode (United States) M Strode	4	6	4
7	(Australia) D Graham (Australia) L Warder	6	4	6

Second round
1	(United States) Ti Gullikson (United States) To Gullikson	7	6
(United States) M Davis (Australia) W Hampson	6	3
(Ecuador) A Gómez (Italy) G Ocleppo	6	6
6	(United States) D Dowlen (Nigeria) N Odizor	3	4
4	(France) H Leconte (Australia) CA Miller	6	6
(Japan) H Shirato (Japan) T Yonezawa	4	2
(United States) J Bailey (United States) B Kleege	3	7	4
7	(Australia) D Graham (Australia) L Warder	6	6	6

Quarterfinals
1	(United States) Ti Gullikson (United States) To Gullikson	6	6	6
(Ecuador) A Gómez (Italy) G Ocleppo	7	1	1
4	(France) H Leconte (Australia) CA Miller	4	6
7	(Australia) D Graham (Australia) L Warder	6	7

Semifinals
1	(United States) Ti Gullikson (United States) To Gullikson	6	2	7
7	(Australia) D Graham (Australia) L Warder	1	6	6

=== Bottom half ===
First round
8	(United States) S Giammalva Jr. (United States) S Meister	7	7
(United States) J Austin (United States) S McCain	6	5
(Sweden) T Högstedt (Sweden) M Tideman	6	0	6
(United States) P DuPré (United States) M Freeman	4	6	2
(United States) T Cain (United States) M De Palmer	7	6
(France) G Goven (France) C Roger-Vasselin	6	4
(United States) J Gurfein (Canada) G Michibata	6	4	4
3	(United States) A Andrews (United States) E Teltscher	3	6	6
5	(Australia) B Dyke (Australia) R Frawley	6	7
(India) S Menon (United States) D Pate	4	6
(United States) L Stefanki (United States) R Van't Hof	7	7
(United States) L Bourne (United States) T Waltke	5	5
(United States) S Brawley (United States) S Davis	6	7
(India) R Krishnan (United States) B Schultz	4	6
(United States) E Adams (United States) E Sherbeck	2	2
2	(Paraguay) F González (United States) V Winitsky	6	6

Second round
8	(United States) S Giammalva Jr. (United States) S Meister	6	6	6
(Sweden) T Högstedt (Sweden) M Tideman	3	7	4
(United States) T Cain (United States) M De Palmer	6	4	7
3	(United States) A Andrews (United States) E Teltscher	3	6	6
5	(Australia) B Dyke (Australia) R Frawley	4	6	6
(United States) L Stefanki (United States) R Van't Hof	6	4	2
(United States) S Brawley (United States) S Davis	7	1	7
2	(Paraguay) F González (United States) V Winitsky	6	6	6

Quarterfinals
8	(United States) S Giammalva Jr. (United States) S Meister	5
(United States) T Cain (United States) M De Palmer	2^{r}
5	(Australia) B Dyke (Australia) R Frawley	6	3	7
(United States) S Brawley (United States) S Davis	3	6	6

Semifinals
8	(United States) S Giammalva Jr. (United States) S Meister	7	6
5	(Australia) B Dyke (Australia) R Frawley	6	3
