= 1983 Japan Open Tennis Championships =

- Date: 17–23 October
- Edition: 10th
- Surface: Hard / outdoor
- Location: Tokyo, Japan

Champions

Men's singles
- (United States) Eliot Teltscher

Women's singles
- (Japan) Etsuko Inoue

Men's doubles
- (United States) Sammy Giammalva Jr. / (United States) Steve Meister

Women's doubles
- (Australia) Chris O'Neil / (Australia) Pam Whytcross
← 1982 ·	Japan Open	· 1984 →

The 1983 Japan Open Tennis Championships was a combined men's and women's tennis tournament played on outdoor hard courts in Tokyo, Japan that was part of the 1983 Virginia Slims World Championship Series and the 1983 Volvo Grand Prix. The tournament was held from 17 October through 23 October 1983. Eliot Teltscher and Etsuko Inoue won the singles titles.

== Finals ==
=== Men's singles ===
(United States) Eliot Teltscher defeated (Ecuador) Andrés Gómez 7–5, 3–6, 6–1

- It was Teltscher's 1st title of the year and the 11th of his career.

=== Women's singles ===
(Japan) Etsuko Inoue defeated (United States) Shelley Solomon 7–5, 6–2

- It was Inoue's 1st career title.

=== Men's doubles ===
(United States) Sammy Giammalva Jr. / (United States) Steve Meister defeated (United States) Tim Gullikson / (United States) Tom Gullikson 6–4, 6–7, 7–6

=== Women's doubles ===
(Australia) Chris O'Neil / (Australia) Pam Whytcross defeated (United States) Helena Manset / (United States) Micki Schillig 6–3, 7–5

- It was O'Neil's 1st title of the year and the 2nd of her career. It was Whytcross' 3rd title of the year and of her career.
