= Prajoux =

Prajoux is a surname. Notable people with the surname include:

- Belus Prajoux (born 1955), Chile tennisman
- Margriet Prajoux-Bouma (1912–2005), Dutch alpine skier
