= José Schmidt =

Brazilian tennis player

- Full name: José Carlos Schmidt
- Country (sports): Brazil

Singles
- Career record: 41–50
- Career titles: 1
- Highest ranking: No. 360 (12 December 1976)

Grand Slam singles results
- Wimbledon: Q1 (1977)

Doubles
- Career record: 4–4
- Highest ranking: No. 82 (3 January 1983)
Medal record
Pan American Games
Bronze medal – third place	1975 Mexico City	Men's doubles

José Carlos Schmidt, also known as Zeca Schmidt, is a Brazilian former professional tennis player.

Schmidt, who played collegiate tennis at Florida State University, won a bronze medal for Brazil at the 1975 Pan American Games, partnering João Soares in the men's doubles. The same year he won the Pensacola Invitational tournament.

While competing on the professional tour he won three Challenger doubles titles with Thomaz Koch and the pair were doubles finalists at a Grand Prix tournament in Itaparica in 1982, but had to retire in the second set. His career high doubles ranking was 82 in the world.

Brazilian Davis Cup player Ricardo Bernd is his cousin.

== Grand Prix career finals ==
=== Doubles: 1 (0–1) ===
Result	W-L	Date	Tournament	Surface	Partner	Opponents	Score
Loss	0–1	Nov 1982	Itaparica, Brazil	Carpet	(Brazil) Thomaz Koch	(Brazil) Givaldo Barbosa (Brazil) João Soares	6–7, 1–2, RET.

== Challenger titles ==
=== Doubles: (3) ===
No.	Year	Tournament	Surface	Partner	Opponents	Score
1.	1982	Campos, Brazil	Clay	(Brazil) Thomaz Koch	(Brazil) Givaldo Barbosa (Brazil) João Soares	6–2, 6–7, 7–6
2.	1982	São Paulo, Brazil	Carpet	(Brazil) Thomaz Koch	(Brazil) Julio Goes (Brazil) Ney Keller	6–4, 7–6
3.	1983	Campos, Brazil	Hard	(Brazil) Thomaz Koch	(Brazil) Júlio Góes (Brazil) Ney Keller	7–6, 6–2

== ILTF finals ==
=== Singles: (1) ===
No.	Year	Tournament	Surface	Opponents	Score
1.	1975	Pensacola Invitational, US	Clay	(Brazil) Ricardo Bernd	6–4, 7–6
