= 1982 Japan Open Tennis Championships – Women's singles =

Women's singles
- 1982 Japan Open Tennis Championships

Final
- Champion: (Peru) Laura Arraya
- Runner-up: (Peru) Pilar Vásquez
- Score: 3–6, 6–4, 6–0

Details
- Draw: 32 (4Q/1LL)
- Seeds: 8

Events
Singles	men	women
Doubles	men	women
- Japan Open

Marie Pinterová was the defending champion, but she chose to compete in the doubles tournament at Stuttgart during the same week.

Laura Arraya won the title by defeating Pilar Vásquez 3–6, 6–4, 6–0 in the final.

== Seeds ==
1. (United States) Kate Latham (second round)
2. (United States) Lisa Bonder (semifinals)
3. (United States) Dana Gilbert (second round)
4. (Peru) Laura Arraya (champion)
5. (United States) Julie Harrington (first round)
6. (United States) Barbara Jordan (first round)
7. (Netherlands) Marianne van der Torre (first round)
8. (United States) Kim Steinmetz (first round)

== Draw ==
Key

- Q = Qualifier
- WC = Wild card
- LL = Lucky loser
- Alt = Alternate
- ITF = ITF entry
- PR = Protected ranking
- SR = Special ranking
- SE = Special exempt
- JE = Junior exempt
- JR = Junior Accelerator Programme entrant
- CO = College Accelerator Programme entrant
- NG = Next Gen Accelerator Program entrant
- w/o = Walkover
- r = Retired
- d = Defaulted

=== Finals ===
Semifinals
(Australia) Pam Whytcross	4	0
(Peru) Pilar Vásquez	6	6
4	(Peru) Laura Arraya	6	6
2	(United States) Lisa Bonder	1	3

Final
(Peru) Pilar Vásquez	6	4	0
4	(Peru) Laura Arraya	3	6	6

=== Top half ===
First round
1	(United States) K Latham	6	6
(Australia) B Remilton	3	2
(Japan) E Inoue	7	6
(Australia) S McInerney	5	3
(Australia) E Smylie	6	5	4
(West Germany) H Eisterlehner	4	7	6
(Australia) P Whytcross	7	6
7	(Netherlands) M van der Torre	6	2
3	(United States) D Gilbert	6	6
(Netherlands) N Schutte	2	2
(Peru) P Vásquez	6	6
(Italy) P Murgo	0	1
Q	(Soviet Union) Natalya Borodina	6	6	5
LL	(Hong Kong) E Lightbody	3	7	7
Q	(Japan) M Yanagi	6	7
5	(United States) J Harrington	2	5

Second round
1	(United States) K Latham	7	4	2
(Japan) E Inoue	6	6	6
(West Germany) H Eisterlehner	4	3
(Australia) P Whytcross	6	6
3	(United States) D Gilbert	6	6	6
(Peru) P Vásquez	2	7	7
LL	(Hong Kong) E Lightbody	4	1
Q	(Japan) M Yanagi	6	6

Quarterfinals
(Japan) E Inoue	4	1
(Australia) P Whytcross	6	6
(Peru) P Vásquez	6	6
Q	(Japan) M Yanagi	2	2

Semifinals
(Australia) P Whytcross	4	0
(Peru) P Vásquez	6	6

=== Bottom half ===
First round
6	(United States) B Jordan	4	4
Q	(United Kingdom) K Brasher	6	6
(United States) L duPont	6	6
(United States) S Rimes	4	4
(United States) S Margolin	2	1
Q	(West Germany) M Schropp	6	6
(United States) S Solomon	6	4	6
4	(Peru) L Arraya	3	6	7
8	(United States) K Steinmetz	6	1	5
(United States) P Blackwell	3	6	7
(Sweden) C Jexell	6	3	7
(Australia) B Randall	3	6	6
(United States) T Lewis	6	3	4
(United States) B Bramblett	4	6	6
(Japan) E Okagawa	0	1
2	(United States) L Bonder	6	6

Second round
Q	(United Kingdom) K Brasher	6	3	2
(United States) L duPont	4	6	6
Q	(West Germany) M Schropp	3	5
4	(Peru) L Arraya	6	7
(United States) P Blackwell	3	4
(Sweden) C Jexell	6	6
(United States) B Bramblett	0	2
2	(United States) L Bonder	6	6

Quarterfinals
(United States) L duPont	4	1
4	(Peru) L Arraya	6	6
(Sweden) C Jexell	6	2	4
2	(United States) L Bonder	3	6	6

Semifinals
4	(Peru) L Arraya	6	6
2	(United States) L Bonder	1	3
