= 1982 Japan Open Tennis Championships – Women's doubles =

Women's doubles
- 1982 Japan Open Tennis Championships

Final
- Champions: (United States) Laura duPont (United States) Barbara Jordan
- Runners-up: (Japan) Naoko Sato (Australia) Brenda Remilton
- Score: 6–2, 6–7, 6–1

Details
- Draw: 16
- Seeds: 4

Events
Singles	men	women
Doubles	men	women
- Japan Open

Patricia Medrado and Cláudia Monteiro were the defending champions, but none competed this year. Medrado chose to compete at Stuttgart during the same week.

Laura duPont and Barbara Jordan won the title by defeating Naoko Sato and Brenda Remilton 6–2, 6–7, 6–1 in the final.

== Seeds ==
1. (United States) Laura duPont / (United States) Barbara Jordan (champions)
2. (Australia) Pam Whytcross / (United States) Sheila McInerney (first round)
3. (Japan) Naoko Sato / (Australia) Brenda Remilton (final)
4. (United States) Julie Harrington / (United States) Trey Lewis (first round)

== Draw ==
Key

- Q = Qualifier
- WC = Wild card
- LL = Lucky loser
- Alt = Alternate
- ITF = ITF entry
- PR = Protected ranking
- SR = Special ranking
- SE = Special exempt
- JE = Junior exempt
- JR = Junior Accelerator Programme entrant
- CO = College Accelerator Programme entrant
- NG = Next Gen Accelerator Program entrant
- w/o = Walkover
- r = Retired
- d = Defaulted

=== Draw ===
First round
1	(United States) L duPont (United States) B Jordan	6	6
(Peru) L Arraya (Peru) P Vásquez	2	2
(Australia) B Randall (Australia) E Sayers	6	6
(Japan) M Yanagi (Japan) E Inoue	2	2
4	(United States) J Harrington (United States) T Lewis	6	1	3
(United States) K Latham (United States) D Gilbert	4	6	6
(United States) K Steinmetz (United States) Shannon Gordon	7	6
(United States) P Louie (United States) B Bramblett	5	1
(Netherlands) M van der Torre (Netherlands) N Schutte	6	6
(West Germany) H Eisterlehner (United States) Julie Filkoff	1	2
(United States) S Rimes (United States) S Margolin	3	2
3	(Japan) N Sato (Australia) B Remilton	6	6
(United States) B Bruning (United States) Beverly Buckley	6	6
(Italy) P Murgo (Italy) Antonella Canapi	2	0
(United States) L Bonder (United States) S Solomon	6	6
2	(Australia) P Whytcross (United States) S McInerney	2	3

Quarterfinals
1	(United States) L duPont (United States) B Jordan	6	6
(Australia) B Randall (Australia) E Sayers	2	0
(United States) K Latham (United States) D Gilbert	6	6
(United States) K Steinmetz (United States) S Gordon	3	3
(Netherlands) M van der Torre (Netherlands) N Schutte	4	3
3	(Japan) N Sato (Australia) B Remilton	6	6
(United States) B Bruning (United States) B Buckley	6	1	3
(United States) L Bonder (United States) S Solomon	2	6	6

Semifinals
1	(United States) L duPont (United States) B Jordan	6	6
(United States) K Latham (United States) D Gilbert	1	0
3	(Japan) N Sato (Australia) B Remilton	6	1	6
(United States) L Bonder (United States) S Solomon	3	6	4

Final
1	(United States) L duPont (United States) B Jordan	6	6	6
3	(Japan) N Sato (Australia) B Remilton	2	7	1
