= 1982 Japan Open Tennis Championships =

Tennis tournament

- Date: 18–24 October
- Edition: 9th
- Surface: Hard / outdoor
- Location: Tokyo, Japan

Champions

Men's singles
- (United States) Jimmy Arias

Women's singles
- (Peru) Laura Arraya

Men's doubles
- (United States) Ferdi Taygan / (United States) Sherwood Stewart

Women's doubles
- (United States) Laura duPont / (United States) Barbara Jordan
- Japan Open

The 1982 Japan Open Tennis Championships was a combined men's and women's tennis tournament played on outdoor hard courts in Tokyo, Japan that was part of the 1982 Avon Championships World Championship Series and the 1982 Volvo Grand Prix. The tournament was held from 18 October through 24 October 1982. Jimmy Arias and Laura Arraya won the singles titles.

== Finals ==
=== Men's singles ===
(United States) Jimmy Arias defeated (France) Dominique Bedel 6–2, 2–6, 6–4

- It was Arias' 1st singles title of his career.

=== Women's singles ===
(Peru) Laura Arraya defeated (Peru) Pilar Vásquez 3–6, 6–4, 6–0

- It was Arraya's 1st singles title of her career.

=== Men's doubles ===
(United States) Ferdi Taygan / (United States) Sherwood Stewart defeated (United States) Tim Gullikson / (United States) Tom Gullikson 6–1, 3–6, 7–6

=== Women's doubles ===
(United States) Laura duPont / (United States) Barbara Jordan defeated (Japan) Naoko Sato / (Australia) Brenda Remilton 6–2, 6–7, 6–1

- It was duPont's 1st doubles title of the year and the 4th of her career. It was Jordan' 1st doubles title of her career.
