= Quito Open =

Defunct tennis tournament
- Event name: Quito Open; Quito Grand Prix
- Tour: Grand Prix circuit
- Founded: 1979
- Abolished: 1982
- Editions: 4
- Location: Quito, Ecuador
- Surface: Clay / outdoor

The Quito Open, also known as the Quite Grand Prix, was a Grand Prix affiliated men's professional tennis tournament played from 1979 to 1982. It was held in Quito in Ecuador and played on outdoor clay courts. The city is located at 2,800 m (9,200 ft) above mean sea level. The lower air pressure means breathing is more difficult for players and the ball flies faster.

Andrés Gómez was the most successful competitor at the event, winning the singles competition in 1982 and twice taking the doubles title in 1980 and 1981 partnering Chilean Hans Gildemeister.

== Results ==
=== Singles ===
| Year | Champions | Runners-up | Score |
|---|---|---|---|
| 1979 | (Paraguay) Víctor Pecci | (Spain) José Higueras | 2–6, 6–4, 6–2 |
| 1980 | (Argentina) José Luis Clerc | (Paraguay) Víctor Pecci | 6–4, 1–6, 10–8 |
| 1981 | (United States) Eddie Dibbs | (Australia) David Carter | 3–6, 6–0, 7–5 |
| 1982 | (Ecuador) Andrés Gómez | (France) Loïc Courteau | 6–3, 6–4 |

=== Doubles ===
| Year | Champions | Runners-up | Score |
|---|---|---|---|
| 1979 | (Chile) Álvaro Fillol (Chile) Jaime Fillol | (Colombia) Iván Molina (Colombia) Jairo Velasco Sr. | 6–7, 6–3, 6–1 |
| 1980 | (Chile) Hans Gildemeister (Ecuador) Andrés Gómez | (Argentina) José Luis Clerc (Chile) Belus Prajoux | 6–3, 1–6, 6–4 |
| 1981 | (Chile) Hans Gildemeister (Ecuador) Andrés Gómez | (Australia) David Carter (Ecuador) Ricardo Ycaza | 7–5, 6–3 |
| 1982 | (Chile) Jaime Fillol (Chile) Pedro Rebolledo | (United States) Egan Adams (United States) Rocky Royer | 6–2, 6–3 |

== See also ==
- Ecuador Open – ATP tournament (2015–2018).
