= Júlio Góes =

Brazilian tennis player (born 1955)

- Country (sports): Brazil
- Residence: São Paulo
- Born: 25 October 1955 (age 69); Bauru, Brazil
- Height: 1.80 m (5 ft 11 in)
- Plays: Right-handed
- Prize money: $151,995

Singles
- Career record: 13–41
- Career titles: 0
- Highest ranking: No. 68 (11 November 1985)

Grand Slam singles results
- French Open: 1R (1982, 1983, 1984, 1986)
- Wimbledon: 1R (1982, 1983)
- US Open: 1R (1982, 1983)

Doubles
- Career record: 11–30
- Career titles: 0
- Highest ranking: No. 128 (2 January 1984)

Grand Slam doubles results
- French Open: 1R (1982, 1983, 1984, 1986)
- Wimbledon: 1R (1983)
- US Open: 1R (1982)

Júlio Góes (born 25 October 1955, in Limeira) is a former professional tennis player from Brazil.

== Career ==
Goes appeared in 15 Grand Slam main draws, without registering a win. He entered the singles, men's doubles and mixed doubles at the 1983 French Open, the only occasion he played in all three draws. In the singles he took the first two sets off Hans Gildemeister but ultimately lost the match, retiring at 5-6 down in the fifth. He also came close to a second round appearance at the 1983 US Open when he again couldn't take advantage of winning the first two sets, against Hans Simonsson.

He was the runner-up Bahia in 1983 and made the quarter-finals of the 1987 Guarujá Open, both times in the singles. As a doubles player his best result was finishing runner-up with partner Ney Keller at Viña del Mar in 1983. He was also a doubles semi-finalist at Bahia in 1983 and Palermo in 1986.

The Brazilian represented his country at the Davis Cup in two ties. He won a singles rubber against Bolivia's Oscar Chiarella and played two further singles matches in 1985, both of which he lost, to Mexicans Leonardo Lavalle and Francisco Maciel.

== Grand Prix career finals ==
=== Singles: 1 (0–1) ===
Result	W/L	Date	Tournament	Surface	Opponent	Score
Loss	0–1	Nov 1983	Bahia, Brazil	Hard	(Chile) Pedro Rebolledo	3–6, 3–6

=== Doubles: 1 (0–1) ===
Result	W/L	Date	Tournament	Surface	Partner	Opponents	Score
Loss	0–1	Feb 1983	Viña del Mar, Chile	Clay	(Brazil) Ney Keller	(Chile) Hans Gildemeister (Chile) Belus Prajoux	3–6, 1–6

== Challenger titles ==
=== Singles: (5) ===
No.	Year	Tournament	Surface	Opponent	Score
1.	1981	Rio de Janeiro, Brazil	Clay	(Peru) Pablo Arraya	6–3, 6–3
2.	1982	São Paulo, Brazil	Carpet	(Brazil) Ney Keller	7–5, 6–1
3.	1983	Santos, Brazil	Clay	(Brazil) Carlos Kirmayr	6–2, 6–3
4.	1985	Curitiba (1), Brazil	Clay	(Argentina) Gustavo Guerrero	6–4, 6–0
5.	1985	Curitiba (2), Brazil	Clay	(Czechoslovakia) Milan Šrejber	6–4, 6–4

=== Doubles: (2) ===
No.	Year	Tournament	Surface	Partner	Opponents	Score
1.	1982	São Paulo, Brazil	Hard	(Brazil) Givaldo Barbosa	(Brazil) Thomaz Koch (Brazil) Cássio Motta	6–4, 6–1
2.	1985	Belo Horizonte, Brazil	Clay	(Italy) Massimo Cierro	(Brazil) Givaldo Barbosa (Brazil) Ivan Kley	6–3, 6–4
