= João Soares =

João Soares may refer to:

- João Lopes Soares (1878–1970), Portuguese politician
- João Soares (politician) (born 1949), Portuguese lawyer and politician
- João Soares (tennis) (born 1951), former tennis player from Brazil
- João Clemente Baena Soares (born 1931), Brazilian diplomat
