= Joel Hoffman (tennis) =

American tennis player

- Country (sports): United States
- Born: October 14, 1958 (age 67) Winona, Minnesota
- Plays: Right-handed

Singles
- Career record: 0–1
- Highest ranking: No. 329 (Jan 3, 1983)

Doubles
- Career record: 8–10
- Highest ranking: No. 127 (Jan 3, 1983)

Grand Slam doubles results
- US Open: 1R (1982)

Joel Hoffman (born October 14, 1958) is an American former professional tennis player.

Hoffman was a two-time state high school champion at Topeka High School in Kansas and was undefeated his junior year. He played collegiate tennis for the University of Houston, captaining the team as a senior. During the 1980s he featured on the professional tour, where he reached best ranking of 329 in singles and 127 in doubles. He appeared in the main draw of the men's doubles at the 1982 US Open.

== ATP Challenger finals ==
=== Doubles: 1 (0–1) ===
No.	Result	Date	Tournament	Surface	Partner	Opponents	Score
Loss	1.	Jul 1982	Rio de Janeiro, Brazil	Clay	(United States) Mark Dickson	(France) Dominique Bedel (Chile) Belus Prajoux	2–6, 7–6, 2–6
