= Ney Keller =

Brazilian tennis player

- Full name: Ney Keller
- Country (sports): Brazil
- Born: 2 December 1958 (age 67) Porto Alegre, Brazil
- Plays: Right-handed

Singles
- Career record: 1–6
- Career titles: 0
- Highest ranking: No. 161 (3 January 1983)

Doubles
- Career record: 12–20
- Career titles: 0
- Highest ranking: No. 110 (2 January 1984)

Grand Slam doubles results
- French Open: 1R (1979, 1982, 1983, 1984)
- Wimbledon: 1R (1983)

Grand Slam mixed doubles results
- French Open: 2R (1979, 1983)

Ney Keller (born 2 December 1958) is a former professional tennis player from Brazil.

== Biography ==
Keller, who comes from Porto Alegre, represented the Brazil Davis Cup team during their 1978 Davis Cup campaign. Primarily a doubles player, he played the doubles rubber in three ties, the first against Bolivia in Cochabamba, which he and partner Carlos Kirmayr won easily to give Brazil an unassailable lead in the tie. He teamed up with Kirmayr again to defeat Uruguay's doubles pair when the two sides met in Itu, a win that again secured the tie for Brazil. His final appearance came in the South America Zone semi-final in Buenos Aires. On this occasion he partnered Cássio Motta and they were unable to defeat Argentine player Elio Alvarez and José Luis Clerc in a must win rubber, losing in straight sets.

As a professional player in the 1980s he featured in the men's doubles draws of both the French Open and Wimbledon Championships. He made one final on the Grand Prix circuit, at Viña del Mar in 1983, partnered with Júlio Góes. They lost the final to the Chilean pairing of Hans Gildemeister and Belus Prajoux. He won two Challenger titles, both in doubles. Playing in singles he made several main draw appearances in South American Grand Prix tournaments. He was also runner-up at a São Paulo Challenger tournament in 1982 and won a match over Adriano Panatta at the Brescia Challenger in 1983.

== Grand Prix career finals ==
=== Doubles: 1 (0–1) ===
Result	Date	Tournament	Surface	Partner	Opponents	Score
Loss	Feb 1983	Viña del Mar, Chile	Clay	(Brazil) Júlio Góes	(Chile) Hans Gildemeister (Chile) Belus Prajoux	3–6, 1–6

== Challenger titles ==
=== Doubles: (2) ===
No.	Year	Tournament	Surface	Partner	Opponents	Score
1.	1979	Ribeirão Preto, Brazil	Clay	(Brazil) Cássio Motta	(Brazil) Thomaz Koch (Chile) Belus Prajoux	4–6, 7–6, 7–5
2.	1983	Parioli, Italy	Clay	(Brazil) Givaldo Barbosa	(Italy) Gianni Marchetti (Italy) Enzo Vattuone	6–3, 6–2

== See also ==
- List of Brazil Davis Cup team representatives
