= Givaldo Barbosa =

Brazilian tennis player

- Country (sports): Brazil
- Born: January 25, 1954 (age 72) Salvador, Brazil
- Height: 6 ft 0 in (183 cm)
- Plays: Right-handed
- Prize money: $197,253

Singles
- Career record: 13–45
- Highest ranking: No. 78 (30 July 1979)

Grand Slam singles results
- French Open: 1R (1983, 1984, 1985)
- Wimbledon: 1R (1983, 1985)
- US Open: 1R (1979, 1984, 1985)

Doubles
- Career record: 41–49
- Career titles: 3
- Highest ranking: No. 32 (20 May 1985)

Grand Slam doubles results
- French Open: 2R (1985, 1988)
- Wimbledon: 1R (1983, 1984, 1985, 1988)
- US Open: 3R (1984)

Givaldo Barbosa (born January 25, 1954) is a former professional tennis player from Brazil.

Most of his tennis success was in doubles. During his career, he won three doubles titles. He achieved a career-high doubles ranking of World No. 32 in 1985.

== Career finals ==
=== Doubles: 5 (3 titles / 2 runner-ups) ===
Result	W/L	Date	Tournament	Surface	Partner	Opponents	Score
Win	1–0	Nov 1982	Itaparica, Brazil	Carpet	(Brazil) João Soares	(Brazil) Thomaz Koch (Brazil) José Schmidt	7–6, 2–1, ret.
Win	2–0	Nov 1983	Bahia, Brazil	Hard	(Brazil) João Soares	(Argentina) Ricardo Cano (Brazil) Thomaz Koch	
Loss	2–1	Jul 1984	Gstaad, Switzerland	Clay	(Brazil) João Soares	(Switzerland) Heinz Günthardt (Switzerland) Markus Günthardt	4–6, 6–3, 6–7
Loss	2–2	May 1985	Forest Hills, U.S.	Clay	(Brazil) Ivan Kley	(United States) Ken Flach (United States) Robert Seguso	5–7, 2–6
Win	3–2	May 1985	Madrid, Spain	Clay	(Brazil) Ivan Kley	(Spain) Jorge Bardou (Spain) Alberto Tous	7–6, 6–4
