= Rocky Royer =

American tennis player

- Full name: Rocky Royer
- Country (sports): United States
- Born: June 27, 1958 (age 67) Berkeley, California, U.S.
- Plays: Right-handed
- Prize money: $42,018

Singles
- Career record: 3–13
- Highest ranking: No. 154 (3 January 1983)

Doubles
- Career record: 4–15
- Highest ranking: No. 141 (3 January 1983)

Rocky Royer (born June 27, 1958) is an American former professional tennis player.

== Biography ==
Born in Berkeley, California, Royer played collegiate tennis at Rice University for four years. In the early 1980s he competed on the professional tour, winning two Challenger titles. On the Grand Prix circuit his best performances came in 1982 when he was a quarter-finalist at Bahia and in the same year finished runner-up in the doubles at the Quito Open.

Royer now works as a tennis coach in Santa Fe, New Mexico.

== Grand Prix career finals ==
=== Doubles: 1 (0–1) ===
Result	W/L	Date	Tournament	Surface	Partner	Opponents	Score
Loss	0–1	Nov 1982	Quito, Ecuador	Clay	(United States) Egan Adams	(Chile) Jaime Fillol (Chile) Pedro Rebolledo	2–6, 3–6

== Challenger titles ==
=== Singles: (2) ===
No.	Year	Tournament	Surface	Opponent	Score
1.	1983	Campos do Jordão, Brazil (it)	Hard	(Brazil) Carlos Kirmayr	7–6, 3–6, 6–3
2.	1982	Lisbon, Portugal	Clay	(South Africa) Robbie Venter	6–3, 1–6, 6–3
