= Egan Adams =

American tennis player

- Full name: Egan Adams
- Country (sports): United States
- Born: June 15, 1959 (age 66); Miami Beach, Florida
- Plays: Right-handed
- Prize money: $65,640

Singles
- Career record: 9–25
- Career titles: 0
- Highest ranking: No. 109 (January 3, 1983)

Grand Slam singles results
- French Open: 1R (1985)
- US Open: 1R (1982)

Doubles
- Career record: 12–24
- Career titles: 0
- Highest ranking: No. 91 (April 29, 1985)

Grand Slam doubles results
- French Open: 1R (1985)
- US Open: 1R (1985)

Egan Adams (born June 15, 1959) is a former professional tennis player from the United States.

== Biography ==
Adams, a native of Miami, went to Archbishop Curley-Notre Dame High School, before competing professionally in the 1980s.

His best result on the Grand Prix circuit was reaching the doubles final of the 1982 Quito Open, with Rocky Royer. In 1982 he also made his first US Open main draw appearance, a first round loss to Mark Edmondson, as well as the quarter-finals in Brazil, his best singles performance in a Grand Prix tournament.

At the 1985 French Open he featured in both the singles and men's doubles event. He lost to Andrei Chesnokov in the opening round of the singles and in the doubles he and partner Stanislav Birner had to face second seeds Ken Flach and Robert Seguso. He also played at the 1985 US Open, in the men's doubles with Mark Wooldridge.

Adams won two Challenger titles in doubles, the second in Lagos in 1985. The title in Lagos came in the same month that he won a match against a young Thomas Muster in another Nigerian Challenger tournament.

He was a highly ranked player on the ITF senior's tour for many years.

== Grand Prix career finals ==
=== Doubles: 1 (0–1) ===
Result	W/L	Date	Tournament	Surface	Partner	Opponents	Score
Loss	0–1	Nov 1982	Quito, Ecuador	Clay	(United States) Rocky Royer	(Chile) Jaime Fillol (Chile) Pedro Rebolledo	2–6, 3–6

== Challenger titles ==
=== Doubles: (2) ===
No.	Year	Tournament	Surface	Partner	Opponents	Score
1.	1981	Reus, Spain	Clay	(South Africa) Robbie Venter	(United States) Junie Chatman (New Zealand) Bruce Derlin	6–7, 6–4, 6–4
2.	1985	Lagos, Nigeria	Clay	(United States) Mark Wooldridge	(West Germany) Peter Elter (Austria) Peter Feigl	6–4, 6–4
