= Belus Prajoux =

Chilean tennis player

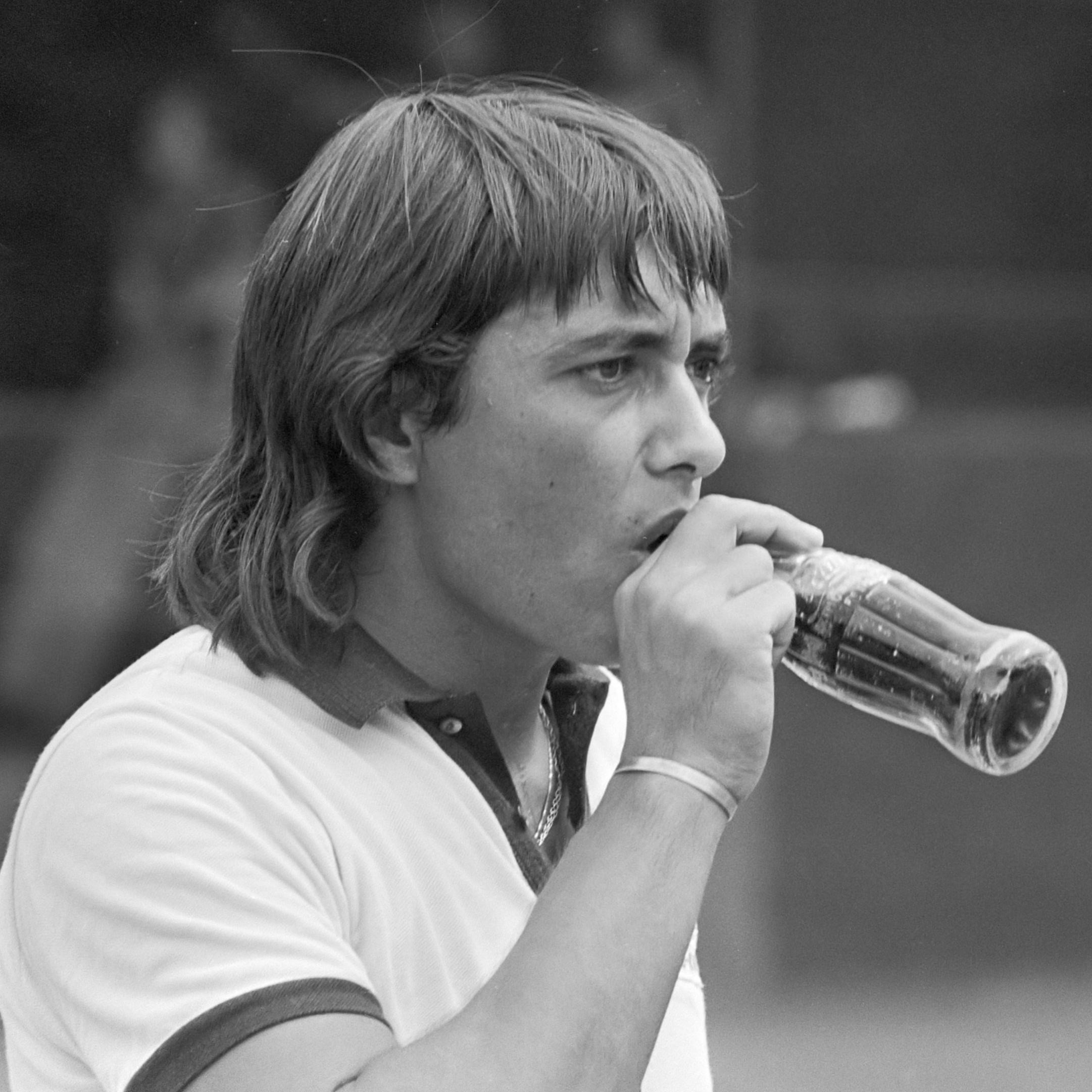
- Full name: Belus Prajoux Nadjar
- Country (sports): Chile
- Residence: Santiago, Chile
- Born: 27 February 1955 (age 71) Santiago, Chile
- Height: 1.70 m (5 ft 7 in)
- Turned pro: 1972
- Retired: 1986
- Plays: Right-handed (one-handed backhand)

Singles
- Career record: 81–128
- Career titles: 0
- Highest ranking: No. 66 (12 December 1976)

Grand Slam singles results
- French Open: 3R (1975, 1976, 1980)
- Wimbledon: 1R (1977, 1978, 1980)
- US Open: 1R (1973, 1974, 1975, 1976, 1977)

Doubles
- Career record: 168–131
- Career titles: 6
- Highest ranking: No. 17 (19 July 1982)

Grand Slam doubles results
- French Open: F (1982)
- Wimbledon: 3R (1980)
- US Open: QF (1975)

Team competitions
- Davis Cup: F (1976)

Belus Prajoux Nadjar (born 27 February 1955) is a retired professional tennis player from Chile.

Prajoux won six doubles titles on the ATP Tour during his career. He reached a highest doubles ranking of No. 17 in July 1982. He was a member of the Chile Davis Cup team, and played on the team that reached the final of the 1976 Davis Cup. Prajoux retired from the tour in 1986.

== Grand Slam finals ==
=== Doubles (1 loss) ===
Result	Year	Championship	Surface	Partner	Opponents	Score
Loss	1982	French Open	Clay	(Chile) Hans Gildemeister	(United States) Sherwood Stewart (United States) Ferdi Taygan	5–7, 3–6, 1–1 ret.

== ATP career finals ==
=== Doubles: 12 (6 wins / 12 losses) ===
Legend
Grand Slam (0)
Tennis Masters Cup (0)
ATP Masters Series (0)
ATP Tour (6)

Result	W-L	Date	Tournament	Surface	Partner	Opponents	Score
Win	1–0	Jul 1976	Hilversum, Netherlands	Clay	(Argentina) Ricardo Cano	(Poland) Wojciech Fibak (Hungary) Balázs Taróczy	6–4, 6–3
Loss	1–1	Nov 1976	São Paulo,, Brazil	Carpet	(Argentina) Ricardo Cano	(Argentina) Lito Álvarez (Paraguay) Víctor Pecci	4–6, 6–3, 3–6
Loss	1–2	Nov 1976	Buenos Aires, Argentina	Carpet	(Argentina) Ricardo Cano	(Brazil) Carlos Kirmayr (Argentina) Lito Álvarez	4–6, 5–7
Loss	1–3	Dec 1976	Santiago, Chile	Clay	(Argentina) Lito Álvarez	(Chile) Patricio Cornejo (Chile) Hans Gildemeister	3–6, 6–7
Win	2–3	Nov 1977	Bogotá, Colombia	Clay	(Chile) Hans Gildemeister	(Venezuela) Jorge Andrew (Brazil) Carlos Kirmayr	6–4, 6–2
Win	3–3	May 1978	Rome, Italy	Clay	(Paraguay) Víctor Pecci	(Czech Republic) Jan Kodeš (Czech Republic) Tomáš Šmíd	6–7, 7–6, 6–1
Loss	3–4	Jun 1978	Birmingham, UK	Grass	(Argentina) José Luis Clerc	(United States) Dick Stockton (United States) Erik Van Dillen	6–4, 1–6, 6–3, 6–8, 3–6
Loss	3–5	Jul 1978	Stuttgart, West Germany	Clay	(Brazil) Carlos Kirmayr	(Czech Republic) Jan Kodeš (Czech Republic) Tomáš Šmíd	3–6, 6–7
Loss	3–6	Nov 1978	Buenos Aires, Argentina	Clay	(Argentina) José Luis Clerc	(New Zealand) Chris Lewis (United States) Van Winitsky	4–6, 6–3, 0–6
Loss	3–7	Nov 1980	Quito, Ecuador	Clay	(Argentina) José Luis Clerc	(Ecuador) Andrés Gómez (Chile) Hans Gildemeister	3–6, 6–1, 4–6
Win	4–7	Nov 1980	Santiago, Chile	Clay	(Ecuador) Ricardo Ycaza	(Brazil) Carlos Kirmayr (Brazil) João Soares	4–6, 7–6, 6–4
Win	5–7	Sep 1981	Bordeaux, France	Clay	(Ecuador) Andrés Gómez	(United States) Jim Gurfein (Sweden) Anders Järryd	7–5, 6–3
Loss	5–8	Sep 1981	Palermo, Italy	Clay	(Chile) Jaime Fillol	(Uruguay) José Luis Damiani (Uruguay) Diego Pérez	1–6, 4–6
Loss	5–9	Nov 1981	Santiago, Chile	Clay	(Argentina) Ricardo Cano	(Chile) Hans Gildemeister (Ecuador) Andrés Gómez	2–6, 6–7
Loss	5–10	May 1982	French Open, France	Clay	(Chile) Hans Gildemeister	(United States) Sherwood Stewart (United States) Ferdi Taygan	5–7, 3–6. 1–1 ret.
Win	6–10	Feb 1983	Viña del Mar, Chile	Clay	(Chile) Hans Gildemeister	(Brazil) Júlio Góes (Brazil) Ney Keller	6–3, 6–1
Loss	6–11	Mar 1983	Nancy, France	Clay	(Chile) Ricardo Acuña	(Sweden) Jan Gunnarsson (Sweden) Anders Järryd	5–7, 3–6
Loss	6–12	Jul 1983	Boston, United States	Clay	(Chile) Hans Gildemeister	(United States) Mark Dickson (Brazil) Cássio Motta	5–7, 3–6
