= Jimmy Arias =

American tennis player and TV commentator

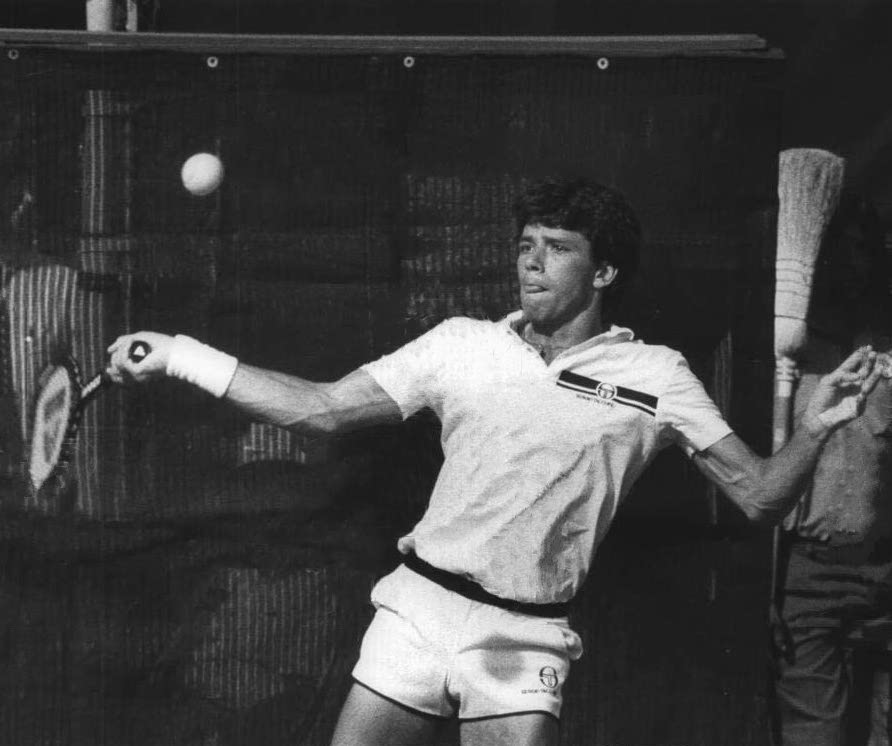
- Arias in 1984
- Country (sports): United States
- Residence: Buffalo, New York, U.S.
- Born: August 16, 1964 (age 62) Buffalo, New York, U.S.
- Height: 5 ft 9 in (175 cm)
- Turned pro: 1980
- Retired: 1994
- Plays: Right-handed (one-handed backhand)
- Coach: Nick Bollettieri
- Prize money: $1,834,140
- Official website: jimmyarias.com

Singles
- Career record: 283–222 (Grand Prix, WCT, ATP and Grand Slam, and in Davis Cup)
- Career titles: 5
- Highest ranking: No. 5 (9 April 1984)

Grand Slam singles results
- Australian Open: 3R (1991)
- French Open: QF (1984)
- Wimbledon: 4R (1984)
- US Open: SF (1983)

Other tournaments
- Tour Finals: 1R (1983)
- WCT Finals: SF (1984)
- Olympic Games: SF (1984, demonstration)

Doubles
- Career record: 71–108 (Grand Prix, WCT, ATP and Grand Slam, and in Davis Cup)
- Career titles: 0
- Highest ranking: No. 61 (11 May 1987)

Mixed doubles
- Career titles: 1

Grand Slam mixed doubles results
- French Open: W (1981)

James Arias (born August 16, 1964) is a retired tennis touring professional player from the United States.

== Biography ==
Arias was born in Grand Island, New York on August 16, 1964. His father, Antonio Arias, was born in Spain and emigrated to Cuba during after the Spanish Civil War, and played football for the Cuba national team. Arias' father was an engineer who analyzed his forehand, and revolutionized it by creating the full-whip forehand - it kept racket speed up by preventing Jimmy from slowing down as he hit the ball.

A baseliner, Arias turned pro at age 16 in 1980. His peak year was 1983, when as a 19-year-old he finished the year ranked World No. 6, having reached the U.S. Open semi-finals by defeating Jonathan Canter, Tom Gullikson, Gianni Ocleppo, Joakim Nyström and Yannick Noah, and then lost to Ivan Lendl. He also won the Italian Open and three other tour grand prix events.

He reached his career high ranking of World No. 5 in April 1984. He retired from the tour in 1994, having amassed a 286–223 singles playing record and over $1,800,000 in prize money.

With former World No. 2 tennis player, Andrea Jaeger, he won the 1981 French Open Mixed Doubles Championship.

=== Broadcast work ===
Arias serves as a commentator for ESPN International and Tennis Channel. Arias served as an analyst for NBC Sports coverage of Tennis at the 2008 Summer Olympics. In Canada, he has worked as an analyst for Rogers Sportsnet and the Canadian Broadcasting Corporation on the broadcasts of the Rogers Cup.

== Grand Slam finals ==
=== Mixed doubles (1 title) ===
Result	Year	Championship	Surface	Partner	Opponents	Score
Win	1981	French Open	Clay	(United States) Andrea Jaeger	(Netherlands) Betty Stöve (United States) Fred McNair	7–6, 6–4

== Career finals ==
=== Singles (5 titles, 11 runner-ups) ===
Titles by surface
Hard (0)
Grass (0)
Clay (5)
Carpet (0)

Result	W/L	Date	Tournament	Surface	Opponent	Score
Loss	0–1	Jul 1982	Washington, D.C., U.S.	Clay	(Czechoslovakia) Ivan Lendl	3–6, 3–6
Loss	0–2	Aug 1982	Indianapolis, U.S.	Clay	(Spain) José Higueras	5–7, 7–5, 3–6
Win	1–2	Oct 1982	Tokyo, Japan	Clay	(France) Dominique Bedel	6–2, 2–6, 6–4
Win	2–2	May 1983	Florence, Italy	Clay	(Italy) Francesco Cancellotti	6–4, 6–3
Win	3–2	May 1983	Rome, Italy	Clay	(Spain) José Higueras	6–2, 6–7^{(3–7)}, 6–1, 6–4
Win	4–2	Aug 1983	Indianapolis, U.S.	Clay	(Ecuador) Andrés Gómez	6–4, 2–6, 6–4
Loss	4–3	Jul 1983	Boston, Massachusetts, U.S.	Clay	(Argentina) José Luis Clerc	3–6, 1–6
Loss	4–4	Jul 1983	Washington D.C., U.S.	Clay	(Argentina) José Luis Clerc	3–6, 6–3, 0–6
Win	5–4	Sep 1983	Palermo, Italy	Clay	(Argentina) José Luis Clerc	6–2, 2–6, 6–0
Loss	5–5	May 1985	Las Vegas, U.S.	Hard	(United States) Johan Kriek	6–4, 3–6, 4–6, 2–6
Loss	5–6	May 1985	Florence, Italy	Clay	(Spain) Sergio Casal	6–3, 3–6, 2–6
Loss	5–7	Oct 1985	Tokyo Outdoor, Japan	Hard	(United States) Scott Davis	1–6, 6–7^{(3–7)}
Loss	5–8	Apr 1987	Monte Carlo Open, Monaco	Clay	(Sweden) Mats Wilander	6–4, 5–7, 1–6, 3–6
Loss	5–9	May 1988	Charleston, U.S.	Clay	(United States) Andre Agassi	2–6, 2–6
Loss	5–10	Jan 1990	Adelaide, Australia	Hard	(Austria) Thomas Muster	6–3, 2–6, 5–7
Loss	5–11	May 1991	Charlotte, U.S.	Clay	(Peru) Jaime Yzaga	3–6, 5–7

Awards
Preceded by Peter McNamara	ATP Most Improved Player; 1983	Succeeded by not awarded, 1984; Boris Becker, 1985
