= Toru Yonezawa =

Japanese tennis player (born 1958)

- Full name: Toru Yonezawa
- Country (sports): Japan
- Born: 31 October 1958 (age 66); Osaka, Japan
- Height: 6 ft 2 in (188 cm)

Singles
- Career record: 3–7

Doubles
- Career record: 5–8

Toru Yonezawa (米沢 徹, Yonezawa Tōru, born 31 October 1958) is a former professional tennis player from Japan.

== Biography ==
Born in Osaka, Yonezawa attended the University of Southwestern Louisiana, now known as UL Lafayette.

From 1981 to 1985 he competed in nine Davis Cup ties for Japan, including World Group relegation play-offs against France and Spain. All but one of his 10 Davis Cup matches came in doubles.

As a professional player he had his best performance at the Tokyo Outdoor in 1982, making the round of 16 of the Grand Prix tournament, with wins over Larry Stefanki and Morris Strode. He won a Sapporo Challenger event in 1986.

Yonezawa now works as a tennis coach and helped train Kei Nishikori when he was a junior.

== Challenger titles ==
=== Singles: (1) ===
No.	Year	Tournament	Surface	Opponent	Score
1.	1986	Sapporo, Japan	Hard	(Japan) Tsuyoshi Fukui	6–0, 7–5

== See also ==
- List of Japan Davis Cup team representatives
