= Dominique Bedel =

French tennis player

- Country (sports): France
- Born: 20 February 1957 (age 69) Casablanca, Morocco
- Height: 1.85 m (6 ft 1 in)
- Plays: Right-handed

Singles
- Career record: 57–88
- Career titles: 1
- Highest ranking: No. 41 (1 November 1982)

Grand Slam singles results
- French Open: 3R (1979, 1983)
- Career record: 31–57

Dominique Bedel (born 20 February 1957) is a former professional tennis player from France.

During his career, Bedel won one singles title. He achieved a career-high singles ranking of world No. 41 in November 1982 and a career-high doubles ranking of world No. 144 in 1983.

== Career finals ==
=== Singles (1 title) ===
Result	W/L	Date	Tournament	Surface	Opponent	Score
Win	1–0	Nov 1980	Bogotá, Colombia	Clay	(Brazil) Carlos Kirmayr	6–4, 7–6
Loss	1–1	Oct 1982	Tokyo Outdoor, Japan	Clay	(United States) Jimmy Arias	2–6, 6–2, 4–6

=== Doubles (1 runner-up) ===
Result	W/L	Date	Tournament	Surface	Partner	Opponents	Score
Loss	0–1	May 1983	Florence, Italy	Clay	(France) Bernard Fritz	(Paraguay) Francisco González (Paraguay) Víctor Pecci	6–4, 4–6, 6–7
