= 1990 Tokyo Indoor – Singles =

Singles
- 1990 Tokyo Indoor

Final
- Champion: (Czechoslovakia) Ivan Lendl
- Runner-up: (Germany) Boris Becker
- Score: 4–6, 6–3, 7–6^{(7–5)}

Details
- Draw: 48
- Seeds: 16

Events
Singles	Doubles
← 1989 ·	Tokyo Indoor	· 1991 →

Aaron Krickstein was the defending champion, but lost in the second round this year.

Ivan Lendl won the title, defeating Boris Becker in the final, 4–6, 6–3, 7–6^{(7–5)}.

== Seeds ==
1. (Sweden) Stefan Edberg (semifinals)
2. (Germany) Boris Becker (final)
3. (Czechoslovakia) Ivan Lendl (champion)
4. (Ecuador) Andrés Gómez (second round)
5. (United States) Aaron Krickstein (second round)
6. (France) Guy Forget (third round)
7. (United States) Michael Chang (second round)
8. (Australia) Richard Fromberg (second round)
9. (Switzerland) Jakob Hlasek (quarterfinals)
10. (Soviet Union) Andrei Cherkasov (quarterfinals)
11. (United States) Richey Reneberg (semifinals)
12. (United States) David Wheaton (third round)
13. (Australia) Wally Masur (third round)
14. (Germany) Carl-Uwe Steeb (second round)
15. (United States) Tim Mayotte (second round)
16. (Australia) Darren Cahill (third round)

== Draw ==
=== Key ===
- Q = Qualifier
- WC = Wild card
- LL = Lucky loser
- Alt = Alternate
- SE = Special exempt
- PR = Protected ranking
- ITF = ITF entry
- JE = Junior exempt
- w/o = Walkover
- r = Retired
- d = Defaulted
- SR = Special ranking

=== Finals ===
Semifinals
1	(Sweden) Stefan Edberg	5	3
3	(Czechoslovakia) Ivan Lendl	7	6
11	(United States) Richey Reneberg	6^{1}	2
2	(Germany) Boris Becker	7^{7}	6

Final
3	(Czechoslovakia) Ivan Lendl	4	6	7^{7}
2	(Germany) Boris Becker	6	3	6^{5}

=== Top half ===
==== Section 1 ====
First round
(Australia) T Woodbridge	6	7
WC	(Japan) E Furusho	3	6
Q	(Australia) S Youl	3	6
(Germany) P Kühnen	6	7
(United States) J Grabb	3	4
(Netherlands) P Haarhuis	6	6
(New Zealand) K Evernden	3	4
Q	(United States) B Garrow	6	6

Second round
1	(Sweden) S Edberg	6	6
(Australia) T Woodbridge	3	1
(Germany) P Kühnen	4	3
16	(Australia) D Cahill	6	6
9	(Switzerland) J Hlasek	4	6	6
(Netherlands) P Haarhuis	6	0	3
Q	(United States) B Garrow	3	6	7
8	(Australia) R Fromberg	6	3	6

Third round
1	(Sweden) S Edberg	6	6
16	(Australia) D Cahill	4	2
9	(Switzerland) J Hlasek	6	6
Q	(United States) B Garrow	4	4

Quarterfinals
1	(Sweden) S Edberg	6	3	7^{8}
9	(Switzerland) J Hlasek	4	6	6^{6}

==== Section 2 ====
First round
WC	(Japan) S Matsuoka	7	6	r
(Australia) M Woodforde	6	7
(United States) D Rostagno	7	6
(Canada) G Connell	6	4
(United States) P Chamberlin	5	2
Q	(Finland) A Rahunen	7	6
(United States) S Davis	7	7
(Australia) M Kratzmann	5	6

Second round
3	(Czechoslovakia) I Lendl	6	7
(Australia) M Woodforde	2	6
(United States) D Rostagno	4	4
13	(Australia) W Masur	6	6
12	(United States) D Wheaton	7	6
Q	(Finland) A Rahunen	5	4
(United States) S Davis	6	6
5	(United States) A Krickstein	3	1

Third round
3	(Czechoslovakia) I Lendl	6	3	6
13	(Australia) W Masur	4	6	3
12	(United States) D Wheaton	4	6
(United States) S Davis	6	7

Quarterfinals
3	(Czechoslovakia) I Lendl	7^{7}	6
(United States) S Davis	6^{0}	2

=== Bottom half ===
==== Section 3 ====
First round
(United States) B Pearce	6	6	6
(United States) D Goldie	7	4	3
(Australia) J Stoltenberg	4
(Sweden) P Lundgren	3^{r}
(United States) K Jones	4	4
(Germany) E Jelen	6	6
Q	(Sweden) T Högstedt	7	7
(United States) B Shelton	6	6

Second round
6	(France) G Forget	6	6	6
(United States) B Pearce	7	3	3
(Australia) J Stoltenberg	1	4
11	(United States) R Reneberg	6	6
14	(Germany) C-U Steeb	3	6	5
(Germany) E Jelen	6	3	7
Q	(Sweden) T Högstedt	6	6
4	(Ecuador) A Gómez	4	4

Third round
6	(France) G Forget	6	6
11	(United States) R Reneberg	7	7
(Germany) E Jelen	6	4	2
Q	(Sweden) T Högstedt	4	6	6

Quarterfinals
11	(United States) R Reneberg	6	6
Q	(Sweden) T Högstedt	3	2

==== Section 4 ====
First round
(Australia) P Cash	6	7
(Sweden) N Kroon	2	6
Q	(United States) R Leach	7	7
Q	(United States) D Pate	6	6
WC	(Japan) K Masuda	2	3
(United States) T Witsken	6	6
WC	(Japan) R Tsujino	2	7	6
(United States) J Rive	6	6	4

Second round
7	(United States) M Chang	6	6	4
(Australia) P Cash	3	7	6
Q	(United States) R Leach	1	4
10	(Soviet Union) A Cherkasov	6	6
15	(United States) T Mayotte	6	6	4
(United States) T Witsken	2	7	6
WC	(Japan) R Tsujino	4	6
2	(Germany) B Becker	6	7

Third round
(Australia) P Cash	6	3
10	(Soviet Union) A Cherkasov	7	6
(United States) T Witsken	2	3
2	(Germany) B Becker	6	6

Quarterfinals
10	(Soviet Union) A Cherkasov	4	4
2	(Germany) B Becker	6	6
