= 1990 Tokyo Indoor – Doubles =

Doubles
- 1990 Tokyo Indoor

Final
- Champions: (France) Guy Forget; (Switzerland) Jakob Hlasek
- Runners-up: (United States) Scott Davis; (United States) David Pate
- Score: 7–6, 7–5

Details
- Draw: 24
- Seeds: 8

Events
Singles	Doubles
← 1989 ·	Tokyo Indoor	· 1991 →

For the 1990 Tokyo Indoor doubles Kevin Curren and David Pate were the defending champions, but Curren did not participate this year. Pate partnered Scott Davis, losing in the final.

Guy Forget and Jakob Hlasek won the title, defeating Davis and Pate 7–6, 7–5 in the final.

== Seeds ==
All seeds receive a bye into the second round.

1. (United States) Rick Leach / (United States) Jim Pugh (second round)
2. (Canada) Grant Connell / (Canada) Glenn Michibata (semifinals)
3. (France) Guy Forget / (Switzerland) Jakob Hlasek (champions)
4. (United States) Scott Davis / (United States) David Pate (final)
5. (Australia) Darren Cahill / (Australia) Mark Kratzmann (quarterfinals)
6. (Mexico) Jorge Lozano / (United States) Todd Witsken (quarterfinals)
7. (Australia) Jason Stoltenberg / (Australia) Todd Woodbridge (second round)
8. (New Zealand) Kelly Evernden / (United States) Kelly Jones (semifinals)

== Draw ==
=== Key ===
- Q = Qualifier
- WC = Wild card
- LL = Lucky loser
- Alt = Alternate
- SE = Special exempt
- PR = Protected ranking
- ITF = ITF entry
- JE = Junior exempt
- w/o = Walkover
- r = Retired
- d = Defaulted
- SR = Special ranking

=== Finals ===
Semifinals

Final

8
- (New Zealand) Kelly Evernden
- (United States) Kelly Jones
6
2

3
- (France) Guy Forget
- (Switzerland) Jakob Hlasek
7
6

3
- (France) Guy Forget
- (Switzerland) Jakob Hlasek
7
7

4
- (United States) Scott Davis
- (United States) David Pate
6
5

4
- (United States) Scott Davis
- (United States) David Pate
7
6

2
- (Canada) Grant Connell
- (Canada) Glenn Michibata
5
3

=== Top half ===
First round

Second round

Quarterfinals

Semifinals

1
- (United States) R Leach
- (United States) J Pugh
6
7
6

- (Ecuador) A Gómez
- (Czechoslovakia) I Lendl
7
4
6

- (Ecuador) A Gómez
- (Czechoslovakia) I Lendl
7
6
7

- (United States) P Chamberlin
- (United States) R Van't Hof
6
6
3

- (Ecuador) A Gómez
- (Czechoslovakia) I Lendl
6
6

- (Australia) W Masur
- (United States) D Wheaton

8
- (New Zealand) K Evernden
- (United States) K Jones
7
7

WC
- (Japan) E Furusho
- (Japan) R Tsujino
DEF

WC
- (Japan) E Furusho
- (Japan) R Tsujino
3
2

8
- (New Zealand) K Evernden
- (United States) K Jones
6
6

8
- (New Zealand) K Evernden
- (United States) K Jones
6
2

3
- (France) G Forget
- (Switzerland) J Hlasek
7
6

3
- (France) G Forget
- (Switzerland) J Hlasek
6
6

- (Australia) P Doohan
- (Australia) L Warder
4
7
6

- (United States) J Canter
- (New Zealand) B Derlin
4
1

- (United States) J Canter
- (New Zealand) B Derlin
6
6
7

3
- (France) G Forget
- (Switzerland) J Hlasek
7
6
6

LL
- (Sweden) N Kroon
- (United States) D Rostagno
6
6

5
- (Australia) D Cahill
- (Australia) M Kratzmann
6
7
3

- (United States) K Kinnear
- (United States) B Pearce
4
3

LL
- (Sweden) N Kroon
- (United States) D Rostagno
4
5

5
- (Australia) D Cahill
- (Australia) M Kratzmann
6
7

=== Bottom half ===
First round

Second round

Quarterfinals

Semifinals

6
- (Mexico) J Lozano
- (United States) T Witsken
6
6
7

- (United States) J Rive
- (Australia) S Youl
5
7
6

- (United States) J Rive
- (Australia) S Youl
7
2
5

Q
(Netherlands) Tjerk Bogtstra
(Netherlands) P Haarhuis
7
5
2

6
- (Mexico) J Lozano
- (United States) T Witsken
5
1

- (Australia) N Borwick
- (Kenya) P Wekesa
4
2

4
- (United States) S Davis
- (United States) D Pate
7
6

- (United States) S Salumaa
- (United States) K Thorne
6
6

- (United States) S Salumaa
- (United States) K Thorne
2
6
2

4
- (United States) S Davis
- (United States) D Pate
6
4
6

4
- (United States) S Davis
- (United States) D Pate
7
6

2
- (Canada) G Connell
- (Canada) G Michibata
5
3

7
- (Australia) J Stoltenberg
- (Australia) T Woodbridge
4
4

- (Germany) B Becker
- (Germany) E Jelen
1
6
7

- (Germany) B Becker
- (Germany) E Jelen
6
6

- (United States) J Grabb
- (United States) R Reneberg
6
3
6

- (Germany) B Becker
- (Germany) E Jelen
6
6

WC
- (Japan) S Matsuoka
- (United States) B Shelton

2
- (Canada) G Connell
- (Canada) G Michibata
7
7

- (Australia) J Fitzgerald
- (Australia) M Woodforde
w/o

- (Australia) J Fitzgerald
- (Australia) M Woodforde
3
4

2
- (Canada) G Connell
- (Canada) G Michibata
6
6
