= 1992 Tokyo Indoor – Singles =

Singles
- 1992 Tokyo Indoor

Final
- Champion: (United States) Ivan Lendl
- Runner-up: (Sweden) Henrik Holm
- Score: 7–6^{(9–7)}, 6–4

Details
- Draw: 48
- Seeds: 16

Events
Singles	Doubles
← 1991 ·	Tokyo Indoor	· 1993 →

Stefan Edberg was the defending champion, but lost in the quarterfinals this year.

Ivan Lendl won the title, defeating Henrik Holm in the final, 7–6^{(9–7)}, 6–4.

== Seeds ==
1. (Sweden) Stefan Edberg (quarterfinals)
2. (United States) Michael Chang (semifinals)
3. (Germany) Boris Becker (third round)
4. (Croatia) Goran Ivanišević (quarterfinals)
5. (United States) Ivan Lendl (champion)
6. (South Africa) Wayne Ferreira (quarterfinals)
7. (Netherlands) Richard Krajicek (third round)
8. (Commonwealth of Independent States) Alexander Volkov (semifinals)
9. (Spain) Emilio Sánchez (second round)
10. (Spain) Javier Sánchez (second round)
11. (Australia) Wally Masur (third round)
12. (Netherlands) Paul Haarhuis (second round)
13. (United States) Derrick Rostagno (second round)
14. (Sweden) Henrik Holm (final)
15. (United States) David Wheaton (second round)
16. (Australia) Todd Woodbridge (second round)

== Draw ==
=== Key ===
- Q = Qualifier
- WC = Wild card
- LL = Lucky loser
- Alt = Alternate
- SE = Special exempt
- PR = Protected ranking
- ITF = ITF entry
- JE = Junior exempt
- w/o = Walkover
- r = Retired
- d = Defaulted
- SR = Special ranking

=== Finals ===
Semifinals
8	(Commonwealth of Independent States) Alexander Volkov	5	2
14	(Sweden) Henrik Holm	7	6
5	(United States) Ivan Lendl	6	6
2	(United States) Michael Chang	3	4

Final
14	(Sweden) Henrik Holm	6^{7}	4
5	(United States) Ivan Lendl	7^{9}	6

=== Top half ===
==== Section 1 ====
First round
Q	(Denmark) K Carlsen	7	6^{1}	2
(United States) J Grabb	5	7^{7}	6
(South Africa) C van Rensburg	3	2
(United States) P McEnroe	6	6
(Australia) S Youl	7	2	2
(Japan) S Matsuoka	5	6	6
(Germany) P Baur	6	2	2
(Australia) R Fromberg	4	6	6

Second round
1	(Sweden) S Edberg	6	6
(United States) J Grabb	4	4
(United States) P McEnroe	6	2	6
15	(United States) D Wheaton	1	6	4
9	(Spain) E Sánchez	6^{3}	6	3
(Japan) S Matsuoka	7^{7}	4	6
(Australia) R Fromberg	3	1
8	(Commonwealth of Independent States) A Volkov	6	6

Third round
1	(Sweden) S Edberg	6	7^{7}
(United States) P McEnroe	2	6^{3}
(Japan) S Matsuoka	5	2
8	(Commonwealth of Independent States) A Volkov	7	6

Quarterfinals
1	(Sweden) S Edberg	3	6	5
8	(Commonwealth of Independent States) A Volkov	6	3	7

==== Section 2 ====
First round
(Zimbabwe) B Black	4	6	4
(Croatia) G Prpić	6	4	6
(United States) B Shelton	7^{7}	6
(Germany) P Kühnen	6^{4}	2
Q	(Sweden) L-A Wahlgren	3	3
(Canada) C Pridham	6	6
WC	(Japan) Y Yamamoto	3	6	3
(Switzerland) C Mezzadri	6	3	6

Second round
3	(Germany) B Becker	6	7
(Croatia) G Prpić	4	5
(United States) B Shelton	4	6	4
14	(Sweden) H Holm	6	2	6
12	(Netherlands) P Haarhuis	4	4
(Canada) C Pridham	6	6
(Switzerland) C Mezzadri	4	6	3
6	(South Africa) W Ferreira	6	3	6

Third round
3	(Germany) B Becker	1	2
14	(Sweden) H Holm	6	6
(Canada) C Pridham	6^{4}	6	4
6	(South Africa) W Ferreira	7^{7}	4	6

Quarterfinals
14	(Sweden) H Holm	7^{7}	6
6	(South Africa) W Ferreira	6^{5}	2

=== Bottom half ===
==== Section 3 ====
First round
(United States) T Martin	7^{7}	6
(Australia) S Stolle	6^{2}	4
(France) G Raoux	6	6
WC	(South Korea) B-S Kim	2	3
Q	(Sweden) N Kroon	6	7
(Austria) A Antonitsch	3	5
(Netherlands) J Eltingh	6	3	2
(United States) R Reneberg	3	6	6

Second round
5	(United States) I Lendl	7	2	7
(United States) T Martin	5	6	5
(France) G Raoux	7	6^{1}	4
11	(Australia) W Masur	5	7^{7}	6
13	(United States) D Rostagno	6^{5}	3
Q	(Sweden) N Kroon	7^{7}	6
(United States) R Reneberg	3	4
4	(Croatia) G Ivanišević	6	6

Third round
5	(United States) I Lendl	6^{4}	6	7^{7}
11	(Australia) W Masur	7^{7}	4	6^{4}
Q	(Sweden) N Kroon	4	2
4	(Croatia) G Ivanišević	6	6

Quarterfinals
5	(United States) I Lendl	6	6
4	(Croatia) G Ivanišević	3	4

==== Section 4 ====
First round
(Italy) D Nargiso	3	6^{5}
(Australia) M Woodforde	6	7^{7}
Q	(United States) K Thorne	6	6
WC	(Japan) H Kaneko	3	2
Q	(Canada) G Connell	3	4
(United States) J Stark	6	6
WC	(Japan) R Tsujino	2	4
Q	(Commonwealth of Independent States) A Olhovskiy	6	6

Second round
7	(Netherlands) R Krajicek	6	6
(Australia) M Woodforde	4	2
Q	(United States) K Thorne	6	6
10	(Spain) J Sánchez	3	2
16	(Australia) T Woodbridge	3	7	6^{4}
(United States) J Stark	6	5	7^{7}
Q	(Commonwealth of Independent States) A Olhovskiy	2	3
2	(United States) M Chang	6	6

Third round
7	(Netherlands) R Krajicek	3	6^{0}
Q	(United States) K Thorne	6	7^{7}
(United States) J Stark	0	7^{7}	0
2	(United States) M Chang	6	6^{5}	6

Quarterfinals
Q	(United States) K Thorne	6^{2}	3
2	(United States) M Chang	7^{7}	6
