= 1991 Tokyo Indoor =

- Date: 8–14 October
- Edition: 14th
- Category: Championship Series
- Draw: 48S / 24D
- Surface: Carpet / indoor
- Location: Tokyo, Japan

Champions

Singles
- (Sweden) Stefan Edberg

Doubles
- (United States) Jim Grabb / (United States) Richey Reneberg
← 1990 ·	Tokyo Indoor	· 1992 →

The 1991 Tokyo Indoor, also known by its sponsored name Seiko Super Tennis, was a men's tennis tournament played on indoor carpet courts in Tokyo, Japan that was part of the IBM 1991 ATP Tour and was an ATP Championship Series event. It was the 14th edition of the tournament and was held from 8 October through 14 October 1991. Matches were the best of three sets. First-seeded Stefan Edberg won the singles title.

== Finals ==
=== Singles ===
(Sweden) Stefan Edberg defeated (United States) Derrick Rostagno 6–3, 1–6, 6–2

- It was Edberg's 6th singles title of the year and the 33rd of his career.

=== Doubles ===
(United States) Jim Grabb / (United States) Richey Reneberg defeated (United States) Scott Davis / (United States) David Pate 7–5, 2–6, 7–6
