= 1979 Seiko World Super Tennis – Doubles =

Doubles
- 1979 Tokyo Indoor

Final
- Champions: (United States) Marty Riessen (United States) Sherwood Stewart
- Runners-up: (United States) Mike Cahill (United States) Terry Moor
- Score: 6–4, 7–6

Details
- Draw: 16
- Seeds: 4

Events
Singles	Doubles
← 1978 ·	Tokyo Indoor	· 1980 →

Ross Case and Geoff Masters were the defending champions, but lost in the first round this year.

Marty Riessen and Sherwood Stewart won the title, defeating Mike Cahill and Terry Moor 6–4, 7–6 in the final.

== Seeds ==
1. (United States) Marty Riessen / (United States) Sherwood Stewart (champions)
2. (United States) Tim Gullikson / (United States) Robert Lutz (first round)
3. (Romania) Ilie Năstase / (Czechoslovakia) Tomáš Šmíd (semifinals)
4. (Australia) Ross Case / (Australia) Geoff Masters (first round)

== Draw ==
=== Key ===
- Q = Qualifier
- WC = Wild card
- LL = Lucky loser
- Alt = Alternate
- SE = Special exempt
- PR = Protected ranking
- ITF = ITF entry
- JE = Junior exempt
- w/o = Walkover
- r = Retired
- d = Defaulted
- SR = Special ranking

=== Draw ===
First round
1	(United States) M Riessen (United States) S Stewart	6	7
(United States) J Bailey (United States) G Hardie	3	6
(United States) V Amaya (United States) H Pfister	4	4
(Australia) P Kronk (Australia) P McNamara	6	6
3	(Romania) I Năstase (Czechoslovakia) T Šmíd	6	6
(Japan) K Hirai (Japan) J Kamiwazumi	4	2
(Australia) M Edmondson (Australia) J Marks	3	5
(United States) J Sadri (United States) T Wilkison	6	7
(Australia) R Frawley (Paraguay) F González	6	1	6
(India) V Amritraj (United States) P Du Pré	1	6	0
(United States) B Scanlon (United States) B Walts	7	7
4	(Australia) R Case (Australia) G Masters	6	5
(West Germany) J Fassbender (United Kingdom) B Mottram	6	3	6
(United States) S Denton (Australia) K Warwick	4	6	7
(United States) M Cahill (United States) T Moor	6	6
2	(United States) T Gullikson (United States) R Lutz	2	1

Quarterfinals
1	(United States) M Riessen (United States) S Stewart	6	4	6
(Australia) P Kronk (Australia) P McNamara	3	6	2
3	(Romania) I Năstase (Czechoslovakia) T Šmíd	4	6	7
(United States) J Sadri (United States) T Wilkison	6	3	5
(Australia) R Frawley (Paraguay) F González	6	6	6
(United States) B Scanlon (United States) B Walts	7	3	4
(United States) S Denton (Australia) K Warwick	7	6	6
(United States) M Cahill (United States) T Moor	6	7	7

Semifinals
1	(United States) M Riessen (United States) S Stewart	6	6
3	(Romania) I Năstase (Czechoslovakia) T Šmíd	4	1
(Australia) R Frawley (Paraguay) F González	1	4
(United States) M Cahill (United States) T Moor	6	6

Final
1	(United States) M Riessen (United States) S Stewart	6	7
(United States) M Cahill (United States) T Moor	4	6
