= 1985 Tokyo Indoor – Doubles =

Doubles
- 1985 Tokyo Indoor

Final
- Champions: (United States) Ken Flach (United States) Robert Seguso
- Runners-up: (United States) Scott Davis (United States) David Pate
- Score: 4–6, 6–3, 7–6^{(9–7)}

Events
Singles	Doubles
← 1984 ·	Tokyo Indoor	· 1986 →

Sammy Giammalva Jr. and Tony Giammalva were the defending champions, but lost in the final this year.

Ken Flach and Robert Seguso won the title, defeating Scott Davis and David Pate 4–6, 6–3, 7–6^{(9–7)} in the final.

== Seeds ==
1. (United States) Ken Flach / (United States) Robert Seguso (champions)
2. (Sweden) Anders Järryd / (Sweden) Mats Wilander (quarterfinals)
3. (Australia) John Fitzgerald / (Czechoslovakia) Tomáš Šmíd (semifinals)
4. (Ecuador) Andrés Gómez / (Czechoslovakia) Ivan Lendl (semifinals, withdrew)

== Draw ==
=== Key ===
- Q = Qualifier
- WC = Wild card
- LL = Lucky loser
- Alt = Alternate
- SE = Special exempt
- PR = Protected ranking
- ITF = ITF entry
- JE = Junior exempt
- w/o = Walkover
- r = Retired
- d = Defaulted
- SR = Special ranking

=== Draw ===
First round
1	(United States) K Flach (United States) R Seguso	7^{11}	3	7
(United States) V Gerulaitis (United States) V Van Patten	6^{9}	6	5
(United States) S Giammalva Jr. (United States) G Holmes	6^{9}	4
(United States) C Dunk (Canada) G Michibata	7^{11}	6
4	(Ecuador) A Gómez (Czechoslovakia) I Lendl	7^{7}	6
(Netherlands) M Oosting (United States) M Wooldridge	6^{1}	2
(United States) A Kohlberg (United States) R Van't Hof	6^{3}	3
(West Germany) B Becker (Socialist Federal Republic of Yugoslavia) S Živojinović	7^{7}	6
(United States) S McCain (United States) E Van't Hof	6	6^{4}	6^{5}
WC	(United States) J Bailey (Japan) T Yonezawa	1	7^{7}	7^{7}
(United States) J Canter (United States) CB Strode	2	3
3	(Australia) J Fitzgerald (Czechoslovakia) T Šmíd	6	6
(United States) S Davis (United States) D Pate	7^{12}	7^{7}
(United States) S Denton (United States) G Donnelly	6^{10}	6^{2}
(Switzerland) J Hlasek (United States) B Schultz	2	3
2	(Sweden) A Järryd (Sweden) M Wilander	6	6

Quarterfinals
1	(United States) K Flach (United States) R Seguso	6	7
(United States) C Dunk (Canada) G Michibata	3	5
4	(Ecuador) A Gómez (Czechoslovakia) I Lendl	7^{7}	6
(West Germany) B Becker (Socialist Federal Republic of Yugoslavia) S Živojinović	6^{2}	3
WC	(United States) J Bailey (Japan) T Yonezawa	1	0
3	(Australia) J Fitzgerald (Czechoslovakia) T Šmíd	6	6
(United States) S Davis (United States) D Pate	7^{7}	6^{2}	6
2	(Sweden) A Järryd (Sweden) M Wilander	6^{1}	7^{7}	4

Semifinals
1	(United States) K Flach (United States) R Seguso	w/o
4	(Ecuador) A Gómez (Czechoslovakia) I Lendl
3	(Australia) J Fitzgerald (Czechoslovakia) T Šmíd	6^{3}	6	1
(United States) S Davis (United States) D Pate	7^{7}	4	6

Final
1	(United States) K Flach (United States) R Seguso	4	6	7^{9}
(United States) S Davis (United States) D Pate	6	3	6^{7}
