= 1992 Tokyo Indoor – Doubles =

Doubles
- 1992 Tokyo Indoor

Final
- Champions: (Australia) Todd Woodbridge; (Australia) Mark Woodforde
- Runners-up: (United States) Jim Grabb; (United States) Richey Reneberg
- Score: 7–6, 6–4

Events
Singles	Doubles
← 1991 ·	Tokyo Indoor	· 1993 →

Jim Grabb and Richey Reneberg were the defending champions, but lost in the final this year.

Todd Woodbridge and Mark Woodforde won the title, defeating Grabb and Reneberg 7–6, 6–4 in the final.

== Seeds ==
All seeds receive a bye into the second round.

1. (United States) Jim Grabb / (United States) Richey Reneberg (final)
2. (United States) Kelly Jones / (United States) Rick Leach (second round)
3. (Australia) Todd Woodbridge / (Australia) Mark Woodforde (champions)
4. (United States) Patrick Galbraith / (South Africa) Danie Visser (quarterfinals)
5. (United States) Steve DeVries / (Australia) David Macpherson (second round)
6. (Australia) Mark Kratzmann / (Australia) Wally Masur (semifinals)
7. (United States) Luke Jensen / (Australia) Laurie Warder (quarterfinals)
8. (Canada) Grant Connell / (Canada) Glenn Michibata (quarterfinals)

== Draw ==
=== Key ===
- Q = Qualifier
- WC = Wild card
- LL = Lucky loser
- Alt = Alternate
- SE = Special exempt
- PR = Protected ranking
- ITF = ITF entry
- JE = Junior exempt
- w/o = Walkover
- r = Retired
- d = Defaulted
- SR = Special ranking

=== Finals ===
Semifinals

Final

1
- (United States) Jim Grabb
- (United States) Richey Reneberg
6
6
6

6
- (Australia) Mark Kratzmann
- (Australia) Wally Masur
7
3
4

1
- (United States) Jim Grabb
- (United States) Richey Reneberg
6
4

3
- (Australia) Todd Woodbridge
- (Australia) Mark Woodforde
7
6

3
- (Australia) Todd Woodbridge
- (Australia) Mark Woodforde
7
6

- (Germany) Patrik Kühnen
- (Italy) Diego Nargiso
6
3

=== Top half ===
First round

Second round

Quarterfinals

Semifinals

1
- (United States) J Grabb
- (United States) R Reneberg
7
6

- (Zimbabwe) B Black
- (United States) D Wheaton
6
6

- (Zimbabwe) B Black
- (United States) D Wheaton
6
2

- (South Africa) W Ferreira
- (South Africa) P Norval
4
4

1
- (United States) J Grabb
- (United States) R Reneberg
6
7

- (United States) B Shelton
- (United States) K Thorne
7
6
6

8
- (Canada) G Connell
- (Canada) G Michibata
2
5

WC
- (Japan) G Motomura
- (Japan) T Shimada
6
7
3

- (United States) B Shelton
- (United States) K Thorne
6
3

8
- (Canada) G Connell
- (Canada) G Michibata
7
6

1
- (United States) J Grabb
- (United States) R Reneberg
6
6
6

6
- (Australia) M Kratzmann
- (Australia) W Masur
7
3
4

4
- (United States) P Galbraith
- (South Africa) D Visser
6
6

- (Australia) N Borwick
- (Australia) S Youl
6
4
6

- (Australia) N Borwick
- (Australia) S Youl
4
2

WC
- (United States) C Chang
- (United States) M Chang
3
6
4

4
- (United States) P Galbraith
- (South Africa) D Visser
4
6

- (South Africa) P Aldrich
- (South Africa) G Muller
6
3

6
- (Australia) M Kratzmann
- (Australia) W Masur
6
7

WC
- (Croatia) G Ivanišević
- (Croatia) G Prpić
7
6

WC
- (Croatia) G Ivanišević
- (Croatia) G Prpić
3
7
1

6
- (Australia) M Kratzmann
- (Australia) W Masur
6
6
6

=== Bottom half ===
First round

Second round

Quarterfinals

Semifinals

5
- (United States) S DeVries
- (Australia) D Macpherson
6
6
2

- (Spain) E Sánchez
- (Spain) J Sánchez
6
3

Q
- (Sweden) N Kroon
- (Sweden) L-A Wahlgren
7
1
6

Q
- (Sweden) N Kroon
- (Sweden) L-A Wahlgren
7
6

Q
- (Sweden) N Kroon
- (Sweden) L-A Wahlgren
5
3

- (United States) B Garnett
- (United States) S Salumaa
1
4

3
- (Australia) T Woodbridge
- (Australia) M Woodforde
7
6

- (United States) P McEnroe
- (United States) J Stark
6
6

- (United States) P McEnroe
- (United States) J Stark
6
4

3
- (Australia) T Woodbridge
- (Australia) M Woodforde
7
6

3
- (Australia) T Woodbridge
- (Australia) M Woodforde
7
6

- (Germany) P Kühnen
- (Italy) D Nargiso
6
3

7
- (United States) L Jensen
- (Australia) L Warder
7
7

- (South Africa) D Adams
- (Commonwealth of Independent States) A Olhovskiy
4
4

- (Netherlands) J Eltingh
- (Netherlands) P Haarhuis
6
6

- (Netherlands) J Eltingh
- (Netherlands) P Haarhuis
6
6

7
- (United States) L Jensen
- (Australia) L Warder
7
6
4

- (United States) S Davis
- (United States) D Pate
1
2

- (Germany) P Kühnen
- (Italy) D Nargiso
6
7
6

- (Germany) P Kühnen
- (Italy) D Nargiso
6
6

- (Germany) P Kühnen
- (Italy) D Nargiso
7
6

2
- (United States) K Jones
- (United States) R Leach
6
4
