= 1990 Tokyo Indoor =

- Date: 8–14 October
- Edition: 13th
- Category: Championship Series
- Draw: 48S / 24D
- Surface: Carpet / indoor
- Location: Tokyo, Japan
- Venue: Yoyogi National Gymnasium

Champions

Singles
- (Czechoslovakia) Ivan Lendl

Doubles
- (France) Guy Forget / (Switzerland) Jakob Hlasek
← 1989 ·	Tokyo Indoor	· 1991 →

The 1990 Tokyo Indoor, also known by its sponsored name Seiko Super Tennis, was a men's tennis tournament played on indoor carpet courts at the Yoyogi National Gymnasium in Tokyo, Japan that was part of the 1990 ATP Tour and was an ATP Championship Series event, today known as the ATP World Tour 500 series. The tournament was held from 8 October through 14 October 1990. Matches were the best of three sets. Third-seeded Ivan Lendl won the singles title.

== Finals ==
=== Singles ===
(Czechoslovakia) Ivan Lendl defeated (Germany) Boris Becker 4–6, 6–3, 7–6^{(7–5)}

- It was Lendl's 5th singles title of the year and the 88th of his career.

=== Doubles ===
(France) Guy Forget / (Switzerland) Jakob Hlasek defeated (United States) Scott Davis / (United States) David Pate 7–6, 7–5
