= 1984 Tokyo Indoor – Singles =

Singles
- 1984 Tokyo Indoor

Final
- Champion: (United States) Jimmy Connors
- Runner-up: (Czechoslovakia) Ivan Lendl
- Score: 6–4, 3–6, 6–0

Details
- Draw: 32
- Seeds: 8

Events
Singles	Doubles
← 1983 ·	Tokyo Indoor	· 1985 →

Ivan Lendl was the defending champion.

Jimmy Connors won the tournament, beating Lendl in the final, 6–4, 3–6, 6–0.

== Seeds ==
1. (United States) Jimmy Connors (champion)
2. (Czechoslovakia) Ivan Lendl (final)
3. (Sweden) Mats Wilander (quarterfinals)
4. (Ecuador) Andrés Gómez (semifinals)
5. (Sweden) Anders Järryd (first round)
6. (Czechoslovakia) Tomáš Šmíd (first round)
7. (United States) Scott Davis (first round)
8. (United States) Brad Gilbert (first round)

== Draw ==
=== Key ===
- Q = Qualifier
- WC = Wild card
- LL = Lucky loser
- Alt = Alternate
- SE = Special exempt
- PR = Protected ranking
- ITF = ITF entry
- JE = Junior exempt
- w/o = Walkover
- r = Retired
- d = Defaulted
- SR = Special ranking

=== Finals ===
Semifinals
1	(United States) Jimmy Connors	6	6
4	(Ecuador) Andrés Gómez	3	2
(India) Ramesh Krishnan	2	4
2	(Czechoslovakia) Ivan Lendl	6	6

Final
1	(United States) Jimmy Connors	6	3	6
2	(Czechoslovakia) Ivan Lendl	4	6	0

=== Top half ===
First round
1	(United States) J Connors	6	6
(United States) T Moor	2	4
(United States) B Green	6	6
(Japan) S Shiraishi	2	4
(United States) Ti Gullikson	4	1
(United States) M Dickson	6	6
Q	(Canada) G Michibata	6	6
5	(Sweden) A Järryd	4	2
4	(Ecuador) A Gómez	7	6
(United States) G Holmes	6	2
(Japan) T Fukui	6	1
(United States) To Gullikson	7	6
(United States) E Korita	6	7
(Nigeria) N Odizor	4	5
(United States) B Scanlon	6	6
8	(United States) B Gilbert	4	1

Second round
1	(United States) J Connors	6	6
(United States) B Green	4	2
(United States) M Dickson	2	6	6
Q	(Canada) G Michibata	6	3	2
4	(Ecuador) A Gómez	6	6	7
(United States) To Gullikson	3	7	5
(United States) E Korita	6	7
(United States) B Scanlon	3	6

Quarterfinals
1	(United States) J Connors	6	7
(United States) M Dickson	4	5
4	(Ecuador) A Gómez	6	6
(United States) E Korita	3	2

Semifinals
1	(United States) J Connors	6	6
4	(Ecuador) A Gómez	3	2

=== Bottom half ===
First round
6	(Czechoslovakia) T Šmíd	6	4	2
(India) R Krishnan	2	6	6
Q	(United States) D Gitlin	6	1	1
(Hungary) Z Kuhárszky	4	6	6
Q	(Paraguay) F González	1	6	5
(United States) B Testerman	6	3	7
(United States) J Sadri	6	4
3	(Sweden) M Wilander	7	6
7	(United States) S Davis	7	3	6
(United States) M Davis	5	6	7
(India) A Amritraj	6	6
(United States) L Shiras	3	0
Q	(United States) M Anger	6	7
(Australia) J Fitzgerald	4	6
(United States) S Giammalva Jr.	4	1
2	(Czechoslovakia) I Lendl	6	6

Second round
(India) R Krishnan	6	6
(Hungary) Z Kuhárszky	0	4
(United States) B Testerman	3	2
3	(Sweden) M Wilander	6	6
(United States) M Davis	3	0
(India) A Amritraj	6	6
Q	(United States) M Anger	0	2
2	(Czechoslovakia) I Lendl	6	6

Quarterfinals
(India) R Krishnan	5	6	7
3	(Sweden) M Wilander	7	4	6
(India) A Amritraj	4	4
2	(Czechoslovakia) I Lendl	6	6

Semifinals
(India) R Krishnan	2	4
2	(Czechoslovakia) I Lendl	6	6
