= 1993 Tokyo Indoor =

- Date: 11–17 October
- Edition: 16th
- Category: Championship Series
- Draw: 48S / 24D
- Surface: Carpet / indoor
- Location: Tokyo, Japan

Champions

Singles
- (United States) Ivan Lendl

Doubles
- (Canada) Grant Connell / (United States) Patrick Galbraith
- Tokyo Indoor

The 1993 Tokyo Indoor also known as "Seiko Super Tennis" was a men's tennis tournament played on indoor carpet courts in Tokyo, Japan that was part of the IBM 1993 ATP Tour and was an ATP Championship Series event. The tournament was held from 11 October through 17 October 1993. Matches were the best of three sets. Ninth-seeded Ivan Lendl won his second consecutive singles title at the event and his fifth in total.

== Finals ==
=== Singles ===
(United States) Ivan Lendl defeated (United States) Todd Martin 6–4, 6–4

- It was Lendl's 2nd singles title of the year and the 94th and last of his career.

=== Doubles ===
(Canada) Grant Connell / (United States) Patrick Galbraith defeated (United States) Luke Jensen / (United States) Murphy Jensen 6–4, 6–4
