= 1991 Tokyo Indoor – Singles =

Singles
- 1991 Tokyo Indoor

Final
- Champion: (Sweden) Stefan Edberg
- Runner-up: (United States) Derrick Rostagno
- Score: 6–3, 1–6, 6–2

Details
- Draw: 48
- Seeds: 16

Events
Singles	Doubles
← 1990 ·	Tokyo Indoor	· 1992 →

Ivan Lendl was the defending champion, but lost in the semifinals this year.

Stefan Edberg won the title, defeating Derrick Rostagno in the final, 6–3, 1–6, 6–2.

== Seeds ==
1. (Sweden) Stefan Edberg (champion)
2. (Germany) Boris Becker (quarterfinals)
3. (Czechoslovakia) Ivan Lendl (semifinals)
4. (United States) Andre Agassi (quarterfinals)
5. (United States) David Wheaton (quarterfinals)
6. (Socialist Federal Republic of Yugoslavia) Goran Ivanišević (semifinals)
7. (United States) Derrick Rostagno (final)
8. (United States) Michael Chang (quarterfinals)
9. (Soviet Union) Andrei Chesnokov (third round)
10. (United States) Richey Reneberg (third round)
11. (Australia) Todd Woodbridge (second round)
12. (United States) MaliVai Washington (third round)
13. (Australia) Wally Masur (third round)
14. (South Africa) Wayne Ferreira (second round)
15. (France) Frédéric Fontang (third round)
16. (Japan) Shuzo Matsuoka (third round)

== Draw ==
=== Key ===
- Q = Qualifier
- WC = Wild card
- LL = Lucky loser
- Alt = Alternate
- SE = Special exempt
- PR = Protected ranking
- ITF = ITF entry
- JE = Junior exempt
- w/o = Walkover
- r = Retired
- d = Defaulted
- SR = Special ranking

=== Finals ===
Semifinals
1	(Sweden) Stefan Edberg	4	7^{7}	7
6	(Socialist Federal Republic of Yugoslavia) Goran Ivanišević	6	6^{2}	5
3	(Czechoslovakia) Ivan Lendl	6^{4}	2
7	(United States) Derrick Rostagno	7^{7}	6

Final
1	(Sweden) Stefan Edberg	6	1	6
7	(United States) Derrick Rostagno	3	6	2

=== Top half ===
==== Section 1 ====
First round
(United States) D Pate	6	6
Q	(United States) J Sobel	3	4
(South Africa) G Muller	7	7^{7}
(Czechoslovakia) S Doseděl	5	6^{5}
(Italy) P Canè	6	6
WC	(Japan) H Tanizawa	3	4
(Australia) M Woodforde	6	6
(Sweden) P Lundgren	1	3

Second round
1	(Sweden) S Edberg	6	6
(United States) D Pate	2	4
(South Africa) G Muller	6^{3}	4
15	(France) F Fontang	7^{7}	6
9	(Soviet Union) A Chesnokov	7	6
(Italy) P Canè	5	3
(Australia) M Woodforde	1	4
8	(United States) M Chang	6	6

Third round
1	(Sweden) S Edberg	6	7
15	(France) F Fontang	2	5
9	(Soviet Union) A Chesnokov	3	4
8	(United States) M Chang	6	6

Quarterfinals
1	(Sweden) S Edberg	6	6
8	(United States) M Chang	2	2

==== Section 2 ====
First round
(Mexico) L Herrera	3	6	6
(Brazil) D Marcelino	6	1	4
Q	(Sweden) N Kroon	2	6	5
(United States) J Tarango	6	1	7
(Australia) S Youl	7^{7}	6
(Sweden) T Högstedt	6^{5}	1
(Australia) J Morgan	3	5
(Soviet Union) D Poliakov	6	7

Second round
4	(United States) A Agassi	7	6
(Mexico) L Herrera	5	1
(United States) J Tarango	7^{7}	6
14	(South Africa) W Ferreira	6^{5}	4
12	(United States) M Washington	6	7^{7}
(Australia) S Youl	4	6^{4}
(Soviet Union) D Poliakov	4	2
6	(Socialist Federal Republic of Yugoslavia) G Ivanišević	6	6

Third round
4	(United States) A Agassi	6	7^{10}
(United States) J Tarango	4	6^{8}
12	(United States) M Washington	6^{8}	7^{7}	4
6	(Socialist Federal Republic of Yugoslavia) G Ivanišević	7^{10}	6^{3}	6

Quarterfinals
4	(United States) A Agassi	3	4
6	(Socialist Federal Republic of Yugoslavia) G Ivanišević	6	6

=== Bottom half ===
==== Section 3 ====
First round
Q	(South Korea) B-S Kim	2	4
(United States) J Grabb	6	6
(Soviet Union) A Olhovskiy	3	5
(Italy) G Pozzi	6	7
Q	(United States) R Leach	2	4
Q	(Canada) G Michibata	6	6
(United States) S Davis	7^{7}	7^{7}
(Australia) N Borwick	6^{3}	6^{4}

Second round
5	(United States) D Wheaton	7^{7}	3	6
(United States) J Grabb	6^{2}	6	2
(Italy) G Pozzi	7^{7}	6
11	(Australia) T Woodbridge	6^{0}	3
13	(Australia) W Masur	6	6
Q	(Canada) G Michibata	0	3
(United States) S Davis	2	3
3	(Czechoslovakia) I Lendl	6	6

Third round
5	(United States) D Wheaton	6	6
(Italy) G Pozzi	0	2
13	(Australia) W Masur	4	7^{7}	2
3	(Czechoslovakia) I Lendl	6	6^{5}	6

Quarterfinals
5	(United States) D Wheaton	6^{5}	5
3	(Czechoslovakia) I Lendl	7^{7}	7

==== Section 4 ====
First round
(Canada) G Connell	5	3
(Australia) J Stoltenberg	7	6
WC	(Japan) R Tsujino	4	5
(Australia) J Anderson	6	7
(United States) R Weiss	6	6
WC	(Japan) Y Yamamoto	2	3
Q	(Argentina) D Orsanic	3	4
(Sweden) J Gunnarsson	6	6

Second round
7	(United States) D Rostagno	3	6	6
(Australia) J Stoltenberg	6	3	2
(Australia) J Anderson	4	6^{5}
10	(United States) R Reneberg	6	7^{7}
16	(Japan) S Matsuoka	2	6	7^{7}
(United States) R Weiss	6	2	6^{5}
(Sweden) J Gunnarsson	2	4
2	(Germany) B Becker	6	6

Third round
7	(United States) D Rostagno	3	6	6
10	(United States) R Reneberg	6	3	4
16	(Japan) S Matsuoka	6	3	4
2	(Germany) B Becker	2	6	6

Quarterfinals
7	(United States) D Rostagno	7^{7}	4	6
2	(Germany) B Becker	6^{4}	6	3
