= 1980 Seiko World Super Tennis – Doubles =

Doubles
- 1980 Tokyo Indoor

Final
- Champions: (United States) Victor Amaya (United States) Hank Pfister
- Runners-up: (United States) Marty Riessen (United States) Sherwood Stewart
- Score: 6–3, 3–6, 7–6^{(7–2)}

Events
Singles	Doubles
← 1979 ·	Tokyo Indoor	· 1981 →

Marty Riessen and Sherwood Stewart were the defending champions, but lost in the final this year.

Victor Amaya and Hank Pfister won the title, defeating Riessen and Stewart 6–3, 3–6, 7–6^{(7–2)} in the final.

== Seeds ==
1. (Australia) Peter McNamara / (Australia) Paul McNamee (semifinals)
2. (United States) Marty Riessen / (United States) Sherwood Stewart (final)
3. (United States) Bruce Manson / (United States) Brian Teacher (semifinals)
4. (United States) Victor Amaya / (United States) Hank Pfister (champions)

== Draw ==
=== Key ===
- Q = Qualifier
- WC = Wild card
- LL = Lucky loser
- Alt = Alternate
- SE = Special exempt
- PR = Protected ranking
- ITF = ITF entry
- JE = Junior exempt
- w/o = Walkover
- r = Retired
- d = Defaulted
- SR = Special ranking

=== Draw ===
First round
1	(Australia) P McNamara (Australia) P McNamee	4	6	6
(United States) T Moor (United States) E Teltscher	6	3	4
(Czechoslovakia) I Lendl (United States) B Scanlon	6^{5}	6	7^{7}
(United States) M Cahill (United States) S Mayer	7^{7}	1	6^{2}
4	(United States) V Amaya (United States) H Pfister	7^{7}	6^{4}	7
(United States) J Austin (United States) R Tanner	6^{4}	7^{7}	5
(Australia) R Case (Chile) J Fillol	6^{3}	1
(United States) F Buehning (United States) F Taygan	7^{7}	6
(United States) P Fleming (United States) P Rennert	5	6	7^{8}
(United States) P Du Pré (United States) Ti Gullikson	7	2	6^{6}
(Japan) T Fukui (Japan) J Kamiwazumi	5	1
3	(United States) B Manson (United States) B Teacher	7	6
(Australia) M Edmondson (Australia) C Letcher	6	7^{7}
(Australia) R Frawley (Paraguay) F González	4	6^{4}
(United States) To Gullikson (United States) B Walts	6	6^{2}	3
2	(United States) M Riessen (United States) S Stewart	3	7^{7}	6

Quarterfinals
1	(Australia) P McNamara (Australia) P McNamee	3	7^{9}	6
(Czechoslovakia) I Lendl (United States) B Scanlon	6	6^{7}	3
4	(United States) V Amaya (United States) H Pfister	6	6
(United States) F Buehning (United States) F Taygan	2	3
(United States) P Fleming (United States) P Rennert	6^{5}	3
3	(United States) B Manson (United States) B Teacher	7^{7}	6
(Australia) M Edmondson (Australia) C Letcher	3	2
2	(United States) M Riessen (United States) S Stewart	6	6

Semifinals
1	(Australia) P McNamara (Australia) P McNamee	2	4
4	(United States) V Amaya (United States) H Pfister	6	6
3	(United States) B Manson (United States) B Teacher	4	2
2	(United States) M Riessen (United States) S Stewart	6	6

Final
4	(United States) V Amaya (United States) H Pfister	6	3	7^{7}
2	(United States) M Riessen (United States) S Stewart	3	6	6^{2}
