= 1978 Seiko World Super Tennis =

- Date: 31 October – 5 November
- Edition: 1st
- Category: Grand Prix circuit (Super Series)
- Draw: 32S / 16D
- Prize money: $200,000
- Surface: Carpet / indoor
- Location: Tokyo, Japan
- Venue: Tokyo Municipal Gym

Champions

Singles
- (Sweden) Björn Borg

Doubles
- (Australia) Ross Case / (Australia) Geoff Masters
Tokyo Indoor	· 1979 →

The 1978 Seiko World Super Tennis, also known as the Tokyo Indoor, was a men's tennis tournament played on indoor carpet courts at the Tokyo Municipal Gym in Tokyo, Japan that was part of the 1978 Colgate-Palmolive Grand Prix. It was the inaugural edition of the tournament and was held from 31 October to 5 November 1978. Matches were the best of three sets. Second-seeded Björn Borg won the singles title and earned $30,000 first-prize money.

== Finals ==
=== Singles ===
(Sweden) Björn Borg defeated (United States) Brian Teacher 6–3, 6–4

- It was Borg's 9th singles title of the year and the 39th of his career.

=== Doubles ===
(Australia) Ross Case / (Australia) Geoff Masters defeated (United States) Pat DuPré / (United States) Tom Gorman 6–3, 6–4
