= 1980 Seiko World Super Tennis – Singles =

Singles
- 1980 Tokyo Indoor

Final
- Champion: (United States) Jimmy Connors
- Runner-up: (United States) Tom Gullikson
- Score: 6–1, 6–2

Details
- Draw: 32
- Seeds: 8

Events
Singles	Doubles
← 1979 ·	Tokyo Indoor	· 1981 →

Björn Borg was the defending champion, but lost in the quarterfinals this year.

Jimmy Connors won the tournament, beating Tom Gullikson in the final, 6–1, 6–2.

== Seeds ==
1. (Sweden) Björn Borg (quarterfinals)
2. (United States) Jimmy Connors (champion)
3. (Czechoslovakia) Ivan Lendl (quarterfinals)
4. (United States) Vitas Gerulaitis (first round)
5. (United States) Eliot Teltscher (second round)
6. (United States) John Sadri (semifinals)
7. (United States) Roscoe Tanner (second round)
8. (United States) Victor Amaya (quarterfinals)

== Draw ==
=== Key ===
- Q = Qualifier
- WC = Wild card
- LL = Lucky loser
- Alt = Alternate
- SE = Special exempt
- PR = Protected ranking
- ITF = ITF entry
- JE = Junior exempt
- w/o = Walkover
- r = Retired
- d = Defaulted
- SR = Special ranking

=== Finals ===
Semifinals
(United States) Bill Scanlon	6	3
Q	(United States) Tom Gullikson	7	6
6	(United States) John Sadri	4	7	6
2	(United States) Jimmy Connors	6	6	7

Final
Q	(United States) Tom Gullikson	1	2
2	(United States) Jimmy Connors	6	6

=== Top half ===
First round
1	(Sweden) B Borg	6	6
(Japan) T Fukui	2	2
(United States) B Teacher	7	6	6
(Australia) R Frawley	6	7	4
(United States) B Scanlon	7	3	7
(United States) P Rennert	6	6	5
5	(United States) E Teltscher	2	6	6
(United States) M Purcell	6	4	4
(Australia) P McNamee	6	6
4	(United States) V Gerulaitis	4	1
Q	(United States) To Gullikson	6	6
(Canada) G Michibata	1	4
(United States) B Walts	6	6
(Australia) P McNamara	1	2
8	(United States) V Amaya	6	6	6
Q	(Netherlands) L Sanders	4	7	3

Second round
1	(Sweden) B Borg	3	7	6
(United States) B Teacher	6	6	4
(United States) B Scanlon	6	3	6
5	(United States) E Teltscher	3	6	3
(Australia) P McNamee	3	6	6
Q	(United States) To Gullikson	6	2	7
(United States) B Walts	6	4
8	(United States) V Amaya	7	6

Quarterfinals
1	(Sweden) B Borg	5	6	5
(United States) B Scanlon	7	3	7
Q	(United States) To Gullikson	7	4	6
8	(United States) V Amaya	6	6	3

Semifinals
(United States) B Scanlon	6	3
Q	(United States) To Gullikson	7	6

=== Bottom half ===
First round
6	(United States) J Sadri	6	6	7
(United States) H Pfister	3	7	5
(United States) P Fleming	6	6
(Japan) J Kamiwazumi	4	2
(United Kingdom) B Mottram	7	2	6
(United States) T Moor	5	6	3
3	(Czechoslovakia) I Lendl	6	7
(Paraguay) F González	3	6
7	(United States) R Tanner	6	7
(United States) B Manson	3	6
(United States) P Du Pré	7	2	7
(United States) M Riessen	6	6	6
(United States) V Van Patten	6	6
(United States) Ti Gullikson	2	2
2	(United States) J Connors	6	6
(United States) S Mayer	4	1

Second round
6	(United States) J Sadri	6	6
(United States) P Fleming	3	4
(United Kingdom) B Mottram	6	3	1
3	(Czechoslovakia) I Lendl	1	6	6
7	(United States) R Tanner	3	3
(United States) P Du Pré	6	6
(United States) V Van Patten	2	1
2	(United States) J Connors	6	6

Quarterfinals
6	(United States) J Sadri	7	6	7
3	(Czechoslovakia) I Lendl	6	7	6
(United States) P Du Pré	3	0
2	(United States) J Connors	6	6

Semifinals
6	(United States) J Sadri	4	7	6
2	(United States) J Connors	6	6	7
