= 1979 Seiko World Super Tennis – Singles =

Singles
- 1979 Seiko World Super Tennis

Final
- Champion: (Sweden) Björn Borg
- Runner-up: (United States) Jimmy Connors
- Score: 6–2, 6–2

Details
- Draw: 32
- Seeds: 8

Events
| Singles | Doubles |
| ← 1978 · | Tokyo Indoor | · 1980 → |

Björn Borg was the defending champion and successfully defended his title, defeating Jimmy Connors in the final, 6–2, 6–2.

== Seeds ==
1. (Sweden) Björn Borg (champion)
2. (United States) Jimmy Connors (final)
3. (United States) Roscoe Tanner (first round)
4. (United States) Vitas Gerulaitis (semifinals)
5. (Argentina) Guillermo Vilas (first round)
6. (United States) Tim Gullikson (quarterfinals)
7. (United States) Pat Du Pré (first round)
8. (France) Yannick Noah (quarterfinals)

== Draw ==
=== Key ===
- Q = Qualifier
- WC = Wild card
- LL = Lucky loser
- Alt = Alternate
- SE = Special exempt
- PR = Protected ranking
- ITF = ITF entry
- JE = Junior exempt
- w/o = Walkover
- r = Retired
- d = Defaulted
- SR = Special ranking

=== Finals ===
Semifinals
1 | (Sweden) Björn Borg | 6 | 6
(United States) John Sadri | 3 | 1
4 | (United States) Vitas Gerulaitis | 6 | 6 | 3
2 | (United States) Jimmy Connors | 7 | 2 | 6

Final
1 | (Sweden) Björn Borg | 6 | 6
2 | (United States) Jimmy Connors | 2 | 2

=== Top half ===
First round
1 | (Sweden) B Borg | 6 | 7 | 7
(United States) V Amaya | 7 | 6 | 6
(United States) B Scanlon | 6 | 6
(Japan) S Nishio | 2 | 2
(United States) R Lutz | 6 | 6 | 6
(United States) T Moor | 4 | 7 | 4
(Australia) K Warwick | 7 | 6
7 | (United States) P Du Pré | 6 | 2
3 | (United States) R Tanner | 3 | 6
(United States) J Sadri | 6 | 7
(Czechoslovakia) I Lendl | 3 | 7 | 6
Q | (Australia) M Edmondson | 6 | 6 | 2
(India) V Amritraj | 6 | 6
(United States) B Walts | 3 | 2
(United Kingdom) B Mottram | 6 | 6
5 | (Argentina) G Vilas | 4 | 4

Second round
1 | (Sweden) B Borg | 2 | 7 | 6
(United States) B Scanlon | 6 | 6 | 1
(United States) R Lutz | 7 | 6
(Australia) K Warwick | 5 | 0
(United States) J Sadri | 6 | 4 | 6
(Czechoslovakia) I Lendl | 0 | 6 | 3
(India) V Amritraj | 6 | 6
(United Kingdom) B Mottram | 3 | 3

Quarterfinals
1 | (Sweden) B Borg | 6 | 6
(United States) R Lutz | 3 | 3
(United States) J Sadri | 2 | 6 | 6
(India) V Amritraj | 6 | 4 | 3

Semifinals
1 | (Sweden) B Borg | 6 | 6
(United States) J Sadri | 3 | 1

=== Bottom half ===
First round
8 | (France) Y Noah | 6 | 7
(Japan) T Fukui | 2 | 5
(Japan) J Kuki | 2 | 4
(Australia) G Masters | 6 | 6
(Australia) R Case | 6 | 3 | 6
(United States) T Wilkison | 4 | 6 | 7
(United States) H Pfister | 7 | 3 | 2
4 | (United States) V Gerulaitis | 6 | 6 | 6
6 | (United States) T Gullikson | 7 | 4 | 6
(Romania) I Năstase | 6 | 6 | 3
(United States) M Riessen | 6 | 6
(Czechoslovakia) T Šmíd | 2 | 3
(Australia) P McNamara | 6 | 3
(Austria) P Feigl | 7 | 6
Q | (Australia) R Frawley | 1 | 6 | 3
2 | (United States) J Connors | 6 | 4 | 6

Second round
8 | (France) Y Noah | 6 | 4 | 7
(Australia) G Masters | 4 | 6 | 6
(United States) T Wilkison | 3 | 1
4 | (United States) V Gerulaitis | 6 | 6
6 | (United States) T Gullikson | 6 | 4 | 6
(United States) M Riessen | 1 | 6 | 2
(Austria) P Feigl | 3 | 0
2 | (United States) J Connors | 6 | 6

Quarterfinals
8 | (France) Y Noah | 3 | 2
4 | (United States) V Gerulaitis | 6 | 6
6 | (United States) T Gullikson | 2 | 2
2 | (United States) J Connors | 6 | 6

Semifinals
4 | (United States) V Gerulaitis | 6 | 6 | 3
2 | (United States) J Connors | 7 | 2 | 6
