= 1991 Tokyo Indoor – Doubles =

Doubles
- 1991 Tokyo Indoor

Final
- Champions: (United States) Jim Grabb; (United States) Richey Reneberg
- Runners-up: (United States) Scott Davis; (United States) David Pate
- Score: 7–5, 2–6, 7–6

Details
- Draw: 24
- Seeds: 8

Events
| Singles | Doubles |
| ← 1990 · | Tokyo Indoor | · 1992 → |

Guy Forget and Jakob Hlasek were the defending champions, but did not participate this year.

Jim Grabb and Richey Reneberg won the title, defeating Scott Davis and David Pate 7–5, 2–6, 7–6 in the final.

== Seeds ==
All seeds receive a bye into the second round.

1. (United States) Scott Davis / (United States) David Pate (final)
2. (Canada) Grant Connell / (Canada) Glenn Michibata (semifinals)
3. (Australia) Todd Woodbridge / (Australia) Mark Woodforde (second round)
4. (South Africa) Wayne Ferreira / (South Africa) Piet Norval (second round)
5. (United States) Luke Jensen / (Australia) Laurie Warder (second round)
6. (Croatia) Goran Ivanišević / (South Africa) Gary Muller (semifinals)
7. (Australia) Mark Kratzmann / (Australia) Wally Masur (second round)
8. (United States) Rick Leach / (United States) David Wheaton (quarterfinals)

== Draw ==
=== Key ===
- Q = Qualifier
- WC = Wild card
- LL = Lucky loser
- Alt = Alternate
- SE = Special exempt
- PR = Protected ranking
- ITF = ITF entry
- JE = Junior exempt
- w/o = Walkover
- r = Retired
- d = Defaulted
- SR = Special ranking

=== Finals ===
Semifinals

Final

1
- (United States) Scott Davis
- (United States) David Pate
6
7
6

6
- (Socialist Federal Republic of Yugoslavia) Goran Ivanišević
- (South Africa) Gary Muller
7
6
3

1
- (United States) Scott Davis
- (United States) David Pate
5
6
6

- (United States) Jim Grabb
- (United States) Richey Reneberg
7
2
7

- (United States) Jim Grabb
- (United States) Richey Reneberg
6
6

2
- (Canada) Grant Connell
- (Canada) Glenn Michibata
4
3

=== Top half ===
First round

Second round

Quarterfinals

Semifinals

1
- (United States) S Davis
- (United States) D Pate
7
6

- (United States) B Garnett
- (United States) G Van Emburgh
6
6

- (United States) B Garnett
- (United States) G Van Emburgh
5
4

- (Czechoslovakia) S Doseděl
- (Italy) G Pozzi
4
1

1
- (United States) S Davis
- (United States) D Pate
6
6

- (Sweden) J Gunnarsson
- (Sweden) N Kroon
7
4
6

- (Sweden) J Gunnarsson
- (Sweden) N Kroon
4
1

- (Brazil) D Marcelino
- (United States) J Sobel
5
6
4

- (Sweden) J Gunnarsson
- (Sweden) N Kroon
6
7

7
- (Australia) M Kratzmann
- (Australia) W Masur
4
6

1
- (United States) S Davis
- (United States) D Pate
6
7
6

6
- (Croatia) G Ivanišević
- (South Africa) G Muller
7
6
3

3
- (Australia) T Woodbridge
- (Australia) M Woodforde
4
3

WC
- (Japan) E Furusho
- (Japan) T Sato
4
4

- (Australia) J Fitzgerald
- (Czechoslovakia) I Lendl
6
6

- (Australia) J Fitzgerald
- (Czechoslovakia) I Lendl
6
6

- (Australia) J Fitzgerald
- (Czechoslovakia) I Lendl
4
7
5

- (Japan) S Matsuoka
- (Australia) J Stoltenberg
6
6
7

6
- (Croatia) G Ivanišević
- (South Africa) G Muller
6
6
7

- (Australia) N Borwick
- (Australia) S Youl
7
0
5

- (Japan) S Matsuoka
- (Australia) J Stoltenberg
4
4

6
- (Croatia) G Ivanišević
- (South Africa) G Muller
6
6

=== Bottom half ===
First round

Second round

Quarterfinals

Semifinals

5
- (United States) L Jensen
- (Australia) L Warder
6
3

- (Soviet Union) A Olhovskiy
- (Soviet Union) D Poliakov
7
6

- (Soviet Union) A Olhovskiy
- (Soviet Union) D Poliakov
7
6

- (Germany) B Becker
- (Czechoslovakia) T Šmíd
6
4

- (Soviet Union) A Olhovskiy
- (Soviet Union) D Poliakov
4
3

- (United States) J Grabb
- (United States) R Reneberg
6
6

- (United States) J Grabb
- (United States) R Reneberg
6
6

Q
- (Canada) G Rusedski
- (United States) M Washington
3
3

- (United States) J Grabb
- (United States) R Reneberg
6
3
6

4
- (South Africa) W Ferreira
- (South Africa) P Norval
4
6
2

- (United States) J Grabb
- (United States) R Reneberg
6
6

2
- (Canada) G Connell
- (Canada) G Michibata
4
3

8
- (United States) R Leach
- (United States) D Wheaton
6
6
6

WC
- (United States) C Chang
- (United States) M Chang
6
4

- (Australia) B Dyke
- (Sweden) P Lundgren
3
7
2

- (Australia) B Dyke
- (Sweden) P Lundgren
7
6

8
- (United States) R Leach
- (United States) D Wheaton
6
5
3

- (Mexico) L Herrera
- (Argentina) D Orsanic
6
5
6

2
- (Canada) G Connell
- (Canada) G Michibata
3
7
6

- (Australia) J Anderson
- (Australia) J Morgan
4
7
4

- (Mexico) L Herrera
- (Argentina) D Orsanic
1
6

2
- (Canada) G Connell
- (Canada) G Michibata
6
7
