= 1985 Tokyo Indoor – Singles =

Singles
- 1985 Tokyo Indoor

Final
- Champion: (Czechoslovakia) Ivan Lendl
- Runner-up: (Sweden) Mats Wilander
- Score: 6–0, 6–4

Details
- Draw: 32
- Seeds: 8

Events
Singles	Doubles
← 1984 ·	Tokyo Indoor	· 1986 →

Jimmy Connors was the defending champion, but he withdrew from his semifinals match this year.

Ivan Lendl won the tournament, beating Mats Wilander in the final, 6–0, 6–4.

== Seeds ==
1. (Czechoslovakia) Ivan Lendl (champion)
2. (Sweden) Mats Wilander (final)
3. (United States) Jimmy Connors (semifinals, withdrew)
4. (West Germany) Boris Becker (semifinals)
5. (Sweden) Anders Järryd (quarterfinals)
6. (Ecuador) Andrés Gómez (quarterfinals)
7. (Czechoslovakia) Tomáš Šmíd (first round)
8. (United States) Tim Mayotte (quarterfinals)

== Draw ==
=== Key ===
- Q = Qualifier
- WC = Wild card
- LL = Lucky loser
- Alt = Alternate
- SE = Special exempt
- PR = Protected ranking
- ITF = ITF entry
- JE = Junior exempt
- w/o = Walkover
- r = Retired
- d = Defaulted
- SR = Special ranking

=== Finals ===
Semifinals
1	(Czechoslovakia) Ivan Lendl	6	7^{7}
4	(West Germany) Boris Becker	3	6^{1}
3	(United States) Jimmy Connors
2	(Sweden) Mats Wilander	w/o

Final
1	(Czechoslovakia) Ivan Lendl	6	6
2	(Sweden) Mats Wilander	0	4

=== Top half ===
First round
1	(Czechoslovakia) I Lendl	6	6
(United States) S Davis	4	1
(United States) G Holmes	6	5	4
(United States) D Pate	2	7	6
(United States) B Gilbert	7^{7}	6
WC	(Japan) T Fukui	6^{5}	2
(United States) V Gerulaitis	2	1
8	(United States) T Mayotte	6	6
4	(West Germany) B Becker	6	6
(United States) B Schultz	2	0
(United States) J Sadri	6	6
(United States) J Arias	3	3
(Netherlands) H van Boeckel	6	6
Q	(Egypt) A El-Mehelmy	3	3
(Socialist Federal Republic of Yugoslavia) S Živojinović	1	6	4
5	(Sweden) A Järryd	6	3	6

Second round
1	(Czechoslovakia) I Lendl	6	6
(United States) D Pate	3	3
(United States) B Gilbert	2	2
8	(United States) T Mayotte	6	6
4	(West Germany) B Becker	6	6
(United States) J Sadri	3	1
(Netherlands) H van Boeckel	3	3
5	(Sweden) A Järryd	6	6

Quarterfinals
1	(Czechoslovakia) I Lendl	6	7
8	(United States) T Mayotte	4	5
4	(West Germany) B Becker	7^{10}	6
5	(Sweden) A Järryd	6^{8}	4

Semifinals
1	(Czechoslovakia) I Lendl	6	7^{7}
4	(West Germany) B Becker	3	6^{1}

=== Bottom half ===
First round
7	(Czechoslovakia) T Šmíd	2	6^{5}
WC	(United States) V Van Patten	6	7^{7}
WC	(Japan) S Shiraishi	3	2
(United States) S Giammalva Jr.	6	6
SE	(Sweden) J Carlsson	1	6^{5}
(United States) R Seguso	6	7^{7}
(Australia) J Fitzgerald	0	5
3	(United States) J Connors	6	7
6	(Ecuador) A Gómez	7^{7}	7
Q	(Netherlands) M Oosting	6^{3}	5
SE	(Canada) G Michibata	6	6
Q	(United States) J Canter	3	3
(United States) K Flach	5	4
(Switzerland) J Hlasek	7	6
Q	(United States) R Brown	2	2
2	(Sweden) M Wilander	6	6

Second round
WC	(United States) V Van Patten	7^{10}	6
(United States) S Giammalva Jr.	6^{8}	0
(United States) R Seguso	2	1
3	(United States) J Connors	6	6
6	(Ecuador) A Gómez	6	6
SE	(Canada) G Michibata	2	3
(Switzerland) J Hlasek	3	6	6^{2}
2	(Sweden) M Wilander	6	3	7^{7}

Quarterfinals
WC	(United States) V Van Patten	5	2
3	(United States) J Connors	7	6
6	(Ecuador) A Gómez	4	6	6^{5}
2	(Sweden) M Wilander	6	2	7^{7}

Semifinals
3	(United States) J Connors
2	(Sweden) M Wilander	w/o
