= 1978 Seiko World Super Tennis – Singles =

Singles
- 1978 Tokyo Indoor

Final
- Champion: (Sweden) Björn Borg
- Runner-up: (United States) Brian Teacher
- Score: 6–3, 6–4

Details
- Draw: 32
- Seeds: 8

Events
Singles	Doubles
← 1977 ·	Tokyo Indoor	· 1979 →

This was the first edition of the event.

Björn Borg won the tournament, beating Brian Teacher in the final, 6–3, 6–4.

== Seeds ==
1. (United States) Jimmy Connors (second round)
2. (Sweden) Björn Borg (champion)
3. (United States) Vitas Gerulaitis (quarterfinals)
4. (United States) Eddie Dibbs (quarterfinals)
5. (United States) Harold Solomon (quarterfinals)
6. (United States) Sandy Mayer (semifinals)
7. (Romania) Ilie Năstase (semifinals)
8. (United States) Arthur Ashe (quarterfinals)

== Draw ==
=== Key ===
- Q = Qualifier
- WC = Wild card
- LL = Lucky loser
- Alt = Alternate
- SE = Special exempt
- PR = Protected ranking
- ITF = ITF entry
- JE = Junior exempt
- w/o = Walkover
- r = Retired
- d = Defaulted
- SR = Special ranking

=== Finals ===
Semifinals
(United States) Brian Teacher	6	7
6	(United States) Sandy Mayer	2	5
7	(Romania) Ilie Năstase	2	3
2	(Sweden) Björn Borg	6	6

Final
(United States) Brian Teacher	3	4
2	(Sweden) Björn Borg	6	6

=== Top half ===
First round
1	(United States) J Connors	6	6
(Australia) T Roche	4	2
(United States) B Teacher	6	6	6
(United States) J Borowiak	7	4	3
(Socialist Federal Republic of Yugoslavia) Ž Franulović	6	6
(Japan) J Kamiwazumi	0	0
(Australia) J Alexander	6	7	6
8	(United States) A Ashe	7	5	7
3	(United States) V Gerulaitis	6	6
Q	(Australia) M Edmondson	4	4
(Australia) K Warwick	5	4
(United Kingdom) B Mottram	7	6
(United States) N Saviano	6
(Australia) P Dent	3	r
(United States) T Gorman	5	4
6	(United States) S Mayer	7	6

Second round
1	(United States) J Connors	6	4	3
(United States) B Teacher	4	6	6
(Socialist Federal Republic of Yugoslavia) Ž Franulović	4	3
8	(United States) A Ashe	6	6
3	(United States) V Gerulaitis	7	6
(United Kingdom) B Mottram	5	3
(United States) N Saviano	5	6
6	(United States) S Mayer	7	7

Quarterfinals
(United States) B Teacher	7	7
8	(United States) A Ashe	6	6
3	(United States) V Gerulaitis	3	6	3
6	(United States) S Mayer	6	3	6

Semifinals
(United States) B Teacher	6	7
6	(United States) S Mayer	2	5

=== Bottom half ===
First round
7	(Romania) I Năstase	6	6
(Japan) T Fukui	1	4
Q	(United States) T Moor	4	7	6
(Italy) A Panatta	6	6	0
(United States) T Gullikson	6	6
(Japan) J Kuki	2	2
Q	(Australia) D Carter	1	3
4	(United States) E Dibbs	6	6
5	(United States) H Solomon	4	6	6
(United States) E Teltscher	6	1	4
(South Africa) C Drysdale	6	6
(United States) B Walts	4	4
(United States) D Stockton	4	6	5
(United States) H Pfister	6	3	7
(United States) P Du Pré	1	0
2	(Sweden) B Borg	6	6

Second round
7	(Romania) I Năstase	6	6
Q	(United States) T Moor	4	3
(United States) T Gullikson	7	3	1
4	(United States) E Dibbs	6	6	6
5	(United States) H Solomon	6	7
(South Africa) C Drysdale	3	6
(United States) H Pfister	6	1	3
2	(Sweden) B Borg	3	6	6

Quarterfinals
7	(Romania) I Năstase	4	6	6
4	(United States) E Dibbs	6	3	4
5	(United States) H Solomon	1	2
2	(Sweden) B Borg	6	6

Semifinals
7	(Romania) I Năstase	2	3
2	(Sweden) B Borg	6	6
