= 1985 Tokyo Indoor =

- Date: 15–19 October
- Edition: 8th
- Category: Grand Prix
- Draw: 32S / 16D
- Prize money: $300,000
- Surface: Carpet / indoor
- Location: Tokyo, Japan
- Venue: Yoyogi National Gymnasium

Champions

Singles
- (Czechoslovakia) Ivan Lendl

Doubles
- (United States) Ken Flach / (United States) Robert Seguso
← 1984 ·	Tokyo Indoor	· 1986 →

The 1985 Tokyo Indoor also known as "Seiko Super Tennis" was a men's tennis tournament played on indoor carpet courts at the Yoyogi National Gymnasium in Tokyo, Japan that was part of the 1985 Nabisco Grand Prix. It was the eighth edition of the tournament and was held from 15 October through 19 October 1985. It was a major tournament of the Grand Prix tennis circuit and matches were the best of three sets. First-seeded Ivan Lendl won the singles title.

== Finals ==
=== Singles ===
(Czechoslovakia) Ivan Lendl defeated (Sweden) Mats Wilander 6–0, 6–4

- It was Lendl's 9th singles title of the year and the 51st of his career.

=== Doubles ===
(United States) Ken Flach / (United States) Robert Seguso defeated (United States) Scott Davis / (United States) David Pate 4–6, 6–3, 7–6
