= 1989 Tokyo Indoor – Singles =

Singles
- 1989 Tokyo Indoor

Final
- Champion: (United States) Aaron Krickstein
- Runner-up: (West Germany) Carl-Uwe Steeb
- Score: 6–2, 6–2

Details
- Draw: 32
- Seeds: 8

Events
Singles	Doubles
- Tokyo Indoor

Boris Becker was the defending champion, but did not participate this year.

Aaron Krickstein won the tournament, beating Carl-Uwe Steeb in the final, 6–2, 6–2.

== Seeds ==
1. (Sweden) Stefan Edberg (semifinals)
2. (United States) Andre Agassi (second round)
3. (Switzerland) Jakob Hlasek (second round)
4. (United States) Aaron Krickstein (champion)
5. (West Germany) Carl-Uwe Steeb (final)
6. (Ecuador) Andrés Gómez (second round)
7. (United States) Kevin Curren (first round)
8. (United States) Dan Goldie (second round)

== Draw ==
Key

- Q = Qualifier
- WC = Wild card
- LL = Lucky loser
- Alt = Alternate
- ITF = ITF entry
- PR = Protected ranking
- SR = Special ranking
- SE = Special exempt
- JE = Junior exempt
- JR = Junior Accelerator Programme entrant
- CO = College Accelerator Programme entrant
- NG = Next Gen Accelerator Program entrant
- w/o = Walkover
- r = Retired
- d = Defaulted

=== Finals ===
Semifinals
1	(Sweden) Stefan Edberg	6	6	6
4	(United States) Aaron Krickstein	2	7	7
5	(West Germany) Carl-Uwe Steeb	6	6
(Australia) Darren Cahill	4	4

Final
4	(United States) Aaron Krickstein	6	6
5	(West Germany) Carl-Uwe Steeb	2	2

=== Top half ===
First round
1	(Sweden) S Edberg	6	6
Q	(Canada) G Michibata	1	3
(Sweden) T Högstedt	3	2
(Australia) J Fitzgerald	6	6
WC	(Japan) T Tsuchihashi	6	0
(France) H Leconte	7	6
(West Germany) E Jelen	4	6	6
7	(United States) K Curren	6	4	4
4	(United States) A Krickstein	6	6	7
(Socialist Federal Republic of Yugoslavia) S Živojinović	3	7	6
(United States) J Pugh	3	5
Q	(Australia) B Dyke	6	7
(United States) S Davis	3	3
(Canada) G Connell	6	6
WC	(Japan) H Tanizawa	0	2
6	(Ecuador) A Gómez	6	6

Second round
1	(Sweden) S Edberg	6	6
(Australia) J Fitzgerald	2	3
(France) H Leconte	4	7	6
(West Germany) E Jelen	6	6	4
4	(United States) A Krickstein	3	6	6
Q	(Australia) B Dyke	6	3	4
(Canada) G Connell	2	6	6
6	(Ecuador) A Gómez	6	1	4

Quarterfinals
1	(Sweden) S Edberg	6	7
(France) H Leconte	1	6
4	(United States) A Krickstein	6	6
(Canada) G Connell	3	4

Semifinals
1	(Sweden) S Edberg	6	6	6
4	(United States) A Krickstein	2	7	7

=== Bottom half ===
First round
5	(West Germany) C-U Steeb	6	6
Q	(United States) P McEnroe	4	2
(United States) L Shiras	6	6
WC	(United States) T Ho	4	2
(Australia) B Drewett	2	7	6
Q	(United States) R Leach	6	6	7
(United States) R Reneberg	7	3	2
3	(Switzerland) J Hlasek	6	6	6
8	(United States) D Goldie	6	6
(United States) P Chamberlin	4	4
(United States) R Matuszewski	6	6	2
(Australia) D Cahill	7	3	6
(Japan) S Matsuoka	7	2	5
(Haiti) R Agénor	6	6	7
(Australia) W Masur	3	4
2	(United States) A Agassi	6	6

Second round
5	(West Germany) C-U Steeb	6	6
(United States) L Shiras	1	4
Q	(United States) R Leach	4	7	6
3	(Switzerland) J Hlasek	6	6	4
8	(United States) D Goldie	6	4
(Australia) D Cahill	7	6
(Haiti) R Agénor	6	6
2	(United States) A Agassi	0	3

Quarterfinals
5	(West Germany) C-U Steeb	6	7
Q	(United States) R Leach	4	5
(Australia) D Cahill	3	7	6
(Haiti) R Agénor	6	6	4

Semifinals
5	(West Germany) C-U Steeb	6	6
(Australia) D Cahill	4	4
