= 1989 Tokyo Indoor – Doubles =

Doubles
- 1989 Tokyo Indoor

Final
- Champions: (United States) Kevin Curren (United States) David Pate
- Runners-up: (Ecuador) Andrés Gómez (Socialist Federal Republic of Yugoslavia) Slobodan Živojinović
- Score: 4–6, 6–3, 7–6

Details
- Draw: 16
- Seeds: 4

Events
Singles	Doubles
- Tokyo Indoor

Andrés Gómez and Slobodan Živojinović were the defending champions, but lost in the final this year.

Kevin Curren and David Pate won the title, defeating Gómez and Živojinović 4–6, 6–3, 7–6 in the final.

== Seeds ==
1. (United States) Rick Leach / (United States) Jim Pugh (semifinals)
2. (Australia) John Fitzgerald / (United States) Patrick McEnroe (first round)
3. (United States) Kevin Curren / (United States) David Pate (champions)
4. (Australia) Darren Cahill / (Australia) Mark Kratzmann (first round)

== Draw ==
Key

- Q = Qualifier
- WC = Wild card
- LL = Lucky loser
- Alt = Alternate
- ITF = ITF entry
- PR = Protected ranking
- SR = Special ranking
- SE = Special exempt
- JE = Junior exempt
- JR = Junior Accelerator Programme entrant
- CO = College Accelerator Programme entrant
- NG = Next Gen Accelerator Program entrant
- w/o = Walkover
- r = Retired
- d = Defaulted

=== Draw ===
First round
1	(United States) R Leach (United States) J Pugh	6	6
(Japan) Takeshi Murakami (Japan) H Shirato	4	4
(Haiti) R Agénor (Australia) B Drewett	7	1	3
(United States) P Chamberlin (United States) D Goldie	6	6	6
4	(Australia) D Cahill (Australia) M Kratzmann	6	6	6
(Ecuador) A Gómez (Socialist Federal Republic of Yugoslavia) S Živojinović	2	7	7
(United States) S Davis (United States) R Van't Hof	4	7	3
(Australia) D Macpherson (United States) L Shiras	6	6	6
(Australia) B Dyke (Australia) W Masur	6	6
(West Germany) E Jelen (West Germany) C-U Steeb	2	3
(Japan) H Nakano (Japan) S Ota	6	0
3	(United States) K Curren (United States) D Pate	7	6
(Canada) G Connell (Canada) G Michibata	4	1
(United States) B Pearce (United States) R Reneberg	6	6
(Sweden) S Edberg (Switzerland) J Hlasek	7	5	7
2	(Australia) J Fitzgerald (United States) P McEnroe	6	7	5

Quarterfinals
1	(United States) R Leach (United States) J Pugh	5	7	7
(United States) P Chamberlin (United States) D Goldie	7	6	6
(Ecuador) A Gómez (Socialist Federal Republic of Yugoslavia) S Živojinović	7	4	6
(Australia) D Macpherson (United States) L Shiras	6	6	4
(Australia) B Dyke (Australia) W Masur	4	6
3	(United States) K Curren (United States) D Pate	6	7
(United States) B Pearce (United States) R Reneberg	6	7
(Sweden) S Edberg (Switzerland) J Hlasek	4	6

Semifinals
1	(United States) R Leach (United States) J Pugh	6	4	3
(Ecuador) A Gómez (Socialist Federal Republic of Yugoslavia) S Živojinović	4	6	6
3	(United States) K Curren (United States) D Pate	5	6	6
(United States) B Pearce (United States) R Reneberg	7	3	4

Final
(Ecuador) A Gómez (Socialist Federal Republic of Yugoslavia) S Živojinović	6	3	6
3	(United States) K Curren (United States) D Pate	4	6	7
