= 1978 Seiko World Super Tennis – Doubles =

Doubles
- 1978 Seiko World Super Tennis

Final
- Champions: (Australia) Ross Case (Australia) Geoff Masters
- Runners-up: (United States) Pat Du Pré (United States) Tom Gorman
- Score: 6–3, 6–4

Details
- Draw: 16
- Seeds: 4

Events
Singles	Doubles
- Tokyo Indoor

This was the first edition of the tennis tournament.

Ross Case and Geoff Masters won the doubles title, defeating Pat Du Pré and Tom Gorman 6–3, 6–4 in the final.

== Seeds ==
1. (United States) Sherwood Stewart / (United States) Dick Stockton (quarterfinals)
2. (Australia) John Alexander / (Australia) Syd Ball (first round)
3. (Australia) Mark Edmondson / (Australia) John Marks (quarterfinals)
4. (United States) Arthur Ashe / (Romania) Ilie Năstase (semifinals)

== Draw ==
Key

- Q = Qualifier
- WC = Wild card
- LL = Lucky loser
- Alt = Alternate
- ITF = ITF entry
- PR = Protected ranking
- SR = Special ranking
- SE = Special exempt
- JE = Junior exempt
- JR = Junior Accelerator Programme entrant
- CO = College Accelerator Programme entrant
- NG = Next Gen Accelerator Program entrant
- w/o = Walkover
- r = Retired
- d = Defaulted

=== Draw ===
First round
1	(United States) S Stewart (United States) D Stockton	7	7
(Italy) A Panatta (Australia) K Warwick	6	6
(United States) P Du Pré (United States) T Gorman	6	6
(Australia) C Kachel (India) S Menon	4	3
4	(United States) A Ashe (Romania) I Năstase	6	1	7
(South Africa) C Drysdale (United States) T Moor	2	6	6
(United States) N Saviano (United States) E Teltscher	7	6
(United States) T Gullikson (United States) B Walts	6	3
(Japan) K Hirai (Japan) J Kamiwazumi	6	3	3
(Australia) R Case (Australia) G Masters	3	6	6
(United States) J Borowiak (Australia) D Carter	1	2
3	(Australia) M Edmondson (Australia) J Marks	6	6
(Australia) C Dibley (United States) B Teacher	7	6	6
(United States) M Cahill (United States) H Pfister	6	7	7
(Socialist Federal Republic of Yugoslavia) Ž Franulović (United Kingdom) B Mottram	7	6
2	(Australia) J Alexander (Australia) S Ball	6	3

Quarterfinals
1	(United States) S Stewart (United States) D Stockton	6	3
(United States) P Du Pré (United States) T Gorman	7	6
4	(United States) A Ashe (Romania) I Năstase	6	6
(United States) N Saviano (United States) E Teltscher	3	3
(Australia) R Case (Australia) G Masters	7	1	6
3	(Australia) M Edmondson (Australia) J Marks	5	6	2
(United States) M Cahill (United States) H Pfister	6	7
(Socialist Federal Republic of Yugoslavia) Ž Franulović (United Kingdom) B Mottram	3	5

Semifinals
(United States) P Du Pré (United States) T Gorman	6	7
4	(United States) A Ashe (Romania) I Năstase	2	6
(Australia) R Case (Australia) G Masters	7	3	7
(United States) M Cahill (United States) H Pfister	6	6	5

Final
(United States) P Du Pré (United States) T Gorman	3	4
(Australia) R Case (Australia) G Masters	6	6
