= 1984 Tokyo Indoor =

- Date: 15–19 October
- Edition: 7th
- Category: Grand Prix
- Draw: 32S / 16D
- Prize money: $300,000
- Surface: Carpet / indoor
- Location: Tokyo, Japan
- Venue: Yoyogi National Gymnasium

Champions

Singles
- (United States) Jimmy Connors

Doubles
- (United States) Sammy Giammalva Jr. / (United States) Tony Giammalva
← 1983 ·	Tokyo Indoor	· 1985 →

The 1984 Tokyo Indoor, also known by its sponsored name Seiko Super Tennis, was a men's tennis tournament played on indoor carpet courts at the Yoyogi National Gymnasium in Tokyo, Japan that was part of the 1984 Volvo Grand Prix. It was the seventh edition of the tournament and was held from 15 October through 19 October 1984. Matches were the best of three sets. First-seeded Jimmy Connors won the singles title, his second at the event after 1980, and earned $60,000 first-prize money.

== Finals ==
=== Singles ===
(United States) Jimmy Connors defeated (Czechoslovakia) Ivan Lendl 6–4, 3–6, 6–0

- It was Connors' 5th singles title of the year and the 105th of his career.

=== Doubles ===
(United States) Sammy Giammalva Jr. / (United States) Tony Giammalva defeated (Australia) Mark Edmondson / (United States) Sherwood Stewart 7–6, 6–4
