= Juan Rostagno =

Argentine sports shooter

Personal information
- Born: 1 April 1899 Buenos Aires, Argentina
- Died: 28 March 1978 (aged 78)

Sport
- Sport: Sports shooting

Juan Rostagno (1 April 1899 – 28 March 1978) was an Argentine sports shooter. He competed at the 1936 Summer Olympics and 1948 Summer Olympics.

His grandson is American tennis player Derrick Rostagno.
