= 1993 Tokyo Indoor – Doubles =

Men's tennis tournament

Doubles
- 1993 Tokyo Indoor

Final
- Champions: (Canada) Grant Connell; (United States) Patrick Galbraith
- Runners-up: (United States) Luke Jensen; (United States) Murphy Jensen
- Score: 6–3, 6–4

Details
- Draw: 24
- Seeds: 8

Events
Singles	Doubles
- Tokyo Indoor

Todd Woodbridge and Mark Woodforde were the defending champions, but lost in the second round this year.

Grant Connell and Patrick Galbraith won the title, defeating Luke Jensen and Murphy Jensen 6–3, 6–4 in the final.

== Seeds ==
All seeds receive a bye into the second round.

1. (Australia) Todd Woodbridge / (Australia) Mark Woodforde (second round)
2. (Australia) John Fitzgerald / (Sweden) Anders Järryd (semifinals)
3. (Canada) Grant Connell / (United States) Patrick Galbraith (champions)
4. (United States) Patrick McEnroe / (United States) Richey Reneberg (semifinals)
5. (Netherlands) Jacco Eltingh / (Netherlands) Paul Haarhuis (second round)
6. (United States) Ken Flach / (United States) Rick Leach (quarterfinals)
7. (United States) Luke Jensen / (United States) Murphy Jensen (final)
8. (Sweden) Stefan Edberg / (Sweden) Henrik Holm (quarterfinals)

== Draw ==
Key

- Q = Qualifier
- WC = Wild card
- LL = Lucky loser
- Alt = Alternate
- ITF = ITF entry
- PR = Protected ranking
- SR = Special ranking
- SE = Special exempt
- JE = Junior exempt
- JR = Junior Accelerator Programme entrant
- CO = College Accelerator Programme entrant
- NG = Next Gen Accelerator Program entrant
- w/o = Walkover
- r = Retired
- d = Defaulted

=== Finals ===
Semifinals

Final

7
- (United States) Luke Jensen
- (United States) Murphy Jensen
6
1
7

4
- (United States) John McEnroe
- (United States) Richey Reneberg
4
6
6

7
- (United States) Luke Jensen
- (United States) Murphy Jensen
3
4

3
- (Canada) Grant Connell
- (United States) Patrick Galbraith
6
6

3
- (Canada) Grant Connell
- (United States) Patrick Galbraith
7
6

2
- (Australia) John Fitzgerald
- (Sweden) Anders Järryd
6
1

=== Top half ===
First round

Second round

Quarterfinals

Semifinals

1
- (Australia) T Woodbridge
- (Australia) M Woodforde
4
2

- (United States) M Keil
- (South Africa) C van Rensburg
6
7
4

- (Germany) B Becker
- (Germany) P Kühnen
6
6

- (Germany) B Becker
- (Germany) P Kühnen
7
6
6

- (Germany) B Becker
- (Germany) P Kühnen
3
7
1

- (Australia) J Morgan
- (Australia) L Warder
6
5
6

7
- (United States) L Jensen
- (United States) M Jensen
6
6
6

WC
- (United States) I Lendl
- (Sweden) J Svensson
4
7
3

- (Australia) J Morgan
- (Australia) L Warder
2
6

7
- (United States) L Jensen
- (United States) M Jensen
6
7

7
- (United States) L Jensen
- (United States) M Jensen
6
1
7

4
- (United States) P McEnroe
- (United States) R Reneberg
4
6
6

4
- (United States) P McEnroe
- (United States) R Reneberg
6
7

Q
- (Australia) M Tebbutt
- (Germany) M Zoecke
7
4
7

Q
- (Australia) M Tebbutt
- (Germany) M Zoecke
3
5

WC
- (Japan) S Matsuoka
- (Canada) G Rusedski
5
6
6

4
- (United States) P McEnroe
- (United States) R Reneberg
6
6

- (South Africa) W Ferreira
- (Netherlands) R Krajicek
6
1
6

- (South Africa) W Ferreira
- (Netherlands) R Krajicek
4
4

- (United States) S Davis
- (United States) T Martin
3
6
3

- (South Africa) W Ferreira
- (Netherlands) R Krajicek
6
1
7

5
- (Netherlands) J Eltingh
- (Netherlands) P Haarhuis
3
6
6

=== Bottom half ===
First round

Second round

Quarterfinals

Semifinals

6
- (United States) K Flach
- (United States) R Leach
7
6

- (Canada) G Michibata
- (United States) D Pate
3
6
6

- (Canada) G Michibata
- (United States) D Pate
5
3

- (Sweden) J Björkman
- (Australia) P Rafter
6
4
3

6
- (United States) K Flach
- (United States) R Leach
3
5

- (Australia) S Stolle
- (Sweden) L-A Wahlgren
6
6

3
- (Canada) G Connell
- (United States) P Galbraith
6
7

WC
- (Japan) G Motomura
- (Japan) T Sato
3
4

- (Australia) S Stolle
- (Sweden) L-A Wahlgren
2
3

3
- (Canada) G Connell
- (United States) P Galbraith
6
6

3
- (Canada) G Connell
- (United States) P Galbraith
7
6

2
- (Australia) J Fitzgerald
- (Sweden) A Järryd
6
1

8
- (Sweden) S Edberg
- (Sweden) H Holm
7
6

- (Australia) H Denman
- (Australia) G Doyle
7
6
6

- (Australia) N Borwick
- (United States) K Thorne
5
3

- (Australia) N Borwick
- (United States) K Thorne
6
7
7

8
- (Sweden) S Edberg
- (Sweden) H Holm
3
6
6

- (United States) P Annacone
- (United States) D Flach
5
1

2
- (Australia) J Fitzgerald
- (Sweden) A Järryd
6
1
7

- (Croatia) G Ivanišević
- (Ukraine) A Medvedev
7
6

- (Croatia) G Ivanišević
- (Ukraine) A Medvedev
3
6
4

2
- (Australia) J Fitzgerald
- (Sweden) A Järryd
6
2
6
