= 1993 Tokyo Indoor – Singles =

Singles
- 1993 Tokyo Indoor

Final
- Champion: (United States) Ivan Lendl
- Runner-up: (United States) Todd Martin
- Score: 6–4, 6–4

Details
- Draw: 48
- Seeds: 16

Events
| Singles | Doubles |
- Tokyo Indoor

Ivan Lendl was the defending champion and successfully defended his title, defeating Todd Martin in the final, 6–4, 6–4.

== Seeds ==
1. (Sweden) Stefan Edberg (quarterfinals)
2. (Germany) Boris Becker (quarterfinals)
3. (United States) Michael Chang (quarterfinals)
4. (Ukraine) Andrei Medvedev (quarterfinals)
5. (Croatia) Goran Ivanišević (third round)
6. (Netherlands) Richard Krajicek (third round)
7. (Czech Republic) Petr Korda (third round)
8. (Russia) Alexander Volkov (third round)
9. (United States) Ivan Lendl (champion)
10. (United States) Todd Martin (final)
11. (South Africa) Wayne Ferreira (second round)
12. (Sweden) Henrik Holm (second round)
13. (Australia) Mark Woodforde (third round)
14. (United States) Richey Reneberg (second round)
15. (Sweden) Jonas Svensson (third round)
16. (Sweden) Mikael Pernfors (second round)

== Draw ==
Key

- Q = Qualifier
- WC = Wild card
- LL = Lucky loser
- Alt = Alternate
- ITF = ITF entry
- PR = Protected ranking
- SR = Special ranking
- SE = Special exempt
- JE = Junior exempt
- JR = Junior Accelerator Programme entrant
- CO = College Accelerator Programme entrant
- NG = Next Gen Accelerator Program entrant
- w/o = Walkover
- r = Retired
- d = Defaulted

=== Finals ===
Semifinals
10 | (United States) Todd Martin | 7^{7} | 6
(Canada) Greg Rusedski | 6^{5} | 3
(Netherlands) Paul Haarhuis | 6 | 4 | 6^{5}
9 | (United States) Ivan Lendl | 3 | 6 | 7^{7}

Final
10 | (United States) Todd Martin | 4 | 4
9 | (United States) Ivan Lendl | 6 | 6

=== Top half ===
==== Section 1 ====
First round
(United States) C Adams | 6 | 6
WC | (Japan) H Kaneko | 3 | 3
(Germany) P Kühnen | 4 | 4
Q | (Japan) R Tsujino | 6 | 6
(Sweden) A Järryd | 6 | 6
(Germany) M Zoecke | 3 | 3
Q | (Australia) J Fitzgerald | 4 | 4
Q | (Australia) M Tebbutt | 6 | 6

Second round
1 | (Sweden) S Edberg | 7^{11} | 7^{8}
(United States) C Adams | 6^{9} | 6^{6}
Q | (Japan) R Tsujino | 6^{6} | 3
15 | (Sweden) J Svensson | 7^{8} | 6
10 | (United States) T Martin | 6 | 6
(Sweden) A Järryd | 3 | 4
Q | (Australia) M Tebbutt | 4 | 4
7 | (Czech Republic) P Korda | 6 | 6

Third round
1 | (Sweden) S Edberg | 6 | 6
15 | (Sweden) J Svensson | 2 | 4
10 | (United States) T Martin | 6 | 6
7 | (Czech Republic) P Korda | 3 | 3

Quarterfinals
1 | (Sweden) S Edberg | 4 | 4
10 | (United States) T Martin | 6 | 6

==== Section 2 ====
First round
(Peru) J Yzaga | 5 | 6^{2}
(South Africa) C Van Rensburg | 7 | 7^{7}
(Canada) C Pridham | 7^{9} | 6
(United States) K Thorne | 6^{7} | 4
(United States) R Weiss | 4 | 4
(Canada) G Rusedski | 6 | 6
WC | (Japan) Y Yamamoto | 4 | 3
(Australia) J Morgan | 6 | 6

Second round
3 | (United States) M Chang | 6 | 6
(South Africa) C Van Rensburg | 3 | 4
(Canada) C Pridham | 7^{12} | 6^{5} | 0
13 | (Australia) M Woodforde | 6^{10} | 7^{7} | 6
11 | (South Africa) W Ferreira | 6 | 3 | 5
(Canada) G Rusedski | 4 | 6 | 7
(Australia) J Morgan | 6^{5} | 3
6 | (Netherlands) R Krajicek | 7^{7} | 6

Third round
3 | (United States) M Chang | 4 | 6 | 6
13 | (Australia) M Woodforde | 6 | 1 | 3
(Canada) G Rusedski | 6 | 6^{4} | 7^{7}
6 | (Netherlands) R Krajicek | 4 | 7^{7} | 6^{2}

Quarterfinals
3 | (United States) M Chang | 6 | 3 | 6^{6}
(Canada) G Rusedski | 4 | 6 | 7^{8}

=== Bottom half ===
==== Section 3 ====
First round
(Sweden) J Björkman | 6 | 6
(Switzerland) C Mezzadri | 4 | 4
(Netherlands) P Haarhuis | 6 | 7^{7}
Q | (Sweden) L-A Wahlgren | 3 | 6^{2}
(Australia) P Rafter | 6 | 6
Q | (South Korea) B-S Kim | 4 | 4
(United States) D Flach | 7^{7} | 6^{8} | 5
(Netherlands) J Eltingh | 6^{4} | 7^{10} | 7

Second round
5 | (Croatia) G Ivanišević | 6 | 7
(Sweden) J Björkman | 3 | 5
(Netherlands) P Haarhuis | 6 | 6
12 | (Sweden) H Holm | 4 | 4
14 | (United States) R Reneberg | 6 | 4 | 6^{4}
(Australia) P Rafter | 3 | 6 | 7^{7}
(Netherlands) J Eltingh | 5 | 6^{5}
4 | (Ukraine) A Medvedev | 7 | 7^{7}

Third round
5 | (Croatia) G Ivanišević | 2 | 2
(Netherlands) P Haarhuis | 6 | 6
(Australia) P Rafter | 4 | 4
4 | (Ukraine) A Medvedev | 6 | 6

Quarterfinals
(Netherlands) P Haarhuis | 7 | 6
4 | (Ukraine) A Medvedev | 5 | 1

==== Section 4 ====
First round
(Australia) T Woodbridge | 3 | 1
(United States) S Bryan | 6 | 6
(United States) T Ho | 6 | 7
(Japan) S Matsuoka | 4 | 5
WC | (Japan) S Iwabuchi | 0 | 4
(United States) P McEnroe | 6 | 6
WC | (Japan) G Motomura | 3 | 3
Q | (Australia) N Borwick | 6 | 6

Second round
8 | (Russia) A Volkov | 6 | 6
(United States) S Bryan | 1 | 4
(United States) T Ho | 3 | 4
9 | (United States) I Lendl | 6 | 6
16 | (Sweden) M Pernfors | 6^{2} | 4
(United States) P McEnroe | 7^{7} | 6
Q | (Australia) N Borwick | 2 | 2
2 | (Germany) B Becker | 6 | 6

Third round
8 | (Russia) A Volkov | 7^{7} | 2 | 4
9 | (United States) I Lendl | 6^{1} | 6 | 6
(United States) P McEnroe | 1 | 6^{2}
2 | (Germany) B Becker | 6 | 7^{7}

Quarterfinals
9 | (United States) I Lendl | 6 | 1 | 7^{7}
2 | (Germany) B Becker | 3 | 6 | 6^{2}
