= 1984 Tokyo Indoor – Doubles =

Doubles
- 1984 Tokyo Indoor

Final
- Champions: (United States) Sammy Giammalva Jr. (United States) Tony Giammalva
- Runners-up: (Australia) Mark Edmondson (United States) Sherwood Stewart
- Score: 7–6, 6–4

Details
- Draw: 16
- Seeds: 4

Events
Singles	Doubles
- Tokyo Indoor

Mark Edmondson and Sherwood Stewart were the defending champions, but lost in the final this year.

Sammy Giammalva Jr. and Tony Giammalva won the title, defeating Edmondson and Stewart 7–6, 6–4 in the final.

== Seeds ==
1. (Sweden) Anders Järryd / (Czechoslovakia) Tomáš Šmíd (semifinals)
2. (Australia) Mark Edmondson / (United States) Sherwood Stewart (final)
3. (United States) Ken Flach / (United States) Robert Seguso (semifinals)
4. (Australia) John Fitzgerald / (United States) Ferdi Taygan (quarterfinals)

== Draw ==
Key

- Q = Qualifier
- WC = Wild card
- LL = Lucky loser
- Alt = Alternate
- ITF = ITF entry
- PR = Protected ranking
- SR = Special ranking
- SE = Special exempt
- JE = Junior exempt
- JR = Junior Accelerator Programme entrant
- CO = College Accelerator Programme entrant
- NG = Next Gen Accelerator Program entrant
- w/o = Walkover
- r = Retired
- d = Defaulted

=== Draw ===
First round
1	(Sweden) A Järryd (Czechoslovakia) T Šmíd	6	7
(United States) D Gitlin (United States) E Korita	7	6	4
(United States) D Dowlen (Nigeria) N Odizor	6	2
(United States) M Dickson (United States) H Pfister	7	6
4	(Australia) J Fitzgerald (United States) F Taygan	6	6
(United States) L Stefanki (United States) R Van't Hof	0	4
(United States) B Manson (United States) D Pate	6	7	5
(United States) S Giammalva Jr. (United States) T Giammalva	7	6	7
(United States) Ti Gullikson (United States) To Gullikson	6	2
(United States) S Davis (United States) B Testerman	7	6
(Japan) S Nishio (Japan) S Sakamoto	2	4
3	(United States) K Flach (United States) R Seguso	6	6
(United States) M Davis (United States) C Dunk	6	6	5
(Paraguay) F González (United States) S Meister	4	7	7
(Hungary) Z Kuhárszky (Sweden) M Wilander	7	3	4
2	(Australia) M Edmondson (United States) S Stewart	6	6	6

Quarterfinals
1	(Sweden) A Järryd (Czechoslovakia) T Šmíd	6	6
(United States) M Dickson (United States) H Pfister	2	3
4	(Australia) J Fitzgerald (United States) F Taygan	5	2
(United States) S Giammalva Jr. (United States) T Giammalva	7	6
(United States) S Davis (United States) B Testerman	5	3
3	(United States) K Flach (United States) R Seguso	7	6
(Paraguay) F González (United States) S Meister	2	3
2	(Australia) M Edmondson (United States) S Stewart	6	6

Semifinals
1	(Sweden) A Järryd (Czechoslovakia) T Šmíd	6	6
(United States) S Giammalva Jr. (United States) T Giammalva	7	7
3	(United States) K Flach (United States) R Seguso	7	2	3
2	(Australia) M Edmondson (United States) S Stewart	6	6	6

Final
(United States) S Giammalva Jr. (United States) T Giammalva	7	6
2	(Australia) M Edmondson (United States) S Stewart	6	4
