= 1992 Tokyo Indoor =

- Date: 12–18 October
- Edition: 15th
- Category: ATP Championship Series
- Draw: 64S / 32D
- Prize money: $825,000
- Surface: Carpet / indoor
- Location: Tokyo, Japan

Champions

Singles
- (Czechoslovakia) Ivan Lendl

Doubles
- (Australia) Todd Woodbridge / (Australia) Mark Woodforde
- Tokyo Indoor

The 1992 Tokyo Indoor also known as "Seiko Super Tennis" was a men's tennis tournament played on indoor carpet courta in Tokyo, Japan that was part of the 1992 ATP Tour and was an ATP Championship Series event, today known as the ATP World Tour 500 series. It was the 15th edition of the tournament and was held from 12 October through 18 October 1992. Matches were the best of three sets. Fifth-seeded Ivan Lendl won the singles title, his fourth at the event.

== Finals ==
=== Singles ===
(United States) Ivan Lendl defeated (Sweden) Henrik Holm 7–6^{(9–7)}, 6–4

- It was Lendl's only singles title of the year and the 92nd of his career.

=== Doubles ===
(Australia) Todd Woodbridge / (Australia) Mark Woodforde defeated (United States) Jim Grabb / (United States) Richey Reneberg 7–6, 6–4
