= 1980 Seiko World Super Tennis =

- Date: 27 October – 2 November
- Edition: 3rd
- Category: Grand Prix circuit
- Draw: 32S / 16D
- Prize money: $300,000
- Surface: Carpet / indoor
- Location: Tokyo, Japan
- Venue: Olympic Pool Arena

Champions

Singles
- (United States) Jimmy Connors

Doubles
- (United States) Victor Amaya / (United States) Hank Pfister
- Tokyo Indoor

The 1980 Tokyo Indoor, also known by its sponsored name "Seiko World Super Tennis", was a men's tennis tournament played on indoor carpet courts at the Olympic Pool Arena in Tokyo, Japan that was part of the 1980 Volvo Grand Prix circuit. The tournament was held from 27 October through 2 November 1980. It was a major tournament of the Grand Prix tennis circuit and matches were the best of three sets. Second-seeded Jimmy Connors won the singles title and the accompanying $48,000 first-prize money.

== Finals ==
=== Singles ===
(United States) Jimmy Connors defeated (United States) Tim Gullikson 6–1, 6–2

- It was Connors's 6th singles title of the year and the 85th of his career.

=== Doubles ===
(United States) Victor Amaya / (United States) Hank Pfister defeated (United States) Marty Riessen / (United States) Sherwood Stewart 6–3, 3–6, 7–6
