= 1989 Tokyo Indoor =

- Date: 18–23 October
- Edition: 12th
- Draw: 32S / 16D
- Prize money: $500,000
- Surface: Carpet / indoor
- Location: Tokyo, Japan
- Venue: Yoyogi National Gymnasium

Champions

Singles
- (United States) Aaron Krickstein

Doubles
- (United States) Kevin Curren / (United States) David Pate
- Tokyo Indoor

The 1989 Tokyo Indoor, also known by its sponsored name Seiko Super Tennis, was a men's tennis tournament played on indoor carpet courts at the Yoyogi National Gymnasium in Tokyo, Japan that was part of the 1989 Nabisco Grand Prix. The tournament was held from 18 October through 23 October 1989. It was a major tournament of the Grand Prix tennis circuit and matches were the best of three sets. Fourth-seeded Aaron Krickstein won the singles title.

== Finals ==
=== Singles ===
(United States) Aaron Krickstein defeated (West Germany) Carl Uwe Steeb 6–2, 6–2

- It was Krickstein's 3rd singles title of the year and the 7th of his career.

=== Doubles ===
(United States) Kevin Curren / (United States) David Pate defeated (Ecuador) Andrés Gómez / (Socialist Federal Republic of Yugoslavia) Slobodan Živojinović 4–6, 6–3, 7–6
