= 1986 Tokyo Indoor =

1986 sports event (tennis)

- Date: 20–24 October
- Edition: 9th
- Category: Grand Prix
- Draw: 32S / 16D
- Surface: Carpet / indoor
- Location: Tokyo, Japan
- Venue: Yoyogi National Gymnasium

Champions

Singles
- (West Germany) Boris Becker

Doubles
- (United States) Mike De Palmer / (United States) Gary Donnelly
- Tokyo Indoor

The 1986 Tokyo Indoor also known as "Seiko Super Tennis" was a men's tennis tournament played on indoor carpet courts at the Yoyogi National Gymnasium in Tokyo, Japan that was part of the 1986 Nabisco Grand Prix. It was the ninth edition of the tournament and was held from 20 October through 24 October 1986. Matches were the best of three sets. Second-seeded Boris Becker won the singles title.

== Finals ==
=== Singles ===
(West Germany) Boris Becker defeated (Sweden) Stefan Edberg 7–6, 6–1

=== Doubles ===
(United States) Gary Donnelly / (United States) Mike De Palmer defeated (Ecuador) Andrés Gómez / (Czechoslovakia) Ivan Lendl 6–3, 7–5
