= 1979 Seiko World Super Tennis =

Tennis tournament

- Date: 30 October – 4 November
- Edition: 2nd
- Category: Grand Prix
- Draw: 32S / 16D
- Prize money: $300,000
- Surface: Carpet / indoor
- Location: Tokyo, Japan
- Venue: Tokyo Municipal Gym

Champions

Singles
- (Sweden) Björn Borg

Doubles
- (United States) Marty Riessen / (United States) Sherwood Stewart
- Tokyo Indoor

The Seiko World Super Tennis, also known as the Tokyo Indoor, was a men's tennis tournament played on indoor carpet courts at the Tokyo Municipal Gym in Tokyo, Japan that was part of the 1979 Colgate-Palmolive Grand Prix. The tournament was held from 30 October through 4 November 1979. It was a tournament of the Grand Prix tennis circuit and matches were the best of three sets. Reigning champions and first-seeded Björn Borg won the singles title.

== Finals ==
=== Singles ===
(Sweden) Björn Borg defeated (United States) Jimmy Connors 6–2, 6–2

- It was Borg's 11th singles title of the year and the 50th of his career.

=== Doubles ===
(United States) Marty Riessen / (United States) Sherwood Stewart defeated (United States) Mike Cahill / (United States) Terry Moor 6–4, 7–6

== See also ==
- Borg–Connors rivalry
