= ATP International Series Gold =

Series of professional tennis tournaments (1990–2008)

Logo of the International Series Gold tier between 2000 and 2008

ATP International Series Gold (known from 1990 to 1999 as the ATP Championship Series) was a series of professional tennis tournaments held internationally between 2000 and 2008 that were part of the ATP Tour. The tournaments were positioned below the ATP Masters Series, and above the ATP International Series in terms of prize money and ranking points available.

International Series Gold tournaments offered players cash prizes (purses from $755,000 to $1,426,250 as of 2008) and the ability to earn ATP ranking points. See Association of Tennis Professionals#ATP rankings for more details.

Effective in 2009, this series of tournaments became the ATP Tour 500, incorporating many of the same tournaments. The "500" represents the number of ATP ranking points earned by the winner of each event in the series.

== History ==
In 1989 the ITF Grand Prix Circuit and WCT Circuit were both discontinued. Its tournaments were absorbed into the new ATP Tour in 1990.

The new tour was made up of three global series (tiers) of tournaments, the ATP Championship Series (Single Week), the ATP Championship Series this tier and the ATP World Series.

The nine most prestigious Grand Prix Super Series tournaments became the Championship Series Single Week events, nine other super series, and one regular series event together with two new tournaments formed the first Championship Series tier group.

Between 1990 and 1999 a total of twenty one tournaments had been granted ATP championship series status, though usually twelve or eleven events comprised the tier in any particular given season. In 2000 it was renamed the ATP International Series Gold.

== Tournaments ==
The locations and titles of these tournaments may change from year to year. The tournaments, in calendar order, are:

Tournament	Country	Location	Court surface	2008 Prize Money	Draw Size	Began (as ISG)
ABN AMRO WTT	Netherlands	Rotterdam	Indoor Hard	$824,000	32	1972 (2000)
RMK Championships	United States	Memphis	Indoor Hard	$769,000	32	1975 (2000)
Dubai Tennis Championships	United Arab Emirates	Dubai	Hard	$1,426,000	32	1993 (2001)
Abierto Mexicano Telcel	Mexico	Acapulco	Clay	$794,000	32	1993 (2000)
Open Sabadell Atlántico	Spain	Barcelona	Clay	$888,000	56	1953 (2000)
Mercedes Cup	Germany	Stuttgart	Clay	$568,000	32	1916 (2000)
Generali Open	Austria	Kitzbühel	Clay	$571,000	48	1945 (2000)
Japan Open Tennis Championships	Japan	Tokyo	Hard	$869,000	48	1972 (2000)
BA-CA TennisTrophy	Austria	Vienna	Indoor Hard	$674,000	32	1974 (2000)

== Singles champions ==
=== ATP Championship Series ===
Tournament	1990	1991	1992	1993	1994	1995	1996	1997	1998	1999
Brussels	Becker (1/9)	Forget (1/1)	Becker (5/9)	Not an event						
Antwerp	Invitational		ATP World Series			Not an event	Stich (3/3)	Rosset (1/2)	Rusedski (1/3)	Not an event
Toronto Indoor	Lendl (1/6)	Not an event								
Memphis	ATP World Series	Lendl (3/6)	Washington (1/1)	Courier (2/5)	Martin (1/3)	Martin (2/3)	Sampras (7/12)	Chang (4/5)	Philippoussis (1/2)	Haas (1/4)
Rotterdam	ATP World Series									Kafelnikov (4/4)
Milan/London (Note: Milan event leased and held in London in 1998–2000)	ATP World Series			Becker (6/9)	Becker (7/9)	Kafelnikov (1/4)	Ivanišević (5/7)	Ivanišević (6/7)	Kafelnikov (3/4)	Krajicek (5/5)
Philadelphia	Sampras (1/12)	Lendl (4/6)	Sampras (3/12)	Woodforde (1/1)	Chang (1/5)	Enqvist (1/2)	Courier (5/5)	Sampras (10/12)	Sampras (11/12)	Not an event
Stuttgart Indoor	Becker (2/9)	Edberg (2/8)	Ivanišević (2/7)	Stich (2/3)	Edberg (7/8)	Krajicek (3/5)	ATP Super 9			
Tokyo Outdoor	Edberg (1/8)	Edberg (3/8)	Courier (1/5)	Sampras (5/12)	Sampras (6/12)	Courier (4/5)	Sampras (8/12)	Krajicek (4/5)	Pavel (1/1)	Kiefer (1/1)
Barcelona	Gómez (1/1)	E. Sánchez (1/1)	C. Costa (1/1)	A. Medvedev (2/3)	Krajicek (1/5)	Muster (1/4)	Muster (3/4)	A. Costa (1/2)	Martin (3/3)	Mantilla (1/1)
Stuttgart Outdoor	Ivanišević (1/7)	Stich (1/3)	A. Medvedev (1/3)	Gustafsson (1/2)	Berasategui (1/1)	Muster (2/4)	Muster (4/4)	Corretja (1/5)	Kuerten (1/4)	Norman (1/1)
Kitzbühel	ATP World Series									A. Costa (2/2)
Washington, D.C.	Agassi (1/6)	Agassi (2/6)	Korda (2/2)	Mansdorf (1/1)	Edberg (8/8)	Agassi (3/6)	Chang (3/5)	Chang (5/5)	Agassi (5/6)	Agassi (6/6)
Indianapolis	Becker (3/9)	Sampras (2/12)	Sampras (4/12)	Courier (3/5)	Ferreira (1/1)	Enqvist (2/2)	Sampras (9/12)	Björkman (1/1)	Corretja (2/5)	Lapentti (1/2)
New Haven	Rostagno (1/1)	Korda (1/2)	Edberg (6/8)	A. Medvedev (3/3)	Becker (8/9)	Agassi (4/6)	O'Brien (1/1)	Kafelnikov (2/4)	Kučera (1/1)	Not an event
Sydney Indoor	Becker (4/9)	Edberg (4/8)	Ivanišević (3/7)	Yzaga (1/1)	Krajicek (2/5)	Not an event				
Tokyo Indoor	Lendl (2/6)	Edberg (5/8)	Lendl (5/6)	Lendl (6/6)	Ivanišević (4/7)	Chang (2/5)	Not an event			
Singapore	ATP World Series			Not an event			ATP World Series	Gustafsson (2/2)	Ríos (1/2)	Ríos (2/2)
Vienna	ATP World Series						Becker (9/9)	Ivanišević (7/7)	Sampras (12/12)	Rusedski (2/3)

=== ATP International Series Gold ===
Tournament	2000	2001	2002	2003	2004	2005	2006	2007	2008
Rotterdam	Pioline (1/1)	Escudé (1/2)	Escudé (2/2)	Mirnyi (1/1)	Hewitt (2/2)	Federer (5/24)	Štěpánek (1/2)	Youzhny (1/2)	Llodra (1/1)
Memphis	Larsson (1/1)	Philippoussis (2/2)	Roddick (2/5)	Dent (1/1)	J. Johansson (1/1)	Carlsen (2/2)	Haas (3/4)	Haas (4/4)	Darcis (1/1)
London	Rosset (2/2)	ATP International Series (Milan)					Not an event		
Dubai	ATP International Series	Ferrero (1/2)	Santoro (1/1)	Federer (2/24)	Federer (4/24)	Federer (6/24)	Nadal (4/23)	Federer (8/24)	Roddick (3/5)
Mexico City/Acapulco	Chela (1/2)	Kuerten (3/4)	Moyá (1/3)	Calleri (1/2)	Moyá (3/3)	Nadal (1/23)	Horna	Chela (2/2)	Almagro (1/2)
Barcelona	Safin (1/1)	Ferrero (2/2)	Gaudio (1/2)	Moyá (2/3)	Robredo (1/1)	Nadal (2/23)	Nadal (5/23)	Nadal (6/23)	Nadal (8/23)
Stuttgart	Squillari (1/1)	Kuerten (4/4)	ATP International Series	Coria (1/2)	Cañas (1/1)	Nadal (3/23)	Ferrer (1/10)	Nadal (7/23)	del Potro (1/9)
Kitzbühel	Corretja (3/5)	Lapentti (2/2)	Corretja (5/5)	Coria (2/2)	Massú (1/1)	Gaudio (2/2)	Calleri (2/2)	Mónaco (1/2)	del Potro (2/9)
Washington, D.C.	Corretja (4/2)	Roddick (1/5)	Blake (1/1)	ATP International Series					
Indianapolis	Kuerten (2/4)	Rafter (1/1)	Rusedski (3/3)	ATP International Series					
Tokyo	Schalken (1/1)	Hewitt (1/2)	Carlsen (1/2)	Schüttler (1/1)	Novák (1/1)	Moodie (1/1)	Federer (7/24)	Ferrer (2/10)	Berdych (1/3)
Vienna	Henman (1/1)	Haas (2/4)	Federer (1/24)	Federer (3/24)	López (1/3)	Ljubičić (1/2)	Ljubičić (2/2)	Djokovic (1/15)	Petzschner (1/1)

== Doubles champions ==
=== ATP Championship Series ===
Tournament	1990	1991	1992	1993	1994	1995	1996	1997	1998	1999
Brussels	E. Sánchez (1/3); Živojinović (1/1)	Woodbridge (1/12); Woodforde (1/11)	Becker (1/2); J. McEnroe (1/1)	Not an event						
Antwerp	Invitational		ATP World Series			Not an event	Björkman (1/2); Kulti (1/2)	Adams (2/5); Delaître (2/3)	W. Ferreira (1/1); Kafelnikov (3/6)	Not an event
Toronto Indoor	Galbraith (1/8); Macpherson (1/3)	Not an event								
Memphis	ATP World Series	Riglewski (1/1); Stich (1/1)	Woodbridge (3/12); Woodforde (2/11)	Woodbridge (6/12); Woodforde (5/11)	Black (2/3); Stark (2/4)	Palmer (2/6); Reneberg (6/7)	Knowles (3/15); Nestor (2/20)	E. Ferreira (1/2); Galbraith (7/8)	Woodbridge (10/12); Woodforde (9/11)	Woodbridge (12/12); Woodforde (11/11)
Rotterdam	ATP World Series									Adams (3/5) de Jager (1/3)
Milan/London	ATP World Series			Kratzmann (2/3); Masur (4/5)	Nijssen (3/3); Suk (4/7)	Becker (2/2); Forget (3/3)	Gaudenzi (1/1); Ivanišević (1/1)	Albano (1/2); Nyborg (1/2)	Damm (2/9); Grabb (7/7)	Henman (1/1); Rusedski (1/1)
Philadelphia	Leach (1/8); Pugh (1/2)	Leach (2/8); Pugh (2/2)	Woodbridge (4/12); Woodforde (3/11)	Grabb (4/7); Reneberg (4/7)	Eltingh (1/5); Haarhuis (1/7)	Grabb (5/7); Stark (3/4)	Woodbridge (8/12); Woodforde (7/11)	Lareau (1/4); O'Brien (1/2)	Eltingh (4/5); Haarhuis (4/7)	Not an event
Stuttgart Indoor	Forget (1/3); Hlasek (1/2)	Casal (1/1); E. Sánchez (2/3)	Nijssen (1/3); Suk (1/7)	Kratzmann (3/3); Masur (5/5)	Adams (1/5); Olhovskiy (1/1)	Connell (6/8); Galbraith (6/8)	ATP Super 9			
Tokyo Outdoor	Kratzmann (1/3); Masur (1/5)	Edberg; Woodbridge (2/12)	Jones (1/2); Leach (3/8)	Flach (2/2); Leach (5/8)	Holm (1/1); Järryd (1/1)	Knowles (1/15); Stark (4/4)	Woodbridge (9/12); Woodforde (8/11)	Damm (1/9); Vacek (3/6)	Lareau (2/4); Nestor (3/20)	Tarango (2/2); Vacek (5/6)
Barcelona	Gómez (1/2); J. Sánchez (1/3)	de la Peña (1/1); Nargiso (1/1)	Gómez (2/2); J. Sánchez (2/3)	Cannon (1/1); Melville (2/4)	Kafelnikov (1/6); Rikl (1/4)	Kronemann (1/1); Macpherson (2/3)	Lobo (1/2); J. Sánchez (3/3)	Berasategui (1/1); Burillo (1/1)	Eltingh (5/5); Haarhuis (5/7)	Haarhuis (6/7); Kafelnikov (5/6)
Stuttgart Outdoor	Aldrich (1/1); Visser (1/1)	Masur (2/5); E. Sánchez (3/3)	Layendecker (1/1); Talbot (1/2)	Nijssen (2/3); Suk (2/7)	Melville (3/4); Norval (1/1)	Carbonell (1/1); Roig (1/1)	Pimek (1/1); Talbot (2/2)	Kuerten (1/2); Meligeni (1/1)	Delaître (3/3); Santoro (1/3)	Oncins (1/1); Orsanic (1/1)
Kitzbühel	ATP World Series									Haggard (1/3); Nyborg (2/2)
Washington, D.C.	Connell (1/8); Michibata (1/1)	Davis (2/4); Pate (2/2)	Garnett (1/1); Palmer (1/6)	Black (1/3); Leach (6/8)	Connell (3/8); Galbraith (3/8)	Delaître (1/3); Tarango (1/2)	Connell (7/8); Davis (4/4)	L. Jensen (1/1); M. Jensen (1/1)	Stafford (1/1); Ullyett (1/4)	Gimelstob (1/3); Lareau (3/4)
Indianapolis	Davis (1/4); Pate (1/2)	Flach (1/1); Seguso (1/1)	Grabb (3/7); Reneberg (3/7)	Davis (3/4); Martin (1/1)	Woodbridge (7/12); Woodforde (6/11)	Knowles (2/15); Nestor (1/20)	Grabb (6/7); Reneberg (7/7)	Tillström (1/2); Tebbutt (1/1)	Novák (1/3); Rikl (2/4)	Haarhuis (7/7); Palmer (3/6)
New Haven	Brown (1/1); Melville (1/4)	Korda (1/1); Masur (3/5)	Jones (2/2); Leach (4/8)	Suk (3/7); Vacek (1/6)	Connell (4/8); Galbraith (4/8)	Leach (7/8); Melville (4/4)	Black (3/3); Connell (8/8)	Bhupathi (1/8); Paes (1/6)	Arthurs (1/2); Tramacchi (1/1)	Not an event
Sydney Indoor	Dyke (1/1); Lundgren (1/1)	Grabb (1/7); Reneberg (1/7)	P. McEnroe (1/2); Stark (1/4)	P. McEnroe (2/2); Reneberg (5/7)	Eltingh (2/5); Haarhuis (2/7)	Not an event				
Tokyo Indoor	Forget (2/3); Hlasek (1/2)	Grabb (2/7); Reneberg (2/7)	Woodbridge (5/12); Woodforde (4/11)	Connell (2/8); Galbraith (2/8)	Connell (5/8); Galbraith (5/8)	Eltingh (3/5); Haarhuis (3/7)	Not an event			
Singapore	ATP World Series			Not an event			ATP World Series	Bhupathi (2/8); Paes (2/6)	Woodbridge (11/12); Woodforde (10/11)	Mirnyi (1/7); Taino (1/1)
Vienna	ATP World Series						Kafelnikov (2/6); Vacek (2/6)	E. Ferreira (1/2); Galbraith (8/8)	Kafelnikov (4/6); Vacek (4/6)	Prinosil (1/2); Stolle (1/4)

=== International Series Gold ===
Tournament	2000	2001	2002	2003	2004	2005	2006	2007	2008
Rotterdam	Adams (4/5) de Jager (2/3)	Björkman (2/2); Federer (1/3)	Federer (2/3); Mirnyi (2/7)	Arthurs (2/2); Hanley (1/6)	Hanley (2/6); Štěpánek (2/4)	Erlich (1/1); Ram (1/2)	Hanley (3/6); Ullyett (3/4)	Paes (6/6); Damm (8/9)	Berdych (1/1); Tursunov (1/2)
Memphis	Gimelstob (2/3); Lareau (4/4)	B. Bryan (1/14); M. Bryan (1/14)	MacPhie (2/2); Zimonjić (2/17)	Knowles (7/15); Nestor (6/20)	B. Bryan (4/14); M. Bryan (4/14)	Aspelin (1/3); Perry (1/1)	Haggard (3/3); Karlović (1/1)	Butorac (1/2); J. Murray (1/9)	Bhupathi (5/8); Knowles (12/15)
London	Adams (5/5) de Jager (3/3)	ATP International Series (Milan)					Not an event		
Dubai	ATP International Series	Eagle (1/2); Stolle (3/4)	Knowles (5/15); Nestor (4/20)	Paes (4/6); Rikl (4/4)	Bhupathi (4/8); Santoro (2/3)	Damm (7/9); Štěpánek (4/4)	Hanley (4/6); Ullyett (4/4)	Santoro (3/3); Zimonjić (4/17)	Bhupathi (6/8); Knowles (13/15)
Mexico City/Acapulco	B. Black (4/4); Johnson (1/3)	Johnson (2/3); Kuerten (2/2)	B. Bryan (2/14); M. Bryan (2/14)	Knowles (8/15); Nestor (7/20)	B. Bryan (5/14); M. Bryan (5/14)	Ferrer (1/1); Ventura (1/1)	Čermák (2/5); Friedl (3/4)	Starace (1/2); Vassallo Argüello (1/1)	Marach (1/4); Mertiňák (1/3)
Barcelona	Kulti (2/2); Tillström (2/2)	Johnson (3/3); Palmer (5/6)	Hill (1/1); Vacek (6/6)	B. Bryan (3/14); M. Bryan (3/14)	Knowles (9/15); Nestor (8/20)	Paes (5/6); Zimonjić (3/17)	Knowles (11/15); Nestor (10/20)	Pavel (2/2); Waske (1/1)	B. Bryan (6/14); M. Bryan (6/14)
Stuttgart	Novák (2/3); Rikl (3/4)	Cañas (1/1); Schüttler (1/1)	ATP International Series	Cibulec (1/1); Vízner (1/3)	Novák (3/3); Štěpánek (3/4)	Acasuso (1/1); Prieto (1/1)	Gaudio (1/1); Mirnyi (3/7)	Čermák (3/5); Friedl (4/4)	Kas (1/1); Kohlschreiber (2/2)
Kitzbühel	Albano (2/2); Suk (5/7)	Corretja (1/1); Lobo (2/2)	Koenig (1/1); Shimada (1/1)	Damm (5/9); Suk (6/7)	Čermák (1/5); Friedl (1/4)	Friedl (2/4); Pavel (1/2)	Koubek (1/1); Kohlschreiber (1/2)	Horna (1/1); Starace (2/2)	Cerretani (1/1); Hănescu (1/2)
Washington, D.C.	O'Brien (2/2); Palmer (4/6)	Damm (3/9); Prinosil (2/2)	W. Black (1/1); Ullyett (2/4)	ATP International Series					
Indianapolis	Hewitt (1/1); Stolle (2/4)	Knowles (4/15); MacPhie (1/2)	Knowles (6/15); Nestor (5/20)	ATP International Series					
Tokyo	Bhupathi (3/8); Paes (3/6)	Leach (8/8); Macpherson (3/3)	Coetzee (1/1); Haggard (2/3)	Gimelstob (3/3); Kiefer (1/1)	Palmer (6/6); Vízner (2/3)	Iwabuchi (1/1); Suzuki (1/1)	Fisher (1/1); Phillips (1/1)	Kerr (1/1); Lindstedt (1/3)	Youzhny (1/2); Zverev (1/2)
Vienna	Kafelnikov (6/6); Zimonjić (1/17)	Damm (4/9); Štěpánek (1/4)	Eagle (2/2); Stolle (4/4)	Allegro (1/1); Federer (3/3)	Damm (6/9); Suk (7/7)	Knowles (10/15); Nestor (9/20)	Pála (1/1); Vízner (3/3)	Fyrstenberg (1/3); Matkowski (1/4)	Mirnyi (4/7); Ram (2/2)

== Titles champions 2000 to 2008 ==
Players with 3 or more titles

#	Player	RO	ME	DU	AC	BA	ST	KI	TO	VI	EX	#	Winning span
1	Roger Federer	1	-	4	-	-	-	-	1	2	-	8	2002–07 (6)
1	Rafael Nadal	-	-	1	1	4	2	-	-	-	-	8	2005–08 (4)
3	Àlex Corretja	-	-	-	-	-	-	2	-	-	1	3	2000–02 (3)
3	Tommy Haas	-	2	-	-	-	-	-	-	1	-	3	2001–07 (7)
3	Gustavo Kuerten	-	-	-	1	-	1	-	-	-	1	3	2000–01 (2)
3	Carlos Moyá	-	-	-	2	1	-	-	-	-	-	3	2002–04 (3)
3	Andy Roddick	-	1	1	-	-	-	-	-	-	1	3	2001–08 (8)

RO = Rotterdam, ME = Memphis, DU = Dubai, AC = Acapulco (Mexico City), BA = Barcelona, ST = Stuttgart, KI = Kitzbühel, TO = Tokyo, PA = Paris, EX = Extinct tournaments.

The 4th International Series Gold tournament was played in Mexico City in 2000, before moving to its current location in Acapulco in 2001.

The "Extinct tournaments" are: Indianapolis, Washington, London.

3 or more titles per tournament underlined.

== Titles champions 1990 to 1999 ==
Players with 3 or more titles

	Titles	#
1.	Pete Sampras	12
2.	Boris Becker	9
3.	Stefan Edberg	8
4.	/ Goran Ivanišević	7
5.	Andre Agassi	6
5.	/ Ivan Lendl	6
7.	Michael Chang	5
7.	Jim Courier	5
7.	Richard Krajicek	5
10.	Yevgeny Kafelnikov	4
10.	Thomas Muster	4
12.	Todd Martin	3
12.	Andriy Medvedev	3
12.	Marcelo Ríos	3
12.	Michael Stich	3

== Note ==
- Prior to the formation of the ATP in 1990 three of these tournaments Philadelphia, Indianapolis, and Tokyo were part of the Grand Prix Super Series major ranking tournaments. The precursor to Masters 1000 Series Events.

== See also ==
- ATP International Series
- List of tennis tournaments
