= Derrick Rostagno =

American tennis player

- Country (sports): United States
- Residence: Pacific Palisades, California. United States
- Born: October 25, 1965 (age 60) Hollywood, California, United States
- Height: 6 ft 1 in (1.85 m)
- Turned pro: 1986
- Retired: 1997
- Plays: Right-handed (two-handed backhand)
- Prize money: $1,621,535

Singles
- Career record: 191–183
- Career titles: 1
- Highest ranking: No. 13 (11 November 1991)

Grand Slam singles results
- Australian Open: 4R (1987)
- French Open: 3R (1993)
- Wimbledon: 4R (1991)
- US Open: QF (1988)

Other tournaments
- Olympic Games: 1R (1984)

Doubles
- Career record: 34–53
- Career titles: 1
- Highest ranking: No. 142 (2 October 1989)

Grand Slam doubles results
- Australian Open: 2R (1991)
- French Open: 1R (1989, 1990, 1991)
- Wimbledon: Q1 (1984)
- US Open: 1R (1989)
- Last updated on: 1 June 2022.

Derrick John Rostagno (born October 25, 1965) is an American former professional tennis player.

== Career ==
Rostagno's grandfather, Juan Rostagno, was a shooter for Argentina at the 1936 and 1948 Summer Olympics.

Initially attending Stanford University, Rostagno was on the American tennis team at the 1984 Summer Olympics, in his freshman year. He had been injured in a bicycle accident earlier that year that nearly prevented him from trying out for the Olympics. Rostagno dropped out in his sophomore year to focus on his tennis career; by late 1986, he was ranked No. 66.

After winning a tournament in Mexico in March 1986, Rostagno purchased a ticket home that included Mexicana de Aviación Flight 940 as a continuing flight. He chose not to take Flight 940 to play an event in Mexico City; the flight would subsequently crash into a mountain in the Sierra Madre Occidental range, killing all 167 occupants on board.

Rostagno won one top-level singles title (at New Haven in 1990) and one tour doubles title (at Tampa in 1993).

Rostagno's best performance at a Grand Slam event came at the 1988 US Open, where he reached the quarterfinals by beating Yahiya Doumbia, Martin Davis, Tim Mayotte and Ronald Agénor before being defeated by Ivan Lendl. At several other Grand Slam events, he defeated or almost defeated several tennis hall of famers. At Wimbledon in 1988, Rostagno lost a five-set third round match to Jimmy Connors, who at the time was ranked World No. 5. At the 1989 US Open, Rostagno had two straight match points in his second round encounter with Boris Becker, who won the second of those on a lucky net cord passing shot and eventually the match 1–6, 6–7, 6–3, 7–6, 6–3, en route to his lone US Open title. At Wimbledon in 1990, Rostagno defeated John McEnroe in straight sets in the first round. At Wimbledon in 1991, Rostagno defeated ninth ranked Pete Sampras in four sets in the second round and Connors in straight sets in the third round.

Rostagno finished his career with a 3–2 win–loss record versus McEnroe, winning their last three matches, and a 2–3 record versus Connors, winning their last two matches. Against other top players, Rostagno was 2–1 versus Sampras, 1–0 versus Yannick Noah, 1–1 versus Mats Wilander, 2–3 versus Lendl, 1–2 versus Becker, 3–6 versus Jim Courier, 0–1 versus Michael Chang, 0–1 versus Todd Martin, 0–2 versus Andre Agassi, and 0–4 versus Stefan Edberg.

Rostagno's career-high singles ranking was World No. 13, which he reached in 1991. His career prize-money earnings totaled US$1,621,535. He retired from the professional tour in 1996.

After retiring from the tour, Rostagno completed his undergraduate studies at Stanford University, obtained his MBA from UCLA and his Juris Doctor degree from Loyola University. He is now a practicing lawyer in Los Angeles, California, actively engaged in civil litigation in the firm that bears his name.

== ATP career finals ==
=== Singles: 3 (1 title, 2 runner-ups) ===
Legend Grand Slam tournaments (0–0) ATP World Tour Finals (0–0) ATP World Tour Masters Series (0–0) ATP World Tour Championship Series (1–1) ATP World Tour World Series (0–1)	Titles by surface Hard (1–1) Clay (0–0) Grass (0–0) Carpet (0–1)	Titles by setting Outdoor (1–1) Indoor (0–1)

Result	W–L	Date	Tournament	Tier	Surface	Opponent	Score
Win	1–0	Aug 1990	New Haven, United States	Championship Series	Hard	(Australia) Todd Woodbridge	6–3, 6–3
Loss	1–1	Apr 1991	Orlando, United States	World Series	Hard	(United States) Andre Agassi	2–6, 6–1, 3–6
Loss	1–2	Oct 1991	Tokyo, Japan	Championship Series	Carpet	(Sweden) Stefan Edberg	3–6, 6–1, 2–6

=== Doubles: 1 (1 title) ===
Legend Grand Slam tournaments (0–0) ATP World Tour Finals (0–0) ATP World Tour Masters Series (0–0) ATP World Tour Championship Series (0–0) ATP World Tour World Series (1–0)	Titles by surface Hard (0–0) Clay (1–0) Grass (0–0) Carpet (0–0)	Titles by setting Outdoor (1–0) Indoor (0–0)

Result	W–L	Date	Tournament	Tier	Surface	Partner	Opponents	Score
Win	1–0	May 1993	Tampa, United States	World Series	Clay	(United States) Todd Martin	(United States) Kelly Jones (United States) Jared Palmer	6–3, 6–4

== ATP Challenger and ITF Futures finals ==
=== Singles: 1 (0–1) ===
Legend ATP Challenger (0–1) ITF Futures (0–0)	Finals by surface Hard (0–1) Clay (0–0) Grass (0–0) Carpet (0–0)

Result	W–L	Date	Tournament	Tier	Surface	Opponent	Score
Loss	0–1	Oct 1995	Glendale, United States	Challenger	Hard	(The Bahamas) Mark Knowles	4–6, 6–7

== Performance timelines ==
Key
W	F	SF	QF	#R	RR	Q#	DNQ	A	NH

(W) winner; (F) finalist; (SF) semifinalist; (QF) quarterfinalist; (#R) rounds 4, 3, 2, 1; (RR) round-robin stage; (Q#) qualification round; (DNQ) did not qualify; (A) absent; (NH) not held; (SR) strike rate (events won / competed); (W–L) win–loss record.

=== Singles ===
Tournament	1983	1984	1985	1986	1987	1988	1989	1990	1991	1992	1993	1994	1995	1996	SR	W–L	Win %
Grand Slam tournaments
Australian Open	A	A	A	A	4R	2R	A	A	1R	2R	A	A	A	1R	0 / 5	5–5	50%
French Open	A	A	A	A	1R	A	2R	1R	1R	2R	3R	A	1R	A	0 / 7	4–7	36%
Wimbledon	Q1	Q2	Q1	A	2R	3R	2R	3R	4R	3R	3R	A	3R	2R	0 / 9	16–9	64%
US Open	A	A	1R	1R	1R	QF	2R	2R	4R	1R	1R	A	2R	A	0 / 10	10–10	50%
Win–loss	0–0	0–0	0–1	0–1	4–4	7–3	3–3	3–3	6–4	4–4	4–3	0–0	3–3	1–2	0 / 31	35–31	53%
Year-end Championships
Summer Olympics	NH	1R	Not Held			A	Not Held			A	Not Held			A	0 / 1	0–1	0%
ATP Masters Series
Indian Wells	A	A	A	A	A	2R	1R	A	3R	3R	1R	A	Q1	A	0 / 5	5–5	50%
Miami	A	A	A	A	QF	A	1R	1R	QF	3R	1R	A	2R	1R	0 / 8	9–8	53%
Rome	A	A	A	A	1R	A	A	A	A	A	A	A	A	A	0 / 1	0–1	0%
Canada	A	A	A	A	2R	3R	A	3R	QF	2R	1R	A	A	A	0 / 6	8–6	57%
Cincinnati	A	A	A	1R	3R	A	1R	A	QF	2R	1R	A	A	A	0 / 6	6–6	50%
Paris	A	A	A	1R	A	2R	A	A	3R	3R	A	A	A	A	0 / 4	4–4	50%
Win–loss	0–0	0–0	0–0	0–2	7–4	3–3	0–3	2–2	12–5	7–5	0–4	0–0	1–1	0–1	0 / 30	32–30	52%
