= Tokyo Indoor =

Defunct tennis tournament
- Event name: Varied
- Tour: Grand Prix circuit (1978-1989); ATP Tour (1990-1995)
- Founded: 1966
- Abolished: 1995
- Editions: 23
- Location: Tokyo, Japan
- Venue: Tokyo Municipal Gym; Yoyogi National Stadium
- Surface: Carpet

The Tokyo Indoor was a men's tennis tournament played in Tokyo, Japan on indoor carpet courts from 1966 to 1995.

== History ==
The event was established in 1966 but had periods when it was not staged. It was played as part of the Grand Prix Tennis Tour from 1978 to 1989 and part of the Grand Prix Super Series, the precursors to the Masters 1000, from 1978 to 1988. It became part of the ATP Championship Series between 1990 and 1995. The tournament was held at the Tokyo Municipal Gym in 1978 and 1979, then the Yoyogi National Gymnasium, before returning to the former for the 1990s. It was played on indoor carpet courts. The tournament was known for offering more prize money than most others.

== Sponsorship names ==
The tournament was also known by its sponsorship names such as the Seiko World Super Tennis and Seiko Super Tennis.

== Past finals ==
=== Singles ===
Year	Tournament name	Champions	Runners-up	Score
1966	Tokyo Indoor	(Japan) Ishiguru Osama	(Japan) Keishioro Yanagi	4–6, 6–4, 6–0
1967-68	Not held			
1969	Tokyo Indoor	(Australia) John Bartlett	(Japan) Ichizo Konishi	6–3, 6–3
1970	Tokyo Indoor	(Japan) Tashiro Sakai	(Australia) Ian Fletcher	6–2, 6–3
1971	Tokyo Indoor	(Australia) Ian Fletcher	(Japan) Takeshi Koura	7–5, 6–4
1972-77	Not held			
1978	Seiko World Super Tennis	(Sweden) Björn Borg	(United States) Brian Teacher	6–3, 6–4
1979	Seiko World Super Tennis	(Sweden) Björn Borg	(United States) Jimmy Connors	6–2, 6–2
1980	Seiko World Super Tennis	(United States) Jimmy Connors	(United States) Tom Gullikson	6–1, 6–2
1981	Seiko World Super Tennis	(United States) Vincent Van Patten	(Australia) Mark Edmondson	6–2, 3–6, 6–3
1982	Seiko World Super Tennis	(United States) John McEnroe	(Australia) Peter McNamara	7–6, 7–5
1983	Seiko World Super Tennis	(Czech Republic) Ivan Lendl	(United States) Scott Davis	3–6, 6–3, 6–4
1984	Seiko Super Tennis	(United States) Jimmy Connors	(Czech Republic) Ivan Lendl	6–4, 3–6, 6–0
1985	Seiko Super Tennis	(Czech Republic) Ivan Lendl	(Sweden) Mats Wilander	6–0, 6–4
1986	Seiko Super Tennis	(Germany) Boris Becker	(Sweden) Stefan Edberg	7–6, 6–1
1987	Seiko Super Tennis	(Sweden) Stefan Edberg	(Czech Republic) Ivan Lendl	6–7, 6–4, 6–4
1988	Seiko Super Tennis	(Germany) Boris Becker	(Australia) John Fitzgerald	7–6, 6–4
1989	Seiko Super Tennis	(United States) Aaron Krickstein	(Germany) Carl-Uwe Steeb	6–2, 6–2
1990	Seiko Super Tennis	(Czech Republic) Ivan Lendl	(Germany) Boris Becker	4–6, 6–3, 7–6
1991	Seiko Super Tennis	(Sweden) Stefan Edberg	(United States) Derrick Rostagno	6–3, 1–6, 6–2
1992	Seiko Super Tennis	(United States) Ivan Lendl	(Sweden) Henrik Holm	7–6, 6–4
1993	Seiko Super Tennis	(United States) Ivan Lendl	(United States) Todd Martin	6–4, 6–4
1994	Seiko Super Tennis	(Croatia) Goran Ivanišević	(United States) Michael Chang	6–4, 6–4
1995	Seiko Super Tennis	(United States) Michael Chang	(Australia) Mark Philippoussis	6–3, 6–4
1996	license sold to Singapore Open			

=== Doubles ===
Year	Champions	Runners-up	Score
1978	(Australia) Ross Case (Australia) Geoff Masters	(United States) Pat Du Pré (United States) Tom Gorman	6–3, 6–4
1979	(United States) Marty Riessen (United States) Sherwood Stewart	(United States) Mike Cahill (United States) Terry Moor	6–4, 7–6
1980	(United States) Victor Amaya (United States) Hank Pfister	(United States) Marty Riessen (United States) Sherwood Stewart	6–3, 3–6, 7–6
1981	(United States) Victor Amaya (United States) Hank Pfister	(Switzerland) Heinz Günthardt (Hungary) Balázs Taróczy	6–4, 6–2
1982	(United States) Tim Gullikson (United States) Tom Gullikson	(United States) John McEnroe (United States) Peter Rennert	6–4, 3–6, 7–6
1983	(Australia) Mark Edmondson (United States) Sherwood Stewart	(United States) Steve Denton (Australia) John Fitzgerald	6–1, 6–4
1984	(United States) Sammy Giammalva Jr. (United States) Tony Giammalva	(Australia) Mark Edmondson (United States) Sherwood Stewart	7–6, 6–4
1985	(United States) Ken Flach (United States) Robert Seguso	(United States) Scott Davis (United States) David Pate	4–6, 6–3, 7–6
1986	(United States) Mike De Palmer (United States) Gary Donnelly	(Ecuador) Andrés Gómez (Czech Republic) Ivan Lendl	6–3, 7–5
1987	(Australia) Broderick Dyke (Netherlands) Tom Nijssen	(United States) Sammy Giammalva Jr. (United States) Jim Grabb	6–3, 6–2
1988	(Ecuador) Andrés Gómez (Socialist Federal Republic of Yugoslavia) Slobodan Živojinović	(Germany) Boris Becker (Germany) Eric Jelen	7–5, 5–7, 6–3
1989	(United States) Kevin Curren (United States) David Pate	(Ecuador) Andrés Gómez (Socialist Federal Republic of Yugoslavia) Slobodan Živojinović	4–6, 6–3, 7–6
1990	(France) Guy Forget (Switzerland) Jakob Hlasek	(United States) Scott Davis (United States) David Pate	7–6, 7–5
1991	(United States) Jim Grabb (United States) Richey Reneberg	(United States) Scott Davis (United States) David Pate	7–5, 2–6, 7–6
1992	(Australia) Todd Woodbridge (Australia) Mark Woodforde	(United States) Jim Grabb (United States) Richey Reneberg	7–6, 6–4
1993	(Canada) Grant Connell (United States) Patrick Galbraith	(United States) Luke Jensen (United States) Murphy Jensen	6–3, 6–4
1994	(Canada) Grant Connell (United States) Patrick Galbraith	(Zimbabwe) Byron Black (United States) Jonathan Stark	6–3, 3–6, 6–4
1995	(Netherlands) Jacco Eltingh (Netherlands) Paul Haarhuis	(Switzerland) Jakob Hlasek (United States) Patrick McEnroe	7–6, 6–4

== Records ==
=== Singles ===
Included:

- Most titles: (Czech Republic) / (United States) Ivan Lendl (5)
- Most finals: (Czech Republic) / (United States) Ivan Lendl (7)
- Most consecutive titles: (United States) Ivan Lendl, (Sweden) Björn Borg (2)
- Most consecutive finals: (Czech Republic) Ivan Lendl (3) (1983–85)
- Most matches played: (Czech Republic) / (United States) Ivan Lendl (48)
- Most matches won: (Czech Republic) / (United States) Ivan Lendl (42)
- Most consecutive matches won: (Sweden) Björn Borg (12)
- Most editions played: (Czech Republic) / (United States) Ivan Lendl (11)
- Best match winning %: (Czech Republic) / (United States) Ivan Lendl, 87.5%
- Oldest champion: (Czech Republic) / (United States) , Ivan Lendl, 33y 7m & 4d (1993)
- Youngest champion: (Germany) Boris Becker, 18y 10m & 30d (1986)
- Longest final: (Sweden) Stefan Edberg v (Czech Republic) / (United States) Ivan Lendl result: 6–7, 6–4, 6–4, (33 games), in (1987)
- Shortest final: (United States) Jimmy Connors v (United States) Tom Gullikson result: 6-1 6-2, (15 games), in (1980)

=== Doubles ===
- Most titles (same partner): (Canada) Grant Connell and (United States) Patrick Galbraith: (2)
- Most tiles (different partner): (United States) Sherwood Stewart: (2)
