= 1982 Seiko Super Tennis – Singles =

Singles
- 1982 Tokyo Indoor

Final
- Champion: (United States) John McEnroe
- Runner-up: (Australia) Peter McNamara
- Score: 7–6^{(8–6)}, 7–5

Details
- Draw: 32
- Seeds: 8

Events
Singles	Doubles
← 1981 ·	Tokyo Indoor	· 1983 →

The 1982 Seiko Super Tennis – Singles was a tennis event of the 1982 Tokyo Indoor tournament. The draw for the event consisted of 32 players. Vincent Van Patten was the defending champion, but lost in the second round in 1982. First-seeded John McEnroe won the tournament, beating Peter McNamara in the final, 7–6^{(8–6)}, 7–5.

== Seeds ==
1. (United States) John McEnroe (champion)
2. (United States) Vitas Gerulaitis (semifinals)
3. (France) Yannick Noah (first round)
4. (Australia) Peter McNamara (final)
5. (United States) Johan Kriek (first round, retired)
6. (United States) Steve Denton (quarterfinals)
7. (Australia) Mark Edmondson (semifinals)
8. (United States) Brian Teacher (quarterfinals)

== Draw ==
=== Key ===
- Q = Qualifier
- WC = Wild card
- LL = Lucky loser
- Alt = Alternate
- SE = Special exempt
- PR = Protected ranking
- ITF = ITF entry
- JE = Junior exempt
- w/o = Walkover
- r = Retired
- d = Defaulted
- SR = Special ranking

=== Finals ===
Semifinals
1	(United States) John McEnroe	6	6
7	(Australia) Mark Edmondson	3	2
4	(Australia) Peter McNamara	6	3	6
2	(United States) Vitas Gerulaitis	3	6	2

Final
1	(United States) John McEnroe	7	7
4	(Australia) Peter McNamara	6	5

=== Top half ===
First round
1	(United States) J McEnroe	6	6
Q	(United States) C Strode	0	3
(Japan) T Fukui	1	6
(Australia) P Dent	6	7
(United States) T Mayotte	7	7
(United States) To Gullikson	6	5
(United States) J Sadri	1	6
6	(United States) S Denton	6	7
3	(France) Y Noah	6	6
(United States) P Du Pré	7	7
(United States) H Pfister	6	6
(United States) T Wilkison	4	4
Q	(Paraguay) F González	6	1	4
(United States) J Arias	3	6	6
(United States) Ti Gullikson	6	4
7	(Australia) M Edmondson	7	6

Second round
1	(United States) J McEnroe	6	7
(Australia) P Dent	1	5
(United States) T Mayotte	2	7	3
6	(United States) S Denton	6	6	6
(United States) P Du Pré	6	6
(United States) H Pfister	2	4
(United States) J Arias	7	5	6
7	(Australia) M Edmondson	6	7	7

Quarterfinals
1	(United States) J McEnroe	7	7
6	(United States) S Denton	6	5
(United States) P Du Pré	3	5
7	(Australia) M Edmondson	6	7

Semifinals
1	(United States) J McEnroe	6	6
7	(Australia) M Edmondson	3	2

=== Bottom half ===
First round
8	(United States) B Teacher	6	6	6
(Canada) G Michibata	2	7	4
(United States) V Winitsky	6	7
(West Germany) A Maurer	1	5
(United States) V Amaya	4	4
(United States) V Van Patten	6	6
(United States) C Hooper	2	4
4	(Australia) P McNamara	6	6
5	(United States) J Kriek	0^{r}
(France) D Bedel	3
(United States) R Van't Hof	4	7	6
(Australia) P McNamee	6	5	4
Q	(United States) M Leach	7	4	6
Q	(United States) B Gilbert	6	6	3
(Japan) S Nishio	2	2
2	(United States) V Gerulaitis	6	6

Second round
8	(United States) B Teacher	6	6
(United States) V Winitsky	2	3
(United States) V Van Patten	6	4
4	(Australia) P McNamara	7	6
(France) D Bedel	6	7	2
(United States) R Van't Hof	7	6	6
Q	(United States) M Leach	1	4
2	(United States) V Gerulaitis	6	6

Quarterfinals
8	(United States) B Teacher	3	6	4
4	(Australia) P McNamara	6	2	6
(United States) R Van't Hof	6	5
2	(United States) V Gerulaitis	7	7

Semifinals
4	(Australia) P McNamara	6	3	6
2	(United States) V Gerulaitis	3	6	2
