= 1982 Seiko Super Tennis – Doubles =

Doubles
- 1982 Tokyo Indoor

Final
- Champions: (United States) Tim Gullikson (United States) Tom Gullikson
- Runners-up: (United States) John McEnroe (United States) Peter Rennert
- Score: 6–4, 3–6, 7–6^{(7–3)}

Events
Singles	Doubles
← 1981 ·	Tokyo Indoor	· 1983 →

Victor Amaya and Hank Pfister were the defending champions.

Tim Gullikson and Tom Gullikson won the title, defeating John McEnroe and Peter Rennert 6–4, 3–6, 7–6^{(7–3)} in the final.

== Seeds ==
1. (United States) Steve Denton / (Australia) Mark Edmondson (semifinals)
2. N/A
3. (United States) Sherwood Stewart / (United States) Ferdi Taygan (quarterfinals)
4. (United States) Victor Amaya / (United States) Hank Pfister (quarterfinals)

== Draw ==
=== Key ===
- Q = Qualifier
- WC = Wild card
- LL = Lucky loser
- Alt = Alternate
- SE = Special exempt
- PR = Protected ranking
- ITF = ITF entry
- JE = Junior exempt
- w/o = Walkover
- r = Retired
- d = Defaulted
- SR = Special ranking

=== Draw ===
First round
1	(United States) S Denton (Australia) M Edmondson	6	6
(Australia) P Dent (Israel) S Krulevitz	2	3
(United States) A Andrews (United States) J Sadri	7^{7}	6
(United States) L Stefanki (United States) R Van't Hof	6^{5}	1
3	(United States) S Stewart (United States) F Taygan	7	7
(United States) T Mayotte (United States) T Wilkison	5	5
(Japan) K Hirai (Japan) S Sakamoto	0	2
(United States) J McEnroe (United States) P Rennert	6	6
(United States) S Meister (United States) C Wittus	1	3
(United States) Ti Gullikson (United States) To Gullikson	6	6
(Switzerland) H Günthardt (Hungary) Z Kuharszky	7^{7}	4	6^{6}
4	(United States) V Amaya (United States) H Pfister	6^{5}	6	7^{8}
(United States) CB Strode (United States) MS Strode	6	3	4
(Paraguay) F González (United States) V Winitsky	4	6	6
(United States) M Davis (United States) C Hooper	6	6^{4}	2
LL	(United States) M Brunnberg (United States) D Gitlin	3	7^{7}	6

Quarterfinals
1	(United States) S Denton (Australia) M Edmondson	7	6^{5}	6
(United States) A Andrews (United States) J Sadri	5	7^{7}	3
3	(United States) S Stewart (United States) F Taygan	5	4
(United States) J McEnroe (United States) P Rennert	7	6
(United States) Ti Gullikson (United States) To Gullikson	7^{7}	6
4	(United States) V Amaya (United States) H Pfister	6^{3}	1
(Paraguay) F González (United States) V Winitsky	7^{7}	6
LL	(United States) M Brunnberg (United States) D Gitlin	6^{4}	1

Semifinals
1	(United States) S Denton (Australia) M Edmondson	7^{8}	6^{3}	2
(United States) J McEnroe (United States) P Rennert	6^{6}	7^{7}	6
(United States) Ti Gullikson (United States) To Gullikson	6	6
(Paraguay) F González (United States) V Winitsky	4	4

Final
(United States) J McEnroe (United States) P Rennert	4	6	6^{3}
(United States) Ti Gullikson (United States) To Gullikson	6	3	7^{7}
