= 1985 Lipton International Players Championships – Women's doubles =

Women's doubles
- 1985 Lipton International Players Championships

Final
- Champions: (United States) Gigi Fernández (United States) Martina Navratilova
- Runners-up: (United States) Kathy Jordan (Czechoslovakia) Hana Mandlíková
- Score: 7–6^{(7–4)}, 6–2

Details
- Draw: 64
- Seeds: 16

Events
Singles	men	women
Doubles	men	women	mixed
Miami Open	· 1986 →

In the inaugural edition of the tournament, Gigi Fernández and Martina Navratilova won the title by defeating Kathy Jordan and Hana Mandlíková 7–6^{(7–4)}, 6–2 in the final.

Navratilova also won at singles and mixed doubles, completing all three titles open to women players. She became the first female player in 12 years to win a triple crown, after Billie Jean King won the three titles at Wimbledon in 1973.

== Seeds ==
1. (West Germany) Claudia Kohde-Kilsch / (Czechoslovakia) Helena Suková (semifinals)
2. (United States) Barbara Potter / (United States) Sharon Walsh (semifinals)
3. (United States) Chris Evert Lloyd / (Australia) Wendy Turnbull (third round)
4. (United States) Kathy Jordan / (Czechoslovakia) Hana Mandlíková (final)
5. (United Kingdom) Jo Durie / (United States) Ann Kiyomura (third round)
6. (United States) Betsy Nagelsen / (United States) Anne White (third round)
7. (United States) Alycia Moulton / (United States) Paula Smith (quarterfinals)
8. (United States) Candy Reynolds / (Australia) Elizabeth Smylie (second round)
9. (West Germany) Bettina Bunge / (West Germany) Eva Pfaff (second round)
10. (South Africa) Rosalyn Fairbank / (South Africa) Beverly Mould (third round)
11. (United States) Gigi Fernández / (United States) Martina Navratilova (champions)
12. (Switzerland) Christiane Jolissaint / (Netherlands) Marcella Mesker (first round)
13. (United States) Kathleen Horvath / (Romania) Virginia Ruzici (third round)
14. (United States) Elise Burgin / (United States) JoAnne Russell (third round, retired)
15. (United States) Lea Antonoplis / (United States) Sandy Collins (quarterfinals)
16. (Australia) Anne Minter / (Australia) Elizabeth Minter (second round)

== Draw ==
=== Key ===
- Q = Qualifier
- WC = Wild card
- LL = Lucky loser
- Alt = Alternate
- SE = Special exempt
- PR = Protected ranking
- ITF = ITF entry
- JE = Junior exempt
- w/o = Walkover
- r = Retired
- d = Defaulted
- SR = Special ranking

=== Finals ===
Quarterfinals
1	(West Germany) Claudia Kohde-Kilsch (Czechoslovakia) Helena Suková	6	6
15	(United States) Lea Antonoplis (United States) Sandy Collins	3	1
4	(United States) Kathy Jordan (Czechoslovakia) Hana Mandlíková	6	2	6
(United States) Mary Lou Piatek (United States) Wendy White	2	6	4
(United States) Terry Holladay (Socialist Federal Republic of Yugoslavia) Mima Jaušovec	5	1
11	(United States) Gigi Fernández (United States) Martina Navratilova	7	6
7	(United States) Alycia Moulton (United States) Paula Smith	5	7	2
2	(United States) Barbara Potter (United States) Sharon Walsh	7	5	6

Semifinals
1	(West Germany) Claudia Kohde-Kilsch (Czechoslovakia) Helena Suková	3	1
4	(United States) Kathy Jordan (Czechoslovakia) Hana Mandlíková	6	6
11	(United States) Gigi Fernández (United States) Martina Navratilova	6	4	7
2	(United States) Barbara Potter (United States) Sharon Walsh	2	6	5

Final
4	(United States) Kathy Jordan (Czechoslovakia) Hana Mandlíková	6^{4}	2
11	(United States) Gigi Fernández (United States) Martina Navratilova	7^{7}	6

=== Top half ===
==== Section 1 ====
First round
1	(West Germany) C Kohde-Kilsch (Czechoslovakia) H Suková	6	7
(United States) AM Fernandez (United States) P Louie	1	6
(France) S Amiach (France) C Vanier	3	6	7
(Switzerland) P Delhees (Brazil) P Medrado	6	4	6
(Argentina) M Paz (United States) R Reis	6	7
(United States) S Margolin (United States) T Mochizuki	4	6
(United States) L Allen (United States) K Sands	1	4
14	(United States) E Burgin (United States) J Russell	6	6
15	(United States) L Antonoplis (United States) S Collins	6	6
(United States) V Nelson (Peru) P Vásquez	3	0
(Brazil) C Monteiro (South Africa) Y Vermaak	6	6
(United States) P Casale (West Germany) S Graf	4	4
(United States) K Copeland (United States) L McNeil	5	4
(United States) L Howell (United States) F Raschiatore	7	6
(United States) C Benjamin (United States) B Gadusek	4	6
5	(United Kingdom) J Durie (United States) A Kiyomura	6	7

Second round
1	(West Germany) C Kohde-Kilsch (Czechoslovakia) H Suková	6	6
(France) S Amiach (France) C Vanier	3	0
(Argentina) M Paz (United States) R Reis	2	3
14	(United States) E Burgin (United States) J Russell	6	6
15	(United States) L Antonoplis (United States) S Collins	4	6	7
(Brazil) C Monteiro (South Africa) Y Vermaak	6	4	6
(United States) L Howell (United States) F Raschiatore	6	7	4
5	(United Kingdom) J Durie (United States) A Kiyomura	7	5	6

Third round
1	(West Germany) C Kohde-Kilsch (Czechoslovakia) H Suková	1
14	(United States) E Burgin (United States) J Russell	0^{r}
15	(United States) L Antonoplis (United States) S Collins	3	7	6
5	(United Kingdom) J Durie (United States) A Kiyomura	6	5	3

Quarterfinals
1	(West Germany) C Kohde-Kilsch (Czechoslovakia) H Suková	6	6
15	(United States) L Antonoplis (United States) S Collins	3	1

==== Section 2 ====
First round
4	(United States) K Jordan (Czechoslovakia) H Mandlíková	6	6
(United States) S Foltz (United States) D Spence	2	1
(France) C Tanvier (United Kingdom) V Wade	7	6
(Australia) B Remilton (United States) J Wright	5	0
(United States) H Crowe (United States) K Steinmetz	6	3	6
(Switzerland) L Drescher (Japan) E Inoue	3	6	1
(Australia) J Byrne (Australia) P Whytcross	3	6	6
12	(Switzerland) C Jolissaint (Netherlands) M Mesker	6	2	3
10	(South Africa) R Fairbank (South Africa) B Mould	6	6
(France) P Paradis (France) C Suire	3	3
(United States) J Kaplan (United States) K McDaniel	2	3
(United States) B Herr (United States) K Shaefer	6	6
(United States) ML Piatek (United States) W White	6	6
(United States) B Gerken (United States) H Ludloff	1	3
(United States) R Casals (United States) W Overton	0	3
8	(United States) C Reynolds (Australia) E Smylie	6	6

Second round
4	(United States) K Jordan (Czechoslovakia) H Mandlíková	6	6
(France) C Tanvier (United Kingdom) V Wade	3	0
(United States) H Crowe (United States) K Steinmetz	2	7	6
(Australia) J Byrne (Australia) P Whytcross	6	6	2
10	(South Africa) R Fairbank (South Africa) B Mould	4	6	6
(United States) B Herr (United States) K Shaefer	6	2	2
(United States) ML Piatek (United States) W White	6	2	6
8	(United States) C Reynolds (Australia) E Smylie	2	6	3

Third round
4	(United States) K Jordan (Czechoslovakia) H Mandlíková	6	6
(United States) H Crowe (United States) K Steinmetz	4	4
10	(South Africa) R Fairbank (South Africa) B Mould	4	7	4
(United States) ML Piatek (United States) W White	6	6	6

Quarterfinals
4	(United States) K Jordan (Czechoslovakia) H Mandlíková	6	2	6
(United States) ML Piatek (United States) W White	2	6	4

=== Bottom half ===
==== Section 3 ====
First round
6	(United States) B Nagelsen (United States) A White	4	6	6
(United States) P Barg (United States) L Bernstein	6	1	3
(Australia) S Leo (United States) S Mascarin	6	7
(Canada) K Dewis (United States) M Schillig	3	6
(United States) T Holladay (Socialist Federal Republic of Yugoslavia) M Jaušovec	6	6
(Canada) J Hetherington (Canada) H Pelletier	2	2
(Czechoslovakia) I Budařová (Czechoslovakia) M Skuherská	6	3
16	(Australia) A Minter (Australia) E Minter	7	6
11	(United States) G Fernández (United States) M Navratilova	6	6
(United Kingdom) S Gomer (United States) M Van Nostrand	3	4
(United States) S Rimes (Socialist Federal Republic of Yugoslavia) R Šašak	6	6
(United States) G Purdy (United States) M Quinlan	2	4
(United States) J Golder (United States) S Solomon	4	2
(Socialist Federal Republic of Yugoslavia) S Goleš (United States) E Raponi Longo	6	6
(Canada) C Bassett (Argentina) G Sabatini	0	1
3	(United States) C Evert Lloyd (Australia) W Turnbull	6	6

Second round
6	(United States) B Nagelsen (United States) A White	5	6	6
(Australia) S Leo (United States) S Mascarin	7	3	3
(United States) T Holladay (Socialist Federal Republic of Yugoslavia) M Jaušovec	2	6	6
16	(Australia) A Minter (Australia) E Minter	6	2	3
11	(United States) G Fernández (United States) M Navratilova	6	6
(United States) S Rimes (Socialist Federal Republic of Yugoslavia) R Šašak	0	0
(Socialist Federal Republic of Yugoslavia) S Goleš (United States) E Raponi Longo	1	0
3	(United States) C Evert Lloyd (Australia) W Turnbull	6	6

Third round
6	(United States) B Nagelsen (United States) A White	1	5
(United States) T Holladay (Socialist Federal Republic of Yugoslavia) M Jaušovec	6	7
11	(United States) G Fernández (United States) M Navratilova	6	6
3	(United States) C Evert Lloyd (Australia) W Turnbull	4	2

Quarterfinals
(United States) T Holladay (Socialist Federal Republic of Yugoslavia) M Jaušovec	5	1
11	(United States) G Fernández (United States) M Navratilova	7	6

==== Section 4 ====
First round
7	(United States) A Moulton (United States) P Smith	6	6
(France) MC Calleja (Greece) A Kanellopoulou	2	4
(Sweden) C Jexell (Denmark) T Scheuer-Larsen	3	6	6
(West Germany) D Dinu (Romania) D Moise	6	3	1
(United Kingdom) A Brown (South Africa) R Uys	3	6	4
(Peru) L Gildemeister (Argentina) A Villagrán	6	2	6
(West Germany) M Schropp (Czechoslovakia) K Skronská	5	0
9	(West Germany) B Bunge (West Germany) E Pfaff	7	6
13	(United States) K Horvath (Romania) V Ruzici	7	6
(Bulgaria) K Maleeva (Bulgaria) M Maleeva	6	4
(United States) L Bonder (Hungary) A Temesvári	6	6	6
(South Africa) J Mundel (United States) P Teeguarden	7	4	4
(United States) Z Garrison (United States) K Rinaldi	6	6
(United States) A Henricksson (United States) R White	4	4
(United States) J Klitch (United States) N Yeargin	1	5
2	(United States) B Potter (United States) S Walsh	6	7

Second round
7	(United States) A Moulton (United States) P Smith	6	6
(Sweden) C Jexell (Denmark) T Scheuer-Larsen	2	1
(Peru) L Gildemeister (Argentina) A Villagrán	6	6
9	(West Germany) B Bunge (West Germany) E Pfaff	4	2
13	(United States) K Horvath (Romania) V Ruzici	6	7	6
(United States) L Bonder (Hungary) A Temesvári	7	5	2
(United States) Z Garrison (United States) K Rinaldi
2	(United States) B Potter (United States) S Walsh	w/o

Third round
7	(United States) A Moulton (United States) P Smith	6	4	6
(Peru) L Gildemeister (Argentina) A Villagrán	0	6	0
13	(United States) K Horvath (Romania) V Ruzici	0	6	1
2	(United States) B Potter (United States) S Walsh	6	4	6

Quarterfinals
7	(United States) A Moulton (United States) P Smith	5	7	2
2	(United States) B Potter (United States) S Walsh	7	5	6
