= 1985 Lipton International Players Championships – Men's doubles =

Men's doubles
- 1985 Lipton International Players Championships

Final
- Champions: (United States) Paul Annacone (South Africa) Christo van Rensburg
- Runners-up: (United States) Sherwood Stewart (Australia) Kim Warwick
- Score: 7–5, 7–5, 6–4

Details
- Draw: 64
- Seeds: 16

Events
Singles	men	women
Doubles	men	women	mixed
- Miami Open

Paul Annacone and Christo van Rensburg won in the final 7–5, 7–5, 6–4 in the final against Sherwood Stewart and Kim Warwick.

== Seeds ==
1. (Czechoslovakia) Pavel Složil / (Czechoslovakia) Tomáš Šmíd (quarterfinals)
2. (Switzerland) Heinz Günthardt / (Hungary) Balázs Taróczy (second round)
3. (Sweden) Stefan Edberg / (Sweden) Anders Järryd (quarterfinals)
4. (United States) Ken Flach / (United States) Robert Seguso (third round)
5. (United States) Kevin Curren / (United States) Steve Denton (second round)
6. (Australia) Broderick Dyke / (Australia) John Fitzgerald (third round)
7. (United States) Fritz Buehning / (United States) Ferdi Taygan (quarterfinals)
8. (France) Henri Leconte / (France) Yannick Noah (semifinals)
9. (Sweden) Joakim Nyström / (Sweden) Mats Wilander (quarterfinals)
10. (United States) Sherwood Stewart / (Australia) Kim Warwick (final)
11. (United States) David Dowlen / (Nigeria) Nduka Odizor (second round)
12. (Paraguay) Francisco González / (United States) Matt Mitchell (third round)
13. (United States) Peter Fleming / (Czechoslovakia) Ivan Lendl (second round)
14. (Sweden) Jan Gunnarsson / (Denmark) Michael Mortensen (second round)
15. (United States) Tim Gullikson / (United States) Tom Gullikson (first round)
16. (Australia) Peter Doohan / (Australia) Michael Fancutt (third round)

== Draw ==
Key

- Q = Qualifier
- WC = Wild card
- LL = Lucky loser
- Alt = Alternate
- ITF = ITF entry
- PR = Protected ranking
- SR = Special ranking
- SE = Special exempt
- JE = Junior exempt
- JR = Junior Accelerator Programme entrant
- CO = College Accelerator Programme entrant
- NG = Next Gen Accelerator Program entrant
- w/o = Walkover
- r = Retired
- d = Defaulted

=== Finals ===
Semifinals
10	(United States) Sherwood Stewart (Australia) Kim Warwick	6	4	6	6
8	(France) Henri Leconte (France) Yannick Noah	2	6	3	3
(United States) Gary Donnelly (Australia) David Graham	5	6	6	3
(United States) Paul Annacone (South Africa) Christo van Rensburg	7	7	4	6

Final
10	(United States) Sherwood Stewart (Australia) Kim Warwick	5	5	4
(United States) Paul Annacone (South Africa) Christo van Rensburg	7	7	6

=== Top half ===
==== Section 1 ====
First round
1	(Czechoslovakia) P Složil (Czechoslovakia) T Šmíd	6	6
(Denmark) P Bastiansen (Sweden) H Sundström	1	4
(Argentina) E Bengoechea (Spain) A Tous	4	2
(United States) B Manson (United States) S Meister	6	6
(United States) A Andrews (United States) J Sadri	7	4	6
(United States) B Green (United States) T Mayotte	6	6	3
(United States) J Kriek (United States) B Scanlon	1	4
12	(Paraguay) F González (United States) M Mitchell	6	6
10	(United States) S Stewart (Australia) K Warwick	7	6
(India) A Amritraj (India) V Amritraj	6	3
(United States) J Canter (United States) E Sherbeck	1	5
(Spain) S Casal (Spain) E Sánchez	6	7
(United States) D Gitlin (United Kingdom) J Lloyd	6	6
(United States) D Cassidy (United States) G Layendecker	4	3
(Sweden) S Simonsson (Sweden) H Simonsson	5	6
6	(Australia) B Dyke (Australia) J Fitzgerald	7	7

Second round
1	(Czechoslovakia) P Složil (Czechoslovakia) T Šmíd	4	6	7
(United States) B Manson (United States) S Meister	6	2	5
(United States) A Andrews (United States) J Sadri	6	6	3
12	(Paraguay) F González (United States) M Mitchell	7	3	6
10	(United States) S Stewart (Australia) K Warwick	3	6	6
(Spain) S Casal (Spain) E Sánchez	6	1	4
(United States) D Gitlin (United Kingdom) J Lloyd	7	6	1
6	(Australia) B Dyke (Australia) J Fitzgerald	6	7	6

Third round
1	(Czechoslovakia) P Složil (Czechoslovakia) T Šmíd	6	6
12	(Paraguay) F González (United States) M Mitchell	2	4
10	(United States) S Stewart (Australia) K Warwick	6	6	6
6	(Australia) B Dyke (Australia) J Fitzgerald	7	1	3

Quarterfinals
1	(Czechoslovakia) P Složil (Czechoslovakia) T Šmíd	3	5
10	(United States) S Stewart (Australia) K Warwick	6	7

==== Section 2 ====
First round
3	(Sweden) S Edberg (Sweden) A Järryd	6	4	6
(United States) M Robertson (South Africa) D Tarr	4	6	3
(Australia) J Frawley (Netherlands) M Schapers	2	2
(Australia) J Alexander (Australia) B Drewett	6	6
(United States) S Davis (United States) B Testerman	7	3	6
(United States) D Pate (United States) H Pfister	5	6	1
(Australia) O Davidson (South Africa) R Moore	3	4
16	(Australia) P Doohan (Australia) M Fancutt	6	6
14	(Sweden) J Gunnarsson (Denmark) M Mortensen	6	7
(United States) M Bauer (Brazil) C Motta	4	6
(United States) G Holmes (United States) A Krickstein	6	7
(United States) J Arias (United States) E Korita	4	5
(United States) E Van't Hof (United States) V Winitsky	6	7
(South Africa) E Edwards (South Africa) D Visser	4	6
(Peru) P Arraya (United States) V Van Patten	3	4
8	(France) H Leconte (France) Y Noah	6	6

Second round
3	(Sweden) S Edberg (Sweden) A Järryd	6	6
(Australia) J Alexander (Australia) B Drewett	2	2
(United States) S Davis (United States) B Testerman	3	6	3
16	(Australia) P Doohan (Australia) M Fancutt	6	3	6
14	(Sweden) J Gunnarsson (Denmark) M Mortensen	6	3	3
(United States) G Holmes (United States) A Krickstein	2	6	6
(United States) E Van't Hof (United States) V Winitsky	7	6	4
8	(France) H Leconte (France) Y Noah	6	7	6

Third round
3	(Sweden) S Edberg (Sweden) A Järryd	6	7
16	(Australia) P Doohan (Australia) M Fancutt	4	5
(United States) G Holmes (United States) A Krickstein	1	6
8	(France) H Leconte (France) Y Noah	6	7

Quarterfinals
3	(Sweden) S Edberg (Sweden) A Järryd	6	6	6
8	(France) H Leconte (France) Y Noah	2	7	7

=== Bottom half ===
==== Section 3 ====
First round
5	(United States) K Curren (United States) S Denton	6	6
(United States) C B Cox (United States) T Moor	4	3
(United States) M Freeman (New Zealand) R Simpson	2	4
(United States) B Gilbert (Paraguay) V Pecci	6	6
(Israel) S Glickstein (Israel) S Perkiss	6	6	5
(United States) J Lapidus (United States) R Meyer	4	7	7
(United States) S Brawley (United States) R Nixon	4	1
9	(Sweden) J Nyström (Sweden) M Wilander	6	6
15	(United States) Tim Gullikson (United States) Tom Gullikson	6	3	2
(Puerto Rico) E Fernandez (United States) L Shiras	4	6	6
(United States) G Donnelly (Australia) D Graham	6	4	6
(United States) V Gerulaitis (Australia) F Stolle	1	6	4
(Czechoslovakia) L Pimek (United States) B Willenborg	6	3	7
(United States) L Stefanki (United States) R Van't Hof	4	6	5
(United States) A Kohlberg (Czechoslovakia) J Navrátil	2	3
4	(United States) K Flach (United States) R Seguso	6	6

Second round
5	(United States) K Curren (United States) S Denton	3	6
(United States) B Gilbert (Paraguay) V Pecci	6	7
(United States) J Lapidus (United States) R Meyer	4	2
9	(Sweden) J Nyström (Sweden) M Wilander	6	6
(Puerto Rico) E Fernandez (United States) L Shiras	1	6
(United States) G Donnelly (Australia) D Graham	6	7
(Czechoslovakia) L Pimek (United States) B Willenborg	6	7	0
4	(United States) K Flach (United States) R Seguso	7	6	6

Third round
(United States) B Gilbert (Paraguay) V Pecci	6	1
9	(Sweden) J Nyström (Sweden) M Wilander	7	6
(United States) G Donnelly (Australia) D Graham	6	7
4	(United States) K Flach (United States) R Seguso	4	5

Quarterfinals
9	(Sweden) J Nyström (Sweden) M Wilander	4	5
(United States) G Donnelly (Australia) D Graham	6	7

==== Section 4 ====
First round
7	(United States) F Buehning (United States) F Taygan	6	6
(United States) J Mattke (United States) D Saltz	3	2
(United States) L Bourne (United States) C Hooper	4	6	6
(United States) M Flur (United States) S McCain	6	4	2
(United States) M Leach (United States) J Turpin	5	3
(West Germany) B Becker (Poland) W Fibak	7	6
(United States) T Delatte (United States) C Wittus	4	6	4
11	(United States) D Dowlen (Nigeria) N Odizor	6	2	6
13	(United States) P Fleming (Czechoslovakia) I Lendl	6	6
(Chile) R Acuña (Chile) H Gildemeister	4	2
(United States) M Dickson (United States) T Wilkison	6	3
(United States) P Annacone (South Africa) C van Rensburg	7	6
(Hungary) Z Kuharszky (Brazil) J Soares	7	4	7
(United States) M De Palmer (United States) S Giammalva, Jr.	6	6	6
(West Germany) P Elter (Sweden) S Svensson	6	4
2	(Switzerland) H Günthardt (Hungary) B Taróczy	7	6

Second round
7	(United States) F Buehning (United States) F Taygan	7	3	6
(United States) L Bourne (United States) C Hooper	5	6	3
(West Germany) B Becker (Poland) W Fibak	7	6
11	(United States) D Dowlen (Nigeria) N Odizor	6	4
13	(United States) P Fleming (Czechoslovakia) I Lendl	6	6
(United States) P Annacone (South Africa) C van Rensburg	7	7
(Hungary) Z Kuharszky (Brazil) J Soares	7	6
2	(Switzerland) H Günthardt (Hungary) B Taróczy	6	3

Third round
7	(United States) F Buehning (United States) F Taygan	6	6
(West Germany) B Becker (Poland) W Fibak	4	4
(United States) P Annacone (South Africa) C van Rensburg	6	6
(Hungary) Z Kuharszky (Brazil) J Soares	1	4

Quarterfinals
7	(United States) F Buehning (United States) F Taygan	7	4	2
(United States) P Annacone (South Africa) C van Rensburg	6	6	6
