= 1985 Lipton International Players Championships – Men's singles =

Men's singles
- 1985 Lipton International Players Championships

Final
- Champion: (United States) Tim Mayotte
- Runner-up: (United States) Scott Davis
- Score: 4–6, 4–6, 6–3, 6–2, 6–4

Details
- Draw: 128 (8WC/16Q/3LL)
- Seeds: 16

Events
Singles	men	women
Doubles	men	women	mixed
- Miami Open

Tim Mayotte defeated Scott Davis in the final, 4–6, 4–6, 6–3, 6–2, 6–4 to win the inaugural men's singles tennis title at the 1985 Miami Open.

== Seeds ==
1. (Czechoslovakia) Ivan Lendl (fourth round)
2. (Sweden) Mats Wilander (fourth round)
3. (Sweden) Henrik Sundström (first round)
4. (Sweden) Anders Järryd (fourth round)
5. (United States) Aaron Krickstein (third round)
6. (United States) Johan Kriek (third round)
7. (United States) Kevin Curren (first round)
8. (Sweden) Joakim Nyström (third round)
9. (France) Yannick Noah (quarterfinals)
10. (United States) Jimmy Arias (third round)
11. (Czechoslovakia) Tomáš Šmíd (semifinals)
12. (United States) Vitas Gerulaitis (quarterfinals)
13. (Sweden) Stefan Edberg (quarterfinals)
14. (Spain) Juan Aguilera (second round)
15. (United States) Ben Testerman (second round)
16. (India) Ramesh Krishnan (first round)

== Main draw ==
Key

- Q = Qualifier
- WC = Wild card
- LL = Lucky loser
- Alt = Alternate
- ITF = ITF entry
- PR = Protected ranking
- SR = Special ranking
- SE = Special exempt
- JE = Junior exempt
- JR = Junior Accelerator Programme entrant
- CO = College Accelerator Programme entrant
- NG = Next Gen Accelerator Program entrant
- w/o = Walkover
- r = Retired
- d = Defaulted

=== Finals ===
Quarterfinals
13	(Sweden) Stefan Edberg	1	4	5
(United States) Scott Davis	6	6	7
11	(Czechoslovakia) Tomáš Šmíd	6	6	7
9	(France) Yannick Noah	3	3	5
(Sweden) Jan Gunnarsson	2	6	6	6
12	(United States) Vitas Gerulaitis	6	3	4	2
(United States) Tim Mayotte	6	6	6
(United States) Mike Leach	2	3	2

Semifinals
(United States) Scott Davis	7	6	4	6
11	(Czechoslovakia) Tomáš Šmíd	6	4	6	3
(Sweden) Jan Gunnarsson	6	2	6	1
(United States) Tim Mayotte	7	6	4	6

Final
(United States) Scott Davis	6	6	3	2	4
(United States) Tim Mayotte	4	4	6	6	6

=== Top half ===
==== Section 1 ====
First round
1	(Czechoslovakia) I Lendl	6	6
(United States) L Stefanki	2	0
(New Zealand) R Simpson	6	6	5
(United States) J Sadri	4	7	7
(Socialist Federal Republic of Yugoslavia) S Živojinović	6	6
Q	(United States) E Adams	4	4
(Paraguay) V Pecci	6	6
(France) H Leconte	1	2
Q	(United States) K Belcher	0	6	2
(Netherlands) M Schapers	6	4	6
(United States) H Pfister	6	6
Q	(United States) W Notar	1	4
(United Kingdom) J Lloyd	6	6
(Poland) W Fibak	7	7
(United States) D Pate	6	3
13	(Sweden) S Edberg	7	6

Second round
1	(Czechoslovakia) I Lendl	7	6
(United States) J Sadri	6	0
(Socialist Federal Republic of Yugoslavia) S Živojinović	3	6	6
(Paraguay) V Pecci	6	3	7
(Netherlands) M Schapers	3	6
(United States) H Pfister	6	7
(Poland) W Fibak	2	0
13	(Sweden) S Edberg	6	6

Third round
1	(Czechoslovakia) I Lendl	6	6
(Paraguay) V Pecci	2	4
(United States) H Pfister	3	4
13	(Sweden) S Edberg	6	6

Fourth round
1	(Czechoslovakia) I Lendl	4	6
13	(Sweden) S Edberg	6	7

==== Section 2 ====
First round
16	(India) R Krishnan	3	3
(United States) B Gilbert	6	6
(United States) S Davis	6	6
(Switzerland) J Hlasek	1	2
(Czechoslovakia) M Mečíř	7	6
Q	(Bolivia) M Martinez	6	1
(United States) J Lapidus	6	6	4
(United States) P Annacone	4	7	6
LL	(United States) M Flur	7	6
(Brazil) C Motta	6	1
(Argentina) E Bengoechea	6	6	4
LL	(United States) R Van't Hof	4	7	6
(United States) M Freeman	4	7	3
Q	(Puerto Rico) E Fernandez	6	5	6
(Switzerland) H Günthardt	3	2
8	(Sweden) J Nyström	6	6

Second round
(United States) B Gilbert	2	4
(United States) S Davis	6	6
(Czechoslovakia) M Mečíř	2	6
(United States) P Annacone	6	7
LL	(United States) M Flur	5	6	7
LL	(United States) R Van't Hof	7	4	5
Q	(Puerto Rico) E Fernandez	3	5
8	(Sweden) J Nyström	6	7

Third round
(United States) S Davis	7	6
(United States) P Annacone	5	4
LL	(United States) M Flur	1	6	6
8	(Sweden) J Nyström	6	3	4

Fourth round
(United States) S Davis	6	6
LL	(United States) M Flur	4	2

==== Section 3 ====
First round
4	(Sweden) A Järryd	7	6
WC	(Hungary) B Taróczy	6	3
(Paraguay) F González	7	3	4
(United States) Tim Gullikson	6	6	6
(Peru) P Arraya	6	4	6
(United States) P Fleming	4	6	4
(United States) V Winitsky	4	6	0
(Israel) S Glickstein	6	2	6
(United States) M Bauer	3	6	2
(United States) M Dickson	6	3	6
(West Germany) H Schwaier	5	3
(United States) V Van Patten	7	6
(United States) B Willenborg	4	6	7
(Hungary) Z Kuharszky	6	4	5
(Czechoslovakia) K Nováček	5	1
11	(Czechoslovakia) T Šmíd	7	6

Second round
4	(Sweden) A Järryd	6	6
(United States) Tim Gullikson	1	3
(Peru) P Arraya	6	6
(Israel) S Glickstein	7	7
(United States) M Dickson	2	6
(United States) V Van Patten	6	7
(United States) B Willenborg	3	4
11	(Czechoslovakia) T Šmíd	6	6

Third round
4	(Sweden) A Järryd	6	6
(Israel) S Glickstein	1	1
(United States) V Van Patten	6	6	5
11	(Czechoslovakia) T Šmíd	7	3	7

Fourth round
4	(Sweden) A Järryd	1	4
11	(Czechoslovakia) T Šmíd	6	6

==== Section 4 ====
First round
9	(France) Y Noah	5	7	6
WC	(South Africa) C van Rensburg	7	6	3
(United States) S Meister	3	3
(United States) T Moor	6	6
(Czechoslovakia) J Navrátil	4	6	6
(South Africa) D Visser	6	4	2
(United States) Tom Gullikson	6	3	7
Q	(United States) G Layendecker	3	6	6
(United States) J Brown	7	6
(Sweden) T Högstedt	6	3
(United States) S Giammalva, Jr.	6	6
(Spain) E Sánchez	0	4
(India) V Amritraj	6	6
(West Germany) P Elter	3	4
(United States) B Manson	1	3
6	(United States) J Kriek	6	6

Second round
9	(France) Y Noah	6	6
(United States) T Moor	2	4
(Czechoslovakia) J Navrátil	3	2
(United States) Tom Gullikson	6	6
(United States) J Brown	6	6
(United States) S Giammalva, Jr.	7	7
(India) V Amritraj	4	0
6	(United States) J Kriek	6	6

Third round
9	(France) Y Noah	7	6
(United States) Tom Gullikson	5	1
(United States) S Giammalva, Jr.	6	7
6	(United States) J Kriek	2	6

Fourth round
9	(France) Y Noah	6	6
(United States) S Giammalva, Jr.	3	4

=== Bottom half ===
==== Section 5 ====
First round
7	(United States) K Curren	3	7	6
Q	(United States) J Canter	6	5	7
WC	(Brazil) J Soares	2	5
(Australia) P Doohan	6	7
(United States) J Mattke	0	1
Q	(United States) R Seguso	6	6
(Sweden) J Gunnarsson	6	6
(Spain) A Tous	3	2
(United States) R Harmon	3	3
(United States) D Cassidy	6	6
(United States) T Wilkison	6	6
(Australia) B Drewett	1	4
(United States) E Korita	4	1
Q	(Australia) B Dyke	6	6
(Czechoslovakia) L Pimek	4	7	2
15	(United States) B Testerman	6	6	6

Second round
Q	(United States) J Canter	6	6
(Australia) P Doohan	2	3
Q	(United States) R Seguso	6	5	0
(Sweden) J Gunnarsson	4	7	6
(United States) D Cassidy	6	2	6
(United States) T Wilkison	4	6	7
Q	(Australia) B Dyke	7	4	6
15	(United States) B Testerman	6	6	2

Third round
Q	(United States) J Canter	6	3	4
(Sweden) J Gunnarsson	2	6	6
(United States) T Wilkison	5	5
Q	(Australia) B Dyke	7	7

Fourth round
(Sweden) J Gunnarsson	6	2	6
Q	(Australia) B Dyke	2	6	3

==== Section 6 ====
First round
12	(United States) V Gerulaitis	3	6	6
WC	(Australia) J Alexander	6	2	4
(United States) L Bourne	6	4
(Chile) H Gildemeister	7	6
(United States) M Mitchell	6	3	6
(Australia) J Fitzgerald	4	6	4
(Israel) S Perkiss	6	7
Q	(United States) C Willenborg	3	6
WC	(Czechoslovakia) M Vajda	3	6	6
(United States) T Nelson	6	2	3
(West Germany) A Maurer	7	7
(Czechoslovakia) P Složil	5	5
(France) T Benhabiles	6	6
(United States) C Hooper	1	1
Q	(Socialist Federal Republic of Yugoslavia) M Ostoja	6	6
3	(Sweden) H Sundström	2	2

Second round
12	(United States) V Gerulaitis	6	6
(Chile) H Gildemeister	1	2
(United States) M Mitchell	5	7	7
(Israel) S Perkiss	7	5	6
WC	(Czechoslovakia) M Vajda	w/o
(West Germany) A Maurer
(France) T Benhabiles	6	6	6
Q	(Socialist Federal Republic of Yugoslavia) M Ostoja	7	4	2

Third round
12	(United States) V Gerulaitis	6	6
(United States) M Mitchell	4	4
WC	(Czechoslovakia) M Vajda	7	3	2
(France) T Benhabiles	5	6	6

Fourth round
12	(United States) V Gerulaitis	6	7
(France) T Benhabiles	3	5

==== Section 7 ====
First round
5	(United States) A Krickstein	7	6
(France) T Tulasne	6	4
Q	(United States) M Anger	5	6
Q	(South Africa) M Robertson	7	7
WC	(United States) R Brown	7	4	5
(United States) G Holmes	6	6	7
(Australia) J Frawley	6	6	6
WC	(United States) H Solomon	3	7	2
(West Germany) B Becker	6	6
Q	(United States) J Rive	2	3
(United States) T Mayotte	7	4	6
(Nigeria) N Odizor	6	6	1
Q	(Spain) J Bardou	4	1
(United States) M Davis	6	6
(Argentina) G Vilas	6	4
14	(Spain) J Aguilera	7	6

Second round
5	(United States) A Krickstein	6	6
Q	(South Africa) M Robertson	2	3
(United States) G Holmes	6	7	6
(Australia) J Frawley	7	6	0
(West Germany) B Becker	2	3
(United States) T Mayotte	6	6
(United States) M Davis	7	6
14	(Spain) J Aguilera	5	4

Third round
5	(United States) A Krickstein	6	6
(United States) G Holmes	7	7
(United States) T Mayotte	6	6
(United States) M Davis	4	4

Fourth round
(United States) G Holmes	3	6
(United States) T Mayotte	6	7

==== Section 8 ====
First round
10	(United States) J Arias	6	1	6
(United States) B Scanlon	2	6	4
LL	(South Africa) D Tarr	6	5
(United States) L Shiras	7	7
(Chile) P Rebolledo	2
WC	(France) P Portes	0^{r}
(United States) M Leach	7	6
Q	(United States) R Nixon	6	4
(South Africa) E Edwards	6	6	4
(United Kingdom) S Shaw	4	7	6
(United States) B Green	7	6
(Uruguay) D Pérez	6	2
(Sweden) S Simonsson	6	6
Q	(United States) L Duncan	3	2
(United States) M De Palmer	2	3
2	(Sweden) M Wilander	6	6

Second round
10	(United States) J Arias	6	2	6
(United States) L Shiras	3	6	2
(Chile) P Rebolledo	3	1
(United States) M Leach	6	6
(United Kingdom) S Shaw	2	6	6
(United States) B Green	6	3	7
(Sweden) S Simonsson	7	1	0^{r}
2	(Sweden) M Wilander	6	6	1

Third round
10	(United States) J Arias	6	3
(United States) M Leach	7	6
(United States) B Green	3	6	4
2	(Sweden) M Wilander	6	4	6

Fourth round
(United States) M Leach	7	6
2	(Sweden) M Wilander	5	2
