= 1981 Seiko World Super Tennis =

- Date: 26–30 October
- Edition: 4th
- Category: Grand Prix (Super Series)
- Draw: 32S / 16D
- Prize money: $300,000
- Surface: Carpet / indoor
- Location: Tokyo, Japan
- Venue: Yoyogi National Stadium

Champions

Singles
- (United States) Vincent Van Patten

Doubles
- (United States) Victor Amaya / (United States) Hank Pfister
- Tokyo Indoor

The 1981 Seiko World Super Tennis also known as the Tokyo Indoor was a men's tennis tournament played on indoor carpet courts at the Yoyogi National Stadium in Tokyo, Japan that was part of the Super Series of the 1981 Volvo Grand Prix circuit. The tournament was held from 26 October through 30 October 1981. Matches were the best of three sets. Unseeded Vincent Van Patten won the singles titles. On his way to the final he defeated seeded players José Luis Clerc (3), Vitas Gerulaitis (5), and John McEnroe (1).

== Finals ==
=== Singles ===
(United States) Vincent Van Patten defeated (Australia) Mark Edmondson 6–2, 3–6, 6–3

- It was Van Patten's only singles title of his career.

=== Doubles ===
(United States) Victor Amaya / (United States) Hank Pfister defeated (Switzerland) Heinz Günthardt / (Hungary) Balázs Taróczy 6–4, 6–2
