= 1983 Seiko World Super Tennis =

- Date: 24–28 October
- Edition: 6th
- Draw: 32S / 16D
- Prize money: $300,000
- Surface: Carpet / indoor
- Location: Tokyo, Japan
- Venue: Yoyogi National Stadium

Champions

Singles
- (Czechoslovakia) Ivan Lendl

Doubles
- (Australia) Mark Edmondson / (United States) Sherwood Stewart
← 1982 ·	Tokyo Indoor	· 1984 →

The 1983 Seiko World Super Tennis, also known as the Tokyo Indoor, was a men's tennis tournament played on indoor carpet courts at the Yoyogi National Stadium in Tokyo in Japan that was part of the 1983 Volvo Grand Prix. The tournament was held from 24 October through 28 October 1983. It was a major tournament of the Grand Prix tennis circuit and matches were the best of three sets. John McEnroe was the defending champion but did not participate. First-seeded Ivan Lendl won the singles title, his eighth title of the season, and earned $75,000 first-prize money.

== Finals ==
=== Singles ===
(Czechoslovakia) Ivan Lendl defeated (United States) Scott Davis 3–6, 6–3, 6–4

- It was Lendl's 7th singles title of the year and the 39th of his career.

=== Doubles ===
(Australia) Mark Edmondson / (United States) Sherwood Stewart defeated (United States) Steve Denton / (Australia) John Fitzgerald 6–1, 6–4
