= 1983 Seiko World Super Tennis – Singles =

Singles
- 1983 Seiko World Super Tennis

Final
- Champion: (Czechoslovakia) Ivan Lendl
- Runner-up: (United States) Scott Davis
- Score: 3–6, 6–3, 6–4

Details
- Draw: 32
- Seeds: 8

Events
Singles	Doubles
- Tokyo Indoor

John McEnroe was the defending champion, but did not participate this year.

Ivan Lendl won the tournament, beating Scott Davis in the final, 3–6, 6–3, 6–4.

== Seeds ==
1. (Czechoslovakia) Ivan Lendl (champion)
2. (United States) Jimmy Connors (semifinals)
3. (Ecuador) Andrés Gómez (quarterfinals)
4. (United States) Vitas Gerulaitis (second round)
5. (United States) Eliot Teltscher (quarterfinals)
6. (France) Henri Leconte (first round)
7. (United States) Hank Pfister (second round)
8. (United States) Steve Denton (first round)

== Draw ==
Key

- Q = Qualifier
- WC = Wild card
- LL = Lucky loser
- Alt = Alternate
- ITF = ITF entry
- PR = Protected ranking
- SR = Special ranking
- SE = Special exempt
- JE = Junior exempt
- JR = Junior Accelerator Programme entrant
- CO = College Accelerator Programme entrant
- NG = Next Gen Accelerator Program entrant
- w/o = Walkover
- r = Retired
- d = Defaulted

=== Finals ===
Semifinals
1	(Czechoslovakia) Ivan Lendl	6	6
(United States) Brad Gilbert	2	1
(United States) Scott Davis	6	6
2	(United States) Jimmy Connors	3	4

Final
1	(Czechoslovakia) Ivan Lendl	3	6	6
(United States) Scott Davis	6	3	4

=== Top half ===
First round
1	(Czechoslovakia) I Lendl	7	6
(United States) S Giammalva Jr.	5	1
(Paraguay) F González	6	7
(Japan) T Fukui	4	5
(United States) C Hooper	3	6	6
(Australia) B Drewett	6	2	2
(Australia) J Fitzgerald	4	0
5	(United States) E Teltscher	6	6
4	(United States) V Gerulaitis	6	7
(Sweden) T Högstedt	2	5
(United States) B Gilbert	6	7
(United States) F Buehning	2	5
Q	(United States) M Freeman	5	7	4
Q	(United States) T Gullikson	7	5	6
(United States) P Du Pré	3	6	4
7	(United States) H Pfister	6	1	6

Second round
1	(Czechoslovakia) I Lendl	6	6
(Paraguay) F González	1	3
(United States) C Hooper	4	6	6
5	(United States) E Teltscher	6	4	7
4	(United States) V Gerulaitis	3	6	5
(United States) B Gilbert	6	2	7
Q	(United States) T Gullikson	6	5	6
7	(United States) H Pfister	4	7	4

Quarterfinals
1	(Czechoslovakia) I Lendl	6	6
5	(United States) E Teltscher	2	4
(United States) B Gilbert	6	6
Q	(United States) T Gullikson	3	3

Semifinals
1	(Czechoslovakia) I Lendl	6	6
(United States) B Gilbert	2	1

=== Bottom half ===
First round
6	(France) H Leconte	4	6
(United States) S Davis	6	7
(France) T Tulasne	6	5	6
(Italy) G Ocleppo	3	7	4
(United States) B Teacher	6	4
(Australia) M Edmondson	7	6
(France) C Roger-Vasselin	4	1
3	(Ecuador) A Gómez	6	6
8	(United States) S Denton	6	4
Q	(Canada) G Michibata	7	6
(United States) R Van't Hof	4	4
(United States) M Bauer	6	6
(United States) V Van Patten	2	6	5
Q	(United States) V Winitsky	6	4	7
(Japan) H Shirato	0	1
2	(United States) J Connors	6	6

Second round
(United States) S Davis	2	6	6
(France) T Tulasne	6	4	3
(Australia) M Edmondson	4	4
3	(Ecuador) A Gómez	6	6
Q	(Canada) G Michibata	7	6
(United States) M Bauer	6	2
Q	(United States) V Winitsky	3	1
2	(United States) J Connors	6	6

Quarterfinals
(United States) S Davis	6	4	6
3	(Ecuador) A Gómez	4	6	2
Q	(Canada) G Michibata	3	1
2	(United States) J Connors	6	6

Semifinals
(United States) S Davis	6	6
2	(United States) J Connors	3	4
