= 1985 Lipton International Players Championships – Women's singles =

Women's singles
- 1985 Lipton International Players Championships

Final
- Champion: (United States) Martina Navratilova
- Runner-up: (United States) Chris Evert-Lloyd
- Score: 6–2, 6–4

Details
- Draw: 128 (8Q/3LL)
- Seeds: 16

Events
Singles	men	women
Doubles	men	women	mixed
Miami Open	· 1986 →

Martina Navratilova won in the final 6–2, 6–4 against Chris Evert-Lloyd.

Navratilova also won at doubles and mixed doubles, completing all three titles open to women players. She became the first female player in 12 years to win a triple crown, after Billie Jean King won the three titles at Wimbledon in 1973.

== Seeds ==
A champion seed is indicated in bold text while text in italics indicates the round in which that seed was eliminated.

1. (United States) **Martina Navratilova (champion)**
2. (United States) Chris Evert-Lloyd (final)
3. (Australia) Wendy Turnbull (fourth round)
4. (Bulgaria) Manuela Maleeva (second round)
5. (West Germany) Claudia Kohde-Kilsch (first round)
6. (Czechoslovakia) Helena Suková (second round)
7. (Czechoslovakia) Hana Mandlíková (quarterfinals)
8. (United States) Zina Garrison (third round)
9. (United States) Kathy Jordan (fourth round)
10. (Canada) Carling Bassett (semifinals)
11. (United States) Bonnie Gadusek (third round)
12. (United States) Barbara Potter (quarterfinals)
13. (Hungary) Andrea Temesvári (quarterfinals)
14. (United States) Pam Casale (fourth round)
15. (Sweden) Catarina Lindqvist (fourth round)
16. (West Germany) Sylvia Hanika (first round)

== Draw ==
=== Key ===
- Q = Qualifier
- WC = Wild card
- LL = Lucky loser
- Alt = Alternate
- SE = Special exempt
- PR = Protected ranking
- ITF = ITF entry
- JE = Junior exempt
- w/o = Walkover
- r = Retired
- d = Defaulted
- SR = Special ranking

=== Finals ===
Quarterfinals
1	(United States) **Martina Navratilova**	**6**	**6**
(West Germany) Bettina Bunge	4	4
10	(Canada) **Carling Bassett**	**7**	**6**
7	(Czechoslovakia) Hana Mandlíková	5	2
(West Germany) **Steffi Graf**	**6**	**6**
13	(Hungary) Andrea Temesvári	2	1
12	(United States) Barbara Potter	**6**	4	1
2	(United States) **Chris Evert-Lloyd**	4	**6**	**6**

Semifinals
1	(United States) **Martina Navratilova**	**6**	**6**
10	(Canada) Carling Bassett	3	3
(West Germany) Steffi Graf	4	2
2	(United States) **Chris Evert-Lloyd**	**6**	**6**

Final
1	(United States) **Martina Navratilova**	**6**	**6**
2	(United States) Chris Evert-Lloyd	2	4

=== Top half ===
==== Section 1 ====
First round
1	(United States) **M Navratilova**	**6**	**6**
(United States) M Van Nostrand	0	1
(United States) S Walsh	3	3
(United States) **R White**	**6**	**6**
(United States) **J Klitch**	**6**	1	**6**
(France) P Paradis	4	**6**	1
(France) **C Suire**	3	**6**	**6**
(West Germany) M Schropp	**6**	3	2
(United States) K Keil	4	1
(United States) **B Nagelsen**	**6**	**6**
(Czechoslovakia) K Skronská	6	2
(United Kingdom) **S Gomer**	**7**	**6**
(United States) L Allen	5	0
(Denmark) **T Scheuer-Larsen**	**7**	**6**
(United States) G Fernández	3	0
15	(Sweden) **C Lindqvist**	**6**	**6**

Second round
1	(United States) **M Navratilova**	**6**	**6**
(United States) R White	0	3
(United States) J Klitch	2	3
(France) **C Suire**	**6**	**6**
(United States) B Nagelsen	4	2
(United Kingdom) **S Gomer**	**6**	**6**
(Denmark) T Scheuer-Larsen	2	1
15	(Sweden) **C Lindqvist**	**6**	**6**

Third round
1	(United States) **M Navratilova**	**6**	**6**
(France) C Suire	1	2
(United Kingdom) S Gomer	4	1
15	(Sweden) **C Lindqvist**	**6**	**6**

Fourth round
1	(United States) **M Navratilova**	**6**	3	**6**
15	(Sweden) C Lindqvist	4	**6**	4

==== Section 2 ====
First round
14	(United States) **P Casale**	**6**	**6**
(United States) A White	3	2
(United States) M L Piatek	3	0
(Brazil) **P Medrado**	**6**	**6**
(Sweden) **C Karlsson**	2	**7**	**7**
(Austria) P Huber	**6**	5	5
(United States) **S Mascarin**	**6**	**6**
(United States) R Casals	3	2
(United Kingdom) J Durie	3	4
Q	(Soviet Union) **L Savchenko**	**6**	**6**
(United States) **K Gompert**	**6**	**6**
(United States) C Benjamin	1	2
(France) M-C Calleja	1	2
(West Germany) **B Bunge**	**6**	**6**
(United States) **E Burgin**	**7**	**6**
5	(West Germany) C Kohde-Kilsch	5	3

Second round
14	(United States) **P Casale**	**6**	**6**
(Brazil) P Medrado	4	3
(Sweden) C Karlsson	6	2
(United States) **S Mascarin**	**7**	**6**
Q	(Soviet Union) **L Savchenko**	**w/o**
(United States) K Gompert
(West Germany) **B Bunge**	**6**	**6**
(United States) E Burgin	2	2

Third round
14	(United States) **P Casale**	**6**	6	**6**
(United States) S Mascarin	0	**7**	1
Q	(Soviet Union) L Savchenko	4	3
(West Germany) **B Bunge**	**6**	**6**

Fourth round
14	(United States) P Casale	2	**7**	5
(West Germany) **B Bunge**	**6**	6	**7**

==== Section 3 ====
First round
4	(Bulgaria) **M Maleeva**	**6**	**6**
Q	(Greece) A Kanellopoulou	2	3
(United States) **K Shaefer**	**6**	**6**
(Netherlands) M Mesker	0	2
(United States) A Holton	2	4
(Argentina) **G Sabatini**	**6**	**6**
(United Kingdom) **A Croft**	**6**	**6**
(Bulgaria) K Maleeva	2	2
(United States) P Teeguarden	4	4
(Socialist Federal Republic of Yugoslavia) **S Goleš**	**6**	**6**
(United States) A Henricksson	1	2
(United States) **S Rehe**	**6**	**6**
(South Africa) **R Fairbank**	**7**	**7**
(Australia) A Minter	6	6
Q	(United States) P Fendick	**6**	4	4
10	(Canada) **C Bassett**	4	**6**	**6**

Second round
4	(Bulgaria) M Maleeva	4	**6**	4
(United States) **K Shaefer**	**6**	2	**6**
(Argentina) **G Sabatini**	**6**	**6**
(United Kingdom) A Croft	1	3
(Socialist Federal Republic of Yugoslavia) S Goleš	2	0
(United States) **S Rehe**	**6**	**6**
(South Africa) R Fairbank	2	3
10	(Canada) **C Bassett**	**6**	**6**

Third round
(United States) K Shaefer	3	1
(Argentina) **G Sabatini**	**6**	**6**
(United States) S Rehe	2	3
10	(Canada) **C Bassett**	**6**	**6**

Fourth round
(Argentina) G Sabatini	0	4
10	(Canada) **C Bassett**	**6**	**6**

==== Section 4 ====
First round
11	(United States) **B Gadusek**	**7**	**7**
(Argentina) A Villagrán	5	6
(United States) **T Holladay**	**6**	**6**
(United States) K Steinmetz	4	2
(United States) C Reynolds	0	0
(United States) **M J Fernández**	**6**	**6**
(South Africa) **Y Vermaak**	**6**	**6**
(United States) T Phelps	3	2
(United States) **M Gurney**	**6**	**6**
(United States) K Horvath	1	3
(United States) **J Golder**	**6**	**6**
(United States) H Ludloff	0	3
(United States) **K Cummings**	**6**	**6**
(United States) W White	4	1
(Italy) R Reggi	3	0
7	(Czechoslovakia) **H Mandlíková**	**6**	**6**

Second round
11	(United States) **B Gadusek**	**6**	**6**
(United States) T Holladay	0	1
(United States) **M J Fernández**	**6**	**6**
(South Africa) Y Vermaak	3	3
(United States) **M Gurney**	**6**	**6**
(United States) J Golder	1	0
(United States) K Cummings	2	5
7	(Czechoslovakia) **H Mandlíková**	**6**	**7**

Third round
11	(United States) B Gadusek	6	6
(United States) **M J Fernández**	**7**	**7**
(United States) M Gurney	3	**6**	3
7	(Czechoslovakia) **H Mandlíková**	**6**	3	**6**

Fourth round
(United States) M J Fernández	3	0
7	(Czechoslovakia) **H Mandlíková**	**6**	**6**

=== Bottom half ===
==== Section 5 ====
First round
8	(United States) **Z Garrison**	3	**6**	**6**
(Switzerland) C Jolissaint	**6**	3	1
(Peru) P Vásquez	1	2
(United States) **J Russell**	**6**	**6**
(United States) **K Rinaldi**	**7**	**6**
(United States) L Spain-Short	6	4
LL	(South Africa) J Mundel	4	1
(Czechoslovakia) **M Skuherská**	**6**	**6**
(Socialist Federal Republic of Yugoslavia) **M Jaušovec**	**6**	**6**
Q	(Czechoslovakia) A Holíková	4	3
(France) **C Tanvier**	**6**	**6**
(United States) M Washington	2	3
Q	(Hungary) C Bartos	3	**6**	5
(United Kingdom) **V Wade**	**6**	4	**7**
(West Germany) **S Graf**	**6**	**6**
16	(West Germany) S Hanika	2	4

Second round
8	(United States) **Z Garrison**	**6**	**6**
(United States) J Russell	4	1
(United States) **K Rinaldi**	**6**	**6**
(Czechoslovakia) M Skuherská	1	2
(Socialist Federal Republic of Yugoslavia) M Jaušovec	1	3
(France) **C Tanvier**	**6**	**6**
(United Kingdom) V Wade	2	2
(West Germany) **S Graf**	**6**	**6**

Third round
8	(United States) Z Garrison	5	1
(United States) **K Rinaldi**	**7**	**6**
(France) C Tanvier	3	5
(West Germany) **S Graf**	**6**	**7**

Fourth round
(United States) K Rinaldi	1	0	r
(West Germany) **S Graf**	**6**	**1**

==== Section 6 ====
First round
13	(Hungary) **A Temesvári**	**6**	**6**
(Italy) S Cecchini	2	2
(United States) S Solomon	**6**	3	4
(United States) **B Gerken**	4	**6**	**6**
(United States) **V Nelson**	**6**	**6**
(Soviet Union) N Reva	1	1
(West Germany) E Pfaff	2	2
(United States) **L Antonoplis**	**6**	**6**
(United States) K Sands	**6**	1	4
(United States) **B Herr**	4	**6**	**6**
(United States) **E Raponi-Longo**	**6**	**7**
(South Africa) R Uys	4	5
LL	(Sweden) **C Jexell**	**6**	5	**6**
Q	(Switzerland) K Stampfli	4	**7**	3
(Japan) M Yanagi	6	5
3	(Australia) **W Turnbull**	**7**	**7**

Second round
13	(Hungary) **A Temesvári**	**6**	**6**
(United States) B Gerken	3	4
(United States) V Nelson	6	**7**	4
(United States) **L Antonoplis**	**7**	6	**6**
(United States) **B Herr**	**6**	4	**7**
(United States) E Raponi-Longo	1	**6**	6
LL	(Sweden) C Jexell	3	4
3	(Australia) **W Turnbull**	**6**	**6**

Third round
13	(Hungary) **A Temesvári**	**6**	**7**
(United States) L Antonoplis	2	5
(United States) B Herr	4	2
3	(Australia) **W Turnbull**	**6**	**6**

Fourth round
13	(Hungary) **A Temesvári**	**6**	**6**
3	(Australia) W Turnbull	4	3

==== Section 7 ====
First round
6	(Czechoslovakia) **H Suková**	**6**	**6**
Q	(United States) A Hulbert	3	4
(Australia) E Minter	1	1
(Switzerland) **L Drescher**	**6**	**6**
(United Kingdom) A Brown	1	3
(Romania) **V Ruzici**	**6**	**6**
(Japan) E Inoue	**6**	5	3
Q	(Brazil) **N Dias**	1	**7**	**6**
(United States) **L McNeil**	**7**	**6**
(Peru) L Gildemeister	5	1
(South Africa) **B Mould**	**6**	4	**7**
(Australia) S Leo	4	**6**	6
LL	(Sweden) **C Anderholm**	**6**	**6**
(Switzerland) P Jauch-Delhees	3	3
(Czechoslovakia) I Budařová	6	1
12	(United States) **B Potter**	**7**	**6**

Second round
6	(Czechoslovakia) H Suková	6	6
(Switzerland) **L Drescher**	**7**	**7**
(Romania) **V Ruzici**	**7**	**6**
Q	(Brazil) N Dias	5	1
(United States) **L McNeil**	**7**	**6**
(South Africa) B Mould	5	1
LL	(Sweden) C Anderholm	2	1
12	(United States) **B Potter**	**6**	**6**

Third round
(Switzerland) **L Drescher**	**6**	**6**
(Romania) V Ruzici	2	4
(United States) L McNeil	3	2
12	(United States) **B Potter**	**6**	**6**

Fourth round
(Switzerland) L Drescher	**6**	1	0
12	(United States) **B Potter**	2	**6**	**6**

==== Section 8 ====
First round
9	(United States) **K Jordan**	**6**	1	**7**
(United States) L Bonder	2	**6**	6
(Australia) **E Smylie**	**6**	**6**
(United States) G Purdy	2	2
(United States) **P Louie**	**6**	**6**
(France) S Amiach	3	2
(United States) S Collins	**6**	4	3
(Australia) **D Balestrat**	4	**6**	**6**
(United States) **M Quinlan**	6	**6**	**6**
(United States) M Brown	**7**	4	4
(United States) **A Moulton**	**6**	**7**
(United States) D Spence	2	6
(United States) **S Foltz**	**6**	**6**
(United States) G Kim	3	2
(France) C Vanier	0	2
2	(United States) **C Evert-Lloyd**	**6**	**6**

Second round
9	(United States) **K Jordan**	**6**	**6**
(Australia) E Smylie	2	4
(United States) **P Louie**	**6**	**6**
(Australia) D Balestrat	3	3
(United States) M Quinlan	0	2
(United States) **A Moulton**	**6**	**6**
(United States) S Foltz	4	1
2	(United States) **C Evert-Lloyd**	**6**	**6**

Third round
9	(United States) **K Jordan**	3	**6**	**6**
(United States) P Louie	**6**	1	4
(United States) A Moulton	3	2
2	(United States) **C Evert-Lloyd**	**6**	**6**

Fourth round
9	(United States) K Jordan	4	4
2	(United States) **C Evert-Lloyd**	**6**	**6**
