= The Break (1995 film) =

- DVD cover
- Directed by: Lee H. Katzin
- Starring: Vincent Van Patten
- Release date: September 1, 1995
- Running time: 104 minutes
- Country: United States
- Language: English

The Break is a 1995 film directed by Lee H. Katzin. It stars Vincent Van Patten as Nick, a former tennis player turned coach to a new up and coming player, and Rae Dawn Chong as a former girlfriend. The film appeared during the 1990s, mostly on cable TV.

== Cast ==
- Vincent Van Patten as Nick Irons
- Rae Dawn Chong as Jennifer Hudson
- Martin Sheen as Gil Robbins
- Valerie Perrine as Delores Smith
- Betsy Russell as Candy
- Ben Jorgensen as Joel Robbins
