= 1985 Lipton International Players Championships =

- Date: February 4–18
- Edition: 1st
- Surface: Hard / outdoor
- Location: Delray Beach, Florida, U.S.
- Venue: Laver's International Tennis Resort

Champions

Men's singles
- (United States) Tim Mayotte

Women's singles
- (United States) Martina Navratilova

Men's doubles
- (United States) Paul Annacone / (South Africa) Christo van Rensburg

Women's doubles
- (United States) Gigi Fernández / (United States) Martina Navratilova

Mixed doubles
- (Switzerland) Heinz Günthardt / (United States) Martina Navratilova
Miami Open	· 1986 →

The 1985 Lipton International Players Championships was a tennis tournament played on outdoor hard courts. It was the 1st edition of the Miami Masters and was part of the 1985 Nabisco Grand Prix and the 1984 Virginia Slims World Championship Series. (Note: The 1984 Virginia Slims World Championship Series ran from March 1984 through March 1985.) Both the men's and the women's events took place at Laver's International Tennis Resort in Delray Beach, Florida from February 4 through February 18, 1985.

== Prize money ==
Event	W	F	SF	QF	Round of 16	Round of 32	Round of 64	Round of 128
Men's singles	$112,500	$56,250	$28,125	$14,250	$8,250	$4,500	$2,625	$1,265
Men's doubles*	$45,000	$22,500	$11,250	$4,500	$2,500	$1,125	$655	—

_{*per team}

== Finals ==
=== Men's singles ===
(United States) Tim Mayotte defeated (United States) Scott Davis 4–6, 4–6, 6–3, 6–2, 6–4

- It was Mayotte's only title of the year and the 2nd of his career.

=== Women's singles ===
(United States) Martina Navratilova defeated (United States) Chris Evert-Lloyd 6–2, 6–4

- It was Navratilova's 2nd singles title of the year and the 101st of her career.

=== Men's doubles ===
(United States) Paul Annacone / (South Africa) Christo van Rensburg defeated (United States) Sherwood Stewart / (Australia) Kim Warwick 7–5, 7–5, 6–4

- It was Annacone's 1st title of the year and the 2nd of his career. It was van Rensburg's 1st title of the year and the 3rd of his career.

=== Women's doubles ===
(United States) Gigi Fernández / (United States) Martina Navratilova defeated (United States) Kathy Jordan / (Czechoslovakia) Hana Mandlíková 7–6^{(7–4)}, 6–2

- It was Fernández's 1st title of the year and the 1st of her career. It was Navratilova's 1st title of the year and the 202nd of her career.

=== Mixed doubles ===
(Switzerland) Heinz Günthardt / (United States) Martina Navratilova defeated (United States) Mike Bauer / (France) Catherine Tanvier 6–2, 6–2
