= 1983 Seiko World Super Tennis – Doubles =

Doubles
- 1983 Seiko World Super Tennis

Final
- Champions: (Australia) Mark Edmondson (United States) Sherwood Stewart
- Runners-up: (United States) Steve Denton (Australia) John Fitzgerald
- Score: 6–1, 6–4

Details
- Draw: 16
- Seeds: 4

Events
Singles	Doubles
- Tokyo Indoor

Tim Gullikson and Tom Gullikson were the defending champions, but lost in the quarterfinals this year.

Mark Edmondson and Sherwood Stewart won the title, defeating Steve Denton and John Fitzgerald 6–1, 6–4 in the final.

== Seeds ==
1. (United States) Tim Gullikson / (United States) Tom Gullikson (quarterfinals)
2. (Australia) Mark Edmondson / (United States) Sherwood Stewart (champions)
3. (United States) Fritz Buehning / (United States) Ferdi Taygan (quarterfinals)
4. (Paraguay) Francisco González / (United States) Van Winitsky (first round)

== Draw ==
Key

- Q = Qualifier
- WC = Wild card
- LL = Lucky loser
- Alt = Alternate
- ITF = ITF entry
- PR = Protected ranking
- SR = Special ranking
- SE = Special exempt
- JE = Junior exempt
- JR = Junior Accelerator Programme entrant
- CO = College Accelerator Programme entrant
- NG = Next Gen Accelerator Program entrant
- w/o = Walkover
- r = Retired
- d = Defaulted

=== Draw ===
First round
1	(United States) Ti Gullikson (United States) To Gullikson	7	6
(United States) M Bauer (United States) L Stefanki	6	1
(United States) S Davis (United States) R Van't Hof	6	7	6
(Australia) W Hampson (Australia) CA Miller	7	6	0
(United States) S Denton (Australia) J Fitzgerald	6	7
4	(Paraguay) F González (United States) V Winitsky	4	5
(United States) S Giammalva Jr. (United States) S Meister	6	6
(United States) A Andrews (United States) M Davis	3	4
(Australia) B Dyke (Australia) R Frawley	7	6	6
(United States) V Amaya (United States) E Teltscher	6	7	3
3	(United States) F Buehning (United States) F Taygan	6	6
(Australia) D Graham (Australia) L Warder	4	2
(United States) D Dowlen (Nigeria) N Odizor	7	6
(Australia) B Drewett (Ecuador) A Gómez	6	3
(Japan) K Hirai (Japan) J Kamiwazumi	2	2
2	(Australia) M Edmondson (United States) S Stewart	6	6

Quarterfinals
1	(United States) Ti Gullikson (United States) To Gullikson	4	7	4
(United States) S Davis (United States) R Van't Hof	6	6	6
(United States) S Denton (Australia) J Fitzgerald	6	6
(United States) S Giammalva Jr. (United States) S Meister	3	4
(Australia) B Dyke (Australia) R Frawley	6	7
3	(United States) F Buehning (United States) F Taygan	4	6
(United States) D Dowlen (Nigeria) N Odizor	3	2
2	(Australia) M Edmondson (United States) S Stewart	6	6

Semifinals
(United States) S Davis (United States) R Van't Hof	5	2
(United States) S Denton (Australia) J Fitzgerald	7	6
(Australia) B Dyke (Australia) R Frawley	1	4
2	(Australia) M Edmondson (United States) S Stewart	6	6

Final
(United States) S Denton (Australia) J Fitzgerald	1	4
2	(Australia) M Edmondson (United States) S Stewart	6	6
