= 1982 Seiko Super Tennis =

- Date: 25–29 October
- Edition: 5th
- Category: Grand Prix circuit
- Draw: 32S / 16D
- Prize money: $300,000
- Surface: Carpet / indoor
- Location: Tokyo, Japan
- Venue: Yoyogi National Stadium

Champions

Singles
- (United States) John McEnroe

Doubles
- (United States) Tim Gullikson / (United States) Tom Gullikson
- Tokyo Indoor

The 1982 Seiko Super Tennis, also known as the Tokyo Indoor, was a men's tennis tournament played on indoor carpet courts (Note: A new court was laid over the Olympic pool and played considerable slower than the court used in previous editions.) at the Yoyogi National Stadium in Tokyo, Japan that was part of the 1982 Volvo Grand Prix circuit. It was the fifth edition of the tournament and was held from 25 October through 29 October 1982. Matches were the best of three sets. First-seeded John McEnroe won the singles title without the loss of a set and earned $60,000 first-prize money.

== Finals ==
=== Singles ===
(United States) John McEnroe defeated (Australia) Peter McNamara 7–6^{(8–6)}, 7–5

- It was McEnroe's 4th singles title of the year and the 38th of his career.

=== Doubles ===
(United States) Tim Gullikson / (United States) Tom Gullikson defeated (United States) John McEnroe / (United States) Peter Rennert 6–4, 3–6, 7–6
