= Miami Open (tennis) =

Tennis tournament held in Florida

Coordinates: 25°42′29″N 80°09′32″W

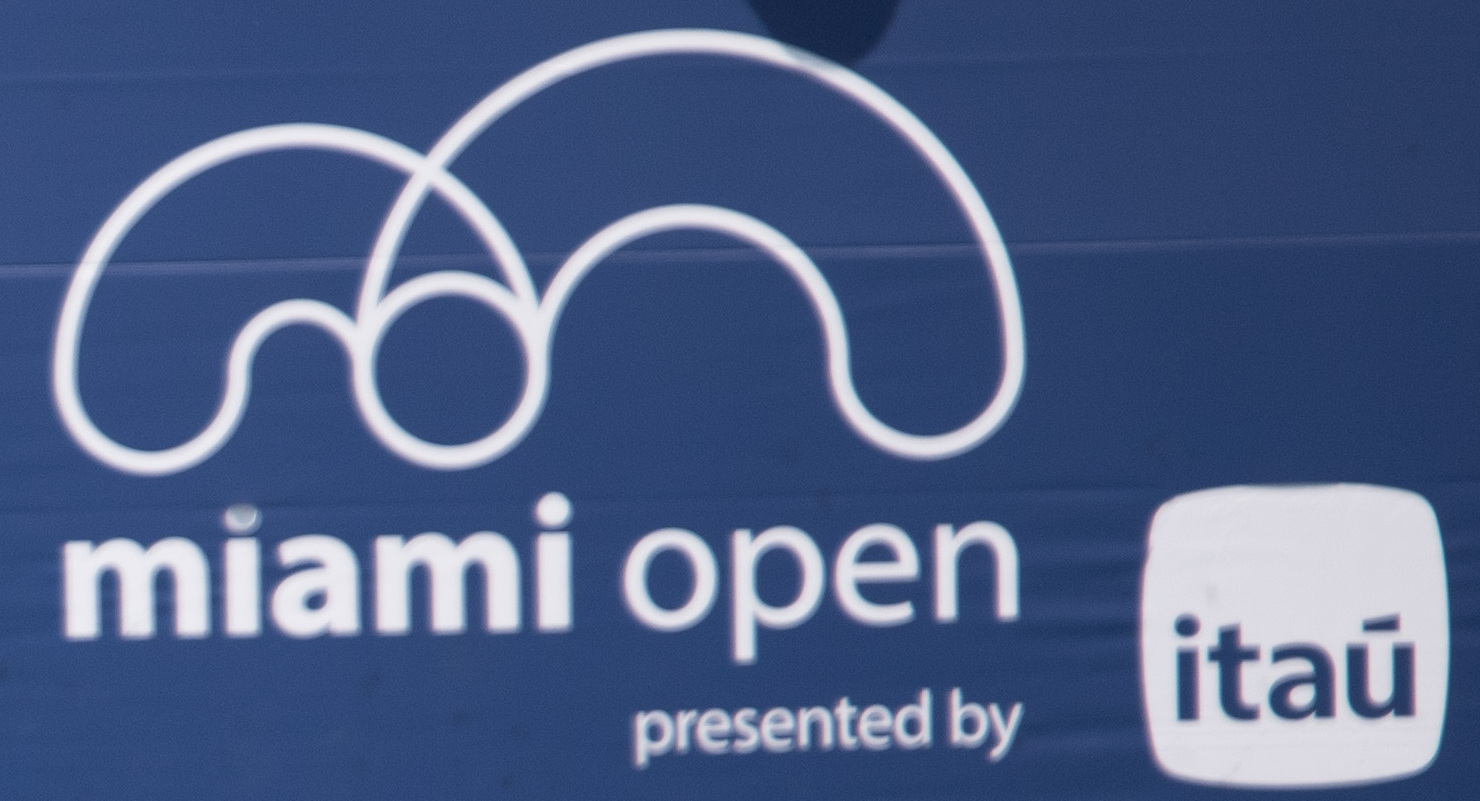

Tournament information
- Founded: 1985; 41 years ago
- Location: Delray Beach, Florida (1985); Boca West, Florida (1986); Key Biscayne, Florida (1987–2018); Miami Gardens, Florida (2019–current)
- Surface: Hard (Laykold) – outdoors
- Website: miamiopen.com

Current champions (2026)
- Men's singles: (Italy) Jannik Sinner
- Women's singles: Aryna Sabalenka
- Men's doubles: (Italy) Simone Bolelli (Italy) Andrea Vavassori
- Women's doubles: (Czech Republic) Kateřina Siniaková (United States) Taylor Townsend
ATP Tour
- Category: Masters 1000
- Draw: 96S / 48Q / 32D
- Prize money: US$ 9,415,725 (2026)
WTA Tour
- Category: WTA 1000
- Draw: 96S / 48Q / 32D
- Prize money: US$ 9,415,725 (2026)

The Miami Open is an annual professional tennis tournament held in Miami Gardens, Florida, United States. It is played on outdoor hardcourts at the Hard Rock Stadium, and is held in late March and early April. The tournament is part of the ATP 1000 events on the ATP Tour and part of the WTA 1000 events on the WTA Tour, and is currently called "Miami Open presented by Itaú" on the official ATP and WTA websites and on its advertising logo since 2015.

The tournament was held at the Tennis Center at Crandon Park in Key Biscayne, Florida, from 1987 through 2018, featuring the top 96 men and women tennis players in the world. It moved to Miami Gardens for 2019. Winning both the Indian Wells Open and Miami Open in the same year is called the "Sunshine Double" — since they are a series of two elite, consecutive hard court tournaments in the United States and are held in Florida (the Sunshine State) and the sunny desert community of Indian Wells.

In 2023, the 12-day tournament was attended by over 386,000 attendees, making it one of the largest tennis tournaments outside the four Grand Slam tournaments. Since 2026 it is also an ITF Wheelchair Tennis Tour tournament in the WT500 level for both men's and women's professional players in singles and doubles draws.

== Tournament names ==
Official

1985–1992; International Players Championships

1993–1999; Miami Open Championships

2000–2008; Miami Masters (for men), Miami Open (for women)

2009–current; Miami Open

Sponsored

1985–1992; Lipton International Players Championships

1993–1999; Lipton Championships

2000–2001; Ericsson Open

2002–2006; NASDAQ-100 Open

2007–2012; Sony Ericsson Open

2013–2014; Sony Open Tennis

2015–present; Miami Open presented by Itaú

== History ==
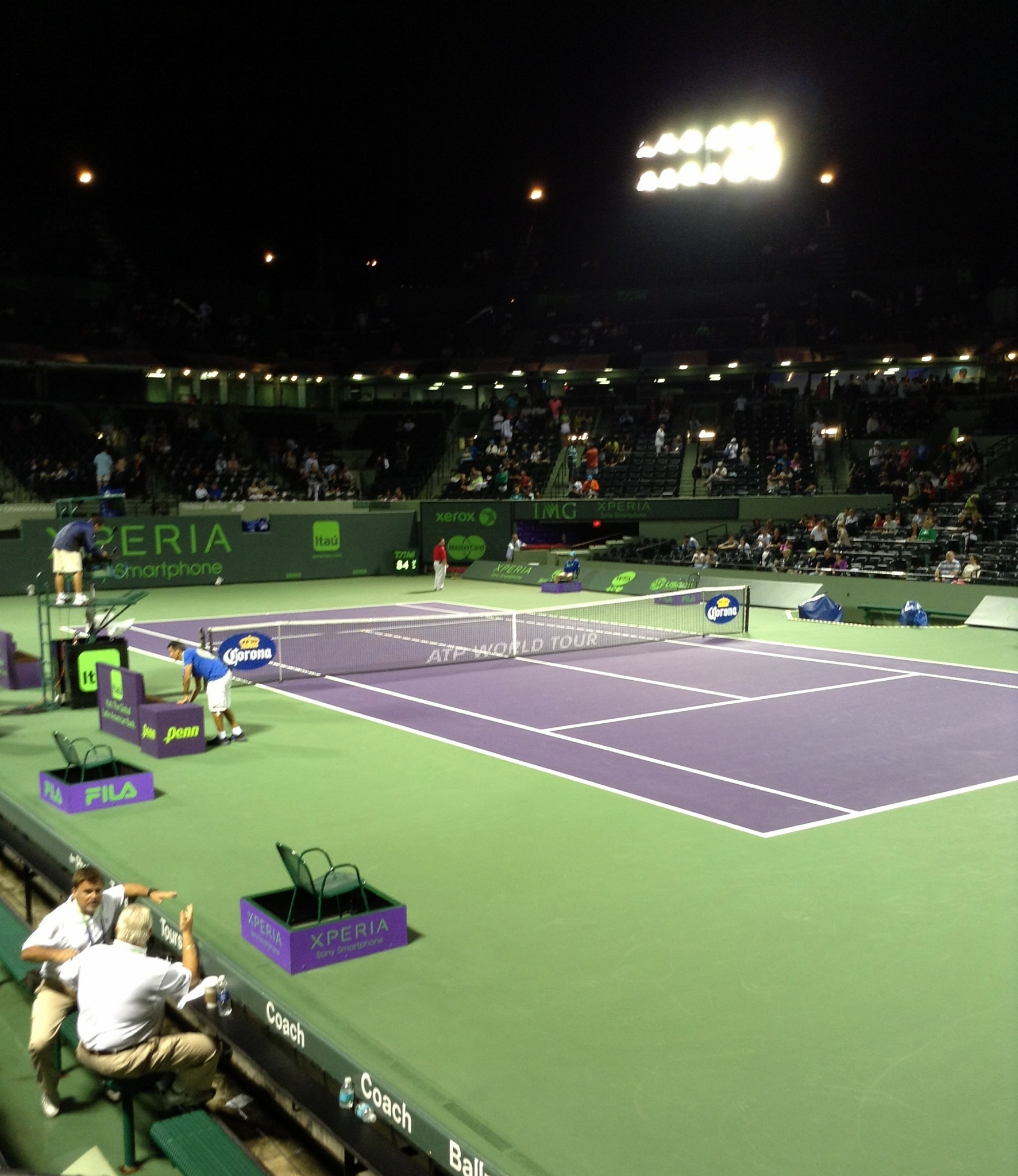
The stadium court at Crandon Park.

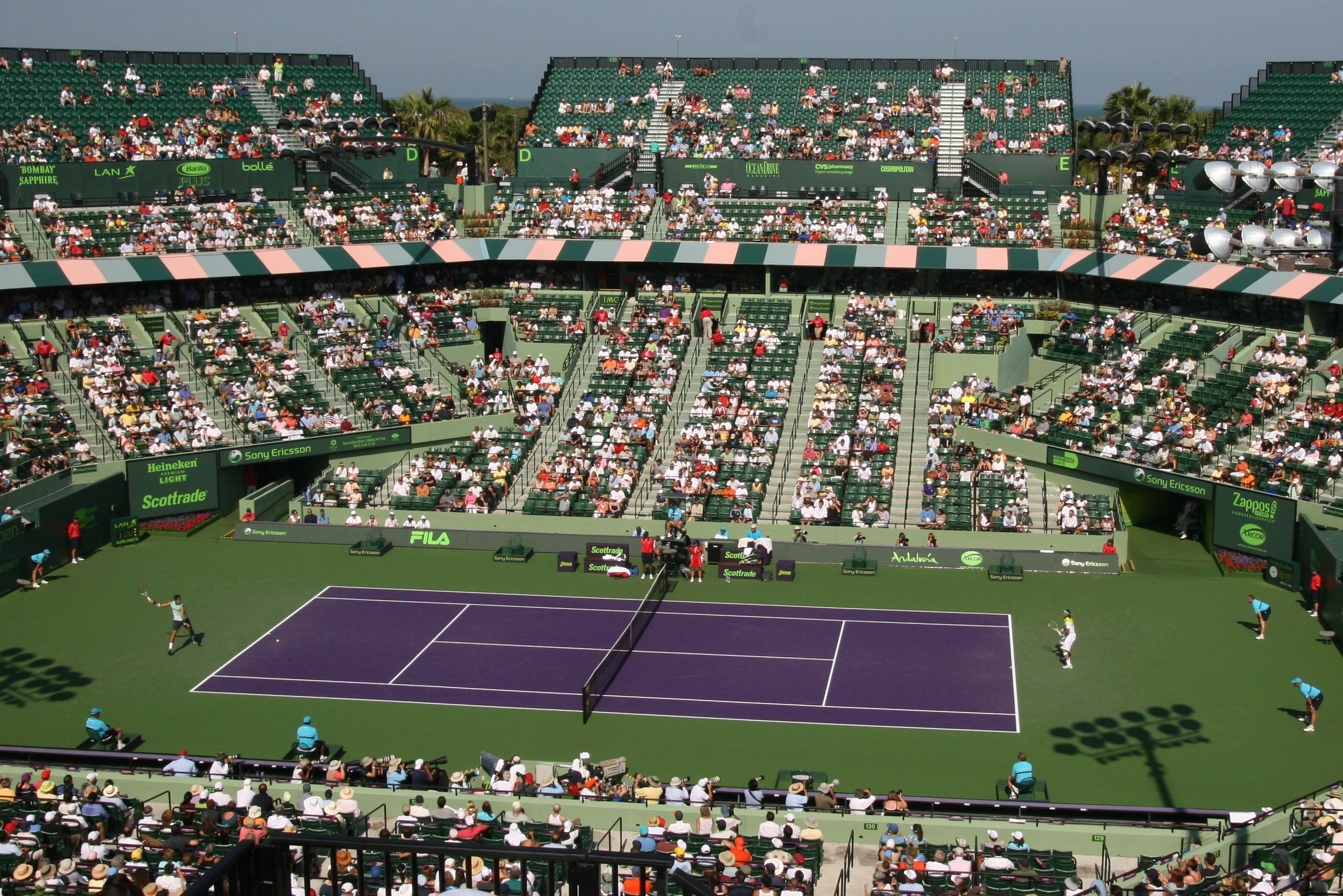
A match between Rafael Nadal and Juan Martín del Potro at Tennis Center at Crandon Park in 2009

The initial idea of holding an international tennis tournament in Miami was born in the 1960s, when famous tennis players such as Pancho Gonzalez, Jack Kramer, Pancho Segura, Frank Sedgman, and Butch Buchholz toured across the country in a station wagon, playing tennis in fairgrounds with portable canvas court. The tournament officially was founded by former player Butch Buchholz who was executive director of the Association of Tennis Professionals (ATP) in the 1980s. His original aim was to make the event the first major tournament of the year (the Australian Open was held in December at that time), and he dubbed it the "Winter Wimbledon". Buchholz approached the ATP and the WTA, offering to provide the prize-money and to give them a percentage of the ticket sales and worldwide television rights in return for the right to run the tournament for 15 years. The two associations agreed.

In 1982 the earlier WCT Gold Coast Cup tournament was played at Delray Beach that was usually held end of January early February. That event ran on the WCT Circuit until 1983 then was stopped. It was played at the Laver International Tennis Resort. This event was succeeded by the International Player's Championships hosted at the same venue and location in 1985.

The first tournament was held in February 1985 at Laver's International Tennis Resort in Delray Beach, Florida. Buchholz brought in Alan Mills, the tournament referee at Wimbledon, as the head referee, and Ted Tinling, a well-known tennis fashion designer since the 1920s, as the director of protocol. At the time, the prize money of US$1.8 million was surpassed only by Wimbledon and the US Open. The event's prize money has since grown to over $13 million.

The event was first sponsored by the Thomas J. Lipton Company under its brand name the Lipton International Players Championships.

In 1986, the tournament was played at Boca West. After its successful year there, Merrett Stierheim, Dade County manager and Women's Tennis Association (WTA) president, helped Buchholz move the tournament to its long-term home in Key Biscayne from 1987. In keeping with ambitions of its founder, the tournament has been maintained as one of the premier events in pro tennis after the Grand Slam tournaments and the ATP World Tour Finals sometimes referred to as the "Fifth major" up until the mid-2000s. In 1999, Buchholz sold the tournament to IMG. In 2004, the Indian Wells Masters also expanded to a multi-week 96 player field, and since then, the two events have been colloquially termed the "Sunshine Double".

The aging Crandon Park facility had been criticized as the slowest hard court on the tour, subjecting players to endless grinding rallies in extreme heat and humidity. The land on which the Crandon Park facility stands had been donated to Miami-Dade County by the Matheson family in 1992 under a stipulation that only one stadium could be built on it. The tournament organizers proposed a $50 million upgrade of Crandon Park that would have added several permanent stadiums, and the family responded with a lawsuit. In 2015, an appeals court ruled in the family's favor, preventing upgrades from being made to the aging complex. The organizers decided not to pursue further legal action and started looking for a new site. In November 2017, the Miami Open signed an agreement with Miami-Dade County to move the annual tournament from the tennis complex in Key Biscayne to Hard Rock Stadium in Miami Gardens, Florida beginning in 2019.

The stadium is primarily used for American football; a modified seating layout with temporary grandstands is used as center court. While it has the same number of seats as the center court at Crandon Park, it also has access to the stadium's luxury seating and suites. New permanent courts were also built on the site's parking lots, including a new grandstand court.

The 2020 Miami Open was postponed to 2021 due to the COVID-19 pandemic; the tournament was held with limited attendance, and Hard Rock Stadium proper was therefore not used.

The tournament has had multiple sponsorships in its history. During its inaugural playing in 1985, the tournament was known as the Lipton International Players Championships and it was a premier event of the Grand Prix Tennis Tour. In 2000, the event was renamed the Ericsson Open and in 2002, the event became known as the NASDAQ-100 Open. In 2007, the tournament was renamed the Sony Ericsson Open. Since 2015, the international bank Itaú has been the presenting sponsor.

== Event characteristics ==
Beside the four major championships, the Miami Open is one of a small number of events on the ATP and WTA Tours where the main singles draw (for both the men and the women) involves more than 64 players, and where main draw play extends beyond one week. 96 men and 96 women compete in the singles competition, and 32 teams compete in each of the doubles competitions with the event lasting 12 days.

In 2006, the tournament became the first event in the United States to use Hawk-Eye to allow players to challenge close line calls. Players were allowed three challenges per set, with an additional challenge allowed for tiebreaks. The first challenge was made by Jamea Jackson against Ashley Harkleroad in the first round.

From 1985 until 1990, from 1996 to 2002, and again from 2004 to 2007, the men's final was held as a best-of-five set match, similar to the Grand Slam events. From 1987 to 1989, the entire tournament, in every round, was best-of-five sets. After 2007, the ATP required that the handful of ATP World Tour Masters 1000 events which had best-of-five finals switch to the usual ATP best-of-three match format because several times the participants in long finals matches ended up withdrawing from tennis tournaments they were scheduled to participate in which were commencing in only two or three days. The last best-of-five set final was won by Novak Djokovic against Guillermo Cañas in 2007.

== Past finals ==
=== Men's singles ===
Year	Champion	Runner-up	Score
↓ Grand Prix circuit ↓
1985	(United States) Tim Mayotte (1/1)	(United States) Scott Davis	4–6, 4–6, 6–3, 6–2, 6–4
1986	(Czechoslovakia) Ivan Lendl (1/2)	(Sweden) Mats Wilander	3–6, 6–1, 7–6^{(7–5)}, 6–4
1987	(Czechoslovakia) Miloslav Mečíř (1/1)	(Czechoslovakia) Ivan Lendl	7–5, 6–2, 7–5
1988	(Sweden) Mats Wilander (1/1)	(United States) Jimmy Connors	6–4, 4–6, 6–4, 6–4
1989	(Czechoslovakia) Ivan Lendl (2/2)	(Austria) Thomas Muster	walkover (Note: In 1989, Thomas Muster withdrew from the final because of a car accident.)
↓ ATP Tour Masters 1000 (Note: Known as Championship Series, Single Week from 1990 till 1995, Super 9 from 1996 till 1999 and Masters Series from 2000 till 2008.) ↓
1990	(United States) Andre Agassi (1/6)	(Sweden) Stefan Edberg	6–1, 6–4, 0–6, 6–2
1991	(United States) Jim Courier (1/1)	(United States) David Wheaton	4–6, 6–3, 6–4
1992	(United States) Michael Chang (1/1)	(Argentina) Alberto Mancini	7–5, 7–5
1993	(United States) Pete Sampras (1/3)	(United States) MaliVai Washington	6–3, 6–2
1994	(United States) Pete Sampras (2/3)	(United States) Andre Agassi	5–7, 6–3, 6–3
1995	(United States) Andre Agassi (2/6)	(United States) Pete Sampras	3–6, 6–2, 7–6^{(7–3)}
1996	(United States) Andre Agassi (3/6)	(Croatia) Goran Ivanišević	3–0 ret. (Note: In 1996, Goran Ivanišević retired from the final due to a stiff neck.)
1997	(Austria) Thomas Muster (1/1)	(Spain) Sergi Bruguera	7–6^{(8–6)}, 6–3, 6–1
1998	(Chile) Marcelo Ríos (1/1)	(United States) Andre Agassi	7–5, 6–3, 6–4
1999	(Netherlands) Richard Krajicek (1/1)	(France) Sébastien Grosjean	4–6, 6–1, 6–2, 7–5
2000	(United States) Pete Sampras (3/3)	(Brazil) Gustavo Kuerten	6–1, 6–7^{(2–7)}, 7–6^{(7–5)}, 7–6^{(10–8)}
2001	(United States) Andre Agassi (4/6)	(United States) Jan-Michael Gambill	7–6^{(7–4)}, 6–1, 6–0
2002	(United States) Andre Agassi (5/6)	(Switzerland) Roger Federer	6–3, 6–3, 3–6, 6–4
2003	(United States) Andre Agassi (6/6)	(Spain) Carlos Moyá	6–3, 6–3
2004	(United States) Andy Roddick (1/2)	(Argentina) Guillermo Coria	6–7^{(2–7)}, 6–3, 6–1, ret. (Note: In 2004, Guillermo Coria retired due to back pain, which later turned out to be kidney stones.)
2005	(Switzerland) Roger Federer (1/4)	(Spain) Rafael Nadal	2–6, 6–7^{(4–7)}, 7–6^{(7–5)}, 6–3, 6–1
2006	(Switzerland) Roger Federer (2/4)	(Croatia) Ivan Ljubičić	7–6^{(7–5)}, 7–6^{(7–4)}, 7–6^{(8–6)}
2007	(Serbia) Novak Djokovic (1/6)	(Argentina) Guillermo Cañas	6–3, 6–2, 6–4
2008	(Russia) Nikolay Davydenko (1/1)	(Spain) Rafael Nadal	6–4, 6–2
2009	(United Kingdom) Andy Murray (1/2)	(Serbia) Novak Djokovic	6–2, 7–5
2010	(United States) Andy Roddick (2/2)	(Czech Republic) Tomáš Berdych	7–5, 6–4
2011	(Serbia) Novak Djokovic (2/6)	(Spain) Rafael Nadal	4–6, 6–3, 7–6^{(7–4)}
2012	(Serbia) Novak Djokovic (3/6)	(United Kingdom) Andy Murray	6–1, 7–6^{(7–4)}
2013	(United Kingdom) Andy Murray (2/2)	(Spain) David Ferrer	2–6, 6–4, 7–6^{(7–1)}
2014	(Serbia) Novak Djokovic (4/6)	(Spain) Rafael Nadal	6–3, 6–3
2015	(Serbia) Novak Djokovic (5/6)	(United Kingdom) Andy Murray	7–6^{(7–3)}, 4–6, 6–0
2016	(Serbia) Novak Djokovic (6/6)	(Japan) Kei Nishikori	6–3, 6–3
2017	(Switzerland) Roger Federer (3/4)	(Spain) Rafael Nadal	6–3, 6–4
2018	(United States) John Isner (1/1)	(Germany) Alexander Zverev	6–7^{(4–7)}, 6–4, 6–4
2019	(Switzerland) Roger Federer (4/4)	(United States) John Isner	6–1, 6–4
2020	cancelled due to the coronavirus pandemic.		
2021	(Poland) Hubert Hurkacz (1/1)	(Italy) Jannik Sinner	7–6^{(7–4)}, 6–4
2022	(Spain) Carlos Alcaraz (1/1)	(Norway) Casper Ruud	7–5, 6–4
2023	Daniil Medvedev (1/1)	(Italy) Jannik Sinner	7–5, 6–3
2024	(Italy) Jannik Sinner (1/2)	(Bulgaria) Grigor Dimitrov	6–3, 6–1
2025	(Czech Republic) Jakub Menšík (1/1)	(Serbia) Novak Djokovic	7–6^{(7–4)}, 7–6^{(7–4)}
2026	(Italy) Jannik Sinner (2/2)	(Czech Republic) Jiří Lehečka	6–4, 6–4

=== Women's singles ===
Year	Champion	Runner-up	Score
↓ Tour Events (Uncategorized) ↓
1985	(United States) Martina Navratilova (1/1)	(United States) Chris Evert	6–2, 6–4
1986	(United States) Chris Evert (1/1)	(West Germany) Steffi Graf	6–4, 6–2
↓ Category 4 ↓
1987	(West Germany) Steffi Graf (1/5)	(United States) Chris Evert	6–1, 6–2
↓ Tier I tournament ↓
1988	(West Germany) Steffi Graf (2/5)	(United States) Chris Evert	6–4, 6–4
1989	(Argentina) Gabriela Sabatini (1/1)	(United States) Chris Evert	6–1, 4–6, 6–2
1990	(Socialist Federal Republic of Yugoslavia) Monica Seles (1/2)	(Austria) Judith Wiesner	6–1, 6–2
1991	(Socialist Federal Republic of Yugoslavia) Monica Seles (2/2)	(Argentina) Gabriela Sabatini	6–3, 7–5
1992	(Spain) Arantxa Sánchez Vicario (1/2)	(Argentina) Gabriela Sabatini	6–1, 6–4
1993	(Spain) Arantxa Sánchez Vicario (2/2)	(Germany) Steffi Graf	6–4, 3–6, 6–3
1994	(Germany) Steffi Graf (3/5)	(Belarus) Natasha Zvereva	4–6, 6–1, 6–2
1995	(Germany) Steffi Graf (4/5)	(Japan) Kimiko Date	6–1, 6–4
1996	(Germany) Steffi Graf (5/5)	(United States) Chanda Rubin	6–1, 6–3
1997	(Switzerland) Martina Hingis (1/2)	(United States) Monica Seles	6–2, 6–1
1998	(United States) Venus Williams (1/3)	(Russia) Anna Kournikova	2–6, 6–4, 6–1
1999	(United States) Venus Williams (2/3)	(United States) Serena Williams	6–1, 4–6, 6–4
2000	(Switzerland) Martina Hingis (2/2)	(United States) Lindsay Davenport	6–3, 6–2
2001	(United States) Venus Williams (3/3)	(United States) Jennifer Capriati	4–6, 6–1, 7–6^{(7–4)}
2002	(United States) Serena Williams (1/8)	(United States) Jennifer Capriati	7–5, 7–6^{(7–4)}
2003	(United States) Serena Williams (2/8)	(United States) Jennifer Capriati	4–6, 6–4, 6–1
2004	(United States) Serena Williams (3/8)	(Russia) Elena Dementieva	6–1, 6–1
2005	(Belgium) Kim Clijsters (1/2)	(Russia) Maria Sharapova	6–3, 7–5
2006	(Russia) Svetlana Kuznetsova (1/1)	(Russia) Maria Sharapova	6–4, 6–3
2007	(United States) Serena Williams (4/8)	(Belgium) Justine Henin	0–6, 7–5, 6–3
2008	(United States) Serena Williams (5/8)	(Serbia) Jelena Janković	6–1, 5–7, 6–3
↓ Premier Mandatory tournament ↓
2009	(Belarus) Victoria Azarenka (1/3)	(United States) Serena Williams	6–3, 6–1
2010	(Belgium) Kim Clijsters (2/2)	(United States) Venus Williams	6–2, 6–1
2011	(Belarus) Victoria Azarenka (2/3)	(Russia) Maria Sharapova	6–1, 6–4
2012	(Poland) Agnieszka Radwańska (1/1)	(Russia) Maria Sharapova	7–5, 6–4
2013	(United States) Serena Williams (6/8)	(Russia) Maria Sharapova	4–6, 6–3, 6–0
2014	(United States) Serena Williams (7/8)	(China) Li Na	7–5, 6–1
2015	(United States) Serena Williams (8/8)	(Spain) Carla Suárez Navarro	6–2, 6–0
2016	(Belarus) Victoria Azarenka (3/3)	(Russia) Svetlana Kuznetsova	6–3, 6–2
2017	(United Kingdom) Johanna Konta (1/1)	(Denmark) Caroline Wozniacki	6–4, 6–3
2018	(United States) Sloane Stephens (1/1)	(Latvia) Jeļena Ostapenko	7–6^{(7–5)}, 6–1
2019	(Australia) Ashleigh Barty (1/2)	(Czech Republic) Karolína Plíšková	7–6^{(7–1)}, 6–3
2020	cancelled due to the coronavirus pandemic.		
↓ WTA 1000 tournament ↓
2021	(Australia) Ashleigh Barty (2/2)	(Canada) Bianca Andreescu	6–3, 4–0 ret.
2022	(Poland) Iga Świątek (1/1)	(Japan) Naomi Osaka	6–4, 6–0
2023	(Czech Republic) Petra Kvitová (1/1)	(Kazakhstan) Elena Rybakina	7–6^{(16–14)}, 6–2
2024	(United States) Danielle Collins (1/1)	(Kazakhstan) Elena Rybakina	7–5, 6–3
2025	Aryna Sabalenka (1/2)	(United States) Jessica Pegula	7–5, 6–2
2026	Aryna Sabalenka (2/2)	(United States) Coco Gauff	6–2, 4–6, 6–3

=== Men's doubles ===
Year	Champions	Runners-up	Score
↓ Grand Prix circuit ↓
1985	(United States) Paul Annacone (South Africa) Christo van Rensburg	(United States) Sherwood Stewart (Australia) Kim Warwick	7–5, 7–5, 6–4
1986	(United States) Brad Gilbert (United States) Vince Van Patten	(Sweden) Stefan Edberg (Sweden) Anders Järryd	walkover
1987	(United States) Paul Annacone (2) (South Africa) Christo van Rensburg (2)	(United States) Ken Flach (United States) Robert Seguso	6–2, 6–4, 6–4
1988	(Australia) John Fitzgerald (Sweden) Anders Järryd	(United States) Ken Flach (United States) Robert Seguso	7–6, 6–1, 7–5
1989	(Switzerland) Jakob Hlasek (Sweden) Anders Järryd (2)	(United States) Jim Grabb (United States) Patrick McEnroe	6–3 (ret.)
↓ ATP Tour Masters 1000 ↓
1990	(United States) Rick Leach (United States) Jim Pugh	(West Germany) Boris Becker (Brazil) Cássio Motta	6–3, 6–4
1991	(South Africa) Wayne Ferreira (South Africa) Piet Norval	(United States) Ken Flach (United States) Robert Seguso	5–7, 7–6, 6–2
1992	(United States) Ken Flach (United States) Todd Witsken	(United States) Kent Kinnear (United States) Sven Salumaa	6–4, 6–3
1993	(Netherlands) Richard Krajicek (Netherlands) Jan Siemerink	(United States) Patrick McEnroe (United States) Jonathan Stark	6–7, 6–4, 7–6
1994	(Netherlands) Jacco Eltingh (Netherlands) Paul Haarhuis	(The Bahamas) Mark Knowles (United States) Jared Palmer	7–6, 7–6
1995	(Australia) Todd Woodbridge (Australia) Mark Woodforde	(United States) Jim Grabb (United States) Patrick McEnroe	6–3, 7–6
1996	(Australia) Todd Woodbridge (2) (Australia) Mark Woodforde (2)	(South Africa) Ellis Ferreira (United States) Patrick Galbraith	6–1, 6–3
1997	(Australia) Todd Woodbridge (3) (Australia) Mark Woodforde (3)	(The Bahamas) Mark Knowles (Canada) Daniel Nestor	7–6, 7–6
1998	(South Africa) Ellis Ferreira (United States) Rick Leach (2)	(United States) Alex O'Brien (United States) Jonathan Stark	6–2, 6–4
1999	(Zimbabwe) Wayne Black (Australia) Sandon Stolle	(Germany) Boris Becker (United States) Jan-Michael Gambill	6–1, 6–1
2000	(Australia) Todd Woodbridge (4) (Australia) Mark Woodforde (4)	(Czech Republic) Martin Damm (Slovakia) Dominik Hrbatý	6–3, 6–4
2001	(Czech Republic) Jiří Novák (Czech Republic) David Rikl	(Sweden) Jonas Björkman (Australia) Todd Woodbridge	7–5, 7–6^{(7–3)}
2002	(The Bahamas) Mark Knowles (Canada) Daniel Nestor	(United States) Donald Johnson (United States) Jared Palmer	6–3, 3–6, 6–1
2003	(Switzerland) Roger Federer (Belarus) Max Mirnyi	(India) Leander Paes (Czech Republic) David Rikl	7–5, 6–3
2004	(Zimbabwe) Wayne Black (2) (Zimbabwe) Kevin Ullyett	(Sweden) Jonas Björkman (Australia) Todd Woodbridge	6–2, 7–6^{(14–12)}
2005	(Sweden) Jonas Björkman (Belarus) Max Mirnyi (2)	(Zimbabwe) Wayne Black (Zimbabwe) Kevin Ullyett	6–1, 6–2
2006	(Sweden) Jonas Björkman (2) (Belarus) Max Mirnyi (3)	(United States) Bob Bryan (United States) Mike Bryan	6–4, 6–4
2007	(United States) Bob Bryan (United States) Mike Bryan	(Czech Republic) Martin Damm (India) Leander Paes	6–7^{(7–9)}, 6–3, [10–7]
2008	(United States) Bob Bryan (2) (United States) Mike Bryan (2)	(India) Mahesh Bhupathi (The Bahamas) Mark Knowles	6–2, 6–2
2009	(Belarus) Max Mirnyi (4) (Israel) Andy Ram	(Australia) Ashley Fisher (Australia) Stephen Huss	6–7^{(4–7)}, 6–2, [10–7]
2010	(Czech Republic) Lukáš Dlouhý (India) Leander Paes	(India) Mahesh Bhupathi (Belarus) Max Mirnyi	6–2, 7–5
2011	(India) Mahesh Bhupathi (India) Leander Paes (2)	(Belarus) Max Mirnyi (Canada) Daniel Nestor	6–7^{(5–7)}, 6–2, [10–5]
2012	(India) Leander Paes (3) (Czech Republic) Radek Štěpánek	(Belarus) Max Mirnyi (Canada) Daniel Nestor	3–6, 6–1, [10–8]
2013	(Pakistan) Aisam-ul-Haq Qureshi (Netherlands) Jean-Julien Rojer	(Poland) Mariusz Fyrstenberg (Poland) Marcin Matkowski	6–4, 6–1
2014	(United States) Bob Bryan (3) (United States) Mike Bryan (3)	(Colombia) Juan Sebastián Cabal (Colombia) Robert Farah Maksoud	7–6^{(10–8)}, 6–4
2015	(United States) Bob Bryan (4) (United States) Mike Bryan (4)	(Canada) Vasek Pospisil (United States) Jack Sock	6–3, 1–6, [10–8]
2016	(France) Pierre-Hugues Herbert (France) Nicolas Mahut	(South Africa) Raven Klaasen (United States) Rajeev Ram	5–7, 6–1, [10–7]
2017	(Poland) Łukasz Kubot (Brazil) Marcelo Melo	(United States) Nicholas Monroe (United States) Jack Sock	7–5, 6–3
2018	(United States) Bob Bryan (5) (United States) Mike Bryan (5)	(Russia) Karen Khachanov (Russia) Andrey Rublev	4–6, 7–6^{(7–5)}, [10–4]
2019	(United States) Bob Bryan (6) (United States) Mike Bryan (6)	(Netherlands) Wesley Koolhof (Greece) Stefanos Tsitsipas	7–5, 7–6^{(10–8)}
2020	cancelled due to the coronavirus pandemic.		
2021	(Croatia) Nikola Mektić (Croatia) Mate Pavić	(United Kingdom) Dan Evans (United Kingdom) Neal Skupski	6–4, 6–4
2022	(Poland) Hubert Hurkacz (United States) John Isner	(Netherlands) Wesley Koolhof (United Kingdom) Neal Skupski	7–6^{(7–5)}, 6–4
2023	(Mexico) Santiago González (France) Édouard Roger-Vasselin	(United States) Austin Krajicek (France) Nicolas Mahut	7–6^{(7–4)}, 7–5
2024	(India) Rohan Bopanna (Australia) Matthew Ebden	(Croatia) Ivan Dodig (United States) Austin Krajicek	6–7^{(3–7)}, 6–3, [10–6]
2025	(El Salvador) Marcelo Arévalo (Croatia) Mate Pavić (2)	(United Kingdom) Julian Cash (United Kingdom) Lloyd Glasspool	7–6^{(7–3)}, 6–3
2026	(Italy) Simone Bolelli (Italy) Andrea Vavassori	(Finland) Harri Heliövaara (United Kingdom) Henry Patten	6–4, 6–2

=== Women's doubles ===
Year	Champions	Runners-up	Score
1985	(United States) Gigi Fernández (United States) Martina Navratilova	(United States) Barbara Jordan (Czechoslovakia) Hana Mandlíková	7–6^{(7–4)}, 6–2
1986	(United States) Pam Shriver (Czechoslovakia) Helena Suková	(United States) Chris Evert (Australia) Wendy Turnbull	6–2, 6–3
1987	(United States) Martina Navratilova (2) (United States) Pam Shriver (2)	(West Germany) Claudia Kohde-Kilsch (Czechoslovakia) Helena Suková	6–3, 7–6^{(8–6)}
↓ Tier I tournament ↓
1988	(West Germany) Steffi Graf (Argentina) Gabriela Sabatini	(United States) Gigi Fernández (United States) Zina Garrison	7–6^{(8–6)}, 6–3
1989	(Czechoslovakia) Jana Novotná (Czechoslovakia) Helena Suková (2)	(United States) Gigi Fernández (United States) Lori McNeil	7–6^{(7–5)}, 6–4
1990	(Czechoslovakia) Jana Novotná (2) (Czechoslovakia) Helena Suková (3)	(United States) Betsy Nagelsen (United States) Robin White	6–4, 6–3
1991	(United States) Mary Joe Fernández (United States) Zina Garrison	(United States) Gigi Fernández (Czechoslovakia) Jana Novotná	7–5, 6–2
1992	(Spain) Arantxa Sánchez Vicario (Latvia) Larisa Savchenko Neiland	(Canada) Jill Hetherington (United States) Kathy Rinaldi	7–5, 5–7, 6–3
1993	(Czech Republic) Jana Novotná (3) (Latvia) Larisa Savchenko Neiland (2)	(Canada) Jill Hetherington (United States) Kathy Rinaldi	6–2, 7–5
1994	(United States) Gigi Fernández (2) (Belarus) Natasha Zvereva	(United States) Patty Fendick (United States) Meredith McGrath	6–3, 6–1
1995	(Czech Republic) Jana Novotná (4) (Spain) Arantxa Sánchez Vicario (2)	(United States) Gigi Fernández (Belarus) Natasha Zvereva	7–5, 2–6, 6–3
1996	(Czech Republic) Jana Novotná (5) (Spain) Arantxa Sánchez Vicario (3)	(United States) Meredith McGrath (Latvia) Larisa Savchenko Neiland	6–4, 6–4
1997	(Spain) Arantxa Sánchez Vicario (4) (Belarus) Natasha Zvereva (2)	(Belgium) Sabine Appelmans (Netherlands) Miriam Oremans	6–4, 6–2
1998	(Switzerland) Martina Hingis (Czech Republic) Jana Novotná (6)	(Spain) Arantxa Sánchez (Belarus) Natasha Zvereva	6–2, 3–6, 6–3
1999	(Switzerland) Martina Hingis (2) (Czech Republic) Jana Novotná (7)	(United States) Mary Joe Fernández (United States) Monica Seles	0–6, 6–4, 7–6^{(7–1)}
2000	(France) Julie Halard-Decugis (Japan) Ai Sugiyama	(United States) Nicole Arendt (Netherlands) Manon Bollegraf	4–6, 7–5, 6–4
2001	(Spain) Arantxa Sánchez-Vicario (5) (France) Nathalie Tauziat	(United States) Lisa Raymond (Australia) Rennae Stubbs	6–0, 6–4
2002	(United States) Lisa Raymond (Australia) Rennae Stubbs	(Spain) Virginia Ruano Pascual (Argentina) Paola Suárez	7–6^{(7–4)}, 6–7^{(4–7)}, 6–3
2003	(South Africa) Liezel Huber (Bulgaria) Magdalena Maleeva	(Japan) Shinobu Asagoe (Japan) Nana Miyagi	6–4, 3–6, 7–5
2004	(Russia) Nadia Petrova (United States) Meghann Shaughnessy	(Russia) Svetlana Kuznetsova (Russia) Elena Likhovtseva	6–2, 6–3
2005	(Russia) Svetlana Kuznetsova (Australia) Alicia Molik	(United States) Lisa Raymond (Australia) Rennae Stubbs	7–5, 6–7^{(5–7)}, 6–2
2006	(United States) Lisa Raymond (2) (Australia) Samantha Stosur	(South Africa) Liezel Huber (United States) Martina Navratilova	6–4, 7–5
2007	(United States) Lisa Raymond (3) (Australia) Samantha Stosur (2)	(Zimbabwe) Cara Black (South Africa) Liezel Huber	6–4, 3–6, [10–2]
2008	(Slovenia) Katarina Srebotnik (Japan) Ai Sugiyama (2)	(Zimbabwe) Cara Black (United States) Liezel Huber	7–5, 4–6, [10–3]
↓ Premier Mandatory tournament ↓
2009	(Russia) Svetlana Kuznetsova (2) (France) Amélie Mauresmo	(Czech Republic) Květa Peschke (United States) Lisa Raymond	4–6, 6–3, [10–3]
2010	(Argentina) Gisela Dulko (Italy) Flavia Pennetta	(Russia) Nadia Petrova (Australia) Samantha Stosur	6–3, 4–6, [10–7]
2011	(Slovakia) Daniela Hantuchová (Poland) Agnieszka Radwańska	(United States) Liezel Huber (Russia) Nadia Petrova	7–6^{(7–5)}, 2–6, [10–8]
2012	(Russia) Maria Kirilenko (Russia) Nadia Petrova (2)	(Italy) Sara Errani (Italy) Roberta Vinci	7–6^{(7–0)}, 4–6, [10–4]
2013	(Russia) Nadia Petrova (3) (Slovenia) Katarina Srebotnik (2)	(United States) Lisa Raymond (United Kingdom) Laura Robson	6–1, 7–6^{(7–2)}
2014	(Switzerland) Martina Hingis (3) (Germany) Sabine Lisicki	(Russia) Ekaterina Makarova (Russia) Elena Vesnina	4–6, 6–4, [10–5]
2015	(Switzerland) Martina Hingis (4) (India) Sania Mirza	(Russia) Ekaterina Makarova (Russia) Elena Vesnina	7–5, 6–1
2016	(United States) Bethanie Mattek-Sands (Czech Republic) Lucie Šafářová	(Hungary) Tímea Babos (Kazakhstan) Yaroslava Shvedova	6–3, 6–4
2017	(Canada) Gabriela Dabrowski (China) Xu Yifan	(India) Sania Mirza (Czech Republic) Barbora Strýcová	6–4, 6–3
2018	(Australia) Ashleigh Barty (United States) CoCo Vandeweghe	(Czech Republic) Barbora Krejčíková (Czech Republic) Kateřina Siniaková	6–2, 6–1
2019	(Belgium) Elise Mertens (Belarus) Aryna Sabalenka	(Australia) Samantha Stosur (China) Zhang Shuai	7–6 ^{(7–5)}, 6–2
2020	cancelled due to the coronavirus pandemic.		
↓ WTA 1000 tournament ↓
2021	(Japan) Shuko Aoyama (Japan) Ena Shibahara	(United States) Hayley Carter (Brazil) Luisa Stefani	6–2, 7–5
2022	(Germany) Laura Siegemund (Note: competed under no flag due to the Russian invasion of Ukraine.) Vera Zvonareva	Veronika Kudermetova (Belgium) Elise Mertens	7–6^{(7–3)}, 7–5
2023	(United States) Coco Gauff (United States) Jessica Pegula	(Canada) Leylah Fernandez (United States) Taylor Townsend	7–6^{(8–6)}, 6–2
2024	(United States) Sofia Kenin (United States) Bethanie Mattek-Sands	(Canada) Gabriela Dabrowski (New Zealand) Erin Routliffe	4–6, 7–6^{(7–5)}, [11–9]
2025	Mirra Andreeva; Diana Shnaider	(Spain) Cristina Bucșa (Japan) Miyu Kato	6–3, 6–7^{(5–7)}, [10–2]
2026	(Czech Republic) Kateřina Siniaková (United States) Taylor Townsend	(Italy) Sara Errani (Italy) Jasmine Paolini	7–6^{(7–0)}, 6–1

=== Mixed doubles ===
Year	Champions	Runners-up	Score
1985	(Switzerland) Heinz Günthardt (United States) Martina Navratilova	(Poland) Wojciech Fibak (Canada) Carling Bassett	6–3, 6–4
1986	(Australia) John Fitzgerald (Australia) Elizabeth Smylie	(Spain) Emilio Sánchez (West Germany) Steffi Graf	6–4, 7–5
1987	(Czechoslovakia) Miloslav Mečíř (Czechoslovakia) Jana Novotná	(South Africa) Christo van Rensburg (South Africa) Elna Reinach	6–3, 3–6, 6–3
1988	(Netherlands) Michiel Schapers (United States) Ann Henricksson	(United States) Jim Pugh (Czechoslovakia) Jana Novotná	6–4, 6–4
1989	(United States) Ken Flach (Canada) Jill Hetherington	(United States) Sherwood Stewart (United States) Zina Garrison	6–2, 7–6^{(7–3)}

== Records ==
	Player(s)	Record	Year(s)
Most singles titles
Men's singles	Andre Agassi (USA)	6	1990, '95–'96, '01–'03
Men's singles	Novak Djokovic (SRB)	6	2007, '11–'12, '14–'16
Women's singles	Serena Williams (USA)	8	2002–04, '07–'08, '13–'15
Most consecutive titles
Men's singles	Andre Agassi (USA)	3	2001–03
Men's singles	Novak Djokovic (SRB)	3	2014–16
Women's singles	Steffi Graf (GER)	3	1994–96
Women's singles	Serena Williams (USA)	3	2002–04; 2013–15
Unseeded winners
Men's singles	Tim Mayotte (USA)	1	1985
Men's singles	Jakub Menšík (CZE)	1	2025
Women's singles	Kim Clijsters (BEL)	1	2005
Women's singles	Danielle Collins (USA)	1	2024
Youngest & oldest winners
Youngest men's singles	Carlos Alcaraz (ESP)	18 years, 333 days old	2022
Youngest women's singles	Monica Seles (YUG)	16 years, 111 days old	1990
Oldest men's singles	Roger Federer (SUI)	37 years, 235 days old	2019
Oldest women's singles	Serena Williams (USA)	33 years, 190 days old	2015
Most finals reached
Men's singles	Andre Agassi (USA)	8	1990, '94–'96, '98, '01–'03
Men's singles	Novak Djokovic (SRB)	8	2007, '09, '11–'12, '14–'16, '25
Women's singles	Serena Williams (USA)	10	1999, '02–'04, '07–'09, '13–'15
Most doubles titles – teams
Men's doubles	Bob Bryan (USA); Mike Bryan (USA)	6	2007–08, '14–'15, '18–'19
Women's doubles	Jana Novotná (CZE); Helena Suková (CZE)	2	1989–90
Women's doubles	Jana Novotná (CZE); Arantxa Sánchez (ESP)	2	1995–96
Women's doubles	Jana Novotná (CZE); Martina Hingis (SUI)	2	1998–99
Women's doubles	Lisa Raymond (USA); Samantha Stosur (AUS)	2	2006–07
Most doubles titles – individual
Men's doubles	Bob Bryan (USA)	6	2007–08, '14–'15, '18–'19
Men's doubles	Mike Bryan (USA)	6	2007–08, '14–'15, '18–'19
Women's doubles	Jana Novotná (CZE)	7	1989–90, '93, '95–'96, '98–'99

== Sunshine Double ==
The Sunshine Double is a feat in tennis achieved when a player wins the titles of the Indian Wells Open and the Miami Open back-to-back.

To date, 13 players have achieved this in singles, and 23 in doubles. Aryna Sabalenka was the first player to win the Sunshine Double in both singles and doubles and the only one since 2026.

=== Men's singles ===
No.	Player	Title(s)	Year(s)
1	(United States) Jim Courier	1	1991
2	(United States) Michael Chang	1	1992
3	(United States) Pete Sampras	1	1994
4	(Chile) Marcelo Ríos	1	1998
5	(United States) Andre Agassi	1	2001
6	(Switzerland) Roger Federer	3	2005–06, '17
7	(Serbia) Novak Djokovic	4	2011, '14–'16
8	(Italy) Jannik Sinner	1	2026

=== Women's singles ===
No.	Player	Title(s)	Year(s)
1	(Germany) Steffi Graf	2	1994, '96
2	(Belgium) Kim Clijsters	1	2005
3	(Belarus) Victoria Azarenka	1	2016
4	(Poland) Iga Świątek	1	2022
5	(Belarus) Aryna Sabalenka	1	2026

=== Men's doubles ===
Teams

No.	Team	Title	Year
1	(Australia) Todd Woodbridge (Australia) Mark Woodforde	1	1996
2	(Zimbabwe) Wayne Black (Australia) Sandon Stolle	1	1999
3	(The Bahamas) Mark Knowles (Canada) Daniel Nestor	1	2002
4	(United States) Bob Bryan (United States) Mike Bryan	1	2014
5	(France) Pierre-Hugues Herbert (France) Nicolas Mahut	1	2016
6	(El Salvador) Marcelo Arévalo (Croatia) Mate Pavić	1	2025

Individuals

These players won the Indian Wells Open and the Miami Open in the same year but with different partners.

No.	Player (individually)	Title	Year
1	(Switzerland) Jakob Hlasek	1	1989
2	(United States) John Isner	1	2022

=== Women's doubles ===
Teams

No.	Team	Title(s)	Year(s)
1	(Czech Republic) Jana Novotná (Czech Republic) Helena Suková	1	1990
2	(United States) Lisa Raymond (Australia) Rennae Stubbs	1	2002
3	(United States) Lisa Raymond (Australia) Samantha Stosur	2	2006–07
4	(Switzerland) Martina Hingis (India) Sania Mirza	1	2015
5	(Belgium) Elise Mertens (Belarus) Aryna Sabalenka	1	2019
6	(Czech Republic) Kateřina Siniaková (United States) Taylor Townsend	1	2026

Individuals

These players won the Indian Wells Open and the Miami Open in the same year but with different partners.

No.	Player (individually)	Title	Year
1	(Belarus) Natasha Zvereva	1	1997
2	(Switzerland) Martina Hingis	1	1999
3	(United States) Bethanie Mattek-Sands	1	2016

== Notes ==
Awards and achievements
Preceded by None; San Diego	Favorite WTA Tier I – II Tournament; 1995; 2004	Succeeded by Indian Wells; Moscow
Preceded by Indianapolis	ATP Tournament of the Year; 1998–2000	Succeeded by None
Preceded by Monte-Carlo; Monte-Carlo	ATP Masters Series Tournament of the Year; 2002–2006; 2008	Succeeded by Monte-Carlo; Shanghai
