= 1981 Seiko World Super Tennis – Doubles =

Doubles
- 1981 Seiko World Super Tennis

Final
- Champions: (United States) Victor Amaya (United States) Hank Pfister
- Runners-up: (Switzerland) Heinz Günthardt (Hungary) Balázs Taróczy
- Score: 6–4, 6–2

Details
- Draw: 16
- Seeds: 4

Events
| Singles | Doubles |
- Tokyo Indoor

Victor Amaya and Hank Pfister were the defending champions.

Amaya and Pfister successfully defended their title, defeating Heinz Günthardt and Balázs Taróczy 6–4, 6–2 in the final.

== Seeds ==
1. (United States) John McEnroe / (United States) Ferdi Taygan (quarterfinals)
2. (Switzerland) Heinz Günthardt / (Hungary) Balázs Taróczy (final)
3. (Australia) Mark Edmondson / (United States) Sherwood Stewart (semifinals)
4. (United States) Bruce Manson / (United States) Van Winitsky (first round)

== Draw ==
Key

- Q = Qualifier
- WC = Wild card
- LL = Lucky loser
- Alt = Alternate
- ITF = ITF entry
- PR = Protected ranking
- SR = Special ranking
- SE = Special exempt
- JE = Junior exempt
- JR = Junior Accelerator Programme entrant
- CO = College Accelerator Programme entrant
- NG = Next Gen Accelerator Program entrant
- w/o = Walkover
- r = Retired
- d = Defaulted

=== Draw ===
First round
1 | (United States) J McEnroe (United States) F Taygan | 7 | 6
(United States) M Estep (Australia) J Fitzgerald | 5 | 3
(United States) V Amaya (United States) H Pfister | 7^{7} | 6
(United States) T Moor (United States) E Teltscher | 6^{1} | 4
3 | (Australia) M Edmondson (United States) S Stewart | 7 | 7^{7}
(Argentina) R Cano (Argentina) J-L Clerc | 5 | 6^{5}
(United States) P Du Pré (United Kingdom) B Mottram | 6 | 6
(Japan) T Fukui (Japan) T Yonezawa | 3 | 4
(United States) Ti Gullikson (United States) To Gullikson | 7^{7} | 7^{7}
(United States) L Stefanki (United States) R Van't Hof | 6^{4} | 6^{3}
(Australia) P McNamee (United States) B Scanlon | 6 | 6
4 | (United States) B Manson (United States) V Winitsky | 4 | 4
(United States) C Dunk (Poland) W Fibak | 6 | 7^{8}
(Australia) R Frawley (New Zealand) C Lewis | 3 | 6^{6}
(United States) M Purcell (United States) P Rennert | 2 | 3
2 | (Switzerland) H Günthardt (Hungary) B Taróczy | 6 | 6

Quarterfinals
1 | (United States) J McEnroe (United States) F Taygan | 7 | 5 | 4
(United States) V Amaya (United States) H Pfister | 6 | 7 | 6
3 | (Australia) M Edmondson (United States) S Stewart | 6 | 6
(United States) P Du Pré (United Kingdom) B Mottram | 4 | 2
(United States) Ti Gullikson (United States) To Gullikson | w/o
(Australia) P McNamee (United States) B Scanlon
(United States) C Dunk (Poland) W Fibak | 5 | 7^{7} | 3
2 | (Switzerland) H Günthardt (Hungary) B Taróczy | 7 | 6^{1} | 6

Semifinals
(United States) V Amaya (United States) H Pfister | 6 | 3 | 7^{7}
3 | (Australia) M Edmondson (United States) S Stewart | 3 | 6 | 6^{2}
(United States) Ti Gullikson (United States) To Gullikson | 6 | 1 | 4
2 | (Switzerland) H Günthardt (Hungary) B Taróczy | 4 | 6 | 6

Final
(United States) V Amaya (United States) H Pfister | 6 | 6
2 | (Switzerland) H Günthardt (Hungary) B Taróczy | 4 | 2
