= 1981 Seiko World Super Tennis – Singles =

Singles
- 1981 Seiko World Super Tennis

Final
- Champion: (United States) Vincent Van Patten
- Runner-up: (Australia) Mark Edmondson
- Score: 6–2, 3–6, 6–3

Details
- Draw: 32
- Seeds: 8

Events
Singles	Doubles
- Tokyo Indoor

Jimmy Connors was the defending champion, but did not participate this year.

Unseeded Vincent Van Patten won the tournament, beating Mark Edmondson in the final, 6–2, 3–6, 6–3.

== Seeds ==
1. (United States) John McEnroe (semifinals)
2. (Sweden) Björn Borg (second round)
3. (Argentina) José Luis Clerc (second round)
4. (United States) Eliot Teltscher (first round)
5. (United States) Vitas Gerulaitis (quarterfinals)
6. (Poland) Wojtek Fibak (quarterfinals)
7. N/A
8. (Hungary) Balázs Taróczy (first round)

== Draw ==
Key

- Q = Qualifier
- WC = Wild card
- LL = Lucky loser
- Alt = Alternate
- ITF = ITF entry
- PR = Protected ranking
- SR = Special ranking
- SE = Special exempt
- JE = Junior exempt
- JR = Junior Accelerator Programme entrant
- CO = College Accelerator Programme entrant
- NG = Next Gen Accelerator Program entrant
- w/o = Walkover
- r = Retired
- d = Defaulted

=== Finals ===
Semifinals
1	(United States) John McEnroe	3	5
(United States) Vincent Van Patten	6	7
(Australia) Mark Edmondson	7^{7}	6
(Switzerland) Heinz Günthardt	6^{4}	4

Final
(United States) Vincent Van Patten	6	3	6
(Australia) Mark Edmondson	2	6	3

=== Top half ===
First round
1	(United States) J McEnroe	6	6
(United States) J Sadri	2	2
(Japan) T Fukui	6	6
(Japan) S Shiraishi	4	2
(United States) B Scanlon	6	6
(Argentina) R Cano	1	4
(United States) D Gitlin	2	7^{7}	5
LL	(United States) C Dunk	6	6^{3}	7
3	(Argentina) J-L Clerc	6	6
(Australia) P McNamee	2	4
(United States) V Van Patten	6	6
(Australia) J Fitzgerald	2	4
(New Zealand) C Lewis	6	7
(United States) T Moor	4	5
(United States) J Bailey	4	7	1
5	(United States) V Gerulaitis	6	5	6

Second round
1	(United States) J McEnroe	6	6
(Japan) T Fukui	3	2
(United States) B Scanlon	6	4	6
LL	(United States) C Dunk	2	6	1
3	(Argentina) J-L Clerc	7^{7}	5	6^{5}
(United States) V Van Patten	6^{4}	7	7^{7}
(New Zealand) C Lewis	2	3
5	(United States) V Gerulaitis	6	6

Quarterfinals
1	(United States) J McEnroe	6	6
(United States) B Scanlon	4	3
(United States) V Van Patten	0	6	6
5	(United States) V Gerulaitis	6	3	3

Semifinals
1	(United States) J McEnroe	3	5
(United States) V Van Patten	6	7

=== Bottom half ===
First round
6	(Poland) W Fibak	7^{7}	3	6
(United States) M Purcell	6^{3}	6	3
(United States) V Amaya	3	6	6^{7}
(Australia) P Dent	6	2	7^{9}
(United States) To Gullikson	4	7	1
(Australia) M Edmondson	6	5	6
(United States) B Manson	6	6
4	(United States) E Teltscher	3	3
8	(Hungary) B Taróczy	6	3	4
(Switzerland) H Günthardt	4	6	6
(Australia) R Frawley	6	3	4
(United States) P Rennert	4	6	6
(Japan) E Takeuchi	1	2
(United States) Ti Gullikson	6	6
(India) R Krishnan	3	6	2
2	(Sweden) B Borg	6	4	6

Second round
6	(Poland) W Fibak	6	6
(Australia) P Dent	4	3
(Australia) M Edmondson	6^{6}	6	6
(United States) B Manson	7^{8}	4	4
(Switzerland) H Günthardt	7	6
(United States) P Rennert	5	3
(United States) Ti Gullikson	6	6
2	(Sweden) B Borg	3	1

Quarterfinals
6	(Poland) W Fibak	5	2
(Australia) M Edmondson	7	6
(Switzerland) H Günthardt	7^{7}	7^{7}
(United States) Ti Gullikson	6^{3}	6^{2}

Semifinals
(Australia) M Edmondson	7^{7}	6
(Switzerland) H Günthardt	6^{4}	4
