= Vincent Van Patten =

American actor, tennis player (born 1957)

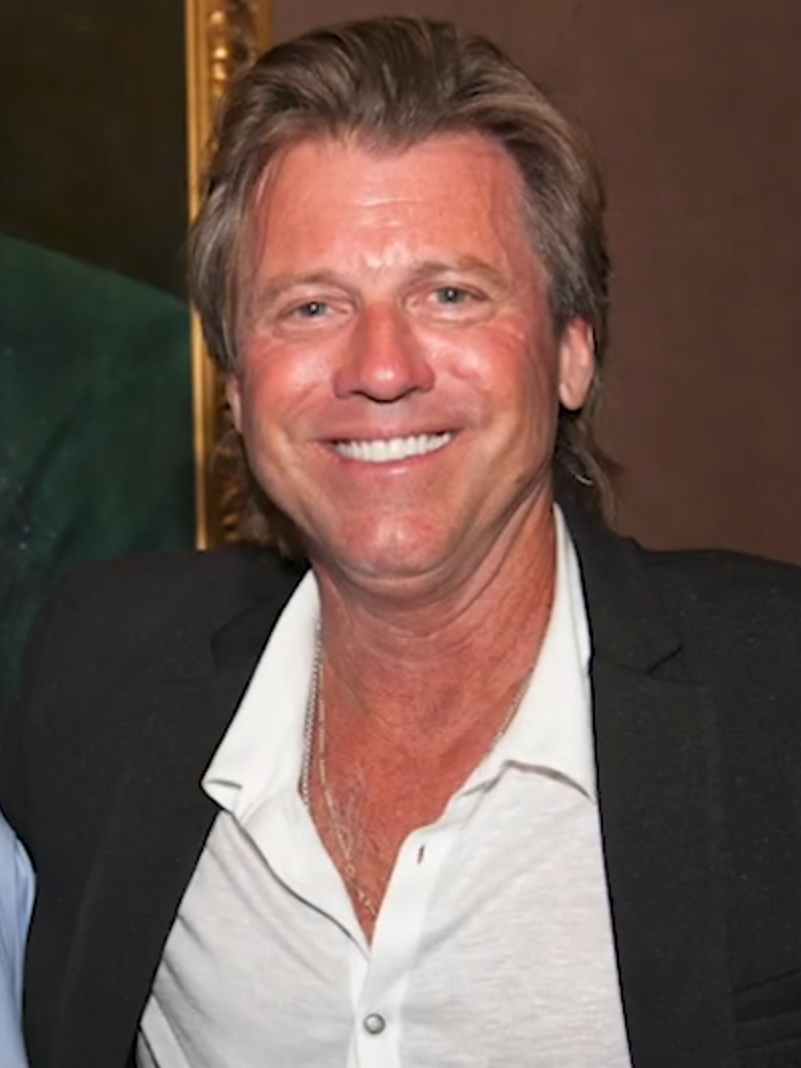
- Vincent Van Patten in 2017
- Born: October 17, 1957 (age 69); Bellerose, New York, U.S.
- Occupations: Actor, tennis player, commentator for the ClubWPT
- Years active: 1960–present
- Spouses: Betsy Russell (m. 1989; div. 2001) Eileen Davidson (m. 2003)
- Children: 3
- Father: Dick Van Patten
- Relatives: Nels Van Patten (brother); James Van Patten (brother); Joyce Van Patten (aunt); Tim Van Patten (uncle); Talia Balsam (cousin); Grace Van Patten (cousin); Anna Van Patten (cousin)
- Tennis career
- Height: 5 ft 11 in (1.80 m)
- Turned pro: 1978
- Retired: 1987
- Plays: Right-handed
- Prize money: $433,522

Singles
- Career record: 109–116
- Career titles: 1
- Highest ranking: No. 26 (November 2, 1981)

Grand Slam singles results
- French Open: 1R (1981, 1985)
- Wimbledon: 3R (1985)
- US Open: 3R (1982, 1983)

Doubles
- Career record: 43–72
- Career titles: 1
- Highest ranking: No. 24 (September 15, 1986)

Grand Slam doubles results
- French Open: QF (1981)
- Wimbledon: 3R (1984)

Vincent Van Patten (born October 17, 1957) is an American actor, former professional tennis player, and the commentator for the World Poker Tour.

== Early and personal life ==
Van Patten was born in Bellerose, New York, as the youngest son of actor Dick Van Patten and his wife, Patricia Helon "Pat" Van Patten (née Poole), a former June Taylor dancer. He is of Dutch, English, and Italian descent.

He was first urged into show business at age nine by his father's agent. He appeared in more than thirty commercials, including Colgate toothpaste, before his father was cast in the TV series, Arnie, and moved his family from Long Island to Los Angeles.

From his first marriage to Betsy Russell he has two sons: Richard and Vince. His second marriage, on April 15, 2003, was to The Young and the Restless actress Eileen Davidson; they have one child together, a son named Jesse Thomas Van Patten.

Vince is related to several other well-known actors, actresses, and singers through blood and by marriage. Vince is a brother of James and Nels Van Patten, a nephew of Joyce Van Patten and Timothy Van Patten, and a cousin of Talia Balsam.

== Acting ==
As a child actor during the 1970s, Van Patten guest-starred in over three dozen classic television series, including Bonanza, Gunsmoke, The High Chaparral, Nichols, Medical Center, Adam-12, The Courtship of Eddie's Father, ‘’Night Gallery’’, Wonder Woman, and a variety of television movies. He also had roles in the films Charley and the Angel (1973) and Chino (1973). At age 16, he was cast in Apple's Way, a CBS drama series, in which he played the son of an architect who leaves the big city to rear his family in rural and fictional Appleton, Iowa.

In the fall of 1975, at age 18, Van Patten appeared as John Karras in a 12-week CBS drama series Three for the Road. In 1976, he co-starred in The Bionic Boy, a two-hour ABC attempted spinoff of the popular Lee Majors vehicle The Six Million Dollar Man, that never went to series. He made a guest appearance in the final episode of the NBC television anthology series $weepstake$ in 1979.

In 1978, Van Patten starred in the cult film classic Rock 'n' Roll High School. He starred in several other films in the 1970s and 1980s, including the 1979 action thriller Survival Run (aka Spree), Yesterday (1981) as a Vietnam war veteran, the slasher film Hell Night (1981), Gidget's Summer Reunion (1985), The Dirty Dozen: The Deadly Mission (1987), and Camp Fear (1991). He wrote, produced, and starred in The Break (1995), distributed by Lions Gate with Martin Sheen. Van Patten co-wrote and produced 7 Days to Vegas (2019), based on a true story, about a bet he made in 1995 that he could walk 280 miles (450 km) from Los Angeles, California, to Las Vegas, Nevada, in seven days.

=== Films ===
Year	Title	Role	Notes
1970	Dial Hot Line	Stevie	Television movie
1972	The Bravos	Peter Harkness	Television movie
1973	Charley and the Angel	Willie Appleby	
1973	Chino	Jamie Wagner	
1978	Rooster: Spurs of Death!	Wyatt	
1979	Rock 'n' Roll High School	Tom Roberts	
1979	Survival Run	Chip	
1981	Yesterday	Matt Kramer	
1981	Hell Night	Seth	
1985	Gidget's Summer Reunion	Mickey	Television movie
1987	The Dirty Dozen: The Deadly Mission	Ronnie Webber	Television movie
1990	Payback	Terry Cartwright	
1991	Camp Fear	Professor Hamilton	
1995	The Break	Nick Irons	
2000	Backyard Dogs	ZZ Nash	
2001	When Billie Beat Bobby	Lornie Kuhle	Television movie
2003	High Roller: The Stu Ungar Story	Jimmy D.	
2016	The Guest House	Abe	
2019	7 Days to Vegas	Duke	also co-screenwriter and co-producer

=== Television ===
Year	Title	Role	Notes
1970	The High Chaparral	Culley Broxton	Episode: "Spokes"
1970	Bracken's World	Pete O'Connell	Episode: "Nude Scene"
1970	The Interns	Young Samuel	Episode: "Dancy"
1970	Nanny and the Professor	Tommy	Episode: "The Humanization of Herbert T. Peabody"
1970–1972	Bonanza	Tommy Brenner / Tim Griffin	2 episodes
1970–1973	Medical Center	Kenny / Jimmy / Benjy	3 episodes
1971	Ironside	Sonny Brokaw	Episode: "The Target"
1971	The Courtship of Eddie's Father	Mark	Episode: "To Catch a Thief"
1971	The Bill Cosby Show	Jimmy	Episode: "The Saturday Game"
1971	Cannon	Shaun Donaldson	Episode: "The Salinas Jackpot"
1971	Marcus Welby, M.D.	Philip Grand	Episode: "This Is Max"
1971	Adam-12	Virgil Stephens	Episode: "Truant"
1971	Night Gallery	Chris	Segment: "Big Surprise"
1972	Nichols	Grover	Episode: "About Jesse James"
1972	The Partners	Roger Higgenbottom	Episode: "Headlines for Higgenbottom"
1972	ABC Afterschool Special	Mark	voice, Episode: "The Last of the Curlews"
1972	The New Scooby-Doo Movies	Additional roles	voice, 16 episodes
1972–1973	The Magical World of Disney	Todd Thompson; Davey	4 episodes
1972–1973	Gunsmoke	Colby Eaton; Heck Walden	Episode: "Bohannan"; Episode: "The Boy and the Sinner"
1973	Barnaby Jones	Kevin Mills	Episode: "Day of the Viper"
1973	Jeannie	Billy	voice, Episode: "The Kid Brother"
1973	Love, American Style	Bobby	Segment: "Love and Carmen Lopez"
1973	Dirty Sally	George	Episode: "The Orphans"
1974–1975	Apple's Way	Paul Apple	Main role; 28 episodes
1975	Three for the Road	John Karras	Main role; 13 episodes
1976	Phyllis	Rob	Episode: "Crazy Mama"
1976	The Six Million Dollar Man	Andy Sheffield	Episode: "The Bionic Boy"
1977	James at 16	Rip Lindeman	Episode: "Pilot"
1977	Wonder Woman	Johnny	2 episodes
1977	Captain Caveman and the Teen Angels	Additional roles	Episode: "The Mystery Mansion Mix-Up"
1978	What Really Happened to the Class of '65?	Phil	Episode: "The Most Likely to Succeed"
1978	Flying High	Unknown role	Episode: "Palm Springs Weekend"
1978–1979	Insight	Morgan / Rick Adams	2 episodes
1979	How the West Was Won	Bob Cooper	Episode: "The Rustler"
1981	The Love Boat	Frank	1 episode
1990	Matlock	Dave Travis	Episode: "The Pro"
1992	Baby Talk	Elliot	Episode: "Requiem for a Lightweight"
1992–1997	Baywatch	Vincent / Dr. Tom Morella	6 episodes
2000	The Young and the Restless	Christian Page	12 episodes
2006	Cuts	Himself as Vincent Van Patten	Episode: "Rogue Trip"
2022	Days of Our Lives: Beyond Salem	Phil Hellworth	2 episodes

== Tennis career ==
Van Patten was a professional tour tennis player who in 1979 was awarded the Association of Tennis Professionals (ATP) Rookie of the Year award. The highlight of his career came in October 1981 when he defeated top ten world ranked pros José Luis Clerc, Vitas Gerulaitis and top-seeded John McEnroe to win the Seiko World Super Tennis tournament in Tokyo. His career high ranking in singles was world No. 26, reached on February 11, 1982.

In singles, Van Patten reached the third round of the US Open twice, in 1982 and 1983, and Wimbledon once, in 1985. In doubles his best Grand Slam event result was reaching the quarter-finals of the French Open in 1981, partnering with Mel Purcell. His highest doubles ranking was world No. 24, reached in September 1986.

=== Finals ===
==== Singles (1 win / 2 losses) ====
Result	W/L	Date	Tournament	Surface	Opponent	Score
Loss	0–1	May 1980	São Paulo, Brazil	Carpet	(Poland) Wojciech Fibak	0–6, 6–7
Win	1–1	Oct 1981	Tokyo, Japan	Carpet	(Australia) Mark Edmondson	6–2, 3–6, 6–3
Loss	1–2	Oct 1983	Maui, US	Hard	(United States) Scott Davis	3–6, 7–6^{(7–2)}, 6–7^{(4–7)}

==== Doubles (1 win / 1 loss) ====
Result	W/L	Date	Tournament	Surface	Partner	Opponents	Score
Loss	0–1	Sep 1983	San Francisco, US	Carpet (i)	(Czechoslovakia) Ivan Lendl	(United States) Peter Fleming (United States) John McEnroe	1–6, 2–6
Win	1–1	Feb 1986	Miami, US	Hard	(United States) Brad Gilbert	(Sweden) Stefan Edberg (Sweden) Anders Järryd	walkover

== Poker ==
Van Patten learned to play poker at the age of 14 from his father, actor Dick Van Patten.

In the 1990s, Vincent Van Patten put together his own Hollywood home game with famous regulars like Ben Affleck and Tobey Maguire.

He finished in the money at the 2010 World Series of Poker Main Event, finishing 481st in a pool of 7,319 entrants and received winnings totaling $27,519. (This amount was awarded to finishers in 460th through 531st place.)

Since 2003, he has been a commentator on World Poker Tour. The first four seasons were broadcast on Travel Channel; seasons five and six on Game Show Network, and, from the seventh through to the current season, it has aired on Fox Sports Networks.

With Robert J Randisi, he wrote The Picasso Flop, a novel about Las Vegas poker.

As of September 2020, Van Patten has $104,383 in live tournament earnings from seven events.

== Bibliography ==
- Holmstrom, John (January 1, 1999). The Moving Picture Boy: An International Encyclopaedia from 1895 to 1995 (second ed.). Norwich: Michael Russell. p. 319. ISBN 978-0859551786.
