= 1989 BP National Championships =

- Date: 2–8 January
- Edition: 2nd
- Category: Grand Prix
- Draw: 32S / 16D
- Prize money: $115,000
- Surface: Hard / outdoor
- Location: Wellington, New Zealand

Champions

Singles
- (New Zealand) Kelly Evernden

Doubles
- (Australia) Peter Doohan / (Australia) Laurie Warder
- BP National Championships

The 1989 BP National Championships was a men's tennis tournament played on outdoor hard courts in Wellington, New Zealand and was part of the 1989 Nabisco Grand Prix. It was the 2nd edition of the tournament and was held from 2 January through 8 January 1989. Eighth-seeded Kelly Evernden won the singles title.

== Finals ==
=== Singles ===
(New Zealand) Kelly Evernden defeated (Japan) Shuzo Matsuoka 7–5, 6–1, 6–4

- It was Evernden's 1st singles title of the year and the 3rd of his career.

=== Doubles ===
(Australia) 'Peter Doohan / (Australia) Laurie Warder defeated (United States) Rill Baxter / (Canada) Glenn Michibata 3–6, 6–2, 6–3

- It was Doohan's only title of the year and the 6th of his career. It was Warder's only title of the year and the 6th of his career.

== See also ==
- 1989 Fernleaf Classic – women's tournament
