= 1990 BP National Championships =

- Date: 1–7 January
- Edition: 3rd
- Category: World Series
- Draw: 32S / 16D
- Prize money: $125,000
- Surface: Hard / outdoor
- Location: Wellington, New Zealand

Champions

Singles
- (Spain) Emilio Sánchez

Doubles
- (New Zealand) Kelly Evernden / (Venezuela) Nicolás Pereira
- BP National Championships

The 1990 BP National Championships was a men's tennis tournament played on outdoor hard courts in Wellington in New Zealand and was part of the World Series of the 1990 ATP Tour. It was the third edition of the tournament and ran from 1 January through 7 January 1990. First-seeded Emilio Sánchez won the singles title.

== Finals ==
=== Singles ===
(Spain) Emilio Sánchez defeated (United States) Richey Reneberg 6–7^{(3–7)}, 6–4, 4–6, 6–4, 6–1

- It was Sánchez's 1st title of the year and the 37th of his career.

=== Doubles ===
(New Zealand) Kelly Evernden / (Venezuela) Nicolás Pereira defeated (Spain) Sergio Casal / (Spain) Emilio Sánchez 6–4, 7–6

- It was Evernden's only title of the year and the 8th of his career. It was Pereira's only title of the year and the 1st of his career.

== See also ==
- 1990 Fernleaf International Classic – women's tournament
