= 1990 BP National Championships – Doubles =

Doubles
- 1990 BP National Championships
- 1989 Champions: (Australia) Peter Doohan (Australia) Laurie Warder

Final
- Champions: (New Zealand) Kelly Evernden (Venezuela) Nicolás Pereira
- Runners-up: (Spain) Sergio Casal (Spain) Emilio Sánchez
- Score: 6–4, 7–6

Details
- Draw: 16
- Seeds: 4

Events
Singles	Doubles
← 1989 ·	BP National Championships	· 1991 →

The 1990 BP National Championships was an ATP tennis tournament played in Wellington in New Zealand.

Peter Doohan and Laurie Warder were the defending doubles champions, but only Warder competed that year, with Tim Pawsat.

Pawsat and Warder lost in the semifinals to Kelly Evernden and Nicolás Pereira.

Evernden and Pereira won in the final 6–4, 7–6 against Sergio Casal and Emilio Sánchez.

== Seeds ==
Champion seeds are indicated in bold text while text in italics indicates the round in which those seeds were eliminated.

1. (United States) Tim Pawsat / (Australia) Laurie Warder (semifinals)
2. (Spain) Sergio Casal / (Spain) Emilio Sánchez (final)
3. (Canada) Grant Connell / (Canada) Glenn Michibata (first round)
4. (United States) Paul Chamberlin / (United States) Tim Wilkison (first round)

== Draw ==
=== Key ===
- Q = Qualifier
- WC = Wild card
- LL = Lucky loser
- Alt = Alternate
- SE = Special exempt
- PR = Protected ranking
- ITF = ITF entry
- JE = Junior exempt
- w/o = Walkover
- r = Retired
- d = Defaulted
- SR = Special ranking

First round
1	(United States) **T Pawsat** (Australia) **L Warder**	**6**	**7**
(Czechoslovakia) K Nováček (Czechoslovakia) C Suk	4	6
Q	(Sweden) V Jansson (Sweden) N Utgren	2	5
(United States) **T Nelson** (The Bahamas) **R Smith**	**6**	**7**
3	(Canada) G Connell (Canada) G Michibata	**6**	3	4
(United States) **L Jensen** (United States) **R Reneberg**	4	**6**	**6**
(New Zealand) **K Evernden** (Venezuela) **N Pereira**	**7**	4	**6**
(United States) P Galbraith (United States) G Van Emburgh	6	**6**	3
(West Germany) P Ballauff (West Germany) R Osterthun	1	4
(United States) **R Van't Hof** (Kenya) **P Wekesa**	**6**	**6**
(United Kingdom) **J Bates** (United Kingdom) **N Brown**	4	**6**	**6**
4	(United States) P Chamberlin (United States) T Wilkison	**6**	4	4
(Spain) F Clavet (Spain) J Sánchez	**6**	4	3
(New Zealand) **B Derlin** (New Zealand) **S Guy**	2	**6**	**6**
(United States) S DeVries (Australia) D Macpherson	3	4
2	(Spain) **S Casal** (Spain) **E Sánchez**	**6**	**6**

Quarterfinals
1	(United States) **T Pawsat** (Australia) **L Warder**	**7**	3	**6**
(United States) T Nelson (The Bahamas) R Smith	5	**6**	1
(United States) L Jensen (United States) R Reneberg	2	2
(New Zealand) **K Evernden** (Venezuela) **N Pereira**	**6**	**6**
(United States) **R Van't Hof** (Kenya) **P Wekesa**	**6**	**6**
(United Kingdom) J Bates (United Kingdom) N Brown	3	2
(New Zealand) B Derlin (New Zealand) S Guy	0	2
2	(Spain) **S Casal** (Spain) **E Sánchez**	**6**	**6**

Semifinals
1	(United States) T Pawsat (Australia) L Warder	2	**6**	3
(New Zealand) **K Evernden** (Venezuela) **N Pereira**	**6**	3	**6**
(United States) R Van't Hof (Kenya) P Wekesa	6	3
2	(Spain) **S Casal** (Spain) **E Sánchez**	**7**	**6**

Final
(New Zealand) **Kelly Evernden** (Venezuela) **Nicolás Pereira**	**6**	**7**
2	(Spain) Sergio Casal (Spain) Emilio Sánchez	4	6
