= 1989 BP National Championships – Doubles =

Doubles
- 1989 BP National Championships
- 1988 Champions: (United States) Dan Goldie (United States) Rick Leach

Final
- Champions: (Australia) Peter Doohan (Australia) Laurie Warder
- Runners-up: (United States) Rill Baxter (Canada) Glenn Michibata
- Score: 3–6, 6–2, 6–3

Details
- Draw: 16
- Seeds: 4

Events
Singles	Doubles
← 1988 ·	BP National Championships	· 1990 →

The 1989 BP National Championships was a Grand Prix tennis tournament played in Wellington in New Zealand.

Dan Goldie and Rick Leach were the defending champions but did not compete that year.

Peter Doohan and Laurie Warder won in the final 3–6, 6–2, 6–3 against Rill Baxter and Glenn Michibata.

== Seeds ==
Champion seeds are indicated in bold text while text in italics indicates the round in which those seeds were eliminated.

1. (Australia) **Peter Doohan** / (Australia) **Laurie Warder (champions)**
2. (Argentina) Horacio de la Peña / (New Zealand) Kelly Evernden (first round)
3. (Portugal) João Cunha e Silva / (Brazil) Danilo Marcelino (first round)
4. (United States) Tim Pawsat / (Sweden) Tobias Svantesson (semifinals)

== Draw ==
=== Key ===
- Q = Qualifier
- WC = Wild card
- LL = Lucky loser
- Alt = Alternate
- SE = Special exempt
- PR = Protected ranking
- ITF = ITF entry
- JE = Junior exempt
- w/o = Walkover
- r = Retired
- d = Defaulted
- SR = Special ranking

First round
1	(Australia) **P Doohan** (Australia) **L Warder**	**6**	**7**
(The Bahamas) R Smith (Kenya) P Wekesa	3	6
(United States) **J Letts** (United States) **B Man-Son-Hing**	**7**	**6**
(United States) J Canter (New Zealand) B Derlin	6	4
3	(Portugal) J Cunha e Silva (Brazil) D Marcelino	3	**6**	6
(United States) **L Jensen** (United States) **R Reneberg**	**6**	3	**8**
(West Germany) **P Baur** (New Zealand) **S Guy**	**7**	**6**
(Netherlands) M Oosting (Sweden) L-A Wahlgren	6	4
(India) R Krishnan (New Zealand) D Lewis	6	4
(Japan) **S Matsuoka** (United States) **D Wheaton**	**7**	**6**
(United States) J Barham (United States) J Klaparda	3	2
4	(United States) **T Pawsat** (Sweden) **T Svantesson**	**6**	**6**
(United States) **R Baxter** (Canada) **G Michibata**	**6**	**7**
(United States) P Chamberlin (Netherlands) M Schapers	2	6
(United States) **C Beckman** (United States) **S DeVries**	**6**	**6**
2	(Argentina) H de la Peña (New Zealand) K Evernden	4	1

Quarterfinals
1	(Australia) **P Doohan** (Australia) **L Warder**	4	**7**	**6**
(United States) J Letts (United States) B Man-Son-Hing	**6**	6	4
(United States) **L Jensen** (United States) **R Reneberg**	6	**7**	**6**
(West Germany) P Baur (New Zealand) S Guy	**7**	6	3
(Japan) S Matsuoka (United States) D Wheaton	**6**	6	6
4	(United States) **T Pawsat** (Sweden) **T Svantesson**	3	**7**	**8**
(United States) **R Baxter** (Canada) **G Michibata**	**7**	**6**
(United States) C Beckman (United States) S DeVries	5	4

Semifinals
1	(Australia) **P Doohan** (Australia) **L Warder**	**7**	**6**
(United States) L Jensen (United States) R Reneberg	6	2
4	(United States) T Pawsat (Sweden) T Svantesson	4	4
(United States) **R Baxter** (Canada) **G Michibata**	**6**	**6**

Final
1	(Australia) **Peter Doohan** (Australia) **Laurie Warder**	3	**6**	**6**
(United States) Rill Baxter (Canada) Glenn Michibata	**6**	2	3
