= 1990 BP National Championships – Singles =

Singles
- 1990 BP National Championships
- 1989 Champion: (New Zealand) Kelly Evernden

Final
- Champion: (Spain) Emilio Sánchez
- Runner-up: (United States) Richey Reneberg
- Score: 6–7^{(3–7)}, 6–4, 4–6, 6–4, 6–1

Details
- Draw: 32
- Seeds: 8

Events
Singles	Doubles
← 1989 ·	BP National Championships	· 1991 →

The 1990 BP National Championships was an ATP tennis tournament played in Wellington in New Zealand.

Kelly Evernden was the defending singles champion but lost in the first round to Lars-Anders Wahlgren.

Emilio Sánchez won in the final 6–7^{(3–7)}, 6–4, 4–6, 6–4, 6–1 against Richey Reneberg.

== Seeds ==
A champion seed is indicated in bold text while text in italics indicates the round in which that seed was eliminated.

1. (Spain) **Emilio Sánchez (champion)**
2. (Soviet Union) Andrei Chesnokov (quarterfinals)
3. (Sweden) Magnus Gustafsson (first round)
4. (New Zealand) Kelly Evernden (first round)
5. (Italy) Paolo Canè (semifinals)
6. (Spain) Javier Sánchez (first round)
7. (United States) Paul Chamberlin (second round)
8. (United States) Richey Reneberg (final)

== Draw ==
=== Key ===
- Q = Qualifier
- WC = Wild card
- LL = Lucky loser
- Alt = Alternate
- SE = Special exempt
- PR = Protected ranking
- ITF = ITF entry
- JE = Junior exempt
- w/o = Walkover
- r = Retired
- d = Defaulted
- SR = Special ranking
- NB: The Final was the best of 5 sets while all other rounds were the best of 3 sets.

=== Final ===
Final
1	(Spain) **Emilio Sánchez**	6^{3}	**6**	4	**6**	**6**
8	(United States) Richey Reneberg	**7^{7}**	4	**6**	4	1

=== Section 1 ===
First round
1	(Spain) **E Sánchez**	4	**6**	**6**
WC	(New Zealand) S Guy	**6**	4	1
WC	(New Zealand) B Steven	5	4
(Sweden) **L Jonsson**	**7**	**6**
(Australia) **R Fromberg**	**7^{7}**	**6**
(France) O Delaître	6^{5}	1
(West Germany) J Wöhrmann	3	**7^{10}**	0
7	(United States) **P Chamberlin**	**6**	6^{8}	**6**
3	(Sweden) M Gustafsson	1	5
(Israel) **G Bloom**	**6**	**7**
(West Germany) M Zoecke	3	2
(Finland) **V Paloheimo**	**6**	**6**
WC	(New Zealand) **B Derlin**	**6**	5	**6**
Q	(Finland) A Rahunen	3	**7**	3
(India) R Krishnan	4	**7**	3
6	(Italy) **P Canè**	**6**	5	**6**

Second round
1	(Spain) **E Sánchez**	4	**6**	**7**
(Sweden) L Jonsson	**6**	3	5
(Australia) **R Fromberg**	**6**	**6**
7	(United States) P Chamberlin	3	4
(Israel) **G Bloom**	**6**	4	**6**
(Finland) V Paloheimo	4	**6**	4
WC	(New Zealand) B Derlin	6^{1}	4
6	(Italy) **P Canè**	**7^{7}**	**6**

Quarterfinals
1	(Spain) **E Sánchez**	**6**	**6**
(Australia) R Fromberg	4	3
(Israel) G Bloom	6^{1}	**6**	3
6	(Italy) **P Canè**	**7^{7}**	4	**6**

Semifinals
1	(Spain) **E Sánchez**	**7**	**6**
6	(Italy) P Canè	5	2

=== Section 2 ===
First round
6	(Spain) J Sánchez	3	4
(Australia) **J Anderson**	**6**	**6**
Q	(Spain) F Clavet	2	3
(Czechoslovakia) **K Nováček**	**6**	**6**
(Canada) G Connell	5	2
(United Kingdom) **J Bates**	**7**	**6**
(Sweden) **L-A Wahlgren**	3	**7^{7}**	**7^{7}**
4	(New Zealand) K Evernden	**6**	6^{3}	6^{5}
8	(United States) **R Reneberg**	**6**	4	**7**
Q	(Spain) S Casal	3	**6**	5
(United States) D Goldie	3	2
(Sweden) **C Bergström**	**6**	**6**
(Sweden) **T Högstedt**	5	**7^{7}**	**6**
Q	(Japan) S Matsuoka	**7**	6^{4}	2
(Canada) M Wostenholme	5	**6**	1
2	(Soviet Union) **A Chesnokov**	**7**	2	**6**

Second round
(Australia) J Anderson	3	**6**	3
(Czechoslovakia) **K Nováček**	**6**	4	**6**
(United Kingdom) J Bates	4	**7^{7}**	3
(Sweden) **L-A Wahlgren**	**6**	6^{5}	**6**
8	(United States) **R Reneberg**	**6**	**6**
(Sweden) C Bergström	4	3
(Sweden) T Högstedt	6^{1}	6^{3}
2	(Soviet Union) **A Chesnokov**	**7^{7}**	**7^{7}**

Quarterfinals
(Czechoslovakia) **K Nováček**	**6**	**6**
(Sweden) L-A Wahlgren	3	1
8	(United States) **R Reneberg**	2	**6**	**6**
2	(Soviet Union) A Chesnokov	**6**	0	0

Semifinals
(Czechoslovakia) K Nováček	**7^{7}**	4	0
8	(United States) **R Reneberg**	6^{4}	**6**	**6**
