= 1986 Lipton International Players Championships – Men's doubles =

Men's doubles
- 1986 Lipton International Players Championships

Final
- Champions: (United States) Brad Gilbert (United States) Vince Van Patten
- Runners-up: (Sweden) Stefan Edberg (Sweden) Anders Järryd
- Score: Walkover

Events
Singles	men	women
Doubles	men	women
← 1985 ·	Lipton International Players Championships	· 1987 →

Paul Annacone and Christo van Rensburg were the defending champions however they lost in the first round to Brad Gilbert and Vince Van Patten.

Gilbert and Van Patten won the final on a walkover against Stefan Edberg and Anders Järryd.

== Seeds ==
1. (United States) Ken Flach / (United States) Robert Seguso (second round)
2. (Sweden) Stefan Edberg / (Sweden) Anders Järryd (final)
3. (United States) Paul Annacone / (South Africa) Christo van Rensburg (first round)
4. (Switzerland) Heinz Günthardt / (Hungary) Balázs Taróczy (second round)
5. (United States) Scott Davis / (United States) David Pate (quarterfinals)
6. (Sweden) Joakim Nyström / (Sweden) Mats Wilander (quarterfinals)
7. (Australia) John Fitzgerald / (Czechoslovakia) Tomáš Šmíd (third round)
8. (United States) Peter Fleming / (France) Guy Forget (semifinals)

== Draw ==
=== Key ===
- Q = Qualifier
- WC = Wild card
- LL = Lucky loser
- Alt = Alternate
- SE = Special exempt
- PR = Protected ranking
- ITF = ITF entry
- JE = Junior exempt
- w/o = Walkover
- r = Retired
- d = Defaulted
- SR = Special ranking

=== Finals ===
Semifinals
8	(United States) Peter Fleming (France) Guy Forget	4	4	3
(United States) Brad Gilbert (United States) Vince Van Patten	6	6	6
(West Germany) Boris Becker (Socialist Federal Republic of Yugoslavia) Slobodan Živojinović	7	4	6	3
2	(Sweden) Stefan Edberg (Sweden) Anders Järryd	6	6	7	6

Final
(United States) Brad Gilbert (United States) Vince Van Patten	w/o
2	(Sweden) Stefan Edberg (Sweden) Anders Järryd

=== Top half ===
==== Section 1 ====
First round
1	(United States) K Flach (United States) R Seguso	6	6
(Sweden) J Gunnarsson (Denmark) M Mortensen	2	2
(South Africa) E Edwards (Paraguay) F González	6	6
(United States) M Anger (United States) J Arias	2	4
(West Germany) A Maurer (New Zealand) R Simpson	7	6	7
(United Kingdom) C Dowdeswell (Italy) C Panatta	5	7	5
Q	(United States) D Saltz (United States) C Stansbury	3	2
(Switzerland) J Hlasek (Czechoslovakia) P Složil	6	6
(Spain) S Casal (Spain) E Sánchez	6	6
Q	(Austria) T Muster (Socialist Federal Republic of Yugoslavia) M Ostoja	3	1
(South Africa) D Tarr (United States) E Van't Hof	3	5
(New Zealand) K Evernden (United States) B Testerman	6	7
(United States) M Davis (United States) C Dunk	6	7
(United States) C B Cox (United States) T Moor	4	6
(United States) Tim Gullikson (United States) Tom Gullikson	6	7	2
8	(United States) P Fleming (France) G Forget	7	6	6

Second round
1	(United States) K Flach (United States) R Seguso	6	7	3
(South Africa) E Edwards (Paraguay) F González	7	5	6
(West Germany) A Maurer (New Zealand) R Simpson	6	6
(Switzerland) J Hlasek (Czechoslovakia) P Složil	7	7
(Spain) S Casal (Spain) E Sánchez	6	7
(New Zealand) K Evernden (United States) B Testerman	3	6
(United States) M Davis (United States) C Dunk	3	7	4
8	(United States) P Fleming (France) G Forget	6	5	6

Third round
(South Africa) E Edwards (Paraguay) F González	2	6
(Switzerland) J Hlasek (Czechoslovakia) P Složil	6	7
(Spain) S Casal (Spain) E Sánchez	2	6
8	(United States) P Fleming (France) G Forget	6	7

Quarterfinals
(Switzerland) J Hlasek (Czechoslovakia) P Složil	3	4
8	(United States) P Fleming (France) G Forget	6	6

==== Section 2 ====
First round
3	(United States) P Annacone (South Africa) C van Rensburg	6	1	4
(United States) B Gilbert (United States) V Van Patten	3	6	6
(Netherlands) T Nijssen (Netherlands) M Schapers	3	7	6
(West Germany) R Osterthun (Sweden) J Svensson	6	6	4
(South Africa) C Campbell (Brazil) J Góes	2	4
(United States) L Stefanki (United States) R Van't Hof	6	6
(Switzerland) C Mezzadri (Uruguay) D Pérez	6	2	5
(United States) M De Palmer (United States) G Donnelly	3	6	7
(Israel) S Glickstein (Sweden) H Simonsson	1	3
(United States) S Giammalva Jr. (United States) G Holmes	6	6
(United States) K Curren (United States) S Denton	6	6	6
(Brazil) C Kirmayr (Brazil) C Motta	4	7	3
(United Kingdom) J Bates (United States) L Shiras	6	4	7
(Socialist Federal Republic of Yugoslavia) B Orešar (Spain) J Sánchez	2	6	6
(Australia) B Dyke (Argentina) R Saad	7	5	5
6	(Sweden) J Nyström (Sweden) M Wilander	6	7	7

Second round
(United States) B Gilbert (United States) V Van Patten	6	6	6
(Netherlands) T Nijssen (Netherlands) M Schapers	7	3	3
(United States) L Stefanki (United States) R Van't Hof	6	6
(United States) M De Palmer (United States) G Donnelly	7	7
(United States) S Giammalva Jr. (United States) G Holmes	2	6
(United States) K Curren (United States) S Denton	6	7
(United Kingdom) J Bates (United States) L Shiras	4	3
6	(Sweden) J Nyström (Sweden) M Wilander	6	6

Third round
(United States) B Gilbert (United States) V Van Patten	6	6
(United States) M De Palmer (United States) G Donnelly	4	3
(United States) K Curren (United States) S Denton	4	4
6	(Sweden) J Nyström (Sweden) M Wilander	6	6

Quarterfinals
(United States) B Gilbert (United States) V Van Patten	7	6
6	(Sweden) J Nyström (Sweden) M Wilander	6	4

=== Bottom half ===
==== Section 3 ====
First round
5	(United States) S Davis (United States) D Pate	6	5	6
(Israel) A Mansdorf (Israel) S Perkiss	2	7	4
(United States) R Baxter (United States) J Gurfein	5	4
(United States) T Delatte (Australia) D Graham	7	6
(Poland) W Fibak (United States) M Mitchell	7	1	7
(Peru) P Arraya (Peru) J Yzaga	6	6	6
(India) A Amritraj (Australia) M Fancutt	3	5
(Ecuador) A Gómez (Czechoslovakia) I Lendl	6	7
(West Germany) B Becker (Socialist Federal Republic of Yugoslavia) S Živojinović	6	5	6
(Sweden) M Pernfors (United States) J Sadri	2	7	1
(United States) M Bauer (France) T Tulasne	5	4
(United States) D Cassidy (United States) M Purcell	7	6
Q	(Haiti) R Agénor (France) T Benhabiles	3	5
(United States) S Meister (United States) C Wittus	6	7
(West Germany) D Keretić (West Germany) W Popp	6	3
4	(Switzerland) H Günthardt (Hungary) B Taróczy	7	6

Second round
5	(United States) S Davis (United States) D Pate	6	6
(United States) T Delatte (Australia) D Graham	2	2
(Poland) W Fibak (United States) M Mitchell	5	6	7
(Ecuador) A Gómez (Czechoslovakia) I Lendl	7	4	6
(West Germany) B Becker (Socialist Federal Republic of Yugoslavia) S Živojinović	6	6
(United States) D Cassidy (United States) M Purcell	3	1
(United States) S Meister (United States) C Wittus	7	1	7
4	(Switzerland) H Günthardt (Hungary) B Taróczy	5	6	6

Third round
5	(United States) S Davis (United States) D Pate	6	6
(Poland) W Fibak (United States) M Mitchell	4	4
(West Germany) B Becker (Socialist Federal Republic of Yugoslavia) S Živojinović	6	6	7
(United States) S Meister (United States) C Wittus	4	7	6

Quarterfinals
5	(United States) S Davis (United States) D Pate	6	3
(West Germany) B Becker (Socialist Federal Republic of Yugoslavia) S Živojinović	7	6

==== Section 4 ====
First round
7	(Australia) J Fitzgerald (Czechoslovakia) T Šmíd	6	6
(Australia) L Warder (Australia) K Warwick	3	1
Q	(United States) M Flur (United States) J Turpin	6	7	4
(United States) G Layendecker (Canada) G Michibata	7	6	6
(United States) M Robertson (United States) T Warneke	6	6
(Sweden) S Eriksson (Sweden) P Lundgren	3	2
(United States) R Nixon (United States) J Pugh	3	4
(France) Y Noah (United States) S Stewart	6	6
(United States) J Kriek (United Kingdom) J Lloyd	6	6
(South Africa) C Steyn (South Africa) D Visser	2	4
(Chile) R Acuña (Puerto Rico) E Fernandez	6	6
(Brazil) N Aerts (Brazil) J Soares	3	3
(United States) J Arons (United States) K Richter	4	6	7
(United States) M Doyle (South Africa) C Honey	6	2	6
(United States) M Dickson (United States) T Wilkison	5	4
2	(Sweden) S Edberg (Sweden) A Järryd	7	6

Second round
7	(Australia) J Fitzgerald (Czechoslovakia) T Šmíd	6	6
(United States) G Layendecker (Canada) G Michibata	2	4
(United States) M Robertson (United States) T Warneke	7	4	6
(France) Y Noah (United States) S Stewart	5	6	7
(United States) J Kriek (United Kingdom) J Lloyd	4	7	7
(Chile) R Acuña (Puerto Rico) E Fernandez	6	6	6
(United States) J Arons (United States) K Richter	3	6	4
2	(Sweden) S Edberg (Sweden) A Järryd	6	4	6

Third round
7	(Australia) J Fitzgerald (Czechoslovakia) T Šmíd	3	2
(France) Y Noah (United States) S Stewart	6	6
(United States) J Kriek (United Kingdom) J Lloyd	2	3
2	(Sweden) S Edberg (Sweden) A Järryd	6	6

Quarterfinals
(France) Y Noah (United States) S Stewart	3	4
2	(Sweden) S Edberg (Sweden) A Järryd	6	6
