= 1989 BP National Championships – Singles =

Singles
- 1989 BP National Championships

Final
- Champion: (New Zealand) Kelly Evernden
- Runner-up: (Japan) Shuzo Matsuoka
- Score: 7–5, 6–1, 6–4

Details
- Draw: 32
- Seeds: 8

Events
Singles	Doubles
← 1988 ·	BP National Championships	· 1990 →

The 1989 BP National Championships was a Grand Prix tennis tournament played in Wellington in New Zealand.

Ramesh Krishnan was the defending champion but lost in the first round to Patrick Baur.

Kelly Evernden won in the final 7–5, 6–1, 6–4 against Shuzo Matsuoka.

== Seeds ==
A champion seed is indicated in bold text while text in italics indicates the round in which that seed was eliminated.

1. (India) Ramesh Krishnan (first round)
2. (Czechoslovakia) Milan Šrejber (quarterfinals)
3. (Netherlands) Michiel Schapers (first round)
4. (Japan) Shuzo Matsuoka (final)
5. (Sweden) Tobias Svantesson (quarterfinals)
6. (Brazil) Danilo Marcelino (first round)
7. (Canada) Glenn Michibata (semifinals)
8. (New Zealand) **Kelly Evernden (champion)**

== Draw ==
=== Key ===
- Q = Qualifier
- WC = Wild card
- LL = Lucky loser
- Alt = Alternate
- SE = Special exempt
- PR = Protected ranking
- ITF = ITF entry
- JE = Junior exempt
- w/o = Walkover
- r = Retired
- d = Defaulted
- SR = Special ranking
- NB: The Final was the best of 5 sets while all other rounds were the best of 3 sets.

=== Final ===
Final
4	(Japan) Shuzo Matsuoka	5	1	4
8	(New Zealand) **Kelly Evernden**	**7**	**6**	**6**

=== Section 1 ===
First round
1	(India) R Krishnan	4	**6**	3
(West Germany) **P Baur**	**6**	1	**6**
(Canada) C Pridham	4	5
Q	(United States) **R Weiss**	**6**	**7**
(West Germany) **H Moraing**	**7**	**6**
(Portugal) N Marques	6	3
(Sweden) L-A Wahlgren	6	**6**	3
7	(Canada) **G Michibata**	**7**	1	**6**
4	(Japan) **S Matsuoka**	**6**	**6**
(West Germany) F Dennhardt	2	1
Q	(United States) **D Wheaton**	**6**	**7**
Q	(United States) L Jensen	4	6
(New Zealand) **S Guy**	**6**	**6**
Q	(United States) M Allen	3	2
(Portugal) J Cunha e Silva	5	4
5	(Sweden) **T Svantesson**	**7**	**6**

Second round
(West Germany) **P Baur**	**6**	**6**
Q	(United States) R Weiss	4	3
(West Germany) H Moraing	2	4
7	(Canada) **G Michibata**	**6**	**6**
4	(Japan) **S Matsuoka**	**7**	**7**
Q	(United States) D Wheaton	6	6
(New Zealand) S Guy	**6**	6	5
5	(Sweden) **T Svantesson**	3	**7**	**7**

Quarterfinals
(West Germany) P Baur	6	4
7	(Canada) **G Michibata**	**7**	**6**
4	(Japan) **S Matsuoka**	**6**	**6**
5	(Sweden) T Svantesson	4	4

Semifinals
7	(Canada) G Michibata	0	3
4	(Japan) **S Matsuoka**	**6**	**6**

=== Section 2 ===
First round
6	(Brazil) D Marcelino	4	6
(The Bahamas) **R Smith**	**6**	**7**
(United States) **P Chamberlin**	**7**	**6**
(Italy) G Pozzi	6	4
(Australia) P Doohan	2	5
(Jamaica) **D Burke**	**6**	**7**
WC	(New Zealand) **D Lewis**	**6**	**6**
3	(Netherlands) M Schapers	3	4
8	(New Zealand) **K Evernden**	**6**	2	**6**
(Kenya) P Wekesa	1	**6**	1
(United States) M Kures	3	3
(Netherlands) **M Oosting**	**6**	**6**
WC	(New Zealand) **B Steven**	**7**	**6**
WC	(New Zealand) B Derlin	6	2
LL	(United Kingdom) C Bailey	4	2
2	(Czechoslovakia) **M Šrejber**	**6**	**6**

Second round
(The Bahamas) R Smith	**6**	6	1
(United States) **P Chamberlin**	3	**7**	**6**
(Jamaica) **D Burke**	**6**	3	**6**
WC	(New Zealand) D Lewis	3	**6**	1
8	(New Zealand) **K Evernden**	3	**6**	**6**
(Netherlands) M Oosting	**6**	3	4
WC	(New Zealand) B Steven	3	3
2	(Czechoslovakia) **M Šrejber**	**6**	**6**

Quarterfinals
(United States) **P Chamberlin**	**7**	**7**
(Jamaica) D Burke	6	5
8	(New Zealand) **K Evernden**	**6**	**6**
2	(Czechoslovakia) M Šrejber	3	2

Semifinals
(United States) P Chamberlin	2	4
8	(New Zealand) **K Evernden**	**6**	**6**
