= 1991 Fernleaf Butter Classic – Doubles =

Doubles
- 1991 Fernleaf Butter Classic

Final
- Champions: (Australia) Jo-Anne Faull (New Zealand) Julie Richardson
- Runners-up: (United Kingdom) Belinda Borneo (United Kingdom) Clare Wood
- Score: 2–6, 7–5, 7–6^{(7–4)}

Details
- Draw: 16 (1WC/1Q/1LL)
- Seeds: 4

Events
| Singles | Doubles |
| ← 1990 · | Wellington Classic | · 1992 → |

Natalia Medvedeva and Leila Meskhi were the defending champions, but Medvedeva did not compete this year. Meskhi teamed up with Anne Minter and lost in the first round to Donna Faber and Ginger Helgeson.

Jo-Anne Faull and Julie Richardson won the title by defeating Belinda Borneo and Clare Wood 2–6, 7–5, 7–6^{(7–4)} in the final.

== Seeds ==
1. (Australia) Jo-Anne Faull / (New Zealand) Julie Richardson (champions)
2. (New Zealand) ~~Belinda Cordwell~~ / (Sweden) ~~Maria Strandlund~~ (withdrew)
3. (United States) Cammy MacGregor / (United States) Shaun Stafford (first round)
4. (Germany) Claudia Porwik / (Germany) Wiltrud Probst (semifinals)

== Draw ==
=== Key ===
- Q = Qualifier
- WC = Wild card
- LL = Lucky loser
- Alt = Alternate
- SE = Special exempt
- PR = Protected ranking
- ITF = ITF entry
- JE = Junior exempt
- w/o = Walkover
- r = Retired
- d = Defaulted
- SR = Special ranking

=== Draw ===
First round
1 | (Australia) JA Faull (New Zealand) J Richardson | 6 | 6
(Netherlands) M Oremans (Netherlands) Helen van den Berg | 4 | 1
(United States) D Faber (United States) G Helgeson | 6 | 4 | 6
(Soviet Union) L Meskhi (Australia) A Minter | 4 | 6 | 2
3 | (United States) Ca MacGregor (United States) S Stafford | 4 | 6 | 6^{5}
(Poland) R Basanski (Australia) T Morton | 6 | 2 | 7^{7}
(Australia) K Godridge (Australia) N Pratt | 3 | 6 | 5
(Czechoslovakia) J Pospíšilová (Czechoslovakia) D Szabová | 6 | 4 | 7
(Czechoslovakia) A Strnadová (Czechoslovakia) E Švíglerová | 7 | 7
WC | (New Zealand) C Toleafoa (Switzerland) E Zardo | 5 | 5
(Finland) N Dahlman (Mexico) L Novelo | 1 | 6 | 3
4 | (Germany) C Porwik (Germany) W Probst | 6 | 4 | 6
(Belgium) A Devries (Belgium) S Wasserman | 2 | 2
(United Kingdom) B Borneo (United Kingdom) C Wood | 6 | 6
Q | (Czechoslovakia) K Habšudová (Germany) B Rittner | 4 | 7 | 4
LL | (France) N Guerrée (Netherlands) S Rottier | 6 | 5 | 6

Quarterfinals
1 | (Australia) JA Faull (New Zealand) J Richardson | 6 | 6
(United States) D Faber (United States) G Helgeson | 3 | 3
(Poland) R Basanski (Australia) T Morton | 6^{2} | 7^{7} | 3
(Czechoslovakia) J Pospíšilová (Czechoslovakia) D Szabová | 7^{7} | 6^{5} | 6
(Czechoslovakia) A Strnadová (Czechoslovakia) E Švíglerová | 1 | 3
4 | (Germany) C Porwik (Germany) W Probst | 6 | 6
(United Kingdom) B Borneo (United Kingdom) C Wood | 7 | 6
LL | (France) N Guerrée (Netherlands) S Rottier | 5 | 2

Semifinals
1 | (Australia) JA Faull (New Zealand) J Richardson | 6 | 7^{7}
(Czechoslovakia) J Pospíšilová (Czechoslovakia) D Szabová | 3 | 6^{2}
4 | (Germany) C Porwik (Germany) W Probst | 6^{4} | 2
(United Kingdom) B Borneo (United Kingdom) C Wood | 7^{7} | 6

Final
1 | (Australia) JA Faull (New Zealand) J Richardson | 2 | 7 | 7^{7}
(United Kingdom) B Borneo (United Kingdom) C Wood | 6 | 5 | 6^{4}
