= 1986 Lipton International Players Championships =

- Date: February 10–24
- Edition: 2nd
- Surface: Hard / outdoor
- Location: Boca West, Florida, U.S.

Champions

Men's singles
- (Czechoslovakia) Ivan Lendl

Women's singles
- (United States) Chris Evert-Lloyd

Men's doubles
- (United States) Brad Gilbert / (United States) Vince Van Patten

Women's doubles
- (United States) Pam Shriver / (Czechoslovakia) Helena Suková
← 1985 ·	Miami Open	· 1987 →

The 1986 Lipton International Players Championships was a tennis tournament played on outdoor hard courts. It was the 2nd edition of the Miami Masters and was part of the 1986 Nabisco Grand Prix and the 1985 Virginia Slims World Championship Series. Both the men's and the women's events took place in Boca West, Florida from February 10 through February 24, 1986.

== Finals ==
=== Men's singles ===
(Czechoslovakia) Ivan Lendl defeated (Sweden) Mats Wilander 3–6, 6–1, 7–6, 6–4

- It was Lendl's 2nd title of the year and the 59th of his career.

=== Women's singles ===
(United States) Chris Evert Lloyd defeated (West Germany) Steffi Graf 6–4, 6–2

- It was Evert Lloyd's 1st title of the year and the 146th of her career.

=== Men's doubles ===
(United States) Brad Gilbert / (United States) Vince Van Patten defeated (Sweden) Stefan Edberg / (Sweden) Anders Järryd by walkover

- It was Gilbert's 1st title of the year and the 8th of his career. It was Van Patten's only title of the year and the 2nd of his career.

=== Women's doubles ===
(United States) Pam Shriver / (Czechoslovakia) Helena Suková defeated (United States) Chris Evert Lloyd / (Australia) Wendy Turnbull 6–2, 6–3

- It was Shriver's 1st title of the year and the 79th of her career. It was Suková's 1st title of the year and the 13th of her career.
