= 1986 Lipton International Players Championships – Women's singles =

Women's singles
- 1986 Lipton International Players Championships

Final
- Champion: (United States) Chris Evert Lloyd
- Runner-up: (West Germany) Steffi Graf
- Score: 6–4, 6–2

Details
- Draw: 128
- Seeds: 16

Events
Singles	men	women
Doubles	men	women
- Miami Open

Martina Navratilova was the defending champion, but could not compete this year due to a flu.

Chris Evert Lloyd won the title by defeating Steffi Graf 6–4, 6–2 in the final.

== Seeds ==
1. (United States) Chris Evert (champion)
2. (West Germany) Steffi Graf (final)
3. (United States) Pam Shriver (first round)
4. (Bulgaria) Manuela Maleeva (fourth round)
5. (United States) Bonnie Gadusek (third round)
6. (United States) Zina Garrison (quarterfinals)
7. (Czechoslovakia) Helena Suková (semifinals)
8. (Argentina) Gabriela Sabatini (third round)
9. (United States) Kathy Rinaldi (semifinals)
10. (Sweden) Catarina Lindqvist (fourth round)
11. (Australia) Wendy Turnbull (first round)
12. (Canada) Carling Bassett-Seguso (quarterfinals)
13. (United States) Stephanie Rehe (second round)
14. (United States) Barbara Potter (quarterfinals)
15. (Hungary) Andrea Temesvári (first round)
16. (United States) Kathy Jordan (fourth round)

Click on the seed number of a player to go to their draw section.

== Draw ==
Key

- Q = Qualifier
- WC = Wild card
- LL = Lucky loser
- Alt = Alternate
- ITF = ITF entry
- PR = Protected ranking
- SR = Special ranking
- SE = Special exempt
- JE = Junior exempt
- JR = Junior Accelerator Programme entrant
- CO = College Accelerator Programme entrant
- NG = Next Gen Accelerator Program entrant
- w/o = Walkover
- r = Retired
- d = Defaulted

=== Finals ===
Quarterfinals
1	(United States) Chris Evert	6	6
(United States) Terry Phelps	2	0
12	(Canada) Carling Bassett-Seguso	6	2
9	(United States) Kathy Rinaldi	7	6
7	(Czechoslovakia) Helena Suková	6	6
14	(United States) Barbara Potter	1	2
6	(United States) Zina Garrison	2	7	3
2	(West Germany) Steffi Graf	6	6	6

Semifinals
1	(United States) Chris Evert	7	6
9	(United States) Kathy Rinaldi	6	1
7	(Czechoslovakia) Helena Suková	2	1
2	(West Germany) Steffi Graf	6	6

Final
1	(United States) Chris Evert	6	6
2	(West Germany) Steffi Graf	4	2

=== Top half ===
==== Section 1 ====
First round
1	(United States) C Evert	6	6
(United States) S Sloane	4	4
(United States) J Klitch	6	2
(France) M-C Calleja	7	6
(United States) B Norton	1	7	5
(Australia) A Tobin	6	5	7
(France) C Suire	6	7
(Italy) S Cecchini	4	5
(France) N Herreman	3	3
(United States) C Reynolds	6	6
(Australia) L Field	3	2
(United States) G Kim	6	6
(Australia) E Minter	6	2	7
(United States) P Louie Harper	2	6	5
(United States) R White	3	0
16	(United States) K Jordan	6	6

Second round
1	(United States) C Evert	6	6
(France) M-C Calleja	4	0
(Australia) A Tobin	6	6
(France) C Suire	2	2
(United States) C Reynolds	6	3	4
(United States) G Kim	4	6	6
(Australia) E Minter	1	5
16	(United States) K Jordan	6	7

Third round
1	(United States) C Evert	7	6
(Australia) A Tobin	5	2
(United States) G Kim	2	0
16	(United States) K Jordan	6	6

Fourth round
1	(United States) C Evert	7	6
16	(United States) K Jordan	5	2

==== Section 2 ====
First round
13	(United States) S Rehe	6	6
(Sweden) C Karlsson	3	3
(United States) T Phelps	6	1	6
(Australia) E Smylie	3	6	4
(United States) A Holton	2	1
(United Kingdom) J Durie	6	6
(United States) C Fernandez-Parker	4	2
(United States) P Casale	6	6
(United Kingdom) A Croft	6	2	6
(France) N Tauziat	4	6	4
(Australia) D Fromholtz	7	6
(Argentina) A Villagrán	5	3
(Argentina) M Paz	4	4
(New Zealand) B Cordwell	6	6
(United States) B Nagelsen	4	2
8	(Argentina) G Sabatini	6	6

Second round
13	(United States) S Rehe	3	2
(United States) T Phelps	6	6
(United Kingdom) J Durie	6	7
(United States) P Casale	4	6
(United Kingdom) A Croft	3	4
(Australia) D Fromholtz	6	6
(New Zealand) B Cordwell	3	6
8	(Argentina) G Sabatini	6	7

Third round
(United States) T Phelps	6	6
(United Kingdom) J Durie	4	2
(Australia) D Fromholtz	7	6
8	(Argentina) G Sabatini	5	4

Fourth round
(United States) T Phelps	7	6
(Australia) D Fromholtz	6	2

==== Section 3 ====
First round
3	(United States) P Shriver	3	6	4
(United States) K Gompert	6	3	6
(United States) T Mochizuki	2	3
(Switzerland) C Jolissaint	6	6
(South Africa) D Van Rensburg	1	7	6
(United States) M Lou Piatek-Daniels	6	6	1
(United States) S Mascarin	6	3	1
(United States) E Burgin	2	6	6
(Sweden) M Lindström	6	1
(Austria) P Huber	7	6
(United States) C Benjamin	6	6	6
(United States) H Na	7	3	4
(United States) K McDonald	0	3
(Sweden) M Lundqvist	6	6
(Japan) A Kijimuta	5	3
12	(Canada) C Bassett-Seguso	7	6

Second round
(United States) K Gompert	6	6
(Switzerland) C Jolissaint	2	2
(South Africa) D Van Rensburg	4	4
(United States) E Burgin	6	6
(Austria) P Huber	3	4
(United States) C Benjamin	6	6
(Sweden) M Lundqvist	7	1	1
12	(Canada) C Bassett-Seguso	5	6	6

Third round
(United States) K Gompert	2	7	6
(United States) E Burgin	6	6	3
(United States) C Benjamin	2	4
12	(Canada) C Bassett-Seguso	6	6

Fourth round
(United States) K Gompert	3	1
12	(Canada) C Bassett-Seguso	6	6

==== Section 4 ====
First round
9	(United States) K Rinaldi	6	6
(Switzerland) L Drescher	1	0
(United States) L Spain Short	3	6	1
(France) C Tanvier	6	4	6
(Czechoslovakia) R Maršíková	6	6
(United States) S Walsh	1	0
(West Germany) B Bunge	6	6
(United States) E Longo	0	1
(Brazil) N Dias	1	2
(Czechoslovakia) I Budařová	6	6
(United States) A Ivan	6	2	6
(United States) J Russell	1	6	4
(Czechoslovakia) A Holíková	4	6	1
(United States) M Joe Fernández	6	3	6
(Socialist Federal Republic of Yugoslavia) M Jaušovec	1	0
5	(United States) B Gadusek	6	6

Second round
9	(United States) K Rinaldi	6	6
(France) C Tanvier	3	3
(Czechoslovakia) R Maršíková	3	0
(West Germany) B Bunge	6	6
(Czechoslovakia) I Budařová	6	1
(United States) A Ivan	7	6
(United States) M Joe Fernández	1	2
5	(United States) B Gadusek	6	6

Third round
9	(United States) K Rinaldi	6	6
(West Germany) B Bunge	4	4
(United States) A Ivan	4	6	7
5	(United States) B Gadusek	6	4	6

Fourth round
9	(United States) K Rinaldi	6	6
(United States) A Ivan	3	4

=== Bottom half ===
==== Section 5 ====
First round
7	(Czechoslovakia) H Suková	6	7
(United States) M Werdel	1	5
(France) S Amiach	7	7
(United States) L Antonoplis	5	6
(United States) M Van Nostrand	0	3
(Bulgaria) K Maleeva	6	6
(Greece) A Kanellopoulou	5	3
(Netherlands) M Mesker	7	6
(South Africa) Y Vermaak	6	6
(Japan) M Yanagi	3	3
(United States) L-A Thompson	3	6	1
(Brazil) P Medrado	6	2	6
(United States) K Sands	5	6
(West Germany) M Schropp	7	7
(West Germany) E Pfaff	1	2
10	(Sweden) C Lindqvist	6	6

Second round
7	(Czechoslovakia) H Suková	6	6
(France) S Amiach	2	3
(Bulgaria) K Maleeva	6	6	6
(Netherlands) M Mesker	7	1	2
(South Africa) Y Vermaak	3	6	3
(Brazil) P Medrado	6	3	6
(West Germany) M Schropp	4	3
10	(Sweden) C Lindqvist	6	6

Third round
7	(Czechoslovakia) H Suková	6	7
(Bulgaria) K Maleeva	4	5
(Brazil) P Medrado	4	0
10	(Sweden) C Lindqvist	6	6

Fourth round
7	(Czechoslovakia) H Suková	6	6
10	(Sweden) C Lindqvist	1	3

==== Section 6 ====
First round
14	(United States) B Potter	6	6
(United States) V Nelson-Dunbar	3	4
(United States) L McNeil	3	6	6
(Denmark) T Scheuer-Larsen	6	1	2
(Australia) J Thompson	6	6
(Peru) P Vásquez	1	2
(Australia) A Minter	7	2	4
(United States) K Horvath	6	6	6
(Italy) R Reggi	6	4	6
(France) P Paradis	4	6	4
(Brazil) C Monteiro	1	6	2
(United States) L Bonder	6	4	0^{r}
(United States) A Jaeger	7	2	2
(United States) A Henricksson	6	6	6
(Peru) L Arraya	6	1	1
4	(Bulgaria) M Maleeva	4	6	6

Second round
14	(United States) B Potter	7	6
(United States) L McNeil	6	2
(Australia) J Thompson	5	5
(United States) K Horvath	7	7
(Italy) R Reggi	7	6
(Brazil) C Monteiro	6	0
(United States) A Henricksson	2	2
4	(Bulgaria) M Maleeva	6	6

Third round
14	(United States) B Potter	6	4	6
(United States) K Horvath	2	6	4
(Italy) R Reggi	5	1
4	(Bulgaria) M Maleeva	7	6

Fourth round
14	(United States) B Potter	6	2	7
4	(Bulgaria) M Maleeva	3	6	5

==== Section 7 ====
First round
6	(United States) Z Garrison	6	6
(West Germany) I Cueto	2	2
(United States) B Herr	6	6
(West Germany) A Betzner	4	2
(Sweden) K Karlsson	6	5	7
(United States) T Holladay	3	7	6
(South Africa) J Mundel	6	6
(United States) M Schillig	4	3
(Canada) H Kelesi	5	1
(Socialist Federal Republic of Yugoslavia) S Goleš	7	6
(United States) M Torres	6	6
(United States) D Spence	1	4
(New Zealand) J Richardson	6	4	6
(Romania) V Ruzici	4	6	2
(South Africa) R Fairbank	6	6
11	(Australia) W Turnbull	3	4

Second round
6	(United States) Z Garrison	7	6
(United States) B Herr	5	3
(Sweden) K Karlsson	2	3
(South Africa) J Mundel	6	6
(Socialist Federal Republic of Yugoslavia) S Goleš	3	6	7
(United States) M Torres	6	4	6
(New Zealand) J Richardson	2	5
(South Africa) R Fairbank	6	7

Third round
6	(United States) Z Garrison	6	6
(South Africa) J Mundel	4	3
(Socialist Federal Republic of Yugoslavia) S Goleš	6	6
(South Africa) R Fairbank	2	2

Fourth round
6	(United States) Z Garrison	6	7
(Socialist Federal Republic of Yugoslavia) S Goleš	1	6

==== Section 8 ====
First round
15	(Hungary) A Temesvári	6	7	1
(United States) A Moulton	7	6	6
(France) I Demongeot	7	1	2
(United States) W White	5	6	6
(United States) K Jones	6	5	4
(Czechoslovakia) K Skronská	4	7	6
(United States) B Gerken	3	6	4
(United States) P Barg	6	2	6
(United Kingdom) S Gomer	6	6	6
(West Germany) C Porwik	7	3	4
(United States) A Smith	5	5
(United States) P Fendick	7	7
(United States) S Foltz	4	6	6
(West Germany) P Keppeler	6	2	2
(United States) M Gurney	6	5	1
2	(West Germany) S Graf	1	7	6

Second round
(United States) A Moulton	7	6
(United States) W White	6	3
(Czechoslovakia) K Skronská	5	6	5
(United States) P Barg	7	4	7
(United Kingdom) S Gomer	7	7
(United States) P Fendick	5	6
(United States) S Foltz	2	4
2	(West Germany) S Graf	6	6

Third round
(United States) A Moulton	6	6
(United States) P Barg	1	1
(United Kingdom) S Gomer	0	6	4
2	(West Germany) S Graf	6	4	6

Fourth round
(United States) A Moulton	1	4
2	(West Germany) S Graf	6	6
