= 1992 Fernleaf Butter Classic =

- Date: 3–9 February
- Edition: 5th
- Category: Tier V
- Draw: 32S / 16D
- Prize money: $100,000
- Surface: Hard / outdoor
- Location: Wellington, New Zealand
- Venue: Wellington Renouf Tennis Centre

Champions

Singles
- (France) Noëlle van Lottum

Doubles
- (United Kingdom) Belinda Borneo / (United Kingdom) Clare Wood
← 1991 ·	Wellington Classic

The 1992 Fernleaf Butter Classic was a women's tennis tournament played on outdoor hard courts at the Wellington Renouf Tennis Centre in Wellington, New Zealand, and was part of the Tier V category of the 1992 WTA Tour. It was the fifth and last edition of the tournament and was held from 3 February until 9 February 1992. Unseeded Noëlle van Lottum won the singles title and earned $18,000 first-prize money.

== Finals ==
=== Singles ===
(France) Noëlle van Lottum defeated (United States) Donna Faber 6–4, 6–0

- It was Van Lottum's only singles title of her career.

=== Doubles ===
(United Kingdom) Belinda Borneo / (United Kingdom) Clare Wood defeated (Australia) Jo-Anne Faull / (New Zealand) Julie Richardson 6–0, 7–6^{(7–5)}
