= 1986 Lipton International Players Championships – Men's singles =

Men's singles
- 1986 Lipton International Players Championships

Final
- Champion: (Czechoslovakia) Ivan Lendl
- Runner-up: (Sweden) Mats Wilander
- Score: 3–6, 6–1, 7–6, 6–4

Events
| Singles | men | women |
| Doubles | men | women |
| ← 1985 · | Lipton International Players Championships | · 1987 → |

Tim Mayotte was the defending champion but did not compete that year.

Ivan Lendl won in the final 3–6, 6–1, 7–6, 6–4 against Mats Wilander.

== Seeds ==
1. (Czechoslovakia) Ivan Lendl (champion)
2. (Sweden) Mats Wilander (final)
3. (United States) Jimmy Connors (semifinals, defaulted)
4. (West Germany) Boris Becker (third round)
5. (Sweden) Stefan Edberg (semifinals, retired)
6. (France) Yannick Noah (quarterfinals)
7. (Sweden) Anders Järryd (first round)
8. (United States) ~~Tim Mayotte~~ (withdrew)
9. (United States) Kevin Curren (second round)
10. (Sweden) Joakim Nyström (quarterfinals)
11. (United States) Johan Kriek (first round)
12. (United States) Paul Annacone (first round)
13. (United States) Brad Gilbert (third round)
14. (Czechoslovakia) Tomáš Šmíd (third round)
15. (Ecuador) Andrés Gómez (fourth round)
16. (United States) Scott Davis (first round)
17. (United States) Jimmy Arias (fourth round)
18. n/a
19. (France) Thierry Tulasne (fourth round)
20. (United States) David Pate (fourth round)
21. (Sweden) Jan Gunnarsson (fourth round)
22. (United States) Matt Anger (third round)
23. (Switzerland) Jakob Hlasek (first round)
24. (United States) Aaron Krickstein (third round)
25. (Sweden) Peter Lundgren (third round)
26. (West Germany) Andreas Maurer (first round)
27. (Switzerland) Heinz Günthardt (first round)
28. (Socialist Federal Republic of Yugoslavia) Slobodan Živojinović (first round)
29. (Belgium) Libor Pimek (second round)
30. (Spain) Sergio Casal (second round)
31. (United States) Mike Leach (third round)
32. (United States) Greg Holmes (third round)

== Main draw ==
=== Key ===
- Q = Qualifier
- WC = Wild card
- LL = Lucky loser
- Alt = Alternate
- SE = Special exempt
- PR = Protected ranking
- ITF = ITF entry
- JE = Junior exempt
- w/o = Walkover
- r = Retired
- d = Defaulted
- SR = Special ranking

=== Finals ===
Quarterfinals
1 | (Czechoslovakia) Ivan Lendl | 6 | 6 | 6
10 | (Sweden) Joakim Nyström | 1 | 1 | 4
WC/3 | (United States) Jimmy Connors | 5 | 6 | 7 | 6
6 | (France) Yannick Noah | 7 | 4 | 6 | 4
5 | (Sweden) Stefan Edberg | 6 | 6 | 6
(Czechoslovakia) Milan Šrejber | 1 | 0 | 2
(France) Guy Forget | 7 | 4 | 4 | 3
2 | (Sweden) Mats Wilander | 5 | 6 | 6 | 6

Semifinals
1 | (Czechoslovakia) Ivan Lendl | 1 | 6 | 6 | 2 | 5
WC/3 | (United States) Jimmy Connors | 6 | 1 | 2 | 6 | 2^{d}
5 | (Sweden) Stefan Edberg | 4 | 0^{r}
2 | (Sweden) Mats Wilander | 6 | 1

Final
1 | (Czechoslovakia) Ivan Lendl | 3 | 6 | 7 | 6
2 | (Sweden) Mats Wilander | 6 | 1 | 6 | 4

=== Top half ===
==== Section 1 ====
First round
1 | (Czechoslovakia) I Lendl | 6 | 3 | 7
(United States) J Sadri | 2 | 6 | 6
Q | (United States) D Cassidy | 3 | 1
Q | (South Africa) C van Rensburg | 6 | 6
Q | (South Africa) C Campbell | 4 | 2
(United States) B Green | 6 | 6
(Argentina) H de la Peña | 6 | 4
32 | (United States) G Holmes | 7 | 6
17 | (United States) J Arias | 6 | 6
(Brazil) C Kirmayr | 2 | 2
(United States) J Brown | 6 | 6
(West Germany) H Schwaier | 4 | 4
LL | (Canada) S Bonneau | 7 | 4 | 2
(United States) G Layendecker | 5 | 6 | 6
(West Germany) W Popp | 6 | 3 | 7
16 | (United States) S Davis | 3 | 6 | 5

Second round
1 | (Czechoslovakia) I Lendl | 6 | 6
Q | (South Africa) C van Rensburg | 4 | 1
(United States) B Green | 3 | 4
32 | (United States) G Holmes | 6 | 6
17 | (United States) J Arias | 6 | 6
(United States) J Brown | 0 | 2
(United States) G Layendecker | 7 | 1 | 6
(West Germany) W Popp | 5 | 6 | 3

Third round
1 | (Czechoslovakia) I Lendl | 6 | 7
32 | (United States) G Holmes | 4 | 6
17 | (United States) J Arias | 6 | 6
(United States) G Layendecker | 3 | 4

Fourth round
1 | (Czechoslovakia) I Lendl | 6 | 7
17 | (United States) J Arias | 1 | 5

==== Section 2 ====
First round
10 | (Sweden) J Nyström | 6 | 6
(United States) Tom Gullikson | 3 | 1
(Mexico) L Lavalle | 6 | 3
(United States) V Van Patten | 7 | 6
(United States) J Canter | 4 | 6 | 7
(Israel) A Mansdorf | 6 | 3 | 5
(Socialist Federal Republic of Yugoslavia) G Prpić | 0^{r}
24 | (United States) A Krickstein | 4
25 | (Sweden) P Lundgren | 6 | 6
(United Kingdom) J Bates | 3 | 0
(Brazil) C Motta | 6 | 6
(Switzerland) C Mezzadri | 3 | 4
(Peru) P Arraya | 6 | 6
(United States) M Flur | 3 | 2
(United States) L Shiras | 7 | 2 | 4
LL | (United States) C B Cox | 6 | 6 | 6

Second round
10 | (Sweden) J Nyström | 6 | 6
(United States) V Van Patten | 2 | 0
(United States) J Canter | 1 | 0
24 | (United States) A Krickstein | 6 | 6
25 | (Sweden) P Lundgren | 6 | 6
(Brazil) C Motta | 2 | 2
(Peru) P Arraya | 6 | 6 | 6
LL | (United States) C B Cox | 4 | 7 | 4

Third round
10 | (Sweden) J Nyström | 6 | 6
24 | (United States) A Krickstein | 2 | 1
25 | (Sweden) P Lundgren | 3 | 6
(Peru) P Arraya | 6 | 7

Fourth round
10 | (Sweden) J Nyström | 6 | 6
(Peru) P Arraya | 2 | 4

==== Section 3 ====
First round
WC/3 | (United States) J Connors | 6 | 6
Q | (United States) S Denton | 2 | 4
(Czechoslovakia) M Vajda | 6 | 1
(Italy) C Panatta | 7 | 6
(United States) M Dickson | 6 | 6
Q | (United States) J Sorbo | 2 | 3
(United States) K Flach | 4 | 4
30 | (Spain) S Casal | 6 | 6
19 | (France) T Tulasne | 7 | 4 | 6
(United States) S Giammalva, Jr. | 5 | 6 | 3
Q | (United States) J Lapidus | 3 | 4
(United Kingdom) J Lloyd | 6 | 6
(Israel) S Perkiss | 6 | 4 | 6
(Haiti) R Agénor | 3 | 6 | 7
(Uruguay) D Pérez | 3 | 3
13 | (United States) B Gilbert | 6 | 6

Second round
WC/3 | (United States) J Connors | 6 | 6 | 7
(Italy) C Panatta | 7 | 3 | 6
(United States) M Dickson | 6 | 6
30 | (Spain) S Casal | 2 | 1
19 | (France) T Tulasne | 7 | 6
(United Kingdom) J Lloyd | 5 | 3
(Haiti) R Agénor | 2 | 5
13 | (United States) B Gilbert | 6 | 7

Third round
WC/3 | (United States) J Connors | 4 | 6 | 6
(United States) M Dickson | 6 | 3 | 2
19 | (France) T Tulasne | 7 | 6
13 | (United States) B Gilbert | 5 | 2

Fourth round
WC/3 | (United States) J Connors | 6 | 5 | 7
19 | (France) T Tulasne | 1 | 7 | 6

==== Section 4 ====
First round
11 | (United States) J Kriek | 6 | 6 | 5
(Netherlands) M Schapers | 7 | 4 | 7
Q | (United States) B Scanlon | 6 | 6
(Socialist Federal Republic of Yugoslavia) B Orešar | 4 | 3
(United States) M De Palmer | 4 | 4
Q | (United States) J Gurfein | 6 | 6
(Argentina) R Saad | 5 | 3
21 | (Sweden) J Gunnarsson | 7 | 6
28 | (Socialist Federal Republic of Yugoslavia) S Živojinović | 2 | 4
(United States) M Purcell | 6 | 6
(United States) T Wilkison | 6 | 6
(South Africa) B Moir | 3 | 3
(United States) H Solomon | 6 | 6
(New Zealand) R Simpson | 4 | 4
WC | (United States) J Berger | 6 | 1 | 3
6 | (France) Y Noah | 4 | 6 | 6

Second round
(Netherlands) M Schapers | 6 | 7
Q | (United States) B Scanlon | 4 | 5
Q | (United States) J Gurfein | 1 | 4
21 | (Sweden) J Gunnarsson | 6 | 6
(United States) M Purcell | 4 | 3
(United States) T Wilkison | 6 | 6
(United States) H Solomon | 6 | 0 | 1
6 | (France) Y Noah | 4 | 6 | 6

Third round
(Netherlands) M Schapers | 2 | 3
21 | (Sweden) J Gunnarsson | 6 | 6
(United States) T Wilkison | 4 | 6 | 3
6 | (France) Y Noah | 6 | 1 | 6

Fourth round
21 | (Sweden) J Gunnarsson | 1 | 6
6 | (France) Y Noah | 6 | 7

=== Bottom half ===
==== Section 5 ====
First round
5 | (Sweden) S Edberg | 7 | 6
(Sweden) S Eriksson | 6 | 4
(New Zealand) K Evernden | 3 | 6 | 6
LL | (United States) M Doyle | 6 | 3 | 7
Q | (Socialist Federal Republic of Yugoslavia) M Ostoja | 6 | 4
(West Germany) D Keretić | 7 | 6
WC | (United States) Tim Gullikson | 7 | 7
27 | (Switzerland) H Günthardt | 6 | 6
21 | (United States) M Anger | 7 | 6
(Mexico) F Maciel | 6 | 1
(United States) L Stefanki | 2 | 1
(Australia) J Fitzgerald | 6 | 6
(Austria) T Muster | 6 | 3 | 6
(United States) M Davis | 2 | 6 | 7
(Chile) R Acuña | 6 | 4 | 7
12 | (United States) P Annacone | 3 | 6 | 6

Second round
5 | (Sweden) S Edberg | 6 | 6
LL | (United States) M Doyle | 3 | 4
(West Germany) D Keretić | 6 | 6
WC | (United States) Tim Gullikson | 1 | 2
21 | (United States) M Anger | 6 | 6
(Australia) J Fitzgerald | 2 | 4
(United States) M Davis | 6 | 5 | 6
(Chile) R Acuña | 3 | 7 | 2

Third round
5 | (Sweden) S Edberg | 6 | 6
(West Germany) D Keretić | 1 | 1
21 | (United States) M Anger | 2 | 4
(United States) M Davis | 6 | 6

Fourth round
5 | (Sweden) S Edberg | 6 | 6
(United States) M Davis | 2 | 3

==== Section 6 ====
First round
14 | (Czechoslovakia) T Šmíd | 6 | 6
(Spain) J López-Maeso | 1 | 4
WC | (Italy) F Cancellotti | 6 | 6 | 6
Q | (South Africa) K Moir | 7 | 4 | 4
Q | (United States) T Warneke | 7 | 6
(Paraguay) F González | 6 | 3
(United States) T Moor | 1 | 3
20 | (United States) D Pate | 6 | 6
29 | (Belgium) L Pimek | 4 | 7 | 6
(United States) P Fleming | 6 | 5 | 3
(Czechoslovakia) M Šrejber | 6 | 6
(West Germany) M Westphal | 4 | 4
(Czechoslovakia) P Složil | 6 | 6
(France) T Benhabiles | 3 | 3
Q | (Netherlands) T Nijssen | 3 | 5
4 | (West Germany) B Becker | 6 | 7

Second round
14 | (Czechoslovakia) T Šmíd | 6 | 6 | 6
WC | (Italy) F Cancellotti | 2 | 7 | 3
Q | (United States) T Warneke | 3 | 5
20 | (United States) D Pate | 6 | 7
29 | (Belgium) L Pimek | 4 | 4
(Czechoslovakia) M Šrejber | 6 | 6
(Czechoslovakia) P Složil | 4 | 4
4 | (West Germany) B Becker | 6 | 6

Third round
14 | (Czechoslovakia) T Šmíd | 1 | 1
20 | (United States) D Pate | 6 | 6
(Czechoslovakia) M Šrejber | 7 | 6
4 | (West Germany) B Becker | 6 | 3

Fourth round
20 | (United States) D Pate | 6 | 6 | 4
(Czechoslovakia) M Šrejber | 3 | 7 | 6

==== Section 7 ====
First round
7 | (Sweden) A Järryd | 4 | 6
(Sweden) J Svensson | 6 | 7
(United States) B Testerman | 6 | 3
Q | (South Africa) M Robertson | 7 | 6
(Brazil) J Soares | 6 | 6
Q | (Israel) S Glickstein | 1 | 4
(South Africa) C Steyn | 7 | 6
26 | (West Germany) A Maurer | 6 | 4
23 | (Switzerland) J Hlasek | 6 | 6 | 3
(Peru) J Yzaga | 7 | 2 | 6
(France) G Forget | 6 | 6
Q | (United States) D Wheaton | 3 | 4
(Romania) F Segărceanu | 6 | 4 | 2
(South Africa) E Edwards | 1 | 6 | 6
(Canada) M Wostenholme | 4 | 2
9 | (United States) K Curren | 6 | 6

Second round
(Sweden) J Svensson | 6 | 6
Q | (South Africa) M Robertson | 7 | 7
(Brazil) J Soares | 4 | 4
(South Africa) C Steyn | 6 | 6
(Peru) J Yzaga | 2 | 6
(France) G Forget | 6 | 7
(South Africa) E Edwards | 6 | 6
9 | (United States) K Curren | 4 | 2

Third round
Q | (South Africa) M Robertson | 6 | 7
(South Africa) C Steyn | 3 | 6
(France) G Forget | 6 | 6 | 7
(South Africa) E Edwards | 7 | 4 | 6

Fourth round
Q | (South Africa) M Robertson | 3 | 4
(France) G Forget | 6 | 6

==== Section 8 ====
First round
15 | (Ecuador) A Gómez | 6 | 6 | 6
(Spain) E Sánchez | 7 | 3 | 4
(West Germany) R Osterthun | 6 | 6 | 6
(United States) L Duncan | 7 | 3 | 7
WC | (South Africa) D Visser | 6 | 6
Q | (United States) R Brown | 3 | 4
(Brazil) N Aerts | 6 | 6
LL | (United States) R Nixon | 2 | 2
31 | (United States) M Leach | 7 | 6
(Brazil) J Góes | 6 | 4
(Canada) G Michibata | 6 | 6
WC | (Spain) J Avendaño | 3 | 3
(Australia) B Dyke | 6 | 2 | 6
LL | (United States) M Bauer | 1 | 6 | 4
(India) R Krishnan | 1 | 3
2 | (Sweden) M Wilander | 6 | 6

Second round
15 | (Ecuador) A Gómez | 6 | 6
(United States) L Duncan | 4 | 4
WC | (South Africa) D Visser | 6 | 7
(Brazil) N Aerts | 4 | 6
31 | (United States) M Leach | 6 | 6
(Canada) G Michibata | 1 | 3
(Australia) B Dyke | 4 | 2
2 | (Sweden) M Wilander | 6 | 6

Third round
15 | (Ecuador) A Gómez | 6 | 6
WC | (South Africa) D Visser | 3 | 3
31 | (United States) M Leach | 1 | 2
2 | (Sweden) M Wilander | 6 | 6

Fourth round
15 | (Ecuador) A Gómez | 5 | 4
2 | (Sweden) M Wilander | 7 | 6
