= 1986 Lipton International Players Championships – Women's doubles =

Women's doubles
- 1986 Lipton International Players Championships

Final
- Champions: (United States) Pam Shriver (Czechoslovakia) Helena Suková
- Runners-up: (United States) Chris Evert Lloyd (Australia) Wendy Turnbull
- Score: 6–2, 6–3

Details
- Draw: 64
- Seeds: 16

Events
Singles	men	women
Doubles	men	women
- Miami Open

Gigi Fernández and Martina Navratilova were the defending champions, but Navratilova could not compete this year due to a flu. Fernández teamed up with Robin White and lost in the semifinals to Chris Evert Lloyd and Wendy Turnbull.

Pam Shriver and Helena Suková won the title by defeating Evert Lloyd and Turnbull 6–2, 6–3 in the final.

== Seeds ==
1. (United States) Pam Shriver / (Czechoslovakia) Helena Suková (champions)
2. (United States) Kathy Jordan / (Australia) Elizabeth Smylie (third round)
3. (United States) Chris Evert Lloyd / (Australia) Wendy Turnbull (final)
4. (United States) Betsy Nagelsen / (United States) Barbara Potter (second round)
5. (United States) Elise Burgin / (United States) Sharon Walsh (third round)
6. (United States) Gigi Fernández / (United States) Robin White (semifinals)
7. (South Africa) Rosalyn Fairbank / (United States) Candy Reynolds (third round)
8. (United Kingdom) Jo Durie / (Hungary) Andrea Temesvári (second round, retired)
9. (West Germany) Bettina Bunge / (West Germany) Eva Pfaff (third round)
10. (Netherlands) Marcella Mesker / (France) Pascale Paradis (first round)
11. (Sweden) Catarina Lindqvist / (United States) JoAnne Russell (quarterfinals)
12. (Bulgaria) Katerina Maleeva / (Bulgaria) Manuela Maleeva (second round)
13. (Canada) Carling Bassett-Seguso / (Argentina) Gabriela Sabatini (quarterfinals)
14. (United States) Lori McNeil / (France) Catherine Suire (quarterfinals)
15. (West Germany) Steffi Graf / (France) Catherine Tanvier (third round)
16. (United States) Bonnie Gadusek / (United States) Alycia Moulton (second round)

Click on the seed number of a player to go to their draw section.

== Draw ==
Key

- Q = Qualifier
- WC = Wild card
- LL = Lucky loser
- Alt = Alternate
- ITF = ITF entry
- PR = Protected ranking
- SR = Special ranking
- SE = Special exempt
- JE = Junior exempt
- JR = Junior Accelerator Programme entrant
- CO = College Accelerator Programme entrant
- NG = Next Gen Accelerator Program entrant
- w/o = Walkover
- r = Retired
- d = Defaulted

=== Finals ===
Quarterfinals
1	(United States) Pam Shriver (Czechoslovakia) Helena Suková	6	6
13	(Canada) Carling Bassett-Seguso (Argentina) Gabriela Sabatini	1	2
(United States) Zina Garrison (United States) Kathy Rinaldi	6	6
(South Africa) Jennifer Mundel (United States) Molly Van Nostrand	3	4
11	(Sweden) Catarina Lindqvist (United States) JoAnne Russell	3	4
3	(United States) Chris Evert Lloyd (Australia) Wendy Turnbull	6	6
6	(United States) Gigi Fernández (United States) Robin White	6	6
14	(United States) Lori McNeil (France) Catherine Suire	3	4

Semifinals
1	(United States) Pam Shriver (Czechoslovakia) Helena Suková	6	6
(United States) Zina Garrison (United States) Kathy Rinaldi	2	2
3	(United States) Chris Evert Lloyd (Australia) Wendy Turnbull	6	6
6	(United States) Gigi Fernández (United States) Robin White	1	2

Final
1	(United States) Pam Shriver (Czechoslovakia) Helena Suková	6	6
3	(United States) Chris Evert Lloyd (Australia) Wendy Turnbull	2	3

=== Top half ===
==== Section 1 ====
First round
1	(United States) P Shriver (Czechoslovakia) H Suková	6	6
(United States) R Blount (Australia) A Tobin	2	2
(United States) R Casals (Czechoslovakia) R Maršíková	7	1	1
(United States) S Mascarin (United States) T Phelps	6	6	6
(Italy) S Cecchini (Socialist Federal Republic of Yugoslavia) S Goleš	6	6
(Brazil) N Dias (Brazil) P Medrado	1	1
(Australia) D Fromholtz (United States) A Smith	3	6	3
12	(Bulgaria) K Maleeva (Bulgaria) M Maleeva	6	3	6
13	(Canada) C Bassett-Seguso (Argentina) G Sabatini	6	6
(United States) A Henricksson (United States) T Holladay	4	2
(New Zealand) B Cordwell (Australia) L Field	6	7
(United States) L Bonder (United Kingdom) A Croft	3	6
(Australia) S Leo (Australia) P Whytcross	6	5	3
(Czechoslovakia) A Holíková (Czechoslovakia) K Skronská	2	7	6
(United States) T Mochizuki (South Africa) M Reinach	3	3
5	(United States) E Burgin (United States) S Walsh	6	6

Second round
1	(United States) P Shriver (Czechoslovakia) H Suková	1
(United States) S Mascarin (United States) T Phelps	0^{r}
(Italy) S Cecchini (Socialist Federal Republic of Yugoslavia) S Goleš	6	3	6
12	(Bulgaria) K Maleeva (Bulgaria) M Maleeva	1	6	4
13	(Canada) C Bassett-Seguso (Argentina) G Sabatini	7	6	6
(New Zealand) B Cordwell (Australia) L Field	6	7	1
(Czechoslovakia) A Holíková (Czechoslovakia) K Skronská	4	6
5	(United States) E Burgin (United States) S Walsh	6	7

Third round
1	(United States) P Shriver (Czechoslovakia) H Suková	6	6
(Italy) S Cecchini (Socialist Federal Republic of Yugoslavia) S Goleš	4	0
13	(Canada) C Bassett-Seguso (Argentina) G Sabatini	7	7
5	(United States) E Burgin (United States) S Walsh	6	6

Quarterfinals
1	(United States) P Shriver (Czechoslovakia) H Suková	6	6
13	(Canada) C Bassett-Seguso (Argentina) G Sabatini	1	2

==== Section 2 ====
First round
4	(United States) B Nagelsen (United States) B Potter	4	7	7
(United States) C Wilson (United States) P Fendick	6	5	5
(Socialist Federal Republic of Yugoslavia) M Jaušovec (Romania) V Ruzici	2	3
(United States) Z Garrison (United States) K Rinaldi	6	6
(United States) P Casale (United States) E Longo	3	7	5
(France) N Phan-Thanh (Japan) M Yanagi	6	5	7
(United States) A Holton (South Africa) Y Vermaak	5	0
9	(West Germany) B Bunge (West Germany) E Pfaff	7	6
16	(United States) B Gadusek (United States) A Moulton	6	6
(United Kingdom) S Gomer (United States) K Huebner	4	0
(South Africa) J Mundel (United States) M Van Nostrand	7	6
(South Africa) E Reinach (Netherlands) N Schutte	6	4
(United States) D Farrell (United States) J Goodling	5	4
(United States) M Lou Piatek-Daniels (United States) S Rehe	7	6
(Czechoslovakia) I Budařová (Czechoslovakia) M Skuherská	2	7	4
8	(United Kingdom) J Durie (Hungary) A Temesvári	6	6	6

Second round
4	(United States) B Nagelsen (United States) B Potter	6	0	2
(United States) Z Garrison (United States) K Rinaldi	2	6	6
(France) N Phan-Thanh (Japan) M Yanagi	1	4
9	(West Germany) B Bunge (West Germany) E Pfaff	6	6
16	(United States) B Gadusek (United States) A Moulton	3	3
(South Africa) J Mundel (United States) M Van Nostrand	6	6
(United States) M Lou Piatek-Daniels (United States) S Rehe	3	0
8	(United Kingdom) J Durie (Hungary) A Temesvári	6	4^{r}

Third round
(United States) Z Garrison (United States) K Rinaldi	6	6
9	(West Germany) B Bunge (West Germany) E Pfaff	3	4
(South Africa) J Mundel (United States) M Van Nostrand	6	3	6
(United States) M Lou Piatek-Daniels (United States) S Rehe	1	6	4

Quarterfinals
(United States) Z Garrison (United States) K Rinaldi	6	6
(South Africa) J Mundel (United States) M Van Nostrand	3	4

=== Bottom half ===
==== Section 3 ====
First round
7	(South Africa) R Fairbank (United States) C Reynolds	7	7
(Peru) L Arraya (Argentina) A Villagrán	5	5
(Australia) R Bryant (Brazil) C Monteiro	3	6	6
(France) S Amiach (United States) H Ludloff	6	4	4
(Switzerland) E Krapl (United States) V Nelson-Dunbar	2	3
(Argentina) M Paz (United States) P Smith	6	6
(Poland) I Kuczyńska (Australia) B Remilton-Ward	1	1
11	(Sweden) C Lindqvist (United States) J Russell	6	6
10	(Netherlands) M Mesker (France) P Paradis	5	0
(United States) K Horvath (Italy) R Reggi	7	6
(United States) A-M Fernandez (New Zealand) J Richardson	7	6
(United Kingdom) B Borneo (United Kingdom) V Wade	5	2
(Austria) P Huber (West Germany) P Keppeler	0	3
(France) I Demongeot (France) N Tauziat	6	6
(United States) B Gerken (France) N Herreman	3	1
3	(United States) C Evert Lloyd (Australia) W Turnbull	6	6

Second round
7	(South Africa) R Fairbank (United States) C Reynolds	6	6
(Australia) R Bryant (Brazil) C Monteiro	3	1
(Argentina) M Paz (United States) P Smith	2	1
11	(Sweden) C Lindqvist (United States) J Russell	6	6
(United States) K Horvath (Italy) R Reggi	7	2	1
(United States) A-M Fernandez (New Zealand) J Richardson	6	6	6
(France) I Demongeot (France) N Tauziat	1	5
3	(United States) C Evert Lloyd (Australia) W Turnbull	6	7

Third round
7	(South Africa) R Fairbank (United States) C Reynolds	6	6	3
11	(Sweden) C Lindqvist (United States) J Russell	4	7	6
(United States) A-M Fernandez (New Zealand) J Richardson	4	3
3	(United States) C Evert Lloyd (Australia) W Turnbull	6	6

Quarterfinals
11	(Sweden) C Lindqvist (United States) J Russell	3	4
3	(United States) C Evert Lloyd (Australia) W Turnbull	6	6

==== Section 4 ====
First round
6	(United States) G Fernández (United States) R White	7	6
(United States) K McDaniel (United States) W White	6	2
(United States) H Crowe (United States) K Steinmetz	2	3
(Sweden) C Karlsson (Denmark) T Scheuer-Larsen	6	6
(United States) L Antonoplis (United States) B Herr	6	7
(Switzerland) L Drescher (Switzerland) C Jolissaint	3	6
(United States) S Collins (United States) P Louie Harper	3	0
15	(West Germany) S Graf (France) C Tanvier	6	6
14	(United States) L McNeil (France) C Suire	2	6	6
(United States) P Barg (Australia) J Thompson	6	3	3
(United States) M Gurney (United States) M Torres	3	2
(West Germany) A Betzner (West Germany) M Schropp	6	6
(Australia) A Minter (Australia) E Minter	4	2
(United States) C Benjamin (United States) K Sands	6	6
(United States) L Allen (United States) J Kaplan	1	3
2	(United States) K Jordan (Australia) E Smylie	6	6

Second round
6	(United States) G Fernández (United States) R White	6	6
(Sweden) C Karlsson (Denmark) T Scheuer-Larsen	1	1
(United States) L Antonoplis (United States) B Herr	3	5
15	(West Germany) S Graf (France) C Tanvier	6	7
14	(United States) L McNeil (France) C Suire	6	6
(West Germany) A Betzner (West Germany) M Schropp	4	3
(United States) C Benjamin (United States) K Sands	2	6
2	(United States) K Jordan (Australia) E Smylie	6	7

Third round
6	(United States) G Fernández (United States) R White	6	6
15	(West Germany) S Graf (France) C Tanvier	1	1
14	(United States) L McNeil (France) C Suire	6	7
2	(United States) K Jordan (Australia) E Smylie	4	5

Quarterfinals
6	(United States) G Fernández (United States) R White	6	6
14	(United States) L McNeil (France) C Suire	3	4
