= 1991 Fernleaf Butter Classic – Singles =

Singles
- 1991 Fernleaf Butter Classic

Final
- Champion: (Soviet Union) Leila Meskhi
- Runner-up: (Czechoslovakia) Andrea Strnadová
- Score: 3–6, 7–6^{(7–3)}, 6–2

Details
- Draw: 32 (4Q)
- Seeds: 8

Events
Singles	Doubles
← 1990 ·	Wellington Classic	· 1992 →

Wiltrud Probst was the defending champion, but lost in the second round to Louise Field.

Leila Meskhi won the title by defeating Andrea Strnadová 3–6, 7–6^{(7–3)}, 6–2 in the final.

== Seeds ==
1. (Soviet Union) Leila Meskhi (champion)
2. (West Germany) Wiltrud Probst (second round)
3. (Argentina) Mercedes Paz (first round)
4. (West Germany) Sabine Hack (quarterfinals)
5. (Soviet Union) Larisa Savchenko (first round)
6. (Switzerland) Emanuela Zardo (first round)
7. (West Germany) Claudia Porwik (first round)
8. (Hungary) Csilla Bartos (second round)

== Draw ==
=== Key ===
- Q = Qualifier
- WC = Wild card
- LL = Lucky loser
- Alt = Alternate
- SE = Special exempt
- PR = Protected ranking
- ITF = ITF entry
- JE = Junior exempt
- w/o = Walkover
- r = Retired
- d = Defaulted
- SR = Special ranking

=== Finals ===
Semifinals
1	(Soviet Union) Leila Meskhi	6	6
(France) Karine Quentrec	2	3
(Australia) Kristin Godridge	4	6^{3}
(Czechoslovakia) Andrea Strnadová	6	7^{7}

Final
1	(Soviet Union) Leila Meskhi	3	7^{7}	6
(Czechoslovakia) Andrea Strnadová	6	6^{3}	2

=== Top half ===
First round
1	(Soviet Union) L Meskhi	6	6
Q	(Australia) N Pratt	2	2
(United States) Ca MacGregor	6	5	6
(Argentina) C Tessi	3	7	2
(Czechoslovakia) E Švíglerová	6	6
Q	(Finland) N Dahlman	1	1
(Poland) R Baranski	7	4	4
8	(Hungary) C Bartos	5	6	6
4	(West Germany) S Hack	6	7
(New Zealand) C Toleafoa	1	5
(France) N Guerrée	6	6
(Belgium) S Wasserman	1	1
Q	(Netherlands) M Oremans	6	6
(Italy) F Romano	4	2
(France) K Quentrec	6	6
6	(Switzerland) E Zardo	3	2

Second round
1	(Soviet Union) L Meskhi	6	7^{7}
(United States) Ca MacGregor	3	6^{4}
(Czechoslovakia) E Švíglerová	6	7
8	(Hungary) C Bartos	1	5
4	(West Germany) S Hack	6	6
(France) N Guerrée	1	1
Q	(Netherlands) M Oremans	4	6	5
(France) K Quentrec	6	1	7

Quarterfinals
1	(Soviet Union) L Meskhi	6	6
(Czechoslovakia) E Švíglerová	3	4
4	(West Germany) S Hack	6	2	3
(France) K Quentrec	0	6	6

Semifinals
1	(Soviet Union) L Meskhi	6	6
(France) K Quentrec	2	3

=== Bottom half ===
First round
7	(Germany) C Porwik	2	6	5
(Germany) B Rittner	6	2	7
(Sweden) M Strandlund	6	2	6
(United States) S Stafford	1	6	2
(New Zealand) B Cordwell	7	7
(Czechoslovakia) K Habšudová	5	5
(Australia) K Godridge	6	7
3	(Argentina) M Paz	2	5
5	(Soviet Union) L Savchenko	4	6	4
(Czechoslovakia) A Strnadová	6	3	6
(United States) D Faber	3	1
(Australia) A Minter	6	6
Q	(United Kingdom) C Wood	7	6^{5}	5
(Australia) L Field	5	7^{7}	7
(New Zealand) J Richardson	1	6^{4}
2	(Germany) W Probst	6	7^{7}

Second round
(Germany) B Rittner	6	4	6
(Sweden) M Strandlund	3	6	2
(New Zealand) B Cordwell	5	4
(Australia) K Godridge	7	6
(Czechoslovakia) A Strnadová	6	6
(Australia) A Minter	4	1
(Australia) L Field	6	6
2	(Germany) W Probst	4	3

Quarterfinals
(Germany) B Rittner	2	3
(Australia) K Godridge	6	6
(Czechoslovakia) A Strnadová	7^{7}	7
(Australia) L Field	6^{0}	5

Semifinals
(Australia) K Godridge	4	6^{3}
(Czechoslovakia) A Strnadová	6	7^{7}
