= 1990 Fernleaf International Classic =

- Date: 5–11 February
- Edition: 3rd
- Category: Tier V
- Draw: 32S / 16D
- Prize money: $75,000
- Surface: Hard / outdoor
- Location: Wellington, New Zealand

Champions

Singles
- (Germany) Wiltrud Probst

Doubles
- (Soviet Union) Natalia Medvedeva / (Soviet Union) Leila Meskhi
← 1989 ·	Wellington Classic	· 1991 →

The 1990 Fernleaf International Classic was a women's tennis tournament played on outdoor hard courts in Wellington, New Zealand, and was part of the Tier V category of the 1990 WTA Tour. It was the third edition of the tournament and was held from 5 February until 11 February 1990. Sixth-seeded Wiltrud Probst won the singles title.

== Finals ==
=== Singles ===
(Germany) Wiltrud Probst defeated (Soviet Union) Leila Meskhi 1–6, 6–4, 6–0

- It was Probst's first singles title of her career.

=== Doubles ===
(Soviet Union) Natalia Medvedeva / (Soviet Union) Leila Meskhi defeated (Australia) Michelle Jaggard / (New Zealand) Julie Richardson 6–3, 2–6, 6–4

== See also ==
- 1990 BP National Championships – men's tournament
