= 1991 Fernleaf Butter Classic =

- Date: 4–10 February
- Edition: 4th
- Category: Tier V
- Draw: 32S / 16D
- Prize money: $100,000
- Surface: Hard / outdoor
- Location: Wellington, New Zealand
- Venue: Wellington Renouf Tennis Centre

Champions

Singles
- (Soviet Union) Leila Meskhi

Doubles
- (Australia) Jo-Anne Faull / (New Zealand) Julie Richardson
← 1990 ·	Wellington Classic	· 1992 →

The 1991 Fernleaf Butter Classic was a women's tennis tournament played on outdoor hard courts at the Wellington Renouf Tennis Centre in Wellington, New Zealand, and was part of the Tier V category of the 1991 WTA Tour. It was the fourth edition of the tournament and was held from 4 February until 10 February 1991. First-seeded Leila Meskhi won the singles title and earned $18,000 first-prize money.

== Finals ==
=== Singles ===
(Soviet Union) Leila Meskhi defeated (Czechoslovakia) Andrea Strnadová 3–6, 7–6^{(7–3)}, 6–2

- It was Meskhi's 1st singles title of the year and the 4th of her career.

=== Doubles ===
(Australia) Jo-Anne Faull / (New Zealand) Julie Richardson defeated (United Kingdom) Belinda Borneo / (United Kingdom) Clare Wood 2–6, 7–5, 7–6^{(7–4)}

== See also ==
- 1991 BP National Championships – men's tournament
