= 1990 Fernleaf International Classic – Singles =

Singles
- 1990 Fernleaf International Classic

Final
- Champion: (West Germany) Wiltrud Probst
- Runner-up: (Soviet Union) Leila Meskhi
- Score: 1–6, 6–4, 6–0

Details
- Draw: 32 (4Q/2LL)
- Seeds: 8

Events
Singles	Doubles
← 1989 ·	Wellington Classic	· 1991 →

Conchita Martínez was the defending champion, but did not compete this year.

Wiltrud Probst won the title by defeating Leila Meskhi 1–6, 6–4, 6–0 in the final.

== Seeds ==
1. (New Zealand) Belinda Cordwell (first round)
2. (Soviet Union) Leila Meskhi (final)
3. (United States) Donna Faber (second round)
4. (Soviet Union) Natalia Medvedeva (second round)
5. (Belgium) Sandra Wasserman (quarterfinals)
6. (West Germany) Wiltrud Probst (champion)
7. (n/a)
8. (Australia) Louise Field (second round)

== Draw ==
=== Key ===
- Q = Qualifier
- WC = Wild card
- LL = Lucky loser
- Alt = Alternate
- SE = Special exempt
- PR = Protected ranking
- ITF = ITF entry
- JE = Junior exempt
- w/o = Walkover
- r = Retired
- d = Defaulted
- SR = Special ranking

=== Finals ===
Semifinals
6	(West Germany) Wiltrud Probst	6	6
(Belgium) Sabine Appelmans	4	2
(New Zealand) Claudine Toleafoa	4	4
2	(Soviet Union) Leila Meskhi	6	6

Final
6	(West Germany) Wiltrud Probst	1	6	6
2	(Soviet Union) Leila Meskhi	6	4	0

=== Top half ===
First round
1	(New Zealand) B Cordwell	6	1	2
(New Zealand) J Richardson	4	6	6
(Japan) Y Koizumi	6	2
(Switzerland) E Zardo	7	6
(Switzerland) E Krapl	2	4
(Czechoslovakia) A Strnadová	6	6
(Hungary) C Bartos	0	4
6	(West Germany) W Probst	6	6
4	(Soviet Union) N Medvedeva	6	6
(Canada) M Drake	1	1
(Belgium) S Appelmans	6	6
(Netherlands) C Bakkum	2	0
(Australia) R Stubbs	2	2
Q	(Bulgaria) M Maleeva	6	6
Q	(Australia) T Morton	6	4	1
8	(Australia) L Field	2	6	6

Second round
(New Zealand) J Richardson	6	3
(Switzerland) E Zardo	7	6
(Czechoslovakia) A Strnadová	7	1	0
6	(West Germany) W Probst	5	6	6
4	(Soviet Union) N Medvedeva	0	0
(Belgium) S Appelmans	6	6
Q	(Bulgaria) M Maleeva	7	3	6
8	(Australia) L Field	5	6	1

Quarterfinals
(Switzerland) E Zardo	5	3
6	(West Germany) W Probst	7	6
(Belgium) S Appelmans	6	7
Q	(Bulgaria) M Maleeva	1	5

Semifinals
6	(West Germany) W Probst	6	6
(Belgium) S Appelmans	4	2

=== Bottom half ===
First round
5	(Belgium) S Wasserman	6	6
(Australia) K Godridge	4	1
(West Germany) S Frankl	6	6
(Finland) P Thorén	2	4
Q	(West Germany) EM Schürhoff	3	6	6
(New Zealand) C Toleafoa	6	1	7
(Australia) L O'Neill	3	6	1
3	(United States) D Faber	6	3	6
(Australia) M Jaggard	5	2
(United Kingdom) C Wood	7	6
(Austria) B Reinstadler	6	6
LL	(Netherlands) S Schilder	2	3
(West Germany) A Huber	6	0	6
Q	(United Kingdom) S Loosemore	4	6	2
LL	(Israel) Y Segal	0	2
2	(Soviet Union) L Meskhi	6	6

Second round
5	(Belgium) S Wasserman	7	6
(West Germany) S Frankl	5	1
(New Zealand) C Toleafoa	7	6
3	(United States) D Faber	5	2
(United Kingdom) C Wood	4	6	4
(Austria) B Reinstadler	6	4	6
(West Germany) A Huber	5	2
2	(Soviet Union) L Meskhi	7	6

Quarterfinals
5	(Belgium) S Wasserman	7	2	1
(New Zealand) C Toleafoa	6	6	6
(Austria) B Reinstadler	4	0
2	(Soviet Union) L Meskhi	6	6

Semifinals
(New Zealand) C Toleafoa	4	4
2	(Soviet Union) L Meskhi	6	6
