= 1992 Fernleaf Butter Classic – Doubles =

Doubles
- 1992 Fernleaf Butter Classic

Final
- Champions: (United Kingdom) Belinda Borneo (United Kingdom) Clare Wood
- Runners-up: (Australia) Jo-Anne Faull (New Zealand) Julie Richardson
- Score: 6–0, 7–6^{(7–5)}

Details
- Draw: 16 (1Q)
- Seeds: 4

Events
Singles	Doubles
← 1991 ·	Wellington Classic

Jo-Anne Faull and Julie Richardson were the defending champions, but lost in the final to Belinda Borneo and Clare Wood. The score was 6–0, 7–6^{(7–5)}.

== Seeds ==
1. (Canada) Jill Hetherington / (United States) Kathy Rinaldi (semifinals)
2. (United Kingdom) Belinda Borneo / (United Kingdom) Clare Wood (champions)
3. (Australia) Jo-Anne Faull / (New Zealand) Julie Richardson (final)
4. (Mexico) Lupita Novelo / (Australia) Kristine Radford (semifinals)

== Draw ==
=== Key ===
- Q = Qualifier
- WC = Wild card
- LL = Lucky loser
- Alt = Alternate
- SE = Special exempt
- PR = Protected ranking
- ITF = ITF entry
- JE = Junior exempt
- w/o = Walkover
- r = Retired
- d = Defaulted
- SR = Special ranking

=== Draw ===
First round
1	(Canada) J Hetherington (United States) K Rinaldi	6	6
(United States) D Faber (United States) R Jensen	4	2
(Australia) K Godridge (Australia) L Stacey	6	6
(Germany) S Hack (Germany) V Martinek	0	1
3	(Australia) JA Faull (New Zealand) J Richardson	6	6
(United States) A Grossman (United Kingdom) M Javer	4	4
Q	(United States) S Martin (United States) E Rossides	6^{7}	6	4
(New Zealand) C Toleafoa (New Zealand) Amanda Trail	7^{9}	3	6
(Germany) R Kochta (Australia) C Thompson	0	3
(United States) C Benjamin (Australia) K Sharpe	6	6
(United States) P O'Reilly (United States) Terri O'Reilly	2	3
4	(Mexico) L Novelo (Australia) K Radford	6	6
(France) A Fusai (France) N van Lottum	6	6
(Finland) N Dahlman (Czechoslovakia) D Szabová	2	3
(New Zealand) Anne-Sophie Bruner (New Zealand) Paiao-Asinata Short	0	0
2	(United Kingdom) B Borneo (United Kingdom) C Wood	6	6

Quarterfinals
1	(Canada) J Hetherington (United States) K Rinaldi	6	6
(Australia) K Godridge (Australia) L Stacey	3	1
3	(Australia) JA Faull (New Zealand) J Richardson	6	6
(New Zealand) C Toleafoa (New Zealand) Amanda Trail	3	4
(United States) C Benjamin (Australia) K Sharpe	6	4	2
4	(Mexico) L Novelo (Australia) K Radford	4	6	6
(France) A Fusai (France) N van Lottum	1	4
2	(United Kingdom) B Borneo (United Kingdom) C Wood	6	6

Semifinals
1	(Canada) J Hetherington (United States) K Rinaldi	4	5
3	(Australia) JA Faull (New Zealand) J Richardson	6	7
4	(Mexico) L Novelo (Australia) K Radford	3	2
2	(United Kingdom) B Borneo (United Kingdom) C Wood	6	6

Final
3	(Australia) JA Faull (New Zealand) J Richardson	0	6^{5}
2	(United Kingdom) B Borneo (United Kingdom) C Wood	6	7^{7}
