= 1992 Fernleaf Butter Classic – Singles =

Singles
- 1992 Fernleaf Butter Classic

Final
- Champion: (France) Noëlle van Lottum
- Runner-up: (United States) Donna Faber
- Score: 6–4, 6–0

Details
- Draw: 32 (4Q/3WC)
- Seeds: 8

Events
Singles	Doubles
← 1991 ·	Wellington Classic

Leila Meskhi was the defending champion, but did not compete this year.

Noëlle van Lottum won the title by defeating Donna Faber 6–4, 6–0 in the final.

== Seeds ==
1. (Czechoslovakia) Andrea Strnadová (first round, retired)
2. (Germany) Sabine Hack (second round)
3. (Latvia) Larisa Savchenko-Neiland (first round)
4. (Italy) Raffaella Reggi-Concato (first round)
5. (Germany) Veronika Martinek (first round)
6. (United States) Ann Grossman (semifinals)
7. (United States) Kathy Rinaldi (first round)
8. (Australia) Kristin Godridge (first round)

== Draw ==
=== Key ===
- Q = Qualifier
- WC = Wild card
- LL = Lucky loser
- Alt = Alternate
- SE = Special exempt
- PR = Protected ranking
- ITF = ITF entry
- JE = Junior exempt
- w/o = Walkover
- r = Retired
- d = Defaulted
- SR = Special ranking

=== Finals ===
Semifinals
(France) Noëlle van Lottum	7^{8}	6
(United Kingdom) Monique Javer	6^{6}	4
6	(United States) Ann Grossman	4	5
(United States) Donna Faber	6	7

Final
(France) Noëlle van Lottum	6	6
(United States) Donna Faber	4	0

=== Top half ===
First round
1	(Czechoslovakia) A Strnadová	1	6	0^{r}
(Australia) JA Faull	6	2	3
(Finland) N Dahlman	7	6
(Socialist Federal Republic of Yugoslavia) N Ercegović	5	3
(United States) S Martin	6	3	6
(Australia) L Stacey	3	6	4
(France) N van Lottum	7	6
8	(Australia) K Godridge	5	4
4	(Italy) R Reggi-Concato	4	7^{7}	3
(United Kingdom) S Gomer	6	6^{3}	6
Q	(United States) E Rossides	2	6^{4}
(United Kingdom) C Wood	6	7^{7}
WC	(Canada) J Hetherington	6	3	4
(Czechoslovakia) D Szabová	4	6	6
(United Kingdom) M Javer	6	6
5	(Germany) V Martinek	3	1

Second round
(Australia) JA Faull	6	3	6
(Finland) N Dahlman	4	6	4
(United States) S Martin	2	2
(France) N van Lottum	6	6
(United Kingdom) S Gomer	6	4	3
(United Kingdom) C Wood	4	6	6
(Czechoslovakia) D Szabová	3	0
(United Kingdom) M Javer	6	6

Quarterfinals
(Australia) JA Faull	4	6	6^{7}
(France) N van Lottum	6	4	7^{9}
(United Kingdom) C Wood	4	6^{4}
(United Kingdom) M Javer	6	7^{7}

Semifinals
(France) N van Lottum	7^{8}	6
(United Kingdom) M Javer	6^{6}	4

=== Bottom half ===
First round
6	(United States) A Grossman	6	7
(Israel) I Berger	0	5
Q	(Israel) A Smashnova	7^{7}	3	6
Q	(United States) R Jensen	6^{3}	6	3
Q	(United States) P O'Reilly	7^{7}	6
WC	(New Zealand) J Richardson	6^{2}	2
WC	(New Zealand) C Toleafoa	3	7	6
3	(Latvia) L Savchenko-Neiland	6	5	4
7	(United States) K Rinaldi	3	6	3
(Australia) L Field	6	4	6
(United States) C Benjamin	6^{3}	1
(Australia) K Radford	7^{7}	6
(France) A Fusai	2	1
(United States) D Faber	6	6
(Germany) I Cueto	3	2
2	(Germany) S Hack	6	6

Second round
6	(United States) A Grossman	6	4	6
Q	(Israel) A Smashnova	4	6	1
Q	(United States) P O'Reilly	6	3	5
WC	(New Zealand) C Toleafoa	3	6	7
(Australia) L Field	3	6	6
(Australia) K Radford	6	3	2
(United States) D Faber	7	3	6
2	(Germany) S Hack	5	6	0

Quarterfinals
6	(United States) A Grossman	7^{7}	2	7
WC	(New Zealand) C Toleafoa	6^{4}	6	5
(Australia) L Field	3	2
(United States) D Faber	6	6

Semifinals
6	(United States) A Grossman	4	5
(United States) D Faber	6	7
