= 1990 Fernleaf International Classic – Doubles =

Doubles
- 1990 Fernleaf International Classic

Final
- Champions: (Soviet Union) Natalia Medvedeva (Soviet Union) Leila Meskhi
- Runners-up: (Australia) Michelle Jaggard (New Zealand) Julie Richardson
- Score: 6–3, 2–6, 6–4

Details
- Draw: 16
- Seeds: 4

Events
Singles	Doubles
← 1989 ·	Wellington Classic	· 1991 →

Elizabeth Smylie and Janine Tremelling were the defending champions, but none competed this year.

Natalia Medvedeva and Leila Meskhi won the title by defeating Michelle Jaggard and Julie Richardson 6–3, 2–6, 6–4 in the final.

== Seeds ==
1. (Soviet Union) Natalia Medvedeva / (Soviet Union) Leila Meskhi (champions)
2. (New Zealand) Belinda Cordwell / (Australia) Louise Field (semifinals)
3. (Netherlands) Carin Bakkum / (Netherlands) Simone Schilder (first round)
4. (Australia) Michelle Jaggard / (New Zealand) Julie Richardson (final)

== Draw ==
=== Key ===
- Q = Qualifier
- WC = Wild card
- LL = Lucky loser
- Alt = Alternate
- SE = Special exempt
- PR = Protected ranking
- ITF = ITF entry
- JE = Junior exempt
- w/o = Walkover
- r = Retired
- d = Defaulted
- SR = Special ranking

=== Draw ===
First round
1	(Soviet Union) N Medvedeva (Soviet Union) L Meskhi	6	6
(Belgium) S Appelmans (Belgium) S Wasserman	2	3
(United Kingdom) S Loosemore (United Kingdom) A Simpkin	6	7
(West Germany) S Frankl (West Germany) EM Schürhoff	2	5
3	(Netherlands) C Bakkum (Netherlands) S Schilder	3	6
(Australia) M Bowrey (New Zealand) C Toleafoa	6	7
(Sweden) M Ekstrand (Denmark) L Vandborg	6	5	2
(United States) D Faber (Brazil) T Zambrzycki	1	7	6
(West Germany) W Probst (United Kingdom) C Wood	5	6	2
(West Germany) A Huber (Switzerland) M Maleeva-Fragnière	7	4	6
(Australia) K Godridge (New Zealand) R Seeman	3	7	3
4	(Australia) M Jaggard (New Zealand) J Richardson	6	6	6
(Austria) B Reinstadler (Finland) P Thorén	6	7
(Australia) D Jones (Australia) Sharon McNamara	4	6
(Australia) T Morton (Australia) R Stubbs	4	2
2	(New Zealand) B Cordwell (Australia) L Field	6	6

Quarterfinals
1	(Soviet Union) N Medvedeva (Soviet Union) L Meskhi	6	7
(United Kingdom) S Loosemore (United Kingdom) A Simpkin	4	6
(Australia) M Bowrey (New Zealand) C Toleafoa	6	7	6
(United States) D Faber (Brazil) T Zambrzycki	7	5	2
(West Germany) A Huber (Switzerland) M Maleeva-Fragnière	4	5
4	(Australia) M Jaggard (New Zealand) J Richardson	6	7
(Austria) B Reinstadler (Finland) P Thorén	1	4
2	(New Zealand) B Cordwell (Australia) L Field	6	6

Semifinals
1	(Soviet Union) N Medvedeva (Soviet Union) L Meskhi	6	7
(Australia) M Bowrey (New Zealand) C Toleafoa	4	6
4	(Australia) M Jaggard (New Zealand) J Richardson	6	6
2	(New Zealand) B Cordwell (Australia) L Field	2	3

Final
1	(Soviet Union) N Medvedeva (Soviet Union) L Meskhi	6	2	6
4	(Australia) M Jaggard (New Zealand) J Richardson	3	6	4
