= 1988 BP National Championships =

- Date: 28 December 1987 – 3 January 1988
- Edition: 1st
- Category: Grand Prix
- Draw: 32S / 16D
- Prize money: $115,000
- Surface: Hard / outdoor
- Location: Wellington, New Zealand

Champions

Singles
- (India) Ramesh Krishnan

Doubles
- (United States) Dan Goldie / (United States) Rick Leach
- BP National Championships

The 1988 BP National Championships was a men's tennis tournament played on outdoor hard courts in Wellington in New Zealand that was part of the 1988 Nabisco Grand Prix. It was the inaugural edition of the tournament and was held from 28 December 1987 through 3 January 1988. Sixth-seeded Ramesh Krishnan won the singles title.

== Finals ==
=== Singles ===
(India) Ramesh Krishnan defeated (Soviet Union) Andrei Chesnokov 6–7, 6–0, 6–4, 6–3

- It was Krishnan's only title of the year and the 7th of his career.

=== Doubles ===
(United States) Dan Goldie / (United States) Rick Leach defeated (Australia) Broderick Dyke / (Canada) Glenn Michibata 6–2, 6–3

- It was Goldie's 1st title of the year and the 3rd of his career. It was Leach's 1st title of the year and the 3rd of his career.

== See also ==
- 1988 Fernleaf Classic – women's tournament
