= 1991 BP National Championships =

- Date: 31 December 1990 – 6 January 1991
- Edition: 4th
- Category: World Series
- Draw: 32S / 16D
- Prize money: $150,000
- Surface: Hard / outdoor
- Location: Wellington, New Zealand

Champions

Singles
- (Australia) Richard Fromberg

Doubles
- (Brazil) Luiz Mattar / (Venezuela) Nicolás Pereira
- BP National Championships

The 1991 BP National Championships was a men's tennis tournament played on outdoor hard courts in Wellington in New Zealand and was part of the World Series of the 1991 ATP Tour. It was the fourth edition of the tournament and was held from 31 December 1990 through 6 January 1991. Third-seeded Richard Fromberg won the singles title.

== Finals ==
=== Singles ===
(Australia) Richard Fromberg defeated (Sweden) Lars Jönsson 6–1, 6–4, 6–4

- It was Fromberg's 1st singles title of the year and the 3rd of his career.

=== Doubles ===
(Brazil) Luiz Mattar / (Venezuela) Nicolás Pereira defeated (United States) John Letts / (Brazil) Jaime Oncins 4–6, 7–6, 6–2

== See also ==
- 1991 Fernleaf Butter Classic – women's tournament
