= Rill Baxter =

American tennis player

- Country (sports): United States
- Born: October 26, 1962 (age 63) Sarasota, Florida
- Height: 6 ft 0 in (183 cm)
- Plays: Right-handed
- Prize money: $63,445

Singles
- Career record: 0–1
- Highest ranking: No. 316 (April 20, 1987)

Doubles
- Career record: 34–65
- Highest ranking: No. 69 (August 17, 1987)

Grand Slam doubles results
- Australian Open: 1R (1989)
- French Open: 2R (1987)
- Wimbledon: 2R (1987)
- US Open: 2R (1981)

Grand Slam mixed doubles results
- French Open: 2R (1987)
- Wimbledon: 1R (1987)
- US Open: 1R (1987)

Rill Baxter (born October 26, 1962) is a former professional tennis player from the United States.

Baxter enjoyed most of his tennis success while playing doubles. During his career he finished runner-up at 2 doubles events. He achieved a career-high doubles ranking of World No. 69 in 1987. Baxter was on the Pepperdine University men's tennis team from 1980-1984.

== Career finals ==
=== Doubles (2 runner-ups) ===
Result	W/L	Date	Tournament	Surface	Partner	Opponents	Score
Loss	0–1	Feb 1988	Metz, France	Carpet	(Nigeria) Nduka Odizor	(Czech Republic) Jaroslav Navrátil (Netherlands) Tom Nijssen	2–6, 7–6, 6–7
Loss	0–2	Jan 1989	Wellington, New Zealand	Hard	(Canada) Glenn Michibata	(Australia) Peter Doohan (Australia) Laurie Warder	6–3, 2–6, 3–6
