= BP National Championships =

Defunct tennis tournament
- Event name: BP National Championships (1988–92); Wellington Challenger (1993–95)
- Tour: Grand Prix circuit (1988–89); ATP Tour (1990–92); Challenger Series (1993–95)
- Founded: 1988
- Abolished: 1995
- Editions: 8
- Surface: Hard / outdoor

The BP National Championships was a Grand Prix and ATP Tour tennis tournament played from 1988 to 1995. It was held in Wellington in New Zealand and was played on outdoor hard courts.

The tournament began as part of the Regular Series of the Grand Prix before joining the World Series of the ATP Tour when it was formed in 1990. After the tournament was replaced by the Qatar Open in 1993 it became a part of the ATP Challenger Series before being wound up in 1995.

== Results ==
=== Key ===
Grand Prix / ATP Tour
Challenger

=== Singles ===
Year	Champions	Runners-up	Score
1988	(India) Ramesh Krishnan	(Soviet Union) Andrei Chesnokov	6–7, 6–0, 6–4, 6–3
1989	(New Zealand) Kelly Evernden	(Japan) Shuzo Matsuoka	7–5, 6–1, 6–4
1990	(Spain) Emilio Sánchez	(United States) Richey Reneberg	6–7, 6–4, 4–6, 6–4, 6–1
1991	(Australia) Richard Fromberg	(Sweden) Lars Jönsson	6–1, 6–4, 6–4
1992	(United States) Jeff Tarango	(Commonwealth of Independent States) Alexander Volkov	6–1, 6–0, 6–3
1993	(Zimbabwe) Byron Black	(United States) Tommy Ho	6–4, 4–6, 6–1
1994	(Australia) Todd Woodbridge	(Germany) Hendrik Dreekmann	6–3, 6–3
1995	(New Zealand) Brett Steven	(Czech Republic) Martin Damm	6–3, 6–3

=== Doubles ===
Year	Champions	Runners-up	Score
1988	(United States) Dan Goldie (United States) Rick Leach	(Australia) Broderick Dyke (Canada) Glenn Michibata	6–2, 6–3
1989	(Australia) Peter Doohan (Australia) Laurie Warder	(United States) Rill Baxter (Canada) Glenn Michibata	3–6, 6–2, 6–3
1990	(New Zealand) Kelly Evernden (Venezuela) Nicolás Pereira	(Spain) Sergio Casal (Spain) Emilio Sánchez	6–4, 7–6
1991	(Brazil) Luiz Mattar (Venezuela) Nicolás Pereira	(United States) John Letts (Brazil) Jaime Oncins	4–6, 7–6, 6–2
1992	(United States) Jared Palmer (United States) Jonathan Stark	(Netherlands) Michiel Schapers (Czech Republic) Daniel Vacek	6–3, 6–3
1993	(United States) Paul Annacone (Zimbabwe) Byron Black	(The Bahamas) Mark Knowles (The Bahamas) Roger Smith	6–2, 7–6
1994	(United States) Martin Blackman (United States) Kenny Thorne	(Australia) Sandon Stolle (Australia) Simon Youl	6–7, 6–3, 6–3
1995	(The Bahamas) Mark Knowles (Canada) Daniel Nestor	(United States) Tommy Ho (United States) Kenny Thorne	2–6, 6–4, 7–6

== Notes ==
This tournament is distinct from the New Zealand National Lawn Tennis Championships event that was first played in Auckland in 1886 which was also known as the New Zealand Lawn Tennis Association Championships. That tournament later became known as the New Zealand Championships that was held until 2020 all of which have different rolls of winners to this one.

== See also ==
- ATP Auckland Open
- New Zealand National Lawn Tennis Championships
- New Zealand Lawn Tennis Association Championships
