= Kelly Evernden =

New Zealand tennis player

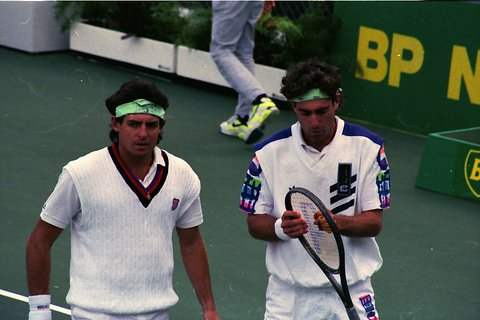
- Full name: Kelly Graeme Evernden
- Country (sports): New Zealand
- Residence: Seattle, Washington, United States
- Born: 21 September 1961 (age 64) Gisborne, New Zealand
- Height: 1.75 m (5 ft 9 in)
- Turned pro: 1985
- Retired: 1995
- Plays: Right-handed (one handed-backhand)
- Prize money: $896,750

Singles
- Career record: 135–146
- Career titles: 3
- Highest ranking: No. 31 (6 November 1989)

Grand Slam singles results
- Australian Open: QF (1987)
- French Open: 1R (1991)
- Wimbledon: 3R (1987)
- US Open: 3R (1985, 1987)

Other tournaments
- Olympic Games: 2R (1988)

Doubles
- Career record: 147–147
- Career titles: 5
- Highest ranking: No. 19 (18 July 1988)

Grand Slam doubles results
- Australian Open: QF (1988)
- French Open: 2R (1987, 1988)
- Wimbledon: QF (1988, 1991)
- US Open: QF (1992)

Other doubles tournaments
- Olympic Games: 2R (1988)

Grand Slam mixed doubles results
- Australian Open: QF (1991)
- Wimbledon: 3R (1987)
- US Open: SF (1990)
- Last updated on: 22 August 2022.

Kelly Graeme Evernden (born 21 September 1961) is a former professional tennis player from New Zealand.

Evernden turned professional in 1985 and won his first tour doubles title in 1986 at Cologne. His first top-level singles title came in 1987 at Bristol. His best singles performance at a Grand Slam event came at the 1987 Australian Open, where he reached the quarter-finals by defeating Jonathan Canter, Johan Kriek, Brad Pearce and Derrick Rostagno before being knocked-out by Wally Masur. Evernden represented New Zealand at the 1988 Olympic Games in Seoul.

Over the course of his career, Evernden won three top-level singles titles, the last of which was won in 1989 at Wellington. He also won five tour doubles titles (the most significant of which was the Canadian Open in 1989). Evernden's career-high rankings were world No. 31 in singles and world No. 19 in doubles. He retired from the professional tour in 1994.

Evernden played pro tennis with only one lung, having had a lung removed as the result of an injury sustained in an accident at the age of 16. He was hit by a motorist and his heart stopped twice in five days (once for one minute and once for 45 seconds). In addition to puncturing a lung which had to be removed, he also had a broken arm, leg and ribs, however he recovered fully from the accident.

He lives on Mercer Island with his wife and two sons.

Prior to turning professional, Evernden played tennis for the University of Arkansas (where he studied business management and psychology) and was an All-American in 1984.

Evernden is a quarter Ngāti Porou Māori, and his Māori name "Te Rangai" means "Young Warrior". His Irish name, Kelly, means "War". Kelly was the Davis Cup Captain for New Zealand (2021-2024).

== ATP career finals ==
=== Singles: 7 (3 titles, 4 runner-ups) ===
Legend Grand Slam Tournaments (0–0) ATP World Tour Finals (0–0) ATP Masters 1000 Series (0–0) ATP 500 Series (0–0) ATP 250 Series (3–4)	Finals by surface Hard (2–1) Clay (0–0) Grass (1–1) Carpet (0–2)	Finals by setting Outdoors (2–2) Indoors (1–2)

Result	W–L	Date	Tournament	Tier	Surface	Opponent	Score
Loss	0–1	Oct 1985	Brisbane, Australia	Grand Prix	Carpet	(United States) Paul Annacone	3–6, 3–6
Loss	0–2	Dec 1985	Sydney, Australia	Grand Prix	Grass	(France) Henri Leconte	7–6^{(8–6)}, 2–6, 3–6
Win	1–2	Jun 1987	Bristol, United Kingdom	Grand Prix	Grass	(United States) Tim Wilkison	6–4, 7–6
Win	2–2	Oct 1987	Brisbane, Australia	Grand Prix	Hard	(Germany) Eric Jelen	3–6, 6–1, 6–1
Win	3–2	Jan 1989	Wellington, New Zealand	Grand Prix	Hard	(Japan) Shuzo Matsuoka	7–5, 6–1, 6–4
Loss	3–3	Oct 1989	Vienna, Austria	Grand Prix	Carpet	(United States) Paul Annacone	7–6^{(7–5)}, 4–6, 1–6, 6–2, 3–6
Loss	3–4	Aug 1990	Schenectady, United States	World Series	Hard	(India) Ramesh Krishnan	1–6, 1–6

=== Doubles: 8 (5 titles, 3 runner-ups) ===
Legend Grand Slam Tournaments (0–0) ATP World Tour Finals (0–0) ATP Masters 1000 Series (1–0) ATP 500 Series (0–0) ATP 250 Series (4–3)	Finals by surface Hard (4–2) Clay (0–0) Grass (0–0) Carpet (1–1)	Finals by setting Outdoors (2–1) Indoors (3–1)

Result	W–L	Date	Tournament	Tier	Surface	Partner	Opponents	Score
Win	1–0	Apr 1986	Cologne, West Germany	Grand Prix	Hard	(United States) Chip Hooper	(Sweden) Jan Gunnarsson (Sweden) Peter Lundgren	6–4, 6–7, 6–3
Win	2–0	Oct 1987	Brisbane, Australia	Grand Prix	Hard	(United States) Matt Anger	(Australia) Broderick Dyke (Australia) Wally Masur	7–6, 6–2
Win	3–0	Feb 1988	Philadelphia, United States	Grand Prix	Carpet	(South Africa) Johan Kriek	(United States) Kevin Curren (South Africa) Danie Visser	7–6, 6–3
Loss	3–1	Aug 1989	Livingston, United States	Grand Prix	Hard	(United States) Sammy Giammalva Jr.	(United States) Tim Pawsat (United States) Tim Wilkison	5–7, 3–6
Win	4–1	Aug 1989	Montreal, Canada	Grand Prix	Hard	(United States) Todd Witsken	(United States) Charles Beckman (United States) Shelby Cannon	6–3, 6–3
Loss	4–2	Oct 1989	Vienna, Austria	Grand Prix	Carpet	(United States) Paul Annacone	(Sweden) Jan Gunnarsson (Sweden) Anders Järryd	2–6, 3–6
Win	5–2	Jan 1989	Wellington, New Zealand	Grand Prix	Hard	(Venezuela) Nicolás Pereira	(Spain) Sergio Casal (Spain) Emilio Sánchez Vicario	6–4, 7–6
Loss	5–3	Apr 1992	Seoul, South Korea	World Series	Hard	(United States) Brad Pearce	(United States) Kevin Curren (South Africa) Gary Muller	6–7, 4–6

== ATP Challenger and ITF Futures finals ==
=== Singles: 1 (0–1) ===
Legend ATP Challenger (0–1) ITF Futures (0–0)	Finals by surface Hard (0–1) Clay (0–0) Grass (0–0) Carpet (0–0)

Result	W–L	Date	Tournament	Tier	Surface	Opponent	Score
Loss	0–1	Oct 1991	Ponte Vedra, United States	Challenger	Hard	(United States) Jonathan Stark	3–6, 1–6

=== Doubles: 1 (0–1) ===
Legend ATP Challenger (0–1) ITF Futures (0–0)	Finals by surface Hard (0–0) Clay (0–1) Grass (0–0) Carpet (0–0)

Result	W–L	Date	Tournament	Tier	Surface	Partner	Opponents	Score
Loss	0–1	Jun 1992	Halle, Germany	Challenger	Clay	(New Zealand) Brett Steven	(Germany) Karsten Braasch (Germany) Lars Koslowski	6–4, 6–7, 0–6

== Performance timelines ==
Key
W	F	SF	QF	#R	RR	Q#	DNQ	A	NH

(W) winner; (F) finalist; (SF) semifinalist; (QF) quarterfinalist; (#R) rounds 4, 3, 2, 1; (RR) round-robin stage; (Q#) qualification round; (DNQ) did not qualify; (A) absent; (NH) not held; (SR) strike rate (events won / competed); (W–L) win–loss record.

=== Singles ===
Tournament	1983	1984	1985	1986	1987	1988	1989	1990	1991	1992	1993	SR	W–L	Win %
Grand Slam tournaments
Australian Open	Q3	A	1R	A	QF	1R	2R	1R	1R	A	A	0 / 6	5–6	45%
French Open	A	A	A	A	A	A	A	A	1R	A	A	0 / 1	0–1	0%
Wimbledon	A	A	2R	1R	3R	2R	1R	1R	1R	A	A	0 / 7	4–7	36%
US Open	A	A	3R	1R	3R	1R	1R	1R	1R	Q1	Q1	0 / 7	4–7	36%
Win–loss	0–0	0–0	3–3	0–2	8–3	1–3	1–3	0–3	0–4	0–0	0–0	0 / 21	13–21	38%
National Representation
Summer Olympics	NH	A	Not Held			2R	Not Held			A	NH	0 / 1	1–1	50%
ATP Masters Series
Indian Wells	A	A	A	A	A	1R	A	A	A	A	A	0 / 1	0–1	0%
Miami	A	A	A	1R	A	1R	2R	1R	1R	A	A	0 / 5	1–5	17%
Canada	A	A	A	A	3R	2R	3R	1R	A	A	A	0 / 4	5–4	56%
Cincinnati	A	A	A	A	3R	1R	A	A	A	A	A	0 / 2	2–2	50%
Win–loss	0–0	0–0	0–0	0–1	4–2	1–4	3–2	0–2	0–1	0–0	0–0	0 / 12	8–12	40%

=== Doubles ===
Tournament	1985	1986	1987	1988	1989	1990	1991	1992	1993	SR	W–L	Win %
Grand Slam tournaments
Australian Open	2R	A	2R	QF	1R	2R	2R	A	1R	0 / 7	7–7	50%
French Open	1R	A	2R	2R	A	A	1R	1R	A	0 / 5	2–5	29%
Wimbledon	3R	3R	1R	QF	2R	2R	QF	A	A	0 / 7	12–7	63%
US Open	2R	2R	2R	2R	2R	1R	1R	QF	A	0 / 8	8–8	50%
Win–loss	4–4	3–2	3–4	8–4	2–3	2–3	4–4	3–2	0–1	0 / 27	29–27	52%
National Representation
Summer Olympics	Not Held			2R	Not Held			A	NH	0 / 1	1–1	50%
ATP Masters Series
Indian Wells	A	A	A	QF	A	A	A	A	A	0 / 1	2–1	67%
Miami	A	2R	1R	3R	2R	1R	2R	A	A	0 / 6	5–6	45%
Rome	1R	A	A	A	A	A	A	A	A	0 / 1	0–1	0%
Canada	1R	A	1R	QF	W	2R	A	A	A	1 / 5	8–4	67%
Cincinnati	A	A	1R	A	A	A	A	A	A	0 / 1	0–1	0%
Paris	A	A	A	1R	A	A	A	A	A	0 / 1	0–1	0%
Win–loss	0–2	1–1	0–3	6–4	6–1	1–2	1–1	0–0	0–0	1 / 15	15–14	52%

=== Mixed Doubles ===
Tournament	1986	1987	1988	1989	1990	1991	SR	W–L	Win %
Grand Slam tournaments
Australian Open	A	1R	2R	1R	A	QF	0 / 4	3–4	43%
French Open	A	A	A	A	A	A	0 / 0	0–0	–
Wimbledon	1R	3R	2R	A	A	2R	0 / 4	4–4	50%
US Open	A	A	A	A	SF	A	0 / 1	3–1	75%
Win–loss	8–1	2–2	2–2	0–1	3–1	3–2	0 / 9	10–9	53%
