= 1988 Lipton International Players Championships – Men's doubles =

Men's doubles
- 1988 Lipton International Players Championships

Final
- Champions: (Australia) John Fitzgerald (Sweden) Anders Järryd
- Runners-up: (United States) Ken Flach (United States) Robert Seguso
- Score: 7–6, 6–1, 7–5

Details
- Draw: 64
- Seeds: 16

Events
Singles	men	women
Doubles	men	women
← 1987 ·	Miami Open	· 1989 →

Paul Annacone and Christo van Rensburg were the defending champions but lost in the semifinals to John Fitzgerald and Anders Järryd.

Fitzgerald and Järryd won in the final 7–6, 6–1, 7–5 against Ken Flach and Robert Seguso.

== Seeds ==
1. (United States) Ken Flach / (United States) Robert Seguso (final)
2. (Czechoslovakia) Miloslav Mečíř / (Czechoslovakia) Tomáš Šmíd (third round)
3. n/a
4. (Spain) Sergio Casal / (Spain) Emilio Sánchez (second round)
5. (Ecuador) Andrés Gómez / (Socialist Federal Republic of Yugoslavia) Slobodan Živojinović (third round)
6. (United States) Paul Annacone / (South Africa) Christo van Rensburg (semifinals)
7. (Australia) John Fitzgerald / (Sweden) Anders Järryd (champions)
8. (Australia) Laurie Warder / (United States) Blaine Willenborg (quarterfinals)
9. (Mexico) Jorge Lozano / (United States) Todd Witsken (third round)
10. (New Zealand) Kelly Evernden / (United States) Johan Kriek (third round)
11. (United States) Rick Leach / (United States) Jim Pugh (second round)
12. (Sweden) Joakim Nyström / (Sweden) Magnus Tideman (first round)
13. (United States) Martin Davis / (Australia) Brad Drewett (quarterfinals)
14. (United States) Mike De Palmer / (United States) Gary Donnelly (second round)
15. (Australia) Darren Cahill / (Australia) Mark Kratzmann (second round)
16. (Switzerland) Claudio Mezzadri / (Netherlands) Michiel Schapers (first round)

== Draw ==
=== Key ===
- Q = Qualifier
- WC = Wild card
- LL = Lucky loser
- Alt = Alternate
- SE = Special exempt
- PR = Protected ranking
- ITF = ITF entry
- JE = Junior exempt
- w/o = Walkover
- r = Retired
- d = Defaulted
- SR = Special ranking

=== Finals ===
Semifinals
1	(United States) Ken Flach (United States) Robert Seguso	6	6	7
(United States) Kelly Jones (Denmark) Michael Mortensen	1	2	6
6	(United States) Paul Annacone (South Africa) Christo van Rensburg	6	6	6	4	1
7	(Australia) John Fitzgerald (Sweden) Anders Järryd	4	2	7	6	6

Final
1	(United States) Ken Flach (United States) Robert Seguso	6	1	5
7	(Australia) John Fitzgerald (Sweden) Anders Järryd	7	6	7

=== Top half ===
==== Section 1 ====
Second round
1	(United States) K Flach (United States) R Seguso	6	6	6
(Canada) G Connell (Canada) G Michibata	7	3	3
(Sweden) N Kroon (Sweden) M Wilander	6	7
(Sweden) R Båthman (Sweden) J Gunnarsson	2	6
(United Kingdom) J Bates (Sweden) P Lundgren	6	6
Q	(Australia) A Emerson (Colombia) Á Jordan	4	2
(South Africa) B Levine (Australia) D Macpherson	1	5
15	(Australia) D Cahill (Australia) M Kratzmann	6	7

Third round
1	(United States) K Flach (United States) R Seguso	6	6
(Sweden) N Kroon (Sweden) M Wilander	4	1
(United Kingdom) J Bates (Sweden) P Lundgren	7	6
15	(Australia) D Cahill (Australia) M Kratzmann	6	3

Quarterfinals
1	(United States) K Flach (United States) R Seguso	1	6	6
(United Kingdom) J Bates (Sweden) P Lundgren	6	4	4
Quarterfinals
1	(Mexico) J Lozano (United States) T Witsken	4	2	6
8	(Australia) L Warder (United States) B Willenborg	6	6

==== Section 2 ====
Second round
4	(Spain) S Casal (Spain) E Sánchez	6	6
(United States) P Chamberlin (United States) L Scott	3	4
(Israel) G Bloom (Israel) A Mansdorf	6	6
(United States) A Agassi (United States) J Arias	1	3
(Italy) P Canè (Italy) S Colombo	6	7
Q	(United States) C Kennedy (United States) P Wright	4	6
(Italy) O Camporese (Italy) D Nargiso	6	4	3
14	(United States) M De Palmer (United States) G Donnelly	4	6	6

Third round
4	(Spain) S Casal (Spain) E Sánchez	4	4
(Israel) G Bloom (Israel) A Mansdorf	6	6
(Italy) P Canè (Italy) S Colombo	7	6
14	(United States) M De Palmer (United States) G Donnelly	6	1

Quarterfinals
(Israel) G Bloom (Israel) A Mansdorf	5	7	1
(Italy) P Canè (Italy) S Colombo	7	6	6
Quarterfinals
(United States) K Jones (Denmark) M Mortensen	3	7	7	3
(Ecuador) A Gómez (Socialist Federal Republic of Yugoslavia) S Živojinović	6	6	6	6

=== Bottom half ===
==== Section 3 ====
Second round
6	(United States) P Annacone (South Africa) C van Rensburg	6	6
(Australia) B Dyke (Australia) W Masur	3	4
(Australia) P Doohan (United States) T Wilkison	6	6
(Argentina) J Frana (Spain) J Sánchez	4	4
(United States) M Anger (United States) G Holmes	4	6	7
(Czechoslovakia) P Korda (Czechoslovakia) J Navrátil	6	3	6
(South Africa) P Aldrich (South Africa) W Green	6	3	6
12	(Sweden) J Nyström (Sweden) M Tideman	4	6	2

Third round
6	(United States) P Annacone (South Africa) C van Rensburg	6	6	7
(Australia) P Doohan (United States) T Wilkison	7	2	5
(United States) M Anger (United States) G Holmes	6	6
(South Africa) P Aldrich (South Africa) W Green	3	3

Quarterfinals
6	(United States) P Annacone (South Africa) C van Rensburg	6	6
(United States) M Anger (United States) G Holmes	3	3
Quarterfinals
6	(United States) M Davis (Australia) B Drewett	6	6	7	6	7
13	(United States) M Basham (United States) C Beckman	1	2	7	5

==== Section 4 ====
Second round
7	(Australia) J Fitzgerald (Sweden) A Järryd	6	6	7
(United States) R Baxter (Nigeria) N Odizor	3	7	6
(West Germany) T Meinecke (West Germany) R Osterthun	3	7	0
(United States) L Shiras (South Africa) D Visser	6	6	6
Q	(West Germany) J Becka (New Zealand) S Guy	7	6
(Mexico) L Lavalle (Italy) C Panatta	6	4
(Chile) R Acuña (United States) L Jensen	3	2
10	(New Zealand) K Evernden (United States) J Kriek	6	6

Third round
7	(Australia) J Fitzgerald (Sweden) A Järryd	6	6
(United States) L Shiras (South Africa) D Visser	4	4
Q	(West Germany) J Becka (New Zealand) S Guy	4	2
10	(New Zealand) K Evernden (United States) J Kriek	6	6

Quarterfinals
7	(Australia) J Fitzgerald (Sweden) A Järryd	7	6
10	(New Zealand) K Evernden (United States) J Kriek	5	3
Quarterfinals
7	(United States) M Flur (United States) S Giammalva, Jr.	3	6	6
(Czechoslovakia) M Mečíř (Czechoslovakia) T Šmíd	6	1	4
