= 1988 Lipton International Players Championships – Men's singles =

Men's singles
- 1988 Lipton International Players Championships

Final
- Champion: (Sweden) Mats Wilander
- Runner-up: (United States) Jimmy Connors
- Score: 6–4, 4–6, 6–4, 6–4

Details
- Draw: 128
- Seeds: 32

Events
Singles	men	women
Doubles	men	women
← 1987 ·	Miami Open	· 1989 →

Miloslav Mečíř was the defending champion but lost in the semifinals to Jimmy Connors.

Mats Wilander won in the final 6–4, 4–6, 6–4, 6–4 against Connors.

== Seeds ==
1. (Sweden) Mats Wilander (champion)
2. (United States) Jimmy Connors (final)
3. (Czechoslovakia) Miloslav Mečíř (semifinals)
4. (United States) Tim Mayotte (fourth round)
5. (Ecuador) Andrés Gómez (second round)
6. (France) Yannick Noah (semifinals)
7. (Sweden) Anders Järryd (quarterfinals)
8. (Argentina) Martín Jaite (third round)
9. (United States) Andre Agassi (third round, retired)
10. (Sweden) Joakim Nyström (second round)
11. (Spain) Emilio Sánchez (fourth round)
12. (South Africa) Christo van Rensburg (first round)
13. (United States) David Pate (first round)
14. (Sweden) Mikael Pernfors (fourth round)
15. (Argentina) Guillermo Pérez Roldán (first round)
16. (Socialist Federal Republic of Yugoslavia) Slobodan Živojinović (third round)
17. (Israel) Amos Mansdorf (fourth round)
18. (United States) Kevin Curren (second round, retired)
19. (Soviet Union) Andrei Chesnokov (quarterfinals)
20. (Argentina) Eduardo Bengoechea (first round)
21. (Australia) John Fitzgerald (third round)
22. (Netherlands) Michiel Schapers (second round)
23. (Switzerland) Claudio Mezzadri (second round)
24. (Sweden) Peter Lundgren (second round)
25. (Australia) John Frawley (third round)
26. (India) Ramesh Krishnan (fourth round)
27. (Czechoslovakia) Tomáš Šmíd (third round)
28. (United States) Jimmy Arias (first round)
29. (United States) Paul Annacone (third round)
30. (United States) Dan Goldie (third round)
31. (West Germany) Carl-Uwe Steeb (second round)
32. (Brazil) Luiz Mattar (second round)

== Main draw ==
=== Key ===
- Q = Qualifier
- WC = Wild card
- LL = Lucky loser
- Alt = Alternate
- SE = Special exempt
- PR = Protected ranking
- ITF = ITF entry
- JE = Junior exempt
- w/o = Walkover
- r = Retired
- d = Defaulted
- SR = Special ranking

=== Finals ===
Quarterfinals
1	(Sweden) Mats Wilander	6	6	6
(United States) Aaron Krickstein	1	2	0
19	(Soviet Union) Andrei Chesnokov	1	4	4
6	(France) Yannick Noah	6	6	6
(United States) Jay Berger	1	6	3	6
3	(Czechoslovakia) Miloslav Mečíř	6	2	6	7
7	(Sweden) Anders Järryd	5	3	1
2	(United States) Jimmy Connors	7	6	6

Semifinals
1	(Sweden) Mats Wilander	6	6	6
6	(France) Yannick Noah	4	4	3
3	(Czechoslovakia) Miloslav Mečíř	3	6	5	3
2	(United States) Jimmy Connors	6	3	7	6

Final
1	(Sweden) Mats Wilander	6	4	6	6
2	(United States) Jimmy Connors	4	6	4	4

=== Top half ===
==== Section 1 ====
First round
1	(Sweden) M Wilander	6	6	7
Q	(Mexico) L Lavalle	3	2	5
(United States) T Witsken	6	6	7
(United States) J Ross	3	2	6
(Soviet Union) A Volkov	6	6	6
(West Germany) A Maurer	2	4	4
Q	(United States) M Dickson	6	6	4	6
31	(West Germany) C-U Steeb	7	4	6	7
18	(United States) K Curren	7	6	6
(Austria) H Skoff	6	2	4
(United States) M Davis	4	1	3
(Austria) T Muster	6	6	6
(Czechoslovakia) K Nováček	3	0	6	2
(Canada) G Connell	6	6	4	6
(Australia) M Woodforde	4	6	2	7	6
15	(Argentina) G Pérez Roldán	6	3	6	5	2

Second round
1	(Sweden) M Wilander	6	6	6
(United States) T Witsken	3	4	4
(Soviet Union) A Volkov	7	6	6
31	(West Germany) C-U Steeb	5	2	1
18	(United States) K Curren	6	3	6	2	1^{r}
(Austria) T Muster	3	6	4	6	0
(Canada) G Connell	2	1	1
(Australia) M Woodforde	6	6	6

Third round
1	(Sweden) M Wilander	6	6	6	6
(Soviet Union) A Volkov	3	7	4	2
(Austria) T Muster	2	6	6	5
(Australia) M Woodforde	6	7	3	7

Fourth round
1	(Sweden) M Wilander	7	6	6
(Australia) M Woodforde	6	2	1

==== Section 2 ====
First round
9	(United States) A Agassi	6	6	6
(United Kingdom) J Bates	2	1	0
(Netherlands) T Nijssen	3	7	6	6
(Peru) P Arraya	6	5	3	2
(West Germany) R Osterthun	4	2	4
(United States) A Krickstein	6	6	6
(Australia) P Doohan	5	6	3	4
24	(Sweden) P Lundgren	7	4	6	6
26	(India) R Krishnan	7	6	6
Q	(Australia) M Kratzmann	6	4	3
Q	(United States) J Canter	6	3	6	6
(Austria) A Antonitsch	1	6	3	2
(West Germany) D Keretić	2	1	6	7	4
(Belgium) L Pimek	6	6	3	6	6
(South Africa) B Moir	6	2	0	3
8	(Argentina) M Jaite	4	6	6	6

Second round
9	(United States) A Agassi	6	6	6
(Netherlands) T Nijssen	4	3	3
(United States) A Krickstein	4	7	2	7	7
24	(Sweden) P Lundgren	6	5	6	5	5
26	(India) R Krishnan	6	6	6
Q	(United States) J Canter	3	4	4
(Belgium) L Pimek	4	0	3
8	(Argentina) M Jaite	6	6	6

Third round
9	(United States) A Agassi	6	6	3	5	0^{r}
(United States) A Krickstein	4	4	6	7	1
26	(India) R Krishnan	3	6	6	6
8	(Argentina) M Jaite	6	3	3	3

Fourth round
(United States) A Krickstein	6	2	6	3	7
26	(India) R Krishnan	2	6	3	6	5

==== Section 3 ====
First round
4	(United States) T Mayotte	7	6	7
(Spain) S Casal	6	3	5
(Sweden) N Kroon	6	7	6
(New Zealand) K Evernden	1	6	3
Q	(Canada) G Michibata	1	3	2
Q	(United States) J Courier	6	6	6
(United States) M Anger	1	2	2
29	(United States) P Annacone	6	6	6
19	(Soviet Union) A Chesnokov	6	6	6
(Sweden) C Bergström	3	4	2
(Australia) D Cahill	7	6	6	6
(United States) T Wilkison	5	4	7	3
(West Germany) T Meinecke	3	4	2
Q	(The Bahamas) R Smith	6	6	6
(United States) R Reneberg	6	7	6
13	(United States) D Pate	4	5	4

Second round
4	(United States) T Mayotte	5	6	6	6
(Sweden) N Kroon	7	2	3	3
Q	(United States) J Courier	6	4	4	6	4
29	(United States) P Annacone	4	6	6	4	6
19	(Soviet Union) A Chesnokov	6	6	3	6
(Australia) D Cahill	2	4	6	4
Q	(The Bahamas) R Smith	6	2	4	3
(United States) R Reneberg	4	6	6	6

Third round
4	(United States) T Mayotte	7	6	6
29	(United States) P Annacone	6	3	3
19	(Soviet Union) A Chesnokov	6	6	6
(United States) R Reneberg	3	2	3

Fourth round
4	(United States) T Mayotte	0	7	2	6	3
19	(Soviet Union) A Chesnokov	6	6	6	4	6

==== Section 4 ====
First round
12	(South Africa) C van Rensburg	2	3	3
(United States) S Davis	6	6	6
(United States) J Rive	6	2	6	6
(United States) S Giammalva, Jr.	3	6	4	1
(Israel) G Bloom	6	6	6
Q	(France) O Delaître	4	4	1
(Sweden) M Gustafsson	1	2	4
21	(Australia) J Fitzgerald	6	6	6
27	(Czechoslovakia) T Šmíd	6	6	6
(Sweden) J Gunnarsson	4	0	3
(West Germany) P Kühnen	4	1^{r}
(France) T Benhabiles	6	4
(Socialist Federal Republic of Yugoslavia) B Orešar	7	6	6
(United States) J Pugh	5	2	2
Q	(United States) P Chamberlin	6	1	6	6	2
6	(France) Y Noah	2	6	3	7	6

Second round
(United States) S Davis	3	7	4	4
(United States) J Rive	6	6	6	6
(Israel) G Bloom	6	4	6	6
21	(Australia) J Fitzgerald	7	6	4	7
27	(Czechoslovakia) T Šmíd	6	6	6
(France) T Benhabiles	2	4	3
(Socialist Federal Republic of Yugoslavia) B Orešar	1	5	2
6	(France) Y Noah	6	7	6

Third round
(United States) J Rive	6	6	7	7
21	(Australia) J Fitzgerald	2	7	5	5
27	(Czechoslovakia) T Šmíd	6	2	2
6	(France) Y Noah	7	6	6

Fourth round
(United States) J Rive	2	3	2
6	(France) Y Noah	6	6	6

=== Bottom half ===
==== Section 5 ====
First round
5	(Ecuador) A Gómez	6	2	6	6
(United States) D Cassidy	2	6	3	2
(United States) J Kriek	2	4	1
(United States) J Berger	6	6	6
(Italy) P Canè	7	6	6	3	6
Q	(Argentina) R Saad	6	7	4	6	3
(Peru) J Yzaga	6	6	7	6
28	(United States) J Arias	7	3	6	4
22	(Netherlands) M Schapers	6	6	7
(United States) J Brown	4	2	5
Q	(United States) J Gurfein	6	6	6	6
Q	(United States) R Leach	2	2	7	4
(Czechoslovakia) M Vajda	4	1	6	6	4
(United States) K Flach	6	6	3	4	6
(Nigeria) N Odizor	6	2	6	3
11	(Spain) E Sánchez	7	6	3	6

Second round
5	(Ecuador) A Gómez	4	4	7	3
(United States) J Berger	6	6	6	6
(Italy) P Canè	3	6	6	6	7
(Peru) J Yzaga	6	1	7	3	6
22	(Netherlands) M Schapers	6	3	4
Q	(United States) J Gurfein	7	6	6
(United States) K Flach	6	3	1
11	(Spain) E Sánchez	7	6	6

Third round
(United States) J Berger	6	6	6
(Italy) P Canè	3	0	2
Q	(United States) J Gurfein	6	3	6	2	4
11	(Spain) E Sánchez	3	6	3	6	6

Fourth round
(United States) J Berger	6	7	6
11	(Spain) E Sánchez	4	5	4

==== Section 6 ====
First round
14	(Sweden) M Pernfors	3	6	6	6
(Uruguay) D Pérez	6	2	3	0
(South Africa) D Visser	4	3	3
(United States) M Flur	6	6	6
(Argentina) H de la Peña	6	6	2	4	2
WC	(United States) R Seguso	3	4	6	6	6
(United States) J Grabb	6	6	6
20	(Argentina) E Bengoechea	1	3	1
30	(United States) D Goldie	7	4	1	7	7
(West Germany) C Saceanu	6	6	6	5	6
Q	(United States) M Basham	7	4	4	5
(Czechoslovakia) M Šrejber	5	6	6	7
(Argentina) J Frana	6	3	6
Q	(United States) G Layendecker	7	6	7
Q	(United States) G Bezecny	4	7	4	4
3	(Czechoslovakia) M Mečíř	6	5	6	6

Second round
14	(Sweden) M Pernfors	6	6	6
(United States) M Flur	4	3	4
WC	(United States) R Seguso	6	3	6	6
(United States) J Grabb	2	6	4	2
30	(United States) D Goldie	4	7	1	6	6
(Czechoslovakia) M Šrejber	6	6	6	2	4
Q	(United States) G Layendecker	2	2	2
3	(Czechoslovakia) M Mečíř	6	6	6

Third round
14	(Sweden) M Pernfors	6	6	6
WC	(United States) R Seguso	2	0	4
30	(United States) D Goldie	2	2	3
3	(Czechoslovakia) M Mečíř	6	6	6

Fourth round
14	(Sweden) M Pernfors	5	0	1
3	(Czechoslovakia) M Mečíř	7	6	6

==== Section 7 ====
First round
7	(Sweden) A Järryd	6	6	6
(France) T Champion	2	1	2
(South Africa) P Aldrich	6	6	6
(Uruguay) M Filippini	1	2	1
(Canada) C Pridham	6	2	6	6	7
(France) E Winogradsky	1	6	7	3	5
(Haiti) R Agénor	4	4	3
25	(Australia) J Frawley	6	6	6
23	(Switzerland) C Mezzadri	7	4	6	5	6
(United States) B Scanlon	6	6	3	7	4
(France) G Forget	6	6	6
(France) J Potier	3	2	4
(Argentina) G Vilas	2	4	2
(United States) M Purcell	6	6	6
(West Germany) E Jelen	1	1	6	2
10	(Sweden) J Nyström	6	6	4	6

Second round
7	(Sweden) A Järryd	7	4	6	6
(South Africa) P Aldrich	5	6	1	2
(Canada) C Pridham	6	5	6
25	(Australia) J Frawley	7	7	7
23	(Switzerland) C Mezzadri	6	6	3	3
(France) G Forget	7	4	6	6
(United States) M Purcell	6	4	3	6	7
10	(Sweden) J Nyström	1	6	6	0	5

Third round
7	(Sweden) A Järryd	6	6	6
25	(Australia) J Frawley	3	2	4
(France) G Forget	6	6	6
(United States) M Purcell	3	4	4

Fourth round
7	(Sweden) A Järryd	6	1	6	7
(France) G Forget	2	6	4	6

==== Section 8 ====
First round
16	(Socialist Federal Republic of Yugoslavia) S Živojinović	6	6	6
(United States) G Holmes	3	3	4
(France) T Tulasne	6	6	6	4	7
(Czechoslovakia) P Korda	3	7	4	6	6
(Italy) F Cancellotti	6	6	6
(Mexico) J Lozano	1	2	4
(South Africa) G Muller	3	3	1
17	(Israel) A Mansdorf	6	6	6
32	(Brazil) L Mattar	6	6	6
Q	(United States) K Jones	3	3	2
(Czechoslovakia) B Stanković	3	2	0
(Spain) J Sánchez	6	6	6
(Australia) W Masur	4	4	4
(Czechoslovakia) J Navrátil	6	6	6
(Australia) B Dyke	2	2	0
2	(United States) J Connors	6	6	6

Second round
16	(Socialist Federal Republic of Yugoslavia) S Živojinović	6	6	6
(France) T Tulasne	3	2	3
(Italy) F Cancellotti	1	4	3
17	(Israel) A Mansdorf	6	6	6
32	(Brazil) L Mattar	4	6	3
(Spain) J Sánchez	6	7	6
(Czechoslovakia) J Navrátil	0	4	4
2	(United States) J Connors	6	6	6

Third round
16	(Socialist Federal Republic of Yugoslavia) S Živojinović	4	7	3	1
17	(Israel) A Mansdorf	6	6	6	6
(Spain) J Sánchez	1	4	4
2	(United States) J Connors	6	6	6

Fourth round
17	(Israel) A Mansdorf	3	4	3
2	(United States) J Connors	6	6	6
