= 1987 Lipton International Players Championships =

- Date: February 23 – March 9
- Edition: 3rd
- Surface: Hard / outdoor
- Location: Key Biscayne, Florida, U.S.
- Venue: Tennis Center at Crandon Park

Champions

Men's singles
- (Czechoslovakia) Miloslav Mečíř

Women's singles
- (West Germany) Steffi Graf

Men's doubles
- (United States) Paul Annacone / (South Africa) Christo van Rensburg

Women's doubles
- (United States) Martina Navratilova / (Czechoslovakia) Helena Suková

Mixed doubles
- (Czechoslovakia) Miloslav Mečíř / (Czechoslovakia) Jana Novotná
← 1986 ·	Miami Open	· 1988 →

The 1987 Lipton International Players Championships was a combined men's and women's tennis tournament played on outdoor hard courts. It was the 3rd edition of the Miami Masters and was part of the 1987 Nabisco Grand Prix and the 1987 Virginia Slims World Championship Series. The tournament moved from the previous venue in Boca West, Florida and took place at the Tennis Center at Crandon Park in Key Biscayne, Florida in the United States from February 23 through March 9, 1987. Miloslav Mečíř and Steffi Graf won the singles titles.

== Finals ==
=== Men's singles ===
(Czechoslovakia) Miloslav Mečíř defeated (Czechoslovakia) Ivan Lendl 7–5, 6–2, 7–5

- It was Mečíř's 3rd title of the year and the 8th of his career.

=== Women's singles ===
(West Germany) Steffi Graf defeated (United States) Chris Evert-Lloyd 6–1, 6–2

- It was Graf's 2nd title of the year and the 10th of her career.

=== Men's doubles ===
(United States) Paul Annacone / (South Africa) Christo van Rensburg defeated (United States) Ken Flach / (United States) Robert Seguso 6–2, 6–4, 6–4

- It was Annacone's 1st title of the year and the 8th of his career. It was van Rensburg's 1st title of the year and the 9th of his career. It was also the pair's 2nd victory in the doubles event, having won it at the inaugural tournament in 1985.

=== Women's doubles ===
(United States) Martina Navratilova / (United States) Pam Shriver defeated (West Germany) Claudia Kohde-Kilsch / (Czechoslovakia) Helena Suková 6–3, 7–6^{(8–6)}

- It was Navratilova's 2nd title of the year and the 241st of her career. It was Shriver's 2nd title of the year and the 93rd of her career. It was Navrátilová's 3rd title at the event, having previously won the singles and doubles events – the latter with Gigi Fernández – at the inaugural tournament in 1985.
