= 1987 Lipton International Players Championships – Men's singles =

Men's singles
- 1987 Lipton International Players Championships

Final
- Champion: (Czechoslovakia) Miloslav Mečíř
- Runner-up: (Czechoslovakia) Ivan Lendl
- Score: 7–5, 6–2, 7–5

Details
- Draw: 128 (2WC/16Q/3LL)
- Seeds: 32

Events
Singles	men	women
Doubles	men	women	mixed
← 1986 ·	Miami Open	· 1988 →

Tennis championship held in 1987. Ivan Lendl was the defending champion but lost in the final 7–5, 6–2, 7–5 to Miloslav Mečíř.

== Seeds ==
1. (Czechoslovakia) Ivan Lendl (final)
2. (Sweden) Stefan Edberg (quarterfinals)
3. (West Germany) Boris Becker (first round, withdrew)
4. (France) Yannick Noah (semifinals, retired)
5. (Sweden) Mats Wilander (quarterfinals)
6. (United States) Jimmy Connors (semifinals)
7. n/a
8. (Sweden) Joakim Nyström (second round)
9. (Czechoslovakia) Miloslav Mečíř (champion)
10. (Ecuador) Andrés Gómez (fourth round)
11. (Sweden) Mikael Pernfors (second round)
12. (United States) Tim Mayotte (fourth round)
13. (Spain) Emilio Sánchez (first round)
14. (Argentina) Martín Jaite (first round)
15. (France) Thierry Tulasne (second round)
16. (United States) Brad Gilbert (fourth round)
17. (Sweden) Jonas Svensson (first round)
18. (United States) Kevin Curren (fourth round)
19. (United States) Johan Kriek (fourth round)
20. (United States) Robert Seguso (fourth round)
21. (France) Guy Forget (first round)
22. (United States) Aaron Krickstein (third round)
23. (Sweden) Anders Järryd (second round)
24. (United States) David Pate (second round)
25. (United States) Tim Wilkison (second round)
26. (Czechoslovakia) Milan Šrejber (second round)
27. (Czechoslovakia) Karel Nováček (first round)
28. (Switzerland) Jakob Hlasek (third round)
29. (Israel) Amos Mansdorf (third round)
30. (Sweden) Ulf Stenlund (third round)
31. (India) Ramesh Krishnan (second round)
32. (Soviet Union) Andrei Chesnokov (second round)

== Main draw ==
=== Key ===
- Q = Qualifier
- WC = Wild card
- LL = Lucky loser
- Alt = Alternate
- SE = Special exempt
- PR = Protected ranking
- ITF = ITF entry
- JE = Junior exempt
- w/o = Walkover
- r = Retired
- d = Defaulted
- SR = Special ranking

=== Finals ===
Quarterfinals
1	(Czechoslovakia) Ivan Lendl	6	6	6
(United States) Jay Berger	3	1	1
(United States) Derrick Rostagno	4	6	1	2
WC/6	(United States) Jimmy Connors	6	4	6	6
5	(Sweden) Mats Wilander	4	2	6	6	6
4	(France) Yannick Noah	6	6	4	2	7
9	(Czechoslovakia) Miloslav Mečíř	3	6	6	6
2	(Sweden) Stefan Edberg	6	2	2	4

Semifinals
1	(Czechoslovakia) Ivan Lendl	3	7	7	6
WC/6	(United States) Jimmy Connors	6	6	6	3
4	(France) Yannick Noah	5	1^{r}
9	(Czechoslovakia) Miloslav Mečíř	7	5

Final
1	(Czechoslovakia) Ivan Lendl	5	2	5
9	(Czechoslovakia) Miloslav Mečíř	7	6	7

=== Top half ===
==== Section 1 ====
First round
1	(Czechoslovakia) I Lendl	6	6	6
Q	(Chile) R Acuña	2	3	2
(United States) P Annacone	6	6	6
(South Africa) C van Rensburg	1	4	2
(United States) A Agassi	6	5	7	6	4
(Austria) T Muster	7	7	5	0	6
(Czechoslovakia) M Vajda	4	6	5	4
32	(Soviet Union) A Chesnokov	6	4	7	6
17	(Sweden) J Svensson	4	4	5
(Sweden) T Högstedt	6	6	7
Q	(Australia) A Emerson	1	2	2
Q	(United States) M Flur	6	6	6
(Sweden) J Windahl	6	1	4
(Haiti) R Agénor	7	6	6
Q	(United States) J Rive	3	2	4
16	(United States) B Gilbert	6	6	6

Second round
1	(Czechoslovakia) I Lendl	5	7	4	6	6
(United States) P Annacone	7	6	6	2	2
(Austria) T Muster	6	7	6
32	(Soviet Union) A Chesnokov	4	5	3
(Sweden) T Högstedt	0	4	1
Q	(United States) M Flur	6	6	6
(Haiti) R Agénor	2	1	4
16	(United States) B Gilbert	6	6	6

Third round
1	(Czechoslovakia) I Lendl	3	6	6	6
(Austria) T Muster	6	4	0	2
Q	(United States) M Flur	6	6	3
16	(United States) B Gilbert	7	7	6

Fourth round
1	(Czechoslovakia) I Lendl	6	6	6
16	(United States) B Gilbert	2	2	4

==== Section 2 ====
First round
10	(Ecuador) A Gómez	4	6	6	7
(Brazil) C Kirmayr	6	1	1	6
(Mexico) F Maciel	6	6	6
(Australia) B Dyke	2	0	2
Q	(South Africa) H Herr	1	5	2
(France) T Benhabiles	6	7	6
(Brazil) I Kley	3	0	3
23	(Sweden) A Järryd	6	6	6
25	(United States) T Wilkison	6	6	6	2	7
(Netherlands) M Schapers	4	7	3	6	5
(United States) G Layendecker	6	6	4	3	2
(United States) J Berger	3	4	6	6	6
(Italy) P Canè	4	4	6	6	7
(France) J-P Fleurian	6	6	3	4	6
(United States) B Green	2	3	2
8	(Sweden) J Nyström	6	6	6

Second round
10	(Ecuador) A Gómez	7	6	6
(Mexico) F Maciel	6	3	4
(France) T Benhabiles	6	6	6
23	(Sweden) A Järryd	3	2	4
25	(United States) T Wilkison	7	1	1	4
(United States) J Berger	6	6	6	6
(Italy) P Canè	6	6	6	6
8	(Sweden) J Nyström	1	3	7	3

Third round
10	(Ecuador) A Gómez	6	3	6	7
(France) T Benhabiles	4	6	3	6
(United States) J Berger	6	6	6
(Italy) P Canè	2	2	1

Fourth round
10	(Ecuador) A Gómez	3	6	4	4
(United States) J Berger	6	3	6	6

==== Section 3 ====
First round
3	(West Germany) B Becker
(United States) D Rostagno	w/o
(United States) R Matuszewski	6	6	6
(United States) J Canter	4	1	3
(United Kingdom) A Castle	7	6	6	3
Q	(South Africa) B Moir	6	7	7	6
(Canada) M Laurendeau	3	2	2
29	(Israel) A Mansdorf	6	6	6
20	(United States) R Seguso	6	5	7	0	6
Q	(United States) P Chamberlin	2	7	5	6	4
(Italy) S Colombo	3	6	3	6
(Czechoslovakia) T Šmíd	6	3	6	7
(United States) B Scanlon	4	5	3
(Spain) S Casal	6	7	6
(South Africa) D Visser	6	4	7	4	6
14	(Argentina) M Jaite	4	6	5	6	2

Second round
(United States) D Rostagno	6	6	5	6
(United States) R Matuszewski	4	3	7	0
Q	(South Africa) B Moir	2	3	1
29	(Israel) A Mansdorf	6	6	6
20	(United States) R Seguso	7	5	6	3	6
(Czechoslovakia) T Šmíd	6	7	3	6	2
(Spain) S Casal	6	3	6	2
(South Africa) D Visser	4	6	7	6

Third round
(United States) D Rostagno	7	6	6
29	(Israel) A Mansdorf	6	1	4
20	(United States) R Seguso	7	4	6	6	6
(South Africa) D Visser	6	6	7	4	4

Fourth round
(United States) D Rostagno	6	6	6	6
20	(United States) R Seguso	4	7	3	4

==== Section 4 ====
First round
11	(Sweden) M Pernfors	6	6	6	0	6
(United States) M Freeman	7	3	2	6	4
(Sweden) J Carlsson	4	7	6	6
(United States) T Nelson	6	6	2	3
(West Germany) R Osterthun	2	4	7	6	3
LL	(New Zealand) R Simpson	6	6	6	4	6
(Australia) C Limberger	6	7	6	6
21	(France) G Forget	4	6	7	2
27	(Czechoslovakia) K Nováček	6	1	6	3	3
Q	(Israel) G Bloom	4	6	4	6	6
(Italy) C Aprili	3	1	3
(Australia) D Cahill	6	6	6
Q	(United States) R Van't Hof	2	6	6	3	0
(Sweden) P Lundgren	6	3	4	6	6
(United States) B Testerman	1	1	3
WC/6	(United States) J Connors	6	6	6

Second round
11	(Sweden) M Pernfors	3	1	6	6	4
(Sweden) J Carlsson	6	6	4	1	6
LL	(New Zealand) R Simpson	6	4	1	6	3
(Australia) C Limberger	4	6	6	2	6
Q	(Israel) G Bloom	6	3	5	2
(Australia) D Cahill	4	6	7	6
(Sweden) P Lundgren	6	4	2	3
WC/6	(United States) J Connors	2	6	6	6

Third round
(Sweden) J Carlsson	4	2	6	6	6
(Australia) C Limberger	6	6	3	2	0
(Australia) D Cahill	3	3	1
WC/6	(United States) J Connors	6	6	6

Fourth round
(Sweden) J Carlsson	0	1	0
WC/6	(United States) J Connors	6	6	6

=== Bottom half ===
==== Section 5 ====
First round
5	(Sweden) M Wilander	6	6	6
(United States) J Levine	1	2	4
(United States) M Leach	4	4	6	7	3
(United States) G Holmes	6	6	4	6	6
(United States) S Giammalva, Jr.	3	4	3
(South Africa) E Edwards	6	6	6
(South Africa) C Steyn	4	3	2
28	(Switzerland) J Hlasek	6	6	6
22	(United States) A Krickstein	6	3	6	6
(United States) M Anger	3	6	3	2
(Switzerland) R Stadler	4	6	2	6	7
(United States) T Gullikson	6	1	6	3	5
(West Germany) M Westphal	5	1	6	6	2
(United States) D Goldie	7	6	4	2	6
Q	(United States) R Schmidt	1	1	5
12	(United States) T Mayotte	6	6	7

Second round
5	(Sweden) M Wilander	6	6	3	6
(United States) G Holmes	4	4	6	3
(South Africa) E Edwards	1	4	2
28	(Switzerland) J Hlasek	6	6	6
22	(United States) A Krickstein	6	6	6
(Switzerland) R Stadler	3	2	0
(United States) D Goldie	5	5	3
12	(United States) T Mayotte	7	7	6

Third round
5	(Sweden) M Wilander	6	6	6
28	(Switzerland) J Hlasek	3	2	4
22	(United States) A Krickstein	6	3	4	3
12	(United States) T Mayotte	3	6	6	6

Fourth round
5	(Sweden) M Wilander	3	6	7	6	6
12	(United States) T Mayotte	6	3	5	7	4

==== Section 6 ====
First round
13	(Spain) E Sánchez	2	7	6	4	4
(Australia) W Masur	6	6	3	6	6
Q	(United States) K Flach	6	6	6
Q	(Finland) O Rahnasto	1	2	4
(United States) T Witsken	6	6	2	3	4
(United States) J Grabb	4	4	6	6	6
(United States) M Purcell	6	6	6	2	3
19	(United States) J Kriek	7	4	2	6	6
30	(Sweden) U Stenlund	7	4	6	6
Q	(Soviet Union) A Volkov	6	6	1	3
(Brazil) L Mattar	6	2	6	7	6
(Argentina) E Bengoechea	4	6	7	6	3
Q	(United States) B Dickinson	3	6	6	3
Q	(Spain) J Sánchez	6	7	4	6
LL	(Italy) C Panatta	3	7	2	3
4	(France) Y Noah	6	6	6	6

Second round
(Australia) W Masur	6	1	6	6
Q	(United States) K Flach	1	6	3	2
(United States) J Grabb	5	4	4
19	(United States) J Kriek	7	6	6
30	(Sweden) U Stenlund	1	6	6	6
(Brazil) L Mattar	6	3	2	3
Q	(Spain) J Sánchez	7	6	3	4	5
4	(France) Y Noah	6	4	6	6	7

Third round
(Australia) W Masur	4	2	6	4
19	(United States) J Kriek	6	6	4	6
30	(Sweden) U Stenlund	6	0	4	6	3
4	(France) Y Noah	1	6	6	2	6

Fourth round
19	(United States) J Kriek	6	2	3	6
4	(France) Y Noah	4	6	6	7

==== Section 7 ====
First round
LL	(United States) J Brown	2	6	0	6	7
(West Germany) D Keretić	6	3	6	4	6
(Socialist Federal Republic of Yugoslavia) S Živojinović	6	3	6	6
(United States) G Donnelly	4	6	2	3
(Uruguay) D Pérez	6	4	7	6	6
(United States) M Davis	7	6	6	1	3
(Nigeria) N Odizor	4	1	2
26	(Czechoslovakia) M Šrejber	6	6	6
24	(United States) D Pate	6	6	7
(West Germany) T Meinecke	1	2	6
(United States) J Arias	6	3	7	7
(Sweden) J Gunnarsson	2	6	5	5
(United States) B Schultz	6	6	6	3	5
(Peru) J Yzaga	4	7	4	6	7
(Brazil) C Motta	1	3	0
9	(Czechoslovakia) M Mečíř	6	6	6

Second round
LL	(United States) J Brown	6	2	1	6	2
(Socialist Federal Republic of Yugoslavia) S Živojinović	3	6	6	3	6
(Uruguay) D Pérez	6	3	6	6
26	(Czechoslovakia) M Šrejber	3	6	4	3
24	(United States) D Pate	7	6	3	6	1
(United States) J Arias	6	4	6	7	6
(Peru) J Yzaga	4	3	2
9	(Czechoslovakia) M Mečíř	6	6	6

Third round
(Socialist Federal Republic of Yugoslavia) S Živojinović	6	6	1	6
(Uruguay) D Pérez	2	4	6	3
(United States) J Arias	3	4	4
9	(Czechoslovakia) M Mečíř	6	6	6

Fourth round
(Socialist Federal Republic of Yugoslavia) S Živojinović	6	1	1	4
9	(Czechoslovakia) M Mečíř	2	6	6	6

==== Section 8 ====
First round
15	(France) T Tulasne	6	6	6
(Belgium) L Pimek	1	1	2
WC	(United States) A Parker	4	2	2
(Sweden) C Bergström	6	6	6
(United States) J Pugh	4	4	6
(United States) J Sadri	6	6	7
(United States) B Pearce	4	1	6	5
18	(United States) K Curren	6	6	4	7
31	(India) R Krishnan	6	7	6
Q	(United States) H Pfister	3	5	4
(United States) M De Palmer	6	2	7	6
(Peru) P Arraya	3	6	6	2
(United States) J Lapidus	6	4	6	0
(United States) S Davis	3	6	7	6
(Sweden) P Carlsson	3	3	2
2	(Sweden) S Edberg	6	6	6

Second round
15	(France) T Tulasne	3	6	3	7	3
(Sweden) C Bergström	6	3	6	6	6
(United States) J Sadri	6	3	3	5
18	(United States) K Curren	2	6	6	7
31	(India) R Krishnan	4	4	6	4
(United States) M De Palmer	6	6	2	6
(United States) S Davis	3	5	4
2	(Sweden) S Edberg	6	7	6

Third round
(Sweden) C Bergström	4	3	1
18	(United States) K Curren	6	6	6
(United States) M De Palmer	3	7	3	4
2	(Sweden) S Edberg	6	6	6	6

Fourth round
18	(United States) K Curren	5	3	4
2	(Sweden) S Edberg	7	6	6
