= 1988 Lipton International Players Championships – Women's singles =

Women's singles
- 1988 Lipton International Players Championships
- 1987 Champion: (West Germany) Steffi Graf

Final
- Champion: (West Germany) Steffi Graf
- Runner-up: (United States) Chris Evert
- Score: 6–4, 6–4

Details
- Draw: 128
- Seeds: 16

Events
Singles	men	women
Doubles	men	women
← 1987 ·	Miami Open	· 1989 →

Steffi Graf was the defending champion and won in the final 6–4, 6–4 against Chris Evert.

== Seeds ==
A champion seed is indicated in bold text while text in italics indicates the round in which that seed was eliminated.

1. (West Germany) **Steffi Graf (champion)**
2. (United States) Chris Evert (final)
3. (Argentina) Gabriela Sabatini (fourth round)
4. (Australia) Hana Mandlíková (third round)
5. (Czechoslovakia) Helena Suková (quarterfinals)
6. (West Germany) Claudia Kohde-Kilsch (quarterfinals)
7. (United States) Lori McNeil (first round)
8. (United States) Zina Garrison (third round)
9. (United States) Barbara Potter (quarterfinals)
10. (Bulgaria) Katerina Maleeva (first round)
11. (Italy) Sandra Cecchini (first round)
12. (Italy) Raffaella Reggi (fourth round)
13. (France) Nathalie Tauziat (fourth round)
14. (Sweden) Catarina Lindqvist (first round)
15. (United States) Mary Joe Fernández (semifinals)
16. (United States) Patty Fendick (first round)

== Draw ==
=== Key ===
- Q = Qualifier
- WC = Wild card
- LL = Lucky loser
- Alt = Alternate
- SE = Special exempt
- PR = Protected ranking
- ITF = ITF entry
- JE = Junior exempt
- w/o = Walkover
- r = Retired
- d = Defaulted
- SR = Special ranking

=== Finals ===
Quarterfinals
1	(West Germany) **Steffi Graf**	**6**	**6**
6	(West Germany) Claudia Kohde-Kilsch	3	0
9	(United States) Barbara Potter	**7**	3	4
(United States) **Stephanie Rehe**	5	**6**	**6**
(South Africa) Elna Reinach	2	3
15	(United States) **Mary Joe Fernández**	**6**	**6**
5	(Czechoslovakia) Helena Suková	**7**	5	4
2	(United States) **Chris Evert**	6	**7**	**6**

Semifinals
1	(West Germany) **Steffi Graf**	**6**	**6**
(United States) Stephanie Rehe	3	1
15	(United States) Mary Joe Fernández	2	1
2	(United States) **Chris Evert**	**6**	**6**

Final
1	(West Germany) **Steffi Graf**	**6**	**6**
2	(United States) Chris Evert	4	4

=== Top half ===
==== Section 1 ====
First round
1	(West Germany) **S Graf**	**6**	**6**
(Czechoslovakia) J Novotná	2	2
(United Kingdom) **S Gomer**	**7**	**6**
(Netherlands) H Witvoet	6	2
(South Africa) **R Fairbank**	4	**6**	**6**
(Australia) D Balestrat	**6**	3	0
Q	(Italy) **L Lapi**	**6**	**6**
(Belgium) S Wasserman	3	3
(United Kingdom) **J Durie**	**7**	4	**7**
(United States) M Torres	6	**6**	6
(France) **M-C Calleja**	**7**	5	**6**
(United States) A Henricksson	6	**7**	3
(United States) S Sloane	3	4
(United States) **E Hakami**	**6**	**6**
(United States) **G Magers**	3	**7**	**6**
16	(United States) P Fendick	**6**	6	3

Second round
1	(West Germany) **S Graf**	**6**	**6**
(United Kingdom) S Gomer	1	3
(South Africa) **R Fairbank**	**6**	**6**
Q	(Italy) L Lapi	1	4
(United Kingdom) **J Durie**	**7**	**6**
(France) M-C Calleja	6	2
(United States) **E Hakami**	**6**	**6**
(United States) G Magers	3	2

Third round
1	(West Germany) **S Graf**	**7**	**6**
(South Africa) R Fairbank	6	0
(United Kingdom) **J Durie**	**7**	**6**
(United States) E Hakami	6	3

Fourth round
1	(West Germany) **S Graf**	**6**	**6**
(United Kingdom) J Durie	1	1

==== Section 2 ====
First round
13	(France) **N Tauziat**	4	**6**	**6**
(Japan) E Inoue	**6**	3	2
Q	(United States) W Wood	6	4
(South Africa) **D Van Rensburg**	**7**	**6**
(United States) C MacGregor	2	**6**	2
(Czechoslovakia) **R Zrubáková**	**6**	3	**6**
Q	(United States) **D Faber**	**6**	**6**
(United States) M-L Daniels	2	0
(United States) R White	6	**6**	3
(France) **I Demongeot**	**7**	2	**6**
(West Germany) S Meier	5	4
(Argentina) **A Villagrán**	**7**	**6**
(Belgium) **A Devries**	**6**	4	**6**
(Argentina) B Fulco	3	**6**	2
(United States) M Werdel	4	1
6	(West Germany) **C Kohde-Kilsch**	**6**	**6**

Second round
13	(France) **N Tauziat**	**7**	**6**
(South Africa) D Van Rensburg	6	3
(Czechoslovakia) **R Zrubáková**	**6**	**6**
Q	(United States) D Faber	3	0
(France) **I Demongeot**	**6**	**6**
(Argentina) A Villagrán	3	2
(Belgium) A Devries	0	3
6	(West Germany) **C Kohde-Kilsch**	**6**	**6**

Third round
13	(France) **N Tauziat**	**6**	3	**6**
(Czechoslovakia) R Zrubáková	2	**6**	4
(France) I Demongeot	3	**7**	3
6	(West Germany) **C Kohde-Kilsch**	**6**	5	**6**

Fourth round
13	(France) N Tauziat	1	4
6	(West Germany) **C Kohde-Kilsch**	**6**	**6**

==== Section 3 ====
First round
4	(Australia) **H Mandlíková**	**6**	**6**
(United States) V Nelson-Dunbar	1	0
(West Germany) **W Probst**	**6**	2	**6**
(West Germany) I Cueto	3	**6**	4
Q	(West Germany) **S Auer**	**6**	**6**
(Poland) I Kuczyńska	3	1
(United States) S Mascarin	**7**	4	6
(United States) **A Frazier**	6	**6**	**7**
(Netherlands) M Bollegraf	2	**6**	6
(Switzerland) **E Krapl**	**6**	4	**7**
(Australia) W Turnbull	**6**	2	4
(France) **C Suire**	3	**6**	**6**
(United States) P Barg	6	0
(Czechoslovakia) **A Holíková**	**7**	**6**
(United States) R Reis	3	2
9	(United States) **B Potter**	**6**	**6**

Second round
4	(Australia) **H Mandlíková**	**6**	**7**
(West Germany) W Probst	1	5
Q	(West Germany) **S Auer**	**6**	**6**
(United States) A Frazier	4	2
(Switzerland) E Krapl	**6**	1	3
(France) **C Suire**	3	**6**	**6**
(Czechoslovakia) A Holíková	4	6
9	(United States) **B Potter**	**6**	**7**

Third round
4	(Australia) H Mandlíková	**6**	6	5
Q	(West Germany) **S Auer**	4	**7**	**7**
(France) C Suire	3	3
9	(United States) **B Potter**	**6**	**6**

Fourth round
Q	(West Germany) S Auer	3	0
9	(United States) **B Potter**	**6**	**6**

==== Section 4 ====
First round
11	(Italy) S Cecchini	2	4
(Argentina) **P Tarabini**	**6**	**6**
(Czechoslovakia) I Budařová	**6**	0	2
(Switzerland) **C Jolissaint**	2	**6**	**6**
Q	(Japan) **Y Koizumi**	**6**	6	**6**
(United States) H Ludloff	4	**7**	4
(South Africa) **K Schimper**	**6**	4	**6**
(France) A Dechaume	1	**6**	3
(United States) **C Christian**	**6**	**6**
Q	(West Germany) K Düll	1	2
(France) N Herreman	3	0
(United States) **S Rehe**	**6**	**6**
(West Germany) E Pfaff	4	2
(United States) **P Casale**	**6**	**6**
(Italy) **F Bonsignori**	**6**	**6**
7	(United States) L McNeil	2	4

Second round
(Argentina) **P Tarabini**	**6**	**6**
(Switzerland) C Jolissaint	2	0
Q	(Japan) Y Koizumi	6	3
(South Africa) **K Schimper**	**7**	**6**
(United States) C Christian	6	4
(United States) **S Rehe**	**7**	**6**
(United States) **P Casale**	**6**	**7**
(Italy) F Bonsignori	2	5

Third round
(Argentina) **P Tarabini**	**6**	**6**
(South Africa) K Schimper	4	2
(United States) **S Rehe**	**6**	**6**
(United States) P Casale	1	3

Fourth round
(Argentina) P Tarabini	4	2
(United States) **S Rehe**	**6**	**6**

=== Bottom half ===
==== Section 5 ====
First round
8	(United States) **Z Garrison**	**6**	**6**
(Austria) P Huber	1	1
(Canada) **J Hetherington**	**7**	**6**
(United States) B Nagelsen	5	3
(Hong Kong) P Hy	0	0
(United States) **C Benjamin**	**6**	**6**
(South Africa) **E Reinach**	**6**	**6**
(France) C Tanvier	2	2
(Brazil) N Dias	0	3
Q	(Italy) **L Ferrando**	**6**	**6**
(Argentina) M Paz	2	2
(Japan) **A Kijimuta**	**6**	**6**
(United States) **K Adams**	**7**	**6**
(United States) L Antonoplis	6	3
(Socialist Federal Republic of Yugoslavia) **S Goleš**	2	**6**	**7**
14	(Sweden) C Lindqvist	**6**	3	6

Second round
8	(United States) **Z Garrison**	6	**6**	**6**
(Canada) J Hetherington	**7**	4	4
(United States) C Benjamin	**6**	5	2
(South Africa) **E Reinach**	3	**7**	**6**
Q	(Italy) **L Ferrando**	**6**	**7**
(Japan) A Kijimuta	2	5
(United States) K Adams	4	2
(Socialist Federal Republic of Yugoslavia) **S Goleš**	**6**	**6**

Third round
8	(United States) Z Garrison	**6**	2	4
(South Africa) **E Reinach**	1	**6**	**6**
Q	(Italy) **L Ferrando**	**6**	**6**
(Socialist Federal Republic of Yugoslavia) S Goleš	2	0

Fourth round
(South Africa) **E Reinach**	**6**	**6**
Q	(Italy) L Ferrando	0	2

==== Section 6 ====
First round
15	(United States) **M J Fernández**	**6**	**6**
(France) E Derly	1	0
(United States) N Sodupe	1	3
(United States) **H Cioffi**	**6**	**6**
(United States) B Bowes	2	3
(South Africa) **M de Swardt**	**6**	**6**
(Italy) **L Golarsa**	**6**	**6**
(United States) B Gerken	2	3
(United States) **L Bonder**	0	**6**	**6**
(Denmark) T Scheuer-Larsen	**6**	2	4
(Switzerland) C Cohen	3	6
(United States) **L Allen**	**6**	**7**
(Socialist Federal Republic of Yugoslavia) **M Seleš**	**6**	**6**
(Australia) L Field	0	3
(Canada) H Kelesi	3	1
3	(Argentina) **G Sabatini**	**6**	**6**

Second round
15	(United States) **M J Fernández**	**6**	**6**
(United States) H Cioffi	2	2
(South Africa) M de Swardt	**6**	3	2
(Italy) **L Golarsa**	3	**6**	**6**
(United States) **L Bonder**	**6**	**6**
(United States) L Allen	3	0
(Socialist Federal Republic of Yugoslavia) M Seleš	6	3
3	(Argentina) **G Sabatini**	**7**	**6**

Third round
15	(United States) **M J Fernández**	4	**6**	**6**
(Italy) L Golarsa	**6**	2	0
(United States) L Bonder	2	0
3	(Argentina) **G Sabatini**	**6**	**6**

Fourth round
15	(United States) **M J Fernández**	**6**	6	**6**
3	(Argentina) G Sabatini	4	**7**	3

==== Section 7 ====
First round
5	(Czechoslovakia) **H Suková**	**7**	**6**
(New Zealand) B Cordwell	6	1
(United States) **G Fernández**	**6**	**7**
(United States) T Mochizuki	2	5
(West Germany) C Singer	1	3
(Sweden) **M Lindström**	**6**	**6**
(United States) A Grossman	5	3
Q	(United States) **A Ivan**	**7**	**6**
(Brazil) G Miró	1	6
(United States) **P Harper**	**6**	**7**
(West Germany) **C Porwik**	**6**	**6**
(China) X Li	4	0
(United States) G Kim	3	3
(United States) **K Horvath**	**6**	**6**
(United States) S Walsh-Pete	1	3
12	(Italy) **R Reggi**	**6**	**6**

Second round
5	(Czechoslovakia) **H Suková**	3	**6**	**6**
(United States) G Fernández	**6**	4	2
(Sweden) M Lindström	**7**	3	3
Q	(United States) **A Ivan**	5	**6**	**6**
(United States) P Harper	3	**7**	5
(West Germany) **C Porwik**	**6**	5	**7**
(United States) K Horvath	4	5
12	(Italy) **R Reggi**	**6**	**7**

Third round
5	(Czechoslovakia) **H Suková**	**6**	**6**
Q	(United States) A Ivan	4	0
(West Germany) C Porwik	3	2
12	(Italy) **R Reggi**	**6**	**6**

Fourth round
5	(Czechoslovakia) **H Suková**	**6**	**6**
12	(Italy) R Reggi	3	0

==== Section 8 ====
First round
10	(Bulgaria) K Maleeva	6	**6**	1
(Australia) **A Minter**	**7**	3	**6**
(France) **P Paradis**	**6**	**6**
(Brazil) P Medrado	2	0
(Netherlands) B Schultz	**7**	3	5
(Australia) **N Provis**	5	**6**	**7**
(United States) A Berger	**6**	3	2
(Italy) **L Garrone**	3	**6**	**6**
(United States) L Spadea	**7**	2	1
(United States) **T Phelps**	6	**6**	**6**
(Spain) **A Sánchez**	**6**	**6**
(United States) K Keil	2	4
(United States) **M Gurney**	**6**	**6**
(Argentina) G Mosca	0	1
(United States) A Moulton	0	0
2	(United States) **C Evert**	**6**	**6**

Second round
(Australia) A Minter	3	0
(France) **P Paradis**	**6**	**6**
(Australia) **N Provis**	**6**	**6**
(Italy) L Garrone	3	2
(United States) **T Phelps**	4	**6**	**6**
(Spain) A Sánchez	**6**	2	2
(United States) M Gurney	0	2
2	(United States) **C Evert**	**6**	**6**

Third round
(France) **P Paradis**	**6**	**6**
(Australia) N Provis	4	3
(United States) T Phelps	1	4
2	(United States) **C Evert**	**6**	**6**

Fourth round
(France) P Paradis	4	2
2	(United States) **C Evert**	**6**	**6**
