= 1988 Lipton International Players Championships =

- Date: March 14–28
- Edition: 4th
- Surface: Hard / outdoor
- Location: Key Biscayne, Florida, U.S.
- Venue: Tennis Center at Crandon Park

Champions

Men's singles
- (Sweden) Mats Wilander

Women's singles
- (West Germany) Steffi Graf

Men's doubles
- (Australia) John Fitzgerald / (Sweden) Anders Järryd

Women's doubles
- (West Germany) Steffi Graf / (Argentina) Gabriela Sabatini
- Miami Open

The 1988 Lipton International Players Championships was a tennis tournament played on outdoor hard courts. It was the 4th edition of the Miami Masters and was part of the 1988 Nabisco Grand Prix and of the Category 6 tier of the 1988 WTA Tour. Both the men's and women's events took place at the Tennis Center at Crandon Park in Key Biscayne, Florida in the United States from March 14 through March 28, 1988. Mats Wilander and Steffi Graf won the singles title.

== Finals ==
=== Men's singles ===
(Sweden) Mats Wilander defeated (United States) Jimmy Connors 6–4, 4–6, 6–4, 6–4

- It was Wilander's 2nd title of the year and the 34th of his career.

=== Women's singles ===
(West Germany) Steffi Graf defeated (United States) Chris Evert 6–4, 6–4

- It was Graf's 3rd title of the year and the 22nd of her career.

=== Men's doubles ===
(Australia) John Fitzgerald / (Sweden) Anders Järryd defeated (United States) Ken Flach / (United States) Robert Seguso 7–6, 6–1, 7–5

- It was Fitzgerald's 2nd title of the year and the 19th of his career. It was Järryd's only title of the year and the 42nd of his career.

=== Women's doubles ===
(West Germany) Steffi Graf / (Argentina) Gabriela Sabatini defeated (United States) Gigi Fernández / (United States) Zina Garrison 7–6^{(8–6)}, 6–3

- It was Graf's 3rd title of the year and the 29th of her career. It was Sabatini's 2nd title of the year and the 14th of her career. It was Graf's 3rd title at the event having won the singles event in 1987 and the singles event this year.
