= 1987 Lipton International Players Championships – Women's singles =

Women's singles
- 1987 Lipton International Players Championships

Final
- Champion: (West Germany) Steffi Graf
- Runner-up: (United States) Chris Evert
- Score: 6–1, 6–2

Details
- Draw: 128 (8Q)
- Seeds: 16

Events
Singles	men	women
Doubles	men	women	mixed
← 1986 ·	Miami Open	· 1988 →

Chris Evert was the defending champion, but lost in the final to Steffi Graf. The score was 6–1, 6–2.

== Seeds ==
1. (United States) Martina Navratilova (semifinals)
2. (United States) Chris Evert (final)
3. (West Germany) Steffi Graf (champion)
4. (Czechoslovakia) Hana Mandlíková (semifinals)
5. (United States) Pam Shriver (second round)
6. (Czechoslovakia) Helena Suková (quarterfinals)
7. (United States) Zina Garrison (fourth round)
8. (United States) Kathy Rinaldi (third round)
9. (West Germany) Claudia Kohde-Kilsch (quarterfinals)
10. (Argentina) Gabriela Sabatini (fourth round)
11. (Bulgaria) Manuela Maleeva (first round)
12. (West Germany) Bettina Bunge (fourth round)
13. (United States) Lori McNeil (fourth round)
14. (Sweden) Catarina Lindqvist (third round)
15. (Australia) Wendy Turnbull (first round)
16. (United States) Robin White (third round)

== Draw ==
=== Key ===
- Q = Qualifier
- WC = Wild card
- LL = Lucky loser
- Alt = Alternate
- SE = Special exempt
- PR = Protected ranking
- ITF = ITF entry
- JE = Junior exempt
- w/o = Walkover
- r = Retired
- d = Defaulted
- SR = Special ranking

=== Finals ===
Quarterfinals
1	(United States) Martina Navratilova	6	6
(France) Nathalie Tauziat	1	1
3	(West Germany) Steffi Graf	6	6
(United States) Lisa Bonder	0	1
6	(Czechoslovakia) Helena Suková	4	3
4	(Czechoslovakia) Hana Mandlíková	6	6
9	(West Germany) Claudia Kohde-Kilsch	2	5
2	(United States) Chris Evert	6	7

Semifinals
1	(United States) Martina Navratilova	3	2
3	(West Germany) Steffi Graf	6	6
4	(Czechoslovakia) Hana Mandlíková	5	0
2	(United States) Chris Evert	7	6

Final
3	(West Germany) Steffi Graf	6	6
2	(United States) Chris Evert	1	2

=== Top half ===
==== Section 1 ====
First round
1	(United States) M Navratilova	7	6
(Spain) A Sánchez Vicario	5	4
(Australia) A Minter	7	4	6
(Socialist Federal Republic of Yugoslavia) S Goleš	5	6	0
(Romania) V Ruzici	5	3
Q	(United States) H Cioffi	7	6
(United States) M Torres	6	6
(Denmark) T Scheuer-Larsen	4	2
(Brazil) P Medrado	4	3
(United States) M Van Nostrand	6	6
(Peru) L Gildemeister	7	6
(Brazil) C Monteiro	5	3
(United States) B Gerken	4	0
Q	(Sweden) M Lindström	6	6
(United Kingdom) J Durie	4	1
10	(Argentina) G Sabatini	6	6

Second round
1	(United States) M Navratilova	6	6
(Australia) A Minter	3	1
Q	(United States) H Cioffi	6	7
(United States) M Torres	4	5
(United States) M Van Nostrand	0	3
(Peru) L Gildemeister	6	6
Q	(Sweden) M Lindström	3	1
10	(Argentina) G Sabatini	6	6

Third round
1	(United States) M Navratilova	6	6
Q	(United States) H Cioffi	1	0
(Peru) L Gildemeister	1	2
10	(Argentina) G Sabatini	6	6

Fourth round
1	(United States) M Navratilova	6	6
10	(Argentina) G Sabatini	1	3

==== Section 2 ====
First round
11	(Bulgaria) M Maleeva	6	6	4
(West Germany) S Meier	3	7	6
(United States) C Reynolds	2	4
(Brazil) N Dias	6	6
(United States) D Spence	3	2
(United States) M Werdel	6	6
(Italy) S Cecchini	2	4
(United States) T Phelps	6	6
(Switzerland) L Drescher	3	6	6
(Hungary) A Temesvári	6	4	2
(France) N Herreman	2	2
(France) N Tauziat	6	6
(United States) A Henricksson	6	4	6
(United States) K Gompert	2	6	4
(South Africa) E Reinach	6	3
8	(United States) K Rinaldi	7	6

Second round
(West Germany) S Meier	6	2	6
(Brazil) N Dias	1	6	2
(United States) M Werdel	6	7
(United States) T Phelps	3	5
(Switzerland) L Drescher	4	4
(France) N Tauziat	6	6
(United States) A Henricksson	3	3
8	(United States) K Rinaldi	6	6

Third round
(West Germany) S Meier	1	6	6
(United States) M Werdel	6	2	3
(France) N Tauziat	5	6	6
8	(United States) K Rinaldi	7	4	3

Fourth round
(West Germany) S Meier	0	3
(France) N Tauziat	6	6

==== Section 3 ====
First round
3	(West Germany) S Graf	6	6
(Netherlands) M Bollegraf	1	2
(Argentina) P Tarabini	1	5
(United States) E Burgin	6	7
(Italy) L Garrone	6	2
(Soviet Union) N Zvereva	7	6
(United States) A White	6	1
(United Kingdom) S Gomer	7	6
(Canada) C Bassett	6	3	3
(United States) K Keil	4	6	6
(United States) P Louie Harper	0	2
(United States) P Casale	6	6
Q	(South Africa) K Schimper	2	4
(United States) ML Piatek	6	6
Q	(Soviet Union) L Meskhi	3	4
16	(United States) R White	6	6

Second round
3	(West Germany) S Graf	6	6
(United States) E Burgin	3	4
(Soviet Union) N Zvereva	2	2
(United Kingdom) S Gomer	6	6
(United States) K Keil	6	1
(United States) P Casale	3	3^{r}
(United States) ML Piatek	5	5
16	(United States) R White	7	7

Third round
3	(West Germany) S Graf	6	6
(United Kingdom) S Gomer	1	0
(United States) K Keil	0	7	6
16	(United States) R White	6	6	3

Fourth round
3	(West Germany) S Graf	6	6
(United States) K Keil	0	1

==== Section 4 ====
First round
14	(Sweden) C Lindqvist	6	6
(United States) W White	4	4
(Netherlands) N Jagerman	7	5	5
(Hong Kong) P Hy	6	7	7
(Japan) M Yanagi	2	1
(United States) L Bonder	6	6
(United States) A Moulton	6	6
(Czechoslovakia) A Holíková	3	4
(United States) S Sloane	6	2	6
(United States) B Herr	1	6	1
(France) C Tanvier	6	5	6
(Austria) P Huber	4	7	3
(France) I Demongeot	4	3
(United States) MJ Fernández	6	6
Q	(France) A Dechaume	0	5
5	(United States) P Shriver	6	7

Second round
14	(Sweden) C Lindqvist	4	7	6
(Hong Kong) P Hy	6	6	3
(United States) L Bonder	6	6
(United States) A Moulton	2	3
(United States) S Sloane	6	2	6
(France) C Tanvier	1	6	1
(United States) MJ Fernández	6	6
5	(United States) P Shriver	3	4

Third round
14	(Sweden) C Lindqvist	4	1
(United States) L Bonder	6	6
(United States) S Sloane	1	1
(United States) MJ Fernández	6	6

Fourth round
(United States) L Bonder	6	6
(United States) MJ Fernández	4	1

=== Bottom half ===
==== Section 5 ====
First round
6	(Czechoslovakia) H Suková	6	6
(Australia) J Byrne	4	3
(United States) G Magers	6	6
(France) C Suire	4	3
(United States) G Fernández	2	5
(Argentina) M Paz	6	7
(United States) T Mochizuki	6	3	6
(South Africa) R Fairbank	1	6	7
(Austria) J Pölzl	6	3	2
(Australia) N Provis	3	6	6
(France) MC Calleja	2	2
(France) P Paradis	6	6
Q	(United States) M Brown	4	0
(Czechoslovakia) R Maršíková	6	6
(United States) A Smith	3	1
13	(United States) L McNeil	6	6

Second round
6	(Czechoslovakia) H Suková	6	6
(United States) G Magers	4	3
(Argentina) M Paz	6	6
(South Africa) R Fairbank	4	4
(Australia) N Provis	6	3	1
(France) P Paradis	4	6	6
(Czechoslovakia) R Maršíková	6	2	3
13	(United States) L McNeil	4	6	6

Third round
6	(Czechoslovakia) H Suková	6	6
(Argentina) M Paz	3	1
(France) P Paradis	2	3
13	(United States) L McNeil	6	6

Fourth round
6	(Czechoslovakia) H Suková	7	7
13	(United States) L McNeil	5	5

==== Section 6 ====
First round
12	(West Germany) B Bunge	6	6
(Argentina) A Villagrán	1	1
(United States) T Holladay	2	0
(Argentina) B Fulco	6	6
(United States) K Sands	3	1
(United States) M Gurney	6	6
(United States) H Na	6	6
(West Germany) I Cueto	3	1
(Czechoslovakia) I Budařová	2	2
(United States) Ca MacGregor	6	6
(Soviet Union) S Parkhomenko	6	6
(West Germany) C Porwik	3	2
(Italy) F Bonsignori	6	6
(Switzerland) C Jolissaint	4	2
(Canada) H Kelesi	1	5
4	(Czechoslovakia) H Mandlíková	6	7

Second round
12	(West Germany) B Bunge	6	6
(Argentina) B Fulco	0	1
(United States) M Gurney	1	6
(United States) H Na	6	7
(United States) Ca MacGregor	4	2
(Soviet Union) S Parkhomenko	6	6
(Italy) F Bonsignori	0	1
4	(Czechoslovakia) H Mandlíková	6	6

Third round
12	(West Germany) B Bunge	7	7
(United States) H Na	5	5
(Soviet Union) S Parkhomenko	5	4
4	(Czechoslovakia) H Mandlíková	7	6

Fourth round
12	(West Germany) B Bunge	2	4
4	(Czechoslovakia) H Mandlíková	6	6

==== Section 7 ====
First round
7	(United States) Z Garrison	6	6
(United States) K Kinney	4	1
(West Germany) A Betzner	3	4
(Soviet Union) L Savchenko	6	6
(United States) B Potter	4	6	7
(Belgium) A Devries	6	4	6
(United States) A Berger	6	3	6
(United States) G Kim	3	6	4
(South Africa) D Van Rensburg	1	6	6
Q	(United States) L Allen	6	3	0
(United Kingdom) A Croft	2	4
(Bulgaria) K Maleeva	6	6
(United States) K Horvath	3	3
(Australia) E Smylie	6	6
Q	(Czechoslovakia) J Novotná	6	5	2
9	(West Germany) C Kohde-Kilsch	4	7	6

Second round
7	(United States) Z Garrison	6	6
(Soviet Union) L Savchenko	3	2
(United States) B Potter	6	6
(United States) A Berger	3	4
(South Africa) D Van Rensburg	2	3
(Bulgaria) K Maleeva	6	6
(Australia) E Smylie	2	4
9	(West Germany) C Kohde-Kilsch	6	6

Third round
7	(United States) Z Garrison	3	6	6
(United States) B Potter	6	1	4
(Bulgaria) K Maleeva	6	3
9	(West Germany) C Kohde-Kilsch	7	6

Fourth round
7	(United States) Z Garrison	4	6	1
9	(West Germany) C Kohde-Kilsch	6	4	6

==== Section 8 ====
First round
15	(Australia) W Turnbull	4	4
(South Africa) Y Vermaak	6	6
(Italy) R Reggi	2	4
(United States) S Rehe	6	6
(United States) C Benjamin	6	6
(United States) AM Fernandez	4	4
(Japan) E Inoue	4	6	4
(United States) E Hakami	6	2	6
(West Germany) E Pfaff	1	2
(Australia) E Minter	6	6
(Greece) A Kanellopoulou	1	0
(United States) V Nelson-Dunbar	6	6
(Switzerland) E Krapl	1	6	6
(Japan) A Kijimuta	6	2	7
(South Africa) J Mundel	0	1
2	(United States) C Evert	6	6

Second round
(South Africa) Y Vermaak	0	2
(United States) S Rehe	6	6
(United States) C Benjamin	6	6
(United States) E Hakami	2	1
(Australia) E Minter	3	3
(United States) V Nelson-Dunbar	6	6
(Japan) A Kijimuta	1	1
2	(United States) C Evert	6	6

Third round
(United States) S Rehe	6	6
(United States) C Benjamin	4	4
(United States) V Nelson-Dunbar	0	0
2	(United States) C Evert	6	6

Fourth round
(United States) S Rehe	3	2
2	(United States) C Evert	6	6
