= 1987 Lipton International Players Championships – Women's doubles =

Women's doubles
- 1987 Lipton International Players Championships

Final
- Champions: (United States) Martina Navratilova (United States) Pam Shriver
- Runners-up: (West Germany) Claudia Kohde-Kilsch (Czechoslovakia) Helena Suková
- Score: 6–3, 7–6^{(8–6)}

Details
- Draw: 64
- Seeds: 16

Events
Singles	men	women
Doubles	men	women	mixed
← 1986 ·	Miami Open	· 1988 →

Pam Shriver and Helena Suková were the defending champions. Both players competed this year with different partners, facing each other in the final.

Shriver, teaming up with Martina Navratilova, defended her title by defeating Suková and her partner Claudia Kohde-Kilsch 6–3, 7–6^{(8–6)} in the final.

== Seeds ==
1. (United States) Martina Navratilova / (United States) Pam Shriver (champions)
2. (West Germany) Claudia Kohde-Kilsch / (Czechoslovakia) Helena Suková (final)
3. (West Germany) Steffi Graf / (Argentina) Gabriela Sabatini (semifinals)
4. (Czechoslovakia) Hana Mandlíková / (Australia) Wendy Turnbull (quarterfinals)
5. (United States) Elise Burgin / (South Africa) Rosalyn Fairbank (semifinals)
6. (United States) Zina Garrison / (United States) Lori McNeil (quarterfinals)
7. (United States) Gigi Fernández / (United States) Anne Smith (quarterfinals)
8. (Soviet Union) Svetlana Parkhomenko / (Soviet Union) Larisa Savchenko (third round)
9. (United States) Kathy Rinaldi / (United States) Robin White (third round)
10. (United States) Barbara Potter / (Australia) Elizabeth Smylie (third round)
11. (West Germany) Bettina Bunge / (Peru) Laura Gildemeister (second round)
12. (United States) Mary Lou Piatek / (United States) Anne White (first round)
13. (United Kingdom) Jo Durie / (United States) Alycia Moulton (first round)
14. (United States) Candy Reynolds / (France) Catherine Suire (third round)
15. (Sweden) Catarina Lindqvist / (Denmark) Tine Scheuer-Larsen (second round)
16. (Argentina) Mercedes Paz / (West Germany) Eva Pfaff (quarterfinals)

== Draw ==
=== Key ===
- Q = Qualifier
- WC = Wild card
- LL = Lucky loser
- Alt = Alternate
- SE = Special exempt
- PR = Protected ranking
- ITF = ITF entry
- JE = Junior exempt
- w/o = Walkover
- r = Retired
- d = Defaulted
- SR = Special ranking

=== Finals ===
Quarterfinals
1	(United States) Martina Navratilova (United States) Pam Shriver	6	6
7	(United States) Gigi Fernández (United States) Anne Smith	4	3
3	(West Germany) Steffi Graf (Argentina) Gabriela Sabatini	3	6	6
6	(United States) Zina Garrison (United States) Lori McNeil	6	2	2
5	(United States) Elise Burgin (South Africa) Rosalyn Fairbank	7	7
4	(Czechoslovakia) Hana Mandlíková (Australia) Wendy Turnbull	6	6
16	(Argentina) Mercedes Paz (West Germany) Eva Pfaff	1	2
2	(West Germany) Claudia Kohde-Kilsch (Czechoslovakia) Helena Suková	6	6

Semifinals
1	(United States) Martina Navratilova (United States) Pam Shriver	6	6
3	(West Germany) Steffi Graf (Argentina) Gabriela Sabatini	4	0
5	(United States) Elise Burgin (South Africa) Rosalyn Fairbank	6	5	3
2	(West Germany) Claudia Kohde-Kilsch (Czechoslovakia) Helena Suková	4	7	6

Final
1	(United States) Martina Navratilova (United States) Pam Shriver	6	7^{8}
2	(West Germany) Claudia Kohde-Kilsch (Czechoslovakia) Helena Suková	3	6^{6}

=== Top half ===
==== Section 1 ====
First round
1	(United States) M Navratilova (United States) P Shriver	6	6
(United States) R Casals (United States) P Smith	1	1
(Brazil) N DIas (Brazil) P Medrado	3	6	6
(United Kingdom) A Croft (United Kingdom) S Gomer	6	1	1
(United States) A Henricksson (South Africa) J Mundel	6	5
(United States) C Benjamin (South Africa) D Van Rensburg	7	7
(United States) P Barg (Argentina) A Villagrán	2	5
14	(United States) C Reynolds (France) C Suire	6	7
11	(West Germany) B Bunge (Peru) L Gildemeister	7	6
(United States) S Collins (Switzerland) C Jolissaint	6	4
(Czechoslovakia) A Holíková (West Germany) W Probst	2	1
(United States) S Rehe (United States) S Walsh-Pete	6	6
(United States) J Golder (United States) S Rimes	0	2
(United States) H Na (Japan) E Inoue	6	6
(Australia) J Byrne (France) P Paradis	6	0	5
7	(United States) G Fernández (United States) A Smith	3	6	7

Second round
1	(United States) M Navratilova (United States) P Shriver	6	6
(Brazil) N DIas (Brazil) P Medrado	2	2
(United States) C Benjamin (South Africa) D Van Rensburg	3	1
14	(United States) C Reynolds (France) C Suire	6	6
11	(West Germany) B Bunge (Peru) L Gildemeister	3	4
(United States) S Rehe (United States) S Walsh-Pete	6	6
(United States) H Na (Japan) E Inoue	5	3
7	(United States) G Fernández (United States) A Smith	7	6

Third round
1	(United States) M Navratilova (United States) P Shriver	6	6
14	(United States) C Reynolds (France) C Suire	1	0
(United States) S Rehe (United States) S Walsh-Pete	3	1
7	(United States) G Fernández (United States) A Smith	6	6

Quarterfinals
1	(United States) M Navratilova (United States) P Shriver	6	6
7	(United States) G Fernández (United States) A Smith	4	3

==== Section 2 ====
First round
3	(West Germany) S Graf (Argentina) G Sabatini	2	6	6
(United States) L Allen (United States) T Holladay	6	2	3
(United States) J Goodling (United States) J Kaplan	1	2
(South Africa) I Kloss (South Africa) Y Vermaak	6	6
(West Germany) S Meier (West Germany) C Porwik	2	2
(United States) A Holton (United States) J Russell	6	6
(Austria) P Huber (Romania) V Ruzici	1	3
15	(Sweden) C Lindqvist (Denmark) T Scheuer-Larsen	6	6
10	(United States) B Potter (Australia) E Smylie	6	6
(Australia) S Leo (Australia) E Minter	1	3
(Netherlands) C Bakkum (Netherlands) M van der Torre	6	6
(Netherlands) M Bollegraf (Netherlands) N Jagerman	2	4
(United States) K Horvath (United States) W White	3	4
(Argentina) B Fulco (Argentina) P Tarabini	6	6
(United States) Ca MacGregor (United States) Cy MacGregor	4	1
6	(United States) Z Garrison (United States) L McNeil	6	6

Second round
3	(West Germany) S Graf (Argentina) G Sabatini	6	6
(South Africa) I Kloss (South Africa) Y Vermaak	2	4
(United States) A Holton (United States) J Russell	6	7
15	(Sweden) C Lindqvist (Denmark) T Scheuer-Larsen	1	5
10	(United States) B Potter (Australia) E Smylie	6	6
(Netherlands) C Bakkum (Netherlands) M van der Torre	3	1
(Argentina) B Fulco (Argentina) P Tarabini	2	1
6	(United States) Z Garrison (United States) L McNeil	6	6

Third round
3	(West Germany) S Graf (Argentina) G Sabatini	6	6
(United States) A Holton (United States) J Russell	1	2
10	(United States) B Potter (Australia) E Smylie	6	3	2
6	(United States) Z Garrison (United States) L McNeil	3	6	6

Quarterfinals
3	(West Germany) S Graf (Argentina) G Sabatini	3	6	6
6	(United States) Z Garrison (United States) L McNeil	6	2	2

=== Bottom half ===
==== Section 3 ====
First round
5	(United States) E Burgin (South Africa) R Fairbank	6	6
(Netherlands) N Schutte (Netherlands) H ter Riet	4	0
(France) A Dechaume (France) E Derly	2	6	7
(United States) L Antonoplis (Brazil) C Monteiro	6	3	5
(Soviet Union) L Meskhi (Soviet Union) N Zvereva	6	6
(Australia) A Minter (United States) M Van Nostrand	2	3
(Hong Kong) P Hy (Japan) M Yanagi	6	6
12	(United States) ML Piatek (United States) A White	4	2
9	(United States) K Rinaldi (United States) R White	6	4	6
(West Germany) A Betzner (Canada) H Kelesi	1	6	3
(Canada) C Bassett (United States) G Magers	2	6	6
(United States) MJ Fernández (Argentina) E Raponi Longo	6	1	2
(France) Nathalie Phan-Thanh (Australia) N Provis	0	0
(Czechoslovakia) I Budařová (Czechoslovakia) J Novotná	6	6
(United States) AM Fernandez (New Zealand) J Richardson	4	6	0
4	(Czechoslovakia) H Mandlíková (Australia) W Turnbull	6	4	6

Second round
5	(United States) E Burgin (South Africa) R Fairbank	6	6
(United States) L Antonoplis (Brazil) C Monteiro	1	3
(Soviet Union) L Meskhi (Soviet Union) N Zvereva	6	6
(Hong Kong) P Hy (Japan) M Yanagi	2	1
9	(United States) K Rinaldi (United States) R White	6	2	6
(Canada) C Bassett (United States) G Magers	4	6	4
(Czechoslovakia) I Budařová (Czechoslovakia) J Novotná	4	2
4	(Czechoslovakia) H Mandlíková (Australia) W Turnbull	6	6

Third round
5	(United States) E Burgin (South Africa) R Fairbank	w/o
(Soviet Union) L Meskhi (Soviet Union) N Zvereva
9	(United States) K Rinaldi (United States) R White	4	6	4
4	(Czechoslovakia) H Mandlíková (Australia) W Turnbull	6	1	6

Quarterfinals
5	(United States) E Burgin (South Africa) R Fairbank	7	7
4	(Czechoslovakia) H Mandlíková (Australia) W Turnbull	6	6

==== Section 4 ====
First round
8	(Soviet Union) S Parkhomenko (Soviet Union) L Savchenko	6	6
(United States) H Crowe (United States) K Steinmetz	2	1
(Italy) S Cecchini (Socialist Federal Republic of Yugoslavia) S Goleš	6	3	3
(South Africa) E Reinach (South Africa) M Reinach	4	6	6
(United States) B Gerken (United States) B Herr	6	6
(United States) P Louie Harper (Czechoslovakia) R Maršíková	1	2
(United States) T Phelps (Italy) R Reggi	4	5
16	(Argentina) M Paz (West Germany) E Pfaff	6	7
13	(United Kingdom) J Durie (United States) A Moulton	4	6	6
(France) I Demongeot (France) N Tauziat	6	3	3
(South Africa) K Schimper (United States) N Sodupe	7	6
(Switzerland) L Drescher (France) N Herreman	6	3
(Sweden) C Karlsson (Sweden) M Lindström	5	7	0
(West Germany) I Cueto (Spain) A Sánchez Vicario	7	5	6
(Bulgaria) K Maleeva (Bulgaria) M Maleeva	1	4
2	(West Germany) C Kohde-Kilsch (Czechoslovakia) H Suková	6	6

Second round
8	(Soviet Union) S Parkhomenko (Soviet Union) L Savchenko	6	6
(South Africa) E Reinach (South Africa) M Reinach	4	3
(United States) B Gerken (United States) B Herr	3	6	2
16	(Argentina) M Paz (West Germany) E Pfaff	6	3	6
(France) I Demongeot (France) N Tauziat	6	6
(South Africa) K Schimper (United States) N Sodupe	2	2
(West Germany) I Cueto (Spain) A Sánchez Vicario	1	0
2	(West Germany) C Kohde-Kilsch (Czechoslovakia) H Suková	6	6

Third round
8	(Soviet Union) S Parkhomenko (Soviet Union) L Savchenko	2	6	2
16	(Argentina) M Paz (West Germany) E Pfaff	6	3	6
(France) I Demongeot (France) N Tauziat	4	2
2	(West Germany) C Kohde-Kilsch (Czechoslovakia) H Suková	6	6

Quarterfinals
16	(Argentina) M Paz (West Germany) E Pfaff	1	2
2	(West Germany) C Kohde-Kilsch (Czechoslovakia) H Suková	6	6
