= 1988 Lipton International Players Championships – Women's doubles =

Women's doubles
- 1988 Lipton International Players Championships
- 1987 Champions: (United States) Martina Navratilova (United States) Pam Shriver

Final
- Champions: (West Germany) Steffi Graf (Argentina) Gabriela Sabatini
- Runners-up: (United States) Gigi Fernández (United States) Zina Garrison
- Score: 7–6^{(8–6)}, 6–3

Details
- Draw: 64
- Seeds: 16

Events
Singles	men	women
Doubles	men	women
← 1987 ·	Miami Open	· 1989 →

Martina Navratilova and Pam Shriver were the defending champions but did not compete that year.

Steffi Graf and Gabriela Sabatini won in the final 7–6^{(8–6)}, 6–3 against Gigi Fernández and Zina Garrison.

== Seeds ==
Champion seeds are indicated in bold text while text in italics indicates the round in which those seeds were eliminated.

1. (West Germany) Claudia Kohde-Kilsch / (Czechoslovakia) Helena Suková (quarterfinals)
2. (West Germany) **Steffi Graf** / (Argentina) **Gabriela Sabatini (champions)**
3. (United States) Lori McNeil / (United States) Betsy Nagelsen (semifinals)
4. (United States) Gigi Fernández / (United States) Zina Garrison (final)
5. (Australia) Hana Mandlíková / (Czechoslovakia) Jana Novotná (first round)
6. (United States) Chris Evert / (Australia) Wendy Turnbull (quarterfinals)
7. (United States) Mary Lou Daniels / (United States) Robin White (first round)
8. (West Germany) Eva Pfaff / (United States) Barbara Potter (first round)
9. (Sweden) Catarina Lindqvist / (Denmark) Tine Scheuer-Larsen (third round)
10. (France) Catherine Suire / (France) Catherine Tanvier (quarterfinals)
11. (United Kingdom) Jo Durie / (United States) Sharon Walsh-Pete (third round)
12. (United States) Peanut Harper / (United States) Heather Ludloff (second round)
13. (United States) Ann Henricksson / (Switzerland) Christiane Jolissaint (first round)
14. (France) Isabelle Demongeot / (France) Nathalie Tauziat (third round)
15. (United States) Patty Fendick / (Canada) Jill Hetherington (third round)
16. (South Africa) Rosalyn Fairbank / (United States) Stephanie Rehe (third round)

== Draw ==
=== Key ===
- Q = Qualifier
- WC = Wild card
- LL = Lucky loser
- Alt = Alternate
- SE = Special exempt
- PR = Protected ranking
- ITF = ITF entry
- JE = Junior exempt
- w/o = Walkover
- r = Retired
- d = Defaulted
- SR = Special ranking

=== Finals ===
Semifinals

Final

- (United States) Candy Reynolds
- (United States) Paula Smith
1
6
3

4
- (United States) Gigi Fernández
- (United States) Zina Garrison
6
3
6

4
- (United States) Gigi Fernández
- (United States) Zina Garrison
6^{6}
3

2
- (West Germany) Steffi Graf
- (Argentina) Gabriela Sabatini
7^{8}
6

3
- (United States) Lori McNeil
- (United States) Betsy Nagelsen
1
6

2
- (West Germany) Steffi Graf
- (Argentina) Gabriela Sabatini
6
7

=== Top half ===
==== Section 1 ====
First round

Second round

Third round

Quarterfinals

1
(West Germany) C Kohde-Kilsch
(Czechoslovakia) H Suková
6
6
6

(United States) R Casals
(United States) J Russell
7
3
2

1
(West Germany) C Kohde-Kilsch
(Czechoslovakia) H Suková
6
6
6

(United States) T Phelps
(Italy) R Reggi
6
6

- (United States) T Phelps
- (Italy) R Reggi
7
3
2

(Czechoslovakia) I Budařová
(United Kingdom) J Salmon
4
0

1
- (West Germany) C Kohde-Kilsch
- (Czechoslovakia) H Suková
7
6

(New Zealand) B Cordwell
(United States) J Kaplan
2
6
4

9
- (Sweden) C Lindqvist
- (Denmark) T Scheuer-Larsen
6
4

(United States) M J Fernández
(Canada) H Kelesi
6
3
6

(United States) M J Fernández
(Canada) H Kelesi
3
6
3

(United States) J Fuchs
(United States) J Smoller
3
6

9
- (Sweden) C Lindqvist
- (Denmark) T Scheuer-Larsen
6
3
6

9
(Sweden) C Lindqvist
(Denmark) T Scheuer-Larsen
6
7

1
- (West Germany) C Kohde-Kilsch
- (Czechoslovakia) H Suková
6
6
2

12
(United States) P Harper
(United States) H Ludloff
6
6
6

- (United States) C Reynolds
- (United States) P Smith
1
7
6

(United States) A Frazier
(United States) L Spadea
7
1
3

12
- (United States) P Harper
- (United States) H Ludloff
4
6
2

(Japan) A Kijimuta
(Hong Kong) P Moreno
3
7
5

- (United States) C Reynolds
- (United States) P Smith
6
4
6

(United States) C Reynolds
(United States) P Smith
6
5
7

- (United States) C Reynolds
- (United States) P Smith
3
6
6

(Italy) L Garrone
(Italy) L Golarsa
6
6
6

- (United States) K Adams
- (United States) P Barg
6
4
3

(Brazil) P Medrado
(South Africa) K Schimper
4
7
2

- (Italy) L Garrone
- (Italy) L Golarsa
1
1

(United States) K Adams
(United States) P Barg
6
6

- (United States) K Adams
- (United States) P Barg
6
6

5
(Australia) H Mandlíková
(Czechoslovakia) J Novotná
3
3

==== Section 2 ====
First round

Second round

Third round

Quarterfinals

4
(United States) G Fernández
(United States) Z Garrison
2
6
6

(Argentina) G Bosca
(Argentina) A Villagrán
6
2
1

4
(United States) G Fernández
(United States) Z Garrison
6
6

(Switzerland) C Cohen
(Peru) P Vásquez
0
6

- (United States) L Bartlett
- (United States) C Christian
4
0

(United States) L Bartlett
(United States) C Christian
6
7

4
- (United States) G Fernández
- (United States) Z Garrison
6
6

(Hong Kong) P Hy
(South Africa) D Van Rensburg
6
6

15
- (United States) P Fendick
- (Canada) J Hetherington
3
3

(West Germany) I Cueto
(Spain) A Sánchez
4
1

(Hong Kong) P Hy
(South Africa) D Van Rensburg
0
1

(United States) G Magers
(United States) W White
2
4

15
- (United States) P Fendick
- (Canada) J Hetherington
6
6

15
(United States) P Fendick
(Canada) J Hetherington
6
6

4
- (United States) G Fernández
- (United States) Z Garrison
6
7

13
(United States) A Henricksson
(Switzerland) C Jolissaint
2
4

- (South Africa) L Gregory
- (United States) R Reis
3
6

(Sweden) M Lindström
; (West Germany) C Porwik
6
6

- (Sweden) M Lindström
- (West Germany) C Porwik
2
3

(United States) B Bowes
(United States) M Werdel
2
7
6

- (United States) B Bowes
- (United States) M Werdel
6
6

(Poland) I Kuczyńska
(Australia) A Minter
6
5
0

- (United States) B Bowes
- (United States) M Werdel
6
1
6

(South Africa) L Gregory
; (United States) R Reis
6
7

- (South Africa) L Gregory
- (United States) R Reis
3
6
7

(Italy) S Cecchini
; (Socialist Federal Republic of Yugoslavia) S Goleš
3
6

- (South Africa) L Gregory
- (United States) R Reis
3
6
6

(Brazil) N Dias
(Argentina) P Tarabini
2
6
6

- (Brazil) N Dias
- (Argentina) P Tarabini
6
3
4

7
(United States) M-L Daniels
(United States) R White
6
2
3

=== Bottom half ===
==== Section 3 ====
First round

Second round

Third round

Quarterfinals

8
(West Germany) E Pfaff
(United States) B Potter
5
6

(United States) Ca MacGregor
(United States) Cy MacGregor
7
7

- (United States) Ca MacGregor
- (United States) Cy MacGregor
6
6

(Netherlands) M Bollegraf
(Netherlands) M van der Torre
6
3
6

- (Netherlands) M Bollegraf
- (Netherlands) M van der Torre
4
0

(United States) L Antonoplis
(United States) B Gerken
4
6
3

- (United States) Ca MacGregor
- (United States) Cy MacGregor
2
6

(United States) A M Fernandez
(New Zealand) J Richardson
3
3

10
- (France) C Suire
- (France) C Tanvier
6
7

(United States) E Hakami
(West Germany) C Singer
6
6

- (United States) E Hakami
- (West Germany) C Singer
3
3

(United States) L Allen
(South Africa) E Reinach
2
2

10
- (France) C Suire
- (France) C Tanvier
6
6

10
(France) C Suire
(France) C Tanvier
6
6

10
- (France) C Suire
- (France) C Tanvier
6
6
5

14
(France) I Demongeot
(France) N Tauziat
6
6

3
- (United States) L McNeil
- (United States) B Nagelsen
3
7
7

(Belgium) A Devries
(Switzerland) E Krapl
0
2

14
- (France) I Demongeot
- (France) N Tauziat
7
6

(West Germany) A Betzner
(United States) K Sands
6
6

- (West Germany) A Betzner
- (United States) K Sands
5
3

(Argentina) B Fulco
(Brazil) G Miró
0
1

14
- (France) I Demongeot
- (France) N Tauziat
3
6
4

(United States) E Raponi-Longo
(United States) N Sodupe
4
2

3
- (United States) L McNeil
- (United States) B Nagelsen
6
4
6

(France) N Herreman
(France) P Paradis
6
6

- (France) N Herreman
- (France) P Paradis
6
3

(United States) M Gurney
(United States) S Sloane
1
3

3
- (United States) L McNeil
- (United States) B Nagelsen
7
6

3
(United States) L McNeil
(United States) B Nagelsen
6
6

==== Section 4 ====
First round

Second round

Third round

Quarterfinals

6
(United States) C Evert
(Australia) W Turnbull
6
6

(Australia) L Field
(Netherlands) H Witvoet
3
0

6
- (United States) C Evert
- (Australia) W Turnbull
6
6

(France) E Derly
(United States) V Nelson-Dunbar
1
5

- (United States) C Benjamin
- (Netherlands) B Schultz
4
0

(United States) C Benjamin
(Netherlands) B Schultz
6
7

6
- (United States) C Evert
- (Australia) W Turnbull
6
6

(United States) P Casale
(Netherlands) I Driehuis
6
4

16
- (South Africa) R Fairbank
- (United States) S Rehe
2
1

(West Germany) S Meier
(West Germany) W Probst
7
6

- (West Germany) S Meier
- (West Germany) W Probst
4
2

(United States) D-A Hansel
(United States) W Wood
2
2

16
- (South Africa) R Fairbank
- (United States) S Rehe
6
6

16
(South Africa) R Fairbank
(United States) S Rehe
6
6

6
- (United States) C Evert
- (Australia) W Turnbull
1
4

11
(United Kingdom) J Durie
(United States) S Walsh-Pete
6
6
7

2
- (West Germany) S Graf
- (Argentina) G Sabatini
6
6

(United States) K Foxworth
(United States) T Whittington
4
7
5

11
- (United Kingdom) J Durie
- (United States) S Walsh-Pete
1
6
6

(South Africa) L Barnard
(South Africa) M de Swardt
7
7

- (South Africa) L Barnard
- (South Africa) M de Swardt
6
3
4

(United States) H Crowe
(United States) K Steinmetz
5
6

11
- (United Kingdom) J Durie
- (United States) S Walsh-Pete
2
0

(United States) K Horvath
(Australia) N Provis
6
5
5

2
- (West Germany) S Graf
- (Argentina) G Sabatini
6
6

(Australia) D Balestrat
(Argentina) M Paz
4
7
7

- (Australia) D Balestrat
- (Argentina) M Paz
4
4

(Czechoslovakia) A Holíková
(United States) M Torres
1
2

2
- (West Germany) S Graf
- (Argentina) G Sabatini
6
6

2
(West Germany) S Graf
(Argentina) G Sabatini
6
6
