= 1987 Lipton International Players Championships – Men's doubles =

Men's doubles
- 1987 Lipton International Players Championships

Final
- Champions: (United States) Paul Annacone (South Africa) Christo van Rensburg
- Runners-up: (United States) Ken Flach (United States) Robert Seguso
- Score: 6–2, 6–4, 6–4

Details
- Draw: 64 (4Q)
- Seeds: 16

Events
Singles	men	women
Doubles	men	women	mixed
- Miami Open

Brad Gilbert and Vince Van Patten were the defending champions but only Gilbert competed that year with Kevin Curren.

Curren and Gilbert lost in the quarterfinals to Andrés Gómez and Slobodan Živojinović. Paul Annacone and Christo van Rensburg won in the final 6–2, 6–4, 6–4 against Ken Flach and Robert Seguso.

== Seeds ==
1. (Sweden) Stefan Edberg / (Sweden) Anders Järryd (quarterfinals)
2. (Ecuador) Andrés Gómez / (Socialist Federal Republic of Yugoslavia) Slobodan Živojinović (semifinals)
3. (France) Guy Forget / (France) Yannick Noah (semifinals, withdrew)
4. (Sweden) Joakim Nyström / (Sweden) Mats Wilander (first round)
5. (Spain) Sergio Casal / (Spain) Emilio Sánchez (third round)
6. (United States) Paul Annacone / (South Africa) Christo van Rensburg (champions)
7. (United States) Gary Donnelly / (United States) Mike Leach (third round)
8. (United States) Ken Flach / (United States) Robert Seguso (final)
9. (United States) Kevin Curren / (United States) Brad Gilbert (quarterfinals)
10. (South Africa) Christo Steyn / (South Africa) Danie Visser (third round)
11. (United States) Sherwood Stewart / (United States) Kim Warwick (third round)
12. (Australia) Peter Doohan / (Australia) Laurie Warder (quarterfinals)
13. (Czechoslovakia) Miloslav Mečíř / (Czechoslovakia) Tomáš Šmíd (second round)
14. (United States) Mike De Palmer / (Switzerland) Jakob Hlasek (second round)
15. (United States) John McEnroe / (United States) Matt Mitchell (first round)
16. (South Africa) Gary Muller / (United States) Robert Van't Hof (second round)

== Draw ==
Key

- Q = Qualifier
- WC = Wild card
- LL = Lucky loser
- Alt = Alternate
- ITF = ITF entry
- PR = Protected ranking
- SR = Special ranking
- SE = Special exempt
- JE = Junior exempt
- JR = Junior Accelerator Programme entrant
- CO = College Accelerator Programme entrant
- NG = Next Gen Accelerator Program entrant
- w/o = Walkover
- r = Retired
- d = Defaulted

=== Finals ===
Semifinals
8	(United States) Ken Flach (United States) Robert Seguso	w/o
3	(France) Guy Forget (France) Yannick Noah
6	(United States) Paul Annacone (South Africa) Christo van Rensburg	6	6	6
2	(Ecuador) Andrés Gómez (Socialist Federal Republic of Yugoslavia) Slobodan Živojinović	3	4	2

Final
8	(United States) Ken Flach (United States) Robert Seguso	2	4	4
6	(United States) Paul Annacone (South Africa) Christo van Rensburg	6	6	6

=== Top half ===
==== Section 1 ====
First round
1	(Sweden) S Edberg (Sweden) A Järryd	6	7
(Australia) D Graham (Finland) O Rahnasto	1	6
(Mexico) J Lozano (United States) T Witsken	7	1	6
(Chile) R Acuña (United States) M Davis	5	6	4
(United States) M Robertson (United States) T Warneke	6	6
(Haiti) R Agénor (France) T Benhabiles	2	3
(United States) M Freeman (United States) B Schultz	5	3
16	(South Africa) G Muller (United States) R Van't Hof	7	6
10	(South Africa) C Steyn (South Africa) D Visser	6	4	7
(Brazil) N Aerts (Brazil) I Kley	2	6	5
(Australia) D Cahill (United States) J Pugh	4	4
(Israel) G Bloom (United States) J Levine	6	6
(United States) R Baxter (United States) L Scott	6	3
Q	(Colombia) Á Jordan (Mexico) F Maciel	7	6
(Denmark) M Mortensen (United States) T Nelson	5	5
8	(United States) K Flach (United States) R Seguso	7	7

Second round
1	(Sweden) S Edberg (Sweden) A Järryd	7	2	7
(Mexico) J Lozano (United States) T Witsken	6	6	5
(United States) M Robertson (United States) T Warneke	7	6
16	(South Africa) G Muller (United States) R Van't Hof	6	3
10	(South Africa) C Steyn (South Africa) D Visser	6	6
(Israel) G Bloom (United States) J Levine	3	4
Q	(Colombia) Á Jordan (Mexico) F Maciel	4	4
8	(United States) K Flach (United States) R Seguso	6	6

Third round
1	(Sweden) S Edberg (Sweden) A Järryd	7	6	6
(United States) M Robertson (United States) T Warneke	6	7	3
10	(South Africa) C Steyn (South Africa) D Visser	3	6
8	(United States) K Flach (United States) R Seguso	6	7

Quarterfinals
1	(Sweden) S Edberg (Sweden) A Järryd	6	4	3
8	(United States) K Flach (United States) R Seguso	1	6	6

==== Section 2 ====
First round
3	(France) G Forget (France) Y Noah	6	6
(Australia) B Dyke (Australia) W Masur	3	4
(United States) S Davis (United States) D Pate	6	5
(United States) H Pfister (Sweden) J Svensson	7	7
Q	(United States) A Agassi (United States) M Bauer	2	6	6
Q	(United States) T Delatte (Sweden) M Tideman	6	3	3
(United States) J Letts (United States) R Matuszewski	1	5
13	(Czechoslovakia) M Mečíř (Czechoslovakia) T Šmíd	6	7
12	(Australia) P Doohan (Australia) L Warder	6	6	7
(Sweden) J Gunnarsson (Sweden) P Lundgren	3	7	6
(United Kingdom) J Bates (United Kingdom) A Castle	4	5
(United States) K Jones (United States) B Pearce	6	7
(Italy) P Canè (Italy) S Colombo	6	3	7
(United States) C B Cox (Australia) M Fancutt	4	6	6
(United States) R Brown (United States) B Willenborg	6	1
5	(Spain) S Casal (Spain) E Sánchez	7	6

Second round
3	(France) G Forget (France) Y Noah	6	6
(United States) H Pfister (Sweden) J Svensson	4	2
Q	(United States) A Agassi (United States) M Bauer	7	4	6
13	(Czechoslovakia) M Mečíř (Czechoslovakia) T Šmíd	5	6	3
12	(Australia) P Doohan (Australia) L Warder	7	6
(United States) K Jones (United States) B Pearce	6	3
(Italy) P Canè (Italy) S Colombo	6	4
5	(Spain) S Casal (Spain) E Sánchez	7	6

Third round
3	(France) G Forget (France) Y Noah	6	1	6
Q	(United States) A Agassi (United States) M Bauer	4	6	1
12	(Australia) P Doohan (Australia) L Warder	6	6
5	(Spain) S Casal (Spain) E Sánchez	4	4

Quarterfinals
3	(France) G Forget (France) Y Noah	6	6
12	(Australia) P Doohan (Australia) L Warder	4	3

=== Bottom half ===
==== Section 3 ====
First round
6	(United States) P Annacone (South Africa) C van Rensburg	6	6
(Belgium) L Pimek (Czechoslovakia) P Složil	2	4
(South Africa) E Edwards (Paraguay) F González	6	6
(New Zealand) K Evernden (United States) B Green	3	4
(United States) D Cassidy (United States) M Purcell	4	5
(United States) S Giammalva, Jr. (United States) G Holmes	6	7
(Sweden) P Carlsson (Sweden) J Windahl	4	3
11	(United States) S Stewart (Australia) K Warwick	6	6
14	(United States) M De Palmer (Switzerland) J Hlasek	6	6
(Switzerland) H Günthardt (United States) J Kriek	4	4
(West Germany) T Meinecke (West Germany) R Osterthun	6	3	4
(United States) G Layendecker (Canada) G Michibata	4	6	6
(United States) M Flur (New Zealand) R Simpson	7	6
(Brazil) C Kirmayr (Italy) C Panatta	6	3
(United States) M Anger (United States) T Pawsat	7	7
4	(Sweden) J Nyström (Sweden) M Wilander	5	5

Second round
6	(United States) P Annacone (South Africa) C van Rensburg	6	5	6
(South Africa) E Edwards (Paraguay) F González	3	7	3
(United States) S Giammalva, Jr. (United States) G Holmes	4	7	3
11	(United States) S Stewart (Australia) K Warwick	6	6	6
14	(United States) M De Palmer (Switzerland) J Hlasek	3	6	4
(United States) G Layendecker (Canada) G Michibata	6	2	6
(United States) M Flur (New Zealand) R Simpson	6	7	4
(United States) M Anger (United States) T Pawsat	7	6	6

Third round
6	(United States) P Annacone (South Africa) C van Rensburg	6	6	7
11	(United States) S Stewart (Australia) K Warwick	3	7	5
(United States) G Layendecker (Canada) G Michibata	7	6	6
(United States) M Anger (United States) T Pawsat	5	7	4

Quarterfinals
6	(United States) P Annacone (South Africa) C van Rensburg	6	7
(United States) G Layendecker (Canada) G Michibata	4	6

==== Section 4 ====
First round
7	(United States) G Donnelly (United States) M Leach	6	6	6
(Australia) A Emerson (Australia) D Tyson	3	7	4
(United States) J Rive (United States) D Tarr	6	4	6
(United States) B Testerman (United States) T Wilkison	2	6	3
Q	(United States) K Richter (United States) R Rudeen	4	6	6
(United States) Tim Gullikson (United States) Tom Gullikson	6	2	7
(Iran) M Bahrami (Uruguay) D Pérez	7	3	1
9	(United States) K Curren (United States) B Gilbert	6	6	6
15	(United States) J McEnroe (United States) M Mitchell	4	7	4
(Czechoslovakia) I Lendl (United States) B Scanlon	6	6	6
(Netherlands) M Schapers (Czechoslovakia) M Šrejber	4	7	6
(South Africa) B Levine (South Africa) B Moir	6	6	4
(United States) J Arias (Israel) A Mansdorf	6	6	3
(Nigeria) T Mmoh (Nigeria) N Odizor	7	3	6
(United States) S Denton (United States) D Dowlen	3	6	3
2	(Ecuador) A Gómez (Socialist Federal Republic of Yugoslavia) S Živojinović	6	3	6

Second round
7	(United States) G Donnelly (United States) M Leach	6	6
(United States) J Rive (United States) D Tarr	4	3
(United States) Tim Gullikson (United States) Tom Gullikson	4	6
9	(United States) K Curren (United States) B Gilbert	6	7
(Czechoslovakia) I Lendl (United States) B Scanlon	7	6	7
(Netherlands) M Schapers (Czechoslovakia) M Šrejber	6	7	6
(Nigeria) T Mmoh (Nigeria) N Odizor	4	5
2	(Ecuador) A Gómez (Socialist Federal Republic of Yugoslavia) S Živojinović	6	7

Third round
7	(United States) G Donnelly (United States) M Leach	6	4	4
9	(United States) K Curren (United States) B Gilbert	4	6	6
(Czechoslovakia) I Lendl (United States) B Scanlon	3	5
2	(Ecuador) A Gómez (Socialist Federal Republic of Yugoslavia) S Živojinović	6	7

Quarterfinals
9	(United States) K Curren (United States) B Gilbert	2	6	3
2	(Ecuador) A Gómez (Socialist Federal Republic of Yugoslavia) S Živojinović	6	2	6
